= List of Supergirl characters =

Supergirl is an American television series developed by Greg Berlanti, Ali Adler, and Andrew Kreisberg based on the characters created by Jerry Siegel and Joe Shuster in the Superman franchise and Al Plastino and Otto Binder's character Supergirl. The series stars Melissa Benoist in the titular role of Kara Zor-El / Kara Danvers / Supergirl, as well as Mehcad Brooks, Chyler Leigh, Jeremy Jordan, David Harewood and Calista Flockhart, with Katie McGrath, Chris Wood, Floriana Lima, Odette Annable, Jesse Rath, Sam Witwer, Nicole Maines, April Parker Jones, Azie Tesfai, Andrea Brooks, Julie Gonzalo, Staz Nair, LaMonica Garrett and Peta Sergeant joining in later seasons. In addition to original characters, several other characters from the DC Comics universe also appear throughout the series. For its first season, Supergirl aired on CBS, before moving to The CW for its second season.

The series follows Kryptonian refugee and Superman's biological cousin Kara Zor-El (Benoist), who, after hiding her powers on Earth for more than a decade, becomes National City's superhero as Supergirl, battles against extraterrestrial and otherworldly threats, criminal masterminds, being targeted by her cousin's rogues gallery, and encountering an emerging community of metahumans within her adoptive world and individuals from parallel universes. Supergirl also deals with the Earth populace's fears and hostility against extraterrestrials and other beings with superpowers, leading her into conflicts with industrialist Maxwell Lord (Peter Facinelli), Lucy Lane's (Jenna Dewan) father General Sam Lane (Glenn Morshower) and Project Cadmus. She is assisted by a few close friends and family who guard her secrets—most notably her cousin's longtime friend James Olsen (Brooks), her adopted sister Alex Danvers (Leigh), and the Martian survivor J'onn J'onzz (Harewood).

The following is a list of characters who have appeared in the television series. Many are named after (or based on) DC Comics characters.

== Overview ==
Legend
= Main cast (credited)
= Recurring cast (4+ episodes)
= Guest cast (1–3 episodes)

Supergirl cast and characters
Character	Portrayed by	Seasons					
Character	Portrayed by	1	2	3	4	5	6
Main characters
Kara Zor-El / Kara Danvers / Supergirl	Melissa Benoist	Main	Main	Main	Main	Main	Main
James "Jimmy" Olsen / Guardian	Mehcad Brooks	Main (Note: Brooks is credited through "In Plain Sight".)	Main	Main	Main	Main	Guest
Alexandra "Alex" Danvers	Chyler Leigh	Main	Main	Main	Main	Main	Main
Winslow "Winn" Schott Jr. / Toyman	Jeremy Jordan	Main	Main	Main		Guest	Guest
J'onn J'onzz / Martian Manhunter	David Harewood	Main (Note: In season one, Harewood is initially credited as Hank Henshaw for his portrayal of J'onn J'onzz until "Human for a Day", in which he is revealed to be portraying the latter character in the guise of the former.)	Main	Main	Main	Main	Main
Cat Grant	Calista Flockhart	Main	Recurring	Guest (Note: Flockhart is uncredited for her appearance in "Man of Steel".)	Guest		Guest
Mon-El	Chris Wood		Main	Main		Guest	Guest
Maggie Sawyer	Floriana Lima		Main	Recurring			
Lena Luthor	Katie McGrath		Recurring	Main	Main	Main	Main
Samantha Arias / Reign	Odette Annable			Main		Guest	
Querl Dox / Brainiac 5	Jesse Rath			Recurring	Main	Main	Main
Ben Lockwood / Agent Liberty	Sam Witwer				Main	Guest	
Nia Nal / Dreamer	Nicole Maines				Main	Main	Main
Lauren Haley	April Parker Jones				Main		
Kelly Olsen	Azie Tesfai				Recurring	Main	Main
Eve Teschmacher	Andrea Brooks		Recurring	Recurring	Recurring	Main	Guest
Andrea Rojas / Acrata	Julie Gonzalo					Main	Main
William Dey	Staz Nair					Main	Main
Mar Novu / The Monitor	LaMonica Garrett				Guest	Main (Note: Garrett appears only in "The Wrath of Rama Khan" and "Crisis on Infinite Earths: Part One".)	
Nyxlygsptlnz "Nyxly"	Peta Sergeant						Main (Note: Sergeant is credited as a series regular from (6.03) onwards.)
Recurring characters
Jeremiah Danvers	Dean Cain	Recurring	Recurring				
Eliza Danvers	Helen Slater	Recurring	Guest	Guest	Guest	Guest	Guest
Agent Vasquez	Briana Venskus	Recurring	Guest	Guest			
Astra In-Ze	Laura Benanti	Recurring					
Alura Zor-El	Laura Benanti	Recurring	Guest				
Alura Zor-El	Erica Durance			Recurring		Guest	
Zor-El	Robert Gant	Guest	Guest				
Zor-El	Jason Behr						Recurring
Leslie Willis / Livewire	Brit Morgan	Recurring	Guest	Guest			
Non	Chris Vance	Recurring					
Maxwell Lord	Peter Facinelli	Recurring					
Lucy Lane	Jenna Dewan-Tatum	Recurring					
Sam Lane	Glenn Morshower	Recurring					
Siobhan Smythe / Silver Banshee	Italia Ricci	Recurring					
Indigo	Laura Vandervoort	Recurring					
Kal-El / Clark Kent / Superman	Tyler Hoechlin	Stand-in	Recurring		Guest	Guest	
Lillian Luthor	Brenda Strong		Recurring	Guest	Recurring	Recurring	Guest
M'gann M'orzz / Miss Martian	Sharon Leal		Recurring	Guest		Guest	Recurring
Demos	Curtis Lum		Recurring	Guest			
Olivia Marsdin	Lynda Carter		Recurring		Guest		
Snapper Carr	Ian Gomez		Recurring				
Lyra Strayd	Tamzin Merchant		Recurring				
Rhea	Teri Hatcher		Recurring				
Lar Gand	Kevin Sorbo		Recurring				
M'rynn J'onzz	Carl Lumbly			Recurring	Guest	Guest	
Selena	Anjali Jay			Recurring		Guest	
Ruby Arias	Emma Tremblay			Recurring			
Morgan Edge	Adrian Pasdar			Recurring			
Thomas Coville	Chad Lowe			Recurring		Guest	
Imra Ardeen / Saturn Girl	Amy Jackson			Recurring			
Julia Freeman / Purity	Krys Marshall			Recurring			
Lex Luthor	Jon Cryer				Recurring	Recurring	Recurring
Mercy Graves	Rhona Mitra				Recurring		
Otis Graves	Robert Baker				Recurring	Guest	Guest
Raymond Jensen / Parasite	Anthony Konechny				Recurring		
Mackenzie	Jaymee Mak				Recurring		
Phillip Baker	Bruce Boxleitner				Recurring		
Lydia Lockwood	Sarah Smyth				Recurring		
George Lockwood	Graham Verchere				Recurring		
Manchester Black	David Ajala				Recurring		
Sarah Walker	Francoise Robertson				Recurring		
Margot Morrison	Patti Allan				Guest	Recurring	
Malefic J'onzz	Phil LaMarr				Guest	Recurring	
Gamemnae	Cara Buono					Recurring	Guest
Rama Khan	Mitch Pileggi					Recurring	
Mitch	Matt Baram						Recurring
Esme	Mila Jones						Recurring
Orlando Davis	Jhaleil Swaby						Recurring

== Main characters ==
=== Kara Zor-El / Kara Danvers / Supergirl ===
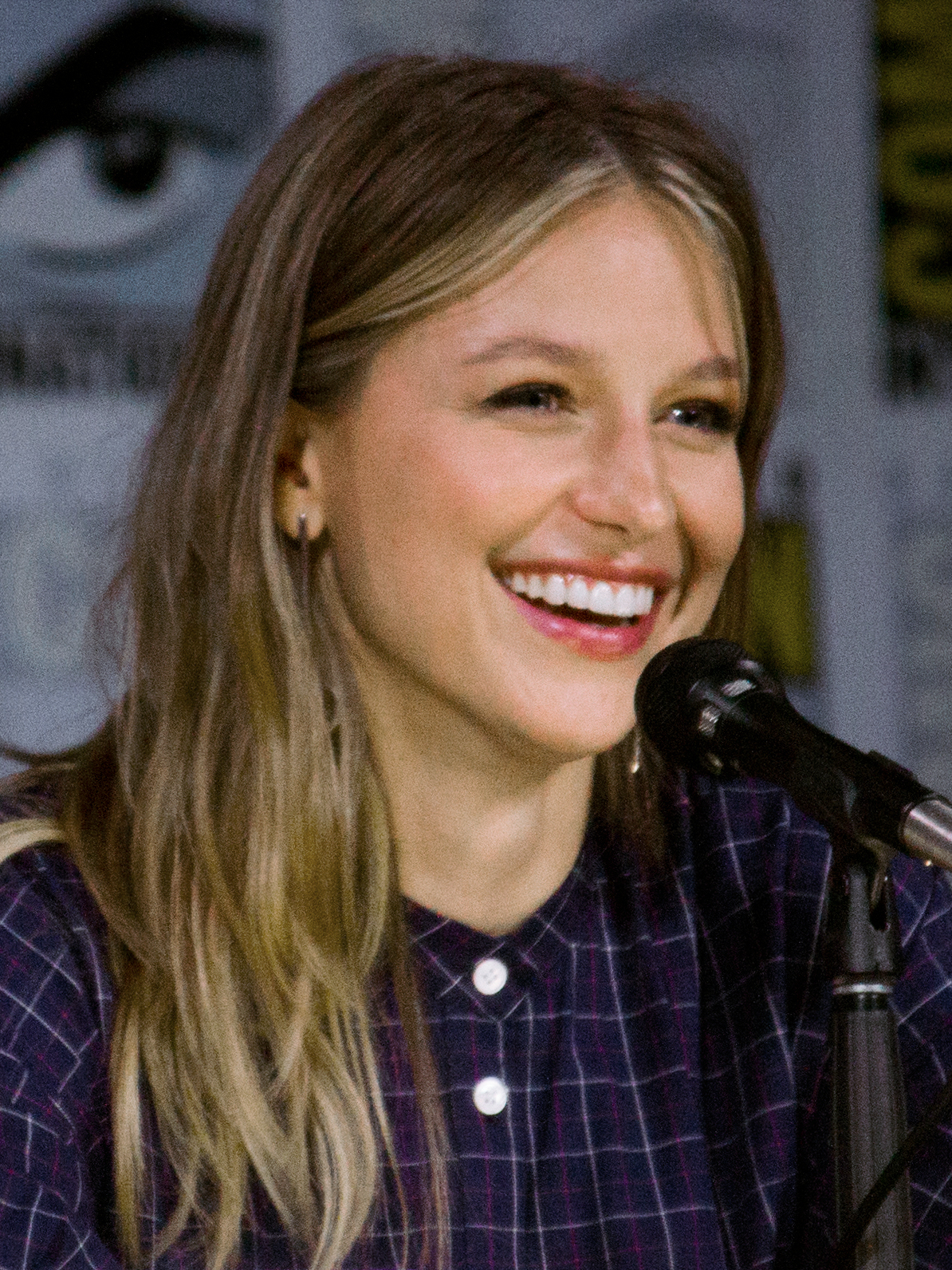
Melissa Benoist

Kara Zor-El / Kara Danvers / Supergirl (Melissa Benoist as an adult, seasons 1–6; Malina Weissman and Izabela Vidovic as a teenager) is a 24-year-old Kryptonian living in National City, who must embrace her powers after previously hiding them. When her pod crashed on Earth at a young age, she was found by her cousin Superman and was taken to live with his friend Jeremiah Danvers. She assists her adoptive sister, Alex Danvers, as part of the Department of Extranormal Operations (DEO). She discovers the truth that Jeremiah Danvers also worked for the DEO, so they would not take Kara. Alex's co-workers at the DEO help Kara to perfect her powers. Kara has a day job, working as Cat Grant's assistant at CatCo. Kara learns of the existence of metahumans and the multiverse when she befriends Barry Allen, aka the Flash, a superhero from a parallel Earth (Earth-1). Benoist expressed her excitement over portraying the character, and being able to "(tell) a story about a human being really realizing their potential and their strength". Claire Holt and Gemma Atkinson were considered for the role.

In season two, Kara deals with feuds between Earth's native populace and the extraterrestrial community, and struggles with romantic feelings for Daxamite prince Mon-El. She learns that Superman was formerly a member of the DEO, making her his successor within the organization. She becomes close with Lex Luthor's paternal half-sister Lena, and is targeted by Luthor's mother, Lilian, leader of Project Cadmus, an organization now dedicated to the exploitation and destruction of all aliens. Kara's adversaries include Mon-El's mother, Rhea, who wants to retrieve her son, the prince of Daxam, and invade Earth. Kara also becomes a visiting superhero to Earth-1 and a recurring ally of its heroes, including Barry's best friend, Oliver Queen, the vigilante archer Green Arrow.

In season three, Kara deals with the threat of Selena and the Worldkillers, including a new character, Samantha "Sam" Arias/Reign, another refugee from Krypton who is at first unaware of her origins and of her evil persona. Eventually Sam and Reign are physically separated, and Sam killed Reign at the cost of her own life and others'. Kara travels back in time to save Sam and prevent the sacrifice of Mon-El and of Kara's mother, Alura, who has survived Krypton. Kara takes the Harun-El (Black Kryptonite) with Sam and Reign into the Fountain of Lilith, taking down Reign. Unbeknownst to her, another Kara appears in the border of Siberia.

In season four, Kara deals with a new wave of anti-alien sentiment from the public, both as Supergirl and as a CatCo reporter. The hostility is secretly orchestrated by Lex Luthor. During the fight at Shelly Island, Supergirl fights against Lex Luthor using a special lead suit. Red Daughter sacrifices her life to give Supergirl the opportunity to defeat Lex Luthor.

In season five, Kara finds that CatCo is bought out by Andrea Rojas and she also contends with Leviathan. During the "Arrowverse", Supergirl, Superman, and Lois Lane work with their Earth-1 allies in their attempt to save the people of Earth-38 and becomes one of the Paragons at the cost of Oliver Queen. When Anti-Monitor destroys most of the Multiverse, Kara and the rest of the Paragons fight Anti-Monitor and the Shadow Demons. Oliver's second sacrifice as Spectre resulted in the creation of Earth-Prime where she finds that Lex Luthor was never a bad guy and LuthorCorp owns the DEO After finding that her Earth merged with Flash's Earth and Black Lightning's unnamed Earth, Supergirl and her allies fight the Anti-Monitor again. Afterwards, Supergirl contends with the plots of Lex Luthor and Leviathan.

In season six, Kara is sent to the Phantom Zone during the fight against Lex Luthor. She reunites with her father Zor-El and meets a 5th Dimension Imp named Nyxlygsptlnz as she works to escape. Kara and Zor-El were later rescued by the Super Friends using a sun bomb. By the end of season six following Lex Luthor and Nyxlygsptlnz being dragged into the Phantom Zone, Kara finds out that Cat knows of her secret identity and is convinced to reveal it upon accepting the position of editor-in-chief at CatCo.

==== Overgirl ====
During the "Crisis on Earth-X" crossover, Benoist also portrays Overgirl, a fascistic parallel-universe counterpart of Supergirl from the Nazi-ruled world, Earth-X. Other performers superimposed in Benoist's likeness include her stunt double Jennifer Clarke. Overgirl is also referred to by Harry Wells and Cisco Ramon as Supergirl-X and Kara-X. The Earth-X Kara Zor-El is married to the Führer of Earth-X, Oliver Queen's doppelgänger, Dark Arrow. After Overgirl's heart is damaged, her husband tries and fails to seize Kara's heart to replace it. Overgirl dies, going supernova and exploding in space.

==== Red Daughter ====
In season four, Kara deals with a new wave of anti-alien sentiment from the public, both as Supergirl and as a CatCo reporter. The hostility is secretly orchestrated by Lex Luthor. Kara's Harun-El-replicated clone, Red Daughter (also portrayed by Benoist), is in the nation Kasnia, where she is being tested and trained by its military forces. It is revealed later that this is part of Luthor's latest scheme to defeat both Supergirl and Superman. Red Daughter has no memories or knowledge of her origins, and she sees Luthor as a mentor. She speaks Russian fluently. Kara's clone is eventually betrayed and presumably killed by Luthor after she has completed her part of his plan. During the fight at Shelly Island, Supergirl fights against Lex Luthor using a special lead suit. Red Daughter sacrifices her life to give Supergirl the opportunity to defeat Lex Luthor.

=== James Olsen / Guardian ===
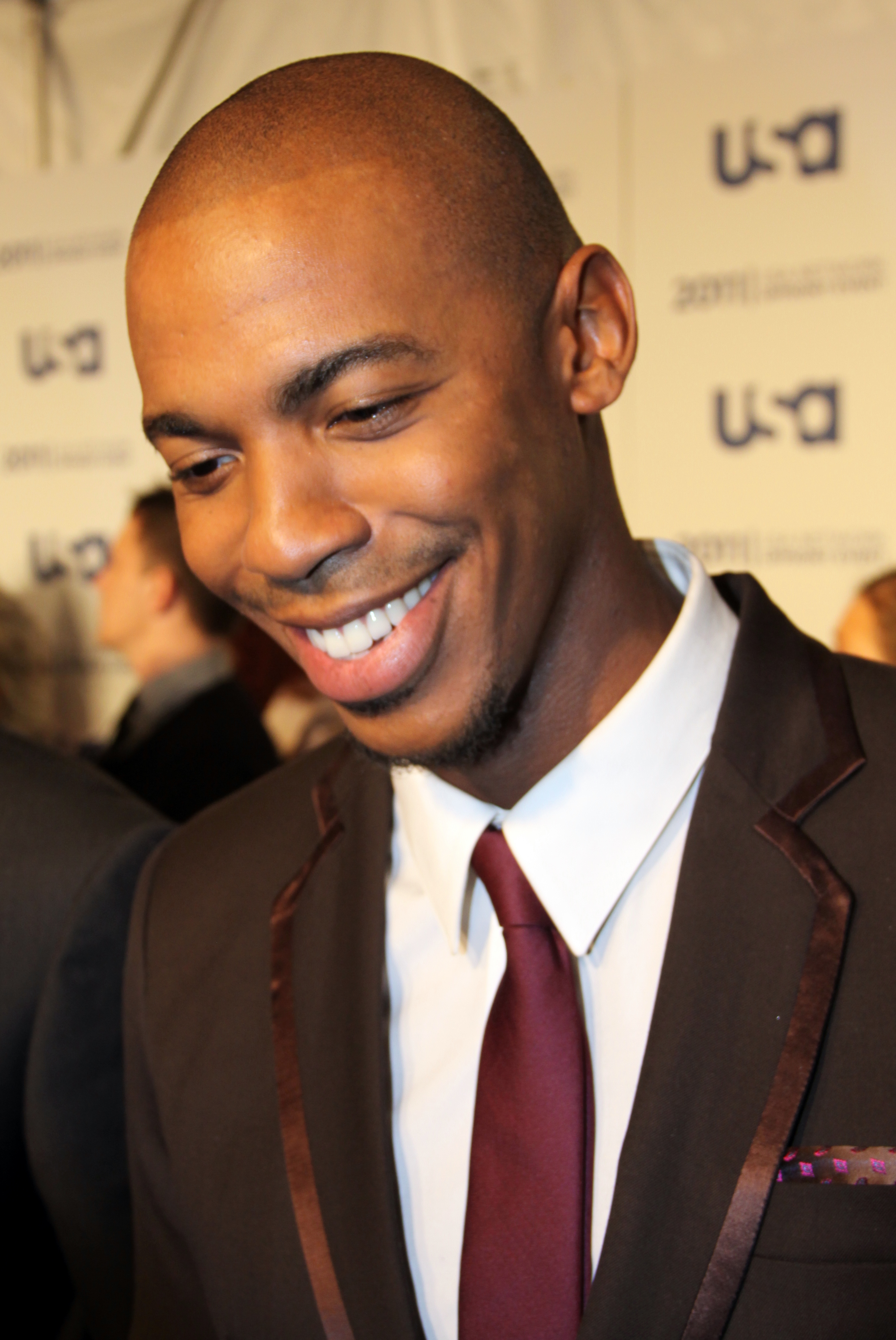
Mehcad Brooks

James Olsen (Mehcad Brooks; main: seasons 1–5; guest: season 6) is a former Daily Planet photographer who moved to National City and became the new art director for his former colleague, Cat Grant's media company, CatCo Worldwide Media. He is a potential love interest for Kara. Among his reasons for moving across the country include his breakup with his girlfriend Lucy Lane (with whom he has since reconciled), and keeping an eye on the newly revealed Supergirl for Superman, who considers him a close friend. While working at the Daily Planet, James received a Pulitzer Prize for taking the first photograph of Superman.

In season two, though initially attracted to each other, James and Kara decided that they are incompatible as a couple but remain friends. With Winn's help, James becomes Guardian. He was also named acting CEO of CatCo after Cat Grant took a sabbatical from the company.

In season three, James and Lena Luthor begin a relationship. By the end of season three, James reveals himself to the public as the Guardian.

In season four, James works to help Supergirl in battling the Children of Liberty. After CatCo prints a story about the alien march, James is shot by an unseen sniper. It was discovered that the sniper was a thought-to-be-dead Otis who survived the Hellgrammite attack. After being injected with a Harun-El serum, while dealing with a traumatic stress, James begins to developing metahuman abilities similar to Kryptonians'. During the fight against Agent Liberty at Shelly Island, James and Agent Liberty remove the Harun-El serum from each other.

In season five, James is replaced by Andrea Rojas as editor-in-chief of CatCo and quits after refusing to support her sensationalist plans. He later leaves National City and returns to his hometown Calvinville to take over its newspaper.

In season six, James returns as Guardian to help the Super Friends fight Lex Luthor and Nyxlygsptlnz. He was also present at Kelly and Alex's wedding.

- Brooks briefly portrays a parallel universe version of his character from Earth-X, where he was a member of an underground resistance against the New Reich, the Freedom Fighters. This James Olsen / Guardian is killed by Dark Arrow after a fight.
- In the season four crossover Elseworlds, Brooks portrays the Earth-1 version of Olsen, who works as a bodyguard for Cisco Ramon.

=== Alex Danvers ===
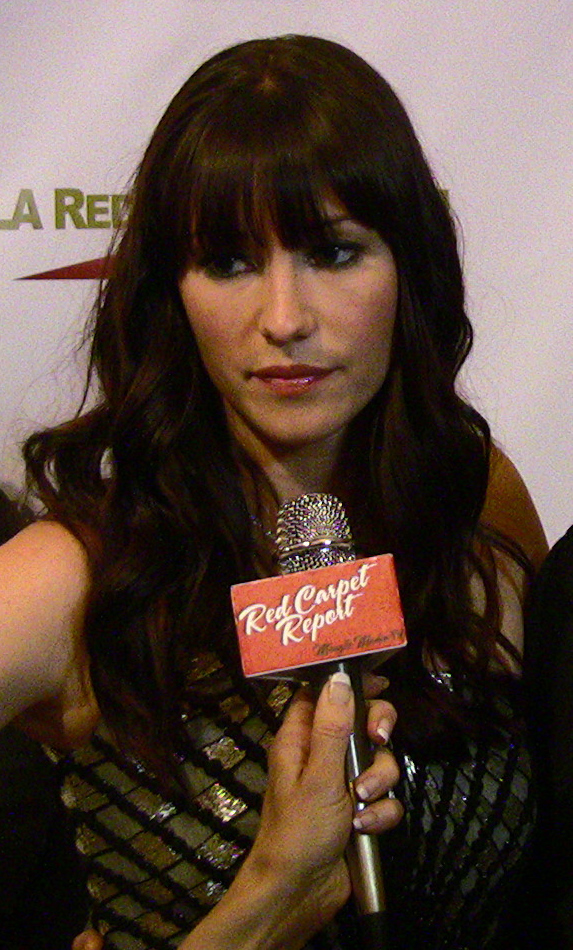
Chyler Leigh

Alexandra "Alex" Danvers (Chyler Leigh as an adult; seasons 1–6; Jordan Mazarati and Olivia Nikkanen as a teenager with the latter also portraying her VR counterpart) is Kara's adoptive sister. A brilliant scientist with a past as a party girl, she was hired by Hank Henshaw at the DEO after being arrested for drunk driving, in an effort to turn her life around and see potential in her. As Henshaw's protégée, Alex was personally trained by him in extensive combat, strategic tactics, and investigation after joining the DEO, eventually becoming his right-hand agent in the field. An exceptionally skilled combatant, marksman, tactician, and detective since, Alex tasks herself in providing rigorous training to Kara to decrease her reliance on her powers. Initially, like Kara, she becomes suspicious of the DEO and thus her own role upon learning of their father having worked there to protect Kara, but Alex ultimately learns that Henshaw is the Martian survivor J'onn J'onzz in shape-shifted disguise, whom her father (who she thought is dead) had rescued before his and the real Henshaw's deaths. After she is arrested and placed in custody for having known about J'onn, she and J'onn escape upon learning that her father is alive at Project Cadmus. She and J'onn are eventually pardoned by the President after they helped save the world from Non's attack with Kara and subsequently rejoin the DEO. Alex also obtains a kryptonite-powered exoskeleton from Non when she was under his mind control to fight Kara, which artificially enhances her strength and endurance when wearing it. She keeps the suit for later missions, while using a different power source, Omegahedron.

In season two, Alex realizes her homosexuality and pursues a relationship with National City PD's detective, Maggie Sawyer. She also confides in Sawyer her secret that she is a DEO agent and occasionally works together.

In season three, though Alex and Maggie were engaged to be married, but later they break it off after realizing their incompatibility as a couple, primarily based on Alex's desire to have kids, while Maggie had no yearning to do so. Alex meets Samantha Arias and her daughter Ruby, and envious of Samantha of her motherhood and adores Ruby. She befriends Samantha so that she can be close to Ruby, and hopes one day that she will have her own daughter like Samantha's. Alex had a one-night stand and develops a friendship with Sara Lance, a vigilante associate of Oliver Queen / Green Arrow and leader of the time-traveling superhero team, the Legends, from Earth-1; her encounter with Sara allows Alex to begin moving on from Maggie. She also befriends Barry Allen and Oliver when she arrives to attend the former's wedding with Kara. She joins Earth-1 heroes and Kara to stop Earth-X invaders' scheme against the multiverse, and partnered with Sara when Kara was preoccupied with her villainous parallel universe doppelgänger Overgirl. Her scientific background is also invaluable in helping fellow scientists Harry Wells, Caitlin Snow, Martin Stein, Felicity Smoak, and Barry on Earth-1. Alex learns from Overgirl that she may have her own counterpart on Earth-X when she reveals to Alex that her adoptive sister tried to kill her once, hinting that Overgirl's sister may not aligned herself with the New Reich. Nearing the end of the season, in addition to her exoskeleton, Winn made a prototypical DEO protective suit for Alex, which is filled with advanced gadgetry for her needs in the field. In one episode, Alex made a reference that she worked in a hospital in Seattle before becoming a federal agent. In a flashback, it is revealed that ten years previously, Alex first became close to Kara after investigating a murder mystery of their friend from high school together. By the end of season three, Alex becomes the new director of DEO.

In season four, Alex struggles with her new role as director, and her organization deals with a new wave of anti-extraterrestrial bigotry within the country. During the crossover, "Elseworlds", Kara meets Alex's Earth-1 counterpart, who is intrigued of learning the details of her Earth-38 self's life from Kara. To protect Kara from Haley, Alex has J'onn wipe her memory of her knowing that her sister is Supergirl. Though she later regains her memory of this after seeing Supergirl being beaten up by Red Daughter. After Supergirl is resuscitated by the sunlight, Alex gets a call from Colonel Haley about the true purpose of the Claymore satellite. Alex later assists James in fighting Agent Liberty on Shelly Island where she managed to get the Harun-El serum out of James and Agent Liberty.

In season five, Alex assists in the investigation of Leviathan. Following the Crisis which led to the creation of Earth-Prime, Alex is now the director of the DEO. which is now owned by LuthorCorp. She was surprised at that when Martian Manhunter restored her memories. Owing to Brainiac 5 working to help Lex Luthor combat Leviathan, Alex resigns from the DEO enabling Lex to swear in Brainiac 5 as the new Director of the DEO When her father died, Alex was reluctant to attend his funeral and used the Obsidian lens to do a Supergirl fantasy that started to affect her alongside the others that indulge in it. With help from Andrea Rojas, Kelly was able to get Alex out using a VR version of her younger self. Afterwards, Alex went to Midvale to attend her father's funeral. While fighting Rama Khan, Tezumak, and Sela, Alex started wearing a new suit provided to her by Martian Manhunter.

In season six, Alex assists in the fight of Lex Luthor. While advised by Lena to inform Kelly about Supergirl's identity, Alex is persuaded by Martian Manhunter to take on the Sentinel alias. By the end of season six, Alex marries Kelly and they adopted a young alien orphan girl called Esme.

=== Winn Schott ===
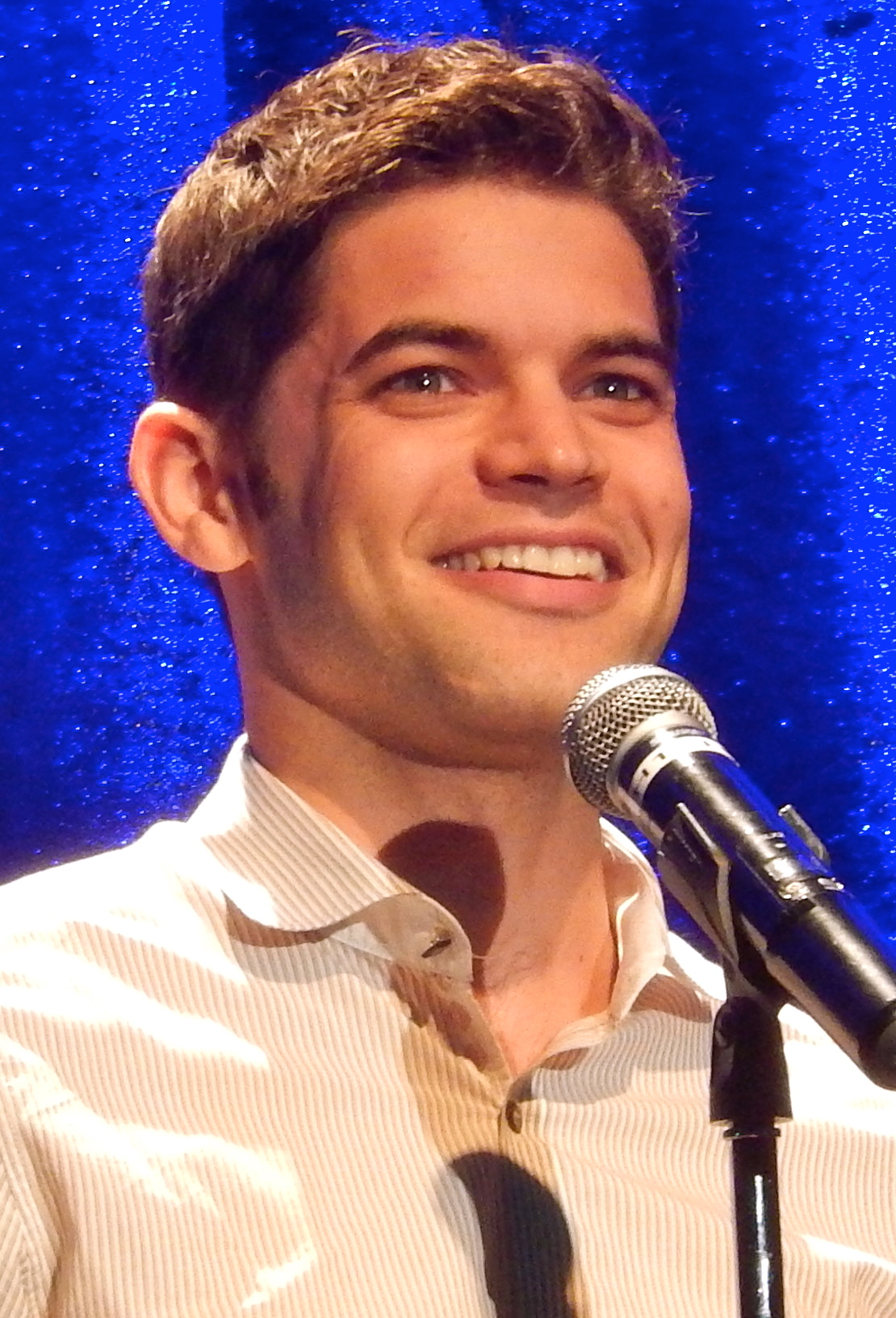
Jeremy Jordan

Winslow "Winn" Schott Jr. (Jeremy Jordan; main: seasons 1–3; guest: seasons 5–6) is a tech expert who works alongside Kara at CatCo and serves as one of her allies, helping her develop her costume and aiding her in her adventures as Supergirl. Winn has an unrequited crush on Kara and is rivals with James for her affection, and he later pursued a relationship with Cat's new assistant Siobhan Smythe until she turns into Supergirl's supernatural metahuman archenemy Silver Banshee. In the series, he is the son of Toyman.

In season two, he has left CatCo for a full-time position at the DEO recruited by Alex Danvers and J'onn J'onzz. He and James also become best friends. Winn is responsible for helping James to become the Guardian while he is called the man in the van by James. In addition to remain improving Kara's costume and offers her tech support, Winn also makes his own modifications with her interdimensional extrapolator, a device she received from Earth-1's metahuman inventor Cisco Ramon.

In season three, Winn helps in the fight against the Worldkillers. By the end of season three, Winn is invited to join the Legion of Super-Heroes as he invented the sub-atomic shield and its development saves countless people in the future. Together with Mon-El, he travels into future for saving it, starting his own journey as a hero.

Jeremy Jordan returns to the series in its fifth season. He returns to the present in pursuit of his doppelganger who has done things that caused the real Winn to be wanted for terrorism. Winn does give advice to Nia about certain things while referencing her descendant. Supergirl and the DEO were able to thwart the attempt of the lives of Andrea Rojas and those present at her presentation, but Toyman perishes. This changes Winn's future where he no longer a wanted man. When his alternate counterpart's mind is uploaded into the DEO's computers, Winn enters the computers and reluctantly accepts the aid of his father's digital consciousness. Winn was able to stop the hack as Toyman and the alternate Toyman are deleted. At one point, Winn mentioned that he was called Computer Lad by a member of the Legion of Super Heroes. As he plans to return to the future, Winn plans to become a different Toyman.

In season six, Toyman appears to help fight Lex Luthor and Nyxlygsptlnz. He later appears at Alex and Kelly's wedding where he hints to J'onn that he and Miss Martian will have a son while also mentioning to Kara and Jimmy that Mister Mxyzptlk owes Alex and Kelly a wish.

- During the "Crisis on Earth-X" crossover, an Earth-X version of Winn is introduced that is also portrayed by Jordan. He is the leader of the Freedom Fighters working against the New Reich on his world and thus Dark Arrow's chief adversary.
- Jordan also portrays a version of Winn from an unnamed reality. He took on the mantle of Toyman following the death of his father and shares his vendetta on Chester Dunholz as well as the Rojas family. It is because of Toyman's actions that cause Winn to be wanted for terrorism in the future. Toyman was freed from a prison transport by Brainiac 5 on Lex Luthor's behalf. In his plot, he planned to dispose of Andrea Rojas that involved robotic white tigers. While Supergirl and the DEO fought the robotic white tigers, Winn confronted Toyman. Toyman perished after activating the dead man switch to a bomb he made, but Supergirl was able to save everyone from the explosion. It turns out that he used the Obsidian Tech lenses to upload himself into the DEO's computer at the last minute to access the Internet. With help from the digital copy of his dad's conscious, Winn enters the codes while Toyman subdues his son's alternate counterpart. Once Winn finishes entering the codes, both digital consciousnesses are deleted.

=== J'onn J'onzz / Martian Manhunter ===
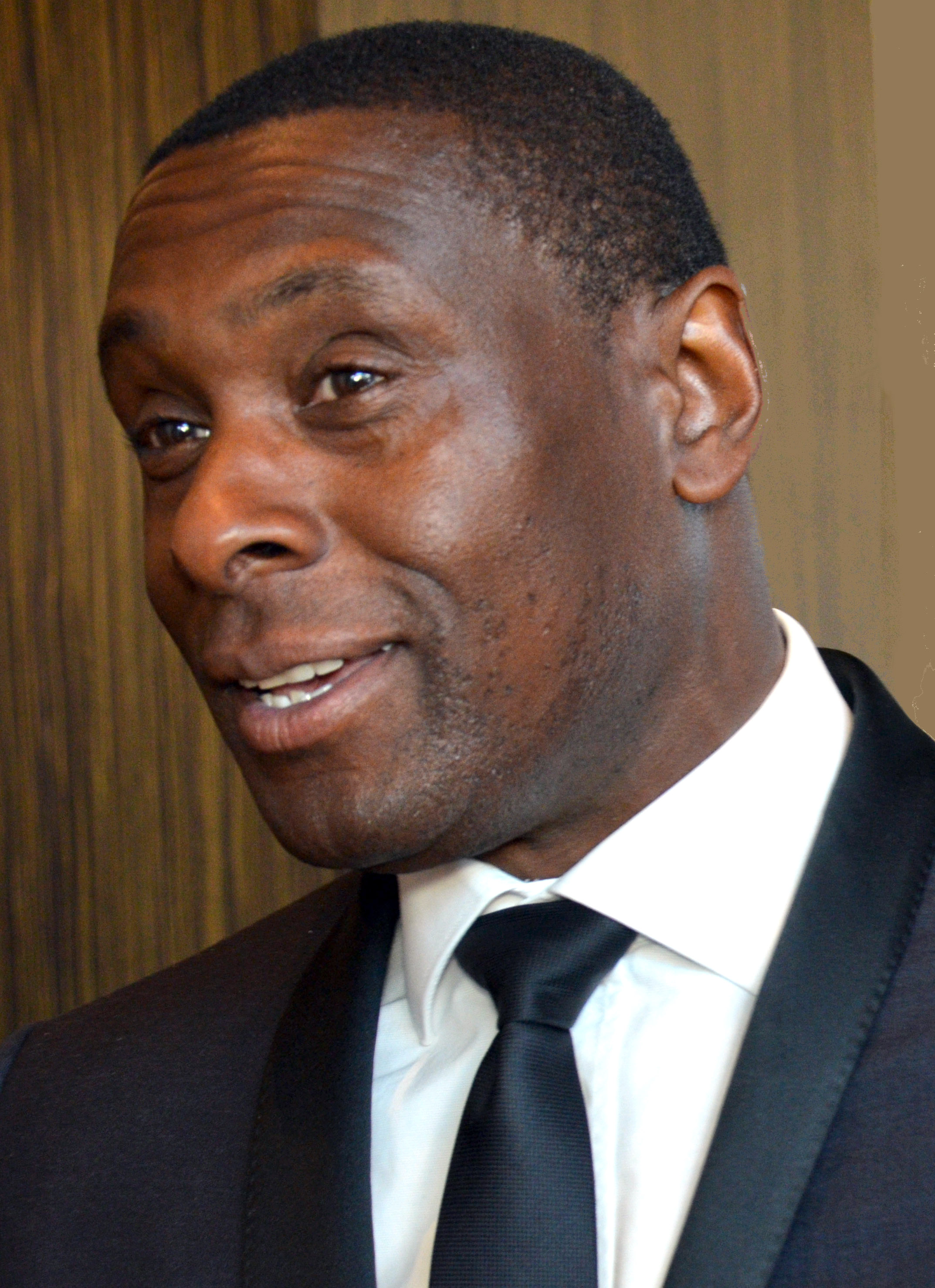
David Harewood

J'onn J'onzz (David Harewood; seasons 1–6) is the head of the DEO who takes Hank Henshaw's likeness after Henshaw is killed in Peru while hunting J'onn. J'onn takes Henshaw's likeness to reform the DEO from within as well as a promise to Jeremiah Danvers to watch over Alex and Kara, who each subsequently trust him as a mentor after learning of his true identity. Prior to his escape from the holocaust on Mars, J'onn was a law enforcement officer to his people. In addition to his powers, J'onn learned various skills and knowledge after living on Earth over decades including martial arts, strategy, investigation tactics, in addition telepathically learned some of Henshaw's memories and knowledge, making him a formidable opponent when in human form without the need of his extraterrestrial abilities and more than capable to run the DEO in Henshaw's place. He takes Alex in as his protégée and forges her as a strong DEO agent, eventually she becomes his right-hand operative. In the episode "Falling", J'onn reveals to the whole world his true identity to stop Kara, who is affected by Red Kryptonite, from killing Alex. He is then arrested by the DEO agents who are at the scene, only to escape with Alex upon learning that Jeremiah has survived the attack and that he is being held at Project Cadmus, a facility that experiments with aliens and where he was going to be taken.

In season two, J'onn begins a romantic relationship with a benevolent member of the White Martian race, M'gann M'orzz.

In season three, it is revealed that J'onn's father is alive and they struggle to reconcile of their relationship. His spaceship is disguised as a 1952 vintage Chevrolet Deluxe convertible, in which J'onn, Kara, and Alex love to drive for pleasure. By the end of season three, after he succeeds the memory and knowledge from his father, J'onn leaves the DEO.

In season four, J'onn helps run a support group for aliens trying to integrate into Earth society. He also begins a career as a private investigator. He eschews combat, preferring to provide guidance and mentorship. He warns Kara of a rising wave of anti-alien bigotry. In addition, he starts to go after Manchester Black. During the fight at Shelly Island where they were imprisoned, J'onn and Dreamer use their abilities to overload the core of the satellite before it can be fired on Argo where Superman is.

In season five, J'onn assisted in the investigation of Leviathan and deals with his brother Malefic. After reconciling with Malefic and sending him to meet with M'gann, J'onn is approached by the Monitor who stated that he passed this test to prepare himself for the upcoming Crisis. Following the Crisis which led to the formation of Earth-Prime, J'onn worked to restore the memories of their allies as well as assisted in fighting the Anti-Monitor. J'onn later provided Alex with a special suit to help in the fight against Leviathan.

In season six, J'onn assists in the fight against Lex Luthor while joining M'gann to use a Martian ritual to destroy the satellites. While Malefic is unable to help locate the part of the Phantom Zone that Lex Luthor sent her to, J'onn informs Alex that M'gann is enlisting someone who can help and tells the story of Norr Cott who operated as the Sentinel. He then advises Alex to take on the Sentinel alias. Following the defeat of Lex and Nyxlygsptlnz, J'onn officiates Alex and Kelly's wedding. Toyman does drop a hint to him that he and M'gann will have a son.

The evolution of Henshaw was discussed during the filming of the pilot, with the executive producers jokingly saying that Harewood would be a good actor to play the Martian Manhunter in a potential television series, to which DC Comics' Geoff Johns asked why it could not be done in Supergirl. Harewood reflected that he had a difficult time "find[ing] an angle to play Hank Henshaw" in the pilot, and became excited when he was told about the change for his character's backstory.

==== Hank Henshaw / Cyborg Superman ====
Harewood also recurs as the real Hank Henshaw, a former CIA agent and ex-head of the DEO who is ruthless and obsessed with hunting down aliens he believed to be dangerous. He died after he stabbed Jeremiah Danvers in Peru while hunting the alien J'onn J'onzz. Hank was subsequently found and revived by Project Cadmus, who enhanced him to become the Cyborg Superman.

In season five, a virtual reality version of Hank Henshaw stole a warhead in a plot to regain the DEO After capturing Kara, he is defeated by Alex as Supergirl.

=== Cat Grant ===
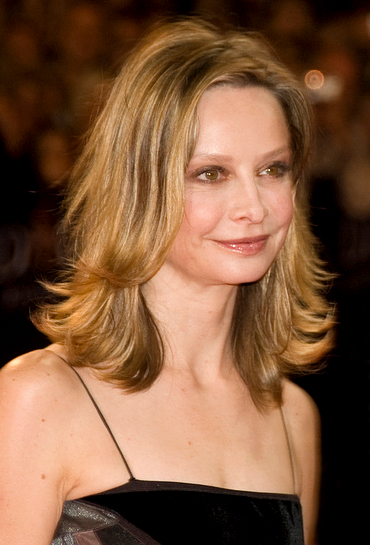
Calista Flockhart

Cat Grant (Calista Flockhart; main: season 1; recurring: season 2; guest: seasons 3–4 & 6, Eliza Helm as a younger Cat in season 6) is the founder and CEO of CatCo Worldwide Media, who feels, since she "branded" Kara as "Supergirl", that she has proprietary custody over the new hero. She was the personal assistant to Perry White prior to being a gossip columnist at the Daily Planet. Cat investigates and reveals that Supergirl is Superman's cousin, which then causes her to become a target for some of Superman's enemies. She also serves as a mentor to Kara, dispensing advice about being a woman in a man's world. In the episode "Hostile Takeover", she begins to suspect that Kara is Supergirl, while the second-season finale reveals she knew Kara was Supergirl all along.

Flockhart became a recurring actress for season two, due to the series' production shift to Vancouver and her desire to take on projects near her Los Angeles home. To accommodate this, Cat decides to take a leave of absence from CatCo, leaving James in charge during the second episode of season two. She returns in the final two episodes to help protect National City from the Daxamite invasion. Flockhart remained a recurring guest star for season three.

In the first episode of season three, it is revealed that Cat has become Olivia Marsdin's Press Secretary.

In season five, a possible reality shown to Supergirl by Mxyzptlk revealed that Cat was among Kara's loved ones who were killed by the Children of Liberty when Kara was provoked to reveal her identity after the Children of Liberty abducted Lena Luthor and Thomas Coville.

In season six, a younger Cat Grant, going by "CJ Grant" as Perry White called her, comes to Midvale to look for the source of Midvale's luck to outdo Lois Lane's story and runs into a younger Alex posing as Eliza Danvers. After attempts to get close to Supergirl that led to her encounter with Naxim Tork, Dreamer in her Brenda alias persuades her to branch off from the Daily Bugle. Cat is later called up by Perry and informs him of her resignation while telling her to call her Cat Grant. Following the defeat of Lex Luthor and Nyxlygsptlnz, Cat calls up Kara offering her the position of editor-in-chief after buying CatCo back from Andrea Rojas. She also figured out that Kara is Supergirl and persuades her to come forward with revealed it to the world.

=== Mon-El ===
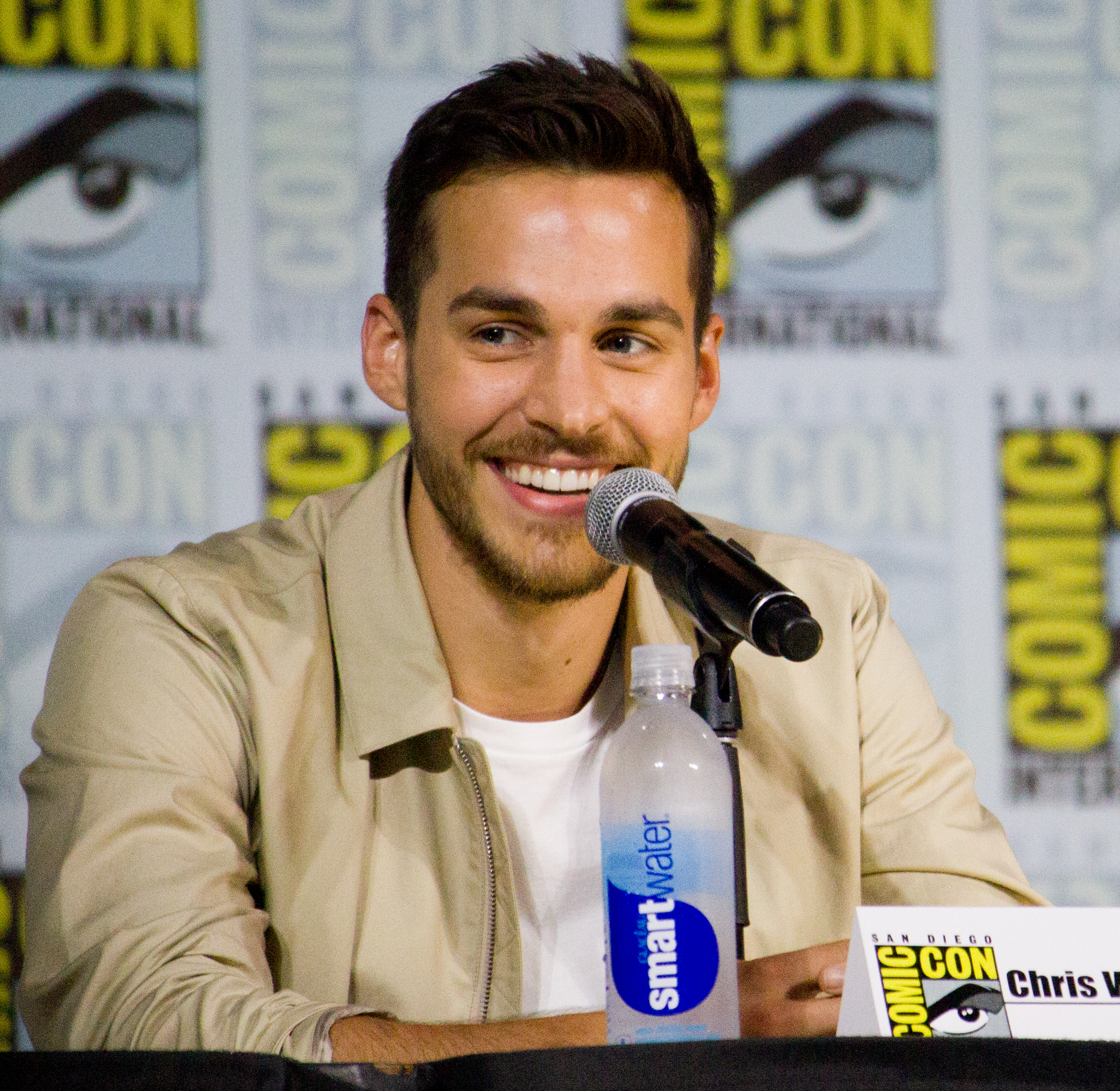
Chris Wood

Mon-El (Chris Wood; main: seasons 2–3; guest: seasons 5–6) is a survivor and prince of a royal family from the planet Daxam who seeks to become a superhero on Earth. Owing to Daxamites being an offshoot of Kryptonians, Mon-El has similar powers to Superman and Supergirl. Mon-El crash lands on Earth in an escape pod at the end of season one. His carefree and somewhat laid-back nature leads to friction with Kara as she mentors him in the ways of being a hero. Mon-El eventually falls in love with Kara and they become a couple. After Kara triggers a weapon that laces the atmosphere with lead dust to stop Rhea's Daxamite army, Mon-El is forced to leave Earth.

In season three, it is revealed that Mon-El's pod was sucked into a wormhole and he time-traveled to the 31st century. He was in the future for seven years, where L-Corp administered a serum that gives him immunity to lead poisoning. Despite his love for Kara, Mon-El ultimately marries Imra Ardeen before he returns to the 21st century with her and other passengers for an unknown mission. He is also revealed to be the founder of the superhero team, the Legion.

In between seasons three and four, Mon-El and the other Legionnaires returned to the 31st century, though Brainy stayed behind.

In season five, Mon-El is shown in some possible realities that Mxyzptlk shows Kara. The first one has him and Lena falling in battle against Reign. Another reality where Supergirl and Lena didn't meet as Mon-El as part of a resistance against Lena and her Hope-Bots.

In season six, Mon-El is among those that help the Super Friends fight Lex Luthor and Nyxlygsptlnz. Afterwards, Mon-El tells Supergirl that he won't be returning to her time again.

=== Maggie Sawyer ===
Maggie Sawyer (Floriana Lima; main: season 2; recurring: season 3) is a detective for the National City Police Department who takes a special interest in the cases involving aliens, metahumans, and other extraordinary occurrences. She uses her own experience as a lesbian to help guide Alex as the latter struggles to understand her own sexuality, and the two eventually begin a romantic relationship. However, in season three because Maggie does not want to have children, Alex breaks up with her, with Maggie telling Alex that she'll be a great mom when the time comes.

Lima became a recurring actress for season three. She noted the role was only intended to last for one season.

=== Lena Luthor ===
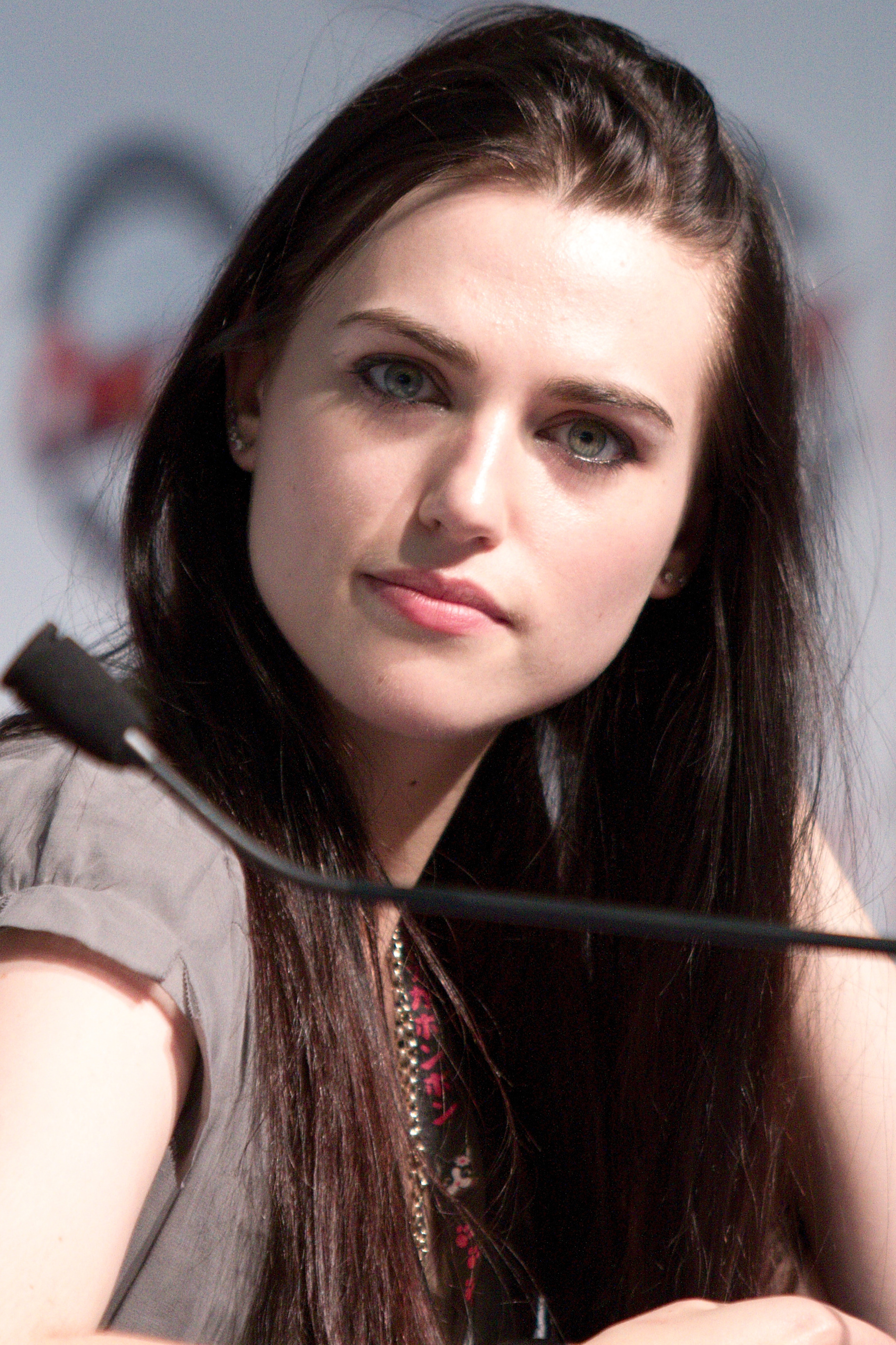
Katie McGrath

Lena Kieran Luthor (Katie McGrath; main: seasons 3–6; recurring: season 2, Lucy Loken as a teenager) is the CEO of L-Corp (formerly known as Luthor Corp) and the younger paternal half-sister of Lex Luthor. She arrives in National City after Lex has been incarcerated, hoping to rebrand Luthor Corp as a force for good. As the daughter of Lionel Luthor, to whom she is close, Lena tries to redeem her family name after Lex's crimes have tarnished it and to break from her half-brother and step-mother's legacy. Lena is Lionel's illegitimate child from his extramarital affair. Lena meets Kara after Kara tags along with her cousin, Clark Kent, to interview Lena about L-Corp. Shortly after, the two develop a strong friendship. Later in the season she is taken advantage of by Rhea, under guise of fixing the portal to get her home, but instead brought all the Daxamites to Earth. She is almost married off to Mon-El before the wedding is interrupted and they escape where she then aids her mother and Winn in driving away the Daxamites with a lead bomb. Camille Marty portrays a young Lena. McGrath was promoted to series regular for season three.

In season three, she buys CatCo Media to prevent Morgan Edge from taking it over and decides to run CatCo personally, temporarily handing over control of L-Corp to Sam Arias. Unlike her half-brother, Lena is able to develop a formula to create synthetic Kryptonites. By the end of season 3, Lena synthesizes the Kryptonian mineral Harun-El in her laboratory since it is a form of Black Kryptonite, and starts the phase 2 of her experiment.

In season four, Lena helped to make a special suit for Supergirl when the air was saturated with Kryptonite. Lex later invites Lena and Lillian to the White House to watch the destruction of Argo. After an incident at Shelly Island causes Lex to leave, Lena and Lillian fight their way past Lex's henchmen. After Lex teleports to safety upon his armor being destroyed, he arrives in a room where Lena removes the Harun-El from him. Before succumbing to his wounds, Lex spitefully reveals to Lena that Kara is Supergirl; leaving her bitter and heartbroken.

In season five, this perceived betrayal has led Lena to go down a dark path; similar to Lex and Lillian respectively. She sells CatCo to her old friend Andrea Rojas to spite Kara while running some simulations with her A.I. Hope. In addition, she also blackbags Eve, Using a miniature device on Eve's head, Lena maps out Eve's brain. Andrea visits Lena voicing her knowledge about Lena's misuse of her products and states that she is cut off. If she ever does anything against her, Andrea will see to it that the next story will expose Lena's experiments. Afterwards, Lena moves on to Plan B where she reveals that she mapped out the loyalty parts of Eve's brain where she uploads Hope into it enabling Hope to control Eve's body. After being visited by Andrea, Lena provides the diversion for Supergirl so that Acrata can spring Rip Roar out of DEO custody. Once that was done, Andrea gave Lena the medallion. Then she has her computers research Eve's brain for any information about Leviathan. After Lex was revived, he said that he would help Monitor in exchange for a favor that involved Lena. When the Crisis began, Lena was persuaded by Alex to help work on a transporter to transport everyone from Earth-38 to Earth-1, resulting in Lena saving billions of lives. Following the Crisis which led to the formation of Earth-Prime, Lena still had her memories as part of Lex's deal with the Monitor and that she and Lex are now co-CEO's of LuthorCorp. In addition, Lena finds that Lillian is the head of the Luthor Foundation. Lena reluctantly had to cooperate with her two family members as Lex used a truth-enforcing organism on himself. Following the Non Nocere experiment failing on the inmates, Lena learned from Lex that her project would fail anyway and he had only assisted her to see her realise that she was wrong. Rejecting her brother's offer to join his own plans of conquest, and horrified to realise that she had become the same kind of villain as her brother, Lena returned to Kara to warn her about Lex's plans. Lena makes an Anti-Kryptonite suit that wasn't on Earth-Prime so that Supergirl can fight Rama Khan, Tezumak, and Sela who are empowered by Kryptonite while also rescuing William Dey from Eve. When Supergirl enters virtual reality to put an end to the Unity Festival plot, Lena had to protect her physical body when Acrata is dispatched. Lena was able to talk her down. Afterwards, Supergirl and Lena plan to go after Lex.

In season six, Lena helps to thwart the plans of Lex and Lillian. When Lex was incarcerated at the National City Prison and being visited by Lillian, Lena appears and uses the Myriad to erase their memories of Supergirl's identity and then gives Myriad back to Alex. Owing to Lex having Otis sabotage the new children's hospital wing and considering that killing him won't solve anything, Lena informs Lex that she is leaving LuthorCorp. She joins the Tower, using her scientific and technological expertise to help J'onn J'onzz, Alex, and the other Super Friends. She learns that her birth mother was a practitioner of magic, and that she possesses the same ability. As a scientist, she is reluctant to accept this, but she ultimately embraces magic to fight Nyxly, a fifth-dimensional imp; who uses fifth-dimensional energy which is similar to magic. A dying Lillian tells Lena that she knew about her birth mother's magic, and steered Lena towards science because of it; Lillian urges Lena to choose her own path, free from anyone's expectations. After Nyxly's defeat, Lena establishes the Lena Luthor Foundation.

=== Samantha Arias / Reign ===
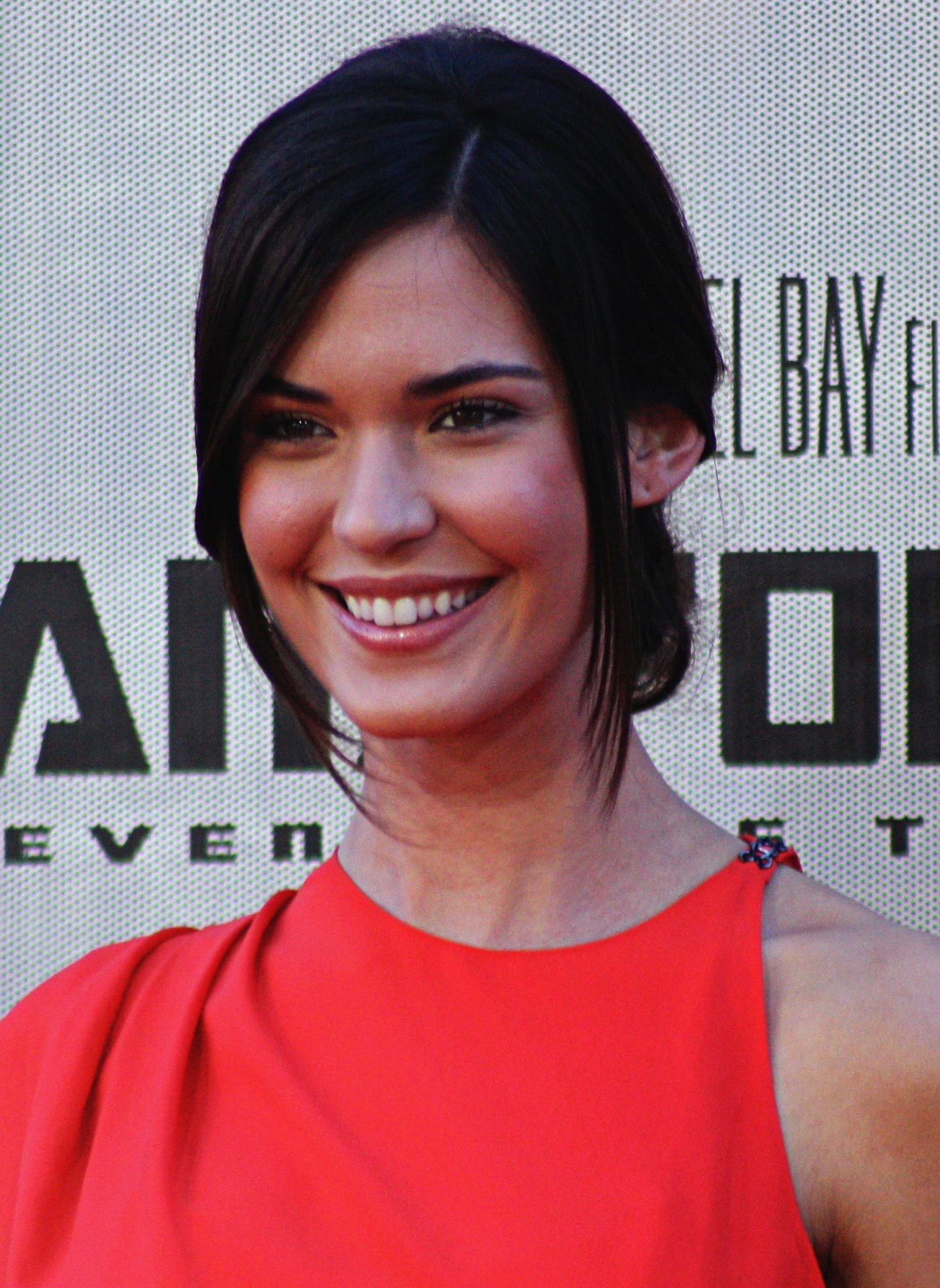
Odette Annable

Samantha "Sam" Arias/Reign (Odette Annable; main: season 3; guest: season 5) is an unknowing Kryptonian survivor sent to Earth by a party of Kryptonian priestesses as an infant prior to its destruction. Sam was adopted by Patricia Arias. Although she grew up without knowledge of her origins, she is sensing that there is something unusual within herself and fears it. Samantha is also a single mother who struggles to raise her daughter Ruby, having distanced herself from her adoptive mother when she became pregnant with her daughter as a teenager. At one point, Sam demonstrated superhuman strength that let her lift a fallen tower off of her daughter Ruby during a terrorist attack; but she believes her strength in the moment was merely derived from adrenaline and the heightened emotion of distress, and she loses the extra strength immediately after. She works with Lena Luthor, and is promoted to be the acting CEO of L-Corp after Lena Luthor buys CatCo, and later becomes its CFO. She and her daughter also later befriend Alex and Kara Danvers. Throughout the season, Sam forms close friendships with Lena, Alex, and Kara. She finds out from her adoptive mother that she arrived on Earth in a space pod and thus she is an extraterrestrial in origin. Under the pod key's guidance, Sam travels to a desert that leads her to a hidden Fortress Of Solitude of her own, called the Fortress Of Sanctuary, where a hologram in the form of one of the dark priestesses, Selena, informs Sam of her heritage and that she is engineered as a "Worldkiller," a living biological weapon of enhanced Kryptonian physiology who was sent to rule Earth; her pregnancy kept her from coming into her powers. Sam was not willing to accept this, but her full powers manifested, awakening her dormant alternative personality Reign. By the end of the season, it is revealed that Selena is Reign's birth mother, therefore is Sam's as well.

After returning home, Sam remains a devoted mother to Ruby with no memories of her actions as Reign, while her Kryptonian alter-ego becomes a black-clad, masked vigilante who murders those she sees as evildoers. However, Reign and two other Worldkillers are each designed to have dissociative identity to keep their existences hidden, yet Sam is stronger than Reign in willpower and control because of her devotion to Ruby, keeping Reign from fully taking over. During her first encounter with Kara's alter-ego Supergirl, Reign battles and defeats her, leaving the superheroine in a coma for days.

After Supergirl emerges from her coma, Reign is at odds with her, the DEO, and the Legion. Reign learned that there are more Worldkillers on Earth and seeks to find them. She manages to get Purity on her side when she surrenders to Reign.

Following the deaths of Purity and Pestilence, Reign absorbed their abilities and got away. Reign later targets Ruby to eliminate Sam's will for control, causing Supergirl and Alex Danvers to work in protecting her. Thanks to some Kryptonite, Supergirl, Mon-El, and Kara were able to incapacitate her enough to render her unconscious as they work to find a way to eliminate the Reign side of her. Later, using a mineral from Krypton called the Harun-El, which is a form of Black Kryptonite, they are able to split Sam from Reign. Sam joins the fight against Reign and the dark priestesses after being endowed with powers that match Reign's. In one timeline, Sam kills Reign, but at the cost of her own life and her allies, but Supergirl travels back in time, and changes the outcome of Reign's defeat and averted the deaths. In the reset timeline, though still defeating Reign by herself, because of another exposure to the Harun-El during the fight, Sam is rid of the Kryptonian side of her, therefore having no powers once more and a chance to again live a normal life with her daughter.

In season four's premiere, it is mentioned that Sam and Ruby have relocated to Metropolis, where Sam is heading L-Corp's northeast sector.

In season five, Mxyzptlk showed Kara some possible realities that Reign is in. The first one showed that Reign killed Lena Luthor and Mon-El before being taken down by Supergirl. A reality in which Supergirl and Lena didn't meet showed that Reign became one of Lena's enforcers.

=== Querl Dox / Brainiac 5 ===
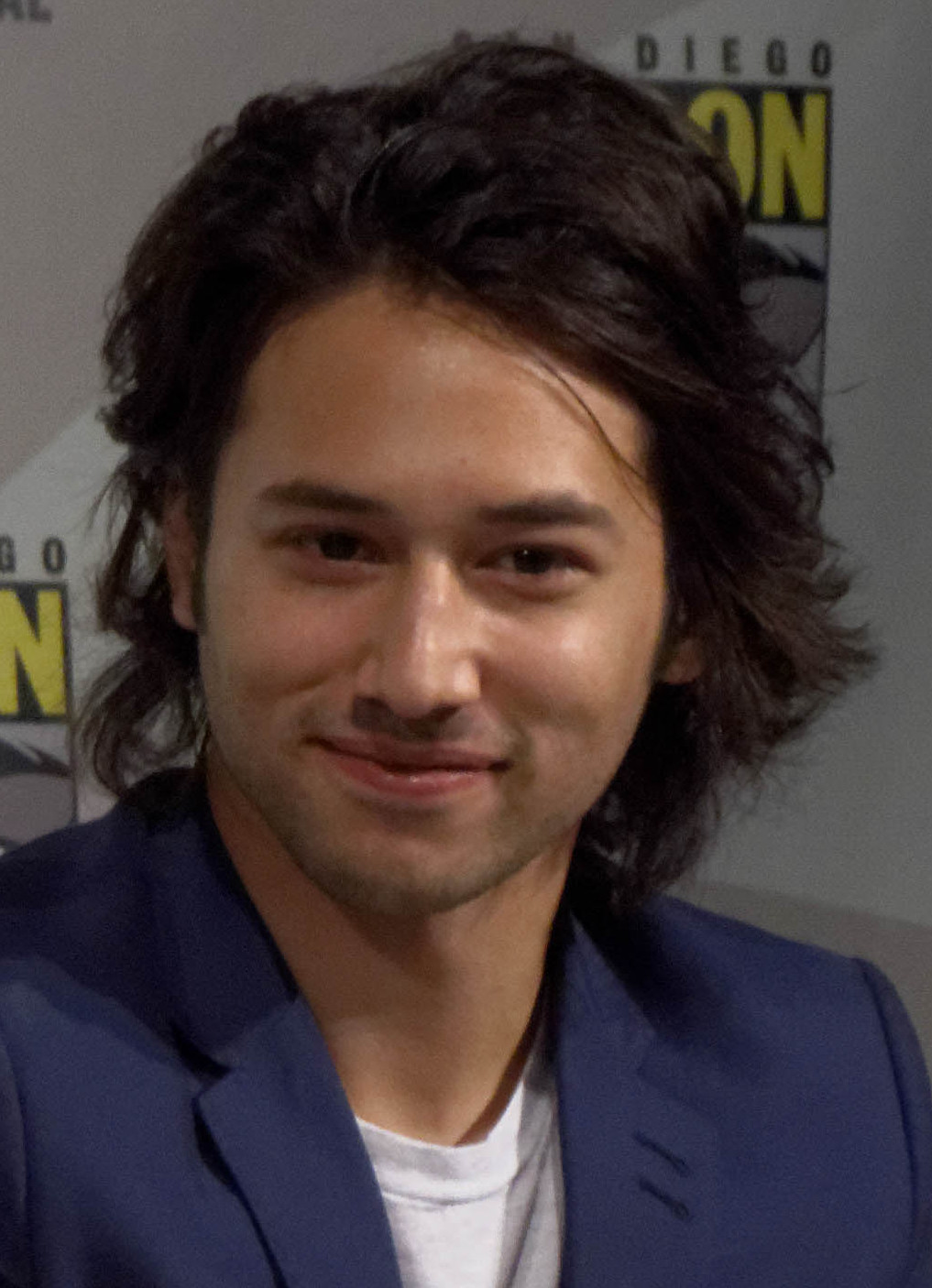
Jesse Rath

Querl Dox/Brainiac 5 (Jesse Rath; main: seasons 4–6; recurring: season 3) is a Coluan hero from the 31st century who arrives in National City to help Supergirl battle Reign. Rath was promoted to series regular for season four.

In season five, Brainiac 5 helped to investigate Leviathan. Following the Crisis, Brainiac 5 encountered different doppelgangers of himself including a dead eyepatch-wearing Brainiac 5, an evil Brainiac 5 who bottled his Earth during the Crisis, a ponytail-sporting Brainiac 5 (all three also portrayed by Jesse Rath), and a female Brainiac 5 (voiced by Meaghan Rath) who is the director of her DEO. The evil Brainiac 5 plans to open the bottle with the help of the witches and release his world in Al's Bar, not caring that this would destroy Earth-Prime. Brainy Prime removes his three personality inhibitors, assuming his true Coluan colors and powers. He promises the anguished Brainiac 5 that he will search for a safe way to open it someday. The three Kryptonian witches agree and join the evil Brainiac in his bottled world. The two remaining Brainiac 5 doppelgangers choose to give up their corporal forms and exist inside the Big Brain, the "Coluan knowledge aggregate." Before she leaves, the female Brainy warns Brainy Prime that he must give up everything and everyone and appear to work with Lex Luthor to stop the threat of Leviathan. After breaking up with Nia, Brainiac 5 visits Lex Luthor about Leviathan. He frees the alternate Winn and brings him to Lex. Outside of Winn, Alex finds out about Brainy working with Lex to uncover Leviathan and what his female counterpart said. When Alex resigns, Brainy becomes the new Director of the DEO. His work with Lex also strained his relationship with Dreamer. During the fight against Leviathan, Brainiac 5 enters their ship. Guided by the female Brainiac 5, he activates the code that disables Leviathan as he bottles up Rama Khan, Tezumak, and Sela. Owing to being weakened by the ship's defenses, Brainiac 5 has the bottle taken from him by Lex Luthor as Dreamer heads off to find Brainiac 5.

In season six, Brainiac 5 is saved by Dreamer and explains to her why he had to push her away. It took Martian nanites to help Brainiac 5 recover. Near the end of the season, Brainiac 5 intended to return to his time and merge with the Big Brain, but was unable to go through with it due to his love for Nia.

=== Ben Lockwood / Agent Liberty ===
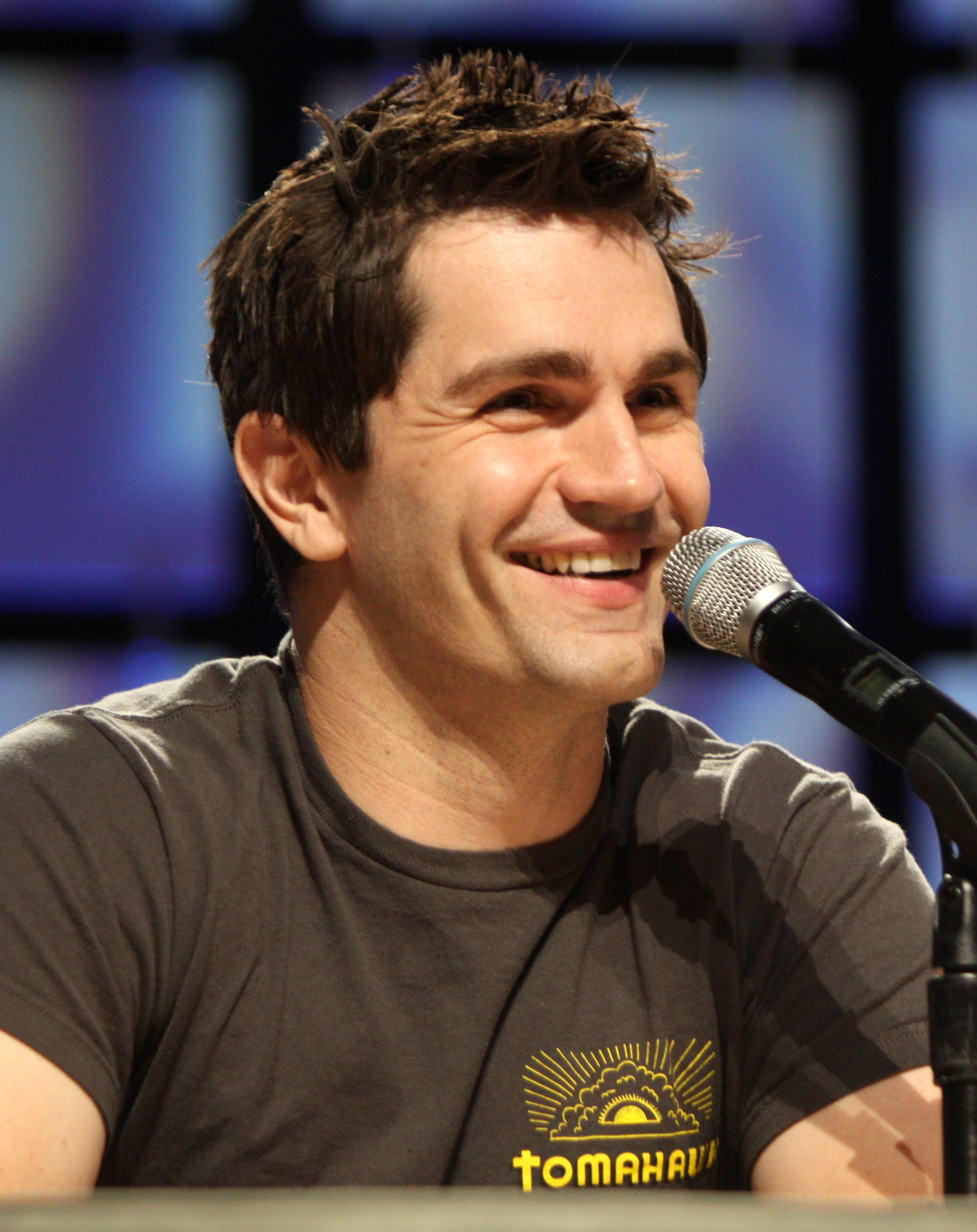
Sam Witwer

Benjamin "Ben" Lockwood/Agent Liberty (Sam Witwer; main: season 4; guest: season 5) is a former college professor who became an anti-aliens extremist after suffering a series of misfortunes, including the loss of his business, home, and father over the course several alien attacks. With the aid of Mercy and Otis Graves, secretly along with Lex Luthor from prison, Ben becomes a self-proclaimed "Agent of Liberty" and founds a human supremacist group called the Children of Liberty to rid Earth of all alien life, including Supergirl. After winning a debate against Kara Danvers on national television, Ben is given his own weekly show named "The Lockdown" whilst secretly operating as the masked Agent Liberty. Ben and his organization go on to kill numerous aliens in National City, including Manchester Black's fiancée, Fiona Byrne.

Ben subsequently comes to blows with a revenge-driven Manchester, who kidnaps Ben's wife Lydia and reveals her husband's alter-ego. Supergirl ultimately intervenes and apprehends them both. Ben is publicly exposed as the Children of Liberty's leader and taken into police custody. However, a large crowd of his supporters, including Lydia, protest Ben's imprisonment.

Ben later enlists his son George to get involved with the Children of Liberty on his behalf. He is eventually pardoned by President Baker under the cause that the Children of Liberty's terrorism does not apply to humans, despite the Alien Amnesty Act. Baker later invites Ben to the White House, where he makes him the Director of Alien Affairs. With his new authority, Ben grows more dangerous in his agenda, including beating his underlings into submission. He begins using the president's martial law to round up all alien residents in the United States, intending on committing genocide. After Lydia is murdered in retaliation for his actions, Ben injects himself with Lena Luthor's experimental Harun-El serum and gains superhuman powers to avenge the death of his wife. However, his vendetta strains his relationship with George, who becomes disillusioned with his father.

Ben later learns from Otis about Lex's plot to redeem himself by using and betraying the Children of Liberty and Kaznian invaders, causing Ben to kill Otis. Starting to fall ill from the experimental serum and no longer having any reason to his goals, Ben attempts to take revenge on Lex for manipulating him but is ultimately stopped by Kara, Alex Danvers and James Olsen. After a grueling battle, Ben and James simultaneously de-power one another. After Lex's plot is exposed, Baker is impeached and arrested while Ben is then imprisoned for his crimes of domestic terrorism. Ben watches from prison as his son begins speaking out for the cooperation of humans and aliens alike.

In season five, Mxyzptlk showed Kara a possible reality where she revealed her secret to Lena from the start. Here, Ben started hating Supergirl after his family died in a misguided attempt to get her to save them. Ben and Otis abducted Lena and Thomas Coville to coerce Supergirl to reveal her identity. This works and Supergirl saves Lena and Thomas at the cost of the Children of Liberty targeting her loved ones.

=== Nia Nal / Dreamer ===
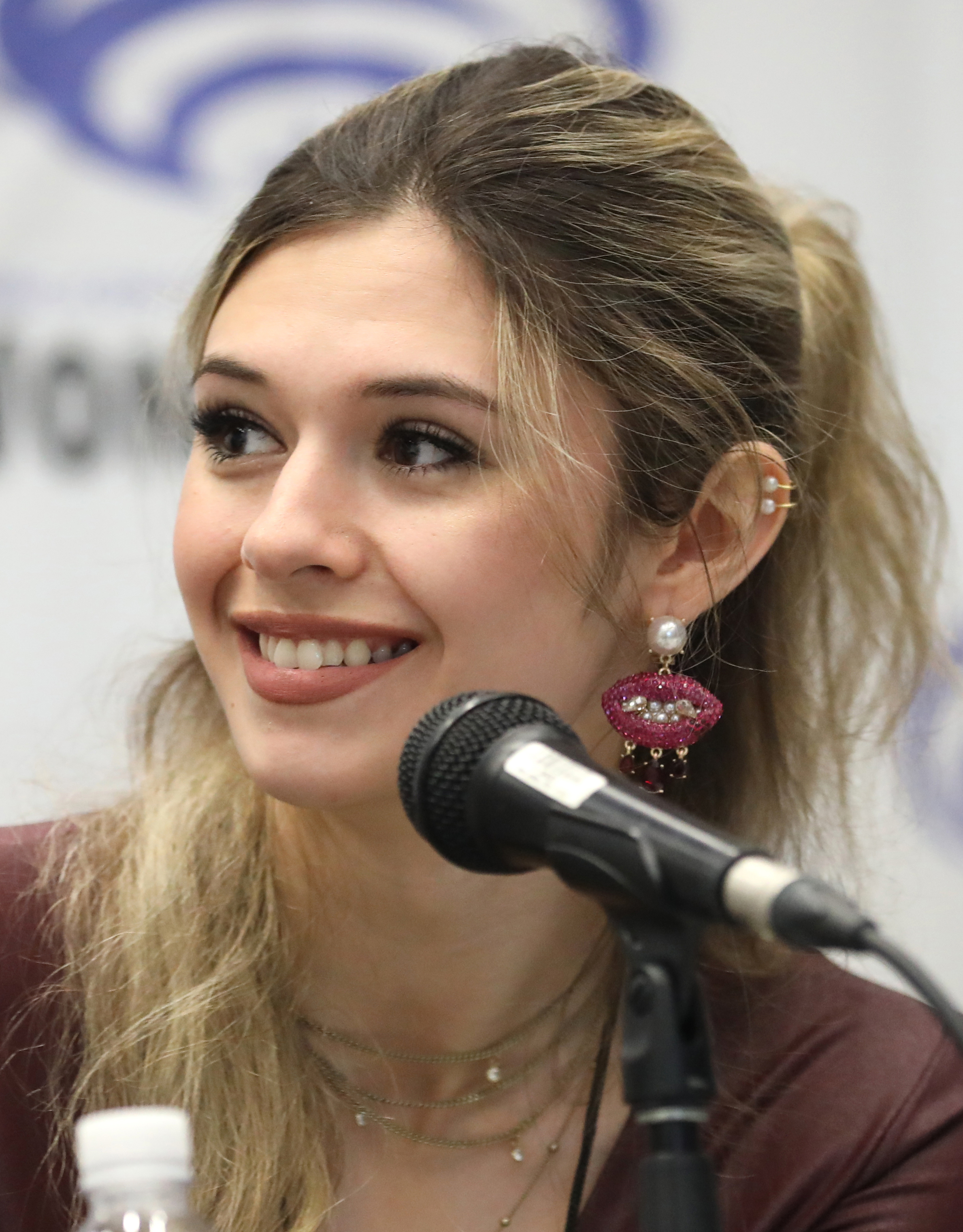
Nicole Maines

Nia Nal (Nicole Maines; seasons 4–6) is a transgender woman working at CatCo under Kara Danvers. Introduced in the fourth season, Nia was announced as television's first transgender superhero, with Maines joining the series as a regular cast member. She is an original character who is based on the DC Comics character Nura Nal, who happens to be her descendant in the show.

She was a political speechwriter in Washington, D.C. where she worked for Cat Grant, the White House Press Secretary, under the administration of President Olivia Marsdin. She was sent to National City to be taken under the wing of Kara Danvers / Supergirl to learn the ways of reporting and superheroism. During the fourth season, Nia discovers that she has inherited dream-based powers from her mother and begins developing the superhero identity Dreamer.

=== Lauren Haley ===
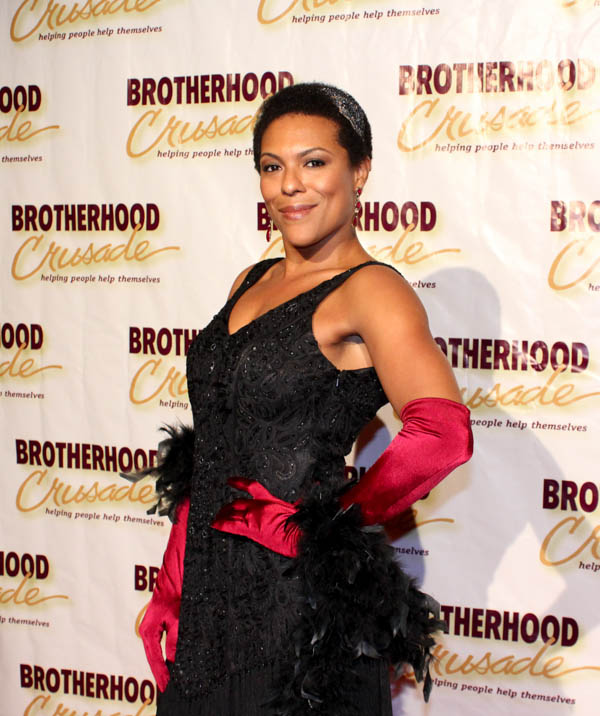
April Parker Jones

Lauren Haley (April Parker Jones; season 4) is a United States Marine Corps colonel brought in by President Baker to supervise Danvers.

After Supergirl and Brainiac 5 defeated Agent Liberty and Manchester Black, Haley works to find out who Supergirl is. When she finds out that Supergirl is Kara Danvers, Martian Manhunter uses his abilities to erase her memory of this discovery.

Haley soon starts to doubt President Baker's motives like when a satellite to be used against the aliens nearly crashes which she had no knowledge to when confronted by Alex, making Benjamin Lockwood the Director of Alien Affairs, and declaring Supergirl public enemy #1 after Red Daughter posed as Supergirl and attacked the White House.

When Agent Liberty wanted Haley to summon Supergirl so that the government agents could use their weapons on her, Haley hit the signal watch to summon her. Though Haley secretly hit it twice causing Supergirl not to show up. Haley later contacts Alex to let her know what the Claymore satellite is really being used for. After Lex is killed, Baker is impeached, and Agent Liberty is arrested, Haley is shown to have become the interim Secretary of Alien Affairs.

=== Kelly Olsen ===
Kelly Olsen (Azie Tesfai; main: seasons 5–6; recurring: season 4) is James Olsen's sister.

She became part of the main cast for the fifth season. After Jimmy leaves CatCo, Kelly goes to work for Obsidian Tech and helps with the development of the Obsidian Platinum lenses.

In season six, Kelly finds Andrea in sadness as her father blames her for what happened with the Unity Festival. Afterwards, Lena advises Alex to inform her on Supergirl's identity. Following the defeat of Lex Luthor and Nyxlygsptlnz, Alex and Kelly marry and adopt an alien girl, Esme.

=== Eve Teschmacher ===
Eve Teschmacher, portrayed by Andrea Brooks, is a thrall of Leviathan who tasked her with working as Lex Luthor's spy. Under the latter, she works undercover at CatCo as Cat Grant's, later James Olsen's, personal assistant and L-Corp as Lena Luthor's research assistant throughout the series. Following changes made to the multiverse during the events of "Crisis on Infinite Earths", Teschmacher becomes an employee of Leviathan's front company Obsidian Tech who joined the organization as an assassin after her father was killed. Lex later found her and persuaded her to work for him in exchange for protecting her mother and claiming to know who killed her father. Though she later discovers Lex was lying, he blackmails her into continuing to aid him by threatening to harm her mother. After Supergirl rescues Teschmacher's mother and Lex is arrested for his complicity with Leviathan, Teschmacher testifies against him, though he is later acquitted.

=== Mar Novu / Monitor ===
Mar Novu / The Monitor (LaMonica Garrett; main: season 5; guest: season 4) is a Multiversal being who tests different Earths in the multiverse in preparation for an impending "crisis", providing the Book of Destiny to John Deegan, releasing J'onn J'onzz's brother on Earth-38, and retrieving the corpse of Lex Luthor.

=== Andrea Rojas / Acrata ===
Andrea Rojas (Julie Gonzalo as an adult, Alexa Najera as a teen; seasons 5–6) is the CEO of Obsidian Tech, an old friend of Lena Luthor, a former girlfriend of Russell Rogers, and the new editor-in-chief of Catco Worldwide Media who Kara Danvers and James Olsen dislike. At a young age, Andrea's father Bernardo was having trouble at Obsidian Tech and she enlists Lena to help search the local ruins for the Acrata medallion. When Andrea finds it, she is approached by an elderly male representative of Leviathan who has her take the medallion so that Leviathan can use her services. When the elderly female representative Margot first appears to her, Andrea is told how to activate its abilities before she is sent to kill Governor Harper. Andrea persuades Margot to make use of Russell Rogers.

While running Cat Co., Andrea is being investigated by William Dey and his London Times colleagues, suspecting that she is head of an organized crime group. It is revealed that she has connections with Leviathan when Margot visited her stating that Rip Roar is in DEO custody. After the first attempt failed while also revealing to the viewers that she was the one who killed Caroline O'Connor, she turned to Lena for help. Lena provided a diversion for Supergirl so that Acrata could make off with Rip Roar. Acrata raids DEO HQ with the help of two Aurafacian-possessed humans. She is successful in this mission while the two Aurafacian-possessed humans were detained. After giving Lena the medallion, she witnesses Rip Roar getting sniped at the airport. The male elderly representative states that Leviathan still needs her services while Rip Roar has served his purpose. When Andrea states that Lena has the medallion, the male elderly representative states that her powers actually came from the darkness within her. Rama Khan later uses her in a plot to create a supervolcano in National City. This plot was thwarted by Supergirl and Martian Manhunter. Acrata teleports Rama Khan back to Leviathan's headquarters and flees.

Following the Crisis where Earth-Prime is formed, Andrea is talking about Obsidian Tech's lenses when Gamemnae appears in her Gemma Cooper alias. Andrea shows her the lenses as she makes some suggestions about them. During a test on Obsidian Platinum, it failed when Andrea found it simulating an allergy to lobster. Gemma later visits her and advises her to have Obsidian Tech collaborate with LuthorCorp to get past the errors. Andrea never became an assassin for Leviathan on Earth-Prime, though she still has the Acrata medallion which was seen after Supergirl thwarted Amy Sapphire's revenge on her for firing her virtual reality-addicted husband. When Alex got trapped in virtual reality, Andrea had to walk Kelly through getting Alex out. Afterwards, Andrea spoke to her employee Eve Teschmacher into looking into the bug patches. When Kelly and William visited Andrea about Eve, Andrea states that Eve had a clean slate. She also informs Kelly that if she approaches her without evidence of Obsidian's tampering, she will fire her. When Supergirl enters the Unity Festival, Lex advises Gemma to send one of their assassins to attack Supergirl's physical body. Gemma goes to Andrea and reveals that she is part of Leviathan and was the one who rescued her from the cave. She has an assignment for Andrea in exchange that nothing bad happens to Obsidian Tech and her father. Becoming Acrata, she tracks down Supergirl's body and prepares to use the Kryptonite on her. Acrata is talked down by Lena.

In season six, Kelly finds a saddened Andrea who states that her father has blamed her for what happened during the Unity Festival. Becoming Acrata, Andrea secretly visits Bernardo's home and buys her share of CatCo from him. Andrea announces this to the CatCo staff while also mentioning the news of Lex Luthor's arrest. When she as Acrata obtained Lex's journal about his love for Nyxlygsptlnz, she published it in William's name, which led to him being fatally shot by Lex in revenge. After speaking with Lena on if she was a monster, Acrata later assists the Super Friends in fighting Lex and Nyxlygsptlnz. Afterwards, Andrea establishes a journalism award and a foundation named after William. Cat Grant later bought back CatCo from her.

=== William Dey ===
William Dey (Staz Nair; seasons 5–6) is the new star reporter at Catco Worldwide Media. He secretly remains under the London Times newspapers' employ and undercover to investigates Andrea Rojas, suspecting that she is a criminal. When the lenses from Obsidian Tech came out, William only confronted a simulation of Andrea while covering up what he was using the lenses for to the real Andrea. William was later shocked when his old college friend Russell Rogers was turned into Rip Roar.

Following the Crisis where Earth-Prime is formed, a new William Dey attended the Man of Tomorrow event that the Luthor family was hosting. In a private talk with Kara, William claimed that Russell was killed when the Luthor family took over Russell's company. During his investigation, William arrived at a warehouse and was unable to find any proof of Lex's latest plot due to Margot Morrison using a cloaking wall to hide herself and those who got trapped in virtual reality. He was present when Supergirl and Martian Manhunter arrived at the location where they found that Lex had saved everyone there and killed Margot. William and Kelly later spoke to Andrea about Eve only to be told that Eve has a clean slate. William later secretly followed Eve only to end up black-bagged. Eve learns that William was investigating her connection to Lex. She shoots him before being subdued by Lena. Supergirl cauterizes the wound and has him taken to the hospital.

In season six, William is recuperating with his right arm in a sling at the time when Andrea mentions that she bought her share of CatCo from her father. He later tails the Superfriends to raise CatCo's readers. Then he enters an unspecified partnership with Otis Graves. Near the end of the season, Andrea breaks into Lex's mansion, steals his personal journals and publishes a revealing article on them under William's name to increase CatCo's viewership. This leads to William calling her out and dressing her down for her unethical actions and seeming care for no one but herself and her own interests. Later, William is fatally shot by Lex in the Superfriends HQ as revenge for the article, but manages to send a last video to Andrea regarding Lex's true nature before succumbing to his wounds. The Superfriends later hold a funeral for him and Andrea makes amends for his death by setting up a journalism award and a foundation in his honor.

=== Nyxly ===
Nyxlygsptlnz, nicknamed Nyxly (Peta Sergeant; season 6), is a 5th Dimension Imp whom Kara meets in the Phantom Zone. She saves her from Scar by claiming that the Phantoms and the White Martians are coming their way. While mentioning her history with Mister Mxyzptlk, Nyxly states that she was a princess who was banished to the Phantom Zone by her father King Brpxz who also killed her brother Bryxly. While having a bracelet that negates her abilities, Nyxly managed to sneak a 5th Dimensional Orb with her. To help Kara rescue Zor-El, Nyxly breaks her bracelets at the cost of her 5th Dimensional Orb. With her powers regained, Nyxly heals Kara's leg and helps to rescue Zor-El. When a mirror that would serve as one of the exits to the Phantom Zone is found, Kara discovered that Nyxly has her own plans with the mirror where she plans to go to Earth to return to the 5th Dimension and retaliate against her father. During the struggle, Kara accidentally sets off the self-destruct sequence and sacrifices the mirror to keep Nyxly from going through. Nyxly survived the building's explosion and secretly stows away on top of the Tower following Supergirl and Zor-El's rescue. After allowing Nia's mother to be revived for a day, Nyxly ran into the hunter Mitch and collaborated with him in a plot to trap Supergirl by having Dr. Desmond Raab build a cryo-bomb. When it was destroyed by Supergirl, it was revealed to have helped Nyxly regain her powers. Using her powers, Nyxly incapacitates Supergirl's legs in ice and destroys the Ormfell Building. With Supergirl vulnerable to magic, she calls for Mxyzptlk. Nyxly does different attacks to draw out Mxyzptlk until he surrenders to her. Nyxly then uses an orb to absorb Mxyzptlk where she uses the orb to find the totems she needs. After obtaining some of the Totems and being aided by an A.I. modeled after her that was placed in a Lexosuit she received, she is then visited by Lex Luthor who gave her the Lexosuit with the A.I. made from a future Nyxly. Lex aids her in hunting for the remaining totems. Though this becomes stained due to Lillian and their competition once the AllStone is put together and split into three pieces. When Lex Luthor opens a portal to the Phantom Zone to summon the Phantoms, Lex and Nyxly are dragged in by the Phantoms due to their hubris.

== Recurring characters ==
This is a list of recurring actors and the characters they portrayed in multiple episodes, which were significant roles. The characters are listed by the order in which they first appeared.

=== Introduced in season one ===
==== Zor-El ====
Zor-El (Robert Gant in season 1-2, Jason Behr in season 6) is Kara's biological father who sacrificed himself to see that Argo City was unharmed by Krypton's destruction.

In season six sometime after the Crisis, it was revealed that Zor-El survived the destruction of Krypton by sending himself into the Phantom Zone. He reunited with Kara and kept her safe from the Phantom Zone Phantoms as they work to find a way out of the Phantom Zone. When hitching a ride on a Phantom with Kara, Zor-El is kidnapped by Scar and his men where they plan to feed him to the creature in Shadow Lake. He is saved by Supergirl and Nyxly. When the Super Friends use a sun bomb to help save Supergirl, she flies Zor-El to the Tower as it leaves the Phantom Zone. When on Earth, he starts to develop his Kryptonian abilities and poses as Kara's uncle Archie from Midway City. Zor-El takes note of the garbage in the ocean and compares it with how Krypton's oceans were destroyed before Krypton's destruction. He modifies a Kelex from the Fortress of Solitude to help clean up the oceans by turning the garbage into energy that it can absorb. Something goes wrong and Zor-El helped to create a virus to shut it down before it can explode. Zor-El later states to Kara that it's time for him to reunite with Alura as Brainiac 5 prepares to take him to Argo City.

==== Eliza Danvers ====
Eliza Danvers (Helen Slater) is a scientist and Kara's foster mother, who is more protective of Kara than she is of her biological daughter Alex. She is the one to tell Kara and Alex about her husband working with the DEO to protect Kara and warns them about Hank as he is not to be trusted because of his involvement in Jeremiah's death. After the revelation that J'onn J'onzz has secretly taken over leadership of the DEO in Henshaw's place, Eliza occasionally offers her scientific expertise for the organization when needed.

In season five sometime after the Crisis, Eliza contacted Kara and Alex that Jeremiah has died. She later presided over his funeral.

In season six, Eliza helps out in the fight against the fight against Lex Luthor and Nyxlygsptlnz where she shot three owl manifestations that targeted Dreamer. Afterwards, she attended Alex and Kelly's wedding.

Slater previously portrayed Supergirl in the 1984 film and Lara-El in the television series Smallville.

==== Jeremiah Danvers ====
Jeremiah Danvers (Dean Cain; seasons 1–2) is a scientist, an old friend of Superman, and Alex's biological father and Kara's foster father, who offered his services to the DEO by working with Hank to protect Kara ever since she was given to him by Superman. Ten years earlier and under mysterious circumstances, he and Hank went to South America to capture J'onn J'onzz, with whom Jeremiah became friends after the alien saved him. When Hank caught up and saw them shake hands, he tried to kill J'onn, leading to a fight between Jeremiah and Hank while trying to keep Hank from killing J'onzz; Hank then stabbed Jeremiah, who later killed him in self-defense, collapsed on the ground, and was left for dead. He asked J'onzz to watch over his daughters. In the present, J'onn learns that Jeremiah not only survived the attack, but is also alive and being held at Project Cadmus.

In season two, Jeremiah is rescued and attempts to reintegrate into his family and the DEO, but eventually betrays them to Cadmus. It is revealed that he made an uneasy alliance with Lillian Luthor to protect Alex and Kara from her, and that he has been cybernetically enhanced like Hank Henshaw. He later turns against Cadmus.

In season five sometime after the Crisis, Eliza mentions to Kara and Alex that Jeremiah has died of cardiac arrest while helping aliens in South America. After some reluctancies, Alex was finally able to attend his funeral in Midvale. It was revealed that Lex Luthor tricked Eve Teschmacher into killing him by lying that Jeremiah was the Leviathan agent who killed her father. Lex retained footage of the murder to ensure Eve's loyalty to him and keep her from going to Supergirl for help.

Cain previously portrayed Superman in Lois & Clark: The New Adventures of Superman.

==== Vasquez ====
Vasquez (Briana Venskus; seasons 1–3) is a DEO agent who often works closely with Hank (J'onn), Alex, and Kara/Supergirl and is responsible for coordinating/relaying information on alien attacks or other incidents.

==== Alura Zor-El ====
Alura Zor-El (Laura Benanti in season 1-2, Erica Durance in season 3 and 5) is Kara's biological mother who is the twin sister of Astra In-Ze, a member of Argo City's High Council, and survived Krypton's explosion due to a failsafe around the city built by Zor-El. Her guidance (both in flashbacks, and as a holographic artificial intelligence) proves invaluable in Kara's journey. Alura was originally portrayed by Benanti, but later replaced by Durance due to prior commitments.

==== Astra In-Ze ====
Astra In-Ze (Laura Benanti) is the aunt of Kara and the twin sister of Alura, who is one of the main antagonists of season one's arc, alongside her husband Non. She plots to rule the Earth and targets Kara for revenge upon Alura, who sentenced her to imprisonment at Fort Rozz, though she claims that she wanted to save Krypton and Earth. Attempting to kill J'onn J'onzz in the episode "For the Girl Who Has Everything", Astra is killed by Alex; thus, Non, her husband, seeks revenge on Kara. It is later revealed that Astra and Non created Myriad, a mind control program that is designed for the purpose of saving the environment but can also be used to enslave people, and hence, is the main reason they are sentenced to Fort Rozz for life.

==== Maxwell Lord ====
Maxwell Lord (Peter Facinelli) is a tech mogul who is fascinated by Supergirl. Lord deduces that Supergirl has a secret identity and is determined to learn it at any cost, becoming her enemy in the process, eventually using Supergirl's connections to Alex and eavesdropping on the latter. After unleashing Bizarro on Supergirl, Maxwell is arrested by Alex and held by the DEO. The DEO eventually releases him, but warns him never to tell anyone the truth about Supergirl or the DEO; otherwise, they will release enough evidence of his crimes to send him to jail. Maxwell later helps Supergirl in stopping Non's attacks, but he later obtains a supply of Kryptonian power source Omegahedron from Sam Lane.

==== Kelex ====
The Kelex (voiced by an uncredited actor in early seasons, Mark Sussman in season 6) are a group of Kryptonian robots that work as assistants to the Kryptonians.

In season six, one Kelex at the Fortress of Solitude was modified by Zor-El to convert all the trash in the ocean into energy to absorb. Zor-El named it Oscar after a garbage can-dwelling creature. Something goes wrong causing it to merge with the garbage and turn into a giant junk monster. It had to take a virus to weaken it. After Brainiac 5 removed the Kelex, Supergirl disposed of the body by throwing it into the sun. Brainiac 5 then returned the Kelex to the Fortress of Solitude.

==== Barry Allen / Flash ====
Barry Allen / Flash (Grant Gustin; seasons 1–5) is a crime scene investigator from Central City on Earth-1 who becomes a superhero speedster after being hit by dark-matter infused lightning. Barry accidentally arrives in Supergirl's reality after crossing a dimensional barrier while testing a tachyon accelerator with S.T.A.R. Labs, befriends Kara and Winn, and reveals the existences of the multiverse and metahumans to the former and her allies. The Flash helps Supergirl battle against Livewire and the Silver Banshee in addition to offering her advice and support and providing means for Supergirl's Earth's inhabitants to combat their world's surfacing metahuman threats, and eventually returns to his world with Supergirl's help. In season two, Barry and his fellow heroes from his Earth recruit Kara to their universe to help fight against the Dominators, an armada of alien invaders who attack their world due to their fear of superpowered beings. The DEO eventually establishes an alliance with Earth-1's S.T.A.R. Labs after an encounter with the Music Meister. Kara and the DEO have since accessing S.T.A.R. Labs' technology and occasionally teams with Earth-1's heroes on missions. Gustin was the third Glee alum to appear on the show, after Benoist and Jenner, with Criss going on to be the fourth. Gustin reprises his role from The Flash.

==== Non ====
Non (portrayed by Chris Vance) is a former scientist in league with the House of El and a brutal Kryptonian military officer who is sinister, powerful, and angry – the antithesis of all things Supergirl stands for and becomes her greatest threat. Non is one of the main antagonists of season one's arc, along with his wife Astra In-Ze. He is Astra's husband – and hence Kara's uncle – and second-in-command. Non seeks revenge on Kara for Astra's death. However, despite his marriage to Astra, Non is not a faithful husband; he had an affair with Indigo at some point prior to being sentenced to the Phantom Zone.

==== Lucy Lane ====
Lucy Lane (portrayed by Jenna Dewan) is the younger sister of Lois Lane and James' ex-fiancée. In addition to her duties as trial counsel (prosecutor) for the Judge Advocate General's Corps, United States Army (where she held the rank of major), Lucy is a legal attaché on her father's staff, though she resigns her commission to remain in National City. She later accepts a job as general counsel for CatCo. In the same episode, it is mentioned that she graduated from the United States Military Academy and earned her J.D./M.B.A. from Harvard Law School. After breaking up with James again, Lucy leaves CatCo and returns to the military. She works with Colonel Jim Harper on the investigation into J'onn J'onzz. However, when Kara reveals to her that she is Supergirl, she helps rescue Hank and Alex, and is later named acting director of the DEO By the end of season one, Lucy officially becomes a co-director with J'onn J'onzz after he returns to the DEO

==== Leslie Willis / Livewire ====
Leslie Willis (portrayed by Brit Morgan; seasons 1–3) is an abrasive, and funny shock-jock who works for CatCo and becomes as dangerous and shocking as her words following an accident in which Supergirl rescues her from a potential helicopter crash during a lightning storm. The rescue backfires when Supergirl is struck by lightning while pulling Leslie out of the helicopter—electrocuting them both and giving Leslie electrical powers. She is captured and given over to the DEO. However, she is later broken out of prison by Siobhan Smythe/Silver Banshee, who wants to team up with her to retaliate against Cat. Along with her new partner, she is defeated by Supergirl again, this time with the help of The Flash and the citizens of National City, and is placed in police custody after The Flash adds new features to the National City Police Department on countering and imprisoning metahuman criminals. In season two, she is taken from prison in an attempt to harvest her power; she is saved by Supergirl, who allows her to escape under a temporary truce. She dies during a fight with Reign.

==== Sam Lane ====
Sam Lane (portrayed by Glenn Morshower) is a powerful military general and overprotective father to both Lucy and Lois whose arrival in National City stirs up trouble for Supergirl when he enlists her in a dangerous government initiative.

==== Kal-El / Clark Kent / Superman ====
Clark Kent / Superman (portrayed by an uncredited Kevin Caliber in season one, Tyler Hoechlin from season two onward) is a superhero from the planet Krypton (born Kal-El) who defends Metropolis. He was only shown briefly during season one having found Kara and gave her to his old friend Jeremiah Danvers to raise her. Superman only communicated via chat messaging. Daniel DiMaggio appears as an alternate, teenage version of the character in a dream sequence. Near the end of season one, Superman proves vulnerable to Myriad's mind control, as Maxwell Lord put it "watched Sesame Street and went to preschool; nurture over nature". This leaves him unconscious in the DEO until the last episode, where he wonders if the headache he is having is what a hangover is like.

He comes to National City at the beginning of season two to help Kara out in dealing with Project Cadmus and Metallo before leaving to return to Metropolis, vowing to return if Kara needs it. At the end of season two, Rhea uses silver Kryptonite to compel him to fight Kara, who is forced to knock him out. After he recovers from the Kryptonite, he helps Kara repel Rhea's invasion fleet.

In season four after meeting Barry Allen and Oliver Queen in the "Elseworlds" crossover event- during which he assists in destroying the rogue A.M.A.Z.O. robot and defeating Dr. John Deegan after Deegan tries to turn himself into a black-suited Superman to be a "hero" – Clark reveals that he and Lois are relocating to Argo City after learning that Lois is pregnant to ensure her safety during the pregnancy, Clark assuring Kara that he has faith that she can cope with her current challenges on Earth despite the rising anti-alien sentiment. Clark later proposes to Lois while on the way to Argo City. Lex later planned to use Claymore on Argo to destroy Superman only for Martian Manhunter and Dreamer to overload its core.

In season five, Superman and Lois Lane helped in the Crisis. When Earth-Prime is formed, Superman helped in the final battle against Anti-Monitor. In addition, he now has two children.

==== Siobhan Smythe / Silver Banshee ====
Siobhan Smythe (portrayed by Italia Ricci) is a new hire at CatCo Worldwide Media who clashes with Kara and later Supergirl. She briefly becomes Cat's top assistant, and has her sights set on becoming a media mogul in her own right. She has already attracted the attention of Winn, while discovering that her father had been involved in an affair upon learning he was a member of an Ashley Madison-esque website that is exposed by Indigo. When she sees a video of Supergirl (under the influence of Red Kryptonite) letting an alien escape, she tries to pitch it to Cat, and then tries to sell it to Cat's former employer, Daily Planet. When Cat finds this out, she fires Siobhan for her disloyalty. After another attempt to gain revenge on Kara fizzles, she discovers that she has the power to sonic scream. Upon learning that the women of her family are taken over by a banshee's spirit whenever they are wronged, Siobhan decides to retaliate against Cat and Kara by teaming up with Livewire; in the process, she embraces her curse for the powers it provides and becomes Silver Banshee. In addition to her hypersonic ability, the Silver Banshee's strength and endurance are on par with Supergirl's after her powers increased and is implied that she would have other abilities. Despite hating Kara, Siobhan chooses not to kill her, knowing that she would break her curse and lose her powers if she does until someone wronged her once more. Ironically, not knowing that Supergirl is Kara, and if the Silver Banshee kills the superhero, she would become a regular human again. She is later defeated by Supergirl and the Flash, along with Livewire, and both she and her partner are imprisoned in metahuman cells provided by the Flash.

==== Indigo ====
Indigo (portrayed by Laura Vandervoort) is a living computer, formerly known as Brainiac 8, sentenced to Fort Rozz for turning against the people of Krypton, but now unstoppable on Earth. It is revealed that she was the one who hijacked Kara's pod and connected both the pod and Fort Rozz that brought them to Earth, and also that she despises Astra. After Kara and Winn defeat her and she disintegrates, Non recreates Indigo to do his bidding. Indigo is permanently destroyed by J'onn J'onzz during Non's attempt to conquer Earth.

Vandervoort previously portrayed Supergirl in the series Smallville.

=== Introduced in season two ===
==== Lex Luthor ====
Lex Luthor (portrayed by Jon Cryer as an adult,; seasons 4–6; Aidan Fink as a boy; season 2) is Lillian's son and Lena's half-brother. He is the main antagonist in the series. Years ago, Lex created a red sky over Metropolis to take down Superman but was caught and sent to prison. In the present, it is revealed that Lex secretly watches and orchestrates a series of events including Ben Lockwood's leadership to Children of Liberty and Red Daughter's alignment with the rogue nation Kasnia. He is later freed from prison due to a disease. Lena decides to help Lex by working on a cure. Lena exposes Lex of cutting off the backup power which he agrees to he did and that he sent a thought-to-be-dead Otis to shoot James so that Lena would have no choice but to test the cure (a Harun-El serum) on him. It is also revealed that Eve was working with Lex and Otis. Lex puts Lena to sleep leaving Eve to look after her. Lex escapes with Otis, but is stopped by Supergirl. Lex later develops metahuman abilities similar to Kryptonians' in strength and invulnerability after his Harun-El injection. After teleporting to safety when his armor was destroyed by Supergirl on Shelly Island, Lex is hit with the Harun-El antidote and is met by Lena. Before dying of an open wound, Lex spitefully reveals to Lena that Kara is Supergirl and that Alex and those who worked with her kept the information from her. Lex's corpse is later retrieved by the Monitor.

In season five, Lex has been revived so he can help the Monitor avert an impending Crisis. Lex agrees, in exchange for the Monitor's help with a favor involving Lena. After helping to avert said Crisis and assisting in rebooting the multiverse, Lex regained control of LuthorCorp, became the head of the DEO (now a subsidiary of his company), as well as a hero in the eyes of most of the newly created Earth-Prime's people. The deal he made with the Monitor was that Lena would maintain her memories and be his Co-CEO. In addition, Lillian is now the head of the Luthor Foundation. To win Lena over, Lex used a truth-inducing organism on his arm. At a Man of Tomorrow event held by the Luthor family, William Dey privately talked to Kara voicing his suspicion that they did away with Russell Rogers when they bought out his company. Brainiac 5 later visited him about Leviathan as he shows him a picture of a possible doppelganger that resembles Winn. Lex Luthor visits Gamemnae in her alias of Gemma Cooper and persuades her to arrange a collaboration between LuthorCorp and Obsidian Tech. After Brainiac 5 becomes the new Director of the DEO following Alex's resignation, he gives Lex the information he needs from the alternate Toyman's A.I. hacking. Lex then tracks down Gemma Cooper and offers a partnership between LuthorCorp and Obsidian Tech. From day one of Earth-Prime, Lex had manipulated Eve Teschmacher into being his inside person in Leviathan where he had her orchestrate the events caused by Amy Sapphire and Richard Bates as well as tricking her into killing Jeremiah Danvers. While Supergirl was preventing a Sun-Eater released by a Morae on Leviathan's side from eating the Sun, Lex went to the scene of where those who were trapped in virtual reality were being held and freed them while killing Margot. Gamemnae confronted Lex about his actions and he states that she should focus her anger towards their mutual enemy Supergirl. Later that night, Lex revealed to Eve that the people he had protecting her mother will dispose of her should she go against him. He also has the footage of Eve killing Jeremiah which he advises her not be on the other side of Supergirl's eye beams. When Eve states that he is worse than Leviathan, Lex states that he is better than Leviathan. After a talk with his mother, Lex uses Lena's transportation watch to head to the Fortress of Solitude. Lex visited Lena at Stryker's Island where her Non Nocere project malfunctioned. After the incident was thwarted, Lex noted that her project would fail anyway causing Lena to see that Kara was right about him. After getting a call from Gamemnae that Rama Khan succeeded in his mission to obtain the Kryptonite from the DEO, Lex informs Brainy that they now have access to Leviathan's ship. When he enters the ship, Lex is given a special pin by Gemma to keep him safe from the ship's defenses. The two of them begin their plot involving the Unity Festival. When Supergirl enters it, Lex advises Gemma to send one of Leviathan's assassins after Supergirl's physical body to appease whoever she answers to. After Brainiac 5 enters the code that leads to him bottling Rama Khan, Tezumak, and Sela, Gemma briefly shuts down causing Lex to go after Brainiac 5. He finds a weakened Brainiac 5 on Leviathan's ship and claims the bottle containing Rama Khan, Tezumak, and Sela. After escaping, he gives the bottle to Lillian to begin their next plot.

In season six, Lex Luthor goes a head with his next phase of his plan by having Lillian copying the powers of the Leviathan members into him and beginning a broadcast that would harm those that do not have Obsidian Platinum lenses. During the fight at the Fortress of Solitude, Lex Luthor was hit by a fragment from Jarhanpur yet managed to use the Phantom Zone Projector to send Supergirl into the Phantom Zone. While incarcerated at National City Prison, Lex was visited by Lillian who stated that she told him so. Lena then arrives and uses the Myriad to erase their memories of Supergirl's identity from their minds. After being found not guilty due to him discrediting most of the witnesses for the prosecution, Lex and Lena fight for control of LuthorCorp. Owing to Lex having Otis sabotage the new children's wing at the hospital and noting that killing him won't change anything, Lena told Lex that she is leaving LuthorCorp. Lex Luthor later visited the future where he befriended and fell in love with a future Nyxlygsptlnz. She preserved the future Nyxly in A.I. form and placed it in a Lexosuit that he sent to the present Nyxly. After the Nyxly A.I. helped Nyxly obtain the Dream Totem, Lex appeared to her and assisted in obtaining the remaining Totems. Though this became strained due to Lillian. When Lex Luthor opens a portal to the Phantom Zone to summon some Phantoms to attack the Super Friends, they instead drag Lex and Nyxly into the Phantom Zone upon detecting his hubris.

Cryer previously portrayed Lex's nephew Lenny in Superman IV: The Quest for Peace.

==== Lillian Luthor ====
Lillian Luthor (Brenda Strong; seasons 2–6) is the leader of Project Cadmus, Lex Luthor's mother, and Lena Luthor's step-mother, and is the primary antagonist of season two's arc. She and her team were the ones responsible for turning John Corben and Hank Henshaw into Metallo and Cyborg Superman respectively. After Metallo had an encounter with Supergirl and Superman, Project Cadmus eventually reveals that it has gone rogue, and is waging war against all alien life on Earth. Lillian is arrested after a failed attempt to wipe out all aliens in National City with a Kryptonian bioweapon but is later freed by Metallo. Lillian is estranged from Lena since her husband favors her over their son, and blamed Lena's mother for the deterioration of her relationship with Lionel. During the Daxamite invasion, she briefly allies with Kara to rescue Mon-El and Lena from Rhea, and helps Lena and Winn prepare a weapon that will disperse lead in Earth's atmosphere to drive away the Daxamites. In season three episode, "For Good", Lillian later targets Morgan Edge after he poisoned Lena which leads to both of them being defeated by Supergirl and Jimmy Olsen and arrested by the authorities.

In season four, Lena has her mother placed on work release when it came to developing the antidote for the Harun-El. Lillian and Lena are later invited to the White House by Lex to watch the Claymore satellite destroy Argo.

In season five where the aftermath of the Crisis has created Earth-Prime, Lena finds that her mother is now the head of the Luthor Foundation. Lex later talks to Lillian about his plans involving Leviathan. After swiping the bottle containing Rama Khan, Tezumak, and Sela from a weakened Brainiac 5, Lex meets up with Lilian and gives her the bottle so that they can begin his next plot.

In season six, Lillian copied the abilities of the Leviathan operatives into Lex and claimed that his plan won't work. She and Otis later ambushed Alex and Dreamer during Lex's broadcast and fled when the satellites were destroyed. Lillian visited Lex in prison and gave him her "I told you so" comment. Lena then appears and uses Myriad to erase their memories of Supergirl's identity. During the final battle against Lex and Nyxly, Lillian is fatally wounded by Nyxly. Before dying in Lena's care, Lillian admitted that she knew about Lena's mother.

==== Snapper Carr ====
Snapper Carr (portrayed by Ian Gomez) is a newsman hired by Cat Grant to be the editor-in-chief of CatCo Magazine. A hard-nosed old-school newspaper reporter/editor, Carr is initially hostile to Kara when Cat assigns her to become a reporter under him, and also towards Olsen when James takes over Cat's job.

==== Olivia Marsdin ====
Olivia Marsdin (portrayed by Lynda Carter; seasons 2–4) was the President of the United States. It is revealed that she is a Durlan, after she signs a bill granting amnesty for aliens living incognito in the U.S., prior to which she survives two assassination attempts. A benevolent alien refugee who escaped her home planet Durla as a child after an invasion, Olivia seeks to protect both other refugees and people of America from alien attacks and other threats due to her experience, and therefore she hates invaders.

In season four, Mercy and Otis Graves publicly expose Olivia as an alien which causes her to resign. This enables Vice-president Baker to be sworn in as the new President of the United States.

Carter previously portrayed the eponymous character of the 1970s Wonder Woman television series.

==== M'gann M'orzz / Miss Martian ====
M'gann M'orzz (portrayed by Sharon Leal; seasons 2-3 & 5–6) is a guilt-ridden White Martian who disguises herself as a Green Martian, forsaking her race's heritage. She tends bar at an underground bar for aliens in National City. M'gann gradually earns J'onn J'onzz's trust and friendship after he discovers her true identity, and learns that she is benign and an outcast from her own people. When J'onn discovers this he places M'gann in a cell where she later has a physic attack. J'onn saves her by mentally connecting. In the next episode M'gann meets her former mate, and assists J'onn and the DEO in capturing him. Despite she and J'onn realizing they have romantic feelings for each other, M'gann chooses to return to Mars to search for other White Martians who are also against their race's savage legacy in hopes of ending it. M'gann later return to Earth in the season 2 finale with other benevolent White Martians to help J'onn repel the Daximite invasion. She reveals to J'onn that there is a secret party within the White Martians' society who seeks to overthrow tyranny. It is also when she and J'onn first kiss.

In season three episode three M'gann calls J'onn to Mars to help her and other White Martians save his father.

In season five after reconciling with Malefic, J'onn recommended that he'd hook up with M'gann to arrange for a peace treaty between the Green Martians and the White Martians. When a Morae on Leviathan's side releases a Sun-Eater from the Fortress of Solitude, M'gann shows up where she informs Supergirl and her allies about Malefic's technology detecting it. She then helps J'onn and Supergirl throw a capsule into the Sun-Eater's core to shrink it back to its harmless state. She even helped in the fight against Rama Khan at the DEO headquarters. M'gann later helps J'onn, Alex, and Dreamer in fighting Rama Khan, Tezumak, and Sela.

In season six, M'gann assisted in destroying the satellites used in Lex's broadcast and then assisted in the fight against Lex Luthor. When he was defeated, she and J'onn took Lex Luthor to the authorities. Then M'gann went to go look for someone who can help locate the area of the Phantom Zone where Supergirl was sent to. M'gann was later wounded by a Phantom as J'onn uses a piece of her soul he has in him to prevent her from changing into a Phantom. During the wedding of Alex and Kelly, Toyman hinted to J'onn that he and M'gann will have a son.

==== Lyra Strayd ====
Lyra Strayd (portrayed by Tamzin Merchant) is an alien from the planet Starhaven who takes a romantic interest in Winn.

==== Demos ====
Demos (portrayed by Curtis Lum) is a member of the DEO He later sacrifices his life in an attempt to prevent Selena's followers from getting Purity and Pestilence's corpses.

==== Rhea ====
Rhea (portrayed by Teri Hatcher) is the Queen of Daxam and Mon-El's mother. She and Lar Gand journey to Earth in search of Mon-El. She is utterly determined to take Mon-El back to Daxam with her. She tricks Lena Luthor into helping her build a transporter to bring a Daxamite fleet to conquer Earth. Rhea fights Kara in a one-on-one duel for the fate of Earth, but refuses to halt the invasion despite losing, and is killed when Kara activates a weapon that laces Earth's atmosphere with lead dust. Prior to her death, Mon-El reveals to his mother that he knows that she killed his father all along due to his awareness of her immorality. Thus, he will grieve over his father but not her.

Hatcher previously portrayed Lois Lane in Lois & Clark: The New Adventures of Superman and Ella Lane in Smallville.

==== Lar Gand ====
Lar Gand (portrayed by Kevin Sorbo) is the King of Daxam and Mon-El's father. He and Rhea journey to Earth in search of Mon-El. After he agrees to let his son remain on Earth, he is killed by Rhea, who views his decision as a betrayal. Despite Rhea lying to her son that Lar killed himself, Mon-El knows that his father was not suicidal and realizes that his mother murdered him.

=== Introduced in season three ===
==== Ruby Arias ====
Ruby Arias (portrayed by Emma Tremblay) is Samantha's daughter who is a smart, independently minded child fascinated by Supergirl.

In season four, it is revealed that Ruby and her mother relocated to Metropolis.

==== Morgan Edge ====
Morgan Edge (portrayed by Adrian Pasdar) is an amoral real estate developer who is at odds with Kara and Lena. Edge has led a successful restoration of National City following the Daxamite invasion. He also wants to tear down the city's waterfront slum and replace it with high rise buildings, and he secretly employs the tech-mercenary Bloodsport to destroy the area with a cloaked submarine. The attack is stopped by Supergirl, although there is no evidence proving Edge's involvement. Edge also tries to buy Catco out from under Cat Grant (who has become White House Press Secretary) to silence his critics. However, Lena Luthor buys the company before Edge does. Later on, a company of his poisons kids in swimming pools making the doctors think it is lead poisoning. Edge says it is a result of Lena's solution to annihilate the Daximites. After an attempt on Lena's life and killing his accomplice, Edge used a loophole, during his confrontation with Supergirl, stating that the man he killed had used him to frame Lena Luthor and she did National City a favour. Edge and Lena Luthor still have tension against each other. Lilian Luthor targets Edge for poisoning Lena. While Supergirl defeats Lilian (who was wearing a version of her son's Lexosuit in battle), Winn Schott Jr. and Jimmy Olsen defeat Morgan Edge, who is arrested alongside Lilian.

==== M'yrnn J'onzz ====
M'yrnn J'onzz (portrayed by Carl Lumbly) is J'onn J'onzz's father and another Green Martian survivor who is a pacifist religious leader on Mars. He comes to Earth to live with J'onn, and begins to suffer from a form of dementia which causes him to lose control of his mental powers. He dies and passes on his wisdom to J'onn. Following his death, M'yrnn occasionally appears in J'onn's visions to offer guidance and support.

Lumbly has previously voiced J'onn J'onzz in various animated works.

==== Thomas Coville ====
Thomas Coville (portrayed by Chad Lowe) is the leader of a religious group that worships Supergirl. Coville later had the religious group worship the Worldkillers. He is later killed by Selena after he served his purpose.

In season five, Mxyzptlk showed Kara a possible reality where Kara revealed her secret to Lena from the start. This resulted in Agent Liberty and Otis abducting Thomas and Lena to provoke Supergirl into revealing her true identity. Supergirl does so and rescues Thoms and Lena at the cost of the Children of Liberty targeting her loved ones.

==== Imra Ardeen / Saturn Girl ====
Imra Ardeen (portrayed by Amy Jackson) is a hero born on Saturn's moon Titan who has telekinetic abilities. She is Mon-El's wife and Kara's romantic rival.

==== Julia Freeman / Purity ====
Julia Freeman / Purity (portrayed by Krys Marshall) is a musician residing near National City who, like Reign and Pestilence, is a Worldkiller. She and Pestilence later take each other out in a mutual kill and have their powers absorbed by Reign.

==== Grace Parker / Pestilence ====
Grace Parker / Pestilence (portrayed by Angela Zhou) is a doctor in National City who, like Reign and Purty, is a Worldkiller. However, unlike them, Parker is sociopathic and embraces her Worldkiller alter-ego, therefore her personas accept each other as one. She and Purity later take each other out in a mutual kill and have their powers absorbed by Reign.

==== Selena ====
Selena (portrayed by Anjali Jay) is an evil Kryptonian priestess and one of the main antagonists of season three's arc, who originally appears as a holographic mentor to the Worldkillers and a member of the Worldkiller Coven. Her coven is responsible for creating Reign and other Worldkillers and she personally refers to her as her daughter, therefore revealing that Selena is Reign's biological mother. It is later revealed she survived Krypton's destruction and is a member of Argo City's High Council. Selena schemes to perform a ritual that will xenoform Earth into a Krypton-like planet upon studying the prophecy from the Book of Rao. Selena and her sisters come on Earth to resurrect Reign so they can xenoform Earth, but they were stopped after killing Reign from Supergirl and Samantha Arias and were taken to Argo City for trial.

In season five, a doppelganger of Selena and her followers appeared in Al's Bar alongside their Brainiac 5. To free their bottled Earth, the evil Brainiac 5 and Selena worked to free it not knowing that it would destroy the planet. This plan was thwarted by Supergirl, Dreamer, and Brainiac 5 enabling the doppelgangers to return to their bottled Earth.

In seasons six, a hologram of Selena helped out the Super Friends when looking for one of the Totems. She also figured out that Lena's mother was a witch.

=== Introduced in season four ===
==== Al Crane ====
Al Crane (portrayed by Keith Dallas) is the owner of Al's Dive Bar.

In season five, Al's Dive Bar is affected when inhabitants from a bottled Earth start appearing their including Al's counterpart. The doppelgangers were returned to their Earth. Al later enlisted Alex and J'onn to find his brother Trevor who has not returned from the hotel where he was doing Obsidian Tech's virtual experience in Virtual Vegas.

In season six, Al allows Kelly to hold a bachelorette party for her and Alex. Following the defeat of Lex Luthor and Nyxlygsptlnz, he was later present at their wedding.

==== Mercy Graves ====
Mercy Graves (portrayed by Rhona Mitra) is a former Project Cadmus agent alongside her brother Otis Graves. Similar to her Superman: The Animated Series counterpart, Mercy was also head of security for what was then known as Luthor-Corp under Lex Luthor's reign; she resigned from her post due to her boss's obsession with Superman, feeling he wasn't seeing the bigger picture. When Lillian Luthor was arrested, she and Otis began working with Agent Liberty and the Children of Liberty. Both of them were seemingly killed by a Hellgrammite. While Mercy remains dead, Otis reappears in the employ of Lex Luthor.

==== Otis Graves ====
Otis Graves (portrayed by Robert Baker) is the brother of Mercy Graves who is loosely based on Otis from the 1978 film. Unlike his more professional sister, Otis has a more childish, sadistic streak as demonstrated when he tortures Dr. Rohan Vose for fun, to Mercy's disapproval. When Lillian Luthor is arrested, he and Mercy begin working with Agent Liberty and the Children of Liberty. Both of them are killed by a Hellgrammite.

Otis turns up alive, having been resurrected by Eve Teschmacher. When Supergirl and Lena Luthor find information in Lex Luthor's cell, Otis is told to go into a location and stand there as Otis explodes. Lex then has Otis put back together. Ben later visits Otis where he unknowingly tells him of Lex Luthor's plot to look like he reformed. This causes Ben to kill Otis.

In season five, Mxyzptlk shows Kara a possible reality where she reveals her identity to Lena from the start. This leads to Otis and Agent Liberty abducting Lena Luthor and Thomas Coville to coerce Supergirl into revealing her identity.

In season six, sometime after the Crisis, Otis turns up alive and is seen assisting Lillian in attacking Alex and Brainiac 5. When Lex Luthor's broadcast was thwarted upon the satellites being destroyed, Otis and Lillian got away. Lex later sent Otis to sabotage the new wing at the children's hospital that Lena established. He even orchestrated Otis to meet with William Dey.

==== Reiff ====
Reiff (portrayed by Donna Benedicto) is a DEO agent.

==== Raymond Jensen / Parasite ====
Raymond Jensen (portrayed by Anthony Konechny) is a DEO agent that sided with the Children of Liberty. Following the deaths of Mercy and Otis, Agent Liberty subjected Jensen to an experiment that involved placing an Angon alien parasite inside him. When he absorbs the lifeforce of anyone, they become withered. In the case of aliens, he can absorb their abilities.

==== Mackenzie ====
Mackenzie (portrayed by Jaymee Mak) is a reporter for CatCo Worldwide Media.

==== Phillip Baker ====
Phillip "Phil" Baker (portrayed by Bruce Boxleitner) started out as the Vice President of the United States under president Olivia Marsdin. After Marsdin resigns upon the Children of Liberty exposing her as a Durlan, Baker is sworn in as the new president of the United States. He later appointed Lauren Haley to oversee the DEO. Unlike Olivia, Baker is a selfish man who cares more about his approval ratings than the welfare of his country and morality, although he nonetheless opposes the Children of Liberty.

Following the arrests of Agent Liberty and Manchester Black, Baker appeared at DEO headquarters after seeing the news. He ordered Supergirl to reveal her secret identity to regain the trust of a divided and improve his standing, but she refused since it would endanger her loved ones. Baker has Supergirl dismissed from the DEO's services, hoping she will come around. Baker later makes an example of Menagerie and has her incarcerated. He also pardons Ben Lockwood of his crimes on a technicality to improve his poll ratings, putting him at odds with the DEO.

Baker creates a missile launch contingency towards any spaceship that approaches Earth behind the DEO's back despite Supergirl's objections. Following her fight with the Elite, she confronts Baker about the satellite that nearly crashed, which Supergirl was forced to destroy to save everyone. In retaliation, Baker invites Lockwood to the White House and makes him the Director of Alien Affairs. In light of the alien peace march, Baker and Lockwood are left to hold inquiries about the Alien Amnesty Act's fate. When Baker repeals the bill, Red Daughter disguised as Supergirl attacks the White House. Baker promptly declares Supergirl public enemy #1, making it clear he no longer considers aliens citizens. Baker eventually deputizes the Children of Liberty, giving Lockwood free rein to round up every alien in the country.

At some point, Baker installed Kryptonite in his office to protect against further attacks from Red Daughter and Supergirl. Kara Danvers later meets with Baker to present evidence that Lex Luthor is conspiring with Kaznia to attack the US. After confirming that no one else knows of her discovery, Baker takes the evidence and has Kara black-bagged. He is then revealed to have been working with Lex Luthor the whole time in exchange for the presidency. After Lex "kills" Red Daughter on TV, Baker claims that Lex has killed Supergirl, who was the mastermind of the Kaznian attack.

After Kara writes an exposé unveiling Lex's crimes following the battle at Shelly Island, Baker is impeached by Congress, removed from office, and arrested for his colluding with Lex. Vice-president Plastino is sworn in as the acting president until re-elections can be held again, with his first act being the reinstatement of the Alien Amnesty Act.

Brent Spiner was originally cast as Baker, but had to step down due to a family emergency. As a result of this, the role was recast to Bruce Boxleitner.

==== Lydia Lockwood ====
Lydia Lockwood (portrayed by Sarah Smyth) is married to Ben Lockwood and mother of George Lockwood. Initially opposed to overt prejudice against extraterrestrials, she comes to agree with her husband's anti-alien rhetoric after her father-in-law Peter Lockwood's death. Lydia later learns Ben is "Agent Liberty" following an attack by Manchester Black and becomes a supporter of his, even encouraging George to follow in his father's footsteps. She is killed in the episode "American Dreamer" when an alien invades Ben's home in reprisal for his active participation in alien detentions.

==== George Lockwood ====
George Lockwood (portrayed by Graham Verchere) is the son of Ben and Lydia Lockwood. As a teenager living through chaotic circumstances, George was the first to begin parroting his grandfather's xenophobic rhetoric, which worsens with his father's indoctrination. He briefly leads the Children of Liberty as a figurehead while his father is in custody, helping with the initial defeat of Menagerie, before Ben is pardoned and retakes command. After finding out that one of his friends is an alien and witnessing firsthand the Children of Liberty harming innocent alien families, George starts to reconsider helping his father. After Lydia's murder, George realizes his father's hatred of aliens has consumed him and lead to his mother's death, causing their relationship to be strained. Following the arrest of Agent Liberty, George sets out to undo his father's work and appears on TV, asking for humans and aliens to cooperate with each other and fight against people like the Children of Liberty who tried to keep them apart.

==== Manchester Black ====
Manchester Black (portrayed by David Ajala) is a man who fell in love with an Empath from Ikthanol named Fiona Byrne. After she was captured by the Children of Liberty, Manchester worked with Martian Manhunter to find her. When they find a badly-wounded Fiona in Mercy and Otis's van, Manchester had his final moments with a dying Fiona as Martian Manhunter tries to heal her. Following Fiona's death, Manchester went to buy guns for revenge on those responsible for Fiona's death. After a shootout with some Children of Liberty members, Manchester tortures and later kills a surviving member on the identity of his superior. Manchester proceeded to target Caldwell where he massacred him and the Children of Liberty members with him after getting the information about Ben Lockwood. After holding Lydia Lockwood hostage, Manchester faced off against Ben Lockwood until they were stopped by Supergirl and Nia Nal. Afterward, Manchester and Ben were arrested by the police. He was briefly visited by Martian Manhunter in National City Men's Central Jail before witnessing Ben Lockwood being incarcerated.

Manchester Black later escapes from prison and forms the Elite with Menagerie, Hat, and an unnamed Morae in his plans to retaliate against Ben Lockwood and the Children of Liberty.

Supergirl and Martian Manhunter continue investigating Manchester who confronts the two by using a staff that triggers J'onn's memories to come back. Just before Lena Luthor and Kelly Olsen can use the cure on Jimmy Olsen so that they can see if it can work on a dying Lex Luthor, Manchester causes a power outage across the city. Supergirl and Martian Manhunter confront Manchester again. Martian Manhunter kills Manchester while Kara stops the city from being flooded.

==== Sarah Walker ====
Sarah Walker (portrayed by Françoise Robertson) is the White House Chief of Staff under President Phil Baker.

==== Margot Morrison ====
Margot Morrison (portrayed by Patti Allan) is an elderly member of Leviathan who works in their middle-management division and has interacted with Eve Teschmacher and Andrea Rojas.

Margo started collecting the bodies of those who got trapped in virtual reality. While Supergirl was busy dealing with the Sun-Eater that was released by a Morae on Leviathan's side, Lex Luthor went into the building where the bodies were held and killed Margot. The press learned of Lex's heroic action, though Gamemnae was not pleased with what happened to Margot.

==== Malefic J'onzz ====
Malefic J'onzz (portrayed by Phil LaMarr as an adult, Marcello Guedes as a boy, Domonique Robinson as a teenager) is a Green Martian, the son of M'yrnn J'onzz, and the brother of J'onn J'onzz. He was born with the ability to incept thoughts into other minds, leading M'yrnn to place him in solitary confinement to protect others from him. Malefic was brought to Earth from the Phantom Zone by the Monitor and plots vengeance on J'onn.

He starts by freeing Midnight from the Phantom Zone. With help from Obsidian Tech, J'onn figures out that Malefic betrayed the Green Martians to the White Martians and used a death curse on some of them which led to Malefic being banished to the Phantom Zone. J'onn then wiped Malefic's existence from the collective memory of the Green Martians to spare M'yrnn the pain of his failure with Malefic,. Lena later does an experiment on Malefic enabling him to assume a human form more close to his father and brother. Taking the advice of M'yrnn, J'onn confronts Malefic. After a brief mind-meld, the brothers reconcile. Malefic helps the DEO prevent Lena from using Myriad at the time when Supergirl and J'onn were fighting Rama Khan. Once that was done, J'onn provides Malefic with one of his cars so that Malefic can return to Mars and work with Miss Martian to end the war between the Green Martians and the White Martians. Malefic being released from the Phantom Zone was all part of a test by the Monitor which J'onn passed. The technology used by Malefic later detected a Sun-Eater heading to the Sun as Miss Martian arrives to help deal with the Sun-Eater.

In season six, J'onn mentioned that he visited Malefic on if he can help locate the area of the Phantom Zone where Lex Luthor sent Supergirl. J'onn mentioned to Alex that he can only remember where Midnight was.

=== Introduced in season five ===
==== Gamemnae ====
Gamemnae (portrayed by Cara Buono) is a high-ranking Leviathan member with technokinesis, electrokinesis, and the ability to assume a metallic form who came to Earth from Krypton's sister planet Jarhanpur during the age of the dinosaurs. She is the main antagonist of the season five's arc. She takes charge of Leviathan's operations following Rama Khan's numerous failures where the Anointed One has ordered her to reassign Rama Khan's position to Tezumak. Following the Crisis where Earth-Prime was formed, Gamemnae visited Andrea at Obsidian Tech posing as board of directors member Gemma Cooper. Upon trying the virtual reality lenses, she does make some ideas on how Andrea can improve them. Lex Luthor tracked her down and persuaded her to allow LuthorCorp to help improve the upcoming Obsidian Platinum project. Won over by Lex's advice, Gemma instructs Andrea to have Obsidian Tech collaborate with LuthorCorp. Gemma later has Margot inform the Anointed One that LuthorCorp is in their clutches just as planned. Lex later visits her during the time when Andrea was being targeted and advises that her people stay out of this. After the threat was stopped, Lex states to Gemma that he would like to meet her people. Gamemnae later confronted Lex about his killing of Margot. Lex states that she should focus her anger on their common enemy Supergirl. Gamemnae later gives Rama Khan a second chance by obtaining a specific item while advising him not to fail. Gamemnae as Gemma later contacts Lex to let him know that Rama Khan obtained the Kryptonite that was in the DEO's possession and arranges for Lex to meet her people. When Lex is brought upon their ship, Gamemnae gives him a pin to protect him from the ship's defenses. The two of them begin their Unity Festival where she sends Rama Khan, Tezumak, and Sela to draw out Supergirl. When Supergirl enters the virtual reality, Lex finds her signature in the system and advises Gamemnae to send one of her assassins to take out Supergir's physical body. This causes Gamemnae to reveal her nature to Andrea Rojas as the person who rescued her from the cave and advises her to take out Supergirl to avoid her company collapsing and disappointing her father. After Brainiac 5 enters the code that leads to him bottling Rama Khan, Tezumak, and Sela, Lex finds Gamemnae shutting down as a side effect. She later comes back on while shedding her human disguise.

In season six, Gamemnae's cybernetic form returns to her base and fights Supergirl and her allies while Dreamer rescues Brainiac 5. They were able to destroy Gamemnae by uploading the Anti-Life Equation into the nearest console.

==== Rama Khan ====
Rama Khan (portrayed by Mitch Pileggi) is a high-ranking Leviathan member with geokinesis who comes to Earth from Krypton's sister planet, Jarhanpur, during the age of the dinosaurs. He was also responsible for the great flood that resulted in the construction of Noah's Ark, the destruction of Pompeii, the Antioch earthquake, the Yellow River flood, and the Bhola cyclone. After leading Leviathan's forces against Supergirl and failing them in a supervolcano-formation plot that involved Acrata's lifeforce, Gamemnae states that she is taking over the operations and reassigning his position to Tezumak. Rama Khan states that this is not over. Sometime after Earth-Prime was formed, Rama Khan was shown in Leviathan's headquarters under house arrest. Gamemnae frees him in exchange that he obtains a specific item while advising him not to fail. Rama Khan causes an earthquake in Oregon until he is defeated by Supergirl, Dreamer, Martian Manhunter, and Miss Martiah as Brainy shows up with the DEO to detain Rama Khan. While being interrogated, Rama Khan and Brainy exchanged Jarhanpurian language before Rama Khan broke free causing the entire building to be evacuated. As he started to bring down the entire building, Rama Khan was able to make off with the Kryptonite in the DEO's possession and give it to Gamemnae. He later fights Martian Manhunter, Miss Martian, Alex, and Dreamer alongside Tezumak and Sela. When Brainiac 5 enters a code into the Leviathan ship, the three of them are teleported to the ship and are bottled by Brainiac 5.

=== Introduced in season six ===
==== Mitch ====
Mitch (portrayed by Matt Baram) is Naxim Tork's assistant who is also from Tork's race. He assisted Tork in looking for aliens to add to Tork's menagerie. Years later, Mitch and Tork were freed by Lex Luthor prior to the DEO headquarters' destruction. After he and Tork went their separate ways, Mitch started using an image inducer to make himself look more human. After capturing Nyxly, Mitch was persuaded by her to help capture Supergirl so that he can restart Tork's menagerie and rejoin him. This leads to them abducting Dr. Desmond Raab who makes a cryo-bomb. Mitch was apprehended by Martian Manhunter and Brainiac 5. After escaping, Mitch unsuccessfully sought Nyxly's help to restart his menagerie. After Nyxly was rescued by Mitch at the last minute following her absorbing Myxzptlk into a crystal, she caved in to Mitch's offer and states that she will grant him his wish if he can help her find the Totem of Courage. After being saved from his self-destructing ship at the last minute, Mitch later sided with the Super Friends duering the final battle against Lex and Nyxly.

==== Esme Danvers-Olsen ====
Esme (portrayed by Mila Jones) is a Dryalian girl in Ms. Hochschild's foster home who can copy the abilities of any alien. Following the arrest of Ms. Hochschild, Esme told Kelly about her figuring out that she leaked the footage of Ms. Hochschild's poor treatment of Joey and won't tell anybody that it was her. Alex and Kelly later adopt her and work to help her master her abilities and become a family. Briefly becoming the host of the Totem of Love, Esme was abducted by Lex and Nyxlygsptlnz to get a trade for the remaining Totems from the Super Friends. The AllStone was formed where Esme unknowingly shatters it during the conflict. Following Lex and Nyxly's defeat, Esme was the flower girl at Alex and Kelly's wedding.

==== Orlando Davis ====
Orlando Davis (portrayed by Jhaleil Swaby) is a Zeltarian who was incarcerated for petty store robbery when trying to get himself and his brother Joey through hard life. He alongside an unnamed Metalomite, an unnamed Toradine, an unnamed Obscuran, and an unnamed Dynamorph were used by Warden Kote to partake in Intergang's illegal activities that were being covered up as a work release program. Supergirl convinced Orlando and the other prisoners to surrender. He and the other prisoners had their sentence commuted by a judge. Orlando later becomes a councilman and assists the Super Friends in their fight against Lex Luthor and Nyxlygsptlnz.

== Guest stars ==
The following is a supplementary list of guest stars, some recurring, who appear in lesser roles. The characters are listed in the order in which they first appeared.

=== Introduced in season one ===
- The Commander (Faran Tahir) – An alien military expert who leads the forces aligned against Supergirl.
- Vartox (Owain Yeoman) – An alien convict who has been hiding on Earth for the past twelve years and seeks a battle with Supergirl after she emerges, using the attempted plane crash that Kara aborted to draw her out. He commits suicide after Kara defeats him in their rematch before he could destroy National City.
- Hellgrammite (Justice Leak) – An unnamed alien escapee from Fort Rozz who feeds on DDT and is from the same alien race of the same name. Later, Alex kills him. Another Hellgrammite appears in season 4 as an alien controlled by the Children of Liberty who is made to attack a carnival. He is defeated by Supergirl, Alex, and Guardian who free him from his possession. After killing Mercy and Otis Graves as payback and for their anti-alien plans, Hellgrammite surrenders peacefully.
- Ben Krull / Reactron (Chris Browning) – A former nuclear physicist and an enemy of Superman who seeks revenge on him by trying to kill Supergirl in retaliation for his wife's death.
- Carter Grant (Levi Miller) – Cat Grant's sensitive and shy son who has a crush on Supergirl, which he confesses to Kara when she babysits him.
- T. O. Morrow (Iddo Goldberg) – A brilliant scientist. Morrow later reprograms Red Tornado to kill Kryptonians and both are defeated by Alex and Kara, respectively.
- Red Tornado (voiced and motion-captured by Iddo Goldberg) – An android designed as the ultimate super-weapon that gains sentience. In season six, Lex Luthor and Nyxlygsptlnz use their AllStones to summon a manifestation of Red Tornado.
- Katherine Grant (Joan Juliet Buck) – Cat Grant's mother, whom Cat has despised due to her failure to recognize her daughter's success. Even Kara can barely stand to be in Katherine's presence for too long.
- Jemm (Charles Halford) – An alien prisoner who uses the gemstone embedded in his forehead to manipulate people's emotions and behavior. He is a conqueror of 12 planets, for which he was also convicted.
- Bizarro (Hope Lauren) – A mirror image of Supergirl, loosely based on the Bizarro Superman. Lord creates her by infusing a comatose Jane Doe with Kara's DNA and black blood cells, and orders her to destroy Supergirl after learning the latter's true identity. With the exception of fire breath and freeze vision, her powers are identical to those of Supergirl. She is defeated by Kara after the DEO injects her with blue kryptonite and placed back in a comatose state at the DEO headquarters. Regular kryptonite will only strengthen Bizzaro.
- Winslow Schott Sr. / Toyman (Henry Czerny) – A mad criminal genius and Winn's estranged father who weaponizes toys to wreak destruction, as he seeks revenge on his former boss for stealing his ideas, which led Winslow to send a bomb to his workplace at the cost of six lives, excluding his boss, who survived because his secretary opened the package by accident. He wants nothing more than to repair the bond between himself and Winn, but is seen as insane and unlikeable by his own son. Toyman later dies in prison and is succeeded by Jacqueline Nimball. Winn later encounters the digital conscious of his father who begs to his son to let him help. Winn reluctantly allows him to help as Toyman fights the alternate Winn. Once Winn enters the code to stop the hacking, both Toyman's conscious and the alternate Winn's conscious are deleted.
- Cameron Chase (Emma Caulfield) – An FBI agent.
- Adam Foster (Blake Jenner) – Cat Grant's eldest son and Carter's half-brother. He serves as Kara's potential love interest and thus another rival for James and Winn. Jenner was the second Glee alum to appear on the show, after Benoist, his then-wife. Gustin and Criss would later be the third and fourth, respectively.
- Miranda Crane (Tawny Cypress) – A senator who uses her anti-alien beliefs to gain votes, but is forced to turn to Supergirl for help when her visit to National City is interrupted by an alien attack. She is kidnapped by a White Martian, who poses as Crane to kill Martian Manhunter until Supergirl helps the latter avert it before it goes further. The real Crane apologizes and vows to help make peace with humans and aliens.
- Detective Draper / Master Jailer (Jeff Branson) – A third-generation guard at Fort Rozz who becomes a vigilante after learning that many of its inmates were loose on Earth. He is bent on chasing down the escapees and bringing them to justice, believing that he is judge, jury, and executioner on Earth, even if the criminals were convicted of lighter crimes. He poses as a National City detective to obtain information on the escapees' whereabouts.
- Laura (Kitana Turnbull) - A girl who made her own homemade Supergirl costume, though some children picked on her for it until Supergirl praised her. When Supergirl's personality was affected by Red Kryptonite, Laura tragically discarded her Supergirl costume.
- James Harper (Eddie McClintock) – A colonel for the United States Marine Corps who leads the investigation of Hank Henshaw / J'onn J'onzz's affair alongside Lucy Lane.
- Maxima (Eve Torres) – Another alien prisoner who is the queen of the planet Almerac and once attempted to make Superman her mate. She attempts to escape with the help of the DEO agents including Lucy Lane (under the influence of Myriad) before Kara manages to stop her.

The hosts of The Talk, Sara Gilbert, Julie Chen, Sharon Osbourne, Aisha Tyler, and Sheryl Underwood, cameo as themselves.

=== Introduced in season two ===
- John Corben / Metallo (Frederick Schmidt) – An international assassin who is transformed into a cyborg by Project Cadmus after he is badly injured trying to kill Lena Luthor. He is later killed after the Kryptonite that was infused into his body turned him into a living bomb. In season six, Lex Luthor and Nyxlygsptlnz summon a manifestation of Metallo to fight the Super Friends.
  - Schmidt also voiced Metallo's Earth-X counterpart in "Crisis on Earth-X". A member of the New Reichsmen, Metallo-X was assigned to subdue Supergirl for Dark Arrow and Overgirl. He is later destroyed by the combined effort of Earth-1 and Earth-X's heroes.
- Gilcrist / Metallo II (Rich Ting) – A doctor working at Cadmus who became a second Metallo and ordered to work alongside Corben.
- Scorcher (Nadine Crocker) – A pyrokinetic Infernian who attempts to assassinate President Marsdin.
- Veronica Sinclair / Roulette (Dichen Lachman) – The operator of an underground alien fight club in National City who later becomes a human trafficker for an alien slave trade.
- Draaga (John DeSantis in season 2, Glenn Ennis in season 3) – An alien combatant in Roulette's underground fight club. After defeating Supergirl in their first encounter, she defeated him in turn during their second encounter after the Kryptonian learned of his weak spot.
- Rudy Jones / Parasite (William Mapother) – A scientist working on solving climate change who was fused with an alien parasite, giving him the ability to absorb powers or a person's life. Jones began killing senators who were stopping attempts at researching climate change while he slowly mutated into a purple creature after absorbing J'onn and Kara's powers. Jones is eventually killed when the latter forces him to absorb a radioactive isotope. In season six, Lex Luthor and Nyxlygsptlnz summon a manifestation of Parasite to fight the Super Friends.
- Phillip Karnowsky / Barrage (Victor Zinck Jr.) – A former Navy SEAL who eventually became a vengeful vigilante after his wife is murdered.
- Cisco Ramon / Vibe (Carlos Valdes) – A member of the Flash's team at S.T.A.R. Labs from Earth-1 as well as a metahuman with the ability to detect anomalies within reality, emit concussive soundwaves, and open breaches between worlds. Cisco is also a genius inventor who made an extrapolator for interdimensional communication and travel for Kara. Valdes reprises his role from The Flash.
- Izzy Williams (Harley Quinn Smith) – A young woman who was kidnapped and transported to the planet Maladoria by Veronica Sinclair as part of a smuggling ring.
- Lionel Luthor (Ian Butcher) – Lillian Luthor's estranged husband as well as Lex and Lena's father who was the previous CEO of LuthorCorp. He died at some point.
- Mister Mxyzptlk (Peter Gadiot in season 2, Thomas Lennon in season 5 and 6) – An impish, reality-bending trickster from the 5th Dimension. He attempts to force Kara to marry him, but is banished to the 5th Dimension when she tricks him into spelling his name backwards. Mxyzptlk later visits Kara and Alex at their apartment following Alex's resignation from the DEO Wanting to atone to his past transgressions toward Kara with his previous appearance being a form he took, he shows Kara possible realities where Supergirl revealed her identity to Lena at different points which always ended bad in some way. When it came to a possible reality where Supergirl and Lena never met, it had Lena taking over the remaining half of National City following an attempt on her life caused by Lex and harnessing the energies of the 5th Dimension to power her Hope-Bots which explained why Mxyzptlk was unable to use his powers. It was also mentioned that Hat was an old drinking buddy of his who took his hat. Once Mxyzptlk was able to draw on the 5th Dimension, he undid the reality. In season six, Mxzyptlk was called by Supergirl when the Ormfell Building was destroyed by Nyxly. Mxzyptlk told the Super Friends about Nyxly's history. He later surrendered to Nyxly who absorbed him into a globe to help find the Totems. Lex Luthor later broke the globe which freed Mxy. Following Lex and Nyxly's defeat, Winn mentioned to Kara and J'onn that Mxy will owe Alex and Kelly a wish.
- Mandrax (Paul Lazenby) – An alien art smuggler imprisoned at Fort Rozz.
- Music Meister (Darren Criss) – An extra-dimensional being with the ability to hypnotize people, sending them into a self-created dream world which allows him to siphon their abilities. Criss was the fourth Glee alum to appear on the show, after Benoist, Jenner, and Gustin.
- Jack Spheer (Rahul Kohli) – The CEO of Spheerical and Lena's ex-boyfriend who created a nanotechnogical medical solution called Biomax.
- Marcus (Lonnie Chavis) – A young alien who bonds with James Olsen.
- General Zod (Mark Gibbon) – Superman's most feared enemy. He appears only in Superman's silver kryptonite-induced hallucinations. Though it was mentioned that Superman killed him, he was somehow revived in the 30th Century.

=== Introduced in season three ===
- Gayle Marsh / Psi (portrayed by Yael Grobglas) – A metahuman psychic who uses people's minds against them.
- Oscar Rodas (portrayed by Carlos Bernard) – Maggie Sawyer's estranged father and a police officer.
- Kenny Li (portrayed by Ivan Mok in season three, Peter Sudarso in season six) - A friend of Kara and Alex Danvers. He was killed upon stumbling upon Sheriff Collins' illegal drug dealing activities. In season six sometime after the Crisis, Kenny was not killed and become Kara's boyfriend in high school.
- Ronald Collins (portrayed by David Chisum) - A corrupt sheriff of Midvale who was behind the illegal drug deal activities. He killed Kenny Li when he stumbled upon it. Collins was defeated by Kara and was arrested. 11 years later, Collins was released on parole and moved to National City where he became a suspect in the attack on Alex and Ruby Arias. He had no involvement in the attack when he expressed remorse for what he did to Kenny. In season six sometime after the Crisis, Collins did not kill Kenny.
- Patricia Arias (portrayed by Betty Buckley) – Samantha Arias' adoptive mother, who is estranged from her daughter after she became pregnant with Ruby as a teenager. She was later stabbed by Reign and died from her injuries in DEO custody.
- Olivia (portrayed by Sofia Vassilieva) – A woman who became a member of Thomas Coville's Cult of Rao. She later came across a Kryptonian artifact that when in her hands would make her a Worldkiller. When it is unable to be removed from Olivia, Supergirl used her heat vision to warm it enough for it to come out of her hand and then used her freezing breath to cool Olivia's hand.
- Oliver Queen / Green Arrow (portrayed by Stephen Amell) – A former billionaire playboy turned mayor of Star City from Earth-1 who operates as hooded-bow wielding vigilante, Green Arrow. He is a close friend and ally of the Flash who befriends Kara. Amell reprises his role from Arrow.
  - Oliver Queen / Dark Arrow (portrayed by Stephen Amell) – Oliver's Earth-X counterpart, leader of Earth-X's Nazi regime, and Overgirl's husband.
  - Amell also portrays an older version of Oliver Queen from Earth-16.
- Professor Martin Stein / Firestorm (portrayed by Victor Garber) – A member of the Legends, nuclear physicist, and half of the superhero Firestorm with Jefferson Jackson from Earth-1. Garber reprises his role from Legends of Tomorrow.
- Joe West (portrayed by Jesse L. Martin) – Iris West's father and member of Earth's Central City Police Department. Martin reprises the role from The Flash.
- Felicity Smoak / Overwatch (portrayed by Emily Bett Rickards) – An I.T. expert, associate and wife of Oliver Queen from Earth-1. Rickards reprises her role from Arrow.
- Sara Lance / White Canary (portrayed by Caity Lotz) – A former member of the League of Assassins and leader of the Legends from Earth-1. Lotz reprises her role from Arrow and Legends of Tomorrow.
- Harrison "Harry" Wells (portrayed by Tom Cavanagh) – A member of Team Flash from Earth-2. Cavanagh reprises his role from The Flash.
  - Eobard Thawne / Reverse-Flash (also portrayed by Cavanagh) – A rogue time-traveling speedster and Barry Allen's nemesis from Earth-1's distant future. Cavanagh reprises his role from The Flash.
  - Nash Wells / Pariah (also portrayed by Cavanagh) – A multiversal explorer who was tricked into releasing the Anti-Monitor and turned into a "pariah" because of it.
- Mick Rory / Heat Wave (portrayed by Dominic Purcell) – A member of the Legends and former criminal from Earth-1, who wields a fire-shooting gun. Purcell reprises his role from The Flash and Legends of Tomorrow.
- Iris West (portrayed by Candice Patton) – Barry Allen's fiancé and associate from Earth-1. Patton reprises her role from The Flash.
- Jefferson Jackson / Firestorm (portrayed by Franz Drameh) – A member of the Legends and the other half of Firestorm with Martin Stein from Earth-1. Drameh reprises his role from Legends of Tomorrow.
- Caitlin Snow / Killer Frost (portrayed by Danielle Panabaker) – A S.T.A.R. Labs bio-engineering expert and metahuman with cryokinetic abilities from Earth-1. Panabaker reprises her role from The Flash.
- Wally West / Kid Flash (portrayed by Keiynan Lonsdale) – Iris' brother with similar abilities as Barry Allen from Earth-1. Lonsdale reprises his role from The Flash.
- David Singh (portrayed by Patrick Sabongui) – The police captain of Earth-1's Central City Police Department. Sabongui reprises his role from The Flash.
- Clarissa Stein (portrayed by Isabella Hofmann) – The wife of Martin Stein from Earth-1. Hofmann reprises her role from The Flash
- Lily Stein (portrayed by Christina Brucato) – The daughter and scientific colleague of Martin Stein as well as a nano-tech specialist from Earth-1. Brucato reprises her role from The Flash.
- Cecile Horton (portrayed by Danielle Nicolet) – Joe West's girlfriend from Earth-1. Nicolet reprises her role from The Flash.
- Nora West-Allen (portrayed by Jessica Parker Kennedy) – A mysterious girl with super-speed. She was first seen at the wedding of Barry Allen and Iris West before Dark Arrow's forces crashed it. Nora later appeared in The Flash where she introduces herself as the future version of Barry Allen and Iris West's daughter.
- Jindah Kol Rozz (portrayed by Sarah Douglas) – A disgraced Kryptonian priestess imprisoned at Fort Rozz who has vital information about the esoteric cult that Reign is from. Douglas portrayed another Kryptonian criminal Ursa in Superman (1978) and Superman II (1980).
- Mrs. Schott (portrayed by Laurie Metcalf) – Winn's estranged mother and the wife of Toyman.
- Jacqueline Nimball (portrayed by Brooke Smith) – The protégé and successor of Toyman who is a genderbent version of Jack Nimball.
- Tanya (portrayed by Nesta Cooper) – A resident of National City who became a member of the Cult of Rao.
- Jul-Us (portrayed by Tim Russ) – A Kryptonian who survived Krypton's destruction and is a member of Argo City's High Council.
- Arthur Willis (portrayed by Bradley White) – A man who planned revenge against a firm by selling DEO-based weapons.
- Thara Ak-Var (portrayed by Esmé Bianco) – A Kryptonian and an old friend of Kara's who lives in Argo City.
- Val (portrayed by Benjamin Goas) – A Kryptonian who lives in Argo City.
- Felra (portrayed by Kerry Sandomirsky) – A Kryptonian who lives who Argo City and serves a servant of Selena.
- Lir-Al (portrayed by Todd Thomson) – A Kryptonian who lives in Argo City.
- Vita (portrayed by Rosemary Hoschchild) – A Kryptonian dark priestess who serves as a member of Selena's Worldkiller Coven.
  - Hoschchild also portrays her bottled Earth counterpart that worked with the evil Brainiac 5 doppelganger to free their Earth.
  - Hoschchild also portrays her virtual reality counterpart that is the emcee of a bar that Alex's Supergirl form attended.

William Katt cameos as the minister who presided over Barry Allen and Iris West's wedding before he was incinerated by Overgirl when Dark Arrow's forces attacked.

=== Introduced in season four ===
- Yvette (portrayed by Roxy Wood) – The transgender roommate of Nia.
- Fiona Byrne (portrayed by Tiya Sircar) – An Empath from the planet Ikthanol who falls in love with Manchester Black. She works as a bartender and alien activist before being captured by the Children of Liberty and stabbed by Agent Liberty. After she is found in a dying state in Mercy's van, Martian Manhunter tries to heal Fiona who has her final moments with Manchester. Her death motivates Manchester to plan revenge on those responsible.
- Dr. Rohan Vose (portrayed by Vincent Gale) – A well-regarded member of Fiona's alien support group who is attacked and tortured by the Children of Liberty.
- Peter Lockwood (portrayed by Xander Berkeley) – The alien-hating father of Ben Lockwood, a traditionalist who refuses to consider adapting to a changing world and blames alien refugees for his troubles. He is revealed to have perished during the events of the third-season finale where he chooses to stay in his collapsing steel factory rather than accept things as they were. Peter's attitudes and actions would drive his son to radicalization, despite Ben having been initially more fair-minded.
- Alana (portrayed by Dominique Lucky Martel) – A girl of an unspecified alien race who is the owner of Spike.
- Spike – Spike is a Dracokardosian, a dragon-like alien who can assume a smaller, lizard-like form. When the Children of Liberty attacked the house of Alana, Spike assumed his true form and went on a rampage until Supergirl calmed him down. When the Crisis on Infinite Earths was beginning, this affected Spike who went berserk causing Supergirl to calm him down before he can harm a doomsday protester.
- Dean Petrocelli (portrayed by Kirby Morrow) – A National City police officer and member of the Children of Liberty. He is killed by Manchester Black.
- John Deegan (portrayed by Jeremy Davies) – A psychiatrist from Earth-1 Arkham Asylum who is given the Book of Destiny by the Monitor. His second use of the Book of Destiny gives him the appearance of Superman wearing a version of his black suit. After a talk with the Monitor, Green Arrow fires an arrow which negates the Book of Destiny's effects and leaves Deegan disfigured. Deegan is remanded to Arkham Asylum where he becomes a neighbor of Psycho-Pirate.
- Lois Lane (portrayed by Elizabeth Tulloch) – A reporter at the Daily Planet on Earth-38 and the love interest of Superman. Lois later helped out during the Crisis. Following the Crisis where Earth-Prime is formed, she and Superman now have two children.
- Kate Kane / Batwoman (portrayed by Ruby Rose) – The cousin of Bruce Wayne on Earth-1 who runs Wayne Enterprises and fights crime after Bruce Wayne disappeared from Gotham City three years ago.
- John Diggle (portrayed by David Ramsey) – An A.R.G.U.S. agent and close friend of Oliver Queen and Felicity Smoak from Earth-1. In season six, Jimmy Olsen asks John Diggle to help Kelly after Nyxly imploded the Ormfell Building. He helps out Supergirl's group, the victims of the implosion, and gives Kelly the inspiration to improve her work as Guardian.
- Roger Hayden / Psycho-Pirate (portrayed by Bob Frazer) – An inmate at Arkham Asylum. When John Deegan is incarcerated, Psycho-Pirate is in the cell that is next door to his as he tells Deegan "worlds will live, worlds will die, and the universe will never be the same."
- Nora Fries (portrayed by Cassandra Jean Amell) – An inmate at Arkham Asylum.
- Gary Green (portrayed by Adam Tsekhman) - A Time Bureau agent who works alongside of the Legends. In Elseworld, he works as a bartender at a nightclub own by Cisco as a crime-boss.
- A.M.A.Z.O. – An android created by Ivo Laboratories on behalf of A.R.G.U.S. that can copy the powers of every metahuman and other beings with superhuman abilities it scans. It takes the combination of Superman, Supergirl, and Oliver Queen as Flash to enable Barry Allen as Green Arrow to hit it with a computer virus-loaded arrow. Another A.M.A.Z.O. returns as part of a new reality created by John Deegan. This one is defeated by Brainiac 5.
- General Alfonso Tan (portrayed by Russell Wong) – A colleague of Lauren Haley's, he assisted her in the indoctrination of a pair of aliens called Morae into becoming weapons for the US government. When the decision is made to terminate them, the Morae kill him.
- Maeve Nal (portrayed by Hannah James) – Nia Nal's older sister. The two were close growing up, with Maeve being Nia's staunchest supporter in embracing her gender identity, but their relationship is strained when it comes out that Nia inherited the Naltorian powers of their mother's lineage. Maeve, certain for years that she would inherit them, lashes out at her sister, even saying Nia is "not even a real woman" – words she immediately regrets, but does not take back.
- Isabel Nal (portrayed by Kate Burton) – The mother of Maeve and Nia and wife of Paul, Isabel is a Naltorian who emigrated to Earth years ago where she started her family. Having inherited her Dreamer abilities from her own mother, when her younger daughter Nia unexpected inherits them instead of Maeve, Isabel encourages her to accept her destiny before she succumbs to a deadly spider bite not long after.
- Jerry Miller (portrayed by Brennan Mejia) – The drug-dealing partner of Kevin whose product is altered by happenstance and is stolen by the Children of Liberty.
- Kevin Huggins (portrayed by Lukas Gage) – The drug-dealing partner of Jerry whose product is altered by happenstance and is stolen by the Children of Liberty.
- Paul Nal (portrayed by Garwin Sanford) – The human father of Nia and Maeve, he took the Nal surname when he married their mother Isabel. A kind and gentle man, he loves his wife dearly and trusts her instinctively. Devastated by her sudden death, he nonetheless follows instructions she gives him in a dream to discreetly give Nia her superhero costume without tipping off Maeve.
- Pam Ferrer / Menagerie (portrayed by Jessica Meraz) – A jewel thief who got bonded to a snakelike alien symbiote, transforming her into the superpowered villain Menagerie. After she killed her partner Chuck and some other people, Menagerie was confronted by Supergirl, Martian Manhunter, Brainiac 5, and Alex Danvers. Their fight attracted the attention of the Children of Liberty. When Menagerie planned to rob the masquerade ball, she encountered Nia Nal as Supergirl and George Lockwood show up. While she did manage to subdue Supergirl, the snake-like alien on Menagerie was beheaded by George Lockwood. President Baker made an example out of Menagerie and had her incarcerated. While in her cell, Menagerie received a pleasing letter from Manchester Black. She later escapes with him and helps to form the Elite.
- Hat (portrayed by Louis Ozawa Changchien) – An alien whose hat has 5th Dimension properties. He joins up with the Elite to help Manchester Black deal with the anti-alien bigotry of the Children of Liberty and the ineffectiveness of the government and DEO. Mxyzptlk later mentioned in season five that Hat was an old drinking buddy of his who stole his hat.
- Quentin (portrayed by Jonathan Bennett) – A man who was assigned by President Baker to be Ben Lockwood's bodyguard.
- Baby Sun-Eater – An infant Sun-Eater that was originally found by Superman in one of his adventures and is kept in a special chamber at the Fortress of Solitude. After Earth-Prime is formed, the same baby Sun-Eater was released from its chamber by a Morae that is loyal to Leviathan after it followed Lena to the Fortress of Solitude. With help from Martian Manhunter and Miss Martian, Supergirl placed a capsule into its core to reduce it to a harmless state. Then Supergirl placed the baby Sun-Eater back into its chamber.
- Bitsie Teschmacher (portrayed by Jill Morrison) – The cousin of Eve Teschmacher and the mother of two girls. She came down with cancer and resided in a hospice until Eve gave Bitsie Lena Luthor's Harun-El drug, curing her.
- Steve Lomelli (portrayed by Willie Garson) – An inmate at Stryker's Island who knew Lex Luthor.

=== Introduced in season five ===
- Mallory (portrayed by Ellexis Wejr) – A girl who Malefic poses as while he gathered components to make a Phantom Zone projector to release Midnight.
- Hope (voiced by Kari Wahlgren) – An A.I. that was created by Lena Luthor. After mapping out Eve Teschmacher's brain, Lena uploads Hope into Eve's body.
- Midnight (portrayed by Jennifer Cheon Garcia) – The physical manifestation of darkness and a murderous villain released from the Phantom Zone. She was freed by Malefic to enact revenge against J'onn J'onzz, who put her there.
- Pete Andrews (portrayed by Sean Astin) – A man who Malefic poses as to get close to Kelly.
- Caroline O'Connor (portrayed by Brea St. James) – A special forces commander who becomes possessed by spider-like Aurafacian symbiotes which grant her spider-like abilities. After Alex removes the parasites, Caroline is killed by an unknown assailant who is revealed to be Acrata.
- Breathtaker (portrayed by Luisa D'Oliveira) – An aerokinetic Leviathan assassin who was tasked to kill Elaine Torres only to be thwarted by Supergirl and handed over to the DEO
- Rip Roar / Russel Rogers (portrayed by Nick Sagar) – An old college friend of William Dey's and former boyfriend of Andrea Rojas. While he was believed to have been killed in an accident, he was secretly transformed into an armored assassin named Rip Roar armed with retractable tentacles after Andrea told Leviathan member Margot that he can be of use to them. He was sent to cause an eruption in the Arctic and flood the world's coastal cities, only to be thwarted by Supergirl and Martian Manhunter. Owing to his armor, the latter couldn't read his mind. News of Rip Roar's apprehension reached Leviathan as Margot assigns Andrea to retrieve him. After Andrea frees him, she attempts to run away with Rip Roar, but he is killed by an unseen Leviathan operative now that he's served his purpose. When Earth-Prime is formed after the Crisis, William states to Kara that he suspects the Luthor family did away with him to acquire his company.
- Bernardo Rojas (portrayed by Steven Bauer) – The father of Andrea Rojas.
- Male Leviathan Representative (portrayed by Duncan Fraser) – An unnamed elderly Leviathan member who persuades Andrea to take the Acrata medallion. He later told her where her abilities came from following Rip Roar's death.
- Alexander Knox (portrayed by Robert Wuhl) – A reporter from Earth-89.
- Dick Grayson (portrayed by Burt Ward) – An aged version of Robin from Earth-66 who was walking his dog when the Crisis began.
- Lyla Michaels / Harbinger (portrayed by Audrey Marie Anderson) – An A.R.G.U.S. director and John Diggle's wife who becomes Harbinger after the Monitor recruits her to help him avert the impending crisis. Anderson reprises the role from Arrow.
- Ray Palmer / Atom (portrayed by Brandon Routh) – A scientist and inventor capable of shrinking and growing to immense sizes whilst wearing a special suit as well as a member of the Legends. Routh reprises his role from Arrow and Legends of Tomorrow.
- Mia Smoak (portrayed by Katherine McNamara) – The daughter of Oliver Queen who was brought from the year 2040 by the Monitor. McNamara reprises her role from Arrow.
- Amy Sapphire (portrayed by Camille Sullivan) – A Chlorophyllian who planned revenge on Andrea Rojas for firing her husband Todd because of his virtual reality addiction and later suicide. She then made an attack on Obsidian Tech's power core before being talked down by Supergirl. It was later revealed that Eve Teschmacher provided the gauntlets to her on Lex Luthor's behalf.
- Gregory Bauer (portrayed by Pierson Fodé) – An anti-LGBTQ man who attacks transgender people. His activity evoked the wrath of Dreamer. After he was subdued by Dreamer who was persuaded to spare him by Supergirl, Dreamer states that he's going away for a long time and will give him a nightmare if he goes after people like her again. It was later revealed that he was part of an LGBTQ hate group when Brainiac 5 gave the information about them to Detective Rivers.
- Richard Bates (portrayed by Jesse Moss) – A man from Opal City who tested out the Obsidian Platinum lenses. After an error, Kelly frees him as he is treated by Margot. Two years later, Richard rose to the ranks of the virtual reality's elite where he started modding an escape room house in Virtual Vegas. This was his way to avenge Trevor Crane's hitting on his wife as Richard trapped in a state where he would constantly explode and reassemble. When knocked out of virtual reality by Alex, Richard is defeated by Martian Manhunter upon his arrival as his virtual reality lenses start to glitch. Richard is then shipped off to the hospital as J'onn and Alex wonder if he can be charged for murder in virtual reality. It was later revealed that he learned of the patch information from a bartender who is in contact with Lex Luthor.
- Jennifer Bates (portrayed by Anna Van Hooft) – The wife of Richard Bates who lives in Opal City. She told J'onn about her husband and how she met Trevor Khan as J'onn gets the name of the hotel he is at.
- Trevor Crane (portrayed by Corbin Bleu) – The brother of Al who took part in Obsidian Tech's Virtual Vegas. After saving him from Richard, Alex rescued Trevor from his trap and had J'onn pick him up from the hotel he was staying at.
- Rivers (portrayed by Doron Bell) – A detective for the National City Police Department who investigates the attacks on transgender women. After Gregory Bauer was handed over to the police, Brainiac 5 met with him and gave him the information on the hate group that Gregory was a part of and the user names of its known members.
- Bonnie Walker (portrayed by Anne Hollister) – A woman using Obsidian Lenses who Alex as Supergirl met. She used the alias of a treasure hunter named Tillie and is among those who become trapped in virtual reality. Margot later appears with some people to claim her body.
- Derek (portrayed by John Murphy) – A man using Obsidian Lenses who operates as a musician in virtual reality. His body is among those in the possession of Leviathan.
- Tezumak - A pyrokinetic member of Leviathan. He assisted Rama Khan and Sela in fighting Martian Manhunter, Miss Martian, Alex, and Dreamer. When Brainiac 5 enters a code into the Leviathan ship, the three of them are teleported to the ship and are bottled by Brainiac 5.
- Sela (portrayed by Michelle Christa Smith) - An electrokinetic member of Leviathan. She assisted Rama Khan and Tezumak in fighting Martian Manhunter, Miss Martian, Alex, and Dreamer. When Brainiac 5 enters a code into the Leviathan ship, the three of them are teleported to the ship and are bottled by Brainiac 5.
- Mrs. Teschmacher (portrayed by Lynda Boyd) - The mother of Eve Teschmacher.

Kate Micucci cameos as a museum tour guide in "Event Horizon." Wil Wheaton and Griffin Newman both cameo in "Crisis on Infinite Earths: Part One" as a doomsday protester and a trivia night host respectively. Alan Ritchson, Curran Walters, and Russell Tovey make uncredited cameos in "Crisis on Infinite Earths: Part One" as Hank Hall / Hawk and Jason Todd / Robin of Earth-9, and Ray Terrill / Ray of Earth-X respectively with the former two appearing through archive footage from the "Trigon" episode. Steph Song cameos as a woman also doing the Supergirl experience.

=== Introduced in season six ===
- Silas White (portrayed by Claude Knowlton) - A Transilvanian that was the first person to break into the Phantom Zone when his boyfriend Owen was wrongfully convicted there and was traumatized by the Phantom Zone Phantoms. Supergirl's friends find him trying to get blood from the Luthor Foundation Bloodbank and persuade him to help rescue Supergirl. He was later attacked by a Phantom and converted into one by its attack. When the chrysalis used by the Phantom to place the souls it claims into it was destroyed by Alex, Silas and those who were converted with restored to normal.
- Scar (portrayed by Sandy Robson) - A Kryptonian and Phantom Zone inmate who alongside his fellow inmates plotted to feed Zor-El to a creature that lives in Shadow Lake. With help from Nyxly, Kara rescued her father as Nyxly teleports Scar and his men away.
- Professor Naxim Tork (portrayed by Chris William Martin) - An alien poacher from an unknown planet who came to Earth riding a Bismolian ship looking for a Kryptonian to add to his menagerie. There was a reference that he had dealt with Superman before and was mentioned in the original history to have been caught by the DEO who found him in Uruguay. At the time when Brainy and Dreamer came to the year 2006 to obtain Kara's DNA from the Kryptonite meteor that she stopped, Tork did a runaway truck trick to draw out Kara which fail while his ship also detected the alien species that Brainy and Dreamer are a part of. When the two of them went looking for Tork, he led them into a trap that involved cloaking his ship and using an energy trap. After some incidents that led to the accidental capture of Cat and Kenny, Brainy and Tork fix everything to ensure that Tork is found in Uruguay by the DEO Years later, Tork and Mitch were freed by Lex Luthor prior to the DEO headquarters' destruction and has gone his separate way from Mitch.
- Wyatt Kote (portrayed by Tom Jackson) - The warden of Van Kull Prison who has been using the work release program to cover up the illegal activities he was secretly collaborating with Intergang on. After the prisoners were convinced to surrender by Supergirl, William Dey mentioned in a news report that Kote and those involved were arrested by the police.
- Joey Davis (portrayed by Aiden Stoxx) - A Zeltarian and the younger brother of Orlando who was placed in a foster care after Orlando was arrested. Upon Kelly hearing about Orlando's condition from Joey, she enlisted Supergirl to help check up on him.
- Ms. Hochschild (portrayed by Susan Hogan) - The head of a foster home for alien children that Kelly visits. Upon noticing the bad treatment Ms. Hochschild did to a lashing-out Joey on the security footage she salvaged, Kelly leaked the footage to Ms. Hochschild's superiors which led to her being fired and arrested by the police.
- Marta (portrayed by Nadia Batista) - An alien girl in Ms. Hochschild's foster home that often causes problems for Esme.
- Larry Chapman (portrayed by John Gillich) - A prison guard at Van Kull Prison who assisted Warden Kote in Intergang's plot.
- Jean Rankin (portrayed by Kari Matchett) - A councilwoman who planned to have the Ormfell Building taken down upon selling it to a tech company. After being caught in the implosion caused by Nyxly which exposed her to 5th Dimensional energies, Rankin pressured a doctor to give her the experimental medicine. As its side-effect, Rankin tapped into its energies at the cost of draining energy from its victims. After Guardian's first scuffle with her, the rest of Supergirl's group were persuaded to put tracking Nyxly on hold to handle the situation. Guardian and Supergirl took on Rankin until Brainiac 5 used a siphon device to remove the 5th Dimensional energies and cure the victims. Rankin was mentioned to have been handed over to the police.
- Dr. Desmond Raab (portrayed by Tom Lim) - An Edifarian engineering expert who Mitch abducted so that he can make a weapon for Mitch and Nyxly to trap Supergirl. This led to him creating a cryo-bomb which was later doctored by Nyxly to help her regain her powers.
- Elizabeth Walsh (portrayed by Katie McGrath) - The mother of Lena Luthor who was a witch that became one of Lionel Luthor's mistress. She was remembered as being a bad witch when Margaret Bishop was accidentally killed in one of her activities.
- Margaret Bishop (portrayed by Emmanuelle Vaugier) - A witch who was a friend of Elizabeth Walsh. She was accidentally killed in one of Elizabeth's activities.
- Peggy Bishop (portrayed by Emmanuelle Vaugier) - The daughter of Margaret Bishop who works as a bartender. She has been bitter over the fact that her mother was killed by Elizabeth.
- Florence Abbott (portrayed by Colleen Wheeler) - A witch who was a friend of Elizabeth Walsh. After Margaret was accidentally killed, Florence went into hiding in a cave somewhere where she still makes contact with Elizabeth's ghost. Thanks to Andrea, Lena found Florence who revealed to her Elizabeth's past and that Lena has her mother's abilities which haven't been unlocked yet.
- King Brpxz (portrayed by Adrian Hough) - The King of the 5th Dimension who was nicknamed the Mad King due to him being a paranoid narcissist. He was responsible for sending his daughter Nyxly to the Phantom Zone and killing his son Bryxly.
- Bryxly (portrayed by Spender John Borgeson) - The brother of Nyxly and son of King Brpxz who was murdered by his own father because the 5th Dimension Imps loved Bryxly more than their king.
- Totem Oracle (voiced by Andrew Morgado) - A voice that judges anyone wanting to claim the Totems upon quoting "Cgyrzyx".
- Secretary Brown (portrayed by Crystal Balint) - A secretary that oversees the peace talks between Corto Maltese and Kaznia.

== See also ==
- List of DC Comics characters
- List of Arrow characters
- List of The Flash characters
- List of Legends of Tomorrow characters
- List of Arrowverse actors
