= Sherlock =

Sherlock may refer to:

== Arts and entertainment ==
- Sherlock Holmes, a fictional detective created by Arthur Conan Doyle
  - Sherlock (TV series), a BBC TV series that started in 2010
  - Sherlock Hemlock, a Muppet from the TV show Sesame Street
  - Sherlock (video game), a 1984 text adventure by Melbourne House
  - Sherlock: Untold Stories, a Japanese TV series aired in 2019
- Sherlock (EP), by Shinee

== People ==
Given name

- Sherlock James Andrews (1801–1880), American lawyer and abolitionist Congressman
- Sherlock Bristol (1815–1906), American congregational clergyman
- Sherlock Houston Carmer (1842–1884), American politician

Surname

- Allie Sherlock (born 2005), Irish singer
- Charles Sherlock (born 1945), Australian theologian
- Cornelius Sherlock (d.1888), English architect
- Doris Sherlock (1916–2001), American politician
- Frank Sherlock (born 1969), poet
- Glenn Sherlock (born 1960), American baseball player and coach
- Jack Sherlock (1908–1958), English footballer
- John Michael Sherlock (1926–2019), Canadian Roman Catholic bishop
- James Sherlock (born 1983), pianist
- John Sherlock (general) (c. 1705–1794), Irish-born general in Spain
- Kurt Sherlock (born 1963), rugby player
- Marie Sherlock, Irish politician
- Paul Sherlock (born 1973), English footballer
- Peta Sherlock (born 1946), Australian Anglican priest and theologian
- Peter Sherlock (born 1972), Australian academic and Vice-Chancellor
- Richard Sherlock (born 1983), cricketer
- Thomas Sherlock (1678–1761), English bishop and son of William
- William Sherlock (theologian) (1641–1707), English church leader
- William Sherlock (cricketer) (1881–1937)

== Places ==
=== Australia ===
- Sherlock, South Australia, near Tailem Bend
- Sherlock, Western Australia, between Roebourne and Port Hedland:
  - Sherlock River (Western Australia)
  - Sherlock Station, a pastoral lease

=== United States ===
- Sherlock, Texas, an unincorporated community
- Sherlock Township, Finney County, Kansas

== Other uses ==
- Sherlock (software), used by Apple Macintosh, also describing the phenomenon of third-party software being rendered irrelevant by Apple
- Sherlock (crater), a crater on Earth's Moon in Taurus-Littrow valley

== See also ==
- Sherlock Holmes (disambiguation)
- Young Sherlock (disambiguation)
- SHERLOC, spectrometer used in Mars exploration
- Sherlac Point
- Sherluck
- Sherloque Wells, a character in The Flash television series
