= The Flash season 7 =

The Flash
- Season 7
- Promotional poster
- Showrunner: Eric Wallace
- Starring: Grant Gustin; Candice Patton; Danielle Panabaker; Carlos Valdes; Danielle Nicolet; Kayla Compton; Brandon McKnight; Efrat Dor; Tom Cavanagh; Jesse L. Martin
- No. of episodes: 18

Release
- Original network: The CW
- Original release: March 2 – July 20, 2021

Season chronology
- ← Previous; Season 6 Next → Season 8

The seventh season of the American television series The Flash, which is based on the DC Comics character Barry Allen / Flash, premiered on The CW on March 2, 2021. The season follows Barry confronting Eva McCulloch, also known as the Mirror Monarch, who has taken control of McCulloh Technologies and her late husband's criminal organization, Black Hole, in an attempt to gain control of Central City. At the same time, Barry tries to find a way to locate his missing wife, Iris West-Allen, who remains trapped in the Mirrorverse, while the remaining speed force within Barry continues to diminish. The season also deals with the consequences of the resurrection of the Speed Force and the ensuing Godspeed war. It is set in the Arrowverse, sharing continuity with the other television series of the universe, and is a spin-off of Arrow. The season is produced by Berlanti Productions, Warner Bros. Television, and DC Entertainment, with Eric Wallace as showrunner.

The season was ordered on January 7, 2020. Production began that October and concluded the following May. Grant Gustin stars as Barry, with principal cast members Candice Patton, Danielle Panabaker, Carlos Valdes, Danielle Nicolet, Efrat Dor, Tom Cavanagh, and Jesse L. Martin also returning from previous seasons, while Kayla Compton and Brandon McKnight were promoted to series regulars from their recurring and guest status in season six. This is the last season to feature Valdes, Cavanagh and Dor as series regulars. The series was renewed for an eighth season on February 3, 2021, which premiered on November 16, 2021.

== Episodes ==
Season seven is broken into two "Graphic Novel" storyline arcs, known as the third and fourth graphic novel respectively; this numbering continues from the first two "Graphic Novels" established in season six. The first three episodes of the season conclude the second "Graphic Novel" that began in and was supposed to end in season six.

The Flash season 7 episodes
No. overall	No. in season	Title	Directed by	Written by	Original release date	Prod. code	U.S. viewers (millions)
Graphic Novel #2: Reflections and Lies (cont.)
134	1	"All's Wells That Ends Wells"	Geoff Shotz	Sam Chalsen & Lauren Certo	March 2, 2021	T27.14151	1.00
Having cryogenically frozen himself to preserve his 1% Speed Force energy, Barry Allen awakens when Eva McCulloch is spotted destroying Black Hole's remnants. He tries to convince her to stop and release his wife, Iris West-Allen, from the Mirrorverse, but to no avail, as Eva ends her latest attack by destroying Sam Scudder, her first mirror duplicate, in front of Rosalind Dillon. Cecile Horton interrogates Dillon, learning that she is working with Eva. Using her empath abilities, Cecile gets Dillon to reveal that Eva plans to use a bomb to destroy a Black Hole plane over Central City. Meanwhile, Nash and the Wellses occupying his mind realize they can activate Barry's Artificial Speed Force (ASF) generator, but it would result in Nash's death. He attempts to explore other methods but, with time running out, Nash sacrifices himself and the other Wellses to restore Barry's speed. Barry saves Central City and intends to inform his friends about Nash's sacrifice. Elsewhere, Iris attempts to escape the Mirrorverse. Eva discovers she is also a mirror duplicate and the real Eva died in the S.T.A.R. Labs particle accelerator explosion.
135	2	"The Speed of Thought"	Alexandra La Roche	Jonathan Butler & Gabriel Garza	March 9, 2021	T27.14152	0.99
After mourning Nash and the Wellses, Barry and Cisco Ramon work towards saving Iris, Kamilla Hwang, and CCPD Captain David Singh by opening a portal to the Mirrorverse. Barry discovers the ASF granted him speed-thinking, allowing him to predict outcomes while causing him to become impersonal. Using his new abilities, he exposes Eva as an imposter on live television, forcing her to flee. However, a choice emerges: save Iris or save Kamilla and Singh. When Barry prioritizes saving Iris exclusively, Cisco, Frost, and Allegra Garcia join forces to stop him, but fail. Meanwhile, Iris plans a rendezvous with Kamilla and Singh, but they experience seizures. When Barry opens the portal, he forces Iris to come through alone, but she also experiences seizures. This shocks Barry into realizing what he has done and disabling the ASF. Elsewhere, a maddened Eva schemes to take over the world by replacing everyone with mirror duplicates while a confused Earth-1 Harrison Wells materializes where his corpse was 20 years after his death.
136	3	"Mother"	David McWhirter	Eric Wallace & Kristen Kim	March 16, 2021	T27.14153	0.98
Eva begins replacing people with mirror duplicates. Sue Dearbon and Ralph Dibny return with evidence to exonerate Sue of Eva's crimes, but Ralph has become a blob since the destruction of McCulloch Technologies. Though Eva convinces Barry he cannot win, Wells comes to S.T.A.R. Labs and reminds him that he is the Paragon of Love. As Barry checks on Iris, he revives her. Barry and his team re-activate the ASF and fight the duplicates while Barry revives the original Speed Force before he and Iris convince Eva to stand down. Showing remorse, Eva tries to stop her duplicates, but they become too powerful, so she joins forces with Barry and Iris to destroy them. After freeing her prisoners, Eva leaves for the Mirrorverse to start anew. Claiming that he can now perceive all of his life at once and travel freely through time and space, Wells decides to put himself in a time loop so he can live peacefully with his wife, Tess Morgan, while an exonerated Sue and a recuperating Ralph travel the world to stop other Black Hole-esque organizations. 18 hours earlier, when Barry and Iris revived the Speed Force, they unknowingly released four differently colored lightning bolts.
Graphic Novel #3: God Complex
137	4	"Central City Strong"	Jeff Byrd	Story by : Kristen Kim; Teleplay by : Joshua V. Gilbert & Jeff Hersh	March 23, 2021	T27.14154	0.98
One week after Eva's attack, Central City begins to rebuild as Iris and Allegra work to cover the Mirrorverse incident for the Central City Citizen. The former struggles to face the trauma from her ordeal in the Mirrorverse while Barry grapples with his guilt over not deducing Mirror-Iris was an impostor. Meanwhile, Abra Kadabra returns and lets himself be arrested by A.R.G.U.S. so he can complete an anti-matter bomb that he intends to use on Central City, making Barry suffer in retaliation for his family being erased from existence following the Crisis. Barry successfully talks Kadabra into disabling the bomb, but they are suddenly attacked by a monster, which absorbs the bomb. Kadabra attempts to save Barry, but is killed by the monster. It nearly kills Barry as well, but it winces in pain and runs off. Allegra is promoted to staff writer and Iris joins a Mirrorverse support group. Elsewhere, after both suffering from headaches, Frost and Caitlin Snow reveal to Cisco that they have separated from each other.
138	5	"Fear Me"	David McWhirter	Story by : Thomas Pound; Teleplay by : Lauren Barnett & Christina M. Walker	March 30, 2021	T27.14155	0.91
Due to Eva using her Mirror Gun on Caitlin, Frost's metahuman DNA created a new body. Caitlin and Frost argue over whether to re-merge or stay separated, but eventually agree to the latter. Barry is visited by the Speed Force, as his mother Nora Allen, carrying the same energy signature as the monster that attacked Barry and Kadabra, nicknamed "Fuerza." Barry gives the Speed Force his speed gauge to monitor its health before fighting a new enemy, Psych, who is using fear waves to trap everyone in Central City in perpetual nightmares. Barry is injured by one involving Eobard Thawne and Savitar. Team Flash uses Barry's speed, Cecile's abilities, and Clifford DeVoe's hover-chair to produce a courage wave to stop Psych. However, he disappears and Barry returns to his cryogenic chamber to recover. Elsewhere, Kristen Kramer, a liaison from the Governor's Municipal Logistics Commission, arrives at the CCPD, where she tells Joe that she is there to arrest Frost. Later, the Speed Force says that she was attacked by Psych and Fuerza and both of them are "like her."
139	6	"The One with the Nineties"	Jeff Byrd	Kelly Wheeler & Emily Palizzi	April 6, 2021	T27.14156	0.97
Cisco and Chester P. Runk create devices to detect Fuerza and Psych. While setting one near Chester's hometown, however, they get trapped in a time loop of the day before Chester's dad, Quincy, died in a car crash. With Quincy's help, Chester and Cisco build a device to detect and protect themselves from the "time god" Deon Owens, a high school quarterback who is attempting to prevent an injury that ruined his football career. Chester convinces him to let go of his past and that the future remains unwritten, causing Deon to realize he can change everyone's futures before vanishing, thereby ending the time loop and returning Chester and Cisco to the present. The two fail to find Deon, though they believe he is unaware of the Speed Force's revival. Cisco later discovers three other "forces," names them Still, Strength, and Sage, and determines Deon, Fuerza, and Psych are their respective conduits. Meanwhile, Barry emerges from his cryo-chamber and Iris bonds with the Speed Force before inviting it to stay with her and Barry. Elsewhere, Chester begins working on his father's old project while Joe warns Frost about Kramer, though Frost refuses to hide.
140	7	"Growing Pains"	Alexandra La Roche	Sam Chalsen & Jess Carson	April 13, 2021	T27.14157	0.89
Despite healing from his battle with Psych, Barry's powers glitch whenever he is around the Speed Force. It tries to help, but its appearance unsettles Barry. Meanwhile, a microchip is stolen from Ivo Laboratories and a driver is killed by someone with ice powers. Kramer believes Frost is the culprit and issues a warrant for her arrest. Despite being asked not to, Frost visits her old bar to find information on the criminal from the new bartender, Mark Blaine. Now calling himself "Chillblaine," however, he reveals that he created the microchip before he was fired and used his own cryogenic technology to replicate Frost's powers and frame her. He defeats her, but she stabs him. Barry and Allegra arrive and provide medical attention while Frost reveals she recorded Blaine's confession. As Kramer and the police arrive, Frost chooses to turn herself in and surrenders peacefully. Barry and "Nora" acknowledge that she is different from the Speed Force entity he knew before and the two vow to fight the other Forces.
141	8	"The People V. Killer Frost"	Sudz Sutherland	Jonathan Butler & Gabriel Garza	May 4, 2021	T27.14158	0.74
Barry and "Nora" search for Fuerza in Keystone City and meet Alexa Rivera, but "Nora" believes Alexa is Fuerza and scares her. Barry gains her trust and learns that Alexa has been blacking out whenever she gets angry. At S.T.A.R. Labs, Team Flash confirms she is Fuerza. "Nora" attacks Iris and uses Barry's powers to kill Alexa. Meanwhile, at Frost's trial, Kramer attempts to force her to take the metahuman cure instead of prison time. Distraught, Caitlin has her mother, Carla Tannhauser, test if the cure would harm Frost. Cisco helps Caitlin and Allegra break into CCPD to neutralize the cures. However, Kramer accuses Frost of the act and reveals another vial she procured from A.R.G.U.S. Tannhauser confirms the cure will not harm Frost and urges her to take it, but Frost is worried she will lose her identity. Kramer reveals to Frost that she lost a platoon to a metahuman during "Operation Griffin." In court, Frost expresses how unjust forcing the cure on someone is and requests life imprisonment without parole, to which the judge agrees.
142	9	"Timeless"	Menhaj Huda	Kristen Kim & Joshua V. Gilbert	May 11, 2021	T27.14159	0.74
"Nora" tells Iris and Barry that they created the other Forces and vows to kill Psych and Deon. Barry wants to travel back in time to remove their connections to the Forces, but Iris and Cisco disagree. Cisco gives Kamilla a camera that can detect the Forces, allowing Team Citizen to track down "Nora." Barry, Cisco, and Chester enhance the tachyon device to extract the Forces' particles before Barry retrieves Wells to create a "time bubble" to protect the timeline. Realizing Barry's intentions, however, Deon arrives and destroys the device. During Team Citizen's search, they are ambushed by Psych, who gives Iris nightmares of "Nora." Chester fixes the device while Joe tries to dissuade Barry from his plan, but Barry and Wells go back in time regardless. The extraction revives Alexa and erases Psych and Deon in the present. However, Barry re-destroys the device to undo the changes upon realizing his allies are right. He and Iris then use their connection to the Forces to revive Alexa. Wells leaves and Cisco and Kamilla realize they need to leave Central City while "Nora" confronts Deon.
143	10	"Family Matters, Part 1"	Philip Chipera	Lauren Barnett & Emily Palizzi	May 18, 2021	T27.14160	0.67
While "Nora" reasons with Deon, Psych attacks billionaires. Iris learns Psych is Bashir Adil Malik, a former rich kid who was abandoned by his adoptive and biological parents. Kramer returns to the CCPD and asks Joe to bring in Barry to discuss metahuman transfers after getting information that Rainbow Raider went missing. She later reveals she had created bullets containing the metahuman cure with the governor's approval. Cecile advises Joe that Kramer must stop her hunt on her own, leading to Joe resigning from the CCPD to remain righteous. Concurrently, Barry, Cisco, and Caitlin train Alexa to control Fuerza, though Barry's determination to have Fuerza fight Psych results in Alexa injuring Cisco and becoming unmotivated. To help her, Caitlin gives Alexa a device to communicate with Fuerza. After Fuerza defends Barry from Psych, Barry convinces Psych to come to S.T.A.R. Labs. However, Deon and "Nora" arrive and attack Iris, Alexa, and Psych.
144	11	"Family Matters, Part 2"	Chad Lowe	Story by : Jonathan Butler & Gabriel Garza; Teleplay by : Thomas Pound	May 25, 2021	T27.14161	0.64
Iris, Alexa, and Bashir fake their deaths and escape using an illusion. Bashir convinces Alexa to go back and fight "Nora," who conjures a storm that knocks out Cecile and sets prisoners at Iron Heights free, though Frost stops Chillblaine. After failing to recruit Deon, Barry confronts "Nora," but she reveals that the other Forces conjured the storm. Deon betrays "Nora," but is forced to retreat. Joe proves to Barry and Iris that they are not bad parents and they reconcile with Alexa, Bashir, and Deon. They overpower "Nora" while the storm nears critical mass and threatens to destroy everything. Bashir and Deon show "Nora" a future completely empty of others, overwhelming her and convincing her to stop. With time running out, the Forces aid Barry so he can run fast enough to stop the storm. The Forces reconcile and depart to expand the Speed Force while Cecile regains consciousness. Frost returns to Caitlin's apartment after the District Attorney's office grants her time off for good behavior for her efforts during the storm and admits to having a crush on Chillblaine. While trying to process everything, Barry and Iris decide to start a family.
Interlude I
145	12	"Good-Bye Vibrations"	Philip Chipera	Kelly Wheeler & Jeff Hersh	June 8, 2021	T27.14162	0.74
Cisco accepts a job at A.R.G.U.S. and reveals that he and Kamilla are moving to Star City. Barry and Caitlin hide their feelings about Cisco leaving to avoid dissuading him, but this upsets him. Elsewhere, meta-human Carrie Bates, later nicknamed Rainbow Raider 2.0, tricks a bank teller into giving her money by placing him in a euphoric state. Barry and an overenthusiastic Cisco confront Bates using a device they used to stop the original Rainbow Raider, but Bates destroys it and sways Cisco, who ruins a second confrontation with Bates, allowing her to sway Barry. Chester returns them to normal and Cisco has a tearful reconciliation with Barry and Caitlin. After Bates secures a blimp she can drop money out of to "save people from the system," Barry convinces Bates to stand down and work on Mayor Sampson's economic development committee. Cisco gives all his tech and responsibilities to Chester before the former and Kamilla are given going-away parties. After revealing she is about to close a case, Cecile vows to find a psychic mask manifesting in her reflection.
146	13	"Masquerade"	Rachel Talalay	Sam Chalsen & Christina M. Walker	June 15, 2021	T27.14163	0.76
After revealing gaps in Kramer's past to Joe, Cecile, under the control of Psycho-Pirate's mask's "psychic spirit," sends Barry's consciousness to a mindscape where he finds the real Cecile's consciousness, which had been trapped since the Force Storm two weeks prior. "Psycho-Cecile" tricks Iris, Chester, Caitlin, and Sue into stealing the mask from the Central City Museum, which she uses to gain enhanced psychic powers. She later uncovers DeVoe's hover-chair in order to amplify and feed off of Cecile's powers. In the mindscape, Cecile reveals to Barry that they are in a memory of a psychiatric ward in Texas where she was a patient following her mother's death, which depressed and institutionalized her. Iris and Chester destroy the hover-chair and Cecile overcomes her grief, allowing her and Barry to reclaim their bodies while the mask is confined at A.R.G.U.S. After reuniting with Cecile, Joe reveals Kramer had worked with her enemies and intentionally led her unit into an ambush during Operation Griffin.
147	14	"Rayo de Luz"	Danielle Panabaker	Story by : Jess Carson; Teleplay by : Jonathan Butler & Gabriel Garza	June 22, 2021	T27.14164	0.79
As Barry and Iris go on vacation, Allegra's cousin Esperanza Garcia / Ultraviolet resurfaces to kill a Dr. Olsen, who contributed to turning Ultraviolet into an assassin at the cost of her voice, and attack Allegra to dissuade her from looking for her. Believing that there is some good left in her cousin, Allegra and Sue eventually track Ultraviolet and Olsen to a warehouse, where Allegra unlocks her powers' full potential and defeats Ultraviolet. Olsen is sent to jail while Caitlin, Allegra, and Sue offer to help Ultraviolet and restore her voice using Olsen's research. Meanwhile, Joe offers Kramer his help, but she refuses and threatens to have him arrested. During a second meeting, however, she reveals it was her adoptive brother, Adam Creyke, who led her men into the ambush, though she's blamed herself ever since. She eventually asks Joe to help her find Creyke. Elsewhere, Frost meets with Chillblaine, who claims he has been released from prison for turning state's witness, much to Frost's surprise.
Graphic Novel #4: The Godspeed Imperative
148	15	"Enemy at the Gates"	Geoff Shotz	Story by : Joshua V. Gilbert; Teleplay by : Thomas Pound	June 29, 2021	T27.14165	0.77
Barry dreams about his future daughter Nora West-Allen, leading him to believe Iris is pregnant, so he develops a way to test Iris' hCG levels. Despite Barry wanting to keep it a secret, Cecile and Chester find out. Meanwhile, Frost reluctantly brings Chillblaine to S.T.A.R. Labs after he gets injured in a fight. Suddenly, six modem-speaking Godspeed clones arrive in Central City to target Barry, so Chester creates a translating algorithm and activates S.T.A.R. Labs' defenses. When the clones break in, Chester flees to the Time Vault and has Gideon boost a modem-speak signal to confuse them, allowing Barry, Chillblaine, and Frost to combat them. When one of the clones destroys Gideon, Barry flees into the city with all of the clones pursuing him, but six more appear and attack the first six before all of them disappear to recharge. While recovering, Frost and Chillblaine share a romantic experience until he escapes while Barry learns Iris is not pregnant. Elsewhere, Cecile helps Caitlin remove Esperanza's Black Hole chip and Joe and Kramer are attacked while staking out Creyke's boat.
149	16	"P.O.W."	Marcus Stokes	Kristen Kim & Dan Fisk	July 6, 2021	T27.14166	0.77
Barry dreams about Nora again, who says that her future is in danger. John Diggle later helps Barry trap a Godspeed clone, who reveals that they are searching for the "prime" August Heart, and requests Barry's aid in killing him, but escapes after Barry refuses. Barry decides to go to 2049 to check on Nora, but is knocked out of the Speed Force by Godspeed clones. Barry then finds Deon protecting Iris, who is phasing through temporal planes. Diggle, Cecile, and Frost find an amnesiac Heart, but soon make him remember his identity. Following this, Diggle vows to resolve something he has "been putting off." Meanwhile, after Caitlin treats her, Esperanza requests Allegra's help in stopping other Black Hole remnants, but Allegra refuses. However, Barry's actions prompt Allegra to join Esperanza after all, but Esperanza is then killed. Elsewhere, Joe and Kramer trap their attacker Creyke, who betrayed Kramer and the military as revenge for experiments he endured due to his abilities. Joe stops Kramer from killing Creyke and they arrest him. Afterwards, Nora West-Allen arrives from 2049 alongside Bart, Barry's future son. Barry is relieved, having thought that he had "lost Nora."
150	17	"Heart of the Matter, Part 1"	Eric Dean Seaton	Eric Wallace & Lauren Barnett	July 13, 2021	T27.14167	0.75
Barry allows Bart and Nora to stay in the past and join him in fighting off a squad of Godspeed clones. Later, Barry says that Nora should "rewind time and ignore the family rules," but Nora reveals that she is not the "other Nora," but a different Nora. They target Bart, who considers Godspeed "his Thawne", having witnessed Godspeed murdering Jay Garrick, who had always encouraged Bart. Iris eventually returns. After several losses against the clones, Barry and Iris decide to bench Nora and Bart. However, rebel clones capture Jay in Keystone City while he is recovering his speed and demand Bart in exchange for his life. Bart leaves to fight them, but is knocked out and nearly killed by the clones. Barry and Nora rescue Jay and Bart while Cisco arrives and traps the clones. Meanwhile, Chester asks Allegra for help with charging a device to remove the clones' speed. Elsewhere, Joe and Kramer turn Creyke over to the FBI, but return to witness many of Central City's citizens fleeing to escape the "Godspeed War." Afterwards, Cecile helps Barry enter Heart's mind, where he encounters a version of Heart with his memories.
151	18	"Heart of the Matter, Part 2"	Marcus Stokes	Eric Wallace & Kelly Wheeler	July 20, 2021	T27.14168	0.70
Godspeed demands "organic speed" in exchange for ending the war. The Speed Force reawakens Bart and grants Iris superspeed; they fight the Godspeed clones alongside Team Flash. However, the Speed Force is forced to retreat when the clones begin to feed off of her energy. Allegra arrives with Chester's device and removes the clones' speed. Barry decides to grant Heart's request, restoring his memories. Against Cecile's urging, Heart merges with the clones. Eobard Thawne arrives and incapacitates Heart, making a failed attempt on Barry's life before escaping. Heart is sent to Iron Heights with his memory of Barry's identity removed. Meanwhile, after using superspeed to rescue Joe from an attack, Kramer learns that she is a metahuman with the ability to mimic others' abilities like she did with Creyke and leaves with a new perspective on law enforcement. Barry and Iris renew their wedding vows in front of their friends and family.

== Cast and characters ==
=== Main ===
- Grant Gustin as Barry Allen / The Flash
- Candice Patton as Iris West-Allen
- Danielle Panabaker as Caitlin Snow and Frost
- Carlos Valdes as Cisco Ramon / Mecha-Vibe (Note: Valdes is credited until "Good-Bye Vibrations" and again in the last two episodes.)
- Danielle Nicolet as Cecile Horton
- Kayla Compton as Allegra Garcia
- Brandon McKnight as Chester P. Runk
- Efrat Dor as Eva McCulloch and Mirror Monarch (Note: Only credited for the episodes she appears in.)
- Tom Cavanagh as Harrison Wells (Note: Cavanagh portrays Harrison Wells (Earth-Prime) primarily and Nash Wells, Harry Wells, H. R. Wells, Sherloque Wells, and Orson Wells in a less prominent capacity.) and Eobard Thawne / Reverse-Flash (Note: Only credited for the episodes he appears in and is later credited in the "special guest star" and "special appearance by" bill in "Timeless" and "Heart of the Matter, Part 2" respectively.)
- Jesse L. Martin as Joe West

=== Recurring ===
- Victoria Park as Kamilla Hwang
- Stephanie Izsak as Daisy Korber
- Michelle Harrison as "Nora Allen" / Speed Force and Joan Williams
- Sara Garcia as Alexa Rivera / Fuerza
- Ennis Esmer as Bashir Malik / Psych
- Christian Magby as Deon Owens
- Carmen Moore as Kristen Kramer
- Jon Cor as Mark Blaine / Chillblaine
- Jessica Parker Kennedy as Nora West-Allen / XS

=== Guest ===
- Ashley Rickards as Rosalind Dillon / Top
- Patrick Sabongui as David Singh
- Eric Nenninger as Joseph Carver
- Morena Baccarin as the voice of Gideon (uncredited)
- Natalie Sharp as Millie Rawlins / Sunshine
- Natalie Dreyfuss as Sue Dearbon
- Jessica Hayles as Arielle Atkins
- Nancy Hillis as Penelope Dearbon
- Mark Brandon as Richard Dearbon
- David Dastmalchian as Abra Kadabra
- Milton Barnes as Quincy P. Runk
- Mark Sweatman as Matthew Norvock
- Donny Lucas as Chip Cooper
- Donna Soares as Judge Tanaka
- Deb Podowski as Councillor Strong
- Jona Xiao as Carrie Bates / Rainbow Raider 2.0
- Alexa Barajas Plante as Esperanza Garcia / Ultraviolet (Note: Alexa Barajas plays Esperanza Garcia in "Rayo de Luz", "Enemy at the Gates", and "P.O.W."; Barajas only voices Esperanza in "P.O.W.".)
  - Erika Soto as the voice of Esperanza Garcia / Ultraviolet (Note: Erika Soto voices Ultraviolet in "Rayo de Luz" and "Enemy at the Gates".)
- Jonathon Young as Dr. Olsen
- David Ramsey as John Diggle / Spartan
- Rick D. Wasserman as the voice of the Godspeed Clones
- Julian Black Antelope as Adam Creyke
- Jordan Fisher as Bart Allen / Impulse (Note: Also credited in the 'special appearance by' bill in "P.O.W.".)
- Karan Oberoi as August Heart / Godspeed
- John Wesley Shipp as Jay Garrick / Flash

== Production ==
=== Development ===
On January 7, 2020, The CW renewed the series for a seventh season. At San Diego Comic-Con 2019, series star Grant Gustin implied it could be the final season as none of the actors were contracted for beyond seven seasons. However, the show was later renewed by The CW on February 3, 2021, confirming that it would continue with at least an eighth season.

=== Writing ===
The sixth season ended prematurely, with 19 episodes out of the scheduled 22 due to the COVID-19 pandemic. Showrunner Eric Wallace said the remaining three episodes, which had been written, would become the first three episodes of season seven. He conceded there may be a few small adjustments made based on how the pandemic would affect shooting, but said Eva McCulloch's story "is on a very specific trajectory that we want to honor and finish." Wallace continued that he thought having these three episodes start season seven was "making it stronger because it's forcing us to look at these two separate things – which is the end of Eva's story and the beginning of the next villain's story and how he relates to Barry and Iris —" and making a strong connection between them. While cast member Danielle Panabaker was initially written out of some episodes in the season to accommodate her maternity leave since she gave birth in April 2020, Wallace said there had been discussions about whether to write her back into them since the pandemic resulted in production delays, though he noted the rewriting process was "tricky". Like the sixth season, the seventh season would be divided into multiple "Graphic Novel" arcs, though Wallace said they were "not going to be broken up in the way I think folks expect." The "Graphic Novels" are known as the third and fourth graphic novels, continuing from season six. Wallace said all four would be connected as he was planning to tell "one big story" over season six and seven. "Reflections and Lies", the second "Graphic Novel" of season six, ends with the third episode of season seven.

Regarding the character of Ralph Dibny / Elongated Man, given actor Hartley Sawyer's firing from the show, Wallace said they would be giving the character "a rest for while. But we will leave the door open" for a version of the character to appear again. Given Dibny's powers allow him to alter his appearance, Wallace stated that it created "a couple of ways" for Dibny to "still appear in at least one episode this season to wrap that storyline up, that gets us what we need and still allows fans to say goodbye to the character, at least for the indefinite future." Wallace also revealed they had a planned storyline for Dibny with another character that would have tied into the season's main villain. As a result, another character was utilized for that storyline and Wallace said "the storyline became so much stronger" because it became more of an emotional journey for them, going "somewhere that we never imagined they would until many seasons down the line". Despite setting up the relationship between Dibny and Sue Dearbon, Dearbon would still appear in the season, assisting Team Flash "in an unexpected way". Wallace later said that Joe West's storyline in the season would be "inspired by societal changes happening in today's world".

=== Casting ===
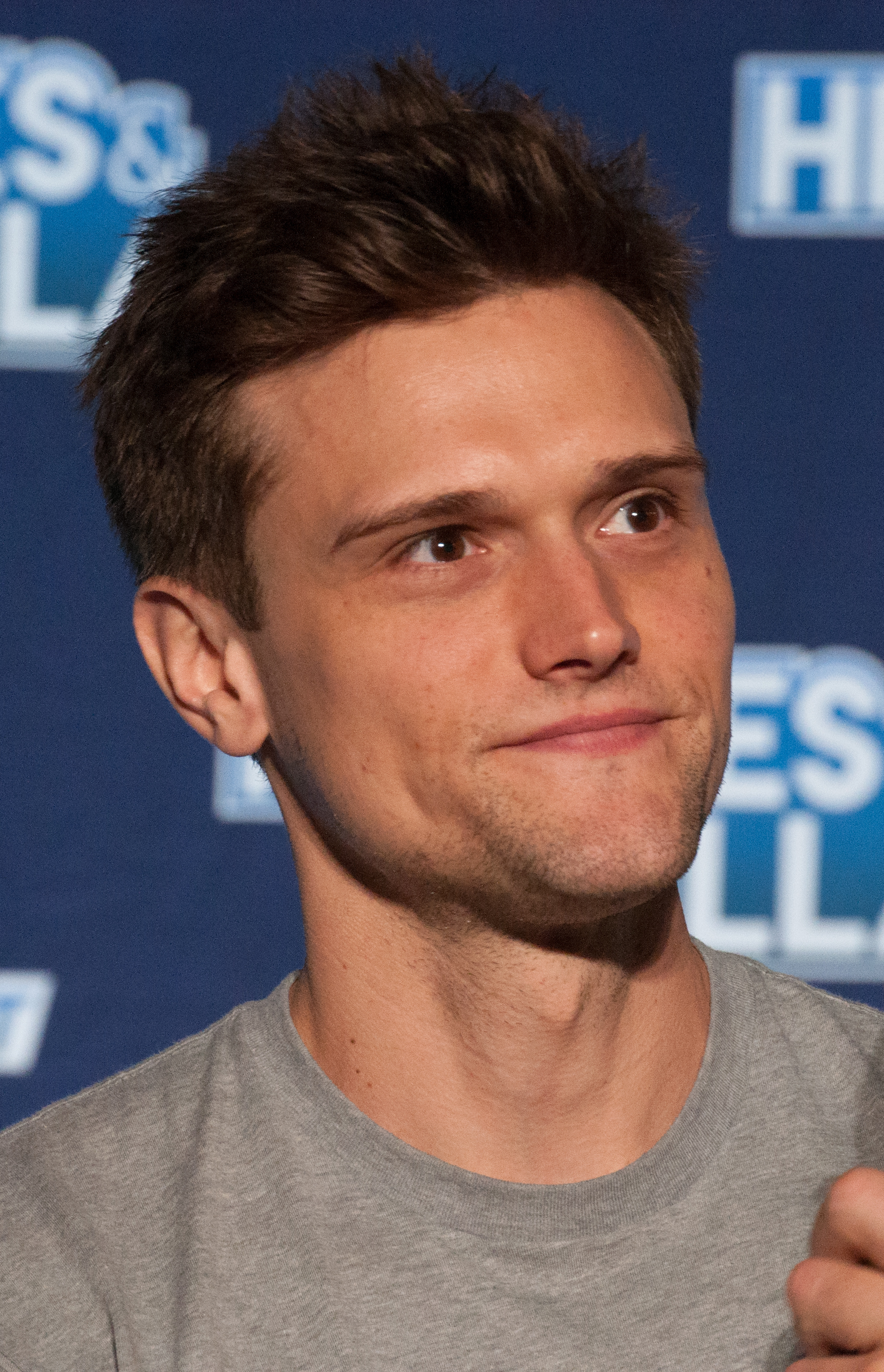
Hartley Sawyer was fired by The CW after his past social media posts with racist and misogynistic references resurfaced in the wake of the George Floyd protests. The decision was met with both praise and backlash, with some accusing the CW of supporting cancel culture.

Main cast members Grant Gustin, Candice Patton, Danielle Panabaker, Carlos Valdes, Danielle Nicolet, Efrat Dor and Jesse L. Martin return as Barry Allen / The Flash, Iris West-Allen, Caitlin Snow / Frost, Cisco Ramon, Cecile Horton, Eva McCulloch, and Joe West. Tom Cavanagh, in addition to returning as Nash Wells, also plays Harry Wells, H. R. Wells, Sherloque Wells, Earth-1 Wells and Eobard Thawne / Reverse-Flash. Brandon McKnight, who plays Chester P. Runk, was promoted to the main cast on March 3, 2020, while Kayla Compton, who plays Allegra Garcia, was promoted to the main cast two days later, on March 5, 2020. Hartley Sawyer was expected to return as Ralph Dibny / Elongated Man in the season, but on June 8, 2020, he was fired from the series after his past social media posts with racist and misogynistic references resurfaced in the wake of the George Floyd protests. Sawyer's character eventually made his appearance in the third episode "Mother", portrayed by an uncredited actor. On December 1, 2020, David Ramsey was revealed to be reprising his Arrow role of John Diggle in the season. On January 13, 2021, Jon Cor was cast in a guest role as Mark Stevens / Chillblaine for the seventh season. On March 30, 2021, Jordan Fisher was cast in a recurring role as Bart Allen / Impulse. On May 4, 2021, it was announced that Cavanagh and Valdes would leave the series after the season concludes. It was originally planned for Cavanagh to leave after season six, but he remained to properly conclude his characters' storyline in the seventh season's first three episodes; he is credited as a special guest star for his later appearances. In the same month, it was revealed that Jessica Parker Kennedy and John Wesley Shipp would be reprising their roles as Nora West-Allen / XS and Jay Garrick.

=== Filming ===
The episode that would have been season six's 20th was 90% filmed before being announced as the season seven premiere. The season was scheduled to begin filming on October 1, 2020. However, by September 29, the start of filming was indefinitely delayed because of delays in receiving COVID-19 test results for the cast and crew. Filming eventually began on October 9. On November 29, filming was suspended following a member of the production testing positive for COVID-19, and resumed by mid-December at Cloverdale. Filming concluded on May 22, 2021.

== Marketing ==
In early August 2020, The CW released several posters of the Arrowverse superheroes wearing face masks, including the Flash, with all posters having the caption "Real Heroes Wear Masks". This marketing tactic was used to "raise public awareness on the efficacy of facial coverings preventing the spread of COVID-19." In early December 2020, the titles for the first five episodes of the season were revealed.

== Release ==
=== Broadcast ===
The seventh season premiered on March 2, 2021, delayed from its previous date of February 23, 2021. Despite premiering much later than previous seasons, it was not expected to have a much shorter episode count. In September 2020, Wallace said the number of episodes for the season had not yet been decided, and that would depend on when the season would begin filming safely. On May 25, 2021, it was confirmed that the season 7 finale would be on July 20, and that the season would have only 18 episodes.

== Reception ==
=== Ratings ===
Viewership and ratings per episode of The Flash season 7
No.	Title	Air date	Rating (18–49)	Viewers (millions)	DVR (18–49)	DVR viewers (millions)	Total (18–49)	Total viewers (millions)
1	"All's Wells That Ends Wells"	March 2, 2021	0.3	1.00	0.3	0.93	0.6	1.93
2	"The Speed of Thought"	March 9, 2021	0.3	0.99	0.3	0.75	0.6	1.74
3	"Mother"	March 16, 2021	0.2	0.98	—N/a	—N/a	—N/a	—N/a
4	"Central City Strong"	March 23, 2021	0.2	0.98	—N/a	—N/a	—N/a	—N/a
5	"Fear Me"	March 30, 2021	0.2	0.91	—N/a	—N/a	—N/a	—N/a
6	"The One With The Nineties"	April 6, 2021	0.3	0.97	0.2	0.66	0.5	1.62
7	"Growing Pains"	April 13, 2021	0.3	0.89	0.3	0.71	0.6	1.60
8	"The People V. Killer Frost"	May 4, 2021	0.2	0.74	0.2	0.66	0.4	1.39
9	"Timeless"	May 11, 2021	0.2	0.74	0.3	0.73	0.5	1.47
10	"Family Matters, Part 1"	May 18, 2021	0.2	0.67	0.2	0.52	0.4	1.19
11	"Family Matters, Part 2"	May 25, 2021	0.1	0.64	0.3	0.68	0.4	1.32
12	"Good-Bye Vibrations"	June 8, 2021	0.2	0.74	0.2	0.60	0.4	1.35
13	"Masquerade"	June 15, 2021	0.2	0.76	0.2	0.48	0.3	1.24
14	"Rayo de Luz"	June 22, 2021	0.2	0.79	0.2	0.56	0.4	1.34
15	"Enemy at the Gates"	June 29, 2021	0.2	0.77	0.2	0.49	0.3	1.26
16	"P.O.W."	July 6, 2021	0.2	0.77	0.2	0.56	0.4	1.32
17	"Heart of the Matter, Part 1"	July 13, 2021	0.2	0.75	0.2	0.56	0.4	1.30
18	"Heart of the Matter, Part 2"	July 20, 2021	0.2	0.70	0.2	0.58	0.4	1.28

=== Accolades ===
Awards and nominations for The Flash season 6
Year	Award	Category	Nominee(s)	Result	Ref.
2021	People's Choice Awards	The Sci-Fi/Fantasy Show of 2021	The Flash	Nominated	
