= The Return of Sherlock Holmes (disambiguation) =

The Return of Sherlock Holmes is a 1905 collection of 13 Sherlock Holmes stories by Arthur Conan Doyle.

The Return of Sherlock Holmes may also refer to:

- The Return of Sherlock Holmes (1929 film)
- The Return of Sherlock Holmes (1987 film)
- 1994 Baker Street: Sherlock Holmes Returns, a 1993 American television movie
- The Return of Sherlock Holmes (play), 1923
- The second season of the television series Sherlock Holmes
- The 1993 season of the BBC radio series Sherlock Holmes

== See also ==
- Sherlock Holmes (disambiguation)
- The Adventures of Sherlock Holmes (disambiguation)
- Sherlock Holmes and Doctor Watson (disambiguation)
