= The Last Temptation of Barry Allen =

- The Flash episodes
- The ending card for part 1, which is also the title card for part 2
- Episode nos.: Season 6 Episodes 7 and 8
- Directed by: Chad Lowe (part 1); Michael Nankin (part 2)
- Written by: Jonathan Butler (part 1); Gabriel Garza (part 1); Kristen Kim (part 2); Joshua V. Gilbert (part 2)
- Production codes: T27.14007; T27.14008
- Original air dates: November 26, 2019; December 3, 2019

Guest appearances
- Sendhil Ramamurthy as Ramsey Rosso / Bloodwork; Michelle Harrison as Nora Allen; Victoria Park as Kamilla Hwang; Kayla Compton as Allegra Garcia

Episode chronology
← Previous "License to Elongate"	Next → "Crisis on Infinite Earths: Part Three"
- The Flash season 6

"The Last Temptation of Barry Allen" is a two-part story comprising the seventh and eighth episodes of the sixth season of the American television series The Flash, based on the DC Comics character Barry Allen / Flash, a crime scene investigator who gains superhuman speed, which he uses to fight criminals, including others who have also gained superhuman abilities. The series is set in the Arrowverse, sharing continuity with the other television series of the universe, and is a spin-off of Arrow. The first part was written by Jonathan Butler and Gabriel Garza, and directed by Chad Lowe. Part two was written by Kristen Kim and Joshua V. Gilbert, and directed by Michael Nankin.

Grant Gustin stars as Barry, and is joined by principal cast members Candice Patton, Danielle Panabaker, Carlos Valdes, Hartley Sawyer, Danielle Nicolet, Tom Cavanagh, and Jesse L. Martin. The first part, titled "The Last Temptation of Barry Allen, Pt. 1", sees Barry being affected with a hallucinogenic contagion by Ramsey Rosso. The second part, "The Last Temptation of Barry Allen, Pt. 2", revolves around Team Flash's efforts to save Central City from Rosso's army of zombie-like creatures.

The first part premiered in the United States on The CW on November 26, 2019, followed by the second part on December 3, 2019. The episodes received generally positive reviews from critics.

== Plot ==
=== Part 1 ===
During Ralph Dibny's fight with Ramsey Rosso, the latter drains his blood. Killer Frost gets Ralph to S.T.A.R. Labs, where Barry Allen gives him a blood transfusion, where Barry is forced to use his intangibility to penetrate Ralph's elastic skin. However, a trace of Rosso's blood enters Barry's bloodstream, causing him to pass out. The Speed Force, in the form of his mother Nora, tells him that Rosso's blood contains his consciousness and is slowly infecting him as well as grants him access to Barry's mind; including knowledge of his secret identity and impending death. Using his memories against him, Rosso tries to convince Barry to join him; promising him the power to avert not only his death, but countless others, and shows Barry a vision of him using Rosso's blood to save a woman.

The Speed Force tries to dissuade Barry, but accidentally provokes him when he realizes that not only is Rosso able to make good on his request, but that he was its pawn and he will never get what he wants while serving it. However, it is too late to warn him of the consequences, as he phases his hand through its chest. Cisco and Frost eventually revive Barry, but when Iris West-Allen comes to check on him, she quickly realizes it is not him; it is revealed that he has succumbed to Rosso's temptation. Fully infected, Barry attacks his friends and reports to Rosso, who is ready to enact his masterstroke and calls himself "Bloodwork." Elsewhere, Iris, Kamilla Hwang, and Allegra Garcia investigate the organization that turned Esperanza Garcia into a killer. They learn the group's name, Maelstrom, but their only other lead is mysteriously killed.

=== Part 2 ===
With Barry under his control, Rosso attacks Central City and converts most of its citizens into zombie-like creatures. Cisco and Iris argue over how to save Barry and stop Rosso, but both of their plans fail. However, Rosso chooses not to convert them in favor of enacting the final phase of his plan; taking the Particle Accelerator in S.T.A.R. Labs to spread his blood across all of Central City. As he makes his way inside, Cisco and Iris realize that during their last encounter, Barry used his connection to Rosso to save them and secretly tell them how to beat him. Using a combination of Rosso's blood, the particle accelerator, and Allegra's powers, Team Flash subvert Rosso's plan to cure Central City of his influence.

With his plan foiled, Rosso transforms into a blood monster to kill the Flash and begin anew, only to be distracted by a hallucination of his mother induced by Barry long enough for the speedster to trap him in Chester P. Runk's prison. With Rosso remanded to A.R.G.U.S.'s custody, Team Flash spend their last moments before the upcoming Crisis together just as red skies loom over them. Meanwhile, Nash Wells uncovers a wall of symbols before a blinding light pulls him inside.

== Production ==
=== Development and writing ===
Showrunner Eric Wallace explained the title of the two-part episode as being about Ramsey Rosso / Bloodwork tempting Barry Allen / Flash: "And what's great about his character is he has a really good point of view that when you hear it, I think next week, it's insane--but it makes sense. And that's what's tempting to Barry". Sendhil Ramamurthy, who portrays Rosso, said the first part "is more about one long conversation between Ramsey and Barry, about their particular circumstances and why they find themselves in this situation." He also did not believe Rosso went "too far" as Bloodwork because "anything is worth living. Anything is worth not having to experience the pain that he went through losing his mother", but believed the character could be redeemed.

=== Casting ===
Main cast members Grant Gustin, Candice Patton, Danielle Panabaker, Carlos Valdes, Hartley Sawyer, Tom Cavanagh and Jesse L. Martin appear in the episodes as Barry Allen / Flash, Iris West-Allen, Caitlin Snow / Killer Frost, Cisco Ramon, Ralph Dibny / Elongated Man, Nash Wells and Joe West, respectively. The guest cast for the episodes include Sendhil Ramamurthy as Ramsey Rosso / Bloodwork, Michelle Harrison as the Speed Force in the form of Nora Allen, Victoria Park as Kamilla Hwang, and Kayla Compton as Allegra Garcia.

== Release ==
The first part aired in the United States on The CW on November 26, 2019, and concluded with part two on December 3. Part one became available for streaming on Netflix in Canada on November 28, while part two became available on December 5. It was first aired in the United Kingdom on Sky One on December 3 for first part and on December 10 for the second part.

== Reception ==
=== Ratings ===
Viewership and ratings per episode of The Last Temptation of Barry Allen
No.	Title	Air date	Rating/share (18–49)	Viewers (millions)	DVR (18–49)	DVR viewers (millions)	Total (18–49)	Total viewers (millions)
1	"The Last Temptation of Barry Allen, Pt. 1"	November 26, 2019	0.4/2	1.17	0.5	1.30	1.1	2.32
2	"The Last Temptation of Barry Allen, Pt. 2"	December 3, 2019	0.5/3	1.32	0.5	1.23	1.0	2.31

=== Critical response ===
==== Part 1 ====
The review aggregator website Rotten Tomatoes reported an 88% approval rating for the episode, based on 8 reviews, with an average rating of 8.07/10. Scott Von Doviak of The A.V. Club noted, "Barry's dark night of the soul unfolds, director Chad Lowe brings an unsettling, nightmarish quality to the proceedings ... There's some haunting imagery along the way, including a graveyard populated by the casualties of The Flash since the very beginning, but it's the sound design that really gets under the skin: a combination of chimes, whooshing noises, and burbling arcade music straight out of Logan's Run unlike anything the series has done before." Bleeding Cool praised the episode's final climax scene, saying about it "It's such an effective and powerful moment with massive payoff in the final moments of the episode when you realize what has happened." On the subject of the episode, TVLine said "Team Flash for a fleeting moment thought Barry fended off Ramsey's takeover. But with a final, very unsettling button on his performance, Gustin added just enough coldness to tip off Iris, and us, that the beloved Barry had in fact lost."

Chancellor Agard of Entertainment Weekly noted that in the episode, "[Gustin] flexed even harder in an emotional and torturous episode that saw Barry Allen torn between life and death. This may be one of Gustin's best turns on the show yet." In the review, Agard also praised Gustin's performance in the first part, saying "Gustin's pained performance throughout the entire episode, especially in his confrontation with the Speed Force, definitely helps sell this dark turn, too." In a Den of Geek review written by Mike Cecchini, the author also praising Gustin's acting, saying "is a showcase for Gustin, allowing him to dig into some of Barry's most human and imperfect thoughts and impulses for almost the entirety of its runtime as he comes to turn with his impending death. Gustin has to carry much of the episode and it's really great work, especially considering how at its heart, this is a simple "battle for our hero's soul" story."

Also writing a review for the episode, Craig Byrne of IGN stated "["Part 1"] starts with a fun sequence picking up exactly where last week's episode left off, giving us a Bloodwork vs. Elongated Man confrontation that features some impressive stretching effects and clever things done with said effects. This is the world that The Flash lives in, and these kinds of confirmations are reminders of the things I like about the show—straight-up superhero action," also saying "Ultimately, this episode gets a lot better when the story starts teeing up what is sure to be next week's more thrilling "Part 2" conclusion" Screen Rant continued to praise Gustin's performance, calling "The Last Temptation of Barry Allen, Part 1" one of the series' best episodes overall. The writer of the review, Andy Behbakht, said "From every scene where he goes from scared to angry, hopeful to doubtful and, ultimately, determined to broken, Gustin gets to own the spotlight in a new refreshing way. Despite the first part of the mid-season finale having other strong arcs, Barry's internal battle is what makes the episode stand out as one of The Flash's strongest hours ever."

==== Part 2 ====
Rotten Tomatoes reported an 78% approval rating for the episode, based on 9 reviews, with an average rating of 7.78/10. The A.V. Club praised the two-parter episode's ending, saying "The scene strikes a nostalgic note, with Cisco and Caitlin reminiscing about the early good times before all the doppelgangers and time-travel shenanigans made everything complicated. Maybe this Crisis On Infinite Earths will serve the purpose the original comics version was supposed to accomplish thirty-five years ago: simplify everything and bring it back to the basics." Entertainment Weekly compared the episode's tone and themes to the previous one, saying "The episode wastes no time in re-establishing the scary tone from the first part. When Cisco, Iris, and Frost come to in S.T.A.R. Labs, Cisco immediately turns on the Babel Protocol, which he developed in case the Flash ever went bad, and covers the entire building in a forcefield. At the same time, director Michael Nankin employs a few quick shots of terrified Central City citizens running away from Ramsey Bloodwork's zombie army that effectively establish how dire the crisis is and make it feel like a citywide threat."

Mike Cecchini, who also wrote the review for the first part of the episode, complemented the dynamics between different character duos, saying "just about as tense as we've ever seen Cisco, and he repeatedly proved Barry's faith in him right. It's no accident that so much of the episode's drama came from Cisco and Iris working together, Barry's two best friends facing a dire threat to the person they love the most. With Caitlin and Frost mostly busy elsewhere, and of course Grant Gustin getting a break from dialogue and big character moments after his showcase in part one, Carlos Valdes and Candice Patton were the real stars of this week's episode, a perfect counterbalance to the first part's deep dive into Barry's brain." TV Fanatic criticized the Negative Flash storyline, saying "Unfortunately, Negative Flash was a let down. Since ["The Last Temptation of Barry Allen, Part 2"] is the episode before Crisis, we knew Ramsey had to be dealt with quickly. However, Negative Flash did no more than giving us creepy smiles and follow Ramsey around. After all that build-up, you'd think there would be something bigger in store for Negative Flash."

Craig Byrne of IGN criticized the Ramsey Rosso character, saying "With that said, the final Bloodwork vs. Flash confrontation looks very cool, and our last moments with Ramsey Rosso — where Barry gets into his head the same way he had done with Barry and bringing in someone from Ramsey's past—finally gives us that sympathetic feeling missing in the rest of the season. But it's a bit too late, despite my liking Ramamurthy as an actor." Andy Wilson of Bleeding Cool praised the dynamic and relationships of Barry and Iris in the episode, saying "The success of the episode comes down to the relationship between Barry and Iris (Candice Patton). Patton continues her excellent work as the real glue that binds Team Flash together. There's also a real pathos to her performance, knowing full well these are some of the last hours she will spend with her husband before he disappears."
