= The Adventures of Sherlock Holmes (disambiguation) =

The Adventures of Sherlock Holmes is a collection of short stories by Sir Arthur Conan Doyle.

The Adventures of Sherlock Holmes may also refer to:

== Film ==
- Adventures of Sherlock Holmes; or, Held for Ransom, a 1905 silent film
- The Adventures of Sherlock Holmes, a 1921 silent film series
- The Adventures of Sherlock Holmes (film), a 1939 film

== Radio ==
- The Adventures of Sherlock Holmes (1930 radio series), an NBC radio series which aired from 1930 to 1935
- The New Adventures of Sherlock Holmes, a radio series which aired from 1939 to 1950, first on the Blue Network and later on Mutual
- The Adventures of Sherlock Holmes (1954 radio series), a British-American co-production

== Television ==
- The Adventures of Sherlock Holmes (1954 TV series)
- The Adventures of Sherlock Holmes (1984 TV series)
- The Adventures of Sherlock Holmes and Dr. Watson, a 1979-1986 Soviet TV series

== Other ==
- Sherlock Holmes (video game series), series of adventure games developed by Frogwares

== See also ==
- Sherlock Holmes (disambiguation)
- Sherlock Holmes and Doctor Watson (disambiguation)
- The Return of Sherlock Holmes (disambiguation)
