= Sherlock Holmes (disambiguation) =

Sherlock Holmes is a character created by Sir Arthur Conan Doyle.

Sherlock Holmes may also refer to:

== Film ==
- Sherlock Holmes (1916 film), starring William Gillette
- Sherlock Holmes (Stoll film series), starring Eille Norwood
- Sherlock Holmes (1922 film), starring John Barrymore
- Sherlock Holmes (1931 film series), starring Arthur Wontner
- Sherlock Holmes (1932 film), starring Clive Brook
- The Grey Lady (film), also known as Sherlock Holmes, a 1937 German mystery film
- Sherlock Holmes (1939 film series), starring Basil Rathbone and Nigel Bruce
  - The Adventures of Sherlock Holmes (film), also known in the UK as Sherlock Holmes
- Sherlock Holmes (2009 film), starring Robert Downey, Jr. and Jude Law
  - Sherlock Holmes (soundtrack), the soundtrack album
- Sherlock Holmes (2010 film), a direct-to-DVD film starring Ben Syder and Gareth David-Lloyd

== Television ==
- Sherlock Holmes (1951 TV series), a BBC production starring Alan Wheatley
- Sherlock Holmes (1954 TV series), an American production, filmed in France, starring Ronald Howard
- Sherlock Holmes (1965 TV series), a British production with Peter Cushing and Douglas Wilmer portraying Holmes in different years
- Sherlock Holmes (1967 TV series), a German production starring Erich Schellow
- Sherlock Holmes (1968 TV series), an Italian production starring Nando Gazzolo
- Sherlock Holmes (1984 TV series), a British production starring Jeremy Brett
- Sherlock Holmes (2013 TV series), a Russian television adaptation
- Sherlock Holmes (2014 TV series), a 2014 Japanese puppetry TV series written by Koki Mitani

== Other uses ==
- Sherlock Holmes (play), an 1899 play written by and starring William Gillette
- Sherlock Holmes of Baker Street, a 1962 novel by William S. Baring-Gould
- Sherlock Holmes (video game series), a series started in 2002
- Sherlock Holmes: The Unauthorized Biography, a 2005 novel by Nick Rennison
- The Sherlock Holmes, a public house in Northumberland Street, London

== See also ==
- Adaptations of Sherlock Holmes
- Sherlock (disambiguation)
- Sherlock Holmes and Doctor Watson (disambiguation)
- The Adventures of Sherlock Holmes (disambiguation)
- The Return of Sherlock Holmes (disambiguation)
