= The Flash season 6 =

The Flash
- Season 6
- Promotional poster
- Showrunner: Eric Wallace
- Starring: Grant Gustin; Candice Patton; Danielle Panabaker; Carlos Valdes; Hartley Sawyer; Danielle Nicolet; LaMonica Garrett; Tom Cavanagh; Jesse L. Martin; Efrat Dor
- No. of episodes: 19

Release
- Original network: The CW
- Original release: October 8, 2019 – May 12, 2020

Season chronology
- ← Previous; Season 5 Next → Season 7

The sixth season of the American television series The Flash, which is based on the DC Comics character Barry Allen / Flash, premiered on The CW on October 8, 2019. The season follows Barry as he navigates through the Crisis and the emergence of Ramsey Rosso and Eva McCulloch. It is set in the Arrowverse, sharing continuity with the other television series of the universe, and is a spin-off of Arrow. The season is produced by Berlanti Productions, Warner Bros. Television, and DC Entertainment, with Eric Wallace as showrunner.

The season was ordered in January 2019, and was originally planned to have 22 episodes. Filming began that July, and production was shut down in March 2020 due to the COVID-19 pandemic, leaving the season with only 19 episodes. Grant Gustin stars as Barry, with principal cast members Candice Patton, Danielle Panabaker, Carlos Valdes, Hartley Sawyer, Danielle Nicolet, Tom Cavanagh, and Jesse L. Martin also returning from previous seasons, while LaMonica Garrett was promoted to series regular from his guest status in season five. They are joined by new cast member Efrat Dor while former series regular Keiynan Lonsdale makes a guest appearance. This is the last season to feature Sawyer as a series regular. The series was renewed for a seventh season on January 7, 2020.

== Episodes ==
The Flash season 6 episodes
No. overall	No. in season	Title	Directed by	Written by	Original release date	Prod. code	U.S. viewers (millions)
Graphic Novel #1: Blood and Truth
115	1	"Into the Void"	Gregory Smith	Eric Wallace & Kelly Wheeler	October 8, 2019	T27.14001	1.62
Moments after losing their daughter Nora West-Allen, Barry Allen and Iris West-Allen find her message destroyed. Four months later, they have seemingly come to terms with what happened, but their friends are not convinced. While recovering Nora's discarded suit at the junkyard, Iris is nearly pulled into a black hole. Her investigation into what caused it leads her to Chester P. Runk, who built a machine to open black holes but wound up catatonic after half of his consciousness was absorbed into one. Even worse, the black hole opens over Central City, much larger than before. Using tech from Nora's back-up gauntlet, Barry dives into the black hole, retrieves Chester's consciousness, and puts it back into him, restoring him and closing the black hole. Meanwhile, Caitlin Snow helps her personality Frost learn how to live her own life and tries to dissuade her colleague Ramsey Rosso from using dark matter to cure his patients. Rosso ignores Caitlin's warnings and tests his cure on himself, only to exhibit metahuman powers. Elsewhere, Barry and Iris learn that the Monitor destroyed Nora's message to discourage Barry from changing his fate during the impending "Crisis", as the Flash must die so billions can live.
116	2	"A Flash of the Lightning"	Chris Peppe	Sam Chalsen & Jeff Hersh	October 15, 2019	T27.14002	1.27
Refusing to give up hope, Barry decides to time travel to the day after he disappeared to find out what really happens during the Crisis. However, an anti-matter barrier prevents him from getting there. After suffering a unique wound, he travels to Earth-3 to see Jay Garrick and his wife, Joan Williams. Using a machine Jay built, they send Barry's mind through the anti-matter wall, causing him to see billions of timelines where the multiverse is destroyed and one where he dies saving it. The experience leaves him unsure of what to do, though Joe West later reassures him his death is not a sign that he gave up. Meanwhile, Cecile Horton takes on a case involving young meta Allegra Garcia. The former's empathetic powers tell her Allegra is innocent, so Cecile asks she be released. However, Allegra turns up at a crime scene having seemingly killed someone. Even in spite of Joe's skepticism, Cecile still believes Allegra is innocent. Just then, Allegra's meta cousin, Esperanza, attacks CCPD to kill her. Barry defeats her and clears Allegra's name. Following this, Cecile decides to become a defense attorney for metahumans. Elsewhere, Rosso continues to learn more about his powers.
117	3	"Dead Man Running"	Sarah Boyd	Lauren Barnett & Thomas Pound	October 22, 2019	T27.14003	1.38
Rosso inadvertently turns gunrunner Mitch Romero into a zombie, leading to the latter attacking and killing his own crew in search of dark matter to strengthen himself. Barry and Frost investigate, though the former also works to help her learn how to go on without him following the Crisis and how to live her life to the fullest. Using Caitlin's memories, Frost immediately suspects and tracks down Rosso, whom Barry convinces to help. Though Rosso nearly steals dark matter while at S.T.A.R. Labs, Barry persuades him not to, bonding over their borrowed time after Rosso reveals he is dying of HLH, the disease which took his mother. Romero gets inside S.T.A.R. Labs, where Rosso learns he can control him prior to Barry and Frost overdosing Romero on dark matter to destroy him. Meanwhile, Iris and Cisco Ramon briefly encounter adventurer Harrison Nash Wells, who has come to Earth-1 in search of a substance called "eternium." Ultimately, Barry and Iris come clean with Team Flash about the former's fate in the Crisis while Rosso discovers he can manipulate the blood-like substance Romero produced and use it in his cure, quickly developing a desire for more.
118	4	"There Will Be Blood"	Marcus Stokes	Lauren Certo & Sterling Gates	October 29, 2019	T27.14004	1.48
While Rosso steals more blood for his cure, flashbacks show how he once cared for his mother before she was diagnosed with HLH and how he became upset with her for apparently giving up before she died. While Team Flash processes what Barry and Iris told them, Cisco refuses to accept it and vows to save him. In response, Barry decides to train Cisco to become the new leader of Team Flash after he is gone by working with him to save Rosso. Nash appears and offers his assistance in exchange for a "crypto-circuit" he claims only Cisco can build. The three raid McCulloch Technologies for a regenerating serum, though Cisco pockets it to save Barry instead and claims it was sold off. Barry later finds out and they have a falling out. Barry gives the serum to Rosso, hoping it will save him, but it does not work, causing Rosso to realize he needs blood flooded with adrenaline to save himself. He attacks the hospital and kills several people even in spite of the Flash and Frost's arrival before escaping. As Barry vows to stop him, he and Cisco mend their friendship. Elsewhere, Nash tracks the Monitor's movements.
119	5	"Kiss Kiss Breach Breach"	Menhaj Huda	Kelly Wheeler & Joshua V. Gilbert	November 5, 2019	T27.14005	1.19
Barry and Iris go on vacation, leaving Cisco in charge while they are gone. Suddenly, Breacher appears and tells Cisco that Cynthia was murdered by a hacker she was hunting named Echo. Cisco works with Breacher and the Collectors to figure out who Echo really is, only to learn it is seemingly him. Breacher nearly kills Cisco, but ultimately relents and chooses to give him an hour to turn himself in. Upon further investigation, Cisco discovers Echo is actually his Earth-19 doppelgänger, who used their shared face to frame his Earth-1 counterpart. After a confrontation, Cisco manages to trap Echo so the Collectors can arrest him. Breacher apologizes to Cisco as they both realize Cynthia lured Echo to Earth-1 knowing Cisco would be able to bring him to justice. Meanwhile, Rosso offers Caitlin immortality in exchange for joining him, but she declines. He disavows her as a friend and escapes. Elsewhere, Joe tracks Nash in the sewers, but both become trapped in it until Ralph Dibny rescues them. After Team Flash offers to help, Nash reluctantly agrees and tells them he knows how to save Barry from his impending death.
120	6	"License to Elongate"	Danielle Panabaker	Thomas Pound & Jeff Hersh	November 19, 2019	T27.14006	1.29
Ralph follows up on a lead regarding Sue Dearbon, whom he has been searching for since the past summer, in Midway City. Barry asks to come along. While infiltrating a criminal gala, however, Barry tips their hand and arouses the suspicions of the host, Remington Meister, who has allied himself with an escaped Esperanza. While searching for Dearbon, Barry accidentally gets himself and Ralph captured and left to die. However, they escape, defeat Esperanza, and foil Meister's auction, despite not finding Dearbon. Later, Barry holds a press conference to officially recognize Elongated Man as one of Central City's protectors; Ralph and Joe surprise Barry by honouring him, too. Meanwhile, Nash asks Allegra for help, requiring her abilities to illuminate a wall filled with eternium, which will destroy the Earth if struck. Allegra fears that she will turn out like Esperanza, but Nash promises that that will not happen unless she chooses to, so she assents. Elsewhere, Cecile helps Chester get his life back now that his powers have stabilized. After Ralph tells Iris that Esperanza and her mysterious benefactors appeared at the gala, Rosso attacks him.
121	7	"The Last Temptation of Barry Allen"	Chad Lowe	Kristen Kim & Joshua V. Gilbert	November 26, 2019	T27.14007	1.17
122	8	"The Last Temptation of Barry Allen"	Michael Nankin	Jonathan Butler & Gabriel Garza	December 3, 2019	T27.14008	1.32
Despite Ralph's best efforts, Rosso drains his blood. Frost gets Ralph to S.T.A.R. Labs, where Barry gives him a blood transfusion. However, a trace of Rosso's blood enters Barry's bloodstream, causing him to pass out. The Speed Force, in the form of his mother Nora Allen, tells him that Rosso's blood contains his consciousness and is slowly infecting him, as well as granting him access to Barry's mind, including knowledge of his secret identity and impending death. Using his memories against him, Rosso tries to convince Barry to join him, promising him the power to avert not only his death, but countless others. The Speed Force tries to dissuade Barry, but accidentally provokes him when he surmises he was their pawn and will never get what he wants while serving it. Cisco and Frost eventually revive Barry but, when Iris comes to check on him, she quickly realizes it is not him. Fully infected, Barry attacks his friends and reports to Rosso, who is ready to enact his masterstroke. Elsewhere, Iris, Kamilla, and Allegra investigate the organization that turned Esperanza into a killer. They learn the group's name, Maelstrom, but their only lead is mysteriously killed. With Barry under his control, Rosso attacks Central City and converts most of its citizens into his "Blood Brothers and Sisters." Cisco and Iris disagree over how to save Barry and stop Rosso, but both of their plans fail. However, Rosso chooses not to convert them in favor of enacting the final phase of his plan: taking S.T.A.R. Labs' particle accelerator to spread his blood across all of Central City. As he makes his way inside, Cisco and Iris realize that, during their last encounter, Barry used his connection with Rosso to secretly save them and tell them how to beat Rosso. Using a combination of Rosso's blood, the particle accelerator, and Allegra's powers, Team Flash subverts Rosso's plan and cures Central City of his influence. With his plan foiled, Rosso transforms into a blood monster to kill Barry and begin anew, only to be distracted by a hallucination of his mother long enough for the speedster to trap him in Chester's prison. While Rosso is transferred to A.R.G.U.S.'s custody, Team Flash spend their last moments before Crisis together just as red skies loom over them. Meanwhile, Nash uncovers a wall of symbols before a blinding light pulls him inside.
123	9	"Crisis on Infinite Earths: Part Three"	David McWhirter	Story by : Eric Wallace; Teleplay by : Lauren Certo & Sterling Gates	December 10, 2019	T27.14009	1.73
Ray Palmer's "Paragon Detector" identifies Barry, J'onn J'onzz, and Ivy Town scientist Ryan Choi as the remaining three, so Ralph, Iris, and Ray leave to recruit Choi. After the Monitor restores Cisco's powers, Team Flash and Nash (now Pariah) return to the chamber the latter found and discover an anti-matter cannon and Earth-90's Barry powering it. Cisco frees him, but the cannon starts going critical, so Pariah recruits Black Lightning from another Earth to help contain the energy. As Barry prepares to destroy the cannon, Earth-90 Barry stops him to sacrifice himself in his place. Elsewhere, John Constantine, Mia Smoak, and John Diggle visit Lucifer on Earth-666 to recover Oliver Queen's soul, which they find in Purgatory. Before they can leave, Jim Corrigan appears, wanting to pass the Spectre's power onto Oliver. He accepts and Constantine's team is sent back without him. While the heroes regroup, the Anti-Monitor sends a brainwashed Harbinger to attack them and kill the Monitor so he can finish destroying the multiverse. Before he and the rest of the team is killed, Pariah teleports the Paragons to the Vanishing Point, where they learn Lex Luthor used the Book of Destiny to replace Earth-96's Superman with himself. Note: This episode continues a crossover event that begins on Supergirl season 5 episode 9 and Batwoman season 1 episode 9, continues on Arrow season 8 episode 8, and concludes on Legends of Tomorrow's special episode.
Graphic Novel #2: Reflections and Lies
124	10	"Marathon"	Stefan Pleszczynski	Sam Chalsen & Lauren Barnett	February 4, 2020	T27.14010	1.27
Following Oliver's sacrifice while averting the Crisis, (Note: As depicted in "Crisis on Infinite Earths".) Iris, Allegra, Cecile, and Kamilla Hwang form Team Citizen to investigate McCulloch Technologies and a secret organization called Black Hole. While investigating the former, its CEO Joseph Carver denies any connection to the latter. Despite this and Cecile's legal advice, Iris writes a story on their work, prompting Black Hole to hire metahuman assassin Kimiyo Hoshi to kill her. Meanwhile, Diggle arrives in Central City to return the mask Barry gave Oliver the first time they met. Barry notices traces of Mirakuru serum on it and, believing it contains a warning Oliver left behind regarding a new threat, heads to Lian Yu, where Diggle helps him come to terms with Oliver's death. Back at S.T.A.R. Labs, Team Citizen sets up a trap for Hoshi while Iris blackmails Carver. Under duress, he calls off the bounty and suggests his missing wife Eva McCulloch is involved. While investigating further, Iris is pulled into a mirror. Elsewhere, still reeling from what happened during the Crisis and feeling guilty for taking the metahuman cure beforehand, a newly depowered Cisco decides to leave Team Flash to catalogue all the changes that occurred.
125	11	"Love Is a Battlefield"	Sudz Sutherland	Kelly Wheeler & Jeff Hersh	February 11, 2020	T27.14011	1.13
Barry and Iris' Valentine's Day date is interrupted by Amunet Black, who steals a valuable briefcase containing a mysterious device. The two track Amunet to Ivo Labs, where she is confronted by her ex-boyfriend, Goldface, who then escapes with the device she was attempting to steal. Barry and Iris witness the confrontation before leaving with the device. After a brief argument with Barry over life choices, Iris allies herself with Amunet. Barry later encounters Amunet and Goldface while they are fighting over a Rappaccini's Daughter flower they both want before stopping them by exposing them to its pollen, allowing the two crime lords to reconcile, as well as Barry and Iris. Unbeknownst to him, the Iris that he worked with the entire time is an impostor, as the real one is still trapped in the mirror at McCulloch Tech. Meanwhile, Frost convinces Allegra to reconnect with her ex-boyfriend. After Nash provides additional advice, he sees hallucinations of his doppelgänger, Harry Wells.
126	12	"A Girl Named Sue"	Chris Peppe	Thomas Pound & Lauren Certo	February 18, 2020	T27.14012	1.10
In the mirrorverse, Iris meets Eva, who has been trapped there ever since the particle accelerator knocked her in six years prior. Recalling Sam Scudder, Iris suggests using liquid nitrogen to shatter the mirror so they can escape, but it fails. Distressed, Eva discovers she can control the mirror. Meanwhile, Iris' double asks for the mirror gun, but Barry denies her. She heads to the S.T.A.R. Labs archives to retrieve it, but leaves after bumping into Nash while he was retrieving Harry's journal. Elsewhere, Ralph tracks down Sue, but she claims she cannot go home because she is being targeted by gangster John Loring. Ralph joins forces with her to take down Loring, revealing his secret identity to her in the process. However, Sue double-crosses Ralph to steal a diamond. Loring catches Sue red-handed, but Ralph saves her. Suddenly, Esperanza arrives to kill Sue. The two fight until Sue tricks Esperanza and Ralph in order to escape. Elsewhere, Joe comes to Barry with evidence of a mole inside CCPD, telling him that only family can be trusted. In response, Barry is convinced to give "Iris" the mirror gun. While investigating the diamond, Sue uncovers Black Hole's symbol.
127	13	"Grodd Friended Me"	Stefan Pleszczynski	Kristen Kim & Joshua V. Gilbert	February 25, 2020	T27.14013	1.17
While looking for the cemetery where his parents are buried, Barry finds Hartley Rathaway robbing a jewelry store. Kamilla and Chester provide assistance as the rest of Team Flash is busy, but Hartley escapes. While updating Gideon, Barry accidentally ends up in Grodd's mind while the latter is still in a coma. Grodd tells Barry that, because of the Crisis, he wants to make amends for what he has done and return to Gorilla City to live in peace. Barry does not believe him but, when he tries to escape, he is stopped by the "gatekeeper," a manifestation of Solovar. After Barry reconciles with Grodd, they work together to defeat Solovar while Chester helps separate their minds. Following this, A.R.G.U.S. arranges for Grodd to be released on probation. Meanwhile, Iris and Eva make another attempt to escape the mirrorverse, but the latter burns her arms. When Iris leaves to get bandages, Eva contacts mirror Iris, who suffered the same injuries. Elsewhere, Allegra learns she had a doppelgänger who worked for Nash. When Nash tries to explain himself, he hallucinates another doppelgänger of his, Sherloque Wells, warning him that "he is coming."
128	14	"Death of the Speed Force"	Brent Crowell	Sam Chalsen & Emily Palizzi	March 10, 2020	T27.14014	1.03
Wally West and Cisco return to Central City. The Speed Force is dying and all speedsters will permanently lose their powers in weeks. Barry enters the Speed Force and confirms that this is the result of Oliver enhancing Barry's speed during the Crisis, with the Speed Force expressing understanding of the desperation of the original situation. Meanwhile, metahuman Frida Novikov, who can manipulate time, attempts to exact revenge against those who ruined a past crime spree she committed. Dubbing her "Turtle II", Cisco develops the Velocity-X serum to negate her powers. Aided by Barry and Wally, Joe arrests her. Cisco is then attacked by Eobard Thawne, who took possession of Nash's body, but cannot access his speed, as his host does not have powers. Cecile incapacitates him, allowing Team Flash to imprison him in S.T.A.R. Labs. Thawne still has access to the Negative Speed Force, so Barry gets the idea to create an artificial Speed Force to save himself. Before he leaves, Wally voices his suspicions about Iris to Joe. Elsewhere, Kamilla discovers evidence of mirror Iris' true nature, but the duplicate shoots her with the mirror gun to silence her.
129	15	"The Exorcism of Nash Wells"	Eric Dean Seaton	Lauren Barnett & Sterling Gates	March 17, 2020	T27.14015	1.19
A Mirror Kamilla is created to replace the real one. Joe informs Chief Singh of the CCPD mole, but receives skepticism. Elsewhere, Cisco gives Barry a "Speed Gauge" to monitor his waning powers before building a device to "exorcise" Thawne, who was fused with Nash alongside the other Wellses following the Crisis. While inside Nash's head, Cisco, Cecile, and Barry learn that Thawne is using Nash's traumatic past with Allegra's doppelgänger, Maya, against him. With this knowledge, they help Nash come to terms with her death and expel Thawne. Meanwhile, Eva sends Mirror Iris and Mirror Kamilla to steal a Prismatic Refractor from Mercury Labs, only to find Black Hole operative "Sunshine" beat them to it. They call in Frost and Flash but, despite using Velocity-X, Flash's speed falters and Frost is nearly killed, though CCPD intervenes and forces Sunshine to flee. After "Iris" reminds him of the idea of limits, Barry works with CCPD to trap Sunshine in his lab with the windows shuttered, blocking her powers. While arresting Sunshine, Singh suspects she was the mole because of her powers. Following his experience with Thawne, Barry decides to use his daughter's journal to create his artificial Speed Force while the mirror clones deliver the refractor to Eva.
130	16	"So Long and Goodnight"	Alexandra La Roche	Kristen Kim & Thomas Pound	April 21, 2020	T27.14016	1.09
As Iris acclimates to the mirrorverse, she reveals to Eva that her husband is the Flash, who might be able to save them if they can communicate with him. Eva directs Mirror Iris to ensure Barry loses his speed. Meanwhile, Carver hires Rag Doll to kill Joe. After his car is sabotaged, Singh urges Joe to go into witness protection, but he refuses. Rag Doll attacks Joe, who gets shot when Barry fails to catch all of the bullets. While Joe tries and fails to get evidence on Carver, Rag Doll kidnaps Cecile. Barry battles Rag Doll while Joe rescues Cecile. These incidents convince Joe to take Singh up on his offer, but Singh is revealed to be another of Eva's duplicates. Eva has a mirror sent to Carver to give him one more chance to apologize to her, but he refuses and destroys the mirror. Mirror Iris, furious that Barry failed to protect Joe and that she could not say goodbye to him, kicks Barry out of their apartment. Meanwhile, Ralph and Cisco find Sue robbing Carver's banks, who she claims is blackmailing her parents. She apologizes for manipulating Ralph, but continues to reject his help.
131	17	"Liberation"	Jeff Byrd	Jonathan Butler & Gabriel Garza	April 28, 2020	T27.14017	1.18
Barry becomes suspicious of "Iris" and, with a skeptical Cecile's help, discovers Kamilla's evidence. However, Eva switched his equipment, causing Team Flash to believe he is the imposter and imprison him, though Cecile frees him. The mirror duplicates approach Rosso for his blood in exchange for freeing him, with Mirror Kamilla sacrificing herself to do so. Though Rosso donates his blood, he chooses to remain imprisoned as part of his own plans. Iris discovers Eva's treachery, but gets captured. Mirror Iris gives Eva the blood and wounds a weakened Barry. While watching the battle, Iris taunts Eva with her love for Carver, causing Eva to suffer a mental breakdown and impair Mirror Iris. Barry encourages Mirror Iris to live for herself, but Eva shatters her before stepping out of the mirrorverse and wounding Barry further. Despite his weakened state, Eva chooses to leave and enact her plans instead of killing him. As he heals, Barry and Iris promise to hold on for each other's sakes before the latter searches for Kamilla and Singh. Meanwhile, Cisco and Ralph find Caitlin suffering from a hypothermic reaction due to her fight with Sunshine. Once she counters it, Caitlin decides to visit her mother.
132	18	"Pay the Piper"	Amanda Tapping	Jess Carson	May 5, 2020	T27.14018	1.22
Barry visits Joe to tell him what happened before telling Team Flash about the mirror clones. Following attacks by four non-communicative Godspeed drones throughout the past year, Godspeed himself seemingly attacks so he can drain Barry's speed using thunderous vibrations. Realizing they need a vibrations expert, Barry finds Hartley, who resents him in the post-Crisis timeline after he destabilized his henchman and boyfriend Roderick's molecules years prior. The two reconcile and bond over taking responsibility for their loved ones before learning that Godspeed acquired his drones' speed and has taken hostages. Barry and Hartley join forces to combine their powers and defeat Godspeed. Though they discover it was another drone and that it was sent by someone wanting infinite velocity, they are able to use its "charged sound" to save Roderick. Following this, Cisco becomes inspired to build a perpetual motion machine using Atlantean materials to save their friends from the mirrorverse. Meanwhile, Iris finds Kamilla, but begins to succumb to neural dissonance like Eva did. Ralph helps Frost come to terms with properly meeting Caitlin's mother and Eva prepares to confront her husband.
133	19	"Success Is Assured"	Philip Chipera	Kelly Wheeler & Lauren Barnett	May 12, 2020	T27.14019	1.08
Barry warns Carver about Eva after Mirror Singh destroys Black Hole's warehouse, but he rebuffs him until he learns Eva captured his metas, forcing him to accept. Mirror Singh offers to return Iris in exchange for Carver, but Nash has everyone flee before Barry can answer. Hiding at McCulloch Tech, Ralph discovers that Sue joined Black Hole to kill Carver, so he tries to dissuade her. Having sided with Eva, the Black Hole metas disable the security system and attack. As Nash, Allegra, Ralph, and Sue battle them, Mirror Singh sacrifices himself to get Eva inside and knock out Barry. Despite the Flash's best efforts, Eva kills Carver and takes her company back, though she lets Team Flash go. Eva reveals herself to the public, claiming she was held hostage by a crime syndicate and Carver died saving her. With Carver dead, Sue celebrates her family's freedom until Ralph reveals Eva framed her for his murder. As Joe returns from witness protection, Team Flash plans to rescue their friends from the Mirrorverse while Caitlin departs with her mother for treatment. Meanwhile, Iris is able to concentrate enough to find Singh, but the neural dissonance intensifies until she inexplicably vanishes before Kamilla's eyes.

== Cast and characters ==
=== Main ===
- Grant Gustin as Barry Allen / Flash / Dark Flash
- Candice Patton as Iris West-Allen and Mirror Iris West-Allen
- Danielle Panabaker as Caitlin Snow and Frost
- Carlos Valdes as Cisco Ramon / Vibe (Earth-1) and Cisco Ramon / Echo (Earth-19)
- Hartley Sawyer as Ralph Dibny / Elongated Man
- Danielle Nicolet as Cecile Horton
- LaMonica Garrett (Note: Only credited for his respective episode appearances.) as Mar Novu / Monitor and Anti-Monitor
- Efrat Dor (Note: Only credited for her respective episode appearances.) as Eva McCulloch
- Tom Cavanagh as Harrison Wells (Note: Cavanagh portrays Nash Wells / Pariah primarily and Harry Wells (Earth-2) and Sherloque Wells (Earth-221) in a less prominent capacity.) and Eobard Thawne / Reverse-Flash
- Jesse L. Martin as Joe West

=== Recurring ===
- Sendhil Ramamurthy as Ramsey Rosso / Bloodwork
- Victoria Park as Kamilla Hwang and Mirror Kamilla Hwang
- Kayla Compton as Allegra Garcia and Maya
- Alexa Barajas as Esperanza Garcia / Ultraviolet
- Patrick Sabongui as David Singh and Mirror David Singh

=== Guest ===
- Ryan Handley as Godspeed drone
- Brandon McKnight as Chester P. Runk
- Michelle Harrison as Joan Williams (Earth-3) and Nora Allen
- Morena Baccarin as the voice of Gideon
- Meera Simhan as Rachel Rosso
- John Wesley Shipp as Jay Garrick (Earth-3) and Barry Allen (Earth-90)
- Danny Trejo as Josh / Breacher (Earth-19)
- Carlo Rota as Remington Meister
- Eric Nenninger as Joseph Carver
- Andrew J. Hampton as Maurice
- Emmie Nagata as Dr. Kimiyo Hoshi / Doctor Light
- William MacDonald as Gene Huskk
- Katee Sackhoff as Amunet Black
- Damion Poitier as Goldface
- Natalie Dreyfuss as Sue Dearbon
  - Rebecca Roberts as "January Galore"
- Andy Mientus as Hartley Rathaway / Pied Piper
- David Sobolov as the voice of Gorilla Grodd
- Keith David as the voice of Solovar
- Keiynan Lonsdale as Wally West / Kid Flash
- Vanessa Walsh as Frida Novikov / Turtle II
- Natalie Sharp as Millie Rawlins / Sunshine
- Briana Tedesco as young Maya
- Troy James as Peter Merkel / Rag Doll
  - Phil LaMarr as the voice of Rag Doll
- BD Wong as the voice of Godspeed
- Joel Semande as Roderick Smith
- Mark Brandon as Richard Dearbon
- Nancy Hillis as Penelope Dearbon

==== "Crisis on Infinite Earths" ====
- Jon Cryer as Lex Luthor (Earth-38)
- Matt Ryan as John Constantine
- Stephen Amell as Oliver Queen / Green Arrow
- Caity Lotz as Sara Lance / White Canary
- Brandon Routh as Clark Kent / Superman (Earth-96) and Ray Palmer
- David Ramsey as John Diggle
- Katherine McNamara as Mia Smoak
- Elizabeth Tulloch as Lois Lane (Earth-38)
- David Harewood as J'onn J'onzz / Martian Manhunter
- Tyler Hoechlin as Clark Kent / Superman (Earth-38)
- Cress Williams as Jefferson Pierce / Black Lightning
- Ruby Rose as Kate Kane / Batwoman
- Melissa Benoist as Kara Zor-El / Kara Danvers / Supergirl
- Ashley Scott as Helena Kyle / Huntress (Earth-203)
- Audrey Marie Anderson as Lyla Michaels / Harbinger
- Osric Chau as Ryan Choi
- Stephen Lobo as Jim Corrigan
- Tom Ellis as Lucifer Morningstar (Earth-666)
- Wentworth Miller as the voice of the Leonard A.I. (Earth-74)
- Dina Meyer as Barbara Gordon / Oracle (Earth-203) (Note: These actors were not credited for their appearance.)
- Amanda Pays as Tina McGee (Earth-90) (Note: She appears via archive footage from The Flash (1990))

== Production ==
=== Development ===
The series was renewed for a sixth season by The CW on January 31, 2019, along with a 22-episode order. In March 2019, it was announced that Eric Wallace would replace Todd Helbing as showrunner for the season.

=== Writing ===
The season is split in two halves, each having their own self-contained Big Bad story. Each half is referred to by the producers as a "Graphic Novel", the first one is titled "Blood and Truth", and the second one titled "Reflections and Lies". The split was done to avoid inducing fatigue by keeping one Big Bad for 22 episodes, as previous seasons had done.

Wallace felt episode 19, which became the season finale due to the COVID-19 pandemic halting all production, worked in the series' favor because it had "a big cliffhanger" that was "a good pause point". The remaining three episodes, which had been written, will become the first three episodes of season seven. Wallace conceded there may be a few small adjustments made based on how the pandemic would affect shooting, but said Eva McCulloch's story "is on a very specific trajectory that we want to honor and finish." Wallace continued that he thought having these three episodes start season seven was "making it stronger because it's forcing us to look at these two separate things — which is the end of Eva's story and the beginning of the next villain's story and how he relates to Barry and Iris —" and making a strong connection between them.

=== Casting ===
Main cast members Grant Gustin, Candice Patton, Danielle Panabaker, Carlos Valdes, Hartley Sawyer, Danielle Nicolet and Jesse L. Martin return as Barry Allen / Flash, Iris West-Allen, Caitlin Snow / Frost, Cisco Ramon, Ralph Dibny / Elongated Man, Cecile Horton, and Joe West. Tom Cavanagh also returns as a regular, portraying Nash Wells, another doppelgänger of his character Harrison Wells. Cavanagh also returns as Eobard Thawne / Reverse Flash. Valdes also portrayed Cisco's Earth-19 doppelganger "Echo" in the episode "Kiss Kiss Breach Breach". Sendhil Ramamurthy was cast in a recurring role as Ramsey Rosso / Bloodwork, the Big Bad of the season's first half. Efrat Dor appears as a series regular in the second half of the season as Eva McCulloch.

=== Design ===
The season introduces a new Frost costume which has a more vibrant blue color scheme than the older costume, exposes the shoulders and features a chest emblem shaped like an ice crystal.

=== Filming ===
Production for the season began on July 2, 2019, in Vancouver, British Columbia, and was expected to conclude on April 6, 2020. However, on March 13, 2020, production was shut down due to the COVID-19 pandemic. 90% of the planned 20th episode was filmed by that time, with one more day of filming anticipated to complete it. Though it was initially planned for production on the rest of the season to resume later in the year, the remaining episodes were ultimately not filmed as part of the sixth season.

=== Arrowverse tie-ins ===
At the end of the 2018 Arrowverse crossover "Elseworlds", the follow-up crossover was revealed to be "Crisis on Infinite Earths" based on the comic book of the same name. The crossover took place over five episodes–three (including the Flash episode) in December 2019 and two in January 2020.

== Release ==
=== Broadcast ===
The season premiered on October 8, 2019, in the United States on The CW. It was initially set to run for 22 episodes, but as production on the season could not continue due to the COVID-19 pandemic, the nineteenth episode was later announced as the season finale.

== Reception ==
=== Ratings ===
Viewership and ratings per episode of The Flash season 6
No.	Title	Air date	Rating/share (18–49)	Viewers (millions)	DVR (18–49)	DVR viewers (millions)	Total (18–49)	Total viewers (millions)
1	"Into the Void"	October 8, 2019	0.6/3	1.62	0.5	1.30	1.1	2.92
2	"A Flash of the Lightning"	October 15, 2019	0.5/3	1.27	0.5	1.23	1.0	2.50
3	"Dead Man Running"	October 22, 2019	0.5/3	1.38	0.4	1.07	0.9	2.45
4	"There Will Be Blood"	October 29, 2019	0.5/3	1.48	0.4	1.03	0.9	2.51
5	"Kiss Kiss Breach Breach"	November 5, 2019	0.4/2	1.19	0.4	1.06	0.8	2.25
6	"License to Elongate"	November 19, 2019	0.5/3	1.29	0.4	1.01	0.9	2.30
7	"The Last Temptation of Barry Allen, Pt. 1"	November 26, 2019	0.4/2	1.17	0.5	1.15	0.9	2.32
8	"The Last Temptation of Barry Allen, Pt. 2"	December 3, 2019	0.5/3	1.32	0.4	0.99	0.9	2.31
9	"Crisis on Infinite Earths: Part Three"	December 10, 2019	0.6/4	1.73	0.4	0.98	1.0	2.71
10	"Marathon"	February 4, 2020	0.4	1.27	0.4	0.81	0.8	2.22
11	"Love Is A Battlefield"	February 11, 2020	0.4	1.13	0.4	0.94	0.8	2.07
12	"A Girl Named Sue"	February 18, 2020	0.4	1.10	0.3	0.84	0.7	1.95
13	"Grodd Friended Me"	February 25, 2020	0.4	1.17	0.3	0.81	0.7	1.98
14	"Death of the Speed Force"	March 10, 2020	0.3	1.03	0.4	0.91	0.7	1.94
15	"The Exorcism of Nash Wells"	March 17, 2020	0.4	1.19	0.3	0.85	0.7	2.04
16	"So Long and Goodnight"	April 21, 2020	0.4	1.09	0.3	0.85	0.7	1.94
17	"Liberation"	April 28, 2020	0.4	1.18	0.3	0.82	0.7	2.00
18	"Pay the Piper"	May 5, 2020	0.4	1.22	0.3	0.85	0.7	2.07
19	"Success Is Assured"	May 12, 2020	0.4	1.08	0.3	0.82	0.7	1.90

=== Critical response ===
The review aggregator website Rotten Tomatoes reported an 85% approval rating for the sixth season with an average rating of 6.89/10, based on 92 reviews.

=== Accolades ===
Awards and nominations for The Flash season 6
Year	Award	Category	Nominee(s)	Result	Ref.
2020	Kids' Choice Awards	Favorite Family TV Show	The Flash	Nominated	
2020	BMI Film, TV & Visual Media Awards	BMI Network Television Music Award	Nathaniel Blume and Blake Neely	Won	
2020	People's Choice Awards	The Sci-Fi/Fantasy Show of 2020	The Flash	Nominated	
2021	Critics' Choice Super Awards	Best Actor in a Superhero Series	Grant Gustin	Nominated	
2021	Critics' Choice Super Awards	Best Superhero Series	The Flash	Nominated	
2021	Saturn Awards	Best Superhero Television Series	The Flash	Nominated	
2021	Saturn Awards	Best Actor on a Television Series	Grant Gustin	Nominated	
2021	Saturn Awards	Best Actress on a Television Series	Candice Patton	Nominated	
2021	Saturn Awards	Best Supporting Actress on a Television Series	Danielle Panabaker	Won	
2021	Leo Awards	Best Visual Effects in a Dramatic Series	Armen V. Kevorkian Joshua Spivack, Shirak Agresta, Christopher Grocock, and Marc Lougee (for "Grodd Friended Me")	Won	
2021	Leo Awards	Best Stunt Coordination in a Dramatic Series	Jonathan Kralt (for "Death of the Speed Force")	Nominated	
