= Young Sherlock =

Sherlock Holmes is a character created by Sir Arthur Conan Doyle.

Young Sherlock may refer to:

== Film ==
- Young Sherlock Holmes, a 1985 American mystery adventure film directed by Barry Levinson

== Novels ==
- Young Sherlock Holmes (books), a young adult book series by Andy Lane

== Television ==
- Young Sherlock: The Mystery of the Manor House, an 8-episode television series produced by Granada Television
- Young Sherlock (Chinese TV series), a 2014 Chinese television series about detective Di Renjie
- Young Sherlock (British TV series), a 2026 television series featured on Amazon Prime about the detective based on the book series by Andy Lane

== See also ==
- Sherlock (disambiguation)
