= Holmes and Watson (disambiguation) =

Holmes and Watson may refer to:

== Film ==
- Holmes & Watson. Madrid Days, a 2012 Spanish thriller film
- Holmes & Watson, a 2018 American mystery buddy comedy film

== Theatre ==
- Holmes and Watson, a 2018 play by Jeffrey Hatcher

== See also ==
- Sherlock Holmes and Doctor Watson (disambiguation)
