= Michael Swan =

American film and TV actor (born 1948)

- Born: June 11, 1948 (age 77); San Jose, California, U.S.
- Occupation: Actor
- Years active: 1975–present

Michael Swan (born June 11, 1948) is an American film and TV actor.

== Early life ==
Swan was born in San Jose, California, the son of actress Alys Lucille (née Wilkinson) and Donald Arthur Swan.

== Career ==
Swan started in local theater and was part of an improvisational company in the late 60's known as The Illegitimate Theater. He moved to Los Angeles and worked as a wine consultant at Wally's Liquors in Westwood. Still pursuing an acting career, he studied with David Alexander, a teacher and mentor to actors like Jack Lemmon, Walter Matthau and Ross Martin. He landed recurring roles on Bronk and Medical Center. He made more than 100 Primetime television appearances throughout the 1970s/1980s. He also appeared in several Shakespeare plays at The Will Geer Theatricum Botanicum including 7 seasons as Petruchio in The Taming of the Shrew.

In 1986, Swan landed a contract role on As the World Turns, playing Scottish adventurer Duncan McKechnie for 10 years.

In 1998, Swan joined a second soap opera, The Bold and the Beautiful where he played the role of Adam Alexander, the long-lost ex-husband of Sally Spectra. He appeared as a contract player and as a guest star from 1998 through 2003. Since his soap appearances, Swan has starred in several films by director Roger Corman, appeared in several Primetime shows and has also done commercial work, both in on-camera appearances and in voice-over work. He also played patriarch Daniel Trisk in the PureFlix series Hilton Head Island.

== Filmography ==
=== Film ===
Year	Title	Role	Notes
1980	Inside Moves	Cab Driver	
1986	Friday the 13th Part VI: Jason Lives	Officer Pappas	
2006	Rocker	Bill Smith	
2007	The Wedding Video	Tom	
2008	Midnight Movie	Dr. Wayne	
2009	She Alien	Kryocomm CEO	
2010	Dry Run	Bernie Malt	
2011	Captain America: The First Avenger	Dodgers announcer	
2012	I Love Your Moves	Kiev	
2012	Lizard Man	TV anchor	
2013	Crystal Lake Memories: The Complete History of Friday the 13th	Himself	Documentary film
2016	Attack of the Killer Donuts	Uncle Lucas	
2016	Shadows of the Dead	Dr. Cobb	
2016	Miracle in the Valley	Sheriff Rawles	
2017	Heartbeat	Detective Marsden	
2017	Hope Dances	Yuri	
2021	Barking Mad	Nelson Chadwick	

=== Television ===
Year	Title	Role	Notes
1975	The Blue Knight	Police Officer	Episode: "Pilot"
1975	Babe	Reporter	Television film
1975–1976	Medical Center	Various roles	3 episodes
1975–1976	Bronk	Det. Sgt. Venneman	5 episodes
1976	Police Story	Valley Officer	Episode: "Odyssey of Death: Part 2"
1976	Joe Forrester	Police Officer	Episode: "Squeeze Play"
1976	Marcus Welby, M.D.	Stash	Episode: "All Passions Spent"
1976	Dynasty	Pilot	Television film
1976	The Quest	Actor	Television film
1976	Police Woman	Chaucer	Episode: "The Trick Book"
1976	Executive Suite	Foreman	Episode: "Re: People Who Live in Glass Houses"
1977	The Hardy Boys/Nancy Drew Mysteries	Officer	Episode: "The Disappearing Floor"
1977	Kingston: Confidential	Prison Guard	Episode: "The Rage at Hannibal"
1978	Lucan	Hartley	Episode: "How Do You Run Forever?"
1978	CHiPs	Ed	Episode: "Surf's Up"
1978	The Rockford Files	Cal Morris	Episode: "The Prisoner of Rosemont Hall"
1978	Man from Atlantis	Officer	Episode: "Scavenger Hunt"
1978	Wheels	Designer	Miniseries
1978	Love Is Not Enough	Actor	Television film
1978, 1981	Vegas	Larry / David Lansford	2 episodes
1979	The Girl Who Saved the World	Jack Schoengarth	Television film
1979	Cliffhangers	Jack Schoengarth	11 episodes
1979, 1980	The Incredible Hulk	Turner / Luke	2 episodes
1980	The Chisholms	Tolliver	Episode: "Chains"
1980	Hagen	Joel Trent	Episode: "The Straw Man"
1980	Galactica 1980	Deputy Collins	Episode: "The Super Scouts: Part 2"
1981	Falcon Crest	Richard Channing	Episode: "The Vintage Years"
1983	M*A*S*H	Lt. Brannum	Episode: "As Time Goes By"
1983	Voyagers!	Copilot Mike Dorfman	Episode: "All Fall Down"
1983	Trapper John, M.D.	Attendant	Episode: "Friends in High Places"
1983	V	Officer Bob Briggs	2 episodes
1983	The A-Team	Trigg	Episode: "The Beast from the Belly of a Boeing"
1983	Days of Our Lives	Frank Royce	Episode #1.4521
1983	T. J. Hooker	Peterson	Episode: "Carnal Express"
1983	Simon & Simon	Omar	Episode: "The Bare Facts"
1983–1984	Hardcastle and McCormick	Joey Morgan / Tony Rothman	3 episodes
1984	Matt Houston	Casey	Episode: "Cash and Carry"
1984	Riptide	Ridderhouse	Episode: "The Orange Grove"
1984	Hot Pursuit	Agent Donald Hansen	2 episodes
1984–1985	Santa Barbara	Doctor	8 episodes
1985	J.O.E. and the Colonel	Pike	Television film
1985	Magnum, P.I.	James Dawkins	Episode: "The Treasure of Kalaniopu'u"
1985	Shadow Chasers	Wyatt	Episode: "The Middle of Somewhere"
1986	Murder, She Wrote	Cliff Anderson	Episode: "Trial by Error"
1986–2002	As the World Turns	Duncan McKechnie	248 episodes
1998–2003	The Bold and the Beautiful	Adam Alexander / Myles Fairchild	132 episodes
2000	Martial Law	Thug	Episode: "No Quarter"
2007	Aliens Gone Wild	Kryocomm CEO	Television film
2007	Big Shots	Chairman	Episode: "Greatest Amerimart Hero"
2008	NCIS	Ray Vittorio	Episode: "Collateral Damage"
2009	Bound by a Secret	Jamison Trunk	Television film
2009	Eli Stone	Jeff Medearis	Episode: "Sonoma"
2010	Turbulent Skies	Capt. Lankford	Television film
2010	Dinocroc vs. Supergator	Delirious Scientist	Television film
2011	Bernie Malt	McNeil	Television film
2012	Piranhaconda	Pike	Television film
2012	The Bay	Buck Stanton	5 episodes
2012	Anger Management	Victor	Episode: "Charlie Dates Kate's Patient"
2013	Sexy Wives Sinsations	Captain	Television film
2013	Pleasure Spa	Captain Crane	Television film
2015	Scared Topless	Professor Rand	Television film
2017	Legend of the Naked Ghost	Mr. Rand	Television film
2017	Atwill at Large	Nelson Chadwick	5 episodes
2017–2018	Hilton Head Island	Daniel Trisk	29 episodes
2021	Dirty Little Deeds	Francis	Television film
2021	Furry Little Christmas	Mitch	Television film
2025	The Young and the Restless	Will Hensley	Guest role
