= Carlos Valdes (actor) =

Colombian-American actor and singer (born 1989)

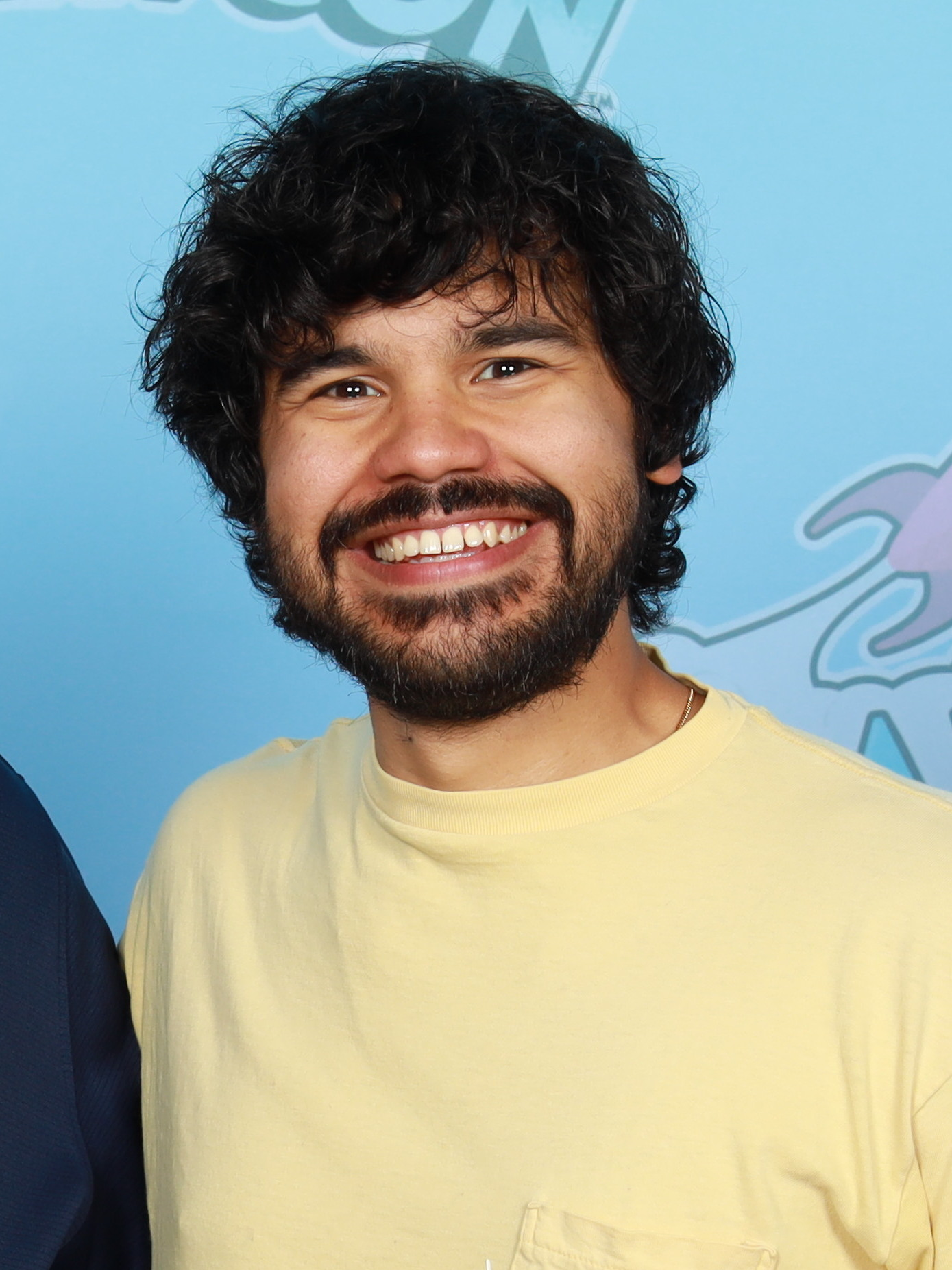
- Valdes at GalaxyCon Des Moines in 2025
- Born: Carlos David Valdes; April 20, 1989 (age 37); Cali, Colombia
- Citizenship: United States
- Education: University of Michigan
- Occupations: Actor; singer
- Height: 173 cm (5 ft 8 in)
- Partner: Mae Whitman (2023–present)
- Children: 1
- Musical career
- Genres: Soul; funk; R&B; pop; Rap; Gospel; Musical theatre

Carlos David Valdes (born April 20, 1989) is a Colombian-American actor and singer. He is best known for his role as Cisco Ramon/Vibe on The CW television series The Flash and other Arrowverse-related projects. Additionally, he starred as Orpheus in the Broadway production of Hadestown.

== Early life and education ==
Valdes was born in Cali, Colombia and raised in Miami, Florida by the age of 5, then moved again to Marietta, Georgia at the age of 12. He studied at the University of Michigan with Darren Criss and other actors from the theater group StarKid Productions, and co-wrote their 2009 musical Me and My Dick. Additionally he played the bass for that show as well as for A Very Potter Musical, and was featured on the track "A Thousand and One Nights (Pop Version)" which played during the end credits of Twisted and appeared on the cover album Twisted: Twisted.

== Career ==
In 2011 and 2012, Valdes was a stand-in in the second national tour of Jersey Boys. From March 2013 to March 2014, he played the role of Andrej in the musical Once, in which he also performed on piano, guitar, ukulele, bass, and percussion.

In 2014, Valdes made his television debut in the American series Arrow, before appearing in the spin-off series, The Flash, as a series regular in the role of Francisco "Cisco" Ramón, an engineer at S.T.A.R. Labs who assists Barry Allen alongside Harrison Wells and Caitlin Snow. Ramon is later revealed to have metahuman powers and takes on the moniker Vibe. Valdes also played alternate universe variants of Ramon: his Earth-2 doppelganger, who goes by Reverb; Pablo, a waiter in the season 3 episode "Duet"; and his Earth-19 doppelganger, who goes by Echo. Valdes also voiced the character in the animated spin-off web series Vixen. Valdes exited The Flash after its seventh season.

Valdes also works as a songwriter, instrumentalist, and recording artist. In 2015, he independently released the EP Night Off, under his music pseudonym Tha Los.

== Personal life ==
Valdes has one son, who was born on August 28, 2024, with Mae Whitman.

== Filmography ==
Television and web series
Year	Title	Role	Notes
2014–2018	Arrow	Cisco Ramon/Vibe/Mecha-Vibe (Note: Also makes appearances as Francisco Ramon / Reverb (Earth-2) in the episode "Welcome to Earth-2", as Pablo in the episode "Duet" and as Cisco Ramon / Echo (Earth-19) in the episode "Kiss Kiss Breach Breach". He has also voiced the character Cisco Ramon / Vibe (Earth-X) for the animated series Freedom Fighters: The Ray.) (Note: Mecha-Vibe since episode "Central City Strong" of season 7.)	Recurring role, 6 episodes
2014–2021	The Flash	Cisco Ramon/Vibe/Mecha-Vibe	Main role (seasons 1–7)
2015–2016	Vixen	Cisco Ramon/Vibe/Mecha-Vibe	Web series; recurring role, 7 episodes
2016	The Flash: Chronicles of Cisco	Cisco Ramon/Vibe/Mecha-Vibe	Web series; lead role
2016–2017	Legends of Tomorrow	Cisco Ramon/Vibe/Mecha-Vibe	3 episodes
2016–2018	Supergirl	Cisco Ramon/Vibe/Mecha-Vibe	3 episodes
2017	Freedom Fighters: The Ray	Cisco Ramon/Vibe/Mecha-Vibe	Web series; recurring role, 8 episodes
2020	Wayward Guide for the Untrained Eye	Dr. Henry Edwards	Web series; recurring role, 9 episodes
2022	Gaslit	Paul Magallanes	Miniseries 6 episodes
2023	Up Here	Miguel	Lead role, Hulu

Film
Year	Title	Role	Notes
2025	For Worse	Patrick	
TBA	Old Mission		Post-production

Video games
Year	Title	Role	Notes
2023	Starfield	Matteo	Supporting character

== Theater ==
Year	Production	Role	Notes
2009	Evita	Che	University of Michigan
2011–2012	Jersey Boys	Swing	Second National Tour; covered five parts including Frankie Valli
2013–2014	Once	Andrej	Broadway
2015	Zorba	Pavli	Encores! New York City Center
2025	Hadestown	Orpheus	Broadway
