= Rainbow Raider =

Publication information
- Publisher: DC Comics
- First appearance: The Flash #286 (June 1980)
- Created by: Cary Bates; Don Heck

In-story information
- Alter ego: Roy G. Bivolo
- Species: Human
- Team affiliations: Rogues; Black Lantern Corps; Color Queens
- Notable aliases: Chroma; Prism
- Abilities: Special goggles allow projection of hard-light rainbows for travel or attack Can alter people's emotions by coating them in certain colors

Rainbow Raider (Roy G. Bivolo) is a supervillain appearing in comic books by DC Comics. His real name is a pun based on the acronym "ROYGBIV", a mnemonic for the colors of a rainbow. He is a minor, though recurring, enemy of the Flash and other heroes.

Two incarnations of the Rainbow Raider appear in The Flash, with Roy G. Bivolo appearing in the first and ninth seasons, portrayed by Paul Anthony, and a female incarnation named Carrie Bates appearing in the seventh season, portrayed by Jona Xiao.

== Publication history ==
Rainbow Raider first appeared in The Flash #286 (June 1980), and was created by Cary Bates and Don Heck.

Bates said in a 2008 interview that "Rainbow Raider's color-blindness (as well as the color-emotion powers and origin) was an attempt on his part to emulate those classic Rogues' Gallery villain origins Bates enjoyed so much from the sixties".

Bates elaborated on the characters creation stating "Having grown up on a Flash Rogue’s gallery full of villains who were adept at weaponizing things like mirrors, cold, heat, magic, boomerangs, etc., Julie and I thought the color spectrum gimmick had the potential to be a worthwhile addition."

== Fictional character biography ==
As a child, Roy G. Bivolo always dreamed of a career as an artist, a lofty goal considering he was completely colorblind. He would often paint what he thought were beautiful pieces of art and showed great technical skill, only to be told that his art had clashing colors. His father, an optometrist and genius in optical technology, swore he would find a cure for his son's disorder. Due to failing health, he was unable to complete his product, but instead created a sophisticated pair of goggles that would allow Roy to create beams of solid rainbow-colored light. On his death-bed, his father presents him with this gift, and it was not long before Roy found a sinister use for it.

Turning to crime because the world did not appreciate his art, Roy, now the Rainbow Raider, went on a crime spree focused mostly on art galleries, saying that if he could not appreciate the great works of art in them (due to his disability), then no one else would. Rainbow Raider and Booster Gold work together to expose an artist who had stolen Roy's black-and-white art, added color to it, and found false fame as an artist. Raider happily surrendered himself after this was accomplished.

Rainbow Raider once traded opponents with Batman villain Doctor Double X after meeting a motivational therapist named Professor Andrea Wye. Both of them are defeated by Batman and Flash. Rainbow Raider is later imprisoned in Belle Reve, where he is part of the Color Queens prison gang alongside Crazy Quilt, Doctor Light, Doctor Spectro, and Multi-Man.

Roy is later killed by Blacksmith. Following Rainbow Raider's death, a team of color-themed supervillains dubbed themselves the Rainbow Raiders in his honor. During the "Blackest Night" storyline, Roy is temporarily resurrected as a Black Lantern.

Roy is permanently resurrected in The New 52 continuity reboot, where he is known as Chroma. During the Forever Evil storyline, Chroma is present in Central City when Gorilla Grodd invades with an army of gorillas. Grodd later kills Chroma to warn the other villains that the Gem Cities are his. Chroma later appears alive, with no explanation given for his survival.

== Powers and abilities ==
Rainbow Raider's powers are derived from the special goggles he wears, which allow him to project solid beams of rainbow-colored light he can either use offensively or as a slide for travel. In addition, he can coat people in certain colors of light to induce emotions (coating someone in blue light, for instance, would make them sad).

== Reception ==
Heavy.com lists Rainbow Raider as one of the worst supervillains of all time. Francesco Marciuliano from Smosh.com ranked Rainbow Raider as having one of the worst supervillain gadgets of all time.

== Other characters named Rainbow Raider ==
There have been other characters who have used the Rainbow Raider identity:

- Jonathan Kent posed as a supervillain called Rainbow Raider as part of a plot to help Superboy capture gangster Vic Munster and his gang. Munster later used the Rainbow Raider identity himself, only to be defeated by Superboy.
- Dr. Quin (a villain from the first Dial H for Hero series) appears in House of Mystery #167 (June 1967) as a different Rainbow Raider. This version temporarily gave himself powers using a rare crystal that changed his body into different colors. Red allows him to generate heated beams, orange generates an obscuring cloud, yellow gives him the ability to drain energy and superpowers, green allows him to slow the bodies of others to the point of paralysis for an hour, and violet shrinks people and objects for an hour. He also has a final color power called Ultra-Violet which makes him invisible.

== In other media ==
=== Television ===
- Two incarnations of Rainbow Raider appear in The Flash:
  - Roy G. Bivolo appears in the first and ninth seasons, portrayed by Paul Anthony. This version is a metahuman capable of inciting anger via eye contact and a member of the Red Death's Rogues. Though Cisco Ramon initially refers to him as Prism, Caitlin Snow insists on calling him Rainbow Raider, which ends up sticking.
  - A female incarnation named Carrie Bates / Rainbow Raider 2.0 appears in the seventh season episode "Good-Bye Vibrations", portrayed by Jona Xiao. She is a former collections officer who was fired for cancelling debts instead of collecting them and became a metahuman capable of inducing euphoria. She begins giving money to the less fortunate in a manner akin to Robin Hood, which attracts the attention of Team Flash. Rainbow Raider 2.0 is talked down by Team Flash and is sentenced to work in the Economic Development Committee.
- Roy G. Bivolo appears in the Teen Titans Go! episode "Real Art", voiced by Scott O'Brien.
- Rainbow Raider makes a non-speaking cameo appearance in the Harley Quinn episode "B.I.T.C.H.".

=== Film ===
Rainbow Raider appears in Teen Titans Go! To the Movies.

=== Video games ===
- Rainbow Raider appears as a character summon in Scribblenauts Unmasked: A DC Comics Adventure.
- Rainbow Raider appears as a downloadable playable character in Lego Batman 3: Beyond Gotham as part of the "Rainbow" DLC pack.

=== Miscellaneous ===
- Rainbow Raider appears in Batman: The Brave and the Bold #14.
- Rainbow Raider appears in The Flash tie-in novel The Haunting of Barry Allen.
