= Attack of the Killer Donuts =

2016 horror comedy film

- Film poster
- Directed by: Scott Wheeler
- Written by: Nathan Dalton; Chris De Christopher; Rafael Diaz Wagner
- Produced by: Rafael Diaz Wagner; Nicole M. Saad
- Starring: Justin Ray; Kayla Compton; Michael Swan; C. Thomas Howell
- Cinematography: Howard Wexler
- Edited by: Christian McIntire
- Music by: Joel Someillan
- Production companies: Restless Nomad Films; Rogue State
- Distributed by: Level 33 Entertainment; Cardinal XD
- Release dates: July 17, 2016 (Japan); November 17, 2017 (USA)
- Running time: 98 minutes
- Country: United States
- Language: English

Attack of the Killer Donuts is a 2016 American horror comedy film directed by Scott Wheeler and written by Nathan Dalton, Chris De Christopher and Rafael Diaz Wagner. The film is produced by Diaz Wagner and Nicole Saad. It stars Justin Ray as Johnny, an employee in a donut shop who, along with his friends, is terrorized by an army of reanimated donuts.

== Plot ==
Johnny Wentworth works at the Dandy Donuts donut shop alongside his childhood friend Michelle Kester. One day before work, he retrieves his tablet from his Uncle Luther, a mad scientist who has unwittingly created a serum to reanimate the dead. While at the shop, Johnny is confronted by his girlfriend Veronica and friend Bobby, who require money. Luther later arrives at the shop and demands Johnny's tablet, leading to a fight between Luther and Cliff Burbank, the owner of Dandy Donuts. During the scuffle, a vial of the serum flies out of Luther's breast pocket and lands in the fat of the donut fryer. This contaminates all the donuts in the fryer and, after some time, reanimates them as killer donuts.

Two police officers unknowingly buy a box of contaminated donuts. A suspect in their squad car eats one and becomes visibly sick, escaping the car and knocking the officers unconscious. A rival restaurant owner, Flanagan, visits Dandy Donuts and taunts Cliff with his new, healthier pastry. Cliff then convinces Flanagan to take home a sugar donut, unaware that the donut is contaminated. Later, while Flanagan is in the shower, the donut mutates and eats him alive.

Johnny's friend Howard arrives at Dandy Donuts and begins talking with Johnny and Michelle. Soon after, three teenagers enter the shop and begin harassing Michelle. Johnny defends her, and the incident escalates into a fight. Cliff fires Michelle for pepper spraying the teenagers; Johnny quits in protest, and Howard follows him. To mediate the situation, Cliff provides the teenagers with a complementary box of donuts. When the teenagers attempt to eat them, they are instead attacked by the killer donuts.

While driving back, the trio encounter the criminal, who dies in front of them, due to the donuts. Continuing on, Johnny finds Bobby's car; inside, they discover Veronica cheating on Johnny with Bobby. Veronica confesses to Johnny that she and he were never a couple, and that she only used Johnny for money. Veronica taunts Johnny, who leaves saddened. Driving to Johnny's home, the three find the bodies of the three teenagers, along with several killer donuts. They then decide to ensure the safety of Mrs. Scolari, a regular customer of Dandy Donuts who had bought a dozen donuts earlier.

Upon reaching Mrs. Scolari's house, the trio find her dead, alongside a large group of killer donuts. While Michelle escapes, Johnny and Howard fight the donuts off, destroying several. The two officers, who had been searching for the escaped criminal, arrive at the house and take the trio into custody. Johnny and Michelle trick the officers into entering the house, allowing the trio to escape. The killer donuts steal the officers' squad car and drive to Bobby's car, killing Veronica and Bobby.

The trio then visit Luther, who has developed an anti-serum. Armed with weapons and the anti-serum, Johnny, Michelle, Howard and Luther travel back to Dandy Donuts, where they find an army of killer donuts and a deceased Cliff. Howard confesses to having an affair with Johnny's mother and sacrifices himself by venturing out the donut shop. The officers arrive to help the group, but they are slaughtered by the donuts. While Luther escapes to make more anti-serum, Michelle and Johnny enter into the shop but are forced to take shelter in the storage closet. In order to destroy all the killer donuts, they decide to blow up the Dandy Donuts, escaping via the sewers. Afterwards, Johnny and Michelle end up in bed and confess their love for each other.

== Cast ==
- Justin Ray as Johnny Wentworth
- Kassandra Voyagis as Emma Wentworth
- Michael Swan as Uncle Luther
- Kayla Compton as Michelle Kester
- Alison England as Mrs. Charlie Scolari
- Chris De Christopher as Cliff Burbank
- Fredrick Burns as Officer Hammerstein
- C. Thomas Howell as Officer Rogers
- Ben Heyman as Howard
- Lauren Compton as Veronica (credited as Lauren Elise)

== Reception ==
Jordan Mintzer of The Hollywood Reporter called the movie "[cheap] by the dozen but nonetheless enjoyable." Noel Murray of the LA Times criticized the film as "lack[ing] any real imagination", ultimately labeling it as a project "aimed at garbage connoisseurs looking for something dumb to watch with friends on a weekend night." Charles Cargile of PopHorror.com complimented the movie as a "fun and cheesy creature feature with likable characters played by a wonderful cast."
