= Sherlock Bristol =

American congregational clergyman

- Born: 5 Jun 1815; Connecticut, US
- Died: 26 Sep 1906 (aged 91); Montalvo, Ventura County, California, US
- Occupation: Congregational clergyman
- Notable work: The Pioneer Preacher

Sherlock Bristol (5 June 1815 – 26 September 1906) was an American congregational clergyman.

== Quotes ==
I was born on the farm where my father was born, where his father was born, where his father was born, and which his father cleared and cultivated and where, also, he died, five generations of us, successively living practically under the same roof, and deriving our sustenance from the same acres. Our original ancestor referred to was an emigrant from England. He was one of some forty heads of families who colonized a section of the Connecticut forest, claimed by the New Haven Colony, some fifteen miles north of New Haven Harbor. This section was some twelve miles square, and was at the time an almost unbroken forest, abounding in great oaks, some of which were from 500 to 1,000 years old.

— Sherlock Bristol, The Pioneer Preacher (1887)

== Books ==
- The Pioneer Preacher (1887)
