= Doris Sherlock =

American politician (1916–2001)

Member of the Connecticut House of Representatives from Prospect
- In office 1961–1963
- Preceded by: Eraine Genest
- Succeeded by: Robert S. Gray

Personal details
- Born: May 3, 1916 Southbridge, Massachusetts, U.S.
- Died: February 23, 2001 (aged 84)
- Party: Democratic

Doris M. Sherlock (May 3, 1916 – February 23, 2001) was an American politician who served in the Connecticut House of Representatives from 1961 to 1963, representing the town of Prospect as a Democrat.
