= Jona Xiao =

American actress (born 1989)

- 肖乔娜
- Born: Qiaona Xiao; May 18, 1989 (age 37); Changsha, Hunan, China
- Occupation: Actress
- Years active: 2005–present

Jona Xiao
- Traditional Chinese: 肖喬娜
- Simplified Chinese: 肖乔娜
Transcriptions
Standard Mandarin
- Hanyu Pinyin: Xiāo Qiáonà

Jona Xiao (born May 18, 1989) is an American actress born in China.

== Early life ==
Xiao was born in Changsha, China and moved to New York as an infant, before ultimately settling in St. Louis, Missouri with her family; starting acting in middle school. Growing up, she was called racial slurs and decided to be an actress to break against stereotypes. Xiao founded Career ACTivate, which specializes in helping actors jumpstart and progress their careers.

== Career ==
Xiao was cast in Spider-Man: Homecoming in a role that she denies was initially written for an Asian-American actress. Marisa Tomei, who plays Aunt May in the film, lobbied for Xiao to be cast. Her role ended up getting cut in the final film.

In 2021, Xiao lent her voice to a younger Namaari in Raya and the Last Dragon.

== Filmography ==
=== Film ===
Year	Title	Role	Notes
2007	Alice Upside Down	Loretta	
2010	The Mandarin Orange Boy	Lian	
2015	Tag	Arden	
2016	Keeping Up with the Joneses	Stacey Chung	
2017	Gifted	Lijuan	
2017	Spider-Man: Homecoming	Gina	Deleted scenes
2018	Flavors of Youth	Lulu (voice)	English dub
2019	Mercy	Kathy	Short film
2021	Raya and the Last Dragon	Young Namaari (voice)	

=== Television ===
Year	Title	Role	Notes
2009	The Forgotten	Female Med Student	Episode: "Pilot"
2012	Female Vampires Online	Jin	Episode: "Her Highness"
2012	Victorious	Nina	Episode: "Driving Tori Crazy"
2012	Crackhorse Presents	Rebecca	Episode: "Becoming One"
2012	Paul Goetz's Last Ditch Effort	Lori	Episode: "Thumb and Thumber"
2012	2 Broke Girls	Hipster #3	Episode: "And the Pearl Necklace"
2013	Kroll Show	TBA	2 episodes
2013	Bones	Miriam Young	Episode: "The Party in the Pants"
2013	The Young and the Restless	Angie	1 episode
2013	Trophy Wife	Graduate 3	Episode: "Pilot"
2014	Days of Our Lives	Joelle	1 episode
2014	Saving Face	Soo Jin Park	TV Pilot
2014	Rizzoli & Isles	Young Mother	Episode: "It Takes a Village"
2016	Halt and Catch Fire	Julie Yang	4 episodes
2017	Being Mary Jane	Natalie Wu	Recurring (season 4)
2019	Fête	Linseed	Episode: "2017"
2021	Hightown	Daisy	Recurring (season 2)
2021	Resident Evil: Infinite Darkness	Shen May (voice)	Web series
2021	The Flash	Rainbow Raider 2.0 / Carrie Bates	Episode: "Good-Bye Vibrations"
2022	S.W.A.T.	Grace	Episode: "Unraveling"
2024	NCIS	Dr. Mei Li	Episode: "The Plan"
2025	Eyes of Wakanda	Jorani / Iron Fist (voice)	Episode: "Lost and Found"
2025	The Pitt	OB Nurse Sam Garvin	Episode: "9:00 P.M." (Season 2)
2027	Scooby-Doo: Origins	TBA	Filming
