= Sherlock, Texas =

- Unincorporated community
- Location within Texas Location within the United States
- Coordinates: 36°26′44″N 100°13′26″W
- Country: United States
- State: Texas
- County: Lipscomb
- Elevation: 2,681 ft (817 m)
- Time zone: UTC-6 (Central (CST))
  - Summer (DST): UTC-5 (CDT)
- Area code: 806
- GNIS feature ID: 1380529

Sherlock (also Sherlock Station) is an unincorporated community in Lipscomb County, Texas, United States.
