= Kayla Compton =

American actress

- Born: February 3, 1990 (age 36); Salinas, California, United States
- Occupation: Actress
- Years active: 2011–present

Kayla Compton is an American actress. She is best known for playing Allegra Garcia in the superhero series The Flash.

== Early life ==
Compton was born in Salinas, California on February 3 1990. In high school, she competed in a school pageant and won the title of Miss Congeniality. She graduated from the University of Florida.

== Career ==
Her first big role came playing Allegra Garcia in the superhero series The Flash. She was upgraded to a series regular for season 7.She directed the eleventh episode of the ninth season. She will play Kiah in the upcoming techno thriller film A.I. Heart U.

== Filmography ==
=== Film ===
Year	Title	Role	Notes
2013	King's Faith	Natalie Jenkins	
2016	Attack of the Killer Donuts	Michelle Kester	
2016	The Stanford Letter	Kayla	Short
2018	Rubies and Diamonds	Riley	Short
2018	Emily X	Emily	
2020	The Z Girl Next Door	Girl	Short
2022	In Training	Trina	Short
2022	The Devil's Daughters	Lucy	Short
2026	A.I. Heart U	Kiah	

=== Television ===
Year	Title	Role	Notes
2011	Entourage	Monica	Episode; Home Sweet Home
2012	Perception	Indie Girl	Episode; Kilimanjaro
2014	Mistresses	Salesgirl	Episode; Rebuild
2015	Vanity	Young Woman	Episode; Legacy
2015	Chase Champion	Gretchen	5 episodes
2016	Bro-Dum	Naomi	3 episodes
2016	Part Timers	Nisha	Episode; Who's the Father?
2016	Making Moves	Kara	4 episodes
2018	S Is for Revenge	Chloe	Episode; Chapter 3
2019-2023	The Flash	Allegra Garcia	63 episodes; Directed: "A New World, Part Two: The Blues"
2024	Doctor Odyssey	August	Episode; Singles Week
