= Harrison Wells =

Fictional character from the television series The Flash

- Arrowverse characters
- Clockwise from top left: Earth-1 Harrison Wells, Harry, H. R., Sherloque and Nash.
- First appearance: "Pilot"; The Flash; October 7, 2014
- Last appearance: "A New World, Part Four"; The Flash; May 24, 2023
- Created by: Greg Berlanti; Andrew Kreisberg; Geoff Johns
- Based on: Nash Wells: Pariah by: Marv Wolfman; George Pérez
- Portrayed by: Tom Cavanagh; Other Candice Patton (as Iris West); Grant Gustin (via Barry Allen)

Harrison Wells is the name of several characters portrayed by Tom Cavanagh in The CW's Arrowverse franchise, primarily on the television series The Flash. Wells, created by Geoff Johns, Greg Berlanti, and Andrew Kreisberg, is an original creation for the series and is not based on any existing character appearing in comics published by DC Comics. Most versions of Wells are from parallel universes, known for their high intelligence and scientific knowledge.

The most prominently featured versions of Wells are Earth-1's Harrison Wells (and Eobard Thawne impersonating him); Harry Wells of Earth-2; writer H. R. Wells of Earth-19; detective Sherloque Wells (/ˈʃɜːrloʊk/) of Earth-221; and explorer Nash Wells who temporarily became the series' version of Pariah. Also featured, less prominently, are the Council of Wells and the Council of Harrisons, which consist of various doppelgängers.

Critics and fans have praised Cavanagh's performances as various versions of the character, particularly Harry, although some criticized his performance as H. R. and Sherloque. The Council of Wells and Council of Harrisons received a mixed reception from critics; some praised their humor and Cavanagh's versatility in portraying them while others criticized their skit-like nature.

== Concept and creation ==
Executive producers Greg Berlanti and Andrew Kreisberg, and DC Comics CCO Geoff Johns, created the character of Harrison Wells for The CW series The Flash, although he is first mentioned in the Arrow season 2 episode "Three Ghosts". While a character named "Dr. Wells" had appeared in "Elevator To Nowhere", a 1980 episode of the ABC animated series Super Friends, and another namesake character in Flash TV Special #1, a January 1991 tie-in comic book with the CBS live-action series The Flash (1990), Johns has said that Harrison Wells is an original creation for the CW series. On February 10, 2014, Tom Cavanagh was cast in the role, described as "a rock star in the world of physics and the mind and money behind Central City's S.T.A.R. Labs Particle Accelerator." This differed from the comics where Garrison Slate founded S.T.A.R. Labs. Cavanagh described Apple founder Steve Jobs as an inspiration for the character. It was eventually revealed that "Wells" was actually Eobard Thawne; the real Wells made his debut in "Tricksters", in which a flashback reveals that Thawne assumed Wells' identity after murdering him. The producers had not planned this twist from the start, with Kreisberg saying, 'We were talking about, 'well what if Wells wasn't Wells? What if he stole Wells' body?'". Subsequent seasons have Cavanagh portray other versions of Wells.

== Characterization ==
Cavanagh has differentiated each version of Wells he portrays based on character mannerisms, voice, and origin story.

Harry Wells of Earth-2, introduced in season two, is described as someone who "seems bad but he's good", the opposite of Thawne. Grant Gustin, who portrays Barry Allen, described Harry as a "douchebag". Cavanagh said, though he was not written that way, it was his idea to portray the character as egotistical. He also described Harry as "socially awkward", but ultimately "a good guy at heart". Kriesberg differentiated Harry from Thawne by calling him "a tortured man who's beset with guilt" who loves his daughter. He added, "[Harry is] a jerk, but he's doing everything he's doing because he loves his daughter more than anything in the world." According to Cavanagh, Harry was created to give the series a "daily antagonist".

Season three introduces H. R. Wells of Earth-19. Cavanagh described him as "a bit of a con man ... But I didn't want to repeat myself from [season two], so what I thought I would try [this season] is a guy who fills it up with comedy." He said the character was created to bring more "comedic power" to the series in a way that would not undermine its serious narrative. Regarding the relationship between Harry and H. R., he said, "Harry hated [H. R.] because he thought he was an idiot. H. R. thought Harry was the best thing ever." H. R. and the three other versions of Wells seen in the episode "The New Rogues" were created by Cavanagh.

Sherlock Holmes was the inspiration for Sherloque Wells, introduced in season five. Cavanagh described Sherloque as "a very intelligent human being who is maybe not to be trusted", and as being filled with "intrigue and deceit, fun, humor, intensity, and very loud." He called the character a combination of Harry's intelligence and H. R.'s comedic personality. Cavanagh later expanded, saying, "The idea of Sherloque, a master detective, who's really funny because he'll have this pomposity but also he'll actually be good at what he does, tracking down the Reverse-Flash, essentially me tracking down me... fits with the story and it's not indulgent". Sherloque was written as a French man, and a rival of Ralph Dibny because of them being in the same profession. Cavanagh created the running gag of Sherloque having to correct others on the pronunciation of his name.

Season six introduces Nash Wells, who Cavanagh described as "a bit of an adventurer, a swashbuckler." He said the character was almost written as an Australian, but the writers "ended up going with something different – but we were very close to making him Australian." Season six showrunner Eric Wallace described Nash as "a man who can kind of get in a fight and hold his own", unlike any previous version of Wells. Nash eventually becomes the series' version of Pariah.

Regarding the creation of the Council of Wells, Cavanagh recalled:

We had a sprinkling of it when they were on their quest for H. R. Wells last year where we had Hells Wells, Mime Wells, and Steampunk Wells, and so that was just a one-off, but that got everybody's juices flowing like, 'If we were to do that, what would that look like with there being a Council of Wells that could convene?' [...] We thought, 'Oh, this is going to be completely obnoxious and shameless when I get a hold of it,' and it is proving to be super obnoxious and ultra-shameless in hopefully the most appealing way.

The Flash season four and five showrunner Todd Helbing described the Council of Wells as being "all about intelligence and being the smartest people in the universe", and the Council of Harrisons as its "emo version". Cavanagh described Herr Wells as someone who thinks "everything that is not German is not good" and Wells 2.0 as a "bad ass from the Outback, who doesn't like anybody". Gandalf, a character in J. R. R. Tolkien's Middle-earth stories, was the model for Wells the Grey, Hugh Hefner was the inspiration for H. Lothario Wells, and the Mad Max franchise was the inspiration for Wells 2.0. Cavanagh commented that, despite the one-off and skit-like nature of these versions of Wells, "in my mind, they're real guys. They exist. The situation is comic, but they're not."

== Fictional character biographies ==
=== Harrison Wells (Earth-1) ===
In season one, Harrison Wells is introduced as the founder and director of S.T.A.R. Labs, located in Central City. After much press coverage in 2013, he activates a particle accelerator that explodes, releasing dark matter energy that transforms various people, including Barry Allen, into metahumans. In 2014, Wells is now a recluse and pariah of Central City while he and his assistants Cisco Ramon and Caitlin Snow help Barry as the Flash; Wells pushes Barry to run faster to increase abilities as a speedster by taking down metahuman criminals. It is eventually revealed that "Wells" is actually the speedster Eobard Thawne / Reverse-Flash in disguise.

In 2000, the real Wells of Earth-1 was married to Tess Morgan, whom he met when they worked as research partners in Maryland, and was friends with Tina McGee. A car crash in Starling City that injured Wells and killed Tess was caused by the time-displaced Thawne who then stole his likeness using a futuristic device, killing Wells in the process. In the present, Joe West's investigation into Tess's death eventually leads to Team Flash's discovery of Wells' corpse. In subsequent seasons, Thawne's various identity theft actions make it difficult for doppelgängers of Wells to be in the general public.

In season seven, Wells is revived in the Earth-Prime timeline because of the Crisis and his doppelgängers' sacrifice caused the universe to need his presence as balance. Wells rematerializes where he was buried 20 years prior as a particle being able to appear anywhere at will. In possession of his doppelgängers' memories and feelings towards their various friends, Wells returns to 2020 Central City to help Barry and Iris West-Allen restore the natural Speed Force and assist with the struggle against Eva McCulloch. He later uses his new temporal manipulation abilities to live through any point in his own lifetime, which he intends to use to put himself in a time loop of his marriage with Tess; his powers lead to him being nicknamed "Timeless Wells" by Cisco. Wells is briefly retrieved from Starling City in 2000 when Barry wants to travel back in time to remove Fuerza, Psych and Deon Owens's connections to the Strength, Sage and Still Forces, in order to create a "time bubble" to protect the timeline. The two, over Team Flash's objections, travel to the proper point in time and are nearly successful before ultimately aborting the plan in that doing this amounts to "murdering" the Forces of Nature. Wells also has a heart-to-heart talk with Cisco before returning to the past.

Wells appears in the series finale, advising Khione of the necessity of ascending as the natural order's protector and attends a party celebrating Nora West-Allen's birth.

=== Harry Wells ===
Harrison Wells, the founder and director of the S.T.A.R Labs on Earth-2, travels to Earth-1 in season two. Nicknamed "Harry" by Cisco, he tells Team Flash he plans to help them stop Hunter Zolomon / Zoom who has kidnapped his daughter Jesse. In reality, Harry is being extorted by Zoom into developing a Speed Force transmitting device to steal Barry's speed in exchange for Jesse's life. Harry finds he ultimately cannot continue with the plan and confesses his collaboration with Zoom to Team Flash. He gains Barry and Cisco's help rescuing Jesse from Earth-2; Harry and Jesse then seek refuge on Earth-1. After Zoom's defeat, they return to Earth-2.

In season three, Harry approaches Team Flash, asking their help in dissuading Jesse, now a speedster, from being a superhero, but eventually comes to accept his daughter's intentions. The two return to Earth-2 after helping the team recruit another doppelgänger as Harry's replacement. Some time after, Harry is captured and imprisoned by Gorilla City's denizens and Team Flash rescues him. He later helps Team Flash fight Savitar. Following Savitar's defeat, Harry remains on Earth-1 as a favor when Barry enters the Speed Force in order to stabilize it.

In season four, Harry has returned to Earth-2 for undisclosed reasons, but Cisco mentions him as one of the scientists who assisted in developing a way to retrieve Barry from the Speed Force. Harry returns after an argument with Jesse, and helps the team fight Clifford DeVoe / Thinker. He builds a "thinking cap" to augment his intelligence with dark matter to outwit DeVoe, but the device is pushed past its safety limits and his brain is damaged; now the more he uses his intellect, the faster he loses it. Following DeVoe's defeat, with help from the latter's wife, Team Flash tries to restore Harry's intelligence; Harry recovers his normal mental functions, but not his genius-level intellect. Undeterred, he is grateful for the insight into other aspects of his personality, and leaves for Earth-2 after bidding Team Flash a heartfelt farewell.

Earth-2 was destroyed by the Anti-Monitor months before the Crisis began with Harry among those who perished. Following the Crisis in which the multiverse is rebooted, Harry is still presumed dead as Team Flash mistakenly believe the multiverse is gone, though it is learned that his intellect was recovering prior. But it is later revealed that Harry's consciousness remains (along with that of his other doppelgängers) in the mind of doppelgänger Nash Wells.

=== H. R. Wells ===
Harrison "H. R." Wells of Earth-19 is one of several versions of Harrison Wells in season three who finds the cryptogram sent by Harry through the multiverse and expresses interest in aiding Team Flash. Although Harry objects, Team Flash finalizes H. R. as his replacement. H. R. is later revealed to not be a scientist; he admits that he came to Earth-1 primarily to get material for a novel, and is only the founder and "idea man" for S.T.A.R. Labs on Earth-19. Barry suggests letting the overbearingly good-natured H. R. stay a few weeks, and he proves his worth by helping form plans and locating powered criminals. He trains Wally West in the use of the youth's speedster powers and, after discovering how many criminals breached the facility, attempts to transform S.T.A.R. Labs into a museum to maintain Team Flash's cover. Gypsy, an enforcer from Earth-19, arrives to retrieve H. R. on charges of interdimensional travel as it is forbidden on Earth-19, but is defeated by Cisco. H. R. is spared but he is warned not to return to Earth-19. In the battle against Savitar, H. R. sacrifices himself by disguising himself as Iris and taking the latter's place to be killed by Savitar. His actions earn him Harry's respect, and his death is avenged when Iris kills Savitar. Iris later eulogizes H. R. as a hero. Season seven revealed the multiverse's recreation resulted in H. R.'s consciousness fused with Nash's mind.

=== Sherloque Wells ===
Harrison Sherloque Wells, a detective from Earth-221, is hired in season five by Team Flash to investigate the metahuman serial killer Cicada. He is forced to stay on Earth-1 after his initial deductions prove incorrect because this version of Cicada has a different secret identity than the 37 versions of David Hersh that Sherloque has previously identified. After investigating further, he announces Cicada's true identity Orlin Dwyer. He also becomes suspicious of the future version of Nora West-Allen, and secretly investigates which leads him to discover the speedster's allegiance with Thawne. Sherloque has married, and subsequently divorced various versions of Renee Adler in the multiverse and eventually starts dating the Earth-1 version. He sends the Earth-1 Renee, who is a metahuman, to his Earth to keep her safe from Cicada II. After Cicada II is defeated, Sherloque returns to his Earth, acknowledging Ralph Dibny as an equal detective and reunites with the Earth-1 Renee. During the Crisis, Sherloque perished, but seasons six and seven revealed the multiverse's rebooting resulted in his consciousness fused with Nash's mind.

=== Nash Wells ===
Harrison Nash Wells, an explorer and self-proclaimed myth-buster from an unidentified Earth, comes to Earth-1 in season six in search of a substance called eternium, which he eventually finds in the sewers of Central City. He later aids Barry and Cisco in a heist in exchange for a crypto-circuit he claims only Cisco can build. After obtaining it, he returns to the sewers and tracks the Monitor's movements. After Team Flash offers to help, Nash reluctantly agrees and tells them he knows how to save Barry from the latter's prophesied death during the impending Crisis. He brings the team to a wall he claims protects a portal the Monitor uses to hide out, expressing his desire to expose the Monitor as a false god. Nash later destroys the wall, and finds a door etched with symbols, before a voice promises him a new life in exchange for bowing down before it. Nash initially refuses, but ultimately agrees after the voice seemingly saves him. Afterwards, a blinding light appears and teleports him inside.

The Crisis revealed that Nash inadvertently freed the Anti-Monitor, tricking him into thinking he helped the Monitor and used him to escape imprisonment. As a result, Nash is the "Pariah" cursed to bear witness as penance while the Anti-Monitor destroys the multiverse. As billions of Earths are wiped out, Nash assists Team Flash in destroying the Anti-Monitor's anti-matter cannon, but the Anti-Monitor succeeds in destroying the multiverse anyway. Nash teleports the Paragons, the seven heroes capable of stopping the Anti-Monitor, to safety at the Vanishing Point before he is killed. After the Paragons and Oliver Queen defeat the Anti-Monitor and reboot the multiverse, Nash is restored on the newly-formed Earth-Prime reality. He initially forgot what happened until J'onn J'onzz restores his memories. Nash learns the Anti-Monitor is still alive and works with Barry, Ray Palmer, and Ryan Choi to develop a bomb capable of shrinking the Anti-Monitor for eternity.

After Cisco takes a leave of absence from Team Flash, Nash joins the group as a substitute. He also starts seeing hallucinations of Harry. Allegra Garcia learns she had a doppelgänger who worked for Nash and starts to get wary around him. Nash tries to explain himself, but he hallucinates Sherloque warning him. Nash's body is eventually taken over by Thawne, though he remains alive. Team Flash work to exorcise Thawne, and deduce that Nash is the only surviving version of Wells following the Crisis and was fused with all of his counterparts, explaining his hallucinations. Meanwhile, Thawne is composed of negative tachyons who possessed Nash following the Crisis. While in Nash's head, Team Flash learn that Thawne is using his negative memories against him to finalize the possession, particularly the death of his partner and adoptive daughter Maya (Allegra's doppelgänger) who had died while on an adventure with him on Earth-13. With his friends' help, Nash comes to terms with what happened and accepts that it was his fault, expelling Thawne from his body. However, Team Flash cannot do anything about his other counterparts' consciousnesses. After Nash assists Allegra in fighting Esperanza Garcia, the former starts warming up to him.

In season seven, Nash discovers from his various doppelgängers they can activate Barry's Artificial Speed Force (ASF) generator, but it would result in Nash's death as the multiverse particles in his body from his other doppelgängers being absorbed to act as a power source for the generator. As Nash searches for an alternative, he, Allegra and Chester P. Runk try a new method which results in Barry absorbing his doppelgängers' minds, causing Barry to take on their personalities. Realizing that Barry will eventually be killed by their personalities in his brain, Chester, Allegra, and Nash are able to transfer his counterparts back into Nash, after which Nash sacrifices himself and his doppelgängers, including Harry, H. R. and Sherloque, to power the ASF generator, restoring Barry's speed.

=== Other variants of Wells ===
Throughout the series, many versions of Wells from across the multiverse have made brief appearances.

- In season three, several variants of Wells, along with H. R., appear as candidates to replace Harry on Team Flash, such as "Hell's Wells", a cowboy from an unspecified Earth; Wells of Earth-17, a British-accented steampunk scientist; and a French-speaking mime artist from another unspecified Earth.
- During season four, Harry briefly creates the "Council of Wells", which consists of the smartest versions of himself from across the multiverse: Herr Harrison Wolfgang Wells, a German author and scientist from Earth-12; H. Lothario Wells, a playboy-scientist from Earth-47; and Wells 2.0., a cyborg from Earth-22. Also shown is a wizard named "Wells the Grey" from Earth-13. Following Harry's expulsion from the Council because of his declining intelligence, Cisco introduces him to the "Council of Harrisons", based more on empathy than intelligence. Along with Harry, this group includes Lothario Wells (also expelled from the Council of Wells); the Italian Sonny Wells of Earth-24; and H. P. Wells, a French poet from Earth-25.
- Season seven briefly features Harrison Orson Wells, an actor from an unidentified Earth.

During the Crisis, all existing versions of Wells perished, but after the multiverse's rebooting, their consciousnesses were fused into Nash's mind.

== Reception ==
Adam Holmes of CinemaBlend ranked Harry sixth on his list of 10 Best TV Characters DC Introduced in 2015. Reviewing Cavanagh's performance as Harry in the episode "The Darkness and the Light", Eric Walters of Paste said, "Having Tom Cavanagh back is wonderful, and he has brought a renewed energy with him. When Harrison 2 referred to Cisco as 'Crisco,' I knew this episode was going to be hot fire." Screen Rant's Jason Berman ranked Cavanagh fifth on his 2016 list of 20 Best Actors in the Arrowverse, saying, "By now, it has become clear that actors on The Flash are tasked with playing various incarnations of their characters. But Tom Cavanagh (who plays Harrison Wells) has had to take that to the extreme. Cavanagh has showed off his acting chops by playing no less than five different versions of his character on The Flash."

In September 2017, Irina Curovic of Comic Book Resources described Cavanagh's portrayal of the versions of Wells introduced to that point as "flawless", noting that, "Harry was the best fit for team Flash. Not only did he contribute to the team, but he also established meaningful relationships with the members of the team." In his review of the season 4 penultimate episode "Think Fast", which shows Harry's declining intelligence because of the effects of the Thinking Cap, IGN's Jesse Schedeen felt that "Cavanagh is doing a fine job of depicting Harry's deteriorating mental state, playing it both for laughs and tragedy as the situation demands."

Reviewing the episode "The New Rogues", which features Cavanagh portraying multiple versions of Wells, Angelica Jade Bastién of Vulture said that the different Wells "let Tom Cavanagh stretch himself even more as an actor." However, she criticized his portrayal of H. R. in the episode "Untouchable", feeling he was an "annoying character" who was "just another symbol of the show's inability to grow", with his only purpose being to "continue the Harrison Wells mythos." Writing for Comic Book Resources, Stephanie Holland also criticized H. R., describing him as a "hipster Wells, who carries around drumsticks, wears a stupid hat and skinny jeans." She felt he was included only to "keep Tom Cavanagh around in a new role." Holland added that while Cavanagh was "fantastic at making every Wells different, HR just didn't fit on the show." Digital Spy's Morgan Jeffrey felt H. R. did not contribute much to Team Flash except for "plenty of enthusiasm", and was "a tad annoying", but wrote that, by sacrificing his life to save Iris, H. R. "eventually proved his worth."

The Council of Wells and the Council of Harrisons received a divided reception among critics; some praised their humor and Cavanagh's versatility in portraying them, while others criticized the skit-like nature of both Councils. In his review of "When Harry Met Harry...", Schedeen felt the Council of Wells was "basically an excuse for Cavanagh to put on funny wigs and ridiculous accents." He had similar feelings for the episode "Harry and the Harrisons" where Harry joined the Council of Harrisons. Scott Von Doviak of The A.V. Club said this Council did not "make a whole lot of sense, even from a comic-book multiverse perspective", and that its members felt like "community theater skit characters."

Mike Cecchini of Den of Geek said he was initially skeptical of Sherloque during the character's introduction in the fifth season, but while reviewing the episode "Godspeed", said he turned into an "absolute delight". He claimed that, despite the character's limited screen time in the episode, he used it "incredibly effectively", appreciating "the way that he doubles down on not telling the team about his Nora suspicions." In contrast, Schedeen said that while Cavanagh was able to differentiate the various versions of Wells through subtle intonation, body language and personality changes, "Sherloque relied far too heavily on a silly French accent. He felt gimmicky in comparison to his predecessors. And while Sherloque definitely had his moments in Season 5 (mainly as he turned his considerable skills of deduction against his own teammates), the character too often felt superfluous."

== Other appearances ==
- Cavanagh voiced Thawne masquerading as Earth-1 Wells in the Robot Chicken episode "Ants on a Hamburger".
- During the Arrowverse crossover event "Crisis on Earth-X" featuring episodes of Supergirl, Arrow, The Flash, and Legends of Tomorrow, Cavanagh appeared as Harry in each of them.
- The Earth-27 version of Wells appears in The Flash: Johnny Quick, a 2018 tie-in novel to The Flash.
- The final scene of The Flash episode "The Last Temptation of Barry Allen, Pt. 2" featuring Nash first appeared in the Batwoman episode "A Mad Tea-Party", and was re-used for the Supergirl episode "The Wrath of Rama Khan", and the Arrow episode "Purgatory".
