= Sherlock Holmes and Doctor Watson (disambiguation) =

Sherlock Holmes and Doctor Watson may refer to:

== Film ==
- Sherlock Holmes and Dr. Watson, a 1979 Soviet film adaptation of Arthur Conan Doyle's novels
  - The Adventures of Sherlock Holmes and Dr. Watson the entire series of adaptations

== Television ==
- Sherlock Holmes and Doctor Watson, a 1979 television series

== See also ==
- Holmes and Watson (disambiguation)
