= Matt Wells (television presenter) =

Canadian actor

- Born: Newfoundland and Labrador, Canada
- Occupations: Actor, writer

Matt Wells is a Canadian actor and writer from Newfoundland and Labrador. He began in national television on MuchMusic in 2002 as host of the show Going Coastal, followed by Where you at Baby?. and later became a presenter on MuchMore.

Wells grew up in Mount Pearl, Newfoundland and Labrador. He moved to Halifax in 2000 and then to Toronto, Ontario in 2007. He was also a member of the hard rock band Bucket Truck from 1996 to 2007 as singer, and also produced and directed music videos for the band.

In 2018 Wells appeared in the film Crown and Anchor, alongside his former Bucket Truck bandmate Michael Rowe. His other acting roles have included the feature films Who's Yer Father? and Youngblood, and guest appearances in the television series Diggstown, Schitt's Creek, Murdoch Mysteries, SkyMed, Hudson & Rex and The Spencer Sisters. In 2025 he had a recurring role as Eddie in the comedy web series Settle Down.
