= Gorilla City (The Flash) =

- The Flash episodes
- Promotional poster
- Episode nos.: Season 3 Episodes 13 and 14
- Directed by: Dermott Daniel Downs
- Story by: Andrew Kreisberg (part 1); Todd Helbing (part 2)
- Teleplay by: Aaron Helbing (part 1); David Kob (part 1); Benjamin Raab (part 2); Deric A. Hughes (part 2)
- Production codes: T27.13113 (part 1); T27.13114 (part 2)
- Original air dates: February 21, 2017 (part 1); February 28, 2017 (part 2)

Guest appearances
- Tom Felton as Julian Albert; Violett Beane as Jesse Chambers Wells / Jesse Quick; Jessica Camacho as Gypsy; Keith David voices Solovar; David Sobolov voices Gorilla Grodd

Episode chronology
← Previous "Untouchable"	Next → "The Wrath of Savitar"
- The Flash (season 3)

"Gorilla City" is a two-part story arc across the thirteenth and fourteenth episodes of the third season of the American television series The Flash, based on the DC Comics character Barry Allen / Flash. A costumed superhero crime-fighter with the power to move at superhuman speeds, Barry is a crime-scene investigator who gains superhuman speed which he uses to fight criminals, including others who also have superhuman abilities. The series is set in the Arrowverse, sharing continuity with the other television series of the universe, and is a spin-off of Arrow. The storyline began on February 21, 2017, with "Attack on Gorilla City", and concluded on February 28 with "Attack on Central City". The first episode was written by Aaron Helbing and David Kob from a story by Andrew Kreisberg, and the second episode was written by Benjamin Raab and Deric A. Hughes from a story by Todd Helbing. Both episodes were directed by Dermott Daniel Downs.

Grant Gustin portrays Barry Allen / Flash, joined by series regulars Candice Patton, Danielle Panabaker, Carlos Valdes, Tom Cavanagh, Jesse L. Martin and Keiynan Lonsdale and recurring cast members Tom Felton, Violett Beane, and Jessica Camacho. Keith David and David Sobolov guest star as the voices of Solovar and Gorilla Grodd, respectively. In the first episode, Barry, Caitlin Snow, Cisco Ramon, and Julian Albert travel to Earth-2 to rescue Harry Wells from Gorilla City. They are captured and brought to Grodd, who says that he needs their help to stop Solovar. In the second episode, the Flash and his team must stop Grodd and his army of gorillas from destroying Central City.

The episodes originally aired on The CW. According to Nielsen Media Research, the first episode was seen by 2.78 million viewers and the second by 2.87 million viewers, consistent with ratings for the rest of the season. The episodes received a positive critical response, with critics highlighting the ambitious and entertaining storyline, the fight sequences and visual effects.

== Plot ==
On Earth-2, Harry Wells is captured when he runs through the woods in Africa. His daughter Jesse Wells explains to Team Flash on Earth-1 that her father was leading an expedition to Gorilla City which was ambushed and killed while Harry disappeared. Barry Allen remembers the news report during his visit in the future, in which it was revealed that Central City will be attacked by gorillas. He, Julian Albert, Cisco Ramon, and Caitlin Snow try to rescue Harry, but are captured by Gorilla Grodd. Telepathically speaking through Harry, Grodd asks Barry to assassinate his master Solovar (leader of Gorilla City) to prevent a planned invasion of Central City. Barry agrees to fight Solovar in the arena for the lives of the others; defeating him, he spares his life. Grodd uses Barry's victory to convince the apes that humans are dangerous, and plans to force Cisco to open a portal for him to Earth-1. Grodd seizes control of Gorilla City and prepares an invasion of Earth-1. The team asks Caitlin to kill Cisco to prevent Grodd from using him to open a portal, but she refuses. Barry has Caitlin use her ice powers to fake his death. When Grodd comes to check on the team, he finds Barry, lying on the ground, frozen and removes him from his cage for disposal. After Grodd leaves, Barry resuscitates himself and frees the others; they escape, returning to Earth-1. Jesse and her father reunite, and Wally West and Jesse recommit to their relationship. Julian asks Caitlin out on a date. Grodd, in full armor, assembles his army with a brainwashed Gypsy at his side.

The personalities of Harry and H. R. clash. Jesse tells her father that she intends to stay on Earth-1 with Wally, which Harry initially tries to prevent. Harry subdues Gypsy when she ambushes and tries to kill Cisco and Barry, and the team realizes that Grodd and his forces have reached Central City. Gypsy is held captive for a short time before Cisco allows her to return to her Earth. Using his powers, Cisco determines that the gorillas will attack the center of town. This turns out to be a distraction by Grodd, who uses telepathy to compel Joe West to shoot himself in the head, but Barry pushes Joe out of the way of the bullet in time. Grodd abducts a visiting army general. Barry considers killing Grodd the only way to stop him and change the future, but Harry encourages him to find a better way. Controlling the general, Grodd attempts a nuclear-missile strike on the city. Barry prevents the attack, and Grodd and his gorilla army invade the city. Cisco travels to Earth-19 to ask Gypsy for help. The speedsters distract the soldiers while Cisco and Gypsy bring Solovar to Earth-1; Solovar defeats Grodd and assumes leadership again. All the gorillas return to Earth-2 except Grodd, who is turned over to A.R.G.U.S. Gypsy kisses Cisco before she returns home, and Barry proposes to Iris. When he picks up dinner for Jesse, Wally visualizes Savitar running towards him.

== Production ==
=== Development and writing ===
Gorilla Grodd, first mentioned in the show's pilot, appeared in the first two seasons. At the end of the seventh episode of season two, "Gorilla Warfare", Team Flash lured Grodd to a dimensional breach and sent him to a jungle sanctuary on Earth-2 for gorillas who have been experimented on. In January 2016, executive producer Andrew Kreisberg said that he intended to wait to tell the next chapter of Grodd's story for a multi-episode arc. He compared Gorilla City to the storyline of Ra's al Ghul and Nanda Parbat from Arrow, noting "it's a long-term thing". In August 2016, Kreisberg confirmed Grodd's return in the third season of The Flash, saying, "Yes, we're going to be doing a two-part episode that takes place in Gorilla City."

In January 2017, it was announced that the two-part arc would air on episodes thirteen and fourteen of the series' third season. According to Kreisberg, "One of the episodes will take place in Gorilla City and one of them will take place on Earth-1". In February 2017, The CW said that the first part of the "Gorilla City" storyline would be entitled "Attack on Gorilla City" and would be written by Aaron Helbing and David Kob from a story by Andrew Kreisberg. The second part, "Attack on Central City", would be written by Benjamin Raab and Deric A. Hughes based on a story by Todd Helbing.

David Sobolov, the voice of Grodd, said that the character evolved since he was last seen in season two, which "makes the plot more interesting". Sobolov said, "I have a feeling that when he comes back, he's not going to be very giving or loving to the humans since they all betrayed him", adding "They do a great job of writing on [this] show and giving them a more intelligent gorilla gives them more possibilities". Carlos Valdes called the episodes' tone "one of fear, because when you suddenly find yourself in the cold African jungles of Earth-2 and you hear the sound of omnipresent gorillas roaring at you, it kind of makes you shake in your boots".

=== Casting ===
Main cast members Grant Gustin, Candice Patton, Danielle Panabaker, Carlos Valdes, Keiynan Lonsdale, Tom Cavanagh and Jesse L. Martin appear in the episodes as Barry Allen / Flash, Iris West, Caitlin Snow, Cisco Ramon / Vibe, Wally West / Kid Flash, H. R. Wells and Joe West, respectively. Cavanagh also plays Harry Wells from Earth-2. The guest cast for the episodes includes Tom Felton as Julian Albert, Violett Beane as Jesse Chambers Wells / Jesse Quick and Jessica Camacho as Gypsy; all are recurring characters in the series. In January 2017, Keith David was cast to voice Solovar, a longtime ally of the Flash in DC Comics and the leader of Gorilla City. David Sobolov confirmed his return as the voice of Grodd. In "Attack on Central City", Sean Poague appears as Accelerated Man, a speedster and Earth-19's version of the Flash, and Paul Jarrett was General McNally; both received co-starring credit.

=== Filming and visual effects ===
The episodes were filmed from December 2016 to January 18, 2017. Automated dialogue replacement took place in post-production at the beginning of February. Both episodes were directed by Dermott Daniel Downs, who directed the previous two Grodd-centric episodes "Grodd Lives" and "Gorilla Warfare". A placeholder for Grodd was used on-set to give the actors someone to react to, and Sobolov could see (and react to) their performances. Due to a prolonged snowfall in Vancouver, filming of the "Gorilla City" scenes had to be moved south of the original site. Visual effects for both episodes were handled by Encore Post. According to post-production producer Jeff Garrett, episodes with Grodd cost 50 percent more than other Flash episodes.

== Release ==
The first part, "Attack on Gorilla City", aired on February 21, 2017, and concluded with part two, "Attack on Central City", on February 28, both on The CW. The event was simulcast with the US broadcast in Canada on CTV for the first part, after which the series moved to CTV Two for the second part and the rest of the season. On May 31, 2017, the episodes became available for streaming on Netflix in the United States, along with the rest of the third season. Both episodes, along with the rest of The Flash's third season, were released on Blu-ray and DVD on September 5, 2017, including a behind-the-scenes featurette about the episodes.

== Reception ==
=== Ratings ===
Viewership and ratings per episode of Gorilla City
No.	Title	Air date	Rating/share (18–49)	Viewers (millions)	DVR (18–49)	DVR viewers (millions)	Total (18–49)	Total viewers (millions)
1	"Attack on Gorilla City"	February 21, 2017	1.0/4	2.78	0.9	1.96	1.9	4.75
2	"Attack on Central City"	February 28, 2017	1.1/4	2.87	0.8	1.81	1.9	4.68

=== Critical response ===
Scott Von Doviak of The A.V. Club wrote, "The two-part Gorilla City adventure serves as a showcase for ambition outstripping budget and ingenuity. Berlanti and company clearly want to deliver on the goofy anything-goes appeal of DC's Silver Age, and it's to their credit that they keep trying to pull off these fan-friendly events. It's a hit-and-miss proposition: for every giddy success, like the first visit to Earth-2, there's a clunky outing like this one, where the limitations of weekly television are laid bare. Still, I'd never want the creative team to stop swinging for the fences, even if the result is a harmless pop-up to the infield". Vinnie Mancuso of the New York Observer said that "'Gorilla City' was some of the most fun TV in a long time ... This two-part tale of a psychic gorilla gone rogue isn't going to win any Emmys—not even the CGI is that good—but it was a blast to experience". Mancuso described it as "somehow a perfect example of both High Art and Low Art. It was Exact Middle Art".

==== "Attack on Gorilla City" ====
Jesse Schedeen of IGN rated "Attack on Central City" 8.4 out of 10, saying that the episode "didn't quite reach the heights of last year's "Welcome to Earth-2"" but the episode "was hardly lacking in entertainment value" with "plenty of CG gorilla goodness" even if it was obvious "where the crew was cutting corners". He enjoyed the "heavy dose of Harrison Wells and [the] new wrinkles to Barry's ongoing 'fight the future' mission". Von Doviak graded the episode B+, saying that it "was never going to deliver the full-on comic book version of the title location, so it's pointless to gripe about the weekly version of The Flash not having the budget of a Planet of the Apes movie. The closest it comes is the closing scene, with Grodd and his troops clad in full battle armor, having found a way to invade Central City after all ... The episode has enough going for it that it's easy to forgive some of the visual shortcomings".

Chancellor Agard of Entertainment Weekly also graded the episode B+, saying that it "might not have been the most dramatic episode, since it was part one of a two-parter, it was still a very entertaining hour that benefited a lot from the change in scenery ... The trip to Earth-2 infuses The Flash with a level of suspense that's been missing for awhile, and it's clear from director Dermott Downs' many sweeping shots of the completely CGI'd Gorilla City that he's relishing the opportunity to transport viewers to this part of the DC Universe ... The Flash's battle against Solivar pushes the show's special effects budget to the limits. That being said, it doesn't make the fight any less entertaining". Carla Day of Collider gave the episode four stars out of five, calling it "a promising start": "Overall Grodd's plan was one of the strongest aspects of the episode and sets up next week's major gorilla vs. human battle on Earth-1. The letdown was the lack of intelligence shown by Team Flash at times ... The fight between Solovar and The Flash was impressive, especially for a CW show, as the stadium visuals reflected the epic scope of the event for Gorilla City".

==== "Attack on Central City" ====
Giving "Attack on Central City" 8.5 out of 10, Schedeen said: "The Flash wrapped up an ambitious two-part storyline in fine form this week. Once again the show was forced to rely on Gorilla Grodd and his gorilla army sparingly, but the final showdown between Grodd and Solovar offered a truly epic finish to the conflict. And along the way, there was plenty of amusing character drama and a subtle focus on the growing pressure Barry faces as he tries to protect Iris". Von Doviak graded the episode B−, calling it "another downbeat, self-serious exploration of team dynamics and speedster soul-searching"; "the promised gorilla invasion of Central City plays more like Waiting For Grodd-o for most of" the episode. He added, "The slugfest between Grodd and Solovar up and down the side of a skyscraper plays a bit like a cut scene from a King Kong video game, but it comes as a relief after the largely action-free episode leading up to it".

Agard said that "Attack on Central City" wasn't "as exhilarating" as the first episode. However, he felt that it "did a pretty good job of picking up the threads of part one, particularly when it came to the importance of hope. It's been a while since the show has embraced the optimism of its premise, so it was nice to see both Barry and Gyspy step up to the plate. Furthermore, I loved Harry and H.R.'s interactions, as Harry spent the entire episode reminding H.R. that he wasn't a genius. There was something weird about Tom Cavanagh's portrayal of Harry, who was grumpier than usual, but that's a quibble. Cavanagh is one of the show's best assets, and he makes H.R. work through sheer force of will". Agard gave the episode a B grade. Collider.com's Evan Valentine said that the episode "was an extremely solid episode of the Flash, one of the better installments of the season in fact. It managed to play well on the series strength, though it was also hampered by some pacing issues ... "Attack on Central City" was certainly ambitious. Dedicating an episode to the Flash team dealing with an army of sentient, super-powered apes from an alternate reality is a storyline that you'd expect from a comic book, but not so much from a prime time television show. Understandably, the show's budget didn't allow for the entire episode to be devoted to Flash fighting a telepathic gorilla twice his size, but thanks to the strength of the characters, we're able to forget about the special effect shenanigans and focus on the interactions they all have with one another". He gave the episode four stars out of five, praising "the 'balls to the wall' method that the creators have taken in attempting to bring a comic book to life here".
