= The Flash season 2 =

The Flash
- Season 2
- Home media cover
- Showrunners: Andrew Kreisberg; Gabrielle Stanton; Aaron Helbing Todd Helbing
- Starring: Grant Gustin; Candice Patton; Danielle Panabaker; Carlos Valdes; Keiynan Lonsdale; Tom Cavanagh; Jesse L. Martin
- No. of episodes: 23

Release
- Original network: The CW
- Original release: October 6, 2015 – May 24, 2016

Season chronology
- ← Previous; Season 1 Next → Season 3

The second season of the American television series The Flash, which is based on the DC Comics character Barry Allen / Flash, sees Barry recognized as a hero in Central City after saving the city, only to face a new threat from a parallel universe in the form of the speedster Zoom, who seeks to eliminate everyone connected to the Speed Force throughout the multiverse. It is set in the Arrowverse, sharing continuity with the other television series of the universe, and is a spin-off of Arrow. The season was produced by Berlanti Productions, Warner Bros. Television, and DC Entertainment, with Andrew Kreisberg, Gabrielle Stanton, Aaron Helbing, and Todd Helbing serving as showrunners.

The season was ordered in January 2015, and filmed from that July to the following April in Vancouver. Grant Gustin stars as Barry, alongside principal cast members Candice Patton, Danielle Panabaker, Carlos Valdes, Tom Cavanagh, and Jesse L. Martin also returning from the first season, and are joined by Keiynan Lonsdale. This season also introduces characters from Legends of Tomorrow, which was being developed as a spin-off.

The season ran for 23 episodes and premiered on October 6, 2015, airing on The CW until May 24, 2016. The premiere was watched by 3.58 million viewers, down from the first-season premiere but average for the series. The second season of The Flash received acclaim from critics, being viewed as an improvement over the first season, and finished as the 112th ranked show, slightly up from season one, with an average viewership of 4.25 million. The series was renewed for a third season on March 11, 2016.

== Episodes ==
The Flash season 2 episodes
No. overall	No. in season	Title	Directed by	Written by	Original release date	Prod. code	U.S. viewers (millions)
24	1	"The Man Who Saved Central City"	Ralph Hemecker	Story by : Greg Berlanti & Andrew Kreisberg; Teleplay by : Andrew Kreisberg & Gabrielle Stanton	October 6, 2015	3J5651	3.58
Ronnie and Stein turn into Firestorm and help Barry destroy the singularity, but at the cost of Ronnie's life. Six months later, Barry operates alone, using his speed to repair Central City while being embraced by the public as a hero; Cisco works in the police department alongside Joe, and Caitlin works at Mercury Labs. Barry evaluates a crime scene with a victim named Al Rothstein. At a ceremony, the Flash is attacked by Atom-Smasher, whose strength and size manipulation prove too much for Barry, who forces his mask off. Underneath the mask, Atom-Smasher is revealed to look exactly like Rothstein. Barry is convinced by Joe and the others that he needs help in taking down certain metahumans and Rothstein is defeated by over absorbing radiation. While dying, Rothstein tells Barry that he was sent to kill him by someone called "Zoom". Barry receives a flash memory from Harrison Wells' (Eobard Thawne) lawyer containing his confession to killing Nora. Henry is exonerated and released from prison, and leaves Central City so that Barry can focus on being the Flash. A man arrives at S.T.A.R. Labs, introduces himself as Jay Garrick and tells the team that their world is in danger.
25	2	"Flash of Two Worlds"	Jesse Warn	Aaron Helbing & Todd Helbing	October 13, 2015	3J5652	3.49
Jay explains to everyone that he is the Flash on a parallel Earth and that he was in a battle with a demonic speedster named Zoom when the singularity brought him to this Earth without his powers. Stein confirms the claim, describing their world as "Earth-1" and Jay's as "Earth-2". Zoom brings another metahuman from Earth-2 called Sand Demon, later identified as Eddie Slick, to kill the Flash. Cisco analyzes the "sand" left behind and has a vision of the previous fight, frightening him. After Slick kidnaps Officer Patty Spivot, Jay teaches Barry how to hurl lightning. Cisco uses his power to find Patty's location. Barry uses the lightning blast to turn Sand Demon's particles to glass, killing him. Patty reveals to Joe that Mark Mardon killed her father. She joins Joe's metahuman task force. Cisco divulges his ability to Stein, and convinces him not to tell anyone. Stein and Cisco are able to locate 52 breaches with the Earth-2, with the largest one being within S.T.A.R. Labs itself. Joe's estranged wife, Francine, pays him a visit. Stein collapses while talking. On Earth-2 it is revealed that the Harrison Wells of that world is alive and in charge of S.T.A.R. Labs.
26	3	"Family of Rogues"	John F. Showalter	Julian Meiojas & Katherine Walczak	October 20, 2015	3J5653	3.47
Jay creates a device that stabilizes the singularity and will allow him to return home, but he opts to stay to help Barry stop Zoom. Meanwhile, Lisa Snart shows up asking for Flash's help in rescuing Snart, whom she believes was kidnapped. Barry tracks down Snart, who is revealed not to be kidnapped but is working with his father, Lewis. Lisa states that Snart would never work with Lewis willingly, because the latter was abusive toward her when she was a child. Eventually, the team determines that Lewis placed a bomb inside of Lisa and threatened to kill her if Snart did not help him with his theft. Barry infiltrates Lewis' crew with assistance from Snart. Cisco successfully removes the bomb from Lisa, so Snart uses his cold gun to kill his father in retaliation. Snart is incarcerated in Iron Heights and Lisa leaves. Joe reveals to Iris that Francine is alive and a former addict. Stein turns into Firestorm, but with blue flames. Earth-2's Wells arrives at the lab through the breach.
27	4	"The Fury of Firestorm"	Stefan Pleszczynski	Kai Yu Wu & Joe Peracchio	October 27, 2015	3J5654	3.43
The team is able to temporarily stabilize Stein. Caitlin states that he needs to merge with a new person in order to survive. She identifies two potential candidates: a scientist named Henry Hewitt and a former high school football star named Jefferson Jackson. Hewitt is excited to merge with Stein, but the attempt fails and Hewitt leaves angrily, not knowing that his own metahuman powers have been activated. Jefferson initially refuses, but agrees when Hewitt goes on rampage. After the successful merger, the new Firestorm joins Barry in helping to take down Hewitt, who is incarcerated. Before departing with Jefferson, Stein encourages Cisco to tell the others about his powers. Meanwhile, Francine reveals that she is suffering from a terminal illness and only has months to live. Iris later confronts her for hiding the existence of the former's brother. In the meantime, Wells breaks into Mercury Labs and steals an unknown device. Later, Barry is attacked by a humanoid shark monster sent by Zoom, but is saved by Wells.
28	5	"The Darkness and the Light"	Steve Shill	Ben Sokolowski & Grainne Godfree	November 3, 2015	3J5655	3.87
Wells, who Cisco nicknames "Harry" to distinguish him from Thawne, reveals that he is responsible for the creation of the metahumans and Zoom on Earth-2. He states that he plans to help Barry's team stop Zoom and other metahumans. At the same time, a metahuman from Earth-2 called Doctor Light arrives and starts robbing banks. Barry recognizes her as the Earth-2 version of Linda. Later, Light attempts to kill Linda and take over her identity, but accidentally kills Linda's boss and is stopped by Barry's team in the process. Harry reveals Cisco's powers to the team, which Cisco uses to locate Light. Barry defeats her with the help of Harry. After locking Light up, they plan to use her to lure Zoom out and defeat him for good. Jay, who dislikes Harry and vice versa, thinks it is too dangerous and leaves the team. Meanwhile, Barry starts dating Patty while Cisco starts a date with a barista named Kendra Saunders. Cisco picks the nickname "Vibe" for himself. Back on Earth-2, it is revealed that Zoom has Harry's daughter captive.
29	6	"Enter Zoom"	JJ Makaro	Gabrielle Stanton & Brooke Eikmeier	November 10, 2015	3J5656	3.63
As the team works to find a way to stop Zoom, Doctor Light escapes from her containment cell. Instead, the Earth-1 Linda agrees to help the team by impersonating Doctor Light. Barry reveals his alter ego to Linda. Harry creates a speed dampening serum and the team stages a fight at one of the breaches in order to trick Zoom through. The attempt fails, as Zoom knew the plan. Instead, he goes after Linda, before fighting Barry. Zoom is much faster and easily overpowers Barry, showing him defeated with his unconscious body to the local news and the police station before ultimately returning to S.T.A.R. Labs. Zoom stabs Barry with his hand, but Cisco shoots him with the serum, which hurts Zoom, but still leaves him with enough speed to escape. Later, Harry reveals that Zoom has his daughter, Jesse, and that he came to Earth-1 to stop Zoom. Barry wakes from his injuries and discovers that he can no longer feel his legs.
30	7	"Gorilla Warfare"	Dermott Downs	Aaron Helbing & Todd Helbing	November 17, 2015	3J5657	3.46
Barry manages to recover from the paralysis, but is unable to use his powers due to the psychological trauma of Zoom exposing Barry's defeat to the city. Iris reaches out to Henry, who returns to help Barry overcome his fears. Wells formulates a plan to close all of the breaches, except one, through which Zoom can enter into the trap set for him. Cisco touches Kendra, but leaves after seeing a winged person in a vibe. Grodd returns, using scientists to steal various chemicals in the hopes of creating more gorillas with his level of intelligence. He later kidnaps Caitlin to help him with his plan. Harry dresses up as the Reverse-Flash in order to trick Grodd into thinking that his "father" is still alive. The plan works long enough for Harry to rescue Caitlin before they both escape. After Barry is fully recovered, they lure Grodd to one of the dimensional breaches and send him to a jungle sanctuary for gorillas that have been experimented on in Earth-2. Later, Cisco meets Kendra again, this time vibing and seeing her as the winged figure.
31	8	"Legends of Today"	Ralph Hemecker	Story by : Greg Berlanti & Andrew Kreisberg; Teleplay by : Aaron Helbing & Todd Helbing	December 1, 2015	3J5658	3.94
Vandal Savage arrives in Central City, seeking to kill Kendra. Barry goes to Star City and enlists the help of Oliver and his team to protect her. The team is visited by Malcolm who informs them that Savage is an immortal. Later, Kendra is kidnapped by Hawkman, but Barry and Oliver rescue her and capture Hawkman, who introducing himself as Carter Hall, tells them he and Kendra are soulmates who have been connected for millennia. The pair are destined to die, be reborn, and find each other in each lifetime. Carter also reveals that Savage has killed the pair several times, each time growing stronger. Savage acquires the Staff of Horus, a deadly weapon. Kendra unlocks her abilities and the team decides to regroup in Central City, where Oliver witnesses Samantha Clayton with her son, who is also his. Meanwhile, Caitlin and Harry create a serum that will temporarily increase Barry's speed so that he can defeat Zoom. Jay initially refuses to test the serum, but changes his mind to save Harry when the latter is shot by an unaware Patty, whom Joe later informs about the truth. However, Jay advises against using the serum on Barry. Note: This episode begins a crossover event that concludes on Arrow season 4 episode 8. The two episodes also set up Legends of Tomorrow.
32	9	"Running to Stand Still"	Kevin Tancharoen	Andrew Kreisberg	December 8, 2015	3J5659	3.55
Mardon breaks James Jesse and Snart out of Iron Heights in an effort to team up to kill the Flash. Snart declines and alerts Barry. Jesse and Mardon place bombs hidden in Christmas gifts throughout the city, threatening to set them off in family homes if Barry does not sacrifice himself. Wells, Cisco, and Jay find one of the bombs and alter its magnetic polarity; they send it into one of the dimensional breaches, which causes it to attract the remaining bombs, removing them from the city. With them gone, Barry subdues Mardon and Jesse, dissuading Patty from killing Mardon. Meanwhile, Iris and Barry tell Joe about the latter's son named Wally, who later shows up at Joe's. Caitlin and Jay start a romantic relationship. Elsewhere, Zoom is revealed to be sending metahumans in order to help Barry get faster so that Zoom can take the latter's speed force, which Harry reluctantly agrees to help Zoom with because of his daughter, Jesse.
33	10	"Potential Energy"	Rob Hardy	Bryan Q. Miller	January 19, 2016	3J5660	3.41
Cisco presents a new idea to slow Zoom down, telling the team about a metahuman, whom he has dubbed the "Turtle", who has the ability to stop the kinetic energy around him and slow everyone to a halt. After Barry fails to stop the Turtle, identified as Russell Glosson, at a diamond unveiling, the team sets a trap at an art exhibit. Barry invites Patty with the intention of telling her his secret, but Glosson is aware of the trap and almost kills Patty before escaping. Later, Glosson kidnaps Patty. The team tracks him down and Barry is able to generate enough speed to move through the kinetic waves to knock him unconscious and save Patty. Patty tells Barry that she is leaving Central City and Harry kills Glosson by extracting a portion of his brain matter. Meanwhile, Joe struggles to develop a relationship with Wally, who has been street racing in an attempt to earn enough money for Francine's medical bills. Caitlin discovers that Jay is dying of an illness caused by Zoom stealing his speed. They vow to stop Zoom to get Jay's speed back in order to cure Jay.
34	11	"The Reverse-Flash Returns"	Michael A. Allowitz	Aaron Helbing & Todd Helbing	January 26, 2016	3J5661	3.71
The team discovers Turtle's death and Jay suspects Harry. Cisco asks Harry for help in controlling his vibing abilities. The latter determines they are connected to Cisco's fear response and triggers a vibe which alerts the team that Eobard Thawne is back. Harry surmises that this version of Thawne is from a point in the future before he went back in time to kill Nora and was protected from being erased. Cisco has a vibe of the future, and the team learns that Thawne is planning to use tachyons to return to his time. Barry arrives and destroys the machine. After a race around the city, Barry stops Thawne and imprisons him at the particle accelerator. However, his capture causes a rupture in the timeline that threatens to kill Cisco, so Barry sends Thawne back to the future to save his friend. Meanwhile, Patty discovers Barry is the Flash but, when he refuses to acknowledge it, she chooses to leave the city. Iris learns that Francine's death is imminent and reconciles with her. Wally takes her advice to do the same.
35	12	"Fast Lane"	Rachel Talalay	Story by : Brooke Eikmeier; Teleplay by : Kai Yu Wu & Joe Peracchio	February 2, 2016	3J5662	3.66
Right before the particle accelerator explosion, Joey Monteleone was thrown into a tar pit and left for dead. Sealed away, he is freed two years later with the ability to turn his body into molten tar. He sets out to get revenge on those who attempted to kill him. Harry creates a device to siphon Barry's speed energy and attaches it to his suit. It steals a portion of Barry's speed. Wells gives the energy to Zoom, who demands the rest. Meanwhile, Wells and Barry also successfully find a way to close the breaches. While going after Joey, Iris is injured when Barry is too slow to save her. Wells tells the team about the device, asking to be returned to Earth-2 and have Barry seal the breaches so Zoom cannot re-enter. After stopping Joey, Barry informs Wells that the team will help the latter to save Jesse. In the meantime, Wally continues racing even after Francine's death.
36	13	"Welcome to Earth-2"	Millicent Shelton	Story by : Greg Berlanti & Andrew Kreisberg; Teleplay by : Katherine Walczak	February 9, 2016	3J5663	3.96
Before heading to Earth-2, Barry closes all but one of the breaches, which is at S.T.A.R. Labs. Using the last breach, Barry, Cisco, and Harry travel to Earth-2, but an energy surge destabilizes the breach and the trio get stuck on Earth-2. Barry decides to impersonate his doppelgänger to get more information on Zoom. He later meets the Iris and Joe of Earth-2 and learns that Iris, who is his doppelgänger's wife, works for the CCPD while Joe is a singer. Barry is attacked by Earth-2's Caitlin and Ronnie, known as Killer Frost and Deathstorm respectively. Joe is killed in the attack. Cisco attempts to help the police stop the pair, but is confronted by his own evil doppelgänger, known as "Reverb" and revealed to have greater powers, including control over nervous systems and manipulation of vibrations. Barry arrives and is stopped by Reverb and Deathstorm. Zoom arrives, kills Reverb and Deathstorm for harming the Flash, and then imprisons Barry. Meanwhile, a new metahuman named Adam Fells appears in Earth-1 Central City. Jay tells Caitlin that he invented Velocity-6, which is the real reason why he lost his speed. Caitlin develops Velocity-7, which Jay uses to engage Fells, who escapes.
37	14	"Escape from Earth-2"	JJ Makaro	Story by : Todd Helbing & Aaron Helbing; Teleplay by : David Kob	February 16, 2016	3J5664	3.90
On Earth-2, Zoom issues a demand to Central City to turn in Wells and attacks S.T.A.R. Labs to find Wells and Cisco; but the two escape with Barry-2. The trio updates Iris-2 on what happened with Barry-1. They decide to convince Caitlin-2 to help. After a fight, Caitlin-2 agrees to take the team to Zoom. They arrive and rescue Barry-1 and Jesse, but Zoom shows up too. They are able to escape by the help of Caitlin-2, who keeps Zoom frozen and unable to move, but a third unidentified prisoner, who tries to reveal something about Jay, is left behind. Barry-2 and Iris-2 leave Central City to hide from Zoom. Meanwhile, on Earth-1, Caitlin-1 creates "Velocity 9", which Jay uses to stop Adam, who gets incarcerated in Iron Heights. Caitlin-1 discovers that Velocity 9 can cure Jay. The latter, Caitlin, Iris and Joe stabilize the breach and allow Barry-1, Cisco, Harry, and Jesse to return, but Zoom stabs his arm through Jay and pulls him back through the closing breach to Earth-2.
38	15	"King Shark"	Hanelle Culpepper	Benjamin Raab & Deric A. Hughes	February 23, 2016	3J5665	3.80
While everyone tries to move on, the humanoid shark-monster that Harry stopped, known as "King Shark," escapes A.R.G.U.S. custody and heads for Central City to kill the Flash. John Diggle and Lyla Michaels, the new director, arrive to warn Barry. King Shark, later identified as Shay Lamden, shows up at Barry's home looking for the Flash, tracking Barry's electrical field. A.R.G.U.S. arrives and forces Shay to retreat. Later, Barry forces King Shark to chase him out on the water, where Barry creates an electrified underwater cyclone that subdues the latter, and allows A.R.G.U.S. to imprison him again, with Lyla planning to find a cure. Barry vows to open a breach back to Earth-2 to stop Zoom. Meanwhile, Barry and Wally find it hard to develop a relationship. After Caitlin becomes cold due to Jay's death, Cisco becomes scared that she will become Killer Frost; but she assures him that she is only dealing with her grief. Back on Earth-2, Zoom unmasks as Jay.
39	16	"Trajectory"	Glen Winter	Lauren Certo & Lilah Vandenburgh	March 22, 2016	3J5666	3.00
Barry starts training to get faster so that he can stop Zoom. While out with friends at a club for downtime, Barry and the other club patrons are robbed by an unknown speedster, who then escapes. The speedster turns out to be Eliza Harmon, a Mercury Labs employee who developed Velocity-9 from samples Caitlin gave her to help with Jay's illness. Operating under the alias "Trajectory", Harmon invades S.T.A.R. Labs, imprisons Barry, and demands more V-9. After she threatens Jesse's life, Wells and Caitlin make more of the drug for Harmon, who then speeds off to wreak havoc on the city. Barry manages to stop her before she injects more V-9 into her system. Barry watches as Harmon's speed becomes so intense that her lightning turns blue and she disintegrates. Jesse decides to leave the city to experience the world on her own and stop Wells from doing harmful things just to protect her. Based on what Barry saw from the overuse of V-9, the similarities between Zoom's speed and Jay's sickness, and Cisco's "vibe" (where he sees Zoom unmasked), the team concludes that Jay is Zoom.
40	17	"Flash Back"	Alice Troughton	Aaron Helbing & Todd Helbing	March 29, 2016	3J5667	3.39
Barry travels back in time to when Hartley Rathaway attacked the team, (Note: As depicted in the season one episode "The Sound and the Fury".) and switches places with his past self, in order to have Thawne help him solve the speed force equation. However, after a Time Wraith follows Barry to the past, Thawne deduces Barry's deception. Barry is able to convince Eobard to help him become faster. The wraith comes to the lab, where Caitlin and Cisco are forced to accept help from Hartley to deter the wraith. Afterward, the Barry from the current time arrives, forcing an explanation of the time travel event. Thawne provides the future Barry with the information about the tachyon technology, so that he can return to his time. As Barry prepares to make the jump through time, the Wraith arrives, forcing the past timeline's Barry to intervene, so that his future self can return. Back in his time, Barry is confronted by the Wraith, but a reformed Hartley arrives with his sonic gauntlets and defeats the wraith. Barry gives Iris a footage of Eddie recorded in the alternate timeline, advising her to move on with her life.
41	18	"Versus Zoom"	Stefan Pleszczynski	Joe Peracchio & David Kob	April 19, 2016	3J5668	3.03
Years earlier on Earth-2, a young Hunter Zolomon watches as his father murders his mother and is subsequently sent to an orphanage. In the present day, Barry tests the tachyon accelerator, and is able to enhance his speed four times greater than normal. Barry decides to re-open a breach back to Earth-2, and he believes that Cisco's powers are the key to opening the portals. Meanwhile, Caitlin reveals that Jay's Earth-1 doppelgänger is Zolomon and Wells, shocked to hear this, reveals that Earth-2 Zolomon was a convicted serial killer. Zolomon was receiving electroconvulsive therapy during the explosion, and was one of the many affected. With this revelation, the team confirms that "Jay" is Hunter. Cisco opens a breach, and Zoom immediately appears, chasing Barry back to S.T.A.R. Labs. There, Barry uses images of Zolomon's parents as a distraction to trap him, but Hunter escapes, claiming to be "the darkness". Zolomon kidnaps Wally and demands Barry's speed in exchange for Wally's life. Barry agrees, so Wells siphons all of his speed force, leaving Barry powerless. Zolomon injects the speed force into himself, and he kidnaps Caitlin with his enhanced speed before escaping. Note: This episode is a crossover with Supergirl season 1 episode 18. During his run sequence at the beginning of the episode, Barry inadvertently opens a breach, which leads to him asking how long he was gone when he gets back to S.T.A.R. Labs. The events of the Supergirl episode, "World's Finest", take place during Barry's time in the breach.
42	19	"Back to Normal"	John F. Showalter	Brooke Roberts & Katherine Walczak	April 26, 2016	3J5669	3.39
As Barry adjusts to life without his powers, Wells decides to leave the lab to look for Jesse. Shortly after speaking with her, Wells is attacked and kidnapped by Griffin Grey, believing him to be Thawne, who demands that Wells find a cure for his metahuman abilities. Grey has superhuman strength, but is also aging rapidly. Barry discovers that, when Grey uses his super strength, he accelerates the aging process. Barry, Joe, Cisco and Jesse manipulate Grey into exerting his powers until he ages and dies as a weak, old man; his body then reverts to its 18-year-old self. To fight Zoom, Wells offers to recreate the circumstances that gave Barry his speed. Meanwhile, on Earth-2, Zolomon tells Caitlin that he kidnapped her because he is in love with her. Caitlin encounters her doppelgänger, Killer Frost, who was captured by Zolomon as a reminder of Caitlin. Killer Frost convinces Caitlin to help her escape, but then attempts to kill her. Zoom arrives and kills Killer Frost, then warns Caitlin not to free the man in the iron mask. Later, Hunter decides to conquer the other Earths in the multiverse and takes Caitlin with him back to Earth-1.
43	20	"Rupture"	Armen V. Kevorkian	Kai Yu Wu & Lauren Certo	May 3, 2016	3J5670	3.34
While Barry keeps declining Harrison's offer, the team rigs a hologram of the Flash to stop crime around the city so that no one will know the truth. Henry returns to Central City and joins the team. He argues with Wells on the safety of another explosion. Hunter and Caitlin arrive back on Earth-1 with Hunter declaring the city under his control. Iris confesses her feelings to Barry. The Earth-2 version of Dante Ramon, called "Rupture", arrives on Earth-1 looking to kill Cisco, believing that Cisco killed his Earth-2 brother. Zolomon sends Rupture after the police to send the city a message. Barry and the police stop Rupture, but Zolomon arrives and kills the officers himself, as well as Rupture for failing. He then publicly announces the Flash's disappearance. Cisco and Dante-1 become closer. Barry finally agrees to Harrison's plan. During the process, Barry is seemingly vaporized, while Jesse and Wally are caught in the blast.
44	21	"The Runaway Dinosaur"	Kevin Smith	Zack Stentz	May 10, 2016	3J5671	3.52
Wally regains consciousness, but Jesse remains in a coma. Cisco has a vibe of Barry and realizes that he is still alive and in the speed force. Barry meets physical manifestations of the speed force in the form of faces familiar to him. The speed force informs Barry that he cannot leave unless he catches a mysterious moving figure, thus gaining his speed back. Cisco and Wells create a path into the speed force so Barry can escape, but the latter chooses to remain so he can earn his powers back. The speed force tells Barry that he cannot become the Flash again until he finally accepts Nora's death. Barry shares a moment with the physical manifestation of Nora, which allows him to finally catch the moving figure himself. With his powers restored and help from Cisco and Iris, Barry returns to S.T.A.R. Labs in time to save the team from the reanimated corpse of Tony Woodward. Afterwards, Barry uses a bit of speed force energy to bring Jesse out of her coma. Across town, Zolomon has assembled an army of metahumans from Earth-2, planning to unleash them on Central City.
45	22	"Invincible"	Jesse Warn	Story by : Greg Berlanti & Andrew Kreisberg; Teleplay by : Brooke Roberts & David Kob	May 17, 2016	3J5672	3.37
Caitlin returns to the team, but not without emotional trauma from being kidnapped. Zoom's army wreaks havoc across the city. Barry puts out several fires and takes out some of the metahumans to help the police. Back at S.T.A.R. Labs, Barry displays a level of confidence in stopping Zoom that concerns the team and each of them attempts to convince him to be more cautious. Among the attackers is Laurel Lance's doppelgänger, "Black Siren", who attacks various buildings around Central City using sonic blasts. Wally begins taking on metahumans trying to repay the Flash for saving him. The team creates a sonic amplifier tuned to the frequency of Earth-2. They discharge it and render all Earth-2 natives unconscious, allowing Barry to apprehend them all at once, although Zoom survives by escaping to Earth-2. Meanwhile, Cisco begins having vibes of a future Earth-2 being destroyed. Barry convinces Joe to let Wally be a hero. Later, Zoom returns and kidnaps Henry in front of the team. Barry races after them, revealing his identity to Wally, and is forced to watch Zoom kill Henry.
46	23	"The Race of His Life"	Antonio Negret	Aaron Helbing & Todd Helbing	May 24, 2016	3J5673	3.35
Zolomon escapes Barry by creating a time remnant. After Henry's funeral, Hunter challenges Barry to a race to determine who is faster, threatening to kill everyone Barry loves if he refuses. Harrison discovers that Hunter has a magnetar, a device that will destroy every planet in the Multiverse except Earth-1 which requires both their speeds to power. When an enraged and vengeful Barry refuses to back out, the team locks him in the Pipeline and force Zolomon back to Earth-2 themselves; but Hunter abducts Joe in the process. Wally discovers this and frees Barry, who agrees to Zolomon's race. As Barry races Zolomon around the magnetar, he creates a time remnant of himself who frees Joe and destroys the machine, but at the cost of his life. The "prime" Barry defeats Zolomon, who is then taken away by Time Wraiths for his crimes against the timeline. Barry rescues the man in the iron mask, who is revealed to be the real Jay Garrick, Henry's Earth-3 doppelgänger. Wells and Jesse return to Earth-2 with Jay, who plans to return to Earth-3 from there. Barry, still feeling broken and defeated, travels back in time and stops Thawne from killing Nora.

== Cast and characters ==
=== Main ===
- Grant Gustin as Barry Allen / Flash (Note: Gustin portrays Barry Allen (Earth-1) primarily and Bartholomew Allen (Earth-2) in a less prominent capacity.)
- Candice Patton as Iris West (Note: Patton portrays Iris West (Earth-1) primarily and Iris West-Allen (Earth-2) in a less prominent capacity.)
- Danielle Panabaker as Caitlin Snow (Note: Panabaker portrays Caitlin Snow (Earth-1) primarily and Killer Frost (Earth-2) in a less prominent capacity.)
- Carlos Valdes as Cisco Ramon / Vibe (Note: Valdez portrays Cisco Ramon (Earth-1) primarily and Reverb (Earth-2) in a less prominent capacity.)
- Keiynan Lonsdale as Wally West
- Tom Cavanagh as Harrison Wells (Note: Cavanagh portrays Harry Wells (Earth-2) primarily and Eobard Thawne's disguise in a less prominent capacity.)
- Jesse L. Martin as Joe West (Note: Martin portrays Joe West (Earth-1) primarily and Joseph West (Earth-2) in a less prominent capacity.)

=== Recurring ===
- John Wesley Shipp as Henry Allen and Jay Garrick / Flash
- Patrick Sabongui as David Singh (Note: Sabongui portrays the Earth-1 version primarily and an Earth-2 doppelgänger in a less prominent capacity.)
- Teddy Sears as Hunter Zolomon / Zoom / Flash (Note: Sears portrays the Earth-1 version primarily and an Earth-2 doppelgänger in a less prominent capacity.)
- Victor Garber as Martin Stein / Firestorm
- Wentworth Miller as Leonard Snart / Captain Cold
- Shantel VanSanten as Patty Spivot
- Vanessa Estelle Williams as Francine West
- Ciara Renée as Kendra Saunders / Chay-Ara / Hawkgirl
- Violett Beane as Jesse Chambers Wells

=== Guest ===
- Dominic Purcell as Mick Rory / Heat Wave
- Adam Copeland as Albert Rothstein / Atom Smasher (Earth-2) and Albert Rothstein (Earth-1)
- Rick Cosnett as Eddie Thawne
- Robbie Amell as Ronnie Raymond / Firestorm (Earth-1)
  - Amell also portrays Raymond's Earth-2 doppelgänger Deathstorm
- Kett Turton as Eddie Slick / Sand Demon (Earth-2)
  - Turton also portrays Slick's Earth-1 doppelgänger, a non-metahuman
- Malese Jow as Linda Park (Earth-1)
  - Jow also portrays the Earth-2 doppelgänger Doctor Light
- Michael Ironside as Lewis Snart
- Peyton List as Lisa Snart / Golden Glider
- Amanda Pays as Tina McGee
- David Hayter voices Shay Lamden / King Shark
- Demore Barnes as Henry Hewitt / Tokamak (Earth-1)
  - Barnes also portrays Hewitt's Earth-2 doppelgänger, a non-metahuman
- Franz Drameh as Jefferson Jackson / Firestorm
- Casper Crump as Vandal Savage
- David Ramsey as John Diggle / Spartan
- Emily Bett Rickards as Felicity Smoak
- Falk Hentschel as Carter Hall / Khufu / Hawkman
- John Barrowman as Malcolm Merlyn
- Neal McDonough as Damien Darhk
- Stephen Amell as Oliver Queen / Green Arrow
- Willa Holland as Thea Queen / Speedy
- Liam McIntyre as Mark Mardon / Weather Wizard
- Mark Hamill as James Jesse / Trickster
- Aaron Douglas as Russel Glosson / Turtle
- Matt Letscher as Eobard Thawne / Reverse-Flash
- Marco Grazzini as Joey Monteleone / Tar Pit
- Adam Stafford as Adam Fells / Geomancer
- Haig Sutherland as Griffin Grey
- Michael Rowe as Floyd Lawton / Deadshot
- Tone Bell as Scott Evans
- Audrey Marie Anderson as Lyla Michaels
- Allison Paige as Eliza Harmon / Trajectory
- Andy Mientus as Hartley Rathaway / Pied Piper
- Michelle Harrison as Nora Allen (Earth-1)
  - Harrison also voices Nora Allen's Earth-2 doppelgänger
- Katie Cassidy as Laurel Lance / Black Siren (Earth-2)

== Production ==
=== Development ===
On January 11, 2015, The Flash was renewed for a second season. With the commencement of production on the season, former Arrow and Ugly Betty writer Gabrielle Stanton was promoted to executive producer and showrunner; after having served as consulting producer and writer on the first season's finale "Fast Enough". However, it was later reported that series co-creator Andrew Kreisberg would be returning to sole showrunner duties at an unspecified time. That time was later proved to be at the start of 2016, "Potential Energy", when Stanton was no longer credited as being involved with the show. Aaron and Todd Helbing also served as the season's showrunners.

=== Casting ===
Main cast members Grant Gustin, Candice Patton, Danielle Panabaker, Carlos Valdes and Jesse L. Martin return from the first season as Barry Allen / The Flash, Iris West, Caitlin Snow, Cisco Ramon / Vibe and Joe West, respectively. Tom Cavanagh, who portrayed Eobard Thawne impersonating Harrison Wells in season one, also returned as a regular, playing Wells' Earth-2 doppelgänger. Rick Cosnett, a main cast member from season one, did not return as a regular because his character, Eddie Thawne, died in the season one finale. He instead returned as a guest star in the season premiere "The Man Who Saved Central City" in a dream sequence, and later in the episode "Flash Back", where Barry travels back to a time when Eddie was still alive. In August 2015, Keiynan Lonsdale was cast as Wally West, the unknown son of Joe, and Iris' brother. Gustin, Patton, Panabaker, Valdes and Martin also portray the Earth-2 versions of their characters in the episode "Welcome to Earth-2", while Cavanagh portrays Thawne impersonating the Earth-1 Wells in "The Man Who Saved Central City" and "Flash Back".

Discussing the casting of Lonsdale, Kreisberg stated, "Just like when we met Grant [Gustin] for the first time, we instantly knew Keiynan embodied all the heart and courage of a hero. We are so excited to be bringing this much-beloved character onto the show." It was always intended for Wally to be the son of Joe and brother of Iris, which differs from the character's comic history, as the producers disliked second seasons of television series that would introduce cousins of characters that were never previously mentioned, feeling it was "weird". Lonsdale originally auditioned for Legends of Tomorrow to portray Jefferson "Jax" Jackson.

Shantel VanSanten appeared in a recurring role as Barry's love interest Patty Spivot. VanSanten's character departed after the mid season premiere. The reason was initially reported as being due to scheduling conflicts with Shooter; VanSanten later revealed in an interview that she was set to return but "one of the showrunners at the time took a personal disliking to her".

In July 2015, it was announced that Teddy Sears would recur in the role of Jay Garrick, the Flash of Earth-2. However, later in the season it was revealed that his character was actually Hunter Zolomon / Zoom posing as Jay. Ryan Handley portrayed Zoom in costume prior to this revelation, while Tony Todd voiced Zoom.

=== Design ===
Maya Mani replaced Colleen Atwood as the costume designer for the second season and made slight changes to the Flash costume, such as changing the color of his chest emblem from red to white, being faithful to the Flash costume from the comics. Gustin stated that, around the time of filming the season's ninth episode, "we stopped gluing the mask to my face and switched to a mask that just slipped on and off with a zipper". While Zoom's costume in the comics is a verbatim replica of Eobard Thawne's yellow-and-red Reverse-Flash costume, the costume seen in the TV series is entirely in black. Kreisberg compared Zoom's appearance to that of the Marvel Comics character Venom, saying, "The Zoom outfit is much more organic than the Reverse-Flash suit. In a way, it's hard to tell if it is a suit or alive... There's no skin showing, for all you know there's a robot underneath, or dark energy."

=== Filming ===
Production on the season began on July 7, 2015, in Vancouver, British Columbia, and concluded on April 18, 2016.

=== Music ===
Composer Blake Neely returned as the primary composer for the second season. The soundtrack for the second season was released digitally on July 22, 2016 and in CD format on July 26, 2016. Neely also composed a theme when Gustin as Barry appeared on the eighteenth episode of Supergirl, "Worlds Finest". The theme was titled "World's Finest" when it was released on the Supergirl: Season 1 soundtrack.

All music composed by Blake Neely.

The Flash: Season 2 (Original Television Soundtrack) track listing
No.	Title	Length
1.	"How It Ended / Reluctant Hero"	4:35
2.	"Harrison's Will / Henry Released"	2:54
3.	"Jay Garrick Warns of a Man Called Zoom"	2:20
4.	"Stein Explains a Multiverse"	2:00
5.	"Family of Rogues"	2:42
6.	"Joe Tells Iris the Truth About Her Mother"	2:51
7.	"The New Firestorm"	1:44
8.	"Staged Fight to Lure Zoom"	2:19
9.	"The Face of Your Hero"	2:59
10.	"Grodd into the Breach"	4:04
11.	"Vandal Savage Arrives"	1:50
12.	"Who Is Kendra? / Hawkman Cometh"	3:07
13.	"Savage Attack, a Legend Is Born"	3:05
14.	"You Have a Son, His Name Is Wally"	2:02
15.	"Let It Snow Villains"	3:04
16.	"Sending Reverse Flash Back / Wells Betrays"	4:56
17.	"Welcome to Earth-2"	2:42
18.	"Hello, Breachers"	2:06
19.	"Hunting and Electrifying King Shark"	2:21
20.	"The Right Decision"	3:47
21.	"Who Is Hunter Zolomon?"	2:36
22.	"Ready to Save the World"	4:07
23.	"Stuck in the Speed Force"	3:54
24.	"Black Siren in Central City"	2:28
25.	"The Race of His Life"	3:59
26.	"I Will Wait for You"	3:54
Total length:		78:26

=== Arrowverse tie-ins ===
In October 2015, Arrow showrunner Wendy Mericle revealed that the producers of the Arrowverse had begun having someone track all the characters and plots used by each series, in order to make sure everything lines up, though Aaron Helbing noted in April 2016 that "sometimes the schedules don't line up exactly...and that stuff is out of our control", such as when Barry is shown using his abilities on Arrow that month, while not having them the same week on The Flash.

The second season of The Flash began to explore the concept of the multiverse, by introducing Earth-2, which features doppelgängers of the inhabitants in the Arrowverse (or Earth-1). In "Welcome to Earth-2" of The Flash, glimpses of the multiverse are seen, including an image of Supergirl star Melissa Benoist as Supergirl and an image of John Wesley Shipp as the Flash from the 1990 television series, implying that those two television series exist on alternate Earths to the Arrowverse.

The second annual two-way crossover with Arrow aired on December 1 and 2, 2015, where the Flash and the Green Arrow team up to take on Vandal Savage, who is looking for Kendra Saunders and Carter Hall, the reincarnations of Hawkgirl and Hawkman. Though Legends of Tomorrow did not have an episode as part of the 2015–16 crossover, the Arrow and The Flash episodes from this event did set up a number of characters who star and recur in that series. Casper Crump, Falk Hentschel and Peter Francis James debut in the crossover, as Vandal Savage, Carter Hall / Hawkman, and Dr. Aldus Boardman, respectively. Screen Rant's Alice Walker discussed how the annual Arrow/The Flash crossover suffered from also trying to set up Legends, which was "too much to ask from the already crowded storylines and ended up feeling like an exercise in synchronicity, with producers planting more seeds than they could reap. The crossover event was no longer a fun way to contrast the two shows; it now had to serve the much larger purpose of setting up an entirely new world."

==== Crossover with Supergirl ====
In February 2016, it was announced that Gustin would appear on the eighteenth episode of Supergirl, with Berlanti and Kreisberg, also Supergirl executive producers, thanking "the fans and journalists who have kept asking for this to happen. It is our pleasure and hope to create an episode worthy of everyone's enthusiasm and support." While no plot details on the episodes were released at the time, Ross A. Lincoln of Deadline Hollywood noted that "the in-universe reason" for the crossover was due to Barry's ability to travel to various dimensions, thus implying that Supergirl exists on an alternate Earth to the Arrowverse in a multiverse. "Welcome to Earth-2" confirmed this, showing an image of Benoist as Supergirl during a sequence where characters travel through that multiverse. The Earth that the series inhabits has been informally referred to as "Earth-CBS" by Marc Guggenheim, one of the creators of Arrow.

In "Worlds Finest", which aired on CBS on March 28, 2016, Supergirl is established as being in an alternate universe where the Flash helps Kara fight the Silver Banshee and Livewire in exchange for her help in returning home. The episode title was inspired by the World's Finest Comics series, in which Superman would team up with various other DC superheroes, including the Flash. The events of this episode take place between two moments in the eighteenth episode of The Flash season two, "Versus Zoom", which aired on April 19, 2016, in which Barry enters and exits a breach while wearing the tachyon device seen in this episode. The crossover required "a lot more logistical trickery" than the usual Arrowverse crossovers due to Gustin filming The Flash in Vancouver alongside Arrow and Legends of Tomorrow, while Supergirl is produced in Los Angeles. The producers chose to use the Flash as the character to crossover, due to his ability to travel between various Earths, and because it was "a little more fun at first to bring the veteran from that show to the chemistry of a new show." Berlanti stated that "in a perfect world", the crossover would have featured both Gustin and Amell's Green Arrow, "but logistically that would have been a nightmare to try and do both shows. We had to facilitate one." Gustin was optimistic that the crossover in 2016 would allow another crossover the following year with the rest of the Arrowverse shows.

The crossover episode received excellent reviews. Cliff Wheatley of IGN gave the episode an 8.6/10, stating "After the grim 'n' gritty Batman v Superman, Supergirl's "Worlds Finest" offered a fun, upbeat palette cleanser and one of the series' strongest episodes to date. Instead of the usual "beatdown" introduction, Supergirl and the Flash went straight to being superfriends, which was refreshing. Not only did Barry Allen fit perfectly in Kara's world, but actors Grant Gustin and Melissa Benoist had fantastic chemistry together onscreen. While the city's turnaround on Supergirl's Red K incident was a little sudden, overall, "Worlds Finest" was delightful." Stacy Glanzman of TV Fanatic gave the episode a 5.0 out of 5 stars.

== Marketing ==
The Flash surged 1,378% in buzz (highest year over year growth in conversation) from last year for its second season.

== Release ==
=== Broadcast ===
The season premiered on The CW on October 6, 2015, and ran until May 24, 2016.

=== Home media ===
The season began streaming on Netflix on October 4, 2016, and was released on Blu-ray and DVD in Region 1 on September 6, 2016.

Home media releases for The Flash season 2
The Flash: The Complete Second Season
Set details	Special features	
23 episodes and includes the Arrow crossover episode "Legends of Yesterday"; 6-disc DVD set/4-disc Blu-ray set; English (Dolby Digital 5.1 Surround); English SDH, Spanish and French subtitles; Subtitles: English	2015 Comic-Con Panel; 2015 PaleyFest; Deleted Scenes; Gag Reel; Behind-the-scenes visual effects featurettes for almost every episode; Featurettes; Star Crossed Hawks; Star Crossed Hawks: The Hunt for Vandal Savage; The Many Faces of Zoom; Chasing Flash – The Journey of Kevin Smith	
DVD release dates
Region 1	Region 2	Region 4
September 6, 2016	September 12, 2016	September 7, 2016
Blu-ray release dates
Region A		Region B
September 6, 2016		September 12, 2016

=== Copyright infringement ===
The second season of The Flash was the fourth most-torrented television show of 2016.

== Reception ==
=== Ratings ===
The second season finished as the 112th ranked show, with an average viewership of 4.25 million.

Viewership and ratings per episode of The Flash season 2
No.	Title	Air date	Rating/share (18–49)	Viewers (millions)	DVR (18–49)	DVR viewers (millions)	Total (18–49)	Total viewers (millions)
1	"The Man Who Saved Central City"	October 6, 2015	1.4/5	3.58	1.0	2.35	2.4	5.93
2	"Flash of Two Worlds"	October 13, 2015	1.4/4	3.49	0.8	2.06	2.2	5.52
3	"Family of Rogues"	October 20, 2015	1.4/5	3.47	0.9	2.05	2.3	5.60
4	"The Fury of Firestorm"	October 27, 2015	1.4/4	3.43	0.9	2.04	2.3	5.46
5	"The Darkness and the Light"	November 3, 2015	1.5/5	3.87	0.8	1.68	2.3	5.55
6	"Enter Zoom"	November 10, 2015	1.5/5	3.63	0.9	2.05	2.4	5.68
7	"Gorilla Warfare"	November 17, 2015	1.4/4	3.46	0.8	1.92	2.2	5.38
8	"Legends of Today"	December 1, 2015	1.4/5	3.94	0.9	2.12	2.3	6.07
9	"Running to Stand Still"	December 8, 2015	1.3/4	3.55	0.9	2.01	2.2	5.56
10	"Potential Energy"	January 19, 2016	1.3/4	3.41	1.0	2.06	2.3	5.48
11	"The Reverse-Flash Returns"	January 26, 2016	1.4/5	3.71	1.0	2.02	2.4	5.73
12	"Fast Lane"	February 2, 2016	1.4/5	3.66	0.8	1.86	2.2	5.53
13	"Welcome to Earth-2"	February 9, 2016	1.6/5	3.96	0.9	2.02	2.5	5.98
14	"Escape from Earth-2"	February 16, 2016	1.5/5	3.90	0.8	1.77	2.3	5.67
15	"King Shark"	February 23, 2016	1.4/5	3.80	0.9	1.96	2.3	5.77
16	"Trajectory"	March 22, 2016	1.1/4	3.00	0.9	1.96	2.0	4.96
17	"Flash Back"	March 29, 2016	1.3/5	3.39	0.9	1.92	2.2	5.31
18	"Versus Zoom"	April 19, 2016	1.2/4	3.03	0.8	2.03	2.0	5.07
19	"Back to Normal"	April 26, 2016	1.3/5	3.39	0.8	1.86	2.1	5.26
20	"Rupture"	May 3, 2016	1.3/5	3.34	0.8	1.92	2.1	5.25
21	"The Runaway Dinosaur"	May 10, 2016	1.3/5	3.52	0.8	1.82	2.1	5.34
22	"Invincible"	May 17, 2016	1.3/5	3.37	0.9	2.08	2.2	5.45
23	"The Race of His Life"	May 24, 2016	1.3/5	3.35	0.6	1.49	1.9	4.85

=== Critical response ===
The review aggregator website Rotten Tomatoes reported a 94% approval rating for the second season with an average rating of 7.84/10, based on 362 reviews. The website's consensus reads, "With distinctive visuals and a terrific cast, The Flash remains one of the strongest comic book shows on television." Metacritic, which uses a weighted average, assigned the season a score of 81 out of 100, based on 4 reviews, indicating "universal acclaim".

Reviewing for Collider, Dave Trumbore gave the season premiere a rating of 4 stars out of 5, saying, "All in all, a very good way to start season two after the strong run of season one." Mike Cecchini of Den of Geek! meanwhile rated the episode 3.5 stars out of 5, criticizing the episode's "unsettled" and "rushed" nature. He felt that the episode "seems so focused on getting this season off to a running start that it [...] doesn't give events time to breathe." Erik Kain of Forbes noted a "very big piece" missing in the absence of Harrison Wells, but felt that the episode was "an excellent start to the sophomore season of the CW's best super hero show." Although Henry Allen's abrupt exit was a common point of criticism amongst reviewers, Trumbore nevertheless felt that it was "a small price to pay for an otherwise cohesive, entertaining, and emotionally satisfying episode."

The episode "Welcome to Earth-2" received a number of positive reviews. Erik Kain said that it was "The Flash at its best. An engaging, funny, scary episode that hits all the right notes from start to finish." IGN's Jesse Schedeen rated it 9.7 out of 10, praising the concept of Earth-2, Barry's dramatic moments, the depiction of Deathstorm, Killer Frost, and Reverb, but criticized the need to kill off Reverb so soon. He concluded, "The Flash delivered one of its best episodes yet as Barry and friends took a hilarious but emotional trip to Earth-2." Angelica Jade Bastién of Vulture said the episode "marries incredible action sequences, amazing direction by Millicent Shelton, some of the cast's best acting (particularly from Candice Patton and Grant Gustin), lots of heart, and just the right number of nods to the comics. It is undoubtedly the best episode of the season, and just may be the best episode of The Flash yet." Dave Trumbore rated the episode 4 stars out of 5, saying, "This was an absolutely insane episode of The Flash, and that's saying something since this show is normally fast-paced and full of Easter eggs even on a relatively slow week." Entertainment Weekly's Jonathon Dornbush praised the scene where Barry talks to his Earth-2 doppelgänger's mother over phone, saying Gustin "has proved mightily adept at tackling Barry's grief, hope, and the many other emotions swirling around in regard to his mother and her death." Scott Von Doviak of The A.V. Club said, "Since its return from hiatus, The Flash has been sluggish and morose, and the Zoom arc has fizzled. 'Welcome to Earth-2' jump-starts both the storyline and the season as a whole [...and] is just about as good as The Flash gets."

Reviewing the season finale, Allison Keene of Collider directed specific praise to Gustin's performance, saying "Sometimes a great TV performer can come out of an already fantastic episode, but occasionally an actor can rise above the material, proving that even though the writers have let them down, the actor is going to make the most of what they've been given. That's exactly where we find ourselves with The Flash's head-scratching finale, which capped off a largely enjoyable but ultimately uneven second season. What has never been in doubt, though, is star Grant Gustin's ability to convince viewers that this all makes sense in an emotional, earnest, and often light-hearted way." In his review for Nerdist, Joseph McCabe concluded, "For all this season's faults, most of which came from repeating the major villain arc of season one, [...] there were moments in the last handful of episodes where Barry demonstrated more independent thought than the show often allows him. Coming up with his own ideas, for example, to defeat the villain of the week rather than relying on his friends at S.T.A.R. Labs. That's the Barry I want to see more of in season three.

A number of critics felt that the season as a whole suffered from the standards set by its predecessor, calling it "uneven" and criticizing the handling of the season's main villain. Collider's Kayti Burt gave the season 3 stars out of 5, saying, "The Flash finished off an uneven season with an uneven finale that couldn't overcome the burden of an underdeveloped, illogical villain. With Zoom, The Flash fell victim to a common drama mistake of a contemporary TV era: it prioritized the plot twist over the well-developed character arc." Jeff Jensen of Entertainment Weekly gave the season a "B−" grade, calling it "certifiably slumptacular" and said that the "bold" introduction of the multiverse did not meet his expectations. Jensen praised Barry's onscreen rapport with Joe but felt it was underutilized due to the introduction of Joe's biological son Wally, and criticized Barry's romantic fixation for Iris. He also criticized Zoom, saying, "He began as an alluring mystery but lost zip over time" and once his identity was revealed, "became a weak embodiment of generic villainy". Jesse Schedeen gave the entire season a rating of 8.6 out of 10, explaining, "This season met and occasionally even exceeded the heights of its predecessor. But it was also a more uneven and ultimately more flawed experience in the end."

=== Accolades ===
The Flash was included on multiple Best/Top TV Shows of 2015 lists, ranking on The Salt Lake Tribune's (4th), Omaha World-Herald's (7th), and IndieWire's (10th), as well as on un-ranked lists of Criticwire and Variety. In its second season, The Flash was nominated for 20 awards, winning five. The series was nominated for three Saturn Awards, winning Best Superhero Adaption Television Series for the second year in a row. The show was also nominated for three Leo Awards, winning again for Best Visual Effects in a Dramatic Series for the episode "Gorilla Warfare". At the 2016 Teen Choice Awards, the show gained six nominations with Gustin winning for Choice TV Actor: Fantasy/Sci-Fi.

Awards and nominations for The Flash season 2
Year	Award	Category	Nominee(s)	Result	Ref.
2016	Kids' Choice Awards	Favorite Family TV Show	The Flash	Nominated	
2016	Kids' Choice Awards	Favorite Male TV Star – Family Show	Grant Gustin	Nominated	
2016	Leo Awards	Best Direction in a Dramatic Series	J. J. Makaro ("Enter Zoom")	Nominated	
2016	Leo Awards	Best Visual Effects in a Dramatic Series	For episode "Gorilla Warfare"	Won	
2016	Leo Awards	Best Stunt Coordination in a Dramatic Series	J. J. Makaro, Jon Kralt ("Legends of Today")	Nominated	
2016	Teen Choice Awards	Choice TV Show: Fantasy/Sci-Fi	The Flash	Nominated	
2016	Teen Choice Awards	Choice TV Actor: Fantasy/Sci-Fi	Grant Gustin	Won	
2016	Teen Choice Awards	Choice TV: Chemistry	Candice Patton and Grant Gustin	Nominated	
2016	Teen Choice Awards	Choice TV: Liplock	Candice Patton and Grant Gustin	Nominated	
2016	Teen Choice Awards	Choice TV Actress: Fantasy/Sci-Fi	Danielle Panabaker	Nominated	
2016	Teen Choice Awards	Choice TV: Villain	Teddy Sears	Nominated	
2016	Saturn Awards	Best Superhero Adaption Television Series	The Flash	Won	
2016	Saturn Awards	Best Actor on Television	Grant Gustin	Nominated	
2016	Saturn Awards	Best Guest Star on Television	Victor Garber	Nominated	
2016	IGN Awards	Best Comic Book TV Series	The Flash	Nominated	
2016	IGN Awards	Best TV Hero	Grant Gustin	Nominated	
2016	IGN Awards	Best TV Villain	Tom Cavanagh	Nominated	
2016	IGN People's Choice Award	Best TV Hero	Grant Gustin	Won	
2016	Poppy Awards	Best Supporting Actor, Drama	Jesse L. Martin	Nominated	
2016	The Joey Awards	Young Actor in a TV Series Featured Role 11–16 Years	Octavian Kaul	Won	
2017	Leo Awards	Best Visual Effects in a Dramatic Series	Armen V. Kevorkian, James Baldanzi, Thomas Connors, Gevork Babityan, and Marc Lougee for "King Shark"	Won	
