= King Shark (disambiguation) =

King Shark is a supervillain appearing in comic books published by DC Comics.

King Shark may also refer to:

- King Shark (DC Extended Universe), a version of the character featuring in the DC Extended Universe film series
- King Shark (Arrowverse), a version of the character featuring in the Arrowverse television universe
- "King Shark" (The Flash episode), an episode of The Flash
