= Killer Frost (disambiguation) =

Killer Frost is a fictional character in DC Comics.

Killer Frost may also refer to:

- "Killer Frost" (The Flash episode), a 2016 episode of The Flash
- Killer Frost (Arrowverse), the title character of the episode
