= The Flash season 3 =

The Flash
- Season 3
- Home media cover
- Showrunners: Andrew Kreisberg; Aaron Helbing Todd Helbing
- Starring: Grant Gustin; Candice Patton; Danielle Panabaker; Carlos Valdes; Keiynan Lonsdale; Tom Cavanagh; Jesse L. Martin
- No. of episodes: 23

Release
- Original network: The CW
- Original release: October 4, 2016 – May 23, 2017

Season chronology
- ← Previous; Season 2 Next → Season 4

The third season of the American television series The Flash, which is based on the DC Comics character Barry Allen / Flash, a costumed superhero and crime-fighter with the power to move at super speeds, follows Barry as he deals with the consequences of his decision to save his mother, which creates a timeline called "Flashpoint", and the resulting emergence of a new foe in Savitar. It is set in the Arrowverse, sharing continuity with the other television series of the universe, and is a spin-off of Arrow. The season was produced by Berlanti Productions, Warner Bros. Television, and DC Entertainment, with Andrew Kreisberg, Aaron and Todd Helbing serving as showrunners.

The season was ordered in March 2016, and production began that July, lasting until April 2017. Alongside Grant Gustin, who reprises his role as Barry Allen, principal cast members Candice Patton, Danielle Panabaker, Carlos Valdes, Keiynan Lonsdale, Tom Cavanagh, and Jesse L. Martin return from the second season.

The first episode of the season premiered on The CW on October 4, 2016, and was watched by 3.17 million people, with the season consisting of 23 episodes. The series was renewed for a fourth season on January 8, 2017.

== Episodes ==
The Flash season 3 episodes
| No. overall | No. in season | Title | Directed by | Written by | Original release date | Prod. code | U.S. viewers (millions) |
|---|---|---|---|---|---|---|---|
| 47 | 1 | "Flashpoint" | Jesse Warn | Story by : Greg Berlanti & Andrew Kreisberg; Teleplay by : Andrew Kreisberg & Brooke Roberts | October 4, 2016 | T27.13101 | 3.17 |
After preventing Nora's murder, Barry returns with Eobard Thawne to the present and imprisons him in a cage that dampens his powers. In the new timeline, which Thawne dubs "Flashpoint", both of Barry's parents are alive; Joe is chronically in trouble at work; Cisco is a billionaire tech magnate; and Caitlin is a pediatric ophthalmologist. There is also a new Flash in Central City called Kid Flash, struggling with his own nemesis, Edward Clariss, known as "The Rival". Barry begins losing his memories of the original timeline due to the new one becoming permanent. After discovering that Kid Flash is Wally, Barry teams up with him and stops Clariss, but Wally is critically injured in the process. Realizing that the new timeline is worse for those closest to him, Barry is forced to let Thawne return to the past and kill Nora, resetting the timeline. Back in the present, Barry learns that the timeline did not reset exactly and Joe and Iris have not spoken to each other in months. Meanwhile, Clariss is confronted by a mysterious voice and finds the message "Alchemy" being scratched into his mirror by an invisible force.
| 48 | 2 | "Paradox" | Ralph Hemecker | Aaron Helbing & Todd Helbing | October 11, 2016 | T27.13102 | 2.80 |
Barry learns of multiple changes to the timeline: Iris has not forgiven Joe for concealing that her mother was alive, Cisco is angry with him for not altering the timeline to save his dead brother Dante, and he has a new CSI partner, Julian Albert, who does not like him. Barry decides to travel back to fix the damage, but is intercepted by Jay Garrick, who tells him that the timeline never resets exactly and he has to learn to live with his mistakes. Meanwhile, Clariss has visions of "Flashpoint" and locates the person responsible, Alchemy, who restores Clariss' powers and memories. Barry tells the team about the timeline's alterations before confronting Clariss at an abandoned warehouse. Alchemy is there as well, saying that he is preparing for a future event. Cisco arrives and helps Barry defeat Clariss, who is then incarcerated in Iron Heights. The team determines Alchemy is creating other metahumans from "Flashpoint" whom they need to track down. Cisco and Barry reconcile, as do Iris and Joe. Caitlin is secretly revealed to have cryokinetic powers. Inside his cell, Clariss is confronted by the voice of Alchemy for his failure before being killed by an unidentified metallic being.
| 49 | 3 | "Magenta" | Armen V. Kevorkian | Judalina Neira & David Kob | October 18, 2016 | T27.13103 | 2.67 |
Harry and Jesse return to Earth-1, where she reveals she has gained super speed from the second dark matter blast. Harry hopes everyone will dissuade her from using her powers. Elsewhere, foster child Frankie Kane develops metahuman magnetic powers that manifest as an alternate personality, Magenta, who attacks her abusive foster father. Julian confronts Frankie at the station and is nearly killed by Magenta. Barry learns from Magenta that she got her powers from Alchemy. She escapes and later goes to the Central City Hospital to kill her foster father by dropping an oil tanker on the building. Barry creates a vortex to hold the tanker in place, but is unable to confront Magenta simultaneously. Wells sends Jesse to help. She takes over the vortex while Barry talks Kane into gaining control over Magenta. Wally, grappling with disappointment over having no speed, realizes he is having the same dreams from "Flashpoint" that Kane describes. Wells tells Jesse that he will support her decision and presents her with her own speedster costume. Joe later shows Barry and Julian footage of Clariss being killed in his cell by an unseen force, manifesting only as a flying ball of white light.
| 50 | 4 | "The New Rogues" | Stefan Pleszczynski | Benjamin Raab & Deric A. Hughes | October 25, 2016 | T27.13104 | 2.80 |
Three years ago, Sam Scudder and Rosalind Dillon, former cohorts of Leonard Snart, were caught in the original particle accelerator explosion. In the present, Barry begins training Jesse on how to use her powers. Harry suggests the team locate a doppelgänger of his from another Earth to replace him on the team once he and Jesse leave. Scudder returns from being trapped in a mirror-like dimension with the ability to transport himself and others through reflective surfaces. He reunites with Dillon, who now has vertigo-inducing powers, and they go on a crime spree. Barry and Jesse (as "Jesse Quick") confront them, but are defeated after Barry ends up trapped inside a mirror by Scudder. Caitlin secretly uses her emerging ice powers to help Barry free himself from his predicament. He and Jesse then successfully capture Scudder and Dillon. After evaluating the candidates, the team recruits the friendly and eccentric H. R. Wells of Earth-19, despite Harry's misgivings. Jesse and her father then return to Earth-2, but not before Harry apprises Cisco of Barry's suspicious escape. That night, Caitlin accidentally freezes the water in her shower and her appearance begins showing signs of her Earth-2 doppelgänger, Killer Frost.
| 51 | 5 | "Monster" | C. Kim Miles | Zack Stentz | November 1, 2016 | T27.13105 | 2.77 |
Without informing the others, Caitlin visits her estranged mother, Carla, at her medical research company to have her powers examined, but leaves after attacking another scientist who intended to exploit her condition. Meanwhile, a gigantic creature repeatedly appears and disappears on the streets of Central City. Cisco grows suspicious of the newly-recruited H. R. when he does not provide much help in battling the monster. The monster is revealed to be simply a hologram operated by a bullied 15-year-old boy wanting to create fear in others. Barry exposes the deception in time to keep police snipers from harming civilians and prevents Julian from shooting the boy, whom he mistakes for a metahuman. H. R. is revealed to have no technical knowledge at all. He admits that he is only an "idea man" for his tech company on Earth-19 and that he came to Earth-1 primarily to get material for a novel. The team decides to give him a chance to prove his worth as an assistant. A badly shaken Julian reconciles his differences with Barry. Carla informs Caitlin that her powers are increasing and that she needs to stop using them or her condition will become irreversible.
| 52 | 6 | "Shade" | JJ Makaro | Emily Silver & David Kob | November 15, 2016 | T27.13106 | 3.01 |
When Wally relates his recent dreams of being Kid Flash, Barry reveals what happened to him during "Flashpoint". A metahuman H. R. nicknamed "Shade" murders a stockbroker. Caitlin reveals her powers to Cisco and has him "vibe" her future. Cisco sees himself fighting Killer Frost. Alchemy summons Wally to him, so the team locks Wally in the particle accelerator for his own safety. Meanwhile, Barry and the others stop Shade's next attack and capture him. Cisco forces Caitlin to reveal the truth to the team and Barry privately confesses to her that her powers are a result of "Flashpoint". Wally volunteers to lead the team to Alchemy to capture the villain and stop the memories, which are causing him pain. Barry, Joe, and a S.W.A.T. team locate Alchemy and his followers and surround them. The metallic being that killed Clariss appears and attacks them, revealing himself to be a speedster that only Barry can see. As Barry fights their attacker, Alchemy entices Wally to pick up his fallen energy weapon, which encases Wally in a crystal cocoon. Calling himself "Savitar", the speedster overpowers Barry and prepares to stab him with a blade from his arm.
| 53 | 7 | "Killer Frost" | Kevin Smith | Story by : Judalina Neira; Teleplay by : Andrew Kreisberg & Brooke Roberts | November 22, 2016 | T27.13107 | 2.95 |
Savitar opts to drag Barry across the city, while battering him to demonstrate his superiority. Cisco and Caitlin arrive to rescue Barry and Savitar flees. Caitlin, with her Killer Frost persona having taken over, violently interrogates one of Alchemy's followers at CCPD headquarters. When Julian catches her, she coerces him to find the other acolytes so they can lead her to Alchemy, who can presumably remove her powers. Barry and Cisco track her down and imprison her, but the team is fractured after she reveals Barry's role in Dante's death by creating "Flashpoint." Greatly concerned and disregarding the consequences, Joe breaks Wally out of the cocoon. Wally emerges with unmanageable speed powers and he races away in a confused state. Barry offers his life to Caitlin for her freedom in a successful attempt to restore her sanity and gain her help in treating Wally. Joe and Barry locate Wally, stabilizing his condition with Caitlin's serum, and Wally soon embraces his new abilities. Julian agrees to protect Caitlin from the police, but forces Barry to resign from the CCPD in exchange, believing him morally unfit for wanting Caitlin shielded. Julian is later revealed to be Alchemy and working for Savitar.
| 54 | 8 | "Invasion!" | Dermott Downs | Story by : Greg Berlanti & Andrew Kreisberg; Teleplay by : Aaron Helbing & Todd Helbing | November 29, 2016 | T27.13108 | 4.15 |
Barry investigates a meteor crash outside Central City that turns out to be a spaceship from which aliens emerge. Lyla tells the team that the "Dominators" landed previously in the 1950s, but then mysteriously departed. Needing help, Barry assembles the original Team Arrow, Thea Queen, the Legends, and Supergirl. The team begins training at a S.T.A.R. Labs facility, sparring against Supergirl to prepare for combat against the aliens. Cisco reveals a message to Rip Hunter from Barry's future self, which exposes Barry's manipulation of the timeline and how it affected other team members. Oliver, Supergirl, Felicity, Martin, and Jefferson are left as the only ones who still trust Barry. The Dominators abduct the President. Supergirl leads most of the others in a rescue effort, but the Dominators kill the President and ensnare everyone with a mind control device. The controlled heroes return and attack S.T.A.R. Labs. While Oliver holds them off, Barry lures Supergirl to the device and manipulates her into destroying it, freeing everyone. The team decides to trust Barry again. Sara, Ray, Diggle, Thea, and Oliver are then teleported away before Barry can intervene. Note: This episode begins a crossover event that continues on Arrow season 5 episode 8 and concludes on Legends of Tomorrow season 2 episode 7.
| 55 | 9 | "The Present" | Rachel Talalay | Story by : Aaron Helbing & Todd Helbing; Teleplay by : Lauren Certo | December 6, 2016 | T27.13109 | 3.14 |
Barry asks Jay Garrick for help against Savitar. The two heroes locate and defeat Alchemy and return his weapon to its box, causing Savitar to disappear before he can kill Jay. Discovering Julian to be Alchemy, Barry reveals his own identity to him to get further information. Julian relates how he located the Philosopher's stone following a vision of his dead sister and that he has been having blackouts ever since. Savitar manifests through Cisco using visions of Dante and fights Barry and Wally, but Caitlin manages to convince Cisco to close the box again. The team communicates with Savitar through Julian, who claims that Barry, in the future, will imprison him. He also says that one teammate will betray them, one will fall, and a third will suffer a fate worse than death. Trying to end Savitar's threat, Barry and Jay throw the box into the speed force but, in the process, Barry is thrown five months into the future and witnesses Savitar killing Iris. Jay tells Barry that the future is not fixed. Wally is given his own "Kid Flash" costume, Julian gets Barry's job back for him, and Barry rents a new apartment for himself and Iris.
| 56 | 10 | "Borrowing Problems from the Future" | Millicent Shelton | Grainne Godfree & David Kob | January 24, 2017 | T27.13110 | 2.72 |
Barry has been having nightmares about Iris's murder. Jared Morillo attempts a robbery, but is confronted by Barry, who recalls a news report during his visit in the future when Barry captures Plunder. The distraction allows Morillo to overpower Barry and escape. H. R. launches the museum, but no one visits it. In a second confrontation, Wally intervenes and captures Morillo, gaining praise by everyone except Barry. He eventually reveals the future he saw to everyone but Joe. The team decides to change the course of other events in order to prevent Iris's death. Using Cisco, Barry accesses the future memory, in which the news reveal that the S.T.A.R. Labs museum will close and Caitlin will become Killer Frost. Morillo escapes, and Barry decides to change the first event by letting Wally capture him. Cisco relaunches the museum, starting with an exhibition for elementary school students. Julian is persuaded by Caitlin to join the team. A mysterious woman from another Earth arrives, searching for H. R.
| 57 | 11 | "Dead or Alive" | Harry Jierjian | Story by : Benjamin Raab & Deric A. Hughes; Teleplay by : Zack Stentz | January 31, 2017 | T27.13111 | 3.06 |
An Earth-19 bounty hunter named Gypsy, possessing powers similar to Cisco's, arrives on Earth-1 intending to take H. R. back to Earth-19 for trial and execution, as inter-dimensional travel is forbidden there. Cisco demands a trial by combat for H. R.'s life, which she accepts. As the duel is to the death, Barry and H. R. try to ambush Gypsy to save Cisco, but she easily defeats them. Meanwhile, determined to leave a legacy, Iris persuades Wally to help her bust an arms dealer. While he is out scouting, she confronts the dealer, seemingly unafraid of death. Wally manages to save her. Julian discovers a flaw in Gypsy's fighting style. Cisco exploits this weakness during their battle, which allows him to defeat her. Cisco spares Gypsy's life, but she makes it clear that H. R. can never return to Earth-19, since she will state that she killed him. Joe gets angry with Iris and is suspicious of her lack of fear. Barry plots to have Wally increase his speed so that Wally can save Iris from Savitar.
| 58 | 12 | "Untouchable" | Rob Hardy | Brooke Roberts & Judalina Neira | February 7, 2017 | T27.13112 | 2.91 |
Barry and Wally continue their training in order to save Iris from Savitar. They race against each other, and Barry wins by phasing through a building. Julian finds a decayed corpse that was murdered just eight hours ago. He confidently informs Joe that this is the work of a metahuman. The body is taken to S.T.A.R. Labs for investigation, where Caitlin and Julian observe it turning to ash. Iris confesses to Barry that she is afraid of her future. Clive Yorkin, the metahuman responsible for the disintegrated corpse, attacks Joe and is revealed to be targeting the police who arrested him in Flashpoint. The metahuman tries to disintegrate a bridge on the train Joe is on, forcing Barry to phase the train through the wreckage of the bridge. Barry teaches Wally how to phase, which Wally uses to expose the meta to his blood and strip him of his powers. Joe insists that everyone be honest with him from then on after learning of Iris's future death. While practicing phasing, Wally is shocked to see Jesse coming through a portal. Jesse says her father has been abducted by Grodd and taken to Gorilla City.
| 59 | 13 | "Attack on Gorilla City" | Dermott Daniel Downs | Story by : Andrew Kreisberg; Teleplay by : Aaron Helbing & David Kob | February 21, 2017 | T27.13113 | 2.78 |
Harry is captured while running through the woods. Jesse explains that he was leading an expedition to Gorilla City that was ambushed and killed while Harry disappeared. Barry recalls that in the future Central City will be attacked by gorillas. He, Julian, Cisco, and Caitlin go to rescue him but are captured by Grodd. Speaking through Harry, Grodd asks Barry to help him usurp his master Solovar. Barry agrees to fight Solovar in the arena for the lives of the others and wins, but refuses to kill him. Grodd seizes control of Gorilla City and prepares an invasion of Earth-1. Cisco asks Caitlin to kill him so Grodd cannot open a portal, but she refuses. Barry fakes his death and Grodd removes him from his cage. He resuscitates himself and frees the others, and they return to Earth-1. Jesse and her father reunite and Wally and Jesse recommit to their relationship. Julian asks Caitlin out on a date. Grodd assembles his army with Gypsy, who was brainwashed, at his side.
| 60 | 14 | "Attack on Central City" | Dermott Daniel Downs | Story by : Todd Helbing; Teleplay by : Benjamin Raab & Deric A. Hughes | February 28, 2017 | T27.13114 | 2.87 |
Jesse informs her father that she intends to stay on Earth-1 with Wally, which Harry initially tries to prevent. Gypsy attacks Team Flash, but is subdued and revealed to be controlled by Grodd, whose forces have reached the city. Using his powers, Cisco determines that the gorillas will attack the center of town. This turns out to be a distraction for Grodd to abduct a visiting Army general. Barry contemplates killing Grodd as the only way to permanently stop him and also change the future, but Harry encourages him to find another way. Taking control of the general, Grodd attempts a nuclear missile strike on the city. Barry prevents the attack, so Grodd and his gorilla army invade the city themselves. Cisco travels to Earth-19 to ask for Gypsy's help. The speedsters distract the soldiers while Cisco and Gypsy bring Solovar to Earth-1, who defeats Grodd and assumes leadership once again. The gorillas return to Earth-2, with the exception of Grodd, who is turned over to A.R.G.U.S. Gypsy kisses Cisco, before returning to Earth-19. Barry proposes to Iris. Later, Wally visualizes Savitar confronting him.
| 61 | 15 | "The Wrath of Savitar" | Alexandra La Roche | Andrew Kreisberg & Andrew Wilder | March 7, 2017 | T27.13115 | 2.52 |
Wally continues having visions of Savitar and, after a physical altercation with him, finally admits this to the team. The team attempts to question Savitar via Julian, who acts as a conduit again. Savitar casts doubt on whether the Philosopher's Stone is truly lost to the speed force. Caitlin confesses that she kept part of the Philosopher's Stone, hoping to use it to remove her powers. Barry and the team figure out that Savitar is trapped inside the speed force but Wally is at home with Jesse when they realize this. Wally, after being confronted by Savitar who appears as a vision of his mother, steals the stone fragment from the lab, creates a portal, and launches the fragment into the speed force, believing this will exile Savitar for good. Barry arrives just as the portal draws Wally into it, trapping him in the speed force. Savitar, having successfully manipulated Wally, emerges from the speed force and fights Barry, taunting him by boasting he will not kill him before Barry watches Iris die before his eyes. Barry breaks off Savitar's arm blade using his vibrating hand, causing Savitar to retreat.
| 62 | 16 | "Into the Speed Force" | Gregory Smith | Brooke Roberts & Judalina Neira | March 14, 2017 | T27.13116 | 2.39 |
Feeling responsible for everything bad that is happening, and that Wally is suffering inside the speed force, Barry decides to rescue him. Cisco vibes Barry into the speed force, where he encounters manifestations of friends and foes who had previously sacrificed their lives. Less accommodating than before, they push Barry to understand true sacrifice and that he must be the one to save Iris in the future. Barry is also confronted by his former enemy, Hunter Zolomon, and defeats him. Jay Garrick, having been contacted by Cisco, joins Barry inside the speed force and voluntarily takes Wally's place so Barry and Wally can escape. Meanwhile, Jesse uses the armor shard to locate and face Savitar by herself, managing to wound him with it before he escapes. Later, Jesse decides to go to Earth-3 to protect it until the team can free Jay from the speed force. Barry admits to Iris that even though he loves her, he proposed for the wrong reasons and suggests they take some time apart.
| 63 | 17 | "Duet" | Dermott Daniel Downs | Story by : Greg Berlanti & Andrew Kreisberg; Teleplay by : Aaron Helbing & Todd Helbing | March 21, 2017 | T27.13117 | 2.71 |
J'onn J'onzz and Mon-El arrive on Earth-1 with a comatose Kara. The Music Meister attacks and places Barry in a similar coma. He wakes up in a musical world and finds Kara. Meister tells them that if they follow the script, they will return to the real world. Barry and Kara are forced to work as singers in a nightclub run by gangster Cutter Moran. Digsy Foss and his husband are two gangsters opposing Moran. Barry and Kara find Moran's son, Tommy, and Foss's daughter, Iris, in a forbidden relationship. Kara and Barry convince the pair to reveal their love, also helping Barry and Kara to realize their own mistakes. Moran, Foss and his husband subsequently decide to go to war. Barry and Kara are shot in the crossfire, but Cisco, Mon-El and Iris vibe into their world to save them, allowing Barry and Kara to admit their loves for Iris and Mon-El. They wake up in S.T.A.R. Labs, and Meister reveals that he just wanted them to realize their love. Kara's team returns to Earth-38, and Barry and Iris move back in together. Barry re-proposes to Iris, who accepts. Note: This episode is a crossover with Supergirl episode "Star-Crossed".
| 64 | 18 | "Abra Kadabra" | Nina Lopez-Corrado | Story by : Andrew Kreisberg; Teleplay by : Brooke Roberts & David Kob | March 28, 2017 | T27.13118 | 2.39 |
Abra Kadabra, a criminal from the 64th century, comes to Central City, stealing from numerous tech companies and killing two guards. Gypsy returns, in pursuit of Kadabra. Kadabra offers the team the identity of Savitar in exchange for his freedom. Against Gypsy's wishes, a desperate Joe releases Kadabra, who escapes to Thawne's time vault after Gypsy fails to stop him and retrieves a power source. Kadabra also triggers an explosion that critically injures Caitlin. Refusing to take off the necklace suppressing her powers, even though doing so could save her life, Caitlin asks Julian to perform surgery with her guidance instead. Kadabra attempts to return to his own time, having used the stolen technology to build his own time machine, but he is foiled by the team with Gypsy's help. Barry decides that the only way to save Iris' life is by traveling to the future. Later, Caitlin, who was still recovering, loses consciousness and begins convulsing, before her vital signs flatline. A distraught Julian rips the necklace from her neck and her vital signs return to normal, as her injuries heal rapidly. She awakens, but in the guise of Killer Frost, and starts attacking the group with her ice powers.
| 65 | 19 | "The Once and Future Flash" | Tom Cavanagh | Carina Adly MacKenzie | April 25, 2017 | T27.13119 | 2.67 |
Killer Frost destroys the necklace. Barry travels to 2024, where he learns that Cisco lost his powers after Killer Frost shattered his hands and forced him to use mechanical prosthetics, H. R. has become a successful novelist, Julian works at Iron Heights tending to Killer Frost, Wally is catatonic with a shattered spine, Joe is depressed, and future Barry is a recluse hiding at S.T.A.R. Labs. In his absence, Top and Mirror Master have taken over Central City. Barry fails to learn Savitar's identity. Cisco secretly uses a device to prevent Barry from returning to the past, hoping he will put things right. Barry rounds up Julian, Joe, and H. R., reuniting Team Flash. Top and Mirror Master overwhelm Barry with their powers but, after overhearing him, future Barry uses Cisco's device to negate the villains' abilities, helping to defeat them. Future Barry gives Barry information and tells him to find a physicist named Tracy Brand, who developed a speed force-based trap years after Iris' death. In the present, Killer Frost meets with Savitar. She is reluctant to trust him, but changes her mind when Savitar's armor opens up and he steps out, revealing his identity to her.
| 66 | 20 | "I Know Who You Are" | Hanelle Culpepper | Bronwen Clark & Joshua V. Gilbert | May 2, 2017 | T27.13120 | 2.69 |
Barry, Cisco, and H. R. visit Tracy to seek her help in making a trap for Savitar; they are interrupted by Killer Frost, who attempts to kill Tracy, but is defeated before she escapes. Tracy goes to S.T.A.R. Labs with Team Flash and is shown her future. Killer Frost later decides to kidnap Joe's girlfriend, Cecile, and demand Tracy in exchange. Killer Frost's plan fails, leading to a battle between her and Cisco. Defeated, she is whisked away by Savitar, but not before Cisco draws some of her blood in order to potentially make a cure for her powers. Meanwhile, Joe admits his love to Cecile and tells her about Barry and Wally's alter egos. H. R. develops feelings for Tracy. Later, Tracy, inspired by the events, plans to build a trap for Savitar, while Barry has a revelation regarding Savitar's identity, given how much Savitar knows about everyone, and confronts him outside the city. Savitar confirms Barry's new assumption and reveals himself to be a future version of Barry.
| 67 | 21 | "Cause and Effect" | David McWhirter | Judalina Neira & Lauren Certo | May 9, 2017 | T27.13121 | 2.71 |
Savitar explains that he is a time remnant of Barry, created by his future self while fighting Savitar. After being shunned by Team Flash, the time remnant became depressed and ran back in time to ultimately become Savitar. He explains that he needs to kill Iris so that Barry will be forced to create him in the future. Cisco proposes they stop Savitar from remembering any of their strategies by stopping Barry from creating new memories, but miscalculations cause Barry to lose his memory. Savitar also loses all of his memories, resulting in Wally's powers disappearing, since Savitar never gave them to him. A pyromaniac named Lucious Coolidge gets released because of Barry's inability to testify correctly. Killer Frost helps Cisco and Julian develop a way for Barry to regain his memories so that Savitar can also. When Coolidge starts a fire, Iris helps Barry regain his memories in time to stop the fire with assistance from Wally. Tracy and H. R. develop a romance. She then shows the team the completed speed force trap, which requires a high amount of energy. The final scene cuts to a room that has an alien power source, as well as King Shark.
| 68 | 22 | "Infantino Street" | Michael Allowitz | Story by : Andrew Kreisberg; Teleplay by : Grainne Godfree | May 16, 2017 | T27.13122 | 2.48 |
With 24 hours left before Iris dies, Team Flash learns that there is only one energy source that can power the "Speed Force Bazooka"; a salvaged Dominator technology held by A.R.G.U.S. However, Lyla refuses to hand it over because of her mistrust of Barry due to his creation of Flashpoint. Barry then recruits Snart from 1892, when he was travelling with the Legends, to help him break into A.R.G.U.S. and steal the device. In the process, A.R.G.U.S. agents capture Barry and Snart, but Lyla, seeing the kindness in Barry's actions, allows him to take the device. Snart advises Barry to use the goodness in him to defeat Savitar. Tracy decides to join the team. Cisco vibes about his battle with Killer Frost and leaves to fight her. Joe hides Iris from Savitar on Earth-2 with Harry and Wally but Savitar tricks H. R. into revealing her location by pretending to be Barry, then goes to Earth-2 and kidnaps her. Barry uses the "Speed Force Bazooka" on Savitar, but it fails when Savitar counteracts it with the Philosopher's Stone, which is made out of calcified speed force energy. Savitar then stabs Iris in the back, seemingly killing her, before escaping.
| 69 | 23 | "Finish Line" | David McWhirter | Aaron Helbing & Todd Helbing | May 23, 2017 | T27.13123 | 3.04 |
H. R. reveals he swapped places with Iris and dies. Realizing his mistake, Savitar kidnaps Cisco and forces him to modify the Bazooka into an "inter-dimensional quantum splicer" that will allow him to disperse himself throughout time and protect him from the paradox that threatens him. Barry meets with Savitar, believing he can be redeemed, and brings him to S.T.A.R. Labs. Savitar rejects Barry and Iris' pleas, wrecks the lab and orders Caitlin to kill Cisco, but Gypsy saves him. Savitar opens a portal into the Speed Force. Zolomon, as the Black Flash, intervenes, but is disposed of by Caitlin. Savitar then attempts to execute his plan. However, Cisco modified the Bazooka into a 'skeleton key' which frees Jay from the Speed Force prison. Barry, Wally and Jay engage Savitar, while Cisco, with Gypsy's help, convinces Caitlin to abandon Savitar. Barry destroys Savitar's armor after phasing into the armor from behind and phasing Savitar out of the armor. Savitar attempts to kill Barry but is then killed by Iris, saving Barry. Caitlin decides not to use Julian's cure, leaving the team to find her own purpose. Later on, an energy storm appears over Central City, caused by the Speed Force prison being empty. Barry decides to atone for creating Flashpoint by entering the prison, entrusting Central City to the team.

== Cast and characters ==
=== Main ===
- Grant Gustin as Barry Allen / Flash / Savitar
- Candice Patton as Iris West
- Danielle Panabaker as Caitlin Snow / Killer Frost
- Carlos Valdes as Cisco Ramon / Vibe
- Keiynan Lonsdale as Wally West / Kid Flash
- Tom Cavanagh as Harrison Wells (Note: Cavanagh portrays H. R. Wells and Harry Wells primarily and an Earth-17 doppelgänger in a less prominent capacity.)
- Jesse L. Martin as Joe West

=== Recurring ===
- John Wesley Shipp as Jay Garrick / Flash and Henry Allen
- Tom Felton as Julian Albert / Doctor Alchemy
- Tobin Bell voices Savitar and Doctor Alchemy
- Violett Beane as Jesse Chambers Wells / Jesse Quick
- Danielle Nicolet as Cecile Horton
- Andre Tricoteux as Savitar
- Jessica Camacho as Gypsy
- Anne Dudek as Tracy Brand

=== Guest ===
- Matt Letscher as Eobard Thawne / Reverse-Flash
- Alex Désert as Julio Mendez
- Michelle Harrison as Nora Allen
- Todd Lasance as Edward Clariss / Rival
- Emily Bett Rickards as Felicity Smoak
- Peter Flemming as John James
- Joey King as Frances "Frankie" Kane / Magenta
- Wentworth Miller as Leonard Snart / Captain Cold
- Grey Damon as Sam Scudder / Mirror Master
- Ashley Rickards as Rosalind "Rosa" Dillon
- Patrick Sabongui as David Singh
- Susan Walters as Carla Tannhauser
- Thomas Cadrot as Nigel
- Mike McLeod as Shade
- Greg Grunberg as Tom Patterson
- Stephen Amell as Oliver Queen / Green Arrow
- Franz Drameh as Jefferson "Jax" Jackson / Firestorm
- Victor Garber as Martin Stein / Firestorm and an unnamed gangster in the "Duet" reality
- Willa Holland as Thea Queen / Speedy
- Caity Lotz as Sara Lance / White Canary
- Dominic Purcell as Mick Rory / Heat Wave
- David Ramsey as John Diggle / Spartan
- Brandon Routh as Ray Palmer / Atom
- Melissa Benoist as Kara Danvers / Kara Zor-El / Supergirl
- Audrey Marie Anderson as Lyla Michaels
- Christina Brucato as Lily Stein
- Donnelly Rhodes as "Glasses"
- Jeremy Wasserman as "Traveler"
- Mark Hamill as The Trickster
- Nicholas Gonzalez as Dante Ramon
- Stephen Huszar as Jared Morillo / Plunder
- Andrea Brooks as Eve Teschmacher
- Matthew Kevin Anderson as Clive Yorkin
- Riley Jade as Joanie
- Caitlin Stryker as Laura Stone
- Keith David voices Solovar
- David Sobolov voices Grodd
- Vanessa Estelle Williams as Francine West
- Robbie Amell as Ronnie Raymond
- Rick Cosnett as Eddie Thawne
- John Barrowman as Cutter Moran
- David Harewood as J'onn J'onzz / Martian Manhunter
- Jeremy Jordan as Grady
- Chris Wood as Mon-El and Tommy in the "Duet" reality
- Darren Criss as Music Meister
- David Dastmalchian as Abra Kadabra
- Richard Zeman as Lucious Coolidge / Heat Monger

== Production ==
=== Development ===
In March 2016, The CW president Mark Pedowitz announced that The Flash was renewed for a third season, which was initially reported to be given a 22-episode order. However, Brian Ford Sullivan, a writer, clarified that August that there would be 23 episodes. Andrew Kreisberg, Aaron and Todd Helbing served as the season's showrunners, while Zack Stentz, who wrote the season 2 episode "The Runaway Dinosaur", joined as consulting producer. He announced his exit from the series on February 1, 2017, and Aaron Helbing left in May 2017.

=== Writing ===
In June 2016, Grant Gustin confirmed that the season premiere would be titled "Flashpoint" and adapt elements from the comics storyline of the same name which showed Barry Allen traveling back in time to save his mother from being murdered, creating a new timeline in the process, though he later noted that "We're definitely doing this [Flashpoint] thing our own way.... This will be its own thing." Gustin also revealed that the "Flashpoint" timeline of the series would not last for all of the third season, but that there would be "permanent ramifications".

=== Casting ===
Main cast members Grant Gustin, Candice Patton, Danielle Panabaker, Carlos Valdes, Jesse L. Martin, and Keiynan Lonsdale returned from previous seasons as Barry Allen / The Flash, Iris West, Caitlin Snow, Cisco Ramon, Joe West, and Wally West, respectively. Gustin also portrayed Savitar, the season's Big Bad. Tom Cavanagh also returned as a regular, portraying the Harrison Wells of Earth-19 who goes by "H.R". He also portrayed, in a less prominent capacity, "Harry" Wells of Earth-2, and several parallel universe versions of Wells as cameos: a hillbilly from an unspecified Earth, the Wells of Earth-17, and a French-speaking mime artist from another Earth. Tom Felton joined the cast as Julian Albert, a fellow crime-scene investigator at the Central City Police Department. The character was originally known as Julian Dorn, and serves as the series' version of Doctor Alchemy.

Rick Cosnett, who played Eddie Thawne as a regular during season 1, was confirmed to make a guest appearance in the second part of the season, with no additional details given about his return. He was later revealed to be playing the Speed Force's manifestation of Eddie.

=== Design ===
Practical effects and costume for Savitar were created by Legacy Effects. Kreisberg noted, "The suit's body lights were all practical, which I think was actually one of the hardest parts of the process. One light would go out and...Oh God, we'd be screwed!" The Killer Frost costume seen in the third season differs substantially from that seen in season two; while the earlier version was simply leather pants and a jacket, this one includes fishnets, thigh-high boots and a cape. The season introduces Wally West as Kid Flash, and the costume was designed to look exactly as in the comics. The Flash costume of the Barry Allen from 2024 was designed to look more sleek and form fitting than the present Barry's costume, and additionally features a more prominent yellow belt.

=== Filming ===
Production for the season began on July 6, 2016, in Vancouver. The episode "The Once and Future Flash" marked Tom Cavanagh's return to directing after a decade; he previously directed three episodes of the TV series Ed (2000–2004). Production concluded on April 22, 2017.

=== Music ===
All music is composed by Blake Neely.

The Flash: Season 3 (Original Television Soundtrack) track listing
| No. | Title | Length |
|---|---|---|
| 1. | "Rival Attacks Kid Flash" | 1:21 |
| 2. | "Asking Him to Kill" | 2:38 |
| 3. | "Showdown at the Sawmill" | 2:17 |
| 4. | "Problems With Flashpoint" | 2:08 |
| 5. | "Jumpstart Your Powers" | 1:50 |
| 6. | "Training Jessie" | 1:27 |
| 7. | "H.R. Wells" | 2:27 |
| 8. | "Monster" | 2:36 |
| 9. | "Wanted to Be a Scientist" | 2:47 |
| 10. | "Confronting Alchemy / Meeting Savitar" | 3:39 |
| 11. | "Best Team-Up Ever / Things Got Worse" | 1:50 |
| 12. | "Invasion" | 4:04 |
| 13. | "Watching Iris Die" | 1:26 |
| 14. | "I Ran to the Future" | 2:00 |
| 15. | "Barry Tells Iris Her Fate" | 3:02 |
| 16. | "Not Vibing With Gypsy" | 3:16 |
| 17. | "Attack on Gorilla City" | 4:17 |
| 18. | "Not Afraid to Die" | 2:57 |
| 19. | "Grodd Fights Solovar" | 2:21 |
| 20. | "The Wrath of Savitar" | 2:52 |
| 21. | "Jay Sacrifices for Wally" | 2:12 |
| 22. | "Abra Kadabra Is No Help" | 2:48 |
| 23. | "Killer Frost" | 3:44 |
| 24. | "The Real Savitar" | 3:10 |
| 25. | "Infantino Street" | 3:18 |
| 26. | "Traded Places" | 5:15 |
| 27. | "Barry's Sacrifice" | 4:18 |
| Total length: | | 1:17:10 |

=== Arrowverse tie-ins ===
During the third season, The Flash was a part of the "Invasion!" crossover event with Arrow and Legends of Tomorrow. The event also saw Melissa Benoist reprising her role as Kara Danvers / Supergirl from Supergirl. Andrea Brooks, who plays Eve Teschmacher on Supergirl, briefly reprised her role in the episode "Dead or Alive". The Supergirl episode "Star-Crossed" ends with Music Meister (Darren Criss) hypnotizing Kara on Earth-38 and fleeing to Earth-1 to do the same to Barry, thus initiating the events of The Flash season 3 episode "Duet". Benoist returned as Kara, as did Supergirl regulars Chris Wood, David Harewood and Jeremy Jordan, along with Legends of Tomorrow regular Victor Garber and former Arrow regular John Barrowman.

== Marketing ==
In July 2016, members of the cast as well as executive producers Todd Helbing and Aaron Helbing attended San Diego Comic-Con to promote the season, where the first trailer for the season was released. The trailer showed first footage of Lonsdale as Kid Flash, The Rival, and Doctor Alchemy. A teaser promo titled "Time Strikes Back" was released on August 23, 2016, featuring John Wesley Shipp as Jay Garrick talking to Barry. The official poster for the season was released on September 20, 2016, starring Grant Gustin as Barry Allen sporting The Flash's iconic bright red suit with the tagline: "New Destinies. New Dangers."

In September 2016, The CW released the promo "Superhero Fight Club 2.0" to promote the start of the 2016–17 season with the addition of Supergirl to their lineup, as well as their new mobile app, where the promo could exclusively be viewed initially. The new Superhero Fight Club sees Green Arrow, Flash, Atom, Firestorm, White Canary and Supergirl go up against a new fight simulator created by Cisco Ramon and Felicity Smoak, while Diggle and Martian Manhunter observe. After defeating the simulator, Cisco releases Grodd into the arena for the heroes to face.

The analytics firm ListenFirst Media determined The Flash garnered the seventh most user engagement among broadcast shows, with 7.52 million total engagements from May 1 to August 30, 2016. ListenFirst analyzed fan growth, responses and conversation volume across Facebook, Instagram, Tumblr and Google+.

== Release ==
=== Broadcast ===
The season first aired on October 4, 2016, on The CW in the United States, and on CTV in Canada, before moving to CTV2 on February 28, 2017. The season ended on May 23, 2017.

=== Home media ===
In October 2016, it was announced that the season would be available for streaming on Netflix eight days after the season finale, part of the new CW-Netflix deal. The five most recent episodes are available to stream for free on the new mobile CW app, instead of on Hulu like the previous two seasons. The season began streaming on Netflix on May 31, 2017, and was released on Blu-ray and DVD in Region 1 on September 5, 2017.

Home media releases for The Flash season 3
The Flash: The Complete Third Season
| Set details | Special features | |
| 23 episodes; 6-disc DVD set/4-disc Blu-ray set; English (Dolby Digital 5.1 Surround); English SDH, Spanish and French subtitles; Subtitles: English | 2016 Comic-Con Panel; Deleted Scenes; Gag Reel; Featurettes; A Conversation with Andrew Kreisberg and Kevin Smith; A Flash in Time: Time Travel in the Flash Universe; Villain School: The Flash Rogues; Allied: The Invasion Complex (The Flash); Rise of Gorilla City; The Flash: I'm Your Super Friend; The Flash: Hitting the Fast Note; Harmony in a Flash; Synchronicity in a Flash | |
DVD release dates
| Region 1 | Region 2 | Region 4 |
| September 5, 2017 | September 11, 2017 | September 6, 2017 |
Blu-ray release dates
| Region A | | Region B |
| September 5, 2017 | | September 11, 2017 |

== Reception ==
=== Ratings ===
Viewership and ratings per episode of The Flash season 3
| No. | Title | Air date | Rating/share (18–49) | Viewers (millions) | DVR (18–49) | DVR viewers (millions) | Total (18–49) | Total viewers (millions) |
|---|---|---|---|---|---|---|---|---|
| 1 | "Flashpoint" | October 4, 2016 | 1.3/5 | 3.17 | 0.8 | 1.89 | 2.1 | 5.06 |
| 2 | "Paradox" | October 11, 2016 | 1.1/4 | 2.80 | 0.7 | 1.92 | 1.8 | 4.72 |
| 3 | "Magenta" | October 18, 2016 | 1.0/4 | 2.67 | 0.9 | 2.00 | 1.9 | 4.67 |
| 4 | "The New Rogues" | October 25, 2016 | 1.0/3 | 2.80 | 0.9 | 1.91 | 1.9 | 4.71 |
| 5 | "Monster" | November 1, 2016 | 1.0/3 | 2.77 | 0.9 | 2.01 | 1.9 | 4.78 |
| 6 | "Shade" | November 15, 2016 | 1.2/4 | 3.01 | 0.9 | 2.06 | 2.1 | 5.07 |
| 7 | "Killer Frost" | November 22, 2016 | 1.1/4 | 2.95 | 0.8 | 1.99 | 1.9 | 4.93 |
| 8 | "Invasion!" | November 29, 2016 | 1.5/5 | 4.15 | 0.9 | 2.17 | 2.4 | 6.31 |
| 9 | "The Present" | December 6, 2016 | 1.2/4 | 3.14 | 0.8 | 1.80 | 2.0 | 4.94 |
| 10 | "Borrowing Problems From the Future" | January 24, 2017 | 1.0/3 | 2.72 | 0.8 | 1.92 | 1.8 | 4.64 |
| 11 | "Dead or Alive" | January 31, 2017 | 1.1/4 | 3.06 | 0.7 | 1.64 | 1.8 | 4.71 |
| 12 | "Untouchable" | February 7, 2017 | 1.1/4 | 2.91 | 0.7 | 1.68 | 1.8 | 4.59 |
| 13 | "Attack on Gorilla City" | February 21, 2017 | 1.0/4 | 2.78 | 0.9 | 1.96 | 1.9 | 4.75 |
| 14 | "Attack on Central City" | February 28, 2017 | 1.1/4 | 2.87 | 0.8 | 1.81 | 1.9 | 4.68 |
| 15 | "The Wrath of Savitar" | March 7, 2017 | 0.9/3 | 2.52 | 0.7 | 1.71 | 1.6 | 4.23 |
| 16 | "Into the Speed Force" | March 14, 2017 | 0.9/3 | 2.39 | 0.7 | 1.70 | 1.6 | 4.10 |
| 17 | "Duet" | March 21, 2017 | 1.0/4 | 2.71 | 0.8 | 1.88 | 1.8 | 4.59 |
| 18 | "Abra Kadabra" | March 28, 2017 | 0.9/3 | 2.39 | 0.7 | 1.67 | 1.6 | 4.06 |
| 19 | "The Once and Future Flash" | April 25, 2017 | 1.0/4 | 2.67 | 0.9 | 1.90 | 1.9 | 4.57 |
| 20 | "I Know Who You Are" | May 2, 2017 | 1.0/4 | 2.69 | 0.8 | 1.77 | 1.8 | 4.46 |
| 21 | "Cause and Effect" | May 9, 2017 | 1.0/4 | 2.71 | 0.9 | 1.92 | 1.9 | 4.63 |
| 22 | "Infantino Street" | May 16, 2017 | 0.9/4 | 2.48 | 0.9 | 1.94 | 1.8 | 4.42 |
| 23 | "Finish Line" | May 23, 2017 | 1.1/5 | 3.04 | 0.8 | 1.82 | 1.9 | 4.86 |

The season premiere was watched by 3.17 million people and had a 1.3 demo rating, slightly down from the second-season premiere and on par with its second-season finale. The Flash crossover episode, "Invasion!", saw a season three-high viewership of 4.15 million viewers, which was the show's largest since December 9, 2014, and a season three-high 18–49 rating, the highest since February 16, 2016. The third season finished as the 120th ranked show, with an average viewership of 3.50 million. In Canada, the season was the 9th most-watched series in the 18–49 demographic, 8th among adults 18–34, and 14th among adults 25–54 of the 2016–17 television season.

In 2016, according to an analysis from Parrot Analytics, which used ratings data (where available), peer-to-peer sharing, social media chatter, and other factors to estimate viewer demand for various shows, The Flash was the 5th most popular show in the world, with 3.1 million demand expressions per day, behind Game of Thrones, The Walking Dead, Pretty Little Liars, and Westworld. From January to July 2017, The Flash was the 7th most popular show in the world, with 5.47 million demand expressions per day. Parrot Analytics also noted that the popularity of the show did not slow down during the summer 2017 off-season, saying "It's consistently popular, similar to Game of Thrones, and it appears to be growing in popularity."

=== Critical response ===
The review aggregator website Rotten Tomatoes reported an 85% approval rating with an average rating of 7.14/10 based on 272 reviews. The website's consensus reads, "Taking its most compelling and emotionally resonant turn to date, The Flash shifts focus in its third season, turning from the grandiose and bizarre toward the characters who inhabit its core universe -- all while remaining action-packed, funny, and dramatic." Metacritic, which uses a weighted average, assigned a score of 80 out of 100 based on 4 critics, indicating "generally favorable" reviews.

Jesse Schedeen of IGN rated the season 7.8 out of 10, saying, "The Flash met plenty of speed bumps in Season 3, but a strong finish helped the series persevere in the end." Collider's Carla Day lauded the season finale, rating it four stars out of five, but gave the entire season a rating of three stars. J.C. Maçek III of PopMatters rated the season 7 out of 10, saying, "When the show stumbles, the overarching story arc of the season keeps things going and keeps us interested [...] The show remains interesting and fun enough -- without being too lightweight -- to sustain another season and another cliffhanger."

=== Accolades ===
The Flash was ranked 8th on The Salt Lake Tribune's Top TV Shows of 2016 list. Comic Book Resources named "Flashpoint" and "Invasion!" as the 7th and 16th, respectively, best episodes in 2016 among comic book-related television series. SyfyWire named the season premiere, "Flashpoint" one of the best television episodes of 2016.

Awards and nominations for The Flash season 3
| Year | Award | Category | Nominee(s) | Result | Ref. |
|---|---|---|---|---|---|
| 2016 | TVLine's Performer of the Week | Performance in "Flashpoint" | Candice Patton | Nominated | |
| 2017 | People's Choice Awards | Favorite Network TV Sci-Fi/Fantasy | The Flash | Nominated | |
| 2017 | IGN Awards | Best Action Series | The Flash | Nominated | |
| 2017 | IGN People's Choice Awards | Best Action Series | The Flash | Nominated | |
| 2017 | Kids' Choice Awards | Favorite TV Show – Family Show | The Flash | Nominated | |
| 2017 | TVLine's Performer of the Week | Performance in "Duet" | Grant Gustin | Nominated | |
| 2017 | MTV Movie & TV Awards | Best Hero | Grant Gustin | Nominated | |
| 2017 | BMI Film, TV & Visual Media Awards | BMI Network Television Music Award | Blake Neely | Won | |
| 2017 | Saturn Awards | Best Superhero Adaption Television Series | The Flash | Nominated | |
| 2017 | Saturn Awards | Best Actor on Television | Grant Gustin | Nominated | |
| 2017 | Saturn Awards | Best Supporting Actress on Television | Candice Patton | Won | |
| 2017 | Teen Choice Awards | Choice Action TV Show | The Flash | Won | |
| 2017 | Teen Choice Awards | Choice Action TV Actor | Grant Gustin | Won | |
| 2017 | Teen Choice Awards | Choice Action TV Actress | Candice Patton | Nominated | |
| 2017 | Teen Choice Awards | Choice Action TV Actress | Danielle Panabaker | Nominated | |
| 2018 | Leo Awards | Best Visual Effects in a Dramatic Series | Armen V. Kevorkian, Marc Lougee, James Baldanzi, Andranik Taranyan, and Shirak Agresta (for "I Know Who You Are") | Won | |
