= Solovar =

King Solovar
- Solovar as depicted in Crisis on Infinite Earths #1 (April 1985). Art by George Pérez.

Publication information
- Publisher: DC Comics
- First appearance: The Flash #106 (May 1959)
- Created by: John Broome (writer); Carmine Infantino (artist)

In-story information
- Alter ego: Solovar
- Species: Meta-Gorilla
- Team affiliations: Gorilla City; The Flash Family; Black Lantern Corps
- Notable aliases: Lord Solovar; King Solovar; The Forefather
- Abilities: (Currently): Speed Force evolution grants: Superhuman strength, durability, speed, and agility; Telepathy; Hypercognition; Space-time migration; Dimensional travel; Precognition; Retrocognition; (Previously): Genius-level intellect; Enhanced strength, durability, speed, and agility; Thought reading; Diplomatic immunity; (Formerly): Undead physiology

Solovar is a character appearing in American comic books published by DC Comics. Solovar is a sapient gorilla and leader of a race of gorillas who first appeared as supporting characters of Flash.

Solovar appears in The Flash, voiced by Keith David.

== Publication history ==
Solovar first appeared in The Flash #106 (May 1959) and was created by John Broome and Carmine Infantino.

== Fictional character biography ==
For many years, Solovar is the leader of Gorilla City, a hidden city inhabited by intelligent gorillas. Renowned for his wisdom and psychic powers, he is virtually unchallenged, except by the villainous Gorilla Grodd and his servant Monsieur Mallah. Under Solovar's guidance, Gorilla City is a technological utopia.

In the storyline JLApe: Gorilla Warfare!, Solovar decides his people can no longer use their science to hide from the human world. Believing that the world's ecological and political problems cannot be solved by ignoring them, he opens Gorilla City's borders to the world and asks for membership in the United Nations. During his second visit to the United States, Solovar is assassinated by the Simian Scarlet, a group of rebels from Gorilla City.

Following his death, Solovar is briefly succeeded as king by his nephew Ulgo, who declares war on humanity and attacks the United Nations and the Justice League with a weapon that transforms them into gorillas. After the Justice League stops Ulgo, he is succeeded by Nnamdi, Solovar's son.

During the Blackest Night event, Barry Allen races to Gorilla City to seek aid from Solovar, not knowing of his death. Finding the city ravaged, Barry assumes that Grodd has attacked, only to discover that Solovar has been resurrected as a Black Lantern. Barry destroys Solovar by dragging his body through the air at super-speed, reducing him to dust.

In The New 52 reboot, Solovar is the founder and first ruler of Gorilla City, regarded as the Forefather of his species. He, his followers, and his family have existed since the apex of the Maya civilization, which was destroyed in a Speed Force storm. A bolt of Speed Force energy struck Solovar and a few other apes within the vicinity, creating the first few in a new generation of intelligent gorillas who would come to found Gorilla City.

== Powers and abilities ==
Solovar possesses physical and mental abilities akin to those of Gorilla Grodd, stemming from the same meteorite that evolved them and the rest of their kind. Solovar possesses superintelligence, which he uses to rule Gorilla City. He also has the augmented physical abilities of all Super Apes of his homeland.

In Blackest Night, Solovar is reanimated by a Black Power Ring and given the standard abilities of a Black Lantern, such as accelerated regeneration, emotional reading and consumption by removing the hearts of the living, simulation of old powers from his previous life and the typical functions allotted by a Power Ring.

== Other versions ==
- Solovar makes a minor appearance in Flashpoint as the original ruler of Gorilla City before being overthrown by Gorilla Grodd.
- Solovar appears in Scooby-Doo Team-Up.

== In other media ==
=== Television ===
- Solovar appears in the Challenge of the Superfriends episode "Revenge on Gorilla City", voiced by Michael Rye.
- Solovar appears in the Justice League two-part episode "The Brave and the Bold", voiced by David Ogden Stiers. This version is an albino gorilla with white fur and black skin who lacks psionic powers and is Gorilla City's chief of security.
- Solovar appears in the Justice League Unlimited episode "Dead Reckoning", voiced again by David Ogden Stiers.
- An alternate universe version of Solovar appears in The Flash two-part episode "Gorilla City", voiced by Keith David. This version is a gruff yet wise, valiant, and honorable albino gorilla from Earth-2. Additionally, a mental projection of Solovar appears in the episode "Grodd Friended Me".

=== Film ===
Solovar appears in Justice League: Crisis on Infinite Earths, voiced by Darin De Paul.

=== Video games ===
- Solovar appears in Justice League Heroes, voiced by Nick Jameson. This version is an albino gorilla with white fur and gray skin.
- Solovar appears as a character summon in Scribblenauts Unmasked: A DC Comics Adventure.
- Solovar appears as a playable character in Lego DC Super-Villains, voiced by JB Blanc. This version overthrew Gorilla Grodd to become ruler of Gorilla City.

=== Miscellaneous ===
- Solovar appears in Young Justice #18 and #19. This version is the leader of a gorilla troop from Bwunda who were captured by a group of scientists led by the Brain and Ultra-Humanite and experimented on, gaining increased strength, intelligence and telepathy. In the present, Ultra-Humanite uses the gorillas to attack and capture the Team before they liberate them.
- Solovar appears in Injustice 2 as the kind yet ruthless leader of Gorilla City who shares Grodd's enmity towards humanity and seeks out aid from Ra's al Ghul and the League of Assassins to prune mankind's population to a more manageable size. He eventually agrees to peace talks with Atlantis and officiates the marriage of Killer Croc and Orca, but is overthrown and murdered by Grodd and a mind-controlled Deadshot soon afterwards.
