= Crown and Anchor (film) =

2018 Canadian drama film

- Film poster
- Directed by: Andrew Rowe
- Written by: Andrew Rowe; Michael Rowe; Matt Wells
- Produced by: Vince Buda; Rhett Giles; Michael Rowe; Matt Wells
- Starring: Michael Rowe; Matt Wells
- Cinematography: Adam Penney
- Edited by: Andrew Rowe
- Release date: March 2, 2018
- Running time: 78 minutes
- Country: Canada
- Language: English

Crown and Anchor is a Canadian drama film, directed by Andrew Rowe and released in 2018. The film stars Michael Rowe as James, a police officer in Toronto who returns home to Newfoundland and Labrador for his mother's funeral, only to learn that his cousin Danny (Matt Wells) has been drawn into a life of crime and violence.

The film's cast also includes Natalie Brown, Stephen McHattie, Ben Cotton and Robert Joy.

The film premiered at the Cinequest Film Festival in April 2018, and had its Canadian premiere at the Nickel Film Festival in June.

The film received two Canadian Screen Award nominations at the 7th Canadian Screen Awards in 2019, for Best Actor (Rowe) and Best Makeup (Lauryn Ford).
