= Welcome to Earth-2 =

- The Flash episode
- Episode no.: Season 2 Episode 13
- Directed by: Millicent Shelton
- Story by: Greg Berlanti; Andrew Kreisberg
- Teleplay by: Katherine Walczak
- Production code: 3J5663
- Original air date: February 9, 2016

Guest appearances
- Robbie Amell as Ronnie Raymond / Deathstorm; Teddy Sears as Jay Garrick / Flash; Demore Barnes as Henry Hewitt; Violett Beane as Jesse Wells; Michelle Harrison voices Nora Allen; Michael Rowe as Floyd Lawton; Patrick Sabongui as David Singh; Adam Stafford as Adam Fells / Geomancer

Episode chronology
| ← Previous "Fast Lane" | Next → "Escape from Earth-2" |
- The Flash (season 2)

"Welcome to Earth-2" is the thirteenth episode, and first part of a two-part story arc, of the second season of the American television series The Flash, based on the DC Comics character Barry Allen / Flash. It follows a crime scene investigator with super-human speed who fights criminals, including others with superhuman abilities. It is set in the Arrowverse and is a spin-off of Arrow. The episode was written by Katherine Walczak from a story by Greg Berlanti and Andrew Kreisberg, and directed by Millicent Shelton.

Grant Gustin stars as Barry, and is joined by principal cast members Candice Patton, Danielle Panabaker, Carlos Valdes, Keiynan Lonsdale, Tom Cavanagh, and Jesse L. Martin. The episode sees Barry, Cisco Ramon and Harry Wells travel to the parallel universe Earth-2 to rescue Harry's daughter Jesse from Zoom, while back on Earth-1, Jay Garrick takes over Barry's crime fighting duties when the metahuman Geomancer attacks Central City. The episode sees the majority of main cast members also playing their Earth-2 doppelgängers.

"Welcome to Earth-2" originally aired on The CW on February 9, 2016, and according to Nielsen Media Research, was watched by 3.96 million viewers, the show's largest viewership since February 2015. It was the series' highest rating in the 18–34 demographic since its premiere and highest 18–49 rating since the crossover "Flash vs. Arrow". The episode received a highly positive critical response, and many critics called it the best episode of the series to that point. The arc established in this episode concluded with the following episode, "Escape from Earth-2".

== Plot ==
In Earth-1, Barry Allen closes all of the breaches leading to parallel universe Earth-2, except for the one in S.T.A.R. Labs. Using the last breach, he travels to Earth-2 with Cisco Ramon and Harry Wells to rescue Harry's daughter Jesse, who has been kidnapped by speedster Zoom. However, an energy surge destabilizes the breach, leaving the trio stuck on Earth-2. After seeing his doppelgänger, a non-metahuman forensic scientist, on the news, Barry abducts and renders him unconscious to impersonate him and obtain more information on Zoom. He meets this Earth's Iris West, who works as a police detective and is married to his doppelgänger.

Earth-2's versions of Caitlin Snow and Ronnie Raymond, known as Killer Frost and Deathstorm respectively, are working for Zoom and realize that some breachers have entered Earth-2. Barry and Iris meet Joe West's doppelgänger Joseph, a lounge singer. Frost and Deathstorm find and attack Barry at the lounge; Deathstorm fatally wounds Joseph during the attack. Barry fights Frost and Deathstorm outside; the two metahumans escape after Frost is injured.

Meanwhile, a metahuman named Adam Fells / Geomancer appears in Earth-1 Central City. Joe suggests that Jay Garrick use the serum Velocity-6 to fight Fells. Jay refuses and reveals to Caitlin that he invented Velocity-6 and previously took it to become faster but the side effects caused his loss of speed and are gradually killing him. Caitlin develops Velocity-7, which Jay uses to engage Fells until it wears off. Fells almost kills Jay until Joe shoots at him, and escapes.

Back on Earth-2, Iris, her partner Floyd Lawton and Cisco confront Frost and Deathstorm. Cisco, who has made a weapon to combat Frost, attempts to stop the pair, but is confronted by his own doppelgänger, known as Reverb, who is also working for Zoom and can manipulate sonic vibrations to create powerful shock waves. Cisco calls for Barry, who arrives and uses Cisco's weapon to wound Frost, but is stopped by Reverb and Deathstorm. They use their powers repeatedly on him, despite Frost's objections and Zoom wanting Barry unharmed. Zoom arrives, kills Reverb and Deathstorm for harming Barry, captures him and speeds away. Barry later awakens in a glass cell at Zoom's lair, where there are two other prisoners; Jesse and a man trapped in an iron mask.

== Production ==
=== Development and writing ===
The second season of The Flash began to explore the concept of the multiverse, by introducing Earth-2, which features doppelgängers of the inhabitants in Earth-1. In January 2016, it was announced that an upcoming episode in the season would be titled "Welcome to Earth-2", and would focus on Barry Allen travelling to that Earth. The episode, which was the season's thirteenth, was directed by Millicent Shelton and written by Katherine Walczak, Greg Berlanti and Andrew Kreisberg.

Kreisberg described "Welcome to Earth-2" as the first part of a two-part story arc that continues with "Escape from Earth-2". The episode also introduces the Earth-2 doppelgängers of various Earth-1 characters. Kreisberg said some of them "are beyond different. What's so interesting is that you've got [Harry] Wells, who is probably the most similar to himself – the one that we saw last year and this one. They seem different until you start seeing the crazy differences between all of our other cast members. Then he's the one who doesn't seem quite so different and crazy anymore." Examples include the fact that Barry Allen is not a metahuman; Iris West is a police detective married to him; Caitlin Snow, Ronnie Raymond and Cisco Ramon are the metahuman criminals Killer Frost, Deathstorm and Reverb respectively; Joe West is a lounge singer who goes by Joseph and dislikes his son-in-law; Nora Allen is alive; David Singh is a criminal; Henry Hewitt is not a metahuman; and Floyd Lawton is a police officer with poor marksmanship skills.

Candice Patton, who plays Iris, called the Earth-2 version hard, tough, and "less emotionally penetrable" than the Earth-1 version. Season two co-showrunner Todd Helbing called the Earth-2 version of Barry "quite a bit different" from the Earth-1 version, describing him as "very entertaining" and "hilarious", as well as "pretty selfish" from Joseph's perspective. The Earth-2 Barry's speed dial features many contacts whose names are references to the civilian names of DC Comics characters such as "Bruce" (Batman), "Diana" (Wonder Woman) and "Hal" (Green Lantern), in addition to "Eddie" (a reference to Eddie Thawne). Season two co-showrunner Aaron Helbing said these were purely "just Easter eggs for fun", with Todd saying those names were chosen from a "giant board of probably 50 ideas".

=== Casting ===
Main cast members Grant Gustin, Candice Patton, Danielle Panabaker, Carlos Valdes, Keiynan Lonsdale, Tom Cavanagh, and Jesse L. Martin appear in the episode as Barry Allen / Flash, Iris West, Caitlin Snow, Cisco Ramon / Vibe, Wally West, Harry Wells and Joe West, respectively. Gustin, Patton, Panabaker, Valdes and Martin also portray the Earth-2 versions of their characters.

The additional guest cast includes Teddy Sears as Jay Garrick / Flash, Violett Beane as Jesse Wells, and Adam Stafford as Adam Fells / Geomancer. Additionally, Robbie Amell, Demore Barnes, Michelle Harrison, Michael Rowe, and Patrick Sabongui reprise their roles as Earth-2 versions of Deathstorm, Henry Hewitt, Nora Allen, Floyd Lawton, and David Singh, respectively. Tony Todd provides the uncredited voice of Zoom.

=== Arrowverse tie-ins ===
In the episode, as Barry, Cisco and Harry travel to Earth-2, glimpses of the multiverse are seen, including an image of Supergirl star Melissa Benoist as Supergirl and an image of John Wesley Shipp as the Flash from the 1990 television series. Thus, it implied that the two characters and their respective television series exist on alternate Earths to Earth-1.

== Release ==
"Welcome to Earth-2" was first aired in the United States on The CW on February 9, 2016. It was aired alongside the U.S. broadcast in Canada on CTV, while it was first aired in the United Kingdom on Sky 1 on March 29, 2016. It premiered on Fox8 in Australia on February 10, 2016. The episode, along with the rest of The Flash's second season, was released on Blu-ray and DVD on September 6, 2016. Bonus features include behind-the-scenes featurettes, audio commentary, deleted scenes, and a blooper reel. On October 4, 2016, the episode became available for streaming on Netflix in the United States, along with the rest of the second season.

== Reception ==
=== Ratings ===
In the United States, the episode received a 1.6/5 percent share among adults between the ages of 18 and 49, meaning that it was seen by 1.6 percent of all households, and 5 percent of all of those watching television at the time of the broadcast. It was watched by 3.96 million viewers. The episode was the most viewed and highest rated of season two. It had the show's largest audience since February 2015, highest 18–49 rating since the crossover "Flash vs. Arrow" in December 2014, and highest rating in the 18–34 demographic (1.5/6) since its series premiere in October 2014. Within a week of its release the episode was watched by 5.98 million U.S. viewers with a 2.5 rating in the 18–49 demo. The Canadian broadcast gained 1.78 million viewers, the third highest for that night and the ninth highest for the week. The United Kingdom premiere had 1.13 million viewers, and in Australia, the premiere had 147,000 viewers, including 67,000 timeshifted viewers.

=== Critical response ===
The review aggregator website Rotten Tomatoes reported a 93% approval rating for the episode, based on 14 reviews, with an average rating of 9.21/10. The website's critical consensus read at the time, "Invigorated by a jolt of out-of-this-world fun, 'Welcome to Earth-2' successfully ups the pace and action, while providing plenty of delightful Easter egg moments throughout."

Many critics called "Welcome to Earth-2" the best episode in the series to that point. Jesse Schedeen of IGN rated it 9.7 out of 10, praising the concept of Earth-2, Barry's dramatic moments, the depiction of Deathstorm, Killer Frost and Reverb, but criticized the need to kill off Reverb so soon. He concluded, "The Flash delivered one of its best episodes yet as Barry and friends took a hilarious but emotional trip to Earth-2." Angelica Jade Bastién of Vulture praised the direction, action sequences, and the cast's performances, particularly of Gustin and Patton. She called it "undoubtedly the best episode of the season, and just may be the best episode of The Flash yet." Collider's Dave Trumbore rated the episode four stars out of five, saying, "This was an absolutely insane episode of The Flash, and that's saying something since this show is normally fast-paced and full of Easter eggs even on a relatively slow week."

Entertainment Weekly's Jonathon Dornbush praised the scene where Barry talks to his Earth-2 doppelgänger's mother over phone, saying Gustin "has proved mightily adept at tackling Barry's grief, hope, and the many other emotions swirling around in regard to his mother and her death." Scott Von Doviak of The A.V. Club said, the episode "jump-starts both the [Zoom] storyline and the season as a whole" and concluded, "this is just about as good as The Flash gets." Ed Gross of Empire rated the episode four stars out of five, saying, "The Flash may hit an occasional speed bump (sorry) along the way, but it pretty consistently delivers the goods. Welcome To Earth-2 is a perfect example." Charlie Hall of Polygon gave the episode a mixed review and despite complimenting the premise, said, "it eventually devolved into the same storyline we keep seeing over and over again. It's another instance of Allen's impulsiveness getting the better of him."
