= Michael Rowe (actor) =

Canadian actor and musician

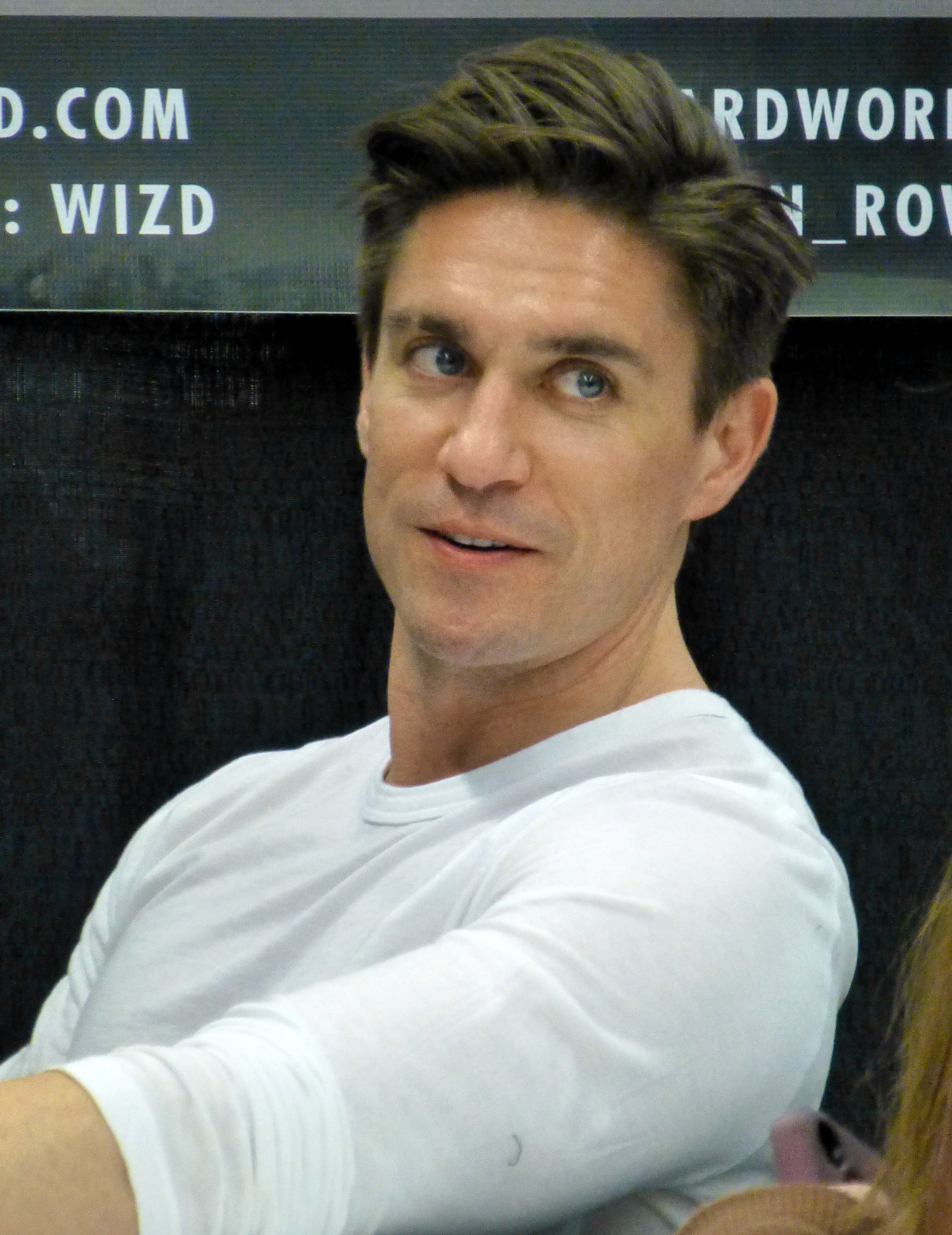
- Rowe in 2015
- Born: St. John's, Newfoundland and Labrador, Canada
- Occupations: Actor, Musician, Producer
- Years active: 1996–present

Michael Rowe is a Canadian actor and musician. He is best known for his portrayal of Floyd Lawton / Deadshot in the television series Arrow.

== Career ==
Michael Rowe came from a family of musicians. After seeing his father perform in a band, he took up drumming at the age of 6. In 1996, he began his career as part of a punk/metal band called Bucket Truck for ten years. After splitting up, Rowe and his brother, Andrew, decided to enter filmmaking. Rowe admitted that he had difficulty getting his name signed due to it sounding similar to Dirty Jobs host Mike Rowe. Despite having only acted for roughly five years, Rowe was immediately cast as the DC Comics character Deadshot in the television series Arrow.

After playing Deadshot for four years, he left the series, though Rowe has expressed interest in returning. He was cast as the Valiant Comics character Ninjak. Rowe stars in Crown and Anchor, a movie he co-wrote with Andrew.

In 2019 he received a Canadian Screen Award nomination for Best Actor for his performance in the film Crown and Anchor.

== Filmography ==
Year	Title	Role	Notes
2009	Soapstone Hippo	Walter	Short
2011	Lies	Jack	Short; Producer
2011	Boltcutter	Jason	Short
2012	Sleepy Stories	David	Short; Producer
2012	The Business of Acting	Mark	Short
2012-2016	Arrow	Floyd Lawton / Deadshot	9 episodes
2014	Godzilla	Air Force #1	Uncredited
2015	Tomorrowland	Deputy	
2015	Vehicular Romanticide	Her Man	Short
2016	The Flash	Floyd Lawton	Episode: "Welcome to Earth-2"
2017	Suck It Up	Dale	
2018	Ninjak vs. the Valiant Universe	Colin King / Ninjak	Main; web series
2018	Crown and Anchor	James Downey	Producer; Writer
2021	Hudson & Rex	Dale	Episode: "The Secret Life of Levi"
