= Dermott Downs =

American film director

- Born: May 25, 1962 (age 64); Los Angeles, California, U.S.
- Occupations: Television director, actor, producer, cinematographer
- Years active: 1972–present

Dermott Daniel Downs (born May 25, 1962) is an American television director, actor, producer and cinematographer.

He is known for his work on the U.S. remake of The Tomorrow People, and for his vast contributions to The CW's Arrowverse.

== Career ==
Downs first started his career as a child actor; appearing in such films as The Morning After, Escape to Witch Mountain, Shadow of Fear, and Freaky Friday.

In his adulthood, he segued into cinematography; working on films Secret Lies and Takedown, and television series CSI: Miami, CSI: New York and Justice, among others.

He later began a career in directing. First helming an episode of a series he was doing photography work on; Justice. Since then he has directed installments of Close to Home, K-Ville, Dark Blue, Nikita, Common Law, Gotham, Criminal Minds, and Supergirl.

=== Chase ===
In 2010, Downs became a producer and director on the NBC series Chase. Ultimately, he helmed 6 episodes of the 18-episode first season.

=== The Tomorrow People ===
In summer 2013, he joined The CW series The Tomorrow People, as a director of photography and director. During the course of the series' one-season run he directed 4 instalments ("Sitting Ducks", "Superhero", "Smoke and Mirrors", "Kill Switch").

=== Arrowverse ===
==== The Flash ====
After having had worked for Greg Berlanti on Tomorrow People, Berlanti brought Downs on to his new DC Comics superhero series The Flash. Downs directed the freshman season's fifth episode, "Plastique", featuring the introduction of the titular villainess. He returned to helm "Grodd Lives", the season one finale "Fast Enough", the second season's seventh instalment, "Gorilla Warfare", the third season's eighth, thirteenth, fourteenth and seventeenth installments, "Invasion!", "Attack on Gorilla City", "Attack on Central City", "Duet", and the forth season’s eighth instalment, "Crisis on Earth-X, Part 3".

==== Arrow ====
Downs also worked on Flash sister-series Arrow, directing the season three episodes "The Return" and "The Offer"; as well as the season five episode "Penance".

==== Legends of Tomorrow ====
In early 2015, Downs directed a 3-minute network presentation for future Flash/Arrow spin-off DC's Legends of Tomorrow. It was shot over the course of one night. The footage ultimately clinched the series order for the show in May 2015. Downs was later confirmed to return as a director for the first season. His first episode was the third, "Blood Ties". He went on to direct the fifth episode, "Fail-Safe"; and the first-season finale, "Legendary". He directed the season two premiere, "Out of Time", and the ninth instalment, "Raiders of the Lost Art". He directed season three’s tenth instalment "Daddy Darhkest" and the third season finale "The Good, the Bad and the Cuddly".

==== Supergirl ====
Down also directed several episodes of The CW show Supergirl including season 1 episodes "Fight or Flight", "For the Girl Who Has Everything", "Solitude" and season 3 episodes "Far From the Tree" and "Not Kansas".

==== Batwoman ====
Downs directed two episodes of The CW show Batwoman including the season 1 episodes "Down, Down, Down" and "Drink Me".

=== Blindspot ===
Downs directed three episodes of the NBC show Blindspot for the season one episode #19: "In the Comet of Us"; the season two episode #43: "In Words, Drown I"; and the season five episode #95: "Fire & Brimstone."

=== Doom Patrol ===
Downs directed three episodes of the DC Universe show Doom Patrol including the season 1 episodes "Donkey Patrol", "Danny Patrol","Ezekiel Patrol" and the season 3 episode "Possibilities Patrol".

=== Prodigal Son ===
Downs directed two episodes of the Fox show Prodigal Son which were the episodes "Scheherazade" and "The Killabustas"

=== Chucky ===
Downs directed two episodes of the USA Network and SyFy show Chucky: "Give Me Something Good to Eat" and "I Like To Be Hugged".

=== Fire Country ===
Downs directed two episodes of the CBS show Fire Country which were the episodes "The Fresh Prince of Edgewater" and "Two Pink Lines"

=== Star Trek: Strange New Worlds ===
Downs directed a musical episode of the Paramount+ show Star Trek: Strange New Worlds, "Subspace Rhapsody".
