= BP Cooper =

- Born: Brian Paul Cooper; Denver, Colorado, U.S.
- Occupations: Screenwriter, Producer
- Years active: 2004–present

BP Cooper is an American screenwriter, film and commercial producer. He is best known for co-writing and producing the indie film Time Lapse, directed by Bradley D. King and starring Danielle Panabaker.

In commercials he produced the AT&T "It's Not Complicated" campaign directed by Jorma Taccone and starring SNL actor Beck Bennet where he interviews kids. Cooper also produced the K-Swiss campaign starring Danny McBride's fictional character of Kenny Powers as the disruptive CEO of the company.

== Awards ==
=== Best screenplay ===
- Best Screenplay at the Maverick Movie Awards (2014, won)
- Best Screenplay at the Orlando Film Festival (2014, won)
- Best Screenplay at the Other Worlds Austin (2014, won)

=== International ===
- Best International Screenplay at the Rojo Sangre Film Festival (2014, won)
