= Daedalus Howell =

American journalist

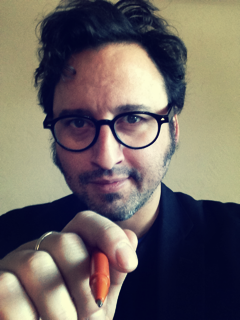
- Writer Daedalus Howell.
- Born: July 19, 1972 (age 54); Sonoma County, California, U.S.
- Occupations: Writer; filmmaker; conceptual artist; actor; journalist

Daedalus Howell (born July 19, 1972) is an American writer, journalist, filmmaker, actor, conceptual artist, and radio host who lives and works in Petaluma, California.

He wrote the novels Quantum Deadline and The Late Projectionist and the essay collection I Heart Sonoma: How to Live and Drink in Wine Country. He is the writer-director of the feature films Pill Head and Werewolf Serenade. He hosted the podcast Daedalus Howell: Night School of the Mind and The Morning Show on KSVY 91.3 FM, Sonoma. Since 2019, he's served as the editor of the North Bay Bohemian and the Pacific Sun newspapers. In August 2025, Howell became the host of The Drive with Daedalus Howell, an afternoon talk show on Wine Country Radio's 95.5 FM broadcasting from Santa Rosa, CA.

== Early life ==
Howell was born in Sonoma County, California. He left Petaluma High School in 1988 via the California High School Proficiency Exam following a suspension from performing a staged adaptation of Dr. Strangelove (he would have graduated as part of the class of 1990). He later studied creative writing at San Francisco State University.

== Career ==
With poets Trane DeVore and Jonathan Legare, Howell published the literary quarterly Deluge Six. Howell would later create Scam Magazine, a satire tabloid published intermittently between 1993 and 1995. The publishing interest also released author Geoffrey B. Cain's novel "The Wards of St. Dymphna." Howell later liquidated the publishing company's assets (including a variety of related Internet domain names) to subsidize his first forays into independent film.

As a journalist, he has written for the San Francisco Chronicle, the North Bay Bohemian, the Petaluma Argus-Courier, Los Angeles Downtown News, FineLife Sonoma Magazine (for which he was editor), Sonoma Valley Sun, the Rivertown Report. As a broadcast personality, Howell has hosted shows on KWMR (West Marin Coastal Radio) and KSVY (Sonoma, CA) and guest hosts The Drive on KSRO in Sonoma County. He wrote a weekly column for the Sonoma Index-Tribune. He has also penned a media column for the North Bay Bohemian and was credited as the "wine country editor" of Tasting Panel Magazine.

In 2005, Howell and collaborator Jerry Rapp became known for squatting on the Warner Bros. studio back lot. The experience became the inspiration for their proposed TV series "Back Lot." Negotiations with Fremantle Media and the Sundance Channel stalled in 2005 and the project was eventually shelved, though several short stories by Howell and a short film produced by Howell, Rapp and then-producer Ross Martin still exist. The series was pitched as "Two guys sneak off a tourist tram onto a Hollywood back lot, live in the sets, eat craft service and wear wardrobe while trying to get a three picture deal." It is highly unlikely that Howell and Rapp could have evaded lot security for any meaningful duration and their hijinks were thought to be a hoax. Howell's account of the "Back Lot" odyssey was published by Metroactive as "L.A. Confidential " in the August 24–30, 2005 issue of the North Bay Bohemian. The article was subtitled "In which our writer mines Milton, fends off Fabio, suffers attachment issues and waits to get back on the lot."

With Rapp, Howell wrote and directed the R&H Educational Film Series, a four-part parody of American "social guidance films" of the 1950s. The series has played on Showtime and Canal+. A portion of the series was showcased on IFC. Howell has also directed music videos for RCA-signed Longwave and New York City-based Falcon. Howell also co-produced the feature film The Aviary and ran publicity for Deep Dark Canyon for filmmakers Silver Tree and Abe Levy.

In 2009, Howell formed DHowell Media Group, a branded entertainment company which has produced content for national brands including Annie's Homegrown, Morton's Steakhouse and Sutter Home Winery as well as numerous music videos. In October 2010, Howell changed the name of the company to FMRL, an acronym for "Future Media Research Lab" and a pun on "ephemeral." In 2011, FMRL contracted with Wikia to produce food and beverage-themed content in addition to renewing its relationship with the Sonoma County Tourism Bureau to produce Howell's "lifestyle ambassador" video series. It later became a publishing collective.

Howell starred in "Replica Redux," the re-released version of cult film "Replica," which was directed by Raymond Scott Daigle and released on YouTube in 2012. A night-in-the-life of several copy store employees, he plays a beleaguered nightshift manager whose life collapses in the course of several hours. The entire film was shot after hours in a FedEx Kinkos without corporate knowledge.

In 2015, Howell published the novel Quantum Deadline, part one of the Lumaville Labyrinth series. He also wrote the novel The Late Projectionist and is the writer-director of dozens of short films.

== Awards ==
In 2007, Howell placed first in the Association of Alternative Newsweeklies’ national “Altweekly Awards” for Food Writing/Criticism (circ. 60,000 or less) for his wine column in the North Bay Bohemian.

The California Tourism Industry Association (CalTIA) awarded Howell first place for his Inside Sonoma series in October 2008.

In 2011, Howell also won first place in the National Newspaper Association Better Newspaper Contest for "Best Humorous Column" for his contributions to the Sonoma Index-Tribune.

In 2012, Howell and collaborator Raymond Scott Daigle won a Gold Adrian Award from Hospitality Sales and Marketing Association International (HSMAI) for achievements in marketing and public relations on behalf of their client the Sonoma County Tourism Bureau.

In 2017, host Daedalus Howell and producer Takeshi Lewis' The Morning Show, KSVY 91.3 FM, was voted "Best Local Radio Show" in the Sonoma Valley Sun 2017 Readers Poll.

In 2023, as editor of the Pacific Sun (newspaper), Daedalus Howell won 2nd place in the "writing" category of the California News Publisher Association Awards for work published in 2022.

== Personal life ==
Howell's recorded birth name was "Daedalus Christopher Ferguson," though he changed his surname to "Howell" at 18, which was his father's original last name prior to adoption by his stepfather. Throughout his formative years, Howell used the name "Chris Ferguson" and did not begin using "Daedalus Howell" in earnest until his early 20s when he became a professional writer. He pronounces his first name as "DAY-de-lus."

Howell is sometimes connected to Albert Summers Howell, co-founder of Bell & Howell Co. (maker of motion picture cameras in the pioneering days of cinema), though he refuses to comment on his familial association despite being linked in various genealogies.

Howell frequently wears a sartorial "uniform" of a dark blazer, jeans and Beatle boots, which he referred to as his "action figure outfit" in Shea Magazine.

== Bibliography ==
- Howell, Daedalus. (1999). The Late Projectionist. SoCo Arts & Media. ISBN 0-9671001-0-0.
- Howell, Daedalus. (2012). I Heart Sonoma: How to Live & Drink in Wine Country. FMRL. ISBN 978-0-9671001-2-8
- Howell, Daedalus. (2015). Quantum Deadline. FMRL. ISBN 978-0-967-1001-7-3

== Filmography ==
- Werewolf Serenade, writer-director-actor
- Pill Head, writer-director
- Fletcher Benton: The Artist's Studio
- "Everywhere You Turn" video for New York-based Longwave.
- Hold Me With Your Robot Hand
- Is It Time to Swap?
- Johnny Come Early
- Farewell, My Android
- Orange
- All's Well That's Orwell
- I Am a Croissant
- The Hands of San Francisco
- The Aviary, co-producer
- Life of Making (official selection of the Sonoma International Film Festival)

Howell also hosted and directed the documentary "Copia: The American Center for Food, Wine and the Arts," for WineTV, which never aired due to the closure of Copia.

== Citations ==
- "Duck and Cover," The Escapist
- Rosie and Mrs. America: Perceptions of Women in the 1930s and 1940s
- Fire, Blood and Alphabet: One Hundred Years of Lorca
