= Danielle Panabaker =

American actress (born 1987)

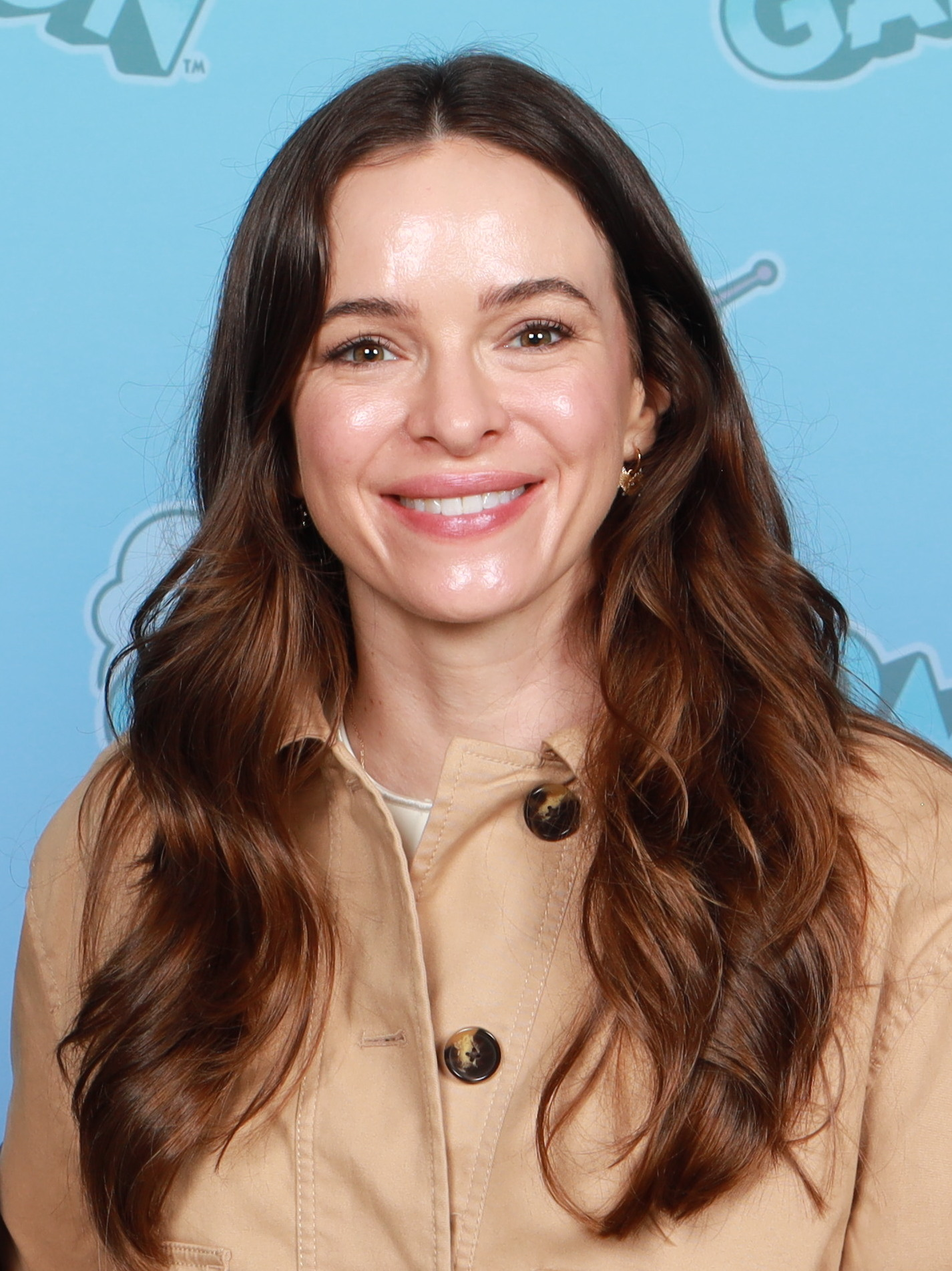
- Panabaker in 2026
- Born: Danielle Nicole Panabaker; September 19, 1987 (age 39); Augusta, Georgia, U.S.
- Education: Glendale Community College (AA); University of California, Los Angeles (BA)
- Occupation: Actress
- Years active: 2002–present
- Spouse: Hayes Robbins (m. 2017)
- Children: 2
- Relatives: Kay Panabaker (sister)

Danielle Nicole Panabaker (born September 19, 1987) is an American actress. She began acting as a teenager and came to prominence for her roles in the Disney films Stuck in the Suburbs (2004), Sky High (2005) and Read It and Weep (2006), and in the HBO miniseries Empire Falls (2005). She won three Young Artist Awards: for guest-starring in an episode of the legal drama television series The Guardian (2004), for her lead role in the TV film Searching for David's Heart (2005) and for her ensemble performance in the family comedy film Yours, Mine & Ours (2005).

Panabaker came to wider attention as a cast member in the CBS legal drama series Shark (2006–2008) and is also noted as a scream queen, having starred in the psychological thriller Mr. Brooks (2007) and the horror films Friday the 13th (2009), The Crazies (2010), John Carpenter's The Ward (2010) and Piranha 3DD (2012).

After starring in recurring roles on Necessary Roughness (2011–2013), Bones (2012–2013) and Justified (2014), Panabaker guest-starred as Caitlin Snow on The CW television series Arrow in April 2014. The actress was then included as Snow in the main cast of the spin-off series The Flash, which premiered that October. Starting with the series' second season, Panabaker began playing the character's alter ego Killer Frost in different capacities, in conjunction with her role as Snow, leading to subsequent guest appearances on Arrow, Supergirl and Legends of Tomorrow. For her role on The Flash as Frost, Panabaker has been nominated for five Teen Choice Awards and won the 2019 Saturn Award for Best Supporting Actress on Television.

== Early life ==
Panabaker was born in Augusta, Georgia, to Donna (née Mayock) and Harold Panabaker. Her younger sister, Kay Panabaker, was also an actress and is currently working as a zoologist. As her father's sales job took them across the country, the family spent time in South Carolina, Pennsylvania, and, for a short time around Panabaker's kindergarten year, in Orange, Texas. She took a theater class at a summer camp, discovered her love of acting, and started acting in community theaters at the age of 12, later auditioning for commercials.

After moving to Naperville, Illinois, in 2000, Panabaker went to Crone Middle School and then Neuqua Valley High School, participating in the speech team. She graduated from high school when she was 14 years old. Panabaker also took ballet and pointe classes up until she was fifteen. In 2003, feeling it was the only way to land acting roles regularly, Panabaker, her sister, and their mother relocated to Los Angeles, California, so she could pursue an acting career. She attended Glendale Community College, studying acting. In 2005, she earned her associate degree and appeared on the national Dean's List. In 2006, she began her senior year at the University of California, Los Angeles, from which she graduated with a Bachelor of Arts in June 2007, again appearing on the Dean's List.

== Career ==
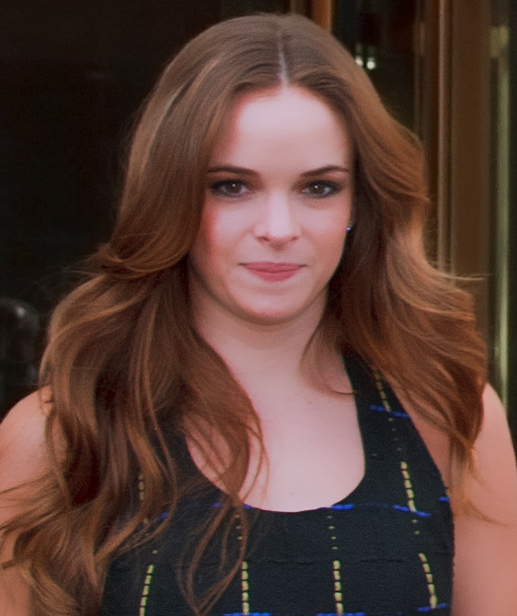
Panabaker at the 2010 Toronto International Film Festival

Panabaker followed her initial appearances in commercials with roles in television, including a part in The Guardian (for which she won a Young Artist Award), as well as other television series including Malcolm in the Middle, Law & Order: Special Victims Unit, Medium, and Summerland, and the Disney Channel Original Movie Stuck in the Suburbs. She also appeared in the Lifetime Television productions Sex and the Single Mom and Mom at Sixteen, as well as the well-reviewed miniseries Empire Falls. She considers Empire Falls to be her big break, as it gave her the confidence to pursue her career. In addition, Panabaker appeared in stage productions with roles in musical theater, including West Side Story, Pippin, Once upon a Time, and Beauty Lou and the Country Beast. In 2004, she starred in the ABC film "Searching for David's Heart". In 2005, Panabaker co-starred in two widely released theatrical films, Sky High and Yours, Mine & Ours. Her next role was in the film Home of the Giants (2008). She also had a supporting role in the film Mr. Brooks. In the Disney Channel original movie Read It and Weep, she plays Is, an alternate version of Jamie, who was played by her real-life sister, Kay Panabaker.

From 2006 to 2008, Panabaker starred in the CBS television drama Shark, playing Julie Stark, the daughter of the lead character. In 2009, Panabaker played Jenna, a main character in the Friday the 13th reboot. Panabaker next starred in the films The Crazies and The Ward.

In 2011, Panabaker starred as Katie Lapp, the lead character in the Hallmark Channel movie The Shunning, based on the novel by Beverly Lewis. She was to reprise her role in the 2013 sequel The Confession, but a scheduling conflict forced her to drop out, and the role was recast. In 2013, she starred in another Hallmark Channel movie, Nearlyweds. On May 5, 2013, Panabaker joined actors including Philip Baker Hall, Bill Pullman, and Maggie Siff in performing at Cedering Fox's WordTheatre, where they read aloud contemporary short fiction. In 2014, Panabaker starred in Bradley D. King's award-winning science-fiction film Time Lapse, for which she won the award for Best Actor/Actress at the 2014 London Independent Film Festival.

In April 2014, Panabaker guest-starred as Caitlin Snow in a second-season episode of the CW series Arrow; she was later included, playing Snow, in the main cast of the spin-off series The Flash. Panabaker made her directorial debut with the eighteenth episode of the series' fifth season, entitled "Godspeed".

== Charity work ==
Panabaker volunteers for multiple organizations including the Art of Elysium, UNICEF, and Young Storytellers Foundation. In May and June 2019, Panabaker, DC Comics co-publisher Jim Lee, writer Tom King, and fellow CW series actresses Nafessa Williams and Candice Patton toured five U.S. military bases in Kuwait with the United Service Organizations (USO), where they visited the approximately 12,000 U.S. military personnel stationed in that country as part of DC's 80th anniversary of Batman celebration.

== Personal life ==
In July 2016, Panabaker announced that she was engaged to her longtime boyfriend, entertainment attorney Hayes Robbins, and they married on June 24, 2017. They have two children, born in 2020 and 2022.

== Filmography ==
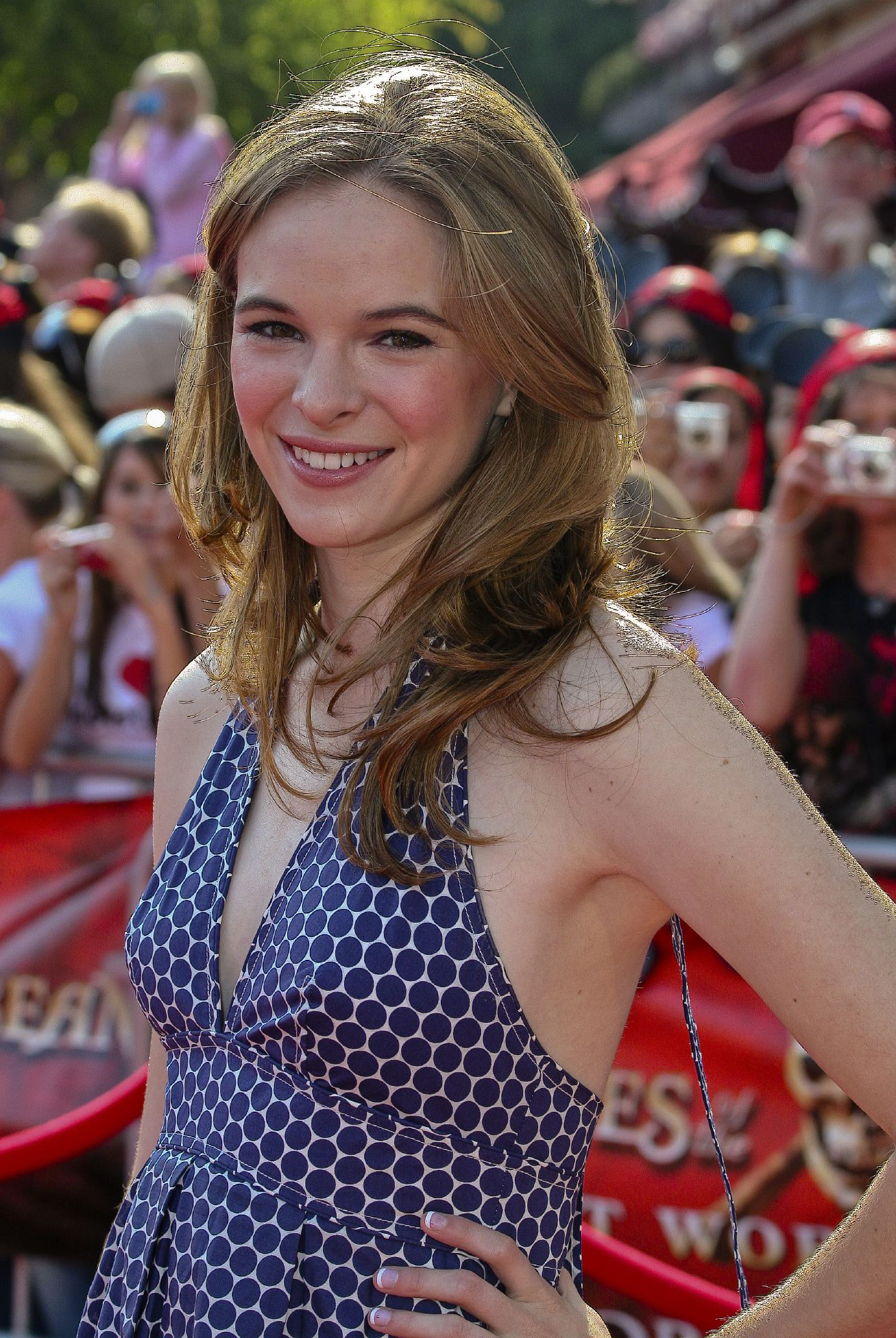
Panabaker at the 2007 Pirates of the Caribbean: At World's End premiere at Disneyland, Anaheim, California

=== Film ===
Year	Title	Role	Notes
2005	Sky High	Layla Williams	
2005	Yours, Mine & Ours	Phoebe North	
2007	Mr. Brooks	Jane Brooks	
2007	Home of the Giants	Bridgette "Bridge" Bachman	
2009	Friday the 13th	Jenna Montgomery	
2010	The Crazies	Becca Darling	
2010	The Ward	Sarah Fray	
2010	Weakness	Danielle	Direct-to-video
2012	Girls Against Boys	Shae Marshall	
2012	Piranha 3DD	Maddy West	
2013	Crystal Lake Memories: The Complete History of Friday the 13th	Herself	Documentary
2014	Lennon or McCartney	Herself	Short documentary
2014	Time Lapse	Callie Snow	Direct-to-video
2015	This Isn't Funny	Stacey	

=== Television ===
Year	Title	Role	Notes
2002	Family Affair	Parker LeeAnn Aldays	Episode: "Ballroom Blitz"
2003	The Bernie Mac Show	Chelsea	Episode: "Raging Election"
2003	Malcolm in the Middle	Kathy McCulskey	Episode: "Reese's Party"
2003	CSI: Crime Scene Investigation	Girl	Episode: "Play with Fire"
2003	Sex and the Single Mom	Sara Gradwell	Television film
2003	The Guardian	Samantha Gray	Episode: "The Father-Daughter Dance"
2004	The Division	Melissa Ringston	Episode: "As I Was Going to St. Ives..."
2004	Stuck in the Suburbs	Brittany Aarons	Television film
2004	Searching for David's Heart	Darcy Deeton	Television film
2005	Mom at Sixteen	Jacey Jeffries	Television film
2005	Law & Order: Special Victims Unit	Carrie Lynn Eldridge	Episode: "Intoxicated"
2005	Empire Falls	Christina "Tick" Roby	Television miniseries
2005	Summerland	Faith	Episodes: "Safe House", "Careful What You Wish For"
2006	Read It and Weep	Isabella	Television film
2006–2008	Shark	Julie Stark	Main role
2008	Eli Stone	Genny Clarke	Episode: "Owner of a Lonely Heart"
2009	Grey's Anatomy	Kelsey Simmons	Episode: "Holidaze"
2010	Medium	Summer Lowry	Episode: "Psych"
2010	Family Guy	Hillary (voice)	Episode: "Brian Griffin's House of Payne"
2010	Law & Order: LA	Chelsea Sennett	Episode: "Hollywood"
2010	Chase	Carina Matthews	Episode: "Crazy Love"
2011	The Shunning	Katie Lapp	Television film
2011	Memphis Beat	Sister Katherine	Episode: "Flesh and Blood"
2011–2013	Necessary Roughness	Juliette Pittman	Recurring role (seasons 1–2)
2012	Intercept	Kat	Television film
2012	Grimm	Ariel Eberhart	Episode: "Plumed Serpent"
2012; 2014	Franklin & Bash	Bonnie Appel	Episodes: "Voir Dire", "Spirits in the Material World"
2012–2013	Bones	Olivia Sparling	Episodes: "The Gunk in the Garage", "The Shot in the Dark"
2013	Nearlyweds	Erin	Television film
2013	Mad Men	Daisy McCluskey	Episode: "For Immediate Release"
2013	The Glades	Holly Harper	Episode: "Happy Trails"
2014	Justified	Penny Cole	Recurring role (season 5)
2014	Recipe for Love	Lauren Hennessey	Television film
2014–2015; 2017–2018	Arrow	Caitlin Snow / Killer Frost	Recurring role (seasons 2–4, 6–7); 5 episodes
2014–2023	The Flash	Caitlin Snow / Killer Frost / Frost / Khione	Main role; also director (5 episodes, season 5–9)
2016–2017; 2020	Legends of Tomorrow	Caitlin Snow / Killer Frost	Episodes: "Invasion!", "Crisis on Earth-X, Part 4" & "Crisis on Infinite Earths, Part 5"
2017–2018	Supergirl	Caitlin Snow / Killer Frost	3
2018	Christmas Joy	Joy Holbrook	Television film
2025	Second Guessing Fate	Gemma	Television film
2026	Crowning at the Prom	Abigail	Television film

=== Music videos ===
- "Misfit" (2003) by Amy Studt, as school girl

=== Web ===
Year	Title	Role	Notes
2015	Fight of the Living Dead	Doctor	Episode 4
2017	Freedom Fighters: The Ray	Caitlin Snow	Episode 5

== Awards and nominations ==
Award	Year	Category	Nominated work	Result	Ref.
London Independent Film Festival	2014	Best Actor/Actress	Time Lapse	Won	
Saturn Awards	2021	Best Supporting Actress on Television	The Flash	Won	
Saturn Awards	2022	Best Supporting Actress in a Network or Cable Television Series	The Flash	Nominated	
Teen Choice Awards	2015	Choice TV Actress – Fantasy/Sci-Fi	The Flash	Nominated	
Teen Choice Awards	2016	Choice TV Actress – Fantasy/Sci-Fi	The Flash	Nominated	
Teen Choice Awards	2017	Choice Action TV Actress	The Flash	Nominated	
Teen Choice Awards	2018	Choice Action TV Actress	The Flash	Nominated	
Teen Choice Awards	2019	Choice Action TV Actress	The Flash	Nominated	
Young Artist Awards	2004	Best Performance in a TV Series – Guest Starring Young Actress	The Guardian	Won	
Young Artist Awards	2005	Best Performance in a TV Movie, Miniseries or Special – Leading Young Actress	Searching for David's Heart	Won	
Young Artist Awards	2006	Best Performance in a Feature Film – Young Ensemble Cast	Yours, Mine & Ours	Nominated	
