= Josh Randall =

American actor (born 1972)

- Born: Joshua Reeve Randall; January 27, 1972 (age 54); Pacific Grove, California, U.S.
- Occupation: Actor
- Spouse: Claire Rankin (m. 2000; div. 2013)

Joshua Reeve Randall (born January 27, 1972) is an American actor. He is best known for his television roles as Dr. Mike Burton on the NBC comedy-drama series Ed (2000–2004) and Sean Beckett on the ABC drama series Station 19 (2021–2024).

== Early life and education ==
Randall was born in Pacific Grove, California, to Randy (teacher) and Sharon (writer). He has a brother (Nathan) and sister (Joanna).

Randall graduated from Monterey High School in Monterey, California. During his senior year, Randall was co-Editor-in-Chief of the school newspaper, The Galleon. He also played basketball.

His father Randy taught Chemistry and Physics at Monterey High. When Randy died in 1997 of colon cancer, the gym at Monterey High was named after him in memory shortly afterwards.

His mother, Sharon, is a syndicated columnist. Randall wrote the foreword to her book "Birdbaths and Paper Cranes."

Randall attended Monterey Peninsula College and San Francisco State University. He earned a BA in English with a minor in Film Study from SF State.

== Personal life ==
Randall was married to actress Claire Rankin from 2000 to 2013.

== Filmography ==
=== Film ===
Year	Title	Role	Notes
1996	Somebody Is Waiting	Robber #1	
1997	The Last Time I Committed Suicide	Guard #2	
1998	The Party Crashers	The Bruise	
2000	It's Alright Ma, I'm Only Trying	Theo	
2002	The Story of O: Untold Pleasures	Natalie's Boyfriend	
2005	The Aviary	Captain Julian	
2005	Lucky 13	Franz	
2007	Timber Falls	Mike	
2007	One of Our Own	Stellan	
2008	Sex Drive	Cashier Boy	
2009	A Good Funeral	Andrew	
2010	The Warrior's Way	Hell Rider	
2011	Knockdown	Jack Sr.	
2011	Stalemate	Arthur	
2011	Juko’s Time Machine	Hammel	
2015	Boned	Dr. Edward Pierce	
2017	Negative	Graham	
2017	Athena Andreadis: You Bring Me Luck	Lost dog finder	
2020	Fantasy Island	Valet Chester	

=== Television ===
Year	Title	Role	Notes
2000	Beyond Belief: Fact or Fiction	Steve Hatchagin	1 episode
2000	Angel	Bartender	1 episode
2000–2004	Ed	Dr. Mike Burton	Main role
2003	Secret Santa	Ryan	Television film
2004	CSI: Miami	Edward Mathis	1 episode
2004	Cold Case	Elliot Garvey (1953)	1 episode
2004	Kevin Hill	Andrew LaFleur	1 episode
2004	Joey	Roger	1 episode
2005	Snow Wonder	Billy	Television film
2005	Lost	Nathan	1 episode
2005	Romancing the Bride	Brian	Television film
2005–2006	Scrubs	Jake	4 episodes
2006	Courting Alex	Scott Larson	Main role
2007	Private Practice	Carl	1 episode
2007	Men in Trees	Danny O'Donnell	2 episodes
2007	Women's Murder Club	Garret Roberts	1 episode
2008	Pushing Daisies	Charles Charles	2 episodes
2009	Three Rivers	Steve O'Leary	1 episode
2009	Raising the Bar	Tim Porter	4 episodes
2009	Life	Evan Tucker	1 episode
2010	The New Adventures of Old Christine	Officer Johnson	1 episode
2010	The Event	Paul Stern	2 episodes
2011	CSI: NY	Charles Martin	1 episode
2011	The Mentalist	Ronald Crosswhite	1 episode
2011	Grey's Anatomy	William	1 episode
2011	Leverage	Fred Bartley	1 episode
2011	Greek	Simon Siegel	6 episodes
2011	The Glades	Kyle Bertram	1 episode
2012	Criminal Minds	Matthew Downs	2 episodes
2012	Franklin & Bash	JAG Steven Puckett	1 episode
2012	Law & Order: Special Victims Unit	Justin Geld	1 episode
2012	Grimm	Timothy Steinkellner	1 episode
2012	Castle	Miles Haxton	1 episode
2012	CSI: Crime Scene Investigation	NTSB Investigator Doug Wilson	1 episode
2013	Major Crimes	Detective Sean Mackeroy	2 episodes
2013	Drop Dead Diva	Stuart Kane	1 episode
2013	The Almighty Johnsons	Bouncer	1 episode
2014	Masters of Sex	Nate Bombeck	1 episode
2014	NCIS	Navy Commander Ryan Barnes	1 episode
2014	Legends	Julian Drake	1 episode
2014	Scandal	James Elliot	1 episode
2016	Quarry	Detective Tommy Olsen	Recurring role, 7 episodes
2016	Pitch	Dave Grissom	1 episode
2016	Scorpion	Pandova	1 episode
2016	Hit the Floor	Eddie	3 episodes
2016	The Shannara Chronicles	Reaper	1 episode
2017	Ozark	Bruce Liddell	2 episodes
2017	There's... Johnny!	Officer	1 episode
2017	Ten Days in the Valley	Tom Petrovich	Main role
2018	Timeless	Lucas' Father	1 episode
2018	Suits	Dr. Chaz McManus	1 episode
2018	Blue Bloods	Tommy Pierce	1 episode
2018	Dirty John	Officer Mitrovich	1 episode
2018	Conrad & Michelle: If Words Could Kill	Joseph Cataldo	Television film
2018	The Mission	Charlie Scooderro	Television film
2019	FBI	Nick Frost	1 episode
2019	The Hypnotist's Love Story	Ian Roman	1 episode
2020	In Another Room	Charlie	1 episode
2021	Cowboy Bebop	Pierrot le Fou	1 episode
2021–2024	Station 19	Sean Beckett	Recurring role (season 5); Series regular (seasons 6-7) 41 episodes
2022	The Fairly OddParents: Fairly Odder	Sergeant Splitz	Episode: "Cake, Dance, & Solid Gold Pants"
2022	Westworld	Jim Navarro	Episode: "Well Enough Alone"
2025	Untamed	Scott Bodwin	Recurring role
2026	9-1-1	Slater	1 episode
