= Kate Beahan =

Australian actress (born 1974)

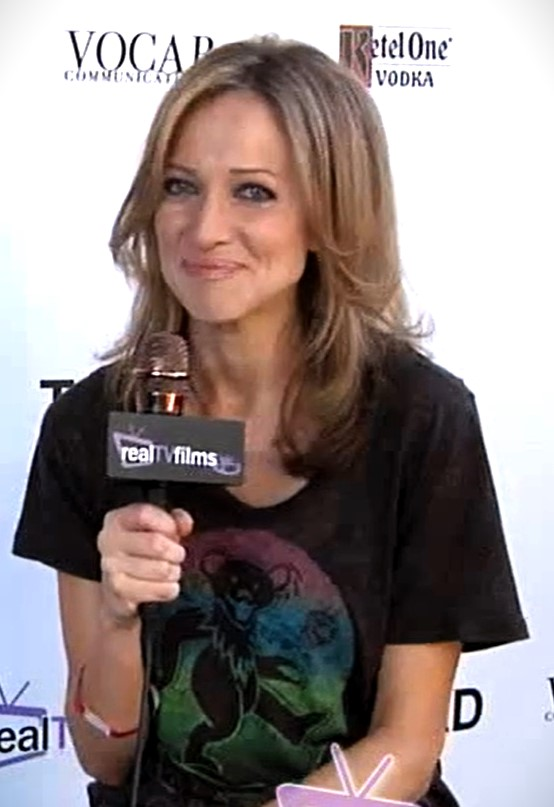
- Beahan at the 2011 Toronto International Film Festival
- Born: 12 October 1974 (age 52); Perth, Western Australia, Australia
- Other name: Kate Beehan
- Years active: 1993–present
- Parent: Michael Beahan

Kate Beahan (born 12 October 1974) is an Australian actress. Beahan was born in Perth. She appeared mostly in movies and TV series in Australia. Her best-known American film role was playing Sister Willow Woodward in the 2006 horror remake The Wicker Man opposite Nicolas Cage.

== Early life ==
Beahan was born and raised in Perth, Western Australia. Her father, Michael Beahan, was an Australian Labor Party Senator from Western Australia from 1987 to 1996.

She attended the University of Western Australia.

== Career ==
Beahan began her career appearing in theater productions in Perth and later, Sydney. She made her feature film debut in Strange Planet (1999), followed by a role in Chopper.

After relocating to the United States, Beahan was cast in lead roles in the thriller Flightplan (2005) opposite Jodie Foster, and opposite Nicolas Cage in Neil LaBute's The Wicker Man (2006), a remake of the 1973 British film of the same name. Subsequent roles included the psychological thriller The Return (2006) starring Sarah Michelle Gellar, and the independent drama One of Our Own (2007).

Beahan subsequently had supporting roles in the Australian films Burning Man (2011) and Goldstone (2016).

== Filmography ==
=== Film ===
Year	Title	Role	Notes	Ref.
1999	Strange Planet	Poppy		
2000	Chopper	Tanya		
2002	The Crocodile Hunter: Collision Course	Jo Buckley		
2002	Pending	Jasmine	Short	
2005	Flightplan	Stephanie		
2006	The Wicker Man	Sister Willow Woodward		
2006	The Return	Michelle		
2007	One of Our Own	Cathy		
2011	Burning Man	Lesley		
2012	My Mind's Own Melody	Melody	Short	
2014	Bet on Red	Red	Short	
2015	Urban Foraging	Australian	Short	
2015	Southbound	Cait		
2016	Goldstone	Pinky		
2019	The Report	Candace Ames		

=== Television ===
Year	Title	Role	Notes	Ref.
1997	The Gift	Enzo	Main role	
1999	Home and Away	Claire Andrews	Episodes: "1.2581", "1.2585", "1.2588"	
2000	Water Rats	Stephanie Kelly	Guest role (season 5)	
2001	Love Is a Four Letter Word	Alicia 'Albee' Barrett	Main role	
2001	Outriders	Rachel	Recurring role	
2001	Farscape	Hubero	Episode: "Fractures"	
2002	Seconds to Spare	Eve Lambert	TV film	
2002	Young Lions	Emma Greer	Episodes: "Arson Case", "The Priest"	
2003	BlackJack: Murder Archive	Julie Egan	TV film	
2003	After the Deluge	Margaret	TV film	
2003	Splitsville	Toby Pullman	TV film	
2008	Boston Legal	Audrey Patterson	Episode: "The Court Supreme"	
2010	Rake	Simone	Episode: "R vs Tanner"	
2012	Kendra	Macy	Episodes: "Versed", "Twilight", "Recovery", "Memory"	
2013	Perception	Ileana	Episode: "Caleidoscope"	
2013, 2015	Mistresses	Miranda Nickleby	Recurring role (seasons 1 & 3)	
2014	Jack Irish: Dead Point	Susan Ayliss	TV film	
2014	Franklin & Bash	Chelsea Beckman	Episode: "Kershaw v. Lincecum"	
2015	NCIS	Colette Girard	Episodes: "The Lost Boys", "Neverland"	
2015	NCIS: New Orleans	Naomi Parsons	Episode: "Foreign Affairs"	
2016	Devious Maids	Fiona Gladhart	Episodes: "Much Ado About Buffing", "Grime and Punishment", "I Saw the Shine"	
2017	Law & Order True Crime	Diane Sawyer	TV miniseries	
2018	Lucifer	Justine Doble	Episode: "All About Her"	
2018	Hawaii Five-0	Lady Helen	Episode: "Ahuwale Ka Nane Huna"	
2022	Troppo	Olivia	Main role	
2022–2023	Surviving Summer	Margot Torres	Recurring role (seasons 1 & 2)	
2022	Dynasty	Florence Whitley	Episodes: "More Power to Her", "Catch 22"	
2023	Extrapolations	Reporter #3	Episode: "2037: A Raven Story"	
2023	The Horror of Dolores Roach	Georgina Bellyard	Episodes: "Bitch, I've Already Been to Prison", "Bye, Felicia"	
