= The Aviary =

The Aviary may refer to:

- The Aviary (2005 film)
- The Aviary (2022 film)
- The Aviary (bar), a bar in Chicago
- The Aviary (group), a research group
- The Aviary (album), a 2017 album by Galantis
