= One of Our Own =

One of Our Own may refer to:

- One of Our Own (1975 film), a television film starring George Peppard
- One of Our Own (2007 film), an independent drama directed by Abe Levy
- "One of Our Own" (CSI: Miami), a 2006 episode of the TV series CSI: Miami
- "One of Our Own" (Morrissey song), from the 2014 album World Peace Is None of Your Business
