= Time Lapse (film) =

- Directed by: Bradley D. King
- Written by: Bradley D. King; BP Cooper
- Produced by: Kim Carney; BP Cooper; Sarah Craig; Rick Montgomery
- Starring: Danielle Panabaker; Matt O'Leary; George Finn
- Cinematography: Jonathan Wenstrup
- Edited by: Tom Cross
- Music by: Andrew Kaiser
- Production companies: Uncooperative Pictures, Veritas Productions
- Release date: April 18, 2014 (BIFFF)
- Running time: 104 minutes
- Country: United States
- Language: English

Time Lapse is a 2014 American indie sci-fi thriller directed by Bradley D. King and starring Danielle Panabaker, Matt O'Leary, and George Finn. King's directorial debut, it centers upon a group of friends who discover a machine that can take pictures of things 24 hours into the future, causing increasingly complex causal loops. It premiered on April 18, 2014 at the Brussels International Fantastic Film Festival.

== Plot ==
Finn (Matt O'Leary), a painter with a creative block, lives with his girlfriend Callie (Danielle Panabaker) and his best friend Jasper (George Finn) in an apartment complex where Finn works as a manager. Because elderly tenant Mr. Bezzerides (informally called "Mr. B." by the protagonists) has not paid his rent in two months, Callie checks on him, and discovers a strange machine in his apartment that takes Polaroid photos of their living room's picture window, apparently 24 hours in the future, always at 8 pm, although Mr. B.'s photo display includes daytime photos and is missing some photos. The friends check Mr. B.'s storage unit and find his inexplicably charred corpse; he has apparently been dead for a week. Gambling addict Jasper pushes to use the machine to win bets but is outvoted, and the next day's photo confirms they will do just that. It also shows that Finn has finally created a new painting; copying the work in the photo gets him past his block. Based on what happened to Mr. B. and notes in his journal, they theorize that they have to make sure the events in the photos occur, whatever they may be, or their timeline will stop and they will cease to be.

Several days go by. The friends cover up Mr. B.'s disappearance, including lying to the complex security guard, Big Joe, claiming the old man is in the hospital. After a week they get a disturbing photo: Callie kissing Jasper, while Finn paints in the background. Feeling that they have to do what's in the photos, they pose at 8pm the following night. But the actual kiss goes on too long while Finn paints, and he gets angry and jealous.

The next photo shows Jasper's violent bookie Ivan at the apartment. Not knowing why he would be there, Jasper calls him the next morning, saying he won't be making any bets that day. The call raises Ivan's suspicions, and he visits Jasper that night, learning of the machine. Ivan forces the friends to pose for the photos with many more gambling results for Ivan to make bets on. Finn and Jasper's friendship is strained by these events, as Ivan will be keeping each night's photo, preventing Finn from seeing his paintings. Jasper gets a cellphone picture of the next photo before giving it to Ivan's enforcer, Marcus. This photo shows a hastily made skull and crossbones on the canvas, which Jasper believes is a warning to themselves, so he hides weapons (a kitchen knife, golf club, and hammer) near the couch.

The next evening, Finn runs into Big Joe at the gate, who has just gotten a job as a police officer. Marcus sees their meeting and calls Ivan, who does not believe their story about Big Joe. Ivan threatens all of them, but Jasper convinces him that tonight's new photo is of Ivan's death at Marcus' hands. While Ivan is retrieving the photo, Jasper stabs Marcus and then clubs Ivan to death on his return. They hide the bodies in Mr. B.'s storage unit. Finn and Callie fight, so Finn sleeps on the couch. Later that night, they are visited by Mr. B.'s colleague, Dr. Heidecker, who is looking for Mr. B. When Finn and Jasper can't keep their stories straight about Mr. B., Heidecker levels a gun at them and forces them to confess. Mr. B. had mailed Heidecker a photo that covers the next night, but it was taken before his death, meaning that the machine can be set to take photos more than 24 hours in advance. The photo shows blood on the window, Mr. B.'s hat on the friends' couch (Jasper has taken to wearing the dead man's hat), and a picture of a green coil resembling the broken device on the ground next to Mr. B.'s corpse. Heidecker theorizes that "time" did not kill Mr. B. for trying to change the future; rather, he knocked over a coil in his storage unit and the released gas killed him. As she does not know how to adjust the settings of the machine, Jasper shoots Heidecker dead using Ivan's gun.

The next night's photo shows Callie and Jasper having sex in the window with Finn unconscious on the couch. Finn talks with Jasper to try to devise a way to prevent events, but Jasper knocks him out and locks him in Mr. B.'s storage unit; he does not believe Heidecker's theory and intends to prevent a paradox, making sure that events correspond to the photo happen no matter what. Trying to find a way out of the locked storage unit, Finn searches Heidecker's purse and finds the photo with the blood, Mr. B.'s hat, and the painting of the coil; he realizes that he must be able to escape in order to paint the coil the next day, so that Mr. B. could take a picture of it in the first place. Finding Mr. B.'s keys, Finn escapes, goes to the machine, and calls Jasper, threatening to destroy it if Jasper does not stop. A fight ensues, culminating with Callie smashing Jasper's head in.

When making the painting to match Heidecker's photo, Finn realizes a discrepancy. He discovers that the camera also takes a photo at 8 am, a truth which Callie kept to herself. Callie reveals that she has been using the morning photos to send herself messages to manipulate events, and rekindle her relationship with Finn. The sex photo is one of those missing from Mr. B's wall, from a drunken night (recalled as charades night by Callie) a month ago (the other missing photos are ones of Callie and Jasper being affectionate, which she took down from the wall when she first discovered the machine). Finn rejects Callie and goes to destroy the machine, so she shoots him - telling him that she will fix everything, none of this would have happened, and they would have not had this conversation - creating the blood splatter on the window from Heidecker's photo.

Callie writes a warning message on a piece of paper, and sticks it to the window, believing that when her past self sees it via the photo, she will get the message, which will prevent the events of the previous 24 hours from happening. While she is doing so, Big Joe stops by, discovers the murdered Jasper and Finn, and arrests her. As Callie is led away by Joe - confident that the timeline will reset - the note she left falls off the window; the timeline is, in fact, immutable, and Callie was mistaken in thinking she had any control over it. The camera takes the photo that Mr. B. had mailed to Heidecker before he died, and generates another photo, which is left unrevealed.

== Cast ==
- Danielle Panabaker as Callie
- Matt O'Leary as Finn
- George Finn as Jasper
- Amin Joseph as Big Joe
- Jason Spisak as Ivan
- David Figlioli as Marcus
- Sharon Maughan as Dr. Heidecker
- Judith Drake as Mrs. Anderson
- John Rhys-Davies as Mr. Bezzerides

== Influences ==
The relationship dynamics among the three main characters and the single location in Time Lapse are also drawn from Danny Boyle's 1994 film Shallow Grave.

As a low-budget drama focused on time paradox, it has been compared with Shane Carruth's Primer.

Time Lapse also has several elements in common with episode 46 of The Twilight Zone called "A Most Unusual Camera": there are 3 protagonists, two male and one female, they come into possession of a camera that can take pictures of 5 minutes into the future, and they also use it to win money from horse races.

== Reception ==
Critical reception for Time Lapse has been positive. On review aggregation website Rotten Tomatoes, the film holds an approval rating of 78% based on 18 reviews, with an average rating of 6.40/10.

Bloody Disgusting praised the film, and The Hollywood Reporter complimented it for making "the most of a simple brain-teasing premise". The Digital Journal also praised the movie, writing "It’s not unconventional or particularly ground-breaking, but it is a solid piece of storytelling." Variety also reviewed the movie positively, stating that "the pic never feels claustrophobic despite largely being confined to the protagonists’ flat. All tech/design contributions are savvy but unobtrusive, never wresting attention from an ingenious narrative measured out in unhurried yet always-engaging terms."

=== Awards ===
- Best Actor/Actress for Danielle Panabaker at the London Independent Film Festival (2014, won)
- Best Feature at the Fantaspoa International Fantastic Film Festival (2014, won)
- Best Feature at the Thriller Chiller Film Festival (2014, won)
- Best Feature at the Portsmouth International Film Festival (2014, won)
- Best Feature at the Atlanta Underground Film Festival (2014, won)
- Best Feature at the Burbank International Film Festival (2014, won)
- Best Feature at the Austin Other Worlds (2014, won)
- Best International Feature at the London Independent Film Festival (2014, won)
- Best Foreign Feature at the Fantafestival (2014, won)
- Best Drama Feature at the Atlanta Horror Film Festival (2014, won)
- Best Feature Audience Award at the Ithaca International Fantastic Film Festival (2014, won)
- Best International Sci-Fi Feature at the Trieste Science+Fiction Festival (2014, won)
- Best Sci-Fi Feature at the Feratum Film Festival (2014, won)
- Golden Honu Award for Best Feature at the Big Island Film Festival (2014, won)
- Best Horror/Sci-Fi Feature at the Crystal Palace International Film Festival (2014, won)
- Shriekfest Award for Best SciFi Feature at the Shriekfest (2014, won)
- Vortex Grand Prize Best Sci-Fi Feature at the Rhode Island International Horror Festival (2014, won)
- Best Screenplay at the Maverick Movie Awards (2014, won)
- Best Screenplay at the Orlando Film Festival (2014, won)
- Best Screenplay at the Austin Other Worlds (2014, won)
- Best International Screenplay at the Rojo Sangre Film Festival (2014, won)
- Indie Cities Breakthrough Film at the Twin Cities Film Festival (2014, won)
