= Raymond Scott Daigle =

American filmmaker

Raymond Scott Daigle is an American filmmaker. Among other films, he directed the cult copy store comedy Replica Redux. He also has directed dozens of short films and documentaries, often in collaboration with Daedalus Howell. Daigle is the founder of Daigle Digital, a San Francisco Bay Area production company.

Daigle re-released Replica in its "redux" version on YouTube in 2012. It follows a night-in-the-lives of several copy store employees. The entire film was shot after hours in a Fed-Ex Kinkos without corporate knowledge.
