= List of Franklin & Bash episodes =

Franklin & Bash is an American legal comedy-drama series created by Kevin Falls and Bill Chais that originally aired on TNT. It stars Breckin Meyer as Jared Franklin, and Mark-Paul Gosselaar as Peter Bash, two unconventional lawyers and longtime friends that are recruited by the head of a firm to bring new life and perspective to the work place. Franklin & Bash premiered on June 1, 2011 and ended on October 22, 2014, with a total of 40 episodes over the course of four seasons.

== Series overview ==
Season	Episodes	Originally released	
Season	Episodes	First released	Last released
1	10	June 1, 2011	August 3, 2011
2	10	June 5, 2012	August 14, 2012
3	10	June 19, 2013	August 14, 2013
4	10	August 13, 2014	October 22, 2014

== Episodes ==
=== Season 1 (2011) ===
No. overall	No. in season	Title	Directed by	Written by	Original release date	U.S. viewers (millions)
1	1	"Pilot"	Jason Ensler	Kevin Falls & Bill Chais	June 1, 2011	2.74
Two young, nontraditional lawyers, Jared Franklin and Peter Bash, are offered jobs at Infeld & Daniels, a prominent law firm led by Stanton Infeld, who decides to recruit the pair to energize his firm. They also bring along their legal aides, ex-con and investigator Carmen Phillips, and agoraphobe and researcher Pindar Singh, to help with their cases.
2	2	"She Came Upstairs To Kill Me"	Jason Ensler	Jeff Rake	June 8, 2011	2.61
Franklin and Bash defend Isabella Kaplowitz (Natalie Zea), a celebrity being charged with murdering her husband, Harry (Cody Horstman) by having too much sex. Harry's lawyer friend Wallace Clayton (Fred Willard) is prosecuting her in court. Sensing that either the judge or the jury is in on the take, the guys use unorthodox tactics to get justice for their client.
3	3	"Jennifer of Troy"	Andrew Fleming	Dana Calvo	June 15, 2011	2.88
A plain woman believes she was fired from her high-profile position at a magazine company for being too attractive and seeks legal representation to get her job back. Meanwhile, Stanton helps Franklin and Bash's friend who's been shunned from Chinatown after being accused of stealing rabbit meat to feed his pet boa constrictor.
4	4	"Bro-Bono"	Jason Ensler	Bill Chais & Kevin Falls	June 22, 2011	2.76
Peter represents Jared's old college enemy Danny Dubois (Michael Weaver) in a legal matter and they begin to see him another light. Also Infeld asks Franklin to take the lead on a divorce case with a feuding husband (Harry Hamlin) and wife (Bre Blair) when Karp and Hanna's past prevents them from working together.
5	5	"You Can't Take It With You"	Andrew Fleming	Matt McGuiness	June 29, 2011	2.54
Two immature brothers sue their father and sister over a 1988 World Series Kirk Gibson home run baseball they believe is rightfully theirs and Jared's father, Leonard Franklin (Beau Bridges) defends his clients against his son in the same case. Meanwhile, Bash works with Hanna to defend a reality TV star dad (Tom Arnold). Also, Karp seeks Pindar's help on a secret project about removing a dirty video.
6	6	"Big Fish"	Fred Savage	Kristi Korzec	July 6, 2011	2.58
A wealthy CEO, Carter Lang (Jason Alexander) who believes he only has two more months to live hires Franklin and Bash wanting to liquidate his financial assets in his company. Meanwhile, Karp and Hanna seek Pindar's help to attain a new client (Sarayu Rao) who just happens to be Indian and a germaphobe like him.
7	7	"Franklin vs. Bash"	Steve Robin	Bill Krebs	July 13, 2011	2.54
Jared and Peter decide that for them to win a case, they have to go against each other while representing two pole-dancing instructors (Marisa Petroro and Jud Tylor) who are charged with stealing from their wealthy clients. Karp and Hanna defend a 13-year-old boy whose father is taking him to court over him wanting to kayak the Amazon.
8	8	"The Bangover"	Steve Robin	Sandy Isaac	July 20, 2011	2.34
Judge Sturgess (Kathy Najimy) places Franklin and Bash on house arrest instead of contempt of court for having a lightsaber duel in her courtroom. Infeld's niece Lily who is visiting from London faces the unsympathetic Judge Harper (Tommy Chong) when she is charged with possession of marijuana. Carmen's con man ex-boyfriend Dante (Leonard Roberts) puts her in a legal dilemma when he leaves behind a backpack full of money, making Pindar the only lawyer to represent her in court.
9	9	"Bachelor Party"	Jason Ensler	Aeden Babish	July 27, 2011	2.84
Janie requests the services of Peter after finding her fiancé Nathan (James Van Der Beek) in some legal trouble during his bachelor party. Jared goes back to his high school for a case where a teacher (Alexandra Breckenridge) is accused of sleeping with a student.
10	10	"Go Tell It on the Mountain"	Jason Ensler	Bill Chais	August 3, 2011	2.54
Franklin and Bash team up with a high-profile attorney (Tricia Helfer) to defend their boss Infeld, who is charged with murder. But things start to go wrong when the trial seems to be sabotaged, Karp puts his job on the line by trying to save his uncle. Meanwhile, Hannah represents a professional wrestler (Danny Trejo) who fights for his job back after he's fired for being too old.

=== Season 2 (2012) ===
No. overall	No. in season	Title	Directed by	Written by	Original release date	U.S. viewers (millions)
11	1	"Strange Brew"	Jason Ensler	Matt McGuinness	June 5, 2012	3.07
Franklin and Bash, in an attempt to secure their positions as partners, decide to get a client without the aid of an executive. However, this leads them to have to try a small business owner. Meanwhile, attempting to help a friend with a case after he is tried for drinking on the beach, Peter makes things difficult when he falls for the cop in charge of the arrest (Kat Foster).
12	2	"Viper"	Timothy Busfield	Dana Calvo	June 12, 2012	2.89
Jared and Peter try their first manslaughter case when they defend a wannabe crime fighter (Sean Astin) accused of chasing down a man who later died. Meanwhile, Peter's mom (Jane Seymour) arrives with some news that results in a change of living arrangements for her son, while Pindar seeks Carmen's help in battling his phobias.
13	3	"Jango and Rossi"	Jason Ensler	Kevin Falls & Breckin Meyer	June 19, 2012	2.95
Facing a pair of rival lawyers (Eric Mabius and Seth Green), Peter and Jared do Stanton a favor by helping out one of his ex-wives (Cybill Shepherd) with a custody case, bringing up emotions from Stanton. Meanwhile, Damien teams up with Pindar to fight a case involving a man being tried for robbing a pizza restaurant.
14	4	"For Those About to Rock"	Allan Arkush	Bill Chais	June 26, 2012	3.57
Jared has to be a small claims court judge in order to get rid of a citation, and he makes a ruling that doesn't go over well with the rock and roll community; as a result, Jared and his dad battle over the case of a rock and roll icon (Peter Weller) and his son (Joel David Moore). Meanwhile, Infeld tries to clear his spiritual adviser from the charge of fraud.
15	5	"L'affaire Du Coeur"	Kevin Bray	Bill Krebs	July 3, 2012	3.20
Peter is asked to defend a high profile judge after facing arrest due to an affair with a lawyer. Peter is closer to falling in love with Janie. Meanwhile, Karp defends a friend from college who has to prove his sexual orientation so he can keep his trophy.
16	6	"Voir Dire"	John Landis	Kevin Falls & Bill Chais	July 10, 2012	2.72
Peter and Jared defend a shop worker against charges of a pre-meditated attack, but while selecting jurors for the case the lawyers receive too much free advice. Meanwhile, Infeld Daniels' associate partners program begins, and young lawyers are partnered with DA's at the firm. Jared and Peter have to try a case in front of a DA that has some bad history with Peter. Guest star: Danielle Panabaker
17	7	"Summer Girls"	Elizabeth Allen	Aeden Babish	July 17, 2012	2.88
Peter and Jared ask for Hanna's help in the court martial of two Navy sailors (Kayla Ewell and Gabrielle Dennis) charged with assaulting personnel, but Jared and Peter don't realize there is an ulterior motive that Hanna has in mind.
18	8	"Last Dance"	Jason Alexander	Kristi Korzec & Matt McGuinness	July 24, 2012	2.54
Jared and Peter help a widow get her husband's body back to properly bury him rather than the odd way he was intended to be buried. Someone is thought to be stalking Stanton and Karp thinks that maybe the stalker is someone from prison out to get revenge. Hanna runs into an old friend from college and an old romance is suddenly reignited.
19	9	"Waiting on a Friend"	Colin Bucksey	Pat Sheehan & Bill Chais	July 31, 2012	2.16
A former client accuses Peter and Jared of misconduct, spinning into motion an internal investigation against the duo and putting their jobs in peril and making them realize what's really important to them.
20	10	"650 to SLC"	Elizabeth Allen	Dana Calvo & Kevin Falls	August 14, 2012	2.82
Leonard Franklin of Franklin & Franklin attempts to buy the firm out from under Infeld.

=== Season 3 (2013) ===
No. overall	No. in season	Title	Directed by	Written by	Original release date	U.S. viewers (millions)
21	1	"Coffee and Cream"	Mike Listo	Bill Chais & Matt McGuinness	June 19, 2013	1.97
Franklin and Bash are embarrassed on national television by a new lawyer, Rachel King (Heather Locklear), that will join the firm. A magician (Adam Goldberg) has trouble finding his bracelet. Damien may regret releasing a video that he hopes will speed the process of his upcoming judicial appointment but that may have some unintended consequences. Pindar’s termite problems result in some unfortunate decisions having to be made.
22	2	"Dead and Alive"	Jay Chandrasekhar	Bill Krebs & Kevin Falls	June 19, 2013	1.97
Peter, Jared, Pindar, and Carmen move into Infeld's home due to Pindy burning down Peter and Jared's old home. Peter meets Charlie (Nicky Whelan) outside the house. Jared and Peter must prove that a veteran is alive after being listed as dead due to an error and get his house back. Infeld worries Karp when he acts strange because of a lady whose visa will run out.
23	3	"Good Lovin'"	Arlene Sanford	Jamie Pachino	June 26, 2013	2.20
Peter’s Mom gets him in big trouble after she is arrested on prostitution charges. Jared causes more trouble for Peter because of his affair with the DA leaves Peter having to put his mother on the stand. Damien hopes to see if he can get a judge’s seat before he retires and hopes he can speed up the process.
24	4	"Captain Johnny"	Richie Keen	Nicki Renna & Matt McGuinness	July 3, 2013	2.20
Jared and Peter make a wager with Rachel over whose case will improve the firm's profile. While Franklin & Bash represent a fishing boat captain in a piracy case, Rachel and Karp represent a psychic in a wrongful termination suit. Meanwhile, when Peter acquires a couch left sitting on a curb, it reignites a long-standing feud between Infeld and Rob Lowe in which Jared, Peter and Pindar are now involved. John Ratzenberger guest stars as Judge Elliot Reid, who is presiding over Franklin & Bash's case.
25	5	"By the Numbers"	Arlene Sanford	Jamie Pachino	July 10, 2013	2.18
After previously beating him in court on a different charge, Peter and Jared help their client (Martin Starr) clear his name after buying a life insurance policy from a dying woman. Meanwhile Damien and Stanton help a local beekeeper and Peter learns that Charlie has a child.
26	6	"Freck"	Colin Bucksey	Richard Hewett & Kevin Falls	July 17, 2013	1.96
One of Peter and Jared's closest friends Robbie Ambriano (Eddie Jemison) is up on a murder charge and they decide to help him. They know that he likes to play practical jokes on people so is this murder a joke or the real thing? Damien takes on a case where the business hires former criminals and Peter meets Charlie's daughter, but she seems more interested in Pindar.
27	7	"Control"	Michael Zinberg	Story by : Matt McGuinness; Teleplay by : Jamie Pachino & Matt McGuinness	July 24, 2013	2.14
Franklin & Bash are hired by a minor league baseball star (Aaron Hill) who is being targeted for abuse game after game. Rachel King's brother is in town and asks her for help regarding a problem and the judge that Karp is warming up to is found dead on a golf course.
28	8	"Out of the Blue"	Jeff Bleckner	Bill Krebs	July 31, 2013	2.30
Rachel tells Franklin & Bash to court a potential client (Scott Michael Campbell) who has found fame after a priceless meteorite has struck his home. Meanwhile Infield defends his nephew Damien, who has been charged with the murder of Judge Dinsdale. When all seems to be going wrong, Karp hires Jared and Peter to defend him.
29	9	"Shoot to Thrill"	David Paymer	Bill Chais	August 7, 2013	2.06
Peter and Jared defend their friend Harley (Thomas Lennon), a bounty hunter who has been charged with using excessive force to apprehend a suspect which results in a courtroom demonstration that goes wrong for Peter. Jared arranges a double date to make amends and Charlie shows up to the bar where the date is happening. Karp has a taken a back seat attitude to life and Pindar crashes his drone onto Rob Lowe's deck where we see Charlie behind him.
30	10	"Gone in a Flash"	Mike Listo	Kevin Falls	August 14, 2013	2.17
Peter and Jared must deal with an insurance investigator (Jay Chandrasekhar) who thinks they committed arson while also dealing with further problems from Rob Lowe. Rob Lowe and Stanton have a final confrontation in their long feud. Rachel and Damien battle over an opening on the bench. Guest star : Rob Lowe

=== Season 4 (2014) ===
No. overall	No. in season	Title	Directed by	Written by	Original release date	U.S. viewers (millions)
31	1	"The Curse of Hor-Aha"	Kevin Bray	Bill Chais & Kevin Falls	August 13, 2014	1.24
When Infeld is disbarred after Rachel King embezzles from the firm, Peter and Jared are left in charge and struggle to keep the firm afloat while dealing with a new investigator, several senior partners quitting and defending an archaeologist in a rental dispute. Meanwhile, former ADA Ellen Swatello, new to Infeld Daniels, defends a local marijuana distributor and Peter and Jared try to clear Infeld's name and get him back to the firm.
32	2	"Kershaw vs. Lincecum"	Paul Holahan	Dana Calvo	August 20, 2014	1.20
In order to get an extension on the office's rent, Jared and Peter must secure tickets to a major baseball game. In order to do so, though, they have to jump through a series of hoops, including doing a favor for Karp, who has the tickets they need. Meanwhile, the duo also takes on the case of a woman seeking a divorce from her husband, a plastic surgeon who just happens to be Franklin & Bash's tenant, while also seeking to get Infeld's law license reinstated by claiming he's a sex addict. Guest Stars: Willie Garson, Kate Beahan
33	3	"Love is the Drug"	David Grossman	Bill Krebs	August 27, 2014	1.29
Infeld has returned to the firm, but his return is a rocky one when he punches a restaurant manager, reigniting a feud. Meanwhile, Franklin & Bash defend a local cab driver who's accused of stealing from celebrities. His defense: he's in love with his co-conspirator. Guest Stars: John Michael Higgins and Mike Tyson
34	4	"Good Cop/Bad Cop"	Richie Keen	Matt McGuinness	September 3, 2014	1.25
Peter & Jared cross paths with a crooked cop while trying a land grabbing case and they recruit Peter's ex, Officer Wendy (Kat Foster), for help.
35	5	"Deep Throat"	Colin Bucksey	Alex Berger	September 10, 2014	1.27
Peter and Jared defend the son of Peter's high school flame when he's accused of running a false story about a fellow student in the school newspaper. Meanwhile, Jared and Swatello have to fill out HR forms detailing the nature of their relationship and discover that they're not exactly on the same page. Also, Infeld passes off a new tenant as a fellow lawyer and they assist their property manager in a lawsuit against a dry cleaner over some expensive pants.
36	6	"Dance the Night Away"	Bill Chais	Bill Chais	September 17, 2014	1.52
Jared exchanges his legal services in exchange for the title of Duke and soon finds himself in a land dispute with a rival family. Meanwhile, Jared and Peter represent an injured stripper and, in order to win their case, make a bold move in attempting to unionize Los Angeles's strippers. Karp rejoins the firm following some mediation between Stanton, Jared Peter and Peter's mother, Colleen. A wild royal party leads to an unexpected moment between Colleen and Jared.
37	7	"Honor Thy Mother"	Mark-Paul Gosselaar	Breckin Meyer & Kevin Falls	September 24, 2014	1.17
Peter and Jared deal with the fallout of Jared's drunken night with Colleen Bash while also helping defend their favorite diner when it is shut down. Pindar returns and announces his engagement to a woman (Carmen Electra) Peter and Jared suspect isn't real.
38	8	"Falcon's Nest"	Mike Listo	Alex Berger & Denise Harkavy	October 1, 2014	0.79
Peter and Jared help their old friend, Danny Dubois, when he is threatened with eviction from the retirement community he resides at. Meanwhile, Karp and Anita take on the case of a research scientist who missed a flight to a grant interview due to an "act of God" that prevented the plane from flying, prompting Karp to pull a page from the Franklin & Bash playbook.
39	9	"Spirits in the Material World"	Arlene Sanford	Bill Chais & Patrick Sheehan	October 15, 2014	0.88
Peter and Jared go up against their former prodigy, Bonnie Apell (Danielle Panabaker) for a case about a haunted house.
40	10	"Red or Black"	Richie Keen	Bill Chais & Bill Krebs	October 22, 2014	0.98
Peter and Jared are urgently called by Infeld to Las Vegas claiming he'd die that night. Anita and Damien decide to make their relationship official. Ellen Swatello (Rhea Seehorn) rushes to Las Vegas assuming Jared is eloping with Bonnie.
