= Quantum Deadline =

2015 novel by Daedalus Howell

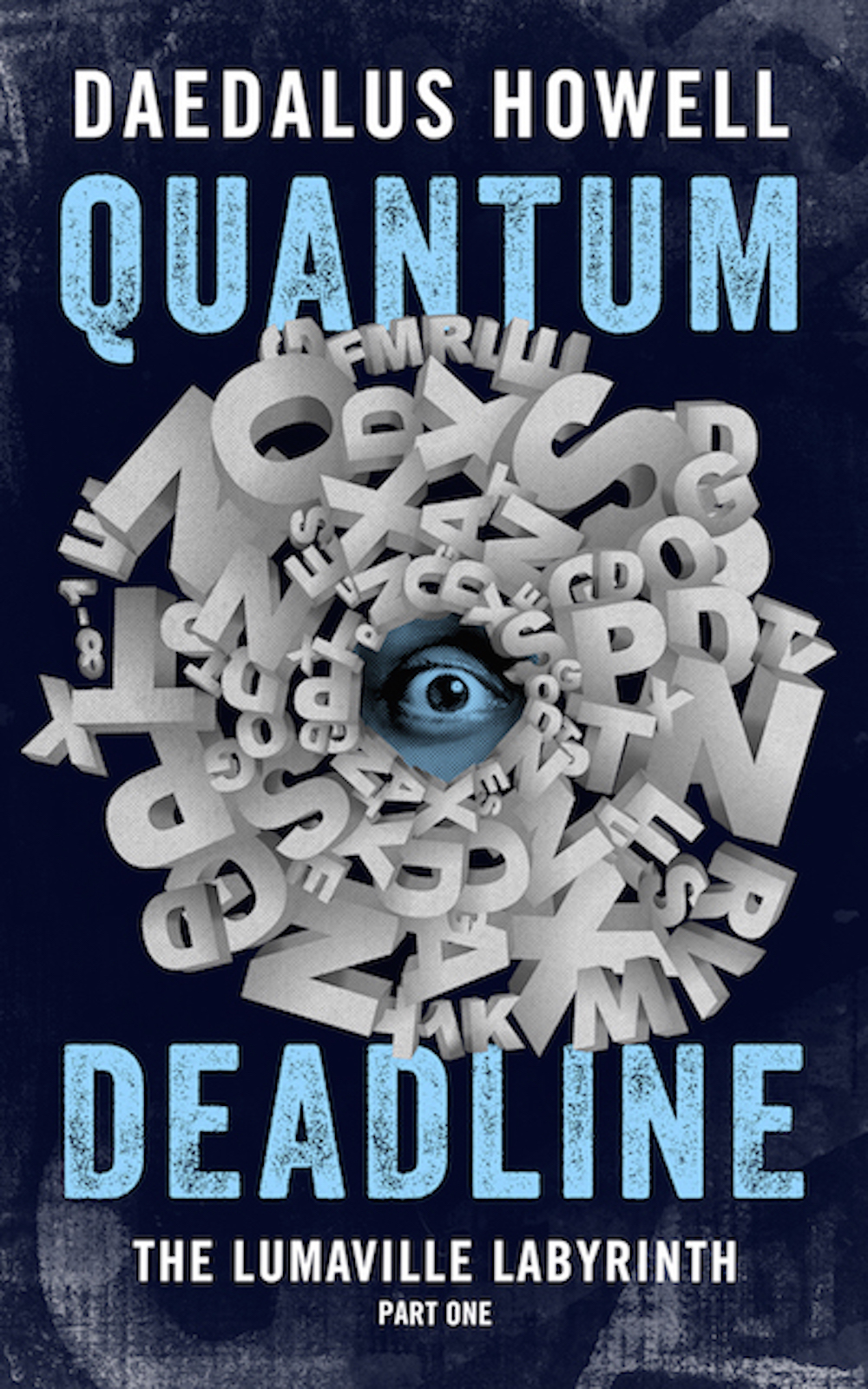
- First edition paperback cover
- Author: Daedalus Howell
- Original title: Quantum Deadline
- Language: English
- Genre: Satire/Science fiction/Noir/Paranormal
- Publisher: FMRL
- Publication date: 2015
- Publication place: United States
- Media type: Print (paperback) and ebook
- Pages: 250
- ISBN: 9780967100173
- Preceded by: The Late Projectionist

Quantum Deadline is a novel by American writer and filmmaker Daedalus Howell. Published in paperback in 2015 by FMRL, the novel is a seriocomic pastiche of paranormal, sci-fi, and neo-noir detective genres. It is the first book of Howell's Lumaville Labyrinth series and part of his "Lumaverse" story world, which includes the feature film Pill Head, written and directed by Howell. Quantum Deadline shares the same narrator as the author's first novel, The Late Projectionist, though, in Quantum Deadline, the protagonist's name is the same as the author's, i.e., "Daedalus Howell."

== Plot ==
Prior to the events of the contemporary-set novel, journalist Daedalus Howell's intern has committed suicide by jumping off the Golden Gate Bridge, an event for which the character feels responsible and that has sullied his professional reputation. Forced to work for a second-rate blog, Howell is still trying to clear his conscious and his byline five years later. Then he and Jude, a lost 11-year-old thief, happen to both witness a murder in a discount men's suit shop. When they re-meet during the investigation, the boy claims to know Howell but from a parallel universe. He proves this to the reporter by using his original, not professional name, which was Kit Fergus (a.k.a. "Chris F." in Howell's previous novel The Late Projectionist). Jude claims he found a smartphone loaded with a game called The Knights of Skeldaria. An Easter egg in the app sent him to Howell's universe where no records of his existence can be found to the consternation of Detective Shane, Howell's wary friend. Howell pitches Jude's story to his editor at the local news blog he writes for but is dispatched to cover a 100-year-old's birthday instead. There he meets Mac, an elderly and retired reporter who claims to have written the notorious "Dewey Defeats Truman" headline, except where he came from it was correct. Mac, like Jude, is from a parallel universe and urges Howell to help the boy. When Howell contacts Detective Shane seeking information, the boy has vanished. Howell resolves to find and help the boy as a means of reconciling with the intern he was unable to talk out of suicide. This leads him to both his ex-girlfriend, Annika Strang, an artificial intelligence researcher, and his old college friend and sometime rival Cameron Block, whose success in tech — particularly the Knights of Skeldaria video game — has long rankled Howell. The reporter connects the dots between Block and Strang's research and the Easter egg Jude alleges to have activated, which brought him into Howell's universe. Hijinks ensue, leading to a fatal showdown between Howell and Block.

== Critical reception ==
Carly Fjeld of SciFi Bloggers observed that Quantum Deadline was "A wonderful blend of mystery, science fiction and dark comedy that keeps readers from putting the story down." Others, such as the North Bay Bohemian's Stett Holbrook found the novel difficult to categorize due to its multi-genre approach. "Daedalus Howell's novel Quantum Deadline: The Lumaville Labyrinth is hard to categorize. Let's call it a noirish, sci-fi-lite detective story with a heap of self-parody that's by turns poignant, witty and comic... With humor and verve, the novel takes up some of the experiences and struggles within Howell's personal and professional life. He says he likes to explore 'the liminal space between truth and fact' as it relates to himself," wrote Holbrook.

Additionally, the genesis of Quantum Deadline was discussed with the Petaluma Argus-Courier in regard to its author having lived next door to kidnap and murder victim Polly Klaas, whose case is cited as an influence.

Bruce Robinson, a host at NPR affiliate KRCB-FM, observed that Quantum Deadline "Playfully meshes stylistic conventions with a sardonic self-deprecating protagonist." In the same interview, Howell, admitted that his creative process amounts to drinking a bottle of wine and weeping.

In the Pacific Sun, columnist David Templeton characterized the work was a "hard-to-categorize novel, a kind of nourishing, comedic, satirical sci-fi mystery."
