= The Return (2006 film) =

- Theatrical release poster
- Directed by: Asif Kapadia
- Written by: Adam Sussman
- Produced by: Aaron Ryder; Jeffrey Silver
- Starring: Sarah Michelle Gellar; Peter O'Brien; Adam Scott; Kate Beahan; Sam Shepard
- Cinematography: Roman Osin
- Edited by: Claire Simpson
- Music by: Dario Marianelli
- Production companies: Intrepid Pictures; Raygun Productions
- Distributed by: Rogue Pictures
- Release date: November 10, 2006 (U.S.)
- Running time: 86 minutes
- Language: English
- Budget: $15 million
- Box office: $11.9 million

The Return is a 2006 American independent psychological horror film directed by Asif Kapadia and starring Sarah Michelle Gellar as a businesswoman haunted by memories of her childhood and the mysterious death of a young woman. Kate Beahan, Adam Scott, Peter O'Brien, and Sam Shepard also appear in the film.

It was released theatrically by Rogue Pictures on November 10, 2006, and on DVD on February 27, 2007. The Blu-ray was released on October 6, 2009. The film was both a critical and commercial failure.

== Plot ==
Joanna Mills (Sarah Michelle Gellar), a travelling representative for a trucking company, is dedicated to her successful career but something of a loner. Since the age of 11, she has been a troubled person, with episodes of self-mutilation and menacing visions. Normally she avoids returning to her native Texas, but agrees to a trip there to secure an important client. During the trip her visions, which take the form of memories of events not from her life, increase in intensity. She sees a strange face staring back at her in the mirror. Her truck radio plays Patsy Cline's "Sweet Dreams" no matter what station she selects. She stops at the scene of an accident that, on the following day, seems not to have happened. Joanna cuts herself in a bar restroom and is narrowly rescued by a friend. She visits her father, who observes that from 11, she was "a different girl". The visions continue, becoming both more specific and more threatening, centering upon a menacing man she does not recognize and a bar she has never seen, but a picture of which is in one of her catalogs.

Drawn by the image to the Texas town where the bar is located, a place she has not been since childhood, Joanna meets a man named Terry Stahl, whose wife, Annie, was stalked, brutally assaulted, and left to die fifteen years before, a crime of which Terry was suspected but not convicted. Joanna continues to have visions of this crime and the events that led up to it, and to discover other links between Annie's life and hers. She meets the real killer and is led by what she has seen in her visions to recover the knife he used from its hiding place. She is then stalked, herself. She finds herself drawn into a repetition of the crime, but this time she stabs her assailant with the recovered knife, using the original weapon to avenge the original crime.

The story ends with the revelation that Annie, clinging to life as Terry drove her to the hospital after the original assault, died when his car crashed into one driven by Joanna's father, in which the eleven-year-old Joanna was a passenger. Shortly after she expires, Joanna starts awake, with the implication that Annie's soul has reincarnated in her body, therefore "a different girl". As the movie ends, a silent Joanna is seen reflecting on who she is and what has happened to her.

== Cast ==
- Sarah Michelle Gellar as Joanna Mills
  - Darrian Mcclanahan as Young Joanna Mills
- Sam Shepard as Ed Mills
- Peter O'Brien as Terry Stahl
- Kate Beahan as Michelle
- Adam Scott as Kurt

== Production ==
Rogue Pictures, a subsidiary of Focus Features, produced the film, on an estimated budget of $15 million. Asif Kapadia was helmed to direct, with a screenplay by Adam Sussman. A lengthy pre-production for his independent drama Far North (2007) allowed Kapadia to sign on to direct the film. He later described it as "a very tough experience", and remarked: "I was bought in and got paid just as the director. Well […] I'm sure what doesn't kill you makes you stronger! It nearly killed me". For the film, Kapadia brought cinematographer Roman Osin and composer Dario Marianelli, both of whom had previously worked with him.

Shooting for The Return took place in Austin, Texas, starting in the week of March 11, 2005. The script was originally called Revolver, but during production, the name was changed due to Guy Ritchie's Revolver (2005) being released beforehand.

== Reception ==
=== Box office ===
Except for trailers and television spots, there was no publicity nor a premiere for The Return, as Sarah Michelle Gellar was busy shooting Possession in Vancouver, British Columbia. The film opened in ninth place with a $4.8 million weekend gross, and ultimately earned $7.7 million domestically. Worldwide, it made $11.9 million.

=== Critical response ===
Reviews of the film were generally negative, with a 15% positive score on Rotten Tomatoes. The biggest criticism was the very slow pace. The artistic tone and cinematography of the film were praised, as was the film as a whole by some, though the average rating was a 3.9/10.

Gregory Kirschling of Entertainment Weekly gave the film a C rating and concluded: "Mellow —nay, snoozy— atmospherics trump actual scares, and it makes almost zero sense." Peter Hartlaub of San Francisco Chronicle felt that the film "is more frustrating than it is bad. For every question answered, three more pop up until the whole thing is sort-of explained in a confusing and unsatisfying finish. It's like watching the entire run of The X-Files in 88 minutes." He also remarked: "Gellar may never get another good script outside the genre, but she's perfect for this material —likeable and brazen enough that you don't blame her for making stupid decisions that are sure to get her killed."

Writing for Time Out, Nigel Floyd was more favourable, stating that "this mild but involving supernatural thriller from British director Asif Kapadia (The Warrior) majors in creeping unease and occasional shocks rather than violent horror." He further said that "Kapadia's fluid storytelling and Roman Osin's ravishing cinematography create subtle, unnerving menace out of flat vistas, decaying industrial architecture, claustrophobic interiors and old-fashioned in-camera effects. Sadly, Adam Sussman's script is so thin you can see right through it."
