= Lisa Marcos =

Canadian actress

- Born: March 15, 1982 (age 44); Toronto, Ontario, Canada
- Occupation: Actress
- Years active: 2002–present
- Notable work: TV works The Listener Film works Diary of a Mad Black Woman

Lisa Marcos (born March 15, 1982) is a Canadian actress and former model.

== Career ==
She began her career as a model at the age of 14 years but after eight years, decided to pursue her passion for acting and approached a talent agency. Soon after her acting career began in 2002 with a guest role on Soul Food. She is best known as Charlie Marks in the television series The Listener.

== Filmography ==
=== Film ===
Year	Title	Role	Notes
2003	The Gospel of John	Bride	
2003	Threshold	Peg	
2005	Diary of a Mad Black Woman	Brenda	
2005	King's Ransom	Raven	
2010	Mother's Day	Julie Ross	
2014	Dead of Winter	Eve	

=== Television ===
Year	Title	Role	Notes
2002	Doc	Assistant	Episode: "The Commercial"
2002	Soul Food	Bianca	Episode: "Stranger Than Fiction"
2002	Street Time	Waitress / Bar Maid	Episodes: "Respect", "Instant Karma"
2002	Adventure Inc.	Ynez	Episode: "Bride of the Sun"
2002	Mutant X	Avaris	Episode: "Past as Prologue"
2003	Veritas: The Quest	Vanessa	Episode: "Mummy Virus"
2003	Threshold	Peg	TV film
2003	Sue Thomas: F.B.Eye	Connie	Episode: "Billy the Kid"
2003	Tarzan	Concerned Nurse	Episode: "The End of the Beginning"
2004	Wild Card	Sandra	Episode: "Candy Land"
2004	This Is Wonderland	Melanie Kagan	Episode: "1.7"
2004	Wonderfalls	Attractive Nurse	Episode: "Wax Lion"
2004	Kevin Hill	Evelyn Cruz	Recurring role
2007–2008	Da Kink in My Hair	Nikki	Recurring role
2008	Flashpoint	Sally LaFlamme	4 episodes (season 1)
2009	The Line	Maria	Episodes: 1.2, 1.3, 1.5
2009	The Listener	Det. Charlie Marks	Main role (season 1)
2010	Bones	Janet LeBlanc	Episode: "The Body and the Bounty"
2010	CSI: Miami	Vicki Turner	Episode: "Happy Birthday"
2013–2014	Played	Maria Cortez	Main role
2014	Hemlock Grove	Leticia Padilla	Recurring role
2015	Good Witch	Frankie	Episode: "Together We Stand"
2015	Lost Girl	Alicia Welles	Recurring role (season 5)
2016	Shadowhunters	Susanna Vargas	3 episodes (season 1)
2016	Rogue	Zipporah	Episodes: "3.12", "The Dime Tour"
2016	Halcyon	Jules Dover	Episodes: "1.1", "Untouched"
2018	On My Block	Julia Whitman	Recurring role
2019	The Rookie	Eva Ruiz	Episode: "Breaking Point"
2020	Designated Survivor	Senator Sanchez	Episode: "Grief"
