= The Guardian (TV series) =

American legal drama television series

- Season 2 intertitle
- Genre: Drama
- Created by: David Hollander
- Starring: Simon Baker; Dabney Coleman; Raphael Sbarge; Amanda Michalka; Alan Rosenberg; Erica Leerhsen; Wendy Moniz
- Opening theme: "Guardian Theme" (season 1) by Mark Snow; "Empire in My Mind" performed by The Wallflowers (seasons 2–3)
- Composers: Mark Snow; Jon Ehrlich
- Country of origin: United States
- Original language: English
- No. of seasons: 3
- No. of episodes: 67 (list of episodes)

Production
- Executive producers: David Hollander; Mark Johnson; Michael Pressman
- Producers: Alfonso H. Moreno; Peter Parnell; Jim Michaels; Simon Baker
- Cinematography: James R. Bagdonas; Jacek Laskus
- Editors: James Coblentz; Lori Jane Coleman; Gib Jaffe; Michael N. Knue; Chad Mochrie; Robert P. Seppey; Lynne Willingham
- Running time: 44 minutes
- Production companies: David Hollander Productions; Gran Via Productions; CBS Productions; Sony Pictures Television (Note: Credited as Columbia TriStar Television (2001; season 1) and Columbia TriStar Domestic Television (2001–2002; seasons 1–2).)

Original release
- Network: CBS
- Release: September 25, 2001 – May 4, 2004

The Guardian is an American drama television series created by David Hollander, which originally aired on CBS from September 25, 2001, to May 4, 2004. The show stars Simon Baker as Pittsburgh corporate attorney Nick Fallin, with his father Burton as his boss, portrayed by Dabney Coleman.

== Premise ==
When Nick is convicted of drug use, he is sentenced to 1,500 hours of community service as a guardian ad litem; the show focuses on this, his recovery from drug addiction, and his strained relationship with his father. It includes guest stars such as Farrah Fawcett, and featured scenes with the Pittsburgh Police in multiple episodes.

== Episodes ==
Season	Episodes	Originally released	
Season	Episodes	First released	Last released
1	22	September 25, 2001	May 21, 2002
2	23	September 24, 2002	May 13, 2003
3	22	September 23, 2003	May 4, 2004

== Cast and characters ==
=== Main ===
- Simon Baker, as Nicholas "Nick" Fallin, a lawyer sentenced to community service for drug-related crimes. The central protagonist, he is a driven individual whose work and relationships are the focus for the series.
- Dabney Coleman, as Burton Fallin, Nick's father and the senior partner at the law firm where Nick works. Another central protagonist, the two do not have a close relationship. Starting in season two, he fosters Shannon Gressler.
- Alan Rosenberg, as Alvin Masterson, the head of Legal Services of Pittsburgh, where Nick is doing his community service. Later in the series, Alvin dates Laurie Solt, a social worker.
- Wendy Moniz, as Louisa "Lulu" Archer, Nick's de facto boss from midseason one and his main love interest. She marries another man, but Nick cannot seem to move on, partially because she cannot seem to, either, even after her marriage.
- Raphael Sbarge, as Jake Straka, is Nick's closest friend and a law colleague.
- Charles Malik Whitfield, as James Mooney, is an attorney at Legal Services of Pittsburgh and a friend of Nick's. He has a gang and drug background (seasons 1–2).
- Erica Leerhsen, as Amanda Bowles, an ambitious but caring associate (first 13 episodes).

=== Recurring ===
- Rusty Schwimmer, as Barbara Ludinski, is the secretary for Legal Aid where Nick is doing his community service. Jake has an ongoing, but somewhat ambiguous relationship with her that teeters on the edge of becoming romantic. He likes and respects her, but he remains tentative (seasons 1–2).
- Kathleen Chalfant, as Laurie Solt, is a hardworking social worker who provides guidance for Nick.
- Denise Dowse, as Judge Rebecca Damsen, presides over the cases in family court.
- AJ Michalka (as Amanda Michalka), as Shannon Gressler, is a troubled child (seasons 2–3).

=== Notable guest stars ===
- Farrah Fawcett, as Mary Gressler, a troubled grandmother and love interest of Burton Fallin's. She appeared in four episodes in season two.
- Rita Moreno as Caroline Novak, is Lulu's mother (Louise Archer played by Wendy Moniz), for three episodes in 2003.
- Lolita Davidovich, as Victoria Little, is a social welfare advocate and a love interest of Alvin Masterson's. She appeared in two episodes.
- Zac Efron appears in episode 15 of season three.
- Bethany Joy Lenz, as Claire Stasiak, appeared in two episodes: "What It Means to You" and "My Aim Is True".
- Chris Pine, as a troubled teen, Lonnie Grandy, appeared in the season-three episode "Hazel Park".
- Will Ferrell, credited as "Phil Weston", made a cameo appearance as Larry Flood, a new lawyer at LSP, in the season-two finale, "All the Rage".
- Corey Feldman appeared as a former child actor, Gavin Putinski, in season two's "You Belong to Me".
- Erik Estrada made a cameo appearance in a restaurant in season three, episode 18, "The Bachelor Party".
- Joseph Campanella as Ralph Longo, is the sick grandfather evicted from the home in which he had squatted for 21 years, in the season-three episode 9, "Let God Sort 'Em Out".
- Aaron Paul portrays a gay teenager in the season-one episode "The Men from the Boys".
- Chloë Grace Moretz, as Violet, appears in the season-three episodes "The Watchers" and "Blood in, Blood Out". This was her first acting role.
- Danielle Panabaker, as Samantha Gray, appears in the season-three episode "The Daughter-Father Dance", for which she won a Young Artist Award for Best Performance in a TV Series—Guest Starring Young Actress.
- Anna Gunn, as Meghan Barstow, is a lawyer for a pharmaceutical firm in season-one episodes "Home" and "Reunion".
- Viola Davis portrays Suzanna Clemons' attorney in the season-one episode "The Men from the Boys".
- Kerry Washington. as Drea Westbrook, is a client in the season-two episode "The Next Life".
- Jesse Plemons, as Lawrence Neal, portrays a disabled child in the season-one episode "Paternity".
- Lee Thompson Young, as Levi Mooney, is James' nephew over whom he briefly has custody.
- Andrew Lawrence, as Ronnie Wagner, is a 13-year-old accused of killing his adoptive mother in season two, episode two, "Monster".

== Production and location ==
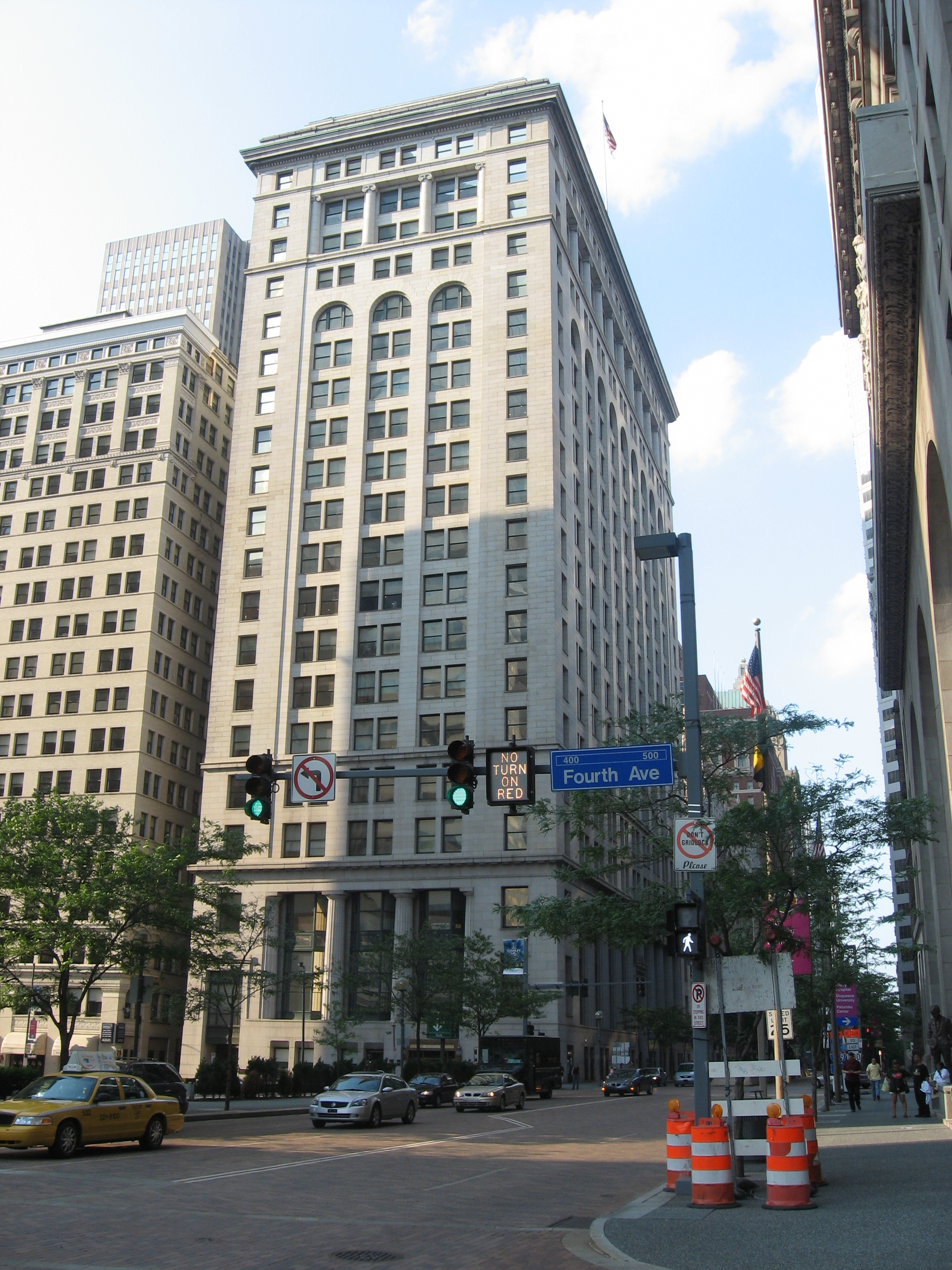
The Frick Building, fictional offices of Fallin & Fallin

The show was set in Pittsburgh, Pennsylvania, and was filmed in the city from time to time. Beginning in season two, the theme song was "Empire in My Mind" performed by The Wallflowers. The fictional offices of Legal Services of Pittsburgh are located at 121–123 Seventh Street, Pittsburgh, while Fallin and Fallin's offices are located in the Frick Building, 437 Grant Street, Pittsburgh.

== International broadcast ==
=== Latin America ===
In Latin America, the series premiered sometime between 2002 and 2011; the Sony Spin channel — one of the channels on which the series aired there — showed the series from October 2012 until 2013/2014.

=== Europe ===
==== UK ====
In the UK, the series aired on the Hallmark Channel for at most three years before moving to ABC1 from April 2006 until around 2007. It also aired on 5USA from May 2009 until the 2010s; Five first aired the series in August 2009.

=== Asia ===
==== India and Pakistan ====
In India and Pakistan, the series aired on Animax from June 2010 until around 2012. It also aired on FX in the mid-2010s and on AXN until 2019.

==== Singapore ====
In Singapore, the series airs on AXN (through Starhub Cable Television) for at most two decades as of 2025.

==== Turkey ====
In Turkey, the series aired on TNT from 2008/2009 until 2011/2012.

=== Australasia ===
==== Australia ====
In Australia, the series first aired on Foxtel's defunct station TV1 (now TVH!TS) in 2003 (during the Saturday Night's Crime Time Block before Law & Order: Criminal Intent and Law & Order: SVU). It also premiered in the mid-to-late 2000s on Network Ten, and has also aired in reruns on the Nine Network since the 2010s.

==== New Zealand ====
In New Zealand, the series aired on Vibe (channel 7) via Sky TV.

== Streaming ==
As of 2025, the series is available on Paramount+.

== Home media ==
CBS DVD (distributed by Paramount Home Entertainment) has released all three seasons of The Guardian on DVD in region 1.

On February 6, 2018, CBS Home Entertainment released The Guardian: The Complete Series on DVD in region 1.

DVD name	Ep#	Release date
The First Season	22	October 27, 2009
The Second Season	23	September 7, 2010
The Final Season	22	February 8, 2011
The Complete Series	67	February 6, 2018

CBS/Paramount controls video rights only in the USA (where CBS Television Distribution has ancillary rights). Outside the US, Sony Pictures Television controls distribution rights, and international DVD releases will be mostly from Sony Pictures Home Entertainment.

In Germany, Koch Media has released the first two seasons on DVD and Blu-ray.

== Awards ==
Year	Award	Category	Result
2002	ASCAP Film and Television Music Awards	"Top TV Series" – Jakob Dylan	Won
2002	Family Television Awards	"Actor" – Simon Baker"	Won
2002	Family Television Awards	"New Series"	Won
2002	GLAAD Media Awards	"Outstanding Individual Episode (In a Series Without a Regular Gay Character)" – "The Men from the Boys"	Nominated
2002	Golden Globe Award	"Best Performance by an Actor in a Television Series - Drama" – Simon Baker	Nominated
2002	Young Artist Award	"Best Performance in a TV Drama Series - Guest Starring Young Actor" – Erik Knudsen	Nominated
2002	Young Artist Award	"Best Performance in a TV Drama Series - Guest Starring Young Actor" – Jesse Plemons	Nominated
2003	ASCAP Film and Television Music Awards	"Top TV Series" – Jakob Dylan	Won
2003	Emmy Award	"Outstanding Guest Actress in a Drama Series" – Farrah Fawcett	Nominated
2003	Environmental Media Awards	"Drama - TV Episodic" – "Assuming the Position"	Nominated
2004	ASCAP Film and Television Music Awards	"Top TV Series" – Jakob Dylan	Won
2004	Environmental Media Awards	"Drama - TV Episodic" – "Big Coal"	Nominated
2004	Young Artist Award	"Best Performance in a TV Series - Guest Starring Young Actress" – Danielle Panabaker	Won
2005	Prism Awards	"Performance in a Drama Series Storyline" – Simon Baker	Nominated
2005	Prism Awards	"TV Drama Series Multi-Episode Storyline" – "Beautiful Blue Mystic" and "Amends"	Nominated
2005	Young Artist Award	"Best Performance in a Television Series - Recurring Young Actress" – Scout Taylor-Compton	Nominated
