= Replica Redux =

Replica Redux is a 2012 extended version of the cult copy-store comedy Replica, directed by Raymond Scott Daigle, which was originally released in 2008. Unlike the myriad festival cuts of the film, Replica Redux is nearly twice the running time at nearly 30 minutes.

The movie adds 16 minutes of all-new material, and represents a significant re-edit of the original which follows the night-in-the-lives of several "graveyard-shift workers at a Kinko's-type copy shop". The film stars Daedalus Howell as a beleaguered nightshift manager whose life collapses in the course of several hours, and Josh Staples, whose character is largely responsible for the mayhem. The film was photographed by Abe Levy, after hours, in a Fed-Ex Kinkos without corporate knowledge. Daigle released Replica Redux on YouTube in 2012.
