= One of Our Own (2007 film) =

- Release poster
- Directed by: Abe Levy
- Written by: Abe Levy; Silver Tree
- Produced by: Terry Chase Chenowith; Jack Robinson; Silver Tree
- Starring: Matthew Lillard; Josh Randall; Claire Rankin; Kate Beahan
- Cinematography: Brandon Trost
- Edited by: Abe Levy
- Music by: Eric Holland
- Production companies: Colorfast Pictures; Wild Horse Productions
- Release date: June 15, 2007 (Seattle International Film Festival)
- Country: United States
- Language: English

One of Our Own is a 2007 independent drama film directed by Abe Levy.

== Plot ==
A married couple, Stellan (Josh Randall) and Diane (Claire Rankin), enlist a surrogate named Cathy (Kate Beahan), to bear their child. The situation is complicated when Stellan's boss Bob (Matthew Lillard) falls in love with Cathy.

== Cast ==
- Josh Randall as Stellan
- Claire Rankin as Diane
- Kate Beahan as Cathy
- Matthew Lillard as Bob

== Reception ==
One of Our Own did not receive a commercial release in the United States after financial backers insisted on edits that director Abe Levy and star Matthew Lillard found unacceptable; an unaltered cut instead screened at film festivals in 2007 and 2008. In Australia, Flashback Entertainment issued the film on DVD.

Ken Eisner of Variety compared the film to Who's Afraid of Virginia Woolf?, writing:

Bolstered by a smart script and razor-sharp perfs, this impressively taut adult drama reps an edgy yet amusing look at middle-class fertility rites. Presence of funnyman Matthew Lillard in a harder, change-of-pace role could help get this gem to the right thirtysomething auds.
