= Halcyon (TV series) =

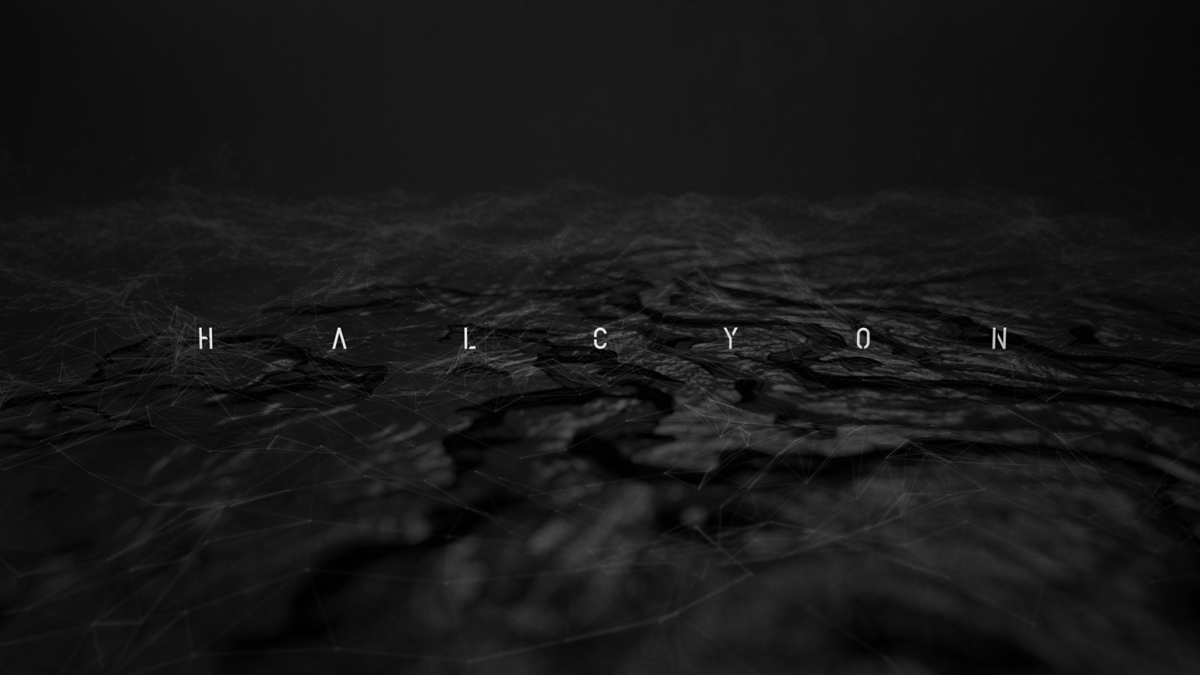
- The Scene Is Virtual. The Crime Is Real.
- Genre: Science fiction; Cyberpunk; Crime drama
- Created by: Stefan Grambart
- Written by: Mike Heneghan
- Directed by: Benjamin Arfmann
- Creative director: Stefan Grambart
- Starring: Lisa Marcos; Harveen Sandhu; Cody Ray Thompson; Victor Ertmanis; Andrew di Rosa; Michael Therriault; Claire Rankin; Jason Jazrawy
- Composers: Lodewijk Vos; Joseph Murray
- Country of origin: Canada
- Original language: English
- No. of seasons: 1
- No. of episodes: 10 (Linear); 5 (Interactive)

Production
- Executive producers: James Milward; Noora Abu Eitah; Eric Shamlin
- Producers: Sabrina Saccoccio; Michala Duffield; Chris Bennett
- Production locations: Toronto, Ontario, Canada
- Camera setup: Single
- Production company: Secret Location

Original release
- Network: Syfy
- Release: September 22, 2016

Halcyon is a science fiction television series that debuted September 2016 on the Syfy network. The show was billed as a "virtual reality series", consisting of both traditional televised content and 3D/VR media which could be experienced on devices such as the Oculus Rift and Gear VR. The series was produced by production company Secret Location and directed by Benjamin Arfmann. The show ran for 15 episodes, including ten "short form" traditional digital broadcasts, and an additional five episodes of interactive virtual reality. The show stars Lisa Marcos as Jules Dover, a detective using a VI implant to solve murders.

== Plot ==
The series takes place at a Virtual Reality company in 2058, called Halcyon, but will be a crime/murder mystery drama, with character Jules Dover (Lisa Marcos) as the detective of a "VR Crimes Unit".

While there have been virtual reality "shows" that were simply shot in 360° and/or 3D, Halcyon is billed as actually including interaction between the user and "clues" for each murder mystery.

== Characters ==
- Jules Dover (Lisa Marcos) is a highly capable homicide detective fully committed to her work—solving crimes that take place in the virtual world. She’s got some very real skeletons in her closet and is haunted by a painful past. Regardless, Jules is the kind of brass you assign to impossible cases because she has a knack for figuring out even the most twisted mysteries and solving the unsolvable. Where others fail, Jules Dover will succeed.
- Asha (Harveen Sandhu) is a Virtual Intelligence (VI), a fully functioning digital person with her own thoughts, feelings, and motivations. As Jules' assistant on cases, Asha is visible to anyone able to access VR through Halcyon's implant technology. Asha is a smart and valuable ally to Jules, yet she is hyper-aware of the limitations associated with being virtual, namely, that she is physically untouchable.
- Blake Creighton (Michael Therriault) knows how to take an idea and sensationalize, package and sell it to the public. He is the main driving force behind nanotechnology in VR being adopted on a global scale. Blake is a hero of the tech-world and force to be reckoned with, making it worldwide news when he's found dead in his apartment, with no apparent cause of death.
- Gavin Spencer (Victor Ertmanis) is the co-founder and former CEO of Halcyon. A brilliant technological philosopher, he is responsible for the advent of nanotechnology in VR, and his work has influenced the way people live their day-to-day lives. Once a vocal advocate for virtual life, Gavin has since disappeared, and not even his former confidants know where or how to find him.
- Alan (Cody Ray Thompson) is Blake Creighton’s Virtual Intelligence (VI) assistant. He's highly intelligent, servile, and accommodating; in fact, he’s a model virtual citizen and many wish other VIs would follow his lead. Having been so close to Halcyon's co-founder and CEO since the company’s infancy, Alan understands the inner workings of the multinational corporation like no one else.
- Miranda Reyes (Claire Rankin) is the Halcyon executive who replaces Blake Creighton as CEO following his unexpected death. Miranda is a driven and high-performing career woman whose focus is always on the bottom line. She believes passionately in the power of Halcyon technology in the new virtual world. Miranda also believes that to preserve the greater order of things, VIs must understand their place.
- Dylan Higgins (Andrew di Rosa) is a Halcyon technician with some questionable ties to the anti-VR Humanist movement. An expert in Halcyon nanotech software, Dylan has helped to develop some of the company's most popular products. He recognises the profound benefits of VR, but is also all too familiar with the consequences when the line between VR and the real world becomes blurred.

== Episodes ==
No.	Title	Original release date
1	"Untouched"	September 22, 2016
The founder of the Halcyon virtual reality company has disappeared. It is thought that he was killed by a VR intelligence, his virtual assistant. The first VR Crimes Unit is tasked with investigating.
2	"Long Distance"	September 22, 2016
Jules and Asha grill Halcyon’s acting CEO, Miranda Reyes, during an interrogation with her virtual avatar.
3	"Safe as Houses"	September 22, 2016
Virtual evidence leads to the questioning of a Halcyon employee who may hold key information on the crime.
4	"Hand That Feeds"	September 22, 2016
The prime suspect has some unfortunate associations, but are his ties enough to prove motive?
5	"Home invasion"	September 22, 2016
As Asha investigates a gap in the timeline of the crime and another VI raises suspicions.
6	"Human Movements"	September 22, 2016
Jules and Asha intercept an intruder tampering with the network at Creighton's apartment.
7	"Hand of God"	September 22, 2016
Jules and Asha question Gavin Spencer on the reason for his departure from Halcyon.
8	"Connected"	September 22, 2016
Jules reveals a personal loss to Asha, and uncovers a useful clue in the process.
9	"Closure"	September 22, 2016
Miranda returns from her trip, walking right into a dangerous trap.
10	"A Better Tomorrow"	September 22, 2016
A deadly standoff between the detectives and the killer forces Jules towards a life-changing decision.
