= List of The Guardian episodes =

This is a list of the 67 episodes for The Guardian, an American drama series which aired on CBS from September 25, 2001 to May 4, 2004. The series revolved around Nick Fallin, a corporate attorney sentenced to 1500 hours community service with Legal Services of Pittsburgh as the result of a drug conviction. The plot focused on Nick's community service and recovery from drug addiction, as well as his strained relationship with his father who was president of the corporate law firm where Nick was employed full-time.

== Series overview ==
Season	Episodes	Originally released	
Season	Episodes	First released	Last released
1	22	September 25, 2001	May 21, 2002
2	23	September 24, 2002	May 13, 2003
3	22	September 23, 2003	May 4, 2004

== Episodes ==
=== Season 1 (2001–02) ===
No. overall	No. in season	Title	Directed by	Written by	Original release date	Prod. code
1	1	"Pilot"	Michael Pressman	David Hollander & Elisa Bell	September 25, 2001	100
2	2	"Reunion"	Michael Pressman	David Hollander	October 2, 2001	102
3	3	"Paternity"	Joan Tewkesbury	Michael R. Perry	October 9, 2001	104
4	4	"Lolita?"	Charles Haid	David Hollander	October 16, 2001	101
5	5	"The Men from the Boys"	Peter Levin	Peter Parnell	October 23, 2001	103
6	6	"Indian Summer"	Lou Antonio	David Hollander	October 30, 2001	105
7	7	"Feeding Frenzy"	Peter Medak	Alfonso H. Moreno	November 6, 2001	106
8	8	"Heart"	Jeremy Kagan	David Hollander	November 20, 2001	107
9	9	"The Funnies"	Lou Antonio	Peter Parnell & Michael R. Perry	November 27, 2001	108
10	10	"Loyalties"	Arvin Brown	David Hollander	December 11, 2001	109
11	11	"Home"	Oz Scott	David Hollander & Alfonso H. Moreno	December 18, 2001	110
12	12	"Causality"	Jeremy Kagan	David Hollander & Peter Parnell	January 8, 2002	111
13	13	"Privilege"	Graeme Clifford	Michael R. Perry & David Hollander	January 22, 2002	112
14	14	"Family"	Andy Wolk	Rick Eid & Alfonso H. Moreno	February 5, 2002	113
15	15	"In Loco Parentis"	Michael Pressman	David Hollander	February 26, 2002	114
16	16	"Solidarity"	Lou Antonio	Michael R. Perry & David Hollander	March 5, 2002	115
17	17	"The Divide"	Alan Myerson	Rick Eid & Alfonso H. Moreno & David Hollander	March 12, 2002	116
18	18	"Mothers of the Disappeared"	Steven Robman	David Hollander & Michael R. Perry	March 26, 2002	117
19	19	"Lawyers, Guns & Money"	Jerry Levine	Rick Eid & Michael R. Perry & David Hollander	April 9, 2002	118
20	20	"Shelter"	Steve Gomer	Michael R. Perry & Rick Eid & David Hollander	May 7, 2002	119
21	21	"The Chinese Wall"	Joan Tewkesbury	Peter Parnell & Alfonso H. Moreno & David Hollander	May 14, 2002	120
22	22	"The Beginning"	Michael Pressman	David Hollander & Anne McGrail	May 21, 2002	121

=== Season 2 (2002–03) ===
No. overall	No. in season	Title	Directed by	Written by	Original release date	Prod. code
23	1	"Testimony"	Kevin Rodney Sullivan	David Hollander & Michael R. Perry	September 24, 2002	201
24	2	"Monster"	Steve Gomer	David Hollander & Anne McGrail	October 1, 2002	202
25	3	"The Dead"	Jerry Levine	Alfonso H. Moreno & David Hollander	October 8, 2002	203
26	4	"The Next Life"	Joan Tewkesbury	David Hollander & Rick Eid	October 15, 2002	204
27	5	"Assuming the Position"	Mel Damski	Nick Santora & David Hollander	October 22, 2002	205
28	6	"The Living"	Lee David Zlotoff	Rick Eid & David Hollander & Michael R. Perry	October 29, 2002	206
29	7	"The Innocent"	Juan J. Campanella	Anne McGrail	November 12, 2002	207
30	8	"The Neighborhood"	Jerry London	David Hollander & Tom Smuts	November 19, 2002	208
31	9	"The Dark"	Mel Damski	David Hollander & Nick Santora	November 26, 2002	209
32	10	"Sacrifice"	Michael Watkins	Rick Eid	December 10, 2002	210
33	11	"No Good Deed"	Lou Antonio	David Hollander & Nick Santora	December 17, 2002	211
34	12	"You Belong to Me"	Jessica Yu	Alfonso H. Moreno	January 7, 2003	212
35	13	"Ambition"	Duane Clark	Anne McGrail	January 21, 2003	213
36	14	"Understand Your Man"	John Patterson	David Hollander & Rick Eid	February 4, 2003	214
37	15	"Where You Are"	Vahan Moosekian	Michael R. Perry	February 11, 2003	215
38	16	"The Weight"	Steve Gomer	David Hollander & Tom Smuts	February 18, 2003	216
39	17	"The Intersection"	Peter Medak	David Hollander & Nick Santora & Tom Smuts	February 25, 2003	217
40	18	"My Aim Is True"	Simon Baker	Gayley Buckner & Rick Eid & David Hollander	March 18, 2003	218
41	19	"Back in the Ring"	Jeremy Kagan	Anne McGrail	April 1, 2003	219
42	20	"What It Means to You"	Jerry London	David Hollander & Rick Eid	April 22, 2003	220
43	21	"Burton & Ernie"	Martha Mitchell	Michael R. Perry & David Hollander	April 29, 2003	221
44	22	"Sensitive Jackals"	Joan Tewkesbury	David Hollander & Nick Santora	May 6, 2003	222
45	23	"All the Rage"	David Hollander	David Hollander & Rick Eid	May 13, 2003	223

=== Season 3 (2003–04) ===
No. overall	No. in season	Title	Directed by	Written by	Original release date	Prod. code
46	1	"Carnival"	Félix Alcalá	David Hollander & Rick Eid	September 23, 2003	301
47	2	"Big Coal"	Mel Damski	David Hollander & Nick Santora	September 30, 2003	302
48	3	"The Line"	Joan Tewkesbury	Barry M. Schkolnick	October 7, 2003	303
49	4	"The Daughter-Father Dance"	Steve Gomer	David Hollander & Jennifer Johnson	October 14, 2003	304
50	5	"Shame"	John Heath	David Hollander & Rick Eid	October 21, 2003	305
51	6	"Let's Spend the Night Together"	Michael Zinberg	Rick Eid	October 28, 2003	306
52	7	"Hazel Park"	Emilio Estevez	David Hollander & Tom Smuts	November 4, 2003	307
53	8	"Believe"	Peter Medak	David Hollander & Jennifer Johnson	November 11, 2003	308
54	9	"Let God Sort 'Em Out"	Félix Alcalá	Nick Santora	November 25, 2003	309
55	10	"Swimming"	James Bagdonas	David Hollander & Rick Eid	December 16, 2003	310
56	11	"Legacy"	Nancy Malone	David Hollander & Rick Eid	January 6, 2004	311
57	12	"Beautiful Blue Mystic"	Mel Damski	David Hollander	January 13, 2004	312
58	13	"Amends"	Bill L. Norton	David Hollander & Jennifer Johnson	January 27, 2004	313
59	14	"All Is Mended"	Emilio Estevez	David Hollander & Tom Smuts	February 10, 2004	314
60	15	"Without Consent"	Vahan Moosekian	Rick Eid	February 17, 2004	315
61	16	"Sparkle"	Steve Gomer	David Hollander & Barry M. Schkolnick	February 24, 2004	316
62	17	"The Watchers"	Emilio Estevez	David Hollander & Nick Santora	March 2, 2004	317
63	18	"The Bachelor Party"	Alan Rosenberg	David Hollander & Rick Eid	March 9, 2004	318
64	19	"Remember"	Bill L. Norton	David Hollander & Tom Smuts	April 6, 2004	319
65	20	"The Vote"	Mel Damski	Jennifer Johnson & Rick Eid	April 20, 2004	320
66	21	"Blood In, Blood Out"	Joan Tewkesbury	David Hollander & Nick Santora	April 27, 2004	321
67	22	"Antarctica"	David Hollander	David Hollander & Rick Eid	May 4, 2004	322

== Home video releases ==
Season	Episodes	DVD release dates			
Season	Episodes	Region 1	Region 2	Region 4	Discs
1	22	October 27, 2009	TBA	TBA	6
2	23	September 7, 2010	TBA	TBA	6
3	22	February 8, 2011	TBA	TBA	6
