= The Aviary (2005 film) =

2005 film by Silver Tree and Abe Levy

- Directed by: Abe Levy
- Written by: Silver Tree; Abe Levy
- Produced by: Silver Tree; Abe Levy
- Starring: Lara Phillips; Josh Randall; Michael Gilio; Claire Rankin
- Distributed by: The Fancy Films
- Release date: June 14, 2005
- Running time: 85 minutes
- Country: United States
- Language: English

The Aviary is a 2005 independent film about the ups and downs in the personal life of a flight attendant, coping with a transfer to a new city, finding a new love, and everything in between. It was written and produced by Abe Levy and Silver Tree, who was a flight attendant herself for many years. The film stars Lara Phillips, Josh Randall, Michael Gilio, and Claire Rankin.

== Plot ==
Summer Pozzi, a Chicago-based flight attendant for an unnamed airline, is mentally preparing to quit her job and marry Jim, her soon-to-be airline pilot boyfriend. During a layover, she gets a phone call asking her to transfer to San Francisco. Then, Jim tells her he refused to take a final exam to be a pilot, unable to have the lives of many passengers on his shoulders. Shaken and disappointed, Summer decides to go ahead with the transfer, and promises herself not to fall for another man too quickly.

Once in San Francisco, she moves into a small apartment with three other flight attendants, one of them who was supposed to be moving out. There's Portia, a posh but insecure British girl undergoing an eternal makeover, Kate, who is very bitchy ever since Summer reprimanded her on a previous flight and Lucas, with whom Summer immediately has a one-night stand.

During a layover, she later meets Julian, the captain of her dreams. She is immediately in love. He is based in Hong Kong, and meeting him every week in New York City poses a challenge, which will come to an end very suddenly, as she realizes her actions cost one of her friends' job and maybe even someone else's life, and as she sees Julian as anything but the perfect man he once appeared to be.

== Cast ==
- Lara Phillips as Summer Pozzi
- Josh Randall as Captain Julian
- Michael Gilio as Lucas
- Claire Rankin as Kate Sawyer
- Rachel Luttrell as Portia
