= Claire Rankin =

Canadian actress (born 1974)

- Born: January 23, 1971 (age 55); Prince Edward Island, Canada
- Occupation: Actress
- Years active: 1994–present
- Spouse: Josh Randall (m. 2000; div. 2013)

Claire Rankin (born January 23, 1971) is a Canadian actress.

== Career ==
In the 1990s, Rankin performed in Shakespeare's plays Love's Labour's Lost, Romeo and Juliet and The Tempest.

Rankin has appeared in over 50 films and television shows, including guest star roles on Hemlock Grove, The Mentalist, House, Monk, Without a Trace, The District, Chicago Hope, Ally McBeal and The Drew Carey Show. She has also had lead roles in independent films and television movies such as Molly's Game, Seven in Heaven and One of Our Own.

While training with the Stratford Festival Young Company, she spent four years with the Stratford Shakespearean Festival playing classical roles, such as Miranda in The Tempest. She has also danced the ballet role of Louise in Carousel at the same festival. Other stage appearances include Cosette in Les Misérables and Juliet in Romeo and Juliet.

She is known for starring as Mary in Son of a Critch, and for her recurring roles including Kate Heightmeyer in Stargate Atlantis and Fleur de Brabant in the supernatural fantasy Forever Knight. She has also guest-starred in The Outer Limits, Sleepwalkers, Charmed and Star Trek: Voyager.

In 2019, Rankin originated the role of Cynthia Murphy in the first International Production of Dear Evan Hansen in Toronto. She continued in the role in the show's tour of North America.

== Personal life ==
Rankin was married to actor Josh Randall from 2000 to 2013.

== Filmography ==
Film roles
Year	Title	Role	Notes
1994	Death Wish V: The Face of Death	Maxine	
1996	Waiting for Michelangelo	Beth	
1996	Two If by Sea	Reporter	
1998	In Quiet Night	Joey Amos	
2002	John Q	Public Defender	
2005	The Aviary	Kate Sawyer	
2007	One of Our Own	Diane	
2017	Molly's Game	Mother	
2018	Seven in Heaven	Mrs. Brenner	

Television roles
Year	Title	Role	Notes
1994	Picture Windows	Marie	TV series
1994	Janek: The Silent Betrayal	Beth	TV movie
1995	Forever Knight	Fleur	Episode: "Be My Valentine"
1995–1996	Side Effects	Erica Ouimette	Episodes: "Sixth Sense", "Goin' Down the Roadie"
1996	Dinner Along the Amazon	Audrey	TV short
1996	A Brother's Promise: The Dan Jansen Story	Robin Jansen	TV movie
1996	Ed McBain's 87th Precinct: Ice	Rita Gillette	TV movie
1996	Escape Clause	Janet	TV movie
1996	Undue Influence	Cindy	TV movie
1996	Kung Fu: The Legend Continues	Susan	Episode: "Storm Warning"
1998	Emily of New Moon	Juliet Starr	Episodes: "Eye of Heaven", "Storms of the Heart"
1998	Sleepwalkers	Rebecca	Episode: "Cassandra"
1998	Chicago Hope	Holly	Episode: "McNeil and Pray"
1998	The Outer Limits	Ariel	Episode: "Lithia"
1998–1999	Any Day Now	Sister Mary Margaret	Episodes: "Salamanders", "It's About the Heart"
1999	Diagnosis Murder	Kathleen Wolverton	Episode: "Trapped in Paradise"
1999	A Face to Kill for	Julia	TV movie
1999	Star Trek: Voyager	Alice	Episode: "Alice"
2000	The Drew Carey Show	Wendy Matson	Episode: "I Dishonestly Love You"
2000	The Outer Limits	Kyra	Episode: "The Beholder"
2000	The Beach Boys: An American Family	Diane Rovell	TV movie
2000	Relic Hunter	Ophilia	Episode: "Affaire de Coeur"
2000	Ally McBeal	Susan Hanks	Episode: "Do You Wanna Dance?"
2001	The District	Wendy Turner	Episode: "Thursday"
2003	Strong Medicine	Claire	Episode: "Temperatures Rising"
2003	Without a Trace	Doris Lovett	Episode: "Copy Cat"
2004	Charmed	Paula Marks	Episode: "Hyde School Reunion"
2005–2007	Stargate Atlantis	Dr. Kate Heightmeyer	5 episodes
2008	Vipers	Ellie Martin	TV movie
2009	Monk	Angeline Dilworth	Episode: "Mr. Monk and the Voodoo Curse"
2011	House	Elena	Episode: "You Must Remember This"
2012	The Mentalist	Greta Marshall	Episode: "So Long, and Thanks for All the Red Snapper"
2013	Nikita	Cheryl Dixon	Episode: "Bubble"
2016	Killing Mommy	Eve	TV movie
2016	The Swap	Summer	TV movie
2016	Halcyon	Miranda Reyes	TV series
2017	Ransom	Commander Nina Sellars	TV series
2022	Son of a Critch	Mary	TV series
