= Bradley King (filmmaker) =

American film director and screenwriter

- Born: Bradley Dean King; Los Alamos, New Mexico, U.S.
- Education: Art Institute of Colorado, Colorado Film School
- Occupations: Film director, screenwriter
- Years active: 2004–present

Bradley Dean King is an American film director and screenwriter. He made his directorial debut with Time Lapse (2014).

== Early life ==
King was raised in Los Alamos, New Mexico. He attended the Art Institute of Colorado and the Colorado Film School.

== Career ==
King began his career in 2004 when he wrote and directed Action Figures.

=== Films ===
- Time Lapse (2014)
- Requiem (2012)
- Drive Time (2011)
- Action Figures (2004)
