= Silver Tree =

American filmmaker

- Born: 1976 or 1977 (age 49–50); Petaluma, California
- Education: El Molino High School; Nonesuch School
- Alma mater: Santa Rosa Junior College; Sonoma State University
- Occupations: film script writer; film producer; television producer; television director
- Years active: 2004–present
- Known for: The Flight Attendant; You; Suits
- Spouse: Abraham Levy

Silver Tree (born 1976 or 1977) is an American television and film writer, producer, and director, from Petaluma, California.

== Early life ==
Silver Tree was born to Susan (née Fullam) and Scott Tree in Sonoma County, California, and raised in Petaluma.

Tree attended El Molino High School in Forestville, California and Nonesuch School in Sebastopol, California. She attended Santa Rosa Junior College and Sonoma State University where she majored in biochemistry.

== Career ==
Tree was an airline flight attendant based in San Francisco when she was involuntarily furloughed for six months in the wake of the September 11 attacks. During the furlough, she began co-writing with Abraham Levy the screenplay for The Aviary, a film about four flight attendants who live together in an apartment. Tree and Levy self-financed and distributed the $25,000 film.

== Personal life ==
Tree was one of the guests at Meghan Markle's wedding to Prince Harry at St George's Chapel, Windsor Castle on May 19, 2018.

== Filmography ==
=== Films ===
Year(s)	Title	Role	Notes
2005	The Aviary	Writer/producer	
2012	Deep Dark Canyon	Writer/director	

=== Television ===
Year(s)	Title	Role	Notes
2015–2016	Girlfriends' Guide to Divorce	Director	2 episodes
2016	The Real O'Neals	Director	2 episodes
2016	Bones	Director	1 episode
2018	Lethal Weapon	Director	1 episode
2014–2018	Suits	Director	10 episodes
2018–2020	Shameless	Director	4 episodes
2019–2021	You	Director, executive producer	8 episodes
2020–2022	Dead to Me	Director	3 episodes
2022	The Flight Attendant	Director	5 episodes
2023	Fatal Attraction	Director	5 episodes
2024	No Good Deed	Director	6 episodes
2025	The Pitt	Director	1 episode
2025	Suits LA	Director	1 episode
2026	Off Campus	Director	2 episodes
2026	The Altruists	Director	2 episodes
