= Franklin & Bash =

American legal comedy-drama television series

- Genre: Comedy drama; Legal procedural
- Created by: Kevin Falls; Bill Chais
- Starring: Breckin Meyer; Mark-Paul Gosselaar; Dana Davis; Kumail Nanjiani; Malcolm McDowell; Reed Diamond; Garcelle Beauvais; Heather Locklear; Toni Trucks; Anthony Ordonez
- Opening theme: "Mixture" performed by Pete
- Composers: John Robert Wood, Tree Adams
- Country of origin: United States
- Original language: English
- No. of seasons: 4
- No. of episodes: 40 (list of episodes)

Production
- Executive producers: Jamie Tarses; Kevin Falls; Bill Chais; Jason Ensler
- Producer: Dana Calvo
- Production locations: Los Angeles, California; Atlanta, Georgia (pilot only)
- Cinematography: Dennis S. Hall
- Editor: Joe Hobeck
- Camera setup: Single-camera
- Running time: 38 minutes
- Production companies: FanFare Productions; Four Sycamore Productions; Left Coast Productions; Sony Pictures Television

Original release
- Network: TNT
- Release: June 1, 2011 – October 22, 2014

Franklin & Bash is an American legal comedy drama television series created by Kevin Falls and Bill Chais. The series starred Breckin Meyer and Mark-Paul Gosselaar as unconventional lawyers and longtime friends. A Turner Broadcasting executive referred to the series as a "funny legal procedural", whereas in the United Kingdom it was referred to as "Ally McBeal with Balls" when advertised for its forthcoming debut on E4.

The series was broadcast in the United States on cable channel TNT. It premiered on June 1, 2011. The second season aired June 5, 2012, and the third on June 19, 2013. The show was renewed for a fourth season on October 17, 2013, which premiered August 13, 2014. On November 11, 2014, TNT canceled the series after four seasons.

== Overview ==
The characters Jared Franklin and Peter Bash, for whom the show is named, are an unlikely duo of streetwise attorneys. After defeating Damien Karp of the prestigious law firm Infeld & Daniels, LLC (colloquially "Infeld Daniels"), they are recruited by co-founder and managing partner Stanton Infeld to breathe new life into the ailing firm with the duo reminding Stanton of his early days with his partner, the late Daniels. Assisting Franklin and Bash is Carmen Phillips, an ex-convict out on parole who assists with background investigations on cases, and Pindar Singh, a brilliant, agoraphobic attorney and classmate of theirs.

In agreeing to work for Infeld Daniels, Franklin and Bash were guaranteed that they would still be taking on the same kind of cases as before, only with the backing of a major law firm. Over the course of their cases Franklin and Bash, through their courtroom antics, prove to be effective advocates for their clients, much to the chagrin of Damien Karp and his ex-girlfriend fellow attorney Hanna Linden. Unbeknownst to the titular duo, Karp and Linden have been clandestinely stockpiling files on the team in the hopes that enough infractions will motivate Infeld to fire them. However, after assisting Franklin & Bash in military court, Linden tried to delete the entire file, failing to hide the file from the NY firm partners.

The duo later learn their hiring was a move by Infeld to protect the firm from a leveraged buyout by any firm, particularly Franklin's father's firm (Franklin and Franklin). Although the pair feel manipulated, the team still work to save Infeld Daniels from the attempted takeover. Infeld arrives at their house offering his regrets about the lie.

In Season 3's "Coffee and Cream", the firm is renamed Infeld•Daniels•King LLC, with the hiring/buying in of Rachel King, a lawyer who had worked with Karp years ago and had recently humiliated Franklin and Bash on national television. Infeld hired her in hopes of restoring some of the corporate culture lost with the changes Franklin and Bash brought in with their own hiring.

In season 4, it is revealed that Rachel King fled to Croatia after embezzling money from clients and Stanton is believed to be her accomplice, leading to his suspension from the bar. He leaves Peter and Jared in charge, effectively making the firm Infeld•Daniels•Franklin•Bash LLC. Pindar and Carmen have left and are replaced by new lawyer Anita Haskins and Dan Mundy, a new investigator. Also joining the firm is Ellen Swatello, who has left the DA's office and taken a job with the firm to work with Stanton Infeld, becoming dismayed at learning of his disbarment and having to work for Peter and Jared.

== Cast and characters ==
=== Main ===
- Breckin Meyer as Elmo "Jared" Franklin, Duke of Landingshire, the snarky, self-confident party-boy son of a famous trial lawyer.
- Mark-Paul Gosselaar as Peter Bash, Franklin's best friend and legal partner, who is slightly more mature and level-headed than Franklin.
- Malcolm McDowell as Stanton Infeld, who is eccentric and yet easy-going. Stanton is a senior partner in the prominent law firm Infeld-Daniels. After witnessing their unconventional techniques in court, he hires Franklin and Bash due to their resemblance to him and a partner back in his early days of his law firm.
- Reed Diamond as Damien Karp, Stanton's staid but conniving nephew, former senior partner for Infeld Daniels, who is resentful of Franklin and Bash's good standing and quick success with his uncle.
- Dana Davis as Carmen Phillips (seasons 1–3), an ex-convict working for Franklin and Bash as their private personal investigator.
- Kumail Nanjiani as Pindar ("Pindy") Singh (seasons 1–3), an agoraphobic lawyer working for Franklin and Bash, who first met the duo during their law school days. Nanjiani left the show because of his new show Silicon Valley: "Yeah, I actually had to leave Franklin & Bash to do Silicon Valley, so you'll see in the new season that we figure out a way to hand it off to another character in a really funny way."
- Garcelle Beauvais as Hanna Linden (seasons 1–2), a senior partner working for Infeld Daniels, and Karp's ex-girlfriend who uses Franklin's affections to get back at Damien.
- Heather Locklear as Rachel Rose King (season 3), a trial lawyer who joins the firm as a newly named on-door law partner, causing it to be renamed Infeld•Daniels•King LLC.
- Toni Trucks as Anita Haskins (season 4), a smart, professional law school graduate who joins the firm for a chance to actually try cases as opposed to doing research.
- Anthony Ordonez as Dan Mundy (season 4), the firm's eccentric new investigator. He has a number of strange mannerisms, such as appearing out of nowhere and liberally interpreting Peter and Jared's requests. It is loosely implied that he has a military or intelligence background.

=== Recurring ===
- Claire Coffee as Janie Ross (seasons 1–2), an Assistant DA and Peter Bash's ex-girlfriend
- Beau Bridges as Elmo "Leonard" Franklin (seasons 1–2), Jared Franklin's father. Their family passes the name Elmo from father to son, though they adopt other names for everyday use.
- Alexandra Holden as Debbie Wilcox (season 1), an assistant to Franklin and Bash. Her absence from the series midway through season 1 onward is never explained.
- Rhea Seehorn as Ellen Swatello (seasons 1, 3–4), an assistant DA who is overshadowed by Janie Ross and dislikes Franklin & Bash.
- Kathy Najimy as Judge Alice Sturgess (season 1), who is no fan of the titular attorneys and has cited them for contempt of court.
- Gates McFadden as Judge Mallory Jacobs (season 1–4), a judge who dislikes the duo's antics
- Kat Foster as Wendy Cowell (seasons 2, 4), an LAPD officer who dated Bash
- Robert Wuhl as Judge Maxwell Nulis (season 2–4), a judge who admires the duo
- Nicky Whelan as "Charlie" Charlotte (season 3), beach house neighbor, kinesiologist and love interest for Bash
- Jane Seymour (season 2–4) as Colleen Bash, a sex surrogate and Peter Bash's mother
- Yuji Nagata (season 3) as himself, boyfriend of Colleen Bash

== Development and production ==
The series was originally in development for the TBS network. In February 2010, TBS placed a cast-contingent pilot order from a script written by Kevin Falls and Bill Chais. Casting announcements began in early March, with Meyer and Gosselaar taking starring roles as the title characters. Next to be cast was McDowell, as Stanton Infeld. Then, comedian Nanjiani was cast as Pindar Singh, followed by Diamond, as Damien Karp, and Beauvais and Davis as Hanna Linden and Carmen Phillips respectively.

The pilot was filmed in Atlanta in late March and early April. In May 2010, the show was moved from TBS to sister station TNT, where network executives believed it was a better fit. The network green-lit production in mid-May with a ten episode order, with production moving to Los Angeles.

== Reception ==
=== Critical reception ===
Franklin & Bash received mixed reviews from TV critics. On Metacritic, the show has a score of 56 out of 100, based on 21 critics, indicating "mixed or average reviews". On Rotten Tomatoes, the show holds a rating of 61%, based on 17 reviews, with an average rating of 6/10. The site's consensus reads, "Slick, playful, and occasionally witty, Franklin & Bash unfortunately sticks too close to the courtroom drama formula".

The Los Angeles Times described the pilot episode as "not as intrigue-heavy as White Collar, as satiric as The Good Guys or as beautifully located as Hawaii Five-0; 'Franklin & Bash' is smart, it's fun and it's summer." Variety gave a positive review, describing the show as "playful, silly and wholly unpretentious." The Hollywood Reporter also gave the pilot a positive review:

In the end, Franklin & Bash uses the legal genre to prop up what is mostly a buddy story. There may be bigger reveals ahead and certain daring complications, but no doubt Franklin and Bash will get out of them with their good looks and quick wits. That’s how they roll – mostly – on TNT.

=== Ratings ===
The pilot episode premiered with 2.7 million total viewers, scoring 1.1 million viewers in the 18–49 demographic and 1.2 million in the 25–54 demographic, making it the fourth most watched cable-program of the evening. Live + 3 day ratings for the series premiere updated those numbers to 3.5 million total viewers, scoring 1.5 million viewers in the 18–49 demographic, 1.6 million in the 25–54 demographic and 0.7 million in the 18–34 demographic.

Season	Season premiere			Season finale		
Season	Date	Viewers Total (in millions)	Viewers 18–49	Date	Viewers Total (in millions)	Viewers 18–49
1	June 1, 2011	2.74	1.14	August 3, 2011	2.54	0.8
2	June 5, 2012	3.07	0.9	August 14, 2012	2.82	0.9
3	June 19, 2013	1.97	0.6	August 14, 2013	2.17	0.6
4	August 13, 2014			October 22, 2014	TBA	TBA

== Home media ==
Sony Pictures Home Entertainment have released the first three seasons of Franklin & Bash in Region 1, and the first three seasons in Region 2. Mill Creek Entertainment released the complete series in Region 1.

DVD Name	Ep#	Release dates		
DVD Name	Ep#	Region 1	Region 2	Region 4
The Complete First Season	10	June 19, 2012	November 14, 2011	—N/a
The Complete Second Season	10	June 23, 2015	April 28, 2014	—N/a
The Complete Third Season	10	September 1, 2015	November 3, 2014	—N/a
The Complete Series	40	November 17, 2020	—N/a	—N/a

== Broadcast ==
Franklin & Bash premiered in Canada on Bravo! on August 22, 2011. For the fourth season, the show was moved to M3. In the UK the show premiered on July 13, 2011 on E4. On November 8, 2011 it began showing on M-Net in South Africa. In Australia it premiered on FX on June 6, 2012.
