= Galaxy (character) =

Fictional transgender superhero

Publication information
- Publisher: DC Comics
- First appearance: Galaxy: The Prettiest Star (2022)
- Created by: Jadzia Axelrod; Vash Taylor

In-story information
- Alter ego: Taylor Barzelay; Taelyr Ilextrix-spiir Biarxiiai (birth name)
- Species: Cyandii
- Place of origin: Cyandii
- Team affiliations: Justice League
- Partnerships: Dreamer; Hawkgirl
- Abilities: Energy manipulation Flight; Enhanced strength

Galaxy is a superhero who appears in American comic books published by DC Comics. The character was created by writer Jadzia Axelrod and artist Vash Taylor for the 2022 young adult graphic novel Galaxy: The Prettiest Star, published by DC under the company's Graphic Novels for Young Adults imprint. Galaxy was folded into DC Universe continuity soon after and established as a close friend and confidant of Dreamer. In 2026, Axelrod and artist Rye Hickman's Galaxy: As the World Falls Down, a direct sequel to The Prettiest Star, made Galaxy the first transgender character at either DC or Marvel Comics to headline her own series.

In the DC Universe, Galaxy (born Taelyr Ilextrix-spiir Biarxiiai) is an alien princess and one of the only survivors of a genocide that devastated her homeworld of Cyandii, after which she fled to Earth and was disguised as a human boy under the name Taylor Barzelay. When she is sixteen years old, she comes out as both an alien and a transgender lesbian, later becoming a superhero and joining the Justice League in adulthood.

== Publication history ==
Galaxy first appeared in the graphic novel Galaxy: The Prettiest Star by writer Jadzia Axelrod and artist Vash Taylor, published on May 17, 2022 (with a preview released one week prior on Free Comic Book Day). Axelrod had pitched Galaxy to DC Comics years previously along with several other story ideas, but did not believe DC would be interested as the company was not looking for original characters at the time. However, her pitch was successful, and DC eventually greenlit a full graphic novel starring Galaxy and brought Taylor on as artist. Axelrod and Taylor both cited the music and fashion of David Bowie as major influences while developing The Prettiest Star; the novel's title comes from the Bowie song of the same name, and Bowie allusions appear frequently throughout, including as chapter titles. Axelrod also drew on her own teenage experiences with repressing her gender identity. The Prettiest Star sold well, entering its third printing less than two years after publication. The novel did not make specific references to Galaxy's assigned sex at birth, but Axelrod clarified that the character was assigned male in later appearances after some readers mistakenly believed she was cisgender.

In 2023, Galaxy appeared in a Hawkgirl miniseries written by Axelrod, this time as an adult beginning her superhero career in earnest. According to Axelrod, she realized she had written a "Galaxy-shaped hole in the plot" for the series and needed a character with Galaxy's powers to resolve the story. Thanks to the commercial success of The Prettiest Star, DC editors approved Galaxy's use in Hawkgirl, formally establishing the character within the main fictional continuity of the DC Universe. Galaxy then featured in the 2024 graphic novel Bad Dream: A Dreamer Story by writer Nicole Maines and artist Rye Hickman, the DC Universe origin story of Dreamer. Maines collaborated with Axelrod to incorporate a teenage Galaxy into the novel, joining the two characters' in-universe histories.

Galaxy appeared as a member of the Justice League in the 2025 one-shot DC's I Saw Ma Hunkel Kissing Santa Claus, which also introduced her supervillain ex-girlfriend Stella Scarborough, a.k.a. Still. She next co-starred with Dreamer in the Justice League Intergalactic Special one-shot, written by Axelrod and Maines and released on April 29, 2026. Axelrod and Hickman's Galaxy: As the World Falls Down, a direct sequel to The Prettiest Star, was published the next week on May 5, 2026, establishing Galaxy as the first transgender character from either DC or Marvel Comics to star in a series bearing her name. Galaxy and Dreamer then starred in Justice League: Dream Girls, a four-issue DC Pride miniseries released weekly in June 2026 and set immediately after the events of the Intergalactic Special.

== Fictional character biography ==
=== Early life ===
Taelyr Ilextrix-spiir Biarxiiai is introduced in Galaxy: The Prettiest Star as a princess from the planet Cyandii and the first of her people to be born in space, giving her the title "The Galaxy-Crowned". Although Taelyr was raised as a boy for the first few years of her life, she told her parents at five years old that she was a girl, and they accepted her as their daughter. Taelyr also possesses a mysterious jewel in her chest which her parents once told her would protect her. Prior to the events of the first novel, when Taelyr was 10, nearly all the inhabitants of Cyandii — including her parents — were slaughtered in an invasion by the Vane, an insectoid hive mind with mind control abilities. A Cyandii general named Phii escaped with Taelyr and two other children to Earth, where he used a device called an Ehsar to change them into "normal" humans in order to escape Vane detection (using TV dramas about white families as his basis for human normality). As a result, Taelyr was effectively forced to detransition and live in a male human body under the name Taylor Barzelay. Phii poses as Taylor's strict father Phil, while the other two children take the roles of Taylor's older brother Carl and younger sister Sally. Taylor is also protected (and surveilled) by a robotic bodyguard named Argus, who resembles a corgi.

As Taylor grows up in the fictional Appalachian town of Ozma Gap, repressing her grief and identity further traumatizes her over time, and she experiences panic attacks and flashes of violent anger. Sneaking away on her 16th birthday to stargaze, Taylor meets Katherine "Kat" Silverberg, a Black cisgender girl who recently moved to Ozma from Metropolis. The two quickly become friends, heightening tensions with Carl and Phil. Taylor steals the Ehsar and takes it to her usual stargazing perch, where she finds Kat. They are about to kiss when Kat tells Taylor she's not interested in boys; Taylor replies that she is not a boy, touches the Ehsar, and suddenly transforms back into a Cyandii. Shocked and ashamed, Taylor flees and becomes human again, but is unable to resist using the Ehsar for long. She returns to Cyandiian form whenever she is alone with Kat, sharing her history and memories of her homeworld (while going to increasingly desperate lengths to avoid detection by Argus), and the two begin dating. Argus discovers Taylor's theft of the Ehsar and confronts her; furious, Taylor grabs the device and accidentally breaks it due to her newfound strength. She admits what she has done to Phil and Carl, who are furious, as the Ehsar cannot be repaired and Taylor is now exposed to the Vane. Soon, she faces overt discrimination: Taylor falls out with her best friend Buck, who hates aliens, and experiences transphobia from other classmates while using the bathroom. She plans to attend the homecoming dance with Kat, but is expelled from school days beforehand and becomes deeply depressed. On the night of the dance, Taylor returns to her perch and contemplates suicide, but eventually decides to defy her principal and attend the dance anyway. Phil once again attempts to force Taylor back into hiding, but relents after Carl unexpectedly speaks up on her behalf. Locked out of homecoming, Taylor and Kat dance together in the sky over their school instead. Kat suggests that Taylor use "Galaxy" as her superhero name.

In Bad Dream: A Dreamer Story, Taylor and Kat reappear as regular visitors to the Metropolis neighborhood of A-Town, which is mainly populated by aliens. Along with their friend Yvette, a Black trans woman, they meet and befriend fellow trans alien Nia Nal, taking her to a ballroom competition and helping her return to her fictional hometown of Parthas. Taylor learns that Nia's mother Isabel is from Naltor, a planet of people with precognitive dreaming abilities who reneged on their promise to defend Cyandii from the Vane, and that Nia has inherited her family's matrilineal powers.

In Galaxy: As the World Falls Down, Taylor meets Superman and Ma Hunkel after rescuing Jimmy Olsen in Metropolis, and later reunites with Nia, who has dreamed of danger in her future. Taylor attends a concert at a gay bar with Nia, Kat, Yvette, and Argus, but is cornered by the Vane outside. They attempt to indoctrinate Taylor into their hive mind, but her jewel flares, and she is protected from their control. The Vane attempt to kill Taylor instead but are interrupted by her friends (with Taylor and Nia declaring themselves Galaxy and Dreamer, respectively), and Superman arrives to assist the group. Superman and Galaxy have an emotional discussion about passing for human and what it means to be a superhero, and Superman leaves to investigate the Vane. Joined by Nia in her recurring nightmare that night, Taylor learns how to manipulate dream energy. The following day, she is attacked by Superman, who has been brainwashed by the Vane. The two fight, and Taylor emits a pink blast of light from her jewel, freeing Superman's mind. Taylor and her companions regroup in Ozma Gap, and Superman leaves them again to warn the Justice League. Taylor, Kat, and Nia devise a plan to channel Taylor's jewel through a local satellite dish, but the Vane pursue Taylor while taking control of everyone on Earth, including the Justice League, the Barzelays, Nia, and finally Kat. Realizing that her jewel's pink energy is love, Taylor dons a new Galaxy costume and uses the dish to fire Earth's collective love energy at the orbiting Vane fleet, shattering their hive mind and forcing them to retreat. This frees the planet from Vane control but removes everyone's memories of the invasion except Taylor's. Still plagued by nightmares of Cyandii and her dead mother, Taylor finds comfort in Nia and Kat's support, and Ma begins training her to fight.

=== Joining the Justice League ===
In Hawkgirl (vol. 2), Taylor and Kat are reintroduced as adults who have moved to Metropolis together. Galaxy's exploits prompt scrutiny from Batman and Hawkgirl, and after the latter's extradimensional Nth metal wings are sabotaged by a new supervillain named Vulpecula, Galaxy unifies Hawkgirl's wings with her central nervous system. The two bond over their shared experiences with dissociation and seek Batman's help, who believes that Vulpecula is changing history. Vulpecula then ambushes Taylor and travels back along her timeline to a moment during the Cyandii genocide. There, she whispers instructions to a distraught young Taelyr; in the present, the adult Galaxy unwittingly carries out the instructions in order to help Hawkgirl access the energy of her past lives. This eventually allows Vulpecula to change Hawkgirl's timeline and take both heroes captive. Vulpecula causes an explosion that blasts all three into the Nth World, where she is revealed to be a fugitive trickster god. She then takes control of Galaxy and forces her to attack Hawkgirl, who realizes that Vulpecula has violated the laws of the Nth World by taking Galaxy's free will and giving her nothing in return, enabling Vulpecula's defeat. Hawkgirl expends her past lives to mend most of the damage from the explosion, and Galaxy invokes the debt she is owed to prevent Hawkgirl from dying in the process.

Galaxy is later shown to have joined the Justice League in the one-shot DC's I Saw Ma Hunkel Kissing Santa Claus, in which she battles her ex-girlfriend Stella Scarborough, introduced as a supervillain with "null energy" powers calling herself Still. In the Justice League Intergalactic Special one-shot, Galaxy is selected for a Justice League mission to Naltor with Adam Strange, Green Arrow, and Star Sapphire to investigate missing Green Lantern Corps members and the villainous Witch Queen. She invites Dreamer to accompany her, although Dreamer has since become an internationally wanted criminal and is in hiding. On Naltor, Galaxy discovers the Witch Queen is controlling dream energy to manipulate others' emotions but falls victim to the Queen herself, flying into a rage at the similarly controlled Lanterns, whom she blames for failing to protect Cyandii. Strange intervenes and Galaxy disarms the Lanterns instead. After the Witch Queen is defeated, Galaxy and Dreamer argue bitterly aboard Strange's ship, but both women suddenly fall unconscious.

In Justice League: Dream Girls, Galaxy is trapped with Dreamer in a series of imaginary adventures which recast them both in the identities of other DC heroes. Eventually, she deduces that Dreamer is creating the fantasies, and when pressed, Dreamer admits that she is suicidal and wants to escape from her own life. Galaxy is forced out of the dream realm, waking up on the Justice League satellite. There, she learns that other heroes are debating whether to expel her from the League, as her powers pose a major threat. Galaxy is inspired by Coagula to tell the League she does not need membership or their approval, and reenters the dream realm, where she rescues Dreamer (who has been manipulated throughout the series by The Key). Afterwards, Galaxy remains a League member and the two repair their friendship.

== Powers and abilities ==
Like some other Cyandii, Galaxy is able to see and manipulate virtually any type of energy or force, including kinetic energy, radiation, light, and gravity (which also enables her to fly). This ability, sometimes called "galaxy vision," extends to metaphysical and emotional energies as well, such as dreams and love. Her Cyandii biology grants her enhanced strength and toughness compared to humans.

== Reception ==
Galaxy has received critical acclaim as an example of positive transgender representation in superhero comics. Trans writer Anni Arbour praised the character in 2026 as "authentic trans representation that resonates with readers who've rarely seen themselves reflected in superhero stories." In a review of Justice League: Dream Girls for Popverse, critic Avery Kaplan called the series "a turning point for trans heroes in the DC Universe," hailing Galaxy and Dreamer as particularly important characters amid rising anti-trans sentiment in the United States.

Galaxy: The Prettiest Star was nominated for a GLAAD Media Award in 2023. It received starred reviews from Publishers Weekly and School Library Journal and a positive review in Kirkus, with broad praise for Taylor's art and Axelrod's handling of sensitive issues. Some education researchers have highlighted the novel's pedagogical value for trans youth and their teachers.
