= Hawkgirl (Kendra Saunders) =

- Kendra Saunders as featured in Jim Lee's variant cover for Hawkgirl (2018) #3.

Publication information
- Publisher: DC Comics
- First appearance: JSA: Secret Files and Origins #1 (August 1999)
- Created by: James Robinson; David S. Goyer; Scott Benefiel

In-story information
- Full name: Kendra Saunders
- Species: Metahuman
- Place of origin: Austin, Texas
- Team affiliations: Justice League; Justice Society of America; Birds of Prey; Blackhawks; Guild of Detection; Council of Immortals; Black Lantern Corps
- Partnerships: Galaxy; Hawkman (various); Martian Manhunter; Roy Harper; Vixen
- Notable aliases: Lady Blackhawk
- Abilities: Immortality, reincarnation, and vast knowledge gained from memories of past lives. Skilled archeologist, detective, and a highly trained hand-to-hand combatant and weapons expert.; Nth metal enhancements grants superhuman strength, durability, healing factor, and flight.

Kendra Saunders is a superheroine appearing in American comic books published by DC Comics. Created by writers James Robinson, David S. Goyer and artist Scott Benefiel, she first appeared in JSA: Secret Files and Origins #1 (August, 1999). The third and current Hawkgirl, this version is a Hispanic-American human and the latest in a reincarnation line of immortal warriors involving Chay-Ara and Shrra. Unlike prior versions, Kendra is characterized to seek independence from her reincarnations and Hawkman.

Originally, she was portrayed as a troubled young woman who took her own life. After her soul departed, her great-aunt's soul (Shiera Sanders Hall) inhabited hers, making her a walk-in with memories of her past and current lifetimes and is trained into becoming the latest Hawkgirl superhero while defining her terms with Hawkman. After Flashpoint, she is made the latest in a line of reincarnations from Shrra and first appeared as the leader of the Blackhawks, a covert anti-apocalyptic strike force, under the codename "Lady Blackhawk" before becoming the hero Hawkgirl as she did prior, notably joining the Justice League and Justice Society of America while living her life as a superheroine in Superman's home city, Metropolis.

Saunders has appeared in several media adaptations. Most notably, she appeared in DC Super Hero Girls voiced by Nika Futterman. In live action, she was portrayed by Ciara Renée in The CW's Arrowverse television series The Flash in the first-season finale, appeared in the Arrowverse crossover Heroes Join Forces, and starred in the first season of Legends of Tomorrow. Isabela Merced portrays the character in the DC Universe starting with the film, Superman (2025). She also reprises the character in the second season of the television series Peacemaker.

== Publication history ==
The new Hawkgirl was introduced as part of the 1999 revival of the JSA monthly title. The new Hawkgirl is Kendra Saunders, granddaughter of the Golden Age Hawkgirl's cousin, Speed Saunders. Hawkgirl would continue to appear regularly in the monthly JSA series and later in the Hawkman monthly. In 2006, the ongoing Hawkman monthly series was retitled Hawkgirl starting with issue #50 as part of the "One Year Later" jump forward; Kendra replaced Hawkman as the lead character. The Hawkgirl comic book series was finished with issue #66.

Kendra was a recurrent member of the Birds of Prey. Oracle first solicits her assistance in issue #104 in dealing with the Secret Six, for which Oracle rewards her with a car. Throughout the Russian arc, Hawkgirl serves as a team member and develops a rivalry with Secret Six member Scandal Savage.

She was a member of the Justice League of America at its relaunch, but left the team due to injuries sustained in Final Crisis. Kendra and the original Hawkman (Carter Hall) were killed during the Blackest Night storyline; Katar Hol had been killed previously in a final battle with the Hawkgod, and Carter Hall, who had reincarnated in a new body, replaced him as Hawkgirl's partner. Carter and Shiera were resurrected after Blackest Night, but Kendra has since been killed again.

== Fictional character biography ==
Hawkgirl (Kendra Saunders). Art by Jorge Jiménez.

Kendra Saunders was a young Latina woman who died by suicide. When Kendra's soul left her body, that of her grandfather's first cousin Shiera Sanders Hall, the Golden Age Hawkgirl and Carter Hall's wife entered it, making Kendra a walk-in. Her grandfather, former OSS agent and globe-trotting adventurer Speed Saunders, recognized this, in part due to a change in eye color, and encouraged his granddaughter to embrace her destiny as the "new" Hawkgirl.

Kendra had a daughter named Mia, who is not shown but mentioned.

Still believing herself to be Kendra, she debuted as a hero using the original Hawkgirl's equipment and set out in search of a being called the Fate-Child (actually her own reincarnated son, Hector Hall). This led to a meeting with the Justice Society and Kendra's induction to that team.

She currently has all of Kendra's memories, but almost none of Shiera's save for fighting experiences. This creates tension with Hawkman since he remembers all of their past lives together and believes they are destined for each other. Kendra has been presented as a very troubled young woman, haunted by the murder of her parents by a corrupt cop and confused by her jumble of memories and feelings. She has operated as Hawkman's partner but only recently begun to actually admit her attraction to him. The truth about Kendra's identity was eventually revealed to her by the angel Zauriel.

She is one of the heroes who fought in space during the Rann-Thanagar War. Following the events of Infinite Crisis, a Zeta Beam transporter malfunction injured many of the superheroes in space, including Hawkgirl, causing her to grow over twenty feet tall. Some time later, her proper stature restored, Kendra was shown living in St. Roch, Louisiana, working in Stonechat Museum and protecting the city as Hawkgirl.

She is also a returning member of the new Justice League, having effectively served with the team when the original members were previously missing. A brewing relationship between Hawkgirl and Red Arrow became one of the major subplots in the series though it appears to have ended. Hawkgirl is now 100% Kendra Saunders. Shiera Sanders' soul left Kendra's body and moved on to the afterlife. Shiera hopes her death will finally remove the curse of Hath-Set.

=== Hawkman Vol. 4 (2002–2006) ===
In the Hawkman ongoing monthly comic book series, Hawkgirl was presented as a very afflicted young woman, seeking clarity regarding the murder of her parents by a corrupt cop and confused by her jumble of memories and feelings. She had all of Kendra's memories but almost none of Shiera's. This created tension with Hawkman since he remembered all of their past lives together and believed they were destined for each other. She operated as Hawkman's partner, but eventually began to actually admit her attraction to him.

One of Kendra's past lives is revealed as the bounty hunter, Cinnamon, a reincarnation of the Egyptian princess Chay-Ara. As such, she becomes the lover of Prince Khufu's reincarnation, the hero Nighthawk. When Cinnamon is assaulted by the burglar "Gentleman Jim" Craddock, Nighthawk hangs him up, thereby tying his destiny to theirs. Cinnamon, along with Nighthawk, is killed by the latest incarnation of Hath-Set, their biggest enemy.

Kendra eventually meets with the police officer Hawkwoman, who was searching for her missing partner Katar Hol, previously possessed by a creature known as the Hawk Avatar. Also seeking to arrest the Thanagarian criminal Byth Rok, Shayera Thal asked for Kendra's help. Working together they were able to defeat the villain. Before departing to Thanagar with Byth as her prisoner, Hawkwoman gave Hawkgirl her harness as symbol of their recently formed friendship.

Hawkgirl felt that she was not the first person Hawkman would turn to in a moment of crisis, treating her as a damsel in distress incapable of holding her own, and degrading her position in both the eyes of the Justice Society of America and in their partnership. She observed that he would frequently treat her as a sidekick, a relationship that Kendra denied, wanting to be seen as his equal. Toward the end of the series Hawkgirl reveals all of her feelings to Carter, causing him to apologize and admit that he was treating her wrongly all along. The story finishes on a romantic note with the Hawks fighting together during the Rann-Thanagar War.

=== Hawkgirl, the series ===
The Hawkman ongoing monthly series was retitled to Hawkgirl, with Kendra replacing Carter as the lead character. Hawkgirl is seen protecting St. Roch, Louisiana in the absence of Hawkman, and working in Stonechat Museum. She fights Khimaera several times, finally killing her. She is later abducted and put on mock trial for high treason against her people by a group of rogue Thanagarian criminals, at the instigation of Blackfire. After declaring her guilty, one of the rogues ties her hands behind her back, covers her mouth with a piece of duct tape, and attempts to execute her by hanging — whereupon Kendra finds that she can hover without her wings, and is thus able to fake her death and defeat the criminals. Kendra then becomes a direct target of Blackfire who decides to go to Earth, herself, to kill Hawkgirl and Hawkman. Together, the Hawks defeat her and take away her powers.

Kendra later fights alongside the Furies of Darkseid when St. Roch is attacked by an evil doomsday weapon of Apokolips, a stolen Beta-3 Gizmoid. It turns out that the gizmoid is linked to the Hawks' old enemy, Hath-Set, as it had been taken to Earth ages ago and landed in Ancient Egypt during Hath-Set's reign, and hidden in a canopic jar.

Due to Hath-Set's efforts to reacquire the jar, the gizmoid is reactivated near Stonechat Museum. According to its programming, it spots Hawkgirl and, choosing her as a template, assumes her form to begin Earth's eradication. Tracking it, the Female Furies arrive by Boom Tube but are rendered conscious.

As a giant mechanized version of Hawkgirl, the gizmoid begins attacking St. Roch with its arsenal of weaponry. Bernadeth and the other Furies try to destroy the gizmoid but are unsuccessful. But, due to her brief connection with the gizmoid, Hawkgirl discovers a weakness whereby she and the Furies are able to defeat it.

Hawkgirl's plan works and the gizmoid falls to pieces, but afterward the vampiric Bloody Mary, one of the Furies, turns on Hawkgirl as she lies unconscious. Fortunately, Danny Evans had been following the battle and shows up just in time. He manages to delay Bloody Mary just long enough for Hawkgirl to reawaken and subdue her. The Female Furies collect Bloody Mary and reluctantly thank Hawkgirl for her efforts before departing.

Kendra finally resolves to take the fight to her mortal enemy, Hath-Set, who had been spying on her for some time. Hawkgirl starts getting closer to finding him with the assistance of Batman, Superman, and Oracle. During her search Kendra is kidnapped by Hath-Set and taken to Egypt. Hawkman follows on a rescue mission, but is captured and imprisoned by Hath-Set's minions. Meanwhile, Hawkgirl is able to free herself. She encounters Hath-Set, and after a final battle, kills him and saves Hawkman. The two now finally find peace, breaking the cycle of reincarnation and failure. They can see themselves falling in love again, but with Hawkgirl asserting that, this time, Carter must earn her love.

=== Justice League of America ===
Hawkgirl's main story arc in the early issues of Justice League of America Vol. 2 centered around her relationship with Red Arrow. Initially both were looking for a fling, but then found themselves in love, with Hawkgirl even meeting his daughter Lian Harper, a result of his former romance with Cheshire.

Their relationship became one of the major subplots of the series, with Black Canary's disapproval of the relationship bringing some tension to it. Additionally, Power Girl advised Red Arrow not to get involved with Hawkgirl, as she was destined to eventually return to Hawkman (Carter Hall). Despite everything the two started dating, with the Justice League later finding out after Red Tornado caught Hawkgirl and Red Arrow sleeping together.

This was the beginning of a turbulent relationship, with past relationships, parenting, and the inability to express their feelings to each other causing problems. Red Arrow's constant pain due Cheshire's absence, and Hawkgirl conflicted feelings regarding Hawkman brought stress in their romance, causing the couple to fight regularly. Eventually the relationship dissolved and Red Arrow left the Justice League.

While in a mission with the Justice League inside the Prison Planet, Hawkgirl discovered another ability provided by the Nth Metal, the power to weaken forces drawn from the fabric of space-time. Thus, Kendra was the only member not affected by Kanjar Ro, enabling her to fight against the villain and rescue her friends. Hawkgirl then left the Justice League due to injuries sustained in Final Crisis.

=== Blackest Night ===
In Blackest Night #1, Kendra is shown having an argument with Hawkman over whether or not to visit Jean Loring's grave with the Atom. As the two heroes quarrel, the reanimated corpses of Ralph and Sue Dibny, now members of the Black Lantern Corps, enter Hawkman's sanctuary. The Black Lanterns attack, Sue impaling Hawkgirl on a spear. Ralph taunts Hawkman, telling him that Hawkgirl never loved him; a claim she refutes with her dying breath. Hawkman is killed shortly afterward, and both heroes are reanimated as Black Lanterns by Black Hand.

During the battling at Coast City, the Atom is chosen by the Indigo Tribe to be more effective against Nekron's forces. The Atom tells Indigo-1 to keep his involvement in the deployment of the troops a secret, and asks that she help him find a way to legitimately resurrect Hawkman and Hawkgirl. In the final battle, the duo are transformed by Hal Jordan into the White Lantern Corps and upon Nekron's destruction, they are both resurrected. Hawkgirl says she remembers all her past lives, then unmasks to reveal herself to be Shiera, she and Carter joyfully reuniting.

=== Brightest Day ===
In the Brightest Day crossover, Carter and Shiera follow Hath-Set, who has collected the bones from all of their past bodies, and created from them a portal to Hawkworld. While there, Shiera is told by the Entity to stop Hath-Set from killing Carter because if he dies one more time, he will not undergo the cycle of resurrection again. Shiera is attacked in Hawkworld's dungeon and captured by Hath-Set. She is then taken to the Queen of Hawkworld, who reveals to Shiera that she is her mother. Hawkgirl is tied by Hath-Set and Queen Khea to the gateway, and they strike her to lure Hawkman to the location. Hawkman and his group of the panthera attack the Manhawks homeworld. When Hawkman arrives and draws his attention, Shiera turns the tables on Hath-Set and uses her legs to snap his neck, killing him. In the meantime, Hawkman is held by Queen Khea's control of Nth metal mace and armor, and she puts Carter with Shiera. Queen Khea opens the gateway and enters the portal to the Zamaron homeworld. When she arrives on the Zamaron homeworld, Star Sapphire (Carol Ferris) frees them both to stop Queen Khea's invasion. Hawkgirl soon faces her mother, but the Predator feels the lack of love inside Khea's heart bond with her and does not know if she truly is able to contain the power of true love.

The Predator makes Khea his host, but Shiera and Carter manage to separate both of them by stabbing Khea at the same time with weapons made of Zamaronian crystals. The bones of the past lives of Hawkman and Hawkgirl separate from the gateway and, animated by the power of the violet light of love, grab Khea and imprison her in the Zamaronian Central Power Battery. Shiera and Carter, with both of their missions accomplished, have their lives returned and Carol teleports both of them back to the museum of St. Roch. There, the couple, happy for finally defeating the curse, start to take off their clothes to make love, but they are suddenly interrupted by the apparition of Deadman, brought there by his white ring. The ring gives Shiera and Carter an order that they must live separately to live life stronger (because they appreciate love more than life itself), but when Carter replies by saying they are not going to live apart again, the ring responds "So be it" and unleashes a blast of white light that turns Hawkman and Hawkgirl into white dust, while Deadman looks in horror. Deadman orders the ring to resurrect both Hawkman and Hawkgirl, but the ring refuses, and tells him that Hawkgirl is unique and that she was brought back life to overcome what held her back in her past life because she is essential in saving Earth.

When the "Dark Avatar" made his presence known, Hawkgirl and Hawkman are revealed to be part of the Elementals. They were transformed by the Entity to become the element of air and protect the Star City forest from the Dark Avatar, which appears to be the Black Lantern version of the Swamp Thing. The Elementals are then fused with the body of Alec Holland in order for him to be transformed by the Entity into the new Swamp Thing and battle against the Dark Avatar. After the Dark Avatar is defeated, Swamp Thing appears to have brought the Elementals back to normal; however, as Hawkman looks around for Shiera, he discovers that she was not brought back like he was. He is later told by Swamp Thing that Shiera is everywhere, revealing that she is still the elemental of air. Afterward, Hawkman returns home yelling "Shiera".

=== The New 52 ===
In 2011, DC Comics rebooted its continuity as part of the publishing event The New 52. In stories set on DC's Prime Earth, the Savage Hawkman story arc "Hawkman Wanted" (Savage Hawkman #13-16, and optionally issues #0 and #12) explains the character's place in the New 52. Shayera Thal is revealed as the princess of Thanagar, former lover of Katar Hol and sister of the Emperor Corsar. Initially, she is depicted as a villain, seeking revenge against Katar and coming to Earth to bring Katar to justice for his crimes against Thanagar and the murder of Corsar. It is later evident that Katar was innocent and Shayera is surprised when she discovers her brother alive and behind Katar's arrest in the attempt to part Katar from the Nth metal and own it for himself. She then sacrifices herself to save Katar's life.

Following DC's Convergence storyline, the Silver Age version of Hawkgirl is featured in a Pre-Crisis universe. With the story taking place right after the events of Shadow of War miniseries, Hawkman and Hawkgirl have been captured inside a domed Gotham City. They are featured working as curators in the city's museum, while also fighting crime against hidden Thanagarians that had the original intent of conquest over the Earth, admitting later that they abandoned it when the dome came down. One of the rogues explains that they have seen the future, and that their universe will not survive. Hawkman and Hawkgirl watch as their world starts collapsing due to the Crisis, but they also realize that there might be a new beginning and they fly off with hope in their hearts.

=== DC Rebirth ===
In March 2016, DC Comics developed DC Rebirth, as a relaunch of its entire line of ongoing monthly superhero comic books. Using the end of The New 52 initiative in May 2016 as its launching point, DC Rebirth restored the DC Universe to a form much like that prior to the Flashpoint storyline while still incorporating numerous elements of The New 52, including its continuity.

Following this, Hawkgirl made her first appearance in Dark Days: The Forge and Dark Days: The Casting, which served as a prelude to Dark Nights: Metal.

Hawkgirl was originally born as Chay-Ara, the lover of the Egyptian prince Khufu. One night, Khufu and Chay-Ara discovered a Thanagarian ship that had landed on Earth. The ship was made of the mysterious Nth Metal. Exposure to the metal forced Chay-Ara and Khufu, as well as their enemy Hath-Set, into a cycle of endless reincarnation through time and space. Chay-Ara lived countless lives, before being reborn most recently as Kendra Saunders, while her lover's latest incarnation is Carter Hall.

Kendra Saunders made her DC Rebirth debut in Dark Nights: Metal #1, she is introduced as the leader of the current Blackhawks, an anti-apocalyptic team. Seeking to prevent the Dark Knights' invasion on Earth, Hawkgirl warned the Justice League of the upcoming invasion of the Dark Multiverse and later worked with the League to help them defeat the Dark Knights. Hawkgirl is also a member of the Immortal Men, a group of the oldest beings of Earth. As such, she was entrusted by the Immortals with the mission of using the Anti-Monitor's astral brain in the Rock of Eternity to destroy the Dark Knights. However, when she tried to do so, she was interrupted by Barbatos who transformed her into a dark-hawk version of herself called Lady Blackhawk. It's later revealed that because of Barbatos's influence, Kendra's bond to the Nth Metal was merged into her being. She now boasts an altered physiology reminiscent to her past life as a Thanagarian, which resulted in the grafting of Nth Metal wings to Hawkgirl's back.

Hawkgirl regained control of her body after Wonder Woman used her Lasso of Truth on her, restoring Kendra's memories. After finding Hawkman's Nth Metal mace, Wonder Woman and Hawkgirl travel through a portal to Earth, where they battle corrupted versions of the Justice League. During their battle, Hawkgirl encounters Hawkman possessed by Barbatos. She releases him from the villain's command after encouraging Carter to remember all their past lives together. After assisting in the defeat of Barbatos and the Dark Knights, Hawkgirl is recruited to join the new Justice League.

Searching for answers related to her new Nth Metal wings, Hawkgirl went on a mission to Thanagar Prime with Martian Manhunter and John Stewart. There Kendra encountered Shayera Hol, the Silver Age Hawkgirl. Shayera is shown as the Empress of Thanagar and protective of the planet's secrets. Kendra reveals that Shayera is indeed her previous life and Starman says that the two are existing at the same time is because of Perpetua and the Totality breaking the chain of resurrection and splitting the two. As such, Kendra and Shayera are two completely separate people .

Later, Kendra would come to learn that she had a pivotal role in healing the Source Wall that was previously destroyed in the Dark Nights: Metal event. Her Nth Metal wings were entrusted with the power to restore the Source Wall's integrity. After discovering this, Kendra tried to save the universe by sacrificing herself to the Source Wall, but her plan was thwarted by Brainiac.

Hawkgirl is a member of the relaunched Justice League bi-weekly series, written by Scott Snyder.

Hawkgirl was a member of the Justice League roster during the events of Death Metal. Kendra, and the rest of the team, were assigned to rescue the Legion of Doom from Perpetua's grasp.

Hawkgirl is also shown as a member of the Guild of Detectives, a group featuring the greatest detectives of Earth.

=== Infinite Frontier ===
After the conclusion of Dark Nights: Death Metal, Hawkgirl is once again core member of the new Justice League series, written by Brian Michael Bendis.

=== Dawn of DC ===
After the conclusion of Dark Crisis, with the Justice League disbanding, Hawkgirl got an ongoing solo book in 2023, exploring her new life in Metropolis. The book was written by Jadzia Axelrod and illustrated by Amancay Nahuelpan. Galaxy is a supporting character in the series.

== Characterization ==
=== Description ===
Hawkgirl (Kendra Saunders). Art by Jorge Jiménez.

Saunders is a Hispanic-American whom was first introduced as a film school student early in her publication history whom became a walk in after Kendra's suicide and Shiera Sander's (her great aunt) soul enters her body, adding her to Chay-Ara's reincarnation line, and is trained by her grandfather into the Hawkgirl role. In her re-introduction following Flashpoint, her family's origin is tied to Cuba and was first the leader of the anti-apocalyptic strike force team, the Blackhawks, before converting to the superhero upon realizing she is a reincarnation of Shrra (which included Shiera and Chay-Ara).

Similar to other past reincarnations, she is known for her fighting abilities and ferocity, considered among the most fastest and capable aerial combatants on Earth. Differing from her predecessors, a reoccurring theme includes distancing herself Hawkman and her reincarnation line, having pursued romances with different characters and was once reluctant in connecting with Hector Hall. She is also noted to having a sisterhood with fellow female superheroes, an opportunity absent from her predecessors due to often originating from male-dominated societies.

=== Familial connections ===
Both continuities features her parents to be Michael and Trina Saunders and the granddaughter of Speed Saunders. Subjected to a teenage pregnancy in high school, she birthed her daughter Mia but gave her up for adoption. Originally, her past lifetime Shiera Sanders-Hall was her deceased great-aunt and thus, also made Hector Hall (in his original lifetime) her cousin (first cousin, once removed) and Carter Hall her great-uncle. Later revisions to her history makes her Shiera's distance cousin, which also makes Hector and Carter distant cousins (the latter via affinity).

=== Love interests ===
With Kendra's characterization of her independence from her reincarnation line and Hawkman, the character has had romantic relationships with other, including Roy Harper and Martian Manhunter. She was also pursued by college friend and civilian Abilene Park but was rebuffed due to disinterest in relationships within the story.

== Powers and abilities ==
With powers originated from Nth metal grafted into her physiology, she possesses superhuman strength, durability, a healing factor, and can fly. Originally, her abilities came from a harness and large wings she can control whereas later portrayals instead grant her power through the metal, which later grafted with her physiology, granting her powers similar to her Thanagarian lifetime. She is also immortal and remembers her past lives, resulting in a vast amount of knowledge. This knowledge makes her a trained archaeologist with an affinity for ancient Egyptian history and alien worlds, a capable detective with keen investigative abilities, and a highly skilled warrior capable in both armed and unarmed combat.

== Other versions ==
=== Earth 2 ===
Hawkgirl on the cover of Earth 2 #4 (October, 2012). Art by Ivan Reis.

In 2011, DC Comics rebooted its continuity as part of the publishing event The New 52. Following this, a reimagined Kendra Saunders version of Hawkgirl features in the comic book Earth 2, set in the parallel reality of that designation. Her full origin has not been revealed other than some insinuation of her background as part of a secret program that included Al Pratt. It is later revealed that Kendra Munoz-Saunders is a professional treasure hunter, and was hired by the World Army before an unrevealed event occurred in Egypt that resulted in the grafting of wings to Kendra's back, the same time Khalid Ben-Hassin found the Helmet of Fate.

Some time later, Kendra met with the Flash in Europe. She was guided by a certain Fate as to where she might find him. Together, they went to Washington, D.C., and fought Solomon Grundy, without much success. They were later joined by Green Lantern, and subsequently by the Atom. To defeat Grundy, Green Lantern carried him out of the Earth's atmosphere, and stranded him on the moon.

Despite his help against Grundy, the Atom, under orders from the World Army, tried to capture Hawkgirl, but she escaped with the help of the Flash. Green Lantern then returned to Earth after removing the danger of the nuclear missiles that the World Army launched under the advice of Terry Sloan. Unfortunately, he had run out of power, after using so much of it to defeat Grundy. He was saved by Hawkgirl, who caught him in mid-free fall.

Hawkgirl then visited the apartment of Alan Scott who was still mourning over the death of his partner Sam. Hawkgirl's detective skills allowed her to discover that Alan and Green Lantern were one and the same. She tried to convince him to join her and the Flash to form a team against the coming danger. Since then, Hawkgirl alongside the Flash, Green Lantern and Doctor Fate formed the Wonders of the World.

During the events of The Tower of Fate Hawkgirl is seen New Orleans trying to make Doctor Fate join her in an attempt to fight against the war with Apokolips. Later, she is shown in Louisiana locating a Parademon cell, Green Lantern appears and asks for her help with finding why his husband was murdered. Together with Kendra, Alan manages to learn much more about Sam, and within the span of a few hours the treasure huntress has completely outclassed all of the detectives earlier hired by Mr. Zhao. They are flying above the Chinese harbor when Kendra notes that they've reached the point where there was supposed to be a clue, as one of the containers contain something which is connected to Sam's death. Once they open the container however, Alan and Kendra discover to their shock numerous dead Parademons heaped atop one another. Surprised by their findings and wondering how this got Sam killed, they decide to backtrack to their previous source, the mob leader Eddie Kai.

Unfortunately, before they can continue their search the Green reaches out to Alan and implores him to return to America. While Alan resists as much as he can, the force of the command proves too irresistible and he's forced to leave Kendra behind despite her protests, when he leaves however he begs Kendra to keep looking in his place. Still helping Alan with his problem, Hawkgirl is seen in a graveyard searching for answers, there she is attacked by genetically enhanced Apokorats ridden by Apokolips warriors, Batman assists her and tells her to go search for Kanto, the assassin of Apokolips. She finds out that Alan's dead husband, was mixed up with Apokolips battle tech.

When the second invasion of Apokolips in Earth-2 happened, the Wonders of the World, tried to save Earth-2 from destruction, unsuccessfully, they had to evacuate to an Earth twin, only two million survived the war. In 2015, the follow-on series called Earth 2: Society showed the survivors of Earth-2's war with Apokolips, such as Hawkgirl, Green Lantern and The Flash, finding themselves on a new world having to create a fresh life there.

=== Gotham City Garage ===
Kendra Saunders's version of Hawkgirl is featured in the Gotham City Garage series. She is the youngest member of a very old team. It's revealed that Kendra's parents were killed during an alien invasion, she was later rescued by the Blackhawks and trained from a young age with Captain Blackhawk. She is shown using the Lady Blackhawk costume and the alias Kendra Blackhawk. She resigns from the Blackhawks to help the Gotham City Garage against Lex Luthor's attacks.

=== DCeased ===
Kendra Saunders's version of Hawkgirl is featured in the DCeased comic book series. In this alternative Earth where a zombie-like virus has infected most of the planet, Kendra is one of the remaining survivors. She informs the Justice League that Captain Atom is about to self-implode, giving Black Canary's green lantern ring just enough time to shield them from the blast. Hawkgirl is later able to evacuate from Earth alongside a few civilians and Justice League members.

She is shown in the sequel DCeased: Dead Planet, that is set five years after the original mini-series. The survivors make Earth-2 their new home, but after they receive a distress signal from Cyborg, Kendra, amidst other heroes, returns to Earth to respond to the signal.

=== DC X Sonic the Hedgehog ===
Kendra Saunders's version of Hawkgirl makes an appearance in the intercompany crossover DC X Sonic the Hedgehog. Appearing in the third issue, she and Supergirl are subdued by Gorilla Grodd with his enhanced psychic powers, until they are aided by a Wonder Woman-suited Amy Rose. After Grodd and his Gorilla army are defeated, Hawkgirl nearly smashes the device enhancing Grodd's powers, until Amy stops her, revealing the source of the device is a Chaos Emerald.

== In other media ==
=== Television ===
Ciara Renée as Kendra Saunders / Hawkgirl in the television series DC's Legends of Tomorrow.

- Kendra Saunders / Hawkgirl, with elements of Shiera Sanders Hall, appears in media set in the Arrowverse, portrayed by Ciara Renée. This version is the reincarnation of Egyptian priestess Chay-Ara, who was killed by Hath-Set alongside her lover, Prince Khufu, and cast a spell to allow her and Khufu to live forever through reincarnation.
  - Saunders first appears as a recurring character in The Flash. After arriving in Central City and becoming a barista, she briefly dates Cisco Ramon.
  - In the crossover event "Heroes Join Forces", Saunders is hunted by Hath-Set, now the immortal Vandal Savage, and encounters Prince Khufu's reincarnation, Carter Hall / Hawkman. She also discovers her heritage, past life as Chay-Ara, and powers as Hawkgirl. Joining forces with Ramon, Hall, the Flash, the Green Arrow, and their allies, Saunders unlocks her powers and works with them to defeat Savage. Despite learning of her destiny with Carter, she remains affectionate with Ramon.
  - Saunders appears in Legends of Tomorrow, in which she and Hall join the Legends to defeat a future version of Savage. Along the way, the team discovers that only Saunders can kill Savage by using the dagger she held as Chay-Ara when she originally died. Over the course of the series, she loses Hall, but develops a new relationship with Ray Palmer, which becomes complicated when they are temporarily stranded in the 1950s and pose as a married couple despite the tensions of an inter-racial couple in that era as well as the complexities of her "relationship" with Hall. After reuniting with one of Hall's reincarnations, she successfully kills Savage before she and Hall leave the Legends to be together.

=== Film ===
Kendra Saunders / Hawkgirl makes a non-speaking cameo appearance in The Lego Batman Movie.

=== DC Universe ===
Kendra Saunders / Hawkgirl appears in media set in the DC Universe, portrayed by Isabela Merced. This version is a member of Maxwell Lord's Justice Gang.

- Saunders made her first appearance in Superman.She and her team collaborated extensively with Superman after it was revealed that he had been sent to Earth as a conqueror. However, she and the Justice Gang assist Superman by thwarting a military invasion of Boravia on his behalf.
- Saunders appears in the Peacemaker episode "The Ties That Grind".
- Saunders will appear in Man of Tomorrow.

=== Video games ===
- Kendra Saunders / Hawkgirl appears as an unlockable playable character in Justice League Heroes, voiced by Collette Whittaker. This version possesses Black Canary's supersonic scream.
- Kendra Saunders / Hawkgirl appears in DC Universe Online via the "Dark Nights: Metal" DLC. She fights the Dark Multiverse's invasion on Thanagar and Earth before The Batman Who Laughs turns her into Lady Blackhawk, which leads to the player rescuing her.
- Kendra Saunders / Hawkgirl appears as a playable character in Infinite Crisis, voiced by Maria Canals-Barrera.

=== Miscellaneous ===
Hawkgirl as she appears in DC Super Hero Girls.

- Kendra Saunders / Hawkgirl appears in DC Super Hero Girls and its tie-in films, voiced by Nika Futterman. This version is Super Hero High's hall monitor and a member of the school's detective club.
- Kendra Saunders / Hawkgirl appears in the DC Super Hero Girls tie-in comic book.

== Collected editions ==
Title	Material collected	Publication date	ISBN
Hawkgirl: The Maw	Hawkgirl Vol. 1 #50-56	April 2007	ISBN 978-1-4012-1246-9
Hawkgirl: Hawkman Returns	Hawkgirl Vol. 1 #57-60 JSA: Classified #21-22	November 2007	ISBN 978-1-4012-1488-3
Hawkgirl: Hath-Set	Hawkgirl Vol. 1 #61-66	March 2008	ISBN 978-1-4012-1488-3
Hawkgirl: Once Upon a Galaxy	Hawkgirl (2023) #1-6	June 2024	ISBN 978-1779525109

== See also ==
- Hawkwoman
