= GLAAD Media Award for Outstanding Graphic Novel/Anthology =

Annual US graphic novel writers award

The GLAAD Media Award for Outstanding Graphic Novel/Anthology is an annual award that honors graphic novels for excellence in the depiction of LGBT (lesbian, gay, bisexual, and transgender) characters and themes. It is one of several categories of the annual GLAAD Media Awards, presented by GLAAD—an American non-governmental media monitoring organization—at ceremonies in New York City, Los Angeles, and San Francisco between March and June.

Comic books and graphic novels selected by GLAAD are evaluated based on four criteria: "Fair, Accurate, and Inclusive Representations" of the LGBT community, "Boldness and Originality" of the project, significant "Impact" on mainstream culture, and "Overall Quality" of the project. GLAAD monitors mainstream media to identify which comic books will be nominated, while also issuing a Call for Entries that encourages media outlets to submit titles for consideration. Comics created by and for an LGBT audience must be submitted in order to be considered for nomination, as GLAAD does not monitor such works for defamation. Winners are determined by a plurality vote by GLAAD staff and board, Shareholders Circle members, as well as volunteers and allies. Nominees in this category must be an original graphic novel or an anthology of short stories appearing in the same book released by a mainstream publisher and its subsidiary labels. At GLAAD's discretion, a graphic novel or anthology from another publisher may be nominated if the book achieves a similar level of visibility and impact. Trade paperbacks of previously published material are not eligible.

The category was first introduced at the 33rd GLAAD Media Awards in 2022 as a sister category to the GLAAD Media Award for Outstanding Comic Book, which honored both comics and graphic novels from 1992 to 2021. The inaugural winner of the award was Cheer Up: Love and Pompoms, a graphic novel by Crystal Frasier which was published by Oni Press.

== Winners and nominees ==
‡	Indicates the winner

Award year	Comic	Writer(s)	Publisher	Ref(s).
2022 (33rd)	Cheer Up! Love and Pompoms‡	Crystal Frasier, Val Wise, Oscar O. Jupiter	Oni Press	
2022 (33rd)	DC Pride [anthology]	various	DC Comics	
2022 (33rd)	Eighty Days	A.C. Esguerra	Archaia/BOOM! Studios	
2022 (33rd)	The Girl from the Sea	Lee Knox Ostertag, Maarta Laiho	Graphix/Scholastic	
2022 (33rd)	Girl Haven	Lilah Sturges, Meaghan Carter, Joamette Gil	Oni Press	
2022 (33rd)	I Am Not Starfire	Mariko Tamaki, Yoshi Yoshitani, Aditya Bidikar	DC Comics	
2022 (33rd)	Marvel's Voices: Pride [anthology]	various	Marvel Comics	
2022 (33rd)	Renegade Rule	Ben Kahn, Rachel Silverstein, Sam Beck, Jim Campbell	Dark Horse Comics	
2022 (33rd)	The Secret to Superhuman Strength	Alison Bechdel, Holly Rae Taylor	Mariner Books/HMH	
2022 (33rd)	Shadow Life	Hiromi Goto, Ann Xu	First Second/Macmillan	
2023 (34th)	Young Men in Love‡	various	A Wave Blue World	
2023 (34th)	Chef's Kiss	Jarrett Melendez, Danica Brine, Hank Jones and Hassan Otsmane-Elhaou	Oni Press	
2023 (34th)	Coven	Jennifer Dugan, Kit Seaton	Putnam	
2023 (34th)	DC Pride 2022	various	DC Comics	
2023 (34th)	Doughnuts and Doom	Balazs Lorinczi	Top Shelf Productions	
2023 (34th)	Fine: A Comic About Gender	Rhea Ewing	W.W. Norton & Company	
2023 (34th)	Galaxy: The Prettiest Star	Jadzia Axelrod, Vash Taylor	DC Comics	
2023 (34th)	Heartstopper Volume 4	Alice Oseman	GRAPHIX	
2023 (34th)	Magical Boy	The Kao	GRAPHIX	
2023 (34th)	Marvel's Voices: Pride #1	various	Marvel Comics	
2024 (35th)	Four-Color Heroes‡	Richard Fairgray	Fanbase Press	
2024 (35th)	Blackward	Lawrence Lindell	Drawn & Quarterly	
2024 (35th)	Carmilla: The First Vampire	Amy Chu	Berger Books / Dark Horse Comics	
2024 (35th)	Cosmoknights (Book Two)	Hannah Templer	Top Shelf Productions	
2024 (35th)	Heartstopper Vol. 5	Alice Oseman	Graphix / Scholastic	
2024 (35th)	Light Carries On	Ray Nadine	Dark Horse Books	
2024 (35th)	Northranger	Rey Terciero	HarperAlley	
2024 (35th)	Parallel	Matthias Lehmann	Oni Press	
2024 (35th)	Roaming	Jillian Tamaki, Mariko Tamaki	Drawn & Quarterly	
2024 (35th)	Us	Sara Soler	Dark Horse Books	
2025 (36th)	Becoming Who We Are: Real Stories About Growing Up Trans, [anthology] ‡	various	A Wave Blue World	
2025 (36th)	Ash’s Cabin	Jen Wang	First Second	
2025 (36th)	Bad Dream: A Dreamer Story	Nicole Maines, Rye Hickman	DC Comics	
2025 (36th)	Deadendia: The Divine Order	Hamish Steele	Union Square & Co.	
2025 (36th)	The Deep Dark	Lee Knox Ostertag	GRAPHIX	
2025 (36th)	The Fox Maidens	Robin Ha	HarperAlley	
2025 (36th)	Lunar Boy	Jes Wibowo and Cin Wibowo	HarperAlley	
2025 (36th)	My Fairy Godfather	Robert Mailer Anderson, Jon Sack	Fantagraphics	
2025 (36th)	The Ribbon Skirt	Cameron Mukwa	GRAPHIX	
2025 (36th)	The Science of Ghosts	Lilah Sturges, El Garing, Alitha Martinez, Hassan Otsmane-Elhaou, Jimmy Betancourt	Legendary Comics	
2026 (37th)	Gaysians‡	Mike Curato	Algonquin Books	
2026 (37th)	Cannon	Lee Lai	Drawn & Quarterly	
2026 (37th)	Dan in Green Gables	Rey Terciero, Claudia Aguirre	Penguin Workshop	
2026 (37th)	First Kiss with Fangs	Marker Snyder	Holiday House	
2026 (37th)	Hey, Mary!	Andrew Wheeler, Rye Hickman, Hank Jones, Frank Cvetkovic	Oni Press	
2026 (37th)	It Rhymes With Takei	George Takei, Steven Scott, Justin Eisinger, Harmony Becker, José Villarrubia	Top Shelf Productions	
2026 (37th)	Low Orbit	Kazimir Lee	Top Shelf Productions	
2026 (37th)	A Song for You and I	K. O'Neill	Random House Graphic	
2026 (37th)	Spent	Alison Bechdel, Holly Rae Taylor, Jon Chad	Mariner Books	
2026 (37th)	Trans History: From Ancient Times to the Present Day	Alex L. Combs, Andrew Eakett, Tif Bucknor	Candlewick Press	
