= Bad Dream: A Dreamer Story =

2024 graphic novel

- Date: April 2, 2024
- Publisher: DC Comics

Creative team
- Writer: Nicole Maines
- Artist: Rye Hickman
- Letterer: Hassan Otsmane-Elhaou
- Colorist: Bex Glendining
- ISBN: 9781779510457

Bad Dream: A Dreamer Story is a 2024 DC Comics graphic novel written by Nicole Maines and illustrated by Rye Hickman. It retells the origin story of Nia Nal / Dreamer, who was originally introduced in the Supergirl TV series before being brought into the main DC Comics continuity in 2021.

== Background ==
The character of Nia Nal / Dreamer was originally created for the Supergirl TV series, where she was played by Maines. The comics version of Nia debuted in DC Pride 2021, in a segment titled "Date Night" also written by Maines, with a preview of Bad Dream being included in DC Pride 2023.

Taylor / Galaxy, a major character in the book, was introduced in Galaxy: The Prettiest Star.

== Plot ==
Nia is a young trans woman in Parthas, a community of alien refugees on Earth. Her father is human while her mother is a human-like alien known as a Naltorian. Certain Naltorian women, including Nia's mother, have the ability to predict the future through their dreams. Everyone believes Nia's cisgender sister Maeve will be the one to inherit their mother's abilities, so when Nia starts having precognitive dreams of her own, she panics and runs away to Metropolis. There, Nia finds solace in a trio of queer girls including fellow alien and trans girl Taylor. Returning home to try and reconcile with her family, she finds them threatened by an evil Naltorian named Sybyll.

== Reception ==
Kirkus Reviews gave Bad Dream a starred review, describing the plot as working both as a "transgender coming-of-age story and an alien-filled superhero origin story." The reviewer also noted how the book could appeal even to readers unfamiliar with mainline DC Comics publications. It was also included in Kirkus' 2024 lists of Best Teen & YA Graphic Literature and Best Young Adult Books of the Year.

Andy Oliver of Broken Frontier concluded that the book was an "unforgettable story about acceptance, identity and finding your place in the world."

The book was a finalist for the 2025 GLAAD Media Award for Outstanding Graphic Novel/Anthology.
