= The Ribbon Skirt =

2024 graphic novel by Cameron Mukwa

- Date: November 12, 2024
- Publisher: Graphix

Creative team
- Creator: Cameron Mukwa
- ISBN: 9781338843255

The Ribbon Skirt is a graphic novel by Cameron Mukwa (Little Traverse Odawa). It was published by Graphix on November 12, 2024, and follows a two-spirit tween who makes their own ribbon skirt.

== Plot ==
The book opens with Anang, an Ojibwe ten-year-old who is two-spirit and non-binary, and their grandparents driving to a Water Protector ceremony. Anang is excited for the upcoming powwow and wants to wear a ribbon skirt, but is nervous that they cannot do so as they are not a girl or a boy and are afraid their peers will accept them. Anang's nookomis (grandmother) advises to them to talk to Gichigami (Lake Superior). At the ceremony, Anang asks the lake is they can wear the ribbon skirt, and the lake and the turtles in it speak back to Anang's surprise, telling them they can.

At lunch after the ceremony, Anang runs into their former friend Sherry, who has been distant since Anang got in trouble for using the girl's toilet at their school. Nookomis reveals that Sherry will be temporarily staying with them as her divorced father is on a trip. That night, Anang dreams of a design for their ribbon skirt. Over the next few days Anang, Sherry, and Miigwan, another friend of Anang, go to gather the four materials needed to craft the skirt: thread, elastic, fabric, and ribbon. Along the way, they encounter various speaking animals and spirits. Once they have gathered all the materials, Sherry apologizes for her earlier behaviour and she and Anang make up. Anang's nookomis then help them finish crafting their ribbon skirt from the materials, and the book ends as Anang dances at the powwow.

== Reception ==
The Ribbon Skirt received starred reviews from School Library Journal and Publisher Weekly. Amy Ribakove of School Library Journal remarked that Anang was an "endearing protagonist who remains true to themself, even when faced with rejection from a former best friend," while Publisher Weekly called the book an "enlightening and satisfying look at one child's desire to advocate for themself and be respected by those around them." Both reviewers noted the inclusion of material informing readers about ribbon skirts, powwows, and related topics at the back of the book.

The book was a finalist for the 2025 GLAAD Media Award for Outstanding Graphic Novel/Anthology and the 2026 American Indian Youth Literature Award for Best Middle School Book. It was also included in 2024 Best Graphic Novels for Children reading list by Graphic Novels & Comics Round Table.
