= Agent Liberty =

- Cover to Agent Liberty Special #1 by Dan Jurgens.

Publication information
- Publisher: DC Comics
- First appearance: Superman (vol. 2) #60 (October 1991)
- Created by: Dan Jurgens

In-story information
- Alter ego: Benjamin Lockwood
- Team affiliations: Sons of Liberty; CIA; Justice League
- Abilities: Expert in military tactics; Skilled hand-to-hand combatant and marksman; Utilizes weaponized battle suit equipped with retractable blades, a forcefield generator, and a jet pack for flight

Agent Liberty is a fictional character appearing in American comic books published by DC Comics. Created by Dan Jurgens, the character debuted in Superman vol. 2 #60 (October 1991), and was later given his own solo adventure in Agent Liberty Special #1 (1992).

Sam Witwer portrayed a loosely adapted version of the character on the live-action Arrowverse television series Supergirl.

== Fictional character biography ==
=== Benjamin Lockwood ===
Benjamin "Benjy" Lockwood once worked for the CIA, but ultimately left in disgust at their methods and the types of missions he was being asked to undertake. He became so disenchanted with the federal government as a whole that he joined the Sons of Liberty, a paramilitary group who gave him the equipment to be Agent Liberty. As Agent Liberty, Lockwood helped to further the Sons of Liberty's cause of overturning the governmental regime which brought him into conflict with Superman, though he later briefly assisted the Justice League in battling Brainiac in the crossover Panic in the Sky. When the Sons of Liberty asked him to assassinate politician Pete Ross, Lockwood refused and instead helped to bring down the group by sending vital information to Clark Kent.

Lockwood later learned that his former CIA mentor Charles Holcraft was the founder of the Sons of Liberty, getting so disgusted with this revelation that he burned his Agent Liberty costume and vowed to never adopt the Agent Liberty persona again. However, Lockwood subsequently became one of the many unwillingly brainwashed victims of a cult started by Brainiac and took up the Agent Liberty identity once more. Agent Liberty and the other kidnapped metahumans were rescued by Huntress and Vixen. Later, during the Earth-shaking crisis of Infinite Crisis, Agent Liberty was seen at a mass for fallen and missing superheroes.

The death of Agent Liberty. Art by Pete Woods.

Dozens of heroes, Agent Liberty included, also gathered to defend Metropolis from the Secret Society of Super-Villains. He was seen heading for a heavily armed cyborg being; the Society ultimately lost the battle.

Agent Liberty came out of retirement to act as a member of the President's security detail while meeting with Superman and other Kryptonians newly arrived on Earth.

Agent Liberty was killed by Superwoman after the latter learned that he had been spying on Sam Lane and Lex Luthor. His body was dumped in Metropolis Harbor, where he was discovered and brought ashore by a group of boaters.

DC Rebirth rebooted the character as an operative of the D.E.O.

=== Second version ===
During the "Codename: Patriot" arc, an unidentified female incarnation of Agent Liberty was part of President Martin Suarez's security team. She was killed during Ursa's attack on the White House during the War of the Supermen storyline.

=== Third version ===
During the Dawn of DC storyline, an unidentified male incarnation of Agent Liberty appeared as part of a splinter group of the Sons of Liberty.

== Powers and abilities ==
Benjamin Lockwood is highly skilled in military tactics, hand-to-hand combat and marksmanship. His Agent Liberty high-tech battle suit can generate a force-field of energy capable of deflecting bullets and houses weapons such as retractable gauntlet blades. He wears a jetpack that allows flight and was able to summon attack helicopters and other assistance from the Sons of Liberty.

== In other media ==
=== Television ===
Ben Lockwood / Agent Liberty as he appears in Supergirl.

Benjamin "Ben" Lockwood appears in the fourth season of Supergirl, portrayed by Sam Witwer. This version is a college history professor who lost his home and father Peter during the events of the second and third seasons respectively. Upon being fired by the university for his anti-alien opinions, Ben was approached by Lex Luthor's subordinates, Mercy Graves and Otis Graves, who gave him the equipment needed to be a self-proclaimed "Agent of Liberty". Ben subsequently goes on to found the Children of Liberty and create a human-first world order, ridding National City of alien life whilst keeping his actions secret from his wife Lydia and son George, and antagonizing Supergirl. Additionally, an alternate timeline version of Ben appears in the fifth season episode "It's a Super Life".

=== Video games ===
The Benjamin Lockwood incarnation of Agent Liberty appears as a character summon in Scribblenauts Unmasked: A DC Comics Adventure.
