= Richard Fairgray =

New Zealand writer and illustrator (born 1985)

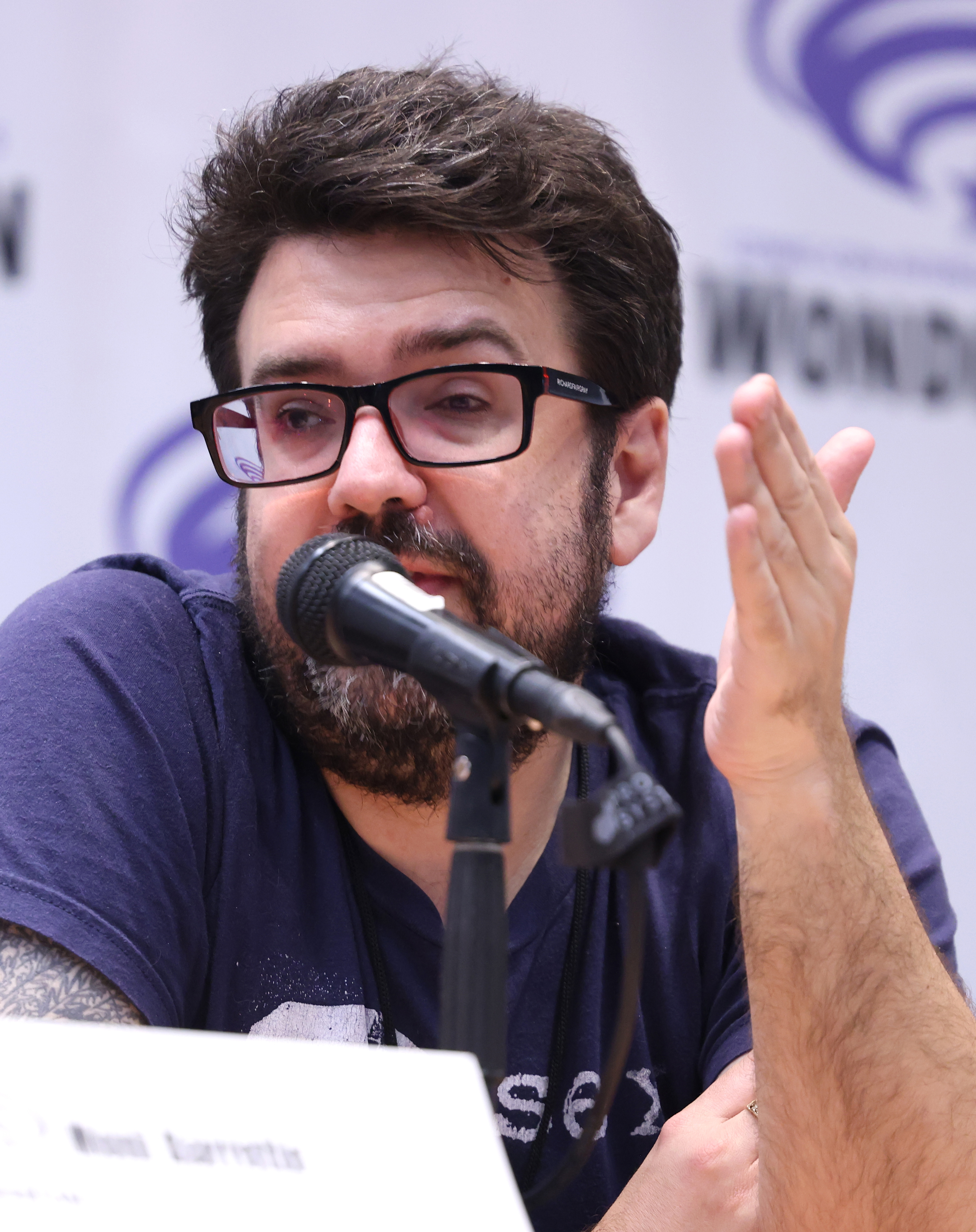
- Fairgray in 2025
- Born: 19 April 1985 (age 41); Auckland, New Zealand
- Occupations: Illustrator; Author
- Years active: 1992–present
- Website: richardfairgray.com

Richard Fairgray (born 1985) is a New Zealand–born author and illustrator, working primarily in comics and children's books. He draws and colors and animates his work, in spite of being legally blind, with 3% vision in one eye and none in the other.

== Career ==
Fairgray's works are best known in New Zealand and Australia where he has over 200 published titles. His comic series Blastosaurus (2008) became widely known in New Zealand when it was launched as the first locally produced monthly comic title. His picture books for children have been published all over the world by multiple publishers including Scholastic, Penguin/Random House and Sky Pony Press.

Fairgray was born in Auckland, New Zealand, and lived there until he was 31, with brief stints in Australia in his early 20s. His mother was a high school teacher. Fairgray learnt to read and write by the time he was 3 and immediately began making books in his spare time.

When Fairgray was seven he wrote his first comic book. Once again it featured a ghost being lonely and sad, but this time it was an original character – Ghost Ghost. Fairgray completed the book and had it photocopied at his school library, and sold at a school athletics day. Over the next decade Fairgray continued to produce comics, but rarely released any of them.

In 2001 Fairgray was part of the inaugural Class Comedians program as part of the NZ International Comedy Festival. Fairgray had never performed stand up before, but found his dry sense of humor and flat performance worked far better on stage than it did in person. He won one of the awards from the program and went on to perform stand up semi regularly through college, appearing occasionally on TV and being featured in a documentary focused on how terrible the quality of comedy had become in New Zealand.

It was through this that Fairgray was able to take his comic production to the next level, using his minor fame to get sponsorship and sell advertising in his books, allowing him to go suddenly from print runs of a few hundred to a few thousand. It was in 2002 that Fairgray first started selling his books at the Armageddon Expo.

Over the next 16 years Fairgray had booths at over 200 shows in New Zealand and Australia, as well as being a guest at San Diego Comic-Con and the London Film and Comic Con in 2010 and 2012 respectively.

Fairgray graduated in 2007, with a Bachelor of Fine Arts from the Elam School of Fine Arts and a Post Graduate Diploma in Secondary Teaching from the University of Auckland, he took the summer to direct a self funded feature film.

In 2010 Fairgray was flown to San Diego Comic-Con to launch Blastosaurus under the American Original imprint of Top Cow Comics, but the book was misprinted by the publisher. The mis-printed version was not released and Fairgray went home to relaunch the comic in New Zealand instead, through his company Square Planet Comics.

In 2012, Blastosaurus was relaunched in New Zealand, this time with Terry Jones contributing as a part-time co-writer. The title quickly gained a much larger audience, selling well through bookstores, comic stores, to libraries and schools, as well as through conventions and online.

Over the next five years, Blastosaurus remained the highest selling New Zealand comic, selling thousands of copies of every volume, as well as convention specials, activity books, spinoff comic strips and even a toy. By the time Fairgray left New Zealand and shut down his publishing efforts there, there were over 50 Blastosaurus titles available, none of which were still in their first printing.

In 2017, Fairgray moved to Los Angeles to pursue a career in comics outside of the tiny New Zealand market. Blastosaurus was picked up by Golden Apple Books, restarting the series from scratch with Fairgray's new collaborator, actor Paul Eiding. The series launched in March 2018 at WonderCon, then became a monthly series later in the year.

Fairgray is a gay man.

=== Four-Color Heroes ===
In 2023, Fairgray published the graphic novel Four-Color Heroes with Fanbase Press. The book is set in New Zealand in 2004 and follows two teen boys who fall in love while the Civil Union Act 2004 permitting same-sex unions in the country is passed. In addition to being published in English, it received a digital-only te reo Māori translation. Four-Color Heroes won the GLAAD Media Award for Outstanding Graphic Novel/Anthology.

== Selected works ==
- If I had an Elephant ISBN 9781775434764
- That's Not the Monster We Ordered ISBN 9780143770497
- My Grandpa is a Dinosaur (1960) ISBN 9780143507192
- Gorillas in Our Midst ISBN 978-1-63220-607-7
- Morgan, the Moreporks, and the Moon
- Morgan Goes to Nowhere
- Morgan Goes to Sleep
- Four-Color Heroes ISBN 0998797995

== Awards ==
- Storylines Notable Book Award, 2017, for Gorilla in Our Midst
- GLAAD Media Award for Outstanding Graphic Novel/Anthology, 2024, for Four-Color Heroes
