= Supergirl season 4 =

Supergirl
- Season 4
- Home media cover
- Showrunners: Jessica Queller; Robert Rovner
- Starring: Melissa Benoist; Mehcad Brooks; Chyler Leigh; Katie McGrath; Jesse Rath; Sam Witwer; Nicole Maines; April Parker Jones; David Harewood
- No. of episodes: 22

Release
- Original network: The CW
- Original release: October 14, 2018 – May 19, 2019

Season chronology
- ← Previous; Season 3 Next → Season 5

The fourth season of the American television series Supergirl, which is based on the DC Comics character Kara Zor-El / Supergirl, premiered on The CW on October 14, 2018. The season follows Kara, a reporter and superpowered alien who fights against those who threaten Earth. It is set in the Arrowverse, sharing continuity with the other television series of the universe. The season is produced by Berlanti Productions, Warner Bros. Television, and DC Entertainment, with Robert Rovner and Jessica Queller serving as showrunners.

The season was ordered in April 2018. Production began that July and concluded in April 2019. Melissa Benoist stars as Kara, with principal cast members Mehcad Brooks, Chyler Leigh, David Harewood, and Katie McGrath also returning from previous seasons, while Jesse Rath was promoted to the principal cast from his recurring status in season three. They are joined by new cast members Sam Witwer, Nicole Maines, and April Parker Jones. Former series regular Calista Flockhart makes an uncredited guest appearance in the third episode. The series was renewed for a fifth season on January 31, 2019.

== Episodes ==
Supergirl, season 4 episodes
No. overall	No. in season	Title	Directed by	Written by	Original release date	Prod. code	U.S. viewers (millions)
66	1	"American Alien"	Jesse Warn	Story by : Robert Rovner & Jessica Queller; Teleplay by : Gabriel Llanas & Aadrita Mukerji	October 14, 2018	T13.21201	1.52
Kara has stayed busy in her heroic duties working with the D.E.O., and as a reporter at CatCo proving she can multitask. Brother and sister Otis and Mercy Graves attack an alien, Dr. Vose, and steal an EMP device from his lab. J'onn believes it to be a hate crime, with the recent rise in anti-alien hatred in the country, although Kara disagrees. The duo plan to attack President Marsdin's summit to mark the anniversary of her amnesty act. Supergirl saves the President and captures Otis, but Mercy escapes. Camera footage of the attack ends up exposing the President's true identity as an alien. Meanwhile, Alex and Brainy struggle to communicate with each other at the D.E.O. The Graves are working with a mysterious masked individual who says he is an "agent of liberty" as he stabs Fiona Byrne, an alien telepath that J'onn had met in a support group for other aliens. The duplicate Kara is seen punching through walls in a cavern surrounded by Kasnian soldiers.
67	2	"Fallout"	Harry Jierjian	Story by : Dana Horgan; Teleplay by : Maria Maggenti & Daniel Beaty	October 21, 2018	T13.21202	1.34
In the wake of President Marsdin's outing as an alien, a wave of anti-alien sentiment spreads across the country. Marsdin resigns, leaving Vice President Baker to replace her. Mercy hacks L-Corps' image inducers to disable them, in an effort to force aliens out of hiding. When Brainy is outed to a pizzeria, he is rattled by the hatred he faces. J'onn continues to investigate his friend's disappearance and the trail leads him to Agent Liberty, who holds an anti-alien rally. At L-Corp, Mercy and Lena fight, each using an arm piece of Lex's exoskeleton. Mercy is captured by Supergirl and held at the D.E.O. with Otis. Nia, who reveals herself to be transgender, convinces James to write an editorial against anti-alien hatred. Mercy and Otis convince an agent, Jensen, to release them. Using Lena's lead dispersion device, the three send Kryptonite into the atmosphere, which hits Supergirl mid-flight, making her pass out and fall to the ground.
68	3	"Man of Steel"	Jesse Warn	Rob Wright & Derek Simon	October 28, 2018	T13.21203	1.28
J'onn catches Kara before she crashes to the ground; he brings her to the D.E.O. and the Kryptonite in the atmosphere continues to weaken her. In an effort to keep her safe while a cure is found, Lena outfits Kara in a prototype armor that will help filter the Kryptonite out of her system. In a series of flashbacks, Ben Lockwood, a university professor, and his family suffer a series of personal tragedies that slowly turn him against aliens and lead him into the path of Mercy Graves, who gives him the Agent Liberty armor. Back in the present, Ben prevents Mercy and Otis from killing Jensen by blackmailing the young agent into breaking them into D.E.O. headquarters.
69	4	"Ahimsa"	Armen V. Kevorkian	Story by : Eric Carrasco; Teleplay by : Katie Rose Rogers & Jess Kardos	November 4, 2018	T13.21204	1.23
With the air still Kryptonite-saturated, Kara is not permitted to leave the D.E.O. and fight as it may damage the suit and kill her. Lena and Brainy devise a method to filter the Kryptonite out of the atmosphere. A second D.E.O. agent turns rogue and breaks two aliens out. Mercy kills him after he brings the aliens to her. J'onn meets Manchester Black, Fiona's fiancé. Ben hypnotizes the aliens, using Fiona's empathic powers, into committing chaos, to give justification for killing aliens. As they attack a carnival, Supergirl fights until her suit is damaged. J'onn and Manchester join the fight and find Fiona, forcing Jensen to deactivate the alien device, breaking the hypnosis on the aliens. Mercy and Otis corner Alex and Supergirl where Otis threatens to expose Supergirl to the Kryptonite-filled air. One of the aliens kills Mercy and Otis as the air is completely cleared of Kryptonite. J'onn is only able to ease Fiona's pain before she dies. Later, Ben transfers a parasite into Jensen, and Manchester purchases lethal weaponry. President Baker assigns Colonel Lauren Haley to be Alex's commanding officer at the D.E.O.
70	5	"Parasite Lost"	David McWhirter	Maria Maggenti & Aadrita Mukerji	November 11, 2018	T13.21205	1.16
The parasite enables Jensen to absorb an alien's powers through touch, while also killing them. Jensen uses his powers in public and weakens Supergirl enough to escape. Kara and Nia interview a healer alien, Amadei, to counter the anti-alien rhetoric. Amadei is then attacked and left to die without his healing amulet. J'onn and Kara discover the amulet was stolen for the Children of Liberty, to stop Jensen's new powers from killing him. Colonel Haley obtains uranium to use against Jensen and the D.E.O. sets up a containment dome to limit the blast radius. James and Lena meet Ben Lockwood at a media summit, where James asserts that Guardian does not stand for Ben's anti-alien sentiments. Alex convinces Jensen to remove Amadei's amulet, leading to him becoming brain-dead. James believes that if he understands the anti-alien movement, he can get those people to listen, so he contacts Ben.
71	6	"Call to Action"	Antonio Negret	Gabriel Llanas & Daniel Beaty	November 18, 2018	T13.21206	1.13
Masked citizens calling themselves the Children of Liberty patrol the streets, attacking innocent aliens. Supergirl and Manchester intervene and chase them off. Anti-alien manifestos entitled "Twilight's Last Gleaming" rain down on them. Manchester has Children of Liberty member Petrocelli held captive to torture him for information. Haley reprimands Supergirl for intervening in the attack and refuses to use D.E.O. resources to investigate the manifesto. Lena and Eve are frustrated that their experimental trials with the Harun-El rock are not successful. Kara replaces James on a television show where she ends up debating Ben Lockwood, who gets the best of her. James meets Tom, a Children of Liberty member, and they patrol neighborhoods with a dog that can detect aliens hiding. Then the group starts putting together the clues: the alien-sensing dog allowed the Children of Liberty to identify alien houses, and the special lenses that Manchester discovered in Petrocelli's mask will allow the Children to see the infrared marks. At CatCo, Nia's narcolepsy alarms Kara and James. Brainy removes the infrared marks and defeats a group of Children and Kara saves an alien family from Children.
72	7	"Rather the Fallen Angel"	Chad Lowe	Dana Horgan & Katie Rose Rogers	November 25, 2018	T13.21207	1.15
Supergirl is lured by Manchester to Shelley Island, an alien immigration center and monument site where their powers are dampened, where the Children of Liberty detain her and lock her inside the monument and set it to detonate. Manchester previously made a deal with the Children to meet Agent Liberty, but the one he meets is not Ben. James investigates the area, and is almost convinced by the Children to detonate the monument. Kara, whose powers are only partially drained, manages to attract his attention with her heat vision. Manchester, realizing the Children were playing him, destroys the power dampeners, allowing her to escape while Manchester and James fight off the Children. Meanwhile, Lena proceeds with her experiments to enhance humans in an effort to "level the playing field" between humanity and super-beings. She takes on a volunteer, Adam, who dies during the trial, after bonding with Lena through their shared motivational grief. James, unaware of the experiments, goes to make up with Lena. Kara, Alex and Brainy are visited by J'onn who is upset about not being able to stop Manchester from killing people.
73	8	"Bunker Hill"	Kevin Smith	Rob Wright & Eric Carrasco	December 2, 2018	T13.21208	1.26
Nia wakes up suddenly from a dream involving Agent Liberty. Kara and J'onn look through Manchester's apartment and find his brass knuckle, which J'onn used to communicate with him telepathically in a desperate attempt to dissuade of his current course of action. Kara and Brainy help Nia with her dreams which lead to the old Lockwood Factory, where Manchester Black had pursued Ben as Agent Liberty to after exposing his secret to his wife. Kara stops Manchester Black from killing Ben's wife and sends Ben and Manchester to prison where the latter is visited by J'onn. Later, President Baker demands Supergirl to reveal her secret identity to him to improve his poll ratings. She refuses, so Baker fires her from the D.E.O. She later observes Ben as he is being remanded to prison, where his wife incites a crowd of protestors in support of her husband as Ben remarks that he's far from finished.
74	9	"Elseworlds, Part 3"	Jesse Warn	Story by : Marc Guggenheim; Teleplay by : Derek Simon & Robert Rovner	December 11, 2018	T13.21209	2.17
Barry Allen and Oliver Queen wake up as wanted criminals hunted by John Deegan as a black suited Superman while Kara is imprisoned at S.T.A.R. Labs, with a rewritten Alex guarding her. After narrowly escaping Deegan, Barry and Oliver locate Cisco Ramon, who works as a mob boss with James as a henchman, and retrieve Superman from Earth-38. Supergirl convinces Alex to release her, and together with Barry retrieves the Book of Destiny. Superman uses the book to return Barry and Oliver to their original forms, but Deegan steals it back. Barry and Kara travel in opposite directions to slow the Earth's rotation in order to impede Deegan, despite Clark saying it will kill them. With help from Lois, Brainy, and J'onn, Superman and Oliver successfully defeat Deegan and restore Earth-1 to normal. On Earth-38, Clark reveals Lois is pregnant, and they are going to be moving to Argo City for a while, leaving Earth in Kara's hands. Clark proposes to Lois and she accepts. On Earth-1, Oliver gets a call from Batwoman, revealing Deegan is in Arkham and has seemingly made friends with the Psycho-Pirate, who teases a future crisis. Note: This episode concludes a crossover event that begins on The Flash season 5 episode 9 and continues on Arrow season 7 episode 9.
75	10	"Suspicious Minds"	Rachel Talalay	Maria Maggenti & Gabriel Llanas	January 20, 2019	T13.21210	1.04
Kara finds a boat where a man named Randall McAllister is killed and dragged into the ocean by a slightly visible alien. Colonel Haley dismisses Kara from the crime scene because of her continued refusal to reveal her identity. All the D.E.O. agents who know Supergirl's identity, including Alex, agree to resist Haley's interrogations. Kara, Alex and J'onn learn that the attackers were Morai, a trio of aliens with the ability to turn invisible with only Kara being able to see them. One Morai kills itself to avoid Haley, who, alongside McAllister, tortured them to be weapons. Two more Morai infiltrate the D.E.O., and Brainy marks them with a paintball gun so the agents can see them. Haley re-enables the use of lethal weaponry, killing one of the Morai. Haley and Alex are saved by Supergirl from the last Morai. Haley realizes that Supergirl is Kara, and tries to blackmail her back into the D.E.O. before Alex incapacitates her. J'onn wipes Haley's mind of Supergirl's identity, but Haley remains determined to discover it, bringing in an alien truth-seeking creature to ferret out the secret. To keep Kara's identity safe, Alex has J'onn wipe everyone's memory of Supergirl's identity including her own.
76	11	"Blood Memory"	Shannon Kohli	Jessica Queller & Dana Horgan	January 27, 2019	T13.21211	1.34
The Supergirl clone falls into a coma. The Russians try to revive her, but sends purple lightning around the globe; causing illegal tablets to glow purple. People taking the purple drugs temporarily transform into unstoppable monsters, catching the D.E.O.'s attention. While chasing these monsters, Kara has a disconnect with Alex due to her no longer remembering her secret identity. Alex feels that something inside her is missing, so she asks J'onn to take a look. J'onn and Brainy agree to place a placebo in Alex's mind to cover the truth. Meanwhile, Nia reveals to Kara that she is transgender and that she has ill confidence about her family when due to developing the unwanted Dreamer powers that occur to one female in every generation in her family. Nia's sister (who was taught dream interpretation while expecting to gain the powers) discovers Nia has the powers and regretfully renounces her. Kara reveals her identity to Nia to reassure her. While Nia's mother lies dying of a spider bite, Nia uses her powers to talk to her mother about them, who assures her she'll be able to continue the dreamer line.
77	12	"Menagerie"	Stefan Pleszczynski	Story by : Robert Rovner; Teleplay by : Daniel Beaty & Greg Baldwin	February 17, 2019	T13.21212	1.15
After a meteor crash lands, Pamela Ferrer, a thief, and her boyfriend are caught in a car crash. A symbiotic, snake-like alien parasite known as Menagerie inhabits Pamela's body. Meanwhile, Brainy requests Nia to train with him but refuses as she is still grieving her mother, although she decides to invite Brainy to a Valentine's Day party. Alex decides to give advice for Brainy. Lena decides to share her research with the government, causing James to break up with her as that could be weaponized. Ben convinces his son to lead the Children of Liberty. After, the D.E.O. track down Pamela who attacks the Valentine's Day party. Following a confrontation with Kara, Nia and the Children of Liberty, the parasite is (apparently) killed. Pamela is arrested and put in prison where she gets a message from Manchester Black. President Baker realizes crimes are only considered terrorist attacks if they are against humans, not aliens, forcing him to release Ben from prison. It is revealed that the symbiote is still alive.
78	13	"What's So Funny About Truth, Justice, and the American Way?"	Alexis Ostrander	Eric Carrasco & Aadrita Mukerji	March 3, 2019	T13.21213	1.14
Manchester breaks out of prison with Hat and Menagerie who together form "The Elite," along with a Morai. Hat is revealed to be an alien whose Bowler hat has fifth-dimension properties. Meanwhile, Brainy trains Nia at the Fortress of Solitude. Supergirl confronts President Baker to convince him to prevent a missile launch carrying a satellite which would destroy any alien ship coming to Earth, but he refuses. Later, Supergirl, Nia, Brainy, Alex, and J'onn stop The Elite, while Supergirl learns that the Claymore satellite has been reprogrammed to destroy The White House. She redirects the satellite so that it fires at a body of water and then destroys it. However, Manchester manages to flee with the Legion ring he stole from Brainy during their confrontation. Ben is offered to be Director of Alien Affairs by the President. At the same time, Alex begins distrusting Baker after Haley confirms that the President took action against protocol; to this end, she offers Lena anything she needs for her research. After being visited by Supergirl following the incident, Baker makes Ben the Director of Alien Affairs but denies his request to deputize the Children of Liberty.
79	14	"Stand and Deliver"	Andi Armaganian	Rob Wright & Jess Kardos	March 10, 2019	T13.21214	1.05
Ben starts a revolution against aliens, attempting to repeal the Alien Amnesty Act, which gets The Elite's attention and they decide to help the aliens resist against the humans. However the revolution eventually fails when aliens and humans begin to bond. Supergirl, Nia and J'onn defeat the Morai, The Hat and Menagerie. J'onn fails to stop Manchester so he decides to begin a manhunt. At Cat Co, James gets shot by an unknown figure.
80	15	"O Brother, Where Art Thou?"	Tawnia McKiernan	Derek Simon & Nicki Holcomb	March 17, 2019	T13.21215	1.07
Four years ago, Lena's brother Lex created a red sky over Metropolis to take down Superman, but was caught and sent to prison. In the present, Lex is released due to a disease, so Lena helps him by working on a cure. Meanwhile, J'onn and Kara continue investigating Manchester, who confronts the two by using the Martian Staff of Kolar, which triggers J'onn's traumatic memories. Lena decides to use the cure on a temporarily dead James. Though his sister Kelly tries to stop her, Alex convinces Kelly to stop. Just before Lena's able to, Manchester causes a power outage across the city, so Kara and J'onn confront him again. J'onn kills Manchester while Kara stops the city from being flooded. The following day, Lena reveals that Lex cut off the backup power, and he also admits that Otis (thought dead) shot James on Lex's orders all so that Lena would have no choice but to test the cure on him. It is also revealed that Eve was working with Lex and Otis this whole time. Otis chloroforms Lena, leaving Eve to look after her. Lex escapes with Otis, but is stopped by Supergirl.
81	16	"The House of L"	Carl Seaton	Dana Horgan & Eric Carrasco	March 24, 2019	T13.21216	1.12
Three years ago, Lex was put on trial for mass murder but before going to prison he is visited by Eve (revealed to be a fangirl of Lex), who is hired by Lex to go undercover to spy on James. Nine months ago, the Kaznians found a stray, amnesiac copy of Supergirl, who was created from Harun-El, and informed Lex about this four months later. Since then, the Kaznians have been training the Supergirl copy while Lex raised and manipulated her for his own uses, teaching her a biased history about her rival, the original Supergirl. It is also revealed that Lex planned for Lena to test the cure in order to save the Supergirl copy from a sudden illness that rendered her comatose due to her being created from Harun-El. Lex gives the cure to the Supergirl copy whom he names Red Daughter. In the present, Lex is revealed to possess metahuman powers, which he uses to escape from Supergirl.
82	17	"All About Eve"	Ben Bray	Story by : Gabriel Llanas; Teleplay by : Katie Rose Rogers & Brooke Pohl	March 31, 2019	T13.21217	1.06
Supergirl teams up with Alex and Lena to track down Eve. They find her cousin Bitsie, whom they learn was given the cure to eradicate her cancer; persuaded to help, Bitsie reveals the location of Eve's old lab. It is revealed that Eve shot James and used the Kryptonite heart used for Metallo to resurrect Otis. Supergirl finds Black Kryptonite in the vault, with Lena explaining she created it and it has been the basis of her medical research. Supergirl reveals her concerns about people like Lex gaining powers and her not being able to stop them. J'onn leaves the planet after seeing a vision of his father. During a press conference at the White House, in which the Alien Amnesty Act is officially repealed, Red Daughter attacks disguised as Supergirl to turn public opinion against the latter. President Baker declares martial law against Supergirl, who is now public enemy number one, though Alex, Lena and Haley all believe she is innocent. While attending the press conference, James is left unable to move out of fear, so he turns to his sister for therapy.
83	18	"Crime and Punishment"	Antonio Negret	Story by : Rob Wright; Teleplay by : Lindsay Sturman & Aadrita Mukerji	April 21, 2019	T13.21218	0.99
Red Daughter attacks the White House disguised as Supergirl, but James, Nia, Alex, Lena, Brainy, and Haley are not fooled. Ben demands the use of the DEO's alien weapons to arrest Supergirl. Brainy realizes Ben will come for the alien registry next, so he downloads a copy of it before deleting the original. A reluctant Haley agrees to Ben's request, and borrows Alex's signal watch. Alex lies about how to summon Supergirl. Despite seeing through it, she presses it so that Supergirl does not show up, so Ben makes off with the weapons. Baker grants Ben's previous request to deputize the Children of Liberty. James has another PTSD episode but the psychiatrist's anti-PTSD advice has little effect due to his powers surfacing. Supergirl and Lena visit Stryker's island for information and discover Lex's hidden room. Otis, now an advanced Metallo, attacks Supergirl and starts a prison riot before self-destructing in the secret room. Eve secretly works on rebuilding Otis. Steve Lomeli, Lex's cell neighbor, gives her a flash drive on the room. Supergirl is framed for the riot, so Kara decides to stop being Supergirl for a while, claiming to Alex and Lena she is "going into hiding."
84	19	"American Dreamer"	David Harewood	Story by : Dana Horgan; Teleplay by : Daniel Beaty & Jess Kardos	April 28, 2019	T13.21219	1.14
With Kara ceasing to operate as Supergirl, Dreamer takes her place as National City's superhero. Ben returns to his duties as Agent Liberty. Now deputized, he and the Children of Liberty begin arresting innocent aliens. His son realizes his best friend is an alien, having kept this a secret because of Ben's policies, which makes him reconsider his parents' anti-alien propaganda. Brainy and Kelly try to discover the source of James's PTSD, discovering that panic attacks make his powers develop faster; his powers are revealed to be identical to Kryptonians. Kara works to clear Supergirl's name, as she and Lena discover Lex's link to Kaznia, as well as a company called AmerTek. An alien whose husband was arrested by the Children of Liberty kills Ben's wife. J'onn completes his mission on Mars.
85	20	"Will the Real Miss Tessmacher Please Stand Up?"	Shannon Kohli	Story by : Derek Simon; Teleplay by : Katie Rose Rogers & Natalie Abrams	May 5, 2019	T13.21220	1.05
James tests his powers in the Fortress of Solitude. Lena and Kara go to Kaznia for information on Lex and discover Red Daughter's existence as well as her role in Lex's plot to invade America. Eve creates clones of herself to throw the duo off and sets off the facility's self destruct. Kara discovers and burns Red Daughter's room and realizes Lex knows that she is Supergirl. She and Lena defeat the Eve clones and escape; having collected evidence of the impending invasion. The D.E.O. tracks down Ben's wife's murderer. Ben orders all aliens at that location to be arrested, but his soldiers are convinced to disobey orders by Brainy. Ben takes the super serum to arrest them himself, but he is subdued by a returning J'onn. Ben is denounced by his son because of his anti-alien rhetoric. Kara meets Baker in his office to warn him about Lex's plot, but he has her black-bagged, revealing he is in on the plot.
86	21	"Red Dawn"	Alexis Ostrander	Story by : Lindsay Sturman; Teleplay by : Gabriel Llanas & Eric Carrasco	May 12, 2019	T13.21221	1.11
Baker has had the CatCo servers wiped, terminating Kara's evidence. Kara escapes an execution at the hands of Red Daughter. Lena interrogates Ben about Lex's plan, but he is unaware of it. Ben's hair begins to fall out as he has taken an untested Harun-El. J'onn, Brainy, and Nia infiltrate an AmerTek factory to save the aliens there, but are captured. One of the agents strikes Brainy in the forehead, inadvertently causing him to behave like his ancestors while rebooting. He escapes and betrays J'onn and Nia, getting them deported with the other aliens. Ben finds Otis, who unknowingly reveals that Lex plans to betray Kaznia before getting killed by him. Lena places a baby truth creature around Lillian's arm and is convinced by her to add more Harun-El to James after he becomes traumatized. Red Daughter appears at Alex's home, disguised as Kara, before Supergirl arrives and fights her. Alex remembers again that Kara is Supergirl. Red Daughter nearly kills Kara, but Lex apparently kills Red Daughter on television. Baker lies that he killed Supergirl, framing her as the mastermind behind the Kaznia invasion. Haley calls Alex to inform her about the true purpose of the Claymore satellite: it has enough energy to power a Lexosuit.
87	22	"The Quest for Peace"	Jesse Warn	Story by : Robert Rovner & Jessica Queller; Teleplay by : Rob Wright & Derek Simon	May 19, 2019	T13.21222	1.07
Lex has framed himself as a hero for stopping his self-initiated Kaznian invasion. J'onn and Nia are sent to Shelley Island, where enslaved aliens are setting up a Claymore satellite on Lex's orders to destroy Argo, where Superman is. When Lex and Baker find out Ben killed Otis, they make it seem like he is responsible for Lex's crimes. Ben watches as Baker makes Lex the new Director of Alien Affairs. Kara recovers her evidence from Brainy and publicly exposes Lex and Baker. J'onn and Nia escape and overload the satellite, while Brainy returns to his normal-self. Kara, Alex and James arrive at Shelley Island and fight Lex and Ben. James and Ben remove the Harun-El from each other, while Red Daughter, who was held captive on the island, sacrifices herself to save Kara. She fuses with Kara, who uses her newfound powers to destroy the Lexosuit. Lex teleports away, but is ambushed by Lena, who removes the Harun-El from him, before shooting him. However, before dying, Lex reveals to Lena that Kara is Supergirl in an attempt to embitter her, which succeeds. Ben and Baker are arrested, while the Vice President re-initiates the Alien Amnesty Act. Kelly and Alex reveal their feelings for each other. Eve tries to escape, but is intercepted by a representative of Leviathan, who refuses to let her go despite Lex's failure, revealing they forced her to work for Lex. Elsewhere, The Monitor releases J'onn's brother on Earth before retrieving Lex's corpse.

== Cast and characters ==
=== Main ===
- Melissa Benoist as Kara Danvers / Kara Zor-El / Supergirl and Red Daughter
- Mehcad Brooks as James Olsen / Guardian
- Chyler Leigh as Alex Danvers
- Katie McGrath as Lena Luthor
- Jesse Rath as Querl "Brainy" Dox / Brainiac 5
- Sam Witwer as Ben Lockwood / Agent Liberty
- Nicole Maines as Nia Nal / Dreamer
- April Parker Jones as Lauren Haley
- David Harewood as J'onn J'onzz / Martian Manhunter

=== Recurring ===
- Rhona Mitra as Mercy Graves
- Robert Baker as Otis Graves
- Anthony Konechny as Raymond Jensen / Parasite
- Bruce Boxleitner as Phil Baker
- Andrea Brooks as Eve Teschmacher
- Sarah Smyth as Lydia Lockwood
- Graham Verchere as George Lockwood
- David Ajala as Manchester Black
- Jessica Meraz as Pamela Ferrer / Menagerie
- Azie Tesfai as Kelly Olsen
- Jon Cryer as Lex Luthor

=== Guest ===
- Lynda Carter as U.S. President Olivia Marsdin
- Brenda Strong as Lillian Luthor
- Tiya Sircar as Fiona Byrne
- Vincent Gale as Dr. Rohan Vose
- Cardi Wong as Kesse Kay
- Fulvio Cecere as Massimo
- Xander Berkeley as Peter Lockwood
- Abby Ross as Alien student
- Justice Leak as Hellgrammite
- Adam Levy as Amadei Derros
- Michelle Krusiec as Natalie Hawkings
- Shannon Chan-Kent as Elizabeth Hawkings
- Kwesi Ameyaw as Cassian
- Helen Slater as Eliza Danvers
- Steve Byers as Tom
- Michael Johnston as Adam
- Roxy Wood as Yvette
- Russell Wong as General Alfonso Tan
- Hannah James as Maeve Nal
- Kate Burton as Isabel Nal
- Brennan Mejia as Jerry
- Lukas Gage as Kevin Huggins
- Garwin Sanford as Paul Nal
- Brian Cyburt (Note: Credited on-screen as "Brian Cybert" erroneously.) as Spencer
- Françoise Robertson as Sarah Walker
- Louis Ozawa Changchien as Hat
- Michael Adamthwaite as Cooper
- Jonathan Bennett as Quentin
- William MacDonald as Dr. Kaplan
- Gabriel Gurevich as Mikhail
- Carl Lumbly as M'yrnn J'onzz
- Jill Morrison as Bitsie Teschmacher
- Karin Konoval as Senator Granberry
- Parveen Dosanjh as Dr. Park
- Willie Garson as Steve Lomeli
- Emily Tennant as Edna
- Patti Allan as Margot Morrison
- Phil LaMarr voices Malefic J'onzz

==== "Elseworlds" ====
- John Wesley Shipp as Barry Allen / Flash of Earth-90
- LaMonica Garrett as Mar Novu / The Monitor
- Stephen Amell as Oliver Queen / Green Arrow
- David Ramsey as John Diggle
- Carlos Valdes as Cisco Ramon
- Danielle Panabaker as Caitlin Snow and Killer Frost
- Tyler Hoechlin as Kal-El / Clark Kent / Superman (Earth-38) and John Deegan / Superman
- Grant Gustin as Barry Allen / Flash
- Jeremy Davies as John Deegan
- Ruby Rose as Kate Kane / Batwoman
- Cassandra Jean Amell as Nora Fries
- Adam Tsekhman as Gary Green
- Bob Frazer as Roger Hayden / Psycho-Pirate
- Elizabeth Tulloch as Lois Lane

== Production ==
=== Development ===
At the Television Critics Association press tour in January 2018, The CW president Mark Pedowitz said he was "optimistic" and "confident" about Supergirl and the other Arrowverse shows returning next season, but added that it was too soon to announce anything just yet. On April 2, The CW renewed the series for its fourth season. Robert Rovner and Jessica Queller returned to serve as the season's showrunners without their former co-showrunner Andrew Kreisberg, who was fired during the previous season.

=== Writing ===
Following the conclusion of the third season, which closed with a second Kara Danvers born from the aura that escaped during the final battle with Reign being found by Russian soldiers in Siberia, Robert Rovner and Jessica Queller confirmed that the fourth season would be inspired by the Superman: Red Son comic book mini-series. Queller described the adaptation as "an homage" to the series, which portrays what would have happened if Superman had landed in Russia and became a hero there instead of in America. The story intended to examine the nature-versus-nurture debate, and developed as a "slow-burn" throughout the season.

At San Diego Comic-Con 2018, Rovner and Queller stated that the season would aim to be more "grounded" than previous seasons in order to touch on topical real-world issues. They confirmed that the fourth season would look to refocus on Kara's professional career as a reporter and see her act as a mentor to Cat Grant's former protégé, both at CatCo and as a superhero, paralleling Kara's own journey of coming into her own. The duo added that "This is the season where Kara becomes as much a hero as Supergirl." Teasing the main villain of the season, the producers described Agent Liberty as the leader of "a hate group that supports a human-first world order" and under the guise of a family man, provokes "anti-alien sentiment in the country, echoing the hateful rhetoric we're seeing right now in certain American politics."

Rovner and Queller also announced that the theme of the season would be "What is stronger: hope or fear?" Melissa Benoist commented that, "I think their main premise is that fear itself is a villain, and can hope conquer it? Supergirl stands for hope, so we'll see." Queller concurred, adding that the season would investigate, "How can [Supergirl] be a beacon of hope when she represents what people are afraid of?"

=== Casting ===
Main cast members Melissa Benoist, Mehcad Brooks, Chyler Leigh, David Harewood, and Katie McGrath return from previous seasons as Kara Danvers / Kara Zor-El / Supergirl, James Olsen / Guardian, Alex Danvers, J'onn J'onzz / Martian Manhunter, and Lena Luthor, respectively. Benoist also portrays Red Daughter, the clone of Kara. The fourth season is the first not to feature original cast member Jeremy Jordan, who plays Winn Schott. While it was initially announced that he would shift into a recurring capacity for the fourth season, Rovner later said he would not appear until the fifth season. Chris Wood and Odette Annable, who became regulars in the second and third seasons, respectively, too did not reprise their roles as Mon-El and Samantha Arias / Reign, respectively, as regulars in the fourth season. Jesse Rath was promoted to a series regular after previously recurring in the third season as Querl Dox / Brainiac 5. Sam Witwer joined the main cast as Agent Liberty. Nicole Maines and April Parker Jones had been cast as series regulars and would portray Nia Nal / Dreamer and Colonel Lauren Haley, respectively, with the former being the first transgender superhero on television.

Brent Spiner was originally cast as Vice President Baker in August, but the role was recast later that month with Bruce Boxleitner due to Spiner having "family issues conflicting with the show's production dates". Lex Luthor, Lena's half-brother and the archnemesis of Kara's cousin Superman, was introduced in this season; Jon Cryer, who portrayed Lex's nephew Lenny Luthor in the film Superman IV: The Quest for Peace, was cast in the role.

=== Filming ===
Production for the season began on July 11, 2018, in Vancouver, British Columbia, and concluded in April 2019. Melissa Benoist joined filming following the conclusion of her run on Broadway as the star of Beautiful: The Carole King Musical on August 4, 2018.

=== Arrowverse tie-ins ===
In May 2018, Arrow star Stephen Amell announced at The CW upfronts that the next Arrowverse crossover would feature Batwoman and Gotham City. The crossover "Elseworlds" was a pilot for a Batwoman solo series, which premiered in October 2019.

== Marketing ==
The main cast of the season as well as executive producers Robert Rovner, Jessica Queller, and Sarah Schechter attended San Diego Comic-Con on July 21, 2018, to promote the season.

== Release ==
=== Broadcast ===
In May 2018, it was announced that Supergirl, which had aired on Mondays since its debut, would move to Sundays for its fourth season due to the wrong date due programming expansion to Sunday nights. The season premiered on The CW in the United States on October 14, 2018. The annual crossover episode will swap time-slots with The Flash for that week and will air on Tuesday, December 11.

=== Home media ===
The season was released on DVD and Blu-ray on September 17, 2019, with special features including the show's 2018 Comic-Con panel, deleted scenes and a gag reel. The Blu-ray release also included all three episodes of the fifth annual Arrowverse crossover event titled "Elseworlds".

== Reception ==
=== Ratings ===
Viewership and ratings per episode of Supergirl season 4
No.	Title	Air date	Rating/share (18–49)	Viewers (millions)	DVR (18–49)	DVR viewers (millions)	Total (18–49)	Total viewers (millions)
1	"American Alien"	October 14, 2018	0.5/2	1.52	0.4	1.14	0.9	2.66
2	"Fallout"	October 21, 2018	0.4/2	1.34	0.4	1.04	0.8	2.38
3	"Man of Steel"	October 28, 2018	0.4/2	1.28	0.3	0.93	0.7	2.21
4	"Ahimsa"	November 4, 2018	0.4/2	1.23	0.3	0.97	0.7	2.20
5	"Parasite Lost"	November 11, 2018	0.3/1	1.16	0.4	0.97	0.7	2.13
6	"Call to Action"	November 18, 2018	0.3/1	1.13	0.4	0.99	0.7	2.12
7	"Rather the Fallen Angel"	November 25, 2018	0.3/1	1.15	0.4	0.95	0.7	2.10
8	"Bunker Hill"	December 2, 2018	0.4/2	1.26	0.3	1.00	0.7	2.26
9	"Elseworlds, Part 3"	December 11, 2018	0.8/3	2.17	0.5	1.36	1.3	3.53
10	"Suspicious Minds"	January 20, 2019	0.3/1	1.04	0.4	1.19	0.7	2.23
11	"Blood Memory"	January 27, 2019	0.3/1	1.34	0.4	1.02	0.7	2.36
12	"Menagerie"	February 17, 2019	0.3/1	1.15	0.4	1.05	0.7	2.20
13	"What's So Funny About Truth, Justice, and the American Way?"	March 3, 2019	0.4/2	1.14	0.3	0.94	0.7	2.08
14	"Stand and Deliver"	March 10, 2019	0.3/1	1.05	0.3	0.78	0.6	1.83
15	"O Brother, Where Art Thou?"	March 17, 2019	0.3/2	1.07	0.3	0.95	0.6	2.02
16	"The House of L"	March 24, 2019	0.3/1	1.12	0.3	0.81	0.6	1.93
17	"All About Eve"	March 31, 2019	0.3/2	1.06	0.3	0.81	0.6	1.87
18	"Crime and Punishment"	April 21, 2019	0.3/1	0.99	0.2	0.71	0.5	1.70
19	"American Dreamer"	April 28, 2019	0.3/1	1.14	0.2	0.73	0.5	1.87
20	"Will the Real Miss Tessmacher Please Stand Up?"	May 5, 2019	0.3/1	1.05	0.2	0.71	0.5	1.76
21	"Red Dawn"	May 12, 2019	0.3/1	1.11	0.3	0.76	0.6	1.87
22	"The Quest for Peace"	May 19, 2019	0.3/1	1.07	0.3	0.80	0.6	1.87

=== Critical response ===
The review aggregation website Rotten Tomatoes reports an 88% approval rating for the fourth season, with an average rating of 7.26/10 based on 188 reviews. The website's critic consensus reads: "Though it's a little tonally inconsistent, Supergirl's fourth season still soars thanks to strong, relevant writing brought to life by its charming cast."

Reviewing for Den of Geek, Delia Harrington gave the premiere a rating of 4/5, writing: "The Supergirl season 4 opener sows the seeds of a season's worth of conflict while being a great episode in its own right." IGN's Jesse Schedeen said of the premiere that, "After a disappointing finish to a generally underwhelming Season 3, it's good to see Supergirl quickly bouncing back this week. 'American Alien' sets the stage for a promising conflict to come, introducing memorable new villains and supporting characters and forcing Kara to confront the things she can't control in her city. Supergirl is borrowing several pages from the X-Men playbook, and that's by no means a bad thing." He gave the episode a rating of 8.6/10, concluding that, "Supergirl's fourth season is off to a promising start thanks to an eventful and dramatic premiere episode." Overall, he gave 9/10 points to the whole season, stating that "Supergirl's fourth season is undoubtedly the strongest to date, thanks in large part to the concerted effort to make up for the lack of compelling, nuanced villains in year's past. The finale episode ties all those threads together in a satisfying way, wrapping up the shared saga of Red Daughter, Agent Liberty and Lex Luthor while also setting up Lena Luthor to become Kara's greatest and most personal enemy yet." Caroline Siede of The A.V. Club concurred with Schedeen's X-Men comparison, reflecting that over the seasons, "[Supergirl] has grown both more explicit and more nuanced in its handling of social and political issues." Siede gave the premiere a "B+" grade, explaining, "I'm tempering my optimism with just a little bit of caution. [...] Supergirl still has plenty of room to grow, but it's nice to see the show get its core ethos so right."

The book Adapting Superman: Essays on the Transmedia Man of Steel includes the chapter "Forging Kryptonite: Lex Luthor's Xenophobia as Societal Fracturing, from Batman v Superman to Supergirl," which analyzes Lex Luthor's actions in Season 4 "as a representation exploring the cultural effects of encroaching xenophobia" from society to the family in the years following the 2016 United States presidential election.

=== Accolades ===
Award nominations for Supergirl, season 4
Year	Award	Category	Nominee(s)	Result	Ref.
2019	Leo Awards	Best Sound in a Dramatic Series	Kyle Petty ("Man of Steel")	Nominated	
2019	Leo Awards	Best Visual Effects in a Dramatic Series	Gevork Babityan, Kris Cabrera, Armen V. Kevorkian, Mike Leeming, Brian Reiss ("Call to Action")	Nominated	
2019	Teen Choice Awards	Choice TV Show: Action	Supergirl	Nominated	
2019	Teen Choice Awards	Choice TV Actress: Action	Melissa Benoist	Nominated	
2019	Teen Choice Awards	Choice TV Villain	Jon Cryer	Nominated	
