= Galaxy: The Prettiest Star =

2022 graphic novel by Jadzia Axelrod and Vash Taylor

- Author: Jadzia Axelrod
- Illustrator: Vash Taylor
- Language: English
- Genre: Graphic novel
- Publisher: DC Comics
- Publication date: May 17, 2022
- Publication place: United States
- Pages: 176
- ISBN: 978-1-7795-0875-1

Galaxy: The Prettiest Star is a graphic novel written by Jadzia Axelrod and illustrated by Vash Taylor. The novel was published by DC Comics on May 17, 2022. It tells the story of Galaxy, a teenage alien princess, who is forced to hide on Earth when her home planet is conquered. To hide herself from her enemies, Galaxy uses alien technology to present herself as a human boy. While wrestling with her identity, she falls in love with Kat, a human girl.

== Publication history ==
Galaxy: The Prettiest Star, created by writer Jadzia Axelrod and artist Vash Taylor, first appeared in a Special Edition #1 released on Free Comic Book Day 2022. Days later, the graphic novel arrived in stores on May 17. As of April 2023, the book's initial run was announced as "nearly sold out" by Axlerod herself, with DC meeting demand with a second print run.

The titular character, Galaxy, later became a supporting character for Axelrod's run on Hawkgirl. She is also a major character in Bad Dream: A Dreamer Story.

== Background ==
Jadzia Axelrod first pitched several ideas to DC Comics when she was approached by the company through her agent. According to Axelrod, they were looking for "writers who are familiar with the DC stable of characters, but who have an unusual point of view", and one of the concepts she pitched was about the character that would later become Galaxy.

DC Comics liked Axelrod's idea and had her work on a script with Sara Miller, their editor of young adult content. After the script was finalized, Miller showed it to Vash Taylor who "instantly fell in love" for it.

Axelrod's idea for Galaxy came from her desire to tell a story in which the character was not "metaphorically queer or metaphorically trans", but openly queer and transgender. Since she transitioned later in life, Axelrod had to research stories and narratives of trans teenagers.

== Reception ==
Publishers Weekly gave the novel a starred review, in which they call it a "vulnerable and thought-provoking graphic novel about gender identity". They also commented on Taylor's illustration, noting their use of "sharp lines and flowing, vivid colors" as matching the atmosphere of the story and its characters. The reviewer also praised Axelrod's writing when describing the experience of being transgender. Kirkus Reviews also praised the art, saying it "features expressive figures highlighted against abstract backgrounds" and ended by calling Galaxy a "fantastical allegory that lends itself well to the graphic novel medium".

Writing for Booklist, Peter Blenski says that, although the novel initially "follows a classic YA format", Galaxy's allegory "serves as a fresh and thoughtful spin on trans stories". Blenski noted the art added "some humor" to the novel, which helped during moments that deal with heavier themes, such as suicidal ideation. In a review published on Comic Book Resources, Ben Bishop talked about how using the power to shapeshift is now a common trope for stories about transgender people, but praised Axelrod's take on it, saying that "Galaxy is a completely different trans allegory and one which is far more accurate to the trans experience than similar stories".

The book was nominated for the 2023 GLAAD Media Award for Outstanding Graphic Novel/Anthology award at the 34th GLAAD Media Awards.

== Sequel ==
A sequel titled Galaxy Vol. 2: As The World Falls Down was announced in May 2025 and released in May 2026.
