= Jadzia Axelrod =

American comic book writer and illustrator

- Areas: Comic book writer, illustrator
- Notable works: Galaxy: The Prettiest Star, Hawkgirl

Jadzia Axelrod is an American comic book writer and illustrator, known for her graphic novel Galaxy: The Prettiest Star and her role as a writer on the DC Comics miniseries Hawkgirl.

== Early years ==
Axelrod developed a love for superhero stories at an early age, watching numerous episodes of the animated series Super Friends, based on DC Comics characters, during her childhood. In her 30s, she began her gender transition.

== Career ==
Axelrod became known in the American comics industry in 2022, when she launched her graphic novel Galaxy: The Prettiest Star in May of that same year, published by DC Comics. Due to good sales in one year the publisher ran out of stock, leading DC to launch a reprint in 2023.

In May 2023, in commemoration of LGBT Pride Month, Axelrod published the character encyclopedia The DC Book of Pride: A Celebration of DC's LGBTQIA+ Characters, an encyclopedia focused on the various LGBT characters of the DC Universe, including characters such as Alan Scott, Batwoman and Aruna Shende. That same month, she launched the 6-issue miniseries Hawkgirl, starring the superheroine of the same name. The series was drawn by Amancay Nahuelpan and concluded in its sixth issue in February 2024.

In May 2025, it was announced that a sequel to Axelrod's novel Galaxy: The Prettiest Star titled Galaxy: As The World Falls Down would be made, with Axelrod writing and artist Rye Hickman illustrating. The book is slated to release in May 2026. In July of that same year, it was announced at San Diego Comic-Con that Axelrod and Nicole Maines would write a Justice League Unlimited story centering around Galaxy, Dreamer, Adam Strange, Star Sapphire, and Green Arrow as they venture to Naltor, the home planet of Dreamer's mother.

Axelrod is also currently the host of the American podcast The Voice Of Free Planet X.

== Bibliography ==
- DC Pride (DC Comics, anthology, 2022)
- Galaxy: The Prettiest Star (DC Comics, 2022)
- The DC Book of Pride: A Celebration of DC's LGBTQIA+ Characters (DC Comics, enciclopedia, 2023)
- Hawkgirl #1-6 (DC Comics, 2023–2024)
