= Superman: Son of Kal-El =

American comic book series

- Cover of Superman: Son of Kal-El #1 (July 2021), by John Timms.

Publication information
- Publisher: DC Comics
- Schedule: Monthly
- Format: Ongoing series
- Genre: Superhero
- Publication date: July 2021 – December 2022
- No. of issues: 18 issues and 1 Annual
- Main character: Jon Kent / Superman

Creative team
- Written by: Tom Taylor
- Artist(s): John Timms; Cian Tormey; Bruno Redondo; Clayton Henry; Ruairi Coleman

Superman: Son of Kal-El is an American comic book series published by DC Comics from July 2021 to December 2022, with 18 issues and one annual. The series was written by Tom Taylor, with art by John Timms, Cian Tormey, and Clayton Henry. The series focuses on Jon Kent, the teenage son of Superman/Clark Kent and Lois Lane, as he takes over his father's mantle as Superman and is entrusted with the protection of Earth while his father is away from Earth.

== Plot ==
After his father's departure to space, 17-year-old Jon Kent takes up the mantle of Earth's Superman. Hoping to change the world and tackle modern-day issues, Jon begins to listen to an underground journalism stream known as The Truth. After hearing on the stream about a boat of refugees sinking, Jon saves the boat and flies them to Metropolis. He then meets the head of The Truth who reveals himself to be 17-year-old Jay Nakamura. Jay explains that the refugees were from the country of Gamorra, where a dictator, Henry Bendix, colonized the island, took control of its resources, and now controls the press. Bendix had manipulated the news to make the island seem like a paradise to outsiders, while in reality, he was trafficking Gamorrans and others from around the world. He implanted superpowered genes and mind-control chips through experiments to create an army known as The Rising, who intend on enslaving the rest of the world. Jay, a refugee of Gamorra who escaped early and was given the power of intangibility, was then saved by The Revolutionaries (who debuted in 2019's Suicide Squad: Bad Blood), a group of superpowered adults from around the world who were similarly trafficked by Bendix and experimented on. With his freedom, Jay created The Truth with The Revolutionaries, which aims to expose the crimes of Bendix and his allies to the world and to encourage the Gamorrans to rebel against their government. Jon offers to aid The Truth's fight against Bendix's army while they gather the information they need for liberation. Along the way, Jay and Jon fall in love and team up with other heroes such as Dreamer and Nightwing. Throughout the series, Superman also faces internal dilemmas over his half-human half-alien heritage, struggles with coming out to his parents and the world, and attempts to tackle other modern-day issues such as climate change and campus shootings.

== Publication history ==
When Tom Taylor was first hired to write the series, he knew he wanted Jon Kent to be bisexual. In an interview with The New York Times, Taylor stated that "the idea of replacing Clark Kent with another straight white savior felt like a missed opportunity" and that "a new Superman had to have new fights—real-world problems—that he could stand up to as one of the most powerful people in the world". Taylor hoped that making Superman bisexual would allow the LGBTQ+ community to feel more visible in comic books and that "everyone needs heroes and they deserve to see themselves in their heroes", in addition that "having the strongest superhero in comics come out is incredibly powerful". He further writes that editors at DC Comics were already considering similar lines of development for Jon and were supportive of his idea.

In August 2021, Ethan Van Sciver, an alt-right figure and former artist of DC Comics, revealed through a video titled "SUPERMAN IS GAY! Shocking DC Comics SCOOP!!" that the new Superman would come out as gay. With no proper evidence, Van Sciver's word was taken as a rumor. As the rumor began to gain more traction, Taylor and executives at DC Comics announced via Twitter on October 11, National Coming Out Day, that Jon Kent would come out as bisexual. They specified that Jon would share a kiss with his future boyfriend in the fifth issue of the series. This reveal was shortly after the second issue of Superman: Son of Kal-El was released.

== Reception ==
Before Jon Kent's reveal as bisexual, the series gained popularity for its writing and emotional beats, with 68,800 copies of its first issue selling, making it the 17th best-selling comic of July 2021. After National Coming Out Day, the series sales continued to grow, with each new issue consistently appearing on Amazon's Top 10 comics best sellers list and Comixology's Top 10 sales after each release. The fifth issue, where Jon and Jay Nakamura share their first kiss, outsold the debut issue, and its popularity saw a spike in sales and required issues #1-5 to reprint. DC Comics illustrators, production staffers, and writer Tom Taylor received death threats following the announcement of Jon's bisexuality, leading to DC staff in Los Angeles requesting the Los Angeles Police Department (LAPD) to patrol the homes and offices of those working on the comic. Taylor later announced on Twitter that every time he received a threat or a homophobic comment, he would donate money to an LGBTQ+ charity in the name of the person who sent the threat.

=== "Superman Comes Out" reporting ===
Jon Kent's coming out gained international recognition, with news sources such as CNN, The New York Times, BBC, and NPR covering the subject. While this reveal was overall met positively, with many stating that it feels refreshing to see mainstream and well-known superheroes represent the LGBTQ+ community, a paywalled article from The New York Times about the series entitled "Superman Comes Out" led to a misconception amongst other outlets that Jon's father Clark Kent was the Superman being depicted as bisexual:

- Dean Cain, who portrayed Clark Kent in the television series Lois & Clark: The New Adventures of Superman, criticized the announcement on the misconception, claiming that a bisexual Clark Kent "isn't bold or brave" (playing off another DC title, "The Brave and the Bold").
- Wendy Rogers, Arizona's State Senator, wrote on Twitter that "Superman loves Lois Lane. Period. Hollywood is trying to make Superman gay and he is not. Just rename the new version to Thooperman so we can all know the difference and avoid seeing it".
- At the Sydney Mardi Gras in 2022, numerous dancers dressed up as Clark Kent and Superman and performed routines while holding newspapers with the "Superman Comes Out" headline.

== Awards ==
The series was nominated for the 34th annual GLAAD Media Award for outstanding comic book/graphic novel. The paperback edition of the comic was nominated for 2023's Gayming Magazine award and was selected for Young Adult Library Services Association's (YALSA) list of "Top Ten Great Graphic Novels for Teens for 2023". It also made CBR's "Top 100 Comics of 2022" list, being placed at 55, and Comicbook's "Best Comics of 2022 (So Far)" list.

== Collected editions ==
#	Title	Material collected	Published date	ISBN
1	The Truth	Superman: Son of Kal-El Vol.1 #1-6	May 31, 2022	978-1779515322
2	The Rising	Superman: Son of Kal-El Vol.1 #7-10, Annual #1, Nightwing #89	November 29, 2022	978-1779517388
3	The Battle for Gamorra	Superman: Son of Kal-El Vol.1 #11-15	May 9, 2023	978-1779520074
