= Nia Nal =

Superheroine from the TV series Supergirl

- Arrowverse and DC Comics character
- Nicole Maines as Nia Nal / Dreamer
- First appearance: "American Alien"; Supergirl; October 14, 2018 DC Pride #1: "Date Night" (June 2021, non-canon) Superman: Son of Kal-El #13 (July 2022, canon)
- Last appearance: "Wildest Dreams"; The Flash; March 29, 2023
- Created by: Robert Rovner; Jessica Queller
- Based on: Nura Nal / Dream Girl by: Edmond Hamilton; John Forte
- Portrayed by: Nicole Maines

In-universe information
- Aliases: Dreamer; Dream Girl
- Species: Naltorian/human
- Occupation: Speechwriter; Reporter
- Affiliation: CatCo Worldwide Media Superfriends
- Family: Maeve Nal (sister); Paul Nal (father); Isabel Nal (mother, deceased)
- Significant other: Brainy
- Nationality: American
- Abilities: Astral projection; Energy construct creation; Energy projection; Oneiromancy; Precognition

Nia Nal, also known by her code name Dreamer, is a superheroine from the Arrowverse television series Supergirl, portrayed by Nicole Maines. The character is based on, and depicted as an ancestor of, the DC Comics character Nura Nal / Dream Girl. She debuts in the fourth season of the series. Nia Nal is the first transgender superhero on television. Maines reprised the role in the ninth and final season of The Flash.

Nia made her comics debut in 2021, in the DC Pride installment "Date Night", and then the 2024 graphic novel Bad Dream: A Dreamer Story, before making her first appearance in the mainstream DC Universe in Issue 13 of Superman: Son of Kal-El, all of which were written by Maines.

== Storylines ==
Nia Nal, who has a degree in international relations from Georgetown University, was a political speechwriter in Washington, D.C. where she worked for Cat Grant, the White House Press Secretary, under the administration of President Olivia Marsdin. She is sent to National City to be taken under the wing of Catco Worldwide Media employee Kara Danvers to learn the ways of reporting. As there is increasing anti-alien hatred in the United States, Nia, who reveals herself to be transgender, convinces Catco CEO James Olsen to write an editorial against this hatred. Kara and Nia later interview a healer alien, Amadei, to counter the anti-alien rhetoric. Afterwards, Kara and James discover that Nia has narcolepsy. Nia wakes up suddenly from a dream involving the alien-hating Ben Lockwood. When Kara visits her, Nia reveals she is an alien from the planet Naltor, and select women of this race develop the power of precognition. Brainy, another alien, helps Nia with her dreams which lead them to Lockwood, who is ultimately arrested after being confronted.

Nia has ill confidence about her family when she develops the unwanted "Dreamer" powers that occur to one female in every generation in her family. Nia's sister Maeve, who was taught dream interpretation while expecting to gain the powers, discovers Nia has the powers and renounces her. Kara reveals her identity as the superhero Supergirl to Nia to reassure her. While Nia's mother Isabel lies dying of a spider bite, Nia uses her powers to talk to her mother about them, who assures her she will be able to continue the Dreamer line. Nia trains under Brainy, and after taking the alter ego "Dreamer", defeats a supervillain team called "The Elite" with Kara, J'onn J'onzz and Brainy's help. When Supergirl is framed for multiple crimes and declared a public enemy, Nia is among the few people not fooled. With Kara ceasing to operate as Supergirl, Nia takes her place as National City's superhero Dreamer. J'onn and Nia are sent to Shelley Island, where enslaved aliens are setting up a Claymore satellite on Lex Luthor's orders to destroy Argo City. J'onn and Nia escape and overload the satellite. After Luthor's defeat, Supergirl's name cleared and the anti-alien hatred ended, Nia and Brainy enter a relationship.

== Concept and creation ==
In January 2018, Supergirl creator and executive producer Greg Berlanti spoke at an event about the lack of trans representation in the broader Arrowverse. "We don't have an active trans character across the shows[...] And so I still feel behind the times every day on that issue," Berlanti said. In May 2018, it was reported that an open casting call was searching to cast a transgender woman of any ethnicity in her early 20s to join Supergirl's fourth season as Nia Nal. The character was initially described as, "A confident, wunderkind of a fashionista. Once a political speechwriter, Nia is the newest addition to the Catco investigative reporting team. With her she brings sparkling wit and biting humor but under that banter-y, chic façade, lays a soulful young woman who has much to offer the world. A young Cat Grant type."

On July 21, 2018, trans activist and actress Nicole Maines was announced in the role at the show's San Diego Comic-Con panel. It was also confirmed that Nia would become the superhero "Dreamer" and that she is an ancestor of the Legion of Super-Heroes member Nura Nal / Dream Girl. Maines described Nia Nal / Dreamer as having "this ferocious drive to protect people and to fight against discrimination and hatred. She's the superhero we need right now." The character is the first transgender superheroine on television.

== Powers and abilities ==
Nia Nal's powers include precognition, and astral projection.

== In other media ==
=== Comics ===
On June 8, 2021, Dreamer made her comic book debut in the story "Date Night", written by Maines, featured in DC Pride #1. On June 2, 2022, the official DC Twitter account announced Dreamer would appear in a graphic novel written by Maines with art by Rye Hickman, called "Bad Dream: A Dreamer Story", which was released in 2024.

On July 12, 2022, Nia appeared in Superman: Son of Kal-El #13, making her debut within the main DC comics continuity.

=== Video games ===
Dreamer appears as a cosmetic costume in Fortnite. She was added during the "Rainbow Royale" event in 2022, which was made to celebrate all the players who are a part of the LGBTQ+ community. Just like how she was the first transgender superhero on television, she is also the first playable character in the game to be transgender.

== See also ==
- Coagula, the first transgender superhero in DC's publishing history
