= Nicole Maines =

American actress, writer and transgender rights activist (born 1997)

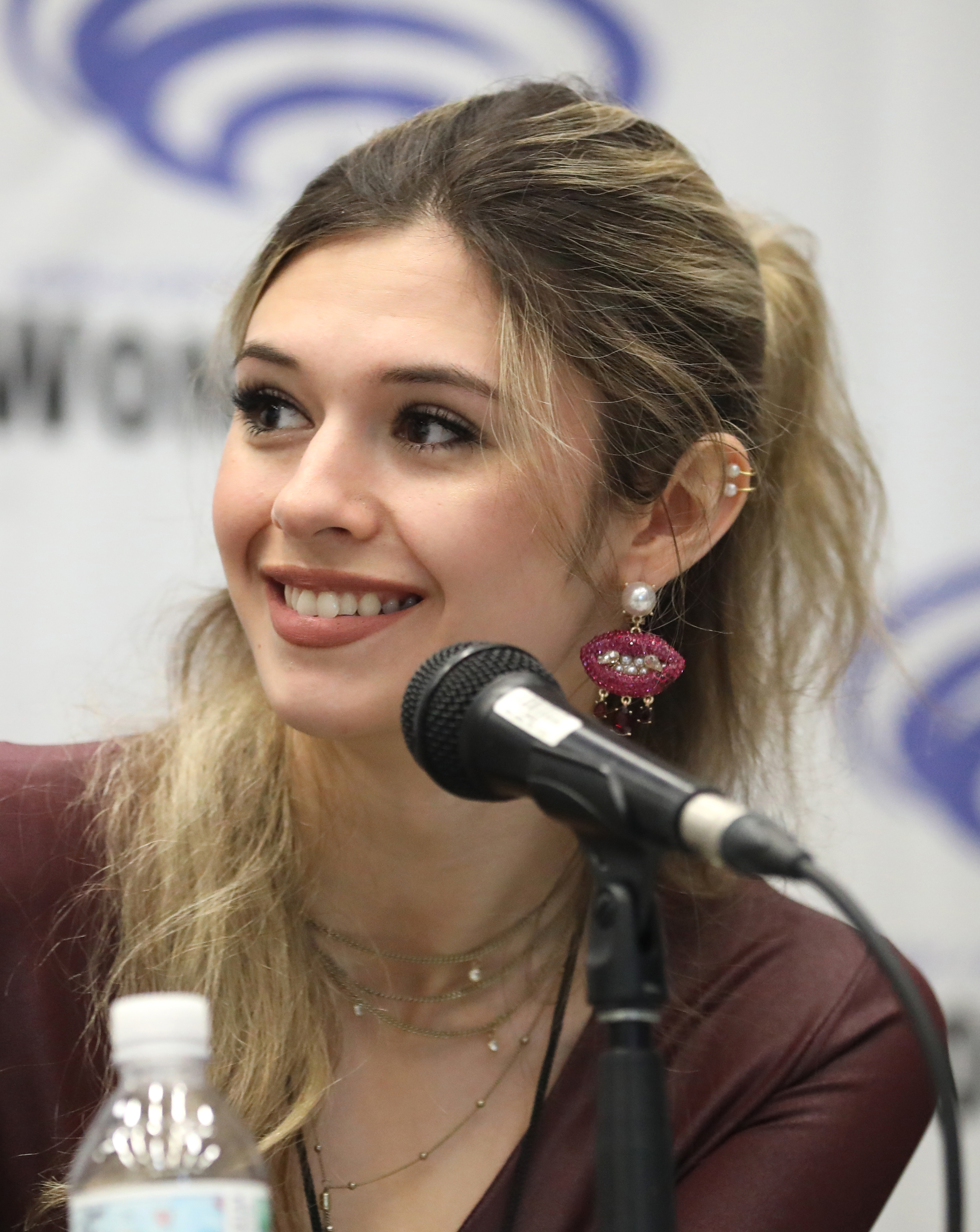
- Maines at the 2024 WonderCon
- Born: October 7, 1997 (age 29); Gloversville, New York, U.S.
- Education: Waynflete School
- Occupations: Actress; comic book writer; activist
- Years active: 2015–present
- Known for: Susan Doe in Maine Supreme Court case Doe v. Regional School Unit 26; Supergirl

Nicole Amber Maines (born October 7, 1997) is an American actress, comic book writer and transgender rights activist. Prior to her acting career, she was the anonymous plaintiff in the Maine Supreme Judicial Court case Doe v. Regional School Unit 26, in which she argued her school district could not deny her access to the female bathroom for being transgender. The court ruled in 2014 that barring transgender students from the school bathroom consistent with their gender identity is unlawful, the first such ruling by a state court.

As an actress, Maines played Nia Nal on The CW superhero series Supergirl (2018–2021) in the fourth through sixth seasons. She is the first person to portray a transgender superhero on television. She plays the recurring role of Lisa in the second season of Yellowjackets (2023–present).

== Early life and education ==
Maines and her brother Jonas were adopted at birth as identical twins by Kelly and Wayne Maines in 1997; one of their biological parents was Kelly's second cousin. Though they spent their early years in Gloversville, New York, they grew up in Portland, Maine. Maines was assigned male at birth and started showing signs of gender variance at a young age; when she was two years old, Maines reportedly asked her mother questions like "When do I get to be a girl?" and "When will my penis fall off?" She preferred playing with toys intended for girls and identified with female characters in cartoons and movies. Maines herself said she knew she was not a boy as young as three years old and started explicitly telling her family who she was by the age of four. Her brother, Jonas, accepted her gender identity from a young age. While the two were still in elementary school, Jonas reportedly told their father, "Face it, Dad, you have a son and a daughter."

Maines says she chose the name Nicole (Nikki for short) after the character Nicole Bristow, one of Zoey's sidekicks on the Nickelodeon show Zoey 101. She initially wanted to be called Quinn from the same show, but she kept making spelling errors when writing the name, so she settled on Nicole. Her middle name, Amber, was suggested by her mother, who liked how it sounded. Maines and her family were hesitant to change her name officially because of a Maine law that any name change must be announced in the newspaper; in order to keep her identity private, however, her family successfully petitioned for an exemption to the law, allowing her to change her name officially.

In July 2015, Maines had gender-affirming surgery in Philadelphia, a month after graduating from high school.

Maines attended high school at Portland, Maine's Waynflete School, and attended the University of Maine, alongside her brother Jonas. However, according to her father, Maines chose not to return in the fall of 2018 in order to pursue acting.

Maines was popularized by the 2015 book Becoming Nicole: The Transformation of an American Family by Washington Post writer Amy Ellis Nutt which tells the story of her family coming to terms with her gender identity. Many articles about the Maines family were published, many focusing on how one identical twin can be transgender and one can be cisgender. Soon after Donald Trump's second inauguration as President of the United States in 2025, Becoming Nicole was included in a list of books banned from schools operated by the Department of Defense for the education of students of U.S. military personnel.

=== Doe v. Regional School Unit 26 ===
Maines used the name Susan Doe in the landmark case Doe v. Regional School Unit 26, which is also referred to as Doe v. Clenchy. In 2007, when Maines was in 5th grade in elementary school at Asa Adams Elementary School in Orono, Maine, the grandfather of a male classmate complained about Maines using the girls' bathroom. Following that incident, she was barred from using the female bathroom and forced to use the staff bathroom. With the help of the Maine Human Rights Commission, Maines and her family filed a complaint against the Orono school district, which is now called RSU 26, claiming the school was discriminating against her. The school district did not take any action to address the complaint, so the family filed a lawsuit against the district. The case eventually made its way up to the state Supreme Court in Bangor, and the Gay and Lesbian Advocates and Defenders of Boston represented Maines and her family. The oral arguments were mainly focused on the tension between a law passed in the 1920s that requires gender-segregated bathrooms and a 2005 provision in the Maine Human Rights Act that prohibits sexual orientation-based discrimination.

In June 2014, the Maine Supreme Judicial Court ruled 5–1 that the school district violated the state's Human Rights Act, and prohibited the district from barring transgender students access to bathrooms consistent with their gender identity. Maines and her family were provided compensation of $75,000 following the discrimination lawsuit. It was the first time in the nation that a court ruled it unlawful to force a transgender student to use the bathroom associated with the sex they were assigned at birth and the first time Maine's Supreme Court interpreted amendments to the Maine Human Rights Act as prohibiting sexual orientation based discrimination.

== Career ==
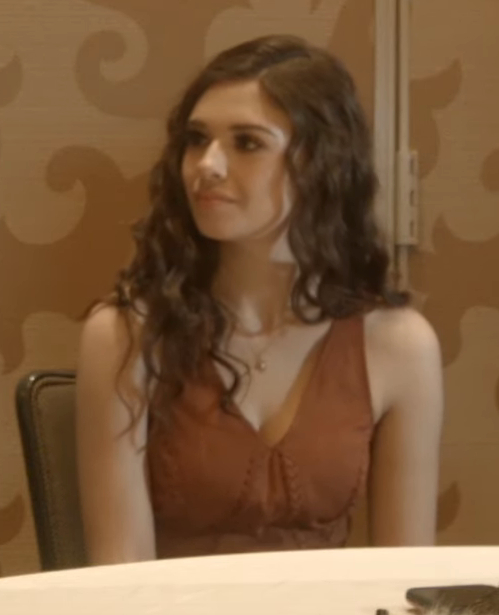
Maines in 2019

In 2015, Maines and her family were the subject of Becoming Nicole: The Transformation of an American Family, a book by Washington Post writer Amy Ellis Nutt. It chronicles the family coming to terms with Maines' being transgender. In June 2015, Maines appeared on the USA Network show Royal Pains as a transgender teen whose hormones might be endangering her health. In 2016, Maines was one of 11 individuals featured in an HBO documentary titled The Trans List. In the documentary, Maines and several other people relate their personal stories of being transgender.

In July 2018, it was announced that Maines would appear as a series regular in the fourth season of The CW series Supergirl. She appeared as Nia Nal / Dreamer, a distant relative of Legion member Dream Girl, and played the first transgender superhero on television. Her character is described as a "soulful woman with a fierce drive to protect others". The character is a reporter whom Kara takes under her wing. She would remain on the series until its end in November 2021, and reprise the role in a final season episode of The Flash in 2023.

In 2019, Maines starred in Bit, a horror movie about queer female vampires, winning the top acting prize at the Outfest Los Angeles LGBTQ Film Festival.

Maines penned the comic book debut of her character from Supergirl, Nia Nal / Dreamer, for DC Pride #1 in 2021. It was announced that she would also pen a solo series on Dreamer in 2022. She co-wrote the script for Dreamer's debut in the comic Superman: Son of Kal-El as well, which was released on July 12, 2022.

In 2023, Maines was cast as Lisa in a recurring role in season two of the Showtime series Yellowjackets.

== Filmography ==
=== Film ===
| Year | Title | Role | Notes | Ref. |
|---|---|---|---|---|
| 2016 | The Trans List | Herself | Documentary | |
| 2017 | Not Your Skin | Herself | Documentary | |
| 2019 | Bit | Laurel | | |
| 2022 | Darby and the Dead | Piper | | |

=== Television ===
| Year | Title | Role | Notes | Ref. |
|---|---|---|---|---|
| 2015 | Royal Pains | Anna | Episode: "The Prince of Nucleotides" | |
| 2018–2021 | Supergirl | Nia Nal / Dreamer | Main cast (Seasons 4–6); 61 episodes | |
| 2020 | Legends of Tomorrow | Nia Nal / Dreamer | Episode: "Crisis on Infinite Earths: Part Five" | |
| 2022 | Good Trouble | Liza Davis | 4 episodes | |
| 2023–2025 | Yellowjackets | Lisa | Recurring role | |
| 2023 | The Flash | Nia Nal / Dreamer | Episode: "Wildest Dreams" | |
| 2023 | Soul of a Nation | Herself | Episode: "The Freedom to Exist with Elliot Page - A Soul of a Nation Presentation" | |
| 2025 | Clean Slate | White Natasha | Episode: "Mess and Magic" | |

=== Video games ===
| Year | Title | Role | Notes | Ref. |
|---|---|---|---|---|
| 2021 | Tom Clancy's Rainbow Six Siege | Osa | Voice role, Crystal Guard expansion | |

== Bibliography ==
=== DC Comics ===
- DC Pride
  - "Date Night" short story (with Rachael Stott, June 8, 2021)
  - Foreword (June 14, 2022)
  - "Bad Dream" preview (May 30, 2023)
- Superman: Son of Kal-El #13 (with Tom Taylor and Clayton Henry, July 12, 2022)
- Lazarus Planet: Assault on Krypton #1: "Gone Dark" (with Skylar Patridge, January 17, 2023)
- Harley Quinn #30: "Everybody Hates Side Quests" (with Mindy Lee, May 23, 2023)
- Titans: Beast World Tour - Metropolis #1: "Primal Pain" (with Steve Orlando and Fico Ossio, December 5, 2023)
- Action Comics #1060: "Squad Dreams" (with Steve Orlando and Fico Ossio, December 12, 2023)
- Suicide Squad: Dream Team #1–4 (with Eddy Barrows, 2024)
- Bad Dream: A Dreamer Story (with Rye Hickman, April 2, 2024)
- Secret Six #1–6 (with Stephen Segovia, 2025)
- Justice League: Dream Girls – A DC Pride Event #1–4 (with Jadzia Axelrod and various artists, 2026)

== Awards ==
| Year | Award | Awarding Organization | Source |
|---|---|---|---|
| 2011 | Roger Baldwin | American Civil Liberties Union of Maine | |
| 2012 | P.E. Pentlarge | EqualityMaine | |
| 2014 | Community Organizing | Hardy Girls Healthy Women | |
| 2014 | Samantha Smith | Maine Women's Fund | |
| 2014 | Woman of the Year | Glamour Magazine | |
| 2015 | Spirit of Matthew Award | Matthew Shepard Foundation | |
| 2015 | Young Women's Social Justice Award | Maryann Hartman Awards | |
| 2016 | Outstanding Individual Episode for a series without a regular LGBT character | 27th GLAAD Media Awards | |
| 2018 | Visibility Award | Human Rights Campaign of Chicago | |
| 2019 | Andy Cray Award for Health & Youth Advocacy | Trans Equality Now | |
| 2019 | Grand Jury Prize for Best Performance | Outfest | |
| 2019 | Outstanding Supporting or Guest Actor Playing an LGBTQ+ Character in a Sci-Fi Series | Autostraddle's Second Annual Gay Emmys | |
| 2020 | Upstander Award | Human Rights Campaign | |
| 2023 | GLAAD Media Award for Outstanding Comic Book (Superman: Son of Kal-El) | GLAAD Media Awards | |
