= DC Pride (comics) =

LGBTQIA+-themed comic book anthology

Publication information
- Publisher: DC Comics
- Format: Yearly
- Genre: see below
- Publication date: 2021–present
- No. of issues: 5

Creative team
- Written by: Various
- Artist: Various

DC Pride is an annual LGBTQIA+-themed comic book anthology first published by DC Comics in June 2021. The second anthology was published in June 2022, the third was released in May 2023 and the fourth in May 2024. A fifth issue was released on June 4, 2025.

== Publication and promotion ==
DC Pride was first announced in March 2021 as an 80-page anthology comic focusing on DC Comics' various LGBTQ characters. It was published in June as a celebration of Pride Month. The anthology is also meant to celebrate the LGBT creators working at DC, with the anthology's writers and artists being members of the LGBT community.

As part of their celebration of Pride Month, DC also announced the limited series Crush & Lobo, focusing on the mercenary Lobo and his lesbian daughter Crush; June would also see the release of the graphic novel Poison Ivy: Thorns. DC Pride also marks the first instance of Nia Nal / Dreamer appearing in comics; the story is written by actress and activist Nicole Maines, who originally portrayed the character in the television series Supergirl. Maines described herself as very excited at getting the opportunity to write the character.

A second anthology, DC Pride 2022, was released in June 2022. DC Comics stated that it is a "100+ page Prestige format annual anthology comic".

In 2023, DC Comics published three titles for Pride Month: DC Pride 2023 #1 (released in May), DC Pride: Through the Years #1 (released in June) and The DC Book of Pride (released on May 16). DC Pride 2023 #1 is the annual 100+ page prestige format anthology. DC Pride: Through the Years #1 is a reprint "collection of three older DC comics that featured LGBTQ+ characters". The DC Book of Pride, by Jadzia Axelrod, is a character guidebook on the 50+ LGBTQ+ DC characters.

DC Pride 2024 was released on May 28, 2024.

DC Pride 2025 was announced on March 11, 2025, and was released on June 4. In contrast to previous editions, the issue features one singular story arc of interweaving narratives centered around a century-old LGBTQ+ tavern in Gotham City. Additional variant covers of the issue were also published throughout June and related variant covers will be published in other series throughout the year.

DC also released a trade paperback collecting DC Pride 2024 and other related stories under the title DC Pride: To the Farthest Reaches, and the DC Pride Box Set collecting the first three issues on May 27, 2025. Additionally all previous DC Pride comics were released as webcomics on DC GO!.

== Content ==
=== 2021 ===
DC Pride was released on June 8, 2021, and consisted of the following stories:

- "The Wrong Side of the Looking Glass" (James Tynion IV, writer; Trung Le Nguyen, artist; Aditya Bidikar, letterer): focuses on lesbian superheroine Kate Kane / Batwoman.
- "He's the Light of My Life!" (Sam Johns, writer; Klaus Janson, artist; Dave McCaig, colorist; Tom Napolitano, letterer): focuses on Alan Scott / Green Lantern—who has recently come out as gay—reconciling with his gay son Todd Rice / Obsidian.
- "By the Victors" (Steve Orlando, writer; Stephen Byrne, artist; Josh Reed, letterer): focuses on gay superheroes Midnighter and Extraño.
- "Clothes Makeup Gift" (Danny Lore, writer; Lisa Sterle, artist; Enrica Eren Angiolini, colorist; Becca Carey, letterer): focuses on the non-binary Flash Jess Chambers and their relationship with Andy Curry, daughter of Aquaman and Mera.
- "Try the Girl" (Vita Ayala, writer; Skylar Patridge, artist; José Villarrubia, colorist; Ariana Maher, letterer): focuses on lesbian superheroine Renee Montoya.
- "Be Gay, Do Crimes" (Sina Grace, writer; Ro Stein and Ted Brandt, artists; Aditya Bidikar, letterer): focuses on gay former supervillain and ally of Wally West, Hartley Rathaway / Pied Piper and his musical face-off against non-binary supervillain Drummer Boy.
- "Another Word for a Truck to Move Your Furniture" (Mariko Tamaki, writer; Amy Reeder, artist; Marissa Louise, colorist; Ariana Maher, letterer): focuses on the relationship between bisexual anti-heroines Harleen Quinzel / Harley Quinn and Dr. Pamela Isley / Poison Ivy.
- "Date Night" (Nicole Maines, writer; Rachael Stott, artist; Enrica Eren Angiolini, colorist; Steve Wands, letterer): focuses on trans woman Nia Nal / Dreamer, whose first appearance was in the live-action series Supergirl, where she is played by Maines.
- "Love Life" (Andrew Wheeler, writer; Luciano Vecchio, artist; Rain Beredo, colorist; Becca Carey, letterer): Jackson Hyde / Aqualad and his date Syl must defend Pride parade from Eclipso, with help from the Justice League Queer.

=== 2022 ===
DC Pride 2022 was released on June 14, 2022, and featured a foreword from Nicole Maines. The anthology consisted of the following stories:

- "Super Pride" (Devin Grayson, Nick Robles, Triona Farrell and Aditya Bidikar): focuses on Jon Kent/Superman, a bisexual man, as he, his boyfriend Jay Nakamura and straight best friend Damian Wayne attend Metropolis Pride and Jon begins to embrace his identity and status as a symbol for both the people of Earth and the LGBT+ community.
- "Confessions" (Stephanie Williams, Meghan Hetrick, Marissa Louise, and Ariana Maher): Lesbian Amazon queen Nubia reveals to her partner Io, a blacksmith, that the sword she made for her was destroyed in a wrestling match with Giganta rather than in an epic battle.
- "Special Delivery" (Travis Moore, Enrica Eren Angiolini, and Ariana Maher): Newly out hero Tim Drake races to meet up with his new boyfriend Bernard so that they can attend their first Pride together despite being distracted by local criminals.
- "Are You Ready for This?" (Danny Lore & Ivan Cohen, Brittney Williams, Enrica Eren Angiolini, and Ariana Maher): Non-binary Earth-11 speedster Jess Chambers (Kid Quick) tries to prove themself as a hero.
- "A World Kept Just For Me" (Alyssa Wong, W. Scott Forbes, and Ariana Maher): Jackson Hyde/Aquaman struggles to be open with his new boyfriend about his childhood in New Mexico.
- "The Gumshoe in Green" (Tini Howard, Evan Cagle, and Lucas Gattoni): Bisexual Woman Jo Mullein/Green Lantern investigates a suspicious couple on an alien planet in this neo-noir thriller.
- "Think of Me" (Ted Brandt & Ro Stein and Frank Cvetkovic): Connor Hawke battles Music Meister while trying to write a letter to his mother explaining his asexuality.
- "Public Display of the Electromagnetic Spectrum" (Greg Lockard, Giulio Macaione, and Aditya Bidikar): The Ray struggles to publicly express his affection towards his boyfriend Xenos.
- "The Hunt" (Dani Fernandez, Zoe Thorogood, Jeremy Lawson, and Aditya Bidikar): Harley Quinn and Poison Ivy face a mysterious foe.
- "Bat's in the Cradle" (Stephanie Phillips, Samantha Dodge, Marissa Louise, and Lucas Gattoni): Jacob Kane reflects upon his relationship with his daughter Kate.
- "Up at Bat" (Jadzia Axelrod, Lynne Yoshii, Tamra Bonvillain, and Ariana Maher): Transgender woman Alysia Yeoh is forced into a fight with Killer Moth when a wounded Barbara Gordon approaches her for help.
- "Finding Batman" (Kevin Conroy with art by J. Bone and Aditya Bidikar): An autobiographical story where Conroy describes how his portrayal of Batman drew from his painful experiences as a gay man.

=== 2023 ===
DC Pride 2023 #1 was released on May 30, 2023. It featured a foreword from Phil Jimenez and an extended tribute to the late trailblazing writer Rachel Pollack, who died before she could begin working on a story for the book. The anthology consists of the following stories:

- "Love's Lightning Heart" (Grant Morrison and Hayden Sherman): A Multiversity story wherein Hank Hallmark / Flashlight goes on a quest to bring Red Racer back to life.
- "Hey, Stranger" (Nadia Shammas and Bruka Jones): Asexual Connor Hawke helps bisexual Tim Drake clean up after a fight, and the two discuss identity and coming out.
- "Subspace Transmission" (A.L. Kaplan): Non-binary heroes Julien Jourdain / Circuit Breaker and Jess Chambers / Flash of Earth-11 must work together to get home after accidentally being sent to another dimension.
- "Anniversary" (Josh Trujillo and Don Aguillo): Midnighter, Apollo, and Alan Scott / Green Lantern work together to push back against bigotry.
- "Lost & Found" (Jeremy Holt and Andrew Drilon): Xanthe Zhou helps Kate Kane / Batwoman protect her family's mausoleum.
- "The Dance" (Rex Ogle and Stephen Sadowski): Ghost-Maker and Catman fight Cannon and Saber.
- "My Best Bet" (Christopher Cantwell and Skylar Patridge): Jon Kent / Superboy helps John Constantine settle a bet.
- "Teamwork Makes the Dream Work" (Mildred Louis): Natasha Irons / Steel wants Nubia to test her new training device.
- "And Baby Makes Three" (Leah Williams and Paulina Ganucheau): Crush crash lands near the dinosaur island where Harley Quinn and Poison Ivy are vacationing.
- "Bad Dream" (Nicole Maines and Rye Hickman): A preview of an upcoming Nia Nal / Dreamer story.

DC Pride: Through the Years #1, released on June 13, contains:

- "The Flash #53 by William Messner-Loebs and Greg LaRocque, in which the Pied Piper comes out to the Flash".
- "Detective Comics #854, by Greg Rucka and J.H. Williams, which launched Batwoman on her solo series".
- "Supergirl #19, by Steve Orlando, Vita Ayala, and Jamal Campbell, in which nonbinary teen Lee Serrano becomes friends with Supergirl.
- An original story, by Tim Sheridan and Cian Tormey, "about Green Lantern Alan Scott, which will lay the groundwork for that character's next storyline".

=== 2024 ===
DC Pride 2024 was released on May 28, 2024, and includes stories featuring Dreamer, Jon Kent, Poison Ivy, Steel (Natasha Irons), Aquaman (Jackson Hyde) and The Ray and a preview of the graphic novel The Strange Case of Harleen and Harley. The anthology consists of the following stories:

- "Hello, Spaceboy" (Al Ewing and Stephen Byrne): Starman teams up with his sometimes-enemy sometimes-lover Komak to investigate a suspicious bioweapon in deep space.
- "The Rivers and the Lakes That You're Used To" (Ngozi Ukazu): Aquaman and his boyfriend Ha'Wea discuss belonging while guarding Xebel from Leviathans. Jackson also spends some time speaking with Orion on New Genesis about the same topic.
- "Marasmius" (Gretchen Felker-Martin and Claire Roe): Poison Ivy and Janet travel to a distant planet in search of a rare mushroom and must contend with the bigoted views of the Earth Heritage Bond Traders.
- "Steeling Time" (Jamila Rowser and O'Neill Jones): Natasha Irons attends a Pride party hosted by her ex-girlfriend Traci Thirteen and attempts to reconcile with her.
- "Bros Down in A-Town" (Jarrett Williams and D.J. Kirkland): Jon Kent and Jay Nakamura take their friends Bunker and Ray to a food festival.
- "Lessons in Astral Projection" (Nicole Maines and Jordan Gibson): Dreamer finds a way to connect with her late mother.
- "Phantom Rodeo" (Calvin Kasulke and Len Gogou): Circuit Breaker teams up with Jay Garrick to defeat a demon from the Speed Force.
- "The Strange Case of Harleen and Harley" (Melissa Marr and Jenn St. Onge): A preview of the young adult graphic novel of the same name starring Harley Quinn and Poison Ivy.
- "Spaces" (Phil Jimenez and Giulio Macaione): An autobiographical story where Jiminez discusses how his early connection to Wonder Woman and the Amazons help him to accept himself as a gay man.

=== 2025 ===
DC Pride 2025 released on June 4, 2025. In contrast to previous editions, the 2025 issue of DC Pride features one singular story arc of interweaving narratives written by Vita Ayala, Jude Ellison, Maya Houston, Sam Maggs, Tim Sheridan, and Josh Trujillo. When a century old LGBTQ+ tavern in Gotham City announces its closure, Alan Scott and a host of other heroes and villains, including Question, Midnighter and Apollo, Harley Quinn, Jo Mullein, Bunker, Connor Hawke, and Blue Snowman, arrive to pay their respects.

== Reception ==
Upon release, DC Pride #1 received widespread acclaim from comics critics. At the review aggregator website Comic Book Roundup, which assigns a weighted mean rating out of 10 to reviews from comics critics, the series received an average score of 9.2 based on 17 reviews. Oliver Sava, for The A.V. Club, wrote: "Corporate offerings celebrating Pride Month often feel like disingenuous attempts to cash in on a social movement, but DC Pride #1 succeeds by showcasing the ways DC Comics has been pushing LGBTQ+ representation for years. [...] Many of the stories in DC Pride feel like the start of something more, and ideally there's enough interest in this one-shot that these heroes can spend more than a month in the spotlight". Sava compared this issue to Marvel Voices Pride and called Marvel's issue "more of a mixed bag". Sava wrote that "while Marvel has dragged its feet in regards to meaningful LGBTQ+ representation in film and television, DC has spent the last decade expanding representation across all of its media".

=== Accolades ===
| Year | Title/Story | Award | Result | Ref |
|---|---|---|---|---|
| 2025 | "Spaces" in DC Pride 2024 by Phil Jimenez | Eisner Award for Best Short Story | Won | |
| 2023 | "Finding Batman" in DC Pride 2022 by Kevin Conroy and J. Bone | Eisner Award for Best Short Story | Won | |
| 2023 | “Finding Batman” in DC Pride 2022 | Ringo Award for Best Single Issue or Story | Shortlisted | |
| 2023 | DC Pride 2022 | GLAAD Media Award for Outstanding Graphic Novel/Anthology | Shortlisted | |
| 2022 | DC Pride 2021 | GLAAD Media Award for Outstanding Graphic Novel/Anthology | Shortlisted | |
| 2022 | DC Pride 2021 | Ringo Award for Best Anthology | Won | |
