= Tom Clarke (Taken) =

- First appearance: "Beyond the Sky" (2002)
- Last appearance: "Taken" (2002)
- Created by: Leslie Bohem
- Portrayed by: Ryan Hurst; Kevin G. Schmidt (child)

In-universe information
- Gender: Male
- Nationality: American

Tom Clarke is a fictional character in the science fiction TV miniseries Taken played by Ryan Hurst.

== Episode 1 Beyond the Sky ==
Tom's first appearance is when he's a young child (played by Kevin G. Schmidt). Tom does not trust John, a strange man who was taken in by Tom's mother, Sally, after being in an accident.

== Episode 2 Jacob and Jesse ==
Years later Tom and his sister Becky return home to visit his mother Sally and his younger brother Jacob for Christmas. Tom and Becky take care of Jacob when Sally goes to a New Year's Eve party where she meets Owen Crawford (who knows that her son Jacob has special abilities). Days later when Jacob is taken by Owen, Tom and Becky eventually find Jacob and bring him back home. Tom then comes up with the idea that they tell the Army that Jacob died in a fire to protect him.

== Episode 3 High Hopes ==
Tom wants revenge on Owen after what he did to his family by spying on him. Tom is given the news that the Army have tracked down Jacob but were stopped. Tom then moves Jacob to a safer location.

== Episode 4 Acid tests ==
Tom is not seen in Episode 4 but manages to get his revenge on Owen by putting a Crop Circle in a field to make Owen think the Aliens have landed.

== Episode 5 Maintenance ==
When Tom feels its safer for Jacob to return home, they go to see their mother, Sally, who is dying of cancer. After Sally dies, Tom tells Jacob that he should tell the world about his abilities but Jacob refuses and says it won't be a good idea. Tom begins writing books about their existence of aliens and UFOs. During a TV Interview Tom is asked if he can reveal what made him a believer but refuses to answer the question, leaving Owen's son Eric Crawford wanting to know what made Tom change his mind. Tom later finds out that his sister Becky is having an affair with Eric. Tom persuades Becky that Eric is doing it to find out the truth about Tom changing his mind. Tom then later gets together with a group of people and confront Eric while he and the Army were moving evidence of the Roswell crash. All the evidence then disappears when a spaceship takes it all away.

== Episode 6 Charlie and Lisa ==
After the death of his brother, Jacob, Tom is determined to protect his niece, Lisa, from Eric Crawford. Tom tells Lisa the truth about her father being half alien and the powers it gave him. Tom is then in the hospital with Lisa after she gives birth to her daughter, Allie.

== Episode 10 Taken ==
Tom meets up with Lisa, Charlie, and their daughter, Allie, but is shocked to see alien visitor John is with them. Tom takes them to Texas to his mother's place where they would be safe and John later goes back home. After the Army track down their location, the aliens take Allie for her protection. Tom then gives Charlie and Lisa the diary of Allie.
