= Andover High School =

Andover High School may refer to:

- Andover High School (Kansas), Andover, Kansas
- Andover Central High School, Andover, Kansas
- Andover High School (Maryland), Linthicum, Maryland
- Andover High School (Massachusetts), Andover, Massachusetts
- North Andover High School, North Andover, Massachusetts
- Andover High School (Michigan), Bloomfield Hills, Michigan
- Andover High School (Minnesota), Andover, Minnesota
