= Julie Crawford =

Julie Crawford may refer to:

- Julie Crawford (Taken), fictional character
- Julie Crawford, Communist candidate in City and East (London Assembly constituency) 1988
- Julie Crawford, co-producer of Unnatural Causes: Is Inequality Making Us Sick?
