= Adam Kaufman =

Adam Kaufman may refer to:

- Adam Kaufman (24 character), fictional character in the American television series 24
- Adam Kaufman (actor), American actor
