= Margaret Sawyer =

Margaret Sawyer may refer to:

- Maggie Sawyer, a fictional character that appears in stories published by DC Comics
- Peggy Sawyer, a fictional character in 42nd Street
