= Supergirl season 3 =

Supergirl
- Season 3
- Home media cover Blu-ray
- Showrunners: Andrew Kreisberg; Jessica Queller; Robert Rovner
- Starring: Melissa Benoist; Mehcad Brooks; Chyler Leigh; Jeremy Jordan; Katie McGrath; Odette Annable; Chris Wood; David Harewood
- No. of episodes: 23

Release
- Original network: The CW
- Original release: October 9, 2017 – June 18, 2018

Season chronology
- ← Previous; Season 2 Next → Season 4

The third season of the American television series Supergirl, which is based on the DC Comics character Supergirl / Kara Zor-El, focuses on a costumed superhero who is the cousin to Superman and one of the last surviving Kryptonians.

The season was ordered in January 2017. It was filmed from July 2017 to April 2018, and filming took place in Vancouver. Alongside Melissa Benoist, who stars in the title role, principal cast members Mehcad Brooks, Chyler Leigh, Jeremy Jordan, Chris Wood and David Harewood return from the second season. They are joined by Katie McGrath, who was promoted to a series regular from her recurring status in the previous season, and new cast member Odette Annable. Former series regulars Calista Flockhart and Floriana Lima return as guest star and recurring respectively.

The season premiered on The CW on October 9, 2017, and ran until June 18, 2018, over 23 episodes. The series was renewed for a fourth season on April 2, 2018.

== Episodes ==
Supergirl, season 3 episodes
No. overall	No. in season	Title	Directed by	Written by	Original release date	Prod. code	U.S. viewers (millions)
43	1	"Girl of Steel"	Jesse Warn	Story by : Andrew Kreisberg; Teleplay by : Robert Rovner & Caitlin Parrish	October 9, 2017	T13.20651	1.87
Kara has been dreaming of Mon-El and has become obsessive with her vigilantism, ignoring downtime with others in her life. Lena and James oppose industrialist Morgan Edge regarding his plan for waterfront housing estates. James is running CatCo with Cat serving as White House Press Secretary and Snapper on sabbatical. Kara quits CatCo, believing she needs to prioritize being Supergirl and pushing away Alex, who is making plans to marry Maggie. Edge hires criminal Bloodsport to attack the unveiling of a Supergirl statue by the waterfront with a submarine, forcing Kara to go underwater to stop them. When she passes out, her dream of Mon-El rallies her and she stops the attack. In order to nullify Edge's attempts to buy CatCo and silence it, Lena buys it herself. Kara decides to return to CatCo and rejoins her friends. Meanwhile, Samantha "Sam" Arias, a woman whom Alex helped at the waterfront, wakes up after a dream with a disturbing creature.
44	2	"Triggers"	David McWhirter	Gabriel Llanas & Anna Musky-Goldwyn	October 16, 2017	T13.20652	1.76
Kara battles a powerful metahuman bank robber called Psi, who can evoke her victims' deepest fears, forcing Kara to struggle with her memories of Krypton's destruction and her guilt over Mon-El. After Winn's psychic dampener fails, Kara finally overcomes her fear and arrests Psi. Lena decides to run CatCo personally, taking James by surprise and creating friction with Kara, who initially has difficulty separating work and their friendship. Sam Arias' daughter, Ruby, deliberately puts herself in danger to test whether her mother has superpowers, but she is rescued by Kara. Sam begins to question who she is and her origins and becomes Lena's replacement at L-Corp, acting as its CFO. Alex learns that Maggie seems to not want children. J'onn receives a telepathic summons from M'gann, urging him to come to Mars immediately.
45	3	"Far from the Tree"	Dermott Downs	Jessica Queller & Derek Simon	October 23, 2017	T13.20653	1.76
J'onn tells Kara and Alex about M'gann's message and Kara goes with him as back-up. The two journey to Mars in his spaceship, encountering M'gann and a resistance of White Martians. They discover J'onn's father, M'yrnn, has been coerced into giving the villainous White Martians the location of the Staff of Kolar, a psychic weapon that can defeat the resistance. J'onn rescues M'yrnn, who initially believes J'onn is a White Martian in disguise. Kara convinces M'yrnn to let J'onn prove his identity. Having acquired the location, the resistance arrives and defeats a contingent of White Martian operatives. The recovered staff is entrusted to J'onn, who returns to Earth with M'yrnn and Kara. Meanwhile, Eliza throws Alex and Maggie a bridal shower. Alex convinces Maggie to invite her father, who comes but still cannot tolerate her homosexuality. She tells him that she no longer needs him because she now has a family who accepts her. However, she confirms to Alex that she does not want children.
46	4	"The Faithful"	Jesse Warn	Paula Yoo & Katie Rose Rogers	October 30, 2017	T13.20654	1.82
The night Kara first revealed her powers and became Supergirl, a grieving passenger, Thomas Coville, was inspired by her. In the present, Kara attends an ostensible self-help group with Winn and James and discovers a "cult" made up of people she previously saved. Led by Coville, they worship Supergirl and follow Kryptonian god Rao's teachings. Those who wish to join initiate disasters so that Supergirl will save them. Coville recognizes Kara in her alter-ego when she confronts him. The group plans to blow up a stadium filled with people. When Kara tries to stop them, she finds Kryptonite inside the bomb which she uses to wound herself, thereby disillusioning the cult. Alex gets rid of the Kryptonite and, with Coville's help, pushes the bomb into a deep hole created by Kara's heat vision, where it detonates. The explosion causes a being in a vessel to awaken. Coville advises Kara to follow Rao to find her path. Meanwhile, Sam has a vision of a monstrous creature in her home, telling her she soon will "reign". Alex reveals to Kara that, while Maggie does not want children, she does.
47	5	"Damage"	Kevin Smith	Eric Carrasco & Cindy Lichtman	November 6, 2017	T13.20655	1.87
Several children are diagnosed with lead poisoning. Morgan publicly blames Lena's lead device which repelled the Daxamites, causing the public to turn on her. She attempts to give a speech to defend herself, but ends up taking fire. Kara and Sam investigate, discovering that all the affected children attended a public pool laced with a chemical which causes the same symptoms and is manufactured by one of Morgan's subsidiaries. Lena confronts Morgan alone. She is knocked unconscious and imprisoned inside a plane with barrels of the chemical, set on a collision course for the city's water supply. Lena manages to get a message to Supergirl, who rescues Lena, secures the barrels, and destroys the plane. Morgan, however, covers his tracks. Maggie and Alex realize that, even though they love each other, they must let each other go because they disagree on having children. Alex lets Maggie know how much she has helped her happily accept herself. Maggie, in turn, lets Alex know how much stronger she grew as a person. They part tearfully, with Maggie bringing everything full circle: "See you around, Danvers". Sam discovers that she was shot during the attempt on Lena's life, but was not injured.
48	6	"Midvale"	Rob Greenlea	Caitlin Parrish & Jess Kardos	November 13, 2017	T13.20656	1.89
Kara and Alex arrive at Eliza's home to help overcome their grief, but they quarrel instead. Ten years prior, while attending Midvale High School, Alex and Kara did not get along until a mutual friend, Kenny Li, was murdered. A photograph on his laptop revealed their teacher was in a relationship with Alex's best friend. Kara sent the remaining encrypted files to her cousin Clark's friend Chloe for decryption. After an attempt on Alex and Kara's lives, the teacher was arrested, but Alex discovered an alibi for him. Kara decided to cease looking into Kenny's death after a conversation with Noel Neill, an FBI agent who strongly resembles Alura (in reality, a disguised J'onn). Alex went to the sheriff Ronald Collins for help just as Kara learned that the sheriff was involved in drug dealing and was Kenny's killer. Kara saved Alex from being killed by the sheriff. The sisters bonded and Kara decided to not use her powers again, taking Agent Neill's advice to embrace her new home. In the present, after recalling their first adventure together, the sisters reconcile and return to National City.
49	7	"Wake Up"	Chad Lowe	Gabriel Llanas & Anna Musky-Goldwyn	November 20, 2017	T13.20657	1.92
Kara, J'onn, and Winn investigate a crashed spaceship detected beneath National City. They find Mon-El and occupied stasis tanks aboard. They take him back to the DEO; when he attempts an escape, a suspicious Kara locks him in a cell. Mon-El convinces Winn to take him back to the ship because the life-support systems are unstable. Kara follows them. Mon-El explains that his pod went through a wormhole, bringing him to the 31st century where L-Corp had long since developed a cure for the Daxamite lead allergy. While only seven months had passed for Kara, Mon-El experienced seven years in the future. One of the tanks begins to malfunction; Mon-El cannot break it open, so Kara frees its occupant: Mon-El's wife, Imra. J'onn decides to rent an apartment for him and M'yrnn to live together, taking the first step towards restoring their bond. After discovering another superhuman ability, Sam visits her foster mother and learns of her Kryptonian origins. She later travels to the "Fortress of Sanctuary", where a holographic artificial intelligence reveals that, while Sam's motherhood was unexpected, her Kryptonian physiology is enhanced and she is destined to become the Worldkiller. Despite Sam's resistance, her eyes turn red and her alternate persona – Reign – is triggered from her subconscious.
50	8	"Crisis on Earth-X, Part 1"	Larry Teng	Story by : Andrew Kreisberg & Marc Guggenheim; Teleplay by : Robert Rovner & Jessica Queller	November 27, 2017	T13.20658	2.71
On the parallel world of "Earth-X", a Nazi regime rules the planet where an archer, Dark Arrow, is the Führer, and personally hunts the resistance forces. Dark Arrow seizes a temporal gateway from the Freedom Fighters members including James' parallel universe doppelgänger, a device that allows interdimensional travel to other universes; he schemes to invade parallel Earths with the device to spread his reign so that it may last. Kara and Alex travel to Earth-1 to attend Barry Allen's wedding with Iris West. Alex meets the Legends' leader Sara Lance / White Canary, taking the first step to recover from her break up with Maggie. The wedding ceremony is interrupted by Earth-X Nazi invaders, led by Dark Arrow, his Kryptonian-powered wife Overgirl, and his partner Prometheus. After Kara defeats and injures Overgirl during the fight the Nazis retreat, and Alex and Sara capture Prometheus to interrogate. As Overgirl recuperates, she, Dark Arrow, and a yellow-clad speedster regroup and discuss their next move, Dark Arrow and Overgirl are revealed as parallel universe doppelgängers of Oliver Queen / Green Arrow and Kara, and the yellow speedster is Barry's nemesis from the 22nd century Eobard Thawne / Reverse-Flash. Note : This episode begins a crossover event that continues on Arrow season 6 episode 8 and The Flash season 4 episode 8, and concludes on Legends of Tomorrow season 3 episode 8.
51	9	"Reign"	Glen Winter	Paula Yoo & Caitlin Parrish	December 4, 2017	T13.20659	1.81
Sam wakes up at home with no memory of being in a Kryptonian fortress, but finds she is oddly tired. A mysterious Kryptonian symbol, unknown to Kara, appears throughout National City and Thomas Coville later explains to her that it is a mark of a great evil from Krypton deliberately erased from its society. Mon-El and Imra explain how their ship came from the future and how the former founded the superhero team, the Legion. As Kara hosts a Christmas get-together at her apartment, Sam becomes Reign who, as a masked vigilante, attacks and kills random criminals around National City, including Edge, who is able to escape when she attacks him. Reign's rampage damages Supergirl's reputation due to her having the same powers and similar physical attributes. Lena and James begin a relationship after an assassination attempt on Lena by Edge. Kara decides to face Reign, and they fight through the city. Though the fight clears Supergirl's name and reveals another Kryptonian in National City, Reign eventually overpowers Kara and drops her off a building, requiring emergency medical care from the DEO. On Christmas Day, Ruby runs downstairs to find her mother, but Sam does not seem quite right.
52	10	"Legion of Superheroes"	Jesse Warn	Derek Simon & Eric Carrasco	January 15, 2018	T13.20660	2.17
Kara's injuries are healed by the Legion's technology, but she remains in a coma following her defeat by Reign. The Legion's Coluan member, Brainiac 5, enters her mind to try to wake her. Though Sam continues her life with Ruby, Reign takes control sporadically without Sam's knowledge and Ruby remains unaware of her mother's divided personality. Reign continues her rampage throughout National City and has a series of confrontations with the DEO and the Legion. Kara emerges from her coma to join them when Reign seeks to destroy a prison. Kara injects Reign with a concentrated dose of liquefied Kryptonite, forcing her to retreat. Prior to Kara's awakening, J'onn, who disguised himself as Kara to cover for her, advises Lena on her new relationship with James. Lena sees that James is not trying to distance himself from her because of her family, but she is afraid to be with him; they become closer afterward. Kara takes steps to move on from Mon-El after her near-death experience and develops a friendship with Brainiac 5. As Reign recuperates in her fortress, she learns that there are other Worldkillers like her and Coville joins her cause.
53	11	"Fort Rozz"	Gregory Smith	Gabriel Llanas & Anna Musky-Goldwyn	January 22, 2018	T13.20661	2.07
Sam prepares to go on a business trip, leaving Alex to babysit Ruby. The DEO learns that a priestess with knowledge of Reign's mission is imprisoned in Fort Rozz, which is currently drifting near a blue star that emits a radiation fatal to males and strips Kara of her powers. Kara forms a team with Imra, Livewire, and Psi to locate the priestess. Reign learns of their mission and intercepts them inside Fort Rozz. The team locates the priestess, Jindah Kal Rozz, and she reveals the existence of two other Worldkillers (Purity and Pestilence) before Reign kills her. Livewire sacrifices herself to save Kara's life while Psi uses her powers to drive off Reign. Imra's ship starts drifting into the star, but Winn, communicating through the Voyager 2 probe, saves the vessel. The team returns to Earth and Kara repays Psi's assistance by asking the DEO to give her better accommodations. Prompted by a nightmare, Sam asks Alex for help with her "missing time". A woman named Julia Freeman is struck by a car; however, she effortlessly moves it off her chest, and her eyes turn silver, revealing herself to be a Worldkiller.
54	12	"For Good"	Tawnia McKiernan	Story by : Robert Rovner; Teleplay by : Cindy Lichtman & Alix Sternberg	January 29, 2018	T13.20662	2.11
Lena is poisoned by an unknown hitman; James pursues him, but the hitman is shot down by a sniper. Kara and Alex are able to stabilize Lena at the DEO. Meanwhile, Edge's car is remotely hijacked. Lena and Kara gatecrash a party hosted by Morgan Edge, where Lena confronts him about trying to kill her and warns that her mother wants revenge, having killed the hitman and hijacked Edge’s car. A drone controlled by Lillian Luthor attacks Morgan, prompting him to admit he tried to kill Lena. After Supergirl arrives, Lillian attacks her with a Kryptonite blade while wearing Lex's exoskeleton. Kara and Mon-El fight Lillian until Winn hacks the drone and disables the armor. Edge is stopped from escaping with the recorder containing his confession by Guardian; Lena retrieves the recorder. Lillian and Edge are arrested. Sam fears she has a brain tumor due to her memory loss, but all the medical tests come back normal. Winn, J'onn, and Mon-El deduce that the Worldkillers are genetically modified to be stronger and more able to blend into the human race than conventional Kryptonians. Suspecting the Worldkillers arrived on Earth around the same time as Superman and have secret identities, Winn discovers four possible women, including Julia Freeman, whom Kara identifies.
55	13	"Both Sides Now"	Jesse Warn	Jessica Queller & Paula Yoo	February 5, 2018	T13.20663	2.12
Supergirl and the DEO converge on Julia Freeman's home; initially, she seems normal, but her alter-ego, Purity, takes over and fights them before being subdued. Sam, on sick leave from L-Corp due to her amnesiac episodes, decides to spend time with Ruby by taking her ice skating. However, Reign takes control over Sam after Purity's capture and abandons Ruby to deal with the DEO. Ruby calls Lena after finding herself alone. Through Purity, Supergirl suspects that each of the Worldkillers' personalities are split, including Reign's; therefore, in order to stop them, they need to reach their benevolent sides. When Purity escapes despite the heroes' attempts to recapture her, Julia regains control, but Reign abducts her to the Fortress of Sanctuary to complete her transformation. While repairing the Legion's ship, Mon-El confides to J'onn that he still loves Kara despite also loving Imra, although he did not marry her on his own terms. Imra confesses to Mon-El that she and Brainiac 5 have a secret agenda. At L-Corp, Reign briefly takes control over Sam in front of Lena.
56	14	"Schott Through the Heart"	Glen Winter	Caitlin Parrish & Derek Simon	April 16, 2018	T13.20664	1.91
Kara, Alex, and Winn attend his father's funeral. Winn is approached by his estranged mother, Mary, but remains distant. Kara saves Winn and Mary when the coffin detonates. Mary reveals to Winn that, after trying to escape to an abuse shelter, Winn's father ran them off the road and threatened Winn's life if she ever went near him again. Flying monkey toys attack the DEO, which Kara and James fend off. Mary helps her son analyze the toys to discover their origin. Mon-El attempts to reconnect with Kara and reveals the Legion came to National City to stop the Worldkiller Pestilence, who will transform into Blight in 1,000 years. Toyman's penitentiary officer, who sent the toys, kidnaps Mary and holds her at an abandoned toy factory. Kara, Mon-El, and Winn save Mary after battling a toy dinosaur and incapacitating the officer. James calls up Lena, who claims to be busy with L-Corp work; she is keeping Sam in a locked medical bay in L-Corp under sedation.
57	15	"In Search of Lost Time"	Andi Armaganian	Story by : Eric Carrasco; Teleplay by : Katie Rose Rogers & Nicki Holcomb	April 23, 2018	T13.20665	1.38
Lena brings Sam out of sedation and tells her that her blood tests are normal, but further analysis shows Sam undergoes a metamorphosis at the cellular level when she becomes Reign. Sam refuses to believe her even when shown images of Reign that correspond with the times of her blackouts. At the DEO, M'yrnn performs a ritual to help preserve his mind, but the psychic bleed affects everyone by bringing out their aggression, except for Mon-El (whose Legion ring protects him). Mon-El trains Supergirl on how to use her cape during combat. M'yrnn's ritual causes chaos around the DEO. J'onn convinces M'yrnn to wear a power-dampening bracelet to stop the psychic bleed after a White Martian and other prisoners escape their cells. Sam refuses to believe she is Reign, so Lena is forced to push Sam to the limit emotionally by threatening to keep Ruby away from her, causing Sam to turn into Reign. After she regains control and Lena shows her the video proof, Sam asks Lena to keep Ruby away from her until she is cured. While flying, Kara and Mon-El see dead birds fall from the sky and realize Pestilence is behind it.
58	16	"Of Two Minds"	Alexandra La Roche	Gabriel Llanas & Anna Musky-Goldwyn	April 30, 2018	T13.20666	1.50
The DEO investigates the rash of dead animals; it spreads to humans, as people develop flu-like symptoms with a large scratch on their wrists. Imra believes this is the work of Pestilence, the third Worldkiller. Winn and Alex become infected; Brainiac 5 creates a cure using a blood transfusion from Mon-El and Imra, though it fails. The DEO discovers the person behind the attacks is Grace Parker, who has fully accepted her powers and role as a Worldkiller. Supergirl, Mon-El, and Imra battle Pestilence until Purity arrives to help her escape. Imra is able, however, to gain a blood sample from Pestilence for Brainiac to manufacture a working cure. Lena still holds Sam at the L-Corp lab to run tests, where she causes Reign to appear for brief moments so she can learn more about her. While in Sam's mind, Reign tells her they are coming for them. After detecting Purity and Pestilence approaching L-Corp, Kara, Mon-El, Imra, and J'onn go to warn Lena, where they discover Sam. Purity and Pestilence arrive, freeing Reign, and the three fly off together.
59	17	"Trinity"	Jesse Warn	Story by : Jessica Queller; Teleplay by : Caitlin Parrish & Derek Simon	May 7, 2018	T13.20667	1.60
Lena is questioned at the DEO and reveals that she contained Reign using the last of Lex's Kryptonite. At the Fortress of Sanctuary, the Worldkillers work to bring about a total eclipse, which will render Kara powerless permanently. Grace is dead, but Sam and Julia are still fighting to remember their human lives and stop the Worldkillers from taking control. Kara asks James to make sure Lena does not possess more Kryptonite, but James decides to take Lena's word. Brainiac 5 broadcasts Supergirl's, Alex's, and Lena's minds into Juru, a Kryptonian valley, where they track down Sam and Julia. Sam is reminded of Ruby, which prompts her to retake control of her body on Earth. Sam activates a location beacon for the DEO just as Brainiac pulls Supergirl, Alex, and Lena out of Juru. Reign takes back control as the DEO arrives in the Legion ship. A fight culminates in Julia (awakened by Alex) and Pestilence killing each other and Reign absorbing their powers, causing the fortress to collapse. James tells Lena he is Guardian and that Supergirl asked him to confirm there was no more Kryptonite. Lena admits that she made the Kryptonite herself. Reign decides to go after Ruby.
60	18	"Shelter from the Storm"	Antonio Negret	Story by : Robert Rovner; Teleplay by : Lindsay Gelfand & Allison Weintraub	May 14, 2018	T13.20668	1.53
Lena and James are attacked by Reign at Lena's place. Lena uses Kryptonite against Reign, which forces Reign to retreat. However, Lena learns about Reign's hunt to kill Ruby. The Legion's members prepare for return to their time. Lena tells Supergirl and Alex about Lex's mansion, where she had arranged for Ruby's stay. Alex visits Ruby to keep her company. Supergirl and J'onn visits Sam's mother to keep her safe from Reign and to set a trap for her when she comes looking for Ruby there. However, Reign kills Sam's mother. Supergirl and J'onn discover that Reign now has the powers of all three Worldkillers. Reign attacks Alex and Ruby at the mansion, leading the latter to discover her mother's split personality. Mon-El stays behind to help Supergirl. They are able to capture Reign with the help of Kryptonite created by Lena. Later, Alex comforts Ruby following the revelation; Ruby now fears for her mother and herself, knowing that she is Reign's child. Lena tells Kara that Supergirl crossed a line by using her personal relationship with James and she will never trust her again, leading Kara to be abashed of her actions and doubting her ethics.
61	19	"The Fanatical"	Mairzee Almas	Paula Yoo & Eric Carrasco	May 21, 2018	T13.20669	1.47
Kara and James discuss Lena's mistrust of Supergirl and keeping secret identities. Tanya, a Coville follower, brings Coville's personal journal for James to give to Supergirl. Mon-El and Kara find remnants of a nuclear explosion at the cult's last location. The cult kidnaps Tanya from CatCo, pursued by Guardian. In the ensuing fight, Olivia, the cult's new leader, shoots off James' mask and the cult escapes after the police arrive; the cult later demands Tanya and the journal from James, threatening to reveal Guardian's secret identity. From Coville's journal, Kara realizes the cult is trying to make a new Worldkiller using Harun-El, a black Kryptonite. Mon-El purposefully gets kidnapped by the cult as Tanya turns herself over to them. As Olivia starts the ritual to transform herself into a Worldkiller, Mon-El sends a signal for Supergirl to locate them. After a brief fight, Supergirl reasons with Olivia enough for her to give up the desire to be a Worldkiller. Winn and Lena find more of the Harun-El, which can be used to help Sam, on a meteor; Mon-El and Kara fly J'onn's spaceship to travel there.
62	20	"Dark Side of the Moon"	Hanelle Culpepper	Derek Simon & Katie Rose Rogers	May 28, 2018	T13.20670	1.57
Kara and Mon-El reach the meteor and discover there is a city on it. They are attacked by caretaker droids, but use disguises to blend in while traveling through the city towards the rock. Alex is attacked while spending time with Ruby. She initially suspects it is the killer sheriff she and Kara helped capture ten years ago until a second attempt is made on her life. Kara realizes the meteor is a surviving part of Krypton, Argo City, and discovers her mother is alive. Alura arranges for a meeting of their High Council to discuss the issue of the Harun-El, as it is used to sustain the life and security of the city. Kara manages to convince the members of the High Council to give her a small quantity of it to defeat Reign. Alex and J'onn set a trap for Alex's assassin by having J'onn pose as Alex, but the man targets the real Alex before she captures him. Later Selena, a High Council member, is revealed to be a Dark Priestess. Kara and Mon-El arrive back at L-Corp just as Reign's increasing immunity to Lena's Kryptonite allows her to escape containment.
63	21	"Not Kansas"	Dermott Downs	Gabriel Llanas & Anna Musky-Goldwyn	June 4, 2018	T13.20671	1.83
Kara and Mon-El fight Reign as Lena creates an antidote from the Harun-El. Once injected, Reign separates from Sam and disintegrates. Sam reunites with Ruby at the DEO and Kara asks Lena to artificially reproduce the black rock for Argo City. Kara decides to return to Argo City to be with Alura and she invites Mon-El to join her. Winn and James discover a gun from the DEO is being used on the street as they monitor National City's security for Kara. James and J'onn learn the gun manufacturer sold a version of the DEO weapon to the general public and J'onn later mandates that the DEO switch to non-lethal weaponry. Back in Argo, Kara and Mon-El talk about their feelings for each other, but are interrupted by a woman who has been following Kara. She identifies herself as a Dark Priestess and Selena as her High Priestess. M'yrnn and J'onn discuss performing the Reach, a Martian ritual for an elder to pass on all memories to a younger family member. Kara and Mon-El discover that Selena and the other priestesses stole their ship and Coville joins them when they arrive on Earth, leaving Kara and Mon-El trapped on Argo.
64	22	"Make it Reign"	Armen V. Kevorkian	Ray Utarnachitt & Cindy Lichtman	June 11, 2018	T13.20672	1.76
Coville, Selena, and the other Kryptonians begin a ritual at the Fortress of Sanctuary to summon Reign back to Earth. However, her body will not completely form and Selena determines they require blood from Pestilence and Purity. Sam undergoes testing at the DEO and M'yrnn and J'onn begin the Reach. Kara uses Alura's hologram crystal to contact Winn and explain Selena's plan to conquer Earth. Winn replicates a portal in the DEO as Mon-El fixes the one on Argo to travel between Argo and National City. The Kryptonians break into the DEO to locate the Worldkillers' blood. Kara, Alura, and Mon-El travel back to Earth to join the fight and the Kryptonians leave once they possess the blood. They complete the ritual, but Selena kills Coville. Lena determines that, as Reign gets stronger, Sam gets weaker. Alura reveals there is a fountain that can strengthen Sam and weaken Reign; Sam travels to Juru to find it. Reign begins traveling to the Earth's core with the sword of Juru to xenoform Earth into a new Krypton, setting off earthquakes.
65	23	"Battles Lost and Won"	Jesse Warn	Robert Rovner & Jessica Queller	June 18, 2018	T13.20673	1.78
As the earthquakes worsen, Supergirl, Alura, Guardian, and the DEO protect National City; Imra and Brainiac 5 return to help. M'yrnn gives J'onn one final memory before merging with the Earth to stop the xenoforming; the heroes defeat the priestesses. Sam finds the fountain in Juru and makes peace with her mother. She drinks from the fountain and defeats Reign using the sword. However, this leads to Sam, Mon-El, and Alura dying, so Supergirl goes back in time and changes the outcome of their fight using the Harun-El. Brainiac 5 decides to stay on present-day Earth because a distant relative has started wiping out all other AI and asks Winn to take his place with the Legion. Winn accepts his offer and travels to the future with Mon-El. J'onn steps down from the DEO and promotes Alex as director. Offscreen, James publicly confesses that he is Guardian. Kara decides to stay on Earth instead of returning to Argo with her mother. Sam, completely rid of her Kryptonian side, returns to her life with Ruby. Lena gives Alura all of the Harun-El and a mathematical formula to create more, but synthesizes a portion for secret experiments. A duplicate Kara appears in Siberia at the same time Reign is defeated with the Harun-El. This episode marks Jeremy Jordan's final episode as a series regular.

== Cast and characters ==
=== Main ===
- Melissa Benoist as Kara Danvers / Kara Zor-El / Supergirl
- Mehcad Brooks as James Olsen / Guardian
- Chyler Leigh as Alex Danvers
- Jeremy Jordan as Winslow "Winn" Schott Jr.
- Katie McGrath as Lena Luthor
- Odette Annable as Samantha Arias / Reign
- Chris Wood as Mon-El / Mike Matthews
- David Harewood as J'onn J'onzz / Martian Manhunter

=== Recurring ===
- Erica Durance as Alura Zor-El
- Emma Tremblay as Ruby Arias
- Adrian Pasdar as Morgan Edge
- Floriana Lima as Maggie Sawyer
- Andrea Brooks as Eve Teschmacher
- Carl Lumbly as M'yrnn J'onzz
- Chad Lowe as Thomas Coville
- Amy Jackson as Imra Ardeen / Saturn Girl
- Jesse Rath as Querl Dox / Brainiac 5
- Anjali Jay as Selena

=== Guest ===
- Lynda Carter as U.S. President Olivia Marsdin
- Calista Flockhart as Cat Grant
- David. St. Lewis as Robert DuBois / Bloodsport
- Yael Grobglas as Gayle Marsh / Psi
- Sharon Leal as M'gann M'orzz / Miss Martian
- Helen Slater as Eliza Danvers
- Carlos Bernard as Oscar Rodas
- Betty Buckley as Patricia Arias
- Sofia Vassilieva as Olivia
- Curtis Lum as Agent Demos
- Brit Morgan as Leslie Willis / Livewire
- Sarah Douglas as Jindah Kol Rozz
- Brenda Strong as Lillian Luthor
- Laurie Metcalf as Mrs. Schott
- Brooke Smith as Jacqueline Nimball
- Nesta Cooper as Tanya
- Tim Russ as Jul-Us
- Bradley White as Arthur Willis
- Esmé Bianco as Thara Ak-Var
- Benjamin Goas as Val
- Kerry Sandomirsky as Felra
- Todd Thomson as Lir-Al
- Rosemary Hoschchild as Vita

==== "Crisis on Earth-X" ====
- Stephen Amell as Oliver Queen / Green Arrow and Oliver Queen / Dark Arrow (Earth-X)
  - Amell also portrays Dark Arrow, Oliver's Earth-X counterpart
- Victor Garber as Professor Martin Stein / Firestorm
- Jesse L. Martin as Joe West
- Emily Bett Rickards as Felicity Smoak
- Caity Lotz as Sara Lance
- Tom Cavanagh as Harrison "Harry" Wells (Earth-2)
  - Cavanagh also portrays Eobard Thawne / Reverse-Flash
- Dominic Purcell as Mick Rory / Heat Wave
- Candice Patton as Iris West
- Franz Drameh as Jefferson Jackson / Firestorm
- Danielle Panabaker as Caitlin Snow and Killer Frost
- Carlos Valdes as Cisco Ramon
- Grant Gustin as Barry Allen / Flash
- Keiynan Lonsdale as Wally West
- Patrick Sabongui as David Singh
- Isabella Hofmann as Clarissa Stein
- Christina Brucato as Lily Stein
- Danielle Nicolet as Cecile Horton
- Jessica Parker Kennedy as caterer (Note: Identified later on The Flash as Nora West-Allen.)

== Production ==
=== Development ===
On January 8, 2017, The CW renewed Supergirl for a third season. Series co-creator Ali Adler decided not to return as showrunner for season 3, and instead remained as a consultant. Jessica Queller and Robert Rovner served as the showrunners alongside series co-creator Andrew Kreisberg.

=== Writing ===
Jessica Queller described the theme of the season as being "What does it mean to be human?". Robert Rovner and Queller also said that the season would continue to explore Lena Luthor's struggle with her family's legacy, with Rovner explaining, "I think one of the central issues about Lena is that she comes from this family of bad guys and I think her journey is – and we've see her grapple with it in Season 2 – is she on the side of good or is she on the side of bad?". The season also sees Alex Danvers breaking up with Maggie Sawyer, who she met in season two. Kreisberg said the writers chose Alex wanting children and Maggie not wanting them as the reason for the breakup since he felt it was a "true human experience", considering that some employees in the writer's room broke up with their lovers because of differing views over wanting children. He also said that despite the breakup, Alex and Maggie still love each other, evident by them sleeping together after breaking up. The season also sees Kara Danvers / Supergirl and Mon-El again parting ways; Queller compared this separation to that of Humphrey Bogart and Ingrid Bergman's characters in the ending of Casablanca (1942), saying, "They both have destinies in different times as heroes. What they did was the sort-of Casablanca decision of putting what's most important to them – which is saving the world – first."

=== Casting ===
Main cast members Melissa Benoist, Mehcad Brooks, Chyler Leigh, Jeremy Jordan, Chris Wood and David Harewood return from previous seasons in their respective roles as Kara, James Olsen, Alex, Winn Schott, Mon-El and J'onn J'onzz / Martian Manhunter. They are joined by Katie McGrath and Odette Annable, playing Lena Luthor and Samantha Arias / Reign, respectively. McGrath was promoted from her recurring status in season two. Floriana Lima, who portrayed Maggie Sawyer as a regular in season two, was demoted to a recurring role in season three as Lima wanted to pursue other opportunities. She had been contracted only for one season (the second), but agreed to appear in five episodes of the third season. This is also the final season to feature Wood, who Rovner said was intended to appear in only two seasons. Jordan too exited the series as a regular with this season, as he wanted to begin "a new chapter in [his] life".

=== Filming ===
Filming for the season began on July 6, 2017, and ended on April 28, 2018, taking place in Vancouver.

=== Arrowverse tie-ins ===
In May 2017, The CW president Mark Pedowitz officially announced plans for a four-show Arrowverse crossover event, crossing over episodes of the television series Supergirl, The Flash, Legends of Tomorrow, and Arrow. The crossover, Crisis on Earth-X, began with Supergirl and a special airing of Arrow on November 27, 2017, and concluded on The Flash and Legends of Tomorrow on November 28. The crossover also sees Benoist, Brooks and Jordan playing the Earth-X versions of their characters.

== Release ==
=== Broadcast ===
The season premiered on The CW in the United States on October 9, 2017, and ended on June 18, 2018. It premiered on October 16, 2017, in the United Kingdom on Sky One.

=== Home media ===
The season was released on DVD on September 17, 2018, and Blu-ray on September 18, 2018.

== Reception ==
=== Ratings ===
Viewership and ratings per episode of Supergirl season 3
No.	Title	Air date	Rating/share (18–49)	Viewers (millions)	DVR (18–49)	DVR viewers (millions)	Total (18–49)	Total viewers (millions)
1	"Girl of Steel"	October 9, 2017	0.5/2	1.87	0.5	1.25	1.0	3.12
2	"Triggers"	October 16, 2017	0.5/2	1.76	0.4	1.23	0.9	2.98
3	"Far From the Tree"	October 23, 2017	0.5/2	1.76	0.4	1.02	0.9	2.78
4	"The Faithful"	October 30, 2017	0.5/2	1.82	0.4	1.14	0.9	2.96
5	"Damage"	November 6, 2017	0.5/2	1.87	0.5	1.14	1.0	3.01
6	"Midvale"	November 13, 2017	0.5/2	1.89	0.4	1.06	0.9	2.95
7	"Wake Up"	November 20, 2017	0.5/2	1.92	0.5	1.25	1.0	3.17
8	"Crisis on Earth-X, Part 1"	November 27, 2017	0.9/3	2.71	0.7	1.72	1.6	4.43
9	"Reign"	December 4, 2017	0.5/2	1.81	0.4	1.13	0.9	2.94
10	"Legion of Super-Heroes"	January 15, 2018	0.6/2	2.17	0.4	1.24	1.0	3.41
11	"Fort Rozz"	January 22, 2018	0.5/2	2.07	0.5	1.14	1.0	3.21
12	"For Good"	January 29, 2018	0.6/2	2.11	0.4	1.21	1.0	3.32
13	"Both Sides Now"	February 5, 2018	0.6/2	2.12	0.4	1.10	1.0	3.22
14	"Schott Through the Heart"	April 16, 2018	0.5/2	1.91	0.4	1.03	0.9	2.94
15	"In Search of Lost Time"	April 23, 2018	0.4/2	1.38	0.4	1.08	0.8	2.46
16	"Of Two Minds"	April 30, 2018	0.5/2	1.50	0.3	0.94	0.8	2.44
17	"Trinity"	May 7, 2018	0.5/2	1.60	0.3	0.95	0.8	2.55
18	"Shelter from the Storm"	May 14, 2018	0.5/2	1.53	0.4	0.97	0.9	2.50
19	"The Fanatical"	May 21, 2018	0.4/2	1.47	0.4	0.93	0.8	2.44
20	"Dark Side of the Moon"	May 28, 2018	0.4/2	1.57	0.5	1.11	0.9	2.68
21	"Not Kansas"	June 4, 2018	0.5/2	1.83	0.3	0.92	0.8	2.75
22	"Make it Reign"	June 11, 2018	0.4/2	1.76	0.4	0.97	0.8	2.73
23	"Battles Lost and Won"	June 18, 2018	0.5/2	1.78	0.4	1.01	0.9	2.79

=== Critical response ===
The review aggregator website Rotten Tomatoes gave the third season an 78% approval rating from critics with an average rating of 7.32/10, based on 289 reviews. The site's consensus reads, "Heavier themes lead to higher stakes, but Supergirl gives its eponymous heroine and her fellow supers plenty of room for growth, creating a well-balanced, engaging third season."

Jesse Schedeen of IGN rated the season premiere 7.5 out of 10, saying it "largely focusing on what's worked best for the show in the past – emphasizing Kara Danvers' never-ending struggle to balance her personal and superhero lives and the inspirational symbol Supergirl has become to National City", but added that "the lackluster debut of new villain Morgan Edge does little to suggest the series will improve on its perpetual villain woes". In his review of the season finale he said, "Supergirl's third season ended on a fairly mixed note. The season has taken a recent downturn thanks to the shift in focus regarding Reign and her mistresses, and [the season finale] wasn't able to repair that damage. However, it did benefit from some great, emotionally charged scenes and a generally strong emphasis on Kara and her supporting cast."

=== Accolades ===
Award nominations for Supergirl, season 3
Year	Award	Category	Nominee(s)	Result	Ref.
2018	People's Choice Awards	The Sci-Fi/Fantasy Show of 2018	Supergirl	Nominated	
2018	Saturn Awards	Best Actress on a Television Series	Melissa Benoist	Nominated	
2018	Saturn Awards	Best Superhero Adaptation Television Series	Supergirl	Nominated	
2018	Saturn Awards	Best Supporting Actress on Television	Odette Annable	Nominated	
2018	Teen Choice Awards	Choice Action TV Actor	Chris Wood	Nominated	
2018	Teen Choice Awards	Choice Action TV Actress	Melissa Benoist	Won	
2018	Teen Choice Awards	Choice Action TV Show	Supergirl	Nominated	
2018	Teen Choice Awards	Choice Scene Stealer	Katie McGrath	Nominated	
2018	Teen Choice Awards	Choice TV Villain	Odette Annable	Nominated	
2019	Leo Awards	Best Stunt Coordination in a Dramatic Series	Dustin Brooks, Simon Burnett, James Michalopoulos ("Shelter from the Storm")	Nominated	
