= List of Taken characters =

This is a list of characters from the American science-fiction television miniseries Taken.

== The Crawfords ==
=== Captain/Major/Lt. Colonel/Colonel Owen Crawford (died May 4, 1970) ===
Played by Joel Gretsch.
A captain who climbs the military ladder eventually to become a colonel in the United States Air Force, Owen happens across the crash site in Roswell, New Mexico on July 9, 1947. His ruthless qualities emerge, and he stops at nothing to learn the secrets of the visitors from outer space, even sacrificing his family. Owen tries to have an affair with Sally Clarke, until he is stopped by Jacob who makes Owen see his fears. Tom destroys Owen's career in an act of revenge, by sabotaging his alien investigations with fake crop signs. On May 4, 1970, Owen dies from a stroke after learning of the death of his son, Sam. In "John", Owen's granddaughter, Mary, sees a vision of him and she demands to know what Jacob Clarke did to scare him. Owen shows her by doing the same thing that Jacob showed him.

=== Anne Crawford (died October 28, 1962) ===
Played by Tina Holmes.
Anne is a warm-hearted woman who easily falls for Owen's charms. She eventually discovers that she was blissfully ignorant of the fact that he married her so he could advance up the ranks of the Air Force's alien project, then in the hands of her father, Col. Campbell. As a result, Anne's mental stability spirals, and meets a shocking fate: she is shot by her own husband, who makes it look like she was having an affair with Major Bowen.

=== Eric Crawford (c. 1949-2002) ===
Played by Andy Powers as Adult Eric, Nolan Funk as Teenage Eric, and Cody Shaer as Young Eric.
Not quite as ruthless as his father Owen, Eric is a confused, angry man who felt unloved by his parents, especially Owen. For this reason he becomes extremely jealous of his brother Sam. Eric inherits the extraterrestrial project from his father, after he blackmails the General into giving in to him using Owen's records. He gets close to Becky Clarke so he can find out the reason for Tom Clarke's change of opinion about the aliens, but gradually finds himself falling in love with Becky. He asks her to run away with him, but she decides to stay with her family instead, turning Eric even more bitter. Eric loses the project after the aliens take all the proof away until an incident with a space mission puts him back on the job. Eric's past and his obsession with the project and with discovering what proof Tom Clarke is hiding leave him estranged with his wife Julie, and his relationship with his daughter Mary gradually turns to ice, with tragic results: he is killed under orders from his daughter.

=== Sam Crawford (July 28, 1951 - April 18, 1970) ===
Played by Ryan Merriman as Adult Sam, Branden Nadon as Young Sam, and Trevor Pawson as Younger Sam.
The kind and understanding Sam grows up to be a young journalist. He is always dismissive of his father and brother's projects. That is until he happens across a newspaper article about an ancient Inuit ruin, whose symbols resemble those on the piece of metal Owen keeps in his personal safe. Sam embarks on a journey to Alaska to find the truth, with fatal consequences.

=== Julie Crawford ===
Played by Emily Holmes.
Julie thought that the Eric she married was the perfect man, but the life she envisions crumbles. Her relationship with her daughter, Mary, however, is very strong, although she doesn't realize how much Mary has inherited from her grandfather.

=== Mary Crawford (born April 27, 1970) ===
Played by Heather Donahue as Adult Mary, and Anysha Berthot as Young Mary.
Owen's monstrous legacy is carried onto his granddaughter, Mary. Although her relationship with her mother is strong, she feels estranged by her father, Eric. An outstanding student in biochemistry, Mary jumps on board Eric's project, making several major breakthroughs in association with fellow scientist and secret lover Dr. Chet Wakeman. Mary coldbloodedly experiments on several of the 'taken', and relentlessly hunts down the current generation of the Keys and the Clarkes - especially Allie. She is eventually arrested for her crimes.

== The Clarkes ==
=== Sally Clarke (died October 19, 1980) ===
Played by Catherine Dent.
Sally is a lonely woman, since her husband Fred is always out of town. When she meets John, her life is turned upside down, and they form a special bond, even though they know each other briefly. She becomes pregnant with Jacob, a human-alien hybrid. Years later after Jacob's birth, Owen Crawford comes to search for Jacob. He uses Sally to get closer to Jacob. She falls for Crawford's charm but discovers his real intentions later on.

=== Fred Clarke ===
Played by Alf Humphreys.
Fred is Sally's husband. Fred was constantly away on business, and his relationships with his wife and children were strained considerably. He had died by 1958.

=== Tom Clarke ===
Played by Ryan Hurst as Adult Tom, and Kevin Schmidt as Young Tom.
The son of Sally and Fred, Tom was always skeptical of his mother's belief in aliens from outer space, and makes it his life-long quest to debunk alien theories wherever they spread. After Owen Crawford destroys Sally's life, Tom swore to ruin his. He doesn't stop with Owen; he is a constant obstacle to Eric Crawford's research. He changes his alien-sceptic views when he realizes his brother Jacob is half-alien and devotes his life to uncovering and spreading the truth about the alien sightings as a best-seller writer. He tries to protect his niece Lisa from the Crawfords. Tom is the only major character to survive the entire length of the series.

=== Becky Clarke ===
Played by Chad Morgan as Adult Becky, and Shauna Kain as Young Becky.
Traditionally fiercely protective of her younger brother Jacob, Becky breaks it when she finds herself falling in love with Eric Crawford and becomes his lover, but in the end she decides to not leave her husband and children for him. Her relationship with her family is strained ever since.

=== Jacob Clarke (February 1948 - March 17, 1981) ===
Played by Anton Yelchin as Young Jacob, and Chad Donella as Adult Jacob.
Young Jacob is an alien-human hybrid, growing up he was always different from all the other children. Shy and anti-social, he was bullied. That all changes when he demonstrates his vast psychic powers. Jacob, or Jack, as he is known by friends and relatives, is wise beyond his years, and has a powerful telepathic insight he inherited from his alien father, John. When necessary, Jacob can overload adversaries with memories of both their greatest fears and futures, driving them temporarily insane. These abilities come at a cost; overusing them exhausts him greatly, risking death. Eventually, his powers debilitate his health and take his life.

=== Carol Clarke ===
Played by Sadie Lawrence.
Carol is a kind woman who married Jacob, not realizing that part of him is from another world. After Jacob dies, she remarries to Danny Holding.

=== Lisa Clarke (born 1972) ===
Played by Emily Bergl as Adult Lisa, Alexandra Purvis as Lisa, age 13, and Taylor-Anne Reid as Lisa, age 8.
Despite being the daughter of a half-alien, she doesn't inherit any of his more unusual qualities. However, she is protected from the Crawfords by the aliens, and they save her from death, when she gives birth to Allison (Allie). Lisa meets Charlie Keys on board the spaceship when he gets abducted. They conceive Allie on the spaceship, having no memories of their meeting outside of the spaceship. Later, Lisa finds that she has a psychic link with her daughter. As a teenager, Lisa likes to wear a Hüsker Dü t-shirt from the Metal Circus era. Her comment to Nina about seeing Hüsker Dü "last year" in Sacramento indicates she would have been to the 27 Feb 1985 show.

=== Allison "Allie" Clarke (born June 8, 1993) ===
Played by Dakota Fanning as Allie, and Dakota’s younger sister Elle Fanning as Allie, age 3.
Although her mother (Lisa Clarke) didn't inherit Jacob's alien abilities, Allie did. Allie is somewhat wise beyond her years and has the ability to not only read minds, but can also manipulate time and space, warp reality, and has healed her father Charlie. Allie is the centerpiece of the aliens' experiments, but not even she knows what lies in store for her. She is also taken by Mary Crawford and then by the army, who use her as a bait to lure the aliens into a trap. But she deceives them all and escapes with her parents. In the end, however, she has to leave with the aliens to save everyone. But she leaves behind a promise to return.

== The Keys ==
=== Captain Russell Keys (died October 24, 1962) ===
Played by Steve Burton.
Braving the deadly skies above France as a B-17 bomber Captain in August 1944, Russell and his crew are abducted by aliens disguised as German doctors. After dispatching the aliens, Russell is never the same when he comes home. The aliens are interested in him and his descendants because most people who come into contact with their technology get sick and eventually die (such as the rest of his B-17 crew), but his physiology is more tolerant to it. Upon discovering that his comrades had died, he leaves his family to become a drifter, hoping the aliens never find him. Alas, he is proved wrong, and is taken several times and experimented on, and both he and his son Jesse eventually discover the implants in their brains. Russell tries to defend Jesse from the aliens, but his continuing failures and resulting frustration, combined with Jesse's advice, drive him to approach Owen Crawford and offer up his implant, despite knowing its removal would kill him, in exchange for Jesse's protection. Owen agrees, and Russell is taken to a secret surgery headed by Air Force doctors led by Doctor Kreutz. Russell, noticing Owen isn't present, realizes he has been betrayed, but is physically overpowered, forced into unconsciousness, and operated on. The negative effects of the implant drive all present insane and cause them to kill each other; one soldier shoots several oxygen tanks, which explode and destroy the entire building, killing all including Russell. Jesse suffers immense emotional guilt of his father's death, and when the abductions centered on him, the aliens summoned an image of Russell to force an emotional response as part of their experiment.

=== Kate Keys ===
Played by Julie Benz.
After anxiously waiting for Russell's return from Europe, Kate is saddened to find he comes home a changed man. She is constantly concerned about his state of mind, and is worried that he can't tell her what's been haunting him for so long. After Russell flees, she divorces him and remarries to Sheriff Bill Walker.

=== Jesse Keys (1946 – September 1992) ===
Played by Desmond Harrington as Adult Jesse, James Kirk as Teen Jesse, and Conner Widdows as Young Jesse.
The son of Russell and Kate, Jesse always admired his father for his heroism during the Second World War. Jesse finds himself taken by visitors from outer space, and each abduction sends him into a spiral of depression, anxiety, and rage. He is particularly traumatized by his experiences in Vietnam, when the aliens save him from a burning Buddhist temple, but let 27 of his comrades die. He becomes a heroin addict after the war, but is rehabilitated by a nurse named Amelia. Jesse tries to protect his son, Charlie, from being abducted, but to no avail. Ultimately, his experiences result in him being committed to a mental hospital until his death.

=== Amelia Keys ===
Played by Julie Ann Emery.
Amelia meets Jesse in the hospital where she works. She takes care of him and helps him overcome his addiction to drugs. However, she is concerned by Jesse's increasingly erratic behavior, especially towards their son, Charlie. Amelia finally believes Jesse when Eric Crawford's agents come after him, and she leads Charlie to live in obscurity.

=== Charlie Keys (born 1971) ===
Played by Adam Kaufman as Adult Charlie, and Devin Douglas Drewitz as Teen Charlie.
Like his father Jesse, Charlie is tormented by his abductions by the aliens. Despite that, he has an intriguing experience with Lisa Clarke while abducted, and the two share a special bond. Charlie was a school teacher, but his desire to expose the aliens' activities render him jobless, and is forced to run from the government. He meets Lisa in real life when he's studying Dr. Penzler's abductees group. After he and Lisa go through hypnotherapy, he discovers that Allie is his daughter and tries to keep her safe.

== Other characters ==
Alien Visitor 'John

Played by Eric Close.
When 'John's' alien spacecraft crashes in the New Mexico desert near Roswell, killing his companions, he assumes the form of a human. He falls in love with Sally Clarke, and gives her a child, Jacob. John leaves shortly afterward, but the two have a special bond. Sally Clarke gives him one of her star earrings. Jacob helps his mother see him again on her deathbed. He returns later to help his great-granddaughter, Allie. He teaches her to block her signal and he tells her that, unless she calls them, they wouldn't be able to find her, just before he leaves to protect them.

General Beers

Played by James McDaniel.
A high-ranking officer in the US Army, General Beers shuts down Mary Crawford and Dr. Wakeman's FBI alien project. He moves operations to North Dakota, in a bid to lure the aliens into a trap, using Allie as bait. His plan seems to succeed when the UFO crashes, but it turns out it was Allie who deceived them.

Lieutenant/Captain/Major Howard Bowen (died October 28, 1962)

Played by Jason Gray-Stanford.
One of Col. Owen Crawford's two closest lackeys. He is killed by Owen during his scheme to deal with his wife, Anne.

Col. Thomas Campbell

Played by Michael Moriarty.
An Army Air Corps Colonel in the intelligence division and Capt. Owen Crawford's superior. He takes control of everything related to the Roswell crash and leaves Crawford out of it. Crawford then seduces and marries his daughter Anne and blackmails Campbell into assigning him as head of the project. After losing the project to Crawford, he became a heavy drinker and died of cirrhosis of the liver prior to October 1962.

Dewey Clayton

Played by Timothy Webber.
A local hunting guide in North Dakota that Charlie and Lisa hire to find Allie after the US Army shuts down the road that leads to the area they have Allie in. He is shocked to find out about the aliens.

Doctor "Doc" Schilling

Played by Jay Brazeau. He is only seen for a short time during the series.

Gladys and Mavis Erenberg (died December 25, 1958)

Played by Carol Infield Sender and Helen Infield Sender.
Gladys and Mavis are the famed Erenberg twins, and they're psychically linked to each other. They are taken to New Mexico as guinea pigs in Owen Crawford and Dr. Kreutz's alien program. They demonstrate their abilities when one of the twins visualizes a bunch of flowers, while the other draws a mentally accurate depiction. Crawford and Kreutz hope the Erenburg twins could fly the alien ship that crashed near Roswell. But those who enter the base don't come out alive: colonel Crawford intentionally makes them stay in the ship, thus exposing them to enough energy to kill them - a property of the alien technology that was already known.

Lieutenant/Captain/Major/Lieutenant Colonel Marty Erickson

Played by John Hawkes.
The second of Col. Owen Crawford's two closest lackeys. He suspected Col. Crawford killed his wife and Captain Bowen, but only told Eric several years later after the Colonel's death. Eric got him arrested as accomplice of the crime.

Dr. Ellen Greenspan

Played by Brenda James.
A doctor in Jacob's school that saves him when Bowen and Erickson came after him.

Dr. Helms

Played by Andrew Johnston.

Danny Holding

Played by Byron Lucas.
A musician neighbor of Carol Clarke who often babysits Lisa and eventually becomes Carol's second husband.

Nina Toth

Played by Camille Sullivan (adult) and Brittney Irvin (teenager).
Best friend of Lisa since their teenager years at school and shares a love of the music of Hüsker Dü.

Lieutenant Lou Johnson (died July 1947)

Played by Ryan Robbins.

Dr. Kreutz (died October 24, 1962)

Played by Willie Garson.
Formerly an aerospace engineer for the Nazis, Dr. Kreutz escaped to America after the end of World War II. He comes to work under Colonel Crawford after the Roswell landings in 1947. Dr. Kreutz is a rather stern and cold man, and offhandedly sacrifices test subjects. He is killed in an explosion along with the mad victims of the experiment on Russell Keys.

Lester (died April 18, 1970)
Played by Frederick Koehler.
Up in the frozen forests of Alaska, dwells Lester. He is an alien-human hybrid, but unlike Jacob Clarke, he was born horribly deformed more alien outside than inside. Lester has the appearance of a mutated human-alien, he has the bone-chilling psychic ability to kill whoever looks him in the eye. Absolutely terrified of himself, he hides in a small shack in the woods. He builds an Inuit-inspired tomb for his dead twin brother (who was also deformed), hoping to revive him with magic. Lester and his twin brother are failed experiments of the aliens, and therefore of no importance.

Patricia
Played by Janet Wright.

Dr. Harriet Penzler (died 2002)
Played by Gabrielle Rose.
A psychological counselor, Dr. Penzler is engrossed by hearing the experiences of the 'taken', and has opened a therapy group so abductees can talk about their experiences. She also uses hypnosis on the members of the group to recollect their memories. However, some of the members of the group find their confidence in her testing. She is killed by a government agent while hypnotizing Lisa to help her find Allie.

Lieutenant Pierce
Played by Michael Soltis.
A young soldier that takes care of Allie while she's under the US Army custody. He reads the Adventures of Huckleberry Finn to her. When the UFO crashes, he's one of the soldiers chosen to go inside. After Allie's deception is uncovered, he helps her and her parents escape.

Dr. Powell
Played by Terry Chen.

Dr. Quarrington
Played by Malcolm Stewart.

Ray
Played by Brian Markinson.
Ray is an angry and confused man who pretends that he was abducted by aliens, but was in fact a victim of child sexual abuse. He attempts to create a media spectacle by holding the therapy group hostage in a bid to prove to himself that is a sane man. Allie convinces him to surrender.

Sue (d. July 1947)
Played by Stacy Grant.
Captain Crawford's girlfriend, until he becomes interested in Anne, a marriage that could help his career. Sue finds a piece of alien technology and gives it to him. He promises her to rekindle their relationship, but he brutally kills her to marry Anne.

Private William Toland
Played by Jason Grayhm.

Sheriff Bill Walker
Played by Ian Tracey.
Second husband to Kate Keys.

Captain Walker
Played by Roger Cross.
One of the soldiers that guards Allie while in custody of the US Army. After the UFO crashes, he leads the soldiers chosen to go inside.

Dr. Chet Wakeman (died 2002)
Played by Matt Frewer.
Despite being a highly intelligent and rather blackly humorous character, Dr. Chet Wakeman can be rather sadistic. Wakeman, being a scientist, has a grossly childlike fascination with the aliens, and will sacrifice absolutely anything to have a share in the alien experience. As a result, he gleefully sentences test subjects - both human and animal - to their deaths in order to extract research data, and to satisfy his curiosity. Although he is Eric Crawford's friend, their friendship cools over the years, especially when Wakeman falls in love with Eric's daughter Mary. The two have an affair for several years, until she shoots him in the back when he tries to warn Charlie Keys and Lisa Clarke, killing him.

Lieutenant Williams
Played by Tobias Mehler.
One of the soldiers that guards Allie while in custody of the US Army. After the UFO crashes, he's one of the soldiers chosen to go inside.
