= Poor Paul =

- Genre: Telenovela
- Written by: Geoff Hoff & Steve Mancini
- Screenplay by: Sean Michael Beyer Adam Carbone
- Directed by: Sean Michael Beyer; Kevin G. Schmidt
- Starring: Zack Bennett; Kevin G. Schmidt; Samantha Droke
- Opening theme: "All That Really Matters" (Kendall Schmidt)
- Country of origin: United States
- Original language: English
- No. of seasons: 2
- No. of episodes: 43

Production
- Producers: Eye Scream Films; Yousef Abu-Taleb

Original release
- Network: Blip
- Release: 2008 – 2011

Poor Paul is a politically incorrect comedy web series that stars Kevin G. Schmidt, Samantha Droke, Wes Whitworth and Zack Bennett. It was aired between 2008 and 2011. The feature film version of Poor Paul was produced in 2021 and shot on location in Rhode Island and released in 2023.

== Summary ==
Poor Paul follows Paul and his college-aged roommates in an episodic comedy format.

Justin is annoyingly smart, Clyde is a neat freak and alcoholic, Bonnie is Clyde's sister who seems to like Paul, and Paul creates outrageous fantasies in order to escape life. Paul tries to deal with Justin's "I'm better-than-everyone" attitude and Clyde's obsessive, compulsive side. In Paul's fantasies he is always the hero – the only man in the universe who can save the day.

The show debuted in October 2008.

The second season of the show began in June 2009. Kimberly Wyatt and Jessica Lee Rose of lonelygirl15 joined the cast. The show was also a 2009 Webby Awards honoree for best writing.

== Cast ==
=== Main ===
- Zack Bennett as Paul
- Kevin G. Schmidt as Justin
- Nicholas Braun as Clyde
- Samantha Droke as Bonnie
- Richard Riehle as Grandpa Paul
- Kendall Schmidt as John
- Jessica Lee Rose as Beatrice (season 2)

=== Recurring ===
- Palmer Scott as Lloyd
- Sean Michael Beyer as Mr. Ted
- Whitmer Thomas as Patricia
- Floriana Lima as Fantasy Woman (season 1)
- Kimberly Wyatt as Siyotanka (season 2)

== Episodes ==
Season	Episodes	Originally released	
Season	Episodes	First released	Last released
1	22	September 16, 2008	March 17, 2009
2	21	June 23, 2009	March 8, 2011

== Season 1 ==
No.	Title	Directed by	Written by	Original release date	Prod. code
1	"Eat Your Seaweed"	Sean Michael Beyer	Unknown	September 16, 2008	101
“I’m trying to get along with my new roommates, but when Clyde brings a chick home, I gotta sleep on the couch.” — Paul
2	"You Look Good Naked"	Sean Michael Beyer	Unknown	September 16, 2008	102
“We kinda got into an argument over the bills, but then Clyde’s sis Bonnie shows up and Justin gets hella excited.” — Paul
3	"Cock Blocked"	Sean Michael Beyer	Unknown	September 23, 2008	103
“Justin tries to make a move on Bonnie, until he’s distracted by Clyde and his latest ’cause.’” — Paul
4	"We're Irish, Not Italian"	Sean Michael Beyer	Unknown	October 30, 2008	104
“My dad just shows up and tries to get me to move back home.” — Paul
5	"Two Generations of Sad"	Sean Michael Beyer	Unknown	October 6, 2008	105
“After my dad finally bounces, it gets crazy cuz Justin and Clyde give me a bunch of shit.” — Paul
6	"You Gonna Smoke That?"	Sean Michael Beyer	Unknown	October 14, 2008	106
“Me and Justin find out Clyde’s a major perv. Oh and my boss at work is a total dick.” — Paul
7	"A Rusty Trombone"	Sean Michael Beyer	Unknown	October 21, 2008	107
“Justin is tripping on me about money, but Clyde might get me a job where he works.” — Paul
8	"Chocha O'Clock"	Sean Michael Beyer	Unknown	October 28, 2008	108
“Bonnie is trying to help me chill, and I might get a job at Harry Palm’s Adult Emporium.” — Paul
9	"Halloween Special: Beer Pong!"	Kevin G. Schmidt	Unknown	October 31, 2008	109
“Justin and Clyde throw their annual Halloween party and think they can beat me and Bonnie in beer pong.” — Paul
10	"Rub & Tug"	Sean Michael Beyer	Unknown	November 4, 2008	110
“I went to see my dad. He’s such a dork. Oh and Justin and Clyde and I talk about how you would pay for hookers and stuff if the world didn’t have cash.” — Paul
11	"Paul's Sister?"	Sean Michael Beyer	Unknown	November 11, 2008	111
“Bonnie stops by while I’m soaking wet, Clyde gets in deep shit at the park and I get an unexpected visit.” — Paul
12	"Paul's BroSter?"	Sean Michael Beyer	Unknown	November 18, 2008	112
“Patricia shows up just to bust my balls! WTF?” — Paul
13	"Plymouth Rock Red"	Sean Michael Beyer	Unknown	November 27, 2008	113
“Bonnie invited me and my dad and Patricia over for Thanksgiving dinner, but we got kinda distracted along the way.” — Paul
14	"Roadie"	Sean Michael Beyer	Unknown	December 2, 2008	114
“My dad took us on a road trip to show me where he and my mom first, you know… which is just gross… but he got us lost.” — Paul
15	"It's a Poor Paul Christmas: Part 1"	Sean Michael Beyer	Unknown	December 24, 2008	115
“I invited Bonnie and Clyde and Justin to my crazy Grandpa’s place in the mountains. What was I thinking?” — Paul
16	"It's a Poor Paul Christmas: Part 2"	Sean Michael Beyer	Unknown	December 25, 2008	116
“After we opened presents and stuff, the power goes out. Then later we all chilled in Grandpa’s hot tub. Oh and Bonnie’s kinda cool, you know?” — Paul
17	"I Know a Guy"	Sean Michael Beyer	Unknown	January 6, 2009	117
“Me and Justin and Clyde went to New York, cuz I won a free trip on the radio. And my cousin Tony who lives there showed us around. Tony didn’t look like a hit man the last time I saw him.” — Paul
18	"Shrooms"	Sean Michael Beyer	Unknown	January 13, 2009	118
“Bonnie helps me get a new job. And then Clyde and Justin want to take ME on a trip!” — Paul
19	"'Eff Ups"	Sean Michael Beyer	Unknown	February 3, 2009	119
As shocking as it may seem, even the cast of Poor Paul ‘effs up once in a while!
20	"From the Heart"	Sean Michael Beyer	Unknown	February 14, 2009	120
21	"Q&A: Part 1"	Sean Michael Beyer	Unknown	March 10, 2009	121
Everything you could possibly want to know about Poor Paul and weren't afraid to ask! The cast, director and writers answer the questions all y'all submitted.
22	"Q&A: Part Deux"	Sean Michael Beyer	Unknown	March 17, 2009	122
The answers to all your burning questions and then some.

== Season 2 ==
No.	Title	Directed by	Written by	Original release date	Prod. code
1	"Where the Hell Is Paul?"	Sean Michael Beyer	Unknown	June 23, 2008	201
2	"Big Hands"	Sean Michael Beyer	Unknown	June 30, 2008	202
3	"What Did You Do, Wear His Underwear?"	Sean Michael Beyer	Unknown	July 7, 2008	203
4	"There's a Fire Down Below"	Sean Michael Beyer	Unknown	July 14, 2008	204
5	"The Body's Not Even Cold"	Sean Michael Beyer	Unknown	July 21, 2008	205
6	"Fiesta del Amor"	Sean Michael Beyer	Unknown	July 28, 2008	206
7	"Women!"	Sean Michael Beyer	Unknown	August 4, 2008	207
8	"When the Walls Come Crumbling Down"	Sean Michael Beyer	Unknown	August 11, 2008	208
9	"Times Are a Changin'"	Sean Michael Beyer	Unknown	August 25, 2008	209
10	"You're a Guy"	Sean Michael Beyer	Unknown	September 1, 2008	210
11	"Laissez-les bon temps roulez"	Sean Michael Beyer	Unknown	September 8, 2008	211
12	"At One with Nature: Part One"	Sean Michael Beyer	Unknown	September 15, 2008	212
