= The Secret Lives of Fortunate Wives =

2005 novel by Sarah Strohmeyer

- Author: Sarah Strohmeyer
- Language: English
- Publisher: Dutton Adult
- Publication date: September 22, 2005
- Publication place: United States
- Media type: Print (Hardcover)
- Pages: 368 ppg
- ISBN: 0525949097

The Secret Lives of Fortunate Wives is a 2005 novel by Sarah Strohmeyer. It was published on September 22, 2005 by Dutton Adult.

== Plot summary ==
In the luxurious neighborhood of Hunting Hills, Ohio, Marti Dench realizes her husband is never around and suspects he is having an affair. At the same time, John Harding comes back from Prague with a new wife who is far from the normal size two socialites of Hunting Hill. The instant Marti hears John, a long time friend, is newly married, she experiences jealousy and believes that John is the real love of her life. She then sets out to seduce John and begin an affair with him.

John's new (and second) wife, Clare Stark, has difficulty settling into life at Hunting Hills. Once a hot-shot journalist, Claire is now forced to be a stay-at-home wife, as her new husband has a bad history with the only newspaper in town, and Claire has a romantic history with the chief editor of that paper. The other wives aren't so welcoming, and John's mother disapproves of Claire. Claire befriends Marti, who goes out of her way to invite Claire to their exclusive book club and throws a party in Claire and John's honour, but (unbeknownst to Claire) only as a ploy to get John into bed. Claire, none the wiser, continues to try to make friends with the other Hunting Hills wives.

At Claire's first book club meeting, one of the wives, Karen Goss, calls for help from the police station. As everyone except Claire has been drinking, Claire drives down with Marti and Boots, John's ex-wife, to help her out. At the police station, Karen confesses that she is confused about her sexuality, a result of her husband's forcing her to commit sexual acts with other women. In an intimate rendezvous with her husband's secretary in Edgewater Park, Karen became the victim of a hate crime against homosexuals and was taken down to the police station to give a statement. She does not want to humiliate her family, and so begs Claire to pull strings with Eric Schmaltz, the editor of the Cleveland Citizen newspaper, so that her name will not appear in the papers.

Claire agrees to help Karen, but in a meeting with Eric, she is blackmailed into writing up an interview with a Hunting Hill wife who was convicted of manslaughter. Knowing how much her husband hates the idea of her writing for the Cleveland Citizen, Claire devises a plan to get back at Eric for the blackmailing.

Meanwhile, Jim Denton, Marti's husband, is caught in a compromising situation with Lisa, Marti's best friend, with whom Jim is having an affair. Having taken four Viagra pills, Jim's erection refuses to die down, and he misses his meeting with an important client at the last minute. The client, Marguerite, is insulted at being stood up and withdraws all her money from the investment company where Jim works. It is revealed that Jim had been forging account statements to all his friends who invested with him, and with Marguerite's money gone, they are all essentially broke.

At the party Marti is throwing for them, Claire gets roped into a boring conversation with Karen's husband, while Marti gets John alone in the library. Marti throws herself at John, who feels something for her but refuses her advances and leaves. Jim Denton arrives at the party, and Marti instantly forgets her rejection as she welcomes back her AWOL husband. While talking to Jim, Karen's husband makes an inappropriate comment about Karen's sexuality, causing her to run off and leave Hunting Hills.

Jim's fraud is discovered by his boss and his friends, and he runs off, assuming the identity of an old fraternity brother. He divorces Marti over the phone, causing her to have a total breakdown. Marti calls John over to her house to comfort her, which he does. Claire arrives home in a celebratory mood after dropping off the article she wrote, which had no relevance to the subject Eric wanted (angering Eric, as he had planned to put it on the front page). She calls Boots to ask for a cooking tip, who lets it drop that John is over at Marti's house, and they're having an affair. Devastated, Claire falls asleep on the couch.

When she wakes up, John is standing over her holding the newspaper. He angrily asks why her name is on an article about Karen Goss, and Claire accuses him of cheating. They fight, and John storms out. Claire later bumps into Marti, who tells her that although she had wanted to seduce John that night, he completely rejected her and all he did was talk about how great Claire was. Claire and Marti soon bond over Marti's loss (of husband and money), and they set off to find Jim.

Seeing how hurt Claire is from her fight with John, Marti calls Eric and offers him an exclusive on her husband's fraud if he apologizes to Claire and John for deliberately placing Claire's name on an article she didn't have anything to do with. While Eric apologizes, Claire steps outside, only to be taken hostage by Jim, who's desperate to get the cops off his back. They wrestle, Jim's gun goes off, and luckily Claire is unharmed. All ends well as John and Claire make up, Jim gets sent to jail, and Marti gets an early inheritance from her dad.

== Characters ==
- Claire Stark- A reporter who became the second wife of John Harding
- John Harding- Claire Stark's husband
- Marti Denton- Hunting Hills wife who has her eyes set on John Harding
- Jim Denton- Marti's stockbroker husband, who was later convicted of fraud
- Boots- John Harding's ex-wife
- Karen Goss- Hunting Hills wife, who is confused about her sexuality
- Bob Goss- Karen's husband who forces her to have sex with other women, while he watches
- Lisa Renfew- Marti's best friend, who is sleeping with Jim Denton
- Ty Renfrew- Lisa's husband, who loses all his money to Jim
- Eric Schmaltz- Chief editor of the Cleveland Citizen, the only newspaper in town

== Reception ==
Reception for The Secret Lives of Fortunate Wives was generally positive, with Kirkus Reviews calling it "light and frothy". The Free Lance-Star cited Strohmeyer's portrayal of upper class privilege as a highlight, saying the book was "satisfying".
