= Lying to Be Perfect =

Television film

Lying to Be Perfect is a made-for-television movie from Lifetime based on the novel The Cinderella Pact by Sarah Strohmeyer.

== Plot ==
By day, Nola Devlin (Poppy Montgomery) is an unassuming, frumpy magazine editor who is overlooked and teased by her co-workers. When the sun sets and she is behind the glow and anonymity of her computer screen, she becomes the famous and reclusive advice columnist Belinda Apple. Nola's friends, tired of being overworked and overweight, band together to create the Cinderella Pact, vowing to lose weight by following the advice of their fairy godmother, Belinda Apple. She coincidentally meets Chip at her office for a ride. Later, she meets him often in different places and they become friends. She finds out that Chip's real name is Alex Stanson and that he is the son of Alex Stanson Sr. the owner of her publishing workplace. Alex and Nola fall in love. When her secret identity is threatened, Nola is forced to take her own alter egos advice. But, as her group of friends drop dress sizes, their real issues are exposed, and better-than-expected life changes begin to blossom. In the end she goes as Belinda Apple and reveals that Nola Devlin is in fact Belinda Apple. In the end Nola's dream car is leaving she took off her heels and one of the heels went into Chip's hand. Chip puts on Nola's heel and they kiss at midnight as the Cinderella storyline nears its end. Finally her book, called "The Cinderella Pact", is released with Nola Devlin as the author.

== Cast ==
- Poppy Montgomery as Nola Devlin
- Adam Kaufman as Alex Stanson Jr.
- Chelah Horsdal as Nancy
- Audrey Wasilewski as Deb
- Michelle Harrison as Lori
- Gabrielle Rose as Charlotte
