= Smart Girls Get What They Want =

2012 novel by Sarah Strohmeyer

- First edition
- Author: Sarah Strohmeyer
- Language: English
- Genre: Young adult
- Publisher: Balzer + Bray
- Publication date: June 26, 2012
- Publication place: United States
- Media type: Print (hardcover)
- Pages: 352 ppg
- ISBN: 0061953407

Smart Girls Get What They Want is a 2012 young adult fiction novel by Sarah Strohmeyer. It was published on June 26, 2012 by Balzer + Bray, an imprint of HarperCollins.

== Plot summary ==
High school students Gigi, Bea, and Neerja are best friends and overachievers. They aren't the most popular girls in school, but they aren't worried. They believe their "real" lives will begin once they get into Ivy League colleges. But on the day Neerja's sister goes off to Princeton, the girls realise that their pursuit of academic excellence is causing them to miss out on the full high school experience. They make a pact to stop being "nobodies," and get more involved with the school.

After Gigi aces a difficult chemistry test, she is accused of cheating as the typical jock sitting next to her, Mike, also aces the test. The principal decides to waive a suspension, however she forces Gigi to work on a chemistry project with Mike, where both parties have to contribute equally. Gigi blames Mike, thinking that he copied off her test, and Mike does nothing to deny this. The principal is also required to place a note in their permanent record stating that they were referred to her for cheating, which is a new rule set by the board.

This prompts Gigi to run for student rep and change the rules so as not to affect her chances of getting into an Ivy. However Gigi faces fierce competition from newcomer Will, who seems to have it all: looks, brains, and more money than he could spend in a lifetime. On top of everything, Will seems to have an interest in Gigi, causing her to lose track of what's really important.

But Gigi, Bea and Neerja all rally for her campaign, and Gigi gains more and more popularity. Along this journey, Gigi realises that she misjudged a lot of her classmates, particularly Mike, who turns out to be on par with Gigi's own academic excellence. Gigi eventually sees that Will is only using her as a substitute while on a long distance relationship with his girlfriend, Talia, and she stops falling for his games. From this, Gigi realises that her heart belongs to Mike, and the book ends with them getting together during the Crystal Ball. She also makes a deal with her principal, Dr. Schlutz, that her and Mike's record for cheating, are erased from their transcript.

== Characters ==
- Genevieve (Gigi) Dubois: An academically driven honor student. Her mom is a physician that graduated from MIT. She is the smartest student in her class. At first she is smitten with William Blake, but when she realises that he treats girls like an object, she ends up with Mike instead. Gigi loves her friends, and would do anything for them. She vows to put them first, before any boy. To show this she joins the ski team with Bea.
- Neerja Padwami: Gigi's best friend. Daughter of two doctors that have an academically gifted older sister. She has two younger sisters who are twins. She becomes prompter in the school play Romeo and Juliet. She does not want to be like her big sister Parad, who, although was one of the smartest girls of her year, was a nobody in her social life. She had a major crush on Justin until she finds that they just did not click. Justin's ex-girlfriend after she realizes that she liked Henry more than she likes Justin. She's also an overachiever.
- Beatrice (Bea) Honeycutt: An overachiever like her other two best friends. She is raised by her lawyer parents that makes her not afraid to stand up to herself or her friends and has a fiery temper. She is also quite sensitive about her red hair, and is a member of the ski club.
- Ava Wilkes: Gigi's former friend. Once a girl who obeyed rules, she is a rebellious goth artist who dates an exchange student from Germany. It is finally revealed that she changed herself for boys, so they want her. She becomes preppy and neat again after she develops a crush on Will.
- Mike Ipolito: Gigi's classmate who was accused of cheating on an exam with Gigi. He has a crush on Gigi and always asking her to give her homework for him to copy so he can talk to her. Finally he ended up with Gigi. His academic ability is on a par with Gigi, even though he never shows it, covering it with the 'dumb jock' image.
- William (Will) Blake: Gigi's love interest, until she sees through his deceptive charm. Handsome, smart, wealthy, charming he couldn't more be than a Casanova. He claims that he has fallen for Gigi, but she realizes that she is only a substitute for his girlfriend in California. Gigi gets sick of him and stops falling for his games.
- Parad Padwami: Neerja's older sister who goes to Princeton with a full scholarship. A role model for Gigi, Bea and Neerja, they finally realize that behind her seemingly perfect life she keeps a dirty little secret that she's not a popular student and is a nobody, even though she is the smartest student in her year and graduates as valedictorian. Her SAT score is 2400.
- Henry Filomen: Neerja's next door neighbor and best male friend. He eventually falls for Neerja and vice versa.
- Justin Crenshaw: Neerja's crush for most of her life. A cute guy who is in love with himself. He dumps Neerja for another girl.

== Reception ==
Critical reception for Smart Girls Get What They Want was predominantly positive, with the book gaining praise from multiple review sites and journals such as Publishers Weekly and TeenReads. Booklist overall praised the novel and stated that while the trends and fashion mentioned in the book "will become dated, the issues won’t".
