= Sarah Strohmeyer =

American novelist (born 1962)

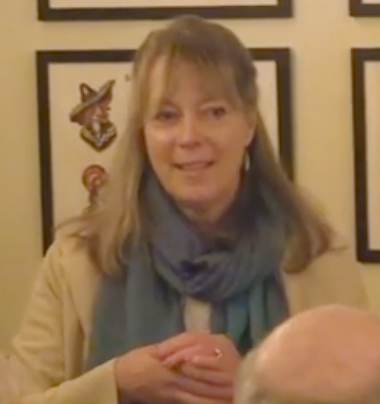
- At a community event in 2023
- Born: December 17, 1962 (age 63); Bethlehem, Pennsylvania, U.S.
- Education: Tufts University
- Occupations: Writer, novelist
- Writing career
- Period: 20th and 21st centuries
- Genres: Mystery; Chick-lit
- Notable work: Bubbles Yablonsky Series The Cinderella Pact
- Website: sarahstrohmeyer.com

Sarah Strohmeyer (born December 17, 1962) is an American author of eighteen crime novels and humorous books about relations between men and women. She is best known for her Bubbles Yablonsky series about a Pennsylvania hairdresser who is drawn into solving various crimes and murders.

== Early life and education ==
Strohmeyer grew up in Bethlehem, Pennsylvania. She attended Tufts University in Medford, Massachusetts, where she graduated with a degree in international relations.

== Career ==
After graduation, Strohmeyer began work as a journalist for Home News Tribune in New Brunswick, New Jersey, The Plain Dealer in Cleveland, and later Valley News.

In 1997, Strohmeyer published Barbie Unbound, which she wrote in response to her seeing several mothers refuse to allow their children to play with the doll due to it being perceived as being a "bimbo".

Strohmeyer's book The Cinderella Pact was reviewed by The Roanoke Times. The book was later turned into a 2010 movie, Lying to be Perfect, which aired on Lifetime.

=== Awards ===
- 2001 Agatha Award, Best First Novel for Bubbles Unbound

== Bibliography ==
=== Bubbles Yablonsky series ===
- Bubbles Unbound (2001)
- Bubbles in Trouble (2002)
- Bubbles Ablaze (2003)
- Bubbles a Broad (2004)
- Bubbles Betrothed (2005)
- Bubbles All The Way (2006)
- Bubbles Reboots (2018)

=== Stand-alone novels ===
- The Secret Lives of Fortunate Wives (2005)
- The Cinderella Pact (2006)
- The Sleeping Beauty Proposal (2007)
- Sweet Love (2008)
- The Penny Pinchers Club (2009)
- Kindred Spirits (2011)
- Smart Girls Get What They Want (2012)
- How Zoe Made Her Dreams (Mostly) Come True (2013)
- The Secrets of Lily Graves (2014)
- This Is My Brain on Boys (2016)
- Do I Know You? (2021)
- We Love to Entertain (2023)
- A Mother Always Knows (2025)

=== Non-fiction ===
- Barbie Unbound: A Parody of the Barbie Obsession (1997)

== Personal life ==
Strohmeyer has two grown children and lives in Middlesex, Vermont, with her husband. She was the former town clerk.
