= Andover USD 385 =

Public school district in Andover, Kansas

Address
- 1432 N. Andover Rd. Andover, Kansas, 67002; United States
- Coordinates: 37°42′42″N 97°8′4″W

District information
- Type: Public
- Grades: K to 12
- Schools: 10

Other information
- Website: usd385.org

Andover USD 385, also known as Andover Public Schools, is a public unified school district headquartered in Andover, Kansas, United States. The district includes the communities of Andover, Lorena, and nearby rural areas.

== History ==
On April 30, a EF3 Tornado swept through Andover causing damage to Prairie Creek Elementary.

== Schools ==
The school district operates the following schools:

High schools:

- Andover High School
- Andover Central High School

Middle School:

- Andover Middle School
- Andover Central Middle School

Elementary School:

- Cottonwood Elementary
- Meadowlark Elementary
- Prairie Creek Elementary
- Robert M. Martin Elementary
- Sunflower Elementary
- Wheatland Elementary

== See also ==
- Kansas State Department of Education
- Kansas State High School Activities Association
- List of high schools in Kansas
- List of unified school districts in Kansas
