= Andover, Kansas =

City in Butler County, Kansas

- City
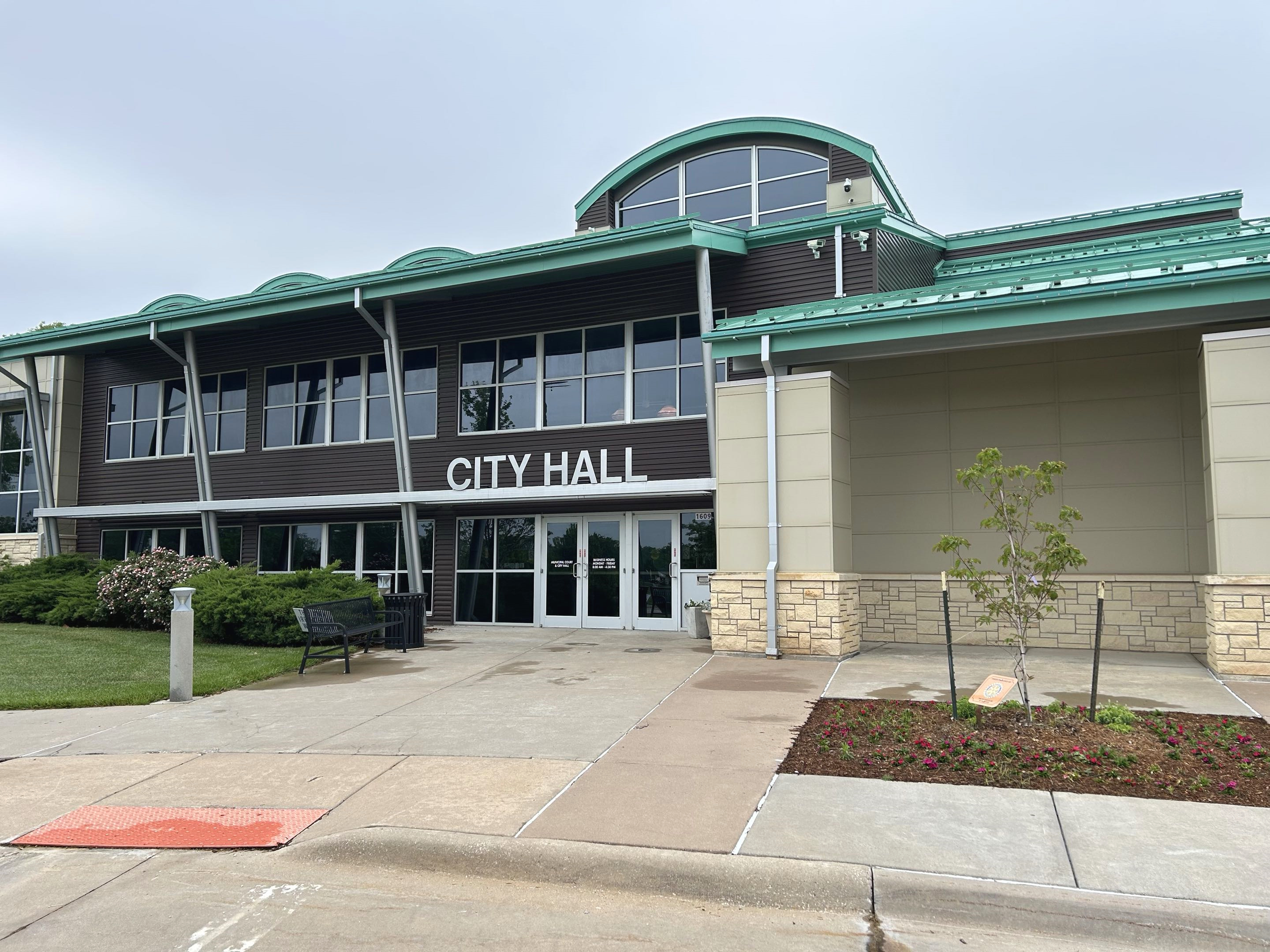
- City hall in Andover (2026)

- Location within Butler County and Kansas

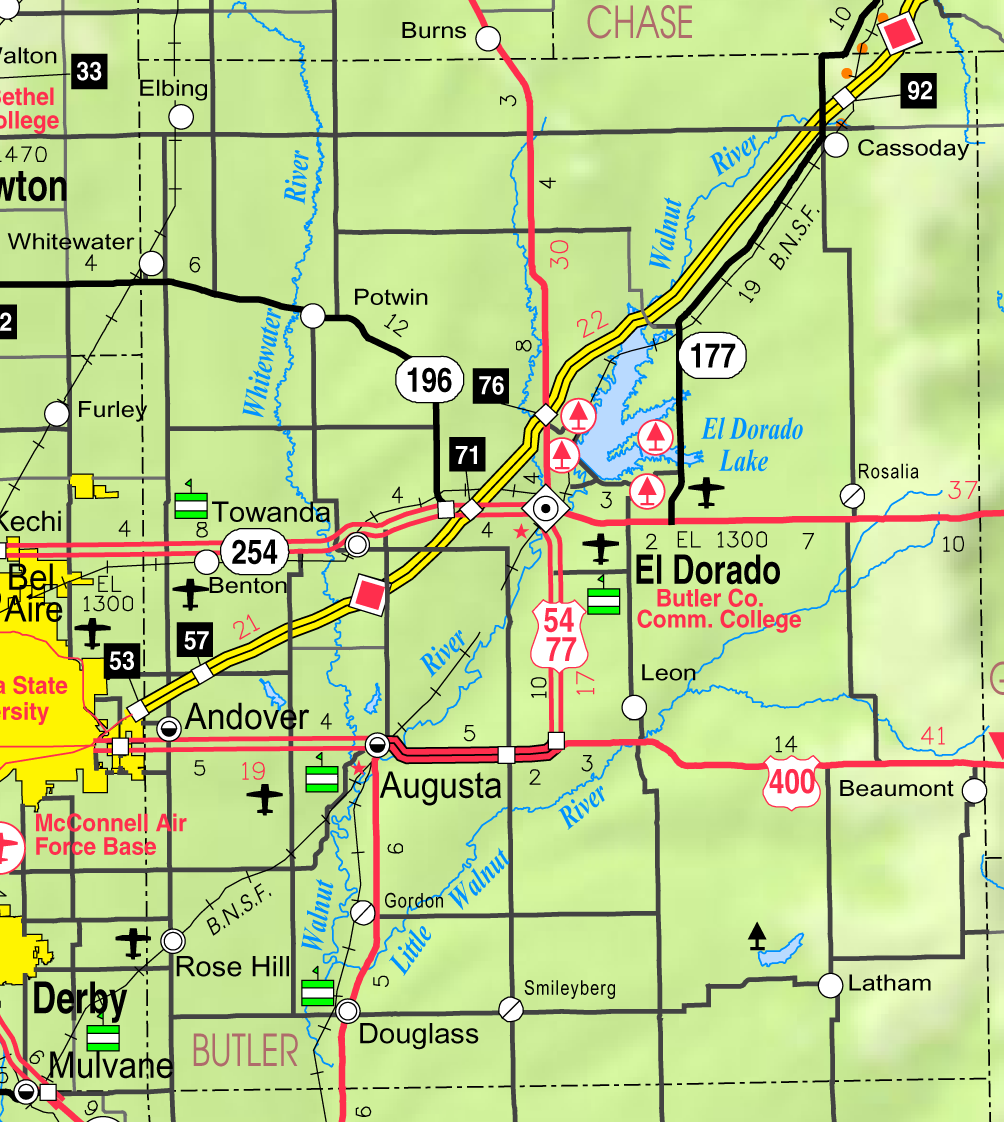
- KDOT map of Butler County (legend)
- Coordinates: 37°41′14″N 97°08′06″W
- Country: United States
- State: Kansas
- Counties: Butler, Sedgwick
- Founded: 1870s
- Incorporated: 1957
- Named for: Andover, Massachusetts

Area
  - Total: 10.15 sq mi (26.28 km^{2})
  - Land: 10.09 sq mi (26.14 km^{2})
  - Water: 0.054 sq mi (0.14 km^{2})
- Elevation: 1,332 ft (406 m)

Population (2020)
  - Total: 14,892
  - Density: 1,476/sq mi (569.7/km^{2})
- Time zone: UTC-6 (CST)
  - Summer (DST): UTC-5 (CDT)
- ZIP Code: 67002
- Area code: 316
- FIPS code: 20-01800
- GNIS ID: 2393956
- Website: www.andoverks.gov

Andover is a city in Butler County, Kansas, United States, and an eastern suburb of Wichita. As of the 2020 census, the population of the city was 14,892. Andover is the most populated city in Butler County.

== History ==
=== 19th century ===
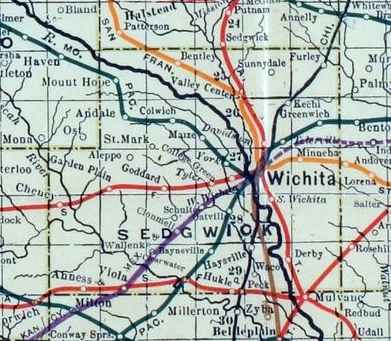
1915 railroad map of Sedgwick County

When the Kansas territory was first mapped, the original Andover area was called Minneha (Native American name). Later it was changed to Cloud City.

The first Euro-American settlement in Bruno Township was in February 1869, when Vincent Smith arrived on Dry Creek (2 miles east of Andover Road on 21st Street). He filed his claim on May 10, 1869. Other early settlers began to arrive in spring 1870, and soon all the land was claimed. The first Bruno Township election was held April 9, 1872. The first township officers were N.B. Daniels, Trustee; Jacob Brown, Treasurer; J.D. Reber, Clerk; Isaac Newland and Samuel Reed, Justices of the Peace; William Riser and Isaac Stroup, Constables. Bonds totaling $18,000 were issued for the extension of the Frisco Railway through Bruno Township. The railway was completed in 1880.

G. M. Pattison homesteaded the land that became the original plot on which Andover was built. In August 1872, Pattison was given title to this property. In February 1876, the land was sold to Mr. and Mrs. Ephraim Waggoner.

Andover's first church was what is known today as the United Methodist Church. The church started as a Sunday school in 1873.

The original post office was established at Minneha (an extinct town) in November 1877. A branch was moved to Cloud City in March 1880. That same year, the Cloud City post office was renamed Andover. Andover was named after Andover, Massachusetts.

In January 1880, Mr. and Mrs. Waggoner deeded 40 acres (160,000 m^{2}) to Charles Glancey. Mr. Glancey platted the original townsite in February 1880. The legally established townsite was known as Cloud City, named after Mr. Cloud, a railroad engineer. He helped build the St. Louis–San Francisco Railroad through town. The name of the town was changed from Cloud City to Andover on June 7, 1880, when Mr. Cloud had a "falling out" with residents of the area.

A trading post which sold all types of merchandise was the first known business in Andover. The first hotel was operated in 1881 by J. C. Lines. The front part of the hotel was a general store operated by G. W. Harris.

In 1882, the Richland schoolhouse was moved to the present Meadowlark Elementary School location at a cost of $2,000 and became the city's first school. Professor Haskin was the first principal and enrollment was 86 students.

Early businesses during the 1882–83 period were a hotel, a grocery and lumber company, a shoemaker, a business that handled livestock, coal and grain, a general store, a meat market, two other grocery stores, and the railway agent. In 1883, the population of Andover was about 150 people. The first passenger train went through Andover in 1885 and the last passenger train in October 1960.

The best known historical event was a train robbery at 10:00 P.M., on July 17, 1898. After being forced to flag the train, Depot Agent S.B. McClaren escaped and ran to the nearby Methodist Church—where an ice cream social was being held—to spread the alarm. Will Belford, 28 years old, was shot while trying to stop the bandits and died five weeks later. The robbers escaped, but were captured on August 12, 1898, in Maize, Kansas. Both were tried in Butler County Court. Sam Smith was charged with first-degree murder and hanged. Thomas Wind was charged with second-degree murder and sent back to prison.

=== 20th century ===
The class of 1914 was the first class to graduate from Andover High School. The class of four students to receive diplomas were Josie Boyer, Virgil Grier, Ola Peacock, and Perry Hiskin. The school itself started in the fall of 1909 as a consolidated school which had been formed by combining four school districts, and qualified as an accredited high school.

Andover did not incorporate into a third class city until February 4, 1957. The population of the city proper was 166. Up until this time, Andover was a small unincorporated community surrounded by farmland. Homes began to spring up south of the original townsite.

At the first city election on April 2, 1957, Hugo Epp won by one vote over Charles Clay for the position of mayor. The form of government is mayor-council, with the mayor elected every four years, and five council members at large every two years. Robert Dodge was elected Police Judge. Councilmen elected were Roy Allison, Orland Wolf, Ual Baker, Roger Moore and Clair Mohler.

A major annexation in 1968 not only increased the area of the city, but the population grew from 500 to 2,000.

The first Greater Andover Days Celebration was held in 1967.

Andover has two golf courses within a mile of each other and one in the southernmost part of the city that, in 2005–2006, was rated the 43rd best golf course in the country by Golf Digest.

==== 1991 tornado ====
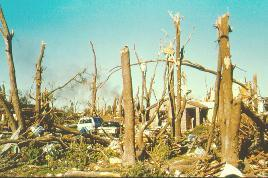
Damage from the 1991 tornado

On April 26, 1991, an F5 tornado left a trail of destruction through parts of Kansas, including south Wichita and Andover. Widening to nearly one-half mile, with winds over 260 mph (420 km/h), the deadliest blow was to Andover. The twister ripped through the town, killing 13 people. A third of the 4,300 residents were left homeless. Over 300 homes, 10 businesses and two churches were destroyed. The Golden Spur Mobile Home Park and the St. Vincent De Paul Catholic Church were leveled. It was rated F5; had the tornado hit the heart of Wichita the death toll would likely have been higher.

=== 21st century ===
In 2000, Andover passed a bond issue allowing the school system to double in size. Andover grew to two high schools, two middle schools, and 4 elementary schools. Andover High School and Andover Middle School both use the Trojans as their mascot, sporting blue and white for their colors. Andover Central High School and Andover Central Middle School are the newer of the schools, established in 2001. Their mascots are the Jaguars and school colors are black and gold. Both schools have outstanding athletic, academic, music, drama, and art programs. Both programs are also crosstown rivals of each other.

Six schools; Cottonwood, Meadowlark, Robert Martin, Wheatland, Prairie Creek, and Sunflower have been the Elementary buildings serving the community. In 2005, Andover residents approved in bond election to build three additional elementary schools. The first of which, Robert Martin Elementary, which was named after Robert M. Martin, moved from a shared building with Meadowlark into a new location in the fall of 2007. The remaining two new buildings opened in the fall of 2008 as Wheatland Elementary and Prairie Creek Elementary.

In 2005, Andover passed a sales tax increase to contribute to the building of a new Andover Public Library. The new Library was constructed at Andover's Central Park, ground breaking was in late summer 2007.

==== 2022 tornado ====
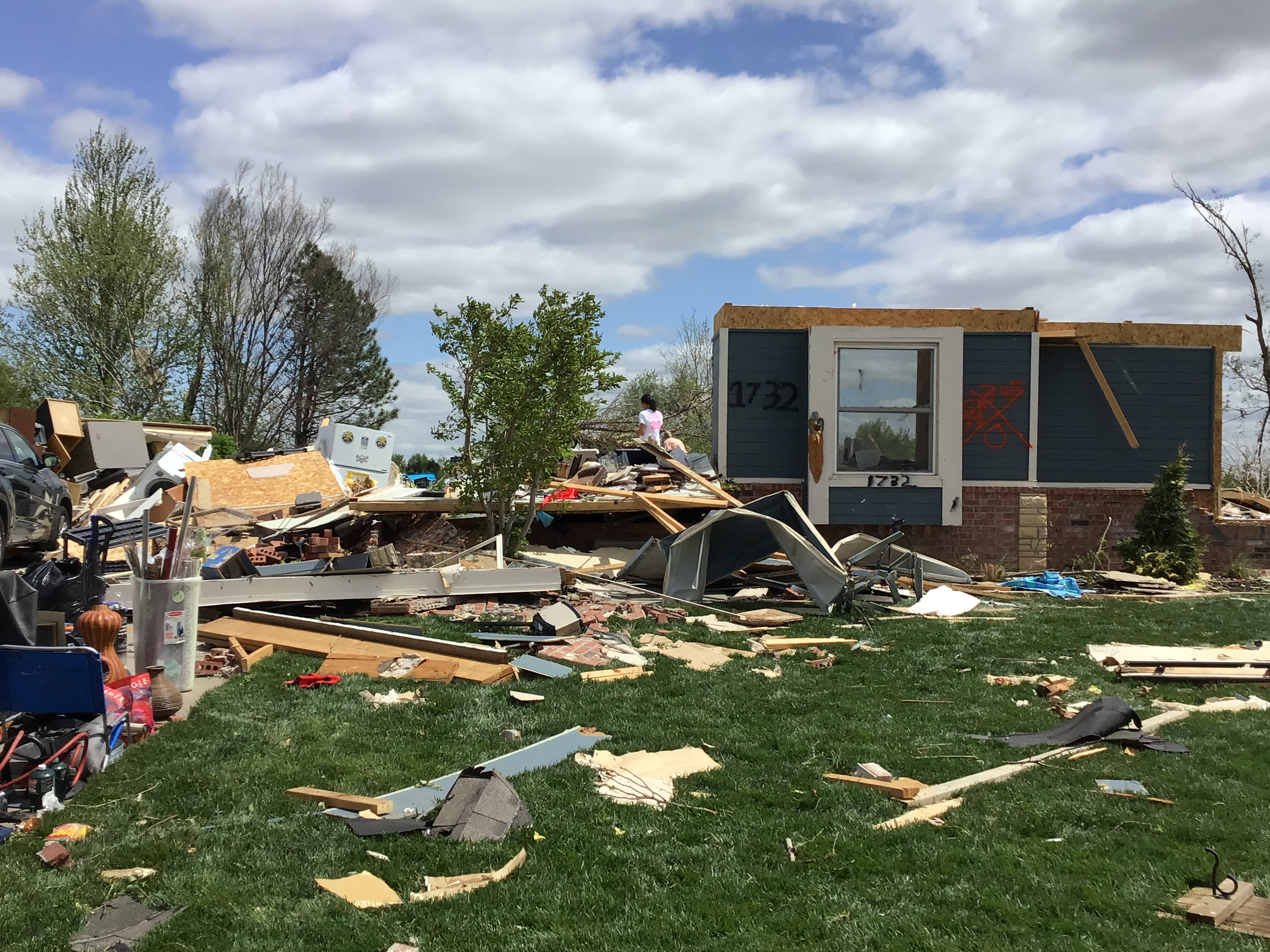
A home destroyed by the 2022 tornado

On the evening of April 29, 2022, an EF3 tornado caused major damage to a YMCA branch in Andover; the tornado also tossed cars and destroyed buildings throughout town. Three people sustained minor injuries, while three indirect injuries also occurred during the cleanup after the storm. Prairie Creek Elementary School of Andover USD 385 was damaged and would not open again until the following school year began in August 2022.

The tornado was on the ground for 21 minutes, from 8:10 p.m. until 8:31 p.m., and traveled 12.5 miles (20.1 km). It started in eastern Sedgwick County, then traveled northeast into Butler County through the eastern part of Andover, then continued northeast to about SW 60th Street. It damaged 21 residences in Sedgwick County and more than 1,000 buildings in Butler County.

== Geography ==
According to the United States Census Bureau, the city has a total area of 10.04 square miles (26.00 km^{2}), of which 9.99 square miles (25.87 km^{2}) is land and 0.05 square miles (0.13 km^{2}) is water. It is located in Butler County, Kansas, the largest county in Kansas. Butler County is larger than the state of Rhode Island.

Andover has two public parks: Andover Park and Andover Central Park.

== Demographics ==
Historical population
Census	Pop.	Note	%±
1960	186		—
1970	1,880		910.8%
1980	2,801		49.0%
1990	4,047		44.5%
2000	6,698		65.5%
2010	11,791		76.0%
2020	14,892		26.3%
2023 (est.)	15,814		6.2%
U.S. Decennial Census; 2010-2020

Andover is part of the Wichita, KS Metropolitan Statistical Area.

=== 2020 census ===
As of the 2020 census, Andover had a population of 14,892, with 5,009 households and 3,973 families. The median age was 34.8 years. 32.0% of residents were under age 18, 7.2% were from 18 to 24, 27.2% were from 25 to 44, 22.7% were from 45 to 64, and 10.9% were age 65 or older. For every 100 females, there were 98.4 males, and for every 100 females age 18 and over, there were 94.6 males age 18 and over.

There were 5,287 housing units, of which 5.3% were vacant. The homeowner vacancy rate was 1.5% and the rental vacancy rate was 7.2%. The population density was 1,430.8 inhabitants per square mile (552.4/km^{2}), and there were 508.0 housing units per square mile (196.1/km^{2}). 95.4% of residents lived in urban areas, while 4.6% lived in rural areas.

Of the 5,009 households, 47.3% had children under the age of 18 living in them. Of all households, 63.1% were married-couple households, 13.5% were households with a male householder and no spouse or partner present, and 19.3% were households with a female householder and no spouse or partner present. About 17.6% of all households were made up of individuals and 7.8% had someone living alone who was 65 years of age or older. The average household size was 3.1 and the average family size was 3.5.

Non-Hispanic White residents were 78.75% of the population.

Racial composition as of the 2020 census
Race	Number	Percent
White	12,043	80.9%
Black or African American	375	2.5%
American Indian and Alaska Native	90	0.6%
Asian	678	4.6%
Native Hawaiian and Other Pacific Islander	14	0.1%
Some other race	247	1.7%
Two or more races	1,445	9.7%
Hispanic or Latino (of any race)	1,056	7.1%

=== 2016–2020 American Community Survey estimates ===
The 2016–2020 5-year American Community Survey estimates show that 30.0% of the population had a bachelor's degree or higher. The median household income was $98,320 (with a margin of error of +/- $8,468) and the median family income was $110,694 (+/- $8,079). Males had a median income of $59,196 (+/- $6,023) versus $43,814 (+/- $6,228) for females. The median income for those above 16 years old was $50,578 (+/- $2,457). Approximately, 4.2% of families and 6.1% of the population were below the poverty line, including 5.8% of those under the age of 18 and 21.8% of those ages 65 or over.

=== 2010 census ===
As of the census of 2010, there were 11,791 people, 4,036 households, and 3,129 families living in the city. The population density was 1,180.3 inhabitants per square mile (455.7/km^{2}). There were 4,233 housing units at an average density of 423.7 per square mile (163.6/km^{2}). The racial makeup of the city was 93.0% White, 1.0% African American, 0.6% Native American, 1.8% Asian, 0.1% Pacific Islander, 0.9% from other races, and 2.5% from two or more races. Hispanic or Latino of any race were 4.8% of the population.

There were 4,036 households, of which 49.1% had children under the age of 18 living with them, 63.0% were married couples living together, 10.3% had a female householder with no husband present, 4.3% had a male householder with no wife present, and 22.5% were non-families. 19.6% of all households were made up of individuals, and 9.6% had someone living alone who was 65 years of age or older. The average household size was 2.89 and the average family size was 3.34.

The median age in the city was 33.7 years. 33.7% of residents were under the age of 18; 6.2% were between the ages of 18 and 24; 27.6% were from 25 to 44; 23.6% were from 45 to 64; and 9% were 65 years of age or older. The gender makeup of the city was 48.4% male and 51.6% female.

== Economy ==
Andover has a thriving local business community. Vornado Air is headquartered in Andover.

== Education ==
The community is served by Andover USD 385 public school district, and has two high schools (Andover High School and Andover Central High School), two middle schools, and six elementary schools.

A branch campus of Butler Community College is located in Andover.

== Transportation ==
The Frisco Railway formerly provided passenger rail service to Andover on a line between Wichita and Monett, MO until at least 1959. As of 2025, the nearest passenger rail station is located in Newton, where Amtrak's Southwest Chief stops once daily on a route from Chicago to Los Angeles.

== Notable people ==
Notable individuals who were born in or have a connection to Andover include:

- Ty Masterson (born 1969), Kansas state legislator
- Roe Messner (born 1935), building contractor
- Kevin Schmidt (born 1988), actor
