= Lorena, Kansas =

Unincorporated community in Butler County, Kansas

Coordinates: 37°41′38″N 97°05′02″W

Lorena is an unincorporated community in Butler County, Kansas, United States.

== History ==
Lorena had a post office from the 1870s until 1902.

== Education ==
The community is served by Andover USD 385 public school district.
