= Maggie Sawyer =

DC Comics character

- Maggie Sawyer in Action Comics #1000 (January 2018); Art by Dan Jurgens

Publication information
- Publisher: DC Comics
- First appearance: Superman (vol. 2) #4 (April 1987)
- Created by: John Byrne

In-story information
- Full name: Margaret Ellen Sawyer
- Species: Human
- Place of origin: Earth
- Team affiliations: Gotham City Police Department; Metropolis (Special Crimes Unit)

Maggie Sawyer is a fictional character appearing in media published by DC Comics, primarily in association with Superman. She is a member of the Metropolis police and handles crimes when Superman is unavailable.

The character appeared in the live-action series Smallville, played by Jill Teed, and in the second and third seasons of the Arrowverse series Supergirl, played by Floriana Lima. Furthermore, Joanna Cassidy voices Sawyer in the DC Animated Universe (DCAU).

== Publication history ==
Maggie Sawyer first appeared in Superman (vol. 2) #4 and was created by John Byrne.

== Fictional character biography ==
Maggie Sawyer, as she first appeared in Superman (vol. 2) #4 (April 1987). Art by John Byrne.

Maggie Sawyer was introduced in the second volume of Superman in April 1987 as the captain of the Metropolis Special Crimes Unit. She largely replaced Inspector Henderson from the previous comics as Superman's police contact.

Sawyer tries to prove the police force is more efficient than a vigilante in fighting crime, and so becomes a constant thorn in Superman's side during the early days of his career, even trying to apprehend him occasionally. Eventually, after being injured and saved by Superman during a terrorist plot, her attitude towards him warms up.

Later stories revealed that she originally came from Star City. She married fellow police officer James Sawyer, although she was uncertain about her own sexual identity, and they had a daughter named Jamie. Maggie later came out as lesbian. James divorced her and won sole custody of Jamie and he refused to let Maggie have contact with their daughter. Maggie moved to Metropolis when the SCU position became available and resumed relations with her family in later stories. Maggie has been in a long-term relationship with Toby Raynes, a reporter for the Metropolis Star.

In Action Comics #600, Lex Luthor, then a corporate executive, met with Maggie to get her to stop investigating his activities and tries to blackmail her with documentation regarding her sexuality, which would discredit her and taint her career. When Luthor injures himself and flees the room due to kryptonite poisoning, Maggie is tempted with taking the evidence left behind on his desk, but decides against it.

Maggie has a close working relationship with Dan Turpin, her second-in-command at the SCU. However, she originally had a strained professional relationship with Inspector Henderson. It was later revealed that Henderson simply disapproved that higher-ranking officers, such as Turpin, reported to her, a Captain. He resolves the situation by promoting her to Inspector when he becomes Commissioner during The Death of Superman storyline. In the aftermath, Sawyer becomes involved in a covert 'war' between Superman's allies and Project Cadmus, which stole Superman's body for their own ends.

Sawyer's close friendship with injured ex-police officer Eddie Walker is examined in flashback as Walker becomes the hero Loose Cannon.

=== Metropolis S.C.U. ===
Maggie Sawyer is the main character in the four-issue limited series comic title Metropolis SCU written by Cindy Goff, penciled by Peter Krause and inked by José Marzan Jr., which was published from November 1994 to February 1995. The series features Lois Lane joining the S.C.U. to gain a deeper understanding of their operations. Meanwhile, a rogue scientist attempts to destroy the Earth via lasers from space.

For this miniseries appearance, Sawyer received the 7th Outstanding Comic Strip GLAAD Media Awards in March 1996.

=== Batman: No Man's Land ===
In mid-2000s comics, Maggie transfers to Gotham City's police force as the head of the Major Crimes Unit, and is a significant character in the comic Gotham Central. The move has placed some strain on her relationship, since Toby did not follow her to Gotham.

Following the events of Infinite Crisis, Harvey Bullock discovers corruption in the GCPD apparently all the way up to Commissioner Michael Akins. In the end, James Gordon returns to his former position as commissioner. Maggie Sawyer, however, does not appear to be involved and is still a Captain.

=== 52 ===
Maggie appeared in the series 52.

In Week Three, she arrives to a scene to find the body of Alex Luthor. She calls in Steel to ID the body, when Lex Luthor comes in with the press and announces that Alex was the one responsible for all of Luthor's wrongdoings.

In Week Twelve, Maggie yells at Renee Montoya for busting up a cover for Intergang, closing all leads to the criminal group in Gotham City.

=== Detective Comics ===
Maggie appeared in Detective Comics #856 at a charity ball attended by Kate Kane. While the two are dancing, Maggie mentions that she and Toby are no longer together and asks Kate for her phone number.

=== Batwoman ===
Sawyer appears as a supporting character in the new Batwoman series launched in 2011 as part of The New 52 initiative. In that series she has begun dating Kate Kane, whose secret activities as Batwoman complicate their relationship. The prequel event Zero Year establishes she and Kate had first crossed paths when Maggie, as a Metropolis police officer, arrived in Gotham as backup support for an approaching hurricane; the two share a brief glance in precinct headquarters after Kate gets treatment for minor injuries she received while foiling a burglary during the storm. Kane reveals her identity as Batwoman by proposing to her in costume in Batwoman #17.

After Commissioner Jason Bard resigns, Maggie is appointed in his place. However, she ended up stepping down to return to the MCU, and has Gordon restored as Commissioner.

=== DC Rebirth ===
During the DC Rebirth event, Maggie transfers back to the Metropolis Police.

== Other versions ==
An alternate universe variant of Maggie Sawyer appears in DC Comics Bombshells.

== In other media ==
=== Television ===
- Maggie Sawyer appears in Superman: The Animated Series, voiced by Joanna Cassidy.
- Maggie Sawyer makes a cameo appearance in the Justice League episode "Hereafter", voiced by an uncredited Dana Delany.
- Maggie Sawyer appears in Smallville, portrayed by Jill Teed. This version is a lieutenant, later detective, of the Metropolis Police Department.
- An original incarnation of Maggie Sawyer named Margarita Sawyer appears in Supergirl, portrayed by Floriana Lima. This version is a member of the Science Police and former partner of Alex Danvers.

=== Film ===
Maggie Sawyer appears in The Death of Superman, voiced by Amanda Troop.

=== Video games ===
- Maggie Sawyer appears in Superman: Shadow of Apokolips, voiced again by Joanna Cassidy.
- Maggie Sawyer appears in DC Universe Online, voiced by Lorrie Singer.
- Maggie Sawyer appears as a character summon in Scribblenauts Unmasked: A DC Comics Adventure.
- Maggie Sawyer appears in Lego Dimensions, voiced by Laura Bailey.

== See also ==
- Homosexuality in the Batman franchise
- List of gay, lesbian, or bisexual figures in fiction and myth
