= Andover Central High School =

Location
- 603 East Central Avenue; Andover, Kansas 67002; United States
- 37°41′33.6″N 97°7′42.9″W

Information
- School type: Public, High School
- Established: 2001
- School board: Board Website
- School district: Andover USD 385
- CEEB code: 170089
- Principal: Chad Gerwick
- Teaching staff: 49.34 (FTE)
- Grades: 9 to 12
- Enrollment: 853 (2023–2024)
- Student to teacher ratio: 17.29
- Campus: Suburban
- Colors: Black; Gold
- Athletics conference: Ark Valley Chisholm Trail League
- Mascot: Jaguar
- Rival: Andover High School
- Website: School Website

Andover Central High School is a public secondary school in Andover, Kansas, United States, operated by Andover USD 385 school district, and serves students of grades 9 to 12. It is located southeast of Central and Andover Road. There are approximately 800 students in attendance at Andover Central High School. The school is located adjacent to Andover Central Middle School and north of Sunflower Elementary School. The head principal is Chad Gerwick.

== Extracurricular activities ==
=== Athletics ===
The Jaguars compete in the Wichita Suburban League and are classified as a 5A school, the second-largest classification in Kansas according to the Kansas State High School Activities Association, whilst some sports play in 4A classification. Throughout its history, Andover Central has won several state championships in various sports. Andover Central has been very productive since its inception in 2001. Both the boys' and girls' basketball teams have placed second in the state championship. The girls' basketball team won the 4A state championship in the 2007–08 season with a 26–0 record and won the 5A state championship in 2010. The boys' basketball team won the state championship in the 2018–2019 school year as well. The boys' golf team has won state three times, occurring in 2003, 2006, and 2009. In 2009, the boys' basketball team made it to the state tournament. The softball team has won in 2009 and 2018. In 2014, the school Scholar's Bowl team won both its 4A regional tournament and then the 4A state championship; the only ACHS Scholar's Bowl team to do so. The boys swim team won the state championship in 2021 and repeated in 2022.

=== Performing Arts ===
Andover Central participates in 4A Music Festival (Different from the Athletic Classification)

Andover Central has several instrumental music ensembles for students to participate, including: Marching Band (Fall), Symphonic Band, Concert Band, Jazz I, Jazz II, Pep Band, and Pit Orchestra. Band members are also able to participate in Solo and Ensemble Festivals at the Regional and State level. Band members routinely perform for the community at sports events, in honor bands, at community festivals and for other building events within the school district. ACHS Bands take group trips every two years (odd-number years) to large regional destinations (Chicago, St. Louis, Dallas) and ACHS Jazz Bands travel to Colorado every two years (even-number years) on a ski/performance trip. Andover Central has several choirs including Men's Chorus, Ladies Chorus, Concert Choir and New Generation (Show Choir). Choir students have many opportunities to perform in regular productions throughout the year, for the community, and are able to participate in Solo and Ensemble Festivals at the Regional and State level. ACHS Vocal students have regular opportunities to travel with the Choir. The Drama program produces one play and one musical each year. The Thespian club is very active and members attend the Kansas Thespian Conference yearly.

=== State championships ===
State Championships
Season	Sport	Number of Championships	Year
Fall	Football	1	2024
Winter	Basketball, Girls	2	2008, 2010
Winter	Basketball, Boys	1	2019
Winter	Bowling, Boys	1	2025
Winter	Swim & Dive, Boys	2	2021, 2022
Winter	Wrestling	1	2011
Spring	Golf, Boys	6	2003, 2006, 2009, 2017, 2018, 2019
Spring	Softball	2	2009, 2018
Total		16	

== See also ==
- List of high schools in Kansas
- List of unified school districts in Kansas

Other high schools in Andover USD 385 school district

- Andover High School in Andover
