= Floriana Lima =

American actress

- Born: Cincinnati, Ohio, U.S.
- Education: Ohio State University
- Occupation: Actress
- Years active: 2008–present

Floriana Lima is an American actress. She played Maggie Sawyer on The CW's Supergirl. She began playing recurring character Darcy Cooper in season 2 of the ABC drama A Million Little Things, and was promoted to the main cast for season 3.

== Early life ==
Floriana was born in Cincinnati, Ohio, the daughter of Dennis Lima and Angela Maynard. She is of Italian, Irish, English, Spanish and Portuguese descent. She graduated from Fairfield Senior High School in 1999 and went on to study communications at Ohio State University.

After college, she worked as a production assistant at NBC affiliate WCMH-TV in Columbus, Ohio. She then decided to move to Los Angeles to pursue an acting career.

== Career ==
Lima was a series regular in the internet comedy Poor Paul (2008–2009) and later became a series regular in Fox's medical drama The Mob Doctor (2012–2013). She had a recurring role in NBC's spy series Allegiance (2015), was a series regular in ABC's thriller The Family (2016) and had a recurring role in Fox's action drama Lethal Weapon from 2016 to 2018. From 2016 to 2017, Lima played Detective Maggie Sawyer in season two & three of The CW's Supergirl.

In 2018, Lima played the character of psychiatrist Krista Dumont in the second season of Netflix's The Punisher.

In 2019, Lima joined the second season of ABC's A Million Little Things as military veteran and physical therapist Darcy Cooper. She became a series regular in season 3 (2021).

Lima made one-off appearances in episodes of How I Met Your Mother (2008), Ghost Whisperer (2009), Melrose Place (2009), House (2010), In Plain Sight (2010), Franklin & Bash (2011), Psych (2014), and CSI: Crime Scene Investigation (2014).

== Filmography ==
=== Television ===
Year	Title	Role	Notes
2008	Terminator: The Sarah Connor Chronicles	Franny	Episode: "The Turk"
2008	How I Met Your Mother	Haley	Episode: "Rebound Bro"
2008	Privileged	Bartender	Pilot episode
2008	My Own Worst Enemy	Female Janus Tech	Episode: "Henry and the Terrible... Day"
2009	Ghost Whisperer	Female Co-Ed	Episode: "Body of Water"
2009	The Alyson Stoner Project	Flori	Direct-to-video project
2009	Melrose Place	Carla	Episode: "Nightingale"
2008–2009	Poor Paul	Elizabeth	Web series; main role
2010	Kings by Night	Amanda	TV film
2010	House M.D.	Gabriella	Episode: "Black Hole"
2010	In Plain Sight	Robin Cusato	Episode: "Death Becomes Her"
2010	Glory Daze	Maya	Episodes: "Hungry Like Teen Wolf" and "Why Shant This Be Love?"
2011	The Nine Lives of Chloe King	Lilah Montiero	Episode: "Girls Night Out"
2011	Franklin & Bash	Amelia	Episode: "Go Tell It on the Mountain"
2012–2013	The Mob Doctor	Nurse Rosa "Ro" Quintero	Main role
2013	Hawaii Five-0	Allison Hutchins	Episode: "Ua Nalohia"
2014	Psych	Love	Episode: "The Breakup"
2014	CSI: Crime Scene Investigation	Keri Torres	Episode: "The Twin Paradox"
2014	Cloudy with a Chance of Love	Fran	Hallmark Film
2015	Allegiance	Michelle Prado	Recurring role
2016	The Family	Bridey Cruz	Main role
2016–2018	Lethal Weapon	Miranda Riggs	Recurring role; 9 episodes
2016–2017	Supergirl	Maggie Sawyer	Main role (season 2); Recurring role (season 3); 25 episodes
2019	The Punisher	Krista Dumont	Main role (season 2); 12 episodes
2019–2021	A Million Little Things	Darcy Cooper	Recurring role (seasons 2 and 4) Main role (season 3)
2023	Quantum Leap	Simone	Episode "Secret History"
2024	Tracker	Camille Picket	Recurring role (season 2)
2024–2025	Grey's Anatomy	Nora Young	Recurring role (seasons 21-22); 10 episodes
