= Taken (miniseries) =

2002 American science-fiction TV miniseries by Steven Spielberg

- Genre: Drama; Science fiction
- Created by: Leslie Bohem
- Showrunner: Leslie Bohem
- Written by: Leslie Bohem
- Directed by: Breck Eisner; Félix Enríquez Alcalá; John Fawcett; Tobe Hooper; Jeremy Kagan; Michael Katleman; Sergio Mimica-Gezzan; Bryan Spicer; Jeff Woolnough; Thomas J. Wright
- Starring: Julie Benz; Steve Burton; Eric Close; Catherine Dent; Dakota Fanning; Jason Gray-Stanford; Joel Gretsch; John Hawkes; Tina Holmes; Michael Moriarty; Willie Garson; Ryan Hurst; Chad Morgan; Anton Yelchin; Julie Ann Emery; Desmond Harrington; Ryan Merriman; Andy Powers; Chad Donella; Matt Frewer; Emily Bergl; Heather Donahue; Adam Kaufman; James McDaniel; Michael Jeter
- Narrated by: Dakota Fanning
- Composer: Laura Karpman
- Country of origin: United States
- Original language: English
- No. of episodes: 10

Production
- Executive producers: Steven Spielberg; Leslie Bohem
- Producer: Richard Heus
- Cinematography: Jonathan Freeman; Joel Ransom
- Editors: Toni Morgan; Eric Goldfarb; Frederick E.O. Toye; David Abramson; Michael D. Ornstein
- Running time: 877 minutes
- Production company: DreamWorks Television
- Budget: $40 million

Original release
- Network: Sci-Fi Channel
- Release: December 2 – December 13, 2002

Taken, also known as Steven Spielberg Presents Taken, is an American science fiction television miniseries produced by DreamWorks Television that first aired on the Sci-Fi Channel from December 2 to December 13, 2002. Filmed in Vancouver, British Columbia, Canada, it was written by Leslie Bohem, and directed by Breck Eisner, Félix Enríquez Alcalá, John Fawcett, Tobe Hooper, Jeremy Paul Kagan, Michael Katleman, Sergio Mimica-Gezzan, Bryan Spicer, Jeff Woolnough, and Thomas J. Wright. The executive producers were Leslie Bohem and Steven Spielberg.

The show takes place from 1944 to 2002 and follows the lives of three families: the Crawfords, who seek to cover up the Roswell crash and the existence of aliens; the Keyses, who are subject to frequent experimentation by the aliens; and the Clarkes, who sheltered one of the surviving aliens from the crash. As a result of the decades-long storyline, not a single actor or character appears in every episode of the series, though the voice of Dakota Fanning (who narrates as well as stars as Allie Clarke) is in every episode. Reception was positive. The series won the Emmy Award for Outstanding Miniseries and was nominated for the Golden Globe Award for Outstanding Miniseries or TV Movie.

When the show was launched, the Sci-Fi Channel used the simultaneous establishment of the organization Coalition for Freedom of Information in its promotion campaign. Both the Sci-Fi Channel and the Coalition for Freedom of Information are clients of Washington, D.C. public relations firm PodestaMattoon, and this apparent co-mingling of clients was criticized. The Coalition for Freedom of Information is a group which seeks the release of classified governmental UFO files as well as scientific, Congressional, and media credibility for the study of this subject.

Actors starring in the series include Joel Gretsch, Steve Burton, Eric Close, Heather Donahue, Matt Frewer, Catherine Dent, Ryan Hurst, Adam Kaufman, Karen Austin, Julie Benz, Tina Holmes, Willie Garson, John Hawkes, Jason Gray-Stanford, Andy Powers, Ryan Merriman, Michael Moriarty, Michael Jeter, James McDaniel, James Kirk, and sisters Dakota & Elle Fanning.

== Synopsis ==
Taken spans five decades and four generations, and centers on three families: the Keys, the Crawfords, and the Clarkes. Nightmares of abduction by extraterrestrials during World War II haunt Russell Keys; the Roswell UFO incident transforms Owen Crawford from ambitious Air Force captain to amoral shadow government conspirator; and an alien visitor impregnates an unhappily married Sally Clarke. As the decades go by, the heirs of each are affected by the machinations of the aliens, culminating with the birth of Allie Clarke, the final product of the aliens' experimentation and the key to their future.

=== The Artifact ===
The "Artifact" is a mysterious device connected to the aliens. The Artifact was initially on one of the alien ships flying over Earth on July 2, 1947, but the ship collided with a spy balloon and crashed, and most of its crew died. The Artifact itself was thrown clear of the ship and left half-buried in the ground. It was found and retrieved by Sue, a local woman who was the estranged girlfriend of ambitious Air Force Captain Owen Crawford.

Sue, seeing the small scrap of metal had alien writing on it and hoping it would rekindle her relationship with Owen, takes it to him. Owen, who is being phased out of the investigation into the crashed alien spaceship (which itself was retrieved), brutally murders Sue. Owen then shows the Artifact to his superior, Colonel Thomas Campbell, and blackmails him into promoting him to Major and making him head of the Roswell UFO Investigation Project.

Over the next 50 years, the Artifact remains in the possession of the Crawford family, and acts as the guide to each member's efforts to understand the aliens' mission on Earth.

The Artifact's true nature is not revealed until 2002, when the head of the Project, Mary Crawford, discovers new writing is still being formed on the Artifact's surface. This reveals to the government that the Artifact is the recording device of the aliens' great genetic experiment: to create a hybrid being possessing the aliens' powers and more-evolved consciousness as well as humankind's emotional core, which will lead them to the next step in their evolution. It has been continuously recording the events of the aliens' experiments over the decades since its arrival on Earth.

When the hybrid Allie Clarke departs with the aliens, the Artifact is teleported away with them.

=== Implants ===
As part of their experiment, the aliens abducted thousands of innocent humans (exactly 46,367), mostly at night or while on airplanes, in order to find suitable breeding pairs and humans compatible with their DNA, to begin the process of creating the ultimate hybrid of human and alien. The aliens placed implants in an area of the brain that made it impossible to remove without killing or inflicting critical brain damage on the person (at least by the standards of human science). The implants also had a hand in manipulating a person's memories following their abduction, and served as tracking devices, to allow the aliens to abduct their human test subjects wherever they may be.

The implants remained undiscovered until 1962, when Russell Keys' head was x-rayed to determine the cause of his seizures. The doctors treating him initially believed it was a tumor, but his son Jesse, suspecting it might be related to the aliens, demanded he have the same x-ray, and a similar implant was discovered.

Hoping to find a way to neutralize the implants and be free of the aliens' interference, Russell and Jesse arranged a meeting with Colonel Owen Crawford. Russell, in private, offered up his implant in order to save his son from grave harm, despite knowing it would most likely lead to his death to have it removed. Owen accepted, and Russell was escorted to a secret surgery facility. Upon his arrival, Russell realized Owen had betrayed him, but he was overpowered by the guards and sedated. The project's doctor successfully removed the implant from Russell's brain. Seconds later, it was revealed that the implant exerts some form of negative psychic effect on human minds. The scientists and guards were driven insane. One guard fires his machine gun at nearby oxygen tanks, causing the entire trailer to explode, killing Russell, Dr. Kreutz, and all within.

Learning from their mistakes, the UFO Project took precautions while retrieving and analyzing more implants from other test subjects or from their corpses. Eventually, a sophisticated tracking system was created by Doctor Chet Wakeman, which was used with great effect in tracking down abductees. Essentially, the implants give off a tracking signal based on the frequency of the basic element hydrogen, which once discovered made it relatively easy for the government's UFO project to track the abductees as well.

The aliens kept using the implants as part of the experiment, ultimately using them to bring the Clarke and Keys families together to produce Allie Clarke.

After John taught Allie how to remove the implants, she used the ability on everyone that came to protect her at the farmhouse so they would not be taken anymore, and would no longer be afraid.

=== Aliens ===
The Roswell Gray aliens depicted in the series are about as large as a child, but possess incredible psychic powers. According to Dr. Wakeman, they do not even originate from our dimension or plane of reality, though while here they are subject to our physical laws (accidentally hitting a weather balloon during a storm was enough to make the Roswell saucer crash). Their "technology" is so far advanced that it is essentially an extension of their minds, capable of being reformed at will. The aliens can also create utterly realistic hallucinations in humans, and often use this to try to interact with abductees. Sometimes they get a bit confused however, and re-use mental projections for one family member on another.

The reason the aliens are abducting humans is part of their hybridization experiment. When the aliens initially crashed in Roswell, it was just a scouting mission. However one surviving alien, "John", evaded capture by the army and (after assuming a projection of human form) was given shelter by Sally Clarke until he was retrieved by another ship. As Dr. Wakeman eventually pieces together, and the alien "John" confirms, Sally's simple act of kindness awoke an echo of something long dormant in the aliens. They had evolved to be millions of years in development ahead of humans, but the evolutionary tree is a branching path, so in the process they had evolved away from some of their more "primitive" aspects, such as emotions. John's encounter with Sally made the aliens realize they had evolved away from emotion and morality, and even with this knowledge they could not simply re-attain it. Therefore, the aliens decided to hybridize themselves with humans to try to recover these qualities that they had lost. While their abductions were considered frightening and invasive by humans, John explains that the entire problem was that the aliens simply had no concept of "good" or "evil", and were incapable of making such a value judgment.

Unfortunately, long-term contact with the aliens and their extra-dimensional technology leads to various health problems in most humans. For reasons even the aliens are not quite sure of, the Keys family is genetically able to be unaffected by these problems. Sally Clarke did not possess these genetic traits, and thus her hybrid child fathered by John was unable to fully harness his alien powers. All of this culminated in Allie Clarke, the daughter of Charlie Keys and Lisa Clarke, who was capable of fully using her alien abilities.

== Production ==
The series had a reported budget of $40 million.

== Home media ==
The series was released on DVD on October 21, 2003 by DreamWorks Home Entertainment. In 2003, a soundtrack album for the series was also released by DreamWorks Records, featuring licensed songs. This was the only DreamWorks Television show that received a soundtrack album release by DreamWorks Records, which focused on rock and pop artists as well as soundtrack albums for films from DreamWorks Pictures and DreamWorks Animation. In February 2006, Viacom (now known as Paramount Skydance) acquired the rights to Taken and all other television shows and live-action movies DreamWorks produced since their inception, following their $1.6 billion purchase of DreamWorks Pictures and DreamWorks Television.

== Episodes ==
No.	Title	Directed by	Written by	Time period	Original release date
1	"Beyond the Sky"	Tobe Hooper	Leslie Bohem	August 1, 1944 – September 13, 1947	December 2, 2002
Featured characters: Julie Benz as Kate Keys, Steve Burton as Russell Keys, Eric Close as John, Catherine Dent as Sally Clarke, Kevin G. Schmidt as Tom Clarke, Conner Widdows as Jesse Keys, Dakota Fanning as Allie Clarke (voice), Jason Gray-Stanford as Howard Bowen, Joel Gretsch as Owen Crawford, John Hawkes as Marty Erickson, Tina Holmes as Anne Crawford, Michael Moriarty as Thomas Campbell
2	"Jacob and Jesse"	Breck Eisner	Leslie Bohem	November 1, 1953 – January 12, 1959	December 3, 2002
Featured characters: Julie Benz as Kate Keys, Steve Burton as Russell Keys, Catherine Dent as Sally Clarke, Dakota Fanning as Allie Clarke (voice), Willie Garson as Dr. Kreutz, Jason Gray-Stanford as Howard Bowen, Joel Gretsch as Owen Crawford, John Hawkes as Marty Erickson, Tina Holmes as Anne Crawford, Ryan Hurst as Tom Clarke, Chad Morgan as Becky Clarke, Anton Yelchin as Jacob Clarke
3	"High Hopes"	Sergio Mimica-Gezzan	Leslie Bohem	October 8 – November 1, 1962	December 4, 2002
Featured characters: Steve Burton as Russell Keys, Dakota Fanning as Allie Clarke (voice), Willie Garson as Dr. Kreutz, Jason Gray-Stanford as Howard Bowen, Joel Gretsch as Owen Crawford, John Hawkes as Marty Erickson, Tina Holmes as Anne Crawford, Ryan Hurst as Tom Clarke, Chad Morgan as Becky Clarke, Anton Yelchin as Jacob Clarke
4	"Acid Tests"	Bryan Spicer	Leslie Bohem	April 4 – May 28, 1970	December 5, 2002
Featured characters: Julie Ann Emery as Amelia Keys, Dakota Fanning as Allie Clarke (voice), Joel Gretsch as Owen Crawford, Desmond Harrington as Jesse Keys, John Hawkes as Marty Erickson, Ryan Earl Merriman as Sam Crawford, Andy Powers as Eric Crawford
5	"Maintenance"	Felix Alcala	Leslie Bohem	June 5, 1970 – November 8, 1980	December 6, 2002
Featured characters: Eric Close as John, Catherine Dent as Sally Clarke, Chad Donella as Jacob Clarke, Julie Ann Emery as Amelia Keys, Dakota Fanning as Allie Clarke (voice), Matt Frewer as Chet Wakeman, Desmond Harrington as Jesse Keys, John Hawkes as Marty Erickson, Ryan Hurst as Tom Clarke, Chad Morgan as Becky Clarke, Andy Powers as Eric Crawford
6	"Charlie and Lisa"	Thomas J. Wright	Leslie Bohem	November 8, 1980 – November 2, 1996	December 9, 2002
Featured characters: Emily Bergl as Lisa Clarke, Heather Donahue as Mary Crawford, Chad Donella as Jacob Clarke, Julie Ann Emery as Amelia Keys, Dakota Fanning as Allie Clarke (voice), Matt Frewer as Chet Wakeman, Desmond Harrington as Jesse Keys, Ryan Hurst as Tom Clarke, Adam Kaufman as Charlie Keys, James McDaniel as General Beers, Chad Morgan as Becky Clarke, Andy Powers as Eric Crawford
7	"God's Equation"	Jeremy Kagan	Leslie Bohem	Present day	December 10, 2002
Featured characters: Emily Bergl as Lisa Clarke, Heather Donahue as Mary Crawford, Dakota Fanning as Allie Clarke, Matt Frewer as Chet Wakeman, Adam Kaufman as Charlie Keys, Andy Powers as Eric Crawford
8	"Dropping the Dishes"	Jeff Woolnough	Leslie Bohem	Present day	December 11, 2002
Featured characters: Emily Bergl as Lisa Clarke, Heather Donahue as Mary Crawford, Dakota Fanning as Allie Clarke, Matt Frewer as Chet Wakeman, Adam Kaufman as Charlie Keys, Andy Powers as Eric Crawford, James McDaniel as General Beers
9	"John"	John Fawcett	Leslie Bohem	Present day	December 12, 2002
Featured characters: Emily Bergl as Lisa Clarke, Eric Close as John, Heather Donahue as Mary Crawford, Dakota Fanning as Allie Clarke, Matt Frewer as Chet Wakeman, Joel Gretsch as Owen Crawford, Adam Kaufman as Charlie Keys, James McDaniel as General Beers
10	"Taken"	Michael Katleman	Leslie Bohem	Present day	December 13, 2002
Featured characters: Emily Bergl as Lisa Clarke, Eric Close as John, Heather Donahue as Mary Crawford, Dakota Fanning as Allie Clarke, Matt Frewer as Chet Wakeman, Ryan Hurst as Tom Clarke, Michael Jeter as William "Bill" Jeffries, Adam Kaufman as Charlie Keys, James McDaniel as General Beers
