= Andover High School (Kansas) =

Location
- 1744 North Andover Road; Andover, Kansas 67002; United States; 37°43′02″N 97°07′59″W

Information
- School type: Public, High School
- Established: 1914
- School district: Andover USD 385
- Principal: Brent Reidy
- Teaching staff: 56.22 (FTE)
- Grades: 9 to 12
- Enrollment: 1,009 (2023–2024)
- Student to teacher ratio: 17.95
- Campus: Urban
- Colors: Blue; White
- Athletics conference: Ark Valley Chisholm Trail League
- Mascot: Trojan
- Rival: Andover Central High School
- Newspaper: The Bluestreak
- Website: ahs.usd385.org

Andover High School is a public secondary school in Andover, Kansas, United States, and operated by Andover USD 385 school district. There are approximately 850 students in attendance at Andover High School. The school is located at 1744 N. Andover Road. It was formerly connected to the Andover Butler Community College campus. The school mascot is the Trojan. The high school has 90 academic staff members including the principals.

== Extracurricular activities ==
=== Athletics ===
The Trojans compete in the Ark Valley Chisholm Trail League and are classified as a 5A school, the second-largest classification in Kansas according to the Kansas State High School Activities Association. Throughout its history, Andover has won 37 state championships in various sports. Several graduates have gone on to participate in collegiate athletics.

=== State championships ===
State Championships
Season	Sport	Number of Championships	Year
Fall	Cross Country, Girls	3	1991, 1993, 2001
Fall	Golf, Girls	4	2004, 2005, 2006, 2007
Fall	Football	1	1984
Fall	Soccer, Boys	1	2003
Fall	Tennis, Girls	8	2013, 2014, 2015, 2021, 2022, 2023, 2024, 2025
Fall	Volleyball	3	1973, 2001, 2004
Winter	Basketball, Boys	1	2023
Winter	Swim & Dive, Boys	4	2023, 2024, 2025, 2026
Winter	Swim & Dive, Girls	2	2022, 2025
Spring	Golf, Boys	4	1989, 2000, 2007, 2009
Spring	Tennis, Boys	2	2003, 2025
Spring	Track and Field, Boys	3	1993, 2008, 2019
Spring	Track and Field, Girls	1	1993
Total		37	

=== Activities ===
Andover High School is home to many extracurricular activities. The music program includes marching band, jazz band, orchestra, and several vocal music groups. These groups have earned recognition at numerous regional and state competitions. The high school has an active Scholars Bowl team with an active schedule and regular placements at the state championship. Science Olympiad is another successful program at the high school, regularly winning regionals and competing at the state championship. On the business side, the school has a large Future Business Leaders of America program that boasts several individual state champions and regularly attends the FBLA National Leadership Conference. The Andover High School theater program has a strong tradition of excellence, winning several Music Theater Wichita Jester Awards over the past several years. Each year, the program stages a full musical and a full play, along with student directed one-acts. They are also part of the International Thespian Society, Troupe #3540.

One of the school's most successful programs is their speech and debate team. Since its establishment in 1995, these teams have won several team state championships, 17 individual speech state championships, regularly qualify a large number of students to the National Speech and Debate Association National Championship, and won the NSDA national championship in original oratory in 2015 and were 2nd in the nation in 2016.

KSHSAA State Championships
Activity	Number of Championships	Years
Policy Debate	4	1998,1999, 2005, 2026
Speech	2	2025, 2026
Scholars Bowl	1	2000

== Notable alumni ==
- Jaylyn Agnew, assistant basketball coach for the Creighton Bluejays
- B. Clay Moore, professional comic book writer

== See also ==
- List of high schools in Kansas
- List of unified school districts in Kansas

Other high schools in Andover USD 385 school district

- Andover Central High School in Andover
