= Adam Kaufman (actor) =

American actor (born 1974)

- Born: May 11, 1974 (age 52)
- Education: Lynchburg College; Circle in the Square Theatre School; Eugene O'Neill Theater Center
- Occupation: Actor
- Years active: 1997–present
- Partner: Poppy Montgomery (2005–2011)
- Children: 1

Adam Kaufman (born May 11, 1974) is an American actor, known for his role in 2002 in the Steven Spielberg science fiction mini-series Taken as Charlie Keys, Ethan Brody in the third season of Dawson's Creek, and as Parker Abrams in the fourth season of The WB supernatural/horror drama Buffy the Vampire Slayer.

== Biography ==
Kaufman's father is Jewish, and his mother is Catholic. He studied drama at Lynchburg College, the Circle in the Square Theatre School, and at the Eugene O'Neill Theater Center's National Theater Institute.

Kaufman met Australian-American actress Poppy Montgomery in 2005 in Mexico while working on the independent psychological thriller film Between. In 2010, they worked together again in the TV movie Lying to Be Perfect. At the time, Montgomery starred as FBI agent Samantha Spade in the CBS mystery drama Without a Trace. From 2007 to 2009, Kaufman had a recurring role in the fifth, sixth and seventh seasons as Brian Donovan, Samantha's love interest. In June 2007, Montgomery announced her pregnancy with Kaufman, which was written into the sixth season. On December 23, 2007, Montgomery gave birth to their son Jackson Phillip Deveraux Montgomery Kaufman in Los Angeles. It was reported on October 10, 2011 in Life & Style that Kaufman and Montgomery broke up due to the distance between them when working.

== Filmography ==
=== Film ===
Year	Title	Role	Notes
2005	Between	James Roberts	
2005	Come Away with Me	Michael	
2006	Altered	Wyatt	
2011	Final Sale	Ben Martin	

=== Television ===
Year	Title	Role	Notes
1997	Law & Order	Douglas Burke	Episode: "Past Imperfect"
1999	Chicken Soup for the Soul	Matt	Episode: "Starlight, Star Bright"
1999	Brookfield	Jamie Harper	Unsold TV pilot
1999	Buffy the Vampire Slayer	Parker Abrams	Recurring role, 5 episodes
1999–2000	Dawson's Creek	Ethan	Recurring role, 5 episodes
2000	Law & Order: Special Victims Unit	Michael Goren	Episode: "Wrong Is Right"
2000	The Only Living Boy in New York	Gideon	TV movie
2000	Metropolis	Mathew	TV movie
2001	Dead Last	Dom	Episode: "To Serve, with Love"
2002	Taken	Charlie Keys	TV miniseries, 5 episodes
2003	CSI: Miami	Ted	Episode: "Spring Break"
2004	Veronica Mars	André	Episode: "The Girl Next Door"
2004	Beck and Call	Gray	TV short
2005	E-Ring	Jared Vogel	Episode: "Delta Does Detroit"
2006	Law & Order	Attorney Swain	Episode: "Release"
2006	Hello Sister, Goodbye Life	Joe	TV movie
2007	Mad Men	Bob Shaw	Episode: "Indian Summer"
2007	CSI: NY	Elliot Gano	Episode: "You Only Die Once"
2007–2009	Without a Trace	Brian Donovan	Recurring role, 13 episodes
2008	Monk	Brother Ted	Episode:"Mr. Monk Joins a Cult"
2009	Loving Leah	Jake Lever	TV movie
2009	Cupid	Tommy Brown	Episode: "The Tommy Brown Affair"
2009	Melrose Place	Toby	2 episodes
2010	Lying to Be Perfect	Alex Stanson Jr.	TV movie
2010	NCIS	Det. Philip McCadden	2 episodes
2011	Perfectly Prudence	Michael Merchant	TV movie
2012	Hawaii Five-0	Karl Strathern	Episode: "Kanalua"
2013	90210	Brock Paige	Episode: "Life's a Beach"
2013	The Client List	Lewis Clark	Episode: "Unanswered Prayers"
2013	The Thanksgiving House	Rick Allen	TV movie
2014	Corporate	Tucker McIntyre	TV movie
2014–2015	State of Affairs	Lucas Newsome	Series regular, 13 episodes
2015	Stalker	Will	2 episodes
2015	A Mother's Betrayal	Kevin	TV movie
2016	Secrets and Lies	R.B. Warner	Episode: "The Brother"
2017	Crazy Ex-Girlfriend	Robert Donnelly	Episode: "Can Josh Take a Leap of Faith?"
2017	Lethal Weapon	Brad	Episode: "The Murtaugh File"
2017–2018	iZombie	Harry Thorne	2 episodes
