= Kevin Schmidt =

American actor

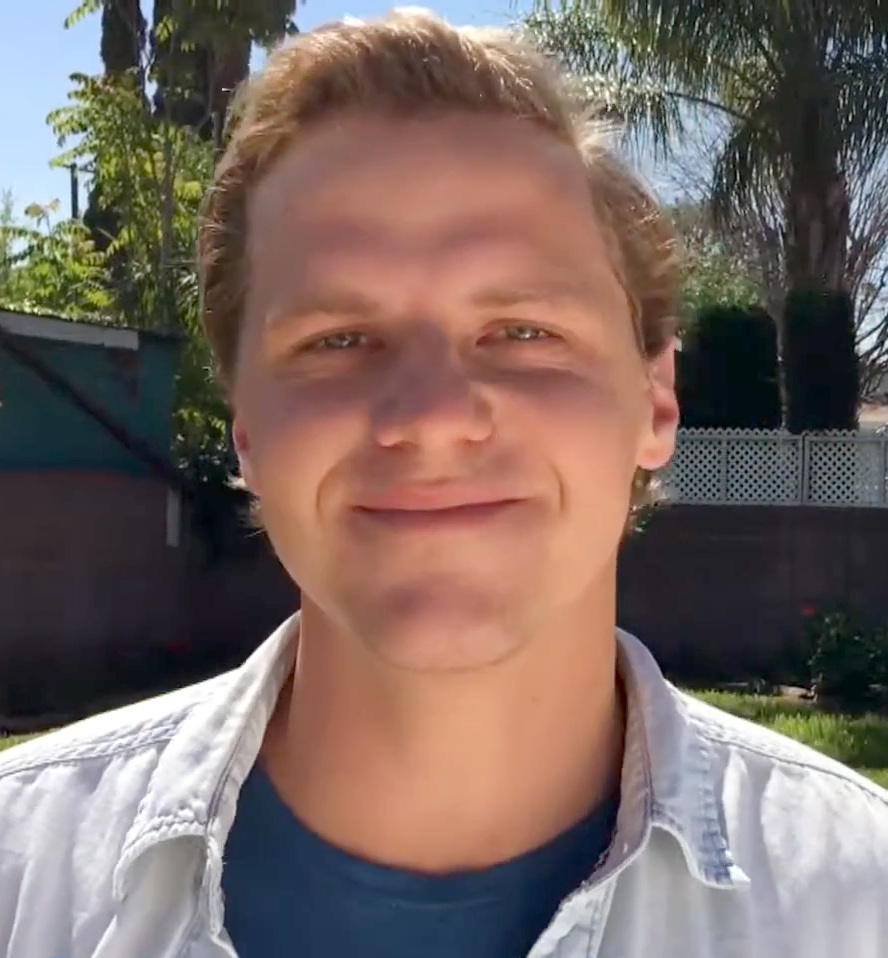
- Kevin G. Schmidt in 2016
- Born: Kevin Gerard Schmidt; August 16, 1988 (age 38); Andover, Kansas, U.S.
- Other name: Kevin G. Schmidt
- Occupations: Actor; producer; director
- Years active: 2001–present
- Relatives: Kendall Schmidt (brother)

Kevin Gerard Schmidt (born August 16, 1988) is an American actor, known best for his role as Henry Baker in Cheaper by the Dozen and Cheaper by the Dozen 2 and as Noah Newman in The Young and the Restless. Schmidt also played Ryan in Alvin and the Chipmunks: The Squeakquel and starred on Cartoon Network's first live-action scripted television series, Unnatural History. Schmidt also co-created, starred in, produced, and directed a cult web-series, Poor Paul. Schmidt continues to write, direct, and act, and also served as president of the Conscious Human Initiative, a non-profit organization that sought to reduce malnutrition worldwide.

== Life and career ==
Schmidt was born in Andover, Kansas. His brother is musician and actor Kendall Schmidt.

At first, Schmidt did not plan to work in the entertainment industry. As a football player and a student, Schmidt was uninterested in acting but was persuaded to start auditioning after his two brothers, Kenneth and Kendall, found success as actors in Los Angeles, California. Schmidt was ten years old when he began to book a string of guest-starring roles and appeared on a number of prime time television shows including NCIS, Bones, Without a Trace, CSI: NY, Curb Your Enthusiasm and Monk. Schmidt also found success on the big screen. In addition to his role in Cheaper by the Dozen and its sequel, Schmidt co-starred with Ashton Kutcher in The Butterfly Effect and Kristen Stewart in Catch That Kid. Schmidt transitioned to leading roles, starring in Resurrection Mary and Alvin and the Chipmunks: The Squeakquel.

Having undergone his own personal weight loss at age 17, Schmidt shared what he had learned about fitness and health on his screenwriting and directorial debut project entitled The Alyson Stoner Project. Teaming up with friend and Cheaper by the Dozen co-star Alyson Stoner, the pair produced an instructional musical and fitness hybrid that uses the latest dance moves as a method of exercise. The project was intended to teach children the importance of fitness, nutrition, and making good lifestyle choices.

In addition, Schmidt is in production on The Great Migration, an animated film which he wrote; he is producing the film alongside Rob Minkhoff, director of the Disney film The Lion King. The film stars his younger brother, Kendall, along with Logan Henderson, Ashley Tisdale, Vanessa Hudgens, and Ashley Benson.

Schmidt is an advocate for sustainable farming methods such as aquaponics and hopes to aid in ending malnutrition and obesity worldwide.

== Filmography ==
=== Film ===
Year	Film	Role	Notes
2001	Mind Rage	Young Michael Reid	
2003	Cheaper by the Dozen	Henry Baker	
2004	The Butterfly Effect	Lenny at 13	
2004	Catch That Kid	Skip	
2005	Cheaper by the Dozen 2	Henry Baker	
2007	Resurrection Mary	Jeff Pryce	
2008	Untitled Dave Caplan Pilot	Daniel	TV movie
2009	Alvin and the Chipmunks: The Squeakquel	Ryan Edwards	
2009	Princess Protection Program	Bull	
2016	American Wrestler: The Wizard	Rowan Knox	
2018	Randy's Canvas	Clinton	
2021	The Legend of Resurrection Mary	Jeff	

=== Television ===
Year	Title	Role	Notes
2001	Grounded for Life	Kyle	Episode: "Jimmy was Kung-Fu Fighting"
2001	The Downer Channel	Timmy	1 episode
2002	Taken	Tom Clarke - Child	Episode: "Beyond the Sky"
2002	The King of Queens	Skitch	Episode: "Shrink Wrap"
2004	Clubhouse	Brad Saminski	5 episodes
2005	Monk	Leo	Episode: "Mr. Mink and Little Monk"
2007	Numb3rs	Steven Wexford	Episode: "In Security"
2008	CSI: NY	Tyler Bennet	Episode: "Happily Never After"
2008–12	The Young and the Restless	Noah Newman	Role from: August 13, 2008 to February 8, 2010; April 14 to November 4, 2011; May 29 to August 3, 2012
2008–09	Poor Paul	Justin	Main role
2010	Unnatural History	Henry Griffin	Lead role, credited as Kevin G. Schmidt
2012	Bones	Davey Benson	Episode: "The Bod in the Pod"
2017	Love	A.D.	Episode: "The Long D"
