= Supergirl season 5 =

Supergirl
- Season 5
- Promotional poster
- Showrunners: Jessica Queller; Robert Rovner
- Starring: Melissa Benoist; Mehcad Brooks; Chyler Leigh; Katie McGrath; Jesse Rath; Nicole Maines; Azie Tesfai; Andrea Brooks; Julie Gonzalo; Staz Nair; LaMonica Garrett; David Harewood
- No. of episodes: 19

Release
- Original network: The CW
- Original release: October 6, 2019 – May 17, 2020

Season chronology
- ← Previous; Season 4 Next → Season 6

The fifth season of the American television series Supergirl, which is based on the DC Comics character Kara Zor-El / Supergirl, premiered on The CW on October 6, 2019, and consisted of 19 episodes. It is set in the Arrowverse, sharing continuity with the other television series of the franchise. The season is produced by Berlanti Productions, Warner Bros. Television, and DC Entertainment.

The season was ordered in January 2019, and was originally planned to have 22 episodes, later brought down to 20. Filming began that June, and production was shut down in March 2020 due to the COVID-19 pandemic, leaving the season with only 19 episodes.

Melissa Benoist stars as Kara, with principal cast members Mehcad Brooks, Chyler Leigh, Katie McGrath, Jesse Rath, Nicole Maines, and David Harewood also returning from previous seasons. They are joined by Azie Tesfai and Andrea Brooks, who were promoted to the main cast from recurring status in the fourth season, LaMonica Garrett, who previously appeared as a guest in the fifth annual Arrowverse crossover "Elseworlds" and the fifth season, and new additionals Julie Gonzalo and Staz Nair. Former series regulars Jeremy Jordan, Chris Wood, Odette Annable, and Sam Witwer return for the series' 100th episode.

== Episodes ==
Supergirl, season 5 episodes
No. overall	No. in season	Title	Directed by	Written by	Original release date	Prod. code	U.S. viewers (millions)
88	1	"Event Horizon"	Jesse Warn	Derek Simon & Nicki Holcomb	October 6, 2019	T13.21801	1.26
After discovering Kara Danvers' secret identity from her brother Lex Luthor before she killed him, Lena fights Kara in a virtual simulation and has built an A.I. named Hope to talk to as she no longer trusts anyone. Meanwhile, Andrea Rojas acquires CatCo, replacing James Olsen as editor-in-chief, and employs tabloid journalism to increase subscription numbers. Alex Danvers convinces Kara to tell Lena that she is Supergirl, so she tells her at a party celebrating her Pulitzer Prize. Suddenly, the party is attacked by Midnight, a Phantom Zone prisoner that J'onn J'onzz defeated years prior. Kara reconciles with and reveals her identity to Lena before using a new suit Brainy created for her to stop a black hole Midnight opened and send her back to the Phantom Zone. While Kara shows more openness to Lena about her secret, Lena re-enters the simulation to vent; pledging to use Kara's trust to "fix mankind". James quits CatCo, refusing to support Andrea's sensationalist plans. Elsewhere, J'onn's brother, Malefic, vows to get revenge himself following Midnight's failure despite J'onn not remembering having a brother while Eve Teschmacher returns to National City on Leviathan's orders, but gets black-bagged.
89	2	"Stranger Beside Me"	David McWhirter	Dana Horgan & Katie Rose Rogers	October 13, 2019	T13.21802	0.97
With Kelly Olsen's help, J'onn learns that his memories of the Martian Civil War were altered, but that Malefic was his brother who betrayed the Green Martians to aid the White Martians. J'onn and Malefic receive immense pain whenever they attack one another due to a curse, which J'onn still suffers from, so he asks Kelly to soothe his pain using Q-waves, but Malefic secretly sees this and realizes Q-waves can help further his revenge against his brother. Meanwhile, Lena reveals to Eve her plan to use Andrea's technology to improve humanity by giving them Hope's altruism and loyalty before having Hope take over Eve's body. Elsewhere, Kara chafes at her new work assignments, and rival reporter William Dey seems to be on the trail of her secret identity.
90	3	"Blurred Lines"	Eric Dean Seaton	Lindsay Sturman & J. Holtham	October 20, 2019	T13.21803	0.92
J'onn requests Nia Nal's help in delving deeper into his past, finding that he used his telepathy to erase Malefic from his father's memory since the latter blamed himself for Malefic's isolation due to his unstable power. Malefic attacks Kelly, who he tricked into revitalizing his suppressed mind control powers, but escapes after a confrontation with J'onn. Kelly is revealed to have developed a psychic link with Malefic when she returned his powers and identify him in a shapeshifted form. Meanwhile, Kara, Alex, and James track down an alien with the ability to shoot cobwebs. They find the culprit in former special ops commander Caroline O'Connor, who is possessed by the spider-like Aurafacian symbiotes. Alex uses a device to remove the Aurafacians from Caroline's body. However, she is later mysteriously killed by an unknown person before she can be taken into D.E.O. custody. Lena asks Kara to steal Lex's childhood journal and discovers his research on mind control. Nia confronts Brainy about their relationship.
91	4	"In Plain Sight"	David McWhirter	Jay Faerber & Jess Kardos	October 27, 2019	T13.21804	0.95
With Nia's help, Kara discovers that William is an undercover reporter who suspects that Andrea is a criminal. She prevents a new supervillain called Breathtaker from assassinating Elena Torres and has her remanded to the DEO. Meanwhile, James and Kelly return to their hometown, which they find corrupted by the presence of a new prison, where people receive unjustly long prison sentences for minor crimes. They meet a teenager named Simon, who James helps in his mother's case. Elsewhere, Malefic takes control of Alex, but she is saved by Kara and J'onn and seemingly send him to the Phantom Zone. Brainy and Nia reconcile their relationship and James leaves National City to take over his hometown newspaper. Unbeknownst to Kara and her allies, Malefic was teleported into Lena's office instead, where Lena forges an alliance with him. This marks Mehcad Brooks' final episode as a series regular with the departure of James Olsen from National City.
92	5	"Dangerous Liaisons"	Alysse Leite-Rogers	Rob Wright & Daniel Beaty	November 3, 2019	T13.21805	0.78
Lena promises to help Malefic overcome his inhibition to kill J'onn in exchange for experimenting on him to duplicate his mental inception power. However, she reneges and uses the power to keep him in captivity. Kara and William pursue leads involving an assassin called Rip Roar, who William believes killed his friend, Russell Rogers, and is working for the Rojas family. Rip Roar steals a laser weapon from an Army base and uses it to cause a devastating flood, though Supergirl, J'onn, and Dreamer are able to prevent mass casualties and capture the assassin. It is later revealed that Rip Roar is Rogers, knows Andrea, and is under the control of Leviathan instead. Meanwhile, Andrea successfully launches her new VR product, where Dey confronts a simulation of Andrea that he made. Andrea is visited by an elderly representative of Leviathan, Margot, who informs her about what happened to Rip Roar.
93	6	"Confidence Women"	Shannon Kohli	Dana Horgan & Nicki Holcomb	November 10, 2019	T13.21806	0.84
Flashbacks show how Andrea and Lena met, and how their friendship became strained. While searching for the acrata medallion, Andrea has her first encounter with Leviathan, who put her up to killing Governor Harper and Caroline O'Connor by telling her how the medallion works. To further their goals, Leviathan brainwashes Rogers into becoming Rip Roar to act on their behalf. In the present, Andrea is assigned to eliminate the captured Rogers, but her first attempt to break into the D.E.O. fails. After going to Lena for help, Andrea sets up a fake break-in for Supergirl to investigate while she raids the D.E.O. headquarters once again with psychic tech as the masked Acrata; making off with Rip Roar even in spite of Supergirl's intervention. During the raid, Supergirl discovers the assassin's connection to Leviathan. Andrea gives Lena the medallion and attempts to run away with Rogers, but a Leviathan operative kills him before another of their representatives meets with her. Though she says she does not have the medallion anymore, she is told that it merely activated her powers, which actually came from the darkness within her. Elsewhere, Alex and Lena independently continue to learn more about Leviathan.
94	7	"Tremors"	Andi Armaganian	J. Holtham & Katie Rose Rogers	November 17, 2019	T13.21807	0.79
Margot fails to get the medallion back from Lena, forcing Leviathan to take action. Meanwhile, J'onn begins to have visions of Malefic. When he asks his father's spirit for help, he suggests J'onn should attempt to bond with his brother, no matter the outcome. The bond is successful, and Malefic forgives J'onn. Back at the D.E.O., Brainy discovers Leviathan's location and travels there with Alex while Lena and Kara search for a weapon in the Fortress of Solitude to defeat the organization. Suddenly, they are attacked by Rama Khan, a centuries old alien and agent of Leviathan who can manipulate the Earth. While fighting him, Kara manages to suppress Khan's powers, forcing him to retreat. Afterwards, Lena admits to Kara she killed Lex, knew her secret before she told her, and rants about how she broke her trust and deserves to feel her pain. Lena ignores Kara's attempts to reason with her and leaves her trapped in kryptonite gas.
95	8	"The Wrath of Rama Khan"	Marcus Stokes	Lindsay Sturman & Jess Kardos	December 1, 2019	T13.21808	0.87
Alex and Brainy save Kara from the Fortress' trap. Alex tells Kara that Lena is beyond redemption, but Kara disagrees. Meanwhile, Andrea joins Kara and J'onn in fighting Khan while Lena prepares to mind-control all of Earth with Q-waves. In response, the D.E.O. has Malefic use his own Q-waves to repel them. Kara subdues Khan before Andrea seals him in a tar pit before they attack Leviathan's hideout. After breaking up the fight, Andrea flees just as Leviathan operative Gamemnae relieves Khan of his duties. When Lena and Hope are discovered, the latter takes the fall as Eve and is arrested. Later, Malefic decides to return to Mars, and the Monitor reveals to J'onn that he brought Malefic to Earth to test him for the impending crisis, which he passed by reconciling with his brother. Unbeknownst to anyone, the Monitor has resurrected Lex and is also preparing him for the crisis; fulfilling the latter's desire to become a hero in exchange for helping him with a favor involving Lena.
96	9	"Crisis on Infinite Earths: Part One"	Jesse Warn	Story by : Robert Rovner & Marc Guggenheim; Teleplay by : Derek Simon & Jay Faerber	December 8, 2019	T13.21809	1.67
As the Crisis begins, Brainy detects an anti-matter wave approaching Argo City, so Kara warns her mother Alura Zor-El, her cousin Clark Kent, and his wife Lois Lane. The Kents narrowly send their son Jonathan off-world just as the wave hits Argo. Meanwhile, on Earth-1, Harbinger brings Barry Allen, Kate Kane, Oliver Queen, Mia Smoak, Sara Lance, and Ray Palmer to Earth-38 and rescues the Kents. As Harbinger briefs the heroes on the Anti-Monitor, the Monitor raises a quantum tower to impede the anti-matter wave while the DEO and Lena work to evacuate Earth-38. After learning Jonathan ended up on Earth-16, Lois, Sara, and Brainy leave to get him. In preparation, Oliver passes the mantle of Green Arrow to Mia but, when he learns Barry is fated to die, he argues with the Monitor over the deal they made last year. (Note: As depicted in "Elseworlds".) The heroes fend off an army of shadow demons until the Monitor breaches them off-world. However, Oliver stays behind, sacrificing himself to ensure the exodus succeeds. On Earth-1, Lois' team returns with Jonathan before the Monitor brings a dying Oliver to share his good-byes. Nash Wells, now a "pariah" for releasing the Anti-Monitor, appears, announcing everything is doomed. Note: This episode begins a crossover event that continues on Batwoman season 1 episode 9, The Flash season 6 episode 9, and Arrow season 8 episode 8, and concludes on Legends of Tomorrow's special episode.
97	10	"The Bottle Episode"	Tawnia McKiernan	Story by : Derek Simon; Teleplay by : Nicki Holcomb & Jen Troy	January 19, 2020	T13.21810	0.84
Following the Crisis and her Earth being merged with Earth-1, (Note: As depicted in "Crisis on Infinite Earths".) Kara adjusts to her new life on Earth-Prime when she discovers she is working for Lex, who is now the owner of the D.E.O. and Leviathan is no longer a public threat while J'onn restores their allies' pre-Crisis memories. Four alternate Brainiac-5s, who had survived the Crisis, suddenly appear on Earth-Prime. They are unsure of how it happened, though they know they are being targeted by the Anti-Life Equation. Nia discovers that one of them plans to bring back his Earth, which he trapped inside a bottle. However, she, Kara, and Brainy defeats the desperate Brainiac-5, who makes peace with the team and decides to live in the bottled Earth until Kara and her team can find a way to bring it back. Before the other Brainiacs merge with Brainy to form the "Big Brain", the female Brainiac-5 informs him that in order to defeat Leviathan, he must secretly ally himself with Lex and sacrifice his friends and relationship with Nia to do so. Elsewhere, William voices his suspicions about Lex to Kara while Gamemnae visits Andrea under the alias of board member Gemma Cooper.
98	11	"Back from the Future – Part One"	David Harewood	Dana Horgan & Katie Rose Rogers	January 26, 2020	T13.21811	0.81
With Brainy's help, Lex breaks out a doppelganger of Winn Schott to attack a toy convention under the alias of Toyman. Just then, Winn returns from the future to stop his doppelgänger from changing his future. Kara, Alex, Winn, Nia and Brainy seek out J'onn, who has built a new base of operations called "the Tower" instead of going to the D.E.O. so he can get Winn up to speed on what happened before the Crisis. At the Tower, Nia attempts to use her powers to find Winn's doppelgänger, but instead sees Brainy turn into a white tiger. The team learn from a livestream that Winn's doppelganger plans to attack Andrea for ruining his father's reputation using robotic white tigers. Armed with this information, Kara, Winn, Nia and Brainy manage to stop him, but he gets caught in an explosion and seemingly killed. After saving Winn's future, Brainy tells him about his alliance with Lex. Unbeknownst to everyone, the alternate Winn's consciousness suddenly appears in the D.E.O.'s computers.
99	12	"Back from the Future – Part Two"	Alexis Ostrander	Rob Wright & J. Holtham	February 16, 2020	T13.21812	0.65
The D.E.O. discover the alternate Toyman used the Obsidian Lenses to upload his consciousness into their computers moments before his death so he can weaponize the Internet. Alex places the D.E.O. on lockdown while Winn and Supergirl head to the server room. When they get there, they learn Winn's father, the original Toyman's, consciousness was also activated as he wants to help defeat his son's evil counterpart. When Winn confronts his doppelgänger's A.I., he reluctantly allows his father to buy him time. He enters the codes and foils his counterpart's plans as both Toymen's consciousnesses are deleted. Winn returns to the future to become a heroic Toyman in his father's memory. Due to what she learned from Brainy, Alex resigns as the D.E.O.'s director, so Lex swears in Brainy while procuring a copy of the data he wanted in order to get them closer to Leviathan. Meanwhile, Lex tracks down Gemma to discuss a collaboration with Obsidian Tech to improve the Obsidian Platform. Won over, Gemma advises Andrea to take the offer. She later has Margot inform the Anointed One that LuthorCorp is in their clutches as planned. While in their loft, Kara and Alex are visited by Mxyzptlk.
100	13	"It's a Super Life"	Jesse Warn	Story by : Robert Rovner & Jessica Queller; Teleplay by : Derek Simon & Nicki Holcomb	February 23, 2020	T13.21813	0.66
Mxyzptlk offers to help Kara by traveling back in time so she can tell Lena her identity before Lex can and ensure their friendship turns out differently. After several failed attempts, Kara decides to tell Lena after the latter moved to National City. However, Ben Lockwood blackmails Kara into globally revealing her identity by kidnapping Lena before killing Kara's friends and family. Then, Mxyzptlk shows Kara a reality where she and Lena did not meet, but his powers stop working. Nia saves them from danger and brings them to meet Alex, J'onn, Winn, Kelly, and Mon-El. Kara learns that Lena killed Lex before harnessing the 5th Dimension's energy for her Hope-Bots and getting Reign and a reprogrammed Brainy on her side. While her allies fight them off, Supergirl confronts Lena and Mxyzptlk looks for the Hat's namesake. Once he gets it, he undoes the reality. As nothing else worked, Kara decides to confront Lena as Mxyzptlk takes his leave; leaving a video about the day Lena and Lex started working together. Kara tells Lena that she can still help her, but will be forced to take action against her if she continues to help Lex.
101	14	"The Bodyguard"	Gregory Smith	Story by : Lindsay Sturman; Teleplay by : Emilio Ortega Aldrich & Chandler Smidt	March 8, 2020	T13.21814	0.67
Brainy informs Lex that Leviathan's members are from the same system as Krypton and that they need to find their version of Kryptonite. Supergirl thwarts an attempt on Andrea's life, so Lex assigns her to bodyguard duty so the Obsidian Platform's launch will go smoothly while pitching this idea to Gemma as a means of keeping her people out of the way. J'onn is informed of the energy that Supergirl saw during the attack and recognizes them as a Chlorophyllian's. Lena tests her program on Stryker's Island inmates, taking note when they develop vengeful feelings. Alex and J'onn find evidence that takes them to an abandoned farm where a Chlorophylloid named Todd resides. After being rescued by Supergirl, they find Todd dead and his wife Amy out for revenge on Obsidian Corp after they fired Todd for his virtual reality addiction. As Alex and J'onn rescue the workers, Supergirl successfully talks Amy down. With the danger averted, Andrea retrieves the Acrata medallion from her office. Lex visits Gemma to work out a deal, wherein he will get them something in exchange for meeting her people.
102	15	"Reality Bytes"	Armen V. Kevorkian	Dana Horgan & Jay Faerber	March 15, 2020	T13.21815	0.68
Nia's roommate Yvette is assaulted by a man named Gregory Bauer, a vicious transphobe who catfishes and assaults transgender women to try and force Dreamer into retirement. Using her civilian identity as bait, Nia nearly kills him as Dreamer until Kara talks her down, reminding Nia of her importance to people. Meanwhile, Alex and J'onn take on a case to rescue a man trapped in virtual reality.
103	16	"Alex in Wonderland"	Tawnia McKiernan	Story by : Rob Wright; Teleplay by : Jess Kardos & Mariko Tamaki	March 22, 2020	T13.21816	0.65
Jeremiah Danvers has been found, but recently died. Alex lashes out at everyone, weary of mourning for him again. In her despair, she uses the VR Lenses to enter a fantasy where she is Supergirl. However, consumers in the virtual reality are slowly losing their grip on actual reality and believing it to be real as they develop red eyes in the real world. Alex starts to succumb to this, but is unable to use the fail safe to exit the VR world. Kelly is able to get Alex out. After learning of this danger, Andrea talks to one of her employees, a restored Eve.
104	17	"Deus Lex Machina"	Melissa Benoist	Story by : Lindsay Sturman; Teleplay by : Katie Rose Rogers & Brooke Pohl	May 3, 2020	T13.21817	0.61
Retaining his pre-Crisis memories, Lex takes note of the changes that were made while he continues his hunt for Leviathan. As part of his plans, he convinces his Leviathan double agent, Eve, to manipulate Amy Sapphire and Richard Bates as well as kill Jeremiah. After seeing Lena show sympathy to Kara, Lex tricks the former into believing Supergirl is using Myriad. As Lena leaves the Fortress of Solitude, a Morae follows her and releases a Sun-Eater. Malefic's computers detect it, prompting M'gann to return and confront it. With help from J'onn and M'gann, Supergirl shrinks the Sun-Eater. Unbeknownst to them, Lex locates the VR victims' bodies. As Kara and J'onn meet with William, they learn Lex rescued everyone and eliminated Margot. Gamemnae confronts Lex, but he persuades her to focus Leviathan's wrath on Supergirl. Following a discussion with his mother, Lex uses Lena's transportation watch to enter the Fortress of Solitude.
105	18	"The Missing Link"	Avi Youabian	Dana Horgan & J. Holtham	May 10, 2020	T13.21818	0.62
Supergirl fights against Rama Khan and Leviathan. Lex and Lena are forced to work together when Lena's project fails to work and they get stuck inside a prison riot. Lex helps Leviathan against Supergirl. Alex and Kara meet with Pete Andrews, a man Malefic impersonated, to learn more about Leviathan. Rama Khan lets himself get captured so he can destroy the DEO's headquarters. Lena realizes she is becoming like Lex while beginning to question her own path, causing the latter to explode on her before Lena leaves. She comes to Kara's apartment to apologize for her actions. William follows Eve into an alley and is black-bagged.
106	19	"Immortal Kombat"	David Harewood	Story by : Derek Simon; Teleplay by : Emilio Ortego Aldrich & Nicki Holcomb	May 17, 2020	T13.21819	0.65
Lena tells Kara what she knows about Lex's plans, and they agree to work together to defeat him and Leviathan. Dreamer has visions of Brainy while fighting Leviathan, which she later realizes were about his secret plans. Brainy, without Lex's involvement, formulates a plan to stop Leviathan by shrinking them into a container. While the team distracts Leviathan, Brainy secretly infiltrates their headquarters. Upon learning that Leviathan plans to use the Unity Festival, Supergirl enters it to persuade its connected users to disconnect from virtual reality. Brainy puts his plan in motion when J'onn draws Leviathan's agents away. Supergirl ends the Unity Festival while Rama Khan and two Leviathan members are contained, but a weakened Brainy is unable to stop Lex from taking the container, which he and Lillian plan to use. After working together once again, Kara and Lena start to reconcile. Gamemnae, enraged, sheds her human guise.

== Cast and characters ==
=== Main ===
- Melissa Benoist as Kara Danvers / Kara Zor-El / Supergirl
- Mehcad Brooks as James Olsen / Guardian (Note: Brooks is only credited for his respective episode appearances.)
- Chyler Leigh as Alex Danvers
- Katie McGrath as Lena Luthor
- Jesse Rath as Querl "Brainy" Dox / Brainiac 5
- Nicole Maines as Nia Nal / Dreamer
- Azie Tesfai as Kelly Olsen
- Andrea Brooks as Eve Teschmacher / Hope
- Julie Gonzalo as Andrea Rojas / Acrata
- Staz Nair as William Dey
- LaMonica Garrett as Mar Novu / Monitor (Note: Garrett is only credited for his respective episode appearances.)
- David Harewood as J'onn J'onzz / Martian Manhunter and Hank Henshaw

=== Recurring ===
- Jon Cryer as Lex Luthor
- Phil LaMarr as Malefic J'onzz
- Nick Sagar as Russell Rogers / Rip Roar
- Patti Allan as Margot Morrison
- Cara Buono as Gamemnae / Gemma Cooper
- Mitch Pileggi as Rama Khan
- Brenda Strong as Lillian Luthor

=== Guest ===
- Jennifer Cheon Garcia as Midnight
- Kate Micucci as a museum tour guide
- Kari Wahlgren as the voice of Hope
- Sean Astin as Pete Andrews
- Rahul Kohli as Jack Spheer
- Carl Lumbly as M'yrnn J'onzz
- Meaghan Rath as Female Brainiac 5
- Keith Dallas as Al Crane
- Anjali Jay as Selena (bottled Earth version)
- Rosemary Hochschild as Vita (bottled Earth version)
- Winsome Brown as Ayala (bottled Earth version)
- Jeremy Jordan as Winslow "Winn" Schott Jr. and Winslow "Winn" Schott Jr. / Toyman (alternate Earth version)
- Henry Czerny as Winslow Schott Sr. / Toyman
- Thomas Lennon as Mister Mxyzptlk
- Chris Wood as Mon-El
- Sam Witwer as Ben Lockwood / Agent Liberty
- Odette Annable as Samantha Arias / Reign
- Betty Buckley as Patricia Arias
- Chad Lowe as Thomas Coville
- Willie Garson as Steve Lomelli
- Donna Benedicto as Agent Reiff
- Camille Sullivan as Amy Sapphire
- Pierson Fodé as Gregory Bauer
- Jesse Moss as Richard Bates
- Anna Van Hooft as Jennifer Bates
- Corbin Bleu as Trevor Crane
- Anne Hollister as Bonnie Walker / Tilly
- John Murphy as Derek
- Steph Song as VR Supergirl
- Sharon Leal as M'gann M'orzz
- Lynda Boyd as Eve Teschmacher's mother
- Michelle Christa Smith as Sela
- Helen Slater as Eliza Danvers

==== "Crisis on Infinite Earths" ====
- Stephen Amell as Oliver Queen / Green Arrow and Oliver Queen / Green Arrow (Earth-16)
- Caity Lotz as Sara Lance / White Canary
- Brandon Routh as Ray Palmer / Atom
- Tom Cavanagh as Nash Wells / Pariah
- Katherine McNamara as Mia Smoak / Green Arrow
- Tyler Hoechlin as Clark Kent / Superman
- Elizabeth Tulloch as Lois Lane
- Ruby Rose as Kate Kane / Batwoman
- Grant Gustin as Barry Allen / Flash
- Erica Durance as Alura Zor-El
- Audrey Marie Anderson as Lyla Michaels / Harbinger
- Burt Ward as Dick Grayson (Earth-66)
- Robert Wuhl as Alexander Knox (Earth-89)
- Griffin Newman as Trivia Host
- Wil Wheaton as a doomsday protester
- Alan Ritchson as Hank Hall / Hawk (Earth-9) (Note: These actors were not credited for their appearance.)
- Curran Walters as Jason Todd / Robin (Earth-9)
- Russell Tovey as Ray Terrill / Ray

== Production ==
=== Development ===
On January 31, 2019, The CW renewed Supergirl for a fifth season. Jessica Queller and Robert Rovner serve as the season's showrunners.

=== Writing ===
Queller described the fifth season of Supergirl as the series' "Black Mirror season", with Rovner elaborating that "What we're looking at is how technology is impacting the way people engage and giving them an escape not to engage. It seems like nowadays, everyone is kind of on their phones or not really present, and so we wanted to speak to that and kind of how it might be hard to live in the ugliness of what's going on, and how a character like Kara can try and help us overcome that." Melissa Benoist, who stars as Kara Danvers / Supergirl, said the season would be "a fight for [Lena Luthor's] soul", following Lex Luthor exposing to Lena that Kara, her best friend, is Supergirl. Rovner said the rift between Kara and Lena was something the writers had been building towards for a number of years, with the fifth season serving as the "long-awaited payoff". Queller described "betrayal" as Lena's Achilles heel due to every member of the Luthor family having betrayed her in some way over the years: "She has to put on this protective shell, and the last person she thought would betray her was Kara, and that really hurts more deeply than any of the others".

=== Casting ===
Main cast members Melissa Benoist, Mehcad Brooks, Chyler Leigh, Katie McGrath, Jesse Rath, Nicole Maines and David Harewood return as Kara Danvers / Supergirl, James Olsen, Alex Danvers, Lena Luthor, Querl Dox / Brainiac 5, Nia Nal / Dreamer, and J'onn J'onzz respectively. This is Brooks' final season; his last appearance was in the episode "In Plain Sight". Azie Tesfai, who was introduced as Kelly Olsen in the fourth season, was promoted to the main cast for the fifth season, as was Andrea Brooks, who recurred as Eve Teschmacher since the second season. They are joined by new cast members Julie Gonzalo playing Andrea Rojas and Staz Nair playing William Dey, an original creation for the series. Jeremy Jordan, who starred as Winn Schott in the first three seasons and was absent during the fourth, returned as a guest star for three episodes. The female Brainiac 5 was played by Meaghan Rath, the real-life sister of Brainiac 5 portrayer Jesse Rath, at his suggestion.

=== Design ===
The season introduces a new Supergirl suit which eschews the skirt seen in the older suit in favour of a full pant. Benoist and the showrunners said giving Supergirl pants was something they discussed since the first season. Brainy is credited with creating a new microscopic motion-activator for the new suit that attaches to Kara's glasses, activating her suit's appearance when she removes them.

=== Filming ===
Filming began in late June 2019 at Vancouver. The seventeenth episode of the season marks Benoist's directorial debut. Filming was expected to last until April 14, 2020. On March 12, 2020, Warner Bros. Television shut down production on the series due to the COVID-19 pandemic, with the series in the middle of shooting episode 20. Leigh stated she had two more days of filming on the episode. As a result, some of the material shot for episode 20 was incorporated into episode 19, rather than saving it for season six. Some new dialogue was also recorded by actors in their homes for episode 19.

=== Arrowverse tie-ins ===
In December 2018, during the end of the annual crossover "Elseworlds", a follow-up crossover was announced titled "Crisis on Infinite Earths" based on the comic book series of the same name. The crossover took place over five episodes–three (including the Supergirl episode) in December 2019 and two in January 2020.

== Broadcast ==
The season began airing in the United States on The CW on October 6, 2019. It was originally set to run for 22 episodes, later brought down to 20. As production on episode 20 could not be completed due to the COVID-19 pandemic, the 19th episode served as the season finale.

== Reception ==
=== Ratings ===
Viewership and ratings per episode of Supergirl season 5
No.	Title	Air date	Rating/share (18–49)	Viewers (millions)	DVR (18–49)	DVR viewers (millions)	Total (18–49)	Total viewers (millions)
1	"Event Horizon"	October 6, 2019	0.4/2	1.26	0.2	0.92	0.6	2.19
2	"Stranger Beside Me"	October 13, 2019	0.3/1	0.97	0.3	0.84	0.6	1.81
3	"Blurred Lines"	October 20, 2019	0.2/1	0.92	0.3	0.78	0.5	1.70
4	"In Plain Sight"	October 27, 2019	0.2/1	0.95	0.3	0.83	0.5	1.78
5	"Dangerous Liaisons"	November 3, 2019	0.2/1	0.78	0.3	0.80	0.5	1.59
6	"Confidence Women"	November 10, 2019	0.2/1	0.84	0.2	0.74	0.4	1.58
7	"Tremors"	November 17, 2019	0.2/1	0.79	0.3	0.75	0.5	1.54
8	"The Wrath of Rama Khan"	December 1, 2019	0.2/1	0.87	0.3	0.77	0.5	1.64
9	"Crisis on Infinite Earths: Part One"	December 8, 2019	0.7/3	1.67	0.4	1.00	1.1	2.67
10	"The Bottle Episode"	January 19, 2020	0.2/1	0.84	0.3	0.78	0.5	1.62
11	"Back from the Future – Part One"	January 26, 2020	0.2/1	0.81	0.2	0.66	0.4	1.47
12	"Back from the Future – Part Two"	February 16, 2020	0.2	0.65	0.2	0.65	0.4	1.31
13	"It's a Super Life"	February 23, 2020	0.2	0.66	0.3	0.76	0.5	1.42
14	"The Bodyguard"	March 8, 2020	0.2	0.67	0.2	0.66	0.4	1.33
15	"Reality Bytes"	March 15, 2020	0.2	0.68	0.2	0.66	0.4	1.34
16	"Alex in Wonderland"	March 22, 2020	0.2	0.65	0.2	0.64	0.4	1.29
17	"Deus Lex Machina"	May 3, 2020	0.1	0.61	0.2	0.62	0.3	1.23
18	"The Missing Link"	May 10, 2020	0.1	0.62	0.2	0.64	0.3	1.26
19	"Immortal Kombat"	May 17, 2020	0.2	0.65	0.2	0.58	0.4	1.23

=== Critical response ===
On review aggregator Rotten Tomatoes, the season holds an approval rating of 92% based on 111 reviews, with an average rating of 7.62/10.
