= Supergirl season 6 =

Supergirl
- Season 6
- Original poster
- Showrunners: Jessica Queller; Robert Rovner
- Starring: Melissa Benoist; Chyler Leigh; Katie McGrath; Jesse Rath; Nicole Maines; Azie Tesfai; Julie Gonzalo; Staz Nair; David Harewood; Peta Sergeant
- No. of episodes: 20

Release
- Original network: The CW
- Original release: March 30 – November 9, 2021

Season chronology
- ← Previous; Season 5

The sixth and final season of the American television series Supergirl, which is based on the DC Comics character Kara Zor-El / Supergirl, premiered on The CW on March 30, 2021, and consisted of 20 episodes. It is set in the Arrowverse, sharing continuity with the other television series of the universe. The season is produced by Berlanti Productions, Warner Bros. Television and DC Entertainment, with Jessica Queller and Robert Rovner serving as showrunners.

The season was ordered in January 2020, with filming beginning that October. Melissa Benoist stars as Kara, with principal cast members Chyler Leigh, Katie McGrath, Jesse Rath, Nicole Maines, Azie Tesfai, Julie Gonzalo, Staz Nair and David Harewood also returning from previous seasons. They are joined by new cast member Peta Sergeant. Former series regulars Andrea Brooks, Mehcad Brooks, Calista Flockhart, Jeremy Jordan, and Chris Wood all return for guest appearances, with the latter four returning in the series finale.

== Episodes ==
Supergirl, season 6 episodes
No. overall	No. in season	Title	Directed by	Written by	Original release date	Prod. code	U.S. viewers (millions)
107	1	"Rebirth"	Jesse Warn	Story by : Robert Rovner & Jessica Queller; Teleplay by : Jay Faerber & Jess Kardos	March 30, 2021	T13.22601	0.73
Lex Luthor brainwashes half of the planet into loving him using the Obsidian Lens and gains the combined powers of the bottled Leviathan members, intending on doing what the Anti-Monitor couldn't do: destroy all life on Earth and beyond, save only for his brainwashed followers. With the help of her team, Kara Danvers destroys Gamemnae by uploading the Anti-Life Equation into the nearest console. In order to take down Lex's satellites, Kara falsely offers herself up to Lex at the Fortress of Solitude. Lex defeats Kara's friends and sends Kara to the Phantom Zone before being depowered and arrested. Meanwhile, J'onn J'onzz and M'gann M'orzz destroy the satellites. Afterward, Lillian Luthor visits Lex at the National City Prison, but Lena Luthor uses Myriad to wipe their memory of Supergirl's identity. As Acrata, Andrea Rojas secretly buys her father's shares in Obsidian in order to restore her company. J'onn and M'gann begin searching for people to aid them in rescuing Kara, including Jonn's brother Malefic, but to no avail.
108	2	"A Few Good Women"	Jesse Warn	Derek Simon & Elle Lipson	April 6, 2021	T13.22602	0.69
In the Phantom Zone, Supergirl meets her father, Zor-El, who survived Krypton's destruction by sending himself into the Phantom Zone and saves her from the Phantoms. Meanwhile, Alex Danvers struggle to cope with her sister's disappearance, and is consoled by J'onn. Kara's friends find a benign vampire-like Transilvanian named Silas who once broke into the Phantom Zone, and they agree to work with him. However, due to the Crisis, the Zone fractured into an archipelago and they cannot locate Supergirl as easily. With Silas's help, Kara's friends open a portal to the Phantom Zone, but they are unable to travel through and several Phantoms escape. Meanwhile, Lex's trial ends in an acquittal after he discredits Eve and Lena as witnesses, portraying them as bitter women. Nia Nal and William Dey resolve to expose Lex's crimes through their journalism. Silas later contacts J'onn stating that one of the Phantoms evaded capture.
109	3	"Phantom Menaces"	Sudz Sutherland	Dana Horgan & Emilio Ortega Aldrich	April 13, 2021	T13.22603	0.59
A Phantom escapee attacks Silas and attempts to overtake him, and M'gann is injured while fighting it. In the Phantom Zone, Zor-El is kidnapped by Kryptonian criminals and is sent to be sacrificed to the Phantoms. Kara is injured, though she is rescued by a depowered fifth-dimensional being named Nyxlygsptlnz, a princess who knows Mxyzptlk and was sent to the Zone by her father. Meanwhile, Lena locks Lex out of LutherCorp's systems and donates all of his funds to a children's hospital. In retaliation, Lex has Otis Graves destroy it and puts the blame on a project that Lena oversaw. Kelly Olsen helps Alex cope with her sister's disappearance, and Lena talks Brainiac 5 down from a plan to murder Lex. Lena later quits LuthorCorp. Kara finds that her wounds won't heal normally in the Phantom Zone, but Nyxly heals her after Kara helps her regain her magic. They rescue Zor-El, who reveals that Alura Zor-El built the Phantom Zone, and focus on making an escape plan using Nyxly's magic.
110	4	"Lost Souls"	Alysse Leite-Rogers	Karen E. Maser & Nicki Holcomb	April 20, 2021	T13.22604	0.59
Lena creates a weapon against the Phantoms and a way to track Kara in the Phantom Zone using Kara's DNA, but Alex later forces her to re-calibrate the device to find the Phantoms' lair as it's the only way to rescue the stolen souls. Nia has visions of Kara and Alex in Midvale High, and helps Brainy process his emotions. In the Phantom Zone, Kara, Nyxly, and Zor-El search for a mirror that can transport them home, but Zor-El is attacked. Nyxly attempts to convince Kara to leave Zor-El behind, claiming that he has been hindering her progress like her own father. Kara refuses and Nyxly reveals that she was the attacker, plans to take revenge on her father, and plots mischief on Earth. While fighting, Kara starts a self-destruct sequence and smashes the mirror to block Nyxly's escape. Sentinel, Brainy, Dreamer, and J'onn release the collected souls, restoring Silas and the transformed Phantoms. In order to get more of Kara's DNA, the team must go back in time to when Kara was in high school.
111	5	"Prom Night!"	Alexandra La Roche	Rob Wright & Jess Kardos	April 27, 2021	T13.22605	0.50
In 2009 Midvale, with Alex away at college, Kara has been do-gooding with the help of Kenny Li (who is alive on Earth-Prime). Cat Grant tracks evidence of super-feats in Midvale for a Daily Planet story. Kara, Alex, and Kenny find Brainy and Dreamer immediately. At the same time, the poacher Professor Naxim Tork and his henchman Mitch arrive in a Bismolian ship to capture superpowered aliens for his menagerie. He plans to attract Kryptonians to a staged disaster. Kara and Dreamer use their powers to prevent the disaster, which Cat partially witnesses. She enlists a child with a small drone to investigate further. Kara resolves to break off with Kenny but then learns he has built her a "Fortress of Solitude." Brainy identifies Tork, but learns that their new activities have prevented him from being captured three days later in Uruguay by the DEO. Brainy and Dreamer track Tork down, but he captures them in a forcefield.
112	6	"Prom Again!"	Chyler Leigh	Rob Wright & Jess Kardos	May 4, 2021	T13.22606	0.62
Kara eliminates the forcefield, and all three defeat the poachers. Brainy locks them in their ship and sets to fly them to Uruguay, but Cat observes this with her drone, finds the cloaked ship, and accidentally releases the poachers. Their interference causes Kara to be severely poisoned when she stops the meteor. When the poachers demand Kara, Kenny instead surrenders, who is taken on the ship along with Cat. Brainy, Dreamer, and Kara rescue Kenny and Cat, but also release Plutonian Land Sharks. Tork and Mitch flee, the ship becomes visible, and Kara is captured. Brainy and Dreamer travel back in time again to the first fight with the poachers, and Kara stows away on their ship. Dreamer destroys the drone, interprets her dream, and convinces Cat to quit the Planet and begin her media empire. Kara and Brainy defeat Tork and Mitch, sending them again to Uruguay. When the meteor arrives, Kara is only slightly injured and Brainy recovers her blood sample. Kara tells Kenny she will leave town for college, and invites Kenny to come with her, but he chooses to find his own destiny.
113	7	"Fear Knot"	David Harewood	J. Holtham & Elle Lipson	May 11, 2021	T13.22607	0.47
While escaping with Zor-El, Kara experiences a Fear Vision of her friends' deaths. Brainy and Nia return with Kara's DNA, J'onn transforms the Tower into a spaceship, and they head for the Phantom Zone while M'gann stays behind to defend National City. Kelly teaches everyone how to overcome Fear Visions, leading J'onn and Alex to argue over who is more suited to retrieve Kara. A Phantom breaches containment, causing everybody to experience Fear Visions. Alex sees herself getting infected by a Phantom and sacrificing herself to draw the Phantoms away. Lena sees a Kelpie, a mythical creature that drowns everyone onboard. Kelly sees her friends infected and doubting her strength. Nia sees Brainy being sucked out of the ship after failing to interpret her dreams. J'onn and Brainy are unaffected due to their alien natures, and are able to force the Phantom back into containment, ending the Fear Visions. Kara and Zor-El are rescued and return to Earth while Nyxly secretly stows away with them on top of the Tower.
114	8	"Welcome Back, Kara"	Armen V. Kevorkian	Dana Horgan & Jay Faerber	August 24, 2021	T13.22608	0.56
The team celebrates Kara's return, but Kara suffers repeated flashbacks from her traumatic experience. Zor-El joins Kara and Nia at CatCo, posing as Kara's uncle Archie. Kara visits William, who is now seeing someone else. As CatCo's ratings plummet, Andrea overworks Kara and William and snoops for information as Acrata in attempts to trash Lex and reclaim CatCo's spot, but later realizes that there's nothing she can do and apologizes. Zor-El joins Supergirl in putting out a fire from a fallen satellite at a large collection of garbage in the ocean. The garbage prompts Zor-El to combat Earth's environmental crises out of guilt for failing Krypton, so he uses a Kelex named Oscar. It is programmed to convert garbage into energy, but it malfunctions and becomes a giant trash robot. Brainy and Zor-El create a virus to destroy it. Afterwards, Zor-El leaves to reunite with Alura on Argo City, Kara talks to Alex about her time in the Phantom Zone, and Lena calls Nia saying that she interpreted her Fear Vision of the Kelpie and leaves to visit her birthplace. In the middle of the night, Nia awakens, saying Nyxly's name.
115	9	"Dream Weaver"	Shannon Kohli	Karen E. Maser & Emilio Ortega Aldrich	August 31, 2021	T13.22609	0.59
In a dream, Nia unsuccessfully tries to reach her late mother. Nyxly gets trapped in the dream and offers to bring Nia's mother to life for one day in exchange for her freedom, promising to return to the Fifth Dimension afterward. Kara, J'onn and Alex track explosives while Andrea continues urging Kara and William to get human interest stories about the Superfriends. Kelly is assigned to help an alien superpowered boy named Joey. His brother Orlando is in prison, and Kelly and Kara soon learn that his work release plan has been corrupted to use him and other superpowered aliens to steal parts for a dirty bomb. William and Kara identify the warden as the plotter, in league with Intergang boss Bruno Mannheim. Supergirl convinces Orlando and the other aliens to surrender. Andrea is pleased with William's live interview with Supergirl, defending the now-reformed work release program and Kelly covertly exposes the abusive nature of Joey's foster home. With Alex and James Olsen's support, Kelly plans to take on the role of Guardian.
116	10	"Still I Rise"	Jesse Warn	Story by : Jess Kardos; Teleplay by : Nicki Holcomb & Jen Troy	September 7, 2021	T13.22610	0.48
Nyxly puts Nia into isolation for the day, where her mother chastises her for releasing Nyxly, but helps her understand and overcome her fear. Nyxly, left powerless, is captured by Naxim Tork's former partner Mitch, but he releases her and plans to impress Tork by capturing Supergirl. Mitch first finds an Edifarian engineering expert, Dr. Desmond Raab, to build a cryo-bomb capable of freezing everything within a mile and uses it on the Ormfell Building, a housing project to which Orlando would be able to bring Joey. J'onn stabilizes the building and Supergirl destroys the bomb with her heat vision, but this inadvertently recharges Nyxly's powers. Supergirl tries to persuade the city to not let Councilwoman Rankin turn the Ormfell Building into a tech complex, and succeeds by letting Orlando tell his story to the city council. As the Superfriends rescue citizens, Nyxly freezes Supergirl and begins destroying the building. As Nyxly gloats that Supergirl is powerless against magic, Supergirl summons Mxyzptlk.
117	11	"Mxy in the Middle"	Glen Winter	Story by : Rob Wright; Teleplay by : Elle Lipson & Chandler Smidt	September 14, 2021	T13.22611	0.40
Mxy and Supergirl escape to the Tower, where Mxy musically explains that Nyxly plans to gain unlimited power by assembling seven magical stones, which she'll use to exact revenge against her father, King Brpxz. Nyxly intends to imprison Mxy in a crystal, and she will find him immediately if he uses any magic. She terrorizes the city with a giant cat and a deadly Hell Dragon. Mxy surrenders to Nyxly, who enlists Mitch's help. Meanwhile, Lena arrives in Newfoundland and visits the hometown of her mother, Elizabeth Walsh, guided by a photo of her friends Margaret Bishop and Florence Abbott. Elizabeth is remembered as an evil witch and is blamed for the death of Margaret and her abusive husband by their daughter Peggy. With Andrea's help, Lena finds Abbott, who reveals that their coven accidentally killed Bishop's abusive husband. Florence tells Lena that she also has magical abilities.
118	12	"Blind Spots"	David Ramsey	J. Holtham & Azie Tesfai	September 21, 2021	T13.22612	0.48
Earlier, Kelly sees the destruction of the Ormfell building and helps Orlando pull Joey out of the rubble. The overwhelmed hospital workers pay little attention to them, even though they are glowing strangely. Councilwoman Rankin, also glowing, intimidates a doctor into giving her an experimental treatment, allowing her to recover immediately and gain the ability to materialize objects. As the Superfriends are preoccupied with finding Nyxly, Kelly and John Diggle work to identify Rankin's strange abilities. Kelly fights Rankin as Guardian and grabs a piece of her hair, allowing Brainy to learn how to stop her. He also improves the Guardian suit and tells Kelly that even the 31st century has inequality and oppression. Guardian uses Brainy's device to return Rankin's stolen 5th dimensional energy and she is arrested. Meanwhile, Lena begins studying magic in Newfoundland but rushes back to help her friends and finds a magic book from Florence.
119	13	"The Gauntlet"	Tawnia McKiernan	Story by : Dana Horgan; Teleplay by : Jay Faerber & Brooke Pohl	September 28, 2021	T13.22613	0.40
At the Fortress, Kara and Lena learn about the Totem of Courage from Vita, a simulation of an eccentric Kryptonian witch. When someone activates it with a magic word, they must revisit a time when they lacked courage, gaining its power when they succeed in this trial. Supergirl disrupts Nyxly's theft of the totem in the form of a slingshot that David used to slay Goliath and blasts it with her heat vision before Nyxly can escape, leaving Supergirl and Nyxly with half each. This event enhances the courage of everyone at the scene: a shy scientist is emboldened to harness lightning, Sentinel becomes reckless, J'onn is distracted by being able to express his feelings, and Brainy dares to make inaccurate predictions. Attempting the trial, Kara revisits her emergence as Supergirl, but fails, and Nyxly revisits her defeat by her father, finally succeeding by expressing her anger at her brother's betrayal. Kara's half of the totem tries to rejoin the other. Kara has Lena release it because she can only stop a catastrophic lightning storm with her team restored to their normal personalities. This works, but Nyxly now has the totem and looks for more. Vita suggests to Lena that a previously unknown Earth witch might be able to help.
120	14	"Magical Thinking"	Simon Burnett	Karen E. Maser & Derek Simon	October 5, 2021	T13.22614	0.42
William asks to be embedded with the Superfriends, agreeing to keep some operational details secret. Nyxly finds and takes the Totem of Humanity (a Bodhi charm) and activates it, causing everyone in range to join a brawling mob. Lena first fails to use her mother's spell, but William helps her with a cooking analogy. The spell works, but makes the area of violence larger. Supergirl convinces her do this again, knowing through her psychic bond that Nyxly is overwhelmed by feelings of compassion. Unable to kill a guard to obtain the Totem of Hope, Nyxly abandons the Totem of Humanity, ending the violence. Supergirl recovers it, but Nyxly starts off after the others while planning to reclaim the Totem of Humanity at a later date. Meanwhile, Kelly checks on the new foster parents of Esme, the girl from Joey's former group home. They seem nice. When they are trapped by the mob, they discover that Esme can breathe fire when faced with an Infernian attacker. They put Esme outside to protect themselves from the mob, before Guardian and Sentinel rescue her. They decide to become Esme's own foster parents and learn about her kind's true powers.
121	15	"Hope for Tomorrow"	Tawnia McKiernan	Story by : Robert Rovner; Teleplay by : Emilio Ortega Aldrich & Nicki Holcomb	October 12, 2021	T13.22615	0.38
Esme's new life with Kelly and Alex is soon complicated by her Dryalian ability to acquire superpowers from anyone nearby. They let her experience their friends' powers, but overdo it to the point where she says she should go back. With the help of a Truth Seeker, they reassure Esme that they will never abandon her. Nyxly identifies the Totem of Hope, and find that in order to use it they must "inspire hope brighter than the sun". Thinking this a job for Supergirl, Nyxly plans to extort both the Hope and Humanity tokens by taking William hostage. Nyxly's activation of the totem exacerbates a dispute between Kaznia and another nation, leading to nuclear war. Supergirl disarms both nations, passing her test by inspiring hope, and with William's help rescues him and gets all three stones. She sends the Hope totem into the sun, so that Nyxly can never unite all seven totems. Nyxly receives a gift from a "secret admirer" which contains a special watch that forms a Lexosuit around her.
122	16	"Nightmare in National City"	Eric Dean Seaton	Rob Wright & Jess Kardos	October 19, 2021	T13.22616	0.42
Following the advice of her suit's A.I., Nyxly heads into a laboratory so that she can access the Dream Realm and claim the Dream Totem. A Nightmare Monster is released, forcing the Super Friends to quarantine it in a forcefield dome with people trapped inside. Nia follows her dream vision to a university and the office of Dr. M. Revée, who is actually her sister Maeve. They work together to get into the Dream Realm, but Maeve tries to steal the Dream Totem and the oracle deems her unworthy. Nyxly steals it. Meanwhile, Kara resolves to end tensions between Kaznia and Corto Maltese, but misses interviews with a Kaznian negotiator and the nation leaders due to hostility in the dome and the monster. She hands the interviews to William and quits, and publicly apologizes as Supergirl. Though Nia considers Maeve's acts unforgivable, she does give her a second chance. Elsewhere, Nyxly places the Dream Totem in the gauntlet, causing Lex to appear.
123	17	"I Believe in a Thing Called Love"	Jesse Warn	Dana Horgan & Nicki Holcomb	October 26, 2021	T13.22617	0.45
Lex reveals to Nyxly that he travelled to the future, where they fell in love but that she died after achieving her revenge. The Superfriends bait Nyxly using a fake Love Totem and Lex rescues her. Nyxly rebuffs him, so he captures Mitch and uses him in a plan to attract her. J'onn unlocks the Courage Totem, revisiting the time he failed to protect his daughters. Nyxly finds the Love Totem, but it disappears during a fight with the Superfriends and asks for Lex's help. It reappears when Alex and Kelly propose to one another, but is destroyed in another fight against Lex and Nyxly. With Lena's help, Kara uses the Humanity Totem against Nyxly, but Lex rescues her and retreats. Afterwards, the Superfriends celebrate Alex's and Kelly's engagement and Brainy contacts the Legion of Superheroes. Meanwhile, Andrea plots to expose Lex's partnership and as Acrata, steals a journal from Lex. William secretly meets with Otis Graves. Lex gives Nyxly a recreated Hope Totem as a new Love Totem appears as a tattoo on Esme's neck.
124	18	"Truth or Consequences"	David McWhirter	Story by : Karen E. Maser; Teleplay by : Emilio Ortega Aldrich & Elle Lipson	November 2, 2021	T13.22618	0.40
The Superfriends locate Mitch's ship in cislunar space. J'onn and Supergirl defeat Nyxly and Lex, who activate the ship's self-destruct and flee through a portal (saving Mitch at the last minute). Andrea leaks Lex's love for Nyxly while using William's name. Supergirl obtains the new Hope Totem at the last minute. All seems well, and Kelly and Alex host their bachelorette party, leaving William to mind Esme at the Tower. There Brainy reveals his message from the 31st century, that he can only save the Coluan people by returning there and end his individual existence. Nyxly locates the Love Totem, Lex disarms the Tower's defenses, and they take Esme, with Lex shooting William dead on his way out. Before dying, William recorded the final moments and mailed it to Andrea which leaves her devastated. The rest of the Superfriends find William dead.
125	19	"The Last Gauntlet"	Glen Winter	Story by : J. Holtham; Teleplay by : Derek Simon & Jay Faerber	November 9, 2021	T13.22619	0.59
Lex offers to exchange Esme for the other totems. The Love Totem tattoo begins losing its petals, but Nyxly refuses to harm Esme despite Lex's warning that this is how she fails. Lillian attempts to break up Lex and Nyxly. Lena catches Acrata in the Tower, but reminds her that she can change for the better. Kara finds the Destiny Totem in Prague and sees Lex and Nyxly all-powerful, but Alex takes it and the other totems. Lex extracts the Love Totem, but this angers Nyxly and she takes the totem and returns Esme. Brainy and J'onn hijack a satellite to refocus the Sun's energy into Kara to make her invincible, but stop when humanity is harmed by the loss of sunlight. The Allstone is formed, but Esme shatters it and Nyxly, Lex, and the Superfriends fight for its fragments. Nyxly mortally wounds Lillian and she and Lex depower humans in order to keep fighting each other.
126	20	"Kara"	Jesse Warn	Story by : Robert Rovner & Jessica Queller; Teleplay by : Rob Wright & Derek Simon	November 9, 2021	T13.22620	0.49
Lillian tells Lena to fully own her power and dies from her injuries. Kara reassures the people of humanity and they reclaim their power, weakening Lex and Nyxly. The Superfriends, joined by Acrata, Orlando, Mitch, Eliza Danvers, Mon-El, Winn Schott, and Jimmy Olsen, fight Lex, Nyxly, and manifestations of Overgirl, Red Tornado, Metallo, Parasite, the Hell Dragon, and the Nightmare Monster. Lex opens a portal to the Phantom Zone. Since they feed on fear and their supposed victims stand strong, the Phantoms drag Lex and Nyxly in. Days later, the Superfriends attend William's funeral and reform the DEO. Mon-El tells Kara that he will no longer be able to return to the past to see her, due to his responsibility with The Legion. Three weeks later, Cat Grant buys back CatCo from Andrea and offers Kara a job as her editor-in-chief. Alex and Kelly get married, and Brainy decides to stay in the present with Nia. Winn reveals that J'onn and M'gann have a son in the future. Cat, having revealed that she has always known of Kara's Supergirl identity, and Lena convince her to accept the job and end her double life so she can live a more full life as one person.

== Cast and characters ==
=== Main ===
- Melissa Benoist as Kara Danvers / Kara Zor-El / Supergirl
- Chyler Leigh as Alex Danvers / Sentinel
- Katie McGrath as Lena Luthor and Elizabeth Walsh
- Jesse Rath as Querl Dox / Brainiac 5
- Nicole Maines as Nia Nal / Dreamer
- Azie Tesfai as Kelly Olsen / Golden Guardian
- Julie Gonzalo as Andrea Rojas / Acrata
- Staz Nair as William Dey
- David Harewood as J'onn J'onzz / Martian Manhunter
- Peta Sergeant as Nyxlygsptlnz "Nyxly" (Note: Sergeant is credited as a series regular from (6.03) onwards.) and Nyxlygsptlnz A.I.

=== Recurring ===
- Jon Cryer as Lex Luthor
- Brenda Strong as Lillian Luthor
- Sharon Leal as M'gann M'orzz / Miss Martian
- Claude Knowlton as Silas White
- Jason Behr as Zor-El
- Matt Baram as Mitch
- Jhaleil Swaby as Orlando Davis
- Mila Jones as Esme
- Andrew Morgado as the voice of the Totem Oracles

=== Guest ===
- Cara Buono as Gamemnae / Gemma Cooper
- Andrea Brooks as Eve Teschmacher
- Robert Baker as Otis Graves
- Sandy Robson as Scar
- Simon Webb as Philippe
- Peter Sudarso as Kenny Li
- Chris William Martin as Naxim Tork
- Kate Burton as Isabel Nal
- Mark Sussman as the voice of Kelex
- Tom Jackson as Wyatt Kote
- Aiden Stoxx as Joey Davis
- Susan Hogan as Ms. Hoschchild
- Betty Buckley as the voice of the owl
- Kari Matchett as Councilwoman Jean Rankin
- Tom Lim as Dr. Desmond Raab
- Emmanuelle Vaugier as Margaret Bishop and Peggy Bishop
- Colleen Wheeler as Florence Abbott
- Thomas Lennon as Mister Mxyzptlk
- David Ramsey as John Diggle
- Izabela Vidovic as young Kara Danvers
- Olivia Nikkanen as young Alex Danvers
- Adrian Hough as King Brpxz
- Holly Deveaux as Dr. Beatrice Lahr
- Spencer John Borgeson as Prince Bryxly
- Hannah James as Maeve Nal
- Keith Dallas as Al Crane
- Mehcad Brooks as James Olsen / Guardian
- Jeremy Jordan as Winn Schott / Toyman
- Chris Wood as Mon-El
- Helen Slater as Eliza Danvers
- Calista Flockhart as Cat Grant
  - Eliza Helm as young Cat Grant

Cast notes

== Production ==
=== Development ===
In January 2020, The CW renewed the series for a sixth season. Jessica Queller and Robert Rovner return as the showrunners. In September 2020, it was announced that it would be the final season, with a 20-episode order.

=== Writing ===
The twelfth episode was written by Azie Tesfai and J. Holtham. This marks the first time in the Arrowverse that an actor (Tesfai) wrote an episode. Like previous seasons, the season too is inspired by sociopolitical issues in the real world, especially in its second half. Queller said the theme of the season would be "power, and the abuse of power, and the limits of powers, and from without and within". Rovner said the Black Lives Matter movement was another influence on the season. Melissa Benoist, who portrays Kara Danvers / Supergirl, said the season serves as a "self-exploration" for her character, "looking in the mirror and [contemplating] what her power means because it's almost limitless and it makes her so strong on Earth".

=== Casting ===
Main cast members Melissa Benoist, Chyler Leigh, Katie McGrath, Jesse Rath, Nicole Maines, Azie Tesfai, Julie Gonzalo, Staz Nair and David Harewood will return as Kara Danvers / Supergirl, Alex Danvers, Lena Luthor, Querl Dox / Brainiac 5, Nia Nal / Dreamer, Kelly Olsen, Andrea Rojas, William Dey, and J'onn J'onzz / Martian Manhunter. In December 2020, David Ramsey was revealed to be reprising his Arrow role of John Diggle in addition to directing at least one episode in the season. In March 2021, Claude Knowlton and Jason Behr joined the cast in undisclosed recurring roles for the sixth season. Knowlton's role turned out be Silas, while Behr's role turned out to be Zor-El, who was previously portrayed by Robert Gant in season one and season two. In the third episode, Peta Sergeant debuted as series regular as fifth-dimensional imp Nyxly, who would serve as the season's main villain.

=== Filming ===
Filming began on October 13, 2020. It was initially scheduled to begin after Benoist returned from maternity leave, but was later rescheduled to begin on September 28, 2020. However, by September 29, filming was indefinitely delayed, because of delays in receiving COVID-19 test results for the cast and crew, before beginning in October. The early filming of the season worked around Benoist's absence until she returned to work in January 2021. Filming concluded on August 6, 2021.

== Marketing ==
In early August 2020, The CW released several posters of the Arrowverse superheroes wearing face masks, including Supergirl, with all posters having the caption "Real Heroes Wear Masks". This marketing tactic was used to "raise public awareness on the efficacy of facial coverings preventing the spread of COVID-19".

== Broadcast ==
The sixth and final season was originally scheduled to premiere in mid-2021. However, Superman & Lois went on hiatus due to a production delay caused by COVID-19, so the season premiered early on March 30, 2021. The season continued on August 24, 2021, after Superman & Lois finished its first season.

== Reception ==
Viewership and ratings per episode of Supergirl season 6
No.	Title	Air date	Rating (18–49)	Viewers (millions)	DVR (18–49)	DVR viewers (millions)	Total (18–49)	Total viewers (millions)
1	"Rebirth"	March 30, 2021	0.1	0.73	—N/a	—N/a	—N/a	—N/a
2	"A Few Good Women"	April 6, 2021	0.2	0.69	0.2	0.65	0.4	1.34
3	"Phantom Menaces"	April 13, 2021	0.2	0.59	0.2	0.59	0.4	1.18
4	"Lost Souls"	April 20, 2021	0.1	0.59	0.2	0.49	0.3	1.08
5	"Prom Night"	April 27, 2021	0.1	0.50	0.2	0.52	0.3	1.05
6	"Prom Again!"	May 4, 2021	0.1	0.62	0.2	0.54	0.3	1.15
7	"Fear Knot"	May 11, 2021	0.1	0.47	0.2	0.53	0.3	1.00
8	"Welcome Back, Kara!"	August 24, 2021	0.1	0.56	—N/a	—N/a	—N/a	—N/a
9	"Dream Weaver"	August 31, 2021	0.1	0.59	—N/a	—N/a	—N/a	—N/a
10	"Still I Rise"	September 7, 2021	0.1	0.48	—N/a	—N/a	—N/a	—N/a
11	"Mxy in the Middle"	September 14, 2021	0.1	0.40	—N/a	—N/a	—N/a	—N/a
12	"Blind Spots"	September 21, 2021	0.1	0.48	—N/a	—N/a	—N/a	—N/a
13	"The Gauntlet"	September 28, 2021	0.1	0.40	—N/a	—N/a	—N/a	—N/a
14	"Magical Thinking"	October 5, 2021	0.1	0.42	—N/a	—N/a	—N/a	—N/a
15	"Hope for Tomorrow"	October 12, 2021	0.1	0.38	0.1	0.39	0.2	0.77
16	"Nightmare in National City"	October 19, 2021	0.1	0.42	0.1	0.34	0.2	0.76
17	"I Believe in a Thing Called Love"	October 26, 2021	0.1	0.45	—N/a	—N/a	—N/a	—N/a
18	"Truth or Consequences"	November 2, 2021	0.1	0.40	—N/a	—N/a	—N/a	—N/a
19	"The Last Gauntlet"	November 9, 2021	0.1	0.59	—N/a	—N/a	—N/a	—N/a
20	"Kara"	November 9, 2021	0.1	0.49	—N/a	—N/a	—N/a	—N/a
