= Kara (Supergirl episode) =

- Supergirl episode
- The Superfriends preparing for their finale showdown against Nyxly and Lex.
- Episode no.: Season 6 Episode 20
- Directed by: Jesse Warn
- Story by: Robert Rovner; Jessica Queller
- Teleplay by: Rob Wright; Derek Simon
- Original air date: November 9, 2021

Guest appearances
- Calista Flockhart as Cat Grant (special appearance); Jon Cryer as Lex Luthor (special guest star); Jeremy Jordan as Winn Schott / Toyman (special guest star); Chris Wood as Mon-El (special guest starring); Helen Slater as Eliza Danvers (special guest star); Mehcad Brooks as Jimmy Olsen (special guest star); Brenda Strong as Lillian Luthor; Matt Baram as Mitch; Mila Jones as Esme; Jhaleil Swaby as Orlando Davis; Crystal Balint as Secretary Brown

Episode chronology
← Previous "The Last Gauntlet"	Next → —
- Supergirl (season 6)

"Kara" is the series finale of the American TV series Supergirl, based on the DC Comics character Kara Zor-El / Supergirl. It is set in the Arrowverse, sharing continuity with the other television series of the universe. The twentieth episode of the sixth season and 126th episode overall, it was written by Rob Wright and Derek Simon from a story by showrunners Robert Rovner and Jessica Queller, and directed by Jesse Warn. The episode aired on November 9, 2021 on The CW.

Melissa Benoist stars as Kara, and is joined by principal cast members Chyler Leigh, Katie McGrath, Jesse Rath, Nicole Maines, Azie Tesfai, Julie Gonzalo, Peta Sergeant and David Harewood. The episode sees Kara being aided by several old allies in her fight against Nyxly and Lex Luthor. Several former series regulars make guest appearances, including Mehcad Brooks, Chris Wood, Jeremy Jordan, and Calista Flockhart.

== Plot ==
The episode opens on a news broadcast showing the effects of the previous episode. Lena along with the wounded Lillian Luthor watch the broadcast. Then before succumbing to her wounds Lillian tells Lena to fully own her power and dies.

In a last-ditch effort to counteract the effects of the battle between Lex Luthor and Nyxly, Kara Danvers / Supergirl delivers a speech to the people of humanity and they reclaim their power. This turns out to be successful and weakens Lex and Nyxly.

Kara and the rest of the Superfriends prepare for a final showdown with the now allied Lex and Nyxly. Nyxly and Lex summon an army made up of manifestation of previous enemies from the show including Overgirl, Red Tornado, Metallo, Parasite, the Hell Dragon, and the Nightmare Monster. Midway through the fighting several former allies arrive and assist the Superfriends. These include Acrata, Orlando Davis, Mitch, Eliza Danvers, Mon-El, Winn Schott, and Jimmy Olsen. Lex opens a portal to the Phantom Zone. However, due to the fact that they feed on fear and their supposed victims stand strong, the Phantoms instead target Lex and Nyxly.

Days later, the Superfriends attend William Dey's funeral and reestablish the DEO. Mon-El tells Kara that he will no longer be able to return to the past to see her, due to his responsibility with The Legion. Three weeks later, Kara receives a call from Cat Grant who informs her that she has re-bought CatCo and offers Kara a job as her editor-in-chief.

Alex Danvers and Kelly Olsen get married. At the wedding Brainy reveals that he has decided to stay in the present with Nia Nal. Alex and Kelly ask Lena to be Esme's godmother to which she accepts. Kara, James, and Winn reminisce about the previous adventures.

Cat calls Kara again and convinces her to take the job as editor-in-chief and reveal her identity so she can live a more full life as one person. The wedding ends with a shot of a car flying away with a sign reading "Just Married". The episode concludes with an interview broadcast by Cat, in which she publicly reveals Kara to be Supergirl.

== Production ==
=== Development ===
In late October 2021, it was announced that the series finale of the American TV series Supergirl would be a two part episode with the first part being "The Last Gauntlet" and the second part being "Kara". The episode, which is the twentieth episode of the sixth season and 126th episode overall, was directed by Jesse Warn, and written by Rob Wright & Derek Simon from a story by showrunners Robert Rovner & Jessica Queller.

=== Casting ===
Main cast members Melissa Benoist, Chyler Leigh, Katie McGrath, Jesse Rath, Nicole Maines, Azie Tesfai, Julie Gonzalo, Peta Sergeant and David Harewood appear as Kara Danvers / Supergirl, Alex Danvers / Sentinel, Lena Luthor, Querl Dox / Brainiac 5, Nia Nal, Kelly Olsen, Andrea Rojas / Acrata, Nyxly and J'onn J'onzz / Martian Manhunter. Former regulars Mehcad Brooks, Chris Wood, Jeremy Jordan and Calista Flockhart guest star as Jimmy Olsen, Mon-El, Winn Schott and Cat Grant. Benoist said it "would not have felt right" if Brooks, Wood and Jordan did not return. The additional guest cast includes Jon Cryer as Lex Luthor, Brenda Strong as Lillian Luthor, Helen Slater as Eliza Danvers, Matt Baram as Mitch, Mila Jones as Esme, Jhaleil Swaby as Orlando Davis and Crystal Balint as Secretary Brown.

=== Filming ===
Filming on the episode began in late July 2021, and ended in early August. As per the original filming schedule, Benoist would be the last actor to shoot, but she, Leigh and Harewood pushed for rearrangement so that all three of them would together finish the final filming day.

== Reception ==
=== Ratings ===
"Kara" premiered in the United States on The CW on November 9, 2021. It was watched by 0.49 million viewers with a 0.2 share among adults aged 18 to 49.

=== Critical response ===
Amelia Emberwing of IGN gave the episode a rating of 9 out of 10, saying despite the lack of action, "it ends on the exact note it was always meant to. It [leans] into every aspect that show's detractors ever called it weak for, and it's all the stronger because of it". Caroline Siede of The A.V. Club gave the episode a B rating, saying it "stumbles through some messy plotting before delivering a pitch-perfect farewell". Michael Patterson of Bam Smack Pow gave the episode an A rating, saying, "Supergirl bows out on a heartfelt note, revisiting its past to move into the future (and bringing back a few familiar faces in the process), and it all ensures that Kara Danvers' moving story ends on the highest of highs".
