= Lex Luthor (Arrowverse) =

Fictional character in the Arrowverse

- Arrowverse character
- First appearance: "Luthors"; Supergirl; February 13, 2017
- Last appearance: "Kara"; Supergirl; November 9, 2021
- Based on: Lex Luthor by: Jerry Siegel; Joe Shuster
- Adapted by: Glen Winter; Greg Berlanti
- Portrayed by: Jon Cryer; Aidan Fink (young; season 2); Koby Holvik (young; season 4)

In-universe information
- Full name: Alexander Joseph Luthor
- Alias: Paragon of Truth
- Position: United States Secretary of Alien Affairs (formerly)
- Affiliation: Luthor Corp; U.S. Government
- Weapon: Lexosuit; Guns; Book of Destiny (former)
- Family: Lionel Luthor (father, deceased); Lillian Luthor (mother, deceased); Lena Luthor (half-sister)
- Significant others: Eve Teschmacher (former); Nyxlygsptlnz
- Home: Earth-38 (former); Earth-Prime (Note: After Crisis on Infinite Earths.)
- Nationality: American

Alexander Joseph Luthor is a supervillain in The CW's Arrowverse, based on the character of the same name created by Jerry Siegel and Joe Shuster. Adapted for television in 2017 by Glen Winter and Greg Berlanti, he made his first appearance in the Supergirl episode "Luthors". Both Aidan Fink and Jon Cryer portrayed versions of the supervillain, with Fink portraying a young Lex Luthor and Cryer portraying Lex as an adult.

In the Arrowverse, Luthor is an independent businessman who runs a company called LuthorCorp, and is also the arch-nemesis of Superman. Formerly, Luthor and Superman were friends; their friendship ended when Superman refused to embrace Luthor's violent and chaotic ideology. Luthor then developed an obsession with Superman, resulting in his eventual imprisonment. Later, he perceives Supergirl as a threat and shifts his focus towards her.

== Concept and creation ==
Lex Luthor made his debut in Action Comics #23 in 1940. Since then, Luthor has become one of the most recognizable and prominent supervillain characters in DC Comics. According to IGN, he ranks fourth on a list of one hundred supervillains across media. The character has previously been portrayed in live-action TV shows, including Superboy, Lois & Clark: The New Adventures of Superman, and Smallville. Scott James Wells and Sherman Howard portrayed him in Superboy, John Shea in Lois & Clark, and Michael Rosenbaum in Smallville. Luthor has also appeared in movies such as Atom Man vs. Superman, the classic Superman film series, Superman Returns, Batman v Superman: Dawn of Justice, and Justice League. The character has been portrayed by Lyle Talbot, Gene Hackman, Kevin Spacey, and Jesse Eisenberg.

When a Supergirl-centric TV show was announced, speculation arose about whether Luthor would appear. The character made an appearance in the episode "Luthors" during Supergirl's second season, with Aidan Fink portraying a young Lex Luthor. Eventually, Jon Cryer appeared in season 4 as an adult Lex Luthor, in a recurring capacity as the "big bad" of the season. He later returned for season 5 and season 6 as a recurring character and the primary villain of those episodes. Luthor also played a crucial role in the Arrowverse crossover event titled "Crisis on Infinite Earths" in 2019 and 2020.

=== Casting ===
Jon Cryer was cast as Lex Luthor in 2017. He was the first and only choice of producers Robert Rovner and Jessica Queller, who admitted to being his biggest fans. When asked about his portrayal, Cryer responded that it was a "lovely" experience, and he wanted to do justice to the character in the show. Cryer had previously portrayed Lenny Luthor, the nephew of Hackman's version of Lex Luthor, in Superman IV: The Quest for Peace (1987). Cryer stated one reason for accepting the role in Supergirl was wanting to do justice to the Luthor name after the negative response to Superman IV: The Quest for Peace. Producer Jessica Queller expressed her satisfaction with Cryer's casting, stating, "I don't think we could have possibly done better in our casting, and I mean, we're just thrilled."

=== Characterization ===
According to Jon Cryer, Lex Luthor is a sociopath with only one true link to reality, his sister Lena Luthor. He highlighted Luthor's intelligence and focus on science while acknowledging that his narcissism causes problems for everyone else. When asked what it is like to play a villain, Cryer said he was still getting used to the role and found it challenging.

Cryer also pointed out that Luthor displays manipulative behavior towards others in the series, viewing them as inferiors. Regarding his character's development in season 6, where Luthor falls in love with the character Nyxlygsptlnz, Cryer admitted he was initially scared about removing Luthor's "dark side." He questioned why Luthor would fall in love, considering his nature. However, he eventually embraced the storyline and enjoyed playing the character.

Cryer had a strong influence in the show's usage of the character. He was a strong advocate for Luthor eventually defeating Supergirl, and he pitched this idea numerous times to the show's producers. He also requested that Luthor be a part of "Crisis on Infinite Earths," despite the studio not initially planning to include him. Cryer believed that Luthor's role in Marv Wolfman's and George Pérez's 1985 original comic book storyline was important, and not having him in the event would be "humiliating."

== Fictional character biography ==
=== Early life ===
Lex Luthor was born sometime after 1984 in Metropolis to billionaires Lionel and Lillian Luthor. From early childhood, he exhibited an extremely high intellect, as well as anti-social behavior. In 1997, the Luthor family adopted Lena, the illegitimate daughter of Lionel and Lex's half-sister, which angered him initially. However, over time, Lex and Lena became close friends.

During his teenage years, Lex showed signs of psychopathy. His father, Lionel, distanced himself from Lex, fueling Lex's resentment and hatred towards him. After Lionel's death, Lex inherited the family company, LuthorCorp. He also met Superman, and the two initially worked together to stop alien invasions. However, Lex's methods were too brutal for Superman's liking, leading to a falling out between them. Lex began to believe that Superman was responsible for the invasions, and his obsession with the superhero caused a fracture in his relationship with Lena.

=== Scheme to kill Supergirl ===
After years of encounters resulting in numerous fatalities, Luthor and Superman had a final confrontation in early 2016. Before the confrontation, Luthor turned Earth's yellow sun red in an attempt to depower Superman, causing destruction on a global scale. Luthor was found by the police but managed to escape, only to later be captured by Superman.

At his trial, Luthor killed the judge and jury. He was sentenced to thirty-one consecutive life terms and sent to Stryker's Island Penitentiary. While in prison, he hired an assassin, John Corben, to kill his sister Lena, who had taken over LuthorCorp (later renamed L-Corp). His plan failed when Superman and Supergirl intervened.

In 2018, the Minister of Defense of Kaznia informed Luthor about the existence of a copy of Supergirl. Luthor traveled with the minister to Kazakhstan to meet the duplicate and began her training. After months of training, he took her to National City to familiarize her with Supergirl's life. The Supergirl duplicate developed a sickness, and to save her, Luthor entered a radioactive chamber, giving him cancer. Luthor was granted a mercy furlough from prison and was transported to his mansion.

Luthor then orchestrated a plan in which his assassin and love interest, Eve Teschmacher, would shoot James Olsen and distract Lena. As Lena went to the hospital, Luthor cut the electricity, forcing her to inject James with an experimental vaccine to save his life, in the hope that it would also cure Luthor's cancer. The vaccine worked, curing Luthor and giving him superhuman powers. He battled Supergirl and later went to the White House to meet with the President, using his influence to arrange a Kaznian attack on the United States.

During the attack, Luthor manipulated the Supergirl duplicate, known as "Red Daughter," to kill Supergirl's mother. After the attack, Luthor seemingly killed Red Daughter and used her energy to power a special cell. He then supplied energy to the houses damaged by the Kaznian bombings, and, with the President's support, he became the Secretary of the United States Department of Alien Affairs, gaining control over America.

Luthor's ambitions extended further, and he invaded Argo City. A team led by Supergirl stopped his attack, and he battled Supergirl, ultimately losing. He went to a cabin where he and Lena had spent vacations, where Lena extracted the serum from his body, resulting in his death.

=== Joining the Crisis ===
At the beginning of the Anti-Monitor's invasion of the Multiverse, the Monitor brought Luthor back from the dead to assist the heroes. In return, Luthor asked him to ensure that Lena maintained her Pre-Crisis memories. The Monitor brought him to the Waverider, where he met a furious Kara Danvers and Kate Kane / Batwoman. He then found the Book of Destiny on the ship and left to kill as many versions of Superman as he could.

His first target was Earth-75's Superman, whom he killed. He then traveled to Earth-167 with the same intentions, but learned that Clark Kent had given up his powers. Next, Luthor went to Earth-96 and used the Book of Destiny to brainwash Clark Kent / Superman to fight the Superman from Luthor's universe. However, the Lois Lane from Luthor's universe intervened and knocked Luthor out, ending his control.

Luthor was locked up on the Waverider, but he managed to get the Book of Destiny again. He used it to save himself from the anti-matter wave that destroyed the Waverider and the whole Multiverse. By doing so, he became known as the Paragon of Truth and transported himself to the Vanishing Point.

At the Vanishing Point, Luthor attempted to open a portal to reality with the help of Ryan Choi, but failed. Barry Allen / The Flash later returned from the Speed Force, unable to find a way out of the point. Oliver Queen / Spectre appeared and helped Barry unlock his full potential, sending Luthor, Kara, and Ryan to the past, specifically to the planet Maltus, 10,000 years before the Monitor created the Anti-Monitor. There, Luthor tried to betray his team, but he failed to get the Monitor to side with him. The team was then transported to the Dawn of Time to fight the Anti-Monitor. Luthor and the other Paragons fought the Anti-Monitor's army, and Oliver sacrificed himself to recreate the Multiverse.

In the new Multiverse, Luthor's Earth merged with Earth-1 and Jefferson Pierce / Black Lightning's Earth. As a result, Luthor was seen by the public as a hero. In this new reality, he became the owner of LuthorCorp and the leader of the Department of Extranormal Operations, which was now a subsidiary of his company. Luthor also became a Nobel Peace Prize winner.

=== Manipulating Brainiac 5 and Obsidian Tech ===
At some point, Lex Luthor meets with his mother, Lillian, who is now the head of the Luthor Foundation, and they started scheming to destroy the Fortress of Solitude. To win Lena over, Lex used a truth-inducing organism on his arm to prove his honesty. At a "Man of Tomorrow" event held by the Luthor family, reporter William Dey privately talked to Kara, voicing his suspicion that the Luthors were involved in the disappearance of Russell Rogers after they bought out his company. Brainiac 5 later visited Luthor, expressing concern about Leviathan, and showed him a picture of a possible doppelganger that resembles Winn Schott.

Luthor visits Gamemnae / Gemma Cooper and persuades her to arrange a collaboration between LuthorCorp and Obsidian Tech. After Brainiac 5 becomes the new Director of the D.E.O. following Alex Danvers's resignation, he gives Luthor the information he needs from the alternate Winn Schott / Toyman's A.I. hacking. Luthor then tracks down Gemma and offers a partnership between LuthorCorp and Obsidian Tech. From the first day of Earth-Prime, Luthor had manipulated Eve Teschmacher into being his inside person in Leviathan. He tricks her into killing Jeremiah Danvers. While Supergirl is preventing a Sun-Eater from eating the Sun, Luthor goes to the scene where those who were trapped in virtual reality are being held and frees them, killing Margot Morrison. Gemma confronts Luthor about his actions, and he states that she should focus her anger on their mutual enemy, Supergirl. Later that night, Luthor reveals to Eve that the people who had protected her mother will dispose of her should she go against him. He also has footage of Eve killing Jeremiah. When Eve states that he is worse than Leviathan, Luthor disagrees. After a talk with his mother, Luthor uses Lena's transportation watch to go to the Fortress of Solitude.

Luthor visits Lena at Stryker's Island, noting that her project would fail, causing Lena to see that Kara was right about Luthor. After getting a call from Gemma that Rama Khan succeeded in his mission to obtain the Kryptonite from the D.E.O., Luthor informs Brainiac 5 that they now have access to Leviathan's ship. When he enters the ship, Luthor is given a special pin by Gemma to keep him safe from the ship's defenses. After Brainiac 5 enters a code that leads to the bottling of Rama Khan, Tezumak, and Sela, Gemma briefly shuts down, causing Luthor to go after Brainiac 5. He finds a weakened Brainiac 5 on Leviathan's ship and claims the bottle contains Rama Khan, Tezumak, and Sela. After getting away, he gives the bottle to Lillian to begin their next plot.

=== Final battle against Supergirl ===
Lex Luthor proceeds with the next phase of his plan, having Lillian copy the powers of the Leviathan members into him, despite her warning of the potential outcome. During the fight at the Fortress of Solitude with Supergirl, Luthor manages to use the Phantom Zone Projector to send Supergirl into the Phantom Zone. He is subsequently arrested and put on trial. While incarcerated at National City Prison, Luthor is visited by Lillian, who reminds him that she warned him. Lena then arrives and uses the brainwashing machine, Myriad, to erase the memory of Supergirl's identity from their minds. In the trial, Lena testifies against him, revealing that he used brainwashing technology to manipulate the jury. To his shock, the verdict is that he is innocent.

Afterward, Lex and Lena engage in a power struggle for control of LuthorCorp. Lex sends his bodyguard, Otis Graves, to sabotage the new children's wing at the hospital. When Lena confronts him, she tells him that killing him won't change anything, and she decides to leave LuthorCorp.

Luthor later visits the future, where he befriends and falls in love with a future version of Nyxlygsptlnz, known as "Nyxly." Together, they combine science and magic, but Nyxly makes a mistake with the Totems, resulting in her death. Luthor preserves Nyxly's mind in the form of an A.I. and places it in a Lexosuit, which he sends to the present Nyxly to prevent her death. However, the present Nyxly wants nothing to do with him. Undeterred, Luthor tries to win her back with Otis's advice, but Nyxly rejects him. Luthor devises a plan to get the Love Totem to her, but Nyxly is not pleased with his involvement, and the Superfriends end up with the totem.

Luthor saves Nyxly from being imprisoned, revealing their future romance and his attempts to save her. With the help of the Nyxly A.I., Nyxly obtains the dream totem, and Luthor assists in obtaining the remaining Totems. The Superfriends manage to retrieve the other pieces of the Totems, leading to a final battle between Luthor, Nyxly, and the Superfriends. Luthor and Nyxly create magical constructs resembling their enemies, such as Kara Danvers / Overgirl, Red Tornado, Metallo, and dragons. In the end, they are defeated, and Luthor opens a portal to the Phantom Zone, intending to unleash Phantoms on the Superfriends. However, due to their hubris, the Phantoms are instead attracted to Luthor and Nyxly, dragging them into the Phantom Zone. This is made possible because Supergirl and her allies rallied the people of National City to have courage, which counteracts the hubris emitted by Luthor and Nyxly, making them prime targets for the Phantoms.

== Appearances ==
=== Arrowverse ===
- The character first appeared in the episode "Luthors" of Supergirl season 2, portrayed by Aidan Fink as a young Lex Luthor, in 2017.
- Jon Cryer made his first appearance as Lex Luthor in the episode "O Brother, Where Art Thou?" of season 4, in 2019. He later appeared in the crossover event, Crisis on Infinite Earths, as well as the shows Batwoman, The Flash, Arrow, and Legends of Tomorrow, all in 2019 and 2020.

== Alternate versions ==
=== Superman & Lois ===
An alternate version of Lex Luthor was mentioned in two episodes of Superman & Lois in 2021. The John Henry Irons of an alternate Earth stole an exosuit from his reality's Luthor, which he used in the fight against his world's Superman and Tal-Rho. This Luthor was erased from existence by the Anti-Monitor during the Crisis on Infinite Earths.

Lex Luthor appears in season 3 of the show, portrayed by Michael Cudlitz. The episode "Too Close to Home" had Bruno Mannheim mentioning to John Henry Irons that Luthor was responsible for killing Boss Moxie. However, it is later revealed that Luthor's recorded confession to the crime was falsified, and it was Mannheim's wife, Peia, who confessed while disguising her voice as Luthor's, leading Clark and Lois to realize that Luthor is innocent. Flashbacks reveal that Luthor went to Lois to plead his case in person and implore her to not publish the story without investigating further, but she refused.

In flashbacks seen in the episode "Injustice," Luthor was sentenced to life at Stryker's Prison by Judge Tara Reagan. When he finds Otis Grisham working on an inmate's hair with an electric razor, Luthor asks to rent it so that he can do his hair himself, promising him future opportunities in exchange for his loyalty. Otis attacks Luthor when his promises turn into threats, resulting in Otis and the nearby inmates beating him. When meeting with Warden William Ellis, Luthor has him call a specific number that turns out to be Warden Ellis' home number. Upon answering it, he finds that Luthor's associates on the outside have threatened his family, and Luthor blackmails him into allowing him to run the prison population. Warden Ellis complies with his demands. Luthor starts by having the guards beat up Otis and the others who beat Lex. Warden Ellis later procures Luthor a razor, which he uses to shave his head. Once the shaving is done, Luthor has an inmate recuperating in a wheelchair sweep up the hair. One inmate with missing teeth takes down his meal order, and Otis serves as his chair. Luthor however later makes good on his promise of more opportunities and secures an early release for Otis for his loyalty.

Following Peia's death and Bruno's confession, Luthor is released from prison upon the truth being made known. Luthor walks down the street until he arrives at the Kent family farm. While noting how he knows about what happened to Bruno Mannheim, Lois's cancer treatment, and how she and Clark have two sons, Luthor states that he does not want their apologies and instead furiously orders Lois to retire. As Otis (who now serves as his right-hand man) arrives to pick up Luthor, Luthor orders Lois to tell Superman that he'll be coming for him. Upon arrival in the ruins of Mannheim's base, they find a mutated Bizarro feeding off some rats. With help from Otis, Luthor performs various experiments on Bizarro to cause him to further mutate. After arranging for Judge Reagan to be killed offscreen, Luthor dispatches Otis and his female minion, Cheryl Kimble (under the name "Gretchen Kelley"), to abduct Sam Lane. Luthor then confronts Superman at the Kent farm as he summons a now monstrous Bizarro, dubbed Doomsday. While leaving, Luthor orders Doomsday to bring him Superman's heart when he is done with him.

In season four, Lex Luthor moves into the hotel across from the Smallville Gazette and later meets with Amanda McCoy who hasn't located Elizabeth yet. Before having Otis and Cheryl bury Sam Lane alive, he shows Sam a newspaper article about Superman being in peril. When he hears that Sam has been rescued, Luthor instructs Otis and Cheryl to lay low for awhile. After throwing a defeated Superman's body to the Kent family, Doomsday gives Superman's heart to Luthor as he places it in a device that a LuthorCorp worker named Milton created. A disguised Jordan later confronts Lex Luthor during his and Amanda's meeting with Sebastian "Bash" Mallory demanding he return Superman's heart to no avail. Lex later dines at the diner as Sarah tries to stall them. When Lana arrives, she scolds Sarah for interacting with him as they find that Lex had left.

Lois receives a call from Lex using Superman's voice giving her the number options on which son he should spare. As Jordan looks around a warehouse upon detecting a heartbeat, he is ambushed by Lex's minions with Kryptonite weapons as Lex uses a high frequency sound to weaken him and apparently crushes Superman's heart under his foot. Lex is told by Amanda McCoy that they can use the Manning farm to set up their new base and that Sam Lane was responsible for Elizabeth's relocation. After briefly visiting Jordan to reveal that Lois chose to save Jonathan in that phone choice she received, Lex sends Doomsday to the Department of Defence to intimidate Sam into giving him the location of Elizabeth, but Sam refuses and Lex orders Doomsday to kill Sam, unaware that Sam had injected himself with a serum containing Superman's blood so his heart could be used to revive Superman. After learning of Superman's return, Luthor returns to Smallvile, but both Clark and Lois try to appeal to Luthor as a father by promising him a meeting with Elizabeth, who they located in France.

At Victoria May's, Luthor and Elizabeth share an uneasy reunion and Luthor reveals the truth about his childhood when he was abused by his parents. Elizabeth agrees to give Luthor a chance on the condition that he leave the Kents alone, but he refuses and she leaves, telling him not to contact her again. Luthor goes to summon Doomsday to set him on Superman again, but sees that he is missing, unaware that Lois summoned him and managed to break him free from Luthor's control by reminding him of his past as Bizarro Kal-El and his love for his family. Slowly losing control, Luthor's plans to purchase land in Smallville to build his new HQ are derailed by Mayor Lana Lang and the townspeople who start to rebel against him. Luthor sends Otis to kill Lana but he fails and is taken into custody. He is confronted by an enraged Clark who threatens to kill him, but Luthor activates red solar lights hidden inside Smallville's street lamps and attacks Clark, but Clark fights back and severely beats him, ordering him to leave Smallville and never return.

Luthor returns to Metropolis, where Amanda suggests that he use a "killer suit". After shaving off his goatee, Lex is persuaded by Amanda to do an interview with Gordon Godfrey. Though he sees various viabilities that would cause him to change his mind, Lex is persuaded by Amanda to go on with the interview. During the interview as Lex and Lois tell their sides of the story, Lois tries to call Elizabeth to talk about Lex only for it to get ruined when Superman fights John Henry Irons' hacked armor. Afterwards, Lex makes out with Amanda as they find that Milton is working on the upgrades to John's stolen armor. During the upgrades, via the suit's memory banks, Milton discovers Doomsday in the Shuster mines trying to get back to his world. Abandoning his original plan, Luthor dons the suit despite Amanda's protests and confronts Doomsday in the mines, swaying him to his side once more by killing him with kryptonite bombs and mutating him further with the intention of unleashing him on Smallville as revenge for the town rebelling against him.

Luthor subsequently watches the ensuing fight between Superman and Doomsday, intending to watch Superman die with his own eyes, but hears that Amanda has abandoned him and flies off to kill her, though he is thwarted by Jordan and Jon. He attacks the boys but is stopped by Superman, who defeated Doomsday by taking him to the Sun and healing his wounds. In the ensuing fight, Luthor shoots Superman with kryptonite drills but is still defeated when Superman punches his suit with enough power to shatter it, though he saves Luthor from falling to his death. One year later, Amanda's subsequent testimony sends Luthor back to Stryker's for life, where he is accosted by Mannheim, who now runs the prison and intends to take revenge for Luthor having Cheryl murdered, since she was Mannheim's friend. Luthor presumably passes away in prison.

In the epilogue set thirty-two years later, after Clark dies of heart failure and his spirit enters the afterlife, he comes across the spirit of a now repentant and remorseful Luthor. Clark sits by Luthor and places his hand on his shoulder as a gesture of forgiveness.

== Reception ==
Many fans pointed out similarities and differences between Cryer's and Jesse Eisenberg's portrayals of Luthor, with some suggesting that Cryer's was better at manipulation and more comic-accurate. However, some critics felt that his version lacked clear direction. In the book "Adapting Superman: Essays on the Transmedia Man of Steel," there is a chapter titled "Forging Kryptonite: Lex Luthor's Xenophobia as Societal Fracturing, from Batman v Superman to Supergirl," which analyzes both versions of Lex Luthor as part of a representation exploring the cultural effects of encroaching xenophobia from society to the family in the years around the 2016 United States presidential election. Comparisons were also made with Michael Rosenbaum's version.

In an interview with the website CBR.com, Cryer claimed that the ending of Supergirl's season 6 was intentionally left open for a potential return of his character in another Arrowverse or another DC show in the future. IGN asserted Cryer's version was the definitive one and praised his performance, noting that it had a significant impact on the "Crisis on Infinite Earths" crossover event and Supergirl's season 5.

Michael Cudlitz's portrayal as Luthor in Superman & Lois has also been met with positive reviews, with Screen Rant referring to him as "the most terrifying villain the DC series has ever seen".

=== Accolades ===
Year	Award	Category	Work	Result	Ref.
2019	Teen Choice Awards	Choice TV Villain	Supergirl	Won	
2019	Saturn Awards	Best Guest Starring Role on Television	Supergirl	Nominated	
2021	Saturn Awards	Best Guest Starring Role on Television	Supergirl	Won	

== In other media ==
The character appears in the Crisis on Infinite Earths tie-in comic book one-shot titled "Crisis on Infinite Earths Giant #1, where Luthor joins other universes' Luthors. Together they form the Council of Luthors, with the common goal of killing all Supermen and defeating the Council of Supermen. The Council of Luthors fails in its mission.

== See also ==
- Lex Luthor in other media
  - Lex Luthor (Smallville)
  - Lex Luthor (DC Extended Universe)
  - Lex Luthor (1978 film series character)
- List of Superman supporting characters
