= Supergirl (TV series) =

2015 American superhero television series

- Genre: Action; Drama; Political; Science fiction; Superhero
- Based on: Kara Zor-El by: Otto Binder; Al Plastino; DC Comics
- Developed by: Greg Berlanti
- Showrunners: Greg Berlanti; Andrew Kreisberg; Ali Adler; Robert Rovner; Jessica Queller
- Starring: Melissa Benoist; Mehcad Brooks; Chyler Leigh; Jeremy Jordan; David Harewood; Calista Flockhart; Chris Wood; Floriana Lima; Katie McGrath; Odette Annable; Jesse Rath; Sam Witwer; Nicole Maines; April Parker Jones; Azie Tesfai; Andrea Brooks; Julie Gonzalo; Staz Nair; LaMonica Garrett; Peta Sergeant
- Composers: Blake Neely & Daniel James Chan
- Country of origin: United States
- Original language: English
- No. of seasons: 6
- No. of episodes: 126 (list of episodes)

Production
- Executive producers: Sarah Schechter; Ali Adler; Andrew Kreisberg; Greg Berlanti; Robert Rovner; Jessica Queller
- Producers: Michael Grassi; Ted Sullivan; Michael Cedar; Larry Teng; Glen Winter; Raymond Quinlan
- Production locations: Los Angeles, California (season 1); Vancouver, British Columbia (seasons 2–6)
- Cinematography: Michael Barrett; David Stockton; Jeffery C. Mygatt; Shamus Whiting-Hewett
- Editors: Andi Armaganian; Barbara Gerard; Harry Jierjian
- Camera setup: Single-camera
- Running time: 38–47 minutes
- Production companies: Berlanti Productions; DC Entertainment; Warner Bros. Television

Original release
- Network: CBS
- Release: October 26, 2015 – April 18, 2016
- Network: The CW
- Release: October 10, 2016 – November 9, 2021

Related
- Arrowverse; Superman & Lois

Supergirl is an American superhero drama television series developed by Ali Adler, Greg Berlanti and Andrew Kreisberg that aired on CBS from October 26, 2015, to April 8, 2016, and The CW from October 10, 2016, to November 9, 2021. Based on the DC Comics character created by Otto Binder and Al Plastino, the series follows Kara Zor-El (played by Melissa Benoist), Superman's cousin, and one of the last surviving Kryptonians from the planet Krypton. As Supergirl, Kara uses her powers to protect National City. The series was retroactively incorporated into the Arrowverse beginning with its second season, and became definitively linked with the rest of the franchise in the fifth season.

The series was officially picked up on May 6, 2015, after receiving a full series commitment in September 2014. Following a full season order on November 30, 2015, it transitioned to The CW for its second season going forward.

Supergirl received positive-to-mixed reviews from critics, with praise for its creative direction and cast performances (especially Benoist's), though its handling of political themes such as empowerment and social justice was criticized by some audiences. It won the Most Exciting New Series at the 5th Critics' Choice Television Awards in 2015. The television series Superman & Lois was developed as a direct spin-off of Supergirl with Tyler Hoechlin and Elizabeth Tulloch reprising their Arrowverse roles; however, after COVID-19 restrictions led to a planned first season crossover with Supergirl being cancelled, creative redevelopment led to the series being retconned as being set in its own continuity from its second season onward, with no narrative ties to Supergirl, rendering it a stand-alone spin-off.

== Series overview ==
Overview of Supergirl seasons
Season	Episodes	Originally released			Rank	Average viewership (in millions)
Season	Episodes	First released	Last released	Network	Rank	Average viewership (in millions)
1	20	October 26, 2015	April 18, 2016	CBS	39	9.81
2	22	October 10, 2016	May 22, 2017	The CW	129	3.12
3	23	October 9, 2017	June 18, 2018	The CW	154	2.82
4	22	October 14, 2018	May 19, 2019	The CW	169	1.67
5	19	October 6, 2019	May 17, 2020	The CW	118	1.58
6	20	March 30, 2021	November 9, 2021	The CW	140	1.17

Kara Zor-El was sent to Earth from Krypton as a 13-year-old by her parents, Zor-El and Alura. Kara was tasked with protecting her infant cousin, Kal-El, but her spacecraft was knocked off course and trapped in the Phantom Zone for 24 years. By the time her spacecraft crash-landed on Earth, Kal-El had already grown up and become Superman. The series begins 12 years later, with Kara embracing her superhuman powers and adopting the superhero alias "Supergirl".

Season 1

In Season 1, Kara reveals her powers to become National City's protector. She discovers that numerous criminals her mother imprisoned have escaped to Earth, including her aunt Astra and her uncle Non. Kara works with her adoptive sister Alex Danvers, the Green Martian J'onn J'onzz, James Olsen, and tech genius Winn Schott to fight these threats.

Season 2

In Season 2, Kara and her allies face tensions between humans and extraterrestrials while investigating Project Cadmus, run by Lillian Luthor, Lex Luthor's mother. Kara befriends Lena Luthor, Lillian's adoptive daughter, and navigates her romantic feelings for Mon-El, a prince from Daxam, Krypton's neighboring planet. Meanwhile, James becomes the vigilante Guardian, Alex begins dating Maggie Sawyer, and J'onn forms a bond with M'gann M'orzz, a White Martian.

Season 3

In Season 3, Kara grapples with Mon-El's departure, only for him to return from the 31st century, where he has founded the Legion and married Imra Ardeen. J'onn reunites with his father, M'yrnn J'onzz, and Kara's new friend, Samantha Arias, unknowingly transforms into the world-killing weapon Reign.

Season 4

In Season 4, Kara confronts rising anti-alien sentiments fueled by Lex Luthor, who manipulates Ben Lockwood into forming a human-first group, the Children of Liberty, forcing her to fight against prejudice and for the civil and political rights of aliens. Meanwhile, a Kara clone, dubbed Red Daughter, trains in Kasnia to fight Supergirl at Lex's request. Tensions arise as Col. Lauren Haley joins the DEO, demanding that Supergirl reveal her identity, which she refuses to do.

Season 5

In Season 5, Kara and her friends face a new threat, Leviathan, while adjusting to life on the newly created Earth-Prime following the multiverse-altering Crisis on Infinite Earths. Kara also faces challenges working under Lex Luthor, as Leviathan continues their covert operations.

Season 6

In Season 6, the final season, Lex seeks to continue the Anti-Monitor's work by conquering the multiverse and imprisons Kara in the Phantom Zone, where she discovers her father is also trapped. After being rescued, Kara and her team face the fifth-dimensional imp Nyxlygsptlnz, who escaped the Phantom Zone and seeks revenge on her father. Lex eventually allies with Nyxlygsptlnz, leading to the final showdown in the series.

== Cast and characters ==
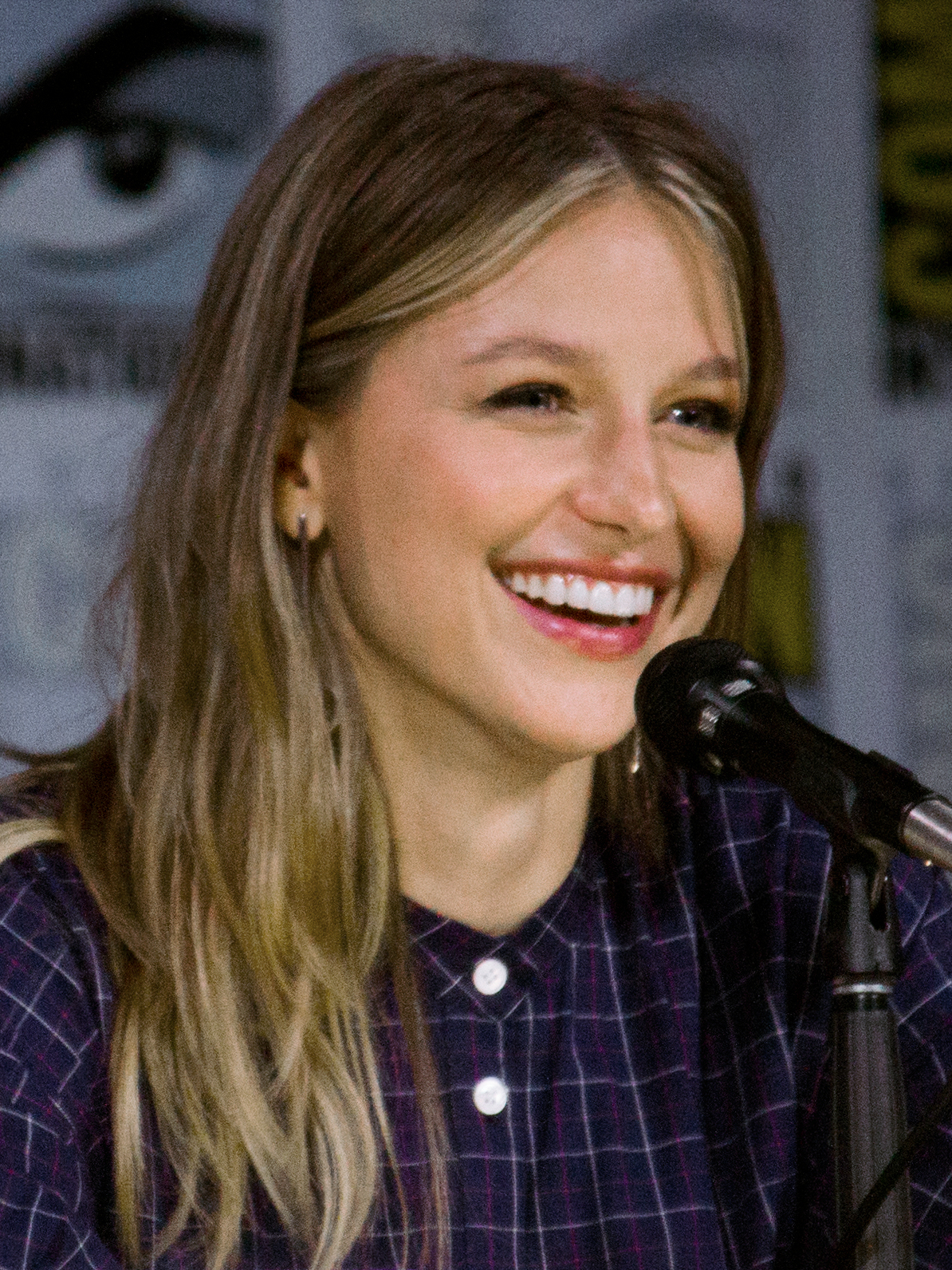
Melissa Benoist stars as the series' titular character, Supergirl.

- Melissa Benoist as Kara Zor-El / Kara Danvers / Supergirl: A Kryptonian living in National City, who must embrace her powers after previously hiding them. She assists her adoptive sister Alex as part of the Department of Extra-Normal Operations (DEO) as she discovered the truth that her adoptive father also worked for the DEO so they would not take her, while Alex's co-workers at the DEO help her perfect her powers. Kara worked as Cat Grant's assistant at CatCo. Benoist expressed her excitement over portraying the character, and being able to "[tell] a story about a human being really realizing their potential and their strength". Malina Weissman (seasons 1-2) and Izabela Vidovic (seasons 3-4 & 6) portray a young Kara.
- Mehcad Brooks as James "Jimmy" Olsen / Guardian (seasons 1–5; guest: season 6): A former Daily Planet photographer, James moved to National City and became the new art director for his former colleague, Cat Grant, at CatCo Worldwide Media. He is initially a potential love interest for Kara. Among his reasons for moving across the country are his breakup with his fiancée, Lucy Lane, and keeping an eye on the newly revealed Supergirl for Superman. While working at the Daily Planet, James received the Pulitzer Prize for taking the first photograph of Superman. In the second season, James becomes Guardian. In the fourth episode of season 5, James decides to leave National City to run his hometown newspaper. He returns in the series finale to assist the Superfriends in the final battle against Lex and Nyxly and attend Alex and Kelly's wedding.
- Chyler Leigh as Alexandra "Alex" Danvers / Sentinel: Kara's human adoptive sister. She is a physician, bioengineer, scientist and government agent who serves as Hank Henshaw's right hand at the DEO. She also meets and befriends police detective Maggie Sawyer and begins to develop feelings for her, forcing Alex to confront her sexuality. Jordan Mazarati and Olivia Nikkanen portray a young Alex.
- Jeremy Jordan as Winslow "Winn" Schott Jr. / Toyman (seasons 1–3; guest: seasons 5–6): A tech expert who worked alongside Kara at CatCo, he is Kara's best friend and serves as one of her allies, helping her develop her costume and aiding her in her adventures. Winn has unrequited feelings for Kara and is a rival with James for her affection.
- David Harewood as J'onn J'onzz / Martian Manhunter: The head of the DEO who takes Hank Henshaw's likeness after Henshaw is killed in Peru while hunting J'onn. J'onn takes Henshaw's likeness to reform the DEO from within as well as to watch over Alex and Kara. The evolution of Henshaw was discussed during the filming of the pilot, with the executive producers jokingly saying that Harewood would be a good actor to play the Martian Manhunter in a potential television series, to which DC Comics' Geoff Johns asked why it could not be done in Supergirl. Harewood reflected that he had difficulty "find[ing] an angle to play Hank Henshaw" in the pilot, and became excited when he was told about the change to his character's backstory. Harewood also recurred in the series as the real Hank Henshaw, who became Cyborg Superman.
- Calista Flockhart as Catherine J. "Cat" Grant (season 1; guest: seasons 2–3 & 6): The outwardly shallow and superficial, but inwardly sweet, founder of the media conglomerate CatCo Worldwide Media, who feels, since she "branded" Kara as "Supergirl", that she has proprietary custody over the new hero.
- Chris Wood as Mon-El / Mike Matthews (seasons 2–3; guest: seasons 5–6): A prince from the planet Daxam with similar powers to Superman and Supergirl, Mon-El lands on Earth in the pod at the end of season one.
- Floriana Lima as Margarita "Maggie" Sawyer (season 2; recurring: season 3): A detective for the National City Police Department who takes a special interest in the cases involving aliens and metahumans. The first openly gay character introduced, Maggie dates Alex Danvers, even becoming engaged. However, this is broken off. Lima became a recurring actress for the third season, departing in the season's fifth episode. Lima noted the role was only intended to last for one season.
- Katie McGrath as Lena Kieran Luthor (seasons 3–6; recurring: season 2): The CEO of L-Corp (formerly known as Luthor Corp) and the younger paternal half-sister of Lex Luthor. Camille Marty portrays a young Lena.
- Odette Annable as Samantha "Sam" Arias / Reign (season 3; guest: season 5): Another Kryptonian sent to Earth as an infant and single mother to her daughter Ruby. Samantha's villainous alternate personality, Reign, emerges in the middle of season 3, but she is unaware of it and her alter ego's actions.
- Jesse Rath as Querl "Brainy" Dox / Brainiac 5 (seasons 4–6; recurring: season 3):
  A half-A.I., half-organic 12th-level intellect from the planet Colu and a member of the Legion of Super-Heroes in the 31st century.
- Sam Witwer as Benjamin Lockwood / Agent Liberty (season 4; guest: season 5): The brilliant, ruthless, and terrifying founder and figurehead of Children of Liberty, a human-supremacist hate group that supports a human-first world order.
- Nicole Maines as Nia Nal / Dreamer (seasons 4–6):
  A soulful young transgender woman with a fierce drive to protect others and the newest addition to the CatCo reporting team. The character is the first transgender superhero on television.
- April Parker Jones as Colonel Lauren Haley (season 4): A hardline career military woman who lives and dies by the orders of her commanding officers. Dedicated to her country, she always acts in its best interest — even if it's not her own.
- Azie Tesfai as Kelly Olsen (seasons 5–6; recurring: season 4): James's younger, no-nonsense sister, recently returned to the United States following a military tour overseas.
- Andrea Brooks as Eve Teschmacher (season 5; recurring: seasons 2–4; guest: season 6): A former CatCo assistant who became part of Lena's research team at L-Corp before being revealed as a dastardly turncoat spy working for Lex Luthor.
- Julie Gonzalo as Andrea Rojas / Acrata (seasons 5–6): A CEO of Obsidian Tech who is the new editor-in-chief of Catco Worldwide Media and an old friend of Lena Luthor.
- Staz Nair as William Dey (seasons 5–6): A new star reporter at Catco Worldwide Media who is secretly remains under the London Times newspapers' employ and undercover to investigates Andrea Rojas, suspecting that she is a criminal.
- LaMonica Garrett as Mar Novu / Monitor (season 5; guest: season 4): A multiversal being testing different Earths in the multiverse in preparation for an impending "crisis", providing the Book of Destiny to John Deegan, releasing J'onn J'onzz's brother, and retrieving the corpse of Lex Luthor. He made his first appearance in the Arrowverse crossover "Elseworlds".
  - Garrett also portrays Mobius / Anti-Monitor, the Monitor's polar opposite, an evil being dedicated to ending the multiverse.
- Peta Sergeant as Nyxlygsptlnz "Nyxly" (season 6): A 5th Dimension Imp princess who Kara meets in the Phantom Zone, who desires revenge on her father for banishing her and killing her brother, and is willing to do whatever is necessary to get it.

== Production ==
=== Development ===
In September 2014, Warner Bros. Television initiated development on a Supergirl television series, with Greg Berlanti, Ali Adler, and Sarah Schechter serving as executive producers under Berlanti Productions. DC Comics' Geoff Johns was also attached to the project. Early working titles included Super and Girl.

Berlanti cited inspiration from actress Ginger Rogers for the character's portrayal, a concept that resonated with executive producer Schechter.

On September 20, 2014, CBS committed to the series, planning a premiere for the 2015–16 television schedule. In January 2015, CBS Entertainment chairwoman Nina Tassler described the series as a procedural drama blending serialized arcs with crime-solving elements.

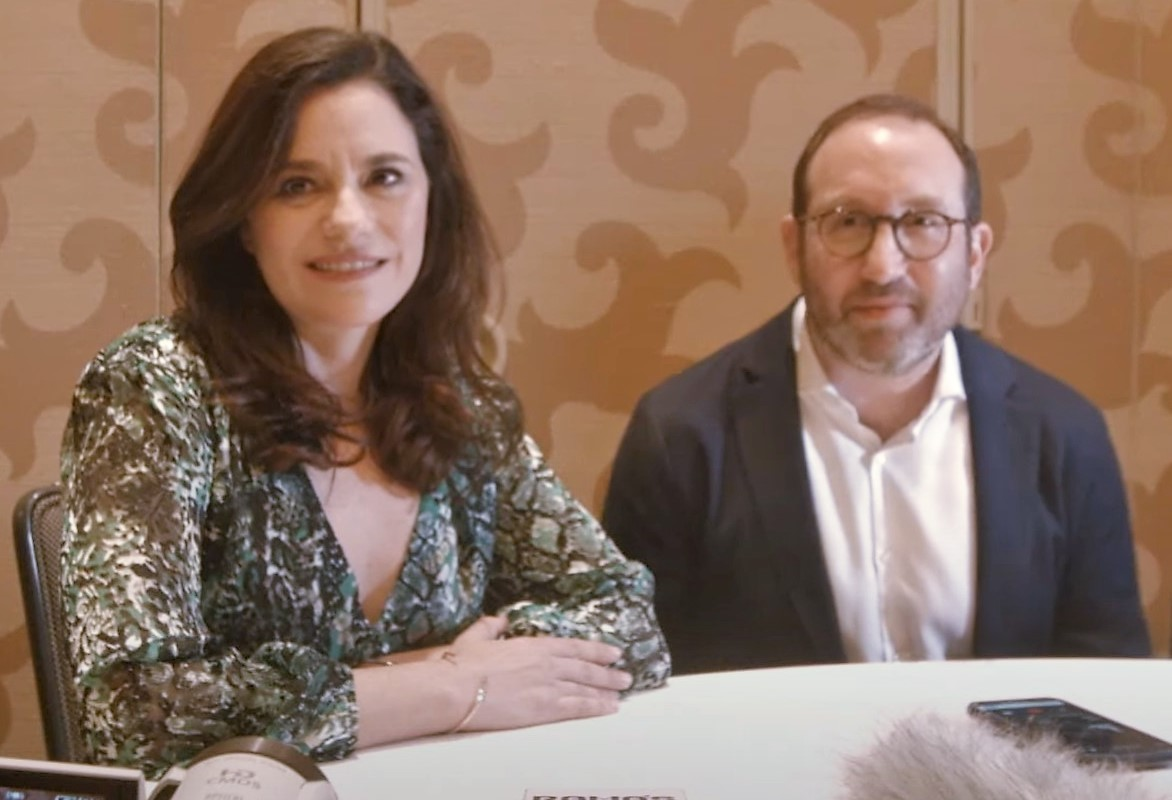
Jessica Queller and Robert Rovner at the Supergirl Roundtable at the 2019 San Diego Comic-Con

Melissa Benoist was cast as Supergirl in January 2015 after an extensive audition process, with other actresses considered including Claire Holt and Gemma Atkinson.

Blake Neely, known for his work on Arrow and The Flash, was confirmed as the series' composer in March 2015.

The show was officially picked up to series on May 6, 2015, and the pilot premiered at San Diego Comic-Con in July 2015.

Adler noted that Superman's role would be minimal to maintain focus on Supergirl. In November 2015, CBS ordered seven more episodes, bringing the total for Season 1 to 20.

On May 12, 2016, it was announced that the series would move to The CW for Season 2, premiering in October 2016.

Concerns were raised about Calista Flockhart's availability, as her contract required filming in Los Angeles; she eventually returned in a recurring capacity.

The series was renewed for Season 3 in January 2017, with Jessica Queller and Robert Rovner taking over as co-showrunners.

Supergirl was renewed for a fourth season, which premiered October 14, 2018, followed by a fifth season in October 2019.

On January 7, 2020, the series was renewed for a sixth season, which premiered on March 30, 2021.

On September 22, 2020, it was announced the series would conclude after season six, ending in November 2021.

=== Design ===
Supergirl's design was intended to be a modern take on the classic look of the character.

The original Supergirl costume was designed by Colleen Atwood, who previously worked on Arrow and The Flash. Atwood aimed to "embrace the past" while modernizing the look.

Melissa Benoist noted the costume’s short skirt as daunting but accepted it as part of the challenge.

The design featured a high-neck top, pleated skirt, tights, and boots, with practical elements like a cape fastened to an undersuit and Eurojersey fabric.

Reception was mixed. Natalie Abrams of Entertainment Weekly praised the modern update and the more covered look, while Screen Rant’s Andrew Dyce applauded the nostalgic elements.

Conversely, E! Online and TV Guide criticized the outfit for its colors and resemblance to a Halloween costume.

In the fifth season, Supergirl’s costume was redesigned to feature pants, a practical departure from the skirt.

=== Filming ===
Andrew Kreisberg joined the series as writer and executive producer in February 2015. Glen Winter was named pilot director.

Principal photography for the pilot occurred from March 4–29, 2015, on the Warner Bros. lot in Burbank, California—previously used for Lois & Clark: The New Adventures of Superman.

The show had an estimated production cost of $3 million per episode, among the highest for a freshman series.

In Season 2, production moved to Vancouver to cut costs, with filming beginning July 25, 2016, and ending April 26, 2017.

"When I was a child, my planet, Krypton, was dying. I was sent to Earth to protect my cousin. But my pod got knocked off-course, and by the time I got here, my cousin had already grown up to become... Superman. And so, I hid my powers, until recently when an accident forced me to reveal myself to the world. To most people, I am an assistant at CatCo Worldwide Media. But in secret, I work with my adoptive sister for the D.E.O. to protect my city from alien life and anyone else that means to cause harm. I am Supergirl!"

— Opening monologue from the first season.

Vancouver remained the filming base through the final season, with scenes shot throughout the city to depict National City.

On March 12, 2020, production was suspended due to the COVID-19 pandemic.

Filming for the sixth season was delayed due to issues receiving COVID-19 test results, ultimately beginning later in fall 2020.

== Broadcast ==
In Canada, Supergirl aired in a sim-subbed simulcast on Global alongside the American broadcast during the first season. For the second season, the series moved to Showcase under the same arrangement.

In the United Kingdom, Supergirl premiered on Sky One on October 29, 2015.

In Australia, Supergirl premiered on FOX8 on December 6, 2015.

== Reception ==
=== Critical response ===
Critical response of Supergirl
Season	Rotten Tomatoes	Metacritic
1	92% (72 reviews)	75% (38 reviews)
2	92% (20 reviews)	81% (4 reviews)
3	78% (15 reviews)	—N/a
4	87% (7 reviews)	—N/a
5	92% (8 reviews)	—N/a
6	88% (13 reviews)	—N/a

Review aggregation website Rotten Tomatoes gave the first season of Supergirl a 92% approval rating from critics, with an average rating of 7.53/10, based on 72 reviews. The site's consensus states: "Melissa Benoist shines as Superman's plucky little cousin in Supergirl, a family-friendly comic-book adaptation that ditches cynicism for heart." Metacritic, which uses a weighted average, reported "generally favorable reviews" with an assigned score of 75 out of 100, based on reviews from 38 critics. Cliff Wheatley of IGN gave the pilot episode a 7/10, praising Benoist's performance as Kara and the fun take on the Superman mythos.

Rotten Tomatoes gave the second season a 92% approval rating from critics with an average rating of 7.88/10, based on 20 reviews. The site's consensus reads: "The arrival of the more famous cousin in Supergirl does nothing to detract from the show's lead, who continues to deliver strength, action, and relatability." Metacritic reported "universal acclaim" with an assigned score of 81 out of 100, based on reviews from 4 critics.

The third season holds a 78% approval rating on Rotten Tomatoes based on 15 reviews, with an average rating of 6.9/10. The critical consensus states: "Heavier themes lead to higher stakes, but Supergirl gives its eponymous heroine and her fellow supers plenty of room for growth, creating a well-balanced, engaging third season."

The fourth season reports an 87% approval rating, with an average rating of 7.27/10 based on 7 reviews. The website's critic consensus reads: "Though it's a little tonally inconsistent, Supergirl's fourth season still soars thanks to strong, relevant writing brought to life by its charming cast." The book Adapting Superman: Essays on the Transmedia Man of Steel includes a chapter titled "Forging Kryptonite: Lex Luthor's Xenophobia as Societal Fracturing, from Batman v Superman to Supergirl," which analyzes Lex Luthor's actions in Season 4 as "a representation exploring the cultural effects of encroaching xenophobia" from society to the family, reflecting the years following the 2016 United States presidential election. In addition to making parallels of the political climate, Phil Baker bears a similar likeness of Donald Trump, who was the 45th President of the United States at the time of season 4's airing, and even quotes him a few times.

Review aggregation website Rotten Tomatoes gave the fifth season of Supergirl an 92% approval rating from critics, with an average rating of 7.0/10, based on 8 reviews. The site's consensus states: "While Supergirl’s fifth season suffers from too many plot threads, it still delivers the heart, action, and timely storytelling fans expect from the series."

For the sixth and final season, Rotten Tomatoes reported an 88% approval rating, with an average rating of 6.8/10, based on 6 reviews. The consensus reads: "In its final stretch, Supergirl struggles to juggle its many characters and subplots, but it still manages to close the story with an emotional and satisfying conclusion, led by Benoist's strong performance."

=== Ratings ===
Viewership and ratings per season of Supergirl
Season	Timeslot (ET)	Network	Episodes	First aired		Last aired		TV season	Viewership rank	Avg. viewers (millions)	18–49 rank	Avg. 18–49 rating
Season	Timeslot (ET)	Network	Episodes	Date	Viewers (millions)	Date	Viewers (millions)	TV season	Viewership rank	Avg. viewers (millions)	18–49 rank	Avg. 18–49 rating
1	Monday 8:00 pm	CBS	20	October 26, 2015	12.96	April 18, 2016	6.11	2015–16	39	9.81	27	2.4
2	Monday 8:00 pm	The CW	22	October 10, 2016	3.06	May 22, 2017	2.12	2016–17	129	3.12	115	1.0
3	Monday 8:00 pm	The CW	23	October 9, 2017	1.87	June 18, 2018	1.78	2017–18	154	2.82	120	0.9
4	Sunday 8:00 pm	The CW	22	October 14, 2018	1.52	May 19, 2019	1.07	2018–19	169	1.67	147	0.5
5	Sunday 9:00 pm	The CW	19	October 6, 2019	1.26	May 17, 2020	0.65	2019–20	118	1.58	113	0.5
6	Tuesday 9:00 pm	The CW	20	March 30, 2021	0.73	November 9, 2021	0.49	2020–21	140	1.17	133	0.3

=== Accolades ===
Awards and nominations received by Supergirl
Year	Award	Category	Nominee(s)	Result	Ref.
2015	Critics' Choice Television Awards	Most Exciting New Series	Supergirl	Won	
2016	People's Choice Awards	Favorite New TV Drama	Supergirl	Won	
2016	Saturn Awards	Best Actress on Television	Melissa Benoist	Nominated	
2016	Saturn Awards	Best Guest Starring Role on Television	Laura Benanti	Nominated	
2016	Saturn Awards	Best Superhero Adaptation Television Series	Supergirl	Nominated	
2016	Saturn Awards	Best Supporting Actress on Television	Calista Flockhart	Nominated	
2016	Saturn Awards	Breakthrough Performance	Melissa Benoist	Won	
2016	Teen Choice Awards	Breakout Series	Supergirl	Nominated	
2017	GLAAD Media Awards	Outstanding Drama Series	Supergirl	Nominated	
2017	Kids' Choice Awards	Favorite TV Show – Family Show	Supergirl	Nominated	
2017	Saturn Awards	Best Actress on a Television Series	Melissa Benoist	Won	
2017	Saturn Awards	Best Guest Performance on a Television Series	Tyler Hoechlin	Nominated	
2017	Saturn Awards	Best Superhero Adaptation Television Series	Supergirl	Won	
2017	Saturn Awards	Best Supporting Actor on a Television Series	Mehcad Brooks	Nominated	
2017	Teen Choice Awards	Choice Action TV Actor	Chris Wood	Nominated	
2017	Teen Choice Awards	Choice Action TV Actress	Melissa Benoist	Won	
2017	Teen Choice Awards	Choice Action TV Show	Supergirl	Nominated	
2017	Teen Choice Awards	Choice Liplock	Melissa Benoist and Chris Wood	Nominated	
2017	Teen Choice Awards	Choice TV Ship	Melissa Benoist and Chris Wood	Nominated	
2017	Teen Choice Awards	Choice TV Villain	Teri Hatcher	Nominated	
2018	People's Choice Awards	The Sci-Fi/Fantasy Show of 2018	Supergirl	Nominated	
2018	Saturn Awards	Best Actress on a Television Series	Melissa Benoist	Nominated	
2018	Saturn Awards	Best Superhero Adaptation Television Series	Supergirl	Nominated	
2018	Saturn Awards	Best Supporting Actress on Television	Odette Annable	Nominated	
2018	Teen Choice Awards	Choice Action TV Actor	Chris Wood	Nominated	
2018	Teen Choice Awards	Choice Action TV Actress	Melissa Benoist	Won	
2018	Teen Choice Awards	Choice Action TV Show	Supergirl	Nominated	
2018	Teen Choice Awards	Choice Scene Stealer	Katie McGrath	Nominated	
2018	Teen Choice Awards	Choice TV Villain	Odette Annable	Nominated	
2019	GLAAD Media Awards	Outstanding Drama Series	Supergirl	Nominated	
2019	Saturn Awards	Best Superhero Television Series	Supergirl	Won	
2019	Saturn Awards	Best Actress on Television	Melissa Benoist	Nominated	
2019	Saturn Awards	Best Supporting Actor on Television	David Harewood	Nominated	
2019	Saturn Awards	Best Guest Starring Role on Television	Jon Cryer	Nominated	
2019	Teen Choice Awards	Choice Action TV Actress	Melissa Benoist	Nominated	
2019	Teen Choice Awards	Choice Action TV Show	Supergirl	Nominated	
2019	Teen Choice Awards	Choice TV Villain	Jon Cryer	Nominated	
2020	GLAAD Media Awards	Outstanding Drama Series	Supergirl	Nominated	
2020	People's Choice Awards	The Sci-Fi/Fantasy Show of 2020	Supergirl	Nominated	
2021	Critics' Choice Super Awards	Best Actor in a Superhero Series	Jon Cryer	Nominated	
2021	Critics' Choice Super Awards	Best Actress in a Superhero Series	Melissa Benoist	Nominated	
2021	GLAAD Media Awards	Outstanding Drama Series	Supergirl	Nominated	
2021	Saturn Awards	Best Superhero Adaptation Television Series	Supergirl	Nominated	
2021	Saturn Awards	Best Actress on Television	Melissa Benoist	Nominated	
2021	Saturn Awards	Best Guest Performance on a Television Series	Jon Cryer	Won	
2022	GLAAD Media Awards	Outstanding Drama Series	Supergirl	Nominated	
2022	Saturn Awards	Best Network or Cable Science Fiction Television Series	Supergirl	Nominated	

==== Critics' top ten lists ====
2015 critics' top ten lists

- No. 10 People
- Unranked – Variety
- No. 7 The Washington Post

2016 critics' top ten lists

- No. 5 Cinema Blend

== Arrowverse ==
In November 2014, Berlanti expressed interest in Supergirl existing in the Arrowverse, the same universe as his other series Arrow and The Flash, and in January 2015, The CW president Mark Pedowitz revealed that he was also open to a crossover between the series and networks (due to Berlanti executive producing all three and The CW being co-owned by CBS). However, CBS Entertainment chair Nina Tassler stated that month that "those two shows are on a different network. So I think we'll keep Supergirl to ourselves for a while." In August 2015, Tassler revealed that while there were no plans at the time to do crossover storylines, the three series would have crossover promotions.

Pedowitz regretted passing on the series when presented it in mid-2014, saying, "We hadn't launched The Flash yet, we weren't ready to take on another DC property. In hindsight we probably should've gone that direction...Sometimes you lose great shows." In January 2016, during the Television Critics Association press tour, he said that The CW was still interested in a crossover with Supergirl if the producers could find a way to do it, and Berlanti added that while no official conversations had taken place, internal ones had concerning how a crossover would work. He also noted that for a crossover to happen during Supergirl's first season, it would have to be figured out "in the next month or so". Glenn Geller, Tassler's successor at CBS, then stated on the matter, "I have to be really careful what I say here. Watch and wait and see what happens."

On February 3, 2016, it was announced that Grant Gustin, who appears as Barry Allen / Flash on The Flash, would appear in the eighteenth episode of the first season, "Worlds Finest". While no plot details on the episodes were released at the time, Ross A. Lincoln of Deadline Hollywood noted that "the in-universe reason" for the crossover was due to Barry's ability to travel to various dimensions, thus implying that Supergirl exists on an alternate Earth to Arrow and The Flash in a multiverse. The Flash episode "Welcome to Earth-2" confirmed this, showing an image of Benoist as Supergirl during a sequence where characters travel through that multiverse. The earth that the series inhabits is Earth-38 in the Arrowverse multiverse, and has been informally referred to as "Earth-CBS" by Marc Guggenheim, one of the creators of Arrow.

During the second season, Supergirl appears in "Invasion!", a crossover episode of The Flash, Arrow and Legends of Tomorrow, when she's recruited by Barry Allen and Cisco Ramon at the end of "Medusa" to help fight off an invasion by the Dominators. Supergirl and The Flash also featured in a musical crossover, featuring several covers of existing songs along with two original numbers. Similar to "Invasion!", the crossover begins at the end of the Supergirl episode "Star-Crossed" and primarily takes place during The Flash episode "Duet", featuring the Music Meister as the antagonist who puts both The Flash and Supergirl in a shared hallucination. After "Invasion!", Guggenheim felt "If there's an appetite for it from the fans and from the network," the crossover next year could be "a proper four-part crossover."

At the 2017 Paleyfest event, Kreisberg reiterated the creative team's intention to do a full four-way crossover the following year. At San Diego Comic Con in 2017, it was confirmed that another four-way crossover would take place, with Supergirl playing a larger role than the previous season. The four-way crossover event, titled "Crisis on Earth-X", took place on November 27 and 28, 2017, across Supergirl and Arrow (on the first night) and The Flash and Legends of Tomorrow (on the second night).

In May 2018, Arrow star Stephen Amell announced at The CW upfronts that the next Arrowverse crossover would feature Batwoman and Gotham City. The crossover, titled "Elseworlds", aired in December 2018, ahead of a potential 2019 solo series for the character. Supergirl was confirmed to have a participating episode in August, which closed out the three-part crossover, trading nights with The Flash just for the event. Therefore, the show's participating episode aired on Tuesday, December 11. The end of "Elseworlds" teased the next crossover event, "Crisis on Infinite Earths". Supergirl's episode opened the five-part crossover on December 8, 2019, with the final two installments airing on January 14, 2020. At the end of the event, the new Earth-Prime was formed, which saw Earth-38 merged with the former Earth-1 and Black Lightning's earth, creating a fictional universe where all of the CW series exist together.

=== Standalone spin-off ===
In October 2019, The CW and Warner Bros. Television announced development on a spin-off series titled Superman & Lois, with Tyler Hoechlin and Elizabeth Tulloch reprising their roles as Clark Kent / Superman and Lois Lane. In January 2020, Superman & Lois was ordered to series. The series premiered on February 23, 2021. Originally presented as being set in the same continuity as Supergirl, the series was retroactively established to be set in an adjacent universe to the Arrowverse in its second season finale.

== Other media ==
=== Comic books ===
In July 2015, a four-page preview comic entitled Sister Act, written by Ali Adler, Greg Berlanti and Andrew Kreisberg was released digitally online, and then a day later in the September 2015 issue of TV Guide.

Adventures of Supergirl: Beginning in January 2016, DC Comics launched a 13-issue bi-weekly digital comic (6 in print). Written by Sterling Gates and drawn by a rotating team of artist including Bengal, Jonboy Meyers, Emanuela Lupacchino, and Emma Vieceli, the comic, while not directly tying into the show, tells stories set in the universe of the show. The digital series was collected in print as a six-issue series published twice a month from May to July 2016, and as a complete graphic novel in September of that year.

They are also involved in the Earth-Prime miniseries launched in April 2022.

- Adventures of Supergirl (2016-09-21): Includes Adventures of Supergirl #1-6.

=== Novels ===
In November 2017, Abrams Books began publishing a new trilogy of Supergirl novels, written by Jo Whittemore, aimed at middle-grade readers in tandem with a similar trilogy of The Flash novels. The first, Supergirl: Age of Atlantis, was released on November 7, 2017, and features Supergirl dealing with a surge of new powered people in National City, as well as a mysterious humanoid sea creature captured by the DEO who is seemingly attracted by the new superpowered people. A sequel, Supergirl: Curse of the Ancients, was released on May 1, 2018, with a third novel, titled Supergirl: Master of Illusion, released on January 8, 2019.

=== Guidebook ===
A guidebook for the series, published by Abrams, was released on March 12, 2019. Supergirl: The Secret Files of Kara Danvers: The Ultimate Guide to the Hit TV Show features "detailed profiles on characters and super powers, a heroes and villains gallery, episode guide, and more" from the first three seasons of the series.

=== Video games ===
The video game Lego DC Super-Villains features DLC inspired by Supergirl in the "DC Super Heroes: TV Series DLC Character Pack". The DLC pack includes Supergirl as a playable character.

== Home media ==
Home media releases for Supergirl
Complete season	DVD release dates			Blu-ray release dates	
Complete season	Region 1	Region 2	Region 4	Region A	Region B
1	August 9, 2016	July 25, 2016	July 27, 2016	August 9, 2016	July 25, 2016
2	August 22, 2017	August 21, 2017	August 23, 2017	August 22, 2017	August 21, 2017
3	September 18, 2018	September 17, 2018	September 19, 2018	September 18, 2018	September 17, 2018
4	September 17, 2019	September 23, 2019		September 23, 2019	September 23, 2019
5	September 8, 2020		September 8, 2020		
