= Azie Tesfai =

American actress and writer

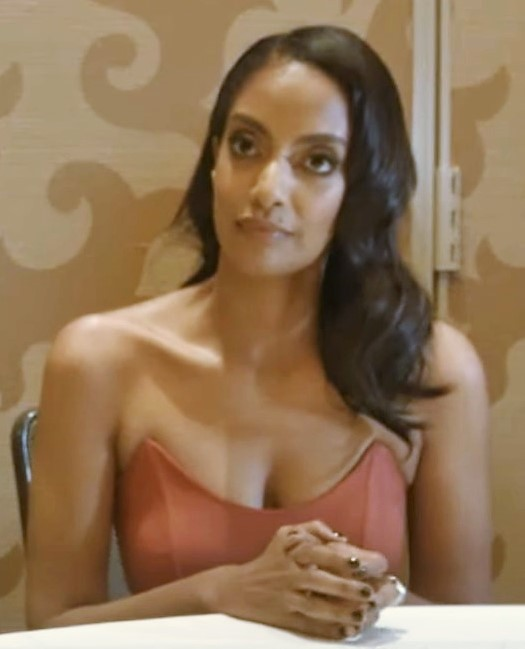
- Tesfai at the 2019 San Diego Comic Con Supergirl Roundtable
- Born: Azalech Tesfai; Los Angeles, California
- Occupations: Actor, Writer, Producer
- Years active: 2006–present
- Known for: Supergirl; Jane the Virgin

Azie Tesfai is an American actress, writer, and producer. She is known for her television roles, including Jane the Virgin and Supergirl.

== Early life and education ==
Azalech (Azie) Tesfai was raised in Los Angeles, California, the daughter of Eritrean immigrants who grew up in Ethiopia. She is an only child. Tesfai received a degree in business administration from UC Berkeley.. While at Berkeley, she began attending auditions and acting classes.

== Career ==
Tesfai's first role was Cherry Milton in Wicked Wicked Games on MyNetworkTV, where she appeared in 30 episodes over two seasons. She has appeared in Melrose Place, Law & Order: SVU, Franklin & Bash and Royal Pains. In 2014 she was cast as recurring detective Nadine Hanson in the CW's Jane the Virgin. She appeared in season 3 of Silicon Valley in 2016.

She was cast as Kelly Olsen, the sister of DC Comics character James Olsen (Mehcad Brooks), on the fourth season of The CW series Supergirl. Prior to her debut appearance in the fourth season, it was announced that Tesfai would be promoted to series regular for the fifth season. She co-wrote episode 12 of the sixth and final season ("Blind Spots"), making her the first Arrowverse actor to receive a writing credit on an Arrowverse series. Through her focus on writing and producing, Tesfai currently has two series in development: The Chase, which landed with Universal Television for NBC, and Sheba, a drama series about the first queen on the continent of Africa, which landed at Onyx Collective for Hulu with Ryan Coogler's Proximity Media producing.

== Fortuned Culture ==
Tesfai founded jewelry company Fortuned Culture in Los Angeles. Proceeds from sales help children in developing countries like Mexico, Ethiopia and Cambodia.

== Filmography ==
Year	Title	Role	Notes
2006–2007	Wicked Wicked Games	Cherry Milton	Main (30 episodes)
2007	Sands of Oblivion	Jamie	(TV Movie)
2008	The Cleaner	Ananda	Guest (1 episode)
2009	Rosencrantz and Guildenstern Are Undead	Zadeska	(Movie)
2009	Sutures	Kristen	(Movie)
2009–2010	Melrose Place	Nurse Mandy	Guest (3 episodes)
2010	Acts of Violence	Betsy	(Movie)
2010	15 Minutes	Arora	(TV Movie)
2010	Nathan vs. Nurture	Julie	(TV Movie)
2011	Two for Hollywood	Vicky	(Short)
2011	Law & Order: Special Victims Unit	Kendra	Guest (1 episode)
2012	Harry's Law	Debbie	Guest (1 episode)
2012	This American Housewife	Nellie Swift	Guest (1 episode)
2012	Breakout Kings	Chelsea	Guest (2 episodes)
2014	Franklin & Bash	Meg	Guest (4 episodes)
2014	Backlash	Michelle	(Short)
2014–2016	Jane the Virgin	Nadine Hanson	Recurring (21 episodes, Seasons 1–2)
2015	Me Him Her	Kempy Blook	(Movie)
2015	A Kind of Magic	Lacy	(Movie)
2015	Home & Family	Unknown	Guest (1 episode)
2015	Royal Pains	Aubrey Wolfhouse	Guest (1 episode)
2016	Silicon Valley	Dawn Simon	Guest (1 episode)
2016	Powers	Dr. Michelle Marrs	Recurring (2 episodes)
2016	Rosewood	Lil Kim	Guest (1 episode)
2016	Superstore	Naomi	Guest (1 episode)
2017	Knock Knock Head Lock	Misty Copeland	(Short)
2017	The Real O'Neals	Heather	Guest (1 episode)
2017	Ghosted	Kirsten	Guest (1 episode)
2017–2018	NCIS: Los Angeles	Dana King	Guest (2 episodes)
2018	The Kominsky Method	Lynda	Guest (2 episodes)
2019–2021	Supergirl	Kelly Olsen / Guardian	Recurring role (season 4), main cast (season 5–6); 46 episodes
2020	The Wretched	Sara	Movie
2021	A Million Little Things	Cassandra Thomas	Recurring Role (3 episodes)
