= Kara Danvers =

Fictional character in the Arrowverse franchise

- Arrowverse character
- Melissa Benoist as Kara Danvers/Kara Zor-El in a promotional image from season one of the television series Supergirl
- First appearance: "Pilot"; Supergirl; October 26, 2015
- Last appearance: "Kara"; Supergirl; November 9, 2021
- Based on: Supergirl (Kara Zor-El) by: Otto Binder; Al Plastino
- Adapted by: Greg Berlanti; Ali Adler; Andrew Kreisberg
- Portrayed by: Melissa Benoist (adult); Malina Weissman (young; 2003); Izabela Vidovic (young; 2007 and 2009)

In-universe information
- Full name: Kara Zor-El
- Species: Kryptonian
- Gender: Female
- Title: Supergirl
- Affiliation: Department of Extranormal Operations (DEO); CatCo Worldwide Media; Superfriends; Paragons; Justice League
- Relatives: Zor-El (father); Alura Zor-El (mother); Jor-El (paternal uncle, deceased); Lara Lor-Van (paternal aunt, deceased); Clark Kent (cousin); Non (maternal uncle, deceased); Astra In-Ze (maternal aunt, deceased); Jeremiah Danvers (adoptive father, deceased); Eliza Danvers (adoptive mother); Alex Danvers (adoptive sister)
- Origin: Krypton

Kara Danvers, also known as Kara Zor-El on her homeworld, is a fictional character in the Arrowverse franchise, mainly the television series Supergirl. Adapted for television by Greg Berlanti, Ali Adler and Andrew Kreisberg, the character is based on the DC Comics character Kara Zor-El (Supergirl), created by Otto Binder and Al Plastino. Kara is introduced in the pilot episode as the adopted younger sister of Alex Danvers. Kara Danvers is portrayed by Melissa Benoist as an adult, and Malina Weissman and Izabela Vidovic as a teenager. After her planet, Krypton, was destroyed, Kara and her cousin Superman came to Earth. There she became the adopted sister of Alex Danvers and, later, after deciding to use her powers (equal to Superman's) to help others under the persona of Supergirl, she discovers that her sister is part of the Department of Extranormal Operations (DEO), a massive underground anti-alien organization secretly under the control of the Martian Manhunter. She is a friend and frequent ally of the superhero speedster the Flash and vigilante archer Green Arrow.

Kara's powers and abilities include super strength, superspeed, heat vision, freeze breath, flight and many other powers also achievable by the superhero Superman, who is Kara's cousin; however, like her cousin, she is weakened when she comes into contact with Kryptonite, fragments of her home planet Krypton that came to Earth after its destruction. Benoist has reprised her role in other series that take place in the same franchise, including The Flash, Arrow, Legends of Tomorrow and Batwoman, via the crossover events "Invasion!", "Crisis on Earth-X", "Elseworlds" and "Crisis on Infinite Earths". The character's civilian identity, Kara Danvers, is an original creation for the series, and was later integrated into the mainstream DC Comics Supergirl comic book series to tie-in with the series in 2016's DC Rebirth.

== Creation and casting ==
For the role of Kara Zor-El / Supergirl, the producers wanted a Caucasian actress aged between 22 and 26 years. In January 2015, it was announced by The Hollywood Reporter that Melissa Benoist would star as the character. Benoist later revealed that auditioning for the part "was a long, drawn-out, three-month process"; she was the first actress looked at for the role, although Claire Holt and Gemma Atkinson were also considered. Holt and Benoist were final contenders for the part. Actress Elizabeth Lail also auditioned for the role. Other performers include her stunt double Jennifer Clarke, who performed stunts for the Supergirl character throughout the entire show. In flashbacks, Malina Weissman and Izabela Vidovic portray Kara as a teenager and child, respectively. The series reimagines Kara Zor-El as a young adult when becoming a superhero (more similar to Linda Danvers), deviating from her comic book counterpart, more usually depicted as a teenager. Benoist expressed her excitement over portraying the character, and being able to "[tell] a story about a human being really realizing their potential and their strength". Benoist portrays present-day Kara for all six seasons of Supergirl. In addition in the third season, she portrays Earth-X doppelganger Overgirl, and in the fourth season, a clone of Kara called Red Daughter.

== Characterization ==
For the second season, regarding the end of Kara and James Olsen's relationship, Andrew Kreisberg said "We realized that the best scenes between [Kara and James] were just the nice, sweet scenes where they were being friends." He also said that while the theme of the first season was "how does Kara become Supergirl?", the theme of the second would be "how does Supergirl become Kara?". Speaking to the ending of Mon-El and Kara's relationship in season four, Jessica Queller compared this separation to that of Humphrey Bogart and Ingrid Bergman's characters in the ending of Casablanca (1942), saying, "They both have destinies in different times as heroes. What they did was the sort-of Casablanca decision of putting what's most important to them – which is saving the world – first." For season four, Melissa Benoist joined filming following the conclusion of her run on Broadway as the star of Beautiful: The Carole King Musical on August 4, 2018. Also for that season, Melissa Benoist commented that, "I think their main premise is that fear itself is a villain, and can hope conquer it? Supergirl stands for hope, so we'll see." Queller concurred, adding that the season would investigate, "How can [Supergirl] be a beacon of hope when she represents what people are afraid of?"

In season five, the series introduces a new Supergirl suit which eschews the red skirt and sheer black pantyhose seen in the older suit in favor of a bodysuit with trousers. Benoist and the showrunners said giving Supergirl pants was something they discussed since the first season. Querl Dox is credited with creating a new microscopic motion-activator for the new suit that attaches to Kara's glasses and unleashes the suit when she whips off the glasses, resulting in Supergirl being fully dressed in her costume. The seventeenth episode of the fifth season marks Benoist's directorial debut. Benoist said the sixth season serves as a "self-exploration" for her character, "looking in the mirror and [contemplating] what her power means because it's almost limitless and it makes her so strong on Earth".

== Storylines ==
=== Crossovers ===
As of 2021, Benoist has appeared as Kara Danvers in five Arrowverse shows: Supergirl, The Flash, Arrow, Legends of Tomorrow and Batwoman.

In the 2015-16 television season, The Flash accidentally travels into an alternate Earth while testing a new tachyon enhancement device that was meant to power up his speed. He saves Kara from falling from a building. The Flash introduces himself as Barry Allen and explains about the multiverse to Kara and her friends. Before returning home, Barry helps Kara defeat Silver Banshee and Livewire.

In the 2016-17 television season, Barry and his friend Cisco Ramon teleport to Kara's Earth, coined Earth-38 by Cisco, and recruit Kara for an alien invasion led by an extraterrestrial race known as the Dominators on Earth-1. The heroes learn the Dominators plan to kill all metahumans on Earth due to Barry's abilities to alter with the timeline. Barry plans to surrender but the heroes dissuade him from doing so. The heroes discover a bomb from one of the Dominator's ships and destroy it, forcing the Dominators to flee. In March 2017, J'onn J'onzz and Mon-El arrive on Earth-1 with a comatose Kara in hopes that Barry and his team could revive her and warn Barry that one of their escaped prisoners—the Music Meister—is after him as well. When Meister attacks Barry, he is placed in a shared coma with Kara. In the coma, Barry and Kara are forced in a musical which Meister planned so that Barry and Kara can love their personal loved ones. Kara, J'onn, and Kara return to their Earth. Kara then starts a relationship with Mon-El after.

In the 2017-18 television season, Kara and her sister Alex are invited to Barry and Iris' wedding on Earth-1, however, they are invaded by Nazis from Earth-X led by Dark Arrow, Overgirl (Kara's Earth-X doppelgänger) and Eobard Thawne / Reverse-Flash from Earth-1. The invaders capture Kara, who plan to take her heart and give it to Overgirl, who is dying from disproportionate solar irradiance in her heart. Dark Arrow plans to use the Prism, powered by S.T.A.R. Labs' particle accelerator, to create artificial red sunlight that can weaken both Karas' invulnerability, allowing Thawne to transplant Kara's heart to Overgirl. Iris and Felicity rescue Kara and return to Earth-1. Dark Arrow and his team lead a force of Earth-X Nazis to invade Earth-1 but are ultimately defeated with Kara carrying a radioactive Overgirl to space where she explodes and dies. Following Martin Stein's funeral, Kara and Alex return to Earth-38.

In the 2018-2019 television series, Dr. John Deegan is given the Book of Destiny by the Monitor to rewrite reality in his vision. When he swaps the lives of Barry and Oliver, the two discover the change in reality and seek Kara, whose Earth is unaffected by the change, on Earth-38 for help. They later run into the vigilante Batwoman while confronting Deegan in Gotham City. Eventually, Oliver makes a deal with the Monitor to restore reality back to normal.

In the 2019-2020 television series, the multiverse is slowly being erased by the Anti-Monitor. Kara is recruited among other heroes as the chosen Paragons to defeat the Anti-Monitor. When Oliver sacrifices himself to kill the Anti-Monitor, a restored multiverse is put back together combining into one Earth coined "Earth-Prime" including Kara's Earth.

=== Alternate Earths ===
==== Overgirl (Earth-X) ====
During the Crisis on Earth-X crossover event, one of the main antagonists is the Earth-X Nazi doppelganger of Kara known as Overgirl. She served alongside Dark Arrow, who is revealed to be the Earth-X doppelganger of Oliver Queen. Eventually, during a battle with Kara, Overgirl's solar radiation goes nuclear and Kara carries her into space, where her body explodes, killing her.

== Tie-in comics and novels ==
Kara Danvers appears in the show's digital tie-in comic book series, Adventures of Supergirl. in 2017 Kara appeared in a trilogy of novels written by Jo Whittemore aimed at middle-grade readers. The first, Supergirl: Age of Atlantis, was released on November 7, 2017. it features Supergirl dealing with a surge of newly powered people in National City, as well as a mysterious humanoid sea creature captured by the DEO who is seemingly attracted to the new superpowered people. A sequel, Supergirl: Curse of the Ancients was released on May 1, 2018, with the third novel title Supergirl: Master of Illusion, released on January 8, 2019.

== Reception ==
Graeme Virtue of The Guardian praised Supergirl and Melissa Benoist's performance as Kara Danvers. David Sims of The Atlantic reviewed the series positively, saying: "A lot of the credit has to go to the casting of Benoist as Kara—she's as perfect a fit as Grant Gustin was for The Flash." Brian Lowry of Chicago Tribune complimented the casting of the series, stating, "Benoist nails the title role." Evan Valentine of Collider called Benoist's adaptation of the character the "best Supergirl we've seen in live action" because "it managed to capture a sense of fun among the cast that was infectious." Max Nicholson of IGN praised both Benoist's performance and the character, saying, "Melissa Benoist [... ] totally encapsulated the lead role and portrayed both the vulnerability of Kara Danvers and the determination of Kara Zor-El," calling the character "strong, capable, upbeat" despite noting some flaws. In her review for Common Sense Media, Emily Ashby praised Melissa Benoist and praised Kara Danvers for her qualities and values, writing, "Kara has a lot of great qualities that have nothing to do with her superpowers; she's industrious, self-motivated, and empathetic. Even as a hero, she's not out for recognition. She does what she does because it's what she's meant to do. [...] There are strong themes of self-reliance, embracing destiny, and following your own heart's desire, all portrayed by a very likable, fresh-faced heroine." Some critics have stated the series's Kara as not being distinct enough from Superman, simply being a ¨female Clark Kent¨.

The relationship between the Danvers sisters has been among the things praised about the Supergirl character. Kara and Alex were named as one of "The 10 Greatest Ride or Die TV Siblings" by TV Guide's Keisha Hatchett, who stated: "These two might not come from the same species, but their unconditional love for each other proves that you don't need to share the same blood in order to be sisters. Both have helped each other through a difficult journey to self-acceptance [...] in a fierce display of sisterhood that keeps us coming back each week."

== Legacy ==
The identity of Kara Danvers and other aspects from the television series (such as working with the DEO and at Cat Grant's CatCo Worldwide Media) were adapted into the DC continuity during the Rebirth event, in 2016. The miniseries Supergirl: Woman Of Tomorrow reintroduces Kara as a 21-one-year-old, more mature than on previous iterations in the comics and closer to Kara's portrayal on the series, in which she is a young adult rather than a teenager. By the end of Woman of Tomorrow, Kara dons a new costume with pants, more similar to Kara Danvers' second costume from the fifth season.

=== Accolades ===
Year	Award	Category	Nominee(s)	Result	Ref.
2016	Saturn Awards	Best Actress on Television	Melissa Benoist	Nominated	
2016	Saturn Awards	Breakthrough Performance	Melissa Benoist	Won	
2017	Saturn Awards	Best Actress on a Television Series	Melissa Benoist	Won	
2017	Teen Choice Awards	Choice Action TV Actress	Melissa Benoist	Won	
2017	Teen Choice Awards	Choice Liplock	Melissa Benoist and Chris Wood	Nominated	
2017	Teen Choice Awards	Choice TV Ship	Melissa Benoist and Chris Wood	Nominated	
2018	Saturn Awards	Best Actress on a Television Series	Melissa Benoist	Nominated	
2018	Teen Choice Awards	Choice Action TV Actress	Melissa Benoist	Won	
2019	Saturn Awards	Best Actress on Television	Melissa Benoist	Nominated	
2019	Teen Choice Awards	Choice Action TV Actress	Melissa Benoist	Nominated	
2021	Critics' Choice Super Awards	Best Actress in a Superhero Series	Melissa Benoist	Nominated	
