= Robert Rovner =

American television producer and writer

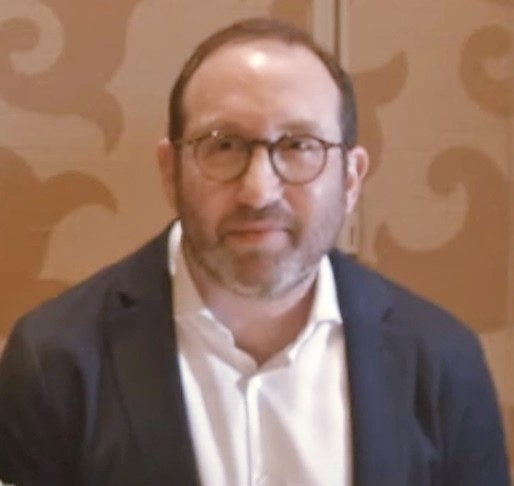
- Rovner at the Supergirl Roundtable at the 2019 San Diego Comic-Con.
- Born: United States
- Occupations: Screenwriter, producer

Robert Rovner is an American television producer and writer, best known for his work on TV shows Crossing Jordan, Private Practice, Dallas, Bionic Woman, Summerland, American Dreams (NBC) and Supergirl.

== Career ==
He served as showrunner/executive producer and writer of Grey's Anatomy's 2007 spin-off series, Private Practice as well as the final season of Crossing Jordan. He was also an executive producer and writer on "Dallas" (TNT). He was also Co-Showrunner/Executive Producer on Supergirl alongside Jessica Queller, after Andrew Kreisberg's firing, for the rest of the series' run.

=== Private Practice ===
Rovner joined the Private Practice writing staff in its second season. He is credited as the writer or co-writer of the following Private Practice episodes:

- "Tempting Faith" (2008)
- "Nothing to Fear" (2009)
- "Ex-Life" (2009)
- "Yours, Mine & Ours" (2009)
- "A Death in the Family" (2009)
- "Shotgun" (2010)

== Personal life ==
He is married to Susan Rosner Rovner, who served as chairman of NBC Entertainment from 2020 to 2023.
