= List of Supergirl episodes =

Supergirl is an American superhero action-adventure drama television series developed by Ali Adler, Greg Berlanti, and Andrew Kreisberg, based on the DC Comics character Supergirl, created by Otto Binder and Al Plastino, that originally aired on CBS and premiered on October 26, 2015. Supergirl is a costumed superheroine who is the biological cousin to Superman and one of the last surviving Kryptonians. The series was officially picked up on May 6, 2015, and received a full season order on November 30, 2015. The series moved from CBS to The CW from its second season onwards.

During the course of the series, 126 episodes of Supergirl aired, between October 26, 2015, and November 9, 2021.

== Series overview ==
Overview of Supergirl seasons
| Season | Episodes | Originally released | | | Rank | Average viewership (in millions) |
| Season | Episodes | First released | Last released | Network | Rank | Average viewership (in millions) |
|---|---|---|---|---|---|---|
| 1 | 20 | October 26, 2015 | April 18, 2016 | CBS | 39 | 9.81 |
| 2 | 22 | October 10, 2016 | May 22, 2017 | The CW | 129 | 3.12 |
| 3 | 23 | October 9, 2017 | June 18, 2018 | The CW | 154 | 2.82 |
| 4 | 22 | October 14, 2018 | May 19, 2019 | The CW | 169 | 1.67 |
| 5 | 19 | October 6, 2019 | May 17, 2020 | The CW | 118 | 1.58 |
| 6 | 20 | March 30, 2021 | November 9, 2021 | The CW | 140 | 1.17 |

== Episodes ==
=== Season 1 (2015–16) ===
Supergirl, season 1 episodes
| No. overall | No. in season | Title | Directed by | Written by | Original release date | Prod. code | U.S. viewers (millions) |
|---|---|---|---|---|---|---|---|
| 1 | 1 | "Pilot" | Glen Winter | Story by : Greg Berlanti & Ali Adler & Andrew Kreisberg; Teleplay by : Ali Adler | October 26, 2015 | 276088 | 12.96 |
| 2 | 2 | "Stronger Together" | Glen Winter | Story by : Greg Berlanti & Andrew Kreisberg; Teleplay by : Andrew Kreisberg & Ali Adler | November 2, 2015 | 4X7602 | 8.87 |
| 3 | 3 | "Fight or Flight" | Dermott Downs | Michael Grassi & Rachel Shukert | November 9, 2015 | 4X7603 | 8.07 |
| 4 | 4 | "How Does She Do It?" | Thor Freudenthal | Yahlin Chang & Ted Sullivan | November 23, 2015 (Note: Following the November 2015 Paris attacks, the episode "How Does She Do It?", which features content similar to the attacks and was originally scheduled to air as the fourth episode of the season on November 16, 2015, was pulled from its scheduled airing. In its place, the episode "Livewire", which was originally scheduled to air as the fifth episode on November 23, 2015, was aired. "How Does She Do It?" then aired as the fifth episode on November 23. For the season's home media release, the episodes were restored to their original production order, which is how the episodes are presented here.) | 4X7604 | 7.19 |
| 5 | 5 | "Livewire" | Kevin Tancharoen | Roberto Aguirre-Sacasa & Caitlin Parrish | November 16, 2015 | 4X7605 | 7.77 |
| 6 | 6 | "Red Faced" | Jesse Warn | Michael Grassi & Rachel Shukert | November 30, 2015 | 4X7606 | 8.02 |
| 7 | 7 | "Human for a Day" | Larry Teng | Yahlin Chang & Ted Sullivan | December 7, 2015 | 4X7607 | 7.67 |
| 8 | 8 | "Hostile Takeover" | Karen Gaviola | Roberto Aguirre-Sacasa & Caitlin Parrish | December 14, 2015 | 4X7608 | 7.28 |
| 9 | 9 | "Blood Bonds" | Steve Shill | Ted Sullivan & Derek Simon | January 4, 2016 | 4X7609 | 8.75 |
| 10 | 10 | "Childish Things" | Jamie Babbit | Story by : Yahlin Chang; Teleplay by : Anna Musky-Goldwyn & James DeWille | January 18, 2016 | 4X7610 | 8.77 |
| 11 | 11 | "Strange Visitor from Another Planet" | Glen Winter | Michael Grassi & Caitlin Parrish | January 25, 2016 | 4X7611 | 7.90 |
| 12 | 12 | "Bizarro" | John Showalter | Roberto Aguirre-Sacasa & Rachel Shukert | February 1, 2016 | 4X7612 | 6.68 |
| 13 | 13 | "For the Girl Who Has Everything" | Dermott Downs | Story by : Andrew Kreisberg; Teleplay by : Ted Sullivan & Derek Simon | February 8, 2016 | 4X7613 | 7.92 |
| 14 | 14 | "Truth, Justice and the American Way" | Lexi Alexander | Story by : Michael Grassi; Teleplay by : Yahlin Chang & Caitlin Parrish | February 22, 2016 | 4X7614 | 7.25 |
| 15 | 15 | "Solitude" | Dermott Downs | Story by : Rachel Shukert; Teleplay by : Anna Musky-Goldwyn & James DeWille | February 29, 2016 | 4X7615 | 6.69 |
| 16 | 16 | "Falling" | Larry Teng | Robert Rovner & Jessica Queller | March 14, 2016 | 4X7616 | 6.53 |
| 17 | 17 | "Manhunter" | Chris Fisher | Story by : Derek Simon; Teleplay by : Cindy Lichtman & Rachel Shukert | March 21, 2016 | 4X7617 | 6.00 |
| 18 | 18 | "Worlds Finest" | Nick Gomez | Story by : Greg Berlanti; Teleplay by : Andrew Kreisberg & Michael Grassi | March 28, 2016 | 4X7618 | 7.17 |
| 19 | 19 | "Myriad" | Adam Kane | Yahlin Chang & Caitlin Parrish | April 11, 2016 | 4X7619 | 6.12 |
| 20 | 20 | "Better Angels" | Larry Teng | Story by : Andrew Kreisberg & Ali Adler; Teleplay by : Robert Rovner & Jessica Queller | April 18, 2016 | 4X7620 | 6.11 |

=== Season 2 (2016–17) ===
Supergirl, season 2 episodes
| No. overall | No. in season | Title | Directed by | Written by | Original release date | Prod. code | U.S. viewers (millions) |
|---|---|---|---|---|---|---|---|
| 21 | 1 | "The Adventures of Supergirl" | Glen Winter | Story by : Greg Berlanti & Andrew Kreisberg; Teleplay by : Andrew Kreisberg & Jessica Queller | October 10, 2016 | T13.20151 | 3.06 |
| 22 | 2 | "The Last Children of Krypton" | Glen Winter | Robert Rovner & Caitlin Parrish | October 17, 2016 | T13.20152 | 2.66 |
| 23 | 3 | "Welcome to Earth" | Rachel Talalay | Jessica Queller & Derek Simon | October 24, 2016 | T13.20153 | 2.65 |
| 24 | 4 | "Survivors" | James Marshall and James Bamford | Paula Yoo & Eric Carrasco | October 31, 2016 | T13.20154 | 2.22 |
| 25 | 5 | "Crossfire" | Glen Winter | Gabriel Llanas & Anna Musky-Goldwyn | November 7, 2016 | T13.20155 | 2.47 |
| 26 | 6 | "Changing" | Larry Teng | Story by : Greg Berlanti; Teleplay by : Andrew Kreisberg & Caitlin Parrish | November 14, 2016 | T13.20156 | 2.35 |
| 27 | 7 | "The Darkest Place" | Glen Winter | Robert Rovner & Paula Yoo | November 21, 2016 | T13.20157 | 2.61 |
| 28 | 8 | "Medusa" | Stefan Pleszczynski | Jessica Queller & Derek Simon | November 28, 2016 | T13.20158 | 3.53 |
| 29 | 9 | "Supergirl Lives" | Kevin Smith | Story by : Andrew Kreisberg; Teleplay by : Eric Carrasco & Jess Kardos | January 23, 2017 | T13.20159 | 2.65 |
| 30 | 10 | "We Can Be Heroes" | Rebecca Johnson | Caitlin Parrish & Katie Rose Rogers | January 30, 2017 | T13.20160 | 2.35 |
| 31 | 11 | "The Martian Chronicles" | David McWhirter | Gabriel Llanas & Anna Musky-Goldwyn | February 6, 2017 | T13.20161 | 2.43 |
| 32 | 12 | "Luthors" | Tawnia McKiernan | Robert Rovner & Cindy Lichtman | February 13, 2017 | T13.20162 | 2.52 |
| 33 | 13 | "Mr. & Mrs. Mxyzptlk" | Stefan Pleszczynski | Jessica Queller & Sterling Gates | February 20, 2017 | T13.20163 | 2.24 |
| 34 | 14 | "Homecoming" | Larry Teng | Caitlin Parrish & Derek Simon | February 27, 2017 | T13.20164 | 2.17 |
| 35 | 15 | "Exodus" | Michael Allowitz | Paula Yoo & Eric Carrasco | March 6, 2017 | T13.20165 | 2.16 |
| 36 | 16 | "Star-Crossed" | John Medlen | Katie Rose Rogers & Jess Kardos | March 20, 2017 | T13.20166 | 2.07 |
| 37 | 17 | "Distant Sun" | Kevin Smith | Gabriel Llanas & Anna Musky-Goldwyn | March 27, 2017 | T13.20167 | 2.21 |
| 38 | 18 | "Ace Reporter" | Armen V. Kevorkian | Paula Yoo & Caitlin Parrish | April 24, 2017 | T13.20168 | 1.80 |
| 39 | 19 | "Alex" | Rob Greenlea | Eric Carrasco & Greg Baldwin | May 1, 2017 | T13.20169 | 1.75 |
| 40 | 20 | "City of Lost Children" | Ben Bray | Story by : Robert Rovner; Teleplay by : Gabriel Llanas & Anna Musky-Goldwyn | May 8, 2017 | T13.20170 | 1.88 |
| 41 | 21 | "Resist" | Millicent Shelton | Jessica Queller & Derek Simon | May 15, 2017 | T13.20171 | 1.93 |
| 42 | 22 | "Nevertheless, She Persisted" | Glen Winter | Story by : Andrew Kreisberg & Jessica Queller; Teleplay by : Robert Rovner & Caitlin Parrish | May 22, 2017 | T13.20172 | 2.12 |

=== Season 3 (2017–18) ===
Supergirl, season 3 episodes
| No. overall | No. in season | Title | Directed by | Written by | Original release date | Prod. code | U.S. viewers (millions) |
|---|---|---|---|---|---|---|---|
| 43 | 1 | "Girl of Steel" | Jesse Warn | Story by : Andrew Kreisberg; Teleplay by : Robert Rovner & Caitlin Parrish | October 9, 2017 | T13.20651 | 1.87 |
| 44 | 2 | "Triggers" | David McWhirter | Gabriel Llanas & Anna Musky-Goldwyn | October 16, 2017 | T13.20652 | 1.76 |
| 45 | 3 | "Far from the Tree" | Dermott Downs | Jessica Queller & Derek Simon | October 23, 2017 | T13.20653 | 1.76 |
| 46 | 4 | "The Faithful" | Jesse Warn | Paula Yoo & Katie Rose Rogers | October 30, 2017 | T13.20654 | 1.82 |
| 47 | 5 | "Damage" | Kevin Smith | Eric Carrasco & Cindy Lichtman | November 6, 2017 | T13.20655 | 1.87 |
| 48 | 6 | "Midvale" | Rob Greenlea | Caitlin Parrish & Jess Kardos | November 13, 2017 | T13.20656 | 1.89 |
| 49 | 7 | "Wake Up" | Chad Lowe | Gabriel Llanas & Anna Musky-Goldwyn | November 20, 2017 | T13.20657 | 1.92 |
| 50 | 8 | "Crisis on Earth-X, Part 1" | Larry Teng | Story by : Andrew Kreisberg & Marc Guggenheim; Teleplay by : Robert Rovner & Jessica Queller | November 27, 2017 | T13.20658 | 2.71 |
| 51 | 9 | "Reign" | Glen Winter | Paula Yoo & Caitlin Parrish | December 4, 2017 | T13.20659 | 1.81 |
| 52 | 10 | "Legion of Superheroes" | Jesse Warn | Derek Simon & Eric Carrasco | January 15, 2018 | T13.20660 | 2.17 |
| 53 | 11 | "Fort Rozz" | Gregory Smith | Gabriel Llanas & Anna Musky-Goldwyn | January 22, 2018 | T13.20661 | 2.07 |
| 54 | 12 | "For Good" | Tawnia McKiernan | Story by : Robert Rovner; Teleplay by : Cindy Lichtman & Alix Sternberg | January 29, 2018 | T13.20662 | 2.11 |
| 55 | 13 | "Both Sides Now" | Jesse Warn | Jessica Queller & Paula Yoo | February 5, 2018 | T13.20663 | 2.12 |
| 56 | 14 | "Schott Through the Heart" | Glen Winter | Caitlin Parrish & Derek Simon | April 16, 2018 | T13.20664 | 1.91 |
| 57 | 15 | "In Search of Lost Time" | Andi Armaganian | Story by : Eric Carrasco; Teleplay by : Katie Rose Rogers & Nicki Holcomb | April 23, 2018 | T13.20665 | 1.38 |
| 58 | 16 | "Of Two Minds" | Alexandra La Roche | Gabriel Llanas & Anna Musky-Goldwyn | April 30, 2018 | T13.20666 | 1.50 |
| 59 | 17 | "Trinity" | Jesse Warn | Story by : Jessica Queller; Teleplay by : Caitlin Parrish & Derek Simon | May 7, 2018 | T13.20667 | 1.60 |
| 60 | 18 | "Shelter from the Storm" | Antonio Negret | Story by : Robert Rovner; Teleplay by : Lindsay Gelfand & Allison Weintraub | May 14, 2018 | T13.20668 | 1.53 |
| 61 | 19 | "The Fanatical" | Mairzee Almas | Paula Yoo & Eric Carrasco | May 21, 2018 | T13.20669 | 1.47 |
| 62 | 20 | "Dark Side of the Moon" | Hanelle Culpepper | Derek Simon & Katie Rose Rogers | May 28, 2018 | T13.20670 | 1.57 |
| 63 | 21 | "Not Kansas" | Dermott Downs | Gabriel Llanas & Anna Musky-Goldwyn | June 4, 2018 | T13.20671 | 1.83 |
| 64 | 22 | "Make it Reign" | Armen V. Kevorkian | Ray Utarnachitt & Cindy Lichtman | June 11, 2018 | T13.20672 | 1.76 |
| 65 | 23 | "Battles Lost and Won" | Jesse Warn | Robert Rovner & Jessica Queller | June 18, 2018 | T13.20673 | 1.78 |

=== Season 4 (2018–19) ===
Supergirl, season 4 episodes
| No. overall | No. in season | Title | Directed by | Written by | Original release date | Prod. code | U.S. viewers (millions) |
|---|---|---|---|---|---|---|---|
| 66 | 1 | "American Alien" | Jesse Warn | Story by : Robert Rovner & Jessica Queller; Teleplay by : Gabriel Llanas & Aadrita Mukerji | October 14, 2018 | T13.21201 | 1.52 |
| 67 | 2 | "Fallout" | Harry Jierjian | Story by : Dana Horgan; Teleplay by : Maria Maggenti & Daniel Beaty | October 21, 2018 | T13.21202 | 1.34 |
| 68 | 3 | "Man of Steel" | Jesse Warn | Rob Wright & Derek Simon | October 28, 2018 | T13.21203 | 1.28 |
| 69 | 4 | "Ahimsa" | Armen V. Kevorkian | Story by : Eric Carrasco; Teleplay by : Katie Rose Rogers & Jess Kardos | November 4, 2018 | T13.21204 | 1.23 |
| 70 | 5 | "Parasite Lost" | David McWhirter | Maria Maggenti & Aadrita Mukerji | November 11, 2018 | T13.21205 | 1.16 |
| 71 | 6 | "Call to Action" | Antonio Negret | Gabriel Llanas & Daniel Beaty | November 18, 2018 | T13.21206 | 1.13 |
| 72 | 7 | "Rather the Fallen Angel" | Chad Lowe | Dana Horgan & Katie Rose Rogers | November 25, 2018 | T13.21207 | 1.15 |
| 73 | 8 | "Bunker Hill" | Kevin Smith | Rob Wright & Eric Carrasco | December 2, 2018 | T13.21208 | 1.26 |
| 74 | 9 | "Elseworlds, Part 3" | Jesse Warn | Story by : Marc Guggenheim; Teleplay by : Derek Simon & Robert Rovner | December 11, 2018 | T13.21209 | 2.17 |
| 75 | 10 | "Suspicious Minds" | Rachel Talalay | Maria Maggenti & Gabriel Llanas | January 20, 2019 | T13.21210 | 1.04 |
| 76 | 11 | "Blood Memory" | Shannon Kohli | Jessica Queller & Dana Horgan | January 27, 2019 | T13.21211 | 1.34 |
| 77 | 12 | "Menagerie" | Stefan Pleszczynski | Story by : Robert Rovner; Teleplay by : Daniel Beaty & Greg Baldwin | February 17, 2019 | T13.21212 | 1.15 |
| 78 | 13 | "What's So Funny About Truth, Justice, and the American Way?" | Alexis Ostrander | Eric Carrasco & Aadrita Mukerji | March 3, 2019 | T13.21213 | 1.14 |
| 79 | 14 | "Stand and Deliver" | Andi Armaganian | Rob Wright & Jess Kardos | March 10, 2019 | T13.21214 | 1.05 |
| 80 | 15 | "O Brother, Where Art Thou?" | Tawnia McKiernan | Derek Simon & Nicki Holcomb | March 17, 2019 | T13.21215 | 1.07 |
| 81 | 16 | "The House of L" | Carl Seaton | Dana Horgan & Eric Carrasco | March 24, 2019 | T13.21216 | 1.12 |
| 82 | 17 | "All About Eve" | Ben Bray | Story by : Gabriel Llanas; Teleplay by : Katie Rose Rogers & Brooke Pohl | March 31, 2019 | T13.21217 | 1.06 |
| 83 | 18 | "Crime and Punishment" | Antonio Negret | Story by : Rob Wright; Teleplay by : Lindsay Sturman & Aadrita Mukerji | April 21, 2019 | T13.21218 | 0.99 |
| 84 | 19 | "American Dreamer" | David Harewood | Story by : Dana Horgan; Teleplay by : Daniel Beaty & Jess Kardos | April 28, 2019 | T13.21219 | 1.14 |
| 85 | 20 | "Will the Real Miss Tessmacher Please Stand Up?" | Shannon Kohli | Story by : Derek Simon; Teleplay by : Katie Rose Rogers & Natalie Abrams | May 5, 2019 | T13.21220 | 1.05 |
| 86 | 21 | "Red Dawn" | Alexis Ostrander | Story by : Lindsay Sturman; Teleplay by : Gabriel Llanas & Eric Carrasco | May 12, 2019 | T13.21221 | 1.11 |
| 87 | 22 | "The Quest for Peace" | Jesse Warn | Story by : Robert Rovner & Jessica Queller; Teleplay by : Rob Wright & Derek Simon | May 19, 2019 | T13.21222 | 1.07 |

=== Season 5 (2019–20) ===
Supergirl, season 5 episodes
| No. overall | No. in season | Title | Directed by | Written by | Original release date | Prod. code | U.S. viewers (millions) |
|---|---|---|---|---|---|---|---|
| 88 | 1 | "Event Horizon" | Jesse Warn | Derek Simon & Nicki Holcomb | October 6, 2019 | T13.21801 | 1.26 |
| 89 | 2 | "Stranger Beside Me" | David McWhirter | Dana Horgan & Katie Rose Rogers | October 13, 2019 | T13.21802 | 0.97 |
| 90 | 3 | "Blurred Lines" | Eric Dean Seaton | Lindsay Sturman & J. Holtham | October 20, 2019 | T13.21803 | 0.92 |
| 91 | 4 | "In Plain Sight" | David McWhirter | Jay Faerber & Jess Kardos | October 27, 2019 | T13.21804 | 0.95 |
| 92 | 5 | "Dangerous Liaisons" | Alysse Leite-Rogers | Rob Wright & Daniel Beaty | November 3, 2019 | T13.21805 | 0.78 |
| 93 | 6 | "Confidence Women" | Shannon Kohli | Dana Horgan & Nicki Holcomb | November 10, 2019 | T13.21806 | 0.84 |
| 94 | 7 | "Tremors" | Andi Armaganian | J. Holtham & Katie Rose Rogers | November 17, 2019 | T13.21807 | 0.79 |
| 95 | 8 | "The Wrath of Rama Khan" | Marcus Stokes | Lindsay Sturman & Jess Kardos | December 1, 2019 | T13.21808 | 0.87 |
| 96 | 9 | "Crisis on Infinite Earths: Part One" | Jesse Warn | Story by : Robert Rovner & Marc Guggenheim; Teleplay by : Derek Simon & Jay Faerber | December 8, 2019 | T13.21809 | 1.67 |
| 97 | 10 | "The Bottle Episode" | Tawnia McKiernan | Story by : Derek Simon; Teleplay by : Nicki Holcomb & Jen Troy | January 19, 2020 | T13.21810 | 0.84 |
| 98 | 11 | "Back from the Future – Part One" | David Harewood | Dana Horgan & Katie Rose Rogers | January 26, 2020 | T13.21811 | 0.81 |
| 99 | 12 | "Back from the Future – Part Two" | Alexis Ostrander | Rob Wright & J. Holtham | February 16, 2020 | T13.21812 | 0.65 |
| 100 | 13 | "It's a Super Life" | Jesse Warn | Story by : Robert Rovner & Jessica Queller; Teleplay by : Derek Simon & Nicki Holcomb | February 23, 2020 | T13.21813 | 0.66 |
| 101 | 14 | "The Bodyguard" | Gregory Smith | Story by : Lindsay Sturman; Teleplay by : Emilio Ortega Aldrich & Chandler Smidt | March 8, 2020 | T13.21814 | 0.67 |
| 102 | 15 | "Reality Bytes" | Armen V. Kevorkian | Dana Horgan & Jay Faerber | March 15, 2020 | T13.21815 | 0.68 |
| 103 | 16 | "Alex in Wonderland" | Tawnia McKiernan | Story by : Rob Wright; Teleplay by : Jess Kardos & Mariko Tamaki | March 22, 2020 | T13.21816 | 0.65 |
| 104 | 17 | "Deus Lex Machina" | Melissa Benoist | Story by : Lindsay Sturman; Teleplay by : Katie Rose Rogers & Brooke Pohl | May 3, 2020 | T13.21817 | 0.61 |
| 105 | 18 | "The Missing Link" | Avi Youabian | Dana Horgan & J. Holtham | May 10, 2020 | T13.21818 | 0.62 |
| 106 | 19 | "Immortal Kombat" | David Harewood | Story by : Derek Simon; Teleplay by : Emilio Ortego Aldrich & Nicki Holcomb | May 17, 2020 | T13.21819 | 0.65 |

=== Season 6 (2021) ===
Supergirl, season 6 episodes
| No. overall | No. in season | Title | Directed by | Written by | Original release date | Prod. code | U.S. viewers (millions) |
|---|---|---|---|---|---|---|---|
| 107 | 1 | "Rebirth" | Jesse Warn | Story by : Robert Rovner & Jessica Queller; Teleplay by : Jay Faerber & Jess Kardos | March 30, 2021 | T13.22601 | 0.73 |
| 108 | 2 | "A Few Good Women" | Jesse Warn | Derek Simon & Elle Lipson | April 6, 2021 | T13.22602 | 0.69 |
| 109 | 3 | "Phantom Menaces" | Sudz Sutherland | Dana Horgan & Emilio Ortega Aldrich | April 13, 2021 | T13.22603 | 0.59 |
| 110 | 4 | "Lost Souls" | Alysse Leite-Rogers | Karen E. Maser & Nicki Holcomb | April 20, 2021 | T13.22604 | 0.59 |
| 111 | 5 | "Prom Night!" | Alexandra La Roche | Rob Wright & Jess Kardos | April 27, 2021 | T13.22605 | 0.50 |
| 112 | 6 | "Prom Again!" | Chyler Leigh | Rob Wright & Jess Kardos | May 4, 2021 | T13.22606 | 0.62 |
| 113 | 7 | "Fear Knot" | David Harewood | J. Holtham & Elle Lipson | May 11, 2021 | T13.22607 | 0.47 |
| 114 | 8 | "Welcome Back, Kara" | Armen V. Kevorkian | Dana Horgan & Jay Faerber | August 24, 2021 | T13.22608 | 0.56 |
| 115 | 9 | "Dream Weaver" | Shannon Kohli | Karen E. Maser & Emilio Ortega Aldrich | August 31, 2021 | T13.22609 | 0.59 |
| 116 | 10 | "Still I Rise" | Jesse Warn | Story by : Jess Kardos; Teleplay by : Nicki Holcomb & Jen Troy | September 7, 2021 | T13.22610 | 0.48 |
| 117 | 11 | "Mxy in the Middle" | Glen Winter | Story by : Rob Wright; Teleplay by : Elle Lipson & Chandler Smidt | September 14, 2021 | T13.22611 | 0.40 |
| 118 | 12 | "Blind Spots" | David Ramsey | J. Holtham & Azie Tesfai | September 21, 2021 | T13.22612 | 0.48 |
| 119 | 13 | "The Gauntlet" | Tawnia McKiernan | Story by : Dana Horgan; Teleplay by : Jay Faerber & Brooke Pohl | September 28, 2021 | T13.22613 | 0.40 |
| 120 | 14 | "Magical Thinking" | Simon Burnett | Karen E. Maser & Derek Simon | October 5, 2021 | T13.22614 | 0.42 |
| 121 | 15 | "Hope for Tomorrow" | Tawnia McKiernan | Story by : Robert Rovner; Teleplay by : Emilio Ortega Aldrich & Nicki Holcomb | October 12, 2021 | T13.22615 | 0.38 |
| 122 | 16 | "Nightmare in National City" | Eric Dean Seaton | Rob Wright & Jess Kardos | October 19, 2021 | T13.22616 | 0.42 |
| 123 | 17 | "I Believe in a Thing Called Love" | Jesse Warn | Dana Horgan & Nicki Holcomb | October 26, 2021 | T13.22617 | 0.45 |
| 124 | 18 | "Truth or Consequences" | David McWhirter | Story by : Karen E. Maser; Teleplay by : Emilio Ortega Aldrich & Elle Lipson | November 2, 2021 | T13.22618 | 0.40 |
| 125 | 19 | "The Last Gauntlet" | Glen Winter | Story by : J. Holtham; Teleplay by : Derek Simon & Jay Faerber | November 9, 2021 | T13.22619 | 0.59 |
| 126 | 20 | "Kara" | Jesse Warn | Story by : Robert Rovner & Jessica Queller; Teleplay by : Rob Wright & Derek Simon | November 9, 2021 | T13.22620 | 0.49 |
