= Supergirl season 1 =

Supergirl
- Season 1
- Home media cover
- Showrunners: Greg Berlanti; Andrew Kreisberg; Ali Adler
- Starring: Melissa Benoist; Mehcad Brooks; Chyler Leigh; Jeremy Jordan; David Harewood; Calista Flockhart
- No. of episodes: 20

Release
- Original network: CBS
- Original release: October 26, 2015 – April 18, 2016

Season chronology
- Next → Season 2

The first season of the American television series Supergirl, which is based on the DC Comics character Supergirl / Kara Zor-El, a costumed superheroine who is the cousin to Superman and one of the last surviving Kryptonians.

Supergirl was ordered to series in May 2015, and later picked up for a full season in November 2015, with filming taking place primarily in Los Angeles. Melissa Benoist stars in the title role, and is joined by principal cast members Mehcad Brooks, Chyler Leigh, Jeremy Jordan, David Harewood, and Calista Flockhart.

The series premiere was watched by 12.96 million viewers, tied with NBC's Blindspot as the top-rated series premiere of the 2015–16 fall season. The season, which premiered on CBS on October 26, 2015, and ran until April 18, 2016, over 20 episodes, overall received positive reviews. The series was renewed for a second season on May 12, 2016, and moved to The CW. This is the only season to air on CBS.

On both the original broadcast, and still on some streaming services the order of episodes 4 and 5 is reversed. However, they are in this listed order on home video.

== Episodes ==
Supergirl, season 1 episodes
No. overall	No. in season	Title	Directed by	Written by	Original release date	Prod. code	U.S. viewers (millions)
1	1	"Pilot"	Glen Winter	Story by : Greg Berlanti & Ali Adler & Andrew Kreisberg; Teleplay by : Ali Adler	October 26, 2015	276088	12.96
Cousins Kal-El and Kara Zor-El are sent to Earth before Krypton's impending destruction. The planet's implosion forces Kara's ship off course and into the Phantom Zone for 24 years, before landing on Earth. Kal, now operating as the superhero Superman in Metropolis, puts Kara in the care of the Danvers in National City. Twelve years later, Kara, working at CatCo Worldwide Media, reveals her powers as a vigilante. She tells her co-worker, Winn Schott, about her secret and he starts aiding her. Her cold-hearted boss, Cat Grant, titles the vigilante "Supergirl". Alex, Kara's adoptive sister, works at the Department of Extranormal Operations (DEO), under the leadership of Hank Henshaw, investigating alien activity. Kara learns that there are hundreds of aliens on Earth, most of whom came from a prison that was run by her mother, Alura. Her actions attract the attention of an alien called Vartox, and she is able to defeat him, although he then kills himself. James Olsen, another one of Kara's colleagues, reveals that Kal sent him to look after her and presents her with a new cape. Vartox's superior is revealed to be Astra In-Ze, Alura's identical twin sister, who wants to conquer Earth.
2	2	"Stronger Together"	Glen Winter	Story by : Greg Berlanti & Andrew Kreisberg; Teleplay by : Andrew Kreisberg & Ali Adler	November 2, 2015	4X7602	8.87
In an effort to put a positive image on Supergirl in the wake of a serious mishap, Kara asks Winn and James to help her perfect her skills, while Hank and Alex put Kara through extensive physical training. Kara learns that an alien of the Hellgrammite species who escaped from Fort Rozz, Alura's prison, is on Earth searching for chlorine-based food. The DEO prepares an ambush for the Hellgrammite, but it escapes, kidnaps Alex, and takes her to Astra, who uses Alex as a trap for Kara. As Kara and Astra fight, Hank injures Astra with a Kryptonite knife and Alex kills the Hellgrammite. Learning that Kara has become more powerful than she had imagined and that humanity has a means of weakening Kryptonians, Astra muses that her "plans" may need to be postponed. Alex provides Kara with an interactive artificial intelligence of Alura's consciousness. Meanwhile, Cat pressures James to get her an interview with Supergirl. In the end, Kara agrees to the interview and prevents James from getting fired. It is also revealed that Hank might have a secret of his own when his eyes glow red.
3	3	"Fight or Flight"	Dermott Downs	Michael Grassi & Rachel Shukert	November 9, 2015	4X7603	8.07
During the interview with Cat, Kara accidentally reveals that she is Superman's cousin. After Cat exposes the relationship, Kara is attacked by Reactron, who seeks to kill her in order to get his revenge on Superman, but she manages to send him fleeing. He later goes to LORD Technology labs and kidnaps Maxwell Lord to get him to fix his suit. Kara later learns that a reactor meltdown Superman stopped in the past killed Reactron's wife. She goes to the hideout of Reactron, identified as Ben Krull, and manages to save Maxwell, only to get badly injured by Krull afterwards, but Superman comes to save her. She gets mad at James for calling Superman for help. During a party Cat organized, Krull breaks in to find Supergirl. While James distracts Reactron, Kara covers her hand in lead so that she can use it to safely remove the power core in Krull's suit and defeat him. Kara, who has feelings for James, witnesses his ex-girlfriend, Lucy Lane, also Lois Lane's younger sister, paying him a visit to restart their relationship.
4	4	"How Does She Do It?"	Thor Freudenthal	Yahlin Chang & Ted Sullivan	November 23, 2015 (Note: Following the November 2015 Paris attacks, the episode "How Does She Do It?", which features content similar to the attacks and was originally scheduled to air as the fourth episode of the season on November 16, 2015, was pulled from its scheduled airing. In its place, the episode "Livewire", which was originally scheduled to air as the fifth episode on November 23, 2015, was aired. "How Does She Do It?" then aired as the fifth episode on November 23. For the season's home media release, the episodes were restored to their original production order, which is how the episodes are presented here.)	4X7604	7.19
Cat leaves town, entrusting her son Carter to Kara. A bomber starts targeting Lord's company. On the opening night of Lord's new bullet train, Kara and the DEO find out about two bomb threats simultaneously, one at the airport and one on the train. The DEO goes to the airport, where Hank secretly uses his powers to deactivate the bomb. Kara goes to the train to save Carter, who is on it with the bomber. As she confronts the bomber, he claims that he is doing it for his daughter. He requests her to save the people on the train after he starts the timer, killing himself. At DEO headquarters, Alex finds a fail-safe in the bomb defused by Hank, who claimed it was just a decoy. Kara deduces that Lord was the one behind the bombings. As Supergirl, she confronts Lord, who implies that the threats were used to test her skills. He also vows to find the person important to her on the train. Meanwhile, James initially refuses to date Lucy, but Kara convinces him to return to her.
5	5	"Livewire"	Kevin Tancharoen	Roberto Aguirre-Sacasa & Caitlin Parrish	November 16, 2015	4X7605	7.77
After fighting an alien escapee, Kara meets Alex at the apartment to greet the latter's mother, Eliza, for Thanksgiving, inviting Winn due to his lack of plans. CatCo's shock jock, Leslie Willis is demoted by Cat to traffic reporting after a controversial bashing of Supergirl. During a severe thunderstorm, Kara tries to save Leslie, but lightning strikes them both, imbuing Leslie with electromagnetic powers. Leslie takes the name "Livewire" and tries to take revenge on Cat, but Kara eventually stops her and she is imprisoned at the DEO. Cat and Kara become closer. Meanwhile, Alex tells Eliza in a fit of rage at the dinner table that she's actually working for the DEO. Eliza reveals to Alex and Kara that her husband, Jeremiah, offered himself up to work for Henshaw in exchange for Kara's safety and then died mysteriously. Alex and Kara decide to investigate Henshaw and find the truth about Jeremiah's death.
6	6	"Red Faced"	Jesse Warn	Michael Grassi & Rachel Shukert	November 30, 2015	4X7606	8.02
Kara hurts a civilian due to her uncontrolled anger. Sam Lane, Lucy's father and also a military general, arrives at the DEO with her as his attache, demanding Supergirl let them test her powers by fighting an android called Red Tornado, which is invented by T.O. Morrow. She overpowers Red Tornado, leading to Sam firing Morrow. Sam is later attacked by Red Tornado, but Kara saves him. The DEO realizes that Red Tornado is actually a drone controlled by Morrow. Alex and Kara engage Morrow and Red Tornado, respectively. Alex kills Morrow, making Red Tornado engage Kara without control. She uses her heat vision at full force to destroy it. Lucy resigns from military service in order to stay with James. Kara finds out that her powers have diminished when she cuts herself and starts bleeding. Meanwhile, Winn informs Kara and Alex that Jeremiah and Hank went on a mission in South America, where Jeremiah died, deducing that Hank is the last person to have seen him alive.
7	7	"Human for a Day"	Larry Teng	Yahlin Chang & Ted Sullivan	December 7, 2015	4X7607	7.67
As Kara tries to adapt to life without her powers, an earthquake hits National City. Winn informs Kara that she needs a rise of adrenalin in her blood to regain her powers. The team begins saving the CatCo staff upstairs by the elevator shaft, from where James falls after saving everyone. Kara regains her powers and saves him before rushing to help the citizens. Winn becomes jealous of the intimacy between her and James. Afterwards, Kara is attacked by Astra and her operatives. Meanwhile, the earthquake causes a DEO prisoner called Jemm, who has psychic abilities to read and control minds, to escape. Hank locks the facility and takes a team to engage Jemm, with the former being the only survivor. This causes Alex to become more suspicious of Hank. She locks him in a room and engages Jemm alone, being overpowered, but Hank arrives in time and kills him. He explains to her that he is the sole survivor of an alien species and his name is J'onn J'onzz. The real Hank Henshaw died after killing Jeremiah, who had turned against him to protect J'onn, who assumed Hank's shape and identity.
8	8	"Hostile Takeover"	Karen Gaviola	Roberto Aguirre-Sacasa & Caitlin Parrish	December 14, 2015	4X7608	7.28
Kara is overpowered by Astra and escapes. In a second duel, the former defeats the latter and brings her to the DEO, where the latter states that all she wanted was to save Krypton, the same thing she wants for Earth. She also reveals that Alura used Kara on Krypton to arrest the former. Kara confronts the interactive artificial intelligence of Alura, who refuses to confirm that Astra's plan could have worked. It is revealed that Astra wanted to get arrested in order to divert attention from her husband, Non, and his team from attacking LORD Technologies. Kara rushes there and engages him. Meanwhile, Cat's emails are hacked and her personal information is leaked to the press. Kara finds out that the chairman of the board was behind the hack and provides Cat with evidence by the help of James, Lucy and Winn, leading to the chairman's arrest. Kara also finds out from the leaks that Cat has a 24-year-old son named Adam Foster. Cat reveals to Kara that she has found out about the latter's alter ego.
9	9	"Blood Bonds"	Steve Shill	Ted Sullivan & Derek Simon	January 4, 2016	4X7609	8.75
Non overpowers Kara and leaves with Hank. Lord sends the DEO away from his facility, vowing to defend it himself, and returns to a secret experiment he is conducting. Non offers to trade Hank for Astra, but Sam, who is placed in charge of the DEO by the President, refuses. He tortures Astra for Non's location, and walks into a trap placed by Non. Kara is distraught over both her defeat and the fact that Cat will fire her unless she is convinced that Kara is not Supergirl. Kara goes to the DEO and talks with Astra who tells her that Alura believed her claim that Krypton was doomed, but sentenced her for her illegal methods while promising to work for her cause. Alex and Kara make the trade over Lane's objections and Astra orders Non to withdraw despite his numerical advantage. Sam and his men leave the DEO. Hank uses his shape-shifting power to present Cat with Kara and Supergirl simultaneously, casting doubt on her initial deduction of their identities. Kara, James and Winn decide to find the secret about Lord, who is shown in possession of an alien woman.
10	10	"Childish Things"	Jamie Babbit	Story by : Yahlin Chang; Teleplay by : Anna Musky-Goldwyn & James DeWille	January 18, 2016	4X7610	8.77
Winn's father, known as the Toyman, escapes from prison, leaving the former a message to meet him. Winn tells the FBI about it. They find it a trap, but Kara saves them. Winn reveals that his father's boss, Chester Dunholtz, stole his toy designs, leading to the Toyman trying to kill Dunholtz, killing other people instead and going to jail. The Toyman kidnaps Winn, demanding him to attend a ceremony to kill Dunholtz and threatening to kill the other guests by the bombs he has planted. Kara manages to save the guests and have the Toyman arrested. Lucy accepts Cat's job offer and Winn addresses his feelings to Kara. Meanwhile, Alex goes to dinner with Maxwell, giving Hank the chance to infiltrate LORD Technologies by shapeshifting into Maxwell. He finds the woman and takes pictures, but is forced to clear a security guard's memory to escape without arousing suspicion. Maxwell is revealed to be monitoring Alex using a camera and microphone he planted on her purse. He finds out about Supergirl's identity.
11	11	"Strange Visitor from Another Planet"	Glen Winter	Michael Grassi & Caitlin Parrish	January 25, 2016	4X7611	7.90
Miranda Crane, an anti-alien Senator, arrives in National City and is attacked by an alien. Kara saves Crane and brings her to the DEO, where Hank reveals to Alex that the alien is a White Martian, whose species wiped out the Green Martians, Hank's species. Kara finds out that the Crane inside the DEO is actually the White, who is a shapeshifter. The White escapes, abducting Alex. Hank proposes a trade of himself with Alex, which the White accepts. Kara interrupts the exchange, giving Hank the chance to attempt to kill the White, but Kara dissuades him and the White is incarcerated in the DEO. Crane withdraws from her anti-alien initiative. Meanwhile, Kara and Winn become distant to each other. Adam pays a visit to Cat due to receiving a letter, which was actually written by Kara. Adam and Cat find it hard to develop a relationship, but Kara later helps them reconcile. Adam asks Kara on a date, which she accepts. An identical Supergirl appears in National City.
12	12	"Bizarro"	John Showalter	Roberto Aguirre-Sacasa & Rachel Shukert	February 1, 2016	4X7612	6.68
It is revealed that the new Supergirl is the woman Maxwell has been experimenting on and has brainwashed her with the sole purpose of killing the prime Supergirl. Cat titles her "Bizarro", who later witnesses Supergirl saving civilians and realizing that Supergirl is not a bad person, as Maxwell has dictated to her. However, Maxwell convinces her to continue hunting Supergirl. Bizarro attacks Kara when she is out with Adam, making her realize that Maxwell knows her identity. The DEO uses Kryptonite on Bizarro, whose face gets deformed instead and manages to escape. Kara decides to end her relationship with Adam. Maxwell advises Bizarro to use a person Supergirl cares about, so she kidnaps James. Kara arrives and engages her before Alex uses a modified Kryptonite to weaken Bizarro, who is rendered unconscious and kept in the DEO. Alex brings Maxwell to the DEO and locks him up, so he threatens Eliza indirectly. Back at her apartment, Kara is attacked by an unknown creature.
13	13	"For the Girl Who Has Everything"	Dermott Downs	Story by : Andrew Kreisberg; Teleplay by : Ted Sullivan & Derek Simon	February 8, 2016	4X7613	7.92
The creature, which is known as the Black Mercy, places Kara in a dreamlike state that has her imagining she is back on Krypton. The Black Mercy is part of a plot by Non, who is using Earth's technology to launch "Myriad", which he and Astra are planning to use to wipe out humanity. Astra secretly informs Alex of the Black Mercy, and the latter enlists the help of Hank, Winn, Maxwell, and James to save Kara, with Alex entering Kara's mind to pull her out and bring her back to reality. When Kara comes back, she seeks revenge on Non and stops him, who escapes with after revealing the word "Myriad". Elsewhere, Astra engages Alex and Hank, who fights as the Martian Manhunter. The former overpowers him before Alex impales her with a Kryptonite sword, killing her. Kara arrives and Hank tells her that he killed Astra instead of Alex, who starts to feel guilty over whether she should tell Kara the truth. Non vows revenge on Kara in the wake of Astra's death.
14	14	"Truth, Justice and the American Way"	Lexi Alexander	Story by : Michael Grassi; Teleplay by : Yahlin Chang & Caitlin Parrish	February 22, 2016	4X7614	7.25
Kara and Non pay their final respects to Astra, and he vows to kill her after he finishes mourning. Kara, Alex, and J'onn track down an armored alien known as the Master Jailer, whom they discover was a guard at Fort Rozz. He has become a vigilante who kills the alien fugitives, including those convicted of non-violent crimes such as a professor sentenced for drug smuggling. Kara confronts the Jailer, but he takes her prisoner and plans to execute her for not joining him. The DEO pinpoints their location and Kara is able to save the professor and defeat the Jailer. Alura refuses to reveal anything about Myriad and Kara realizes she cannot forgive J'onn for killing Astra. Meanwhile, Cat assigns James and Lucy to investigate Maxwell's disappearance. Tensions between James and Lucy develop after he reveals his knowledge of the DEO and friendship with Supergirl. The DEO releases Maxwell, threatening to disclose his criminal activity if he reveals Supergirl's identity or the DEO's location. Kara finds competition in Cat's new "first assistant" Siobhan Smythe.
15	15	"Solitude"	Dermott Downs	Story by : Rachel Shukert; Teleplay by : Anna Musky-Goldwyn & James DeWille	February 29, 2016	4X7615	6.69
A hacker steals the personal information of several people and gives it to Cat for disclosure, which she refuses. The hacker, turned out to be an alien named Indigo with the ability to use the internet for traveling, announces her decision to destroy National City. Kara leaves the DEO and enlists the help of James and Lucy to stop Indigo while the DEO enlists Winn for it. Lucy realizes that Indigo's intention in the hacking was only one person, a military general with access to the nuclear arsenal. Indigo infiltrates the nuclear base using the general's cell phone and launches a missile towards National City. Kara stops it using the DEO's help. Winn uploads a virus to Indigo, destroying her after she reveals to Kara that it was she who helped Kara's ship exit the Phantom Zone, which in turn facilitated Fort Rozz's expulsion. Kara decides to rejoin the DEO, and Alex reveals the truth about Astra, being forgiven by Kara. Lucy ends her relationship with James, accusing him of loving Kara. Winn and Siobhan develop a relationship. Non recovers Indigo's pieces and revives her.
16	16	"Falling"	Larry Teng	Robert Rovner & Jessica Queller	March 14, 2016	4X7616	6.53
After helping fight a warehouse fire, Supergirl inadvertently comes into contact with Red Kryptonite which overrides her inhibitions. Kara/Supergirl soon becomes more cold, shallow, and cynical which causes Winn, James, Alex, and even Cat to wonder what is going on with her. Kara even goes so far as to rat out the back-stabbing Siobhan by leaking information that Siobhan has been contacting the Daily Planet for information on Supergirl's actions, which results in Cat firing Siobhan and denying her a job at the Daily Planet. It soon turns out that Maxwell Lord created the so-called Red Kryptonite, in the hopes of stopping Non's next attack. After the compromised Supergirl makes an attempt on Cat's life, Cat goes on TV and denounces Supergirl. Alex and Maxwell are forced to form an uneasy alliance while he tries to help the DEO stop Supergirl. After a climactic battle downtown, the DEO is able to subdue and cure Supergirl, but at the price of Hank revealing himself as the Martian Manhunter.
17	17	"Manhunter"	Chris Fisher	Story by : Derek Simon; Teleplay by : Cindy Lichtman & Rachel Shukert	March 21, 2016	4X7617	6.00
While Kara is trying to win back National City's trust, the hot-headed Marine Colonel James Harper (guest star Eddie McClintock) begins an investigation into the J'onn affair with Lucy, having re-enlisted into the Army at her previous rank of Major, as his legal assistant. Hank/J'onn J'onzz then tells the backstory about how he first met Jeremiah Danvers (guest star Dean Cain) 10 years earlier while he and Hank were on a mission in South America to find him and how J'onn took his identity to oversee the DEO. After her interrogation, the vindictive Lucy implicates Alex with her knowledge about J'onn's real identity. After learning that Hank and Alex are on their way to Project Cadmus, Kara finally tells Lucy that she is Supergirl and convinces her to help rescue Hank and Alex. Hank learns that Jeremiah is still alive, so he and Alex go on the run to find him, but not before manipulating Harper into resigning from the Marines and appointing Lucy as the acting director of the DEO. Meanwhile, Siobhan tries to get revenge on Kara for getting her fired, but gets caught by Winn and discovers that she has the power to sonic scream.
18	18	"Worlds Finest"	Nick Gomez	Story by : Greg Berlanti; Teleplay by : Andrew Kreisberg & Michael Grassi	March 28, 2016	4X7618	7.17
Siobhan discovers that the women in her family are cursed with the spirit of a banshee, which can only be quieted by killing whoever wronged them. Deciding to kill Kara, Siobhan frees Livewire from captivity at the DEO and suggests they team up to kill both Kara and Cat. Siobhan—now calling herself Silver Banshee—and Livewire kidnap Cat and wreak havoc on National City Park. Meanwhile, Supergirl has a run-in with Barry Allen / Flash, a superhero from a parallel universe, whom she asks for his help to find Livewire and Silver Banshee. After a climactic fight in a downtown park, Kara is able to subdue them and win back National City's trust. Later when Kara decides to reveal her romantic feelings for James, she discovers that he and everyone in National City has fallen under some kind of spell, revealed by Non to be the result of Myriad. Note: This episode is a crossover with The Flash season 2 episode 18.
19	19	"Myriad"	Adam Kane	Yahlin Chang & Caitlin Parrish	April 11, 2016	4X7619	6.12
The Myriad effect has taken over National City and even Superman is under control due to his human upbringing leaving him susceptible to the signal, leaving Kara, Cat, and Maxwell as the only ones immune, as Max had devised a means of blocking the signal that he gave to Cat. Now, Kara must find a way to stop Non, but Maxwell is looking at destroying the Kryptonians with a Kryptonite bomb even at the risk of killing other humans. Cat objects and prompts Kara to find an alternative. The effect brings fugitives Alex and J'onn back after Alex tells Eliza the truth about Jeremiah and Hank Henshaw. When Indigo senses the two returning, she defeats J'onn, but takes Alex and places her under mind control as Non's payback for Astra's death.
20	20	"Better Angels"	Larry Teng	Story by : Andrew Kreisberg & Ali Adler; Teleplay by : Robert Rovner & Jessica Queller	April 18, 2016	4X7620	6.11
Kara fights with Alex, who is controlled by Non. Eliza pleads with Alex to stop, as Alex is about to kill Kara with the Kryptonite sword, which breaks Non's control over her. The team learns that hope is the key to stopping Myriad. Supergirl inspires the citizens of National City, waking them from the Myriad trance. However, Indigo convinces Non to kill all the humans on Earth by increasing Myriad's frequency. Max warns Kara that she might not survive a solo fight with Non and Indigo; J'onn later insists on helping her. Kara and J'onn confront Non and Indigo at Fort Rozz, which is powering Myriad. Kara defeats Non in a heat vision battle and J'onn rips Indigo's body apart. As Indigo dies, she reveals that she locked the system so Myriad cannot be shut down. Kara flies Fort Rozz into space, rendering Myriad harmless; Alex rescues her using Kara's pod. Afterward, J'onn is reinstated as the Director of the DEO and Cat gives Kara a promotion. While Kara celebrates at her house, a pod (similar to Kara's) crashes near National City. Kara opens the pod and is shocked by what is inside it.

== Cast and characters ==
=== Main ===
- Melissa Benoist as Kara Zor-El / Kara Danvers / Supergirl
- Mehcad Brooks as James Olsen
- Chyler Leigh as Alex Danvers
- Jeremy Jordan as Winslow "Winn" Schott Jr.
- David Harewood as J'onn J'onzz / Martian Manhunter and Hank Henshaw
- Calista Flockhart as Cat Grant

=== Recurring ===
- Laura Benanti as Astra In-Ze and Alura Zor-El
- Dean Cain as Jeremiah Danvers
- Jenna Dewan-Tatum as Lucy Lane
- Peter Facinelli as Maxwell Lord
- Brit Morgan as Leslie Willis / Livewire
- Glenn Morshower as Sam Lane
- Italia Ricci as Siobhan Smythe / Silver Banshee
- Helen Slater as Eliza Danvers
- Chris Vance as Non
- Laura Vandervoort as Indigo
- Briana Venskus as Vasquez

=== Guest ===
- Jeff Branson as Detective Draper / Master Jailer
- Chris Browning as Ben Krull / Reactron
- Joan Juliet Buck as Katherine Grant
- Emma Caulfield as Cameron Chase
- Tawny Cypress as Miranda Crane
- Henry Czerny as Winslow Schott, Sr. / Toyman
- Daniel DiMaggio as young Kal-El
- Robert Gant as Zor-El
- Iddo Goldberg as T. O. Morrow and Red Tornado
- Grant Gustin as Barry Allen / Flash
- Charles Halford as Jemm
- Blake Jenner as Adam Foster
- Hope Lauren as Bizarro
- Justice Leak as Hellgrammite
- Eddie McClintock as James Harper
- Levi Miller as Carter Grant
- Faran Tahir as The Commander
- Eve Torres Gracie as Maxima
- Owain Yeoman as Vartox

The hosts of The Talk, Sara Gilbert, Julie Chen, Sharon Osbourne, Aisha Tyler and Sheryl Underwood, cameo as themselves.

== Production ==
=== Development ===
By September 2014, Warner Bros. Television was looking to create a television series centered around Kara Zor-El / Supergirl. Executive producers for the series include Greg Berlanti (also a creator/producer for Arrow and The Flash), Ali Adler, who were both writing the script, and Berlanti Productions' Sarah Schechter. DC Comics' Geoff Johns was also expected to be part of the project. Titles under consideration for the series included Super and Girl. Berlanti confirmed the show shortly after, and stated it was in development and had yet to be pitched to networks. On September 20, it was announced that CBS had landed Supergirl with a series commitment, with an expected premiere in 2015 of the 2015–16 television season.

The show was officially picked up to series on May 6, 2015. On November 30, 2015, CBS ordered an additional seven episodes of Supergirl, for a full season of 20 episodes.

=== Writing ===
In January 2015, CBS Entertainment chairwoman Nina Tassler revealed the show would be a procedural, saying, "There will be [crime] cases, but what [executive producers] Ali Adler and Greg Berlanti pitched was a real series arc for her. The beauty of it is now with shows like The Good Wife and Madam Secretary, you can have serialized story elements woven into a case of the week. She's a crime solver, so she's going to have to solve a crime." In July 2015, Adler spoke on how much influence Superman would have on the show, saying, "Our prototype is the way the president is seen on Veep. It's certainly [inspired by] so much of what Julia Louis-Dreyfus' character goes through. Ultimately, this is a show about Supergirl and we really want to see it through her lens."

=== Casting ===
For the role of Kara Zor-El / Supergirl, the producers wanted a Caucasian actress aged between 22 and 26 years. In January 2015, it was announced by The Hollywood Reporter that Melissa Benoist would star as the character. Benoist later revealed that auditioning for the part "was a long, drawn-out, three-month process"; she was the first actress looked at for the role, although Claire Holt and Gemma Atkinson were also considered. In the same month, Mehcad Brooks was cast as James Olsen, based on the character Jimmy Olsen. Unlike the comics, where the same character is portrayed as a Caucasian and goes by "Jimmy", this version is African-American and goes by "James". Brooks described this as a form of "intermixing of races", differing from the 1940s where "white things were white, black things were black. Latino things were Latino". In February, Chyler Leigh was cast as Alex Danvers, an original creation for the series. In the same month, David Harewood and Calista Flockhart were cast as Hank Henshaw and Cat Grant, respectively. It was eventually revealed that Harewood's character was actually J'onn J'onzz / Martian Manhunter impersonating Henshaw. In March, Jeremy Jordan was cast as Winslow "Winn" Schott. The character was written for the series as the son of Winslow Schott / Toyman, unlike the comics where Toyman's son is Anton Schott.

=== Filming ===
In February 2015, it was announced that Andrew Kreisberg, co-creator of Arrow and The Flash, had joined the series as a writer and executive producer; and Arrow / The Flash and Smallville alum Glen Winter was announced to be directing the pilot. Principal photography for the pilot took place from March 4 to March 29, 2015. Filming locations included the Warner Bros. lot, where Lois and Clark was shot. Each episode cost approximately $3 million to broadcast, which is one of the highest license fees ever for a first year show. Filming wrapped in March 2016.

=== Music ===
The score for the season was composed by Blake Neely.

Track listing
No.	Title	Length
1.	"You Will Do Extraordinary Things"	4:49
2.	"Meeting Jimmy"	2:08
3.	"A Hero Emerges"	3:14
4.	"Telling Winn"	1:21
5.	"Fighting Vartox"	3:27
6.	"Gift from Clark / Stronger Together"	3:00
7.	"Fight or Flight"	4:22
8.	"Interview Granted"	3:27
9.	"Assistant Problems"	1:51
10.	"Chatting with Clark"	2:13
11.	"I Came Here to Save the World"	3:12
12.	"Confronting Maxwell Lord"	3:05
13.	"Strange Visitors from Other Planets"	3:11
14.	"Joy Ride"	1:20
15.	"How Does She Do It?"	1:50
16.	"Harnessing Anger"	2:04
17.	"Inspirational Boss"	1:13
18.	"My Name Is Jonn Jonzz"	2:19
19.	"Under Attack"	2:47
20.	"Catty Questions"	1:55
21.	"Heroes Find a Way"	2:25
22.	"Dying Is Easier"	2:47
23.	"Alex Brings Kara Back"	3:30
24.	"Fortress of Solitude"	3:27
25.	"Afraid of Losing You"	1:58
26.	"Martian Manhunter Revealed / Your Father is Alive"	3:52
27.	"World's Finest"	2:10
28.	"Hope Speech / Lifting Fort Roz"	4:19
29.	"Theme from Supergirl"	1:13
Total length:		1:18:38

== Release ==
=== Broadcast ===
The season began airing on CBS on October 26, 2015, and ended on April 18, 2016. The season premiered on October 29, 2015, in the United Kingdom on Sky One. The series premiered in Australia on December 6, 2015, on FOX8. In Canada, Supergirl aired in a sim-subbed simulcast on Global with the American broadcast in the season.

=== Home media ===
Home media releases of Supergirl, season 1
Supergirl: The Complete First Season
Set details	Special features	
20 episodes; 5-disc DVD set/3-disc Blu-ray set; English (Dolby Digital 5.1 Surround); English SDH, Spanish and French subtitles; Subtitles: English	2015 Comic-Con Panel; Deleted Scenes; Gag Reel; Featurettes; The Man From Mars; Krypton: A World Left Behind	
DVD release dates
Region 1	Region 2	Region 4
August 9, 2016	July 25, 2016	July 27, 2016

== Reception ==
=== Ratings ===
Viewership and ratings per episode of Supergirl season 1
No.	Title	Air date	Rating/share (18–49)	Viewers (millions)	DVR (18–49)	DVR viewers (millions)	Total (18–49)	Total viewers (millions)
1	"Pilot"	October 26, 2015	3.1/9	12.96	1.3	3.97	4.4	16.92
2	"Stronger Together"	November 2, 2015	2.2/7	8.87	1.0	3.33	3.2	12.20
3	"Fight or Flight"	November 9, 2015	1.7/5	8.07	1.0	2.83	2.7	10.90
4	"How Does She Do It?"	November 23, 2015	1.5/5	7.19	0.8	2.26	2.3	9.45
5	"Livewire"	November 16, 2015	1.8/6	7.77	0.8	—N/a	2.6	—N/a
6	"Red Faced"	November 30, 2015	1.6/5	8.02	0.8	2.49	2.4	10.51
7	"Human for a Day"	December 7, 2015	1.5/5	7.67	0.9	2.32	2.4	9.98
8	"Hostile Takeover"	December 14, 2015	1.5/5	7.28	0.8	2.27	2.3	9.55
9	"Blood Bonds"	January 4, 2016	1.9/6	8.75	0.7	—N/a	2.6	—N/a
10	"Childish Things"	January 18, 2016	1.8/6	8.77	0.8	2.18	2.6	10.95
11	"Strange Visitor from Another Planet"	January 25, 2016	1.8/5	7.90	0.7	2.21	2.5	10.11
12	"Bizarro"	February 1, 2016	1.5/5	6.68	0.8	2.18	2.3	8.83
13	"For the Girl Who Has Everything"	February 8, 2016	1.8/6	7.92	—N/a	—N/a	—N/a	—N/a
14	"Truth, Justice and the American Way"	February 22, 2016	1.5/5	7.25	—N/a	—N/a	—N/a	—N/a
15	"Solitude"	February 29, 2016	1.4/5	6.69	0.7	2.16	2.1	8.85
16	"Falling"	March 14, 2016	1.3/4	6.53	0.7	—N/a	2.0	—N/a
17	"Manhunter"	March 21, 2016	1.3/4	6.00	0.7	2.07	2.0	8.07
18	"Worlds Finest"	March 28, 2016	1.7/6	7.17	0.8	2.47	2.5	9.63
19	"Myriad"	April 11, 2016	1.3/5	6.12	0.7	2.04	2.0	8.16
20	"Better Angels"	April 18, 2016	1.3/4	6.11	—N/a	—N/a	—N/a	—N/a

=== Critical response ===
The review aggregator website Rotten Tomatoes reported a 92% approval rating with an average rating of 7.53/10 based on 371 reviews. The website's consensus reads, "Melissa Benoist shines as Superman's plucky little cousin in Supergirl, a family-friendly comic-book adaptation that ditches cynicism for heart." Metacritic, which uses a weighted average, assigned a score of 75 out of 100 based on 33 reviews, indicating "generally favorable" reviews. Max Nicholson of IGN gave the season a score of 7.3 out of 10, along with the verdict, "While Supergirl's first season disappointed in several key areas -- namely its villains and romantic subplots -- Supergirl herself was spot-on, and the story offered several surprising twists (e.g., Hank Henshaw as J'onn J'onzz). Yes, not all episodes were winners, but when the series flew, it soared, especially in terms of emotional impact." Reviewing the season as a whole, Colin Campbell of Polygon criticized the costumes, fight sequences, the ludicrous villains, the predictable nature of the plot, and felt that the title character was not "Super enough", but noted that "unless your interest is in seeing yet another comic-book franchise transferred reverently to the screen they're of only marginal concern." Evan Valentine of Collider ranked Supergirl eighth in his list of the worst and best superhero television series of 2015 and wrote, "Aside from presenting the best Supergirl we've seen in live action with Melissa Benoist [...] it managed to capture a sense of fun among the cast that was infectious."

=== Accolades ===
Award nominations for Supergirl, season 1
Year	Award	Category	Nominee(s)	Result	Ref.
2015	Critics' Choice Television Awards	Most Exciting New Series	Supergirl	Won	
2016	People's Choice Awards	Favorite New TV Drama	Supergirl	Won	
2016	Teen Choice Awards	Breakout Series	Supergirl	Nominated	
2016	Saturn Awards	Best Actress on Television	Melissa Benoist	Nominated	
2016	Saturn Awards	Best Guest Starring Role on Television	Laura Benanti	Nominated	
2016	Saturn Awards	Best Superhero Adaptation Television Series	Supergirl	Nominated	
2016	Saturn Awards	Best Supporting Actress on Television	Calista Flockhart	Nominated	
2016	Saturn Awards	Breakthrough Performance	Melissa Benoist	Won	
