= It's a Super Life =

- Supergirl episode
- Episode no.: Season 5 Episode 13
- Directed by: Jesse Warn
- Story by: Robert Rovner; Jessica Queller
- Teleplay by: Derek Simon; Nicki Holcomb
- Production code: T13.21813
- Original air date: February 23, 2020

Guest appearances
- Chris Wood as Mon-El (special guest star); Odette Annable as Samantha Arias / Reign (special guest star); Sam Witwer as Ben Lockwood / Agent Liberty (special guest star); Jeremy Jordan as Winn Schott (special guest star); Betty Buckley as Patricia Arias; Robert Baker as Otis Graves; Chad Lowe as Thomas Coville; Thomas Lennon as Mxyzptlk

Episode chronology
← Previous "Back From the Future – Part Two"	Next → "The Bodyguard"
- Supergirl (season 5)

"It's a Super Life" is the thirteenth episode of the fifth season of the American television series Supergirl, based on the DC Comics character Kara Zor-El / Supergirl. It is set in the Arrowverse, sharing continuity with the other television series of the universe. The episode was written by Derek Simon and Nicki Holcomb from a story by showrunners Robert Rovner and Jessica Queller, directed by Jesse Warn, and is the series' 100th episode.

Melissa Benoist stars as Kara, and is joined by principal cast members Chyler Leigh, Katie McGrath, Jesse Rath, Nicole Maines, Azie Tesfai and David Harewood. The episode sees Kara travelling back to various points in time with Mxyzptlk's help to find a way to repair her relationship with Lena Luthor. Several former series regulars make guest appearances, including Chris Wood, Jeremy Jordan, Sam Witwer and Odette Annable.

"It's a Super Life" premiered on February 23, 2020, on The CW, and was watched by 0.66 million viewers with a 0.2 share among adults aged 18 to 49. The episode received generally positive reviews from critics.

== Plot ==
Mxyzptlk approaches Kara Danvers to make amends for past transgressions (Note: As depicted in the season two episode "Mr. & Mrs. Mxyzptlk".) and to give her a proposition: travel back in time and tell Lena Luthor she is Supergirl before Lex Luthor can, (Note: As depicted in the season four episode "The Quest for Peace".) and ensure their friendship turns out differently; the changes will be cemented if Kara likes the outcome. He also explains that his previous appearance was a form that he took to impress her. Kara takes the offer after Alex Danvers and J'onn J'onzz give their approval.

Kara first travels to the time before Kryptonite was released into the atmosphere (Note: As depicted in the season four episode "Fallout".) and tells Lena, but this results in a timeline where Kara dies once the Kryptonite is released as Lena was not around to help cure her. This reality is undone. Kara next tells Lena when she told her to come clean about creating Kryptonite, (Note: As depicted in the season three episode "Trinity".) but this results in a timeline where Reign survives longer than she originally did and kills Mon-El and Lena. Next, Kara tells Lena soon after the latter moved to National City. (Note: As depicted in the season two episode "The Adventures of Supergirl".) Everything goes well until Ben Lockwood and the Children of Liberty blackmail Kara into revealing herself as Supergirl to the world by kidnapping Lena before killing Kara's friends and family. This was done in retaliation to his family trying to put themselves in danger so that Supergirl would rescue them.

Following this, Mxyzptlk shows Kara a reality in which she and Lena did not meet, but his powers stop working, leaving them stranded. Nia Nal saves them from a Hope-Bot and brings them to Alex, J'onn, Winn Schott, Mon-El and Kelly Olsen. In this reality, Lena fought off Lex's assassination attempt on her and took him out at the cost of half of National City. She started using the Fifth Dimension to harness power for her Hope-Bots while getting Reign and a reprogrammed Brainiac 5 on her side. While her allies fight Reign and Brainiac 5, Supergirl confronts Lena while Mxyzptlk goes to look for a hat that was taken from him by Hat. Once he gets it, he undoes the reality.

Unable to change the timeline without adverse consequences, Kara decides to confront Lena as Mxyzptlk takes his leave while leaving a video about the day Lena and Lex started working together. Kara tells Lena that if she decides to forgive her, then she will be there for her, but if Lena continues to help in furthering Lex's plot, she will be forced to take action against Lena.

== Production ==
=== Development ===
In February 2020, it was announced that the thirteenth episode of the fifth season of Supergirl would be titled "It's a Super Life". The episode, which is the series' 100th, was directed by Jesse Warn, and written by Derek Simon & Nicki Holcomb from a story by showrunners Robert Rovner & Jessica Queller. This made Supergirl the first female-led superhero TV series to hit the 100-episode mark.

=== Writing ===
In July 2019, Queller teased the series' 100th episode by saying "Characters may reappear" while Rovner said it "serves the show's past". The episode is largely influenced by the 1946 film It's a Wonderful Life. Jeremy Jordan, who portrays Winn Schott, described the episode as "a love letter to our fans for always supporting us [...] We get to revisit some of these great moments we've had over the course of the series and make some fun new memories. What's great about the 100th episode is it really feels like the end of a chapter and we can move forward from here." The showrunners looked at the 100th episodes of Arrow and The Flash as a "template on what other shows had done", and wanted to make this episode "special and kind of be a look back at the best...some of the moments that we've done, but also to be able to kind of bring Kara forward in her journey this season."

=== Casting ===
Main cast members Melissa Benoist, Chyler Leigh, Katie McGrath, Jesse Rath, Nicole Maines, Azie Tesfai and David Harewood appear as Kara Danvers / Supergirl, Alex Danvers, Lena Luthor, Brainiac 5, Nia Nal / Dreamer, Kelly Olsen, and J'onn J'onzz / Martian Manhunter respectively. Former regulars Chris Wood, Jeremy Jordan, Sam Witwer and Odette Annable guest star as Mon-El, Winn Schott, Ben Lockwood / Agent Liberty and Samantha Arias / Reign respectively. Additional guest stars include Betty Buckley as Patricia Arias, Robert Baker as Otis Graves, Chad Lowe as Thomas Coville, and Thomas Lennon as Mxyzptlk, previously portrayed by Peter Gadiot in season two. Despite being credited, Andrea Brooks does not appear as Eve Teschmacher. The showrunners wanted former regulars Mehcad Brooks and Calista Flockhart to guest star as James Olsen and Cat Grant respectively, but the actors could not appear due to scheduling conflicts; Brooks instead appears as his character via archive footage, and Flockhart through a photograph, with Rovner explaining, "even without them being available, we wanted to make sure that they were a part of the episode".

=== Filming ===
Filming for the episode began in early December, and ended in the middle of the month.

== Release ==
"It's a Super Life" premiered in the United States on The CW on February 23, 2020.

== Reception ==
=== Ratings ===
The episode was watched by 0.66 million viewers with a 0.2 share among adults aged 18 to 49.

=== Critical response ===
The review aggregator website Rotten Tomatoes reported a 100% approval rating for the episode, based on 8 reviews, with an average rating of 9/10. Caroline Siede of The A.V. Club called it "part clip show, part alternate universe adventure, and a whole lot of fun throughout." Chancellor Agard of Entertainment Weekly said, "Supergirl's 100th episode, may be one of the superhero drama's best episodes ever. The plot is mostly inconsequential (there aren't any major twists or big reveals), but that doesn't matter because this episode is 100 percent about character."
