= Alex Danvers =

Fictional character

- Arrowverse character
- Chyler Leigh as Alex Danvers in a promotional image for season one.
- First appearance: "Pilot"; Supergirl; October 26, 2015
- Last appearance: "Armageddon, Part 4"; The Flash; December 7, 2021
- Created by: Greg Berlanti; Ali Adler; Andrew Kreisberg
- Portrayed by: Chyler Leigh; Jordan Mazarati (young; 2003); Olivia Nikkanen (young; 2007 and 2009)

In-universe information
- Full name: Alexandra "Alex" Danvers
- Alias: Sentinel
- Title: Ph.D. M.D.
- Occupation: Bio-engineer, physician, scientist, field agent, director of the DEO
- Family: Eliza Danvers (mother); Jeremiah Danvers (father, deceased); Kara Danvers (adoptive sister)
- Significant other: Kelly Olsen (wife)
- Children: Esme (adoptive daughter)
- Abilities: Scientist, physician, tactician, and detective; Expert in human and extraterrestrial physiology; Master hand-to-hand combatant, martial artist, and markswoman; Proficiency with advanced DEO and extraterrestrial weaponry; Utilizes Kryptonite powered exosuit and sword

Alexandra "Alex" Danvers Ph.D. M.D., also known as Sentinel, is a fictional character from the Arrowverse television series Supergirl, portrayed by actress Chyler Leigh. Created by executive producers Greg Berlanti, Ali Adler, and Andrew Kreisberg, the character was introduced in the pilot episode as the elder adoptive sister of protagonist Kara Danvers / Supergirl. Alex is a bioengineer, physician, scientist and a field agent of the DEO, a secret government agency that works to protect the Earth from extraterrestrial threats. She later becomes the director of the organization at the end of season three, after having been J'onn's second-in-command for years, and remains so through season five. Alex is also featured in the show's digital tie-in comic book series, Adventures of Supergirl, as well as the 2017 four-part Arrowverse crossover event "Crisis on Earth-X", with Leigh reprising her role across The Flash, Arrow, and Legends of Tomorrow.

== Background ==
Alex Danvers is the only biological child of scientists Eliza and Jeremiah Danvers. When Alex was a teenager, her parents adopted an orphaned Kara Zor-El and they grew up together in the town of Midvale. Although Alex was an exceptional student, particularly in science, she couldn't help but envy her Kryptonian sister's alien abilities. Alex was relieved when Kara decided not to use her powers, but still felt embarrassed by her alien behavior. Nonetheless, as the older sister figure, Alex felt protective of Kara and sympathy for her losses and displacement.

At some point, Kara took a reluctant Alex flying through the night and they were spotted by the Department of Extranormal Operations (DEO), a secret government agency tasked with monitoring alien presence on Earth. Unbeknownst to the young girls, Jeremiah agreed to work for the organization under Hank Henshaw instead of letting them take Kara away.

In high school Alex had a best friend, Vicky Donahue. She enjoyed sleepovers with Vicky and developed feelings for her. Alex recognized her feelings; however, she got scared and was suddenly fighting with Vicky. This falling out was the reason why they never talked again.

Suffering the loss of her father and her suppressed homosexuality, among other factors, caused Alex to excessively drink and party as a young adult. Nonetheless, she managed to earn dual doctoral degrees (Ph.D. and M.D.) before being recruited into the DEO herself by Henshaw (later revealed to be J'onn J'onzz (who promised Jeremiah that he'd look after his daughters). In season three it is revealed that, at some point in the past, she was a practicing physician and worked at a hospital in Seattle.

== Storylines ==
=== Season 1 ===
At the start of the series, Kara is initially unaware of her sister's true occupation. Alex reveals herself to Kara as well as the existence of the DEO after Kara saves Alex from a near plane crash and decides to become a superhero like her cousin, Clark Kent / Superman. She is also Hank Henshaw's trusted right-hand operative. Alex is tasked with training Kara in combat and provides her with a Fortress of Solitude-esque room with a projection of Kara's mother, Alura. Alex, J'onn, and the rest of the DEO work alongside Kara, dubbed "Supergirl" by the press, to put away dangerous alien criminals who have escaped from the Fort Rozz prison spaceship, including Alura's identical twin and Kara's aunt, Astra. Alex puts on a suit with kryptonite lacing and fatally stabs Astra with a kryptonite sword. Jonn took the blame for Astra's death, because he didn't want Alex to lose her sister. However, Alex felt guilty and although she knew she could lose her sister with her confession, she told Kara, against Jonn's will, that she had killed Astra in self-defense, and not Jonn. She explained that she had no choice since Astra wanted to kill Jonn and apologized, crying bitterly to her. At first it looked like Kara was running away and couldn't forgive Alex, but she finally hugged and comforted her, showing that she had accepted her sister's apology.

=== Season 2 ===
While continuing her work at the DEO, Alex crosses paths with National City Science Police officer Detective Maggie Sawyer. The two initially come into conflict over work, but quickly form a flirtatious friendship and Alex begins to develop feelings for her. That forces Alex to again confront her homosexuality, and her true feelings that she suppressed since her youth. Again Alex denies that she is a lesbian, but after a long conversation with Maggie, she finally admits it to herself for the first time. Maggie therefore encourages her to stand by her sexual orientation and to tell her family. After a few days Alex finally gathers up all her courage and manages to come out to Kara. Her sister is at first a bit shocked about it, but has absolutely no problem with this and has been supporting her ever since, just like her mother and friends who were told about it after Kara. So Alex comes out as gay at the age of 28 and enters into a relationship with Maggie. During the episode "Alex", Kara and Maggie work together to locate a kidnapped Alex. At the episode's conclusion, Kara destroys the tank designed to drown Alex. Alex and Maggie profess their love for each other, and they become engaged in the season finale. Alex also learns of her father Jeremiah's mysterious survival and ambiguous partnership with the anti-alien organization Project Cadmus.

=== Season 3 ===
As Alex and Maggie prepare to get married, Alex discovers that Maggie does not ever want kids. Alex, realizing that she does want kids someday, breaks up with Maggie and they reluctantly go their separate ways. In the aftermath of the breakup, Kara invites Alex to her friend Barry Allen's wedding on Earth-1, where she ends up having a one-night stand with Legends of Tomorrow's Sara Lance (Caity Lotz), both are soon forced to fight off an invasion of Nazis from a parallel Earth together. After the defeat of Reign, J'onn steps down and promotes Alex to Director of the DEO.

=== Season 4 ===
Following her promotion to director of the DEO, Alex struggles with her new role, and her organization deals with a new wave of anti-extraterrestrial bigotry within the country. United States Marine Corps colonel Lauren Haley is brought in by the president to supervise Alex, and is determined to discover Supergirl's civilian identity. To protect Kara from Haley, Alex has J'onn wipe her memory of her knowing that her sister is Supergirl. Alex continues to maintain a cordial relationship with Kara, but becomes hostile towards Supergirl, not knowing they are the same person. Alex remembers that Kara is Supergirl, and manages to revive her when she is nearly killed by Red Daughter. Following the defeat of Lex Luthor, who had been orchestrating all the anti-extraterrestrial bigotry, Alex develops a romantic relationship with Kelly Olsen.

=== Season 5 ===
In season 5, Alex assists in the investigation of Leviathan. Following the Crisis which led to the creation of Earth-Prime, Alex is now the director of the DEO, which is now owned by LuthorCorp. She was surprised at that when J'onn restored her memories. Alex later resigns from the DEO, unable to face her superior Luthor, resulting in Querl Dox succeeding her as director. After receiving news that her father died, Alex is reluctant to attend his funeral and uses the Obsidian lens to do a Supergirl fantasy that starts to affect her alongside the others that indulge in it. With help from Obsidian CEO Andrea Rojas, Kelly is able to get Alex out using a VR version of her younger self. Afterwards, Alex goes to Midvale to attend her father's funeral. When it comes to fighting Rama Khan, Tezumak, and Sela, Alex starts wearing a new suit provided to her by J'onn to help fight Leviathan.

=== Season 6 ===
In season six, Alex assists in the fight of Lex Luthor. While advised by Lena Luthor to inform Kelly about Supergirl's identity, Alex is persuaded by J'onn to take on the Sentinel alias. After the defeat of Lex and Nyxlygsptlnz, Alex and Kelly got married.

=== Other appearances ===
In The Flash episode "Armageddon, Part 2", Alex informs Team Flash that they have no information on Despero. Following Xotar's arrest and the attack on Flash who has no memory of Joe West's death, Alex receives the information they learned about Despero which is now in her files. She also mentions to the rest of Team Flash that Kara and J'onn cannot help them as they are "offworld".

== Other versions ==
In season 4, John Deegan, a mad psychiatrist who works at Earth-1's Arkham Asylum, uses the Book of Destiny to rewrite reality on his Earth; in this new reality, Alex's Earth-1 counterpart is working for him. This Alex is intrigued to learn of her Earth-38 counterpart's life after Kara reveals herself as the adoptive sister of her Earth's Alex. She helps Kara escape from Deegan and this reality is undone by the combined efforts of Kara, Oliver Queen, Barry Allen, and Clark Kent.

In season 8 of The Flash, a Reverse-Flashpoint version of Alex Danvers appears. She was to be a guest at the wedding of Eobard Thawne and Iris West. Alex did talk to Allegra Garcia and Chester P. Runk about their failed relationship which they noted after a disastrous fight with the Legion of Doom. As Barry Allen works to undo the Reverse-Flashpoint at the cost of the Armageddon that Despero foresaw, Sentinel and Ryan Choi as Atom helped Frost and Chillblaine defeat Damien Darhk.

== Concept and creation ==
In February 2015, actress Chyler Leigh was cast as Alexandra "Alex" Danvers, initially described as Kara's "confident foster sister whose fascination with her sibling's powers inspired her to become a doctor." The character is an original creation for Supergirl, not based on any existing character appearing in DC Comics. Jordan Mazarati portrayed the 2003 version of the character, and Olivia Nikkanen portrayed the 2007 version.

== Skills and abilities ==
Alex Danvers has no inherent superhuman powers; rather, she is highly intelligent, trained in various forms of martial arts, and has been shown to capably wield any weapon. She is also an excellent physician and bio-engineer, and has furthermore extensive expertise in marksmanship, hand-to-hand combat, and extraterrestrial physiology, besides being a far-reaching skilled scientist and military tactician. During season 3, Alex is given a new protective suit by Winn Schott. This one is more armor-like than her usual DEO suit and offers more protection for the body than the other one before. In addition to that, she has magnetic gloves now which allow her to retrieve any dropped weapon, and her Maaldorian laser pistol that she has taken away from a deceased alien during a rescue mission on Maaldoria was also upgraded and can shoot Kryptonite bullets now.

== Reception ==
Both the character and Leigh's performance have been well received by critics and fans alike. The relationship between the Danvers sisters and Alex's coming out storyline in the second season have garnered particular praise.

Kara and Alex were named as one of "The 10 Greatest Ride or Die TV Siblings" by TV Guide's Keisha Hatchett, who stated: "These two might not come from the same species, but their unconditional love for each other proves that you don't need to share the same blood in order to be sisters. Both have helped each other through a difficult journey to self-acceptance [...] in a fierce display of sisterhood that keeps us coming back each week."

Estelle Tang of Elle described Alex's coming-out journey as "nuanced, remarkably moving, and believable reckoning of an adult woman coming to terms with something she had never consciously known about herself." Supergirl received a nomination for Outstanding Drama Series at the 2017 GLAAD Awards, which recognizes LGBT representation in the media.
