= Pilot (Supergirl) =

- Supergirl episode
- Episode no.: Season 1 Episode 1
- Directed by: Glen Winter
- Story by: Greg Berlanti; Ali Adler; Andrew Kreisberg
- Teleplay by: Ali Adler
- Production code: 276088
- Original air date: October 26, 2015

Guest appearances
- Dean Cain as Dr. Jeremiah Danvers (special guest star); Laura Benanti as Alura Zor-El / Astra In-Ze (special guest star); Helen Slater as Eliza Danvers (special guest star); Owain Yeoman as Vartox; Faran Tahir as The Commander; Ben Begley as Tobey; Robert Gant as Zor-El; Derek Mio as Hayashi; Malina Weissman as Young Kara Zor-El

Episode chronology
← Previous —	Next → "Stronger Together"
- Supergirl (season 1)

"Pilot" is the first episode of the American superhero television series Supergirl. It premiered on CBS on October 26, 2015. The episode was written by series developers/creators Greg Berlanti, Ali Adler and Andrew Kreisberg, and directed by Glen Winter.

The Supergirl pilot details the origins of Kryptonian Kara Zor-El, whose quest to follow in her famous cousin's footsteps would emerge while maintaining a mild mannered life as Kara Danvers.

The episode received positive reviews, especially for the performance of the series' star Melissa Benoist. It also became CBS' most watched new series of the 2015-16 television season, and the most watched new scripted series overall by Nielsen, with 12.9 million viewers tuning in and an estimated 19 million over the next week, once delayed viewing is tabulated. It also gave CBS its first successful series to target a younger demo in the 18-49 age group, which is favored by advertiser groups.

== Plot ==
Kara Zor-El is sent by her parents, Alura and Zor-El, from Krypton to Earth to watch over her infant cousin, Kal-El. Krypton explodes, knocking Kara's pod off-course into the Phantom Zone. She remains frozen in time for 24 years before her pod crashes to Earth. Kal-El, now Superman, rescues Kara and takes her to live with Eliza and Jeremiah Danvers, the scientists who helped him come into his powers, and their daughter Alex.

Twelve years later in National City, Kara Danvers is an assistant to Cat Grant, the head of mega-media conglomerate CatCo. About to board a flight to Geneva, Alex believes Kara should remain normal, despite Kara's yearning to use her powers. After a news report reveals Alex's plane is about to crash, Kara uses her powers for the first time in years, saving the plane. As Kara wonders if she could become a hero like her cousin, Alex worries Kara is putting herself in danger. Kara reveals her secret to co-worker Winn Schott, who helps Kara perfect her abilities and designs her a uniform. As a public hero, Kara is dubbed "Supergirl" by Cat Grant, unaware of her true identity. Vartox, the alien responsible for the attempted plane crash, learns of Supergirl's actions.

Kara is tranquilized and brought to the secret headquarters of the Department of Extra-Normal Operations (DEO), where Alex is revealed to work. Director Hank Henshaw informs Kara that when she landed on Earth, Fort Rozz – a prison housing some of Krypton's worst criminals, most of whom were sentenced by Kara's mother – crashed onto Earth as well. Nearly killed by Vartox, Kara worries she is not yet ready to be Supergirl, but Alex convinces her to follow in Superman's footsteps. Challenging Vartox to a rematch, Kara causes his axe to explode with her heat vision before he commits suicide. Her actions convince Hank that Supergirl, with help from Alex, can be useful to the DEO. CatCo's new art director, James Olsen, reveals to Kara that he knows her secret identity, and passes on a gift: an indestructible cape made from Kal-El's baby wrappings.

In another part of the universe, news of Vartox's death reaches his commander, revealed to be General Astra, Alura's identical twin sister and Kara's aunt, who plans to take over Earth and kill Kara.

== Production ==
The plant where Supergirl and Vartox first do battle was shot in San Pedro, California but the producers' plan to extend the fight scene beyond the plant was scrapped. The rematch scene took two days of filming in the Mojave Desert.

The producers also note that Alex Danvers was created for the series, as she does not exist in the comic series. The producers also enlisted real-life Los Angeles news reporter Rick Garcia and Leyna Nguyen to make cameo appearances in this episode, and plan to utilize more media news talent from the Los Angeles area in the series.

The twist in the final scene featuring Astra was a last-minute addition by the producers, as she was also created for the television series, along with her background that featured another Kryptonian House without the "S" in its shield, which will also add to Kara's family background in future episodes.

=== Casting ===
In January 2015, it was announced that Melissa Benoist had been cast as Supergirl.

== Reception ==
=== Ratings ===
More than 12.96 million viewers watched the episode, making it one of CBS' most watch scripted dramas of the night and of the season, tying it with NBC's Blindspot as the top-rated series premiere of the 2015-16 fall season.

The episode attracted 1,606,000 viewers for its British premiere, making it the most watched programme on Sky One for the week.

=== Critical response ===
The episode received positive reviews, praising Melissa Benoist's take on the character and the well scripted storyline.

Jeff Jensen of Entertainment Weekly gave the episode a B−, and notes in his assessment of the review, "I'm glad Supergirl exists and I want it to succeed. If it never becomes anything more than a solid superhero genre show with a female lead, that's more than fine, especially since that lead is fantastic: The best counter to all my complaints is that Benoist makes it all work. The redeeming magic of perfect casting. Her performance embraces, internalizes, and sells the character's contradictions and paradoxes. She makes Kara feel real, she wears the costume proudly and easily, she's joy and complexity at once. Supergirl begins to fill a shameful void that needs to be followed with cleaner, more artful wins. It will most likely come from original creations — the next Buffy the Vampire Slayer, the next Veronica Mars — or adaptations of edgier, more contemporary properties that can allow for more creative daring, like The CW's excellent iZombie or (hopefully) the upcoming Netflix series, Marvel's Jessica Jones. The frustrations of Supergirl remind us that super-powered super-people often make for problematic vehicles for exploring issues of Otherness, diversity, race and gender – especially intrinsically flawed comic book brands beholden to the values of another era and bound by franchise restrictions. "Can you believe it? A female hero. Nice for my daughter to have someone like that to look up to." Yes, that is nice. Now, we need better."

Cliff Wheatley of IGN gave the pilot episode a 7/10, praising Melissa Benoist's performance as Kara and the fun take on the Superman mythos. In a review from The Hollywood Reporter, Daniel Feinberg said, "CBS' Supergirl shouldn't have to be a feminist landmark, but it is." Caroline Siede of The A.V. Club gave the episode a positive review, giving it a B. With the exception of the Kara backstory, she was pleased with the executed fast pace of how well the episode was structured: "While Supergirl is a little more grounded than The Flash, this premiere establishes the show's appropriately upbeat tone and sets up more than enough threads to explore across its first 13 episodes—and hopefully many more to come." Stacy Glanzman of TV Fanatic gave the episode a 5.0 out of 5 stars.
