= Vartox =

- Vartox' first appearance in Superman #281, art by Nick Cardy.

Publication information
- Publisher: DC Comics
- First appearance: Superman #281 (November 1974)
- Created by: Cary Bates (writer); Curt Swan (artist)

In-story information
- Alter ego: Vartox
- Species: Valeronian
- Place of origin: Valeron
- Notable aliases: Vernon O'Valeron
- Abilities: "Psychic by nature", possession of Hyper-powers grants him: Hyper strength; Hyper speed; Supersonic flight; Hyper-invulnerability; Hyper-senses; Hyper hearing; Hyper breath; Hyper freezing; Hyper-vision; Heat vision; Telescopic vision; Electromagnetic spectrum vision; Microscopic vision; X-ray vision; Night vision; Body possession; Power augmentation; Mind control; Hyper hypnotism; Telepathy; Telekinesis; Teleportation; Techno-empathy; Intangibility; Energy projection; Astral projection; Prognostication; Self-transmutation into pure hyper-energy; Magnetic powers; Matter transmutation; Energy transmutation; Skills: Has a device on his thighboots which emits various gases like paralysis causing gas; An accomplished inventor and a scientific genius

Vartox is a superhero published by DC Comics.

== Publication history ==
He first appeared in Superman #281 (November 1974) and was created by Cary Bates and Curt Swan. When asked if the character was inspired by the 1974 film Zardoz, Bates stated "Absolutely, I remember giving Curt a bunch of Zardoz stills as swipes".

== Fictional character biography ==
Vartox is an alien originating from the planet Valeron in the Sombrero Galaxy. Vartox is a friend and equal to Superman and the two have shared many adventures together. He is older and more experienced than Superman, serving as a rival to him and vying for Lana Lang's affection.

Vartox from Superman vol. 1, #375, artist Gil Kane.

Vartox's wife is killed after her "psychic twin" on Earth is murdered. Since the two women are "biologically linked", Vartox's wife also dies at the same moment. After discovering that forcibly arresting her killer would lead to the loss of innocent life, Vartox still plans to bring his wife's proxy killer to justice. Vartox journeys to Earth in order to lure the man responsible, Frank "Killer" Sykes, to Valeron. Vartox tricks Sykes into accompanying him voluntarily so that his trial will have the proper legal standing, and although Superman pursues the pair, he figures out Vartox's mission and allows Sykes to be extradited and tried on Valeron, where he is found guilty of murder. Instead of being imprisoned, Sykes is subjected to a treatment that ages him sixty years, the penalty for murder on Valeron.

Valeron is later destroyed and Vartox temporarily assumes the secret identity of Vernon O'Valeron, taking a job as a temporary security officer at television and media company Galaxy Communications. While at Galaxy, Vartox meets and falls in love with Lana Lang, once Superman's childhood sweetheart and modern-day rival (with Lois Lane) for his affections. By the time Lana and Vartox meet, however, she has abandoned her pursuit of Superman as hopeless, because she has accepted the reality that any true relationship with a man who literally took the responsibility of the world on his shoulders is all but impossible. Thus, Lana is struck hard by the bitter irony that "Vernon O'Valeron" turns out to be another such man, compounded by the fact that Vartox had committed to protecting another planet called Tynola.

During another of Vartox' stays on Earth, Lana is caught up in a complex revenge plot orchestrated by a former lover of Vartox from Valeron. Syreena wants payback for what she sees as Vartox' betrayal of her; in truth, his "betrayal" was arresting her for criminal acts committed with a siphoned portion of Vartox's powers, stolen from him through a device disguised as an amulet Syreena had given him as a "gift of love". Syreena first gives Vartox and Lana false hope by transforming Lana so that she can breathe in Tynola's atmosphere; she then makes it appear that an accidental ricochet of Vartox's energy beams has turned Lana to stone. All the while, she mentally manipulates Vartox from afar, appearing as her own "ghost" to render him irrational and unable to guess the truth.

Syreena still loves Vartox, and finds herself unable to deny him happiness. She restores Lana, at a terrible cost; the effect cannot be dispelled, only transferred, dooming Syreena to "life" as a stone statue. However, Vartox and Lana are forced to part once again—the effect that would have let her live on Tynola was apparently linked to the petrifaction effect, and both are transferred away when Lana is "cured". After saying good-bye to Lana, Vartox departs Earth, taking Syreena with him.

Vartox from Superman vol. 2, #148, artist Steve Epting.

=== Post-Crisis ===
In 1999, a post-Crisis version of Vartox was introduced by Dan Jurgens and Steve Epting. He makes his debut in Superman vol. 2 #148, alongside two other aliens named Vestion and Paz. This version has significantly reduced powers and a revised costume. After Valeron's champion Ontor dies, Vartox becomes his self-proclaimed successor.

=== Current status ===
Vartox returns in the Power Girl ongoing series. All the women of Valeron have recently been made sterile by a "contraceptive bomb", prompting Vartox to search for the best female specimen in the universe, so that they may mate and repopulate Valeron. Selecting Power Girl as the prime candidate, Vartox comes to Earth, staging a fight with an Ix Negaspike, an indestructible dragon-like alien, in an attempt to woo her. Power Girl accidentally breaks Vartox's containment device, making it impossible to send the Negaspike back. She attempts to stop the Negaspike by freezing and shattering it, only for the pieces to reform into a swarm of Negaspikes. Realizing that the Negaspike's intelligence is split between its parts, Power Girl and Vartox freeze and shatter all the individual Negaspikes before freezing them again and throwing them into space. After Vartox describes his people's predicament, he has Power Girl enter a "fertility chamber", which combines their life-forces to send out a "pregno-ray" to Valeron, making all the females and males pregnant. His mission complete, Vartox departs.

== In other media ==
- Vartox appears in the Supergirl episode "Pilot", portrayed by Owain Yeoman. This version is an escapee from the Phantom Zone prison Fort Rozz. After Supergirl defeats him, he commits suicide to avoid capture.
- Vartox appears in the audio drama Death From A Distant Galaxy, based on Superman #373 - #375.
