= Supergirl season 2 =

Supergirl
- Season 2
- Home media cover Blu-ray
- Showrunners: Greg Berlanti; Andrew Kreisberg
- Starring: Melissa Benoist; Mehcad Brooks; Chyler Leigh; Jeremy Jordan; Floriana Lima; Chris Wood; David Harewood
- No. of episodes: 22

Release
- Original network: The CW
- Original release: October 10, 2016 – May 22, 2017

Season chronology
- ← Previous; Season 1 Next → Season 3

The second season of the American television series Supergirl, which is based on the DC Comics character Supergirl / Kara Zor-El, a costumed superheroine who is the cousin to Superman and one of the last surviving Kryptonians.

The season was ordered in May 2016, and unlike the first season which aired on CBS, this season was picked up by The CW. While the first season was filmed in Los Angeles, beginning with this season filming relocated to Vancouver, to reduce the high production costs of the series. Other exterior shots were taken in Frankfurt (Germany) and show the local Deutsche Bank Building, which stands as the new headquarter for the DEO. The season was filmed from July 2016 to April 2017. Alongside Melissa Benoist, who stars in the title role, principal cast members Mehcad Brooks, Chyler Leigh, Jeremy Jordan, and David Harewood return from the first season, and are joined by Chris Wood, Floriana Lima, and Katie McGrath. Former series regular Calista Flockhart returns in a recurring capacity.

The season premiered on The CW on October 10, 2016, and ran until May 22, 2017, over 22 episodes. It received overall critical acclaim, being viewed as an improvement over the first season. The series was renewed for a third season on January 8, 2017. This is the first season to air on The CW.

== Episodes ==
Supergirl, season 2 episodes
No. overall	No. in season	Title	Directed by	Written by	Original release date	Prod. code	U.S. viewers (millions)
21	1	"The Adventures of Supergirl"	Glen Winter	Story by : Greg Berlanti & Andrew Kreisberg; Teleplay by : Andrew Kreisberg & Jessica Queller	October 10, 2016	T13.20151	3.06
Kara finds an unknown young man lying unconscious in the pod and takes him to DEO. She prepares for a date with James just as the commercial spacecraft, the Venture, is launched into space. It suffers engine failure and descends to Earth, but Kara saves the craft with help from Superman. They discover the main target was Lena Luthor, the new CEO of Luthor Corp after her brother, Lex, was convicted of numerous crimes. In a ceremony where she renames the company L-Corp, she is attacked again by John Corben, an assassin. Alex engages him while Kara and Clark stop a building from collapsing. Corben reveals he was working for Lex before he is shot by Lena. Kara chooses to be a reporter for CatCo, a decision supported by Cat. Kara and James decide to keep their relationship friendly. Winn is formally hired to work at the DEO. Meanwhile, J'onn reveals to Alex that he was the one who found the first cluster of Kryptonite and decided to keep it against the wishes of Clark, who wanted to destroy it. At Project Cadmus, the organization's leader revives Corben and begins turning him into a being called Metallo.
22	2	"The Last Children of Krypton"	Glen Winter	Robert Rovner & Caitlin Parrish	October 17, 2016	T13.20152	2.66
Kara and Clark continue operating together in National City before he decides to return to Metropolis. When they encounter Corben, who has turned into Project Cadmus' prototypical cyborg, his Kryptonite-based powers pose a serious threat. The DEO deduces that there is a mole who smuggled the Kryptonite out. During a subsequent encounter with Corben, another Metallo prototype goes on a rampage in Metropolis without opposition. Alex finds the mole, but he is killed by Cadmus's leader, a scientist who intends to destroy aliens. Winn builds anti-Kryptonite gear for Kara and Clark, who manage to defeat the Metallos with the help of Alex and Hank. Kara promises the Cadmus leader she will find her. Hank entrusts the remaining Kryptonite to Clark, who returns to Metropolis. Meanwhile, Cat introduces Kara to the latter's new boss, Snapper Carr, who does not like her and refuses to give her an assignment. Cat advises her to solve the problem herself and announces that she has decided to leave CatCo, leaving James in charge. Kara manages to prove her value to Snapper, who agrees to teach her. At the DEO, the alien man regains consciousness and attacks Kara.
23	3	"Welcome to Earth"	Rachel Talalay	Jessica Queller & Derek Simon	October 24, 2016	T13.20153	2.65
The alien man escapes the DEO. As President Olivia Marsdin arrives in National City to sign an act giving all aliens amnesty, she is attacked by an unknown alien with the power to shoot fiery energy, believed to be the escapee. Alex encounters police detective Maggie Sawyer at the crime scene, who takes her to a secret bar hosting aliens. Winn discovers the DEO escapee is from Daxam, Krypton's sister planet. Kara defeats the Daxamite and returns him to the DEO. She is uncharacteristically hostile towards him, prejudging his intentions because of a long feud between the Kryptonians and Daxamites. The President is attacked again while signing the Alien Amnesty Act; the assailant is revealed to be an Infernian named Scorcher, who is defeated by Kara, Alex, and Maggie. Kara releases the Daxamite, who introduces himself as Mon-El. She tells him that Daxam's population was annihilated and that Daxam is a wasteland due to Krypton's destruction. Olivia briefly flashes an alien face as she leaves, unbeknownst to the members of the DEO. Meanwhile, Kara interviews Lena, who reveals that L-Corp has invented an alien detection device. In the bar, Hank encounters M'gann M'orzz, a female Green Martian.
24	4	"Survivors"	James Marshall and James Bamford	Paula Yoo & Eric Carrasco	October 31, 2016	T13.20154	2.22
J'onn asks that Mon-El stay at the DEO until he is fully examined. An alien body is found and the DEO track down the murderer, who is then kidnapped by unknown armed men. Maggie and Alex track him down to a secret facility where a woman, Veronica Sinclair (also known as Roulette), hosts rich and powerful people. The aliens are forced to duel, sometimes to the death. They spot M'gann as a contestant before Kara intervenes and is attacked by an alien called Draaga, who overpowers her and escapes. J'onn confronts M'gann, who confesses her intense guilt for having survived the extinction of her species. Veronica abducts J'onn with M'gann's help. Using Lena, Kara finds the fight club's new address, where J'onn and M'gann are forced to duel until J'onn convinces her to stop blaming herself and she refuses to continue. When they are attacked by Draaga, Kara arrives and defeats him thanks to Mon-El's advice. She dissuades the other aliens from protecting Veronica, who is arrested but later released by orders from on high. M'gann secretly shapeshifts to reveal that she is a White Martian.
25	5	"Crossfire"	Glen Winter	Gabriel Llanas & Anna Musky-Goldwyn	November 7, 2016	T13.20155	2.47
A group of robbers, led by Chet Miner, starts challenging Supergirl using alien guns. Cadmus demands the repealing of the Amnesty as a solution. Kara deduces that Cadmus is arming Miner's team. Lena holds a fundraiser which is attacked by Miner and his men. She reveals to Winn that the fundraiser was a ruse for the robbers and they activate a device that destroys the alien weapons, leading to the robbers' arrest. Miner and his team are killed by Cadmus before he can expose them. The leader of Cadmus is revealed to be Lillian, Lena's adoptive mother. Meanwhile, Kara takes Mon-El to CatCo for work, but he continuously ignores her commands, leading to him being fired. Alex convinces her to let him choose his own path. James starts operating as a vigilante. Winn finds out and initially reprimands him, but finally decides to help, intending to make a suit for him. Alex learns that Maggie has broken up with her girlfriend and tries to cheer her up, with Maggie realizing Alex is a lesbian and Alex herself accepting that fact.
26	6	"Changing"	Larry Teng	Story by : Greg Berlanti; Teleplay by : Andrew Kreisberg & Caitlin Parrish	November 14, 2016	T13.20156	2.35
In Norway, a group of scientists led by Dr. Jones discover an abnormal wolf corpse, resulting in the mysterious murder of all of the scientists except Jones, who is revealed to be infected by a parasite. The DEO finds out that Jones killed the other scientists. Kara gets angry with Mon-El when she finds out that he has been using his powers to make money. The DEO predicts Jones' next target and Kara and J'onn attempt to stop him, but he drains their powers, becomes larger and stronger, and escapes, leaving the pair weakened and unconscious and J'onn near death. Alex convinces M'gann to donate blood in order to save J'onn. Jones attacks his target again, but Mon-El intervenes. With his suit ready, James arrives to fight Jones too, taking the alias "Guardian." Kara regains consciousness and attacks Jones using Plutonium 239, which he absorbs, causing him to overload with energy and implode. James convinces Winn not to tell Kara about his alter ego. Mon-El is abducted by Cadmus. Meanwhile, Alex comes out to Kara and tells her about her feelings for Maggie. Kara encourages her to tell Maggie how she feels, but Maggie reveals that she would prefer to remain friends, upsetting Alex.
27	7	"The Darkest Place"	Glen Winter	Robert Rovner & Paula Yoo	November 21, 2016	T13.20157	2.61
A new vigilante appears and starts killing some of the criminals. Mon-El continues his escape plans. Lillian demands Kara come to Cadmus. Kara is overpowered by the real Hank, who is enhanced and called the "Cyborg Superman." Winn helps identify the criminal targets with James help to try and stop the serial killer that was framing Guardian. Lillian forces Kara to deplete her powers, giving the former the chance to take blood samples. Jeremiah saves Kara and Mon-El and helps them escape by staying behind. Guardian confronts the culprit in Phillip Karnowski and defeats him as the police arrive. Kara finally approves of the Guardian, unaware of his true identity only known to Alex. Mon-El recognizes feelings for Kara. Cyborg Superman arrives at the Fortress of Solitude demanding to know about the "Medusa" project. Meanwhile, J'onn begins having hallucinations about White Martians in the DEO. She warns him about the transfusion and reveals that White Martians figured out how to weaponize their blood; if it is in a Green Martian, they become a White Martian, which is happening to J'onn. Alex finally accepts Maggie.
28	8	"Medusa"	Stefan Pleszczynski	Jessica Queller & Derek Simon	November 28, 2016	T13.20158	3.53
Cyborg Superman unleashes a virus in the alien bar, killing every alien there except Mon-El, who is quarantined by the DEO. Eliza Danvers, visiting for Thanksgiving, determines that the virus is Kryptonian. At the Fortress of Solitude, Kara learns that Henshaw was after "Medusa", a virus created by her father, Zor-El, to kill non-Kryptonians in case of alien invasion. At L-Corp, she stops Henshaw from getting the isotope required to disperse Medusa. Lena refuses to help when Kara reveals that Lillian is Cadmus' leader. Later, Lena willingly gives Lillian the isotope. Kara and J'onn confront the Luthors and Henshaw before Medusa is disseminated via rocket launcher. J'onn fights Henshaw, becoming a White Martian, while Kara chases the rocket, which explodes and disperses Medusa. However, Lena has double-crossed Lillian and rendered the virus inert. Lillian is arrested, but Henshaw escapes. Eliza cures Mon-El and uses Medusa to restore J'onn's Green Martian form. Alex comes out to Eliza, who supports her. Later, Maggie and Alex kiss after Maggie admits she does have feelings for Alex. An unknown alien race is searching for Mon-El. Barry Allen and Cisco Ramon arrive from their Earth to enlist Kara's help. Note: This episode begins a crossover event titled "Invasion!" that continues on The Flash season 3 episode 8 and Arrow season 5 episode 8, and concludes on Legends of Tomorrow season 2 episode 7.
29	9	"Supergirl Lives"	Kevin Smith	Story by : Andrew Kreisberg; Teleplay by : Eric Carrasco & Jess Kardos	January 23, 2017	T13.20159	2.65
Winn gets beaten aiding James, leading the former to believe he is not fit for field work. Kara starts investigating a strange series of missing persons. The DEO tracks the kidnappings to a fake clinical trial run by aliens. Searching for the missing people, Kara and Mon-El pass through a portal and land on the planet Maaldoria, epicenter of the slave trade. Realizing that they will not have their powers due to Maaldoria's red sun, the pair tracks the kidnappees to a fortress, intentionally getting captured to wind up in the same cell as the others. They learn that Roulette is involved in the trafficking. Meanwhile, J'onn reveals that the Maaldorian atmosphere is lethal to Martians, making Alex the lead on the rescue team. She convinces Winn to join her, despite his misgivings. Kara incites a riot and the prisoners lock Roulette and her Maaldorian accomplice in the cell before escaping. After reuniting with the DEO, they get to the portal and return to Earth. Winn accepts his potential, while Mon-El, whom the Maaldorians intentionally allowed to leave, decides to become a superhero. An alien group is revealed to be searching for Mon-El. Maggie tells Alex about her knowledge of Kara's alter ego.
30	10	"We Can Be Heroes"	Rebecca Johnson	Caitlin Parrish & Katie Rose Rogers	January 30, 2017	T13.20160	2.35
Kara starts training Mon-El. Leslie is found to be out of prison. Kara and Mon-El go off to engage Livewire, but it turns out to be another woman, who attacks the pair with a male of the same abilities. Mon-El ignores Kara's instructions to protect the civilians, choosing to save her instead. The Guardian arrives and aids them. Their adversaries escape and Kara finds out about James' alter ego, scolding him and Winn. She also gets angry with Mon-El for prioritizing her over the others. The DEO learns that Leslie was actually abducted from incarceration. Winn locates her. James and Mon-El rush there to prove themselves. The duo is captured by a scientist who has been draining Leslie's powers and giving them to his subjects. Kara arrives and saves them, freeing Leslie and dissuading her from killing the scientist in exchange for allowing her to escape. Kara rejects James' offer for cooperation in vigilantism. Mon-El confirms his feelings for her. Meanwhile, M'gann loses consciousness. J'onn agrees to bond with her. In a shared memory, he tells her that she is forgiven. She regains consciousness and J'onn frees her. She reveals that the White Martians are searching for her.
31	11	"The Martian Chronicles"	David McWhirter	Gabriel Llanas & Anna Musky-Goldwyn	February 6, 2017	T13.20161	2.43
J'onn starts following M'gann so as to protect her. Armek, her former mate, comes to Earth with orders to take her back to Mars for execution and gives her two hours to surrender before he goes after her friends. Fearful, J'onn decides to bring her to the DEO for protection. The real M'gann shows up, revealing the other one to be Armek in disguise, forcing J'onn to put the DEO into lockdown. Assuming Winn's identity, Armek initiates a meltdown in the building's nuclear reactor while another White Martian posing as Alex ambushes Kara. J'onn and M'gann free the real Winn and Alex and confront Armek, killing him with a metal pole. Winn fixes the reactor in time and Alex helps Kara subdue the other Martian. Afterwards, M'gann informs J'onn that she intends to return to her home planet in order to reform her people. Encouraged by Alex, Kara tries to ask Mon-El out on a date, only to find that he already has a relationship with Eve.
32	12	"Luthors"	Tawnia McKiernan	Robert Rovner & Cindy Lichtman	February 13, 2017	T13.20162	2.52
Lena testifies against Lillian, and Kara encourages her to visit Lillian, who reveals that she is her husband's daughter from another woman. A package of synthetic Kryptonite is sent to Corben. While testifying, he attacks the court and frees Lillian. A faked video is leaked showing Lena stealing the Kryptonite and she is arrested on suspicion of helping Lillian. Corben breaks her out. Kara remains the only person to believe in Lena's innocence. Lillian takes Lena to a remote facility set up by Lex before his imprisonment and forces her to access a stockpile of alien weapons, several of which she takes. Kara arrives and intervenes. Winn determines that the synthetic Kryptonite is becoming increasingly unstable and will soon explode. Kara manages to save Lena before Corben self-destructs while Lillian and Henshaw escape by helicopter. Lena is exonerated, but begins contemplating her relationship with her family, especially Lex. Kara and Mon-El, who had a disastrous date with Teschmacher, confess their feelings for each other at her apartment when a man calling himself Mister Mxyzptlk arrives and declares his love for her. Meanwhile, Alex introduces Maggie to the group as her girlfriend.
33	13	"Mr. & Mrs. Mxyzptlk"	Stefan Pleszczynski	Jessica Queller & Sterling Gates	February 20, 2017	T13.20163	2.24
Mxyzptlk, an imp from the fifth dimension who can manipulate reality, proposes marriage to Kara, whose refusal he sees as a challenge. Mon-El suggests killing Mxyzptlk, which she rejects. Mxyzptlk summons Parasite to attack National City before killing it in order to impress her. Mon-El inadvertently reveals that another way to remove imps is by getting them to say or spell their names backwards. Later, Winn discovers a device in the DEO's collection that is connected to the same fifth dimensional energy from which Mxyzptlk draws power. Mon-El attempts to use it to duel with Mxyzptlk to the death, but Kara ends the duel by agreeing to marry him. He later arrives at the Fortress of Solitude for their wedding, but Kara states that she will not marry him. Angered, he attacks her, but she stops the battle by locking the fortress down and activating the self-destruct sequence. Mxyzptlk begs for the code to stop the countdown but, after inputting the code, realizes that it spells his name backwards, vanquishing him. Mon-El and Kara develop a romance. Meanwhile, Winn starts dating Lyra Strayd, an alien from Starhaven, and Alex and Maggie celebrate their first Valentine's Day together.
34	14	"Homecoming"	Larry Teng	Caitlin Parrish & Derek Simon	February 27, 2017	T13.20164	2.17
The DEO receives an alarm regarding a convoy departing from Cadmus. Kara and J'onn investigate and rescue a chained Jeremiah, who claims Cadmus has created a fusion bomb using energy from her heat vision. He persuades J'onn to reinstate him back at the DEO, which makes Mon-El suspicious, causing friction between him and Kara. He persuades Winn to watch Jeremiah, who attempts to access the DEO's database, alerting Winn. After confronting Jeremiah, Kara is hesitant to accept his excuse, while Alex believes him. Winn locates the purported bomb, but the DEO finds nothing at the location. J'onn realizes he cannot read Jeremiah's mind and that he is working for Cadmus, having been cybernetically enhanced. Jeremiah overpowers J'onn and downloads information from the mainframe before escaping. Kara and Alex confront Jeremiah, Lillian, and Henshaw, and Kara rushes to save a train that Cadmus endangered while Alex goes after the trio. Jeremiah escapes due to Alex's reluctance to shoot him. Winn later determines that Jeremiah downloaded the list of all the registered aliens in the country.
35	15	"Exodus"	Michael Allowitz	Paula Yoo & Eric Carrasco	March 6, 2017	T13.20165	2.16
Cadmus begins abducting aliens, so Kara asks Snapper to publish an article, but he insists on verifying her sources. When Supergirl confirms the story but refuses to reveal her own source, Snapper refuses to publish. Alex's bias towards Jeremiah leads to J'onn suspending her, but Maggie decides to help her find him. They stop a Cadmus team from abducting an alien and find Cadmus' holding site. It is revealed Jeremiah was blackmailed into working for Cadmus; Lillian threatened to kill his daughters should he refuse. Lena also finds out about the site before Lillian's operatives attempt to stop her, but Kara manages to save Lena. At the Cadmus site, Alex is captured and Jeremiah reveals that Cadmus is planning to deport the aliens to another planet in a large spaceship; he had changed the plan from killing to deporting. Meanwhile, Kara publishes the story on a blog, forcing Lillian to deport the aliens she already has. Alex convinces Jeremiah to help her stop the launch and, while he engages Cadmus operatives, she enters the ship and frees the aliens, but they are locked inside by another gate before the ship launches, programmed to accelerate to light speed once exiting the atmosphere. Supergirl arrives and manages to stop the ship. Snapper fires Kara from CatCo, while Alex is reinstated by J'onn. Daxamites arrive near the Moon.
36	16	"Star-Crossed"	John Medlen	Katie Rose Rogers & Jess Kardos	March 20, 2017	T13.20166	2.07
The Daxamites demand the humans relinquish Mon-El, who surrenders. Kara accompanies him and learns that Mon-El is actually the Prince of Daxam. The ship is commanded by his parents, who want him to lead his people and rebuild Daxam. Kara becomes angry with Mon-El for lying to her. She and Mon-El return to Earth. He apologizes several times, but to no avail. She eventually ends the relationship. Mon-El demands his parents leave him and Earth. Meanwhile, Winn and Lyra break into an art museum for a tryst. He is later arrested by Maggie, who reveals that a painting is missing. Alex convinces Maggie to give them 24 hours to prove Winn's innocence. They find and capture Lyra, who reveals that her brother, Bastian, owes a large sum to a smuggler named Mandrax. She steals paintings to pay down Bastian's debt. Winn frees Lyra as part of a sting operation. The DEO and Guardian then confront and arrest Mandrax and free Bastian. Winn later forgives Lyra's dishonesty. The DEO has captured a new alien, who quickly hypnotizes Kara and escapes to Earth-1 to do the same to Barry. Kara wakes up in a dream where she is a lounge singer. This episode ends with a scene that sets up a crossover event that is featured on The Flash season 3 episode 17.
37	17	"Distant Sun"	Kevin Smith	Gabriel Llanas & Anna Musky-Goldwyn	March 27, 2017	T13.20167	2.21
Kara is attacked by a series of alien bounty hunters. Mon-El suspects his parents are responsible and hope that he will abandon Earth if Kara is dead. His suspicion is confirmed after J'onn telepathically interrogates one of the hunters. Kara suggests she and Mon-El meet with Rhea, his mother, to change her mind. However, Rhea refuses to listen and tries to kill Kara using Kryptonite, so Mon-El agrees to leave Earth if she spares Kara's life. Against President Marsdin's orders, J'onn helps Kara rescue Mon-El from his parents' ship and, after a fierce battle, King Lar Gand agrees to let Mon-El stay on Earth. Marsdin is revealed to be an alien. Rhea kills Lar Gand for what she views as his betrayal and vows to return to Earth to reclaim Mon-El. Meanwhile, after an encounter with an ex-girlfriend of Maggie's, Alex learns that Maggie neglected to tell her that she cheated on the woman, prompting a frank discussion in which Alex asks Maggie to trust her with her secrets.
38	18	"Ace Reporter"	Armen V. Kevorkian	Paula Yoo & Caitlin Parrish	April 24, 2017	T13.20168	1.80
Lena invites Kara to a press conference being held by her former boyfriend Jack Spheer, who unveils Biomax, a new nanobot technology that can heal human ailments. After the conference, Kara is approached and told the human trials of Biomax were faked, but her source is killed by the nanobots before she is told more. Kara and Mon-El crash Lena and Jack's dinner date and take Jack's keycard for his office, discovering footage showing Jack injecting Biomax into himself. Kara later shows the footage to Lena, who confronts Jack and discovers he is being controlled by his CFO Beth Breen via the side effect of the nanobots, loss of free will. Supergirl then turns up to save Lena, but when the former is trapped by the nanobots, Lena is forced to deactivate them, killing Jack in the process. Breen is incarcerated and Snapper rehires Kara at CatCo for providing the Biomax story. Lena is visited by Rhea. Meanwhile, Winn brings Lyra onto the team with him and Guardian, causing tensions that lead to Lyra leaving the team. James returns her to the team with the condition that she follow his instructions.
39	19	"Alex"	Rob Greenlea	Eric Carrasco & Greg Baldwin	May 1, 2017	T13.20169	1.75
Alex is abducted by a person who demands the release of Peter Thompson, a man serving a life sentence for several felonies. The kidnapper is identified as Rick Malverne, Thompson's son and also a childhood friend of the Danvers, having deduced Kara's alter ego on his own. Rick is captured and taken to the DEO. Alex sends a location to Winn, but when Kara rushes to the coordinates, the trap triggers an alarm, causing water to start filling Alex's cell. While the DEO and Kara refuse to negotiate with Rick, Maggie tries to break Thompson out of prison before being confronted by Kara, who convinces Thompson to reveal Alex's location. Kara and Maggie manage to rescue Alex in time and Alex and Maggie profess their love for each other. J'onn decides to wipe Rick's memory. Meanwhile, Rhea gives Lena the schematics of a high-tech device for transporting matter. Lena soon deduces that Rhea is an alien and becomes angry, but Rhea manages to convince her to continue working with her.
40	20	"City of Lost Children"	Ben Bray	Story by : Robert Rovner; Teleplay by : Gabriel Llanas & Anna Musky-Goldwyn	May 8, 2017	T13.20170	1.88
James becomes discouraged with being Guardian when he realizes that those he helps are afraid of him. The DEO investigates a Phorian woman who uses her telekinetic powers to cause rampage. James tracks down her son, Marcus, who refuses to speak with anyone but James, who spends time bonding with him. With Rhea's encouragement, Lena completes the matter transporter, which Rhea activates, causing Marcus to nearly destroy the office with his powers. Afterwards, the DEO discovers Rhea and Lena's involvement and that Marcus's mother's "attack" was unintentional on her part. Marcus leads James and Winn to his mother, who is with a large group of Phorians. Rhea reactivates the transporter, causing the Phorians to lose control. James manages to calm Marcus, who in turn calms the others. Kara, J'onn, and Mon-El attempt to shut down the transporter, but are unsuccessful. Mon-El confronts Rhea, but hesitates to kill her. The transporter brings a massive fleet of Daxamite ships to conquer Earth and transform it into "New Daxam". Rhea then teleports herself, Mon-El, and Lena to her ship.
41	21	"Resist"	Millicent Shelton	Jessica Queller & Derek Simon	May 15, 2017	T13.20171	1.93
The Daxamites launch a full invasion of National City, killing and arresting civilians. They also attack the DEO, but Alex and Winn manage to escape. Mon-El learns that he has to marry Lena in order to unite the people of Earth with Daxam. On Air Force One, Marsdin and Cat contact Rhea and demand their withdrawal, but the Daxamite fleet fires on them. Kara saves Cat and they discover that Marsdin is an alien, a refugee from the planet Durla. She tasks the DEO with destroying the Daxamite mother ship with a special cannon. Hesitant to do so, Kara turns to Cadmus for a way into the ship. Cat and Winn stage a distraction, inciting a civilian riot against the Daxamites, while Kara, Hank, and Lillian use a Phantom Zone projector to board the ship. Alex and Maggie regain control of the cannon, while the Luthors escape and try to disable the projector. Having predicted that, Supergirl is able to send Mon-El to safety and goes to confront Rhea, who reveals that she has taken control of Superman and has him attack Kara.
42	22	"Nevertheless, She Persisted"	Glen Winter	Story by : Andrew Kreisberg & Jessica Queller; Teleplay by : Robert Rovner & Caitlin Parrish	May 22, 2017	T13.20172	2.12
Rhea uses Silver Kryptonite to manipulate Kal's senses, causing Kara to appear to be General Zod. Kara eventually overpowers and takes him to the Fortress, where a recovered Kal finds a way to end the invasion. Kara challenges Rhea to Dakkam Ur, a rite in which two leaders duel and the loser concedes the war, accepted by Rhea. Lillian, Lena and Winn build a device to disperse lead into the atmosphere. As lead is lethal to Daxamites, it would make the planet uninhabitable to them. With Mon-El's approval, Kara tells the DEO to use it if she loses. During the duel, Rhea resumes the invasion. M'gann returns with other benevolent White Martians and J'onn awakens to join the battle. Rhea claims the invasion will not stop even if she loses, so Kara launches the device, killing Rhea and forcing the fleet to leave. Kara puts Mon-El in a pod and sends him away from Earth. Cat reassumes her position at CatCo and Alex asks Maggie to marry her. In deep space, Mon-El's pod is drawn into a wormhole. In flashbacks to Krypton's destruction, an unknown faction sends another infant to Earth in order to "reign."

== Cast and characters ==
=== Main ===
- Melissa Benoist as Kara Danvers / Kara Zor-El / Supergirl
- Mehcad Brooks as James Olsen / Guardian
- Chyler Leigh as Alex Danvers
- Jeremy Jordan as Winslow "Winn" Schott Jr.
- Floriana Lima as Maggie Sawyer
- Chris Wood as Mon-El / Mike Matthews
- David Harewood as J'onn J'onzz / Martian Manhunter and Hank Henshaw / Cyborg Superman

=== Recurring ===
- Andrea Brooks as Eve Teschmacher
- Brenda Strong as Lillian Luthor
- Calista Flockhart as Cat Grant
- Ian Gomez as Snapper Carr
- Katie McGrath as Lena Luthor
- Tyler Hoechlin as Kal-El / Clark Kent / Superman
- Sharon Leal as Miss Martian / M'gann M'orzz
- Helen Slater as Eliza Danvers
- Tamzin Merchant as Lyra Strayd
- Teri Hatcher as Queen Rhea

=== Guest ===
- Frederick Schmidt as John Corben / Metallo
- Rich Ting as Gilcrist / Metallo
- Lynda Carter as U.S. President Olivia Marsdin
- Nadine Crocker as Scorcher
- Dichen Lachman as Veronica Sinclair / Roulette
- William Mapother as Rudy Jones / Parasite
- Dean Cain as Jeremiah Danvers
- Victor Zinck, Jr. as Phillip Karnowsky / Barrage
- Grant Gustin as Barry Allen / Flash
- Carlos Valdes as Cisco Ramon / Vibe
- Harley Quinn Smith as Izzy Williams
- Ian Butcher as Lionel Luthor
- Aidan Fink as young Lex Luthor
- Peter Gadiot as Mister Mxyzptlk
- Kevin Sorbo as King Lar Gand
- Darren Criss as Music Meister
- Rahul Kohli as Jack Spheer
- Lonnie Chavis as Marcus
- Mark Gibbon as General Zod

== Production ==
=== Development ===
On May 12, 2016, Warner Bros. Television announced that Supergirl had been renewed for a second season of 22 episodes and would move to The CW from CBS. Ali Adler and Andrew Kreisberg served as the season's showrunners. It was also announced that, beginning with this season, production would relocate to Vancouver from Los Angeles.

=== Writing ===
In the second season, Kara Danvers / Supergirl and James Olsen end their romantic relationship, in favor of maintaining a platonic one. Kreisberg said regarding this decision, "We realized that the best scenes between [Kara and James] were just the nice, sweet scenes where they were being friends." He also said that while the theme of the first season was "how does Kara become Supergirl?", the theme of the second would be "how does Supergirl become Kara?". Kriesberg said another theme of the season was "about coming into one's own and becoming who you are", such as Winn Schott becoming who he is by joining the Department of Extranormal Operations (DEO), and J'onn J'onzz embracing his Martian Manhunter persona, which he spent 300 years concealing, but does not have to any longer. The season is split in two-halves each with their own self-contained "big bad" story: Project Cadmus serves as the "big bad" of the first half, and Queen Rhea for the second half.

The season establishes that Alex Danvers is gay, with Maggie Sawyer being her partner. Chyler Leigh, who plays Alex, explained, "it's not like this thing that all of a sudden is just spilling out, it's a discovery for her". She added, "You have so many stories [...] where people are already established as gay, lesbian, bi[sexual]; these are people who are coming in like that" and described the second season as a "great opportunity to show somebody who's figuring it out, the light bulb moment and putting the puzzle pieces together." While the first season showed that the DEO operates in an isolated cave located "in the middle of nowhere", the second season shows that the DEO has relocated to their other base, a skyscraper in National City. Kreisberg explained that the creative team of Supergirl "fell out of love" with the DEO's cave setting, saying "It was cool in the beginning, and it just for some reason didn't feel like it was bringing everything together", hence the reason for shifting to the skyscraper setting.

=== Casting ===
Melissa Benoist, Mehcad Brooks, Chyler Leigh, Jeremy Jordan, and David Harewood return from the first season as Kara Danvers / Supergirl, James Olsen, Alex Danvers, Winn Schott and J'onn J'onzz / Martian Manhunter, respectively. They are joined by Chris Wood and Floriana Lima, portraying Mon-El and Maggie Sawyer, respectively. Harewood also portrays Hank Henshaw, who becomes this series' version of Cyborg Superman. The season establishes Olsen as the vigilante Guardian, unlike the comics where Jim Harper is the vigilante. The producers decided to depict Sawyer as a Latino for the series, unlike the comics where she is a white blonde; however, the character's homosexuality was retained for the series.

With the move of production to Vancouver, it was unclear if Calista Flockhart, who played Cat Grant in the first season, would remain with the series, as her original contract stipulated that she work near her home in Los Angeles. The CW president Mark Pedowitz said Flockhart wanted to remain with the series and that "We're in ongoing discussions... we're happy to have her in [in whatever capacity] works out." Flockhart ultimately reached a deal to be recurring in the second season. Andrea Brooks originally auditioned for the role of Sawyer, although she herself admitted that she did not feel that role was a "good fit". She was subsequently sent a further script to audition for the role of Janice. Having won the role, it was not until she received her first episode script that she discovered she would in fact be playing the recurring role of Eve Teschmacher. The character's name is a reference to a character of the same name played by Valerie Perrine in Superman (1978) and its 1980 sequel. Katie McGrath also joined this season in the recurring role of Lena Luthor.

=== Design ===
Tyler Harron worked as the production designer for the season. With the move of the production to Vancouver from Los Angeles, Harron decided to take elements from the existing sets and rebuild them in Vancouver from scratch, rather than pack the sets such as CatCo and Kara Danver's loft, ship them to Vancouver and rebuild them there. This was done due to the difficulty of having separate crews to ship the sets to Vancouver and unpack them there. Kara's loft was designed to look almost exactly as it was in the first season, while CatCo was substantially redesigned.

=== Filming ===
The second season was filmed in Vancouver, rather than Los Angeles where the first season was shot. This was done to reduce the high production costs of the series, one of the issues that made CBS wary to renew the series on their network. Kriesberg explained that it "would've started to feel very small" if production had continued in Los Angeles, and that they chose to relocate to Vancouver to shoot in its outdoor locations, rather than continue facing the constraints of shooting mainly inside the studio at Los Angeles. Pedowitz said the series' move to Vancouver made crossovers with another CW superhero series, The Flash, "easier to facilitate" as the series also films in Vancouver. Filming for the season began in July 2016, and ended in April 2017.

=== Music ===
The score for the season was composed by Blake Neely.

Track listing
No.	Title	Length
1.	"Superman"	2:17
2.	"Famous Cousins Working Together"	2:01
3.	"First Day as a Reporter"	2:14
4.	"Goodbye to Cat"	2:05
5.	"Fighting Fire with Fire"	2:45
6.	"Cage Fighting Aliens"	2:22
7.	"Mon-El's First Day as an Intern"	1:19
8.	"Always a Sidekick"	2:17
9.	"Roulette / Thing from Another Planet"	2:46
10.	"Guardian"	2:37
11.	"Alex Tells Maggie"	1:32
12.	"Virus Threat"	3:07
13.	"Sense About Her"	2:46
14.	"Star-Crossed Martians"	3:14
15.	"Mind Meld"	3:15
16.	"The Luthors"	3:09
17.	"Mxyzptlk"	2:45
18.	"Duel with Mxyzptlk"	3:04
19.	"Cadmus"	1:39
20.	"All I Thought About"	2:53
21.	"Saving Her Sister and the Ark"	2:48
22.	"Mon-El's True History"	3:58
23.	"Why Are You Doing This?"	2:58
24.	"Almost Losing Alex"	2:01
25.	"Jimmy Bonds with Marcus"	2:31
26.	"Daxamites Invade"	1:52
27.	"Forcing a Marriage"	1:54
28.	"Fighting Superman"	2:47
29.	"Releasing the Lead / Mon-El Says Goodbye"	3:35
30.	"I Am So Proud of You"	1:49
31.	"Thirty Five Years Ago"	1:23

=== Arrowverse tie-ins ===
The episode "Medusa" ends with a scene where Barry Allen and Cisco Ramon of Earth-1 arrive at Kara's loft enlisting her help with a problem on their Earth, thereby setting up the Arrowverse crossover event "Invasion!" that begins on The Flash season 3 episode 8, continues on Arrow season 5 episode 8 and concludes on Legends of Tomorrow season 2 episode 7. This scene is later repeated in the Flash episode of the crossover. Kara/Supergirl appears in all three episodes as a visitor to their universe due to Supergirl being set in a different Earth, referred to as Earth-38 by the inhabitants of the Arrowverse, and has been informally referred to as "Earth-CBS" by Arrow showrunner Marc Guggenheim, named for the network where Supergirl first aired. Similarly, the episode "Star-Crossed" ends with Music Meister hypnotizing Kara and fleeing to Earth-1 to do the same to Barry, thus initiating the events of The Flash season 3 episode "Duet".

== Release ==
=== Broadcast ===
The season began airing on The CW on October 10, 2016, in the United States, and ended on May 22, 2017. It premiered on the same day as the United States in Canada on Showcase, and on October 24, 2016, in the United Kingdom on Sky One.

=== Home media ===
The season was released on DVD in Region 2 on August 21, 2017, on DVD and Blu-ray in Region 1 on August 22, and DVD Region 3 on August 23.

== Reception ==
=== Ratings ===
Viewership and ratings per episode of Supergirl season 2
No.	Title	Air date	Rating/share (18–49)	Viewers (millions)	DVR (18–49)	DVR viewers (millions)	Total (18–49)	Total viewers (millions)
1	"The Adventures of Supergirl"	October 10, 2016	1.1/3	3.06	—N/a	—N/a	—N/a	—N/a
2	"The Last Children of Krypton"	October 17, 2016	0.9/3	2.66	0.6	1.42	1.5	4.08
3	"Welcome to Earth"	October 24, 2016	0.8/3	2.65	—N/a	1.37	—N/a	4.03
4	"Survivors"	October 31, 2016	0.6/2	2.22	0.6	1.59	1.2	3.80
5	"Crossfire"	November 7, 2016	0.7/3	2.47	0.7	1.71	1.4	4.18
6	"Changing"	November 14, 2016	0.7/3	2.35	0.6	1.42	1.3	3.85
7	"The Darkest Place"	November 21, 2016	0.9/3	2.61	0.5	1.35	1.4	3.98
8	"Medusa"	November 28, 2016	1.1/4	3.53	0.8	1.76	1.9	5.29
9	"Supergirl Lives"	January 23, 2017	0.8/3	2.65	0.5	1.48	1.3	4.13
10	"We Can Be Heroes"	January 30, 2017	0.7/3	2.35	0.5	1.40	1.2	3.75
11	"The Martian Chronicles"	February 6, 2017	0.7/3	2.43	—N/a	1.38	—N/a	3.81
12	"Luthors"	February 13, 2017	0.8/3	2.52	—N/a	—N/a	—N/a	—N/a
13	"Mr. & Mrs. Mxyzptlk"	February 20, 2017	0.7/3	2.24	—N/a	1.30	—N/a	3.54
14	"Homecoming"	February 27, 2017	0.7/3	2.17	—N/a	—N/a	—N/a	—N/a
15	"Exodus"	March 6, 2017	0.7/3	2.16	0.5	1.28	1.2	3.46
16	"Star-Crossed"	March 20, 2017	0.6/2	2.07	0.6	1.43	1.2	3.50
17	"Distant Sun"	March 27, 2017	0.7/3	2.21	—N/a	1.28	—N/a	3.49
18	"Ace Reporter"	April 24, 2017	0.5/2	1.80	—N/a	—N/a	—N/a	—N/a
19	"Alex"	May 1, 2017	0.5/2	1.75	0.4	1.26	0.9	3.00
20	"City of Lost Children"	May 8, 2017	0.6/3	1.88	—N/a	1.19	—N/a	3.07
21	"Resist"	May 15, 2017	0.5/2	1.93	0.5	1.29	1.0	3.22
22	"Nevertheless, She Persisted"	May 22, 2017	0.6/2	2.12	0.5	1.19	1.1	3.31

=== Critical response ===
The review aggregator website Rotten Tomatoes gave the second season a 92% approval rating from critics with an average rating of 7.91/10, based on 327 reviews. The site's consensus reads, "The arrival of the more famous cousin in Supergirl does nothing to detract from the show's lead, who continues to deliver strength, action, and relatability." Metacritic, which uses a weighted average, assigned a score of 81 out of 100 based on 4 reviews, indicating "universal acclaim".

Jesse Schedeen of IGN rated the season 7.3 out of 10, giving the verdict, "In many ways, Supergirl improved in its second season as the show moved to The CW and bolstered its already solid cast with several new favorites. This season not only looked better, it managed to blend epic superhuman conflicts with very real, authentic character drama and a status quo marked by plenty of anti-alien sentiment in National City. But not every character benefited from the shake-ups this season, and not every lingering Season 1 problem was addressed. And while the season as a whole had more good elements than bad, the final trio of lackluster episodes managed to end the year on a real down note." Evan Valentine of Collider ranked the season at number 10 in his list of best and worst superhero television series of 2017, writing, "Supergirl is a stalwart within a sea of superhero shows, not necessarily standing out, but not ever being terrible. Melissa Benoist still does a fantastic job of portraying "the Girl of Steel," but we are hitting Smallville-levels of drama with the rest of the characters". PopMatters writer James Plath rated the season 7 out 10 stars.

=== Accolades ===
Award nominations for Supergirl, season 2
Year	Award	Category	Nominee(s)	Result	Ref.
2017	GLAAD Awards	Outstanding Drama Series	Supergirl	Nominated	
2017	Kids' Choice Awards	Favorite TV Show – Family Show	Supergirl	Nominated	
2017	Saturn Awards	Best Actress on Television	Melissa Benoist	Won	
2017	Saturn Awards	Best Guest Performance in a Television Series	Tyler Hoechlin	Nominated	
2017	Saturn Awards	Best Superhero Adaptation Television Series	Supergirl	Won	
2017	Saturn Awards	Best Supporting Actor on Television	Mehcad Brooks	Nominated	
2017	Teen Choice Awards	Choice Action TV Actor	Chris Wood	Nominated	
2017	Teen Choice Awards	Choice Action TV Actress	Melissa Benoist	Won	
2017	Teen Choice Awards	Choice Action TV Show	Supergirl	Nominated	
2017	Teen Choice Awards	Choice Liplock	Melissa Benoist and Chris Wood	Nominated	
2017	Teen Choice Awards	Choice TV Ship	Melissa Benoist and Chris Wood	Nominated	
2017	Teen Choice Awards	Choice TV Villain	Teri Hatcher	Nominated	
