= Worlds Finest =

- Supergirl episode
- A promotional poster for the episode, inspired by the cover of Superman #199 (1967)
- Episode no.: Season 1 Episode 18
- Directed by: Nick Gomez
- Story by: Greg Berlanti
- Teleplay by: Andrew Kreisberg; Michael Grassi
- Production code: 4X7618
- Original air date: March 28, 2016

Guest appearances
- Grant Gustin as Barry Allen / Flash (special guest star); Jenna Dewan Tatum as Lucy Lane (special guest star); Chris Vance as Non; Italia Ricci as Siobhan Smythe / Silver Banshee; Brit Morgan as Leslie Willis / Livewire; Harriet Sansom Harris as Sinead

Episode chronology
← Previous "Manhunter"	Next → "Myriad"
- Supergirl season 1

"Worlds Finest" is the eighteenth episode of the first season of the American superhero television series Supergirl. It aired on CBS on March 28, 2016. The episode's teleplay was written by Andrew Kreisberg and Michael Grassi, and directed by Nick Gomez.

The episode features a crossover appearance by the title character of the CW series The Flash (also developed and produced by Greg Berlanti and Kreisberg), marking the first episode of the series to feature a character from the Arrowverse, and the first character from a CW series to cross over to a CBS series before the show itself moved to the CW network. The episode loosely intersects with the events of The Flash season 2 episode "Versus Zoom".

The episode reunites Melissa Benoist with her former Glee recurring co-star Grant Gustin, who portrays the Flash. The episode title was inspired by the World's Finest Comics series, in which Superman would team up with various other DC superheroes, including the Flash.

== Plot ==
At the DEO, Siobhan Smythe is treated for her fall. The doctor cannot explain her new powers, but confirms she is still human. As she leaves, Siobhan overhears Leslie Willis a.k.a. Livewire being interrogated and starts seeing images of a banshee. The visions continue as she returns to CatCo, where Cat advises Kara about her relationship with James. Siobhan's hypersonic scream sends Kara flying out the window, but a dimensional breach opens and someone rushes out at a high speed and catches Kara, letting her down in a field.

The speedster introduces himself as Barry Allen, a.k.a. the Flash, a superhero from a parallel Earth, after Kara reveals herself as Supergirl, and Barry later learns her extraterrestrial origin. At CatCo, Barry meets Winn and James and explains the multiverse and how he reached their universe when testing a tachyon device fastened to his suit. Fascinated by each other's origins, Kara and Barry quickly become friends, and Kara offers to help Barry find a way home. Winn also befriends Barry attributable to his own fascination with parallel universes, but James is overawed by Barry's abilities. Cat calls the four into her office and demands they research the new superhero, rejecting Barry's idea to call him the Flash.

Siobhan's aunt Sinead tells her of a banshee's curse on their family. If wronged by others, Smythe women are possessed and develop a powerful wail that belongs to the spirit—to combat the curse, one must kill whoever wronged them. Siobhan concludes she must remove Supergirl to get Kara, unaware they are the same person, and frees Livewire. Cat refuses to go into hiding, so Kara asks for Barry's help and they pinpoint Livewire's location.

The Flash attacks Livewire with lightning, but this charges her powers. Supergirl tries to short out Livewire, but Siobhan, now calling herself Silver Banshee, screams and disorients her. The heroes retreat and Kara apologizes for going in without a plan. Barry recalls his similar experience with Roy Bivolo, advising her to practice patience. Barry develops ear buds to dampen Silver Banshee's scream based on those he used against Hartley Rathaway. Livewire and Silver Banshee kidnap Cat and demand the two heroes come to National City Park.

Livewire wreaks havoc before Supergirl and Flash arrive. Supergirl frees Cat before engaging Silver Banshee; Flash tackles Livewire, but she knocks him out. Livewire attacks a passing helicopter, but Supergirl takes the blow to protect the people below. The crowd surrounds her, and firefighters blast Livewire with water, causing her to lose control and shock Silver Banshee, defeating both. National City hails Supergirl as a hero again. With Flash's help, the police develop a means of incarcerating metahuman criminals, imprisoning Livewire and Silver Banshee.

Cat reveals to Kara that she knew Barry was the Flash all along. At the field, Barry determines the kinetic energy from their combined running speed, with the tachyon device active, should create a breach back to his Earth. The two bid farewell before Barry enters the portal. Kara confesses her feelings to James, but he unemotionally walks out. Kara sees all the citizens acting similarly, marching in synchronicity. Non is revealed to be behind these events, as Myriad takes effect.

== Development ==
In November 2014, creator Greg Berlanti expressed interest in Supergirl existing in the Arrowverse, the same universe as his other series Arrow and The Flash, and in January 2015, The CW president Mark Pedowitz revealed that he was also open to a crossover between the series and networks (due to Berlanti executive producing all three and The CW being co-owned by CBS). However, CBS Entertainment chair Nina Tassler stated that month that "those two shows are on a different network. So I think we'll keep Supergirl to ourselves for a while." In August 2015, Tassler revealed that while there were no plans at the time to do crossover storylines, the three series would have crossover promotions.

In January 2016, during the Television Critics Association press tour, Pedowitz said that The CW was still interested in a crossover with Supergirl if the producers could find a way to do it, and Berlanti added that while no official conversations had taken place, internal ones had concerning how a crossover would work. He also noted that for a crossover to happen during Supergirl's first season, it would have to be figured out "in the next month or so". Glenn Geller, Tassler's successor at CBS, then stated on the matter, "I have to be really careful what I say here. Watch and wait and see what happens."

On February 3, 2016, it was announced that Grant Gustin, who appears as Barry Allen / Flash on The Flash, would appear in the eighteenth episode of the first season, "Worlds Finest". While no plot details on the episodes were released at the time, Ross A. Lincoln of Deadline Hollywood noted that "the in-universe reason" for the crossover was due to Barry's ability to travel to various dimensions, thus implying that Supergirl exists on an alternate Earth to Arrow and The Flash in a multiverse. The earth that Supergirl inhabits is Earth-38 in the Arrowverse multiverse, and has been informally referred to as "Earth-CBS" by Marc Guggenheim, one of the creators of Arrow. "Worlds Finest" loosely intersects with the events of The Flash season 2 episode "Versus Zoom".

== Reception ==
=== Ratings ===
In the United States, the episode received a 1.7/6 percent share among adults between the ages of 18 and 49, meaning that it was seen by 1.7 percent of all households, and 6 percent of all of those watching television at the time of the broadcast. It was watched by 7.17 million viewers. Within a week of its release, "Worlds Finest" had been watched by 9.63 million U.S. viewers.

=== Critical response ===
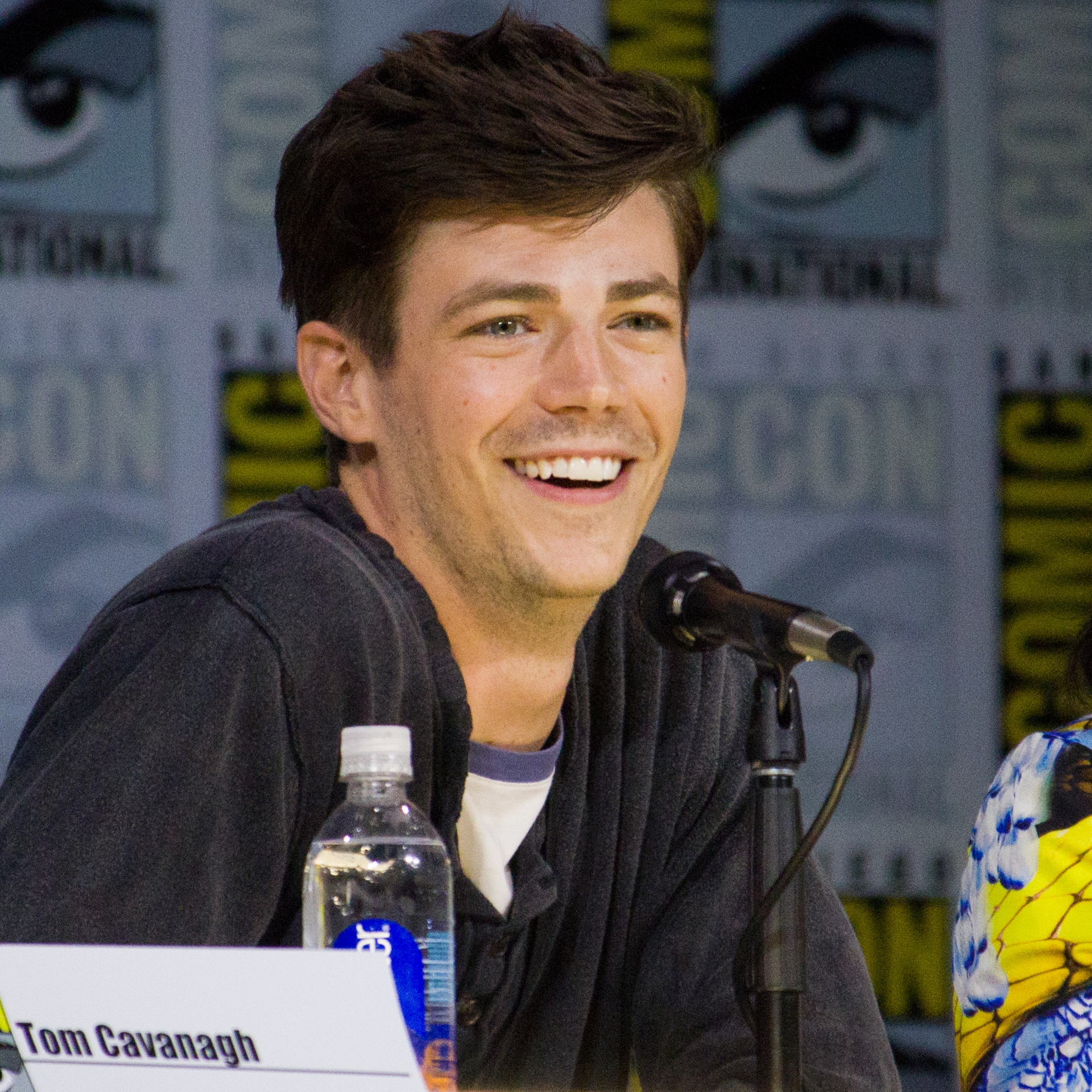
Grant Gustin received critical acclaim for his appearance as The Flash

Cliff Wheatley of IGN gave the episode an 8.6/10, stating "After the grim 'n' gritty Batman v Superman, Supergirl's "Worlds Finest" offered a fun, upbeat palette cleanser and one of the series' strongest episodes to date. Instead of the usual "beatdown" introduction, Supergirl and the Flash went straight to being superfriends, which was refreshing. Not only did Barry Allen fit perfectly in Kara's world, but actors Grant Gustin and Melissa Benoist had fantastic chemistry together onscreen. While the city's turnaround on Supergirl's Red K incident was a little sudden, overall, "Worlds Finest" was delightful."

Caroline Siede of The A.V. Club gave the episode an A−, stating "My biggest fear going into "World's Finest" was that the episode would be a fun one-off designed to convert Flash fans into Supergirl fans (and vice versa, I suppose) while ignoring the compelling narrative Supergirl has been exploring since Kara went bad in "Falling". Instead "World's Finest" relies heavily on Supergirl's long-term storytelling, pulling together threads from the entire season into one jam-packed episode. And it does so while introducing the most enjoyable superhero team-up this side of The Avengers. For better or for worse, "World's Finest" represents Supergirl in a nutshell: Fun, clunky, cheesy, and more intelligent than it seems at first glance."
