= Ali Adler =

Canadian-American television producer and writer

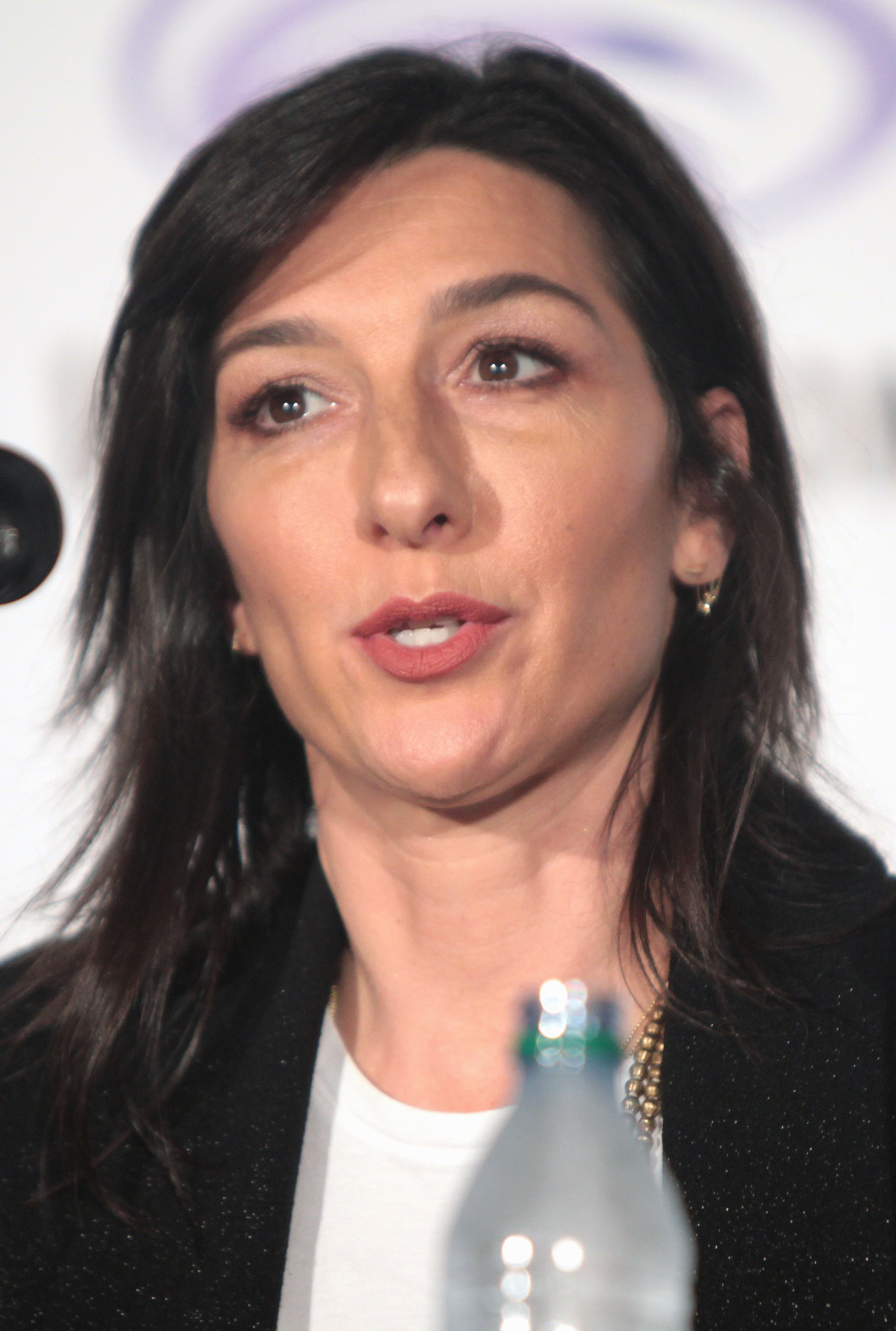
- Adler in 2016
- Born: Allison Beth Adler; May 30, 1967 (age 59); Montreal, Quebec, Canada
- Occupations: Producer, writer
- Years active: 1991–present
- Partner: Sara Gilbert (2001–2011)
- Children: 2

Allison Beth Adler (born May 30, 1967) is a Canadian-American television producer and writer. She is the co-creator of Supergirl and The New Normal, and is also known for her work on Chuck and Family Guy.

== Early life ==
Adler was born in Montreal, Quebec, Canada, to a Jewish family. Her grandfather and father were Holocaust survivors from Romania. They later became American citizens.

== Career ==
Adler began her career by working on a TV series named Veronica's Closet in 1997. From 2001 to 2002, Adler produced 13 episodes of Family Guy and 16 episodes of Just Shoot Me!; she was supervising producer for nine episodes of Still Standing. She was co-executive producer on various shows, including Life As We Know It, Women of a Certain Age, and Emily's Reasons Why Not.

Adler produced Chuck as co-executive and executive producer from 2007 to 2010. Adler then joined the ABC series No Ordinary Family in May 2010 and in 2011 became a part of Glee's writing team starting with the third season. She and Glee creator Ryan Murphy co-created The New Normal, which she worked on until it was cancelled in May 2013.

In 2015, Adler co-created Supergirl with Greg Berlanti and Andrew Kreisberg. The drama was based on Superman's female cousin, Kara Zor-El. After two seasons, in 2017 Adler left Supergirl full-time to join The CW's reboot of Dynasty and sign a development deal with CBS Television Studios.

=== Advocacy ===
In October 2023, Adler signed an open letter by Artists4Ceasefire to Joe Biden, President of the United States, calling for a ceasefire of Israeli bombardment in Gaza.

== Personal life ==
From 2001 to 2011, Adler was in a relationship with actress Sara Gilbert. They have two children: a son, born to Adler in October 2004, and a daughter, born to Gilbert in August 2007. In August 2011, Gilbert announced that she and Adler had separated amicably.
