= List of The Flash characters =

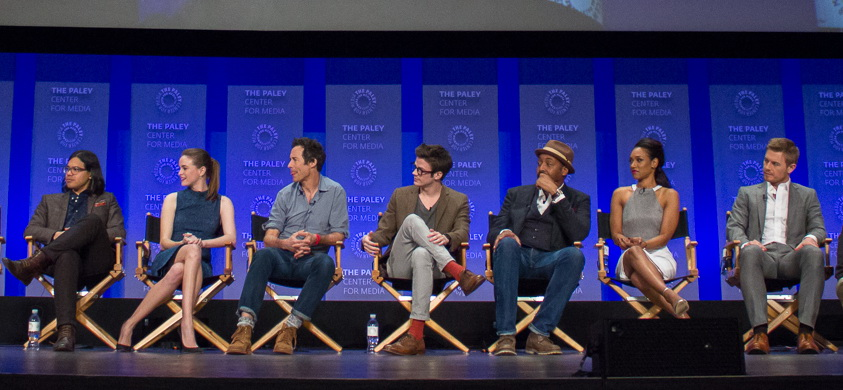
Main cast members (L–R) Valdes, Panabaker, Cavanagh, Gustin, Martin, Patton, and Cosnett at PaleyFest 2015

The Flash is an American television series developed by Greg Berlanti, Andrew Kreisberg, and Geoff Johns, based on the DC Comics character the Flash. The series premiered on The CW television network in the United States on October 7, 2014, and ran for nine seasons until May 24, 2023. The series is a spin-off from Arrow, and set in the same fictional universe.

The following is a list of characters who have appeared in the series. Many of the characters appearing in the series are based on DC Comics characters.

== Overview ==
Legend
= Main cast (credited)
= Recurring cast (4+)
= Guest cast (1-3)

| Character | Actor | Seasons | | | | | | | | |
| Character | Actor | 1 | 2 | 3 | 4 | 5 | 6 | 7 | 8 | 9 |
Main characters
| Barry Allen / The Flash (Note: Gustin also portrays Hannibal Bates / Everyman disguised as the Earth-1 version in season one, Barry Allen's Earth-2 doppelgänger in season two and Barry Allen's time remnant Savitar in season three.) | Grant Gustin | Main | Main | Main | Main | Main | Main | Main | Main | Main |
| Savitar | Grant Gustin | | | Main | | Guest | | | | Guest (Note: Gustin did not play the role of Savitar in Season 9; an unknown extra played Savitar in costume.) |
| Iris West-Allen (Note: Patton also portrays Hannibal Bates / Everyman disguised as the Earth-1 version in season one, and Iris West-Allen's Earth-2 doppelgänger in season two.) | Candice Patton | Main | Main | Main | Main | Main | Main | Main | Main | Main |
| Caitlin Snow | Danielle Panabaker (Note: Panabaker also portrays Hannibal Bates / Everyman disguised as the Earth-1 version in season one, and Killer Frost's Earth-2 doppelgänger in season two.) | Main | Main | Main | Main | Main | Main | Main | Main | Guest |
| Killer Frost / Frost | Danielle Panabaker | | Guest | Recurring | Recurring | Main | Main | Main | Main | Guest |
| Khione | Danielle Panabaker | | | | | | | | Guest | Main |
| Eddie Thawne / "Malcolm Gilmore" / Cobalt Blue (Note: Cosnett also portrays Hannibal Bates / Everyman disguised as his character in season one.) | Rick Cosnett | Main | Guest | Guest | | | | | Guest | Recurring |
| Cisco Ramon / Vibe / Mecha-Vibe (Note: Valdes also portrays his character's Earth-2 doppelgänger Reverb in season two, and Echo of Earth-19 in season six.) | Carlos Valdes | Main | Main | Main | Main | Main | Main | Main | | |
| Eobard Thawne / Reverse-Flash (Note: Cavanagh also portrays Hannibal Bates / Everyman disguised as his character.) | Matt Letscher | Recurring | Recurring | Guest | | | | | Guest | Guest |
| Eobard Thawne / Reverse-Flash | Tom Cavanagh | Main | Guest (Note: Cavanagh is still enrolled in the main cast, but his role as Eobard Thawne in the second and fourth seasons was in a guest capacity.) | | Guest | Main | Recurring | Guest (Note: Cavanagh is credited in the 'special appearance by' bill in "Heart of the Matter, Part 2" for the role of Eobard Thawne.) | Recurring | Guest |
| Harrison "Harry" Wells (Earth-2) | Tom Cavanagh | | Main | Recurring | Main | Guest | Recurring | Guest | | |
| Harrison "H.R" Wells (Earth-19) | Tom Cavanagh | | | Main | | | | Guest | | |
| Harrison Sherloque Wells (Earth-221) | Tom Cavanagh | | | | | Main | Guest | Guest | | |
| Harrison Nash Wells | Tom Cavanagh | | | | | | Main (Note: Cavanagh portrays Nash in only one episode of season 7, but the actor is still listed as the main cast.) | Main | | |
| Harrison Wells (Earth-1, Earth Prime) | Tom Cavanagh | Guest | | | | | | Main (Note: As Harrison Wells, Cavanagh is credited as a main character through episode "Mother".) | | Guest |
| Joe West (Note: Martin also portrays Joseph West's Earth-2 doppelgänger in season two, and Ralph Dibny disguised as the Earth-1 version in season four.) | Jesse L. Martin | Main | Main | Main | Main | Main | Main | Main | Main | Recurring |
| Wally West / Kid Flash | Keiynan Lonsdale | | Main (Note: Lonsdale is credited as a series regular in all of his other appearances but as a special guest star in "We Are the Flash".) | Main | Main | Guest | Guest | | | Guest |
| Clifford DeVoe / Thinker | Neil Sandilands | | | | Main | | | | | |
| Ralph Dibny / Elongated Man | Hartley Sawyer | | | | Recurring | Main | Main | Stand-in | | |
| Cecile Horton / Virtue | Danielle Nicolet | Guest | | Recurring | Recurring | Main | Main | Main | Main | Main |
| Nora West-Allen / XS | Jessica Parker Kennedy | | | | Recurring | Main | | Recurring | Recurring | Guest |
| Orlin Dwyer / Cicada | Chris Klein | | | | | Main | | | | |
| Mar Novu / Monitor | LaMonica Garrett | | | | | Guest | Main | | | |
| Mobius / Anti-Monitor | LaMonica Garrett | | | | | | Main | | | |
| Eva McCulloch / Mirror Monarch | Efrat Dor | | | | | | Main | Main | | |
| Allegra Garcia | Kayla Compton | | | | | | Recurring | Main | Main | Main |
| Chester P. Runk | Brandon McKnight | | | | | | Guest | Main | Main | Main |
| Mark Blaine / Chillblaine | Jon Cor | | | | | | | Recurring | Recurring | Main |
Recurring characters
| Nora Allen | Michelle Harrison | Recurring | Guest | Guest | | Guest | Guest | | Guest | Guest |
| Speed Force | Michelle Harrison | | Guest | Guest | | | Guest | Recurring | Guest | Guest |
| Joan Williams | Michelle Harrison | | | | | | Guest | Guest | Guest | Guest |
| David Singh | Patrick Sabongui | Recurring | Recurring | Guest | Recurring | Recurring | Recurring | Guest | Guest | Guest |
| Henry Allen (Earth-1) | John Wesley Shipp | Recurring | Recurring | Guest | | Guest | | | | Guest |
| Jay Garrick / Flash (Earth-3) | John Wesley Shipp | | Recurring (Note: Jay appeared in a mask before the episode "The Race of His Life".) | Recurring | Guest | | Guest | Guest | Guest | Guest |
| Barry Allen / Flash (Earth-90) | John Wesley Shipp | | | | | Guest | Guest | | | |
| Oliver Queen / The Hood / Arrow / Green Arrow / Spectre | Stephen Amell | Recurring | Guest | Guest | Guest | Guest | Guest | | | Guest |
| Ronnie Raymond / Firestorm / Deathstorm | Robbie Amell | Recurring | Guest | Guest | | | | | Guest | |
| Leonard Snart / Captain Cold (Earth-1) | Wentworth Miller | Recurring | Guest | Guest | | | | | | |
| Leo Snart (Earth-X) | Wentworth Miller | | | | Guest | | | | | |
| General Wade Eiling | Clancy Brown | Recurring | | | | | | | | |
| Mason Bridge | Roger Howarth | Recurring | | | | | | | | |
| Hartley Rathaway / Pied Piper | Andy Mientus | Guest | Guest | | | | Guest | | | Recurring |
| Martin Stein / Firestorm | Victor Garber | Recurring | Recurring | Guest | Guest | | | | | Guest |
| Linda Park (Earth-1) | Malese Jow | Recurring | Guest | | | | | | | |
| Linda Park / Doctor Light (Earth-2) | Malese Jow | | Guest | | | | | | | |
| Kendra Saunders / Hawkgirl | Ciara Renée | Guest | Recurring | | | | | | | |
| Tina McGee | Amanda Pays | Guest | Recurring | | | | | | | |
| Hunter Zolomon / Zoom | Teddy Sears | | Recurring | Guest | | Guest | | | | Guest |
| Patty Spivot | Shantel VanSanten | | Recurring | | | | | | | |
| Francine West | Vanessa A. Williams | | Recurring | Guest | | | | | | Guest |
| Jesse Wells / Jesse Quick | Violett Beane | | Recurring | Recurring | Guest | | | | | |
| Julian Albert / Alchemy | Tom Felton | | | Recurring | | | | | | |
| Cynthia / Gypsy | Jessica Camacho | | | Recurring | Recurring | Guest | | | | |
| Tracy Brand | Anne Dudek | | | Recurring | | | | | | |
| Gregory Wolfe | Richard Brooks | Guest (Note: Anthony Harrison portrays Gregory Wolfe in season one's "Tricksters".) | | | Recurring | | | | | |
| Marlize DeVoe | Kim Engelbrecht | | | | Recurring | | | | | |
| Matthew Norvok | Mark Sweatman | | | | Recurring | Guest | Guest | Guest | | |
| Sharon Finkel | Donna Pescow | | | | Recurring | | | | | |
| Amunet Black | Katee Sackhoff | | | | Recurring | | Guest | | | |
| Officer "Jonesy" Jones | Klarc Wilson | | | | Guest | Recurring | | | | |
| Trevor Shinick | Everick Golding | | | | | Recurring | | | | |
| Vanessa Ambres | Lossen Chambers | | | | | Recurring | | | | |
| Grace Gibbons / Cicada II | Islie Hirvonen | | | | | Recurring | | | | |
| Grace Gibbons / Cicada II | Sarah Carter | | | | | Recurring | | | | |
| Kamilla Hwang | Victoria Park | | | | | Recurring | Recurring | Recurring | | |
| Ramsey Rosso / Bloodwork | Sendhil Ramamurthy | | | | | | Recurring | | | Guest |
| Daisy Korber | Stephanie Izsak | | | | | | Recurring | Recurring | Recurring | Recurring |
| Esperanza Garcia / Ultraviolet | Alexa Barajas | | | | | | Recurring | Guest | Guest | |
| Alexa Rivera / Fuerza | Sara Garcia | | | | | | | Recurring | Guest | |
| Bashir Malik / Psych | Ennis Esmer | | | | | | | Recurring | Guest | |
| Deon Owens | Christian Magby | | | | | | | Recurring | Recurring | |
| Kristen Kramer | Carmen Moore | | | | | | | Recurring | Recurring | Recurring |
| Sue Dearbon | Natalie Dreyfuss | | | | | | Guest | Guest | Recurring | |
| Despero | Tony Curran | | | | | | | | Recurring | |
| Taylor Downs | Rachel Drance | | | | | | | | Recurring | Recurring |
| Mona Taylor / Queen | Agam Darshi | | | | | | | | Recurring | |
| Tinya Wazzo / Phantom Girl | Mika Abdalla | | | | | | | | Recurring | |
| Meena Dhawan / Fast Track | Kausar Mohammed | | | | | | | | Recurring | |
| Owen Mercer / Captain Boomerang | Richard Harmon | | | | | | | | | Recurring |
| Ryan Wilder / Red Death / Batwoman | Javicia Leslie | | | | | | | | Guest | Recurring |
| Andrea Wozzeck / Fiddler | Magda Apanowicz | | | | | | | | | Recurring |

== Main characters ==
=== Barry Allen / Flash ===
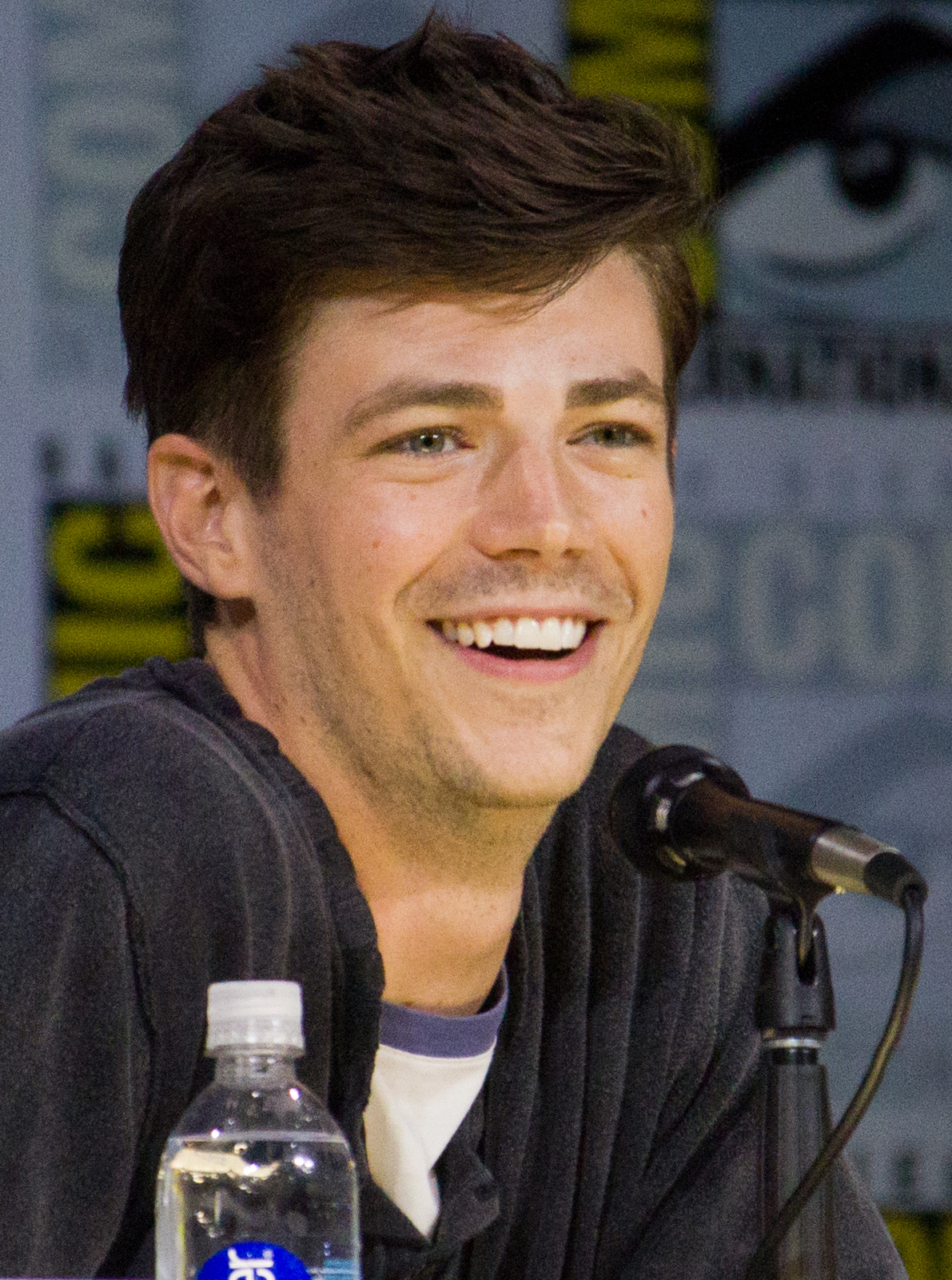
Grant Gustin

Bartholomew Henry "Barry" Allen (portrayed by Grant Gustin; seasons 1–9) is the main protagonist of the series. He is an awkward assistant crime-scene investigator (CSI) for the Central City Police Department (CCPD) who moonlights as the Flash. Barry is traumatized as a child when his mother Nora is murdered by the Reverse-Flash and his father Henry is framed for the crime. Barry tries to discover what happened that night. He first appears in Arrow, personally investigating a superhuman-related crime in Starling City. Barry is a fan of the Arrow's exploits and learns Oliver Queen is the vigilante; they become good friends. Sometime after Barry returns to Central City, he is struck in his laboratory by lightning which was affected by dark matter from the explosion of the S.T.A.R. Labs particle accelerator. Logan Williams portrays Barry as a child (recurring: season 1; guest: season 2).

==== Savitar ====
Savitar (also portrayed by Grant Gustin: seasons 3 and 5; performed by Andre Tricoteux; recurring: season 3; archive footage: season 5; guest: season 9; and voiced by Tobin Bell in exosuit; recurring: season 3; archive footage: season 5; guest: season 9) is a temporal duplicate of Barry from a possible future who travels back in time and becomes embedded in a bootstrap paradox. He serves as the main antagonist of season three.

=== Iris West-Allen ===
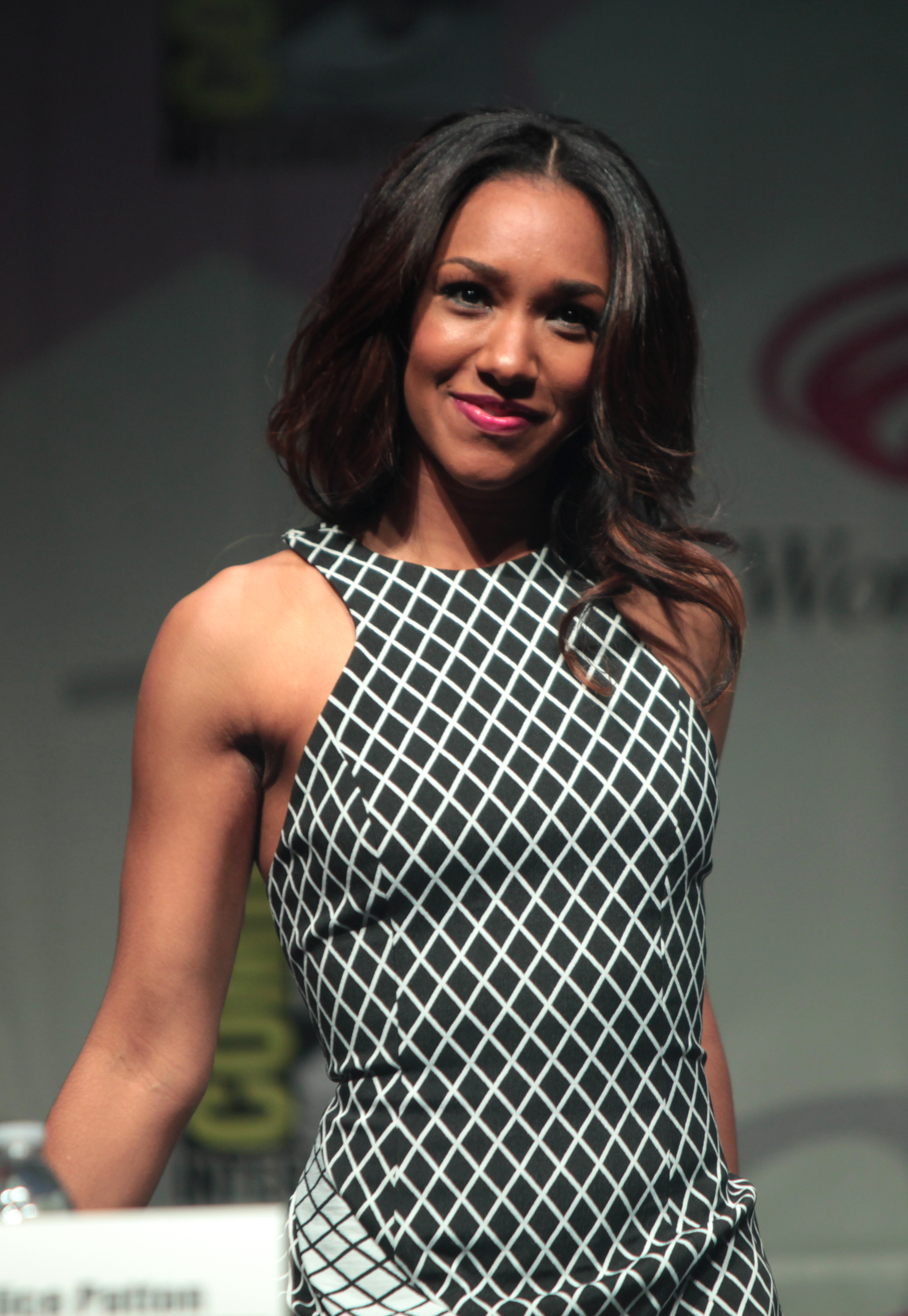
Candice Patton

Iris Ann West-Allen (portrayed by Candice Patton; seasons 1–9) is a reporter and the daughter of Joe, the wife of Barry, and head of Central City Citizen Media.

=== Caitlin Snow ===
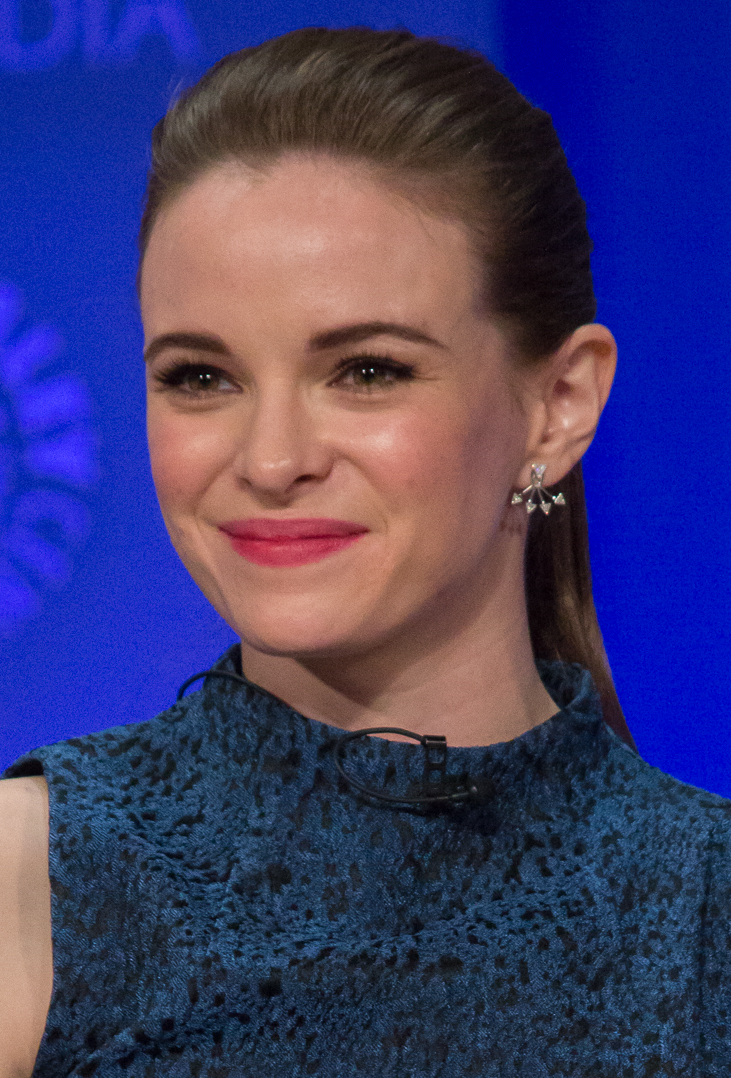
Danielle Panabaker

Dr. Caitlin Snow (portrayed by Danielle Panabaker; main: seasons 1–9) is a bioengineer who works at S.T.A.R. Labs, the daughter of scientists Thomas Snow and Carla Tannhauser, and the wife of Ronnie Raymond. She temporarily shares her body with an alter-ego named Killer Frost, and is later temporarily "replaced" with a new personality named Khione.

- In the Reverse-Flashpoint timeline, Caitlin dates Marcus Ficus.

==== Killer Frost / Frost ====
Killer Frost (portrayed by Danielle Panabaker; seasons 2–9) is Caitlin's violent metahuman alter-ego who was inadvertently created by Thomas during his experiments to treat Caitlin's ALS gene. In later seasons, she works alongside Team Flash as just "Frost". After being hit by Mirror Monarch's mirror gun, she and Caitlin split into two bodies. Frost briefly transforms into Hellfrost and gives her life in the fight against Deathstorm.

- Panabaker also portrays Caitlin's and Killer Frost's Earth-2 doppelgänger, a metahuman villainess who is married to Deathstorm (Ronnie Raymond of Earth-2) and works for Zoom. She did not finish medical school and became a criminal. After Earth-2's particle accelerator explosion, she developed cryokinesis (the ability to manipulate ice) and became unable to touch anyone without killing them. Her hair turned white and her lips and eyes blue.
- In the Reverse-Flashpoint timeline, Frost is dating Mark.

==== Khione ====
Khione (portrayed by Danielle Panabaker; season 9) is a new personality and a "third Snow sister" in Caitlin's body who emerges from the Consciousness Resurrection Chamber after its malfunction. She initially uses the alias Snow. She has only one biometric signature, making her neither human nor metahuman, and is later described as a goddess. Her powers connect her to the natural world, allowing her to reconstruct organisms, purge unnatural cells, and detect life. At the end of the series, she ascends to become the protector of the natural order and returns her body to Caitlin.

=== Eddie Thawne / Malcolm Gilmore / Cobalt Blue ===
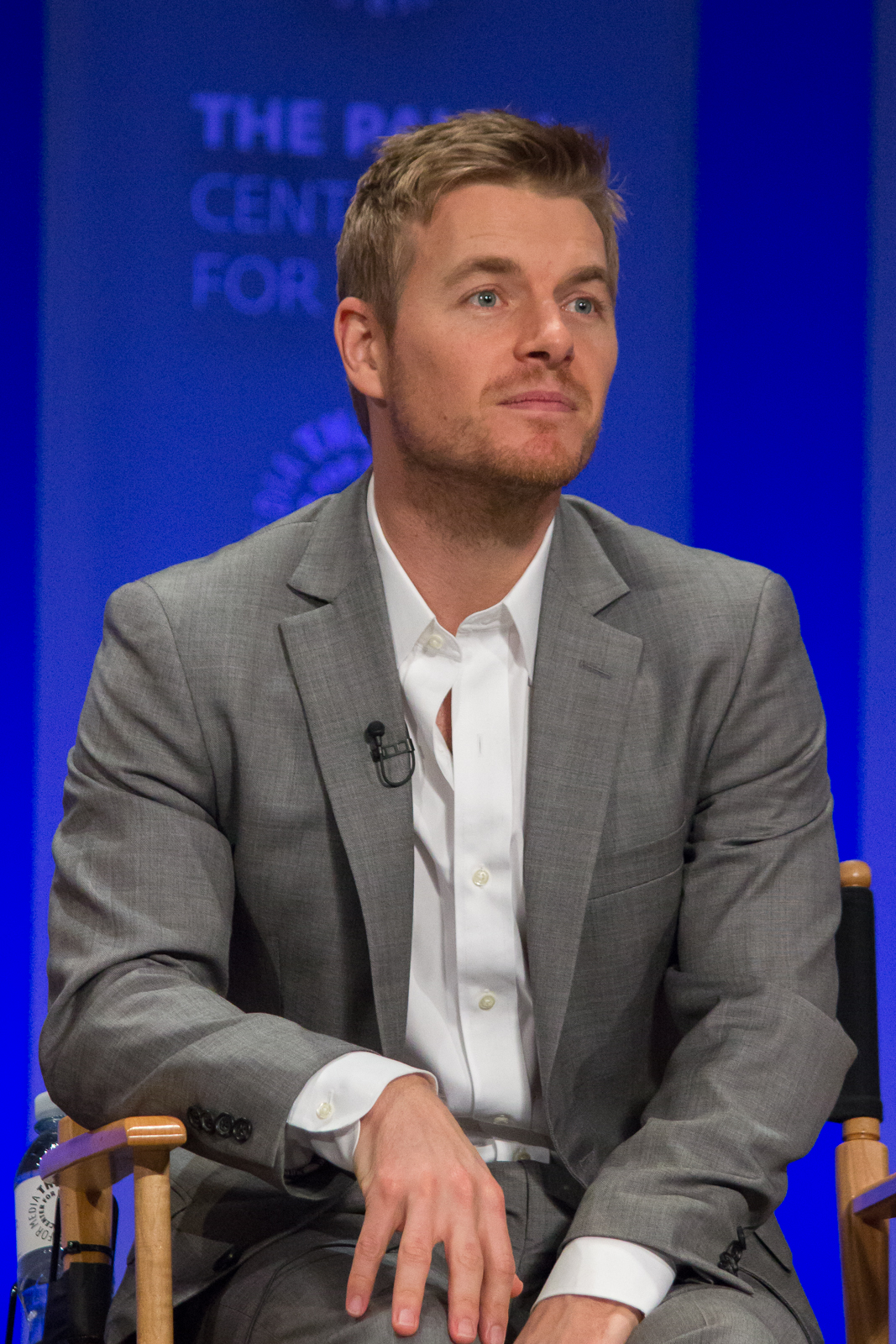
Rick Cosnett

Edward "Eddie" Thawne (portrayed by Rick Cosnett; main: season 1; recurring: season 9; guest: seasons 2, 3 and 8) is a CCPD detective who is a romantic interest for Iris, a colleague of Barry and Joe, and an ancestor of Eobard.

In season one, Eddie transferred from Keystone City. He is initially jealous because of Barry's childhood bond with Iris and suspicious despite denials, though Barry and Eddie do eventually end up good friends. Eddie teaches Barry how to box which (in addition to Oliver Queen's training) helps Barry be a capable combatant. Eddie initially sees the Flash as a menace and heads a task force dedicated to the Flash's capture, but he changes his perception due a near-death experience with the Reverse-Flash and even assisted the Flash. He later learns of Barry's secret identity and helps in an investigation of Wells as the Reverse-Flash who turns out to be his descendant. Eddie is disillusioned that Iris may eventually marry Barry until a conversation with Martin Stein when he realizes the future is not set and chooses to stop the Reverse-Flash by sacrificing himself to erase Eobard from the timeline, and his body is sucked into a wormhole.

In season nine, Eddie is resurrected as "Dr. Malcolm Gilmore" in 2049 by the Negative Speed Force. After regaining his memories, Eddie is manipulated into believing that he lost his chance for a family with Iris and is tempted as a new avatar for the Negative Speed Force, calling himself Cobalt Blue. However, he agrees to co-exist with Barry. With Eddie being alive, he will fulfill his destiny to his family bloodline that would ultimately conceive Eobard.

Cosnett was originally slated to portray Jay Garrick in the pilot before the character was changed to Eddie Thawne. Many speculated his character to be the Reverse-Flash in disguise due to his name and appearance.

=== Cisco Ramon / Vibe / Mecha-Vibe ===
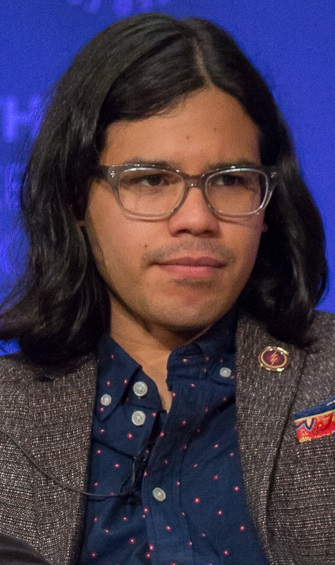
Carlos Valdes

Francisco Baracus "Cisco" Ramon (portrayed by Carlos Valdes; seasons 1–7) is a mechanical engineering genius who works at S.T.A.R. Labs. Since season two, he operates as the superhero Vibe using metahuman visions and the ability to create breaches to other places until season five. His abilities are temporarily restored during season six for the Crisis. In season seven, he uses technology to mimic his former abilities as Mecha-Vibe and leaves Central City for a job at A.R.G.U.S. with his girlfriend Kamilla Hwang.

- Valdes also portrays Cisco's Earth-2 doppelgänger Reverb, a metahuman villain, enforcer for Zoom and intimidating wrangler of Killer Frost and Deathstorm. He has more experience and control of his powers than his Earth-1 self, and can manipulate sonic vibrations to create powerful shock waves of considerable strength. His visor technology is used to modify Vibe's own visor.
- Valdes also portrays Cisco's Earth-19 doppelgänger Echo, a hacker who murdered Gypsy. Breacher and his fellow Collectors thought that Cisco was responsible, but they eventually discover the true culprit and arrest him.

=== Harrison Wells ===
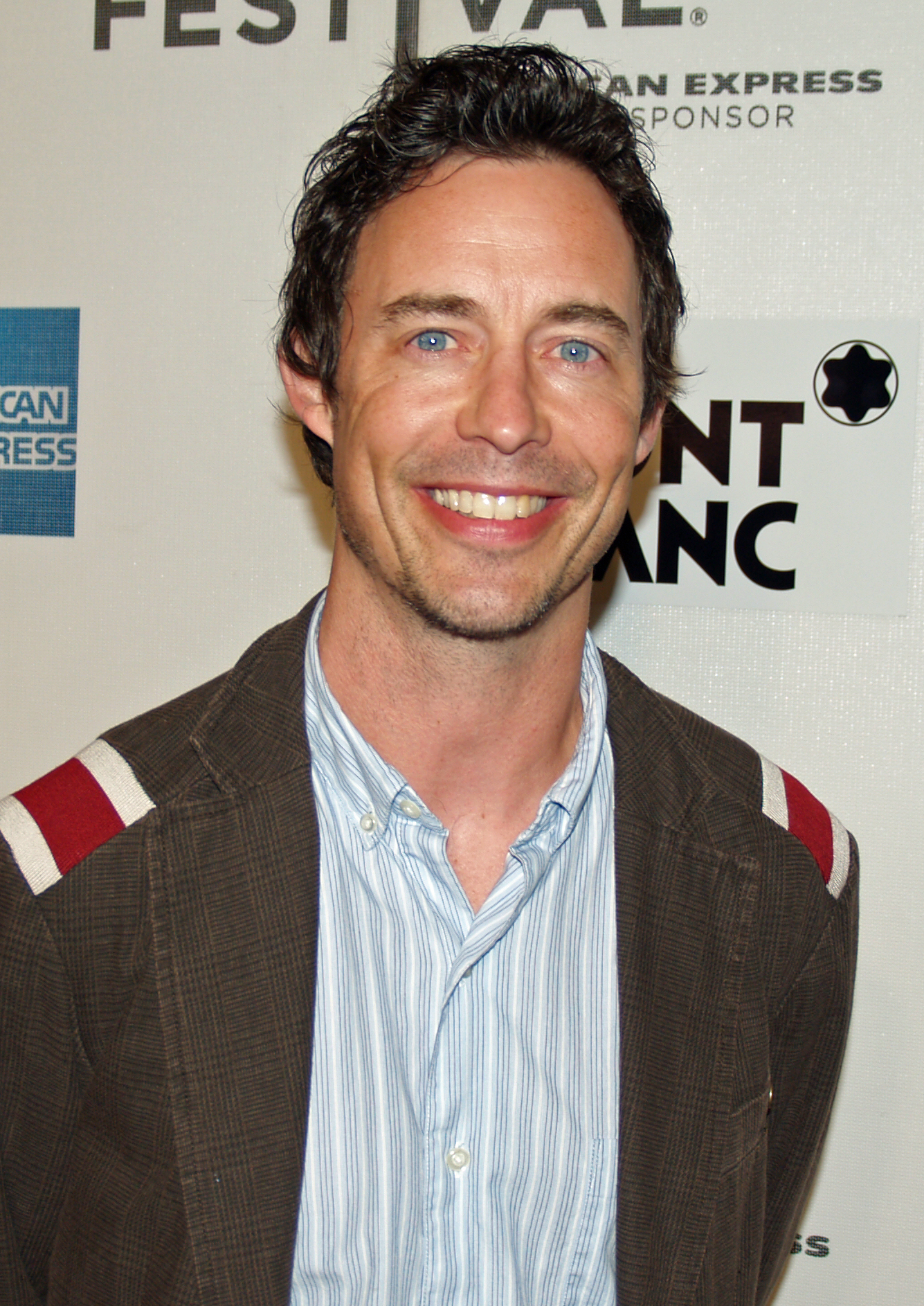
Tom Cavanagh portrays both Harrison Wells and Eobard Thawne in the series

Dr. Harrison Wells (portrayed by Tom Cavanagh; main: seasons 1–7; guest: season 9) is, on most Earths in the multiverse, the mind and money behind S.T.A.R. Labs in Central City. He is an original character created for the series.

=== Eobard Thawne / Reverse-Flash ===
Professor Eobard Thawne (portrayed by Tom Cavanagh in the form of Harrison Wells; main: seasons 1–6; recurring: season 8; guest: seasons 7 and 9; and by Matt Letscher in his original likeness; guest: seasons 1–3, 8–9) is a time-traveling criminal, a future descendant of Eddie Thawne, and the archenemy of Barry Allen.

=== Joe West ===
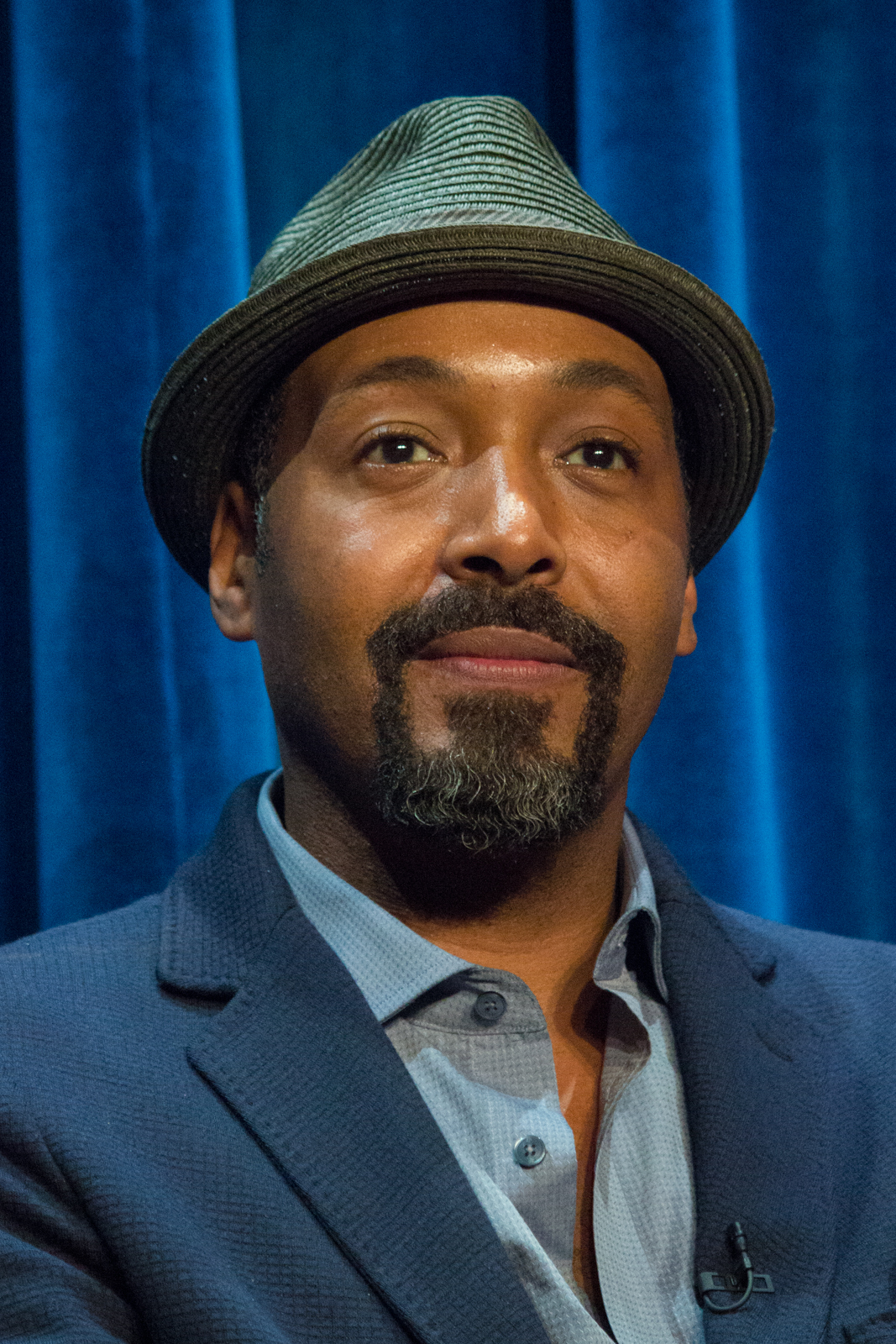
Jesse L. Martin

Joseph "Joe" West (portrayed by Jesse L. Martin; main: seasons 1–8; recurring: season 9) is a detective for the CCPD, father to Iris, Wally and Jenna, legal guardian of Barry, and boyfriend (later fiancé) of Cecile.

- Martin also portrays Joe's Earth-2 doppelgänger Joseph West, a lounge singer who does not share a father-son bond with Barry and blames him for Iris becoming a police officer.

=== Wally West / Kid Flash ===
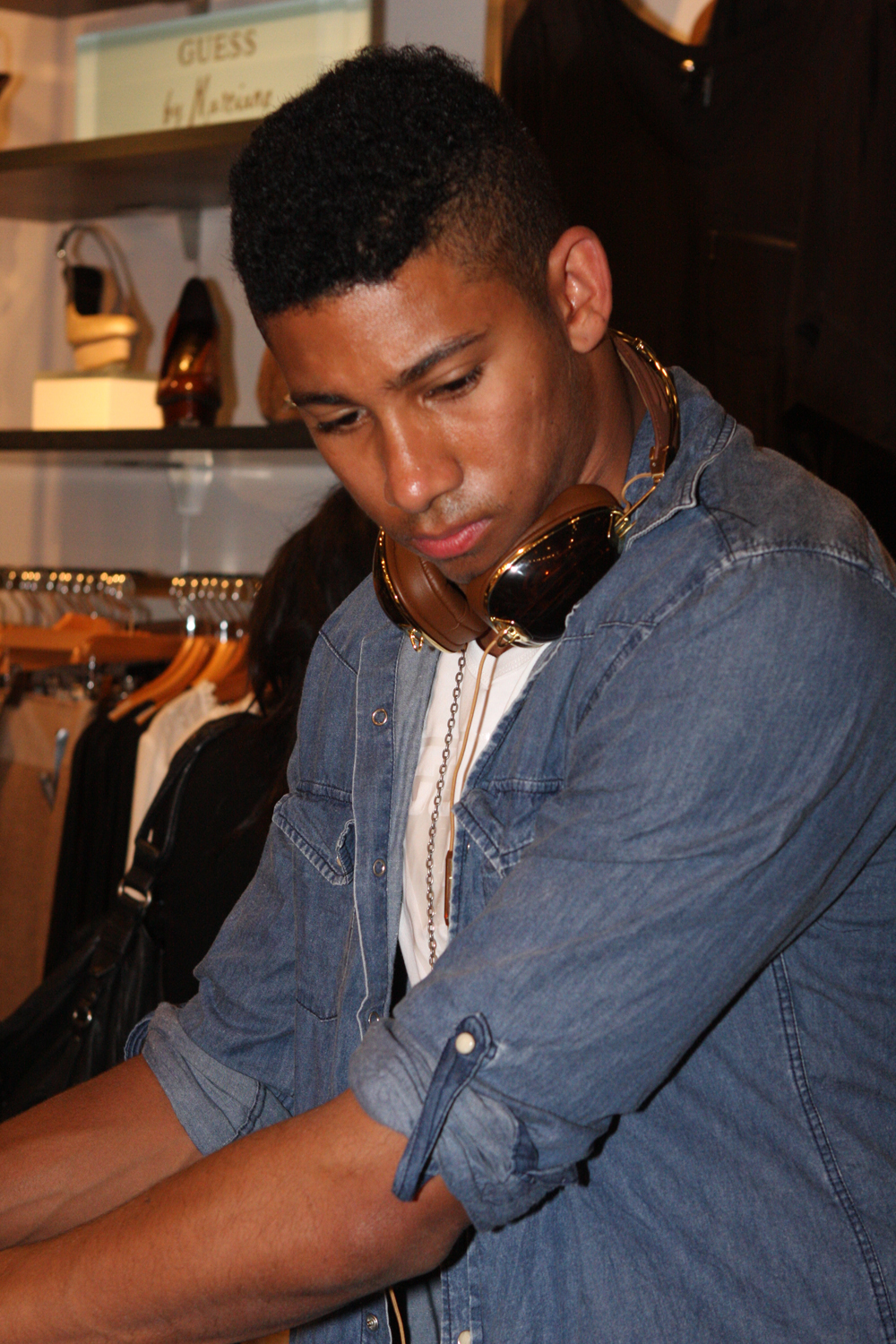
Keiynan Lonsdale

Wallace "Wally" West (portrayed by Keiynan Lonsdale; main: seasons 2–4; guest: seasons 5, 6 and 9) is Iris's previously unknown brother and Joe's son, described as "a bit of a wayward kid who has some attitude problems and some authority issues and is quick with a sassy remark". He develops speedster abilities (which originated from the Flashpoint timeline) through Doctor Alchemy and begins assisting Barry as Kid Flash.

Lonsdale also stars as the character on Legends of Tomorrow and originally auditioned to portray Jefferson Jackson. He did not return full-time for season five due to wanting to seek other acting opportunities; he later made guest appearances in seasons six and nine. Wally was always intended to be the son of Joe and brother of Iris, which differs from the character's comic history, as the producers felt it "weird" for second seasons of television series to introduce previously unmentioned cousins of established characters. Wally inspired another character of the same name, nicknamed Ace West, following DC's New 52 relaunch.

=== Clifford DeVoe / Thinker ===
Clifford DeVoe / Thinker (portrayed by Neil Sandilands; season 4) was a mild-mannered professor turned egomaniac metahuman with super intelligence, who seeks to fix all that he deems wrong with humanity. He and his wife Marlize create the "Thinking Cap" and exploit the particle accelerator to power it, but its dark matter drains energy from his body and leaves him with ALS. They build a hoverchair to enhance him, but he develops a god complex, becoming apathetic and emotionless. He orchestrates Barry's release from the Speed Force to create 12 specific metahumans, who he then steals the bodies of to gain their powers. He serves as season four's big bad.

- Kendrick Sampson, Sugar Lyn Beard, Miranda MacDougall, Arturo Del Puerto, and Hartley Sawyer portray DeVoe in different host bodies.

=== Cecile Horton / Virtue ===
Cecile Horton (portrayed by Danielle Nicolet; main: seasons 5–9; recurring: seasons 3–4; guest: season 1) is a Central City district attorney who would occasionally offer Joe legal advice. She and Joe begin dating and eventually get engaged. While pregnant with his daughter Jenna, she becomes a metahuman and develops empathic abilities. Because of this, she begins specializing in metahuman cases. While assisting Team Citizen and serving on Team Flash, she develops telekinesis and later adopts the codename Virtue with a costume inspired by Jenna's drawings. She also has an older daughter named Joanie.

=== Ralph Dibny / Elongated Man ===
Ralph Dibny (portrayed by Hartley Sawyer; main: seasons 5–6; recurring: season 4) is a private investigator specializing in infidelity cases and metahuman with the ability to stretch his body to superhuman lengths and sizes, also allowing him to morph into other people. He was previously a detective for the CCPD until Barry exposed him for planting evidence. He acquires his powers through exposure to dark matter (which was set up by the Thinker) and stabilizes at S.T.A.R. Labs, where Barry decides to give him a second chance. He becomes an asset to Team Flash known as the Elongated Man. He later develops a partnership with Sue Dearbon.

=== Nora West-Allen / XS ===
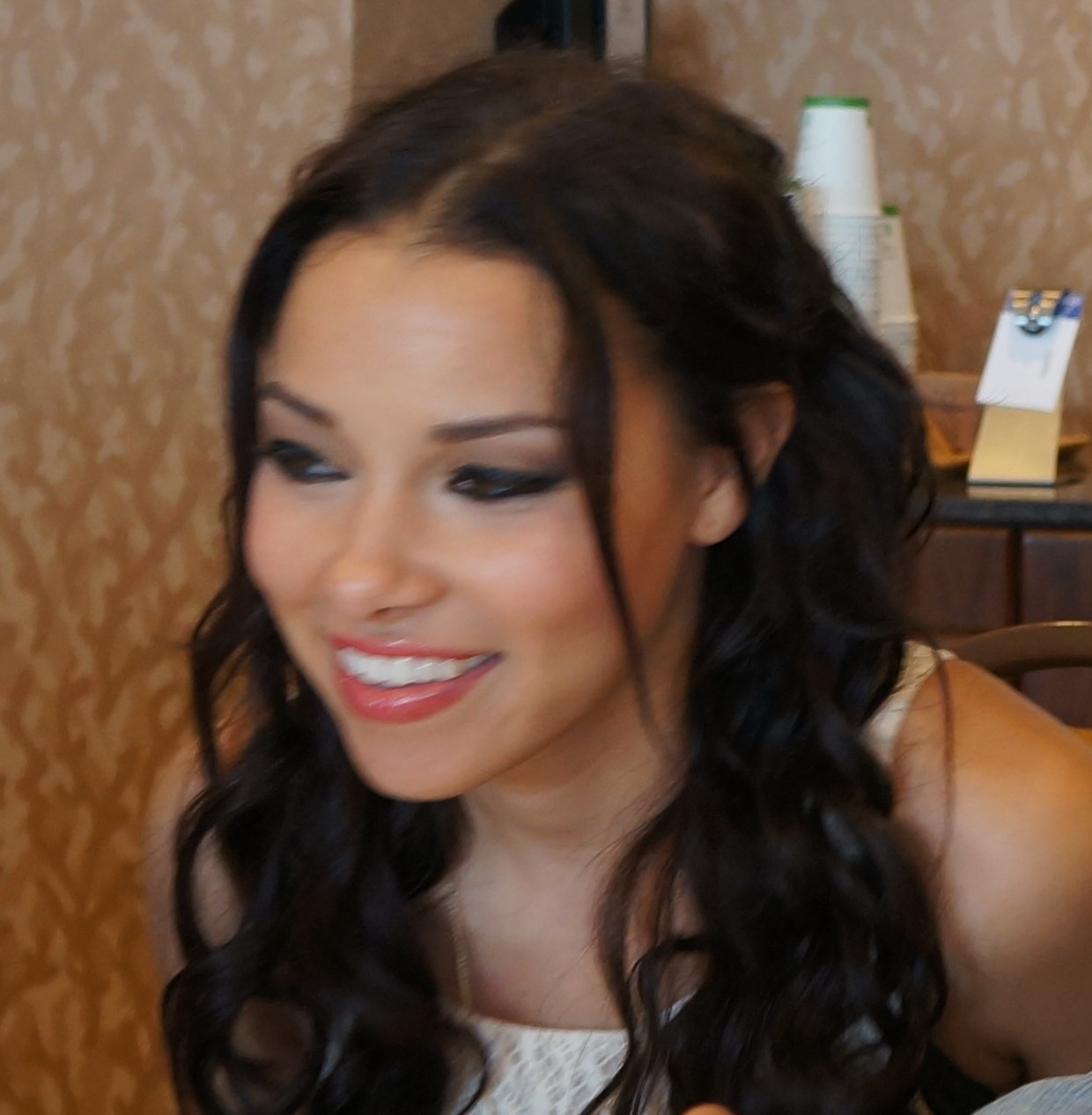
Jessica Parker Kennedy

Nora West-Allen (portrayed by Jessica Parker Kennedy; main: season 5; recurring: seasons 4, 7 and 8; guest: season 9) is introduced as a mysterious girl with super-speed. She is first seen at Barry and Iris's wedding and interacts with Team Flash throughout the season. After helping Barry stop the Thinker's satellite, she reveals herself as his and Iris's daughter from 2049. Since she is from the future, certain actions in the present change major parts of her history over the course of the series. Her lightning is yellow and purple, referencing both of her parents' lightnings. She is established as a lesbian.

=== Orlin Dwyer / Cicada ===
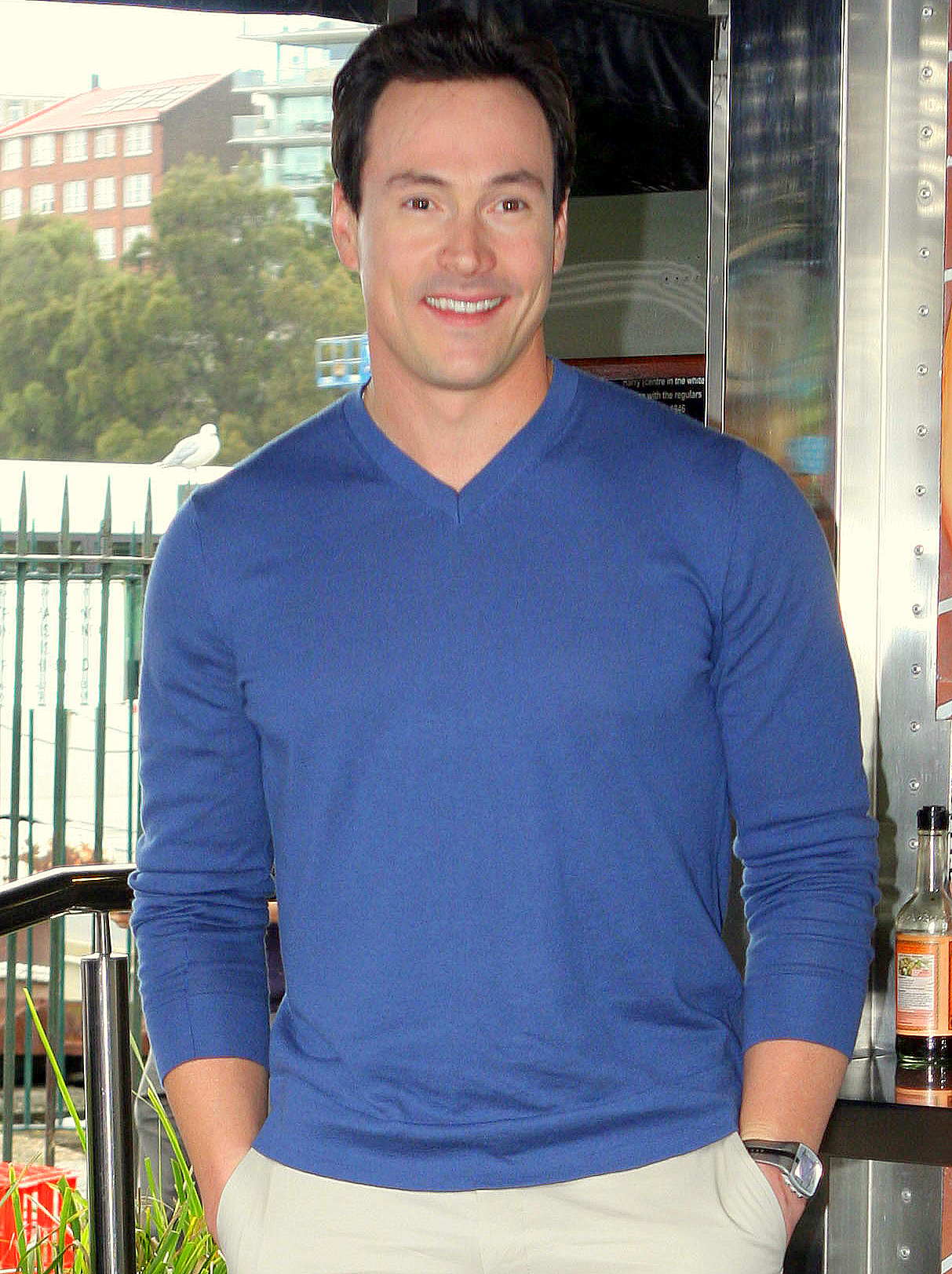
Chris Klein

Orlin Dwyer (portrayed by Chris Klein; season 5) is one of the two main antagonists of season five. He gets his abilities after being struck by a fragment of DeVoe's satellite, which also leaves his niece Grace in a coma. Enraged by this and the loss of her mother (his sister) to an earlier metahuman incident, he vows to exterminate all metahumans using a telekinetic dagger that can nullify their abilities, and is dubbed "Cicada" by Team Flash. Secretly, he and Grace are aided by Dr. Ambres.

=== Mar Novu / Monitor ===
Monitor (portrayed by LaMonica Garrett; main: season 6; guest: season 5) is a multiversal being who uses the Book of Destiny to test Earths to see if they are capable of facing an upcoming crisis. Notably, he destroys Earth-90 and gives the Book of Destiny to John Deegan to test Earth-1's heroes.

=== Mobius / Anti-Monitor ===
The Anti-Monitor (portrayed by LaMonica Garrett; season 6) is a multiversal being who plots to destroy all the Earths in the multiverse with his anti-matter powers so that only the anti-matter universe remains.

=== Eva McCulloch / Mirror Monarch ===
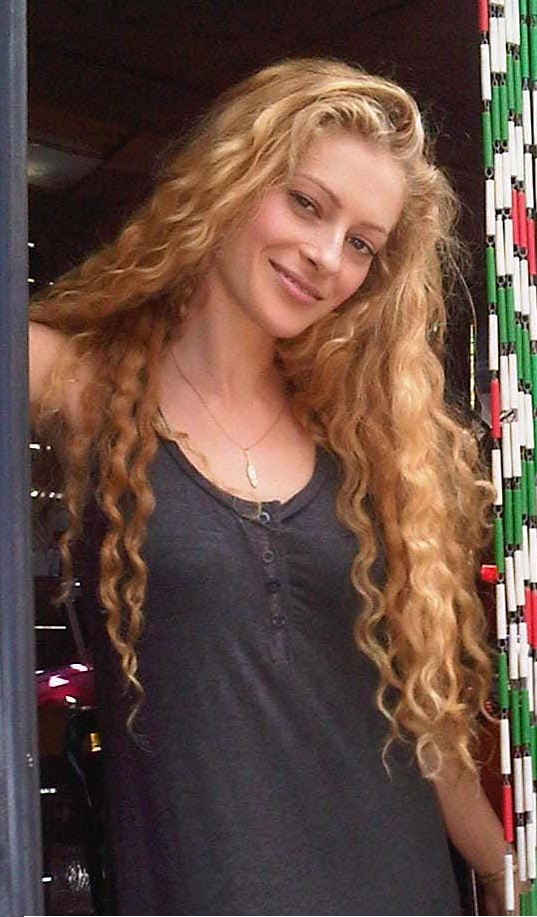
Efrat Dor

Eva McCulloch (portrayed by Efrat Dor; seasons 6–7) is a quantum engineer, co-founder of McCulloch Technologies, and the wife of Joseph Carver. She has been trapped in the Mirrorverse since the particle acceleration explosion, and begins pulling people in (notably Iris) and creates mirror imposters of those people to aid in her escape so that she may have revenge against Carver for abandoning her. She later discovers that she herself is a mirror duplicate and that the real Eva died during the explosion, and plots to replace everybody with mirror duplicates as Mirror Monarch.

She is based on the DC Comics character Evan McCulloch / Mirror Master and is the main antagonist of the second half of season six and the first three episodes of season seven.

=== Allegra Garcia ===
Allegra Garcia (portrayed by Kayla Compton; main: seasons 7–9; recurring: season 6) is a young metahuman with abilities based on the electromagnetic spectrum. As a child, she was incarcerated at Iron Heights for involvement with a gang called the Arañas alongside her cousin Esperanza, with whom she has a strained relationship. She joins Team Flash and Team Citizen after Barry and Cecile prove her innocence in a murder case and bonds with Nash after discovering that the latter was a father figure to her Earth-719 counterpart Maya. After much awkwardness, she dates Chester, who works to make her a superhero costume under the codename Wavelength.

- Compton also portrays Allegra's Earth-719 doppelgänger Maya, who traveled with Nash across the multiverse before dying during an expedition on Earth-13.
- In the Reverse-Flashpoint timeline, Allegra has broken up with Chester. Alex Danvers convinces them to rekindle their relationship.

=== Chester P. Runk ===
Chester P. Runk (portrayed by Brandon McKnight; main: seasons 7–9; guest: season 6) is a scientist with an online following who believes in keeping his code open-source. He meets Team Flash after accidentally opening a black hole that fuses with his consciousness. After Barry rescues him and Cecile helps him put his life back together, he begins assisting Team Flash as a tech specialist. After much awkwardness, he dates Allegra and makes her a superhero costume. At the end of the series, it is revealed that cosmic energy from the black hole bonded with him and that his genes contain a Consciousness-Honed Universally Neutralized Kerr anomaly, making him a metahuman.

- In the Reverse-Flashpoint timeline, Chester is friends with Ryan Choi and has broken up with Allegra.

=== Mark Blaine / Chillblaine ===
Mark Blaine / Chillblaine (portrayed by Jon Cor; main: season 9; recurring: seasons 7–8) is a former Ivo Laboratories scientist who was fired for creating a microchip that he used to enhance his cryogenic tech. Naming himself Chillblaine, he steals it back and frames Frost for a murder. However, his infatuation and continued run-ins with her prompt him to become a better person, and they begin dating. He falls into a depression when Frost passes fighting Deathstorm and dedicates himself to resurrecting her, and is infuriated when Khione emerges in Caitlin's body and chooses to live her own life. He briefly joins Red Death and the Rogues in exchange for Frost's resurrection, but ultimately rejoins Team Flash and eventually comes to terms with Frost's passing.

- In the Reverse-Flashpoint timeline, Mark and Frost are still together.

== Recurring characters ==
This is a list of recurring actors and the characters they portrayed in multiple episodes, which were significant roles, sometimes across multiple seasons. The characters are listed in order of appearance by the season in which they first appeared.

=== Introduced in season one ===
==== Gideon ====
Gideon (voiced by Morena Baccarin (uncredited); seasons 1–2 and 4–9) is an A.I. assistant created by Barry Allen in the original future timeline which somehow came to be used in Eobard Thawne's own plans. It is programmed to be loyal to both Barry and Eobard. Gideon is also shown to be loyal to Harry Wells, Clifford DeVoe, and Nora West-Allen.

- Another version of the character (voiced by Amy Pemberton) is the on-board navigational assistant of the Waverider.

==== Ronnie Raymond / Firestorm ====
Ronnie Raymond / Firestorm (portrayed by Robbie Amell; seasons 1–3 and 8) is an engineer at S.T.A.R. Labs and Caitlin Snow's fiancé, based on the DC Comics character of the same name who is half of Firestorm. He is thought to be dead in the particle accelerator explosion, saving his co-workers' lives. He survived the accident, which merged him with Martin Stein and the F.I.R.E.S.T.O.R.M. transmutation matrix, transforming the two into one pyrokinetic entity. Ronnie acts as Firestorm's body, with Stein primarily in control. The two eventually learn to control their shared powers, including an ability to separate at will. Like Caitlin, Cisco and Stein, Ronnie also becomes good friends with Barry Allen; he and Barry ultimately join forces with Oliver Queen to subdue the Reverse-Flash. Ronnie marries Caitlin. Ronnie sacrifices himself to stop the singularity above Central City while separating himself from Stein to keep him alive.

- Amell also portrays Ronnie Raymond / Deathstorm, the Earth-2 version of the character and Killer Frost's husband. He works alongside Killer Frost for Zoom. Ronnie is killed by Zoom for harming the Flash of Earth-1.

==== Oliver Queen / Green Arrow / Spectre ====
Oliver Queen / Green Arrow / Spectre (portrayed by Stephen Amell; seasons 1–6 and 9) is a former-playboy billionaire and politician who operates as a vigilante in Star City and is a friend of Barry Allen's. He helps Barry in hand-to-hand combat and other skills to turn Barry into a capable combatant with or without powers. He becomes the Spectre during the Crisis and guards the new multiverse. Amell stars as the character on Arrow.

- The Earth-2 version of his character died while his father Robert Queen became a vigilante called "The Hood" instead.
- Amell also portrays the Dark Arrow, the Earth-X version of the character.

==== General Wade Eiling ====
General Wade Eiling (portrayed by Clancy Brown; season 1) is a general with an interest in metahumans, who he wants to use for the U.S. Army, and has a history with S.T.A.R. Labs. Eiling learns of Barry's identity as the Flash, however, Thawne gives the general to Grodd to be placed under Grodd's control. After being freed by the Flash, he and Barry form a grudging respect despite their enmity.

==== Martin Stein ====
Martin Stein (portrayed by Victor Garber; seasons 1–4 and 9) is a nuclear physicist focused on transmutation and is half of Firestorm. He remains in control of Firestorm during the initial merging, though Ronnie Raymond occasionally takes control for brief moments. The two learn to control their powers and separate at will. After the Reverse-Flash's demise, Stein serves as Team Flash's scientific advisor and encourages Cisco to accept his metahuman powers. After finding that his body is too unstable to fully support the Firestorm matrix, he gains a new partner in Jefferson Jackson. After they join the Legends, he discovers that he now has a daughter, Lily, due to both Barry's and his own respective time-traveling actions; he never had a child due to his fear of being as neglectful as his father and his commitment to work in the previous timeline. Stein is killed when the heroes try to escape from Earth-X.

- The Earth-2 version of the character is one half of Deathstorm. Stein has not been released or listened to and he eventually stops talking altogether. He is killed by Zoom.

==== Nora Allen ====
Nora Allen (portrayed by Michelle Harrison; seasons 1–3, 5 and 7–9) is Barry Allen's mother and Henry Allen's wife. Although the Reverse-Flash was actually trying to kill the young Barry during the fight with the Flash's future self, Nora turns into the Reverse-Flash's target after young Barry was taken to safety, and later motivated Barry as the Flash. Her likeness is often adopted by the Speed Force.

- Harrison voices the Earth-2 version of the character, who remains alive and happy.

==== Gregory Wolfe ====
Gregory Wolfe (portrayed by Anthony Harrison in season 1, Richard Brooks in season 4) is the corrupt prison warden of Iron Heights Prison who has connections to Amunet Black. He oversees the incarceration of Kilgore. When Barry is framed for Clifford DeVoe's "murder" and sentenced to life at Iron Heights without possibility of parole, Warden Wolfe incarcerates Barry in Henry Allen's former cell. After his hidden camera enables him to figure out that Barry is the Flash, Wolfe has Barry transferred to Iron Heights' metahuman wing. While planning to sell Killgore, Mina Chayton, Hazard, and Dwarfstar to Amunet, Wolfe is killed by the Thinker while stealing the four metahumans' abilities. Mayor Van Buren believes that Wolfe died a hero until Iris's blog exposes his illegal activities. Wolfe is later succeeded by Del Toro.

==== Mason Bridge ====
Mason Bridge (portrayed by Roger Howarth; season 1) is a reporter at the Central City Picture News who mentors Iris West. He's suspicious of Eobard Thawne and finds evidence of Simon Stagg's murder. Mason is killed by the Reverse-Flash and all of his evidence erased, but his disappearance leads Barry and Joe to discover he was murdered for learning about Thawne. Iris begins looking into Mason's disappearance, but Eddie Thawne covers with a story to which Iris eventually learns the truth.

==== Linda Park ====
Linda Park (portrayed by Malese Jow; seasons 1–2) is a journalist for the Central City Picture News who befriends Iris West and Barry Allen. She briefly dates Barry and later briefly impersonated her own doppelgänger. The character was originally portrayed by Olivia Cheng in a cameo appearance on the series Arrow.

- Jow also portrays Doctor Light, the Earth-2 version of the character, based on the Kimiyo Hoshi version of the character. She is a thief who is very easily startled and paranoid and willing to do anything to stay out of Zoom's sights, including attempting murder so that she can take over her Earth-1 doppelgänger's life.

==== Hartley Rathaway / Pied Piper ====
Hartley Rathaway / Pied Piper (portrayed by Andy Mientus; seasons 1–2, 6 and 9) is an embittered genius who used to work at S.T.A.R. Labs. The particle accelerator explosion gave him superhuman hearing, but he needed custom-made hearing aids to help control his new power. He was also estranged from his parents after he came out. Following these, he developed sonic gloves and became a criminal calling himself the "Pied Piper". He is initially Cisco's rival as he was Thawne's former protégé. As a result of timeline changes, Hartley is an ally to Team Flash and reconciled with his parents. In the post-Crisis timeline, Hartley is a metahuman with sonic powers and an enemy to Team Flash since the Flash had destabilized his henchman/boyfriend Roderick Smith's molecules during one of their fights. After combining their powers to defeat Godspeed, Team Flash was able to save Roderick while Hartley forgave Barry. Later, Hartley's gauntlets are stolen by the Rogues, and he allies with Team Flash to retrieve them and defeat the Red Death.

==== Lisa Snart / Golden Glider ====
Lisa Snart / Golden Glider (portrayed by Peyton List; seasons 1–2) is an aspiring criminal and Leonard Snart's younger sister. She shares a mutual attraction with Cisco Ramon who she initially kidnapped for her brother and coerced into creating a gun that turns things into gold, but is genuinely fond of Cisco. Lisa later helped her brother free the metahuman criminals in the Pipeline. Lisa later sought Team Flash's help when her brother was found to be working for their abusive father Lewis Snart (later revealed to be due to her father threatening her life).

==== Mark Mardon / Weather Wizard ====
Mark Mardon / Weather Wizard (portrayed by Liam McIntyre; seasons 1, 2 and 5) is a criminal with the ability to control the weather of his surroundings. Having similar powers to his sibling Clyde, Mark returns to Central City seeking revenge on Joe West for killing his brother. He was being held in the S.T.A.R. Labs prison before being set free by Leonard Snart and offered a place in his crew the "Rogues". Mark also murdered Patty Spivot's father during a bank robbery with his brother months prior to the particle accelerator's explosion. He remains nursing his grudge against both Joe West and the Flash. His estranged daughter Joslyn Jackam / Weather Witch tries to kill him in prison, but he is saved by the Flash.

==== Leonard Snart / Captain Cold ====
Leonard Snart / Captain Cold (portrayed by Wentworth Miller; seasons 1–3) is the son of a police officer and Lisa Snart's brother who turns to crime. Snart is a cunning and intelligent bank robber who seeks to eliminate the Flash and steals a cryonic gun from S.T.A.R. Labs, a weapon Cisco created as a failsafe to stop the Flash. Snart and Mick Rory attempt to kill The Flash but fail, though the Flash is revealed to the world. He extorts the Flash's identity from Cisco and later becomes leader of his crew, which Barry dubs the "Rogues". Barry later asks Snart to assist the transport of metahumans from Central City to Lian Yu, for which Snart wants his criminal record erased. He double-crosses Barry by sabotaging the truck containing Mark Mardon, Kyle Nimbus, Roy Bivolo, Jake Simmons and Shawna Baez. Snart kills Simmons who he claims owed him money. Leonard is later extorted into working for his father Lewis Snart when he plants a bomb inside Lisa's head. After Team Flash successfully remove it, Leonard kills Lewis out of spite and is arrested for his father's murder. He is later broken out by Mardon to get revenge on Barry but declines and warns Barry of Mardon's plans. Snart also had a part in turning Sam Scudder and Rosa Dillon into metahumans. Barry later recruits Snart from a point in time where he was traveling with the Legends in an attempt to steal Dominator technology from A.R.G.U.S. The two succeed and Snart is returned to the Legends.

- The Earth-2 version of the character is the mayor of Central City.
- Miller also portrays Leo Snart, the Earth-X version of the character during "Crisis on Earth-X" crossover who operates as Citizen Cold. Leo is a vigilante and a member of the Freedom Fighters, a resistance movement against the New Reich in a Nazi-governed world; he is also the lover of Ray Terrill / The Ray. Leo later appears on Earth-1 where he helps Flash deal with Siren-X, a remnant of the New Reich who plans to detonate Fallout at the CCPD to avenge the Dark Arrow's death. During this time, Leo helps Barry cope with what DeVoe did with Elongated Man. After Siren-X is defeated and Fallout is in A.R.G.U.S. custody, Leo returns to Earth-X to marry Ray.
- Miller also voices the Leonard A.I. on Earth-74's Waverider.

==== Tina McGee ====
Tina McGee (portrayed by Amanda Pays; seasons 1–2) is a friend of Harrison Wells (Earth-1 version), she is the director of Mercury Labs and the designer of the tachyon devices which allows any object to move at the speed of light. McGee has run-ins with Eobard Thawne involving her tachyon equipment and eventually realizes Barry Allen is the Flash. Pays reprises the role from the 1990s TV series.

- Pays also makes an uncredited cameo appearance in "Crisis on Infinite Earths" via archival footage of the character's 1990 incarnation, which are seen as memories that the Flash of Earth-90 looked back on before the latter sacrificed himself to save the multiverse.

==== Mick Rory / Heat Wave ====
Mick Rory / Heat Wave (portrayed by Dominic Purcell; seasons 1–3) is an arsonist and accomplice of Leonard Snart who uses a heat gun developed by Cisco capable of burning almost anything. However, Mick's obsession for maximum destruction and failure to think causes tensions with Snart tempted to kill him.

==== John Diggle / Spartan ====
John Diggle / Spartan (portrayed by David Ramsey; seasons 1–9) is Oliver's best friend and teammate. Ramsey stars as the character on Arrow.

==== Kendra Saunders / Chay-Ara / Hawkgirl ====
Kendra Saunders / Chay-Ara / Hawkgirl (portrayed by Ciara Renée; seasons 1–2) is a young woman who has been repeatedly reincarnated over the centuries. When provoked, her ancient warrior persona manifests itself, along with wings that grow out of her back. She is a potential love interest for Cisco Ramon.

==== Felicity Smoak ====
Felicity Smoak (portrayed by Emily Bett Rickards; seasons 1–4) is an information-technology genius, a member of Oliver's team and later wife, and a good friend of Barry's. Rickards stars as the character on Arrow.

- Rickards also portrays the unnamed Earth-X version of the character, who is interned in a concentration camp under the Nazi regime.

==== David Singh ====
David Singh (portrayed by Patrick Sabongui; seasons 1–9) is introduced as a captain in the CCPD and the immediate superior officer to Barry Allen and Joe West. He has been a supportive captain while dealing with various antagonists (such as Zoom, DeVoe and both versions of Cicada). He reveals late in the series that he knows Barry is the Flash. When the Mayor promotes him to Chief of Police, Singh promotes Joe as his replacement.

- Sabongui also portrays the Earth-2 version of the character, who is a criminal.
- Sabongui also portrays a mirror clone of the character controlled by Eva McCulloch.

==== Henry Allen ====
Dr. Henry Allen (portrayed by John Wesley Shipp; seasons 1–3, 5 and 9) is the father of Barry Allen, the husband of Nora Allen, and the Earth-1 doppelgänger of Jay Garrick. Shipp previously portrayed Barry Allen in the 1990 television series. Henry was a respectable doctor before he was wrongfully convicted of murdering Nora and incarcerated in Iron Heights Prison after the Reverse-Flash framed him. Only Barry and later Joe West believed in his innocence. He learns that Barry is the Flash and is proud of his son. Henry serves as Barry's moral conscience in being a speedster wisely, thus keeping Barry from being tempted by personal gains. Henry is released from prison due to Thawne's confession to Nora's murder, but leaves Central City to seek a reclusive life as he believes that his presence could hold back Barry's duties as the Flash. He returns to counsel Barry and offer encouragement during his son's disastrous fights with Zoom and even joins S.T.A.R. Labs to help in Barry's fight to save Earth-1. Henry is killed by Zoom for Barry to relive the same tragedy with Nora killed by the Reverse-Flash. Following Henry's death, Jay takes over in mentoring Barry on power and responsibility.

- Shipp reprises his role of Barry Allen from the 1990 television series (Earth-90), a counterpart of Henry and Jay, in the crossovers "Elseworlds" and "Crisis on Infinite Earths". During "Crisis on Infinite Earths", Barry sacrifices himself to destroy the Anti-Monitor's anti-matter cannon.

==== Grodd ====
Grodd (voiced by David Sobolov; seasons 1–3, 5–6 and 9) is a hyper-intelligent gorilla with telepathic powers. He gained his powers from being experimented on by General Eiling under Eobard Thawne's watch but with Caitlin Snow's support. Grodd is sent to Gorilla City on Earth-2 by the Flash and Harry Wells, where he plans an attack to Central City with a gorilla army. However, he is defeated by the Flash, Kid Flash, Jesse Quick and Solovar, and imprisoned at A.R.G.U.S. Grodd later returns and mind-controls Cisco Ramon and Killer Frost into stealing Tanya Lamden's telepathy crown in a plot to take control of Central City's minds. With help from the Flash and XS, King Shark defeats Grodd, who is placed in a medically induced coma in a special cell that would adapt to his powers. While voicing his knowledge of the Crisis, Grodd states that he found out that Gorilla City is now on Earth-Prime and wants to return to it, forcing him to work with Barry. Caitlin arranges for Grodd to be released on probation with a tracking chip in him so that Team Flash will know where to find him if he returns to villainy. However, Grodd found that his tribe of gorillas lost sentience following the Crisis and are scattered throughout Africa. The Red Death approached him with the offer to boost psychic control over the Red Death's sentinels in exchange for finding his tribe. Following the Red Death's defeat, S.T.A.R. Labs agrees to help Grodd find his tribe.

=== Introduced in season two ===
==== Jesse Wells / Jesse Quick ====
Jesse Chambers Wells / Jesse Quick (portrayed by Violett Beane; seasons 2–4) is the daughter of Harry Wells from Earth-2. Like her father, Jesse is a science prodigy with five majors in college, including biochemistry. Zoom holds Jesse captive to extort Harry's cooperation until she is rescued by her father, Barry, Cisco, and Earth-2's Barry and Iris. Jesse and Harry seeks refuge on Earth-1 and she leaves for Opal City after discovering the lengths Harry will take to keep her safe. Jesse returns after her father is kidnapped and works with Team Flash. Jesse and Wally are affected by dark matter when Harry attempts to restore Barry's speed; Barry later brings her out of her coma. Following Zoom's defeat, Jesse returns to Earth-2 with her father. Months later Jesse exhibits speedster abilities and aspires to help people, though her father disapproves. After she helps Barry twice, Harry is more encouraging and has Cisco make her a speedster suit. Jesse and Harry return to Earth-2, where Jesse becomes Earth-2's speedster superhero under the name Jesse Quick. Jesse and Wally admit their feelings, and have a long-distance relationship until she breaks up with Wally.

==== Hunter Zolomon / Zoom ====
Hunter Zolomon / Zoom (portrayed by Teddy Sears, initially portrayed by Ryan Handley, voiced by Tony Todd; seasons 2–3, 5 and 9) is a speedster from Earth-2 who is obsessed with being the only speedster in the multiverse and the main antagonist of season two. Executive producer Andrew Kreisberg said, in season one "with the Reverse-Flash, we just modulated Tom Cavanagh's voice, and this year we wanted to do something a little bit different [for Zoom]. Part of the mystery of the season is who or what is underneath the Zoom outfit, and so we wanted to do something like James Earl Jones as Darth Vader — this iconic voice coming out of this mask." Hunter was a traumatized child (portrayed by Octavian Kaul) that witnessed his mother's murder at his father's hands, which triggered his bloodlust as a serial killer before he gained his speedster abilities from the particle-accelerator explosion on Earth-2. Dissatisfied, he sought to increase his speed with the Velocity serums which he soon discovered carried a fatal illness. He also traveled the multiverse and imprisoned Jay Garrick with a speed-dampening mask after he is unsuccessful in stealing Jay's speed to cure himself. Inspired to be both hero and villain, he uses Jay's name as the fraudulent Flash of Earth-2 to instill false hope, which he then takes away as Zoom. Discovering Earth-1, he plots to increase Barry's speed, sending various metahumans from Earth-2 to fight the Flash of Earth-1 while also infiltrating the team as Caitlin Snow's love interest. Zoom extorts Harry Wells into physically stealing Barry's speed by kidnapping Jesse Wells. After succeeding in stealing Barry's speed, Zoom brings his army of Earth-2 metahumans to conquer Earth-1 and construct a device capable of destroying the other Earths in the multiverse, to ensure he remains the only speedster. Hunter seeks to corrupt Caitlin's mind into being like Earth-2 Killer Frost and then Barry's by killing Henry in the same spot the Reverse-Flash killed Nora, convinced that they are similar because of their childhood traumas. However, Barry ultimately bests Zoom in their final fight before two Time Wraiths arrive to punish him for his crimes and transform him into the Black Flash.

- Sears also briefly portrays the Earth-1 version of the character, a non-metahuman individual.

==== Jay Garrick / Flash ====
Jay Garrick (portrayed by John Wesley Shipp; seasons 2–4 and 6–9) is the Earth-3 version of Henry Allen. Hunter Zolomon held him captive in a failed attempt to harness his speed before being inspired to take up his name and persona to falsely operate as the Flash of Earth-2. Zoom keeps him from escaping by forcing Jay to wear a mask that suppressed his speed and prevented him from talking. After Zoom's defeat, Jay is rescued by Barry and returns to Earth-3. Jay adopts Hunter's Flash helmet as a symbol of hope, taking satisfaction in taking something from Zoom as the villainous speedster had done to him. After learning that Henry is his Earth-1 doppelgänger and Barry is Henry's son, Jay watches over Barry as a sympathetic yet stern mentor to which a friendship develops. After Barry undoes Flashpoint and trying to fix the mistakes left in its wake, he explains to Barry that time travel can have adverse consequences and that Barry must live with these mistakes. Jay also helps Barry come to terms with Henry's death and in battling Savitar. The two Flashes do initially banish Savitar to the Speed Force, but Savitar manages to escape and Jay takes Savitar's place. After being freed, Jay joins Team Flash in the final battle to defeat Savitar. Jay later returns to help Barry use Flashtime, and reveals that he plans to retire and is training a protégée as his successor as the Flash. Afterwards, Jay has retired and settled down with Joan. Sometime after the Crisis, Jay is now living on Earth-Prime in Keystone City and regains his speed powers with the help of Joan. Before he can join the fight against Godspeed's drones in Central City, he ends up taken captive to draw Impulse out. It is revealed that the future of 2040 has him as the mentor of Bart Allen, and he gets killed by Godspeed. Barry and XS were able to rescue Jay and Bart with help from Mecha-Vibe.

- Regarding the difference in his portrayal of Garrick over Allen, Shipp "figured Jay is my version of Barry" from the 1990 series, adding, "I went back and I watched a couple of episodes of the 1990–91 version to kind of remind myself what I did. [Jay] is much more reminiscent of my Barry Allen from 25 years ago than my Henry Allen. I went back and I was amazed how much attitude my Barry Allen had in some situations. I went back and I picked up that thread and I brought it forward 25 years, and tried to weave it in."

==== Patty Spivot ====
Patty Spivot (portrayed by Shantel VanSanten; season 2) is Joe West's new protégée and partner, a member of the metahuman task force at CCPD along with Cisco Ramon, and a love interest of Barry Allen. Her father was murdered by Mark Mardon during a bank robbery, leaving Patty determined to stop metahuman criminals. She believes that having superhuman power brings out the best or the worst in people, and acknowledges the Flash's heroism. Her hatred for Mark stems from survivor's guilt; when she was a teenager, she was supposed to make the deposit at the bank where her father died. When Patty gets her chance at revenge on Mark, the Flash persuades her to choose justice over vengeance. She leaves Central City to pursue her studies in the Forensic Science program at Midway City University. She also deduces Barry's secret identity and confronts Barry to confirm his identity to her and ask her to give up her dream and stay with him, but Barry admits nothing, not wanting to stop Patty from pursuing said dream. Patty later tricks Barry into revealing his Flash persona to her as she departs Central City, making him confront her in a train, after a faux attack, where they say goodbye seemingly ending their relationship on good terms.

- The Earth-2 version of the character is stated to be a scientist in the Criminal and Forensic Science Division in the Central City Police Department.

==== Francine West ====
Francine West (portrayed by Vanessa A. Williams; seasons 2–3 and 9) is Iris West's and Wally West's mother and Joe West's estranged wife. Francine abandoned her family years prior to Joe taking Barry Allen in, out of guilt of endangering Iris through her drug abuse. After settling in Keystone City and following Wally's birth, Francine becomes sober from her addiction and a good mother to her son. After being diagnosed with MacGregor's syndrome (a terminal illness related to substance abuse), she tries to reconcile with her family and to entrust Wally to them before she dies. Joe and Iris forgive Francine on her deathbed and accept Wally as part of the family.

==== Speed Force ====
The Speed Force (portrayed primarily by Michelle Harrison and occasionally by other actors; seasons 2–3 and 6–9) is an interdimensional cosmic force of nature behind speedsters' abilities. The Speed Force would help Barry and other speedsters.

=== Introduced in season three ===
==== Kara Zor-El / Kara Danvers / Supergirl ====
Kara Zor-El / Kara Danvers / Supergirl (portrayed by Melissa Benoist; seasons 3–6) is Barry Allen's friend and ally from Earth-38 who is an extraterrestrial superhero from the doomed planet Krypton. She first met after Barry accidentally breached the dimensional barrier separating their universes when testing a tachyon device (see "Worlds Finest"). Supergirl proves herself as a trusted ally after she travels to Earth-1 to help its heroes resist an alien invasion, and Oliver Queen and Barry entrusted her with a device that enables her to travel and communicate between her universe and theirs. She and her allies occasionally join Barry and other Earth-1 heroes on missions. Benoist reprises the role from Supergirl.

- Benoist also portrays Overgirl, the Earth-X version of the character.

==== Julian Albert / Alchemy ====
Julian Albert Desmond / Alchemy (portrayed by Tom Felton, voiced by Tobin Bell; season 3) is a scientist and fellow CSI at the CCPD who came from a prosperous old English family. The character was originally known as Julian Dorn. He works with Barry Allen though the two did not initially get along. As Alchemy, he is an acolyte of Savitar who unlocks the potential in metahumans from the Flashpoint timeline in preparation for a future event. Julian is not aware of this, and that he only assumes the Alchemy guise while being unconsciously possessed by Savitar. To fix what he made as Alchemy, Julian decides to join the team to help against Savitar and other metahumans. Julian and Caitlin Snow develop a romantic relationship. After Savitar's defeat, Julian returned to the United Kingdom.

==== Cynthia / Gypsy ====
Cynthia / Gypsy (portrayed by Jessica Camacho; seasons 3–6) is a bounty hunter from Earth-19 with similar powers to Vibe.

==== Tracy Brand ====
Tracy Brand (portrayed by Anne Dudek; season 3) is an eccentric doctoral student who studies speedsters with "a smorgasbord of quirky idiosyncrasies". She is targeted by Savitar due to her future self aiding Savitar's defeat in 2021. Tracy later allies with Team Flash to fulfill her destiny sooner against Savitar as well as being a love interest of H.R. Wells in the process. She later witnesses H.R. being killed by Savitar and hates the rogue time-remnant.

==== Carla Tannhauser ====
Dr. Carla Tannhauser (portrayed by Susan Walters; seasons 3, 5–6 and 8) is Caitlin's estranged mother, Thomas Snow's wife, a biomedical engineer, and CEO of a major research company.

=== Introduced in season four ===
==== Marlize DeVoe ====
Marlize DeVoe (portrayed by Kim Engelbrecht; season 4) is a highly intelligent engineer, and the wife of Clifford DeVoe. She initially worked on designs and devices for the Thinker out of loyalty and would join her husband in harassing and mocking Team Flash every time the two score a victory. But as Clifford's original personality begins to be replaced by one of increasing cruelty and arrogance, Marlize comes to realize that the husband she loved was gone and helps Team Flash defeat DeVoe in the final battle.

==== Amunet Black ====
Leslie Jocoy / Amunet Black (portrayed by Katee Sackhoff; seasons 4 and 6) is a metahuman crime lord who operates an underground black market for meta supervillains, and Goldface's ex. Originally an air hostess, she has the power to manipulate metal, but prefers using special metal shards when in combat. Amunet convinced Caitlin Snow to work with her, promising a cure. Caitlin later leaves her employ, but Amunet repeatedly tries to coerce Caitlin back to her side. Team Flash later forms a truce with Amunet when her henchman Norvok plots to sell her metal shards. During this time, she theorizes that Caitlin could not access Killer Frost due to a placebo effect. After making a device for Team Flash to use against DeVoe's Enlightenment device, Amunet escapes in a metallic tornado. While largely unaffected by the Crisis, Amunet returns when she engages Goldface in a turf war as both were after the Rappaccini's Daughter flower. The Flash stops them by releasing pollen from said flower, causing the two crime lords to be spontaneous with each other. Amunet later sent Goldface and his men to raid the Central City Police Department to steal the meta-bullets, and later gets incarcerated as a result while Goldface got a reduced sentence.

==== Matthew Norvock ====
Matthew Norvock (portrayed by Mark Sweatman; seasons 4–7) is a metahuman henchman of Amunet Black, whose prosthetic right eye hides a tentacle-like appendage that he uses as a weapon. He tried to sell some of Amunet's metal to other crime lords in an act of betrayal, but his former boss defeats him after the snake-like creature is cut off and he is arrested by Joe West. Later, Norvock is one of the metahumans Cicada is hunting and even helps Killer Frost track down Bloodwork. Norvock is an observer during Frost's trial, thanking the latter for showing the public that criminals can be redeemed, since Frost willingly is going to prison to pay for previous crimes.

==== Sharon Finkel ====
Sharon Finkel (portrayed by Donna Pescow; season 4) is a therapist who Barry Allen and Iris West visit, as do Team Flash's other members.

==== Officer Jones ====
Officer "Jonesy" Jones (portrayed by Klarc Wilson; seasons 4–5) works for the Central City Police Department. After being mind controlled by Spencer Young, he develops a hatred of meta humans. He aids Cicada by giving him a list of metas to kill and gives him the location where the metas on the list are taken to police protection. After Cecile and Singh discover his involvement with Cicada (thanks to Cecile's telepathic abilities), he is fired and arrested by CCPD.

=== Introduced in season five ===
==== Vanessa Ambres ====
Dr. Vanessa Ambres (portrayed by Lossen Chambers; season 5) is an ER doctor at Central City Hospital who shares Cicada's anti-metahuman sentiment. Having treated many victims of metahuman attacks and losing her fiancé Darius during Zoom's rampage, she watches over Grace Gibbons and reluctantly protects Orlin Dwyer. Ambres even steals drugs from the ER to help the present Cicada. After helping Team Flash cure Orlin, Dr. Ambres is killed by the future Cicada.

==== Thomas Snow / Icicle ====
Dr. Thomas Snow / Icicle (portrayed by Kyle Secor; season 5) is Caitlin Snow's father and Carla Tannhauser's husband. Though he was believed to have died of ALS, Thomas is found in an arctic lab by Caitlin, Barry and Cisco after Ralph discover that Snow's death certificate was faked. They later learn that in his attempt to cure his ALS, he became a cryogenic metahuman with an evil personality like Caitlin. When most of Team Flash start to freeze, Caitlin proves to be immune just before Killer Frost reemerges. Father and daughter engage in an ice battle. After Thomas' personality briefly surfaces, Icicle knocks Killer Frost back and gets away. Icicle later returns with a plan to eliminate Caitlin and Carla's human sides. He is about to kill Caitlin, when Thomas suddenly finds the strength to return to his human form. When Caitlin is attacked by Cicada, Thomas sacrifices himself to save his daughter's life.

==== Grace Gibbons / Cicada II ====
Grace Gibbons (portrayed by Islie Hirvonen as a pre-teen, Sarah Carter as an adult; season 5) is the orphaned niece of Orlin Dwyer who lost her parents in a metahuman incident. She was placed in a coma after being caught in the Enlightenment Satellite's falling debris, which also affected her uncle. Later, when Nora West-Allen (XS) enters Grace's mind, it is revealed that she is consciously aware of what's happening despite her comatose state because a shard from the satellite affected her brain; turning her into a metahuman and forming a mental barrier to prevent further invasions. Trapped in her painful memories and negative emotions, Grace now shares her uncle's hatred of all metahumans despite being one and is implied to be even more powerful than him. Now she declares war against the Flash and XS, vowing to make them pay by any means necessary. When Orlin is cured of his metahuman abilities, an adult Grace from the future attacks S.T.A.R. Labs, kills Dr. Ambres, and abducts him. The adult Grace comes from a future where metahumans thrive, so she has taken up the mantle of Cicada upon awaking from her coma to complete her uncle's mission of killing them all, serving as one of the two main antagonists of season five. She first targets Vickie Bolen, a metahuman who accidentally caused her parents' death. During her fight with the Flash, Grace is confronted by her uncle, who tries to reason with her, which leads to her killing him before fleeing. As Orlin dies in Flash's arms, he tells him to save Grace. Grace later kidnaps her younger self from the hospital. She then crashes the battle between Team Flash and Icicle, stealing the cryo-atomizer Icicle had stolen earlier. She then steals prototype versions of S.T.A.R. Labs' metahuman cure, which she can weaponize into a lethal version with the cryo-atomizer. Nora re-enters Grace's mind and with a version of Orlin successfully convinces her to abandon her anti-metahuman feelings. Meanwhile, the adult Grace ceases to exist after the Flash destroys her dagger with a Mirror Gun. Present day Grace is mentioned to have been placed in a foster home.

==== Kamilla Hwang ====
Kamilla Hwang (portrayed by Victoria Park; seasons 5–7) is a bartender, aspiring photographer and Cisco Ramon's girlfriend. She gets a job as a photographer for the Central City Citizen under Iris West-Allen and provides occasional assistance at S.T.A.R. Labs. After Cisco took a leave of absence from Team Flash, Kamilla took a more active role by filling in for him in certain areas until he returned. While working late however, she discovered evidence involving Eva McCulloch's secret mirror clone conspiracy. Before she could alert the rest of Team Flash, she gets shot her with McCulloch Technologies' mirror gun while Eva created a mirror clone of her so their enemies wouldn't get suspicious. Her mirror clone sacrifices herself to briefly open Bloodwork's cell. Iris manages to find Kamilla within the Mirrorverse. Kamilla is eventually released from the Mirrorverse following Mirror Monarch's defeat. She and Cisco later leave Central City when she got a job offer.

==== Jenna West ====
Jenna West is the daughter of Joe West and Cecile Horton, the younger half sister of Iris West-Allen and Wally West, and the maternal half sister of Joanie.

==== August Heart / Godspeed ====
August Heart / Godspeed (portrayed by Kindall Charters in season five, Karan Oberoi in season seven, voiced by BD Wong; seasons 5-7, 9) - An ambitious scientist who becomes a speedster in 2049 after utilizing tachyons in replicating the Velocity drug. As a Mercury Labs intern, he sought to create a new version of the drug that would make his powers permanent before he was thwarted by Nora West-Allen and incarcerated. However, Heart mysteriously turned up in 2019 and sent out a series of imposter drones to attack Central City and steal Barry's speed. Team Flash initially catch his proxies yet were unable to locate Heart himself, but learned that he had aligned himself with a group who wants infinite velocity. The drones of Godspeed are fighting among each other in a civil war drones to see who will get to Heart first or kill him. Cecile and Diggle were able to find Heart who has amnesia. After his memory was restored upon Barry giving him organic speed, Godspeed withdrew his clones and fought Barry before he's defeated by the Reverse-Flash, yet survived and was remanded to Iron Heights with his memory of Barry's identity being removed.

- The various drones of Godspeed were mostly only able to speak "modem". This first series of Godspeed drones, including a fourth one (portrayed by Ryan Handley) and fifth one who drained the other drones, were defeated by Barry. The second series of Godspeed drones fight among each other to see who will get to Heart first, including a drone (voiced by Rick D. Wasserman) who gets caught with John Diggle's Entropy Trap before escaping and later partook in targeting Bart Allen which involved capturing Jay Garrick.

==== Trevor Shinick ====
Trevor Shinick (portrayed by Everick Golding; season 5) is a prison guard at Iron Heights Prison in 2049. He is in charge of Eobard Thawne's cell in the meta-human wing.

==== Negative Speed Force ====
The Negative Speed Force (portrayed by various actors; seasons 5 and 8–9) is an interdimensional cosmic force of nature and the opposite of the regular Speed Force. It was initially believed to be created by Eobard Thawne as an alternate power source. It became obsessed with getting revenge on Barry Allen, especially after Thawne's death. Willing to upset the balance of the positive and negative forces, It possessed several individuals that Barry knew and was close with in an attempt to kill him and his family.

=== Introduced in season six ===
==== Ramsey Rosso / Bloodwork ====
Ramsey Rosso (portrayed by Sendhil Ramamurthy; seasons 6 and 9) is a physician with a genius intellect, the world's leading expert on hematological oncology and a former colleague of Caitlin Snow who has a desire to defy the laws of nature and the main antagonist of season six's first half. After his mother dies of HLH, Rosso developed a cure for the disorder using dark matter in spite of Caitlin's warnings. Though he ran numerous simulations that showed otherwise, he was turned into a metahuman after testing the cure on himself as he was also dying of HLH. In his pursuit to cure himself, he discovered he could use his abilities to transform people into zombie-like monsters by draining their blood. With Barry under his control, Ramsey attempted to convert all of Central City into his "Blood Brothers and Sisters", only to be foiled by Team Flash. Ramsey transforms into a blood monster to fight the Flash in retaliation, but he is trapped in a special machine previously used to contain Chester Runk's black hole-based powers before being remanded him to A.R.G.U.S. custody. A few months later, Eva McCulloch's mirror clones break Ramsey out, but he only agreed to the former; choosing to stay imprisoned and "play the long game". Shortly thereafter, Ramsey uses Wally West to infect the multiverse. However, Ramsey is confronted by Barry, Oliver Queen, and John Diggle, who help save Wally and stop Ramsey's plans. Ramsey loses all of his powers while also being cured of his HLH, but is sentenced to life imprisonment to his crimes.

==== Daisy Korber ====
Daisy Korber (portrayed by Stephanie Izsak; seasons 6–9) is a member of the Central City Police Department.

==== Esperanza Garcia / Ultraviolet ====
Esperanza Garcia / Ultraviolet (portrayed by Alexa Barajas, voiced by Erika Soto in season 7; seasons 6–8) is a metahuman assassin and cousin of Allegra Garcia who also has abilities based on the electromagnetic spectrum. She was believed to have been killed during the original particle accelerator explosion, but was taken in, revived and trained to be an assassin by Black Hole. In addition, Ultraviolet's vocal cords were removed by Dr. Olsen and she was given a mask to restore her capability of speech. After attacking CCPD to kill Allegra, Ultraviolet is defeated by the Flash and sent to Iron Heights. Ultraviolet later goes after Olsen to exact her revenge which leads to her running into Allegra and Dearbon. When catching up to Olsen, Ultraviolet is promised to be fully healed if she takes out Allegra. Ultraviolet and Olsen end up being defeated by Allegra. Ultraviolet begins tracking down Black Hole's remnants, which she succeeds in, only to be killed in battle.

==== Sue Dearbon ====
Sue Dearbon (portrayed by Natalie Dreyfuss; seasons 6–8) is a missing person that Ralph Dibny had been attempting to find. She is a thief with connections to Black Hole. When Ralph first found her, Sue manipulated Ralph into helping her get a diamond from a low level criminal before making off with it. At her hideout, Sue discovered information on Black Hole embedded in the diamond. She later robbed several banks used by the organization with one of them being under the alias of "January Galore" (portrayed by Rebecca Roberts), only to encounter Ralph and Cisco. She gave them the diamond and explained Black Hole was extorting her parents before departing once more. During a third encounter, Ralph discovers Sue joined Black Hole to kill its leader Joseph Carver. Despite some difficulty, he was able to talk her out of it. After Eva McCulloch killed Carver, Sue believed she could return to her family until she learned Eva framed her for the murder, resulting in Sue and Ralph going off the grid. She later returned where she poses as a police officer to warn Joe about Mirror Monarch's mirror clone plot and Ralph finding the evidence to clear her name. Following Mirror Monarch giving up, Sue and Ralph left to find other organizations like Black Hole and take them out. Sue later returned to help Chester and Allegra deal with Cecile controlled by Psycho-Pirate's mask. While breaking in the museum Sue performs a lasers-dodging dance and a front handspring, the possessed Cecile uses her powers on Sue to tranquilize herself before recovered at med bay. Sue arrives at CC Jitters to stop Ultraviolet from attacking Allegra then they capture her outside the hospital, at the Team Flash base Sue and Ultraviolet start to fight as Sue does a cartwheel when Chester gets hit by Ultraviolet's blast before she teleports to find Olsen, Sue and Allegra have an argument about what happened, the team locates Ultraviolet at the warehouse. Sue defeats Dr. Olsen's men with her cartwheel somersault. Sue visits Iris mentioning that Black Hole has been defeated and her parents are incarcerated enabling Sue to take over their business. She accompanies Iris to Coast City to investigate the Coast City Phantom.

=== Introduced in season seven ===
==== Kristen Kramer ====
Kristen Kramer (portrayed by Carmen Moore; seasons 7–9) is a woman of Wet'suwet'en descent who serves as a liaison from the Governor's Municipal Logistics Commission. The platoon she was part of was led into an ambush by an unidentified metahuman that they trusted, which led to her issues with metahumans that claim that they can do good. Kramer is later revealed to be a metahuman who can copy the ability of any meta in close proximity for a short period of time.

==== Alexa Rivera / Fuerza ====
Alexa Rivera / Fuerza (portrayed by Sara Garcia; seasons 7–8) is a conduit for the Strength Force. Originally a social aid health worker who is working hard to overcome a dark past as she helps the underprivileged in Central City, she assumes the form of a muscular woman who kills Abra Kabadra. After being apparently killed by the Speed Force, Barry and Iris were able to revive her. With the same device that Caitlin used to talk to Frost when they shared the same body, Alexa speaks to Fuerza who helps the Flash subdue Psych and persuade to come to S.T.A.R. Labs together but the Speed Force later zaps Alexa, Iris and Psych. She, Deon and Psych later helped the Flash convince the Speed Force that they're on the same side. Afterwards, Alexa moves in with the Speed Force. Cecile later helps Psych rescue Fuerza. She and the other positive Force avatars empower the Flash to defeat the Reverse-Flash. Afterwards, the Strength Force is fixed enough to return everything that was displaced by the Negative Still Force back to its respective locations.

==== Deon Owens ====
Deon Owens (portrayed by Christian Magby; seasons 7–8) is a conduit for the Still Force. Originally a teenage football star who got a salesman job following a career-ending move, he uses his time abilities to relive his past before being convinced to stop by Chester and Cisco. Deon later encountered Barry and aged the component for the vest made to keep the Still Force from leaving his body. After Barry's time-travel trip is aborted to keep the Strength Force, the Sage Force, and the Still Force from being created, Deon is confronted by the Speed Force who sways him into an alliance. Deon was able to freeze Barry in place so that the Speed Force can zap Iris, Alexa and Bashir. He, Fuerza and Psych later helped the Flash to help the Speed Force realize that they're all on the same side. Afterwards, Deon moves in with the Speed Force. Deon also preserves Iris in a time loop during the Godspeed War. Deon later notes Iris's suspicion that something is wrong and helps send Barry to 2031 to find out about Eobard Thawne's Reverse-Flashpoint timeline. Deon later learns Iris's time fluxes causes time to fracture nearby. As Iris's time sickness got worse, Deon got sick as well. Afterwards, he apparently double-crosses Barry to be trapped in an area of time while making off with the device needed to find Iris. In reality, Deon lost access to his body and is now possessed by the Negative Still Force. He used some of his remaining strength to send XS to save Barry. Deon later approaches Thawne and states that it is time to "fulfill his destiny". Their conversation ended with Deon killing Thawne by aging to death and sacrifices Iris so that Thawne can be revived in the time remnant Thawne's body. Cecile helps Psych rescue the real Deon. He and the other positive Force avatars empower the Flash so that he can defeat the Reverse-Flash. Afterwards, the Still Force is fixed, returning everything that was displaced by the Negative Still Force to their original locations.

==== Bashir Malik / Psych ====
Bashir Malik / Psych (portrayed by Ennis Esmer; seasons 7–8) is a conduit for the Sage Force. Originally a man previously abandoned by his biological and adoptive parents, his psychic abilities make people experience their worst fears. These include Cecile's fear of someone in a straitjacket, Barry's fear of his enemies, in the form of Eobard Thawne and Savitar, defeating him as well as his failure to keep everyone alive, Vibe seeing Kamilla in danger, and Killer Frost being handed over to the police by Caitlin Snow. With help from Cecile, Flash managed to defeat Psych, who faded away. The Speed Force later suspects that Psych and Fuerza are beings just like her. This is later confirmed when Cisco later considered him a conduit for the Sage Force. Iris, Allegra, and Kamilla later encountered Psych in the Allen family's old home where he subjected them to their worst fears. They escaped from Psych during Barry's trip to the past. Flash and Iris later learned about his past when he started going after the League of Lions members from his old high school that are now millionaires and placing them in catatonic conditions. When it came to the latest person, Flash was able to talk him down with Fuerza's help and he came along with them quietly while undoing the effects of the League of Lions members. When the Speed Force raided S.T.A.R. Labs with Deon, Psych, Iris, and Alexa were zapped by the Speed Force, something revealed to have been an illusion used to trick the Speed Force. He, Fuerza, and Psych later helped Flash to snap the Speed Force back to her senses. Afterwards, Psych moves in with the Speed Force. Later, Cecile's abilities rescues Psych. He and the other positive Force avatars empower the Flash to defeat the Reverse-Flash. Afterwards, the Sage Force is fixed, returning everything that was displaced by the Negative Still Force to their original locations.

==== Bart West-Allen / Impulse ====
Bart West-Allen / Impulse (portrayed by Jordan Fisher; seasons 7–8) is the future son of Barry Allen and Iris West and younger brother of Nora West-Allen. He showed up with Nora in the present where he meets Barry. During his time, he lost his uncle Jay Garrick to Godspeed where Bart considered Godspeed to be his version of Eobard Thawne. When the present day Jay was captured by the Godspeed Drones, Bart tried to rescue him only for the attacks of the Godspeed Drones to place him in a coma with his speed-healing helping him out. Nora and Bart later time-travel to 2013 where they investigate why Joan was erased. They managed to undo Joan's erasing. When Iris appeared in 2049, Nora was unable to return her to her own time due to the Negative Still Force. After Joan Williams confirms that there are negative tachyons in Iris, Nora heads to Flash's time to warn him of it. Bart and Nora later help Flash in fighting Eobard Thawne.

=== Introduced in season eight ===
==== Despero ====
Despero (portrayed by Tony Curran; season 8) is an alien from a point in the future where Flash supposedly brought armageddon to Earth. His abilities come from the Fires of Py'tar, and he also wears a special belt that allows him to travel through time and assume a human form. Despero was once part of a rebellion against a tyrant that he was unable to bring himself to kill, resulting in Despero being banished from Earth. He traveled to the present to dispose of Flash, where he also fought Atom.

==== Taylor Downs ====
Taylor Downs (portrayed by Rachel Drance; season 8–9) is a reporter for the Central City Citizen Media who starts to develop a rivalry with Allegra. This lasted until Allegra revealed her abilities during the attack from Doctor Light and Sunshine.

==== Deathstorm ====
Deathstorm (portrayed by Robbie Amell; season 8) is a negative cold fusion energy that was created from Ronnie Raymond's sacrifice. After impersonating Ultraviolet to fight Allegra, Deathstorm dodges Flash and took Caitlin to Ripley's Wild World where he killed some of the people there to feed off the grief. As he starts to use his powers on her, Deathstorm flees upon declaring that Caitlin is not ready, impersonating Eddie Thawne and Nora Allen to get to Iris and Barry respectively. While feeding off of Team Flash's grief, Deathstorm is confronted by Frost as Hellfrost, saving Caitlin and consuming Deathstorm.

==== Tinya Wazzo / Phantom Girl ====
Tinya Wazzo (portrayed by Mika Abdalla; season 8) is a girl with the ability to become intangible who has been operating as the Coast City Phantom. Iris and Sue take her along to help her in finding her birth mother Renee, who abandoned her. When they did find Renee, Iris' time sickness caused Renee to disappear into the Still Force leaving Tinya devastated. She later makes Iris disappear and advises Sue not to go after her again. Barry later visits Tinya in Coast City hoping to get her to help find Iris. She turns him down as she still blames Iris for what happened to Renee and takes her leave. After Thawne was defeated, Flash and Iris reunite Tinya with Renee after everything that was trapped in the Still Force was returned to their respective locations.

==== Meena Dhawan / Fast Track ====
Meena Dhawan (portrayed by Kausar Mohammed; season 8) is the CEO of Fast Track Labs. She became a speedster by using the Biometric Lightning Oscillation Chamber (BLOC), which she invented alongside the amnesiac time remnant of Eobard Thawne, with whom she was romantically involved. Barry gives her the moniker "Fast Track" and mentors her. She briefly becomes corrupted by the Negative Speed Force and is distraught when the Negative Forces kill her lover by resurrecting the original Thawne in his body. After his defeat, the BLOC is depowered and Meena loses her speed. She is last seen preparing to depart; Iris gave her Eobard's yellow tie, noting that though she didn't meet this version, he was a "special person", to which Meena agreed.

==== Negative Still Force ====
The Negative Still Force (portrayed by various actors) is an interdimensional cosmic force of nature as the opposite of the regular Still Force. It was initially believed to be simply an extra-dimensional source of energy before eventually showcasing its own personality. The Negative Still Force gets Iris sick with an illness where time fluxes that causes time to fracture to get the positive Forces sick. The Negative Still Force impersonated Deon Owen while constantly feeding on energy before obtaining the forms of Fuerza and Psych. After killing Thawne by aging to death, the Negative Still Force sacrifices Iris to use Eobard's time remnant to revive the original version. The Negative Forces three forms then empower Thawne as an enhanced avatar.

=== Introduced in season nine ===
==== Ryan Wilder / Red Death ====
Ryan Wilder / Red Death (portrayed by Javicia Leslie; season 9) is the Earth-4125 counterpart of Ryan Wilder. She was adopted by the Wayne family, and was left as Gotham City's sole protector when they were killed by Joe Chill. She became friends with her Earth's Iris, who was accidentally killed during a fight with her Earth's Barry. She then created a suit with an Artificial Speed Force and became Red Death, but was rejected from the Speed Force and landed on Earth-Prime in a vibrational phase. Unaware of the Spectre's new multiverse, she believed it was an alternate timeline.

She recruited the Rogues to help solidify her and resolved to build a Cosmic Treadmill so she could return home, going so far as to threaten Iris's life to ensure Flash's compliance. She was defeated by Flash, Gorilla Grodd, and Batwoman and remanded to A.R.G.U.S. custody so Batwoman's identity would be kept secret. Spectre later revealed that she was from Earth-4125, not another timeline.

==== Owen Mercer / Captain Boomerang ====
Owen Mercer (portrayed by Richard Harmon; season 9) is a member of the new Rogues and works for Red Death. He is the second villain with this title and uses special Wayne Enterprises boomerangs acquired by Red Death, and can also teleport.

==== Andrea Wozzeck / Fiddler ====
Andrea Wozzeck / Fiddler (portrayed by Magda Apanowicz; season 9) is a member of the new Rogues and works for Red Death. She is the second villain with this title, and using a special Wayne Enterprises fiddle, can manipulate sound and entrap people in vibrational phases. She is a fan of Nine Inch Nails.

== Guest stars ==
The following is a supplementary list of guest stars, some recurring, who appear in lesser roles. The characters are listed in order of appearance by the season in which they first appeared.

=== Introduced in season one ===
- Clyde Mardon (portrayed by Chad Rook) – A bank robber and murderer who was turned into a metahuman with the ability to control the weather of his surroundings. He is shot and killed by Joe West in the pilot episode.
- Simon Stagg (portrayed by William Sadler) – An industrialist and philanthropist who is fascinated with the Flash (Barry Allen) to the point of exploitation. He is killed by Eobard Thawne.
- Java (portrayed by Michasha Armstrong) – The head of security for Stagg Enterprises. Danton Black bribes him to gain access to Simon Stagg's house, but Java refused. In retaliation, Danton used his powers to kill him.
- Danton Black / Multiplex (portrayed by Michael Christopher Smith) – A scientist-turned-metahuman with the ability to duplicate himself. He is killed after falling out a window trying to attack the Flash.
- Kyle Nimbus / Mist (portrayed by Anthony Carrigan) – A metahuman who can turn himself into a poisonous mist and is an enemy of Joe West.
- Bette Sans Souci / Plastique (portrayed by Kelly Frye) – A former war veteran and metahuman with the ability to explode anything she touches. After Souci is shot and killed by Wade Eiling, Barry throws her body into the ocean, where she detonates safely.
- Tony Woodward / Girder (portrayed by Greg Finley) – A metahuman with the ability to turn his skin into steel. He bullied Barry Allen and Iris West when they were children. In season one, he kidnaps Iris to make himself famous only to be defeated by the Flash and remanded to S.T.A.R. Labs. He is later killed by Farooq during Barry's temporary power loss.
- Farooq Gibran / Blackout (portrayed by Michael Reventar) – A metahuman with the power to harness electricity. Farooq blamed Eobard Thawne for his friends' deaths after he accidentally killed them with his uncontrollable powers. He overloaded himself while trying to absorb the Flash's powers and died, with his body held in S.T.A.R. Labs.
- William Tockman / Clock King (portrayed by Robert Knepper) – A master criminal. In season one of The Flash, Tockman took several civilians at CCPD hostage. Knepper reprises the role from Arrow.
- Roy Bivolo / Prism / Rainbow Raider (portrayed by Paul Anthony) – A metahuman with the ability to induce uncontrollable rage in others. Bivolo infects and sends Barry Allen on a rage fit throughout the city which is only calmed by the Arrow, his team and S.T.A.R. Labs. After they defeat Bivolo, he was held in the particle accelerator prison before being set free by Leonard Snart. In season seven, it was mentioned by Kristen Kramer that Rainbow Raider has gone missing. In season nine, Rainbow Raider was recruited by Red Death.
- Quentin Lance (portrayed by Paul Blackthorne) – A police captain in the Starling City Police Department. He helps Joe West and Cisco Ramon discover Earth-1 Harrison Wells's corpse, and Quentin and Joe become friends in the process due to their similarities as police detectives and fathers. Blackthorne stars as the character on Arrow.
  - The Earth-2 version of the character (who is deceased) is mentioned by Black Siren in Arrow.
  - Blackthorne also played the Earth-X version of the character in the "Crisis on Earth-X" crossover, a SS Sturmbannführer under Dark Arrow.
- Laurel Lance / Black Canary (portrayed by Katie Cassidy) – A Starling City assistant district attorney and vigilante. Cisco Ramon provides Laurel with an ultrasonic collar using components from both Sara Lance (Canary) and Hartley Rathaway's sonic weapons, improving Laurel's tactics with sonic weaponry. Cassidy stars as the character on Arrow.
  - Cassidy also portrays the Earth-2 version of the character named Black Siren, a villainous metahuman and one of Zoom's lieutenants.
  - Cassidy also portrays the Earth-X version of the character named Siren-X, the unrequited lover of Dark Arrow and a remnant of the Earth-X regime who comes to Earth-1 to avenge Dark Arrow. She kidnaps Fallout from an A.R.G.U.S. transport to cause him to explode. With Leo Snart's help, the Flash defeats Siren-X and prevents her victim's explosion.
- Lyla Michaels (portrayed by Audrey Marie Anderson) – An A.R.G.U.S. agent and John Diggle's wife. In season two, she travels to Central City to help Barry Allen track down King Shark after he escaped from A.R.G.U.S. custody. In season three, Lyla initially distrusted Barry after learning he altered her life while undoing the Flashpoint timeline, though she would later forgive him. After becoming the head of A.R.G.U.S. on Arrow, Lyla later assisted Team Flash by containing enemies S.T.A.R. Labs could not, such as Grodd, King Shark, and Bloodwork. During "Crisis on Infinite Earths," Lyla was turned into Harbinger after the Monitor recruited her to help him avert an impending crisis.
- Samantha Clayton (portrayed by Anna Hopkins) – The mother of Oliver Queen's unknown son William. She lives in Central City with her son after she lied to Oliver that she miscarried. Hopkins appears as the character on Arrow.
- Jason Rusch (portrayed by Luc Roderique) – A Hudson University graduate student and member of Martin Stein's research team on the F.I.R.E.S.T.O.R.M. project.
- Royal Flush Gang – A trio of bikers that are defeated by Flash.
  - King (portrayed by an uncredited actor) – Member of the Royal Flush Gang.
  - Queen (portrayed by an uncredited actor) – Member of the Royal Flush Gang.
  - Ace (portrayed by an uncredited actor) – Member of the Royal Flush Gang.
- Shawna Baez / Peek-a-Boo (portrayed by Britne Oldford) – A metahuman with the ability to teleport. She was being held in the S.T.A.R. Labs prison before being set free by Leonard Snart. She briefly reappears in season four's premiere, where she is recaptured by Kid Flash and Vibe.
- Clarissa Stein (portrayed by Isabella Hofmann) – Martin Stein's wife.
- Anthony Bellows (portrayed by Vito D'Ambrosio) – A former police officer who became the Mayor of Central City. His corruption was later exposed by the Flash and Elongated Man and he was arrested by Joe West. Bellows is succeeded as mayor by Van Buren.
- Dante Ramon (portrayed by Nicholas Gonzalez) – Cisco Ramon's older unambitious brother. Though they originally have a strained relationship due to their respective jealousies, they later try to reconcile their relationship. Barry resets the timeline to undo the Flashpoint timeline, resulting in Dante being killed by a drunk driver which briefly threatened Cisco and Barry's relationship.
  - Gonzalez also portrays the Earth-2 version of the character, Rupture, who wants revenge on Team Flash for killing Reverb, misled by Zoom to the circumstances of his brother's death. Rupture is ultimately killed by Zoom.
- Axel Walker / Trickster (portrayed by Devon Graye) – A young copycat of the original Trickster (James Jesse) who is his father.
- James Jesse / Trickster (portrayed by Mark Hamill) – A terrorist serving a life sentence in Iron Heights. Barry and Joe seek his aid to stop Axel Walker, a new Trickster emulating him. After his first defeat by the Flash, Jesse becomes obsessed with the speedster. Hamill reprises the role from the 1990 television series; it is later retroactively established that the James Jesse of Earth-90 and Earth-1 led near identical lives during that era.
  - Hamill also portrays the Earth-3 version of the character who is Jay Garrick's enemy.
- Brie Larvan (portrayed by Emily Kinney) – A female version of DC Comics character Bug-Eyed Bandit. She is a narcissistic technical genius and killer who becomes a rival to Felicity Smoak. She later appears as a member of the Young Rogues alongside Weather Witch and Rag Doll, with the three captured by Team Flash during a heist on McCulloch Technologies.
- Ray Palmer / Atom (portrayed by Brandon Routh) – A scientist, inventor and businessman who is the CEO of Palmer Technologies. He becomes friends with Cisco due to their shared fondness for advanced technologies. Routh recurs as the character on Arrow and is a regular on Legends of Tomorrow. In season eight, Ray Palmer visits Central City to attends Tech Con and had a rough start with Chester Runk. After assisting in the fight against Despero, Ray opens up the Quincy P. Runk Foundation. He later talks with Team Flash about their encounters with the time remnant version of Eobard Thawne.
  - In the Reverse-Flashpoint timeline, Ray was mentioned to have been among the Legends killed by Damien Darhk and Reverse-Flash leading to Ryan Choi succeeding him.
  - Routh also portrays the Superman of Earth-96, reprising the role from Superman Returns with elements of the Kingdom Come incarnation of the character.
- Hannibal Bates / Everyman (portrayed by Martin Novotny) – A metahuman with the ability to shapeshift, changing his appearance to resemble others. Owing to his powers, several other actors portrayed the character's various disguises (Chris Webb, Barbara Wallace, Laiken Laverock and Maxine Miller), including various series regulars. When Earth-Prime was formed, Barry listed Everyman as a suspect to Cecile about the imposter Iris when Vibe mentions that he is alive on Earth-Prime before having dismissed that theory.
- Tess Morgan (portrayed by Bre Blair) - The wife of Earth-1 Harrison Wells and another victim of Eobard Thawne.
  - The Earth-2 version of the character (who is also deceased) is mentioned as the wife of Harry Wells and the mother of Jesse Quick.
- Jake Simmons / Deathbolt (portrayed by Doug Jones) – A metahuman with the ability to harness and weaponize plasma energy, reprising his role from Arrow. As Simmons was not in Central City when the particle accelerator exploded, he gained his powers through other means. He is killed by Leonard Snart in "Rogue Air" because Snart claimed "he owed me money."

=== Introduced in season two ===
- Albert Rothstein / Atom Smasher (portrayed by Adam Copeland) – A metahuman from Earth-2 with incredible strength and the ability to grow to an enormous size. He dies of radiation poisoning after battling the Flash, though not before he reveals he was sent by Zoom with promises to return home.
  - Copeland also portrays the Earth-1 version of the character, a nuclear plant worker who was preemptively killed by Atom Smasher to fool Zoom in taking his identity.
- Eddie Slick / Sand Demon (portrayed by Kett Turton) – A metahuman from Earth-2 with the ability to transform his body into sand. He has had encounters with "the Flash" (Hunter Zolomon) on Earth-2 and is killed by the Flash (Barry Allen) on Earth-1. He is based on the DC Comics character of the same name.
  - Turton also portrays the Earth-1 version of Slick, a career criminal and arsonist who never became a metahuman.
- Lewis Snart (portrayed by Michael Ironside) – A former police officer, career criminal, and the estranged abusive father of Leonard and Lisa Snart. He was killed by Leonard out of revenge.
- Henry Hewitt (portrayed by Demore Barnes) – A scientist who was affected by the particle accelerator explosion and a potential candidate to become Firestorm after Ronnie sacrificed himself. After being deemed unsuitable however, he acquired powers from the attempted merge and tried to kill Caitlin Snow and Jefferson Jackson, only to be defeated by the Flash and the new Firestorm before being remanded to the S.T.A.R. Labs pipeline.
  - Barnes also portrays the Earth-2 version of Hewitt, a kindly human scientist at S.T.A.R. Labs who works under Harry Wells.
- Jefferson "Jax" Jackson / Firestorm (portrayed by Franz Drameh) – A former athlete who became injured and worked as an auto mechanic. He was chosen to replace Ronnie Raymond as Firestorm's other half with Martin Stein.
- Shay Lamden / King Shark (portrayed by Dan Payne as a human, voiced by David Hayter as King Shark) – A shark-like metahuman from Earth-2 who is sent by Zoom to kill the Flash. He was formerly a marine biologist who was mutated in an accident. The Earth-1 version of his wife, marine biologist Tanya Lamden, was brought in by A.R.G.U.S. to work on her late husband's counterpart; inventing a telepathy crown to communicate with him. Showrunner Andrew Kreisberg has stated that the character was originally introduced in The Flash: Season Zero comic because they would not have been able to create him for the series. He also added that in his initial appearance, it "was a very expensive 30 seconds of the show", and the producers did not think they could afford to do a whole episode with him, "so the idea was that he was one of Zoom's minions".
- Vandal Savage / Hath-Set (portrayed by Casper Crump) – A 4,000-year-old immortal who had manipulated leaders throughout history in an attempt to gain dominion over the entire world.
- Malcolm Merlyn / Dark Archer (portrayed by John Barrowman) – The leader of the League of Assassins, archenemy of Oliver Queen, and the biological father of Thea Queen. Barrowman stars as the character on Arrow.
- Carter Hall / Khufu / Hawkman (portrayed by Falk Hentschel) – The latest reincarnation of an Egyptian prince who is fated to reincarnate throughout time along with his soulmate, Hawkgirl. He is based on the DC Comics character of the same name
- Thea Queen (portrayed by Willa Holland) – Oliver Queen's half-sister who began to operate as a vigilante, replacing Roy Harper as "Speedy". Holland stars as the character on Arrow.
- Damien Darhk (portrayed by Neal McDonough) – A former member of the League of Assassins and leader of his own clandestine group, H.I.V.E. McDonough appears as the character on Arrow.
  - McDonough also portrays a Reverse-Flashpoint version of him. In this timeline, Darhk was assisted by Reverse-Flash in slaying most of the Legends and Cisco Ramon. After being released from prison due to a technicality, Damien was in his penthouse when Barry approaches him for help. After using his Time Stone to see into Barry's true future as well as the fact that his daughter Nora is still alive there, Darhk agreed to help Barry. As Barry reaches the speeds needed to undo the Reverse-Flashpoint at the cost of the armageddon that Despero witnessed, Darhk coordinated him while fighting Frost and Chillblaine before being defeated by Ryan Choi and Sentinel. Darhk delayed his fading with the Time Stone. After Despero is defeated and Thawne is depowered, Darhk appears where he is briefly attacked by Mia for what happened to Laurel Lance. After a talk with Joe, Darhk gives him the Time Stone stating that it will come in handy some day. Darhk then fades away and Nora appears in his place.
- Russell Glosson / Turtle (portrayed by Aaron Douglas) – A metahuman who can slow down his surroundings by absorbing kinetic energy. Following his defeat by the Flash, he is killed by Harry Wells.
- Joey Monteleone / Tar Pit (portrayed by Marco Grazzini) – A metahuman with the ability to transform into molten asphalt.
- Floyd Lawton (portrayed by Michael Rowe) – A CCPD detective and partner of Iris West-Allen on Earth-2. He is not very adept at aiming and handling a gun, earning him the derogatory nickname, "Deadshot". Rowe previously appeared as the Earth-1 version of Lawton on Arrow.
- Adam Fells / Geomancer (portrayed by Adam Stafford) – A metahuman with the ability to create earthquakes.
- Scott Evans (portrayed by Tone Bell) – The editor of Central City Picture News following Eric Larkin's death and a love interest for Iris West.
- Tanya Lamden (portrayed by Haley Beauchamp in season two, Zibby Allen in season five) - A marine biologist and wife of the late Earth-1 Shay Lamden who Cisco and Caitlin ask about while locating his Earth-2 counterpart, King Shark. She was later brought in by A.R.G.U.S. to work on the aforementioned metahuman. As of season five, she invented a telepathy crown to communicate with him. When Barry, Caitlin, and Cisco visited her to test their metahuman cure on him, the telepathy crown was stolen by Grodd. After Shay sacrificed his humanity to help defeat Grodd, Tanya continued to care for him.
- Eliza Harmon / Trajectory (portrayed by Allison Paige) – An "exceptionally bright scientist with a split personality a la Jekyll and Hyde" from Mercury Labs. She helped Caitlin Snow with the Velocity 9 formula to try and restore Jay Garrick's lost speed. Even though Caitlin never gave her the full formula, Eliza managed to reverse engineer the drug and became addicted to it; manifesting an "evil" personality to justify her actions. Taking the name "Trajectory", she soon became a criminal speedster and causing havoc in Central City. After the Flash defeats Trajectory, she takes a second dose of Velocity-9 and disintegrates. Her costume is subsequently recovered, modified, and given to Jesse Quick while her death causes Barry to realize "Jay Garrick" is actually Zoom.
- James Zolomon (portrayed by Shaine Jones) - Hunter Zolomon's father as well as a veteran of the War of the Americas.
- Ashley Zolomon (portrayed by Tatyana Forrest) - Hunter Zolomon's mother who was murdered which traumatized their son.
- Griffin Grey (portrayed by Haig Sutherland) – A metahuman who gained super-strength as well as terminal progeria as a side effect. He demands a cure from Harry Wells, mistaking him for the Earth-1 Harrison Wells. During his fight with the Flash, Griffin dies from the final stages of his metahuman side-effect and regresses to his original age.

=== Introduced in season three ===
- Edward Clariss / Rival (portrayed by Todd Lasance) – A black-suited speedster who was the archenemy of Kid Flash in the Flashpoint timeline. In the restored timeline, Alchemy restored Clariss' powers. As the Rival, he tried to kill Barry only to be defeated by him and later murdered by Savitar.
- Julio Mendez (portrayed by Alex Désert) – A CCPD captain in the Flashpoint timeline and a musician in the regular timeline. Désert reprises his role from the 1990 series of the same name.
- Frances "Frankie" Kane / Magenta (portrayed by Joey King) – A metahuman with magnetic abilities. She originally had powers in the Flashpoint timeline before Alchemy restored them in the regular timeline.
- Sam Scudder / Mirror Master (portrayed by Grey Damon) – A metahuman with the ability to travel through reflective surface, boyfriend of Rosa Dillon, and former member of Leonard Snart's gang before the particle accelerator explosion. In season seven, Mirror Master and Rosalind Dillon are revealed to be working with Black Hole. It was also revealed that Mirror Master was the original mirror creation of Eva McCulloch as she shatters him upon his purpose being served.
- Rosalind "Rosa" Dillon / Top (portrayed by Ashley Rickards) – A metahuman and girlfriend of Sam Scudder with the ability to induce crippling vertigo via eye contact. She is based on the DC Comics character, Top. In season seven, Rosalind and Sam are revealed to be working with Black Hole.
- Shade (portrayed by Mike McLeod) – A metahuman who can vibrate his molecules to appear as a shadow.
- Judge Hankerson (portrayed by Ken Camroux-Taylor) – A Central City judge who oversaw the trials for Heat Monger, Barry Allen, Weather Witch, and Allegra Garcia. In season eight, it is mentioned that Hankerson is retiring.
- Joanie (portrayed by Riley Jade Berglund) – The eldest daughter of Cecile Horton and the older maternal half-sister of Jenna West.
- Tom Patterson (portrayed by Greg Grunberg) – A detective based in Central City.
- Sara Lance / White Canary (portrayed by Caity Lotz) – The younger sister of Laurel Lance, Star City vigilante, former League of Assassins member, acting captain of the timeship Waverider, and leader of the Legends. The character is partially based on the Black Canary and was first introduced on Arrow. Lotz recurs as the character on Arrow and is a regular on Legends of Tomorrow.
  - In "Crisis on Earth-X", Sara's Earth-X counterpart is said to have been killed by Sturmbannführer Quentin Lance after he discovered she was bisexual.
  - In the Reverse-Flashpoint timeline, Sara was mentioned to have been among the Legends that were killed by Damien Darhk and Reverse-Flash.
- Lily Stein (portrayed by Christina Brucato) – The scientist daughter of Martin Stein.
- Jared Morillo / Plunder (portrayed by Stephen Huszar) – A jewel thief who uses futuristic technology.
- Clive Yorkin (portrayed by Matthew Kevin Anderson) – A metahuman who can disintegrate anything he touches. He originally had these powers in the Flashpoint timeline before Alchemy restored them in the new timeline.
- Eve Teschmacher (portrayed by Andrea Brooks) – James Olsen's assistant at CatCo Media on Earth-38. Brooks reprises her role from Supergirl.
- Solovar (voiced by Keith David) – A sentient albino gorilla and leader of Gorilla City on Earth-2. In season six, a mental manifestation of Solovar appeared as a gatekeeper preventing Barry and Grodd's minds from separating, forcing them to work together to defeat him. As of yet, the real Solovar's fate is unknown.
- Accelerated Man (portrayed by Sean Poague) – A Speed Force conduit and Earth-19's version of the Flash.
- Music Meister (portrayed by Darren Criss) – An extra-dimensional being with the ability to hypnotize people and send them into a self-created dream world. If his victim is a metahuman, he can also siphon their abilities.
- J'onn J'onzz / Martian Manhunter (portrayed by David Harewood) – An extraterrestrial superhero, the last Green Martian, and director of the Department of Extranormal Operations (DEO) who resides on Earth-38. Harewood reprises his role from Supergirl.
- Winslow "Winn" Schott Jr. (portrayed by Jeremy Jordan) A friend of Supergirl and son of the criminal Toyman who works as a DEO desk agent on Earth-38. Jordan reprises his role from Supergirl.
  - Jordan also portrays the Earth-X version, General Schott, leader of the resistance against the New Reich during the "Crisis on Earth-X" crossover.
- Mon-El (portrayed by Chris Wood) – A Daxamite prince with similar powers as Supergirl and her romantic partner from Earth-38. Wood reprises his role from Supergirl.
- Phillippe / Abra Kadabra (portrayed by David Dastmalchian) – A time-traveling criminal from a distant future whose advanced technological powers seem like magic. Sometime after the Crisis in season seven, Abra Kadaba returned to Flash's time with a plot to destroy Central City with an anti-matter bomb in light of the reset Multiverse erasing his family. Flash was able to talk him down where he mentioned that he lost Oliver Queen. When that worked, both of them were attacked by Fuerza which absorbs the blast of the anti-matter bomb and kills Abra Kadabra. Team Flash later stated that Abra Kadabra "died a hero".
- Lucious Coolidge / Heat Monger (portrayed by Richard Zeman) – An arsonist who operated in Central City while Heat Wave was "off the grid".

=== Introduced in season four ===
- Ramsey Deacon / Kilg%re (portrayed by Dominic Burgess) – A former computer programmer turned technopath after DeVoe turned him into a metahuman. DeVoe later killed him and stole his powers.
- Rebecca "Becky" Sharpe / Hazard (portrayed by Sugar Lyn Beard) – A metahuman created by DeVoe with the power to manipulate luck, giving herself good luck while jinxing everyone around her, before DeVoe stole her body and powers. In season nine, Becky's death was undone following the "Crisis on Infinite Earths" and she got engaged to Dominic Stewart. After that, she suffered from bad luck and found herself accused of placing Dominic in a coma. Cecile and Allegra found out that Dominic's brother Tony was responsible so that he can harness Becky's powers to help pay off his debts using a special device in the engagement ring that Tony previously gave her. Once Cecile got the ring off of Becky, she helps Cecile and Allegra defeat Tony and his minions.
- Weeper (portrayed by Matt Afonso) – A metahuman created by DeVoe whose tears induce psycho-active drug-like effects when ingested. He was originally Amunet Black's prisoner before he was captured by DeVoe and killed offscreen for his tears.
- Mina Chaytan (portrayed by Chelsea Kurtz) – A cultural anthropology professor who gained the ability to bring effigies to life after DeVoe turned her into a metahuman. DeVoe later killed her for her powers. She is inspired by the DC Comics villain Black Bison.
- David "Big Sir" Ratchet (portrayed by Bill Goldberg) – An inmate at Iron Heights Prison who Sylbert Rundine framed for the death of a Mercury Labs security guard. After Barry learns Rundine will not confess to the crime, Barry used his abilities to relocate David to Jaiju, China.
- Alex Danvers / Sentinel (portrayed by Chyler Leigh) – The adoptive sister of Kara Danvers and second-in-command of the DEO. Leigh reprises her role from Supergirl.
  - Leigh also portrayed the Reverse-Flashpoint version of Sentinel. She was among the guests to the wedding of Eobard Thawne and Iris West.
- Ray Terrill / The Ray (portrayed by Russell Tovey) – A displaced hero from Earth-1 who chose to stay on Earth-X to fight the New Reich.
- Dinah Drake / Black Canary (portrayed by Juliana Harkavy) - A metahuman and former CCPD detective who joined Team Arrow as the new Black Canary. Harkavy reprises her role from Arrow.
- Dominic Lanse / Brainstorm (portrayed by Kendrick Sampson) – A metahuman who gained telepathic powers from DeVoe. He was originally in Amunet Black's custody before he was transferred to DeVoe, who killed him for his body and powers.
- Anton Slater (portrayed by Mark Valley) – Central City's district attorney who prosecuted Barry during his trial.
- Neil Borman / Fallout (portrayed by Ryan Alexander McDonald) – A truck driver gained radioactive abilities after DeVoe turned him into a metahuman. Despite being transferred to an A.R.G.U.S. facility, Borman was captured by DeVoe and used as a battery for his Enlightenment satellites; killing Borman in the process.
- Zoey Clark / Prank (portrayed by Corinne Bohrer) – James Jesse's partner-in-crime and mother of their son Axel Walker. Bohrer reprises her role from the 1990 television series of the same name.
- Beebo (voiced by Benjamin Diskin) – The Trickster and Prank were using a Beebo toy as a test subject by borrowing acid and melting the toy. Diskin reprises his role from Legends of Tomorrow.
- Josh / Breacher (portrayed by Danny Trejo) – A bounty hunter from Earth-19 and the father of Gypsy who possesses similar powers as his daughter and Cisco.
- Sylbert Rundine / Dwarfstar (portrayed by Derek Mears) – A metahuman who can shrink or enlarge any object. He is later killed by DeVoe for his powers.
- Van Buren (portrayed by Kendall Cross) – The Mayor of Central City who succeeded Anthony Bellows. She resigns in season five following Spencer Young's arrest.
- Earl Cox (portrayed by Paul McGillion) – A friend of Ralph Dibny.
- Izzy Bowin (portrayed by Miranda MacDougall) – A female country and western fiddler who gained the ability to fire concussive soundwaves from her body after DeVoe turned her into a metahuman. She was later killed by DeVoe for her body and powers. She is inspired by the DC Comics villain Fiddler.
- Janet Petty / Null (portrayed by Bethany Brown) – A petty criminal who gained the ability to manipulate gravity after DeVoe turned her into a metahuman. She is later killed by DeVoe for her powers.
- Matthew Kim / Melting Point (portrayed by Leonardo Nam) – A metahuman who gained the ability to transfer other metahumans' abilities to another person from DeVoe. He was later killed by DeVoe for his powers.
- Eric Frye (portrayed by Oliver Rice) – A formerly pyrokinetic metahuman who lost his powers when Matthew Kim accidentally transferred them to Jaco Birch. Sometime after Earth-Prime is formed, Eric was mentioned to have pyrokinesis again when Cecile Horton represented him upon being accused of burning down a building.
- Jaco Birch / Hotness (portrayed by Max Adler) – A formerly ordinary man who received pyrokinetic powers when Matthew Kim accidentally transferred them to him from Eric Frye. He was defeated by Iris when she accidentally gained super-speed and was remanded to Iron Heights Penitentiary. Sometime after Earth-Prime was formed, Jaco still has his pyrokinetics, was released from prison on parole where he got a job as an arena security guard, and is a suspect in the incineration of Stan Mullen who he had an argument with the night before as well as Donna Winters. He was proven innocent when he wanted to be with his son Harold. In season nine, Hotness assists Team Flash in fighting Red Death and his minions. At one point during his duel with Fiddler, it was revealed that Hotness and Fiddler are mutual fans of Nine Inch Nails.
- Edwin Gauss / Folded Man (portrayed by Arturo Del Puerto) – A metahuman who gained the ability to create portals to pocket dimensions, or "folds", from DeVoe. He is later killed by DeVoe for his body and powers.

Jason Mewes and Kevin Smith cameo as Central City Museum security guards named Jay and Bob.

=== Introduced in season five ===
- William Lang / Gridlock (portrayed by Daniel Cudmore) – A kinetic energy-absorbing metahuman. After being defeated by Flash, Kid Flash, and XS, he was intercepted by Cicada, who used a meta-tech dagger to kill him.
- Vanessa Jansen / Block (portrayed by Erin Cummings) – A criminal who was betrayed by the East Street Skulls. After developing the ability to create box-shaped force-fields, she tried to take revenge on Bobby Moretti, one of the leaders before Flash and XS intervened and stopped them. Before she could be incarcerated, she was stabbed by Cicada. XS sped her body to the hospital only for Block to succumb to her wounds on the way there.
- Bruno Moretti (portrayed by Matty Finochio) – One of the leaders of the East Street Skulls street gang.
- Spencer Young (portrayed by Kiana Madeira) – A former journalist at Central City Picture News turned blogger and creator of the "Spyn Zone" app. Her smartphone was exposed to a fragment of DeVoe's Enlightenment satellite which gave it the ability to control people's minds upon typing about them. Spencer used her smartphone to endanger peoples' lives to increase her app popularity as well as brainwash XS before the Flash disarmed her and sent her to Iron Heights. She is inspired by the DC Comics villain Spin.
- Peter Merkel / Rag Doll (portrayed by Troy James, voiced by Phil LaMarr) – A criminal who was crushed by shrapnel from DeVoe's Enlightenment satellite, which gave him the ability to stretch and contort himself in a nightmarish manner. He stole or destroyed other peoples' most treasured items and kidnapped Barry Allen before being defeated by the Elongated Man and remanded to Iron Heights. He was later recruited by Nora West-Allen as part of her Young Rogues and by the criminal organization Black Hole to kill Joe West on two separate occasions, though he was defeated in both cases.
- Raelene Sharp (portrayed by Cassandra Ebner) – A metahuman with the ability to form blades from her arms. She is killed by Cicada as part of his vendetta.
- Del Toro (portrayed by Julianne Christie) - The warden of Iron Heights and successor of Gregory Wolfe who worked to undo the infamy surrounding Iron Heights.
- Joslyn "Joss" Jackam / Weather Witch (portrayed by Reina Hardesty) – The estranged daughter of Mark Mardon and niece of Clyde Mardon was fired from her meteorologist job after her weather experiments become too dangerous. A part of her van was struck with a fragment from DeVoe's Enlightenment satellite, which she turned into a staff that enabled her to control the weather like the Mardons. She attempted to exact revenge against her father, only to be defeated by the Flash using Mardon's weather control wand. She later escaped police custody with Silver Ghost's help before abandoning her in Bolivia and joining Nora West-Allen's Young Rogues, only to be captured by Team Flash during a heist on McCulloch Technologies.
- John Deegan (portrayed by Jeremy Davies) – A psychologist from Gotham City who was given the Book of Destiny by the Monitor to rewrite reality according to his whims.
- Clark Kent / Superman (portrayed by Tyler Hoechlin) – A reporter at the Daily Planet, defender of Metropolis, and cousin of Supergirl from Earth-38. Hoechlin reprises the role from Supergirl.
- Lois Lane (portrayed by Elizabeth Tulloch) – A reporter at the Daily Planet on Earth-38 and Superman's love interest.
- A.M.A.Z.O. – An android created by Ivo Laboratories on behalf of A.R.G.U.S. who can mimic metahuman abilities.
- Raya Van Zandt / Silver Ghost (portrayed by Gabrielle Walsh) - A skilled ex-pilot with the call sign "Silver Ghost" and expert in vehicles who mysteriously obtained a meta-tech key fob that allows her to control vehicles.
- Carl Bork (portrayed by Andre Tricoteux) - A metahuman criminal with super-strength and associate of Norvok's who was killed by Cicada.
- Goldface / Keith Kanyon (portrayed by Damion Poitier) - A metahuman criminal in the black market business who can turn his skin to gold and manipulate golden items. He is also the boyfriend of Blacksmith. In season eight, Goldface and his men were sent by Blacksmith to raid the Central City Police Department for the meta-bullets. He was defeated by Kristen Kramer. In season nine, Goldface was revealed to have gotten a reduced sentence after mentioning that Blacksmith was the one who ordered the raid on CCPD. He is among those who help Team Flash fight Red Death and her minions.
- Renee Adler (portrayed by Kimberly Williams-Paisley) - A librarian with telekinetic abilities who Sherloque falls in love with as part of Thawne's plan to take the detective off his and Nora's scent. She is also the Earth-1 version of his many ex-wives.
  - Williams-Paisley also portrays four of Sherloque's five ex-wives, Adler's doppelgängers from four separate Earths. Though she is not seen, it is implied that the remaining one is another version of Adler from Earth-38.
- Philip Master / Acid Master (portrayed by John Gillich) - An acid-generating metahuman who fought Killer Frost before being sent to the S.T.A.R. Labs pipeline so that an older Grace as Cicada could not kill him.
- Vickie Bolen (portrayed by Catherine Lough Haggquist) - An explosive metahuman who accidentally killed Grace Gibbons' parents. She was targeted by an older Grace as Cicada before XS got her to safety.
- Alice Bolen (portrayed by Malia Baker) - The daughter of Vickie and John Bolen.
- John Bolen (portrayed by Chris Shields) - The husband of Vickie Bolen who was targeted by Cicada II before Flash rescued him.

=== Introduced in season six ===
- Rachel Rosso (portrayed by Meera Simhan) – A doctor and the mother of Ramsey Rosso who helped Caitlin Snow become a doctor herself. When she came down with HLH, she chose to accept her fate. However, her son saw this as a betrayal and grew angry with her; believing she was giving up when she should have been fighting back.
- Mitch Romero (portrayed by Shawn Stewart) – An arms dealer who Ramsey Rosso tries to buy a dark matter-based gun from, only to be killed by the doctor's powers. While Rosso tries to examine what happened to him, Romero becomes a zombie-like creature and attacks him. Following said attack, he attacks and kills his own crew to steal dark matter and strengthen himself before attacking S.T.A.R. Labs. Barry and Killer Frost overdose him on dark matter and destroy him.
- Remington Meister (portrayed by Carlo Rota) – A German crime lord who held an auction for a weaponized satellite in Midway City before he was foiled and arrested by Barry Allen and Ralph Dibny.
- Joan Williams (portrayed by Michelle Harrison) - A scientist on Earth-3 who is married to Jay Garrick and resembles Nora Allen. In season seven sometime after the Crisis, Joan is living on Earth-Prime in Keystone City. After helping Jay regain his super-speed, Joan hears about the Godspeed Drones attacking Central City. Before going to tend to the patient, Joan advises Jay to be careful. Following Godspeed's defeat, Joan was present when Barry and Iris renew their vows.
- Lex Luthor (portrayed by Jon Cryer) – An enemy of Superman and Supergirl's from Earth-38 that the Monitor recruited to avert the Crisis. Cryer reprises his role from Supergirl.
- Jim Corrigan (portrayed by Stephen Lobo) – A police officer from an unspecified Earth who housed the Spectre before passing its power onto Oliver Queen so he could save the multiverse.
- Ryan Choi (portrayed by Osric Chau) – An Ivy Town University scientist, fan of Ray Palmer, and miniaturization expert who was recruited to help avert a multiverse-destroying Crisis. Before making his first physical appearance, Choi was previously mentioned when Nora West-Allen states he was the one who developed Barry's Flash ring suit.
  - Chau also portrays the Reverse-Flashpoint version of Choi. He has succeeded Ray as the Atom ever since Ray was among those killed in battle against Damien Darhk and Reverse-Flash.
- Kate Kane / Batwoman (portrayed by Ruby Rose) – The cousin of Bruce Wayne who took over Wayne Enterprises and his crime-fighting duties after he mysteriously disappeared. Rose reprises her role from Batwoman.
- Mia Smoak / Green Arrow (portrayed by Katherine McNamara) – The daughter of Green Arrow who the Monitor brought from the year 2040 to help avert the Crisis. In season eight, Mia arrives in 2021 looking for William as she tracks down Thawne instead. She mentioned to Iris about her mission and suggested that she speaks with Felicity. Mia is briefly mind-controlled by Despero to finish off a fading Thawne. After Despero is defeated and Thawne is depowered, Mia holds back her attack on Damien Darhk for what she did to Laurel Lance. Then she takes Iris' advice to speak to Felicity. McNamara reprises her role from Arrow.
- John Constantine (portrayed by Matt Ryan) – An enigmatic and irreverent former con man turned reluctant supernatural detective and Legends member. Ryan reprises his role from Constantine and Legends of Tomorrow.
- Helena Kyle / Huntress (portrayed by Ashley Scott) – A half-metahuman superheroine from Earth-203 and the daughter of her world's Batman and Catwoman. Scott reprises her role from Birds of Prey.
- Lucifer Morningstar (portrayed by Tom Ellis) – The Lord of Hell who retired to become a nightclub owner and consultant to the LAPD on Earth-666. He helped Constantine's group get into Purgatory. Ellis reprises his role from Lucifer.
- Jefferson Pierce / Black Lightning (portrayed by Cress Williams) – A teacher with electrical powers from an unspecified Earth that Barry and his allies recruited to help them avert the crisis. In season eight, Black Lightning helped Barry in trying to avert the armageddon that Despero foresaw and gave him some advice on what it means to be a hero. Williams reprises his role from Black Lightning.
- Black Hole – A secret organization specializing in unique tech and assassins with light-based abilities.
  - Joseph Carver (portrayed by Eric Nenninger) – The CEO of McCulloch Technologies and husband of Eva McCulloch who used his wife's technology for criminal means out of a belief that he was saving the world. Though he encountered resistance from Team Flash and CCPD, he was eventually killed by Eva.
  - Dr. Kimiyo Hoshi / Doctor Light (portrayed by Emmie Nagata) – A Black Hole assassin armed with a UV gun. Carver tasked her with killing Iris West when she interfered with Black Hole's operations before being calling her off. She was later swayed to Eva's side and became her bodyguard.
  - Millie Rawlins / Sunshine (portrayed by Natalie Sharp) - A ex-military special ops operative with the Department of Defense's covert division who went by the call sign "Sunshine". After she gained light-bending abilities from the particle accelerator, Sunshine became an operative of Black Hole. She was charged with stealing the prismatic refractor from Mercury Labs, only to defeated by Barry Allen and CCPD, who exploited her weakness of being solar powered. She was later freed from police custody by Rag Doll and later swayed to Eva's side, where she was provided special bracelets to help her maintain her abilities at night.
- Maurice (portrayed by Andrew J. Hampton) – Joseph Carver's personal assistant.
- Gene Huskk (portrayed by William MacDonald) – An informant for Iris with information on Black Hole. He formerly worked for McCulloch Technologies before he was fired and later killed by Doctor Light.
- John Loring (portrayed by Silver Kim) – A criminal that Sue Dearbon targeted for a diamond that she wanted. He is named after DC Comics character Jean Loring.
- Frida Novikov / Turtle (portrayed by Vanessa Walsh) - A chronokinetic metahuman who can create time bubbles. While planning her revenge for a failed crime spree, she is defeated by Flash, Kid Flash, and Joe West using a Velocity-X formula to negate her powers before Joe arrested her.
- Roderick Smith (portrayed by Joel Semande) – Hartley Rathaway's right-hand man and boyfriend in the post-Crisis timeline.
- Penelope Dearbon (portrayed by Nancy Hillis) – The mother of Sue Dearbon who is a known socialite. She was among the people that were replaced by Mirror Eva McCulloch's mirror duplicates before they were released from the Mirrorverse when Eva's plan was thwarted and the duplicates were destroyed. In season eight, it was mentioned that Penelope was arrested for her involvement with Black Hole.
- Richard Dearbon (portrayed by Mark Brandon) – The father of Sue Dearbon. He was among the people that were replaced by Mirror Eva McCulloch's mirror duplicates before they were released from the Mirrorverse when Eva's plan was thwarted and the duplicates were destroyed. In season eight, it was mentioned that Richard was arrested for his involvement with Black Hole.

Dina Meyer makes an uncredited vocal cameo in "Crisis on Infinite Earths: Part Three"; reprising her role as Barbara Gordon / Oracle from Birds of Prey.

=== Introduced in season seven ===
- Arielle Atkins (portrayed by Jessica Hayles) - The host of The Arielle Atkines Hour. Cisco once nicknamed her "Rachel Maddow 2.0".
- Quincy P. Runk (portrayed by Milton Barnes) - An inventor and the father of Chester who died in a car accident during the 90's.
- Chip Cooper (portrayed by Donny Lucas) - An A.R.G.U.S. agent who Kramer procures a copy of the meta-human cure from.
- Judge Tanaka (portrayed by Donna Soares) - A judge oversaw the trial of Frost.
- Councillor Strong (portrayed by Deb Podowski) - A councillor who prosecuted Frost. In season eight, Strong is among the people that Iris interviewed in her podcast following Frost's sacrificed. She mentioned that Frost forgave her for prosecuting her enough that Strong started defending metas.
- Carrie Bates / Rainbow Raider 2.0 (portrayed by Jona Xiao) - A metahuman and former collections officer whose rainbow abilities put anyone in a euphoric state. She used her powers to give money to the less fortunate. When it came to a hijacked blimp from Ferris Aircraft heading to a football game, Allegra helped to subdue Carrie as Flash advised her to abandon her idea. The district attorney was able to get Carrie some community service working on Mayor Sampson's economic development committee.
- Dr. Olsen (portrayed by Jonathon Young) - A doctor who worked for Black Hole. He was responsible for experimenting on Ultraviolet and even removed her vocal cords. Following Joseph Carver's death, Dr. Olsen continued his human experiments and sold them to the highest bidder which led him to be targeted by Ultraviolet. When Ultraviolet finds where Dr. Olsen was hiding, he offered to give Ultraviolet her vocal cords back if she takes down everyone who knows about the true nature of his work. During Ultraviolet's fight with Allegra, Dr. Olsen and Ultraviolet were knocked down by Allegra's new ability. Sue and Frost later mentioned to Allegra that Dr. Olsen has been remanded to Iron Heights.
- Adam Creyke (portrayed by Julian Black Antelope) - A metahuman of Wet'suwet'en descent who is a former United States Army soldier and childhood friend of Kristen Kramer that possesses invulnerability. He was responsible for selling out Kristen's military unit to an enemy side. Sometime later, Kramer and Joe West were able to track down Adam, apprehend him, and hand him over to the military.

=== Introduced in season eight ===
- Vanya (portrayed by Lindy Booth) - A reporter for the Central City Citizen Media.
- Aariz Mousa (porterayed by Shayan Bayat) - A reporter for the Central City Citizen Media.
- Royal Flush Gang - This incarnation consists of metahumans. They caused a train accident that was thwarted by Flash rescuing everyone on board, stole a specific microchip, and caused a prison break at Iron Heights Penitentiary so that they can obtain the services of Jared Haywood. Flash's super-thinking thwarted the Royal Flush Gang before they can rob the casinos and handed them over to the police. At the time when Nora and Bart visited December 31, 2013, to investigate the time anomaly that erased Joan Garrick, Mona overheard Nora and Bart talking and learned the term 'metahuman" which led to her finding similar metahumans to form the Royal Flush Gang. While Nora and Bart were able to let the Royal Flush Gang commit the heist, Nora was able to dispose of the bombs to lessen the casualties.
  - Mona Taylor / Queen (portrayed by Agam Darshi) - The leader of the Royal Flush Gang with psychic abilities. When Rosalind Dillon helped Cecile discover that she has psychic-siphoning abilities, Joe arranged for Cecile and Rosalind to speak with Mona at Iron Heights Penitentiary where the same ability worked on Queen. She was present when Cecile rescued Psych. After Thawne was defeated, it was mentioned that Mona regained her abilities and was returned to Iron Heights Penitentiary.
  - King (portrayed by Ryan Jefferson Booth) - A member of the Royal Flush Gang who has superhuman strength.
  - Jake Foh / Jack (portrayed by Eston Fung) - A member of the Royal Flush Gang who can shoot lasers out of his eyes.
  - Wanda Wayland / Ten (portrayed by Megan Peta Hill) - A member of the Royal Flush Gang with super-agility who is also an expert at hand-to-hand combat.
- Jared Haywood (portrayed by Shaun Omaid) - An espionage hacker at Iron Heights Penitentiary who was sprung out by the Royal Flush Gang during a prison break to help them get into the casino computers. Before they can dispose of him after he served their purpose, Flash rescued him and returned him to Iron Heights Penitentiary.
- Marcus (portrayed by Andres Soto) - A botanist who becomes Caitlin's boyfriend.
- Xotar (portrayed by Kandyse McClure) - A metahuman with mind-control and telekinesis from National City who brainwashed people into helping out with her heists. After being knocked down by Flash's lightning attacks, Xotar was placed in power-dampening cuffs and handed over to the police.
- Ryan Wilder / Batwoman (portrayed by Javicia Leslie) - The new Batwoman of Gotham City after the disappearance of Kate Kane. Some time before season 9, Ryan disappeared during a patrol a few weeks early. But she eventually returned and helped the Flash defeat the Red Death in Central City.
  - In the Reverse-Flashpoint timeline, she is married to Sophie Moore and attends Eobard and Iris' wedding representation. Leslie reprises her role from Batwoman.
- Nora Darhk (portrayed by Courtney Ford) - The daughter of Damien Darhk and wife of Ray Palmer. In the Reverse-Flashpoint timeline, Nora was mentioned to have died at some point. After Damien gives his Time Stone to Joe West, he fades away and Nora appears in his place as Joe states that he has a lot to tell her. Ford reprises her role from Legends of Tomorrow.
- Avery Ho (portrayed by Piper Curda) - A scientist at Fast Track Labs who is studying temporal dynamics at the time when Nora and Bart time-travel to December 31, 2013. To thwart the Royal Flush Gang's plan to kill people with their bombs, Nora and Bart had to reveal to her that they came from the future to find a way to lessen the casualties. In season nine, Avery is among those chosen by Flash's lightning.
- Stan Mullen (portrayed by Jag Bal) - The manager of O'Shaughnessy's.
- Donna Winters (portrayed by Lauren Jackson) - A bartender at O'Shaughnessy's.
- Harold Birch (portrayed by Nicholas Elia) - The son of Jaco Birch. When Jaco was suspected of murdering Stan Mullen, Jaco was placed in the custody of social services. It was mentioned in dialogue between Jaco and Cecile that Harold's mother has been in and out of Harold's life while barely taking care of him.
- Rosie Levin (portrayed by Tavia Cervi) - A social media influencer who is interviewed by Allegra and Taylor after being named Central City Citizen of the Week.
- Lydia Sanchez (portrayed by Kaitlyn Santa Juana) - A former inmate of Iron Heights and former member of the Arañas.
- Renee Wizzo (portrayed by Meghan Gardiner) - The mother of Tinya who gave birth to her when she was 16 and regretably put her up for adoption. Years later, Iris and Sue reunited Tinya with Renee. Due to Iris' time sickness, she accidentally caused Renee to disappear. This caused Renee to end up lost in the Still Force. She would later be freed when the Negative Fources are defeated.
- Mark Desmond / Blockbuster - A criminal who stole an experimental exosuit from Ivo Laboratories. Because of the grief following Frost's sacrifice, Team Flash had a hard time fighting Blockbuster. Following Frost's funeral, Team Flash defeated Blockbuster offscreen.

=== Introduced in season nine ===
- Michelle Amar / Murmur (portrayed by Alexandria Wailes) – Described as an "angry med student turned serial killer", Murmur is a masked villain with a stitched mouth who wields a special knife made from Wayne Enterprises tech who works for Red Death. She speaks through sign language which the other characters understand.
- Dominic Stewart (portrayed by Drew Henderson) – The fiancé of Becky Sharpe who was placed in a coma by his brother's minions. He would later awaken from a coma following Becky's good luck abilities returning.
- Tony Stewart (portrayed by Andrew Francis) – The brother of Dominic Stewart who gave Becky an engagement ring with a special diamond in it that would cause her to have bad luck while everyone else has good luck. He used her to help pay off his debts. Once Cecile and Allegra got the ring off during a brief blackout caused by Chester, Becky helps them defeat Tony and his minions. After that, Cecile has Chester call Kristen Kramer to have Tony and his minions arrested.
- Nia Nal / Dreamer (portrayed by Nicole Maines) – A half-Naltorian reporter at National City with precognition and astral projection and an ally of Supergirl's team. She travels to Central City to talk to Iris about her dream. Maines reprises her role from Supergirl.
- Original Dreamer (portrayed by Lily Yawson) – The first known Dreamer and earlier predecessor of Nia.
- Lady Chronos (portrayed by Diana Bang) – A time-traveling thief from the future.
- Max Mercury (portrayed by Trevor Carroll) – A man who is among those chosen by Flash's lightning.
- Jess Chambers (portrayed by Hana Destiny Huggins) – A non-binary character who is among those chosen by Flash's lightning.

== See also ==
- List of Arrow characters
- List of Legends of Tomorrow characters
- List of Arrowverse actors
- List of Supergirl characters
- List of Black Lightning characters
- List of Batwoman characters
