= List of awards and nominations received by The Flash =

Awards and nominations received by The Flash
Awards and nominations
Award	Wins	Nominations
BMI Film, TV & Visual Media Awards	6	6
Critics' Choice Super Awards	0	4
Dragon Awards	0	1
Guinness World Records	2	2
Hollywood Post Alliance Awards	0	2
Hugo Awards	0	1
IGN Awards	4	17
ICG Publicists Awards	0	1
Kids' Choice Awards	0	11
Leo Awards	7	19
MTV Movie & TV Awards	0	2
People's Choice Awards	1	5
Poppy Awards	0	2
Primetime Emmy Awards	0	1
Saturn Awards	7	23
SFX Awards	0	5
TCA Awards	0	1
Teen Choice Awards	6	27
TV Guide Awards	1	1
UBCP/ACTRA Awards	0	8
Visual Effects Society Awards	0	1

Totals (Note: Certain award groups do not simply award one winner. They acknowledge several different recipients, have runners-up, and have third place. Since this is a specific recognition and is different from losing an award, runner-up mentions are considered wins in this award tally. For simplification and to avoid errors, each award in this list has been presumed to have had a prior nomination.)
- Wins: 34
- Nominations: 140

The Flash is an American superhero television series developed for The CW by Greg Berlanti, Andrew Kreisberg, and Geoff Johns, based on the DC Comics character Barry Allen / Flash. It is set in the Arrowverse, sharing continuity with the other television series of the franchise, and is a spin-off of Arrow. The series premiered on October 7, 2014, and ran for 9 seasons, ending on May 24, 2023. Grant Gustin stars as Barry, a crime scene investigator who gains superhuman speed, which he uses to fight criminals, including others who have also gained superhuman abilities.

The series has been a candidate for television awards in a variety of categories recognizing its writing, acting, directing, production, score, and visual effects. The Flash has been nominated for many awards, including six BMI Film, TV & Visual Media Awards (won all), two Hollywood Post Alliance Awards, one Hugo Award, seventeen IGN Awards (winning four), eleven Kids' Choice Awards, eighteen Leo Awards (winning seven), two MTV Movie & TV Awards, five People's Choice Awards (winning one), one Primetime Emmy Award, twenty-three Saturn Awards (winning seven), one TCA Award, twenty-seven Teen Choice Awards (winning six), one TV Guide Award (won), and one Visual Effects Society Award. Gustin is the most decorated of the show's cast, with thirty nominations and seven wins. The show also holds the world records for "Most in-demand superhero TV show" and "Most in-demand action and adventure TV show" from the Guinness World Records.

== Total awards and nominations for the cast ==
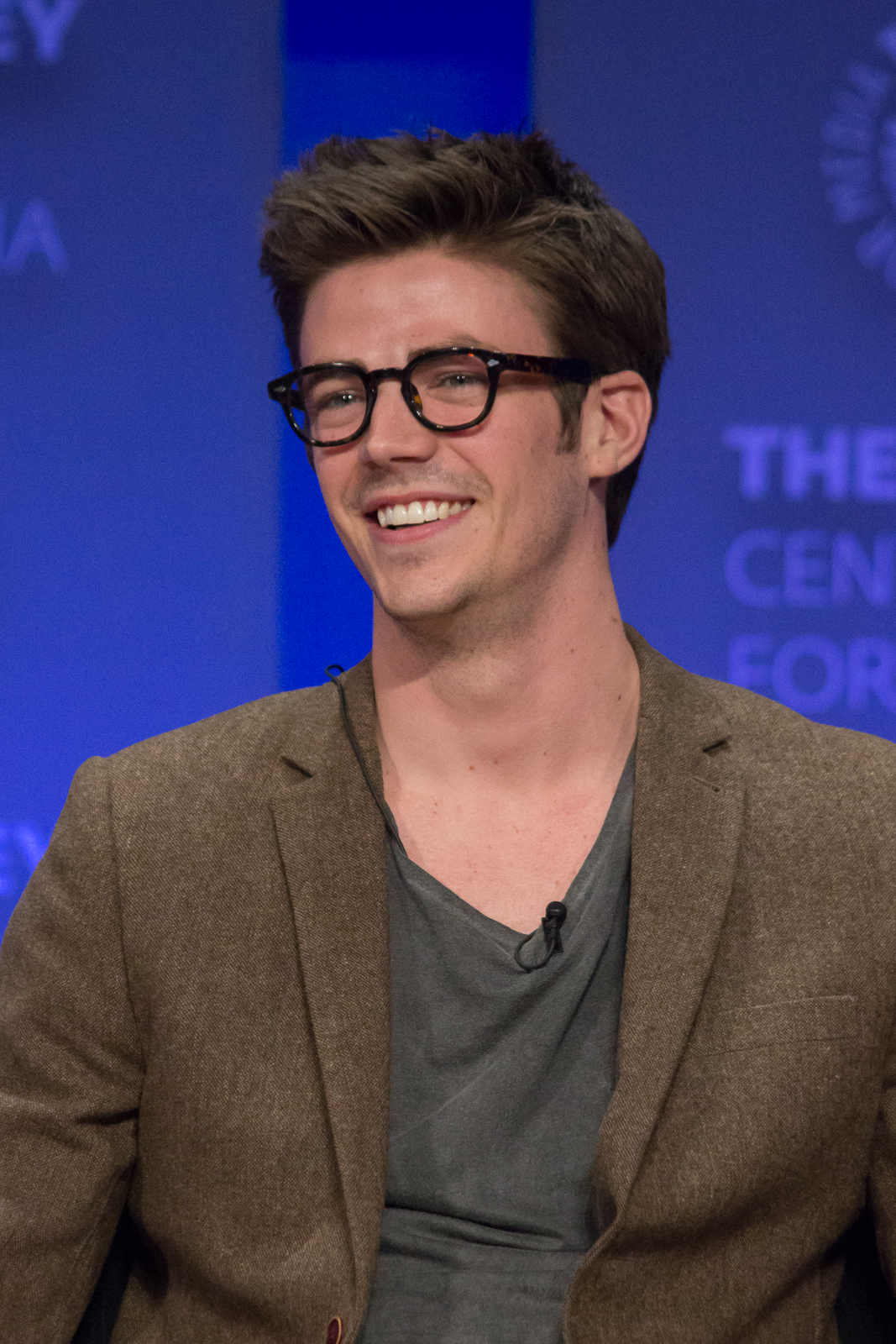
Grant Gustin is the series's most successful cast member in terms of awards, having won 7 from 31 nominations.

Total awards and nominations for the cast
Actor	Character(s)	Tenure	Nominations	Awards
Grant Gustin	Barry Allen / Flash	2014–2023	31	7
Candice Patton	Iris West-Allen	2014–2023	12	1
Wentworth Miller	Leonard Snart / Captain Cold	2014–2017	1	1
Danielle Panabaker	Caitlin Snow / Killer Frost / Khione	2014–2023	7	1
Tom Cavanagh	Harrison Wells; Eobard Thawne / Reverse-Flash	2014–2023	4	0
Emily Bett Rickards	Felicity Smoak	2014–2016	1	0
Jesse L. Martin	Joe West	2014–2023	1	0
Logan Williams	Barry Allen (young)	2014–2015	1	0
Victor Garber	Martin Stein / Firestorm	2015–2017	1	0
Teddy Sears	Hunter Zolomon / Zoom	2015–2016	1	0
Hartley Sawyer	Ralph Dibny / Elongated Man	2017–2020	1	0
Paul McGillion	Earl Cox	2018–2019	1	0
Sarah Carter	Grace Gibbons / Cicada II	2019	1	0

== Awards and nominations ==
Awards and nominations received by The Flash
Award	Year (Note: Indicates the year of ceremony.)	Category	Recipient(s) and nominee(s)	Result	Ref(s)
BMI Film, TV & Visual Media Awards	2015	BMI Network Television Music Award	Blake Neely	Won	
BMI Film, TV & Visual Media Awards	2016	BMI Network Television Music Award	Blake Neely	Won	
BMI Film, TV & Visual Media Awards	2017	BMI Network Television Music Award	Blake Neely	Won	
BMI Film, TV & Visual Media Awards	2018	BMI Network Television Music Award	Nathaniel Blume and Blake Neely	Won	
BMI Film, TV & Visual Media Awards	2019	BMI Network Television Music Award	Nathaniel Blume and Blake Neely	Won	
BMI Film, TV & Visual Media Awards	2020	BMI Network Television Music Award	Nathaniel Blume and Blake Neely	Won	
Critics' Choice Super Awards	2021	Best Actor in a Superhero Series	Grant Gustin	Nominated	
Critics' Choice Super Awards	2021	Best Superhero Series	The Flash	Nominated	
Critics' Choice Super Awards	2023	Best Actor in a Superhero Series, Limited Series or Made-for-TV Movie	Grant Gustin	Nominated	
Critics' Choice Super Awards	2024	Best Superhero Series, Limited Series or Made-for-TV Movie	The Flash	Nominated	
Dragon Awards	2016	Best Science Fiction or Fantasy TV Series	The Flash	Nominated	
Guinness World Records	2020	Most in-demand superhero TV show	The Flash	Won	
Guinness World Records	2020	Most in-demand action and adventure TV show	The Flash	Won	
Hollywood Post Alliance Awards	2015	Outstanding Visual Effects – Television	Armen V. Kevorkian, Andranik Taranyan, Stefan Bredereck, Jason Shulman, and Gevork Babityan (for "Grodd Lives")	Nominated	
Hollywood Post Alliance Awards	2016	Outstanding Visual Effects – Television	Armen V. Kevorkian, Thomas J. Conners, Andranik Taranyan, Gevork Babityan, and Jason Shulman (for "Gorilla Warfare")	Nominated	
Hugo Awards	2015	Best Dramatic Presentation, Short Form	Andrew Kreisberg, Geoff Johns, Greg Berlanti, and David Nutter (for "Pilot")	Nominated	
IGN Awards	2014	Best TV Series	The Flash	Nominated	
IGN Awards	2014	Best Comic Book Adaptation TV	The Flash	Won	
IGN Awards	2014	Best TV Hero	Grant Gustin	Won	
IGN Awards	2014	Best New TV Series	The Flash	Nominated	
IGN Awards	2015	Best Comic Book TV Series	The Flash	Nominated	
IGN Awards	2015	Best TV Hero	Grant Gustin	Nominated	
IGN Awards	2015	Best TV Villain	Tom Cavanagh	Nominated	
IGN Awards	2016	Best Action Series	The Flash	Nominated	
IGN Awards	2018	Best Comic Book TV Series	The Flash	Nominated	
IGN People's Choice Awards	2014	Best TV Series	The Flash	Nominated	
IGN People's Choice Awards	2014	Best Comic Book Adaptation TV	The Flash	Nominated	
IGN People's Choice Awards	2014	Best TV Hero	Grant Gustin	Nominated	
IGN People's Choice Awards	2014	Best New TV Series	The Flash	Won	
IGN People's Choice Awards	2015	Best Comic Book TV Series	The Flash	Nominated	
IGN People's Choice Awards	2015	Best TV Hero	Grant Gustin	Won	
IGN People's Choice Awards	2015	Best TV Villain	Tom Cavanagh	Nominated	
IGN People's Choice Awards	2016	Best Action Series	The Flash	Nominated	
ICG Publicists Awards	2015	Maxwell Weinberg Award – Television	Bonanza Productions, Berlanti Productions and Warner Bros. Television	Nominated	
Kids' Choice Awards	2015	Favorite Family TV Show	The Flash	Nominated	
Kids' Choice Awards	2015	Favorite TV Actor	Grant Gustin	Nominated	
Kids' Choice Awards	2016	Favorite Family TV Show	The Flash	Nominated	
Kids' Choice Awards	2016	Favorite Male TV Star — Family Show	Grant Gustin	Nominated	
Kids' Choice Awards	2017	Favorite TV Show – Family Show	The Flash	Nominated	
Kids' Choice Awards	2018	Favorite TV Show	The Flash	Nominated	
Kids' Choice Awards	2018	Favorite TV Actor	Grant Gustin	Nominated	
Kids' Choice Awards	2019	Favorite TV Drama	The Flash	Nominated	
Kids' Choice Awards	2019	Favorite Male TV Star	Grant Gustin	Nominated	
Kids' Choice Awards	2020	Favorite Family TV Show	The Flash	Nominated	
Kids' Choice Awards	2022	Favorite Family TV Show	The Flash	Nominated	
Leo Awards	2015	Best Dramatic Series	The Flash	Nominated	
Leo Awards	2015	Best Direction in a Dramatic Series	Glen Winter (for "Going Rogue")	Nominated	
Leo Awards	2015	Best Cinematography in a Dramatic Series	C. Kim Miles (for "The Man in the Yellow Suit")	Nominated	
Leo Awards	2015	Best Visual Effects in a Dramatic Series	Armen V. Kevorkian, James Baldanzi, Keith Hamakawa, Jeremy Jozwik, and Andranik Taranyan (for "Going Rogue")	Won	
Leo Awards	2015	Best Production Design in a Dramatic Series	Tyler Bishop Harron (for "The Man in the Yellow Suit")	Nominated	
Leo Awards	2015	Best Make-Up in a Dramatic Series	Tina Louise Teoli (for "Going Rogue")	Nominated	
Leo Awards	2015	Best Hairstyling in a Dramatic Series	Sarah Koppes (for "The Man in the Yellow Suit")	Nominated	
Leo Awards	2015	Best Guest Performance by a Female in a Dramatic Series	Emily Bett Rickards (for "Going Rogue")	Nominated	
Leo Awards	2016	Best Direction in a Dramatic Series	J. J. Makaro (for "Enter Zoom")	Nominated	
Leo Awards	2016	Best Visual Effects in a Dramatic Series	Armen V. Kevorkian, James Baldanzi, Thomas James Connors, Gevork Babityan, and Marc Lougee (for "Gorilla Warfare")	Won	
Leo Awards	2016	Best Stunt Coordination in a Dramatic Series	J. J. Makaro, Jon Kralt (for "Legends Of Today")	Nominated	
Leo Awards	2017	Best Visual Effects in a Dramatic Series	Armen V. Kevorkian, James Baldanzi, Thomas Connors, Gevork Babityan, and Marc Lougee (for "King Shark")	Won	
Leo Awards	2018	Best Visual Effects in a Dramatic Series	Armen V. Kevorkian, Marc Lougee, James Baldanzi, Andranik Taranyan, and Shirak Agresta (for "I Know Who You Are")	Won	
Leo Awards	2019	Best Guest Performance by a Male in a Dramatic Series	Paul McGillion (for "True Colors")	Nominated	
Leo Awards	2019	Best Visual Effects in a Dramatic Series	Armen V. Kevorkian, Joshua Spivack, Marc Lougee, Shirak Agresta, Andranik Taranyan (for "We Are the Flash")	Won	
Leo Awards	2020	Best Visual Effects in a Dramatic Series	Armen V. Kevorkian, Josh Spivack, Andranik Taranyan, Shirak Agresta, and Marc Lougee (for "King Shark vs. Gorilla Grodd")	Won	
Leo Awards	2021	Best Visual Effects in a Dramatic Series	Armen V. Kevorkian Joshua Spivack, Shirak Agresta, Christopher Grocock, and Marc Lougee (for "Grodd Friended Me")	Won	
Leo Awards	2021	Best Stunt Coordination in a Dramatic Series	Jonathan Kralt (for "Death of the Speed Force")	Nominated	
Leo Awards	2022	Best Stunt Coordination in a Dramatic Series	Jonathan Kralt, Mike Wu (for "Heart of the Matter, Part 2")	Nominated	
MTV Movie & TV Awards	2017	Best Hero	Grant Gustin	Nominated	
MTV Movie & TV Awards	2018	Best Hero	Grant Gustin	Nominated	
People's Choice Awards	2015	Favorite New TV Drama	The Flash	Won	
People's Choice Awards	2017	Favorite Network TV Sci-Fi/Fantasy	The Flash	Nominated	
People's Choice Awards	2019	The Sci-Fi/Fantasy Show of 2019	The Flash	Nominated	
People's Choice Awards	2020	The Sci-Fi/Fantasy Show of 2020	The Flash	Nominated	
People's Choice Awards	2021	The Sci-Fi/Fantasy Show of 2021	The Flash	Nominated	
Poppy Awards	2015	Best Actor, Drama	Grant Gustin	Nominated	
Poppy Awards	2016	Best Supporting Actor, Drama	Jesse L. Martin	Nominated	
Primetime Emmy Awards	2015	Outstanding Special Visual Effects	Armen V. Kevorkian, James Baldanzi, Keith Hamakawa, Jason Shulman, Stefan Bredereck, Kurt Smith, Lorenzo Mastrobuono, Andranik Taranyan, and Gevork Babityan (for "Grodd Lives")	Nominated	
Saturn Awards	2015	Best Superhero Adaption Television Series	The Flash	Won	
Saturn Awards	2015	Breakthrough Performance	Grant Gustin	Won	
Saturn Awards	2015	Best Actor on Television	Grant Gustin	Nominated	
Saturn Awards	2015	Best Guest Star on Television	Wentworth Miller	Won	
Saturn Awards	2016	Best Superhero Adaption Television Series	The Flash	Won	
Saturn Awards	2016	Best Actor on Television	Grant Gustin	Nominated	
Saturn Awards	2016	Best Guest Star on Television	Victor Garber	Nominated	
Saturn Awards	2017	Best Superhero Adaption Television Series	The Flash	Nominated	
Saturn Awards	2017	Best Actor on Television	Grant Gustin	Nominated	
Saturn Awards	2017	Best Supporting Actress on Television	Candice Patton	Won	
Saturn Awards	2018	Best Superhero Television Series	The Flash	Won	
Saturn Awards	2018	Best Supporting Actress on Television	Candice Patton	Nominated	
Saturn Awards	2018	Best Guest Starring Role on Television	Hartley Sawyer	Nominated	
Saturn Awards	2019	Best Superhero Television Series	The Flash	Nominated	
Saturn Awards	2019	Best Actor on a Television Series	Grant Gustin	Nominated	
Saturn Awards	2019	Best Actress on a Television Series	Candice Patton	Nominated	
Saturn Awards	2021	Best Superhero Television Series	The Flash	Nominated	
Saturn Awards	2021	Best Actor on a Television Series	Grant Gustin	Nominated	
Saturn Awards	2021	Best Actress on a Television Series	Candice Patton	Nominated	
Saturn Awards	2021	Best Supporting Actress on a Television Series	Danielle Panabaker	Won	
Saturn Awards	2022	Best Science Fiction Television Series	The Flash	Nominated	
Saturn Awards	2022	Best Supporting Actress in a Network or Cable Television Series	Danielle Panabaker	Nominated	
Saturn Awards	2024	Best Superhero Television Series	The Flash	Nominated	
SFX Awards	2015	Best Actor	Grant Gustin	Nominated	
SFX Awards	2015	Best TV Show	The Flash	Nominated	
SFX Awards	2015	Best New TV Show	The Flash	Nominated	
SFX Awards	2015	Best TV Episode	"Flash vs. Arrow"	Nominated	
SFX Awards	2015	Best Villain	Tom Cavanagh as Reverse-Flash	Nominated	
TCA Awards	2015	Outstanding New Program	The Flash	Nominated	
Teen Choice Awards	2015	Choice TV Actress – Fantasy/Sci-Fi	Danielle Panabaker	Nominated	
Teen Choice Awards	2015	Choice TV – Breakout Star	Grant Gustin	Won	
Teen Choice Awards	2015	Choice TV – Breakout Star	Candice Patton	Nominated	
Teen Choice Awards	2015	Choice TV – Chemistry	Grant Gustin and Candice Patton	Nominated	
Teen Choice Awards	2015	Choice TV – Liplock	Grant Gustin and Candice Patton	Nominated	
Teen Choice Awards	2015	Choice TV – Villain	Tom Cavanagh	Nominated	
Teen Choice Awards	2016	Choice TV Actor: Fantasy/Sci-Fi	Grant Gustin	Won	
Teen Choice Awards	2016	Choice TV Actress: Fantasy/Sci-Fi	Danielle Panabaker	Nominated	
Teen Choice Awards	2016	Choice TV Show: Fantasy/Sci-Fi	The Flash	Nominated	
Teen Choice Awards	2016	Choice TV: Chemistry	Candice Patton and Grant Gustin	Nominated	
Teen Choice Awards	2016	Choice TV: Liplock	Candice Patton and Grant Gustin	Nominated	
Teen Choice Awards	2016	Choice TV: Villain	Teddy Sears	Nominated	
Teen Choice Awards	2017	Choice Action TV Actor	Grant Gustin	Won	
Teen Choice Awards	2017	Choice Action TV Actress	Candice Patton	Nominated	
Teen Choice Awards	2017	Choice Action TV Actress	Danielle Panabaker	Nominated	
Teen Choice Awards	2017	Choice Action TV Show	The Flash	Won	
Teen Choice Awards	2017	Choice TV Villain	Grant Gustin	Nominated	
Teen Choice Awards	2018	Choice Action TV Actor	Grant Gustin	Won	
Teen Choice Awards	2018	Choice Action TV Actress	Candice Patton	Nominated	
Teen Choice Awards	2018	Choice Action TV Actress	Danielle Panabaker	Nominated	
Teen Choice Awards	2018	Choice Action TV Show	The Flash	Won	
Teen Choice Awards	2018	Choice TV Ship	Grant Gustin and Candice Patton	Nominated	
Teen Choice Awards	2019	Choice Action TV Actor	Grant Gustin	Nominated	
Teen Choice Awards	2019	Choice Action TV Actress	Candice Patton	Nominated	
Teen Choice Awards	2019	Choice Action TV Actress	Danielle Panabaker	Nominated	
Teen Choice Awards	2019	Choice Action TV Show	The Flash	Nominated	
Teen Choice Awards	2019	Choice TV Villain	Sarah Carter	Nominated	
TV Guide Awards	2014	Favorite New Show	The Flash	Won	
UBCP/ACTRA Awards	2015	Best Emerging Performer	Logan Williams	Nominated	
UBCP/ACTRA Awards	2015	Best Stunt	Brent Connolly	Nominated	
UBCP/ACTRA Awards	2015	Best Stunt	David Jacox	Nominated	
UBCP/ACTRA Awards	2015	Best Stunt	Cody Laudan	Nominated	
UBCP/ACTRA Awards	2015	Best Stunt	Yusuf Ahmed	Nominated	
UBCP/ACTRA Awards	2016	Best Stunt	Leif Havdale (for "Legends of Today")	Nominated	
UBCP/ACTRA Awards	2018	Best Stunt	Jon Kralt, Trevor Addie, Chad Bellamy, Adam Chase, Mark Chin, Ken Do, Lucius Fairburn, Kevin Fortin, Kevin Haaland, Zen Humpage, Cody Laudan, Brian Lydiatt, James Mowat, Ryan Moss, Jesse Pierce, Matt Reimer, Shawn Robidoux, Chris Webb, and Mike Wu (for "Think Fast")	Nominated	
UBCP/ACTRA Awards	2019	Best Stunt	Jon Kralt and Adrian Hein (for "Legacy")	Nominated	
Visual Effects Society Awards	2015	Outstanding Visual Effects in a Visual Effects-Driven Photoreal/Live Action Broadcast Program	The Flash	Nominated	
