= Logan Williams =

Canadian actor (2003–2020)

- Born: Logan Kari Williams; 9 April 2003; Vancouver, British Columbia, Canada
- Died: 2 April 2020 (aged 16); Burnaby, British Columbia, Canada
- Occupation: Actor
- Years active: 2014‒2016

Logan Kari Williams (9 April 2003 – 2 April 2020) was a Canadian child actor, best known for playing young Barry Allen on The CW series The Flash.

== Life and career ==
Logan Kari Williams was born on 9 April 2003 in Vancouver, and raised in Coquitlam. He attended Hope Lutheran School and Terry Fox Secondary School in Port Coquitlam.

He made his acting debut in 2014, appearing in television film The Color of Rain directed by Anne Wheeler on Hallmark Channel. In the same year, he was cast in his best known role as young Barry Allen on The CW series The Flash. He made 8 appearances total from season 1 to the premiere of season 2. For his performance, he was nominated as Best Emerging Performer in the 2015 UBCP/ACTRA Awards. He acted in Hallmark series When Calls the Heart and made appearances in The Whispers and Supernatural.

Williams had been discovered using marijuana by his mother Marlyse when he was 13 and, according to her, his drug addiction progressed since. He was sent to a treatment facility in the US, and in 2019, came under care of the Ministry of Children and Family Development of British Columbia. The coroner's report later revealed that, in February 2020 during custody, he was resuscitated after an overdose and subsequently diagnosed with a "significant brain injury that affected his memory and functioning." Requesting treatment, he was then discharged from the hospital to a specialised facility with recommendations for supervision while he was documented by medical professionals to be "at high risk for serious injury or death." Marlyse met her son for the last time on 30 March.

Williams died on 2 April 2020, one week shy of his 17th birthday, in a residential care group home in Burnaby. Previous evening, he was reported missing from the residence; when he returned at 11 p.m. he "appeared agitated and under the influence of a substance." He reportedly last spoke to the staff around 4 a.m. and appeared to be asleep during hourly checks but was found unresponsive and not breathing when the staff attempted to wake him at about 9:30 a.m. The paramedics did not attempt resuscitation after they arrived as he was apparently deceased. Drug paraphernalia was located near his body. At the time of his death, according to Marylse, he was on a waiting list for treatment bed. His cause of death was later determined as accidental fentanyl overdose.

He had survived by his mother, father Clive, and grandparents. Grieving plans were initially postponed because of social distancing measures related to the COVID-19 pandemic. Following the news of his death, several of his former co-stars have shared their condolences, such as Grant Gustin, John Wesley Shipp, and Erin Krakow.

Marylse Williams has since been an advocate of opioid epidemic awareness. She has criticised the Ministry for their handling of her son's case, and in 2022, filed lawsuit against the Ministry and the Burnaby care facility, accusing them of negligence.

== Filmography ==
Year	Title	Role	Note
2014	The Color of Rain	Jack	TV film
2014‒2015	The Flash	Young Barry Allen	
2014‒2016	When Calls the Heart	Miles Montgomery	
2015	The Whispers	Young Eliot	
2015	Supernatural	Max Johnson	
