= Pilot (The Flash) =

- The Flash episode
- Promotional poster for "Pilot"
- Episode no.: Season 1 Episode 1
- Directed by: David Nutter
- Story by: Greg Berlanti; Andrew Kreisberg; Geoff Johns
- Teleplay by: Andrew Kreisberg; Geoff Johns
- Cinematography by: Glen Winter
- Editing by: Paul Karasick
- Production code: 296648
- Original air date: October 7, 2014
- Running time: 44 minutes

Guest appearances
- Michelle Harrison as Nora Allen; Chad Rook as Clyde Mardon; Patrick Sabongui as David Singh; Al Sapienza as Fred Chyre; John Wesley Shipp as Henry Allen; Stephen Amell as Oliver Queen / Arrow

Episode chronology
← Previous —	Next → "Fastest Man Alive"
- The Flash season 1

"Pilot" is the pilot and first episode of the first season of the American television series The Flash. The episode was written by Andrew Kreisberg and Geoff Johns, based on a story by Greg Berlanti, Kreisberg, and Johns, and directed by David Nutter. The series is a spin-off of Arrow; many of the characters in The Flash were introduced during its second season. Based on the DC Comics character Barry Allen / Flash, the episode revolves around Barry Allen, a forensic scientist working for the Central City Police Department. On the night that a particle accelerator launches, a malfunction causes it to explode during a storm. At the same time, Barry is struck by lightning. He wakes from a coma after nine months, and discovers that he has developed a new power: super speed.

Grant Gustin portrays Barry, and is joined by series regulars Candice Patton, Danielle Panabaker, Rick Cosnett, Carlos Valdes, Tom Cavanagh, and Jesse L. Martin. A backdoor pilot was ordered in July 2013, but The CW executives, impressed by early cuts of Gustin's appearances in the first two episodes of Arrow, ordered a stand-alone pilot instead to make use of a larger budget and help flesh out Barry's world in more detail. It was filmed in March 2014 in Vancouver, British Columbia, with additional filming in Portland, Oregon. Colleen Atwood, Arrow's costume designer, created the Flash's suit. The creative team wanted to make sure that the Flash resembled his comic book counterpart, and was not a poor imitation. In May 2014, The Flash was picked up as a series, with an initial order from The CW for 13 episodes.

The pilot was first screened at the Warner Bros. Television and DC Entertainment panel at San Diego Comic-Con in July 2014. It was first broadcast on The CW on October 7, 2014, and had a strong debut attracting 4.83 million viewers. It was the second most-watched premiere on The CW, behind the pilot episode of The Vampire Diaries broadcast in 2009, and became The CW's most-watched telecast a week after its release with a total of 6.8 million viewers. The episode received critical acclaim with praise for the tone (considered better than Arrow's), Gustin's performance as Barry, the action scenes, costume design, and the supporting cast.

== Plot ==
The episode begins with Barry Allen, a forensic crime scene investigator for the Central City Police Department, recounting his youth, in which his mother was murdered by a yellow blur in a lightning storm, and his father was wrongly imprisoned for the crime. Fourteen years later, in 2013, Barry and his best friend Iris West attend the unveiling of a particle accelerator at S.T.A.R. Labs created by Dr. Harrison Wells. Meanwhile, Iris' father, Detective Joe West, and his partner Fred Chyre use evidence Barry discovered to find Clyde and Mark Mardon. Clyde kills Fred as they escape on a plane. Meanwhile, the particle accelerator explodes, creating a storm cloud and unleashing a wave of dark matter. The Mardon brothers are presumed dead after their plane crashes, and Barry is struck by lightning.

Nine months later, Barry wakes up from a coma in S.T.A.R. Labs and meets Caitlin Snow, Cisco Ramon, and Wells, who needs a wheelchair following the explosion. Barry experiences superhuman speed and the S.T.A.R. Labs team test his abilities. Clyde later resurfaces with the ability to control the weather. Barry unsuccessfully tries to stop him, though he is able to identify him and his superhuman powers to Joe, who refuses to believe him. Barry confronts the team about the other "metahumans" created from the explosion, wanting to stop Clyde, but Wells doesn't want to risk the "treasures" within Barry's genetics. Feeling lost and hurt, Barry pays a visit to Starling City's Oliver Queen, alias "the Arrow", who encourages him to his heroic potential.

Barry returns to Central City and convinces Caitlin and Cisco to help him stop Clyde and other metahumans. To that end, Cisco gives Barry a suit that will withstand the friction created by his high-speed movements. Tracking Clyde to his old hideout, Joe and his new partner Detective Eddie Thawne, discover both his survival and his newfound powers. Barry arrives and is able to stop Clyde, who is killed by Joe. Learning about Barry's speed, Joe apologizes for not believing him, and asks him to keep this secret from Iris. With his new powers, Barry runs to help people and vows to one day exonerate his father.

In S.T.A.R. Labs, Wells enters a secret room. He rises from his wheelchair, and looks upon a holographic image of a newspaper (published on April 25, 2024) with a headline that reads "Flash Missing, Vanishes in Crisis".

== Production ==
=== Development ===
On July 30, 2013, it was announced that Arrow co-creators Greg Berlanti and Andrew Kreisberg, its pilot director David Nutter, and DC Comics CCO Geoff Johns would develop a television series based on the Flash for The CW. It would detail Barry Allen's origin. After the announcement, Kreisberg revealed that Barry would appear first as a recurring character in three episodes of Arrow season two, written by Berlanti, Kreisberg and Johns. The third appearance would serve as a backdoor pilot for the new show. Kreisberg added that Barry would be a forensic scientist, and the introduction of his superpower, and his reactions to it, would be very human and grounded.

Barry appeared in two episodes of Arrow's second season. In November 2013, the planned backdoor pilot was cancelled in favor of a traditional pilot by The CW executives impressed by early cuts of Barry's first two appearances on Arrow. The pilot allowed the creative team to flesh out Barry's story and his world with a bigger budget, as opposed to a backdoor pilot's constraint of incorporating characters from the parent show. The pilot was officially ordered on January 29, 2014, was written by Berlanti, Kreisberg, and Johns, and directed by Nutter. On May 8, 2014, The Flash was officially picked up as a series, with an initial order for 13 episodes. Three more scripts were ordered in September 2014 following a positive response to newly completed episodes by The CW executives. When developing the series' concept, Berlanti said they took inspiration from Richard Donner's Superman films, specifically the "heart and humor and scope and Americana". When comparing The Flash pilot to Arrow, Berlanti saw the latter as a nighttime crime world, and the former, where the action begins and ends during the day, as more of a sci-fi world.

=== Casting ===
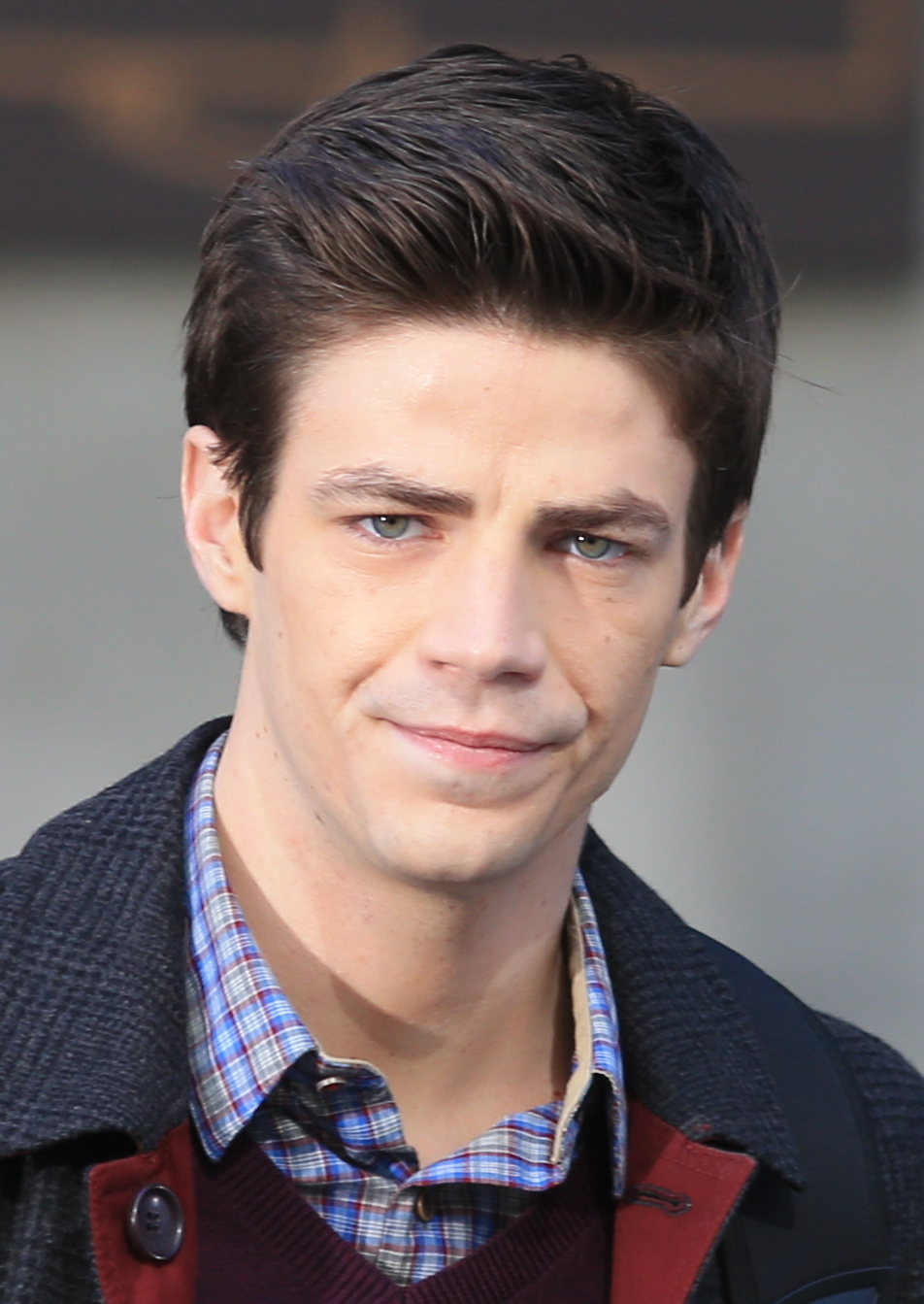
Grant Gustin, while filming the pilot in Vancouver, March 2014.

On September 13, 2013, Grant Gustin was cast as The Flash. He began researching the character during the audition process, reading as many comics as possible. Knowing it would be difficult to read everything, Gustin focused primarily on The New 52 series of comics, thinking they were closest to the show's "look and feel". On January 21, 2014, Jesse L. Martin was cast in the role of Joe West, Barry's adoptive father and police detective. Three days later, Rick Cosnett and Danielle Panabaker were cast in the roles of Detective Eddie Thawne and Caitlin Snow. Carlos Valdes was cast as Cisco Ramon on February 14. The announcement also stated that he and Panabaker would first appear in an episode of the second season of Arrow. The same day, Candice Patton was cast for the role of Iris West, Barry's love interest. Tom Cavanagh joined the cast six days later as Harrison Wells, with his role described by the network as "a rock star in the world of physics and the mind and money behind Central City's S.T.A.R. Labs Particle Accelerator". Cosnett was originally slated to portray Jay Garrick in the pilot before the character was changed to Eddie Thawne.

John Wesley Shipp, the actor who played Barry in the 1990 series, was cast the following day in an unspecified recurring role. In May 2014, his role was revealed to be that of Henry Allen, Barry's father. Berlanti stated that he was cast because "given his history with The Flash, [Kreisberg], [Johns] and I could only think of one person we wanted to play Barry's father and that was John Wesley Shipp. He gives a fantastic and emotional performance in the pilot, and we are looking forward to his presence in many more episodes."

=== Design ===
Johns stated that the show's Flash would resemble his comic book counterpart, complete with his trademark red costume, and not be a poor imitation. Kreisberg elaborated: "No sweat suits or strange code names; he will be The Flash." While researching the best way to depict the Flash's lightning speed, Johns stated it would not just be the standard "blurring around". The developers brought in costume designer Colleen Atwood, who also designed the costumes for Arrow, to create the Flash suit. It features a burgundy color scheme, a masked helmet, and gold accents throughout. It went through multiple adjustments from the moment it was created using computer rendering to the day of filming the pilot. Primarily made of leather, the suit has areas with a stretchable material to allow Gustin room to bend. According to Atwood: "It was all about a costume that could sell speed, Grant [Gustin] was continually moving in the suit, so it had to be designed to make that all happen visually and functionally."

=== Filming ===
The pilot was produced between March 2 and March 25, 2014, with filming taking place in Vancouver, British Columbia; additional filming took place in Portland, Oregon.

=== Music ===
Arrow composer Blake Neely is the series' primary composer, and was selected to score the pilot. He previously composed a theme song for Barry during his two appearances in the second season of Arrow but he noted that: "It had to be different... but it also couldn't be so different that it couldn't fit in the Arrow universe ... it had to be in a style that could hold hands with Arrow."

== Release ==
=== Broadcast ===
The pilot was first broadcast at the Warner Bros. Television and DC Entertainment panel at San Diego Comic-Con in July 2014 along with the pilot of Gotham and brief footage of Constantine. "Pilot" then aired in the United States on The CW on October 7, 2014. It was aired alongside the US broadcast in Canada on CTV, while it was first aired in the United Kingdom on Sky 1 on October 28, 2014. It premiered on Fox8 in Australia on December 3, 2014.

=== Home media ===
The episode, along with the rest of The Flash's first season, was released on Blu-ray and DVD on September 22, 2015. Bonus features include behind-the-scenes featurettes, audio commentary, deleted scenes, and a blooper reel. On October 6, 2015, the episode became available for streaming on Netflix in the United States.

== Reception ==
=== Ratings ===
The first episode of The Flash was watched by 4.8 million viewers and had a 1.9 18–49 demographic rating, making it The CW's most-watched and highest rated series premiere since The Vampire Diaries in 2009. It also became The CW's second most-watched series premiere ever, behind 90210, and the third-highest rated in the 18–49 demographic. The CW re-aired the pilot the following day on Wednesday, October 8, 2014, after the season 3 premiere of Arrow. The episode was watched by 2.11 million viewers and achieved a 0.7 adults 18–49 rating. Factoring live plus seven-day ratings, the pilot was watched by a total of 6.8 million viewers, becoming The CW's most-watched telecast ever and the highest-rated premiere among men 18–34 (2.5 rating). It broke the previous record for the most-watched telecast held by the cycle 8 finale of America's Next Top Model in 2007 (6.69 million). Additionally, across all platforms, including initiated streams on digital platforms and total unduplicated viewers on-air over two airings the week of October 7, 2014, the premiere was seen more than 13 million times.

The Canadian premiere was watched by 3.11 million viewers, making it the most-watched broadcast that night and the second for that week. In the United Kingdom, the premiere was the fourth highest-rated broadcast of the week and the eleventh of that month, with 1.53 million viewers. The timeshifted version got 82,000 viewers. The premiere in Australia was the most-watched broadcast on pay television, with 129,000 viewers tuning in.

=== Critical response ===
In addition to the strong response from viewers, the pilot received critical acclaim from reviewers. The review aggregator website Rotten Tomatoes reported a 90% approval rating for the episode, based on 21 reviews, with an average rating of 8.6/10. The website's critical consensus reads, "The Flash bounds from the starting line with a delightful beginning, given a pep in its step by the sparkling charm of star Grant Gustin."

Jesse Schedeen of IGN gave the episode a "great" 8.4 out of 10. He felt the show could stand on its own, and complimented Gustin and the cast for their "solid" acting. He also hoped that future episodes would have "more complex villains". The A.V. Club's Scott Von Doviak gave the episode a "B+" grade, noting "early indications are that The Flash is perfectly suited to the small-screen environment". Calling the pilot "this year's best new drama," Andy Behbakht of TV Overmind praised the "rich cast of characters" portrayed by "phenomenal actors". He also felt David Nutter's directing was "outstanding".

Chancellor Agard of Entertainment Weekly had a more subdued response. He felt the pilot was promising, but that the characters needed to be "fleshed out" more. He praised the pilot for embracing time travel from the Flash's mythology. In another review for the same publication, Jeff Jensen gave the episode a "B+", writing, "The series inspires more hope than fear. It vibrates with big-picture vision and has smart fun with its premise". He also praised Jesse L. Martin's performance as Barry's dad, calling it "appealingly flinty and deeply felt". Overall he believed, "With sustained energy and careful modifications, The Flash should be a long-run kick."

The Atlantic's Katie Kilkenny called the show "a welcome return to the civic hero for DC". Tim Goodman of The Hollywood Reporter noted "...if you can't smash something like the Hulk does or be a badass in the mold of Batman, you're going to need to make that 'I run fast' thing the basis of jokes and endearment rather than fear and awe". He felt the pilot had captured "precisely the right mood". The Los Angeles Times' Mary McNamara thought the show was "super-engaging" with a hero who is "both smart and loved, before and after his transformation," supporting the view that "the geek has inherited the earth".

Matt Roush of TV Guide called The Flash "one of the most enjoyable, agreeable and infectiously exuberant new shows of the fall". Roush called it "a welcome respite from the angst-heavy gloom" of shows like Arrow and Gotham. Giving the episode a "B+", Alan Sepinwall of HitFix liked its "lighter and more optimistic tone". Rob Sheffield of Rolling Stone liked that Gustin added "the right touch of hyperactive studliness". Matthew Gilbert of The Boston Globe, giving the episode a "B+", wrote: "All the potential here is in the show's resistance to the joyless atmospherics that have become the bane of comic-book shows and movies. Let's see if they can keep the broodiness at bay and come up with plots that have more than good vs. evil at stake."

=== Accolades ===
The episode was nominated for the 2015 Hugo Award for Best Dramatic Presentation (Short Form). Gustin was named TVLine's "Performer of the Week" for the week of October 6, 2014, for his performance in this episode for "[nailing] moments of whimsy, elation, heartbreak, fear and loss — all while exuding the kind of rare charisma upon which entire franchises can be built". The site particularly praised the scene when Barry puts his new powers to the test and the scene at the prison with his father, calling the latter the episode's "most powerful interlude".

== See also ==
- Pilot (Arrow) – Pilot for Green Arrow-based series, filmed in same location and with same director, and existing in the same fictional universe.
- Pilot (Smallville) – Pilot for Superman-based series, filmed in same location and with same director, but not the same universe.
- List of television series based on DC Comics publications
