= Barry Allen (Arrowverse) =

Fictional character in the Arrowverse

- Arrowverse character
- Grant Gustin as Barry Allen in The Flash
- First appearance: "The Scientist"; Arrow; December 4, 2013
- Last appearance: "A New World, Part Four"; The Flash; May 24, 2023
- Based on: Barry Allen by: Robert Kanigher; Carmine Infantino
- Adapted by: Greg Berlanti; Andrew Kreisberg; Geoff Johns
- Portrayed by: Grant Gustin; Logan Williams (young); Liam Hughes (young)
- Voiced by: Grant Gustin (Vixen); Scott Whyte (FF:TR)

In-universe information
- Full name: Bartholomew Henry Allen
- Aliases: "Flash"; "Red Streak"; "Scarlet Speedster"; "Dark Flash"; "Reverse-Flash"
- Species: Metahuman
- Occupation: Superhero; Forensic scientist of the Central City Police Department; Owner of S.T.A.R. Labs
- Affiliation: Team Flash; S.T.A.R. Labs; Central City Police Department; Paragons; Justice League
- Family: Nora Allen (mother, deceased); Henry Allen (father, deceased); Iris West-Allen (wife); Nora West-Allen (daughter); Bart West-Allen (son); Joe West (father-in-law); Wally West (brother-in-law); Jenna West (half-sister-in-law)

Bartholomew Henry "Barry" Allen, also known by his alter ego The Flash, is a fictional character in The CW's Arrowverse franchise, first introduced in the 2013 episode "The Scientist" of the television series Arrow, and later starring in The Flash. The character is based on the DC Comics character of the same name, created by Robert Kanigher and Carmine Infantino and was adapted for television in 2013 by Greg Berlanti, Andrew Kreisberg and Geoff Johns. Grant Gustin portrayed Barry Allen, with Logan Williams and Liam Hughes portraying younger versions.

In the series, Barry is 25 and portrayed as a smart, goofy and quirky character, who works at the Central City Police Department as a forensic chemist. When he was younger, he witnessed the murder of his mother by the Reverse Flash, which resulted in the false imprisonment of his father for the crime. Later in life, while working at the Central City Police Department he is struck by lightning created by the explosion of the S.T.A.R. Labs particle accelerator sending him to a nine-month coma. After waking up he finds himself in S.T.A.R. Labs and develops metahuman powers; the power of speed and he becomes friends with Cisco Ramon and Caitlin Snow. Throughout the series, he constantly trains to become the fastest speedster across the multiverse. Barry uses his powers, along with his team's help, to fight criminals and other metahumans who have misused their powers. He is a friend and frequent ally of Star City-based vigilante archer Green Arrow and Kryptonian superheroine Supergirl.

Gustin appeared as Barry Allen and his superhero persona in crossovers on the television series Arrow, Legends of Tomorrow, Supergirl, Batwoman and the animated web series Vixen, all set within the Arrowverse. The character has also appeared in a digital comic book series. Gustin received critical acclaim for his performance and won an IGN award.

== Storylines ==
=== Arrow ===
Crime-scene investigator Barry Allen was introduced in the second season of Arrow, in which he arrives in Starling City to personally investigate a superhuman-related crime. He is a fan of the Arrow's exploits and learns Oliver Queen is the vigilante; they become friends. Sometime after Barry returns to Central City, he is struck in his laboratory by lightning which was affected by dark matter from the explosion of S.T.A.R. Labs' particle accelerator.

=== The Flash ===
In The Flash, Barry finds himself with superhuman amount speed, using his powers to fight crime and hunt other metahumans in Central City as a masked superhero known as the Flash of Earth-1 with the assistance of Caitlin Snow, Cisco Ramon and Harrison Wells at S.T.A.R. Labs. When he was a child, his mother Nora Allen was murdered and his father Henry Allen was incorrectly sentenced for the crime. Barry was fostered by detective Joe West, the father of his friend and childhood crush Iris West.

In the first season, Barry awakens from a nine-month coma and eventually identified "Wells" as his mother's murderer as well as the futuristic speedster Eobard Thawne / Reverse-Flash in disguise. Eobard killed Nora after the plan to travel back in time to kill Barry as a child was foiled by the Flash of the future and left stranded in the present day. After capturing Eobard with the assistance of Oliver, Martin Stein and Ronnie Raymond, Barry is given the opportunity to rescue his mother by helping Eobard return to the future. He initially decides to go through with Eobard's offer but Barry decides not to at the last minute as he's warned by his older self not to interfere and instead returns to the present and fights with Eobard, stopping his nemesis from returning to the future. Barry is almost killed but police detective Eddie Thawne sacrifices himself to destroy Eobard.

In the second season, the Flash is recognized as Central City's hero after a singularity event occurs but the event brings the interdimensional speedster Hunter Zolomon / Zoom from a parallel earth who seeks to eliminate all speedsters throughout the multiverse. Barry discovers Eobard's confession of Nora's murder that clears Henry of all charges, and inherited Wells's fortune and resources. Though rich, Barry chooses to continue working for the Central City Police Department while using Wells's money to fund his and his allies's activities with additional assistance from Harry and Jesse Wells. After Zoom kills Henry, Barry defeats Zoom and travels back in time to save his mother's life.

In the third season, Barry alters the timeline by changing the past, resulting in the alternate timeline "Flashpoint". Though he is somewhat able to restore the timeline, this creates new threats, including the god-like speedster Savitar as well as Killer Frost who both have grudges against Barry. When he accidentally travels to the future and sees Iris killed by Savitar, Barry is desperate to change the future to prevent that from happening by working with Vibe, Wally West and Jay Garrick. He learns Savitar is a future version of himself. After saving Iris and defeating Savitar, Barry takes his place in the Speed Force in order to repent for his creation of Flashpoint.

In the fourth season, Barry is freed from by Team Flash after being stranded in the Speed Force for six months. The team later encounters an adversary with the fastest mind alive: Clifford DeVoe / The Thinker. The Thinker has orchestrated Barry's return from the Speed Force as well as the bus metas. DeVoe frames Barry for murder shortly afterwards; not wanting to risk compromising his loved ones and allies by revealing his secrets, Barry allows himself to be sentenced to life imprisonment. However, private detective Ralph Dibny uses shapeshifting power to help clear Barry of all charges. Following the Thinker's defeat, the team is approached by Nora West-Allen, Barry and Iris's daughter from the future.

In the fifth season, Nora arrives from the future, wanting to change the events that lead to Barry's disappearance in the future. However, Nora's presence has altered the timeline and unleashed the serial killer Cicada bent on killing metahumans. Furthermore, Sherloque helps the team eventually learn Eobard orchestrated Nora's arrival and Cicada. Barry and Nora succeed in subduing Eobard but are forced to let his nemesis go and Nora is erased from the timeline to avoid the Negative Speed Force's corruption.

In the sixth and seventh seasons, Barry deals with various antagonists while working with new allies Chester Runk, Allegra Garcia and Nash. Barry and Iris learn that the date of the crisis in which Barry disappears has moved up from April 2024 to December 2019, and that the Flash must die in order to save billions while dealing Ramsey Rosso as the bloodthirsty metahuman Bloodwork. Following Rosso's defeat, Barry surviving the crisis, and the multiverse's destruction and rebirth, Team Flash try to navigate the world post-crisis all while the secret organization Black Hole, and quantum engineer Eva McCulloch move forward with plans. Barry later discovers that Oliver enhancing his speed during the crisis has damaged the Speed Force which dies and all speedsters will permanently lose their speed. Barry gets the idea to create an artificial Speed Force to save his speed. Barry eventually develops an artificial Speed Force and finishes his fight with Mirror Monarch before dealing with the emergence of several new Forces, the Strength, Still and Sage forces, that were born by Barry and Iris recreating the Speed Force. Trouble soon ensues when the Speed Force goes mad and begins to threaten the city but Barry is able to tame it. Soon after, the new speedster Godspeed from the future threatens Barry but he is joined by his future children, Nora and Bart West-Allen, to take the villain down.

The eighth season sees Barry dealing with the reemergence of Eobard, the psychic alien Despero, the malevolent entity Deathstorm that feeds on people's grief, and the rise of the Negative forces via Eobard Thawne.

The ninth and final season sees Barry dealing with the speedster Red Death, the return of Ramsey Rosso and the Negative Speed Force which resurrected Eddie as the speedster Cobalt Blue.

=== Crossovers ===
In the season one episode "Worlds Finest" of Supergirl, Barry accidentally enters the universe of Kara Danvers / Supergirl and Clark Kent / Superman after passing through an extradimensional breach while testing a tachyon accelerator. He teams up with Kara in order to take down Livewire and Silver Banshee, after which Kara assists him in returning to his universe.

In the crossover "Crisis on Earth-X", Barry and Iris's friends come to Central City for their wedding, only to be interrupted when villains from Earth-X disrupt the proceedings. After defeating the invaders from Earth-X, Barry and Iris are married by John Diggle.

In the crossover "Elseworlds", Arkham Asylum doctor John Deegan rewrites reality, which results in Barry and Oliver swapping lives. In the new reality, they are the only ones that know that they are in the wrong lives and have each other's powers, which results in them going to Gotham City with Kara to confront Deegan.

In the crossover "Crisis on Infinite Earths", the Monitor recruits Barry, Oliver, Kara, Kate Kane / Batwoman, Sara Lance / White Canary, Ray Palmer / Atom, and several others from throughout the multiverse to stop the Anti-Monitor from destroying reality. Barry's fate during the crisis is altered by the intervention of Earth-90's Flash who sacrifices himself in Barry's place. Following Oliver's sacrifice and the Anti-Monitor's defeat, Barry leads a new group of heroes who agree to work together to protect their new world, dubbed Earth-Prime, in memory of Oliver.

In the season four episode "Dude, Where's My Gar?" of Titans, when Garfield "Gar" Logan / Beast Boy from Earth-9 travels the multiverse for the first time via the Red, he encounters a yellow flash zipping by. A portal opens, revealing Barry running through the Speed Force. Barry's lightning accidentally hits Gar and knocks him into Earth-2, where he briefly encounters Courtney Whitmore / Stargirl.

== Legacy ==
Possible future

In a possible future, Barry as the Flash is one of the several heroes remembered in the era called the "Age of Heroes".

Sometime before 2032, the Flash Museum was built to honor Barry and Team Flash for their heroics. The museum included exhibits for Barry's old enemies; including Reverse-Flash, Zoom, Savitar, DeVoe and Cicada. Following Barry's disappearance in a future crisis an in a now-erased future, Barry's daughter, Nora West-Allen went to the Flash Museum on a regular basis to learn about her father who was never able to raise her.

== Costume ==
Barry's suit as the Flash is altered and upgraded every season. The suit is designed by Cisco Ramon and its original design was intended as a uniform for firefighters. The suit during the first season was a modernised version of the traditional Flash suit with a matching dark maroon colored helmet, which features the same maroon emblem and gold lightning symbol as the suit does. During the second season minor changes were made to the suit, the alteration being the background color of the emblem is now white with a gold lightning symbol which is more true to the comics. Besides the alteration of the emblem in second season, there appears to only minor changes made throughout the three seasons. The suit in the fourth season appears to be a brighter red, with added leather paddings and golden accents. The fifth season made one of the most significant changes, that is the removal of the chin strap and switching the fabric softer more body fitting look, created by Ryan Choi, in the future. The suit in the sixth season is fairly similar to though now with gold piping along the torso and an entirely new cowl which features the return of the chinstrap as well as modified ear pieces designed to look more like the classic Hermes wings from the comics. The seventh season sees the Cowl to have nanotech for easier removal. The eighth season has the suit upgraded with the Golden Boots straight from the comics.

== Relationships ==
=== Iris West ===
Barry and Iris's relationship has often been compared to Superman and Lois Lane, she is introduced as his one true love. Barry and Iris were close friends since they were 9 years old, and he had stated since the start that she was his first love since he met her. However, in a twist of fate Barry's mother is murdered and Iris's father steps in as his legal guardian due to her friendship with the young boy. After growing up he confesses his feelings however because of her commitment to her first boyfriend it takes a while before they can fully admit and assume their love. It is later shown that a newspaper article is written by Iris West-Allen in 2024, thus indicating their future romance and marriage. Iris and Barry's relationship changes due to alterations of the timeline when Barry time travels, however, their love seems to always prevail and they are eventually married, Barry says in his wedding vows "That's you. You've always been there, as a friend, as a partner, as the love of my life. You're my home, Iris, and that's one thing that will never change.". At the end of season 4 they are introduced to their first born, Nora. And because of the constant changes due to time travels they discover that they will eventually have another son, Bart.

=== Linda Park ===
Barry dates Linda Park briefly in the first season, who is both friends and colleagues at the Central City Picture News with Iris West. Their relationship slowly dies out as she suspects him to still be in love with Iris, and also due to his general tardiness stemming from fighting crime as the Flash, they eventually break up and decide that they are better off as friends. In the second season, Linda is targeted by her Earth-2 doppelgänger, Doctor Light, sent by Zoom to kill the Flash, prompting Barry to reveal his identity to Linda to enlist her help in capturing Zoom, finally revealing why their relationship did not work.

=== Patty Spivot ===
Barry and Patty Spivot begin dating in the second season, she was much like Barry with her quirky personality and sad past, which has caused them to dedicate their lives and careers to avenging and seeking the truth about their parents. Patty made the decision to end the relationship because Barry was pushing her away emotionally, and she needed to attend Midway City University and study to become a CSI agent, which meant she had to leave Central City and consequently him. Before leaving she had one final case with Barry, in which she tells Barry "I know you're upset but I was hoping it wouldn't be like this between us".

== Other versions ==
=== Versions from other Earths ===
- Barry Allen of Earth-2 (also played by Gustin) is a normal human who is a CSI at the Central City Police Department and a PhD graduate, married to Iris but despised by his father-in-law.
- Barry Allen of Earth-90 is played by John Wesley Shipp.
- Ezra Miller's Barry Allen from an undesignated Earth met Earth-1 Barry in the Speed Force during "Crisis on Infinite Earths".

=== Savitar ===
Gustin also played Savitar, an evil, scarred version of the character who is a loose interpretation of the Future Flash from the Out of Time storyline. Season three features Savitar as essentially Barry embracing his dark side. Savitar's origins are a predestination paradox as he's a temporal duplicate a possible future using time travel for Savitar's defeat to which the time remnant is spared but shunned for being an aberration and goes back in time to set in motion events that led to his own creation. He named himself after the Hindu god of motion who is "chronologically" the multiverse's first metahuman with speed. Long-held myths referenced Savitar throughout the multiverse, which even Jay believed, resulted in a cult that worshipped him. From his prison in the Speed Force, Savitar manipulates Julian Albert into acquiring the Philosopher's Stone so Doctor Alchemy can re-empower metahumans from the Flashpoint timeline. Savitar manipulates Kid Flash into freeing him from his prison, and convinces Killer Frost to be his personal enforcer. Savitar reveals his true identity to Barry, forcing his original self to confront his own dark impulses and temptations. Savitar's plan of Iris's murder (which would lead to his own creation) is ruined with the sacrifice of H.R. To save himself, Savitar manipulates Vibe to fragment himself throughout all of time as well as goad his original self to give in to dark impulses. However, both efforts are foiled by Team Flash and Savitar is erased from existence after being shot by Iris. Past versions of Savitar make cameo appearances during the fifth and ninth seasons.

== In other media ==
- Fortnite Battle Royale features a skin using the Arrowverse version of Barry Allen.
- After the first screening of the DC Extended Universe (DCEU) film The Flash (2023) to the attendees of the Cinemacon 2023, director Andy Muschietti and producer Barbara Muschietti revealed that a cameo appearance of Gustin's Barry Allen was considered for the film, but was left in the "cutting floor room" due to not fitting in the story despite Muschietti's admiration for what the Arrowverse show accomplished on its own.

== Reception ==
=== Critical response ===
Regarding Gustin's debut as Barry Allen in Arrow and the potential for a series, IGN's Jesse Schedeen stated his concern: "Gustin doesn't come across as leading man material. His awkward bumbling intertwining with Felicity's was cute, but rarely did I get the impression that this character could or should be given his own spinoff series." Schedeen eventually warmed up to the character, however, once the "dorkiness and social awkwardness" were downplayed a bit and the emphasis was placed on "his keen scientific mind".

Grant Gustin as Barry Allen has received positive reviews by both fans and critics, with The Flash being the most watched show in The CW history. Since the premiere of The Flash, Gustin has been nominated for 20 awards for his role as Barry Allen and had won a total of 5 of them. In 2015, Gustin won the Teen Choice Award for "Breakout Star", in that same year he won the Saturn Award for "Breakthrough Performance" and was nominated for "Best Actor on Television". In the following year Gustin won the Teen Choice Awards for "Choice TV Actor: Sci-fi/Fantasy" and in 2017 and 2018 he took home the Teen Choice Awards for "Choice TV Actor: Action".

Gustin's Barry Allen has been said to be the better Flash, compared to Ezra Miller who starred in the Warner Bros. Justice League. According to Nick Mangione from Geek.com, "By the time Ezra Miller made his brief cameo appearance in Batman v. Superman, we had already seen the perfect Barry Allen". He goes on to say "More than heart, more than a perfect embodiment of the character from the comics, Grant Gustin is the one true Barry Allen because his show allows him to be. At least at this point, the same can't be said for Miller and the DCEU."

While the first season received largely positive reviews, the later seasons received more mixed reviews. Erik Kain, a senior contributor on Forbes, indicated that "The first season of 'The Flash' on the CW remains one of my very favourite seasons of a superhero show. I maintain that it's among the best ever made, with great characters and one of the most intriguing villains on TV." Kain, however, opined that the show has since gone downhill and that "Miller's Barry Allen is better in almost every way than Gustin's, though that's largely because he's not weighed down by CW melodrama."

=== Accolades ===
All awards and nominations are for Grant Gustin's performance as Barry Allen in The Flash:

Awards and nominations received by Grant Gustin
Award	Year	Category	Result	Ref.
Critics' Choice Super Awards	2021	Best Actor in a Superhero Series	Nominated	
Critics' Choice Super Awards	2023	Best Actor in a Superhero Series	Nominated	
IGN Awards	2014	Best TV Hero	Won	
IGN Awards	2015	Best TV Hero	Nominated	
IGN People's Choice Awards	2014	Best TV Hero	Nominated	
IGN People's Choice Awards	2015	Best TV Hero	Won	
Kids' Choice Awards	2015	Favorite TV Actor	Nominated	
Kids' Choice Awards	2016	Favorite Male TV Star — Family Show	Nominated	
Kids' Choice Awards	2018	Favorite TV Actor	Nominated	
Kids' Choice Awards	2019	Favorite Male TV Star	Nominated	
MTV Movie & TV Awards	2017	Best Hero	Nominated	
MTV Movie & TV Awards	2018	Best Hero	Nominated	
Poppy Awards	2015	Best Actor, Drama	Nominated	
Saturn Awards	2015	Breakthrough Performance	Won	
Saturn Awards	2015	Best Actor on Television	Nominated	
Saturn Awards	2016	Best Actor on Television	Nominated	
Saturn Awards	2017	Best Actor on Television	Nominated	
Saturn Awards	2019	Best Actor on a Television Series	Nominated	
Saturn Awards	2021	Best Actor on a Television Series	Nominated	
SFX Awards	2015	Best Actor	Nominated	
Teen Choice Awards	2015	Choice TV – Breakout Star	Won	
Teen Choice Awards	2015	Choice TV – Chemistry (shared with Candice Patton)	Nominated	
Teen Choice Awards	2015	Choice TV – Liplock (shared with Candice Patton)	Nominated	
Teen Choice Awards	2016	Choice TV Actor: Fantasy/Sci-Fi	Won	
Teen Choice Awards	2016	Choice TV: Chemistry (shared with Candice Patton)	Nominated	
Teen Choice Awards	2016	Choice TV: Liplock (shared with Candice Patton)	Nominated	
Teen Choice Awards	2017	Choice Action TV Actor	Won	
Teen Choice Awards	2017	Choice TV Villain	Nominated	
Teen Choice Awards	2018	Choice Action TV Actor	Won	
Teen Choice Awards	2018	Choice TV Ship (shared with Candice Patton)	Nominated	
Teen Choice Awards	2019	Choice Action TV Actor	Nominated	
