= The Flash season 1 =

The Flash
- Season 1
- Home media cover
- Showrunner: Andrew Kreisberg
- Starring: Grant Gustin; Candice Patton; Danielle Panabaker; Rick Cosnett; Carlos Valdes; Tom Cavanagh; Jesse L. Martin
- No. of episodes: 23

Release
- Original network: The CW
- Original release: October 7, 2014 – May 19, 2015

Season chronology
- Next → Season 2

The first season of the American television series The Flash premiered on The CW on October 7, 2014, and concluded on May 19, 2015, after airing 23 episodes. The series is based on the DC Comics character Barry Allen / Flash, a costumed superhero crime-fighter with the power to move at superhuman speeds. It is a spin-off from Arrow, existing in the same fictional universe, and was produced by Berlanti Productions, Warner Bros. Television, and DC Entertainment, with Andrew Kreisberg serving as showrunner.

The series follows Barry Allen, portrayed by Grant Gustin, a crime scene investigator who gains super-human speed, which he uses to fight criminals, including others who have also gained superhuman abilities. The season follows Barry getting his super speed from an accident caused by S.T.A.R. Labs who helps him fight criminals who also get powers from the same accident and helping Barry pursue his mother's killer the Reverse-Flash. Gustin is joined by main cast members Candice Patton, Danielle Panabaker, Rick Cosnett, Carlos Valdes, Tom Cavanagh, and Jesse L. Martin. The Flash was picked up for a full season by The CW in October 2014, and filming took place primarily in Vancouver, British Columbia, Canada.

The series premiere was watched by 4.8 million viewers and had a 1.9 18–49 demographic rating, making it The CW's most watched and highest rated series premiere since The Vampire Diaries in 2009. It also became The CW's second-most watched series premiere ever, behind 90210, and the third-highest rated in the 18–49 demographic. The first season finished as the 118th ranked show, with an average viewership of 4.62 million, making it the most watched series ever on The CW, and also the highest rated series among men 18–49 and men 18+ ever on the network. The first season of The Flash received generally positive reviews from critics. Reviews for the series became increasingly positive as the season progressed, with the finale receiving critical acclaim. The series was renewed for a second season on January 11, 2015.

== Episodes ==
The Flash season 1 episodes
No. overall	No. in season	Title	Directed by	Written by	Original release date	Prod. code	U.S. viewers (millions)
1	1	"Pilot"	David Nutter	Story by : Greg Berlanti & Andrew Kreisberg & Geoff Johns; Teleplay by : Andrew Kreisberg & Geoff Johns	October 7, 2014	296848	4.83
Barry Allen, a forensic crime scene assistant for Central City Police Department, is struck by lightning during a storm that is created after a particle accelerator from S.T.A.R. Labs explodes. In a coma for nine months, Barry awakens in S.T.A.R. Labs, having been placed in the care of its founder Harrison Wells and his assistants Dr. Caitlin Snow and Cisco Ramon. Barry can now move at extraordinary speeds. There were other "metahumans" created from the explosion. One of them, Clyde Mardon, is robbing banks with his ability to control the weather. To stop Mardon, Barry is outfitted with a suit, designed by Cisco, that can withstand his high speed. He tracks down Mardon and with Detective Joe West, who learns of Barry's abilities, Barry manages to stop Mardon, who is killed by Joe. With his new powers, Barry vows to exonerate his father, Henry, who is incarcerated for murdering his wife, Nora, whom Barry witnessed, at a young age, being killed by another metahuman. He chooses the alias "Flash" for his alter ego. Wells, secretly revealed to be neither paraplegic nor needing glasses, reads a newspaper from 2024 stating the missing status of the Flash.
2	2	"Fastest Man Alive"	David Nutter	Story by : Greg Berlanti & Andrew Kreisberg; Teleplay by : Andrew Kreisberg & Geoff Johns	October 14, 2014	3J5352	4.27
In flashbacks, it is revealed that Joe became Barry's legal guardian but did not let him visit Henry in prison at the latter's request. Barry begins using his abilities to stop minor crimes and help citizens across the city while starting to develop debilitating side effects. While guiding Iris West, who seeks his help to do her school assignment, Barry witnesses a robbery by a crew of men, but passes out while trying to stop them. The S.T.A.R. Labs team determines that Barry becomes hypoglycemic from the use of his abilities due to a sped-up metabolism and needs to ingest more calories to maintain his energy level. The team eventually learns that there is actually one robber, Danton Black, who has the ability to create clones of himself. Black intends to kill his former employer Simon Stagg, who stole Black's cloning research. With encouragement from Joe, Barry goes after Black and successfully stops him. However, Black commits suicide. Afterward, Barry accepts Joe's help in the investigation of Nora's murder. Later, Wells visits Stagg, who has already become obsessed with the Flash and plans to exploit him as he did to Black. Wells then kills Stagg.
3	3	"Things You Can't Outrun"	Jesse Warn	Alison Schapker & Grainne Godfree	October 21, 2014	3J5353	3.59
As the police investigate the murder of one of the city's crime families, Barry suspects that the killer may be a metahuman who can control poison gases. As Barry and Joe work to discover the killer's identity, Wells and his team work to retrofit the particle accelerator into a prison for metahumans where they can begin to find a way of reversing their mutations. This brings up difficult feelings and memories for Snow, whose fiancé, Ronnie Raymond, was killed by the explosion. The team identifies the killer as Kyle Nimbus, discovering that Nimbus does not control gases, but transforms his body into them. The team learns that Joe, the lead detective in the original case, is Nimbus' next target. Barry races to Iron Heights Prison to save Joe's life, forcing Nimbus to overexert himself so that he can apprehend him. The team locks Nimbus into a cell they have made. In a flashback to when the accelerator explodes, Wells is seen going into his hidden room and viewing a surveillance video of Barry getting struck by lightning in his lab, revealing that he knew Barry was going to become the Flash.
4	4	"Going Rogue"	Glen Winter	Geoff Johns & Kai Yu Wu	October 28, 2014	3J5354	3.53
A group of men attempt to hijack an armored truck carrying a diamond on its way to a museum. Barry stops the crime, later identifying Leonard Snart from a set of police mugshots. Felicity Smoak arrives to check on Barry, after learning that he woke from his coma. Meanwhile, Snart acquires stolen tech to help him continue without any powers. This includes a cryonic gun taken from S.T.A.R. Labs. He begins surveilling the diamond at the museum, but is seen and forced to use his cold gun to escape. Cisco had created the gun as a fail-safe against Barry should he become a villain like the other metahumans they have encountered. Felicity helps the team locate Snart, who now works on his own, when he sets a trap for Barry. Cisco, Caitlin, and Felicity arrive in time to save Barry, but Snart escapes. Wells demands Cisco not to build another fail-safe against Barry again. Barry kisses Felicity goodbye. Later, Snart meets his former partner, who has an affinity for fire, and offers him the other weapon he stole and a place by Snart's side taking back Central City from the Flash.
5	5	"Plastique"	Dermott Downs	Aaron Helbing & Todd Helbing & Brooke Eikmeier	November 11, 2014	3J5355	3.46
Bette Sans Souci, a metahuman with the ability to turn anything she touches into an explosive, appears in Central City. She is being hunted by General Wade Eiling, and is a former military explosives expert. Barry brings her to S.T.A.R. Labs where the team explains to her that she was changed by the particle accelerator, which bonded bomb shrapnel to her body on a cellular level; and they cannot reverse the process. Secretly, Wells convinces Bette to kill Eiling. Barry races to stop her, and Eiling shoots her. She attempts to warn Barry about something regarding Wells, but dies before she can do so. Her body turns into a bomb, and Barry speeds off with the body and drops it in the river to save the city from the massive explosion. Eiling visits Wells, demanding that they work together once again, this time to collect metahumans. Wells refuses and warns Eiling to never return to S.T.A.R. Labs. Meanwhile, Barry ends his friendship with Iris after she rejects his advice not to write about the "Streak". In a flashback set five years previously, Wells tells Eiling he is ending their experiments. After Eiling leaves, Wells walks to a cage and tells a gorilla named Grodd that he has plans for him.
6	6	"The Flash Is Born"	Millicent Shelton	Jaime Paglia & Chris Rafferty	November 18, 2014	3J5356	3.73
Barry speeds off to stop a car thief; but the thief's skin turns to steel and Barry breaks his hand while punching. He runs back to the lab before he can be hurt further. The thief is identified as Tony Woodward, Barry's childhood bully. Back at the lab, Cisco determines that if Barry can hit Woodward with a specific velocity at right angle, then he can create enough force to compromise Woodward's metal structure. Woodward kidnaps Iris and demands that she write about him. Barry arrives and manages to temporarily disable Woodward's abilities. Afterward, Woodward is locked away at S.T.A.R. Labs and finds out that Barry is the Flash. Barry then reconciles with Iris, subtly suggesting "The Flash" as the new name for "The Streak". Meanwhile, Joe continues investigating Nora's murder and gets suspicious of Wells, who opened S.T.A.R. Labs one month after Nora's murder. However Wells states that he came to Central City because of his wife Tess Morgan's death. Joe is later visited by the mysterious second speedster who killed Nora, who steals the case file and leaves a message threatening to kill Iris if Joe does not drop his investigation.
7	7	"Power Outage"	Larry Shaw	Alison Schapker & Grainne Godfree	November 25, 2014	3J5357	3.47
Wells returns to his secret room, where it is revealed that he has been documenting Barry's abilities, and using his artificial intelligence, Gideon, to look at events in the future. Barry arrives at a crime scene where the victim was murdered via electrocution, and charred beyond recognition, suggesting a metahuman was involved. While investigating the victim's identity, the team identifies a power drain in the city. When Barry arrives, he is attacked by Farooq Gibran, a man who has the ability to siphon electrical energy. The attack drains Barry of his speed, and Gideon reveals to Wells that there are currently no references to the Flash in the future. Wells realizes that Barry's problem is psychological. Gibran attacks S.T.A.R. Labs, kills Woodward and Wells' life gets in danger, forcing Barry to overcome his fear, connect to his speed and kill Gibran. Meanwhile, Tockman starts a hostage crisis at a police station and critically shoots Eddie; but Iris manages to stop him and he is rearrested. Later, Wells sees that the timeline is safe, and takes a sample of Gibran's blood to determine how he was able to drain Barry's abilities.
8	8	"Flash vs. Arrow"	Glen Winter	Story by : Greg Berlanti & Andrew Kreisberg; Teleplay by : Ben Sokolowski & Brooke Eikmeier	December 2, 2014	3J5358	4.34
Eddie proposes a task force to hunt down the Flash. A new metahuman, Roy Bivolo, shows up with the ability to send people into an uncontrollable rage, and uses his ability to rob a bank. Oliver Queen informs Barry that he and his team are tracking a killer who uses lethal boomerangs. (Note: Identified offscreen as Digger Harkness / Captain Boomerang.) Barry and Oliver agree to team-up and catch each other's targets. Barry decides to go after Bivolo by himself. Bivolo uses his abilities on Barry; but because of Barry's powers it makes the effects last longer. Oliver tries to stop Barry, and the two engage in a fight until Wells and Joe use colored strobe light to reset Barry's emotional state. Afterward, Barry and Oliver capture Bivolo and place him in the prison at S.T.A.R. Labs. Eddie's task force is established after he was beaten by an enraged Flash. Barry confirms Oliver's belief that he has a lot to learn. Oliver advises him to stay away from Iris, whom Barry is in love with. Iris decides to end her support of the Flash. Oliver asks Barry's team to keep his alter ego a secret. A new metahuman able to manipulate fire appears in Central City, and it is revealed to have the same face as Ronnie Raymond, Caitlin's presumed dead fiancé. Note: This episode begins a crossover event that concludes on Arrow season 3 episode 8.
9	9	"The Man in the Yellow Suit"	Ralph Hemecker	Todd Helbing & Aaron Helbing	December 9, 2014	3J5359	4.66
The yellow-suited speedster who killed Nora Allen returns, in search of Mercury Lab's tachyon particle technology. Barry encounters the "Reverse-Flash" and engages him but is swiftly defeated, with the villain insinuating that he and Barry have been lifelong enemies. Ronnie is revealed as the flame-controlling metahuman, suffering from memory-loss after having survived the explosion. Per Henry's advice, Barry confesses his love for Iris before the tachyon particle technology is used as bait to lure the Reverse-Flash into a trap. The villain manages to escape, however, and proceeds to attack Wells and the police, mysteriously sparing Eddie before engaging in Barry again. Ronnie appears and fends off the Reverse-Flash before they both flee the scene. Joe tells Eddie about metahumans and asks him to keep it a secret. Cisco realizes that there were two speedsters in Barry's house the night Nora died. Later, Wells enters his secret room and reveals the Reverse-Flash suit in a hidden chamber. Wells places the stolen tachyon device on it, and speaks in the villainous speedster's distorted voice, revealing himself to be the Reverse-Flash.
10	10	"Revenge of the Rogues"	Nick Copus	Kai Yu Wu & Geoff Johns	January 20, 2015	3J5360	3.87
As Barry works on improving his speed through various training exercises, Leonard Snart returns to Central City with the cold gun and a new partner, Mick Rory, to set a trap for the Flash. Barry discovers his plan, and agrees with Wells not to engage Snart in the hope that he goes away and no one gets hurt like the last time. Snart and Rory, who now has a gun that can emit absolute hot temperatures, kidnap Caitlin to force Barry out of hiding. Cisco and Barry find a way to defeat Snart and Rory. The Flash faces the duo in the city for a showdown, exposing himself to the public. Barry eventually gets them to cross their streams with Eddie's help, successfully damaging the weapons and disabling the pair, who are arrested and the guns delivered to S.T.A.R. Labs. While in transport to Iron Heights, Snart and Rory are broken out by Snart's sister. Meanwhile, Caitlin investigates the cause of Ronnie's transformation and finds out that the Army is covering up the incident. After Iris moves in with Eddie, Barry decides to move back in with Joe.
11	11	"The Sound and the Fury"	John F. Showalter	Alison Schapker & Brooke Eikmeier	January 27, 2015	3J5361	4.08
While home, Wells receives a threatening call from an unidentified person before using his super speed to save his life from an attempt. Wells informs Barry and the team that the caller was Hartley Rathaway, a former protégé. Rathaway begins attacking his family's business with sonic blasts, and after Barry stops him, Rathaway reveals that he knows a secret of Wells', who states that Rathaway warned him that the particle accelerator could explode, but Wells chose to risk it for the rewards. Cisco discovers that Rathaway intentionally got caught so he could steal information from S.T.A.R. Labs that would allow him to identify the frequency of Barry's molecules so he can kill him. A trap set by Rathaway starts shredding Barry's organs. Wells manages to disable Rathaway's weapons. Later, Joe has Eddie start an investigation into Wells. Rathaway, imprisoned back in the particle accelerator, reveals to Cisco that he knows where Ronnie is and how to save him. In his secret room, Wells uses the tachyon technology to temporarily recharge his Speed Force energy. Meanwhile, Iris starts working as a journalist and realizes that she is hired to write about the Flash.
12	12	"Crazy for You"	Rob Hardy	Aaron Helbing & Todd Helbing	February 3, 2015	3J5362	3.60
A woman with the ability to teleport to any location she can see breaks into Iron Heights and frees her boyfriend, Clay Parker. The S.T.A.R. Labs team identifies the woman as Shawna Baez. To help Barry, Henry tracks down leads in Iron Heights and finds out that Parker owed money to a local crime boss and is planning a heist to pay it back. Barry learns the location of the heist, finding Baez and Parker and is able to capture her after removing all the lights in a tunnel, effectively making her unable to teleport without being able to see. Parker manages to escape. Meanwhile, Cisco brings Rathaway out of his cell so that the latter can show the truth about Ronnie; Rathaway reveals that Doctor Martin Stein, who developed research into a F.I.R.E.S.T.O.R.M. project focused on transmuting elements, was at S.T.A.R. Labs the day of the explosion. Rathaway reveals that during the explosion Ronnie and Stein merged, before he escapes Cisco's custody. Barry starts dating Iris's colleague, Linda Park. Henry insinuates to Barry that he knows Barry's alter ego. Elsewhere, two city workers are attacked by Grodd.
13	13	"The Nuclear Man"	Glen Winter	Andrew Kreisberg & Katherine Walczak	February 10, 2015	3J5363	3.66
The team attempts to track Stein's whereabouts after he attacks a scientist. They convince Stein into coming back to S.T.A.R. Labs for testing. Wells discovers that Ronnie and Stein's atoms are in conflict, and if it continues they will become nuclear. Stein leaves for a secluded location to safely explode without casualties. Barry and Caitlin arrive and use a device Wells made from the tachyon to separate the bodies, but it apparently does not work, and the duo escapes the explosion, which alerts Eiling, who orders a team to recover "Firestorm". Meanwhile, Joe enlists Cisco's help to identify Nora's murderer. The duo searches the house and finds blood from two people behind some new wallpaper. Joe asks Cisco to compare the blood to Wells'. Cisco runs the blood and informs Joe that while neither is from Wells, one is from an adult Barry. In the meantime Linda believes Barry to be still in love with Iris, but he proves to Linda that he now loves her not Iris.
14	14	"Fallout"	Steve Surjik	Keto Shimizu & Ben Sokolowski	February 17, 2015	3J5364	4.01
Barry and Caitlin find Ronnie and Stein alive and separated, which Eiling also finds out. Joe reveals his findings to Barry. Ronnie and Stein realize that their minds are partially connected. Wells visits Eiling, who reveals that he knows Barry's alter ego and demands the F.I.R.E.S.T.O.R.M. project. Wells gives up Stein, who is tortured by Eiling until Barry and Ronnie save him. Ronnie and Stein reunite by the tachyon piece to survive the military onslaught. The duo gains enough control to be able to merge and separate on command. They decide to leave Central City to stay ahead of Eiling and learn more about their new powers. Meanwhile, Iris's colleague, Mason Bridge tells her his belief that Wells deliberately caused the S.T.A.R. Labs explosion. Iris suspects Caitlin's activities and decides to help Mason with his investigation. Barry tells Joe that he will travel back in time again to save Nora from the Reverse-Flash, but intends to succeed by learning the mistakes in his previous attempt. As the Reverse-Flash, Wells kidnaps Eiling and brings him to the sewers. Wells reveals himself to Eiling, and allows Grodd, who is displaying psychic abilities, to drag Eiling deeper into the sewer.
15	15	"Out of Time"	Thor Freudenthal	Todd Helbing & Aaron Helbing	March 17, 2015	3J5365	3.69
Mark Mardon, Clyde's brother, returns to Central City to avenge Clyde's death. Eddie and Linda get jealous of the intimacy between Barry and Iris. Mason shares his knowledge that Wells killed Stagg with Iris and Barry, who tells Caitlin and Cisco, who begins to believe Joe was right about Wells, so he rechecks the containment field that failed to hold the Reverse-Flash. Wells arrives and reveals himself to be Eobard Thawne, a relative of Eddie's and a man from the future who came back in time to kill Barry, and has since been stranded in the present day. Thawne also explains that he is pushing Barry to get stronger so that he can use Barry's powers to return to his time, and he murders Cisco to protect his secret. Mardon kidnaps Joe and forces him to watch as Mardon creates a tsunami in order to kill Iris. Barry reveals his secret identity to Iris, just after they admit to romantic feelings for each other, in order to save the city. Barry runs back and forth across the coastline to create a barrier against the tsunami, but he runs so fast that he travels back in time to the day before.
16	16	"Rogue Time"	John Behring	Story by : Grainne Godfree; Teleplay by : Brooke Eikmeier & Kai Yu Wu	March 24, 2015	3J5366	3.33
Wells warns Barry not to change any event for fear that he will create a bigger problem. Barry does not listen and instead captures Mardon and puts him in the particle accelerator. Snart and Rory return to Central City. Snart sends his sister, Lisa after Cisco, whom they force to rebuild the cold and heat guns, and a third gun shooting gold for Lisa, by threatening to kill Cisco's brother. Iris rejects Barry's romantic approach and later Eddie punches him. Barry realizes that Wells was right about not to manipulate the timeline. Cisco returns and reveals that Snart forced him to reveal the Flash's true identity. Barry goes after Snart, and the two come to a truce: Snart will not reveal Barry's identity, will no longer kill innocent people, and stay away from Barry's loved ones in exchange for Barry not locking him away in the particle accelerator. Caitlin tells Eddie and Iris that Barry is suffering from psychosis as a result of the lightning, making the duo reconcile with him and settling the tension. The Reverse-Flash kills Mason and destroys the evidence linking Thawne to Stagg's death. Mason's vanishing causes Barry to realize Joe was right about "Wells".
17	17	"Tricksters"	Ralph Hemecker	Andrew Kreisberg	March 31, 2015	3J5367	3.67
Barry and Joe go after terrorist Axel Walker, under the alias Trickster. Walker sets a diversion for the Flash and breaks James Jesse, the original Trickster from 20 years prior, out of prison. Jesse and Walker attempt to extort patrons of fundraiser by poisoning them and ransoming the antidote. When the Flash arrives, Jesse and Walker fit him with a bomb that will detonate if he stops moving. Thawne coaches Barry on how to vibrate his molecules so that he can phase through objects, which removes the bomb. Afterward, Barry provides an antidote to all the patrons before capturing Jesse and Walker. The Flash reveals his identity to Eddie and convinces him to keep Iris from investigating Mason's disappearance. Barry tells Eddie and Joe that "Wells" is the Reverse-Flash. In flashbacks, after failing to kill Barry, the Reverse-Flash escapes only to lose his speed. Gideon informs him that traveling through time has drained his powers. Thawne kills Harrison Wells and steals his appearance and identity so he can develop the particle accelerator sooner and return to his timeline.
18	18	"All Star Team Up"	Kevin Tancharoen	Grainne Godfree & Kai Yu Wu	April 14, 2015	3J5368	3.67
As Barry works in conjunction with Joe and Eddie to stop crimes across the city, an engineering professor is killed by a swarm of bees at a university. While the team searches for a metahuman that can control bees, Felicity arrives with Ray Palmer, looking for assistance to improve his A.T.O.M. suit. The team tracks another bee attack, but Barry is too late and is attacked by the swarm. The team captures one of the bees, which turns out to be a robot and their suspect just a scientist from Mercury Labs named Brie Larvan, who is targeting other former employees. During the next bee attack, Barry goes after Larvan while Ray attempts to stop the bees from killing Dr. Tina McGee. Felicity disables the robots, and Barry captures Larvan. Tina tells Barry that "Wells'" personality changed after his wife's demise. Iris threatens Eddie to break up if he does not share his secret. Barry informs Caitlin and Cisco about "Wells". She does not want believe it, but Cisco does, revealing that he has been having "dreams", which show his final moments with Thawne in the alternate timeline.
19	19	"Who Is Harrison Wells?"	Wendey Stanzler	Ray Utarnachitt & Cortney Norris	April 21, 2015	3J5369	3.75
Barry and Eddie track a metahuman named Hannibal Bates, who can shape-shift into anyone he touches. Bates takes Eddie's shape and frames him for murder. Later, Bates knocks Barry unconscious and assumes his form, but Thawne realizes the truth and prevents Bates from killing Caitlin and Iris. Bates manages to escape. Caitlin develops a serum to suppress Bates' power, allowing Barry to defeat him and clear Eddie's name. Iris reconciles with Eddie, who reveals his cooperation with the Flash. Bates is locked in the particle accelerator. Meanwhile, Joe and Cisco decide to investigate the car accident scene in Starling City where Wells' wife died. With the help of Captain Quentin Lance, Cisco and Joe locate a buried corpse near the crash site. Cisco also modifies a sonic device for Laurel. Joe advises Quentin to reconcile with her. After a series of tests confirm the corpse is the real Wells, Barry, Caitlin and Cisco locate Thawne's secret room at S.T.A.R. Labs. They find both the Reverse-Flash's costume and the newspaper article from 2024.
20	20	"The Trap"	Steve Shill	Alison Schapker & Brooke Eikmeier	April 28, 2015	3J5370	3.93
Barry talks to Gideon and learns about his battle with the Reverse-Flash in the future, as well as key moments in his life that include marrying Iris, a promotion at the CCPD, and the creation of Gideon. With high-tech goggles, the team reawakens Cisco's memories of his alternate-timeline death and the secrets Wells confessed. The team regroups at Joe's house, where Barry reveals his recent time travel and explains his plan to lure Thawne to confess to killing Nora. To trap Thawne, Cisco reverses the polarity of his containment field to protect himself, while Caitlin films the interaction to capture Thawne's confession. The trap fails, but Joe shoots Thawne before he can kill Cisco. As Thawne dies, his body transforms into Hannibal Bates. Thawne himself calls the team, revealing that he was always aware of their actions because he had them under surveillance. Reverse-Flash goes after Iris, but Barry arrives, forcing Thawne to kidnap Eddie instead. Iris finds out about the Flash's identity. Thawne reveals his relation to Eddie. Flashbacks reveal the aftermath of Barry being struck by lightning, and Thawne convincing Joe to let him save Barry's life, and promising to a comatose Barry that he will die.
21	21	"Grodd Lives"	Dermott Downs	Grainne Godfree & Kai Yu Wu	May 5, 2015	3J5371	3.62
While looking for Eddie and Eobard, Barry confronts a would-be thief at the gold reserve, before being disoriented by an unknown psychological attack. Back at S.T.A.R. Labs, Iris confronts Barry about being the Flash. He is able to stop the thief, who turns out to be Eiling, mind-controlled by Grodd. With a lead from Iris, Barry, Joe and Cisco head into the sewers to look for Grodd. The trio realize that Grodd is getting smarter and larger, and during an attack, Joe is kidnapped by Grodd. Cisco and Caitlin build Barry a device that will prevent Grodd's effect. The device works, but gets damaged in a fight. Barry is able to fight off Grodd's psychic attack and trick him into jumping in front of an on-coming train. Eiling is freed. Iris reveals her feelings for Barry, but states her choice to be with Eddie. Grodd is revealed to be alive and roaming the streets. Meanwhile, Thawne works on a device that will allow him to return to his own time. He reveals to Eddie, Iris and Barry's marriage in the future. Later Thawne completes the device and is revealed to be hiding in a secret chamber inside S.T.A.R. Labs.
22	22	"Rogue Air"	Doug Aarniokoski	Aaron Helbing & Todd Helbing	May 12, 2015	3J5372	3.65
Cisco discovers that Eobard has been supercharging his speed through his wheelchair, which is why he is so much faster than Barry. The particle accelerator is activated by Eobard, who has managed to repair it. The team is able to find and rescue Eddie, who ends his relationship with Iris. Worried that the metahumans imprisoned inside the particle accelerator will be killed when it reaches full power, the team plans to relocate them to Oliver's prison on Lian Yu. In order to set up a safe transport, Barry requests Leonard's help. Leonard agrees but only after Barry erases all of Leonard's criminal record. Leonard and Lisa sabotage the transport and allow the metahumans to escape, killing Jake Simmons however. Eobard arrives back at the lab just as the accelerator fully charges. Barry, Firestorm and Oliver all meet outside to fight Reverse-Flash. They coordinate their efforts; Oliver stops him with a nanite injection that disables Eobard's speed and knocks him out. Oliver leaves after informing Barry of an upcoming help request.
23	23	"Fast Enough"	Dermott Downs	Story by : Greg Berlanti & Andrew Kreisberg; Teleplay by : Gabrielle Stanton & Andrew Kreisberg	May 19, 2015	3J5373	3.87
Barry visits Thawne in the particle accelerator prison, where Thawne reveals he killed Nora because of hating the Flash, whose future self saved him. Eobard requests Barry to help create a wormhole where Thawne can return to his time, while also allowing Barry to save Nora. Caitlin and Ronnie get married. Eobard tells Cisco that the latter's ability to recall events of alternate timelines was acquired from the particle accelerator explosion. Barry decides to go through with Thawne's offer. The latter states that Barry will have only a short time, or else the wormhole will become a black hole. Barry travels back in time, but his future self signals him not to save Nora. The present Barry returns and stops Thawne from returning to his time. The two fight, while the team shuts down the wormhole. Thawne eventually prevails, but before he can kill Barry, Eddie shoots himself, causing Thawne's existence to cease. The wormhole reappears, and the team is unable to prevent it from becoming a black hole. As the black hole begins to tear the city apart, pulling Eddie inside, Barry speeds into it in an effort to stop it.

== Cast and characters ==
=== Main ===
- Grant Gustin as Barry Allen / Flash
- Candice Patton as Iris West
- Danielle Panabaker as Caitlin Snow
- Rick Cosnett as Eddie Thawne
- Carlos Valdes as Cisco Ramon
- Tom Cavanagh as Harrison Wells / Reverse-Flash (Note: Cavanagh portrays Eobard Thawne's disguise primarily and Harrison Wells (Earth-1) in a less prominent capacity.)
- Jesse L. Martin as Joe West

=== Recurring ===
- Robbie Amell as Ronnie Raymond / Firestorm
- Clancy Brown as General Wade Eiling
- Victor Garber as Martin Stein / Firestorm
- Michelle Harrison as Nora Allen
- Roger Howarth as Mason Bridge
- Malese Jow as Linda Park
- Wentworth Miller as Leonard Snart / Captain Cold
- Patrick Sabongui as David Singh
- John Wesley Shipp as Henry Allen

=== Guest ===
- Chad Rook as Clyde Mardon
- Stephen Amell as Oliver Queen / Arrow
- Michael Christopher Smith as Danton Black / Multiplex
- William Sadler as Simon Stagg
- Anthony Carrigan as Kyle Nimbus / Mist
- Emily Bett Rickards as Felicity Smoak
- Greg Finley as Tony Woodward / Girder
- Kelly Frye as Bette Sans Souci / Plastique
- Nicholas Gonzalez as Dante Ramon
- Michael Reventar as Farooq Gibran / Blackout
- Morena Baccarin as the voice of Gideon
- Robert Knepper as William Tockman / Clock King
- Paul Anthony as Roy Bivolo / Rainbow Raider
- Anna Hopkins as Samantha Clayton
- David Ramsey as John Diggle / Spartan
- Amanda Pays as Tina McGee
- Luc Roderique as Jason Rusch
- Dominic Purcell as Mick Rory / Heat Wave
- Andy Mientus as Hartley Rathaway / Pied Piper
- Britne Oldford as Shawna Baez / Peek-a-Boo
- Isabella Hofmann as Clarissa Stein
- David Sobolov as the voice of Grodd
- Liam McIntyre as Mark Mardon / Weather Wizard
- Peyton List as Lisa Snart / Golden Glider
- Bre Blair as Tess Morgan
- Devon Graye as Axel Walker / Trickster
- Mark Hamill as James Jesse / Trickster
- Matt Letscher as Eobard Thawne
- Vito D'Ambrosio as Mayor Anthony Bellows
- Brandon Routh as Ray Palmer / Atom
- Emily Kinney as Brie Larvan / Bug-Eyed Bandit
- Martin Novotny as Hannibal Bates / Everyman
- Katie Cassidy as Laurel Lance / Black Canary
- Paul Blackthorne as Quentin Lance
- Doug Jones as Jake Simmons / Deathbolt
- Ciara Renée as Kendra Saunders

== Production ==
=== Development ===
On July 30, 2013, it was announced that Arrow co-creators Greg Berlanti and Andrew Kreisberg, Arrow pilot director David Nutter, and DC Comics CCO Geoff Johns would develop a television series based on the Flash for The CW, and it would detail Barry Allen's origin. Kreisberg revealed after the announcement that Allen would first appear as a recurring character on Arrow in three episodes of season two—all written by Berlanti, Kreisberg and Johns—and the last of the episodes would act as a backdoor pilot for the new show. Kreisberg added that Allen would be a forensic scientist and the introduction of his superpowers, as well as the reactions to this, will be very human and grounded. Johns stated that the character of the Flash in the show would resemble his comic book counterpart, complete with his trademark red costume, and not be a poor imitation. Kreisberg elaborated: "No sweat suits or strange code names; he will be The Flash." While researching the best way to depict the Flash's lightning speed, Johns stated it would not just be the standard "blurring around".

Barry ultimately appeared twice in Arrow's second season, with the planned backdoor pilot canceled in favor of a traditional pilot by The CW executives, who had been impressed by early cuts of Barry's first two episodes on Arrow. This allowed the creative team to flesh out Barry's story and his world on a bigger budget, as opposed to a backdoor pilot's constraint of incorporating characters from the parent show. The pilot was officially ordered on January 29, 2014, and was written by Berlanti, Kreisberg, and Johns, and directed by Nutter. On May 8, 2014, The Flash was officially picked up as a series, with an initial order of 13 episodes. Three more scripts were ordered in September 2014 following a positive response to newly completed episodes by executives, while a back ten was ordered on October 21, 2014, for a full 23-episode season.

In July 2014, Johns described the series as "the most faithful DC Comics adaptation ever... We've incorporated almost everything of the mythology into it and added a new backstory with S.T.A.R. Labs." In October 2014, Johns explained that DC's approach to their films and television series would be different from Marvel Studios' cinematic universe, stating that their film universe and TV universes would be kept separate within a multiverse to allow "everyone to make the best possible product, to tell the best story, to do the best world."

=== Casting ===
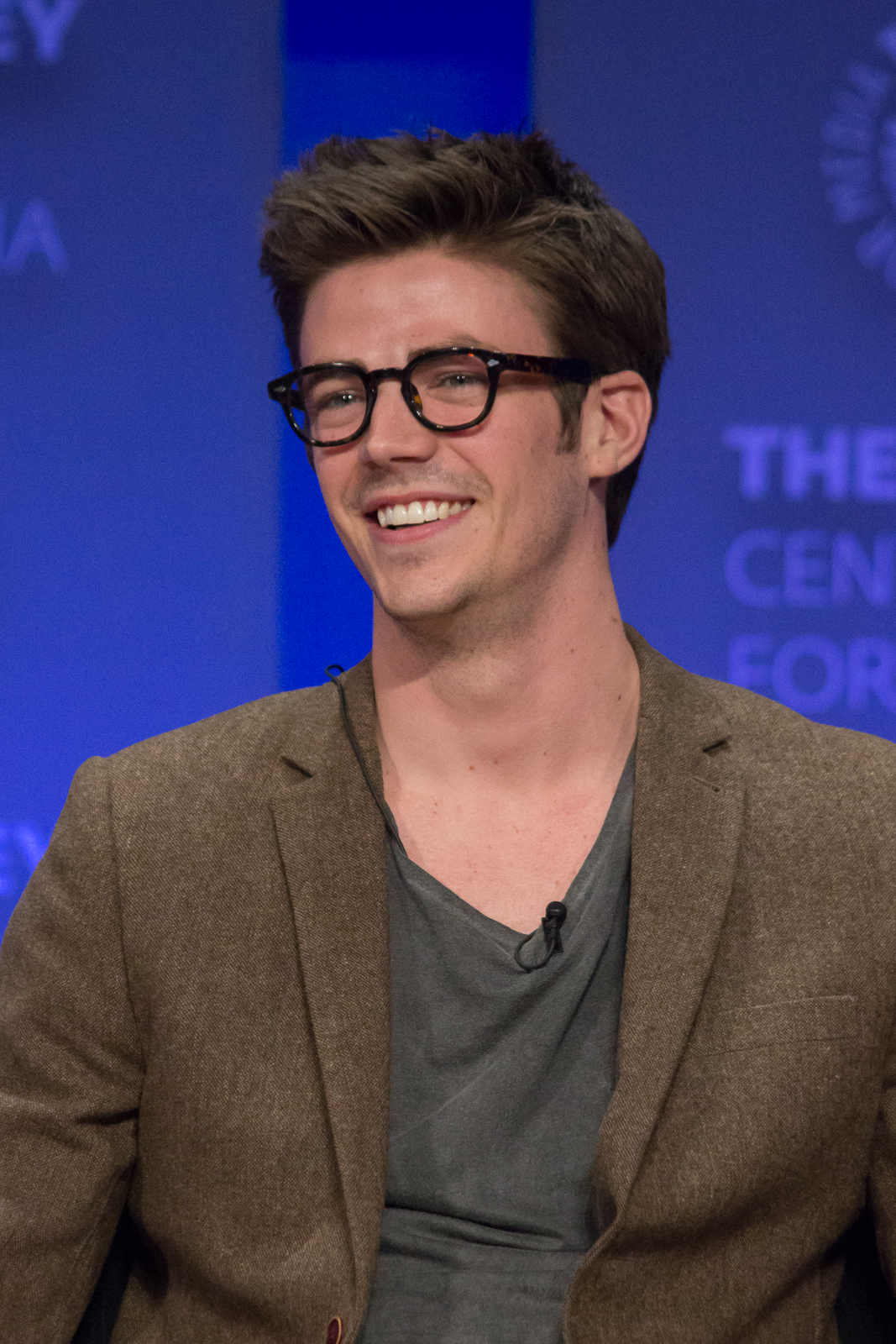
Grant Gustin stars as Barry Allen / Flash

On September 13, 2013, Grant Gustin was cast in the titular role of Barry Allen / Flash. Andy Mientus, who would eventually be cast as Hartley Rathaway, also auditioned for the role. Gustin began researching the character during the audition process, and reading as many comics as possible. Gustin primarily focused on The New 52 series of comics, because he knew it would be difficult to read everything and he felt the New 52 was the closest to the show's "look and feel". In January 2014, actor Jesse L. Martin was cast as Detective Joe West, while Rick Cosnett was cast as Eddie Thawne and Danielle Panabaker as Caitlin Snow. In February 2014, Candice Patton was cast as Iris West and Carlos Valdes as Cisco Ramon. Patton's casting as Iris caused significant backlash among comic book fans due to Patton being of African descent, while Iris has typically been depicted as a Caucasian woman in comics. Though the writers discussed early on to make Barry and Caitlin lovers, Gustin vetoed this idea in favour of Barry and Iris, as in the comics. Also in February 2014, The Hollywood Reporter reported that the remaining regular roles to be cast were for the parts of Harrison Wells and Hartley Rathaway. On February 10, 2014, Tom Cavanagh was cast as Harrison Wells, with his role described as "a rock star in the world of physics and the mind and money behind Central City's S.T.A.R. Labs Particle Accelerator". It was eventually revealed that Cavanagh's character was actually Eobard Thawne, who stole the appearance of the real Wells (also portrayed by Cavanagh) after killing him, with Matt Letscher portraying Thawne's original likeness. Letscher was cast due to his previous collaboration with Kreisberg and Berlanti in the ABC television series Eli Stone.

Several cast members from the 1990 television series appear in the series. John Wesley Shipp, who portrayed Barry Allen/Flash in the 1990 series, joined the cast in a recurring role as Barry's father, Dr. Henry Allen, and Amanda Pays once again portrays a character named Dr. Tina McGee. In the episode "Tricksters", Mark Hamill returns as James Jesse / Trickster and Vito D'Ambrosio plays Mayor Anthony Bellows (a character he played in 1991, but as a police officer), with images of Hamill as Trickster from the 1990 TV series being used in a police report.

=== Design ===
The Flash costume was designed by Colleen Atwood. While remaining largely faithful to Barry's costume from the comics, it was designed as a more "functional, textured quality" costume than previous live-action Flash ones.

=== Filming ===
Production on the pilot began in March 2014, with filming taking place in Vancouver, British Columbia; additional filming for the series takes place in Portland, Oregon. On how action sequences are shot for the series, compared to Arrow, Gustin said, "When [Arrow] shoot(s) action sequences, pretty much what you see is what you get and they're really doing everything. We do a lot of plate shots that are empty shots of the area we're going to be in and then they're putting us in later in post. I do a lot of the fighting. I don't have to do it full speed and then they ramp it up and a lot of people have to freeze and I keep moving. Then I have to clear frame and step back into frame. It's really tedious stuff that we have to do. On theirs, they learn fight choreography and they shoot it from the perfect angles and what you see is what you get."

Filming for the rest of the season began on July 11, 2014, and, ended on April 14, 2015.

=== Music ===
Arrow composer Blake Neely is the primary composer of the series, and was first hired in April 2014 to score the pilot. He had previously composed a theme for Barry Allen which was featured in Arrow's season two episodes "The Scientist" and "Three Ghosts". The theme was titled "The Scientist" when it was released on the Arrow: Season 2 soundtrack. According to Neely, "It had to be different [from Arrow] ... but it also couldn't be so different that it couldn't fit in the Arrow universe, ... it had to be in a style that could hold hands with Arrow." On December 18, 2014, WaterTower Music released a selection of music from The Flash/Arrow crossover episodes, as well as two bonus tracks from their respective 2014 midseason finales. The first season, two-disc soundtrack was released on October 16, 2015, by La La Land Records.

All music composed by Blake Neely.

Disc 1
No.	Title	Length
1.	"The Fastest Man Alive / Always Late"	3:05
2.	"Best Friends Since Childhood"	2:37
3.	"Metahumans"	2:35
4.	"Dr. Wells Has Secrets"	3:03
5.	"I Have to Try"	4:56
6.	"Proud of You"	2:23
7.	"A Lot Happened That Night"	2:28
8.	"Mad Skills"	1:18
9.	"Eddie and Iris"	1:21
10.	"Birth of The Flash"	3:06
11.	"Things You Can't Outrun"	2:25
12.	"Captain Cold"	1:41
13.	"We Were All Struck by That Lightning"	1:15
14.	"Going Rogue"	2:03
15.	"No Time"	2:23
16.	"Grodd Lives"	1:36
17.	"Impossible Thing"	3:05
18.	"Supersonic"	2:03
19.	"Catch Me If You Can"	2:33
20.	"Martin Stein and Firestorm"	3:22
21.	"Fate of My Dad"	2:08
22.	"The Nuclear Man"	3:16
23.	"Dead to Me"	3:20
24.	"Reveal to Iris / Running Back in Time"	3:13
25.	"He's a Hero"	2:35
26.	"Tricksters"	2:52
27.	"Called Some Friends for Help"	4:15
28.	"Second Chance"	3:04
29.	"Closing the Wormhole"	4:43
Total length:		1:18:13

Disc 2
No.	Title	Length
1.	"Saga Sell"	0:36
2.	"Rainbow Raider Strikes"	2:24
3.	"What I Can See"	0:43
4.	"Forming a Task Force"	1:27
5.	"Don't Get Involved"	0:41
6.	"Team Arrow in Central City"	2:32
7.	"Give You a Lift"	0:58
8.	"Training Barry"	2:24
9.	"What's Up, Doc?"	2:21
10.	"Barry Gets Whammied"	3:05
11.	"Flash Taunts Eddie"	1:03
12.	"The Flash vs. Arrow"	5:06
13.	"S.T.A.R. Labs Thanks Oliver"	1:52
14.	"A Girl Oliver Once Knew"	1:08
15.	"Firestorm Appears"	0:52
16.	"The Man in the Yellow Suit"	2:15
17.	"What You Can Do"	1:20
18.	"Use of Powers"	1:58
19.	"Saving Innocent People"	3:01
20.	"What Barry Saw"	2:26
21.	"Eobard Desiccates Wells"	1:53
22.	"I Love You, Iris"	1:34
23.	"Cold Wants to Know His Name"	1:22
24.	"Lucid Dreaming"	2:59
25.	"Grodd Mind Control"	1:41
26.	"Taken Enough"	2:16
27.	"Luring the Admission From Wells"	3:21
28.	"Eobard Confesses"	1:44
29.	"Super Collider"	3:29
30.	"A New Name"	1:01
Total length:		59:12

=== Arrowverse tie-ins ===
In March 2014, it was announced that Gustin would not appear in a third episode of Arrow as originally planned. However, Panabaker and Valdes appear in the Arrow episode "The Man Under the Hood" in their roles as Caitlin Snow and Cisco Ramon, respectively. Arrow executive producer Marc Guggenheim stated, "This was something that really came about because obviously Barry is in a coma at the end of ["Three Ghosts"]. That pretty much made it impossible for Barry to appear in [the third episode, as originally planned]... The idea of bringing in [Caitlin Snow and Cisco Ramon] really, really appealed to us because it allowed us to honor our original intention [of] doing something Flash-related around episode 19 or 20 [of season two] without having comatose Barry and basically paying Grant Gustin a lot of money to sit around with his eyes closed just unconscious the whole episode... It allows us to further flesh out the Flash universe in Arrow." Gustin had a brief cameo appearance in the Arrow season three premiere, "The Calm". Valdes appeared once again in the season three episode "Broken Arrow", while Gustin appeared in the final episode of season three, "My Name is Oliver Queen". Stephen Amell appears as Oliver Queen / Arrow in the pilot episode. Kreisberg announced that Emily Bett Rickards would appear in the fourth episode as Felicity. Previous Arrow adversary William Tockman / The Clock King (Robert Knepper) was in the seventh episode. Members of The Royal Flush Gang, who previously appeared on Arrow, made a cameo appearance in the eleventh episode of the series. Rickards and Brandon Routh as Ray Palmer had scenes in the eighteenth episode, "All Star Team Up". Katie Cassidy and Paul Blackthorne, as Laurel Lance / Black Canary and Detective Quentin Lance, respectively, appeared in the following episode, "Who Is Harrison Wells?", while Amell and Doug Jones as Jake Simmons / Deathbolt appeared in the twenty-second episode, "Rogue Air".

==== "Flash vs. Arrow" ====
On July 18, 2014, Kreisberg stated that a crossover event would occur in the eighth episode of the first season of The Flash and the third season of Arrow, respectively. In early January 2015, The CW president Mark Pedowitz announced the intention to do a Flash/Arrow crossover every season, after the success of the first one.

== Marketing ==
In April 2015, to celebrate the season three finale of Arrow and season one finale of The Flash, The CW released a short promo titled "Superhero Fight Club". The short features characters from Arrow and The Flash battling each other in a hero vs. villain showdown. Characters include Arrow, Flash, Arsenal, Black Canary, Merlyn, Captain Cold, Heat Wave, Firestorm, Ra's al Ghul, Reverse-Flash, and the A.T.O.M. in a cage match fight.

== Release ==
=== Broadcast ===
The Flash was screened at the Warner Bros. Television and DC Entertainment panel at San Diego Comic-Con in July 2014. The series officially premiered on The CW on October 7, 2014, during the 2014–15 television season and also premiered in Canada on the same night. The second episode was screened at New York Comic Con on October 9, 2014, as a way to repay the viewers that watched the series' premiere episode. The series premiered in the United Kingdom and Ireland on October 28, 2014, and in Australia on December 3, 2014.

=== Home media ===
The season began streaming on Netflix on October 6, 2015, and was released on Blu-ray and DVD in Region 1 on September 22, 2015.

Home media releases of The Flash season 1
The Flash: The Complete First Season
Set details	Special features	
23 episodes; 5-disc DVD set/4-disc Blu-ray set; English (Dolby Digital 5.1 Surround); English SDH, Spanish and French subtitles; Subtitles: English	DC Comics Night at Comic-Con 2014; Deleted Scenes; Gag Reel; Audio Commentary; Featurettes; The Fastest Man Alive!; Creating the Blur; The Chemistry of Emily and Grant Screen Test; Behind the Story: The Trickster Returns!	
DVD release dates
Region 1	Region 2	Region 4
September 22, 2015	September 21, 2015	September 23, 2015
Blu-ray release dates
Region A		Region B
September 22, 2015		September 21, 2015

=== Copyright infringement ===
The first season of The Flash was the fifth most-pirated TV series in 2015.

== Reception ==
=== Ratings ===
Viewership and ratings per episode of The Flash season 1
No.	Title	Air date	Rating/share (18–49)	Viewers (millions)	DVR (18–49)	DVR viewers (millions)	Total (18–49)	Total viewers (millions)
1	"Pilot"	October 7, 2014	1.9/6	4.83	0.7	2.00	2.6	6.83
2	"Fastest Man Alive"	October 14, 2014	1.7/5	4.27	—N/a	—N/a	—N/a	—N/a
3	"Things You Can't Outrun"	October 21, 2014	1.5/4	3.59	0.5	1.63	2.0	5.22^{1}
4	"Going Rogue"	October 28, 2014	1.4/4	3.53	0.9	—N/a	2.3	—N/a
5	"Plastique"	November 11, 2014	1.4/4	3.46	1.0	—N/a	2.4	—N/a
6	"The Flash Is Born"	November 18, 2014	1.4/4	3.73	0.9	—N/a	2.3	—N/a
7	"Power Outage"	November 25, 2014	1.4/4	3.47	0.9	2.41	2.3	5.88
8	"Flash vs. Arrow"	December 2, 2014	1.6/5	4.34	1.0	2.31	2.6	6.65
9	"The Man in the Yellow Suit"	December 9, 2014	1.5/5	4.66	0.9	2.06	2.4	6.72
10	"Revenge of the Rogues"	January 20, 2015	1.4/5	3.87	1.0	2.41	2.4	6.27
11	"The Sound and the Fury"	January 27, 2015	1.3/4	4.08	1.0	2.20	2.3	6.28
12	"Crazy for You"	February 3, 2015	1.3/4	3.60	0.9	—N/a	2.2	—N/a
13	"The Nuclear Man"	February 10, 2015	1.5/5	3.66	0.6	1.39	2.1	5.05^{1}
14	"Fallout"	February 17, 2015	1.5/4	4.01	0.9	—N/a	2.4	—N/a
15	"Out of Time"	March 17, 2015	1.3/5	3.69	1.0	2.34	2.3	6.09
16	"Rogue Time"	March 24, 2015	1.2/4	3.33	1.0	2.37	2.2	5.69
17	"Tricksters"	March 31, 2015	1.3/4	3.67	1.0	2.43	2.3	6.10
18	"All Star Team Up"	April 14, 2015	1.4/5	3.67	0.9	2.05	2.3	5.72
19	"Who Is Harrison Wells?"	April 21, 2015	1.3/4	3.75	0.9	—N/a	2.2	—N/a
20	"The Trap"	April 28, 2015	1.5/5	3.93	0.9	—N/a	2.4	—N/a
21	"Grodd Lives"	May 5, 2015	1.5/5	3.62	0.9	2.27	2.4	5.97
22	"Rogue Air"	May 12, 2015	1.5/5	3.65	0.9	—N/a	2.4	—N/a
23	"Fast Enough"	May 19, 2015	1.5/5	3.87	1.0	2.38	2.5	6.25

^1 Live +7 ratings were not available, so Live +3 ratings have been used instead.

The first episode of The Flash was watched by 4.8 million viewers and had a 1.9 18–49 demographic rating, making it The CW's most watched and highest rated series premiere since The Vampire Diaries in 2009. It also became The CW's second-most watched series premiere ever, behind 90210, and the third-highest rated in the 18–49 demographic. Factoring Live + 7 day ratings, the pilot was watched by a total of 6.8 million viewers, becoming The CW's most-watched telecast and the highest-rated premiere among men 18–34 (2.5 rating). It broke the previous record for the most-watched telecast held by the cycle 8 finale of America's Next Top Model in 2007 (6.69 million). Additionally, across all platforms, including initiated streams on digital platforms and total unduplicated viewers on-air over two airings the week of October 7, 2014, the premiere was seen more than 13 million times.

The Canadian premiere was watched by 3.11 million viewers, making it the most-watched broadcast that night and the second for that week. In the United Kingdom, the premiere was the fourth highest-rated broadcast of the week and the eleventh of that month, with 1.53 million viewers. The timeshifted version got 82,000 viewers. The premiere in Australia was the most-watched broadcast on pay television, with 129,000 viewers tuning in.

The first season finished as the 118th ranked show, with an average viewership of 4.62 million, helping to deliver The CW's most watched season in seven years. The Flash finished the season as the most watched series ever on The CW with 5.85 million viewers, and also the highest rated series among men 18–49 (2.8 rating) and men 18+ ever on the network.

=== Critical response ===
Season 1 of The Flash received generally positive reviews from critics. The review aggregator website Rotten Tomatoes reported a 92% approval rating with an average rating of 7.75/10 based on 530 reviews. The website's consensus reads, "The Flash benefits from its purposefully light atmosphere, making it a superhero show uniquely geared toward genre fans as well as novices." Metacritic, which uses a weighted average, assigned a score of 73 out of 100, based on 27 reviews, indicating "generally favorable" reviews.

IGN's Eric Goldman and Joshua Yehl praised the show's premise and cast after viewing a press screening copy of the pilot. Goldman and Yehl favorably compared it to Arrow, stating that The Flash progresses with a confidence that Arrow did not get until later in the series. Reviews for the series became increasingly positive as the season progressed, with the finale receiving critical acclaim.

Noel Murray of The A.V. Club gave the season a B+ overall, giving praise to the pacing of the plot, the performances of the cast and the special effects, and also pointing out the series' boldness to embrace its comic book influences, something that conventional superhero shows tend not to do. Weekly episode reviewer Scott Von Doviak gave consistently high ratings to the season and awarded the season finale a perfect A grade, calling the episode "richly satisfying" and also commending the show for "[capturing] the essence of its source material in a fun, light-on-its-feet way that few other comic book adaptations have managed." He also gave high praise to the emotional value and performances of the cast, as well as the cliffhanger and multiple easter eggs found in the episode.

=== Accolades ===
The Flash was included on multiple Best/Top TV Shows of 2014 lists, ranking on NPR and Omaha World-Herald's (7th), and Film School Rejects' (10th). In its first season, The Flash was nominated for 35 awards, including an Emmy nomination for Outstanding Special Visual Effects for the episode "Grodd Lives", and winning nine. The show was nominated for four Saturn Awards, winning Best Superhero Adaption Television Series and Wentworth Miller winning for Best Guest Star on Television. Gustin was honored with the Breakthrough Performance Saturn Award at the ceremony for his electrifying performance as Barry Allen/The Flash. The series received eight Leo Awards nominations, including Best Dramatic Series and winning Best Visual Effects in a Dramatic Series for the episode "Going Rogue". It also won the People's Choice Award for "Favorite New TV Drama" for the 2014–15 season. The Atlantic named the season finale, "Fast Enough" one of the best television episodes of 2015.

Awards and nominations for The Flash season 1
Year	Award	Category	Nominee(s)	Result	Ref.
2014	Visual Effects Society Awards	Outstanding Visual Effects in a Visual Effects-Driven Photoreal/Live Action Broadcast Program	Armen V. Kevorkian, James Baldanzi, Jeremy Jozwick, Andranik Taranyan	Nominated	
2014	TV Guide Award	Favorite New Show	The Flash	Won	
2015	People's Choice Awards	Favorite New TV Drama	The Flash	Won	
2015	Kids' Choice Awards	Favorite Family TV Show	The Flash	Nominated	
2015	Kids' Choice Awards	Favorite TV Actor	Grant Gustin	Nominated	
2015	Saturn Awards	Best Superhero Adaption Television Series	The Flash	Won	
2015	Saturn Awards	Breakthrough Performance	Grant Gustin	Won	
2015	Saturn Awards	Best Actor on Television	Grant Gustin	Nominated	
2015	Saturn Awards	Best Guest Star on Television	Wentworth Miller	Won	
2015	Leo Awards	Best Dramatic Series	The Flash	Nominated	
2015	Leo Awards	Best Direction in a Dramatic Series	Glen Winter	Nominated	
2015	Leo Awards	Best Cinematography in a Dramatic Series	C. Kim Miles	Nominated	
2015	Leo Awards	Best Visual Effects in a Dramatic Series	For episode "Going Rogue"	Won	
2015	Leo Awards	Best Production Design in a Dramatic Series	Tyler Bishop Harron	Nominated	
2015	Leo Awards	Best Make-Up in a Dramatic Series	Tina Louise Teoli	Nominated	
2015	Leo Awards	Best Hairstyling in a Dramatic Series	Sarah Koppes	Nominated	
2015	Leo Awards	Best Guest Performance by a Female in a Dramatic Series	Emily Bett Rickards	Nominated	
2015	Publicists Awards	Maxwell Weinberg Award – Television	Bonanza Productions, Berlanti Productions and Warner Bros. Television	Nominated	
2015	TCA Awards	Outstanding New Program	The Flash	Nominated	
2015	Teen Choice Awards	Choice TV Actress: Fantasy/Sci-Fi	Danielle Panabaker	Nominated	
2015	Teen Choice Awards	Choice TV: Breakout Star	Grant Gustin	Won	
2015	Teen Choice Awards	Choice TV: Breakout Star	Candice Patton	Nominated	
2015	Teen Choice Awards	Choice TV: Chemistry	Grant Gustin and Candice Patton	Nominated	
2015	Teen Choice Awards	Choice TV: Liplock	Grant Gustin and Candice Patton	Nominated	
2015	Teen Choice Awards	Choice TV: Villain	Tom Cavanagh	Nominated	
2015	Hugo Awards	Best Dramatic Presentation – Short Form	For the episode "Pilot"	Nominated	
2015	Primetime Emmy Award	Outstanding Special Visual Effects	For episode "Grodd Lives"	Nominated	
2015	IGN Awards	Best TV Series	The Flash	Nominated	
2015	IGN Awards	Best Comic Book Adaptation TV	The Flash	Won	
2015	Poppy Awards	Best Actor, Drama	Grant Gustin	Nominated	
