= Joe West (Arrowverse) =

Fictional character from the television series The Flash

- Arrowverse character
- Jesse L. Martin as Joe West
- First appearance: "Pilot"; The Flash; October 7, 2014
- Last appearance: "A New World, Part Four"; The Flash; May 24, 2023
- Created by: Geoff Johns; Greg Berlanti; Andrew Kreisberg
- Portrayed by: Jesse L. Martin

In-universe information
- Full name: Joseph West
- Affiliation: Team Flash
- Spouse: Francine West (deceased)
- Significant other: Cecile Horton
- Children: Iris West (daughter); Wally West (son); Barry Allen (son-in-law); Jenna West (daughter)
- Nationality: American

Joseph West is a fictional character portrayed by Jesse L. Martin in The CW's Arrowverse franchise. Created by Geoff Johns, Greg Berlanti and Andrew Kreisberg, the character was introduced in the pilot episode of The Flash. He is the legal guardian (later father-in-law) of protagonist Barry Allen / Flash and the father of Iris West, Wally West, and Jenna West. Joe works at the Central City Police Department initially as a detective, heading its metahuman task force, and later as the captain, aiding Barry in keeping Central City safe from superpowered and dangerous criminals. Martin has received positive reviews for his performance as Joe.

== Fictional character biography ==
In season one, Central City Police Department (CCPD) detective Joe West becomes the legal guardian to his neighbor Barry Allen after Barry's mother Nora was murdered and his father Henry convicted. Joe remains convinced Henry killed Nora, despite Barry's insistence of witnessing mysterious speedsters fighting that night and pursuit of other claims of metahuman activities to establish Henry's innocence. Several year later, Joe realizes that Barry may have been right after the S.T.A.R. Labs' particle accelerator explodes and transforms Barry and other Central City individuals into metahumans. He aids in Barry's crime-fighting efforts as the costumed speedster known as the Flash and agrees to help exonerate Henry. Joe becomes one of the few who knows Barry's secret early on, alongside Caitlin Snow and Cisco Ramon, and he tells Barry to not reveal this secret for his daughter Iris's safety. Joe is aware that Iris and his partner Eddie Thawne have been dating, and although initially a bit upset, ultimately gives them his blessing. Joe secretly investigates S.T.A.R. Labs' director Harrison Wells. He, Barry, Caitlin and Cisco ultimately discover "Wells" is actually Eobard Thawne, Nora's killer. Joe is powerless when Eddie sacrifices himself to erase the Reverse-Flash seemingly from existence.

In season two, Joe becomes head of the CCPD's metahuman task-force, working with Cisco and Patty Spivot. He relies on Cisco's inventions to deal with superhuman criminals and becomes a mentor to the two. Joe later struggles with his disintegrated marriage when his estranged wife Francine resurfaces. He later tells Iris, who believed her mother was dead based on Joe's lies, that Francine is actually alive and a former addict. Francine reveals to Joe that she is dying of a terminal illness; Iris learns that Francine had given birth to Joe's son eight months after leaving him, and initially hides this fact from her father. Supported by Barry, Iris ultimately tells Joe about his son Wally who eventually shows up at their home. Once they are introduced, their connection is uneasy; Joe is unsure of how to be a father to Wally, and Wally is somewhat resentful that his detective father was not there for him. But after Hunter Zolomon / Zoom kidnaps Wally, father and son become close. After Wally is exposed to Harry's dark matter experiment, Joe suspects Wally has become a metahuman. Joe gets captured during an attempt to neutralize Zolomon, however, Barry defeats Zolomon and saves the multiverse.

In season three, Joe experiences radical differences after Barry creates the alternate Flashpoint timeline. Changes to Joe's life are made even after the timeline is reset, primarily that he and Iris are not speaking because Joe never said that Francine was alive. However, they settle matters after Barry reveals the timeline changes. Joe fears for Wally's life after discovering Wally's dreams as a speedster and was badly injured in the erased timeline. After Wally becomes a speedster, however, Joe eventually accepts his son's destiny thanks to H. R. He also begins to move on from his widowhood by dating Cecile Horton. After the demise of Savitar, Barry atones for creating Flashpoint by entering the Speed Force, entrusting Central City to Joe and Team Flash.

In season four, Joe learns that Cecile is pregnant with his child. Having a child young enough to be their grandchild causes him and Cecile to initially experience a midlife crisis. Joe and Cecile attend Barry and Iris's wedding ceremony, but it is suddenly interrupted by invaders from the Nazi-dominated Earth-X led by the Dark Arrow and his Kryptonian wife Overgirl. Barry and his allies fight the invaders, while Wally takes Joe and Cecile to safety. Afterwards, John Diggle officiates Barry and Iris's wedding in an impromptu ceremony despite Joe's absence. When Barry is on trial after being framed for "murder", Joe considers framing Marlize DeVoe to prove Barry's innocence, but is talked out of doing it by Ralph Dibny. After Barry is exonerated, Joe is among those who celebrate with him. When Cecile goes into labor during Barry's final battle with Clifford DeVoe / Thinker, Joe stays by Cecile as Caitlin helps to deliver their child; following DeVoe's demise, he and Cecile later name their newborn daughter Jenna Marie West. His friends and family also meet Nora West-Allen, Barry's and Iris's future daughter and therefore Joe's yet-to-be born granddaughter.

In season five, Barry tells Joe that Nora is beginning to annoy him by spending so much time with him. Joe pacifies Barry by revealing that Nora's situation is identical to Barry's when he was a child. Joe is later held hostage by the masked serial killer Cicada, but saved due to Cisco's intervention. He later tells Iris he thinks Cicada is a father because of how he held Jenna's blanket and talked about family while holding his hostage. After Nora's relationship with Iris worsens, she decides to stay with Joe for a while. Eventually, using all the information gathered by Joe and Team Flash, detective Sherloque announces Cicada's true identity Orlin Dwyer. After the defeat of Dwyer, and his niece's alternate future self Cicada II, and the erasure of Nora from the timeline, Joe commiserates with Barry and Iris over their loss. CCPD captain David Singh, having been promoted to Chief of Police, names Joe as his replacement.

In season six, Wally voices his suspicions about Iris's recent behavior to Joe; both are unaware that "Iris" is an impostor and the real one is trapped in a dimension called the Mirrorverse. Joe starts to investigate businessman Joseph Carver who sends Ragdoll to kill him. After Joe's car is sabotaged, Singh urges him to go into witness protection; but he refuses. Following the different attacks by Ragdoll where one had Sunshine sprung from police custody and another had Cecile's life threatened, Joe accepts Singh's offer, unaware that "Singh" is actually an impostor from the Mirrorverse, and the real Singh's whereabouts unknown. Barry, having realized what happened to Iris, visits Joe and tells him about this. Following Carver's murder, Joe is released from witness protection and joins forces with Team Flash to rescue Iris from the Mirrorverse.

In season seven, Joe meets Kristen Kramer who wants to arrest Frost. Though Joe warns Frost about this, she refuses to hide. Kramer tells Joe she dislikes metahumans because a platoon she was part of was killed by a metahuman that they trusted. Despite Joe's attempts to defend Frost in court, she ultimately resigns herself to life imprisonment without parole. Some time later, Kramer asks Joe to bring in Barry to discuss metahuman transfers after getting information that Rainbow Raider went missing, later revealing she had created bullets containing the metahuman cure with the governor's approval. Cecile advises Joe that Kramer must stop her hunt on her own, leading to Joe resigning from the CCPD to remain righteous. Cecile later reveals gaps in Kramer's past to Joe. After investigating, Joe reveals Kramer had worked with her enemies and intentionally led her unit into an ambush. Meanwhile, Joe offers Kramer his help, but she refuses and threatens to have him arrested. During a second meeting however, she reveals it was her adoptive brother, Adam Creyke, who led her men into the ambush, though she blamed herself ever since. She eventually asks Joe to help her find Creyke. Joe and Kramer are attacked while staking out Creyke's boat, but ultimately trap their attacker, Creyke, who reveals he betrayed Kramer and the military as revenge for experiments he endured due to his abilities. Joe stops Kramer from killing Creyke and they arrest him. Joe later attends a ceremony where Barry and Iris renew their wedding vows.

In season eight, it is mentioned that Joe has died six months prior to Despero's arrival as Barry has no memory of it. It turned out that the Reverse-Flashpoint timeline was created by Thawne who had Joe pushed onto the tracks in front of a moving train. Joe is resurrected after Barry undoes the Reverse-Flashpoint timeline.

== Other versions ==
- In season two, Barry meets Joe's Earth-2 doppelgänger Joseph West, a lounge singer. He does not share a close bond with his son-in-law Barry, who he blames for his daughter Iris being in the police, claiming she joined to help pay his tuition to further his forensics career, though Earth-2 Iris herself denies this. Joseph is killed after being struck by Deathstorm's energy blast.
- In the Flashpoint timeline of season three, Joe is an alcoholic who is uncommitted to his job and preferring to stay home and drink. He is estranged from both of his children and unaware that Wally is secretly the Flash.
- In a dreamworld created by the Music Meister, a gangster named Digsy Foss resembles Joe and is a rival of "Cutter" Moran, who has the likeness of Malcolm Merlyn. In addition, he has an unnamed husband who has the likeness of Martin Stein. Digsy confronts Moran outside his club and a firefight ensues, leaving no survivors.
- In an alternate 2024, Joe is shown to still be grieving Iris' death and Wally's paralysis and catatonia, both caused by Savitar. He is even estranged from Barry who severed ties with him in pursuit of vengeance against Savitar.

== Development ==
Executive producers Greg Berlanti and Andrew Kreisberg, and DC Comics CCO Geoff Johns, created the character of Joe West for the CW series The Flash. In January 2014, Jesse L. Martin was cast in the role, described as "an honest, blue-collar cop who is a surrogate father to Barry", and the biological father of Iris West. Although Barry's foster father in the comics is Darryl Frye, and Iris' father during the Bronze Age of Comic Books was Ira West, and William West since the launch of the New 52, Joe West is an original creation for the TV series. However, like Iris' family in the comics since the launch of the New 52, he and Iris were written as African-American for the TV series. Regarding Joe's relationship with Barry, Martin said, "When something is bothering [Barry], he will come to [Joe]. He won't go to Harrison Wells to talk about his real life. He comes to [Joe]." Martin also reprised his role in the TV crossover event "Crisis on Earth-X". In season five, Joe made less appearances due to Martin taking a medical leave of absence after suffering a back injury, and thus Joe became an unseen character before Martin's return. On April 13, 2022, it was announced that Martin would not return as a series regular for season nine, though he would still recur.

== Critical reception ==
Reviewing the pilot episode of The Flash, IGN's Jesse Schedeen praised the dynamic between Joe and Barry, calling it "solid". In 2015, Leah Thomas of Bustle ranked Joe fifth in her list of "original characters who help complete DC Comics' TV Universe". Irina Curovic of Comic Book Resources felt that Joe lacked a clear purpose in season 3 since, unlike the first two seasons where he was an important ally for Barry in catching criminals, "the third season mostly used Joe for the purposes of exposition". She felt that for this reason, the series no longer needed him. Screen Rant's Jason Berman ranked Martin eighth on his 2016 list "20 Best Actors in the Arrowverse". The following year, Katerina Daley of the same website included Joe in her list "7 Best (And 8 Worst) Arrowverse Characters", saying, "One of the most loving and committed fathers on television right now, Joe West portrayed with beautiful conviction by the esteemed Jesse L. Martin, is everything that a father should be."
