= Breakthrough Performance Award =

Annual US media award

The Saturn Award for Best Breakthrough Performance is presented by the Academy of Science Fiction, Fantasy and Horror Films, in conjunction with their annual award-ceremony.

== Recipients ==
Below is a list of recipients and the year their award was presented:

- Grant Gustin (2015)
- Melissa Benoist (2016)
- KJ Apa (2017)
- Amber Midthunder (2022)
