= Teen Choice Award for Choice Action TV Actor =

Entertainment award category

The following is a list of Teen Choice Award winners and nominees for Choice TV Actor - Action. This award was first introduced (along with Choice TV Actress - Action and Choice TV - Action) in 2008.

== Winners and nominees ==
=== 2000s ===
Year	Winner	Nominees	Ref.
2008	Milo Ventimiglia – Heroes	Matthew Fox – Lost; Josh Holloway – Lost; Wentworth Miller – Prison Break; Tom Welling – Smallville	
2009	Tom Welling –Smallville	Thomas Dekker – Terminator: The Sarah Connor Chronicles; Matthew Fox – Lost; Josh Holloway – Lost; Milo Ventimiglia – Heroes	

=== 2010s ===
Year	Winner	Nominees	Ref.
2010	Zachary Levi – Chuck	Jeffrey Donovan – Burn Notice; LL Cool J – NCIS: Los Angeles; Kiefer Sutherland – 24; Mark Valley – Human Target	
2011	Shane West – Nikita	Jeffrey Donovan – Burn Notice; Daniel Dae Kim – Hawaii Five-0; Zachary Levi – Chuck; LL Cool J – NCIS: Los Angeles	
2012	Adam Rodríguez – CSI: Miami	Daniel Dae Kim – Hawaii Five-0; Zachary Levi – Chuck; LL Cool J – NCIS: Los Angeles; Shane West – Nikita	
2013	LL Cool J – NCIS: Los Angeles	Scott Caan – Hawaii Five-0; Jonny Lee Miller – Elementary; Jesse Spencer – Chicago Fire; Shane West – Nikita	
2017	Grant Gustin – The Flash	Stephen Amell – Arrow; Clayne Crawford – Lethal Weapon; Gabriel Luna – Agents of S.H.I.E.L.D.; Wentworth Miller – Prison Break; Chris Wood – Supergirl	
2018	Grant Gustin – The Flash	Stephen Amell – Arrow; David Mazouz – Gotham; Lucas Till – MacGyver; Damon Wayans – Lethal Weapon; Chris Wood – Supergirl	
2019	Stephen Amell – Arrow	Grant Gustin – The Flash; Ben McKenzie – Gotham; Brandon Routh – Legends of Tomorrow; Brenton Thwaites – Titans; Lucas Till – MacGyver	
