= Grant Gustin =

American actor (born 1990)

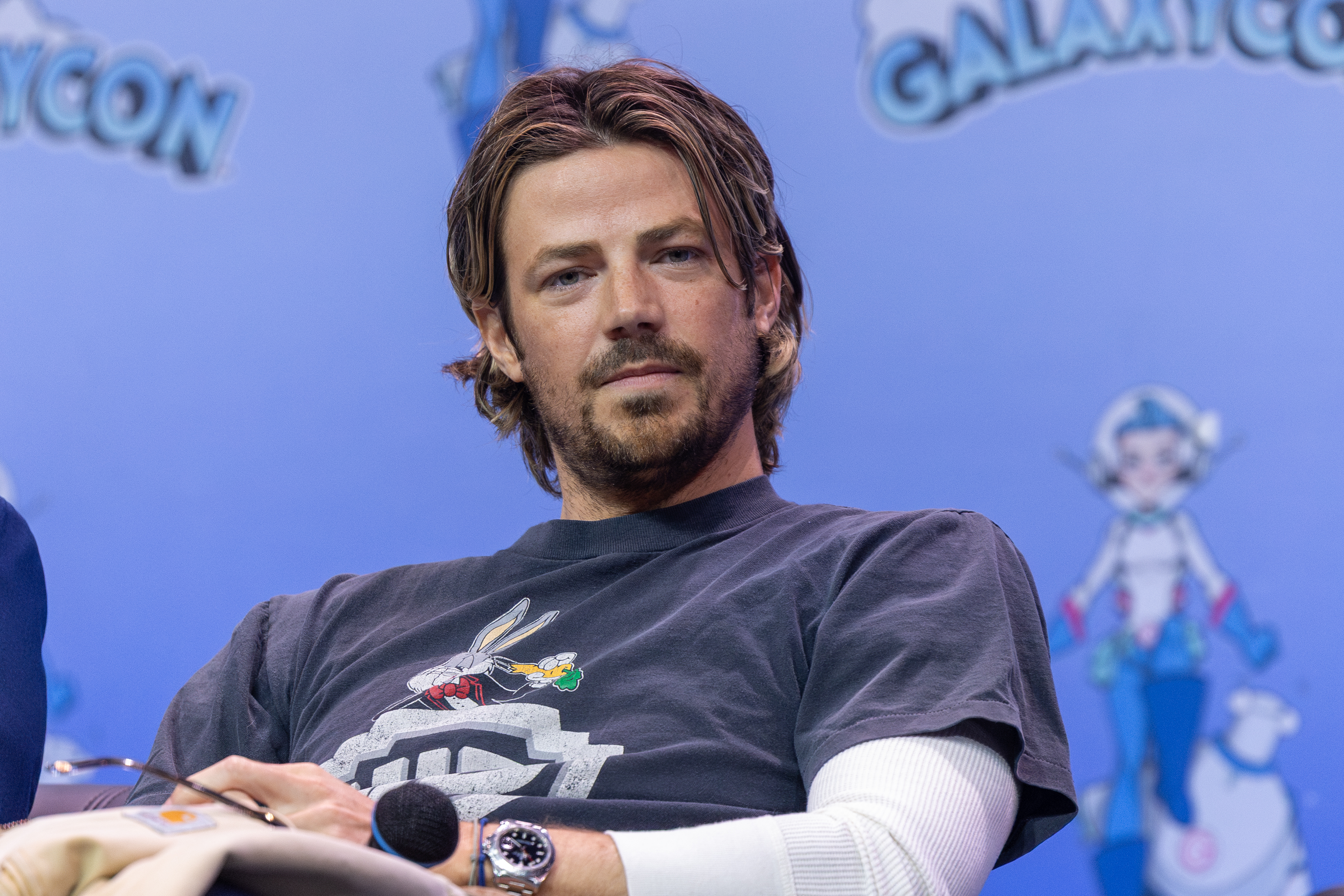
- Gustin at GalaxyCon Richmond in 2026
- Born: Thomas Grant Gustin; January 14, 1990 (age 36); Norfolk, Virginia, U.S.
- Occupation: Actor
- Years active: 2003–present
- Spouse: Andrea "LA" Thoma (m. 2018)
- Children: 2

Thomas Grant Gustin (born January 14, 1990) is an American actor. He is best known for his roles as Barry Allen / The Flash on The CW series The Flash (2014–2023) as part of the Arrowverse and as Sebastian Smythe on the Fox series Glee. Trained in musical theater, his first major credit was as part of the 2010 national tour of West Side Story; he returned to theater in the original Broadway production of Water for Elephants, originating the starring role of Jacob Jankowski.

== Early life ==
Thomas Grant Gustin was born on January 14, 1990, in Norfolk, Virginia. He is the son of Tina Haney, a pediatric nurse, and Thomas Gustin, a college professor. During his high school years, he attended the Governor's School for the Arts program in Norfolk for musical theater. He also went to Hurrah Players Incorporated which is a theater organization in Virginia. In 2008, he graduated from Granby High School and went on to attend the BFA Music Theater Program at Elon University in North Carolina for two years. He has been a friend of actor Chris Wood since college.

== Career ==
Gustin's first known screen role came while he was still in high school in the film Rain (2004). In this student film, by director/producer Neil Grochmal, during his studies at Regent University. Gustin plays a young mute who dreams of a man's tragic loss of his wife in a robbery, then later crosses paths with the man, stirring visions that help the man solve the mystery of who murdered his wife. Grochmal said Gustin showed raw talent and figured the youngster would be a future achiever in acting.

In 2010, Gustin left school to take the role of Baby John in the Broadway Revival Tour of West Side Story, and performed with the tour from its opening on September 30, 2010, through September 23, 2011.

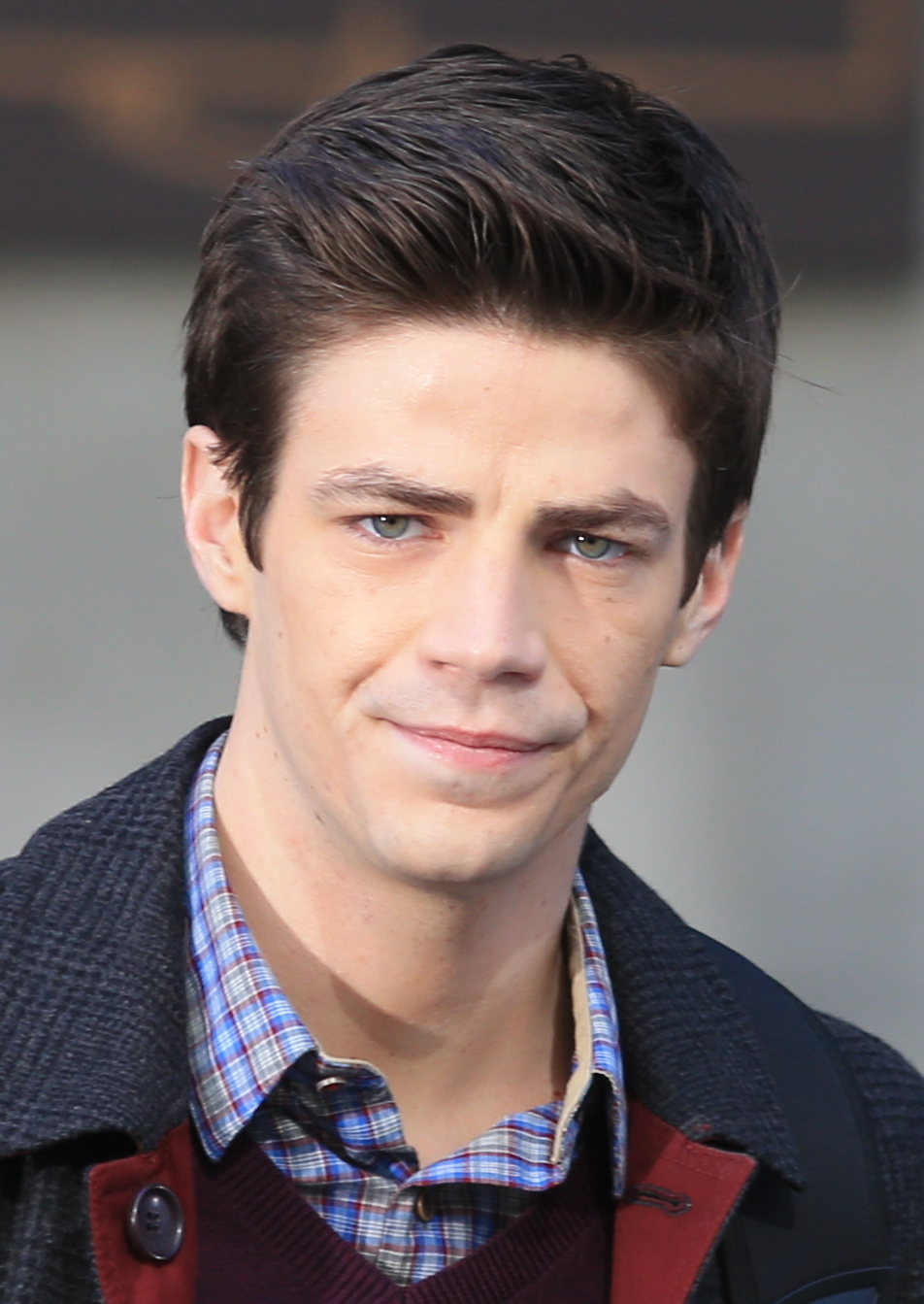
Gustin in 2014

=== Glee ===
On November 8, 2011, he debuted on the television series Glee as Sebastian Smythe, an openly gay member of the Dalton Academy Warblers. Gustin won the recurring role of Sebastian, a promiscuous and scheming character, after "an exhaustive, weeks-long casting search". He originally auditioned for a background role as a tap dancer but did not get the part. However, Ryan Murphy kept him in mind. He began filming the role early on Monday, September 26, 2011, after having finished his final West Side Story performance the previous Friday night. In January 2012, Naya Rivera (as her character Santana Lopez) and Gustin (as Smythe) performed "Smooth Criminal" as a duet in the season three episode "Michael", backed by musical duo 2Cellos. The song was filmed in a similar environment as the 2Cellos music video, in a room surrounded by empty chairs as the two musicians play. This cover debuted and peaked at number 26 on the Billboard Hot 100, number 10 on the Billboard Digital Songs, and number 28 on the Billboard Canadian Hot 100 chart during the week of February 18, 2012.

In 2012, Gustin began filming A Mother's Nightmare, an original film for the Lifetime network, in late May. The project also stars actresses Annabeth Gish and Jessica Lowndes and was shot in West Kelowna, British Columbia, Canada. On July 11, 2012, it was announced that Gustin had landed a major role in the independent film Affluenza.

=== The Flash ===
In 2013, Gustin was offered the role of Barry Allen in the second season of Arrow. He was initially supposed to appear in three episodes, the last one serving as the backdoor pilot for a potential spin-off Flash series. However, the backdoor pilot plan was dropped in favor of a standalone pilot, titled The Flash. The pilot was picked up with an initial order of thirteen episodes, and the series premiered on October 7, 2014, with 4.8 million viewers, the most for a premiere on The CW in five years. With 184 episodes aired across nine seasons in total, The Flash concluded on May 24, 2023. As part of the greater Arrowverse, Gustin reprised his role as Allen on Arrow, Supergirl, Legends of Tomorrow, Batwoman, as well as the web series Vixen.

=== Additional roles ===
Gustin starred in William H. Macy's film Krystal, which premiered in 2017 at the Virginia Film Festival and was released on April 13, 2018, by Great Point Media and Paladin In March 2020, Gustin was cast in Operation Blue Eyes as Barry Keenan. Gustin made his Broadway debut in February 2024 in the original production of Water for Elephants, originating the starring role of Jacob Jankowski. He left the cast in September of the same year.

== Personal life ==
Gustin announced his engagement to Andrea "LA" Thoma on April 29, 2017, and they married on December 15, 2018. They have two children: a daughter born in 2021 and a son born in 2024.

== Filmography ==
=== Film ===
Year	Title	Role	Notes
2003	Kid Fitness Jungle Adventure Exercise Video	Club Fit Kid	Direct-to-video
2004	Rain	Logan	
2014	Affluenza	Todd Goodman	
2017	Krystal	Campbell Ogburn	
2018	Tom and Grant	Grant	Short film
2022	Rescued by Ruby	Daniel O'Neil	
2023	Puppy Love	Max Stevenson	
TBA	Operation Blue Eyes	Barry Keenan	
TBA	Rooster	TBA	Post-production

=== Television ===
Year	Title	Role	Notes
2006	A Haunting	Thomas	Episode: "Hungry Ghosts"
2011–2013	Glee	Sebastian Smythe	Recurring role; 7 episodes
2012	CSI: Miami	Scott Ferris / Trent Burton	Episode: "Terminal Velocity"
2012	A Mother's Nightmare	Chris Stewart	Television film
2013	90210	Campbell Price	Recurring role; 8 episodes
2013–2020	Arrow	Barry Allen / The Flash (Note: Also makes appearances as Hannibal Bates / Everyman in the episode "Who Is Harrison Wells?", Barry Allen (Earth-2) in the episodes "Welcome to Earth-2" and "Escape from Earth-2", and Harrison Wells in the episodes "Gone Rogue" and "All's Wells That Ends Wells".)	Recurring role; 14 episodes
2014–2023	The Flash	Barry Allen / The Flash	Lead role; 184 episodes
2016–2019	Supergirl	Barry Allen / The Flash	5 episodes
2016–2020	Legends of Tomorrow	Barry Allen / The Flash	5 episodes (2 voice, 3 live)
2019	Batwoman	Barry Allen / The Flash	Episode: "Crisis on Infinite Earths: Part Two"
2023	Titans	Barry Allen / The Flash	Episode: "Dude, Where's My Gar?"

=== Web ===
Year	Title	Role	Notes
2015–2016	Vixen	Barry Allen / The Flash	Voice; 8 episodes

=== Theater ===
Year	Title	Role	Notes	Ref.
2010	All Shook Up	Dean Hyde	Regional	
2010–2011	West Side Story	Baby John	Broadway revival national tour	
2024	Gutenberg! The Musical!	The Producer	Broadway one night cameo	
2024	Water for Elephants	Jacob Jankowski	Original Broadway production	

== Discography ==
Title	Year	Peak chart positions					Album
Title	Year	AUS	CAN	IRL	UK	US	Album
"Uptown Girl"	2011	—	93	—	140	68	Glee: The Music, Volume 7
"Bad"	2012	—	90	—	193	80	Glee: The Music, The Complete Season Three
"Smooth Criminal" with Naya Rivera (featuring 2Cellos)	2012	59	28	46	86	26	Glee: The Music, The Complete Season Three
"I Want You Back"	2012	—	—	—	—	—	Glee: The Music, The Complete Season Three
"Stand"	2012	—	—	—	—	—	Glee: The Music, The Complete Season Three
"Glad You Came"	2012	—	74	—	—	90	Glee: The Music, The Complete Season Three
"Live While We're Young"	2012	—	—	—	—	—	Glee: The Music, Season 4, Volume 1
"Super Friend" with Melissa Benoist	2017	—	—	—	—	—	The Flash – Music from the Special Episode: Duet
"Runnin’ Home to You"	2017	—	—	—	—	—	The Flash – Music from the Special Episode: Duet
"—" denotes a release that did not chart.

== Awards and nominations ==
Awards and nominations received by Grant Gustin
Award	Year	Category	Nominated work	Result	Ref.
Broadway.com Audience Choice Awards	2024	Favorite Breakthrough Performance (Male)	Water for Elephants	Won	
Critics' Choice Super Awards	2021	Best Actor in a Superhero Series	The Flash	Nominated	
Critics' Choice Super Awards	2023	Best Actor in a Superhero Series	The Flash	Nominated	
iHeartRadio Music Awards	2025	Favorite Broadway Debut	Water for Elephants	Nominated	
IGN Awards	2014	Best TV Hero	The Flash	Won	
IGN Awards	2015	Best TV Hero	The Flash	Nominated	
IGN People's Choice Awards	2014	Best TV Hero	The Flash	Nominated	
IGN People's Choice Awards	2015	Best TV Hero	The Flash	Won	
Kids' Choice Awards	2015	Favorite TV Actor	The Flash	Nominated	
Kids' Choice Awards	2016	Favorite Male TV Star — Family Show	The Flash	Nominated	
Kids' Choice Awards	2018	Favorite TV Actor	The Flash	Nominated	
Kids' Choice Awards	2019	Favorite Male TV Star	The Flash	Nominated	
MTV Movie & TV Awards	2017	Best Hero	The Flash	Nominated	
MTV Movie & TV Awards	2018	Best Hero	The Flash	Nominated	
Poppy Awards	2015	Best Actor, Drama	The Flash	Nominated	
Saturn Awards	2015	Breakthrough Performance	The Flash	Won	
Saturn Awards	2015	Best Actor on Television	The Flash	Nominated	
Saturn Awards	2016	Best Actor on Television	The Flash	Nominated	
Saturn Awards	2017	Best Actor on Television	The Flash	Nominated	
Saturn Awards	2019	Best Actor on a Television Series	The Flash	Nominated	
Saturn Awards	2021	Best Actor on a Television Series	The Flash	Nominated	
SFX Awards	2015	Best Actor	The Flash	Nominated	
Teen Choice Awards	2015	Choice TV – Breakout Star	The Flash	Won	
Teen Choice Awards	2015	Choice TV – Chemistry (shared with Candice Patton)	The Flash	Nominated	
Teen Choice Awards	2015	Choice TV – Liplock (shared with Candice Patton)	The Flash	Nominated	
Teen Choice Awards	2016	Choice TV Actor: Fantasy/Sci-Fi	The Flash	Won	
Teen Choice Awards	2016	Choice TV: Chemistry (shared with Candice Patton)	The Flash	Nominated	
Teen Choice Awards	2016	Choice TV: Liplock (shared with Candice Patton)	The Flash	Nominated	
Teen Choice Awards	2017	Choice Action TV Actor	The Flash	Won	
Teen Choice Awards	2017	Choice TV Villain	The Flash	Nominated	
Teen Choice Awards	2018	Choice Action TV Actor	The Flash	Won	
Teen Choice Awards	2018	Choice TV Ship (shared with Candice Patton)	The Flash	Nominated	
Teen Choice Awards	2019	Choice Action TV Actor	The Flash	Nominated	
