= The Flash season 9 =

The Flash
- Season 9
- Home media cover
- Showrunner: Eric Wallace
- Starring: Grant Gustin; Candice Patton; Danielle Panabaker; Danielle Nicolet; Kayla Compton; Brandon McKnight; Jon Cor
- No. of episodes: 13

Release
- Original network: The CW
- Original release: February 8 – May 24, 2023

Season chronology
- ← Previous; Season 8

The ninth and final season of the American superhero television series The Flash, which is based on the DC Comics character Barry Allen / Flash, premiered on February 8, 2023. The season follows Barry facing against his nemeses Red Death, Bloodwork, and Cobalt Blue. It is set in the Arrowverse, sharing continuity with the other television series of the universe. It also acts as the conclusion of the Arrowverse. The season is produced by Berlanti Productions, Warner Bros. Television, and DC Entertainment, with Eric Wallace serving as showrunner.

The season was announced on March 22, 2022, and later confirmed to be the final season on August 1. Filming for the season began in September 2022 and concluded in March 2023. Grant Gustin stars as Barry Allen / Flash, with principal cast members Candice Patton, Danielle Panabaker, Danielle Nicolet, Kayla Compton, and Brandon McKnight also returning from previous seasons, while Jon Cor was promoted to series regular from his recurring status in the previous two seasons.

== Episodes ==
Season nine is broken into two "Graphic Novel" storyline arcs, known as the eighth and ninth graphic novels respectively; this numbering continues from the first seven "Graphic Novels" established in the previous three seasons.

The Flash season 9 episodes
No. overall	No. in season	Title	Directed by	Written by	Original release date	Prod. code	U.S. viewers (millions)
Graphic Novel #8: Rogue War
172	1	"Wednesday Ever After"	Vanessa Parise	Teleplay by : Thomas Pound & Sarah Tarkoff; Story by : Eric Wallace	February 8, 2023	T27.14901	0.51
One week after Eobard Thawne's defeat, Barry Allen creates a "map book" noting future events, including his promotion to director of the Central City Police Department (CCPD) CSI Division from Kristen Kramer, Cat Grant offering to buy Central City Citizen Media from Iris West-Allen, and his fight against Owen Mercer / Captain Boomerang. The battery for the Roemer Accelerator that Mercer was stealing explodes, trapping Barry and Iris in a time loop as they argue about their future. Joe West and Cecile Horton tell Barry that the future is something you create, not follow, prompting him to burn the book. On the final loop, Barry phases with the accelerator, nullifying a nuclear blast while Chester P. Runk and Allegra Garcia share a kiss. Barry and Iris accept their offers, with the latter acquiring the Coast City Gazette. Joe and Cecile talk about leaving Central City. Barry finds that "Caitlin Snow" is now neither Caitlin nor Frost. Mercer delivers the power source to a speedster with a bat-like emblem.
173	2	"Hear No Evil"	Eric Wallace	Jonathan Butler & Kristen Kim	February 15, 2023	T27.14902	0.51
"Caitlin" introduces herself as Snow, a new person born from the Consciousness Resurrection Chamber (CRC)'s malfunction. Mark Blaine has Team Flash try to reverse the process, but secretly tries to restore Frost as well, resulting in another malfunction. They learn that restoring both Caitlin and Frost is impossible and decide to let Snow choose. Meanwhile, Hartley Rathaway is attacked by a new Fiddler and goes to S.T.A.R. Labs for help. After talking with Snow, he tries to kill the Fiddler. The Flash convinces him not to and they rescue his boyfriend Roderick and their crew from a vibrational phase. Mercer steals Hartley's sonic gauntlets and retreats with the Fiddler, who Team Flash identifies as Andrea Wozzeck. Snow chooses to live her own life and chooses the name Khione. Hartley destroys the CRC, enraging Mark. The speedster uses the sonic gauntlets to stabilize into a physical form before planning to make Central City pay for Barry's actions.
174	3	"Rogues of War"	Brenton Spencer	Teleplay by : Jeff Hersh & Jess Carson; Story by : Sam Chalsen	February 22, 2023	T27.14903	0.49
The Rogues (Mercer, Wozzeck, and Michelle Amar / Murmur) steal a temporal scanner from Corbin Taft Industries. Barry realizes that they are building a Cosmic Treadmill and will go after a vibration engine next. He assembles Hartley, Mark, Jaco Birch, and Goldface to steal it before the Rogues can, but they decide to do the mission without him until Barry can prove his trust in them. He does so, but Mark betrays the group and reveals that he joined the Rogues in exchange for Frost's resurrection. The Rogues intercept Barry's group while the speedster temporarily disables his speed and escapes with the engine. Meanwhile, Khione tries to convince Allegra to stop avoiding Chester. Iris worries that the speedster is the new avatar for the Negative Speed Force. Hartley, Jaco, and Goldface agree to continue assisting Team Flash. Chester informs Team Flash that the Rogues are using equipment designed by Wayne Enterprises and Ryan Wilder / Batwoman has gone missing. The speedster unmasks herself to the Rogues as Ryan.
175	4	"The Mask of the Red Death, Part 1"	Menhaj Huda	Joshua V. Gilbert & Emily Palizzi	March 1, 2023	T27.14904	0.57
Roy Bivolo and the speedster (now calling herself the Red Death) capture Barry and cause a citywide blackout. While imprisoned, Barry learns that the Red Death's speed is artificial and also tries to convince Mark to come back. Ryan goes to Iris, but Iris realizes that she is the Red Death. Ryan reveals that she is from an alternate timeline where she and the Flash became enemies. (Note: The ninth episode identifies this "alternate timeline" as Earth-4125.) After being rejected from the Speed Force, she landed in Iris' timeline and wants to use the Cosmic Treadmill to return home. She then brings Iris to her hideout and threatens her life in order to coerce Barry into powering the treadmill, causing a lightning storm. Mark sabotages the treadmill and is overwhelmed by the Rogues while Team Flash evacuates Barry and Iris. Meanwhile, after seeing Cecile use her powers to rescue Jenna from the storm, Joe decides to remain in Central City. Chester and Allegra agree to talk as soon as the Red Death is defeated. The Red Death vows to bring war to the Flash.
176	5	"The Mask of the Red Death, Part 2"	Rachel Talalay	Teleplay by : Dan Fisk; Story by : Jonathan Butler	March 8, 2023	T27.14905	0.56
The Rogues attack CCPD and capture Kramer. While rescuing Mark, Barry is attacked by the Red Death, who drains his speed and creates psychic extensions of herself around the world with help from Gorilla Grodd. Khione realizes that she can still help Team Flash without powers and wakes Mark with a kiss. After talking with Joe, Barry goes to Grodd, who joined the Red Death because he felt abandoned after finding that the gorillas of Gorilla City had lost their sentience and were scattered following the Crisis. After Barry agrees to help Grodd restore his community, Grodd restores Barry's speed and dispels the Red Death's doubles. With help from Hartley's group and the main timeline's Batwoman, Barry defeats the Red Death and has her remanded to A.R.G.U.S. custody. Two weeks later, Joe moves to the countryside with Jenna. At his farewell party, Chester and Allegra begin dating and Khione announces Iris' pregnancy, which was not supposed to begin for another three months.
Interlude IV
177	6	"The Good, the Bad and the Lucky"	Chad Lowe	Thomas Pound & Jess Carson	March 15, 2023	T27.14906	0.57
Rebecca Sharpe, who is alive on Earth-Prime, is framed for attacking her fiancé Dominic Stewart. Cecile and Allegra work to prove her innocence, but Rebecca is kidnapped by people with dark matter refractors that deflect Allegra's and Cecile's abilities. Cecile also misses her train to Joe's and worries about being far from Jenna, but Allegra consoles her. They realize that Dominic's brother Tony embedded a refractor in Rebecca's engagement ring in order to reverse her luck ability and extort her job as a dealer in order to pay off his gambling debts. Cecile telekinetically removes Rebecca's ring, destroying the refractor while leaving Tony for Kramer. Meanwhile, Mark is convinced that Khione has powers, believing that they are what woke him and that they are all that is left of Frost. Khione tells him that Frost lives on in his memories and conjures a snowfall. The next morning, Dominic wakes, Cecile invites Allegra to move into Joe's house, and Team Flash has a baby shower. Chester reveals that Khione is not a human or a metahuman.
178	7	"Wildest Dreams"	Jesse Warn	Kristen Kim & Jeff Hersh	March 29, 2023	T27.14907	0.45
Nia Nal has been searching for an ancient source of Naltorian dream energy. She loses her powers to a hooded robed figure while in a nightmare involving Iris and goes to Central City for help. Iris realizes that her article on the Red Death is the Pulitzer-winning article from the map book and questions if she is following destiny instead of making her own choices. After Nia and Iris get pulled into a dream, Nia helps Iris realize that destiny is not one choice, but the result of a lifetime of several choices. Iris helps Nia discover that, to increase her potential, she needs to, paradoxically, give up control. After doing so, Nia meets the spirit of the first Naltorian with dream abilities, who promises to teach her. They wake and Iris publishes her article. Meanwhile, Mark takes Khione out to do activities that he did with Frost, ignoring all of Khione's ideas. She realizes that Mark still only sees her as Frost and leaves. Later, Mark apologizes to Khione and decides to leave Central City, causing Khione to inadvertently freeze Cecile's banquet out of sadness.
179	8	"Partners in Time"	Ed Fraiman	Sarah Tarkoff & Joshua V. Gilbert	April 5, 2023	T27.14908	0.52
Barry, Iris, and a group of D.O.E. agents inspecting S.T.A.R. Labs get trapped in the speed lab. When Barry notes that a "time magnet" will be stored in the Flash Museum in 2123, the group deduces that one of them must have stolen the magnet from the future without its stabilizer, trapping them in the same moment. As one of the agents is replaced by a statue, the group realizes that exposure to the time magnet will eventually kill them. Barry and Iris realize that Inspector Tao knows nothing about her job and expose her as the thief. She reveals herself as Lady Chronos. Barry charges her belt so she can reunite the magnet with its stabilizer in 2123 and convinces her to let herself be arrested instead of dying. The timeline resets, freeing Barry and Iris and restoring the agents with no memory of the events. Meanwhile, Khione meets with Carla Tannhauser off-screen. After Chester tells Allegra that he loves her, she worries about her future with him. Cecile convinces her that their relationship is not doomed, so she later admits her love to Chester.
180	9	"It's My Party and I'll Die If I Want To"	Danielle Panabaker	Sam Chalsen & Emily Palizzi	April 26, 2023	T27.14909	0.54
Team Flash has a surprise birthday party for Barry with John Diggle and Wally West in attendance. While there, Wally talks about projecting his consciousness into other timelines. Ramsey Rosso arrives and knocks out the guests. He makes Barry feel guilty for getting extra years to live while his friends die and explains to Wally that the timelines are alternate Earths of the post-Crisis multiverse. He takes over Wally's mind and has him kill Barry. Barry awakens in purgatory with Oliver Queen who, after the Crisis, has lived on as the Spectre, watching over and protecting the new multiverse. Oliver helps him accept the guilt he feels and resurrects Barry while temporarily returning with him as the Green Arrow. Wally opens a gateway into the multiverse, allowing Rosso to spread his infection. Barry helps Wally break Rosso's influence and Khione restores Diggle, who joins the others in holding off Rosso. This allows Oliver to get a clear shot into the gateway and purge the multiverse of Rosso's infection, which restores everyone. Oliver depowers Rosso and cures his HLH. Afterwards, Oliver explains that Khione is "connected to the natural world" and says goodbye to Diggle and Barry.
Graphic Novel #9: A New World
181	10	"A New World, Part One" (Note: Subtitled "Reunions" on-screen.)	Eric Wallace	Eric Wallace & Thomas Pound	May 3, 2023	T27.14910	0.42
Chester gives Allegra her first suit and Iris receives a Pulitzer nomination. Barry gets transported to the day Nora Allen dies. He goes to Joe for help and later sees his parents, but is knocked unconscious by Eobard Thawne. While investigating, Joe finds a blue crystal and becomes possessed. After being hospitalized and having lunch with his parents, Barry is approached by Thawne, who gloats about him being unable to stop his plan to kill Barry's younger self. Barry returns to the hospital and says goodbye to his parents. The possessed Joe then attacks him, stating that he is not the new Negative Speed Force avatar, but still wants to correct the imbalance Barry's legacy leaves on the timeline. Barry frees Joe and returns him to his car, but the crystal disappears. Barry then participates in the fight in which Thawne kills Nora, warning his earlier self not to interfere. Afterwards, Barry tells Thawne that he has made peace with Nora's death before he is transported away again and Thawne loses his powers. Elsewhere, a man resembling Eddie Thawne is struck by lightning at Mercury Labs, finds a file about Eddie's death, and wonders who he is.
182	11	"A New World, Part Two" (Note: Subtitled "The Blues" on-screen.)	Kayla Compton	Teleplay by : Kristen Kim; Story by : Lauren Fields	May 10, 2023	T27.14911	0.39
Chester finds traces of cobalt where Barry was taken. Mark returns, but he attacks members of Team Flash and is later shown to be possessed by the crystal. After he gasses CCC Media, Khione rescues Taylor and Aariz by growing plant cells in their bodies, but their skin turns green. They flee in horror and Mark calls Khione an abomination. The Speed Force defends Iris from Mark and explains that he became a vessel for the Negative Speed Force. After the Speed Force convinces her to embrace her power, Khione frees Mark by disintegrating and reassembling his body, but the crystal disappears. Barry returns as Iris goes into labor, but is pulled away again, and Khione makes plans to leave Central City. Elsewhere, Malcolm Gilmore—Eddie's facsimile—goes to Captain Daisy Korber at the CCPD to learn about Eddie. After hearing a voice telling him to find Iris and seeing Eddie's memories, he breaks into CCC Media and digs up Eddie's grave, only to find it empty. He realizes that he is Eddie and pulls out the bullet with which he shot himself.
183	12	"A New World, Part Three" (Note: Subtitled "Changes" on-screen.)	Stefan Pleszczynski	Jonathan Butler & Sarah Tarkoff	May 17, 2023	T27.14912	0.46
The Speed Force warns Team Flash that Barry and the crystal are in 2049 before vanishing. Eddie watches Korber get pulled into a singularity that opens over his grave. At the Flash Museum, he sees a girl resembling Nora West-Allen claiming to be his daughter, but the real Nora stops him. Team Flash 2049 finds that Eddie is subconsciously opening the singularities. Nora becomes possessed by the crystal and tries to tempt Eddie into accepting its power, but Barry appears and escapes with him. Eddie is angered by how his sacrifice did not erase the Reverse-Flash and how he was forgotten while Barry lived and married Iris. In 2023, Cecile projects her consciousness into her 2049 self, but returns when she learns that she rarely visits Joe due to work. After Chester, at Khione's urging, consoles her, she returns and frees Nora from the crystal's influence. Eddie asks 2049 Iris to be with him again, but she rejects him. As the Negative Speed Force begins to fracture the timeline, 2049 Iris talks with Barry before he is pulled away again. Now in possession of the crystal, Eddie accepts its power and opens a portal.
184	13	"A New World, Part Four" (Note: Subtitled "Finale" on-screen.)	Vanessa Parise	Eric Wallace & Sam Chalsen	May 24, 2023	T27.14913	0.46
Now a speedster known as Cobalt Blue, Eddie resurrects Eobard Thawne, Hunter Zolomon / Zoom, Savitar, and August Heart / Godspeed and gathers them in the Negative Speed Force. In 2023, they fight Team Flash and Nora. Cecile adopts her future costume and codename Virtue, Allegra saves Chester from Eobard, and Jay Garrick steals Eddie's speed. Eddie retreats into the Negative Speed Force to gain more speed. Not wanting Eddie to die, Barry follows him in and convinces him not to become like Eobard and that they can create a better world by coexisting. Eddie destroys the crystal and says he is happy for Iris; Barry returns to her at the hospital. Mark reveals that Chester is a metahuman with black hole powers. The next morning, Nora is born and Harrison Wells tells Khione to ascend as the natural order's protector. She bids farewell to Team Flash and returns her body to Caitlin. At a celebration one week later, Barry apologizes to Caitlin for how they left things and Joe and Cecile get engaged. Barry unleashes a lightning bolt and chooses Avery Ho, Max Mercury, and Jess Chambers to become new speedsters, while continuing to be The Flash.

== Cast and characters ==
=== Main ===
- Grant Gustin as Barry Allen / The Flash
- Candice Patton as Iris West-Allen
- Danielle Panabaker as Khione and Caitlin Snow (Note: Panabaker also portrays Frost in a less prominent capacity.)
- Danielle Nicolet as Cecile Horton / Virtue
- Kayla Compton as Allegra Garcia
- Brandon McKnight as Chester P. "Chuck" Runk
- Jon Cor as Mark Blaine / Chillblaine

=== Recurring ===
- Jesse L. Martin as Joe West
- Carmen Moore as Kristen Kramer
- Rachel Drance as Taylor Downs
- Richard Harmon as Owen Mercer / Captain Boomerang
- Stephanie Izsak as Daisy Korber
- Andy Mientus as Hartley Rathaway / Pied Piper
- Magda Apanowicz as Andrea Wozzeck / Fiddler
- Rick Cosnett as Eddie Thawne / "Malcolm Gilmore" / Cobalt Blue
- Michelle Harrison as Nora Allen, the Speed Force and Joan Williams

=== Guest ===
- Josh Chambers as Joey Monteleone / Tar Pit
- Javicia Leslie as Ryan Wilder / Batwoman and Ryan Wilder / Red Death (Earth-4125)
- Max Adler as Jaco Birch / Hotness
- Damion Poitier as Keith Kanyon / Goldface
- Alexandria Wailes as Michelle Amar / Murmur
- Paul Anthony as Roy Bivolo / Rainbow Raider
- David Sobolov as the voice of Gorilla Grodd
- Sugar Lyn Beard as Rebecca Sharpe / Hazard
- Drew Henderson as Dominic Stewart
- Andrew Francis as Tony Stewart
- Nicole Maines as Nia Nal / Dreamer
- Shayan Bayat as Aariz Mousa
- Lily Yawson as Original Dreamer
- Diana Bang as Lady Chronos
- Peter Kelamis as Inspector Howard
- Natalie Moon as Inspector Jane
- Stephen Amell as Oliver Queen / Green Arrow / Spectre
- David Ramsey as John Diggle / Spartan
- Keiynan Lonsdale as Wally West / Kid Flash
- Sendhil Ramamurthy as Ramsey Rosso / Bloodwork
- Patrick Sabongui as David Singh
- Matt Letscher as Eobard Thawne / Reverse-Flash
- John Wesley Shipp as Henry Allen and Jay Garrick / Flash
- Victor Garber as the voice of Martin Stein
- Jessica Parker Kennedy as Nora West-Allen / XS
- Tom Cavanagh as Harrison Wells and Eobard Thawne / Reverse-Flash
- Teddy Sears as Hunter Zolomon / Zoom
  - Tony Todd as the voice of Zoom
- Karan Oberoi as August Heart / Godspeed
- Tobin Bell as the voice of Savitar
- Piper Curda as Avery Ho

== Production ==
=== Development ===
In April 2020, series star Grant Gustin said there had been discussions about renewing the series through a ninth season, but those were stalled due to the COVID-19 pandemic. In January 2022, when the eighth season was in its mid-season hiatus, Gustin signed a one-year deal for 15 episodes for a ninth season, with his salary increased to $200,000 per episode. On March 22, 2022, The CW renewed the series for a ninth season. On August 1, it was announced that it would be the final season of the series, with an abbreviated 13-episode order. Showrunner Eric Wallace stated that the cast and crew had originally expected the series to end with the eighth season, but after the ninth season was ordered, Wallace rewrote the season eight finale to not be a series finale.

=== Writing ===
Prior to learning that the ninth season would be the series' last and that it would have only 13 episodes, Wallace created additional storylines he hoped to include in the ninth season and a potential tenth season. These would have included a wrap-up to Legends of Tomorrow, the appearance of Max Mercury, an original storyline titled The Forever War, an adaptation of the Blackest Night storyline, and a storyline featuring the Justice League fighting Despero in another alien invasion. After the final 13 episodes were ordered, Wallace's plans for the 200th episode were moved to the series finale.

=== Casting ===
Main cast members Gustin, Candice Patton, Danielle Nicolet, Kayla Compton and Brandon McKnight return as Barry Allen / The Flash, Iris West-Allen, Cecile Horton, Allegra Garcia and Chester P. Runk. Jesse L. Martin, who portrayed Joe West throughout the series, exited as a regular, though he was expected to recur in the season. In October 2022, Jon Cor was promoted to series regular for the season.

Danielle Panabaker, who portrayed Caitlin Snow and Frost in previous seasons, was reported to be returning, but was later confirmed to be playing a new character whose identity was later revealed in the second episode. Ahead of this, Panabaker stated that this character would be called Snow at the beginning of the season; Snow was later revealed to be using the name Khione. Carlos Valdes was unable to reprise his role as Cisco Ramon / Vibe for the finale due to scheduling conflicts with his starring role in the Hulu series Up Here.

Katee Sackhoff, who played Amunet Black in the fourth season, expressed interest in returning for the ninth season, but wasn't invited back to the show for reasons unknown, which Sackhoff theorizes as some involved in the show's production not liking her.

=== Filming ===
Filming began on September 14, 2022, and concluded on March 6, 2023.

== Release ==
The season premiered on February 8, 2023, and the finale aired on May 24, 2023.
