= A New World (The Flash) =

2023 four-episode series finale of The Flash

- The Flash episodes
- Promotional poster for part four
- Episode nos.: Season 9 Episodes 10–13
- Directed by: Eric Wallace (1); Kayla Compton (2); Stefan Pleszczynski (3); Vanessa Parise (4)
- Written by: Eric Wallace (1 & 4); Thomas Pound (1); Kristen Kim (2); Lauren Fields (2); Jonathan Butler (3); Sarah Tarkoff (3); Sam Chalsen (4)
- Production codes: T27.14910 (1); T27.14911 (2); T27.14912 (3); T27.14913 (4)
- Original air dates: May 3, 2023 (1); May 10, 2023 (2); May 17, 2023 (3); May 24, 2023 (4)
- Running time: 4 episodes, 42 minutes each

Guest appearances
- Jesse L. Martin as Joe West; Rick Cosnett as Eddie Thawne / Cobalt Blue; Matt Letscher as Eobard Thawne / Reverse-Flash; Michelle Harrison as Nora Allen, the Speed Force and Joan Williams; Patrick Sabongui as David Singh; John Wesley Shipp as Henry Allen and Jay Garrick / Flash; Victor Garber as Martin Stein (voice); Jessica Parker Kennedy as Nora West-Allen / XS; Shayan Bayat as Aariz Mousa; Rachel Drance as Taylor Downs; Tom Cavanagh as Eobard Thawne / Reverse-Flash and Harrison Wells; Teddy Sears as Hunter Zolomon / Zoom; Carmen Moore as Kristen Kramer; Karan Oberoi as August Heart / Godspeed; Piper Curda as Avery Ho; Tony Todd as the voice of Zoom; Tobin Bell as the voice of Savitar

Episode chronology
← Previous "It's My Party and I'll Die If I Want To"	Next → —
- The Flash season 9

"A New World" is the series finale of the American superhero television series The Flash. The series is set in the Arrowverse, sharing continuity with the other television series of the universe, and is a spin-off of Arrow. Spanning the tenth to thirteenth episodes of the ninth season, the episodes were the 181st through 184th overall. The episodes began airing on May 3, 2023, and concluded on May 24; the Arrowverse as a whole also concluded with these episodes. The series centers on Barry Allen / The Flash, a crime-scene investigator who gains superhuman speed which he uses to fight criminals, including others who also have superhuman abilities.

Grant Gustin stars as the eponymous character, alongside principal cast members Candice Patton, Danielle Panabaker, Danielle Nicolet, Kayla Compton, Brandon McKnight, and Jon Cor. Former series regulars including Tom Cavanagh, Jesse L. Martin, Rick Cosnett, and Jessica Parker Kennedy return for guest appearances. The four-episode arc sees Barry taken throughout time as he attempts to defeat the Negative Speed Force, eventually facing down the resurrected Eddie Thawne (Cosnett) who becomes the speedster Cobalt Blue.

The first and fourth parts of "A New World" were co-written by showrunner Eric Wallace with Thomas Pound and Sam Chalsen respectively. Part two was written by Kristen Kim and Lauren Fields; part three was written by Jonathan Butler and Sarah Tarkoff. Wallace additionally served as director for part one. Compton, Stefan Pleszczynski, and Vanessa Parise directed parts two through four respectively. Averaging about 430,000 viewers per episode, "A New World" received mixed reviews from critics.

== Plot ==
=== Part One: "Reunions" ===
Chester Runk gives Allegra Garcia her first suit and Iris receives a Pulitzer nomination. Barry Allen gets transported to the day his mother, Nora Allen, was killed. He goes to Joe West for help and later sees his parents, but is knocked unconscious by Eobard Thawne. While investigating, Joe finds a blue crystal and becomes possessed. After being hospitalized and having lunch with his parents, Barry is approached by Thawne, who gloats about him being unable to stop his plan to kill Barry's younger self. Barry returns to the hospital and says goodbye to his parents. The possessed Joe then attacks him, stating that he is not the new Negative Speed Force avatar but still wants to reduce Barry's impact on the timeline. Barry frees Joe and returns him to his car, but the crystal disappears. Barry then participates in the fight in which Thawne kills Nora Allen, warning his earlier self not to interfere. Afterwards, Barry tells Thawne that he has made peace with Nora's death before he is transported away again and Thawne loses his powers. Elsewhere, a man resembling Eddie Thawne is struck by lightning at Mercury Labs, finds a file about Eddie's death, and wonders who he is.

=== Part Two: "The Blues" ===
Chester finds traces of cobalt where Barry was taken. Mark returns, but he attacks members of team Flash and is later shown to be possessed by the crystal. After he gasses CCC Media, Khione rescues Taylor and Aariz by growing plant cells in their bodies, but their skin turns green. They flee in horror, and Mark calls Khione an abomination. The Speed Force defends Iris from Mark and explains that he became a vessel for the Negative Speed Force. After the Speed Force convinces her to embrace her power, Khione frees Mark by disintegrating and reassembling his body, but the crystal disappears. Barry returns as Iris goes into labor and Khione makes plans to leave Central City, but is pulled away again. Elsewhere, Malcolm Gilmore—Eddie's facsimile—goes to Captain Daisy Korber at the CCPD to learn about Eddie. After hearing a voice telling him to find Iris and seeing Eddie's memories, he breaks into CCC Media and digs up Eddie's grave, only to find it empty. He realizes that he is Eddie and pulls out the bullet he shot himself with.

=== Part Three: "Changes" ===
Eddie, in a moment of rage, inadvertently sends Korber into a singularity. The Speed Force shows up to warn team Flash that Barry and the crystal are in 2049 before vanishing. At the Flash Museum, Eddie sees a girl resembling Nora West-Allen claiming to be his daughter, but the real Nora stops him. Team Flash 2049 finds that Eddie is subconsciously opening the singularities. Nora is possessed by the crystal and tries to tempt Eddie into accepting its power, but Barry appears and escapes with him. Eddie is angered by how his sacrifice did not erase the Reverse-Flash and how he was forgotten while Barry lived and married Iris. In 2023, Cecile Horton projects her consciousness into her 2049 self, but returns when she learns that she rarely visits Joe due to work. After Chester (at Khione's urging) consoles her, she returns and frees Nora from the crystal's influence. Eddie asks 2049 Iris to be with him again, but she rejects him. As the Negative Speed Force begins to fracture the timeline, 2049 Iris talks with Barry before he is pulled away again. Now in possession of the crystal, Eddie accepts its power and opens a portal.

=== Part Four: "Finale" ===
Now a speedster known as Cobalt Blue, Eddie resurrects Eobard Thawne, Hunter Zolomon / Zoom, Savitar and August Heart / Godspeed and gathers them in the Negative Speed Force. Returning to 2023, they fight team Flash. Nora fights Savitar whom she stabs. Cecile adopts her future costume and codename Virtue, and defeats Godspeed. Allegra saves Chester from Eobard, and Jay Garrick steals Eddie's speed. Eddie retreats into the Negative Speed Force to gain more speed. Not wanting Eddie to die, Barry follows him in and convinces him not to become like Eobard and that they can create a better world by coexisting. Eddie destroys the crystal and says he is happy for Iris, and Barry returns to her at the hospital. Mark reveals that Chester is a metahuman with black hole powers. The next morning, Nora is born and Harrison Wells tells Khione to ascend as the natural order's protector. She bids farewell to Team Flash and returns her body to Caitlin. At a celebration one week later, Barry apologizes to Caitlin for how they left things and Joe and Cecile get engaged. Barry unleashes a lightning bolt and chooses Avery Ho, Max Mercury, and Jess Chambers to become speedsters.

== Production ==
=== Development and filming ===
On July 2, 2022, Arrowverse showrunner Eric Wallace revealed that the cast and crew did not expect The Flash to be renewed for a ninth season, so the writers wrote "Negative, Part Two", the season eight finale, as the series finale. That episode was originally set to end with a scene in which team Flash would bid farewell to each other, but when The CW renewed the show, Wallace and the writers removed the scene and replaced it with a teaser of Cobalt Blue.

When the ninth season was greenlit, Wallace expected the network to renew the series for an additional tenth and final season. After it was decided that the show would end with a 13-episode ninth season, he thanked the network for notifying him a year in advance. The Flash was the last remaining active series of the Arrowverse, after Superman & Lois was retconned out of the continuity into another universe, leading the episodes to serve as the conclusion of the Arrowverse. Despite this, Wallace did not write "A New World, Part Four" as an ending for the Arrowverse, hoping that the franchise would be continued through other shows.

Grant Gustin contracted COVID-19 during filming six days before wrapping up the episode, so he had to be quarantined for ten days before returning to the set, resulting in the production shutting down one day before Gustin returned. According to Panabaker, scenes were shot without Gustin to add him in later through green screen and one extra day of filming was ordered to enable him to return to the set.

=== Writing ===
==== Devising endings ====
In preparation for writing the final episodes, Wallace rewatched some of his favorite series finales, taking inspiration from those of Angel, Lost and The Office. He said that he wanted to generate similar conclusive emotions to those in the Lost finale and drew parallels with The Office finale in featuring the returns of former main characters. He considered ending on a cliffhanger as in the Angel finale, but decided that such a dramatic plot device did not fit The Flash, promising a "properly" last episode with a just a small nod at the future. Despite not being a writer, Gustin actually worked with Wallace to tweak the epilogue's voiceover so he would sound just like he did in the series premiere.

Gustin envisioned possibly ending the series with Barry Allen / The Flash sacrificing himself to keep the Speed Force alive by time traveling back to the show's first episode and becoming the lightning that struck his past self and gave him his powers, thus closing a time loop and giving him a "hero's death" like a fan theory he read claimed, but Wallace opposed Gustin due to wishing a "happy ending" for Barry and Iris West-Allen in addition to leaving their future open. Retrospectively, Gustin was satisfied with the chosen ending due to Barry and Iris deserving happiness after being a consistent couple and was glad the showrunners did not go ahead with his suggestion, as having Barry sacrifice himself despite Oliver Queen / Green Arrow / Spectre doing the same for him and their fellow heroes in "Crisis on Infinite Earths" would have "taken away" the impact of Queen's sacrifice.

Other ideas considered for The Flash finale included an "emotional" and "bigger" one involving the Negative Speed Force that Wallace had conceived years ago, but did not utilize due to the show not being renewed for a tenth season as he expected, and thus not giving enough time to set it up. Two conceived by former showrunner Todd Helbing saw the Flash vanishing in the Crisis of 2024 before later shows retconned the originally established date or a similar "cool" idea to Gustin's, showing Flash creating himself to protect his past self from Eobard Thawne / Reverse-Flash.

==== Character returns and callbacks to past seasons ====
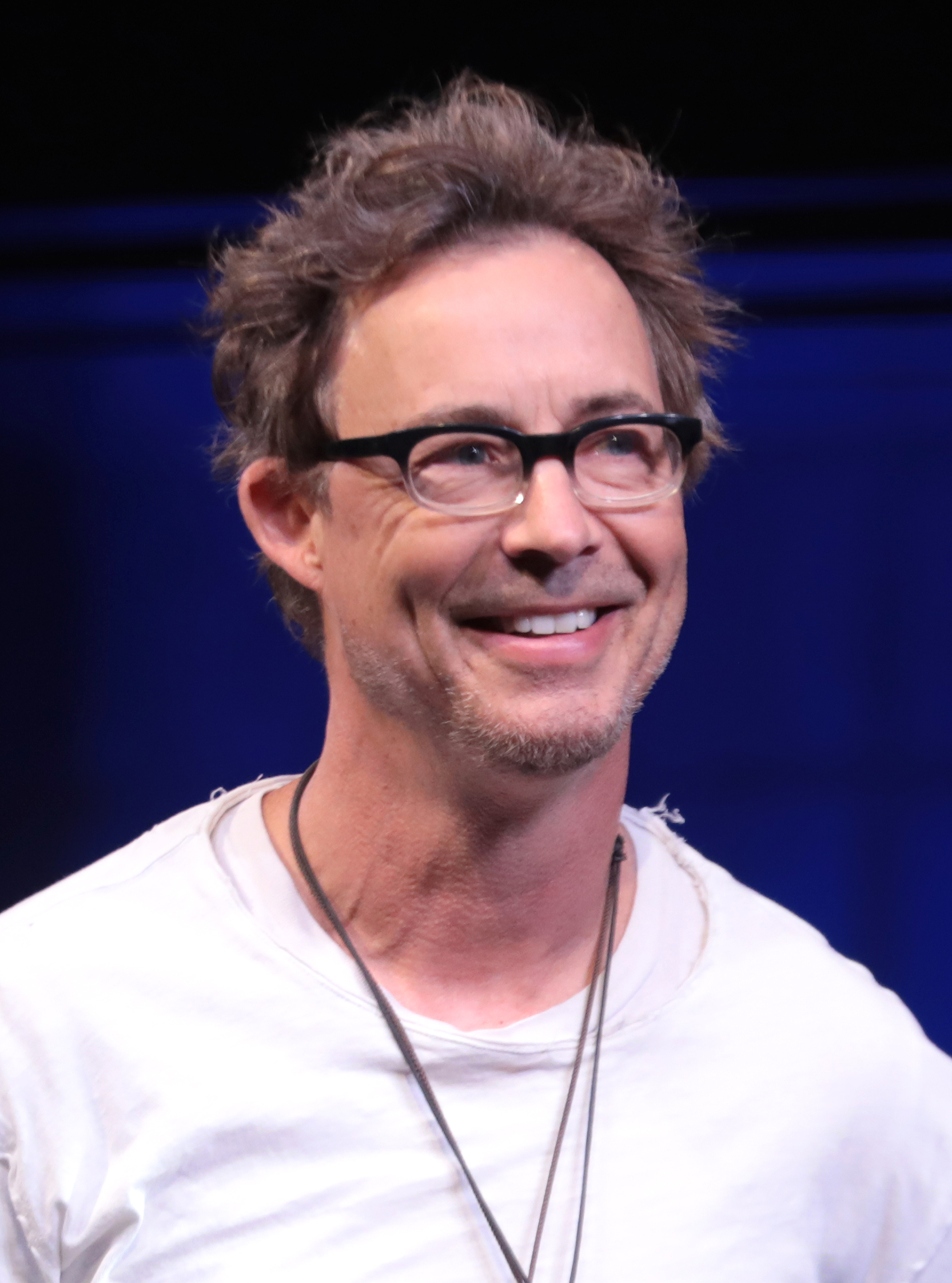
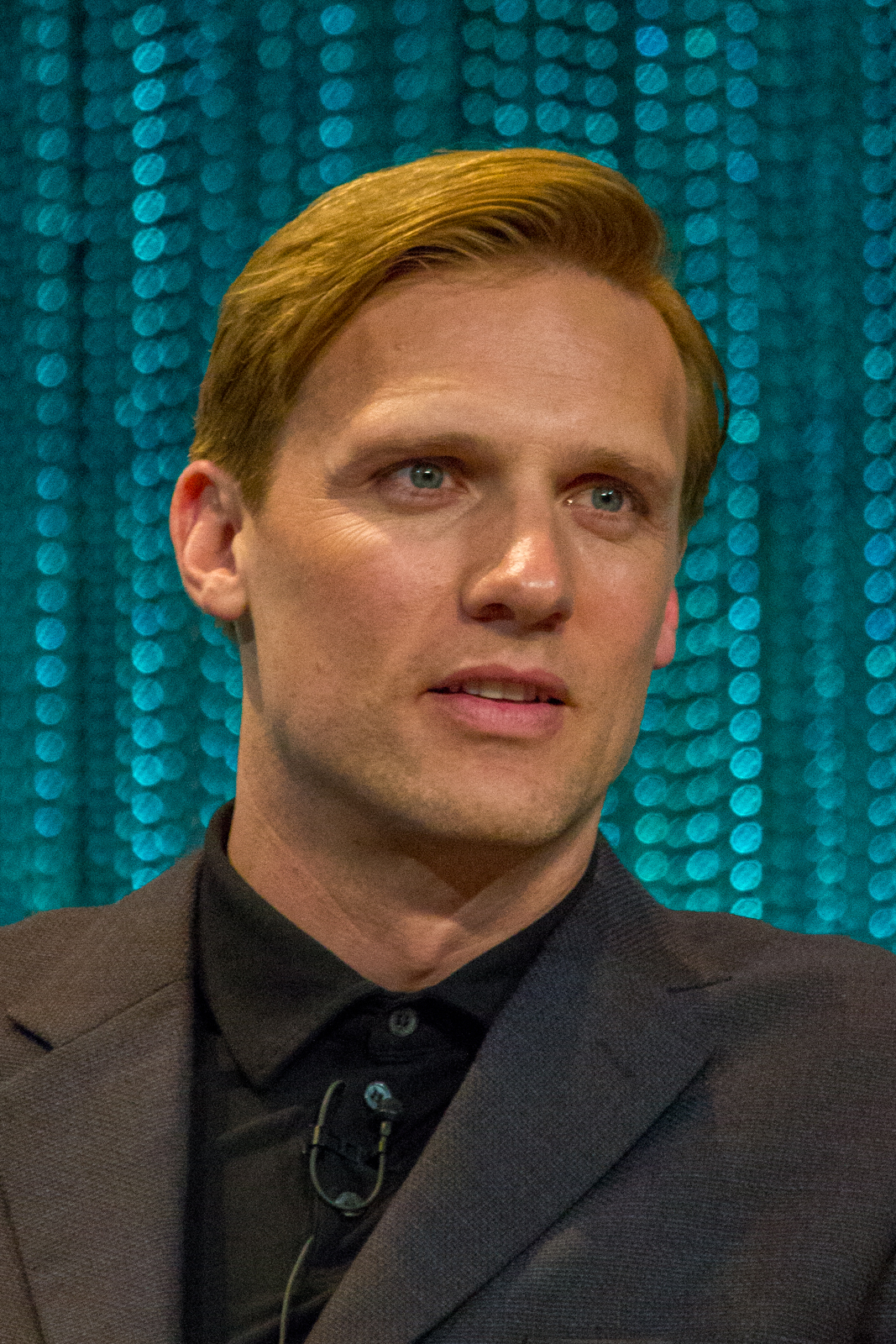
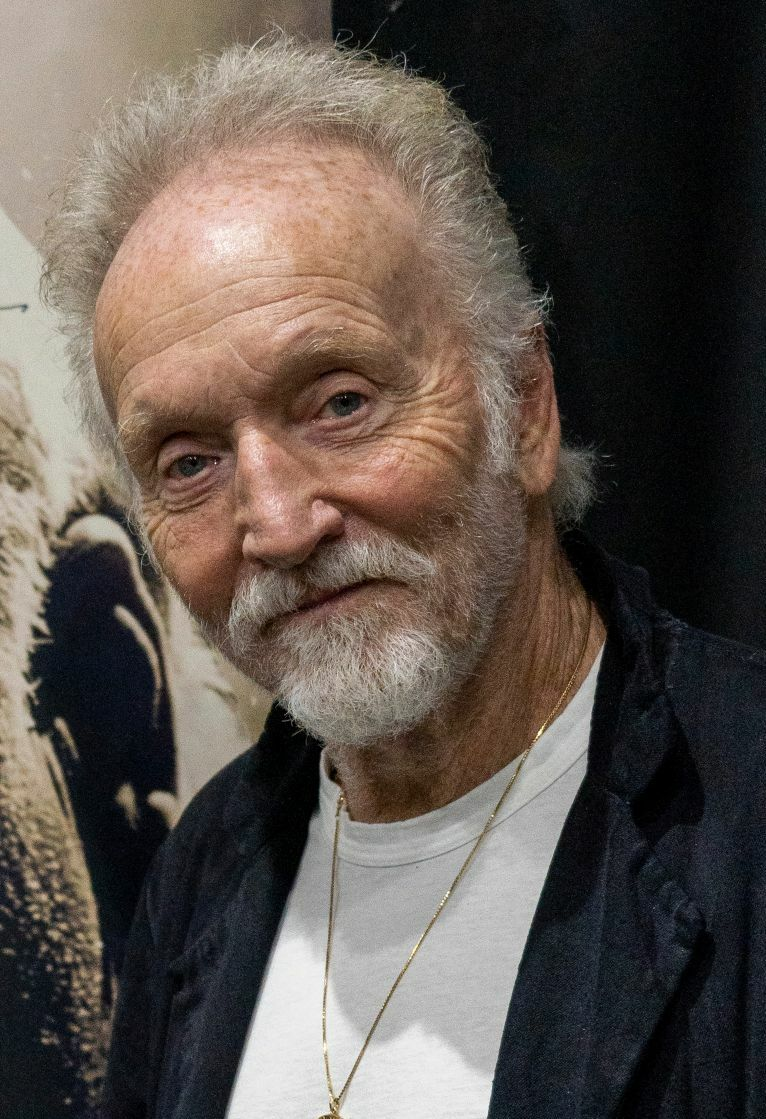
Tom Cavanagh (left), Teddy Sears (middle), Tobin Bell (right) reprise their respective roles as Eobard Thawne, Hunter Zolomon, and the voice of Savitar.

Bringing back Eobard Thawne / Reverse-Flash for the finale was always part of the show's plan, according to Wallace, who felt that Barry Allen's story had to end with "one final confrontation" with his archenemy. The episode also brings Hunter Zolomon / Zoom back to fight against Barry one last time, a reunion that Wallace had been hoping to write for several seasons. Despite this, neither Thawne nor Zolomon ultimately fought Barry, instead being paired off with Allegra and Khione respectively.

The episodes include several callbacks to previous seasons, including Barry warning his past self not to intervene in his mother's murder, (Note: First seen in the season one finale "Fast Enough".) and the newspaper with the headline "Flash Missing, Vanishes in Crisis". (Note: First seen in the pilot episode.) The final moments of part four call back to the pilot episode, with the closing monologue mirroring the opening monologue from the first season, as well as the chemicals floating when right before speed is granted to Avery Ho. In addition, the primary antagonists of seasons one–three and seven also appear. (Note: Reverse Flash, Zoom, Savitar, and Godspeed are the primary antagonists of seasons one, two, three, and seven respectively.)

=== Casting ===
Main cast members Grant Gustin, Candice Patton, Danielle Panabaker, Danielle Nicolet, Kayla Compton, Brandon McKnight and Jon Cor appear as Barry Allen / Flash, Iris West-Allen, Caitlin Snow and Khione, Cecile Horton / Virtue, Allegra Garcia / Wavelength, Chester P. Runk and Mark Blaine / Chillblaine.

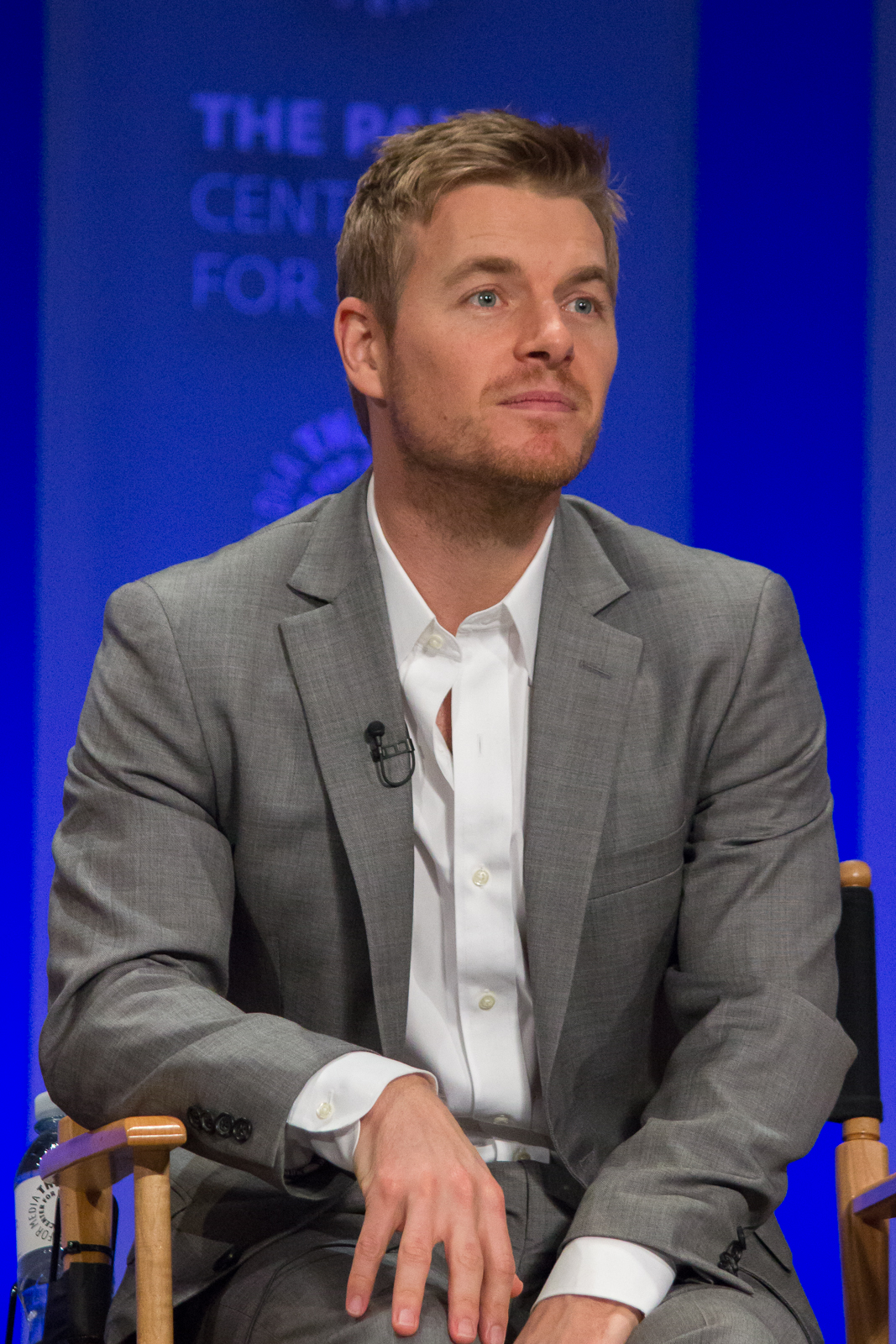
Rick Cosnett plays the villain Cobalt Blue. Cosnett was previously a regular in season 1.

The guest cast includes various former series regulars including Jessica Parker Kennedy as Nora West-Allen / XS, Jesse L. Martin as Joe West, Rick Cosnett as Eddie Thawne / Cobalt Blue, and Tom Cavanagh as a version of Harrison Wells. Matt Letscher and Cavanagh both portray versions of Eobard Thawne.

Additionally various actors who recurred in past seasons return including Teddy Sears, Karan Oberoi, Patrick Sabongui and Carmen Moore reprising their roles as Hunter Zolomon / Zoom, August Heart / Godspeed, David Singh, and Kristen Kramer respectively. Stephanie Izsak co-stars as Daisy Korber. Andre Tricoteux and Tobin Bell both guest star as Savitar, with Tricoteux portraying the character on-set and Bell voicing. Michelle Harrison guest stars as Nora Allen, the Speed Force and Joan Williams. John Wesley Shipp portrays both Henry Allen and Jay Garrick / Flash. Victor Garber appears as a younger Martin Stein.

Cosnett's return as Cobalt Blue completely "blew away" Gustin, admitting that the writers had always built moments to foreshadow a fan-rumored storyline. The episode features several cameos from future speedsters including the previously introduced Avery Ho, portrayed by Piper Curda, as well as new characters Max Mercury and Jess Chambers, portrayed by Trevor Carroll and Destiny Huggins respectively.

Carlos Valdes, who portrayed Cisco Ramon / Vibe in previous seasons, considered a return for the series finale so he could "round up" his run on the show since his first appearance in the pilot episode, having left in the seventh season in order to pursue new creative opportunities and deal with mental health issues. However, scheduling conflicts with his starring role in the Hulu series Up Here prevented him from reprising the role. Ahead of the finale's airing, Valdes felt "heartbroken" at his failure to work out a reprisal as Cisco. Nonetheless, Valdes expressed his hopes that Cisco is happy now with Kamilla Hwang, feeling that his character deserves happiness. Jordan Fisher was unable to reprise his role as Bart Allen / Impulse in the finale due to scheduling conflicts with his role in the Broadway musical Sweeney Todd.

Stephen Amell, who reprised his role as Oliver Queen / Green Arrow / The Spectre in the ninth episode, stated that when he was approached about appearing in the season, he specifically requested that his return not to be in the finale. Amell stated, "Everything about the series finale should be in service of The Flash".

=== Music ===
A cover version of Elton John's "I Guess That's Why They Call It the Blues" features prominently across the episodes. It is performed by Morgan Kibby and Butch Walker. Jesse L. Martin's character sings the song "Little Gregory Girl" to baby Nora. Martin had previously written the song for a friend's daughter.

== Release ==
=== Broadcast ===
All four parts were first aired in the United States on The CW on a weekly basis from May 3, 2023, through to May 24. The episodes averaged about 430,000 viewers per episode. All four parts held a 0.1 share among adults 18–49. Part two was the least viewed of the four, and of the series, with 390,000 viewers. The third highest was part one with 420,000 viewers. The final two parts tied for first, both with 460,000 viewers.

=== Critical reception ===
"A New World" was met with mixed reactions from critics with many citing the convoluted plot as one of its weaknesses. CNN's Brian Lowry wrote that while he believed that the series was past its prime the ending was bittersweet. Charles E Henning of Tell-Tale TV praised the choice to introduce a new villain. Writing for Den of Geek Lacy Baugher praised the return of the various characters particularly that of Cavanagh's Harrison Wells.

Joshua Patton of Comic Book Resources (CBR) felt that the episodes provided closer and "closed the loop" of Barry Allen's origin story. Also writing for CBR, Sam Stone felt that while he enjoyed the episodes, the humor fell flat and was cringe worthy at times, he praised Cosnett's performance as Eddie Thawne.

The final battle was also divisive. Charles Raymond of Screen Rant criticized the final battle, describing it as upsetting how easily defeated the villains were, claiming that it retrospectively caused the first and third seasons of the show to appear to have been pointless. Jesse Schedeen of IGN praised the final battle. TVLine's Matt Mitochev criticized the fight feeling that it was a disappointment.
