= Iris West-Allen (Arrowverse) =

Iris June-Allen
- Arrowverse character
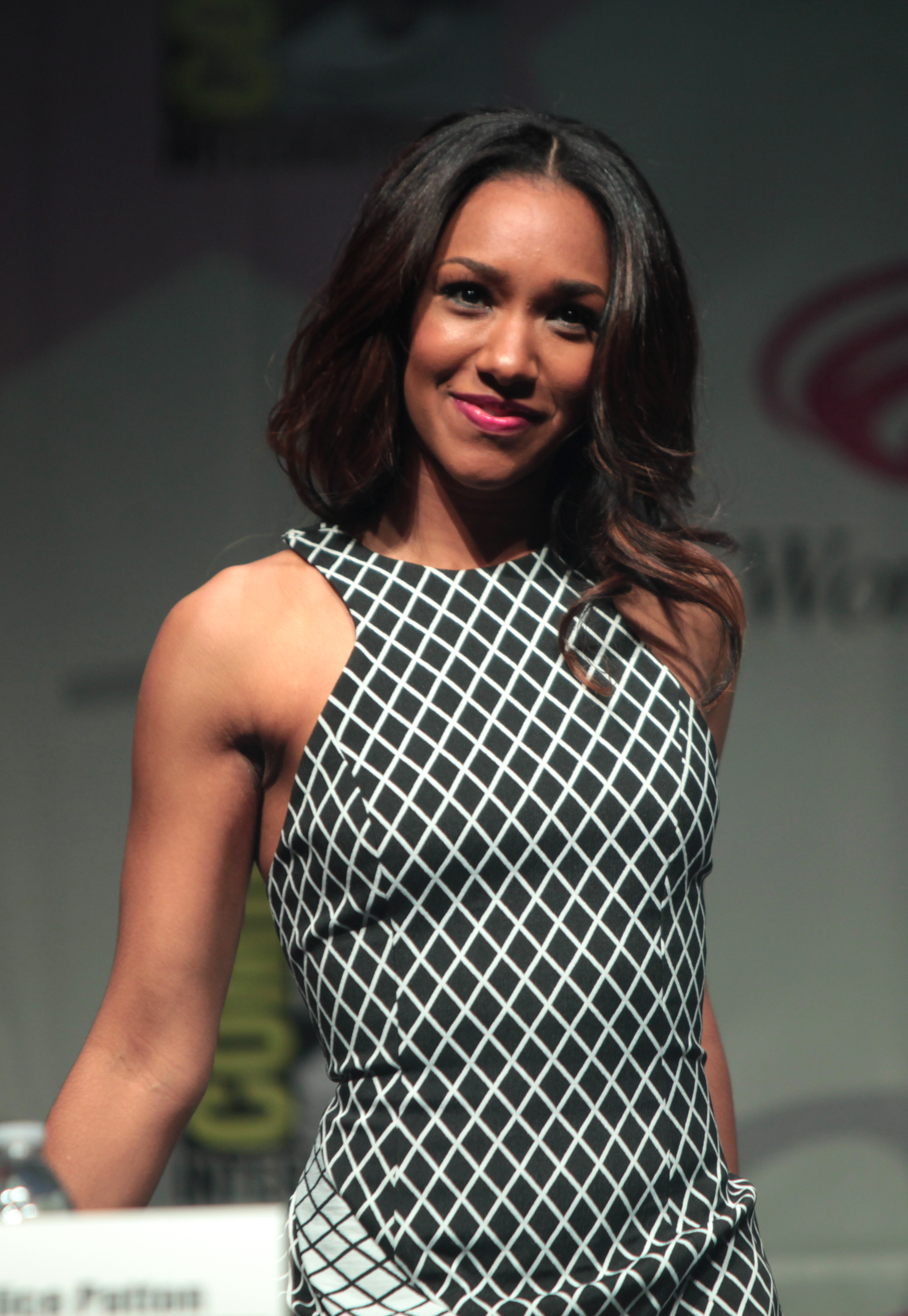
- Candice Patton portrays Iris West-Allen
- First appearance: "Pilot"; The Flash; October 7, 2014
- Last appearance: "A New World, Part Four"; The Flash; May 24, 2023
- Based on: Iris West by: Robert Kanigher; Carmine Infantino
- Adapted by: Greg Berlanti; Andrew Kreisberg; Geoff Johns
- Portrayed by: Candice Patton

In-universe information
- Full name: Iris June West-Allen
- Alias: The Flash (briefly)
- Nickname: June Park
- Occupation: Waitress at CC Jitters (formerly); Blogger (formerly); Investigative journalist Founder and editor-in-chief of The Central City Citizen
- Affiliation: Team Flash (in secret); The Central City Citizen
- Family: Joe West (father); Francine West (mother, deceased); Wally West (brother); Barry Allen (husband); Nora West-Allen (daughter); Bart West-Allen (son)
- Significant others: Eddie Thawne (fiance); Eobard Thawne (fiance; altered timeline)
- Relatives: Esther (paternal great-grandmother); Ben West (paternal grandfather); Jenna West (paternal half-sister)
- Home: Central City
- Nationality: American

Iris June West-Allen (née West) is a fictional character in The CW's Arrowverse franchise, first introduced in the 2014 pilot episode of television series The Flash. The character is based on the DC Comics character of the same name, created by Robert Kanigher and Carmine Infantino. Candice Patton portrayed Iris West-Allen.

In the series, Iris is initially a barista studying journalism, portrayed as a smart investigator, who falls in love with a speedster superhero, nicknamed by her The Streak, later The Flash. When she was younger, her father told her that her mother, Francine, died in an accident, but it was turned out she had left her, due to having a drug addiction. She later found out that her childhood best friend, Barry Allen, was The Flash, and went on to work with him and his team in S.T.A.R. Labs, eventually falling in love with him. In the first three seasons, she has the role of only the love interest for the protagonist, but in later seasons she upgraded her role.

Patton appeared as Iris West-Allen in crossovers on the television series Arrow, Legends of Tomorrow, Supergirl, and Batwoman, all set within the Arrowverse. The character has also appeared in a digital comic book series and tie-ins.

== Concept and creation ==
Iris West was first introduced in the DC Comics, as a supporting character and the main love interest and later wife of Barry Allen, the alter ego of the Silver Age version of the superhero The Flash, first appearing in Showcase #4 on October 4, 1956. On television, she has appeared in various adaptations in other media; the character has been portrayed by Paula Marshall in the 1990 CBS television series as a guest star, in animation she appears in Young Justice voiced by Nicole Dubuc. She has also appeared in the animated film Justice League: The New Frontier voiced by Vicki Lewis, next in the animated film Justice League: The Flashpoint Paradox voiced by Jennifer Hale, and the animated film Justice Society: World War II, voiced by Ashleigh LaThrop. She has appeared in the live-action film, in the DC Extended Universe's Zack Snyder's Justice League, portrayed by Kiersey Clemons, who was also supposed to appear in Justice League, but her scenes were cut.

=== Characterization ===
Candice Patton was cast as Iris West-Allen on The CW show The Flash, in February 2014. Her casting process was characterized by her, as "surreal", as she auditioned for the role in December 2013, and didn't hear from the production until January of the next year, assuming she wasn't picked. She had also expressed interest in appearing in Gotham, due to her favorite superhero being Batman. She has mentioned that her character is not based on the comics, but she had studied them to prepare for the role. With her casting she described the character as "passionate" and adding that the triangle between Barry, her, and Rick Cosnett's Eddie Thawne, was "very complicat[ing]". Patton said that she was proud that a black actress was portraying such a significant role, with her being a role model to young people, and normalizing interracial relations, while supporting the decision of race-changing, made by the showrunners. She has described her role as strong, fearless, passionate and emotional, with Iris having strength in vulnerability. She took inspiration from fellow actresses, Halle Berry and Zoe Saldaña, and politician Hillary Clinton, with highliting the fact that Iris is not a side character in the show. Throughout the show, her dressing style changing, showcasing her maturing, and becoming a leader. Patton expressed her view that the scheduling of the show is hard, and every year the storylines are getting bigger and more complex, with her being more nervous everytime the show restarts production, as a resulting, consuming more caffeine than she normally would. The actress also said that during the first three seasons, Iris and Grant Gustin's character were in conflict, and she was happy that their relationship's nature changed afterwards. When asked about how hard was to play a different version of her character, she said that she tried to stay close to the original one, and had to improvize in some instances, with her taking this version as a more tough person and protective over her in-show husband. The moment when her character learnt that its version was married to Barry Allen, she knew she had to show to the viewers that Iris was developing romantic feelings for him. For season 2, she found it interesting that Iris was starting to grow her relationship with her editor, but they were never meant to be together. When asked about her relationship with her fictional brother, Keiynan Lonsdale's Wally West, she responded by saying that "Iris is just going to continue to try to support Wally and help him find his place in the West family. And hopefully try to bridge a relationship between him and Barry. She'll help Wally discover who he really is". For season 4, she said that Iris had a responsibility to take up the role of her husband, after he vanished in the Speed Force, while also being depressed and sad that Barry's gone, as she doesn't know when or if he will return, but also angry, for him leaving her. She also added that her and Barry have no secrets anymore, and Iris is ready to face bigger threats. For the episode Run, Iris, Run, where the character gets Flash's powers, Patton said that "It's a complete role reversal [...] And the team trusting in her and her stepping out from behind the console and being a leader in a different way.", with executive producer Helbing adding that "[She's] using everything she's learned, plus Barry's expertise. But we really wanted to have this dynamic when they flop places where she really gets to know what it's like for Barry when he goes out there, and Barry gets to know what it's like for her". Patton, after watching Wonder Woman, appreciated the decision of giving powers to Iris even further. For her wedding scene on the crossover event, Crisis on Earth-X, she picked her wedding dress on her own. For season 5, when asked about its themes, she responded by saying that it is about legacy and family, especially due to the presence of Jessica Parker Kennedy's character, Nora West-Allen / XS. When asked about the CC Citizen, she said that it was made to showcase the leadership skills of Iris, but also to show the power of women. For season 6, Patton has stated that Iris was dealing with the death of Nora, and try to heal, while she has expressed interest into building her relationship with other members of the Team Flash. In 2022, she revealed that she had mood swings on set, due to her lack of vitamin D. Commenting on her absence from four episodes of season 8, she said that when negotiating her contract, she wanted to be able to get back to her home in the United States if the COVID-19 pandemic worsened, and she wasn't able to cross the Canada–United States border. On the fact that The Flash was ending with its ninth season, Patton expressed a sense of "release", that such a huge project was over.

=== Differences from the comics ===
The origin story of Iris West-Allen has been somewhat altered for the show, although even within the mainstream comics, Iris' origin has been shifted. For example, Iris's backstory in both the Pre-Crisis and Post-Crisis/Pre-Flashpoint continuities of the DC Universe established the character as being originally from the 30th century and being adopted by the West family after being sent by her birth family, the Russells, to the present while in both the Post-Flashpoint and Arrowverse, Iris is a biological member of the West family. Iris is also White in the comics and has auburn/light brown hair.

Iris' family retains certain elements from the comics while introducing new relatives or changing her relationships to certain characters. In terms of her parents, Iris' Pre-Flashpoint adopted father was a physics professor named Ira West while her biological father was Eric Russell and her adoptive mother was Nadine West, although her biological mother in her Pre-Flashpoint backstory Francine Russell shares her first name with Iris' mother in the Arrowverse Francine West. In her Post-Flashpoint origin, her parents are William West and an unnamed mother. Joe West, Iris' father in the Arrowverse continuity, is a character original to the Arrowverse. Iris is also not Wally's sister in the comics and instead has two nephews named Wallace, with the older one, who goes by Wally, being the son of her brother Rudy West and the younger one, who goes by Wallace or Ace, being the son of her brother Daniel West. Wally is a redhead while Wallace/Ace is biracial with a Black mother, Iris' unnamed sister-in-law. In the comics, Iris' children with Barry are named Dawn and Don Allen and are twins, while in the show their children are named Nora and Bart and are not twins. In the comics Bart is instead their grandson and Don Allen's son (although Bart's codename of Impulse is used both by the comic and Arrowverse iterations of the character), while Nora is an amalgamation of the comics characters Dawn Allen and Jenni Ognats, who is Dawn's daughter and Barry and Iris' granddaughter. Nora, like Jenni, uses the hero codename of XS and is biracial (Jeven Ognats, Jenni's father and Dawn's husband in the comics, is Black).

== Fictional character biography ==
In season one, Iris is a barista studying journalism through childhood friend Barry Allen's persuasion. Barry was fostered by her father Joe after his mother Nora was murdered and his father Henry convicted. She begins dating her father's partner CCPD detective Eddie Thawne, while Barry is in a coma after being struck in his laboratory by lightning from the explosion of the S.T.A.R. Labs' particle accelerator. Iris becomes fascinated by a superhuman speedster in Central City known as the Flash and starts a blog documenting his activities. She becomes an investigative reporter for the Central City Picture News through her blogging fame. When Barry admits his feelings about her, she is conflicted. She later confesses her love for Barry, but he goes back in time and negates the events of that day. Iris learns that Barry is the Flash after he saves her from Eobard Thawne / Reverse-Flash. She feels betrayed by Barry for keeping secrets and further upset at her father for conspiring with him. Iris chooses Eddie, and she and Barry decide to let things proceed between them naturally. However, in the final battle, Eddie, who is revealed to be Eobard's ancestor, kills himself to save the Flash and prevent Eobard from being born.

In season two, Iris becomes more involved with the S.T.A.R. Labs team. She learns that her mother is terminally ill and gave birth to a son, Wally, after abandoning her family. She tells her father about Wally, and they meet him at Christmas. Iris forgives her mother on her deathbed and bonds with Wally after she saves his life. Iris reconsiders a relationship with Barry after he breaks up with Patty Spivot, and professes her love to him near the end of the season. After Barry defeats Zoom for killing his father, he and Iris kiss and then he travels back in time to save his mother's life.

In season three, during the alternate Flashpoint timeline, Iris assists Wally who fights crime as the Flash. After the timeline is reset, Iris reconciles with Joe after Barry reveals the changes. She and Barry begin their romantic relationship, but she wonders if she really is needed. Barry reassures her, saying that there would be no Flash without her. Barry and Iris become engaged after an encounter with Music Meister. An alternate future Iris is killed by speedster Savitar, but Barry tries to prevent her murder. Ultimately, H.R. Wells, disguised as her, takes her place for Savitar to kill which changes the future. She, along with Barry, tries to talk down Savitar, revealed to be a future evil time remanent of Barry, but he continues his plan and attacks Barry when it is foiled. Iris shoots Savitar through the back to save Barry.

In season four, Iris takes on a leadership role with S.T.A.R. Labs, working with Cisco and Wally, while Barry is in the Speed Force. She was adamantly against bringing Barry back from the Speed Force thinking he was dead, but Cisco and Caitlin are able to bring him back. In the crossover "Crisis on Earth-X", Barry and Iris' friends come to Central City for their wedding, only to be interrupted when villains from Earth-X disrupt the proceedings. After defeating the invaders from Earth-X, Barry and Iris are married by John Diggle. However, Clifford DeVoe / Thinker frames Barry for murder shortly afterwards; not wanting to risk compromising his loved ones and allies by revealing his secrets, Barry allows himself to be sentenced to life imprisonment. Later, private detective Ralph Dibny, who joins the Flash's team, uses his new shapeshifting power to impersonate DeVoe and help clear Barry of all charges.. Following the Thinker's defeat, the team is approached by Barry and Iris' daughter from the future, Nora West-Allen / XS.

In season five, Barry and Iris meet their future daughter Nora. Iris learns that her future self implanted a power dampener into Nora since infancy to hide her powers. She also discovers her future self, despite being a good mother, hid the fact that Nora's father was the Flash from her. This leads to Nora having a negative perception of her mother out of anger and Iris is guilt-ridden by her counterpart's dishonesty. Iris wants to have a relationship with Nora and to avoid becoming the woman that the latter knew in the future. Iris establishes the Central City Citizen newspaper. Following the defeat of Cicada, Barry and Iris are devastated to find out that the new timeline has erased Nora. Unbeknownst to the couple, the changes of the timeline also causes the newspaper article about the "Crisis" in 2024 that Iris's future self wrote to change, advancing the event to occur in 2019.

In season six, Barry and Iris remain hurt by the loss of Nora despite their anticipation that a version of her might be born in their future. Keeping her promise to Nora, Iris vows to support her yet-to-be born daughter to become XS in Nora's memory. She also struggles on keeping the Central City Citizen running, and has hired photographer Kamilla Hwang and metahuman reporter intern Allegra Garcia. Iris is later dragged into the mirrorverse and imprisoned by Eva McCulloch who creates a mirror clone of Iris to do her bidding.

In season seven, Iris is still working to find her way out of the mirrorverse as Eva messes with her mind. After being rescued, the residue of the Speed Force in her comes in handy when helping to restore the Speed Force so that Barry can take on Eva. With help from Iris and Barry, Eva shatters her mirror clones. It was later revealed that the restoration of the Speed Force also sent out different energies in the sky that created the Sage Force, the Still Force, and the Strength Force. Later, Iris develops a timesickness, and was taken into the Still Force by its host, Deon Owens, to help her. Afterwards, she and Barry renew their wedding vows.

In season eight, Iris' interview with Ray Palmer at the Central City Technology Convention is interrupted by the attack of an alien from the future, Despero, which Ray and Barry manage to defeat. Iris and Team Flash start searching for information about the alien. Despero then appears and reveals to Barry that he was coming from 2031, and he was the reason for the world's destruction, referring to it as Armageddon. Iris talked to Barry, and assured him that he would never do something like that. That day, Barry asked where is Joe, with Iris telling him that he was dead. Barry ran to Jefferson Pierce / Black Lightning for help, with Iris and the Team trying to find his location to help him. After Despero found Barry's location, he traveled to 2031 to uncover what happened, and to his surprise, learns that Eobard Thawne / Reverse Flash had changed the timeline so that he was The Flash, leader of Team Flash, and soon-to-be husband to Iris, while Barry was the Reverse Flash. In the new timeline, Iris and Ryan Wilder / Batwoman talk about her marriage to Thawne, and what she wants from life. Afterwards, Barry appeared in her house, and talked her into believing that he was the real Flash, with her stopping Thawne from killing him. When Barry was running at superspeeds, he sought Iris' help to run faster, through their Paragon of Love connection, and Barry successfully changed the timeline as it was before, with Joe being alive. But, Thawne managed to escape, and was eventually captured by Barry, with him seeking to help him not get erased from existence. Iris and Barry argued not to save him, but Joe convinced them to save him. Due to Thawne's actions, Mia Queen / Green Arrow appeared from the future and taken to S.T.A.R. Labs. She and Iris had a conversation about the future, and Iris advised her to not become like her father. Eventually, Barry defeated Despero, and saved Thawne. Later, Iris and the Team went to celebrate their victory.

== Alternate versions ==
=== Mirrorverse ===
A version of the character, which was created by Eva McCulloch, from the dimension of Mirrorverse, after the kidnapping of Iris West-Allen. She is often referred to as Mirror Iris. She assumed the role of the original Iris West-Allen and filled in the blanks with Barry Allen on the real Iris's disappearance. At a dinner with Barry, they were attacked by Amunet Black, telling them to not interfere with her activities. She joined Amunet's business against Barry's wishes, but failed to take her down on her own, calling Barry for help, to also stop Goldface. Though she was able to get the mirror gun from Joe West, she didn't extract any information about Joseph Carver. When Wally returned, she had to fake knowing him, but Wally told Barry that he had a weird feeling about her. At some point, Kamilla Hwang took a picture of her that was showing she was a mirror clone, and Iris had to send her to the Mirrorverse, bringing a mirror clone of her to be replaced with. Later, Iris and Kamila went to interview Tina McGee, at Mercury Labs, but their true goal was to retrieve a prismatic refractor. As they were about to escape, Millie Rawlins / Sunshine attacked them, but Barry intervened saving them. After learning that Joe went to witness protection, due to an assassination attempt, she uses it as the reason to kick Barry out of their apartment, with the goal of weakening him. She, Kamilia, and a mirror clone of David Singh, went to Ramsey Rosso / Bloodwork and took blood sample from him, to use it to bring Eva back from the Mirrorverse. Upon Barry realizing that, he went to her apartment and the two fought, with her mirror glass, though, telekenisis, to wound him. When she realized that she was a mere tool of Eva, she decided to be self-destroyed.

== Appearances ==
Candice Patton has appeared in five out the seven Arrowverse TV series:

- The character was first mentioned in the Arrow episode titled The Man Under the Hood, of season 2, while she was indirectly mentioned in the episode Three Ghosts of the same show, by Barry Allen.
- She made her first appearance in the show, The Flash, where she is also among the main protagonists.
- From the total one hundred and seventy episodes of The Flash, as of 2022, the character has not physically appeared in eight of them, with them being The Exorsism of Nash Wells of season 6, where she was trapped in the Mirrorverse, (Note: Patton, although, appears as Mirror Iris) Rayo de Luz and Enemy At the Gates of season 7, and Into the Still Force of season 8. She also did not make appearances until Negative, Part One.
- Patton made appearances in the Crisis on Earth-X, and Crisis on Infinite Earths, with the shows being Supergirl, Arrow, Batwoman and Legends of Tomorrow.

== Reception ==
=== Critical response ===
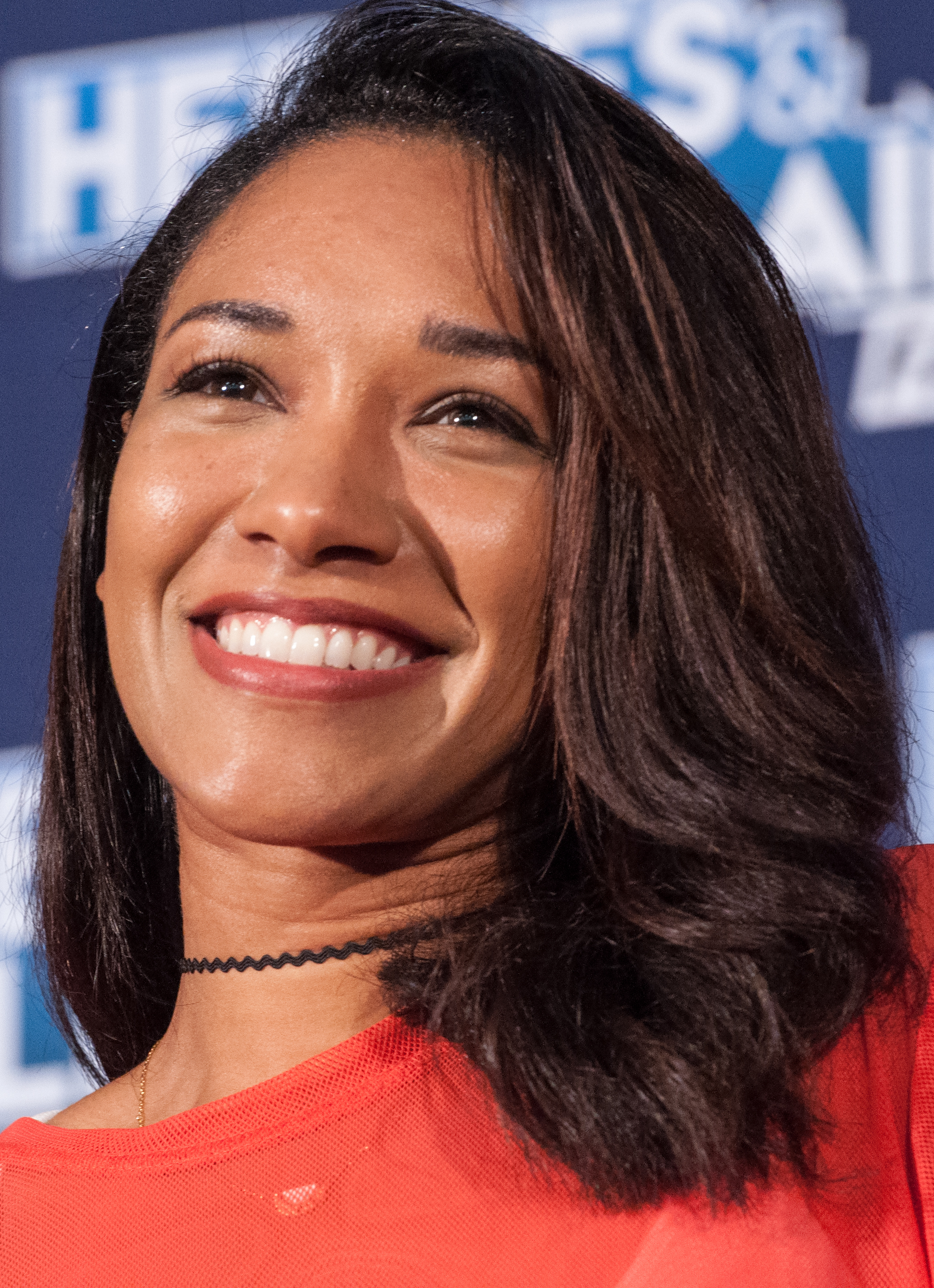
Candice Patton in 2017.

Patton was cast as Iris West on The CW show The Flash, in 2014. According to website Fansided, Patton changed the way Hollywood viewed black women and led to further roles for black women in comic adaptations, such as Anna Diop as Starfire in Titans, Kiersey Clemons as Iris West in DC Extended Universe's Zack Snyder's Justice League, Zendaya's as MJ in the Marvel Cinematic Universe's Spider-Man: Homecoming and the casting of Leslie Grace as Barbara Gordon / Batgirl in the DCEU film, Batgirl. Web site TV Guide described Patton's character as initially being depicted in a colorblind manner, eventually exploring her race more thoroughly in season 6. Patton was a target of racist attacks; fellow co-start Grant Gustin, defending her, said on his personal Instagram account that "I have her back and will have her back". Patton has been experiencing this phenomenon from the day of her casting, and many fans have noted that The CW didn't take an official stand, until a 2020 Twitter post made by the official account of the network indirectly mentioning her too. Fans quickly went to support the actress, and attack the network. According to website Decider, she was the highlight of DC FanDome event. The Looper noted that the scene of season 6 "Marathon", where Iris, trapped in the Mirrorverse, was touching hands with her husband, Barry, without him seeing her, was her best in the show's run.

Some fans, although, have noted the due to her being a successful journalist, her character looked like a combination of Lois Lane and Linda Park, both reporters in DC comics. Fans also have criticized the way her character was written, with some suggesting that she doesn't deserve the hate, because it is up to the writers on how to portray her. The moment that sparked the most controversy was when in a scene of the second episode of season 4, titled "Mixed Feelings", during an emotional moment with Barry, she said to him that "We are the Flash", implying that together both of them make up the hero. The line was met with an outrage from fans, with the website Discussing Films noting that the bad feelings that were created, continued to follow the character's reputation throughout the rest of the show, but adding that the hero was always more than one person in the show. For season 7, the PTSD she experienced in the Mirrorverse was never explored, and was forgotten, being described as "a let down" by critics. Many fans have argued that the show is not giving the feeling of a duo, between Iris and Barry, something that is the case with Clark Kent and Lois Lane in the connected show Superman & Lois. According to Collider, Patton's character was treated unfairly in season 8, and was characterized by the website as a "plot point", while noting that her death in Negative, Part One did not have any gravite or impact. The mentioned website has placed the Barry-Iris couple as the fourth best of the Arrowverse. Patton as Iris has received positive reviews and from critics, with The Flash being the most watched show in The CW history.

=== Accolades ===
All awards and nominations are for Patton's performance as Iris West-Allen in The Flash:

Year	Award	Category	Result	Ref.
2015	Teen Choice Awards	Choice TV: Breakout Star	Nominated	
2015	Teen Choice Awards	Choice TV: Chemistry (shared with Grant Gustin)	Nominated	
2015	Teen Choice Awards	Choice TV: Liplock (shared with Grant Gustin)	Nominated	
2016	Teen Choice Awards	Choice TV: Chemistry (shared with Grant Gustin)	Nominated	
2016	Teen Choice Awards	Choice TV: Liplock (shared with Grant Gustin)	Nominated	
2017	Saturn Awards	Best Supporting Actress on Television	Won	
2017	Teen Choice Awards	Choice Action TV Actress	Nominated	
2018	Saturn Awards	Best Supporting Actress on Television	Nominated	
2018	Teen Choice Awards	Choice Action TV Actress	Nominated	
2018	Teen Choice Awards	Choice TV Ship	Nominated	
2019	Teen Choice Awards	Choice Action TV Actress	Nominated	
2019	Saturn Awards	Saturn Award for Best Actress on Television	Nominated	

== Other media ==
In January 2022, it was announced that a six-issue event series titled Earth-Prime would be released over the span of three months. The first five issues would focus on stories from every show of the franchise, with the last being a crossover event. Earth-Prime #5 was scheduled to be released on May 3, 2022, focusing on The Flash. The events of the comicbook will be canon to the Arrowverse.

She has appeared in The Flash: Season Zero, a comic tie-in prequel to the events of the show, appearing in seven of the issues.
