= The Flash season 4 =

The Flash
- Season 4
- Home media cover
- Showrunners: Andrew Kreisberg; Todd Helbing
- Starring: Grant Gustin; Candice Patton; Danielle Panabaker; Carlos Valdes; Keiynan Lonsdale; Neil Sandilands; Tom Cavanagh; Jesse L. Martin
- No. of episodes: 23

Release
- Original network: The CW
- Original release: October 10, 2017 – May 22, 2018

Season chronology
- ← Previous; Season 3 Next → Season 5

The fourth season of the American television series The Flash, which is based on the DC Comics character Barry Allen / Flash, premiered on The CW on October 10, 2017, and ran for 23 episodes until May 22, 2018. The season follows Barry, having returned from his self-imposed stay in the Speed Force, as he faces down Clifford DeVoe / Thinker. It is set in the Arrowverse, sharing continuity with the other television series of the universe, and is a spin-off of Arrow. The season is produced by Berlanti Productions, Warner Bros. Television and DC Entertainment with Andrew Kreisberg and Todd Helbing as showrunners.

The season was ordered in January 2017 and filming began that July. Grant Gustin stars as Barry, with principal cast members Candice Patton, Danielle Panabaker, Carlos Valdes, Keiynan Lonsdale, Tom Cavanagh and Jesse L. Martin also returning from previous seasons and are joined by Neil Sandilands. The series was renewed for a fifth season on April 2, 2018.

== Episodes ==
The Flash season 4 episodes
No. overall	No. in season	Title	Directed by	Written by	Original release date	Prod. code	U.S. viewers (millions)
70	1	"The Flash Reborn"	Glen Winter	Story by : Andrew Kreisberg; Teleplay by : Todd Helbing & Eric Wallace	October 10, 2017	T27.13401	2.84
Iris has been aiding Team Flash in Central City for six months, but refuses to grieve Barry. A flying samurai with superpowers appears in Central City, threatening to destroy the city if the real Flash does not face him. Cisco reveals he has formulated a way to bring back Barry without destabilizing the Speed Force and tracks down Caitlin for help, but is forbidden by Iris to bring Barry back. Against Iris' orders, Team Flash successfully returns Barry, who rambles random statements and continually writes symbols on the walls. Wally engages the samurai, but is defeated. Cisco deciphers Barry's writings and finds an apparently meaningless sentence. In an attempt to recover Barry's memories, Iris gives herself up to the samurai. The plan works and Barry speeds away, rescuing Iris and defeating the samurai, who is revealed to be an android. Caitlin rejoins Team Flash, but is revealed to have been working for mobster Amunet Black, while also continuing to prevent the Killer Frost personality from emerging. The "Samuroid" is revealed to have been controlled by a supremely intelligent man in a superpowered wheelchair, whose plan was to draw out the Flash for his next schemes.
71	2	"Mixed Signals"	Alexandra La Roche	Jonathan Butler & Gabriel Garza	October 17, 2017	T27.13402	2.54
When Barry, Joe, and Cisco report to a crime scene, they discover remnants of a mysterious code. Cisco presents Barry with a technologically advanced suit, intended to facilitate his activities. He tests it out, trying to save someone from a haywire car controlled by metahuman Ramsey Deacon. Gypsy arrives on Earth-1 for a date with Cisco, who is forced to cancel it so as to focus on Deacon. Acting on a suggestion from Caitlin, Iris signs her and Barry up for couples therapy to sort out their relationship. Deacon kidnaps a witness, a former member of a tech team that stole his idea for profit. Barry and Wally go to save him, but Deacon uses his abilities to send Barry's suit haywire. On Iris' instruction, Barry throws lightning at himself, shorting out his suit. He then incapacitates Deacon, who is locked up in the meta wing of Iron Heights, revealed to be part of the intelligent man's plan. Cisco finally goes out with Gypsy. Wondering how Deacon gained his powers being absent during the particle accelerator explosion, (Note: Set during the events of the pilot episode.) Barry and Joe learn from Deacon that there are "others."
72	3	"Luck Be a Lady"	Armen V. Kevorkian	Sam Chalsen & Judalina Neira	October 24, 2017	T27.13403	2.62
In flashbacks, the intelligent man observes Becky Sharpe, a woman with unending bad luck, and determines that she will be easily manipulated. In the present, Becky robs a bank and gets away when Barry slips on marbles. Harry arrives from Earth-2 and tells Wally that Jesse has decided to break up with him to focus on her vigilantism. Cisco deduces that Becky is a metahuman with the power of favorable luck while inducing misfortune to others. Barry realizes that the portal he used to escape the Speed Force exposed an entire busload of people, including Becky and Deacon, to transformative dark matter. Harry informs Cisco that Jesse has expelled him from her crime-fighting team due to his attitude. Becky's powers expand out of control, reactivating the particle accelerator, which Harry deliberately allows, nullifying Becky's powers and leading to her incarceration. Cisco and Harry identify twelve new metahumans created on the bus and the latter suspects that an unknown party has manipulated the events surrounding Barry's return. Wally decides to leave on a journey to find himself. The intelligent man is revealed to be spying on S.T.A.R. Labs through the "Samuroid" helmet. Joe learns Cecile is pregnant.
73	4	"Elongated Journey Into Night"	Tom Cavanagh	Sterling Gates & Thomas Pound	October 31, 2017	T27.13404	1.99
Gypsy's father, Breacher, attacks Cisco, vowing to hunt and kill him in 24 hours, but allowing the romance should he survive. Team Flash learns that the bus driver was murdered and tracks down another passenger, Ralph Dibny, a former corrupt CCPD detective who Barry exposed that is now a private investigator. As two thugs attack Dibny, he is revealed to have the power to stretch. Caitlin stabilizes his powers with a serum. The team learns that Ralph has been blackmailing Mayor Anthony Bellows over his adultery, so the latter hired the thugs. Barry confronts Ralph for his actions, but Ralph maintains he was a "good cop." He later stops blackmailing Bellows, who still attempts to kill him while Breacher mistakes the former for a Plastoid, the species that invaded Earth-19 previously, and attacks him. Cisco intervenes and saves Ralph, whom Barry, having revealed his alter-ego, convinces to help arrest an escaping Bellows. Admiring Cisco's gallantry, Breacher allows the relationship. Barry recruits Ralph for Team Flash and learns that someone named DeVoe instructed Ralph to watch Bellows. Barry remembers that Abra Kadabra and Savitar both mentioned a DeVoe. Meanwhile, Caitlin finds a message on her apartment door.
74	5	"Girls Night Out"	Laura Belsey	Lauren Certo & Kristen Kim	November 7, 2017	T27.13405	2.38
Felicity joins Iris' bachelorette party. Mocking Cisco's plans for Barry's bachelor party, Ralph takes the men to a strip club, where they find Cecile's daughter, Joanie, working. Joe confronts her, but she states that she is only doing feminist research. Ralph incites a brawl, leading to the men's arrest until Harry posts bail. Meanwhile, Amunet's enforcer, Norvok, demands Caitlin's return and attacks the women when she refuses. Killer Frost emerges and repels him, later telling Iris that Caitlin accepted Amunet's employment in exchange for the means to control Frost. Learning that Amunet is holding a metahuman she calls the "Weeper", whose tears are a strong narcotic, prisoner and intends to sell him, Iris' party decides to stop her. Though Caitlin refuses to join, she attacks Amunet when seeing her friends in danger. Using a strong magnet, the team robs Amunet of her metal shards, leaving her powerless. Iris dissuades Frost from killing Amunet, who promises revenge. Both parties refuse to tell each other about their adventures. Iris asks Caitlin to be her maid of honor while Joe convinces Joanie to tell Cecile about her research. The intelligent man captures the Weeper.
75	6	"When Harry Met Harry..."	Brent Crowell	Jonathan Butler & Gabriel Garza	November 14, 2017	T27.13406	2.46
Barry trains Ralph to use his abilities, with Cisco making a stretchable suit for him. Another bus metahuman, a Lakota Sioux Native named Mina Chaytan who can animate statues, starts attacking Central City and stealing pieces of a Black Bison necklace, which she claims belongs to her tribe. When Barry and Ralph catch up to her, she attacks Barry with a caveman statue and attempts a getaway. Ralph chooses to stop her, but a little girl is injured in the process. Ralph regrets his actions, but is comforted by Barry. Chayton escapes CCPD, going after the last necklace piece held at the museum. When Barry and Ralph confront her, she brings a dinosaur skeleton to life. Barry arrests Chayton while Ralph saves a security guard from the skeleton. Later, Ralph reveals he mailed the necklace back to Chayton's tribe before visiting the little girl in the hospital, using his abilities to entertain her. Meanwhile, Harry, trying to make friends, works with his doppelgangers from alternate Earths, dubbed The Council of Wells. They deduce that DeVoe is a man named Clifford DeVoe. Barry and Joe head to DeVoe's house, but find a middle-aged man in a wheelchair.
76	7	"Therefore I Am"	David McWhirter	Eric Wallace & Thomas Pound	November 21, 2017	T27.13407	2.20
Barry and Joe interrogate DeVoe and his wife Marlize to try and get more information. In flashbacks, DeVoe and Marlize build a thinking cap to improve his brain capacity, powering it through the particle accelerator explosion. DeVoe's increased brain power accelerates his amyotrophic lateral sclerosis, forcing his wife to build him a special chair to keep him alive. Barry discovers the camera in the Samuroid head and goes to DeVoe's house, narrowly avoiding being caught by DeVoe's wife. Barry later confronts DeVoe, who reveals his true identity, leading to Cisco dubbing him "The Thinker." Wally returns to Team Flash from Blue Valley.
77	8	"Crisis on Earth-X, Part 3"	Dermott Downs	Story by : Andrew Kreisberg & Marc Guggenheim; Teleplay by : Todd Helbing	November 28, 2017	T27.13408	2.82
Barry, Oliver, Sara, Alex, Martin and Jax wake up in a Nazi concentration camp on Earth-X wearing power dampeners. The arriving SS Sturmbannführer is revealed to be the Earth-X doppelgänger of Quentin Lance, who plans to execute them, but they are saved by Leo Snart (the Earth-X doppelgänger of Leonard Snart) and Ray Terrill. Snart and Terrill take them to the headquarters of the Freedom Fighters, where the team meets the resistance movement's leader, General Schott (Winn Schott's Earth-X doppelgänger). They learn that the only way back to Earth-1 is through a temporal gateway in a research facility, which Schott plans to blow up to strand Dark Arrow (Oliver's Earth-X doppelgänger) on Earth-1. Oliver disguises himself as Dark Arrow to infiltrate the facility and discovers the Nazis have a contingency plan, a militarized timeship called Wellenreiter. Barry and Ray battle the Freedom Fighters' Red Tornado to stop it from destroying the gateway while the rest of the team enter the facility to reactivate its portal. During the battle, Stein is shot and gravely wounded. On Earth-1, Eobard Thawne prepares to perform surgery on Kara to save Overgirl. Felicity and Iris try to stop him, but are captured. Note : This episode continues a crossover event that begins on Supergirl season 3 episode 8 and Arrow season 6 episode 8, and concludes on Legends of Tomorrow season 3 episode 8.
78	9	"Don't Run"	Stefan Pleszczynski	Sam Chalsen & Judalina Neira	December 5, 2017	T27.13409	2.22
While out Christmas shopping, Barry is ambushed and kidnapped by DeVoe while Caitlin is kidnapped from Jitters by Amunet. Iris claims they have to look for both of them, despite Harry's claim that they have insufficient time and resources and that they can only afford to search for one. Caitlin is forced by Amunet to perform surgery on a metahuman named Dominic Lanse who can read minds. They try to escape, but Amunet blocks their exit. Caitlin manages to briefly incapacitate Amunet, so she and Dominic can flee the building in which they are being held. Once outside, they are rescued by Cisco and Ralph, as Iris chose to focus on finding Caitlin. Barry manages to escape from DeVoe. Team Flash celebrates Christmas at the West house and Dominic joins them. Barry gets a security alert from his apartment. When he arrives, he receives a phone call from Dominic, who reveals that Amunet re-kidnapped Dominic and DeVoe transferred his consciousness into Dominic's body. Barry discovers DeVoe's original body dead on his apartment floor and realizes DeVoe has framed him for his "murder;" the police arrive and Barry lets himself get arrested, not wanting to leave Iris again.
79	10	"The Trial of the Flash"	Philip Chipera	Lauren Certo & Kristen Kim	January 16, 2018	T27.13410	2.51
Barry stands trial for the murder of Clifford DeVoe with Cecile representing him. Cisco and Joe have to leave during the trial for a meta investigation in which a meta caused people to collapse. Singh reveals to Joe that he is appearing as a witness for the prosecution against Barry. The meta is eventually discovered to be Neil Borman, a meta whose production of radiation is unintentionally causing the illnesses and collapsing. Barry takes him on, but is ill-equipped to deal with the situation. Cisco and Killer Frost travel to the scene so Caitlin can freeze Borman, but he quickly defrosts and incapacitates Caitlin. Barry creates a vacuum seal around Borman to contain the radiation and Cisco transports it to the dead Earth-15, draining the meta and defeating him. Barry is eventually found guilty by the jury and is sentenced to life in prison. Warden Gregory Wolfe locks him in Henry's old cell.
80	11	"The Elongated Knight Rises"	Alexandra La Roche	Sterling Gates & Thomas Pound	January 23, 2018	T27.13411	2.12
Barry uses his speed to secretly help the guards contain the other inmates during a prison riot. He also befriends Dave Ratchet, his father's former cellmate. The next day, Barry meets Axel Walker, who later gets broken out of prison by his mother Zoey Clark, his father's one-time partner Prank. Axel challenges Ralph by threatening to cause chaos in the city. Ralph attempts to stop him, but is wounded by Axel and evacuated by Cisco. Ralph sneaks into the prison to talk to Barry about being scared. Barry reassures him that being a hero is not about not being scared, but about having the ability to rise above your fear. Cisco and Caitlin go to rescue the hostages, but get captured by Axel and Zoey. Ralph arrives and shields the two from an acid shower until Wells manages to hack into the shower system to neutralize its acidity. Iris visits Barry in prison, where they reaffirm their love for each other. Ralph and Cisco go get coffee and meet the excitable girl from the wedding. The girl writes in her journal with what appears to be the language Barry was using when he came out of the Speed Force.
81	12	"Honey, I Shrunk Team Flash"	Chris Peppe	Sam Chalsen & Judalina Neira	January 30, 2018	T27.13412	2.60
Cecile develops telepathic abilities due to her pregnancy combined with the dormant dark matter in her cells, but Caitlin assures her the effects should be temporary. In prison, Barry learns that Ratchet is innocent of a robbery-homicide that was actually committed by Sylbert Rundine fifteen years prior and asks the team to look into the case. Rundine turns out to be a bus meta with the ability to shrink and enlarge objects and he shrinks Cisco and Ralph while escaping. Harry's attempted cure backfires and Caitlin determines that, if they are not re-enlarged within a certain period of time, their bodies will explode. The team confronts Rundine at a warehouse where Harry tricks him into re-enlarging Ralph and Cisco. Rundine is arrested, but refuses to confess to the earlier crime. Ratchet states he has nothing waiting for him outside, but reveals his dream of living in a secluded Chinese village called Jiaju. Barry then uses his speed to take Ratchet to Jiaju to live out his dream. After capturing Barry on cameras and discovering he is the Flash, Warden Wolfe locks him in his private metahuman wing intending to sell him to Amunet.
82	13	"True Colors"	Tara Nicole Weyr	Jonathan Butler & Gabriel Garza	February 6, 2018	T27.13413	2.28
Wolfe plans to sell Barry, Ramsey Deacon, Becky Sharpe, Mina Chaytan, and Sylbert Rundine to Amunet, so they plan to escape. Cecile discovers Wolfe's plans after reading his mind. Ralph encounters a former colleague and his negative interaction with him prompts the discovery that he can shapeshift. His lack of mastery of the new ability prevents his attempt to foil Amunet's deal with Wolfe. Barry helps the metas escape the power dampeners, but they are cornered by Wolfe and Amunet. DeVoe arrives and again uses his chair to extract the metas' abilities before transferring his mind into Sharpe's body. He then kills Wolfe as Marlize looks on in horror while Amunet flees. Ralph uses his shapeshifting ability to appear as the original DeVoe at Barry's appeal, clearing his name. Team Flash realizes that DeVoe is only stealing powers from metahumans who were on the bus when the dark matter wave was unleashed, which means he will likely target Ralph as well. Back at the DeVoes' house, their marriage continues to deteriorate and DeVoe drugs his wife with the Weeper's tears to maintain her devotion towards him.
83	14	"Subject 9"	Ralph Hemecker	Mike Alber & Gabe Snyder	February 27, 2018	T27.13414	2.12
Barry is put on indefinite leave at the CCPD due to his connection with the DeVoe case. The team encounters another bus metahuman named Izzy Bowin with sound wave abilities that she can amplify with her violin. She manages to use her abilities when DeVoe (inside Sharpe's body) comes to claim her. Barry and Ralph help train Izzy to refine her abilities, which proves difficult when she gets hurt. Eventually, DeVoe shows up once again, using Dominic's and Becky's abilities to make Barry experience a brain aneurysm while using Rundine's abilities to incapacitate Ralph. DeVoe again uses his chair to transfer his mind into Izzy's body and escapes. Both Ralph and Barry comfort each other over their respective losses: Barry being let go from the police force and Ralph losing Izzy to DeVoe. These losses enforce both Barry's and Ralph's senses of determination to bring DeVoe down and save the three remaining metas.
84	15	"Enter Flashtime"	Gregory Smith	Todd Helbing & Sterling Gates	March 6, 2018	T27.13415	2.04
Jesse comes to Earth-1 to have a talk with her dad. Eco-terrorist Veronica Dale sets off a nuclear bomb, which Barry tries to stop by entering a form of superspeed known as Flashtime where everything is frozen. However, the bomb has already detonated and he and Jesse cannot stop it or save everyone with superspeed. Jay Garrick comes from Earth-3 to help, but they are still unable to stop it. Barry remains in Flashtime for hours, bringing each of his friends into it in an attempt to find a solution; they discuss options such as freezing it or sending it to another Earth, but none of those solutions prove to be viable. Eventually, Iris gives him the idea to retrieve the Quark Sphere from the Speed Force to send a blast of lightning through the bomb to disable it. Barry does so and throws the Sphere into the explosion, saving Central City. Jay reveals he is training a new female speedster to take his place. Jesse and Jay return to their Earths and Caitlin and Wells go for coffee, where they encounter the mysterious girl.
85	16	"Run, Iris, Run"	Harry Jierjian	Eric Wallace	March 13, 2018	T27.13416	2.09
Eric Frye, a metahuman with fire powers, tries to rob Central City Bank. Another bus meta named Matthew Kim touches Frye, which causes his powers to transfer to Jaco Birch. When Joe, Iris, and Barry turn up to ask Kim a few questions, Barry and Iris come into contact with Kim, causing Barry to lose his speed and Iris to gain superspeed. Inspired by Thawne, Harry plans to build his own thinking cap to outwit DeVoe. With their roles reversed, Iris becomes Central City's hero speedster, while Barry must learn to act as team leader. Birch demands money and terrorizes the city with his fire powers. Using Wells' thinking cap, the Team comes up with the idea for Iris to create a tidal wave, negating the flames and defeating Birch. Back at S.T.A.R. Labs, Kim touches Iris and Barry again, restoring the Flash's speed. At home, Iris admits that, while she did enjoy having superspeed, Central City needs Barry's light and she is happy being team leader. Wells uses his thinking cap once more, determining the final two bus metas are Janet Petty and Edwin Gauss.
86	17	"Null and Annoyed"	Kevin Smith	Lauren Certo & Kristen Kim	April 10, 2018	T27.13417	1.82
Barry and Ralph train to defeat DeVoe, with Barry becoming annoyed at Ralph's apparent inability to be serious. The team manages to locate Janet Petty. When Barry and Ralph confront her, it is revealed that Petty can manipulate a person's gravitational pull, which she demonstrates on Barry. Fearing once again that Ralph is not taking things seriously, Barry refuses to work with him. Ralph reveals his comedic attitude is due to a difficult childhood where his father abandoned him, causing him to make jokes whenever he is scared or under pressure. Barry relents and they go to stop Janet at a gala event. Janet uses her powers on Barry, causing him to float into the atmosphere. Barry tells the team to trust Ralph to improvise. Ralph detains Janet, then becomes a giant airbag to allow Barry to land safely. DeVoe's wife discovers he has been drugging her, but he wipes her memory of this, which is revealed to have happened multiple times to keep her assisting him. Breacher comes to Earth-1 to ask Cisco for help as some of his powers have failed. Harry takes the thinking cap to Thawne's time vault to recharge it and activates Gideon.
87	18	"Lose Yourself"	Hanelle Culpepper	Jonathan Butler & Gabriel Garza	April 17, 2018	T27.13418	1.88
Team Flash tracks down the final bus meta Edwin Gauss, but is followed by the Samuroid, who injures Caitlin. The team rushes back to S.T.A.R. Labs to regroup and heal. Caitlin reveals to Iris that Killer Frost is activated by her adrenal gland and she is working on a way to separate them. Harry introduces a tuning fork weapon that mimics Izzy's abilities and can defeat DeVoe. Ralph reveals to Barry that he is not afraid of losing his own life, but of Team Flash losing theirs, as he considers them family. The DeVoes attack S.T.A.R. Labs, during which Harry overcharges his Thinking Cap and collapses. DeVoe eventually manages to take over the abilities of Gauss, Janet Petty, and Matthew Kim, before transferring his mind into Ralph's body. The team tries to stop him, but DeVoe incapacitates them and alters Caitlin's DNA, removing the dark matter and Killer Frost, before leaving. Back at his lair, DeVoe uses Ralph's morphing abilities to assume his original likeness while he and Marlize plan their next move to destroy Team Flash.
88	19	"Fury Rogue"	Rachel Talalay	Joshua V. Gilbert & Jeff Hersh	April 24, 2018	T27.13419	1.90
With DeVoe moving forward with his plans, Team Flash decides to secure Neil Borman. Barry and Cisco travel to Earth-X to recruit Leo Snart as backup, but are followed to Earth-1 by Siren-X, the Earth-X doppelganger of Laurel Lance. Team Flash plans to deliver Borman to a safe A.R.G.U.S. facility, using a suit to contain the radiation in case Borman goes nuclear. Snart agrees to help, but claims he can only stay for 24 hours, as he is due to marry Ray Terrill. DeVoe attempts to intercept the transfer, but he and Team Flash are further ambushed by Earth-X Laurel, who kidnaps Caitlin, Borman, and Joe, holding them at CCPD. Snart learns about Ralph and convinces Barry to allow himself to grieve his fallen allies, which Barry eventually does, giving him the strength to defeat Laurel. Lyla transfers Borman to another facility and Leo returns to Earth-X. Cisco and Harry come up with a plan to boost Harry's thinking cap. DeVoe goes more into his "god-complex," stating that human emotion is a weakness and causing Marlize to doubt him.
89	20	"Therefore She Is"	Rob J. Greenlea	Sterling Gates & Thomas Pound	May 1, 2018	T27.13420	1.70
DeVoe starts gathering the technology required to build the Enlightenment Machine, murdering anyone who gets in his way. Barry, Cisco, Iris, and Harry attempt to trigger Killer Frost's powers in Caitlin, but do not succeed. Harry reveals to the team that the amount of dark matter he used with the Thinking Cap caused brain damage. Cisco, Gypsy, Barry, and Caitlin fight Marlize and DeVoe when they move to acquire the computers required to power the Enlightenment Machine. Flashbacks reveal partially why Marlize follows DeVoe: she was a humanitarian worker in Kenya who created a water purifier for a villager but, when warlords found out about it, they attacked and killed everyone. Marlize pleads with DeVoe when he begins choking Gypsy; she later decides to leave him, encasing his chair in a force-field so that DeVoe cannot stop her from leaving the pocket dimension. The team realizes that DeVoe plans to use the Enlightenment Machine to launch dark matter towards Earth, reverting all of humanity into a simplified state, similar to what Harry has become. The mysterious girl brings a gift to Cecile and Joe's baby shower and, after leaving quickly, runs away using speedster abilities.
90	21	"Harry and the Harrisons"	Kevin Mock	Judalina Neira & Lauren Certo	May 8, 2018	T27.13421	1.74
After Harry is expelled from the Council of Wells due to his declining intelligence, Cisco assembles a Council of Harrisons to try and come up with a way of stopping Harry's intelligence loss. Team Flash reluctantly go to Amunet for help, encountering Norvok in the process, though Barry insists Amunet must not kill. The team is eventually given a bomb made from Amunet's metal which will be capable of destroying one of DeVoe's satellites and Harry manages to work out that DeVoe's plan might be changing because Marlize is no longer with him. Iris posts an article revealing DeVoe's plan and the residents of Central City begin reporting DeVoe sightings, which Iris believes will hamper his ability to remain undetected.
91	22	"Think Fast"	Viet Nguyen	Sam Chalsen & Kristen Kim	May 15, 2018	T27.13422	1.93
DeVoe infiltrates the A.R.G.U.S. facility holding Fallout by impersonating John Diggle and kills most of the security, except for some hostages; he then overcharges and kills Fallout to act as a nuclear battery for the satellites. Barry runs to Star City and brings back John so he can reveal the location of the facility. Caitlin and Cisco ask Barry to train them in Flashtime so that they can save the hostages and Barry can follow DeVoe through the breach before it closes. In the last stages of pregnancy, Cecile's telepathy causes her to take on the personality and thoughts of anyone nearby. Harry and Iris track Marlize to Oxford and use the last extrapolator to get there. Caitlin and Cisco rescue the hostages. Searching her mind for Killer Frost, Caitlin has Cisco vibe her into a repressed memory of a childhood accident; Killer Frost was already part of Caitlin decades before the particle accelerator created any metahumans. Barry follows DeVoe through the breach and destroys a satellite with Amunet's bomb. DeVoe takes control of S.T.A.R. Labs and uses its satellite to replace the destroyed one. He initiates the Enlightenment protocol in the time vault.
92	23	"We Are the Flash"	David McWhirter	Todd Helbing & Eric Wallace	May 22, 2018	T27.13423	2.16
After the Enlightenment begins, Marlize uses Cecile's powers to send Barry into DeVoe's consciousness and find the good left in him. Barry finds Ralph alive and together they find the "good" DeVoe dead. DeVoe attempts to keep them from reaching the nexus of his mind, following Team Flash to a pocket dimension. In his consciousness, DeVoe multiplies himself to fight Barry and Ralph, taking down Team Flash. Barry and Ralph reach the nexus; Barry wakes up in the real world and Ralph reclaims his body just as DeVoe is about to kill Cecile. DeVoe reappears as a hologram through his chair until Marlize destroys it, killing him. A dead man's switch triggers the S.T.A.R. Labs satellite to fall towards Central City. Barry, Cisco, and Ralph shield civilians from the majority of the falling debris and the mysterious girl helps destroy the main piece. Aided by Marlize, Team Flash restores Harry's intelligence to a functional level; he returns to Earth-2. Team Flash celebrates DeVoe's defeat with a returning Joe and Cecile's newborn daughter, Jenna. The mysterious girl arrives; she is Barry and Iris' daughter from the future, Nora; she claims to have made a "big mistake."

== Cast and characters ==
=== Main ===
- Grant Gustin as Barry Allen / Flash
- Candice Patton as Iris West
- Danielle Panabaker as Caitlin Snow / Killer Frost
- Carlos Valdes as Cisco Ramon / Vibe
- Keiynan Lonsdale as Wally West / Kid Flash (Note: Lonsdale is only credited for the episodes he appears in, and is also credited in the special guest star bill in "We Are The Flash".)
- Neil Sandilands as Clifford DeVoe / Thinker
- Tom Cavanagh as Harrison Wells (Note: Cavanagh portrays Harry Wells of Earth-2 primarily and Herr Wells of Earth-12, Wells 2.0 of Earth-22, H. Lothario Wells of Earth-47, Wells the Grey of Earth-13, Sonny Wells of Earth-24, H. P. Wells of Earth-25, and Eobard Thawne in a less prominent capacity.)
- Jesse L. Martin as Joe West

=== Recurring ===
- Danielle Nicolet as Cecile Horton
- Kim Engelbrecht as Marlize DeVoe
- Mark Sweatman as Matthew Norvok
- Jessica Camacho as Cynthia / Gypsy
- Patrick Sabongui as David Singh
- Donna Pescow as Sharon Finkel
- Richard Brooks as Warden Gregory Wolfe
- Hartley Sawyer as Ralph Dibny / Elongated Man
- Katee Sackhoff as Amunet Black
- Jessica Parker Kennedy as Nora West-Allen

=== Guest ===
- Britne Oldford as Shawna Baez / Peek-a-Boo
- Dominic Burgess as Ramsey Deacon / Kilg%re
- Sugar Lyn Beard as Rebecca Sharpe / Hazard
- Chelsea Kurtz as Mina Chaytan / Black Bison
- Violett Beane as Jesse Chambers Wells / Jesse Quick
- Danny Trejo as Josh / Breacher
- Vito D'Ambrosio as Anthony Bellows
- Emily Bett Rickards as Felicity Smoak and her Earth-X doppelgänger
- Riley Jade Berglund as Joanie
- Matt Afonso as Weeper
- Stephen Amell as Oliver Queen / Green Arrow (Earth-1) and Dark Arrow (Earth-X)
- Victor Garber as Martin Stein / Firestorm
- Caity Lotz as Sara Lance / White Canary
- Chyler Leigh as Alex Danvers
- Franz Drameh as Jefferson Jackson / Firestorm
- Paul Blackthorne as Sturmbannführer
- Jeremy Jordan as General Winn Schott (Earth-X)
- Juliana Harkavy as Dinah Drake / Black Canary
- Melissa Benoist as Kara Zor-El / Kara Danvers / Supergirl (Earth-38) and Overgirl (Earth-X)
- Wentworth Miller as Leo Snart / Citizen Cold
- Russell Tovey as Ray Terrill / The Ray
- Frederick Schmidt voices Metallo
- Kendrick Sampson as Dominic Lanse / Brainstorm
- Mark Valley as Anton Slater
- Ryan Alexander McDonald as Neil Borman / Fallout
- Devon Graye as Axel Walker / Trickster
- Corinne Bohrer as Zoey Clark / Prank
- Bill Goldberg as Dave Ratchet / Big Sir
- Derek Mears as Sylbert Rundine / Dwarfstar
- Paul McGillion as Earl Cox
- Miranda MacDougall as Izzy Bowin / Fiddler
- John Wesley Shipp as Jay Garrick / The Flash
- Leonardo Nam as Matthew Kim / Melting Point
- Max Adler as Jaco Birch / Hotness
- Bethany Brown as Janet Petty / Null
- Arturo Del Puerto as Edwin Gauss / Folded Man
- Katie Cassidy as Laurel Lance / Siren-X (Earth-X)
- David Ramsey as John Diggle
- Victoria Askounis as young Caitlin Snow

== Production ==
=== Development ===
The series was renewed for a fourth season on January 8, 2017, earlier than usual for the series. Executive producer Andrew Kreisberg said on this, "The great thing about our dear friends at The CW and Mark Pedowitz picking the shows up as early as they did has allowed us to start building the schedules for next season." In May 2017, it was announced that Aaron Helbing would not return as an executive producer for season four, with only Greg Berlanti, Andrew Kreisberg, Sarah Schechter, and Todd Helbing returning from previous seasons. Todd Helbing and Kreisberg were slated to serve as the season's showrunners. In November 2017, Kreisberg was suspended from his role as executive producer and showrunner on The Flash over allegations of sexual harassment. By the end of the month, he had been fired, with his name eventually being removed from the credits from all shows he worked on. In addition, Berlanti would take additional responsibilities working with Helbing to co-showrun the season.

=== Writing ===
The way I see it is, time is non-linear and everything is happening at once in the Speed Force. In some ways he's had an awakening and he's had a rebirth. Our first episode is called 'Reborn,' and it is a rebirth for Barry, but he's kind of scrambled, too, because he's experienced so much so quick over the course of six months, even though for him it was an eternity. He's not Barry when we see him for the first time.

— Grant Gustin on the rebirth of Barry in season four.

In March 2017, Kreisberg confirmed that the main villain for the fourth season would not be a speedster, like the previous three seasons. Executive producers Aaron and Todd Helbing also mentioned that there would be less time travel in the season, with Aaron saying, "We like playing with the timelines and the different time periods and future and past. For now, I think we're going to focus on the present." In June 2017, Clifford DeVoe / Thinker was reported to be the main villain of the season. He was first hinted in the third season episode "Abra Kadabra" when the titular villain mentions him among the Flash's greatest enemies, and again in the season finale "Finish Line" when Savitar mentions facing DeVoe but states that the Flash has not dealt with him yet. At the series' San Diego Comic-Con panel, the speculation was confirmed, with Todd Helbing saying, "With three Speedsters in a row, this year it's the fastest man alive against the fastest mind alive." He added that the writers were "making a conscious effort this year to get the fun quotient back up".

Regarding the possibility of Wally West taking on the mantle of the Flash in Barry's absence, Keiynan Lonsdale said that "It's not something that's on my radar. I feel as though there is so much story to tell and Wally has so much growing to do... We need to see how these characters realistically get to where they are headed for." With the action picking up six months after season three, Kid Flash and Vibe are left to protect Central City, with Carlos Valdes saying "the team is sort of clutching at straws to keep the city together,... there is a unanimous feeling amongst the remaining members that it's just not the same without Barry... So in light of that, Cisco does whatever it takes to get his friends back." Valdes also confirmed the return of Cisco's more lighthearted joking manner. Candice Patton explained Iris West's larger role within Team Flash as "a way of distracting herself," adding that "[Iris] is forced to deal with that anger and resentment and abandonment by kind of focusing on protecting Central City... We're seeing a very different Iris, almost a very hardened Iris." Kreisberg also hinted at some major growth for Iris this season, and noted that "the season premiere is all about Iris and Cisco, not Barry".

In July 2017, Sterling Gates, DC Comics comic book writer, joined the season's writing staff. At the TCA press tour in August 2017, Pedowitz stated that the fourth season of The Flash is "going to try to find the lightness... of the Barry Allen of the first two seasons," and said that the show was likely "done with Speedster villains". Later in the month, Kreisberg confirmed the return of Harry Wells from Earth-2, saying that "season 4 for Harry is really realizing what he's missing in his life and what it is he needs to become a better, more complete person, and so he's going to be going on a fairly epic emotional journey this season that is tied to the Thinker's plan," in addition to confirming the introduction of a new version of the Wells character.

In September 2017, Helbing noted "There's a lot of love in the air this season," and compared Barry and Iris' reunion to "somebody going off to war for six months and coming back. There's a lot that Iris experienced that Barry didn't when he was gone, and it's really [about] the fun and the emotional component of making up that time when they weren't together." Helbing also explained that the Speed Force "let [Barry] deal with all of the baggage [from the past three seasons]. When he comes out, he's sort of left that all behind." That month, Kreisberg also confirmed that Barry and Iris will be getting married this season, while also revealing that the pair will be going to couples therapy since "[they] keep comically clashing inadvertently because [both are] used to being in charge, and so they wind up going... to work through it." He added, "The two of them with the therapist is some of the funniest stuff we have ever done on this show, but it also leads to a deepening of their relationship."

=== Casting ===
Main cast members Grant Gustin, Candice Patton, Danielle Panabaker, Carlos Valdes, Keiynan Lonsdale, Tom Cavanagh, and Jesse L. Martin return from previous seasons as Barry Allen / The Flash, Iris West, Caitlin Snow / Killer Frost, Cisco Ramon / Vibe, Wally West / Kid Flash, Harrison Wells, and Joe West, respectively. Cavanagh primarily portrayed Harry Wells from Earth-2 in the season, in addition to several other versions of Wells in smaller roles: Herr Wells of Earth-12, Wells 2.0 of Earth-22, H. Lothario Wells of Earth-47, Wells the Grey of Earth-13, Sonny Wells of Earth-24 and H. P. Wells of Earth-25. Also returning from earlier in the series is Jessica Camacho as Gypsy. It was revealed that Tom Felton, who joined the cast as Julian Albert in the third season, would not be a series regular in the fourth season, and that there were no plans for him to appear. Julian's absence will be addressed "pretty quickly — there's a reason why he's no longer with the team," said Helbing. In the season premiere, it is revealed that Julian has returned to London. Kreisberg also confirmed that he had put on hold the planned return of Violett Beane as Jesse Quick due to the high number of speedsters on the show, but did not rule out a possible return in the future. Beane eventually appeared as Jesse in "Luck Be a Lady". Britne Oldford, who previously appeared as Shawna Baez / Peek-a-Boo in the first season and the web series The Chronicles of Cisco, reprised her role in the season premiere.

In July 2017, Neil Sandilands was announced to be cast as Clifford DeVoe, a metahuman genius who embarks on a season-long battle with the Flash in order to fix all that he deems wrong with the world; while Kim Engelbrecht as Marlize DeVoe, DeVoe's loyal wife, a highly intelligent engineer who designs devices for him; and Danny Trejo as Breacher, a bounty hunter from Earth-19 and the Gypsy's dad. Also in June, the series was looking to cast a role that "should put the visual effects department to the test", with the role later revealed to be Ralph Dibny / Elongated Man, a metahuman with the ability to stretch his body to superhuman lengths and sizes. Hartley Sawyer was cast in the recurring role that July as the fast-talking private investigator who after discovering his abilities will help Team Flash solve one of Central City's greatest mysteries. The character was previously mentioned in the first season, as one of the fourteen people who seemingly died as a result of the particle accelerator explosion. The next month, Katee Sackhoff was announced in the recurring role of Amunet Black, who operates an underground black market of metahuman supervillains.

=== Filming ===
Filming for the season began on July 4, 2017, in Vancouver, British Columbia, and concluded on April 21, 2018. Kevin Smith returned to direct an episode in January 2018.

=== Music ===
In August 2017, series composer Blake Neely and Nathaniel Blume began to compose the music for the fourth season.

=== Arrowverse tie-ins ===
In May 2017, The CW president Mark Pedowitz officially announced plans for a four-show Arrowverse crossover event, crossing over episodes of the television series Supergirl, The Flash, Legends of Tomorrow, and Arrow. The crossover, Crisis on Earth-X, began with Supergirl and a special airing of Arrow on November 27, 2017, and concluded on The Flash and Legends of Tomorrow on November 28. Prior to that, Arrow actress Emily Bett Rickards appears as Felicity Smoak in the fifth episode of the season. Following the crossover, Katie Cassidy (who has previously appeared on The Flash as both Laurel Lance and Black Siren) appears in the nineteenth episode as Siren-X, an alternate version of Laurel from Earth-X. Arrow actor David Ramsey appears as John Diggle in the twenty-second episode.

== Marketing ==
In July 2017, cast from the series appeared at San Diego Comic-Con to promote the season, where exclusive footage was shown. During the panel, a trailer for the season was shown, with James Whitbrook at io9 feeling that despite the "grim" tone, there was "some fun signs of the team coming together to protect the city without [Barry],... Sprinkle in a few wacky things, like, say a goddamn Samuroid ripped straight from the comics, and ladies and gents, you've got a good season of The Flash lined up." Ben Pearson with /Film felt seeing Iris West deal with the absence of Barry was "a nice change of pace for that character", but anticipated that "Barry [would] be back two or three episodes in at the latest." Collider's Allison Keene also noted Iris "getting an actual storyline" with Barry gone, and similarly presumed that he "[would] be back in the fold by the end of the first episode" alike to Flashpoint in the third season. She added, "There are some new foes, lots of action, plenty of tech — it's great!"

== Release ==
=== Broadcast ===
The season began airing on October 10, 2017, on The CW in the United States, and on CTV in Canada. The season concluded on May 22, 2018. Sky One acquired the rights to air the season in the UK & Ireland, airing it alongside the other Arrowverse shows. The season premiered October 17.

=== Home media ===
The season was made available for streaming on Netflix in late May 2018, soon after the season finale aired. It was released on Blu-ray on August 28, 2018.

== Reception ==
=== Ratings ===
Viewership and ratings per episode of The Flash season 4
No.	Title	Air date	Rating/share (18–49)	Viewers (millions)	DVR (18–49)	DVR viewers (millions)	Total (18–49)	Total viewers (millions)
1	"The Flash Reborn"	October 10, 2017	1.1/4	2.84	0.7	1.92	1.8	4.77
2	"Mixed Signals"	October 17, 2017	0.9/4	2.54	0.8	1.82	1.7	4.36
3	"Luck Be a Lady"	October 24, 2017	1.0/4	2.62	0.8	1.84	1.8	4.46
4	"Elongated Journey Into Night"	October 31, 2017	0.7/3	1.99	0.7	1.79	1.4	3.79
5	"Girls Night Out"	November 7, 2017	0.9/4	2.38	0.8	1.84	1.7	4.22
6	"When Harry Met Harry..."	November 14, 2017	1.0/4	2.46	0.7	1.83	1.7	4.29
7	"Therefore I Am"	November 21, 2017	0.8/3	2.20	0.8	2.08	1.6	4.28
8	"Crisis on Earth-X, Part 3"	November 28, 2017	1.0/4	2.82	0.7	1.83	1.7	4.64
9	"Don't Run"	December 5, 2017	0.8/3	2.22	0.6	1.45	1.4	3.67
10	"The Trial of the Flash"	January 16, 2018	0.8/3	2.51	0.7	1.55	1.5	4.06
11	"The Elongated Knight Rises"	January 23, 2018	0.7/3	2.12	0.7	1.69	1.4	3.81
12	"Honey, I Shrunk Team Flash"	January 30, 2018	0.9/3	2.60	0.8	1.84	1.7	4.43
13	"True Colors"	February 6, 2018	0.8/3	2.28	0.9	2.00	1.7	4.28
14	"Subject 9"	February 27, 2018	0.7/3	2.12	0.8	1.86	1.5	3.98
15	"Enter Flashtime"	March 6, 2018	0.7/3	2.04	0.8	1.83	1.5	3.87
16	"Run, Iris, Run"	March 13, 2018	0.7/3	2.09	0.7	1.58	1.4	3.67
17	"Null and Annoyed"	April 10, 2018	0.6/2	1.82	0.7	1.64	1.3	3.47
18	"Lose Yourself"	April 17, 2018	0.7/3	1.88	0.6	1.54	1.3	3.43
19	"Fury Rogue"	April 24, 2018	0.6/2	1.90	0.7	1.61	1.3	3.51
20	"Therefore She Is"	May 1, 2018	0.6/2	1.70	0.8	1.62	1.4	3.31
21	"Harry and the Harrisons"	May 8, 2018	0.7/3	1.74	0.6	1.52	1.3	3.26
22	"Think Fast"	May 15, 2018	0.7/3	1.93	0.6	1.40	1.3	3.30
23	"We Are the Flash"	May 22, 2018	0.8/4	2.16	0.7	1.57	1.5	3.73

=== Critical response ===
The review aggregator website Rotten Tomatoes reported an 80% approval rating with an average rating of 6.95/10 based on 221 reviews. The website's consensus reads, "After an unsteady turn in season three, The Flash returns to its roots with a fourth season packed with humor, spectacle, and a whole lot of heart."

Reviewing the first two episodes of the season, Allison Keene writing for Collider, felt the premiere "wipes the slate clean, fixing a lot of the issues that plagued the end of the last season, and setting up a much more toned-down storyline. Most importantly, it's brought back some fun." She added that with a "streamlined team," the core characters now have time to interact and have meaningful plot lines. On the second episode, Keene described it as "truly a delight" with the show taking "the time to focus on character relationships, and not just romantic relationships" and each character "feeling like a refreshed version of themselves, with new narrative purpose". She also highlighted the setup of the Thinker "as an Alchemy-like villain who manipulates evil metas into the Flash's path as part of some kind of masterplan", saying "The Flash is a series that truly works best as a procedural, with the team finding creative ways to bring down Villains of the Week."

In reviewing the finale, IGN's Jesse Schedeen gave the episode "We Are the Flash" a rating of 4.6/10, opining that, "As troubled as the series has been this year, it's disappointing but unsurprising to see The Flash's fourth season end on such a bland note." Mike Cecchini of Den of Geek! similarly assigned the episode a rating of 2.5/5. In his review, Cecchini felt that the finale was "the weakest season finale [The Flash] has ever produced," and that, "despite several high points, wasn't really enough to salvage the season." In a more positive review from The A.V. Club, Scott Von Doviak gave the finale a B+, praising the light tone and character moments, while adding that "None of this can make up for the long stretches of mediocrity this year, but at least it doesn't leave me with a bad taste in my mouth."

=== Accolades ===
Collider ranked The Flash the second-best superhero series of 2017.

Awards and nominations for The Flash season 4
Year	Award	Category	Nominee(s)	Result	Ref.
2018	BMI Film, TV & Visual Media Awards	BMI Network Television Music Award	Nathaniel Blume and Blake Neely	Won	
2018	Kids' Choice Awards	Favorite TV Actor	Grant Gustin	Nominated	
2018	Kids' Choice Awards	Favorite TV Show	The Flash	Nominated	
2018	MTV Movie & TV Awards	Best Hero	Grant Gustin	Nominated	
2018	Saturn Awards	Best Guest-Starring Performance on Television	Hartley Sawyer	Nominated	
2018	Saturn Awards	Best Superhero Television Series	The Flash	Won	
2018	Saturn Awards	Best Supporting Actress on a Television Series	Candice Patton	Nominated	
2018	Teen Choice Awards	Choice Action TV Actor	Grant Gustin	Won	
2018	Teen Choice Awards	Choice Action TV Actress	Danielle Panabaker	Nominated	
2018	Teen Choice Awards	Choice Action TV Actress	Candice Patton	Nominated	
2018	Teen Choice Awards	Choice Action TV Show	The Flash	Won	
2018	Teen Choice Awards	Choice TV Ship	Grant Gustin and Candice Patton	Nominated	
2019	Leo Awards	Best Guest Performance by a Male in a Dramatic Series	Paul McGillion (for "True Colors")	Nominated	
2019	Leo Awards	Best Visual Effects in a Dramatic Series	Armen V. Kevorkian, Joshua Spivack, Marc Lougee, Shirak Agresta, Andranik Taranyan (for "We Are the Flash")	Won	
