= Eobard Thawne (Arrowverse) =

Character in the Arrowverse

- Arrowverse character
- Tom Cavanagh as Eobard Thawne / Reverse-Flash in The CW's Superhero Fight Club promotional video
- First appearance: "Pilot"; The Flash; October 7, 2014
- Last appearance: "A New World, Part Four"; The Flash; May 24, 2023
- Based on: Eobard Thawne by: John Broome; Carmine Infantino
- Adapted by: Greg Berlanti; Andrew Kreisberg; Geoff Johns
- Portrayed by: Tom Cavanagh; Matt Letscher; Other Victor Garber (as Martin Stein); Sean MacLean (as Jack Swigert)

In-universe information
- Aliases: Reverse-Flash; Harrison Wells; Man in Yellow; Dark Flash; The Flash (alternate timeline)
- Species: Metahuman
- Occupation: Criminal; Physicist; Director of S.T.A.R. Labs
- Family: Eddie Thawne (ancestor)
- Spouses: Iris West (fiancée; alternate timeline)

Eobard Thawne, also known as the Reverse-Flash, is a character in The CW's Arrowverse media franchise. Based on the DC Comics supervillain of the same name, he is primarily portrayed by Tom Cavanagh and Matt Letscher. Letscher played the character's original likeness, while Cavanagh portrayed him in the form of Harrison Wells. Thawne is introduced and featured most prominently in the television series The Flash, though he has also appeared in spin-off shows and crossover events set in the shared fictional universe.

As in the comics, Thawne is depicted as a scientist-turned-metahuman criminal speedster from the future and the archenemy of Barry Allen / The Flash. He originally idolized the Flash and replicated the accident that gave him his powers, but became obsessed with ruining his life upon learning that he was destined to become his greatest enemy—the Reverse-Flash. After traveling back in time in an attempt to kill the Flash as a child, Thawne inadvertently strands himself in the 21st century and is forced to orchestrate the Flash's creation to return to his own time period. Though he is defeated by the Flash, he returns to torment him numerous times, which has brought him into conflict with other heroes including Green Arrow, Supergirl, and the Legends of Tomorrow.

== Character biography ==
=== Origins ===
Born in the year 2151, Professor Eobard Thawne idolized a superhero speedster known as the Flash. He replicated the accident behind the Flash's powers and inadvertently tapped into a "negative" version of the Speed Force. Thawne grew bitter and jealous when the Flash, having traveled through time, saved a crowd that he had intended to rescue and, upon learning that he was destined to become the Flash's greatest enemy, grew obsessed with ruining his life as the Reverse-Flash.

=== Early battles with the Flash ===
The Reverse-Flash and the Flash battled each other for many years, with neither of them ever prevailing. Thawne eventually learns of the Flash's secret identity—Barry Allen—and travels back in time to the year 2000 to kill Barry as a child. He then encounters a version of Barry from the year 2023 who warns him of the potential consequences of his actions, but Thawne refuses to listen and continues his attempt to kill Barry's younger self. When his plan fails due to Barry's interference, Thawne kills Nora Allen and frames Henry Allen instead, hoping that a personal tragedy will prevent the Flash existing. In doing so, Thawne inadvertently severs his own connection to the Negative Speed Force and strands himself in the 21st century.

=== Creating the Flash ===
Thawne murders and assumes the identity and genetic appearance of Dr. Harrison Wells to found S.T.A.R. Labs in Central City, spending the next fourteen years building a particle accelerator to empower the Flash apparently ahead of schedule. "Wells", along with Caitlin Snow and Cisco Ramon, mentors Barry in defeating metahuman criminals caused by the particle accelerator explosion. Thawne pushes Barry into getting faster with the goal of using Barry's pure connection to the Speed Force to return to his own time period. To that end, Thawne also taunts and bests Barry as a tachyon-enhanced speedster—initially referred to as the "Man in Yellow" before he is dubbed the Reverse-Flash by Cisco.

After Thawne's secret is discovered, Barry captures him with the help of Oliver Queen, Ronnie Raymond and Martin Stein. Thawne offers Barry a chance to travel back in time to save Nora in exchange for a time machine to return to the future once the Speed Force wormhole is open, but Barry ultimately refuses and destroys Thawne's Time Sphere. Before Thawne can kill Barry, his ancestor, police detective Eddie Thawne, shoots himself which seemingly erases Thawne from existence, but not before reverting him to his original likeness. A flash drive is found containing Thawne's will that bequeaths S.T.A.R. Labs to Barry and also includes a video-recorded confession which allows for Henry's exoneration.

=== Return ===
Thawne survives his erasure following Eddie's sacrifice due to his connection to the Negative Speed Force, which renders him immune to timeline changes. As the Dark Flash, he allies with Dark Arrow and Overgirl of the Nazi-dominated Earth-X to invade Earth-1. During the final battle, Barry defeats Thawne, but spares his life which allows him to speed off while his allies are killed.

=== Imprisonment in 2049 ===
In 2034, Thawne is captured and imprisoned in Iron Heights Penitentiary, where he is routinely tortured by a corrupt prison guard while a dagger that had belonged to the metahuman serial killer Cicada dampens his super-speed. In 2049, Nora West-Allen seeks Thawne's help. Thawne becomes Nora's mentor and claims that he seeks to create a more noble legacy for himself before he is executed for his crimes. However, he actually plans to destroy Cicada's dagger and escape Iron Heights so he sends Nora to travel back in time and help Barry defeat Cicada, ultimately resulting in the dagger transported to the Mirrorverse which frees him moments before his execution. He briefly fights Barry, Nora, and Team Flash before Nora begins fading from existence because of the changes in the timeline while Thawne makes his escape.

=== New multiverse ===
Following the multiversal Crisis, Thawne turns into a being of negative tachyons and is fused with Harrison Nash Wells, a 'repository' for the consciousness of every version of Wells. Thawne takes control of Nash's body and tries to reconnect to the Negative Speed Force, but Team Flash expels him from Nash's body which leaves him without a physical form.

Barry and Iris West-Allen later have the Speed Force reconstitute Thawne's corporeal form in exchange for his aid in subduing Godspeed. After he incapacitates Godspeed, Thawne double-crosses Barry and attempts to kill his nemesis, but he is easily defeated. Seeing that Barry is now faster than he is, Thawne vows vengeance and speeds off.

=== Armageddon and final showdown ===
To seize control of Barry's life, Thawne uses the Negative Still Force to alter the timeline and create a "Reverse-Flashpoint" reality in which he is the Flash and Barry is the Reverse-Flash. However, Barry reconnects to the Speed Force to avert the impending "Armageddon" and restores the timeline, resulting in Thawne beginning to fade from existence. To save Thawne's life, Barry severs his connection to the Negative Speed Force and has him remanded into A.R.G.U.S. custody.

Incarcerated in a supermax prison on Lian Yu, Thawne is approached by the Negative Still Force, which seeks to restore him as the Negative Speed Force's avatar. Thawne is aged to death and Iris is sacrificed so that he can be "resurrected" in his time remnant's body, allowing him to be the Reverse-Flash once again.

Thawne gets displaced, along with Zoom, Savitar and Godspeed, by the Negative Speed Force (via Eddie) for a showdown against Team Flash. Thawne attempts to kill Chester P. Runk at S.T.A.R. Labs, but is thwarted by Allegra Garcia and his time displacement is undone when Eddie seizes his power.

Thawne absorbs the Negative Forces of Nature's power which transforms him into their avatar. Barry absorbs the Positive Forces of Nature's power to be Thawne's equal, and the two speedsters engage in a fight that threatens to bring about Armageddon. Barry realizes that neither can win, tricking Thawne into unleashing his full power, only to redirect the negative energy back into him which destroys Thawne for good.

== Other versions ==
=== Time remnant ===
Barry travels back in time to save Nora from Thawne after Henry's death, creating an alternate "Flashpoint" timeline in which Thawne is imprisoned. Barry later realizes this mistake and allows Thawne to kill Nora to restore the timeline.

Afterwards, Thawne enters a nullified state of existence as a time remnant, causing him to be hunted by the Black Flash. Seeking to cement his existence, Thawne forms a legion of villains to locate the fabled Spear of Destiny and rewrite reality to their whims. Thawne and his allies are initially successful before the Legends travel back in time to depower the artifact, causing Thawne to be vaporized by the Black Flash. The Speed Force later revives the time remnant (albeit powerless) to defend a certain fixed point, but Thawne aids the Legends before he is killed by Sara Lance's android doppelgänger and Nate Heywood's android doppelgänger gets tricked in his place as the fixed point's defender.

As a reward for his sacrifice in protecting the timeline, Thawne's time remnant is offered an opportunity for redemption when the Speed Force resurrects him without his memories. Feeling inexplicably compelled to be a speedster, he works with Fast Track Labs' CEO Meena Dhawan to create an artificial Speed Force device. Thawne falls in love with Meena and gives up his dream when he uses the device to save Meena's life, inadvertently connecting Meena to the Negative Speed Force. Thawne works with Barry to free Meena from its influence and works alongside them against the Negative Forces who ultimately sacrificed him so that his original doppelgänger can be restored in his body.

== Concept and development ==
On February 10, 2014, Tom Cavanagh was set to join The Flash as Harrison Wells. To play Harrison Wells, Cavanagh opted to homage Apple Inc. founder Steve Jobs by dressing in black to make clear his character was someone with a visionary vision like Jobs. The producers of the show said the following about the character: 'There's obviously more that meets the eye when you see Harrison Wells. ... His motivations are a big mystery, and tracking that through has been a very interesting ride with Mr. Cavanagh.' In episode fifteen, Cavanagh was revealed to be playing Eobard Thawne. Regarding this, co-creator Andrew Kreisberg said the character Eddie Thawne served as a red herring so that comic book fans would suspect the latter is the Reverse-Flash because of their same surname without realizing it is actually Wells. Episode seventeen featured the debut of Matt Letscher in the role, which shocked viewers. The executive producers had not planned this twist from the start, with Kreisberg saying, 'We were talking about, 'well what if Wells wasn't Wells? What if he stole Wells' body?' Letscher was offered the role in December 2014, being cast due to his previous collaboration with Kreisberg and Greg Berlanti in the ABC television series Eli Stone. Cavanagh and Letscher had discussions about playing the character, with Letscher learning how Cavanagh pronounced their character's last name and taking notes by looking at past episodes on how the latter plays Thawne in public and then when Thawne is alone with Gideon, taking inspiration from Cavanagh's intensity and stillness. Cavanagh would continue to primarily portray Thawne on The Flash, while Letscher subsequently played a time-displaced version of the character on The Flash and Legends of Tomorrow.

For the "Crisis on Earth-X" crossover event, only Cavanagh returned to play Thawne; Letscher confirmed on his Twitter account that he was not asked to return. Letscher was similarly not contacted to reprise the role for the fifth season of The Flash, a decision showrunner Todd Helbing credited for Cavanagh's Thawne making sense in a "weird, time travel way" and being applicable to the season's "legacy" theme. Cavanagh would later be reported to appear as Thawne in the "Crisis on Infinite Earths" crossover event, which aligned with the allusion in the first season of The Flash that Thawne would have a role in a potential adaptation of Marv Wolfman's and George Pérez's 1985 comic book storyline of the same name. However, Thawne ultimately did not feature in the crossover. In an interview with TVLine, executive producer Marc Guggenheim attributed the decision of not having Thawne included to the newspaper headlines hinting at his involvement in the show's first season having been written by showrunners, like Kreisberg, no longer involved in the shows or the crossover, plus Thawne's already prominent presences in previous crossovers like "Elseworlds", citing Thawne's exclusion as a "hard story choice" to make given his fondness for the character.

While the character has cheated death numerous times in the Arrowverse, Thawne's demise was intended to be permanent in the season eight finale of The Flash, which was written to serve as a series finale should the show not be renewed. When the series was renewed for a ninth and final season, however, both Cavanagh and Letscher's versions of the character returned in the four-part series finale. Letscher was brought back for the first part, an episode that closes the time loop where Thawne gets trapped in the past, while Cavanagh reprised his role in the fourth and final episode. Eric Wallace (showrunner of The Flash since 2019) stated that Barry Allen's story had to end with one final confrontation with his archenemy and that bringing the Reverse-Flash back for the series finale was always part of the show's plan.

== Characterization ==
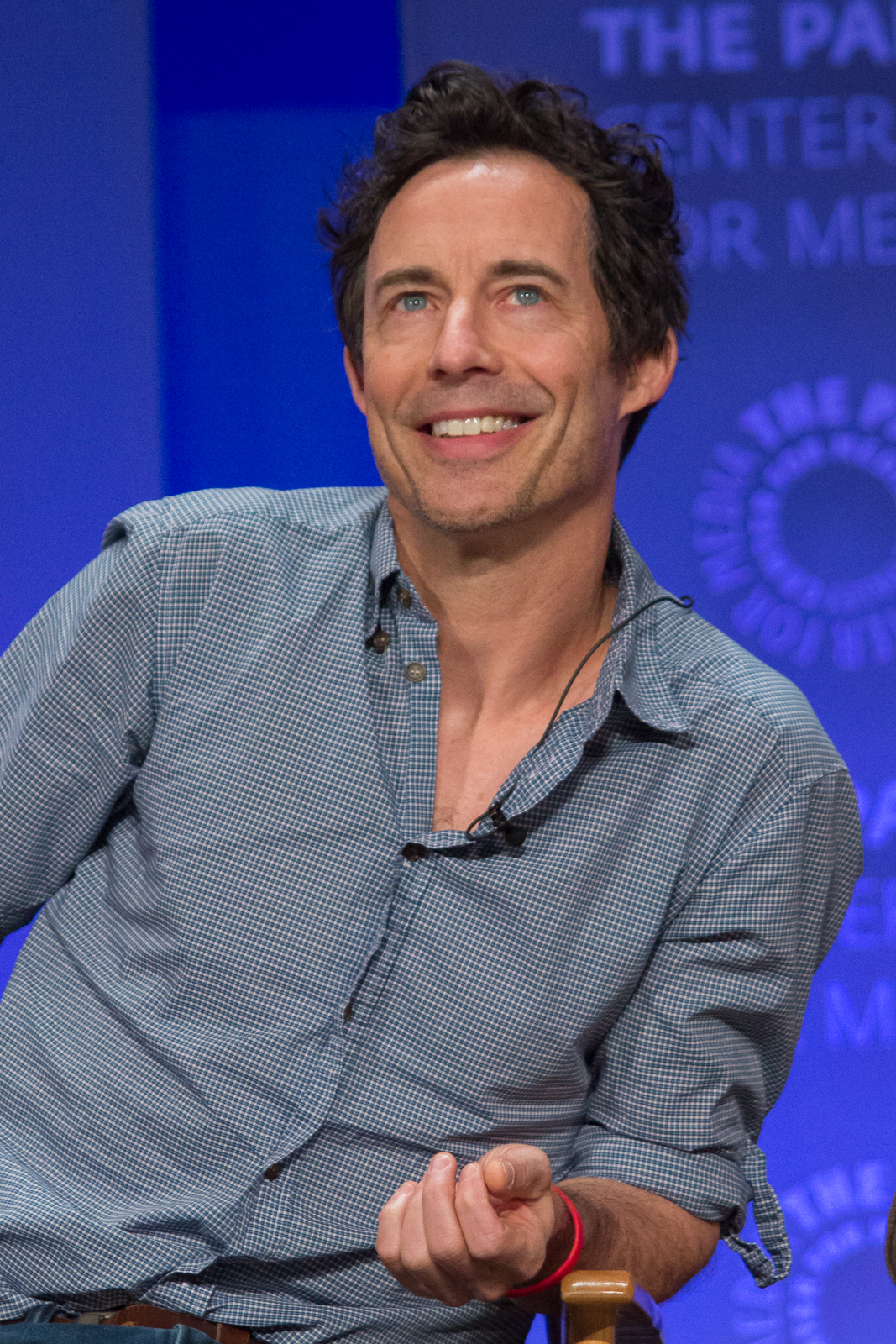
Tom Cavanagh (pictured in 2015) primarily portrayed Eobard Thawne on The Flash.

=== Portrayal ===
Cavanagh has stated many times that he enjoys playing Eobard Thawne as the character is interesting, complex, and challenging. When speaking with the Television Academy about playing the character, Cavanagh said: 'The Reverse-Flash has what I like to a call timeless way of speaking. He doesn't use colloquialisms from 2016, he's a little more formal, and he takes joy in destroying people. He has a larger perspective because he comes from 100-plus years in the future and has seen it all. It's easy to play a character like that. He's the arch in arch-villain.' He also sat down with Rolling Stone to discuss his supervillain voice in which he said: "If you're doing it right, you can be charismatic, you can win people over, and you can have so much fun. You build a cage and then you just rattle that cage more than the leading guy can a lot". Kreisberg insisted that Thawne was not entirely evil because his fatherly affection for Cisco was genuine, and "he has a reason for doing what he's doing and he has an agenda and he thinks of himself as the hero ... bad people are capable of incredible amounts of kindness and generosity".

=== Costume ===
When asked by the Television Academy about wearing the Reverse-Flash suit, Cavanagh replied with "That's a lot of what acting is. Often times, you're tapping into the things you did as a youth. You pretended. A lot of us pretended to be Batman, to be our favorite super-hero. A lot of times, you pretended to have the power of imagination at your side. And the first time you put it on, the cameras are rolling, and off you go at superspeed. I've gotten to do some great, great thrilling stunts in the suit. It is a dream come true. I understand that it's a job, and I'm getting paid, but the second that a director yells, "Action", all that disappears, and you're a guy in a supersuit. It's extremely thrilling. I've said before that I wish that anyone who is a legitimate comic book fan could have this opportunity. It really feels like a privilege". Cavanagh also said "I benefited from all the trial and error that went into that. ... I think they did a marvelous job with the suit, I'm always very flattered and honored to put it on," when speaking with Access Hollywood.

== In other media ==
- Cavanagh reprised his role as the Reverse-Flash in The CW's Superhero Fight Club promotional video, which was released in April 2015.
- Cavanagh's portrayal of the Reverse-Flash was added as a playable character in the mobile version of the video game Injustice: Gods Among Us.
- Cavanagh reprised his role and voiced Thawne masquerading as Wells in the Robot Chicken episode "Ants on a Hamburger".

== Reception ==
=== Critical response ===
Tom Cavanagh's portrayal of Eobard Thawne has received critical praise since the first season. Erik Kain from Forbes stated that Cavanagh "is uncanny, a perfect fit for the ominous yet likable villain. All his lines and statements connect with audiences precisely because of how well Cavanagh pulls off the role, and how well that role is written". Collider chose Tom Cavanagh as the Best TV Actor of the Week on May 18, 2015. Rotten Tomatoes ranked Cavanagh's Reverse-Flash as the Scariest Character on Comic Book Television as of November 2019. Chancellor Agard from Entertainment Weekly wrote "No matter how many ups and downs The Flash has had over its run, it has never faltered when it comes to its characterization of Thawne".

=== Accolades ===
The Flash's Eobard Thawne was ranked number 35 on Rolling Stone's list of the 40 Greatest TV Villains of All Time. He also topped Entertainment Weekly's list of 20 "best" villains on superhero TV in 2015, and was included on Collider's list of Best TV Villains of 2015. Cavanagh received an IGN Awards nomination for Best TV Villain for his portrayal of the character in The Flash. He was also nominated for Choice TV Villain at the 2015 Teen Choice Awards. Screen Rant's Jason Berman ranked Cavanagh fifth on his 2016 list 20 Best Actors in the Arrowverse. The entertainment website Collider chose Tom Cavanagh as the Best TV Actor of the Week on May 18, 2015.
