= Crisis on Earth-X =

Arrowverse crossover event

- Arrowverse crossover event
- Promotional poster and home media cover
- Story by: Andrew Kreisberg; Marc Guggenheim

Part 1: Supergirl
- Episode title: "Crisis on Earth-X, Part 1"
- Episode no.: Season 3 Episode 8
- Directed by: Larry Teng
- Teleplay by: Robert Rovner; Jessica Queller
- Production code: T13.20658
- Original air date: November 27, 2017

Episode chronology
← Previous "Wake Up"	Next → "Reign"
- Supergirl season 3

Part 2: Arrow
- Episode title: "Crisis on Earth-X, Part 2"
- Episode no.: Season 6 Episode 8
- Directed by: James Bamford
- Teleplay by: Wendy Mericle; Ben Sokolowski
- Production code: T27.13458
- Original air date: November 27, 2017

Episode chronology
← Previous "Thanksgiving"	Next → "Irreconcilable Differences"
- Arrow season 6

Part 3: The Flash
- Episode title: "Crisis on Earth-X, Part 3"
- Episode no.: Season 4 Episode 8
- Directed by: Dermott Downs
- Teleplay by: Todd Helbing
- Production code: T27.13408
- Original air date: November 28, 2017

Episode chronology
← Previous "Therefore I Am"	Next → "Don't Run"
- The Flash season 4

Part 4: Legends of Tomorrow
- Episode title: "Crisis on Earth-X, Part 4"
- Episode no.: Season 3 Episode 8
- Directed by: Gregory Smith
- Teleplay by: Phil Klemmer; Keto Shimizu
- Production code: T13.20608
- Original air date: November 28, 2017

Episode chronology
← Previous "Welcome to the Jungle"	Next → "Beebo the God of War"
- Legends of Tomorrow season 3

Crossover chronology
- Preceded by: Invasion!
- Followed by: Elseworlds

"Crisis on Earth-X" is the fourth Arrowverse crossover event, featuring episodes of Supergirl, Arrow, The Flash, and Legends of Tomorrow on The CW. The crossover began on November 27, 2017, with Supergirl and Arrow, and concluded on November 28, with The Flash and Legends of Tomorrow. In the crossover, Barry Allen and Iris West's friends visit Central City for their wedding, only for the ceremony to be interrupted by interlopers from the parallel universe of Earth-X, where the Axis powers claimed victory in World War II.

Development for a crossover of the four series began in December 2016 after the release of the previous crossover, "Invasion!". The premise and title of the crossover were revealed in September 2017 as production on the episodes began; elements from then upcoming animated web series Freedom Fighters: The Ray were part of the crossover, including the live-action appearance of Raymond Terrill / The Ray, the Freedom Fighters, and the New Reichsmen.

"Crisis on Earth-X" was met with critical acclaim with it being widely considered an improvement on the previous crossovers. The crossover was viewed by an average audience of 2.71 million viewers per episode. A subsequent crossover aired the following year, titled "Elseworlds".

== Plot ==
=== Part 1 ===
A Nazi regime rules the parallel world of Earth-X, where an archer known as Dark Arrow is the Führer and leader of the cabal known as the New Reichsmen. He seizes a temporal gateway from the Freedom Fighters, which enables travel to other universes. On Earth-1, Barry Allen and Iris West's friends, including Kara Danvers and Alex Danvers from Earth-38, come to Central City for Barry and Iris's wedding. Harry Wells, Cisco Ramon, and Caitlin Snow develop a serum to separate the Firestorm matrix from Martin Stein and Jefferson Jackson. However, Jefferson is reluctant to give up being Firestorm, while Stein is thrilled at the prospect of being able to live a normal life with his family. Oliver Queen re-proposes to Felicity Smoak, but she is hesitant about marrying him. The wedding ceremony is interrupted by invaders from Earth-X led by Dark Arrow, his Kryptonian wife Overgirl, and the Earth-X analog of Prometheus. After Alex and Sara Lance capture Prometheus, the Nazis retreat. Dark Arrow and Overgirl, who are doppelgängers of Oliver and Kara respectively, discuss their next step with Eobard Thawne, Barry's speedster nemesis who was previously presumed dead.

=== Part 2 ===
In S.T.A.R. Labs, Prometheus reveals himself as Tommy Merlyn's Earth-X doppelgänger, and taunts Oliver before taking a suicide pill out of loyalty to the Führer. Harry reveals that, through his exploration of the multiverse, he discovered that Earth-X is a dystopian world where the Allied forces lost World War II. Dark Arrow, Overgirl, and Thawne steal an experimental sub-light generator, the Prism, from a research company. Oliver's team, along with Harry, Killer Frost, Cisco, and Mick Rory, are held captive at S.T.A.R. Labs after the Nazi forces occupy it. Oliver, Barry, Sara, Martin, Jefferson, and Alex are taken to a concentration camp on Earth-X, while Kara is moved to S.T.A.R. Labs. Overgirl is dying from disproportionate solar irradiance in her heart, and Dark Arrow plans to use the Prism, powered by S.T.A.R. Labs' particle accelerator, to create artificial red sunlight that can weaken both Karas' invulnerability, allowing Thawne to transplant Kara's heart to Overgirl.

=== Part 3 ===
In the concentration camp, the heroes are rescued from execution at the hands of SS-Sturmbannführer Quentin Lance by Ray Terrill and Leo Snart, Leonard Snart's doppelgänger. Thawne prepares to operate on both Overgirl and Kara, and Iris and Felicity work to rescue their friends at S.T.A.R. Labs. General Winn Schott, the commander of the Freedom Fighters, is determined to strand Dark Arrow and Overgirl on Earth-1 by destroying the temporal gateway. While posing as Dark Arrow, Oliver discovers that the Nazis possess a doomsday device in the form of a timeship called Wellenreiter, a militarized equivalent of the Legends' Waverider. Oliver allows the timeship to enter Earth-1 to avoid jeopardizing his cover, but he is ultimately exposed when he refuses to kill Felicity's Earth-X doppelgänger, a concentration camp prisoner. The heroes struggle against both the Freedom Fighters' Red Tornado, deployed by Schott as a failsafe, and the Nazi forces, and Martin opens the gateway at the cost of being mortally wounded.

=== Part 4 ===
The heroes return to Earth-1, and Iris, Felicity, Kara, and the others are rescued by the returned heroes and the Waverider crew. Jefferson is also affected by Martin's injuries, so Martin uses the serum to separate the Firestorm matrix, dying from his wounds. Jefferson tells Martin's family of his fate; they, along with the Legends and Barry's team, are devastated by Martin's death. His death spurs the heroes to declare war on Earth-X's Nazi forces. When the Nazis attack Central City, the heroes counter their assault. Harry, at the helm of the Waverider, destroys the Wellenreiter after the heroes disable its shield. Barry spares Thawne and allows him to escape; Thawne vows to return. During the battle with Kara, Overgirl's solar radiation goes nuclear, and Kara carries her into space, where her body explodes, killing her; Oliver, despite giving Dark Arrow a chance to stand down, kills his grief-stricken doppelgänger soon after. After Martin's funeral, Kara and Alex return to Earth-38, Ray returns to Earth-X, and Leo decides to temporarily join the Legends. John Diggle, an ordained minister, officiates Barry and Oliver's weddings with Iris and Felicity, respectively.

== Cast and characters ==
=== Main and recurring ===
Main cast and characters of "Crisis on Earth-X"
Actor	Character	Episode			
Actor	Character	Supergirl	Arrow	The Flash	Legends of Tomorrow
Melissa Benoist	Kara Danvers / Supergirl	Main	Guest	Guest	Guest
Melissa Benoist	Kara Zor-El / Overgirl (Earth-X)	Main	Guest	Guest	Guest
Mehcad Brooks	Guardian (Earth-X)	Main			
Chyler Leigh	Alex Danvers	Main	Guest	Guest	Guest
Jeremy Jordan	Winn Schott	Main			
Jeremy Jordan	Winn Schott (Earth-X)			Guest	
Chris Wood	Mon-El / Mike Matthews	Main			
Stephen Amell	Oliver Queen / Green Arrow	Guest	Main	Guest	Guest
Stephen Amell	Oliver Queen / Dark Arrow (Earth-X)	Guest	Main	Guest	Guest
Victor Garber	Martin Stein / Firestorm	Guest	Guest	Guest	Main
Emily Bett Rickards	Felicity Smoak / Overwatch	Guest	Main	Guest	Guest
Emily Bett Rickards	Felicity Smoak (Earth-X)			Guest	
Caity Lotz	Sara Lance / White Canary	Guest	Guest	Guest	Main
Tom Cavanagh	Harrison "Harry" Wells	Guest	Guest	Main	Guest
Tom Cavanagh	Eobard Thawne / Reverse-Flash	Guest	Guest	Main	Guest
Dominic Purcell	Mick Rory / Heat Wave	Guest	Guest		Main
Candice Patton	Iris West	Guest	Guest	Main	Guest
Franz Drameh	Jefferson "Jax" Jackson / Firestorm	Guest	Guest	Guest	Main
Danielle Panabaker	Caitlin Snow / Killer Frost	Guest	Guest	Main	Guest
Carlos Valdes	Cisco Ramon / Vibe	Guest		Main	Guest
Grant Gustin	Barry Allen / Flash	Guest	Guest	Main	Guest
Echo Kellum	Curtis Holt / Mister Terrific		Main		Guest
Rick Gonzalez	Rene Ramirez / Wild Dog		Main		Guest
Juliana Harkavy	Dinah Drake / Black Canary		Main	Guest	Guest
Frederick Schmidt	Metallo (Earth-X)		(non-speaking appearance)	Guest	(non-speaking appearance)
Wentworth Miller	Leonard "Leo" Snart / Citizen Cold (Earth-X)			Guest	Guest
Russell Tovey	Ray Terrill / The Ray			Guest	Guest
Brandon Routh	Ray Palmer / Atom				Main
Maisie Richardson-Sellers	Amaya Jiwe / Vixen				Main
Amy Louise Pemberton	Gideon (voice)				Main
Tala Ashe	Zari Tomaz				Main
Nick Zano	Nate Heywood / Steel				Main

Only those who appeared in multiple episodes are listed on the table. Despite being credited, Katie McGrath and Odette Annable do not appear in the Supergirl episode, and David Ramsey and Katie Cassidy do not appear in the Arrow episode.

=== Guest ===
==== Supergirl ====
- Jesse L. Martin as Joe West
- Keiynan Lonsdale as Wally West / Kid Flash
- Jessica Parker Kennedy as a caterer (Note: The final episode of the fourth season of The Flash revealed Kennedy's character to be Nora West-Allen, the daughter of Barry and Iris.)
- Danielle Nicolet as Cecile Horton
- Patrick Sabongui as David Singh
- William Katt as the minister

==== Arrow ====
- Colin Donnell as Tommy Merlyn / Prometheus (Earth-X)

==== The Flash ====
- Paul Blackthorne as SS Sturmbannführer Quentin Lance (Earth-X)

==== Legends of Tomorrow ====
- David Ramsey as John Diggle
- Susanna Thompson as the Wellenreiter's A.I. (uncredited)

== Production ==
=== Development and filming ===
Planning for the yearly Arrowverse crossover began in December 2016, with Arrow showrunner Wendy Mericle saying, "We actually sort of do, believe it or not, have a concept for what we want to do for next year's crossover. It's crazy". By February 2017, planning began for a true four-way series crossover. Because each series was renewed for an additional season, the producers could plan production schedules to incorporate the crossover. Executive producer Andrew Kreisberg said, "One of the big things we learned from "Heroes Join Forces", which made "Invasion!" slightly easier, was building in shut-down days, where shows just went dark. The single hardest factor in doing the crossovers is actors' availability because the shows keep going on. You're basically juggling four shows' worth of schedules." That May, Mark Pedowitz, then president of The CW, confirmed that there were no plans to incorporate Black Lightning in the crossover, as it was not part of the Arrowverse at the time and was scheduled to debut in the middle of the 2017–18 television season.

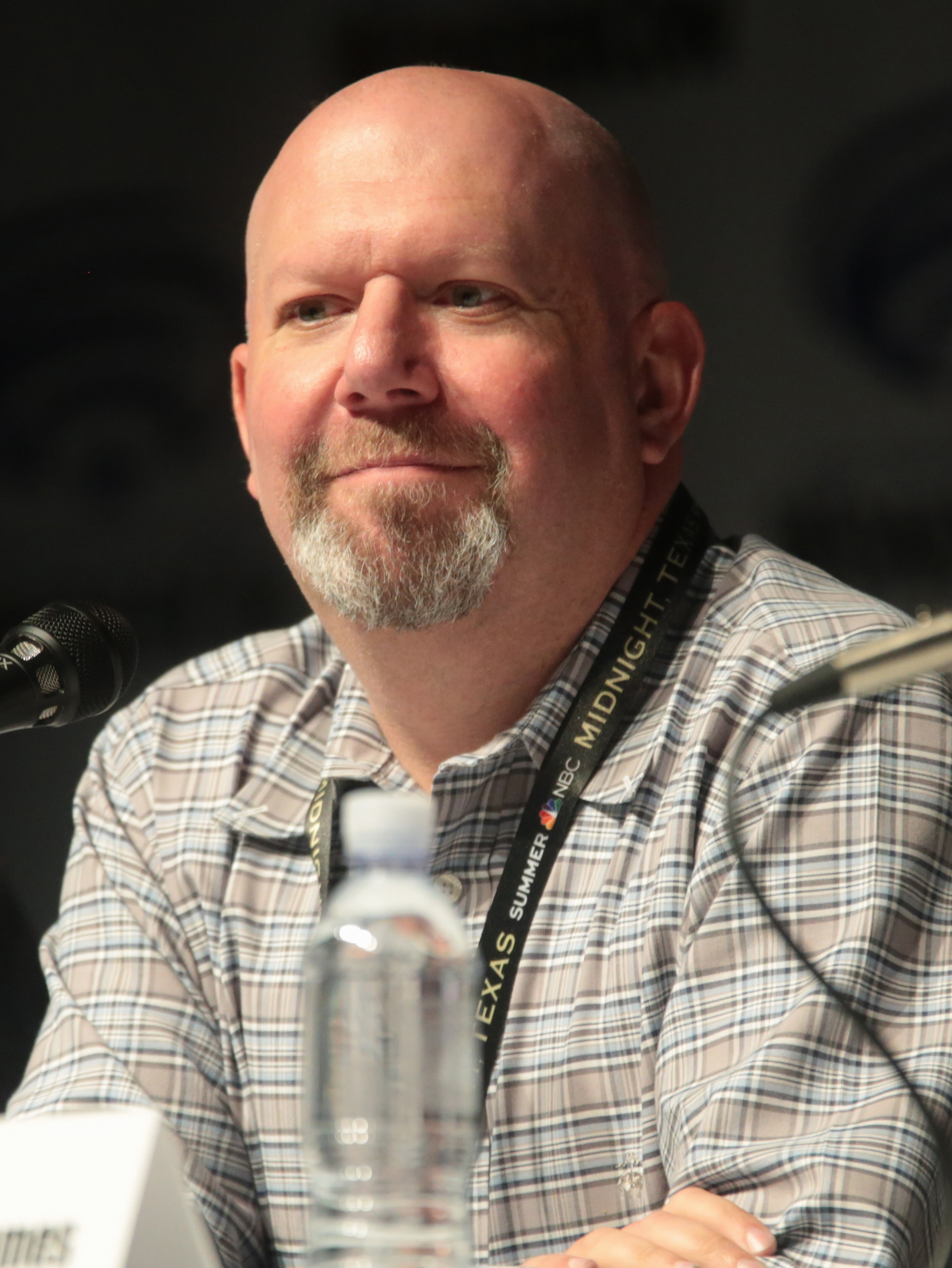
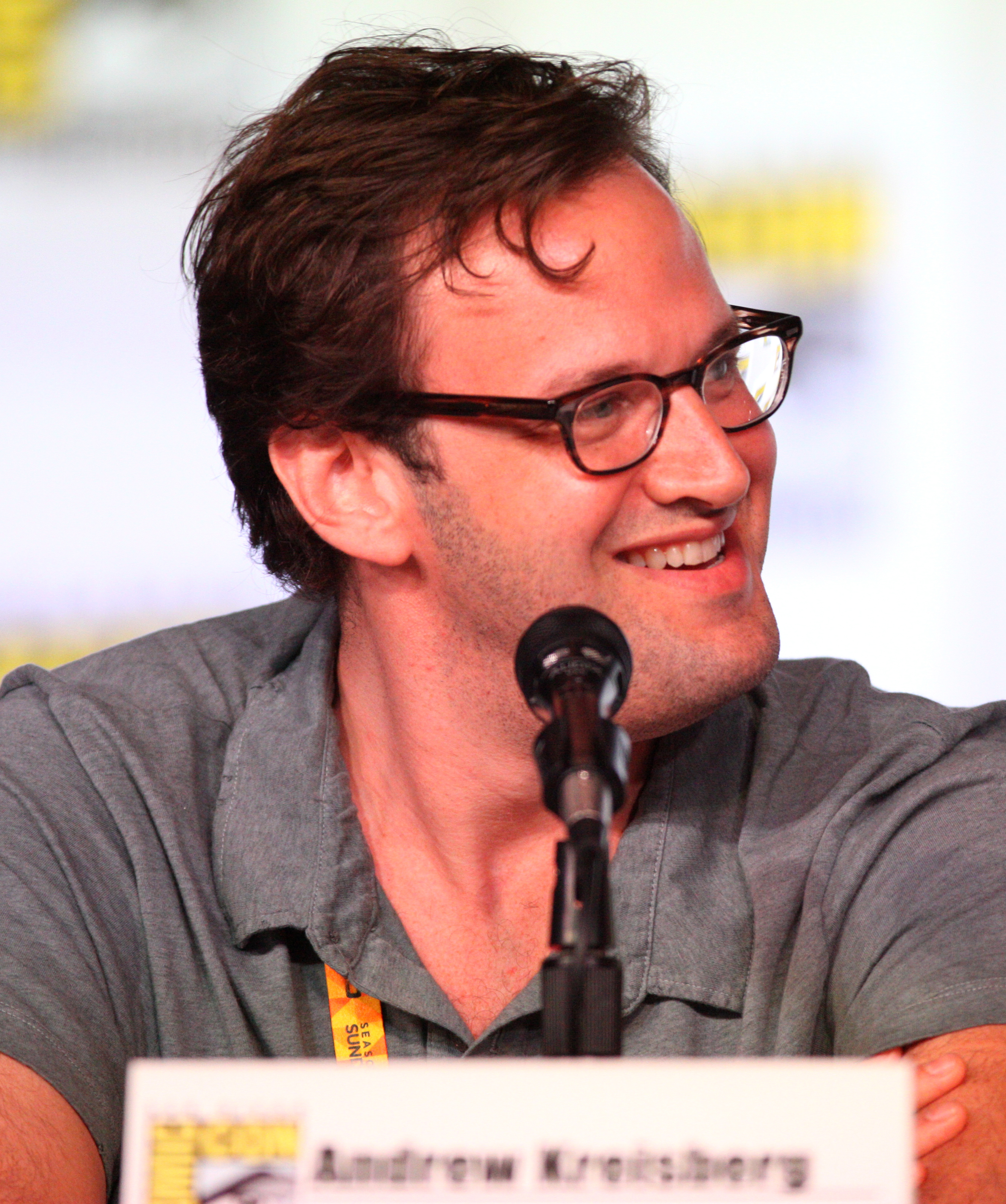
Marc Guggenheim (left) and Andrew Kreisberg (right) wrote the crossover's story.

In June 2017, executive producer Marc Guggenheim noted that it would be hard to top the threat of aliens in "Invasion!", so this crossover would aim to "increase the emotional stakes and the emotional payoffs". In September, it was revealed that the title of the crossover would be "Crisis on Earth-X" and that Russell Tovey as Ray Terrill / The Ray would make his live-action debut in the Arrowverse, ahead of appearing in the animated web series, Freedom Fighters: The Ray, along with other characters and concepts from that series. Guggenheim, who developed Freedom Fighters for CW Seed, felt that employing Earth-X in the crossover due to fitting into the plans of what the showrunners wished to make for a crossover that had the heroes being evil in another world, as they could have made another parallel universe but instead opted to use an idea that had already been implemented. The producers knew from the beginning of the crossover's conception that they wished to have the Arrowverse's heroes be villains in Earth-X. In 2019, Guggenheim called "Crisis on Earth-X" the "gold standard" of the yearly crossovers.

Filming of the four episodes began on September 22, 2017. Supergirl's episode was directed by Larry Teng, Arrow's by James Bamford, The Flash's by Dermott Downs, and Legend of Tomorrow's by Gregory Smith.

=== Writing ===
The crossover's story was conceived by Kreisberg and Guggenheim. The teleplay for Supergirl's episode was written by showrunners Robert Rovner and Jessica Queller, Arrow's by showrunner Wendy Mericle and Ben Sokolowski, The Flash's by showrunner Todd Helbing, and Legends of Tomorrow's by showrunner Phil Klemmer and Keto Shimizu.

In August 2017, Mericle added that the crossover would be "very much rooted in the DCU". At the Television Critics Association press tour in August 2017, Pedowitz said that the crossover would involve romance, with Berlanti adding, "our way of making the show bigger this year was to go even more personal, so it's a big life event for a few different people on the show. There are many life events that happen." Mericle described the story as one where the character of Oliver Queen "explores the question of true love". "Crisis on Earth-X" did wrap up several story arcs including the weddings of Oliver Queen and Barry Allen, Alex Danvers getting over her ex-girlfriend, and Martin Stein leaving the Legends.

In September 2017, in a statement revealing the crossover's title, Guggenheim and Kreisberg said that the crossover was conceived "to be evocative of the annual Justice League/Justice Society [comic book series] crossovers we grew up with and looked forward to as kids".

=== Casting ===
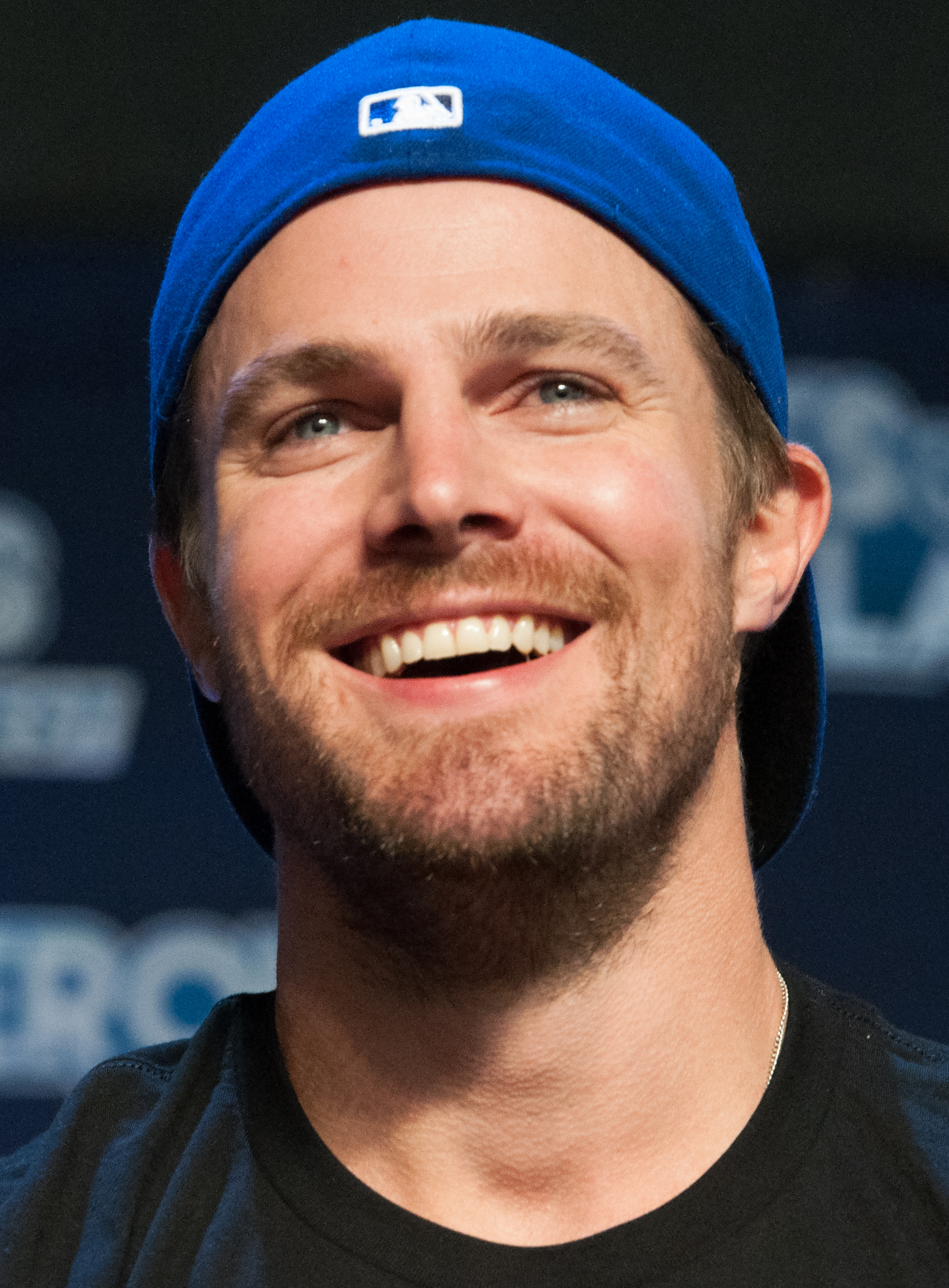
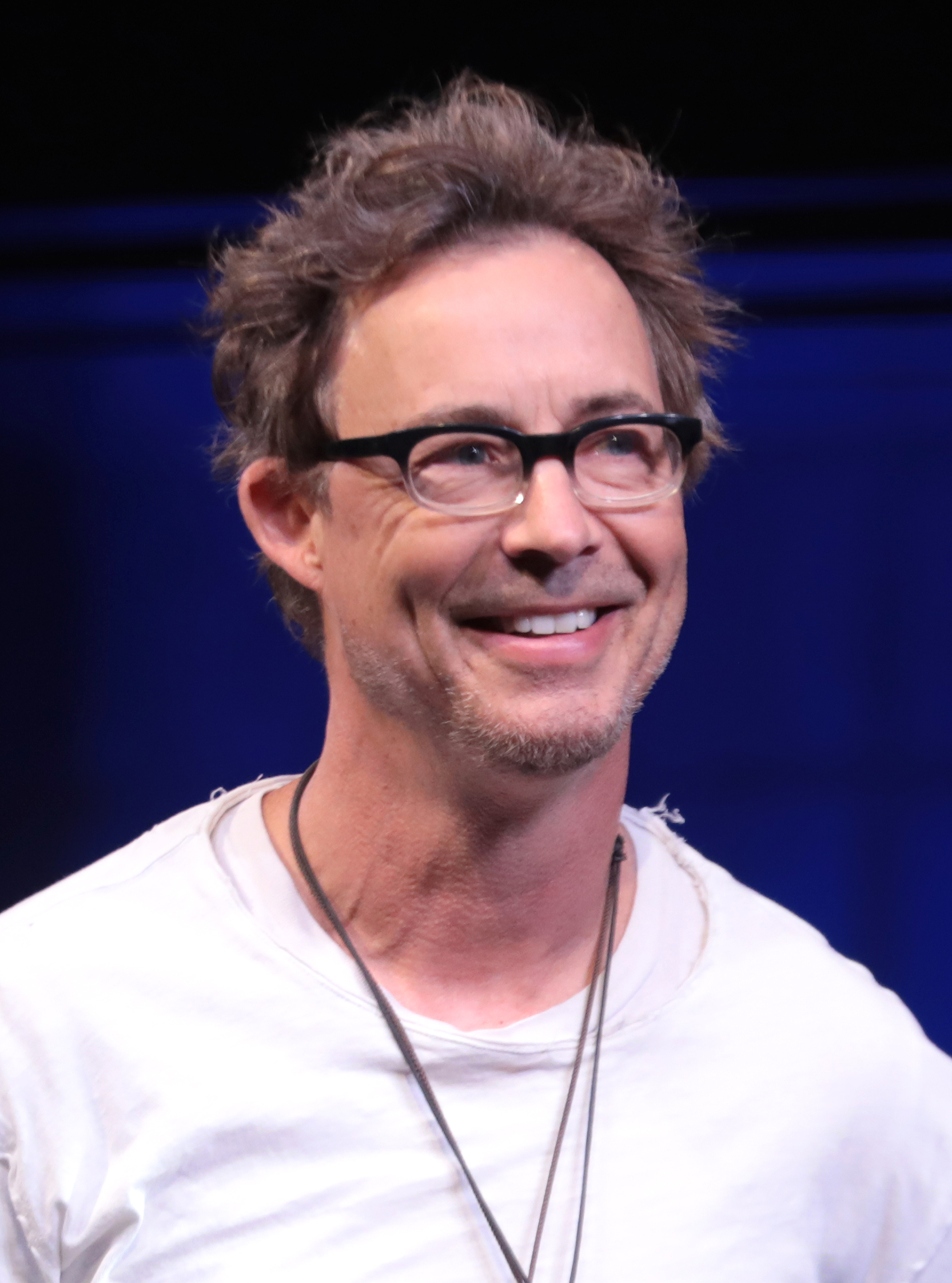
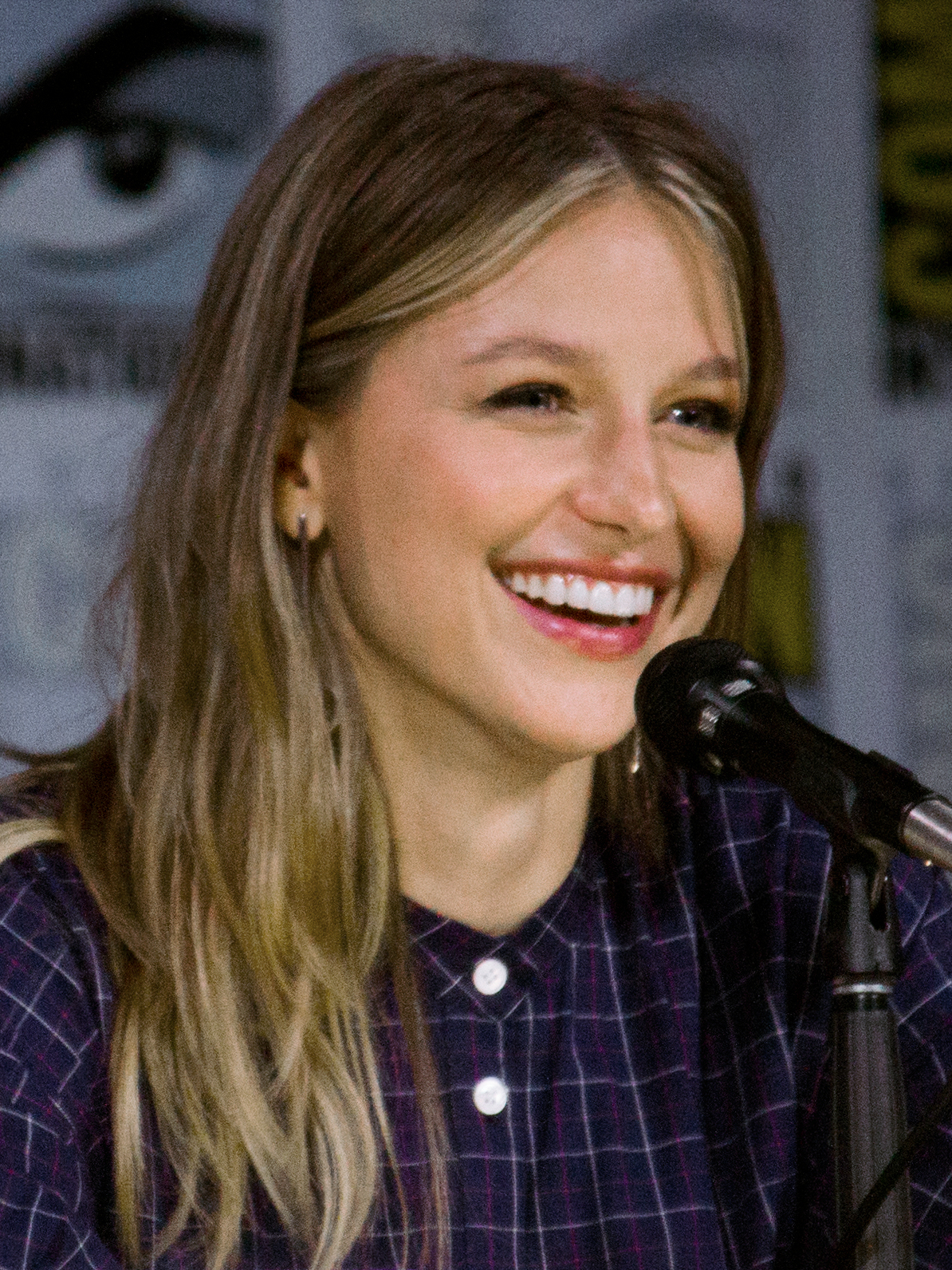
Stephen Amell, Tom Cavanagh, and Melissa Benoist appear as the crossover's main villains.

Several series regulars and recurring characters reprised their respective roles. Supergirl cast members Melissa Benoist, Chyler Leigh, Jeremy Jordan, and Chris Wood star as Kara Zor-El / Supergirl, Winn Schott, and Mon-El. Frederick Schmidt guest stars as Earth-X Metallo. Mehcad Brooks appears the Earth-X version of James Olsen. Arrow cast members Stephen Amell, Emily Bett Rickards, Echo Kellum, Rick Gonzalez, and Juliana Harkavy appear as Oliver Queen / Green Arrow, Felicity Smoak / Overwatch, Curtis Holt / Mister Terrific, Rene Ramirez / Wild Dog, and Dinah Drake / Black Canary.

The Flash cast members Grant Gustin, Candice Patton, Danielle Panabaker, and Carlos Valdes appear as Barry Allen, Iris West, Caitlin Snow / Frost, and Cisco Ramon / Vibe. Tom Cavanagh appears as both Harry Wells and Eobard Thawne / Reverse-Flash. Legends of Tomorrow cast members Victor Garber, Caity Lotz, Dominic Purcell, Franz Drameh, Brandon Routh, Maisie Richardson-Sellers, Amy Pemberton, Tala Ashe and Nick Zano appear as Martin Stein / Firestorm, Sara Lance / White Canary, Mick Rory / Heat Wave, Jefferson "Jax" Jackson / Firestorm, Ray Palmer / Atom, Amaya Jiwe / Vixen, Gideon, Zari Tomaz and Nate Heywood / Steel. Russel Tovey reprises his role as Ray Terrill / The Ray from Freedom Fighters: The Ray.

Part Four is the final episode of Legends of Tomorrow to feature Garber as a series regular, due to him being cast in a revival of the musical Hello, Dolly!. His departure led to Drameh's in the following episode. Prior to the release of "Crisis on Earth-X", David Harewood and Katie McGrath confirmed that their Supergirl characters would not be involved in the crossover.

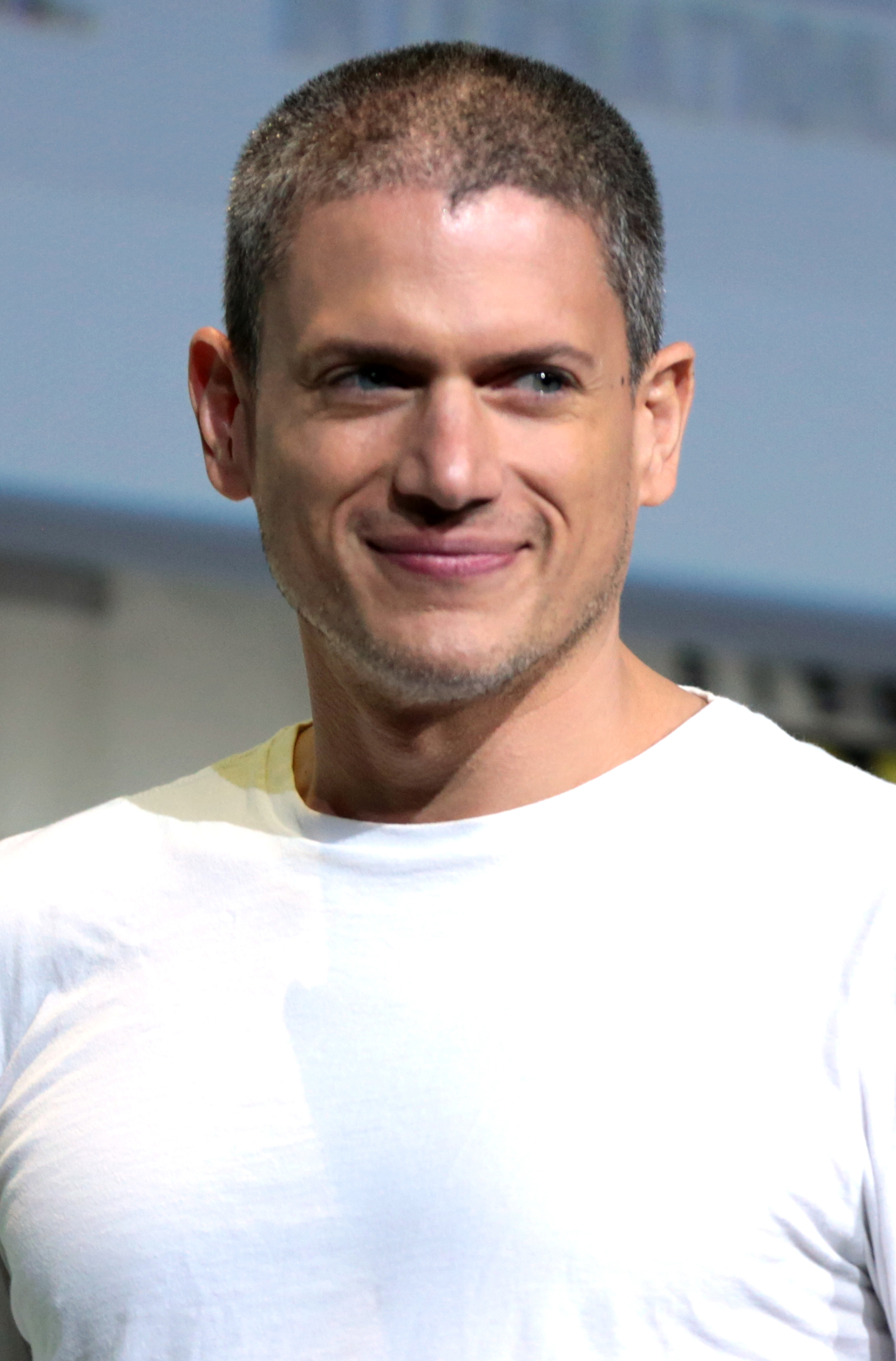
Wentworth Miller appears as the Earth-X version of Leonard Snart.

Guest cast members who appear in one or more parts of the crossover included Jesse L. Martin, Keiynan Lonsdale, Danielle Nicolet, Patrick Sabongui, Colin Donnell, Paul Blackthorne, and David Ramsey reprising their roles as Joe West, Wally West / Kid Flash, Cecile Horton, David Singh, Tommy Merlyn, Quentin Lance, and John Diggle. Donnell and Blackthorne instead played their Earth-X counterparts without appearing as their original versions. Jessica Parker Kennedy appeared as a caterer, later revealed in The Flash season four finale "We Are the Flash" to be Nora West-Allen, and William Katt appeared in part one as the minister who initially tries to marry Barry and Iris. Former Arrow regular Susanna Thompson makes a brief voice only appearance as the Wellenreiter's artificial intelligence. Former Legends of Tomorrow regular Wentworth Miller returned as the Earth-X version of Leonard Snart.

Matt Letscher, who played Thawne in his normal form in The Flash and Legends of Tomorrow, was not asked to return as Thawne for the crossover, allowing Cavanagh to play the role solely. Katie Cassidy was planned to appear as Laurel Lance's Earth-X counterpart Siren-X, but her inclusion was dropped due to the death of her father, David Cassidy, during filming of the crossover. Cassidy would later appear as Siren-X in The Flash fourth season episode "Fury Rogue".

=== Music ===
Blake Neely, the primary composer of all four series, composed the score for the crossover. La-La Land Records released the soundtrack physically on June 5, 2018, in a limited run. WaterTower Music also released it digitally on June 15, 2018.

"Free Stress Test" by Professor Murder, "Justice" by Misun, "All Eyes on You" by St. Lucia, "By the Stream" by Tom Hillock & Nicolas Boscovic, "Love Is Emotional" by Neil Finn, "String Quartet No. 62 in C Major, Op. 76, No. 3, Hob. III:77, "Emperor": II. Poco Adagio, Cantabile" by Kodály Quartet, and "Runnin' Home to You" (from the musical crossover episode "Duet") performed by Melissa Benoist are heard in the first part of the crossover but not included in the soundtrack.

All music is composed by Blake Neely, Nathaniel Blume, Daniel James Chan, and Sherri Chung.

Crisis on Earth-X (Original Television Soundtrack)
No.	Title	Length
1.	"The Flag Still Stands"	3:20
2.	"We're Going to the Wedding"	1:19
3.	"Dark Arrow, the Fuhrer"	1:19
4.	"Pretending Nothing Happened"	1:39
5.	"Best Wedding Ever!"	4:41
6.	"Prometheus-X Locked Away"	3:38
7.	"A Special Kind of Idiot"	3:14
8.	"Oliver Wants a Yes"	2:26
9.	"Being True to Yourself"	2:32
10.	"Sides Meet - Saving the Building"	3:43
11.	"Big Messy Brawl with Nazis"	2:27
12.	"Dark Arrow Storms the Lab"	2:58
13.	"Overgirl Needs a Heart"	3:18
14.	"March to Their Deaths - Meeting the Ray"	2:34
15.	"Two Warriors"	2:42
16.	"Sneaking Oliver In"	2:03
17.	"Inside Nazi Command Center"	4:25
18.	"Storm Chasers"	2:36
19.	"A Hero Falls"	1:18
20.	"Ending a Tornado to Open a Breach"	2:22
21.	"Breached Back Into Mayhem"	2:56
22.	"Like a Father"	3:52
23.	"Rememberances"	2:31
24.	"Heroes Unite"	4:31
25.	"Disabling the Shields"	2:41
26.	"For the Win!"	1:49
27.	"A Kiss Goodbye - Surprise Double Wedding"	4:51
Total length:		78:18

== Marketing ==
Comic artist Phil Jimenez created a custom cover for the event, which invokes the cover design of the Justice League of America #207, the 20th annual Justice League of America and Justice Society of America crossover. Promotional trailers for the event were released throughout November, before the full trailer was released on November 20.

== Release ==
=== Broadcast ===
The crossover began with Supergirl and Arrow on November 27, 2017, and concluded on The Flash and Legends of Tomorrow on November 28, all on The CW. Arrow, which normally aired on Thursdays at 9 pm, moved to Monday at 9 pm for the crossover and did not air an additional episode on November 30. Pedowitz stated that they decided to have the crossover occur over two nights, as opposed to the four nights of "Invasion!", because The Flash and Legends of Tomorrow were already paired together on The CW's schedule, and "it would be better and tighter in terms of storytelling to make it like a two-night, four-hour miniseries. We thought this was a tight, concise way of doing it". Guggenheim added, "We're really approaching this big four-part event as two back-to-back two-hour movies, and I think when you look at it through that lens, it becomes less important for the Supergirl episode to feel like a Supergirl episode and the Arrow episode to feel like an Arrow episode, which was always our approach in the past". Guggenheim tried to get "Crisis on Earth-X" released as some kind of "single, seamless, no act breaks" movie, with the possibility of even shooting up new footage, though this was not possible due to union rules.

=== Home media ===
All four episodes and the behind-the-scenes featurette "Inside the Crossover: Crisis on Earth-X", were released on Blu-ray and DVD in Region 1 along with the rest of Arrow's sixth season on August 14, 2018, The Flash's fourth season on August 23, Supergirl's third season on September 18, and Legends of Tomorrow's third season on September 25. The four episodes were released together on a separate DVD on September 3, 2018, in Region 2, and September 5 in Region 4.

== Reception ==
=== Ratings ===
"Crisis on Earth-X" was released on The CW in four parts on November 27 and 28, 2017. The crossover was viewed by an average audience of 2.71 million viewers per episode. Part one, the second lowest viewed episode, was released to an audience of 2.71 million viewers. It was followed by the lowest viewed, Part two, with only 2.52 million. Parts three and four were the highest viewed with 2.82 and 2.8 million viewers respectively. The Arrow and Supergirl episodes were their series highest rated episode in over a year.

Viewership and ratings per episode of Crisis on Earth-X
No.	Series	Air date	Rating/share (18–49)	Viewers (millions)	DVR (18–49)	DVR viewers (millions)	Total (18–49)	Total viewers (millions)
1	Supergirl	November 27, 2017	0.9/3	2.71	0.7	1.72	1.6	4.43
2	Arrow	November 27, 2017	0.9/3	2.52	0.8	1.89	1.7	4.41
3	The Flash	November 28, 2017	1.0/4	2.82	0.7	1.83	1.7	4.64
4	Legends of Tomorrow	November 28, 2017	0.9/4	2.80	0.8	1.82	1.7	4.62

=== Critical response ===
Speaking about the crossover as a whole, Jesse Schedeen of IGN felt that "ultimately, 'Crisis on Earth-X' set a higher standard for what these crossovers can achieve than last year's 'Invasion!'". Scott Mendelson of Forbes said the "Crisis on Earth-X" was "a better Justice League movie than the actual Justice League movie and in many ways was better or at least equal to the best MCU crossover events." Rob Leane of Den of Geek thought the crossover was the "best crossover yet", saying, "It offers fresh ideas alongside heaps of fan service, and the special effects wizards behind the scenes make the limited TV budget feel like that of a massive movie."

==== Supergirl episode ====
The review aggregator website Rotten Tomatoes reported a 93% approval rating, based on 14 reviews for the episode. The website's critical consensus reads, "Kicking off an Arrowverse crossover event, "Crisis On Earth-X, Part 1" offers viewers a fun outing with quirky characters preceding the action and tragedy to come."

Schedeen gave the Supergirl episode an 8.1 out of 10. While he felt that the Supergirl episode "clearly isn't in much of a hurry to get where it's going", Schedeen said it did "prove to be a very entertaining start to the crossover." Ultimately, the episode "did, however, make the most of this massive pairing of heroes, delivering an endless stream of banter and character drama before transitioning into an epic battle royale. There are certainly worse ways to kick off a crossover." Caroline Siede at The A.V. Club awarded the episode a "B+" rating. She said the episode "isn't a particularly great episode of Supergirl, but then again it isn't really trying to be. And as the first hour of an ambitious four-part Arrowverse movie, it's hard to ask for anything more." Kayti Burt of Collider gave the episode 4 out of 5 stars, stating, "I was wildly impressed with the storytelling ambitious 'Crisis on Earth-X' has shown so far. There were some narrative missteps, but this is like nothing we have ever seen on-screen before: a true comic book-style crossover event that ties hours of superhero serials together in one epic story."

==== Arrow episode ====
Rotten Tomatoes reported an 89% approval rating, based on 9 reviews for the episode.

Schedeen gave the Arrow episode a 7 out of 10, saying that the episode "struggled to find that balance between character drama and plot progression, as well as in establishing stakes big enough to support such a massive crossover in the first place. But for all its flaws, at least this episode still included some entertaining moments and a generally strong portrayal of its twisted villains." The A.V. Club's Allison Shoemaker gave the episode a "B" rating. She thought it was "difficult to judge how successful this episode of Arrow is because it's neither an episode of Arrow nor a complete story," but concluded, "it's a lot of fun, kind of dumb, and just not as exciting as what came before. Someone has to check those boxes and set up what comes next, and it seems that this time, Arrow drew the 'event' short straw."

==== The Flash episode ====
Rotten Tomatoes reported an 89% approval rating, based on 9 reviews for the episode.

Schedeen awarded The Flash's episode a 9.2 out of 10, noting that while part 1 had "a slow start" and part 2 gave "a fairly underwhelming follow-up... the crossover finally seemed to click" in part 3. Scott Von Doviak at The A.V. Club gave the episode a "B+" rating, stating "Even a lesser installment like this one features the spectacle of the Flash and The Ray battling the Red Tornado, as well as the appealing non-superpowered Nazi-fighting team of Iris and Felicity. For the most part, I've felt like a kid coming home with a fresh stack of comics, and I can think of no higher praise than that." Mike Cecchini of Den of Geek gave it 4 out of 5 stars. He wrote that while "'mirror universe Nazis' don't make for the most nuanced of villains, and when you're using concentration camp imagery, well, you'd better make sure you're not being exploitative," The Flash's episode "completely embraces its lunacy in ways that I don't even think those first two chapters dreamed of."

==== Legends of Tomorrow episode ====
Schedeen gave the final episode an 8.5 out of 10 rating. The episode "didn't have quite the urgency it needed during the final showdown between good and evil," but "did make the most of Professor Stein's heroic sacrifice and its emotional fallout." Oliver Sava of The A.V. Club gave the episode an "A" rating, stating "No piece of live-action superhero media has captured the feeling of a comic-book crossover event like Crisis On Earth-X. With a huge cast of characters, a major death, and a final scene taking big heroes in bold new directions, Crisis delivers the thrills, the twists, and the inspiration that should come from a superhero story with this massive scope." Jim Dandy from Den of Geek rated the episode 5 out of 5 stars. He wrote, "This year's was an objectively wonderful hour of DC television, but it also moved the season's story along for Legends in a meaningful way, and provided significant character development for Jax and Sara. It gave Franz Drameh and Victor Garber a chance to stretch their acting wings, and it closed out a timely, wall-to-wall entertaining four hours of television." Collider's Carla Day gave the Legends episode 5 stars out of 5, saying the crossover was "leaps and bounds better than any of the previous crossovers." She went on to say that "It set the standard high for all future crossovers in the story, character interactions, and fight scenes."
