= Freedom Fighters: The Ray =

2017 animated Arrowverse series

- Genre: Action; Adventure; Science fiction; Superhero
- Based on: Ray Terrill by: Jack C. Harris; Joe Quesada
- Voices of: Russell Tovey; Jason Mitchell; Dilshad Vadsaria
- Composer: Daniel James Chan
- Country of origin: United States
- Original language: English
- No. of seasons: 2
- No. of episodes: 12

Production
- Executive producers: Sam Register; Greg Berlanti; Marc Guggenheim
- Producer: Curt Geda
- Editor: Kyle Stafford
- Running time: 6–8 minutes
- Production companies: Berlanti Productions; Blue Ribbon Content; DC Entertainment; Warner Bros. Animation

Original release
- Network: CW Seed
- Release: December 8, 2017 – July 18, 2018

Related
- Arrowverse

Freedom Fighters: The Ray is an American animated web series developed by Greg Berlanti and Marc Guggenheim. It premiered on December 8, 2017, on The CW's online streaming platform, CW Seed and is based on DC Comics character Ray Terrill / The Ray (portrayed by Russell Tovey), a housing rights advocate who gains light-based powers after being exposed to a genetic light bomb. The series is part of the Arrowverse franchise and is primarily set on the dystopian Earth-X, while also partly taking place on Earth-1, a parallel universe of Arrow, The Flash, Vixen and Legends of Tomorrow.

== Premise ==
Raymond "Ray" Terrill is a housing rights advocate who discovers a doppelganger of himself from another Earth. The man disappears, and gives him light-based powers, and he is recruited to join the Freedom Fighters on Earth where he battles the New Reichsmen.

== Cast and characters ==
=== Main ===
- Russell Tovey as Ray Terrill / The Ray: A public interest advocate who gains light-based powers from his Earth-X counterpart and becomes a member of the Freedom Fighters on Earth-X.
  - Tovey also voices his Earth-X counterpart, a member of the Freedom Fighters, who died fighting Overgirl, giving his powers to Ray.
- Jason Mitchell as John Trujillo: A co-worker of Terrill's that helps him learn about his newfound powers.
  - Mitchell also voices his Earth-X counterpart, Black Condor, who is member of the Freedom Fighters
- Dilshad Vadsaria as Jenny Knight: A co-worker of Terrill's.
  - Vadsaria also voices her Earth-X counterpart, Phantom Lady, who is a member of the Freedom Fighters.

=== Recurring ===
- Melissa Benoist as Overgirl: An alternate supervillain version of Supergirl of Earth-38 who is a member of the New Reichsmen on Earth-X. Benoist reprises her role from "Crisis on Earth-X".
- Iddo Goldberg as Red Tornado of Earth-X: A member of the Freedom Fighters.
- Matthew Mercer as Black Arrow: A member of the New Reichsmen that resembles Green Arrow, but is not the same as Dark Arrow. He is called Dark Arrow in "Crisis on Earth-X".
  - Mercer also voices his Earth-1 counterpart Oliver Queen / Green Arrow, replacing Stephen Amell.
- Scott Whyte as Blitzkrieg: An alternate speedster who is a member of the New Reichsmen on Earth-X.
  - Whyte also voices Barry Allen / Flash of Earth-1, replacing Grant Gustin.
- Carlos Valdes as Cisco Ramon / Vibe of Earth-X: A member of the Freedom Fighters.
  - Valdes also voices his Earth-1 counterpart, reprising his role from The Flash.
- Sunil Malhotra as Jacob: Ray's original lover.

=== Guest ===
- Matthew Mercer as Dollman
- Colleen O'Shaughnessey as Grace Terrill: Ray's mother.
- Bruce Thomas as Robert Terrill: Ray's father.
- Danielle Panabaker as Caitlin Snow: A bioengineering expert from S.T.A.R. Labs. Panabaker reprises her role from The Flash.
- Christopher Corey Smith as Donald: A politician.
- Megalyn Echikunwoke as Mari McCabe / Vixen. Echikunwoke reprises her role from Vixen
- Echo Kellum as Curtis Holt / Mister Terrific. Kellum reprises his role from Arrow

== Episodes ==
=== Season 1 (2017) ===
Freedom Fighters: The Ray, season 1 episodes
No. overall	No. in season	Title	Directed by	Written by	Original release date
1–6	1–6	"A Hero Rises"	Ethan Spaulding	Emilio Ortega Aldrich, Lauren Certo, Marc Guggenheim, Sarah Hernandez, Elizabeth Kim, Sarah Tarkoff	December 8, 2017
In Tulsa, Oklahoma, Ray Terrill / The Ray and the Freedom Fighters work to save refugees in Nazi-occupied Earth-X. The New Reichsmen, consisting of leader Overgirl, Blitzkrieg, and Black Arrow, overpower the Freedom Fighters, killing Red Tornado and Dollman. The Reichmen attempt to steal the former's cerebral cortex, but the Ray, wounded, is breached away by fellow Freedom Fighter, Vibe. On Earth-1, the counterparts of the Freedom Fighters John Trujillo / Black Condor, Jenny Knight / Phantom Lady, and the Ray are Fair Housing Department employees. When the department is shut down, Ray and John go to a bar where Ray fails to ask a man on a date. As Ray struggles with his recent unemployment and avoids coming out to his conservative parents, the Ray from Earth-X emerges through a breach and hands the cortex off to his Earth-1 counterpart, along with his powers, before succumbing to his injuries. Ray shows John his powers and the cortex, which reveals Earth-X's dire situation via a hologram of Red Tornado, who directs them to destroy it. Instead, John and Ray decide to test the latter's powers, which alerts S.T.A.R. Labs' Cisco Ramon and Caitlin Snow of metahuman activity. John and Ray go back to the bar and Ray strikes up a conversation with the man, Jacob. As Ray and Jacob are walking down the street, they discover a lesbian couple being mugged. Jacob goes for help and Ray uses his powers to take the mugger down. While fighting a pair of bank robbers, Ray takes on "The Ray" mantle. On Earth-X, Vibe searches for signatures of the Ray, but is ambushed by the Reichsmen, who are then able to pinpoint the location of the cortex. On Earth-1, as Ray prepares for a date with Jacob, he is sedated by a poisoned dart and two shadowy figures appear over him.

=== Season 2 (2018) ===
Freedom Fighters: The Ray, season 2 episodes
No. overall	No. in season	Title	Directed by	Written by	Original release date
7–12	1–6	"Earth-X"	Ethan Spaulding	Emilio Ortega Aldrich, Lauren Certo, Marc Guggenheim, Sarah Hernandez, Elizabeth Kim, Sarah Tarkoff	July 18, 2018
Ray's captors are revealed to be his Earth's Cisco Ramon / Vibe, Curtis Holt / Mister Terrific, Oliver Queen / Green Arrow, and Barry Allen / Flash, who offer to train him. They team up with Mari McCabe / Vixen to defeat a giant robot running amok, causing Ray to be late for his date with Jacob, who breaks up with Ray. Earth-X Overgirl shows up at Ray's house and steals Red Tornado's cortex from Ray's house. Ray comes out to his parents, who tell him they don't want him to be anyone other than himself. Cisco sends Ray to Earth-X, where he warns the resistance that Nazis now know their location. The New Reichsmen and their soldiers, led by Overgirl, attack their base, but the Freedom Fighters fight back, eventually resulting in the Reichsmen's defeat and capture. The Freedom Fighters learn the location of the Reich chancellor from the detained Reichsmen.

== Production ==
The series was first announced in August 2016 by The CW with a 2017 debut and to air on CW Seed, from executive producers Greg Berlanti and Marc Guggenheim and developed by Blue Ribbon Content. It was also announced that the lead character would be gay, and the network was looking for an actor to voice the character with the possibility of appearing in live-action later on. The series was inspired by Grant Morrison's Multiversity comic book series. Guggenheim noted there was "a very specific reason" the series was titled as it was, in order to introduce the Freedom Fighters and Earth-X. He continued, "Morrison came up with an idea we really responded to: The Freedom Fighters are made up of various minorities targeted by Nazis—women, gay men, Jews. We wanted to honor that idea. At the same time, it's an origin story about the Earth-1 iteration of The Ray." Earth-X is a world in the multiverse where the Nazis won World War II and the New Reichsmen rule over present day America. In September 2017, it was revealed that Russell Tovey would be voicing Ray Terrill in the series.

Freedom Fighters: The Ray is also set prior to the events of the 2017 live-action Arrowverse crossover, "Crisis on Earth-X". Guggenheim added that the animated series featured some "continuity mix-ups... [and] inconsistencies", as "Crisis on Earth-X" was conceived after Freedom Fighters was already written and Guggenheim "didn't see eye-to-eye" with fellow crossover executive producer Andrew Kreisberg on how tightly the animated series should tie-in with "Crisis on Earth-X"; Guggenheim hoped to address these with a comic book. On the series being a prequel to the crossover, Guggenheim revealed that it was not intended to be such, and was originally intended to be released before the crossover. However, once the decision was made to feature The Ray in live-action, it necessitated the casting of the correct actor, which lead to Tovey. Guggenheim explained: At that point, "we could either just continue to go forward as we already were with the animated series with a different voice and a slightly different look to the character of the Ray, or we could take the extra time to have Russell voice the character, do some design alterations, make the Ray's appearance in the animated series line up more with the way Russell actually looks. There was just no way to turn those kind of changes around and release it before the crossover. It was just more important to have Russell's voice in the series than it was to get it out early".

== Release ==
Russell Tovey as the live-action version of The Ray / Ray Terrill.

Freedom Fighters: The Ray premiered on CW Seed on December 8, 2017, releasing the first six episodes of the series. The next six episodes, marketed as the second season, was released on July 18, 2018, after debuting at the 2018 San Diego Comic-Con.

== Home media ==
In June 2018, it was announced that the first two seasons would be made available as one feature-length presentation on Blu-ray and DVD, which was released on August 28, 2018.

== Reception ==
Oliver Sava of The A.V. Club gave the first three episodes a "B" rating. He felt "the story has an interesting structure, beginning with two episodes showing the dire situation on Earth-X before making a sudden jump across dimensions for the third episode," but noted that it makes "The Ray feel like a supporting character in his own show". Sava praised the conflicts in Ray's personal life "that are largely unexplored in the superhero genre, especially in film and television," with the show showing "how they can quickly add tension and depth to fantastic narratives". Regarding Tovey's performance, Sava said, "Tovey does strong work capturing Ray's anxiety and fear about coming out, and you can hear his disappointment in himself as he tries and fails to embrace his sexuality."

Luke Y. Thompson of Forbes gave a favorable review of the Blu-Ray release. He stated that it was "the most emotionally stirring of all the DC animated movies [he'd] seen and reviewed." Thompson praised the animation saying it was "better than usual too, with more cel-shading on CG to give vistas real depth."

== Arrowverse ==
Tovey appeared as The Ray in "Crisis on Earth-X", the 2017 Arrowverse crossover event between Supergirl, Arrow, The Flash and Legends of Tomorrow. Additional concepts and characters from Freedom Fighters were featured in the crossover.

In November 2019, DC announced that they would be producing two tie-in comic books, to accompany the "Crisis on Infinite Earths" crossover event. These would include a storyline running concurrently to the on-screen episodes, focusing on the characters of The Ray, Felicity Smoak, Nyssa Al Ghul and Wally West. The first comic book was released in December 2019, with the second released in January 2020.
