= List of Justice Society titles =

The Justice Society or Justice Society of America is a team of comic book superheroes in the DC Comics Universe. First appearing in the Golden year of 1940, the team was originally named the Justice Society of America before being reintroduced in the year of 1960 under its current and most-known name, Justice League of America. Sometime in the early 1960s, a separate team took on the name and mantle of Justice Society of America, and began working closely with the Justice League throughout various team member changes, universes, and relaunches to the present day. (For that particular reason, both titles as well as others are included here.)

Since the reintroduction, a large number of team affiliations, team name changes, and spin-offs have taken place over the decades. The result is the team being prominently featured in many ongoing series, annuals, miniseries, maxiseries, one-shots, graphic novels, trade paperbacks and intercompany crossovers published by DC Comics. All titles and stories are published exclusively by DC Comics under their standard imprint, unless otherwise noted.

== Golden Age (1940–1956) ==
Title	Material collected	Published date	ISBN
All-Star Comics / Justice Society of America
JSA All-Stars Archive Vol. 1	Flash Comics #1–5, Adventure Comics #48–52, All-American Comics #19–29, Sensation Comics #1–5	2007	9781401214722
DC Finest: Justice Society of America - For America and Democracy	All-Star Comics #3–12	December 3, 2024	978-1779528476
DC Finest: Justice Society of America - The Plunder of the Psycho–Pirate	All-Star Comics #13–24	July 8, 2025	978-1799502074

== Silver and Bronze Ages (1956–1985) ==
Title	Material collected	Published date	ISBN
All-Star Comics / Adventure Comics / Justice Society of America
Justice Society Volume 1	All-Star Comics #58–67 and DC Special #29	August 2006	1-4012-0970-X
Justice Society Volume 2	All-Star Comics #68–74 and Adventure Comics #461–466,	February 2007	1-4012-1194-1
Showcase Presents: All-Star Comics	collects issues All-Star Comics #58–74 and Adventure Comics #461–466	September 2011	1-4012-3303-1

== Modern Age (1986–2011) ==
Title	Material collected	Published date	ISBN
JSA
JSA: Justice Be Done	JSA Secret Files #1; JSA #1-5	April 1, 2000	978-1563896200
JSA: Darkness Falls	JSA #6-15	July 1, 2002	978-1563897399
JSA: The Return of Hawkman	JSA #16-25; JSA Secret Files #1	November 1, 2002	978-1563899126
JSA: Fair Play	JSA #26-31; JSA Secret Files #2	May 1, 2003	978-1563899591
JSA: Stealing Thunder	JSA #32-38	October 1, 2003	978-1563899942
JSA: Savage Times	JSA #39-45	November 30, 2004	978-1401202538
JSA: Princes of Darkness	JSA #46-55	March 30, 2005	978-1401204693
JSA: Black Reign	JSA #56-58; Hawkman #23-25	July 1, 2005	1-4012-0480-5
JSA: Lost	JSA #59-67	September 30, 2005	978-1401207229
JSA: Black Vengeance	JSA #68-75	March 1, 2006	978-1401209667
JSA: Mixed Signals	JSA #76-81	September 20, 2006	978-1401209674
JSA: Ghost Stories	JSA #82-87	January 30, 2007	978-1401211967
JSA Omnibus Vol. 1 HC	JSA #1-25, JLA/JSA: Virtue and Vice, JSA All-Stars #1-8, JSA Our Worlds at War #1, JLA/JSA Secret Files #1, JSA Secret Files #1, All-Star Comics #1-2, All-American Comics #1, Adventure Comics #1, National Comics #1, Sensation Comics #1, Smash Comics #1, Star Spangled Comics #1 and Thrilling Comics #1.	May 20, 2014	978-1401247614
JSA Omnibus Vol. 2 HC	JSA #26-75, Hawkman #23-25, JSA Annual #1 and JSA Secret Files and Origins #2	December 2, 2014	978-1401251383
JSA Omnibus Vol. 3 HC	JSA #76-81, Justice Society of America #1-28, Justice Society of America Annual #1, Justice League of America #8-10, Justice Society of America: Kingdom Come Special - Superman, Justice Society of America: Kingdom Come Special - Magog and Justice Society of America: Kingdom Come Special - The Kingdom	June 24, 2015	978-1401255305
Justice Society of America
Justice Society of America: The Next Age	Justice Society of America #1–4	June 24, 2007	1-401216528
Justice Society of America: Thy Kingdom Come Part I	Justice Society of America #7–12	April 7, 2009	1-401216528
Justice Society of America: Thy Kingdom Come Part II	Justice Society of America #13–18, Annual #1	April 7, 2009	1-401216528
Justice Society of America: Thy Kingdom Come Part III	Justice Society of America #19–22, Kingdom Come Special: Superman, Kingdom Come Special: Magog, Kingdom Come Special: The Kingdom	April 13, 2010	978-1401221676
Justice Society of America, Vol. 5: Black Adam and Isis	Justice Society of America #23-28	September 8, 2009	978-1848565111
Justice Society of America: The Bad Seed	Justice Society of America #29-33	May 25, 2010	978-1401227142
Justice Society of America: Axis of Evil	Justice Society of America #34-40	December 7, 2010	978-1401229016
Justice Society of America: Supertown	Justice Society of America #44-49	October 4, 2011	978-1401232849
Justice Society of America: Monument Point	Justice Society of America #50-54	February 12, 2012	978-1401233686
Justice League of America / Justice Society of America
Justice League of America Volume 2: The Lightning Saga	Justice League of America (vol. 2) #8–12; and Justice Society of America (vol. 3) #5–6	2008	1-401216528
Justice League of America Volume 8: Dark Things	Justice League of America #44–48; Justice Society of America #41–42	April 3, 2012	978-1401231934
Miscellaneous
JSA: The Liberty Files	JSA: The Liberty Files #1–2; JSA: The Unholy Three #1–2	2004	1-4012-0203-9
America vs. the Justice Society	America vs. the Justice Society #1–4	July 28, 2015	978-1401255091
Justice Society Returns	Adventure Comics (vol. 2) #1; All-American Comics (vol. 2) #1; All-Star Comics (vol. 2) #1–2; National Comics (vol. 2) #1; Sensation Comics (vol. 2) #1; Smash Comics (vol. 2) #1; Star-Spangled Comics (vol. 2) #1; Thrilling Comics (vol. 2) #1	April 7, 2009	1-4012-0090-7
JSA: The Golden Age	THE GOLDEN AGE #1–4	March 21, 2017	1-4012-0711-1
Last Days of the Justice Society of America	Last Days of the Justice Society Special (1986) #1; and material from Secret Origins (1986-1990 2nd Series) #7, (Sandman) #9 (Star-Spangled Kid, Flash), #11 (Hawkman), #13 (Johnny Thunder), #15 (Spectre), #16 (Hourman), #18 (Green Lantern), #20 (Dr. Mid-Nite), #24 (Dr. Fate), #25 (Atom), #31 (Justice Society of America)	May 16, 2017	978-1401267339

== The New 52 (2011–2016) ==
Title	Material collected	Published date	ISBN
Earth 2 (JSA / Wonders of the Worlds)
Earth 2 Vol. 1: The Gathering	Earth 2 #1-6	March 19, 2013	978-1401244453
Earth 2 Vol. 2: The Tower of Fate	Earth 2 #0, 7-12, and DC Universe Presents #0	April 15, 2014	978-1401246143
Earth 2 Vol. 3: Battle Cry	Earth 2 #13-16, #15.1 and Earth 2 Annual #1	April 15, 2014	978-1401246150
Earth 2 Vol. 4: The Dark Age	Earth 2 #17-20, Earth 2 Annual #2	October 15, 2014	978-1401250010
Earth 2 Vol. 5: The Kryptonian	Earth 2 #21-26 and Earth 2: Futures End #2	April 15, 2015	978-1401254186
Earth 2 Vol. 6: Collision	Earth 2 #27-32	November 25, 2015	978-1401257583
Earth 2: World's End
Earth 2: World's End Vol. 1	Earth 2: World's End #1-11	May 13, 2015	978-1401256036
Earth 2: World's End Vol. 2	Earth 2 #12-26	December 2, 2015	978-1401258443
Earth 2: Society
Earth 2: Society: Planetfall	Earth 2: Society #1-7, DC Sneak Peek: Earth 2: Society	March 9, 2016	978-1401261238
Earth 2: Society: Indivisible	Earth 2 #8-12	August 24, 2016	978-1401264710
Earth 2: Society: A Whole New World	Earth 2 #13-16 and Annual #1	April 5, 2017	978-1401267971
Earth 2: Society: Life After Death	Earth 2 #17-22	August 9, 2017	978-1401271435

== Dawn of DC/DC All In (2023–2026) ==
Title	Material collected	Published date	ISBN
Justice Society of America
Justice Society of America: The New Golden Age	Justice Society of America #1-5 and The New Golden Age #1	February 28, 2024	978-1779524683
Justice Society of America: Long Live the JSA	Justice Society of America #6-12	February 18, 2025	978-1799500384
JSA
JSA: Infinity Inc. vs. the Justice Society	JSA #1-6	September 2, 2025	978-1799505365
JSA: Ragnarok	JSA #7-12	February 10, 2026	978-1799506133
JSA: Year One	JSA #13-18	August 11, 2026	978-1799508885

== See also ==
- List of Justice League titles
