= List of Justice League titles =

The Justice League (of America) is a team of comic book superheroes in the DC Comics Universe. The League was a 1960s update of the Golden Age of Comic Books team, the Justice Society of America. Sometime in the early 1960s, a separate team took on the name and mantle of Justice Society of America, and began working closely with the Justice League (throughout various universes and relaunches) to the present day. (For that particular reason, both titles as well as others are included here.)

Since their introduction, a large number of team affiliations, team name changes, and spin-offs have taken place over the decades. The result is the team being prominently featured in many ongoing series, annuals, miniseries, maxiseries, one-shots, graphic novels, trade paperbacks and intercompany crossovers published by DC Comics. All titles and stories are published exclusively by DC Comics under their standard imprint, unless otherwise noted.

== Silver and Bronze Ages (1956–1985) ==
Title	Volume	Years covered	Issues collected	Pages	ISBN	Date published
Showcase Presents / Crises Crossover
Showcase Presents: Justice League of America	Vol. 1	1960–1962	The Brave and the Bold #28–30; Justice League of America #1–16; Mystery in Space #75	544	1-4012-0761-8	December 2005
Showcase Presents: Justice League of America	Vol. 2	1963–1965	Justice League of America #17–36	520	1-4012-1203-4	January 2007
Showcase Presents: Justice League of America	Vol. 3	1965–1968	Justice League of America #37–38; #40–47; #49–57; #59–60	528	1-4012-1718-4	December 2007
Showcase Presents: Justice League of America	Vol. 4	1968–1970	Justice League of America #61–66; #68–75; #77–83	544	978-1-4012-2184-3	March 2009
Showcase Presents: Justice League of America	Vol. 5	1970–1973	Justice League of America #84; #86–92; #94–106	528	1-4012-3025-3	February 2011
Showcase Presents: Justice League of America	Vol. 6	1973–1976	Justice League of America #107–132	528	1-4012-3835-1	February 2013
Showcase Presents: All-Star Squadron	Vol. 1	1981–1983	Justice League of America #193, All-Star Squadron #1–18, All-Star Squadron Annual #1	528	1-4012-3436-4	April 2012
Crisis on Multiple Earths	Vol. 6	1981-1983	All-Star Squadron #14–15 and Justice League of America #195–197, 207–209	???	978-1401238223	June 2013
Crisis on Infinite Earths Companion Deluxe Edition	Vol. 2	1985-1986	DC Comics Presents #86, Swamp Thing #44, Losers Special #1, Legends of the DC Universe: Crisis on Infinite Earths #1, Infinity, Inc. #18–25, Infinity, Inc. Annual #1, Justice League of America #244–245, New Teen Titans (vol. 2) #13–14 and material from Detective Comics #558	???	978-1401289218	May 2019

== Modern Age (1986–2011) ==
Title	Material collected	Published date	ISBN
JLA
New World Order	(collects JLA #1–4	1997	1-56389-369-X; 1-56389-369-X
American Dreams	(collects JLA #5–9	1998	1-56389-394-0; 1-56389-394-0
JLA Deluxe Edition Vol. 1 HC	JLA #1–9 and JLA Secret Files and Origins #1	September 2008	1-84576-884-1; 1-4012-1843-1
JLA Deluxe Edition Vol. 2 HC	JLA #10–17, New Year's Evil: Prometheus and JLA/WildC.A.T.S.	2009	1-84856-320-5; 1-4012-2265-X
JLA Deluxe Edition Vol. 3 HC	JLA #22–26, 28–31 and 1,000,000	April 2010	1-4012-2659-0
JLA Deluxe Edition Vol. 4 HC	JLA #34, 36–41, JLA: Classified #1–3 and JLA: Earth 2	November 10, 2010	1-4012-2909-3
Vol. 1	collects JLA #1–9 and JLA Secret Files and Origins #1, 256 pages, softcover,	October 2011,	1-4012-3314-7, 1-4012-3314-7
Vol. 2	collects JLA #10–17, New Year's Evil: Prometheus, JLA Secret Files and Origins #2, and JLA/WildC.A.T.S.	July 17, 2012,	1-4012-3518-2
Vol. 3	collects JLA #18–31, 344 pages, softcover	January 2013,	1-4012-3832-7
Vol. 4	collects JLA #32–46, 384 pages, softcover	February 11, 2014,	1-4012-4385-1
Vol. 5	collects JLA #47–60, and JLA: Heaven's Ladder, 448 pages, softcover	June 17, 2014,	1-4012-4750-4
Vol. 6	collects JLA #61–76, 432 pages, softcover	January 27, 2015,	1-4012-5136-6
Vol. 7	collects JLA #77–93, 416 pages, softcover	May 26, 2015,	978-1-4012-5528-2
Vol. 8	collects JLA #94–106, 360 pages, softcover	May 10, 2016,	978-1-4012-6342-3
Vol. 9	collects JLA #107–125, 480 pages, softcover	Nov 25, 2016,	978-1-4012-6567-0
JLA: Crisis of Conscience	JLA #115–119	May 2006	978-1845762797
JLA: World Without a Justice League	JLA #120–125	August 2006	978-1845763350
Infinite Crisis: Companion	Day of Vengeance: Infinite Crisis Special, The OMAC Project: Infinite Crisis Special, Rann–Thanagar War: Infinite Crisis Special, Villains United: Infinite Crisis Special,	October 2006	978-1401209223
Infinite Crisis Omnibus	Action Comics #826, 829, Adventures Of Superman #639, 642, Countdown To Infinite Crisis, Day Of Vengeance #1–6, Day Of Vengeance Infinite Crisis Special, JLA #115–119, Infinite Crisis #1–7, Infinite Crisis Secret Files, The OMAC Project #1–6, The OMAC Project Infinite Crisis Special, Rann-Thanagar War #1–6, The Rann-Thanagar Infinite Crisis Special, Superman #216, 219, Villains United #1–6, Villains United Infinite Crisis Special, Wonder Woman #219	June 2012	978-1401235024
Justice League of America / Justice Society of America
Justice League of America Volume 1: The Tornado's Path	Justice League of America (vol. 2), #1-7	2013	978-1401244637
Justice League of America Volume 2: The Lightning Saga	Justice League of America (vol. 2), #0, 8–12; and Justice Society of America (vol. 3), #5–6	2008	1-401216528
Justice League of America: Injustice League	Justice League of America #13-16, JLA Wedding Special #1	2009	978-1401244620
Justice League of America: Sanctuary	Justice League of America #17-21	2010	978-1401253967
Justice League of America: The Second Coming	Justice League of America #22-26	2010	978-1401253981
Justice League of America: When Worlds Collide	Justice League of America #27, 28, 32-34	2010	978-1401253998
Justice League of America: Team History	Justice League of America #38-43	2011	978-1401253974
Justice League of America: The Dark Things	Justice League of America #44–48, Justice Society of America #41–42	April 3, 2012	978-1401231934
Justice League of America: Omega	Justice League of America #49-53, Starman/Congorilla #1	December 18, 2012	978-1401242015
Justice League of America: The Rise of Eclipso	Justice League of America #54-60, Justice Society of America #43	October 9, 2012	978-1401241216
Justice League Elite
Justice League Elite Volume One	collects Action Comics #775, JLA #100, JLA Secret Files 2004, and Justice League Elite #1–4,	2005	1-84576-191-X; 1-4012-0481-3
Justice League Elite Volume Two	collects Justice League Elite #5–12	2007	Titan Books; 1-84576-632-6; DC; 1-4012-1556-4
Justice League / Justice League of America / Justice League International / Justice League Europe / Etc.
Justice League: A New Beginning	Justice League (vol. 1) #1–6, Justice League International (vol. 1) #7	May 1989	978-0930289409
Justice League International: The Secret Gospel of Maxwell Lord	Justice League International (vol. 1) #8–12, Justice League America Annual #1	February 1992	978-1563890390
Justice League International Volume 1	Justice League (vol. 1) #1–6, Justice League International (vol. 1) #7	March 2008	978-1401217396
Justice League International Volume 2	Justice League International (vol. 1) #8–13, Justice League Annual #1, Suicide Squad #13	August 2008	978-1401218263
Justice League International Volume 3	Justice League International (vol. 1) #14–22	November 2008	978-1401219413
Justice League International Volume 4	Justice League International (vol. 1) #23–25, Justice League America #26–30	March 2009	978-1401221966
Justice League International Volume 5	Justice League International Annual #2–3, Justice League Europe #1–6	January 2011	978-1401230104
Justice League International Volume 6	Justice League America #31–35, Justice League Europe #7–11	May 2011	978-1401231194
Justice League International Book One: Born Again	Justice League (vol. 1) #1–6, Justice League International (vol. 1) #7–17, Justice League Annual #1, Justice League International Annual #2, Suicide Squad #13	January 2020	978-1401295714
Justice League International Book Two: Around the World	Justice League International (vol. 1) #18–25, Justice League America #26–30, Justice League Europe #1–6, Justice League International Annual #3	January 2021	978-1779507617
Superman & Justice League America Vol. 1	Justice League America #60–68, Justice League Spectacular #1	March 2016	978-1401260972
Superman & Justice League America Vol. 2	Justice League America #69–77, Annual #7	September 2016	978-1401263843
Wonder Woman & Justice League America Vol. 1	Justice League America #78–93, Annual #8	March 2017	978-1401268343
Wonder Woman & Justice League America Vol. 2	Justice League America #86–91, Justice League International (vol. 2) #65–66, Justice League Task Force #13–14	October 2017	978-1401274009
Justice League: Corporate Maneuvers	Justice League Quarterly #1–4	February 2020	978-1401299064
Justice League International Omnibus Vol. 1	Justice League (vol. 1) #1–6, Annual #1, Justice League International (vol. 1) #7–25, Annual #2–3, Justice League Europe #1–6, Justice League America #26–30, Suicide Squad #13	October 2017	978-1401273866
Justice League International Omnibus Vol. 2	Justice League America #31–50, Justice League Europe #7–25, Justice League America Annual #4, Justice League Europe Annual #1, Justice League Quarterly #1, Justice League International Special #1	November 2020	978-1779502964
Formerly Known as the Justice League	Formerly Known as the Justice League #1–6	April 2004	978-1401203054
I Can't Believe It's Not The Justice League	JLA: Classified #4–9	December 2005	978-1401204785
Justice League of America: The Dark Things	Justice League of America #44–48, Justice Society of America #41–42).	April 3, 2012	978-1401231934
Justice League Task Force
Justice League Task Force Vol. 1: Purification Plague	Justice League Task Force #1–12	March 27, 2018	978-1401277963
Wonder Woman & the Justice League America Vol. 2	Justice League Task Force #13–14, Plus Justice League America #86–91, Justice League International vol. 2 #65–66	October 10, 2017	978-1401274009
Justice League: Generation Lost
Justice League: Generation Lost Vol. 1	Justice League: Generation Lost #1–12	April 2011	978-1401230203
Justice League: Generation Lost Vol. 2	Justice League: Generation Lost #13–24	October 2011	978-1401232832

== The New 52 (2011–2016) ==
Title	Years Covered	Page count	Material collected	Publication date	ISBN
Justice League
Justice League Volume 1: Origin	2011 - 2012	173	collects Justice League (vol. 2) issues #1–6	January 30, 2013	SC: 978-1401237882
Justice League Volume 2: The Villain's Journey	2012	173	collects Justice League issues #7–12	October 8, 2013	
Justice League Volume 3: Throne of Atlantis	2012-2013	192	collects Justice League issues #13-17 and Aquaman #15-16	April 8, 2014	
Justice League Volume 4: The Grid	2013	176	collects Justice League issues #18-20, 22-23	September 16, 2014	
Justice League Volume 5: Forever Heroes	2013-2014	168	collects Justice League (Vol. 2) #24–29	October 9, 2014	
Justice League Volume 6: Injustice League	2014-2015	272	collects Justice League issues #30-39	March 15, 2016	
Justice League Volume 7: Darkseid War Part 1	2015	176	Justice League (vol. 2) #40–44, DC Sneak Peek: Justice League	March 2016	978-1401264529
Justice League Volume 8: Darkseid War Part 2	2015-2016	200	Justice League (vol. 2) #46–50, Justice League: The Darkseid War Special	October 2016	978-1401265397
Justice League: Trinity War	2012-2013	320	collects Justice League Vol. 2 #22–23, Justice League of America Vol. 3 #6–7, Justice League Dark #22–23, Constantine #5, Trinity of Sin: Pandora #1–3, Trinity of Sin: The Phantom Stranger Vol. 4 #11	March 12, 2014	978-1-4012-4519-1
Justice League: The Darkseid War	2015-2016	376	Justice League (vol. 2) #40–50, Justice League: The Darkseid War Special, DC Sneak Peek: Justice League	October 2018	978-1401284558
Justice League: The New 52 Omnibus Vol. 1	2011-2013	1248	Justice League #0-22; Aquaman #14-16; Justice League Dark #22-23; DC Comics - The New 52 FCBD Special Edition #1; Justice League of America #6-7; Trinity of Sin: The Phantom Stranger #11; Constantine #5; Trinity of Sin: Pandora #1-3.	June 22, 2021	978-1779510662
Justice League: The New 52 Omnibus Vol. 2	2013-2016	1256	Justice League (vol. 2) #24–52, DC Sneak Peek: Justice League #1, Justice League: Darkseid War Special #1, Justice League: Darkseid War: Batman #1, Justice League: Darkseid War: The Flash #1, Justice League: Darkseid War: Green Lantern #1, Justice League: Darkseid War: Lex Luthor #1, Justice League: Darkseid War: Shazam! #1, Justice League: Darkseid War: Superman #1 and Forever Evil #1–7, DC Universe: Rebirth #1, Justice League feat. Secret Society #234, Justice League of America feat. Black Adam #74,	August 2022	978-1779515582
Justice League of America
Justice League of America Volume 1: World's Most Dangerous	2013	224	Justice League of America (Vol. 3) #1-5	November 6. 2013	
Justice League of America Volume 2: Survivors of Evil	2013-2014	192	collects Justice League of America (Vol. 3) #8–14	October 9, 2014	978-1401247263
Justice League of America: Power and Glory HC	2015-2017	256	Justice League of America Vol. 4 #1–4, 6–10	March 15, 2017	
Justice League Dark
Justice League Dark Vol. 1: In the Dark	2011-2012	144	Justice League Dark (Vol. 1) #1-6	October 10, 2012	
Justice League Dark Vol. 2: The Books of Magic	2012	224	Justice League Dark (Vol. 1) #7-13, 0, Annual #1	July 10, 2013	
Justice League Dark Vol. 3: The Death of Magic	2013	192	Justice League Dark (Vol. 1) #14–21	February 4, 2014	978-1401252359
Justice League Dark Vol. 4: The Rebirth of Evil	2013-2014	208	Justice League Dark #22-29	August 26, 2014	978-1401247256
Justice League Dark Vol. 5: Paradise Lost	2014	160	Justice League Dark #30-34, Future's End #1	February 25, 2015	
Justice League Dark Vol. 6: Lost in Forever	2015-2015	192	Justice League Dark #35–40, Justice League Dark Annual #2	September 1, 2015	978-1401254810
Justice League Dark: The New 52 Omnibus	2011-2015	1624	Collecting Justice League Dark #0–40; Justice League Dark Annual #1–2; Justice League Dark: Futures End #1, Constantine #5, #9–12; I, Vampire #7–8; Justice League #22–23; Justice League of America #6–7; The New 52: Free Comic Book Day Special Edition #1; Trinity of Sin: Pandora #1–3, #6–9; and Trinity of Sin: Phantom Stranger #11, #14 17; artwork gallery, and an introduction by Peter Milligan	November 9, 2021	978-1779513137
Justice League United
Justice League United Vol. 1: Justice League Canada	2014	176	Justice League United #0–5	March 2015	978-1401252359
Justice League United Vol. 2: The Infinitus Saga	2014-2015	224	Justice League United #7–10, Annual #1, Justice League United: Futures End #1 and Justice League: Futures End #1	December 2015	978-1401257668
Justice League United Volume 3: Reunited TP		160	Justice League United #11–16	January 4, 2017	
Justice League International
Justice League International Vol. 1: The Signal Masters	2011-2012	144	Justice League International (vol. 3) #1–6	May 2012	978-1401235345
Justice League International Vol. 2: Breakdown	2012	200	Justice League International (vol. 3) #7–12, Annual (vol. 2) #1, The Fury of Firestorm: The Nuclear Men #9	January 2013	978-1401237936
Convergence: Zero Hour Book One		???	Convergence: Justice League International #1–2 and Convergence: Catwoman #1–2, Convergence: Superboy #1–2, Convergence: Green Arrow #1–2, Convergence: Suicide Squad #1–2	October 2015	978-1401258399
Justice League 3000 / Justice League 3001
Justice League 3000 Vol. 1: Yesterday Lives	2014	176	Justice League 3000 #1–7	October 2014	978-1401250461
Justice League 3000 Vol. 2: The Camelot War	2014-2015	144	Justice League 3000 #8–13	April 2015	978-1401254148
Justice League 3001 Vol. 1: Deja Vu All Over Again	2015-2016	184	Justice League 3000 #14–15, DC Sneak Peek: Justice League 3001 #1, Justice League 3001 #1–6	March 2016	978-1401261481
Justice League 3001 Vol. 2: Things Fall Apart	2016	152	Justice League 3001 #7–12	September 2016	978-1401264727
Complete Collections and Omnibus Editions
Justice League: The Darkseid War Saga Omnibus		528	Justice League (vol. 2) #40–50, Justice League: The Darkseid War Special, DC Sneak Peek: Justice League, Justice League: The Darkseid War: Superman #1, Justice League: The Darkseid War: Batman #1, Justice League: The Darkseid War: The Flash #1, Justice League: The Darkseid War: Green Lantern #1, Justice League: The Darkseid War: Shazam! #1, Justice League: The Darkseid War: Lex Luthor #1	October 2017	978-1401274023
Justice League: Darkseid War – Power of the Gods HC		200	Justice League: Darkseid War – Batman #1, Justice League: Darkseid War – The Flash #1, Justice League: Darkseid War – Green Lantern #1, Justice League: Darkseid War – Lex Luthor #1, Justice League: Darkseid War – Shazam! #1, Justice League: Darkseid War – Superman #1	April 20, 2016	
DC Comics The New 52 Villains Omnibus		1,184	collects Action Comics Vol. 2 #23.1–23.4, Aquaman Vol. 7 #23.1–23.2, Batman Vol. 2 #23.1–23.4, Batman and Robin Vol. 2 #23.1–23.4, Batman/Superman #3.1, Batman: The Dark Knight Vol. 2 #23.1–23.4, Detective Comics Vol. 2 #23.1–23.4, Earth 2 #15.1–15.2, The Flash Vol. 4 #23.1–23.3, Green Arrow Vol. 6 #23.1, Green Lantern Vol. 5 #23.1–23.4, Justice League Vol. 2 #23.1–23.4, Justice League Dark #23.1–23.2, Justice League of America Vol. 3 #7.1–7.4, Superman Vol. 3 #23.1–23.4, Swamp Thing Vol. 5 #23.1, Teen Titans Vol. 4 #23.1–23.2, Wonder Woman Vol. 4 #23.1–23.2	November 12, 2013	978-1-4012-4496-5

== DC Rebirth (2016–2017) ==
Title	Page count	Material collected	Publication date	ISBN	Ref
Justice League
Justice League Volume 1: The Extinction Machines TP	168	Justice League: Rebirth #1, Justice League Vol. 3 #1–5	January 18, 2017		
Justice League Volume 2: Outbreak TP	152	Justice League (Vol.) 3 #6–11	April 26, 2017		
Justice League vs. Suicide Squad HC	312	Justice League vs. Suicide Squad #1–6, Suicide Squad (Vol. 5) #8–10, Justice League (Vol. 3) #12–13	June 21, 2017		
Justice League Volume 3: Timeless TP	144	Justice League (Vol. 3) #14–19	July 12, 2017		
Justice League Volume 4: Endless TP	152	Justice League (Vol. 3) #20–25	November 1, 2017		
Justice League Volume 5: Legacy TP	144	Justice League (Vol. 3) #26–31	February 28, 2018	978-1-4012-7725-3	
Dark Nights: Metal — The Resistance	???	Teen Titans (vol. 6) #12, Nightwing (vol. 4) #29, Suicide Squad (vol. 5) #26, Green Arrow (vol. 6) #32, The Flash (vol. 5) #33, Hal Jordan and the Green Lantern Corps #32, Justice League (vol. 3) #32–33, Batman: Lost #1, Hawkman: Found #1	June 21, 2017	978-1401282981	
Dark Nights: Metal Omnibus	???	Dark Nights: Metal #1–6, Batman: Lost #1, Dark Nights: Metal Director's Cut #1, Dark Knights Rising: The Wild Hunt #1, Dark Days: The Forge #1, Dark Days: The Casting #1, Batman: The Red Death #1, Batman: The Devastator #1, Batman: The Merciless #1, Batman: The Murder Machine #1, Batman: The Drowned #1, Batman: The Dawnbreaker #1, The Batman Who Laughs #1, Teen Titans (vol. 6) #12, Nightwing (vol. 4) #29, Suicide Squad (vol. 5) #26, Green Arrow (vol. 6) #32, The Flash (vol. 5) #33, Hal Jordan and the Green Lantern Corps #32, Justice League (vol. 3) #32–33, Hawkman: Found #1	June 1, 2023	978-1779517036	
Justice League: The Rebirth Collection Deluxe Edition Book One HC	312	Justice League: Rebirth #1, Justice League Vol. 3 #1–11	July 12, 2017		
Justice League: The Rebirth Collection Deluxe Edition Book Two HC	344	Justice League Vol. 3 #12–25	April 11, 2018		
Justice League Dark / Wonder Woman
Wonder Woman and Justice League Dark: The Witching Hour		Wonder Woman (vol. 5) #56–57; Wonder Woman and Justice League Dark: The Witching Hour #1; Justice League Dark #4 and Justice League Dark and Wonder Woman: The Witching Hour #1	2019	978-1401290733	
Justice League of America
Justice League of America: Road to Rebirth TP	128	Justice League of America: Rebirth #1, Justice League of America: The Atom Rebirth #1, Justice League of America: Killer Frost Rebirth #1, Justice League of America: The Ray Rebirth #1, Justice League of America: Vixen Rebirth #1	June 7, 2017		
Justice League of America: The Rebirth Deluxe Edition Book One HC	288	Justice League of America: Rebirth #1, Justice League of America: The Atom Rebirth #1, Justice League of America: Killer Frost Rebirth #1, Justice League of America: The Ray Rebirth #1, Justice League of America: Vixen Rebirth #1, Justice League of America Vol. 5 #1–6	November 15, 2017		
Justice League of America Volume 1: The Extremists TP	168	Justice League of America (Vol. 5) #1–6	August 9, 2017		
Justice League of America Volume 2: Curse of the Kingbutcher TP	128	Justice League of America (Vol. 5) #7–11	November 8, 2017		
Justice League of America Volume 3: Panic in the Microverse TP	144	Justice League of America (Vol. 5) #12–17	March 7, 2018		

== New Justice (2018–2021) ==
Title	Material collected	Published date	ISBN
Justice League / Justice League Dark
Justice League Dark 1: The Last Age of Magic	Justice League Dark (vol. 2) #1–3 and #5–6	March 12, 2019	
Justice League Dark 2: Lords of Order	Justice League Dark (vol. 2) #8–12 and Annual #1	October 22, 2019	
Justice League Dark Vol. 3: The Witching War	Justice League Dark (vol. 2) #14–19	May 12, 2020	
Justice League Dark Vol. 4: A Costly Trick of Magic	Justice League Dark (vol. 2) #20–28	January 26, 2021	
Justice League: Death Metal	Justice League (vol. 4) #53–57	September 2021	978-1779511997
Justice League: No Justice	Justice League: No Justice #1–4, and stories from DC Nation #0	September 25, 2018	978-1401283346
Future State: Justice League	Future State: Justice League #1–2, Future State: Justice League Dark #1–2, Future State: Aquaman #1–2, Future State: Green Lantern #1–2, Future State: The Flash #1–2	June 22, 2021	978-1779510655
Justice League: Endless Winter	Justice League: Endless Winter #1–2, The Flash #767, Superman: Endless Winter Special #1, Aquaman #66, Justice League #58, Teen Titans: Endless Winter Special #1, Justice League Dark #29, Black Adam: Endless Winter Special #1	November 2021	978-1779511539
Justice League Odyssey
Justice League Odyssey Vol. 1: The Ghost Sector	Justice League Odyssey (2018) #1–5	May 22, 2019	978-1401289492
Justice League Odyssey, Vol. 2: Death of the Dark	Justice League Odyssey #6-12	November 27, 2019	978-1401295066
Justice League Odyssey, Vol. 3: Final Frontier	Justice League Odyssey #13–18	August 25, 2020	978-1401299873
Justice League Odyssey, Vol. 4: Last Stand	Justice League Odyssey #19–25	March 30, 2021	978-1779509161

== Infinite Frontier (2021–2023) ==
Title	Material collected	Published date	ISBN
Justice League / Justice League Dark (2021–2023)
Justice League Dark 5: The Great Wickedness	Justice League (vol. 4) #59–71 and Justice League Dark 2021 Annual #1	October 22, 2019	978-1779515513
Justice League Incarnate
Justice League Incarnate	Justice League Incarnate #1–5	October 25, 2022	978-1779517951

== DC All In (2024–present) ==
Title	Material collected	Published date	ISBN
Justice League Unlimited
Justice League Unlimited: Into the Inferno	Justice League Unlimited (vol. 2) #1–5	August 6, 2025	978-1799505716
Justice League Unlimited/World's Finest: We Are Yesterday	Batman/Superman: World's Finest #38–39, 2025 Annual, Justice League Unlimited (vol. 2) #6–8	November 5, 2025	978-1799505488
Justice League Unlimited: The Omega Act	Justice League Unlimited (vol. 2) #9–11, Justice League: Dark Tomorrow Special #1, Justice League: The Omega Act Special #1	April 29, 2026	978-1799505723
DC K.O.: Justice League Unlimited	Justice League Unlimited (vol. 2) #12–16	August 19, 2026	978-1799512844
Justice League: The Atom Project
Justice League: The Atom Project	Justice League: The Atom Project #1–6	October 8, 2025	978-1799505877
Justice League Red
Justice League Red	Justice League Red #1–6	May 13, 2026	978-1799509479
Cheetah & Cheshire Rob the Justice League
Justice League: Cheetah & Cheshire Rob the Justice League	Cheetah & Cheshire Rob the Justice League #1–6	May 20, 2026	978-1779517951

== Other related collections ==
- Identity Crisis

== See also ==
- List of Justice Society titles
