= Without a Trace season 4 =

Without a Trace
- Season 4
- DVD cover
- Starring: Anthony LaPaglia; Poppy Montgomery; Marianne Jean-Baptiste; Enrique Murciano; Eric Close; Roselyn Sánchez
- No. of episodes: 24

Release
- Original network: CBS
- Original release: September 29, 2005 – May 18, 2006

Season chronology
- ← Previous; Season 3 Next → Season 5

The fourth season of the television drama Without a Trace premiered September 29, 2005 on CBS and ended on May 18, 2006. There are 24 episodes in this season. Roselyn Sánchez joins the cast as Elena Delgado in this season.

The fourth season of Without a Trace has not had an official release on DVD in region 1, though it is available as an MOD. It was released in region 2 in Germany on May 15, 2008 on and in the UK on July 14, 2008. In region 4, the fourth season was released on July 1, 2009.

== Cast ==
- Anthony LaPaglia as FBI Missing Persons Unit Supervisory Special Agent John Michael "Jack" Malone
- Poppy Montgomery as FBI Missing Persons Unit Special Agent Samantha "Sam" Spade
- Marianne Jean-Baptiste as FBI Missing Persons Unit Special Agent Vivian "Viv" Johnson
- Enrique Murciano as FBI Missing Persons Unit Special Agent SA Danny Taylor
- Eric Close as FBI Missing Persons Unit Special Agent Martin Fitzgerald
- Roselyn Sánchez as FBI Missing Persons Unit Special Agent Elena Delgado

== Episodes ==
No. overall	No. in season	Title	Directed by	Written by	Original release date	Prod. code	U.S. viewers (millions)
71	1	"Showdown"	John F. Showalter	David Amann	September 29, 2005	2T6101	20.98
Martin and Danny are ambushed by Emil Dornvald, who ends up killing the prisoner they are transporting. Martin is in serious condition, and a barely wounded Danny is at the end of his rope as he tries to find the man who put Martin in the hospital. Jack has his hands full with keeping Danny in check and hunting down Emil Dornvald, the mercenary who had previously worked for General Gamba. Things get sticky when the team find themselves having to deal with red tape, especially when Martin's father Victor Fitzgerald and Tom Banes of Homeland Security get involved, determined to make a deal with Nuru, whom Jack believes isn't the friend that Homeland Security believes he is.
72	2	"Safe"	Jeannot Szwarc	David Grae	October 6, 2005	2T6102	21.25
The team searches for Ryan Wallace, a missing teenager who was obsessed with the safety of his school after losing a parent and watching the towers fall on 9/11. Martin and Vivian return from medical leave. Jack seems to be feeling protective of his staff and loses his temper when Danny puts himself in the way of unnecessary harm.
73	3	"From the Ashes"	Timothy Busfield	Gwendolyn M. Parker	October 13, 2005	2T6103	20.55
Rookie Elena Delgado joins the team as they search for Dina Kingston, a missing prostitute who had recently attempted suicide then come into a large sum of money. Martin continues his struggles to recover from his injuries, and is upset with what he perceives as his co-workers' pity for him.
74	4	"Lost Time"	Martha Mitchell	David H. Goodman	October 20, 2005	2T6104	19.82
Seven years earlier, university professor Thomas Beal confessed to and was convicted of the murder of his student lover, even though no body was found. After Skye Petersen's backpack surfaces in a pawn shop and video surveillance shows it was dropped off by someone who looked remarkably like Skye would have if she had lived, Jack reopens the case, concerned that his investigative tactics seven years earlier led to Beal confessing to a crime he didn't commit.
75	5	"Honor Bound"	Ken Collins	Amantha Segel Marks	October 27, 2005	2T6105	21.75
Wendy Kim goes missing during her shift at the family deli, and the team gets involved to find out what happened to the young Korean woman. It isn't long before they learn that Wendy had recently broken off an engagement to a young Korean man her parents were very supportive of, and that she had recently been doing a lot of on-line dating and had gotten herself involved with the wrong kind of men, including one who wouldn't take no for an answer.
76	6	"Viuda Negra"	Paul McCrane	Scott A. Williams	November 3, 2005	2T6106	20.44
After James Costin is kidnapped after enjoying a night out with his wife in Mexico, Danny and Jack go in at the request of James' mother-in-law, but find that between the Mexican authorities and the grieving wife, no one is too willing to help them. While Vivian, Sam, Martin and Elena work the case back in New York, Jack and Danny have to tread a thin line working with the Federal Police and trying to get information from a population living in fear of notorious cartels. The team soon becomes suspicious of Lucy Costin, convinced she knows more about her husband's disappearance than she is saying.
77	7	"The Innocents"	Martha Mitchell	Jan Nash	November 10, 2005	2T6107	20.78
The team worries about a grieving father who couldn't accept his daughter's death, especially after child pornography is found in his home. This leads to a nerve-racking and painful hunt for a little girl who's being held as a sex slave.
78	8	"A Day in the Life"	Jeannot Szwarc	Hank Steinberg	November 17, 2005	2T6108	21.66
After young Shawn Hopkins disappears one night after leaving the arcade, his parents soon begin to believe that the team is not doing everything to find their son, and are shocked to learn that their son has been gambling and has also been seen with a local drug dealer. After learning that Shawn had taken up the cause of a friend who had been raped, Larry and Susan Hopkins are relieved to learn that their son wasn't doing anything wrong, but worried that he still might not come home. This episode is seen through the eyes of the missing boy's parents point of view.
79	9	"Freefall"	John F. Showalter	David Mongan	November 24, 2005	2T6109	19.50
Max Cassidy vanishes after leaving a message on his wife's voicemail, with both Jack and Ann frantic to find him. While investigating, Jack realizes that Max was having an affair, and that he's gotten much deeper into a case than he should have following the murder of his partner, Jimmy, a man Max had felt was too green for undercover work. Both Jack and Ann fear the worst as the team tries to hunt down Max. Martin takes a fall that aggravates the injury to his hip leading to problems in further episodes.
80	10	"When Darkness Falls"	Jeff T. Thomas	Hank Steinberg & Diego Gutierrez	December 8, 2005	2T6110	21.76
Sam agrees to do a favor for a friend by looking into the identity of a young female amnesiac who was found wearing expensive clothes by two police officers. The investigation leads them to a play the woman was involved in and a mugging gone wrong, then follows the trail to the woman's past, which seems to have been the trigger for her amnesia. Jack takes some time off work to deal with his father Frank, who is getting worse as his Alzheimer's begins to take over and his kidneys fail. Jack finally convinces Frank to seek help, but it's too late, and Jack has to say goodbye to his father.
81	11	"Blood Out"	Scott White	Gwendolyn M. Parker	January 5, 2006	2T6111	20.94
Cole Warren, a paramedic who's respected in the community and honored for his service, vanishes and the team believes that local gang members have something to do with his disappearance. Meanwhile, Jack is troubled to learn that his father wanted to be cremated, a change he made shortly before his death.
82	12	"Patient X"	Timothy Busfield	David Amann	January 19, 2006	2T6112	23.12
After therapist Gina Hill disappears, the team investigates and initially suspects that one of her patients may be involved. After discussions with Gina's fiancé and her own therapist, the team follows the trail of clues to a bartender named Vince with an unusual ability to get good women to do whatever he wants them to. Martin runs out of prescription painkiller and starts to experience withdrawal symptoms.
83	13	"Rage"	Kate Woods	Scott A. Williams	January 26, 2006	2T6113	22.30
When high school teacher Claire Hunter goes missing, the team's investigation leads them to suspect that she may have been too closely connected to a student.
84	14	"Odds or Evens"	Martha Mitchell	David H. Goodman	February 2, 2006	2T6114	20.80
After Andy Reynolds, a dishonorably discharged U.S. Marine, goes missing, Jack heads to Tokyo, where Reynolds once confessed to raping a young woman. Back in the U.S., the other agents continue to investigate Reynolds' life, and learn that he had recently gotten the victim to tape a sworn statement that he wasn't the rapist after learning that a former lover had given birth to his child.
85	15	"The Stranger"	John F. Showalter	Jan Nash	February 9, 2006	2T6115	20.34
When Leah Robinson goes missing after a confrontation with a young man at an art gallery, the team moves in to investigate and soon become suspicious of Leah, suspecting her of murdering young women that she believed to be involved with her husband, Ken. Ann isn't quite ready to take her romance with Jack public, and their relationship gets rocky when their different methods of handling the case tip off the suspect.
86	16	"The Little Things"	John Polson	David Grae	March 2, 2006	2T6116	19.78
After five-year-old Ethan Heller is abducted in broad daylight, the team gets involved and soon begins to suspect that Ethan's father knows more than he's saying. While looking into Jim Heller, the team learns that his company, Genacore, had been pushing the wonder-drug Elixair and Heller had learned that the drug was dangerous to children. Danny becomes suspicious of Martin as his behavior becomes increasingly erratic, which includes barking at the mother of the missing boy and putting both himself, the boy and Danny in danger.
87	17	"Check Your Head"	Timothy Busfield	Diego Gutierrez	March 9, 2006	2T6117	20.28
Rachel Gibson, an agoraphobic advice columnist, goes missing from her apartment after sending her latest article to the paper. The team gets involved to try to find out what happened and initially suspects that Rachel was kidnapped, especially after an eye witness tells them about seeing a man drag her out of her apartment, but turn their attention to a man who was believed to be stalking her once they find out that Rachel had recently purchased a handgun.
88	18	"The Road Home"	Chad Lowe	David Mongan	March 30, 2006	2T6118	18.48
The team searches for 18-year-old Brandon Parker only to learn that 15-year-old Matt Jameson had stolen his former teammate's identity in order to get a job to support his three younger siblings after his mother had taken off. They manage to connect Matt to an old friend from a former foster home, Casey Miller, and soon realize that Matt has gotten in over his head while trying to keep his younger sisters and brother together. Sam starts to get suspicious of Martin's behavior and confronts him on his drug addiction. She goes to Danny looking for help, but Danny is reluctant to get involved in Martin's problems.
89	19	"Expectations"	Rosemary Rodriguez	David Rapp	April 13, 2006	2T6119	18.62
Megan Sullivan is H.I.V. positive, pregnant and missing. Initially the team suspects that her husband, who seemed to be less than thrilled about the baby, is involved, but soon learn that Megan had received a call from a prison, and their search tracks them to a former lover, who gave her H.I.V., her husband's former mistress, who had seen her taking part in a tense conversation not long before she vanished, and her own H.I.V. specialist, who had recently given her bad news. Martin thanks Danny for his help, and tells him that he is continuing to seek counseling for his addiction.
90	20	"More Than This"	Timothy Busfield	Scott A. Williams	April 20, 2006	2T6120	16.93
After Breck Mulligan goes missing from the women's shelter he had been working at, the team is called in to investigate. Breck was originally assigned to work at the shelter as part of his probation for drug related offenses, but the plight of the women and children seeking help had gotten to him and he had continued to work for the shelter, even going so far as to sleep with rich older women to get donations to help the shelter. The team is surprised to learn how little faith Breck's family and friends had in him, discovering that his friends had staged in 'intervention' the night he went missing, trying to convince him to walk away from his new life.
91	21	"Shattered"	Jeannot Szwarc	Amanda Segel Marks & David H. Goodman	April 27, 2006	2T6121	17.93
A 15-year-old ice-skating champion, Kelly McMurphy, goes missing, two months after her elder brother dies in a car accident. Suspicion is on her parents, who may be pressuring her to train harder and win, as well as fellow skaters who may be competitive, as well as an older man the skater was last seen with.
92	22	"Requiem"	John F. Showalter	Jan Nash	May 4, 2006	2T6122	19.11
The team searches for Ted Jordano and his teenage children after the three turn up missing and their house is a veritable bloodbath.
93	23	"White Balance"	Jeff T. Thomas	Greg Walker	May 11, 2006	2T6123	19.19
Jack finds himself in the hotseat when Emily Grant, a young white woman and Darnell Williams, a young black man, go missing on the same night and Jack is ordered to put more of the team's resources into finding the young woman.
94	24	"Crossroads"	Jeannot Szwarc	David Amann	May 18, 2006	2T6124	19.81
After attorney Jennifer Nichols disappears, the team investigates the last few days in her life and soon find that she had grown disillusioned with her most recent relationship with Allen Davis. Discussions with a married ex-lover reveal that Nichols had recently gone through an old case file relating to a ten-year-old bank robbery, which has a connection to her recent relationship. Jack and Ann avoid discussing a recent development in their relationship – her pregnancy.
