= Without a Trace season 2 =

Without a Trace
- Season 2
- DVD cover
- Starring: Anthony LaPaglia; Poppy Montgomery; Marianne Jean-Baptiste; Enrique Murciano; Eric Close
- No. of episodes: 24

Release
- Original network: CBS
- Original release: September 25, 2003 – May 20, 2004

Season chronology
- ← Previous; Season 1 Next → Season 3

The second season of Without a Trace premiered September 25, 2003 on CBS and concluded May 20, 2004. There are 24 episodes in this season.

The second season was released on DVD in region 1 on March 13, 2007. In region 2 the first season was released on DVD in Germany on November 18, 2005 and in the UK on January 16, 2006. In region 4 the second season was released on November 16, 2005.

== Cast ==
- Anthony LaPaglia as FBI Missing Persons Unit Supervisory Special Agent John Michael "Jack" Malone
- Poppy Montgomery as FBI Missing Persons Unit Special Agent Samantha "Sam" Spade
- Marianne Jean-Baptiste as FBI Missing Persons Unit Special Agent Vivian "Viv" Johnson
- Enrique Murciano as FBI Missing Persons Unit Special Agent SA Danny Taylor
- Eric Close as FBI Missing Persons Unit Special Agent Martin Fitzgerald

== Episodes ==
No. overall	No. in season	Title	Directed by	Written by	Original release date	Prod. code	U.S. viewers (millions)
24	1	"The Bus"	Paul Holahan	Hank Steinberg	September 25, 2003	176401	16.68
Jack and the team search for a school bus full of children. The bus disappears with the children (mostly from wealthy families) and the driver presumably onboard somewhere along the morning route to school.The FBI agents immediately begin to speculate on potential suspects, ranging from students on board the bus, the driver, teachers at the school, and parents of the missing children. Before long, a tip is called in telling the team where the bus is located and upon finding it abandoned, they discover one child, Johnny (Anton Yelchin), on board who informs the agents that two students have kidnapped the students and driver and are demanding a multi-million dollar ransom for their safe return. Johnny's story is questioned when it is discovered that the phoned in tip about the location of the bus came from within the school. The case becomes even more complicated when one of the kidnapped students manages to send a video message to her mother, featuring the face of someone known not to be the driver or a student. The case takes several twists and turns, as multiple suspects appear, none telling everything they know. Also, Jack has reconciled with his wife while Sam makes a mistake during the case that could have disastrous repercussions for herself and Jack.
25	2	"Revelations"	Charles Correll	Jan Nash	October 2, 2003	176402	15.26
Father Henry Stephens goes missing from his church after returning from the scene of a road accident, during which he gave Last Rites to a dying woman. When the FBI agents arrive, they speculate on the reasons for the disappearance, including Henry's declining health from cirrhosis of the liver and his state of mind following the accident. However, when Vivian is told that a doner liver has been found for Henry, the search for the missing man becomes increasingly urgent. During the investigation, the team find a large stash of money in Henry's apartment that has traces of drugs on it, and when it is discovered that he had contact with a man recently released from prison, it appears that Henry may not have been the man of virtue that he first appeared. Some clever detective work by Samantha, confined to desk work after a shooting incident in the previous episode, provides an insight into the Father's background and the other members of the team must race against time to follow up the information and find the missing man.
26	3	"Confidence"	Randy Zisk	Greg Walker	October 9, 2003	176403	16.15
Whitney Ridder, a newly engaged socialite, goes missing from her own engagement party. Friends of hers report that she took a phone call during the party and that she appeared to be arguing with the person on the other end. Upon looking into the missing woman's background, the team discover that nothing is as it seems, but it isn't until the team discover the identity of the mystery caller, a criminal Martin dealt with in the past. The team receive conflicting opinions on her current state, and in order to find her, they must figure out whether the past has caught up with her or whether she really is a changed character who has found love but the case turns into a murder investigation when Whitney is found dead in a motel, forcing the team to find out who killed her and why.
27	4	"Prodigy"	Paul Holahan	Maria Maggenti & Judy Sachs	October 23, 2003	176404	14.72
Natasha Tzetcovich, a teenage violinist goes missing from a concert hall before a big show. The mess in her dressing room suggests she has been abducted after a struggle, and this theory gains weight when the team discover she has recently been stalked by a fan with an unusual obsession with her. However, the girls' violin is also taken and the agents learn that it is worth half a million dollars. Martin goes undercover in order to track down the violin, and when he finally does, more shady characters appear as suspects. Questions arise about connections Natasha's parents have Russian gangsters. However, when information is provided by the missing girl's boyfriend, the teenage son of her manager, it becomes obvious that the girl is desperately unhappy with her life and may have been looking for a way out, and when Vivian finds drugs in her bedroom, it seems that anything is possible. When the shocking identity of the stalker is revealed the team realize they must find him in order to find the missing girl.
28	5	"Copycat"	Tim Matheson	Jennifer Levin	October 30, 2003	176405	15.59
Doris Lovett, a mother from a small town, is abducted in the middle of the day after returning home from food shopping. Her car is found unlocked and her baby daughter is found crying in the backseat. When Jack realizes that the case bears startling similarities to a serial killer case he dealt with years earlier that took place in the same town, he and Martin go to visit the man responsible for the earlier crimes. When he reviews tapes from the prison visits to the killer, he discovers that man behind the current abduction, his prior nemesis, Graham Spaulding. Spaulding has recently been released from custody and has a new obsession: ruining Jack's life. The team race against time to find the missing woman before Spaulding's evil plan can be realised. Jack and Spaulding eventually face each other in a tense showdown, settling their personal war once and for all.
29	6	"Our Sons and Daughters"	Paul Holahan	John Bellucci	November 6, 2003	176407	18.45
Ethan Sawyer, a high school student goes missing from his home. Hours earlier he had returned to the house with cuts and bruises on his face and the team speculate that he may have had some personal trouble. It isn't long before it is discovered that, behind the seemingly idyllic life the missing boy is leading, lies a world of teenage orgies, drug abuse and accusations of other criminal activity. The squad must unravel the mysteries in the small town in order to find the boy. Note: In December 2004, this episode's depiction of a teenage orgy caused several CBS affiliates to be fined a total of $3.63 million (later settled to $300,000), due to its airing in the Central and Mountain time zones prior to the safe harbor period of 10:00pm.
30	7	"A Tree Falls"	Rob Bailey	Allison Abner	November 13, 2003	176408	16.32
Nelson Rodriguez, a young Guatemalan boy, is kidnapped in broad daylight in Spanish Harlem by a man driving a black SUV. While investigating the violent disappearance, the team find a world dominated by illegal immigrants and the 'coyotes' who smuggle them over the border. The search is greatly hindered when hardly any witnesses come forward, for fear that they will be deported when they talk to the authorities. Even the boy's family are initially reluctant to report the disappearance. The squad speculate that a 'coyote' may be to blame for the kidnapping, but another theory emerges that suggests that the missing boy's desperate plan to save his family may have led him down an even darker path. During the case, Martin discovers a ten year old girl who has had her left ear cut off. Enraged, Martin shoots a suspect in cold blood, killing the man with Martin and Viv realizing that they need to get their stories straight or risk bringing an investigation down onto the team.
31	8	"Trip Box"	David Nutter	Simon Mirren	November 20, 2003	176409	15.74
Scott McAllister, a heroic fireman, who just saved his two best friends, also firemen, from a serious fire at a warehouse, goes missing on the way home from the blaze. Evidence suggests that the blaze was deliberately started and when it is discovered that the missing man took evidence from the scene that would've backed up the arson theory, the team focuses on his friends at the station. It isn't long before information surfaces that links the firemen with a network of underground gambling involving the owners of the warehouse and when it is discovered that there were problems with debt and infidelity among the firemen, the team begins to wonder whether the disappearance may have been intentional. They must then balance their need for the truth with their respect for the fire service.
32	9	"Moving On"	John Peters	David H. Goodman	December 11, 2003	176410	16.40
Lianna Sardo, a successful and dedicated neurosurgeon goes missing after an evening run with her ex-husband. Jack is instantly suspicious of the friendly nature of her relationship with her ex, but soon other suspects emerge, including a patient's grieving family, another doctor at the hospital, and a patient with a junkie boyfriend, known to have been personally involved with the missing doctor. However, when the team discover that the doctor gave up a baby for adoption over 20 years ago, and that she recently tried to make contact with her daughter, they begin to think that the missing woman may have been struggling emotionally recently and that she may have been manipulated by someone with information about her daughter. Samantha must balance her loyalty to her job with her own feelings, triggered by aspects of the case.
33	10	"Coming Home"	Tony Wharmby	Jan Nash	December 18, 2003	176411	19.35
Luke Horton, a successful young man goes missing from his high school reunion. Because of the timing of his disappearance, the team initially suspect that old school rivalries may be to blame. However, when information surfaces that suggests the missing man may have been having troubles both at work and in his personal life, they are forced to consider that his disappearance might have been of his own making. When Danny and Samantha discover what may be a suicide note at a local motel, they begin to search the local area for a body. Upon closer inspection however, the team realize that the note is in fact the man's way of telling his wife a devastating secret that would effectively end their marriage. Telephone records and witness accounts lead the team to one of two remaining suspects and they must work with both to get to the truth.
34	11	"Exposure"	Charles Correll	Dale Kutzera	January 8, 2004	176406	18.18
Brian Owen, a paparazzi photographer known for his ability to get any shot, goes missing from outside a hotel. The team initially suspect that his disappearance could be related to controversial photographs he had taken, especially when they discover a set used to expose a celebrity's true sexuality, an act which led the actor into a fatal downward spiral. However, when a further set of photos taken by Brian surface in a magazine that he had no contact with, the team are led to another suspect, a rival photographer. Further information suggests that Brian, who had expressed a strong desire to leave the celebrity business, had recently been involved with a radical environmental group and when a link is found between a target of the group and the location of Brian's disappearance, the team must race against time to find the missing man.
35	12	"Hawks and Handsaws"	Kevin Hooks	Jennifer Levin & Ed Redlich	January 15, 2004	176412	17.42
Joe Gibson, a young talented lawyer working for legal aid, goes missing late at night. A witness reported hearing gunshots in an alley and seeing Joe frantically running away from the scene. When the team find evidence of a shooting, using forensics, they track down the owner of the gun that was fired, and find that it was a former client of Joe's. Upon speaking to the man, they discover that Joe had been panicked when they last met up and was ranting about a man named Peterson. He took the gun from his client, leading the team to believe that he may have been the one who fired it. The team search for the elusive 'Peterson' as the client is not the only one who had reported Joe mentioning him. Jack's intuition however, leads the team to suspect that Joe's real problems might be related to his mental health, and this theory gains ground when the squad speaks to Joe's sister and are informed about a family history of schizophrenia with Jack realizing that Joe may be suffering from undiagnosed paranoid schizophrenia. After digging into his recent files, the agents discover that the missing man had uncovered important evidence related to a two-year-old missing person's case involving a small child, one in which another client of Joe's, Fred Watkins (David Hewlett) was a suspect. The investigation later takes a turn when Sophie Holtzmann, the young daughter of Joe's boss, is kidnapped from outside her home by an increasingly disturbed Joe, and the team must race against time to fit all the pieces of the puzzle together in order to save Joe and Sophie, and possible solve the old case while finding a way to bring Watkins to justice.
36	13	"Life Rules"	John F. Showalter	Story by : Melissa Maxwell & Erika Johnson and Hank Steinberg; Teleplay by : Hank Steinberg	January 29, 2004	176413	17.48
Will Sterling, a successful self-help guru, is kidnapped on his way to the airport. The team suspect somebody who works with Will may be responsible for the disappearance, after it emerges that in order to pull off the kidnapping, inside information about the missing man's travel plans would've been needed. However, when the team discover that Will's rags-to-riches story isn't entirely as it seem, they suspect that the kidnapping might not be a kidnapping after all, and that it all may have been orchestrated by the missing man and his brother for publicity purposes. When a ransom tape is received at the company's headquarters, witnesses reveal that any plan Will had formulated for the 'kidnapping' may have gone seriously wrong. Without knowing who is telling the truth, or even being certain of true identities, the team struggle to find where the truth lies and exactly who is guilty of what offence.
37	14	"The Line"	Paul Holahan	Greg Walker & Alexis Genya	February 5, 2004	176414	18.92
Jessica Prince, a former NYPD police officer turned bounty hunter, is shot while trying to track down a criminal who has skipped bail. The team find her blood outside the criminal's house, but there is no sign of the missing woman. Suspects in the case include Larry Andrews, a man who worked with Jessica as a bounty hunter, and two men who blame her for sending them to prison, one of whom accused her of planting a gun in his apartment. However, when the team uncover some serious police corruption at Jessica's old precinct, they suspect that she may have found out some information that has put her life in jeopardy. Jack puts his job on the line to gain crucial information and the team must race against time to figure out a code Jessica left that may identify her current location.
38	15	"Wannabe"	David M. Barrett	Hank Steinberg	February 12, 2004	176415	20.12
Eric Miller, a middle school misfit goes missing from his school after requesting permission from his teacher to use the bathroom. When the team arrive, they find a smashed mirror and blood on the wall. Initially they suspect that the disappearance is a kidnapping, but when disturbing photographs of the missing boy are found on the computer of a student who bullied him, the team divert their focus to other children at the school. Evidence emerges that suggests that during the 24 hours prior to the disappearance, the boy had been assaulted in the school bathroom by a bully and tied up and tortured by the popular girls wearing only his underwear, and that he has become increasingly desperate to outrun the intense shame he now feels. The team must track him down before he has a chance to harm those responsible, or even himself. Jack uses his own experiences as a father of young daughters to determine that one of the girls involved is lying. Jack and Danny face a last minute desperate attempt at a happy ending.
39	16	"Risen"	Tony Wharmby	David H. Goodman	February 19, 2004	176416	20.12
Jessica Raab, a troubled young woman, has been missing for four years, when Vivian uncovers a new clue in the case she has always refused to give up on. The clue, a fingerprint from a new crime that matches one left in Jessica's apartment at the time of her disappearance, leads the team to uncover a tainted personal life they didn't know about the first time they searched for the missing woman. Jessica, a former prostitute turned coffee shop assistant, was a sex addict who was trying to change her life, and her desperation to put right the mistakes in her past may have caused her untold trouble. A trail of childhood abuse, depression, and a religious cult, lead the team to wonder if Jessica's pursuit of a better life may have directed her into more trouble than she could possibly have anticipated. The team hope that in looking for Jessica, they may also be able to help others who were sucked into the cult the way Jessica herself may have been.
40	17	"Gung Ho"	Paul Holahan	Dale Kutzera & Simon Mirren	February 26, 2004	176417	16.98
Kevin Grant, a soldier, recently back in New York following an injury sustained while on duty in Iraq, goes missing from his home. Problems in the missing man's relationship with his fiance, and some serious financial troubles, lead the team to believe that the key to solving the case may lie within the soldier's own troubled personal life. When evidence suggests that vital information relating to the disappearance may be found in some secretive activities amongst soldiers serving in Iraq, Jack and Danny are forced to travel to Tikrit to find out what really happened before the missing man was sent home. When it emerges that a fellow soldier has ties to several bank robberies in the area during the past few years, the team suspect that the missing man may have become involved in a scheme to lift his family out of financial ruin, and possibly save his relationship with his fiance.
41	18	"Legacy"	Tim Matheson	Allison Abner & Maria Maggenti	March 11, 2004	176418	19.68
George Stanley goes missing after fighting with his wife and leaving her business to deposit a large sum at the bank. Evidence uncovered suggests connections to drug dealers and other criminals, but after a troubled family history emerges, the team begin to suspect that the missing man may have left of his own accord. When some painful family secrets are revealed, the team must find out whether the missing man has been targeted by some shady characters or whether he has purposely set out to bury some ghosts forever. During the case, Danny is confronted by his own ghosts, in the form of his imprisoned brother. He meets his nephew for the first time and must decide whether he's ready to deal with his past and help his brother.
42	19	"Doppelgänger"	Andy Wolk	Hank Steinberg	April 1, 2004	176419	18.12
Julie Cochran, a marine biology student goes missing from a party held for her before she embarks on a new project. The team initially suspect that her boyfriend may be responsible, but when they meet his identical twin brother, they realise that he may actually be the true culprit. Witnesses report hearing an argument between the missing woman and her boyfriend that may have been about the brother and when Martin digs into the past of the two men, he finds several disappearances that could be related to the current one the team are investigating. The team must race against time to discover which brother is truly responsible.
43	20	"Shadows"	Randy Zisk	Jennifer Levin & Jan Nash	April 15, 2004	176420	17.13
Martin enlists Sam's help to search for his aunt, who goes missing after arguing with a man in her own back garden. She is suffering from cancer, and evidence surfaces that leads Sam and Martin to believe her disappearance may be related to her own disease, as well as other patients. The two agents uncover some secrets that will change Martin's family forever. Meanwhile, Jack deals with some devastating news about his father, and attempts to bond with him by getting his hair cut.
44	21	"Two Families"	John F. Showalter	Ed Redlich	April 29, 2004	176421	16.70
Mark Wilson, the father of a death row inmate goes missing after hearing that his son's final appeal has been turned down. The son will be executed in two days time for a triple murder that he has always claimed he is innocent of, and the team suspect that the father's despair over the impending date may have led to his disappearance. However, when evidence surfaces that suggests the missing man may have discovered new information about his son's case, the agents are forced to think again. When they finally work out exactly what he was focusing on, they must mount a desperate race against time to save both father and son. An unlikely suspect in the disappearance surfaces, who may have had a desperate desire to deny justice for the missing man's son.
45	22	"The Season"	Tim Matheson	Story by : Greg Walker; Teleplay by : Jennifer Levin & Jan Nash	May 6, 2004	176422	16.04
The team looks for Jim Cooper, a college football coach who goes missing after being fired, apparently for his role in the team's dismal season performance. However, the investigation soon uncovers that the coach's new policy of suspending players who had academic and behavioral issues caused the football team to repeatedly play without its main players and suffer defeats. The team are confronted with multiple strong suspects, including suspended players, school administrators and even a high-stakes gambler, all of whom are facing financial losses in the wake of the team's losing streak. However, when the squad find evidence that the coach was having an affair with a married woman, this shocking news leads them to uncover evidence that more than one suspect has lied to them. The investigation is complicated with the news that the coach had a secret son that even he wasn't aware of until recently, and that the son is a member of the team. A shocking confession from a suspect leads them to the truth. Meanwhile, Jack's wife is offered a new job in Chicago, and Jack must decide whether he wants to locate with her and their children.
46	23	"Lost and Found"	Hank Steinberg	Hank Steinberg	May 13, 2004	176423	17.73
Serene Andrews, a 16-year-old girl turns up at the FBI offices, claiming she may have been kidnapped 13 years earlier. When the team look into the case, they initially believe that she is mistaken, but a simple slip-up by the woman who claims to be the girl's birth mother leads them to think otherwise. The agents soon discover a network of shady adoptions, all connected to one man. Back in the office, Jack tells the team he has decided to move to Chicago. They are all shocked, but Sam is particularly devastated, leading Martin to realise the truth of Sam and Jack's past relationship.
47	24	"Bait"	Paul Holahan	Story by : Dale Kutzera & Simon Mirren; Teleplay by : Jan Nash & Greg Walker	May 20, 2004	176424	19.62
The team searches for a Erica Palmer and her two children, Harley and Matt. They are last seen boarding a yacht which is later found adrift in New York's Harbor with only its dead captain aboard. The family's extreme wealth leads the team to believe a ransom call may be due to Benjamin, the anxious father of the family. But it is a set of photos, taken by a business rival, which provides the most clues. When the young son of the family is found floating in a dinghy, the team are able to obtain essential information that leads them to believe the family was not actually the target of the apparent kidnapping, but rather the boat itself. Meanwhile, the team goes to a bar to raise a toast to Jack, who is due to leave the squad in Vivian's hands the next day. As they leave the bar, Sam and Martin's relationship takes a huge step forward when she asks him to go home with her. Back at the Malone house, Maria devastates Jack with the news that she no longer wants to be married to him, and intends to take their daughters to Chicago without him.
