= Without a Trace season 1 =

Without a Trace
- Season 1
- DVD cover
- Starring: Anthony LaPaglia; Poppy Montgomery; Marianne Jean-Baptiste; Enrique Murciano; Eric Close
- No. of episodes: 23

Release
- Original network: CBS
- Original release: September 26, 2002 – May 15, 2003

Season chronology
- Next → Season 2

The first season of Without a Trace premiered September 26, 2002 on CBS and concluded on May 15, 2003. There are 23 episodes in this season. It was released on DVD in region 1 on September 14, 2004. In region 2, the first season was released on DVD in the UK on January 10, 2005 and in Germany on February 25, 2005. In region 4 the first season was released on December 12, 2004.

== Cast ==
- Anthony LaPaglia as FBI Missing Persons Unit Supervisory Special Agent John Michael "Jack" Malone
- Poppy Montgomery as FBI Missing Persons Unit Special Agent Samantha "Sam" Spade
- Marianne Jean-Baptiste as FBI Missing Persons Unit Special Agent Vivian "Viv" Johnson
- Enrique Murciano as FBI Missing Persons Unit Special Agent SA Danny Taylor
- Eric Close as FBI Missing Persons Unit Special Agent Martin Fitzgerald

== Crew ==
Writers:

- Hank Steinberg (8 episodes)
- Ed Redlich (3 episodes)
- Greg Walker (3 episodes)
- Allison Abner (2 episodes)
- Jacob Epstein (2 episodes)
- Jan Nash (2 episodes)
- Francisco Castro (1 episodes)
- Steven Kane (1 episode)
- Harry Litman (1 episode)
- Maria Maggenti (1 episode)
- Stacy Rukeyser(1 episodes)

Directors:

- Paul Holahan (5 episodes)
- Peter Markle (4 episodes)
- David Nutter (2 episodes)
- Randall Zisk (2 episodes)
- Charlie Correll (1 episode)
- Kevin Hooks (1 episode)
- Mel Damski (1 episode)
- Steve Gormer (1 episodes)
- Leslie Libman (1 episode)
- Michelle MacLaren (1 episode)
- John McNaughton (1 episode)
- Tom McLoughlin (1 episode)
- Deran Sarafian (1 episode)
- Rachel Talalay (1 episodes)

== Episodes ==
No. overall	No. in season	Title	Directed by	Written by	Original release date	Prod. code	U.S. viewers (millions)
1	1	"Pilot"	David Nutter	Hank Steinberg	September 26, 2002	475182	16.21
The missing persons team, complete with new recruit Martin, is dispatched to find missing Maggie Cartwright (Arija Bareikis), a twenty-something marketing executive. At first, she appears to have everything, including a successful career and two loving divorced parents, but when the squad, led by Jack, digs deeper, agents discover that Maggie was desperately unhappy with several aspects of her life; not only did she have a checkered dating history, including a relationship with a married co-worker, but she was also involved with drugs. The team suspects that Maggie may have been suicidal, but changes its theory when an emailed ransom note, complete with proof of life, arrives at Maggie's mother's home. The kidnapper is demanding $1 million in return for Maggie's release, and the team must battle against time to save her. Martin makes a crucial mistake on his first day.
2	2	"Birthday Boy"	David Nutter	Hank Steinberg	October 3, 2002	175651	14.53
Gabe Freedman vanishes on his 11th birthday, on the way to a baseball game at Yankee Stadium with his dad, Bob. The two of them are accidentally separated at the train station, and Bob assumes that Gabe will get off the train at the next stop and wait for him. When he arrives there and finds no trace of his son, he goes onto Yankee Stadium to search. His son is not there either. Clues surface during the subsequent investigation that suggest Gabe may have left voluntarily, but when the team find out some surprising details about his family, it leads them to think again. Emails, instant messaging, and some strange activity from Gabe suggests that he may have been manipulated by someone preying on some of his insecurities. In an attempt to get out of Jack's doghouse, Martin makes a risky move to save Gabe.
3	3	"He Saw, She Saw"	Rachel Talalay	Jan Nash	October 10, 2002	175653	15.94
Emily Muller is kidnapped from a parking lot after shopping in the nearby mall. Her husband, Duncan, is just yards away at the time, and despite a chase, he is unable to save his wife when she is driven away at high speed in her own car. At first, the team suspect that it may have been a carjacking gone wrong, but when a witness suggests that Emily may have recognised the assailant, they think again. The team uncover some secrets in the Muller household which lead them to believe that Duncan may be involved, especially when they discover that his business is in very serious financial trouble. However, some clever detective work from Martin changes things and the investigation is quickly diverted.
4	4	"Between the Cracks"	Steve Gomer	Ed Redlich	October 17, 2002	175654	14.84
Eve Cleary, a 19-year-old aspiring model, goes missing, but the team have trouble working out exactly when she disappeared. Their work is complicated further when it becomes obvious that there are very few people who actually knew Eve, and therefore, evidence and witness accounts are hard to come by. The team are surprised to learn, following Sam's intuitive work, that Eve is actually missing twice, under two different identities. After finally working out the day she vanished, the squad must decipher truth from fiction in order to solve the case. Also, Chet Collins makes his first appearance as the father determined to discover the truth behind his two-year-old son's disappearance, five years earlier.
5	5	"Suspect"	Peter Markle	Allison Abner	October 24, 2002	175657	15.75
17-year-old Andy Deaver disappears from a private boarding school. Jack immediately suspects that the school's headmaster, Graham Spaulding, is responsible, and the team must tread very carefully around him in order to not show that he is the focus of their investigation, in the hope that he might lead them to where Andy is. Evidence from other students at the school, and a very risky investigative move by Danny, helps the agents uncover Spaulding's real character as Jack enters a race against time, and in defiance of his bosses instructions, to find the missing boy he feels is still alive.
6	6	"Silent Partner"	Randy Zisk	Greg Walker	October 31, 2002	175655	15.50
Patrick Kent, an executive of a New York firm chaired by his father-in-law, goes missing in an airport in San Diego. Danny and Martin are dispatched to investigate in San Diego, and when they find that the two suitcases Patrick took to the airport were empty, they begin to unravel a web of lies that involve almost all aspects of the troubled man's life. It isn't long before the team realise that nothing about Patrick is as it first appears and the further the investigation goes, the more it seems that Patrick might have felt trapped by his life and had been searching for a way out.
7	7	"Snatch Back"	Leslie Libman	Stacy Rukeyser	November 7, 2002	175656	14.57
Abby Buckman, the three-year-old daughter of ADA Angela Buckman and her NYU lecturer husband Matthew, vanishes on a trip to the park with her nanny. The team suspects that Angela's work may be the cause of her little girl's disappearance, especially after she tells them she was threatened on the street by a man only days earlier. However, when they discover that Matthew had been unfaithful to Angela before Abby's birth, they speculate that the student he had an affair with, who has recently been back in contact with him, could also be to blame. Despite many sightings and pieces of evidence that come into the office, the team hit a wall with every inquiry. That is until Jack and Sam look again at the bare facts of the case and propose that Abby may not have been the target of the kidnapper at all.
8	8	"Little Big Man"	Paul Holahan	Jacob Epstein	November 14, 2002	175658	15.41
William Hope, a teenager living in a foster home, goes missing after leaving his job at a burger restaurant late at night. The team at first speculate that he may have run away, but when they discover he has an older brother, Aaron, who was convicted of some serious criminal activity, they think again. Jack battles to get William's profile into the media, but has a hard time doing so until evidence surfaces that suggests that William and Aaron may have involved themselves in gun crime.
9	9	"In Extremis"	Peter Markle	Francisco Castro	November 21, 2002	175659	13.94
Anwar Samir, a doctor of Saudi Arabian descent, goes missing from the hospital where he works. There is speculation that he may be involved in terrorist activities and Jack calls in help from a specialist squad. The team attempt to handle the case from a neutral perspective, while balancing the young doctor's future career against the potential for terrorist action. Ultimately, it is revealed that Anwar was trying to prevent the bombing of a hospital, perpetrated by someone he once considered a friend, and is killed by the FBI while trying to evacuate the hospital, on the go-ahead of Jack.
10	10	"Midnight Sun"	Michelle MacLaren	Hank Steinberg	December 12, 2002	175652	14.83
Greg Pritchard and his small daughter Kyla go missing while on the morning school run. Despite the proclamation from Kyla's mother Sarah that all is good with her family, the team suspects that something is going on below the surface, especially when they uncover information that suggests Greg is far from the model citizen all who knew him make him out to be. Following witness reports, a web of lies and secrecy is revealed, a web that includes connections to drug dealers and a high-profile murder case. When Jack and his squad dig into Greg's murky past, they discover that the key to solving the case could lie in the FBI building, specifically within the Witness Protection Program.
11	11	"Maple Street"	John McNaughton	Maria Maggenti	January 9, 2003	175660	16.34
13-year-old Annie Miller disappears from a bus stop after missing the bus to school. Annie's video camera is found by the side of the road shortly afterwards and the team hope that it may hold clues. Suspects emerge quickly, including Annie's Godfather and the town mayor, and the team recruit Annie's best friend, Siobhan Arintero, to help the investigation as they believe she may hold vital clues. However, when Siobhan goes missing exactly 24 hours after Annie, the investigation is heightened and the only clues the team now have are a series of videos made by both the girls. Sam dedicates herself to hunting through hours and hours of video footage in the hope that she may uncover something that will save two lives. Note: This is similar to the Miranda Gaddis and Ashley Pond disappearance and murder case.
12	12	"Underground Railroad"	Tom McLoughlin	Hank Steinberg	January 16, 2003	175662	17.51
Kathy Dobson, eight and a half months pregnant, goes missing from a hospital after a check up, unaware that she has pre-eclampsia, a condition that could be life-threatening to both her and her baby. Initially, there are very few clues to the motive for her disappearance, but after some odd behaviour from her husband, and speculation by her brother-in-law, the team uncover a very secret 'underground railroad' that helps abused women start new lives away from their partners. Armed with the knowledge that Kathy is likely hidden somewhere within this network, Vivian goes undercover in a life or death race against time to find the missing woman and save both her and her unborn child.
13	13	"Hang On to Me"	Paul Holahan	Ed Redlich	January 30, 2003	175661	16.59
Chet Collins is still searching for his son since the little boy, Sean, went missing five years earlier, at the age of two. Now Chet himself is missing. The team speculate that recent activities in his personal life, combined with his continued desperation over Sean, may have ushered him into some illegal activity, especially when they discover he had recently purchased a gun and developed an urgent need for large sums of money. However, when they receive information from a private investigator that suggests Chet may have found new evidence in his son's case, their focus is redirected. The squad must track down Chet and then put all their resources into solving Sean's case once and for all. Jack deals with his own guilt over a recent meeting with Chet that didn't end well.
14	14	"The Friendly Skies"	Paul Holahan	Hank Steinberg	February 6, 2003	175663	15.03
Linda Schmidt, an unlucky in love flight attendant, goes missing after leaving her apartment for a late night flight. After the team find her car abandoned and unlocked, evidence surfaces that suggests Linda's disappearance may be connected to the case of a woman found murdered two weeks earlier. However, when the missing woman's flatmate tells the squad that Linda was having an affair with a married man and was confronted by his wife recently, the focus of the investigation is shifted. Jack gets help from Linda's psychiatrist and soon suspects that he may be hiding more than his patient's confidentiality. The team are suddenly confronted with two strong suspects, and must play one off against the other to determine the truth and discover Linda's whereabouts.
15	15	"There Goes the Bride"	Deran Sarafian	Steven Kane	February 20, 2003	175665	17.78
Audrey Rose, a society bride, disappears from her own wedding reception. The team find that she may not be as innocent as she seems, and that she has a tainted past involving drugs that her husband, Charlie Beckworth, may or may not know about. When Audrey's wedding planner tells the squad that the missing woman received a threatening phone call, they investigate further and uncover a blackmail plot involving infidelity. However, the key to solving the case lies in a family secret that the Beckworths will do anything to keep hidden. Vivian's intuition leads the team in the right direction.
16	16	"Clare de Lune"	Mel Damski	Allison Abner	February 27, 2003	175664	18.80
Clare Metcalf, recently admitted to a psychiatric hospital, escapes from the facility's supposedly safe 'time-out room'. There is speculation that the missing girl may have been the victim of an abusive staff member, but when evidence comes in from Clare's boyfriend and then her father, it seems that the truth may lie with a secret Clare has tried desperately to keep quiet since the death of her mother years earlier. When a witness calls in a definite sighting of the missing teenager, the team race against time to find her and stop her from hurting herself and others.
17	17	"Kam Li"	Randy Zisk	Jacob Epstein	March 13, 2003	175666	15.38
John 'Bull' Carver, a recently retired US Army officer, disappears from a dinner given in his honor by some former platoon friends. The team investigate all those present at the dinner, including a congressman, and when one attendee commits suicide before he can be questioned, the team realize that something very sinister might be going on. When evidence is found that suggests Bull's disappearance is related to an incident during the Vietnam War, they must confront the Army's strict code of silence to reveal the truth and find the missing man.
18	18	"The Source"	Peter Markle	Jan Nash & Greg Walker	April 3, 2003	175667	13.78
Delia Rivers, an investigative television journalist/reporter goes missing from her work offices. Having left Jack multiple messages asking for 'background information', the team speculate that she might have been scared of something. When they realize that her disappearance occurs the same night as a story she produced appears on the news, they worry further for her safety, especially when they realise that the subject of her report was a notorious drug dealer, Freddie Katan. Jack and his squad also discover that Delia was working on a death row case with massive implications for the justice system, and that not only is Freddie Katan connected to the case, but an acquaintance of Jack's might have information that he is hiding for personal reasons.
19	19	"Victory for Humanity"	Charles Correll	Hank Steinberg	April 10, 2003	175668	17.54
Josh Abrams, a dedicated and idealistic teacher, goes missing after leaving the inner-city high school at which he is a respected science teacher. Danny finds a bag of heroin in Josh's apartment and when a student from the school comes forward to say that she saw the missing man deep in conversation with the student body drug connection, that is where the focus of the investigation lies. However, it isn't long before a set of incriminating photos of the teacher surface and the team begin to suspect that he may have got a little bit too personal with one of his students.
20	20	"No Mas"	Paul Holahan	Greg Walker	April 24, 2003	175669	14.02
Dante Jones, a young boxer on the verge of major career success and fame, disappears from his dressing room just minutes before a big fight. At first the team suspect that he got cold feet and ran away or that it is a publicity stunt arranged by a dodgy promoter, but when a security guard confesses that Dante gave him a large sum of money to lie about seeing him leaving, they begin to think something else might be going on. Further investigation uncovers a world of unscrupulous promoters and managers, drug connections and fixed fights. However, the biggest trouble in Dante's life seems to come from an old sibling rivalry that may finally have been settled in an extremely deadly way.
21	21	"Are You Now or Have You Ever Been?"	Peter Markle	Harry Litman & Ed Redlich	May 1, 2003	175672	12.64
Jack and Martin appear in court as witnesses for the prosecution at the pre-trial hearing of Graham Spaulding, the headteacher and paedophile responsible for the disappearance of Andy Deaver. Meanwhile, back at the office, the rest of the squad are under fire too, as the FBI is conducting an internal review of some of their old cases. The investigation threatens to expose the secret of Sam and Jack's past relationship. It isn't long before the agents realize that the focus of the investigation is clearly focused on Jack and that the agent conducting the audit of the files has a very specific agenda in mind. Martin contacts his father in an attempt to uncover the truth. Note: This episode did not start until 10:27 pm due to an 87 minute long episode of Survivor: The Amazon that started at 8 pm that night.
22	22	"Fall Out (Part I)"	Kevin Hooks	Hank Steinberg	May 8, 2003	175670	14.92
Sydney Harrison, the owner of an employment agency whose old office was in the World Trade Center, is kidnapped by a man in the elevator on her way to work. Her workmates soon receive an email demanding a large sum of money for Sydney's safe return. The team investigate her employees and clients in a bid to discover the identity of her abductor and it isn't long before they stumble upon the truth. Barry Mashburn, a client of Sydney's, had been increasingly desperate for a job since losing his home and his children. The team investigate the current and past circumstances of Barry's life and discover that he lost his wife, Nicole, in the September 11 attacks, and that Sydney was her boss. Barry orders that Sydney's new assistant deliver the ransom money as he will be able to recognize her, and with the help of Sam, a delivery is arranged at a bookshop. The ransom drop goes badly wrong though, and Barry ends up taking the shop's staff and customers hostage. In an ensuing struggle, Sam is shot with her own gun.
23	23	"Fall Out (Part II)"	Paul Holahan	Hank Steinberg	May 15, 2003	175671	15.66
After discovering that Sam has been wounded, Jack puts together a desperate plan in order to get medical attention for her. After his pleas for her release are ignored, he impulsively storms into the bookshop, takes Sam out, and exchanges her as a hostage for himself. He negotiates with Barry to release other hostages and during an emotional conversation with the gunman alone, makes some decisions about his own life and where he really wants to be.
