= Without a Trace season 3 =

Without a Trace
- Season 3
- DVD cover
- Starring: Anthony LaPaglia; Poppy Montgomery; Marianne Jean-Baptiste; Enrique Murciano; Eric Close
- No. of episodes: 23

Release
- Original network: CBS
- Original release: September 23, 2004 – May 19, 2005

Season chronology
- ← Previous; Season 2 Next → Season 4

The third season of Without a Trace premiered September 23, 2004 on CBS and concluded May 19, 2005. There are 23 episodes in this season.

The third season of Without a Trace was released on DVD in region 1 on May 15, 2012, in region 2 in Germany on July 14, 2006, and in the UK on July 24, 2006. In region 4, the third season was released on May 2, 2007.

== Cast ==
- Anthony LaPaglia as FBI Missing Persons Unit Supervisory Special Agent John Michael "Jack" Malone
- Poppy Montgomery as FBI Missing Persons Unit Special Agent Samantha "Sam" Spade
- Marianne Jean-Baptiste as FBI Missing Persons Unit Special Agent Vivian "Viv" Johnson
- Enrique Murciano as FBI Missing Persons Unit Special Agent Danny Taylor
- Eric Close as FBI Missing Persons Unit Special Agent Martin Fitzgerald

== Episodes ==
No. overall	No. in season	Title	Directed by	Written by	Original release date	Prod. code	U.S. viewers (millions)
48	1	"In the Dark"	Paul Holahan	Hank Steinberg	September 23, 2004	2T5151	21.51
The team searches for Kelly Corcoran, a teenage girl who recently went blind (played by sighted actress Angela Goethals). She and her mobility instructor, Luisa Cruz (Iyari Limon), go missing while on a camping trip. The team discover that a boy with a crush on Kelly may hold vital information that could save both the girls. Meanwhile, Vivian is the new supervisor of the team following Jack's imminent departure to Chicago, but for the Malone family, all is not well on the home front. Jack and his lawyer work together after Maria and the children have left, and uncover shocking information that suggests Maria has been consulting a divorce lawyer for months and cruelly been planning to leave Jack in New York, and take his children away. He is clearly devastated by the truth, shocked that Maria has seemingly behaved so coldly.
49	2	"Thou Shalt Not"	Randy Zisk	Jennifer Levin	October 7, 2004	2T5152	21.31
The team searches for Maureen Grady, a nurse's aide in the burn unit of her local hospital. She goes missing on her way home from work one night after stopping on the roadside to change a flat tire. It isn't long before the team discover that all is not as it seems with the devout churchgoer and her husband, Nathan, and their shady past soon reveals that the couple are both on the FBI Wanted list for bombing an abortion clinic years earlier. Jack rejoins the team after telling his New York boss that his wife, Maria, is divorcing him. His former squad are stunned to see him back in the office, and Vivian, the new supervisor is deeply disappointed when told that now Jack is staying in New York senior management insists that he take charge of the team again.
50	3	"Light Years"	Craig Zisk	Greg Walker	October 14, 2004	2T5153	19.35
Teddy Cota, an x-ray technician with a fascination with extraterrestrials, goes missing. After speaking to members of Teddy's friends and family, the team learn that his alien obsession may have to do with events in his childhood that have been muddled. With Jack back in charge the team must decipher fact from fiction in order to track down Teddy before it's too late. Jack and Vivian have a heated argument while driving together, during which Jack is confronted with some very uncomfortable home truths.
51	4	"Upstairs Downstairs"	Timothy Busfield	Hank Steinberg & Judy Sachs	October 21, 2004	2T5154	18.49
June Ojeda, a nanny, goes missing from her wealthy employer's home the same night she is fired for stealing. The child she cared for, Nikki Pierce, also vanishes. At first it seems that June has taken the baby in revenge for losing her job, but all is not as it seems and as the team look deeper into the story, they uncover a sequence of events that points the finger of suspicion at Nikki's parents. A web of lies, weaved with dubiously honorable intentions, must be untangled before the truth can surface.
52	5	"American Goddess"	Tony Goldwyn	Maria Maggenti	October 28, 2004	2T5155	22.06
Lynette Shaw (Elizabeth Berkley), winner of the plastic surgery/makeover TV show 'American Goddess' goes missing from a publicity event. Her dressing room is trashed in an apparent struggle and the team work on a theory that she was abducted. After investigating Lynette's friends and family, they realize that Lynette has personal issues that may have contributed to her disappearance. After discovering the reason she entered into the reality show in the first place, the squad track down two men who may or may not know more than they are telling. Danny remembers a seemingly insignificant comment made by a former workmate of Lynette's, which leads the team to develop a new and potentially deadly theory for the disappearance. They must race to track Lynette down before time runs out.
53	6	"Nickel and Dimed (Part I)"	Martha Mitchell	David Amann	November 4, 2004	2T5156	21.77
Colleen McGrath (Audrey Marie Anderson), a young single mother, goes missing moments after dropping off her son Jake at his babysitter's house. The team discover that Colleen has been struggling with money and has been increasingly desperate to earn extra cash after she lost her cleaning job. Having found out that Jake needs an expensive hearing aid, she has been trying anything in order to make the extra money she needs. It isn't long before evidence turns up that suggests Colleen may have gotten herself involved with some dangerous and violent drug dealers in an attempt to pay for the hearing aid. Samantha gets emotionally involved with the case, a fact that begins to worry both Jack and Martin.
54	7	"Nickel and Dimed (Part II)"	John F. Showalter	Jan Nash	November 11, 2004	2T5157	20.46
Colleen McGrath (Audrey Marie Anderson) is still missing following an encounter with a known drug dealer and suspected murderer. In an effort to find her, Samantha goes undercover to find out vital information from Colleen's colleagues and neighbors who may not be willing to talk to the police or FBI. It isn't long before Samantha finds herself tangled up in the world of drug trafficking from which she was trying to save Colleen. Jack and Martin both jeopardize their jobs in a joint attempt at tracking down a now missing Samantha.
55	8	"Doppelgänger II"	Timothy Busfield	Hank Steinberg	November 18, 2004	2T5158	19.75
A homeless woman goes missing from a hostel and the team is led to re-examine an old case they all know well. Rick and Greg Knowles, twins who were already suspected in a series of brutal murders of homeless women dating back several years, are back in the frame again. Although Greg is currently in prison awaiting trial for the killings, the team suspect, but are having trouble proving, that his brother was actually responsible. Jack leads the charge to make the most of the second chance they have to convict the right man. It isn't long before they realize that to crack the case, they must break down the strong bond between the twins.
56	9	"Trials"	David Von Ancken	David H. Goodman	November 25, 2004	2T5159	19.75
Peter Ducek, an elderly juror, disappears on the same day the jury is dismissed to consider a verdict in a murder case. Initially, Jack and the team suspect that the disappearance is connected to the defendant who has connections to violent gang members and threatened the jury members while in court. However. following interviews with Peter's son, the team begins to believe that the key to finding the missing man may lie in his past, a past that could include connections to Nazi Germany.
57	10	"Malone v. Malone"	Hank Steinberg	Hank Steinberg	December 9, 2004	2T5160	19.49
The team throws a Christmas party and are relieved that they are able to enjoy the season without a missing person's case to solve. Meanwhile, Jack's divorce is moving along, with Maria and her lawyer arriving at the FBI offices for Jack's deposition. Maria forces Jack to relive painful childhood memories in a heartless attempt to gain sole custody of their two young daughters.
58	11	"4.0"	Ken Collins	Jennifer Levin	January 6, 2005	2T5161	23.76
Straight-A student Tara Patterson disappears from a bus stop after talking with friends. On the surface, Tara seems to be a straight-A, high-achieving student with dreams of studying at Harvard, but it isn't long before the team discovers that behind Tara's perfect image lies a hidden life, one that may include drugs and married men. However, the real reason for Tara's disappearance is a secret she has been hiding for months.
59	12	"Penitence"	Scott White	Allison Abner	January 13, 2005	2T5162	18.77
A prison inmate, James MacAvoy, goes missing just weeks before he is due to be released on parole. James' sister contacts Jack's team and begs them to look into it. The prison authorities say that he escaped during a yard fight, but his sister passionately believes otherwise, that he is a reformed character who had "found God". After discovering that James has been an enforcer for a neo-Nazi prison gang, the team find evidence that suggests he may not be the changed man his sister claims, and that he could be involved in a plot to silence a witness to a death row crime, suspected to have been committed by a fellow inmate.
60	13	"Volcano"	John F. Showalter	Greg Walker	February 3, 2005	2T5163	19.33
Ian Norville, an autistic boy, goes missing while on a school trip to the New York Museum of Natural History. Jack instantly suspects Ian's father, Daniel, after he exhibits some odd behavior immediately following the disappearance. It is speculated that after some recent revelations in the Norville family, Daniel may be relieved that Ian is missing, and perhaps even personally involved in the disappearance. As the team investigate further, they suspect that various people close to Ian could be involved. They also learn how difficult it is to raise a disabled child, both for the family, and the child itself.
61	14	"Neither Rain Nor Sleet"	Timothy Busfield	Jan Nash	February 10, 2005	2T5164	19.63
Postal worker Rosie Diaz goes missing during what seemed to be a regular workday, which the team initially connects her disappearance to her cargo, which includes $12,000 worth of a new computer game, which all the kids were after, and what could potentially be thousands of dollars' worth of social security checks. When the team gets in touch with child protective services, they learn that Rosie recently had her foster children taken away after an anonymous abuse call. A search of her home uncovers a DVD containing child pornography, and the team starts to look at the case from another angle. However, it is a dark and disturbing family secret that holds the key to solving the mystery. Vivian learns more about her heart problems, but she keeps it secret from the entire team.
62	15	"Party Girl"	Rob Bailey	Amanda Segal Marks	February 17, 2005	2T5165	21.01
Spoiled celebrity heiress Chelsea Prince is kidnapped from the back of her limousine. Her driver receives life threatening injuries in the attack, but is able to make an emergency call before he passes out. The team finds that Chelsea has a complicated social life and they initially suspect that this may be responsible for her disappearance. However, after learning about a recent spate of selfless behavior on Chelsea's part, they are forced to think again. They are shocked to discover that Chelsea's kidnapper has posted video footage of her, tied up and crying, on the internet, and that he has started an online poll for the public to vote whether she should live or die. After some intense detective work, it emerges that the key to solving the case, and finding Chelsea alive, may lie in some fan letters, written to Chelsea by a 12-year-old girl. Meanwhile, Vivian's heart condition is causing her trouble, something Martin notices.
63	16	"Manhunt"	Jeannot Szwarc	David Amann	February 24, 2005	2T5166	21.37
12-year-old Mike Gerard goes missing, after his mother witnesses a man forcing him into a car. Martin, who is jogging in the area at the time, chases the car for several blocks, but loses it. Initially the team suspects that Mike has been taken by a pedophile, but when Martin's photofit leads them to discover the identity of the man who took Mike, they suspect that he may actually have no intention of harming the child, but instead is using him in an attempt to undo a tragedy that occurred to his own son exactly a year ago. Sam and Martin's relationship suffers a blow when the couple can not agree on a good time to go public with their romance.
64	17	"Lone Star"	Paul Holahan	David Mongan	March 10, 2005	2T5167	23.32
Lance Hamilton, a Texan real estate broker now living in New York, goes missing after showing a property to prospective buyers. Jack and his team suspect that dealings with a low-level gangster, nicknamed Jimmy the Tooth, may provide answers to their many questions, but when they dig a little deeper, they discover connections to an international sex slave trade. However, there is yet more to be revealed, as the team find out that Lance is actually an undercover police officer and that he may have disappeared while trying to do the right thing.
65	18	"Transitions"	Timothy Busfield	David H. Goodman	March 31, 2005	2T5168	21.27
Stephanie Healy, a bank worker, disappears after a rehearsal with her church choir. At first, she seems to be a normal working woman who has devoted herself to her religion, but the team discovers that she has severed all contact with her family and friends and that information about her past is extremely hard to come by. All is definitely not as it seems with Stephanie, and as the team finds out more about her mysterious history, they move closer to finding Stephanie. Vivian's heart condition is revealed to the rest of the team after she collapses while working.
66	19	"Second Sight"	Jeff T. Thomas	Jan Nash	April 14, 2005	2T5170	19.99
A young psychic named Agnes Deschamps goes missing after predicting danger in her own Tarot card reading. Among several clues, the team discover that Agnes had recently developed a desperate need for $50,000, and had been treated in hospital for a fall down a flight of stairs. The team visits the hospital where she was treated where they find out she had other healed bone breaks from previous injuries. A shady past and connections to a group of lawbreaking travelers provides more clues, as does a psychic friend of the missing woman. Meanwhile, the team must cope without Vivian, and try to support her as she faces serious heart surgery.
67	20	"The Bogie Man"	Rob Bailey	Jennifer Levin	May 4, 2005	2T5171	11.93
Seven years ago, a thirteen-year-old girl named Amber Bryce went missing, and suspicion fell on her boyfriend, then-17-year-old Curtis Horne (John Krasinski). When Daisy Thorpe, who had become obsessed with getting justice for Amber's death, also ends up missing in the present day, the team is called in to investigate. While Martin and Danny work from the office, Sam and Jack work in the field, starting their investigation with the local cleric, Amber's father, and trying to find out why Curtis Horne has stayed in town all these years. Some disturbing news from inside the Thorpe home leads the team to believe that Daisy's father may know more than he is telling. While Vivian is home having troubles with Reggie, Martin makes a decision about his relationship with Sam.
68	21	"Off the Tracks"	John F. Showalter	Greg Walker	May 5, 2005	2T5172	17.92
Danny's brother Rafi goes missing from the apartment he shares with his pregnant fiancee and their nine-year-old son. Danny is initially sceptical to hear that Rafi is a changed man, now dedicated to his family, but begins to change his mind when he sees proof that he was making attempts to open his own business. However the ensuing investigation reveals that Rafi has recently had connections with a convicted car thief and that a large sum of money he had that he was planning to use to buy his own business didn't come from the bank. Though Jack points out that Rafi could have very innocent explanations for the suspicious circumstances, Danny can't shake the feeling that his brother may have put himself in harm's way. Eventually, it is his knowledge of his brother's mind that leads him to the knowledge of whether his brother may now be hiding. Danny makes a vow to his soon-to-be sister-in-law that no matter what happens, they will get through it together.
69	22	"John Michaels"	Hank Steinberg	Hank Steinberg	May 12, 2005	2T5169	18.92
The team searches for a 71-year-old retired claims adjuster who was apparently on the verge of suicide, before he was seen getting into a black car and driving off with two unknown men. Jack leads the search, and the more he discovers, the more he finds that there are similarities between the man's mysterious vanishing, and his own life. Martin Landau guest stars as Jack's father.
70	23	"Endgame"	Jeannot Szwarc	David Amann	May 19, 2005	2T5173	21.43
Paige Hobson was last seen sneaking out of her office at the same time as an NYPD detective was asking her boss to direct him to Paige for a routine inquiry. To the team's surprise, the NYPD detective turns out to have been an imposter, causing them to question why Paige chose to run from this mystery man, what he wanted, and if he caught up with her. Further investigation uncovers that the seemingly upstanding and socially conscious Paige was involved in a lucrative identity theft ring with close ties to a terrorist on a watch list who was recently seen in New York with her. Meanwhile, the remaining team members are gravely concerned about Vivian, who is undergoing open-heart surgery on that very day. After receiving good news about Vivian's condition, Danny and Martin, transporting a suspect to another location, suddenly find themselves in the middle of a deadly shootout.
