= Without a Trace season 7 =

Without a Trace
- Season 7
- DVD cover
- Starring: Anthony LaPaglia; Poppy Montgomery; Marianne Jean-Baptiste; Enrique Murciano; Roselyn Sánchez; Eric Close
- No. of episodes: 24

Release
- Original network: CBS
- Original release: September 23, 2008 – May 19, 2009

Season chronology
- ← Previous; Season 6

The seventh and final season of Without a Trace began airing on September 23, 2008 and ended on May 19, 2009. There are 24 episodes in this season. On the morning of the series finale, CBS declined to renew the show for an eighth season, along with The Unit.

For the 2008–09 American television season the seventh season of Without a Trace ranked 18th with an average of 12.97 million viewers.

The seventh season was not released on DVD in Region 1 until April 29, 2014.

== Cast ==
- Anthony LaPaglia as FBI Missing Persons Unit Supervisory Special Agent John Michael "Jack" Malone
- Poppy Montgomery as FBI Missing Persons Unit Special Agent Samantha "Sam" Spade
- Marianne Jean-Baptiste as FBI Missing Persons Unit Special Agent Vivian "Viv" Johnson
- Enrique Murciano as FBI Missing Persons Unit Special Agent SA Danny Taylor
- Roselyn Sánchez as FBI Missing Persons Unit Special Agent Elena Delgado
- Eric Close as FBI Missing Persons Unit Special Agent Martin Fitzgerald

== Episodes ==
No. overall	No. in season	Title	Directed by	Written by	Original release date	Prod. code	U.S. viewers (millions)
137	1	"Closure"	John Polson	Jan Nash & Bruce Ramussen	September 23, 2008	3T7204	11.28
Ryan Mitchell, whose daughter Lindsey went missing years ago, also goes missing, and the team tries to connect his desire to help another couple with a missing son with his disappearance. Jack is trying to adjust to his new boss, Clark Medina.
138	2	"22 x 42"	Greg Walker	Byron Balasco	September 30, 2008	3T7205	12.61
Sara Kent, a rising executive, is abducted from a taxi after attending a rooftop party. The team also continues to learn to adjust to their new boss.
139	3	"Last Call"	Karen Gaviola	David Amann & Byron Balasco	October 14, 2008	3T7201	11.05
Alan Reynolds, a white-collar criminal, goes missing on his way to testify against a former associate and the team must find out why.
140	4	"True/False"	Martha Mitchell	Diego Gutierrez	October 21, 2008	3T7206	11.63
Will Duncan, the teenage son of a Secret Service agent, disappears and a long-festering secret that set a deadly chain of events in motion is discovered.
141	5	"Rise and Fall"	Jonathan Kaplan	David Amann	October 28, 2008	3T7207	12.19
Martin is left on his own to solve the disappearance of Arianna Murphy, a victim's advocate from the scene of a double homicide, when Agent Medina diverts the rest of the team to investigate the abduction of a little girl from a mall.
142	6	"Live to Regret"	John F. Showalter	Gwendolyn M. Parker	November 11, 2008	3T7208	12.23
Erin MacNeil, a bank manager, disappears and the team uncovers a dark secret during their investigations. Jack returns to his job as head of the department.
143	7	"Rewind"	Karen Gaviola	Bruce Ramussen	November 18, 2008	3T7209	11.85
The squad discovers a shocking truth during an investigation of Chris Howe, a missing paraplegic recently injured in a car accident. The team also continues to adjust to normal with Jack back as the head of the department.
144	8	"Better Angels"	Scott White	Jan Nash & Greg Walker	November 25, 2008	3T7210	10.42
The team's latest case sends Jack and Sam to Los Angeles in search for Robb Simms, a man who went missing after his employee's funeral. Investigations in New York and California reveal a coast-to-coast mystery. Jack and Sam rekindle their relationship.
145	9	"Push Comes to Shove"	John F. Showalter	Diego Gutierrez & Alicia Kirk	December 2, 2008	3T7202	12.32
Doctor Erica Loza goes missing shortly after treating a patient and the team suspects a secret from her past is connected to her disappearance.
146	10	"Cloudy with a Chance of Gettysburg"	Scott White	Story by : Gwendolyn M. Parker & Amanda Segel Marks; Teleplay by : David Amann & Jan Nash	December 16, 2008	3T7203	14.48
TV weatherman, Ben Coleman arrives at work bleeding from his side and the team tries to beat the clock to find out what that has to do with his disappearance.
147	11	"Wanted"	Marianne Jean-Baptiste	Alicia Kirk	January 6, 2009	3T7211	13.13
A case about Daphne Stevens, a missing teenager last seen with her bipolar mother, gets twisted when the team finds she has a secret life. Jack and Sam's relationship hits a bump.
148	12	"Believe Me"	Paul McCrane	Jan Nash & Bruce Rasmussen	January 13, 2009	3T7213	12.42
The team searches for Ken Gilroy, a bar owner, who goes missing shortly after his statue of St. Theresa cries. Brian's visit to Sam takes a new turn.
149	13	"Once Lost"	Martha Mitchell	Story by : Diego Gutierrez & Roselyn Sanchez; Teleplay by : Diego Gutierrez & Jim Adler	January 27, 2009	3T7212	13.00
Elena is forced to face the consequences of her past as the team is put on the case to search for Bianca Gonzalez, Elena's former partner in the police force, who went missing during an undercover sting.
150	14	"Friends and Neighbors"	John F. Showalter	Amanda Segel Marks	February 3, 2009	3T7214	12.16
The team searches for Julie Fisher and Cate Conelly. The two neighbours were abducted from their homes. The case twists and turns when the agents learn the identity of the kidnapper.
151	15	"Chameleon"	Eric Close	Byron Balasco	February 10, 2009	3T7215	14.31
Jay Lester, a man faking his identity and posing as a college student, disappears and the team must decipher his secrets in order to find him.
152	16	"Skeletons"	Nancy Van Doornewaard	Story by : Diego Gutierrez & Gwendolyn M. Parker; Teleplay by : Diego Gutierrez & Bruce Rasmussen	February 17, 2009	3T7216	12.10
Kara Westfield and her son Hayden go missing from the local community centre after a fire alarm clears the building. The team tries to determine if any foul play is involved.
153	17	"Voir Dire"	Jonathan Kaplan	Alicia Kirk	March 17, 2009	3T7217	11.87
Zack Porter, a trial consultant goes missing and the team narrows down the list of suspects as they investigate his disappearance. Martin has a dangerous encounter involving a juror on a trial with which the missing person was recently involved. Sam and Jack learn to deal with Brian spending more time with Finn.
154	18	"Daylight"	Jeff T. Thomas	Greg Walker & Jan Nash	March 31, 2009	3T7218	12.53
Justin Morgan, a psychologist, goes missing right after stopping a woman from jumping off of a building. The team believes that something in the life of the psychologist's brother might have played a role in his disappearance. Martin's relationship with Kim takes a spicy turn.
155	19	"Heartbeats"	Martha Mitchell	Tom Donaghy	April 7, 2009	3T7219	12.15
The suspect list keeps growing as the team investigates the disappearance of Lana Peters, a Russian matchmaker.
156	20	"Hard Landing"	Michael Amundson	David Rapp	April 14, 2009	3T7220	13.23
Keith Anderson, a billionaire's son, disappears after crash landing a small plane in the woods. Kim Marcus returns and her relationship with Martin develops.
157	21	"Labyrinths"	Jonathan Kaplan	Diego Gutierrez & Gwendolyn M. Parker	April 28, 2009	3T7221	12.21
Molly Samson, a journalist, goes missing. The team looks for her after her hardcore exposés are published in an online magazine. They begin to suspect a politician, the subject of one of her latest entries. Meanwhile, Brian remains in Sam and Finn's life.
158	22	"Devotion"	John Polson	Story by : Anthony LaPaglia & Ryan Tavlin; Teleplay by : Byron Balasco & Bruce Ramussen	May 5, 2009	3T7222	11.83
17-year-old Stacey Tan, last seen on video being agitated by her abductor, goes missing and the team must do all they can to find her before it's too late.
159	23	"True"	Eric Close	Alicia Kirk & Jan Nash	May 12, 2009	3T7223	13.40
Jack hesitates to assign the team to the case after Hannah's boyfriend, Shay Hanson (Kendall Schmidt) from Chicago disappears during his stay in New York.
160	24	"Undertow"	Jeannot Szwarc	David Amann & Greg Walker	May 19, 2009	3T7224	11.21
After a late night dive, Derek Wilson disappears and the team tries to determine why. Danny and Elena prepare to make the next step in their relationship, their marriage.
