= Without a Trace season 5 =

Without a Trace
- Season 5
- DVD cover
- Starring: Anthony LaPaglia; Poppy Montgomery; Marianne Jean-Baptiste; Enrique Murciano; Roselyn Sánchez; Eric Close
- No. of episodes: 24

Release
- Original network: CBS
- Original release: September 24, 2006 – May 10, 2007

Season chronology
- ← Previous; Season 4 Next → Season 6

The fifth season of Without a Trace premiered September 24, 2006, on CBS and ended on May 10, 2007. There are 24 episodes in this season. This season includes the 100th episode. For the American 2006–07 television season the fifth season of Without a Trace ranked 16th with an average of 14.7 million viewers and in the 18–49 demographic ranked 28th with a 4.1/11 Rating/Share.

The fifth season of Without a Trace has not been released on DVD in region 1 but was released in region 2 in Germany on July 17, 2009 and in the UK on February 22, 2010. In region 4 the fifth season was released on July 1, 2009 However it was released on Amazon Video in early 2012.

== Cast ==
- Anthony LaPaglia as FBI Missing Persons Unit Supervisory Special Agent John Michael "Jack" Malone
- Poppy Montgomery as FBI Missing Persons Unit Special Agent Samantha "Sam" Spade
- Marianne Jean-Baptiste as FBI Missing Persons Unit Special Agent Vivian "Viv" Johnson
- Enrique Murciano as FBI Missing Persons Unit Special Agent SA Danny Taylor
- Roselyn Sánchez as FBI Missing Persons Unit Special Agent Elena Delgado
- Eric Close as FBI Missing Persons Unit Special Agent Martin Fitzgerald

== Episodes ==
| No. overall | No. in season | Title | Directed by | Written by | Original release date | Prod. code | U.S. viewers (millions) |
|---|---|---|---|---|---|---|---|
| 95 | 1 | "Stolen" | Randy Zisk | David Amann | September 24, 2006 | 2T7852 | 17.56 |
Bryan Parker is questioned by the FBI after being found alone on the road by a police officer, his hand bandaged. He tells them about a young boy his father had abducted and soon the team is searching for the boy, Todd. Sam continues to question Bryan and he identifies a picture of Todd that reveals his true identity to be Daniel Ellison. The team realises that Daniel isn't the first boy that Bryan's father abducted and follow his past to find him and the missing boy.
| 96 | 2 | "Candy" | Jonathan Kaplan | Jan Nash & Greg Walker | October 1, 2006 | 2T7851 | 14.51 |
Cindy "Candy" Peterson, a mother who had become a stripper to support her family, goes missing one night after work and Jack sends Elena undercover at the strip club to learn what she can. Danny moves in to keep an eye on her after someone catches on to Elena spying, while Vivian discovers that Jim Peterson hasn't been completely honest with the team. Jack faces censure from Olczyk over his relationship with Ann and is angry with Ann after she admits to him that she thinks he let their relationship cloud his judgment in the Davis investigation.
| 97 | 3 | "911" | Jeannot Szwarc | Amanda Segel Marks | October 8, 2006 | 2T7853 | 15.27 |
The team searches for Jessica Lawson, a 911 operator who disappeared after a man who knows her called her.
| 98 | 4 | "All for One" | Kate Woods | Byron Balasco | October 15, 2006 | 2T7854 | 15.17 |
The team investigates when Malia Norton, a teenager at a detention centre, disappears after being threatened by one of the other residents. Malia had been involved in a drinking and driving accident that had seriously injured her sister's boyfriend and had killed another young man. The investigation at the detention centre uncovers a lot of secrets that some of the residents would prefer to keep well-hidden.
| 99 | 5 | "The Damage Done" | John Peters | Diego Gutierrez | October 22, 2006 | 2T7855 | 14.79 |
The team investigates when Sadik Marku's son and girlfriend go missing. Samantha worries that Jack is more interested in settling an old score with Marku than with finding the missing woman and boy.
| 100 | 6 | "The Calm Before" | Peter Markle | Jan Nash | October 29, 2006 | 2T7856 | 13.37 |
The team investigates when Aaron Gibbs goes missing. They soon discover that he has been lying to his wife about quitting his job and working nights at a fight club. Jack and the others learn that Aaron's disappearance was connected to events that took place during Hurricane Katrina when Aaron was fighting to save his sons. This is the 100th episode.
| 101 | 7 | "All the Sinners, Saints" | Martha Mitchell | Jose Molina | November 5, 2006 | 2T7857 | 13.02 |
Martin brings the team in on a hunt for Katie Duncan, a young woman that went missing after a priest attempted to exorcise a demon from her. He finds out that he used to work with her and he feels guilty that he doesn't remember her.
| 102 | 8 | "Win Today" | Jeannot Szwarc | David H. Goodman | November 12, 2006 | 2T7858 | 15.22 |
Jack and the team investigate the disappearance of Alex Stark after his girlfriend reports him missing, and soon learn that Alex didn't own a cleaning business as he said he did, but was actually involved in an illegal gambling operation. Jack goes undercover at a club at which Alex would gamble to find out what happened to him, and ends up being taken hostage by Alex's associate, who becomes convinced that Jack is actually there to kill her. Unfortunately for Jack, his team believes that he has changed his cover story and has no idea he's actually been kidnapped.
| 103 | 9 | "Watch Over Me" | Bobby Roth | Byron Balasco & David Mongan | November 19, 2006 | 2T7859 | 14.51 |
The team investigates the disappearance of social worker Eric Hayes who had given thirty days notice to his job not long before. When their investigation leads them to a young pregnant woman who had already lost one child to the system, the agents begin to believe the disillusioned social worker may have been having an affair but soon discover that he may have been trying to right the wrong that drove him from his job. Danny has trouble with the investigation, as it reminds him of his own experience in foster care. Jack confides in Samantha about his relationship with Ann, but it may be too late.
| 104 | 10 | "The Thing with Feathers" | Scott White | Gwendolyn M. Parker | December 3, 2006 | 2T7860 | 14.28 |
Vivian thinks about her recent surgical problems while searching for Audrey West, a woman with a terminal condition.
| 105 | 11 | "Fade-Away" | Jonathan Kaplan | David Amann & Greg Walker | December 10, 2006 | 2T7861 | 13.89 |
Ted Soros disappears after playing in a high school basketball game. As the team investigates they find out that not only did Ted have family issues, but he was also involved with a rape that took place at a university recruiting party he attended. It turns out that he was a witness and wanted to do the right thing by testifying. Meanwhile, Anne tells Jack she lost the baby. Guest star: Nicholas D'Agosto
| 106 | 12 | "Tail Spin" | Peter Markle | Diego Gutierrez | January 7, 2007 | 2T7862 | 14.19 |
Neil Rawlings, an air traffic controller disappears after nearly letting two planes collide on his watch. As the team investigates, they believe that his disappearance may have to do with the death of his wife and his estrangement with his son. However, as they interview his coworkers they realize that the disappearance may have to do with terrorism.
| 107 | 13 | "Eating Away" | Martha Mitchell | David H. Goodman & Alicia Kirk | January 14, 2007 | 2T7863 | 13.39 |
A competitive eating champion, Barry Rosen, vanishes after winning a chili eating contest. Barry gets sick after the competition and his doctor tells him he'll have to quit eating competitively or he'll die from a heart attack or stroke. After he disappears, test results reveal that he got sick due to being poisoned with bleach. The team suspects his competitors. They also investigate the dispute between Barry and his brother. Meanwhile, Carlos, Elena's daughter's father, asks Danny to write a letter on his behalf for the custody hearing with Elena. Guest Star: Nathan Kress
| 108 | 14 | "Primed" | John F. Showalter | Jan Nash | January 21, 2007 | 2T7864 | 13.72 |
Abby Horton, a young artist who creates her art by taking pictures of unsuspecting strangers disappears. The team tries to track down the subjects of her art, suspecting that an outraged one may have come after her.
| 109 | 15 | "Desert Springs" | Eriq La Salle | David Amann | February 18, 2007 | 2T7865 | 11.42 |
The team searches for missing water plant supervisor, Jason Turner, and learn that he had become the target of a lot of anger after recent layoffs at the plant. Carlos, Elena's ex-husband, comes to the office looking for Elena.
| 110 | 16 | "Without You" | Jeannot Szwarc | José Molina | March 4, 2007 | 2T7866 | 14.88 |
Elena is frantic when her daughter Sofie goes missing, and the team has a full schedule as they must also search for a missing female tourist named Jenny.
| 111 | 17 | "Deep Water" | Paul McCrane | Anthony LaPaglia & Byron Balasco | March 11, 2007 | 2T7867 | 17.53 |
Patricia Mills, a newly elected senator goes missing and Jack immediately turns his attention towards her husband.
| 112 | 18 | "Connections" | Rosemary Rodriguez | David Mongan & David H. Goodman | March 18, 2007 | 2T7868 | 13.05 |
The team searches for Rebecca Howard, a fifteen-year-old girl who lived with her grandfather and was last seen at an Internet café. Sam gets an unexpected visit from her estranged sister.
| 113 | 19 | "At Rest" | Jonathan Kaplan | Gwendolyn M. Parker & Jan Nash | March 25, 2007 | 2T7869 | 12.75 |
Sam's darkest secrets are revealed when her sister goes missing and she decides to search for her without the team's help.
| 114 | 20 | "Skin Deep" | Eric Close | Amanda Segel Marks | April 8, 2007 | 2T7870 | 14.12 |
Tess Pratt lets go of her son Andrew's hand for just a moment at the marketplace, but that's all it takes for the six-year-old boy to disappear. After learning that her father-in-law, Joseph, is a well-known white supremacist who was less than thrilled that grandson was interracial, the team initially focuses their suspicion on him, but despite his beliefs, Pratt is adamant that he would never harm his grandson. Vivian tries to keep the young mother calm, and the team hopes to get a lead when they finally get a ransom demand.
| 115 | 21 | "Crash and Burn" | John Polson | David Amann & Alicia Kirk | April 15, 2007 | 2T7871 | 14.31 |
Mark O'Neil, a former soldier, now stuntman, goes missing and the team learns that he changed his will shortly before he disappeared, which makes them wonder who needed the money.
| 116 | 22 | "One and Only" | Kate Woods | Diego Gutierrez & Byron Balasco | April 29, 2007 | 2T7872 | 13.72 |
The team searches for Chris Manning, a family court judge with a soft side who went missing after meeting with a young boy caught between his mother and his abusive father. Suspicion initially turns to anyone Manning may have riled up due to his court rulings, but after his clerk is shot in what appears to be an attempt on Manning's life, the team learns that the secret behind Manning's disappearance is tied up with something that happened over twenty years earlier.
| 117 | 23 | "Two of Us" | John F. Showalter | Greg Walker & José Molina | May 6, 2007 | 2T7873 | 14.71 |
Ella Neese, a high school student goes missing after leaving her prom early to get some rest in her hotel room, leaving behind a bloody dress and a lot of questions about what may have happened to her.
| 118 | 24 | "The Beginning" | Jeannot Szwarc | David H. Goodman & Jan Nash | May 10, 2007 | 2T7874 | 14.31 |
Jennifer Long, a teenage girl disappears after joining a cult. In the office, Elena encounters problems with Carlos in their custody battle for Sofie.
