= Without a Trace season 6 =

Without a Trace
- Season 6
- DVD cover
- Starring: Anthony LaPaglia; Poppy Montgomery; Marianne Jean-Baptiste; Enrique Murciano; Roselyn Sánchez; Eric Close
- No. of episodes: 18

Release
- Original network: CBS
- Original release: September 27, 2007 – May 15, 2008

Season chronology
- ← Previous; Season 5 Next → Season 7

The sixth season of Without a Trace began airing in United States on September 27, 2007. Twelve episodes had been completed before the WGA Strike. A further six episodes were produced after the end of the strike, making this the shortest season of Without a Trace at 18 episodes.

This season included a cross-over with CSI: Crime Scene Investigation involving Jack and Gil Grissom tracking a serial killer from Las Vegas to New York. This established Without a Trace as part of the same fictional universe as the tetralogy of CSI shows and Cold Case.

The sixth season of Without a Trace was not released on DVD in region 1 until May 7, 2013, but was first released in region 2 in Germany on November 20, 2009 on and in the UK on July 5, 2010.

== Cast ==
- Anthony LaPaglia as FBI Missing Persons Unit Supervisory Special Agent John Michael "Jack" Malone
- Poppy Montgomery as FBI Missing Persons Unit Special Agent Samantha "Sam" Spade
- Marianne Jean-Baptiste as FBI Missing Persons Unit Special Agent Vivian "Viv" Johnson
- Enrique Murciano as FBI Missing Persons Unit Special Agent SA Danny Taylor
- Roselyn Sánchez as FBI Missing Persons Unit Special Agent Elena Delgado
- Eric Close as FBI Missing Persons Unit Special Agent Martin Fitzgerald

== Episodes ==
No. overall	No. in season	Title	Directed by	Written by	Original release date	Prod. code	U.S. viewers (millions)
119	1	"Lost Boy"	John Polson	Byron Balasco & Greg Walker	September 27, 2007	3T6104	16.68
Elijah Douglas, the four-year-old adopted son of a celebrity couple, is kidnapped, and the team must determine if the reason has to deal with the parents' status or the boy's own Sudanese origin. They are soon led to a man who was trying to extort the couple claiming to be the child's biological father.
120	2	"Clean Up"	Chris Long	Gwendolyn M. Parker	October 4, 2007	3T6101	14.20
The team considers if Leo Cutler, a father who cleans crime scenes for a living, led to his disappearance with his daughter, Hannah. The case is linked to the daughter's possible sexual assault, and her self-esteem issues about being considered overweight.
121	3	"Res Ipsa"	Greg Walker	Greg Walker	October 11, 2007	3T6102	13.62
The team looks into the disappearance of television reporter Christine Woods and learns that her disappearance is tied to her son's torture and death in a Guatemala prison. Jack is forced to bring in the CIA to help crack the case.
122	4	"Baggage"	Scott White	Diego Gutierrez & Jan Nash	October 25, 2007	3T6103	12.73
Rhonda Brewer disappears after her boyfriend is killed in a police shooting. Agents believe the disappearance is connected to the girl's brother, a notorious gang leader who had a falling-out with her. Later, Sam learns she is pregnant after a one-night stand.
123	5	"Run"	Kate Woods	Jan Nash	November 1, 2007	3T6106	14.58
Kelly Schmidt, later identified as Sue Carlton, disappears after an office shooting, but the case is tied to a custody battle and accusations of molestation.
124	6	"Where and Why"	Jonathan Kaplan	Jan Nash & Greg Walker	November 8, 2007	3T6108	21.69
When a serial killer eludes capture in Nevada and escapes with his son to New York, Jack and the team pick up the trail with the help of CSI Las Vegas team leader Gil Grissom (William Petersen). This episode concludes a crossover with CSI: Crime Scene Investigation that begins on "Who and What".
125	7	"Absalom"	Martha Mitchell	Jose Molina	November 15, 2007	3T6105	14.41
When college student Tom Sweeney disappears after making racial remarks in a class that are posted on the web, the team wonders if those may be directly connected to his disappearance. But the case reveals about the student's racial identity and his real father.
126	8	"Fight/Flight"	Jeannot Szwarc	David H. Goodman	November 22, 2007	3T6107	12.21
The disappearance of ultimate fighter Brett Hendricks leads the team to investigate his background, where they learn the man had a number of enemies. They also learn about his motivation to become a fighter after he was beaten up in school and he was afraid he enjoyed the fighting too much. Sam tracks down her baby's father.
127	9	"One Wrong Move"	Jeff T. Thomas	Gwendolyn M. Parker & Diego Gutierrez	December 6, 2007	3T6109	12.68
When single mother Lindsay Bynum goes missing, the team determines if the ex-con's past criminal activity (embezzlement) caused her to disappear after visiting a prison inmate. Agent Johnson gets a possible break in her case involving the kidnapping of a young woman in a sex trafficking case.
128	10	"Claus and Effect"	Bobby Roth	Alicia Kirk & David Amann	December 13, 2007	3T6110	15.15
Glen Beckett, a child prodigy turned store Santa, vanishes and the team wonders if he had criminal connections. They learn he is a brilliant mathematician who dropped out of college after having a crisis of conscience.
129	11	"4G"	Eric Close	Amanda Segel Marks	January 10, 2008	3T6111	13.83
Malone and his team start off the new year investigating how private investigator Scott Lucas might have gone missing. They learn the investigator had a special bond with a teenager who had a terrible foster home life and the teenager tried to be like the PI.
130	12	"Article 32"	Martha Mitchell	Byron Balasco	January 17, 2008	3T6112	13.29
Laura Richards, a veterans-hospital worker who made the prosthetics for the injured soldiers, disappears. The team learns she was involved in an anti-Iraq war group who is planning a huge explosion, she tried to back out of it after hearing the stories of the injured soldiers.
131	13	"Hard Reset"	John Polson	Jan Nash, David Amann, Greg Walker & José Molina	April 3, 2008	3T6113	15.20
Jack goes missing after taking a case into his own hands which soon becomes intertwined with a human trafficking prostitution case that Vivian is working on.
132	14	"A Bend in the Road"	Jonathan Kaplan	Diego Gutierrez & Amanda Segel Marks	April 10, 2008	3T6114	14.49
While struggling to deal with the aftermath of Jack's accident, the team searches to find Diana Reed, a teen heart transplant recipient, believing her disappearance might be connected to her donor. They learn she was trying to find out as much about her donor as she could. Samantha talks to Brian.
133	15	"Deja Vu"	Chris Long	Byron Balasco & David Amann	April 24, 2008	3T6115	13.47
The team searches for Jay McCann, a coma patient who had woken up after three years only to disappear. The team is led to another missing persons case in which the person disappeared on the same night the patient lapsed into a coma. Jack leaves the hospital and searches for a girl he saved from sex traffickers and then kills her abductor.
134	16	"A Dollar and a Dream"	Martha Mitchell	David H. Goodman & David Mongan	May 1, 2008	3T6116	12.83
After Lacey Moran, the latest lottery winner, goes missing, the team looks at her friends, family, job, and the people she knew. Along the way, the team becomes convinced that the lucky lottery winner wasn't so lucky after all and she might have stolen the ticket. Jack investigates Brian.
135	17	"Driven"	John Polson	Byron Balasco & Gwendolyn M. Parker	May 8, 2008	3T6117	14.67
Connor Baynes, a man who recently saved a child from being hit from a bus, goes missing. The team is led to an old house fire that claimed the lives of two people while the police suspected Baynes set the fire. Jack's mental health is evaluated by a psychiatrist (Linda Hunt) and when Sam confronts Brian about his past he discontinues everything to do with her or his baby.
136	18	"Satellites"	Jonathan Kaplan	Greg Walker & Jan Nash	May 15, 2008	3T6118	14.54
When five people with an odd connection all are abducted from a local coffee shop, the team learns about an old case that involved child molestation by a counselor at a summer camp. Meanwhile, Sam gives birth while the department opens an inquiry on Jack, talks to his staff and demotes him because they feel he is unfit to lead the department.
