= Pilot (Without a Trace) =

- Without a Trace episode
- Episode no.: Season 1 Episode 1
- Directed by: David Nutter
- Written by: Hank Steinberg
- Production code: 475182
- Original air date: September 26, 2002
- Running time: 41 minutes

Episode chronology
← Previous —	Next → "Birthday Boy"
- Without a Trace (season 1)

"Pilot" is the pilot episode, as well as the first episode of the first season, of the crime drama Without a Trace. The episode, that premiered in the United States on CBS on September 26, 2002, was written by series creator Hank Steinberg and directed by David Nutter.

In the pilot, the FBI investigates the disappearance of Maggie Cartwright, a successful advertising executive who was last seen arriving at 9:45 pm one evening. As they interview her friends and family, they learn that she was a role player who adapted her personality to the person she dealt with. When they discover that she had liquidated all of her assets and transferred them to London, they think they may be dealing with a runaway, but when her wealthy mother receives a ransom demand, they're not sure if Maggie has been kidnapped or if she's an extortionist.

According to the Nielsen Ratings, almost 16.2 million Americans viewed this episode.

== Plot ==
The missing persons team, complete with new recruit Martin, is dispatched to find missing Maggie Cartwright, a twenty-something marketing executive. At first, she appears to have everything, including a successful career and two loving divorced parents, but when the squad, led by Jack, digs deeper, agents discover that Maggie was desperately unhappy with several aspects of her life; not only did she have a checkered dating history, including a relationship with a married co-worker, but she was also involved with drugs. The team suspects that Maggie may have been suicidal, but changes its theory when an emailed ransom note, complete with proof of life, arrives at Maggie's mother's home. The kidnapper is demanding $1 million in return for Maggie's release, and the team must battle against time to save her. Martin makes a crucial mistake on his first day.

== Production ==
Without a Trace debuted as part of the CBS fall line-up in 2002, created by Hank Steinberg and produced by Jerry Bruckheimer.

The original title of the show was Vanished, but when CBS opted to pick it up the title was changed to Without a Trace.

== Reception ==
The pilot aired on CBS on September 26, 2002, during the 10 to 11 pm (ET) timeslot. The pilot episode was seen by 16.21 million viewers, with a total household rating/share of 8.9/15, and a 3.9/11 ratings/share among those aged 18 through 49. However, the 18 to 49 ratings for the pilot fell seven per cent against the series premiere of CSI: Miami, which achieved the biggest series debut of the 2002-03 television season.
