= Without a Trace =

American police procedural drama series (2002–2009)

- Genre: Police procedural; Crime drama
- Created by: Hank Steinberg
- Starring: Anthony LaPaglia; Poppy Montgomery; Marianne Jean-Baptiste; Enrique Murciano; Eric Close; Roselyn Sánchez
- Composers: Peter Manning Robinson; Richard Marvin; Reinhold Heil; Johnny Klimek
- Country of origin: United States
- Original language: English
- No. of seasons: 7
- No. of episodes: 160 (list of episodes)

Production
- Executive producers: Hank Steinberg; Jerry Bruckheimer; Jonathan Littman; Ed Redlich; Jan Nash; Greg Walker
- Producers: Greg Walker; Jan Nash; Gwendolyn M. Parker; Scott White; Diego Gutierrez; Nancy van Doornewaard; Allison Abner; David H. Goodman; Byron Balasco
- Production locations: New York City, New York, U.S.
- Running time: 43 minutes
- Production companies: Jerry Bruckheimer Television; CBS Paramount Network Television (Note: Credited as CBS Productions from seasons 1–4.); Warner Bros. Television

Original release
- Network: CBS
- Release: September 26, 2002 – May 19, 2009

Related
- CSI: Crime Scene Investigation; CSI: Miami; CSI: NY; CSI: Cyber; CSI: Vegas; Cold Case

Without a Trace is an American police procedural drama television series created by Hank Steinberg that aired on CBS from September 26, 2002, to May 19, 2009, with the total of seven seasons and 160 episodes. The series focuses the cases of a Missing Persons Unit (MPU) of the Federal Bureau of Investigation (FBI) in New York City. It starred Anthony LaPaglia, Poppy Montgomery, Marianne Jean-Baptiste, Enrique Murciano, Eric Close, and Roselyn Sánchez.

At the time of its original broadcast, Without a Trace was one of CBS' most successful series, earning high television ratings and winning a Primetime Emmy Award. On May 19, 2009, CBS announced the cancellation of the series after seven seasons.

== Premise ==
Each episode follows the search for one individual under tight time constraints. The stories also focus on the personal lives of the team members and illustrate how their experiences give them insight into cases. The team consists of Jack Malone (Anthony LaPaglia), Samantha Spade (Poppy Montgomery), Vivian Johnson (Marianne Jean-Baptiste), Danny Taylor (Enrique Murciano), Martin Fitzgerald (Eric Close), and Elena Delgado (Roselyn Sánchez), the last of whom joins the cast in the fourth season.

The real FBI does investigate missing persons; specifically, they have the authority to help in any "mysterious" disappearances of children abducted by nonfamily members. The groups that investigate these crimes are called Child Abduction Rapid Deployment teams. They get involved in other missing persons cases as needed but do not have a dedicated unit. One element that sets the series apart from other TV police dramas is the display of information about real-life missing persons at the end of most episodes. This resulted in a kidnapped brother and sister being found on July 25, 2005. At least five people have been found as a result of those announcements. Occasionally, such information is replaced with other public-service announcements, such as an episode about an attempted suicide that presents information on a suicide help line. Showings outside the United States tend to omit missing persons information; however, Australia's Nine Network usually showed Australian cases, and in Hong Kong, the TVB Pearl showed information about local missing persons during the first two seasons. Without a Trace takes place within Jerry Bruckheimer's CSI: Crime Scene Investigation universe. A crossover episode in 2007 features characters Gil Grissom (William Petersen) from CSI and Jack Malone from Without a Trace working together to solve the same case.

== Production ==
Without a Trace debuted as part of the CBS fall line-up in 2002, created by Hank Steinberg and produced by Jerry Bruckheimer. The show is the only primetime American drama to feature two Australians (LaPaglia and Montgomery) and a Briton (Jean-Baptiste) playing Americans in the regular cast. It was the first show to achieve strong ratings opposite longtime NBC hit medical drama ER which, like Without a Trace, is produced by Warner Bros. Television.

Without a Trace ran on Thursdays at 10 pm until September 2006, when it was moved to Sundays. In the 2007–2008 season, it swapped timeslots with Shark, returning it to its old timeslot on Thursdays. However, this lasted only until the 2008–2009 season, when it moved to Tuesdays at 10pm.

The first two showrunners were Steinberg and Ed Redlich. Between seasons two and three, Redlich moved away from active participation in the series, with staff writers Jan Nash and Greg Walker taking over. In the middle of season four, Steinberg left to produce the series The Nine, while remaining executive producer.

=== Cancellation ===
On May 19, 2009, the morning after the series finale aired, it was announced that the show had been cancelled. In season seven, the ratings sank lower, to an average of a 2.7 rating but climbed up to 12 million viewers and ranked 18th. However, CBS had to make a choice between renewing either Without a Trace or Cold Case due to budget cuts. They chose to keep Cold Case, but ultimately cancelled it at the end of the following season.

== Main cast ==
Character	Portrayed by	Occupation	Main cast
John "Jack" Michael Malone	Anthony LaPaglia	Supervisory Special Agent - Missing Persons Unit, FBI	Seasons 1–7
Samantha "Sam" Spade	Poppy Montgomery	Special Agent - Missing Persons Unit, FBI	Seasons 1–7
Vivian "Viv" Johnson	Marianne Jean-Baptiste	Special Agent - Missing Persons Unit, FBI	Seasons 1–7
Danny Taylor, né Alvarez	Enrique Murciano	Special Agent - Missing Persons Unit, FBI	Seasons 1–7
Elena Delgado	Roselyn Sánchez	Special Agent - Missing Persons Unit, FBI	Seasons 4–7
Martin Fitzgerald	Eric Close	Special Agent - Missing Persons Unit, FBI	Seasons 1–7

== Season synopsis ==
=== Season 1 ===
The missing persons unit is headed up by the driven but morally compromised Jack Malone, whose professional successes are marred by his complicated personal life—he is in the midst of a messy breakup from his wife, precipitated by his own infidelity with his protege, Samantha "Sam" Spade. At the outset of the series, Jack struggles to balance his crumbling marriage with the arrival of Martin Fitzgerald, a rookie agent whose placement Jack sees as a sinecure due to Fitzgerald's father being a powerful figure in the FBI. The team ultimately find themselves forced to come together and personally reckon with the legacy of 9/11 when a powerful businesswoman whose company headquarters were destroyed in the Twin Tower attacks goes missing and her kidnapper—a man whose wife was killed in the World Trade Center—abducts Jack in order to forestall her rescue.

=== Season 2 ===
As the team continues to track down missing people, Jack and his wife slide towards divorce, while Jack must also care for his father (Martin Landau) who has Alzheimer's disease. The team members' life histories are revealed, including the fact that Martin was practically raised by his aunt and uncle, and Danny is an orphan whose estranged brother Rafael (Alex Fernandez) is a convicted felon. Martin fatally shoots a child sex trafficker, and both Vivian and he must keep quiet to keep their jobs. Jack makes a last-ditch attempt to save his marriage by moving to Chicago with his family, giving Vivian a long-awaited promotion to his post, but at the last minute, his wife Maria (Talia Balsam) leaves without him, taking their daughters Hannah and Kate (Vanessa and Laura Marano) with her.

Following a campaign by the conservative group the Parents Television Council, CBS was fined a record $3.6 million for indecency for the sixth episode "Our Sons and Daughters", which centered around a teenaged orgy. CBS argued that the episode "featured an important and socially relevant storyline warning parents to exercise greater supervision of their teenaged children."

=== Season 3 ===
Vivian loses her promotion when Jack returns to his job, causing some commotion among the team. She also experiences heart trouble that endangers her life and her career and undergoes risky surgery. Martin and Samantha begin dating secretly, and because of disagreements between them on whether or not to reveal it to the rest of the team, it ends badly. Jack undergoes a brutal custody battle with his ex-wife. Danny has to confront his traumatic past, and Rafael. The season ends with a cliffhanger as a hired mercenary opens fire on Martin and Danny's car while they transport a prisoner.

=== Season 4 ===
After barely surviving the gun battle that ended season three, Martin must recover from near-fatal gunshot wounds while Danny battles post-traumatic stress disorder (PTSD). Stretched for help, the team gets a new member, Elena Delgado, a former NYPD vice-squad officer with an aggressive, streetwise attitude. She has a past connection to Danny, the nature of which is unknown until season five. Martin develops an addiction to painkillers, and Jack begins dating Anne Cassidy (Mary Elizabeth Mastrantonio), the widow of a former mentor killed in the line of duty.

=== Season 5 ===
Anne miscarries and abruptly breaks up with Jack. Danny and Elena begin dating, while her ex-husband Carlos Aguilar (Jsu Garcia) sues for custody of their daughter Sofie (Ashlyn Sanchez) and later abducts her. More about Samantha's difficult past is revealed, including her strained relationships with her mother Patricia (Tess Harper) and older sister Emily (Molly Price). Jack is abducted and tortured by a psychotic woman but initially appears to show few effects. At the end of the season, Carlos is freed, leaving the team worried about Elena's safety, and a serial kidnapper appears to be preying on young women.

=== Season 6 ===
Vivian is put in charge of a task force to locate the serial kidnapper, who is part of a sex-trafficking ring. Samantha discovers that she is pregnant from a one-night stand with a bartender at the time, Brian Donovan (Adam Kaufman), and by the end of the season, he waives paternal rights because of what Jack digs up on him and Sam confronting him about it, and she gives birth to her son Finn. Jack begins a pattern of roughing up suspects and intimidating people to make them talk, which appears to be related to PTSD. He also gets into a dangerous situation without backup and is nearly killed and becomes overly involved in the life of a teenager he saved from the sex traffickers. In the season finale, he is demoted and put in mandatory therapy with Dr. Clare Bryson (Linda Hunt).

This season also contained a two-part crossover episode with CSI: Crime Scene Investigation, as Jack and Gil Grissom (William Petersen) and their teams track down a serial killer responsible for the disappearance of a boy six years ago. Both episodes are included on the DVD collection for CSI's eighth season.

Without a Trace completed 12 episodes of season six before the 2007–2008 WGA strike. Because the show's writing staff all joined the strike, no more new episodes were made until the issue was settled. Once the strike ended, the show returned on April 3, 2008, with six episodes.

=== Season 7 ===
The seventh and final season begins with the team getting a new boss, Clark Medina (Steven Weber), but he shortly gives Jack his position back. Jack and Sam's relationship rekindles. Jack takes custody of his older daughter Hannah. Brian decides to be a father to Finn. Martin gets involved with Kim Marcus (Vanessa Marcil), but he eventually finds out that she was involved in a crime and arrests her. Jack and Sam mutually end their romantic relationship for good. Jack reconciles with Hannah. Sam begins living with Brian to raise Finn together. The team goes to Danny and Elena's wedding.

== Episodes ==
Season	Episodes	Originally released	
Season	Episodes	First released	Last released
1	23	September 26, 2002	May 15, 2003
2	24	September 25, 2003	May 20, 2004
3	23	September 23, 2004	May 19, 2005
4	24	September 29, 2005	May 18, 2006
5	24	September 24, 2006	May 10, 2007
6	18	September 27, 2007	May 15, 2008
7	24	September 23, 2008	May 19, 2009

=== Crossover with CSI: Crime Scene Investigation ===
In "Where and Why", Gil Grissom comes to New York to help the FBI track down a serial killer after Jack Malone comes to Las Vegas to help the CSIs with a murder victim in "Who and What".

== Reception ==
Without a Trace received generally positive reviews during its original broadcast. On Rotten Tomatoes, the series received a score of 81% based on 16 reviews. On Metacritic, the series earned a 75 out of 100 based on 30 critic reviews.

=== U.S. television ratings ===
Seasonal rankings (based on average total viewers per episode) of Without a Trace on CBS:

Note: Each U.S. network television season starts in late September and ends in late May, which coincides with the completion of May sweeps.

Season	Timeslot	Season premiere	Season finale	TV season	Ranking	Viewers (in millions)
1	Thursday 10:00 pm	September 26, 2002	May 15, 2003	2002–2003	#15	15.09
2	Thursday 10:00 pm	September 25, 2003	May 20, 2004	2003–2004	#11	16.74
3	Thursday 10:00 pm	September 23, 2004	May 19, 2005	2004–2005	#8	18.68
4	Thursday 10:00 pm	September 29, 2005	May 18, 2006	2005–2006	#7	18.7
5	Sunday 10:00 pm (1–23); Thursday 10:00 pm (24)	September 24, 2006	May 10, 2007	2006–2007	#16	14.7
6	Thursday 10:00 pm	September 27, 2007	May 15, 2008	2007–2008	#20	13.10
7	Tuesday 10:00 pm	September 23, 2008	May 19, 2009	2008–2009	#18	12.86

=== Awards and nominations ===
During the series' run, it received 1 Golden Globe award nomination, 5 Primetime Emmy award nomination, and 3 Screen Actors Guild award nominations.

Year	Association	Category	Nominee/Recipient	Results
2003	Primetime Emmy Award	Outstanding Guest Actor in a Drama Series	Charles S. Dutton	Won
2003	Creative Arts Emmy Award	Outstanding Art Direction for a Single Camera Series	Aaron Osborne	Won
2003	NAACP Image Awards	Outstanding Supporting Actress in a Drama Series	Marianne Jean-Baptise	Nominated
2003	Satellite Awards	Best Television Series - Drama		Nominated
2003	Young Artist Award	Best Performance in a TV Drama Series - Guest Starring Young Actor	David Henrie	Nominated
2004	Gold Derby Awards	Best Drama Series		Nominated
2004	Gold Derby Awards	Best Lead Actor	Anthony LaPaglia	Nominated
2004	Gold Derby Awards	Best Supporting Actress in a Series	Marianne Jean-Baptise	Nominated
2004	Gold Derby Awards	Best Guest Actor in a Drama Series	Martin Landau	Nominated
2004	Gold Derby Awards	Best Episode of the Year "Wannabe"	David Barrett	Nominated
2004	Golden Globe Award	Best Lead Actor in a Television Series - Drama	Anthony LaPaglia	Won
2004	Gracie Allen Awards	Outstanding Entertainment Program - Drama		Won
2004	Primetime Emmy Award	Outstanding Lead Actor in a Drama Series	Anthony LaPaglia	Nominated
2004	Primetime Emmy Award	Outstanding Guest Actor in a Drama Series	Martin Landau	Nominated
2004	Satellite Awards	Best Lead Actor in a Series - Drama	Anthony LaPaglia	Nominated
2004	Young Artist Award	Best Performance in a TV Series - Guest Starring Young Actress	Aria Noelle Curzon	Nominated
2005	Screen Actors Guild Award	Outstanding Performance by a Male Actor in a Drama Series	Anthony LaPaglia	Nominated
2005	Screen Actors Guild Award	Outstanding Performance by an Ensemble in a Drama Series	Eric Close Marianne Jean-Baptise Anthony LaPaglia Poppy Montgomery Enrique Murciano	Nominated
2005	Primetime Emmy Award	Outstanding Guest Actor in a Drama Series	Martin Landau	Nominated
2005	Satellite Awards	Best Lead Actor in a Series - Drama	Anthony LaPaglia	
2005	Screen Actors Guild Award	Outstanding Performance by a Male Actor in a Drama Series	Anthony LaPaglia	Nominated
2005	Young Artist Awards	Best Performance in a Television Series - Guest Starring Young Actor	Loren Berman	Nominated
2006	GLAAD Media Award	Outstanding Individual Episode "Transitions"		Nominated
2006	Gold Derby Awards	Best Supporting Actor	Martin Landau	Nominated
2006	Gold Derby Awards	Best Guest Actress in a Drama Series	Laurie Metcalf	Nominated
2006	NAACP Image Awards	Outstanding Actress in a Drama Series	Marianne Jean-Baptise	Nominated
2006	Young Artist Award	Best Performance in a Television Series - Guest Starring Young Actor	Masam Holden	Nominated
2006	Young Artist Award	Best Performance in a Television Series - Guest Starring Young Actress	Ashley Rose	Nominated
2007	ALMA Award	Outstanding Supporting Actress - TV Series, Miniseries or Television Movie	Roselyn Sanchez	Nominated
2007	NAACP Image Awards	Outstanding Actress in a Drama Series	Roselyn Sanchez	Nominated
2007	NAACP Image Awards	Outstanding Supporting Actress in a Drama Series	Marianne Jean-Baptise	Nominated
2007	Young Artist Award	Best Performance in a TV Series - Guest StarringYoung Actor	Darian Weiss	Won
2008	ALMA Award	Outstanding Actor in a Drama Series	Enrique Murciano	Nominated
2008	ALMA Awards	Outstanding Actress in a Drama Television Series	Roselyn Sanchez	Won
2008	ALMA Awards	Outstanding Writing for a Television Series	Jose Molina	Nominated
2008	NAACP Image Awards	Outstanding Supporting Actress in a Drama Series	Marianne Jean-Baptise	Nominated
2008	Young Artist Award	Best Performance in a TV Series - Guest Starring Young Actress	Ashley Sanchez	Nominated
2009	ALMA Awards	Actor in a Television - Drama	Enrique Murciano	Nominated
2009	ALMA Awards	Outstanding Actress in a Drama Series	Roselyn Sanchez	Nominated
2009	AACTA Awards	Best Actor	Anthony LaPaglia	Nominated
2009	Young Artist Award	Best Performance in a TV Series - Recurring Young Actress	Haley Ramm	Nominated

== Home media ==
=== Season releases ===
DVD name	Region 1	Region 2	Region 4
The Complete 1st Season	September 14, 2004	January 10, 2005	December 15, 2004
The Complete 2nd Season	March 13, 2007	January 16, 2006	November 16, 2005
The Complete 3rd Season	May 15, 2012	July 24, 2006	May 2, 2007
The Complete 4th Season	September 11, 2012	July 14, 2008	July 1, 2009
The Complete 5th Season	November 27, 2012	February 22, 2010	—N/a
The Complete 6th Season	May 7, 2013	July 5, 2010	—N/a
The Complete 7th and Final Season	April 29, 2014	—N/a	—N/a

Without a Trace Season 1 has been released on Region 1, Region 2 and Region 4 DVD. Season 2 (region 1 DVD) was released on March 13, 2007. Seasons 3 and 4 were released on Region 1 DVDs in 2012 under the Warner Archive "Manufactured On Demand" model. Season 5 was released in Region 1 on November 27, 2012. Season 6 was released in Regions 1 and 4 on May 7, 2013. Season 7 was released on April 29, 2014, on Region 1.

Seasons 1–6 have all been released under Region 2 encoding, while Seasons 1-4 have been released under Region 4 encoding.

== Syndication ==
From 2005 to 2009, after a long run of weekday back-to-back episodes on TNT, Without a Trace reruns were moved to a graveyard slot in early morning, then removed totally from TNT's lineup. From 2009 to 2014, the series aired on Ion Television. From 2010 to 2012, the series aired on MyNetworkTV.

In August 2020, Paramount Network began airing reruns of the show on August 14, 2020, making a return of the series in syndication for the first time since TNT removed it from its lineup in 2009.

In May 2023, Without a Trace was removed from the new Max streaming service that used to be HBO Max.

Since 2023, reruns of Without a Trace aired on Charge!.

== See also ==
- CSI: Crime Scene Investigation
- CSI: Miami
- CSI: NY
- Cold Case
- Criminal Minds
- Law & Order
- Law & Order: Criminal Intent
- Law & Order: Special Victims Unit
- Missing Persons
