= Martin Fitzgerald (Without a Trace) =

- Without a Trace character
- First appearance: "Pilot"
- Last appearance: "Undertow"
- Created by: Hank Steinberg
- Portrayed by: Eric Close

In-universe information
- Gender: Male
- Occupation: FBI agent
- Family: Victor Fitzgerald (father); Roger Toland (uncle); Bonnie Toland (aunt); Jamie Toland (cousin); Allison Toland (cousin)

Special Agent Martin Fitzgerald is a fictional character on the canceled CBS crime drama Without a Trace, portrayed by Eric Close. Martin is a member of the FBI missing persons case squad in New York City led by Special Agent Jack Malone.

== Biography ==
=== Season 1 ===
Originally with White Collar Crimes in Seattle, Martin's father, the Deputy Director of the FBI, had him transferred to New York City when the position became available. In the beginning, this transfer is seen by some on the team (particularly Danny Taylor) as favoritism on the part of the FBI brass. Martin's relationship with his father is a sticking point throughout most of the first season with the two as Danny believes that Martin is receiving what he describes as "free rein" around the office and the OPR as a result of his father; however, Martin does not have a great relationship with his father, especially after the latter attempted to interfere in one of Jack Malone's investigations and made it clear to Martin that Jack was not as great as he might think. The elder Fitzgerald also had the focus of an OPR investigation pulled away from Martin and placed onto Jack, leading Martin to angrily tell his father that he no longer needed his help and could manage his career on his own.

=== Season 2 ===
In the second season, Martin again came under the scrutiny of the OPR after he provoked a suspect in a case by punching him after learning that the man had cut the ear off a ten-year-old girl. The enraged man responded by pulling a knife and Martin was forced to shoot him. The incident is witnessed by a senior agent, Vivian Johnson. Both she and Martin had to keep quiet in order to preserve their careers; however, hours after they were both cleared of any wrongdoing by the OPR, Martin went to Jack and confessed what had been weighing on his conscience. Throughout the rest of the season, Martin experienced disturbing and vivid flashbacks to all of the shootings in which he had been involved. Later in the season, Martin's favorite aunt went missing, and he had to enlist the help of fellow agent Samantha Spade to find her when she goes missing not long after finding out her cancer is going to kill her soon.

=== Season 3 ===
Season three revolved around the inter-office romance between Martin and the agent he had been eyeing since he had first joined the team: Samantha Spade. Their relationship began after Jack announced he was moving to Chicago, leading Sam to ask Martin out. At Sam's request, they kept their relationship a secret, but it bothered Martin that Sam did not want to be seen with him, and he eventually broke up with her midway through the season. In the season finale, Martin and his partner Danny Taylor were transferring a prisoner to a detention center when they were ambushed. Danny survived with a scratch to the head and PTSD while bullet-riddled Martin endured hours of surgery and weeks of agonizing recovery, leading Danny to feel guilty and act carelessly. Only hours after Martin was shot, his controlling father, Victor Fitzgerald, showed up and took control over the rest of the investigation. He eventually realized near the end of the episode that his place was at his son's bedside in the hospital. Like Danny, Samantha also avoided Martin for a while after he was shot, but she eventually came to his bedside and explained to the unconscious Martin that while she has not always been there for him, she was not going to leave this time until he was better.

=== Season 4 ===
In the fourth season, Martin battled an addiction to prescription painkillers following his near-fatal shooting. He also dealt with the fear that he would not be able to do his job properly after he returned from the hospital, and this fear was intensified when Jack told him he had added a new agent to the team. Martin's addiction got worse, even bringing him to steal painkillers from a victim's home. It took the support and concern of Danny and Samantha to finally wake Martin up to the full extent of his situation and lead him to get help. Near the end of the season, Martin casually approached Danny in the office and thanked him for his support, explaining that he had found a sponsor (a retired NYPD officer) and that he was clean and working to stay that way.

=== Seasons 5 - 7 ===
From season 5, Martin has remained sober and committed to his work. However, in the seventh season, Martin starts dating a woman from a case where she was a witness and a threatened jury member. She pulls a gun on Martin when he goes to interview her. He later leaves it out of the report and he then gets involved with her. Martin then finds out that she is a criminal. He ends up giving her a minor gunshot wound, while arresting her.
