= Vivian Johnson (Without a Trace) =

Fictional character

- Without a Trace character
- First appearance: "Pilot"
- Last appearance: "Undertow"
- Created by: Hank Steinberg
- Portrayed by: Marianne Jean-Baptiste

In-universe information
- Gender: Female
- Occupation: FBI Special Agent
- Family: Alton Johnson (brother)
- Spouse: Marcus Johnson
- Children: Reggie Johnson

Special Agent Vivian "Viv" Johnson is a fictional character played by British actress Marianne Jean-Baptiste in the CBS TV drama Without a Trace. Vivian is second in command of the FBI missing persons case squad in New York City. The squad solves a new missing persons case every week.

Vivian Johnson has had conflict with her boss, Agent Jack Malone, because she lost out on a promotion after Jack decided against transferring to the Chicago field office and asked for his old job back. In the third season Vivian underwent open heart surgery. Vivian is married and is the mother of a teenage son named Reggie. At work, she is shown to have a good friendship with Jack. Vivian is Jack's right-hand agent and is seen giving him advice and comfort during hard times. Even though Jack often dismisses her caring nature she is always loyal and there for him. Vivian understands Jack the most of all the agents and often likes him, which leads to their bumping heads.

Vivian can speak French and has problems with her brother who works at the 43rd Precinct.
