= Poppy Montgomery =

Australian actress (born 1972)

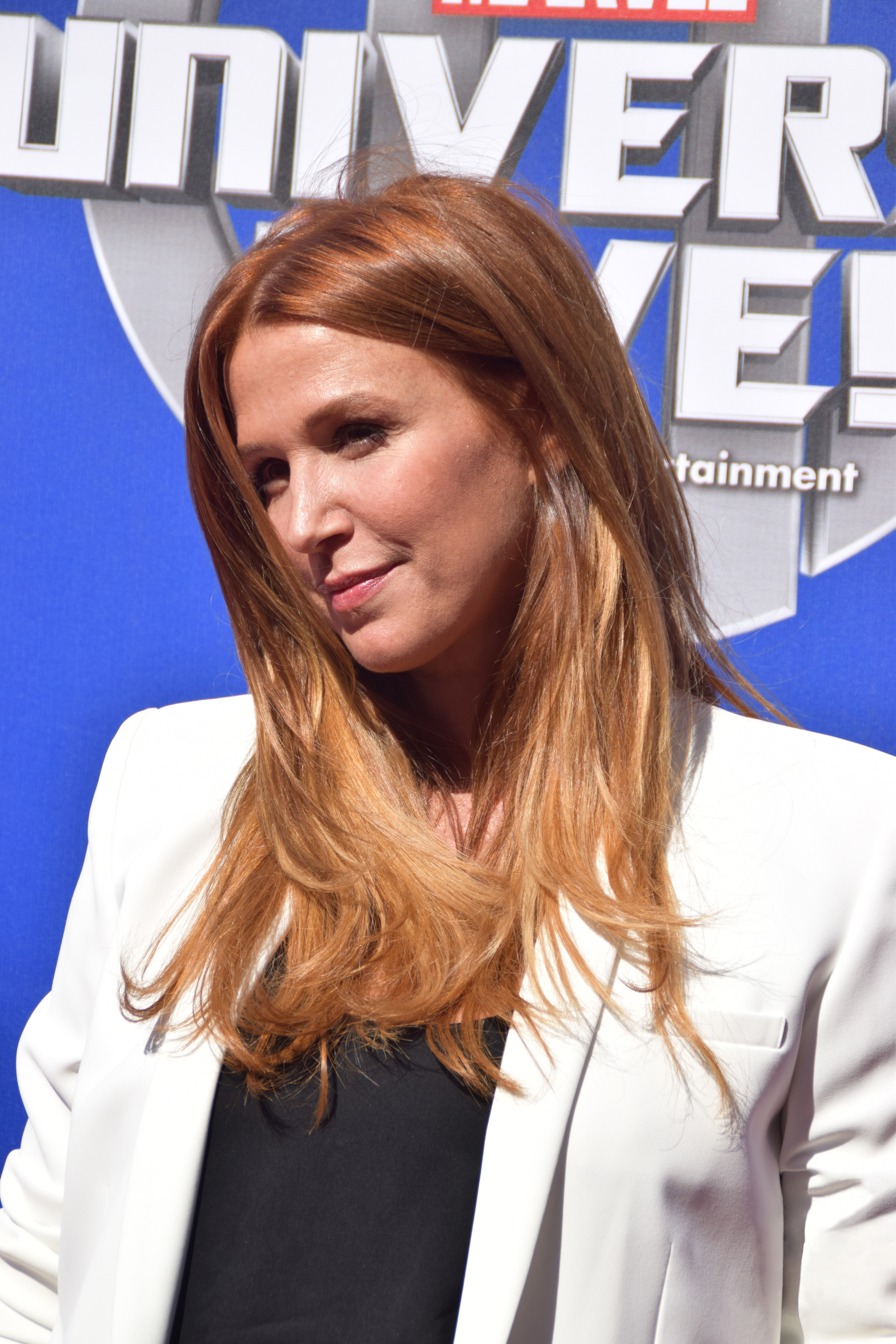
- Montgomery in May 2015
- Born: Poppy Petal Emma Elizabeth Deveraux Donahue; 19 June 1972 (age 54); Sydney, New South Wales, Australia
- Citizenship: Australia; United States
- Occupation: Actress
- Years active: 1994–2023
- Spouse: Shawn Sanford (m. 2014)
- Partner: Adam Kaufman (2005–2011)
- Children: 3

Poppy Montgomery (born Poppy Petal Emma Elizabeth Deveraux Donahue; 19 June 1972) is an Australian former actress. She played FBI agent Samantha Spade on the CBS mystery drama Without a Trace and Detective Carrie Wells on the CBS/A&E police drama Unforgettable. Her final role was in a 2023 unsold pilot, Judgement.

== Early life ==
Montgomery was born in Sydney, New South Wales, Australia, to mother Nicola (née Montgomery), an executive and market researcher, and father Phil Donahue, a restaurateur. She is one of six children. Her parents named all their daughters after flowers – Poppy, Rosie, Daisy, Lily and Marigold – and their son, Jethro Tull, after the rock band Jethro Tull.

Montgomery disliked school, being expelled from six private academies before finally dropping out at the age of 15 to pursue stage acting and to travel around Bali with her then-boyfriend. Montgomery emigrated to the United States at the age of 18, arriving in Florida to meet a boyfriend whom she had met when he was an exchange student. After five days, she realised that "[she] couldn't stand him" and took a bus to Los Angeles to pursue an acting career.

== Career ==
When Montgomery moved to Los Angeles, she stayed with two of her brother's friends, and sent a head shot every day to Julia Roberts' former manager, Bob McGowan, until he agreed to sign her. During the 1990s she appeared in several small television roles, including an appearance on NYPD Blue.

Montgomery's big break was portraying Marilyn Monroe in the 2001 CBS miniseries Blonde, based on a Joyce Carol Oates novel. The next role she was offered was a starring role as Samantha Spade on the CBS mystery drama Without a Trace. The series revolved around a missing persons unit of the FBI in New York City. On being offered the part, she later said, "They (the producers) called me up and said, 'Will you do it?' I said, 'Um' and they said, 'Anthony LaPaglia is in it' and I said, 'sure'. It was that simple." Montgomery portrayed Samantha Spade for seven seasons, from the show's first episode on 26 September 2002, until it ended on 19 May 2009.

In 2011, Montgomery portrayed Harry Potter author J. K. Rowling in the television biographical film Magic Beyond Words.

The same year, she began starring as Carrie Wells in the CBS police drama Unforgettable. Her character, a former homicide detective with hyperthymesia, uses her autobiopgraphical memory to solve crimes. After leaving Syracuse following the closure of the investigation into her sister's murder, Wells joins the NYPD in Queens after her ex-boyfriend Al Burns (portrayed by Dylan Walsh) begs her to help him.

The first season, with 22 episodes, ran from September 2011 until May 2012, and CBS initially cancelled the show on 12 May 2012. Unforgettable was later renewed for a second season, with 13 episodes running from July 2013 to May 2014, and a third season, with 13 episodes running from June 2014 to September 2014.

A more recent role was in the TV series Reef Break, filmed in 2019 filmed on the Gold Coast in Queensland, Australia.

Montgomery posed in a series of photographs on Maxim's website in their "Girls of Maxim" feature.

== Personal life ==
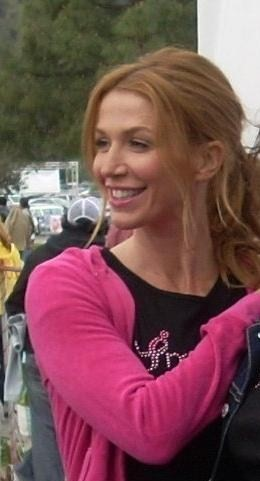
Montgomery in 2009

Montgomery met actor Adam Kaufman in 2005 in Mexico while working on the independent film Between, and in 2010, they worked together again in the TV film Lying to be Perfect. In 2007, Kaufman began a recurring role on Without a Trace in the season-five episode "At Rest" as Brian Donovan, Samantha's love interest for the rest of the series. In June 2007, Montgomery announced her pregnancy with Kaufman, which was written into season six. On 23 December 2007, she gave birth to their son Jackson Phillip. Montgomery's Without a Trace co-star Anthony LaPaglia became Jackson's godfather. On 10 October 2011 in Life & Style, Montgomery and Kaufman were reported to have separated.

In late 2011, Montgomery began dating Shawn Sanford, director of lifestyle marketing for Microsoft, whom she met in Puerto Rico. In April 2013, she gave birth to their daughter, Violet Grace. In November 2014, she gave birth to their son Gus Monroe. On the 4 April 2014 episode of Live! with Kelly and Michael, Montgomery revealed that on Chinese New Year, she and Sanford were married at Disneyland in a ceremony with their children present.

Montgomery holds both Australian and United States citizenship. She moved from Los Angeles to New York City in 2013 to continue filming Unforgettable.

== Filmography ==
=== Film ===
Year	Title	Role	Notes
1994	Tammy and the T-Rex	Party girl no. 1	
1995	Devil in a Blue Dress	Barbara's sister	
1998	Dead Man on Campus	Rachel	
1999	The Other Sister	Caroline Tate	
1999	Life	Older Mae Rose Abernathy	
2000	Men Named Milo, Women Named Greta	Barri Noodleman	Short film
2004	How to Lose Your Lover	Allison	
2005	Between	Nadine Roberts	

=== Television ===
Year	Title	Role	Notes
1994	Silk Stalkings	Angel	2-part episode: "Natural Selection"
1995	Jake Lassiter: Justice on the Bayou	Cindy	TV movie
1996	The Cold Equations	Marilyn 'Lee' Cross	TV movie
1996	Party of Five	Allison	Episode: "Poor Substitutes"
1996	NYPD Blue	Lisa	Episode: "Burnin' Love"
1996	Relativity	Jennifer Lukens	Recurring role
1997	Desert's Edge	Mary	TV short
1999	The Wonder Cabinet	Dr. Sarah Coleman	Unsold pilot
2000	The Beat	Elizabeth Waclawek	Recurring role
2001	Blonde	Norma Jean Baker / Marilyn Monroe	Miniseries, title character
2001	Going to California	Penelope	Episode: "Hurricane Al: A Tale of Key Largo"
2002	Glory Days	Ellie Sparks	Main cast
2002–2009	Without a Trace	Samantha Spade	Main cast
2004	Raising Waylon	Julia Bellows	TV special
2005	Murder in the Hamptons	Generosa Ammon	TV movie
2005	Snow Wonder	Paula	TV movie
2010	True Blue	Katherine Miller	TV pilot
2010	Lying to Be Perfect	Nola Devlin/Belinda Apple	TV movie
2011	Magic Beyond Words	J. K. Rowling	TV movie
2011–2016	Unforgettable	Carrie Wells	Main cast
2015	Signed, Sealed, Delivered from Paris, with Love	Holly O'Toole	TV movie
2017	A Surrogate's Nightmare	Angela	TV movie
2019	Reef Break	Cat Chambers	Main cast
2021	Christmas on the Farm	Clementine "Emmy" Jones	TV movie
2023	Judgement	Juliette	Unsold pilot
