= Samantha Spade =

- Without a Trace character
- First appearance: "Pilot"
- Last appearance: "Undertow"
- Created by: Hank Steinberg
- Portrayed by: Poppy Montgomery

In-universe information
- Gender: Female
- Occupation: FBI Special Agent
- Family: Patricia Spade (mother); Emily Reynolds (sister); Randy Spade (nephew)
- Spouse: Unknown man (ex-husband); Jack Malone (ex-boyfriend); Martin Fitzgerald (ex-boyfriend); Brian Donovan (boyfriend)
- Children: Finn Spade (son)

Samantha "Sam" Spade is a fictional character, an FBI Special Agent portrayed by actress Poppy Montgomery on the CBS television drama Without a Trace.

== History ==
Samantha is a Special Agent in the New York City FBI missing persons case squad led by Special Agent Jack Malone. She was raised in a poor, troubled home in the town of Kenosha, Wisconsin and as a result is particularly empathetic to kids in troubled situations. She was very unhappy as a teenager and tried to run away when she was sixteen, but was stopped by her mother and a policeman. She had a short-lived marriage when she was eighteen. She has had an on-again-off-again romantic relationship with Jack Malone, that began with an affair while he was married. She also had a secret office romantic relationship with Martin Fitzgerald, which ended because of disagreements between them on whether or not to reveal it to the rest of the team. She has a son, Finn, from a one-night-stand with Brian Donovan, who is played by Adam Kaufman, Montgomery's then-real-life boyfriend.

In Episode 18 of Season 5, Sam's estranged older sister, Emily (Molly Price), visited. When Samantha was fourteen, she killed her mother Patricia (Tess Harper)'s then-boyfriend (Joe Henry) with a shovel because she caught him sexually abusing Emily (Episode 19). They buried him in the woods next to the cabin and eventually grew distant from each other. Samantha learns that as a result of this abuse, Emily had a son, Randy, who now has cancer so she sought a bone marrow donor. Sam is not a match but her mother is a possibility.

Spade received her name because her mother was a fan of fictional detective Sam Spade from The Maltese Falcon, created by Dashiell Hammett.
