= Jack Malone (Without a Trace) =

- Without a Trace character
- First appearance: "Pilot"
- Last appearance: "Undertow"
- Created by: Hank Steinberg
- Portrayed by: Anthony LaPaglia

In-universe information
- Gender: Male
- Occupation: FBI Special Agent, U.S. Army Soldier (formerly)
- Family: Frank Malone (father, deceased); Doris Malone (mother, deceased)
- Spouse: Maria Malone (divorced)
- Children: Hannah Malone; Kate Malone; Unborn child (with Anne Cassidy)

Special Agent John "Jack" Michael Malone is a character in the CBS crime drama Without a Trace, portrayed by Anthony LaPaglia. He was the lead agent of the New York City FBI missing persons unit. His departmental title is Supervisory Special Agent of New York District Unit C-8. He appeared on a crossover episode of the CSI: Crime Scene Investigation "Who and What".

== Character biography ==
Growing up in Pittsburgh, Pennsylvania, Jack's mother died by suicide when he was 16. She attempted once before but Jack caught her and made her promise not to try again. She agreed but asked him not to tell his father. He has suffered intermittent guilt for not preventing her death and wishes he had told his father. At age 18, he enlisted in the U.S. Army (at his father's urging) and served for six years in the 82nd Airborne Division before returning to Pittsburgh, suffering from depression. Jack tried to commit suicide once at age 25 by driving his car into a telephone pole, but when asked about it, he claims that he fell asleep at the wheel. His wife, who knows the truth, later uses this information against Jack. Having taken a year off after leaving the service, Jack returned to college, where he received his bachelor's and his master's degree in psychology.

== Without a Trace ==
His marriage imploded after he had an affair with his subordinate, Agent Samantha Spade (Poppy Montgomery), and because of his long work hours. Although he later returned to his wife Maria, a lawyer, she left him at the end of the second season, moved to Chicago, and obtained full custody of their two daughters, Hannah and Kate (Vanessa Marano and Laura Marano). Jack's long work hours and troubled family history was used against him during the custody battle, though in the end he decided it would be better for them if they stayed with their mother. He still remains in close contact with the girls but struggles with his relationship with Hannah. Hannah resents him for the divorce and frequently refuses to speak to him. He is concerned about the future of his relationships with his daughters.

In the fourth season, Jack dealt with the death of his father (played by Martin Landau) from Alzheimer's disease and started a new relationship with Anne (Mary Elizabeth Mastrantonio), the widow of a fellow agent. Soon after they started dating, he learned that Anne was pregnant, which was an unpleasant surprise to both of them.

In the fifth season, Jack is dealing with the aftermath of a hostage standoff involving Anne and with her unexpected pregnancy and subsequent miscarriage. The miscarriage abruptly ends their relationship and Anne leaves the New York office. At the end of the season, he deals with a young girl, Jennifer Long, who goes missing after joining a cult, which causes the teenager to get caught up in a human trafficking ring.

In Season 6, Jack deals with numerous different cases while also focusing on human trafficking for a good part of the season. He's also informed that Sam is pregnant and tells her he didn't know she was seeing anyone. During the middle of the season, Jack is shot by the leader of the human trafficking ring Franklin Romar. He is left for dead, but the rest of his team finds Jack and Romar is arrested. Jack is left to recover in the hospital when he finds out that one of the victims, Jennifer Long, who he felt attached to is being targeted by one of Romar's men. Jack leaves the hospital to search for Jennifer and he finds her just in time before she is again abducted. In the season finale, Jack is demoted for his handling of the human trafficking investigation.

In the season seven premiere (Closure, 7x01), Jack has been replaced by Special Agent Clark Medina (played by Steven Weber). Jack was offered another job and considered taking it, but turned it down. A few episodes later, Clark gets Jack his job back before leaving for a better job. Over the last episodes of the 6th season and the first episodes of the seventh season Jack and Sam began to grow closer. In episode eight (Better Angels, 7x08), Jack and Sam headed to Los Angeles for a case, and rekindled their relationship. Also revealed in the episode is that Jack's daughter Hannah has been acting up and is going to live with Jack in New York for a while. In the series finale, Jack and Sam decide not to pursue their relationship for now as Jack needs to spend more time with Hannah and Sam needs to figure out things with Brian, the father of her child.

== Reception ==
As of 2004, Jack Malone was named one of the 10 best current characters by Zap2it.
