= Enrique Murciano =

American actor

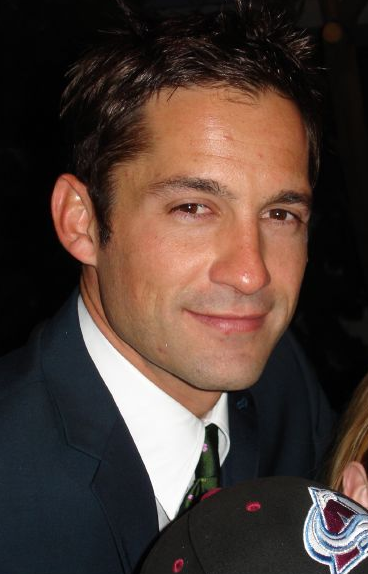
- Murciano in April 2006
- Born: Enrique Ricardo Murciano; July 9, 1973 (age 52); Miami, Florida, US
- Occupation: Actor
- Years active: 1997–present

Enrique Ricardo Murciano (born July 9, 1973) is an American actor. He is known for his role as FBI agent Danny Taylor in the CBS mystery drama series Without a Trace from 2002 to 2009.

== Early life and education ==
Born and raised in Miami, Florida, Murciano attended Christopher Columbus High School and then Tulane University in New Orleans, Louisiana. He originally studied at New England School of Law in Boston for a time, but ultimately decided to pursue an acting career and left. He moved to Los Angeles, and began his career, making his feature film debut in the 1997 action film Speed 2: Cruise Control, which starred Sandra Bullock.

== Career ==
In 2000, Murciano appeared in the crime drama Traffic. In 2001, he starred as Francesco Torres in the short-lived MTV soap opera Spyder Games. That same year, he appeared in war thriller Black Hawk Down. It was there that he met Jerry Bruckheimer, leading to him being offered a starring role as Danny Taylor in the CBS mystery drama Without a Trace. The series centered around a missing persons unit of the FBI in New York City. The show ran for seven seasons from September 26, 2002, to May 19, 2009. This role earned him two nominations from the ALMA Award in 2008 and in 2009.

His additional film credits include the comedy Miss Congeniality 2: Armed and Fabulous (his second film with Sandra Bullock), the drama How to Go Out on a Date in Queens, the drama The Lost City and the Peruvian-Spanish drama Máncora. He also appeared in the music video "Yes We Can" by will.i.am and in the video directed by Demi Moore "Presidential Pledge".

In October 2009, Murciano appeared in the CBS police procedural drama CSI: Crime Scene Investigation in season 10: episode 4 titled "Coup de Gráce" (French for "stroke of mercy"), as Det. Carlos Moreno from the LVPD Vice Division.

In April 2011, Murciano had a recurring role in the CBS police procedural drama NCIS, as CIA Agent Ray "CI-Ray" Cruz appearing in season 8: episode 20 titled "Two-Faced" and the eighth-season finale titled "Pyramid". In January 2012, he made his final appearance on the show in season 9: episode 13 titled "A Desperate Man".

In April 2012, Murciano returned to CSI: Crime Scene Investigation reprising his role of Det. Carlos Moreno, appearing in season 12: episode 20 titled "Altered Stakes", the twelfth-season finale titled "Homecoming", the thirteenth-season premiere titled "Karma to Burn" and season 13: episode 3 titled "Wild Flowers".

In October 2012, Murciano had a recurring role in the short-lived ABC supernatural/horror drama 666 Park Avenue, as Dr. Scott Evans, appearing in the fifth episode titled "A Crowd of Demons", the sixth episode titled "Diabolic" and the seventh episode titled "Downward Spiral".

Murciano co-starred as Kemp in the 3-D science fiction film Dawn of the Planet of the Apes, the 2014 sequel to Rise of the Planet of the Apes. From 2014 to 2016, he played Felipe Lobos in the Starz series Power.

In 2015, Murciano began a role as a series regular as Det. Marco Diaz on the Netflix original series Bloodline.

In 2017, Murciano had a supporting role in the Netflix original film Bright as a gang leader named "Poison".

== Personal life ==
In 2006, People magazine ranked him number seven in its annual list of "The Sexiest Men Alive".

== Filmography ==
=== Film ===
Year	Title	Role	Notes
1997	Speed 2: Cruise Control	Alejandro	Credited as Enrique Murciano Jr.
2000	Traffic	DEA agent	
2001	Black Hawk Down	Ruiz	
2002	Case 42	Lazlo	
2003	Cafe and Tobacco	Tico	
2005	Miss Congeniality 2: Armed and Fabulous	Jeff Foreman	
2005	The Lost City	Ricardo Fellove	
2008	Máncora	Iñigo	Also executive producer
2009	How to Go Out on a Date in Queens	Junior	
2013	Water & Power	Water	
2014	Dawn of the Planet of the Apes	Kemp	
2016	Collateral Beauty	Stan	Uncredited
2017	Rough Night	Detective Ruiz	
2017	Bright	Poison	
2020	The Half of It	Deacon Flores	
2022	Father of the Bride	Junior	
2023	Miranda's Victim	Detective Cooley	

=== Television ===
Year	Title	Role	Notes
1999	Suddenly Susan	Enrique	Episode: Wedding Bell Blues
1999	The Pretender	Tony	Episode: "Risque Business"
2001	Spyder Games	Francisco Torres	Main role; 36 episodes
2002	Star Trek: Enterprise	Tolaris	Episode: "Fusion"
2002–2009	Without a Trace	Danny Taylor	Main role; 159 episodes
2004	A Separate Peace		Television film; executive producer
2009, 2012	CSI: Crime Scene Investigation	Detective Carlos Moreno	5 episodes
2010	Marry Me	Harry	Miniseries; 2 episodes
2011	Medium	Luis Amenabar	Episode: "Me Without You"
2011–2012	NCIS	CIA Agent Ray Cruz	3 episodes
2012	666 Park Avenue	Dr. Scott Evans	3 episodes
2014–2016	Power	Felipe Lobos	10 episodes
2015–2017	Bloodline	Detective Marco Diaz	Main role; 26 episodes
2016–2017	Hap and Leonard	Raoul	6 episodes
2017	The Blacklist	Special Agent Julian Gale	5 episodes
2017	The Saint	Inspector John Henry Fernack	Television film
2020	Briarpatch	Senator Joseph Ramirez	5 episodes
2021	Tell Me Your Secrets	Peter Guillory	Main role
2021	Panic	Sheriff James Cortez	Main role
2023	The Night Agent	Ben Almora	10 episodes
2024	Monsters: The Lyle and Erik Menendez Story	Carlos Baralt	3 episodes
