= Hank Steinberg =

American screenwriter

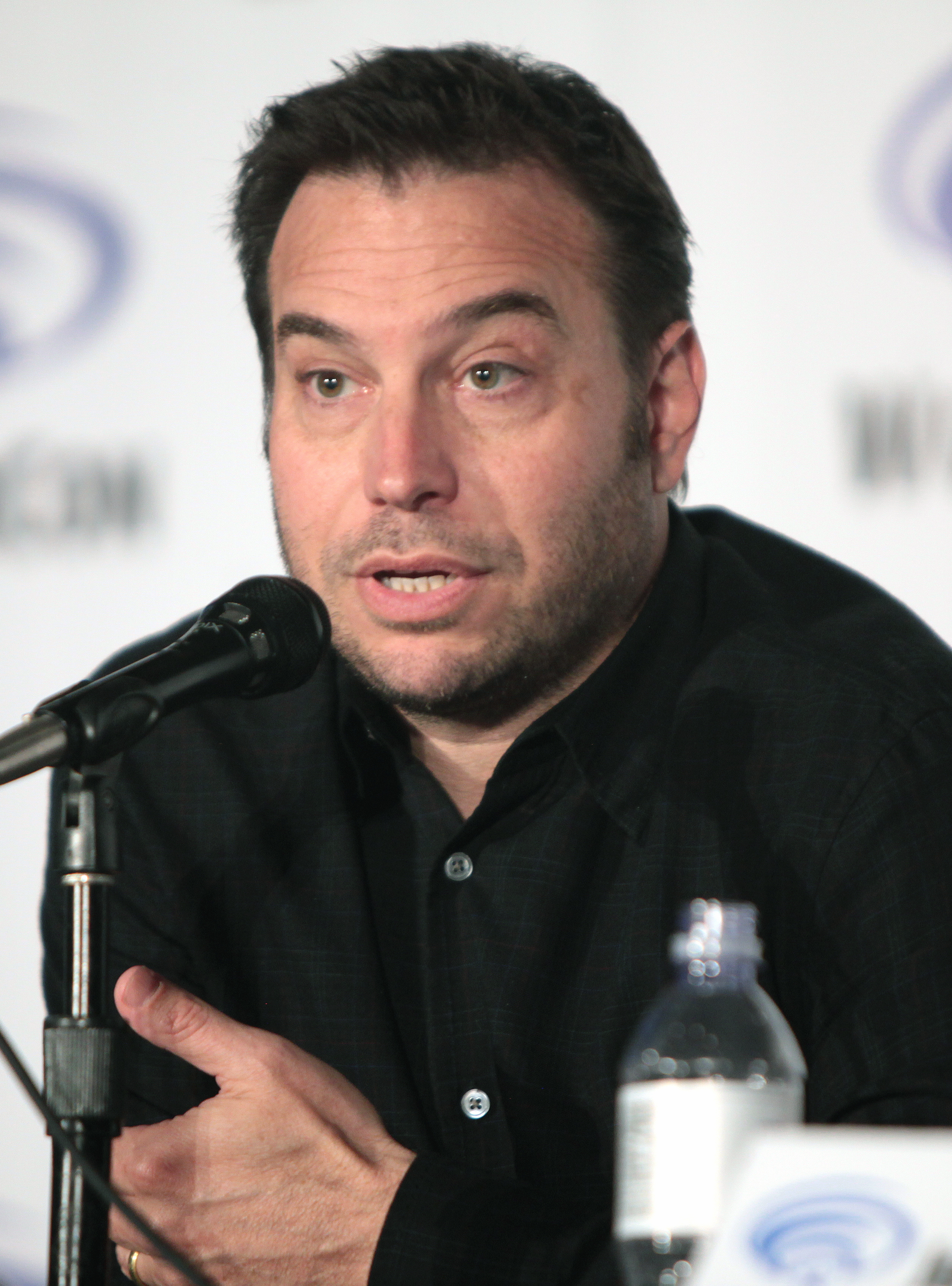
- Hank Steinberg in 2016.
- Born: November 19, 1969 (age 56); Manhasset, New York
- Occupations: Director, producer and writer
- Years active: 1996–present
- Spouse: Kara Dors (m. 2007)

Hank Steinberg (born November 19, 1969) is an American television and film writer, producer and director.

== Personal life ==
Hank Steinberg was born in Manhasset, New York, and raised in nearby Great Neck, both on Long Island. The son of Judy Hiller and attorney Howard E. Steinberg, former chairman of the New York State Thruway Authority and the Long Island Power Authority, he attended Great Neck North High School, graduating in 1987. He went on to the University of Pennsylvania, where he and was a sportswriter for the student-run newspaper The Daily Pennsylvanian and graduated in 1991 with a degree in English literature. Hank Steinberg is Jewish.

== Career ==
In 1997, Steinberg successfully sold the cable network HBO on 61*, a biographical drama about the legendary home-run race between Roger Maris and Mickey Mantle of the 1961 Yankees. A lifetime Yankees fan, Steinberg got the idea for the film while strolling through Monument Park at the old Yankee Stadium. The following year, Billy Crystal came aboard as a producer on the project and subsequently directed the film, starring Thomas Jane and Barry Pepper. 61* garnered 12 Emmy nominations, including Best Motion Picture for Television and Best Writing. Steinberg was also nominated for a WGA Award for the film.

Steinberg next wrote the Robert F. Kennedy biographical drama RFK for the cable network FX. Premiering August 25, 2002, it detailed Kennedy's life following the assassination of his brother, President John F. Kennedy, in 1963.

Steinberg then created the CBS show Without a Trace, which aired from September 26, 2002, to May 19, 2009. Without a Trace follows the cases of a missing persons unit of the FBI in New York City. During his tenure as executive producer and show-runner, the show won several Emmy awards and a Golden Globe for lead actor Anthony LaPaglia, as well as earning a SAG and Humanitas nomination. Steinberg was executive producer and show-runner of Without a Trace for the first three-and-a-half seasons.

Afterward, Steinberg created and was executive producer of the ABC series The Nine, which he wrote with his sister, KJ Steinberg. It ran seven episodes.

In 2010, HarperCollins purchased the rights to Steinberg's forthcoming novel, Out of Range, making a two-book deal for a potential franchise for the publisher. The book rights were subsequently sold to Paramount Pictures, where Steinberg adapted the book into a screenplay.

In May 2016, Hulu ordered a prehistoric-drama pilot, Dawn, from Steinberg and Ken Nolan. Dawn follows a tribe of Neanderthals as they struggle to survive and hold on to their way of life after coming into contact with a family of Homo sapiens.

Steinberg co-created and was executive producer of TNT's The Last Ship, in 2014, which ran for five seasons and 56 episodes through 2018. The series, starring Eric Dane, Rhona Mitra, Adam Baldwin, Charles Parnell, Travis Van Winkle, Marissa Neitling, Jocko Sims, Kevin Michael Martin, and Christina Elmore, follows a naval destroyer crew, after a pandemic kills most of Earth's population.

Steinberg went on to create and serve as an executive producer of the ABC American legal drama For Life, which premiered February 11, 2020. The series is a fictional legal and family drama inspired by the life of convict turned attorney Isaac Wright Jr. The success of the show led his Channel Road Productions company to an overall deal with Sony Pictures Television.

Sony Pictures Television acquired the international rights to the Italian drama Doc – Nelle tue mani in 2020 and later approached Steinberg about developing an American adaptation. In 2021 Steinberg brought on Barbie Kligman to help develop and serve as show-runner for the show's first season. Steinberg and Kligman sold the rights to Fox in 2023, and cast Molly Parker in the titular role. Following a massively successful first season, Fox announced it had renewed Doc for a 22 episode second season in February 2025, with Hank Steinberg continuing to co-showrun with Barbie Kligman. The high ratings and critical acclaim continued in Docs sophomore season, and season one reached the Netflix Top Ten upon its debut on the streamer. On March 9th, 2026 Fox announced the show will return for a third season in Fall 2026.
