= List of horror films of 1989 =

A list of horror films released in 1989.

Title	Director(s)	Cast	Country	Notes	Ref.
976-EVIL	Robert Englund	Stephen Geoffreys, Jim Metzler, Patrick O'Bryan	United States		
3615 code Père Noël	René Manzor	Alain Lalanne, Louis Ducreux, Brigitte Fossey	France		
After Midnight	Jim Wheat, Ken Wheat	Jillian McWhirter, Pamela Segall, Nadine Van Der Velde	United States		
Amityville 4: The Evil Escapes	Sandor Stern	Patty Duke, Robert Alan Browne	United States	Television film	
Beasties	Steven Paul Contreras	Denise Mora, Hector Yanez, Brenda Stubbe	United States		
Begotten	E. Elias Merhige	Brian Salzburg, Donna Dempsey	United States		
Beyond Dream's Door	Jay Woelfel	Nick Baldasare, Rick Kesler, Susan Pinsky	United States		
Beyond the Door III	Jeff Kwitny	Mary Kohnert, Bo Svenson, Victoria Zinny	Italy	Alternative title(s): Amok Train; Death Train	
Beware! Children at Play	Mik Cribben	Robin Lilly, Lori Tirgrath, Jamie Krause	United States		
Black Past	Olaf Ittenbach	Andrea Arbter, Andre Stryi, Sonja Berg	West Germany		
The Carpenter	David Wellington	Wings Hauser	Canada		
Celia	Ann Turner	Rebecca Smart	Australia		
The Cellar	Kevin S. Tenney	Patrick Kilpatrick	United States		
The Chill Factor (a.k.a. Demon Possessed)	David Irving	Brian Robbins, Bill Calvert	United States	Released on VHS in 1993	
Chopper Chicks in Zombietown	Christopher Webster	Dawn Laurie, Aaron Kjenaas, Connie Snyder	United States		
C.H.U.D. II: Bud the C.H.U.D.	David Irving	Brian Robbins, Bill Calvert	United States	Sequel to C.H.U.D. (1984)	
The Church	Michele Soavi	Hugh Quarshie, Asia Argento, Tomas Arana	Italy		
Clownhouse	Victor Salva	Nathan Forrest Winters, Brian McHugh, Sam Rockwell	United States		
Curse II: The Bite	Frederico Prosperi	Jill Schoelen, J. Eddie Peck	United States; Japan; Italy		
Cutting Class	Rospo Pallenberg	Donovan Leitch, Jill Schoelen, Brad Pitt	United States		
Dark Tower	Freddie Francis, Ken Wiederhorn	Michael Moriarty, Jenny Agutter, Theodore Bikel	United States		
The Dead Next Door	J. R. Bookwalter	Scott Spiegel, Maria Markovic, Bogdan Pecic	United States		
Dear Diary	Lupita Aquino-Kashiwahara, Leroy Salvador	Herbert Bautista, Gelli de Belen	Philippines		
The Death King	Jörg Buttgereit	Bela B., Susanne Betz, Hille Saul	West Germany		
Deceit	Albert Pyun	Norbert Weisser, Diane Defoe, Christian Andrews	United States		
Don't Panic	Rubén Galindo Jr.	Jon Michael Bischof, Gabriela Hassel, Helena Rojo	Mexico; United States		
Dr. Caligari	Stephen Sayadian	Madeleine Reynal, Fox Harris	United States		
Edge of Sanity	Gerard Kikoine	Anthony Perkins, Glynis Barber, Sarah Maur-Thorp	United Kingdom; United States		
Elves	Jeffrey Mandel	Dan Haggerty, Deanna Lund, Ken Carpenter	United States		
Family Reunion	Michael Hawes	A.J. Woods, John Andes, Pam Phillips	United States		
Flesh Eating Mothers	James Aviles Martin	Ramiro Oliveros, Donatella Hecht, Neal Rosen	United States		
The Fly II	Chris Walas	Eric Stoltz, Daphne Zuniga, John Getz	United States	Sequel to The Fly (1986)	
Freakshow	Constantino Magnatta	Timm Zemanek, Dean Richards Wiancko, Audrey Landers	Canada		
Friday the 13th Part VIII: Jason Takes Manhattan	Rob Hedden	Jensen Daggett, Scott Reeves, Mark Richman	United States		
From the Dead of Night	Paul Wendkos	Lindsay Wagner, Bruce Boxleitner	United States	Television film	
Grave Robbers	Rubén Galindo Jr.	Fernando Almada, Edna Bolkan, Erika Buenfil, Ernesto Laguardia, María Rebeca	Mexico		
Halloween 5: The Revenge of Michael Myers	Dominique Othenin-Girard	Donald Pleasence, Danielle Harris, Ellie Cornell	United States	Fifth film of Halloween franchise	
Hanging Heart	Jimmy Lee	Barry Wyatt, John Stevens	United States		
Headhunter	Francis Schaeffer	Wayne Crawford, Kay Lenz, Steve Kanaly	United States; South Africa		
Hellgate	William A. Levey	Ron Palillo, Abigail Wolcott	United States		
High Desert Kill	Harry Falk	Anthony Geary, Marc Singer, Micah Grant	United States	Television film	
The Horror Show	James Isaac	Lance Henriksen, Brion James, Rita Taggart	United States		
The House of Clocks	Lucio Fulci	Carla Cassola, Al Cliver	Italy		
Howling V: The Rebirth	Neal Sundstrom	Philip Davis, Victoria Catlin, Elizabeth She	United States		
I, Madman	Tibor Takács	Jenny Wright, Clayton Rohner	United States		
Intruder	Scott Spiegel	Elizabeth Cox, Renée Estevez, Dan Hicks	United States		
Killer Crocodile	Fabrizio De Angelis	Sherrie Rose, Van Johnson, Ann Douglas	Italy		
Las Vegas Bloodbath	David Schwartz	Ari Levin, Rebecca Gandara, Jerry Raganesi	United States		
Laurin	Robert Sigl	Dóra Szinetár, Brigitte Karner, Károly Eperjes	West Germany; Hungary		
Leviathan	George Pan Cosmatos	Peter Weller, Richard Crenna, Amanda Pays	United States; Italy		
Lobster Man from Mars	Stanley Sheff	Diana Frank, Ava Fabian, Deborah Foreman	United States		
Mangetsu no Kuchizuke	Ryū Kaneda	Eri Fukatsu, Yasufumi Terawaki, Akiko Matsumura	Japan		
Masque of the Red Death	Larry Brand, Jeffrey Delman	Patrick Macnee, Adrian Paul	United States	Produced by Roger Corman	
Masque of the Red Death	Alan Birkinshaw	Frank Stallone, Brenda Vaccaro, Herbert Lom	United States	Produced by Harry Alan Towers	
Maya	Marcello Avallone	Peter Phelps, Mariella Valentini, William Berger	Italy		
Metamorphosis: The Alien Factor	Glenn Takajian	Diana Flaherty, Marcus Powell, Tara Leigh	United States		
Monster High	Rudy Poe	Diana Frank, Robert Lind, Doug Kerzner	United States		
Murder Weapon	David DeCoteau	Karen Russell, Allen First, Linnea Quigley	United States		
Mutator	John R. Bowey	Brion James, Carolyn Ann Clark, Milton Raphael Murill	United States		
Night Life	David Acomba	Scott Grimes, John Astin, Cheryl Pollak	United States		
Night Visitor	Rupert Hitzig	Elliott Gould, Richard Roundtree, Michael J. Pollard	United States		
A Nightmare on Elm Street 5: The Dream Child	Stephen Hopkins	Robert Englund, Lisa Wilcox, Kelly Minter	United States	Fifth film of A Nightmare on Elm Street franchise	
Offerings	Christopher Reynolds	Loretta Leigh Bowman, Elizabeth Greene, G. Michael Smith	United States		
Paganini Horror	Luigi Cozzi	Daria Nicolodi, Jasmine Maimone, Pascal Persiano	Italy		
Parents	Bob Balaban	Randy Quaid, Mary Beth Hurt	United States		
Pet Sematary	Mary Lambert	Dale Midkiff, Fred Gwynne, Denise Crosby	United States		
Phantom of the Mall: Eric's Revenge	Richard S. Friedman	Morgan Fairchild, Derek Rydall, Jonathan Goldsmith	United States		
Psycho Cop	Wallace Potts		United States		
Puppet Master	David Schmoeller	Paul Le Mat, Irene Miracle, Matt Roe	United States		
The Red Monks	Gianni Martucci	Gerardo Merrato, Daniela Barnes, Malisa Longo	Italy		
Shocker	Wes Craven	Peter Berg, Michael Murphy, Mitch Pileggi	United States		
Silent Night, Deadly Night 3: Better Watch Out!	Monte Hellman	Bill Moseley, Laura Harring, Richard Beymer	United States	Third film of Silent Night, Deadly Night film series	
Skinned Alive	Jon Killough	J. R. Bookwalter, Lester Clark	United States		
Sleepaway Camp III: Teenage Wasteland	Michael A. Simpson	Pamela Springsteen, Tracy Griffith, Michael J. Pollard	United States		
Society	Brian Yuzna	Billy Warlock, Devin DeVasquez, Heidi Kozak	United States		
Speak of the Devil	Raphael Nussbaum	Dan Patrick Brady, David Campbell, William Cannon	United States		
Spontaneous Combustion	Tobe Hooper	Jaime Alba, Cynthia Bain	United States		
Stepfather II	Jeff Burr	Terry O'Quinn, Meg Foster, Caroline Williams	United States		
Stuff Stephanie in the Incinerator	Don Nardo	Catherine Dee, William Dame, M.R. Murphy	United States		
Sundown: The Vampire in Retreat	Anthony Hickox	David Carradine, Bruce Campbell	United States		
Tetsuo: The Iron Man	Shinya Tsukamoto	Tomorowo Taguchi, Kei Fujiwara, Shinya Tsukamoto	Japan		
Things	Andrew Jordan	Robert (Tex) Allen, Amber Lynn, Patricia Sadler	United States		
The Toxic Avenger Part II	Lloyd Kaufman, Michael Herz	Ron Fazio, John Altamura, Phoebe Legere	United States		
Vampire's Kiss	Robert Bierman	Nicolas Cage, Jennifer Beals, Elizabeth Ashley	United States	Comedy horror	
The Vineyard	James Hong, William "Bill" Rice	Cheyl Madsen, Karen Witter, Michael Wong	United States; Canada		
Violent Shit	Andreas Schnaas	Karl Inger, Gabi Banner, Wolfgang Hinz	West Germany		
Warlock	Steve Miner	Julian Sands, Lori Singer, Richard E. Grant	United States		
Witch Story	Alessandro Capone	Amy Adams, Jeff Bankert, Ian Bannen	Italy		
The Woman in Black	Herbert Wise	Adrian Rawlins, Bernard Hepton, David Daker	United Kingdom	Television film	
Zombie Rampage	Todd Sheets	Dave Byerly, Erin Kehr, Stanna Bippus	United States	Led to sequel Zombie Bloodbath (1993)	

== Sources ==
- Albright, Brian (2012). Regional Horror Films, 1958-1990: A State-by-State Guide with Interviews. Jefferson, North Carolina: McFarland. ISBN 978-1-476-60042-0.
- Clark, Randall (1995). At a Theater or Drive-In Near You: The History, Culture and Politics of the American Exploitation Film. New York City, New York: Garland. ISBN 978-0-815-31951-1.
- Curti, Roberto (2019). Italian Gothic Horror Films, 1980-1989. Jefferson, North Carolina: McFarland. ISBN 978-1-4766-7243-4.
- Dendle, Peter (2010). The Zombie Movie Encyclopedia. Jefferson, North Carolina: McFarland. ISBN 978-0-7864-9288-6.
- Hardy, Phil, ed. (1995). The Overlook Film Encyclopedia. Vol. 3. Overlook Press. ISBN 0-87951-624-0.
- Lentz, Harris M. (1994). Science Fiction, Horror & Fantasy Film and Television Credits, Supplement 2: Through 1993. Jefferson, North Carolina: McFarland. ISBN 978-0-899-50927-3.
- Muir, John Kenneth (2010). Horror Films of the 1980s. Jefferson, North Carolina: McFarland. ISBN 978-0-786-45501-0.
- Shelley, Peter (2012). Australian Horror Films, 1973-2010. Jefferson, North Carolina: McFarland. ISBN 978-0-786-46167-7.
- Stanley, John (2000). Creature Features: The Science Fiction, Fantasy, and Horror Movie Guide. New York: Berkley Boulevard Books. ISBN 978-0-425-17517-0.
- Weldon, Michael (1996). The Psychotronic Video Guide To Film. New York City, New York: Macmillan. ISBN 978-0-312-13149-4.
- Young, R. G. (2000). The Encyclopedia of Fantastic Film: Ali Baba to Zombies. Hal Leonard Corporation. ISBN 1-55783-269-2.
