= Beyond Dream's Door =

- VHS artwork
- Directed by: Jay Woelfel
- Written by: Jay Woelfel
- Produced by: Dyrk Ashton
- Starring: Nick Baldasare; Rick Kesler; Susan Pinsky; Norm Singer
- Cinematography: Scott Spears
- Edited by: Randy Spears; Susan Resatka
- Music by: Jay Woelfel
- Production company: Panorama Entertainment
- Distributed by: VidAmerica
- Release date: 7 April 1989
- Running time: 86 minutes (original edit); 80 minutes (director's cut)
- Country: United States
- Language: English
- Budget: $40,000

Beyond Dream's Door is a 1989 American supernatural horror film written, directed, and scored by Jay Woelfel (in his feature film debut), and starring Nick Baldasare, Rick Kesler, Susan Pinsky, and Norm Singer. The plot follows a college student who desperately tries to unravel the meanings behind his horrific nightmares as they begin to intrude upon reality and endanger those around him. Since its release, the film has garnered a cult following.

== Plot ==
In 1988, Benjamin "Ben" Dobbs is an American college student who has been experiencing a series of increasingly surreal and disturbing nightmares. These dreams consistently feature a number of recurring images and figures: a red balloon, a crazed janitor with hook hands, a non-existent younger brother named Ricky, a sensuous woman who routinely exposes her breasts, and most prominently, a large, fleshy, red monster that resembles a cross between a demon and a werewolf.

Seeking answers, Ben gives a leaflet describing his most recent dream to his psychology teacher, Professor Noxx, and asks him to read it. He then attends a session with Noxx's assistant, Julie Oxel, who has been running a dream research experiment. She gives Ben a sleeping pill and records him dreaming as part of the study.

That night, Ben receives a phone call from Noxx, asking him to come to his home to discuss the dreams. Noxx reveals that Ben's experiences resemble those of a case from 20 years earlier involving D.F. White—an otherwise ordinary young man who began having vivid, violent nightmares before falling into a coma and dying. Noxx and Ben visit the college library to research the case, where Ben sees a vision of White's ghost. The ghost warns Ben that “it” will take everyone he turns to for help and "hide them" within his dreams. Moments later, Ben witnesses Noxx being brutally murdered by the monster from his nightmares and flees in terror.

The next day, Ben returns to the library and retrieves the same book he and Noxx had been reading. However, the pages detailing White's case have mysteriously vanished, as though they never existed. Ben then approaches Eric Baxter, Noxx's other assistant, and describes a recurring dream location with large, concrete trapdoors. Eric recognizes the place as an old, unused room in the college and takes Ben there. Ben speculates that the monster may have come from beneath the trapdoors.

Later, Eric receives a call from Julie, who informs him that Noxx's phone number has been disconnected and his name has been erased from the college register. Meanwhile, Ben discovers that Noxx's entire house has inexplicably disappeared.

That night, after reviewing the tampered recording of Ben's dream, Eric and Julie head to their respective homes. Eric examines a pair of animal-like teeth he had found earlier in the trapdoor room. While reading a transcript of one of Ben's dreams, Eric and Ben simultaneously have a vision of Julie in danger. They rush to her house, only to find she has been decapitated.

Unable to return to his own home, Ben takes refuge with Eric. But when they arrive, they find Eric's house in disarray—Ben's leaflet shredded and the strange teeth missing. Ben concludes that the monster is trying to eliminate all evidence of its existence and will now target both him and Eric.

Having recovered one of the missing pages about White's case earlier, Ben devises a plan: he will use the page to lure the monster back beneath the trapdoors, believing this will banish it from reality. That night, he and Eric break into the college and set up a crane mechanism to hold the trapdoors open. During the process, Eric is killed by the monster. In a final effort, Ben uses the page to bait the creature into the pit beneath the trapdoors and then releases the mechanism, slamming them shut -— his fate left unknown.

== Cast ==
- Nick Baldasare as Benjamin Dobbs
- Rick Kesler as Eric Baxter
- Susan Pinsky as Julie Oxel
- Norm Singer as Professor Noxx
- Daniel White as D.F. White
- John Dunleavy as The Janitor
- Darby Vasbinder as Dream Seductress
- Marge Whitney as Mrs. Oxel
- Lucas Simpson as Ricky

== Production ==
=== Short film ===
Beyond Dream's Door originated as a 21-minute shot-on-video short film created by Jay Woelfel in 1983 while he was a student in Ohio State University’s now-defunct Cinema Department. Woelfel drew inspiration from H. P. Lovecraft’s The Shadow Out of Time, but chose not to adapt it directly, believing it was not yet in the public domain. An ex-girlfriend's father once remarked to Woelfel that he didn't dream, which was a catalyst for the concept.

The script was developed around the trapdoor room, which was being used as a storage space on the second floor of the now-demolished Haskett Hall at Ohio State University. The trapdoors were not hinged and had originally been used for structural engineering tests. The style and tone was intentionally artistic to appeal to Woelfel's instructor. After being exposed to "video poetry pieces" in class that used pre-existing poems, Woelfel decided to include a poem written specifically for the film, reasoning that the dream "wouldn't speak like you and me," but rather through poetry.

The role of Ben Dobbs was played by Rick Kesler, whom Woelfel had met while working as a crew member on another film. Kesler, in turn, recruited Nick Baldasare—his co-star in a regional stage production of Deathtrap—to play the role of Eric Baxter. The short was entered into a contest at California State University, Fullerton, where it won first place.

=== Development and Pre-Production ===
Woelfel graduated in 1985, and was seeking a way to break into show business. His friend Scott Spears encouraged him to expand the Beyond Dream's Door script into a feature film. Around that time, A Nightmare on Elm Street had just been released to tremendous success, and the franchise would continue to grow in popularity, proving the commercial viability of horror films centered around dreams. The first draft of the script was written in two weeks, and introduced two characters: Julie, who had originally been conceived for the short but was cut before filming, and Professor Noxx, a newly created role. The second draft included additional material to expand the runtime, notably a scene in which Ben speaks with his future self.

He met with a prospective producer who expressed interest in the project, and shortly afterward, Woelfel was invited to attend the Cannes Film Festival, where he screened his short film Distance Between Two Points, which also starred Baldasare. While at Cannes, he connected with exploitation filmmakers Lloyd Kaufman and Stephen C. Apostolof, who expressed interest in distributing the feature.

Upon returning home, both the original investor and a second prospective backer withdrew their support. In response, Woelfel began experimenting to see how cheaply he could produce a film on his own, directing three shorts on film: two adaptations of Nathaniel Hawthorne stories, the Emmy-winning The Birthmark and Come to Me Softly, as well as Guy de Maupassant’s Lui ? (retitled HE!). In the summer of 1987, he served as director of photography on the feature-length film Road Meat, which ultimately went unreleased, but reinforced his belief that a full-length production could be mounted independently in Ohio, using many of the same collaborators from these projects.

The script for Beyond Dream's Door was finalized in November 1987. Unable to secure funding, Spears enlisted the help of Ohio State film professor Richard Long, who allowed students to work on the film for class credit. This arrangement provided access to campus locations and university-owned film equipment.

The crew consisted of the film students, and the cast was composed of Woelfel's friends and local theatre actors from Columbus. To give his leading men something different to play, Woelfel reversed the roles of Kesler and Baldasare. Woelfel and his leads had previously worked with Norm Singer, who was cast as Professor Noxx, janitor John Dunleavey, and Marge Whitney, who played Julie's mother. For the role of Julie, Baldasare suggested Susan Pinsky, who had impressed him in a local stage production. Pinsky was only available for a limited time, as she was scheduled to depart for Los Angeles to begin her doctoral internship.

=== Principal Photography ===
Principal photography began on April 1, 1988, and continued through early July, spanning a total of 38 non-consecutive shooting days. 13 hours of footage was shot, 1600 edits were made to the final cut, and the film was delivered to the distributor in October.

Filming locations included the Ohio State University campus, the personal residences of Rick Kesler and Norm Singer, sewer tunnels provided by a city crew, and a condemned house used without official permission.

Woelfel deliberately chose not to replicate the original short film, and instructed most of the cast to underplay their performances to avoid theatrical overacting—common among local stage actors— though elder cast member Norm Singer was largely left to direct himself.

Production was plagued by a variety of technical and logistical setbacks, though the crew's enthusiasm remained consistently high. On the first day of filming, the crew experienced a major camera failure, and several scenes had to be discarded due to light leaks. Among the destroyed footage were scenes of Eric walking to and from Julie's house. Immediately after he wrapped, Rick Kesler shaved his head to portray Daddy Warbucks in a stage production of Annie. Anticipating potential reshoots, Kesler saved several long strands in a plastic bag. When it was later discovered that the walking scenes needed to be reshot, the production team awkwardly glued the saved hair back onto his scalp. Due to the limited amount of hair, the reconstruction was only sufficient for front-facing shots.

Additional complications arose throughout production, including practical mishaps, the presence of ticks on location, challenges with the film's special effects, and weather-related delays.

The majority of the budget was allocated to film stock and processing, leading the filmmakers to focus on maximizing the movie's visual appeal. To achieve this, they used a homemade camera dolly and crane for dynamic, sweeping shots, employed creative low-budget tricks, and even isolated the characters and switched out wall art between scenes to subtly unsettle viewers.

While the film was still in production, the crew attempted to generate interest by inviting local press for coverage and placing a listing in Variety under its “New Film Starts” section. The notice attracted attention from two distributors, including Panorama Entertainment, before filming had even concluded.

=== Post-Production ===
When the completed film was delivered to Panorama Entertainment, they expressed dissatisfaction with the short running time and insisted on the inclusion of nudity. Woelfel responded by writing new scenes featuring the "Dream Seductress," a manifestation of the film's monster, to bloat the film's length and replace earlier bedroom sequences with the puppet. Though casting proved difficult due to the nudity requirement, five women auditioned, and model/dancer Darby Vasbinder ultimately won the role. Woelfel retained the slate from the final day of reshoots, dated September 1, 1988.

To further extend the runtime, Woelfel inserted his short film Come to Me Softly into the feature. This short starred Kesler and appeared in its entirety as a dream sequence after Eric laid down in bed. It was removed from the director's cut and included as a bonus feature on the DVD and Blu-ray releases.

The original sound mix was completed under tight constraints, and Woelfel had just over two days to record the entire score. Although the schedule was limited, he reused themes composed for the original short film and had developed additional material during the shoot.

== Release ==
The film was first released in the United States on VHS by VidAmerica on April 7, 1989, with a retail price of $79.98. Although one of the VidAmerica posters displays an R rating, the film was never submitted to the MPAA for classification, as it was released directly to video. The original VHS cover stated that the movie was not rated. The film's distributor failed to pay the filmmakers what they were owed, prompting a lawsuit that ultimately awarded them more than they were originally due.

In Japan, the movie was released by TCC Video on October 21, 1989, under the English title Beyond the Dream's Door and the Japanese title ヘルビヨンド, which translates to "Hell Beyond."

On December 5, 2006, Cinema Epoch debuted the shorter director's cut on DVD. This edition includes several special features, such as two audio commentary tracks, two of Woelfel's short films (the original 1983 Beyond Dream's Door and Come to Me Softly), an isolated score, deleted scenes, alternate takes, and behind-the-scenes footage.

Lo-Fi Video re-released the director's cut on both VHS and DVD, including some of the Cinema Epoch bonus features, and the video debut of the short film At the Door of Darkness.

On April 27, 2021, the independent label Vinegar Syndrome released the 80-minute director's cut of the film on Blu-ray for the first time, as part of their Home Grown Horrors: Volume 1 box set, which also includes the films Winterbeast (1992) and Fatal Exam (1990). This edition features a 2K restoration that was "painstakingly reconstructed shot by shot from its original, unedited 16mm camera negative." However, approximately five minutes of footage were sourced from a master tape due to the loss of several rolls of the original negative. The Vinegar Syndrome release also includes most of the bonus features from the Cinema Epoch DVD, in addition to two new commentary tracks and a newly produced making-of documentary. Several features from the earlier Cinema Epoch release—including a photo gallery, a short-to-feature comparison, behind-the-scenes footage from the making of Heartland of Darkness, and an acceptance speech Woelfel recorded after winning an award for the short film—were not carried over.

The film was originally edited on videotape, which made it unsuitable for theatrical screenings; however, Vinegar Syndrome's restoration produced a Digital Cinema Package that was made available for bookings through the American Genre Film Archive.

== Reception ==
As a low-budget, direct-to-video release, the film did not receive widespread critical attention, but the reviews it received were generally positive, with greater acclaim emerging after its blu-ray release.

The most widely circulated review came from Joe Bob Briggs, who awarded the film three stars and called it "one of the strangest movies I've ever seen." He added, "I've seen Yvonne De Carlo eating human toes, so this is a very high compliment." Briggs later printed a letter from director Jay Woelfel and joked, "I know you've heard this many times before, but I repeat: It's the finest movie about the Ohio State Psychology Department ever made."

John Thonen of Cinefantastique criticized the film's story and budgetary limitations but ultimately described it as "impressive," calling it "the most auspicious ultra-low-budget debut since Sam Raimi’s The Evil Dead." The article was published under the headline "Elm Street clone provides for an impressive directing debut," a comparison Thonen later disavowed. According to Woelfel, Thonen contacted him to clarify that the headline was not his and that he did not view the film as derivative of the A Nightmare on Elm Street franchise.

Phantom of the Movies awarded the film 3 1/2 stars, deducting half a star for "the pic's ultimate narrative decline and ultra-cheesy effects," but concluded, "we wouldn't hesitate to recommend [the film] to viewers with a yen for offbeat fright fare."

Writing for DVD Talk, Bill Gibron praised the film as "an experience that's refreshingly smart and weighty." He noted its originality and ambition, writing, "It avoids clichés and formulas to bring the stunningly surreal world of nightmares into painful perspective. As a result, instead of the same old craven crap, we are privileged to see one of the late '80s best independent fright films."

B&S About Movies praised its high concept and sleek appearance, describing it as "slick as hell" and likening it to Phantasm, concluding that the film was "exactly as great as you'd hope."

Mondo Digital noted "a strong Empire Films vibe... with the mixture of novice actors, Lovecraftian monsters, and shaggy plotting," and praised the Vinegar Syndrome release for its visual quality, stating it "looks great and even manages to make the SD inserts relatively painless when they hit."

Mondo Bizarro's Alec Pridgen observed, "If you like a more straightforward story, this won't sell you. If you're willing to go along for the ride, check this one out."

In contrast, Jeremy G. Butler of CHUD was less enthusiastic, describing it as "a student film with a lot of ambition." He added, "I’ve decided that I liked it, but the problem is that it took four viewings and a lot of mental sifting to come to that conclusion, and I don't think that casual viewers are going to give it that many chances to prove itself."

== Legacy ==
After the movie was completed, Woelfel relocated to Los Angeles—just as the video market was collapsing—and struggled to find steady work. Following more than a decade of floundering in Hollywood, he reunited with various cast and crew members to collaborate on the independent films Unseen Evil, Ghost Lake, Horatio's Hamlet, Closed for the Season, and Asylum of Darkness.

Both Ghost Lake and Asylum of Darkness were originally conceived as follow-ups to Beyond Dream's Door; the latter starred Baldasare and has been described as a "spiritual sequel."

Many of the collaborators have remained close over the years, with Kesler officiating Woelfel's wedding and Baldasare serving as his best man.

In 2025, Garch the Great expanded the poem featured in the film into a full-length song and accompanying music video, which was designed to evoke the feeling of a vintage promotional clip. He obtained authorization from Woelfel and several crew members prior to releasing the song on YouTube.
