= Will Lyman =

American actor (born 1948)

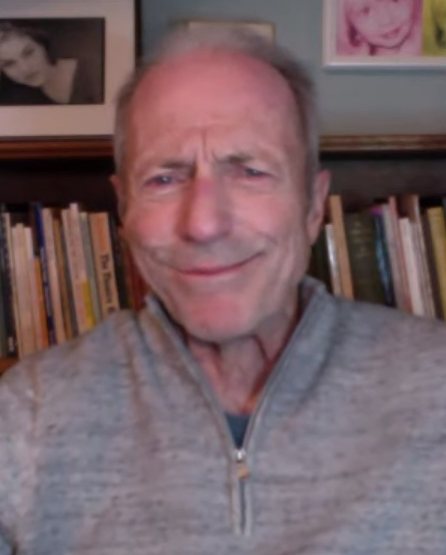
- Lyman in 2021
- Born: William Remington Lyman; May 20, 1948 (age 78); Burlington, Vermont, U.S.
- Education: Boston University School of Fine and Applied Art (BFA, 1971)
- Occupation: Actor
- Spouse: Anastasia Sylvester (m. 1972-)
- Children: 1

William Remington Lyman (born May 20, 1948) is an American actor. Known for his polished, resonant voice, he has narrated the PBS series Frontline since its second season in 1984. He played the lead role of William Tell, in the action/adventure television series Crossbow.

== Early life and education ==
Lyman was born in Burlington, Vermont, the son of Mabry (née Remington), an editor and educator, and Edward Phelps Lyman, an educator. He is a 1971 graduate of Boston University School of Fine and Applied Art. In the early 1970s, he worked for Allston Piano.

== Career ==
Lyman was a first-chair bass player with a number of amateur and semi-professional symphonic and chamber orchestras.

His film career began with a small part in the 1975 movie Jaws. In 1979 he played Ken Alexander in episodes of the daytime TV soap opera series Ryan's Hope, and appeared in other daytime TV serials.

Lyman narrated the highly rated Vietnam: A Television History, a 13-part documentary series about the war that was produced by WGBH in Boston in 1983 and broadcast nationally by PBS.

In 1984, he became the exclusive narrator of PBS' long-running Frontline television series and is best known as such.

Since changing his focus to the theater, he has made a successful career in television, theater and film, including appearances in Welcome to the Dollhouse and Mother/Android, and as narrator of the 2006 film Little Children. He has also appeared on the TV shows Commander in Chief, in which he portrayed the President of the United States (whose death in the story elevates Geena Davis' Mackenzie Allen to the office), and also appeared in TV shows Threat Matrix, The West Wing and Law & Order.

Other of his voice-over credits include documentaries for National Geographic, The History Channel, The Discovery Channel and The Learning Channel. Lyman has narrated many episodes of the WGBH-TV Nova series (including the Frontline partnership, What's Up With The Weather?).

He narrated a series of commercials for the Mexican beer Dos Equis, revolving around their character of "The Most Interesting Man in the World", portrayed onscreen by actor Jonathan Goldsmith.

Lyman has provided the voice for many commercials of the German automaker BMW. He played the award ceremony narrator in the 2008 movie Iron Man.

In the January 26, 2014 episode of The Simpsons, "Specs and the City", Lyman spoofed his Frontline voiceovers.

In 2018, he provided the narration for the documentary Trump's Showdown.

Lyman continued to be active and appear on stage at the Huntington Theatre Company in Boston, Massachusetts in Romeo and Juliet (2019), Guess Who's Coming to Dinner (2014), All My Sons (2010) and Dead End (2000).

Since 2002, Lyman has been involved with the Commonwealth Shakespeare Company as Chairman of the Board (2002–2014) and as a member of the board of Trustees (2002–).

He was a board member of the Screen Actors Guild for two years.

== Personal life ==
In 1972, Lyman married the late Anastasia Sylvester. They had one daughter, Georgia. They lived in the greater Boston area.

== Selected awards and honors ==
Voice Over Body Shop - Ep.198 with Will Lyman

- 2013 Elliot Norton Prize for Sustained Excellence (The Boston Theater Critics Association)
- 2015 NETC Award
- Howard Keel Award for service to the Screen Actors Guild
- IRNE Awards
- 2022 Peabody Award for narration on the documentary The Power of Big Oil
