= Children of the Caribbean Foundation =

US-based nonprofit organization

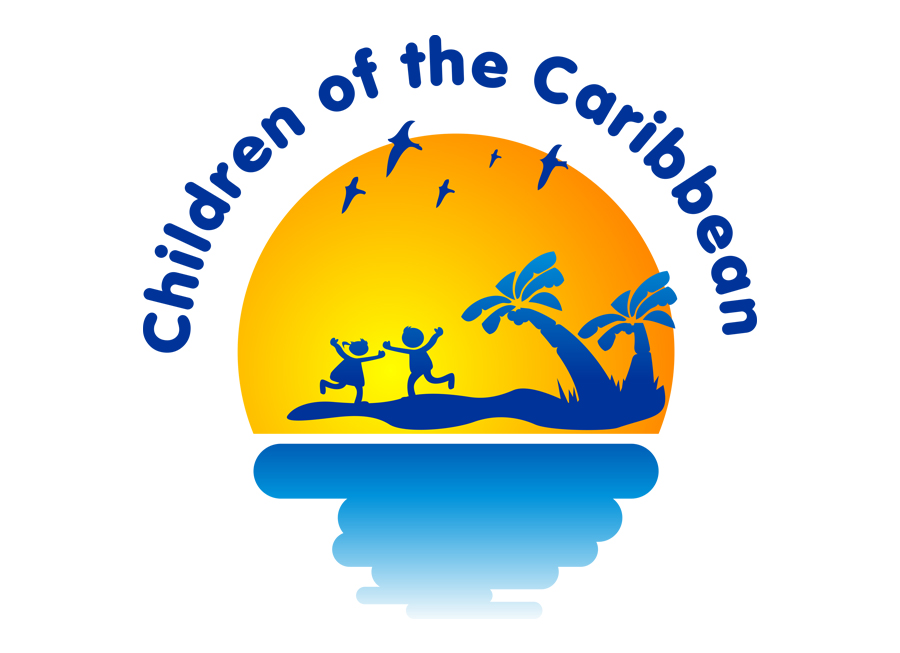
- Founded: 2010
- Founders: Rosie Hodge-Adams; Julien Adams
- Type: Non-Profit Organization (IRS exemption status): 501(c)(3)
- Purpose: Education, Healthcare, Social Development
- Location: Los Angeles, California, United States of America
- Region served: The Caribbean, Los Angeles, California
- Key people: Julien Adams, Esq., Co-Founder and President
- Website: www.childrenofthecaribbean.org
- Formerly called: Children of the Caribbean, Inc. (2010-2012)

Children of the Caribbean Foundation (COTC or Children of the Caribbean Inc.) is a 501(c)(3) non-profit organization based in Beverly Hills, California. The organization provides relief and assistance to disadvantaged children across the Caribbean and in Los Angeles in three areas: education, healthcare and social development. Children of the Caribbean Foundation is governed by a board of trustees.

== History ==
In June 2010, the foundation was formed by Rosie Hodge-Adams and her husband Julien Adams as Children of the Caribbean, Inc. It delivered a supply of backpacks to children on the island of Anguilla three months later in September, following the tropical depression Fiona, which caused flooding and damage to the island.

With the support of Eric Close, Children of the Caribbean Foundation hosted a fundraiser "The Every Child Matters 5K Run/Walk" in June 2011, at Loyola Marymount University to raise money for its Education Initiative. In 2011, needy children on the Caribbean islands of Anguilla, Dominica, Trinidad and Jamaica were provided with backpacks containing calculators, notebooks, pens, pencils, dictionaries and other school supplies for the 2011–2012 school year. That year, the foundation awarded its first COTC Scholarship.

In November 2011, the Foundation held a fund-raiser in support of the Cyril Ross Nursery in Trinidad, which cares for and educates children with HIV. Actor Blair Underwood and actress Stacey Dash recorded videos in support.

In 2012, the Foundation constructed the pharmacy at Cyril Ross and made repairs to the home. The Every Child Matters 5K was held for the second time at Loyola Marymount University in June. The Foundation doubled the number of children who received school supplies, and the islands of St. Vincent and Dominica were added to the list of Caribbean countries to receive assistance. Also during the Summer of 2012, the foundation launched a social development program – Project Aspire in Barbados. The program was hosted by Actress Victoria Rowell.

In 2013, as its healthcare initiative, the foundation installed flush toilets and upgraded the sanitary system at the Salt Spring Primary School in Jamaica. The programs of the organization continued to expand, and in 2013 the Foundation installed a playground on the island and also hosted a free volleyball camp for children living there. That year the charity contributed to the education of seven students in Anguilla.

In 2014, a pre-school for children with special needs was established on the island of St. Vincent by the foundation.

In 2015, the COCF set up a foundation in St. Kitts in memory of Nurse Ruth Hodge, and gave out baby care products to new mothers.
