= Witch Story =

- Directed by: Alessandro Capone
- Screenplay by: Rosario Galli; Alessandro Capone
- Story by: Alessandro Capone
- Produced by: Alessandro Capone; Mauro Morigi; Giuseppe Pedersoli
- Starring: Amy Adams; Jeff Bankert; Ian Bannen
- Cinematography: Roberto Girometti
- Edited by: Franca Silvi
- Music by: Carlo Maria Cordio
- Production companies: United Entertainment Corporation; Numero Uno International
- Distributed by: Titanus
- Release date: 26 May 1989 (Italy)
- Running time: 90 minutes
- Country: Italy

Witch Story (Italian: Streghe (Witches)) is a 1989 Italian horror film directed by Alessandro Capone.

== Synopsis ==
The film follows Ed and Carol Hayes, a pair of siblings who have inherited an old farmhouse in Micanopy, Florida after their parents' deaths. They are unaware that fifty years prior, one of their relatives, Helena was burned at the stake as a witch while her daughter Rachel watched. Helena cursed the townspeople and after her death, coaxed Rachel to kill herself by jumping off a balcony.

The siblings travel to Micanopy with several of their friends to fix the place up. They begin seeing Rachel around the farm, unwilling to believe that she is a ghost. Eventually Rachel possesses all of the women, with the exception of Carol, and uses them to murder all of the men. Only Carol's boyfriend, Paul, survives. They discover the history of the farm and that a priest involved with the deaths, Father Matthew, is still alive. He confesses that Helena is obsessed with him and will not allow him to die on his own. Years prior she had formed a contract with Satan to seduce him, which resulted in her giving birth to Rachel. Father Matthew is reluctant to battle Helena, but is forced to confront her when she tracks the pair to his home. The two do battle over Rachel's soul and the lives of Paul and Carol, resulting in the priest successfully destroying Helena. Her mother defeated, Rachel disappears.

The police arrive to retrieve the bodies and assess the chaos. Paul and Carol are taken into police protection, while Father Matthew wanders off into the town. Some time later the couple have settled into a domestic life together. Carol dreams that a possessed Father Matthew has appeared and murdered Paul. The film ends with her coming downstairs and screaming at an unseen sight.

== Cast ==
- Amy Adams as Susan
- Jeff Bankert as Michael
- Ian Bannen as Father Matthew
- Charon Butler as Gloria
- Todd Conatser as Virgil
- John Freda as Alex Hayes
- Peter Gold as Father Gabriel
- Elise Hirby as Maria Hayes
- Deanna Lund as Helena
- Jason M. Lefkowitz as Paul
- Christopher Peacock as Ken
- Nancie Sanderson as Simona
- Michele Peacock as Carol Hayes
- Suzanne Law as Rachel

== Production ==
Witch Story was the directorial debut of Alessandro Capone. Capone had previously worked as a screenwriter since the mid-1970s including a few horror films such as Body Count. Capone stated that he was a fan of horror films and wanted his debut to be a horror film. He had the international distributor Manolo Bolognini to give him a new guaranteed minimum to help start the project. The film was shot partially in Rome but predominantly in Mount Dora, Florida. Per Milt Guss, the city's mayor was repulsed by the film's script, calling it "revolting and offensive".

== Release ==
Witch Story was distributed in Italy by Titanus on 26 May 1989. The film was released in the United Kingdom as Witch Story, in other English territories as Superstion 2 due its similarities to the film Superstition. In Germany the film was released as a sequel to Larry Cohen's Wicked Stepmother which was titled Tanz der Hexen with Witch Story being titled Tanz der Hexen Teil 2.

The film was later restored for a release through Vinegar Syndrome.

== Reception ==
In Italy, Leonardo Autera of Corriere della Sera gave the film a negative review noting "slapdash editing, full of inconsistencies", "coarse special effects" and an "amateur cast" outside Ian Bannen whom the reviewer noted looked bored in the film.

== See also ==
- List of Italian films of 1989
- List of horror films of 1989

== Footnotes ==
=== Sources ===
- Autera, Leonardo (May 26, 1989). "La casa disabitata nella radura". Corriere della Sera (in Italian).
- Curti, Roberto (2019). Italian Gothic Horror Films, 1980-1989. McFarland. ISBN 978-1476672434.
- Grassi, Giovanna (November 18, 1988). "Cinema e gente". Corriere della Sera (in Italian).
