= Steele Justice =

- Movie poster
- Directed by: Robert Boris
- Written by: Robert Boris
- Produced by: Thomas Coleman; Michael Rosenblatt; John Strong
- Starring: Martin Kove; Sela Ward; Ronny Cox; Bernie Casey; Joseph Campanella; Jan Gan Boyd
- Cinematography: John M. Stephens
- Edited by: Steven Rosenblum; John A. O'Connor
- Music by: Misha Segal
- Production company: Atlantic Entertainment Group
- Distributed by: Atlantic Releasing Corporation
- Release date: May 8, 1987
- Country: United States
- Language: English
- Box office: $1,327,740 (US)

Steele Justice is a 1987 American action film written and directed by Robert Boris and starring Martin Kove, Sela Ward, and Bernie Casey.

== Plot ==
John Steele is a Vietnam Vet who had trouble adjusting to life after the war. He hasn't been able to hold on to a job which includes being a cop. When his best friend Lee, who also served with him in Vietnam and who also became a cop, was killed by some drug dealers he was investigating, Steele was able to save his daughter and saw one of the shooters. He later sees him and learns that he is the son of General Kwan, another person he served with in Vietnam who was running his own deals on the side, and who tried to kill Steele and Lee but Steele not only survived but thwarted his plan. Steele suspects Kwan is involved with Lee's death but unfortunately Kwan's a respected member of the community. Steele's former boss Bennett is not in a rush to find the killers because investigation reveals that Lee may have been dirty, which Steele knows is not true. Steele sets out to prove Lee's innocence and to get Kwan.

=== Taglines ===
"When the police needed someone to stop the Vietnamese Mafia, there was only one choice..."

"You don't recruit John Steele. You unleash him."

"The only law is the Black Tiger's. The only justice is John Steele's."

== Cast ==
- Martin Kove as John Steele
- Sela Ward as Tracy
- Ronny Cox as Bennett
- Bernie Casey as Detective Tom Reese
- Joseph Campanella as Harry
- Jan Gan Boyd as Cami
- Shannon Tweed as Angela Spinelli
- Kevin Gage as Army Sergeant
- Sarah Douglas as Kay
- Soon-Tek Oh as General Bon Soong Kwan
- Irene Tsu as Xua Chan

== Critical reception ==
Janet Maslin of The New York Times had disdain for the film:

Steele Justice isn't designed as a comedy, but it does earn high marks for inadvertent humor... Mr. Kove wears a Band-Aid across the bridge of his nose during much of the film, and it is by far the most expressive thing on his face.

Maslin further commented, "This is thanks in part to the writer and director, Robert Boris, whose Oxford Blues was no laughing matter but who this time has tried to meld Rambo with Miami Vice, throwing in a touch of the Chippendales' calendar. The last is evoked by the presence of Martin Kove, the big, burly, smirking fellow in the title role."

Leonard Maltin called the film a ’Howlingly absurd action-revenge yarn’ while TV Guide wrote, ’Unintentionally hilarious "Rambo"-inspired action picture featuring the muscle-bound Martin Kove as John Steele, a Vietnam vet having trouble adjusting to postwar life in southern California.’
