= Electra Glide in Blue =

1973 film by James William Guercio

- Theatrical release poster
- Directed by: James William Guercio
- Screenplay by: Robert Boris
- Story by: Robert Boris; Rupert Hitzig
- Produced by: James William Guercio; Rupert Hitzig
- Starring: Robert Blake; Billy "Green" Bush; Mitchell Ryan; Jeannine Riley; Elisha Cook
- Cinematography: Conrad Hall
- Edited by: Jim Benson; Gerald R. Greenberg; John F. Link
- Music by: James William Guercio
- Production company: Guercio-Hitzig
- Distributed by: United Artists
- Release date: August 19, 1973
- Running time: 114 minutes
- Country: United States
- Language: English
- Box office: $1.6 million (US/Canada rentals)

Electra Glide in Blue is a 1973 American satirical black comedy action film, starring Robert Blake as a motorcycle cop in Arizona and Billy "Green" Bush as his partner. It was produced and directed by James William Guercio, and is named after the Harley-Davidson Electra Glide motorcycle issued to traffic cops.

Blake stars as a police officer on motorcycle patrol in Arizona who seeks promotion to the homicide squad, only to become embroiled in workplace politics and investigation into a group of hippies he is friendly with.

The soundtrack was performed by members of the band Chicago, who also briefly appear as actors in bit parts; Guercio managed them at the time and produced many of their albums. The band that appeared in concert during the film was Madura.

Critical reception was mixed to positive, describing Electa Glide in Blue as having excellent cinematography but being quirky and uneven in tone.

== Plot ==
John Wintergreen is a motorcycle cop who patrols the rural Arizona highways with his partner Zipper. Wintergreen is an experienced patrolman looking to be transferred to the Homicide unit. When he is informed by Crazy Willie of an apparent suicide-by-shotgun, Wintergreen believes the case is actually a murder as the victim was shot in the chest rather than the head, which is more usual. Detective Harve Poole agrees it is a homicide, after a .22 bullet is found amongst the pellets in the man's chest during the autopsy, as well as hearing about a possible missing $5,000 ($36,300 today) from the man's home, and arranges for Wintergreen to be transferred to homicide to help with the case.

Wintergreen gets his wish, but his joy is short-lived. He begins increasingly to identify with the hippies whom the other officers, including Detective Poole, are endlessly harassing. The final straw comes when Poole discovers that Wintergreen has been sleeping with his girlfriend, Jolene. The hostile workplace politics cause him to be quickly demoted back to traffic enforcement.

While demoted, Wintergreen solves the murder. The killer is Willie, who confesses while Wintergreen goads him into talking about it. Wintergreen supposes Willie did it because he was jealous of the old man he killed, who frequently had young people over to his house to buy drugs. Shortly after, it is discovered that Zipper stole the $5,000, which he used to buy a fully dressed blue Electra Glide motorcycle. Upon this discovery, Zipper becomes distressed and belligerent and shoots at Wintergreen, striking an innocent bystander. Wintergreen shoots him square in the chest.

Wintergreen, now alone and back on his old beat, runs into a hippie that Zipper was needlessly harassing earlier on a previous stop. Recognizing him, Wintergreen lets him off with a warning, but the hippie forgets his driver's license, and Wintergreen drives up behind his van to return it to him. The hippie's passenger points a shotgun out of the back window and shoots Wintergreen, killing him.

== Cast ==
- Robert Blake as Officer John Wintergreen
- Billy "Green" Bush as Officer "Zipper" Davis
- Mitchell Ryan as Detective Harve Poole
- Jeannine Riley as Jolene
- Elisha Cook as Willie
- Royal Dano as Coroner
- Hawk Wolinski as VW Bus Driver
- Peter Cetera as Bob Zemko
- Terry Kath as Killer
- Lee Loughnane as "Pig Man"
- Walter Parazaider as "Loose Lips"
- Joe Samsil as Sergeant Ryker
- Jason Clark as L.A. Detective
- Michael Butler as Truck Driver
- Susan Forristal as Ice Cream Girl
- Nick Nolte as Hippie (uncredited)

== Production ==
First-time director James William Guercio took a salary of one dollar in order to have budget available to hire Conrad Hall as the cinematographer. During their discussions, it transpired that Guercio and Hall disagreed on how the film should look; a compromise was reached where Guercio would shoot the exterior scenes in a manner reminiscent of John Ford's films (which was the look Guercio wanted to achieve), while Hall could set up and shoot all the interior scenes any way he saw fit. In the DVD commentary, Guercio says a majority of the film was shot without permits, because the Arizona Highway Patrol did not cooperate with production. Filming was in Monument Valley and Fountain Hills, Arizona.

Prior to production an LAPD Motor Officer (Gerald L. Ray) was hired to teach Blake how to properly ride a Police Motorcycle. They spent more than a month riding replicas of Police Motorcycles around the Van Nuys area. Production was several days behind schedule due to Guercio's inexperience as a director. In Blake's 2012 autobiography Tales From a Rascal, he refers to this film as being a very tough shoot and that he essentially co-directed the picture with Hall while Guercio "stood around".

Guercio was best known as the producer of the rock band Chicago. Members of the band appear in the film in minor roles, including Peter Cetera, Terry Kath, Lee Loughnane and Walter Parazaider, as well as Hawk Wolinski from the Guercio-produced band Madura. Chicago members also perform on the movie soundtrack. The soundtrack album also included a four-page fold-out poster of Robert Blake standing beside his cycle on a bluff overlooking Monument Valley.

Blake complained about production woes and lamented his $20,000 fee for a starring role. In addition, he spoke badly of the film (though not mentioning it by name) on The Tonight Show Starring Johnny Carson. However his performance caught the attention of television executives and led to the police drama series Baretta, for which he is most known.

== Release ==
=== Home media ===
Released on VHS in Australia by Warner Home Video in 1983. Released on VHS in 1988 in North America by MGM/UA Home Video, and in Greece by Audio Visual Enterprises.

Electra Glide in Blue was released on DVD by MGM on March 22, 2005. A Blu-ray was released on June 4, 2013 by Shout! Factory. Another Blu-ray was released on August 16, 2022 by Kino Lorber Studio Classics.

== Reception ==
The film received a review in The New York Times, which described it as "portentous" but portraying "very ordinary or very embarrassing things: a crudely staged bike chase, or the confessions of a demoralized bar girl in what looks and sounds like a second-year acting exercise in drama school."

The film was entered into the 1973 Cannes Film Festival. Robert Blake was nominated for a Golden Globe for his performance.

In 2012, Time magazine called Electra Glide in Blue "A neglected cult-classic that could have only come from (or have been made in) the early '70s" and said: "It's a quirky but unforgettable movie—part character study, part examination of an emerging youth culture—featuring some outstanding camerawork from future Oscar-winning cinematographer Conrad Hall." The film has a 69% rating on Rotten Tomatoes from 13 reviews.
