= Jan Gan Boyd =

American film and television actress

- Born: United States
- Education: University of California, Davis
- Occupations: Actress, dancer
- Spouse: John Boyd (divorced)

Jan Gan Boyd (sometimes credited as Jan Gan) is an American film and television actress and dancer best known for starring roles in such films as A Chorus Line, Assassination, and Steele Justice and guest roles on the television series Sisters and Cheers.

In 1986 Boyd was featured in a profile in The Hollywood Reporter about the challenges of Asian American actresses finding roles in Hollywood. Boyd said in the article, "There are two major problems for Asian actresses in movies and TV," she said. "The first and hardest to understand is the practice of hiring Caucasians to play Asian roles. It brings to mind the old days when whites played black characters by wearing blackface." Boyd then said, "A good example of that was Joel Grey playing an ancient Korean in the 'Remo Williams' picture. There were dozens of Asians who could have played that role. Another example is the South American actress who was hired to play an Asian in Eddie Murphy's new picture."

Boyd met her husband, John Boyd, a veterinarian, while both were attending the University of California, Davis. They have since divorced.

== Filmography ==
- 1985 A Chorus Line as Connie Wong
- 1987 Assassination as Charlotte Chang
- 1987 Steele Justice as Cami
