= Buy & Cell =

1987 film by Robert Boris

- Video release poster
- Directed by: Robert Boris
- Written by: Ken Krauss; Merrin Holt
- Story by: Leonard Montana; Louis Peraino
- Produced by: Charles Band; Frank Yablans
- Starring: Robert Carradine; Randall "Tex" Cobb; Imogene Coca; Malcolm McDowell
- Cinematography: Daniele Nannuzzi
- Music by: Mark Shreeve
- Production company: Empire Pictures
- Distributed by: Trans World Entertainment
- Release dates: May 15, 1988 (Cannes Film Festival); June 16, 1988 (West Germany); January 27, 1989 (USA)
- Running time: 98 minutes
- Country: United States
- Language: English

Buy & Cell is a 1988 comedy film directed by Robert Boris. The original music score was composed by Mark Shreeve.This is a comedy film that satirizes the American financial system through a prison setting, where inmates engage in entrepreneurial activities.

== Premise ==
Herbie Altman is framed by his business partner and sent to jail where he sets up "Con Inc." an investment company with the help of those around him. This is due to the fact that he helped a fellow inmate to invest his money. He runs the business under the nose of the police wardens.

== Principal cast ==
- Robert Carradine as Herbie Altman
- Michael Winslow as Sly
- Malcolm McDowell as Warden Tennant
- Lise Cutter as Dr. Ellen Scott
- Randall "Tex" Cobb as Wolf
- Ben Vereen as Shaka
- Tony Plana as Raoul
- Roddy Piper as "Cowboy"
- Michael Goodwin as Reggie
- Fred Travalena as "VCR"
- Mickey Knox as Arthur
- Tony Carroll as "Duke"

== Availability ==
The movie was released on videocassette in 1989 by New World. The tape itself is notable for having trailers for the films Warlock and The Punisher, both of which were passed on to separate studios after New World fell into bankruptcy. In 1991, Starmaker Video released a tape in the EP Mode. A DVD has been released in Australia and in the Netherlands, but as of December 22, 2009, no plans for a Region 1 DVD have been announced.

== Critical reception ==
Leonard Maltin called the film an "uninteresting would-be comedy." TV Guide wrote, "Clumsy financial satire set in the USA but shot cheaply in Italy. [...] Despite (or perhaps because of) its virtuous intentions, Buy & Cell is dated and largely unfunny." The All Movie Guide review opined, "Lame, predictable story which wastes a talanted [sic] cast.
