= Backstreet Dreams (film) =

- Directed by: Rupert Hitzig; Jason O'Malley
- Written by: Jason O'Malley
- Produced by: Jason O'Malley; Lance H. Robbins
- Starring: Brooke Shields; Jason O'Malley; Sherilyn Fenn
- Cinematography: Stephen M. Katz
- Music by: Bill Conti
- Distributed by: Vidmark Entertainment
- Release dates: August 24, 1990 (Canada); September 29, 1990 (New York City)
- Running time: 96 minutes
- Country: United States
- Language: English

Backstreet Dreams (released as Forever Love in the Philippines) is a 1990 American drama film starring Brooke Shields, Jason O'Malley, Sherilyn Fenn and Anthony Franciosa. It was directed by Rupert Hitzig and Jason O'Malley, from a script written by O'Malley.

== Plot ==
Dean, a young hood, and his wife Lucy take their disturbed young son, Shane, to a clinic where the boy is diagnosed by Stevie, a psychologist. They discover that the boy is autistic. As the couple's marriage falls apart, Stevie believes she can help Shane as well as possibly help Dean break away from the life of crime he leads.

== Main cast ==
- Brooke Shields as Stevie
- Jason O'Malley as Dean
- Anthony Franciosa as Angelo
- John Vizzi and Joseph Vizzi as Shane
- Burt Young as Luca
- Sherilyn Fenn as Lucy
- Tony Fields as Manny
- Nick Cassavetes as Mikey
- Joe Pantoliano as Paul (uncredited)

== Release ==
Backstreet Dreams was released in the United States in 1990. In the Philippines, the film was released as Forever Love in January 1992.
