= Assassination (1987 film) =

1987 American action film

- Theatrical release poster
- Directed by: Peter Hunt
- Written by: Richard Sale
- Based on: novel My Affair with the President's Wife by Richard Sale
- Produced by: Pancho Kohner
- Starring: Charles Bronson; Jill Ireland; Stephen Elliott; Jan Gan Boyd; Randy Brooks; Michael Ansara; William Prince
- Cinematography: Hanania Baer
- Edited by: James T. Heckert
- Music by: Valentine McCallum; Robert O. Ragland
- Distributed by: Cannon Films
- Release date: January 9, 1987 (US)
- Running time: 88 minutes
- Country: United States
- Language: English
- Box office: $6,075,793 (US)

Assassination is a 1987 American action thriller film directed by Peter Hunt and starring Charles Bronson, Jill Ireland, Charles Howerton, Jan Gan Boyd, Stephen Elliott, and Chris Alcaide. The plot is about a bodyguard who is assigned to protect the First Lady of the United States against an assassination plot.

== Plot ==
Jay Killian is a senior member of the Secret Service. On the day before the Inauguration of the new president, Killian has just returned from a six-week sick leave. He is given a new assignment: to protect the First Lady, Lara Royce Craig.

Being highly qualified and a seasoned veteran of the service, Killian is dismayed that he is not on the Presidential detail. To make matters worse, Lara proves to be an extremely difficult charge. She is arrogant, condescending, demanding, and she detests the presence of Killian.

With the First Lady doing what she wants and ignoring all of Killian's suggestions, it becomes apparent that someone wants Lara dead, especially when a biker tries to shoot her.

A wild cross-country adventure ensues as Killian attempts to protect Lara and flush out the assassin and his contractor—and the assassination attempts may have originated from the White House.

It turns out that, because of a war injury, the President is impotent and his wife is about to file for divorce at the end of his first term. Believing that the divorce will eliminate the chances of another term, the president's co-conspirators staged the assassination attempts, to keep the President's impotence a secret and gain him the people's support in his grief.

Killian is able to unravel the conspiracy.

== Cast ==
- Charles Bronson as Agent Jay Killian
- Jill Ireland as First Lady Lara Royce Craig
- Stephen Elliott as Fitzroy
- Jan Gan Boyd as Charlotte Chang
- Randy Brooks as Tyler Loudermilk
- James Lemp as Eddie Bracken
- Michael Ansara as Senator Hector Bunsen
- James Staley as Briggs
- Kathryn Leigh Scott as Polly Sims
- Jim McMullan as The Zipper
- William Prince as H.H. Royce
- Charles Howerton as President Calvin Craig
- Chris Alcaide as Chief Justice
- Robert Dowdell as Captain "Cappy" Ogilvie

== Production ==
=== Development ===
The film was Jill Ireland's first in three years following an operation for breast cancer. (Ireland had been co-producer on Murphy's Law.) "I was terribly grateful to Menahem and Yoram for wanting me for the part," Ireland said. "I'd thought the cancer might have ended my acting career. They asked me to do the film at my birthday party last year and it was the best present I could have received. It validates the fact that I'm working, feeling good, looking good and able to spend long hours on the set. I think my return to work proves, at least to me, that there is life after cancer."

It was originally called My Affair With the President's Wife, then The President's Wife, The Assassin and finally, Assassination.

The film's producer Pancho Kohner wanted the film called The President's Wife and as "far as we're concerned, it's not going to be called anything else." A Cannon spokesman said "There was some concern that `Assassin' might have a negative connotation and the crew might not get cooperation-people in Washington are worried about terrorism."

"Someone thought the original title might be insulting to the presidency of the United States, so they changed it," said Bronson "There's an assassination involved so they stuck with that. They didn't want to scare off people who come to see my films with a title like President's Wife. It's not what people expect from one of my pictures."

=== Filming ===
The film was shot in May 1986. Ireland says the first week "everyone was solicitous" but after that she was "treated like everyone else."

== Reception ==
=== Box office ===
The film opened at number six at the US box office, earning $2.8 million in its first week.
