= Augustin Legrand =

French actor

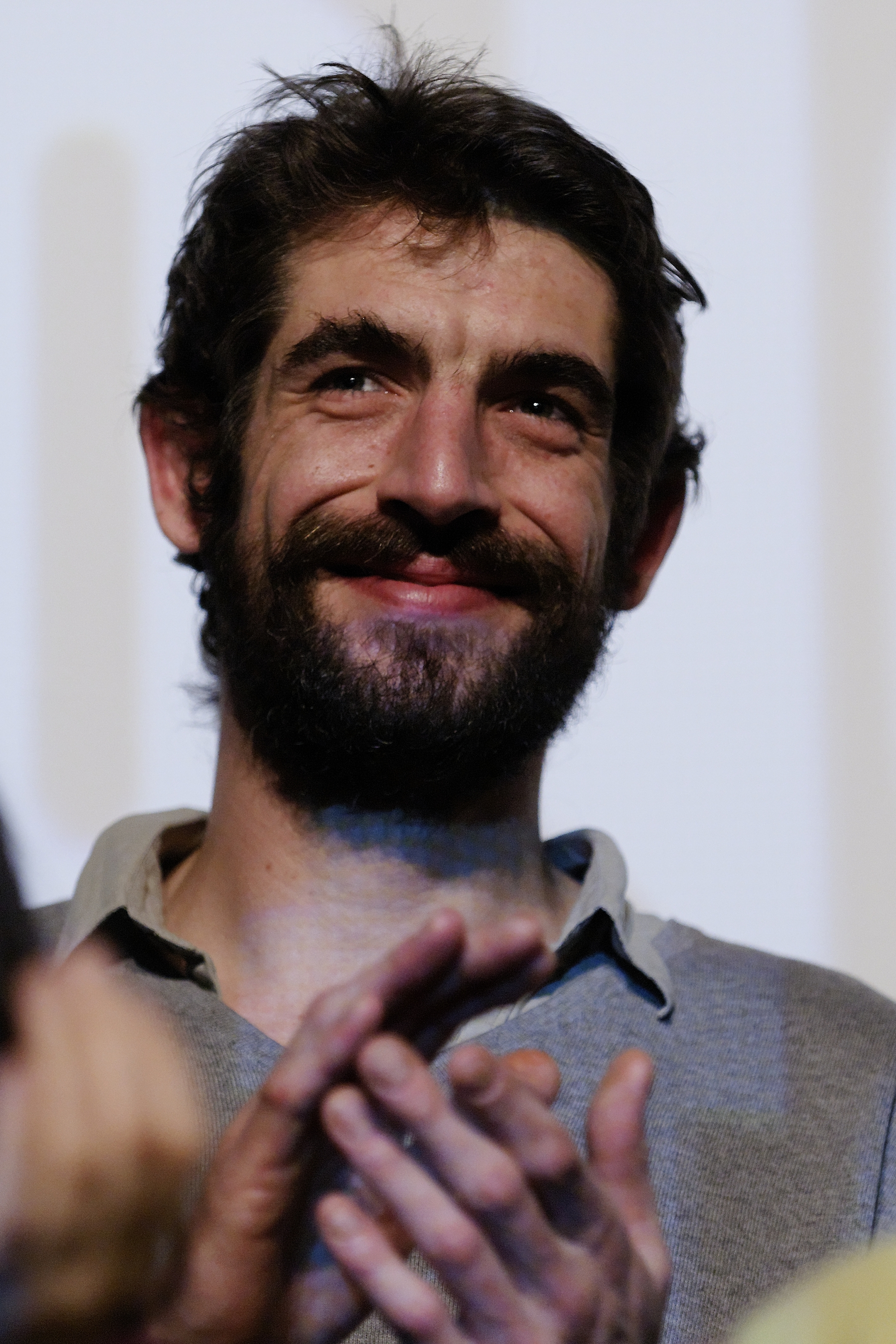
Legrand in 2010

Augustin Legrand is a French actor. He replaced Jonathan Goldsmith as Dos Equis' Most Interesting Man in the World in 2016.
