= Richard Friedman (filmmaker) =

American director, producer and writer

- Born: Brooklyn, New York, U.S.
- Occupations: Director, producer, writer
- Years active: 1984–present
- Website: Orichardfriedmanfilm.com

Richard Friedman is an American director, producer, and writer known for his work in motion pictures, television, and music videos. He has directed over 15 feature films, including Born, Thou Shalt Kill, and Acts of Desperation. His career spans network television, episodic series, and music videos, collaborating with major studios and notable actors.

== Early life and education ==
Richard Friedman was born in Brooklyn, New York. He earned a Bachelor of Science degree in Biology from Brooklyn College before pursuing filmmaking at the New York University Graduate School of Film, where he received a Master of Fine Arts in Motion Picture Directing and Film Production.

== Career ==
=== Feature films ===
Friedman has directed and produced multiple feature films across various genres, including:

- Thou Shalt Kill (2025) – starring Vince Lozano and Augie Duke
- Acts of Desperation (2018) – starring Paul Sorvino and Jason Gedrick
- Christmas Crime Story (2016) – starring Adrian Paul and Eric Close
- Born (2007) – starring Alison Brie, Denise Crosby, and Joan Severance
- 5th & Alameda (2011) – starring Corey Sevier and Mario Van Peebles
- DarkWolf (2003) – starring Samaire Armstrong and Tippi Hedren
- Phantom of the Mall: Eric's Revenge (1989) – starring Pauly Shore and Morgan Fairchild
- Scared Stiff (1987) – starring Mary Page Keller and Andrew Stevens

His films have been distributed by companies such as Lionsgate and Twentieth Century Fox.

=== Television ===
Friedman has directed over 35 episodes of network and syndicated television series, including:

- Lois & Clark: The New Adventures of Superman (Warner Bros.)
- Baywatch Nights (All American TV)
- Silk Stalkings (Stu Segall Productions)
- Friday the 13th: The Series (Paramount Television)
- Tales from the Darkside (Laurel Entertainment)
- Monsters (Laurel Entertainment)

He also directed television movies such as:

- Shadow of a Stranger (1992) – starring Joan Chen and Parker Stevenson
- In the Shadows, Someone's Watching (1993) – starring Daniel J. Travanti and Chris Noth
- Awake to Danger (1995) – starring Tori Spelling and Michael Gross

=== Music videos ===
Friedman directed music videos, including:

- "You're Only Human (Second Wind)" – Billy Joel
- "My, My, My" – Johnny Gill
- "Love Is for the Chosen" – Richie Havens

His video for Billy Joel's "You're Only Human (Second Wind)" was recognized for raising awareness about teen suicide.

=== Teaching and affiliations ===
Friedman has taught directing at UCLA and is currently an adjunct professor at the New York Film Academy. He is a member of the Directors Guild of America, Writers Guild of America, and the Television Academy of Arts and Sciences.
