= Robert Boris =

American screenwriter, film producer and director

- Born: Roberto Antonio Boris; October 12, 1945 (age 81); New York City, New York, U.S.
- Occupations: Film director; film producer; screenwriter
- Years active: 1973–present

Robert Boris (October 12, 1945) is an American screenwriter, film producer and director.

== Life and career ==
During the 1970s and 1980s, Robert Boris wrote or co-wrote various original or adapted screenplays and dialogues, either for TV or feature films, including Birds of Prey, Electra Glide in Blue (whose script was noted for its fatalism) and Some Kind of Hero, directed by Michael Pressman. He also wrote the screenplay for Doctor Detroit, his second collaboration with Pressman. Boris's work on the film is described as follows:

Meeting with screenwriter Robert Boris and director Michael Pressman at the latter's house, Aykroyd acted out scenes, cranking up the comedic volume as if he was overcompensating for the absence of Belushi. (...)This wasn’t exactly what the writers had originally had in mind. “I really wanted to do it as if it was Cary Grant and Katharine Hepburn in Bringing Up Baby, and the film ended up as a low-rent Marx Brothers comedy,” lamented Boris. Sure enough, as production proceeded over the summer of 1982, it became difficult to describe anything about Doctor Detroit as sophisticated or highbrow.

In 1983 Boris wrote the screenplay of the 4-part serialised film Blood Feud, focusing on the power struggle between Robert F. Kennedy and James R. Hoffa. The next year, he wrote and directed Oxford Blues. Regarding the film, Boris's debut as director, Peter Bart recalls:

Robert Boris, the clever young American writer-director, had done a creditable job in mounting his film, especially since this was his first directing stint, but he'd clearly had a lot of problems to overcome. First, the film had been shot on the proverbial shoestring. The uneven performances suggested a lack of coverage.

He is also the director of Steele Justice, Buy & Cell, Frank and Jesse, and Backyard Dogs.

Drafts or abandoned screenplays by Boris include the first draft for Air Force One, that producers wanted to submit to Ridley Scott.

== Awards ==
Boris won the WGA Award for Original/Adapted Multi-Part Long Form Series for Blood Feud in 1984.

== Filmography ==
=== As director only ===
- Buy & Cell (1988)

=== As writer and director ===
- Oxford Blues (1984)
- Steele Justice (1987)
- Frank and Jesse (1994)
- Backyard Dogs (2000)
- Little Hercules (2009), with Hulk Hogan

=== As writer only ===
- Birds of Prey (screenplay adapted from a story by himself Rupert Hitzig) (1973) (TV)
- Electra Glide in Blue (with Rupert Hitzig) (1973)
- Some Kind of Hero (screenplay adapted from James Kirkwood Jr.) (1982)
- Deadly Encounter (with David J. Kinghorn) (1982) (TV)
- Blood Feud (1983) (TV)
- Doctor Detroit (with Carl Gottlieb and Bruce Jay Friedman) (1983)
- Izzy and Moe (1985) (TV)
- Marilyn and Me (1991) (TV) (screenplay and story)
- Extreme Justice (with Frank Sacks) (1993)
- Diplomatic Siege (with Mark Amin, Sam Bernard and Kevin Bernhardt) (1999)
- Deep Freeze (with Dennis A. Pratt and Matthew Jason Walsh) (2001)
