= Christmas Crime Story =

2017 crime drama film by Richard Friedman

Christmas Crime Story is a 2017 multi-vignette crime drama directed by Richard Friedman. Written by Sean Chipman and Robert Chipman, the film features an ensemble cast that includes Adrian Paul, Eric Close, Aaron Perilo, Scott Bailey and Neraida Bega in leading roles.

Set during an abnormal heatwave in Los Angeles on Christmas Eve, the film revolves around multiple characters whose lives intersect before, during and after a liquor store robbery.

== Plot ==
A botched robbery leads down a destructive path for a detective (Bailey) attempting to reconcile with his estranged mother (Humes), a coming-apart-at-the-seams amateur photographer (Paul), his vindictive and murderous fiancée (Bega), her secret lover (Perilo) and a mall Santa (Close) struggling to remain sober.

== Cast ==
- Adrian Paul as David Carlisle
- Eric Close as Randall Edwards
- Neraida Bega as Sasha Harrington
- Aaron Perilo as Jason Houston
- Scott Bailey as Chris Dejesus
- Mary-Margaret Humes as Maggie DeJesus
- Tim DeZarn as Barrett Hill
- Alex Fernandez as Detective Ambrozik
- Vince Lozano as Vincent
- Mark Adair-Rios as James Anderson
- Linda Burzynski as Detective Thomas
- Sara Castro as Kasey Edwards
- Anthony Emerson as Matthew Winslow
- Bethany Carol as Lena
- Carlene Moore as News Reporter

== Production ==
=== Development ===
Originally conceived as a short film in 2010, Christmas Crime Story was the brainchild of Sean & Robert Chipman. The script went through development problems as, at two different points, the original script file had become corrupted and the file lost. In 2012, the screenplay was completed and uploaded to an online screenwriting site, SimplyScripts, and was found in May 2016 by director Richard Friedman. With Richard Friedman aboard to direct the film, changes in the script were requested, including: updating the setting from a small Massachusetts town to Los Angeles and updating the conditions from a blizzard to a heat wave. The film is produced by Markus Linecker, Richard Friedman and Vince Lozano.

=== Filming ===
Filming began on December 2, 2016 in Los Angeles, California and concluded on December 14, 2016.

== See also ==
- List of Christmas films
