= Birds of Prey (1973 film) =

- Genre: Action; Thriller; Crime
- Written by: Robert Boris
- Directed by: William A. Graham
- Starring: David Janssen; Ralph Meeker; Elayne Heilveil
- Music by: Jack Elliott; Allyn Ferguson
- Country of origin: United States
- Original language: English

Production
- Executive producer: Roger Gimbel
- Producer: Alan A. Armer
- Cinematography: Jordan Cronenweth
- Editor: Jim Benson
- Running time: 81 minutes
- Production company: Tomorrow Entertainment
- Budget: $400,000

Original release
- Network: CBS
- Release: January 30, 1973

Birds of Prey is a 1973 television film directed by William A. Graham and starring David Janssen, Ralph Meeker, and Elayne Heilveil. The screenplay was written by Robert Boris from a story by Boris and Rupert Hitzig. It is a crime action film depicting a radio station helicopter traffic reporter who, witnessing an armored car robbery, engages in a chase when the suspects flee in a vehicle and then switch to their own get-away helicopter.

== Plot ==
While flying his helicopter, Harry Walker observes an armed robbery of an armored car at the Zion's Bank in downtown Salt Lake City in which bearded men gun down the guards and grab a canvas sack of currency, then grab a female hostage and shove her into their getaway car. Over the radio, Walker reports what he has seen to his old military commander McAndrew. Walker then pursues the car, while McAndrew informs him that fingerprints have identified two of the robbers as former Marines who served in Vietnam and they surmise that the chopper pilot is similarly experienced. Their hostage is identified as Teresa Janice "T.J." Shaw, a bank employee, who is due to get married that Friday.

Walker rescues Ms. Shaw, who reveals that she has never been far from Salt Lake City in her 22 years and that she has known her fiancé since childhood. A gentle flirtation takes place and she kisses Walker three times, becoming somewhat infatuated.

The following morning, Walker directs Shaw to go to the nearby highway and hitchhike after he lifts off.

The helicopter chase resumes; meanwhile, McAndrew and a police pilot in a Piper Arrow, alerted by the airline pilot, approach the area as well. The two helicopters fly to an abandoned airfield, where the bank employee said the robbers have a getaway plane and pilot to fly them to Mexico. The police aircraft arrives and McAndrew runs to the hangar where Walker has cornered the bandit's helicopter inside, with Walker tossing the money out to McAndrew. Walker then rams his helicopter into the bandit's aircraft to save his buddy. The police pilot runs over and McAndrew says that they are going after the pilot of the getaway plane, who has just fled in a Cessna 206 after seeing the crash.

== Cast ==
- David Janssen as Harry Walker
- Ralph Meeker as McAndrew (although Walker calls him McAndrews in dialogue)
- Elayne Heilveil as Teresa Janice "T.J." Shaw
- Harry Klekas as Police Captain
- Sam Dawson as Police Dispatcher
- Don Wilbanks as Trucker
- James Gavin as Police Pilot

== Production ==
Birds of Prey was filmed in Salt Lake City, Utah, with final scenes shot at the recently closed Wendover Air Force Base, where the 509th Composite Group prepared for their atomic bomb missions in World War II with their Silverplate Boeing B-29 Superfortresses. Parts of the film were also shot in Canyonlands and Sevenmile Canyon in Utah. In one technically challenging scene, two helicopters flew within feet of each other inside a hangar, a feat that pilots and aeronautical engineers considered so dangerous that it had not been tried before.
