= Night Visitor =

- Theatrical release poster
- Directed by: Rupert Hitzig
- Written by: Randal Viscovich
- Produced by: Alain Silver
- Starring: Richard Roundtree; Elliott Gould; Shannon Tweed; Michael J. Pollard; Derek Rydall; Allen Garfield
- Cinematography: Peter C. Jensen
- Edited by: Glenn Erickson
- Music by: Parmer Fuller
- Production companies: United Artists; Premiere Pictures Corporation
- Distributed by: MGM/UA Communications Co.
- Release date: 1989
- Running time: 93 minutes
- Country: United States
- Language: English

Night Visitor (produced under the title Never Cry Devil) is a 1989 American horror film directed by Rupert Hitzig, produced by Alain Silver, and starring Richard Roundtree, Elliott Gould, Allen Garfield, and Derek Rydall.

== Plot ==
High school student Billy Colton (Derek Rydall) is spying on his attractive new neighbor (Shannon Tweed) when he witnesses her being murdered by a man in a robe, and he recognizes the man as his unpopular history teacher Zachary Willard (Allen Garfield). Because he has a history of pranks and conflict with Willard, the police do not believe him. Threatened by Willard and his deranged brother Stanley (Michael J. Pollard), who are cultists and serial murderers, Billy convinces retired investigator Ronald 'Ron' Devereaux (Elliott Gould) to help him find hard evidence.

== Cast ==
- Richard Roundtree as Captain Crane
- Elliott Gould as Ronald "Ron" Devereaux
- Michael J. Pollard as Stanley Willard
- Allen Garfield as Zachary Willard
- Derek Rydall as Billy Colton
- Henry Gibson as Jake
- Shannon Tweed as Lisa Grace
- Bruce Kimmel as Townsend
- Brooke Bundy as Mrs. Colton
- Kathleen Bailey as Dolan
- Scott Fults as Sam Loomis
- Teresa Vander Woude as Kelly Fremont
- Michael Jason Rosen as Bernstein (credited as Michael Rosen)
- Jovanni Brascia as Tony
- Alain Silver as Thornhill (credited as Alain Joel Silver)
- Amy Waddell as Annie Hayworth
- Ann Dane as Theresa
- Nancy McLendon as Reporter
- Teri Weigel as Victim In Cellar
- Kathryn Kimler as Second Victim

== Reception ==
The movie was briefly released by MGM/UA on 200 screens (none of which were in New York or Los Angeles) and garnered mixed reviews, many of which expressed humorous appreciation for a basement confrontation between Gould's Devereaux and Pollard's Stanley, while others disparaged the sequence as "a badly choreographed fight between a chainsaw wielding Pollard and a shotgun toting Gould that probably read really well in the script, but looks terrible on film." A later reviewer was more favorably disposed: "Combine Rear Window with late 80s Satanic conspiracy theories and this is the result. Not as bad as it sounds, Night Visitor is an unfairly obscure movie about Satanism in suburbia."
