= The Most Interesting Man in the World =

Advertising campaign for Dos Equis beer

The Most Interesting Man in The World
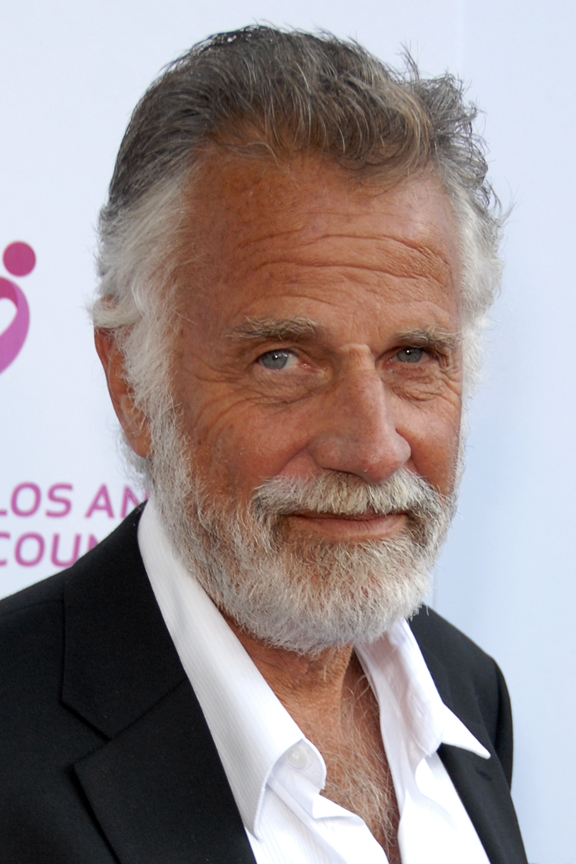
- Goldsmith played the Most Interesting Man in the World from 2006 to 2016
- First appearance: 2006
- Portrayed by: Jonathan Goldsmith (2006–2016, 2026–); Claudio Marangone (young); Augustin Legrand (2016–2018)
- Company: Cuauhtémoc Moctezuma Brewery

In-universe information
- Alias: The World's Most Interesting Man

The Most Interesting Man in the World is an advertising campaign for Dos Equis beer featuring actor Jonathan Goldsmith as a bearded, debonair older gentleman with voiceovers that were both humorous and outrageous. The advertisements began appearing in the United States in 2006 and became a popular Internet meme. The original campaign ended in 2018. In January 2026, Dos Equis announced it would be reviving the campaign.

== History ==
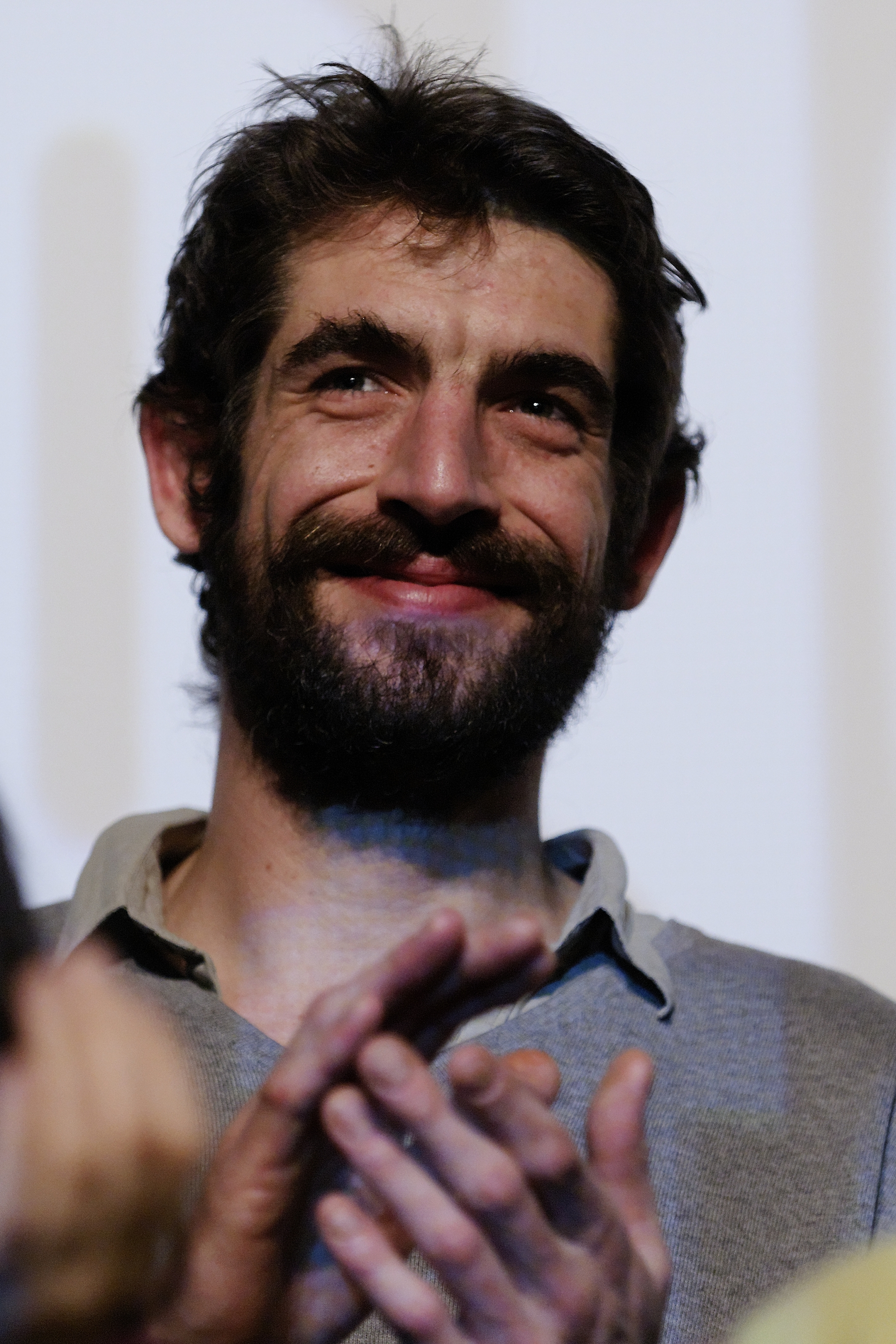
Augustin Legrand replaced Goldsmith in 2016

The advertisements began appearing in the United States in 2006, with The Most Interesting Man in the World portrayed by American actor Jonathan Goldsmith, and Frontline narrator Will Lyman providing voiceovers. They were produced by the marketing firm Euro RSCG (now Havas Worldwide) for Cuauhtémoc Moctezuma Brewery.

Goldsmith landed the Dos Equis gig by auditioning for the role. Auditioners were given the ending line "...and that's how I arm wrestled Fidel Castro" and asked to improvise. Goldsmith began his audition by removing one sock and then improvised for 30 minutes before reaching the concluding line. The actor says his characterization was inspired by his late friend and sailing partner Fernando Lamas.

In March 2016, Dos Equis announced Goldsmith's retirement from the role. His last commercial saw him take a one-way journey to Mars amid much acclaim, and the narration: "His only regret is not knowing what regret feels like". In September, French actor Augustin Legrand made his debut as Goldsmith's replacement.

The original campaign ended in 2018, and it was replaced with a campaign called "Keep It Interesante". In January 2026, Dos Equis announced amid declining beverage sales that the campaign would be revived, with Goldsmith returning as "the most interesting man." The first commercial of the new campaign aired January 19, 2026, on ESPN during the 2026 College Football Playoff National Championship broadcast.

== Advertisements ==
The Goldsmith advertisements feature an older bearded, debonair gentleman. They also feature a montage (mostly in black and white) of daring exploits involving "the most interesting man" when he was younger, in which the character is played by actor Claudio Marangone.

The precise settings are never revealed, but he performs incredible feats such as freeing an angry bear from a bear trap, performing a break shot in pool by shooting the cue ball out of the mouth of a man lying on the pool table, stitching up his own shoulder in a field hospital while flirting with the nurses, handfeeding a nest of egrets while ascending a cliff face, surfing a rogue wave, and bench pressing two young women, each seated in a chair. The voiceovers themselves are intended to be both humorous and outrageous, including giving his own father "the talk", experiencing an awkward moment just to know how it felt, and finding the Fountain of Youth but not drinking from it because he wasn't thirsty. Other feats are more centered on his physical abilities and personality. These include changing foreign policy through his small talk, slamming a revolving door, and parallel-parking a train.

At the end of the advertisement, the Most Interesting Man, usually shown sitting in a night club or other social setting surrounded by several beautiful young women, says, "I don't always drink beer. But when I do, I prefer Dos Equis." Each commercial ends with him stating the signature sign-off: "Stay thirsty, my friends."

There are secondary advertisements that are similar to the final part of the original advertisements. They feature the Man sitting in a social setting, surrounded by beautiful young women, conveying a short opinion to the viewer on certain subjects, such as bar nuts, the two-party system, self-defense, trophy wives, and "bromance". He then finishes the advertisement by holding a Dos Equis beer and saying, "Stay thirsty, my friends."

The advertisements featuring Legrand end with a slightly different sign-off: "Stay thirsty, mis amigos" (Spanish for "my friends").

== Sales strategy and results ==
The agency's rationale for the brand strategy was defined as: "He is a man rich in stories and experiences, much the way the audience hopes to be in the future. Rather than an embodiment of the brand, The Most Interesting Man is a voluntary brand spokesperson: he and Dos Equis share a point of view on life that it should be lived interestingly." According to the company, sales in the United States increased each year between 2006 and 2010 and tripled in Canada in 2008, although exact figures were not provided. Sales of Dos Equis are said to have increased by 22% at a time when sale of other imported beer fell 4% in the U.S.

Goldsmith said in an interview that he realized how successful the campaign had been when a man came up to him in a restaurant, telling him that he had asked his young son what he wanted to be when he grew up, and the son replied: "I want to be The Most Interesting Man In The World." Goldsmith also said he had been approached on the street because of his role by such figures as Michael Jordan, Leonardo DiCaprio and Jennifer Lawrence, and was invited to meet Barack Obama, the former US President, on several occasions.

== In popular culture ==
The Most Interesting Man in the World has become an Internet meme, with a picture of The Most Interesting Man accompanying the phrasal template "I don't always [X], but when I do, [Y]".

On the September 22, 2012 airing of Saturday Night Live, guest host Joseph Gordon-Levitt played the unimpressive son of The Most Interesting Man in the World in a pair of sketches, with Jason Sudeikis appearing as his father in the second.

Goldsmith briefly reprised his role as The Most Interesting Man in the World during an advertisement for Stella Artois. The commercial was first aired on February 4, 2019 during Super Bowl LIII.

Goldsmith also reprised the character in a series of commercials for Astral Tequila in 2019. In these commercials, Goldsmith's character is informed by his young assistant that he has won some sort of argument or competition. Goldsmith's character is usually interrupted while finishing some incredible task in his office. Upon hearing the good news, Goldsmith's character then drops what he is doing, saying, "This calls for tequila." His young assistant adds, "The best tequila." Goldsmith's character sets down the bottle of tequila and looks at the camera, saying "Astral Tequila."

In December 2023, Goldsmith reprised the character again in an advertisement for a cryptocurrency firm. "You know what's interesting these days? Bitcoin," he says.

== Examples ==
- He once cheated death, and death didn't mind
- If opportunity knocks, and he's not home, opportunity waits
- If he were to pat you on the back, you would list it on your resume.
- Mosquitoes refuse to bite him purely out of respect.
- If he were to mispronounce your name, you would feel compelled to change it.
- His two cents is worth $37 in change.
- Once, a rattlesnake bit him. After five days of excruciating pain, the snake finally died.
- When he has a 50/50 shot, the odds are 80/20 in his favor.
- He has won the lifetime achievement award, twice.
- His words carry weight that would break a less interesting man's jaw.
- His phone is addicted to him.

== See also ==
- Chuck Norris facts
- Bill Brasky
