= The Stranger Beside Me (film) =

- Genre: Drama
- Written by: Bruce Miller
- Directed by: Sandor Stern
- Starring: Tiffani Amber Thiessen; Eric Close; Gerald McRaney
- Theme music composer: David Mansfield
- Country of origin: United States
- Original language: English

Production
- Executive producers: Ronnie D. Clemmer; Richard P. Kughn; Bill Pace
- Producer: William Shippey
- Production location: San Diego
- Cinematography: Ronald M. Lautore
- Editor: David Campling
- Running time: 120 minutes
- Production companies: Longbow Productions; RHI Entertainment

Original release
- Network: ABC
- Release: September 17, 1995

The Stranger Beside Me is a 1995 American made-for-television drama film directed by Sandor Stern and starring Tiffani Amber Thiessen as a young newlywed who suspects her charming husband (Eric Close) is not as charming or innocent as he seems. Though the film shares a title with a book about Ted Bundy (and the book's 2003 film adaptation), it is not based on that book nor inspired by the serial killer.

== Tagline ==
"It's what you don't know that can kill you."

== Plot ==
Jennifer Morgan is a young painter, who has secluded herself from the world since being raped two years earlier. At a family party, she meets Chris Gallagher, who falls in love with her. She is reluctant to be intimate with him, but he convinces her to marry him, and she hopes to let go of her traumatic past. Shortly after the ceremony, Chris' 17-year-old cousin Dana warns Jennifer that she will not be happy with him, but Jennifer does not listen. Because Chris has recently joined the Navy, Jennifer agrees to move with him to the seaside, where she befriends Nancy Halloran.

Shortly after, Gina Corbet, a neighbor, becomes the victim of a peeping tom, and is later raped by a masked man. Most of the women in the neighborhood leave in panic, but Chris dismisses the danger and convinces Jennifer that they are overreacting. Meanwhile, Chris' dark side is starting to emerge, and he becomes more violent, and possessive. Jennifer finds out that Chris has been released from his Navy duty after threatening to kill himself. When she confronts him, he accuses her of being a spy. The same night, he is arrested for voyeurism. Chris pleads guilty to the charges, and agrees to a discharge from the Navy.

Jennifer is devastated by this news, since she recently found out that she is pregnant. Regardless, she gives Chris another chance. They move back to their previous home, and for a while things take a turn for the better. Chris' temper soon returns, while a masked rapist, once again begins preying on women in the neighborhood. Following the birth of Jennifer's daughter, Dana tells Jennifer that Chris molested her when she was a child. Jennifer starts to suspect his involvement in the rapes. She talks to a detective from California, who tells her that he had all the evidence but could not do anything because Chris was under the protection of a district attorney friend. Horrified at learning all of this, Jennifer decides to leave Chris.

Chris, however, is unwilling to let her go, and he becomes abusive. Jennifer is rescued by two police officers led by Officer Kurtz, and presses charges against Chris. She drops the charges a few days later, when Chris convinces her that he will not be convicted, and threatens to find her and harm her if she runs away. She befriends Officer Kurtz, who is convinced of Chris's guilt as the rapist and a domestic abuser, but is unable to take actions against him without proof. While posing as Chris's loving wife, Jennifer tries to collect evidence against him. She finds his weapons in his car, but by the time the police arrive, they have disappeared. After this happens, Chris becomes increasingly violent.

One night, Jennifer follows Chris, when he suddenly leaves at a late hour. She catches him preparing to rape someone, and sabotages his car, and Jennifer warns Officer Kurtz. The police arrive in time to prevent the rape, and Chris' attempt to escape fails, leading to his arrest. He pleads guilty to four counts of aggravated sexual assault, and one count of sexual attempted assault, and is sentenced to 99 years in prison. Jennifer and her daughter continue to live in the Southwestern United States.

== Cast ==
- Tiffani Amber Thiessen as Jennifer Gallagher
- Eric Close as Chris Gallagher
- Steven Eckholdt as Detective Bill Rounder
- Gerald McRaney as Dave Morgan
- Alyson Hannigan as Dana
- Casey Sander as Officer Kurtz
- Lorrie Morgan as Nancy Halloran
- Patrick Labyorteaux as Police Officer Lane
- Suzanne Ventulett as Kim
