= Body Count (1986 film) =

1986 film by Ruggero Deodato

- Directed by: Ruggero Deodato
- Screenplay by: Alessandro Capone; Dardano Sacchetti; Luca D'Alisera
- Story by: Alessandro Capone
- Starring: Bruce Penhall; Mimsy Farmer; David Hess; Charles Napier
- Cinematography: Emilio Loffredo
- Edited by: Mario Morra
- Music by: Claudio Simonetti
- Production company: Racing Pictures
- Distributed by: Titanus
- Release dates: 1986; 15 May 1987 (Italy)
- Country: Italy

Body Count (Italian: Camping del terrore, lit. Camping of Terror) is a 1986 Italian slasher film directed by Ruggero Deodato. The film is about a group of vacationing teenagers who enter an abandoned camp site that was formerly an Indian burial ground. One by one, they begin to be killed off.

The film was initially to be made by Alessandro Capone, but directing was taken over by Deodato during production. The film's script was changed on set by screenwriter Dardano Sacchetti while production was troubled by weather in the Abruzzi region. Retrospective reviews of the film have commented that it was derivative of American slasher films of the era.

== Plot ==
A gang of vacationing teenagers drive out to an abandoned campsite that was shut down years before, due to the murder of a young couple that occurred there. The area was formerly an old Indian burial ground and is believed to be haunted by the spirit of an Indian shaman. One by one, the kids are killed off in gruesome ways. They believe the killer to be the Indian shaman returned to life. The killer offs most of the teens, who hole up in the owners' cabin for safety. The killer breaks in but is fought off and shot by the arriving sheriff. The killer is revealed to be the owners' son, who witnessed the murders years ago. The terror is thought to be over, but the camp owner is murdered by the real shaman with an ax.

== Cast ==
- Bruce Penhall as Dave Calloway
- Mimsy Farmer as Julia Ritchie
- David Hess as Robert Ritchie
- Luisa Maneri as Carol
- Nicola Farron as Ben Ritchie
- Andrew J. Lederer as Sidney Sears
- Stefano Madia as Tony
- John Steiner as Dr. Olsen
- Nancy Brilli as Tracy
- Cynthia Thompson as Cissy
- Valentina Forte as Pamela Hicks
- Ivan Rassimov as Deputy Sheriff Ted Barnes
- Elena Pompei as Sharon
- Charles Napier as Sheriff Charlie

== Production ==
The film was shot in the Italian Abruzzi region for four weeks. Director Ruggero Deodato entered the film's production to take over for Alessandro Capone who had written the film's script. Dardano Sacchetti also entered to do re-writes for the film during production. The film was plagued by a bad production, due to the bad weather in the Abruzzo region.

== Release ==
Body Count was first released in 1986 and then released in Italy on May 15, 1987. Film critic and historian Roberto Curti stated that the Italian theatrical release was very brief. The film was released on home video in Australia, Holland and the United Kingdom as Body Count. In Denmark, it was released on home video as Shamen.

== Critical reception ==
From retrospective reviews, Adrian Luther Smith in his book on Italian giallo found that the film had a "great cast of Italian exploitation regulars to go waste in a cynical production which should never have been made." Luther Smith stated that the film score by Claudio Simonetti was "the one feature of the film everyone seems to applaud." A review from the online film database Allmovie called it a "derivative slasher entry" and "one of Deodato's least interesting films."

Deodato later spoke about the film, stating that "It's not bad. But perhaps it was more suited for a director like [Lamberto] Bava or Fulci."
