= Eric Close =

American actor and director (b.1967)

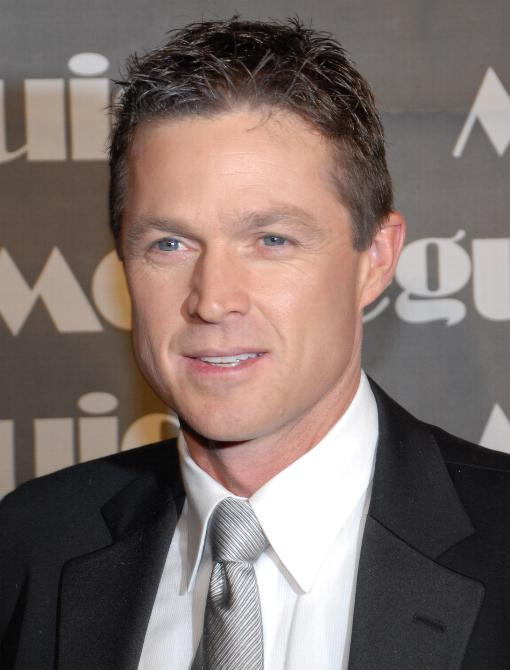
- Close at the 16th Annual MovieGuide Faith and Values Awards in 2008
- Born: Staten Island, New York, United States
- Education: University of Southern California (BA)
- Occupation: Actor
- Years active: 1991–present
- Spouse: Keri Close (m. 1995)
- Children: 2

Eric Close (24 May 1967) is an American actor, best known for his roles in television series, particularly as FBI agent Martin Fitzgerald in the CBS mystery drama Without a Trace (2002–2009), Michael Wiseman in the CBS sci-fi drama Now and Again (1999-2000), Teddy Conrad in the ABC musical drama Nashville (2012–2017), and Travis Tanner in Suits (2011–2015).

== Early life ==
Close was born in Fort Wadsworth, Staten Island, New York. His father is an orthopedic surgeon. He is the eldest of three brothers. His family moved to Indiana and then to Michigan, and finally settled in San Diego when he was seven years old.

Close was a member of the Sigma Chi fraternity and graduated with a B.A. in communications from the University of Southern California in 1989.

== Career ==
Close was interested in acting from an early age and had some stage experience in school, but did not decide to pursue an acting career until after college. His first role was in a theater production Rat Songs in L.A., after which he was offered parts in the crime drama American Me (1992) and the TV movie Safe House directed by Elena Mannus. He had a brief stint in daytime television when he played Sawyer Walker on the NBC daytime soap opera Santa Barbara from 1992 to 1993. He received a Soap Opera Digest Award nomination for Outstanding Male Newcomer for his role as Sawyer Walker on Santa Barbara. Close later starred on short-lived primetime shows such as McKenna (1994–1995), Dark Skies (1996–1997), The Magnificent Seven (1998–1999), Now and Again (1999–2000), and the Steven Spielberg miniseries production, Taken (2002). He starred on storyline online and read When Pigasso met Mootisse.

Close is best known for his role as Federal Bureau of Investigation agent Martin Fitzgerald on the CBS mystery drama Without a Trace. The show ran for seven seasons from September 26, 2002, to May 19, 2009. From 2011 to 2015, Close had a recurring role as Travis Tanner in the USA legal drama Suits, and starred as Michael Dorset in the short-lived CBS comedy-drama Chaos. In 2012, Close began co-starring with Connie Britton in the ABC musical drama Nashville as Teddy Conrad, initially the husband of country singer Rayna Jaymes (Britton) and later the mayor of Nashville.

== Filmography ==
=== Film ===
Year	Title	Role	Notes
1991	Keeping Secrets	Young Michael (uncredited)	Television movie
1992	American Me	Juvie Hall Attacker	
1993	Taking Liberty	Adam	
1994	Hercules and the Lost Kingdom	Telamon	Television movie
1994	Without Consent	David Mills	Television movie
1995	Long Island Fever	Scott Parks	Television movie
1995	The Stranger Beside Me	Chris Gallagher	Television movie
2001	Follow the Stars Home	Mark McCune	Television movie
2001	Liberty, Maine	Unknown	
2001	The Sky Is Falling	Mike	
2003	Alvarez & Cruz	Charlie	
2004	NTSB: The Crash of Flight 323	N'Tom Price	Television movie
2007	Saving Angelo	Dad	Short film
2010	Unanswered Prayers	Ben Beck	Television movie
2014	American Sniper	DIA Agent Snead	
2017	Christmas Crime Story	Randal Edwards	
2017	Christmas in the Air	Robert Trent	Television movie
2018	Indivisible	Ltc. Jacobsen	
2018	Legal Action	Casey McKay	
2022	The Mulligan	Paul McAllister	
2024	Average Joe	Joe Kennedy	Post-Production

=== Television ===
Year	Title	Role	Notes
1991	MacGyver	Guard	Episode: "The Prometheus Syndrome"
1992	Major Dad	Jim	Episode: "The 'L' Word"
1992–93	Santa Barbara	Sawyer Walker	25 episodes
1994–95	McKenna	Brick McKenna	13 episodes (5 aired)
1995–96	Sisters	William 'Billy' Griffin	12 episodes
1996–1997	Dark Skies	John Loengard	19 episodes Nominated—Saturn Award for Best Actor on Television
1998–2000	The Magnificent Seven	Vin Tanner	22 episodes
1999–2000	Now and Again	Michael Wiseman	22 episodes Nominated—Saturn Award for Best Actor on Television
2002	Taken	John	4 episodes
2002–09	Without a Trace	Martin Fitzgerald	160 episodes Nominated—Screen Actors Guild Award for Outstanding Performance by an Ensemble in a Drama Series
2005	Kim Possible	Crash Cranston (voice)	Episode: "Team Impossible"
2010	Seven Deadly Sins	Jack Powell	2 episodes
2010	Criminal Minds	Det. Matt Spicer	Episode: "Our Darkest Hour"
2011	Chaos	Michael Dorset	13 episodes
2011–15	Suits	Travis Tanner	6 episodes
2011	American Horror Story: Murder House	Hugo Langdon	2 episodes
2012	Law & Order: Special Victims Unit	Colin Barnes	Episode: "Father Dearest"
2012–18	Nashville	Teddy Conrad	65 episodes; Main Role (Seasons 1–3), Guest (Seasons 4–6)
2019	A Christmas Love Story	Shane	Hallmark Movie; Also director
2019	Angel Falls: A Novel Holiday	Anthony	Hallmark Movie
