= Robert Sigl =

German film director and writer (born 1962)

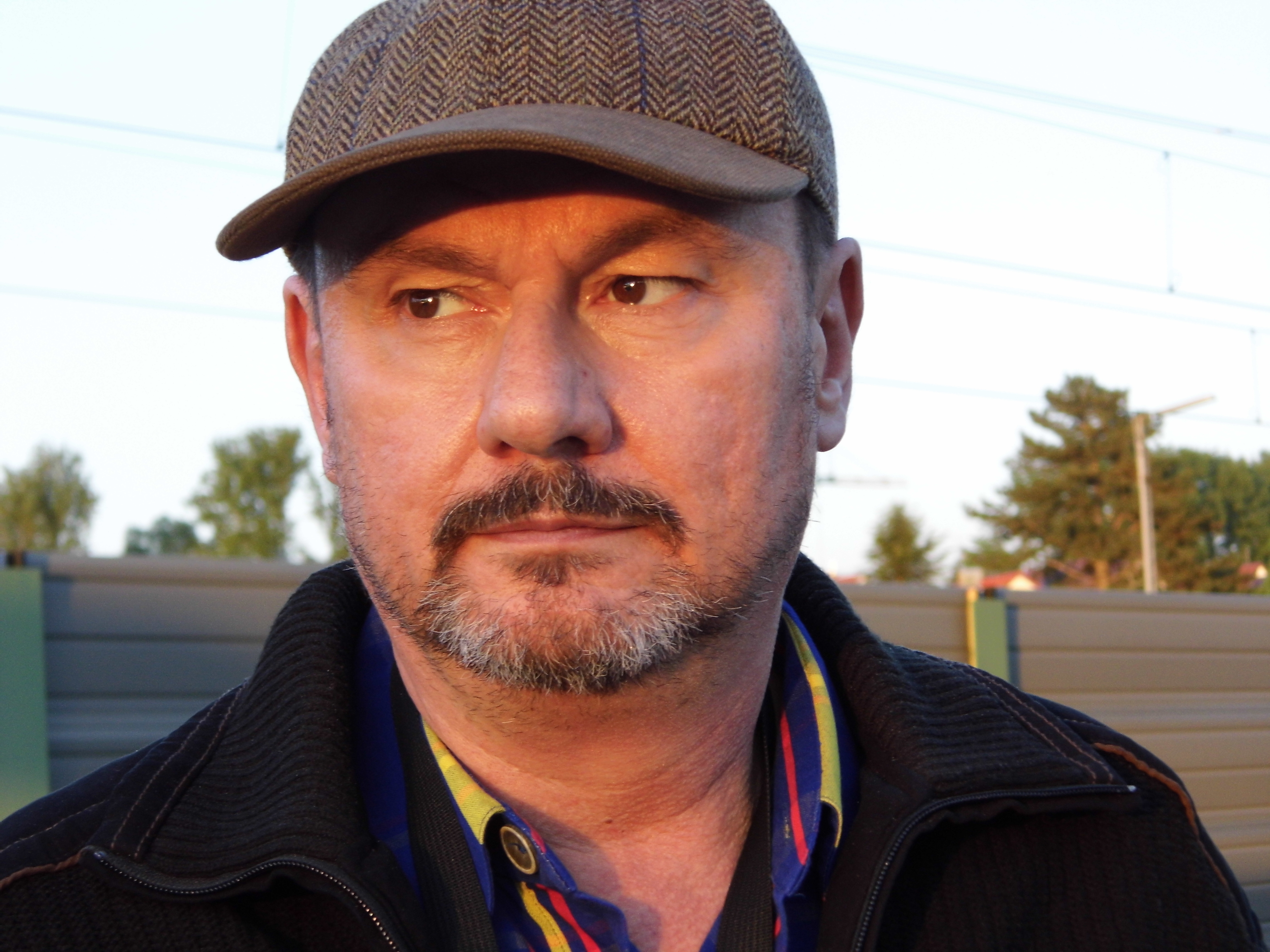
Robert Sigl

Robert Sigl (born 11 July 1962) is a German film director and writer. He attended the University of Television and Film Munich from 1981-1986. His short film The Christmas Tree (German: Der Weihnachtsbaum) was shown at international festivals in Madrid and Berlin. In 1987 he started preparations for his first full-length motion picture Laurin in Hungary, which he also scripted.

Laurin was awarded the Bavarian Film Awards for best direction of a newcomer. At the age of 25, Sigl was the youngest director ever to receive this distinction. Laurin was shown at numerous international festivals, including Moscow and Málaga, and was released in Great Britain by the UK video label Eureka Entertainment and in Spain by Filmax. It is currently airing on Canada's Scream TV and is available in the US on an import DVD from Luminous Film and Video.

Over the following years Sigl worked on several projects and screenplays before shooting the acclaimed miniseries Stella Stellaris in Poland, a fairy-tale-like fantasy/comedy/adventure. He directed the episode The Lost Daughter for the popular action series Alarm for Cobra 11 - Die Autobahnpolizei.

Both Laurin and Stella Stellaris left an impression with Canadian producer Paul Donovan and the executives of US cable channel Showtime. Sigl was commissioned to direct one of the four pilot movies, Giga Shadow, for the international Science-Fiction-Miniseries Lexx. Giga Shadow featured Malcolm McDowell and a large amount of computer-generated effects. Lexx was sold into more than one hundred countries. For the third season of Lexx Sigl returned to direct the episode K-Town.

He directed the German horror-thriller School's Out (German title: Schrei - denn werde ich dich töten!) which became one of the most successful TV movies of 1999. Fangoria/MTI subsequently released it in the US on DVD and home video. Due to School's Out's success Sigl was commissioned to direct the sequel The Island of Fear aka: Dead Island: School's Out 2 (German title: Das Mädcheninternat – Deine Schreie wird niemand hören) in Brittany.

Sigl managed several episodes of the German crime series Der Ermittler and Tatort. He is currently working on projects for the big screen, including The Spider, Medusa, The Blind Room, A Study in Red Trilogy, DragonMan: The Adventures of Luke Starr, Jack the Ripper: Reality and Myth (TV Movie), The Blind Room, Wurdilak, and The 13th Disciple.
