= Rupert Hitzig =

American actor

- Born: August 15, 1938 (age 87)
- Occupations: Director, producer, actor and screenwriter

Rupert Hitzig (born August 15, 1938) is an American director, producer, actor and screenwriter. He graduated from Harvard University.

== Career ==
With executive producer Berry Gordy he produced The Last Dragon (1985), directed by Michael Schultz and written by Louis Venosta. With Robert Boris he wrote the screenplay for Electra Glide in Blue (1973), directed by James William Guercio and starring Robert Blake, Billy Green Bush and Mitchell Ryan. With Alan Landsburg he produced Jaws 3-D (1983), directed by Joe Alves and James Contner as director of photography.

He was looking to direct his first film for under a million of dollars. Chris Black grabbed a copy of The Boy Who Cried Devil and passed it along. Thanks to Black, Richard Corey, Scott Hill and Hitzig, started Night Visitor (1989).

== Filmography ==
Year	Title	Director	Assistant director	Producer	Writer	Actor
TBA	The Curse of Hezekiah	✓				
TBA	Stuff It	✓		✓	✓	
2009	Dialogues					✓
2006	Four Weeks in May	✓		✓	✓	
2006	T.E.A.M.W.O.R.K.	✓		✓	✓	
2003	Static			✓		
2003	Box Time: Playhouse	✓				
2002	NASCAR Victory Lane: All Access			✓		
1998	Nowhere Land	✓				
1994	Outlaws: The Legend of O.B. Taggart	✓				
1993	Real Stories of the Highway Patrol	✓				
1990	Backstreet Dreams	✓				✓
1989	Night Visitor	✓				
1987	The Squeeze			✓		
1985	The Last Dragon		✓	✓		
1983	Jaws 3-D		✓	✓		
1981	Wolfen		✓	✓		
1981	Cattle Annie and Little Britches			✓		
1980	Thanksgiving Special			✓		
1980	Happy Birthday, Gemini			✓		
1979	Third Annual Final Warning!!			✓		
1978	How to Pick Up Girls!			✓		
1978	Second Final Warning			✓		
1977	Final Warning			✓		
1976	Ivan the Terrible			✓		
1976	Return to Earth			✓		
1976	The Second Annual Comedy Awards			✓		
1975	Saturday Night Live with Howard Cosell			✓		
1974	Energy Crisis			✓		
1973	Electra Glide in Blue			✓	✓	
1973	Much Ado About Nothing			✓		
1973	Birds of Prey				✓	
1970	NBC Children's Theatre			✓		
