= Alessandro Capone (director) =

Italian film director

- Born: 25 July 1955 (age 70); Rome, Italy
- Occupations: Film director, screenwriter
- Years active: 1979-present

Alessandro Capone (born 25 July 1955) is an Italian film director and screenwriter. He has directed 15 films since 1989.

== Selected filmography ==
- Body Count (1987 film) (1987, writer)
- Witch Story (Le Streghe) (1989, writer/ director)
- Les secrets professionnels du Dr Apfelglück (1991, director)
- Hidden Love (2007)
- I delitti del cuoco (2010)
- 2047 Sights of Death (2014)
