= Phantom of the Mall: Eric's Revenge =

- Theatrical release poster
- Directed by: Richard Friedman
- Screenplay by: Scott J. Schneid; Tony Michelman; Robert King
- Story by: Scott J. Schneid; Frederick R. Ulrich
- Produced by: Thomas Fries; Robert J. Koster; Paul Little
- Starring: Derek Rydall; Jonathan Goldsmith; Rob Estes; Pauly Shore; Kari Whitman; Morgan Fairchild
- Cinematography: Harry Mathias
- Edited by: Gregory F. Plotts; Amy Tompkins
- Music by: Stacy Widelitz
- Distributed by: Fries Distribution Company
- Release dates: September 22, 1989 (Detroit, Michigan); December 1, 1989 (Los Angeles)
- Running time: 91 minutes
- Country: United States
- Language: English
- Budget: $2 million

Phantom of the Mall: Eric's Revenge is a 1989 American slasher film directed by Richard Friedman, and starring Derek Rydall, Jonathan Goldsmith, Rob Estes, Pauly Shore, Kari Whitman, Ken Foree, and Morgan Fairchild. It follows a young man who apparently dies in a suspicious house fire after saving his girlfriend, Melody. A year later, at the new mall built over the site of the burned-out house, thefts and murders begin to occur as a mysterious figure secretly prowls around the shopping center and takes a keen interest in watching over and protecting Melody.

== Plot ==
A figure steals clothes and a crossbow. A guard catches the figure in the act, and he stabs the guard with an arrow. Melody and her friend Susie get jobs at the mall. Eric sees Melody from points around the mall, and leaves flowers and gifts for her. He breaks open a head to fashion a half-mask. Eric kills a worker by forcing his head into a fan. Eric attacks anyone who threatens Melody. He kills a guard, who spies on women in the room via video, by crushing him into an panel using a forklift. A mugger attacks Melody in the lot, but Eric shoots him with the crossbow. The mugger is revealed to be the pianist. Eric kills him on the toilet with a snake. The mall owner's son harasses Melody's friend Susie. Eric kills him with a lasso pulled into the escalator. Reporter Peter Baldwin becomes interested in Melody and tries to learn if Eric is still alive. Eric Matthews' house was destroyed in a fire which trapped and killed him. Eric plants a bomb beneath the mall.

Guard Christopher Volker attacks Melody and Peter at gunpoint as they talk about the fire. He boasts that he is the arsonist. Eric leaps onto the roof. Volker attacks Melody again. Eric fights him, then kills him using the crusher, and carries Melody to his lair.

Buzz tricks a guard away from the booth so he and Susie can search for Melody. Melody awakens, and talks with Eric. She is glad he is alive, but confesses she does not love him anymore. He declares that he has planted the bomb, so she will die and be with him forever anyway.

Eric deploys the snake to kill Peter. Eric tries to fight and kill him, but Eric is stunned by Melody's shout that she loves Peter. Peter takes the chance to knock Eric out, so the pair escape and can warn Buzz and Susie of the bomb. Eric revives and kills those involved in the arson and the construction of the mall. Owner Harv Posner and the Mayor Karen Wilton. Melody and all of the patrons escape, as Eric's bomb explodes.

== Cast ==
- Derek Rydall as Eric Matthews, The Phantom of the Mall
- Jonathan Goldsmith as Harv Posner, Mall Owner
- Rob Estes as Peter Baldwin, Reporter
- Pauly Shore as Buzz, Yogurt Clerk
- Kimber Sissons as Susie, Fashion Clerk
- Gregory Scott Cummins as Christopher Volker, Security Guard
- Tom Fridley as Justin, Posner's Son
- Kari Whitman as Melody Austin
- Ken Foree as Acardi
- Morgan Fairchild as Mayor Karen Wilton
- Terrence Evans as Security Guard
- Kelly Rutherford as Salesgirl
- Dante D'Andre as Piano Man

== Production ==
The film was shot in southern California at Sherman Oaks Galleria, Promenade Mall (now Westfield Promenade) and Valencia Studios, "an old warehouse converted for the film." Alhambra, California was also a location shoot.

== Release ==
The film was released theatrically in Detroit, Michigan on September 22, 1989, and in Los Angeles on December 1, 1989.

=== Critical response ===
The Los Angeles Times was bluntly negative in its assessment of the film, comparing it with other Phantom of the Opera film adaptations: "this schlock-slasher version of Leroux's shocker—with the Phantom turned into a burned, vengeful teen prowling the air-tunnels of a posh suburban shopping mall—is, hands down, the most inept, pointless, puerile and inane." The review continued: "scarcely a scene isn't gross or ridiculous, scarcely a performance isn't forced or shallow, scarcely a line of dialogue isn't a burbling, awkward cliche. There's a perfection of awfulness here that almost commands respect; it can't have been easy to keep going on this picture after a look or two at the rushes."

Charles Tatum of Australian review site EFilmCritic.com gave the film one star (of four), "Worse than Montezuma's Revenge", writing "You probably did not need a plot sketch since the entire story is in the title. Someone named Eric is taking revenge against people as a phantom of a mall. This also means there is no suspense. We know Eric is behind this, but we still have to see Estes and Cute Girl go through the motions of a silly investigation."

In his "Final Verdict," Andrew Smith of UK review site PopcornPictures.co.uk gave the film one star, stating "You should know the 80s slasher drill by now. No scares, suspense, story, acting or characters—just novelty death scenes and a psychotic villain. When a film fails to deliver on the latter two AND the rest, then it's really bottom-of-the-barrel stuff."

=== Home media ===
It was made available on video by Fries Entertainment in February 1990. A DVD edition was released by Echo Bridge Home Entertainment in 2006. On November 23, 2021, Arrow Films issued a limited edition Blu-ray in the United States and United Kingdom featuring four versions of the film: the original theatrical cut, a truncated television cut, a composite cut and a secret cut under the Special Features known as the Subterranean Cut. This can be accessed by pushing right on your Blu-Ray player remote when Alternate and Deleted Scenes is highlighted under the Special Features category.
