= Laurin (film) =

- Theatrical release poster
- Directed by: Robert Sigl
- Screenplay by: Ádám Rozgonyi; Robert Sigl
- Produced by: Andreas Bareiss; Bernie Stampfer
- Starring: Dóra Szinetár; Brigitte Karner; Károly Eperjes
- Cinematography: Nyika Jancsó
- Edited by: Teri Losonci
- Production companies: Dialóg Filmstúdió; Salinas Filmproduktion; Südwestfunk; TS-Film
- Distributed by: Cine International
- Release date: 30 November 1989 (West Germany)
- Running time: 84 minutes
- Countries: West Germany; Hungary
- Language: German

Laurin is a 1989 horror film directed by Robert Sigl in his directorial debut, and starring Dóra Szinetár, Brigitte Karner, and Károly Eperjes. Set in 1901 in a small German village, the film focuses on a series of missing children cases.

== Cast ==
- Dóra Szinetár as Laurin
- Brigitte Karner as Flora Andersen
- Károly Eperjes as Van Rees
- Hédi Temessy as Olga
- Barnabás Tóth as Stefan Berghaus
- Kati Sir as Frau Greta Berghaus
- Endre Kátay as Pastor Van Rees
- János Derzsi as Arne
- Zoltán Gera as Herr Engels
- Ildikó Hámori as Frau Johansson
- Zsolt Szerenyi as Zigeunerjunge

== Sources ==
- Schneider, Steven Jay, ed. (2007). 100 European Horror Films. London, England: British Film Institute. ISBN 978-1-838-71403-1.
