= VidAmerica =

American media company (1979–1992)

VidAmerica, Inc.
- Industry: Home video and software
- Founded: 1979
- Defunct: 1992
- Fate: Defunct
- Headquarters: New York, New York
- Key people: Al Markim
- Products: VHS

VidAmerica was a home video distributor established in 1979 as a subsidiary of Video Corporation of America and headquartered in New York City, New York. It was set up to pioneer the concept of renting videocassettes through mail, which led to failure where each week, tapes kept disappearing somewhere in the postal system, much to the chagrin of VidAmerica executives as they considered stamping the packages a "nuclear waste" before giving up on long-distance retail.

During its lifetime, VidAmerica distributed B-movies, independent films, special interest videos, and public domain titles, as well as films from the RKO Radio Pictures library and select Avco-Embassy Pictures titles, on VHS, and rented most of its tapes on a seven-day basis for $9.95 to $13.95 (subscribers receive six Program Guides a year). It also originally had an exclusive rental contract with United Artists during its second year of existence (1980), as VidAmerica distributed 20 titles from the UA library (e.g. The Great Escape, Some Like It Hot, and Hair) before UA teamed up with Magnetic Video a year later. (Meanwhile, in the United Kingdom, UA also had an exclusive rental contract with another small distributor called Intervision Video for these aforementioned 20 titles before signing a new deal with Warner Home Video in December 1981.) It also distributed a few of Avco Embassy's titles, but the relationship didn't last long.

VidAmerica also offered other video products (such as blank videotapes) and services (such as film-to-tape transfers). According to VidAmerica president Al Markim, the rental market's hottest sellers were then-new movies, sports blockbusters, "and the kind of material you can't see on free TV, like Oh Calcutta!". The company even did offer a few soft-porn adult movies like Emanuelle in Bangkok, despite Markim's insistence that VidAmerica would never market hard-core pornography or X-rated films.

In 1983, VidAmerica signed a pact with Vestron Video, in which Vestron would handle exclusive US distribution, marketing and sales of all releases from the former. These duties for VidAmerica's releases were later handled by Vestron's Lightning Video subsidiary. In 1987, it broke off from Vestron, and launched its own home video distribution banner.

In 1986, the company was purchased by a consortium controlled by billionaire investor Ronald O. Perelman called Compact Video (his holdings also included Revlon, Four Star International, and New World Entertainment). The acquisitions of the company and Four Star were Compact Video's attempts to restructure the debts of Perelman's MacAndrews & Forbes (which owns 40% of Compact), with a combined revenue of $50 million for Compact, Four Star and VidAmerica. Unfortunately, it didn't generate as much as Perelman's other assets since most of Compact's other revenue came from acquiring a drugstore chain, so a few years after that, it had to be liquidated, with VidAmerica being split from the company as an independent again, but still under Perelman's ownership. In 1992, VidAmerica ceased operations, and president Al Markim sold the VidAmerica library of some 150 titles to Sterling Entertainment/United American Video Corporation. The subsidiary VCA Teletronics, meanwhile, merged with Technicolor.
