= Winterbeast =

1992 American horror film directed by Christopher Thies

- DVD cover
- Directed by: Christopher Thies
- Screenplay by: Christopher Thies; Joseph Calabrese
- Story by: Christopher Thies
- Produced by: Mark Frizzell
- Starring: Tim R. Morgan; Mike Magri; Charles Majka; Bob Harlow
- Cinematography: Bob Goodness; Craig B. Mathieson
- Edited by: Mark Frizzell
- Music by: Michael Perilstein
- Production company: Mercury Films International
- Release date: May 8, 1992
- Country: United States
- Language: English

Winterbeast is a 1992 American horror film directed by Christopher Thies. A low-budget production, it has gained retrospective popularity to the point of being considered a cult film.

== Plot ==
The plot revolves around two rangers inquiring about disappearances in a forest of New England (Massachusetts).

== Production ==
Winterbeast is "a collection of scenes that were filmed over the course of most of a decade." It uses both live action filming and stop-motion animation.

== Home video release ==
Vinegar Syndrome released a Blu-ray version in 2021.

== Reception ==
Winterbeast has been called a ’regional disasterpiece’ and characterized as ’messy and scatterbrained in the best possible ways.’ The film has been noted for its numerous continuity errors. Psychotronic Video found the animation "pathetic".

Retrospective reviews praised the film for its originality. Greg Goodwill commented in Screem magazine, "You really can't imagine a better time with a bad film."
