= Oxford Blues =

1984 film by Robert Boris

- Theatrical release poster
- Directed by: Robert Boris
- Written by: Robert Boris
- Based on: A Yank at Oxford; 1938 film by Jack Conway
- Produced by: Elliott Kastner; Cassian Elwes
- Starring: Rob Lowe; Ally Sheedy; Amanda Pays
- Cinematography: John Stanier
- Edited by: Patrick Moore
- Music by: John Du Prez
- Production company: Metro-Goldwyn-Mayer
- Distributed by: MGM/UA Entertainment Co. (United States); 20th Century Fox (United Kingdom)
- Release date: 24 August 1984
- Running time: 97 minutes
- Country: United Kingdom
- Language: English
- Budget: under $1.8 million
- Box office: $8,793,152

Oxford Blues is a 1984 British comedy-drama sports film written and directed by Robert Boris and starring Rob Lowe, Ally Sheedy and Amanda Pays. It is a remake of the 1938 Metro-Goldwyn-Mayer film A Yank at Oxford.

== Plot ==
Nick Di Angelo is working in a Las Vegas casino to earn enough money to pursue the woman of his dreams, Lady Victoria Wingate, to Oxford, England. He believes the only way to win her is to get into Oxford University and join the rowing team. After spending the night with a beautiful older woman, he collects enough money to make the trip and arrives at Oxford in his 1955 Ford Thunderbird, which promptly gets stuck between two walls along a very narrow street. Thus begin Di Angelo's troubles in Britain.

Di Angelo is accepted into Oriel College, a constituent college of the University of Oxford.

The coxswain of the rowing team that Di Angelo joins, Rona, is also an American. Di Angelo quickly finds Lady Victoria but also finds that she is deeply involved with another Oxford rower, Colin Gilchrist Fisher, a member of Christ Church (another college).

Eventually, Di Angelo comes to learn not only the value of friendship and love, but also the importance of keeping promises to teammates and to oneself as well as the importance of thinking beyond oneself.

== Cast ==
- Rob Lowe as Nick Di Angelo
- Amanda Pays as Lady Victoria Wingate
- Julian Sands as Colin Gilchrist Fisher
- Ally Sheedy as Rona Devlin
- Julian Firth as Geordie Nevitts
- Alan Howard as Simon Rutledge
- Gail Strickland as Las Vegas Lady
- Michael Gough as Dr. Ambrose
- Aubrey Morris as Dr. Quentin Boggs
- Anthony Calf as Gareth Rycroft
- Cary Elwes as Lionel
- Bruce Payne as Peter Howles
- Richard Hunt as Larry
- Charles Grant as Student Photographer
- Chad Lowe as Computer Hacker (uncredited)
- Pip Torrens as Ian

== Production ==
The film was financed independently by Elliot Kastner. Kastner told Robert Boris he had between $2–3 million available to make a film in England and wanted to know if Boris had any projects which might be suitable. Boris pitched him the movie and Kastner paid him to develop a script. Kastner liked the script and financed the film, although he did not give Boris the funds the director requested to shoot additional films.

Lowe suggested Princess Stephanie of Monaco for the role of Lady Victoria as he had a crush on her. Enquiries were made but no response was received.

The film was almost entirely shot on location in Oxford.

MGM paid $6 million for the rights to distribute the movie even though the film only cost $1.8 million. Kastner was also entitled to a $1 million fee at the discretion of Frank Yablans then head of MGM. Peter Bart, an executive at MGM at the time, called the deal unprecedented.

== Reception ==
The film received poor reviews.

It opened eighth at the box office grossing $2.4 million in its first weekend. This was considered a major disappointment.

Lowe says that, "For some reason my movies do real well in Canada," shortly after the film came out. "Oxford Blues is doing well here. It's making no money in the southern United States. In the suburbs I do well, in the cities not so well."

A colleague of his said at the same time, "Rob was very hurt about the critical reaction to Oxford Blues, because he really thought it would work. But he's tough and realistic. He knows it was a failure, and he knows it wasn't his fault. That last scene, where he strips and changes clothes like a paper doll – he fought against doing that, let me tell you."
