= Jonathan Goldsmith =

American character actor (born 1938)

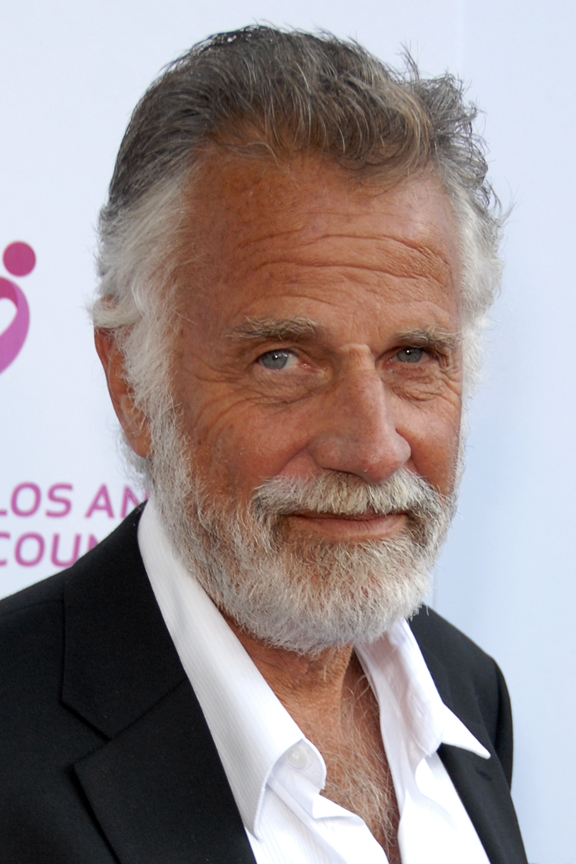
- Goldsmith at Susan G. Komen's 8th Annual Fashion For The Cure on September 24, 2009
- Born: September 26, 1938 (age 88); New York City, New York, U.S.
- Other name: Jonathan Lippe
- Education: Boston University
- Occupation: Actor
- Years active: 1963–present
- Spouse: Barbara Goldsmith (2006)
- Children: 1

Jonathan Goldsmith (born September 26, 1938) is an American character actor. He began his career on the New York stage, then started a career in film and television. He appeared in several TV shows from the 1960s to the 1990s. He is best known for appearing in television commercials for Dos Equis beer, from 2006 to 2016, as the character The Most Interesting Man in the World. He began to portray the character again in January 2026 as part of Dos Equis' revival of that advertising campaign.

== Early years ==
Goldsmith was born on September 26, 1938, in the Bronx. His parents were both Jewish, his mother a model and his father a gym teacher. Goldsmith graduated from Boston University in 1958, after which he pursued an acting career.

== Career ==
Jonathan has made over 350 television appearances in his career. Among them was the role of Marvin Palmer in the 1964 Perry Mason episode, "The Case of the Blonde Bonanza." To advance his acting career, Goldsmith moved to California from New York in 1966. Like many aspiring actors, he found it difficult to gain enough acting work to survive and wound up working various jobs, including driving a garbage truck and working in construction, to help make ends meet.

During his early years in film, Goldsmith performed as "Jonathan Lippe", having taken the name of his stepfather at the age of six. He subsequently changed his professional name back to his birth name, later recalling, "It always made me feel bad for my father, who never caused me any grief about it.... As my career grew and my son was born, I changed my name back to my real name, Goldsmith, so my father could enjoy his son's success and have a grandson to carry his name as well."

Goldsmith first established himself as an actor in Western films, with 25 such appearances. In the 1976 film The Shootist, Goldsmith played a villain who was shot between the eyes by hero John Wayne, who fired blood capsules from a special pellet gun at pointblank range into Goldsmith's face for seven painful takes.

Goldsmith also made guest appearances on 45 television series, including Gunsmoke; Bonanza; Adam-12; Knight Rider; CHiPs; Eight Is Enough; The Rockford Files; Hawaii Five-O; Barnaby Jones; MacGyver; Murder, She Wrote; Charlie's Angels; Petrocelli; Manimal; The Fall Guy; Dynasty; T.J. Hooker; Hardcastle and McCormick; Magnum, P.I.; Knots Landing; and The A-Team, as well as a few made-for-TV movies. His longest run in a television series was on Dallas, in which he appeared 17 times.

In the 1980s Goldsmith started network marketing businesses (waterless car wash products) Dri Wash & Guard, and SPRINT which was successful enough to allow him to "retire" from the Hollywood scene; he purchased an estate in the Sierra Mountains. He taught theater at Adelphi University in Garden City, New York from 1999-2004. He moved onto a large sailboat moored in Marina del Rey. In 2011 he and his wife Barbara (who was his agent when he obtained the Dos Equis role) moved to a house in the area of Manchester, Vermont.

In 2017 Goldsmith published a memoir, Stay Interesting: I Don't Always Tell Stories About My Life, But When I Do They're True and Amazing.

=== Advertising work ===
Beginning in April 2007 and continuing through 2015, Goldsmith was featured in a high-profile television ad campaign, promoting Dos Equis beer. The campaign, which transformed Goldsmith into "the most interesting man in the world", was credited for helping to fuel a 15.4 percent sales increase for the brand in the United States in 2009 and also made him into a very popular meme.

Goldsmith landed the Dos Equis gig by auditioning for the role. Auditioners were given the ending line "...and that's how I arm wrestled Fidel Castro" and asked to improvise. Goldsmith began his audition by removing one sock and then improvised for 30 minutes before reaching the concluding line. The character was inspired by his deceased sailing partner and friend Fernando Lamas.

On March 9, 2016, Dos Equis announced that it would replace Goldsmith in the role as the "Most Interesting Man in the World", saying that the brand hoped to "reboot [the character] in a way that's relevant for today's drinker so the brand doesn't get stale." In September 2016, French actor Augustin Legrand (who also speaks English and Spanish) became the new "Most Interesting Man in the World".

In June 2017, Goldsmith returned to television advertising, doing tequila ads for Astral Tequila.

In January 2026, Dos Equis announced the revival of "the most interesting man" advertising campaign, with Goldsmith returning to portray the main character. The first commercial of the new campaign was scheduled to air January 19, 2026 on ESPN during the 2026 College Football Playoff National Championship broadcast.

== Charity work ==
In the past, Goldsmith has been an advocate for landmine victim support and has assisted the Morris Animal Foundation in their efforts to prevent and cure cancer in dogs.

Goldsmith supported the S.A.B.R.E Foundation, whose mission is to protect and preserve the Siberian tiger.

Goldsmith’s other charitable causes are Free Arts for Abused Children, which pairs artists with children in protective custody, and the Stella Link Foundation, a group calling attention to child sex trafficking in Cambodia.

== Selected filmography ==
Year	Title	Role	Notes
1963	Act One	Teddy Manson	
1968	Hang 'Em High	Tommy, Cooper Hanging Party	
1968	Ice Station Zebra	Russian Aide	
1972	One Is a Lonely Number	Sherman Cooke	
1976	The Shootist	Book's Victim	Uncredited
1976	Blood Voyage	Mason	
1978	Go Tell the Spartans	Sgt. Oleonowski	
1989	Phantom of the Mall: Eric's Revenge	Harv Posner	
2018	Mamma Mia! Here We Go Again	Rafael Cienfuegos	
