= Derek Rydall =

American actor

Derek Rydall (born April 18, 1968) is an American screenwriter, screenplay consultant, script doctor, stuntman, actor and author.

== Biography ==
He has starred in films and television shows. His biggest role was the lead in Phantom of the Mall: Eric's Revenge.

As a screenwriter, screenplay consultant, and script doctor, he has been on staff for Fox and Disney, developed projects for RKO, United Artists, Miramax, Fine Line, Universal, Saturn (Nicolas Cage's company), Deepak Chopra, Wildrice, Longbow, and the creators of "Air Force One" and "Ghost". Additionally, Rydall script doctored on the feature films "Diamonds" and "No Turning Back."

Rydall is the author of "I Could've Written a Better Movie than That!: How to Make Six Figures as a Screenplay Consultant – Even if You're Not a Screenwriter," and "There's No Business Like Soul Business: a Spiritual Path to Enlightened Screenwriting, Filmmaking, and Performing arts", both published by Michael Wiese Productions.

== Personal life ==
Rydall is the nephew of film director Don Siegel.

== Screenwriting credits ==
=== Television ===
- Power Rangers Wild Force (2002)

=== Film ===
- Beethoven’s Big Break (2008)
