= Kamar de los Reyes =

Puerto Rican actor (1967–2023)

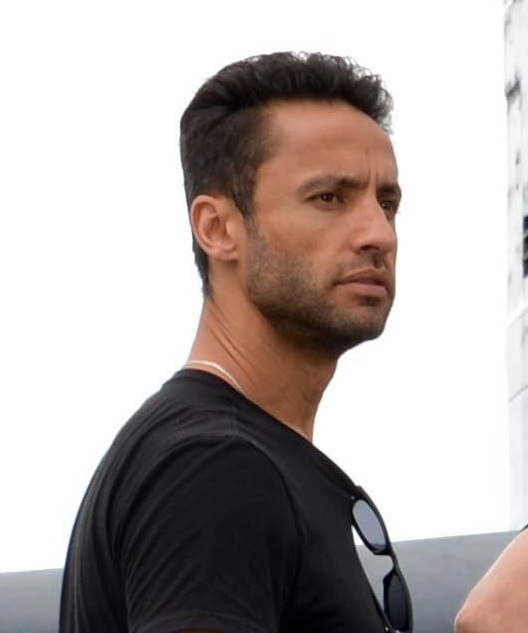
- De los Reyes in 2014
- Born: November 8, 1967; San Juan, Puerto Rico
- Died: December 24, 2023 (aged 56); Los Angeles, California, U.S.
- Occupation: Actor
- Years active: 1988–2023
- Spouse: Sherri Saum (m. 2007)
- Children: 3
- Father: Walfredo de los Reyes
- Relatives: Daniel de los Reyes (brother); Walfredo Reyes Jr. (brother)

Kamar de los Reyes (November 8, 1967 – December 24, 2023) was a Puerto Rican actor. He was best known for his portrayal of Antonio Vega on the ABC soap opera One Life to Live, primary antagonist Raul Menendez of the 2012 video game Call of Duty: Black Ops II, and as Hector Ayala / White Tiger in the Marvel Cinematic Universe series Daredevil: Born Again.

He was in Toni Braxton's video "Spanish Guitar." De los Reyes also played the demon Jobe in the fourth season of Sleepy Hollow, and Ryan Caradine on The Rookie.

== Career ==
De los Reyes starred as a Chicano boxer named Pedro 'Roadman' Quinn, in 1994's acclaimed theatrical production of Blade to the Heat.

The most arresting figure, however, is Mr. de los Reyes. More than any words he utters, the actor's haunted eyes, sunken cheeks and shaved head convey the extent of Pedro's torment. In repose, he's almost spectral. In the ring, he's like a short circuit, and his silent scream of triumph is a guaranteed spine-tingler.

— David Richards, theater reviewer for The New York Times

De los Reyes appeared alongside Patrick Stewart as a "dashing, if thick-tongued" Ferdinand in a 1995 production of William Shakespeare's The Tempest. In 1997, de los Reyes was named on People Magazine's "Fabulous 50" list. In 2001, he starred in a television film, The Way She Moves, starring Annabeth Gish and fellow soap opera star Daniel Cosgrove. He also starred in the controversial film Love and Suicide and in Toni Braxton's video for her song "Spanish Guitar". He made numerous guest appearances on shows such as Law & Order and CSI: Miami. In 1995, de los Reyes starred with James Woods, Ed Harris and Sir Anthony Hopkins in Oliver Stone's controversial biopic, Nixon, playing convicted Watergate burglar, Eugenio Martínez.

In 2012, he voiced Raul Menendez, the main antagonist of the video game Call of Duty: Black Ops II. He also provided the motion capture for the character.

In 2013, he played the role of Los Lordes gang leader, Santana in the two-part season finale of the third season of the CBS police procedural drama Blue Bloods.

In 2022, he joined the cast of CW's All American, in the role of Coach Montes.

In 2025, he made his posthumous Marvel Cinematic Universe (MCU) debut in Daredevil: Born Again as Hector Ayala / White Tiger.

== Personal life ==
Born in San Juan, Puerto Rico to Cuban percussionist Walfredo de los Reyes and a Puerto Rican mother, Matilde Pages, Kamar de los Reyes grew up in Las Vegas, Nevada. He is the brother of the percussionist of the band Chicago, Walfredo Reyes Jr., and to former Yanni, and now Zac Brown Band percussionist, Daniel de los Reyes. He married actress Sherri Saum in 2007 and they had twin boys in 2014. He had a son from a previous relationship.

== Death ==
De los Reyes died from cancer in Los Angeles, on December 24, 2023, at the age of 56. Indiana Jones and the Great Circle was dedicated to his memory alongside that of Tony Todd. The second and third episodes of Daredevil: Born Again, in which he plays Hector Ayala / White Tiger, were also dedicated to him. The second episode of Washington Black was dedicated to him as well, his only appearance in the show. The tenth episode of the sixth season of All American was also dedicated to him.

== Filmography ==
=== Television ===
Year	Title	Role	Notes
1994	The Corpse Had a Familiar Face	Puerto Rican	TV movie
1994	Valley of the Dolls	Ray Ariaz	65 episodes
1995	ER	Hernandez	Episodes: "Sleepless in Chicago", "Full Moon, Saturday Night", & "House of Cards"
1995–2009	One Life to Live	Antonio Vega	Regular cast member
1996	New York Undercover	Luis	Episodes: "Bad Blood" & "Fire Show"
1996	Swift Justice	Palo Montega	Episode: "No Holds Barred"
1998	Four Corners	Tomas Alvarez	—N/a
1998	Blood on Her Hands	Gavin Kendrick	TV movie
1998–99	Promised Land	Leon Flores	Episodes: "Denver: Welcome Home", "Out of Bounds", "The Visitor", & "All in the Family"
1999	Total Recall 2070	Jack Brant	Episodes: "Paranoid" & "Restitution"
1999	Touched by an Angel	Eddie Testaverde	Episode: "Godspeed"
1999	Early Edition	Ramon Archiletta	Episode: "Take Me Out to the Ball Game"
2000	The 27th Annual Daytime Emmy Awards	Himself	Television special
2001	The 28th Annual Daytime Emmy Awards	Himself	Television special
2001	The Way She Moves	Nicholas	TV movie
2002	The 29th Annual Daytime Emmy Awards	Himself	Television special
2003	Undefeated	Jose Beveagua	HBO TV movie
2004	The 31st Annual Daytime Emmy Awards	Himself	Television special
2004	SOAPnet Reveals ABC Soap Secrets	Himself	TV movie documentary
2005	The 32nd Annual Daytime Emmy Awards	Himself	Television special Presenter for Outstanding Young Actor in a Drama Series
2005	Law & Order	Aberto Moretti	Episode: "Dining Out"
2006	Wheel of Fortune	Himself – Celebrity Contestant	Episode: "Soap Stars 1"
2006	The 33rd Annual Daytime Emmy Awards	Himself	Television special
2006	The 2nd Annual Quill Awards	Himself	Television special
2006	SoapTalk	Himself	Episodes: dated March 6, 2006 & October 17, 2006
2007	6ABC Boscov's Thanksgiving Day Parade	Himself	TV movie
2008	Paula's Party	Himself	Episode: dated January 18, 2008
2009	CSI: Miami	Jason Molina	Episode: "Collateral Damage"
2009	Law & Order: Criminal Intent	Teru	Episodes: "The Glory That Was..." & "Alpha Dog"
2011	The Mentalist	Omar Vega	Episode: "Pink Tops"
2011	Reed Between the Lines	Anthony Guillory	Episodes: "Let's Talk About Change", "Let's Talk About Ms. Helen's Son, Part 2", & "Let's Talk About Game Night"
2013	Blue Bloods	Santana	Episodes: "The Bitter End" & "This Way Out"
2013	Pretty Little Liars	Dominic Russo	Episode: "Into the Deep"
2014	Major Crimes	Dr. Enrique Cabrera	Episode: "Frozen Assets"
2015	Castle	Manuel Villalobos	Episode: "Private Eye Caramba!"
2016	Kingdom	Detective Poole	Episode: "Take Pills"
2016	Shooter	—N/a	Episode: "Recon by Fire"
2017	Sleepy Hollow	Jobe	13 episodes
2017	Home and Family	Himself	Episode: "Carla Jimenez/Kamar de los Reyes/Shirley Chung/King"
2018	MacGyver	Captain Delarosa	Episode: "Wind + Water"
2018	The Gifted	Sebastian Diaz	Episode: "coMplications"
2018	SEAL Team	Comandante Salas, Priest	Episodes: "Prisoner's Dilemma" and "Santa Muerte"
2019	The Passage	Julio Martinez	Episode: "You Are Like the Sun", "You Are Not That Girl Anymore", & "Stay in the Light"
2021	The Rookie	Ryan Caradine	5 episodes
2022–2023	All American	Coach Montes	8 episodes
2025	Daredevil: Born Again	Hector Ayala / White Tiger	6 episodes; Posthumous release
2025	Washington Black	Captain Alvarez	1 episode; Posthumous release

=== Film ===
Year	Film	Role	Notes
1988	Salsa	Featured Dancer	credited as Kamar Reyes
1989	Ghetto Blaster	Chato	—N/a
1989	East L.A. Warriors	Paulo	credited as Kamar Reyes
1990	Coldfire	Nick	—N/a
1991	Lethal Ninja	Sonny	Direct-to-video
1992	The Silencer	Kickboxer	—N/a
1993	Street Knight	Smokey	—N/a
1993	Da Vinci's War	Latin Dancer	—N/a
1993	Fatherhood	Drug Dealer #2	—N/a
1995	Nixon	Eugenio Martinez	Watergate Burglar
1996	Daedalus Is Dead	Wilson Ortiz	Short film
1997	In Search of a Dream	Marcos	—N/a
2000	Mambo Café	Manny	—N/a
2000	The Cell	Officer Alexander	—N/a
2004	One Life to Live's: Daytime's Greatest Weddings	Antonio Vega / Antinio Vega	Video documentary, Archive footage
2005	Love & Suicide	Tomas	—N/a
2005	Cayo	Young Ivan	—N/a
2010	Salt	Secret Service Agent	—N/a
2013	Hot Guys with Guns	Producer One	—N/a
2014	LA Apocalypse	Carlos Dorado	—N/a
2016	Abducted: The Story of Jocelyn Shaker	Javier	—N/a
2017	Amelia 2.0	Vaughn	—N/a
2017	First Strike Butcher Knife	—N/a	Short film

=== Video games ===
Year	Title	Role	Notes
2012	Call of Duty: Black Ops II	Raul Menendez	—N/a
2018	Call of Duty: Black Ops 4	Raul Menendez	—N/a
2022	Call of Duty: Vanguard	Raul Menendez	—N/a
2022	Call of Duty: Mobile	Raul Menendez	—N/a
2024	Indiana Jones and the Great Circle	Barranca	Posthumous release
