= List of Reed Between the Lines episodes =

The following is a list of episodes for the BET sitcom, Reed Between the Lines. The show debuted on October 11, 2011. The series follows a modern-day blended family as they navigate life’s ups and downs with wit and humor. It stars Tracee Ellis Ross and Malcolm-Jamal Warner as Dr. Carla and Alex Reed. All episode titles begin with "Let's Talk About..." before the subject presented in the episode.

The series was renewed for a second season on April 12, 2011. It was later announced in August 2012 that Tracee Ellis Ross would not return for the second season and three new cast members (Charlie Robinson, Michole White, and Tony Rock) would be joining the cast. On September 12, 2013, it was revealed that Reed Between the Lines has been canceled and that Young Man on Campus would not be green-lit to series. In December 2013, it was revealed by Malcolm-Jamal Warner that an entire second season had been shot, but won't be airing.

== Series overview ==
Season	Episodes	Originally released	
Season	Episodes	First released	Last released
1	25	October 11, 2011	December 20, 2011
2	8	September 18, 2015	October 9, 2015

== Episodes ==
=== Season 1 (2011) ===
No. overall	No. in season	Title	Directed by	Written by	Original release date	Prod. code	US viewers (millions)
1	1	"Let's Talk About Jealousy"	Sheldon Epps	Kellie R. Griffin	October 11, 2011	101	3.299
Keenan and Kaci fuss about who was born first and Kaci's new love interest, Dillon. Later in the episode, a slightly obnoxious Dillon joins the family for dinner. When Dillon's mother Dominique comes to pick him up, Carla discovers that she already knows her. Dominique is a sex addict that she recently treated at her office. Dominique asks Alex if he'll be chaperoning a school trip that she'll be attending the next day. Carla decides she will attend the trip instead. Alex, who is a stay- at- home English professor, shows up to the museum anyway, but is rushed out by his wife when she senses Dominique's advances. Guest star: Robin Givens as Dominique
2	2	"Let's Talk About Daddy's Little Girl"	Mary Lou Belli	Teri Schaffer	October 11, 2011	102	2.910
Carla and Alex are excited that the kids are out for the night. Alexis, the seven-year-old "baby", is headed to her first sleep over and Keenan and Kaci are off to a party. After a candle lit dinner, the couple is ready for dessert, but the evening is cut short when Alexis is brought home early. It turns out that she threw a tantrum and was mean to the other children. The neighbor insinuates that Alexis might have a behavioral problem. Carla initially disagrees of course but later reconsiders the notion. After a confession from Alex who admits to spoiling his daughter, and Alexis, who admitted to acting out because she couldn't get her way, the family decides to stop catering to her. It takes some time but in the end Alexis grows to be more independent. She even prepares her own bowl of cereal. Guest star: Wesley Jonathan as Michael
3	3	"Let's Talk About Anger Management"	Mary Lou Belli	Arthur Harris	October 18, 2011	103	1.191
Carla tries to help Helen, who has already enlisted in phone psychics, make sense of her dream about Idris Elba. Helen is not happy with a clinical analysis and prefers interpretations that cost 3 dollars a minute. Later Rashaad, a professional basketball player, is forced to see Dr. Reed for anger management. She drops some gems about his displaced anger and victim role. Her advice: Smile more. Rashaad takes the doc's suggestions but ultimately plays too nice. His new attitude affects his game and he credits his new style to Dr. Reed. Now everyone is mad at her, and her family. Fans blame her for his new losing formula but after another visit, she gets to the real issue behind his behavior and forces him to take ownership for all his decisions. Guest star: Ron Artest as Rashaad Absent: Melissa De Sousa as Gabriella
4	4	"Let's Talk About Hair"	Sheldon Epps	Angela Yarbrough	October 18, 2011	104	1.118
Kaci and Keenan audition for the high school play. Keenan lands the stage manager role and is excited because the position is one of power and girls like men in power. Kaci secures the lead as Queen of the Elves but is forced to wear a long and matted wig because a queen's hair is always "flowing and luxurious". Hating the look of the wig, she decides to just straighten her own curly do. She resents having to do this because she's convinced her natural curls are pretty enough. That is until Blake, her crush, compliments her on her new look. Suddenly she's in love with her straight hair and even contemplates getting a relaxer. Carla, really concerned about Kaci's decision, talks it over with Alex and decides it time to have that "other" important talk mothers have with daughters. Carla and Alex wait until Blake comes over to stage a performance. Carla pretends to be a Stepford wife, dusting, cooking and totally catering to her man. She downplays her accomplishments and career and focuses solely on Alex and his needs. Kaci grows angry at the antics but realizes she should never have to change for a man. The next day Blake confirms this affirmation with an "I always liked you." Guest star: Christopher B. Duncan as Mr. Harris Absent: Melissa De Sousa as Gabriella and Anna Maria Horsford as Ms. Helen
5	5	"Let's Talk About Competition"	Sheldon Epps	George Blake	October 25, 2011	105	0.950
Carla and Alex join Gabriella's dance class and Carla has trouble catching the beat. When Gabriella tries to help her, Carla feels that Gabriella is being condescending towards her. They later settle it with a dance-off. Meanwhile, Keenan decides he's going to run for 9th grade class president and asks Kaci to be his campaign manager. She accepts, but later doesn't feel like Keenan is taking the election seriously. Instead, she enters the election herself and they both try to outplay one another. Guest star: Romeo Miller as Darius Absent: Anna Maria Horsford as Ms. Helen
6	6	"Let's Talk About Dishonesty"	Mary Lou Belli	Fred Johnson & Arthur Harris	October 25, 2011	106	0.954
Carla treats a new patient whose greedy children want control over her estate. Carla doesn't see anything wrong with the woman at first, but later discovers she has Sundowners syndrome where she's lucid during the day, but starts to lose her mental faculties as the day goes on. Meanwhile, Keenan goes out with the family for ice cream instead of telling them he needs more time to study for a standardized test. In order to pass, he copies answers from the girl sitting next to him, not knowing that they have different tests. When he scores 13%, his teacher calls Alex and they have a meeting with Keenan to suggest that he be put in a program for kids who are struggling academically in an attempt to get him to admit the truth. When he doesn't, Alex begins to treat him as if he isn't capable of doing simple tasks. Guest star: Amy Hill as Mrs. McDonaugh
7	7	"Let's Talk About Computer Love"	Linda Mendoza	George Blake	November 1, 2011	107	0.918
It's risqué business for Keenan when Alex finds out he has been sneaking downstairs at night to look at lusty computer sites. Meanwhile, Carla counsels a daughter (Lauren London) who has given up on her dreams because she's too concerned about her mother, Valencia. Valencia (Vernee Watson) is an alcoholic in denial who is verbally abusive towards her daughter. Carla tries to get her to admit she has a problem. Guest stars: Lauren London as Jentry and Vernee Watson as Valencia Absent: Melissa De Sousa as Gabriella
8	8	"Let's Talk About Affairs"	Sheldon Epps	Stacey McClain	November 1, 2011	108	0.963
Carla treats a couple who she believes is married. She later finds out that they are only dating and the man is cheating on his wife. He claims the relationship is over and he and his wife are only staying together for their kids. This is doesn't sit right with Carla because it reminds her of how her own father was having an affair. Meanwhile, Alex sees that someone has broken the vase that Carla bought and asks the kids who did it. None of them confess, so he punishes them by not letting them use anything with a screen. After they've had enough, they each separately confess. When Alex gets them all in the kitchen, he reveals that each of them confessed to the same crime. It is later revealed that Ms. Helen broke the vase. Guest stars: Leon Robinson as Don and Lela Rochon as Sherri Absent: Melissa De Sousa as Gabriella
9	9	"Let's Talk About Boys in Tights"	Leonard R. Garner, Jr.	Stacey McClain	November 8, 2011	109	1.131
Alex thinks that Keenan is lazy and wants him to become more active. He takes Keenan down to the Recreation Center to choose an activity to participate in. Keenan chooses Rhythmic gymnastics and Alex doesn't believe it's a real sport. After feuding with Carla about it, he decides to support Keenan and the family goes to watch his performance. Meanwhile, Gabriella wades into the dating pool after taking Ms. Helen's advice about men. She begins seeing a water delivery man (Mel Jackson), but he proves to be an obsessive sort. Gabriella now needs Ms. Helen to help get rid of him. Guest star: Mel Jackson as James
10	10	"Let's Talk About Forgiveness"	Joe Menendez	Meg DeLoatch	November 8, 2011	112	1.163
Carla and Alex attend Alex's high-school reunion. There they see one of Alex's ex-girlfriends, Vanessa, who gives Alex a dirty look when she walks by. When Carla asks him what it was about, it is revealed that Alex cheated on Vanessa 20 years ago with her sister. Carla is upset because when she first met Alex, she asked him if he had ever cheated on one of his ex-girlfriends and he lied. Secrets about Carla's past are later revealed. Meanwhile, Ms. Helen is babysitting the kids while Carla and Alex are away. The new girl next door that Keenan likes stops by and he has trouble finding the right words. Kaci helps him by texting him things to say in exchange for him doing her chores for two weeks. Guest star: Eddie George as JJ; Absent: Melissa De Sousa as Gabriella Note: Due to this episode airing out of production order, Alexis mentions what school she goes to before the episode where she went back to school aired.
11	11	"Let's Talk About Change"	Joe Menendez	Meg DeLoatch	November 15, 2011	111	1.102
Alexis asks Keenan and Kaci if they like school and they tell her how fun it can be. Alexis then decides she wants to go back to school. Carla and Alex say they'll look into it and they get her into a great school. On her first day, Alexis freaks out, so Alex takes her to the zoo. On her second day she comes and cries when Carla asks how her day was. Meanwhile, Gabriella suggests that Carla hires an intern to help out Ms. Helen. The intern they hire does a great by doing things such as getting the ladies coffee. Carla later fires him when he tries to replace Ms. Helen. Guest stars: Kamar De Los Reyes as Mr. Guillory and Darryl Stephens as Perry Anderson
12	12	"Let's Talk About Scared Money"	Mary Lou Belli	Lamont Ferrell	November 15, 2011	110	1.127
Keenan wins a school raffle and wants to spend his money on materialistic things. Alex takes him to his first apartment to show him the value of money and teach him a valuable lesson about finances. Elsewhere, Kaci visits Carla's workplace as part of a school assignment and Ms. Helen realizes that she made a bigger impact on Kaci than Carla did. Note: This is the first episode not to feature any special guest star. Absent: Melissa De Sousa as Gabriella
13	13	"Let's Talk About Boundaries"	Eric Dean Seaton	Teri Schaffer	November 22, 2011	113	0.729
Kaci joins a school protest revolving around a recycling program and Alex becomes extra-supportive. Meanwhile, Carla, Gabriella and Ms. Helen attend a spiritual spa and get kicked out. Guest star: Affion Crockett as Warren
14	14	"Let's Talk About School Fundraisers"	Eric Dean Seaton	Lamont Ferrell	November 22, 2011	114	0.734
Carla joins a school fund-raising committee but faces off against a group of ill-tempered mothers. Meanwhile, the children search for Alexis's escaped gerbil. Guest star: Lauren Tom as Kim Absent: Melissa De Sousa as Gabby and Anna Maria Horsford as Miss. Helen
15	15	"Let's Talk About Ms. Helen's Son, Part 1"	Malcolm-Jamal Warner	Arthur Harris	November 27, 2011	115	1.772
Ms. Helen's war-vet son returns from Afghanistan with post-traumatic stress disorder, for which Carla suggests he receive counseling. Meanwhile, Alex assists Alexis with her school project—but he helps too much. Guest star: Sean Patrick Thomas as Kenneth Note: At the end of this episode it features Tracee Ellis Ross and Malcolm-Jamal Warner talking about post-traumatic stress disorder.
16	16	"Let's Talk About Ms. Helen's Son, Part 2"	Malcolm-Jamal Warner	Arthur Harris	November 27, 2011	116	1.303
Conclusion. Ms. Helen's war-vet son is asked to reach out for help for his post-traumatic stress disorder. Meanwhile, Gabriella has a crush on Alexis' teacher—and so does Alexis. Guest stars: Kamar De Los Reyes as Mr. Guillory and Sean Patrick Thomas as Kenneth
17	17	"Let's Talk About Writer's Block"	Sheldon Epps	George Blake	November 29, 2011	117	0.957
Gabriella helps Alex with writer's block. Meanwhile, Kaci produces an informational video about water conservation, and Keenan helps the video go viral.
18	18	"Let's Talk About Performance"	Sheldon Epps	Jacque Edmonds	November 29, 2011	118	0.900
A student gives Alex an unfavorable review on a website. Meanwhile, one of Carla's patients suffers an on-air misadventure that goes viral. Guest star: Lauren London as Jentry
19	19	"Let's Talk About Fast Girls"	Sheldon Epps	Arthur Harris	December 6, 2011	119	1.040
Carla, Alex and Alexis leave for an overnight school trip, which gives Keenan and Kaci a prime opportunity to throw a house party. There's risqué business at the bash when Keenan is the recipient of a girl's lusty advances. Guest star: Kamar De Los Reyes as Mr. Guillory Absent: Melissa De Sousa as Gabriella and Anna Maria Horsford as Ms. Helen
20	20	"Let's Talk About College Boys"	Leonard R. Garner Jr.	Jacque Edmonds	December 6, 2011	120	1.117
A 14-year-old prodigy decides to quit college after meeting Kaci and the Reeds. Elsewhere, Alex attends a college fair. Guest stars: Dawnn Lewis as Trishelle and Jacob Latimore as Jacob Matthews Absent: Melissa De Sousa as Gabriella and Anna Maria Horsford as Ms. Helen NOTE: This episode serves as a backdoor pilot for a proposed spin-off series.
21	21	"Let's Talk About Two Dates for the Dance"	Leonard R. Garner Jr.	Angela Yarbrough	December 13, 2011	121	0.831
Kaci and Alex anticipate attending a father-daughter dance, but plans change when Kaci's biological father unexpectedly arrives. Elsewhere, Keenan's friend develops a crush on Carla. Guest star: Charles Malik Whitfield as Marcus Reynolds Absent: Melissa De Sousa as Gabriella and Anna Maria Horsford as Ms. Helen
22	22	"Let's Talk About Game Night"	Mary Lou Belli	George Blake	December 13, 2011	122	0.831
It all gets dicey when Carla and Alex host game night. Meanwhile, a baseball-bat-wielding Alexis puts a hole in a wall in Kaci's room. Guest stars: Kamar De Los Reyes as Mr. Guillory
23	23	"Let's Talk About My Old Therapist"	Leonard R. Garner Jr.	Raynelle Swilling & Teri Schaffer	December 20, 2011	123	1.057
Carla is confused when she receives a "Save the Date" card from her ex-husbands upcoming wedding, which brings up unresolved issues. Alex recommends that she goes to her therapist. Meanwhile, the children consider donating to charity. Guest star: Roma Maffia as Dr. Georgia Yarbrough Absent: Melissa De Sousa as Gabby and Anna Maria Horsford as Miss. Helen
24	24	"Let's Talk About Dating Advice"	Robbie Countryman	Regina Y. Hicks & Karin Gist	December 20, 2011	124	0.985
Dr. Stokes is known as "The Love Guru", who has written several self-help books teaching women how to get a man with the cooking-looking sexy and putting him on a pedestal way. Both Dr. Stokes and Carla are invited to speak on a relationship panel for a Women Empowering Conference. During the panel, the two colleagues seem to have different views on how to get a man. Elsewhere, Keenan is enlisted to join a popular school clique. Guest star: Anthony Anderson as Dr. Stokes
25	25	"Let's Talk About Talking"	Mary Lou Belli	Warren Hutcherson	December 20, 2011	125	0.987
Alex's parents come to visit the Reed family. Alex comes to find out that his father, Monroe, has been driving his mother Liz, crazy. Carla notices how unhappy Alex's mother is and encourages her mother-in-law to speak up for herself. Meanwhile, the children receive decidedly old-fashioned T-shirts from their grandparents. Guest stars: Robert Hooks as Monroe and Hattie Winston as Liz NOTE: This is the final appearances of Tracee Ellis Ross and Melissa De Sousa.

=== Season 2 (2015) ===
No. overall	No. in season	Title	Directed by	Written by	Original release date
26	1	"It's Complicated"	Oz Scott	Felicia D. Henderson	September 18, 2015
Big changes have unfolded in the Reed household. Alex becomes head of the English department at New Rochelle University. Meanwhile, Carla decides to pursue her dream job in L.A., leaving the kids back home with Alex. Making sure that the transition doesn't affect the kids or Alex, Carla asks Alex's dad, Monroe, his two best friends, Simone and Julius, and Ms. Helen, her former receptionist, to give their support to her family while she's away. NOTE: Michole White, Tony Rock and Charles Robinson join the cast. The character of Grandpa Monroe was originated by Kevin Hooks in the previous season.
27	2	"It Takes a Village"	Oz Scott	Sara Finney-Johnson	September 18, 2015
Alex agrees to attend a faculty mixer at NRU with Simone and Julius but the event soon goes awry. Meanwhile, Grandpa Monroe looks after the kids.
28	3	"Men and Women Can Be"	Mary Lou Belli	Bill Boulware	September 25, 2015
Alex becomes close friends with the beautiful professor Lori Samuels despite Simone and Julius teasing him about his “platonic” relationship. Alex rediscovers his love for music and decides to get his old band back together. When Lori joins in the fun, the playful chemistry between her and Alex becomes palpable. Keenan thinks Kaci's new friend, Jasmine, has a crush on him. Guest star: Sharon Leal as Lori Samuels
29	4	"The Truth Hurts"	Mary Lou Belli	Felicia D. Henderson	September 25, 2015
Rita goes on a date and Simone and Julius spot her, disagreeing on whether to be honest with Julius or not.
30	5	"The C Is Silent"	Rob Schiller	Matthew Claybrooks	October 2, 2015
Alex misses the registration deadline to enroll district spelling bee due to Carla's flight delay and calls in a favor.
31	6	"Sometimes You're Picked, Sometimes You Choose"	Rob Schiller	Felicia D. Henderson & Lisa McQuillian	October 2, 2015
Kaci and Keenan's biological dad comes to town to watch Kaci perform in a local talent show and is impressed.
32	7	"I'm Not Superhuman"	Ali LeRoi	Bill Boulware & Dash Hawkins	October 9, 2015
Alex and Monroe on raising the kids; Monroe moves out.
33	8	"You Have to Let Them Go"	Ali LeRoi	Felicia D. Henderson & Sara Finney-Johnson	October 9, 2015
Kaci acts quiet and removed; Alex and her mother are getting a divorce.
