= List of Without a Trace episodes =

Without a Trace is a police procedural television show, which was originally broadcast on CBS from September 26, 2002 to May 19, 2009. The series, set in New York City, is about a fictitious full-time FBI missing persons unit. Most episodes follow the search for an individual where it is of great importance that the person be found quickly. The stories also focus on the personal lives of the team members to show how their different experiences give them insight, and sometimes traumatic reactions, to certain cases.

A total of 160 episodes were produced over 7 seasons. The first two seasons have been released on DVD in region 1. In region 2 seasons 1–6 are available on DVD. Seasons 1–5 are available on DVD in region 4. No seasons were released on HD DVD and as of January 2026 there has not been an announcement about a release of the show on Blu-ray.

== Series overview ==
Season	Episodes	Originally released	
Season	Episodes	First released	Last released
1	23	September 26, 2002	May 15, 2003
2	24	September 25, 2003	May 20, 2004
3	23	September 23, 2004	May 19, 2005
4	24	September 29, 2005	May 18, 2006
5	24	September 24, 2006	May 10, 2007
6	18	September 27, 2007	May 15, 2008
7	24	September 23, 2008	May 19, 2009

== Episodes ==
=== Season 1 (2002–03) ===
No. overall	No. in season	Title	Directed by	Written by	Original release date	Prod. code	U.S. viewers (millions)
1	1	"Pilot"	David Nutter	Hank Steinberg	September 26, 2002	475182	16.21
2	2	"Birthday Boy"	David Nutter	Hank Steinberg	October 3, 2002	175651	14.53
3	3	"He Saw, She Saw"	Rachel Talalay	Jan Nash	October 10, 2002	175653	15.94
4	4	"Between the Cracks"	Steve Gomer	Ed Redlich	October 17, 2002	175654	14.84
5	5	"Suspect"	Peter Markle	Allison Abner	October 24, 2002	175657	15.75
6	6	"Silent Partner"	Randy Zisk	Greg Walker	October 31, 2002	175655	15.50
7	7	"Snatch Back"	Leslie Libman	Stacy Rukeyser	November 7, 2002	175656	14.57
8	8	"Little Big Man"	Paul Holahan	Jacob Epstein	November 14, 2002	175658	15.41
9	9	"In Extremis"	Peter Markle	Francisco Castro	November 21, 2002	175659	13.94
10	10	"Midnight Sun"	Michelle MacLaren	Hank Steinberg	December 12, 2002	175652	14.83
11	11	"Maple Street"	John McNaughton	Maria Maggenti	January 9, 2003	175660	16.34
12	12	"Underground Railroad"	Tom McLoughlin	Hank Steinberg	January 16, 2003	175662	17.51
13	13	"Hang On to Me"	Paul Holahan	Ed Redlich	January 30, 2003	175661	16.59
14	14	"The Friendly Skies"	Paul Holahan	Hank Steinberg	February 6, 2003	175663	15.03
15	15	"There Goes the Bride"	Deran Sarafian	Steven Kane	February 20, 2003	175665	17.78
16	16	"Clare de Lune"	Mel Damski	Allison Abner	February 27, 2003	175664	18.80
17	17	"Kam Li"	Randy Zisk	Jacob Epstein	March 13, 2003	175666	15.38
18	18	"The Source"	Peter Markle	Jan Nash & Greg Walker	April 3, 2003	175667	13.78
19	19	"Victory for Humanity"	Charles Correll	Hank Steinberg	April 10, 2003	175668	17.54
20	20	"No Mas"	Paul Holahan	Greg Walker	April 24, 2003	175669	14.02
21	21	"Are You Now or Have You Ever Been?"	Peter Markle	Harry Litman & Ed Redlich	May 1, 2003	175672	12.64
22	22	"Fall Out (Part I)"	Kevin Hooks	Hank Steinberg	May 8, 2003	175670	14.92
23	23	"Fall Out (Part II)"	Paul Holahan	Hank Steinberg	May 15, 2003	175671	15.66

=== Season 2 (2003–04) ===
No. overall	No. in season	Title	Directed by	Written by	Original release date	Prod. code	U.S. viewers (millions)
24	1	"The Bus"	Paul Holahan	Hank Steinberg	September 25, 2003	176401	16.68
25	2	"Revelations"	Charles Correll	Jan Nash	October 2, 2003	176402	15.26
26	3	"Confidence"	Randy Zisk	Greg Walker	October 9, 2003	176403	16.15
27	4	"Prodigy"	Paul Holahan	Maria Maggenti & Judy Sachs	October 23, 2003	176404	14.72
28	5	"Copycat"	Tim Matheson	Jennifer Levin	October 30, 2003	176405	15.59
29	6	"Our Sons and Daughters"	Paul Holahan	John Bellucci	November 6, 2003	176407	18.45
30	7	"A Tree Falls"	Rob Bailey	Allison Abner	November 13, 2003	176408	16.32
31	8	"Trip Box"	David Nutter	Simon Mirren	November 20, 2003	176409	15.74
32	9	"Moving On"	John Peters	David H. Goodman	December 11, 2003	176410	16.40
33	10	"Coming Home"	Tony Wharmby	Jan Nash	December 18, 2003	176411	19.35
34	11	"Exposure"	Charles Correll	Dale Kutzera	January 8, 2004	176406	18.18
35	12	"Hawks and Handsaws"	Kevin Hooks	Jennifer Levin & Ed Redlich	January 15, 2004	176412	17.42
36	13	"Life Rules"	John F. Showalter	Story by : Melissa Maxwell & Erika Johnson and Hank Steinberg; Teleplay by : Hank Steinberg	January 29, 2004	176413	17.48
37	14	"The Line"	Paul Holahan	Greg Walker & Alexis Genya	February 5, 2004	176414	18.92
38	15	"Wannabe"	David M. Barrett	Hank Steinberg	February 12, 2004	176415	20.12
39	16	"Risen"	Tony Wharmby	David H. Goodman	February 19, 2004	176416	20.12
40	17	"Gung Ho"	Paul Holahan	Dale Kutzera & Simon Mirren	February 26, 2004	176417	16.98
41	18	"Legacy"	Tim Matheson	Allison Abner & Maria Maggenti	March 11, 2004	176418	19.68
42	19	"Doppelgänger"	Andy Wolk	Hank Steinberg	April 1, 2004	176419	18.12
43	20	"Shadows"	Randy Zisk	Jennifer Levin & Jan Nash	April 15, 2004	176420	17.13
44	21	"Two Families"	John F. Showalter	Ed Redlich	April 29, 2004	176421	16.70
45	22	"The Season"	Tim Matheson	Story by : Greg Walker; Teleplay by : Jennifer Levin & Jan Nash	May 6, 2004	176422	16.04
46	23	"Lost and Found"	Hank Steinberg	Hank Steinberg	May 13, 2004	176423	17.73
47	24	"Bait"	Paul Holahan	Story by : Dale Kutzera & Simon Mirren; Teleplay by : Jan Nash & Greg Walker	May 20, 2004	176424	19.62

=== Season 3 (2004–05) ===
No. overall	No. in season	Title	Directed by	Written by	Original release date	Prod. code	U.S. viewers (millions)
48	1	"In the Dark"	Paul Holahan	Hank Steinberg	September 23, 2004	2T5151	21.51
49	2	"Thou Shalt Not"	Randy Zisk	Jennifer Levin	October 7, 2004	2T5152	21.31
50	3	"Light Years"	Craig Zisk	Greg Walker	October 14, 2004	2T5153	19.35
51	4	"Upstairs Downstairs"	Timothy Busfield	Hank Steinberg & Judy Sachs	October 21, 2004	2T5154	18.49
52	5	"American Goddess"	Tony Goldwyn	Maria Maggenti	October 28, 2004	2T5155	22.06
53	6	"Nickel and Dimed (Part I)"	Martha Mitchell	David Amann	November 4, 2004	2T5156	21.77
54	7	"Nickel and Dimed (Part II)"	John F. Showalter	Jan Nash	November 11, 2004	2T5157	20.46
55	8	"Doppelgänger II"	Timothy Busfield	Hank Steinberg	November 18, 2004	2T5158	19.75
56	9	"Trials"	David Von Ancken	David H. Goodman	November 25, 2004	2T5159	19.75
57	10	"Malone v. Malone"	Hank Steinberg	Hank Steinberg	December 9, 2004	2T5160	19.49
58	11	"4.0"	Ken Collins	Jennifer Levin	January 6, 2005	2T5161	23.76
59	12	"Penitence"	Scott White	Allison Abner	January 13, 2005	2T5162	18.77
60	13	"Volcano"	John F. Showalter	Greg Walker	February 3, 2005	2T5163	19.33
61	14	"Neither Rain Nor Sleet"	Timothy Busfield	Jan Nash	February 10, 2005	2T5164	19.63
62	15	"Party Girl"	Rob Bailey	Amanda Segal Marks	February 17, 2005	2T5165	21.01
63	16	"Manhunt"	Jeannot Szwarc	David Amann	February 24, 2005	2T5166	21.37
64	17	"Lone Star"	Paul Holahan	David Mongan	March 10, 2005	2T5167	23.32
65	18	"Transitions"	Timothy Busfield	David H. Goodman	March 31, 2005	2T5168	21.27
66	19	"Second Sight"	Jeff T. Thomas	Jan Nash	April 14, 2005	2T5170	19.99
67	20	"The Bogie Man"	Rob Bailey	Jennifer Levin	May 4, 2005	2T5171	11.93
68	21	"Off the Tracks"	John F. Showalter	Greg Walker	May 5, 2005	2T5172	17.92
69	22	"John Michaels"	Hank Steinberg	Hank Steinberg	May 12, 2005	2T5169	18.92
70	23	"Endgame"	Jeannot Szwarc	David Amann	May 19, 2005	2T5173	21.43

=== Season 4 (2005–06) ===
No. overall	No. in season	Title	Directed by	Written by	Original release date	Prod. code	U.S. viewers (millions)
71	1	"Showdown"	John F. Showalter	David Amann	September 29, 2005	2T6101	20.98
72	2	"Safe"	Jeannot Szwarc	David Grae	October 6, 2005	2T6102	21.25
73	3	"From the Ashes"	Timothy Busfield	Gwendolyn M. Parker	October 13, 2005	2T6103	20.55
74	4	"Lost Time"	Martha Mitchell	David H. Goodman	October 20, 2005	2T6104	19.82
75	5	"Honor Bound"	Ken Collins	Amantha Segel Marks	October 27, 2005	2T6105	21.75
76	6	"Viuda Negra"	Paul McCrane	Scott A. Williams	November 3, 2005	2T6106	20.44
77	7	"The Innocents"	Martha Mitchell	Jan Nash	November 10, 2005	2T6107	20.78
78	8	"A Day in the Life"	Jeannot Szwarc	Hank Steinberg	November 17, 2005	2T6108	21.66
79	9	"Freefall"	John F. Showalter	David Mongan	November 24, 2005	2T6109	19.50
80	10	"When Darkness Falls"	Jeff T. Thomas	Hank Steinberg & Diego Gutierrez	December 8, 2005	2T6110	21.76
81	11	"Blood Out"	Scott White	Gwendolyn M. Parker	January 5, 2006	2T6111	20.94
82	12	"Patient X"	Timothy Busfield	David Amann	January 19, 2006	2T6112	23.12
83	13	"Rage"	Kate Woods	Scott A. Williams	January 26, 2006	2T6113	22.30
84	14	"Odds or Evens"	Martha Mitchell	David H. Goodman	February 2, 2006	2T6114	20.80
85	15	"The Stranger"	John F. Showalter	Jan Nash	February 9, 2006	2T6115	20.34
86	16	"The Little Things"	John Polson	David Grae	March 2, 2006	2T6116	19.78
87	17	"Check Your Head"	Timothy Busfield	Diego Gutierrez	March 9, 2006	2T6117	20.28
88	18	"The Road Home"	Chad Lowe	David Mongan	March 30, 2006	2T6118	18.48
89	19	"Expectations"	Rosemary Rodriguez	David Rapp	April 13, 2006	2T6119	18.62
90	20	"More Than This"	Timothy Busfield	Scott A. Williams	April 20, 2006	2T6120	16.93
91	21	"Shattered"	Jeannot Szwarc	Amanda Segel Marks & David H. Goodman	April 27, 2006	2T6121	17.93
92	22	"Requiem"	John F. Showalter	Jan Nash	May 4, 2006	2T6122	19.11
93	23	"White Balance"	Jeff T. Thomas	Greg Walker	May 11, 2006	2T6123	19.19
94	24	"Crossroads"	Jeannot Szwarc	David Amann	May 18, 2006	2T6124	19.81

=== Season 5 (2006–07) ===
No. overall	No. in season	Title	Directed by	Written by	Original release date	Prod. code	U.S. viewers (millions)
95	1	"Stolen"	Randy Zisk	David Amann	September 24, 2006	2T7852	17.56
96	2	"Candy"	Jonathan Kaplan	Jan Nash & Greg Walker	October 1, 2006	2T7851	14.51
97	3	"911"	Jeannot Szwarc	Amanda Segel Marks	October 8, 2006	2T7853	15.27
98	4	"All for One"	Kate Woods	Byron Balasco	October 15, 2006	2T7854	15.17
99	5	"The Damage Done"	John Peters	Diego Gutierrez	October 22, 2006	2T7855	14.79
100	6	"The Calm Before"	Peter Markle	Jan Nash	October 29, 2006	2T7856	13.37
101	7	"All the Sinners, Saints"	Martha Mitchell	Jose Molina	November 5, 2006	2T7857	13.02
102	8	"Win Today"	Jeannot Szwarc	David H. Goodman	November 12, 2006	2T7858	15.22
103	9	"Watch Over Me"	Bobby Roth	Byron Balasco & David Mongan	November 19, 2006	2T7859	14.51
104	10	"The Thing with Feathers"	Scott White	Gwendolyn M. Parker	December 3, 2006	2T7860	14.28
105	11	"Fade-Away"	Jonathan Kaplan	David Amann & Greg Walker	December 10, 2006	2T7861	13.89
106	12	"Tail Spin"	Peter Markle	Diego Gutierrez	January 7, 2007	2T7862	14.19
107	13	"Eating Away"	Martha Mitchell	David H. Goodman & Alicia Kirk	January 14, 2007	2T7863	13.39
108	14	"Primed"	John F. Showalter	Jan Nash	January 21, 2007	2T7864	13.72
109	15	"Desert Springs"	Eriq La Salle	David Amann	February 18, 2007	2T7865	11.42
110	16	"Without You"	Jeannot Szwarc	José Molina	March 4, 2007	2T7866	14.88
111	17	"Deep Water"	Paul McCrane	Anthony LaPaglia & Byron Balasco	March 11, 2007	2T7867	17.53
112	18	"Connections"	Rosemary Rodriguez	David Mongan & David H. Goodman	March 18, 2007	2T7868	13.05
113	19	"At Rest"	Jonathan Kaplan	Gwendolyn M. Parker & Jan Nash	March 25, 2007	2T7869	12.75
114	20	"Skin Deep"	Eric Close	Amanda Segel Marks	April 8, 2007	2T7870	14.12
115	21	"Crash and Burn"	John Polson	David Amann & Alicia Kirk	April 15, 2007	2T7871	14.31
116	22	"One and Only"	Kate Woods	Diego Gutierrez & Byron Balasco	April 29, 2007	2T7872	13.72
117	23	"Two of Us"	John F. Showalter	Greg Walker & José Molina	May 6, 2007	2T7873	14.71
118	24	"The Beginning"	Jeannot Szwarc	David H. Goodman & Jan Nash	May 10, 2007	2T7874	14.31

=== Season 6 (2007–08) ===
- "Where and Why" is the conclusion of a crossover that begins on the CSI: Crime Scene Investigation episode "Who and What".

No. overall	No. in season	Title	Directed by	Written by	Original release date	Prod. code	U.S. viewers (millions)
119	1	"Lost Boy"	John Polson	Byron Balasco & Greg Walker	September 27, 2007	3T6104	16.68
120	2	"Clean Up"	Chris Long	Gwendolyn M. Parker	October 4, 2007	3T6101	14.20
121	3	"Res Ipsa"	Greg Walker	Greg Walker	October 11, 2007	3T6102	13.62
122	4	"Baggage"	Scott White	Diego Gutierrez & Jan Nash	October 25, 2007	3T6103	12.73
123	5	"Run"	Kate Woods	Jan Nash	November 1, 2007	3T6106	14.58
124	6	"Where and Why"	Jonathan Kaplan	Jan Nash & Greg Walker	November 8, 2007	3T6108	21.69
125	7	"Absalom"	Martha Mitchell	Jose Molina	November 15, 2007	3T6105	14.41
126	8	"Fight/Flight"	Jeannot Szwarc	David H. Goodman	November 22, 2007	3T6107	12.21
127	9	"One Wrong Move"	Jeff T. Thomas	Gwendolyn M. Parker & Diego Gutierrez	December 6, 2007	3T6109	12.68
128	10	"Claus and Effect"	Bobby Roth	Alicia Kirk & David Amann	December 13, 2007	3T6110	15.15
129	11	"4G"	Eric Close	Amanda Segel Marks	January 10, 2008	3T6111	13.83
130	12	"Article 32"	Martha Mitchell	Byron Balasco	January 17, 2008	3T6112	13.29
131	13	"Hard Reset"	John Polson	Jan Nash, David Amann, Greg Walker & José Molina	April 3, 2008	3T6113	15.20
132	14	"A Bend in the Road"	Jonathan Kaplan	Diego Gutierrez & Amanda Segel Marks	April 10, 2008	3T6114	14.49
133	15	"Deja Vu"	Chris Long	Byron Balasco & David Amann	April 24, 2008	3T6115	13.47
134	16	"A Dollar and a Dream"	Martha Mitchell	David H. Goodman & David Mongan	May 1, 2008	3T6116	12.83
135	17	"Driven"	John Polson	Byron Balasco & Gwendolyn M. Parker	May 8, 2008	3T6117	14.67
136	18	"Satellites"	Jonathan Kaplan	Greg Walker & Jan Nash	May 15, 2008	3T6118	14.54

=== Season 7 (2008–09) ===
No. overall	No. in season	Title	Directed by	Written by	Original release date	Prod. code	U.S. viewers (millions)
137	1	"Closure"	John Polson	Jan Nash & Bruce Ramussen	September 23, 2008	3T7204	11.28
138	2	"22 x 42"	Greg Walker	Byron Balasco	September 30, 2008	3T7205	12.61
139	3	"Last Call"	Karen Gaviola	David Amann & Byron Balasco	October 14, 2008	3T7201	11.05
140	4	"True/False"	Martha Mitchell	Diego Gutierrez	October 21, 2008	3T7206	11.63
141	5	"Rise and Fall"	Jonathan Kaplan	David Amann	October 28, 2008	3T7207	12.19
142	6	"Live to Regret"	John F. Showalter	Gwendolyn M. Parker	November 11, 2008	3T7208	12.23
143	7	"Rewind"	Karen Gaviola	Bruce Ramussen	November 18, 2008	3T7209	11.85
144	8	"Better Angels"	Scott White	Jan Nash & Greg Walker	November 25, 2008	3T7210	10.42
145	9	"Push Comes to Shove"	John F. Showalter	Diego Gutierrez & Alicia Kirk	December 2, 2008	3T7202	12.32
146	10	"Cloudy with a Chance of Gettysburg"	Scott White	Story by : Gwendolyn M. Parker & Amanda Segel Marks; Teleplay by : David Amann & Jan Nash	December 16, 2008	3T7203	14.48
147	11	"Wanted"	Marianne Jean-Baptiste	Alicia Kirk	January 6, 2009	3T7211	13.13
148	12	"Believe Me"	Paul McCrane	Jan Nash & Bruce Rasmussen	January 13, 2009	3T7213	12.42
149	13	"Once Lost"	Martha Mitchell	Story by : Diego Gutierrez & Roselyn Sanchez; Teleplay by : Diego Gutierrez & Jim Adler	January 27, 2009	3T7212	13.00
150	14	"Friends and Neighbors"	John F. Showalter	Amanda Segel Marks	February 3, 2009	3T7214	12.16
151	15	"Chameleon"	Eric Close	Byron Balasco	February 10, 2009	3T7215	14.31
152	16	"Skeletons"	Nancy Van Doornewaard	Story by : Diego Gutierrez & Gwendolyn M. Parker; Teleplay by : Diego Gutierrez & Bruce Rasmussen	February 17, 2009	3T7216	12.10
153	17	"Voir Dire"	Jonathan Kaplan	Alicia Kirk	March 17, 2009	3T7217	11.87
154	18	"Daylight"	Jeff T. Thomas	Greg Walker & Jan Nash	March 31, 2009	3T7218	12.53
155	19	"Heartbeats"	Martha Mitchell	Tom Donaghy	April 7, 2009	3T7219	12.15
156	20	"Hard Landing"	Michael Amundson	David Rapp	April 14, 2009	3T7220	13.23
157	21	"Labyrinths"	Jonathan Kaplan	Diego Gutierrez & Gwendolyn M. Parker	April 28, 2009	3T7221	12.21
158	22	"Devotion"	John Polson	Story by : Anthony LaPaglia & Ryan Tavlin; Teleplay by : Byron Balasco & Bruce Ramussen	May 5, 2009	3T7222	11.83
159	23	"True"	Eric Close	Alicia Kirk & Jan Nash	May 12, 2009	3T7223	13.40
160	24	"Undertow"	Jeannot Szwarc	David Amann & Greg Walker	May 19, 2009	3T7224	11.21

== Home media ==
DVD name	Region 1	Region 2	Region 4
The Complete 1st Season	September 14, 2004	January 10, 2005	December 15, 2004
The Complete 2nd Season	March 13, 2007	January 16, 2006	November 16, 2005
The Complete 3rd Season	May 15, 2012	July 24, 2006	May 2, 2007
The Complete 4th Season	September 11, 2012	July 14, 2008	July 1, 2009
The Complete 5th Season	November 27, 2012	February 22, 2010	—N/a
The Complete 6th Season	May 7, 2013	July 5, 2010	—N/a
The Complete 7th and Final Season	April 29, 2014	—N/a	—N/a
