= Ride (1998 film) =

1998 film by Millicent Shelton

- Theatrical release poster
- Directed by: Millicent Shelton
- Written by: Millicent Shelton
- Produced by: Reginald Hudlin; Warrington Hudlin
- Starring: Malik Yoba; Melissa De Sousa; John Witherspoon; Fredro Starr
- Narrated by: Melissa De Sousa
- Cinematography: Frank Byers
- Edited by: Earl Watson
- Music by: Dunn E. Pearson
- Production company: Hudlin Brothers Productions
- Distributed by: Dimension Films
- Release date: March 27, 1998
- Running time: 83 minutes
- Country: United States
- Language: English
- Box office: $5.5 million

Ride is a 1998 American comedy film written and directed by Millicent Shelton. It stars Malik Yoba, Melissa De Sousa, John Witherspoon, and Fredro Starr.

== Plot ==
New York City film school graduate Leta Evans (De Sousa) has just become the assistant to exotic music video director Bleau Kelly (Downtown Julie Brown). She almost loses the job before her first day's barely even started when Bleau decides budget cuts must be made for her next project. When Leta offers to do the assignment for a smaller fee, Bleau decides to have her escort a group of rappers, singers, and showbiz wannabes to Miami for a music video shoot. The gang, which is kept in line by Poppa (Yoba), gets acquainted on a decaying bus as they travel down the East Coast, encountering barroom fights and other problems en route to the music video gig.

== Cast ==
- Malik Yoba as Poppa
- Melissa De Sousa as Leta Evans
- John Witherspoon as Roscoe
- Fredro Starr as 'Geronimo'
- Kellie Shanygne Williams as Tuesday
- Sticky Fingaz as 'Brotha X'
- Cedric the Entertainer as Bo
- Dartanyan Edmonds as 'Byrd'
- Downtown Julie Brown as Bleau Kelly
- Guy Torry as 'Indigo'
- Idalis DeLeón as Charity
- Julia Garrison as Blacke
- The Lady of Rage as 'Peaches'
- Luther Campbell as Freddy 'Freddy B'
- Rueben Asher as Casper
- Snoop Dogg as Mente

== Production ==
Ride was shot between June 1997 and July 1997 in locations across Florida.

== Music ==
A soundtrack containing hip hop music was released on January 27, 1998, by Tommy Boy Records. It contained five charting singles, "The Worst", "Mourn You Til I Join You", "Callin'", "Jam on It" and "The Weekend".

== Reception ==
Lael Loewenstein of Variety magazine describes the film as having "a few genuinely funny bits of dialogue and some earnest performances" that offset the predictable storyline. The review predicts the film will be popular with the target young urban audience, but with only slight chances of a crossover or international audience. Loewenstein states that the script treads familiar road-movie territory, but the film itself is "technically well above average", including the effective costume, production design, and lensing. The acting is also judged to be "adequate all around" with a notable cameo from Snoop Dogg. Entertainment Weekly gives the film a grade of D+, calling it a mess and saying any serious issues raised in the film are immediately undercut by toilet humor, and whenever the road trip story gains momentum it is interrupted by cameo appearances. The New York Times calls Ride "a weak, unenergetic vehicle for character, comedy, romance, adventure or music."

== Home media ==
Buena Vista Home Entertainment (under the Dimension Home Video banner) released Ride on VHS on September 22, 1998, with a LaserDisc release following on October 14, 1998. Buena Vista Home Entertainment later released it on DVD on February 13, 2001.

On October 18, 2011, Echo Bridge reissued Ride on DVD with new artwork. Echo Bridge also included it on a four film DVD set with three other black-focused Miramax comedies (1996's Don't Be a Menace to South Central While Drinking Your Juice in the Hood, 1998's Senseless and 2005's Underclassman). This package was titled "Miramax House Party Collection", and was released on August 7, 2012. Filmyard Holdings terminated their home video agreement with Echo Bridge in 2014, and Lionsgate Home Entertainment reissued the four film set on October 7, 2014. In 2011, Filmyard Holdings licensed the Miramax library to streamer Netflix. This deal included Ride, and ran for five years, eventually ending on June 1, 2016.

Since April 2020, the film has been distributed on digital platforms by Paramount Pictures. On July 27, 2021, Paramount Home Entertainment reissued the film on DVD, with this being one of many Miramax titles that they reissued around this time. This issue uses the same artwork as the 2001 Buena Vista Home Entertainment DVD, but adds the Paramount mountain logo to the packaging like with all of their other Miramax reissues.
