= List of Kingdom (American TV series) episodes =

Kingdom is an American drama television series created by Byron Balasco. The series premiered on October 8, 2014, on the Audience Network and concluded on August 2, 2017. It stars Frank Grillo, Kiele Sanchez, Matt Lauria, Jonathan Tucker, Nick Jonas and Joanna Going. Season one consists of ten episodes. DirecTV renewed the series for a 20-episode second season, 10 of which aired in 2015 and 10 in 2016. On July 7, 2016, it was renewed for a third and final season.

== Series overview ==
Season	Episodes		Originally released	
Season	Episodes		First released	Last released
1	10		October 8, 2014	December 10, 2014
2	20	10	October 14, 2015	December 16, 2015
2	20	10	June 1, 2016	August 3, 2016
3	10		May 31, 2017	August 2, 2017

== Episodes ==
=== Season 1 (2014) ===
No. overall	No. in season	Title	Directed by	Written by	Original release date
1	1	"Set Yourself on Fire"	Adam Davidson	Byron Balasco	October 8, 2014
Alvey Kulina (Frank Grillo) is an ex-MMA fighter and is considered a legend. He and his girlfriend Lisa Prince (Kiele Sanchez) struggle with keeping their gym, Navy St. financially stable, while Alvie's youngest son Nate (Nick Jonas) prepares for an upcoming fight. Nate goes home where he lives with his brother and Alvey's oldest son Jay (Jonathan Tucker), who has a drug and alcohol problem. Jay used to fight but let his addictions get in the way. Meanwhile, Lisa's ex-fiance Ryan Wheeler (Matt Lauria) is released on parole from prison and is sent to a halfway house. He used to be an excellent fighter until he was arrested and imprisoned for four years. Alvey knows how good Ryan is and how having Ryan as a fighter for his gym can earn him good publicity, so he goes to give him a proposition about fighting again, something that Ryan is reluctant on. Nate has his first fight and wins, his opponent is played by Current UFC Featherweight contender Cub Swanson. On his way home from the fight he is jumped by two thugs that Alvey had beat up out of self defense earlier that week. They tell Nate to tell his dad "what's up" and leave his unconscious body in the alley.
2	2	"Glass Eye"	Adam Davidson	Byron Balasco	October 15, 2014
Lisa tells Alvey the reality of the gyms financial situation while he tries to convince her that having Ryan fight at the gym is their solution. Ryan adjusts to life in the halfway house, getting to know Keith (Paul Walter Hauser), his mentally unstable roommate. Jay tells Alvey about his desire to start fighting again but after his drug and alcohol problems and skipping out on fights, Alvey refuses to help him until he sees that Jay is serious about his dedication. The family reels at the news of Nate's attack and Alvey wants answers as to who would do this to his son. Nate says he doesn't remember anything that happened or who jumped him, but that's not the truth. He is left with a huge scar on his head and is left to do physical therapy. He is told that he can start fighting inside six months if everything goes well. Mac (Mac Brandt), Alvey’s HGH supplier, shows up at the gym to train and to also set up Nate with pain killers. When Nate and Jay go home, Jay puts Nate to bed, makes sure he has everything and then takes one of Nate's pills when he's not looking.
3	3	"Piece of Plastic"	Michael Morris	Alex Metcalf	October 22, 2014
Ryan is settling into a new job killing rats that his parole officer set up for him. His roommate Keith tells him when he was 10 years old, his father murdered his mother with a hammer before shooting himself in the backyard. Alvey goes to meet with Ryan's parole officer to try to get him out of killing rats and to get a job at the gym so he can start training. Much to his dismay, Ryan's parole officer declines Alvey's request and says that killing rats is a better job than working at a gym where he might get angry which is what put him in jail in the first place. Nate begins physical therapy with Tatiana (Meaghan Rath), a young physical therapist that is attracted to Nate. Jay goes to visit his mother, Christina (Joanna Going) while she's working as a hooker on the streets. He gives her money and tries to get her to come have dinner with her but she refuses. Lisa bails Jay out of jail and he goes to pay Christina's pimp, Terry (Jamie Harris) a visit. He "buys" his mom for the night, not letting Terry know that he's her son. Jay gives her a phone with his number programmed into a speed dial, and he tells her to call if she ever needs help. By the end of the night, she calls Jay to meet him for lunch. She apologizes for her reaction to him showing up the other night, not wanting him to see her like that. Lisa and Jay agree that she will promote him and try to get him fights if he is serious about fighting again, knowing how good he is as a fighter when he puts his mind to it.
4	4	"Flowers"	Michael Morris	Fernanda Coppel	October 29, 2014
Jay is shopping at a hardware store, picking up wood, a drill, heavy-duty locks and goes home to build a new bedroom door with the locks he purchased. He also puts bars on his bedroom window. Jay then meets his mother for lunch, where she admits that she needs to change her life. Jay offers his place for her to stay out while she figures things out but she declines, to have her stay with him and Nate, she thinks about moving somewhere else to get a clean slate. It’s just an idea she had. When they walk out to his car, he puts Christina in a sleeper hold, ties her hands together and put her in his trunk. He brings her back to his house and places her in the room with the newly acquired door and locks her in there, effectively forcing her into detox. He goes to her apartment to get her some of her clothes and runs into Terry. Jay takes Terry's gun from him, takes off his shirt and beats Terry, also hurting his right hand. Lisa starts making calls to try to get Jay the fight she promised him. She finally gets in touch with Bucky DeMarco (Jamie Kennedy), a promoter who's willing to take a chance on Jay. At the gym, Bucky agrees to put Jay in a fight, but only if it's the welterweight division and he has to make weight in three days.
5	5	"Eat Your Own Cooking"	Gary Fleder	Vladimir Cvetko	November 5, 2014
Alvey has fantasies about revenge for Nate and starts to question how in control he is of his anger. Lisa's father, Ron (Bruce Davison) comes to town and wants to have lunch. Lisa is reluctant as she and her father have a tumultuous relationship but Alvey says he will go with her. At the lunch, her father says that Alvey is too old for Lisa, questions what they would do if she wants to have kids when Alvey doesn't. Nate and Tatiana start sleeping together, but is resistant to letting her get too close, he also blows her off the next night to keep an eye on his mother who is still locked in Jay's room. There is a photographer at the gym to get a look at Navy St., and he was told by Lisa to not get in Ryan's face which is exactly what he does. Ryan starts to get angry and threatens the photographer. Alvey puts Jay in the ring with Ryan, just to see how well they do together and notices that Jay isn't throwing his right hand. Jay's plan is to get through the fight then claim he hurt his hand in the fight, therefore making Bucky pay for it. By the time the fight happens, Jay gets beaten badly in but somehow comes back and gets his opponent in a submission and chokes him unconscious to win the fight. Bucky is notorious for not paying his fighters so Lisa steals a wheel off of Bucky’s car in exchange for the $700 he owes Jay.
6	6	"Please Refrain from Crying"	Gary Fleder	Alex Metcalf	November 12, 2014
Lisa goes with Ryan to visit his parents for the first time since he was released from prison. He goes to seek forgiveness from his dad, who is paralyzed from the neck down due to Ryan getting angry and pushing him, which is the reason he was sent to prison. Back at the halfway house, Michael (Ronnie Gene Blevins) is the bully of the place and likes to consistently pick on and push Keith around. Ryan stands up to him as Keith won't stand up for himself. Jay and Nate finally let Christina out of the room and she tries to find normalcy by spending the day with Nate and making the boys dinner. She also goes with Nate to his physical therapy session only to be told that another therapist will take Tatiana's place because she doesn't feel it appropriate anymore. Jay tells Alvey to come over for dinner, not telling him that Christina, who is still his wife, will be there. With Lisa with Ryan, Alvey is left to give Jay his fight money. He also fills him in on the thugs who beat up Nate. They agree that they won't do anything just so Nate won't worry about them. Alvey also asks for Jay's help on how to get Nate to open up to him. At the dinner, when Christina lets it slip that she went with Nate to his physical therapy, Alvey gets angry and asks to speak with her inside the house. After that have an intense one on one conversation, Alvey leaves and when he gets home, he tells Lisa that Christina is back and living with the boys. At the halfway house, Keith and Ryan are working in the kitchen when Michael enters. After his attempts to pick on Keith don't get a response, he turns to Ryan and asks him how his dad's doing. Instead of getting angry and hitting Michael, Ryan walks away only to see that the butcher's knife is missing. He turns around and before Ryan can stop Keith, Keith is stabbing Michael in the chest. Ryan tackles Keith to the ground and moves the butcher's knife away from Michael and grabs a cleaver from the knife cabinet. He then cuts Keith a few times to make it look like Michael attacked him before putting pressure on Keith's wounds and calling for help.
7	7	"Animator/Annihilator"	Dennie Gordon	Ryan Farley	November 19, 2014
After what happened to Keith, Ryan moves into the gym. Being around Lisa, he confesses his still-present feelings for her. When she rebuffs him, he goes out and gets alcohol to drink by himself when everyone leaves the gym for the night. He gets drunk and starts tearing the gym apart, peeing on the mat and shattering the floor-to-ceiling mirrors. Alvey is alerted by the alarm company that the alarms are going off and he says he'll go down to the gym to take care of it. When he arrives, he finds Ryan a drunk mess and the gym destroyed. Ryan starts saying how Alvey will bend to his will which gets Ryan a head butt from Alvey as a response and the two start to fist fight. They fight before Alvey starts to coach Ryan, telling him to put his left hand on his left cheek before heading outside and calling Garo (Bryan Callen), a good fight promoter, to tell him to set up a press conference for Ryan as he thinks Ryan is ready. Christina wants the bars off her window and she wants to go shopping, which leads to her taking Jay and Nate to a thrift shop. Inside, while Christina and Jay shop, Nate runs into an old boyfriend but tells his mom and brother it's "just a friend". and the boys settle down with their now clean mom. Christina visits Alvey at the gym but meets Lisa first, telling her how gorgeous she is and much younger than she thought. She tells Alvey he should be proud of his gym, and that she's ready for a divorce and to move on. She tells him she doesn't want half and that she wants to be civil about it. Lisa doesn't buy what Christina is saying, but Alvey thinks that Christina is in a place where he can actually talk to her again, so he promises to handle it. When Jay gets home after signing papers for his upcoming fight, he finds the guys who beat up Nate leaving his house with his mom crying inside. He decides to do something to them.
8	8	"The Gentle Slope"	Dennie Gordon	Tom Garrigus	November 26, 2014
Jay searches for Nate's assailants using their license plate number. After he get their address, he goes home to teach Christina how to shoot a gun and then prepares to visit the thugs that night. Ryan, Alvey and Garo goes to the press conference to reintroduce Ryan back into the fighting world. After the conference, Alvey and Christina have dinner to discuss the divorce and the boys. She says that the divorce can be simple, and that she doesn't want to fight. They reminisce about things and when dinner is over, they walk outside. One thing leads to another and they find an alley close by and have sex. Meanwhile, Lisa visits Ryan to return his engagement ring. Ryan admits that his fight with Alvey was about her and how he felt like Alvey stole Lisa from him. Lisa tells him that his fantasy about the two of them being together again won't happen. But he still tells her he's still in love with her, even more so now but she leaves anyway. After the fight, Jay goes to the thugs house, ready to kill them but when he breaks in and finds one of them sleeping, he also finds a small child in bed with him. Instead of killing anyone, he creeps back out of the house and vomits. When Alvey gets home, he and Lisa get into a fight, which ends with hitting him and leaving.
9	9	"Cut Day"	Tim Iacofano	Story by : Ryan Farley; Teleplay by : Ryan Farley & Tom Garrigus	December 3, 2014
Alvey decides to escape away to the Sunset Hawaiian hotel without telling anyone where he's gone. Meanwhile, Jay and Ryan both have to lose a combined 30 pounds in order to make weight. Jay has an easier time losing his 10 pounds than Ryan does trying desperately to lose his 20 pounds. In between frantically working out in sweatpants and trash bags and sitting in the sauna, Nate tells Jay that he's not going to press charges against the thugs who beat him up, with Jay being surprisingly call about it. Lisa is frantically trying to get hold of Alvey who has spent his days getting drunk, tanning and hanging out with the owner of the hotel, (Andre Royo). He finally talks to Lisa, only to tell her that he's OK and he'll be there for the fights. Nate tells Lisa she doesn't deserve that and that they love her, which then gets Ryan to confess to Jay that he's still in love with Lisa. When Ryan's parole officer shows up, he finds out that Ryan has been skipping his job to come to the gym after Alvey paid off the owner to say he's been picking Ryan up for work. In order to not get in trouble and report him for going against his probation officer, his parole officer tells him he's a salipheliac, someone who is turned on by salty thing, especially sweat, and says if Ryan gives him his sweatsuit, he'll keep quiet. Ryan gives him his shirt while his parole officer goes to his car to jack off. Nate is trying to convince Mac to give him some HGH. When Alvey calls Lisa, he asks her if she still loves him and when she doesn't respond, he hangs up.
10	10	"King Beast"	Tim Iacofano	Story by : Tom Garrigus; Teleplay by : Byron Balasco	December 10, 2014
With Ryan's first fight back, everyone is focused on Jay and Ryan. While Jay and Ryan eat a healthy breakfast, Nate secretly injects himself with HGH. He also talks Christina into coming to the fight, if only just to stay in the dressing room. Alvey goes home to talk to Lisa and tells her he'll make things right. Instead, she him that she didn't miss him and he asks if she's going to leave him. She says that she thinks he wants her to and he doesn't respond. At the fight, Jay wins his fight by TKO, and Ryan knocks out his opponent in the 3 round. Lisa goes to Jay's after party and there Ryan asks how he can make her feel better. He kisses her but she pushes him off. Alvey and Christina have a conversation at his house about how the boys see them differently and how Alvey thinks they don't love him. She tells him that they are great boys, so he must have done something right. Alvey tries to advance on her but she tells him that they can't sleep together again. When she leaves, she gets into the car with Terry. When Jay wakes up to find his mother gone but when he gets into the living room, she returns. But the look on her face, he knows where she went. Nate left the after party to go to a club and drink but isn't allowed to enter. He leaves the club with a guy who gives him a blowjob.

=== Season 2 (2015–16) ===
No. overall	No. in season	Title	Directed by	Written by	Original release date
Part 1
11	1	"New Money"	Craig Zisk	Byron Balasco	October 14, 2015
A new and improved Navy St. Gym has a few things brewing: Jay has a fight lined up, and so does Ryan. However, Lisa gets a call and Jay's opponent pulls out, leaving him without a fight. Ryan has his fight, but although he wins, he doesn't perform at his best. He lines up another fight, but his pre-fight drug test comes back positive for cocaine. The promoter, Garo (Bryan Callen) offers to bury the results of the drug test if Ryan signs with him and agrees to fight the next six fights for virtually no money. Meanwhile, Lisa comes across a new fighter - Alicia (Natalie Martinez). Lisa takes her under her wing, and promises to get Alvey to take a look at her and possibly train her at Navy St. Christina gets a job at a burger joint, but gets high in the food storage area with her teenager boss. Alvey spends $5,500 on guns, and Lisa finds out she is pregnant.
12	2	"Simulations"	Craig Zisk	Byron Balasco	October 21, 2015
Alvey's new business venture has him giving a seminar on sales in a hotel conference room. The audience is not huge, but Alvey thinks he can do better and make more money. Jay works out at the beach and notices someone taking pictures of him. Her name is Laura (Jessica Szohr). They talk, go out for drinks to "discuss a modeling gig" but end up having sex. Ryan gets flirty with Alicia, and he also has to go to the police station for yet another interview on the Keith stabbing incident. Keith keeps changing his story every time he talks to the detectives, but Ryan saves the day by pointing out that Keith's best friend is a teddy bear and he has sex with fruits, so he very likely doesn't understand what's going on. Nate seems bored with his girlfriend, and when she gets drunk and passes out, Nate logs on to the gay dating app Grindr. Alvey receives provocative calls and texts, and it's revealed they're a joke from an old friend, Sean Chapas (Mark Consuelos). Sean and Alvey used to fight together back in the day, although they haven't seen each other in years.
13	3	"Broken or Missing"	Michael Morris	Alex Metcalf	October 28, 2015
Keith is released from prison and arrives at Ryan's place. Nate trains for his big fight, and Jay decides to invite Laura along. He is madly in love with her, and wants her to meet his family. Laura, Christina, and Jay share an uncomfortable ride to the fight. The fight begins, and Nate seems to be winning. But he is a kind soul, and he doesn't want to hurt his opponent, so he begins holding back his punches. He has is opponent on the ground and asks the ref to end the fight, but he does not. Nate lets his guard down, and with a single kick to the head, his opponent knocks Nate out, and he loses the fight. Alvey and Christina sign their divorce papers, and when Alvey tells Lisa about this, he asks Lisa if they should get married. Lisa seems indifferent.
14	4	"Be First"	Michael Morris	Bruce Rasmussen	November 4, 2015
Sean Chapas convinces Alvey to invest $30,000 on one of his business ventures. Lisa goes to the doctor and finds out she's having a boy, but she does not share this information with Alvey. Garo Kassabian (Bryan Callen) pitches the idea of a Jay vs. Ryan fight. Alvey is hesitant because no matter who loses, it will be one of his fighters. Eventually Alvey agrees but comes up with a plan. Jay will lose 30 lbs. to drop down to 145 lbs. and then win a belt in that weight class, then fight Ryan. Laura and Christina go buy art supplies, and Christina reveals to Laura her addiction history. Ryan and Alicia train together, flirt, and end up at Ryan's house having sex while Keith overhears. Nate recovers from his concussion, but while he is sleeping Kacey picks up his phone and discovers that Nate has a bunch of pictures of men and dick pics on his phone.
15	5	"Happy Hour"	Gary Fleder	Vladimir Cvetko	November 11, 2015
Alicia finally catches Alvey's eye at the gym, and he begins working with her, training her. Alvey and others begin to see something's amiss when Lisa is at the gym at 6 am and doesn't seem to want to go home late at night. It is later revealed that she's sleeping in her car. Meanwhile, Jay finds out that Laura is still living with her ex, Paul, but only as roommates. Jay is very insecure about this, and asks Alicia for a female's perspective. Alicia tells him no woman is going to live with a man without giving him something in exchange. During a passionate moment, Laura's phone rings with a text alert. Jay loses it, thinking she's receiving texts from Paul. Laura asks Jay to leave. Lisa and Alvey also share a passionate night. The next day, Lisa sets off to find a sponsor for a fight for Nate. However, Nate sets up his own fight with a very shady promoter (Jeff Ross), who arranges for Nate to fight in (Fresno). Ryan spends some time taking care of his wheelchair-using father. They get drunk, and the next day Ryan goes out for a run. When he comes back, his father is covered in his own vomit. Ryan's dad tells Ryan that putting down an injured animal is an act of kindness. Meanwhile, Christina is upset that her check is for a small amount of money, so she goes to a bar, picks up a man, and has sex with him in a hotel room in exchange for money.
16	6	"Pink at Night"	Gary Fleder	Peter Noah	November 18, 2015
Alicia is attacked by two men while sleeping in her car at night, but she fights them off with a knife. Alvey realizes she's been sleeping in her car, and gives her a key to the gym so she can crash there at night. Jay finally gets a shot at a title fight, but he is thrown off when he finds out Laura is spending time with her ex, Paul. He follows Paul but ends up rear-ending his car. Jay approaches Paul and tells him to leave Laura alone. Paul tells Jay that Laura is the kind of woman that doesn't like living in poverty. Later that night, Laura shows up at Jay's house screaming that he is ruining her life. Eventually she tells him they should stop talking, and she leaves. Ryan arranges for Keith to work as his "assistant" at the gym. Alvey reluctantly begins training Nate for his fight in Fresno. During a sparring match, Nate breaks his partner's arm, despite him having tapped out. Alvey loses it and yells at Nate and throws him out of the gym. Alicia reveals to Lisa that she has a 2 year old son, but he is with the father's family in Florida. Christina quits her job. Chapas takes Alvey out to dinner, then to a private club, where he offers him drugs and women. Alvey takes him up on the drugs, but not the women. The two men leave while under the influence, and they are pulled over and arrested for driving under the influence.
17	7	"The Demon Had a Spell"	Michael Morris	Story by : Alex Metcalf; Teleplay by : Byron Balasco	November 25, 2015
Nate and Alvey travel to Fresno for his match. However, things don't go well, as it seems the ref keeps interfering with the fight. Nate receives a brutal beating, and Alvey stops the fight. He calls Lisa and tells her he has realized Nate is not meant to be a fighter. Jay keeps pressuring Christina to find out what she told Laura that drove her away. Christina doesn't admit to anything, and Jay leaves upset. Christina pays Terry a visit, and they have sex in exchange for drugs. Back home, Christina shoots up heroin again. Lisa meets up with her dad, who tells her Alvey's investment is not bad, but it is bad that he did it without telling her. Lisa admits she's not excited about the baby, although she wants to be excited. Her dad says she needs to start taking care of herself, since Alvey isn't doing so. Lisa realizes she needs to move out. Meanwhile, Ryan is filming a promo, and as part of the footage, his dad arrives in his wheelchair to watch him train. In an interview for the camera, Ryan's dad describes how Ryan was a polite boy, and adds that he forgives him for what he did to him. The cameras stop rolling, and Ryan's dad tells him that he meant what he said, and that he's proud of him and loves him.
18	8	"Smoker"	Michael Morris	Bruce Rasmussen	December 2, 2015
Alvey goes to see his therapist, where he admits that he is not going to change. Nate deals with losing his fight by sleeping in until noon, until Jay wakes him up by licking him like a dog. Meanwhile, Ryan is upset that Alvey is spending all his time training Alicia. Jay and Ryan throw a pool party. Casey and Keith are invited. Keith points out that some guests are taking pictures of Ryan as he's about to do cocaine. Ryan throws them out but first tosses their phone into the pool. Casey tells Nate that if he's having sex with men he is gay. Nate admits to having had 2-3 random hookups but is not ready to admit that he's gay, because then no promoter will ever give him a fight. Meanwhile, Lisa makes an appointment to see her doctor due to some cramps. The doctor tells Lisa she should go see a specialist, because it appears the baby is too big. After the party, Jay goes to the Patty Palace, and finds out Christina has not worked there for a while. He realizes she's using again, so he goes home and finds her stash. When Christina comes home, rather than yell at her, Jay tells her he wants her to see what he sees. He shoots up heroine, and a crying Christina tends to him. Alicia's fight night arrives. Right before the fight, she tells Alvey she can't do it. He tells her she needs to do it, or find another gym. Alicia goes out and wins her fight. At the end of the night, Alvey listens to a voicemail from Lisa, where she tells him they're having a boy.
19	9	"Living Down"	Sidney Sidell	Peter Noah	December 9, 2015
Jay and Ryan spend the day in the sauna, trying to make weight. They imagine they are in a much cooler place, eating delicious food. They take a break from this when Alicia receives a car from her sponsors. They get back to the sauna, where Nate joins Jay. Jay tells Nate that if anything ever happened to him, he'd kill himself. Christina looks for an apartment - and finds one - but since she has no credit, no job, and no current residence, she can't get the new apartment. She asks Alvey to co-sign, but he refuses. Ryan gets a call about his dad's kidneys failing, so he rushes over to be with him. Ryan realizes he might not have too much time left with his dad. His dad tells Ryan he will not be able to join in at his next fight, and Ryan tells him he will record the fight so they can watch it together later. Lisa tells Jay that she's moving to San Francisco to be closer to her family, and Jay is sad to see her leave, telling her she's what holds the gym together. Jay and Ryan make weight, and Jay wins his fight, becoming the new King Beast featherweight champion. In his victory speech, Jay thanks Lisa, and Alvey shows how proud he is of his son. Jay calls his mom, but she is lying unconscious from a drug overdose.
20	10	"Traveling Alone"	Sidney Sidell	Byron Balasco	December 16, 2015
It's Ryan's turn to fight. He enters the cage and wins via knockout in the first round. During the fight, Alvey gets a phone call from Chapas. After the fight, they meet up in a seedy motel room. Chapas gives Alvey a bag with the $30,000 he had asked him to invest earlier. When Alvey asks Chapas what he used the money for, Chapas says he invested it to keep his head from getting chopped off. Alvey realizes Chapas is in deep trouble with someone dangerous. As Alvey tries to leave, Chapas grabs his gun and shoots himself in the head. Alvey cleans the gun but leaves it behind, then goes and tells Lisa what happened. Jay and Nate react to their mother's overdose by asking her to go to rehab. Nate tells Christina she needs to get it together because she's destroying Jay. Christina does not want to go to rehab, but Jay tells her she has to go. Now that Lisa is gone, Alvey has a serious talk with Nate about his future. Nate wants to keep fighting, but Alvey tells him that while he's a fighter, he doesn't have that "mental illness" inside of him that would make him a fighter. Nate takes Lisa's place in the gym. Elsewhere, Ryan's dad is so sick that he has to go to a facility. Ryan wakes up in the middle of the night to his dad screaming in pain. He tells Ryan that he needs to put him out of his misery. Ryan sobs on the floor, but then goes and places his dad in a headlock while caressing his hair. He goes through with his dad's wishes and puts him out of his misery.
Part 2
21	11	"Lay and Pray"	Gary Fleder	Byron Balasco	June 1, 2016
Alvey receives news that Lisa lost their baby. In a fit of rage, he trashes his office and punches a trophy case, injuring his hand. He shows up with a bandaged hand to a press conference to promote the Jay vs. Ryan fight. Alvey reveals that he will not be at either fighter's corner. Nate will be at Jay's and Daddy (Joe Stevenson) will be at Ryan's. Ryan lays out his plan for beating Jay, but Jay simply says "Ryan has no weaknesses". Nate hates his semi-management job at the gym, so he picks up a side gig as a personal trainer for an older gentleman, Bob (Paul Ben-Victor). Alicia makes weight for a match of her own, but then Alvey calls and tells her the fight won't happen after all. Alvey visits his friend Degranzo (Andre Royo) and tells him he doesn't feel anything about Lisa having lost the baby. During an interview, Jay is asked about his mother, and he throws the interviewer out of his house. Ryan, still thinking about how he killed his ill father, drinks his sorrows away. He gets too drunk and gets in Jay's face. Ryan wrestles with Nate and hits Mac (Mac Brandt). Ryan messes up his knee during the scuffle.
22	12	"No Fault"	Gary Fleder	Byron Balasco	June 8, 2016
Alicia's sister, Ava (Lina Esco) arrives from Miami, and she and Jay immediately hit it off. They go out, and Ava invites Jay, who is smitten with Ava. Meanwhile, Christina is at rehab, but she is sleeping with the man that runs the program, Jason (Billy Lush). He is married, and tries cutting off the affair, but it continues. In exchange for sex, he allows Christina to break curfew so she can have dinner with Jay. Ryan is laid out with a bad knee, and with the big fight vs. Jay ten days away, it is unclear whether he will be able to fight. Alvey goes to visit Ryan, but as he steps out of his car, he hits a cyclist with his car door. The cyclist breaks his collarbone and Alvey calls an ambulance while Keith looks on. Bob throws a big party and invites Nate. He offers Nate a drink, and a drugged Nate ends up having a threesome with a man and a woman while Bob watches. The next day, Bob's assistant tells Nate that Bob is on his way to London and will not be back for a month. He offers Nate another $10,000 for another month of service, but Nate declines.
23	13	"Woke Up Lonely"	John Dahl	Alex Metcalf	June 15, 2016
Alvey admits to his therapist that he drinks heavily and it's what keeps him alive. Jay and Ryan's fight night is here. Ava sends Jay a picture of her breast for good luck. Nate tries to make sure everything runs smooth for Jay, while Keith stays out of Ryan's way. Ryan is worried that his knee will get in the way of the fight. Alvey gets interrogated again regarding Chapas's death, and then finds out he is being sued by the biker from the crash. At the arena, Alvey hugs both Jay and Ryan, then goes with Alicia to a bar across the street to avoid being at the fight. Alicia asks Alvey who he wants to win, and Alvey avoids that question by saying he's more worried about who will lose. During the fight, Jay focuses on Ryan's leg. Eventually Jay puts Ryan in a hold, and faced with the option of breaking Ryan's arm, Jay chooses to put Ryan to sleep instead. Jay wins the fight and immediately goes to check on Ryan. Alvey and Ryan are worried the press will get wind of the injured leg, and this will take away from Jay's win. Jay celebrates by snorting cocaine in a hotel room with Ava, and they have sex. Alvey leaves Jay a voicemail telling him how proud he is of him. Christina is back at the rehab center. Jason goes to a ceremony and wins an award, then comes back to the rehab center drunk. He tries to force Christina into having sex, but she hits him on the head with the trophy.
24	14	"Do Not Disturb"	John Dahl	Patrick Bison	June 22, 2016
Jay continues to celebrate his win by holing up with Ava, and doing cocaine and having sex. Nate picks up Christina from the rehab center, and she tells Nate she is not pressing charges. When she's alone, she flushes her heroin stash down the toilet. Alvey meets up with his lawyer, Roxy (Wendy Moniz) who advises him to settle. Alvey refuses, and asks her out on a date, to which she agrees. Alicia is approached by some guys who want her to model their activewear. Alvey advises her against it, but she does it anyway. While Alvey is on his date with Roxy, Alicia meets up with these men. They try to persuade her to take off her top. She calls Alvey and he comes to rescue her from the situation. Nate runs into Will (Jonathan Howard), Bob's assistant. He offers Nate the same deal as before for $10,000. Nate agrees, and in the cash stash, Will slips in his card with his number and an invitation to dinner. Ryan agrees to a post-fight interview with Mario. Mario presses Ryan with questions about his knee, but Ryan insists that Jay won the fight because he's a better fighter. Nate shows up at Jay's hotel suite and tells him about Christina. An enraged Jay tries to find out who Christina's assailant is, but she does not tell him. Ava gives Jay a valium pill and pampers him, which makes him very emotional. Alicia doesn't want to stay in the gym alone, so she asks Alvey if she can sleep at his place. Alvey agrees.
25	15	"Take Pills"	Padraic McKinley	Jon Frye	June 29, 2016
Ryan asks Alvey if he will still coach him, and Alvey says he needs time to think it over. When Ryan finds out Alicia is sleeping over at Alvey's, it doesn't sit well with him. Alvey realizes this, and asks Alicia to move out. Garo comes to the gym to meet with Alvey and Ryan. They agree on a rematch between Ryan and Jay, but they are not able to get a hold of Jay who is still holed up with Ava. Eventually he comes out from his suite, and tells Christina he is taking a break from fighting. Christina tells Jay she doesn't think Ava is good for him. Jason comes to Christina's house to apologize to her, but Jay recognizes him as the guy who assaulted her. He ties up Jason and points a gun at him. Jay makes Jason tell him how he hooked up with his mom, and then Jason says he just wants to apologize. Christina talks Jay into letting Jason go. Christina tells Jay he can't keep getting high if he is going to be around her. Nate goes on a date with Will, but Will does most of the talking. In spite of this, Will still wants to go on a second date. Nate says they can possibly do that after his next fight.
26	16	"Halos"	Padraic McKinley	Bruce Rasmussen	July 6, 2016
Jay and Ava descend into darkness as their bender continues. Lisa's father shows up at the gym to talk to Alvey, offering him $200,000 to stay away from Lisa, but the conversation is pushed til after Nate's fight. Mac arrives at Jay's hotel to talk about the fight, but Jay immediately asks him for more drugs. Mac refuses and tells Jay he needs to get it together. Mac gets a staph infection and Alicia, fearful of germs, moves in with Ryan. Keith is very unhappy with this, feeling that Alicia is throwing off his perfect relationship with Ryan. Alvey and Christina talk about Jay and Ava, with Alvey saying that Ava reminds him of Christina. Nate's fight night arrives, and Jay shows up, but is not welcomed by Nate. Right before the match starts, Jay collapses, which throws Nate off. But he shakes it off and wins his fight. There isn't much celebrating, though, as everyone is worried about Jay. Ryan apologizes to Jay about the article, and plans for a rematch move forward. Ryan and Alicia have sex, and Keith stands outside their door and listens.
27	17	"Help Wanted"	Dennie Gordon	Byron Balasco	July 13, 2016
In a flashback, Lisa discovers there is something wrong with the baby while at the orchestra. Back in the current timeline, she reaches out to Alvey. Alvey agrees to the settlement with the biker and pays him $150,000. Back at the gym, Ryan and Alicia compete for time with Alvey. Nate pays Jay a visit at the hotel room, and tells him to get his act together and to go back home. That doesn't happen, and Nate pleads with Jay, telling him that he needs him. Nate returns home alone, but a pensive Jay reflects and decides to clean up his room, go out for a run, and go back home. Meanwhile, Christina decides to help a girl she met at rehab, Chelsea (Chloe Lanier), by allowing her to stay at her place. Alvey and Lisa agree to having Lisa return to the gym, which means Alvey is giving up on the $200,000 from Lisa's father. Alvey meets up with Roxy and tells her about Lisa's return. Then he goes to Lisa and tells her he is seeing someone. Lisa tells him to leave.
28	18	"Cut Man"	Dennie Gordon	Peter Noah	July 20, 2016
Lisa is back in the gym, and Alvey burns the check from her dad. Jay pays her a visit and she questions his current living situation. He comes back by staying she's also living in a hotel room. Lisa begs him to please stick to his training schedule. Keith goes to a hardware store and buys a hammer, then goes and buys a cake for Lisa. He invites everyone at the gym to partake in the cake eating. Alicia asks Jay about Ava, and Jay tells her she's not coming out of the hotel room much. Alicia goes to look for Ava and they argue, with Ava bringing up the fact that Alicia's baby was taken away from her because she is such a screw up. Things get physical, and Ava smashes a beer bottle on Alicia's head, cutting her. Alicia is worried she won't be able to fight. But she does, and although she bleeds profusely from her head, she wins her fight by TKO. Chelsea overstays her stay with Christina, inviting some people over for a party. Christina throws them out, but two of them plus Chelsea return later. They tie up Christina and rob her, taking Nate's secret cash stash. Jay finds Will's card in Nate's room, and calls the number in it. He is shocked when the voice on the other side is a man's voice.
29	19	"Late to Leave"	Byron Balasco	Byron Balasco	July 27, 2016
Jay returns back to his normal life, leaving Ava alone in the hotel room. Desperate for drugs, she approaches a creepy guy staying in the hotel and asks for cocaine. Ryan leaves for a run in the morning, and leaves Alicia sleeping in his bed. Keith grabs the hammer he just bought, and sneaks into the bedroom. He contemplates using it on Alicia, but changes his mind and she wakes up. Instead, Keith smashes his hand with the hammer on purpose. Back at the gym, Alicia gets an offer from a promoter. Ryan tells her she should talk to Alvey about leaving the gym, but then he goes and tells Alvey first. By the time Alicia comes to talk to Alvey, he already knows, and he tells her she can go and his gym door is always open. Jay gets into Nate's phone and texts Will, making a date with him for drinks. Jay meets up with Lisa in the same bar, and he tells her he has nothing in spite of being a world champion. When Lisa leaves, Jay approaches Will and confirms that he is the man that's waiting for Nate (Will does not realize it was Jay who texted him from Nate's phone). When Nate doesn't show up, Will leaves. Later he calls Nate and tells him he doesn't play games, and to lose his number. A confused Nate doesn't know what's going on, until Will shows him their text conversation. Alvey is having an intimate moment with Roxy, when a drunk Lisa arrives. She insists on seeing Alvey's new woman. Roxy leaves, and Lisa asks Alvey why he never came to look for her when she left. Alvey says it was because he was respecting Lisa's dad's wishes, which enrages her. Jay returns back to the motel and finds out that Ava is dead. The guy she asked cocaine from is a convicted murderer and rapist who was just released from jail. When Ava talked to him, he made sexual advances at her and she turned him down. He responded by stabbing her and throwing her body into the empty pool. Alicia and Ryan arrive after Jay. Alicia is mad at Jay, and he cries heartbroken.
30	20	"No Sharp Objects"	Byron Balasco	Byron Balasco	August 3, 2016
Alvey goes to the police station to get his gun, and ends up leaving with Chapas's ashes in a box as well. Roxy stops by the gym and breaks up with Alvey, saying it shouldn't be this hard to be in a relationship. Jay shows up late to the weigh-in, and is 5 lbs. under weight. Prior to the Jay-Ryan fight, Nate talks to Jay and tells him he is not ready to fight Ryan. Jay says he is going through some emotional shit, and asks Nate to leave. Jay and Ryan's fight #2 happens, and Ryan wins by knockout in the fourth round. Alvey, who was coaching Ryan and on his corner during the fight, tells him to enjoy his win. Jay goes to the hospital for his injuries after the fight, and Nate and Christina come along. Christina tells Nate to go pick up Jay's things at the hotel room. He does, and he finds Will's card among Jay's things, realizing Jay knows he is gay. Christina reads an apology letter to Jay. Nate comes back and talks to Jay. Jay tells him he loves him no matter what. After the match, Ryan invites Lisa to a drink because he has nowhere to go. He opens up to her about his father's death, and she does the same about losing her baby. They kiss. At the gym, Alvey has Chapas's ashes and pours some on the ring canvas. He contemplates honoring his dead friend, then changes his mind. He scoops the ashes back into the box, and then throws the box into a dumpster.

=== Season 3 (2017) ===
No. overall	No. in season	Title	Directed by	Written by	Original release date
31	1	"Wolf Tickets"	Sidney Sidell	Byron Balasco	May 31, 2017
32	2	"Ritual"	Sidney Sidell	Byron Balasco	June 7, 2017
33	3	"Thank You, Boys"	Michael Morris	Byron Balasco	June 14, 2017
34	4	"Headhunter"	Michael Morris	Byron Balasco	June 21, 2017
35	5	"Please Give"	Adam Davidson	Enzo Mileti & Scott Wilson	June 28, 2017
36	6	"All Talk"	Adam Davidson	Jennifer Ames & Steve Turner	July 5, 2017
37	7	"Platinum Level"	Michael Morris	Jon Frye	July 12, 2017
38	8	"Old Pueblo"	Michael Morris	Byron Balasco	July 19, 2017
39	9	"Cactus"	Padraic McKinley	Byron Balasco	July 26, 2017
40	10	"Lie Down in the Light"	Padraic McKinley	Byron Balasco	August 2, 2017
