= Damon (TV series) =

- Genre: Sitcom
- Created by: Leo Benvenuti; Steve Rudnick; Damon Wayans
- Starring: Damon Wayans; David Alan Grier; Andrea Martin; Dom Irrera; Melissa De Sousa; Julio Oscar Mechoso; Greg Pitts
- Country of origin: United States
- Original language: English
- No. of seasons: 1
- No. of episodes: 13

Production
- Executive producers: Steve Rudnick; Leo Benvenuti; Marcy Carsey; Caryn Mandabach; Tom Werner; Damon Wayans; Dick Blasucci; John Whitesell
- Producers: Sam Henry Kass; Brenda Hanes-Berg
- Camera setup: Multi-camera
- Running time: 30 minutes
- Production companies: Nu Systems Productions; Carsey-Werner Productions

Original release
- Network: Fox
- Release: March 22 – July 20, 1998

Damon is an American television sitcom starring Damon Wayans that ran for thirteen episodes on Fox in 1998. It was created by Leo Benvenuti, Steve Rudnick and Damon Wayans and directed by John P. Whitesell.

The series received negative reviews from critics, who praised Wayans' comedic work but criticized the show's writing and overly crass humor.

== Synopsis ==
When two brothers, an undercover cop and home security officer, are reunited in Chicago, their professional and family lives create a series of situations.

== Cast ==
- Damon Wayans as Damon Thomas, a clever but politically incorrect undercover cop that has quick wit, beautiful women and a challenging job.
- David Alan Grier as Bernard Thomas, a rent-a-cop home security officer who longs to be the real thing.
- Andrea Martin as Captain Carol Czynencko, Damon's hard-as-nails boss who is trying to get in touch with her sensitive side.
- Dom Irrera as Carrol Fontain, a hypochondriac who makes his co-workers cringe with graphic descriptions of his problems
- Melissa De Sousa as Stacy Phillips, a strong career-driven Latina who has a "no dating cops" rule.
- Julio Oscar Mechoso as Jimmy Tortone, a Cuban con-artist who walks a fine line between shady and legit
- Greg Pitts as Billy McCarthy, a gung-ho, gullible new kid in the department who falls prey to everyone's practical jokes.

=== Recurring Actors ===
- Veronica Webb as Tracy Warren
- Nellie Sciutto as Gloria

== Episodes ==
No.	Title	Directed by	Written by	Original release date
1	"Pilot"	John Whitesell	Leo Benvenuti & Steve Rudnick & Damon Wayans	March 22, 1998
2	"The Exam"	John Whitesell	Brad Kaaya & Tim Hightower	March 29, 1998
3	"Under Covers"	John Whitesell	Mike Barker & Matthew Weitzman	April 5, 1998
4	"The Apartment"	John Whitesell	Bernadette Luckett	April 6, 1998
5	"Chasing Tracy"	John Whitesell	Judith McCreary & Devon Shepard	April 13, 1998
6	"House Warming"	John Whitesell	Brad Kaaya & Tim Hightower	April 20, 1998
7	"The Test"	John Whitesell	J.J. Paulsen & Nick LeRose	April 27, 1998
8	"My Brother's So-Called Life"	John Whitesell	Dick Blasucci & Devon Shepard	May 4, 1998
9	"The Actor"	John Whitesell	Bernadette Luckett	May 11, 1998
10	"The Designer"	John Whitesell	Dick Blasucci	May 18, 1998
11	"The White Guy"	John Whitesell	Leo Benvenuti & Steve Rudnick & Damon Wayans	June 22, 1998
12	"A Bury Special Episode"	John Whitesell	Matt Weitzman & Mike Barker	July 13, 1998
13	"The Last Cub Scout"	John Whitesell	Nick LeRose & J.J. Paulsen	July 20, 1998

== Development ==
Wayans signed a deal with Fox to create two shows for the network. Following the launch and cancellation of his first show, the hour-long drama 413 Hope St., he began working on a half-hour sitcom. Damon, then untitled, was announced in January 1998. The title and premiere date of the show was revealed in February.

== Broadcast ==
Damon premiered on Fox on March 22, 1998. The series aired on Sundays at 8:30 PM for its first three weeks, before pivoting to Mondays at 8:00 PM on April 6.

== Reception ==
=== Critical response ===
Bruce Fetts of Entertainment Weekly described the show as "the crassest sitcom in history" and said that the "lowlights are too numerous to list". The Standard-Times described Wayans as "brilliant" but the overall show as "amateurish". Similarly, Rick Lyman of The New York Times lauded Wayan's caricature work, but criticized the show's writing. The Hartford Courant praised the cast's "substantial talents", specifically the dynamic between Wayans and Grier, but criticized the show as "lowbrow" and "raucous".

=== Accolades ===
Award	Year	Category	Nominated work	Result	Ref.
NAACP Image Awards	1999	Outstanding Supporting Actor in a Comedy Series	David Alan Grier	Nominated	
