= Constellation (film) =

- Poster for Constellation
- Directed by: Jordan Walker-Pearlman
- Written by: Jordan Walker-Pearlman
- Produced by: Jordan Walker-Pearlman
- Starring: Ever Carradine; David Clennon; Rae Dawn Chong; Melissa De Sousa; Hill Harper; Alec Newman; Zoe Saldana; Billy Dee Williams; Lesley Anne Warren; Gabrielle Union; Clarence Williams III
- Cinematography: John Niaga Demps
- Edited by: Alison Learned
- Music by: Michael Bearden; Stefan Dickerson; Stanley A. Smith
- Distributed by: Codeblack Entertainment; 20th Century Fox
- Release dates: February 16, 2005 (Pan African Film Festival); February 2, 2007 (United States)
- Running time: 105 minutes
- Country: United States
- Language: English

Constellation is a drama film that was released by Codeblack Entertainment and 20th Century Fox in 2007. It had its French premiere in Cannes, and in Britain premiered as a special screening at the American embassy in London.

== Plot ==
Returning to Huntsville, Alabama—a town that once held back their opportunities—the Boxer family and its extended members discover in the memory of a loved one what binds them together.

When the beloved Carmel Boxer passes away, her entire family returns to the Deep South to celebrate her life and legacy. As the Boxer family comes together for the first time in many years, revelations of Carmel's painful past begin to force each person to address their pent-up emotions and true feelings for one another. The story chronicles the lives and loves of this African-American family as its members are forced to come to terms with a tumultuous past marked by an unrequited interracial affair. The film explores the way in which the family patriarch, Helms Boxer, must confront his demons amid the changing racial fabric of society and his own family.

== Cast ==
- Gabrielle Union as Carmel Boxer
- Billy Dee Williams as Helms Boxer, an artist based in Paris, France
- Zoe Saldana as Rosa Boxer, Helms' daughter
- Hill Harper as Errol Hickman, Rosa's ex-boyfriend
- Melissa De Sousa as Lucy Boxer, Helms' daughter
- Lesley Ann Warren as Nancy, Lucy's mother; Helms' ex-wife
- Rae Dawn Chong as Jenita, Rosa's mother
- Daniel Bess as Young Bear Korngold
- David Clennon as Older Bear Korngold, Carmel's childhood love
- Ever Carradine as Celeste Korngold, Bear's niece
- Alec Newman as Kent Seras

== Production ==
Constellation was filmed entirely on location in Huntsville, Alabama.

== Reception ==
As of October 2026, the film holds a 0% approval rating on Rotten Tomatoes, based on 19 reviews with an average rating of 3.8/10. The site's critics consensus states "Though earnestly directed, Constellation lacks dramatic fireworks and eventually falls into TV-movie sentimentality."

However, the Los Angeles Times said in its review that the film was "highly entertaining and emotional," and that "Walker-Pearlman is adept at revealing the effect these people and others have on each other, especially on Helms, played with depth and restraint by Williams." The film won Best Independent Film of the Year at the Black Reel Awards from the Foundation for the Advancement of African-Americans in Film, made up largely of African-American film critics.

== See also ==
- List of films with a 0% rating on Rotten Tomatoes
