= Michole Briana White =

American actress

- Occupation: Actress
- Years active: 1991–present

Michole Briana White is an American actress. She began her career while appearing on numerous of television sitcoms before portraying Lucille Flenory on the Starz' crime series Black Mafia Family (since 2020). White also appeared in many films throughout her career including Out of Darkness (1994 TV Movie), Courage Under Fire (1996), Volcano and Convict 762 (both in 1997), She Hate Me and The Break-Up Artist, (both in 2004), Into the Fire (2005 TV Movie), The Strange Eyes of Dr. Myes & Lila & Eve (both in 2015), Spell (2018), and The Fight That Never Ends (2021 TV Movie).

== Life and career ==
White is known for her role as attorney Fatima Kelly in the A&E series 100 Centre Street. She has also guest starred in a number of notable television series namely L.A. Law, The Wonder Years, The Fresh Prince of Bel-Air, Family Matters, Blossom, Martin, Living Single, Ellen, Chicago Hope, Law & Order: Special Victims Unit and among other series. She also had regular role in the WB sitcom Muscle in 1995.

White has also co starred in the films Encino Man (1992), Courage Under Fire (1996), Volcano (1997), the Spike Lee films 25th Hour (2002) and She Hate Me (2004), and the 2010 film Faster.

In 2009, she co-starred in the traveling stage production Stick Fly.

== Filmography ==
=== Film ===
Year	Title	Role	Notes
1992	Something to Live for: The Alison Gertz Story	School Girl	TV movie
1992	Final Shot: The Hank Gathers Story	Taffy	TV movie
1992	Encino Man	Kathleen	
1994	Out of Darkness	Lisa	TV movie
1994	Everybody Can Float	Young Mom #1	Short
1996	Courage Under Fire	Maria	
1997	Volcano	E.R. Nurse #1	
1997	Convict 762	Austin	
2000	Vacant Lot	Lark Medley	
2002	25th Hour	Coventry Administrator	
2004	She Hate Me	Nadiyah	
2004	Copshop	Deborah Ganier	TV movie
2004	The Break-Up Artist	Frankie	
2005	Into the Fire	Patty	TV movie
2010	I Will Follow	Fran	
2010	Faster	TV Anchor #2	
2014	Deluge	Older Tiana	Short
2014	Only Light	Claire	Short
2015	The Strange Eyes of Dr. Myes	Dr. Sheri Myes	
2015	Lila & Eve	Mae	
2015	Lalaloopsy: Band Together	Voice	Video
2018	Hindsight	Dee	Short
2018	Spell	Gayle	
2019	Laying Out	Maggie	Short
2020	Songbird	Alice	
2021	I Like Tomorrow	Captain Regina Lamb	Short
2021	Malignant	Regina Moss	
2021	The Fight That Never Ends	Pat	TV movie
2022	Six Feet	Sheriff Dalton	
2023	The Allnighter	Miriam	
2023	Baby Blue	Dr. Barrett	

=== Television ===
Year	Title	Role	Notes
1991	L.A. Law	Tasha Johnson	Episode: "Do the Spike Thing"
1992	The Wonder Years	Cynthia	Episode: "Scenes from a Wedding"
1992	The Fresh Prince of Bel-Air	Lisa/Lindsey Simon	Guest Cast: Season 2-3
1993	Family Matters	Melissa	Episode: "Muskrat Love"
1993-94	The Sinbad Show	Roxanne	Recurring Cast
1994	CBS Schoolbreak Special	Terri	Episode: "Love in the Dark Ages"
1994	Blossom	Robin	Episode: "Blue Blossom"
1994-97	Living Single	Olivia Jones	Guest Cast: Season 2 & 4
1995	Muscle	Angela	Main Cast
1995	Martin	Thelma	Episode: "Uptown Friday Night"
1996	Ellen	Alyssa	Episode: "Two Mammograms and a Wedding"
1996-97	The Parent 'Hood	Karen	Recurring Cast: Season 3
1997	Lois & Clark: The New Adventures of Superman	Doris	Episode: "AKA Superman"
1997	Built to Last	Olivia	Episode: "A Family Affair"
1998	Chicago Hope	Alyson Griffin	Episode: "The Tides That Bind"
1998	Getting Personal	Janine	Episode: "Sam I Am"
2001-02	100 Centre Street	Fatima Kelly	Recurring Cast
2002	Third Watch	Mrs. Thomas	Episode: "To Protect..."
2004	Law & Order: Special Victims Unit	Tamara Semple	Episode: "Careless"
2005	Numbers	Agent Ramos	Episode: "Counterfeit Reality"
2005	Threshold	Cindy	Episode: "Progeny"
2009	Lie to Me	Merrick	Episode: "Truth or Consequences"
2010	Medium	Dr. Cheryl Kung	Episode: "Psych"
2014	Fishbowls Are Definitely My Thing	Ricky's Mother	Episode: "Episode #1.3"
2014	Love That Girl!	Bridget	Recurring Cast: Season 4
2015	Reed Between the Lines	Simone Winters	Main Cast: Season 2
2016	The Kicks	Club Coach	Episode: "There's No I in Team"
2017	Grey's Anatomy	Hillary	Episode: "It Only Gets Much Worse"
2018	The Quad	Michole	Episode: "#NativeSon"
2018	Room 104	Officer Pankin	Episode: "Hungry"
2020-22	Dead to Me	Teri	Guest Cast: Season 2-3
2021	Goliath	A.G. Herrera	Recurring Cast: Season 4
2021- Present	BMF	Lucille Flenory	Main Cast
2022	FBI: International	Helen McCree	Episode: "One Kind of Madman"
2022	Atlanta	Jeanie	Episode: "Light Skinned-ed"
2022	Beyond the Dark	Sgt. Badgetaker	Episode: "The Speed of Time"
2025	Ballard	Naomie Bennett	Episode: "9"
2026	Beef	Janet	3 episodes

== Awards and nominations ==
Year	Result	Award	Category	Work
2000	Won	Obie Award	Excellence of Ensemble Performance	Jitney
2000	Won	Drama Desk Award	Outstanding Ensemble Performance	Jitney
