= Reed Between the Lines =

2011–2015 American sitcom TV series

- Genre: Sitcom
- Created by: Kellie Griffin
- Starring: Tracee Ellis Ross; Malcolm-Jamal Warner; Nadji A. Jeter; Zoë Soul; Zoé Hendrix; Melissa De Sousa; Anna Maria Horsford; Michole Briana White; Tony Rock; Charlie Robinson
- Music by: Marcus Miller
- Country of origin: United States
- Original language: English
- No. of seasons: 2
- No. of episodes: 33 (list of episodes)

Production
- Executive producers: Arthur Harris; Jacque Edmonds Cofer; Kellie Griffin; Warren Hutcherson
- Producers: Malcolm-Jamal Warner; Tracee Ellis Ross
- Camera setup: Multi-camera
- Running time: 30 minutes
- Production company: Georgia Entertainment Industries

Original release
- Network: BET (season 1); Centric (season 2)
- Release: October 11, 2011 – October 9, 2015

Reed Between the Lines is an American television family sitcom that premiered on October 11, 2011, on BET. The series was renewed for a second season on April 12, 2012. It was later announced in August 2012 that Tracee Ellis Ross would not return for the second season and three new cast members (Charlie Robinson, Michole White, and Tony Rock) would be joining the cast. On September 12, 2013, it was revealed that Reed Between the Lines had been canceled and that Young Man on Campus would not be green-lit to series. Malcolm Jamal-Warner confirmed in December 2013 that the second season will not air despite the network completing production on an entire second season in late 2012. The series moved to Centric for a second season which premiered on September 18, 2015.

== Premise ==
The show follows a modern-day blended family as they navigate life's ups and downs with wit and humor. It centers on Dr. Carla Reed, a busy psychologist, wife and mom struggling to balance her job and her happy but chaotic home life along with her husband, Dr. Alex Reed, an English professor at NYU.

== Cast ==
- Tracee Ellis Ross as Dr. Carla Reed (season 1), a successful psychologist who works hard to balance her family and career. She grew up in a solid, middle-class family that valued stability and education, but her perfect world fell apart while she was in college at Howard University, when she found out her father had a secret family. Recently, she has left the kids in Alex's care and relocates to Los Angeles in efforts to pursue her dream job.
- Malcolm-Jamal Warner as Dr. Alex Reed, an English professor at NYU specializing in twentieth-century American literature. Alex is a neat freak who loves sports, cooking and fine wines. Born and raised in Newark, New Jersey, he was the first of his blue-collar family to go to college.
- Nadji A. Jeter as Keenan Reynolds, Kaci's fraternal twin and older by two minutes, a fact that he loves to rub in her face. Keenan likes video games, music and hanging out with his friends. But most of all, he likes to push Kaci's buttons and tease Alexis.
- Zoë Soul as Kaci Reynolds, Keenan's fraternal twin. She loves boys, and talking with her friends. She's also an excellent natural athlete who participates in a number of school activities and is interested in environmental causes. She makes sure Carla and Alex keep their home "green", and is frequently outraged by her family's increasing carbon footprint and wasting resources. She also hates "family time" or anything that involves Keenan.
- Zoé Hendrix as Alexis Reed
- Melissa De Sousa as Gabriella Jimenez (season 1)
- Anna Maria Horsford as Ms. Helen Wilson (season 1; guest season 2)
- Michole White as Simone Winters (season 2)
- Tony Rock as Julius Darren (season 2)
- Charlie Robinson as Monroe Reed (season 2)

== Episodes ==
Season	Episodes	Originally released	
Season	Episodes	First released	Last released
1	25	October 11, 2011	December 20, 2011
2	8	September 18, 2015	October 9, 2015

== Young Man on Campus ==
Young Man on Campus is a pilot ordered by BET that was to be a spin-off of Reed Between the Lines. It starred Jacob Latimore who is cast in the lead role as Jacob Matthews — a precocious 15-year-old who's a sophomore in physics at the fictional historically black college Mount Pleasant University. Dondre Whitfield, Vanessa Simmons, Eric D. Hill Jr, and Terri Vaughn were also a part of the cast.
