= Melissa De Sousa =

American actress (born 1967)

- Born: September 25, 1967 (age 59)
- Occupation: Actress
- Years active: 1992–present

Melissa De Sousa (born September 25, 1967) is an American actress. She made her big screen debut playing the leading role in the 1998 comedy film Ride. She starred as Shelby in the 1999 romantic comedy-drama film The Best Man and later reprised her role in its 2013 sequel The Best Man Holiday and the 2022 Peacock series The Best Man: The Final Chapters.

== Early life ==
A Panamanian, Melissa De Sousa attended the High School of Performing Arts as a ballet major, and began her career as a principal dancer with The Alvin Ailey American Dance Company before transitioning into acting.

== Career ==
De Sousa made her television debut appearing in an episode of television drama series The Trials of Rosie O'Neill in 1992 and later that year starred in CBS Schoolbreak Special episode "Words Up!". She later made guest-starring appearances on Living Single, Getting By, Silk Stalkings, The Sinbad Show, Married... with Children, ER and The Wayans Bros.. In 1994, De Sousa portrayed drug-addicted actress Neely O'Hara in the syndicated soap opera Valley of the Dolls based on Jacqueline Susann's 1966 novel Valley of the Dolls. In 1998, she starred opposite Damon Wayans in the short-lived Fox sitcom Damon, and made her big screen debut playing the female leading role in the comedy film Ride. The film received mixed reviews from critics.

In 1999, De Sousa starred as Shelby in the comedy-drama film The Best Man receiving NAACP Image Award for Outstanding Supporting Actress in a Motion Picture nomination for her performance. The film received positive reviews from critics. The following year she appeared in the action comedy film Miss Congeniality, and the prison drama film Lockdown. In 2001, she starred in the independent comedy film 30 Years to Life. On television, she was regular cast member in the Fox drama series, The Street, the UPN sitcom Second Time Around (2004–2005), and the BET sitcom Reed Between the Lines (2011). She also had recurring roles in the UPN sitcom One on One from 2002 to 2003, and the VH1 comedy-drama Single Ladies in 2015. In 2006, De Sousa starred opposite Matthew Perry in the TNT original movie The Ron Clark Story, which garnered an Emmy nomination for Outstanding Made for Television Movie. She guest-starred on Castle, Shameless, Criminal Minds and Elementary.

In 2013, De Sousa reprised her role as Shelby in the comedy-drama film The Best Man Holiday. It was a commercial success, grossing $72.8 million worldwide on a production budget of $17 million, and received positive reviews from critics. In 2018, she played the leading role in the Urban Movie Channel comedy-drama series, Ladies of the Law. The following year she had recurring role as Mirta Herrera in the Showtime comedy series On Becoming a God in Central Florida. In 2021, De Sousa had a recurring role in the final season of CW superhero series Black Lightning as Police Chief Ana Lopez. Later that year, she joined the cast of Fox prime-time soap opera, Our Kind of People. In 2022, she reprised her role as Shelby in the comedy-drama miniseries The Best Man: The Final Chapters which streamed on Peacock.

== Filmography ==
=== Film ===
Year	Title	Role	Notes
1996	Spark	Nina	Short
1998	Ride	Leta	
1999	The Best Man	Shelby	
2000	Lockdown	Krista	
2000	Miss Congeniality	Karen Krantz, Miss New York	
2001	30 Years to Life	Natalie	
2001	I Shaved My Legs For This	Melissa	
2002	Laurel Canyon	Claudia	
2003	Biker Boyz	Sheila	
2005	Constellation	Lucy Boxer-Seras	
2006	The Ron Clark Story	Marissa Vega	TV movie
2006	Saturday Night Life	Darlene Maye	Short
2007	Bats: Human Harvest	Lieutenant O'Neal	TV movie
2008	A Good Man Is Hard To Find	Monica	Video
2008	Danny Fricke	Erika Valdez	TV movie
2009	The Killing of Wendy	Angie	
2010	The Bannen Way	Catalina	
2010	Ashes	Camille	
2012	She Is Not My Sister	Stacey	
2013	The Best Man Holiday	Shelby	
2014	C.R.U.	Michelle Hughes	
2015	Supermodel	Detective Lacey	
2017	Haters	Graciela	Short
2026	A Proud Family Wizmas	Sunset Boulevardez	

=== Television ===
Year	Title	Role	Notes
1992	The Trials of Rosie O'Neill	Cricket	Episode: "Sweet Sixteen"
1992	CBS Schoolbreak Special	Melissa Skyler	Episode: "Words Up!"
1993	Getting By	Randee	Episode: "Do the Fright Thing"
1993	Silk Stalkings	Ellie Rose	Episode: "Tough Love"
1993	Living Single	Lisa	Episode: "In the Black Is Beautiful"
1994	The Sinbad Show	Actress	Episode: "David Goes Skiing
1994	Valley of the Dolls	Neely O'Hara	Main cast
1994	Living Single	Carmen	Episode: "Who's the Boss?"
1995	Simon	Brenda	Episode: "Simon Hunts a Rat"
1996	Married... with Children	Jaclyn	Episode: "The Hood, the Bud & the Kelly: Part 1 & 2"
1996	ER	Estella	Episode: "Baby Shower"
1997	The Wayans Bros.	Charmaine	Episode: "I Do..."
1997	Moesha	Jennifer	Episode: "Age Ain't Nothing But a Number"
1998	Damon	Stacy Phillips	Main cast
1999	Grown Ups	Donna	Recurring cast
2000–2001	The $treet	Donna Pasqua	Main cast
2002–2003	One on One	Natalie Odessa	Recurring cast: Seasons 2–3
2004–2005	Second Time Around	Coco Herrera	Main cast
2006	Ghost Whisperer	Christine Nelson	Episode: "The Ghost Within"
2009	CHICK: Within Me Lives a Superhero	Wildfire	Episode: "Episode #1.1 & #1.5"
2010	Castle	Liz Penn	Episode: "A Deadly Game"
2011	Reed Between the Lines	Gabriella Jimenez	Main cast: Season 1
2013	Shameless	Tina	Episode: "May I Trim Your Hedges?"
2015	Single Ladies	Austin Aguilera	Main cast: Season 4
2017	Family Time	Shauna	Episode: "College Bound"
2018	Criminal Minds	Adele McCord	Episode: "Bad Moon on the Rise"
2018	Elementary	Luz Horowitz	Episode: "The Visions of Norman P. Horowitz"
2018	Ladies of the Law	Tina	Main cast
2019	On Becoming a God in Central Florida	Mirta Herrera	Recurring cast
2021	Black Lightning	Ana Lopez	Recurring cast: Season 4
2021	Our Kind of People	Alex Rivera	Recurring cast
2022	The Best Man: The Final Chapters	Shelby Taylor	Main cast
2024	Bel-Air	Steph	Episode: "Out All Night"
2025–2026	The Proud Family: Louder and Prouder	Sunset Boulevardez	Replacing Maria Canals-Barrera

== Accolades ==
Year	Awards	Category	Recipient	Outcome
2000	NAACP Image Awards	NAACP Image Award for Outstanding Supporting Actress in a Motion Picture	The Best Man	Nominated
2003	Black Reel Awards	Black Reel Award for Outstanding Independent Film Actress	30 Years to Life	Nominated
2014	American Black Film Festival	Acapulco Black Film Festival for Best Ensemble Cast	The Best Man Holiday	Won
2015	American Black Film Festival	American Black Film Festival Award for Best Actress	C.R.U.	Nominated

== See also ==
- List of Afro-Latinos
