= Byron Balasco =

American television producer and screenwriter

- Occupations: Television producer, screenwriter
- Years active: 2006–present
- Known for: Without a Trace; Kingdom]]NCIS: New York"

Byron Balasco is an American television producer and screenwriter. He has written and produced for the shows Without a Trace (2006–2009), FlashForward (2010), and Detroit 1-8-7 (2010–2011). In 2014, he signed on to executive produce and write for the series he created Kingdom featuring Frank Grillo. NCIS New York

== Career ==
Balasco was the writer and co-producer for several episodes on the television series Huff in 2006. From 2006 to 2009, he worked as supervising producer, co-producer, producer and writer for the series Without a Trace. In 2010, he co-executive produced the series FlashForward, Happy Town and Detroit 1-8-7.

He wrote the pilot for the 2013 series Westside produced by McG. This was Balasco's first series as a creator where he also served as executive producer. The show was never picked up.

In 2014, Balasco signed on as executive producer and writer for the DirecTV series he created titled Kingdom starring Frank Grillo and Jonathan Tucker.

== Filmography ==
=== As producer ===
Year	Title	Notes
2006	Huff	Co-producer (3 episodes)
2006–2009	Without a Trace	62 episodes–supervising producer (24 episodes), co-producer (20 episodes), producer (18 episodes)
2010	FlashForward	Co-executive producer (12 episodes)
2010	Happy Town	Co-executive producer (6 episodes)
2010–2011	Detroit 1-8-7	Co-executive producer (17 episodes)
2013	Westside	Executive producer
2014-2017	Kingdom	Executive producer (9 episodes)
2026-present	NCIS: New York	Executive producer (8 Episodes)

=== As writer ===
Year	Title	Notes
2005–2006	Huff	4 episodes
2006–2009	Without a Trace	12 episodes
2010	FlashForward	2 episodes
2010	Happy Town	1 episode: "Questions and Antlers"
2010–2011	Detroit 1-8-7	2 episodes
2013	Westside	Also creator
2014–2017	Kingdom	3 episodes; also creator (10 episodes)
2026	NCIS: New York	4 episodes; also creator (11 Episodes)
