= My Policeman (film) =

2022 film by Michael Grandage

- Official promotional poster
- Directed by: Michael Grandage
- Screenplay by: Ron Nyswaner
- Based on: My Policeman by Bethan Roberts
- Produced by: Greg Berlanti; Philip Herd; Cora Palfrey; Robbie Rogers; Sarah Schechter
- Starring: Harry Styles; Emma Corrin; Gina McKee; Linus Roache; David Dawson; Rupert Everett
- Cinematography: Ben Davis
- Edited by: Chris Dickens
- Music by: Steven Price
- Production companies: Berlanti-Schechter Films; Independent Film Company; MGC
- Distributed by: Amazon Studios
- Release dates: 11 September 2022 (TIFF); 21 October 2022 (United States); 4 November 2022 (Prime Video)
- Running time: 113 minutes
- Countries: United Kingdom; United States
- Language: English

My Policeman is a 2022 romantic drama film based on the 2012 novel by Bethan Roberts and directed by Michael Grandage. The film stars Harry Styles, Emma Corrin, Gina McKee, Linus Roache, David Dawson, and Rupert Everett. It is inspired by the relationship between the writer E. M. Forster and Bob Buckingham.

My Policeman had its world premiere at the Toronto International Film Festival on 11 September 2022 and had a limited global release on 21 October 2022 by Amazon Studios before its streaming release on 4 November 2022 by Prime Video. The film received mixed reviews from critics, who praised Dawson's performance but criticized the direction and the screenplay.

== Plot ==
Retirees Marion and Tom live in the English seaside town of Peacehaven. After learning that their former friend from decades past, Patrick, has suffered a debilitating stroke, Marion agrees to take him into their home and becomes his caregiver. Tom resents Marion for allowing him back into their lives and refuses to acknowledge Patrick's existence in the house. While sorting through Patrick's belongings, she comes across his journal from the late 1950s, which reflects on his past relationship with Tom.

In 1957 Brighton, museum curator Patrick Hazelwood meets policeman Tom Burgess after reporting an accident. Patrick leaves Tom his business card, and Tom visits him at the museum where he works. Patrick invites Tom to his flat one night to draw him. The two have drinks, and Tom initiates physical touch, and they engage in oral sex. Afterwards, a shaken Tom abruptly leaves. Patrick later visits a bar one night and begins having sex with a stranger in an alley before they are caught by the police. Patrick manages to run away and finds Tom waiting for him at his flat. Tom admits his feelings, and the two have sex, resulting in a passionate romance.

Due to laws criminalizing homosexuality, as well as Tom's fear of jeopardizing his job at the police force, they carry on their relationship in secret. Tom meets schoolteacher Marion Taylor and begins courting her. He introduces her to Patrick, and they become fast friends, bonding over their shared interest in the arts. Soon, the three of them become inseparable. Tom later proposes to Marion, and they marry, but his relationship with Patrick continues. When Patrick visits Tom and Marion at their home, she discovers the two of them behaving affectionately with one another, triggering her underlying suspicions of Tom's sexuality. Marion feels angered and betrayed, which is exacerbated when Patrick invites Tom to accompany him on a business trip to Venice as his assistant. Shortly after their return, Patrick is arrested by Brighton police due to an anonymous report accusing him of homosexual activities. The case goes to trial, where Marion testifies on his behalf, but Patrick's journal entries, detailing his romantic and sexual relationship with Tom, are brought into evidence, resulting in his conviction. Patrick is sentenced to two years in prison, and Tom is fired from the police force. As Tom and Marion try to move on with their lives, he professes his love for her and vows they never speak of Patrick again.

In the present, Marion confesses to Tom that she was the one who reported Patrick, as a last effort to win him back, and has been living with guilt ever since. She challenges him to realize their marriage has been based on lies and that Patrick has always been his true love. She tells him she is leaving him and asks that he take care of Patrick and love him. After Marion's departure, Tom visits Patrick in his room, and they lovingly embrace each other.

== Cast ==
Scene from My Policeman featuring Harry Styles as Tom Burgess and David Dawson as Patrick Hazlewood.

- Harry Styles as Tom Burgess
  - Linus Roache as older Tom
- Emma Corrin as Marion Taylor
  - Gina McKee as older Marion
- David Dawson as Patrick Hazlewood
  - Rupert Everett as older Patrick
- Joseph Potter as Roy
- Jack Bandeira as Leonard
- Freya Mavor as Julia

== Production ==
It was announced in September 2020 that Amazon Studios would produce the film. Michael Grandage was set to direct a screenplay written by Ron Nyswaner, with Harry Styles and Lily James entering negotiations to star. James would exit negotiations by February 2021, with Emma Corrin replacing her. In March 2021, David Dawson, Linus Roache and Rupert Everett joined the cast of the film. In June 2021, Kadiff Kirwan joined the cast of the film.

Principal photography began in April 2021. Filming took place in London and Brighton and Hove. In Hove, filming took place at The Regency Town House in Brunswick Square for the wedding scene.

== Release ==
My Policeman had its world premiere at the Toronto International Film Festival on 11 September 2022. It screened at the Adelaide Film Festival from 19 October, before it had a limited theatrical release on 21 October 2022, and streamed on Prime Video from 4 November 2022.

== Critical reception ==
On Rotten Tomatoes, the film holds an approval rating of 45% based on 148 reviews, with an average rating of 5.7/10. The site's critical consensus reads, "Mildly arresting in its best moments, My Policeman tends toward the tedious despite the respectable efforts of a capable cast." Metacritic gave the film a weighted average score of 50 out of 100 based on 38 critics, indicating "mixed or average reviews".

In a review for The Hollywood Reporter, David Rooney wrote that the adaptation "does little to show that celebrated theater director Michael Grandage can translate his stage skills to the screen", that Grandage "gives the material so little edge" and that Nyswaner "never digs deep into his characters' psychology." He wrote that "Corrin is fine" and "as for Styles, he's not terrible, but he leaves a hole in the movie where a more multidimensional character with an inner life is needed most,". His assessment of Dawson's performance is also tepid, as he writes that the actor "plays the breezy sophisticate more convincingly than the lovelorn man inside." Gregory Ellwood of The Playlist gave the film a positive review, writing that Grandage's direction was "sublime" while complimenting the performances of Dawson and Styles, the latter of whom he says is "night and day here compared to his work in that other fall release." He continued by adding that Corrin "steals the show" while complimenting the historical accuracy. Robert Daniels of RogerEbert.com opined that the film "is surface-level queer representation lacking in visual imagination and begging for better performances", while giving negative opinions regarding the performances of Styles and Corrin. Ryan Lattanzio of IndieWire wrote that the film is "often very good, but the best scenes involve Dawson's rapier-witted and dandyish Patrick or Corrin's Marion" but felt that Styles' performance was "a blank beyond inscrutable gazes and sappy breakdowns," and that the role "requires levels of complexity and conveying inner turmoil that Styles can't provide." He continued to praise Dawson, writing "the movie is anchored, elevated, and very often knocked completely out of the park by Dawson, who is at turns sexy, mysterious, wise, naive, overflowingly open, vulnerable, and strong."

In a review for Vanity Fair, Richard Lawson proclaimed the film is "studied and plodding in its period-piece solemnity, a dirge of a movie about reckless people that is never warmed by their implied inner fire." He complimented the performances of Dawson and Corrin but was more mixed regarding Styles, writing that he "projects a glow of decency throughout the film, which means he’s not unwelcome in any given scene, but you ache for him every time a bit of dialogue thuds." Writing for The Guardian, Benjamin Lee stated that the film "isn't exactly a washout but it's not exactly much of anything, a disappointingly drab and stridently straightforward love triangle saga ... underpowered by a blank lead performance" and that "Grandage struggles to pull our heartstrings, an easy target easily missed," where Styles is "all construct and no conviction, a performer as unsure of his ability as we are", while also adding that "Corrin and Dawson are easily more effective than Styles but still a little too mannered to pierce through." Writing for Variety, Peter Debruge wrote that Nysaner "shapes this mystery somewhat strangely" while opining that "a more meaningful version of this story would have involved less time reading alone and more talking together." He added that Corrin "could do this role in their sleep, while Styles has "the tricky task of making Tom's betrayal feel tragic for all involved," while also commenting on Styles "fully embracing the ambiguity of his queerbaiting brand." Regarding Styles, David Jenkins of Little White Lies writes that "There's an understatement and simple clarity to his line delivery and body language that works well in the context of a man driven by primal desires." Tom Charity of The Times criticised the film's plot but wrote that Styles "outshines this plodding love triangle".

Leah Greenblatt of Entertainment Weekly opined that the film "is fevered, lovely to look at, and at times deeply silly" while writing that Dawson is "quietly affecting" whereas "Styles' style is more remote. His Tom often feels like a cipher, thoughtful and charming one moment and heedlessly cruel and manipulative the next." She added that the film "mostly feels like a movie we've seen many times before: a pleasantly escapist two hours with pretty people in pretty clothes, madly sublimating their feelings until the final, luminous frame." Luke Hearfield of the Evening Standard wrote that "Dawson's nuanced performance is the highlight of this film" and that "Styles tries but neither he nor his co-stars are helped by this plodding script," ending his review by writing "the real crime of this film is how painfully average it is." Nick Schwager of The Daily Beast wrote that "Styles and Dawson share no sparks" while criticising the direction of Grandage and Nysanner. Amber Dowling of Consequence wrote that "Emma Corrin and David Dawson breathe life into an otherwise lengthy sentence of a film" and that "Styles continues to make a name for himself in the acting space," but felt that there was a "lack of depth" throughout the film, specifically in regards to the character of Tom. Tim Grierson of Screen International felt that the film "is so reserved as to feel mannered" and that Dawson and Styles "have an elegant rapport" but that "neither character succeeds in being particularly complicated or tormented," adding that "the film's strong point may be Corrin". He ended his review by writing "tragic stories are worth telling, but My Policeman is ultimately too genteel for the task".

Gary Goldestein of the Los Angeles Times dubbed the film an "absorbing, resonant, deeply wistful adaptation" and opined that Styles "carries the day here" while also complimenting the musical score and the performances of Dawson, Corrin, McKee, and Everett. Jocelyn Noveck of Associated Press criticised Grandage's and Nyswaner's characteriziation of Tom, writing that "his character is very underdeveloped" and that it appears as if they chose to "mute the confident pop-star magnetism, in service of the story". Writing for Houston Chronicle, A.A. Dowd felt that Styles "isn’t quite up to the acting challenges" and named him the "weak link". He added that Grandage and Nyswaner "handle the helixed relationships of their borrowed material with sensitivity and compassion" but felt like "Grandage mutes the conflicts" while praising Dawson's performance. Wendy Ide of The Guardian gave the film a negative review, writing that "the best that can be said about Styles is that his is not the worst performance in Michael Grandage’s uninspired plodder, but that’s not much of an endorsement, given the half-hearted work from most of the cast". Richard Roeper of Chicago Sun-Times named the film "a borderline dull affair" and felt as if it "never really resonates". G. Allen Johnson of San Francisco Chronicle called the film "a simple, well-told story" and complimented Grandage's direction and Styles's performance, writing that "after two films as a leading man, it’s clear that Styles is more than a handsome face." Writing for the BBC, Caryn James opined that Styles "is far more convincing and has a much fuller, more grounded role in My Policeman" when compared to his performance in Don't Worry Darling but criticised the screenplay, feeling that it "could have explored much more". Kimberly Jones of The Austin Chronicle wrote that "the plot elements are all there for something emotional wrecking, but Grandage and his cast approach it with such enormous restraint, the oxygen is cut off completely. This is bloodless filmmaking". Thomas Floyd of The Washington Post named the film an "uninspired depiction of mid-century homophobia, forbidden love and long-simmering resentment" and called Styles's performance "flat" but praised the musical score and Dawson's performance, writing he plays his character with a "blend of yearning and pain".

=== Accolades ===
The main cast members were announced as the collective winners of an acting award at TIFF's Tribute Awards, the first time that an award in that category was ever presented to an ensemble cast rather than an individual. The film received a nomination in the 34th GLAAD Media Awards for Outstanding Film - Limited Release, losing to The Inspection. The film also received a Queerty award nomination for Studio Movie, losing to Everything Everywhere All At Once.
