= Michael Grassi =

Screenwriter and television producer

- Born: Montreal, Quebec, Canada
- Occupation: executive producer; screenwriter; showrunner
- Education: Ryerson University
- Years active: 2009–present
- Spouse: Matthew Grassi (née McConkey)

Michael Grassi is a Canadian born screenwriter, who has made television programs in both the United States and Canada. He is best known for his work on Degrassi: The Next Generation for which he was nominated for an Emmy, and won a Peabody for his writing. He is also known for working across genres including sitcom Schitt’s Creek, supernatural series Lost Girl, teen musical dramedy Katy Keene, and medical drama Brilliant Minds. Grassi also has a strong working relationship with television producer Greg Berlanti who helped him create Katy Keene and Brilliant Minds.

== Early life ==
Michael Grassi was born in Montreal, Quebec. During his childhood he noted that he was obsessed with the work of Kevin Williamson, creator of Dawson’s Creek, and writer of the film Scream. He also said that these artistic works were inspiring because they were so different from each other and a reason for his drive to become a screenwriter. He pursued his higher education at Ryerson University in Toronto, Ontario.

== Career ==
Michael Grassi began his writing career as a script coordinator for Degrassi: The Next Generation. While a part of the writing staff for the show, he wrote an episode entitled My Body Is a Cage for which he received an Emmy nomination and was awarded a Peabody. The episode was noted for featuring the struggles of a transgender teenage character. He then moved on to be story editor for Schitt’s Creek writing 13 episodes for the first season. Because of his cheerful, and hardworking nature, in 2014, executive produce Emily Andras hired him to be a consulting producer on Canadian supernatural series Lost Girl. By the following season Grassi had been promoted to executive producer, and showrunner for the fifth and final season of the show. Grassi then built a strong working relationship with Greg Berlanti and as a result Berlanti Productions. Grassi created his first program, Katy Keene, under the Berlanti Productions shingle. Katy Keene followed the eponymous Katy Keene as she and her friends tried to achieve success in the fashion industry of New York City. The show was cancelled after one season. In 2024, Grassi and Berlanti once again collaborated to create the show Brilliant Minds which NBC ordered to series. Grassi was also the showrunner for the show. Brilliant Minds was based on the life, and work of unconventional neurologist Dr. Oliver Sacks. The show was cancelled in 2026 after two seasons.

== Personal life ==
Grassi married actor and writer Matthew McConkey on May 7, 2022. They married in Ojai, California. Grassi is an avid runner, hiker, and boxer.

== Filmography ==
Television
Year	Title	Writer	Executive Producer
2024-2026	Brilliant Minds	Yes	Yes
2022-2024	Pretty Little Liars: Original Sin	Yes	Yes
2017-2021	Riverdale	Yes	Yes
2020	Katy Keene	Yes	Yes
2015-2016	Supergirl	Yes	No
2013-2015	Lost Girl	Yes	Yes
2015	Schitt's Creek	Yes	No
2009–2013	Degrassi: The Next Generation	Yes	No
