= Disgraceland =

Disgraceland may refer to:

- Disgraceland (The Orwells album), 2014
- Disgraceland (Elvis Hitler album), 1988
- Disgraceland (podcast), an American true crime music podcast
- Disgraceland, ring name of American professional wrestler Luther Biggs
- Disgraceland, a song about Elvis Presley on the 2001 album Dragontown by Alice Cooper]

== See also ==
- Graceland (disambiguation)
