= Dreamland =

Dreamland or Dream Land may refer to:

== Arts, entertainment and media ==
=== Comics ===
- Dreamland (manfra), a 2006 French comic book

=== Film ===
- Dreamland (2006 film), an American drama
- Dreamland (2007 film), an American science fiction film
- Dreamland (2009 film), an Icelandic documentary
- Dreamland (2016 film), an American comedy-drama
- Dreamland (2019 American film), an American drama thriller film with Finn Cole and Margot Robbie
- Dreamland (2019 Canadian film), a Canadian fantasy film directed by Bruce McDonald
- Dreamland: The Burning of Black Wall Street, a 2021 American documentary film

=== Television ===
- Dreamland (TV series), a 2023 British comedy television series
- Utopia (Australian TV series), a 2014 comedy renamed Dreamland for non-Australian audiences
- Dreamland (Doctor Who), a 2009 animated serial based on Doctor Who
- "Dreamland" (The X-Files), a 1998 sixth-season episode
- "Dreamland", the title of season 8 of Archer
- Dreamland, the primary setting of the 2018 animated series Disenchantment

=== Gaming ===
- Kirby's Dream Land, a 1992 video game

=== Literature ===
- Dreamland (Sparks novel), a 2022 novel by Nicholas Sparks
- Dreamland (Baker novel), a 1999 historical novel by Kevin Baker
- Dreamland (Dessen novel), a 2000 teen novel by Sarah Dessen
- Dreamland, a book series by Dale Brown, and the title of the first book
- Dreamland, a novel series by Jody Lynn Nye
- "Dreamland", an 1882 poem by Lewis Carroll
- "Dream-Land", an 1844 poem by Edgar Allan Poe
- Dreamland: A Self-Help Manual for a Frightened Nation, a 2006 non-fiction book by Andri Snær Magnason
- Dreamland: The True Tale of America's Opiate Epidemic, a 2015 non-fiction book by Sam Quinones
- Dreamlands, a fictional location in the work of H. P. Lovecraft

=== Music ===
==== Albums ====
- Dreamland (Aztec Camera album), 1993
- Dreamland (Beat Circus album), 2008
- Dreamland (Black Box album), 1990
- Dreamland (Glass Animals album), 2020
- Dreamland (Amos Lee album), 2022
- Dreamland (Robert Miles album), 1996
- Dreamland (Joni Mitchell album), 2004
- Dreamland (Madeleine Peyroux album), 1996
- Dreamland (Robert Plant album), 2002
- Dreamland (Wild Belle album), 2016
- Dreamland (Yellowjackets album), 1995
- Dreamland, a 2010 album by Brent Spiner and Maude Maggart
- Dreamland, a 2020 album by COIN
- Dreamland, a 2004 album by Dale Watson

==== Songs ====
- "Dreamland" (Bennie K song), 2005
- "Dreamland" (Pet Shop Boys song), 2019
- "Dreamland", a 1992 song by The B-52s from the album Good Stuff
- "Dreamland", a 2004 song by Bruce Hornsby from the album Halcyon Days
- "Dreamland", a 1998 song by HammerFall from the album Legacy of Kings
- "Dreamland", a 1976 song by Roger McGuinn from the album Cardiff Rose
- "Dreamland", a 1977 song by Joni Mitchell from the album Don Juan's Reckless Daughter
- "Dreamland", a 2011 song by Lillix
- "Dreamland", a 2009 song by Émilie Simon
- "Dream Land", a 2013 song by Perfume from Level3

== Places ==
=== Amusement parks ===
- Dreamland (Coney Island, 1904), in Brooklyn, New York, United States
- Dreamland (Coney Island, 2009), in Brooklyn, New York, United States
- Dreamland (Melbourne amusement park), in Australia
- Dreamland Margate, in Kent, United Kingdom
- Dream Land Isfahan, in Iran
- Nara Dreamland, near Nara, Japan
- Seabreeze Amusement Park in Rochester, New York, United States, known as Dreamland from the 1940s to the 1970s
- Yokohama Dreamland, in Yokohama, Japan

=== Other places ===
- Dreamland, Michigan, United States
- Dreamland, Egypt, a private urban development
- Dreamland (Fallujah, Iraq), a former U.S. military base
- Dreamland Ballroom, a music venue in Omaha, Nebraska, United States
- Dreamland Beach, in Bali, Indonesia
- Dreamland Rink, an entertainment venue in San Francisco
- Area 51, also known as Dreamland, a United States Air Force facility in Nevada

== Other uses ==
- Dreamland Bar-B-Que, a chain of restaurants in Alabama and Georgia, U.S.
- Dreamland Recording Studios, in Hurley, New York, U.S.

== See also ==
- Dreamworld (disambiguation)
- Graceland (disambiguation)
- Dreamlanders, the cast and crew of regulars whom John Waters has used in his films
- The Dreamland Chronicles, fantasy webcomic and comic book series
- Dreamland Egypt Classic, a former tennis tour series
