= Katy Keene (TV series) =

American musical comedy-drama television series

- Genre: Comedy drama; Musical
- Based on: Characters by: Archie Comics; Katy Keene by Bill Woggon
- Developed by: Roberto Aguirre-Sacasa & Michael Grassi
- Starring: Lucy Hale; Ashleigh Murray; Katherine LaNasa; Julia Chan; Jonny Beauchamp; Lucien Laviscount; Zane Holtz; Camille Hyde
- Narrated by: Lucy Hale
- Music by: James S. Levine
- Country of origin: United States
- Original language: English
- No. of seasons: 1
- No. of episodes: 13

Production
- Executive producers: Siobhan Bachman; Jon Goldwater; Sarah Schechter; Michael Grassi; Greg Berlanti; Roberto Aguirre-Sacasa
- Producers: Jennifer Lence; Caroline Baron
- Production location: New York City
- Cinematography: Brendan Uegama
- Editors: Harry Jierjian; Jessie Murray; Gaston Jaren Lopez; Daniel Hahn; Diandra Kendall Luzon
- Camera setup: Single-camera
- Running time: 42 minutes
- Production companies: Berlanti Productions; Archie Comics; CBS Television Studios; Warner Bros. Television

Original release
- Network: The CW
- Release: February 6 – May 14, 2020

Related
- Riverdale

Katy Keene is an American musical comedy-drama television series developed by Roberto Aguirre-Sacasa and Michael Grassi. It is based on the Archie Comics character of the same name. It chronicles the origins and struggles of four aspiring artists trying to attain successful careers on Broadway, on the runway, and in the recording studio. Katy Keene is a spin-off of Riverdale, and takes place five years after the events of the former series. The series was produced by Berlanti Productions, in association with Archie Comics, CBS Television Studios, and Warner Bros. Television.

Lucy Hale stars as Katy Keene, an aspiring fashion designer trying to navigate her way in New York City. Ashleigh Murray, Camille Hyde, Jonny Beauchamp, Julia Chan, Lucien Laviscount, Zane Holtz, and Katherine LaNasa also star, with Murray reprising her role as Josie McCoy from Riverdale. In January 2019, the series received a pilot order from The CW, to be considered for a series order in the 2019–20 television season. The series was filmed in New York City. The show was picked up to series in May 2019. The series premiered on The CW on February 6, 2020, with the series finale airing on May 14, 2020. In July 2020, the series was canceled after one season. This was the only CW cancellation of the 2019–2020 season.

Following the season finale, it was announced that the show would be the first CW show not to be released on either Netflix or the CW's own website and app, but instead would be part of HBO Max's debut lineup as an exclusive. It was the first CW show not to be offered to Netflix following the completion of its broadcast season. Following the announcement of the series' cancellation, the entire series was also made available on the CW website and app until 2021. The show streamed on HBO Max until it was removed on July 9, 2025.

== Premise ==
The series follows the professional and romantic lives of four Archie Comics characters, including fashion legend-to-be Katy Keene and singer-songwriter Josie McCoy, five years after the events of Riverdale, as they chased their dreams in New York City. The series infuses music into the plotlines and followed the origins, trials, and tribulations of four struggling artists who are desperate to make it in the spotlight.

== Cast and characters ==
=== Main ===
- Lucy Hale as Katy Keene: An aspiring fashion designer trying to navigate her way in New York City. This character was introduced in a crossover episode with Riverdale.
- Ashleigh Murray as Josie McCoy: A singer-songwriter chasing her music dreams in the Big Apple. This character was introduced in Riverdale. McCoy is now an adult, with Katy Keene being set five years after the previous series.
- Katherine LaNasa as Gloria Grandbilt: A personal shopper at the luxury department store Lacy's, which caters to the rich and famous.
- Julia Chan as Pepper Smith: An it girl with a mysterious background who wants to open up a studio for aspiring artists. The character is loosely based on Russian-German con artist Anna Sorokin.
- Jonny Beauchamp as Jorge / Ginger Lopez: A drag queen and aspiring Broadway performer who wants to take his drag career to the next level. A different version of the character was introduced in the first season of Riverdale, portrayed by Caitlin Mitchell-Markovitch.
- Lucien Laviscount as Alexander "Alex" Cabot: The CEO of his father's company who dreams of reopening a dead record label.
- Zane Holtz as K.O. Kelly: A boxer and Katy's longtime boyfriend who dreams of fighting a welterweight championship in Madison Square Garden, and makes ends meet as a personal trainer and bouncer.
- Camille Hyde as Alexandra "Xandra" Cabot: A powerful New York City socialite who is trying to work her way up in her father's company. She is the senior vice president of Cabot Entertainment. She also dislikes Josie McCoy.

=== Recurring ===
- Nathan Lee Graham as François: A visual merchandiser at Lacy's.
- Heléne Yorke as Amanda: One of Gloria's assistants who sees Katy as a competitor.
- Daphne Rubin-Vega as Luisa Lopez: Jorge's mother, a former Rockette and now co-owner of a bodega.
- Saamer Usmani as Prince Errol Swoon: A royal prince of a foreign country.
- André De Shields as Chubby: Josie's boss at a record store.
- Erica Pappas as Patricia Klein: Prince Errol's fiancee.
- Ryan Faucett as Bernardo Bixby: A firefighter and Jorge's love interest.
- Frank Pando as Luis Lopez: Jorge's father and co-owner of the bodega with Luisa.
- Candace Maxwell as Didi: Pepper's assistant and love interest.
- Abubakr Ali as Raj Patel: KO's roommate, a filmmaker and one of Pepper's love interests.
- Luke Cook as Guy LaMontagne: A famous fashion designer.
- Bernadette Peters as Miss Freesia: A wealthy Upper East sider and Pepper's mother figure who taught her the art of the con.
- Eric Freeman as Buzz Brown: A former love interest of Jorge's
- Mary Beth Peil as Loretta Lacy: Lacy's owner.
- Azriel Crews as Cricket: the shy keyboardist in the revived Josie and the Pussycats
- Emily Rafala as Trula Twyst: The activist drummer in the revived Josie and the Pussycats

=== Guest ===
- Casey Wilson as herself: An actress and Guy LaMontagne's client for the Meta Gala. Wilson played a fictionalized version of herself.
- Cary Elwes as Leo Lacy: Loretta Lacy's son who seems to have a connection with Katy's mother.

=== Crossover characters from Riverdale ===
- Robin Givens as Sierra McCoy: Josie's mother, lawyer and former mayor of Riverdale.
- Casey Cott as Kevin Keller: Josie's step-brother and friend from high school.
- Mark Consuelos as Hiram Lodge: A businessman from Riverdale and the CEO of Lodge Industries.

== Episodes ==
No.	Title	Directed by	Written by	Original release date	Prod. code	U.S. viewers (millions)
1	"Chapter One: Once Upon a Time in New York"	Maggie Kiley	Roberto Aguirre-Sacasa & Michael Grassi	February 6, 2020	T82.01001	0.62
Living in New York with her boyfriend KO Kelly and her roommate, drag performer Jorge Lopez, Katy Keene works to achieve her dream job: personal shopper to her boss at Lacy's department store, Gloria Grandbilt. Although Katy is more than qualified, Gloria chooses another girl, Amanda, over her, in part because of her envy towards Katy's talent as a designer, and reassigns her to work as a stock girl when she complains. Jorge, tired of being repeatedly passed over for Broadway roles because of his lack of "masculinity", auditions as Ginger, his drag persona. When he is rejected again, he vows to make it on his own by any means. Katy's friend Josie moves to New York, where she is recruited by Alexander Cabot to be the first singer signed to his new label. However, her song is rejected, and Alex's spiteful sister Alexandra reveals her brother's womanizing ways; heartbroken, Josie quits the label. Katy's friend Francois hires her to work for him, but only until she is ready to open her own store. When she informs KO, he surprises her by proposing marriage.
2	"Chapter Two: You Can't Hurry Love"	Steven A. Adelson	Michael Grassi	February 13, 2020	T82.10102	0.53
3	"Chapter Three: What Becomes of the Broken Hearted"	Harry Jierjian	Shauna McGarry	February 20, 2020	T82.10103	0.52
4	"Chapter Four: Here Comes the Sun"	Pamela Romanowsky	Alina Mankin	February 27, 2020	T82.10104	0.45
5	"Chapter Five: Song for a Winter's Night"	Ryan Shiraki	Leo Richardson	March 5, 2020	T82.10105	0.48
6	"Chapter Six: Mama Said"	Charles Randolph-Wright	Davia Carter	March 12, 2020	T82.10106	0.51
Note: This episode is a crossover with Riverdale.
7	"Chapter Seven: Kiss of the Spider Woman"	Gregory Smith	Roberto Aguirre-Sacasa	March 19, 2020	T82.10107	0.46
Katy has been asked by Patricia to design her wedding dress, making her uncomfortable after sleeping with Errol, who tells her he will cancel the wedding if she wants to be with him. Gloria is also pressuring her to create the dress. Jorge is being couched by Francoise as his "drag godmother" and expresses his wishes to perform Kiss of the Spider Woman as a solo performer. Pepper manages to prepare a show at The Pepper Plant and gain investors, but no one shows interest. Pepper asks Xandra and Alex to be investors, but Alex only agrees if Josie gets to perform the title role. Katy asks Guy LaMontagne for help and tells Patricia she should wear one of his dresses, making her less guilty for what happened, and Patricia accepts as she loves the dress. Josie and Jorge perform together as Spider Woman, making him feel free as his father finally learns the truth about him, even though he is not totally supportive of him being a drag queen. As Jorge and Bernardo walk together after the show, they are surrounded by four homophobic men.
8	"Chapter Eight: It's Alright, Ma (I'm Only Bleeding)"	Jessica Lowrey	Will Ewing	March 26, 2020	T82.10108	0.45
9	"Chapter Nine: Wishin' & a Hopin'"	Pamela Romanowsky	Mia Katherine Iverson	April 16, 2020	T82.10109	0.49
10	"Chapter Ten: Gloria"	Alex Pillai	Michael Grassi & Neil McNeil	April 23, 2020	T82.10110	0.48
Kevin Keller, a teacher at Riverdale High, visits Josie and meets her friends. Xandra asks Josie to be a Pussycat, but she refuses as there have been issues between both. Katy has a sex dream about Guy, and it makes her more uncomfortable when she receives one of his dresses. Gloria releases a book; after her reading, an article appears claiming she treats her female employees badly, and hinting that one of them slept with royalty. When Gloria is fired as a result, she asks Katy to write a letter to clear her name. Josie's bandmates quit after talking with Kevin and learning about Josie's issues with previous bandmates. Jorge proposes that he, Buzz and Bernardo become a "throuple", but Buzz declines. Pepper helps Kevin deal with a director who previously treated him poorly, and exposes him for sexual harassment. Gloria tells Katy she had a romance with one of her superiors in the past, and advises Katy not to repeat her mistakes - making Katy realize she needs to keep things professional with Guy. While cleaning Gloria's desk, Katy finds a letter revealing Gloria (and possibly Katy's mother as well) had a romance with Mrs. Lacy's son. Xandra steals one of Josie's songs and performs at one of her shows. Bernardo breaks up with Jorge, and when Jorge tries to fix things he finds out Bernardo and Buzz got together. Note: This episode is a crossover with Riverdale.
11	"Chapter Eleven: Who Can I Turn To?"	Lea Thompson	Sara Saedi	April 30, 2020	T82.10111	0.40
Katy feels disappointed after she was rejected at Parsons. The Met Gala is soon and she tries to balance her duties helping Guy and Amanda, causing her problems with Guy, and KO to punch him when he is being rude to Katy. Guy disappears after the incident and since she can't find him she redesigns the dress he previously made for a client. Pepper asks Alex to be on investor on The Pepper Plant, but he has his doubts on her. Pepper has an idea to promote both the Pepper Plant and Josie's band on the Met Gala, who perform on the event, angering Xandra. Hannah, Pepper's ex wife, tells Alex the truth about her and tells Josie about it.Katy and Guy have sex that same night.
12	"Chapter Twelve: Chain of Fools"	Steven A. Adelson	Evelyn Yves	May 7, 2020	T82.10112	0.44
After Jorge discovers his parents are having money problems, he accepts a job at Lacy's and starts go-go dancing. Guy sees one of Katy's sketches and to her surprise, creates a dress almost identical. Alex tells Pepper he wants his money back or he'll call the police, so Pepper steals a diamond purse to get the money. Pepper is confronted by her friends, who felt deceived by her lies. Pepper uses the money to pay Jorge's parents' mortgage, but it is still not enough to save the building, meaning they have to move. Katy discovers Guy has stolen sketches from other apprentices for his dresses. Alex works with his father again, disappointing Josie. Pepper is arrested.
13	"Chapter Thirteen: Come Together"	Maggie Kiley	Roberto Aguirre-Sacasa & Michael Grassi	May 14, 2020	T82.10113	0.41
Josie finds evidence that Alex has relapsed; she joins forces with Xandra to get him into rehab. Guy offers Katy the position of lead designer; KO shows up to see Katy, but leaves unseen when he hears Guy profess his love to Katy. Although Katy is pleased, she later reconsiders and declines the offer. Katy speaks with Gloria on how to save Lacy's and they organize their own "Fashion Week" show featuring designs from Guy's interns (the ones whose sketchbooks Guy had stolen). Jorge plans a party at Washington Heights and performs as Ginger to collect the signatures needed to stop demolition of their building. Katy gets accepted at Parsons, and rushes to Grand Central to find KO. He's moving to Philly to fulfill his dreams; Katy fondly wishes him well, but doesn't reveal her feelings, fearing he might decide to stay on her account. Errol (who is no longer a prince) buys Lacy's, giving Gloria, Katy and the others their jobs back. Hiram Lodge arrives at the bodega, ominously telling Jorge and his parents that he had intended to buy the block, but they foiled his plan. Josie asks Pepper to be her band manager and she accepts. Katy meets Leo Lacy, Mrs. Lacy's son, and tells him he might be her father. Without being a crossover, this episode features a cameo appearance by Mark Consuelos as Hiram Lodge, a character from Riverdale.

== Production ==
=== Development ===
In August 2018, Roberto Aguirre-Sacasa revealed that another spin-off was in the works at The CW. He said that the potential spin-off would be "very different from Riverdale" and that it would be produced "in [the 2018–19] development cycle." On January 23, 2019, The CW issued an official pilot order for the series that will "[follow] the lives and loves of four iconic Archie Comics characters — including fashion legend-to-be Katy Keene — as they chase their twenty-something dreams in New York City. This musical dramedy chronicles the origins and struggles of four aspiring artists trying to make it on Broadway, on the runway and in the recording studio." On May 7, 2019, The CW ordered the show to series. On January 7, 2020, The CW ordered thirteen more scripts for the series. On July 2, 2020, The CW canceled the series after one season due to the COVID-19 pandemic. This was the only cancellation of the 2019–2020 season.

=== Casting ===
On February 4, 2019, it was announced that Ashleigh Murray, who stars in Riverdale, had been cast in a lead role in the spinoff, exiting Riverdale. On February 21, 2019, Jonny Beauchamp and Julia Chan joined the cast of the series as Jorge Lopez and Pepper Smith, respectively. A few days later, on February 26, 2019, Camille Hyde and Lucien Laviscount joined the cast as brother and sister duo, Alexandra and Alexander Cabot. Finally, on March 11, 2019, Lucy Hale was cast in the series' lead and titular role.

=== Filming ===
The series was filmed in New York City.

=== Connection to Riverdale ===
On August 4, 2019, Michael Grassi announced that there was going to be a crossover between Riverdale and Katy Keene in the future. The crossover episode aired on February 5, 2020, as a part of Riverdale, and introduced Katy for the first time.

Katy Keene crosses over with Riverdale in the sixth episode when Robin Givens reprises her role as Sierra McCoy from Riverdale. Four episodes later, Casey Cott reprises his role as Kevin Keller in episode ten. In the last episode of the first season, Mark Consuelos reprises his role as Hiram Lodge.

Despite the cancellation, characters from Katy Keene appear in Riverdale: Zane Holtz reprised his role as K.O. Kelly in the first episode of season five and in the tenth episode of season six, followed by Ryan Faucett as Bernardo in the seventh episode of the same season, Lucy Hale reprised her role in a voice-over cameo in the eighth episode, and Camille Hyde reprised her role as Alexandra Cabot in the fifteenth episode. The character Chad Gekko, who appeared in two episodes of Katy Keene, also returns as a recurring characters in season five, played by Chris Mason. Mason replaces Reid Prebenda, who portrayed the character in the spin-off.

== Music ==
Musical performances are featured throughout the series, a blend of cover versions and originals. Songs performed in episodes are released as digital singles after broadcast by WaterTower Music.

Following the end of the season, the label released a digital compilation for season 1 songs. The musical episode "Kiss of the Spider Woman", featuring songs from the musical of the same name, received its own soundtrack, released on March 20, 2020.

Katy Keene: Season 1 (Original Television Soundtrack)
No.	Title	Artist(s)	Length
1.	"Cut to the Feeling"	Ashleigh Murray	3:27
2.	"Diamonds Are Forever / Material Girl"	Jonny Beauchamp	1:47
3.	"Glow" (piano version)	Ashleigh Murray	3:05
4.	"Glow"	Ashleigh Murray	2:40
5.	"Spanish Harlem"	Ashleigh Murray and Tonya Pinkins	1:52
6.	"Moment 4 Life"	Jonny Beauchamp	2:55
7.	"Million Reasons"	Jonny Beauchamp	3:15
8.	"You Can't Hurry Love"	Ashleigh Murray	2:08
9.	"City of Lights"	Ashleigh Murray and Andrew Polec	1:48
10.	"Unbreak My Heart"	Jonny Beauchamp	4:18
11.	"Dirrty"	Lucy Hale, Ashleigh Murray, Julia Chan and Jonny Beauchamp	2:10
12.	"Eye on the Sparrow"	Ashleigh Murray and Camille Hyde	1:01
13.	"My Strongest Suit"	Lucy Hale, Ashleigh Murray, Julia Chan and Jonny Beauchamp	2:34
14.	"Pretty Hurts"	Jonny Beauchamp	2:16
15.	"Try" (Josie and Chubby version)	Ashleigh Murray and André De Shields	3:21
16.	"Bad" (Josie and the Pussycats version)	Ashleigh Murray, Azriel Crews and Emily Rafala	2:38
17.	"Bad" (Xandra version)	Camille Hyde	2:21
18.	"Kiss My Hand"	Ashleigh Murray, Azriel Crews and Emily Rafala	3:00
19.	"She Bop"	Ashleigh Murray, Azriel Crews and Emily Rafala	3:11
20.	"Conga"	Jonny Beauchamp, Nathan Lee Graham and Daphne Rubin-Vega	2:09
21.	"Try" (Xandra version)	Camille Hyde	2:10
22.	"Dreams"	Ashleigh Murray, Azriel Crews and Emily Rafala	3:17
23.	"She Used to Be Mine"	Lucy Hale	3:46
24.	"New York State of Mind"	Bernadette Peters	2:20

Katy Keene: Special Episode – Kiss of the Spider Woman: The Musical (Original Television Soundtrack)
No.	Title	Artist(s)	Length
1.	"Prologue"	Jonny Beauchamp	1:52
2.	"Prologue" (reprise)	Lucy Hale	1:19
3.	"A Visit"	Jonny Beauchamp	1:53
4.	"Dressing Them Up"	Lucy Hale, Jonny Beauchamp and Nathan Lee Graham	2:07
5.	"You Could Never Shame Me"	Daphne Rubin-Vega and Jonny Beauchamp	2:20
6.	"Where You Are"	Julia Chan and Candace Maxwell	3:47
7.	"Gimme Love"	Ashleigh Murray	1:28
8.	"Kiss of the Spider Woman"	Ashleigh Murray and Jonny Beauchamp	1:43

== Release ==
=== Marketing ===
On May 16, 2019, The CW released the first official trailer for the series. The series' extended trailer was released in August 2019.

=== Broadcast and streaming ===
Katy Keene aired from February 6 until May 14, 2020 on The CW. The series is available on HBO Max until it was removed on July 8, 2025.

== International broadcast ==
The series was acquired for the UK by the BBC in July 2020 for its on-demand service BBC iPlayer.

== Reception ==
=== Critical response ===
On Rotten Tomatoes, the series has an approval rating of 91% based on 23 reviews, with an average rating of 6.7/10. The website's critical consensus reads, "Katy Keene definitely has style to spare, but its greatest strength is its warm, joyous tone that sparkles in a sea of gritty YA TV." On Metacritic, it has a weighted average score of 71 out of 100 based on 8 reviews, indicating "generally favorable reviews".

=== Ratings ===
Viewership and ratings per episode of Katy Keene
No.	Title	Air date	Rating (18–49)	Viewers (millions)	DVR (18–49)	DVR viewers (millions)	Total (18–49)	Total viewers (millions)
1	"Chapter One: Once Upon a Time in New York"	February 6, 2020	0.2	0.62	0.1	0.25	0.3	0.87
2	"Chapter Two: You Can't Hurry Love"	February 13, 2020	0.1	0.53	0.1	0.17	0.2	0.70
3	"Chapter Three: What Becomes of the Broken Hearted"	February 20, 2020	0.1	0.52	0.1	0.16	0.2	0.68
4	"Chapter Four: Here Comes the Sun"	February 27, 2020	0.1	0.45	0.1	0.17	0.2	0.62
5	"Chapter Five: Song for a Winter's Night"	March 5, 2020	0.1	0.48	0.1	0.17	0.2	0.65
6	"Chapter Six: Mama Said"	March 12, 2020	0.1	0.51	0.1	0.16	0.2	0.67
7	"Chapter Seven: Kiss of the Spider Woman"	March 19, 2020	0.1	0.46	0.1	0.17	0.2	0.63
8	"Chapter Eight: It's Alright, Ma (I'm Only Bleeding)"	March 26, 2020	0.1	0.45	0.1	0.17	0.2	0.62
9	"Chapter Nine: Wishin' & a Hopin'"	April 16, 2020	0.1	0.49	0.1	0.15	0.2	0.64
10	"Chapter Ten: Gloria"	April 23, 2020	0.1	0.48	0.0	0.12	0.1	0.60
11	"Chapter Eleven: Who Can I Turn To?"	April 30, 2020	0.1	0.40	0.0	0.12	0.1	0.52
12	"Chapter Twelve: Chain of Fools"	May 7, 2020	0.1	0.44	0.0	0.12	0.1	0.56
13	"Chapter Thirteen: Come Together"	May 14, 2020	0.1	0.41	0.0	0.11	0.1	0.52
