= Scooby-Doo: Origins =

Upcoming American television series

- Genre: Mystery; Supernatural; Horror
- Created by: Josh Appelbaum; Scott Rosenberg
- Based on: Scooby-Doo by: Joe Ruby; Ken Spears
- Showrunners: Josh Appelbaum; Scott Rosenberg
- Starring: Mckenna Grace; Tanner Hagen; Abby Ryder Fortson; Maxwell Jenkins; Paul Walter Hauser; Frank Welker
- Country of origin: United States
- Original language: English

Production
- Executive producers: Greg Berlanti; Sarah Schechter; Leigh London Redman; Josh Appelbaum; Scott Rosenberg; André Nemec; Jeff Pinkner; Adrienne Erickson; Toby Haynes
- Production locations: Atlanta, Georgia
- Production companies: Berlanti Productions; Midnight Radio; Warner Bros. Television

Original release
- Network: Netflix

Scooby-Doo: Origins is an upcoming American mystery television series created by Josh Appelbaum and Scott Rosenberg, based on the long-running animated franchise. The first live-action television series in the franchise, it focuses on four teenagers as they set out to solve a mystery involving a supernatural murder that may have been witnessed by a Great Dane puppy. Appelbaum and Rosenberg serve as showrunners, head writers, and executive producers.

The series will feature Mckenna Grace, Tanner Hagen, Abby Ryder Fortson, Maxwell Jenkins, Paul Walter Hauser, and Frank Welker. Development of a Scooby-Doo television series was reported in April 2024 and officially announced in March of the following year. Warner Bros. Television produced the series along with Berlanti Productions and Midnight Radio. Filming took place between April and September 2026.

Scooby-Doo: Origins is scheduled to be released on the streaming service Netflix in 2027, and will consist of eight episodes.

== Premise ==
During their final summer at Camp Ruby-Spears, four teenagers—Daphne Blake, Shaggy Rogers, Velma Dinkley, and Fred Jones—become embroiled in a mystery revolving around a supernatural murder that may have been witnessed by a Great Dane puppy. Together, they set out to solve this mystery that threatens to expose all their hometown's personal secrets.

== Cast and characters ==
- Mckenna Grace as Daphne Blake
- Tanner Hagen as Shaggy Rogers
- Abby Ryder Fortson as Velma Dinkley
- Maxwell Jenkins as Fred Jones
- Paul Walter Hauser as the owner of Scooby-Doo
- Frank Welker as the voice of Scooby-Doo
- Sara Gilbert
- Peter Macon
- Bruce McGill
- André Benjamin
- Cathy Moriarty
- Rusty Schwimmer
- Maxwell Simkins
- Jona Xiao
- Dani Deetté
- Elysée Sanvillé
- Alex Isles
- Avery Kristen Pohl
- Pamela Mitchell
- Ross Kimball
- Wynn Everett
- Sauriyan Sapkota
- Sherilyn Fenn

== Episodes ==
The series will consist of eight episodes. Executive producer Toby Haynes will direct the first episode.

== Production ==
=== Development ===
In late April 2024, Deadline Hollywood reported that the streaming service Netflix had signed a deal with Warner Bros. Television and Berlanti Productions to develop a live-action/CGI television series based on the Scooby-Doo franchise that Deadline referred to as Scooby-Doo! The Live-Action Series. Warner Bros. Television and Berlanti Productions would be responsible for producing the series along with Midnight Radio, with employees from the latter two companies acting as executive producers, including Berlanti Productions co-founder and CEO Greg Berlanti, as well as Sarah Schechter and Leigh London Redman; and Midnight Radio's Josh Appelbaum, Scott Rosenberg, André Nemec, and Jeff Pinkner. In addition to being executive producers, Appelbaum and Rosenberg would also serve as head writers.

The series was officially announced in March 2025, with Appelbaum and Rosenberg as showrunners. In January 2026, Production Weekly listed the series as Scooby-Doo: Origins. In March, Toby Haynes was revealed to be an executive producer; he would also direct the first episode of the series. The series' title was confirmed as Scooby-Doo: Origins the following month.

=== Writing ===
The series is presented as a modern reimagining of Scooby-Doo that explores how the five main characters of the franchise—Scooby-Doo, Daphne Blake, Shaggy Rogers, Velma Dinkley, and Fred Jones—met while investigating a mystery involving a supernatural murder that may have been witnessed by Scooby.

=== Casting ===
By August 2025, the members of Mystery Inc. were expected to be played by teenage actors aged between 14 and 17 in the series. That December, Frank Welker—who has voiced both Fred and Scooby-Doo since 1969 and 2002, respectively—was reported to be reprising the latter role in the series. In February 2026, Mckenna Grace was revealed to have been cast in the role of Daphne Blake. She had previously voiced a young version of the character in the animated film Scoob! (2020) and its unreleased prequel Scoob! Holiday Haunt.

The following month, Paul Walter Hauser was hired to portray Scooby's owner, while Tanner Hagen, Abby Ryder Fortson, and Maxwell Jenkins were cast as Shaggy Rogers, Velma Dinkley, and Fred Jones, respectively. Sara Gilbert joined the cast in May. In June, several actors were revealed to have joined, including Bruce McGill, Peter Macon, Rusty Schwimmer, Maxwell Simkins, Jona Xiao, Dani Deetté, Elysée Sanvillé, Alex Isles, Avery Kristen Pohl, Pamela Mitchell, Ross Kimball, Wynn Everett, Sauriyan Sapkota, and Sherilyn Fenn. In August it was reported that André Benjamin and Cathy Moriarty would have recurring roles. The character of Scooby-Doo was portrayed by a live-action Great Dane.

=== Filming ===
Principal photography began on April 24, 2026 at Cinespace Film Studios in Atlanta, and wrapped up on September 13.

== Release ==
The series is scheduled to be released on Netflix in 2027, and will consist of eight episodes.
