= Elvis Hitler =

American psychobilly band

- Also known as: Splatter
- Origin: Detroit, Michigan, U.S.
- Genre: Psychobilly
- Years active: 1986–1994
- Labels: Wang Head; Restless
- Members: Jim Leedy (a.k.a. "Elvis Hitler") (vocals); John Defever (guitar); Jimmy Taylor (bass); Geno OneMore (drums)

Elvis Hitler was an American rock & psychobilly band from Detroit, Michigan. The band was named after the moniker of their lead singer, Jim Leedy, a combination of rockabilly singer Elvis Presley's first name and the last name of dictator Adolf Hitler.

== History ==
The band consisted of singer Jim Leedy (a.k.a. "Elvis Hitler"), guitarist John Defever, and drummer Geno OneMore. Their first album, Disgraceland, was initially released on Wang Head records in 1987 (WH004) and early copies came in a handmade sleeve formed from corrugated cardboard with a black-and-white sheet pasted to the front and back. The band put out two CDs on Restless Records: Hellbilly and Supersadomasochisticexpialidocious.

Their song "Green Haze" consisted of the lyrics from the theme song of television series Green Acres sung to the tune of Jimi Hendrix's "Purple Haze", and was a college radio hit.

Due to the resistance of having a band with the name Hitler in the title, regardless of its intent, the band released one album under the name "Splatter".

The band and their song "Green Haze" are mentioned in Thomas Pynchon's 2013 novel Bleeding Edge (pg. 177).

== Discography ==
- Disgraceland (1988)
- Hellbilly' (1989)
- Supersadomasochisticexpialidocious (1992)
- ...From Hell to Eternity (as "Splatter") (1994)

== See also ==
- List of psychobilly bands

== Notes ==
1.Released with the band renamed as Splatter.
