= Sarah Schechter (producer) =

American television and film producer

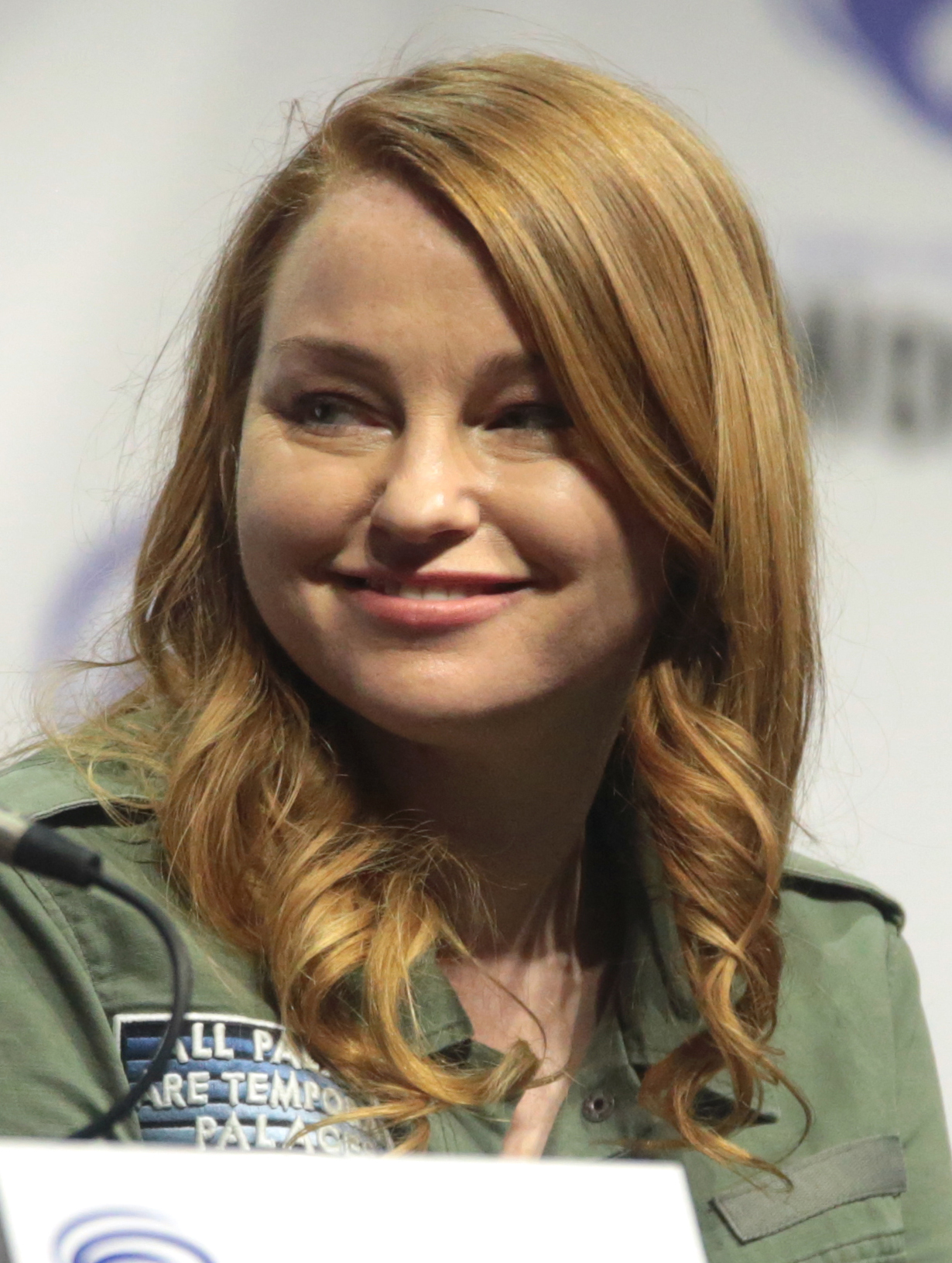
- Schechter in 2017
- Born: 1976 (age 49–50); Boston, Massachusetts, U.S.
- Education: University of California, Santa Cruz
- Occupations: Television producer; film producer
- Years active: 1999–present
- Parent: Danny Schechter (father)

Sarah Schechter (born 1976) is an American television and film producer. Schechter is chairperson and partner at Berlanti Productions, and the co-founder of Berlanti-Schechter Films.

In October 2020, with 17 scripted series then on the air, she became one of the most prolific producers in television history.

== Early life and education ==
Schechter was born in Boston and grew up in Brookline, Massachusetts and New York City. Her father, Danny Schechter, a grandson of Russian-Jewish immigrant socialists, was a human rights activist, author, filmmaker and television producer.

She attended the preparatory school Milton Academy, and in 1998 graduated from UC Santa Cruz with a degree in film theory.

== Career ==
Schechter began her career in New York, working for the documentarian Barbara Kopple and on independent film projects. She later moved to Los Angeles, where she spent six years working for the producer Barry Mendel, and nine years as a development executive at Warner Bros. Television.

Schechter begin working with Greg Berlanti on Life as We Know It, and in 2014 was named president of Berlanti Productions. In February 2020, she was promoted to partner and chairperson.

Schechter has produced over 17 television series, and produced My Policeman, Unpregnant, Free Guy and Alice & Freda Forever.

== Selected credits ==
- Superman & Lois
- Riverdale
- Katy Keene
- Gotham Knights
- Doom Patrol
- Titans
- Chilling Adventures of Sabrina
- Batwoman
- Black Lightning
- Supergirl
- The Flight Attendant
- Legends of Tomorrow
- The Flash
- Arrow
- Kung Fu
- Her
- Gran Torino
- Moonshot
- Helter Skelter: An American Myth
- Equal
- Atlas
- Brilliant Minds
- Fly Me to the Moon
- Scooby-Doo: Origins
