= Equal (TV series) =

American docuseries

- Genre: Docuseries
- Directed by: Stephen Kijak; Kimberly Reed
- Starring: Samira Wiley; Jamie Clayton; Anthony Rapp; Alexandra Grey
- Narrated by: Billy Porter
- Country of origin: United States
- Original language: English
- No. of episodes: 4

Production
- Executive producers: David Collins; Michael Williams; Rob Eric; Joel Chiodi; Greg Berlanti; Sarah Schechter; Jim Parsons; Todd Spiewak; Jon Jashni; Mike Darnell; Brooke Karzen
- Producers: Diane Becker; Melanie Miller
- Running time: 60 minutes
- Production companies: Scout Productions; Berlanti Productions; Raintree Ventures; That's Wonderful Productions; Warner Horizon Unscripted Television

Original release
- Network: HBO Max
- Release: October 22, 2020

Equal is an American documentary television series produced by Scout Productions, Berlanti Productions, Raintree Ventures, That's Wonderful Productions, and Warner Horizon Unscripted Television. The four-part series chronicles landmark events and leaders in LGBTQ history, and consists of a mixture of archival footage and scripted reenactments. Equal stars several actors including Samira Wiley, Jamie Clayton, and Anthony Rapp. The series premiered on HBO Max on October 22, 2020.

== Plot ==
=== Episode 1 ===
This episode explores the rise of the Mattachine Society and the Daughters of Bilitis.

Dale Jennings and Harry Hay were both married to women before they founded the Mattachine Society. Dale has twice married women.

Kinsey Reports on sexual behavior among men is first published in 1948. This is widely discussed among gay men at the time due to its conclusion of high numbers having had a homosexual experience.

Del Martin was married and divorced from a man before going on to become an activist with the Daughters of Bilitis.

In the 1950s, gay people were prohibited from working for the US government because of Executive Order 10450; this loss of employment became known as the Lavender scare.

ONE magazine was first published in 1953. Mattachine Society members sought to outlaw entrapment. The Ladder (magazine) was first published in 1956. In the 1950s, Ernestine Eckstein says, "The negro cause is widely accepted. The homosexual cause is not yet accepted." Gays and lesbians were seen as "immoral" and "sick." The Council on Religion and the Homosexual was set up in the 1960s to win religious support for the civil rights of gay people; Evander Smith and Herb Donaldson (lawyer) were its leaders.

=== Episode 2 ===
This episode focuses on the 20th-century transgender movement, including the 1966 Compton Cafeteria riots in Tenderloin, San Francisco. Even earlier, masquerade laws were used to arrest trans men and women.

The FBI goes after Lucy Hicks Anderson because she was receiving the extra pay allotment as the married wife of her husband Reuben Anderson. She faced a "federal fraud case" since the authorities didn't accept her female gender. Both she and her husband were given prison time as a result, but remained together afterward.

In the early 20th century, trans man Jack Starr lives a rough, wild life working as a bootlegger and bartender. He was more than once arrested for traveling on public roads in a male "disguise" according to authorities. Starr's story is also the least documented-his ultimate fate remains a mystery.

Christine Jorgensen's very public transition is recounted, with real footage of her from the 1950s after she underwent a sex reassignment operation in Scandinavia. Multiple films and books are written about this, while she struggles greatly with being in the spotlight, as her life is delved into. Nonetheless, she speaks of her life and experience in good humor.

Trans women, after frequent police harassment, fight back in the Compton's Cafeteria riot. After they were not permitted back into the cafeteria, LGBT+ people picket the establishment before a second riot erupts. Following this, the government of San Francisco allows transgender people to address people publicly, showcasing their humanity and asking for tolerance, with this sparking the movement for trans rights continuing into contemporary times.

=== Episode 3 ===
This episode highlights contributions from the Black community to the growing LGBTQ civil rights movement. David Susskind praises Lorraine Hansberry's A Raisin in the Sun on his television show. Hansberry and her husband become active in Greenwich Village. Though openly a lesbian, Hansberry was part of lesbian groups privately, saw women and advocated gay rights under a pseudonym. She publicly supported Marxism and black liberation also.

Bayard Rustin, a civil rights leader, was very unusual in being openly gay. His conviction for having sex with other men made him perceived as a liability to the civil rights movement. As a result, he was banished temporarily, with the segregationist US Senator Strom Thurmond seeking to use Rustin against them. Nonetheless, Rustin was a key organizer of major civil rights efforts, including the March on Washington, where he spoke publicly for the effort.

José Sarria performed at the Black Cat Bar in San Francisco, California. In 1961, Sarria becomes the first gay person to run for public office.

In Los Angeles, police arrest hundreds of gay people at the Black Cat Tavern in 1967.

=== Episode 4 ===
This episode tackles the Stonewall Riots and the beginning of the Pride movement."

Craig Rodwell does janitorial work on Fire Island. Later, he opens up a book shop on Mercer Street (Manhattan).

Marsha P. Johnson became known as "the mayor of Christopher Street" in the 1960s. Billy Porter says that the Genovese crime family opened up the Stonewall Inn; in the 1960s, it was illegal to serve liquor to gay and trans people in public bars in New York City.

The Gay Liberation Front (GLF) is founded in June 1969 after the Stonewall Riots. While the Gay Liberation Front sought to form a coalition with racial and feminist groups, the Gay Activists Alliance (GAA) focused more on gay rights.

Gay activists in 1969 sought end of police arrests for same-sex public displays of affection (PDA). They also clamored for an end to firings and employment reprisals for being gay. In 1973, Sylvia Rivera gives a speech saying, "I have been thrown in jail. I have lost my job. I have lost my apartment for gay liberation."

== Cast and characters ==
- Billy Porter as narrator

Episode 1

- Cheyenne Jackson as Dale Jennings
- Anthony Rapp as Harry Hay
- Shannon Purser as Del Martin
- Heather Matarazzo as Phyllis Lyon
- Sara Gilbert as J.M. from Cleveland
- Anne Ramsay as The FBI Agent
- Hal Call
- Barbara Gittings
- Ernestine Eckstein
- Frank Kameny

Episode 2

- Alexandra Grey as Lucy Hicks Anderson
- Theo Germaine as Jack Starr
- Jamie Clayton as Christine Jorgensen
- Isis King as Alexis

Episode 3

- Samira Wiley as Lorraine Hansberry
- Jai Rodriguez as José Sarria
- Keiynan Lonsdale as Bayard Rustin

Episode 4

- Hailie Sahar as Sylvia Rivera
- Scott Turner Schofield as Craig Rodwell
- Cole Doman as Mark Segal
- Elizabeth Ludlow as Stormé DeLarverie
- Gale Harold as Howard Smith
- Sam Pancake as Dick Leitsch
- Martha Shelley

== Production ==
=== Development ===
On October 16, 2019, it was announced that HBO Max had commissioned an LGBTQ+ historical docuseries consisting of four hour-long episodes from Warner Horizon Unscripted Television. It is the first production from the company's documentary series unit.

The show's executive producers are David Collins, Michael Williams, Rob Eric, and Joel Chiodi (Scout Productions); Greg Berlanti and Sarah Schechter (Berlanti Productions); Jim Parsons and Todd Spiewak (That's Wonderful Productions); Jon Jashni (Raintree Ventures); and Mike Darnell and Brooke Karzen (Warner Horizon Unscripted Television). Diane Becker and Melanie Miller are also producers.

The series premiered on October 22, 2020, in observance of LGBT History Month.

=== Crew ===
Equal's showrunner is Stephen Kijak, who also directs episodes one, three and four. Kimberly Reed directs episode two.

=== Casting ===
On August 25, 2020, the casting of Samira Wiley, Cheyenne Jackson, Anthony Rapp, Sara Gilbert, Alexandra Grey, Shannon Purser, Heather Matarazzo, Jamie Clayton, Isis King, and Gale Harold was announced.

== Reception ==
The show received positive critical reception. It holds a 83% on review aggregator Rotten Tomatoes. Inkoo Kang wrote for The Hollywood Reporter, "In celebrating a movement whose foremothers and forefathers’ names have yet to enter the common lexicon, Equal is a valuable if glossy resource."

== See also ==
- Stonewall Uprising, PBS documentary
