= Moonshot (2022 film) =

2022 American film by Christopher Winterbauer

- Original release poster
- Directed by: Christopher Winterbauer
- Written by: Max Taxe
- Produced by: Greg Berlanti; Sarah Schechter; Jill McElroy; Jenna Sarkin
- Starring: Cole Sprouse; Lana Condor; Mason Gooding; Emily Rudd; Zach Braff
- Cinematography: Brendan Uegama
- Edited by: Harry Jierjian
- Music by: David Boman
- Production companies: New Line Cinema; Berlanti-Schechter Films; Entertainment 360
- Distributed by: Warner Bros. Pictures
- Release date: March 31, 2022
- Running time: 104 minutes
- Country: United States
- Language: English

Moonshot is a 2022 American science-fiction romantic comedy film directed by Christopher Winterbauer and written by Max Taxe. It stars Cole Sprouse, Lana Condor, Mason Gooding, Emily Rudd, and Zach Braff. The plot follows a college student (Condor) who helps a barista (Sprouse) sneak on board a space shuttle to Mars. The film was released on HBO Max on March 31, 2022, and was removed from the service in July.

== Plot ==
In 2049, Walt works as a barista on a college campus. He applies 37 times to the Kovi Industries Student Mars Program, which sends college students to Mars. At a college party, he meets Sophie, a no-nonsense student whose boyfriend Calvin is on Mars, and falls in love with Ginny, a student who is sent to Mars the next morning. A few weeks later, Sophie appears at Walt's cafe, in tears because Calvin has chosen a longer stay on Mars. Walt convinces her to buy a ticket on the next shuttle launch, then manipulates her into helping him sneak on board. He claims to be Calvin to keep his identity secret.

Over the course of the trip to Mars, the two grow closer; Walt learns more about Calvin, and Sophie learns the real Calvin may have been putting her second behind his dreams of terraforming Mars. During an onboard presentation, Walt is forced to give a presentation about terraforming, a topic he knows nothing about, but convinces two passengers to get married as his speech about love moves the audience, Sophie included.

As the shuttle approaches Mars, she tells him that she is staying with Calvin and will not help him get to Mars anymore, causing Walt to call her a coward. On Mars, Sophie and Calvin reunite while security arrests Walt. Awaiting his trial, Ginny tells Walt that she found someone new on Mars due to their one-night romance and his subsequent need to find her too off-putting for her to handle. The next day, Walt meets the leader of the Mars program, Leon Kovi, who tells Walt that his company knew about everything he was doing through security cameras on the shuttle and let it slide as a security test, with the program's board of trustees planning to sue Walt once he returned to Earth. Due to his dislike of the board, Kovi leaked the security footage and it went viral online back on Earth. To avoid backlash, Leon offers Walt a contract to avoid any legal problems and stay on Mars if he promotes the company, to which Walt agrees.

As his life as a barista and online sensation unfold, Walt realizes he is not happy living on Mars. Similarly, realizing she has grown apart from Calvin and his goals, Sophie breaks up with him and boards a ship back to Earth. Seeing his life becoming a pawn for Kovi, Walt also boards the shuttle back to Earth, where he reunites with Sophie and the two share a kiss.

== Cast ==
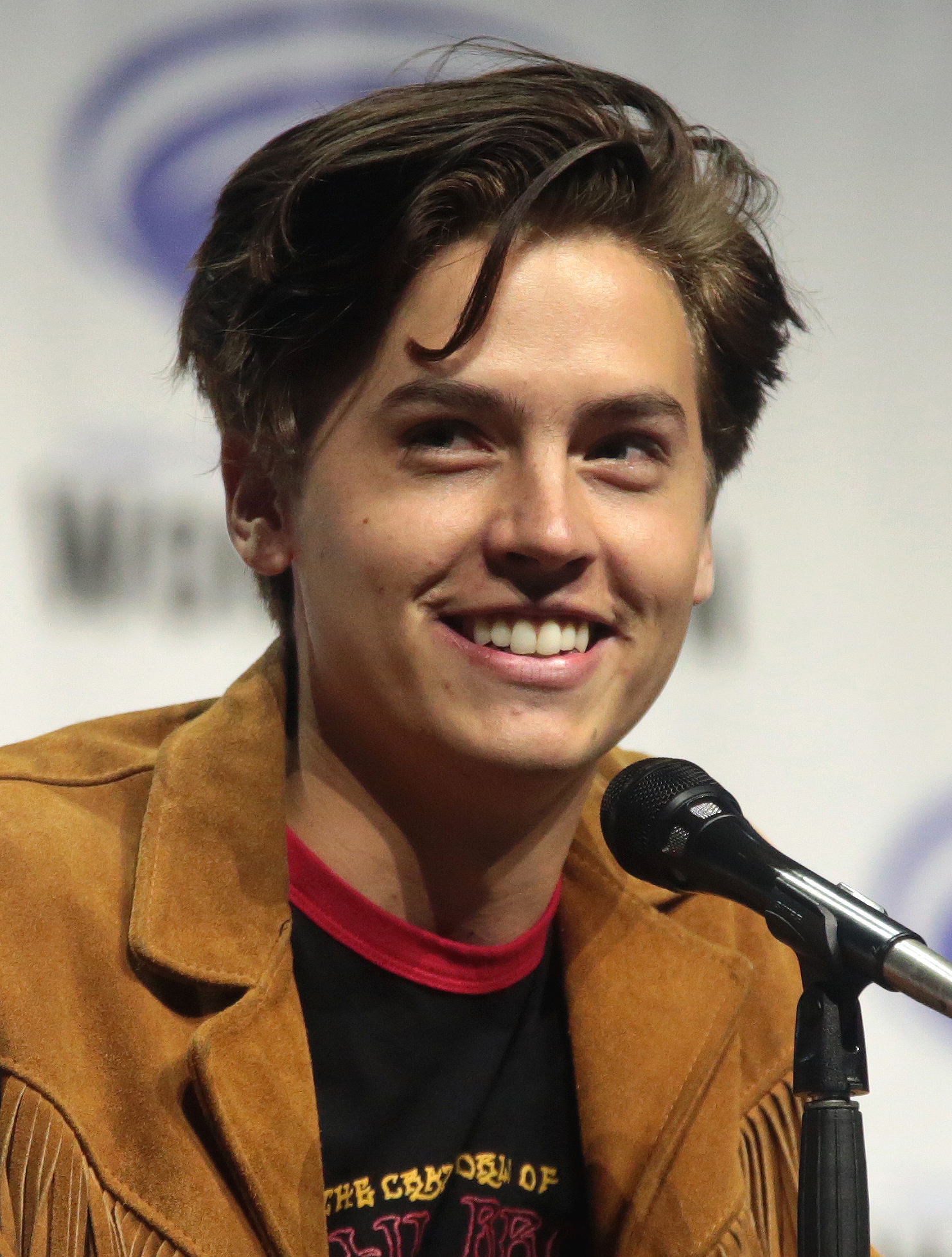
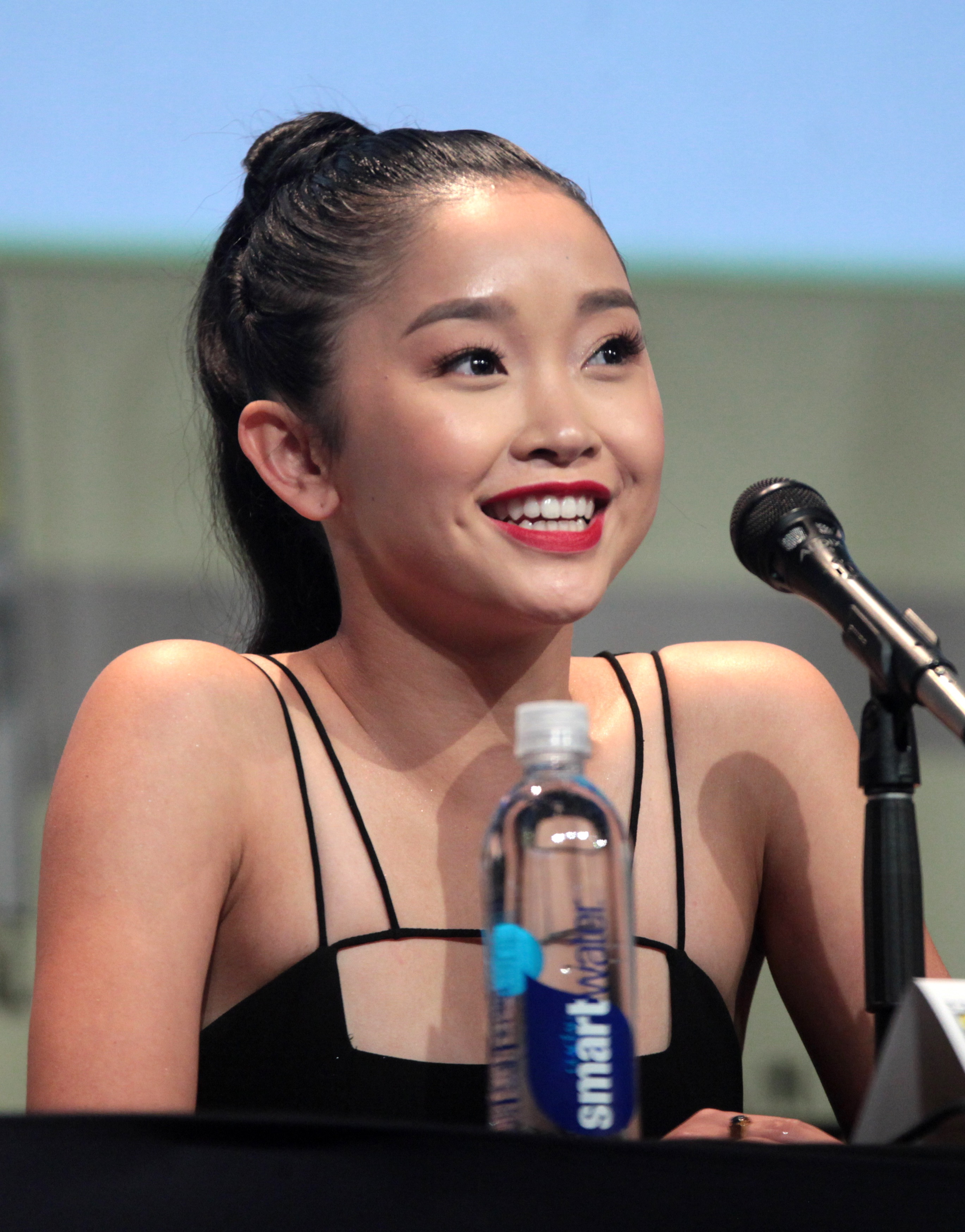
The film stars Cole Sprouse and Lana Condor.
- Cole Sprouse as Walt
- Lana Condor as Sophie Tsukino
- Mason Gooding as Calvin Riggs
- Emily Rudd as Ginny
- Christine Adams as Jan
- Michelle Buteau as Captain Tarter
- Zach Braff as Leon Kovi
- Cameron Esposito as Tabby
- Sunita Deshpande as Celeste
- Davey Johnson as Earl
- Lukas Gage as Dalton

In addition, Peter Woodward provides the voice of Gary the robot.

== Production ==
Moonshot is the second film in a four-film deal between HBO Max and the production company Berlanti-Schechter Films. It was shot in Atlanta, Georgia.

== Release ==
The film was released on HBO Max on March 31, 2022. It was originally scheduled for March 24.

== Reception ==
On the review aggregator website Rotten Tomatoes, 64% of 28 critics' reviews are positive, with an average rating of 5.9/10. The website's critical consensus reads, "It's surprisingly ordinary for a romcom set in space, but Lana Condor's performance helps Moonshot hit the target more often than not." Metacritic, which uses a weighted average, assigned the film a score of 58 out of 100 based on seven critics, indicating "mixed or average reviews". While some critics called the film predictable, others said it was entertaining and worth watching. They also praised the performances of Sprouse and Condor as well as Winterbauer's direction.

== See also ==
- List of films set on Mars
