= Sara Gilbert =

American actress (born 1975)

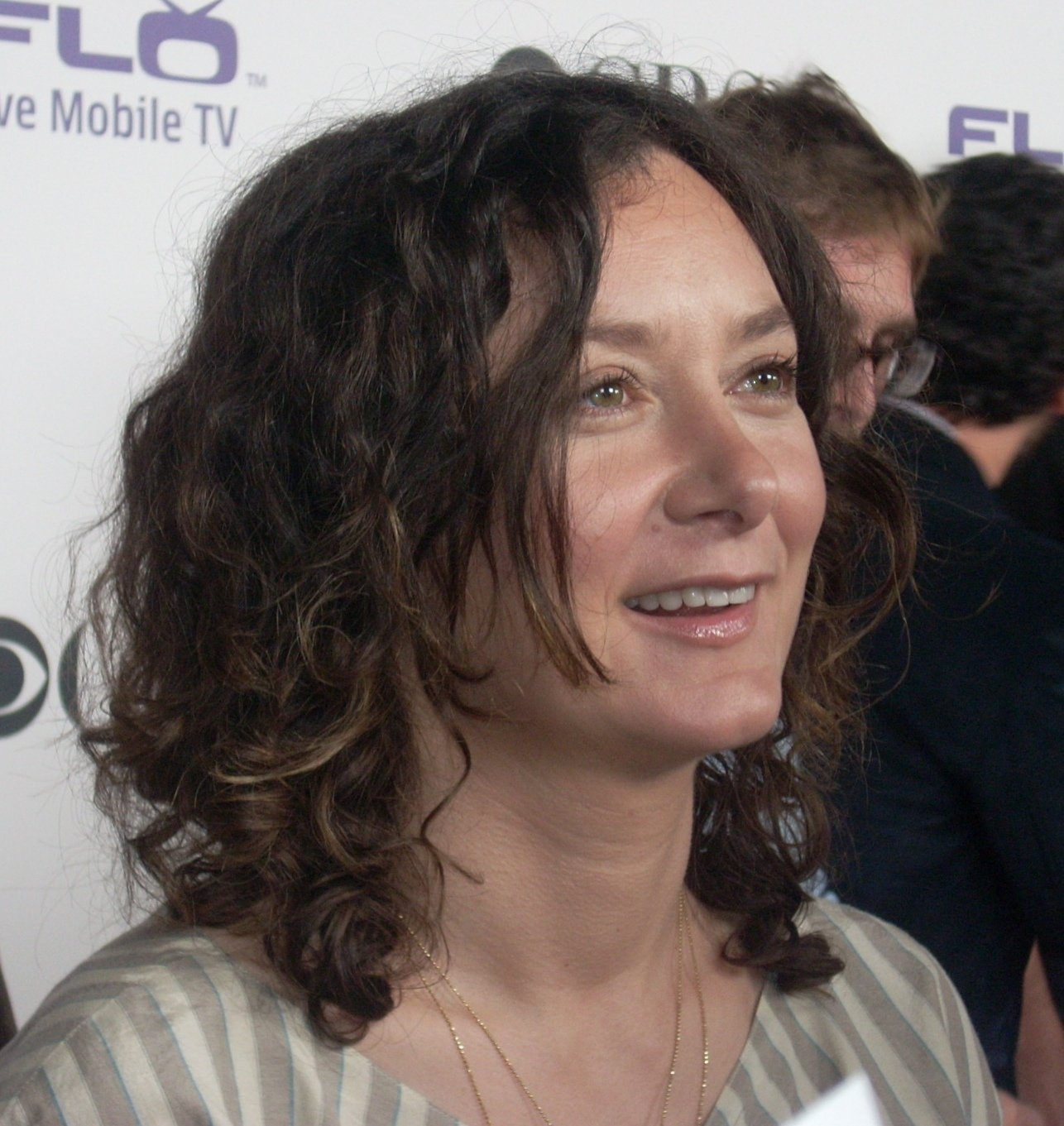
- Gilbert in 2008
- Born: Sara Rebecca Abeles; January 29, 1975 (age 51); Santa Monica, California, U.S.
- Education: Yale University
- Occupation: Actress
- Years active: 1984–present
- Spouse: Linda Perry (m. 2014; div. 2019)
- Partner: Ali Adler (2001–2011)
- Children: 3
- Relatives: Harry Crane (grandfather); Jonathan Gilbert (adoptive half brother); Melissa Gilbert (adoptive half sister)

Sara Gilbert (born Sara Rebecca Abeles, January 29, 1975) is an American actress best known for portraying Darlene Conner on Roseanne (1988–97; 2018) and its sequel, The Conners (2018–25), a role for which she received two Primetime Emmy Award nominations. She created and was a co-host of the CBS daytime talk show The Talk, and had the recurring role of Leslie Winkle on CBS's The Big Bang Theory.

== Early life and education ==
Gilbert was born Sara Rebecca Abeles in Santa Monica, California, the daughter of Barbara Cowan (née Crane) and Harold Abeles. Both her parents are Jewish. Her maternal grandfather was The Honeymooners co-creator Harry Crane. Gilbert has two older half-siblings and two older adopted siblings. Her adopted siblings on her mother's side, Melissa Gilbert and Jonathan Gilbert, were stars of Little House on the Prairie. In 1984, Sara took the last name Gilbert from Paul Gilbert, her mother's first husband. Gilbert also has two siblings on her father's side, sister Patrice and brother Joseph.

Gilbert graduated from Yale University in 1997, with honors, majoring in art with an emphasis on photography.

== Career ==
=== Television ===
Following appearances in television movies and a commercial for Kool-Aid, at 13 she landed the role of sarcastic middle child Darlene Conner in Roseanne. Gilbert was a cast member in the show's nine-year run (1988–97), for which she wrote a fourth-season episode story (the teleplay was written by the Guild Writers for the show) called "Don't Make Me Over". Her contribution was considered so important to Roseanne that the show's producers juggled storylines and taping schedules to allow her to study at Yale University while remaining in the cast, shooting remote segments of Darlene at a soundstage in New York.

Gilbert has appeared on The Simpsons, 24, Will & Grace, Law & Order: Special Victims Unit and Private Practice. Starting in 2004, she had a recurring role as smart and sarcastic medical student Jane Figler on the long-running hospital drama ER; her appearances spanned seasons 11–13.

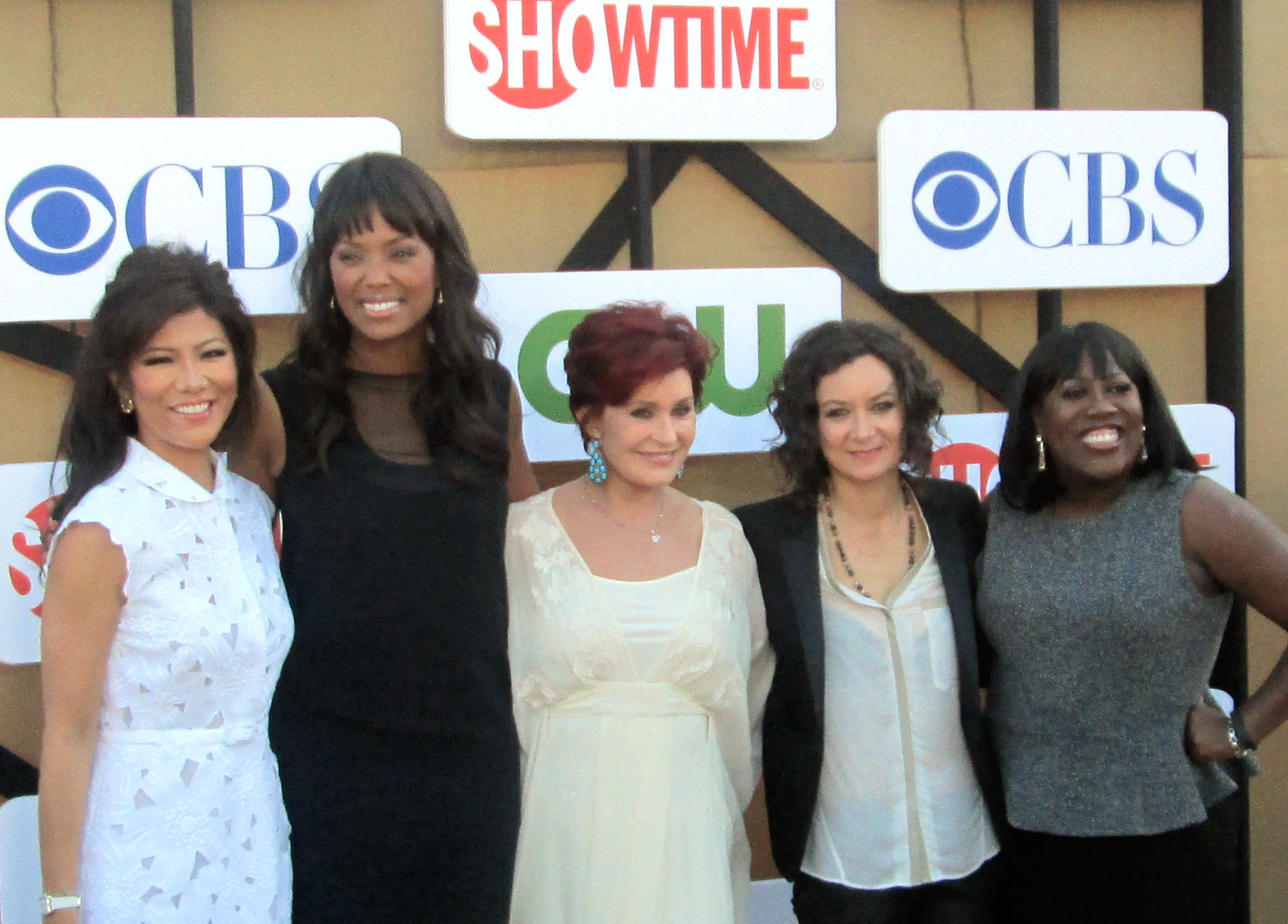
The Talk co-hosts Julie Chen, Aisha Tyler, Sharon Osbourne, Gilbert and Sheryl Underwood in 2012.

Gilbert regained a regular spot on prime time television in the fall of 2005 in the sitcom Twins on The WB network. The show was canceled after one season, when the WB and UPN networks merged as The CW and dropped a number of series. She also had a recurring role on the short-lived CBS sitcom The Class as Fern Velch.

From 2007 to 2010, Gilbert appeared in episodes of the CBS TV series The Big Bang Theory as Leslie Winkle, a scientist friend of Leonard Hofstadter. Hofstadter was played by Johnny Galecki, who had previously played Gilbert's love interest David Healy on Roseanne. In the second episode of the second season of The Big Bang Theory, Gilbert was elevated to the show's main cast, portraying again a potential love interest of Galecki's character, and at one point a love interest to Howard Wolowitz (Simon Helberg). By January 2009, it was announced that the writers did not know how to write for her character full-time, and her status was reduced from regular to recurring. Winkle was discontinued after Amy Farrah Fowler and Bernadette Rostenkowski became prominent characters.

Gilbert was a co-host and executive producer of The Talk, a talk show that premiered October 18, 2010. Gilbert won a Daytime Emmy in 2016 for Outstanding Entertainment Talk Show as producer and creator of the show. Her final appearance as co-host was August 2, 2019.

An eight-episode revival series of Roseanne was developed, with Gilbert as an executive producer. The eight episodes, picked up by ABC, began airing March 27, 2018. Due to the revival's strong ratings and positive critical reception, a second season was announced. However, on May 29, 2018, in the wake of controversial remarks made by Roseanne Barr on Twitter regarding Valerie Jarrett (an advisor to former president Barack Obama), ABC cancelled the revival after a single season. Gilbert distanced herself and the show from Barr's tweets.

On June 21, 2018, ABC announced that the network had ordered ten episodes of a spin-off of Roseanne. That series, The Conners, featuring all of the regular cast except Barr, premiered in October 2018, with Gilbert starring and serving as an executive producer. Gilbert would continue to reprise her role as Darlene and also serve as an executive producer for The Conners until the series concluded in 2025. In 2019, Gilbert and Tom Werner, both of whom had been involved in the production of The Conners (she through her TV arm, he through Werner Entertainment), formed the production company Sara+Tom. Sara + Tom was involved in the production of the eight-episode streaming sitcom The Pradeeps of Pittsburgh.

=== Film ===
Gilbert appeared alongside Drew Barrymore in the films Poison Ivy (1992) and Riding in Cars with Boys (2001). Gilbert also had a feature role in Light It Up in (1999). After the initial run of Roseanne she had several minor roles, including the short film $30 (aka 30 Bucks) as part of the Boys Life 3 feature, and High Fidelity. She directed her short film Persona Non Grata in 1998. In 2000, Gilbert appeared in a production of The Hot L Baltimore as part of the Williamstown (Mass.) theater festival.

== Personal life ==
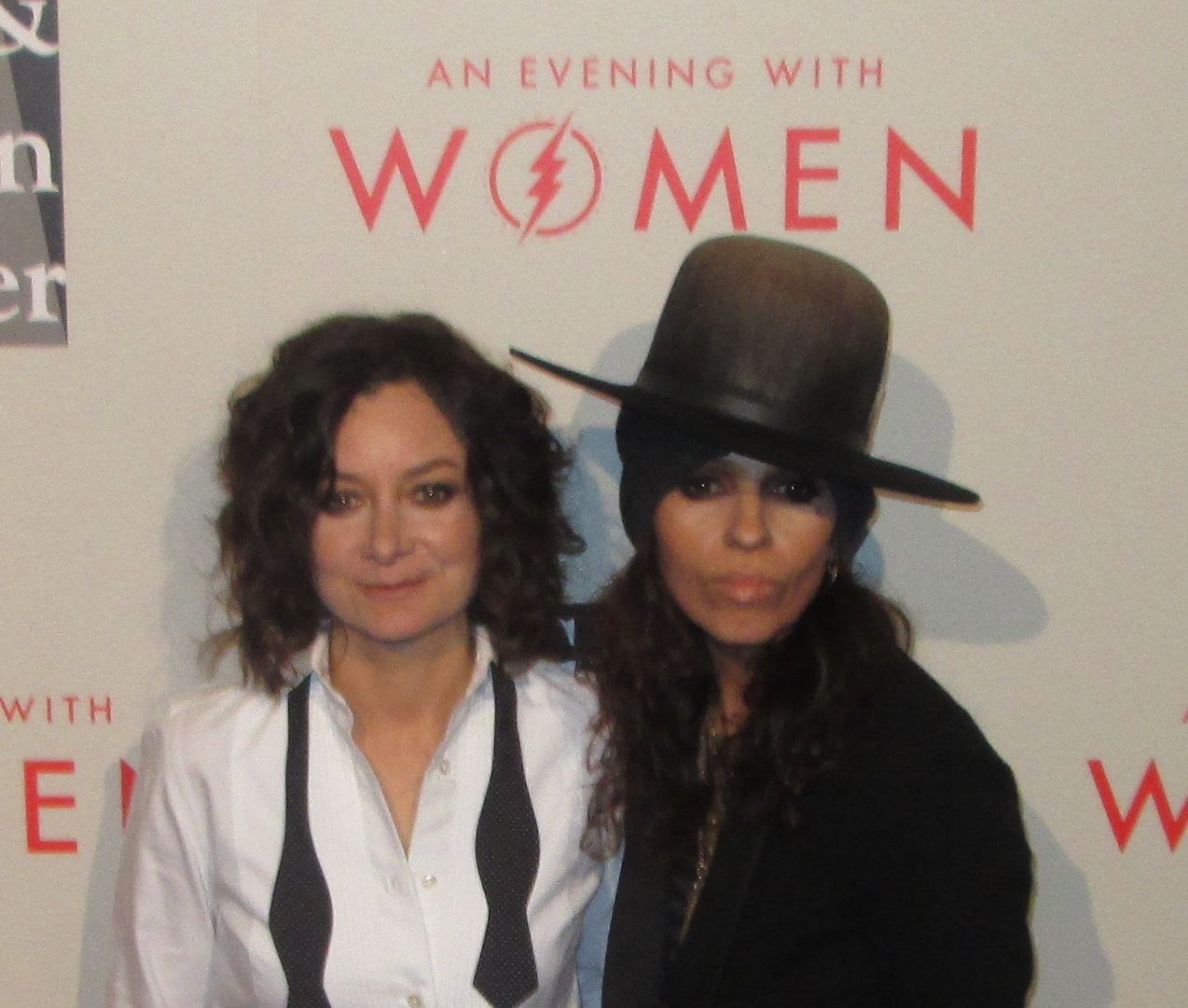
Gilbert with her wife Linda Perry at the Los Angeles LGBT Center's An Evening with Women event in 2014

As a teenager, Gilbert dated her Roseanne (and later The Big Bang Theory) co-star Johnny Galecki (their characters also dated). During their relationship, she realized she was a lesbian. She remains close friends with Galecki.

In 2001, Gilbert began a relationship with television producer Ali Adler. They have two children: a son, born to Adler in October 2004, and a daughter, born to Gilbert in August 2007. For many years, Gilbert remained private about her sexuality, choosing not to publicly discuss her personal life. In July 2010, as she prepared to launch her talk show, The Talk, Gilbert confirmed that she was a lesbian. In August 2011, Gilbert announced that she and Adler had separated amicably.

Following the breakup, Gilbert began a relationship with songwriter, music producer and former 4 Non Blondes frontwoman Linda Perry. Gilbert announced their engagement in April 2013, and the pair married on March 30, 2014. Gilbert gave birth to their son on February 28, 2015. On December 27, 2019, Gilbert filed for legal separation from Perry.

== Filmography ==
=== Film ===
Year	Title	Role	Notes
1992	Poison Ivy	Sylvie Cooper	Nominated — Independent Spirit Award for Best Supporting Actress
1994	Dead Beat	Martha	Film is based on the killings of Charles Schmid.
1997	Walkin' on Sunshine: The Movie	Neural Nurse 256	
1998	$30	Emily / Michelle	Short film
1999	Desert Blue	Sandy	
1999	Light It Up	Lynn Sabatini	
1999	The Big Tease	Gretle Dickens	
2000	High Fidelity	Anaugh Moss	
2000	Boys Life 3	Emily/Michelle	Short film; Segment: "$30"
2001	Riding in Cars with Boys	Tina Barr	
2004	Laws of Attraction	Gary Gadget's Assistant	Cameo
2023	80 for Brady	Sara	

=== Television ===
Year	Title	Role	Notes
1984	Calamity Jane	Jean	TV movie
1988	ABC Weekend Special	Stephie	Episode: "Runaway Ralph"
1988–1997; 2018	Roseanne	Darlene Conner-Healy	190 episodes Executive producer 2x Young Artist Award for Outstanding Young Comedienne in a Television Series; TV Land Award for Innovator Award; Nominated — Primetime Emmy Award for Outstanding Supporting Actress in a Comedy Series (1993–1994); Nominated — TV Land Award for Character Most Desperately in Need of a Timeout; Nominated — Young Artist Award for Best Young Actress Supporting Role in a Television Series
1989	A&E's An Evening at the Improv	Herself	Season 4, Episode 6
1990	Sudie and Simpson	Sudie Harrigan	TV movie Young Artist Award for Best Young Actress in a Cable Special
1992; 1994	The Simpsons	Laura Powers (voice)	Episodes: "New Kid on the Block" and "Another Simpsons Clip Show" (archival recordings)
1994	Saturday Night Live	Herself – Host	Episode: "Sara Gilbert/Counting Crows"
1996	ABC Afterschool Special	Jessie	Episode: "Me and My Hormones"
1997	Broken Record		TV movie
2000–2001	Welcome to New York	Amy Manning	13 episodes
2002	Rugrats	Cindy (voice)	Episode: "Cynthia Comes Alive/Trading Phil"
2002	24	Paula Schaeffer	5 episodes, Season 2
2003	Will & Grace	Cheryl	Episode: "Fanilow"
2004	Strong Medicine	Charlayne	Episode: "Cinderella in Scrubs"
2004–2007	ER	Dr. Jane Figler	15 episodes
2005	In the Game		Unsold TV pilot
2005	The Clinic	Mrs. Jennings	Episode: 3.1
2005–2006	Twins	Mitchee Arnold	Lead role
2006	Girls on the Bus	Helen	Episode: "Pilot"
2006–2007	The Class	Fern Velch	6 episodes
2007	Private Practice	Kelly	Episode: "In Which Sam Gets Taken For a Ride"
2007–2010; 2016	The Big Bang Theory	Leslie Winkle	Recurring role (season 1); Main role (season 2); Guest role (seasons 3, 9)
2008	Law & Order: Special Victims Unit	Caitlyn Ryan	Episode: "Trials"
2010	HawthoRNe	Malia Price	3 episodes
2010	Grey's Anatomy	Kim	Episode: "Suicide is Painless"
2010–2019	The Talk	Herself	Also creator and executive producer
2014	Bad Teacher	Irene Dudek	Main role
2016	Supergirl	Herself	Episode: "Falling"
2018	Jane the Virgin	Herself	Episode: "Chapter Seventy-Four"
2018	Living Biblically	Cheryl	Main role
2018–2025	The Conners	Darlene Conner-Healy	Main role; 112 episodes
2019	Weird City	Jathryn	Episode: "Smart House"
2019	Atypical	Professor Judd	Recurring role (season 3)
2020	Equal	J.M. From Cleveland	Docuseries
2027	Scooby-Doo: Origins	TBA	Post-production
TBA	The People v. Gorilla Grodd	TBA	Filming

Media offices
First	The Talk co-host 2010–2019	Succeeded by Marie Osmond
