= Dreamworld =

Dreamworld or Dream World may refer to:

== Amusement parks ==
- Dreamworld (Australia), a theme park on the Gold Coast, Queensland, Australia
- Dream World (Thailand), an amusement park in Thanyaburi District, Pathum Thani Province, Thailand

== Music ==
- Dreamworld (band), a Swedish group 1995–1997
- "Dreamworld" (Midnight Oil song), 1988
- "Dreamworld" (Robin Thicke song), 2009
- "Dream World", a song by the Monkees from the 1968 album The Birds, The Bees & The Monkees
- "Dream World", a song by ABBA from the 2004 Thank You for the Music box set
- "Dreamworld", a song by Rilo Kiley from the 2007 album Under the Blacklight
- "Dreamworld", a bonus track by Big Time Rush from the 2023 album Another Life

== Concert tours ==
- “Dreamworld: The Greatest Hits Live”, a concert tour by Pet Shop Boys

== Other uses ==
- Dream world (plot device), in fictional works
- Dreamworld, a dimension in the Dream Cycle fiction of H. P. Lovecraft
- Pokémon Dream World, part of Pokémon Black and White video games

== See also ==
- Dream
- Dreamland (disambiguation)
- DreamWorks Pictures, an American film production company
- Fictional universe
