= Berlanti Productions =

American film and television production company

- Formerly: Berlanti-Liddell Productions (2000–06); Berlanti Television (2006–11)
- Type: Private
- Industry: Production company
- Founded: 2000; 26 years ago
- Founders: Greg Berlanti; Mickey Liddell
- Key people: Greg Berlanti (CEO & Partner); Sarah Schechter (Partner); Leigh London Redman (president)
- Services: Film production; Television production
- Divisions: Berlanti-Schechter Films

Berlanti Productions (formerly known as Berlanti-Liddell Productions and Berlanti Television) is an American film and television production company founded by screenwriter, producer and filmmaker Greg Berlanti and producer Mickey Liddell in 2000.

== History ==
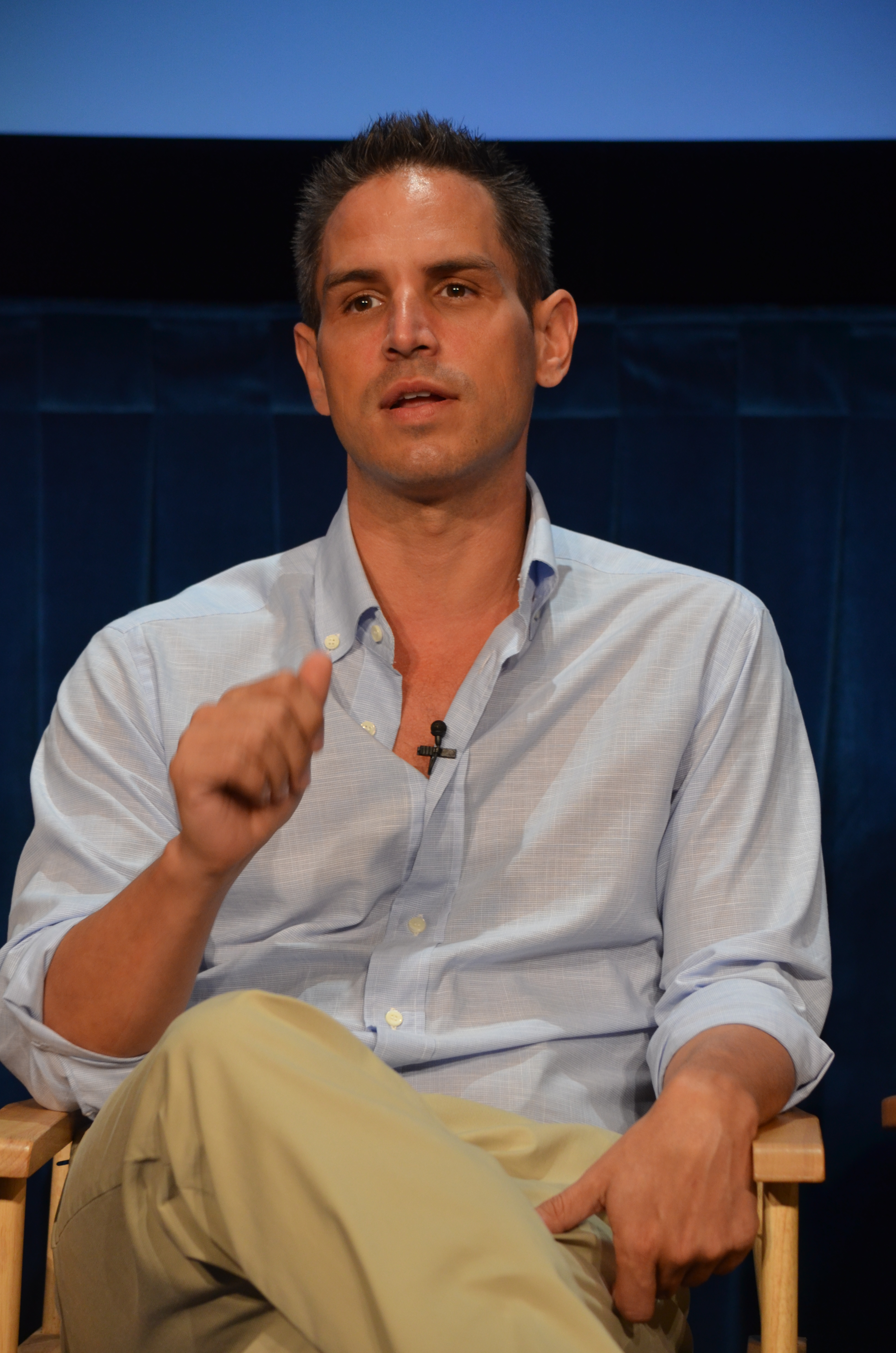
The company's co-founder Greg Berlanti in 2012

The company was founded in 2000 as Berlanti-Liddell Productions by screenwriter, producer and filmmaker Greg Berlanti and producer Mickey Liddell.

In March 2003, the company signed a three-year deal with Warner Bros. Television. In February 2006, the company signed a three-year overall deal with Touchstone Television. In August 2006, Liddell left the company, and the company was renamed to Berlanti Television. In July 2008, the company re-signed its overall deal with ABC Studios (formally Touchstone Television) for an additional five-year deal. In March 2011, the company signed a four-year overall deal with Warner Bros. Television, ending its overall deal with ABC Studios two years early. The company also changed its name to Berlanti Productions to reflect its television and film divisions combining.

In February 2014, Sarah Schechter became the company's president, overseeing the development and production of the company's television and film projects. Before joining the company, Schechter was a senior production vice president at Warner Bros.

In June 2018, the company entered a six-year overall development and production deal with Warner Bros. Television Group until 2024.

In February 2020, David Madden joined the company as its new president, taking over from the company's former president Sarah Schechter. Schechter moved to the newly created positions of chairwoman and partner. Before joining the company, Madden was the former president of AMC Networks and Fox Broadcasting Company.

In August 2021, Dannah Shinder joined the company as executive vice president of television. Before joining the company, Shinder was senior vice president of television at Elizabeth Banks' Brownstone Productions. In January 2022, Suzanne Gomez joined the company as chief marketing officer, and head of talent relations. Gomez was previously senior vice president of publicity at The CW, a position she held since the inception of the network in 2006.

In January 2023, the company signed a four-year exclusive overall deal for Berlanti Productions to remain at the Warner Bros. studio for its television operations into the year 2027 with Warner Bros. Television Group.

== Filmography ==
=== Film ===
Year	Title	Director	Gross (worldwide)	Distributor	Notes	Ref.
2015	Pan	Joe Wright	$128.4 million	Warner Bros. Pictures	with RatPac-Dune Entertainment	
2020	Deathstroke: Knights & Dragons: The Movie	Sung Jin Ahn	—N/a	Warner Bros. Home Entertainment	with Blue Ribbon Content, DC Entertainment, and Warner Bros. Animation	
2021	Free Guy	Shawn Levy	$331.5 million	Walt Disney Studios Motion Pictures	with 20th Century Studios, 21 Laps Entertainment and Maximum Effort	

=== Television ===
==== Former ====
Year	Title	Network	Notes	Ref.
2002–2006	Everwood	The WB	with Warner Bros. Television	
2004–2005	Jack & Bobby	The WB	with Shoe Money Productions and Warner Bros. Television	
2006–2011	Brothers & Sisters	ABC	with After Portsmouth Productions and ABC Studios	
2007–2009	Dirty Sexy Money	ABC	with ABC Studios	
2008–2009	Eli Stone	ABC	with ABC Studios	
2010–2011	No Ordinary Family	ABC	with Oh That Gus!, Inc. and ABC Studios	
2012	Political Animals	USA Network	with Laurence Mark Productions and Warner Horizon Television	
2012–2020	Arrow	The CW	with Bonanza Productions, DC Entertainment and Warner Bros. Television	
2013	Golden Boy	CBS	with Bonanza Productions, Nicholas Wootton Productions and Warner Bros. Television	
2013–2014	The Tomorrow People	The CW	with Bonanza Productions, FremantleMedia North America, CBS Television Studios, and Warner Bros. Television	
2014–2016	The Mysteries of Laura	NBC	with Jeff Rake Productions, Kapital Entertainment, New Media Vision, and Warner Bros. Television	
2014–2023	The Flash	The CW	with Bonanza Productions, DC Entertainment, and Warner Bros. Television	
2015–2020	Blindspot	NBC	with Quinn's House and Warner Bros. Television	
2015–2021	Supergirl	CBS; The CW	with DC Entertainment and Warner Bros. Television	
2016–2022	Legends of Tomorrow	The CW	with Bonanza Productions, DC Entertainment and Warner Bros. Television	
2017–2023	Riverdale	The CW	with Archie Comics, CBS Studios, and Warner Bros. Television	
2018	Deception	ABC	with VHPT Company and Warner Bros. Television	
2018–2026	All American	The CW	with April Blair's Company (season 1), CBS Studios, and Warner Bros. Television	
2018–2021	Black Lightning	The CW	with Akil Productions, DC Entertainment, and Warner Bros. Television	
2018–2025	You	Lifetime; Netflix	with Man Sewing Dinosaur, Alloy Entertainment, A&E Studios, Warner Horizon Television (seasons 1–2), and Warner Bros. Television (season 3–5)	
2018–2020	God Friended Me	CBS	with I Have an Idea! Entertainment, CBS Television Studios, and Warner Bros. Television	
2018–2023	Titans	DC Universe; HBO Max	with Weed Road Pictures, DC Entertainment, and Warner Bros. Television	
2018–2020	Chilling Adventures of Sabrina	Netflix	with Archie Comics, Muckle Man Productions (season 2), and Warner Bros. Television	
2019	The Red Line	CBS	with Array Filmworks, Forward Movement, CBS Television Studios, and Warner Bros. Television	
2019–2021	Prodigal Son	Fox	with Sklaverworth Productions, VHPT! Co., Warner Bros. Television, and Fox Entertainment	
2019–2023	Doom Patrol	DC Universe; HBO Max; Max	with Jeremy Carver Productions, DC Entertainment, and Warner Bros. Television	
2019–2022	Batwoman	The CW	with DC Entertainment and Warner Bros. Television	
2020–2022	Stargirl	DC Universe; The CW	with Mad Ghost Productions, DC Entertainment, and Warner Bros. Television Studios	
2020	Katy Keene	The CW	with Archie Comics, CBS Television Studios, and Warner Bros. Television	
2020	Helter Skelter: An American Myth	Epix	with Rogue Atlas Productions and Warner Horizon Unscripted Television	
2020	Equal	HBO Max	with Scout Productions, Raintree Ventures, That's Wonderful Productions, and Warner Horizon Unscripted Television	
2020–2022	The Flight Attendant	HBO Max	with Yes, Norman Productions and Warner Bros. Television Studios	
2021–2023	Kung Fu	The CW	with Quinn's House (seasons 1–2), Kinga Productions (season 3), and Warner Bros. Television	
2021–2024	Superman & Lois	The CW	with DC Entertainment and Warner Bros. Television Studios	
2022–2024	All American: Homecoming	The CW	with Rock My Soul Productions, CBS Studios, and Warner Bros. Television	
2023	Gotham Knights	The CW	with DC Entertainment and Warner Bros. Television	
2023–2025	Found	NBC	with Rock My Soul Productions, Warner Bros. Television, and Universal Television	
2024	The Girls on the Bus	Max	with Tsiporah and Warner Bros. Television	
2024	Dead Boy Detectives	Netflix	with Ghost Octopus, DC Entertainment, and Warner Bros. Television	
2024–2026	Brilliant Minds	NBC	with 1107 Productions, 72nd Street, Fabel Entertainment, The Imaginarium, Universal Television, and Warner Bros. Television	

==== In Development ====
- How To Survive Without Me (with Warner Bros. Television)
- Stillwater (with Skybound Entertainment and Warner Bros. Television)
- Scooby-Doo: Origins (with Midnight Radio and Warner Bros. Television)

=== Web series ===
Year	Title	Website / Network	Notes	Ref.
2015–2016	Vixen	CW Seed	with Blue Ribbon Content, DC Entertainment, and Warner Bros. Animation	
2017–2018	Freedom Fighters: The Ray	CW Seed	with Blue Ribbon Content, DC Entertainment, and Warner Bros. Animation	
2018–2019	Constantine: City of Demons	CW Seed	with Phantom Four Films, Digital eMation, Blue Ribbon Content, DC Entertainment, and Warner Bros. Animation	
2020	Deathstroke: Knights & Dragons	CW Seed	with Blue Ribbon Content, DC Entertainment, and Warner Bros. Animation	

== Berlanti-Schechter Films ==
Berlanti-Schechter Films was founded in 2020 by Greg Berlanti and Sarah Schechter, and is a subsidiary of Berlanti Productions. In July 2021, the company signed a first-look feature film deal at Netflix.

Year	Title	Director	Gross (worldwide)	Distributor	Notes	Ref.
2020	Unpregnant	Rachel Lee Goldenberg	—N/a	HBO Max	with Picturestart and Warner Max	
2022	Moonshot	Chris Winterbauer	—N/a	HBO Max	with Good Universe, Entertainment 360, Warner Bros. Pictures, and New Line Cinema	
2022	My Policeman	Michael Grandage	—N/a	Amazon Studios	with Independent Film Company, and MGC	
2023	Red, White & Royal Blue	Matthew Lopez	—N/a	Amazon Prime Video	with Amazon Studios	
2024	Atlas	Brad Peyton	—N/a	Netflix	with Safehouse Pictures, ASAP Entertainment and Nuyorican Productions	
2024	Fly Me to the Moon	Greg Berlanti	$42 million	Columbia Pictures (through Sony Pictures Releasing)	with Apple Studios and These Pictures	

=== In development ===
- Hang the Decorators (with Amazon MGM Studios)
- Sasha (with Amazon MGM Studios and These Pictures)
- Red, White & Royal Wedding (with Amazon MGM Studios)
