= David Dawson (actor) =

English actor (born 1982)

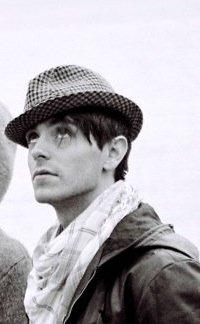
- Born: David Robert Dawson; 7 September 1982 (age 44); Widnes, Cheshire, England
- Education: Royal Academy of Dramatic Art (BA)
- Occupation: Actor
- Years active: 2003–present
- Spouse: Josh Silver (m. 2023)

David Robert Dawson (born 7 September 1982) is an English actor. On television, he is known for his roles in the BBC Four film The Road to Coronation Street (2010), the BBC One series Luther (2011), Ripper Street (2012–2016), The Last Kingdom (2015–2018) and The Secret Agent (2016), and the Channel 4 sitcom Year of the Rabbit (2019). His films include My Policeman (2022).

On stage, Dawson received a Laurence Olivier Award nomination for playing Smike in the 2007 production of The Life and Adventures of Nicholas Nickleby. Other notable performances have been in the 2009 production of Comedians, the 2010 production of Posh, and the 2011 production of Luise Miller.

== Early life ==
Dawson was born in Widnes, England, and attended Fairfield High School and Warrington Collegiate Institute before being accepted to RADA on the acting programme in 2002. While at secondary school he was a member of the Musketeer Theatre Company where he played Dogberry in William Shakespeare's Much Ado About Nothing among other roles. At 17 he wrote a play called Divorced and Desperate which ran at the Queen's Hall Theatre, Widnes, for three nights. A year later he wrote and starred in the play The Boy in the Bed at the Tower Theatre, Islington, with financial backing from Barbara Windsor and Julie Walters to whom he had written for help. Dawson has a younger brother, James.

== Roles ==
After leaving RADA in 2005, Dawson's first professional role was as understudy to Kevin Spacey as the eponymous hero of Shakespeare's Richard II for Trevor Nunn.

Dawson has appeared in the television shows Doc Martin, The Thick of It, Secret Diary of a Call Girl and Peaky Blinders. He played Harry Parr-Davies in the BBC drama Gracie! about the life of English singer Gracie Fields. He starred as Coronation Street creator Tony Warren in the BBC drama The Road to Coronation Street. He played Toby Kent in three episodes of the second series of Luther for the BBC.

In 2012, Dawson appeared in two BBC Two literary adaptations, playing Bazzard in The Mystery of Edwin Drood and Poins in The Hollow Crown. He later appeared in the first three BBC-produced series of Ripper Street. In 2016, he appeared in the BBC One's version of The Secret Agent. Dawson portrayed David Collins in the BBC Two series Banished and King Alfred in BBC America and BBC Two's historical drama series The Last Kingdom.

Scene from My Policeman featuring Harry Styles as Tom Burgess and Dawson as Patrick Hazlewood.

Dawson starred alongside Harry Styles and Emma Corrin in the 2022 film My Policeman, with critics praising his performance.

== Personal life ==
Dawson is married to author Josh Silver. _{"Lacks up-to-date information. It lacks up-to-date sources"}

== Filmography ==
=== Film ===
Year	Title	Role	Notes
2010	London Boulevard	Big Issue Seller	Uncredited
2022	All the Old Knives	Owen Lassiter	
2022	My Policeman	Patrick Hazlewood	
2026	The Flaw	The Interrogator	
2026	Elsinore	Derek Jarman	

=== Television ===
Year	Title	Role	Notes
2005	Doc Martin	Wallace	Episode: "Blood is Thicker"
2007	Damage	Tom Byrne	Television film
2007	The Thick of It	Affers	2 episodes
2009	Gracie!	Harry Parr Davies	Television film
2010	Secret Diary of a Call Girl	Byron Seebohm	7 episodes (series 3)
2010	The Road to Coronation Street	Tony Warren	Television film
2011	Luther	Toby Kent	3 episodes
2012	The Mystery of Edwin Drood	Bazzard	1 episode
2012	Henry IV, Parts I and II	Poins	TV Shakespeare adaptation
2012	Parade's End	Aranjuez	1 episode
2012–2016	Ripper Street	Fred Best	19 episodes (series 1–3; guest, series 5)
2013	Dancing on the Edge	D.I. Horton	3 episodes
2013	The Borgias	The French Ambassador	Episode: "Siblings"
2013	Peaky Blinders	Roberts	3 episodes
2014	The Smoke	Dom	1 episode
2014	The Duchess of Malfi	Ferdinand	Television film
2015	Banished	David Collins	Miniseries
2015–2018	The Last Kingdom	King Alfred	Main role (series 1–3)
2016	Maigret	Marcel Moncin	Episode: "Maigret Sets a Trap"
2016	The Secret Agent	Vladimir	Miniseries
2019	Year of the Rabbit	Joseph Merrick	4 episodes
2022	The Heroic Quest of the Valiant Prince Ivandoe	Prince Svan	Voice role - 5 episodes
2023	The Burning Girls	Aaron Marsh	Main role
2024	This Town	Robbie Carmen	6 episodes
2025	Wolf King	Vega	Voice
2026	Falling	Phil	4 episodes
2026	Living the Dream		
TBA	Hamburg Days	Bob Wooler	--

== Stage ==
Year	Production	Character	Director(s)	Company
2005	Richard II	The Groom / Understudy to Richard	Trevor Nunn	The Old Vic
2006	The Life and Adventures of Nicholas Nickleby	Smike	Jonathan Church / Philip Franks	Chichester Fest Theatre / West End / UK tour / Toronto
2006	The Long and the Short and the Tall	Whittaker	Josie Rourke	Lyceum Theatre, Sheffield
2007	The Entertainer	Frank Rice	Sean Holmes	The Old Vic
2008	Romeo and Juliet	Romeo	Neil Bartlett	Royal Shakespeare Company
2009	Comedians	Gethin Price	Sean Holmes	Lyric Theatre, Hammersmith
2010	Posh	Hugo Fraser-Tyrwhitt	Lydnsey Turner	Royal Court
2011	Luise Miller	Hofmarschall von Kalb	Michael Grandage	Donmar Warehouse
2013	The People of the Town	Antoine	Lily Bevan	Gielgud Theatre (RADA)
2013	The Vortex	Nicky Lancaster	Stephen Unwin	Rose Theatre, Kingston
2014	The Duchess of Malfi	Ferdinand	Dominic Dromgoole	Shakespeare's Globe
2015	The Dazzle	Homer Collyer	Simon Evans	Found111
2018	Aristocrats (Brian Friel)	Casimir	Lydnsey Turner	Donmar Warehouse
2019	Fairview	Mack	Nadia Latif	Young Vic Theatre

== Audio ==
Year	Title	Role
2013	To Make the Plough Go Before the Horse	Esmé Stewart
2013	Eugene Onegin	Eugene Onegin

== Awards and nominations ==
In 2008, Dawson was nominated for Best Newcomer in a Play at the Olivier Awards for his role as Smike in Nicholas Nickleby. He was also nominated in 2010 for Best Supporting Actor in the What's On Stage awards for his role as Gethin Price in Comedians.

In 2022, he and the cast of My Policeman won the TIFF tribute Award for Performance, Dawson alongside Harry Styles were also nominated at the 2023 MTV Movie & TV Awards for Best Kiss.

== Critical acclaim ==
Dawson drew critical acclaim for his portrayal of writer Tony Warren in the BBC Four drama The Road to Coronation Street. For the New Statesman Rachel Cooke wrote: "I think he's going to be a huge star. When he is doing his thing, it is hard to take your eyes off him". The Daily Express said "It is David Dawson and some perfectly judged dialogue which brings this drama to light" while The Mirror's Jane Simon called him "absolutely brilliant".
