= Greg Berlanti =

American television writer and producer (born 1972)

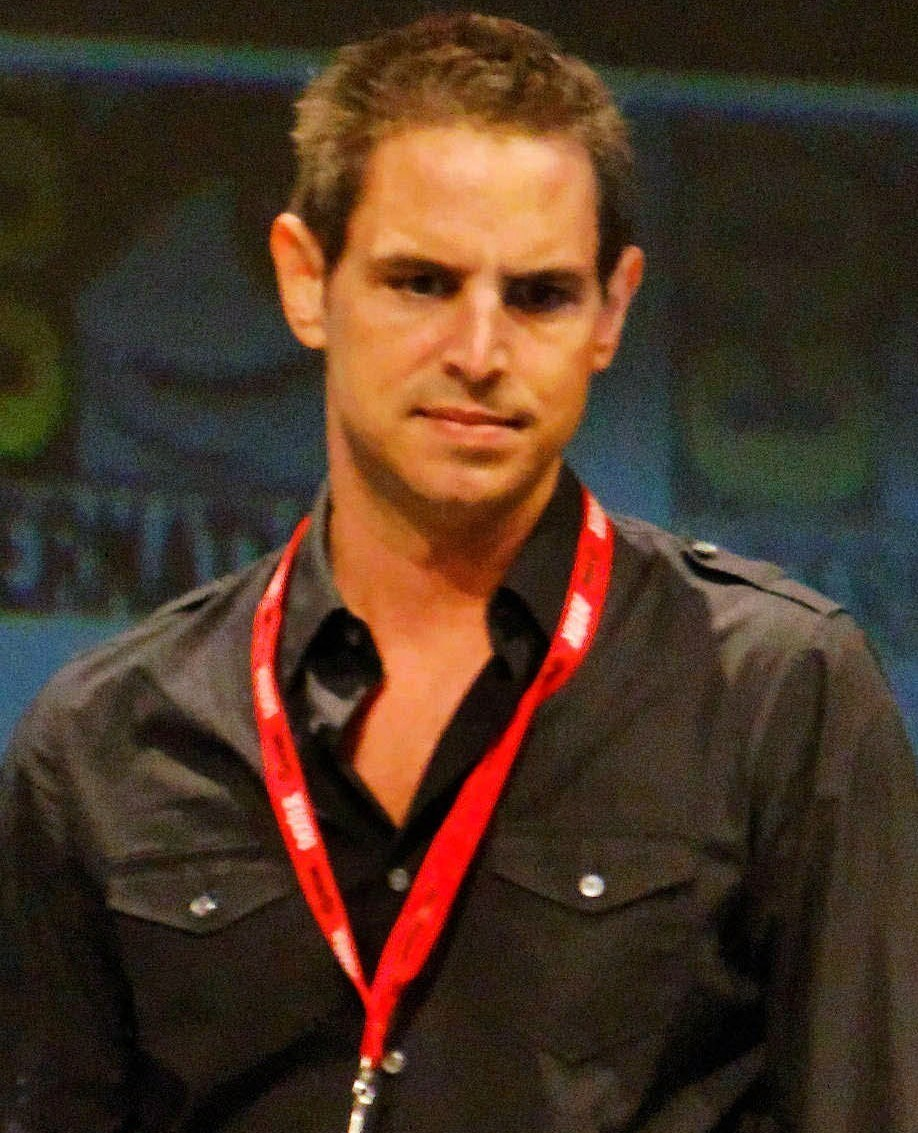
- Berlanti in 2010
- Born: Gregory Berlanti; May 24, 1972 (age 54); Suffern, New York, U.S.
- Education: Northwestern University (BS)
- Occupations: Screenwriter; producer; director
- Years active: 1998–present
- Spouse: Robbie Rogers (m. 2017)
- Children: 2

Gregory Berlanti (born May 24, 1972) is an American screenwriter, producer and director. He is known for his work on the television series Dawson's Creek, Brothers & Sisters, Everwood, Political Animals, Riverdale, Chilling Adventures of Sabrina and You, in addition to his contributions to DC Comics on film and television productions, including The CW's Arrowverse, as well as Titans and Doom Patrol. In 2000, Berlanti founded the production company Berlanti Productions.

In the 2017–18 television season, Berlanti tied Jerry Bruckheimer's 2005–06 record in having 10 different live-action scripted television series airing on various networks and digital platforms and took sole possession of the record, with 14 airing in the 2018–19 television season, having signed the most expensive producer deal at that time (June 2018) with Warner Bros. In the 2019–20 television season, with one cancellation and two new series, Berlanti increased the record to 18. Berlanti also directed the 2018 film Love, Simon, a gay romantic comedy-drama which grossed $66 million worldwide. He was an executive producer of the superhero drama television series Superman & Lois (2021–24).

Berlanti was named on Time's list of the 100 most influential people in the world in 2020.

== Career ==
In 1998, at the age of 26, Berlanti landed his first writing job on The WB's Dawson's Creek, where he quickly rose through the producing ranks from staff writer to executive producer. In 2000, when creator and then-showrunner Kevin Williamson decided to step away from the show, 28-year-old Berlanti was promoted to showrunner.

Berlanti has spoken in many interviews about the importance of introducing a gay character into a primetime television show and featuring the first same-sex kiss between two men on American network television on Dawson's Creek. Speaking with The Hollywood Reporter, he stated, "In the beginning, there was resistance. When we did the Jack kiss on Dawson's Creek, everyone was tentative. But I took over the show and that was an important thing to me. If we were going to bring the character out, it seemed silly to me that he couldn't kiss." When asked what he would have done if the network had said no to the kiss, Berlanti added, "I was prepared to quit. I really was."

Berlanti subsequently created two drama series for Warner Bros: Everwood and Jack & Bobby. He and his business partner Mickey Liddell struck a deal with Warner Bros. in March 2003 via Berlanti/Liddell Productions. By the age of 32, he had also already directed his first feature film, The Broken Hearts Club: A Romantic Comedy, which starred Timothy Olyphant, Zach Braff, Justin Theroux, and Dean Cain. After three years at Warner Bros., he moved to Touchstone Television in 2006 and set up Berlanti Television as his new production company.

In 2006, Berlanti produced and wrote Brothers & Sisters for ABC, which aired for five seasons and featured the first same-sex legal marriage on network television. He replaced Marti Noxon, who departed the show because of creative differences.

In 2007, Berlanti executive-produced Dirty Sexy Money for ABC, which aired for two seasons and featured the first recurring transgender character on primetime television.

In 2008, Berlanti created and produced the ABC legal drama Eli Stone and, in 2012, the USA miniseries Political Animals. At ABC, he produced and worked alongside Jon Harmon Feldman, former Dirty Sexy Money showrunner, to create No Ordinary Family. In 2011, he shifted from ABC Studios back to its original home at Warner Bros. Television. For NBC, he produced The Mysteries of Laura, an American adaptation of the Spanish television series, which premiered on September 17, 2014, and Blindspot, which premiered on September 21, 2015.

Berlanti directed the 2010 film Life as We Know It, starring Katherine Heigl and Josh Duhamel. He produced the film Pan for Warner Bros. under his Berlanti Productions banner; the film was released October 9, 2015.

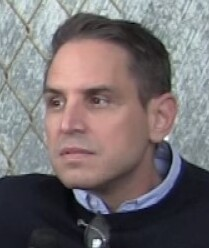
Berlanti in 2018

In January 2016, The CW ordered the Berlanti-produced television pilot Riverdale, based on the characters from Archie Comics. The pilot was picked up to series in May 2016. Riverdale premiered on January 26, 2017, and was renewed for a second season on March 7, 2017. In September 2017, it was reported that a live-action television series based on the comic book Chilling Adventures of Sabrina was in development for The CW by Warner Bros. Television and Berlanti Productions. In December 2017, the project had moved to Netflix, and the first season of Chilling Adventures of Sabrina was released on October 26, 2018. On December 18, 2018, Netflix renewed the series for a second season.

In February 2015, it was announced that Berlanti and Sera Gamble would develop a series for Showtime based on Caroline Kepnes's thriller novel You. Two years later, it was announced that the series was purchased by Lifetime and put on fast-track development. You premiered on September 9, 2018. On July 26, 2018, ahead of the series premiere, Lifetime announced that the series had been renewed for a second season. On December 3, 2018, it was confirmed that Lifetime had passed on the series and that Netflix picked up the series ahead of the release of the second season. The second season was released on December 26, 2019. On January 14, 2020, Netflix renewed You for a third season, which was released on October 15, 2021. In October 2021, ahead of the third season premiere, the series was renewed for a fourth season.

In April 2019, Amazon Studios officially won the film rights to Red, White & Royal Blue, to be produced by Berlanti Productions. The project, based on the 2019 novel of the same name by Casey McQuiston, had its world premiere at the BFI IMAX in London on July 22, 2023 and was released on Amazon Prime Video on August 11, 2023.

In May 2021, The CW pilot All American: Homecoming was picked up to series to be executive produced by Berlanti in association with creator Nkechi Okoro Carroll, Sarah Schechter, David Madden, and Robbie Rogers. All American: Homecoming premiered on The CW in February 2022. The series was canceled after three seasons, ending in September 2024.

In February 2022, Max put in a series order for The Girls on the Bus, previously worked on by Netflix and The CW, to be produced by Berlanti, Amy Chozick, Julie Plec, Rina Mimoun, and Sarah Schechter. It was announced that filming had wrapped on the pilot and production began in October 2022. The series was cancelled after one season.

In March 2022, Apple TV+ acquired the distribution rights to Fly Me to the Moon, a film covering the 1960s Space Race. In June 2022, the project's original director, Jason Bateman, left the project, and the role was later filled by Berlanti. Filming began later in the year in October, and it was released in July 2024.

More recently, his Berlanti/Schechter Films company had a first-look deal with Netflix.

=== DC Comics ===
==== Film ====
Berlanti co-wrote and co-produced the DC Comics film Green Lantern, starring Ryan Reynolds as the titular character. As the film was neither critically nor financially successful, further planned releases were cancelled.

In May 2016, Berlanti discussed his involvement, as producer and possibly as director, in a Booster Gold feature film that was in development. Zack Stentz was signed to the project as screenwriter. It is still in movie limbo.

==== Arrowverse ====
In January 2012, it was announced that, along with Andrew Kreisberg and Marc Guggenheim, Berlanti would create, write, and produce a series called Arrow, based on Green Arrow, for The CW. The series premiered on October 10, 2012, and was picked up to full series in the same month. On July 30, 2013, it was announced at the summer TCA tour that Berlanti, Kreisberg, and DC Comics CCO Geoff Johns would be introducing Barry Allen in the second season of Arrow, with the possibility of the character being spun off to his own series. Actor Grant Gustin was cast and made his debut in episode 8, "The Scientist." In November 2013, The CW officially ordered a pilot for The Flash, and in May 2014, the network picked the project up to series, with a premiere scheduled for autumn of that year.

On February 26, 2015, it was announced that Berlanti, along with Guggenheim and Kreisberg, would write and executive produce a spin-off series featuring The Atom (Brandon Routh), Captain Cold (Wentworth Miller), Martin Stein (Victor Garber), and The White Canary (Caity Lotz), for a potential 2016 premiere. The series was ultimately titled Legends of Tomorrow, and it followed a ragtag team of heroes and villains as they traveled through time and space on a mission to stop the devious immortal Vandal Savage. The series premiered on January 21, 2016, and was renewed for a second season on March 11, 2016.

==== Supergirl ====
On September 4, 2014, it was reported that Berlanti would executive-produce a re-imagining of the origin of Supergirl, to be written by The New Normal and Chuck alum Ali Adler. The Flash co-creator Johns was also involved with development. On September 19, 2014, it was reported that CBS had made a series commitment to Supergirl. It was also announced that Berlanti would co-write the first episode.

After its first season, the show moved from CBS to The CW, bringing all live-action Arrowverse shows together on one network. The show made history in 2018 for featuring the first live-action transgender superhero when Nicole Maines was cast in a main role.

==== Other DC shows ====
Berlanti worked with Mara Brock Akil and her husband Salim Akil to develop Black Lightning which also aired on The CW.

Berlanti also produced Titans, starring Brenton Thwaites, with Akiva Goldsman, Geoff Johns, and Sarah Schechter; Doom Patrol, starring Matt Bomer and Brendan Fraser, with Jeremy Carver, Geoff Johns, and Sarah Schechter; and Stargirl starring Brec Bassinger, with Greg Beeman, Melissa Carter, Geoff Johns, Sarah Schechter, and Glen Winter.

In 2017, Berlanti wrote and executive-produced Freedom Fighters: The Ray for The CW's streaming platform. The show was praised for its depiction of the first openly gay superhero to headline a series.

In 2019, it was announced that Berlanti would be producing shows based on Green Lantern and Strange Adventures for HBO Max. It was also revealed that Berlanti would also serve as a writer on the Green Lantern series. Both shows were scrapped in 2023.

He was an executive producer of the superhero drama television series Superman & Lois (2021–24).

== Personal life ==
Berlanti was born in Suffern, New York. His parents are Barbara Moller Berlanti and Eugene "Gene" Berlanti. He attended Rye High School in Rye, New York, graduating with the class of 1989. Greg has one sister, Dina and two nieces. He has Italian and Irish ancestry. He described his early life in an August 2004 interview with Entertainment Weekly: "We were Italians in a town of WASPs" and his family was not "doing as well as 90% of the community." The Berlanti Productions production logo, which follows each episode of shows he produces, features a family with their backs to the audience and the spoken quote, "Greg, move your head!" This is an homage to Berlanti's father, Gene, who would yell at Greg when he was blocking the television screen. Berlanti, a Delta Tau Delta alumnus, graduated from Northwestern University in Evanston, Illinois in 1994.

Berlanti has been in a relationship with ex–LA Galaxy soccer player Robbie Rogers since mid-2013. On December 31, 2016, Rogers and Berlanti announced they had become engaged. Their wedding occurred on December 2, 2017. They have two children born via surrogacy, a son in 2016 and a daughter in 2019.

Berlanti was among 1,200 film industry figures who signed an open letter in September 2025 decrying an Israeli film boycott, which described the Film Workers for Palestine boycott of the Israeli film industry as "discriminatory and antisemitic".

== Awards and honors ==
Berlanti received the Governors Award at the 76th Primetime Emmy Awards. The Governors Award is bestowed by the Television Academy's Board of Governors and honors an individual, company or organization that has made a profound, transformational and long-lasting contribution to the arts and/or of television.

In 2022, Berlanti received the high honor of the Norman Lear Achievement Award in Television at the 33rd Producers Guild of America Awards for his remarkable impact on the art and craft of television.

In 2019, Berlanti received the Television Showman of the Year Award at the 56th Annual ICG Publicists Awards, the Patron of the Artists Award at the SAG-AFTRA Foundation 45th Annual Patron of the Artists Awards, the Kieser Award at the 45th Annual Humanitas Prize Awards and the Outstanding Film – Wide Release Award for "Love, Simon" at the 30th Annual GLAAD Media Awards.

Additional honors include: Los Angeles LGBT Center's 49th Anniversary Gala Vanguard Awards Honoree; Friends of the Saban Community Clinic's 43rd Annual Gala Honoree; Variety Hall of Fame Inductee; Northwestern University School of Communication Graduation Convocation Address.

In 2018, Berlanti was selected for the Vanguard Award by the Los Angeles LGBT Center, The Founders Award by the International Emmy Awards, The Hero Award by the Trevor Project, 500 Most Powerful People Working in the Global Media Business Today by Variety, in addition to winning a Teen Choice Award for The Flash, Riverdale and Love, Simon.

Additional wins include; 2017 for Teen Choice Award for Choice Drama TV Show for Riverdale and 2016 People's Choice Award wins for Supergirl and The Flash.

In 2021, The Flight Attendant earned nine Emmy Awards nominations, including "Outstanding Comedy Series." The show also earned two Golden Globe Awards nominations, including "Best Television Series, Musical or Comedy."

Past honors include; a 2012 Directors Guild of America Award nomination for Outstanding Directorial Achievement in Movies for Television and Miniseries in recognition for Direction of Political Animals Pilot, a 2013 Emmy Award nomination for Outstanding Miniseries or Movie for Political Animals, a 2014 Saturn Award for Best Superhero Adaptation Television Series for The Flash as well as The Christopher Award for The Flash, a Leo Award Best Dramatic Series nomination for Arrow in 2013 as well as a Fan Favorite Awards and Fan Favorite New Show by TV Guide for Arrow, the Honors Writer Award by The Caucus in 2010, the Alumni Merit Award by the Northwestern Alumni Association in 2006, a 2005 a Gracie Award Presented by the Foundation of American Women in Radio and Television, the Religion Communicators Council Wilbur Award for the "A Man of Faith" episode of Jack & Bobby in 2005, the Turner Prize at the Environmental Media Awards in 2003 for Everwood, a GLAAD Media Award in 2001 for The Broken Hearts Club and a 2000 SHINE Award for his writing work on Dawson's Creek. Berlanti was also recognized by Variety in 2000 for their Watchable Helmers issue, as well as their 2018 Inclusion Impact Report and by The Hollywood Reporter in their 'Power 100 List' and 'Power Showrunners List' in 2018. In 2017, Berlanti was selected for the Brandon Tartikoff Legacy Award. In 2021, Berlanti was awarded The Actors Fund Encore Award for his support of entertainment industry professionals throughout the pandemic.

Year	Award	Category	Title	Result
2018	Black Reel TV Awards	Outstanding Drama Series	Black Lightning	Won
2013	Directors Guild of America Awards	Outstanding Directorial Achievement in Movies for Television and Limited Series	Political Animals (for "Pilot")	Nominated
2016	Dragon Awards	Best Science Fiction or Fantasy TV Series	The Flash	Nominated
2015	Hugo Award	Best Dramatic Presentation (Short Form)	The Flash (for "Pilot")	Nominated
2014	Leo Awards	Best Dramatic Series	Arrow	Nominated
2015	Leo Awards	Best Dramatic Series	The Flash	Nominated
2013	Primetime Emmy Awards	Outstanding Miniseries or Movie	Political Animals	Nominated
2021	Primetime Emmy Awards	Outstanding Comedy Series	The Flight Attendant	Nominated
2024	Primetime Emmy Awards	Outstanding Television Movie	Red, White & Royal Blue	Nominated
2024	Primetime Emmy Awards	Governors Award	—N/a	Honored
2021	Producers Guild of America Awards	Best Episodic Comedy	The Flight Attendant	Nominated
2022	Producers Guild of America Awards	Norman Lear Achievement Award in Television	—N/a	Won
2024	Producers Guild of America Awards	Best Streamed or Televised Movie	Red, White & Royal Blue	Nominated
2009	Writers Guild of America Awards	Best Episodic Drama	Eli Stone (for "Pilot")	Nominated
2013	Writers Guild of America Awards	Best Long Form – Original	Political Animals (for "Pilot")	Nominated

== Philanthropy ==
=== Northwestern Endowment ===
In 2020, Berlanti gifted $2 million through his organization, the Berlanti Family Foundation, to his alma mater, the Northwestern University School of Communication, to establish a new dramatic writing professorship. The new professorship was named the Barbara Berlanti Professorship in Writing for the Screen and Stage after Berlanti's late mother, who he described as a "lifelong champion of the arts."

The professorship helped to increase the teaching capacity and number of courses offered in the school's Department of Radio/Television/Film (RTVF). Berlanti also previously gave an endowment to Northwestern's playwriting program.

Berlanti's latest endowment to Northwestern marks the Berlanti Family Foundation's largest charitable contribution for a single organization to date. Berlanti said he "aims to help Northwestern continue its great legacy of fostering the next generation of humane, diverse, courageous and bold storytellers."

=== Fuck Cancer ===
Berlanti is a board member of Fuck Cancer, a health organization working for early detection and prevention of cancer. Launched in 2009, Fuck Cancer aims to engage millennials through social media to have a conversation about early detection and acute awareness of cancer.

=== Annual Barbara Berlanti Gala ===
In 2018, Berlanti and husband Robbie Rogers chaired Fuck Cancer's inaugural Barbara Berlanti Heroes Gala, named in honor of his late mother. Berlanti Productions was also a sponsor of the event.

Kristin Chenoweth headlined the event, while co-founder Yael Cohen Braun and board member Stephen Amell were the headline honorees at the event. Berlanti said that his mother Barbara was the most charitable person he ever knew and that there was no better way to honor her than a night of fun and giving back to this incredible organization.

== Filmography ==
=== Film ===
Director

- The Broken Hearts Club (2000)
- Life as We Know It (2010)
- Love, Simon (2018)
- Fly Me to the Moon (2024)

Writer

- The Broken Hearts Club (2000)
- Green Lantern (2011)
- Wrath of the Titans (2012) (Story only)

Producer

- Green Lantern: Emerald Knights (2011)
- Green Lantern (2011)
- Haunted (2013)
- Pan (2015)
- Deathstroke: Knights & Dragons: The Movie (2020) (Executive producer)
- Unpregnant (2020)
- Free Guy (2021)
- Moonshot (2022)
- My Policeman (2022)
- Rock Hudson: All That Heaven Allowed (2023)
- Red, White & Royal Blue (2023)
- Atlas (2024)
- Red, White & Royal Wedding (2027)

=== Television ===
Year	Title	Network	Creator	Writer	Executive Producer	Notes
1998–2003	Dawson's Creek	The WB	No	Yes	Yes	
2000	Young Americans	The WB	No	Yes	No	
2002–2006	Everwood	The WB	Yes	Yes	Yes	
2004–2005	Jack & Bobby	The WB	Yes	Yes	Yes	
2006–2008	Brothers & Sisters	ABC	No	Yes	Yes	
2008–2009	Eli Stone	ABC	Yes	Yes	Yes	
2010–2011	No Ordinary Family	ABC	Yes	Yes	Yes	
2012	Political Animals	USA Network	Yes	Yes	Yes	Also directed episode "Pilot"
2012–2020	Arrow	The CW	Developer	Yes	Yes	
2013–2014	The Tomorrow People	The CW	Developer	Yes	Yes	
2014–2023	The Flash	The CW	Developer	Yes	Yes	
2015	87th Academy Awards	ABC	Yes	No	No	TV special
2015–2021	Supergirl	CBS / The CW	Developer	Yes	Yes	
2016–2022	Legends of Tomorrow	The CW	Developer	Yes	Yes	
2018–2025	You	Lifetime/Netflix	Developer	Yes	Yes	
2018–2023	Titans	DC Universe / Max	Developer	Yes	Yes	
2020	Robot Chicken	Cartoon Network / Adult Swim	No	No	No	As himself, episode "Endgame"
2021–2024	Superman & Lois	The CW	Developer	Yes	Yes	

=== Executive producer only ===
Year	Title	Network
2007–2009	Dirty Sexy Money	ABC
2013	Golden Boy	CBS
2014–2016	The Mysteries of Laura	NBC
2015–2016	Vixen	CW Seed
2015–2020	Blindspot	NBC
2017–2023	Riverdale	The CW
2017–2018	Freedom Fighters: The Ray	CW Seed
2018	Deception	ABC
2018–2021	Black Lightning	The CW
2018–2019	Constantine: City of Demons	CW Seed
2018–2020	God Friended Me	CBS
2018–2026	All American	The CW
2018–2020	Chilling Adventures of Sabrina	Netflix
2019	The Red Line	CBS
2019–2023	Doom Patrol	DC Universe / Max
2019–2021	Prodigal Son	Fox
2019–2022	Batwoman	The CW
2020	Katy Keene	The CW
2020	Deathstroke: Knights & Dragons	CW Seed
2020	Helter Skelter: An American Myth	Epix
2020	Equal	Max
2020–2022	Stargirl	DC Universe / The CW
2020–2022	The Flight Attendant	Max
2021–2023	Kung Fu	The CW
2022–2024	All American: Homecoming	The CW
2023	Gotham Knights	The CW
2023–2025	Found	NBC
2024	The Girls on the Bus	Max
2024	Dead Boy Detectives	Netflix
2024–2026	Brilliant Minds	NBC
2027	Scooby-Doo: Origins	Netflix
