= Disgraceland (Elvis Hitler album) =

Studio album by Elvis Hitler
- Released: 1988
- Studio: Garageland
- Genre: Rockabilly, psychobilly
- Label: Restless

Elvis Hitler chronology
| Disgraceland (1988) | Hellbilly (1989) |

Disgraceland is the debut album by the American band Elvis Hitler, released in 1988. It was first issued in 1987 in a limited run by Wang Head Records. The album was a success on college radio stations. The band supported it with a North American tour that included shows with Evan Johns. Disgraceland sold around 13,000 copies in its first two years of release. "Green Haze (Pt. I & II)" is mentioned in Thomas Pynchon's 2013 novel, Bleeding Edge.

== Production ==
The album was recorded at Garageland Studios, in New Boston, Michigan. Elvis Hitler considered their sound to be "metalbilly". They were inspired primarily by long hours of television viewing, particularly showings of old horror movies. The title track and "Elvis' Ripoff Theme" are instrumentals. "Green Haze (Pt. I & II)" is a version of the Green Acres theme set to the music of Jimi Hendrix's "Purple Haze". "Ten Wheels for Jesus" is a cover of the Beasts of Bourbon song.

== Critical reception ==
Professional ratings
Review scores
| Source | Rating |
|---|---|
| Chicago Tribune | 2.5/4 stars |
| Daily Echo | 4/5 stars |

The Washington Post noted that "a few acid-rock licks slip in elsewhere, but Elvis H.'s principal battle plan is to push rockabilly to record rpm's". The Chicago Tribune called Elvis Hitler "a mix of thrash and rockabilly that'll work any party into a frenzy" and "more than just a one-joke band". The Richmond Times-Dispatch stated, "Elvis Hitler blends hardcore guitars, frenzied drumming and eruptions of witty vocals with bluegrass and rockabilly... It sounds like Buck Owens on designer drugs."

The Morning Call opined that "rarely has shock value been so cheap and boring." The Daily Echo deemed the album "13 superb cuts ... [that] may lack taste but that's about all." The Telegraph & Argus called it "fifties rhythms dressed up with cracking guitars and adolescent Truffaut quotes". The Detroit Free Press labeled Elvis Hitler "the Ramones of rockabilly". Maximum Rocknroll considered it "a great album in a garage rockabilly style". The Trouser Press Record Guide praised the "familiar-sounding originals that inbreed the Cramps, Mojo Nixon and the Stray Cats."

== Track listing ==
| No. | Title | Length |
|---|---|---|
| 1. | "Cool Daddy in a Cadillac" |
| 2. | "Live Fast, Die Young" |
| 3. | "Hot Rod to Hell" |
| 4. | "Rocking Over Russia" |
| 5. | "Berlin to Memphis" |
| 6. | "Elvis' Ripoff Theme" |
| 7. | "Battle Cry of 1,000 Men" |
| 8. | "Green Haze (Pt. I & II)" |
| 9. | "I Love Your Guts" |
| 10. | "Ten Wheels for Jesus" |
| 11. | "Black Babies Dancing on Fire" |
| 12. | "Crush Your Skull" |
| 13. | "Disgraceland" |
