= Graceland (disambiguation) =

Graceland is the former estate of Elvis Presley.

Graceland may also refer to:

== Places ==
- Graceland (Elkins, West Virginia), a historic house
- Graceland Cemetery (Washington, D.C.)
- Graceland Cemetery in Chicago, Illinois

== Arts, entertainment, and media ==
- Graceland (album), 1986 by Paul Simon
  - "Graceland" (song), the title track
- Graceland (Kierra Sheard album), 2014
- Graceland (2012 film), a Filipino drama
- Graceland (2006 film), a short film directed by Anocha Suwichakornpong
- Graceland (TV series), a 2013 American drama
- GraceLand, a 2004 novel by Chris Abani
- Graceland (Roberts novel), 2019, by Bethan Roberts
- "Graceland", a song by The Bible

== Other uses ==
- Graceland University, a private liberal arts university in Lamoni, Iowa, and Independence, Missouri
