= Graceland (Roberts novel) =

Graceland is the fifth novel by British writer Bethan Roberts. The novel fictionalizes the childhood years of Elvis Presley with a particular focus on his relationship with his mother Gladys Presley. Roberts wrote the book in part because of the presence of Elvis in her life, through her mom's being a "massive Elvis fan".

Generally reception of the novel was positive. Telegraph review Clair Allfree gave the novel five stars. In the Financial Times review of the novel, critic Susie Boyt called it "disciplined and surprisingly sober considering its themes", describing the full novel as an "understated, thoughtful novel".
