= Bethan Roberts (author) =

British author

Bethan Roberts (born 1973 in Abingdon-on-Thames) is a British novelist.

== Selected works ==
- The Pools (2007)
- The Good Plain Cook (2008)
- My Policeman (2012)
- Mother Island (2014)
- Graceland (2019)
