= My Policeman =

2012 novel by Bethan Roberts

- Authors: Bethan Roberts
- Language: English and Spanish
- Publisher: Chatto & Windus
- Publication date: 4 August 2012
- Pages: 304

My Policeman is a 2012 historical romance novel written by Bethan Roberts. It is set in Brighton, East Sussex, United Kingdom, in the 1950s.

== Plot summary ==
The novel is set in Brighton in 1957. Marion, a schoolteacher, falls in love with Tom Burgess, a policeman. Tom explores love with Patrick Hazelwood, a museum curator but, because of the social constraints of the era, Tom and Marion get married, even though Tom still has feelings for Patrick. Tom is torn between the safety his marriage to Marion offers him and his attraction to Patrick. When Marion becomes jealous, she exposes Patrick and gets him arrested for indecency. This causes a permanent split in Tom and Patrick's relationship and tension in Tom and Marion's marriage.

== Critical reception ==
The novel received positive reviews in the press. Writing for The Guardian, Natasha Tripney said the style was "fluid and tender". In The Independent, Richard Canning wrote a positive review, suggesting the novel had "a strong period feel and a sprightly structure." Moreover, he added that the "euphemistic references to homosexuality and rich period slang" were congruous.

== Film adaptation ==
In February 2021, it was reported that a film adaptation of the novel was in the works, directed by Michael Grandage and starring Emma Corrin as Marion, David Dawson as Patrick Hazelwood, and Harry Styles as Tom Burgess with shooting to begin in April of that year. It was later reported the film would also feature Gina McKee as an older Marion, Rupert Everett as an older Patrick Hazelwood, and Linus Roache as an older Tom Burgess with the film starting with the arrival of Patrick to Marion and Tom's home during the late 1990s, triggering an exploration of the events from 40 years ago in the 1950s.

My Policeman had its world premiere at the 2022 Toronto International Film Festival and was screened at the Adelaide Film Festival before a limited theatrical release in the United States and a streaming release on 4 November 2022 by Amazon Prime Video. The film received mixed reviews from critics, who praised Dawson's performance but criticised the direction and the screenplay. The main cast members were announced as the collective winners of an acting award at TIFF's Tribute Awards, the first time that an award in that category was ever presented to an ensemble cast rather than an individual.
