= Red, White & Royal Wedding =

Upcoming film directed by Jamie Babbit

- Directed by: Jamie Babbit
- Screenplay by: Gemma Burgess; Matthew López; Casey McQuiston
- Based on: Red, White & Royal Blue by Casey McQuiston
- Produced by: Greg Berlanti; Sarah Schechter; Michael McGrath; Matthew López; Jennifer Salke
- Starring: Taylor Zakhar Perez; Nicholas Galitzine; Clifton Collins Jr.; Sarah Shahi; Rachel Hilson; Henry Ashton; Alex Høgh Andersen; Stephen Fry; Uma Thurman
- Production companies: Amazon MGM Studios; Berlanti-Schechter Films; Sullivan Street Productions
- Distributed by: Amazon MGM Studios
- Country: United States
- Language: English

Red, White & Royal Wedding is an upcoming American romantic comedy film directed by Jamie Babbit. A sequel to Red, White & Royal Blue (2023), which was based on the 2019 novel by Casey McQuiston, it is being produced by Amazon MGM Studios. Taylor Zakhar Perez and Nicholas Galitzine reprise their roles as Alex Claremont-Diaz and Prince Henry respectively.

A sequel was confirmed to be in development in May 2024, and a title was released in October 2025. The movie continues the romance between Alex Claremont-Diaz and Prince Henry established in the 2023 film. Principal photography began in January 2026, and additional casting reprisals and additions were also announced that month, including Uma Thurman, Sarah Shahi, Rachel Hilson, Clifton Collins Jr., and Stephen Fry reprising their roles, while new additions were Henry Ashton, Alex Høgh Andersen, Lena Headey and Chloe Fineman.

== Cast ==
- Taylor Zakhar Perez as Alex Claremont-Diaz
- Nicholas Galitzine as Prince Henry Fox
- Uma Thurman as President Ellen Claremont, Alex's mother
- Sarah Shahi as Zahra Bankston
- Rachel Hilson as Nora Holleran
- Henry Ashton
- Alex Høgh Andersen
- Lena Headey as Princess Catherine
- Chloe Fineman
- Ellie Bamber as Princess Beatrice
- Clifton Collins Jr. as Congressman Oscar Diaz
- Stephen Fry as James III
- Thomas Flynn as Prince Philip
- Aneesh Sheth as Amy
- Malcolm Atobrah as Percy Okonjo
- Mark Anthony Williams as Vice President Mike Holleran

== Background ==
The film is a sequel to Red, White & Royal Blue (2023), which itself was based on the 2019 novel Red, White & Royal Blue by Casey McQuiston. The 2023 film was an enemies to lovers romance between the fictional third in line to the throne of the United Kingdom, Prince Henry (Galitzine), and the son of the fictional President of the United States Ellen Claremont (Uma Thurman), Alex Claremont-Diaz (Zakhar Perez), as they navigate their private lives with their public ones as figureheads for their respective countries.

In May 2024, it was confirmed that a sequel to the film was in development. López revealed the news at a Q&A after a promotional screening of the first film, followed by a teaser image with the caption "fancy another slice?". Unlike the first film, Red, White & Royal Wedding is not based on a book, as the original novel was a standalone work. In October 2025, the project was officially greenlit and the title was released. Julie Rapaport, the head of movies at Amazon MGM Studios, added "we can't wait to bring fans an unforgettable new chapter in their love story."

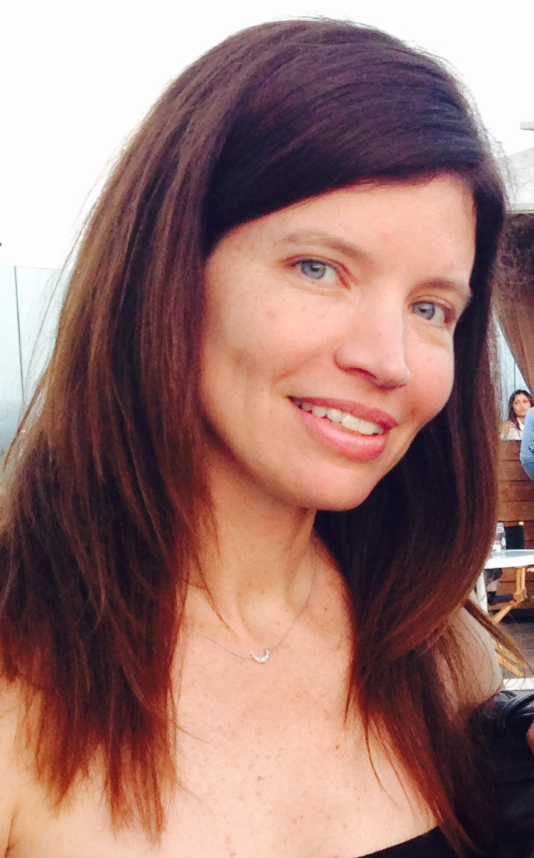
Director Jamie Babbit (pictured) takes on the job from Matthew López, who directed the 2023 film

The title, Red, White & Royal Wedding, triggered speculation that the film would be about the wedding between Prince Henry and Alex, drawn from a chapter exclusive to the Red, White & Royal Blue novel collector's edition which was about the couple planning a wedding. In a short clip released in January 2026, Galitzine and Zakhar Perez denied this and claimed the wedding was of Princess Beatrice, Prince Henry's younger sister.

== Production ==
=== Development ===
Taylor Zakhar Perez and Nicholas Galitzine reprise their roles as Alex Claremont-Diaz and Prince Henry respectively. Greg Berlanti and Sarah Schechter return to produce the film, and are joined with Michael McGrath, Matthew López, and Jennifer Salke, while Michael Constable and Casey McQuiston will serve as executive producers. Gemma Burgess, López, and McQuiston wrote the screenplay. Jamie Babbit will direct the movie. She previously directed But I'm a Cheerleader (1999), and expressed excitement about returning to a "queer love universe". In January, it was announced that Uma Thurman, Rachel Hilson, Stephen Fry, Sarah Shahi, Ellie Bamber, Clifton Collins Jr., Thomas Flynn, Aneesh Sheth, and Malcolm Atobrah were reprising their roles while Henry Ashton, Alex Høgh Andersen, Lena Headey, and Chloe Fineman were new additions to the cast.

=== Filming ===
Principal photography began in the United Kingdom in January 2026. Filming wrapped in March 2026 with post-production completed in October 2026.

== Reception ==
=== Accolades ===
Accolades received by Red, White & Royal Wedding
Award	Date of ceremony	Category	Recipient(s)	Result	Ref(s).
Queerties Awards	March 10, 2026	Next Big Thing	Red, White & Royal Wedding	Won	
