= Royal blue =

Color, deep and vivid shade of blue

Royal blue (traditional)

Color coordinates
- Hex triplet: #012169
- sRGB^{B} (r, g, b): (1, 33, 105)
- HSV (h, s, v): (222°, 99%, 41%)
- CIELCh_{uv} (L, C, h): (16, 46, 261°)
- Source: College of Arms
- B: Normalized to [0–255] (byte)

Royal blue (web color)

Color coordinates
- Hex triplet: #4169E1
- sRGB^{B} (r, g, b): (65, 105, 225)
- HSV (h, s, v): (225°, 71%, 88%)
- CIELCh_{uv} (L, C, h): (48, 103, 260°)
- Source: X11
- ISCC–NBS descriptor: Vivid blue
- B: Normalized to [0–255] (byte)

Royal blue (Pantone)

Color coordinates
- Hex triplet: #3D428B
- sRGB^{B} (r, g, b): (61, 66, 139)
- HSV (h, s, v): (236°, 56%, 55%)
- CIELCh_{uv} (L, C, h): (31, 58, 264°)
- Source: Pantone
- ISCC–NBS descriptor: Deep purplish blue
- B: Normalized to [0–255] (byte)

Royal blue is a deep and vivid shade of blue. Traditionally, royal blue is a deep shade of blue and is used in several national flags. However, the web color named royal blue is a much brighter shade.

== History ==
In early modern Europe, blue dye for textiles was made from woad. As it was expensive to produce and was not steadfast, it was used by the wealthy and became associated with nobility, particularly the kings of France.

Ever since 508 AD and the baptism of Clovis I, has been associated with the kings of France and France as a nation. It was the main colour of the uniform of the French Royal Guards regiment, which were created in 1563. Very soon, starting in the 17th century, it became the colour of all the uniforms of the French Army, from the Musketeers, during the Napoleonic era, and all the way to the First World War, until it was made obsolete as a colour for battle uniforms by modern warfare and the need for camouflage.

== Brightness ==
The Oxford English Dictionary defines "royal blue" as "a deep vivid blue", while the Cambridge English Dictionary defined it as "a strong, bright blue colour", and the Collins English Dictionary defines it as "a deep blue colour". US dictionaries give it as further towards purple, e.g. "a deep, vivid reddish or purplish blue" (Webster's New World College Dictionary) or "a vivid purplish blue" (Merriam-Webster).

The British College of Arms published a definition of the traditional shade of royal blue for use in the Union Jack and identified the Pantone code 280 C, whilst Pantone's own definition called 'royal blue' is coded 19-3955 TCX. British Standard BS 381C, which specifies colours for use in identification, coding and other special purposes, assigned the code BS381C-106 for royal blue, and the defunct British Colour Council assigned the code BCC 197.

A brighter color was chosen as the web color "royal blue" (the web colors when they were formulated in 1987 were originally known as the X11 colors). The World Wide Web Consortium designated the keyword "royalblue" to be this much brighter color, rather than the traditional darker version of royal blue.

Cree Inc. uses the term Royal Blue to describe light emitting diodes in the wavelength range 450–465 nanometers, slightly shorter than the regular blue range of 465–485 nanometers.

== Variations ==
=== Queen blue ===
Queen blue

Color coordinates
- Hex triplet: #436B95
- sRGB^{B} (r, g, b): (67, 107, 149)
- HSV (h, s, v): (211°, 55%, 58%)
- CIELCh_{uv} (L, C, h): (44, 43, 245°)
- Source: ISCC-NBS
- ISCC–NBS descriptor: Moderate blue
- B: Normalized to [0–255] (byte)

Queen blue is a medium tone of royal blue.

The first recorded use of queen blue as a color name in English was in 1926. Before that, since 1661, this color had been called queen's blue.

=== Imperial blue ===
Imperial blue

Color coordinates
- Hex triplet: #005A92
- sRGB^{B} (r, g, b): (0, 90, 146)
- HSV (h, s, v): (203°, 100%, 57%)
- CIELCh_{uv} (L, C, h): (37, 57, 247°)
- Source: Pantone
- ISCC–NBS descriptor: Moderate blue
- B: Normalized to [0–255] (byte)

Imperial blue is recorded as an alternative name for the traditional royal blue color above. The name is also used for a distinct, medium blue color by Pantone.

== In culture ==
Literature

- The color appears as the title of the book Red, White & Royal Blue by Casey McQuiston in reference to the British prince.

Auto racing

- In auto racing, royal blue (called 'imperial blue') is the traditional color of Ford and Carroll Shelby, and for 2012, the primary livery for Hendrick Motorsports' #48 sponsored by Lowe's.

Flags

- Royal blue is an official colour used in several national flags, including the Union Jack and in flags based on the Blue Ensign, such as the Flag of New Zealand.
- The Flag of the Philippines uses a royal blue field, which is normally displayed over the red field, to signify a state of peace. Reversing this arrangement (i.e. red above blue) transforms the flag into the nation's war ensign.

Australian rules football

- Royal blue is the primary colour of the guernseys for the North Melbourne Football Club.

Football

- Royal blue is the official colour of the shirts of Birmingham City F.C., whose nickname in consequence is Blues.
- Royal blue is the colour of the shirts of FC Schalke 04 and also one of their nicknames.
- Royal blue is the colour of the shirts of Everton F.C. and The Blues is one of their nicknames.
- Royal blue is the colour of the shirts of Glasgow Rangers F.C.
- Royal blue is the traditional colour of GNK Dinamo Zagreb and is also one of their nicknames (Modri, Plavi in the Croatian language).

American football

- Royal blue is the primary color of the uniforms for the Buffalo Bills and Los Angeles Rams of the NFL.

Baseball

Royal blue is the primary color of the Kansas City Royals of Major League Baseball, hence their name.

Basketball

Royal blue was the primary color of the Sacramento Kings franchise of the National Basketball Association when they played in Rochester and Cincinnati with the name Royals, again hence their name.

Ice hockey

- Royal blue is the primary color of the uniforms for many NHL teams, including the Buffalo Sabres, Edmonton Oilers, New York Islanders, New York Rangers, St. Louis Blues, and Vancouver Canucks.

Uniforms

- When, in 2008, the United States Transportation Security Administration changed the color of airport screener uniforms from white to royal blue, they found that it made the work of the airport screeners easier because airline passengers became more compliant, apparently because by wearing blue, the airport screeners came to be perceived more as authority figures.

University

- Imperial blue is the brand colour of the Imperial College London, which is used through all college communications.
- Royal blue is the brand colour of Yonsei University, used in its emblem, flag, and various university designs.

== See also ==
- Midnight blue
- Cobalt blue
- Navy blue
- Shades of blue
