= One Last Stop =

2021 novel by Casey McQuiston

- Cover, first edition (2021)
- Author: Casey McQuiston
- Illustrator: Monique Aimee
- Language: English
- Genre: LGBT; Romance
- Publisher: St. Martin's Griffin
- Publication date: June 1, 2021
- Publication place: United States
- Media type: Print (hardback, paperback)
- Pages: 432
- ISBN: 978-1-2502-4449-9

One Last Stop is a 2021 LGBTQ romance novel written by American author Casey McQuiston. The novel is about a woman named August Landry, a cynical pseudo detective, who finds love in a woman named Jane Su she meets on a subway, a punk butch lesbian from the 1970s who has been misplaced in time and is trapped on the subway.

== Background ==
One Last Stop is Casey McQuiston's second published novel. In terms of the time travel aspect of the book, McQuiston was inspired by the television series Outlander. In an interview for Insider they said they were inspired to set the story on a subway because they see "public transit as a liminal space where your life crosses paths with another person's life like five million times for half a second." McQuiston also drew from their own experiences with New York City's queer bars and various works of fiction and non-fiction about them, including romance novel Felix Ever After, the poetry of Frank O'Hara, Chantal Regnault's photograph books, and the travel diary Moby Dyke.

The novel's cover art was designed by Kerri Resnick and illustrated by Monique Aimee.

== Plot ==
August Landry is a bisexual 23-year-old woman who moves to New York City in order to forget her old life. She is very cynical and is determined to leave everyone from her old life behind. August is a closed-off individual who does not believe in love or friendship. She is also looking to move on from her mother's obsessive search for her missing uncle which has consumed all of August's life. In New York City, she finds queer roommates and gets a job at a restaurant called Pancake Billy's House of Pancakes. On her way to take college classes, she bumps into a woman, Jane, on the subway and develops a crush. As the two get to know each other, Jane reveals that she only knows her name because it was written on the inside of her jacket and that she is actually from the 1970s. August must unearth her detective skills and find a way to get Jane back to her time as well as save Pancake Billy's House of Pancakes from gentrification, all while learning to be open to people.

== Characters ==
=== Main characters ===
- August Landry is a 23-year-old bisexual college student living in New York City. Her love interest is Jane Su.
- Biyu "Jane" Su is a punk butch lesbian transported from the 1970s and stuck in a subway car. Her love interest is August Landry.
- Niko Rivera is one of August's roommates. He is a transgender man, part-time psychic medium, and part-time bartender. His love interest is Myla.
- Myla is one of August's roommates. She is an artist who makes art out of bones. Her love interest is Niko.
- Wes is one of August's roommates. He is a tattoo artist. His love interest is Isaiah.

=== Minor characters ===
- Suzette Landry is August Landry's mother and sister to Augie Landry.
- Augie Landry is an uncle to August Landry and a long-lost older brother to Suzette Landry.
- Isaiah is August's neighbor. He is a drag queen who goes by the name Annie Depressant. His love interest is Wes.
- Lucie works at Pancake Billy's House of Pancakes. Her love interest is Winfield.
- Winfield works at Pancake Billy's House of Pancakes, and part-time as a drag queen. His love interest is Lucie.
- Jerry works as a fry cook at Pancake Billy's House of Pancakes.

== Reception ==
Following in the footsteps of their first book, Red, White & Royal Blue, One Last Stop has received positive reviews. NPR writes that "One Last Stop is an electrifying romance that synapses into the dreamy 'Hot Person Summer' kind of story you wish you were a part of." Kirkus Reviews speaks to the aspects of the book that highlight the Queer community, writing "every scene that takes place with August’s chosen family of friends crackles with electricity, warmth, and snappy pop-culture references, whether they’re at a charmingly eccentric 24-hour pancake diner or a drag queen brunch."

In a review for BookTrib, Madison Hill described One Last Stop as "what the modern rom-com should be," praising its diverse representation and emotional authenticity. Hill highlighted McQuiston's innovative take on traditional romance tropes, presenting love "across the spectrum of sexuality and gender" while maintaining the humor and heart of the genre. She also commended the novel's engaging characters and narrative style, noting it as a compelling story readers would find difficult to put down.

One Last Stop was nominated for the Goodreads Choice Awards for best romance novel of 2021 where it placed 3rd. The book has also been on The New York Times best seller list for the week of June 20, 2021, been included as one of Time's 100 Must-Read Books of 2021, and placed sixth in the BookPage's Best Romance of 2021.
