= Red, White & Royal Blue (film) =

2023 film by Matthew López

- Release poster
- Directed by: Matthew López
- Screenplay by: Matthew López; Ted Malawer
- Based on: Red, White & Royal Blue by Casey McQuiston
- Produced by: Greg Berlanti; Sarah Schechter
- Starring: Taylor Zakhar Perez; Nicholas Galitzine; Clifton Collins Jr.; Sarah Shahi; Rachel Hilson; Stephen Fry; Uma Thurman
- Cinematography: Stephen Goldblatt
- Edited by: Kristina Hetherington; Nick Moore
- Music by: Drum & Lace
- Production companies: Amazon Studios; Berlanti-Schechter Films
- Distributed by: Amazon Prime Video
- Release dates: July 22, 2023 (BFI IMAX); August 11, 2023 (United States)
- Running time: 118 minutes
- Country: United States
- Language: English

Red, White & Royal Blue is a 2023 American romantic comedy film directed by Matthew López in his feature film directorial debut, from a screenplay that he co-wrote with Ted Malawer. The script is based on the 2019 novel by Casey McQuiston; it depicts a developing love affair between the son of the president of the United States (Taylor Zakhar Perez) and a British prince (Nicholas Galitzine). Clifton Collins Jr., Sarah Shahi, Rachel Hilson, Stephen Fry, and Uma Thurman appear in supporting roles.

In 2019, Amazon Studios announced the film's development with Greg Berlanti as a producer. López was announced as director and co-writer with Malawer in 2021. Casting announcements began in June 2022 with Zakhar Perez, Galitzine and Thurman announced to play their respective roles. The majority of the remaining cast was announced the following month. Filming took place in England between June and August 2022.

Red, White & Royal Blue premiered at the BFI IMAX in London on July 22, 2023, and was released on Amazon Prime Video on August 11. It received positive reviews from critics, and was nominated for Outstanding Television Movie at the 76th Primetime Emmy Awards. It is the last film released under the Amazon Studios name before the studio was rebranded as Amazon MGM Studios a month later. A sequel, Red, White & Royal Wedding, is in development with Zakhar Perez and Galitzine set to return.

== Plot ==
Alex Claremont-Diaz, the first son of the United States, attends the wedding of Prince Phillip, Duke of Cambridge. Alex has a long-standing feud with Prince Henry, Prince Phillip's younger brother. During the reception, Alex and Henry get into an argument that results in the £75,000 wedding cake falling on top of them.

To mitigate the fallout after the cake incident and help his mother's re-election campaign, Alex is forced into a series of interviews and appearances with Henry, in which they pose as friends. While stuck in a custodial closet, Alex admits that he began to resent Henry after he rebuffed him at Alex's first appearance as a public figure. Henry apologizes, explaining that he had just lost his father, and was forced by the Palace to appear at events while mourning. The two make amends, later beginning to text regularly and become real friends.

At Alex's annual New Year's party, a drunk Henry leaves abruptly after seeing Alex kiss several girls at midnight. Alex follows him outdoors to the White House grounds. Henry expresses frustration with how he will never be able to be the real him, and he kisses Alex. After the party, Henry neglects to respond to Alex's attempts to contact him for several weeks. During Henry's silence, Alex confides in Nora, his best friend and the Vice President's granddaughter, and he realizes that he is attracted to Henry.

Alex texts Henry to ask if he will be attending the Prime Minister's dinner, which Henry does not respond to. Henry does attend the dinner, and they are forced to interact publicly to keep appearances. Alex requests his Secret Service bodyguard arrange for him and Henry to talk somewhere private, where Henry begins to express remorse for the kiss on New Year's, but Alex kisses him again. They are interrupted by Alex's Secret Service.

The pair quickly become lovers, although they keep it a secret from everyone except those who are directly necessary, such as bodyguards. They also tell close friends, using private jets to traipse back and forth across the Atlantic throughout their relationship.

Alex comes up with a plan for his mother to win Texas, their home state, in the upcoming election. After much badgering for his mother to read his plan, he travels to Texas to lead the campaign effort. When he goes to Brooklyn to speak at the Democratic National Convention, Henry surprises him with a visit, where they are later caught and Henry is forced to return home. Alex later comes out to his mother, who is supportive, but advises him to consider his relationship with Henry carefully.

Alex invites Henry to his family's vacation home near Austin, Texas, where Alex begins to tell Henry that he is in love with him, but Henry, fearing that he cannot sustain a love-relationship - since the British royal family will not accept it - preemptively leaves the conversation and flees back to England. He neglects to respond to Alex's attempts at contact, so Alex travels to London unexpectedly and demands an explanation for his behavior. Henry explains that his position in the royal family makes loving Alex difficult, and requests patience. Alex convinces Henry that their relationship is worth fighting for, and he can be patient as required.

Shortly after Alex returns to the U.S., Alex and Henry's personal e‑mails to each other are hacked and posted online, followed by wide coverage in the press. In response, Alex makes a touching speech admitting that he is in a romantic relationship with Henry. The King orders all Alex's and Henry's means of contact cut off. Zahra Bankston, the White House Deputy Chief of Staff, gets in touch with Shaan, Henry's equerry, and Alex and Henry are finally able to talk. Alex immediately flies to London to reunite with Henry. King James III summons them to a meeting and tells them that they cannot be together, since their relationship is incompatible with royal tradition and the expectations of the public. However, Henry's supportive sister Beatrice notices a crowd gathered in front of Buckingham Palace in support of them, and she cites news reports of similar crowds all over the U.K. Alex and Henry kiss in front of the window, then step outside together onto the balcony and openly greet the cheering public as a couple.

On election night, Henry returns to the United States to be with Alex, whose plan to win Texas for his mother ultimately results in her barely winning re-election. Later that evening, Alex and Henry are seen biking down the street toward Alex's "working class" childhood home in Austin, where they leave the bikes on the lawn and go inside to personally celebrate.

== Cast ==
- Taylor Zakhar Perez as Alex Claremont-Diaz, the first son of the United States
- Nicholas Galitzine as Prince Henry, third in line to the British throne
- Clifton Collins Jr. as Congressman Oscar Diaz, Alex's father
- Sarah Shahi as Zahra Bankston, the deputy chief of staff for Ellen Claremont
- Rachel Hilson as Nora Holleran, Alex's best friend and the granddaughter of the vice president of the United States
- Stephen Fry as James III, King of the United Kingdom and Prince Henry's grandfather
- Uma Thurman as Ellen Claremont, the first female president of the United States and Alex's mother
- Ellie Bamber as Princess Beatrice, Prince Henry's younger sister
- Thomas Flynn as Prince Phillip, Prince Henry's elder brother
- Malcolm Atobrah as Percy Okonjo, Prince Henry's best friend
- Akshay Khanna as Shaan Shrivastava, Prince Henry's equerry
- Sharon D. Clarke as the prime minister of the United Kingdom
- Aneesh Sheth as Amy, a United States Secret Service agent
- Juan Castano as Miguel Ramos, a political journalist and Alex's past fling
- Charles Nishikawa as the prime minister of Japan

Additionally, Donald Sage MacKay plays Jeffrey Richards, a Republican nominee facing Ellen Claremont in the presidential election, while Rachel Maddow and Joy Reid appear as themselves. Casey McQuiston, the author of the original novel, has a cameo in the film as Ellen Claremont's speechwriter.

== Production ==
=== Development ===
In April 2019, it was reported that Amazon Studios had won an auction to the film rights of Red, White & Royal Blue, which would be produced by Berlanti Productions through its subsidiary Berlanti-Schechter Films. In October 2021, it was reported that Matthew López was hired to direct and re-wrote a draft of the script by Ted Malawer.

=== Casting ===
On June 1, 2022, Taylor Zakhar Perez and Nicholas Galitzine were announced as the film's leads, playing Alex Claremont-Diaz and Prince Henry respectively. Shortly after, Uma Thurman was confirmed to play Ellen Claremont. Clifton Collins Jr., Stephen Fry, Sarah Shahi, Rachel Hilson, Ellie Bamber, Aneesh Sheth, Polo Morín, Ahmed Elhaj, and Akshay Khanna were also announced to be joining the cast. Production began in the UK that same month. In July 2022, Sharon D. Clarke, Malcolm Atobrah, and Thomas Flynn were cast.

=== Filming ===
Principal photography began in the United Kingdom in June 2022 and wrapped that August.

The Sculpture Gallery of the Victoria and Albert Museum was featured in the dance scene. The scene prominently features the Torso of Banović Strahinja sculpture by Ivan Meštrović.

== Music ==
Drum & Lace composed the film's score. The soundtrack album was released on August 11, 2023, by Lakeshore Records.

The album features songs by artists Vagabon and Oliver Sim. "If I Loved You" by Vagabon was released as a promotional single on July 26, 2023. It is a cover of the song of the same name from the musical Carousel. It was followed by "Fruit (Red, White & Royal Blue Version)" by Sim on August 3, 2023. It is an orchestral version of his song of the same name from his 2022 album Hideous Bastard.

== Release ==
Red, White & Royal Blue had its world premiere at the BFI IMAX in London on July 22, 2023, although its actors were absent due to the 2023 SAG-AFTRA strike. Matthew López was the only member of the production present but did not walk the red carpet, or give interviews as he was also on strike as a member of the Writers Guild of America.

The film was released on Amazon Prime Video on August 11, 2023. For the first three weeks after its release, it was the top watched film worldwide on the platform and provoked what Prime Video described as "a huge surge" of new subscribers. Amazon Prime Video did not release the film in Turkey due to its LGBT scenes.

== Reception ==
=== Critical response ===
The film received generally positive reviews upon release. On the review aggregator website Rotten Tomatoes, 75% of 122 critics' reviews are positive, with an average rating of 6.4/10. The website's consensus reads: "Amusing and endearing, Red, White & Royal Blue is a cheerfully formulaic rom-com that embraces inclusion without falling back on stereotypes." Metacritic, which uses a weighted average, assigned the film a score of 62 out of 100, based on 25 critics, indicating "generally favorable" reviews.

CNN Entertainment's Brian Lowry stated that the film "is at its core a fairy-tale romance – only where the challenge isn't the customary wicked stepmother or malevolent witch, but rather what happens when true love finds two princes, not one." Amy Nicholson of The New York Times wrote: "It sounds like fan fiction and looks like it, too, particularly when Galitzine dips his chin bashfully – a tic that Princess Diana passed on to her boys. Yet, as in any screwball romance worth its trans-Atlantic sea-salt, the first-time director Matthew López gets us rooting for the cheeky couple's transition from rivals to romantic bedfellows, boosted by the cinematographer Stephen Goldblatt, who photographs the leads so adoringly that you half-expect them to turn to the camera and hawk a bottle of cologne. Thanks to their playful chemistry, we're sold." She, however, criticized several "over-florid theatrical flourishes". The Guardian's Wendy Ide awarded the film three out of five stars, dubbing it "so slick and polished, it feels obsessively micro-managed rather than directed." However, she praised the charisma of Zakhar Perez and Galitzine and credited it for the film's appeal: "It turns out that watching two impossibly beautiful boys making cow eyes at each other might be just the escapist pulp we need right now."

New York Post's Lauren Sarner thought that the film "has some big flaws, but it's fun and cute rom-com with heart". She criticized Thurman's performance (dubbing it "career-worst"), her Texan accent and the writing of her character, but praised Zakhar Perez's and Galitzine's performances. Sarner also took note of resemblance between Prince Henry and Prince Harry; both princes are spares and their romances with their American lovers lead to strained relationships with their older brothers. Jessie Thompson of The Independent awarded it three out of five stars, summarizing it as "wry and witty at first, but then becomes unstuck as it enters into soap opera mode", additionally drawing comparisons with The Crown and Prince Harry's media tour, and taking note of an "air of liberal fantasy to it all". She characterized the casting of Zakhar Perez and Galitzine as "absurdly [good] ... like cartoon Disney princes made into humans", and Thurman's performance as "delightfully camp".

The Guardian's Benjamin Lee awarded it two out of five stars and dubbed it "well-intentioned yet listless", writing: "Red, White and Royal Blue just isn't the fun, brain-disengaged romp it could have been, any praise going toward intention rather than execution." BBC's Louis Staples thought that the "creaky" formulaic script "often sounds like it was written by ChatGPT", criticized the film's overt leaning into "fictionalised specifics of Anglo-American relations" and into stereotypes of the British and Americans. He negatively compared it to The Princess Diaries (2001), Single All the Way (2021), The Knight Before Christmas (2019), Fire Island (2022) and Bros (2022), before concluding, "If you're looking for a film about beautiful men with perfect hair and sculpted abs, which doesn't demand too much from you, then it might be for you. But if you're expecting it to be in the grade of romcoms that are laugh-out-loud hilarious and actually say something interesting about relationships – or anything beyond lazy clichés – then you'll be royally disappointed."

=== Accolades ===
Awards and nominations for Red, White & Royal Blue
Award	Date of ceremony	Category	Nominee(s)	Result	Ref.
Producers Guild of America Awards	February 25, 2024	Outstanding Producer of Streamed or Televised Motion Pictures	Red, White & Royal Blue	Nominated	
The Queerties	March 12, 2024	Comedy Movie	Red, White & Royal Blue	Runner-up	
GLAAD Media Awards	May 11, 2024	Outstanding Film – Streaming or TV	Red, White & Royal Blue	Nominated	
GLAAD Media Awards	May 11, 2024	Queer Fan Favorite	Red, White & Royal Blue	Won	
Astra TV Awards	August 18, 2024	Best TV Movie	Red, White & Royal Blue	Won	
Astra TV Awards	August 18, 2024	Best Actor in a Limited Series or TV Movie	Nicholas Galitzine	Nominated	
Astra TV Awards	August 18, 2024	Best Directing in a Limited Series or TV Movie	Matthew López	Nominated	
Astra TV Awards	August 18, 2024	Best Writing in a Limited Series or TV Movie	Matthew López and Ted Malawar	Nominated	
Primetime Emmy Awards	September 8, 2024	Outstanding Television Movie	Casey McQuiston, Michael Riley McGrath, Matthew López, Michael S. Constable, Greg Berlanti, and Sarah Schechter	Nominated	
Imagen Awards	September 8, 2024	Best Special or TV Movie	Red, White & Royal Blue	Nominated	
Imagen Awards	September 8, 2024	Best Actor – Comedy	Taylor Zakhar Perez	Nominated	
Artios Awards	February 12, 2025	Outstanding Achievement in Casting – Film, First Released for Television or Streaming	Rich Delia, Kelly Valentine Hendry, Jessica Mescall	Nominated	

== Sequel ==
The cast and filmmakers announced a sequel for the film on May 9, 2024, at a Q&A session after a screening. On October 15, 2025, the sequel was officially greenlit by Amazon. The announcement included the title of the movie, Red, White & Royal Wedding, and its director, Jamie Babbit.

== See also ==
- Young Royals
