= Matthew López (writer) =

American playwright and screenwriter

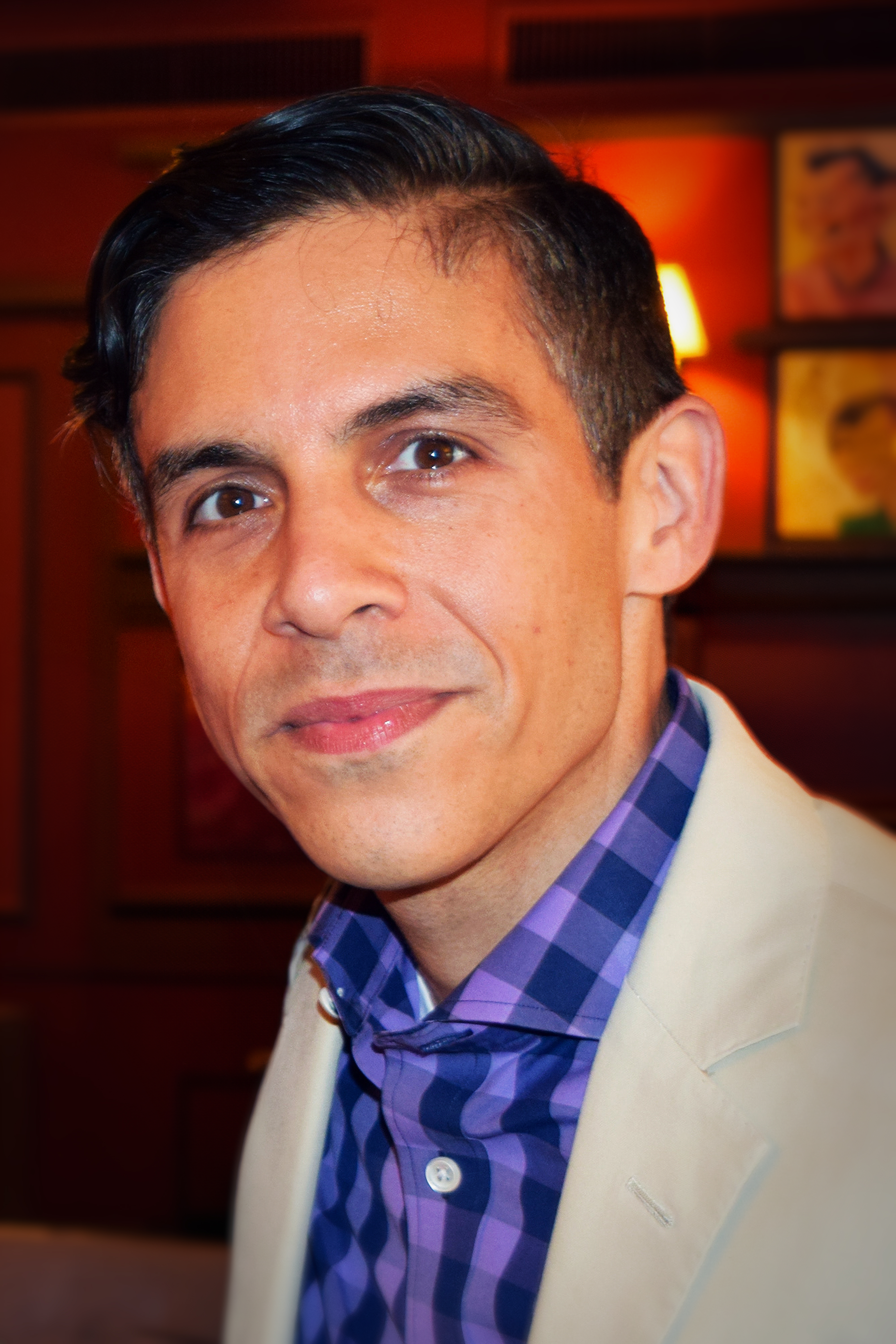
- Born: 1977; Panama City, Florida, U.S.
- Education: University of South Florida (BFA)
- Occupations: Playwright, director, screenwriter

Matthew López is an American playwright, director and screenwriter. His play The Inheritance, directed by Stephen Daldry, premiered at London's Young Vic in 2018, where it was suggested to be "perhaps the most important American play of the century so far." It transferred to the West End later that year, and opened on Broadway in 2019. The Inheritance won a Tony Award, Olivier Award, Drama Desk Award, Evening Standard Award, London Critics Circle Award, Outer Critics Circle Award, Drama League Award, WhatsOnStage Award, and the Southbank Sky Arts Award.

He is the first Latino writer to win the Tony Award for Best Play. In 2023, López received a second Tony Award nomination for co-writing the book of the musical adaptation of the classic film Some Like It Hot, which received the most nominations of any show that season. His two Broadway productions have been nominated for 24 Tony Awards, winning 8, including three acting awards.

In 2023, Lopez made his feature directing debut with Red, White and Royal Blue, which he also adapted from the novel by Casey McQuiston. The film was both a critical and commercial success, debuting at #1 for several weeks on Amazon Prime. In New York, López's work has been seen off-Broadway with The Whipping Man and The Legend of Georgia McBride. Other works include Somewhere, Reverberation, The Sentinels and Zoey's Perfect Wedding.

== Early life and education ==
López was born in Panama City, Florida to two public school teachers. His father, born in San Juan, Puerto Rico, is the older brother of actor Priscilla López. He graduated from the University of South Florida with a bachelor's degree in theatre performance.

== Career ==
=== Theatre ===
==== The Whipping Man ====
López's breakout play The Whipping Man debuted at Luna Stage in Montclair, New Jersey in 2006 and premiered Off-Broadway at the Manhattan Theatre Club on February 1, 2011, directed by Doug Hughes and starring Andre Braugher and Andre Holland. The Off-Broadway production of The Whipping Man was extended four times, and won the 2011 Obie Award for Performance (Braugher) and the 2011 Lucille Lortel Award for Outstanding Lighting Design. López won the John Gassner New Play Award.

The Whipping Man is set in Richmond, Virginia in the immediate aftermath of the American Civil War and concerns two recently freed slaves encountering their former master. The former slaves, like their former master, identify as Jewish. The play examines the unique occurrence of Passover in 1865 beginning the day after Robert E. Lee's surrender at Appomattox. It explores the meaning of freedom, and the various ways people are enslaved — to addictions, to prejudices. In his The New York Times review Charles Isherwood called the play "emotionally potent, almost surreal in the layers of meaning it conjures." Braugher and Holland both earned critical acclaim for their performances. Between 2012 and 2016, The Whipping Man was one of the most widely produced plays in America.

==== Somewhere ====
Somewhere premiered at the Old Globe Theatre in San Diego in September 2011, before moving to Hartford Stage, Hartford, Connecticut. Matthew López was the Playwright-in-Residence at the Old Globe Theatre. The play, featuring a majority Latin cast, concerns a theatrical family living in Manhattan in 1959, as West Side Story captured the zeitgeist. The proposed construction of Lincoln Center and the ensuing demolition of their neighborhood leaves the family to fight for their home and their dreams. Somewhere was directed by Giovanna Sardelli, and featured Matthew López's aunt Priscilla López. Critics lauded the production, comparing López's writing to Tennessee Williams' The Glass Menagerie. The story of Somewhere has roots in López's family history. His father was an extra in the 1961 film adaptation of West Side Story, and appears on screen in the playground, just after the prologue

==== Reverberation ====
López's next play Reverberation premiered at Hartford Stage, Hartford, Connecticut running from February 19, 2015, to March 15, directed by Maxwell Williams and starring Luke Macfarlane. The story follows Jonathan, a young gay New Yorker, who spends increasingly more time holed up in his Astoria apartment following a violent attack that has left him afraid to go out into the world. He is befriended by his new upstairs neighbor, Claire, a Holly Golightly-like character who, despite her active social life, is just as afraid and lonely as Jonathan. The play examines how violence – against women, against the LGBTQ community – impacts the lives of those both directly and indirectly affected by it. Charles Isherwood of The New York Times writes that "the play is marked by a perceptiveness about the echoing loneliness that many urban dwellers live with."

==== The Legend of Georgia McBride ====
The Legend of Georgia McBride debuted at Denver Center for the Performing Arts in 2014, and premiered Off-Broadway at the Lucille Lortel Theatre in 2015. The play tells the story of Casey, a down-on-his-luck Elvis impersonator who is induced to turn his jumpsuits into dresses and become a drag queen. The play toggles between quippy comedy and show-stopping dance numbers, with Charles Isherwood of The New York Times commenting that the play was "full of sass and good spirits – along with a spritz or two of sentimentality." In February 2018, New Regency announced it was developing the film adaptation of the play in association with Jim Parsons' production company. In November 2026, the show was announced to play @sohoplace in London's West End from February to May 2027, with Monét X Change starring.

==== The Inheritance ====
López's play The Inheritance, directed by Stephen Daldry, premiered London's Young Vic Theatre in 2018, where it was hailed by The Daily Telegraph as "perhaps the most important American play of the century so far." It transferred to the Noël Coward Theatre in the West End later that year, and opened on Broadway the following autumn. The Inheritance earned eleven nominations for the 74th Tony Awards, including Best Play, as well as eight nominations at the 2019 Laurence Olivier Awards, winning for Best New Play, Best Director (Stephen Daldry), Best Actor (Kyle Soller), and Best Lighting Design (Jon Clark). López received the Evening Standard Award and Critics Circle Theatre Award for Best New Play. Other awards included the Olivier Award, Drama Desk Award, Evening Standard Award, London Critics Circle Award, Outer Critics Circle Award, Drama League Award, WhatsOnStage Award, and the Southbank Sky Arts Award. López is the first Latino writer to win any of these awards for Best Play. The Inheritance was also selected as the recipient of the GLAAD Media Award for Outstanding Broadway Production.

Set in New York three decades after the height of the AIDS epidemic, The Inheritance wrestles with what it means to be a gay man today, exploring relationships and connections across age and social class and asking what one generation's responsibilities may be to the next. The play is a loose adaptation of E.M. Forster's novel Howards End. The premiere featured a cast that included Vanessa Redgrave, John Benjamin Hickey, and Paul Hilton as Forster himself. The Evening Standard declared the play "a work of rare grace, truth, and beauty." The play premiered on Broadway at the Ethel Barrymore Theatre on September 27, 2019, in previews, with the official opening on November 17. It won the Tony Award for Best play at the 2021 Tony Awards. In June 2020, in honor of the 50th anniversary of the first LGBTQ Pride parade, Queerty named him among the fifty heroes "leading the nation toward equality, acceptance, and dignity for all people".

==== Some Like It Hot ====
López also co-wrote the musical adaptation of the classic film Some Like It Hot, for which he received a Tony Award for Best Book of a Musical nomination. The musical is a radical re-imagining of the film for a modern audience, in which Daphne, played by J Harrison Ghee, begins to reevaluate their gender identity.

López co-wrote the book with Amber Ruffin, with music by Marc Shaiman, lyrics by Scott Wittman and Shaiman, and directed and choreographed by Casey Nicholaw.

=== Film and television ===
López made his directorial debut in summer 2023 with the film adaptation of the LGBTQ+ romantic comedy Red, White & Royal Blue for Amazon Studios. In addition to directing the film, López adapted the script based on Casey McQuiston's bestselling novel. The film depicts a developing love affair between the son of the president of the United States (Taylor Zakhar Perez) and a British prince (Nicholas Galitzine). López is also working on a reimagining of the iconic 1992 Whitney Houston box office hit, The Bodyguard, for Warner Bros, as well as a feature film adaptation of the novel Leading Men for Searchlight Pictures, which centers on Tennessee Williams and his longtime partner Frank Merlo. In October 2020, López signed an overall television development deal with Amazon Studios.

In May 2024, it was announced that López would return to write and direct a sequel to Red, White & Royal Blue. López is co-writing the script together with McQuiston.

== Personal life ==
López is openly gay.

== Awards and nominations ==
| Year | Award | Category | Work | Result | Ref. |
|---|---|---|---|---|---|
| 2011 | Outer Critics Circle Award | John Gassner Award | The Whipping Man | Won | |
| 2014 | Henry Award | Outstanding New Play or Musical | The Legend of Georgia McBride | Won | |
| 2018 | Evening Standard Theatre Award | Best Play | The Inheritance | Won | |
| 2018 | Critics' Circle Theatre Award | Best New Play | The Inheritance | Won | |
| 2019 | Laurence Olivier Award | Best New Play | The Inheritance | Won | |
| 2019 | South Bank Sky Arts Award | Theatre | The Inheritance | Won | |
| 2019 | WhatsOnStage Award | Best New Play | The Inheritance | Won | |
| 2020 | Tony Award | Best Play | The Inheritance | Won | |
| 2020 | Drama Desk Award | Outstanding Play | The Inheritance | Won | |
| 2020 | Drama League Award | Outstanding Production of a Play | The Inheritance | Won | |
| 2020 | New York Drama Critics' Circle Award | Best Play | The Inheritance | Finalist | |
| 2020 | Outer Critics Circle Award | Outstanding New Broadway Play | The Inheritance | Honoree | |
| 2020 | GLAAD Media Award | Outstanding Broadway Production | The Inheritance | Won | |
| 2023 | Tony Award | Best Book of a Musical | Some Like It Hot | Nominated | |
| 2023 | Drama Desk Award | Outstanding Book of a Musical | Some Like It Hot | Won | |
| 2023 | Outer Critics Circle Award | Outstanding Book of a Musical | Some Like It Hot | Nominated | |
| 2024 | Producers Guild Awards | Award for Outstanding Producer of Televised or Streamed Motion Pictures | Red, White & Royal Blue | Nominated | |
| 2024 | GLAAD Media Award | Outstanding Film – Streaming or TV | Red, White & Royal Blue | Nominated | |
| 2024 | GLAAD Media Award | Queer Fan Favorite | Red, White & Royal Blue | Won | |
| 2024 | Primetime Emmy Awards | Outstanding Television Movie | Red, White & Royal Blue | Nominated | |
| 2024 | Astra TV Awards | Best TV Movie | Red, White & Royal Blue | Won | |
| 2024 | Astra TV Awards | Best Directing in a TV Movie | Red, White & Royal Blue | Nominated | |
| 2024 | Astra TV Awards | Best Writing in a TV Movie | Red, White & Royal Blue | Nominated | |
