= Thomas Flynn (British actor) =

British actor

Thomas Flynn is a British actor.

Raised in Oldham, Flynn began training in acting at the age of 6 with the Oldham Theatre Workshop, with his first performance being in a production of Hansel and Gretel. he would then study drama at the Oxford School of Drama.

In July 2022, Flynn was cast as Prince Phillip in Red, White & Royal Blue, a role he will reprise in Red, White & Royal Wedding. Additional roles includes in the television series Bridgerton, Masters of the Air, and Run Away.

== Personal life ==
Flynn identifies as queer.

== Filmography ==
=== Film ===
Year	Title	Role	Notes	References
2020	Little Fish	Hospital Administrator		
2023	Red, White & Royal Blue	Prince Phillip		
2026	Red, White & Royal Wedding †	Prince Phillip	Post-production	

=== Television ===
Year	Title	Role	Notes
2020	Survive	Triage Doctor	1 episode
2021	Britannia	Octavius	1 episode
2022	Bridgerton	Rupert Horton	3 episodes
2022	The Lazarus Project	Holmes	2 episodes
2023	Sister Boniface Mysteries	Billy King	1 episode
2023	A Small Light	Stoepker	Miniseries, 1 episode
2024	Masters of the Air	Col. Sam Barr	Miniseries, 4 episodes
2024	Grace	Fred Northshaw	1 episode
2025	Riot Women	SpongeBob	2 episodes
2025	Run Away	Aaron Corval	Miniseries, 5 episodes

=== Theatre ===
Year	Title	Role	Theatre
2026	The Standard of Living	Duncan Grant	Theatre Royal Haymarket
