= LaToya Morgan =

American screenwriter, producer (active 2004–present)

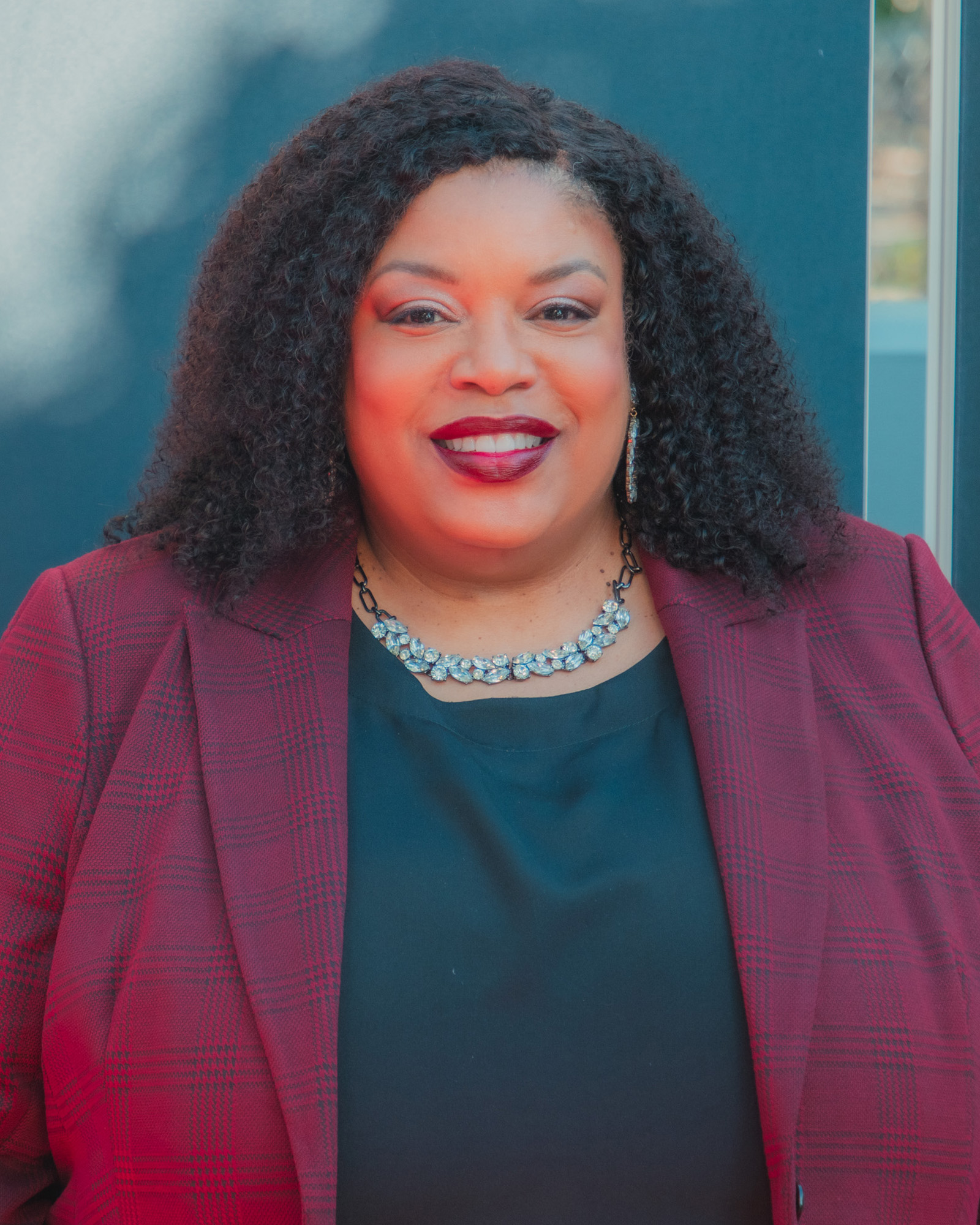
- Morgan in 2026
- Born: Los Angeles, California, U.S.
- Education: AFI Conservatory (MFA)
- Occupations: Writer, producer
- Years active: 2004–present
- Notable work: Duster (co-creator)

LaToya Morgan is an American writer and producer. She was a writer for Parenthood, Shameless, and Complications, and was both writer and co-executive producer for Into the Badlands and Turn: Washington's Spies. She was also a writer and consulting producer for The Walking Dead. She held two multi-year deals with AMC and She signed an overall deal with Warner Bros. Television Group in 2020. Morgan is the co-creator, executive producer and showrunner of the HBO Max series Duster (2025).

== Career ==
=== Television and film ===
Morgan began her screenwriting career as a participant in the Warner Bros. Television Writer's Workshop. Her first screenwriting job was for Showtime's Shameless. She went on to write for Complications, Parenthood, Turn: Washington's Spies, Into the Badlands, and The Walking Dead.

She signed her first of two overall deals with AMC in 2016, the last of which expired in 2020. She had multiple requests from other employers before signing with AMC. She was an executive producer for an adaptation of The Age of Miracles produced by AMC Studios for HBO Max. She was also a writer and co-executive producer for Into the Badlands, and a writer and consulting producer for The Walking Dead. She oversaw AMC's inclusion initiative designed to create pathways for diverse emerging writers. Through the initiative she developed two projects, Farmhand and Of Two Minds.

In July 2020, Morgan signed an overall deal with Warner Bros. Television Group through her newly launched production company TinkerToy Productions. That year, Morgan won the Telling Our Stories short film competition hosted by WrapWomen and received distribution on Starz for the film Team Marilyn.

In 2022 it was announced that Morgan will write the screenplay for the upcoming Night of the Living Dead reboot film, to be directed by Nikyatu Jusu.

She collaborated with J.J. Abrams to develop a crime drama, Duster, that HBO Max ordered in 2020. The series premiered in May 2025 and was cancelled after one season. In September 2025, she signed a mini first-look deal with Universal TV, under which she will write and co-executive produce the adaptation of the novel The Paris Widow by Kimberly Belle.

=== Graphic novels ===
Morgan's debut graphic novel, Dark Blood, was released in fall 2021 by Boom! Studios. She also wrote the graphic novel series Creed: The Next Round as a franchise tie-in for the film Creed III for Michael B. Jordan's company Outlier Society, which was published in 2023 by Boom! Studios. DC Comics selected Morgan to write a short story for the horror anthology series DC Horror Presents (2025).

=== Other work ===
In April 2019 she created the hashtag #WGAStaffingBoost to help connect WGA writers seeking work amid the union's dispute with the Association of Talent Agents (ATA).

== Personal life ==
Morgan was born and raised in Los Angeles, California, where she resides. She received her MFA in screenwriting from the AFI Conservatory in 2005.

== Awards and nominations ==
Year	Award	Category	Nominated work	Result
2016	NAACP Image Awards	Outstanding Writing in a Drama Series	Turn: Washington's Spies	Nominated
2017	NAACP Image Awards	Outstanding Writing in a Drama Series	Turn: Washington's Spies	Nominated
2025	Women's Image Network Award	Best Drama Series	Duster	Won
2025	Golden Tomato Awards	Best Action/Adventure Series	Duster	Nominated
2025	Golden Trailer Awards	Best Action - TV/Streaming Series	Duster	Nominated
2026	Saturn Award	Best Action/Adventure Television Series	Duster	Won

== Filmography ==
Year	Title	Director	Writer	Producer	Notes	Ref.
2012	Shameless	No	Yes	No		
2012–2013	Parenthood	No	Yes	No		
2013	American Horror Story: The Orderly	No	Yes	No		
2014–2017	Turn: Washington's Spies	No	Yes	Yes	Co-executive producer	
2015	Complications	No	Yes	No		
2015	Cobalt 60	No	Yes	Yes	Short film	
2017–2018	Into the Badlands	No	Yes	Yes	Co-executive producer	
2019	Team Marilyn	Yes	Yes	Yes	Short film; executive producer	
2019–2021	The Walking Dead	No	Yes	Yes	Consulting producer	
2025	Duster	No	Yes	Yes	Co-creator and executive producer	
