= Parvez Qadir =

British actor

Parvez Qadir is a British actor from Rochdale.

He appeared as Jaz in all three series of the BBC television series The Cops and has also appeared in Coronation Street and in the Mike Leigh film All or Nothing. In 2008, he appeared in Spooks: Code 9.

== Credits ==
=== Television ===
Year	Title	Role	Notes
1993	Cracker	Petrol Station Attendant	Episode: To Say I Love You: Part 3
1994	Screen Two		Episode: A Little Bit of Lippy
1994	New Voices		Episode: The Quiet Lifer
1995	Blood and Peaches	Arif	TV movie
1997	Common as Muck	Peri	Series 2, episode 3
1997	Born to Run		
1998	The Cops	PC Jaz Shundara	In 21 episodes (1998-2001)
2002	Casualty	Dave	Episode: You're Going Home in the Back of an Ambulance
2002	Blood Strangers	Manzar (Manny) Wadid / Wahid	
2002	Cutting It	Jared Khan	Series 1, episode 5
2002	Coronation Street	Naveen Alahan	In 7 episodes (2002-2003)
2002	Stan the Man	Vijay	
2003	Murphy's Law	Computer Expert / Boffin	Episode: Kiss and Tell
2004	Doctors	Paul Dodhia	Episode: No Angel
2004	The Grid	Hamid Samoudi	In all 6 episodes
2005	Dad	Ian Greaves	TV movie
2005	Rome	Tanjit	Episode: The Ram has Touched the Wall
2006	Life on Mars	Raimes' Psychiatrist	Series 1, episode 1
2006	Dalziel and Pascoe	Rashid Razzaq	Episode: Wrong Place, Wrong Time (parts 1 and 2)
2006	The Street	Solicitor / Defence Solicitor	Episodes: The Accident and Stan
2006	The Chase	Doctor	Series 1, episode 7
2006	The Applicant	"Eddie" Ahmed	Short film
2008	Spooks: Code 9	Saeed Khan (director-general of MI6)	Series 1, episodes 2 & 6
2012	Doctors	Asim Kherdany	Series 14, episode 142: Hold Sway
2013	Lawless	Business Man	
unknown	Living It		
unknown	Medics		
unknown	Role Shift		

=== Film ===
Year	Title	Role	Notes
1997	My Son the Fanatic	Acolyte	
2000	Broken Wings		Short Film
2000	Arabian Nights		
2002	All or Nothing	Passenger	
2013	Jadoo	Jindar	

=== Theatre ===
Year	Title	Role	Notes
1995	The Immigrant Song		Cars in Water
1999	Two Days As A Tiger		M6 Theatre Company
unknown	Excluded		GW Theatre Company
2000	The Unsuitable Girl / Unsuitable Girls		Contact Theatre, Manchester
unknown	Heroes		Leicester Haymarket
2002	Quids N’ Dimps		Manchester Royal Exchange
2002	Othello	Iago	Leicester Haymarket
2003	Mr Placebo	Tariq	Traverse Theatre/Plymouth Theatre Royal
2004	Neville’s Island		Oldham Coliseum

=== Radio ===
Year	Title	Role	Notes
unknown	The Shoddies		BBC Leeds
2000	In a Grove	Woodcutter	BBC R4
unknown	The Penalty		BBC R4
2003	Eenie Meenie Macka Racka	Siddeeq	BBC R4
unknown	The Death of Dr Morgan		BBC R4
2007	Mothercloud	Conrad	BBC R4
2007	Take-Away: If You Can't Stand the Heat...	Paul	BBC R4
2008	Road Trip	Zak	BBC R4
2009	Pick Ups: series 2	Rebel / Alan	BBC R4 Extra
