= The Cops (British TV series) =

British police procedural TV series (1998–2001)

- Also known as: Stanton Blues
- Genre: Police procedural
- Created by: Jimmy Gardner; Robert Jones; Anita J. Pandolfo
- Directed by: Harry Bradbeer; Alrick Riley; Kenneth Glenaan
- Starring: Katy Cavanagh; Rob Dixon; John Henshaw; Clare McGlinn; Steve Jackson; Jack Marsden; Danny Seward; Parvez Qadir; Steve Garti; Mark Chatterton; David Crellin; Ken Kitson
- Country of origin: United Kingdom
- Original language: English
- No. of series: 3
- No. of episodes: 24

Production
- Executive producer: Tony Garnett
- Producer: Eric Coulter
- Production locations: Bolton, Greater Manchester, England
- Cinematography: Mark Waters
- Editors: Paul Endacott; Colin Monie; Liana Del Giudice
- Running time: 50 minutes
- Production company: World Productions

Original release
- Network: BBC Two
- Release: 19 October 1998 – 11 April 2001

The Cops is a British television police procedural drama series created by Jimmy Gardner, Robert Jones, and Anita J. Pandolfo, first broadcast on BBC Two on 19 October 1998. Produced by World Productions, the series follows the lives of one shift of uniform officers based at Christie Road Police Station in the fictional town of Stanton, Greater Manchester. Billed as another attempt by the BBC to rival The Bill, the series was notable for its documentary-style camerawork and uncompromising portrayal of the police force. Although the series featured a number of notable actors across three series, Katy Cavanagh, Rob Dixon, and John Henshaw remained as the principal cast throughout.

The series was primarily filmed in Bolton, Greater Manchester. The first series was so controversial in its depiction of the police force that official police advice was withdrawn before the second series went into production. Twenty-four episodes were broadcast in three series, although the third series saw a slight change in the series format, featuring three two-part episodes each loosely tied together with a story arc. Although the second series attracted strong viewing figures and critical acclaim, resulting in the commission of a third series, creator Robert Jones later confirmed that the third series was written as a way of 'bringing The Cops to a close', with the final episode broadcast on 11 April 2001.

The first series was released on VHS on 24 January 2000, available as four individual volumes or as a complete box set. Both the second and third series remain commercially unreleased. All three series received a single rerun on UKTV Drama in the early 2000s. In June 2024, BBC Four began reshowing the first series and all three series appeared on BBC iPlayer.

== Reception ==
The programme won back-to-back British Academy Television Awards in the Best Drama Series category in 1999 and 2000 and was nominated for a third time in 2001, narrowly losing out to Clocking Off. Gordon Beverage, writing for the official 2000 BAFTA magazine, wrote; "All it took was a line of coke and the nation was hooked. It was a masterstroke from one of British television's most successful directors, but then that's what we've come to expect from Tony Garnett."

"Who else would have the nerve and ingenuity to kick off a new police drama with a WPC snorting Class A in a toilet cubicle? Dixon of Dock Green it definitely isn't, much to the chagrin of the duty office, not to mention the numerous members of the force who had hoped for something a little less provocative with The Cops. But pulling punches is not Tony's style."

Critical reception was also extremely positive, with Mark Walker for Amazon writing; "It's grim up North for the cops in The Cops. Bolton, Lancashire doubles for the fictional Northern town of Stanton; Bolton's not such a bad place in reality, but here it looks like war-torn Beirut. Unlike their soft Southern counterparts, the cops in Stanton swear copiously, get involved in fistfights and generally behave badly. Little wonder when you contemplate the grim reality of their daily round among all the "dirty, thieving, lying scumbags" they have to deal with."

"This is soap opera masquerading as documentary, shot in subjective fly-on-the-wall fashion and with semi-improvised dialogue that enhances the documentary feel. There's no hummable theme tune and every episode leaps without preamble in media res into the thick of the action. The result is a show with all the character-driven tension of a soap combined with the voyeurism and unpredictability of docudrama. It's an original combination that makes for compulsive viewing."

== Cast ==
- Katy Cavanagh as PC Mel Draper
- Rob Dixon as Sgt Edward "Ed" Giffen
- John Henshaw as PC Roy Brammell
- Clare McGlinn as PC/Acting Sgt Natalie Metcalf
- Danny Seward as PC Dean Wishaw
- Parvez Qadir as PC/DC Jaz Shundara
- Steve Garti as PC Colin Jellicoe
- Steve Jackson as PC Mike Thompson (Series 1–2)
- Jack Mardsen as PC Danny Rylance (Series 1–2)
- Paulette Williams as PC Amanda Kennett (Series 2)
- Kitty Simpson as PC Karen McGuire (Series 3)
- Michael McNally as PC John Martins (Series 3)
- Ken Kitson as Insp John Stowe
- Mark Chatterton as Ch Insp Tim Newland
- David Crellin as DS/Sgt/Insp Alan Wakefield
- Sue Cleaver as Duty Sgt Standish (Series 1)
- David Prosho as Duty Sgt Michaelson (Series 2–3)
- Jan Pearson as Maggie Hayes, HR Manager (Series 2–3)
- Margaret Blakemore as Cindy, CAD Operator

== Episodes ==
=== Series 1 (1998) ===
No.	Title	Directed by	Written by	Original release date	Viewers (millions)
1	"Potshots"	Harry Bradbeer	Jimmy Gardner	19 October 1998	6.03
2	"Wasted"	Harry Bradbeer	Robert Jones	26 October 1998	4.24
3	"Swinging Hammers"	Harry Bradbeer	Anita J. Pandolfo	2 November 1998	3.53
4	"Sticks and Stones"	Alrick Riley	Jimmy Gardner	9 November 1998	3.51
5	"Fall Out"	Alrick Riley	Anita J. Pandolfo	16 November 1998	3.23
6	"Top of the Game"	Alrick Riley	Stephen Brady	23 November 1998	3.29
7	"Culminate"	Harry Bradbeer	James Quirk	30 November 1998	3.37
8	"Walking Disaster"	Harry Bradbeer	Robert Jones	7 December 1998	2.82

=== Series 2 (1999) ===
No.	Title	Directed by	Written by	Original release date	Viewers (millions)
1	"Walking the Line"	Harry Bradbeer	Robert Jones	11 October 1999	3.19
DS Wakefield, now in uniform, discovers dope in PC Draper's apartment allegedly belonging to her lodger, and proceeds to blackmail her with it. PC Metcalf is made a temporary sergeant following the death of Sgt Giffen's mother. She oversees an attack in custody on PC Thompson and investigates a domestic with PCs Brammell and Wishaw. All the while she worries that Ch Insp Newland will charge her for Brian Skillet's death. Meanwhile, Newland is at the front of a public meeting regarding the state of Skeetsmoor where tensions remain high after Skillet's death, while PC Jellicoe uses his car to escort a young lad back home, which is easier said than done. PCs Wishaw and Thompson apprehend two shoplifters, one of whom accuses Wishaw of sexual harassment.
2	"Taking Liberties"	Harry Bradbeer	Jimmy Gardner	18 October 1999	2.75
PCs Brammell and Wishaw struggle in catching a bail-jumper. Their first visit leads them to 13-year-old Debbie Sharpe, who has sold many of her and her mother's belongings to get drug money. PC Draper eventually speaks to this girl as well and must return her to her home after she tries to run away. Eventually, a run-in with PC Rylands, still slightly on-edge from the funeral incident, leads them to a pub, where Wishaw also notices his father. Wishaw hasn't spoken to his dad in six years, and is troubled by his potential intentions. Meanwhile, PC Draper takes a shine to a community leader and drug counsellor in Skeetsmoor, creating tension with PC Shundara. PC Brammell runs into Vince Graves again and gives him further trouble.
3	"Fallen Angels"	Harry Bradbeer	Stephen Brady	25 October 1999	2.28
After a report meeting with a psychiatrist, PC Rylands is deemed unfit to return to the force. Outraged by this, he tries to patch things up with Dave Wilcox, the father of the dead child, where his situation worsens. PCs Jellicoe and Thompson are in disagreement when an elderly drunk is causing problems to his partner. PC Metcalf takes an immediate dislike to new probationer PC Kennett, and Wakefield doesn't seem to help matters. PC Brammell is told he has high blood pressure by his doctor, and his wife insists that he starts dieting, to his dislike. PC Thompson is undergoing marriage problems and its end is looking likely. PC Jellicoe tries to help a man who has seemingly forgotten his identity while also trying to brush up for a pub quiz which he is attending with some fellow PCs.
4	"The Long Game"	Alrick Riley	Steve Lawson	1 November 1999	2.47
PC Wishaw apprehends scrote Craig Davo after he reports that Debbie Sharpe has OD'd. Following her death, Sgt Giffen is eager to find out who she got the drugs from, but when Ch Insp Newland asks him to wait, Giffen decides to take matters into his own hands: by prying the information out of Davo, already on edge from the incident. After Terry Reynolds' name is mentioned, the officers plan a raid. Meanwhile, PC Wishaw is sent on a community spree to keep him away from the raid. PC Thompson takes pity on a divorced father caught shoplifting a toy for his daughter's birthday. PC Jellicoe fancies a change of pace in his job.
5	"War of Words"	Alrick Riley	Robert Jones	8 November 1999	2.18
News that Terry Reynolds has been released on bail hits Skeetsmoor on the day of Debbie Sharpe's funeral, which Mel has been sent to monitor. The officers are searching for Craig Davo again in order to enhance the investigation on Sharpe's death, where new information comes to light about Craig's brother. Draper gets more involved in the community centre following her romantic liaison with leader Darrll Stone, leading to muttered rumours between officers. PC Wishaw brings out new inspector Maggie Hayes while searching for Craig. PCs Thompson and Kennett investigate a van full of stolen bikes, but when it turns out the culprit can't speak English, PC Shundara is roped in.
6	"Clifftop"	Kenneth Glenaan	Jane English	15 November 1999	2.63
Mel is the subject of ridicule after partaking in a community vigil while investigating a known sex offender who has begun a relationship with a 14-year-old girl. Giffen's doubts about Amanda rise after an incident with an elderly man parked in a disabled spot gets way out of hand. Colin's drug talk in a nearby primary school results in a surprising lead. Mike deals with two rowdy girls who have reported a flasher in the area, but when he sees one of them after the investigation has finished, the situation turns awry.
7	"Ignorance and Suggestion"	Kenneth Glenaan	Stephen Brady	22 November 1999	2.51
Mike plays a prank on Amanda which goes too far, but when she tries to file a complaint against the officers involved, Giffen refuses to listen, which results in her accusing him of sexual assault. Natalie is refused to entry to a gentleman's club, who are having problems with a stripper who has stolen their wallets. Roy and Dean discover Jaz has been moonlighting as a cab driver when an angry punter turns up at his bosses' office with a broken taillight. The Ifraz's neighbour reports the family for anti social behaviour.
8	"Deep Water"	Kenneth Glenaan	Robert Jones	29 November 1999	2.53
An investigation takes place following Amanda's sexual harassment allegations against Giffen. Newland is keen to keep her on the force, so when Mike is brought to the end of his tether by a prisoner who doesn't fancy taking a shower, he decides to take the blame, and resign. Mel goes undercover in an attempt to flush out the flasher. When she identifies Sahid Ifraz's brother as the potential suspect, Roy's attempted arrest leaves him with egg on his face, and determined to seek his own type of revenge.
9	"Hemorrhage"	Alrick Riley	Jane English	6 December 1999	2.75
Mel is caught out when she arrives, plain-clothed, at the scene of Terry Reynolds' house being trashed, but then tries to cover her tracks to avoid having to identify the culprits. Meanwhile, Sharon Reynolds is raped by two of the Caffrey brothers, but she refuses to co-operate with the police. Mel discovers that Darrell provided the information which lead to the attack on the Reynolds' home, leading her to break off their relationship.
10	"An Act of Revenge"	Alrick Riley	Jimmy Gardner	13 December 1999	2.59
Jaz is asked to privately look into the assault on Karim Ifraz when his family suspect police involvement. Roy and Dean are tasked with helping the fraud squad with an operation to fish out taxi drivers who are illegally singing on. Natalie organises a night out to celebrate her promotion, but Mel has other ideas on how to spend her weekend. Roy's wife Ellen is hospitalised, but he soon discovers that's the least of his problems, when he is confronted by Karim Ifraz's relatives – who are determined to get answers.

=== Series 3 (2000–2001) ===
No.	Title	Directed by	Written by	Original release date
1	"Distance – Part 1"	Kenneth Glenaan	Jimmy Gardner	18 September 2000
The morning after the party, Natalie finds herself waking up next to Giffen. However, more serious concerns soon come to the fore with the case of a pregnant runaway teenager, whom Giffen and Wakefield want returning to her family. Meanwhile, with his wife critical in hospital, Roy decides to give Newland a piece of his mind. Mel fails to turn up for her shift, having spent a long weekend in Ibiza. Dean is partnered with new transfer John Martins, and the pair end up exchanging words after dealing with a scuffle in a pub.
2	"Distance – Part 2"	Kenneth Glenaan	Jimmy Gardener	19 September 2000
Coming off shift from the night before, Dean and his brother Colin are the victims of an unprovoked attack at Stanton train station. Roy is called back into work to help with the search for the perpetrators. CCTV shows the three men whom Dean and John arrested the previous night, just before the attack took place. Meanwhile, Natalie's continued plight to help pregnant runaway Tracy leads her to a suspected paedophile. Wakefield reveals he has been given the Inspector's job in light of Stowe's retirement.
3	"All Work, No Play – Part 1"	Alrick Riley	Stephen Brady	21 March 2001
Mel and Roy are called to an assault at the home of notorious drug dealers The Caffreys. Giffen executes a warrant on a man wanted for armed robbery, unaware the warrant expired months before. John deals with an unusual burglary, and discovers the victim is the girlfriend of Ciaran Caffrey. Suspecting Caffrey will seek his own brand of justice on the man response, Giffen seizes his opportunity to infiltrate the Caffreys, and orders an illegal surveillance operation, which leads to an arrest – until Newland gets wind.
4	"All Work, No Play – Part 2"	Alrick Riley	Stephen Brady	28 March 2001
Giffen and Wakefield continue to press Ciaran Caffrey for information. He reluctantly reveals he has kept a diary of information which could finally help put his father behind bars. But when Roy is sent to retrieve the diary, he finds that Ciaran's girlfriend Carly has committed suicide. As her father threatens to make an official complaint, backed into a corner, and with pressure from Newland mounting, Giffen blackmails Wakefield over his attempts to get John to write up a false retraction from Tommy Nimmo.
5	"Small Mercies - Part 1"	Kenneth Glenaan	Robert Jones	4 April 2001
Roy struggles to deal with the death of his wife. Attending an eviction, he discovers the remaining sitting tenant of a building set to be demolished is none other than her first husband's sister. Natalie and Dean attend a fracas at a local university, where student Shona Molloy accuses one of her fellow peers of sleeping with her boyfriend. Jellicoe tries to intimidate his wife's new lover by throwing him in the back of the police van, but the plan backfires when he overturns the van during a pursuit.
6	"Small Mercies - Part 2"	Kenneth Glenaan	Robert Jones	11 April 2001
Mel gets too involved as she tries to establish the motive behind the attack committed by Shona Molloy. Meanwhile, Roy has a day of two halves, confronting the parents of a dead teenager whom he suspects have stolen flowers from his wife's grave, and trying to track down his niece, who has gone missing. Jellicoe panics that Wakefield is going to suspend him for overturning the van. After having a heart to heart with Roy, Mel decides it might be time to leave Stanton - and pursue a change of career.
