= Danny Seward =

British television actor and singer-songwriter

Danny Seward is a British television actor and singer-songwriter who was born in Salford, Greater Manchester, England.

He started his career at the age of 15 under the tuition of David Johnson at the Oldham Theatre Workshop. He landed his first TV role in the soap Emmerdale for three episodes, playing Greg Cox. Soon after, he won a major television role playing the part of cocky Police Constable Dean Wishaw in BBC2's award-winning TV series The Cops. The show won British Academy Television Award for Best Drama Series in 1999 and 2000, plus a Royal Television Society award.

During 2001–2005, Seward appeared on the ITV drama series Where The Heart Is, playing Joe Beresford. His character was involved in a musical storyline, which led EMI to sign him to record an album.

Seward's debut album Where My Heart Is features two self-penned tracks, including "Heart of A Winner" inspired by British boxing champion Ricky Hatton). He subsequently developed the idea for a DVD titled Ricky Hatton - A Life Story. Seward was executive producer for the DVD, which features "Heart Of A Winner" as its title theme, as well as a music video for the song along with an interview with Hatton and Seward.

In December 2005, Seward sang alongside Elaine Paige and John Barrowman in a Christmas concert performed at the Birmingham Symphony Hall with the BBC Symphony Orchestra. The show featured him on piano and was aired on BBC Radio 2 as part of their Christmas season.

2007 saw Seward appear in The Tudors, alongside Jonathan Rhys Meyers. Alongside his acting work, he went on to study a degree in music production. His acting appearances whilst at university included Survivors (BBC1), Doctors, and Monroe (ITV). He also starred as the lead in "Robin Hood", as Robin, at the Norwich Theatre Royal, alongside Tony Slattery and Helen Atkinson Wood.

Seward later appeared in Happy Valley with Sarah Lancashire. In 2017, he released his second album, Uncovered, which he wrote, arranged and produced collection of original.

== Filmography ==
- Coronation Street
- Heartbeat
- Peak Practice
- Redcap
- Survivors
- The Tudors
- Where The Heart Is
- Moving On
