= Duster (TV series) =

2025 television series

- Genre: Crime thriller
- Created by: J. J. Abrams; LaToya Morgan
- Showrunner: LaToya Morgan
- Starring: Josh Holloway; Rachel Hilson; Asivak Koostachin; Sydney Elisabeth; Benjamin Charles Watson; Camille Guaty; Adriana Aluna Martinez; Greg Grunberg; Keith David
- Music by: Laura Karpman
- Country of origin: United States
- Original language: English
- No. of seasons: 1
- No. of episodes: 8

Production
- Executive producers: Steph Green; Rachel Rusch Rich; LaToya Morgan; J. J. Abrams
- Producers: Andrew Balek; Lucas Brown Eyes
- Cinematography: Carmen Cabana
- Running time: 52 minutes
- Production companies: Bad Robot Productions; TinkerToy Productions; Warner Bros. Television

Original release
- Network: Max
- Release: May 15 – July 3, 2025

Duster is an American crime thriller series created by J. J. Abrams and LaToya Morgan and starring Josh Holloway, Rachel Hilson, and Keith David. The show is set in 1972; Hilson portrays the FBI's first black woman agent and Holloway plays a getaway driver using a 1970 Plymouth Duster. Duster premiered on HBO Max on May 15, 2025. In July 2025, the series was canceled after one season.

== Premise ==
In the Southwest in 1972, the FBI's first black woman agent (Rachel Hilson) works to stop a crime syndicate boss (Keith David) with the assistance of a talented getaway driver (Josh Holloway).

== Cast ==
=== Main ===
- Josh Holloway as Jim Ellis
- Rachel Hilson as Nina Hayes
- Asivak Koostachin as Awan Bitsui
- Sydney Elisabeth as Genesis Saxton
- Benjamin Charles Watson as Royce Saxton
- Camille Guaty as Izzy Reyna
- Adriana Aluna Martinez as Luna Reyna
- Greg Grunberg as Nathan Abbott
- Keith David as Ezra Saxton

=== Recurring ===
- Corbin Bernsen as Wade Ellis
- Gail O'Grady as Charlotte Dean-Ellis
- Donal Logue as Sergeant Groomes
- Kevin Chamberlin as Bob Temple
- Sofia Vassilieva as Jessica-Lorraine Sims
- Dan Tracy as Agent Chad Grant
- Evan Jones as Billy Mahoney

== Episodes ==
No.	Title	Directed by	Written by	Original release date
1	"Baltimore Changes Everything"	Steph Green	J. J. Abrams & LaToya Morgan	May 15, 2025
2	"Suspicious Minds"	Steph Green	LaToya Morgan & J. J. Abrams	May 22, 2025
3	"You're No Good"	Darren Grant	J. J. Abrams & LaToya Morgan	May 29, 2025
4	"Criminalus Velocitus Super-Sonicus"	Darren Grant	Sue Chung	June 5, 2025
5	"Ravishing Light and Glory"	Steph Green	Lucas Brown Eyes	June 12, 2025
6	"Meet by the Clothes"	Steph Green	Matt Lambert	June 19, 2025
7	"K-129"	Darren Grant	Michael Horowitz	June 26, 2025
8	"66 Reno Split"	Darren Grant	LaToya Morgan	July 3, 2025

== Production ==
The series was given a straight to series green-light at HBO Max in April 2020, as part of J. J. Abrams' overall deal at WarnerMedia. The series was co-created and co-written by Abrams and LaToya Morgan. The series has eight episodes, with the first three written by the creators. Steph Green is also an executive producer and directed the first two episodes.

In March 2021, Josh Holloway was cast to star in the pilot, with filming beginning in October 2021 in Tucson. In February 2023, the series was officially given a series order, with Rachel Hilson announced as a co-lead. Corbin Bernsen was announced in a recurring role the following month.

Production for the full series began in April 2023 in Albuquerque, New Mexico and the surrounding areas. In May, it was suspended due to the 2023 WGA strike. Before the strike, the pilot was shot in downtown Tucson and parts of Pima County, Arizona, from September through mid-November 2021.

On July 9, 2025, Max cancelled the series after one season.

=== Cars ===
Ted Moser served as the picture car coordinator for Duster and procured over 250 vehicles for the show. Four separate cars were sourced for the titular 1970 Plymouth Duster 340 driven by Holloway's character Jim — one "hero car" for filming only, detailed enough for close-ups, and three other stunt cars modified for camera equipment and retrofitted with automatic transmissions. Holloway took a stunt driving class in preparation for the role and filmed many of his own driving scenes; stunt driver Corey Eubanks performed the rest. Hilson's character Nina drives a 1966 Plymouth Belvedere. One scene featuring several BMWs was originally written with Audis in mind.

== Release ==
A teaser trailer was released on March 19, 2025. The official trailer was released on April 30, 2025. Duster premiered on Max on May 15, 2025, with successive episodes released weekly thereafter.

== Reception ==
On the review aggregator website Rotten Tomatoes, the series has an approval rating of 92% based on reviews from 35 critics. The website's critical consensus reads, "Making great use of Josh Holloway's rugged charm and a retro aesthetic that recalls 1970s television, Duster slaps a fresh coat of paint on a vintage vehicle." Metacritic, which uses a weighted average, gave it a score of 72 out of 100, based on reviews from 22 critics, indicating "generally favorable" reviews.
