= The Standard of Living =

Play by James Graham

- Original language: English
- Written by: James Graham
- Subject: John Maynard Keynes
- Genre: Political drama

Premiere
- Date: 29 September 2026
- Place: Theatre Royal Haymarket
- Directed by: Nicholas Hytner

The Standard of Living is a play by James Graham, based on the life of the founding father of macroeconomics and Bloomsbury Group member John Maynard Keynes.

Directed by Nicholas Hytner, the world premiere production of The Standard of Living opened at the Theatre Royal Haymarket in September 2026.

== Background ==
The Standard of Living was written by James Graham, with direction by Nicholas Hytner. The play is set between 1917 and 1946, and revolves around the life of economist and core member of the Bloomsbury Group John Maynard Keynes. The play utilises dance throughout, including scene changes and includes short extracts from ballets including La Boutique fantasque, The Firebird and Les Sylphides.

The original productions featured design by Bob Crowley, costumes by Jenny Beavan, lighting by Bruno Poet, projections by Luke Halls, compositions by Frank Moon and sound design by Carolyn Downing. Additional movement direction was provided by James Cousins, with Edward Watson acting as a ballet consultant.

== Production ==
The play began previews at the Theatre Royal Haymarket on 21 September 2026, ahead of an official opening night on 29 September, for a limited run until 12 December 2026. Lead casting included Rory Kinnear as John Maynard Keynes, Natalia Osipova as ballerina and Keynes's wife Lydia Lopokova, and Thomas Flynn as Duncan Grant.

A typical London performance runs two hours and thirty minutes, including one interval.

== Cast and characters ==
Character	World Premiere
Character	2026
John Maynard Keynes	Rory Kinnear
Lydia Lopokova	Natalia Osipova
Duncan Grant	Thomas Flynn
Friedrich Hayek	Laurie Kynaston
Lytton Strachey	Pip Carter
Dora Carrington	Agatha Enecio
Virginia Woolf	Naomi Frederick
Vanessa Bell	Claire Price
William Beveridge	George Taylor

== Critical reception ==
The play received mixed reviews.
