= Rachel Hilson =

American actress (born 1995)

- Born: Rachel Naomi Hilson; 1995 (age 30–31); Baltimore, Maryland, U.S.
- Education: New York University
- Occupations: Actress; writer
- Years active: 2010–present

Rachel Naomi Hilson (born 1995) is an American actress. She started her career in 2010 with a recurring role on the CBS legal drama The Good Wife as Nisa Dalmar. In 2025, she performed the co-lead role as FBI agent Nina Hayes in the Max crime thriller series Duster. She has also had recurring roles on NBC's Rise and This Is Us and a lead role on the Hulu teen drama Love, Victor.

== Early life and education ==
Rachel Naomi Hilson was born in 1995 in Baltimore, Maryland to Anita and Robert Hilson. She has a sister named Kimberly.

Hilson began dancing at age 3. While she had many aspirations, her passion for dance stuck. Hilson told Backstage "I dedicated my life to Nutcrackers, spring recitals, dance camps" and recreating scenes from the 2000 movie Center Stage as Eva. Hilson was discovered by an agent at age 12 and took up acting. That summer, her mother convinced Hilson to attend the Broadway Artist Alliance in New York. She was then recruited by Nancy Carson of the Carson-Adler Agency, who would later become her agent, to dance in the children's musical series LazyTown. After traveling to Iceland with her mom for the tapings, Hilson signed with Carson a few months later. From there, she auditioned for the Baltimore School for the Arts (BSA). At BSA, Hilson continued dancing and acting, but also participated in sports. Hilson credited her high school theater program with helping her overcome her shyness.

Hilson attended the New York University's Gallatin School of Individualized Study, where she created her own curriculum. Throughout her college career, Hilson performed in several theatre productions including Hamlet. She graduated in 2018 with a concentration in Writing and Performing Race. She worked part-time as a bread salesman, even serving actress Lupita Nyong'o at one point.

== Career ==
Living in Baltimore, Hilson and her mother would take bus rides to New York for auditions. One of the first auditions she booked was the recurring role of Nisa on The Good Wife when she was 15. Over the next decade, Hilson appeared in episodes of Royal Pains, Elementary, Nurse Jackie, The Affair, Madam Secretary, The Americans, Law & Order: Special Victims Unit and First Wives Club.

Hilson starred opposite Halle Berry in her first feature film, Kings, which premiered at the 2017 Toronto International Film Festival. She described the project was a "dream come true". That same year, she had a recurring role as Harmony on NBC's short lived musical drama, Rise.

In 2019, Hilson recurred on This Is Us as the teenage version Beth Pearson, played by Susan Kelechi Watson. In August 2019, Hilson replaced Johnny Sequoyah as Mia in Love, Victor, the sequel to the 2018 film, Love, Simon . This was her first role as a series regular.

On August 21, 2021, Hilson joined the cast of HBO's Winning Time: The Rise of the Lakers Dynasty.

In 2025 she was a co-lead on the Max series Duster opposite Josh Holloway.

== Filmography ==
=== Film ===
Year	Title	Role	Notes
2013	Cass	Cass Morris	Lead role
2017	Night	Jess	Short film
2017	Kings	Nicole Patterson	Independent film
2019	As they Slept	Eleanor	Short film
2023	Red, White & Royal Blue	Nora Holleran	
TBA	Judgment Day	TBA	Post-production
TBA	Red, White & Royal Wedding	Nora Holleran	Post-production

=== Television ===
Year	Title	Role	Notes
2010	The Good Wife	Nisa Dalmar	Recurring role: 7 Episodes
2012	Royal Pains	Niece 1	Episode: "Sand Legs"
2015	Elementary	Lexi	Episode: "Seed Money"
2015	The Slap	Liz	Episode: "Connie"
2015	Nurse Jackie	Patient	Episode: "Jackie and the Wolf"
2015	The Affair	Student Tour Guide	Episode: "208"
2016	Madam Secretary	Becca	Episode: "Higher Learning"
2017	The Americans	Linda	Episode: "The Soviet Division"
2018	Law & Order: Special Victims Unit	Tiana Williams	Episode: "Guardian"
2018	Rise	Harmony Curtis	Recurring role: 10 Episodes
2019	Fosse/Verdon	Jane	Episode: "Life Is a Cabaret"
2019	First Wives Club	Megan	Episode: "Storytelling"
2019	This Is Us	Beth Clarke	Recurring role: 11 Episodes
2020	High Maintenance	Hailey	Episode: "Backflash"
2020–2022	Love, Victor	Mia Brooks	Series regular
2021	American Horror Story: Double Feature	Jamie Howard	Main role: 4 Episodes
2022	Winning Time: The Rise of the Lakers Dynasty	Cindy Day	Main role
2025	Duster	Nina Hayes	Main role
