= Judgment Day (upcoming film) =

American comedy film

- Directed by: Nicholas Stoller
- Written by: Nicholas Stoller
- Produced by: Nicholas Stoller; Will Ferrell; Jessica Elbaum; Alex Brown
- Starring: Will Ferrell; Zac Efron; Regina Hall; Priyanka Chopra Jonas; Michael Peña; Billy Eichner; Jimmy Tatro; Bobby Cannavale; Fortune Feimster; Bill Camp
- Cinematography: John Guleserian
- Production companies: Gloria Sanchez Productions; Stoller Global Solutions
- Distributed by: Amazon MGM Studios
- Country: United States
- Language: English

Judgment Day is an upcoming American comedy film written and directed by Nicholas Stoller and starring Will Ferrell, Zac Efron, Regina Hall, Priyanka Chopra Jonas, Michael Peña, Billy Eichner, Jimmy Tatro, Bobby Cannavale, Fortune Feimster, and Bill Camp.

== Premise ==
A reality television judge is taken hostage on air by a disgruntled man who blames him for his life spiraling into incarceration.

== Cast ==
- Will Ferrell as a reality show judge
- Zac Efron as a man who takes the judge hostage
- Regina Hall
- Jimmy Tatro
- Billy Eichner
- Priyanka Chopra
- Michael Peña
- Bobby Cannavale
- Fortune Feimster
- Bill Camp
- Heidi Gardner
- Rachel Hilson
- Tyler Lofton
- Bobby Ray
- Jason Turner
- Victor Turner
- Rory Scovel
- Colton Dunn
- Hayley Magnus
- Andrew Lopez
- Shane Willis

== Production ==
The film was announced as in pre-production for Amazon MGM Studios in February 2025, with Nicholas Stoller directing from his own script and a cast led by Will Ferrell and Zac Efron. Producers include Stoller with Stoller Global Solutions, and Gloria Sanchez Productions with Ferrell, Jessica Elbaum and Alex Brown. Regina Hall, Jimmy Tatro and Billy Eichner joined the cast in March 2025. Priyanka Chopra, Michael Peña, Bobby Cannavale, Fortune Feimster, Bill Camp, Rachel Hilson, Tyler Lofton, and Rory Scovel joined the cast in April 2025. Colton Dunn, Hayley Magnus, and Andrew Lopez joined the cast in May.

Principal photography began in March 2025, in Atlanta.
