= Oldham Theatre Workshop =

Youth theatre group based in the north west of England

Coordinates: 53.541°N 2.112°W

The Oldham Theatre and Music Workshop is a youth theatre group based in the north west of England.

== Outline ==
Founded by David Johnson in 1968 (58 years ago), the Oldham Theatre Workshop has a purpose-built studio located in its own building off Oldham's Union Street, in company with a gallery, a museum and a library.

The workshop provides all-year-round drama training to young people, with classes ranging from the playful and fun 6–8-year-olds, to challenging, devising and practitioner study for those aged 16–25. Each year the workshop produces two large-scale productions — one in December, one in June — which were often staged at the historic Oldham Coliseum Theatre until its closure.

The Oldham Theatre Workshop is now managed by the Education and Cultural Services Department of Oldham, in Greater Manchester, England.

== Former members ==
Many well-known actors began and developed their interest in the performing arts at the Theatre Workshop, with previous members including:

- Dawn Acton
- Natalie Casey
- Nicholas Connor
- Olivia Cooke
- Antony Cotton
- Anthony Crank
- Sally Dynevor
- Jane Danson
- Sue Devaney
- Jason Done
- Kelvin Fletcher
- Thomas Flynn
- Anna Friel
- Elyes Gabel
- Millie Gibson
- Roxy Shahidi
- Joseph Gilgun
- Michelle Holmes
- Suranne Jones
- Mark Jordon
- Anne Kirkbride
- Andrew Knott
- Sarah Lancashire
- Kirsty-Leigh Porter
- Ashley Margolis
- Lisa Riley
- Matt Roper
- Danny Seward
- Cat Simmons
- Nicola Stephenson
- Marsha Thomason
- Michael Le Vell

== References and notes ==
- Hayward, Anthony (1994). Who's Who on Television. London: Boxtree. ISBN 1 85283 936 8.
