= Go Fug Yourself =

Comedy blog

Go Fug Yourself is a comedy blog devoted to fashion gossip.

== Creators ==
The authors and owners of the blog are writers Jessica Morgan and Heather Cocks, who met when they were working as recappers for the website Television Without Pity, then known as Mighty Big TV. Morgan and Cocks initially created the site as a diversion for themselves and their friends, but it quickly became popular and well known.

== Fug Madness ==
Each March, in an homage to the NCAA "March Madness" basketball tournament, Morgan and Cocks present a tournament featuring those celebrities deemed to have made the worst fashion faux pas in the previous calendar year. Each match-up is presented as a poll in which readers can vote on which celebrity has made "fuglier" fashion choices. The inaugural 2008 tournament was won by Bai Ling, who defeated Victoria Beckham in the final match. Subsequent winners have included Aubrey O'Day (2009), Amber Rose (2010), Taylor Momsen (2011), Vanessa Hudgens (2012), Justin Bieber (2013), Miley Cyrus (2014), Kim Kardashian (2015, 2016), Keke Palmer (2017), Bella Thorne (2018), Rita Ora (2019), and Dascha Polanco (2020).

== The Fug Awards ==
Morgan and Cocks co-authored The Fug Awards, which features a number of "honors" offered to the worst offenders in celebrity fashion, along with commentary similar to that found on the site. The book was released on February 6, 2008.

== Media ==
Go Fug Yourself was named one of Entertainment Weekly's 25 favorite entertainment sites in its June 23, 2006, issue. In 2005 it was named one of the 50 Coolest Websites by Time magazine and one of the Top 100 Best Things of the Year by CBC. It was named one of the 50 Most Powerful Blogs by The Guardian in March 2008. It has also been mentioned in Vanity Fair, Elle, Business Week, Harper's Bazaar, the Chicago Tribune, and Newsweek, among others. The authors also blogged regularly as "The Fug Girls" in New York, and regularly contribute to Cosmopolitan. The Fug Girls also appeared on Season Three, Episode Five of All on the Line, a Sundance channel series, offering feedback to struggling fashion designer Brooke Rodd.
