= Red, White & Royal Blue =

2019 novel by Casey McQuiston

- First edition cover
- Author: Casey McQuiston
- Cover artist: Colleen Reinhart
- Language: English
- Genre: LGBT; romantic comedy
- Publisher: St. Martin's Griffin
- Publication date: May 14, 2019
- Publication place: United States
- Media type: Print (hardback, paperback)
- Pages: 421
- ISBN: 978-1-2503-1677-6

Red, White & Royal Blue is an LGBT romance novel by American author Casey McQuiston, originally published on May 14, 2019, by St. Martin's Griffin. It centers on the character of Alex Claremont-Diaz, the first son of the United States, and his romantic relationship with Prince Henry George Edward James Fox-Mountchristen-Windsor, a British prince. Upon release, the novel received positive reviews with praise given to the representation of a queer male relationship. The film adaptation was released on August 11, 2023.

== Background ==
McQuiston first came up with the idea for what would become Red, White & Royal Blue during the 2016 U.S. presidential election. While watching a season of the HBO comedy series Veep and reading a Hillary Clinton biography by Carl Bernstein, A Woman in Charge, and The Royal We by Heather Cocks and Jessica Morgan, McQuiston became intrigued by the extravagant, high-profile lifestyle of the royals and wanted to take on a story featuring a royal family.

== Plot summary ==
Alex Claremont-Diaz is the son of Ellen Claremont, a Democratic politician and the first female President of the United States, who is running for re-election in 2020. Alex, alongside his sister June and their friend Nora (granddaughter of the Vice President), attend a wedding of a member of the British royal family. Alex has always despised Prince Henry, the younger brother of the groom, and after a confrontation at the wedding reception in Buckingham Palace, the two end up in a physical altercation which culminates in them both falling into and destroying the wedding cake.

The incident is photographed and highly publicised, and Alex and Henry are forced to pretend to be friends with each other to prevent a full-blown diplomatic and media crisis that would distract from Alex's mother's re-election bid. While the effort is initially to control the damage, during the diplomatic visit the two young men become friends, apologise to each other and exchange numbers. Over time, the two become close and Henry is later invited to an annual New Year's Eve party at the White House, where Henry kisses Alex. Henry comes out as gay and Alex realizes he is bisexual. They begin a secret "friends with benefits" relationship and begin writing flirtatious emails while simultaneously building a close bond with each other. Alex eventually begins to develop feelings for Henry.

Alex turns to his mentor and friend, Senator Rafael Luna for help, only to find that he is the running mate for Ellen's opponent, the Republican Jeffrey Richards. He eventually comes out to his mother, who is supportive but reminds him that he needs to make sure the relationship is real and not just a fleeting moment. Henry begins ghosting Alex and after Alex confronts him, Henry lets him know that because of the royal family, they would not be able to have a proper relationship. He gives Alex his signet ring, continuing their secret relationship.

Their relationship becomes public when their emails and photos are leaked to the press. They are forced to stay away from each other while Ellen's team handles the situation. Alex flies to England and supports Henry as he comes out to his family, including his grandmother, the Queen, who argues that the world will never accept them for who they are. As this happens, a growing number of people gather around the palace to express support for both Henry and Alex. Nora eventually finds out, with the help of Luna, that it was Richards' campaign that leaked the emails and photographs. After confronting Luna, he tells Alex he switched sides to expose Richards as a sexual predator. Ellen wins the election and Henry joins Alex onstage as an official couple.

== Characters ==
=== Main characters ===
- Alex Claremont-Diaz is the first son of the United States and the brother of June Claremont-Diaz. The book is written from his perspective.
- Prince Henry Fox-Mountchristen-Windsor is a British prince and fourth in line to the British throne.
- June Claremont-Diaz is the first daughter of the United States and the older sister of Alex Claremont-Diaz.
- Ellen Claremont is the first female president of the United States. A Democrat from Texas, she is the mother of Alex and June Claremont-Diaz and the ex-wife of Oscar Diaz.
- Zahra Bankston is the deputy chief of staff for Ellen Claremont and the fiancée of Shaan.
- Nora Holleran is the granddaughter of Vice President Mike Holleran. Along with Alex and June Claremont-Diaz, she makes up the 'White House Trio'.
- Percy "Pez" Okonjo is the best friend of Prince Henry. He is the founder of several charities and non-profit organizations.
- Princess Beatrice Fox-Mountchristen-Windsor is the elder sister of Prince Henry and younger sister of Prince Philip. She is a recovering cocaine addict, an addiction which she developed after her father's death. She is third in line to the British throne.

=== Minor characters ===
- Amy Chen is a trans Secret Service agent and security detail to the first family.
- Cassius (also referred to as 'Cash') is another security detail to the first family. He is pansexual.
- Oscar Diaz is a U.S. senator from California, the father of Alex and June Claremont-Diaz, and the ex-husband of Ellen Claremont.
- Mike Holleran is Ellen Claremont's vice president. He is the grandfather of Nora Holleran.
- Rafael Luna is a young independent U.S. senator from Colorado. He is Latino and openly gay. Alex Claremont-Diaz worked on Luna's campaign and the two are close friends.
- Jeffrey Richards is the far-right Republican nominated to face Ellen Claremont in the 2020 presidential election.
- Shaan Shrivastava is an equerry to Prince Henry. During the course of the book he gets engaged to Zahra Bankston.
- Prince Philip Fox-Mountchristen-Windsor is the elder brother of Prince Henry and Princess Beatrice and the second in line to the British Throne.
- Princess Catherine Fox-Mountchristen-Windsor is the mother of Prince Philip, Prince Henry and Princess Beatrice. She is the heiress apparent to the British throne.
- Queen Mary is the British monarch, mother of Princess Catherine, and grandmother of Prince Philip, Prince Henry and Princess Beatrice.

== Reception ==
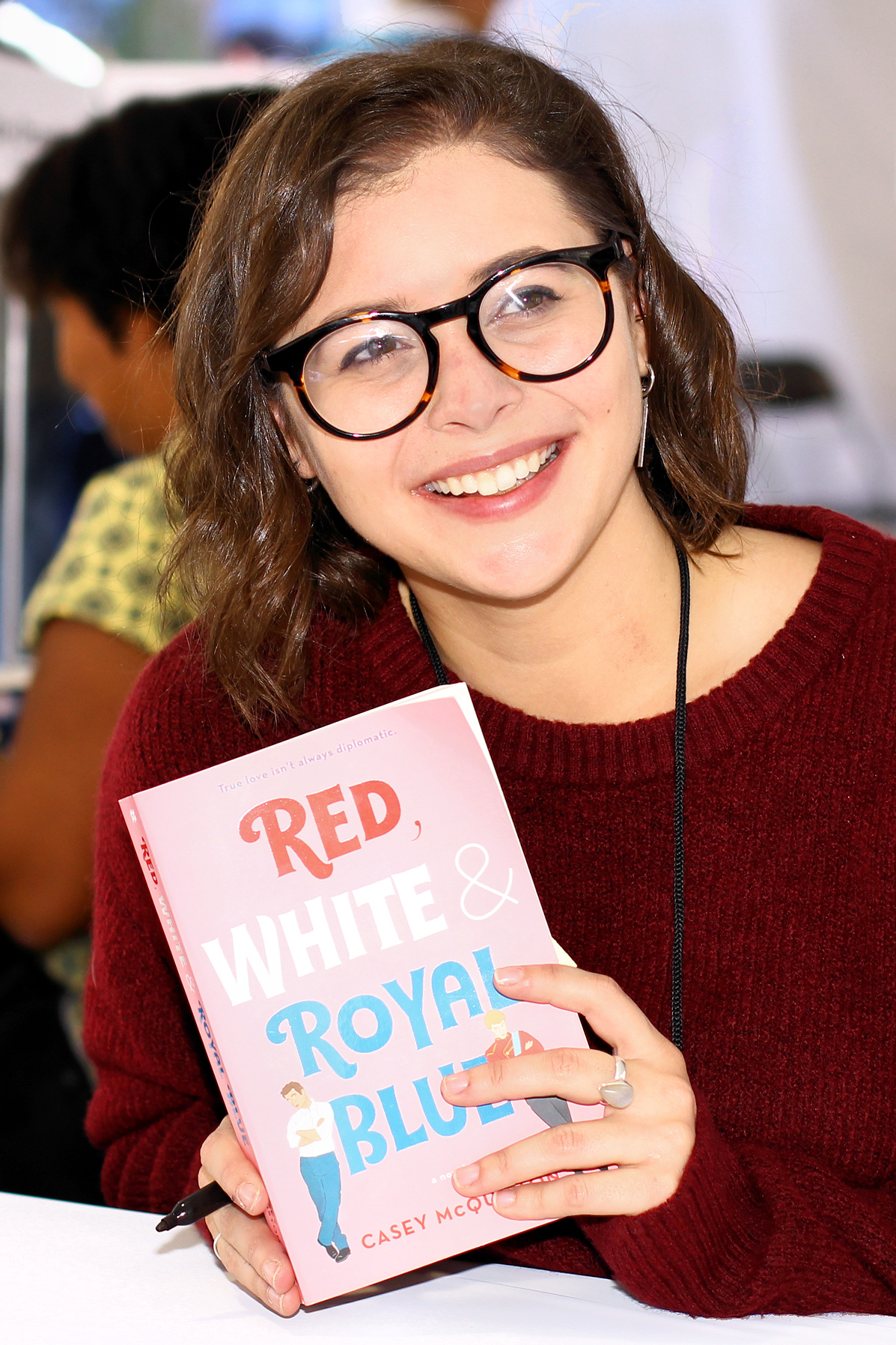
Author Casey McQuiston holding a copy of the original novel

The novel received generally positive reviews, especially for its representation of a gay relationship. Kirkus Reviews said that "McQuiston's strength is in dialogue" and their "rich, well-drawn characters" and Publishers Weekly called Red, White & Royal Blue an "extremely promising start". The Nerd Daily said the novel was "an absolute gem" and praised McQuiston's "exquisite care" in creating their characters, awarding it a ten out of ten. The Hoya also reviewed the novel positively, noting its "distinctive millennial humor" and the "spectacular supporting characters". It was noted, however, that the plot was not necessarily realistic.

The novel was included in the New York Times Bestseller list in June 2019. McQuiston said they were "blown away" by the response to the novel and have discussed the potential for a sequel. Red, White & Royal Blue won a 2020 Alex Award and the 2019 Goodreads Choice Awards for Best Romance and Best Debut. It was one of New York Public Library's Best Books of 2019.

The 2021 Swedish Netflix television series Young Royals was compared to Red, White & Royal Blue due to the similarity of some of the plot points.

In August 2023, the novel was added to the Library of Congress LGBTQ+ collection for preservation in the library. In a December 2023 interview with Forbes, McQuiston reflected on the possibility of a sequel, saying "I would love to see more too. I think that's all I can say about that".

The LA Review of Books considered McQuiston's story a work of literary activism, addressing topics such as heteronormativity and the concealment of identity. The review believes putting the romantic escapade on a national stage was a choice by McQuiston that emphasized the normalization of queer relationships. Furthermore, the review found McQuiston's approach to the concept of "coming out" both challenging and applicable to queer people, offering a more precise interpretation. Additionally, the review noted that readers of "Red, White and Royal Blue" felt the book was a way to assimilate queer relationships into the cliché of "cheesy" romance novels. Queer readers examined McQuiston's work as a form of protest that highlighted queer people as a community capable of experiencing both frivolous and heart-wrenching love stories.

Despite positive reviews in the LA Review of Books, Red, White, and Royal Blue also received a hostile review in National Public Radio's Pop Culture Happy Hour. They found the book to be a "queer romance for straight people," and identified the book as catering to a heterosexual audience despite the book falling under queer literature. Furthermore, reviewers at Pop Culture Happy Hour found the book to be steering away from the simplicity of queer romance and towards the politicalization of LGBTQ relationships.

== Collector's edition ==
On October 11, 2022, a collector's edition was released with an alternate cover and a new chapter written from Henry's perspective. Multiple references to the Harry Potter series were removed from newer editions of the novel, which The Mary Sue writer Alyssa Shotwell wrote was "likely due to the quadrupling down on transphobic activism by author J.K. Rowling". A line in the story regarding the conflict in Israel was also changed.

=== Extended plot ===
In the bonus chapter of the collector's edition, it is revealed that in the years following the book, Alex and Henry are still living happily together with Alex pursuing a law degree and Henry continuing his prior work as a philanthropist and pre‑emptively abdicating his place in the British line of succession. The two also plan a small, private wedding.

== Film adaptation ==
In April 2019, it was reported that Amazon Studios had outbid rivals to secure the film rights of Red, White & Royal Blue, which would be produced by Berlanti Productions. In October 2021, it was announced that playwright and screenwriter Matthew Lopez would direct the film. In June 2022, Taylor Zakhar Perez and Nicholas Galitzine were announced as the film's leads, playing Alex and Prince Henry respectively. Uma Thurman was confirmed to play Ellen Claremont. The lead actors confirmed on Instagram that filming had wrapped by August 2022.

The film was released through Amazon Prime Video on August 11, 2023. Amazon reported that the film became the number one movie globally and one of Prime's top three most-watched romantic comedies.

In the film adaptation, directed by Matthew Lopez, the film grapples with the constriction and expression of queer identity through its characters. Director Lopez points out that the film's main characters, Alex and Henry, each face the challenge of their queer identities not being "in step" with their lives as important public figures.

== Manga adaptation ==
On November 23, 2025, Futami Shobo Publishing announced a manga adaptation of the novel by Fuki Mamori. The manga launched on the boys' love platform La Roseraie on December 20, and on online bookstores on December 23.
