= Casey McQuiston =

American romance author

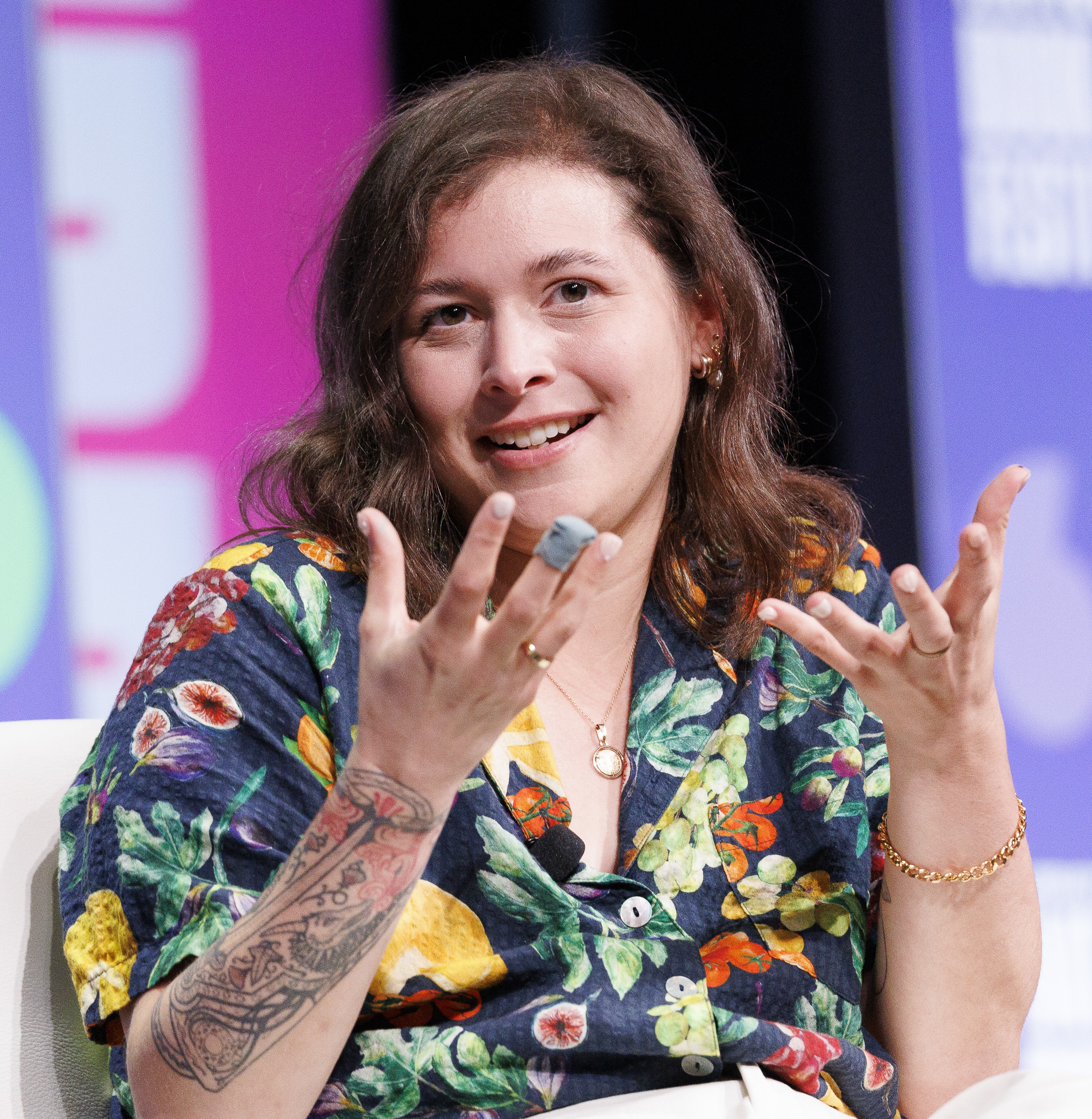
- McQuiston in 2024
- Born: January 21, 1991 (age 35); Baton Rouge, Louisiana, U.S.
- Education: Louisiana State University (BA)
- Writing career
- Years active: 2019–present
- Genre: Romance
- Notable work: Red, White & Royal Blue

Casey McQuiston (born January 21, 1991) is an American author of romance novels in the new adult fiction genre, best known for their (Note: McQuiston uses they/them pronouns.) New York Times best-selling debut novel Red, White & Royal Blue, in which the son of America's first female president falls in love with a prince of England, and the sapphic book One Last Stop. McQuiston made their debut in the young adult fiction genre with their book I Kissed Shara Wheeler which was released on May 3, 2022. They were included in Time magazine's 2022 Time 100 Next list.

== Personal life ==
McQuiston was born on January 21, 1991 and grew up in Baton Rouge, Louisiana.

They attended Louisiana State University and received a degree in journalism. Prior to publishing their first book, they waited tables, freelanced, and worked extensively in magazine publishing. McQuiston previously lived in Fort Collins, Colorado and currently lives in New York City.

McQuiston is queer, non-binary, and uses they/them pronouns. However, some reference books and critical reports list them by their originally assigned pronouns she/her. McQuiston has expressed that they write romantic comedies about queer people because they grew up attending a conservative evangelical Christian school, and they want to write books that would have made them feel less isolated as a queer teenager.

McQuiston has spoken about how ADHD affects their writing, describing the process as "impulse-driven" with scenes often written nonlinearly. After their father's death in 2014 and mental health problems in 2015, McQuiston turned to writing as a way to cope.

== Career ==
McQuiston is currently represented by Sara Megibow at KT Literary. Additionally, they were a 2020 recipient of the Alex Awards for their debut book Red, White & Royal Blue. In November 2023, McQuiston told Out that queer fiction was a "formative experience" for them, allowing them to engage with queerness safely, as a young person and that much of work as an author is "about taking care of that conduit and preserving it" for young queer people "who need it the way I did."

=== Red, White & Royal Blue ===
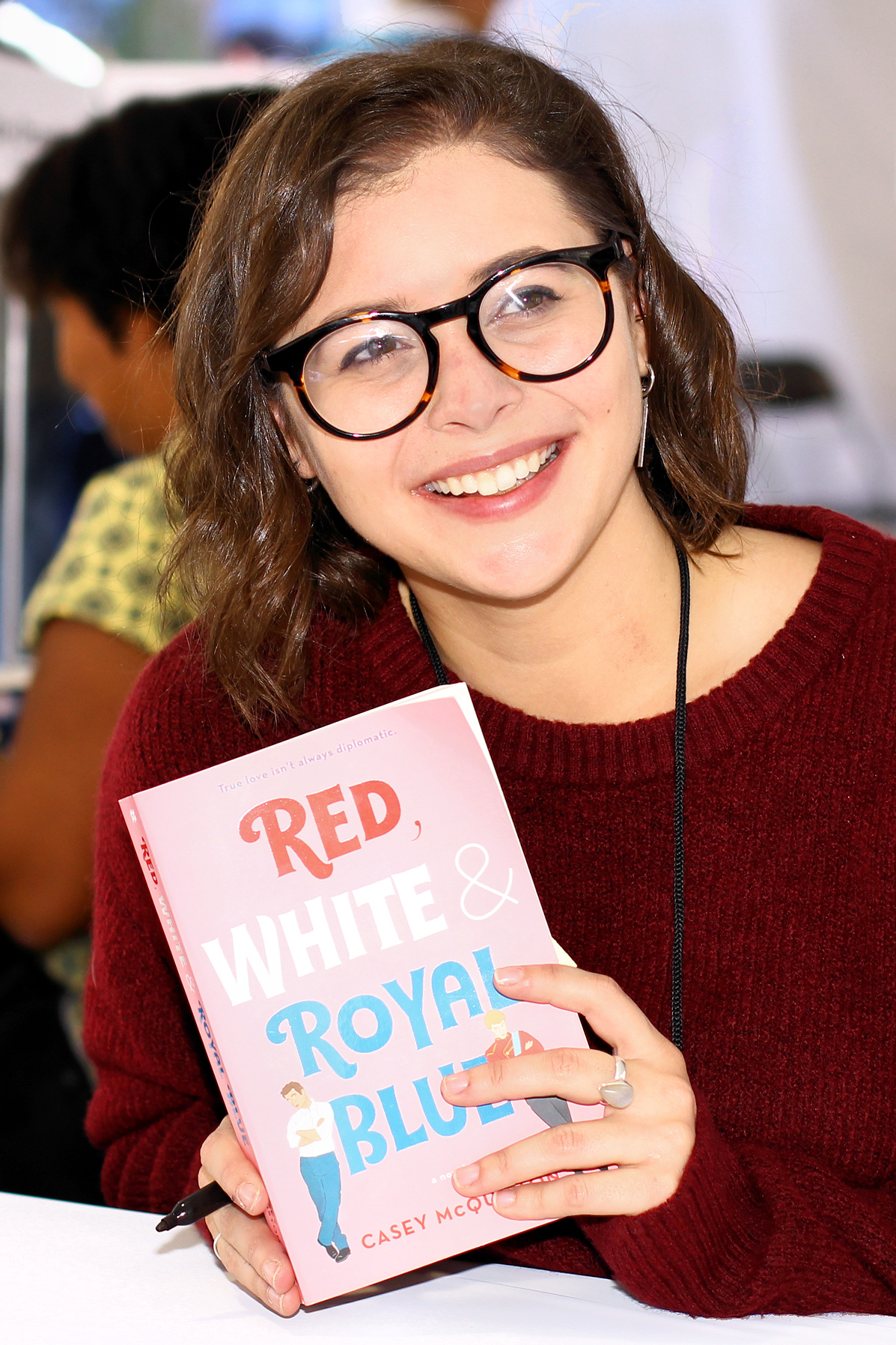
McQuiston at a book signing in Austin, Texas.

Red, White & Royal Blue is a contemporary queer romance that follows Alex Claremont-Diaz, a fictional First Son of the U.S., as he develops romantic feelings for Henry, an English prince, following an altercation that forces them to fake a friendship for damage control and PR purposes.

McQuiston first came up with the idea for what would become Red, White & Royal Blue in early 2016 as they followed the 2016 American presidential elections. While watching a season of the HBO comedy series Veep and reading both a Hillary Clinton biography by Carl Bernstein, A Woman in Charge: The Life of Hillary Rodham Clinton, and The Royal We by Heather Cocks and Jessica Morgan, McQuiston found themself intrigued by the extravagant, high-profile lifestyle of the royals and wanted to write their own take on a story featuring a royal family. Some additional inspirations behind Red, White & Royal Blue include All the Truth is Out by Matt Bai and Pride and Prejudice by Jane Austen.

McQuiston describes Red, White & Royal Blue as a queer romcom and says that they write queer fiction "for the same reason straight people write straight fiction," meaning that they draw from their own experiences. For protagonist Alex's realization that he's bisexual, they were inspired by their own experience. The character of the fictional American president Ellen Claremont in the novel was inspired by American politician Wendy Davis, whose filibuster McQuiston watched and was deeply moved by in 2013.

As part of their research for Red, White & Royal Blue, McQuiston used websites such as whitehousemuseum.org to study both past and present White House interiors that would be incorporated into the novel.

In April 2019, Amazon Studios acquired the film rights to the novel at auction, with Ted Malawer attached as writer and Greg Berlanti as producer. The movie released on Amazon Prime in August 2023. McQuiston has a cameo in the film as Ellen Claremont's speechwriter.

Red, White & Royal Blue was published by St. Martin's Griffin in May 2019 and debuted on the New York Times Paper Trade Fiction bestseller list, at number 15. It was received favorably by critics, earning a starred review from Publishers Weekly, Kirkus, Booklist, Vogue and Vanity Fair.

It has been published and translated in Argentina, Bolivia, Brazil, Chile, Colombia, Costa Rica, Czech Republic, Dominican Republic, Ecuador, El Salvador, Finland, Germany, Guatemala, Honduras, Hungary, Israel, Mexico, Nicaragua, Panama, Paraguay, Peru, Poland, Portugal, Serbia, Sweden, Puerto Rico, Romania, Russia, Spain, Ukraine, and Uruguay.

Red, White & Royal Blue won the Best Debut Novel and Best Romance Novel categories in the 11th Annual Goodreads Choice Awards, making it the only novel to win in two categories in 2019. It was one of New York Public Library's Best Books of 2019.

In interviews, McQuiston has expressed hopes that Red, White & Royal Blue, along with their future novels, will help push queer romance into the spotlight. When asked about their writing process for this book, McQuiston said they knew from the get-go that they wanted to write a queer romance but did not plan out each character before they began writing. For example, while both Henry and Alex are written as cisgender boys, that was not planned from the beginning. Additionally, many of the characters in Red, White & Royal Blue were inspired by different political ideologies and archetypes instead of real-life people. In interviews about this novel, McQuiston likes to say that "no real royals or first families were harmed in the making of this book".

=== One Last Stop ===
McQuiston's next book, One Last Stop, came out on June 1, 2021. The book is "pitched as a queer Kate & Leopold, in which a 23-year-old realizes her subway crush is displaced from 1970's Brooklyn, and she must do everything in her power to help her - and try not to fall in love with the girl lost in time - before it's too late." McQuiston was inspired to make the setting of this book on a subway because when using this public transportation you get a glimpse of another person's life.

This book follows two young adults who were never supposed to meet as they have a chance encounter because one is lost in time. August, the protagonist, does not believe in love and happily ever afters. She believes that living her life alone is the only way until she meets Jane, the time-traveling love interest, on the subway. The subway quickly becomes August's favourite part of her day and she realizes that she needs to do everything in her power to help return Jane back to her own time before it is too late. McQuiston wanted to explore this story within the romantic comedy genre because they wanted to ensure the characters would get happy endings.

In an interview for Time, McQuiston expressed that they wanted to create a queer story that centered around a queer cast. McQuiston finds it strange that in many narratives there is only one queer character while the rest of the cast of characters is heterosexual and cisgender. McQuiston states "I always thought it was silly and unrealistic, the idea that some straight people have, that it is statistically unlikely for more than one gay person to exist in the story."

One Last Stop has been placed sixth on the Bookpage top ten romance novels of 2021. The book was also nominated for the Goodreads Choice Awards for best romance of 2021 where it placed 3rd.

=== I Kissed Shara Wheeler ===
McQuiston's third book, I Kissed Shara Wheeler, was released on May 3, 2022. The book is their first for the young adult age group and is a rom-com set in a Christian high school in Alabama. The book follows Chloe Green after she moves from SoCal to Willowgrove Christian Academy. Her rivalry for valedictorian with Shara Wheeler leads to a kiss before Shara vanishes. Chloe must team up with Shara's other love interests to find her.

McQuiston wrote the book in the tradition of queer coming of age stories set in southern, oppressive religious settings, in part to deal with their own religious trauma. They describe the book as "the most personal thing" they've "ever written."

I Kissed Shara Wheeler was listed as a Stonewall Honor Book for Children and Young Adult Literature in 2023. This book was also nominated for the Goodreads Choice Awards for Best Young Adult Fiction of 2022 where it placed third.

=== "Bloody, Lovely" ===
On September 20, 2022, McQuiston's short story, "Bloody, Lovely," was featured in a collection of paranormal romance shorts edited by Patrice Caldwell, Eternally Yours. The story follows a young teenager falling in love with the Bloody Mary ghost in their mirror and coming to terms with their queerness.

=== The Pairing ===
On October 12, 2023, McQuiston announced the title for their fourth book, The Pairing. The book was published on August 6, 2024, by St. Martin's Griffin, an imprint of MacMillan. It marked McQuiston's return to adult books after previously publishing the young adult I Kissed Shara Wheeler, and is their third adult novel. The book follows estranged bisexual exes Kit and Theo when they end up on the same European food and wine tour. In an attempt to break the awkwardness, the two agree to a bet on who can sleep with the most people during the trip.

McQuiston told USA Today that part of their goal in writing The Pairing was to depict bisexual characters with a "healthy sex positivity." In their words, "When we try to subvert and take apart tropes, it’s not always enough to just say ‘that’s not true’ [...] Some people who are bi are also very sexual people, very open, and that is as much a part of the experience as being like ‘I’m a bisexual person in a four-year partnership.’”

In 2025, The Pairing was shortlisted for the inaugural New Adult Book Prize.
