= List of Arrow episodes =

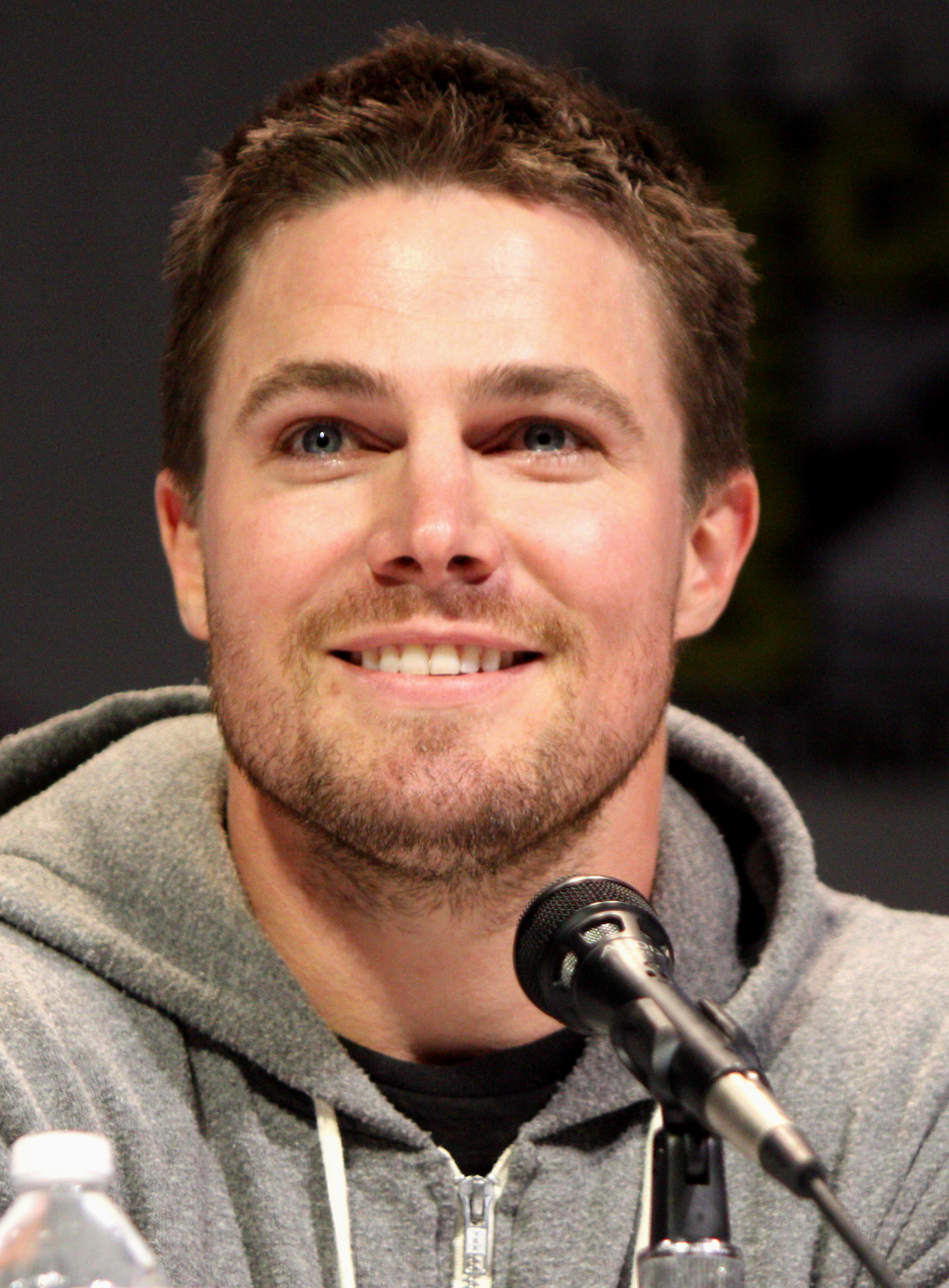
Series lead Stephen Amell speaking at the 2013 WonderCon.

Arrow is an American superhero television series developed by Greg Berlanti, Marc Guggenheim, and Andrew Kreisberg based on the DC Comics character Green Arrow, a costumed crime-fighter created by Mort Weisinger and George Papp, and is set in the Arrowverse, sharing continuity with other related television series. During the course of the series, 170 episodes of Arrow aired over eight seasons, between October 10, 2012, and January 28, 2020.

Arrow follows billionaire playboy Oliver Queen (Stephen Amell), who claimed to have spent five years shipwrecked on Lian Yu, a mysterious island in the North China Sea, before returning home to Starling City (later renamed "Star City") to fight crime and corruption as a secret vigilante whose weapon of choice is a bow and arrow. Throughout the series, Oliver is joined by others in his quest, among them former soldier John Diggle (David Ramsey), I.T. expert and skilled hacker Felicity Smoak (Emily Bett Rickards), former assassin Sara Lance (Caity Lotz), aspiring vigilante Roy Harper (Colton Haynes), Oliver's sister Thea (Willa Holland), and attorney-turned-vigilante Laurel Lance (Katie Cassidy). The group also receives support from Laurel and Sara's father, Detective Quentin Lance (Paul Blackthorne). During the first five seasons of the show, characters from Oliver's past appear in a separate story arc based on Oliver's flashbacks, which highlight parallels from Oliver's history that shape events in the main story. Starting with season seven, a series of flash-forwards focus on Oliver's children William (Ben Lewis) and Mia (Katherine McNamara), exploring how present events would affect their future and Green Arrow's legacy.

The first season aired from October 10, 2012, through May 15, 2013. On February 11, The CW renewed the series for a second season. The season aired on October 9 and concluded on May 14, 2014. On February 12 the series was renewed for another season. The third season began airing on October 8 and concluded on May 13, 2015. Arrow was renewed for a fourth season on January 11. The season began aired on October 7 and ended on May 25, 2016. On March 11, the series was renewed. The fifth season began airing on October 5 and finished on May 24, 2017. The series was renewed for another season on January 8. The sixth season began airing on October 12, 2017, and concluded on May 17, 2018. Arrow was renewed for a seventh season on April 2, 2018. The season aired from October 15 through May 13, 2019. On March 6, 2019, the series was given a final season order. The eight season began on October 15, 2019, and concluded on January 28, 2020.

All eight seasons of the series have also been released on DVD to regions 1, 2 and 4 and on Blu-ray to regions A and B.

== Series overview ==
Arrow series overview
Season	Episodes	Originally released		Rank	Average viewers (in millions)
Season	Episodes	First released	Last released	Rank	Average viewers (in millions)
1	23	October 10, 2012	May 15, 2013	147	3.68
2	23	October 9, 2013	May 14, 2014	181	3.28
3	23	October 8, 2014	May 13, 2015	120	3.52
4	23	October 7, 2015	May 25, 2016	145	2.90
5	23	October 5, 2016	May 24, 2017	128	2.21
6	23	October 12, 2017	May 17, 2018	119	1.76
7	22	October 15, 2018	May 13, 2019	125	1.58
8	10	October 15, 2019	January 28, 2020	172	1.52

== Episodes ==
=== Season 1 (2012–13) ===
The first season of Arrow aired from October 10, 2012, through May 15, 2013.

Arrow, season 1 episodes
No. overall	No. in season	Title	Directed by	Written by	Original release date	Prod. code	U.S. viewers (millions)
1	1	"Pilot"	David Nutter	Story by : Greg Berlanti & Marc Guggenheim; Teleplay by : Andrew Kreisberg & Marc Guggenheim	October 10, 2012	296818	4.14
2	2	"Honor Thy Father"	David Barrett	Story by : Greg Berlanti & Marc Guggenheim; Teleplay by : Andrew Kreisberg & Marc Guggenheim	October 17, 2012	2J7302	3.55
3	3	"Lone Gunmen"	Guy Bee	Story by : Greg Berlanti & Andrew Kreisberg; Teleplay by : Marc Guggenheim & Andrew Kreisberg	October 24, 2012	2J7303	3.51
4	4	"An Innocent Man"	Vince Misiano	Moira Kirland & Lana Cho	October 31, 2012	2J7304	3.05
5	5	"Damaged"	Michael Schultz	Wendy Mericle & Ben Sokolowski	November 7, 2012	2J7305	3.75
6	6	"Legacies"	John Behring	Moira Kirland & Marc Guggenheim	November 14, 2012	2J7306	3.83
7	7	"Muse of Fire"	David Grossman	Story by : Andrew Kreisberg; Teleplay by : Geoff Johns & Marc Guggenheim	November 28, 2012	2J7307	3.74
8	8	"Vendetta"	Ken Fink	Beth Schwartz & Andrew Kreisberg	December 5, 2012	2J7308	3.35
9	9	"Year's End"	John Dahl	Story by : Greg Berlanti & Marc Guggenheim; Teleplay by : Andrew Kreisberg & Marc Guggenheim	December 12, 2012	2J7309	3.11
10	10	"Burned"	Eagle Egilsson	Moira Kirland & Ben Sokolowski	January 16, 2013	2J7310	3.06
11	11	"Trust But Verify"	Nick Copus	Gabrielle Stanton	January 23, 2013	2J7311	3.14
12	12	"Vertigo"	Wendey Stanzler	Wendy Mericle & Ben Sokolowski	January 30, 2013	2J7312	2.97
13	13	"Betrayal"	Guy Bee	Lana Cho & Beth Schwartz	February 6, 2013	2J7313	2.96
14	14	"The Odyssey"	John Behring	Story by : Greg Berlanti & Andrew Kreisberg; Teleplay by : Andrew Kreisberg & Marc Guggenheim	February 13, 2013	2J7314	3.29
15	15	"Dodger"	Eagle Egilsson	Beth Schwartz	February 20, 2013	2J7315	3.15
16	16	"Dead to Rights"	Glen Winter	Geoff Johns	February 27, 2013	2J7316	3.17
17	17	"The Huntress Returns"	Guy Bee	Jake Coburn & Lana Cho	March 20, 2013	2J7317	3.02
18	18	"Salvation"	Nick Copus	Drew Z. Greenberg & Wendy Mericle	March 27, 2013	2J7318	2.65
19	19	"Unfinished Business"	Michael Offer	Bryan Q. Miller & Lindsey Allen	April 3, 2013	2J7319	2.92
20	20	"Home Invasion"	Ken Fink	Ben Sokolowski & Beth Schwartz	April 24, 2013	2J7320	3.10
21	21	"The Undertaking"	Michael Schultz	Jake Coburn & Lana Cho	May 1, 2013	2J7321	2.89
22	22	"Darkness on the Edge of Town"	John Behring	Drew Z. Greenberg & Wendy Mericle	May 8, 2013	2J7322	2.62
23	23	"Sacrifice"	David Barrett	Story by : Greg Berlanti; Teleplay by : Marc Guggenheim & Andrew Kreisberg	May 15, 2013	2J7323	2.77

=== Season 2 (2013–14) ===
The second season aired on October 9, 2013, and concluded on May 14, 2014.

Arrow, season 2 episodes
No. overall	No. in season	Title	Directed by	Written by	Original release date	Prod. code	U.S. viewers (millions)
24	1	"City of Heroes"	John Behring	Story by : Greg Berlanti; Teleplay by : Andrew Kreisberg & Marc Guggenheim	October 9, 2013	2J7451	2.74
25	2	"Identity"	Nick Copus	Ben Sokolowski & Beth Schwartz	October 16, 2013	2J7452	3.06
26	3	"Broken Dolls"	Glen Winter	Marc Guggenheim & Keto Shimizu	October 23, 2013	2J7453	2.89
27	4	"Crucible"	Eagle Egilsson	Andrew Kreisberg & Wendy Mericle	October 30, 2013	2J7454	2.37
28	5	"League of Assassins"	Wendey Stanzler	Jake Coburn & Drew Z. Greenberg	November 6, 2013	2J7455	2.80
29	6	"Keep Your Enemies Closer"	Guy Bee	Ben Sokolowski & Beth Schwartz	November 13, 2013	2J7456	3.09
30	7	"State v. Queen"	Bethany Rooney	Marc Guggenheim & Drew Z. Greenberg	November 20, 2013	2J7457	2.66
31	8	"The Scientist"	Michael Schultz	Story by : Greg Berlanti & Andrew Kreisberg; Teleplay by : Andrew Kreisberg & Geoff Johns	December 4, 2013	2J7458	3.24
32	9	"Three Ghosts"	John Behring	Story by : Greg Berlanti & Andrew Kreisberg; Teleplay by : Geoff Johns & Ben Sokolowski	December 11, 2013	2J7459	3.02
33	10	"Blast Radius"	Rob Hardy	Jake Coburn & Keto Shimizu	January 15, 2014	2J7460	2.52
34	11	"Blind Spot"	Glen Winter	Wendy Mericle & Beth Schwartz	January 22, 2014	2J7461	2.49
35	12	"Tremors"	Guy Bee	Marc Guggenheim & Drew Z. Greenberg	January 29, 2014	2J7462	2.95
36	13	"Heir to the Demon"	Wendey Stanzler	Jake Coburn	February 5, 2014	2J7463	2.86
37	14	"Time of Death"	Nick Copus	Wendy Mericle & Beth Schwartz	February 26, 2014	2J7464	2.45
38	15	"The Promise"	Glen Winter	Jake Coburn & Ben Sokolowski	March 5, 2014	2J7465	2.21
39	16	"Suicide Squad"	Larry Teng	Keto Shimizu & Bryan Q. Miller	March 19, 2014	2J7466	2.42
40	17	"Birds of Prey"	John Behring	Mark Bemesderfer & A. C. Bradley	March 26, 2014	2J7467	2.62
41	18	"Deathstroke"	Guy Bee	Marc Guggenheim & Drew Z. Greenberg	April 2, 2014	2J7468	2.32
42	19	"The Man Under the Hood"	Jesse Warn	Story by : Greg Berlanti & Geoff Johns; Teleplay by : Andrew Kreisberg & Keto Shimizu	April 16, 2014	2J7469	2.26
43	20	"Seeing Red"	Doug Aarniokoski	Wendy Mericle & Beth Schwartz	April 23, 2014	2J7470	2.19
44	21	"City of Blood"	Michael Schultz	Holly Harold	April 30, 2014	2J7471	2.31
45	22	"Streets of Fire"	Nick Copus	Jake Coburn & Ben Sokolowski	May 7, 2014	2J7472	2.33
46	23	"Unthinkable"	John Behring	Story by : Greg Berlanti; Teleplay by : Marc Guggenheim & Andrew Kreisberg	May 14, 2014	2J7473	2.37

=== Season 3 (2014–15) ===
The third season began airing on October 8 and concluded on May 13, 2015.

Arrow, season 3 episodes
No. overall	No. in season	Title	Directed by	Written by	Original release date	Prod. code	U.S. viewers (millions)
47	1	"The Calm"	Glen Winter	Story by : Greg Berlanti & Andrew Kreisberg; Teleplay by : Marc Guggenheim & Jake Coburn	October 8, 2014	3J5151	2.83
48	2	"Sara"	Wendey Stanzler	Jake Coburn & Keto Shimizu	October 15, 2014	3J5152	2.32
49	3	"Corto Maltese"	Stephen Surjik	Erik Oleson & Beth Schwartz	October 22, 2014	3J5153	2.55
50	4	"The Magician"	John Behring	Marc Guggenheim & Wendy Mericle	October 29, 2014	3J5154	2.49
51	5	"The Secret Origin of Felicity Smoak"	Michael Schultz	Ben Sokolowski & Brian Ford Sullivan	November 5, 2014	3J5155	2.73
52	6	"Guilty"	Peter Leto	Erik Oleson & Keto Shimizu	November 12, 2014	3J5156	2.60
53	7	"Draw Back Your Bow"	Rob Hardy	Wendy Mericle & Beth Schwartz	November 19, 2014	3J5157	2.64
54	8	"The Brave and the Bold"	Jesse Warn	Story by : Greg Berlanti & Andrew Kreisberg; Teleplay by : Marc Guggenheim & Grainne Godfree	December 3, 2014	3J5158	3.92
55	9	"The Climb"	Thor Freudenthal	Jake Coburn & Keto Shimizu	December 10, 2014	3J5159	3.06
56	10	"Left Behind"	Glen Winter	Marc Guggenheim & Erik Oleson	January 21, 2015	3J5160	3.06
57	11	"Midnight City"	Nick Copus	Wendy Mericle & Ben Sokolowski	January 28, 2015	3J5161	2.91
58	12	"Uprising"	Jesse Warn	Beth Schwartz & Brian Ford Sullivan	February 4, 2015	3J5162	2.94
59	13	"Canaries"	Michael Schultz	Jake Coburn & Emilio Ortega Aldrich	February 11, 2015	3J5163	2.67
60	14	"The Return"	Dermott Downs	Marc Guggenheim & Erik Oleson	February 18, 2015	3J5164	2.91
61	15	"Nanda Parbat"	Gregory Smith	Story by : Wendy Mericle & Ben Sokolowski; Teleplay by : Erik Oleson & Ben Sokolowski	February 25, 2015	3J5165	3.07
62	16	"The Offer"	Dermott Downs	Beth Schwartz & Brian Ford Sullivan	March 18, 2015	3J5166	2.56
63	17	"Suicidal Tendencies"	Jesse Warn	Keto Shimizu	March 25, 2015	3J5167	2.86
64	18	"Public Enemy"	Dwight Little	Marc Guggenheim & Wendy Mericle	April 1, 2015	3J5168	2.48
65	19	"Broken Arrow"	Doug Aarniokoski	Story by : Jake Coburn; Teleplay by : Ben Sokolowski & Brian Ford Sullivan	April 15, 2015	3J5169	2.47
66	20	"The Fallen"	Antonio Negret	Wendy Mericle & Oscar Balderrama	April 22, 2015	3J5170	2.72
67	21	"Al Sah-him"	Thor Freudenthal	Story by : Beth Schwartz; Teleplay by : Brian Ford Sullivan & Emilio Ortega Aldrich	April 29, 2015	3J5171	2.39
68	22	"This Is Your Sword"	Wendey Stanzler	Story by : Erik Oleson; Teleplay by : Ben Sokolowski & Brian Ford Sullivan	May 6, 2015	3J5172	2.54
69	23	"My Name Is Oliver Queen"	John Behring	Story by : Greg Berlanti & Andrew Kreisberg; Teleplay by : Marc Guggenheim & Jake Coburn	May 13, 2015	3J5173	2.83

=== Season 4 (2015–16) ===
The fourth season began aired on October 7, 2015, and ended on May 25, 2016.

Arrow, season 4 episodes
No. overall	No. in season	Title	Directed by	Written by	Original release date	Prod. code	U.S. viewers (millions)
70	1	"Green Arrow"	Thor Freudenthal	Story by : Greg Berlanti & Beth Schwartz; Teleplay by : Marc Guggenheim & Wendy Mericle	October 7, 2015	3J5801	2.67
71	2	"The Candidate"	John Behring	Marc Guggenheim & Keto Shimizu	October 14, 2015	3J5802	2.50
72	3	"Restoration"	Wendey Stanzler	Wendy Mericle & Speed Weed	October 21, 2015	3J5803	2.40
73	4	"Beyond Redemption"	Lexi Alexander	Beth Schwartz & Ben Sokolowski	October 28, 2015	3J5805	2.64
74	5	"Haunted"	John Badham	Brian Ford Sullivan & Oscar Balderrama	November 4, 2015	3J5804	2.60
75	6	"Lost Souls"	Antonio Negret	Beth Schwartz & Emilio Ortega Aldrich	November 11, 2015	3J5806	2.30
76	7	"Brotherhood"	James Bamford	Speed Weed & Keto Shimizu	November 18, 2015	3J5807	2.69
77	8	"Legends of Yesterday"	Thor Freudenthal	Story by : Greg Berlanti & Marc Guggenheim; Teleplay by : Brian Ford Sullivan & Marc Guggenheim	December 2, 2015	3J5808	3.66
78	9	"Dark Waters"	John Behring	Wendy Mericle & Ben Sokolowski	December 9, 2015	3J5809	2.82
79	10	"Blood Debts"	Jesse Warn	Oscar Balderrama & Sarah Tarkoff	January 20, 2016	3J5810	2.83
80	11	"A.W.O.L."	Charlotte Brandström	Brian Ford Sullivan & Emilio Ortega Aldrich	January 27, 2016	3J5811	2.78
81	12	"Unchained"	Kevin Fair	Speed Weed & Beth Schwartz	February 3, 2016	3J5812	2.48
82	13	"Sins of the Father"	Gordon Verheul	Ben Sokolowski & Keto Shimizu	February 10, 2016	3J5813	2.44
83	14	"Code of Silence"	James Bamford	Wendy Mericle & Oscar Balderrama	February 17, 2016	3J5814	2.44
84	15	"Taken"	Gregory Smith	Story by : Marc Guggenheim; Teleplay by : Keto Shimizu & Brian Ford Sullivan	February 24, 2016	3J5815	2.70
85	16	"Broken Hearts"	John Showalter	Rebecca Bellotto & Nolan Dunbar	March 23, 2016	3J5816	2.09
86	17	"Beacon of Hope"	Michael Schultz	Ben Sokolowski & Brian Ford Sullivan	March 30, 2016	3J5817	2.34
87	18	"Eleven-Fifty-Nine"	Rob Hardy	Marc Guggenheim & Keto Shimizu	April 6, 2016	3J5818	2.24
88	19	"Canary Cry"	Laura Belsey	Wendy Mericle & Beth Schwartz	April 27, 2016	3J5819	2.27
89	20	"Genesis"	Gregory Smith	Oscar Balderrama & Emilio Ortega Aldrich	May 4, 2016	3J5820	2.07
90	21	"Monument Point"	Kevin Tancharoen	Speed Weed & Jenny Lynn	May 11, 2016	3J5821	2.16
91	22	"Lost in the Flood"	Glen Winter	Brian Ford Sullivan & Oscar Balderrama	May 18, 2016	3J5822	1.94
92	23	"Schism"	John Behring	Story by : Greg Berlanti; Teleplay by : Wendy Mericle & Marc Guggenheim	May 25, 2016	3J5823	2.19

=== Season 5 (2016–17) ===
The fifth season began airing on October 5, 2016, and finished on May 24, 2017.

Arrow season 5 episodes
No. overall	No. in season	Title	Directed by	Written by	Original release date	Prod. code	U.S. viewers (millions)
93	1	"Legacy"	James Bamford	Story by : Greg Berlanti; Teleplay by : Marc Guggenheim & Wendy Mericle	October 5, 2016	T27.13201	1.87
94	2	"The Recruits"	James Bamford	Speed Weed & Beth Schwartz	October 12, 2016	T27.13202	1.94
95	3	"A Matter of Trust"	Gregory Smith	Ben Sokolowski & Emilio Ortega Aldrich	October 19, 2016	T27.13203	1.79
96	4	"Penance"	Dermott Downs	Brian Ford Sullivan & Oscar Balderrama	October 26, 2016	T27.13204	1.87
97	5	"Human Target"	Laura Belsey	Oscar Balderrama & Sarah Tarkoff	November 2, 2016	T27.13205	1.61
98	6	"So It Begins"	John Behring	Wendy Mericle & Brian Ford Sullivan	November 9, 2016	T27.13206	1.95
99	7	"Vigilante"	Gordon Verheul	Ben Sokolowski & Emilio Ortega Aldrich	November 16, 2016	T27.13207	1.86
100	8	"Invasion!"	James Bamford	Story by : Greg Berlanti; Teleplay by : Marc Guggenheim & Wendy Mericle	November 30, 2016	T27.13208	3.55
101	9	"What We Leave Behind"	Antonio Negret	Wendy Mericle & Beth Schwartz	December 7, 2016	T27.13209	1.94
102	10	"Who Are You?"	Gregory Smith	Ben Sokolowski & Brian Ford Sullivan	January 25, 2017	T27.13210	1.68
103	11	"Second Chances"	Mark Bunting	Speed Weed & Sarah Tarkoff	February 1, 2017	T27.13211	1.91
104	12	"Bratva"	Ben Bray	Oscar Balderrama & Emilio Ortega Aldrich	February 8, 2017	T27.13212	1.61
105	13	"Spectre of the Gun"	Kristin Windell	Marc Guggenheim	February 15, 2017	T27.13213	1.66
106	14	"The Sin-Eater"	Mary Lambert	Barbara Bloom & Jenny Lynn	February 22, 2017	T27.13214	1.54
107	15	"Fighting Fire with Fire"	Michael Schultz	Speed Weed & Ben Sokolowski	March 1, 2017	T27.13215	1.60
108	16	"Checkmate"	Ken Shane	Beth Schwartz & Sarah Tarkoff	March 15, 2017	T27.13216	1.53
109	17	"Kapiushon"	Kevin Tancharoen	Brian Ford Sullivan & Emilio Ortega Aldrich	March 22, 2017	T27.13217	1.38
110	18	"Disbanded"	JJ Makaro	Rebecca Bellotto	March 29, 2017	T27.13218	1.55
111	19	"Dangerous Liaisons"	Joel Novoa	Speed Weed & Elizabeth Kim	April 26, 2017	T27.13219	1.36
112	20	"Underneath"	Wendey Stanzler	Wendy Mericle & Beth Schwartz	May 3, 2017	T27.13220	1.36
113	21	"Honor Thy Fathers"	Laura Belsey	Marc Guggenheim & Sarah Tarkoff	May 10, 2017	T27.13221	1.65
114	22	"Missing"	Mairzee Almas	Speed Weed & Oscar Balderrama	May 17, 2017	T27.13222	1.44
115	23	"Lian Yu"	Jesse Warn	Wendy Mericle & Marc Guggenheim	May 24, 2017	T27.13223	1.72

=== Season 6 (2017–18) ===
The sixth season began airing on October 12, 2017, and concluded on May 17, 2018.

Arrow, season 6 episodes
No. overall	No. in season	Title	Directed by	Written by	Original release date	Prod. code	U.S. viewers (millions)
116	1	"Fallout"	James Bamford	Marc Guggenheim & Wendy Mericle	October 12, 2017	T27.13451	1.52
117	2	"Tribute"	Laura Belsey	Story by : Adam Schwartz; Teleplay by : Marc Guggenheim & Beth Schwartz	October 19, 2017	T27.13452	1.51
118	3	"Next of Kin"	Kevin Tancharoen	Speed Weed & Oscar Balderrama	October 26, 2017	T27.13453	1.34
119	4	"Reversal"	Gregory Smith	Sarah Tarkoff & Emilio Ortega Aldrich	November 2, 2017	T27.13454	1.33
120	5	"Deathstroke Returns"	Joel Novoa	Ben Sokolowski & Spiro Skentzos	November 9, 2017	T27.13455	1.29
121	6	"Promises Kept"	Antonio Negret	Oscar Balderrama & Rebecca Bellotto	November 16, 2017	T27.13456	1.28
122	7	"Thanksgiving"	Gordon Verheul	Wendy Mericle & Speed Weed	November 23, 2017	T27.13457	1.09
123	8	"Crisis on Earth-X, Part 2"	James Bamford	Story by : Marc Guggenheim & Andrew Kreisberg; Teleplay by : Wendy Mericle & Ben Sokolowski	November 27, 2017	T27.13458	2.52
124	9	"Irreconcilable Differences"	Laura Belsey	Beth Schwartz & Sarah Tarkoff	December 7, 2017	T27.13459	1.30
125	10	"Divided"	James Bamford	Ben Sokolowski & Emilio Ortega Aldrich	January 18, 2018	T27.13460	1.38
126	11	"We Fall"	Wendey Stanzler	Speed Weed & Spiro Skentzos	January 25, 2018	T27.13461	1.38
127	12	"All for Nothing"	Mairzee Almas	Beth Schwartz & Oscar Balderrama	February 1, 2018	T27.13462	1.24
128	13	"The Devil's Greatest Trick"	JJ Makaro	Sarah Tarkoff & Emilio Ortega Aldrich	February 8, 2018	T27.13463	1.30
129	14	"Collision Course"	Ken Shane	Oscar Balderrama & Rebecca Bellotto	March 1, 2018	T27.13464	1.11
130	15	"Doppelganger"	Kristin Windell	Story by : Christos Gage & Ruth Fletcher Gage; Teleplay by : Speed Weed	March 8, 2018	T27.13465	1.28
131	16	"The Thanatos Guild"	Joel Novoa	Beth Schwartz & Ben Sokolowski	March 29, 2018	T27.13466	1.12
132	17	"Brothers in Arms"	Mark Bunting	Sarah Tarkoff & Jeane Wong	April 5, 2018	T27.13467	0.87
133	18	"Fundamentals"	Ben Bray	Speed Weed & Emilio Ortega Aldrich	April 12, 2018	T27.13468	1.06
134	19	"The Dragon"	Gordon Verheul	Spiro Skentzos & Elizabeth Kim	April 19, 2018	T27.13469	0.96
135	20	"Shifting Allegiances"	Alexandra La Roche	Wendy Mericle & Rebecca Bellotto	April 26, 2018	T27.13470	0.87
136	21	"Docket No. 11-19-41-73"	Andi Armaganian	Story by : Marc Guggenheim; Teleplay by : Ubah Mohamed & Tyron B. Carter	May 3, 2018	T27.13471	1.10
137	22	"The Ties That Bind"	Tara Miele	Ben Sokolowski & Oscar Balderrama	May 10, 2018	T27.13472	1.00
138	23	"Life Sentence"	James Bamford	Wendy Mericle & Marc Guggenheim	May 17, 2018	T27.13473	1.35

=== Season 7 (2018–19) ===
The seventh season aired from October 15, 2018, through May 13, 2019. It had 22 episode instead of 23 which the previous season had.

Arrow, season 7 episodes
No. overall	No. in season	Title	Directed by	Written by	Original release date	Prod. code	U.S. viewers (millions)
139	1	"Inmate 4587"	James Bamford	Beth Schwartz & Oscar Balderrama	October 15, 2018	T27.13651	1.43
140	2	"The Longbow Hunters"	Laura Belsey	Jill Blankenship & Rebecca Bellotto	October 22, 2018	T27.13652	1.18
141	3	"Crossing Lines"	Gordon Verheul	Story by : Elizabeth Kim; Teleplay by : Onalee Hunter Hughes & Sarah Tarkoff	October 29, 2018	T27.13653	1.15
142	4	"Level Two"	Ben Bray	Emilio Ortega Aldrich & Tonya Kong	November 5, 2018	T27.13654	1.08
143	5	"The Demon"	Mark Bunting	Benjamin Raab & Deric A. Hughes	November 12, 2018	T27.13655	1.26
144	6	"Due Process"	Kristin Windell	Sarah Tarkoff & Tonya Kong	November 19, 2018	T27.13656	1.03
145	7	"The Slabside Redemption"	James Bamford	Jill Blankenship & Rebecca Bellotto	November 26, 2018	T27.13657	1.31
146	8	"Unmasked"	Alexandra La Roche	Oscar Balderrama & Beth Schwartz	December 3, 2018	T27.13658	1.35
147	9	"Elseworlds, Part 2"	James Bamford	Story by : Caroline Dries; Teleplay by : Marc Guggenheim	December 10, 2018	T27.13659	2.06
148	10	"My Name Is Emiko Queen"	Andi Armaganian	Benjamin Raab & Deric A. Hughes	January 21, 2019	T27.13660	1.22
149	11	"Past Sins"	David Ramsey	Onalee Hunter Hughes & Tonya Kong	January 28, 2019	T27.13661	1.18
150	12	"Emerald Archer"	Glen Winter	Marc Guggenheim & Emilio Ortega Aldrich	February 4, 2019	T27.13662	1.07
151	13	"Star City Slayer"	Gregory Smith	Beth Schwartz & Jill Blankenship	February 11, 2019	T27.13663	1.09
152	14	"Brothers & Sisters"	Marcus Stokes	Rebecca Bellotto & Jeane Wong	March 4, 2019	T27.13664	0.89
153	15	"Training Day"	Ruba Nadda	Emilio Ortega Aldrich & Rebecca Rosenberg	March 11, 2019	T27.13665	1.02
154	16	"Star City 2040"	James Bamford	Beth Schwartz & Oscar Balderrama	March 18, 2019	T27.13666	1.00
155	17	"Inheritance"	Patia Prouty	Sarah Tarkoff & Elizabeth Kim	March 25, 2019	T27.13667	1.01
156	18	"Lost Canary"	Kristin Windell	Jill Blankenship & Elisa Delson	April 15, 2019	T27.13668	0.71
157	19	"Spartan"	Avi Youabian	Benjamin Raab & Deric A. Hughes	April 22, 2019	T27.13669	0.71
158	20	"Confessions"	Tara Miele	Onalee Hunter Hughes & Emilio Ortega Aldrich	April 29, 2019	T27.13670	0.64
159	21	"Living Proof"	Gordon Verheul	Oscar Balderrama & Sarah Tarkoff	May 6, 2019	T27.13671	0.63
160	22	"You Have Saved This City"	James Bamford	Beth Schwartz & Rebecca Bellotto	May 13, 2019	T27.13672	0.95

=== Season 8 (2019–20) ===
The eighth and final season of Arrow was ordered on March 6, 2019, with a 10 episode order. The season began on October 15, 2019, and concluded on January 28, 2020.

Arrow, season 8 episodes
No. overall	No. in season	Title	Directed by	Written by	Original release date	Prod. code	U.S. viewers (millions)
161	1	"Starling City"	James Bamford	Beth Schwartz & Marc Guggenheim	October 15, 2019	T27.13951	0.84
162	2	"Welcome to Hong Kong"	Antonio Negret	Jill Blankenship & Sarah Tarkoff	October 22, 2019	T27.13952	0.77
163	3	"Leap of Faith"	Katie Cassidy	Emilio Ortega Aldrich & Elizabeth Kim	October 29, 2019	T27.13953	0.76
164	4	"Present Tense"	Kristin Windell	Oscar Balderrama & Jeane Wong	November 5, 2019	T27.13954	0.62
165	5	"Prochnost"	Laura Belsey	Benjamin Raab & Deric A. Hughes	November 19, 2019	T27.13955	0.74
166	6	"Reset"	David Ramsey	Onalee Hunter Hughes & Maya Houston	November 26, 2019	T27.13956	0.79
167	7	"Purgatory"	James Bamford	Rebecca Bellotto & Rebecca Rosenberg	December 3, 2019	T27.13957	0.83
168	8	"Crisis on Infinite Earths: Part Four"	Glen Winter	Marv Wolfman & Marc Guggenheim	January 14, 2020	T27.13958	1.41
169	9	"Green Arrow & The Canaries" "Livin' in the Future"	Tara Miele	Beth Schwartz & Marc Guggenheim & Jill Blankenship & Oscar Balderrama	January 21, 2020	T27.13959	0.89
170	10	"Fadeout"	James Bamford	Marc Guggenheim & Beth Schwartz	January 28, 2020	T27.13960	0.73

== Specials ==
Arrow television specials
No.	Title	Narrator	Aired between	Original release date	U.S. viewers (millions)
1	"Year One"	John Barrowman	"Sacrifice" (S01E23) "City of Heroes" (S02E01)	October 2, 2013	1.74
2	"Hitting the Bullseye"	TBA	"Green Arrow & The Canaries" (S08E09) "Fadeout" (S08E10)	January 28, 2020	0.63

== Home media ==
Arrow home media releases
Season	DVD release dates			Blu-ray release dates	
Season	Region 1	Region 2	Region 4	Region A	Region B
1	September 17, 2013	September 23, 2013	October 2, 2013	September 17, 2013	September 23, 2013
2	September 16, 2014	September 22, 2014	December 3, 2014	September 16, 2014	September 22, 2014
3	September 22, 2015	September 28, 2015	September 23, 2015	September 22, 2015	September 28, 2015
4	August 30, 2016	September 5, 2016	September 7, 2016	August 30, 2016	September 5, 2016
5	September 19, 2017	September 18, 2017	September 9, 2017	September 19, 2017	September 18, 2017
6	August 14, 2018	September 3, 2018	August 14, 2018	August 14, 2018	September 3, 2018
7	August 20, 2019	September 16, 2019	August 21, 2019	August 20, 2019	September 16, 2019
8	April 28, 2020	May 25, 2020	April 29, 2020	April 28, 2020	May 25, 2020
