= Arrow season 3 =

Arrow
- Season 3
- Region 1 DVD cover
- Showrunner: Marc Guggenheim
- Starring: Stephen Amell; Katie Cassidy; David Ramsey; Willa Holland; Emily Bett Rickards; Colton Haynes; John Barrowman; Paul Blackthorne
- No. of episodes: 23

Release
- Original network: The CW
- Original release: October 8, 2014 – May 13, 2015

Season chronology
- ← Previous; Season 2 Next → Season 4

The third season of the American television series Arrow premiered on The CW on October 8, 2014, and concluded on May 13, 2015, with a total of 23 episodes. The series is based on the DC Comics character Green Arrow, a costumed crime-fighter created by Mort Weisinger and George Papp, and is set in the Arrowverse, sharing continuity with other Arrowverse television series. The showrunners for this season were solely by Marc Guggenheim. Stephen Amell stars as Oliver Queen, with principal cast members Katie Cassidy as Laurel Lance, David Ramsey as John Diggle, Willa Holland as Thea Queen, Emily Bett Rickards as Felicity Smoak, Colton Haynes as Roy Harper, John Barrowman as Malcolm Merlyn and Paul Blackthorne as Quentin Lance also returning from previous seasons.

The series follows billionaire playboy Oliver Queen (Stephen Amell), who claimed to have spent five years shipwrecked on Lian Yu, a mysterious island in the North China Sea, before returning home to Starling City (later renamed "Star City") to fight crime and corruption as a secret vigilante whose weapon of choice is a bow and arrow. In the third season, Oliver's company Queen Consolidated is sold to businessman, scientist, and aspiring hero Ray Palmer (Brandon Routh) who changes the company's name to Palmer Technologies and hires Felicity as vice president. After Sara is found murdered, Oliver becomes embroiled in a conflict with Ra's al Ghul (Matt Nable). He struggles to reconnect with his half-sister Thea who knows Malcolm is her father. Laurel sets out to follow Sara as the Black Canary. Meanwhile, John becomes a father and struggles as a family man. The season features flashbacks to Oliver's third year since he was presumed dead, where after escaping Lian Yu, he is forced to work for A.R.G.U.S. leader Amanda Waller (Cynthia Addai-Robinson) in Hong Kong. Oliver and Tatsu Yamashiro (Rila Fukushima) work to stop corrupt general Matthew Shrieve (Marc Singer) from unleashing a pathogen which Ra's al Ghul acquires in the present.

The series was renewed for its third season on February 12, 2014, and began filming in Vancouver, British Columbia, Canada in that July. Despite a strong critical start for the season premiere, the season received more negative reviews than the previous seasons, and averaged 3.52 million viewers each week. The season would go on to be nominated for eleven nominations in various categories, winning two. This season includes the first annual Arrowverse crossover with spin-off TV series The Flash. The season was released on DVD and Blu-ray on September 22, 2015. The series was renewed for a fourth season in January 2015.

== Episodes ==
Arrow, season 3 episodes
No. overall	No. in season	Title	Directed by	Written by	Original release date	Prod. code	U.S. viewers (millions)
47	1	"The Calm"	Glen Winter	Story by : Greg Berlanti & Andrew Kreisberg; Teleplay by : Marc Guggenheim & Jake Coburn	October 8, 2014	3J5151	2.83
The newly promoted Captain Quentin Lance calls off the task-force hunting the Arrow. Elsewhere, Werner Zytle, who has claimed the mantle of Vertigo, attempts to kill the Arrow in a bid to raise his profile. After losing the first battle, Oliver Queen and Roy Harper are able to stop Zytle with some help from Sara Lance, who is back in town for unknown reasons. Meanwhile, businessman Ray Palmer successfully acquires Queen Consolidated, intending to rebuild the city and rename it "Star City". John Diggle and Lyla Michaels welcome a baby girl, which convinces Diggle to take Oliver's suggestion and retire from field duty. Oliver and Felicity Smoak go on a first date, but Oliver ends it, explaining how he cannot be both the Arrow and Oliver, although he acknowledges loving her. Sara is shot in the chest with arrows by an unseen figure before falling from a rooftop to her death. In flashbacks, Amanda Waller assigns agent Maseo Yamashiro as Oliver's handler. After numerous failed attempts to escape, Oliver agrees to proceed with his training to prevent Waller from murdering Maseo's family as punishment for his failure to restrain Oliver.
48	2	"Sara"	Wendey Stanzler	Jake Coburn & Keto Shimizu	October 15, 2014	3J5152	2.32
Laurel Lance takes Sara's body to the team. Quentin alerts Oliver to another archer in the city killing people, unaware of Sara's death. Oliver follows a lead and is able to identify the archer as Simon Lacroix. The group learns of Lacroix's next target and intercepts him. Laurel arrives, determined to avenge Sara's death. As Oliver attempts to dissuade her, Lacroix confirms that he was not in Starling City at the time of Sara's murder. The team buries Sara and Laurel chooses not to tell Quentin what happened. Diggle returns to field duty again. Meanwhile, Roy reveals to Oliver that Thea left town when she learned he was working with the Arrow. In Corto Maltese, Thea is shown with Malcolm Merlyn and has proven to be capable of defeating more than one henchman in combat. Felicity decides to work for Ray. In flashbacks, Oliver is tasked with killing Tommy Merlyn after he comes to Hong Kong, hoping to track Oliver through activity he saw on Oliver's email account. To save Tommy, Oliver pretends to kidnap him and tricks him into thinking the emails were a ruse to hold him for ransom. Maseo, posing as a police officer, then rescues Tommy.
49	3	"Corto Maltese"	Stephen Surjik	Erik Oleson & Beth Schwartz	October 22, 2014	3J5153	2.55
With no more leads in Sara's murder, Oliver focuses his attention on bringing Thea home. Felicity is able to track her to Corto Maltese. Thea initially refuses to return. While he waits to convince her, Oliver assists Diggle on a mission for A.R.G.U.S. to ascertain the whereabouts of one of its agents, Mark Shaw, who has broken into the A.R.G.U.S. database and stolen information to sell on the black market. Oliver and Diggle manage to stop Shaw, who convinces Diggle to tell Waller that he is dead. After a last minute plea, and Oliver revealing the truth about Robert's death, Thea agrees to return home, which Merlyn allows. Meanwhile, trying to emulate Sara, Laurel attempts to exact vengeance on the abusive boyfriend of a fellow AA member, but she is overpowered and ends up in the hospital. Later, she asks boxer Ted Grant to train her to fight after Oliver's refusal. With Felicity's help, Ray manages to open a file detailing advanced weaponry. Nyssa confronts Oliver and demands Sara's whereabouts. In flashbacks to six months prior, Merlyn begins training Thea to calm her mind and heal her emotional anguish, as well as master control over physical pain.
50	4	"The Magician"	John Behring	Marc Guggenheim & Wendy Mericle	October 29, 2014	3J5154	2.49
Oliver informs Nyssa that Sara is dead; Nyssa reveals that Sara was sent by the League to confirm Merlyn is still alive. After tracking Merlyn, Oliver agrees to meet him in a public location, where Merlyn tells Oliver that he did not kill Sara, having only returned to Starling City for Thea. Nyssa kidnaps Thea in an attempt to draw out Merlyn, known by the League as the "Magician", but Oliver arrives to rescue her. Merlyn arrives shortly after to clear his name and insinuates to Nyssa that it was Ra's who had Sara murdered. Nyssa does not believe him, but Oliver does and vows to protect Merlyn for as long as he is in Starling. Nyssa warns Oliver that he has made a serious enemy of the League before leaving and reporting back to Ra's. Quentin gets worried about Sara's status. In flashbacks, Oliver completes his first assassination and learns that Waller was behind Edward Fyers' actions on Lian Yu, where her intent had been to shoot down Chien Na Wei's flight. But since Oliver stopped the attack, Waller demands he help her find out the reason behind Chien's presence in Hong Kong.
51	5	"The Secret Origin of Felicity Smoak"	Michael Schultz	Ben Sokolowski & Brian Ford Sullivan	November 5, 2014	3J5155	2.73
A cyber terrorist attacks Starling City, threatening to shut down all the banks and set everyone at an even socioeconomic status. While Oliver and Roy attempt to keep peace on the streets, Felicity works to find the virus. She quickly discovers that she designed the unstoppable virus five years earlier. Her mother, Donna, shows up unannounced and the two have a falling out their differences. Felicity soon realizes that Donna was unknowingly sent by the cyber terrorist—revealed to be Felicity's ex-boyfriend Cooper Seldon—who then kidnaps them both. Using Donna as leverage, Cooper forces Felicity to divert a set of armored vehicles, carrying newly minted money, to their location. She secretly uses a smart watch Ray gave Donna to also contact Oliver, who arrives with Roy and Diggle, stopping Cooper and his team. Felicity reconciles with Donna. Roy begins having nightmares that he was the one who killed Sara. Meanwhile, Laurel continues to train with Ted and tells him the real reason that she is learning to fight. Thea buys a house using the money she inherited from Merlyn and convinces Oliver to stay with her.
52	6	"Guilty"	Peter Leto	Erik Oleson & Keto Shimizu	November 12, 2014	3J5156	2.60
In flashbacks, Maseo's wife, Tatsu, uses a type of meditation to help Oliver remember where a dead associate of Chien Na Wei's dropped a letter, hoping that he leaves her family soon. From the letter, the name Li Kuan Hui is extracted. In the present, a murderer begins taking out gang members; when a body shows up in Ted's gym, he becomes a suspect. Ted tells Oliver that he was once a vigilante who retired after a drug dealer was accidentally beaten to death. Ted reveals the killer is his former protégé, Isaac Stanzler, who was also responsible for the death of the dealer; Isaac is bested by Oliver before escaping. Isaac kidnaps Ted and Laurel, but Oliver and his team are able to successfully stop him. Meanwhile, Roy tells Felicity about his dreams and later confesses to Oliver and Laurel. Using the technique learned from Tatsu, Oliver helps Roy access his memories to realize that he did not murder Sara; however, Roy discovers he did kill a cop while under the effects of the Mirakuru. Ted decides to continue training Laurel. Isaac is confronted by a female archer calling herself "Cupid".
53	7	"Draw Back Your Bow"	Rob Hardy	Wendy Mericle & Beth Schwartz	November 19, 2014	3J5157	2.64
Cupid, who was saved by the Arrow during Slade Wilson's Siege attack, murders Isaac and dresses up his body as the Arrow. Following a lead, Oliver learns that she is a former cop named Carrie Cutter who is obsessed with him as a result of her condition. Carrie uses a old confidential informant to track down Oliver's hideout under Verdant, which has been reopened by Thea. Oliver lures Carrie away and rejects her romantic advances right before she tries to off the both of them. He stops her, reinforcing Carrie's delusion that he is in love with her. Subsequently, Oliver gives her to A.R.G.U.S. as a new member of their Squad. Meanwhile, Ray rebrands Queen Consolidated into Palmer Technologies. Oliver struggles with how much time Felicity is spending with Ray; the situation is made worse when he finds them kissing. Ray is later shown working on a personal exosuit design called A.T.O.M. Elsewhere, A killer using boomerang blades appears in the city. In flashbacks to Hong Kong, Oliver and Tatsu go off to find Maseo after he goes missing, during which time she ends her displeasure towards Oliver. They return home to find Maseo safe and sound.
54	8	"The Brave and the Bold"	Jesse Warn	Story by : Greg Berlanti & Andrew Kreisberg; Teleplay by : Marc Guggenheim & Grainne Godfree	December 3, 2014	3J5158	3.92
Flashbacks to Hong Kong show Oliver learning how to effectively torture suspects to get information using his bow and arrow recovered from the island, which he used on Li Khuan Hui. In the present, Oliver and Roy track down the home of Digger Harkness, the boomerang-wielding murderer, but they only find A.R.G.U.S. operatives looking for the same man. Caitlin and Cisco arrive in Starling City to help Felicity investigate Sara's death. Digger attempts to kill Lyla; Roy, Oliver, and Barry Allen arrive and stop him. Later, Lyla reveals Digger was part of the Suicide Squad. Oliver's extreme interrogation methods lead Barry to question Oliver's emotionally stability. Digger finds Oliver's hideout, where he wounds Lyla before escaping. In order to leave town, Digger plants five bombs around the city. While Oliver captures Digger, Barry uses both his and Oliver's teams to defuse the bombs at the same time. Digger is incarcerated on the island with Slade. Lyla accepts Diggle's marriage proposal. Before Barry and his friends depart, he and Oliver decide to have a friendly duel. Note: This episode concludes a crossover event that begins on The Flash season 1 episode 8.
55	9	"The Climb"	Thor Freudenthal	Jake Coburn & Keto Shimizu	December 10, 2014	3J5159	3.06
The League demands Oliver find and turn over Sara's killer in 48 hours or they will begin murdering Starling City citizens, a mission led by his old friend Maseo, who has joined the League. S.T.A.R. Labs sends Felicity the DNA results, which appear to match Oliver. Realizing that she has been lying, the Arrow confronts Thea, who demonstrates her fighting skills before escaping. Later, Merlyn informs Oliver that he drugged Thea, then manipulated her into killing Sara and not remembering it. Merlyn filmed the event as leverage to force Oliver to take the blame and challenge Ra's to a duel, something no one has dared do in 67 years. Oliver is overpowered by Ra's, who impales him and kicks him over the side of a cliff. Meanwhile, Laurel reveals Sara's death to her mother, Dinah, and convinces her not to tell Quentin. Dinah asks her to avenge Sara's murder. Ray shows the A.T.O.M. design to Felicity and states his intention to use the exosuit to protect the city as a vigilante. In flashbacks, Oliver and Maseo learn that Chien has stolen an engineered supervirus. Chien breaks into Maseo's house, overpowering and kidnapping Tatsu.
56	10	"Left Behind"	Glen Winter	Marc Guggenheim & Erik Oleson	January 21, 2015	3J5160	3.06
In flashbacks, Oliver and Maseo steal the counterpart to the supervirus, thus making Chien's portion inert. Oliver also slips a GPS tracker onto one of Chien's men in order to locate Tatsu. In the present, Diggle and Roy work to continue protecting the city in Oliver's absence. With the Arrow missing, a new crime lord named Danny "Brick" Brickwell plots to take over the Glades. After Thea expresses concern over Oliver's absence, Merlyn investigates the site of the duel and brings the bloodied sword back to the hideout, proclaiming Oliver's death. Diggle discovers Brickwell's plan, to secure all the evidence against street enforcers so they are released from jail and forced to join his crew, and brings Roy to the police warehouse so the two of them can stop him. Fearing for their lives, Felicity decides to trap the duo in the warehouse and let Brickwell escape. Afterwards, Felicity proclaims the group non-existent without Oliver and quits both the team and helping Ray with his A.T.O.M. project. Laurel starts fighting Brickwell's operatives, donning an altered Canary costume. Merlyn advises Thea leave Starling City with him. Meanwhile, Maseo finds Oliver's body and takes it to Tatsu, who restores Oliver to consciousness.
57	11	"Midnight City"	Nick Copus	Wendy Mericle & Ben Sokolowski	January 28, 2015	3J5161	2.91
While Oliver attempts to rest and heal, members of the League arrive, forcing Maseo and Tatsu to kill them to protect Oliver. Maseo wounds himself so Ra's will believe he fought to prevent Oliver escaping. Roy and Diggle warn Laurel to stay off the streets after Roy saves her from a fight. Brick kidnaps the city's aldermen, murdering one during a rescue attempt. In exchange for the remaining aldermen, Brick demands that the police presence be removed from the Glades for good. The team is able to locate the aldermen and successfully save them, but the Mayor still agrees to pull the Glades' police after Brick reveals that he has targeted every legislative body member. Meanwhile, Felicity decides to rejoin the group and help Ray with his plan. Merlyn tells Thea about Ra's; she convinces him to stay and fight instead of running. Chase, the DJ for Verdant, is shown to be a spy for the League, informing Maseo about Merlyn's decision. In flashbacks, Maseo and Oliver manage to rescue Tatsu.
58	12	"Uprising"	Jesse Warn	Beth Schwartz & Brian Ford Sullivan	February 4, 2015	3J5162	2.94
Flashbacks chronicle the death of Merlyn's wife, him killing the man believed to have murdered Rebecca, and his journey to the League to seek training. In the present, Oliver decides to return to Starling City. Tatsu informs him that, if he wants to defeat Ra's, he will need to seek swordsman training from a student like Maseo. With the police out of the Glades, Roy and Laurel are tasked with fighting Brick's men to keep the peace. To help track down Brick's location, Quentin gives the team all the information the police have on Brick. Merlyn spies on the group as they review the evidence against Brick, thereby discovering that Brick was responsible for Rebecca's death. Merlyn propositions the team join forces with him to take down Brick, but they refuse. Instead, they rally the citizens of the Glades to take on Brick and his men. Merlyn overpowers Brick just before Oliver arrives, persuading him to spare Brick's life and let the police arrest him. Cindy tells Quentin that she knows the new female vigilante is not Sara. Afterwards, Oliver asks Merlyn to train him so that he can take on Ra's.
59	13	"Canaries"	Michael Schultz	Jake Coburn & Emilio Ortega Aldrich	February 11, 2015	3J5163	2.67
Werner Zytle escapes custody by poisoning a guard with Vertigo. As Oliver tries to keep Laurel from being a vigilante, Merlyn informs him that, to beat Ra's, he will need to bring Thea onto the team. Oliver reveals the truth to her, who accepts and praises him for the work he has been doing as the Arrow. Laurel tracks down Zytle and takes him on herself, only to be poisoned with Vertigo. She begins to hallucinate images of Sara, which attack her. Oliver and Roy arrive in time to get her back to the hideout for treatment. Oliver realizes that the group does not fight for him anymore, but rather for the city. Chase attempts to kill Thea, but Roy and Merlyn show up; Chase instead commits suicide. Oliver and Laurel successfully capture Zytle together. On Merlyn's advice, Oliver takes Thea to the island for training. Laurel finally tells Quentin that she has been using Sara's vigilante persona and about Sara's death, although he already knows both. In flashbacks, Oliver is captured by A.R.G.U.S. and interrogated over the location of Maseo and his family. Maseo is captured trying to save Oliver. Waller brings Oliver and Maseo to Starling City to find Chien.
60	14	"The Return"	Dermott Downs	Marc Guggenheim & Erik Oleson	February 18, 2015	3J5164	2.91
While on the island of Lian Yu, Oliver begins Thea's training. He goes to the A.R.G.U.S. prison to visit with Slade, but discovers the guard dead and Slade missing. Oliver warns Thea and they find out that Merlyn had Slade freed as a part of their training. Slade arrives and captures them, imprisoning them in the A.R.G.U.S. cell. The duo manage to open the doors and escape. Oliver reveals to Thea that she killed Sara. Slade arrives and engages them in combat. Oliver dissuades Thea from murdering Slade, who gets imprisoned back in the cell. The Queens return to Starling City, where Thea confronts Merlyn for forcing her to kill Sara. Thea decides to work with him to fight Ra's, but denounces their personal relationship. Quentin blames Laurel for hiding the truth. In flashbacks, Oliver and Maseo start tracking an employee of Queen Consolidated who is associated with Chien. Oliver looks in on his family and learns that Thea is using drugs. Oliver and Maseo acquire the virus and arrest Chien. Oliver is introduced to General Matthew Shrieve, who promises to free him after he is debriefed in China.
61	15	"Nanda Parbat"	Gregory Smith	Story by : Wendy Mericle & Ben Sokolowski; Teleplay by : Erik Oleson & Ben Sokolowski	February 25, 2015	3J5165	3.07
Oliver and Thea continue their training with Merlyn. Thea confesses the whole truth to Laurel, who instead blames Merlyn; Thea makes a deal to turn him over to the League. Laurel confronts Merlyn and is outmatched, but they are interrupted by Nyssa and the League, resulting in Merlyn's capture. Having imprisoned Nyssa, Oliver decides to go to Nanda Parbat to rescue Merlyn so Thea won't blame herself when she realizes that she has sentenced her father to death. Oliver and Diggle infiltrate Nanda Parbat, but walk into a trap set by Ra's. Oliver tells Diggle that Thea was not his only motive and that he could not accept defeat by someone else. Diggle states that he considers him a brother. Thea confesses the truth to Nyssa and offers her the chance at revenge. Ray tests the flight capabilities of his completed A.T.O.M. exo-suit. Instead of killing Oliver, Ra's expresses his praise for Oliver's courage and strength; he then asks Oliver to replace him as the head of the League. In flashbacks, Oliver is debriefed by Matthew and freed. On their way, Oliver and the Yamashiros are attacked. Oliver flees for safety with Akio, Maseo's son.
62	16	"The Offer"	Dermott Downs	Beth Schwartz & Brian Ford Sullivan	March 18, 2015	3J5166	2.56
Ra's explains that the localized pool of water in Nanda Parbat has healing effects that have allowed him to live far longer than any mortal man. The pool is becoming less effective on him, so Ra's is looking for a replacement. In a show of good faith to convince Oliver, Ra's releases Diggle and Merlyn, forgiving all blood debts. Oliver returns to Starling and releases Nyssa, who refused to kill Thea. Oliver and his team go back to stopping crime, battling a new criminal named Murmur, but Quentin tells the Arrow that he will not aid him anymore because the group hid Sara's death. Afterwards, Oliver realizes that he is not ready to give up being the Arrow; Oliver informs Maseo of his decision, who warns Oliver of the consequences of defying Ra's. Upset with Ra's for his offer to Oliver, Nyssa leaves him and returns to Starling City, befriending Laurel and deciding to train her. Ra's, dressed as the Arrow, frames the vigilante for murder. Thea leaves Malcolm and moves in with Roy. In flashbacks to Hong Kong, Oliver and Akio continue to be on the run, during which they seemingly stumble across a woman resembling Shado.
63	17	"Suicidal Tendencies"	Jesse Warn	Keto Shimizu	March 25, 2015	3J5167	2.86
Diggle and Lyla officially remarry, but Waller interrupts their honeymoon to recruit them for a Suicide Squad mission rescuing Senator Cray from a kidnapping. The kidnapping turns out be a ruse by Cray to help his bid for President. The squad rescues the hostages, but Floyd Lawton seemingly sacrifices himself so everyone can get out safely. He is announced as responsible for the kidnapping and Cray's involvement is covered up. The police issue a warrant for the Arrow, which Ray supports. Oliver discovers that Ra's has sent multiple assassins to impersonate him. In his new A.T.O.M. suit, Ray locates the Arrow and, through facial scans, learns his identity. Laurel refuses to accept Ray's evidence against Oliver. Ray engages Oliver in a fight, but Oliver disables Ray's suit. Oliver convinces Ray that he is being framed. Diggle decides to leave Oliver's team and Lyla resigns from A.R.G.U.S. Maseo, dressed as the Arrow, murders the mayor and shoots another arrow at Felicity. In flashbacks, Lawton struggles to transition back into society from the military, which is made worse by his wife and child leaving him. Lawton is propositioned by H.I.V.E. to assassinate Andrew Diggle, John's brother.
64	18	"Public Enemy"	Dwight Little	Marc Guggenheim & Wendy Mericle	April 1, 2015	3J5168	2.48
Ray takes the arrow for Felicity. Quentin issues an arrest warrant for the Arrow and his team, including shoot to kill orders. Oliver uses Nyssa to track Maseo's location. Ra's appears and repeats his demand. The police arrive, but Oliver and his group manage to escape. Ra's kidnaps Quentin and reveals the Arrow's identity, which Quentin then announces at a press conference. Oliver decides to turn himself in in exchange for immunity for his teammates. Roy dresses as the Arrow, stops Oliver's transport van, and surrenders to the police, claiming that he has been the Arrow all along. Meanwhile, Ray has developed a deadly thrombus that has no known cure. He reveals that he has nanobots that can destroy the clot. Felicity injects them and saves him with the help of Donna. In flashbacks, the woman resembling Shado turns out to be her twin sister Mei. The assailants come after them, but Maseo and Tatsu arrive to rescue them. Before leaving, Oliver tells Mei that Shado and Yao are dead.
65	19	"Broken Arrow"	Doug Aarniokoski	Story by : Jake Coburn; Teleplay by : Ben Sokolowski & Brian Ford Sullivan	April 15, 2015	3J5169	2.47
Roy is arrested and the District Attorney decides not to charge Oliver. However, Quentin knows the truth and continues investigating Oliver. Team Arrow starts working on how to stop metahuman Jake Simmons. Oliver enlists Ray's help. After a failed first attempt, Oliver and Ray sync their movements through a neural network but, when the network malfunctions during battle, Ray defeats Simmons himself and places him under S.T.A.R. Labs' custody. Cisco deduces that Simmons did not acquire his powers from the particle accelerator explosion. With the help of A.R.G.U.S, Roy fakes his own murder so that the public believes the Arrow is dead and Oliver innocent. As a result, Roy is forced to leave the city. Ra's visits Thea and impales her with his sword. In flashbacks, Oliver infiltrates A.R.G.U.S. to stop Waller, only to discover that she is a prisoner of Shrieve, who was behind the attack and plans to release the virus in Hong Kong. Oliver, Maseo, and Tatsu steal the vaccine and decide to stop Shrieve's plan.
66	20	"The Fallen"	Antonio Negret	Wendy Mericle & Oscar Balderrama	April 22, 2015	3J5170	2.72
Oliver rushes Thea to a hospital, where her death is said to be inevitable. Maseo contacts Oliver to let him know that, if he accepts Ra's offer, he will be able to use the Lazarus Pit to heal her. Malcolm warns against this, stating that the pit changes a person in their soul, but Oliver decides to take her to Nanda Parbat regardless. Thea is dipped into the pit and comes out healed, but in a state of confusion, her memories jumbled. Felicity has sex with Oliver before drugging him so the team, aided by Maseo, can sneak him out of the fortress. Cornered by the Assassins, Oliver wakes in time to order them to stand down. Afterward, Oliver returns to take his place as head of the League, alone. Thea wakes up in her apartment, her mind clear and distraught that Oliver sacrificed himself for her. Oliver renounces his old life, taking on an apprentice role in the League and the name "Al Sah-him" until he is ready to take over as the new Ra's. In flashbacks, Oliver, Maseo, and Tatsu go after the virus, but it is released during a fight.
67	21	"Al Sah-him"	Thor Freudenthal	Story by : Beth Schwartz; Teleplay by : Brian Ford Sullivan & Emilio Ortega Aldrich	April 29, 2015	3J5171	2.39
Oliver begins his training, which includes breaking down his psyche so that his allegiance is only to the League and his new identity as Al Sah-him. Ra's recounts the moment that he was chosen to become the leader of the League, a duel with his best friend Damien Darhk who saw himself as the heir. Ra's hesitated and Damien fled, stealing water from the Lazarus Pit and starting his own group. Damien is revealed to have hired Gholem Qadir and Mark Shaw. Subsequently, Oliver is directed to murder Nyssa. Oliver and the League come to Starling City, where team Arrow announce their protection of Nyssa. Oliver kidnaps Lyla to force the group to give her up. At the exchange, a fight breaks out and Nyssa is taken by the League. Oliver almost kills Diggle, but Thea, in her own suit, arrives and stops him. Felicity tells Thea that Roy is alive. In Nanda Parbat, Ra's orders Nyssa marry Oliver and Oliver use the Alpha/Omega virus to cleanse Starling City as a final act of commitment. In flashbacks, the vaccinated Oliver, Maseo, and Tatsu watch as the citizens of Hong Kong, including Akio, become infected.
68	22	"This Is Your Sword"	Wendey Stanzler	Story by : Erik Oleson; Teleplay by : Ben Sokolowski & Brian Ford Sullivan	May 6, 2015	3J5172	2.54
In flashbacks, Maseo and Oliver go after Shrieve to see if he has a cure. They only succeed in leading Shrieve to their location, with Akio dying in Tatsu's arms. In the present, Diggle and Laurel patrol Starling City, taking on any criminals they meet. Thea finds Roy and reunites with him. Oliver learns that Maseo is the one who provided Ra's with the Omega virus when he originally came to Nanda Parbat. Sneaking away from the castle, Oliver is shown to have been in league with Malcolm, that his agreement to become Ra's' heir was a charade to get close to Ra's and slowly dismantle the League from within. On Oliver's advice, Malcolm uses Tatsu to convince the team of the truth. The group, including Tatsu, Ray, and Malcolm go to Nanda Parbat, where Tatsu kills Maseo just before they are overrun by the League and captured. Malcolm reveals Oliver's treachery to Ra's, but Oliver manages to convince him of his loyalty. Roy secretly leaves Thea. Ra's exposes the team, excluding Tatsu, to the virus before sealing them away in a cell. Afterward, Oliver and Nyssa get married.
69	23	"My Name Is Oliver Queen"	John Behring	Story by : Greg Berlanti & Andrew Kreisberg; Teleplay by : Marc Guggenheim & Jake Coburn	May 13, 2015	3J5173	2.83
While Ra's and Oliver head toward Starling City, the team wakes in the dungeon. Malcolm informs them that he secretly gave them the vaccine. Barry arrives and frees them. Oliver and Nyssa attack Ra's and the other Assassins. Ra's escapes with a canister of the virus, vowing to destroy Starling. Ra's reveals he has four targets. Felicity locates them and Oliver organizes the group, along with Quentin and the police, to those places, with Thea arriving in Roy's suit to help. Oliver duels Ra's while the team successfully stops the attack, minimizing casualties. Oliver kills Ra's before being saved from the police by Felicity in the A.T.O.M. suit. Afterward, Oliver decides to have a normal life with Felicity instead of operating as a vigilante, knowing that there are others who can take his place. Oliver cedes the title of Ra's to Malcolm, to whom Nyssa kneels, but promises vengeance. Ray begins testing a way to miniaturize his A.T.O.M. suit, resulting in an explosion. In flashbacks, Maseo executes Shrieve after hours of torture by Oliver's hand. Oliver boards a ship headed to Coast City, choosing to live a lonely life away from his family.

== Cast and characters ==
=== Main ===
- Stephen Amell as Oliver Queen / Arrow
- Katie Cassidy as Laurel Lance / Black Canary
- David Ramsey as John Diggle
- Willa Holland as Thea Queen / Speedy
- Emily Bett Rickards as Felicity Smoak
- Colton Haynes as Roy Harper / Arsenal
- John Barrowman as Malcolm Merlyn / Dark Archer
- Paul Blackthorne as Quentin Lance

=== Recurring ===
- Caity Lotz as Sara Lance / Canary
- Audrey Marie Anderson as Lyla Michaels / Harbinger
- Kelly Hu as Chien Na Wei / China White
- Roger R. Cross as Lucas Hilton
- Alex Kingston as Dinah Lance
- Adrian Holmes as Frank Pike
- Cynthia Addai-Robinson as Amanda Waller
- Bex Taylor-Klaus as Sin
- Karl Yune as Maseo Yamashiro / Sarab
- Katrina Law as Nyssa al Ghul
- J. R. Ramirez as Ted Grant / Wildcat
- Brandon Routh as Ray Palmer / Atom
- Charlotte Ross as Donna Smoak
- Rila Fukushima as Tatsu Yamashiro / Katana
- Amy Gumenick as Carrie Cutter / Cupid
- Matt Nable as Ra's al Ghul
- Austin Butler as Chase
- Marc Singer as General Matthew Shrieve
- Christina Cox as Celia Castle

=== Guest ===
- Colin Donnell as Tommy Merlyn
- Grant Gustin as Barry Allen / Flash
- Carlos Valdes as Cisco Ramon
- Danielle Panabaker as Caitlin Snow
- Vinnie Jones as Danny Brickwell / Brick
- Peter Stormare as Werner Zytle / Vertigo
- Nolan Funk as Cooper Seldon
- Matt Ward as Simon Lacroix / Komodo
- David Cubitt as Mark Shaw / Manhunter
- Nick E. Tarabay as Digger Harkness / Captain Boomerang
- Manu Bennett as Slade Wilson
- Steven Culp as Senator Cray
- Doug Jones as Jake Simmons / Deathbolt
- Eugene Byrd as Andy Diggle
- Adrian Glynn McMorran as Michael Amar / Murmur
- Celina Jade as Mei

== Production ==
=== Development ===
Arrow was renewed for a third season by The CW on February 12, 2014.

=== Writing ===
Talking ahead of San Diego Comic Con, executive producer Marc Guggenheim stated that the theme of the season would be 'identity'. He and fellow EP Andrew Kreisberg confirmed that the series would continue six months on from the end of the previous season. Producers confirmed that the flashback sequences would continue this season, but be focused on Oliver's time in Hong Kong, and also examine the beginnings of his relationship with Amanda Waller.

Regarding character arcs, Guggenheim confirmed that both the characters of Thea Queen and Laurel Lance would be developed further over the season saying "Laurel and Thea are the two characters we haven't done as much with in the past, and they have the strongest storylines that we've ever given them." In particular, Thea's relationship with her father Malcolm Merlyn would be further explored, including a flashback to their encounter in the season two finale. Regarding Laurel, Kreisberg stated that "We're going to see Laurel take a few big steps toward her comic book self this season." Following previous revelations that the first episode would feature a date between Oliver and Felicity Smoak, Kreisberg stated that "The way the show has shaken out and the experiences the two have had, it feels like it's time to explore that." He also confirmed that Brandon Routh's Ray Palmer would be "invading Oliver's life in every aspect", as well as injecting more humor into the season.

It was also disclosed at San Diego that the season would feature an episode exploring the origins of the character Felicity Smoak, to be entitled "Oracle", which would focus on her time at M.I.T. It was confirmed by Marc Guggengheim in August that the episode name had been changed to "The Secret Origin of Felicity Smoak" and that the episode would also introduce Felicity's mother, Donna Smoak.

Kreisberg also confirmed that Colin Donnell would make an appearance as Tommy Merlyn in the second episode of the season, during a flashback sequence.

Guggenheim originally discussed with the other writers about bringing Jessica De Gouw back as Helena Bertinelli / Huntress. However, despite the crew loving to work with De Gouw and De Gouw's interest in returning, the season ultimately proved to be too short for a Huntress episode given that they ran out of stories to include in a 23-episode season, like that of Felicity Smoak's parents, not wishing to waste the character for an episode that couldn't do her "justice". As a compensation, it was decided to bring the Huntress back in the Arrow: Season 2.5 comic book series while planning to bring De Gouw back for the next season upon learning of the show's renewal.

The preview of the third season trailer revealed the season 'big bad' to be Ra's al Ghul. Talking about potential story arcs, Kreisberg noted the possibility of Oliver working with Malcolm Merlyn against Ra's – "We've established firmly that Ra's al Ghul hates Merlyn and Oliver doesn't like Merlyn. It's going to be series of who hates who more. The enemy of my enemy is my friend."

=== Casting ===
In July 2014, the series cast several season regulars, including Brandon Routh as Ray Palmer along with J. R. Ramirez was Ted Grant / Wildcat, Karl Yune as Maseo Yamashiro and Rila Fukushima as Tatsu Yamashiro. Devon Aoki was originally cast to play the latter, but scheduling conflicts led Aoki to be recast as Tatsu with Fukushima. Vinnie Jones was also cast as Danny Brickwell, in a guest role. The following month, it was announced that Charlotte Ross would be joining the series as Felicity's mother, Donna Smoak. Later the same month, Nolan Gerard Funk was cast as Felicity's former boyfriend Cooper Seldon. In September, Matt Nable was cast in the role of the season's antagonist, Ra's al Ghul. Film actor Liam Neeson, who played the character in Christopher Nolan's Batman films Batman Begins and The Dark Knight Rises, originally expressed an interest in reprising the role for the show, but couldn't take up offer when the showrunners approached him due to scheduling conflicts. Amy Gumenick was cast in a guest role as Carrie Cutter in the same month. Caity Lotz was confirmed to return as Sara Lance for at least three episodes at the start of the season.

=== Filming ===
The season began filming in Vancouver, British Columbia, Canada in July 2014.

=== Arrowverse tie-ins ===
The third season includes the first annual crossover with spin-off series The Flash: "Flash vs. Arrow".

== Release ==
=== Broadcast ===
The season began airing in the United States on The CW on October 8, 2014, and completed its 23-episode run on May 13, 2015.

=== Home media ===
Arrow: Season 3 was released as a 5-disc DVD set and as a 9-disc Blu-ray and DVD combo pack set on September 22, 2015, in the United States and September 28, 2015, in the United Kingdom. The DVD and Blu-ray box sets contain additional features, including making-of featurettes, deleted scenes, gag reel, and highlights from the Paley Fest.

== Reception ==
=== Critical response ===
Despite a strong critical start for the third-season premiere, the season received more negative reviews than the previous seasons.

Writing for Entertainment Weekly, Chancellor Agard noted that season had been an uneven one where the "highs have been rather high and the lows have been almost insufferable" and highlighted that the season' biggest problem seemed to lie in the characterisation and motivation of the season's big bad, Ra's al Ghul. He did however praise the development of the character Laurel Lance as well as the development of Oliver's relationship with John Diggle.

Katie Kulzick, of The A.V. Club noted that the season had a habit of "making bold moves and all too frequently backing away from, rather than embracing, the ramifications of these series-altering decisions." Despite the season's "significant problems", she felt groundwork had been laid for interesting potential storylines, in particular the development of Thea Queen becoming a member of the team omni man as Speedy, for Felicity Smoak with Palmer Technologies and for Oliver to develop a fresh perspective.

The season finale was described as "dull", "lacking scope", and "underwhelming" by IGN's Jesse Schedeen in light of the "high standard" the show had previously established for its finales. He cemented the mixed reception of the third season as being "haphazardly paced" and "struggling to develop a clear sense of direction".

The third season holds a score of 89% on Rotten Tomatoes based on 365 reviews, with an average rating of 8.37/10. The site's consensus concluding: "Arrow stays on target with new characters and a steady supply of exciting action."

=== Ratings ===
The third season averaged 3.52 million viewers across the 23 episodes, ranking 135th among television show viewership.

Viewership and ratings per episode of Arrow season 3
No.	Title	Air date	Rating/share (18–49)	Viewers (millions)	DVR (18–49)	Total (18–49)
1	"The Calm"	October 8, 2014	1.0	2.83	0.4	1.4
2	"Sara"	October 15, 2014	0.8	2.32	0.6	1.4
3	"Corto Maltese"	October 22, 2014	0.9	2.55	—N/a	—N/a
4	"The Magician"	October 29, 2014	1.0	2.49	—N/a	—N/a
5	"The Secret Origin of Felicity Smoak"	November 5, 2014	1.1/3	2.73	—N/a	—N/a
6	"Guilty"	November 12, 2014	0.9/3	2.60	0.6	1.5
7	"Draw Back Your Bow"	November 19, 2014	0.9/3	2.64	0.6	1.5
8	"The Brave and the Bold"	December 3, 2014	1.4/4	3.92	—N/a	—N/a
9	"The Climb"	December 10, 2014	1.1/3	3.06	—N/a	—N/a
10	"Left Behind"	January 21, 2015	1.1/4	3.06	0.7	1.8
11	"Midnight City"	January 28, 2015	1.1/3	2.91	0.7	1.8
12	"Uprising"	February 4, 2015	1.2/4	2.94	—N/a	—N/a
13	"Canaries"	February 11, 2015	1.1/3	2.67	—N/a	—N/a
14	"The Return"	February 18, 2015	1.2/4	2.91	—N/a	—N/a
15	"Nanda Parbat"	February 25, 2015	1.1/3	3.07	—N/a	—N/a
16	"The Offer"	March 18, 2015	0.9/3	2.56	0.7	1.6
17	"Suicidal Tendencies"	March 25, 2015	1.0/4	2.86	0.8	1.8
18	"Public Enemy"	April 1, 2015	0.8/3	2.48	0.6	1.4
19	"Broken Arrow"	April 15, 2015	0.9/3	2.47	0.7	1.6
20	"The Fallen"	April 22, 2015	1.0/3	2.72	—N/a	—N/a
21	"Al Sah-him"	April 29, 2015	0.9	2.39	—N/a	—N/a
22	"This Is Your Sword"	May 6, 2015	1.0/3	2.54	0.7	1.7
23	"My Name Is Oliver Queen"	May 13, 2015	1.0/4	2.83	0.7	1.7

=== Accolades ===
Arrow, season 3 award nominations
Year	Award	Category	Nominee(s)	Result	Ref.
2015	Leo Awards	Best Cinematography Dramatic Series	C. Kim Miles ("Blind Spot")	Nominated	
2015	Leo Awards	Best Costume Design Dramatic Series	Maya Mani ("Suicide Squad")	Nominated	
2015	Leo Awards	Best Lead Performance BY A Female Dramatic Series	Emily Bett Rickards ("Left Behind")	Nominated	
2015	MTV Fandom Awards	TV Dramas	Arrow	Nominated	
2015	MTV Fandom Awards	Ship of the Year	Olicity (Stephen Amell and Emily Bett Rickards)	Won	
2015	Saturn Awards	Best Superhero Adaption Television Series	Arrow	Nominated	
2015	Teen Choice Awards	Choice Sci-Fi/Fantasy TV Show	Arrow	Nominated	
2015	Teen Choice Awards	Choice Sci-Fi/Fantasy TV Actor	Stephen Amell	Nominated	
2015	Teen Choice Awards	Choice Sci-Fi/Fantasy TV Actress	Emily Bett Rickards	Nominated	
2015	Teen Choice Awards	Choice TV Liplock	Stephen Amell and Emily Bett Rickards	Nominated	
2015	Teen Choice Awards	Choice TV Villain	Matt Nable	Nominated	
