= Keto Shimizu =

American television and comic book writer

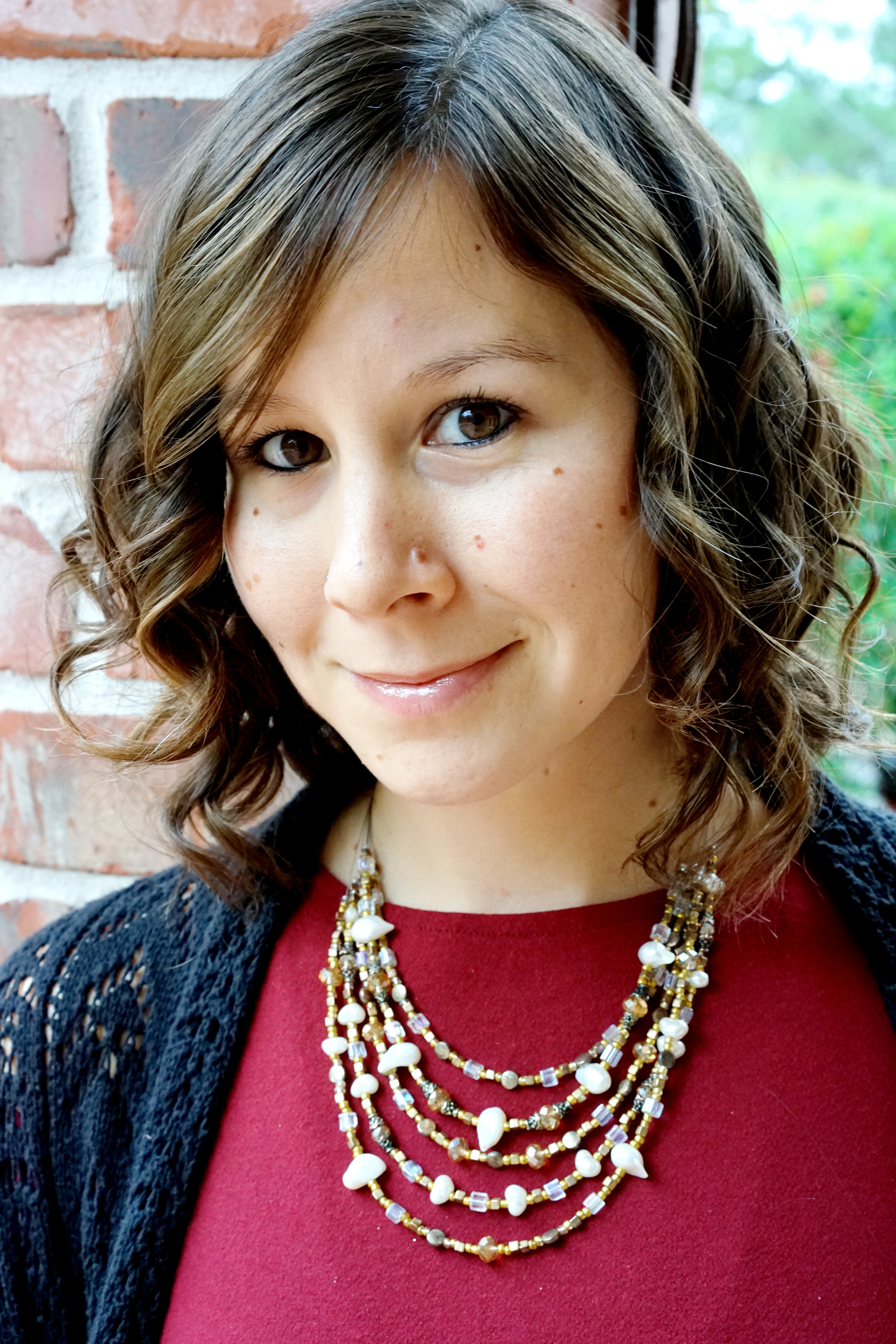
- Keto Shimizu in November 2015
- Born: December 23, 1984 (age 41); Princeton, New Jersey, U.S.
- Occupations: Television and comic book writer
- Years active: 2006–present
- Spouse: Christopher "Bradley" Lastrapes
- Children: 2

Keto Shimizu (born December 23, 1984) is an American television writer, producer, and comic book writer. She is known for her work on the North American adaptation of Being Human and for her substantial contributions to Greg Berlanti's and The CW's Arrowverse, including being the showrunner of Legends of Tomorrow.

== Life and career ==
Shimizu accredits her love for storytelling to Waldorf teachings, as her mother Patricia was one of the founders of the first Waldorf school in Princeton, New Jersey. Shimizu's father Yoshiaki was Japanese, and a historian of Asian art. She graduated from Twinfield High School in Plainfield, VT, and Emerson College in Boston. Shimizu and her husband, Christopher Lastrapes, have two sons together.

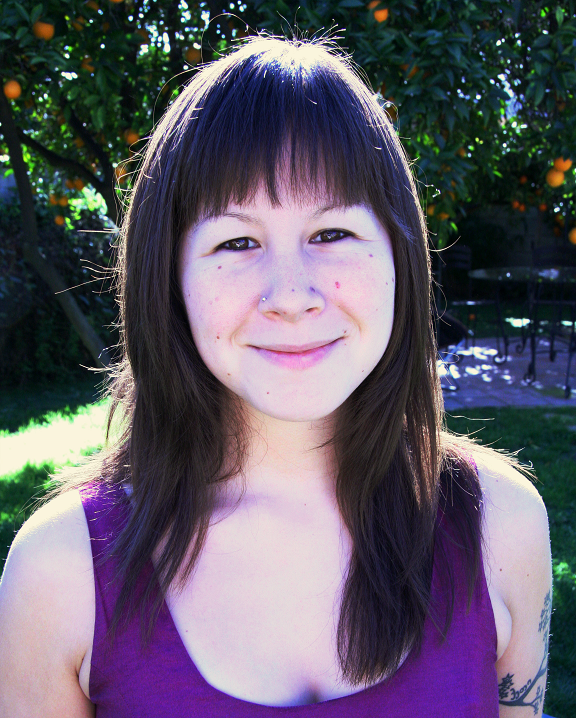
Keto in 2011

Shimizu is a fan of Batman, and attributes comic book and television writer Paul Dini as being a notable favorite interpreter. She also counts John Ostrander, Alan Moore, Kurt Busiek, Frank Miller, and Chris Claremont as influences in her writing.

Her first foray into film was with the western short Razor Man, which she wrote and directed, in 2006. The film depicts a lone gunslinger's quest for vengeance in rural 1891 Colorado. In 2007, she directed and wrote a second short film entitled Threads.

She has worked a vast array of positions in her career including post-production assistant (The Spirit, Tron: Legacy), visual effects editorial coordinator (Clash of the Titans), cinematographer (short film The Storm), and camera operator/first assistant to camera (web series Downers Grove).

She worked as a staff writer on the short-lived NBC series The Cape.

She was honored by her alma mater Emerson College with the EVVY Alumni Award of Distinction in 2020.

=== Being Human ===
In 2012, she joined the Syfy adaptation of Being Human, as a story editor. She went on to become a writer on the show, scripting three episodes ("Dream Reaper", "I'm So Lonesome I Could Die", and "Of Mice and Wolfman").

=== Arrowverse ===
In the summer of 2013, Shimizu boarded the DC Comics produced Green Arrow origin series Arrow, as an executive story editor and writer. Her first episode she co-wrote, with executive producer Marc Guggenheim, was "Broken Dolls", which was critically lauded. Other sophomore season episodes she contributed to include "Blast Radius", "Suicide Squad", and "The Man Under the Hood".

In 2014, she wrote a prequel comic book series would with Guggenheim that bridged the second and third seasons of Arrow entitled Arrow 2.5. Some of her work emphasizes the characters she established, with Bryan Q. Miller, in the episode "Suicide Squad".

With the commencement of the series' third season, Shimizu was promoted to co-producer, along with Ben Sokolowski. She and co-executive producer Jake Coburn co-wrote the season's second installment, "Sara". She co-wrote the sixth episode, "Guilty", with co-executive producer Erik Oleson. She and Coburn co-penned the season's mid-season finale "The Climb", which introduced supervillain Ra's al Ghul (Matt Nable). Shimizu scripted her first solo outing with "Suicidal Tendencies", helmed by Jesse Warn. It saw the reformation of Task Force X, with new member Cupid/Carrie Cutter; and explored the past of Deadshot.

Shimizu co-wrote, with Sokolowski, the fourteenth episode, "Fallout", of Arrow's sister-series The Flash. It showcased the DC superhero Firestorm (Ronnie Raymond and Martin Stein) and featured the debut of supervillain Gorilla Grodd.

During the 2015 Winter Television Critics Association tour, The CW announced an animated miniseries, Vixen, centered around the DC heroine. It premiered on CW Seed in August of the year, and was released weekly on Tuesdays. It shares the same universe as Arrow and The Flash. The series is written by Shimizu, Arrow showrunner Wendy Mericle, Brian Ford Sullivan, and comic book writer Lauren Certo.

At the start of production for Arrow's fourth season, Shimizu was promoted once again; being named producer, along with Sokolowski. She co-scripted the second episode of the season "The Candidate" with Guggenheim; which saw the introduction of supervillain Anarky. She and new co-executive producer Speed Weed wrote the seventh episode "Brotherhood". Shimizu next contributed to the 13th episode "Sins of the Father" with Sokolowski; and the 15th episode "Taken", which she and Sullivan wrote a teleplay for, based on a story from Guggenheim; and the critically panned "Eleven-Fifty-Nine", co-written with Guggenheim.

With the conclusion of the fourth season, Shimizu departed Arrow and relocated to spin-off DC's Legends of Tomorrow in its second season as co-executive producer, which featured the Justice Society of America. She co-wrote the Reagan-era episode "Compromised", the George Lucas-themed "Raiders of the Lost Art", the dinosaur-filled "Land of the Lost", and the Tolkien-inspired "Fellowship of the Spear". Jesse Schedeen of IGN, Rob Bricken of Io9, and Charlie Ridgely of ComicBook.com all described the revamped second season as "the best DC TV series."

At the beginning of Legends of Tomorrow's fourth season, Shimizu was named executive producer and co-showrunner of the series. After her promotion, Shimizu would go onto write an additional 12 episodes of the show, including the series finale "Knocked Down, Knocked Up".

She later served as executive producer on the animated special "Beebo Saves Christmas" in 2021.

=== Night's Edge ===
In 2023, it was announced she was adapting the vampire novel Night's Edge for Freeform with executive producer Jac Schaeffer.

=== The Hunting Party ===
In 2025, she joined the NBC thriller The Hunting Party as writer and producer. She wrote the second episode "Clayton Jessup" and the eight episode "Denise Glenn" in the first season.
