= Haunted (Arrow) =

- Arrow episode
- Episode no.: Season 4 Episode 5
- Directed by: John Badham
- Written by: Brian Ford Sullivan; Oscar Balderrama
- Cinematography by: Corey Robson
- Editing by: Thomas Wallerstein
- Production code: 3J5804
- Original air date: November 4, 2015

Guest appearances
- Neal McDonough as Damien Darhk (special appearance by); Matt Ryan as John Constantine (special guest star); Caity Lotz as Sara Lance (special guest star); Echo Kellum as Curtis Holt; Jimmy Akingbola as Baron Reiter; Ryan Robbins as Conklin; Parker Young as Alex Davis; Brandon Routh as Ray Palmer (special guest star)

Episode chronology
← Previous "Beyond Redemption"	Next → "Lost Souls"
- Arrow season 4

"Haunted" is the fifth episode of the fourth season of the American television series Arrow, based on the DC Comics character Green Arrow, revolving around billionaire playboy Oliver Queen as he returns to Starling City (later renamed Star City), after having been shipwrecked for five years, and becomes a bow-wielding, hooded vigilante who sets out to fight crime and corruption. It is set in the Arrowverse, sharing continuity with the other television series of the universe. The episode was written by Brian Ford Sullivan and Oscar Balderrama, and directed by John Badham.

Stephen Amell stars as Oliver, and is joined by principal cast members Katie Cassidy, David Ramsey, Willa Holland, Emily Bett Rickards and Paul Blackthorne. The episode sees Oliver bringing sorcerer John Constantine for help because Sara Lance has become feral following her resurrection via the Lazarus Pit. Caity Lotz guest stars as Sara and Matt Ryan as Constantine, reprising his role from the NBC series of the same name. The episode was filmed in Vancouver, from August 17 to 27, 2015.

"Haunted" was first aired in the United States on The CW on November 4, 2015, and was watched by 2.60 million viewers with a 1.1/4 share among adults aged 18 to 49. The episode received positive reviews from critics.

== Plot ==
On Lian Yu, Oliver Queen is taken by Conklin to see Baron Reiter, his superior. Reiter has captured John Constantine, a sorcerer who has come to the island in search of the Orb of Horus. Constantine escapes with Oliver, and forces him to help locate the Orb. Once Constantine finds it, a booby trap is triggered but Oliver saves him, and both form a mutual respect. Constantine warns Oliver to be wary of Reiter's real plans and casts a spell on Oliver he says will be helpful later.

Five years later in Star City, a feral Sara Lance takes to killing, having been resurrected by her sister Laurel via the Lazarus Pit. Whilst examining the thumb drive containing Ray Palmer's dying declaration, Felicity Smoak detects a digital noise and asks Curtis Holt to decode it. H.I.V.E. leader Damien Darhk blackmails Quentin Lance into installing a computer virus in a security company.

Oliver is shocked to see Sara alive and feral. For Quentin's safety, he convinces John Diggle to go along. Oliver and Felicity realize that Sara only targets women resembling Oliver's sister Thea, her killer. Sara attacks Thea who survives, but is hospitalized. Oliver berates Laurel for resurrecting Sara; Laurel counters that Oliver does not see her as an equal, and has never cared as much about her family as she cares for his.

While Quentin installs the virus, Diggle sees his brother Andy's name among the list of individuals being deleted. Darhk tells Quentin that Andy was competition for H.I.V.E. in Afghanistan and that they had to kill him. Over Laurel's objections, Thea decides to resign to her fate. Sara nearly kills Thea, but flees when Oliver and Laurel interrupt. Oliver determines that the Pit did not bring back Sara's soul, but his team decides to use Thea as bait to lure Sara. She attacks Thea as expected, but Oliver tranquilizes Sara with an arrow. He later calls Constantine for help.

Constantine travels with Oliver and Laurel to the "other side", where Oliver and Laurel free a trapped Sara while Constantine defeats a malevolent spirit. The trio return safely to the real world, with Sara's soul restored. Meanwhile, Quentin gives Diggle a classified file on Andy, provided by Darhk, which states that he was killed because he was a drug cartel leader. Curtis has decoded Ray's message: "I'm alive, and I'm in trouble."

== Production ==
In May 2015, Stephen Amell revealed that he had discussions with DC Entertainment to portray Oliver Queen on NBC's Constantine before its cancelation because its title character, John Constantine (Matt Ryan) is an expert on the Lazarus Pit, a concept used on Arrow. Despite NBC canceling Constantine, Arrow co-creator Marc Guggenheim revealed a desire to integrate the character into the Arrowverse, saying, "A lot of the pieces are in place, except for that one final piece, which is what's the fate of Constantine? That's the tricky thing. But it comes up in the writers' room constantly – we have a number of ideas, one idea that's particularly exciting to me. We're in a little bit of a wait-and-see mode".

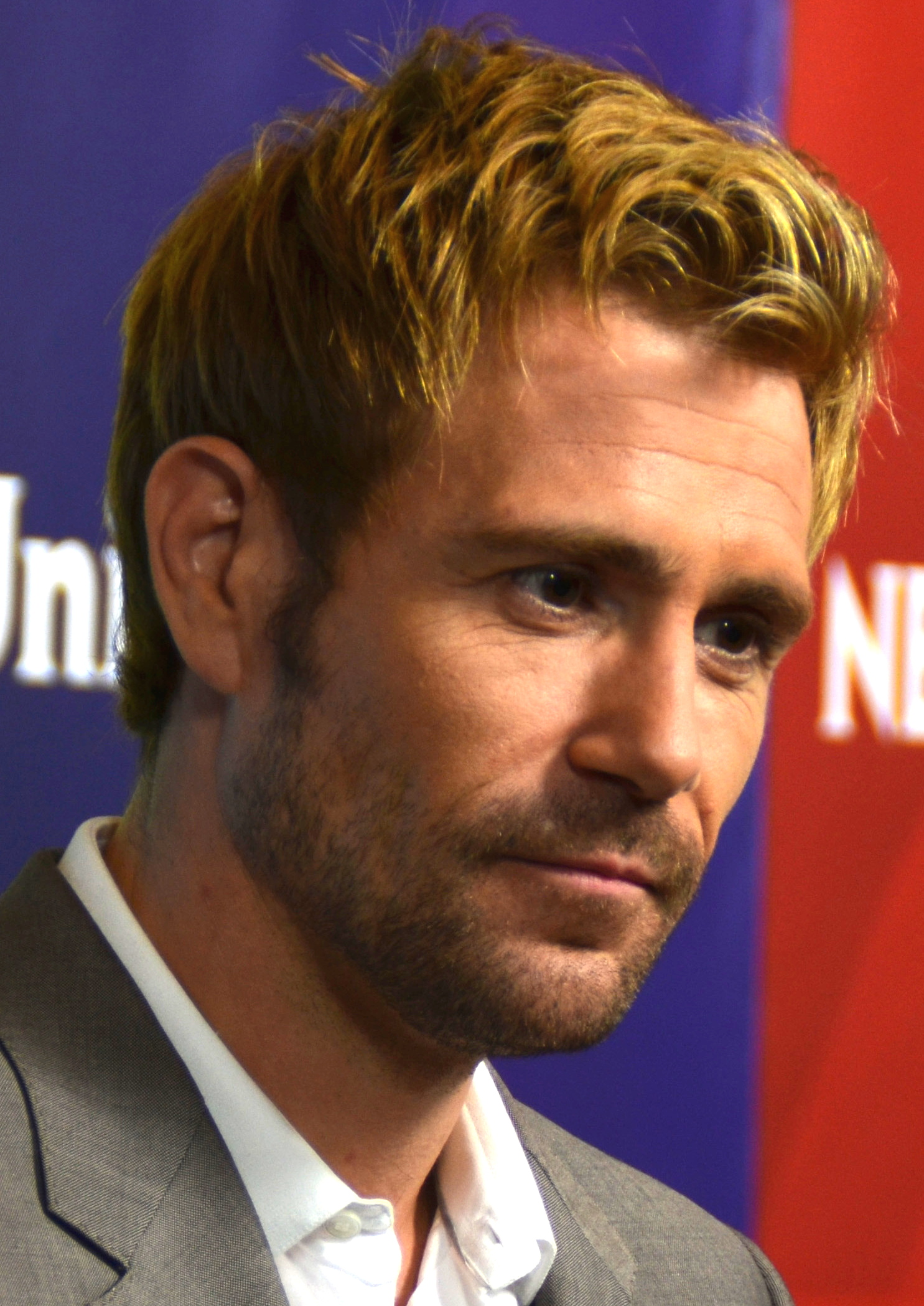
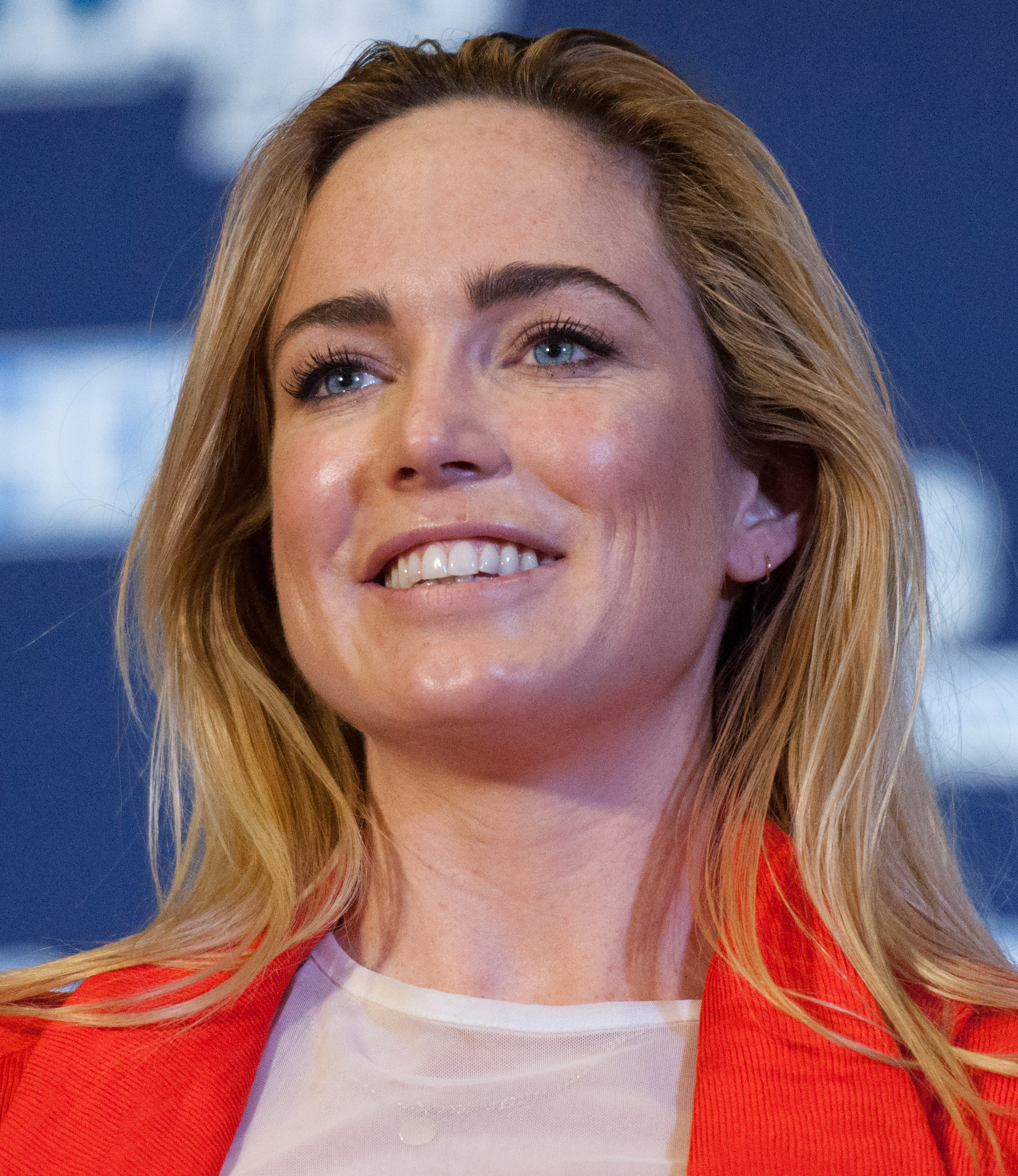
Actors Matt Ryan and Caity Lotz, who reprise their roles as John Constantine and Sara Lance respectively.

In August 2015, it was announced that Ryan would appear as Constantine on Arrow in the fourth season episode "Haunted", per a "one-time-only" deal that would involve his character being "brought in to deal with the fallout of the resurrection of Sara Lance (Caity Lotz) via Ra's al Ghul's Lazarus Pit." Season four co-showrunner Wendy Mericle confirmed that this version of Constantine was the same character that had appeared in the NBC series. Apart from Amell, principal cast members Katie Cassidy, David Ramsey, Willa Holland, Emily Bett Rickards and Paul Blackthorne reprise their roles as Laurel Lance, John Diggle, Thea Queen, Felicity Smoak and Quentin Lance. Additional guest stars include Neal McDonough as Damien Darhk, Echo Kellum as Curtis Holt, Jimmy Akingbola as Baron Reiter, Ryan Robbins as Conklin, Parker Young as Alex Davis, and Brandon Routh as the uncredited voice of Ray Palmer.

As Arrow and Constantine were both produced by Warner Bros. Television, the producers of Arrow were able to acquire Ryan's original outfits. John Badham, who directed the Constantine episode "Danse Vaudou", directed "Haunted", which was written by Brian Ford Sullivan and Oscar Balderrama. On filming the episode, Guggenheim stated it felt like the production team was "doing a Constantine/Arrow crossover", adding that "we're just really glad we got the chance to extend Matt Ryan's run as Constantine by at least one more hour of television. I think you'll see he fits very neatly into our universe. It never feels forced, it feels right." Ryan was already appearing in a Broadway play version of Thérèse Raquin, so to accommodate his schedule, "Haunted", which was written as the season's fifth episode, had to be filmed in the slot of the fourth episode. Shooting took place in Vancouver, from August 17 to 27, 2015.

== Release ==
=== Broadcast ===
"Haunted" was first aired in the United States on The CW on November 4, 2015. It was watched by 2.60 million viewers with a 1.1/4 share among adults aged 18 to 49.

=== Critical reception ===
The review aggregator website Rotten Tomatoes reported a 94% approval rating for the episode, based on 16 reviews, with an average rating of 7.86/10. The site's critical consensus reads, "Arrow does a less-than-convincing job of integrating the supernatural John Constantine into Oliver Queen's world, but the two characters play-off each other to fun-filled effect."

Kevin Yeoman of Screen Rant called the episode a success "simply because the writers find it so easy to integrate the character into the plot, which is about as easy as flipping a switch." Jenny Raftery of Vulture rated the episode three out of five, and was particularly appreciative of Ramsey's performance as Diggle, especially in the scene where he learns about Andy. Entertainment Weekly's Jonathon Dornbush wrote, "Constantine, for me, was always a deeply flawed show with the potential to be so much more. Ryan, given network limitations, embodied the character as best he could, and so it's a joy to see him back, hopefully not for the last time." Jesse Schedeen of IGN lamented the fact that Constantine's role was not as big as he had hoped and criticized the episode's subplots as extraneous, but concluded that, on the whole, the episode delivered a "memorable team-up adventure" and rated it 8.1 out of 10. Collider's Dave Trumbore rated the episode 4 out of 5, calling it "An incredibly fun episode that moved at a crazy clip, but lacked any room to explore the true emotional depth the writers attempted to resolve."
