= This Is Your Sword =

This Is Your Sword may refer to:

- "This Is Your Sword", a song by Bruce Springsteen on his 2014 album High Hopes
- "This Is Your Sword", a 2015 episode of Arrow
