= Al Sah-him =

Al Sah-him (English: The Arrow) may refer to:

- "Al Sah-him" (Arrow episode), 21st episode of the 3rd season of Arrow
- Al Sah-him (Arrowverse), the League of Assassins name given to Oliver Queen
