= Vixen (web series) =

Animated series

- Genre: Action; Adventure; Superhero
- Based on: Vixen by: Gerry Conway; Bob Oksner
- Voices of: Megalyn Echikunwoke
- Composers: Blake Neely; Nathaniel Blume
- Country of origin: United States
- Original language: English
- No. of seasons: 2
- No. of episodes: 12

Production
- Executive producers: Greg Berlanti; Marc Guggenheim; Andrew Kreisberg
- Producer: James Tucker
- Editor: Christopher D. Lozinski
- Running time: 4–7 minutes
- Production companies: Berlanti Productions; Blue Ribbon Content; DC Entertainment; Warner Bros. Animation

Original release
- Network: CW Seed
- Release: August 25, 2015 – November 18, 2016

Related
- Arrowverse

Vixen, also known as DC Comics' Vixen, is an American animated web series from executive producers Greg Berlanti, Marc Guggenheim and Andrew Kreisberg, which debuted on August 25, 2015, on The CW's online streaming platform, CW Seed. It is based on the DC Comics character Mari McCabe / Vixen, a costumed superhero crime-fighter with the power to mimic the abilities of animals. The series is set in the Arrowverse, the same fictional universe as Arrow, The Flash, Supergirl and Legends of Tomorrow. In January 2016, the series was renewed for a second season, which premiered on October 13, 2016.

== Premise ==
After her parents were killed in Africa by local corruption, Mari McCabe inherits her family's Tantu Totem, gaining the powers of the animal kingdom, using them to fight as Vixen to stop threats like those that claimed her family.

== Cast and characters ==
=== Main ===
- Megalyn Echikunwoke as Mari McCabe / Vixen:

Born in an African village near the river of Zambezi but raised in the United States, Mari is orphaned at a young age and inherits her family's mystical Tantu Totem, allowing her to access the powers of the animal kingdom. Kimberly Brooks voices a young Mari.

- Neil Flynn as Chuck McCabe: Mari's foster father.
- Sean Patrick Thomas as Professor Macalester: A university professor under Kuasa's employ.
- Anika Noni Rose as Kuasa: Mari's older sister who seeks to obtain the Totem for herself.

=== Recurring ===
- Carlos Valdes as Cisco Ramon: A mechanical engineer at S.T.A.R. Labs who assists Barry Allen. Valdes reprises his role from The Flash.
- Grant Gustin as Barry Allen / Flash: A Central City superhero with super speed. Gustin reprises his role from The Flash.
- Stephen Amell as Oliver Queen / Arrow / Green Arrow: A Starling City vigilante archer. Amell reprises his role from Arrow.
- Emily Bett Rickards as Felicity Smoak: A friend and partner of Oliver Queen. Rickards reprises her role from Arrow.
- Hakeem Kae-Kazim as Benatu Eshu: A former general responsible for destroying Mari's village, seeking Zambezi's lost totems.
- Katie Cassidy as Laurel Lance / Black Canary: A Star City attorney-turned-vigilante and a member of Oliver Queen's team. Cassidy reprises her role from Arrow.
- Brandon Routh as Ray Palmer / Atom: A scientist, inventor, businessman and CEO of Palmer Technologies who developed a power-suit that is now capable of shrinking. Routh reprises his role from Arrow.

=== Guest ===
- Kari Wuhrer as Patty McCabe: Mari's deceased foster mother.
- Franz Drameh as Jefferson Jackson / Firestorm: A former high school athlete whose pro career was derailed by an injury who now works as an auto mechanic and serves as half of Firestorm with Martin Stein. Drameh reprises his role from The Flash.
- Victor Garber as Martin Stein / Firestorm: A nuclear physicist focused on transmutation, who is also half of the character Firestorm with Jefferson Jackson. Garber reprises his role from The Flash.
- Toks Olagundoye as Esi: Mari's deceased biological mother.

== Episodes ==
=== Season 1 (2015) ===
Vixen, season 1 episodes
No. overall	No. in season	Title	Directed by	Written by	Original release date
1	1	"Family Reunion"	James Tucker	Wendy Mericle, Keto Shimizu, Brian Ford Sullivan, and Lauren Certo	August 25, 2015
2	2	"Family Reunion"	James Tucker	Wendy Mericle, Keto Shimizu, Brian Ford Sullivan, and Lauren Certo	September 1, 2015
3	3	"Family Reunion"	James Tucker	Wendy Mericle, Keto Shimizu, Brian Ford Sullivan, and Lauren Certo	September 8, 2015
4	4	"Family Reunion"	James Tucker	Wendy Mericle, Keto Shimizu, Brian Ford Sullivan, and Lauren Certo	September 15, 2015
5	5	"Family Reunion"	James Tucker	Wendy Mericle, Keto Shimizu, Brian Ford Sullivan, and Lauren Certo	September 22, 2015
6	6	"Family Reunion"	James Tucker	Wendy Mericle, Keto Shimizu, Brian Ford Sullivan, and Lauren Certo	September 29, 2015
When Mari returns to Detroit after searching for information on her birth parents, she ends up in jail for stabbing a potential employer in the hand with a pen. Her foster father, Chuck, posts her bail, and the two are confronted in an alley by some thugs looking to take Mari's Tantu Totem, which she inherited from her birth parents at a young age. Mari uses the totem's powers to defeat the thugs, and the next day, visits Professor Macalester hoping to learn more about the totem and her family. Elsewhere, at S.T.A.R. Labs, Cisco becomes aware of Mari and her powers, and Barry Allen (The Flash) and Oliver Queen (The Arrow) go to Detroit to investigate. In Detroit, Mari shows Chuck the totem's powers, when Barry and Oliver show up at their house. Convinced they want to imprison her, she flees, with the two heroes giving chase. Finally getting Mari to stop, the Flash and Arrow try to convince Mari to let them help her. Not trusting them, Mari leaves and returns to Professor Macalester in hopes of getting more answers. Unbeknownst to Mari, Macalester is working for Kuasa, who shows up looking to retrieve the totem. Unable to remove the totem from her neck, Mari tries to escape and is shot by Kuasa's men. She wakes up in an abandoned African village near the river of Zambezi, where Kuasa reveals she is her older sister and this is her birthplace, telling her the history of the totem and the village's destruction. Kuasa reveals she was chosen to protect the totem and attempts to sever the bond it has with Mari. The attempt fails and Mari flees, though she passes out shortly after, allowing Kuasa to claim the totem. After coming to, the animal spirits of the totem confront Mari, telling her she is its true wielder. With their support, Mari returns to the village and defeats Kuasa and her followers, regaining the totem. Back in Detroit, Mari begins fighting crime as the vigilante "Vixen", finally knowing her purpose in life, with Arrow and Flash promising to offer assistance should she ever ask.

=== Season 2 (2016) ===
Vixen, season 2 episodes
No. overall	No. in season	Title	Directed by	Written by	Original release date
7	1	"Trial by Fire"	Curt Geda	Lauren Certo, Nolan Dunbar and Sarah Tarkoff	October 13, 2016
8	2	"Trial by Fire"	Curt Geda	Lauren Certo, Nolan Dunbar and Sarah Tarkoff	October 21, 2016
9	3	"Trial by Fire"	Curt Geda	Lauren Certo, Nolan Dunbar and Sarah Tarkoff	October 28, 2016
10	4	"Trial by Fire"	Curt Geda	Lauren Certo, Nolan Dunbar and Sarah Tarkoff	November 4, 2016
11	5	"Trial by Fire"	Curt Geda	Lauren Certo, Nolan Dunbar and Sarah Tarkoff	November 11, 2016
12	6	"Trial by Fire"	Curt Geda	Lauren Certo, Nolan Dunbar and Sarah Tarkoff	November 18, 2016
Months after returning to Detroit, Mari attends a lecture by Macalester on the five totems of Zambezi, which grant their wearers the powers of the elemental forces–air, earth, water, fire, and spirit. He reveals that the fire totem has been found, and would be on display at the Detroit Museum. Mari confronts Macalester about kidnapping her, and he tells her her Tantu Totem is also one of the lost totems of Zambezi, the spirit totem. Mari gets a call from Cisco to help the Flash and Firestorm (Jefferson Jackson and Martin Stein) defeat Mark Mardon (Weather Wizard). Mari ends up in the hospital after fighting Weather Wizard, and learns that the fire totem and other gems had been stolen from the Detroit Museum. Searching for the person who performed the heist, she eventually learns that Benatu Eshu has stolen the fire totem, traveling from Zambezi to claim it. As she confronts him, Eshu claims to know Mari's birth mother. The two fight, but Eshu proves too powerful for Mari. Mari goes to Macalester to find a way to stop the fire totem and he suggests they visit Kuasa. Finding her in an African hospital, Kuasa tells them that Eshu was a general who raided their village in search of Kuasa and Mari's mother and the Tantu Totem. She suggests that in order to defeat Eshu, they must find the water totem, which leads them to Star City. Once they find the water totem, Kuasa double crosses Mari and takes the totem for herself. Mari gives chase and is able to contain Kuasa with the help of Dinah Laurel Lance (Black Canary) and Ray Palmer (The Atom). Felicity Smoak informs the heroes that Eshu is rampaging through Detroit, which makes Mari reluctantly ask Kuasa to help them defeat Eshu. The heroes travel to Detroit to confront Eshu, where Macalester calls Mari and tells her that each totem has a core, which, if destroyed, will cause the totem to lose their powers. The heroes are quickly overpowered, and despite her use of the water totem, Eshu kills Kuasa, leaving Mari the only one remaining. Mari is able to subdue Eshu underwater to weaken him, and takes the fire totem. Macalester arrives to tell her that in order sever Eshu's ties to the totem, it needs to be smashed by someone with great strength. Mari summons many spirits from the animal kingdom and is able to destroy the totem. Later, she joins Oliver Queen (Green Arrow), Flash, Black Canary and Atom in Coast City to take on a threat.

== Development ==
In January 2015, The CW announced that a six-episode animated web-series centered on Vixen from Marc Guggenheim would be debuting on CW Seed in late 2015, and would be set in the Arrowverse with Arrow and The Flash. In total, the six episodes encompass one 30-minute story. The series, described as an "origin story", is set in Detroit, Michigan and "prominently" features characters from Arrow and The Flash. Keto Shimizu and Brian Ford Sullivan, writers on Arrow, also serve as writers for Vixen. On adding Vixen to the established universe, Guggenheim said, "Vixen's such a great character. First of all, she represents magic, which is an area that we haven't explored on either of the two shows just yet. One thing we're always saying is, 'Flash is very different from Arrow, Arrow is very different from Flash.' If Arrow is crime and The Flash is science, Vixen has a big magic component." Guggenheim also talked about why the series originated as animation, saying, "One of the things we can do in animation is really push the envelope in a way that we can't on either of the two shows. So there's a much larger production value. We're taking advantage of the animated form."

At the 2015 San Diego Comic-Con, it was revealed that the series would debut on August 25, 2015, with new episodes debuting weekly. In July 2015, Guggenheim revealed the series takes place around episode S03E15 and S03E16 of Arrow, saying, "We were shooting [episode] S03E14 [of Arrow] when we wrote Vixen so we sort of tied it to the continuity not of when it ultimately came out because that would require us projecting very, very far into the future, but we just committed to our timeline of around when we were writing it. We knew, of course, at that point that Oliver would be going off to the League of Assassins and changing his costume as a result, so this takes place just right before that." Blake Neely, composer of Arrow and The Flash, composed the music for Vixen along with Nathaniel Blume. In January 2016, CW President Mark Pedowitz announced that The CW had renewed Vixen for a second season of six episodes, again totaling about a half-hour of content. Pedowitz also stated he regretted not airing the entire series as a half-hour special on The CW, something he hoped to do with season two. In January 2017, in terms of renewing Vixen for a third season, Pedowitz said, "We haven't had that discussion, but based on the success of [the second] season I have no reason why not to." The entire series made its broadcast debut on The CW on August 30, 2017.

== Home media ==
In February 2017, Warner Bros. announced Vixen: The Movie for release on digital download on May 8, 2017, and on Blu-ray and DVD on May 23, 2017. The release sees the first two seasons combined into a single story, with 15 minutes of never-before-seen content. Bonus features on the release include the Justice League Unlimited episodes "Hunter's Moon" and "Grudge Match" and a new featurette.

== Reception ==
Megalyn Echikunwoke as Vixen in Arrow.

IGN's Jesse Schedeen gave the series a 7.3/10, praising the action sequences, the animation and the tone, saying the series "finds its niche in the Flash/Arrow-verse". Schedeen criticized the short run time and the voice acting of some actors, particularly those crossing over from the live-action shows, saying "There's a certain stiffness and even slowness to Stephen Amell's Ollie, Grant Gustin's Barry and Carlos Valdes' Cisco that isn't present in live-action. This is especially apparent whenever the characters launch into witty banter with each other." Oliver Sava of The A.V. Club gave the series a "B+" rating.

In 2017, Vixen was nominated for the Golden Reel Award for Outstanding Achievement in Sound Editing – Computer Episodic (Webisode).

== Arrowverse ==
Guggenheim stated that if the series was successful, a live-action series centered on the character could be possible. Echikunwoke appeared as the character on Arrow during the fourth-season episode "Taken," in which Mari aided Oliver Queen and his team in rescuing his kidnapped son. After Vixen's appearance on Arrow, Pedowitz reiterated again that it would be possible for the character to spin out to her own live-action series, or potentially join the characters on Legends of Tomorrow. It was originally intended for Echikunwoke to reprise her role in the second season of Legends of Tomorrow, but she was unable to do so due to previous commitments. Maisie Richardson-Sellers was ultimately cast to portray Amaya Jiwe, the grandmother of McCabe who also operated as Vixen. Kuasa appears throughout the third season of Legends of Tomorrow, portrayed by Tracy Ifeachor, while Chuck McCabe appears in the episode "I, Ava" and is portrayed by Eli Gabay. The events of the season end up retroactively changing the continuity of Vixen, resulting in an altered timeline where Zambesi was never destroyed, and Mari shares the Vixen mantle with Kuasa.
