= The Secret Origin of Felicity Smoak =

- Arrow episode
- Emily Bett Rickards as a younger Felicity Smoak
- Episode no.: Season 3 Episode 5
- Directed by: Michael Schultz
- Written by: Ben Sokolowski; Brian Ford Sullivan
- Cinematography by: Gordon Verheul
- Editing by: Thomas Wallerstein
- Original air date: November 5, 2014

Guest appearances
- Brandon Routh as Ray Palmer (special guest star); J. R. Ramirez as Ted Grant; Charlotte Ross as Donna Smoak; Christina Cox as Celia Castle; Nolan Funk as Cooper Seldon; Matthew McLellan as Myron Forest

Episode chronology
← Previous "The Magician"	Next → "Guilty"
- Arrow season 3

"The Secret Origin of Felicity Smoak" is the fifth episode of the third season, and fifty-first overall episode, of the American television series Arrow, originally broadcast on The CW. Based on the DC Comics character Green Arrow, the series follows the story of billionaire vigilante Oliver Queen, portrayed by Canadian actor Stephen Amell, who returns home after five years supposedly stranded on a Pacific island, featuring flashback sequences to his time away. The series is part of the Arrowverse franchise, alongside spin-off shows The Flash, Legends of Tomorrow, Supergirl, Batwoman and other associated media. This episode is notable as the first Arrow episode to feature flashback sequences centered entirely on a character other than Oliver Queen, focusing instead on the backstory of the character Felicity Smoak, played by Emily Bett Rickards. The episode was written by co-producer Ben Sokolowski and Brian Ford Sullivan and directed by Michael Schultz. It premiered in the United States on The CW on November 5, 2014.

The episode flashbacks to the late 2000s, exploring Felicity's time as a rebellious goth and student at MIT alongside her then-boyfriend Cooper Seldon, portrayed by Nolan Gerard Funk, which has repercussions for her in the present day. It also features the first appearance of Charlotte Ross as Felicity's mother Donna Smoak and ends with the apparent revelation of the murderer of the character Sara Lance. The episode stars Stephen Amell as Oliver Queen alongside Emily Bett Rickards as Felicity Smoak with Katie Cassidy as Laurel Lance, David Ramsey as John Diggle, Willa Holland as Thea Queen, Colton Haynes as Roy Harper, John Barrowman as Malcolm Merlyn and Paul Blackthorne as Quentin Lance. Season three recurring stars Brandon Routh as Ray Palmer and J. R. Ramirez as Ted Grant also feature in the episode.

The episode was watched live by 2.73 million viewers on its first broadcast, achieving the fourth-highest ratings share of the show's third season. It was generally well received with critics' praising the performances of Rickards and Ross and the character development in the episode, but criticizing the more predictable elements of the plot. The episode holds a critics' approval rating of 100% on review aggregator site Rotten Tomatoes.

== Synopsis ==
In the late 2000s, Felicity Smoak is a student at the Massachusetts Institute of Technology (MIT). Styling herself as a dark-haired goth, she considers herself to be a hacktivist, alongside her then boyfriend Cooper Seldon and his roommate Myron Forrest. Felicity creates a computer virus that enables the trio to access government mainframes, but objects to Cooper's plan to wipe all records of student loans from the system. However, his attempt is tracked by the Federal Bureau of Investigation and he is arrested and later sentenced to jail. Following Cooper's apparent suicide, Felicity is shown to have changed her image, dying her hair blonde, and abandoning her goth style wardrobe.

Five years later, Felicity discovers that cyber-attacks by a group calling themselves 'Brother Eye' have been launched using the code she developed whilst at MIT. Felicity and her mother, Donna, are kidnapped by the group, revealed to be led by an alive and well Cooper, who admits his suicide was faked by the National Security Agency. Felicity agrees to help him hack into the Treasury Department when he threatens to hurt Donna, but manages to secretly contact Oliver Queen, who aids in rescuing the pair. The episode ends with Roy Harper waking from a nightmare in which he sees himself shooting Sara Lance, making him wonder if he is in fact her killer.

== Production ==
=== Development ===
Arrow was developed for television by Greg Berlanti, Andrew Kreisberg and Marc Guggenheim in 2012, and premiered on The CW in October of the same year. The series is loosely based on the DC Comics character Green Arrow, and would go on to be the progenitor of a franchise of television shows and other associated media based around adaptations of a variety of DC Comics characters, set within a shared universe, collectively known as the 'Arrowverse'.

Loosely based on the DC Comics character of the same name, Felicity Smoak was originally written as a one-off guest star for the first season Arrow episode, "Lone Gunmen". The success of the character led to actress Emily Bett Rickards being promoted to recurring status throughout season one and to the main cast from season two onwards. In 2014, during Arrow's second season, executive producer Marc Guggenheim discussed ways in which the writing staff had worked to develop a deeper back story for the character, promising that more of this would be seen on screen in both seasons two and three.

Interviewed at the San Diego Comic-Con Arrow panel in 2014, executive producer Andrew Kreisberg confirmed that the third season of the show would contain an episode centered around the character, exploring her history in more depth. He also stated that the episode would be entitled "Oracle", a nod to the DC Comics character of the same name. However, in an interview given in August of the same year Guggenheim revealed that the title had been changed to "The Secret Origin of Felicity Smoak".

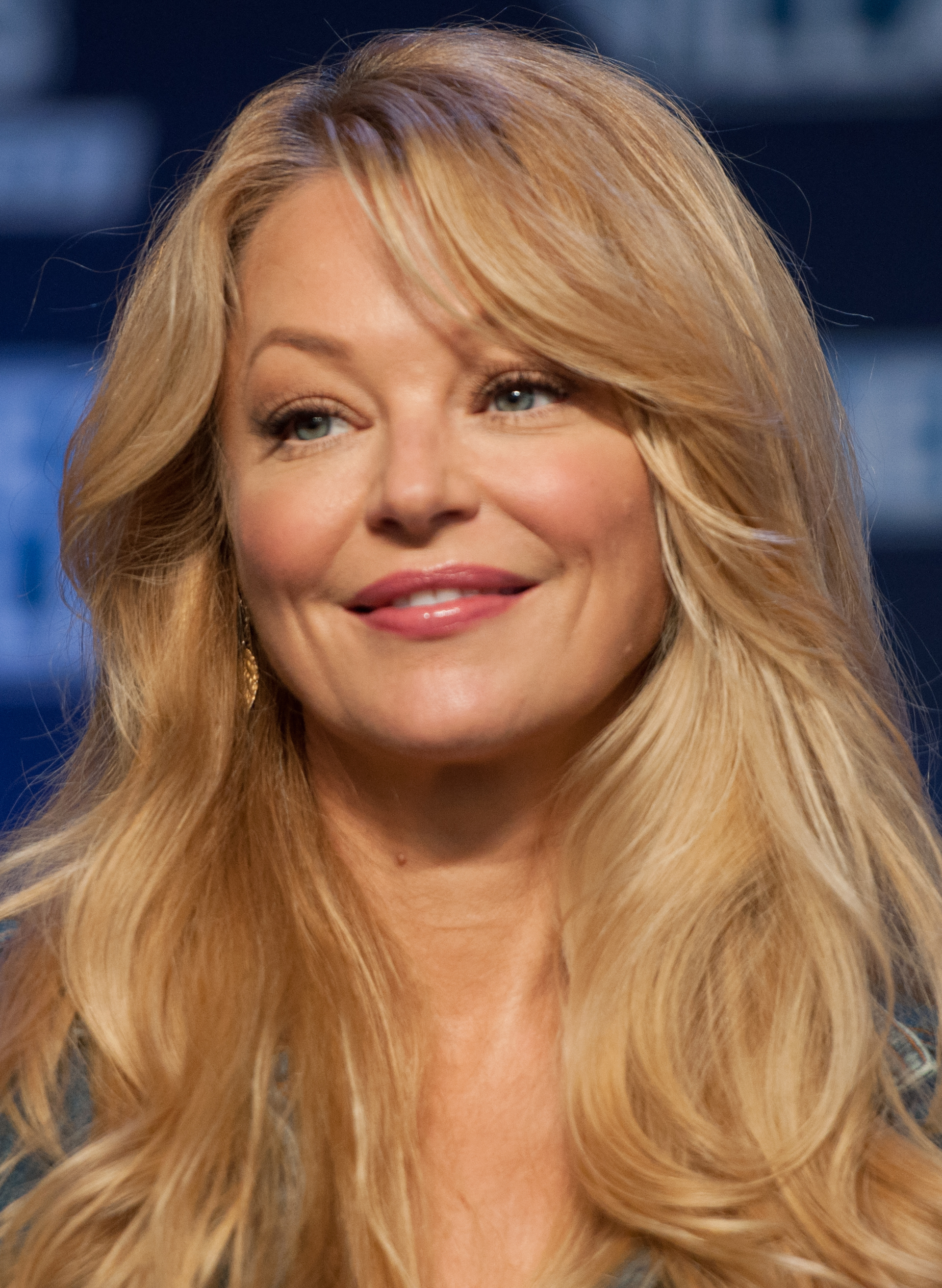
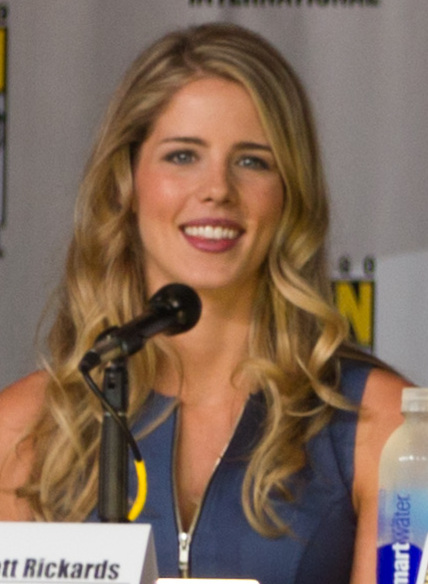
Charlotte Ross (left) and Emily Bett Rickards, who play mother and daughter Donna and Felicity Smoak respectively. The episode explores the pair's conflicted relationship.

=== Writing ===
Kreisberg confirmed that the episode would explore Felicity's time at MIT through the use of flashback sequences. Guggenheim stated prior to the episode that more would be revealed with regard to Felicity's family history, introducing her mother, Donna Smoak, and examining the way "she and Felicity are two very different people", as well as "extending the mystery" of who her father was. Speaking before the episode aired, Rickards noted in regard to the Felicity the audience is introduced to during the flashback sequences that "she's younger, she was finding herself but she was on the track where we see her now" and that the story of her past would reveal her "deep turmoil". Discussing the relationship with her mother, Rickards called it "a flaky one, but a loving one", and described how the events of the episode helped Felicity to gain a deeper understanding and appreciation of Donna.

The episode features several 'Easter egg' references to DC comics. Cooper's roommate is named Myron Forrest, a character who appeared in Jack Kirby's OMAC comic run published in the 1970s. In Kirby's story, the character is responsible for the creation of an advanced artificial intelligence named 'Brother Eye', which is the name given to Cooper's terrorist group in the episode. Lyla Michaels, an A.R.G.U.S. agent and John Diggle's ex-wife, is not present in the episode, but is stated to be in 'Santa Prisca', a fictional South American nation featured in DC comics. Discussing the younger Felicity's 'goth' persona, Rickards acknowledged that the costume design was 'a nod' to the character of Death in the Vertigo Comics series The Sandman.

=== Casting ===
The episode stars the main cast of Arrow's third season; Stephen Amell as Oliver Queen, Katie Cassidy as Laurel Lance, David Ramsey as John Diggle, Willa Holland as Thea Queen, Emily Bett Rickards as Felicity Smoak, Colton Haynes as Roy Harper, John Barrowman as Malcolm Merlyn and Paul Blackthorne as Quentin Lance. It also features the season's recurring stars J. R. Ramirez as Ted Grant and Brandon Routh as Ray Palmer, the latter being credited as 'special guest star'. The episode sees the introduction of Felicity's mother, Donna Smoak, with actress Charlotte Ross cast in the role in August 2014. Later in the same month, Nolan Gerard Funk was cast as Felicity's former boyfriend Cooper Seldon.

=== Filming ===
Filming for the episode took place between August 25 and September 4, 2014, in Vancouver, British Columbia, with exterior scenes set at MIT filmed on location outside Vancouver Public Library.

== Reception ==
=== Ratings ===
The episode was watched live by 2.73 million viewers, and had a ratings share of 1.1, the fourth highest share of the show's third season. In the United Kingdom it attracted 995,000 viewers for its premiere, making it the 3rd most watched program on Sky One for the week.

=== Critical response ===
On review aggregator website Rotten Tomatoes, the episode holds an approval rating of 100% based on 15 reviews, with an average rating of 7.6/10. The critics' consensus reads "Arrow finally has a Felicity-centric episode that – aside from being well-done – warrants attention because the flashbacks are finally about someone other than Oliver."

Jesse Schedeen of IGN rated the episode 7.5 out of 10 and noted that "this episode was definitely a great vehicle for Emily Bett Rickards to strut her stuff" and that "it was definitely a fun change of pace to see Felicity taking point in the conflict and using Ollie and friends as her muscle." Overall Schedeen welcomed the fact that the episode allowed Felicity to take centre stage and for the audience to see her interaction with both her mother and old boyfriend, but felt that "the plot was predictable and the final confrontation with Cooper disappointing". He did welcome the number of DC Comics cameos in the episode. Writing for Den of Geek, Mike Cecchini awarded the episode 3.5 out of 5 and also noted the number of DC-related Easter eggs present throughout. Whilst he felt that the episode could have gone wrong, he concluded that it successfully delivered on its promise.

"There are so many things that could have gone wrong with "The Secret Origin of Felicity Smoak." We could have gotten too bogged down in the past. Too much weight could have been given to some "dark secret" of Felicity's. These things didn't happen. What we got was a fun, charming episode of Arrow that still managed to not feel too lightweight."

— Critic Mike Cecchini reviewing the episode for Den of Geek

Kevin Fitzpatrick of ScreenCrush observed that both Felicity's "cartoonishly attractive mother" and Felicity's "stock "goth hacker" past at MIT" could have fallen short, but that they "end up much better in their execution than they might look on paper", although felt that the "villainy fell somewhat short". In particular he praised Charlotte Ross for the "surprising amount of depth" she bought to the character of Donna, and Rickards who he felt "gave just the right amount of vulnerability and determination in having both family and past sins pulling from either direction." He also noted that it was nice to "see that the character always had something of a heroically badass streak". Writing for Bustle, Kelly Schremph echoed similar sentiments, noting how it was "nice to see yet another one of Arrow's female characters really come into her own and take control of her life rather than letting a man do it for her" and to see the character of Felicity proving "that she's way more than just a genius hacker. She's also a hero."

Digital Spy's Morgan Jeffrey praised Rickards' performance and described the episode as "a thank you from the Arrow writing staff to Rickards for everything that she's gifted this show". Whilst he felt that the episode was weak on plot, he praised writers Sokolowski and Ford Sullivan for the effective character development in their script. Alan Sepinwall of Uproxx also considered the plot's twists "well telegraphed", as well as noting that the action sequence was one of the weaker of the series, but felt overall that the episode was "so satisfying despite that because of the character work promised by that title." He also praised Rickards performance, noting that the episode was recognition of "how talented and appealing Emily Bett Rickards is". Writing for Paste Magazine, Mark Rozeman felt that elements of the plot were formulaic, but that Felicity's relationships "as trope-heavy as they may be, make for a fun, breezy hour of TV". He praised the writers for making "a Felicity-heavy installment without it feeling like blatant fan pandering", and stated that "overall the episode does succeed at touching upon multiple layers to the character", calling Felicity "one of the best characters on TV". Carissa Pavlica of TV Fanatic gave the episode 3.7 out of 5. She welcomed the opportunity to reveal Felicity's backstory, and in particular praised both the character of Donna and Ross's performance, but felt that overall it failed to deliver on the anticipation inspired by the title, and that Felicity's story in the episode was overshadowed by the final reveal.

In his recap for Collider, David Trumbore awarded the episode a B rating, describing it as "a nice, fun, diversionary episode", and praising the deepening of the performance of Stephen Amell. Recapping the episode, for Entertainment Weekly Chancellor Agard described Rickards as "absolutely killing it". He also included the episode in his list of Rickards "10 Best Episodes" across the series as a whole, describing it as one of her best performances, and praising her "comically exasperated performance" in response to Charlotte Ross' Donna.
