= Ben Sokolowski =

Canadian television writer

- Born: Benjamin Sokolowski
- Education: University of Southern California (BFA)
- Occupation: Television writer
- Years active: 2006–present

Benjamin "Ben" Sokolowski is a Canadian television writer.

He is well known for his work on The CW superhero series Arrow and The Flash.

== Career ==
=== Television and film ===
He began his career as a production staffer on the J. J. Abrams produced ABC dramedy What About Brian. He would later go on to work with Abrams a second time on the 2008 science-fiction feature Cloverfield, as a production assistant.

In 2011, he was hired as a story editor on CTV's The Listener. He went on to script one episode, "Lady in the Lake".

He has written for the NBC horror series Fear Itself and the French Canadian action/drama Transporter: The Series.

In 2021, he wrote the episode "Quatervois" for The Walking Dead: World Beyond. In 2022, he wrote the episode "Evie / Joe" for Tales of the Walking Dead.

==== Arrow and The Flash ====
In summer 2012, Sokolowski joined the freshman season of the DC Comics produced CW series Arrow, as a writer. He was then promoted to executive story editor, during the second season. With the commencement of season three, Sokolowski was promoted to co-producer; and at the start of production for the show's fourth season he was named producer, along with Keto Shimizu. Episodes he has contributed to include:

- "Damaged" (1.05) (co-written by co-producer Wendy Mericle)
- "Burned" (1.10) (co-written by co-executive producer Moira Kirland)
- "Vertigo" (1.12) (co-written with Mericle)
- "Home Invasion" (1.21) (co-written with Beth Schwartz)
- "Identity" (2.02) (co-written by Schwartz)
- "Keep Your Enemies Closer" (2.06) (co-written with Schwartz)
- "Three Ghosts" (2.09) (Sokolowski and DC Comics CCO Geoff Johns wrote a teleplay, based on a story by executive producers Andrew Kreisberg and Greg Berlanti)
- "The Promise" (2.15) (co-written by supervising producer Jake Coburn)
- "Streets of Fire" (2.22) (co-written by Coburn)
- "The Secret Origin of Felicity Smoak" (3.05) (co-written with Brian Ford Sullivan)
- "Midnight City" (3.11) (co-written with co-executive producer Mericle)
- "Nanda Parbat" (3.15) (Sokolowski and co-executive producer Erik Oleson co-wrote a teleplay, based on a story by Mericle and Sokolowski)
- "Broken Arrow" (3.19) (Sokolowski and Sullivan co-wrote a teleplay, based on a story by co-executive producer Coburn)
- "This Is Your Sword" (3.22) (Sullivan and Sokolowski co-wrote a teleplay, based on a story from Oleson)
- "Beyond Redemption" (4.04) (co-written by co-producer Schwartz)
- "Beacon of Hope" (4.17) (co-written with Brian Ford Sullivan)
- "A Matter of Trust" (5.03) (co-written with Emilio Ortega Aldrich)
- "Vigilante" (5.07) (co-written with Emilio Ortega Aldrich)
- "Who Are You?" (5.10) (co-written with Brian Ford Sullivan
- "Fighting Fire With Fire" (5.15) (co-written with Speed Weed)
- "Deathstroke Returns" (6.05) (co-written with Spiro Skentzos)
- "Crisis on Earth-X Part 2 (6.08) Sokolowski and Mericle co-wrote a teleplay, based on a story by co-executive producers Andrew Kreisberg and Marc Guggenheim)

During the first season of Arrow's sister-series The Flash, Sokolowski crossed over to co-pen two episodes. With the commencement of the sophomore year, he was promoted to consulting producer. Installments he has contributed to include:

- "Flash vs. Arrow" (1.08) (Brooke Eikmeier and Sokolowski co-wrote a teleplay, based on a story from executive producers Kreisberg and Berlanti)
- "Fallout" (1.14) (co-written with Shimizu)
- "The Darkness and the Light" (2.05) (co-penned by executive story editor Grainne Godfree)

=== Comics ===
It was announced in July 2014, that he, along with Arrow and The Flash co-creator Andrew Kreisberg, would take over writing for the Green Arrow New 52 comic book series in October of that year. Their tenure commenced with issue #35.
