= The Futon Critic =

American television website

- Available in: English
- Headquarters: United States
- Owner: Futon Media
- Creator: Brian Ford Sullivan
- Website: thefutoncritic.com
- Registration: Optional
- Launched: January 14, 1997; 29 years ago
- Current status: Active

The Futon Critic is a website that provides articles and information regarding prime time programming on broadcast and cable networks in the United States. The site publishes press releases provided by television networks and streaming television platforms. It previously published reviews of prime time programming and interviews of people in the television industry, as well as republished Nielsen ratings data reports. The Futon Critic was founded by Brian Ford Sullivan in 1997.

== History ==
Brian Ford Sullivan, CEO of Futon Media, registered The Futon Critic on January 14, 1997. In its founding, the site published reviews on prime time programming, as well as interviews its staff conducted with members of the television industry. The site also contains sections of articles dedicated to republishing press releases, network schedules and previously Nielsen ratings data, which have been cited by articles on websites such as The Huffington Post and TV by the Numbers. Its publications of Nielsen ratings data have also been used as a resource by institutions such as the University of Colorado Boulder and Temple University.

In 2009, Sullivan appeared on WGN's The Nick Digilio Show to discuss television and the Emmy nominations of the year on behalf of the site. In 2010, Sullivan announced a new section of their site dedicated to tracking the availability of programming on digital distribution platforms, to be launched in August of the same year. He also announced the production of a television pilot to be released onto the section sometime after its launch; entitled .comEDY, it was pitched as a comedic look at the effects of the dot-com bubble burst around Silicon Valley.

The site ceased publishing original reviews and interviews in early 2013. As of 2024, the site no longer posts significant original content, but continues to be updated regularly with press releases from various media outlets, development updates, and seasonal program listings.
