= Deathbolt =

DC Comics supervillain

- Deathbolt as depicted in Who's Who: The Definitive Directory of the DC Universe #6 (August 1985). Art by Jerry Ordway.

Publication information
- Publisher: DC Comics
- First appearance: All-Star Squadron #21 (May 1983)
- Created by: Roy Thomas and Jerry Ordway

In-story information
- Alter ego: Jake Simmons
- Species: Metahuman
- Abilities: Electrokinesis; able to generate, project, channel and absorb electrical currents

Deathbolt (Jake Simmons) is a supervillain appearing in American comic books published by DC Comics. He was created by the Ultra-Humanite to fight the All-Star Squadron.

Deathbolt appeared in the Arrowverse series Arrow and The Flash, portrayed by Doug Jones.

== Fictional character biography ==
Wanted for murder, Jake Simmons fled police in a stolen biplane during a heavy storm. He crashed when lightning struck the plane over Meteor Crater, Arizona. The Ultra-Humanite found him and experimented on him until his body became a living electrical battery. Code-named "Deathbolt", he became the Ultra-Humanite's staunch ally until his defeat by the All-Star Squadron.

Deathbolt returns and attempts to kill Starman, only to be defeated by his descendant Farris Knight.

== Powers and abilities ==
Deathbolt can channel the electrical energy in his body into powerful blasts of electricity.

== In other media ==
Deathbolt appears in series set in the Arrowverse, portrayed by Doug Jones.

- Introduced in the Arrow episode "Broken Arrow", this version can manipulate plasma instead of electricity.
- Deathbolt appears in The Flash episode "Rogue Air". Having been defeated by the Atom and transferred to S.T.A.R. Labs' custody, the Flash and his allies attempt to transfer Deathbolt to a new prison. However, Deathbolt is killed by Captain Cold, who he claims owed him money.
