= Oscar Balderrama =

American television writer and script coordinator

- Other name: Oscar Balderrama Jr.
- Occupations: Television writer and script coordinator
- Years active: 2002–present

Oscar Balderrama is an American television writer and script coordinator.

He is well known for his work on the ABC legal drama Eli Stone and for The CW superhero series Arrow.

== Career ==
His first job in the industry was as an intern on Greg Berlanti's Everwood, in 2002–2003. He would go on to become a production assistant and then assistant to the producers for The WB series.

He then joined the ABC family drama Brothers & Sisters, as script coordinator, for six episodes during the first season. He worked on the pilot for the 2007 series Dirty Sexy Money, as a production staffer.

Balderrama went on to join another drama created by Berlanti, ABC's Jonny Lee Miller starrer Eli Stone, as script coordinator. He later co-scripted two episodes ("Waiting for That Day" and season two's "Flight Path").

In 2012, he moved to the FOX series The Mob Doctor; then, following its cancellation, boarded Lifetime's Drop Dead Diva. Working as script coordinator and script supervisor, respectively.

=== Arrow ===
Balderrama has served as the script coordinator on the Green Arrow origin series Arrow, since the pilot episode. He made his writing debut on the show with the third season installment, "The Fallen", co-penning the hour with co-executive producer Wendy Mericle.

He, along with Arrow: Blood Rush writer Lauren Certo, will co-write Arrow's first tie-in novel, "Vengeance", due in 2016.

Balderrama's first credit for the series' fourth season was with the fifth episode, "Haunted", co-written by executive story editor Brian Ford Sullivan. It featured an anticipated appearance by DC Comics antihero John Constantine (Matt Ryan), from the cancelled NBC series. Balderrama will next co-script the first episode of 2016, "Blood Debts", with staff writer Sarah Tarkoff; helmed by Jesse Warn.
