= Brian Ford Sullivan =

American television writer

- Born: United States
- Other names: Brian Ford
- Occupation: Television writer
- Years active: 1994 - present

Brian Ford Sullivan is an American television writer.

He is known for his work on The CW superhero series Arrow.

== Life and career ==
He grew up, for the most part, in Chicago, Illinois.

Sullivan founded the U.S. TV listing website The Futon Critic in January 1997. Sullivan's first foray into show business was with the original web series .comEDY, which he created for The Futon Critic.

He participated in the 2014 Warner Bros. Writers Workshop.

=== Arrow and Vixen ===
In summer 2014, Ford Sullivan was hired as a writer on The CW Green Arrow origin series Arrow. His first script contribution was co-writing, with co-producer Ben Sokolowski, the third-season episode "The Secret Origin of Felicity Smoak". It was the first episode to feature flashbacks of the titular techie. He next co-penned the season's twelfth episode "Uprising", with executive story editor Beth Schwartz. It revealed the evil origins of The Dark Archer/Malcolm Merlyn. The two re-teamed for the 16th episode, "The Offer". Sullivan and Sokolowski co-wrote a teleplay, based on a story by co-executive producer Jake Coburn for the nineteenth installment, "Broken Arrow"; which saw the departure of series regular Colton Haynes (Roy Harper / Arsenal). He co-wrote the teleplay for "Al Sah-him" with Emilio Ortega Aldrich, that Schwartz wrote the story for; and lastly he co-wrote, with Sokolowski, the teleplay for the 22nd episode, "This Is Your Sword", with co-executive producer Erik Oleson providing the story.

During the 2015 Winter Television Critics Association tour, The CW announced a new 6-part animated series, Vixen, centered on the DC heroine, that premiered in August of the year. It shares the same universe as Arrow and sister-series The Flash. The series is written by Keto Shimizu, Sullivan, Arrow showrunner Wendy Mericle, and comic book writer Lauren Certo.

At the start of season four of Arrow, Sullivan was named an executive story editor. He first co-penned, along with script coordinator Oscar Balderrama, the fifth episode, "Haunted". It featured an anticipated guest appearance by John Constantine (Matt Ryan), from the canceled NBC series. Sullivan co-wrote the season's ninth episode, "Legends of Yesterday".
