= Speed Weed =

American television writer and producer

- Born: William Henry Weed
- Occupations: Television writer, producer
- Years active: 2004–present

William Henry Weed, better known by the professional name Speed Weed, is an American television writer and producer. He has written and produced on series including NCIS: Los Angeles, Law & Order: Special Victims Unit, Political Animals, Haven, and Arrow; more recently he served as a co–executive producer on Netflix's Fate: The Winx Saga and contributed a teleplay to Amazon's The Summer I Turned Pretty. In 2021, he was announced as co-showrunner and executive producer of TNT's planned series based on the Liam Neeson film Unknown.

== Early life and education ==
Weed is a graduate of Yale University (Class of 1993). According to a 2020 Yale Alumni Association event page, prior to working in television he worked as a playwright, science journalist, school teacher, and advance man for President Bill Clinton.

== Career ==
Weed's early television credits include the TNT medical drama Saved (2006), the Fox crime fantasy New Amsterdam (as a story editor in 2008), and CBS's science-based procedural Eleventh Hour (2008–09).

In 2009 he joined NCIS: Los Angeles as an executive story editor and writer. His first produced episode, "Random on Purpose" (Season 1, Episode 9), is credited to Weed. He also discussed his NCIS:LA work and the show's steampunk-inspired sequence in a contemporaneous Tor.com/Reactormag interview.

Weed moved to Law & Order: Special Victims Unit for the 2010–11 season as a co-producer and writer. His episode "Mask" (Season 12, Episode 13) is credited to him as writer; showrunner Neal Baer later discussed the hour and Weed's script in a retrospective interview.

In 2012, Weed served as a producer on Greg Berlanti's USA Network limited series Political Animals and co-wrote the episode "Lost Boys."

From 2013 to 2015 he wrote on Syfy's Stephen King–inspired drama Haven. Episodes credited to Weed include "Much Ado About Mara" (2014) and "Morbidity" (2014), among others.

Weed joined The CW's Arrow in 2015 as a co-executive producer and writer. His credits on the series include "Restoration" (with Wendy Mericle) and later episodes such as "Fundamentals" (2018). Additional Arrow writing credits for Weed include "Fighting Fire with Fire" and "Dangerous Liaisons" (both 2017), and "Missing" (2017).

In 2021, Weed was a co–executive producer on Netflix's Fate: The Winx Saga (Season 1). The same year, WarnerMedia announced Unknown (wt), a series in development at TNT based on the 2011 film, with Weed and Karl Gajdusek set as showrunners and executive producers.

In 2022, Weed received a teleplay credit on The Summer I Turned Pretty (Episode "Summer Heat").

== Selected writing credits ==
- NCIS: Los Angeles — "Random on Purpose" (S1E9, 2009)
- Law & Order: Special Victims Unit — "Mask" (S12E13, 2011)
- Political Animals — "Lost Boys" (2012)
- Haven — "Much Ado About Mara" (2014)
- Arrow — "Restoration" (2015), "Fundamentals" (2018), among others

== Personal life ==
As of 2020, the Yale Alumni Association noted Weed lived in South Pasadena with his wife and triplet daughters.
