= Jesse Warn =

American television director

- Occupations: Television director; film director; screenwriter
- Years active: 1999–present

Jesse Warn is an American television director, film director, and screenwriter. He is known for his work on the Starz drama Spartacus and for The CW's The Originals, Arrow, The Flash and Supergirl. Warn also directed and made his screenwriting debut in the film Nemesis Game.

== Career ==
He began his career writing and directing the 1999 short film 9 Across, starring Rena Owen. In 2000, he wrote and directed his second short film, Little Samurai. He then segued to television work, directing for series such as, Legend of the Seeker, V, Criminal Minds, The Vampire Diaries, The Originals and True Blood.

Having had directed the first installment of the Starz mini-series Spartacus: Gods of the Arena, "Past Transgressions", Warn was hired as a director for the sequel series Spartacus: War of the Damned. He ultimately directed eight episodes ("The Thing in the Pit", "Great and Unfortunate Things", "Kill Them All", "A Place in This World", "Sacramentum", "Wrath of the Gods", "Wolves at the Gate", "Mors Indecepta").

In winter 2014, Warn directed his first episode of the DC Comics produced Green Arrow origin series Arrow, which was episode 19, of season 2, "The Man Under the Hood", and featured characters crossing over from the series' impending spin-off, The Flash. Warn directed the third episode of The Flash's first season, "Things You Can't Outrun", which featured the introduction of future superhero Ronnie Raymond.

He directed the 8th episode of Arrow's 3rd season, "The Brave and the Bold", which again featured a crossover event with The Flash. It also introduced the supervillain Digger Harkness/Captain Boomerang. His next episode was with the season's twelfth, "Uprising". It explored the motivations and genesis of The Dark Archer/Malcolm Merlyn. He directed the 17th installment of the year, "Suicidal Tendencies", from a script by co-producer Keto Shimizu. It saw the reformation of Task Force X, with new member Cupid/Carrie Cutter; and explored the past of Deadshot.

in 2023 Warn executive produced and directed for the NBC series, The Irrational.
