= Erik Oleson =

American television writer and producer

- Occupations: Television writer, producer
- Years active: 2002 - present

Erik Oleson is an American television writer and producer. He is best known for being the showrunner and executive producer of the second season of Amazon Prime Video's Carnival Row, and the critically acclaimed third and final season of Marvel's Daredevil on Netflix.

He also served as Head Writer and Executive Producer of the second season of Amazon's original series The Man in the High Castle, which garnered Oleson a USC Scripter Award Nomination in 2017.

== Early life ==
Oleson grew up in Clifton, Virginia and is the son of Peter C. Oleson, a former assistant director of the Defense Intelligence Agency. Growing up the son of an intelligence official had a profound impact on the types of stories Oleson would go on to write.

Oleson got his first real break at age 13, when James L. Brooks' Broadcast News filmed on location in his Virginia hometown. He snuck onto the set and the crew, taken by his enthusiasm for filmmaking, made him a set mascot. Oleson then went on to work on the production crews of numerous feature films as well as being a working commercials director while attending the film program at New York University Tisch School of the Arts, from which he graduated in 1995.

== Career ==
Prior to breaking in as a writer, Oleson was a professional reader for luminaries including Kathleen Kennedy, Chris Columbus and Jeffrey Katzenberg.

His first writing credit was on the Canadian/American drama Andromeda. Oleson went on to write for such series as The Agency, Jack & Bobby, E-Ring, Kings, Chase, The Mob Doctor, Crisis, Unforgettable, Arrow, and The Man in the High Castle.

=== Daredevil ===
In October 2017, it was reported that Oleson would serve as the showrunner for season 3 of Daredevil. The review aggregator website Rotten Tomatoes reported a 97% approval rating based on 65 reviews, with an average rating of 8.10/10.

Oleson was working on the show's fourth season before its abrupt cancellation.

=== Carnival Row ===
In October 2019, it was announced that Oleson would be stepping in as showrunner and executive producer of the second season of Carnival Row, set to premiere on Amazon Prime Video February 17, 2023.

=== CrimeThink ===
In March 2022, Deadline Hollywood announced that Oleson launched his own production company, CrimeThink, with executive Paul Shapiro serving as Head of Content for the company.
