= Wendy Mericle =

American television writer and producer

- Occupation(s): Writer, producer
- Years active: 2001 - present

Wendy Mericle is an American television writer and producer. She is known for her work on the ABC dramedy Desperate Housewives and The CW's superhero series Arrow.

== Life and career ==
From the age of seven on, Mericle grew up without a television, despite going on to become a television writer, executive producer and showrunner. She stated, "It is a very strange thing to be able to say to people I've never seen an entire episode of The Cosby Show, or that I have no idea [what they mean] when they make jokes about Family Ties. There's no baseline for me. But I do have a strong background in literature, in film, and that has served me well."

Her career began on The WB's Grosse Pointe, as assistant to executive producer Robin Schiff. She then went on to write for the drama series Everwood, where she first worked with creator Greg Berlanti. She would go on to work on the series Jack & Bobby and Eli Stone, where she served as writer and story editor on the latter. She held positions on The WB/The CW's Smallville, CBS' Ghost Whisperer, and the ABC paranormal/dramedy Eastwick.

In December 2014, Mericle sold her first project to FOX. The series would revolve around advanced female U.S. soldiers competing for a placement in the male-dominated Navy SEALs. The project was executive produced by Basil Iwanyk, for his studio Thunder Road, and Warner Bros. Ultimately it was not ordered to pilot.

In 2011, Mericle joined the ABC comedy series Desperate Housewives' eighth and final season, as an executive story editor. She later became a co-producer and writer of two episodes ("What's to Discuss, Old Friend" and "Lost My Power").

The stories that I like to break are the ones that have very strong emotional underpinnings. One of the things that I wanted to do when I came on the show in an Executive Producer capacity was to make sure that the emotional storylines were really there, and I wanted to bring them to the fore and to explore the relationships in equal parts to the action.

—Mericle on her writing method for Arrow.

Mericle boarded the DC Comics produced CW series Arrow, as writer and producer. Marking her fourth collaboration with co-creator Greg Berlanti. She was promoted to co-executive producer with the start of the third season. In April 2015, it was announced Mericle would be promoted to co-showrunner for the series' fourth season, alongside Marc Guggenheim, a role Mericle stepped down from at the end of season six.

She has stated that her favorite character to write for is John Diggle, saying, "I like that he's a strong voice with a strong point of view, and one that I think I agree with in a lot of ways. He also served in the military and has a very interesting world view I find intriguing. I like writing to that."

In April 2018 it was announced that Mericle had signed a development deal with ABC Studios where she will develop new projects and work with the studio's Head of Drama Development, Nne Ebong.
