= Kimberly Arcand =

American science communicator and data visualizer

Kimberly Kowal Arcand
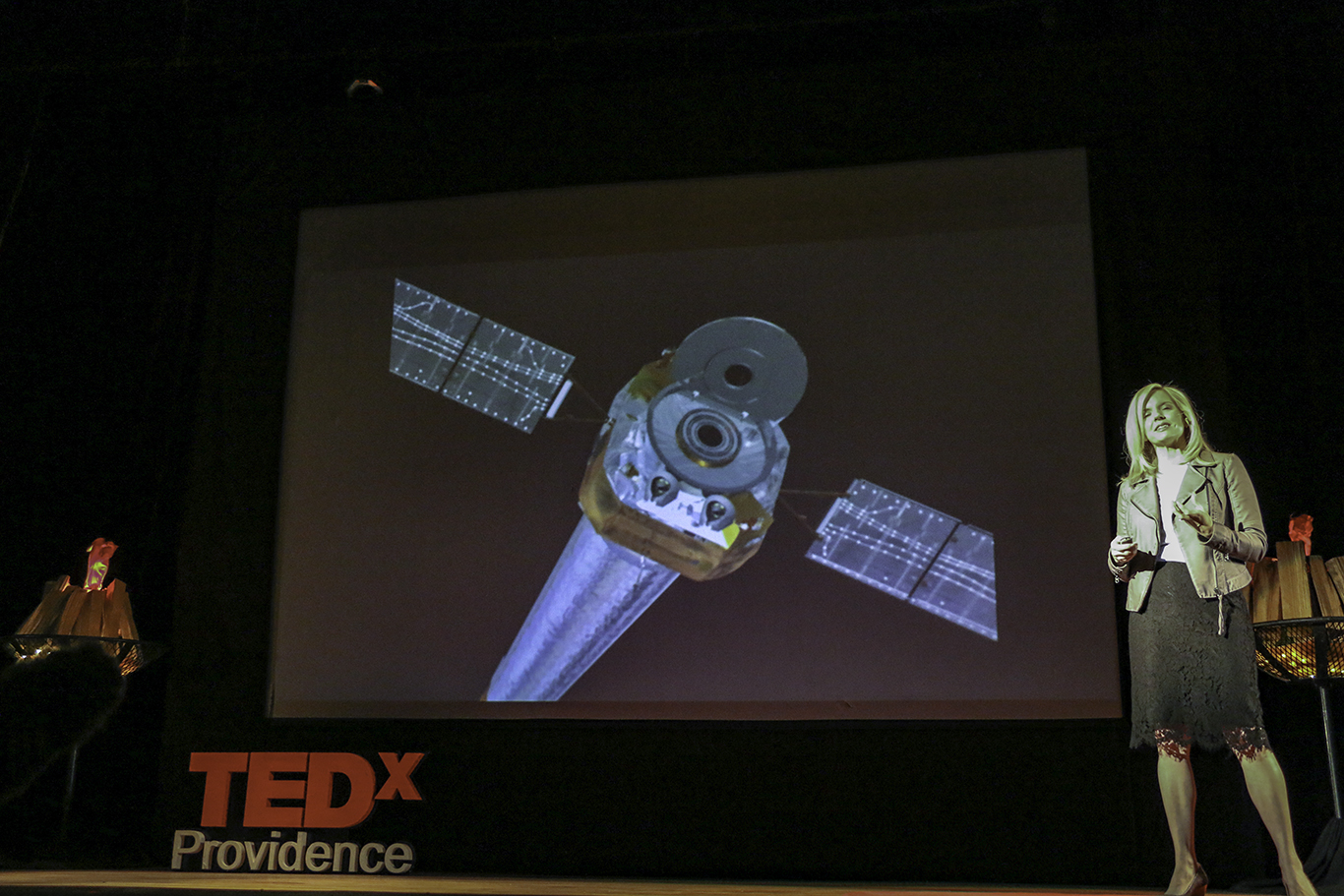
- TEDxProvidence, Rhode Island "How to Hold a Dead Star in Your Hand"
- Born: December 20, 1975 (age 50); Warwick, Rhode Island, U.S.
- Education: University of Rhode Island; Brown University; Harvard University; University of Otago
- Spouse: John L. Arcand
- Children: 2
- Scientific career
- Fields: Data visualization Science communication
- Workplaces: Smithsonian Astrophysical Observatory
- Thesis: Putting the stars within reach: NASA 3D data-based models in 3D print and virtual reality applications, and their potential effects on improving spatial reasoning skills and STEM interest in underrepresented groups of young female learners (2020)
- Doctoral advisor: Lisa F. Smith
- Website: www.kimarcand.com

Kimberly Kowal Arcand (born December 20, 1975) is a data visualizer and science communicator for NASA's Chandra X-ray Observatory. She is also the visualization coordinator for the Aesthetics and Astronomy image response project at the Center for Astrophysics | Harvard & Smithsonian located in Cambridge, Massachusetts.

== Early life and education ==
As a child, Arcand wanted to be an astronaut. She studied molecular biology at the University of Rhode Island and also became a developer for the University of Rhode Island Center for Vector-Borne Disease Public Health project. She was awarded a fellowship with the Rhode Island Public Health Partnership to work on Lyme disease. Arcand studied briefly at the Harvard University Computer Science Department between 2000 and 2002. In 2013 Arcand earned a Master's degree in Public Humanities from Brown University, focusing on image and meaning research. In 2020, Arcand completed her doctorate at the University of Otago in visualization science, under the supervision of Lisa Smith. She worked in the University of Rhode Island Department of Computer Science as an instructor between 1997 and 1999. She joined the Smithsonian Astrophysical Observatory and Chandra X-ray Observatory in 1998.

== Career ==
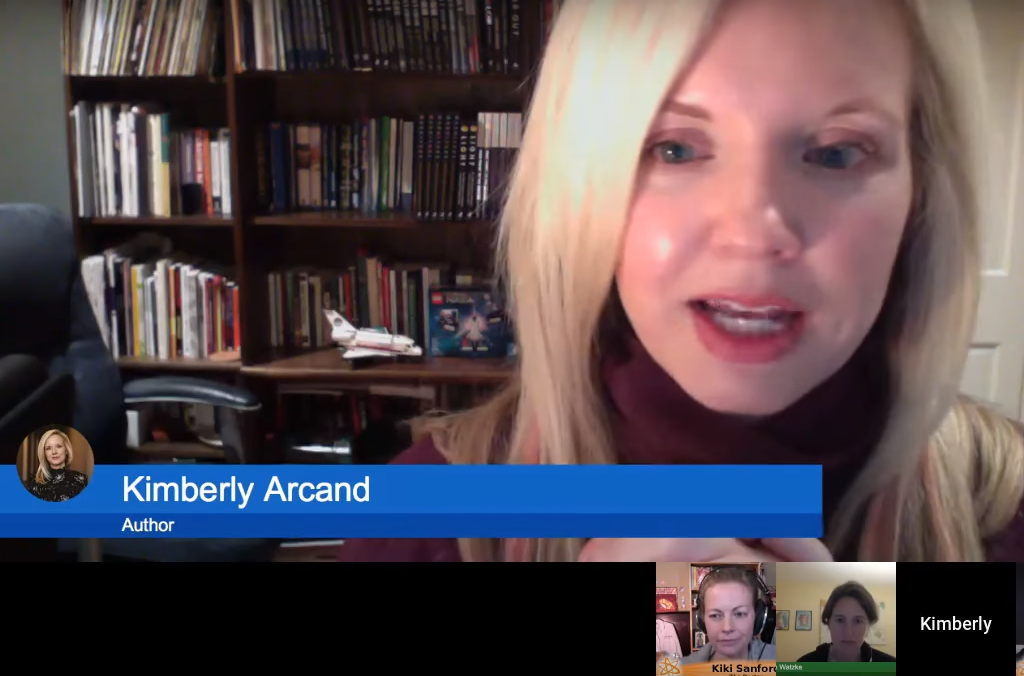
Arcand on This Week in Science in 2016 with Megan Watzke hosted by Kiki Sanford

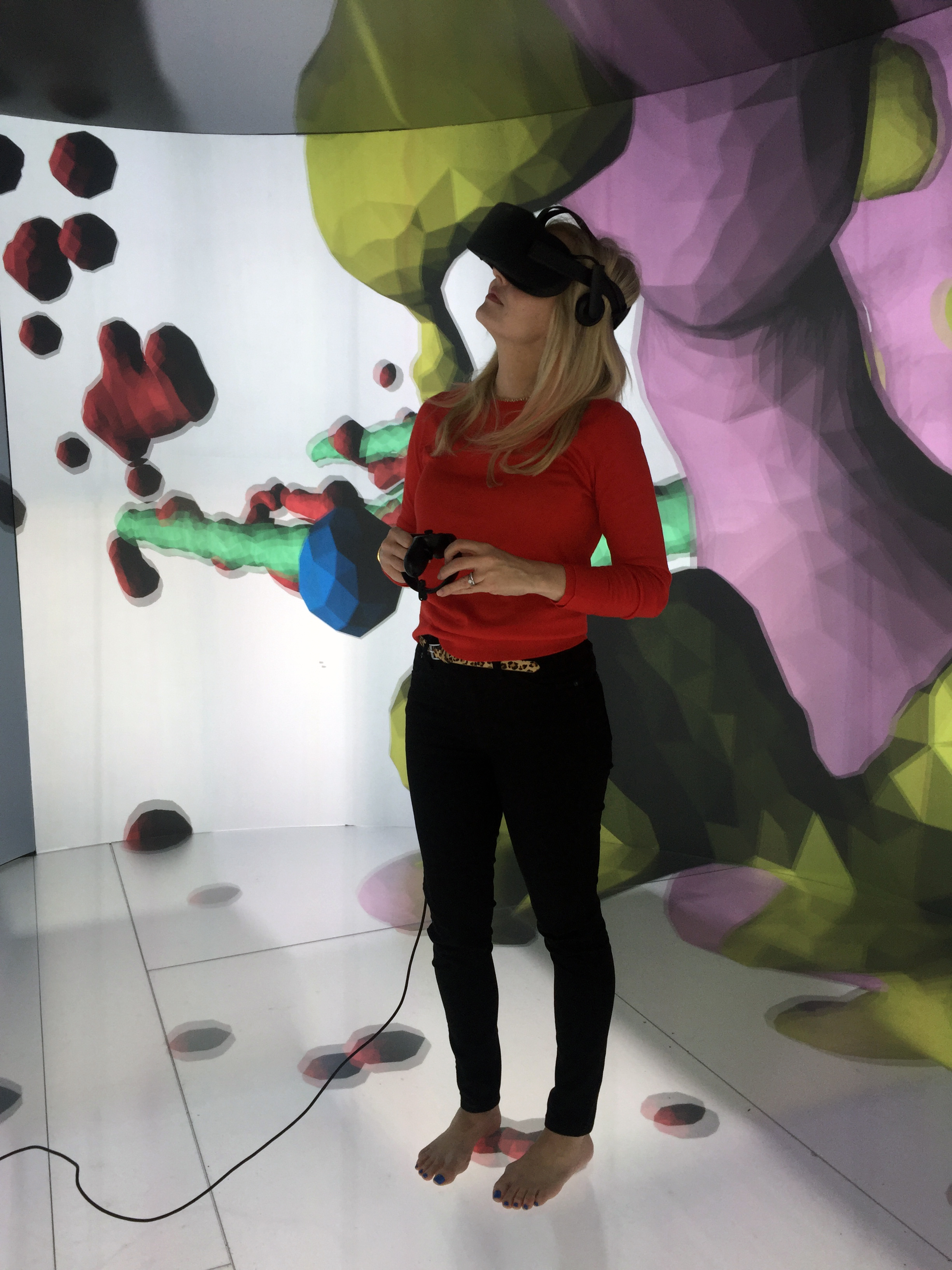
Arcand inside Brown University YURT, or VR CAVE, during testing of the headset and application.

Kim Arcand, Visualization and Emerging Technology Lead for NASA's Flagship Chandra X-ray Observatory, joins Todd Stewart and Bob Calise of Subjectmatterx.com to discuss the mysteries of the universe

In 2009 Arcand launched From Earth to the Universe with UNESCO. She is the visualization coordinator of the Aesthetics and Astronomy image response project at the Center for Astrophysics | Harvard & Smithsonian. The project launched in 2010 and looks at variations in the presentation of color and scale in astronomical images. The team also studies how people respond to images, and the misconceptions that non-experts have when they view them. The project began when Randall, Jeffrey, and Lisa F. Smith realized that the art would provide astrophysicists a more effective way in conveying the results to a much larger audience. The group explored the public perception of astronomical pictures using a survey linked to the NASA Astronomical Picture of the Day site.

She worked closely with UNESCO to celebrate the International Year of Light, an open-source exhibition that showcased science based on light. The celebration was supported by SPIE. Using NASA data, Arcand developed a way to 3D print a supernova remnant.

In 2016 the White House selected Arcand as a changemaker at the United State of Women Summit. where she wrote about the event for HuffPost. In 2017 Vinita Marwaha Madill's profiled her on Rocket Women. Arcand also serves on the boards of Rhode Island Museum of Science and Art (RIMOSA). and Rhode Island's Tech Collective. In 2019, Arcand collaborated with the Smithsonian Institution to launch the "Journey through an Exploded Star" 3-D Interactive Experience website.

=== Honors and awards ===
Arcand has won several awards for her work from NASA and the Smithsonian Institution.

- 2007 Pirelli International Award for science communication
- 2010 International Year of Astronomy Mani Bhaumik Prize for Excellence in Astronomy Education and Public Outreach
- 2014 Tech Collective Tech 10
- 2016 Smithsonian Institution Achievement Award

== Publications ==
=== Authored and co-authored ===
Arcand has written several popular science books. Her book Colouring the Universe was selected by Cosmos as one of the Top Illustrated Science Books of 2016. She collaborates with Megan Watzke and Travis Rector, Ph.D. Her book Light: The Visible Spectrum and Beyond was selected by Forbes as one of the Top 10 Gifts of 2016.

- 2022 Stars in Your Hand: A Guide to 3D Printing the Cosmos (with Megan Watzke)
- 2020 Goodnight Exomoon (Smithsonian Kids Storybook) Authored
- 2020 An Alien Helped Me with My Homework (with Lisa Smith)
- 2019 Light from the Void: Twenty Years of Discovery with NASA's Chandra X-ray Observatory (with Grant Tremblay, Megan Watzke, Martin C. Weisskopf and Belinda J. Wilkes)
- 2017 Magnitude: The Scale of the Universe (with Megan Watzke)
- 2015 Colouring the Universe: An Insider's Guide to Making Spectacular Images of Space (with Travis Rector and Megan Watzke )
- 2015 Light: The Visible Spectrum and Beyond (with Megan Watzke)
- 2013 Your Ticket to the Universe: A Guide To Exploring the Cosmos (with Megan Watzke)

=== Selected academic works ===
- Arcand, K. K.; Jiang, E.; Price, S.; Watzke, M.; Sgouros, T.; Edmonds, P. (12/2018). Walking Through an Exploded Star: Rendering Supernova Remnant Cassiopeia A into Virtual Reality. CAP Journal Issue 24 (2018): 17 arXiv:1812.06237
- Arcand, K. K.; Jiang, E.; Price, S.; Watzke, M.; Sgouros, T.; Edmonds, P. (10/2018). Walking Through an Exploded Star: Rendering Supernova Remnant Cassiopeia A into Virtual Reality. CAP Journal, Issue 24, p. 17, Bibcode 2018CAPJ...24...17A
- Lisa F. Smith, Kimberly K. Arcand, Randall K. Smith, Jay Bookbinder and Jeffrey K. Smith. (November 21, 2017 ). Capturing the many faces of an exploded star: communicating complex and evolving astronomical data Bibcode 2018CAPJ...24...17A doi 10.22323/2.16050202
- Arcand, K.; Megan, W.; DePasquale, J.; Jubett, A.; Edmonds, P.; DiVona, K. (09/2017). Communicating Astronomy with the Public Journal, Volume 22, p. 14 Bibcode 2017CAPJ...22...14A
- Arcand K., Watzke, M., DePasquale, J., Edmonds, P., *Bringing Cosmic Objects Down to Earth: An Overview of 3D Modelling and Printing in Astronomy and Astronomy Communication* Issue 22, p. 14.
- Arcand K., Watzke, M. (09/2017) "Pioneering Paths to the Universe" PanEuropean Networks: Science & Technology, issue 24, p128.
- Rector, T., Levay, Z., Frattare, L., Arcand, K.K., Watzke, M. (03/ 2017) "The Aesthetics of Astrophysics: How to Make Appealing Color-Composite Images that Convey the Science" Publications of the Astronomical Society of the Pacific doi 10.1088/1538-3873/aa5457
- Lisa F. Smith, Jeffrey K. Smith, Kimberly K. Arcand, Randall K. Smith, Jay Bookbinder, Kelly Keach (09/2010) *Aesthetics and Astronomy: Studying the Public's Perception and Understanding of Imagery from Space* Science Communication Journal doi 10.1177/1075547010379579
