= Felicity Smoak (Arrowverse) =

Fictional character from the TV series Arrow

- Arrowverse character
- Emily Bett Rickards as Felicity Smoak during the filming of the episode "Lone Gunmen."
- First appearance: "Lone Gunmen"; Arrow Season 1×3; October 24, 2012
- Last appearance: "Fadeout"; Arrow Season 8×10; January 28, 2020
- Based on: Felicity Smoak by: Gerry Conway; Rafael Kayanan
- Adapted by: Greg Berlanti; Marc Guggenheim; Andrew Kreisberg
- Portrayed by: Emily Bett Rickards

In-universe information
- Full name: Felicity Megan Smoak
- Aliases: Overwatch; Ghost Fox Goddess; The Calculator
- Affiliation: Team Arrow
- Family: Donna Smoak (mother); Noah Kuttler (father); Oliver Queen (husband); Mia Smoak (daughter); William Clayton (stepson)
- Religion: Judaism

Felicity Megan Smoak, also known by her code name Overwatch, is a fictional character in The CW's Arrowverse franchise. The character was first introduced in 2012 in the first season of the television series Arrow, which is based on the DC Comics character Green Arrow. The series follows the story of billionaire Oliver Queen, who returns home after five years supposedly stranded on a remote Pacific island (Lian Yu) and becomes a vigilante on a quest to save his city. Felicity is based on the comic book character of the same name, created by Gerry Conway and Rafael Kayanan and was adapted for television by Greg Berlanti, Marc Guggenheim and Andrew Kreisberg. Felicity was portrayed by Canadian actress Emily Bett Rickards between 2012 and 2020. Initially cast as a one-episode guest star in the first season of Arrow, she returned as a recurring character in the same season, and was promoted to series regular from season two before departing at the end of season seven.

Introduced as having a genius level intellect, with a penchant for inappropriate commentary, Felicity debuted in the third episode of Arrow's first season as an employee of Queen Consolidated, working in the IT department. She is recommended to Oliver Queen by his stepfather/CEO of the company Walter Steele, to assist him with an IT issue. She later joins Oliver in his crusade becoming one of the founding members of "Team Arrow", alongside John Diggle, and goes on to adopt the moniker "Overwatch". She becomes CEO of Palmer Technologies and subsequently founds her own company, Smoak Tech. Her relationship with Oliver develops into a romantic one, leading to their marriage and to her becoming stepmother to his son, William, and later mother to their daughter, Mia.

Often cited as a positive representation of women in STEM, Felicity has been described as Arrow's "fan favorite" or "breakout" character and has received a generally positive response from critics, with particular praise for Rickards' performance. Critics have described her as an important part of Arrow's success, although at times some expressed concerns that her character became too prominent on the show. In 2016 she was voted number fifteen on a list of "50 Favorite Female Characters", in a poll of Hollywood professionals conducted by The Hollywood Reporter.

== Concept and creation ==
Early in season one, the creative team behind Arrow wanted to introduce a tech-savvy character for a season one scene, drawing inspiration from DC Comics catalogue of characters. Producers originally considered using Karen Beecher/Bumblebee, but opted to use the lesser-known Felicity Smoak, a character created by Gerry Conway and Rafael Kayanan for The Fury of Firestorm in 1984. Emily Bett Rickards was initially cast for the role as a one-episode guest star, but following a positive response from lead Stephen Amell and Warner Bros. executive Peter Roth, as well as from journalists at preview screenings, her role was extended to recurring throughout the season. Andrew Kreisberg commented that he and fellow showrunner Marc Guggenheim were impressed both with her performance and by Amell's response to her character, and that they received positive feedback stating "And then the network called, and then the studio called and they were like 'This girl, who is she?'" Rickards joined the main cast of the show from season two onwards. Regarding this decision, Guggenheim explained that producers realized that Felicity would either have to learn the truth about Oliver Queen, or "go away" and that "once we decided that she couldn't go away ... making her a series regular was kind of a no-brainer."

Over the course of the series, Felicity developed into one of the show's principal characters, described by producers as the show's "secret weapon" and an "integral and active part of the dynamic of the show." Discussing Felicity's role in the show, Kreisberg commented that he felt "Arrow wasn't Arrow" until the episode where she learns Oliver's secret identity. Looking back at Arrow's run ahead of its eighth and final season, Amell observed that "I don't know that show works if we don't randomly find her". Rickards announced in March 2019 that she would be leaving the Arrowverse at the end of Arrow's seventh season, although the producers left open the possibility of her returning as a guest star in the series final season. Following this announcement, Guggenheim echoed Amell's sentiments when speaking at San Diego Comic-Con ahead of the season eight premiere, stating that "For the longest time, I've been saying you can't do the show without Emily Rickards" and that he would not have considered a full twenty-two episode final season without the actress. In November 2019, it was announced that Rickards would return in a guest role for the series finale.

== Development ==
=== Characterization ===
Felicity Megan Smoak is introduced as an IT expert working for Queen Consolidated in her first appearance in the season one Arrow episode "Lone Gunmen". In her fictional background story, the character was born on July 24, 1989, and is stated to have demonstrated a strong academic ability from an early age, going on to graduate summa cum laude from MIT in 2009 at the age of 20 with a Masters of Science in Computer Sciences and Cyber Security. Her early years are later expanded upon in the season two episode "City of Blood", where she states she was raised in Las Vegas by her mother Donna Smoak, who worked as a cocktail waitress, and in the season four episode "Sins of the Father" with the introduction of her father, Noah Kuttler. Her father is introduced as a career criminal who Felicity believed abandoned his family when she was seven years old although it is later revealed that her mother had in fact left him in order to protect Felicity from his criminal lifestyle. The character is also stated to be Jewish and a descendant of Holocaust survivors.

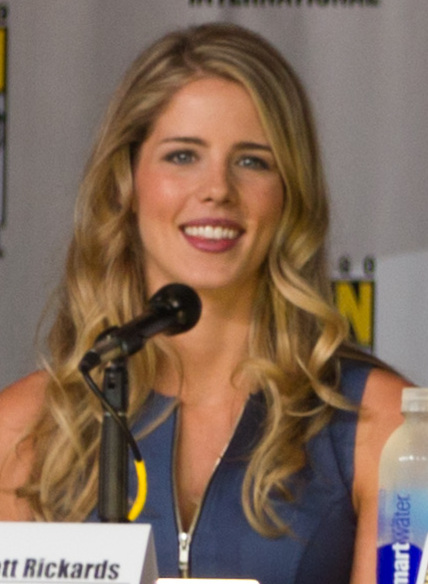
Actress Emily Bett Rickards who portrays Felicity

Following her promotion to series regular, Rickards commented that Felicity was "a character who's intelligent and brave and facing huge situations, and being real in how she's facing them". She also acknowledged the difficulties that the character had at times interacting with people, but admired how she had dealt with that throughout the season. Rickards has described Felicity as having "a very mathematical and systematic mind", and sees her tendency to make inappropriate comments as part of that focus stating "I don't think they're parts on their own. She's so dialed into what she's doing that when she has to speak, she's not thinking clearly about what's coming out." Describing the character early in season two, Rickards stated that she had "lot more confidence and she has this power behind her" compared to season one, due to her having a clear purpose. Discussing her motivation, Rickards explained "She just wants justice. I think she feels really deeply through other people" and that she would be unlikely to be motivated by revenge. Previewing Arrow season four, she felt that at time during season three Felicity had "lost a little bit of her strength", and that the "Arrow life took up a lot more of her space emotionally and physically." She described two of Felicity's strongest characteristics as her strength and independence, and felt that season four would see her rebuild these qualities.

Following Oliver's incarceration and Felicity's enforced exile into witness protection alongside her step-son, Rickards discussed the ways in which Felicity had to change going into season seven, expressing that "her original mindset is a little broken" by events in her life, leaving the character unsure of "where now she believes justice and her morals lie". Previewing the season, new showrunner Beth Schwartz echoed similar sentiments, saying "We're going to see a different side to Felicity than we've ever seen.....she's going to take matters into her own hands a lot this season. She's going to fight back." In a 2025 interview, Rickards reflected on the role, commenting that she felt the character "got a little lost in the later seasons" and that there were "things that I wish that Felicity stood up for".

=== Team Arrow ===
Felicity, alongside John Diggle, is shown to play an important role in the transitioning of Oliver Queen from a 'lone wolf' to part of a vigilante team. This working relationship between these three characters has been described both in the media and the show as 'Original Team Arrow', and has received particular praise from critics. Commenting on this "symbiotic relationship", terming it "Arrow's most important", Carrie Raisler of The A.V. Club stated "Amell, Ramsey, and Rickards have the kind of lightning-in-a-bottle chemistry that makes all their scenes together hum", in her review of the first half of season two. Similarly, Jesse Schedeen of IGN, reviewing both the season three premiere and the series finale, described the three as the "core trio" of the show and Jenny Rafferty of Vulture, writing about season four, described the relationship between the three as "the heartbeat of the show". Reviewing the season five episode "Bratva" for Yahoo TV, Robert Chan expressed that "no matter how many people you add, this show still comes down to the balance of Oliver, Diggle, and Felicity". Looking back at the series during her review of the season seven finale, Della Harrington of Den of Geek commented that "The magic of the show and the magic of his [Oliver's] team within the show alchemised when John Diggle and Felicity Smoak signed on".

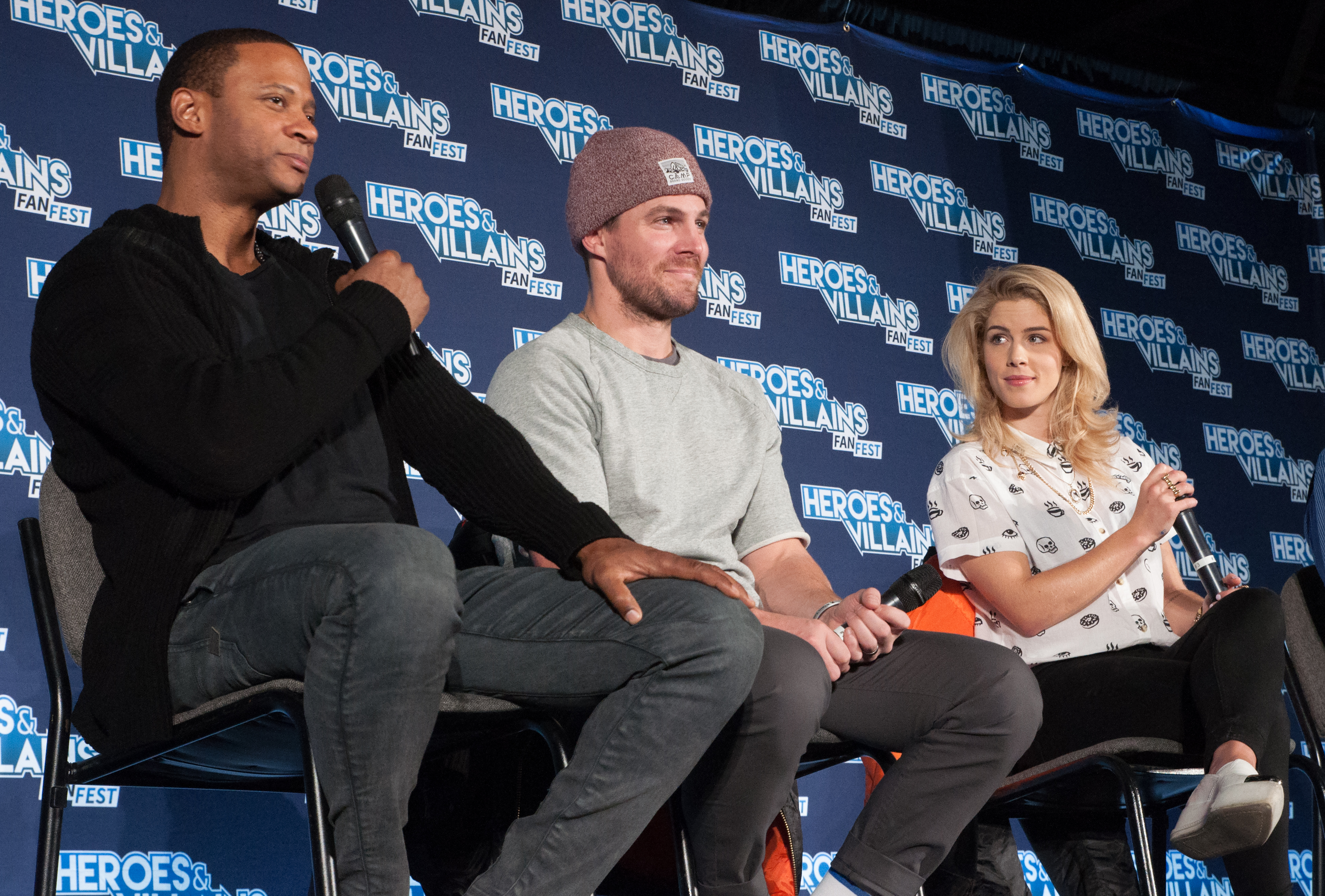
Rickards, Amell and Ramsey who portray Felicity, Oliver Queen and John Diggle respectively

Discussing Felicity's role within the team during season one, Rickards described the character as bringing a "different dynamic" to the table, with an "objective point of view". Discussing the character's growth across the first season, she noted how with each new experience with 'Team Arrow' Felicity "shrugs off one more restriction that was keeping her held back" and that working undercover allowed her to "put aside some of her inhibitions, and become someone else for a while". During season two, when Felicity demonstrates a sense of inadequacy in terms of her place in the team, Oliver's assurances reemphasize her central role in his mission. Describing Felicity's place on the team, Rickards stated "She is a hero. She's not the muscle. She's the brain". She went on to explain that she felt that Felicity being on the team helped her to be more confident with who she is, saying "she's also learning to accept and embrace her brainpower, when before she always felt isolated by it". Speaking in 2014, executive producer Andrew Kreisberg talked about the writing team recognizing the importance of the three characters to the dynamic of the show, and working to bring the storyline back to them.

The season four premiere demonstrated how important her work as a vigilante is to Felicity, showcasing her reluctance to leave that life for one of domesticity, with her secretly communicating with the team in Star City during her and Oliver's time away. Ahead of the premiere, Rickards commented that Felicity "wasn't necessarily aware of how much she was going to be miss it", and found herself asking the question "I'm missing something. What am I missing?". In the season five premiere, she is also the primary motivator behind recruiting new members for the team.

=== STEM ===
As well as using her Science, Technology, Engineering, and Mathematics (STEM) related skills in her vigilante work, Felicity is also regularly recognized and acknowledged by other characters within the Arrowverse in the professional and academic sphere. When Felicity is first introduced she is shown to be an employee of Queen Consolidated in the IT department. Following Oliver's loss of his Queen Consolidated at the end of season two, Felicity is the driving force behind his bid to regain the company in the season three premiere. However, rival bidder Ray Palmer (Brandon Routh) also employs her skills, without her knowledge, to help his ultimately successful bid to take over the company. He goes on to offer her the position of vice-president at the newly renamed "Palmer Technologies". Discussing Ray's motivation for hiring Felicity, Routh explained that it was purely because "he wants the best brain to help him achieve his goal". Following Ray's supposed death in the season three finale, Felicity is appointed CEO of the company. Regarding Felicity's new role, Rickards noted how "she's a lot better at it than she thought she would be" and that it is a challenge the character had embraced. When asked about the development of storylines focussed on Felicity's professional life in 2016, David Ramsey, who plays John Diggle, stated, "I like the idea that she can be her own person, and she can be strong and feminine, own the company, without pining over men".

"She's got an extreme IQ and she's a genius, but she's normal and she finds herself in these very high-stake situations. She's very vulnerable. She's just very relatable and honest."

— Actress Emily Bett Rickards speaking about Felicity's intellect and appeal

Critics have been generally positive regarding the character's role as an IT expert. Writing about the character for the Daily Beast in 2017, Regina Lizik called Felicity "the role model your daughter (and you) are looking for". She also praised the character for breaking what she called the "geek-ditz complex", for being portrayed as both feminine and intelligent at the same time. Victoria McNally, writing in 2015 for MTV, praised the presentation of "science nerds", including Felicity, within the Arrowverse as "relatable people" and for "dispelling the stereotype of scientists as asocial losers". She also welcomed the diversity of the characters, including their family backgrounds. However, during Arrow's third season, Samantha Nelson of The A.V. Club saw Felicity as part of a new stereotype for "geek girls" on television, of "women who are smart and competent but in an entirely nonthreatening way". Conversely, Jessica Toomer, writing for Uproxx towards the end of Arrow's fifth season, described Felicity as "a fully rounded character, one with agency and abilities" and praised the show for "flipping the 'geek gets girl' trope on its gender-confined head". Jesse Schedeen of IGN welcomed Felicity's new role as CEO in Arrow season four, stating she was "no longer a supporting character defined by her relationships to men like Ollie and Ray. She faces her own struggle completely independent from what Team Arrow are currently dealing. This seems like a really promising evolution for her."

The character is frequently referenced in articles regarding positive media representations of women in STEM. Advocating for more women to take up careers in the field, European Space Agency engineer Vinita Marwaha Madill referenced Felicity as a positive role model for young girls. Similarly, discussing the lack of women in STEM for ITSP Magazine, Avani Desai included Felicity as one of the "intelligent, capable and empowering women in Hollywood's tech world" that "remain the exception, not the rule". The character has also been cited as a positive role model for young women entering science and technology based careers.

=== Relationships ===
==== Oliver Queen ====
The romantic relationship between Felicity and Oliver Queen was a prominent theme throughout the majority of Arrow's run. In the DC Comics canon, Green Arrow is often romantically partnered with Black Canary, and in season one Arrow presented their versions of the characters as each other's significant love interest. However, Felicity's introduction ultimately led producers to change course. Whilst there was no initial intention to develop a romance between the characters of Felicity and Oliver, it was the on-screen chemistry between Rickards and Amell that led to this change. Speaking in 2013 executive producer Marc Guggenheim acknowledged that on screen Oliver and Felicity had "palpable chemistry", but also that his relationship with Laurel in season one had to "sort of play...out" before the show could shift focus. Ahead of Arrow's season three premiere, executive producer Greg Berlanti stated that the romantic relationship between Oliver and Felicity was "something that we've been working toward and building toward since she first showed up on the show" with fellow executive producer Andrew Kreisberg saying the timing was right to further evolve the Oliver—Felicity dynamic.

"I hope that it's because it's honest and working towards a place of what we all sort of want and where we can see ourselves bettering ourselves. I don't know what the magic equation is to writing something that hits somebody at a certain time. We're so grateful....I think the way that they communicate and talk to each other is about them growing...there is such a purpose towards them working as a couple and working through it."

— Rickards speaking in 2018 about the appeal of Felicity and Oliver's relationship.

The emergence of the relationship was largely welcomed by critics. Reviewing the episode "Taken", in which the couple split up, James Queally of the Los Angeles Times praised the way the show had made the audience "care about a relationship storyline " in a show built around action, as well as the performances of Rickards and Amell, commenting, with regard to their characters, that "they both love each other in a way that jumps off the screen". In his review of "Dangerous Liaisons" in season five, for TVOvermind, Chris King wrote that the episode showed "how essential their relationship is to Arrow's DNA". He went on to describe Felicity as Oliver's "conscience", and felt that the episode effectively demonstrated how he had become the same for her. Discussing the impact of the couples break-up on Felicity whilst reviewing the episode "Broken Hearts", Jesse Schedeen of IGN welcomed the way Rickards "showed Felicity fighting a losing battle to remain chipper and friendly despite being torn up inside". Reviewing the same episode for Vulture Jenny Rafferty described Felicity's reaction as "a very realistic way someone as analytical as Felicity would cope" and praised the way the character "makes clear she loves Oliver, but, more important, she loves and values herself outside of that relationship enough to step away". Some critics expressed concerns that the relationship became too dominant a feature in the show over the course of seasons three and four. and over the pace of the storytelling, particularly in regard to the couples break-up. This issue was acknowledged by Guggenheim who, when asked about any regrets he had before Arrow's 100th episode aired, stated that he regretted the pace at which the relationship moved in season four, saying "we had set these tentpoles at the beginning of the season, and we were a bit too rigorous on how we hit them" and that it was a case of plot overriding storytelling. The relationship proved to be popular with many fans, winning MTV's "Ship of the Year" in 2015 and 2016.

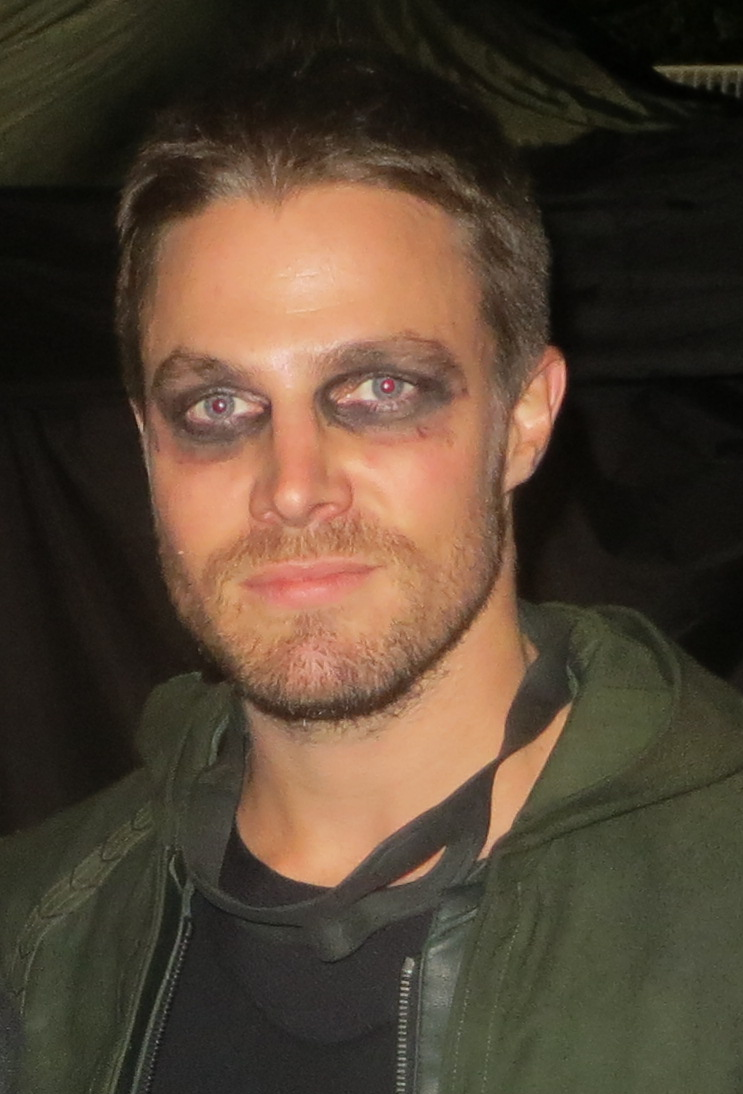
Stephen Amell, who portrays Oliver Queen

Speaking in the early days of Arrow about the development of a potential romantic relationship between Oliver and Felicity, Rickards stated that "the scenes Oliver and Felicity have together are always honest. He doesn't have to hide anything from her, which is spectacular." Series lead Stephen Amell echoed similar sentiments at the start of season two, stating "she's the woman at the moment who knows me better than anybody". Discussing the season two declaration of love Oliver makes to Felicity in order to capture his nemesis Slade Wilson, Amell stated "clearly he meant it". At the start of season three, Rickards acknowledged that Felicity was also in love with Oliver. Speaking during the season, following the pair's failed first date, Rickards said of Felicity's feelings for Oliver "There's just so much love for him that she couldn't imagine not talking to him for the rest of her life ever". When asked in 2015, towards the end of season three, if the show had room for a "great love", Amell stated "Felicity has clearly, over the course of two-plus seasons, grown into that love for him." The couple split up during season four and later reunite in the season five finale. Talking about their relationship over this period, Amell stated "I think they both love each other very much and care about each other" despite no longer being a couple, maintaining that Felicity remained "the person that he's going to go to, if he has something to confide or work through". Rickards felt that the couple "still have a really deep connection" and regarding their future that "you do grow apart, sometimes, before you can grow together". During the 2017 Arrowverse crossover event "Crisis on Earth-X", the pair marry in a storyline described by showrunner Wendy Mericle as one in which Oliver "explores the question of true love". Season seven saw the couple separated due to Oliver's incarceration, and later reunited on his release. Talking about the impact on the couple's relationship, showrunner Beth Schwartz explained that "we're really going for the real struggles in marriage." During the 2018 Arrowverse crossover event, "Elseworlds", the couple are shown to resolve the issues caused by their separation, with Schwartz stating that Oliver had struggled to come to terms with how the situation had changed Felicity, and that his experience in the crossover enabled him to "understand her journey" a little more. The episode sees Oliver call Felicity "the love of his life", with Schwartz describing the couple as "in a good place". She went on to describe them as "a team" and as "a force to reckon with" in their approach to overcoming obstacles. Schwartz described part of the appeal of the couple as the fact that they are opposites, commenting that what Oliver loves most about Felicity is "her brain".

Rickards has said in interviews that she believes Felicity and Oliver and are soul mates, sentiments Amell has echoed. Asked if Arrow could ultimately have pursued other romantic pairings for Oliver in 2018, Amell stated "In our show, it was going to be Oliver and Felicity, no matter what". Speaking ahead of the shows final season, Amell attributed the success of both the relationship and the character of Felicity to Rickards' performance. During the series retrospective "Hitting the Bullseye", which aired on The CW prior to the series finale, Amell called the pair's relationship "the most important relationship that we've seen on the show".

==== Family ====
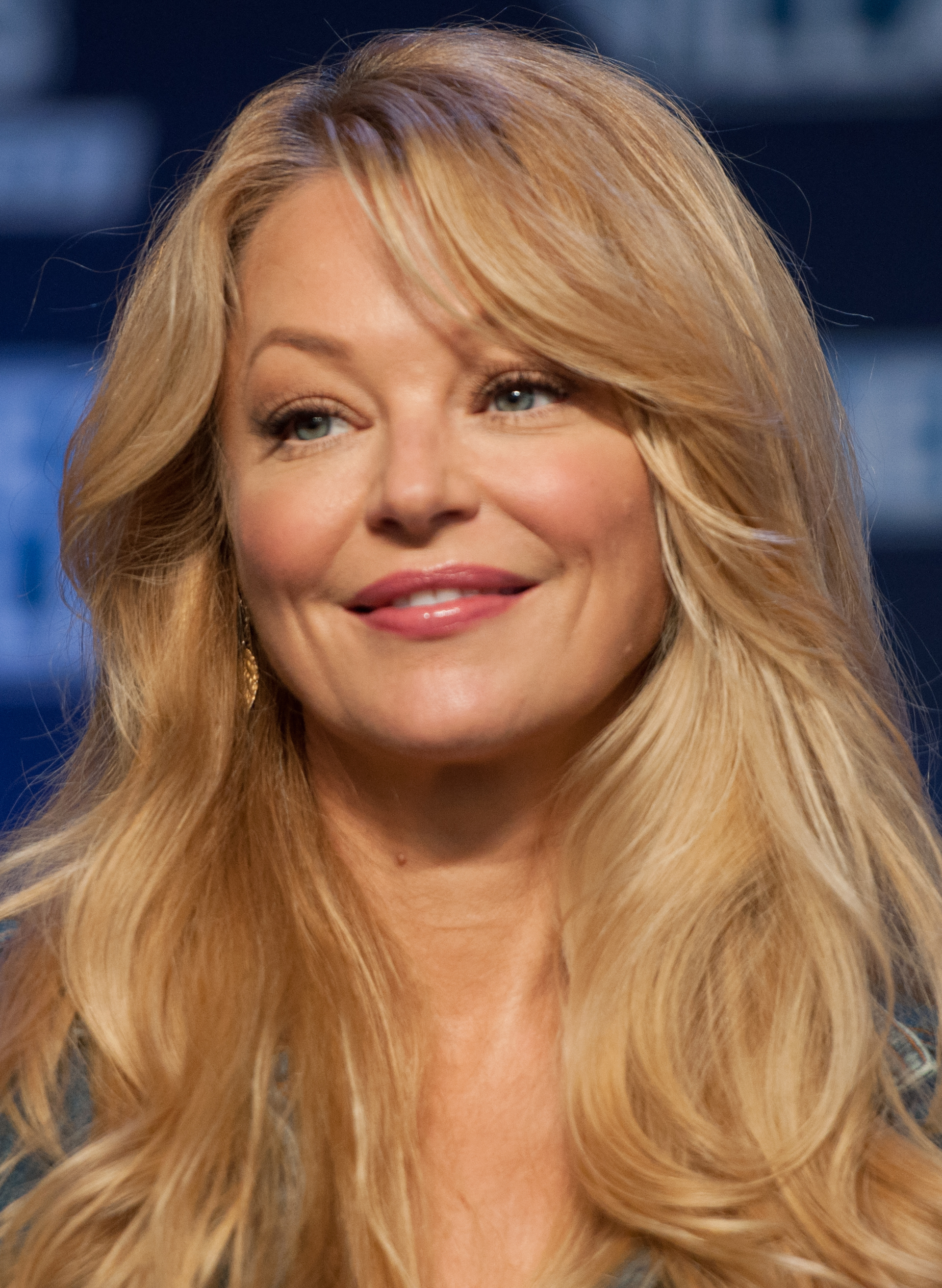
Charlotte Ross, who portrayed Felicty's mother Donna

Felicity's mother, Donna Smoak, is introduced in the episode "The Secret Origin of Felicity Smoak". Rickards described Felicity as "definitely embarrassed by her", but stated that through the course of the episode "she ends up accepting her mother for who she is...which is what her mother has taught her to do...Felicity realizes that the acceptance she has for other people sometimes comes later for the people we love the most". She further acknowledged that whilst the pair were very different people, Felicity's "emotional intelligence" comes from her mother. The relationship develops over the course of the series, with Charlotte Ross, who played Donna, stating "they love each other and really support each other and there's a natural comfortability between the two of them" and that their relationship had grown into a genuine friendship. She felt the on-screen success and popularity of the mother-daughter relationship was due to the pair's chemistry and that as actors "we fall into a natural rhythm". Rickards commented that "Donna brings out something in Felicity that no one else can" and how that relationship had evolved the character over time, in particular with regard to "Donna being a single woman and having sacrificed so much for Felicity and Felicity being an adult now and realizing her sacrifice is HUGE". She also acknowledged that Felicity had "pictured her [Donna] a certain way", and that learning more about the struggles she faced helped Felicity understand her mother better.

Speaking about the impact on the character following the introduction of Felicity's father, Noah Kuttler (portrayed by Tom Amandes), also known as The Calculator, in the season four episode "Unchained", showrunner Wendy Mericle commented that "I think she's really conflicted. She wants to believe that her father loves her and that he has a vested interest in who she is and knowing her and having a relationship with her, and she feels very torn about that". Talking about the pair's difficult relationship, Amandes described Noah as "very proud and [that he] has lots of feelings for his amazing daughter", despite the animosity between them. Discussing the impact of her father's return towards the end of season four, Mericle stated Felicity would be exploring the question "is she a Smoak or is she a Kuttler?" and give her a new perspective.

In season seven Felicity reveals to Oliver that she is pregnant and later gives birth to their daughter, Mia. During the season's flash-forward sequences, set in 2040, the audience is introduced to the adult Mia Smoak portrayed by Katherine McNamara. Discussing Mia's relationship with Felicity, McNamara described it as "strained", but that she still very much cares for her.

==== Other relationships ====
The character of Barry Allen, who would go on to headline Arrowverse spin-off show The Flash, is introduced in the season two Arrow episode "The Scientist" He and Felicity quickly form a bond, which develops into a potential romantic link. During Felicity's appearance in the season one The Flash episode "Going Rogue", the pair agree to remain platonic friends, with Rickards stating that even though they appear well matched "It's interesting that you don't always fall in love with someone that you're perfectly perfect for."

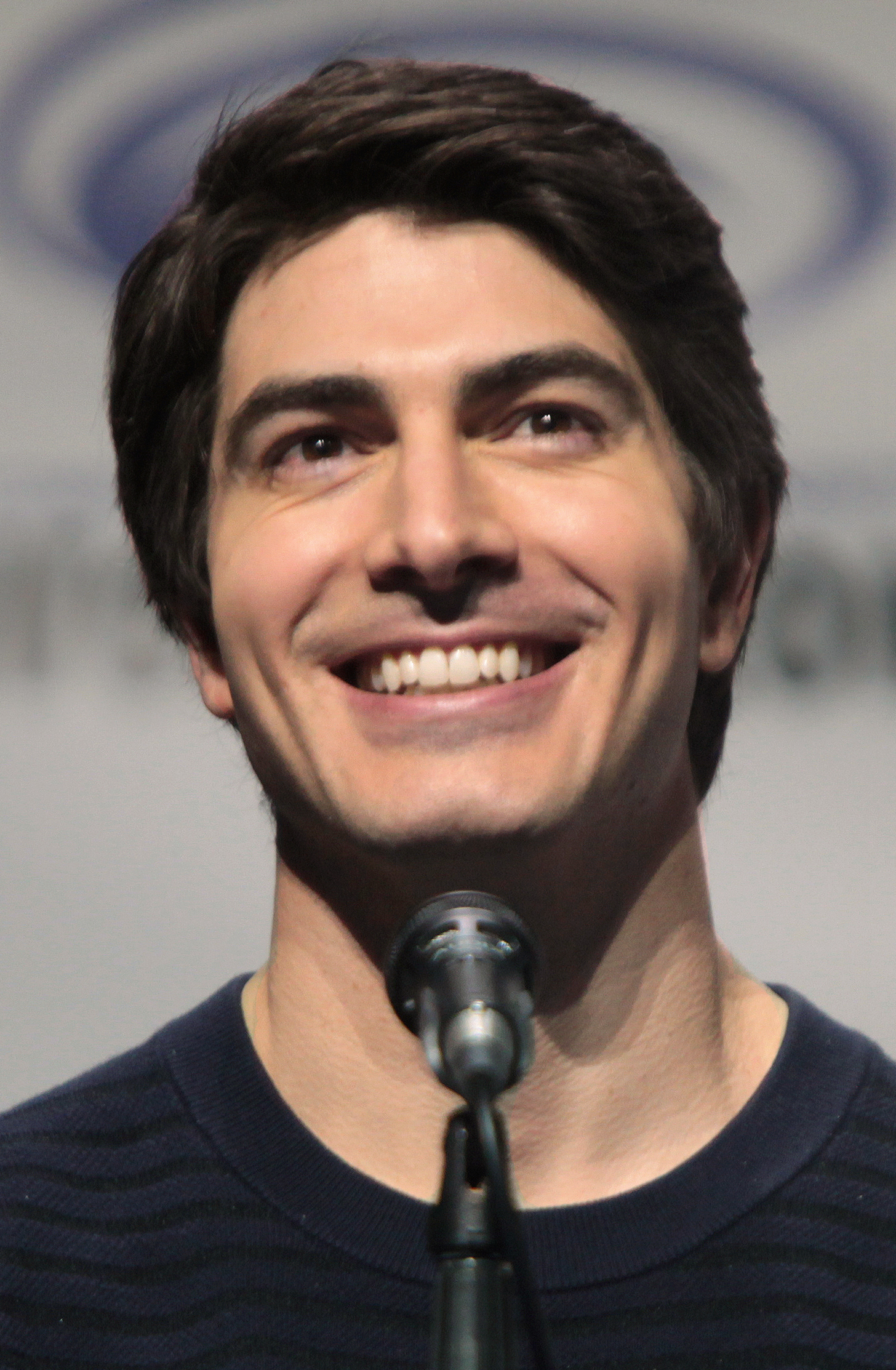
Brandon Routh, who portrays Ray Palmer

In Arrow season three, Felicity begins a professional and later romantic relationship with Ray Palmer, played by Brandon Routh. Describing the difference in Felicity's dynamic with Ray compared to that with Oliver, Rickards explained "It's more fun and light, and there's not this heavy weight on it, all the time. That's really important for Felicity right now". Routh echoed similar sentiments, contrasting Ray's "lightness, and his naivete" to Oliver's darkness, and felt that was something Felicity was attracted to. He also emphasized that Ray "only has good intentions with Felicity", and that his initial pursuit of her was purely due to her intelligence, only realizing in the episode "Draw Back Your Bow" that his feelings were something more. Speaking ahead of the season four premiere, with regard to the ending of the relationship, Rickards commented that she "was a little upset [at Felicity] for not giving him an explanation to a certain extent", although she acknowledged that Ray was aware of the reasons it ended. She also described the relationship as a whole as "a very important learning curve" for Felicity and that "she learned a lot about herself of how she could be in a relationship with somebody that really cares for her".

Arrow's season five premiere sees the introduction of Felicity's new boyfriend Billy Malone played by Tyler Ritter. Regarding the relationship, Rickards felt that "it's a little soon", but that Felicity was" just trying to figure things out". In the mid-season finale, Oliver is tricked into killing Billy by Prometheus. His death acts as a catalyst for leading Felicity to a "darker place", as described by Wendy Mericle, who went on to say "It's a color for Felicity that we've always known she had the potential for, but we never had the right story to play." Marc Guggenheim expressed a similar sentiment, stating that Felicity's 'darker path' was "the sum of a bunch of stuff, and Billy was sort of the final straw."

As well as being vigilante team-mates, the friendship between Felicity and John Diggle is a significant one for the character. Ahead of Arrow's second season, David Ramsey agreed with the descriptor of Felicity as a surrogate sister to Diggle, describing them as part of a "family unit".

The working relationship and friendship between Felicity and Curtis Holt played by Echo Kellum, develops in Arrow season four. Talking about the pair's friendship, Kellum described it as having "an aspect to their relationship where he gives her the motivation to do the hard thing...and he will be that friend she can go to and cry on and talk about stuff that's going on with".

Both Rickards and Katie Cassidy, who portrays Laurel Lance, expressed a desire to see, and a disappointment in the lack of, the friendship between their characters on screen. During season three, Rickards described the relationship between the two women as "sisterly love" and went on to say in 2016, with regards to the pair's lack of on-screen interaction, "We are always debating and adding things Katie and I, because their friendship is solidified, they're not just people who work together, so I'd like that [more interaction] to happen". Regarding the season four death of the character, Mericle stated that it would "have a huge impact" on Felicity and her actions. During the second season of The Flash a new, initially antagonistic, version of Laurel Lance is introduced, originating from the alternate Earth known as Earth-2. The character is also portrayed by Cassidy, who rejoined the cast of Arrow from season six onwards. In season seven, Felicity develops a relationship with this version of Laurel which is shown to evolve from an uneasy alliance to a more solid friendship. Discussing his directorial debut in Arrow season seven, David Ramsey described the relationship between the pair as "one of the highlights of the season".

=== Paralysis ===
In the season four mid-season finale, Felicity and Oliver are shown to be attacked by gunmen, the resulting injuries leaving Felicity paralyzed from the waist down, as revealed in the episode "Blood Debts". Regarding the impact of Felicity's paralysis in season four, Rickards stated that "keeping Felicity's voice and keeping her attitude towards life positive while faced with this total rearrangement of her life was something I tried hard to portray". Executive producer Wendy Mericle expressed that Felicity was "try[ing] to maintain that level of optimism", but also that the show would demonstrate how she goes on "a little bit of a dark journey of her own as she tries to grapple with the reality of this new situation". Mericle further described Felicity's reaction as "really looking back at her life choices and doing some hard thinking and reevaluating." She also stated that whilst Felicity's initial reaction to the news was seemingly calm, dealing with the day to day realities of the adjustments in her life would affect her greatly.

The character regains her ability to walk with the help of a prototype microchip in the episode "Taken", designed by Curtis Holt. Talking about the storyline as a whole, Rickards expressed regret that more time was not taken to show the true impact of such life changing injuries on everyday life, but acknowledged that "that's not what our show is about". Rickards also filmed a Public Service Announcement in conjunction with the Christopher & Dana Reeve Foundation advocating for advancements in the treatment of spinal injuries, released on the air date of the episode.

=== Costume ===
Arrow and Legends of Tomorrow co-developer and former showrunner Marc Guggenheim has insisted in interviews that he had no intention of transitioning Felicity into a costumed superhero stating in 2017 "for as long as I'm involved with the show, the two things I never want to do is kill off Thea and put Felicity in a mask and a costume." In the same year, Felicity did appear in a brief cameo in the penultimate season two episode of Legends of Tomorrow, "Doomworld", as a masked superhero in an alternate timeline, a choice Guggenheim stated was made because "we'll probably never have the opportunity to do so again".

== Storylines ==
=== Arrow ===
In season one, on the recommendation of Walter Steele, Felicity assists Oliver Queen with various discreet jobs, not knowing his secret, but realizing that there is something else behind them. When Oliver is shot by Moira Queen, he waits in Felicity's car to ask for her help, thus revealing his identity. Following the abduction of Walter Steele, Felicity joins Oliver and Diggle in the lair, in order to find him. She later decides to continue working with them as technical support in order to stop 'The Undertaking'. After travelling with John Diggle to Lian Yu at the start of season two, in order to persuade Oliver to return to Starling City, the character moves from the I.T. department to become Oliver's Executive Assistant at Queen Consolidated, as a cover for their vigilante activities. During this season, Felicity meets Central City CSI Barry Allen, who later becomes the super-fast hero known as the Flash. In the final episode of the season, she plays a pivotal role in helping capture Oliver's enemy, Slade Wilson / Deathstroke.

In season three Felicity and Oliver attempt to start a romantic relationship, but this is thwarted when he decides he can not do so whilst being the Arrow. During the episode "The Secret Origin of Felicity Smoak", it is revealed that Felicity was a goth in College, and that her ex-boyfriend, Cooper, went to jail for using a computer virus she designed. Felicity begins working for the new owner of Queen Consolidated, now Palmer Technologies, Ray Palmer, eventually becoming vice-president, as well as helping him to develop his Atom suit. The two date, but break up when they both realize Felicity is still in love with Oliver. They remain friends, working together to save the city from a deadly virus. By the end of season three, Oliver and Felicity are seen driving away from Starling City together to live a more normal life. During a flashback sequence, it is revealed that Oliver first saw Felicity in his father's office in 2010, when he was in Starling City working under duress for A.R.G.U.S. The season also sees the introduction of Felicity's mother, Donna Smoak.

Oliver and Felicity are seemingly living happily in Ivy Town in the season four premiere, when Laurel Lance and Thea Queen arrive to ask for their help in Starling (now Star) City. After returning to Star City, Felicity admits to Oliver that she misses working with the team, and the two agree to stay on. Now also CEO of Palmer Technologies, Felicity uses her position and resources to try and help the team combat Hive. In the mid-season finale, following their engagement, Oliver and Felicity are ambushed in their limo by gunmen, leaving Felicity paralyzed from the waist down. Despite initial doubts, Felicity rejoins the team, with Oliver giving her the moniker 'Overwatch'. With the help of Curtis Holt, who creates a prototype microchip, Felicity regains the ability to walk. The character breaks off her engagement to Oliver following revelations that he had been lying to her about his son, William Clayton, which also leads to her leaving the team. Following Laurel's murder at the hands of Damien Darhk, she rejoins them, to help bring down Darhk, which ultimately leads her to have to make the decision to re-divert a nuclear bomb from the city of Monument Point to the town of Havenrock, with a lesser but still high loss of life. She is also fired from her job as CEO, due to her consistently neglecting her position. The season ends with Oliver and Felicity alone, in the ruins of their lair. This season also sees the introduction of Felicity's father, revealed to be cyber-criminal Noah Kuttler.

The start of season five sees Oliver and Felicity as still the only members of the team left. Felicity is instrumental in persuading Oliver to recruit new team members. She also has a new boyfriend in Detective Billy Malone, whom Oliver is later tricked into killing by Prometheus. She begins to work with shady hacking organisation Helix in a bid to find and stop Prometheus, which ultimately brings her into conflict with Oliver and the team when she aids Helix in freeing their leader, Cayden James, from an A.R.G.U.S. prison. After Prometheus sets off an EMP, which temporarily disables her spinal chip, Felicity and Oliver are trapped in the bunker. As they struggle to escape, they manage to resolve the problems standing in the way of their being together. The two decide to tentatively rekindle their romantic relationship. Following the explosion on Lian Yu in the season finale, Felicity's fate is unknown.

Felicity is shown to be safe and well in the season six premiere, still working with the team. She and Oliver are once more involved in a romantic relationship. Together with Curtis, Felicity decides to start a tech company, "Helix Dynamics". Her worst fears are realized when it is revealed that Cayden James, whom she helped free from A.R.G.U.S. custody is in fact a criminal. Following her marriage to Oliver, Felicity begins to bond with his son William. In the season finale, Oliver is arrested by the FBI, leaving Felicity as William's sole parent.

Following Oliver's incarceration and Ricardo Diaz's escape, Felicity and William begin season seven living away from Star City, under Witness Protection. Felicity is shown to be working as a barista. However, after Diaz attacks them in their home, the pair return to Star City. Felicity takes the decision to send William to a boarding school under A.R.G.U.S. protection, whilst she stays to assist in the pursuit of Diaz. Throughout the first half of the season, she works with a series of unlikely allies in her attempts to both bring Diaz to justice and to free Oliver from prison. She forms a friendship with Earth-2 Laurel Lance, who also tells her that on her Earth, Felicity Smoak is a successful, but ruthless, business woman. Felicity is reunited with Oliver following his release from prison. With the help of Alena Whitlock, Felicity starts her own company, Smoak Tech. She realizes the danger of the 'Archer' program she has been developing and attempts to destroy it, but the code is stolen by Alena. During the season, Felicity discovers that she is pregnant, eventually giving birth to a girl named Mia, who is raised in secrecy outside of Star City. Following Mia's birth, Felicity and Oliver are forced to part, when he leaves with the Monitor to assist in averting an oncoming crisis, with the implication that he will not return.

The season also features flash forwards, set twenty years in the future, where it is initially believed that Felicity has been recently murdered. The flash forwards feature an adult Mia, who teams up with William, Connor Hawke, Dinah Drake, Roy Harper, and Zoe Ramirez to uncover the conspiracy around Felicity's supposed death, eventually finding her alive and rescuing her from Galaxy One, an Eden Corps front, who have subjugated Star City and the Glades with Felicity's Archer program. When an arrest warrant is put out for Felicity, she is identified as "The Calculator". After the group successfully takes down Galaxy One, Felicity shares an emotional goodbye with Mia and William before leaving with the Monitor to reunite with Oliver at a place from which "there is no return".

During the series finale, "Fadeout", Felicity returns to Star City to aid the team in tracking down young William, who has been kidnapped. She also attends Oliver's funeral, and meets the adult Mia. The final scene of the series leads on from the season seven finale. with Felicity leaving with The Monitor. She and Oliver are reunited, in a facsimile of Moira Queen's former office at Queen Consolidated. The pair appear to be in a 'paradise dimension' with Oliver telling Felicity that they have "all the time in the world". The scene also features a flashback to season three, showing the first time Oliver saw Felicity, unbeknownst to her at the time.

=== The Flash ===
Felicity first appears in the series during the season one episode "Going Rogue", where she helps the team rescue Barry Allen from Leonard Snart. She and Barry confirm their friendship, and agree to keep their relationship platonic. She also meets Harrison Wells, who is aware of her academic achievements. Later in the season, she and Ray Palmer travel to Central City to assist Team Flash with meta-human Brie Larvan, in the episode "All Star Team Up".

At the start of the season three episode "Paradox", Barry comes to Felicity for advice regarding the repercussions of 'Flashpoint'. During season four, Felicity makes an appearance at the bachelorette party of Iris West in the episode "Girls Night Out" and helps to thwart the efforts of Amunet Black.

=== Crossover events ===
Felicity features in both the Arrow and Flash episodes of the first Arrowverse crossover 'event', "Flash vs. Arrow" in 2014. She plays a central role in the second Arrowverse Crossover event in 2015, (which set up spin-off series Legends of Tomorrow), working with the teams to combat Vandal Savage.

In the 2016 "Invasion" crossover episodes, Felicity is shown working with the teams to combat an alien invasion by the Dominators. During the Arrow episode of the crossover, when Oliver Queen, John Diggle, Thea Queen, Ray Palmer and Sara Lance are trapped in a shared hallucination of an alternate Star City, two versions of Felicity appear, one engaged to Palmer and the other working as a vigilante with Diggle. Upon seeing the latter version, although he has no direct memory of Felicity, Oliver experiences flashbacks to their time together, causing him confusion. A building bearing the name 'Smoak Technologies' also appears in the hallucination, and ultimately acts as the portal to bring the characters back to their reality.

She plays an important role in the first full four-way Arrowverse crossover event entitled "Crisis on Earth X", broadcast in 2017, featuring in all four episodes, beginning with an episode of Supergirl, helping to combat the threat posed by the invasion of Earth-X Nazi's. Her Earth-X counterpart, who is interned in a concentration camp, is also introduced. She is later freed by Earth-1 Oliver Queen, who gives her a gun and tells her "it is the duty of the strong to protect the weak". Oliver and Felicity are both shown to work through insecurities in their relationship across the crossover event, and in the final scene, get married alongside Barry Allen and Iris West, in a service conducted by John Diggle.

In the 2018 "Elseworlds" crossover event, Felicity creates a device to stabilize the inter-dimensional breach, allowing the Earth-90 Flash to enter Earth-1. During the Arrow episode, Felicity and Oliver also resolve their marital issues with Oliver telling Felicity "no matter who you are or what you become ... you will always be the love of my life".

== Reception ==
=== Critical response ===
The character has been described as Arrow's "fan favorite" or "breakout" character, and in 2016 was placed at number 15 on a list of 50 Favorite Female Characters, in a poll of Hollywood professionals conducted by The Hollywood Reporter. Rickards portrayal of Felicity has been nominated for six Teen Choice Awards, five for Choice TV Actress in Fantasy/Sci-Fi/Action and one for Female Breakout Star, in 2014. She has also been nominated for a Leo Award in the Best Lead Performance by a Female in a Dramatic Series category four times.

Felicity's introduction into the series was met with favorable reviews. Her first appearance in the episode "Lone Gunmen" generated a positive response from journalists in preview screenings. Her appearance in the broadcast episode and in subsequent ones, "An Innocent Man" and "Legacies", was welcomed by critics, with many expressing a desire to see more of her. Rickards' promotion to series regular, coupled with Felicity's integration into Oliver's mission in the episode "The Odyssey" prompted IGN's Jesse Scheeden to note "the seeds of transition" in the character whilst also expressing the desire to see "deeper character development" in the longer term. Alasdair Wilkins of The A.V. Club praised the decision to promote Rickards to series regular for season two, and complimented her performance regarding the "deepening of her character". Similarly, Caroline Preece of Den of Geek welcomed the promotion, and in particular the interaction between Felicity, Oliver and Diggle working as a team. Jeffrey Morgan of Digital Spy called Felicity's introduction to "Team Arrow" "a smart move", appreciating the integration of her lighter personality with the more stoic duo of Oliver and Diggle, as well as praising the performances of both Rickards and David Ramsey. In his essay on Arrow's first season, published by Grantland, Andy Greenwald described Felicity as one of the show's "most intriguing characters". Writing for Entertainment Weekly, Adam Carlson wrote "it's hard to imagine a first season without her". In his review of Arrow's season one finale, Alasdair Wilkins of The A.V. Club praised the character's reaction to the destruction of the Glades, stating it "reminds us of the Undertaking's human cost without undermining the character's essential bravery", and praising Rickards' performance for conveying "all those notes in about 10 seconds".

"It's entirely on the strength of Emily Bett Rickards' charming turn that the character has risen to such prominence on this series, and "The Secret Origin of Felicity Smoak" feels like a thank you from the Arrow writing staff to Rickards for everything that she's gifted this show."

— Critic Morgan Jeffrey reviewing the Arrow season three episode "The Secret Origin of Felicity Smoak" for Digital Spy

Throughout the series run, critics praised the development of the character, in particular Rickard's performance, and noted her importance to the show. However, at times some questioned her prominence and the show's possible over reliance on her. In his review of Arrow's first season, Jesse Scheedon of IGN expressed mixed feelings in regard to Felicity, describing her as "both endearing and annoying". However, in his season two review, he felt that the character "often had the best material" and had "established herself as a force to be reckoned with." Reviewing the season three episode of Arrow 'The Secret Origin of Felicity Smoak', one which heavily focused on Felicity following the previous episode where she had been largely absent, Schedeen noted how this highlighted "how much emptier Starling City is without Felicity Smoak".

During his review of Arrow season four, whilst conceding that the audience reaction to both Felicity and in particular to her romance with Oliver had been mixed, Schedden praised Rickards' performance stating that the season offered the actress "a wider range of both drama and comedy, and she rose to the challenge". Writing in 2014, Mark Rozeman of Paste Magazine called Felicity "one of the best characters on TV". Reviewing the show's third season DVD release for Den of Geek, Rob Leane acknowledged the popularity of the character, and praised Rickards' performance, but questioned whether that popularity, and her resulting prominence, at times distracted from the narrative of the show as a whole. Conner Schwerdtfeger of Cinemablend stated that Arrow " owes much of its success" to the character and to Rickards, when welcoming Mark Guggenheim's assertion that season four would see more of Felicity's 'lighter side' following a darker season three for the character. Writing for Collider in 2016, Craig Byrne described Felicity, and Rickards, as "one of the best revelations of Arrow", stating that in Arrow's formative stages "it was her character that really made a lot of people take notice". However, he also expressed concern that the show had become too reliant on both Felicity and the relationship between her and Oliver.

Similar concerns were expressed by Caroline Schlafly, writing for TV Overmind in 2016, who felt that at times the show gave too much focus to Felicity. In an editorial for Rotten Tomatoes in 2017, Erik Amaya included Felicity in his list of 'Underrated Comic Book Characters', describing her as "bringing much needed light" to Arrow. He also credited the character as the inspiration for the creation "of a specific support class within The CW's superhero shows". Writing in 2019 following Rickards decision to step away from the Arrowverse at the end of Arrow's seventh season Sam Stone, of CBR.com, described Felicity as a "crucial part of Team Arrow", praising Rickards "laudable" performance and lamenting the loss of the character for the show's final season. These sentiments were echoed by Chancellor Agard of Entertainment Weekly. Discussing Rickard's best performances as Felicity across the previous seven seasons, he called Felicity "an integral part of Arrow", stating it would be "hard to imagine" what the show would have looked like without the character, and in his preview of Arrow's final season, described her as "Team Arrow's heart". Writing a retrospective of the character ahead of the season seven finale following Rickards decision to leave the show, Lucy Baugher of Collider called her "the glue that holds Arrow together", stating "it seems almost impossible to imagine Arrow without her".

The speech delivered by Felicity in the season six Arrow episode "We Fall" won particular praise from critics. In her review of the episode, Allison Shoemaker of The A.V. Club called the scene "exceptional" and one of the most "thoughtful and compelling" sequences in the show's history, praising Rickards delivery and describing it as an "unabashedly romantic scene, but one that's based in a long, fraught history. It's a speech given by a woman whose experience, wisdom, and faith are hard fought". In Shoemaker's review of the season as a whole, she included it as one of the best scenes in both the season and the entire series. Entertainment Weekly included the scene in its 'Superhero Insider' moments of the week, saying it was "built on six seasons worth of history and that's conveyed in the writing and Rickards' excellent performance". TVLine described the speech as "wonderful" and "convincing", praising Rickards for her "warm looks and her physicality" in delivery. Della Harrington of Den of Geek similarly described Felicity's faith in Oliver as "actually pretty moving". Chancellor Agard of Entertainment Weekly included the episode in his list of Rickards' "10 best Arrow episodes", citing both her performance and Wendey Stanzler's direction as reasons for its resonance.

=== Accolades ===
All awards and nominations are for Emily Bett Rickards's performance as Felicity Smoak in Arrow, unless otherwise noted in the Category column:

Year	Award	Category	Result	Ref(s)
2013	UBCP/ACTRA Awards	Best Newcomer	Nominated	
2014	Leo Awards	Best Lead Performance by a Female in a Dramatic Series	Nominated	
2014	Teen Choice Awards	Female Breakout Star	Nominated	
2015	Leo Awards	Best Guest Performance by a Female in a Dramatic Series (The Flash)	Nominated	
2015	Leo Awards	Best Lead Performance by a Female in a Dramatic Series	Nominated	
2015	MTV Fandom Awards	Ship of the Year (with Stephen Amell)	Won	
2015	Teen Choice Awards	Choice TV Actress – Fantasy/Sci-Fi	Nominated	
2015	Teen Choice Awards	Choice TV Liplock (with Stephen Amell)	Nominated	
2016	Leo Awards	Best Lead Performance by a Female in a Dramatic Series	Nominated	
2016	MTV Fandom Awards	Ship of the Year (with Stephen Amell)	Won	
2016	Teen Choice Awards	Choice TV Actress – Fantasy/Sci-Fi	Nominated	
2016	Teen Choice Awards	Choice TV Liplock (with Stephen Amell)	Nominated	
2017	Leo Awards	Best Lead Performance by a Female in a Dramatic Series	Nominated	
2017	Teen Choice Awards	Choice TV Actress – Action	Nominated	
2018	Teen Choice Awards	Choice TV Actress – Action	Nominated	
2018	Teen Choice Awards	Choice TV Ship (with Stephen Amell)	Nominated	
2019	Teen Choice Awards	Choice TV Actress – Action	Nominated	

== Other media ==
=== Promotional tie-ins ===
In 2013, Felicity (again portrayed by Rickards), appeared in the promotional tie-in web series for Arrow, entitled Blood Rush. A six-episode miniseries, the story follows Felicity after she is informed by Quentin Lance (Paul Blackthorne) that SCPD has obtained blood samples belonging to the Arrow. She enlists the help of Roy Harper (Colton Haynes) to steal them back, to protect Oliver's identity. The events of the series take place between the fifth and sixth episodes of Arrow season two. The series was presented by Bose, and featured product placement for their products.

In 2016 the CW released a short promo entitled Superhero Fight Club 2.0, which featured Arrowverse superheroes Green Arrow, Flash, Supergirl, White Canary, Atom and Firestorm, fighting in a simulator, observed by Felicity, Cisco Ramon, John Diggle, and Martian Manhunter.

=== Print media ===
DC announced in September 2012 that they would be publishing a tie-in comic to accompany the series, to be released initially as digital chapters, and then published as monthly print issues, collecting together a number of the chapters in each issue. Felicity featured in several chapters of the series; these were later included in the graphic novel Arrow: Volume 2, which was the second of two volumes collating all the original chapters.

Felicity also features in the Arrow: Season 2.5 digital tie-in comics, which bridge the gap between the second and third seasons of the television show. She went on to feature in The Flash: Season Zero tie-in comics, which link to the first season of The Flash. The character appears in several issues, most prominently in "Smoak Signals" parts 1 and 2.

In November 2019, DC announced that they would be producing two tie-in comic books, to accompany the Crisis on Infinite Earths crossover event. These include a storyline running concurrently to the on-screen episodes, focusing on the characters of Felicity, The Ray, Nyssa Al Ghul and Wally West. The first comic book was released in December 2019, with the second released in January 2020.

She is also one of the protagonists of the tie-in novels published for the series. Arrow: Vengeance, written by Oscar Balderrama and Lauren Certo was published in 2016, the same year as The Flash: The Haunting of Barry Allen written by Susan and Clay Griffith, with its sequel Arrow: A Generation of Vipers from the same authors published in 2017. Later in 2017, Arrow: Fatal Legacies, co-authored by Marc Guggenheim and James R. Tuck was published, a novel which bridged the gap between the season five finale and the season six premiere of Arrow. Felicity also features in Barry Lyga's Crossover Crisis trilogy. Published by Abrams Books, the series is aimed at middle-grade readers, and is set on an alternate earth. The first novel, The Flash: Green Arrow's Perfect Shot, was published in 2019, followed by The Flash: Supergirl's Sacrifice in May 2020 with The Flash: Legends of Forever published in March 2021.

The character also features in the two published companion guides to the Arrow, both written by Nick Aires and published by Titan Books. Arrow: Heroes and Villains, published in 2015, profiles characters featured in the series in seasons one and two. Arrow: Oliver Queen's Dossier, published in 2016, is presented as a series of documents compiled by Felicity and Oliver, including classified government documents, weapon schematics, news reports, police records and profiles of both their allies and foes.

In 2014, the comics version of Felicity Smoak was reintroduced in the series Green Arrow, part of the New 52. Introduced in Green Arrow #35, this version of the character is loosely based on Arrow's version and resembles Rickards's portrayal. A younger version of the character, again resembling Rickards, was introduced by Marguerite Bennett in her DC Comics Bombshells and Bombshells United comics run, set in an alternate history.

=== Video games ===
The character appears in the 2014 game Lego Batman 3: Beyond Gotham as part of the Arrow DLC pack, released in January 2015. As well as featuring in the add-on pack's level, Felicity can also be used in any other level as a freeplay character.

In the 2017 game Injustice 2, Felicity is referenced in an easter egg. When facing each other in combat, if the Flash manages to take out the first bar of Green Arrow's health, he states; "That's for breaking Felicity's heart".

=== Merchandising ===
In February 2015, DC Collectibles announced the release of a second series of Arrow and The Flash action figures, which included a Felicity Smoak toy with detachable hands. In August, Funko Pop announced that they would be releasing a new range of Vinyl figures, to also include a Felicity Smoak doll, following the initial release of four Arrow figures in May of the same year.
