= Lisa Smith =

Lisa Smith may refer to:

- Lisa Marie (actress) (Lisa Marie Smith, born 1968), American model and actress
- L. J. Smith (author) (Lisa Jane Smith) (1958–2025), American author
- Lisa F. Smith (Ed.D received 1993), US-New Zealand education academic
- Lisa Smith, member of grunge band Dickless
- Lisa Smith (soldier) (born 1981), Irish soldier
