= Pan-European Network Service =

Telecommunications network

The Pan-European Network Service (PENS) is a telecommunications network established (in 2009) by several European Air Navigation Service Providers with support of EUROCONTROL with a view to build transport infrastructure.

PENS do provide a common IP-based network service across the European region covering voice and data communication and providing efficient support to existing services and new requirements that are emerging from future Air Traffic Management (ATM) concepts.
On 14 January 2016, EUROCONTROL hosted a major meeting to move forward with the implementation of NewPENS. NewPENS, which will build on the success of the current Pan-European Network Services (PENS) infrastructure, aims to become the means of ground-to-ground communication for all connections between all ATM stakeholders across Europe.

== See also ==
- Pan European Networks (marketing agency)
