= KDVS =

Radio station at the University of California, Davis

- Davis, California; United States
- Broadcast area: Central Valley
- Frequency: 90.3 MHz

Programming
- Language: English
- Format: Free-form radio
- Affiliations: Pacifica Radio

Ownership
- Owner: University of California, Davis

History
- First air date: January 2, 1968
- Former call signs: KCD (carrier current)
- Call sign meaning: Davis

Technical information
- Licensing authority: FCC
- Facility ID: 69345
- Class: B1
- ERP: 13,000 watts
- HAAT: 56 meters (184 ft)
- Transmitter coordinates: 38°35′47″N 121°40′49″W

Links
- Public license information: Public file; LMS
- Webcast: Listen live (via TuneIn)
- Website: kdvs.org

KDVS (90.3 FM) is a student-run college and community radio station based in Davis, California. Featuring a free-form radio format, the station is owned by Regents of the University of California. Broadcasting at 13,000 watts, it is one of the most powerful free-form university-based radio stations in the United States.

== History ==
The idea for starting KDVS was conceived by students in the former Beckett-Hughes dormitories in late 1963. Using the call letters KCD and 880 AM as the frequency, the students "broadcast" their first program on February 1, 1964, from a laundry room in Beckett Hall. The station's signal, which was transmitted by telephone lines, could only reach certain dorms.

Two years later, in 1966, KCD and the university's student government, Associated Students of UC Davis, joined in applying for a Class D noncommercial broadcast license. The FCC awarded the license to the university on October 18, 1967. By then, the station had moved to the newly constructed Memorial Union, where its inaugural broadcast was aired on January 2, 1968, under the call letters KDVS.

Initially, KDVS had 10 watts and broadcast on 91.5 FM in mono. In 1971, the station's signal was upgraded to stereo, but a far more significant development occurred six years later. In 1977, during a period when the FCC was forcing Class D stations to either upgrade or go silent, KDVS received a power increase to 5,000 watts and moved to its current frequency 90.3 FM. Two additional power increases were approved by the FCC over the years: 9,200 watts in 1983 and 13,000 watts in 2013. The latter increase enabled the station to cover most of Sacramento, as well as portions of Placer, El Dorado, and Solano counties.

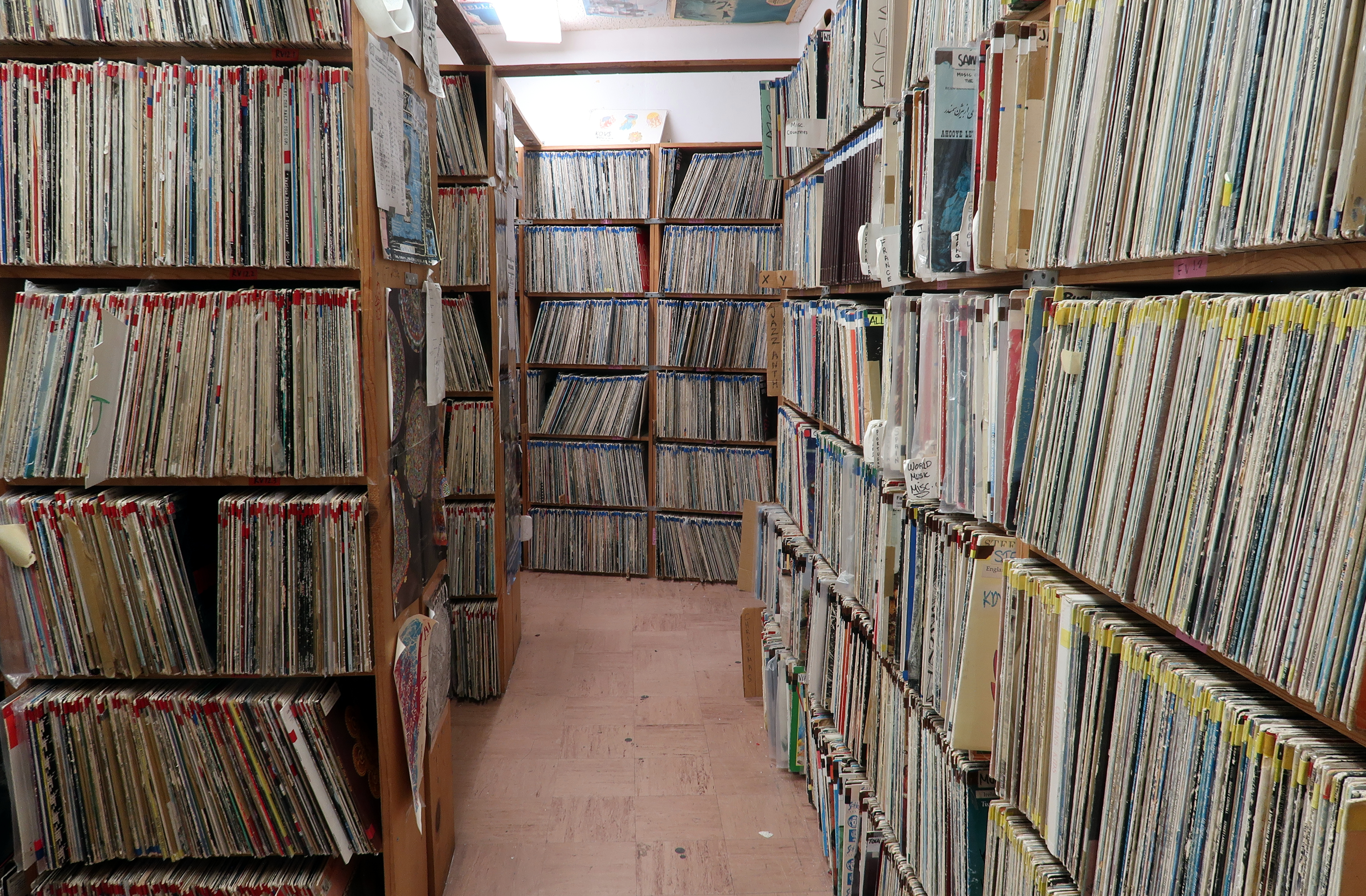
Vinyl records in The Stacks, Lower Freeborn Hall

As of 2026, the station's media collection, known as The Stacks, holds approximately 150,000 pieces of physical media.

== Additional developments ==
A free newsletter entitled KDViationS, written and composed by the volunteer staff of the radio station, is published quarterly. The station also produces This Week in Science, which is broadcast live but is known primarily in podcast form. KDVS is also the home of the public affairs programs Radio Parallax and Dr. Andy's Poetry and Technology Hour.

In summer 2006, KDVS started the non-profit record label KDVS Recordings to promote independent artists in the Davis and Sacramento areas.

== Notable station alumni ==
Several now-famous artists were members of the KDVS staff in their early years. Former KDVS DJs include DJ Shadow, Lyrics Born, Gift of Gab and Chief Xcel of Blackalicious, Steve Wynn of The Dream Syndicate, and Kendra Smith of both The Dream Syndicate and Opal.

== Gallery ==
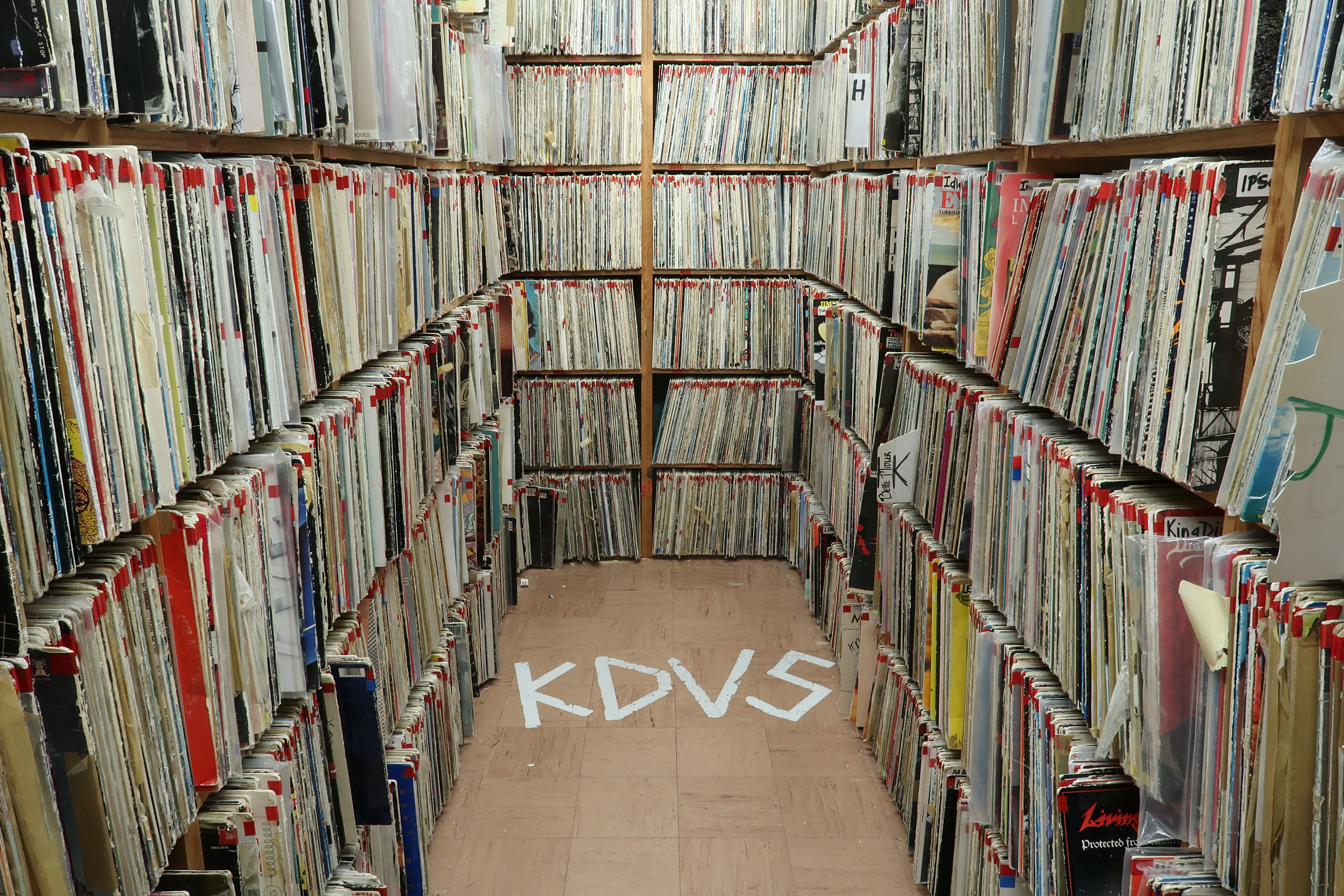
A labeled nook within The Stacks

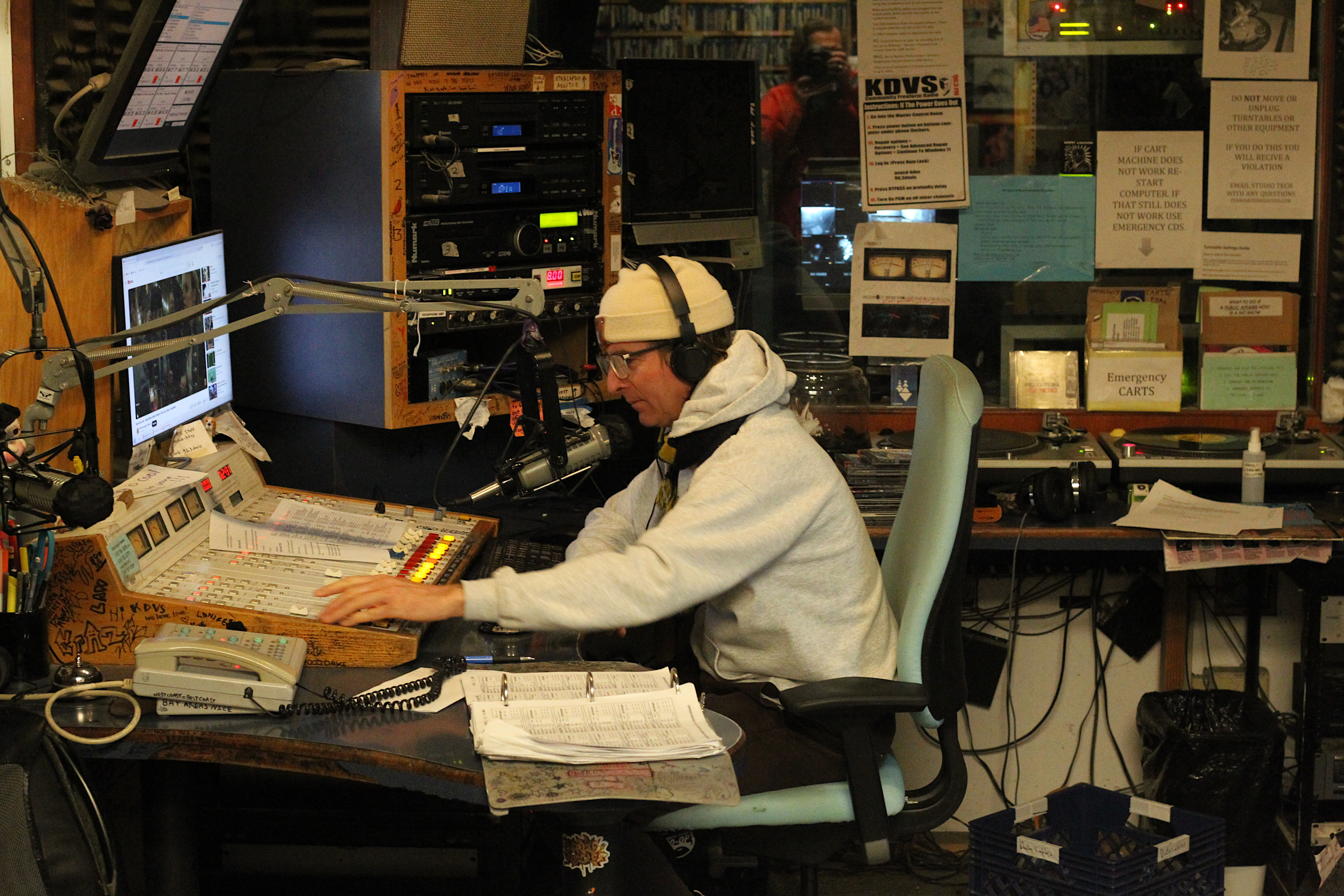
DJ Dog Juice on air with Surf And More

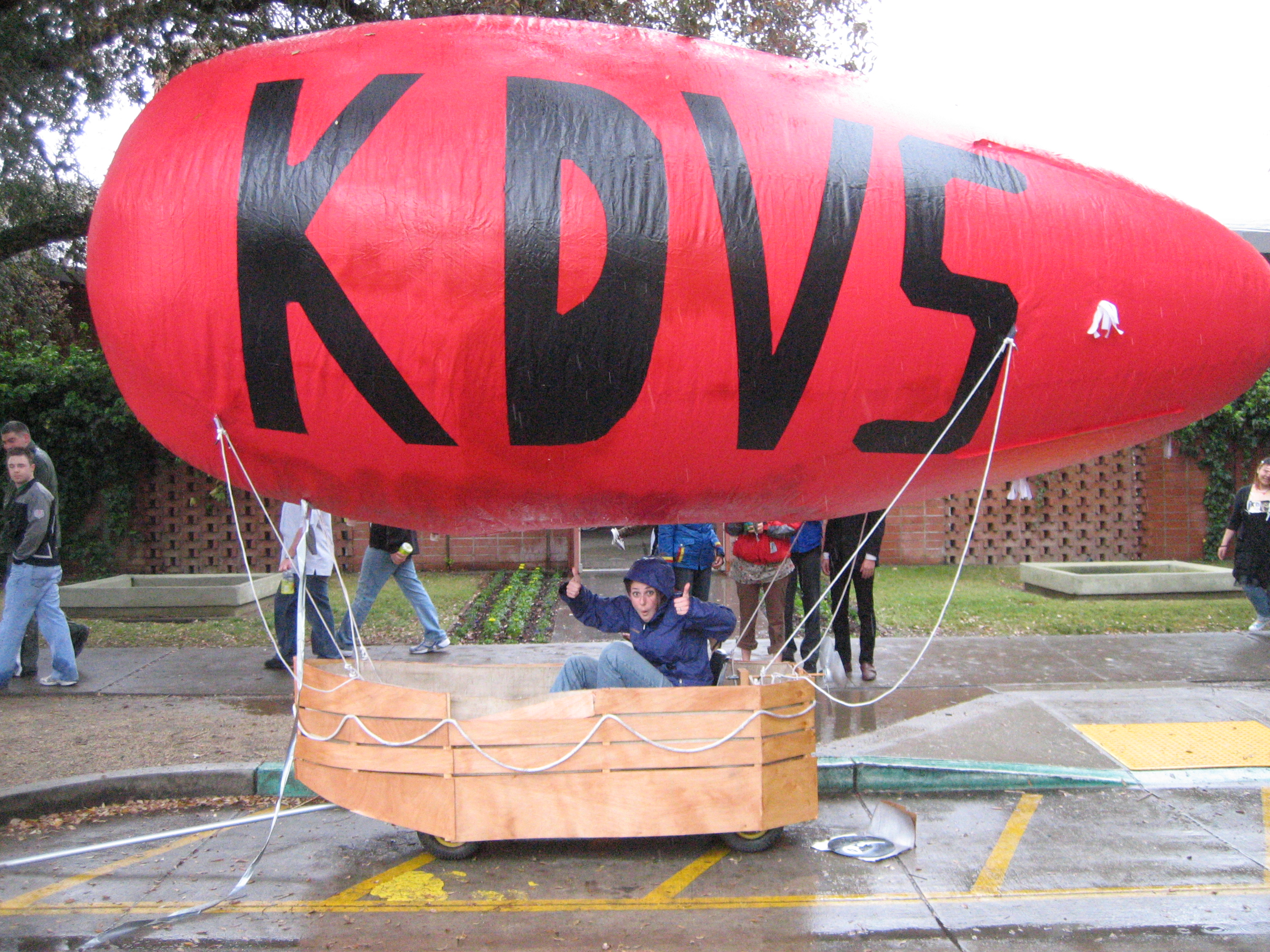
KDVS Picnic Day Float

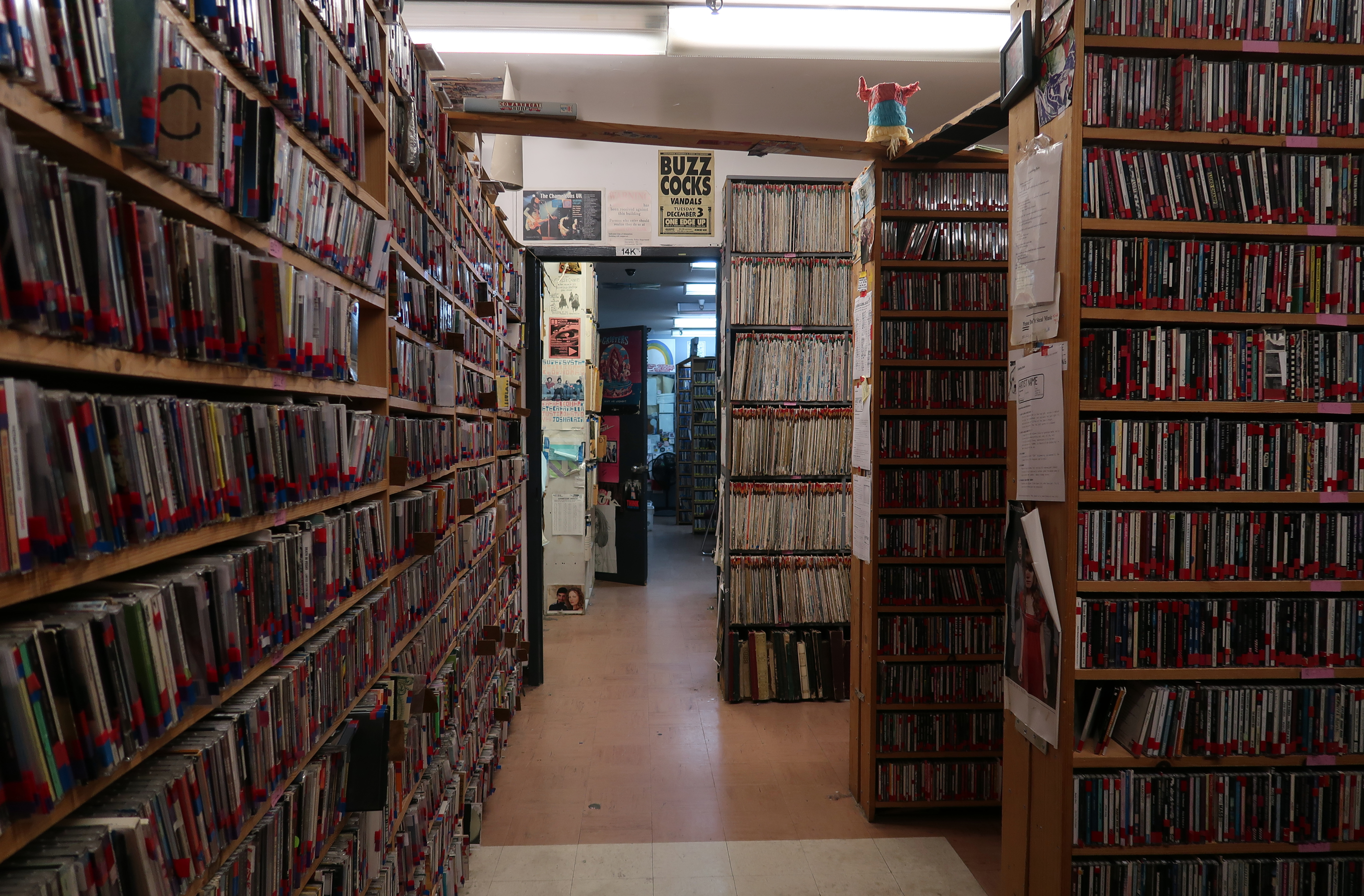
A portion of CD media collection

== See also ==
- Campus radio
- List of college radio stations in the United States
- List of community radio stations in the United States
