= Felicity Smoak =

- Felicity Smoak as depicted in Green Arrow vol. 5 #35 (December 2014). Art by Daniel Sampere.

Publication information
- Publisher: DC Comics
- First appearance: The Fury of Firestorm #23 (May 1984)
- Created by: Gerry Conway (writer); Rafael Kayanan (artist)

In-story information
- Species: Human
- Partnerships: Firestorm; Green Arrow

Felicity Smoak is a fictional character appearing in comics published by DC Comics. Her first appearance was in The Fury of Firestorm #23 (May 1984), created by writer Gerry Conway and artist Rafael Kayanan. She was originally the manager of a computer software firm who opposed the superhero Firestorm (Ronnie Raymond) because of his recklessness, eventually becoming the second wife of Edward Raymond and Ronnie's stepmother.

A re-imagined Felicity Smoak, portrayed by Emily Bett Rickards, featured in the television series Arrow and its extended universe of shows, collectively known as the Arrowverse. An I.T. genius and graduate from MIT, Felicity works alongside vigilante Oliver Queen/Green Arrow to help protect Star City (formerly Starling City), later operating under the alias Overwatch. The pair also become romantically involved, and eventually marry with Felicity giving birth to their daughter Mia Smoak. This interpretation of the character was placed at number 15 in a list of 50 Favorite Female Characters, in a poll of Hollywood professionals conducted by The Hollywood Reporter in 2016. The Arrowverse incarnation of Felicity serves as inspiration for the version of the character who appears in The New 52 continuity reboot.

== Fictional character biography ==
=== The Fury of Firestorm ===
Felicity Smoak in The Fury of Firestorm.

Felicity Smoak is introduced as the supervisor of a New York computer software firm. She threatens to sue Firestorm after he inadvertently damages several computers during a battle with Bug and Byte, causing millions of dollars in property damage and threatening the firm. Felicity makes recurring appearances, often taking an adversarial role against Firestorm and making a point of explaining what the collateral damage of his battles cost her and other civilians. Firestorm later lashes out against Felicity by transforming her clothes into soap. Humiliated, Felicity sues him.

Felicity develops a romantic relationship with Ed Raymond, unaware that Ed's son Ronnie is Firestorm. When Ronnie discovers that Felicity is seeing his father, he is uncertain how to treat her due to their past interactions. Over time, Felicity and Ed fall in love and are married. After the wedding, Felicity learns Ronnie's secret identity. By this point, she has forgiven him for his past transgressions, although she continues to remind him of the importance of using his superpowers in a responsible manner.

When Ronnie Raymond is killed by Shadow Thief, Felicity is called to testify against Shadow Thief in court. Alongside Ed Raymond, she explains her history with Ronnie and how she learned that Ronnie had been Firestorm, choosing to make Ronnie's identity public knowledge.

=== The New 52 ===
DC Comics rebooted its comic properties in 2011 as part of a relaunch entitled The New 52, in which Felicity Smoak was revamped to be similar to her Arrowverse counterpart. The New 52 version of Felicity Smoak is introduced in 2014 in Green Arrow #35, written by Arrow showrunner Andrew Kreisberg. In #35, she is introduced in an end-of-issue cliffhanger as an assassin out to kill Oliver, but quickly explains that while she is a hacker-for-hire who has "done questionable things" in her past, "leading a hero to his death isn't one of them", explaining she did not know her target was Green Arrow when she accepted the job. After proving her hacker credentials by explaining to him that she knows his secret identity, as well as highly specific details from his superhero, personal, professional and family lives, she offers to become a part of his team out of a desire to help him save the city. Surmising that whoever hired her to kill Oliver has evil plans, she teams up with Green Arrow to track down her client's other target, Mia Dearden, who they discover is being pursued by Merlyn.

Later in the same storyline, Felicity is arrested and placed in a supermax prison, where she shares a cell with Cheetah; it is established that Felicity had once been hired to dox Cheetah, putting the villain and her loved ones in danger. Oliver saves her from Cheetah with help from Steve Trevor. Oliver saves Mia from the man pursuing her and her father John King. Oliver also exposes him as a murderer who used bribery and corruption to control Seattle.

== Other versions ==
Felicity in DC Bombshells.

In an alternate history version of World War II depicted in DC Comics Bombshells, a young Felicity Smoak and her family are evicted from their house in Gotham City by their landlord because they are illegally taking care of their relatives, who fled Europe. The Batgirls come to the rescue, saving the Smoak family and all their belongings. Felicity and her family are later moved to a safe house, with Felicity joining the Batgirls.

== In other media ==
=== Arrowverse ===
Emily Bett Rickards as Felicity Smoak in Arrow, as she appeared during her debut in the first-season episode "Lone Gunmen".

==== Live-action ====
Felicity Smoak appears in the Arrowverse, portrayed by Emily Bett Rickards. Introduced in Arrow, this version is an I.T. genius, skilled hacker and computer expert, and graduate of M.I.T. She joins Oliver Queen on his vigilante mission, and later founds her own company, Smoak Technologies. Oliver and Felicity begin a romantic relationship which eventually leads to their marriage and the birth of their daughter Mia Smoak. The character was originally introduced in the episode "Lone Gunmen" as a one-off character. Due to the positive reaction from Green Arrow actor Stephen Amell and producer Peter Roth, the character was promoted to a recurring, later main, role. The character also appears in The Flash, Legends of Tomorrow, Vixen, the crossover event "Crisis on Earth-X", and the web series Blood Rush. Rickards left Arrow at the end of its seventh season, but returned as a guest star for the series finale "Fadeout".

==== Print media ====
Felicity features in the digital tie-in comics to the Arrowverse series, Arrow Season 2.5, Flash Season Zero, and in Smoak Signals parts 1 and 2. She is one of the four protagonists of the two tie-in comics produced to accompany the Arrowverse crossover event Crisis on Infinite Earths, released in December 2019 and January 2020 respectively. She is also one of the protagonists in the Arrowverse tie-in novels, Arrow: Vengeance, written by Oscar Balderrama and Lauren Certo, The Flash: The Haunting of Barry Allen written by Susan and Clay Griffith, and its sequel Arrow: A Generation of Vipers as well as Arrow: Fatal Legacies, co-authored by Marc Guggenheim and James R. Tuck. Felicity also features in Barry Lyga's Crossover Crisis trilogy published in 2019, in May 2020 and in March 2021.

==== Video games ====
Felicity Smoak appears in Lego Batman 3: Beyond Gotham as part of the Arrow DLC pack.
