= Lisa F. Smith =

US-New Zealand education academic

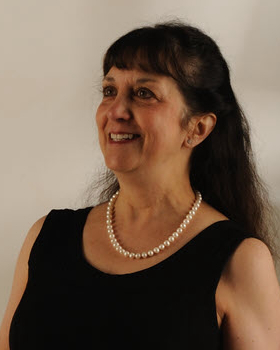
- Smith in 2009
- Education: Rutgers University
- Scientific career
- Workplaces: University of Otago
- Thesis: The effects of motivation and anxiety on test performance (1993)

Lisa F. Smith (formerly Wolf) is a US-New Zealand education academic. She has been emeritus professor at the University of Otago since 2019.

== Academic career ==
Smith attended Rutgers University in New Jersey for a 1993 Ed.D. titled 'The effects of motivation and anxiety on test performance' before working in New Jersey and New York, both teaching and researching in museums (including The Met) with her partner Jeffrey K. Smith. The pair moved to the University of Otago in 2005, both rising to full professor. Notable students include Kimberly Arcand.

In addition to her museum work, much of Smith's research involves visual perception in a learning context and creativity.

== Selected works ==
- Smith, Jeffrey K., and Lisa F. Smith. "Spending time on art." Empirical Studies of the Arts 19, no. 2 (2001): 229–236.
- Locher, Paul J., Jeffrey K. Smith, and Lisa F. Smith. "The influence of presentation format and viewer training in the visual arts on the perception of pictorial and aesthetic qualities of paintings." Perception 30, no. 4 (2001): 449–465.
- Smith, Jeffrey K., and Lisa F. Smith. "Educational creativity." The Cambridge handbook of creativity (2010): 250–264.
- Smith, Lisa F., and Jeffrey K. Smith. "The Nature and Growth of Aesthetic Fluency." (2006).
- Wolf, Lisa F., and Jeffrey K. Smith. "The consequence of consequence: Motivation, anxiety, and test performance." Applied Measurement in Education 8, no. 3 (1995): 227–242.
- Lisa F. Smith, Jeffrey K. Smith, Kimberly K. Arcand, Randall K. Smith, Jay Bookbinder, Kelly Keach (09/2010) *Aesthetics and Astronomy: Studying the Public's Perception and Understanding of Imagery from Space* Science Communication Journal doi 10.1177/1075547010379579
