= Kiki Sanford =

American science communicator

Kirsten H. Sanford
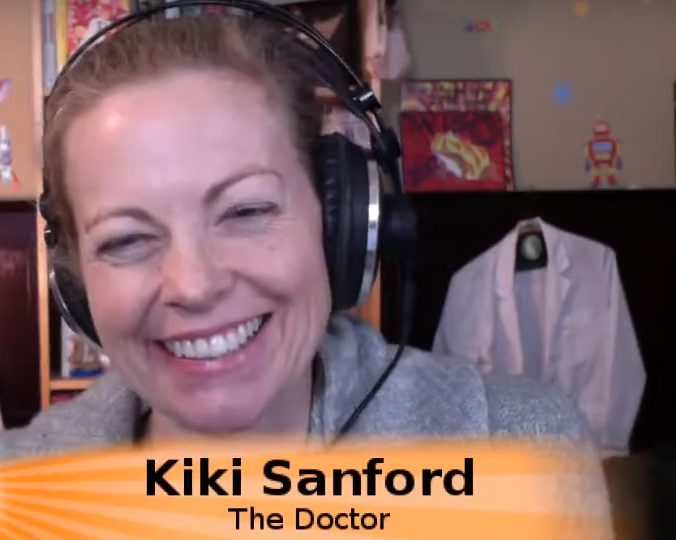
- Sanford in 2016 on This Week in Science
- Born: 1974 or 1975 (age 51–52); Santa Rosa, California, U.S.
- Other name: Dr. Kiki
- Education: University of California, Davis (BS, PhD)
- Known for: This Week in Science podcast
- Website: www.kirstensanford.com

Kirsten "Kiki" Sanford is an American neurophysiologist and science communicator. After working at the University of California, Davis as a research scientist, she left research work to pursue a career in science communication. Her work has included multiple audio and video programs, including the This Week in Science radio program and podcast and Dr. Kiki's Science Hour, a podcast involving interviews with experts in a given scientific field.

== Personal life ==
Sanford was born in Santa Rosa, California and raised near Stockton, California. She holds a B.S. in conservation biology and Ph.D. in Molecular, Cellular, and Integrative Physiology from U.C. Davis. She is a specialist in learning and memory. While attending graduate school at U.C. Davis, she found academic bureaucracy unappealing and decided to shift her career path from research to science communication. Sanford holds a black belt in taekwondo. She says martial arts was "something concrete to escape to" when faced with research hardships during graduate school. Sanford lived in San Francisco with her husband until moving to Portland, Oregon in April 2015.

== Science communication ==
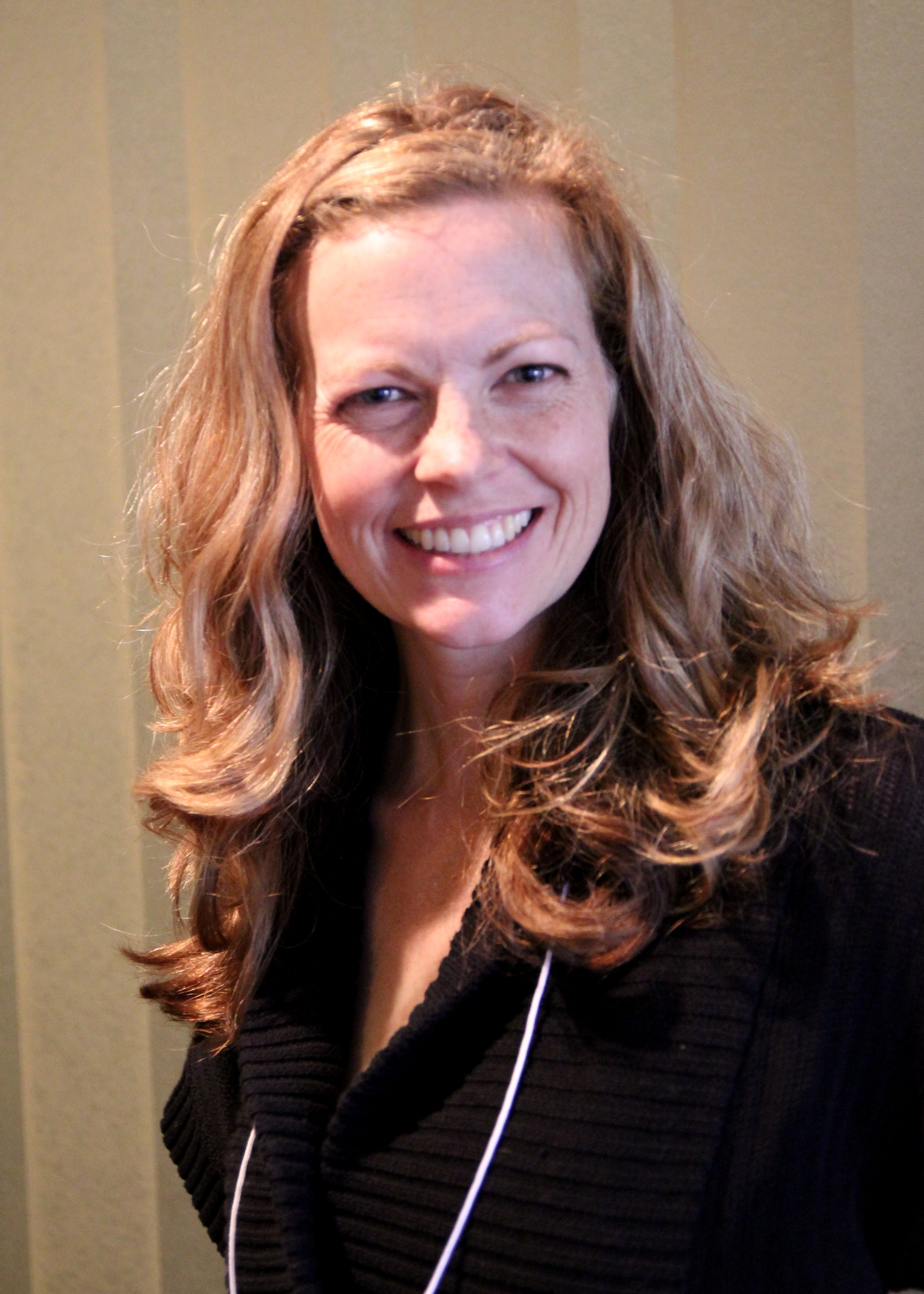
Sanford podcasts at SkeptiCal - Berkeley, CA - April 21, 2012

Sanford, known as "Dr. Kiki," produces and appears in a number of science education programs. Sanford says of her work, "My shtick is: Dr. Kiki reaches out to people who don't necessarily like science to get them to see it as something enjoyable. My goal is to get people who maybe flunked chemistry or didn't do well on their science fair project to say, 'This is really interesting.'"

Sanford is the host and editor of the This Week in Science radio show/podcast, which she founded in 1999. This Week in Science is a weekly program formerly streamed live from the This Week in Tech Network (TWiT), and then rebroadcast from U.C. Davis' KDVS, 90.3 FM. This Week in Science currently records every Wednesday night using Hangouts on Air which are streamed live on both YouTube and the This Week in Science live page.

Starting in late 2007, Sanford expanded her work, starring in On Network's successful series Food Science. The program explores the science of cooking as well as at-home experiments involving food. In 2008, she began co-hosting Revision3's variety show PopSiren. PopSiren described itself as offering a "feminine perspective" on pop culture and technology.

In May 2008, Sanford along with several other skeptics and scientists created a pilot for a TV series titled The Skeptologists. The premise was that claimed experts in a field of pseudoscience or the paranormal would present their claims, which would then be investigated by the team.

On April 30, 2009, Dr. Kiki's Science Hour started broadcasting on TWiT.tv. The show, recorded live on TWiT, became a podcast with episode 24. Guests included scientists, skeptics, and science communicators such as astronomer Phil Plait and neurologist Steven Novella. The last episode aired on June 29, 2012. While at TWiT she also co-hosted Green Tech Today, a show about environmentally friendly technology, and Science News Weekly a five-minute show.

Sanford has produced and hosted various segments for The Science Channel's science program Brink.

In February 2015, Sanford launched a new company to help researchers and other scientists have better communication. The company, named Broader Impacts, does video production and social media outreach.

== Awards ==
In 2005, Sanford was awarded the American Association for the Advancement of Science Mass Media Science & Engineering Fellowship, in recognition for her work with her radio show This Week in Science. Through the fellowship she worked as a television news producer at WNBC News in New York City, alongside noted health and science reporter Max Gomez.
