= DC Comics Bombshells =

Line of figurines released by DC Collectibles and related comics

DC Comics Bombshells refers to a line of figurines released by DC Collectibles depicting DC Comics superheroines in a retro 1940s look based on designs by Ant Lucia. The line has further expanded to encompass their own comic book series as well as variant covers and various licensed memorabilia.

== Initial conception ==
The DC Comics Bombshells franchise began "in spring 2011 at a convention in Chicago where DC Collectibles found Ant Lucia's prints re-imaging DC superheroines as pin-up girls". World War II history, fashion, and air planes were studied to conceive the franchise. DC Comics worked with Udon Entertainment to produce illustrations. In fall 2011, four character designs of Wonder Woman, Stargirl, Poison Ivy, and Harley Quinn were used to pitch the idea of a nine-inch statue line. DC later asked Ant Lucia to redesign their initial conception of a retro Wonder Woman. Tim Miller was requested to handcraft the sculptures. In 2013, the first sculpture of the franchise, Wonder Woman, was sold in stores.

Ant Lucia, the creator of the sculptures' and variant covers' designs, drew a heavy influence from World War II aesthetics and pin-up models. He juxtaposed past pin up girl designs with current rockabilly culture. The sculptures created a convergence between modern ideologies regarding feminine agency and nostalgia for the golden age of comics. The Bombshells variant covers were able to cultivate a coherent narrative by placing contemporary characters in the past. Ant Lucia details his process on detaching the characters from their current history and the construction of their new placement in World War II era: "In our initial conversations, we brainstorm on who this character is and if they were set in this period, what elements would make up their costume". The sculptures were able to pay homage to acclaimed images in America's 1940s cultural landscape. Wonder Woman's sculpture has noticeable similarities to Rosie the Riveter's famed iconic image. The similarities between the two icons is seen in both of the characters' bandanna pinned back hair and nearly identical color scheme of red, yellow and blue.

The American pop culture references of the sculptures become more tongue-in-cheek in Harley Quinn and the Joker's statue as to better reflect the former's explosive behavior. The Bombshells statue for Harley Quinn depicts her dressed in a World War II nurse's uniform. Harley Quinn is seen dipping a flustered, lipstick-stained Joker in an Sailor's uniform. The sculpture was a humorous rendition of the infamous "Kissing on VJ" photo where a sailor embraces a nurse in a moment of celebration.

== DC Collectibles statues ==
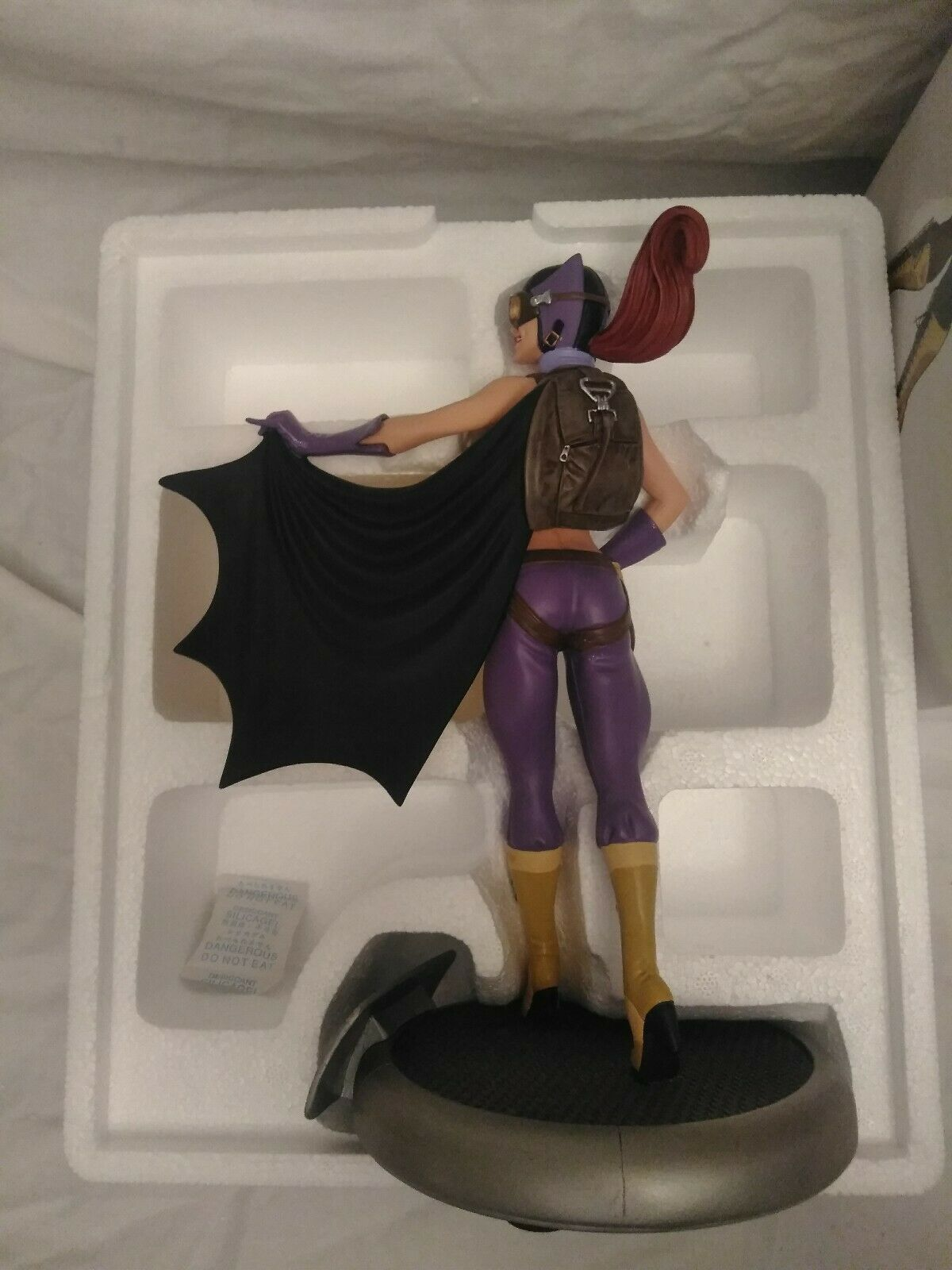
Batgirl, First Batch, one piece

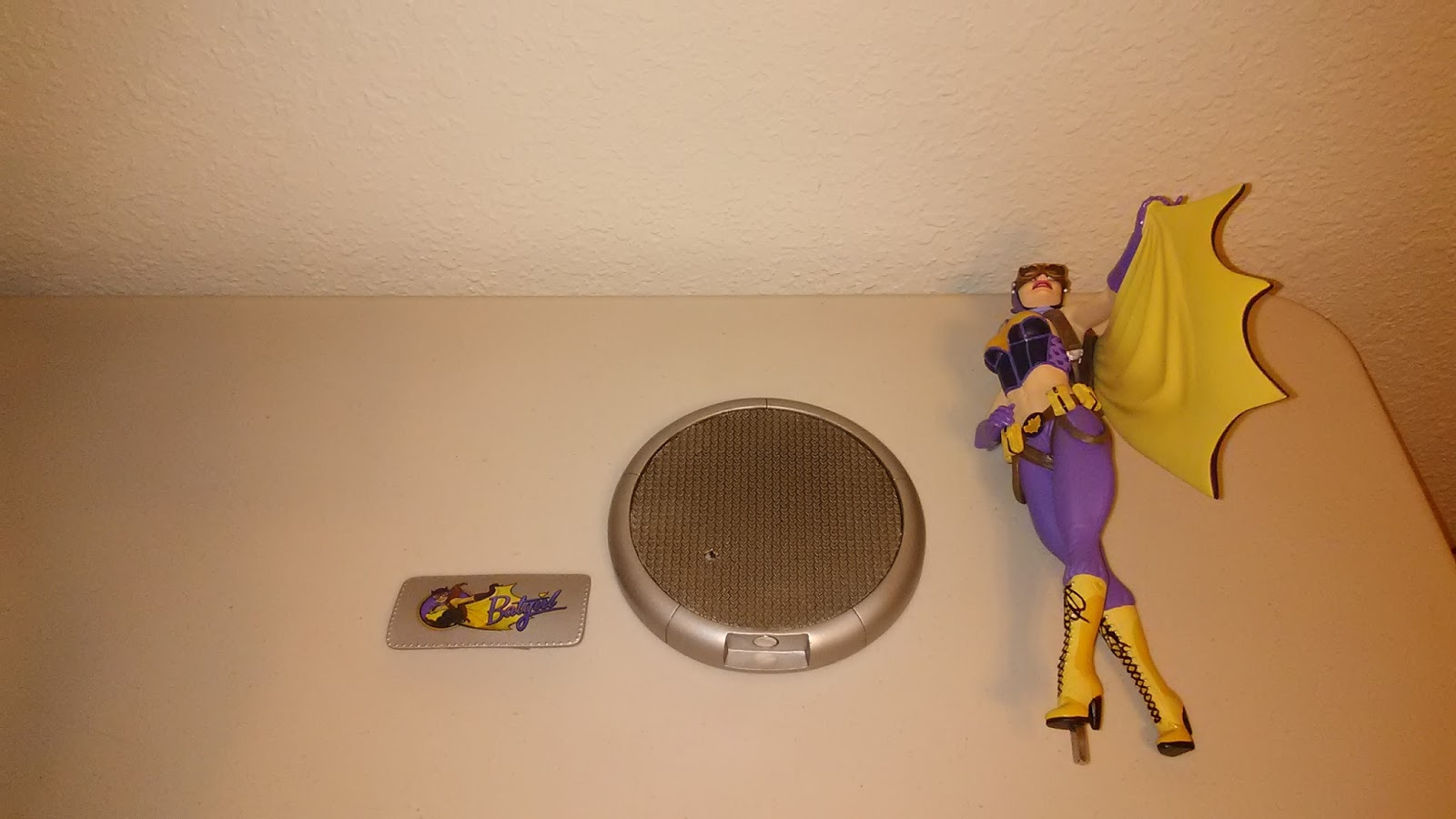
Batgirl, Second Batch, three separate pieces

The first statue was released in September 2013 with an initial assortment of twelve statues planned for the line. High interest in the line has meant that the line has continued beyond the initial twelve statues, with releases planned through 2019. The DC Collectibles statues have matching "steel plate" bases. The earliest statues were shipped with the nameplates attached to the bases; some statues were shipped as single solid pieces. DC, however, began using separate pieces attached with pegs or magnets due to a high percentage of damaged early statues. Between 2013 and 2016, the statues had Edition Sizes of 5200 (during DC's New 52 era). Beginning with 2017's Katana, the statues currently have Edition Sizes of 5000.

Character	Release date	Sculptor	Notes
Supergirl	September 2013	Tim Miller	Nameplate attached to base
Wonder Woman	October 2013	Tim Miller	Nameplate attached to base
Poison Ivy	October 2013	Tim Miller	First batch: nameplate attached to base; Vines C & D were separate pieces. Second batch: nameplate separate from base; Vines C & D were glued together.
Harley Quinn	December 2013	Tim Miller	Entire statue shipped as single piece
Batgirl	February 2014	Tim Miller	First batch shipped as single piece; second batch shipped with figure, nameplate, and base as separate pieces. Also, second batch does not have "beauty mark" on face.
Black Canary	June 2014	Sam Greenwell	First batch shipped as single piece; second batch shipped with figure, right arm, nameplate, and base as separate pieces.
Stargirl	August 2014	Tim Miller	Nameplate attached to base
Zatanna	December 2014	Tim Miller	Entire statue shipped as single piece
Harley Quinn (Holiday Variant)	December 2014	Tim Miller	In addition to being re-painted with holiday colors, character is holding a large bag instead of a gun in her left hand. First batched shipped as single piece; second batch shipped with figure, nameplate, and base as separate pieces.
Hawkgirl	February 2015	Tim Miller	N/A
Mera	May 2015	Tim Miller	N/A
Lois Lane	August 2015	Adam Ross	N/A
Catwoman	October 2015	James Marsano	N/A
Batwoman	October 2015	Tim Miller	N/A
Wonder Woman Holiday Variant	November 2015	Tim Miller	In addition to being re-painted with holiday colors, character is holding decorative lights instead of chains.
Harley Quinn & the Joker First Edition	December 2015	Tim Miller	Joker is wearing a black sailor suit.
Harley Quinn & the Joker Second Edition	March 2016	Tim Miller	Joker is wearing a purple sailor suit. Harley's hair is tipped with red and black and is wearing black and red socks instead of the white ones in the first edition.
Cheetah	June 2016	Sam Greenwell	N/A
Power Girl & Superman	August 2016	Jack Mathews	N/A
Batgirl Halloween Variant	September 2016	Tim Miller & Karen Palinko	In addition to being re-painted with Halloween colors, Palinko sculpted an entirely new head. The parachute backpack was changed to a coffin.
Killer Frost	October 2016	Tim Miller	N/A
Killer Frost (Sparkle Variant)	November 2016	Tim Miller	Edition Size 500; Local Comic Shop Day Variant available only to physical stores. The hat, skirt, and boots have glitter paint.
Bumblebee	November 2016	Tim Miller	N/A
Katana	February 2017	Jack Mathews	N/A
Jesse Quick	March 2017	Tim Miller & Karen Palinko	Palinko sculpted the face.
Raven	April 2017	Tim Miller	N/A
Aquaman	June 2017	Jack Mathews	N/A
Vixen	November 2017	Amy Sharpe	N/A
Starfire	January 2018	Jack Mathews	N/A
Green Lantern Jessica Cruz	April 2018	Jack Mathews	N/A
Joker's Daughter	October 2018	Tim Miller	Designed by Jim Fletcher instead of Ant Lucia.
Batman & Catwoman	November 2018	Jack Mathews	N/A
Harley Quinn (Sepia Variant)	February 2019	Tim Miller	Re-paint of previously released statue; different decoration on jacket back.
Big Barda	March 2019	Tim Miller	First Bombshells digitally sculpted by Miller (previous statues were sculpted by hand)
Batwoman "Away Team" Variant	April 2019	Tim Miller	Re-paint of previously released statue.
Poison Ivy Sepia Variant	May 2019	Tim Miller	Re-paint of previously released statue.
Black Canary Sepia Variant	November 2019	Tim Miller	Re-paint of previously released statue.
Shazam Mary	December 2019	Tim Miller	N/A
Death	January 2020	Tim Miller	N/A
Huntress (Helena Bertinelli)	May 2020	Tim Miller	N/A

=== Deluxe statues ===
The Deluxe statues have diorama-style bases instead of the shared "steel plate" bases of the regular statue line. Currently, they have Edition Sizes of 5000 each.

Character	Release date	Sculptor	Notes
Harley Quinn Deluxe	September 2017	Tim Miller	Custom "falling bomb" base
Wonder Woman Deluxe	July 2018	Chris Dahlberg	Custom "destroyed tank" base
Batgirl & Supergirl "Celebration"	September 2019	Tim Miller	Custom battlefield base
Harley Quinn Deluxe No. 2	September 2022	Tim Miller	Custom "high striker" base; designed by Emanuela Lupacchino

== Comic books ==
=== DC Comics Bombshells ===
Based on the increased interest in the property, a digital-first ongoing series written by Marguerite Bennett and various artists began in July 2015, with a printed comic book following in 12 August. The series ran for 100 digital issues, concluding in June 2017 and 33 print issues with the final issue release in August.

In her initial conception for building a narrative out of Ant Lucia's designs, Marguerite Bennett has stated: "We were able to retro-engineer this complete environment that lets them showcase their powers that lets them have good relationships and friendships that they wouldn't have been able to explore in another sphere....Going down to the smallest details that [Ant Lucia] puts into the statues and creating whole backstories for items". Bennett also speaks on her decision to incorporate mainstream canonical backstories of characters in this new world. Bennett explored traditional genres and mediums of the 1940s such as radio shows and propaganda films to provide a realistic history for the Bombshells franchise. Bennett speaks on this decision when she states: "Each of the heroines actually has, essentially, her own genre. Batwoman started off as this cheesy radio adventure reel, Wonder Woman is a war story, Supergirl is a propaganda film, Zatanna is this Hammer horror film, Catwoman is like a noir spy story". Bennett concludes and acknowledges the importance of the decision: "We were able to complete this whole new world that wasn't just one thing because no woman is just one thing. So they each got to have a distinct voice, a distinct personality". The foundation of feminist tones in the comic are seen in the structure of this atypical history as Bennett says: "We wanted to make a principle of the series to have the conceit that in this alternate history World War II the women came first. No heroine is derivative of a male counterpart. They are the heroes".

Title	Binding	Material collected	Publication date	ISBN
DC Comics Bombshells Volume 1: Enlisted	Trade paperback	DC Comics Bombshells #1–6 (Digital Chapters #1–18)	March 2, 2016	978-1-4012-6132-0
DC Comics Bombshells Volume 2: Allies	Trade paperback	DC Comics Bombshells #7–12 (Digital Chapters #19–36)	July 13, 2016	978-1-4012-6448-2
DC Comics Bombshells Volume 3: Uprising	Trade paperback	DC Comics Bombshells #13–18 (Digital Chapters #37–54)	March 15, 2017	978-1-4012-6877-0
DC Comics Bombshells Volume 4: Queens	Trade paperback	DC Comics Bombshells #19–24 (Digital Chapters #55–72)	June 21, 2017	978-1-4012-7407-8
DC Comics Bombshells Volume 5: The Death of Illusion	Trade paperback	DC Comics Bombshells #26-29; Annual #1 (Digital Chapters #76–90)	October 11, 2017	978-1-4012-7603-4
DC Comics Bombshells Volume 6: War Stories	Trade paperback	DC Comics Bombshells #25, 30-33 (Digital Chapters #73–75, 91-100)	March 28, 2018	978-1-4012-7602-7
DC Comics Bombshells The Deluxe Edition Book One	Hardcover	DC Comics Bombshells #1–6 (Digital Chapters #1–18)	August 29, 2018	1-4012-8168-0/978-1-4012-8168-7
DC Comics Bombshells The Deluxe Edition Book Two	Hardcover	DC Comics Bombshells #7–12 (Digital Chapters #19–36)	July 31, 2019	1-4012-9222-4/978-1-4012-9222-5

=== Bombshells United ===
A second digital-first series was launched on 25 August 2017 with the print release following on 6 September. Picking up from the end of the previous Bombshells series, the new series begins in 1943 with the Bombshells now back in America. Each arc focuses on a specific group of characters, with the first storyline introducing the Bombshells versions of Donna Troy and Cassie Sandsmark. The series was cancelled after 38 digital installments and 19 print issues.

The series is collected in trade paperbacks.

Title	Binding	Material collected	Publication date	ISBN
Bombshells United Volume 1: American Soil	Trade paperback	Bombshells United #1–6 (Digital Chapters #1–12)	June 27, 2018	1-4012-8023-4/978-1-4012-8023-9
Bombshells United Volume 2: War Bonds	Trade paperback	Bombshells United #7–12 (Digital Chapters #13–24)	October 17, 2018	1-4012-8472-8/978-1-4012-8472-5
Bombshells United Volume 3: Taps	Trade paperback	Bombshells United #13-19 (Digital Chapters #25–38)	February 27, 2019	1-4012-8826-X/978-1-4012-8826-6

=== Characters ===
Batwoman: In the 1930s, Kate Kane was an "adventurer". She kept her father's company afloat in the depression and fought in the Spanish Civil War with her then girlfriend, Renee Montoya. In 1940s, Kate is "The Batwoman" a vigilante inspiring hope in Gotham City. She was named after the bat and baseball uniform she uses to fight crime in. She is recruited by Amanda Waller to enlist in the Bombshells war effort.

Wonder Woman: Diana Prince was first introduced in the series as she disrupted an air raid between US troops and an unidentified opponent because they were causing unintentional harm to Themyscira. Diana soon meets Steve Trevor and cultivates a need to protect him from his impending execution for harming Themyscira. With the help of Mera, Aquawoman, Diana helps Steve escape. Diana soon joins the United States Army corps and fights against Germany.

Supergirl and Stargirl: Kortni Duginova and Kara Starikov were raised together as sisters after Kara's Kryptonian pod landed in Russia. Their parents believed they were "like the twin Goddesses-made where the sky met the Earth. We are blessed by the creatures of the Forest and the creatures of the sky, she says. Her little fallen stars". After their parents met unfortunate circumstances, Kortni and Kara lived in the Dormitory For Daughters of the Workers' Revolution and had dreams of flying for the Night Witches, "the most terrifying bombers of the Soviet Air Force". At an enlistment exam, Kara's Kryptonian powers were revealed and the sisters were turned into propaganda for Russia's war effort. Kara is described as "the wonder of Soviet science-the supergirl walks among us! A gift from the heavens, to favor the motherland in crushing her enemies" in a Russian newsreel. Kortni is described as "armed with the strength of the revolutionary soviet cosmonaut program—the Stargirl wields the cosmic staff. A design pioneered by comrade Ipati Dugin, the Stargirl's distinguished father".

Zatanna: In Germany, Zatanna is held captive by the Joker's Daughter. She performs in a cabaret singing songs embedded with her signature magic. Zatanna meets John Constantine and in order to save his life, she transforms him into a rabbit. Zatanna is forced to aid the Joker's Daughter by summoning a beast called the Tenebrus, who will bring about destruction. She conspires with Constantine on how to successfully revolt against Joker's Daughter, yet her affection for him is constantly used against her.

The Batgirls: Harper Row has a chance encounter with Batwoman where she aids in stopping a crime. Batwoman leaves Harper her Bat, which inspires Harper to form the Batgirls with her best friends and coworkers, Nell Little and Kathy Duquesne. The trio quickly grows in ranks as Bette Kane, Alysia Yeoh, and Felicity Smoak join them. The Batgirls stop corruption from running rampant in an orphanage to rescue Harper's brother Cullen and come across Tim Drake. They both join their ranks as well.

=== Variant covers ===
In June 2014, a selection of DC Comics monthly titles featured variant covers featuring the DC Comics Bombshells. This was repeated again in August 2015. The Bombshells variant covers were able to cultivate a coherent narrative that placed contemporary characters in the past. Ant Lucia details his process on detaching the characters from their current history and the construction of their new placement in the World War II era: "We brainstorm on who this character is and if they were set in this period, what elements would make up their costume. Obviously with Batgirl's mask- what would she actually use left to her own devices to create this style costume in that period? What would her persona be — maybe she is this pilot alter-ego superhero? We take a little time in thinking about who these characters are and who they might be in this alternate reality".

== Merchandise ==
Based on the success of the initial statues, the Bombshells designs were licensed out to a number of other companies for a range of merchandise. DC Collectibles released a set of three busts (Wonder Woman, Supergirl, and Mera) based on artwork by Emmanuela Lupacchino and sculpted by Jack Mathews. Another company, Icon Heroes, released a Bombshells Harley Quinn bust. Cryptozoic Entertainment has released a line of PVC statues based on the Bombshells designs, as well as Mystery-Box mini figurines titled 'Lil Bombshells. Funko has released a range of Bombshells figures in their POP! and Rock Candy lines and a wave of Mystery Mini figurines. The Tonner Doll Company has also released fashion dolls of Harley Quinn, Wonder Woman, Supergirl and Batwoman in their Bombshells designs.

=== Action figures ===
Based on the continuing success of the line, DC Collectibles later released a line of articulated action figures based on the DC Comics Bombshells line as part of their 'Designer Series' range of 6.75-inch figures. The first wave of figures was released in April 2017 and features Bombshells versions of Wonder Woman, Harley Quinn, Poison Ivy and Batwoman. A second wave was released in Fall 2017 and features Mera, Batgirl, Hawkgirl and Katana. The third wave consisting of Bumblebee and Supergirl was scheduled for release in early 2018, but was cancelled. A two-pack of Joker and Harley Quinn was slated for release in 2018, then re-solicited as single release figures for 2019 before again being cancelled. Prototypes of Black Canary and Zatanna figures have also been shown though remain unreleased.

=== Collectible pins ===
FanSets created three lines of Bombshell pins, which consist of Character line art, FanSets MicroCrew Style and Bombshell pin-ups. Several were done for special conventions.

=== Trading cards ===
In 2017, Cryptozoic released a Bombshells trading card set featuring cover arts and variants as well as portraits of characters from the series. Two subsequent sets were released in 2018 and 2019.

=== HeroClix ===
Several of the Bombshells were featured prominently in the DC HeroClix set Harley Quinn and the Gotham Girls, including Batgirl, Batwoman, Black Canary, Catwoman, Harley Quinn, Hawkgirl, Katana, Mera, Poison Ivy, Raven, Stargirl, Supergirl, Wonder Woman, and Zatanna.

== Video games ==
Infinite Crisis – alternate Bombshells costumes were added for Harley Quinn in February and Stargirl in March 2015.

DC Universe Online – DC Comics Bombshells content was added to the game in August 2015. The story mission The Bombshells Paradox sees the Bombshells version of Talia al Ghul cause a tear in reality and leads to the players interacting with the Bombshells versions of Wonder Woman, Supergirl, Harley Quinn, and Catwoman. Various cosmetic items based on the Bombshells look and a number of posters with Ant Lucia's original Bombshells artwork were also added to the game.
