= Vinita Marwaha Madill =

British Space Operations engineer and science communicator

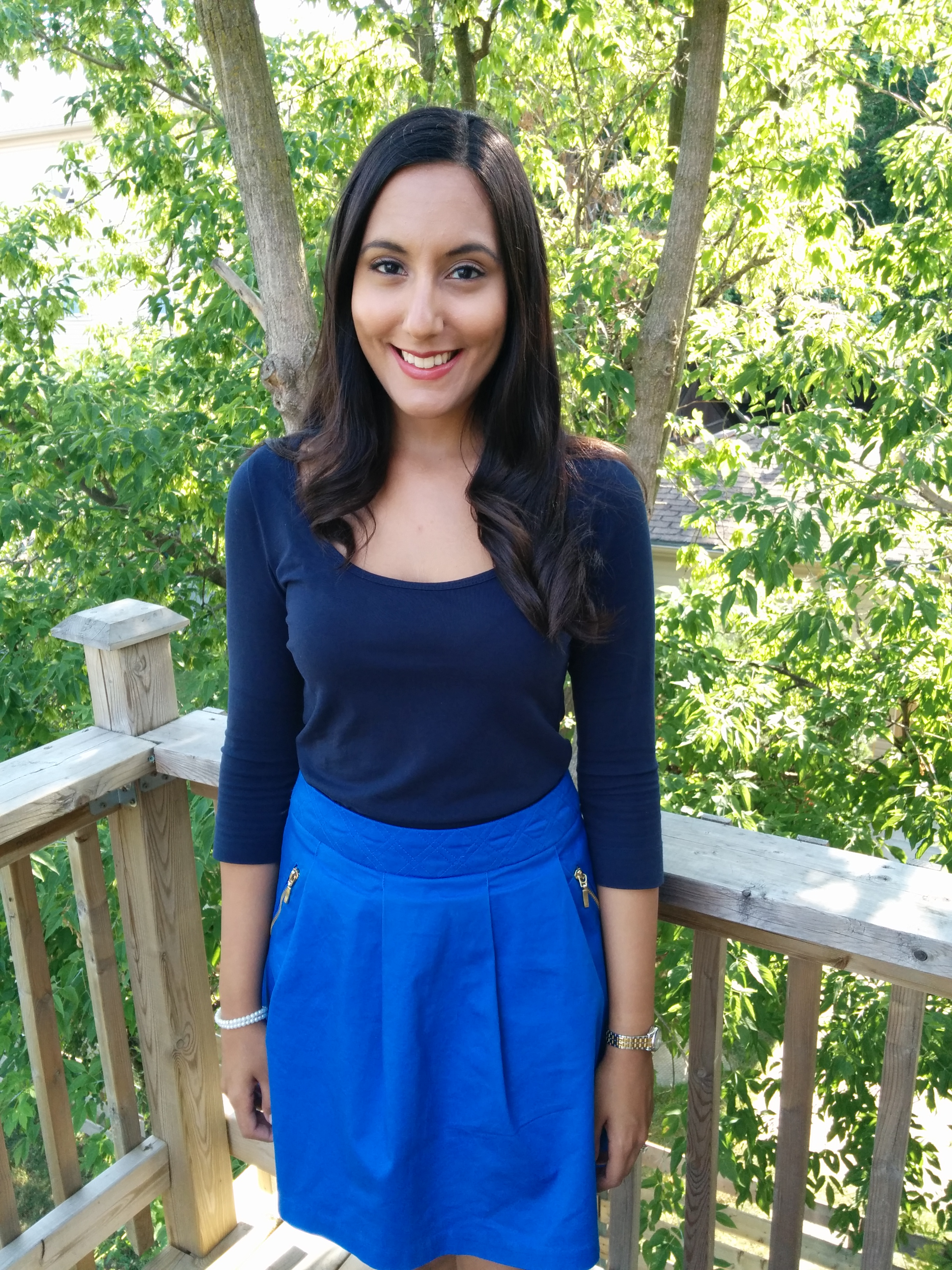
- Born: 9 January 1987 (age 39); Kingston upon Thames, England, UK
- Education: King's College London International Space University
- Employer: TERMA B.V. for European Space Agency
- Known for: Women in science advocacy Space engineering
- Website: http://rocket-women.com/

Vinita Marwaha Madill (born 9 January 1987) is a British Space Operations engineer and science communicator. She is based at the European Space Agency through TERMA B.V. in the Netherlands, where she is responsible for the development of the European Robotic Arm. She founded the platform Rocket Women, which uses stories and interviews to encourage women to study STEM.

== Early life and education ==
Marwaha Madill was born on 9 January 1987 in Kingston upon Thames and is Indian descent. She attended Tolworth Girls' School. As a twelve year old, she told her physics teacher that she "wanted to work in NASA’s Mission Control". She earned a bachelor's degree from King's College London in Mathematics and Physics with Astrophysics in 2008. She then moved to the International Space University, where she earned a diploma from the Space Studies Programme in 2008 and a master's degree in Space Management in 2010. In 2010 she completed a master's degree in Astronautics and Space Engineering at Cranfield University. In 2009 she taught at NASA Ames Research Centre for the International Space University Space Studies Programme.

== Career ==
Marwaha Madill's began working at European Space Agency in 2010 in the European Astronaut Centre. She was responsible for collecting and analysing data from Extra-Vehicular Activity training and operations, making recommendations for process improvement. She worked on the Gravity Loading Countermeasure Skinsuit in the Space Medicine Office, developing a metric to evaluate bone loss.

In 2011 onwards, Marwaha Madill worked as an International Space Station Payload Operations Engineer in the Microgravity User Support Centre at the German Aerospace Center (DLR), through Telespazio VEGA. In 2013 she worked between Canada and the UK, for three years as an Engineering Manager at Miovision Technologies and as the PR & Communications Lead for the Space Generation Advisory Council. In 2016 she joined TERMA B.V. for ESA as a Space Operations Engineer.

== Rocket women ==
Rocket Women, a platform for advocacy for women in STEM, was founded by Marwaha Madill in 2012.

In 2014, Marwaha Madill featured in The Telegraph's Women In Space database. She featured in Elle magazine's "12 Genius Young Women Shaping The Future". In June 2016 she was one of eight young Canadians to attend a private meeting at Parliament Hill with Prime Minister Justin Trudeau. She has given invited talks at Bluedot Festival, New Scientist Live, Norwich Science Festival and the Science Museum. She featured in the Tech Girls Canada "Portraits of Strength" exhibition. The magazine Fast Company listed Marwaha Madill as one of the "most creative people" in 2016.

In 2017 she appeared on BBC Radio 4's "Women with the Right Stuff", discussing Mercury 13. She works closely with the Royal Academy of Engineering, supporting school teachers to learn about space research and careers. She discussed "Selfies, Space and Surgery: How digital imaging sensors have shaped our world" at the Science Museum, London.

Marwaha Madill is a regular blogger about all things related to space and representation in science. Her American Scientist blog "A Space Suit that Squeezes", was the site's most popular in 2015.
