= Pan European Networks =

European marketing company

Pan European Networks (PEN) is a marketing company. They try to convince people that "publishing" with them is a way to reach European science leadership. This however appears to be untrue and it is regarded as a non-credible source. They started in 2012 and have offices in the United Kingdom and Brussels.

== Operations ==
The organization is known for making calls to researchers offering to publish their work but requesting an immediate commitment. Initial proposed charges are around 10,000 USD for a publication but this appears to be negotiable. Their persistence has been described as harassment by Uppsala University. They have also threatened to sue those who criticize them. They published a magazine called Scitech Europa Quarterly and Health Europa Quarterly among others.

== History ==
The company is owned by Darren Wilson.

== See also ==
- Predatory journal
- Vanity press
