= Science Communication (journal) =

Peer-reviewed academic journal

- Discipline: Science communication
- Language: English
- Edited by: Lee Ann Kahlor

Publication details
- Former name: Knowledge
- History: 1979–present
- Publisher: SAGE Publications
- Frequency: Bimonthly
- Impact factor: 4.6 (2023)

Standard abbreviations
- ISO 4: Sci. Commun.

Indexing
- CODEN: SCICEQ
- ISSN: 1075-5470 (print); 1552-8545 (web)
- LCCN: 95657083
- OCLC no.: 423784780

Links
- Journal homepage; Online access; Online archive

Science Communication is a peer-reviewed academic journal that covers the field of communication of science and technology. The editor-in-chief is Lee Ann Kahlor (University of Texas at Austin). It was established in 1979 as Knowledge: Creation, Diffusion, Utilization, obtaining its current name in 1994, and is published by SAGE Publications.

== Abstracting and indexing ==
The journal is abstracted and indexed in Scopus, CAB Abstracts databases, ERIC, EBSCO databases, ProQuest databases, and the Social Sciences Citation Index. According to the Journal Citation Reports, the journal has a 2023 impact factor of 4.6.
