= Legacy (Arrow) =

- Arrow episode
- Episode no.: Season 5 Episode 1
- Directed by: James Bamford
- Story by: Greg Berlanti
- Teleplay by: Marc Guggenheim & Wendy Mericle
- Cinematography by: Corey Robson
- Editing by: Thomas Wallerstein
- Production code: T27.13201
- Original air date: October 5, 2016
- Running time: 42 mins

Guest appearances
- Katie Cassidy as Laurel Lance (special guest star); Alexander Calvert as Lonnie Machin / Anarky; Rick Gonzalez as Rene Ramirez / Wild Dog; Chad L. Coleman as Tobias Church; Tyler Ritter as Billy Malone; Mike Dopud as Viktor; Adrian Holmes as Frank Pike; David Nykl as Anatoly Knyazev

Episode chronology
← Previous "Schism"	Next → "The Recruits"
- Arrow season 5

"Legacy" is the 93rd episode overall and fifth-season premiere of The CW series Arrow. The episode was written by showrunners Marc Guggenheim and Wendy Mericle from a story by co-developer Greg Berlanti and directed by James Bamford. It was first broadcast on October 5, 2016, on The CW.

This episode introduced minor villain Tobias Church and new vigilante Rene Ramirez / Wild Dog. This episode takes place months after Oliver killed Damien Darhk.

== Plot ==
Oliver Queen arrives in Russia to find Kovar. He crosses the Bratva until Anatoly saves him. Some years later, a dying Laurel Lance requests Oliver not to let her be the last Canary.

Five years after Oliver's exploits in Russia, Thea tries to cover for Oliver's lateness to a city function. Meanwhile, Oliver is battling Lonnie Machin, when a vigilante turns up and tries to assist him. Oliver then shoots the vigilante in the leg. Oliver then arrives at the party late and starts his speech. Oliver then goes to the bunker where Curtis is helping Felicity on her tech. Felicity then gives Oliver details on Wild Dog, the vigilante from earlier. Oliver refuses to listen to the idea of assembling a new team. At a location of some thugs, bent police officers kill two drug dealers and are then confronted by a new villain, Tobias Church. Tobias then kills one of the bent cops. Oliver then visits Captain Lance and finds that he has split up from Felicity's mum and is back on the bottle. Oliver offers Lance his place back on the team if he wants it. While honoring the fallen Black Canary, Laurel Lance, Oliver surrenders to masked gunmen and taken hostage in order to avoid the public finding out his true identity. Lance and Thea rush to the bunker to get Felicity to give them information on Oliver's whereabouts. Tobias introduces himself to the kidnapped politicians and Oliver. Back in the bunker, Lance tries to talk Thea into suiting back up to rescue Oliver. A bent cop is beating Oliver up and then Oliver frees himself and ultimately kills the police officer in Thea's watching when she arrives as Speedy. Oliver and Thea then go and rescue the other hostages. Due to explosives they have to abandon the hostages. Back in the bunker, Thea is in disbelief at Oliver becoming a murderer again. Thea then makes clear her retirement is permanent. Oliver returns for the hostages and successfully rescues them. Back in the bunker, Curtis demands to be one of the new recruits for the new team. Oliver webcams Diggle who approves of Oliver setting up a new team. Felicity returns to her apartment receiving a massage from her new boyfriend Detective Malone. Meanwhile, an ACU officer is on the phone with his wife when a mysterious archer ambushes him. When the officer asks if he is the Green Arrow, the archer responds in negative, before killing the officer using a chokuto.

== Production ==
=== Development ===
A police sketch that featured in the episode was drawn by comic book artist Neal Adams.

According to Marc Gruggenheim shooting for this episode started on 5 July 2016 until the fifteenth of that month while preparation for the episode was between June 23 and July 4.

According to Collider, fans were to expect "the most violent, vicious" fight scene in this episode. It was said that Amell revealed, "one particular fight scene "has the opportunity for us to have the most vicious, violent one-shot in the history of network television."

=== Casting ===
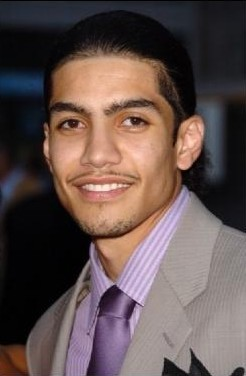
Rick Gonzalez who joins the recurring cast as new vigilante "Wild Dog"

On June 15, 2016, Rick Gonzalez was cast as Wild Dog, a new vigilante in Star City whose reckless and cocksure nature prompts Green Arrow to take him under his wing. Chad L. Coleman was cast as Tobias Church, who serves as one of this season's villains, and made his first appearance in the season premiere. On June 28, 2016, Tyler Ritter was announced to play Detective Billy Malone, that character also made his debut in this episode.

== Reception ==
=== Viewers ===
The episode was watched by 1.87 million viewers with a 0.7/3 share among adults aged 18 to 49. This was down 20% and 36% in viewership and the 18-49 rating, respectively, from the fourth-season premiere, "Green Arrow". It was also down from the previous episode, "Schism", which was watched by 2.19 million viewers with a 0.8/3 in the demographics. The episode ranked as the 77th most watched show on the week. With Live+7 DVR viewing factored in, the episode had an overall rating of 3.07 million viewers, and a 1.3 in the 18–49 demographic.

=== Critical reviews ===
Caroline Preece of Den of Geek wrote "The Arrow season 5 premiere is action-packed and feels like a return to the heights of season one in all the best ways..." she also praised villain Tobias Church by stating "The villain – Tobias Church - also ties into this nicely. He has a presence and a physicality that we haven't really seen since Slade, and that's really evident in his showdown with Oliver in the episode. He's all knuckle-dusters and confidence, rather than vague magic or rituals. He's also a black man, which does and doesn't matter at the same time."

Alasdair Wilkins of The A.V. Club gave the episode a mixed review, he said "I want to feel more optimistic than I do by the end of "Legacy", but damn it, Arrow, we've been down this road before. There are about three fundamental problems Arrow needs to reckon with coming out of its fourth season, and only one of them—the tediousness of the flashbacks—looks like something the show is actively course-correcting."

Ed Gross for Empire gave the episode 4 stars out of 5. He commented that "Legacy" "works on a number of levels. In terms of action, a hand-held and more urgent editing approach makes the fight sequences visceral, serving as an effective contrast to obviously choreographed fights of the past couple of years. Additionally, across the board the performances are strong, showing characters painfully grappling with their pasts while trying to chart new paths as they go forward. Inevitably, though, they find themselves drawn back into the world that they know best. What works particularly well is a tribute to Laurel Lance/Black Canary with the unveiling of a statue constructed in her memory. Her legacy, and what she sacrificed her life for, is extremely impactful on the characters, reminding them why they fight and what they aspire towards."

Jesse Schedeen of IGN gave the episode a 7.4 out of 10 with his verdict stating "Arrow faces a long, uphill battle this year as it tries to move forward from the incredibly disappointing Season 4 finale. With that in mind, it's disappointing that Season 5 couldn't open on a more exciting note. There was certainly plenty to enjoy this week, from the stylish fight scenes to the dramatic performances from Stephen Amell and Paul Blackthorne. But this wasn't the fast-paced, exciting kickoff the season needed, and too much remains unclear about the show's ongoing direction right now."
