= List of Arrow characters =

The main cast featured in a promotional image for the second season. From left to right, Laurel Lance (Cassidy), Slade Wilson (Bennett), Felicity Smoak (Rickards), Oliver Queen (Amell), John Diggle (Ramsey), Thea Queen (Holland), and Roy Harper (Haynes).

Arrow is an American superhero television series developed by Greg Berlanti, Marc Guggenheim, and Andrew Kreisberg based on the DC Comics character Green Arrow, a costumed crime-fighter created by Mort Weisinger and George Papp, and is set in the Arrowverse, sharing continuity with other Arrowverse television series. The series premiered in the United States on The CW on October 10, 2012, with international broadcasting taking place in late 2012 and primarily filmed in Vancouver, British Columbia, Canada. Arrow follows billionaire playboy Oliver Queen (Stephen Amell), who claimed to have spent five years shipwrecked on Lian Yu, a mysterious island in the North China Sea, before returning home to Starling City (later renamed "Star City") to fight crime and corruption as a secret vigilante whose weapon of choice is a bow and arrow.

Throughout the series, Oliver is joined by others in his quest, among them former soldier John Diggle (David Ramsey), I.T. expert and skilled hacker Felicity Smoak (Emily Bett Rickards), former assassin Sara Lance (Caity Lotz), aspiring vigilante Roy Harper (Colton Haynes), Oliver's sister Thea (Willa Holland), and attorney-turned-vigilante Laurel Lance (Katie Cassidy). The group also receives support from Laurel and Sara's father Officer Quentin Lance (Paul Blackthorne). During the first five seasons of the show, characters from Oliver's past appear in a separate story arc based on Oliver's flashbacks, which highlight parallels from Oliver's history that shape events in the main story. Starting with season seven, a series of flash-forwards focus on Oliver's children William and Mia, exploring how present events would affect their future and Green Arrow's legacy. In season eight, Oliver's future has collided with his present as William and Mia, along with Connor Hawke, have time traveled to 2019, leading Team Arrow to learn about Star City's dystopian future.

The following is a list of main characters who have appeared in the television series; for a list of supporting characters see List of supporting Arrow characters. Many of the characters appearing in the series are based on DC Comics characters.

== Overview ==
Legend
= Main cast (credited)
= Recurring cast (4+)
= Guest cast (1-3)

Character	Portrayed by	First appearance	Seasons							
Character	Portrayed by	First appearance	1	2	3	4	5	6	7	8
Oliver Queen / The Hood / Arrow / Green Arrow / Spectre	Stephen Amell	"Pilot"	Main (Note: Amell also portrays Werner Zytle in a Vertigo-induced hallucination in season three, Christopher Chance / Human Target disguised as his character in season five, and his character's Earth-X doppelgänger in season six.)	Main	Main	Main	Main	Main	Main	Main
Laurel Lance / Black Canary (Earth-1)	Katie Cassidy (Note: Credited as "Katie Cassidy Rodgers" following her marriage (season 7 only))	"Pilot"	Main	Main	Main	Main	Guest (Note: Although Cassidy was in the main cast, but the role of Laurel Lance of Earth 1 was a guest.) (Note: Although Cassidy is billed as a "special appearance" in season 8, she is still considered a series regular.)	Guest	Guest	Guest
Laurel Lance / Black Siren / Black Canary (Earth-2)	Katie Cassidy	"What We Leave Behind"					Recurring	Main	Main	Main
Tommy Merlyn	Colin Donnell	"Pilot"	Main	Guest	Guest			Guest (Note: Donnell also portrays his character's Earth-X doppelgänger and Christopher Chance / Human Target disguised as his character in season six, and his character's Earth-2 doppelgänger in season eight.)	Guest	Guest
John Diggle / Spartan / Green Arrow	David Ramsey	"Pilot"	Main	Main	Main	Main	Main	Main	Main	Main
Thea Queen / Speedy	Willa Holland	"Pilot"	Main (Note: Holland is credited through "The Thanatos Guild".)	Main	Main	Main	Main	Main	Guest	Guest
Moira Queen	Susanna Thompson	"Pilot"	Main	Main	Voice only (Note: Thompson is uncredited for her character's voice role.)		Guest			Guest (Note: Thompson also portrays her character's Earth-2 doppelgänger in season eight.)
Quentin Lance	Paul Blackthorne	"Pilot"	Main	Main	Main	Main	Main	Main	Guest	Guest
Felicity Smoak / Overwatch	Emily Bett Rickards	"Lone Gunmen"	Recurring (Note: Rickards is credited as Emily Rickards and receives co-star billing for her character's first two appearances, in addition to being uncredited for her character's appearance in "Year's End".)	Main	Main	Main	Main	Main	Main	Guest
Roy Harper / Arsenal	Colton Haynes	"Dodger"	Recurring	Main	Main	Guest		Guest	Main	Guest
Slade Wilson / Deathstroke	Manu Bennett	"Betrayal"	Recurring	Main	Guest		Guest	Guest		Guest (Note: Bennett is uncredited for his character's cameo.)
Malcolm Merlyn / Dark Archer	John Barrowman	"An Innocent Man"	Recurring	Recurring	Main	Main	Recurring	Guest (Note: A scene featuring John Barrowman in season six was composed of archival footage cut from previous episodes. The actor himself was not present on set. However, since this footage had never been shown before, his appearance in the project is officially considered a cameo, albeit an archival one.) (Note: Barrowman also portrays his character's Earth-2 doppelgänger in season eight.)	Guest	Guest
Curtis Holt / Mister Terrific	Echo Kellum	"The Candidate"				Recurring	Main (Note: Kellum is credited in the main cast through "Star City Slayer" and as a special guest star in "You Have Saved This City".)	Main	Main	Guest
Adrian Chase / Prometheus / Simon Morrison	Josh Segarra	"A Matter of Trust" (Note: Prometheus (Earth-1) first appears in "Legacy"; however, Segarra is not credited as his character until "A Matter of Trust".)					Main	Guest		Guest (Note: Segarra portrays his character's Earth-2 doppelgänger in season eight.)
Rene Ramirez / Wild Dog	Rick Gonzalez	"Legacy"					Recurring	Main (Note: Gonzalez also portrays his character's Earth-2 doppelgänger in season eight.)	Main	Main
Dinah Drake / Black Canary / Tina Boland	Juliana Harkavy	"Who Are You?"					Recurring	Main (Note: Harkavy also portrays her character's Earth-2 doppelgänger in season eight.)	Main	Main
Ricardo Diaz / Dragon	Kirk Acevedo	"Promises Kept"						Recurring	Main (Note: Acevedo is credited through "Brothers & Sisters".)	
Emiko Queen / Green Arrow	Sea Shimooka	"Unmasked" (Note: New Green Arrow first appears in "Inmate 4587"; however, Shimooka is not credited as her character until "Unmasked".)							Main	Guest
Mia Smoak-Queen / Blackstar / Green Arrow	Katherine McNamara	"Unmasked"							Recurring	Main
William Clayton	Jack Moore	"Legends of Yesterday"				Guest	Guest	Recurring	Recurring	Guest
William Clayton	Ben Lewis	"Inmate 4587"							Recurring	Main
Connor Hawke	Joseph David-Jones	"Emerald Archer"							Recurring	Main
Mar Novu / The Monitor	LaMonica Garrett	"Elseworlds, Part 2"							Guest	Main

== Main characters ==
=== Oliver Queen / Green Arrow ===
Oliver Jonas Queen (portrayed by Stephen Amell; seasons 1–8) is the main protagonist in the series. He is a billionaire playboy who returns to his home of Starling City after being apparently stranded on a desert island for five years and presumed dead. On his return, he embarks on a secret double life as a masked vigilante known as 'The Hood' and the Green Arrow. He also appears in Arrowverse spin-off shows The Flash, Legends of Tomorrow and Supergirl, as well as animated web series Vixen. He also plays a central role in the annual Arrowverse crossover events.

In The Flash season two episode "Welcome to Earth-2", it is revealed that his Earth-2 doppelganger died on the Queen's Gambit.

The character is based on the DC Comics character Green Arrow.

=== Laurel Lance / Black Canary (Earth-1) ===
Dinah Laurel Lance (portrayed by Katie Cassidy; (Note: Starting with the season 7 episode "My Name Is Emiko Queen", Cassidy is credited as "Katie Cassidy Rodgers".) main: seasons 1–4; guest: seasons 5–8) is an assistant district attorney and Oliver Queen's ex-girlfriend. She later becomes a vigilante known as Black Canary. The character also appears in Arrowverse spin-off shows The Flash and Legends of Tomorrow as well as animated web-series Vixen.

The character is based on the DC Comics character Black Canary.

=== Tommy Merlyn ===
Thomas "Tommy" Merlyn (portrayed by Colin Donnell; main: season 1; guest: seasons 2–3 & 6–8) is Oliver Queen's best friend and Malcolm Merlyn's son, as well as revealed to be Thea Queen's half-brother. Tommy is an original character for the show, not based on anyone in the comics. He was adapted for comics in 2012.

==== Other versions ====
Donnell also portrays two other versions respectively from Earth-X and Earth-2.

- The Earth-X doppelgänger (Note: Within the context of the Arrowverse a doppelgänger is an individual's multiversal counterpart.) appears in the crossover Crisis on Earth-X as the serial killer Prometheus. However, Tommy dies from a suicide pill after taunting Oliver.
- The Earth-2 doppelgänger appears in the final season's premiere as the vigilante Dark Archer. When Oliver is sent by the Monitor to Earth-2, Oliver is conflicted with the Dark Archer whose plan is to use Dwarf Star particles to level the Glades in his own Undertaking, although Tommy is stopped by Oliver's convincing.

=== John Diggle / Spartan ===
John Thomas Diggle (portrayed by David Ramsey; seasons 1–8) is a decorated former United States Army Special Forces soldier, honorably discharged with the rank of master sergeant, an ordained minister, and Oliver's best friend and partner. The character, again portrayed by Ramsey, also appears in Arrowverse spin-off shows The Flash, Legends of Tomorrow and Supergirl, playing a significant role in Arrowverse crossover events. John is also the stepson of General Roy Stewart.

While John Diggle was originally a character created for the show, his popularity led to a character of the same name modeled after Ramsey's appearance to be created for the Green Arrow comics in The New 52. While elements from the Arrow TV series were removed after issue 40, John appeared again following the relaunching of the series as part of DC Rebirth.

=== Thea Queen / Speedy ===
Thea Dearden Queen (portrayed by Willa Holland; main: seasons 1–6; guest: seasons 7–8) is the daughter of Moira Queen and Malcolm Merlyn, though both Malcolm and Thea were unaware of their relation to each other until season two, and the younger half-sister to Oliver Queen and Tommy Merlyn. She goes on to become a vigilante known as Speedy.

Her brother's nickname for her and later hero persona ("Speedy"), her middle name of Dearden and the alias "Mia" she used during her time at Corto Maltese, are Easter egg connections to Mia Dearden, one of Green Arrow's sidekicks in the comics.

The Earth-2 Thea Queen overdosed on Vertigo, causing Tommy to become Dark Archer and plan revenge on the Glades by destroying it.

=== Moira Queen ===
Moira Dearden Queen (portrayed by Susanna Thompson; main: seasons 1–2; uncredited voice cameo: season 3; guest: seasons 5 & 8) is the mother of Oliver and Thea, the former acting CEO of Queen Consolidated, mayoral candidate and wife of Robert Queen and later Walter Steele. She also had a brief affair with Malcolm Merlyn after his wife's death, which resulted in Thea's birth. Moira is revealed to be part of Merlyn's Undertaking and is imprisoned until bail. She is later killed by Oliver's nemesis Slade Wilson after pitting Oliver in choosing whether Thea or Moira dies. Following the Crisis event, the formation of Earth-Prime brings back Moira who attends Oliver's funeral after the latter's death during Crisis and becomes the guardian of Oliver's son, William.

==== Other versions ====
Thompson also portrays the Earth-2 doppelgänger of Moira, who is married to the Earth-2 version of Malcolm Merlyn. She is erased from existence after a wave of the anti-matter destroys Earth-2.

Thompson also voices Wellenreiter's A.I. system in the crossover Crisis on Earth-X. She is Gideon's Earth-X equivalent aboard a timeship owned by Dark Arrow and was designed by Eobard Thawne.

=== Quentin Lance ===
Quentin Larry Lance (portrayed by Paul Blackthorne; main: seasons 1–6; guest: seasons 7–8) is a mayor, former police detective, captain, and deputy mayor, the father of Laurel Lance and Sara Lance, and former husband of Dinah Lance. Quentin has a grudge against the Queen family, blaming Oliver for Sara's apparent death. However, Quentin reconciles with Oliver after knowing Sara is alive and a vigilante, eventually joining Oliver's crusade. Quentin dies in the sixth season after being attacked by Ricardo Diaz. After the Crisis, the timeline is altered and Quentin survives.

==== Other versions ====
Blackthorne also portrays the Earth-X doppelgänger of the character during the Crisis on Earth-X crossover in which he is Sturmbannführer of the Nazi's paramilitary rank. On this Earth, Quentin had killed Sara after learning she was bisexual. He is also the father of the Earth-X version of Laurel, known as Siren-X.

An Earth-2 version of the character is mentioned several times by Black Siren, although this version is said to be deceased.

Quentin Lance is based on the DC Comics character Larry Lance.

=== Felicity Smoak / Overwatch ===
Felicity Megan Smoak (portrayed by Emily Bett Rickards; main: seasons 2–7; recurring: season 1; guest: season 8) is an I.T. expert, partner and later wife of Oliver Queen. Felicity is a MIT graduate with a master's degree in cyber security and computer sciences. The character originally appeared as a one-episode guest star in season one, later becoming recurring and was promoted to series regular from season two onwards. The character, also portrayed by Rickards, appears in Arrowverse spin-off shows The Flash, Legends of Tomorrow and Supergirl, as well as animated web-series Vixen. She plays a significant role in the annual Arrowverse crossover events.

In a flash forward to 2040, Felicity is rescued from Galaxy One by her children and joins their resistance movement against the company that hijacked her Archer security program. After Galaxy One is defeated, Felicity leaves Star City in her children's hands and leaves with the Monitor to a place from which there is no return. The final episode "Fadeout" revealed that this location is the afterlife as she reunites with Oliver Queen.

An alternate version of Felicity, again portrayed by Rickards, from Earth-X appears in the "Crisis on Earth-X" crossover event, where she is shown to be interned in a concentration camp.

The character is based on the DC Comics character Felicity Smoak, who in the comics is Ronnie Raymond's stepmother and the head of a software company. A version of Felicity based on Rickards' portrayal was introduced in the DC Comics universe in Green Arrow (vol. 5) #35.

=== Roy Harper / Arsenal ===
Roy William Harper Jr. (portrayed by Colton Haynes; main: seasons 2–3 & 7; recurring: seasons 1 & 8; guest: seasons 4 & 6) is a former street criminal, Thea Queen's boyfriend and a supporter of the Arrow.

In season one, Roy is a small-time criminal who falls in love with Thea after robbing her, and is arrested multiple times by Quentin Lance. He does not see any other way to live until the Arrow saves him from a kidnapping, after which Roy attempts to find the Arrow to help him. Roy later works as a waiter at Verdant.

In season two, Roy often goes out to clean up the streets, until the Arrow convinces him to gather intelligence instead. After being injected with Mirakuru, Roy gains super strength but slowly loses his sanity. The Arrow reveals his identity when Oliver convinces Roy to stop Bronze Tiger. Roy trains with Oliver to control his strength, but is forced to break up with Thea. Slade kidnaps Roy to use his blood to create his army, leaving Roy completely insane and causing him to go on a rampage, killing a cop. Roy takes part in the season finale's battle, with his own mask, but he is slightly amnesiac, not remembering anything after breaking up with Thea.

In season three, Roy is Oliver's partner and participates with him in the field. He takes on the alter-ego "Arsenal", though the media also refers to him as "Red Arrow". Thea makes Roy her assistant manager at Verdant, and they eventually get back together. Sara's murder brings the repressed memories of his rampage to the surface and Roy supports the family of the police officer he killed. When Oliver is presumed dead, Roy takes his place as the team's head archer, often teaming with Laurel on missions. After Quentin Lance resumes his manhunt against Arrow, Roy subsequently impersonates Oliver's alter-ego and fakes his own death, leaving Starling City to assume that Arrow is dead so that Oliver can be free. Roy passes on his Arsenal suit to Thea after leaving town.

In season four, after building a new life in Hub City, Roy returns to his vigilante role after Calculator extorts him to steal technological components and Thea is out of commission. In season five, Roy appears as a hologram when Oliver is about to leave the Dominators' simulated dream world.

In season six, Roy is brought back to Star City by Ricardo Diaz in an attempt to make him testify that Oliver is Green Arrow in court. As he refuses to betray his friend and former mentor, he is tortured by the cops and by Diaz himself. Roy is rescued by Oliver and Thea and helps Thea and Team Arrow to fight against Thanatos Guild. Later, Roy leaves the city with Thea and Nyssa al Ghul to find and destroy Lazarus Pits around the world. After Christopher Chance disguises himself as Tommy Merlyn and claims to be Green Arrow, Roy is cleared of all charges. When Oliver reveals his identity to Star City, Roy's name is cleared.

Haynes returns as a regular for season seven. He returns to Star City to help Team Arrow battle the Ninth Circle. Due to the Ninth Circle being led by Oliver's half-sister Emiko, he feels he could not ask for Thea's help and instead contacts Roy. Roy reveals that he died battling the Thanatos Guild and was revived by Thea and Nyssa with a Lazarus Pit, which results in bloodlust. After killing two innocent security guards, Roy leaves Star City to atone for his actions.

In season eight, Roy is recruited by Diggle in preparation to make a stand against the upcoming "Crisis." During a subsequent fight on Lian Yu, Roy loses an arm. In "Fadeout," Roy gets a cybernetic arm and assists in finding a younger William. Roy later proposes to Thea and she accepts.

The character is based on the DC Comics character Roy Harper.

=== Slade Wilson / Deathstroke ===
Slade Wilson (portrayed by Manu Bennett; main: season 2; recurring: season 1; guest: seasons 3 & 5–6) is a former Australian Secret Intelligence Service (ASIS) operative, Oliver Queen's mentor on Lian Yu, and a mercenary who serves as the main antagonist of season two.

Slade is hired by the Australian Secret Intelligence Service to extract former military soldier Yao Fei. As a cover, he takes his son Joe to New Zealand on a camping trip where he kills a Chinese agent in an attempt to locate Fei, who is on the island Lian Yu. Slade and his partner Billy Wintergreen are sent to extract Fei from the island, however, their plane is shot down while en route to the island and the two men were captured by Edward Fyers. Fyers gives the two an offer to join his cause, although Slade refuses while Wintergreen accepts the offer. For almost a year, Slade is held hostage by Fyers until he is rescued by Fei but they then become separated. Six months later, Slade catches a shipwrecked Oliver searching through his hideout. Slade trains Oliver to take out Fyers while Slade kills Billy for his betrayal. Oliver and Slade also rescue Fei's daughter Shado before Fei is killed by Fyers. Oliver then kills Fyers. Sometime after, Slade is wounded by Dr. Anthony Ivo but is saved with Ivo's enhanced drug Mirakuru by Oliver. Ivo kills Shado angering Slade. Ivo frames Oliver for the murder, pitting Oliver and Slade at odds as Oliver stabs Slade in the eye. Slade survives Oliver's attack and is found near the coast of the Philippines and is taken back to an ASIS facility where he reunites with son Joe. He later begins hallucinating Shado, who orders Slade to keep his promise to kill Oliver which Slade finds out is alive and has returned to Starling City. Slade leaves to Starling where he begins his revenge plan against Oliver and become the killer "Deathstroke", dubbed by A.R.G.U.S. As Deathstroke, Slade plans to take over Starling by overrunning the city with Mirakuru enhanced soldiers. In the process, Slade threatens Oliver's family by kidnapping Thea and killing Moira. Eventually, Oliver defeats Slade and his army using a Mirakuru cure and is imprisoned on Lian Yu where overtime, he wears off from Mirakuru. Oliver later recruits Slade by giving him the location of his son Joe, to face against the vigilante serial killer Prometheus to save his captured friends and family. After Prometheus destroys the island by killing himself, it is revealed Oliver's friends survived as well as Slade, who survived by plane. Five months after, Slade visits Oliver to thank him on the intel of Joe's whereabouts in Calgary. After rescuing Joe from the terrorist group the Jackals with Oliver's help, Joe reveals he is their leader leading into a confrontation. During the fight, Joe reveals he has a brother, Grant, before escaping the fight. Slade then parts ways with Oliver.

=== Malcolm Merlyn / Dark Archer ===
Malcolm Merlyn (portrayed by John Barrowman; main: seasons 3–4; recurring: seasons 1–2 & 5; guest: seasons 7–8) is a wealthy businessman, the father of Tommy Merlyn and Thea Queen, and Oliver's nemesis who serves as the main antagonist of the series. In season one, Malcolm plots an "Undertaking" to avenge the murder of his wife Rebecca by destroying the crime-infested "Glades" with an earthquake device. When Robert Queen threatened the Undertaking, Malcolm arranged to destroy Robert's ship, Queen's Gambit, resulting in Robert's death and indirectly leading to Oliver and Sara becoming the Arrow and the Canary. In the main story of season one, he uses Moira to gain access to the resources needed for the Undertaking. He tries to reshape Tommy into a better person by cutting him off which works but causes tensions between them. When the Arrow interferes with his plan, Malcolm becomes a vigilante called "Dark Archer" to oppose him. He suspects Oliver to be Arrow and is proven right after defeating him a second time. In the season finale, Malcolm is seemingly killed by Oliver, though he manages to destroy much of the Glades, inadvertently kills Tommy, and is publicly exposed for his crimes by Moira.

In season two, Malcolm returns to suborn the jury in Moira's trial to find her innocent of the Undertaking. He discovers that he is Thea's biological father following Adam Donner's discovery of Malcolm's affair with Moira. In an attempt to keep Malcolm from Thea, Moira informs Ra's al Ghul of his survival, forcing Malcolm to flee Starling City. During Slade's attack on the city, Malcolm returns to save Thea from the Mirakuru soldiers and convinces her to leave Starling with him.

In season three, Malcolm is revealed to have trained Thea to be a warrior in Corto Maltese. Despite being both the League's target and a fugitive, Malcolm secretly returns to Starling City, using personal wealth and resources following the loss of his company. Under an alias, Malcolm purchases the foundry from Queen Consolidated, the site of Thea's nightclub Verdant. It is revealed that his name in the League of Assassins is "Al Sa-Her" (الساحر), meaning "The Magician". He continues to train Thea until she can defeat him in combat. Malcolm plots the death of Ra's to eliminate his blood debt, and manipulates Thea into killing Sara so that Oliver will take the fall for her murder and challenge Ra's to a duel; this plan fails and almost gets Oliver killed. Malcolm learns that crime lord Danny Brickwell was responsible for the murder of his wife, but Oliver persuades him to choose justice over vengeance for Thea's sake, allowing Brickwell to be tried for his crimes. Malcolm trains Oliver in swordplay in preparation of battling Ra's together. When Oliver tells Thea that Malcolm brainwashed her into killing Sara, she betrays Malcolm to the League; he is captured and tortured but freed from Nanda Parbat when Oliver takes the place of Ra's. After Thea is killed by Ra's, Malcolm accompanies Oliver to Nanda Parbat to revive her but Oliver is forced to join the League. Malcolm secretly works with Oliver to cripple the League from within and stop the plan of Ra's to unleash the Alpha/Omega bio-weapon on Starling City. Malcolm leads Team Arrow to save the city until Oliver's return. After Ra's is killed by Oliver in a final sword fight, he passes leadership of the League to Malcolm.

In season four, Malcolm helps Laurel resurrect Sara to settle his family's blood debt with Laurel, and helps Thea control her bloodlust. He provides information to Oliver and Barry Allen about Vandal Savage. To keep Darhk from learning Oliver's secret, Malcolm masquerades as Green Arrow. However, despite occasionally helping Oliver, Malcolm remains an amoral man and is despised by Oliver's team and their allies. Malcolm's aid to Oliver is either for protecting Thea or for his own agendas. Malcolm loses his left hand and his power after Nyssa wins the League's leadership with Oliver's help, leading Malcolm to ally with Darhk for revenge against Oliver. Darhk makes Malcolm a H.I.V.E. member and provides him with a prosthesis. Malcolm steals Damien's idol to protect himself and Thea from Damien's plans and works with Andy Diggle, which results in Laurel's death. Malcolm remains a leader to disbanded remnants of the League, and with them he forms its splinter faction the Thanatos Guild. Malcolm allies with Team Arrow again when Darhk tries to destroy the world without the means to survive it.

In season five, an illusion of Malcolm appears in the Dominators' dream world and opposes Oliver, Thea, John, Ray and Sara when they try to leave, but is swiftly killed by Thea. Malcolm appears in flashbacks working with Konstantin Kovar, giving him Sarin gas in exchange for the means to acquire information on Unidac Industries to build the earthquake device. Malcolm returns in the penultimate episode of season five, offering Oliver his assistance in saving his friends, most importantly Thea. After Malcolm frees Thea, Felicity, Curtis and Samantha, Thea accidentally steps on a landmine, which kills Malcolm and Captain Boomerang.

In season eight, the Earth-2 Malcolm Merlyn is revealed to be married to Moira Queen and is not the Dark Archer.

The character is based on the DC Comics character Merlyn.

=== Curtis Holt / Mister Terrific ===
Curtis Holt (portrayed by Echo Kellum; main: seasons 5–7; recurring: season 4; guest: season 8) is a technological savant, inventor, and bronze medal-winning Olympic decathlete, who works with Felicity at Palmer Technologies. In season four, he helps her rescue Ray Palmer from Damien Darhk. He later learns Oliver's secret identity and helps them defeat Brie Larvan. He then helps Felicity and Noah shut down Rubicon to stop H.I.V.E.

He officially joins the team in season five as part of Oliver's efforts to expand and accept help after Diggle and Thea retired. While in the field, Curtis adopts a costume similar to his comic counterpart, including his 'Fair Play' jacket and T-shaped mask. He alternates between field work and tech support depending on the crisis, such as helping Felicity devise a means of translating the extraterrestrial technology during the Dominators' invasion. In the mid-season finale "What We Leave Behind", Curtis is hospitalized after he is shot with a tuberculosis vaccine by Prometheus, aided by the treachery of apparent teammate Evelyn Sharp. Curtis's husband Paul leaves him after discovering his vigilante activities, and they eventually divorce. At the end of season five, Curtis' fate is unknown due to the destruction of Lian Yu caused by Adrian Chase.

In season six, Curtis has survived the explosion by taking shelter in the plane with the others and is working with the team using his upgraded T spheres and other tech. It is revealed, that after leaving Palmer Technologies last year, he started an online business, which prompts Felicity to propose partnership with him to form their own company. After Oliver's actions causes Curtis to leave Team Arrow, he forms a new team with Dinah and Rene, with the same goals as the original Team Arrow.

In season seven, Curtis works as part of A.R.G.U.S., but ultimately leaves the group following a disagreement over the decision to revive the Suicide Squad as the Ghost Initiative. He accepts a job in Washington, D.C., and leaves Star City. He later returns to take part in the operation to track down Emiko Queen's biological weapon, before returning to D.C. to propose to his boyfriend.

Curtis Holt is an original character based on the DC Comics character Mister Terrific, sharing the last name of the second incarnation, Michael Holt.

=== Adrian Chase / Prometheus / Simon Morrison ===
Simon Morrison (portrayed by Josh Segarra; main: season 5; guest: seasons 6 & 8) has a grudge against Oliver Queen, and is the main antagonist of season five. He is the ruthless hooded archer/serial killer Prometheus, while now known as "Adrian Chase", Star City's new district attorney who helps Oliver as the Mayor clean up the streets through the justice system. He is the illegitimate son of Justin Claybourne, a pharmaceutical owner on the List who was killed during Oliver's first year as The Hood. Unknown to him, his father realized Morrison is psychopathic and wanted nothing to do with him. Seeking revenge against Oliver, he was taught by Talia al Ghul to gain a skillset to match Oliver's. Wearing a black uniform almost identical to Oliver's first garb, Prometheus deduced that the Green Arrow was the presumably-deceased Hood/Arrow, and begins a killing spree of innocent people with arrows and shurikens made from Oliver's discarded bolts. Prometheus has no tolerance for anyone else targeting Green Arrow and kills Tobias Church when the crime lord ignores a warning to leave Green Arrow alone. He also targets those close to Oliver by framing Quentin Lance, manipulating Evelyn Sharp into betraying Oliver, staging Billy Malone in his uniform to be killed by Oliver, and sends Black Siren to mess with Oliver. After Morrison and his allies kidnap Oliver's friends and family to Lian Yu, Oliver's party ultimately beats Morrison's. Unwilling to accept defeat, Morrison kills himself, detonating the bombs throughout the island in an attempt to kill Oliver's loved ones, successfully killing Samantha Clayton. In season six, Morrison returns as one of Oliver's hallucinations while drugged by Vertigo.

On why Adrian is not Vigilante as in the comics, Guggenheim stated,

We knew we were going to do Vigilante this year, we knew who the character of Prometheus was, we knew that the character of Prometheus was the son of one of Oliver's early kills in season one, we knew that he was going to be someone who was going to indoctrinate himself into Oliver's good graces in the mayor's office and eventually betray him. One morning... it occurred to me that if we called this character Adrian Chase, and we made him a district attorney, everyone would be so focused on when he becomes Vigilante that they wouldn't be expecting that he really was Prometheus.

In season eight, the Earth-2 Adrian Chase is revealed to be operating as the Hood, working alongside Laurel Lance / Black Canary. Adrian and Laurel assist Earth-1's Oliver in preventing Tommy Merlyn as Dark Archer from taking revenge on the Glades for Thea's death.

The character is based on the DC Comics characters Prometheus and Adrian Chase.

=== Laurel Lance / Black Siren / Black Canary (Earth-2) ===
Following the death of the Earth-1 Laurel Lance in season four, an antagonistic version of the character from Earth-2 named Black Siren (also portrayed by Cassidy, main: seasons 6–8; (Note: Although Cassidy is billed as a "special appearance" in season 8, she is still considered a series regular for the season.) recurring: season 5) is introduced. She eventually redeems herself and returns to Earth-2 as the heroic Black Canary. Like her doppelgänger, she was also romantically involved with the Oliver Queen of her Earth before his death. Originally appearing on The Flash, the character was promoted to series regular on Arrow for seasons six, seven, and eight.

The character is based on the DC Comics character Black Canary.

=== Rene Ramirez / Wild Dog ===
Rene Ramirez (portrayed by Rick Gonzalez; main: seasons 6–8; recurring: season 5) is a vigilante in Star City whose reckless and cocksure actions prompt the Green Arrow to guide him. His vigilante attire consists of normal clothes, with a hockey mask to hide his identity; the red dog image on the shirt of his uniform, leads to his gaining the moniker of "Wild Dog". Already trained as a soldier, Rene receives additional training from Oliver and becomes a skilled combatant. Prior to becoming a vigilante, Rene kills a criminal in defense of his family, which led to his wife's death during the altercation; his daughter Zoe was put in a foster care due to the community deeming him unfit as he succumbs to alcohol blackouts. With Curtis Holt's help, Rene seeks legal actions to get his daughter back. He later becomes Quentin Lance's assistant to help him reform Star City politically and they become friends.

Rene later becomes one of the main characters in season six, having survived the explosions on Lian Yu. He then becomes one of the main members of Team Arrow, and receives improved vigilante attire. However, after helping Team Arrow, Team Flash, Supergirl and the Legends save the multiverse from the invaders of Earth-X, Rene is cornered by FBI agent Samanda Watson, who knows about his secret identity as Wild Dog and forces Rene to testify against Oliver as the Green Arrow. If Rene refuses, he will never see his daughter again. When Rene confesses this to Oliver, Oliver kicks him off the team. But the entire team is soon brought back together to rescue Quentin from Cayden James and Black Siren. After the team rescues Quentin, Rene is kicked off the team permanently for abandoning his primary mission. Because of this, Dinah and Curtis leave the team too, no longer trusting Oliver. Oliver later apologizes to the three, but while they accept his apology, they refuse to return to Team Arrow and form a team of their own called New Team Arrow. Later, when it is revealed that Ricardo Diaz is the true villain of season six after he kills James, Rene is coerced by Diaz into testifying against Oliver at his trial, with Diaz threatening the safety of Rene's daughter in front of him. However, Rene, despite Diaz's threat, supports Oliver along with the rest of Team Arrow. After the trial, Oliver is free to go, thanks to Christopher Chance posing as the judge, and finally makes peace with Rene. Later, during the final battle with Diaz and his organization, The Quadrant, Quentin gets shot and eventually dies of his wounds in hospital later that day. Rene becomes one of the many members of Team Arrow, who mourns Quentin's death. When Oliver is arrested by Watson and the FBI, and publicly announces his identity as the Green Arrow to the world, Rene continues to protect Star City in his honor.

In a flashforward to 2040, Rene has become the mayor of the Glades. After a timeline change following the Crisis, Rene is the mayor of Star City.

In season eight, the Earth-2 Rene is Malcolm Merlyn's head of security, but secretly works with Tommy Merlyn / Dark Archer in his plan to destroy the Glades for the death of Thea. He is defeated by Green Arrow and arrested by the police and is later killed when Earth-2 is destroyed.

The character is based on the DC Comics character Wild Dog.

=== Dinah Drake / Black Canary ===
Dinah Drake (portrayed by Juliana Harkavy; main: seasons 6–8; recurring: season 5) is a detective, formerly of the Central City Police Department. She went undercover in a drug ring with the alias "Tina Boland", only for her partner to be murdered after they were both revealed to be cops. After the particle accelerator explosion, she receives the ability to produce sonic waves with her scream and hunts down the leader of the drug ring to get revenge for her partner's death. Oliver and his team seek to recruit Drake as a candidate to succeed Laurel Lance as Black Canary. Dinah joined the Star City Police Department after she settled in the city.

Following the battle on Lian Yu, Dinah is upgraded from a detective to police lieutenant. In flashbacks, Dinah was almost killed by Black Siren before being saved by Quentin. She later finds out that her former partner-lover Vincent Sobel is alive and is the Vigilante. She resumes her relationship with him before he is killed by Black Siren. She goes on a killing spree, targeting Black Siren and her allies. She is later fired from her job after Oliver fires corrupt police captain Kimberly Hill. Before leaving the desk, she fires Dinah and the rest of the honest cops. Dinah and Black Siren become allies when Quentin is shot by Ricardo Diaz.

In season seven, Dinah is once again part of the SCPD. She is outed as the Black Canary, when she uses her canary cry to save Mayor Pollard's life. When Dinah has her throat slit by Stanley Dover, she loses her ability to perform the canary cry naturally. She regains the ability after being given Sara Lance's tech collar, which replicates her original abilities.

In a flashforward to 2040, Dinah is part of a vigilante resistance group called the Canary Network. After the defeat of Galaxy One, Dinah departs Star City, leaving Zoe Ramirez in charge of the Canary Network.

In season eight, Dinah learns details about her future self after adult versions William Clayton, Mia Smoak, and Connor Hawke arrived from the year 2040. Intrigues with her counterpart's actions with the Canary Network with Laurel's future self, she and Laurel are planning to start it decades earlier than expected. Following the Crisis and the formation of Earth-Prime, Dinah is no longer sporting her throat injury. Following Oliver's funeral, she turns down a promotion and relocates to Metropolis. Laurel later found her in 2040 operating a nightclub where she mentioned that she woke up in 2040 the day after Oliver's funeral and that she seems to have been completely erased from existence and that there is no documentation of her.

In Earth-2, Dinah's doppelgänger is an SCPD sergeant, but secretly works with Tommy Merlyn / Dark Archer in his plan to destroy the Glades for the death of Thea. She is defeated by Green Arrow and arrested by the police and is later killed when Earth-2 is destroyed.

The character is based on the DC Comics character Black Canary.

=== Ricardo Diaz / Dragon ===
Ricardo Diaz (portrayed by Kirk Acevedo; main: season 7; recurring: season 6), when he first appears, is a drug lord, who leads a team street criminals and scientists in the development of an experimental steroid used by John Diggle to work around his tremors.

He is later revealed to be the main antagonist of season six, who manipulates events of Oliver Queen and Cayden James' lives behind the scenes, and kills James upon admitting that he orchestrated his son's death and prepares to launch his own scheme upon Star City while getting its judges, politicians and police officers on his payroll. With help from Samanda Watson and the FBI, the politicians and police officers that are on Diaz's payroll are arrested. Diaz mortally wounds Quentin Lance, but manages to evade capture when he is knocked off a building by Black Siren and lands in water. Now in hiding from both the federal authorities and Oliver Queen's allies for his machinations, Diaz is vengeful towards Oliver for crippling his criminal network.

In season seven, Diaz contacts some unnamed inmates inside Slabside Maximum Security Prison to make Oliver's time there miserable, while also targeting his wife Felicity outside of prison. Having hired new allies, the Longbow Hunters, Diaz gets his hands on a drug, which gives him enhanced-strength. He then targets Anatoly Knyazev for betraying him when he worked with Cayden James, but is captured by John Diggle, who is helped by an unidentified new Green Arrow (Emiko Queen). When Diaz is brought to Slabside Maximum Security Prison, he bribes himself free, takes control of the prison and releases all inmates from their cells in an attempt to get Oliver. With help from Bronze Tiger, Oliver subdues most of the inmates and finally beats Diaz in his cell.

Later, when A.R.G.U.S. discovers that a financier named Dante is behind multiple terrorist cells, including the Longbow Hunters, Diggle places Diaz in the Ghost Initiative and has an explosive placed in his neck to ensure his compliance in tracking him down. They successfully track down Dante, but during the mission to apprehend him, Diaz uses a defibrillator to short out his implant and exposes the set up to Dante. This leads to Dante killing the deputy director of A.R.G.U.S. and Princess Noor while escaping. Felicity confronts Diaz and holds him at gunpoint until Diggle knocks him out. Diaz is sent back to Slabside for going against his deal. While in his solitary cell, an unknown person floods his cell with gasoline from the sprinklers and then lights him on fire. Ben Turner reveals to Laurel Lance (Earth-2) that it was the new Green Arrow, who killed Diaz.

The character is based on the New 52 version of Richard Dragon, who goes by the name of Ricardo Diaz Jr.

=== Emiko Queen / Green Arrow ===
Emiko Queen (portrayed by Sea Shimooka; main: season 7; guest: season 8), also referred to as Emiko Adachi, is Robert Queen's illegitimate daughter and Oliver Queen's paternal half-sister. She is also revealed to be a main antagonist of the season seven arc. When she and her mother are abandoned by Robert Queen, Emiko begins working as a courier for criminal organizations, through which she comes in contact with Dante, a member of the Ninth Circle. Dante takes Emiko under his wing and starts training her, but she still holds out hope to reconnect with the Queens. However, Dante tells her to choose between her family and the Ninth Circle. When Robert is unwilling to acknowledge Emiko as his child and turns down her proposal for a company called Queen Materials, Emiko chooses not to give him information about the explosives planted on board the Queen's Gambit before the voyage where it sank. Rising through the ranks, Emiko is secretly the leader of the Ninth Circle by the events of season seven.

She takes up the mantle of Green Arrow while Oliver Queen is incarcerated at Slabside Maximum Security Prison. Her mother, Kazumi Adachi, was mysteriously murdered at the Glades a year prior to Oliver's outing as Green Arrow. Being an accomplished gymnast and trained in combat by Dante, her skills and tactics match Oliver's. She initially had no intention to become a vigilante until her mother's murder. Needing a disguise, she chooses to have hers based on Oliver's after he reveals himself being the Green Arrow. Therefore, she has legitimate claims to the Green Arrow name based on abilities in addition to being a Queen. Parallel to Oliver's first year as the Hood, Emiko hunts down people on her list, later revealing that they are possible leads to her mother's killers. She also steals from them to help those in need. As Green Arrow, she helps in defeating Ricardo Diaz, which allows Oliver to be released from prison. Because of this, Oliver trusts his mysterious successor despite not knowing the archer's identity, and after he discovers his relation to her, he tries to connect to his half-sister. Rene Ramirez, who also trusts the archer due to her saving his daughter Zoe's life, serves as a liaison between her and Team Arrow, and later after he discovers her identity and senses that she needs a friend, offers her his friendship. Emiko's identity as Oliver's half-sister is revealed in the episode "Unmasked", when she visits their father's empty grave. She is determined to avenge her mother's death.

When Oliver resumes his role as the Green Arrow, Emiko adopts a new red outfit similar to her comic book counterpart's (and by extension her legal sister Thea's). The bond between Emiko and Oliver is broken in the episode "Inheritance", when her alliance with Dante and the Ninth Circle is revealed. Eventually, Oliver reveals to Emiko that Dante had her mother killed to manipulate her, which leads to her killing Dante. Emiko later reveals to Oliver that her goal is to destroy Oliver's legacy, forcing her half-brother to die as a villain. Emiko returns to occasionally using the Green Arrow outfit in an attempt to fool the SCPD into thinking that Oliver and his team are behind the terrorist threat facing Star City. Emiko's focus on her personal vendetta publicly exposes the Ninth Circle. This, combined with her failure to deliver on her promise to destroy Star City and her hesitation to finally kill Oliver, leads to the organization's council turning on her. Emiko and Oliver fight the Ninth Circle together until Emiko is mortally wounded by Ninth Circle member Beatrice. Emiko dies after making amends with Oliver and is buried under the name "Emiko Adachi Queen".

In season eight following the Crisis and the formation of Earth-Prime, Emiko is alive again as she attends Oliver's funeral. She is welcomed into the family by Moira.

The character is based on the DC Comics character Emiko Queen.

=== Mia Smoak ===
Mia Smoak / Blackstar (portrayed primarily by Katherine McNamara; main: season 8; recurring: season 7) is the daughter of Oliver Queen and Felicity Smoak, born in 2019. Raised in secrecy away from Star City in Bloomfield, a neighborhood for former A.R.G.U.S. and DIA agents, she grew up without her father. Mia is an accomplished fighter due to being trained by Nyssa al Ghul throughout her childhood and into adulthood. After learning that her mother is still secretly operating as a vigilante, Mia runs away from home and goes to Star City, taking on the alias Blackstar. When she is first encountered in the 2040 flashforwards, Blackstar is a cagefighter, open about her resentment of vigilantes. Eventually she meets up with Dinah Drake, Roy Harper, Zoe Ramirez and her half-brother William, who are trying to find out what happened to Felicity. The two half-siblings, who previously did not know of each other, connect, and Mia asks William about what kind of a man their father was. Mia and her partner Connor join the group to rescue Felicity from the Galaxy One company after which Mia reconciles with her mother, having learned about the hardships Felicity and Oliver had gone through. After taking down Galaxy One, Felicity, Dinah and Roy entrust Mia, Connor, William and Zoe with protection of Star City.

When battling John Diggle Jr., the son of her father's partner, the new Deathstroke – with her own Team Arrow, Mia, William, and Connor inexplicably time travel to 2019, and Mia meets her father before his prophesied death. Not stranded in the past due to Oliver having allies with means for time travel and thus being able to return home at any time, Mia initially keeps her distance from her father out of resentment, but ultimately decides to get to know him before returning to her time. During the multi-universal Crisis caused by the Anti-Monitor, Oliver chooses Mia to be his successor as Green Arrow.

After the Crisis, Mia's history has changed. In the new timeline in 2040, Mia grew up with William in Star City as a wealthy heiress, her family's name is redeemed after Oliver's sacrifices as Green Arrow and thus can use her father's surname as Mia Queen, was never trained by Nyssa and is engaged to J.J. She is just graduated from college and got a job offer from William. However, Laurel restored Mia's memories and training from the initial timeline, and with the city again at risk of being attacked once more, she becomes the Green Arrow. Having remembered J.J.'s villainy also caused Mia to reconsider his proposal to her. Sara Lance later visited Mia to bring her to Oliver's upcoming funeral. After mentioning how her time period's William was abducted by unknown people, Mia rescues a younger William from her father's old enemy John Byrne. Afterwards, she provides support to her mother's past self and attend her father's funeral before returning to her own time.

After the Crisis, William's life is altered after a timeline change; he grew up with Mia and is the heir of the Queen Estate and CEO of SmoakTech after his stepmother mysteriously disappeared, and Harris Consolidated does not exist in name since he did not change his in this timeline. After Mia becomes the Green Arrow, the public suspects William has become his father's successor, and then later kidnapped. Back in the present, a younger William is abducted as Mia mentions to Team Arrow what happened to her time period's William. He is rescued from John Byrne by Mia, and later bonds with his half-sister's future self.

Atter two years ago, Iris helps Mia with a lead on William and convinces her to visit Felicity Smoak.

=== William Clayton ===
William Clayton (portrayed by Ben Lewis; main: season 8; recurring: season 7) is Oliver's illegitimate son with Samantha Clayton. William first appears in season four as a child, portrayed by Jack Moore (guest: seasons 4–5; recurring: season 6) He learns of his relation to Oliver and discovers his father's secret at the end of season five. In season six, William is living with Oliver after his mother Samantha is killed by Prometheus. While his faith in superheroes is shattered after Oliver's failure to save his mother, he eventually bonds with him and begins seeing Felicity as a surrogate mother. She also inspires William into the fields of engineering and technology. In season seven, after becoming the target of criminals like Damien Darhk, Adrian Chase, Ricardo Diaz, and Stanley Dover, William chooses to go live with his grandparents to have a normal life away from the Green Arrow. Unbeknownst to him, his grandparents later sever all of his ties with his father and stepmother, leading him to believe that they have abandoned him.

In the 2040 flashforwards, William is a wealthy adult and the owner of a company called Harris Consolidated, secretly funded by Felicity and thus a schism of SmoakTech. He is also revealed to be gay. He also erased evidence that he is Oliver Queen's son and changed his last name to Harris. Following clues left by Felicity, William brings together a group of people that include his father's old associates Dinah Drake and Roy Harper, Zoe Ramirez and Mia Smoak, the secret daughter of Oliver and Felicity. The two half-siblings form a relationship and together with their allies set out to save Star City. William accepts his role in the mission, defying his stepmother's attempt to bench him. After William inexplicably time travels to 2019 with his teammates, he works alongside his father in preparations of the Crisis. In addition, William helps in building relationships between his father and Mia.

After the Crisis, William's life is altered after a timeline change; he grew up with Mia and is the heir of the Queen Estate and CEO of SmoakTech after his stepmother mysteriously disappeared, and Harris Consolidated does not exist in name since he did not change his in this timeline. After Mia becomes the Green Arrow, the public suspects William has become his father's successor, and then later kidnapped. Back in the present, a younger William is abducted. He is rescued from John Byrne by Mia, and later bonds with his half-sister's future self.

=== Connor Hawke ===
Connor Hawke (portrayed by Joseph David-Jones; main: season 8; recurring: season 7) is the biological son of Ben Turner. Appearing as a child (portrayed by Aiden Stoxx; guest: seasons 7–8) in the present timeline, John Diggle provides Connor with a safe A.R.G.U.S. site while his father helps Team Arrow save Star City from the Ninth Circle. Connor appears primarily in the 2040 flashforwards, where he works as an agent of Knightwatch, who are described as a "good version of A.R.G.U.S." Connor is revealed to have been adopted by Diggle and Lyla Michaels under yet-to-be-revealed circumstances. Diggle entrusted Connor with the secret of Mia Smoak's parentage and asked him to protect her. While Connor starts working together with Mia, with the two also sharing a romantic connection, he initially does not reveal his occupation or the fact that he knows her parentage. He has a strained relationship with his adoptive brother John Diggle Jr., who has become the leader of a criminal Deathstroke gang. After the Crisis, details of Connor's life has drastically changed as he is now the son of Sandra Hawke and Ben Turner/Bronze Tiger. He is a recovering drug addict and still having a strained relationship with J.J.

Another version of the character, also played by David-Jones, was originally introduced in Legends of Tomorrow as Oliver Queen's Green Arrow successor of Earth-16. But the name, however, was the alias for John Diggle Jr.

The character is based on the DC Comics character Connor Hawke.

=== Mar Novu / The Monitor ===
Mar Novu, known as The Monitor (portrayed by LaMonica Garrett; main: season 8; guest: season 7), is a Multiversal being testing different Earths in the multiverse in preparation for an impending "crisis". During the Elseworlds crossover, the Monitor makes a deal with Oliver, helping him save Barry Allen and Kara Zor-El in exchange for Oliver's help during the crisis. In the season seven finale, the Monitor comes to collect Oliver, while also revealing he will die in the crisis.

In a flashforward to 2040, Monitor meets with Felicity where he plans to reunite her with Oliver in a location where there is no return.

In season eight, Monitor sends Oliver to Earth-2 to obtain Dwarf Star particles, unique to that universe. In "Fadeout," it is revealed that the location that Monitor took Felicity to was the afterlife.

The character is based on the DC Comics character Monitor.

== Supporting characters ==
Character	Portrayed by	First appearance	Seasons							
Character	Portrayed by	First appearance	1	2	3	4	5	6	7	8
Walter Steele	Colin Salmon	"Pilot"	Recurring	Recurring						
Raisa	Kathleen Gati	"Pilot"	Guest					Recurring		
Robert Queen	Jamey Sheridan	"Pilot"	Recurring		Guest	Guest	Guest		Guest	
Joanna De La Vega	Annie Ilonzeh	"Pilot"	Recurring	Guest						
Lucas Hilton	Roger Cross	"Pilot"	Recurring	Guest	Guest					
Sara Lance / The Canary / White Canary	Jacqueline MacInnes Wood	"Pilot"	Guest							
Sara Lance / The Canary / White Canary	Caity Lotz	"City of Heroes"		Recurring	Recurring	Recurring	Guest	Guest	Guest	Guest
Chien Na Wei / China White	Kelly Hu	"Honor Thy Father"	Recurring	Guest	Guest		Guest		Guest	Guest
Yao Fei Gulong	Byron Mann	"Lone Gunmen"	Recurring				Guest			Guest
Carly Diggle	Christie Laing	"Lone Gunmen"	Recurring							
Edward Fyers	Sebastian Dunn	"Damaged"	Recurring							Guest
Kate Spencer	Chelah Horsdal	"Damaged"	Guest	Recurring						
McKenna Hall	Janina Gavankar	"Vertigo"	Recurring							
Frank Pike	Adrian Holmes	"Betrayal"	Guest	Recurring	Guest	Guest	Recurring	Guest		
Shado/Mei	Celina Jade	"The Odyssey"	Recurring	Recurring	Guest	Guest		Guest		
Frank Chen	Chin Han	"Dodger"	Recurring							
Lyla Michaels / Harbinger	Audrey Marie Anderson	"Unfinished Business"	Guest	Recurring	Recurring	Recurring	Recurring	Recurring	Recurring	Recurring
Isabel Rochev	Summer Glau	"City of Heroes"		Recurring						
Adam Donner	Dylan Bruce	"City of Heroes"		Recurring						
Bethany Snow	Keri Adams	"City of Heroes"		Recurring	Recurring	Recurring	Recurring	Recurring	Recurring	Guest
Ben Turner / Bronze Tiger	Michael Jai White	"Identity"		Guest					Recurring	
Sebastian Blood / Brother Blood	Kevin Alejandro	"Identity"		Recurring						
Jean Loring	Teryl Rothery	"Broken Dolls"		Recurring				Guest		
Cindy "Sin" Simone	Bex Taylor-Klaus	"Broken Dolls"		Recurring	Guest				Guest	
Daily	Jesse Hutch	"Crucible"		Recurring						
Anatoly Knyazev	David Nykl	"Crucible"		Recurring			Recurring	Recurring	Guest	Guest
Dr. Anthony Ivo	Dylan Neal	"League of Assassins"		Recurring						
Amanda Waller	Cynthia Addai-Robinson	"Keep Your Enemies Closer"		Recurring	Recurring	Guest				
Nyssa al Ghul	Katrina Law	"Heir to the Demon"		Guest	Recurring	Recurring	Guest	Guest	Guest	Guest
Maseo Yamashiro / Sarab	Karl Yune	"The Calm"			Recurring					
Tatsu Yamashiro	Rila Fukushima	"The Calm"			Recurring	Guest				Guest
Ted Grant / Wildcat	J. R. Ramirez	"The Calm"			Recurring					
Ray Palmer / The Atom	Brandon Routh	"The Calm"			Recurring	Recurring	Guest			Guest
Sara Diggle	Unknown	"The Calm"			Recurring	Recurring				
Akio Yamashiro	Brandon Nomura	"The Calm"			Recurring					
Ra's al Ghul	Matt Nable	"The Magician"			Recurring					
Donna Smoak	Charlotte Ross	"The Secret Origin of Felicity Smoak"			Guest	Recurring		Guest		
Daniel Brickwell / Brick	Vinnie Jones	"Left Behind"			Guest	Guest			Recurring	
Matthew Shrieve	Marc Singer	"The Return"			Recurring					
Andy Diggle	Eugene Byrd	"The Return"			Guest	Recurring				
Michael Amar / Murmur	Adrian Glynn McMorran	"The Offer"			Guest	Recurring				
Damien Darhk	Neal McDonough	"Green Arrow"				Recurring	Guest			
Baron Reiter	Jimmy Akingbola	"The Candidate"				Recurring				
Taiana Venediktov	Elysia Rotaru	"The Candidate"				Recurring				
Lonnie Machin / Anarky	Alexander Calvert	"The Candidate"				Recurring	Guest			
Conklin	Ryan Robbins	"Restoration"				Recurring				
Alex Davis	Parker Young	"Haunted"				Recurring				
Ruvé Adams	Janet Kidder	"Dark Waters"				Recurring				
Paul Holt	Chernier Hundal	"Dark Waters"				Recurring	Guest			
Noah Kuttler / Calculator	Tom Amandes	"Unchained"				Recurring		Guest		
Dr. Elisa Schwartz	Venus Terzo	"Unchained"				Guest	Guest	Recurring	Guest	Guest
Evelyn Sharp / Artemis	Madison McLaughlin	"Canary Cry"				Guest	Recurring			
Tobias Church	Chad L. Coleman	"Legacy"					Recurring			
Billy Malone	Tyler Ritter	"Legacy"					Recurring			
Viktor	Mike Dopud	"Legacy"					Recurring			
Rory Regan / Ragman	Joe Dinicol	"The Recruits"					Recurring		Guest	Guest
Susan Williams	Carly Pope	"A Matter of Trust"					Recurring			
Derek Sampson	Cody Runnels	"A Matter of Trust"					Guest		Recurring	
Konstantin Kovar	Dolph Lundgren	"So It Begins"					Recurring			
Ishmael Gregor	David Meunier	"So It Begins"					Recurring			
Talia al Ghul	Lexa Doig	"Who Are You?"					Recurring		Guest	Guest
Alena Whitlock	Kacey Rohl	"Second Chances"					Recurring	Guest	Recurring	
Vincent Sobel / Vigilante	Clayton Chitty	"Second Chances"					Recurring			
Vincent Sobel / Vigilante	Johann Urb	"Deathstroke Returns"						Recurring		
Emily Pollard	Laara Sadiq	"Spectre of the Gun"					Guest	Guest	Recurring	
Zoe Ramirez	Eliza Faria	"Spectre of the Gun"					Guest	Recurring	Recurring	Guest
Zoe Ramirez	Andrea Sixtos	"Level Two"							Recurring	Recurring
Samanda Watson	Sydelle Noel	"Tribute"						Recurring	Guest	
Cayden James	Michael Emerson	"Reversal"						Recurring		
Sheck	Tobias Jelinek	"Reversal"						Recurring		
Nick Anastas	Evan Roderick	"Deathstroke Returns"						Recurring	Recurring	
Sam Armand	Pej Vahdat	"Thanksgiving"						Recurring		
Kimberly Hill	Tina Huang	"All for Nothing"						Recurring		
P. Parks	Josh Byer	"Doppelganger"						Recurring		
Stanley Dover	Brendan Fletcher	"Inmate 4587"							Recurring	
Honor / Silencer	Miranda Edwards	"The Longbow Hunters"							Recurring	
Kodiak	Michael Jonsson	"The Longbow Hunters"							Recurring	
Bell	David Stuart	"The Longbow Hunters"							Recurring	
Keven Dale (adult)	Raj Paul	"My Name Is Emiko Queen"							Recurring	
Virgil	Christopher Gerard	"Brothers & Sisters"							Recurring	
Sgt. F. Bingsley	Danny Wattley	"Training Day"							Recurring	
John Diggle Jr. (adult)	Charlie Barnett	"Starling City"								Recurring
