= Unchained (Arrow) =

- Arrow episode
- Episode no.: Season 4 Episode 12
- Directed by: Kevin Fair
- Written by: Speed Weed; Beth Schwartz
- Cinematography by: Corey Robson
- Editing by: Carol Stutz
- Production code: 3J5812
- Original air date: February 3, 2016
- Running time: 41 minutes

Guest appearances
- Colton Haynes as Roy Harper / Arsenal (special guest star); Celina Jade as Shado; Katrina Law as Nyssa al Ghul; Rila Fukushima as Tatsu Yamashiro; Echo Kellum as Curtis Holt; Jimmy Akingbola as Baron Reiter; Parker Young as Alex Davis; Tom Amandes as Noah Kuttler / The Calculator; Natasha Gayle as Mesi Natifah; Janet Kidder as Ruvé Adams; Elysia Rotaru as Taiana Venediktov; Venus Terzo as Dr. Elisa Schwartz

Episode chronology
← Previous "A.W.O.L."	Next → "Sins of the Father"
- Arrow season 4

"Unchained" is the 12th episode of the fourth season of The CW series Arrow and 81st overall. The episode was written by Speed Weed and Beth Schwartz and directed by Kevin Fair. It was first broadcast on February 3, 2016, on The CW.

The episode revolves about an attack of a burglar but discover that he is in fact Roy Harper (Colton Haynes), who is being extorted by a man named The Calculator, who is assembling devices to develop a bomb. Meanwhile, Thea continues to fall under the effects of the Lazarus Pit and her bloodlust, but Nyssa may have found an answer for her problem.

The episode received mostly positive reviews, with critics praising Roy's return and The Calculator's performance in the episode.

== Plot ==
On Lian Yu, Reiter tortures Oliver to know about the maps while Taiana is forced to watch. Suddenly, everyone in the room is shot down by someone with a bow and arrow, revealed to be Shado. She frees him but they both acknowledge that they're in Oliver's hallucination for his injuries. She tells him that he needs to forgive himself for what he has done by freeing the darkness inside him and to tell Taiana about killing Vlad. When he regains consciousness, he confesses to Taiana that he did in fact killed his brother. This causes Taiana to suffer a breakdown.

Five years later, Nyssa escapes from her confinement in Nanda Parbat with the help from Mesi Natifah and escapes with some loyalists to her. In Starling City, the team goes after a burglar. However, when Thea catches to him, she falls unconscious and the burglar escapes. In the hideout, the team deduce that this is a side effect of her bloodlust for not having killed anyone on a long time.

Meanwhile, Felicity needs to make a presentation in Palmer Tech but fails to get the recognition from the board committee. Malcolm visits Thea and tells Oliver that Thea needs to kill her killer, but as Ra's is dead, Thea needs to kill someone else or she will die. The burglar appears again and this time, Oliver catches him but discovers to his shock that the burglar is Roy. With his surprise, Roy escapes, the team convinced he is somehow brainwashed. Meanwhile, Oliver is notified by Alex that Ruvé Adams is running for mayor, causing Oliver to confront her as the Green Arrow.

The team discovers Roy's next move is to steal a device from Palmer Tech. Roy shows up in Palmer Tech and attacks Curtis until Oliver knocks him out with an arrow. In the hideout, they find a camera len in his eye and remove it. Roy wakes up and states that in Hub City, he was being extorted by someone called "The Calculator" to commit crimes for him or he would reveal his identity to the world. In Kyushu, Nyssa goes to retrieve the lotus from Tatsu, who was assigned to protect it. They engage in a sword fight but as they're equally skilled, Tatsu gives up and gives her the lotus, stating there's something concerning Oliver.

Roy visits Thea but then, she begins to cough and Ra's wound begins to emerge from her chest. Malcolm manages to avoid the extension of the wound. Felicity attempts to decode the identity of Roy's extortionist but the Calculator is aware of their intention and using a voice cover, expels them from the system. However, Felicity and Oliver discover that he was hired to download a nuke throughout the network and kill people and is the main reason for coercing Roy to get the devices needed.

Finding the location of the placement of the bomb, Oliver, Roy, Diggle and Laurel infiltrate and take down the terrorists. However, the bomb needs to be activated so the damage is collateral, otherwise, it will affect the city. Roy decides to stay behind and activate the bomb while the rest escape. Using an arrow, Roy escapes in time just as the explosion takes place. Felicity also manages to send a virus to the Calculator's computer, erasing Roy's history.

Felicity manages to make the presentation in Palmer Tech, receiving an ovation from the public. One of the attendees is the Calculator, who speaks with Oliver, unaware of his identity. The Calculator later appears to Felicity, who calls him her father. Thea slips into a coma and Oliver is told by the doctor that Thea may never recover. He is then visited by Nyssa, who explains that she has the Lotus, an elixir that can reverse the side effects of the Pit and she offers to give it to him for Thea, on the condition that he kills Malcolm.

== Production ==
On November 20, 2015, Marc Guggenheim revealed that the 12th episode for the fourth season would be titled "Unchained" and was to be directed by Kevin Fair and written by Speed Weed and Beth Schwartz. Preparation ran from November 10 until November 19, 2015. Shooting ran from November 20 until December 3, 2015.

== Reception ==
=== Ratings ===
The episode was watched by 2.48 million viewers with a 0.9/3 share among adults aged 18 to 49.

=== Critical response ===
"Unchained" received mostly positive reviews from critics. Jesse Schedeen of IGN gave the episode an "amazing" 9.4 out of 10 and wrote in his verdict, "While the prospect of Roy Harper returning to Star City was exciting, it was impossible to predict just how well this week's Arrow would turn out. 'Unchained' fired on all cylinders, offering a healthy blend of banter, action and dark character drama. Haynes delivered a great performance as he helped give his character more closure, but he was far from the only actor to shine this week."

The A.V. Club's Alasdair Wilkins gave the episode a "B+" grade and wrote, "'Unchained' is a grand cavalcade of returning guest stars, with one very addition to the show's mythos. Roy is the star attraction here, considering he was once a series regular and all. The episode recaptures precisely what Roy represented for Arrow during his tenure, all of which boils down to three key elements. First, there's the parkour, now and forever, and I deeply appreciate Arrow going to the trouble of giving us the most Roy Harper-ish reintroduction possible with his various chase sequences. Second, there's his relationship with Thea, which was one of the show's strongest elements when it was still finding itself back in the first season and gave both Willa Holland and Colton Haynes space to define their performances and create a compelling subplot that had little to do with Oliver's activities."

Andy Behbakht of TV Overmind gave the episode a 3.5 star rating out of 5 and wrote "Despite that many of my favorites, including Roy, returned for this episode, 'Unchained' felt it was a little all over the place, despite how smoothly a lot of things came together in the end. But despite of that, it was fun to see so many old faces, especially with Roy who, despite the trouble he had gotten into thanks to Calculator, felt a lot more mature and grown-up this time around."

Jonathon Dornbush of EW stated: "Oliver Queen has a tendency to hang onto things. He lets the weight of the world rest on his shoulders so often it's amazing he still has such great posture. And 'Unchained,' both in its present-day and flashback scenes, is about Oliver coming to terms with the idea that he can't control everyone else's life. Try as he might, they're still people in their own right, who are allowed to make their own decisions instead of letting the Green Arrow to decree the course of their lives."

Carissa Pavlica from TV Fanatic, gave a 3.25 star rating out of 5.0, stating: "That could have been much better. From fan reactions online, I don't expect this to be the popular opinion. Which isn't a surprise. But as a storytelling device, Arrow Season 4 Episode 12 was all over the place. It was an hour of moments rather than a truly good episode of television. And, yes, there were a lot of moments during 'Unchained.' Some of them very good, thankfully."

Noel Kirkpatrick of TV.com wrote positive about the episode, stating "The pleasure in 'Unchained,' at least in contrast to 'A.W.O.L.,' was that it wasn't about setting up and then delaying gratification. Instead, it ended up an entertaining first installment of a stealth two-parter, which, by the way, is the best way to do two-parters. It prevents the first part from being boring exposition delivery and deck chair arranging for the fun stuff in the next part."
