= Arrow season 4 =

2015–16 season of American TV series

Arrow
- Season 4
- Home media cover
- Showrunners: Wendy Mericle; Marc Guggenheim
- Starring: Stephen Amell; Katie Cassidy; David Ramsey; Willa Holland; Emily Bett Rickards; John Barrowman; Paul Blackthorne
- No. of episodes: 23

Release
- Original network: The CW
- Original release: October 7, 2015 – May 25, 2016

Season chronology
- ← Previous; Season 3 Next → Season 5

The fourth season of the American television series Arrow premiered on The CW on October 7, 2015, and concluded on May 25, 2016, with a total of 23 episodes. The series is based on the DC Comics character Green Arrow, a costumed crime-fighter created by Mort Weisinger and George Papp, and is set in the Arrowverse, sharing continuity with other Arrowverse television series. The showrunners for this season were Marc Guggenheim and Wendy Mericle. Stephen Amell stars as Oliver Queen, with principal cast members Katie Cassidy as Laurel Lance, David Ramsey as John Diggle, Willa Holland as Thea Queen, Emily Bett Rickards as Felicity Smoak, John Barrowman as Malcolm Merlyn and Paul Blackthorne as Quentin Lance also returning from previous seasons.

The series follows billionaire playboy Oliver Queen (Stephen Amell), who claimed to have spent five years shipwrecked on Lian Yu, a mysterious island in the North China Sea, before returning home to Starling City (later renamed "Star City") to fight crime and corruption as a secret vigilante whose weapon of choice is a bow and arrow. In the fourth season, Oliver and Felicity try and start a new life in Ivy Town, but they return to Starling City, now renamed Star City, when a terrorist group known as H.I.V.E. led by the mystically enhanced Damien Darhk (Neal McDonough) is attacking the city. Oliver resumes vigilantism under the new moniker of "Green Arrow". John discovers his brother Andy (Eugene Byrd) is alive and a H.I.V.E. soldier; Thea works with Oliver as "Speedy", but with a violent temper; Laurel attempts to resurrect Sara using the Lazarus Pit; and Curtis Holt (Echo Kellum) aids Felicity and the team. Oliver's life as a vigilante and with Felicity are complicated by his mayoral run and the discovery of the existence of his son, William (Jack Moore). Laurel dies in a fight with Damien and Oliver discovers his plan to detonate nuclear weapons and rule the Earth's remains. The season features flashbacks to Oliver's fourth year since he was presumed dead, where Amanda Waller sends Oliver back to Lian Yu to infiltrate Shadowspire, where he meets John Constantine (Matt Ryan) and encounters a mystical idol used by Darhk in the present-day narrative.

The series was renewed for its fourth season in January 2015, and filming began in Vancouver, British Columbia, Canada that July and ended in April 2016. The season premiere received a positive critical response, however the season as a whole was received more negatively. The season averaged 2.9 million viewers each week. This season includes the second annual Arrowverse crossover with TV series The Flash, which served as an introduction to spin-off TV series Legends of Tomorrow. It also featured the first live-action appearance of Megalyn Echikunwoke as Vixen, from the eponymous animated web series, as well as an appearance by Matt Ryan reprising his role as John Constantine from the NBC series Constantine. The season was released on DVD and Blu-ray on August 30, 2016. The series was renewed for a fifth season on March 11, 2016.

== Episodes ==
Arrow, season 4 episodes
No. overall	No. in season	Title	Directed by	Written by	Original release date	Prod. code	U.S. viewers (millions)
70	1	"Green Arrow"	Thor Freudenthal	Story by : Greg Berlanti & Beth Schwartz; Teleplay by : Marc Guggenheim & Wendy Mericle	October 7, 2015	3J5801	2.67
John Diggle, Thea Queen, and Laurel Lance continue fighting crime in Starling City, recently renamed 'Star City' in honor of Ray Palmer, who has apparently died in an explosion. The city's leadership, including Quentin Lance, assemble to discuss a criminal entity named the "Ghosts" who are terrorizing the city. Damien Darhk, revealed to be controlling the Ghosts, systematically begins assassinating the present leaders, but fails to kill Quentin. Laurel and Thea convince Oliver Queen, who was trying to propose to Felicity Smoak, to leave Ivy Town and return to help them, which Diggle reluctantly approves. Oliver realizes that Felicity has been helping the team. The group tracks the Ghosts, where they witness Darhk using some form of mystical energy manipulation. Oliver notices Thea's excessive aggressiveness. Working together, the team stops Darhk's terrorist attack. Diggle deduces that Darhk is leading H.I.V.E. Afterward, taking the name "Green Arrow", Oliver broadcasts a message to the city vowing to be a beacon of hope, while Quentin is shown to be working with Darhk under duress. In flashbacks, Amanda Waller finds Oliver and forces him back to Lian Yu in order to assess a new threat. He is captured upon arrival.
71	2	"The Candidate"	John Behring	Marc Guggenheim & Keto Shimizu	October 14, 2015	3J5802	2.50
Queen family friend Jessica Danforth decides to run for mayor. During her announcement, she is attacked by Lonnie Machin, an anarchist for hire working for Darhk. Oliver explains to his sister that her aggressiveness is a result of being in the Lazarus Pit. Diggle tells Laurel about H.I.V.E. The team successfully stops Machin, but Thea sets him on fire in the process. Later, Machin escapes police custody. Laurel decides to take Thea back to Nanda Parbat, both to find a way to stop the aggression and to bring Sara Lance's body to the pit. Oliver runs for mayor after Danforth backs out of the race. Meanwhile, Felicity takes over for Ray at the company and tasks an employee named Curtis Holt with fixing the financial crisis. In flashbacks, Oliver defeats a soldier and is instructed by Waller to infiltrate the local military operation run by an officer named Reiter. Reiter recruits Oliver for his cause instead of killing him.
72	3	"Restoration"	Wendey Stanzler	Wendy Mericle & Speed Weed	October 21, 2015	3J5803	2.40
Laurel and Thea arrive in Nanda Parbat and request Malcolm Merlyn use the Lazarus Pit for Sara. He initially refuses and tells Thea that she needs to kill some people once in a while to suppress the bloodlust. In order to appease her, he eventually agrees to revive Sara. When Sara returns feral, Nyssa al Ghul destroys the Lazarus Pit in retaliation and Merlyn has her imprisoned. Meanwhile, an A.R.G.U.S. operative brings Diggle information on H.I.V.E. operative Mina Fayad. Fayad meets with Darhk about the growing vigilante issue in Star City. She introduces a metahuman named Jeremy Tell, who can turn his playing card tattoos into physical projectiles. After Tell's initial failure, Darhk murders Fayad for challenging him. Felicity reveals to Curtis that she is aiding Green Arrow. Diggle and Green Arrow team up and take down Tell, who refuses to talk because he fears Darhk more. He is imprisoned in Iron Heights. In flashbacks, in order to impress his handler, Oliver uses torture techniques to interrogate the prisoners being used to harvest heroin-cocaine hybrid plants. He secretly frees a woman.
73	4	"Beyond Redemption"	Lexi Alexander	Beth Schwartz & Ben Sokolowski	October 28, 2015	3J5805	2.64
Quentin has Green Arrow look into the death of two police officers and the group learns they were murdered by members of the Anti-Vigilante Task Force. Laurel brings Quentin to see Sara, who is chained up in the basement of Laurel's apartment. Felicity identifies Liza Warner as a suspect and, while searching for her, Oliver discovers Quentin meeting with Darhk. When confronted, Quentin reveals that Darhk threatened to murder Laurel. Darhk advises Quentin to kill Sara, but Laurel dissuades him. Green Arrow and the team stop the corrupt officers just before Liza attempts to kill the vigilante, but Quentin convinces her to surrender. Later, Oliver asks Quentin to spy on Darhk and announces his candidacy, Felicity opens an audio file of Palmer's apparent final moments, and Laurel finds that Sara has escaped. In flashbacks, Oliver gets Taiana, the woman he freed, to a cave and convinces an officer named Conklin of her death, but Conklin discovers Oliver's A.R.G.U.S. communication device.
74	5	"Haunted"	John Badham	Brian Ford Sullivan & Oscar Balderrama	November 4, 2015	3J5804	2.60
In flashbacks, Reiter dismisses Conklin's accusation of Oliver. Instead, he introduces them to a recent captive named John Constantine, who escapes and forces Oliver to help him locate a mystical object on the island. Afterwards, Constantine warns Oliver to be wary of Reiter's real plans and uses the object to cast a spell on him. In the present, Sara starts killing women and Green Arrow discovers she is alive. The team realizes that Sara is looking for Thea and plans to murder her. They capture Sara and Oliver contacts Constantine, who helps restore Sara's soul. Meanwhile, Darhk gives Quentin a new task to install a computer virus in a security company. Diggle goes along and sees his brother's name among the list of individuals being deleted by the virus. Later, Felicity and Curtis realize that Palmer is still alive and Diggle learns that his brother was killed because he was a drug cartel leader.
75	6	"Lost Souls"	Antonio Negret	Beth Schwartz & Emilio Ortega Aldrich	November 11, 2015	3J5806	2.30
As Oliver works on his campaign, Felicity continues searching for Ray with the help of Curtis. Ray is able to send a new message, letting Felicity know that he survived the explosion because his suit successfully shrank him down to a small size, that he is being held prisoner, and where to find the schematics to build a device to return him to his normal size. In a second message, Felicity discovers that Darhk is the one imprisoning Ray, hoping to get the technology from his suit. The team tracks Darhk to his hideout and, with the machine created by Curtis, they successfully save and restore Ray to normal size. Thea starts dating Alex Davis while Quentin and Donna Smoak start seeing each other, as well. Using Ray's technology, Darhk tests a power source on a mystical board. Meanwhile, Sara struggles with the bloodlust and decides to leave Star City to gain control. In flashbacks, Reiter sends Oliver searching for another ancient ruin that is supposed to yield a "gift" for Reiter. Conklin has a worker turn on Oliver. When Oliver kills the man in self-defense, it gives Conklin the opportunity to have Reiter punish Oliver.
76	7	"Brotherhood"	James Bamford	Speed Weed & Keto Shimizu	November 18, 2015	3J5807	2.69
Following his ordeal, Ray refuses to return to Palmer Tech. H.I.V.E. destroys money meant for the city bank. John tells Oliver that H.I.V.E. murdered his brother Andy because he was a criminal rival. Darhk knows about Quentin's betrayal and tells him so. The group heads to a lab, where they are attacked by Darhk's men and John discovers that Andy is still alive, working for H.I.V.E. John refuses to see Andy as anything more than a traitor, unworthy of saving. The team finds out that Darhk uses pills to control his operatives' minds, which could have been administered to Andy. They locate him and the rest of H.I.V.E., successfully extracting Andy with help from Ray and John. When John confronts him with damning documents, Andy confirms their validity. Although Darhk fails to drain her lifeforce during an encounter, Thea learns that his powers may help cure her bloodlust permanently. In flashbacks, Conklin reveals that the worker Oliver killed was Vald, Taiana's brother, but Oliver diverts the accusation, arguing that Conklin sent Vald to murder him. Reiter uncovers the truth by using a mystical object and has Oliver whip Conklin as punishment. Oliver later convinces Taiana to help him find a map.
77	8	"Legends of Yesterday"	Thor Freudenthal	Story by : Greg Berlanti & Marc Guggenheim; Teleplay by : Brian Ford Sullivan & Marc Guggenheim	December 2, 2015	3J5808	3.66
Malcolm orchestrates a meeting between Vandal Savage, Barry Allen, and Oliver. Savage demands they turn over Kendra Saunders and Carter Hall or he will destroy both Central City and Star City with the Staff of Horus. They devise a plan to deliver the pair as a ruse to get close enough to destroy the staff. The plan fails; Kendra and Carter are killed and Savage uses the staff to destroy everyone else in the city. Barry escapes and runs fast enough to go back in time to the point of the original negotiation. Barry informs Oliver of his time travel and the mistakes that led to their defeat. They change their plan and Barry is able to steal the staff. He and Oliver use it on Savage, burning his body. Afterward, Kendra and Carter decide to use their powers to help others in another city. Cisco gives her a tracking device. Meanwhile, Oliver learns about his son, William, and accepts the condition of Samantha Clayton, William's mother, not to tell William or anyone else about the paternity in order to be able to see him. Malcolm collects Savage's ashes while whispering, "You owe me one, buddy." Note: This episode concludes a crossover event that begins on The Flash season 2 episode 8. The two episodes also set up Legends of Tomorrow.
78	9	"Dark Waters"	John Behring	Wendy Mericle & Ben Sokolowski	December 9, 2015	3J5809	2.82
Oliver's campaign starts an initiative to clean up the Star City bay. Darhk sends a drone to the bay and begins shooting at the volunteering citizens, injuring several. In response, Oliver reveals Darhk to the media as the leader of both H.I.V.E. and the Ghosts. In retaliation, Darhk crashes Oliver's campaign holiday party and kidnaps John, Felicity, and Thea. Oliver makes contact and agrees to exchange himself for them. Darhk tricks Oliver and attempts to kill them all in front of him. Malcolm, dressed as Green Arrow, and Laurel arrive to rescue everyone. Afterward, Oliver proposes to Felicity, who accepts. As they leave, Darhk's men shoot up Oliver's limo and hit Felicity, while Darhk reunites with his wife and daughter. Meanwhile, H.I.V.E.'s plan, entitled Genesis, is shown to include the mass growing of corn in a large field. In flashbacks, Oliver returns to the ship the Amazo and acquires the maps. However, Conklin finds Taiana alive and confronts Oliver.
79	10	"Blood Debts"	Jesse Warn	Oscar Balderrama & Sarah Tarkoff	January 20, 2016	3J5810	2.83
While Felicity undergoes multiple surgeries, Oliver and the team continue searching for Darhk. Oliver turns to Quentin for information on Darhk's whereabouts while John interrogates his brother Andy. They track down Darhk's hideout, but only find several dead Ghost soldiers and an anarchy symbol, deducing that Machin is back and out for revenge against Darhk. Machin is caught and Oliver interrogates him right before freeing him to go after Darhk, tracking him in the process. Andy locates Darhk's family house, where Machin is also headed; the group arrives and saves Darhk's family, but Machin escapes. Darhk grants Oliver time to spend with his own family before Darhk resumes trying to kill him. Meanwhile, Felicity is left paralyzed from being shot. John mends his relationship with Andy. Darhk's wife, Ruvé Adams, is revealed to be his accomplice and H.I.V.E.'s plan is shown to be about destroying the world and rebuilding it. In flashbacks, Conklin presents his proof to Reiter, who allows Conklin to whip Oliver as punishment until Reiter notices the spell on Oliver's abdomen. In exchange for Taiana's safety, Oliver agrees to help Reiter.
80	11	"A.W.O.L."	Charlotte Brandström	Brian Ford Sullivan & Emilio Ortega Aldrich	January 27, 2016	3J5811	2.78
Felicity returns home from the hospital, trying to figure out her place on the team now that she is a paraplegic. An A.R.G.U.S. agent seeks out John and Lyla Michaels for assistance, but is kidnapped before he can tell the pair anything. The pair goes to Waller, who secretly gives her a portable hard drive that reveals the operative was taken by an organization known as "Shadowspire". John recognizes the name and recounts first meeting the war profiteering group in Afghanistan. With Andy's help, the team tracks Shadowspire. Oliver pressures Felicity for help, who has started having hallucinations of her hacker past self. Shadowspire infiltrates A.R.G.U.S. looking for the access codes to a project known as "Rubicon", killing Waller when she refuses to help. Oliver and the team, with Felicity's assistance, enter A.R.G.U.S. and stop Shadowspire. Oliver vows to look for a way to cure Felicity's paralysis; and John takes Andy to his house. In flashbacks, Reiter is revealed as the leader of Shadowspire.
81	12	"Unchained"	Kevin Fair	Speed Weed & Beth Schwartz	February 3, 2016	3J5812	2.48
The team goes after a burglar and Oliver and Thea manage to corner him. He escapes when Thea loses consciousness. Malcolm reveals to Oliver that since she has not taken a life, the bloodlust is killing her. Oliver finds out that the burglar is Roy Harper. They free Roy from the control of a man who goes by the name Calculator. Felicity tracks the Calculator through the web, who reveals he intends to shut down the entire city, killing everyone in the process. The team manages to stop the plan. Meanwhile, Ruvé enters the mayoral race. Thea slips into a coma. The Calculator is revealed to be Felicity's father, Noah Kuttler. Roy decides to leave again. Nyssa escapes her cell in Nanda Parbat, visits Tatsu Yamashiro and convinces her to give her the Lotus, a cure for Thea's bloodlust. She demands Oliver to kill Malcolm in exchange for Lotus. In flashbacks, Reiter tortures Oliver for information on the maps he acquired. Oliver has a mystical meeting with the soul of Shado, who gives him a special stone. He reveals to Taiana that he killed her brother.
82	13	"Sins of the Father"	Gordon Verheul	Ben Sokolowski & Keto Shimizu	February 10, 2016	3J5813	2.44
Oliver refuses Nyssa's offer; instead, he manages to convince Malcolm to relinquish control of the League to Nyssa in exchange for the Lotus. At the exchange, Malcolm double-crosses Nyssa and a war starts between the two assassin factions in Star City. Oliver convinces Malcolm to challenge Nyssa to a duel. Oliver uses ancient rules to trade places with Nyssa as her husband. Oliver defeats Malcolm but, instead of killing him, severs the hand wearing the Demon's Head ring and exchanges the ring for the Lotus. Nyssa disbands the League and destroys the ring. Malcolm informs Darhk about Oliver's son, William. Meanwhile, Noah reveals to Felicity that he is the Calculator, claiming to have changed into a good person. She finds out that he is lying and turns him over to the police. In flashbacks, Taiana takes the stone from Oliver and gives it to Reiter, demanding her freedom, which Reiter refuses to do and tasks her to help Oliver recover. She later reconciles with him. Reiter informs Oliver that the stone led to the location of what he seeks; and they are going to "dig".
83	14	"Code of Silence"	James Bamford	Wendy Mericle & Oscar Balderrama	February 17, 2016	3J5814	2.44
Malcolm joins Darhk, Ruvé, and the other leaders of H.I.V.E. and it is revealed that they are moving on to "Phase 5" of their plan. Darhk sends a group of mercenaries, known as the Demolition Team, to take out Quentin, whom Laurel saves. With Curtis' help, Felicity realizes that the Demolition Team is planning to destroy the building of the mayoral debate between Oliver and Ruvé, leaving her alive as a sympathetic survivor. Oliver and his team stop the mercenaries in time for Oliver to win the debate. Oliver and Felicity become engaged and Curtis gives her a device that can cure her paralysis. Darhk kidnaps William. Meanwhile, Thea finds out about William and supports Oliver's decision to hide it from Felicity. Quentin tells Donna about his previous involvement with Darhk. In flashbacks, in order to gain the approval of the prisoners, Oliver kills Conklin, who reveals that Reiter plans to kill all the prisoners after he finds his "ultimate power".
84	15	"Taken"	Gregory Smith	Story by : Marc Guggenheim; Teleplay by : Keto Shimizu & Brian Ford Sullivan	February 24, 2016	3J5815	2.70
Darhk demands Oliver withdraw from the mayoral race in exchange for William. Oliver reveals the truth about William to the rest of the team while revealing his alter ego to Samantha. He asks a Detroit-based vigilante named Mari McCabe for help, as her powers are derived from magic. Mari tracks William's location; but they fail to rescue him. Oliver withdraws from the race while the team discovers the root of Darhk's powers and sets a plan to destroy his mystical idol. The plan works; Darhk is left powerless and arrested, while William is saved. They also discover that Malcolm was the one who kidnapped William. Later, Oliver sends William and his mother away for safety, planning to reveal the truth to William when he is 18. Felicity decides to break up with Oliver while she recovers her ability to walk. In flashbacks, a passage is discovered that leads to Reiter's "ultimate power" and the spell on Oliver's stomach allows him to pass unharmed.
85	16	"Broken Hearts"	John Showalter	Rebecca Bellotto & Nolan Dunbar	March 23, 2016	3J5816	2.09
Carrie Cutter returns to Star City and begins targeting high profile couples. While the team works to track her whereabouts and prevent any more killings, Laurel works on Darhk's prosecution. After several failed attempts to find a suitable witness, Quentin testifies to his involvement. The team discovers that Carrie is targeting couples that have recently been married. In order to draw her out, Oliver convinces Felicity to stage a "secret" wedding with him to set themselves up as targets, intentionally leaking the information to the media. The plan works and Carrie attacks Oliver and Felicity at the ceremony. Felicity distracts her long enough for Diggle and Thea to apprehend her. Darhk's bail is denied and is remanded into custody. Quentin is suspended pending an investigation, while Felicity quits the team for good. In custody, Darhk is shown wearing a mystical ring he secretly carried inside. In flashbacks, Oliver leads Reiter to a mystical idol, but steals it and runs off into the tunnels with Taiana. The pair incapacitate two mercenaries and acquire their guns.
86	17	"Beacon of Hope"	Michael Schultz	Ben Sokolowski & Brian Ford Sullivan	March 30, 2016	3J5817	2.34
Brie Larvan orchestrates her release from prison and travels to Star City in search of the bio-mechanical chip that helps Felicity walk. Brie attacks Palmer Tech, holding the board hostage until Felicity turns herself over. Curtis tracks down Oliver's hideout, discovering his secret in the process, so that he can offer his help to the team to save Felicity, Donna, and Thea. Oliver is stung by one of Brie's robotic bees. Curtis realizes the sting actually implanted a bee within Oliver that is replicating itself. Laurel uses her Canary Cry to save Oliver. Felicity is able to evacuate the board members, while Brie reveals she is after the chip because she has a tumor that is going to leave her paralyzed. Curtis develops a virus to shut down the bees and uses them to stop Brie. Meanwhile, Malcolm visits Darhk and informs him that H.I.V.E. is proceeding with "Genesis" without Darhk, who later gains the loyalty of Michael Amar. Andy is revealed to be still in allegiance with Darhk. In flashbacks, Oliver engages Reiter, whose powers from the idol dwindle; and Reiter escapes into the tunnels to recover it. Oliver and Taiana decide to save the prisoners instead.
87	18	"Eleven-Fifty-Nine"	Rob Hardy	Marc Guggenheim & Keto Shimizu	April 6, 2016	3J5818	2.24
Andy tells John that he was approached by Malcolm about a plan to break Darhk out of prison. Oliver and John foil H.I.V.E.'s plan, but it turns out to be a ruse designed to let Malcolm and his loyal assassins invade the bunker and steal Darhk's idol. Malcolm delivers the idol to Darhk, who finds out that it is incomplete. John reveals to Andy that he personally hid the missing piece in another location. Oliver becomes suspicious of Andy. Darhk and Amar orchestrate a prison riot and the team sets out to stop him with Andy joining them. However, when the team reaches Darhk, Andy turns on them and gives Darhk the missing piece to his idol. With his powers restored, Darhk subdues the team and stabs Laurel before escaping with Malcolm, Andy, and tens of other inmates. Laurel later dies at the hospital. In flashbacks, Oliver and Taiana help the prisoners escape and set off a bomb to bury Reiter in the tunnels. Reiter kills his two accompanying mercenaries in order to survive by the idol.
88	19	"Canary Cry"	Laura Belsey	Wendy Mericle & Beth Schwartz	April 27, 2016	3J5819	2.27
As the team, including the rejoined Felicity, mourns Laurel's death and tries to determine their next move against Darhk, another woman posing as the Black Canary appears in Star City. She turns out to be Evelyn Sharp, the daughter of H.I.V.E. prisoners who were left behind after Oliver saved his team when they were previously kidnapped by Darhk. John, angry at being betrayed by Andy, goes after Ruvé, the new mayor; but Oliver intervenes. Ruvé issues arrest warrants for all vigilantes. Sharp goes after Ruvé publicly, but the Green Arrow is able to dissuade her from killing Ruvé. Meanwhile, Quentin starts looking for ways to revive Laurel; but Oliver manages to dissuade him. At Laurel's funeral, Oliver reveals her as the Black Canary to preserve her image with the city. Afterwards, Oliver vows to find a way to defeat and kill Darhk. In flashbacks, Oliver and Laurel struggle to come to terms with Tommy Merlyn's death. In the end, Oliver leaves Laurel to cope on her own and returns to Lian Yu.
89	20	"Genesis"	Gregory Smith	Oscar Balderrama & Emilio Ortega Aldrich	May 4, 2016	3J5820	2.07
Darhk returns to H.I.V.E. and kills two of the board members before renewing his plans for "Genesis". Oliver and Felicity go to Hub City and meet an immortal shaman, Esrin Fortuna, who starts educating Oliver about dark magic. After a mystical ritual, Fortuna tells Oliver that the darkness inside him is too strong to channel the light. In Star City, John locates Andy, but is captured after a brief shootout. Andy places a tracking device on him, then allows John to escape so that Darhk and his team can go after John and Lyla and steal "Rubicon", the key to the world's nuclear weapons. Oliver manages to stop Darhk by channeling the power of light, nullifying Darhk's powers and forcing him to retreat. John kills Andy. Meanwhile, Thea and Alex, who is working for Ruvé now, go to an unknown city for vacation. She soon realizes that the city is atypical and finds out that Alex is using Darhk's mind control pills. She is subdued by Darhk's operatives and the city is revealed to be under Star City. The team realizes that Darhk plans to detonate nuclear weapons and build a new world over the ashes.
90	21	"Monument Point"	Kevin Tancharoen	Speed Weed & Jenny Lynn	May 11, 2016	3J5821	2.16
Darhk begins taking control of the world's nuclear missiles. The team seeks out Noah to help disable Rubicon. Darhk sends Danny Brickwell and Amar to find and kill Noah, but Oliver and his team are able to rescue him. Noah agrees to help, but it requires a high-powered processor from Palmer Tech. Felicity learns she has been fired as CEO and is unable to get the processor, forcing the team to break in and steal it. H.I.V.E. locates the team when Noah hacks into Rubicon. As H.I.V.E. attacks, Felicity and Noah shut down Rubicon and stop all the missiles but one, which launches and heads to Monument Point. Felicity only manages to redirect it to Havenrock, reducing the casualties to tens of thousands. Oliver and Diggle find Darhk in the Star City nexus chamber, gathering more power from all the deaths caused by the explosion. Meanwhile, in the underground city, Malcolm tells Thea it is designed to protect Darhk and his chosen people from the nuclear apocalypse. Machin attacks the city and kills Alex. In flashbacks, Reiter escapes the cave-in, but Oliver and Taiana steal the idol back. The idol then begins to affect Taiana.
91	22	"Lost in the Flood"	Glen Winter	Brian Ford Sullivan & Oscar Balderrama	May 18, 2016	3J5822	1.94
Darhk's power has grown exponentially and he attempts to reactivate "Rubicon" with the help of Felicity's former boyfriend, Cooper Seldon, and launch the remaining missiles. However, Noah, Felicity, and Curtis successfully shut down "Rubicon" for good. Meanwhile, Oliver and Diggle discover the underground town and track Thea's whereabouts. Malcolm uses a mind-controlling drug on her which makes her turn on Oliver, but Oliver manages to talk her back to reality. Just then, Machin takes over H.I.V.E.'s command center and threatens to destroy Darhk's town. Oliver, Diggle, and Thea intercede, but the main power source gets ruptured and explodes, destroying the city. The town is evacuated and Machin escapes, but not before killing Ruvé. Donna convinces Noah to leave and never come back. Darhk decides to use "Rubicon" to destroy the whole Earth and shows up at Oliver's home, where Felicity, Donna, and Curtis are. In flashbacks, the idol begins to slowly corrupt Taiana, feeding her ever more power from each soldier she and Oliver kill. Oliver takes the idol and tries to talk her down, but Reiter suddenly arrives and confronts them both.
92	23	"Schism"	John Behring	Story by : Greg Berlanti; Teleplay by : Wendy Mericle & Marc Guggenheim	May 25, 2016	3J5823	2.19
Darhk steals the laptop keeping him locked out of "Rubicon" and launches over 15,000 nuclear missiles, giving the team two hours to prevent worldwide annihilation. With Star City rioting, Oliver addresses everyone, inspiring hope in them to stay strong, while Felicity and Curtis divert the missile aimed at Star City. Oliver goes after Darhk, while Felicity, Merlyn, and Thea track down "Rubicon". Felicity convinces Cooper to stop helping Darhk, at the cost of his life. Curtis devises a means to stop the missiles. Oliver is able to nullify Darhk's powers with the hope he inspired throughout the city. While the citizens of Star City take on Darhk's remaining men, Oliver duels and kills Darhk. Afterward, Thea, Diggle and Lance, who gets fired from Star City Police Department (SCPD), leave the team for new lives, and the city council appoints Oliver as the interim mayor. In flashbacks, Oliver and Taiana manage to kill Reiter. She then convinces him to kill her when she is unable to escape the darkness within. Oliver radios Waller to rescue the rest of the prisoners and keep the idol safe, intending to go to Russia to meet Taiana's family as he promised.

== Cast and characters ==
=== Main ===
- Stephen Amell as Oliver Queen / Green Arrow
- Katie Cassidy as Laurel Lance / Black Canary
- David Ramsey as John Diggle / Spartan
- Willa Holland as Thea Queen / Speedy
- Emily Bett Rickards as Felicity Smoak / Overwatch
- John Barrowman as Malcolm Merlyn / Dark Archer
- Paul Blackthorne as Quentin Lance

=== Recurring ===
- Audrey Marie Anderson as Lyla Michaels
- Neal McDonough as Damien Darhk
- Grant Gustin as Barry Allen / Flash
- Alexander Calvert as Lonnie Machin / Anarky
- Caity Lotz as Sara Lance / Canary
- Jimmy Akingbola as Baron Reiter
- Ryan Robbins as Conklin
- Elysia Rotaru as Taiana Venediktov
- Echo Kellum as Curtis Holt
- Eugene Byrd as Andy Diggle
- Katrina Law as Nyssa al Ghul
- Brandon Routh as Ray Palmer / Atom
- Parker Young as Alex Davis
- Charlotte Ross as Donna Smoak
- Janet Kidder as Ruvé Adams
- Tom Amandes as Noah Kuttler / Calculator
- Adrian Glynn McMorran as Michael Amar / Murmur

=== Guest ===
- Cynthia Addai-Robinson as Amanda Waller
- Jeri Ryan as Jessica Danforth
- JR Bourne as Jeremy Tell / Double Down
- Rutina Wesley as Liza Warner / Lady Cop
- Matt Ryan as John Constantine
- Danielle Panabaker as Caitlin Snow
- Carlos Valdes as Cisco Ramon
- Peter Francis James as Aldus Boardman
- Casper Crump as Vandal Savage
- Ciara Renée as Kendra Saunders / Hawkgirl
- Falk Hentschel as Carter Hall / Hawkman
- Anna Hopkins as Samantha Clayton
- James Kidnie as Milo Armitage
- Lynda Boyd as Phaedra Nixon
- Rila Fukushima as Tatsu Yamashiro
- Venus Terzo as Elisa Schwartz
- Colton Haynes as Roy Harper / Arsenal
- Megalyn E.K. as Mari McCabe / Vixen
- Adrian Holmes as Frank Pike
- Amy Gumenick as Carrie Cutter / Cupid
- Emily Kinney as Brie Larvan / Bug-Eyed Bandit
- Alex Kingston as Dinah Lance
- Madison McLaughlin as Evelyn Sharp
- Vinnie Jones as Danny Brickwell / Brick
- Nolan Gerard Funk as Cooper Seldon

== Production ==
=== Development ===
In January 2015, The CW President Mark Pedowitz announced Arrow's renewal for a fourth season at the 2014 Television Critics Association event. Series creator Marc Guggenheim returned as showrunner, while co-executive producer and writer Wendy Mericle was promoted to co-showrunner.

=== Writing ===
The season introduces two major changes to the series: Starling City being renamed as Star City, and Oliver Queen returning to vigilantism as the "Green Arrow", the same vigilante identity he uses in the comics. Regarding the latter, speaking before the season premiere, Wendy Mericle said, "It felt right for the natural evolution of Oliver's character to become what we know in the comics". Teasing Damien Darhk, the season's big bad, series co-creator Andrew Kreisberg said, "We've always referred to Ra's al Ghul [Matt Nable] as the worst thing that can happen to Oliver and his team, but when you see the first two episodes of season four, you'll quickly realize that Ra's was in the nursery compared to what Damien's got in store for everybody". He called Darhk a "different" villain than the previous ones, saying "He's a bit more colorful, a bit more fun and is very dangerous and commanding and leads an army of followers who would die at his command. But he's funnier, more charming and fits in with our whole shading this year where we've made things lighter." The season also sees many of the characters taking on vigilante codenames: Spartan (John Diggle), Speedy (Thea Queen), and Overwatch (Felicity Smoak). Guggenheim originally hoped to bring Helena Bertinelli / Huntress (Jessica De Gouw) back after failing to include her last season, describing that the crew had a "kick-ass" idea for a Huntress episode.

=== Casting ===
Main cast members Stephen Amell, Katie Cassidy, David Ramsey, Willa Holland, Emily Bett Rickards, John Barrowman and Paul Blackthorne return from previous seasons as Oliver Queen, Laurel Lance / Black Canary, John Diggle / Spartan, Thea Queen / Speedy, Malcolm Merlyn, and Quentin Lance. This was initially Cassidy's final season as a regular, due to her character dying in the episode "Eleven-Fifty-Nine"; she would later return as a guest star in season 5, and be reinstated as a regular starting with season 6. Colton Haynes, who portrayed Roy Harper / Arsenal as a regular in seasons two and three, returned in a guest capacity. Neal McDonough recurs as Damien Darhk.

=== Design ===
The Green Arrow costume was designed by Maya Mani. It is more armored than the Arrow costume, eschews sleeves and features shoulder pads and archer's gauntlets, in addition to having many pockets and holsters. Diggle's Spartan costume consists of a steel gray jacket-and-pants combination along with a face-protecting helmet. In response to criticism of the Spartan helmet resembling that worn by the Marvel Comics character Magneto, Ramsey said, "I know there's a lot of criticism that it looks like the Magneto helmet. But by the time you see Diggle in action – we also get into what the helmet can do – you won't be thinking of the X-Men at all."

=== Filming ===
Filming for the season began in mid-July 2015 in Vancouver, British Columbia, Canada, and ended in late April 2016.

=== Arrowverse tie-ins ===
In May 2015, Amell revealed he had had discussions with DC Entertainment to portray Oliver Queen on Constantine because its title character, John Constantine is an expert on the Lazarus Pit, a concept used on Arrow. In August 2015, it was confirmed that Constantine star Matt Ryan would appear on Arrow in the fourth season episode "Haunted", per a "one-time-only" deal that would involve his character being "brought in to deal with the fallout of the resurrection of Sara Lance (Caity Lotz) via Ra's al Ghul's Lazarus Pit." As Arrow and Constantine were both produced by Warner Bros. Television, the producers of Arrow were able to acquire Ryan's original outfits. John Badham, who was a director on Constantine, directed "Haunted". On filming the episode, Guggenheim stated it felt like the production team was "doing a Constantine/Arrow crossover, and it's so exciting... we're just really glad we got the chance to extend Matt Ryan's run as Constantine by at least one more hour of television. I think you'll see he fits very neatly into our universe. It never feels forced, it feels right."

Season four includes the second annual crossover with The Flash: "Heroes Join Forces", which also serves as the setup for Legends of Tomorrow. The season also saw the live-action debut of Vixen with, Megalyn Echikunwoke reprising her role from the animated web series of the same name.

== Release ==
=== Broadcast ===
The season began airing in the United States on The CW on October 7, 2015, and completed its 23-episode run on May 25, 2016.

=== Home media ===
The season was released on DVD and Blu-ray on August 30, 2016, with special features including the second annual Arrowverse crossover event titled "Heroes Join Forces". It began streaming on Netflix on October 5, 2016.

== Reception ==
=== Critical response ===
The season premiere earned positive reviews, with Jesse Schedeen of IGN giving it 8.5, stating "Arrow is showing every sign of addressing the flaws that bogged down Season 3", and Morgan Jeffery of Digital Spy describing the series as being "back on form".

However, the response to the season as a whole was more critical. Whilst overall Alasdair Wilkins of The A.V. Club considered the season finale to be a "perfectly decent end to a perfectly decent season", and that season four addressed some of the weaknesses of previous seasons, in particular in terms of a strong villain presence in Neil McDonough he also noted that "This season was a step in the right direction, but a proper return to past glory still feels awfully far away." Entertainment Weekly's Jonathon Dornbush summarized the season as "one that at times hinted at the promise of the show's glory days but often was almost as at odds with itself as Oliver is with himself." Overall, he criticized the lack of focus in the flashbacks, a failure to build up Dahrk's plans and motivations consistently and the lack of hope in a season where Oliver was attempting to give hope to others.

Writing for TV Overmind, Andy Behbakht criticized the decision to kill off Laurel Lance, feeling the character was underutilized and "The Black Canary was in many ways one of Arrow's big hearts and seeing the show losing that character, makes the series lose a lot of its remaining magic". For the same website, Caroline Schlafly criticized the way Felicity was written throughout the season and felt that at times it gave her too much focus. However, overall she was pleased with the change in tone the season brought, and in particular praised the growth in Oliver's character, noting that, "Arrow is no longer a dark show about a vigilante who's willing to murder. It's about Oliver Queen and his teammates, and how they develop and interact as they fight crime and villains and Star City. Sure, right now the team is monopolized by Felicity – but hopefully that will change, and we'll still be left with these other fantastic changes." In his review of "Canary Cry", Eric Francisco of Inverse said, "Arrow is not a good TV show anymore [...] The centerpiece series that started the evolving, expansive DC TV universe has mutated into a horrid, audio/visual white noise", and was particularly critical of the portrayals of Oliver, Diggle, Thea and Felicity in the season, along with the handling of Laurel's death.

Reviewing the season as a whole for IGN, Jesse Schedeen noted that "The fourth season made some significant strides, but ultimately failed to address the show's fundamental problem ". He praised the addition of McDonough as Darhk, as well as guest appearances including Matt Ryan as Constantine which helped seat the show within a wider DC Universe. He noted how the season suffered at times in its first half from having to lay the groundwork for spin-off Legends of Tomorrow. Whilst he praised the work of directors Lexi Alexander and James Bamford, as well as actress Emily Bett Rickards and felt the first half of the season built well, overall he felt that the season was failed in the second half by a feeling that "the writers were merely spinning their wheels before ushering in the final battle against HIVE". He was particularly critical of the narrative structure of the flashback sequences and the way in which many of the season's major plot lines ended where "the payoff didn't do justice to the setup." Giving the season a 6.6, he concluded "Arrow's fourth season had plenty of great episodes but ultimately failed to come together as a satisfying whole."

Rotten Tomatoes gave the season an 85% approval rating based on 369 reviews, with an average rating of 7.55/10. The critical consensus reads: "Season four of Arrow flourishes with a refreshing new tone, a thrilling new villain, and a gripping story arc."

=== Ratings ===
The fourth season averaged 2.90 million viewers across the 23 episodes and ranked 145th among television show viewership.

Viewership and ratings per episode of Arrow season 4
No.	Title	Air date	Rating/share (18–49)	Viewers (millions)	DVR (18–49)	DVR viewers (millions)	Total (18–49)	Total viewers (millions)
1	"Green Arrow"	October 7, 2015	1.1/4	2.67	—N/a	1.43	—N/a	4.10
2	"The Candidate"	October 14, 2015	1.0/3	2.50	—N/a	1.34	—N/a	3.84
3	"Restoration"	October 21, 2015	0.9/3	2.40	0.6	1.36	1.5	3.77
4	"Beyond Redemption"	October 28, 2015	0.9/3	2.64	—N/a	—N/a	—N/a	—N/a
5	"Haunted"	November 4, 2015	1.1/4	2.60	—N/a	—N/a	—N/a	—N/a
6	"Lost Souls"	November 11, 2015	0.9/3	2.30	—N/a	1.22	—N/a	3.52
7	"Brotherhood"	November 18, 2015	1.1/4	2.69	—N/a	—N/a	—N/a	—N/a
8	"Legends of Yesterday"	December 2, 2015	1.4/4	3.66	0.7	1.61	2.1	5.27
9	"Dark Waters"	December 9, 2015	1.0/3	2.82	0.6	1.22	1.6	4.04
10	"Blood Debts"	January 20, 2016	1.1/3	2.83	0.7	1.47	1.8	4.30
11	"A.W.O.L."	January 27, 2016	1.1/4	2.78	0.6	1.24	1.7	4.01
12	"Unchained"	February 3, 2016	0.9/3	2.48	0.6	1.26	1.5	3.74
13	"Sins of the Father"	February 10, 2016	0.9/3	2.44	0.6	1.32	1.5	3.77
14	"Code of Silence"	February 17, 2016	0.9/3	2.44	0.7	1.40	1.6	3.85
15	"Taken"	February 24, 2016	1.0/3	2.70	—N/a	—N/a	—N/a	—N/a
16	"Broken Hearts"	March 23, 2016	0.7/3	2.09	0.6	1.33	1.3	3.41
17	"Beacon of Hope"	March 30, 2016	0.9/3	2.34	—N/a	—N/a	—N/a	—N/a
18	"Eleven-Fifty-Nine"	April 6, 2016	0.8/3	2.24	0.6	1.16	1.4	3.39
19	"Canary Cry"	April 27, 2016	0.9/3	2.27	—N/a	1.18	—N/a	3.45
20	"Genesis"	May 4, 2016	0.7/3	2.07	0.6	1.19	1.3	3.26
21	"Monument Point"	May 11, 2016	0.8/3	2.16	0.5	1.13	1.3	3.29
22	"Lost in the Flood"	May 18, 2016	0.7/2	1.94	0.6	1.23	1.3	3.20
23	"Schism"	May 25, 2016	0.8/3	2.19	0.6	1.12	1.4	3.31

=== Accolades ===
Arrow, season 4 award nominations
Year	Award	Category	Nominee(s)	Result	Ref.
2016	Leo Awards	Best Costume Design Dramatic Series	Maya Mani ("This Is Your Sword")	Won	
2016	Leo Awards	Best Costume Design Dramatic Series	Maya Mani ("Legends of Yesterday")	Nominated	
2016	Leo Awards	Best Direction Dramatic Series	James Bamford ("Brotherhood")	Nominated	
2016	Leo Awards	Best Stunt Coordination Dramatic Series	J. J. Makaro, James Bamford, Eli Zagoudakis, Curtis Braconnier ("Brotherhood")	Won	
2016	Leo Awards	Best Lead Performance by a Female Dramatic Series	Emily Bett Rickards ("A.W.O.L.")	Nominated	
2016	MTV Fandom Awards	Ship of the Year	Olicity (Stephen Amell and Emily Bett Rickards)	Won	
2016	People's Choice Awards	Favorite Network TV Sci-Fi/Fantasy	Arrow	Nominated	
2016	Saturn Awards	Best Superhero Adaptation Television Series	Arrow	Nominated	
2016	Teen Choice Awards	Choice Sci-Fi/Fantasy TV Actress	Emily Bett Rickards	Nominated	
2016	Teen Choice Awards	Choice Sci-Fi/Fantasy TV Show	Arrow	Nominated	
2016	Teen Choice Awards	Choice TV Liplock	Stephen Amell and Emily Bett Rickards	Nominated	
