= Heroes Join Forces =

Two-part crossover between the series Arrow and The Flash

- Arrowverse crossover event
- Promotional poster

Part 1: The Flash
- Episode title: "Legends of Today"
- Episode no.: Season 2 Episode 8
- Directed by: Ralph Hemecker
- Story by: Greg Berlanti; Andrew Kreisberg
- Teleplay by: Aaron Helbing; Todd Helbing
- Production code: 3J5658
- Original air date: December 1, 2015

Episode chronology
← Previous "Gorilla Warfare"	Next → "Running to Stand Still"
- The Flash season 2

Part 2: Arrow
- Episode title: "Legends of Yesterday"
- Episode no.: Season 4 Episode 8
- Directed by: Thor Freudenthal
- Story by: Greg Berlanti; Marc Guggenheim
- Teleplay by: Brian Ford Sullivan; Marc Guggenheim
- Production code: 3J5808
- Original air date: December 2, 2015

Episode chronology
← Previous "Brotherhood"	Next → "Dark Waters"
- Arrow season 4

Crossover chronology
- Preceded by: Flash vs. Arrow
- Followed by: Invasion!

"Heroes Join Forces" is the second Arrowverse crossover event that features episodes of the television series The Flash and Arrow on The CW. The event began on December 1, 2015, with The Flash episode "Legends of Today" and concluded the following day with the Arrow episode "Legends of Yesterday". The episodes feature characters from Legends of Tomorrow, which was being developed as a spin-off. The crossover sees Barry Allen / Flash and Oliver Queen / Arrow team up to take on Vandal Savage, who is looking for Kendra Saunders and Carter Hall, the reincarnations of Hawkgirl and Hawkman.

A crossover between the two series was announced in January 2015 by The CW President Mark Pedowitz, who stated the network's intention to have an Arrowverse crossover every season following the success of the previous year's crossover "Flash vs. Arrow". By September, the scripts for each episode had been written, with filming occurring shortly before the end of the month and into October 2015. The crossover sees every main cast member of each series who appear at least in their own series, with additional actors and characters also reprising their Arrowverse roles.

The episodes received generally positive reviews; however, the Legends setup received mixed responses. Both series experienced season high viewership despite the ratings being down from the previous year's crossover. A subsequent crossover occurred the following year, titled "Invasion!".

== Plot ==
Vandal Savage arrives in Central City looking to kill Kendra Saunders. After he attacks Kendra and Cisco Ramon, Barry Allen takes Kendra to Star City and enlists the help of Oliver Queen and his team to protect her. The team is visited by Malcolm Merlyn, who informs them that Savage is an immortal. Later, Kendra is kidnapped by a mysterious winged man, but Barry and Oliver rescue her and capture him. He introduces himself as Carter Hall, and tells them he and Kendra are soulmates who have been connected for millennia. They are destined to die, be reborn, and find each other in each lifetime. Carter also reveals that Savage has killed the pair in all of their previous lives, each time growing stronger, while Savage acquires the Staff of Horus, a deadly mystical weapon. Kendra unlocks her abilities, with Cisco naming her Hawkgirl, and the team decides to regroup in Central City. While there, Oliver witnesses his ex-girlfriend Samantha Clayton with her son William, and realizes the child is likely his. Meanwhile, Caitlin Snow and Harry Wells create a serum capable of temporarily increasing Barry's speed so that he can defeat Zoom. Jay Garrick initially refuses to test the serum, but is later forced to do so in order to save Wells' life when he is shot by Patty Spivot, who mistakes him for Eobard Thawne. Jay advises against using the serum on Barry.

Malcolm orchestrates a meeting between Savage, Barry, and Oliver. Savage demands they turn over Kendra and Carter, threatening to destroy both Central City and Star City with the Staff of Horus. Without Felicity Smoak's knowledge, Oliver has Barry perform a paternity test on a strand of William's hair, which confirms that he is William's father. Confronting Samantha, she agrees to let him see William on condition that he tell no one, including William himself, of the boy's parentage; Felicity learns of Oliver's paternity from Barry. Frustrated and feeling betrayed that Oliver is still willing to keep secrets from her, she ends their relationship.

Barry and Oliver devise a plan to deliver Kendra and Carter as a ruse to get close enough to Savage to destroy the staff. The plan goes horribly wrong; Kendra's powers fail and Savage quickly gains the upper hand, killing both her and Carter before using the staff to destroy Central City. Barry escapes and runs back in time to the point of the original negotiation. Barry informs Oliver of his time travel and the mistakes that led to their defeat. They change their approach to the plan and Barry is able to steal the staff. He and Oliver use it on Savage, turning him into ashes. Kendra and Carter decide to use their powers to help others in another city. Cisco gives Kendra a tracking device. Oliver agrees to Samantha's conditions for him to see William. Even though Barry encourages Oliver to tell Felicity about William, who she never learned about due to Barry's time traveling, he decides not to reveal the secret to her. Later Merlyn collects Savage's ashes while saying that Savage owes him.

== Cast and characters ==
=== Main and recurring ===
Main and recurring characters in "Heroes Join Forces"
Actor	Character	Episode	
Actor	Character	The Flash	Arrow
Grant Gustin	Barry Allen / Flash	Main	Guest
Candice Patton	Iris West	Main	
Danielle Panabaker	Caitlin Snow	Main	Guest
Carlos Valdes	Cisco Ramon	Main	Guest
Tom Cavanagh	Harrison "Harry" Wells	Main	
Jesse L. Martin	Joe West	Main	
Stephen Amell	Oliver Queen / Green Arrow	Guest	Main
John Barrowman	Malcolm Merlyn	Guest	Main
Emily Bett Rickards	Felicity Smoak	Guest	Main
Willa Holland	Thea Queen / Speedy	Guest	Main
David Ramsey	John Diggle	Guest	Main
Ciara Renée	Kendra Saunders / Hawkgirl	Guest	Guest
Casper Crump	Vandal Savage	Guest	Guest
Falk Hentschel	Carter Hall / Hawkman	Guest	Guest
Anna Hopkins	Samantha Clayton	Guest	Guest
Katie Cassidy	Laurel Lance / Black Canary		Main

- Note: Despite being credited, Keiynan Lonsdale does not appear in The Flash episode and Paul Blackthorne does not appear in the Arrow episode.

=== Guest ===
==== The Flash ====
- Neal McDonough as Damien Darhk
- Teddy Sears as Jay Garrick (Note: The episode "Versus Zoom" of the second season of The Flash revealed Sears' character to be Hunter Zolomon, the alter-ego of Zoom, who masqueraded as Jay Garrick.)
- Shantel VanSanten as Patty Spivot

==== Arrow ====
- Peter Francis James as Dr. Aldus Boardman

== Production ==
=== Development ===
In January 2015, The CW President Mark Pedowitz stated the network's intention to have an Arrowverse crossover every season, after the previous year's two-part event with the eighth episodes of the third season of Arrow and the first season of The Flash, titled "Flash vs. Arrow". In July 2015, Andrew Kreisberg, creator and executive producer on both series, confirmed that the eighth episodes of the fourth season of Arrow and the second season of The Flash would be a two-part crossover. The next month, Kreisberg revealed that the crossover would help lay the groundwork for the new team-up, spin-off series Legends of Tomorrow. Kreisberg said, "Both Arrow and Flash are helping to set those things up, in both big ways and small ways, which is lovely... There's going to be a lot happening leading up to the crossover, which is serving as a [sort-of] pilot for Legends."

Kreisberg described the crossover between both shows as "a superhero a-go-go!", saying: "It's insane to have them all together." Unlike the 2014 crossover, which was two separate self-contained adventures that involved each show, Marc Guggenheim, executive producer on Arrow, said: "This [year's] is a crazy, full-on 'To Be Continued' crossover,... it really feels like a 2-hour movie [airing] over two nights." Kreisberg and Guggenheim also reassured fans that both episodes would not focus solely on setting up the spin-off series, and that the crossover is still Oliver Queen and Barry Allen having their own adventure. "These [episodes] have important stuff going on for the narratives of both The Flash and Arrow," said Kriesberg, while Guggenheim added: "The final moments of The Flash have a pretty big jaw-dropper and we pick up those threads in Arrow. Then we do some things with the characters from Arrow... that are pretty epic and major."

In The Flash episode, Caitlin and Harry create a drug called Velocity 6 to make Barry faster against Zoom. Kreisberg commented that "It's safe to say that there'll be a few more iterations of that formula", but viewers will have to wait and see how everything plays out and the effects on those who use it. Teddy Sears (whose character Jay Garrick uses the drug, which temporarily restores his speed) said while his character is not fixated on restoring his speed, Velocity 6 presents an interesting fix that will tempt him due to his "haunting memories" of his previous life with powers.

=== Writing ===
In July 2015, Greg Berlanti, creator and executive producer on both series, said:

We've just been breaking into it over the last week or so actually ... so we're, really, excited about it. We've got a great story lined up for towards the end of the fall, early winter. This year our real hope is to make a crossover that's even bigger, and even more rewarding for the audience than the last years [sic].

The scripts for the "Heroes Join Forces" crossover were written in September 2015. Berlanti created the story for the event, and Kreisberg and Guggenheim helped to craft the story of The Flash and Arrow episodes, respectively. The teleplay for The Flash was written by showrunners Aaron and Todd Helbing; Arrow's was written by Brian Ford Sullivan and Guggenheim.

=== Filming ===
Filming of the two episodes occurred from September 25, 2015, until October 15, 2015. The Flash's episode was directed by Ralph Hemecker, and Arrow's by Thor Freudenthal. Berlanti discussed the logistic nightmare of bringing the three series together since the first couple of episodes of Legends of Tomorrow had already been shot before the filming of the crossover episodes. In addition, there were characters from The Flash and Arrow "that we were also shooting out of those respective shows before we went into shooting Legends to then have to come back and do the introduction of some of the characters here." Falk Hentschel described the filming as "an acting marathon" constantly moving from one set to another during the day, but had a blast.

== Release ==
=== Broadcast ===
The crossover episodes were scheduled to be shown at an exclusive fan screening hosted by AT&T on November 22, 2015, but it was cancelled to allow more time for the visual effects to be completed. The first part on The Flash aired on December 1, followed by part two on Arrow on December 2, both on The CW. The crossover was simulcast with the US broadcast in Canada on CTV.

=== Home media ===
The episodes were released together on Blu-ray and DVD, along with the rest of The Flash's second season on September 6, 2016, and Arrow's fourth season on August 30, 2016. Bonus features include behind-the-scenes featurettes, audio commentary, deleted scenes, and a blooper reel.

== Reception ==
=== Ratings ===
Viewership and ratings per episode of Heroes Join Forces
No.	Series	Air date	Rating/share (18–49)	Viewers (millions)	DVR (18–49)	DVR viewers (millions)	Total (18–49)	Total viewers (millions)
1	The Flash	December 1, 2015	1.4/5	3.94	0.9	2.12	2.3	6.07
2	Arrow	December 2, 2015	1.4/4	3.66	0.7	1.61	2.1	5.27

The Flash episode attracted season two's largest viewership – the show's largest since February 17, 2015. The episode attracted 12% more viewers and matched the 18–49 rating of the previous episode, "Gorilla Warfare". It was down 12% in the 18–49 rating from the previous year's crossover. The Arrow episode attracted season four's largest viewership and 18–49 rating, the best since the previous year's crossover with The Flash on December 3, 2014. Viewership improved by 36% and viewers in the 18-49 demographic increased by 27% over the previous episode, "Brotherhood".

The Canadian broadcast of The Flash was watched by 2.00 million viewers, earning it the highest viewership for that night, and the third highest for the week. The Arrow broadcast had 1.81 million viewers, the fourth highest for that day, and the seventh highest for the week.

=== Critical response ===
Alasdair Wilkins writing for The A.V. Club described the crossover as "one big 90-minute movie," and found it is only when the viewer is well into the broadcast that it becomes clear that there are two storylines from separate shows. Wilkins found "Legends Of Today" and "Legends Of Yesterday" charming feeling they "operate on a more epic scale" than either show's typical episode. Oliver's paternity storyline felt creaky to Wilkins, and he noted the episodes again strained "to set up the latest spin-off". Despite these faults, he found "the overall effect of this crossover two-parter ... pretty damn impressive," and the "team-up story ... grand enough to be more than the sum of its parts".

Screen Rant's Alice Walker also noted the annual Arrow and The Flash crossover suffered from trying to set up Legends. She felt it "too much to ask" from the busy storylines, criticizing the producers for "planting more seeds than they could reap". She felt the crossovers had ceased to be "a fun way to contrast the two shows," now that they had to set up a new world.

==== The Flash ====
The review aggregator website Rotten Tomatoes reported an 83% approval rating, based on 12 reviews for the episode. The website's critical consensus reads, "Although the plots aren't particularly inspired, the talented, enchanting casts of The Flash and Arrow make this crossover episode an undeniable joy to watch."

Jesse Schedeen of IGN gave The Flash episode a score 7.5 out of 10. He was critical of the episode's "wonky pacing and story progression" and given its "legitimate two-part storyline" was disappointed it was not more cohesive than the previous year's crossover. He felt the crossover "had a fairly rocky start" and wondered whether Arrow's characters were actually necessary to the storyline. Even so, Scheden said, "there was a lot of fun to be had in seeing both teams cross paths and grapple with an increasingly strange world of heroes and villains" and was looking forward to a focused conclusion. The A.V. Club's Scott Von Doviak awarded the episode an "A", saying: ""Legends Of Today" is a sterling example of how to do this crossover thing right." He noted that the episode wove ongoing storylines "into an expansive DC Universe adventure" calling it "the most purely enjoyable outing of the season so far".

Dave Trumbore of Collider gave The Flash episode 3 stars out of 5, saying: "Not only did "Legends of Today" – i.e. Hawkman and Hawkgirl – do a good job introducing most of the main players of Legends of Tomorrow, it also provided a solid setup for the new Arrow episode, "Legends of Yesterday"." He described the show as "big, adventurous fun" but had the same problem as he had with the previous year's crossover in that when it gave screen time to The Flash "it lost sight of its own identity". Entertainment Weekly's Jonathon Dornbush gave The Flash episode a positive review, stating, "While The Flash is burdened with part 1," setting up the showdown in part 2, "Legends of Today" has "its own big moments and plenty of laughs".

Giving the episode a 7.5 out of 10, Eric Walters of Paste stated, that "Unlike last year, "Legends of Today" did not feel like a Flash episode featuring Team Arrow." He expected the 2015 crossover would be bigger than previous years' noting: "It is, but it's also far from complete." He felt that "Legends of Today" was not so much a The Flash episode, but more like "the first half of something much larger". In the end, he wished "the show had embraced it fully". Den of Geek's Mike Cecchini gave the episode 3.5 stars out of 5, saying: "I'm really kind of amazed at just how much work "Legends of Today" gets done without just becoming a massive mess." He described it as "a proper two-parter this year" and concluded: "Amidst all the Legends of Tomorrow hooplah and the fun of getting the teams together, "Legends of Today" still manages to move the main Flash season 2 storyline forward in a couple of neat ways."

==== Arrow ====
Rotten Tomatoes reported an 88% approval rating, based on 17 reviews for the episode. The website's critical consensus reads, "This satisfying conclusion to the most ambitious crossover event yet delivers some thrilling surprises and teases out tantalizing possibilities for the wider Arrowverse."

Jesse Schedeen gave Arrow's episode an 8.7 out of 10, noting that the Flash episode was "saddled with the setup" while "Arrow gets to have fun with the payoff." He felt the pace and storyline issues in "Legends of Tomorrow," the Flash episode, were resolved satisfactorily. The inclusion of flashbacks and time travel gave it "a larger scope and an added sense of drama". As well, the Ollie subplot allowed Stephen Amell "to show a much different and more vulnerable side to his character". Alisdair Wilkins awarded the episode a B+ noting "how much better the show's entire dynamic is this season compared with last year". He added that "Legends Of Yesterday" shows Oliver's conflict between keeping his friends safe and recognizing he cannot be victorious without them.

Dave Trumbore felt the Arrow episode tied up the introduction of Hawkgirl and Hawkman and their nemesis Vandal Savage, and effectively set up the launch of The CW's mid-season, spin-off Legends of Tomorrow. He gave it 4 stars out of 5. He added that the crossover specials "do a fantastic job of pulling back the camera to reveal the wider world that their heroes and villains share". Jonathon Dornbush was impressed with Carlos Valdes' performance, saying: "While Oliver naturally takes center stage — and Stephen Amell steps up to the task, arguably giving his best performance on the show yet — the secret MVP of the hour is Carlos Valdes' Cisco, who also happens to steal The Flash's half of the crossover."

Mark Rozeman of Paste gave the Arrow episode an 8.8 out of 10, saying, the episode: "has the freedom to play around with its toys a bit more" compared to the "unavoidable amount of world building and backstory [that] ended up massively bogging down the crossover's first installment." He felt the crossover was fun and a "rollicking good time". Kain praised the shows' creative team for "making the special feel like a legitimate event, as opposed to just a half-assed stab at ratings gold". Mike Cecchini was pleased that the episode was not "another hour of fan service with little substance," and felt "Legends of Yesterday" was a "really good" Arrow/Oliver Queen episode. He praised Amell's performance and highlighted that: "The two teams really gelled nicely, and just as Barry and Ollie felt like real friends during the episode's dramatic moments, Flash and Green Arrow felt like natural teammates during the superheroic moments." He gave the episode 3.5 stars out of 5.

=== Accolades ===
Collider named the second annual The Flash and Arrow crossover one of the 10 biggest superhero moments of 2015, saying "the two-night crossover event was a great success, reaffirming the fun of the universe they've built and stoking the desire to see it continue to grow". Zap2it also named both "Legends of Today" and "Legends of Yesterday" as one of the best television episodes of 2015.
