= Green Arrow (Arrow episode) =

- Arrow episode
- Promotional image of the season four Green Arrow costume, introduced in this episode
- Episode no.: Season 4 Episode 1
- Directed by: Thor Freudenthal
- Story by: Greg Berlanti; Beth Schwartz
- Teleplay by: Marc Guggenheim; Wendy Mericle
- Cinematography by: Gordon Verheul
- Editing by: Thomas Wallerstein
- Production code: 3J5801
- Original air date: October 7, 2015
- Running time: 41 minutes

Guest appearances
- Neal McDonough as Damien Darhk (special appearance by); Grant Gustin as Barry Allen (special guest star); Audrey Marie Anderson as Lyla Michaels; Cynthia Addai-Robinson as Amanda Waller

Episode chronology
← Previous "My Name Is Oliver Queen"	Next → "The Candidate"
- Arrow season 4

"Green Arrow" is the premiere of the fourth season and seventieth overall episode, of the American television series Arrow, originally broadcast on The CW. Based on the DC Comics character Green Arrow, the series follows the story of billionaire vigilante Oliver Queen (Stephen Amell) who returns home after five years supposedly stranded on a Pacific island, featuring flashback sequences to his time away. The series is part of the Arrowverse franchise, alongside spin-off shows The Flash, Legends of Tomorrow, Supergirl, Batwoman and other associated media. At the start of the fourth season, the character is attempting to start a new life away from vigilantism in Ivy Town, alongside girlfriend Felicity Smoak (Emily Bett Rickards). The episode marks the first time that the vigilante persona of Oliver Queen is referred to by his comic book alias of "Green Arrow". It is also the first episode in the series to feature a flash forward sequence as well as the established flashback sequences. The episode was written by season four showrunners Marc Guggenheim and Wendy Mericle, developed from a story written by co-developer Greg Berlanti and co-producer Beth Schwartz and directed by Thor Freudenthal. It was first broadcast in the United States on October 7, 2015, on The CW.

The episode takes place several months after the finale of season three. When a new threat is revealed in the newly renamed Star City, in the form of season antagonist Damien Darhk (Neal McDonough) Oliver returns to aid the team, taking up the mantle of "Green Arrow". In flashback sequences he is recruited, against his will, by A.R.G.U.S. and forced to return to the island of Lian Yu. The episode ends with a flash forward six months into the future, with Oliver grieving at a newly laid grave. The episode marks the first appearance by McDonough as Darhk and stars Stephen Amell as Oliver Queen alongside Katie Cassidy as Laurel Lance, David Ramsey as John Diggle, Willa Holland as Thea Queen, Emily Bett Rickards as Felicity Smoak and Paul Blackthorne as Quentin Lance, with Grant Gustin guest starring as Barry Allen.

The episode was watched live by 2.67 million viewers, a slight fall from the previous season premiere. Critics had a generally positive response to the episode, with many considering it a potential 'return to form' for the series. McDonough's introduction in particular met with a favorable reception, as did the perceived change of tone. However, many critics expressed caution with regard to the series' ability to maintain that tone throughout the season, particularly in light of the graveside flash forward. The episode holds a critics' approval rating of 94% on review aggregator site Rotten Tomatoes.

== Plot ==
Still recovering from events in Hong Kong, Oliver has been in Coast City, acting as a vigilante. He is approached in a bar by head of A.R.G.U.S. Amanda Waller when he realizes that he has been drugged. He awakens to find himself on a plane, where he is given instructions to infiltrate a base on the island of Lian Yu before being thrown out of the plane. Landing on the island, he is held at gunpoint by a man in military uniform.

Five years later, Oliver and Felicity are shown to have been living a suburban life in Ivy Town for a time, until the arrival of Laurel Lance and Thea Queen asking for their help in combating an emerging threat in the newly named Star City. A terrorist group, known as 'Ghosts' and led by Damien Darhk are murdering the city leadership, including the District Attorney. The pair agree and once back in Star City aid the team in tracking the Ghosts, discovering that Darhk has apparent magical powers. Oliver reveals that Ra's told him that Darhk was the leader of an organization called H.I.V.E. Diggle recognizes the name as the organisation which hired Floyd Lawton to kill his brother, Andy, but keeps the information to himself. Meanwhile, Darhk performs a blood ritual in his hideout and is visited by an employee, who turns out to be Quentin Lance. After consideration, Oliver decides to stay in Star City and broadcasts an announcement to the city, calling himself the 'Green Arrow'.

Six months later, Oliver is seen standing in a cemetery by an unseen tombstone. When Barry Allen arrives, Oliver states that the death is not his responsibility, but gaining revenge for it is.

== Production ==
=== Development ===
Arrow was developed for television by Greg Berlanti, Andrew Kreisberg and Marc Guggenheim in 2012, and premiered on The CW in October of the same year. The series is loosely based on the DC Comics character Green Arrow, telling the story of Oliver Queen, a former-billionaire turned vigilante. The show would go on to be the progenitor of a franchise of television series and other associated media based around adaptations of a variety of DC Comics characters, set within a shared universe, collectively known as the 'Arrowverse'.

Arrow's season three finale ended on an optimistic note for Oliver Queen seeing him 'drive off into the sunset' with girlfriend Felicity Smoak. However, the season as a whole carried a darker tone, and was met with a mixed critical response. Ahead of the premiere, co-showrunner Marc Guggenheim discussed how season four would lead on from the season three finale, stating that Oliver would have "a new outlook on life", and that the series as a whole would be aiming to shift to a lighter tone. He also indicated that the writers intended to introduce season antagonist Damien Darhk early on in the season, confirming that this would be in episode one prior to the premiere.

=== Writing ===
In July 2015, Guggenheim revealed that the fourth season premiere would be titled "Green Arrow" and that he would be writing the episode alongside co-showrunner Wendy Mericle. The script was developed from a story written by Beth Schwartz and executive producer Greg Berlanti, with the episode directed by Thor Freudenthal.

The episode sees the fictional Starling City where the series is set renamed to match its comic counterpart, Star City. It is also the first episode to name series protagonist Oliver Queen by his comics moniker Green Arrow. Regarding this change, Wendy Mericle stated that, "it felt right for the natural evolution of Oliver's character to become what we know in the comics". Discussing the flash forward grave-side scene after the show aired, Mericle explained that the producers "want[ed] to bring stakes back to the show" confirming that the intention was for the character in the grave to remain dead.

=== Casting ===
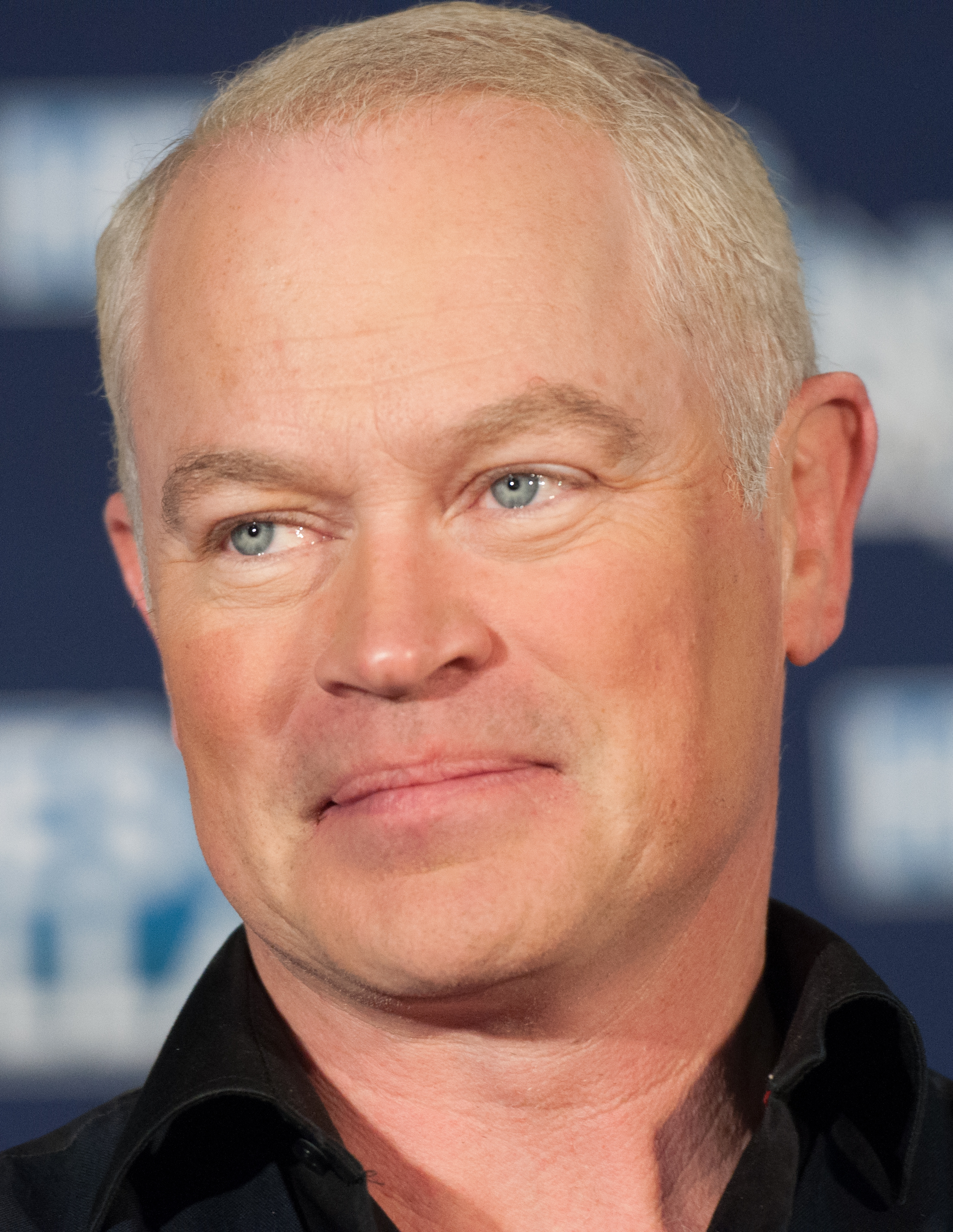
Actor Neil McDonough who plays Damien Dhark, introduced in this episode

The episode stars the main cast of Arrow's fourth season; Stephen Amell as Oliver Queen, Katie Cassidy as Laurel Lance, David Ramsey as John Diggle, Willa Holland as Thea Queen, Emily Bett Rickards as Felicity Smoak and Paul Blackthorne as Quentin Lance. Season antagonist Damien Darhk is introduced in the episode, with Neil McDonough cast in the role in July 2015. The episode sees the return of Cynthia Addai-Robinson as A.R.G.U.S. chief Amanda Waller in a guest role and Audrey Marie Anderson as Lyla Michaels, an A.R.G.U.S. agent married to John Diggle, in a recurring capacity. Grant Gustin also features in a guest role, as Barry Allen, the lead character on spin-off show The Flash. John Barrowman, who portrays Malcolm Merlyn, is credited in the opening credits of the episode, but does not feature.

=== Filming ===
The episode was filmed between July 13 and July 23, 2015, in Vancouver, British Columbia, Canada.

== Reception ==
=== Ratings ===
The episode was watched live by 2.67 million viewers with a 1.1/4 share among adults aged 18 to 49, a slight decrease from the previous season premiere. It was watched by a further 1.43 million viewers in Live+7 viewing.

=== Critical reception ===
On review aggregator website Rotten Tomatoes, the episode holds an approval rating of 94% based on 18 reviews, with an average rating of 7.9/10. The critics' consensus reads "Arrow returns with aplomb, promising that the series can deftly navigate a more aspirational tonal shift and the introduction of more fantastical elements."

Jesse Schedeen of IGN gave the episode a "great" 8.5 out of 10 and welcomed the promise of the season's premiere, stating that "Arrow is showing every sign of addressing the flaws that bogged down Season 3." He particularly welcomed both the introduction of McDonough's Damien Dhark, and the lighter tone of Oliver Queen's character. Whilst he praised David Ramsey's performance in portraying the fractured nature of the relationship between John Diggle and Oliver, and the rapport between Stephen Amell and Emily Bett Rickards as Oliver and Felicity Smoak respectively, Scheeden felt that the characters of Laurel Lance (Katie Cassidy) and Thea Queen (Willa Holland) "failed to impress" in the season premiere. Overall, he felt that the episode laid solid groundwork for the rest of the season.

Green Arrow provides a thrilling dive back into the Arrow world. Between an exciting new villain and a whole new batch of mysteries, the season already looks to be on a positive trajectory. Here's hoping, unlike Oliver's arrows, it doesn't get stuck and fall midway through.

— Critic Mark Rozeman reviewing the episode for Paste

The A.V. Club's Alasdair Wilkins gave the episode a "B+" grade and called it "an exciting opening for this season of Arrow". He also welcomed the introduction of McDonough and felt the season premiere delivered a promise that the series was "ready to live up to the entire Green Arrow legacy" calling the episode "a promising opening statement". Writing for Paste, Mark Rozeman also praised McDonough's introduction, stating he "bleeds menace and charisma" and that he was "just the shot in the arm the series needs after last season" feeling overall that the premiere set the season on a "positive trajectory". Kevin Yeoman, in his review for Screen Rant, praised not only Dahrk's introduction, but the manner in which he is introduced, highlighting how "allowing the opposing characters to interact propels the hour in a way that might have been lost had their threads not intertwined." Overall, he called the episode "confident and fast-paced", feeling it was "a return to form". Writing for TV Overmind, Andy Behbakht described the series as returning "with the type of great quality that fans originally fell in love". He welcomed the change in Oliver's character, as well as the potential of the flashbacks and of Dahrk, and in particular the introduction of the "Green Arrow" moniker to the series.

Carissa Pavlica of TV Fanatic described the episode as a "satisfying return" following a disappointing season three and gave it a rating of 4.0 out of 5.0. She welcomed Oliver returning as a member of the team as opposed to its leader. However she expressed skepticism at the promised lighter tone of the season, particularly with the shadow of a character death, and of Oliver's declaration of deadly revenge, looming over it. Noel Kirkpatrick of TV.com welcomed the promise of the first episode, although was similarly cautious regarding the forecasted death, and the implications for the tone of the season. He praised the interplay between Amell and Rickards in "couple mode", but expressed some concerns over the development of the relationship, questioning if the show was "coasting on the chemistry of its couple". Writing for Uproxx, Alan Sepinwall described attempts to introduce a lighter tone to the series as "superficial at best", and that the episode had a mix of both interesting and frustrating moments. Writing for Collider, Dave Trumbore welcomed Dahrk, but felt that tension between the characters was "treading over old ground" and that the flash-forward scene as a narrative device was a disappointing way to try and create tension. Mike Cecchini, for Den of Geek, described the episode as "tough to get a read on". Whilst he considered it "funniest episode of Arrow I can remember" and again welcomed McDonough's Dahrk, he expressed concern that set up for the season, with an antagonist set on bringing down the city with an army of henchmen, felt "a little rote by now".
