= Elysia Rotaru =

Canadian actress (born 1984)

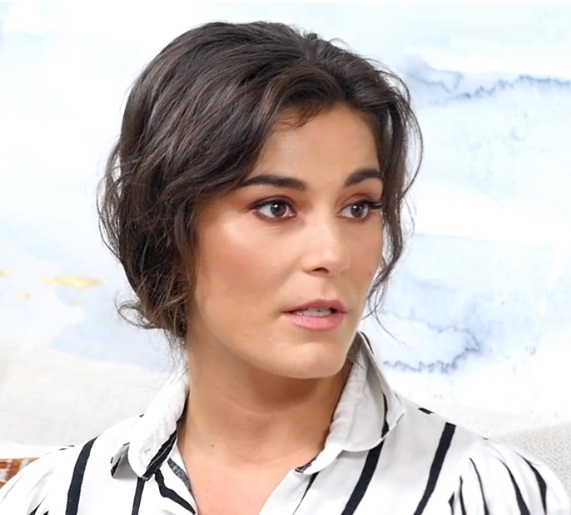
- Rotaru in 2018
- Born: Crystal Elysia Lorraine Rotaru; November 9, 1984 (age 41); Vancouver, British Columbia, Canada
- Occupations: Actress, voice artist
- Years active: 2006–present
- Children: 1

Elysia Rotaru (born November 9, 1984) is a Canadian actress known for playing Taiana Venediktov in Arrow.

== Biography ==
Rotaru was born in Vancouver to Romanian parents and is fluently bilingual in English and Romanian. From a young age, she took dance classes and was involved in school plays as well as piano recitals. She enrolled at Simon Fraser University for a career in psychology, but in the middle of the program she changed to theatre, earning a degree in Fine Arts with a specialty in theatre. She also studied traditional Chinese medicine.

=== Career ===
Rotaru debuted in 2008 as a guest star on an episode of the USA Network series, Psych, this was followed by appearances in television series such as Eureka of SyFy and Smallville and Supernatural on The CW. In 2010, Rotaru was given a recurring role in Hellcats, where she played Betsy. She also starred in the film Diary of a Wimpy Kid: Rodrick Rules where she played Ingrid, a main character in the fictional horror film The Foot.

In 2015, she appeared as a guest star on Motive, a television series broadcast on ABC and on the CW's iZombie. She temporarily voiced Sabine Wren on Disney XD's Lego Star Wars: Droid Tales. On August 10, 2015, Rotaru was cast in the TV show Arrow as Taiana Venediktov, a love interest to Oliver Queen.

== Filmography ==
=== Film ===
Year	Title	Role	Notes
2008	Annoying Orange: Turducken	Assassin / Sexy Chick #1	Short
2009	Deadweight	Kim	Short
2009	Stan Helsing	Hot Girl #1	
2010	Crooked	Pamela	Short
2011	Diary of a Wimpy Kid: Rodrick Rules	Ingrid	
2013	Amp	Zoey	Short
2014	Girl House	Heather	
2014	Earthlickers	Goddess O	Short
2015	The Wall	Brittany	Short
2015	Run	Sophie	Short
2015	Broken Masters	Lara Croft	Short
2016	Countdown	A.D.A.	
2017	Dead Again in Tombstone	Alicia	
2019	Cold Pursuit	Diner Waitress	
2019	Killbird	Taylor	
2021	Justice Society: World War II	Black Canary	Voice, direct-to-video
2024	Justice League: Crisis on Infinite Earths	Black Canary	Voice, direct-to-video

=== Television ===
Year	Title	Role	Notes
2008	Psych	Lantern Lady	Episode: "Ghosts"
2008	Eureka	Teri Wallace	Episode: "What About Bob?"
2008, 2010	Smallville	Female Inn Guest / Elizabeth Bishop	2 episodes
2010-2011	Hellcats	Betsy	3 episodes
2011	Sanctuary	French Woman	Episode: "Carentan"
2012	Fringe	Paige Randall	Episode: "Everything in Its Right Place"
2012, 2014	Supernatural	Shaylene Johnson / Victoria Dodd	2 episodes
2012	Finding Mrs. Claus	Emily	Television film
2013	Mr. Young	Reporter	Episode: "Mr. Sasquawk"
2013	King & Maxwell	Kelly	Episode: "Second Chances"
2014	Rush	Tina	Episode: "Learning to Fly"
2015	Backstrom	Melinda Norburg	Episode: "Bella"
2015	iZombie	Tess	Episode: "Pilot"
2015-2016	Arrow	Taiana Venediktov	Recurring; season 4-5, 19 episodes
2015	Motive	Pam Hexton	Episode: "Reversal of Fortune"
2015	Lego Star Wars: Droid Tales	Sabine Wren	Voice, episode: "Mission to Mos Eisley"
2016	Reapers	Morana	Miniseries
2016	Travelers	Irene Ingram	Episode: "Ave Machina"
2017	My Little Pony: Friendship Is Magic	Sable Spirit	Voice, episode: "Campfire Tales"
2018	Nina's World	Ms. Bianco	Voice, episode: "Sky High Mystery"
2018	Corner Gas Animated	60's Girl, Hipster	Voice, episode: "A Scary Cat Graffiti"
2019	Marvel Super Hero Adventures	She-Hulk	Voice, episode: "From Hulk to Eternity"
2021	Turner & Hooch	Krista St. Jean	1 episode
2021	A Snowy Christmas	Kelly Mitchum	Television film

=== Video games ===
Year	Title	Role	Notes	Source
2017	Mass Effect: Andromeda	Various	Performance Capture Actor	
2017	Lone Echo	Hera	Voice acting	
2017	Madden NFL 18: Longshot	Various	Motion capture actor	
2017	FIFA 18	Beatriz Villanova	Voice acting	
2017	Puzzle Fighter	Additional Voices		
2017	Need for Speed Payback	Curator		
2018	Dragalia Lost	Corsaint Phoenix / Kristy	Voice acting	
2018	FIFA 19	Beatriz Villanova	Voice acting	
2019	Crackdown 3	Agents		
2019	Anthem	Princess Zhim	Voice acting	
2019	FIFA 20	Beatriz Villanova	Voice acting	
2020	Legends of Runeterra	Lunari Priestess / Arrel the Tracker / Various	Voice acting	
2020	Avengers	Alisande Morales, Helen Gable, AIM Security	Voice acting	
2021	Cookie Run: Kingdom	Beet Cookie	Voice acting	
2022	Elder Scrolls Online	Ember	Voice acting	
2024	Homeworld 3	Imogen S'jet	Voice acting	
2025	Avowed	Chandler Weadan / The Watcher	Voice acting	
2025	Marvel Cosmic Invasion	She-Hulk, Lady Hellbender, Sif	Voice acting	

=== Web ===
Year	Title	Role	Notes
2011	Mortal Kombat: Legacy	Production Assistant	Episode: "Johnny Cage"
2012	Choose Your Victim	Harper Hill	7 episodes
