= List of The Flash episodes =

The Flash is an American action television series developed by Greg Berlanti, Andrew Kreisberg, and Geoff Johns, airing on The CW. It is based on the DC Comics character Barry Allen / Flash, a costumed crimefighter with the power to move at superhuman speeds. It is a spin-off from Arrow, existing in the same fictional universe. The series follows Barry Allen, portrayed by Grant Gustin, a crime scene forensic investigator who gains superhuman speed, which he uses to fight criminals, including others who have also gained superhuman abilities.

During the course of the series, 184 episodes of The Flash aired over nine seasons, between October 7, 2014, and May 24, 2023.

It is also the second longest, live-action superhero show after Smallville and the third overall on the CW/WB.

== Series overview ==
The Flash series overview
Season	Episodes	Originally released		Rank	Average viewership (in millions)
Season	Episodes	First released	Last released	Rank	Average viewership (in millions)
1	23	October 7, 2014	May 19, 2015	118	4.62
2	23	October 6, 2015	May 24, 2016	112	4.25
3	23	October 4, 2016	May 23, 2017	120	3.50
4	23	October 10, 2017	May 22, 2018	151	3.04
5	22	October 9, 2018	May 14, 2019	153	2.43
6	19	October 8, 2019	May 12, 2020	113	2.23
7	18	March 2, 2021	July 20, 2021	132	1.58
8	20	November 16, 2021	June 29, 2022	122	1.04
9	13	February 8, 2023	May 24, 2023	114	0.86

== Episodes ==
=== Season 1 (2014–15) ===
The Flash season 1 episodes
No. overall	No. in season	Title	Directed by	Written by	Original release date	Prod. code	U.S. viewers (millions)
1	1	"Pilot"	David Nutter	Story by : Greg Berlanti & Andrew Kreisberg & Geoff Johns; Teleplay by : Andrew Kreisberg & Geoff Johns	October 7, 2014	296848	4.83
2	2	"Fastest Man Alive"	David Nutter	Story by : Greg Berlanti & Andrew Kreisberg; Teleplay by : Andrew Kreisberg & Geoff Johns	October 14, 2014	3J5352	4.27
3	3	"Things You Can't Outrun"	Jesse Warn	Alison Schapker & Grainne Godfree	October 21, 2014	3J5353	3.59
4	4	"Going Rogue"	Glen Winter	Geoff Johns & Kai Yu Wu	October 28, 2014	3J5354	3.53
5	5	"Plastique"	Dermott Downs	Aaron Helbing & Todd Helbing & Brooke Eikmeier	November 11, 2014	3J5355	3.46
6	6	"The Flash Is Born"	Millicent Shelton	Jaime Paglia & Chris Rafferty	November 18, 2014	3J5356	3.73
7	7	"Power Outage"	Larry Shaw	Alison Schapker & Grainne Godfree	November 25, 2014	3J5357	3.47
8	8	"Flash vs. Arrow"	Glen Winter	Story by : Greg Berlanti & Andrew Kreisberg; Teleplay by : Ben Sokolowski & Brooke Eikmeier	December 2, 2014	3J5358	4.34
9	9	"The Man in the Yellow Suit"	Ralph Hemecker	Todd Helbing & Aaron Helbing	December 9, 2014	3J5359	4.66
10	10	"Revenge of the Rogues"	Nick Copus	Kai Yu Wu & Geoff Johns	January 20, 2015	3J5360	3.87
11	11	"The Sound and the Fury"	John F. Showalter	Alison Schapker & Brooke Eikmeier	January 27, 2015	3J5361	4.08
12	12	"Crazy for You"	Rob Hardy	Aaron Helbing & Todd Helbing	February 3, 2015	3J5362	3.60
13	13	"The Nuclear Man"	Glen Winter	Andrew Kreisberg & Katherine Walczak	February 10, 2015	3J5363	3.66
14	14	"Fallout"	Steve Surjik	Keto Shimizu & Ben Sokolowski	February 17, 2015	3J5364	4.01
15	15	"Out of Time"	Thor Freudenthal	Todd Helbing & Aaron Helbing	March 17, 2015	3J5365	3.69
16	16	"Rogue Time"	John Behring	Story by : Grainne Godfree; Teleplay by : Brooke Eikmeier & Kai Yu Wu	March 24, 2015	3J5366	3.33
17	17	"Tricksters"	Ralph Hemecker	Andrew Kreisberg	March 31, 2015	3J5367	3.67
18	18	"All Star Team Up"	Kevin Tancharoen	Grainne Godfree & Kai Yu Wu	April 14, 2015	3J5368	3.67
19	19	"Who Is Harrison Wells?"	Wendey Stanzler	Ray Utarnachitt & Cortney Norris	April 21, 2015	3J5369	3.75
20	20	"The Trap"	Steve Shill	Alison Schapker & Brooke Eikmeier	April 28, 2015	3J5370	3.93
21	21	"Grodd Lives"	Dermott Downs	Grainne Godfree & Kai Yu Wu	May 5, 2015	3J5371	3.62
22	22	"Rogue Air"	Doug Aarniokoski	Aaron Helbing & Todd Helbing	May 12, 2015	3J5372	3.65
23	23	"Fast Enough"	Dermott Downs	Story by : Greg Berlanti & Andrew Kreisberg; Teleplay by : Gabrielle Stanton & Andrew Kreisberg	May 19, 2015	3J5373	3.87

=== Season 2 (2015–16) ===
The Flash season 2 episodes
No. overall	No. in season	Title	Directed by	Written by	Original release date	Prod. code	U.S. viewers (millions)
24	1	"The Man Who Saved Central City"	Ralph Hemecker	Story by : Greg Berlanti & Andrew Kreisberg; Teleplay by : Andrew Kreisberg & Gabrielle Stanton	October 6, 2015	3J5651	3.58
25	2	"Flash of Two Worlds"	Jesse Warn	Aaron Helbing & Todd Helbing	October 13, 2015	3J5652	3.49
26	3	"Family of Rogues"	John F. Showalter	Julian Meiojas & Katherine Walczak	October 20, 2015	3J5653	3.47
27	4	"The Fury of Firestorm"	Stefan Pleszczynski	Kai Yu Wu & Joe Peracchio	October 27, 2015	3J5654	3.43
28	5	"The Darkness and the Light"	Steve Shill	Ben Sokolowski & Grainne Godfree	November 3, 2015	3J5655	3.87
29	6	"Enter Zoom"	JJ Makaro	Gabrielle Stanton & Brooke Eikmeier	November 10, 2015	3J5656	3.63
30	7	"Gorilla Warfare"	Dermott Downs	Aaron Helbing & Todd Helbing	November 17, 2015	3J5657	3.46
31	8	"Legends of Today"	Ralph Hemecker	Story by : Greg Berlanti & Andrew Kreisberg; Teleplay by : Aaron Helbing & Todd Helbing	December 1, 2015	3J5658	3.94
32	9	"Running to Stand Still"	Kevin Tancharoen	Andrew Kreisberg	December 8, 2015	3J5659	3.55
33	10	"Potential Energy"	Rob Hardy	Bryan Q. Miller	January 19, 2016	3J5660	3.41
34	11	"The Reverse-Flash Returns"	Michael A. Allowitz	Aaron Helbing & Todd Helbing	January 26, 2016	3J5661	3.71
35	12	"Fast Lane"	Rachel Talalay	Story by : Brooke Eikmeier; Teleplay by : Kai Yu Wu & Joe Peracchio	February 2, 2016	3J5662	3.66
36	13	"Welcome to Earth-2"	Millicent Shelton	Story by : Greg Berlanti & Andrew Kreisberg; Teleplay by : Katherine Walczak	February 9, 2016	3J5663	3.96
37	14	"Escape from Earth-2"	JJ Makaro	Story by : Todd Helbing & Aaron Helbing; Teleplay by : David Kob	February 16, 2016	3J5664	3.90
38	15	"King Shark"	Hanelle Culpepper	Benjamin Raab & Deric A. Hughes	February 23, 2016	3J5665	3.80
39	16	"Trajectory"	Glen Winter	Lauren Certo & Lilah Vandenburgh	March 22, 2016	3J5666	3.00
40	17	"Flash Back"	Alice Troughton	Aaron Helbing & Todd Helbing	March 29, 2016	3J5667	3.39
41	18	"Versus Zoom"	Stefan Pleszczynski	Joe Peracchio & David Kob	April 19, 2016	3J5668	3.03
42	19	"Back to Normal"	John F. Showalter	Brooke Roberts & Katherine Walczak	April 26, 2016	3J5669	3.39
43	20	"Rupture"	Armen V. Kevorkian	Kai Yu Wu & Lauren Certo	May 3, 2016	3J5670	3.34
44	21	"The Runaway Dinosaur"	Kevin Smith	Zack Stentz	May 10, 2016	3J5671	3.52
45	22	"Invincible"	Jesse Warn	Story by : Greg Berlanti & Andrew Kreisberg; Teleplay by : Brooke Roberts & David Kob	May 17, 2016	3J5672	3.37
46	23	"The Race of His Life"	Antonio Negret	Aaron Helbing & Todd Helbing	May 24, 2016	3J5673	3.35

=== Season 3 (2016–17) ===
The Flash season 3 episodes
No. overall	No. in season	Title	Directed by	Written by	Original release date	Prod. code	U.S. viewers (millions)
47	1	"Flashpoint"	Jesse Warn	Story by : Greg Berlanti & Andrew Kreisberg; Teleplay by : Andrew Kreisberg & Brooke Roberts	October 4, 2016	T27.13101	3.17
48	2	"Paradox"	Ralph Hemecker	Aaron Helbing & Todd Helbing	October 11, 2016	T27.13102	2.80
49	3	"Magenta"	Armen V. Kevorkian	Judalina Neira & David Kob	October 18, 2016	T27.13103	2.67
50	4	"The New Rogues"	Stefan Pleszczynski	Benjamin Raab & Deric A. Hughes	October 25, 2016	T27.13104	2.80
51	5	"Monster"	C. Kim Miles	Zack Stentz	November 1, 2016	T27.13105	2.77
52	6	"Shade"	JJ Makaro	Emily Silver & David Kob	November 15, 2016	T27.13106	3.01
53	7	"Killer Frost"	Kevin Smith	Story by : Judalina Neira; Teleplay by : Andrew Kreisberg & Brooke Roberts	November 22, 2016	T27.13107	2.95
54	8	"Invasion!"	Dermott Downs	Story by : Greg Berlanti & Andrew Kreisberg; Teleplay by : Aaron Helbing & Todd Helbing	November 29, 2016	T27.13108	4.15
55	9	"The Present"	Rachel Talalay	Story by : Aaron Helbing & Todd Helbing; Teleplay by : Lauren Certo	December 6, 2016	T27.13109	3.14
56	10	"Borrowing Problems from the Future"	Millicent Shelton	Grainne Godfree & David Kob	January 24, 2017	T27.13110	2.72
57	11	"Dead or Alive"	Harry Jierjian	Story by : Benjamin Raab & Deric A. Hughes; Teleplay by : Zack Stentz	January 31, 2017	T27.13111	3.06
58	12	"Untouchable"	Rob Hardy	Brooke Roberts & Judalina Neira	February 7, 2017	T27.13112	2.91
59	13	"Attack on Gorilla City"	Dermott Daniel Downs	Story by : Andrew Kreisberg; Teleplay by : Aaron Helbing & David Kob	February 21, 2017	T27.13113	2.78
60	14	"Attack on Central City"	Dermott Daniel Downs	Story by : Todd Helbing; Teleplay by : Benjamin Raab & Deric A. Hughes	February 28, 2017	T27.13114	2.87
61	15	"The Wrath of Savitar"	Alexandra La Roche	Andrew Kreisberg & Andrew Wilder	March 7, 2017	T27.13115	2.52
62	16	"Into the Speed Force"	Gregory Smith	Brooke Roberts & Judalina Neira	March 14, 2017	T27.13116	2.39
63	17	"Duet"	Dermott Daniel Downs	Story by : Greg Berlanti & Andrew Kreisberg; Teleplay by : Aaron Helbing & Todd Helbing	March 21, 2017	T27.13117	2.71
64	18	"Abra Kadabra"	Nina Lopez-Corrado	Story by : Andrew Kreisberg; Teleplay by : Brooke Roberts & David Kob	March 28, 2017	T27.13118	2.39
65	19	"The Once and Future Flash"	Tom Cavanagh	Carina Adly MacKenzie	April 25, 2017	T27.13119	2.67
66	20	"I Know Who You Are"	Hanelle Culpepper	Bronwen Clark & Joshua V. Gilbert	May 2, 2017	T27.13120	2.69
67	21	"Cause and Effect"	David McWhirter	Judalina Neira & Lauren Certo	May 9, 2017	T27.13121	2.71
68	22	"Infantino Street"	Michael Allowitz	Story by : Andrew Kreisberg; Teleplay by : Grainne Godfree	May 16, 2017	T27.13122	2.48
69	23	"Finish Line"	David McWhirter	Aaron Helbing & Todd Helbing	May 23, 2017	T27.13123	3.04

=== Season 4 (2017–18) ===
The Flash season 4 episodes
No. overall	No. in season	Title	Directed by	Written by	Original release date	Prod. code	U.S. viewers (millions)
70	1	"The Flash Reborn"	Glen Winter	Story by : Andrew Kreisberg; Teleplay by : Todd Helbing & Eric Wallace	October 10, 2017	T27.13401	2.84
71	2	"Mixed Signals"	Alexandra La Roche	Jonathan Butler & Gabriel Garza	October 17, 2017	T27.13402	2.54
72	3	"Luck Be a Lady"	Armen V. Kevorkian	Sam Chalsen & Judalina Neira	October 24, 2017	T27.13403	2.62
73	4	"Elongated Journey Into Night"	Tom Cavanagh	Sterling Gates & Thomas Pound	October 31, 2017	T27.13404	1.99
74	5	"Girls Night Out"	Laura Belsey	Lauren Certo & Kristen Kim	November 7, 2017	T27.13405	2.38
75	6	"When Harry Met Harry..."	Brent Crowell	Jonathan Butler & Gabriel Garza	November 14, 2017	T27.13406	2.46
76	7	"Therefore I Am"	David McWhirter	Eric Wallace & Thomas Pound	November 21, 2017	T27.13407	2.20
77	8	"Crisis on Earth-X, Part 3"	Dermott Downs	Story by : Andrew Kreisberg & Marc Guggenheim; Teleplay by : Todd Helbing	November 28, 2017	T27.13408	2.82
78	9	"Don't Run"	Stefan Pleszczynski	Sam Chalsen & Judalina Neira	December 5, 2017	T27.13409	2.22
79	10	"The Trial of the Flash"	Philip Chipera	Lauren Certo & Kristen Kim	January 16, 2018	T27.13410	2.51
80	11	"The Elongated Knight Rises"	Alexandra La Roche	Sterling Gates & Thomas Pound	January 23, 2018	T27.13411	2.12
81	12	"Honey, I Shrunk Team Flash"	Chris Peppe	Sam Chalsen & Judalina Neira	January 30, 2018	T27.13412	2.60
82	13	"True Colors"	Tara Nicole Weyr	Jonathan Butler & Gabriel Garza	February 6, 2018	T27.13413	2.28
83	14	"Subject 9"	Ralph Hemecker	Mike Alber & Gabe Snyder	February 27, 2018	T27.13414	2.12
84	15	"Enter Flashtime"	Gregory Smith	Todd Helbing & Sterling Gates	March 6, 2018	T27.13415	2.04
85	16	"Run, Iris, Run"	Harry Jierjian	Eric Wallace	March 13, 2018	T27.13416	2.09
86	17	"Null and Annoyed"	Kevin Smith	Lauren Certo & Kristen Kim	April 10, 2018	T27.13417	1.82
87	18	"Lose Yourself"	Hanelle Culpepper	Jonathan Butler & Gabriel Garza	April 17, 2018	T27.13418	1.88
88	19	"Fury Rogue"	Rachel Talalay	Joshua V. Gilbert & Jeff Hersh	April 24, 2018	T27.13419	1.90
89	20	"Therefore She Is"	Rob J. Greenlea	Sterling Gates & Thomas Pound	May 1, 2018	T27.13420	1.70
90	21	"Harry and the Harrisons"	Kevin Mock	Judalina Neira & Lauren Certo	May 8, 2018	T27.13421	1.74
91	22	"Think Fast"	Viet Nguyen	Sam Chalsen & Kristen Kim	May 15, 2018	T27.13422	1.93
92	23	"We Are the Flash"	David McWhirter	Todd Helbing & Eric Wallace	May 22, 2018	T27.13423	2.16

=== Season 5 (2018–19) ===
The Flash season 5 episodes
No. overall	No. in season	Title	Directed by	Written by	Original release date	Prod. code	U.S. viewers (millions)
93	1	"Nora"	David McWhirter	Todd Helbing & Sam Chalsen	October 9, 2018	T27.13751	2.08
94	2	"Blocked"	C. Kim Miles	Eric Wallace & Judalina Neira	October 16, 2018	T27.13752	1.69
95	3	"The Death of Vibe"	Andi Armaganian	Jonathan Butler & Gabriel Garza	October 23, 2018	T27.13753	1.87
96	4	"News Flash"	Brent Crowell	Kelly Wheeler & Lauren Certo	October 30, 2018	T27.13754	1.75
97	5	"All Doll'd Up"	Philip Chipera	Thomas Pound & Sterling Gates	November 13, 2018	T27.13755	1.73
98	6	"The Icicle Cometh"	Chris Peppe	Kristen Kim & Joshua V. Gilbert	November 20, 2018	T27.13756	1.60
99	7	"O Come, All Ye Thankful"	Sarah Boyd	Jonathan Butler & Gabriel Garza	November 27, 2018	T27.13757	1.79
100	8	"What's Past Is Prologue"	Tom Cavanagh	Todd Helbing & Lauren Certo	December 4, 2018	T27.13758	1.78
101	9	"Elseworlds, Part 1"	Kevin Tancharoen	Eric Wallace & Sam Chalsen	December 9, 2018	T27.13759	1.83
102	10	"The Flash & the Furious"	David McWhirter	Kelly Wheeler & Sterling Gates	January 15, 2019	T27.13760	1.64
103	11	"Seeing Red"	Marcus Stokes	Judalina Neira & Thomas Pound	January 22, 2019	T27.13761	1.88
104	12	"Memorabilia"	Rebecca Johnson	Sam Chalsen & Kristen Kim	January 29, 2019	T27.13762	2.04
105	13	"Goldfaced"	Alexandra LaRoche	Jonathan Butler & Gabriel Garza	February 5, 2019	T27.13763	1.89
106	14	"Cause and XS"	Rachel Talalay	Todd Helbing & Jeff Hersh	February 12, 2019	T27.13764	1.71
107	15	"King Shark vs. Gorilla Grodd"	Stefan Pleszczynski	Eric Wallace & Lauren Certo	March 5, 2019	T27.13765	1.67
108	16	"Failure Is an Orphan"	Viet Nguyen	Zack Stentz	March 12, 2019	T27.13766	1.55
109	17	"Time Bomb"	Rob Greenlea	Kristen Kim & Sterling Gates	March 19, 2019	T27.13767	1.64
110	18	"Godspeed"	Danielle Panabaker	Judalina Neira & Kelly Wheeler	April 16, 2019	T27.13768	1.31
111	19	"Snow Pack"	Jeff Cassidy	Jonathan Butler & Gabriel Garza	April 23, 2019	T27.13769	1.63
112	20	"Gone Rogue"	Kristin Windell	Sam Chalsen & Joshua V. Gilbert	April 30, 2019	T27.13770	1.37
113	21	"The Girl with the Red Lightning"	Stefan Pleszczynski	Judalina Neira & Thomas Pound	May 7, 2019	T27.13771	1.45
114	22	"Legacy"	Gregory Smith	Story by : Lauren Certo; Teleplay by : Todd Helbing & Eric Wallace	May 14, 2019	T27.13772	1.53

=== Season 6 (2019–20) ===
The Flash season 6 episodes
No. overall	No. in season	Title	Directed by	Written by	Original release date	Prod. code	U.S. viewers (millions)
Graphic Novel #1: Blood and Truth
115	1	"Into the Void"	Gregory Smith	Eric Wallace & Kelly Wheeler	October 8, 2019	T27.14001	1.62
116	2	"A Flash of the Lightning"	Chris Peppe	Sam Chalsen & Jeff Hersh	October 15, 2019	T27.14002	1.27
117	3	"Dead Man Running"	Sarah Boyd	Lauren Barnett & Thomas Pound	October 22, 2019	T27.14003	1.38
118	4	"There Will Be Blood"	Marcus Stokes	Lauren Certo & Sterling Gates	October 29, 2019	T27.14004	1.48
119	5	"Kiss Kiss Breach Breach"	Menhaj Huda	Kelly Wheeler & Joshua V. Gilbert	November 5, 2019	T27.14005	1.19
120	6	"License to Elongate"	Danielle Panabaker	Thomas Pound & Jeff Hersh	November 19, 2019	T27.14006	1.29
121	7	"The Last Temptation of Barry Allen"	Chad Lowe	Kristen Kim & Joshua V. Gilbert	November 26, 2019	T27.14007	1.17
122	8	"The Last Temptation of Barry Allen"	Michael Nankin	Jonathan Butler & Gabriel Garza	December 3, 2019	T27.14008	1.32
123	9	"Crisis on Infinite Earths: Part Three"	David McWhirter	Story by : Eric Wallace; Teleplay by : Lauren Certo & Sterling Gates	December 10, 2019	T27.14009	1.73
Graphic Novel #2: Reflections and Lies
124	10	"Marathon"	Stefan Pleszczynski	Sam Chalsen & Lauren Barnett	February 4, 2020	T27.14010	1.27
125	11	"Love Is a Battlefield"	Sudz Sutherland	Kelly Wheeler & Jeff Hersh	February 11, 2020	T27.14011	1.13
126	12	"A Girl Named Sue"	Chris Peppe	Thomas Pound & Lauren Certo	February 18, 2020	T27.14012	1.10
127	13	"Grodd Friended Me"	Stefan Pleszczynski	Kristen Kim & Joshua V. Gilbert	February 25, 2020	T27.14013	1.17
128	14	"Death of the Speed Force"	Brent Crowell	Sam Chalsen & Emily Palizzi	March 10, 2020	T27.14014	1.03
129	15	"The Exorcism of Nash Wells"	Eric Dean Seaton	Lauren Barnett & Sterling Gates	March 17, 2020	T27.14015	1.19
130	16	"So Long and Goodnight"	Alexandra La Roche	Kristen Kim & Thomas Pound	April 21, 2020	T27.14016	1.09
131	17	"Liberation"	Jeff Byrd	Jonathan Butler & Gabriel Garza	April 28, 2020	T27.14017	1.18
132	18	"Pay the Piper"	Amanda Tapping	Jess Carson	May 5, 2020	T27.14018	1.22
133	19	"Success Is Assured"	Philip Chipera	Kelly Wheeler & Lauren Barnett	May 12, 2020	T27.14019	1.08

=== Season 7 (2021) ===
The Flash season 7 episodes
No. overall	No. in season	Title	Directed by	Written by	Original release date	Prod. code	U.S. viewers (millions)
134	1	"All's Wells That Ends Wells"	Geoff Shotz	Sam Chalsen & Lauren Certo	March 2, 2021	T27.14151	1.00
135	2	"The Speed of Thought"	Alexandra La Roche	Jonathan Butler & Gabriel Garza	March 9, 2021	T27.14152	0.99
136	3	"Mother"	David McWhirter	Eric Wallace & Kristen Kim	March 16, 2021	T27.14153	0.98
Graphic Novel #3: God Complex
137	4	"Central City Strong"	Jeff Byrd	Story by : Kristen Kim; Teleplay by : Joshua V. Gilbert & Jeff Hersh	March 23, 2021	T27.14154	0.98
138	5	"Fear Me"	David McWhirter	Story by : Thomas Pound; Teleplay by : Lauren Barnett & Christina M. Walker	March 30, 2021	T27.14155	0.91
139	6	"The One with the Nineties"	Jeff Byrd	Kelly Wheeler & Emily Palizzi	April 6, 2021	T27.14156	0.97
140	7	"Growing Pains"	Alexandra La Roche	Sam Chalsen & Jess Carson	April 13, 2021	T27.14157	0.89
141	8	"The People V. Killer Frost"	Sudz Sutherland	Jonathan Butler & Gabriel Garza	May 4, 2021	T27.14158	0.74
142	9	"Timeless"	Menhaj Huda	Kristen Kim & Joshua V. Gilbert	May 11, 2021	T27.14159	0.74
143	10	"Family Matters, Part 1"	Philip Chipera	Lauren Barnett & Emily Palizzi	May 18, 2021	T27.14160	0.67
144	11	"Family Matters, Part 2"	Chad Lowe	Story by : Jonathan Butler & Gabriel Garza; Teleplay by : Thomas Pound	May 25, 2021	T27.14161	0.64
Interlude I
145	12	"Good-Bye Vibrations"	Philip Chipera	Kelly Wheeler & Jeff Hersh	June 8, 2021	T27.14162	0.74
146	13	"Masquerade"	Rachel Talalay	Sam Chalsen & Christina M. Walker	June 15, 2021	T27.14163	0.76
147	14	"Rayo de Luz"	Danielle Panabaker	Story by : Jess Carson; Teleplay by : Jonathan Butler & Gabriel Garza	June 22, 2021	T27.14164	0.79
Graphic Novel #4: The Godspeed Imperative
148	15	"Enemy at the Gates"	Geoff Shotz	Story by : Joshua V. Gilbert; Teleplay by : Thomas Pound	June 29, 2021	T27.14165	0.77
149	16	"P.O.W."	Marcus Stokes	Kristen Kim & Dan Fisk	July 6, 2021	T27.14166	0.77
150	17	"Heart of the Matter, Part 1"	Eric Dean Seaton	Eric Wallace & Lauren Barnett	July 13, 2021	T27.14167	0.75
151	18	"Heart of the Matter, Part 2"	Marcus Stokes	Eric Wallace & Kelly Wheeler	July 20, 2021	T27.14168	0.70

=== Season 8 (2021–22) ===
The Flash season 8 episodes
No. overall	No. in season	Title	Directed by	Written by	Original release date	Prod. code	U.S. viewers (millions)
Graphic Novel #5: Armageddon
152	1	"Armageddon, Part 1"	Eric Dean Seaton	Eric Wallace	November 16, 2021	T27.14801	0.75
153	2	"Armageddon, Part 2"	Menhaj Huda	Jonathan Butler & Gabriel Garza	November 23, 2021	T27.14802	0.67
154	3	"Armageddon, Part 3"	Chris Peppe	Sam Chalsen	November 30, 2021	T27.14803	0.73
155	4	"Armageddon, Part 4"	Chad Lowe	Lauren Barnett	December 7, 2021	T27.14804	0.73
156	5	"Armageddon, Part 5"	Menhaj Huda	Kristen Kim	December 14, 2021	T27.14805	0.72
Interlude II
157	6	"Impulsive Excessive Disorder"	David McWhirter	Thomas Pound	March 9, 2022	T27.14806	0.59
158	7	"Lockdown"	Stefan Pleszczynski	Christina M. Walker	March 16, 2022	T27.14807	0.56
Graphic Novel #6: Death Revisited
159	8	"The Fire Next Time"	David McWhirter	Joshua V. Gilbert	March 23, 2022	T27.14808	0.69
160	9	"Phantoms"	Stefan Pleszczynski	Jeff Hersh	March 30, 2022	T27.14809	0.54
161	10	"Reckless"	Kellie Cyrus	Jess Carson	April 6, 2022	T27.14810	0.57
162	11	"Resurrection"	Greg Beeman	Emily Palizzi	April 13, 2022	T27.14811	0.64
163	12	"Death Rises"	Philip Chipera	Story by : Alex Boyd; Teleplay by : Arielle McAlpin & Dan Fisk	April 27, 2022	T27.14812	0.56
164	13	"Death Falls"	Chris Peppe	Story by : Sam Chalsen; Teleplay by : Joshua V. Gilbert	May 4, 2022	T27.14813	0.53
Interlude III
165	14	"Funeral for a Friend"	Vanessa Parise	Story by : Jonathan Butler & Gabriel Garza; Teleplay by : Jeff Hersh	May 11, 2022	T27.14814	0.48
166	15	"Into the Still Force"	Eric Wallace	Lauren Barnett & Christina M. Walker	May 18, 2022	T27.14815	0.55
167	16	"The Curious Case of Bartholomew Allen"	Caity Lotz	Thomas Pound & Jess Carson	May 25, 2022	T27.14816	0.54
Graphic Novel #7: It's All Negative
168	17	"Keep It Dark"	Danielle Panabaker	Kristen Kim & Emily Palizzi	June 8, 2022	T27.14817	0.58
169	18	"The Man in the Yellow Tie"	Marcus Stokes	Sam Chalsen	June 15, 2022	T27.14818	0.50
170	19	"Negative, Part One"	Jeff Byrd	Jonathan Butler & Gabriel Garza	June 22, 2022	T27.14819	0.59
171	20	"Negative, Part Two"	Marcus Stokes	Eric Wallace	June 29, 2022	T27.14820	0.56

=== Season 9 (2023) ===
The Flash season 9 episodes
No. overall	No. in season	Title	Directed by	Written by	Original release date	Prod. code	U.S. viewers (millions)
Graphic Novel #8: Rogue War
172	1	"Wednesday Ever After"	Vanessa Parise	Teleplay by : Thomas Pound & Sarah Tarkoff; Story by : Eric Wallace	February 8, 2023	T27.14901	0.51
173	2	"Hear No Evil"	Eric Wallace	Jonathan Butler & Kristen Kim	February 15, 2023	T27.14902	0.51
174	3	"Rogues of War"	Brenton Spencer	Teleplay by : Jeff Hersh & Jess Carson; Story by : Sam Chalsen	February 22, 2023	T27.14903	0.49
175	4	"The Mask of the Red Death, Part 1"	Menhaj Huda	Joshua V. Gilbert & Emily Palizzi	March 1, 2023	T27.14904	0.57
176	5	"The Mask of the Red Death, Part 2"	Rachel Talalay	Teleplay by : Dan Fisk; Story by : Jonathan Butler	March 8, 2023	T27.14905	0.56
Interlude IV
177	6	"The Good, the Bad and the Lucky"	Chad Lowe	Thomas Pound & Jess Carson	March 15, 2023	T27.14906	0.57
178	7	"Wildest Dreams"	Jesse Warn	Kristen Kim & Jeff Hersh	March 29, 2023	T27.14907	0.45
179	8	"Partners in Time"	Ed Fraiman	Sarah Tarkoff & Joshua V. Gilbert	April 5, 2023	T27.14908	0.52
180	9	"It's My Party and I'll Die If I Want To"	Danielle Panabaker	Sam Chalsen & Emily Palizzi	April 26, 2023	T27.14909	0.54
Graphic Novel #9: A New World
181	10	"A New World, Part One" (Note: Subtitled "Reunions" on-screen.)	Eric Wallace	Eric Wallace & Thomas Pound	May 3, 2023	T27.14910	0.42
182	11	"A New World, Part Two" (Note: Subtitled "The Blues" on-screen.)	Kayla Compton	Teleplay by : Kristen Kim; Story by : Lauren Fields	May 10, 2023	T27.14911	0.39
183	12	"A New World, Part Three" (Note: Subtitled "Changes" on-screen.)	Stefan Pleszczynski	Jonathan Butler & Sarah Tarkoff	May 17, 2023	T27.14912	0.46
184	13	"A New World, Part Four" (Note: Subtitled "Finale" on-screen.)	Vanessa Parise	Eric Wallace & Sam Chalsen	May 24, 2023	T27.14913	0.46

== Home media ==
Home media releases of The Flash
Season	DVD release dates			Blu-ray release dates	
Season	Region 1	Region 2	Region 4	Region A	Region B
1	September 22, 2015	September 21, 2015	September 23, 2015	September 22, 2015	September 21, 2015
2	September 6, 2016	September 12, 2016	September 7, 2016	September 6, 2016	September 12, 2016
3	September 5, 2017	September 11, 2017	September 6, 2017	September 5, 2017	September 11, 2017
4	August 28, 2018	September 24, 2018	August 27, 2018	August 28, 2018	September 24, 2018
5	August 27, 2019	September 23, 2019	August 28, 2019	August 27, 2019	September 23, 2019
6	August 25, 2020	August 24, 2020	August 26, 2020	August 25, 2020	August 24, 2020
7	October 12, 2021	November 8, 2021	October 13, 2021	October 12, 2021	November 8, 2021
8	October 18, 2022	October 17, 2022	October 13, 2022	October 18, 2022	October 17, 2022
9	August 29, 2023	August 28, 2023	August 30, 2023	August 29, 2023	August 28, 2023
