= Flash vs. Arrow =

First crossover event between television series The Flash and Arrow

- Arrowverse crossover event
- Promotional poster
- Story by: Greg Berlanti; Andrew Kreisberg

Part 1: The Flash
- Episode title: "Flash vs. Arrow"
- Episode no.: Season 1 Episode 8
- Directed by: Glen Winter
- Teleplay by: Ben Sokolowski; Brooke Eikmeier
- Production code: 3J5358
- Original air date: December 2, 2014

Episode chronology
← Previous "Power Outage"	Next → "The Man in the Yellow Suit"
- The Flash season 1

Part 2: Arrow
- Episode title: "The Brave and the Bold"
- Episode no.: Season 3 Episode 8
- Directed by: Jesse Warn
- Teleplay by: Marc Guggenheim; Grainne Godfree
- Production code: 3J5158
- Original air date: December 3, 2014

Episode chronology
← Previous "Draw Back Your Bow"	Next → "The Climb"
- Arrow season 3

Crossover chronology
- Followed by: Heroes Join Forces

"Flash vs. Arrow" is the inaugural Arrowverse crossover event, broadcast on The CW, featuring episodes of the Arrowverse television series The Flash and Arrow. The event began on December 2, 2014, with The Flash episode "Flash vs. Arrow" and concluded the next day with the Arrow episode "The Brave and the Bold". The crossover sees Team Flash (Barry Allen / Flash, Caitlin Snow, and Cisco Ramon) helping Team Arrow (Oliver Queen / Arrow, Felicity Smoak, and John Diggle) take on the boomerang-wielding villain Captain Boomerang, while Team Arrow helps Team Flash confront the metahuman Roy Bivolo.

A crossover between the two series was announced in July 2014, after Barry Allen had been introduced in Arrow's second season ahead of the debut of The Flash. By the following September, the scripts for each episode had been written, with filming occurring shortly before the end of the month and into October 2014. The crossover sees every main cast member of each series who appear at least in their own series, with additional actors and characters also reprising their Arrowverse roles.

The episodes received positive reviews, with critics calling the crossover enjoyable and praising the producers for bringing the two series together while keeping the episodes as self-contained adventures. They also highlighted the fight scene between the Flash and Arrow as living up to the hype. Ratings for the episodes were exceptional, with both being the highest watched episodes of each show since their respective series premieres. A subsequent crossover occurred the following year, titled "Heroes Join Forces".

== Plot ==
Roy Bivolo, a metahuman with the power to send people into an uncontrollable rage, uses his powers to rob the Central City bank. Police detective Eddie Thawne proposes to capture the Flash because he was at the crime scene, but is rejected by the captain. The police track Bivolo to a warehouse, where he uses his powers on a cop to facilitate his escape. Barry Allen arrives to save Joe West, but is almost injured himself before Oliver Queen, as the "Arrow" vigilante, arrives to stop the cop. Later, Oliver informs Barry that he and his team are in Central City tracking down intel on a killer who uses lethal steel boomerangs. Barry and his friends suggests that they team-up to catch each other's targets and Oliver reluctantly agrees. Oliver tries to teach Barry to be more mindful of his surroundings, but Barry decides to go after Bivolo by himself. Bivolo uses his ability on Barry's mind; but because of Barry's speed, its effects last longer and he begins to snap at those he cares for.

Eddie continues to persuade his superiors to form a task force unit to capture the Flash, expressing his zero tolerance for vigilantes. When an enraged Barry, as the Flash, attacks Eddie, Oliver tries to stop Barry, and the two engage in a fight. Oliver manages to wrangle Barry long enough for Harrison Wells and Joe to use strobe light to reset Barry's emotional state. Barry and Oliver capture Bivolo and place him in the pipeline prison at S.T.A.R. Labs. Due to the incident, Eddie forms a task unit to arrest the Flash. Barry confirms Oliver's belief that the former has still a lot to learn. Oliver advises him to stay away from Iris West, with whom Barry is in love, for a while, because men with secret identities as vigilantes never succeed romantically. Oliver asks Team Flash to keep his alter ego as the Arrow, a secret. A new mysterious metahuman able to manipulate fire appears in Central City.

In a flashback set in Hong Kong, Oliver learns how to torture suspects to gain information. In the present, Oliver and Roy Harper locate Digger Harkness, the boomerang-wielding killer, where they find A.R.G.U.S. operatives looking for him as well. Caitlin Snow and Cisco Ramon arrive in Starling City to help Felicity Smoak investigate Sara Lance's homicidal murderer. Digger attempts to kill Lyla Michaels, Roy, and Oliver, but Barry arrives and stops him. Later, Lyla reveals that Digger was part of the Suicide Squad. When Oliver uses his extreme interrogation methods on a Russian mob member to locate Digger, Barry questions how emotionally stable Oliver is with his past tragedies to torture people. Digger locates Oliver's base and wounds Lyla before escaping. In order to leave town, Digger plants five bombs around the city. While Oliver captures Digger, Barry uses both of their teams to defuse the bombs simultaneously. Digger is incarcerated on Lian Yu with Slade Wilson. Before Barry and his team's departure to Central City, Cisco and Caitlin gives Oliver his suit improvements and utilities, he and Oliver learned their lessons and decide to have a friendly duel.

== Cast and characters ==
=== Main ===
Main cast and characters
Actor	Character	Episode	
Actor	Character	The Flash	Arrow
Grant Gustin	Barry Allen / Flash	Main	Guest
Candice Patton	Iris West	Main	
Danielle Panabaker	Caitlin Snow	Main	Guest
Rick Cosnett	Eddie Thawne	Main	
Carlos Valdes	Cisco Ramon	Main	Guest
Tom Cavanagh	Harrison Wells	Main	
Jesse L. Martin	Joe West	Main	
Stephen Amell	Oliver Queen / Arrow	Guest	Main
David Ramsey	John Diggle	Guest	Main
Emily Bett Rickards	Felicity Smoak	Guest	Main
Katie Cassidy	Laurel Lance		Main
Willa Holland	Thea Queen		Main
Colton Haynes	Roy Harper / Arsenal		Main
Paul Blackthorne	Quentin Lance		Main

- Note: Despite being credited, John Barrowman does not appear in the Arrow episode.

=== Guest ===
==== The Flash ====
- Paul Anthony as Roy Bivolo / Rainbow Raider
- Anna Hopkins as Samantha Clayton
- Patrick Sabongui as David Singh
- Robbie Amell as Ronnie Raymond / Firestorm

==== Arrow ====
- Audrey Marie Anderson as Lyla Michaels
- Cynthia Addai-Robinson as Amanda Waller
- Nick E. Tarabay as Digger Harkness / Captain Boomerang

== Production ==
=== Development ===
The first indication of potential crossover events in the Arrowverse occurred on The CW during the 2013–14 television season, when Barry Allen was introduced in the eighth episode of Arrow's second season ahead of the debut of The Flash. In July 2014, it was announced that the eighth episodes of the third season of Arrow and the first season of The Flash would be a two-hour crossover event. The crossover was originally planned as the seventh episodes of each series, but was pushed back due to the large amount of work needed to accomplish it. In particular, the schedule coordination of trying to "jam another episode into the 23-episode schedule for each of [the] shows." Marc Guggenheim, creator and executive producer on Arrow, explained that there was "no financially responsible" way of executing the crossover, with budgets being blown, long hours and the actors having to film scenes from both series on the same day.

Andrew Kreisberg, creator and executive producer on both series, said, "It's really going to be an adventure with the Arrow and Flash on both episodes. Watching the two teams come together and fight alongside each other, it's one of the most fun parts, ... we just don't believe in waiting. We really believe in accelerated storytelling." Kreisberg explained that since they are all comic book fans themselves, they have all debated the age-old question of which superhero would win in a fight; "So, the idea that [the Flash and Arrow] would fight each other in one of these episodes was one of our earliest ideas, and that the cast members would have that Comic-Con argument on camera was one of our earliest ideas." Greg Berlanti, creator and executive producer on both series, explained that "crossovers are part of [the characters'] DNA, ... and if we waited ..., then we would be depriving the audience of something we all wanted to see".

In October 2014, Kreisberg described the episodes as very important to both Barry and Oliver and what they are going thorough, while also promising "one of the biggest surprises for Arrow of all time in The Flash episode". Guggenheim added, "It's like the bomb underneath the table, and I think part of the fun is waiting to see when Oliver is going to learn what the audience learns on Flash." It was later announced that another secret would be revealed in the final moments of The Flash episode that will help "introduce the next phase of The Flash in a big way". In the episode, Oliver runs into an ex-girlfriend, last seen pregnant with his child in season two of Arrow and had been told by Oliver's mother Moira to tell him that she'd lost the baby and disappear. It is revealed to the viewers that she has a child and it is presumed to be Oliver's. After the airing of the episode, Guggenheim confirmed that indeed it was Oliver's child. At the end of the episode, Robbie Amell, who played Ronnie Raymond—Caitlin's former fiancée presumed dead after the particle accelerator explosion—appears as Firestorm. In 2019, looking back at the crossover, Guggenheim recalled it seemed "so hard at the time" but in comparison to later crossovers, "it was embarrassingly easy... but the two storylines of each episode were relatively separate from each other. So, it wasn't that narratively ambitious."

=== Writing ===
The scripts for the "Flash vs. Arrow" crossover were written in mid-September 2014, with Berlanti and Kreisberg creating the story for the two episodes. Berlanti drew inspiration from science fiction action television series The Six Million Dollar Man and The Bionic Woman for the story, while Kreisberg took his cues from the final episode of the fourth series of Doctor Who, titled "Journey's End", a crossover featuring the characters of spin-off shows Torchwood and The Sarah Jane Adventures. The teleplay for The Flash was written by Ben Sokolowski and Brooke Eikmeier, with Arrow's written by executive producers Guggenheim and Grainne Godfree.

In late September 2014, Guggenheim revealed that the Arrow episode would be titled "The Brave and the Bold", a reference to a title shared by many comic book series published by DC Comics which feature super-hero team-ups, including the Flash and Green Arrow. Guggenheim said:

I've never had so much fun writing a script before[.] ... It was such a blast to work on... I keep telling everyone that we should try for Avengers. It's these two heroes together with a big production value. ... There's the opportunity for inside jokes, and seeing all of the characters together. What happens when Cisco gets his eyes on Thea? There are moments like that, that you just can't do in a normal episode....It's just so much fun.

In October 2014, the title of The Flash episode was announced as "Flash vs. Arrow". Kreisberg revealed that the writers' rooms for both shows were merged while working on the scripts for the episodes, similar to "throwing two casts together". Both episodes were written as self-contained, with Kriesberg explaining, "[W]e were very conscious of not everybody who was watching Flash was watching Arrow and vice versa, so we wanted to make sure they both were self-contained episodes".

=== Filming ===
Filming of the two episodes occurred from September 24, 2014, until October 8, 2014. The Flash's episode was directed by Glen Winter, and Arrow's by Jesse Warn. The fight scene between the Flash and Arrow in The Flash episode was shot over three nights. Because this was the first time Stephen Amell's character fought someone with superpowers, he had to change the way he performed stunts to accommodate the special effects. Comparing the filming of both series, Grant Gustin described The Flash shooting as "really tedious," working with "a lot of plate shots that are empty shots of the area we are going to be in" and later added in post-production, as opposed to Arrow where "they shoot it from the perfect angles and what you see is what you get". Gustin also recalled at times it got confusing on set because they were shooting both episodes at the same time.

== Music ==
The Flash vs. Arrow (Music Selections from the Epic 2-Night Event)

Soundtrack album by Blake Neely
- Released: December 18, 2014
- Recorded: 2014
- Genre: Soundtrack
- Length: 49:57
- Label: WaterTower Music
- Producer: Blake Neely

Professional ratings
Review scores
Source	Rating
Soundtrack Geek	8.4/10 stars

On December 18, 2014, WaterTower Music released a selection of music from The Flash/Arrow crossover episodes, as well as two bonus tracks from their respective 2014 mid-season finales. Discussing the challenge of merging the themes of both shows into a cohesive score, composer Blake Neely noted that "It wasn't difficult because I originally designed the two shows to have styles and sounds that could merge and live together when necessary, but also hopefully stand alone as two distinct music worlds."

The two bonus tracks were included on the album because "they proved very popular with the fans of the special event". Neely said, "As we were coming to completion and [the album] was about to go, I got all these tweets about these two pieces that people were loving, [and] I just had this idea, let's throw them on as bonus tracks... The fans asked for it and they got it."

All music composed by Blake Neely.

Track listing
No.	Title	Length
1.	"Rainbow Raider Strikes"	2:24
2.	"Don't Get Involved"	0:41
3.	"Team Arrow in Central City"	2:30
4.	"Training Barry"	1:55
5.	"What's Up, Doc"	2:21
6.	"Barry Gets Whammied"	3:05
7.	"The Flash vs. Arrow"	5:06
8.	"S.T.A.R. Labs Thanks Oliver"	1:51
9.	"Firestorm Appears"	0:52
10.	"Looking for Boomerang"	2:36
11.	"Like a Kid in a Candy Store"	1:26
12.	"Boomerang in A.R.G.U.S."	4:00
13.	"Teaming Up"	1:50
14.	"Torture Tactics"	2:16
15.	"Hope for Saving People Like Us"	1:44
16.	"Light Inside You"	2:28
17.	"Disarming the Bombs"	3:54
18.	"Gift Exchange"	1:30
19.	"The Brave and the Bold"	1:44
20.	"The Man in the Yellow Suit" (Bonus Track)	2:15
21.	"The Climb" (Bonus Track)	3:29
Total length:		49:57

== Release ==
=== Broadcast ===
The "Flash vs. Arrow" crossover episodes were shown at an exclusive fan screening at the Crest Theatre in Westwood, Los Angeles on November 22, 2014. Afterwards, Amell, Gustin, David Ramsey, Emily Bett Rickards, Danielle Panabaker and Carlos Valdes were joined by executive producers Berlanti, Kreisberg and Guggenheim for a Q&A panel.

The first part of the crossover, The Flash, was broadcast on December 2, 2014, followed by part two on Arrow on December 3, both on The CW. The crossover was simulcast with the US broadcast in Canada on CTV. It first aired in the United Kingdom on Channel 5 on December 16 and 18, 2014. In Australia, the episodes aired back-to-back on January 28, 2015, on Fox8, after Nine Network, which broadcasts Arrow, allowed Fox8 to air the Arrow episode of the crossover.

=== Home media ===
The episodes, along with the rest of The Flash's first season and Arrow's third season, were released separately on Blu-ray and DVD on September 22, 2015. Bonus features include behind-the-scenes featurettes, audio commentary, deleted scenes, and a blooper reel. The episodes became available for streaming on Netflix on October 6 and 7, 2015, respectively.

== Reception ==
=== Ratings ===
Viewership and ratings per episode of Flash vs. Arrow
No.	Series	Air date	Rating/share (18–49)	Viewers (millions)	DVR (18–49)	DVR viewers (millions)	Total (18–49)	Total viewers (millions)
1	The Flash	December 2, 2014	1.6/5	4.34	1.0	2.31	2.6	6.65
2	Arrow	December 3, 2014	1.4/4	3.92	—N/a	—N/a	—N/a	—N/a

The Flash episode had the second-highest number of viewers following the series premiere on October 7, 2014, and the highest 18-49 rating since the second episode. Viewership rose 22% and the 18-49 rating by 14%, over the previous episode, "Power Outage". The Arrow episode was the most viewed of season three, and had the show's largest audience since the series' premiere on October 10, 2012, and a series high 18–49 rating. Its viewership grew by 46% and its 18-49 rating by 56% over the previous episode, "Draw Back Your Bow", and helped contribute to the most watched Wednesday on The CW in more than two years.

The Canadian broadcast of The Flash was watched by 2.45 million viewers, earning the highest viewership for the week. The Arrow broadcast had 2.22 million viewers, the second highest for that day, and the fourth highest for the week. In the United Kingdom, the episodes had 1.5 million viewers and 980,000 viewers, respectively. The time shifted versions attracted a total of 1.63 million and 1.26 million viewers, respectively.

After the crossover aired, both shows saw increases to their ratings compared to their respective episodes before the crossover. The Flash "surprising[ly]" dipped a mere 6% in the 18–49 rating and rose 4% in total viewers, from the crossover episode, on "a heavily competitive night" for its most watched episode since its series premiere. The following Arrow episode dropped by 29% in the 18–49 rating, from the crossover episode. However, compared to its episode before the crossover, Arrow rose in the 18–49 rating, tying its second best rating of the season, behind only the crossover episode with The Flash.

=== Critical response ===
After the first Arrow and Flash crossover, Brian Lowry of Variety applauded the producers for replicating the success of Arrow, but with "a lighter tone," and "a hero with genuine super powers" in The Flash. He noted while the crossover "does a nifty job of bringing the two series together" it was unlikely "to boost the shared audience between them much more than already exists". Meredith Borders of Birth.Movies.Death. called the crossover episodes "fun" noting that "plenty of show-specific plot stuff was advanced without spelling it out for newbies. New viewers to either show could follow along and have a good time, but veteran viewers were rewarded with major storyline motion."

Chancellor Agard, of Entertainment Weekly felt "the 'Flarrow'" crossover event was an overall success. Both episodes "put Team Flash in new situations and it was thrilling to watch how they reacted". Agard felt that while Arrow had "some great and comedic character moments for Team Arrow" none of its stories were advanced so that the episodes "felt like pause buttons" in its action.

==== The Flash ====
The review aggregator website Rotten Tomatoes reported a 100% approval rating, based on 21 reviews for the episode. The website's critical consensus reads, "The Flash pulls off a thrilling crossover with its sibling series, Arrow, by skillfully blending the two shows' disparate tones and showcasing its dueling superheroes' complementing strengths."

Jesse Schedeen of IGN gave The Flash episode a 7.8 out of 10. He said the "Flash vs. Arrow" episode was "fun" with its focus "on the sheer entertainment value in seeing these two heroes and their allies cross paths"... and "to see the relationship between Barry and Ollie continue to evolve". As "a largely standalone episode" its scope was limited resulting "in yet another underdeveloped villain." Scott Von Doviak writing for The A.V. Club awarded the episode an "A−", calling it "a satisfying showdown" that "actually stands on its own as a mostly self-contained hour of The Flash". Von Doviak complimented writers Greg Berlanti and Andrew Kreisberg, and director Glen Winter, for tackling the "clashing tones of the two shows" and the different personalities of their main characters, and "weaving...[them]... into the fabric of the episode". He also highlighted the fight scene between the Flash and Arrow, saying "It's a well-choreographed battle, with each hero appearing to have the upper hand at various points and clever bits of one-upmanship."

Collider's Dave Trumbore gave The Flash episode an "A−", saying, it was "fun" seeing the characters together. He noted that the episode pointed out the many challenges Barry Allen "faces as a young up-and-coming crimefighter". He felt that Arrow's "knocks" made the point that "Barry's superpowers are an amazing gift ... he must hone and perfect to become a truly heroic character." Trumbore also "loved how Arrow's attention to detail and commitment to bettering himself through training clashed with Flash's carefree style and almost lazy attitude when it came to beating up baddies". Agard's expectations for the episode were "not disappointed". He felt it delivered "on both the action front" with its impeccable, "epic" fight scene, and "on the character front". While the viewer can enjoy the interaction between the teams everything that happens in the episode pushes "this The Flash's stories forward".

Eric Walters of Paste awarded The Flash episode a 9.0 out of 10, stating, ""Flash vs. Arrow" was everything a fan could have wanted from a crossover event," noting it was "tight, well-paced, superbly written and, most importantly, fun...". Caroline Preece of Den of Geek also praised the episode, saying that it "was pretty much everything fans wanted and more". She noted this episode demonstrated how comic book ideas "can translate to the small screen if done with this much care, joy and enthusiasm". Given the "hype" she admired, and was "surprised" by the fact that even "with a little added Oliver, Felicity and Diggle thrown in," the crossover was not the focus of the whole episode.

==== Arrow ====
Rotten Tomatoes reported a 94% approval rating, based on 18 reviews for the episode. The website's critical consensus reads, "This Arrowverse crossover episode manages to entertain while posing thoughtful questions about morality – and all without getting bogged down in meta references."

Giving the episode a 9.2 out of 10, Schedeen stated it was a "blast to watch" and was "a more cohesive and satisfying episode than the first". Noting that the crossover "wasted some of its potential by delivering two mostly standalone episodes," the Arrow episode was "more consistently entertaining and satisfying than the first". He enjoyed Captain Boomerang suggesting he could be the "most memorable villain to debut this season". Schedeen enjoyed the teams continuing to cross paths, the drama between Barry and Ollie, and "the balance between light and dark [the crossover] needed". Alasdair Wilkins of The A.V. Club gave the episode an "A−", saying it "..can just cut loose and have some ['effortless'] fun for an hour," noting that Barry "is one of the only characters able to call Oliver out on his more mopey strains of bullshit". He felt it was "fitting" the episode "shared the name—"The Brave And The Bold"—with DC Comics' long-running team-up comic". The Flash is "the brave one", who "inspires with his courage" though his "simplistic sense of right and wrong" can lead him to overlook "the darker side of what they do". Oliver is "the bold one", "willing to do whatever it takes to see justice served".

Trumbore felt the episode of Arrow closed out the crossover "in spectacular fashion" and gave it an "A". He noted that "both heroes channel their respective cities into their character". Barry Allen's approach to crimefighting is effervescent and "carefree" reflecting "Central City's cutting-edge technology" and "squeaky-clean streets". "Queen's Starling City" with its "ruthless underworld" is "much like the personality of the masked crimefighter himself". He felt the writing was clever in that it allowed the characters to "clash at times, but also ... allow[ed] them to come together in pursuit of a common goal". However, Agard felt Arrow "was a decent enough episode", but not "as good as the first". "'The Brave and the Bold'... felt... like a crossover episode ... servic[ing] Oliver's identity issues and character development." Agrad felt that "Cisco fanboying all over the place" is "fun" and Captain Boomerang is a "most formidable and compelling opponent because he uses strategy and plans multiple steps ahead".

Mark Rozeman at Paste, gave the Arrow episode a 9.3 out of 10, saying, the episode "not only equals its brother episode but, in some ways, manages to surpass it". He saw it as season's "strongest" Arrow episode, and "a great conclusion to the very successful Arrow/The Flash crossover" where in an "emotionally charged hour...all the elements come together with remarkable dexterity". He felt the shows' creative teams should be "applauded" for avoiding a "half-assed bid for ratings" instead turning the crossover "into something that brought out the best of each show". Rozeman argued that if "Flash vs. Arrow" proves that The Flash can stand on its own, then "The Brave and the Bold" is "a great demonstration that Arrow has some fire in it yet." Den of Geek's Mike Cecchini said the episode is "a remarkably self-contained adventure". Noting that both episodes worked well as standalones, "Flash vs. Arrow" was "very clearly an episode" of The Flash and "The Brave and The Bold" is "absolutely an Arrow episode ... handily the best installment of Arrow season three so far". He felt the cinematic scoring was "great" giving the episode 4.5 stars out of 5.

=== Accolades ===
TVLine named the "Flash vs. Arrow" crossover the 9th biggest television moment of 2014 saying, "There are crossovers. And there are superhero shows. But never in recent TV memory have two live-action costumed crimefighters clashed in super fashion (albeit under extenuating circumstances). The Flash's smooth moves versus Arrow's strength and stratagem made for a thrilling tango that lived up to the hype." IGN ranked the showdown between the Flash and Arrow in The Flash episode as one of the best television fight scenes of 2014. ScreenRant named both "Flash vs. Arrow" and "The Brave and the Bold" as one of the best television episodes of 2014. Blastr and Zap2it also named The Flash episode "Flash vs. Arrow" one of the best television episodes of 2014.
