= Infantino Street =

- The Flash episode
- Episode no.: Season 3 Episode 22
- Directed by: Michael A. Allowitz
- Story by: Andrew Kreisberg
- Teleplay by: Grainne Godfree
- Production code: T27.13122
- Original air date: April 16, 2017

Guest appearances
- Wentworth Miller as Leonard Snart; Audrey Marie Anderson as Lyla Michaels; Anne Dudek as Tracy Brand; Tobin Bell as Savitar (voice)

Episode chronology
← Previous "Cause and Effect"	Next → "Finish Line"
- The Flash season 3

"Infantino Street" is the 22nd and penultimate episode of the third season of the American television series The Flash. Based on the DC Comics character Barry Allen / Flash, the series follows Barry Allen (Grant Gustin) a crime scene investigator who gains superhuman speed, which he uses to fight criminals, including others who have also gained superhuman abilities. The episode was written by executive producer Andrew Kreisberg and Grainne Godfree, and directed by Michael A. Allowitz. "Infantino Street" features the death of Iris West at the hands of Savitar, a moment which most of the third season was dedicated to preventing.

"Infantino Street" first aired on The CW on April 16, 2017, to an audience of 2.48 million viewers. It was met with praise from critics, particularly Iris's death in the episodes closing moments. The ending was undone in the following episode. It guest stars Wentworth Miller and Audrey Marie Anderson reprising their role as Leonard Snart and Lyla Michaels.

== Plot ==
With 24 hours left before Iris dies, Team Flash makes their final preparations: Cisco Ramon and Tracy Brand learn that there is only one energy source that can power the "Speed Force Bazooka"; the salvaged Dominator battery held by A.R.G.U.S. However, director Lyla Micheals refuses to hand it over because of her mistrust of Barry Allen due to his abuse of time travel erasing her daughter from time.

Running out of options Barry travels back to 1892 Siberia and recruits Leonard Snart, when he was travelling with the Legends, to help steal the device from A.R.G.U.S. The robbery goes well and as they make it to the device only to discover it is being protected by King Shark. Barry prepares to break his "no kill rule", but Snart stops him and uses the cold gun to put him to sleep. They steal the battery, waking King Shark and triggering a lock down in the process. Snart is unable to get out in time, Barry manages to cut King Sharks arm off. Moments later, A.R.G.U.S. arrive and capture Barry and Snart, but Lyla seeing the kindness in Barry's actions allows him to take the device. Snart advises Barry to use the goodness in him to defeat Savitar.

Back at S.T.A.R. Labs, Cisco has a vision about his battle with Killer Frost and leaves to fight her. While Barry goes to return Snart, Joe West hides Iris Earth-2 with Harry Wells, but Savitar tricks H. R. Wells into revealing her location by pretending to be Barry. He travels to Earth-2 and kidnaps her. Both Barry and Savitar travel to Infantino Street and fight, Barry uses the "Speed Force Bazooka" on Savitar, but it fails when Savitar counteracts it with the Philosopher's Stone, which is made out of calcified speed force energy. Savitar then stabs Iris in the back seemingly killing her, before escaping.

== Production ==
"Infantino Street" was written by executive producer Andrew Kreisberg and Grainne Godfree, and directed by Michael A. Allowitz. The story was written by Kreisberg, and the teleplay was written by Godfree. The title of the episode is an homage to Silver Age comic book writer Carmine Infantino. Infantino served as a writer of the The Flash comic book and a co-creator of the character.

"Infantino Street" features the death of Iris West at the hands of Savitar, a moment which most of The Flash's third season had been centered around preventing. The event was undone in the following episode, "Finish Line", where it was revealed that H.R. used technology to impersonate her. During the opening montage of episode Aurora's "Murder Song (5, 4, 3, 2, 1)" is played. The song was again heard during the death of Iris. Martin performs "What Does It Take?"

"Infantino Street" stars Grant Gustin as both Barry Allen / The Flash and Savitar, Candice Patton as Iris West, Danielle Panabaker as Killer Frost, Carlos Valdes as Cisco Ramon / Vibe, Tom Cavanagh as Harry and H.R. Wells, Jesse L. Martin as Joe West, and Keiynan Lonsdale as Wally West / Kid Flash. Wentworth Miller guest stars as Leonard Snart. Audrey Marie Anderson and Anne Dudek appear in recurring roles as Lyla Michaels and Tracy Brand respectively.

== Release ==
"Infantino Street" first aired on The CW on April 16, 2017. The episode was viewed by a live audience of 2.48 million viewers. It was fourth in its timeslot ahead of Brooklyn Nine-Nine but lower than episodes of The Middle, The Voice, and NCIS. It was the highest viewed episode on The CW that night above iZombie. It was eleventh of the night overall. When account for seven-day DVR viewership it was seen by an additional 1.42 million.

== Reception ==
On the review aggregator website Rotten Tomatoes, 100% of 10 critics' reviews are positive, with an average rating of 8/10. The website's critical consensus reads: "The Flash speeds out of season three's penultimate episode with an epic climax that could be the most exciting minutes of the series." The ending scene of the episode was praised, although many assumed it would be undone the following episode. Following the episode's release a popular fan theory was that H.R. was the one who died and not Iris, this ended up being true. Writing about the then-upcoming season finale ComicBook.com's Russ Burlingame wrote that "Infantino Street" featured a death "that almost nobody expects to remain in place".

Writing for IGN Jesse Schedeen rated the episode 9.4/10 writing "The Flash delivered a winning blend of humor and character drama as Captain Cold played his part in stopping Savitar." Writing for The A.V. Club Scott Von Doviak rated the episode a B. He praised the acting between Patton and Martin noting the chemistry between their characters. He also praised Miller's acting, comparing it to the then-recent Prison Break. Writing for Screen Rant, Sarah Moran praised the episode particularly the ending scene. Moran also noted the interactions between Leonard Snart and Barry Allen as a high point of the episode. TV Guide's Noel Kirkpatrick also praised the scene and noted that it was unlikely to be permanent. Kirkpatrick cited various in-universe and production reasons as to why.
