= Wu Kai-yu =

Taiwanese-American screenwriter

- 吳凱毓
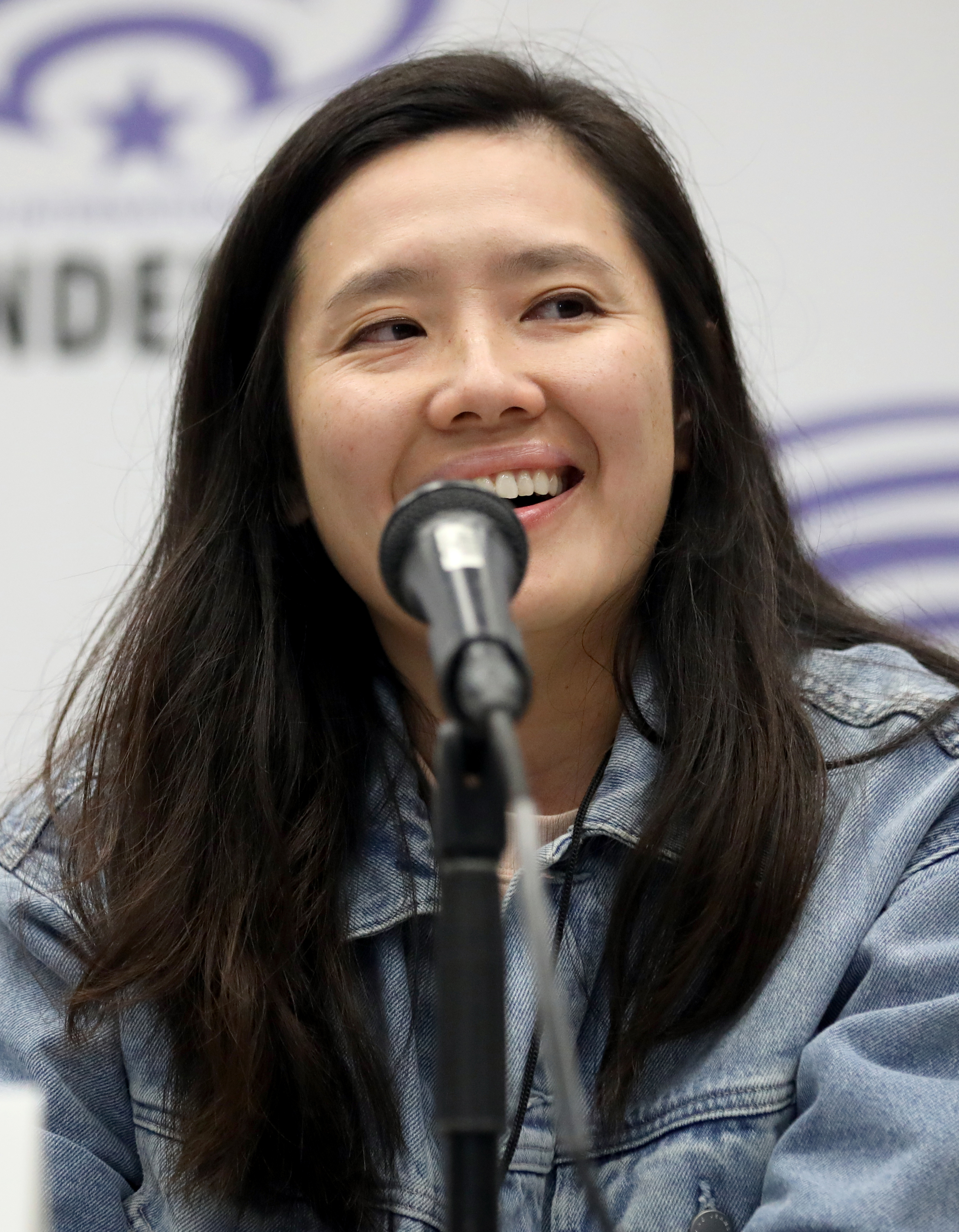
- Wu at the 2024 WonderCon
- Born: Taiwan
- Other names: Kai Wu
- Education: Carnegie Mellon University (BA)
- Occupation: Television writer
- Years active: 2006–present

Chinese name
- Traditional Chinese: 吳凱毓
Transcriptions
Standard Mandarin
- Hanyu Pinyin: Wú Kǎi-yù

Wu Kai-yu (Chinese: 吳凱毓; pinyin: Wú Kǎi-yù), also known as Kai Wu, is a Taiwanese-American screenwriter. She is well known for her work on the NBC horror series Hannibal, and for The CW superhero series The Flash. She also created the Netflix series The Ghost Bride.

== Life and career ==
Born in Taiwan, Wu was raised in Salisbury, Maryland. She graduated from Carnegie Mellon University with a bachelor's degree in fictional literature. After college, she moved to Los Angeles and was hired as an agency assistant.

Her first job in film was as an editorial assistant post-production coordinator on Danny Leiner's The Great New Wonderful. She then segued to television; working as an assistant to executive producers on the Syfy reboot Flash Gordon. She later went on to become an assistant to Matt Nix on USA's Burn Notice.

=== Hannibal ===
In 2013, Wu interviewed for an assistant position on the NBC Hannibal Lecter series Hannibal, but was instead hired as a staff writer by developer Bryan Fuller. Wu had previously written a pilot that was "a love letter" to Fuller titled Memory Bank, which he read and led to her hire. She went on to contribute to two episodes of the series ("Entrée" and "Naka-Choko").

=== The Flash ===
Wu serves as a writer on the DC Comics produced CW series The Flash. Her first contribution to the series was co-writing, with co-creator Geoff Johns, the first-season episode "Going Rogue", which introduces the supervillain Captain Cold/Leonard Snart (Wentworth Miller). She and Johns co-wrote the season's 10th installment, "Revenge of the Rogues", which saw the introduction of infamous rogue Heat Wave, who teams up with Captain Cold and challenges The Flash to a battle of fire and ice in an attempt to kill him and make him reveal himself to the world that he is real. She co-contributed, with Brooke Eikmeier, the teleplay for the sixteenth episode, "Rogue Time", with a story by story editor Grainne Godfree. She and Godfree re-teamed to co-pen the 18th installment "All Star Team Up"; which saw a crossover with sister-series Arrow; and then the 21st installment, "Grodd Lives".

In January 2015, Wu began writing, along with executive producer Andrew Kreisberg and Lauren Certo, the prequel comic book series The Flash: Season Zero.

Wu was promoted to executive story editor with the commencement of season two. She first co-wrote the fourth episode, along with new staff writer Joe Peracchio, "The Fury of Firestorm". It introduced the new half of the titular hero, Jax Jackson, and the first ever live action appearance by King Shark.
