= Duet (The Flash) =

- The Flash episode
- Promotional poster
- Episode no.: Season 3 Episode 17
- Directed by: Dermott Daniel Downs
- Story by: Greg Berlanti; Andrew Kreisberg
- Teleplay by: Aaron Helbing; Todd Helbing
- Production code: T27.13117
- Original air date: March 21, 2017

Guest appearances
- Melissa Benoist as Kara Danvers / Supergirl (special guest star); Victor Garber as Digsy Foss's husband (special guest star); John Barrowman as Cutter Moran (special guest star); Jeremy Jordan as Grady (special guest star); David Harewood as J'onn J'onzz / Martian Manhunter (special guest star); Chris Wood as Mon-El / Tommy Moran (special guest star); Darren Criss as Music Meister; Michelle Harrison as Nora Allen

Episode chronology
| ← Previous "Into the Speed Force" | Next → "Abra Kadabra" |

"Duet" is the seventeenth episode of the third season of The CW television series The Flash, which aired on March 21, 2017. It was written by Aaron Helbing and Todd Helbing from a story by Greg Berlanti and Andrew Kreisberg, and was directed by Dermott Daniel Downs. The episode features a musical crossover with Supergirl and reunites Grant Gustin and Melissa Benoist with their former Glee co-star Darren Criss, who portrays the Music Meister. Jesse L. Martin also reunites with Jeremy Jordan, with whom he previously worked in the 2012 musical film Joyful Noise.

The story begins at the end of the Supergirl episode "Star-Crossed", which aired on March 20, 2017. The episode sees Kara Danvers / Supergirl (Benoist) being hypnotized into a coma by the Music Meister, with Mon-El (Chris Wood) and J'onn J'onzz / Martian Manhunter (David Harewood) bringing her to Earth-1 in hope that Team Flash can save her.

== Plot ==
J'onn J'onzz and Mon-El of Earth-38 arrive on Earth-1 with a comatose Kara Danvers, in hope that Barry Allen and his team can revive her. They warn Barry that the escaped prisoner Music Meister is coming for him too. Meister attacks and places Barry in a similar coma.

Barry wakes up to find himself without his powers in a musical dream world where he discovers Kara singing in a nightclub ("Moon River") and where everyone resembles people they know in the real world. Meister tells Kara and Barry that if they follow the script, they will return to the real world. He warns them, however, that if they die in the dream world, they die in real life ("Put a Little Love in Your Heart").

Barry and Kara are forced to work as singers in a nightclub run by gangster Cutter Moran. Cutter's rivals Digsy Foss and his unnamed husband have their men kidnap Barry and Kara and tell them to find their daughter, Millie Foss, whom they believe is being held hostage by Cutter. Barry and Kara find Millie in a forbidden relationship with Cutter's son Tommy Moran. They convince the pair to reveal their love, which helps Barry and Kara to realize their own mistakes. Digsy, his husband, and Cutter seemingly give their approval ("More I Cannot Wish You"), but subsequently decide to go to war.

Meanwhile in the real world, Meister is revealed to have been stealing Barry and Kara's powers, using them to rob a bank. Cisco Ramon, Wally West, and J'onn arrive to fight Meister. They defeat him and lock him up in a S.T.A.R. Labs cell.

Back in the musical reality, Barry and Kara prepare to sing an original song to appease Cutter ("Super Friend"), but the gang war begins outside. Barry and Kara are shot in the crossfire and are dying, but Cisco, Mon-El and Iris enter the dreamworld to save them, allowing Barry and Kara to admit their love for Iris and Mon-El respectively.

They wake up in S.T.A.R. Labs. Meister escapes his cell, revealing to Barry and Kara that he just wanted them to realize their love before leaving. Kara, J'onn and Mon-El return to Earth-38 while Barry and Iris move back in together. Barry serenades and re-proposes to Iris, who accepts ("Runnin' Home to You").

== Production ==
=== Casting ===
Main cast members Grant Gustin, Candice Patton, Danielle Panabaker, Carlos Valdes, Keiynan Lonsdale, Tom Cavanagh, and Jesse L. Martin star as Barry Allen / Flash, Iris West, Caitlin Snow, Cisco Ramon / Vibe, Wally West / Kid Flash, Harrison Wells, and Joe West, respectively. In January 2017, Darren Criss was cast as Music Meister. Additionally, the episode's guest cast includes Melissa Benoist as Kara Danvers / Supergirl, David Harewood as J'onn J'onzz / Martian Manhunter and Chris Wood as Mon-El, reprising their roles from Supergirl, along with Legends of Tomorrow actor Victor Garber, Supergirl actor Jeremy Jordan, and John Barrowman from Arrow and Legends of Tomorrow playing different roles.

=== Filming ===
Filming of the episode occurred from February 1 until February 15, 2017, and was directed by series veteran Dermott Daniel Downs.

=== Music ===
The Flash – Music from the Special Episode: Duet

Soundtrack album by Various Artists
- Released: March 22, 2017
- Genre: Soundtrack
- Length: 17:16
- Label: WaterTower Music
- Producer: Blake Neely

In January 2017, Rachel Bloom revealed that she had penned an original song for the episode, which was titled "Super Friends", and was set to be sung by Gustin and Benoist. Bloom explained that, "as soon as I heard that they were doing a musical crossover, I e-mailed [CW president] Mark Pedowitz who connected me to Greg [Berlanti] and Andrew [Kreisberg]. I immediately offered them my services. As soon as they picked one of my song ideas, I hopped on the phone with my old Robot Chicken boss Tom Root and ... based on that brainstorm, I wrote up the song 'Superfriends'. I am so excited to contribute more to the upward trend that is musicals in television and film. Music can be one of the most amazing and efficient forms of storytelling and character development. Also, it was really fun to write a comedy song for two superheroes." The song was later retitled "Super Friend".

Additionally, Benj Pasek and Justin Paul, winners of the Academy Award for Best Original Song for writing the lyrics for "City of Stars" in La La Land, were the authors of another song written for the episode, "Runnin' Home to You", which was performed by Gustin. Kreisberg commented, "Benj and Justin are the premiere songwriting duo of our time... To have them be a part of our musical episode is beyond our wildest expectations. We hope everyone falls in love with the song they wrote for us as much as we did."

A soundtrack album for the episode, titled The Flash – Music from the Special Episode: Duet, was released on March 22, 2017, through WaterTower Music.

The Flash – Music from the Special Episode: Duet
| No. | Title | Writer(s) | Performer | Length |
|---|---|---|---|---|
| 1. | "Meet the Music Meister" | Blake Neely | | 2:45 |
| 2. | "Moon River" | Johnny Mercer; Henry Mancini | Melissa Benoist | 2:14 |
| 3. | "Put a Little Love in Your Heart" | Jackie DeShannon; Jimmy Holiday; Randy Myers | Darren Criss, Jeremy Jordan, Carlos Valdes and John Barrowman | 1:54 |
| 4. | "More I Cannot Wish You" | Frank Loesser | Jesse L. Martin, Victor Garber and John Barrowman | 2:38 |
| 5. | "Super Friend" | Rachel Bloom; Tom Root | Melissa Benoist and Grant Gustin | 2:14 |
| 6. | "Runnin' Home to You" | Benj Pasek; Justin Paul | Grant Gustin | 2:46 |
| 7. | "Runnin' Home to You" (guitar version) | Pasek; Paul | Grant Gustin | 2:45 |
| Total length: | | | | 17:16 |

== Release ==
=== Broadcast ===
After beginning in the ending scene of the March 20, 2017 episode of Supergirl, "Duet" aired in the United States on The CW on March 21, 2017. It was simulcast with the US broadcast in Canada on CTV Two.

=== Marketing ===
In early March 2017, a promotional poster for the episode was released, with it being marketed as "Dynamic Duet", a play on words of the phrase "dynamic duo". In Australia, where The Flash and Supergirl both air on Fox8, the crossover was marketed as a two-night event called "DC Musical Crossover".

== Critical response ==
Jesse Schedeen of IGN gave the episode an "amazing" 9.6 out of 10. He felt the premise was "goofy" but did a good job incorporating the existing continuity from both series, such as building "directly on recent romantic tribulations in Barry and Kara's lives." He enjoyed the team-up with Kid Flash, Martian Manhunter and Vibe, and was glad the writers did not "attempt to force in a romantic subplot involving Barry and Kara. As their "Super Friends" number showed, they're better as friends than lovers." The A.V. Club's Scott Von Doviak awarded the episode a "A−", saying there was good chemistry between Gustin and Benoist and that Gustin was able to "reconnect with the character's endearing side." Von Doviak concluded, "It's probably logistically untenable for them to ever be more than 'super friends,' but if this show ever needed the positive energy they generate together, now was certainly the time."
