= Aaron and Todd Helbing =

American sibling screenwriters

Todd Helbing
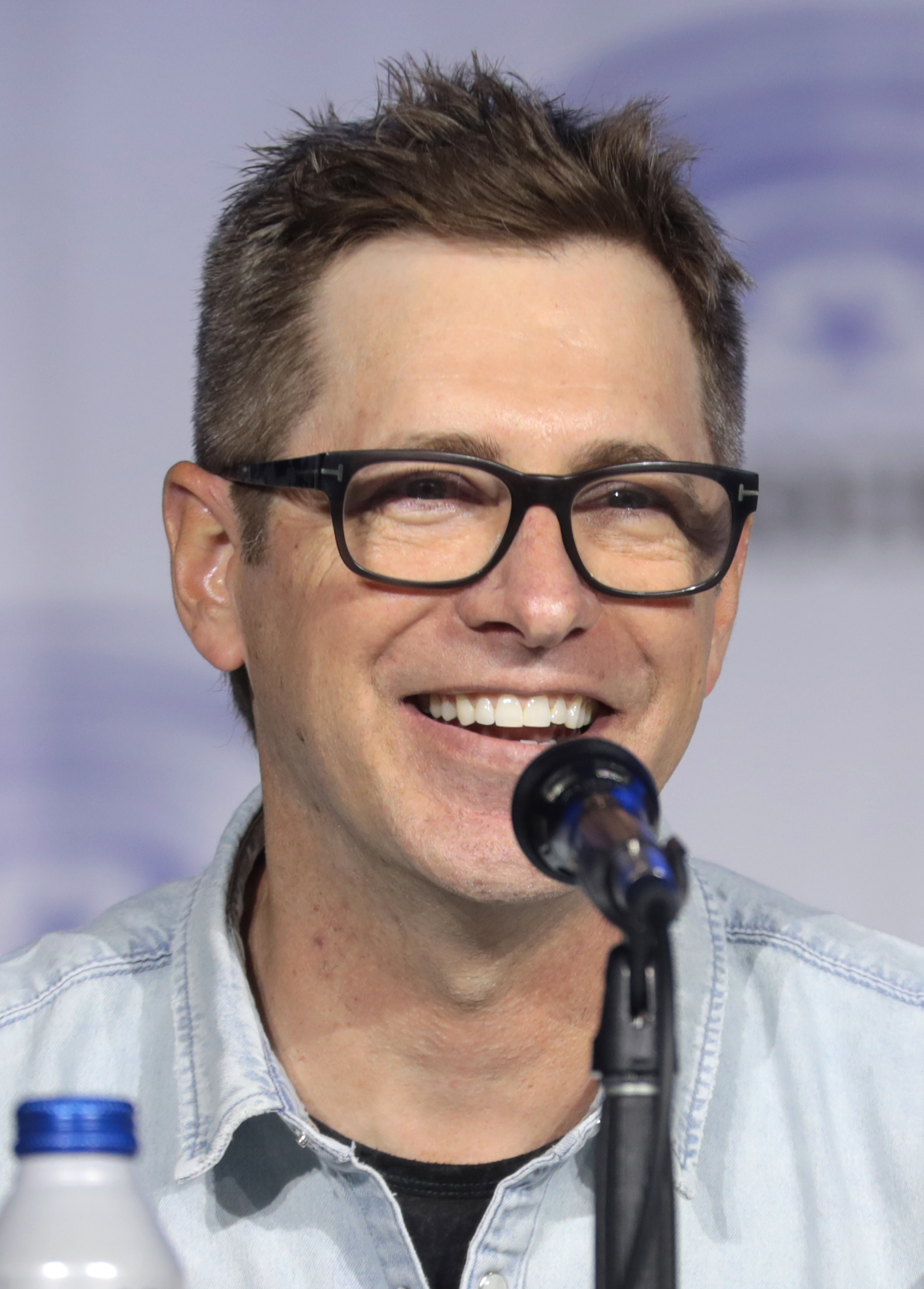
- Todd Helbing at the 2022 WonderCon
- Born: United States
- Occupations: Screenwriter; television producer

Aaron Helbing
- Born: United States
- Occupations: Screenwriter; television producer

Aaron Helbing and Todd Helbing are American sibling screenwriters who had formerly worked as a team. They are known for their work on the Starz series Spartacus and Black Sails, and for The CW superhero drama The Flash. They stopped writing together after Season 3 of The Flash, splitting into separate careers.

The Helbings are known for their ability to blend high-stakes drama with superhero tropes, often incorporating emotional depth into their characters while maintaining the action and spectacle expected from genre shows.

== Career ==
In 1999, Todd first got his start on the drama Melrose Place, where he served as an assistant production coordinator. He then had positions on such projects as Beverly Hills, 90210 and The Twilight Zone. He and his brother first worked together on the HBO series Carnivàle; Todd as an assistant production coordinator, and Aaron as a writers assistant.

Todd then spent 2009 as a script coordinator on Entourage, while Aaron worked on the cable dramas Saved and Brotherhood, also as a script coordinator. The first script the two co-wrote was for the Superman prequel series Smallville's season seven episode "Hero". They went on to write for such series as Mortal Kombat: Legacy, Halo 4: Forward Unto Dawn and The Mob Doctor. They served as supervising producers on the second season of the Starz drama Black Sails, writing the episode "XIII."

=== Spartacus ===
The duo wrote an episode ("Paterfamilias") of the Starz prequel mini-series Spartacus: Gods of the Arena, for which they also served as story editors. They then returned for the sequel series Spartacus: War of the Damned, again as story editors and writers, co-writing, in total, four episodes ("The Thing in the Pit", "Mark of the Brotherhood", "Libertus", "Wolves at the Gate").

Aaron is an executive producer of Spartacus: House of Ashur, which premiered December 5, 2025. In a review for The Hollywood Reporter, Angie Han wrote, "It's promising that House of Ashur seems to understand that if it's the NSFW pleasures that draw us in first, it's the growing attachment to these characters and their lives that will keep us on the hook."

=== The Flash ===
In Summer 2014, the brothers were hired as co-executive producers and writers on another DC Comics-produced CW series The Flash. The first episode they co-wrote, along with Brooke Eikmeier, is the freshman series' fifth installment, "Plastique". The episode introduces the titular supervillainess. The duo co-wrote the first midseason finale, "The Man in the Yellow Suit"; which delves into the mystery of the Reverse Flash. They co-wrote the series' twelfth installment, "Crazy for You". The episode introduces DC Comics character Linda Park, as Barry Allen's new love interest. The brothers co-wrote the series' pivotal 15th episode "Out of Time"; in which the supervillain Weather Wizard is introduced, and the Flash experiences time travel for the first time. Lastly, they wrote the 22nd installment of the show, "Rogue Air", which featured another crossover with Arrow.

With the commencement of the sophomore season, the brothers were named executive producers; first writing the second episode, "Flash of Two Worlds". It featured the introduction to Golden Age hero Jay Garrick/The Flash. The duo next wrote the seventh episode, "Gorilla Warfare", which featured Gorilla Grodd. Since then, the brothers wrote the episodes "The Reverse Flash Returns", "Flash Back", "The Race of his Life", the story of "Escape from Earth-2", the teleplay for "Legends of Today". They became showrunners during Season 2 and in Season 3, they wrote "Paradox", the teleplay for the first part of Invasion!, the story of "The Present", Aaron co-wrote the teleplay for "Attack on Gorilla City" and Todd wrote the story of "Attack on Central City", they wrote the teleplay for "Duet" and "Finish Line" - the Season 3 finale. Aaron stepped down as showrunner and Todd continued on - co-writing the teleplay of "The Flash Reborn", solely wrote the teleplay for the Flash part of Crisis on Earth-X and co-wrote "Enter Flashtime" and the season 4 finale "We are the Flash".

In 2017, Todd became the sole showrunner of The Flash during Season 4 after Andrew Kreisberg's firing, and continued to solely showrun the show for Season 5. In 2019, Todd stepped down as showrunner for Season 6, with writer Eric Wallace taking his place.

=== Post-split careers ===
On August 13, 2018, it was announced that History Channel's historical drama Knightfall was renewed for a second season, and Aaron Helbing had been hired as executive producer, writer and showrunner for the second season, replacing Dominic Minghella. The series was canceled in May 2020 after two seasons.

Todd Helbing would go on to write and produce the CW superhero drama television series Superman & Lois (2021–24), for which he was an executive producer and showrunner. Aaron Helbing later wrote the eighth episode of Season 3 of the series.
