= Glen Winter =

Canadian television director, cinematographer

- Other name: Glen Thomas Winter
- Occupations: Television director, cinematographer, producer
- Years active: 1994–present

Glen Winter is a Canadian television director, cinematographer, and producer who is well known for his work on The WB/The CW's Smallville and for his significant contributions to the Arrowverse.

== Career ==
Winter began his career as a filmloader on Mark Rydell's Intersection. He worked on several films as a camera operator, such as The Crow: Stairway To Heaven, MVP: Most Vertical Primate, and Air Bud: Seventh Inning Fetch. As a cinematographer, his work includes Stone of Destiny, Rags, and Dead Heat.

He serves as the director of the pilot episode of CBS' Supergirl, which premiered in late 2015. The series was developed by The New Normal co-creator Ali Adler, and Arrow and The Flash executive producers Andrew Kreisberg and Greg Berlanti. Winter has directed twelve episodes of the series.

=== Smallville ===
Winter had a mainstay position on the Superman prequel series Smallville, on which he first served as second unit director of photography, and then series cinematographer. He went on to direct 12 episodes, including "Cyborg", introducing the titular hero, "Fallout", "Crimson", "Blue", "Traveler", "Committed", and "Legion". He also did the first collaboration with DC Comics' Geoff Johns and introduced the titular group of heroes from the future; "Infamous", "Idol", featuring the Wonder Twins, the first part of the TV movie "Absolute Justice", "Hostage", and "Shield", showcasing the supervillain Deadshot.

=== Arrow, The Flash and Legends of Tomorrow ===
In Legends, we had a couple of complicated action sequences that we didn't have a lot of time to do. This is a part of the process that I actually really enjoy. You seemingly have something that is unshootable in the time and money, where you have to go, "Okay, how do we make this shootable and still make it dynamic?" I just break it down into variable chunks. I want to put the audience in the middle of the action. I try to think of a way to shoot each action beat within the scene so it's not necessarily always the same. I'll shoot one piece off a crane. I'll do one piece hand-to-hand. I'll do one piece off a camera car. I just see the movie in my head.

— Winter on his direction style of Legends of Tomorrow, and beyond.

In spring 2012, Winter signed on to another DC Comics produced series, Arrow. After starting as series cinematographer, he segued to episode directing. His first effort was written by frequent collaborator, and DC Comics CCO, Geoff Johns. Entitled "Dead to Rights", the installment was met with fan and critical acclaim. He went on to direct second-season episodes "Broken Dolls", "Blind Spot", and "The Promise".

He helmed Arrow's third-season premiere, "The Calm". He then directed the first episode of 2015, "Left Behind".

Starting with the fourth-season premiere, "Green Arrow", Winter was named a producer on Arrow.

He served as the director of photography on the pilot of Arrow's sister-series The Flash. He went on to direct the fourth episode, "Going Rogue", in which the supervillain Captain Cold is introduced. He next helmed the series' 8th installment, which features a crossover event with Arrow, "Flash vs. Arrow"; and the 13th "The Nuclear Man", featuring the exploration of the titular hero. During the latter portion of the season, he was named as producer.

In September 2015, it was confirmed that Winter would helm the pilot for the Arrow/Flash spin-off Legends of Tomorrow. The series focuses on a band of tag-team heroes and villains made up from the Arrowverse, traveling through space and time to stop the maniacal Vandal Savage. It was later confirmed that Winter would also serve as a producer on the series. Winter said of directing the two-part pilot episode that he was most proud of a technically challenging battle involving The Atom. "He flies out of [Martin] Stein's pocket. [The creators] write, "Atom basically comes in and shoots up the place." I'm like, "Oh, my god. How am I going to do that? What is that? What does that even look like?" I decided I didn't want to do it in a bunch of cuts. I wanted it to feel like one flowing, big piece. I shot it on the camera car. I shot it on high-res at 6k. We did it in one take."

== Credits ==
- Arrow / 1.16: "Dead to Rights", 2.03: "Broken Dolls", 2.11: "Blind Spot", 2.15: "The Promise", 3.01: "The Calm", 3.10: "Left Behind", 4.22: "Lost in the Flood", 7.12: "Emerald Archer" & 8.08: "Crisis on Infinite Earths, Part 4"
- The Flash / 1.04: "Going Rogue", 1.08: "Flash vs. Arrow", 1.13: "The Nuclear Man", 2.16: "Trajectory" & 4.01: "The Flash Reborn"
- Supergirl / 1.01: "Pilot", 1.02: "Stronger Together", 1.11: "Strange Visitor from Another Planet", 2.01: "The Adventures of Supergirl", 2.02: "The Last Children of Krypton", 2.05: "Crossfire", 2.07: "The Darkest Place", 2.22: "Nevertheless, She Persisted", 3.09: "Reign", 3.14: "Scott Through The Heart", 6.11: "Mxy in the Middle", and 6.19: "The Last Gauntlet"
- Legends of Tomorrow / 1.01: "Pilot Part 1", 1.02: "Pilot Part 2", 6.07: "Back To The Finale Part II" & 7.07: "A Woman's Place in a War Effort"
- Blindspot / 2.02: "Name Not One Men" & 3.06: "Adoring Suspect"
- Deception / 1.08: "Multiple Outs"
- Titans / 1.11: "Dick Grayson" & 2.15: "Aqualad"
- Doom Patrol / 1.01: "Pilot" & 2.05: "Finger Patrol"
- Prodigal Son / 1.13: "Wait & Hope"
- Stargirl / 1.01: "Pilot", 3.34 "Frenemies Chapter Seven: Infinity Inc. Part One" & 3.35 "Frenemies Chapter Eight: Infinity Inc. Part Two"
- The Flight Attendant / 1.05: "Other People's Houses"
- Batwoman / 2.12: "Intitate Self-Destruct" & 3.10: "Toxic"
- The Mysterious Benedict Society / 1.03: "Depends on the Wagon"
- The Winchesters / 1.01 "Pilot"
- Dead Boy Detectives / 1.02 "The Case of the Dandelion Shrine" & 1.06 "The Case of the Creeping Forest"
- The Hunting Party / 1.05 "Roy Barber" and 2.04 "Amanda Weiss"
- The Wayfinders / 1.01 “New Realm, Who Dis?”
