= Grainne Godfree =

American television writer

- Born: Los Angeles, California
- Occupation: Television writer
- Years active: 2007–present

Grainne Godfree is an American television writer. She is known for her work on The CW and Greg Berlanti's Arrowverse.

== Life and career ==
She attended Harvard University, graduating with a degree in history. She later entered the Columbia University film program and spent three years as the assistant director of the school's film festival.

Her first foray into show business was with the 2008 short film Anjali, which she wrote for director Maya Anand. It follows a rebellious Indian-American who is faced with the betrayal of her father.

=== The Tomorrow People ===
In 2013, she joined the American remake of the science-fiction series The Tomorrow People, as a writer. She contributed to four episodes of the series ("All Tomorrow's Parties", "The Citedel", "Brother's Keeper", "Modus Vivendi").

=== Arrowverse ===
In min-2014, Godfree was hired as a writer and story editor on The CW superhero series The Flash, part of the shared universe the Arrowverse. She first co-wrote, with Alison Schapker, the series' third episode, "Things You Can't Outrun"; which introduced Ronnie Raymond. She co-wrote, again with Schapker, the seventh episode, "Power Outage".

She and executive producer Marc Guggenheim co-wrote a teleplay, based on a story by co-creators Andrew Kreisberg and Greg Berlanti, for Arrow's eighth episode of its third season, "The Brave and the Bold". It featured a crossover with sister-series The Flash, and served as an introduction tale for DC Comics supervillain Captain Boomerang.

Next on The Flash, Wu Kai-yu and Brooke Eikmeier co-wrote a teleplay, based on a story by Godfree, for episode 16, "Rogue Time". She and Wu then co-scripted the eighteenth installment, "All Star Team Up"; which featured another crossover with Arrow, and the first teaming of the Flash and The Atom/Ray Palmer. The pair also wrote the twenty-first episode, "Grodd Lives", which featured the first full appearance of one of the Flash's foremost enemies, Gorilla Grodd.

At the start of the series' second season Godfree became executive story editor. Her first writing credit of the season came with the fifth episode, "The Darkness and the Light", which she co-wrote with consulting producer Ben Sokolowski. The episode introduced Doctor Light. She guest co-wrote the 10th episode of season 3, "Borrowing Problems from the Future", with story editor David Kob.

After the second season of The Flash completed, Godfree departed to focus fully on the spin-off series Legends of Tomorrow, as writer/consulting producer. During its first season, Godfree wrote exclusively with Arrow's Beth Schwartz, for episodes "Fail-Safe" and "Left Behind". At the start of season two, Godfree was promoted to producer, as Schwartz departed. Godfree first co-wrote the third episode of the season with showrunner Phil Klemmer, "Shogun", which featured the ancestral Yamashiro family and the origin of the Soultaker Sword. She and former Arrow writer Keto Shimizu co-wrote the fifth episode "Compromised", featuring a return to the 1980s Reagan administration. She and story editor Matthew Maala write "Turncoat", the eleventh episode of the season, revolving around the Legends traveling to 1776 to assist George Washington during the American Revolutionary War. Godfree scripted her first solo outing in her career with episode 14, "Moonshot".

=== Marvel Cinematic Universe ===
Godfree wrote the fifth episode of Daredevil: Born Again season 1, "With Interest."
