= Brooke Roberts =

American television and comic-book writer

- Other names: Brooke Eikmeier
- Occupations: Television and comic book writer
- Years active: 2001 - present

Brooke Roberts is an American television and comic book writer.

She is known for her work on the ABC legal drama Boston Legal and for The CW's superhero series The Flash.

== Life and career ==
She lived in France as a teenager.

Roberts served in the US Army as a cryptologic linguist in the Arabic language. She received an honorable discharge in September 2013.

Her first foray into show business was on the NBC sitcom Inside Schwartz, as a writers' assistant. Roberts went on to serve as an assistant to the writers of such series as 3-South, The Bernie Mac Show, Love, Inc., Family Guy and Boston Legal.

Her first television script was co-written, with Sanford Golden and Karen Wyscarver, for the Boston Legal episode "Tea and Sympathy".

=== Alice in Arabia ===
In March 2014, Eikmeier was embroiled in a controversy with her ABC Family pilot Alice in Arabia, which depicted the story of an American girl being swept from her status quo and placed with her extended family in Arabia. Days after ordering the drama to pilot, ABC Family rescinded it, claiming public backlash, due to the nature of the series' synopsis. Eikmeier wrote a comprehensive open letter to The Hollywood Reporter, stating that the public's perception had been misled by the network released statement. The series was shopped to other networks, with no apparent bidders.

=== The Flash ===
In summer 2014, Eikmeier was hired as a writer on The CW series The Flash. Her first episode contribution was with the series' fifth installment, "Plastique", which she co-wrote with co-executive producers Aaron and Todd Helbing. The episode features the first appearance of the titular villainess. Eikmeier and Ben Sokolowski co-wrote the teleplay, based on a story by co-developers Greg Berlanti and Andrew Kreisberg, of the series' eighth episode, "Flash vs. Arrow". It showcased a crossover with sister series, Arrow. She co-penned the 11th episode of the first season, "The Sound and the Fury", with consulting producer Alison Schapker. The installment showcased the introduction of rogue supervillain The Pied Piper. Eikmeier co-wrote a teleplay, with Kai Yu Wu, based on a story by story editor Grainne Godfree for the sixteenth episode, "Rogue Time". She re-teamed with Schapker for the first seasons' twentieth episode, "The Trap".

She, along with Katherine Walczak and Kreisberg, wrote the prequel comic book series The Flash: Season Zero, from September 2014 to January 2015.

Roberts was promoted to story editor in season two. She first co-wrote the season's sixth episode, "Enter Zoom"; along with executive producer Gabrielle Stanton, then co-wrote the 12th installment, "Fast Lane", with Kai Yu Wu and Joe Peracchio.
