= The Flash (2014 TV series) =

American superhero television series

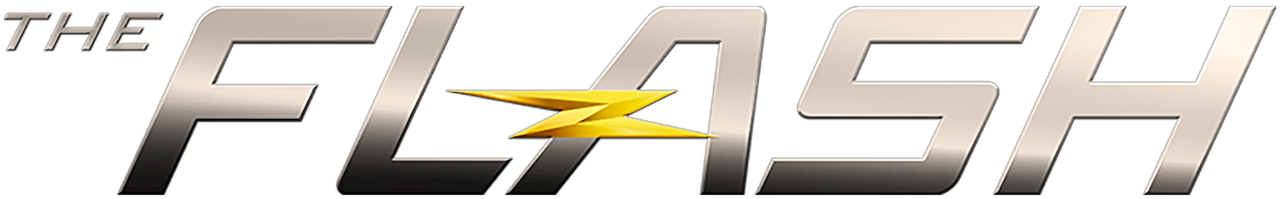
- Genre: Superhero; Drama; Action
- Based on: Characters from DC Comics
- Developed by: Greg Berlanti; Andrew Kreisberg; Geoff Johns
- Showrunners: Andrew Kreisberg; Gabrielle Stanton; Aaron Helbing; Todd Helbing; Eric Wallace
- Starring: Grant Gustin; Candice Patton; Danielle Panabaker; Rick Cosnett; Carlos Valdes; Tom Cavanagh; Jesse L. Martin; Keiynan Lonsdale; Neil Sandilands; Hartley Sawyer; Danielle Nicolet; Jessica Parker Kennedy; Chris Klein; LaMonica Garrett; Efrat Dor; Kayla Compton; Brandon McKnight; Jon Cor
- Composers: Blake Neely; Nathaniel Blume
- Country of origin: United States
- Original language: English
- No. of seasons: 9
- No. of episodes: 184 (list of episodes)

Production
- Executive producers: David Nutter; Gabrielle Stanton; Sarah Schechter; Aaron Helbing; Todd Helbing; Andrew Kreisberg; Greg Berlanti; Eric Wallace; Gabriel Garza; Jonathan Butler; Sam Chalsen
- Producers: J.P. Finn; Emily Silver; Jennifer Lence; Carl Ogawa; Geoff Garrett; Brooke Roberts; Dermott Downs; Glen Winter; Judalina Neira
- Production location: Vancouver, British Columbia
- Cinematography: Glen Winter; C. Kim Miles; Jeffrey C. Mygatt; Stewart Whelan; Brenton Spencer
- Editors: Paul Karasick; Harry Jierjian; Nathan Draper; Chris Conlee; Dan Wilken; Felicia Livingston; Derek Stricker
- Camera setup: Single-camera
- Running time: 41–45 minutes
- Production companies: Bonanza Productions; Berlanti Productions; DC Entertainment; Warner Bros. Television

Original release
- Network: The CW
- Release: October 7, 2014 – May 24, 2023

Related
- Arrowverse

The Flash is an American superhero television series developed by Greg Berlanti, Andrew Kreisberg, and Geoff Johns, airing on The CW. It is based on the Barry Allen incarnation of DC Comics character the Flash, a costumed superhero crime-fighter with the power to move at superhuman speeds. It is a spin-off of Arrow, existing in the same fictional universe known as the Arrowverse. The series premiered in the United States on The CW on October 7, 2014, and ran for nine seasons until May 24, 2023. The series follows Barry Allen, portrayed by Grant Gustin, a crime scene investigator who gains super-human speed, which he uses to fight criminals, along with others who have also gained superhuman abilities.

Initially envisioned as a backdoor pilot, the positive reception Gustin received during two appearances as Barry on Arrow led to executives choosing to develop a full pilot to make use of a larger budget and help flesh out Barry's world in more detail. The series is primarily filmed in Vancouver, British Columbia, Canada.

The Flash's premiere on October 7, 2014 became the second-most watched pilot in the history of The CW, after The Vampire Diaries in 2009. It has been well received by critics and audiences, but became more mixed as the series went on. It also won the People's Choice Award for "Favorite New TV Drama" in 2014. The series, together with Arrow, has spun characters out to their own show, Legends of Tomorrow, which premiered on January 21, 2016.

== Series overview ==
The first season follows Barry Allen, a crime-scene investigator who gains superhuman speed from the explosion of the S.T.A.R. Labs' particle accelerator and becomes the costumed superhero the Flash. He uses his new powers to fight criminals along with other metahumans who have also gained superhuman abilities in Central City. Barry eventually discovers that his mentor Harrison Wells is actually Eobard Thawne–the Reverse-Flash–his archenemy from the future who traveled back in time to murder his mother, Nora Allen, when he was a child. Thawne is ultimately erased from existence when his ancestor Eddie sacrifices himself, causing a singularity to form in the process.

In the second season, the singularity brings the speedster Zoom from a parallel universe of Earth-2, who seeks to eliminate all other speedsters in the multiverse where Barry meets his father Henry Allen's Earth-3 counterpart Jay Garrick. After Zoom kills Barry's father, Barry defeats Zoom and travels back in time to save his mother's life.

In the third season, Barry creates the alternate timeline "Flashpoint" following his decision to change his past. He is able to partially restore the timeline, but causes the emergence of Savitar, a god-like speedster with a grudge against Barry. When Barry accidentally travels to the future and sees Iris West killed by Savitar, he becomes desperate to change the future to prevent that from happening. After saving Iris and defeating Savitar, Barry takes his place in the Speed Force in order to repent for his creation of Flashpoint.

The fourth season sees the team successfully bring Barry back from the Speed Force, but in the process release dark matter that turns a dozen people on a city bus into metahumans, masterminded by Clifford DeVoe, an adversary with the fastest mind alive. After the defeat of DeVoe, the team is approached by Barry and Iris' daughter from the future Nora West-Allen.

During the fifth season, the team discover that Nora's presence has altered the timeline and unleashed Cicada, a serial killer bent on killing metahumans, as well as the aftermath of thwarting Thinker's plot causing ordinary items to be imbued with dark matter that turns them into Meta-Tech. They also eventually learn of her allegiance with an imprisoned Eobard, who orchestrated Nora's arrival and previously trained her when it came to her fight with Godspeed. Barry and Nora succeed in subduing an escaped Eobard, but are forced to let him go and Nora is erased from the timeline.

In the sixth season, Barry and Iris learn that the crisis in which Barry disappears has moved up to December 2019, and that in order to save billions, the Flash must die. Meanwhile, Ramsey Rosso discovers a way to cure people through dark matter, only to turn himself into a metahuman with a violent bloodthirst. Following Rosso's defeat, Barry surviving Crisis, and the multiverse's destruction and rebirth, the team navigates the world post-Crisis all while the secret organization Black Hole and quantum engineer Eva McCulloch, who is trapped in the Mirror Dimension, move forward with their mysterious plans. Eva captures Iris, Kamila, and Captain Singh and imprisons them in Mirror Dimension while their mirror duplicates hinder Team Flash.

In the seventh season, Team Flash defeats Eva and creates a new Speed Force while Iris, Kamilla, and Singh escape the Mirror Dimension. As a side effect of Eva's attacks, Caitlin and Frost are separated into different bodies. Later, Team Flash contends with the birth of the Strength Force, the Sage Force, and the Still Force. Afterwards, Team Flash gets caught up in the Godspeed War, in which Barry is reunited with his future daughter Nora and meets his future son Bart Allen. Barry briefly allies with a reconstituted Thawne in order to defeat Godspeed, and afterwards, Thawne gets away vowing to become faster than Barry.

The eighth season opens with the five-part event "Armageddon". Thawne causes Barry to be targeted by Despero, who claims that Barry will destroy the Earth in 2031. Later, Barry enters Thawne's "Reverse-Flashpoint" timeline, where he was Flash and Barry was Reverse-Flash. With help from Damien Darhk, Barry restores the original timeline, prevents Joe's death, and spares Thawne from his erasure by removing his speed. Later, Team Flash fights Deathstorm, whose defeat comes at the cost of Frost's life, devastating her boyfriend Chillblaine. Barry also encounters Meena Dhawan, who has gained super-speed with help from a revived time remnant of Thawne. They contend with the newly-born negative counterparts of the Strength, Sage, and Still Force, who use Iris to revive Thawne in his time remnant's body, but are then defeated, with Thawne being removed from the timeline.

The ninth and final season opens with Team Flash joining forces with former enemies in order to defeat the Red Death, who is later revealed to be Ryan Wilder from an alternate Earth. Later, Rosso returns to infect the newly-recreated multiverse, but Barry stops him with help from Oliver Queen, John Diggle, and Wally West. After this, Eddie, who had been mysteriously resurrected with false memories, is chosen as the new avatar for the Negative Speed Force, becoming the speedster Cobalt Blue. Bringing Eobard, Zoom, Savitar, and Godspeed back with him, Eddie fights against Team Flash, but ultimately stands down and forms a truce with Barry. The series ends with Nora's birth, and Barry choosing Avery Ho, Max Mercury, and Jess Chambers to become new speedsters.

== Episodes ==
The Flash series overview
Season	Episodes	Originally released		Rank	Average viewership (in millions)
Season	Episodes	First released	Last released	Rank	Average viewership (in millions)
1	23	October 7, 2014	May 19, 2015	118	4.62
2	23	October 6, 2015	May 24, 2016	112	4.25
3	23	October 4, 2016	May 23, 2017	120	3.50
4	23	October 10, 2017	May 22, 2018	151	3.04
5	22	October 9, 2018	May 14, 2019	153	2.43
6	19	October 8, 2019	May 12, 2020	113	2.23
7	18	March 2, 2021	July 20, 2021	132	1.58
8	20	November 16, 2021	June 29, 2022	122	1.04
9	13	February 8, 2023	May 24, 2023	114	0.86

== Cast and characters ==
- Grant Gustin as Barry Allen / The Flash:
  A Central City assistant police forensic investigator. Moments after an explosion at the S.T.A.R. Labs particle accelerator, Barry is struck by lightning in his laboratory and doused by chemicals affected by the accident. When he awakens from a nine-month coma, he has superhuman speed. In September 2013, Grant Gustin was cast in the titular role. Andy Mientus, who would eventually be cast as Hartley Rathaway, also auditioned for the role. Gustin began researching the character during the audition process, and reading as many comics as possible. Gustin primarily focused on The New 52 series of comics, because he knew it would be difficult to read everything and he felt the New 52 was the closest to the show's "look and feel".
- Candice Patton as Iris West-Allen: The daughter of Joe West, sister to Wally West, and eventually Barry Allen's wife, getting engaged in "Duet" and marrying during the Arrowverse crossover "Crisis on Earth-X". She initially works at Central City Picture News as a journalist, and eventually establishes her own newspaper, The Central City Citizen.
- Danielle Panabaker as Caitlin Snow / Killer Frost / Frost / Khione:
  A highly intelligent bioengineering expert, Caitlin believed her fiancé, Ronnie Raymond, was killed during the particle accelerator explosion at S.T.A.R. Labs, until he returned part way through first season. Ronnie and Caitlin get married in the first season finale "Fast Enough". She is also a metahuman with cryokinetic abilities known as Killer Frost and later Frost, and later also gains a persona, Khione, that allows her to connect to the natural world.
- Rick Cosnett as Eddie Thawne / "Malcolm Gilmore" / Cobalt Blue (season 1; recurring: season 9; guest: seasons 2–3 & 8):
  A CCPD detective who transferred from Keystone City, who works as Joe's partner and Iris' boyfriend. Although initially seeing the Flash as a menace, he later comes to be a close ally. After learning he is the ancestor of Eobard Thawne–the Reverse-Flash, Eddie commits suicide to wipe him from existence. Years later, Eddie is mysteriously resurrected, and is given a false life and memories as Malcolm Gilmore. When Eddie remembers his real identity and comes to terms with the changes that have occurred since his suicide attempt, including Eobard surviving and Iris marrying Barry, Eddie is chosen as the new avatar for the Negative Speed Force, becoming the speedster Cobalt Blue in the process. He fights team Flash, but eventually stands down and forms a truce with Barry.
- Carlos Valdes as Cisco Ramon / Vibe / Mecha-Vibe (seasons 1–7):
  A mechanical engineering genius, Cisco is the youngest member of the team of scientists at S.T.A.R. Labs and is a former metahuman who had the power to "vibe" a person's location and was able to travel across the multiverse. He leaves the team during the seventh season to move to Star City with his girlfriend Kamila for a job at A.R.G.U.S., but returns to help team Flash one more time in the season finale.
- Tom Cavanagh as Eobard Thawne / Reverse-Flash (seasons 1–6; recurring: season 8; guest: season 7 & 9) and Harrison Wells (seasons 1–7; guest: season 9):
  The mind and money behind the S.T.A.R. Labs' Particle Accelerator who becomes a pariah after his device implodes and creates a large number of metahumans in Central City. Wells mentors Barry and helps to increase his speed. He is eventually revealed to be Eddie Thawne's time-traveling descendant and the Flash's archenemy from the future, Eobard Thawne–the Reverse-Flash. Eobard murdered the real Wells and assumed his identity. In subsequent seasons, Cavanagh also portrays various doppelgängers of Wells from alternate realities, including the sarcastic but brilliant "Harry" from Earth-2; sci-fi novelist "H.R." from Earth-19; keen detective "Sherloque" from Earth-221; and adventurous geologist "Nash".
- Jesse L. Martin as Joe West (seasons 1–8; recurring: season 9):
  A police detective who acts as a surrogate father to Barry, taking him into his home after Barry's mother is murdered and his father is unjustly imprisoned for the crime. Joe is the father of Iris and Wally. He also now has a daughter with his fiancée, district attorney Cecille Horton, named Jenna West. Martin took a medical leave of absence from the show during season five after suffering a back injury.
- Keiynan Lonsdale as Wally West / Kid Flash (seasons 2–4; guest: seasons 5–6 & 9):
  The son of Joe and brother of Iris, born without their knowledge after his mother left Central City. The producers disliked the introduction of relatives of characters that were never previously mentioned, feeling it was "weird", and opted instead to introduce Wally as unknown even to his relatives. They also chose to make him Iris' brother, a departure from the comics, where he was her nephew. Explaining Lonsdale's casting, Kreisberg said, "Just like when we met Grant [Gustin] for the first time, we instantly knew Keiynan embodied all the heart and courage of a hero." After Flashpoint, Wally eventually gets speed powers from Doctor Alchemy and becomes Kid Flash. In season four, he leaves Central City to break out of Barry's shadow, and during that time he joins the Legends. He returns home briefly following the birth of half-sister Jenna West, and to confront Barry when problems with the Speed Force surface.
- Neil Sandilands as Clifford DeVoe / The Thinker (season 4):
  A metahuman with superhuman intelligence. Originally a mild-mannered professor who dreamed of expanding the way people think, DeVoe allows his power to go to his head and seeks to fix all that he deems wrong with humanity as the Thinker; his methods include creating new metahumans to hunt and steal their powers, and framing Barry for murder. His control-freak, power-hungry ways eventually turn his wife Marlize against him, and she eventually helps team Flash wipe him from existence.
- Hartley Sawyer as Ralph Dibny / Elongated Man (seasons 5–6; recurring: season 4):
  A private investigator, formerly a corrupt CCPD cop, Dibny is a metahuman with superpowers including body elasticity and malleability. He becomes a member of Team Flash. After defeating Mirror Monarch, Dibny left Central City with Sue Dearbon to hunt down other criminal organizations. This was written into the show following Sawyer's firing from the series in June 2020 prior to the start of production of the seventh season due to racist, misogynistic tweets he made in the past resurfacing.
- Danielle Nicolet as Cecile Horton / Virtue (seasons 5–9; recurring: seasons 3–4; guest: season 1):
  A district attorney who becomes Joe West's girlfriend and the mother of their daughter Jenna West. While pregnant, she experiences temporary telepathic metahuman superpowers. After her pregnancy, she develops new metahuman abilities of empathy.
- Jessica Parker Kennedy as Nora West-Allen / XS (season 5; recurring: seasons 4 & 7–8; guest: season 9):
  A mysterious girl with super-speed powers, who is eventually revealed to be Barry and Iris' future daughter. She arrives in the future with the help of Eobard Thawne to help take on Cicada, a metahuman who hates and aims to exterminate all other metas. She eventually is erased from existence after the source of Cicada's powers was destroyed. A different version of Nora appears starting with the seventh season, assisting her father in the Godspeed war and later Thawne's re-emergence.
- Chris Klein as Orlin Dwyer / Cicada (season 5):
  A metahuman who hates and aims to exterminate all other metas. Developing his powers and views after separate meta incidents that also kill his sister and injure his niece Grace, Cicada initially aims to kill all metahumans, including eventually himself. He eventually gives this and his powers up after learning of Grace's meta status, but is later killed by a future version of Grace who had embraced his old views, although a part of him survives long enough to help avert this future by convincing present-day Grace.
- LaMonica Garrett as Mar Novu / Monitor (season 6; guest: season 5): a multiversal being testing different Earths in the multiverse in preparation for an impending "crisis". He made his first appearance in the Arrowverse crossover "Elseworlds".
  - Garrett also portrays Mobius / Anti-Monitor (season 6), the Monitor's polar opposite, an evil being dedicated to ending the multiverse.
- Efrat Dor as Eva McCulloch / Mirror Monarch (seasons 6–7):
  A quantum engineer and co-founder of McCulloch Technologies who was seemingly trapped in the Mirrorverse for six years after a particle accelerator explosion. After discovering her husband has perverted her company and technology to create the criminal organization Black Hole, she seeks to escape and get revenge, kidnapping Iris, Kamila, and Chief Singh and replacing them with mirror duplicates in order to secure the resources to escape safely. After doing so, she kills her husband, destroys Black Hole's resources and takes back her company. Shortly afterwards, it is revealed that the present Eva is actually a mirror copy and the real Eva perished in the particle accelerator explosion. Upon learning the truth, she tries to replace everyone in Central City with duplicates to bring them down to her level. Flash and Iris persuade her to give up on her plans and after destroying the duplicates with their help and returning all the people, she leaves for the Mirrorverse again to start anew.
- Kayla Compton as Allegra Garcia (seasons 7–9; recurring: season 6):
  A young metahuman with electromagnetic abilities and aspiring reporter.
- Brandon McKnight as Chester P. Runk (seasons 7–9; guest: season 6):
  A scientist who was rescued by Team Flash from his own experiment and now aids them while rebuilding his life.
- Jon Cor as Mark Blaine / Chillblaine (season 9; recurring: season 7–8):
  A former cryogenicist-turned-criminal who becomes a rival and love interest for Frost.

== Production ==
=== Development ===
On July 30, 2013, it was announced that Arrow co-creators Greg Berlanti and Andrew Kreisberg, Arrow pilot director David Nutter, and DC Comics CCO Geoff Johns would develop a television series based on the Flash for The CW, and it would detail Barry Allen's origin. Kreisberg revealed after the announcement that Allen would first appear as a recurring character on Arrow in three episodes of season two—all written by Berlanti, Kreisberg and Johns—and the last of the episodes would act as a backdoor pilot for the new show. Kreisberg added that Allen would be a forensic scientist and the introduction of his superpowers, as well as the reactions to this, will be very human and grounded. Johns stated that the character of the Flash in the show would resemble his comic book counterpart, complete with his trademark red costume, and not be a poor imitation. Kreisberg elaborated: "No sweat suits or strange code names; he will be The Flash." While researching the best way to depict the Flash's lightning speed, Johns stated it would not just be the standard "blurring around".

Barry ultimately appeared twice in Arrow's second season, with the planned backdoor pilot cancelled in favor of a traditional pilot by The CW executives, who had been impressed by early cuts of Barry's first two episodes on Arrow. This allowed the creative team to flesh out Barry's story and his world on a bigger budget, as opposed to a backdoor pilot's constraint of incorporating characters from the parent show. The pilot was officially ordered on January 29, 2014, and was written by Berlanti, Kreisberg, and Johns, and directed by Nutter. On May 8, 2014, The Flash was officially picked up as a series, with an initial order of 13 episodes. Three more scripts were ordered in September 2014 following a positive response to newly completed episodes by executives, while a back ten was ordered the next month for a full 23-episode season.

With the commencement of production on the series' second season, former Arrow and Ugly Betty writer Gabrielle Stanton was promoted to executive producer and showrunner; after having served as consulting producer and writer on the first season's finale "Fast Enough". However, it was later reported that Kreisberg would be returning to sole showrunner duties at an unspecified time. That time was later proved to be at the start of 2016, "Potential Energy", when Stanton was no longer credited as being involved with the show. In May 2017, it was reported that Aaron Helbing would be departing the series. Helbing had served as a writer since the first season, and as co-showrunner, along with his brother Todd and Kreisberg, since the second. In 2019, Todd departed as showrunner, and Eric Wallace, who had been co-executive producer since the fourth season, was promoted to the sole showrunner, effective from season six.

On April 2, 2018, The CW renewed the series for a fifth season, which premiered on October 9, 2018. On January 31, 2019, The CW renewed the series for a sixth season, which premiered on October 8, 2019. On January 7, 2020, the series was renewed for a seventh season, which premiered on March 2, 2021. In April 2020, Gustin, who had been contracted for seven seasons, said there had been discussions about renewing the series through a ninth season, but those were stalled due to the COVID-19 pandemic. On February 3, 2021, the series was renewed for an eighth season which premiered on November 16, 2021. In late January 2022, Gustin was reported to be renewing his contract for a ninth season. On March 22, 2022, The CW renewed the series for a ninth season. On August 1, 2022, it was announced that the series will be concluding with its upcoming ninth season, and that the season would receive a 13-episode order. The season premiered on February 8, 2023, with the finale airing on May 24 of the same year.

=== Design ===
The costume was designed by Colleen Atwood, who also designed the costumes for Arrow. It features a burgundy color scheme, a masked helmet, and gold accents throughout, and went through multiple adjustments from the moment it was placed in computer renderings to the day of filming the pilot. Primarily made of leather, the suit contains areas with a stretchable material to allow Gustin room to bend. According to Atwood "It was all about a costume that could sell speed, Grant [Gustin] was continually moving in the suit, so it had to be designed to make that all happen visually and functionally." It initially took Gustin approximately 40 minutes to get into his costume, as the first cowl was prosthetic and had to be zipped and glued to his face. This was cut down to approximately 15 minutes by episode eight, when designers were able to develop a new cowl that easily slid over Gustin's face and locked into place. Maya Mani replaced Atwood as the costume designer for the second season and made slight changes to the Flash costume, such as changing the color of his crest from yellow to white, being faithful to the Flash costume from the comics. This same costume was used for the entirety of the third season.

The main costume was redesigned for the fourth season. The new costume had a brighter color scheme, more gold accents throughout, gold earpieces, and lightning bolts on the arms and legs. The suit also featured a gold lightning belt. The costume was yet again redesigned for the shows fifth season, with the cowl's chinstrap and the suits' gold accents being removed.

=== Filming ===
Production on the pilot began in March 2014, with filming taking place in Vancouver, British Columbia; additional filming for the series takes place in Portland, Oregon. On how action sequences are shot for the series, compared to Arrow, Gustin said, "When [Arrow] shoot[s] action sequences, pretty much what you see is what you get and they're really doing everything. We do a lot of plate shots that are empty shots of the area we're going to be in and then they're putting us in later in post. I do a lot of the fighting. I don't have to do it full speed and then they ramp it up and a lot of people have to freeze and I keep moving. Then I have to clear frame and step back into frame. It's really tedious stuff that we have to do. On theirs, they learn fight choreography and they shoot it from the perfect angles and what you see is what you get." Production on the third season began in early July 2016. On March 13, 2020, production on the sixth season was shut down due to the COVID-19 pandemic. Season seven began filming in October 2020 and concluded on May 19, 2021.

=== Music ===
Arrow composer Blake Neely is the primary composer of the series, and was first hired in April 2014 to score the pilot. He had previously composed a theme for Barry Allen which was featured in Arrow's season two episodes "The Scientist" and "Three Ghosts". The theme was titled "The Scientist" when it was released on the Arrow: Season 2 soundtrack. According to Neely, "It had to be different [from Arrow]... but it also couldn't be so different that it couldn't fit in the Arrow universe,... it had to be in a style that could hold hands with Arrow." On December 18, 2014, WaterTower Music released a selection of music from The Flash/Arrow crossover episodes, as well as two bonus tracks from their respective 2014 midseason finales. The first season, two-disc soundtrack was released on October 16, 2015. The second season's soundtrack was released digitally on July 22, 2016, and in CD format on July 26, 2016. Season 3 saw two soundtrack releases. The first was for the episode "Duet", which featured six songs from the episode and a guitar version of the last song "Running Home to You". It was released on March 21, 2017. The overall soundtrack was released on October 10, 2017. The score of the "Crisis on Earth-X" crossover released on June 15, 2018, and the season four soundtrack was released on March 15, 2019. The soundtracks for seasons five and six, and of the crossovers "Elseworlds" and "Crisis on Infinite Earths", were not released until February 26 and March 5, 2021, ahead of the seventh season's premiere. A soundtrack for the five-episode "Armageddon" event that began the show's eighth season was released on March 4, 2022. A soundtrack for the last three seasons was released on May 26, 2023.

=== Sound design ===
The sound design for the series is handled by Mark Camperell. The sound effect for Barry is made up of elements of thunder, electricity, jets, fireballs, and various custom whooshes and impacts. Speaking about designing the sound for the Flash's ability, Mark says: "My approach for the sounds of the Flash's ability was to editorially treat him like a really aggressively driven hot rod. This doesn't mean that I used car sounds for him, though. What I mean is that when thinking about how to edit his sounds, I thought about it like cutting a car chase."

== Release ==
=== Broadcast ===
The Flash was screened at the Warner Bros. Television and DC Entertainment panel at San Diego Comic-Con in July 2014. The series officially premiered on The CW on October 7, 2014, during the 2014–15 television season and also premiered in Canada on the same night. The second episode was screened at New York Comic Con on October 9, 2014, as a way to repay the viewers that watched the series' premiere episode. The series premiered in the United Kingdom and Ireland on October 28, 2014, and in Australia on December 3, 2014.

=== Home media ===
The complete first season was first released on Blu-ray and DVD in Region 1 on September 22, 2015, the second season on September 6, 2016, the third season on September 5, 2017, the fourth season on August 28, 2018, and the fifth season on August 27, 2019. Each season release contains additional features, which include: making-of featurettes, episode commentaries, deleted scenes, gag reels, and Comic-Con panels. The second, fourth and fifth season boxsets include the Arrowverse crossover episodes from the other connected television series, as well as commentary on those episodes. On Netflix in the United States, the first season became available for streaming on October 6, 2015, the second season on October 4, 2016, the third season on May 31, 2017, the fourth season on May 30, 2018, and the fifth season on May 22, 2019. In India, the series streamed on Hotstar due to a partnership between them and Hooq; it dissolved in April 2020 after Hooq shut down due to bankruptcy. The last episode of the series to stream on Hotstar was "Death of the Speed Force" in mid-March. And in the same year, StarzPlay also acquired the series' streaming rights in Middle East & North Africa. A year later, Amazon Prime Video acquired the streaming rights for India, with the series premiering there on May 24, 2021.

== Reception ==
=== Ratings ===
Viewership and ratings per season of The Flash
Season	Timeslot (ET)	Episodes	First aired		Last aired		TV season	Viewership rank	Avg. viewers (millions)	18–49 rank	Avg. 18–49 rating
Season	Timeslot (ET)	Episodes	Date	Viewers (millions)	Date	Viewers (millions)	TV season	Viewership rank	Avg. viewers (millions)	18–49 rank	Avg. 18–49 rating
1	Tuesday 8:00 p.m.	23	October 7, 2014	4.83	May 19, 2015	3.87	2014–15	118	4.62	90	1.7
2	Tuesday 8:00 p.m.	23	October 6, 2015	3.58	May 24, 2016	3.35	2015–16	112	4.25	69	1.7
3	Tuesday 8:00 p.m.	23	October 4, 2016	3.17	May 23, 2017	3.04	2016–17	120	3.50	78	1.4
4	Tuesday 8:00 p.m.	23	October 10, 2017	2.84	May 22, 2018	2.16	2017–18	151	3.05	97	1.1
5	Tuesday 8:00 p.m.	22	October 9, 2018	2.08	May 14, 2019	1.53	2018–19	153	2.43	102	0.9
6	Tuesday 8:00 p.m.	19	October 8, 2019	1.62	May 11, 2020	1.08	2019–20	113	2.23	90	0.8
7	Tuesday 8:00 p.m.	18	March 2, 2021	1.00	July 20, 2021	0.70	2020–21	132	1.58	108	0.5
8	Tuesday 8:00 p.m. (1–5); Wednesday 8:00 p.m. (6–18)	20	November 16, 2021	0.75	June 29, 2022	0.56	2021–22	122	1.04	111	0.3
9	Wednesday 8:00 p.m	13	February 8, 2023	0.51	May 24, 2023	0.46	2022–23	114	0.86	113	0.18

The first episode of The Flash was watched by 4.8 million viewers and had a 1.9 18–49 demographic rating, making it The CW's most watched and highest rated series premiere since The Vampire Diaries in 2009. Factoring Live + 7 day ratings, the pilot was watched by a total of 6.8 million viewers, becoming The CW's most-watched telecast and the highest-rated premiere among men 18–34 (2.5 rating). It broke the previous record for the most-watched telecast held by the cycle 8 finale of America's Next Top Model in 2007 (6.69 million). Additionally, across all platforms, including initiated streams on digital platforms and total unduplicated viewers on-air over two airings the week of October 7, 2014, the premiere was seen more than 13 million times.

The Canadian premiere was watched by 3.11 million viewers, making it the most-watched broadcast that night and the second for that week. In the United Kingdom, the premiere was the fourth highest-rated broadcast of the week and the eleventh of that month, with 1.53 million viewers. The timeshifted version got 82,000 viewers. The premiere in Australia was the most-watched broadcast on pay television, with 129,000 viewers tuning in.

In 2016, according to an analysis from Parrot Analytics, which used ratings data (where available), peer-to-peer sharing, social media chatter, and other factors to estimate viewer demand for various shows, The Flash was the 5th most popular show in the world with 3.1 million demand expressions per day, behind Game of Thrones, The Walking Dead, Pretty Little Liars, and Westworld. TorrentFreak also gauged The Flash as the fourth most-torrented television show of 2016.

=== Critical response ===
Critical response of The Flash
Season	Rotten Tomatoes	Metacritic
1	92% (63 reviews)	73 (27 reviews)
2	94% (23 reviews)	81 (4 reviews)
3	85% (23 reviews)	80 (4 reviews)
4	80% (19 reviews)	—N/a
5	94% (11 reviews)	—N/a
6	85% (5 reviews)	—N/a
7	95% (25 reviews)	—N/a

The review aggregator website Rotten Tomatoes gave the first season a 92% approval rating with an average rating of 7.75/10 based on 63 reviews. The website's consensus reads, "The Flash benefits from its purposefully light atmosphere, making it a superhero show uniquely geared toward genre fans as well as novices." Metacritic, which uses a weighted average, assigned a score of 73 out of 100, based on 27 reviews, indicating "generally favorable reviews". IGN's Eric Goldman and Joshua Yehl praised the show's premise and cast after viewing a press screening copy of the pilot. Goldman and Yehl favorably compared it to Arrow, stating that The Flash progresses with a confidence that Arrow did not get until later in the series. Reviews for the series became increasingly positive as the season progressed, with the finale receiving critical acclaim. Noel Murray of The A.V. Club gave the season a B+ overall, giving praise to the pacing of the plot, the performances of the cast and the special effects, and also pointing out the series' boldness to embrace its comic book influences, something that conventional superhero shows tend not to do. Weekly episode reviewer Scott Von Doviak gave consistently high ratings to the season and awarded the season finale a perfect A grade, calling the episode "richly satisfying" and also commending the show for "[capturing] the essence of its source material in a fun, light-on-its-feet way that few other comic book adaptations have managed." He also gave high praise to the emotional value and performances of the cast, as well as the cliffhanger and multiple easter eggs found in the episode. The second season of The Flash scored a Metacritic rating of 81 out of 100 indicating "universal acclaim".

=== Accolades ===
The Flash has been nominated for six BMI Film, TV & Visual Media Awards (won all), two Hollywood Post Alliance Awards, one Hugo Award, seventeen IGN Awards (winning four), ten Kids' Choice Awards, sixteen Leo Awards (winning five), two MTV Movie & TV Awards, five People's Choice Awards (winning one), one Primetime Emmy Award, twenty-two Saturn Awards (winning seven), one TCA Award, twenty-seven Teen Choice Awards (winning six), one TV Guide Award (won), and one Visual Effects Society Award. The show also holds the world records for "Most in-demand superhero TV show" and "Most in-demand action and adventure TV show" from the Guinness World Records.

In 2016, Rolling Stone ranked the show 23rd on its list of the "40 Best Science Fiction TV Shows of All Time".

== Other media ==
=== Digital comic ===
The Flash: Season Zero, written by Kreisberg, Brooke Eikmeier and Katherine Walczak, with art by Phil Hester and Eric Gapstur, is intended to take place between the pilot episode and episode 2. Kreisberg stated, "Barry will [already] be the Flash, he will have his team, everyone will be in that world, and we'll [sic] introducing a new set of villains that we won't be seeing on the TV show. It'll feel like the same heart, humor and spectacle that you get watching Flash." The comic will showcase the entire TV cast, plus new rogues, a group of circus performers who gained super powers as a result of the S.T.A.R. Labs particle accelerator explosion. The group is led by Mr. Bliss, a character who first appeared in Starman. The comic launched digitally biweekly on September 8, 2014, with its first physical release featuring a collection of the digital releases, releasing on October 1.

=== The Chronicles of Cisco ===
On February 24, 2015, The CW launched a blog account known as The Chronicles of Cisco. The blog, originally based at Tumblr, features posts written by the fictional character of Cisco Ramon, at first serving as write-ups of the metahuman villains on the show. Starting with the second season of the show, the posts evolved into the general musings of Ramon and his commentary on the events during and outside of The Flash's episodes. On September 17, 2019, The Chronicles of Cisco moved to Instagram.

=== Promotional shorts ===
==== Chronicles of Cisco: Entry 0419 ====
On April 19, 2016, a four-episode series of shorts, titled Chronicles of Cisco: Entry 0419, premiered. The series, which was presented by AT&T, features Valdes and Britne Oldford reprise their role as Cisco Ramon and Shawna Baez / Peek-a-Boo, respectively. Set in the second season of the television series, the series sees Cisco attempting to make the Flash suit bulletproof and body-odor proof. While working on these, he receives a late-night Meta-Human Alert within S.T.A.R. Labs, and learns that Peek-a-Boo triggered the alert. She has come to S.T.A.R. Labs to make Cisco create a weapon for her, as he did for Golden Glider, Captain Cold, and Heat Wave. When he does not cooperate, she shoots him. Cisco survives being shot, realizing that the orange soda he spilled on his shirt was the missing catalyst to his bulletproof formula. Cisco tries to bring Peek-a-Boo back to the pipeline, but she locks him in the cell instead. Cisco is then seen being woken up due to a call from Barry. He believes he dreamt the whole experience, until he finds the bullet that shot him on the ground.

==== Stretched Scenes ====
On November 14, 2017, a three-episode series of shorts, known as "Stretched Scenes", premiered. The series, presented by Microsoft Surface, features Hartley Sawyer, Danielle Panabaker, and Candice Patton as Ralph Dibny, Cailtin Snow, and Iris West respectively. Set during the show's fourth season, it shows Dibny as he continually bothers Cailtin and Iris for their help, or for attention. The shorts premiered online as well as during the commercial breaks of the episodes "When Harry Met Harry...", "Therefore I Am", and "Don't Run".

=== Video games ===
The series has also been featured in other video games based on DC Comics property. In the mobile version of Injustice: Gods Among Us, the show's versions of the Flash and Reverse-Flash appear as alternate costumes for the Flash. The show's version of S.T.A.R. Labs also appears as a hidden area in Lego Dimensions. The video game Lego DC Super-Villains features DLC inspired by The Flash in the "DC Super Heroes: TV Series DLC Character Pack". The DLC pack includes The Flash and Vibe as playable characters.

=== Books ===
==== Novels ====
On November 29, 2016, Titan Books released The Flash: The Haunting of Barry Allen, a tie-in novelization written by Susan and Clay Griffith, set during the course of the second season, after Barry has closed the temporal anomaly that nearly destroyed Central City. Barry must seek help from Oliver Queen, due to his own abilities beginning to break down, in order to deal with five members of his Rogues Gallery—including Pied Piper, Weather Wizard, and Peek-a-Boo. The story continued in Arrow: A Generation of Vipers, released on March 28, 2017. A subsequent novel, following the villain Weather Wizard in his attempts at revenge, was released in May 2018. Written by Richard A. Knaak, it is titled The Flash: Climate Changeling.

In October 2017, Abrams Books started a new trilogy of The Flash novels, written by Barry Lyga, aimed at middle-grade readers in tandem with a similar trilogy of Supergirl novels. The first, The Flash: Hocus Pocus, was released on October 3, 2017. The novel takes place in an alternate timeline where the show's "Flashpoint" event never occurred, and The Flash must fight a villain known as Hocus Pocus who can control the minds and actions of people. A sequel, The Flash: Johnny Quick was released on April 3, 2018, as well as a third novel, titled The Flash: The Tornado Twins, on October 2, 2018.

==== Behind-the-scenes ====
On October 21, 2016, "The Art and Making of The Flash" by Abbie Bernstein was released. This is a 160-page behind-the-scenes book with production art and behind-the-scenes photography. The book also includes interviews with the cast and crew from the show.

==== Guidebooks ====
In May 2018, Titan Books released the first guidebook for The Flash, written by Nick Aires from the perspective of Cisco Ramon. S.T.A.R. Labs: Cisco Ramon's Journal features "his confidential journal entries, covering everything from his tech designs, the villains and other heroes the team encounter, the team's personal challenges and his own Vibe abilities prior to Flashpoint."

A second guidebook for The Flash was released in November 2018, this time published by Abrams Books. The Secret Files of Barry Allen: The Ultimate Guide to the Hit TV Show features the Flash's "top-secret notes", as well as "classified S.T.A.R. Labs dossiers on everyone in Central City", an episode guide on the first four season of the series, and details on the life of the Flash "in Barry's own words."

=== Audio series ===
Audio studio Serial Box is currently developing an audio series based on The Flash, titled The Flash: Rogues. The series will feature Lex Luthor altering the timeline in order to turn The Flash, Green Arrow, White Canary, and Supergirl evil, while their friends attempt to fix the timeline. The series currently has eight episodes planned.

== Arrowverse and the DC multiverse ==
In January 2015, The CW president Mark Pedowitz announced the intention to do a Flash/Arrow crossover every season, and The CW announced that an animated web-series, Vixen, featuring the DC heroine of the same name and set in the universe of Arrow and The Flash, would be debuting on CW Seed in late 2015. The character is expected to make a live-action appearance on Arrow and/or The Flash as well. The next month, it was reported that a spin-off series, which is described as a superhero team-up show, was in discussion by The CW for a possible 2015–16 midseason release. Berlanti and Kreisberg would executive produce alongside Guggenheim and Sarah Schechter. The potential series would be headlined by several recurring characters from both Arrow and The Flash, with the potential for other Arrow/Flash characters to cross over to the new series as well. In May 2015, The CW officially picked up the series, titled Legends of Tomorrow.

The second season begins to explore the concept of the multiverse by introducing Earth-2, which features doppelgängers of the inhabitants of Earth-1 (the main setting of Arrow, The Flash, and Legends of Tomorrow), along with Jay Garrick, the Flash of Earth-3, and Zoom. In the episode "Welcome to Earth-2", as Barry, Cisco and Harrison Wells of Earth-2 travel to Earth-2, glimpses of the multiverse are seen, including an image of Supergirl star Melissa Benoist as Supergirl and an image of John Wesley Shipp as the Flash from the 1990 television series, implying the two characters and their respective television series exist on alternate Earths to Earth-1; Supergirl's world is later designated Earth-38 in the Arrowverse multiverse. Gustin appeared as Barry on the eighteenth episode of Supergirl, "Worlds Finest", which aired on CBS on March 28, 2016. Intersecting with the events of the eighteenth episode of The Flash, which aired on April 19, 2016, Barry accidentally arrives on Earth-38 and helps Kara battle two of her enemies, Silver Banshee (Italia Ricci) and Livewire (Brit Morgan), before getting Kara's help to return to Earth-1.
