= Andrew Kreisberg =

American television writer and producer

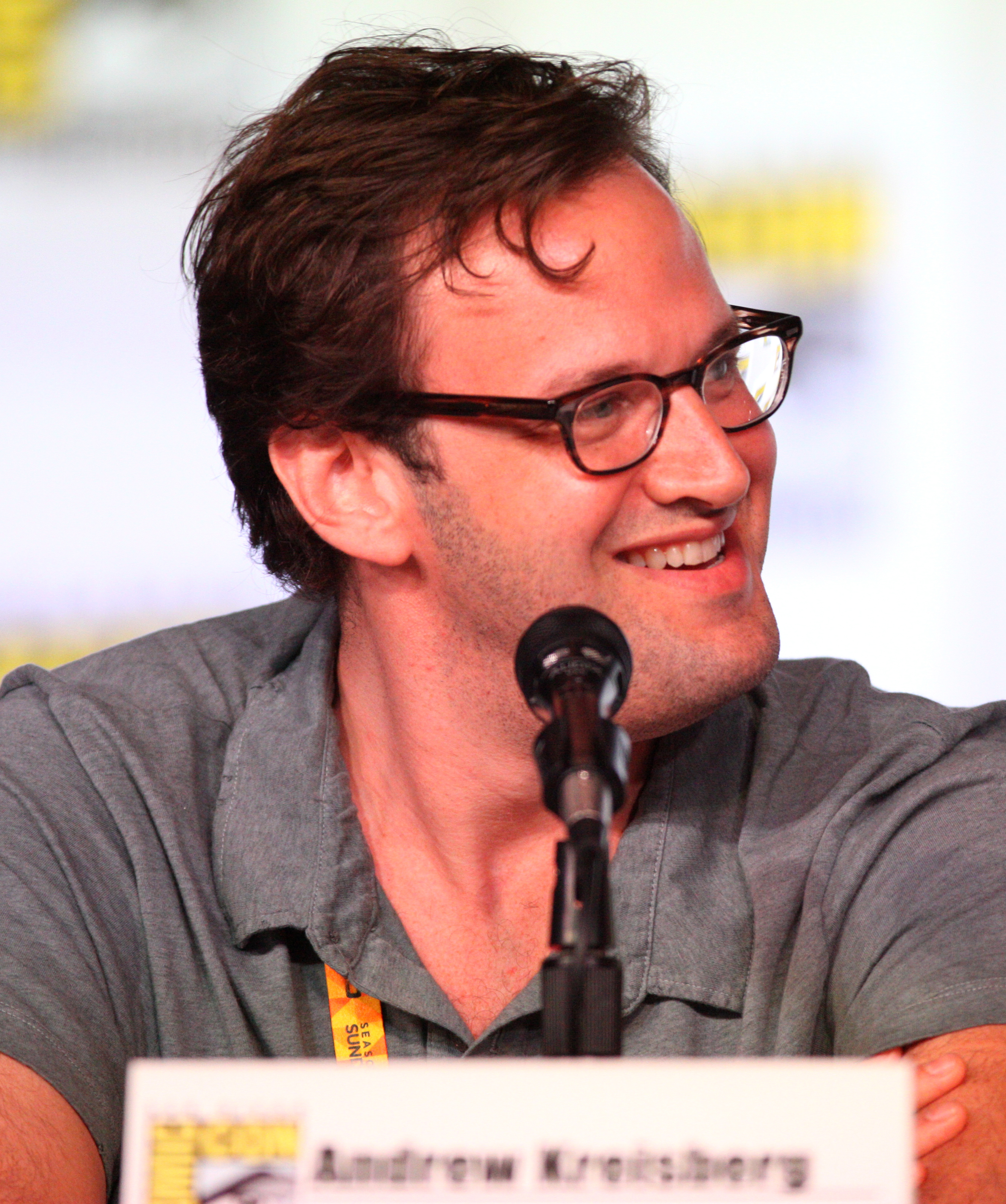
- Kreisberg at the 2012 San Diego Comic-Con
- Born: April 23, 1971 (age 55)
- Education: Boston University; College of Communication; Class of 1993
- Occupations: Writer, producer
- Years active: 1998–2017

Andrew Kreisberg (born April 23, 1971) is an American former television writer, producer and comic book writer. He is best known as the co-creator of the television series The Flash, Arrow, Supergirl and Legends of Tomorrow.

== Personal life and education ==
Kreisberg graduated from the Boston University College of Communication in 1993. Kreisberg is Jewish.

== Career ==
=== Television ===
His first job was on the short-lived animated sitcom Mission Hill. He has written for several other series including: Justice League, The Simpsons, Hope & Faith, Boston Legal, Lipstick Jungle, Eli Stone, The Vampire Diaries, Star Wars: The Clone Wars, My Family, and Warehouse 13.

In November 2015, Kreisberg signed a multi-year deal with Warner Bros. Television, through which he would continue to develop new projects as well as remain the sole showrunner of The Flash, co-showrunner of Supergirl (along with Ali Adler), and executive producer on Arrow and Legends of Tomorrow. In November 2017, his position with Warner Bros. was terminated due to allegations of sexual harassment.

==== Fringe ====
In 2009, he joined the FOX science-fiction/horror series Fringe as a co-executive producer and writer. At the end of season one, Kreisberg left the show. He co-wrote the following episodes:

- "Midnight" (01.18) (co-written with co-executive producer J.H. Wyman)
- "Unearthed" (02.11) (co-written with co-executive producer David H. Goodman)

==== Booster Gold ====
In 2011, Kreisberg was hired to write a pilot based on DC Comics hero Booster Gold, for Syfy. The script went through many iterations and was said to be in consideration at the network. This project was shelved since Warner Bros. severed all ties with Kreisberg in November 2017.

==== Arrowverse ====
In 2011, Kreisberg, Marc Guggenheim, and Greg Berlanti began developing Arrow, a re-imagining of the DC Comics comic book character Green Arrow for The CW. In January 2012, The CW picked the project up to pilot. On January 31, 2012, actor Stephen Amell was cast in the title role of Oliver Queen/Arrow. On May 11, 2012, The CW order Arrow to series. It premiered on October 10, 2012.

In July 2013, it was announced that Kreisberg, fellow Arrow co-creator Berlanti and DC Comics CCO Geoff Johns would be introducing Barry Allen during the show's second season, with the twentieth episode serving as a backdoor pilot. Actor Grant Gustin was cast and first appeared in the eighth episode of the second season, "The Scientist". The CW producers were pleased with the handling of the character, and greenlit a pilot episode, foregoing the backdoor version. In May 2014, The Flash was officially ordered to series. It premiered October 7, 2014.

On February 26, 2015, it was announced that Kreisberg, along with Guggenheim and Berlanti, would write/executive produce a spin-off series featuring Caity Lotz, Victor Garber, Brandon Routh and Wentworth Miller as White Canary, Martin Stein, the Atom, and Captain Cold respectively, for a potential 2016 premiere. The series, titled Legends of Tomorrow premiered on January 21, 2016.

=== Comics ===
Kreisberg has written for the comic book series Green Arrow and Black Canary and Batman Confidential.

In 2008, Arcana Comics began publishing Helen Killer, a comic book by Kreisberg with art by Matthew Rice. In it, a college-aged Helen Keller is given a device which allows her to see and hear and which increases her physical abilities, at which point she is hired to protect the President of the United States.

It was announced in July 2014, that Kreisberg and Arrow executive story editor Ben Sokolowski would be taking over the Green Arrow title in October of that year, beginning with issue #35.

== Allegations of sexual harassment ==
On November 10, 2017, Kreisberg was suspended from his role as showrunner on The Flash, Arrow, Legends of Tomorrow, and Supergirl, after fifteen women and four men accused him of sexual harassment. On November 29, 2017, he was fired from all Warner Bros. Television projects.

In October 2023, Vanity Fair reported that Kreisberg had been arrested in March 2023 and charged with forcible touching following an alleged incident at a bar mitzvah in Westchester County, New York. The charges against Kreisberg were later dropped.

== Filmography ==
Year	Title	Credited as			Notes
Year	Title	Writer	Producer	Executive producer	Notes
1998	Malcolm & Eddie	Yes			Writer (1 episode)
2000–2002	Mission Hill	Yes			Writer (1 episode)
2001	Cousin Skeeter	Yes			Writer (1 episode)
2002–2003	The Simpsons	Yes			Writer (2 episodes), story editor, executive story editor
2002–2004	Justice League	Yes			Writer (3 episodes)
2003–2004	Hope & Faith	Yes	Yes		Writer (2 episodes); co-producer
2005–2007	Boston Legal	Yes	Yes		Writer (9 episodes); producer
2007	The Wedding Bells		Yes		Supervising producer
2008	Lipstick Jungle	Yes			Writer (1 episode)
2008–2009	Eli Stone	Yes	Yes		Writer (7 episodes); supervising producer, co-executive producer
2009	The Vampire Diaries	Yes	Yes		Writer (2 episodes); co-executive producer
2009	Star Wars: The Clone Wars	Yes			Writer (1 episode)
2009–2010	Fringe	Yes	Yes		Writer (2 episodes); co-executive producer
2009–2011	My Family	Yes			Writer (2 episodes)
2010–2011	Warehouse 13	Yes	Yes		Writer (4 episodes); co-executive producer
2011	Red Faction: Origins	Yes			Television film; with Paul de Meo and Danny Bilson, based on the video game developed by Volition
2012–2017	Arrow	Yes		Yes	Co-developer; writer (17 episodes)
2014–2017	The Flash	Yes		Yes	Co-developer; writer (10 episodes)
2015	The Oscars	Yes			TV special; with Greg Berlanti & Seth Grahame-Smith & Michael Green
2015–2017	Supergirl	Yes		Yes	Co-developer; writer (5 episodes)
2016–2017	Legends of Tomorrow	Yes		Yes	Co-developer; writer (2 episodes)

== Bibliography ==
=== DC Comics ===
- JLA: Classified #49: "To Live in Hearts We Leave Behind" (with Paulo Siqueira, 2008)
- Batman Confidential #22–25, 29 & 30 (with Scott McDaniel, 2008–2009) collected as Batman Confidential: Dead to Rights (tpb, 144 pages, 2010, ISBN 1-4012-2925-5)
- Green Arrow:
  - Green Arrow and Black Canary (with Mike Norton and Renato Guedes (co-features in #25–28), 2009–2010) collected as:
    - Enemies List (collects #15–20, tpb, 144 pages, 2009, ISBN 1-401-22498-9)
    - Big Game (collects #21–26, tpb, 192 pages, 2010, ISBN 1-401-22709-0)
    - Five Stages (collects #27–29, tpb, 128 pages, 2010, ISBN 1-4012-2898-4)
  - Arrow Volume 1 (tpb, 208 pages, 2013, ISBN 1-4012-4299-5) includes:
    - Arrow: Test Drive (co-written by Kreisberg, Marc Guggenheim, Greg Berlanti and Geoff Johns, art by Omar Francia, digital one-shot, 2012)
    - Arrow #1, 2 & 4 (co-written by Kreisberg and Marc Guggenheim, art by Mike Grell (#1–2) and Eric Nguyen (#4), digital, 2012)
  - Green Arrow vol. 5 #35–40 (co-written by Kreisberg and Ben Sokolowski, art by Daniel Sampere, 2012) collected in Green Arrow: Kingdom (tpb, 144 pages, 2015, ISBN 1-4012-5762-3)
- Superman: World of New Krypton (with Pete Woods; Kreisberg left the series before the release of the first issue and the series ended up being co-written by Greg Rucka and James Robinson)
- Justice League of America's Vibe #1 & 2 (co-written by Kreisberg and Geoff Johns, art by Pete Woods, 2013) collected in Justice League of America's Vibe: Breach (tpb, 232 pages, 2014, ISBN 1-4012-4331-2)

=== Other publishers ===
- Hellen Killer #1–4 (with Matthew Rice, Arcana Studios, 2007–2008)
- Darksiders II #1–5 (with Roger Robinson; issues #3–5 are co-written by Kreisberg and David Slagle, digital, Dark Horse, 2012) collected as Darksiders II: Death's Door (hc, 64 pages, 2012, ISBN 1-61655-026-0)

Preceded by Judd Winick	Green Arrow and Black Canary writer 2009–2010	Succeeded by J. T. Krul
