= Pilot (Legends of Tomorrow) =

- Legends of Tomorrow episodes
- Episode nos.: Season 1 Episodes 1 and 2
- Directed by: Glen Winter
- Written by: Greg Berlanti; Marc Guggenheim; Andrew Kreisberg; Phil Klemmer
- Production codes: 4X6351 (Part 1); 4X6352 (Part 2)
- Original air dates: January 21, 2016 (Part 1); January 28, 2016 (Part 2)

Guest appearances
- Stephen Amell as Oliver Queen; Katie Cassidy as Laurel Lance; Peter Francis James as Aldus Boardman; Neal McDonough as Damien Darhk

Episode chronology
← Previous —	Next → "Blood Ties"
- Legends of Tomorrow season 1

"Pilot" is the two-part series premiere of the American science fiction series Legends of Tomorrow; it was directed by Glen Winter, and written by series creators Greg Berlanti, Marc Guggenheim, Phil Klemmer, and Andrew Kreisberg. The episodes were shot in Vancouver, Canada; only one set was built and most of the filming was done on location. The episodes star an ensemble cast of Arthur Darvill, Franz Drameh, Victor Garber, Falk Hentschel, Caity Lotz, Dominic Purcell, Ciara Renée, Brandon Routh, and Wentworth Miller.

In "Pilot", Rip Hunter (Darvill) recruits several heroes and villains to help him defeat the immortal warrior Vandal Savage (Casper Crump), who has subjugated the planet. "Pilot, Part 1" premiered on January 21, 2016, to an audience of 3.21 million viewers, and "Pilot, Part 2" debuted on January 28 to an audience of 2.32 million. The episodes were broadcast on The CW and received mixed reviews from critics, who felt the series had a lot of potential. Part two was better received than the first, due to its focus on action sequences. The chemistry between the cast in both parts was met with mixed reception.

== Plot ==
=== Part 1 ===
In the year 2166, the immortal warrior Vandal Savage has conquered Earth. In an effort to save humanity, Rip Hunter, a Time Master, travels to 2016 to assemble a group of superheroes and supervillains to stop Savage's rise to power. The group consists of Ray Palmer, Sara Lance, Jefferson Jackson, Martin Stein, Mick Rory, and Leonard Snart. Additionally, he recruits Carter Hall and Kendra Saunders, the reincarnations of a prince and priestess from Ancient Egypt, and the only people capable of killing Savage. Hunter takes them to 1975 to talk to Professor Boardman, a leading expert on Savage. While providing information on Savage, Boardman reveals he is the son of Kendra and Carter from one of their past reincarnations. Meanwhile, a time-traveling bounty hunter named Chronos attacks Hunter's ship Waverider. Boardman is mortally wounded, but the team regroup and escape. The attack, along with Boardman's death, forces Hunter to reveal Chronos is chasing him for stealing Waverider and going on the mission against the Time Council's wishes, and that he wants to take revenge on Savage for murdering his wife and son in 2166. All members agree to aid Hunter, who warns time will resist the mission. In Norway, Savage possesses weapons of mass destruction.

=== Part 2 ===
Still in 1975, the team infiltrates a weapons auction at which Savage intends to sell a nuclear warhead, but he becomes aware of their presence. A piece of Ray's suit is left behind as the team escape. Angry at the recklessness, Hunter points out what happens and how the technology of Ray's suit will be used to create super weapons that lead to the destruction of Central City in 2016. The team splits up; Stein, Jax, and Sara retrieve the missing piece of Ray's suit with the help of Stein's younger self, while Ray, Leonard, and Mick search for the dagger that killed Kendra and Carter in their first lives. The dagger is found in Savage's home, and he imprisons Ray, Leonard, and Mick, and calls the rest of the team. Kendra and Carter fight with Savage while the others fight with Savage's men. During the fight, Savage kills Carter with the dagger, revealing only Kendra can wield it to kill Savage. Kendra is injured and the team, who are determined to stop Savage, retreat and plan a new strategy.

== Production ==
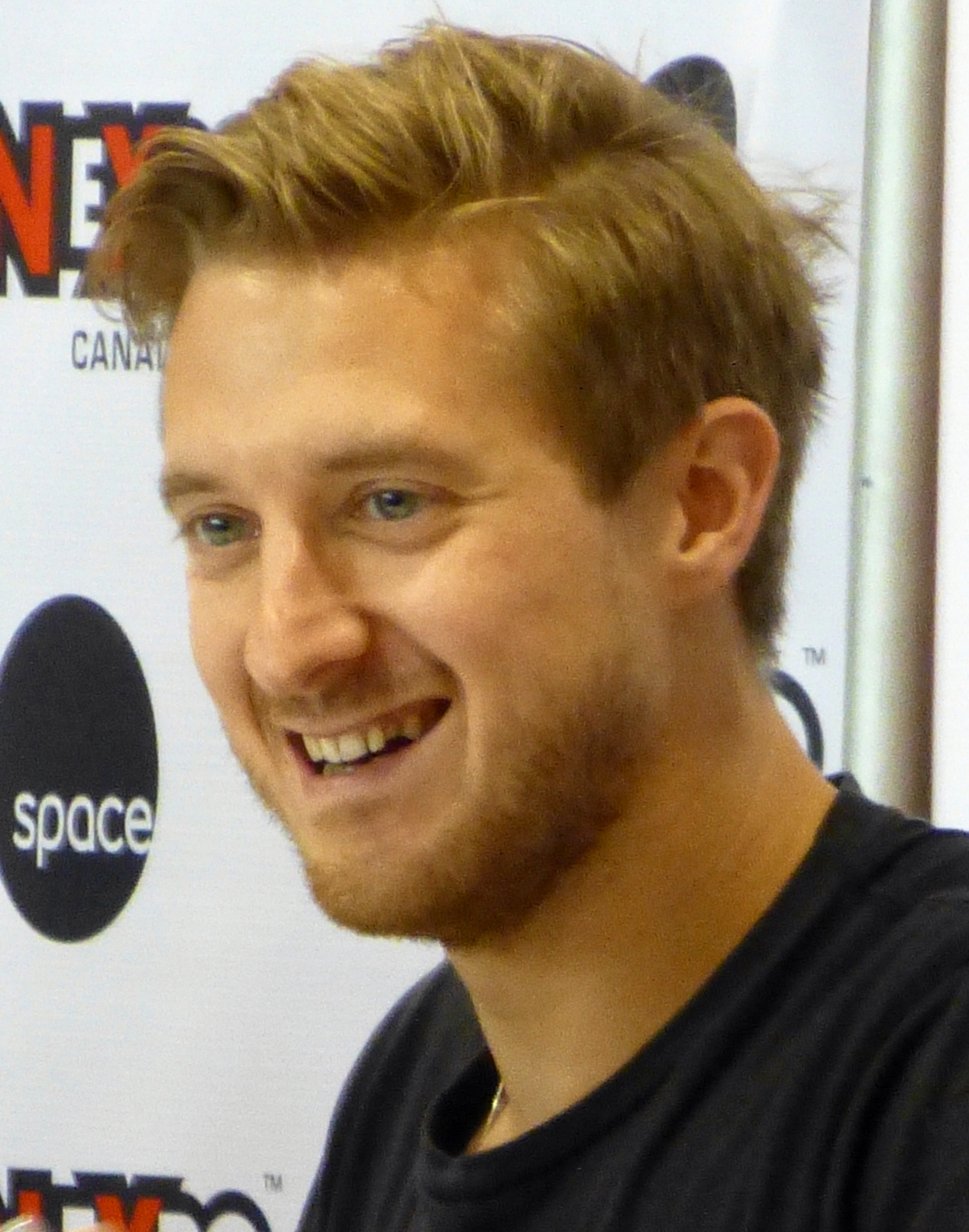
Series lead Arthur Darvill at the 2014 Fan Expo Canada in Toronto

"Pilot" was written by Greg Berlanti, Marc Guggenheim, Andrew Kreisberg, and Phil Klemmer, and was directed by Glen Winter. The episode was titled "Pilot" despite the series skipping the pilot phase and getting a "straight to series" order.

In January 2015, it was revealed the show would feature Brandon Routh as Ray Palmer, based on the eponymous DC Comics and who was introduced in the third season of Arrow. The following month, Wentworth Miller, Victor Garber, and Caity Lotz were revealed to be reprising their roles from previous Arrowverse media in the series as Leonard Snart / Captain Cold, Martin Stein / Firestorm, and Sara Lance respectively. In March, Dominic Purcell was revealed to be reprising his role as Mick Rory / Heatwave in the series. It was reported that three characters had yet to be cast; one of whom, labeled "the Traveler", was speculated by fans to be Rip Hunter. At the end of that month, Arthur Darvill was cast as Rip, and Ciara Renée was cast as Kendra Saunders / Hawkgirl. In April 2015, Franz Drameh was cast as Jefferson "Jax" Jackson / Firestorm. In August 2015, the final member of the main cast was revealed to be Falk Hentschel as Carter Hall / Hawkman. Shortly after, Casper Crump was announced as Vandal Savage, a villain of the series. According to Routh, for the first episodes of the series, Ray and Stein would have a rivalry that would further complicate the dynamic between Jax and Stein.

Filming began on September 9, 2015. The episodes were filmed back-to-back in Vancouver, Canada. According to Winter, the only set built was that for Waverider and most of the episode was filmed on location, which he said was typical for pilots. In an interview with Comic Book Resources, Winter said the "new facet for Legends was that there's no #1 on the call sheet. There are seven or eight leads"; he found the hardest part of filming was working out the chemistry between the actors. The fight scene at the auction was shot in one take; Winter stated it was his favorite part to film due to the technical elements involved.

Several actors from Arrow made guest appearances in the episodes, including series lead Stephen Amell as Oliver Queen, series regular Katie Cassidy as Laurel Lance, and Neal McDonough as Damien Darhk the primary villain of Arrow's fourth season. Peter Francis James appears as Aldus Boardman, the son of Kendra Saunders and Carter Hall in previous reincarnations.

== Release and reception ==
In November 2015, Legends of Tomorrow was given a release date of January 2016. The premier was preceded by a two-part crossover between The Flash and Arrow titled "Heroes Join Forces", which aired in December 2015. "Pilot" was released in two parts on The CW on January 21 and 28, 2016. The first part of the episode had a live audience of 3.21 million viewers. It held a 1.2 percent share of adults 18-49, meaning that it was seen by 1.2 percent of all households within that demographic. The second part was viewed by 2.89 million, 320.000 fewer than the first part, with a share of 1.1 percent. The third episode, "Blood Ties", was viewed by 2.32 million live viewers with a 0.9/3 share. When accounting for seven day DVR viewership, the episodes were seen by an additional 2.03 million and 1.64 million viewers respectively. The episodes were the two most-viewed episodes of Legends of Tomorrow's first season.

=== Critical response ===
The episodes were met with mixed reviews, with several critics believing that the series had good potential. On the review aggregate website Rotten Tomatoes, "Pilot, Part 1" holds a 67% approval rating, with an average rating of 6.2/10 based on 18 reviews. According to the website's consensus, the first part "suffers from too many characters and too much exposition, but there's fun to be had in the chaos". "Pilot, Part 2" holds an 88% approval rating, with an average rating of 7.28/10 based on reviews from 17 critics. The consensus reads: "Legends sprints ahead in 'Part 2,' an exciting, action-packed episode that finishes setting up what could be one of the funnest comic book adaptations yet".

Russ Burlingame, in an advanced review for ComicBook.com, praised the first part, writing that the episode "delivers a sharp, enjoyable pilot that's arguably the most attention-grabbing and entertaining from any of the current crop of superhero shows". He believed the episode was superior to Arrow and The Flash's pilots. However, The Hollywood Reporter's Daniel Fienberg felt the first episode was a step down from the first two Arrowverse pilots. He found the episode suffered from a bloated cast and too much exposition. Jesse Schedeen of IGN gave part one a 7.7/10 rating, praising the show's "epic scope", "fun character dynamics", and Darvill's performance. He gave the second part of "Pilot" a rating of 8.4/10, saying it "improved in its sophomore episode thanks to great character dynamics and superhero action". In a review for Screen Rant, Alice Walker felt that while the second part served as a good conclusion, separating the episodes hurt the story. Oliver Sava of The A.V. Club opined that the second part was an improvement on the first; he praised the action sequences and the comparative lack of exposition. However, he found many of the problems with the first part were still present, including the poor characterization of the cast. He graded the episode a "B". Writing for Vox, Caroline Framke felt while the premise was good, the execution was "exhausting". She stated the episode suffered from poor character dynamics, bad pacing, an inconsistent tone, and lack of action.

The characters of Kendra and Carter were negatively received. Sava noted a lack of chemistry between the two characters, citing Hentschel's acting in particular. He added, "it's actually a relief when Vandal Savage kills Carter at the end of the episode." Walker felt the first part mishandled Carter, however she still found his death impactful. Framke labeled the pair "the weakest characters by a mile" and found both Renée and Hentschel's acting to be dull. She also found their backstory boring and overshadowed by other scenes.
