= Tommy Merlyn =

DC Comics supervillain

- Tommy Merlyn in Green Arrow (vol. 5) #36 (January 2015). Art by Daniel Sampere.

Publication information
- Publisher: DC Comics
- First appearance: Green Arrow (vol. 5) #0 (September 2012)
- Created by: Judd Winick; Freddie E. Williams II

In-story information
- Full name: Thomas "Tommy" Merlyn
- Species: Human
- Notable aliases: Dark Archer
- Abilities: Master archer Expert marksman

Thomas "Tommy" Merlyn is a supervillain appearing in comic books published by DC Comics related to Green Arrow. Created by Judd Winick and Freddie E. Williams II, he is the son of Arthur King / Malcolm Merlyn / Dark Archer.

Colin Donnell portrayed the character in the Arrowverse television series Arrow.

== Publication history ==
Tommy Merlyn made his debut in Green Arrow (vol. 5) #0 (September 2012), as part of "The New 52" reboot while coinciding with the then-recently debuted television series Arrow a month later.

== Fictional character biography ==
Tommy Merlyn is introduced as the son of Malcolm Merlyn. Tommy is best friends with billionaire playboy Oliver Queen. When Oliver's father had relegated him to clerical work on an oil rig on the Pacific Ocean, he turned the rig into a hub for wild parties. At one such party, Oliver had decided to demonstrate archery to Leena and Tommy. The group of friends were awaiting on a rock star hired by Oliver to play for them. Things got much worse when the helicopter meant to be carrying this rock star turned out to have been commandeered by oil-thieving terrorists. Tommy dragged Oliver to safety, leaving Leena outside on the platform. The two of them discovered a wounded crewman who blamed Oliver for the security breach, as the terrorists commandeered one of the helicopters that was not even supposed to have been there. These terrorists had fixed the platform and several of its occupants including Leena with explosives, holding them hostage until they could siphon millions of dollars' worth of crude oil.

Tommy and Oliver managed to get past some sentries, and despite his warnings, Oliver went up onto the platform alone, armed with only a longbow, in the hopes of saving Leena. Oliver had a plan: to take just one shot, through the terrorist leader's wrist, causing him to drop the detonator into the ocean. Unfortunately, on its way down, the detonator bounced against one of the platform's struts, and activated. Leena and everyone around her were obliterated by the explosion. Before Oliver could be caught in the explosion, Tommy leapt out, and thrust them both into the safety of the ocean. Badly burnt, Tommy warned that these would not be the only people that Oliver's recklessness would get killed, before passing out. One year later, a monastery on a pacific island has been caring for a badly burnt coma patient for years. Suddenly, Tommy wakes up.

He is next seen in the 2014 Green Arrow storyline "Kingdom", in which he appears as the Dark Archer. Killing Mack Morgan before he could give critical intelligence to destroy the reputation of his employer, John King. King, a billionaire hired Merlyn with bringing Mia Dearden to him. Thanks to John Diggle's skillful driving, Oliver manages to catch up to Merlyn on top of a monorail train, where he learns that Tommy is nearly a match for him with a bow. When Tommy attempts to attack him at close range, though, he recognizes his opponent as his old friend just as they pass under a tunnel. When Oliver recovers from the quick duck, Tommy is gone. Fortunately, he left Mia behind.

== Powers and abilities ==
As his father has been established as one of the greatest and most accurate archers in the DC Universe, Tommy Merlyn's archery and marksmanship skills can be compared to those of Green Arrow, Roy Harper and Connor Hawke.

== In other media ==
Numerous characters based on Tommy Merlyn appear in media set in the Arrowverse, portrayed by Colin Donnell as an adult.

- The primary Earth-1 incarnation appears in Arrow, portrayed by Arien Boey as a child in the third season. This version is a spoiled playboy, the childhood best friend of Oliver Queen, the paternal half-brother of Thea Queen, and the son of Malcolm Merlyn. In the first season, Tommy dates Laurel Lance and lives off Malcolm's financial support until Malcolm cuts off him off. Nonetheless, Tommy and Oliver open the Verdant nightclub, though their friendship is strained when Tommy learns that Oliver is a murderous vigilante. Additionally, he breaks up with Laurel, believing the latter is still in love with Oliver. Amidst Malcolm's Undertaking, Tommy is fatally injured while saving Laurel from a collapsing building and makes amends with Oliver before he dies.
- An Earth-X counterpart of Tommy appears in the crossover "Crisis on Earth-X" as his Earth's "Prometheus". A partner and friend of Dark Arrow, he is an enforcer for the New Reichsmen. He joins their invasion of Earth-1, but is defeated and captured by Sara Lance and Alex Danvers. Earth-1 Oliver interrogates him and offers redemption, but Tommy scoffs at the notion and takes a suicide pill out of loyalty to Earth-X and to spite Earth-1's heroes.
- An Earth-2 counterpart of Tommy appears in the eighth season premiere of Arrow as the Dark Archer. Upset over Thea's death by Vertigo overdose, Tommy seeks to destroy Star City with his own version of the Undertaking. However, Earth-1 Oliver defeats him and talks him out of it. Tommy is later vaporized by anti-matter during Earth-2's destruction.
- An Earth-Prime incarnation of Tommy appears in the series finale of Arrow. Having married his version of Laurel before the latter died, he gains closure after meeting Earth-2 Laurel during Oliver's funeral.
