= Black Canary (disambiguation) =

Black Canary is a character appearing in American comic books published by DC Comics.

Black Canary may also refer to:

- Dinah Drake (Arrowverse), the second character to use the Black Canary name in the TV series Arrow.
- Laurel Lance (Arrowverse Earth-1), the first character to use the Black Canary name in the TV series Arrow.
- Laurel Lance (Arrowverse Earth-2), the third character to use the Black Canary name in the TV series Arrow.
- Sara Lance, character on the television series Arrow, based on the DC Comics character Black Canary. She is the original Canary. In "Fury Rogue", Cisco referred to her as the first Black Canary.
- Black Canary (comic book)

== See also ==
- Canary Black, a 2024 action-thriller film
