= Arrow season 1 =

Arrow
- Season 1
- Region 1 DVD cover
- Showrunners: Greg Berlanti; Marc Guggenheim; Andrew Kreisberg
- Starring: Stephen Amell; Katie Cassidy; Colin Donnell; David Ramsey; Willa Holland; Susanna Thompson; Paul Blackthorne
- No. of episodes: 23

Release
- Original network: The CW
- Original release: October 10, 2012 – May 15, 2013

Season chronology
- Next → Season 2

The first season of the American action television series Arrow premiered on The CW on October 10, 2012, at 8:00 pm (ET) and concluded on May 15, 2013, with a total of 23 episodes, after the network ordered a full season on October 22, 2012. The series is based on the DC Comics character Green Arrow, a costumed crime-fighter created by Mort Weisinger and George Papp, and is set in the Arrowverse, sharing continuity with other Arrowverse television series. The showrunners for this season were Greg Berlanti, Marc Guggenheim and Andrew Kreisberg. Stephen Amell stars as Oliver Queen, with principal cast members Katie Cassidy as Laurel Lance, Colin Donnell as Tommy Merlyn, David Ramsey as John Diggle, Willa Holland as Thea Queen, Susanna Thompson as Moira Queen, and Paul Blackthorne as Quentin Lance.

The series follows billionaire playboy Oliver Queen (Stephen Amell), who claimed to have spent five years shipwrecked on Lian Yu, a mysterious island in the North China Sea, before returning home to Starling City (later renamed "Star City") to fight crime and corruption as a secret vigilante whose weapon of choice is a bow and arrow. In the first season, Oliver returns to Starling City and is reunited with his mother Moira (Susanna Thompson), his sister Thea (Willa Holland), and his friend Tommy Merlyn (Colin Donnell). Oliver rekindles his relationships, while spending his nights hunting down and sometimes killing criminals as a hooded vigilante, known as The Hood. He uncovers Malcolm Merlyn's (John Barrowman) conspiracy to destroy "The Glades", a poorer section of Starling City that has become overridden with crime. John Diggle (David Ramsey) and Felicity Smoak (Emily Bett Rickards) assist Oliver in his crusade. Oliver also reconnects with ex-girlfriend, Laurel Lance (Katie Cassidy), who is still angry over his role in her sister, Sara's, presumed death, while her father, Detective Quentin Lance (Paul Blackthorne), suspects Oliver being the vigilante. The season features flashbacks to Oliver's first year on the island, and how it changed him, while trying to stop a mercenary force targeting the Chinese economy. After being saved by The Hood, Roy Harper (Colton Haynes) attempts to find him so he will train him so he can help others.

Production on the pilot began in March 2012 in Vancouver, British Columbia, Canada. Filming for the rest of the season began on July 18, 2012, and ended on April 18, 2013. The season was generally well received by critics, and averaged 3.68 million viewers each week. Amell's portrayal of Oliver Queen / Arrow drew comparison to Katniss Everdeen from The Hunger Games, while the season itself was found to be still looking for its own identity. The season would go on to win multiple awards, including twenty-one nominations in various categories. The season was released on DVD and Blu-ray on September 17, 2013. The series was renewed for a second season on February 11, 2013.

== Episodes ==
Arrow, season 1 episodes
No. overall	No. in season	Title	Directed by	Written by	Original release date	Prod. code	U.S. viewers (millions)
1	1	"Pilot"	David Nutter	Story by : Greg Berlanti & Marc Guggenheim; Teleplay by : Andrew Kreisberg & Marc Guggenheim	October 10, 2012	296818	4.14
Billionaire playboy Oliver Queen, missing and presumed dead after a shipwreck that claimed the life of his father, Robert, is discovered alive after five years on a remote Pacific island. He is welcomed home to Starling City by his mother Moira, stepfather Walter Steele, younger sister Thea, and best friend Tommy Merlyn, but they sense he has changed. Moira assigns John Diggle as Oliver's bodyguard. Oliver hides the truth about the man he has become and tries to reconcile with his former girlfriend, Laurel Lance, on whom he cheated with her sister Sara, another victim of the shipwreck. While reconnecting with those closest to him, Oliver secretly masquerades as a hooded vigilante archer by night, attempting to fulfill his father's dying request: to right the wrongs of his family. Oliver's first goal is to take down corrupt millionaire Adam Hunt, who has scammed millions from various people in the city. Laurel's father, police detective Quentin Lance, becomes determined to arrest the vigilante and works with Adam to stop him. In the end, Adam's security guard, Constantine Drakon, and many other henchmen are killed. Meanwhile, it is revealed Oliver's mother has an agenda at odds with her son's, having orchestrated a kidnapping to determine what Robert told him after the shipwreck.
2	2	"Honor Thy Father"	David Barrett	Story by : Greg Berlanti & Marc Guggenheim; Teleplay by : Andrew Kreisberg & Marc Guggenheim	October 17, 2012	2J7302	3.55
Laurel brings a civil suit against millionaire Martin Somers, who is also one of Oliver's targets, for taking part in drug trades with the Chinese Triad that ultimately led to the death of a young woman's father. As the vigilante, Oliver threatens Somers to make him confess to the murder as penance for all of the wrongs he has done to the city. Instead, Somers contacts the Triad, who send the assassin Chien Na Wei to kill Laurel. Oliver saves Laurel from Chien; he later obtains Somers' confession and gives an audio recording of it to Quentin. Meanwhile, Moira and Walter push Oliver to take a position at the company. Oliver stymies their efforts by using the opening of the company's new applied sciences division to publicly opt out of the position, knowing that he cannot simultaneously honor Robert's request to fight for the city and be the man Moira wants him to be. She is revealed to be conspiring with a man affiliated with the symbol in the book Robert gave Oliver. A flashback to Oliver's time on the island shows him being attacked by an unknown hooded figure wielding a bow and arrow.
3	3	"Lone Gunmen"	Guy Bee	Story by : Greg Berlanti & Andrew Kreisberg; Teleplay by : Marc Guggenheim & Andrew Kreisberg	October 24, 2012	2J7303	3.51
Oliver tracks down another millionaire from his list right before the latter is killed by an assassin known as Floyd Lawton. Oliver decides to build a new dance club above his hideout as a cover for his nighttime disappearances. While assessing the competition, he finds Thea, who tells him that Laurel and Tommy were involved during Oliver's absence. Laurel becomes suspicious when Oliver does not react to it and concludes he already knew. She and Tommy start dating again. Meanwhile, Oliver enlists the help of IT technician Felicity Smoak in order to learn that the venue for Floyd Lawton's next assignment is an auction which will be attended by many influential businessmen, including Walter. As the vigilante, he enlists the help of Quentin to foil Lawton's plan. Oliver succeeds, apparently killing Lawton in the process, but Diggle is shot during the fight. In order to save Diggle's life, Oliver is forced to reveal his dual identity to him. Flashbacks show that the Asian archer who attacked Oliver was actually trying to help him; Oliver misunderstands and "escapes" from the archer while being pursued by an unknown group of armed men.
4	4	"An Innocent Man"	Vince Misiano	Moira Kirland & Lana Cho	October 31, 2012	2J7304	3.05
Oliver offers Diggle the chance to fight at his side and help the city, which the latter refuses. Later, Oliver discovers a connection between Peter Declan, a death row inmate, and Jason Brodeur, one of the men on his list. As the vigilante, he enlists the help of Laurel to prove Declan's innocence. Working together, the pair uncovers the truth, but Brodeur has his mercenaries stage a prison riot so that they can have Laurel and Declan murdered before it is revealed. Oliver sneaks into the prison dressed as a guard and saves the two, with her realizing that the vigilante is merciless. Declan is exonerated while Brodeur is arrested. Diggle meets with Oliver and agrees to work with him so that he can both protect the city and protect Oliver from losing his humanity. Quentin arrests Oliver on suspicion of being the vigilante. Meanwhile, Walter discovers that Moira has been keeping the salvaged and sabotaged family yacht hidden in a warehouse. Flashbacks show that the archer forced Oliver to kill a quail for food, making it the latter's first kill. He was also taught to forget Laurel.
5	5	"Damaged"	Michael Schultz	Wendy Mericle & Ben Sokolowski	November 7, 2012	2J7305	3.75
Oliver hires Laurel as his attorney and his bail is accepted. Given Oliver's time on the island, the District Attorney offers an insanity plea along with indefinite treatment for post-traumatic stress disorder in a psychiatric facility. Oliver declines, instead offering to take a polygraph test to prove his innocence, which he then passes. While remanded under house arrest, Oliver throws a prison-themed party, maintaining his bachelor playboy façade. He has Diggle pose as the vigilante and stop a German arms dealer who is in the city to sell automatic weapons to the city's gangs. The plan works and the charges are dropped after Quentin kills a man who was sent by Moira's co-conspirator to murder Oliver. However, Laurel begins to suspect Oliver. Moira threatens her associate to stay away from her family. Walter leaves the house after confronting Moira about her lies. Flashbacks show Oliver caught and tortured by the armed men, led by Edward Fyers, for the location of the archer, who is revealed to be a former military officer, before being saved by him.
6	6	"Legacies"	John Behring	Moira Kirland & Marc Guggenheim	November 14, 2012	2J7306	3.83
Oliver begins preparing to attack another individual from the list, but Diggle argues that he should expand his work and help the police stop a group of bank robbers. Oliver initially refuses, believing that it detracts from his mission to right Robert's wrongs, but eventually agrees. Oliver deduces that the robbers are actually a family unit and that the leader Derek Reston worked for Queen Industries before Robert outsourced 1500 jobs to China, causing the Reston family to lose their home. Feeling guilty, Oliver tries to persuade Derek to do the right thing, but learns that the family are going to rob another bank. During Oliver's confrontation, Derek is fatally shot. Meanwhile, Tommy throws Laurel a fundraiser to support her law firm, CNRI, hoping to prove his love for her. Oliver and Moira manage to regain their emotional connection. Flashbacks show Oliver having a dream of Robert shaming him for his idleness and reveal how Oliver first discovered the target names in his father's notebook.
7	7	"Muse of Fire"	David Grossman	Story by : Andrew Kreisberg; Teleplay by : Geoff Johns & Marc Guggenheim	November 28, 2012	2J7307	3.74
Moira is almost shot by a mysterious assailant who was attempting to assassinate an associate of mob boss Frank Bertinelli. Oliver attempts to infiltrate Frank's business to discover the identity of the attacker. Frank blames Chien and the Triad gang for the murders of his people. Oliver learns that the attacker is Helena Bertinelli, Frank's daughter with whom he had just been on a date. Helena reveals that she is looking for revenge against her father, who she believes had her fiancé killed for gathering evidence against him to give to the FBI. Helena and Oliver are abducted by Frank's right-hand man, Nick Salvati, in connection to the deaths; she divulges that she was the one gathering evidence and murders Salvati after learning he was the one who killed her fiancé. She also deduces Oliver's identity as the vigilante after witnessing him fight Frank's henchmen. In the end, Helena and Oliver share a kiss. Meanwhile, Tommy is cut off financially by his father, Malcolm, who is revealed to be Moira's co-conspirator. Laurel sticks with him, stating that she does not want him for his money. Walter returns home.
8	8	"Vendetta"	Ken Fink	Beth Schwartz & Andrew Kreisberg	December 5, 2012	2J7308	3.35
Oliver decides to teach Helena that there is justice outside of revenge after witnessing her try to kill the head of the Triad. Diggle expresses his disapproval, but to no avail. She dresses as a purple vigilante and the duo has another man from the list arrested. Helena starts to buy into the idea, but leaves him after finding out that Laurel is his former girlfriend, as she believes they are still together. Helena goes after the Triad, killing their leader. As a result, Chien and her men go after Frank, believing him to be responsible, but Oliver gets there in time to stop them. Oliver also stops Helena from murdering Frank, who is arrested instead; she threatens to reveal Oliver's identity if he tries to come after her in the future. Meanwhile, Tommy finally tells Oliver about Malcolm's actions and asks for a job at the club that Oliver is attempting to build, which he provides. With Felicity's help, Walter learns more about the secret organization of which Moira is a part, finding a notebook containing the list.
9	9	"Year's End"	John Dahl	Story by : Greg Berlanti & Marc Guggenheim; Teleplay by : Andrew Kreisberg & Marc Guggenheim	December 12, 2012	2J7309	3.11
Hunt is killed by a mysterious archer. Quentin deduces that a copycat is at work, but his superior publicly blames the hooded vigilante. Oliver plans a Christmas party at the mansion to bring the spirit of the holidays back to his family. He saves some hostages from the archer and the two are both injured after fighting, with Oliver realizing that Robert wasn't the author of the list. The archer escapes and is shown to be Malcolm. Walter finds out about the vigilante's objective and is kidnapped by one of Malcolm's associates. The organization's plan is revealed to be starting six months later, when thousands of people will die for what it believes to be for the greater good. Flashbacks show the Chinese archer, Yao Fei, capturing Fyers, who tells Oliver that the island was a prison for dangerous criminals and that his unit was tasked with exterminating the inmates, including Yao, after the program was shut down. Yao is caught by the unit while leading Oliver to a possible escape from the island; Oliver makes it out.
10	10	"Burned"	Eagle Egilsson	Moira Kirland & Ben Sokolowski	January 16, 2013	2J7310	3.06
Six weeks after his fight with Malcolm, Oliver has paused all vigilante activity, despite insistence from Diggle. When a firefighter is killed in the line of duty, Laurel suspects that he was murdered and steals the phone the vigilante gave Quentin in order to contact him for help. Tracking down the suspect, Oliver is overpowered during the confrontation, but discovers that the murderer is Garfield Lynns, a firefighter thought to have died in a massive fire several years prior who survived with severe burns. In order to kill the fire chief, Lynns attends a fundraiser held to support the victims. As the vigilante, Oliver saves the chief just before Lynns commits suicide. The media calls the vigilante a hero; Oliver opts to resume his hunt of the list members. Moira decides to take over for Walter as Queen Consolidated's CEO. Quentin plants a listening device on the burner phone to monitor Laurel's communications with the vigilante. Flashbacks show Oliver killing a mercenary, wearing his uniform, and recovering his tools, including a map.
11	11	"Trust But Verify"	Nick Copus	Gabrielle Stanton	January 23, 2013	2J7311	3.14
After an armored truck is robbed, Oliver believes that one of the thieves is Marine Ted Gaynor, a target on his list. Diggle dismisses Oliver's assumption, as Gaynor was Diggle's commanding officer during his time in Afghanistan. Oliver finds Gaynor and steals encrypted data, though Diggle prevents Oliver from getting any information directly from Gaynor. The data is revealed to be plans for robbing armored trucks, which Oliver uses to track the thieves. Diggle learns that Gaynor masterminded the robberies and is forced to join Gaynor's team, but backs out of helping them. Oliver arrives in time and kills Gaynor. Meanwhile, Thea tells Oliver she believes that Moira and Malcolm have been involved since before Robert's death. Oliver asks Moira, who states Robert was unfaithful. Tommy refuses to sign off on Malcolm's wish to sell the clinic established by his mother, who died when he was eight, blaming Malcolm for leaving him for years thereafter. Thea is arrested by the police after crashing as a result of drug use. Flashbacks show Oliver being captured by the mercenaries, as Yao was apparently working for them.
12	12	"Vertigo"	Wendey Stanzler	Wendy Mericle & Ben Sokolowski	January 30, 2013	2J7312	2.97
The judge dismisses Thea's plea bargain and orders the charges brought to trial. Helping Thea, Oliver begins hunting down the supplier of the drug, which is known as Vertigo; he discovers the supplier is called "The Count" and arranges a meeting through his contacts with the Solntsevskaya Bratva. The meet is broken up by the police and the Count injects Oliver with a dose of Vertigo. While mid-overdose, the latter still continues his investigation. He uses the ingredients to track the location of the Count. As the vigilante, Oliver is able to confront the Count and inject him with Vertigo, causing irreparable damage. Laurel persuades Quentin to get Thea two years of probation along with community service, which she begins by working at Laurel's legal office. Felicity provides Oliver the list of names Steele discovered and informs him that they came from Moira. Flashbacks show Yao overpowering Oliver in a mandatory duel and making him appear dead. His body is thrown over a waterfall, where he wakes up and finds an upgraded map, planted by Yao.
13	13	"Betrayal"	Guy Bee	Lana Cho & Beth Schwartz	February 6, 2013	2J7313	2.96
Moira denies knowledge of the list. Diggle starts to investigate her daily activities. Laurel asks the vigilante for help when criminal Cyrus Vanch is released from prison. Using the microphone inside the burner, Quentin and his team intercept the vigilante, who manages to escape. Vanch kidnaps Laurel. Quentin and the vigilante team up to save Laurel, as Quentin realizes that Vanch's contacts on the police force are how he knew about her. The duo saves Laurel, the vigilante only barely stopping Quentin from murdering Vanch in a blind rage. Laurel demands Quentin stay away from her for betraying her trust. In order to protect her, Oliver decides to cut his contact with her as the vigilante. Diggle presents evidence to Oliver that his mother is connected to the group he is hunting and that she also knew of Robert's yacht. Oliver goes to interrogate his mother as the vigilante. In flashbacks, Oliver meets Slade Wilson, an Australian Intelligence operative who came to the island to free Yao Fei. It is revealed that the masked mercenary who tortured Oliver was Wilson's partner, as Wilson has the same mask. He starts training Oliver to get him ready to infiltrate the airfield, the only apparent way out.
14	14	"The Odyssey"	John Behring	Story by : Greg Berlanti & Andrew Kreisberg; Teleplay by : Andrew Kreisberg & Marc Guggenheim	February 13, 2013	2J7314	3.29
Oliver is critically shot by Moira and escapes. He exposes his secret to Felicity and asks her to take him to his hideout. With Diggle's help, the bullet is removed and Oliver is stabilized. Felicity refuses to join Oliver's fight, but offers to help them find Steele. Oliver convinces Diggle to stop investigating Moira until they find out more about the organization. Flashbacks show Oliver being trained. Wilson reveals that his former partner, Billy Wintergreen, was sent with Wilson to find out Fyers' mission. Their plane was shot down and they were captured by Fyers' men. Wintergreen accepted Fyers' offer to change sides. After infiltrating the airstrip, Wilson explains his plan to send in an airstrike, wiping out Fyers' operation. Oliver heads out to save Yao, but is recaptured by Fyers. Before he can be executed, Wilson arrives, rescuing Oliver and killing Wintergreen. Although they miss the supply aircraft, Wilson and Oliver decide to continue to work together to get off the island, with Wilson stating that Fyers was hired by another party for a purpose. Yao is revealed to have changed sides because his daughter, Shado, is being held captive by Fyers.
15	15	"Dodger"	Eagle Egilsson	Beth Schwartz	February 20, 2013	2J7315	3.15
Oliver learns of a jewel thief named "Dodger" who uses hostages tagged with bomb collars. Felicity suggests that Oliver bug the phone of Detective McKenna Hall, an old friend of Oliver's, to gain information on Dodger. She also convinces Oliver to ask Hall out on a date so that he can have some downtime. Through the wiretap, Oliver determines Dodger's next location, but is stunned by a bomb thrown by the escaping thief. To draw out Dodger, Oliver donates antique jewels to an auction. It works but, when Felicity confronts the thief, he places a collar on her to ensure his getaway. Oliver manages to stop Dodger and deactivate the collar. Diggle starts dating his former sister-in-law, Carly. Thea has a run-in with a thief named Roy Harper. Moira makes a deal with Chien to have Malcolm killed so she can leave the secret organization, whose plan is called the "Undertaking". Flashbacks show Oliver trying to treat Wilson's infected wound by finding the herbs Yao used. He is intercepted by a wounded man who asks for help, but Oliver leaves him, believing it to be a trap.
16	16	"Dead to Rights"	Glen Winter	Geoff Johns	February 27, 2013	2J7316	3.17
Oliver kills a hired gunman and realizes that the latter's target is not yet safe. Chien hires Lawton, who survived Oliver's attack, to take out Malcolm after the previous gunman's death. Malcolm asks Tommy to attend an award ceremony where Malcolm will be receiving a humanitarian award; Tommy is persuaded by Oliver to attend. At the last moment, Oliver discovers that Malcolm is the target and races to the event to save him. Although he is almost caught by Hall, Oliver manages to get Malcolm away from Chien's men. Malcolm is shot with one of Lawton's poisonous bullets and Oliver is forced to reveal his identity to Tommy in order to help save Malcolm's life. Malcolm and Tommy reconcile. Malcolm tells Moira about his belief that someone from the organization attempted to murder him. Laurel is confronted by her mother, Dinah, who states that Sara, Laurel's sister, might still be alive. During a flashback, Oliver is shown repairing a damaged radio, which Wilson uses to tune into Fyers' radio communications. They find out that Fyers possesses an advanced anti-aircraft missile launcher.
17	17	"The Huntress Returns"	Guy Bee	Jake Coburn & Lana Cho	March 20, 2013	2J7317	3.02
Helena returns to Starling City to kill Frank after she learns that he plans to make a deal with the FBI for witness protection. Oliver opens his nightclub, Verdant, and refuses her request for help; she attacks Tommy to force his assistance. Helena is captured by the police's trap. Oliver breaks her out to protect his secret and demands that she leave Starling City. Instead, she forces Felicity to find Frank's location. Oliver manages to stop Helena from murdering Frank but, when Hall arrives, Helena shoots her and escapes. In the hospital, Hall breaks up with Oliver, announcing that she is moving to Coast City for her physical therapy. Meanwhile, Tommy's knowledge of Oliver's secret is affecting his relationship with Laurel, but Tommy reconciles with Oliver. Dinah presents her evidence of Sara's existence to Quentin and Laurel. Thea and Roy get closer. In a flashback to the island, Oliver and Wilson steal the circuit board of the anti-aircraft missile launcher, which the latter states can start a war, and offer Fyers a trade of the board for a way off the island.
18	18	"Salvation"	Nick Copus	Drew Z. Greenberg & Wendy Mericle	March 27, 2013	2J7318	2.65
Another vigilante appears in Starling City and kidnaps one of Oliver's targets, a slumlord who had charges dropped against him because he was able to pay off the District Attorney. The new vigilante, who is identified as Joseph Falk, kills the slumlord over a live broadcast. Falk murders several prosecutors the same way before going after Harper. Diggle finds out that Falk is using an abandoned subway car; Oliver is able to catch the car and kill Falk. Oliver realizes the secret organization's plan involves The Glades, a neighborhood filled with crime. Laurel proves to Dinah and Quentin that Sara is not alive. It is revealed that Dinah knew of Sara's plan to escape with Oliver. Malcolm contacts the Triad to find the traitors. Moira turns over her co-conspirator, Frank Chen, to Malcolm, who kills Chen, believing her to be innocent. Flashbacks to the island show Oliver and Wilson freeing Shado, but at the cost of Fyers reacquiring the board. She claims to know Fyers' scheme.
19	19	"Unfinished Business"	Michael Offer	Bryan Q. Miller & Lindsey Allen	April 3, 2013	2J7319	2.92
When a girl dies after using a new form of Vertigo, Oliver sets out to interrogate the Count and determines the latter has lost his mind from the Vertigo overdose Oliver gave him. When news reports state that the Count escaped the asylum, Oliver suspects that the Count was faking his mental illness. Meanwhile, Quentin finds loose connections between Tommy and Vertigo. Attempting to uncover the truth almost leads to him discovering Oliver's hideout. Oliver realizes that the Count's psychiatrist is behind the re-emergence of Vertigo. Oliver kills the doctor and opts not to kill the Count, who has truly lost his mind and was the fall guy for the doctor's actions. Tommy quits the club after learning that Oliver suspected him of drug dealing; Malcolm gives him a job. Oliver decides to help Diggle find Lawton, the man who murdered Diggle's brother. In a flashback, Shado reveals that Yao Fei took the blame for a massacre committed by the Chinese government and was subsequently exiled to the island. Now, Fyers is using him as a scapegoat for his schemes. She begins training Oliver to use a bow.
20	20	"Home Invasion"	Ken Fink	Ben Sokolowski & Beth Schwartz	April 24, 2013	2J7320	3.10
Laurel represents the Moore family in suing a corrupt businessman, Edward Rasmus, who then puts a hit on the family; the couple's young child is the sole survivor. Laurel takes the boy into her custody and is saved by the vigilante from the hitman's attempt to finish the job. Tommy suggests that they go to Oliver's for protection. An operation headed up by A.R.G.U.S., a government organization, is set to capture Lawton, but Oliver chooses the Moores' case. As a result, Lawton escapes and Diggle decides to leave Oliver, who forces Rasmus to confess his crimes, leading to the latter's arrest. After murdering Rasmus, the hitman heads to the Queen residence to kill all the remaining witnesses, but Oliver manages to kill him. Tommy opts to leave Laurel, believing that he could never compete with Oliver should she discover him to be the vigilante. Elsewhere, Roy starts searching for the vigilante and Thea agrees to help. During a flashback to the island, Shado continues teaching Oliver to use a bow and Yao Fei brings Fyers' men to the hideout.
21	21	"The Undertaking"	Michael Schultz	Jake Coburn & Lana Cho	May 1, 2013	2J7321	2.89
Oliver tracks down an accountant for the secret organization and steals his laptop. While decrypting it, Felicity uncovers a link to Walter—a money transfer was made to Dominic Alonzo, an underground casino owner who was hired to kidnap Walter. The pair infiltrate the casino and Alonzo claims that Walter is dead. Oliver informs his family and Moira confronts Malcolm, who proves to her that Walter is still alive. Oliver, who was listening in, discovers that Malcolm is heading the secret organization and uses Felicity to ascertain Walter's location. As the vigilante, Oliver frees Walter. Meanwhile, Laurel asks Tommy for the truth about why he left and Tommy states that Oliver still loves her, a claim Oliver confirms. Oliver asks Diggle to help him stop the "Undertaking". In a flashback, Robert is shown disagreeing with Malcolm's proposal, which would involve leveling the Glades with a machine five years hence, killing thousands of people in order to rebuild the area. As a result, Malcolm has a bomb planted on the Queens' yacht, right before Robert boards it for China with a plan to stop Malcolm.
22	22	"Darkness on the Edge of Town"	John Behring	Drew Z. Greenberg & Wendy Mericle	May 8, 2013	2J7322	2.62
Malcolm kills the scientists who worked on the machine. Diggle, disguised as the vigilante, kidnaps Oliver and Moira, a ruse by Oliver to uncover the truth. The plan works and Oliver's team breaks into Malcolm's company for information. Quentin finally approves Laurel's feelings for Oliver, who realizes that he can cease being the vigilante if he stops the Undertaking. Thus, Oliver reconciles his romance with Laurel and the two make love, which Tommy happens to witness. Malcolm has the device moved. Oliver attempts to kill him and Malcolm reveals that he is the other archer; the two fight until Malcolm gets the upper hand, discovering Oliver's secret. Meanwhile, Walter files for divorce, citing his knowledge of Moira's involvement in his kidnapping. Roy wants to be trained by the vigilante and pushes Thea away from himself. In a flashback, the man Oliver chose not to help is working for Fyers, who plans to cripple the Chinese economy by blowing up commercial planes going into the country. Fyers' employer is shown to be a woman. He murders Yao Fei after forcing him to take credit for the attacks via video recording.
23	23	"Sacrifice"	David Barrett	Story by : Greg Berlanti; Teleplay by : Marc Guggenheim & Andrew Kreisberg	May 15, 2013	2J7323	2.77
Malcolm imprisons Oliver, who later manages to escape. The latter confronts Moira about the Undertaking, which prompts her to hold a press conference for the city about her involvement with Malcolm and the plan to destroy the Glades, resulting in her arrest. Malcolm confirms her claims to Tommy and reveals that he is the other archer. Quentin, with help from Felicity, is able to dismantle the device. Diggle and Oliver go after and mortally wound Malcolm, who states that there is a second machine just before he dies. The device activates and begins to level the east side of the Glades. Thea goes to the Glades to save Roy, who decides to stay and help others. Laurel is stuck in her office, but Tommy arrives and helps her escape before being trapped himself. Oliver arrives too late, as Tommy has already been mortally wounded by debris. The two tearfully make amends with each other before Tommy dies, leaving Oliver grief-stricken. In a flashback, Fyers fires a missile at an approaching airliner, but Oliver and Shado manage to override the coordinates and destroy the missile. Afterward, Oliver kills Fyers, having gained relative skill with a bow.

== Cast and characters ==
=== Main ===
- Stephen Amell as Oliver Queen / The Hood
- Katie Cassidy as Laurel Lance
- Colin Donnell as Tommy Merlyn
- David Ramsey as John Diggle
- Willa Holland as Thea Queen
- Susanna Thompson as Moira Queen
- Paul Blackthorne as Quentin Lance

=== Recurring ===
- Jamey Sheridan as Robert Queen
- Kelly Hu as Chien Na Wei / China White
- Emily Bett Rickards as Felicity Smoak (Note: In addition to an uncredited role in "Year's End", Rickards also co-starred in two episodes.)
- John Barrowman as Malcolm Merlyn / Dark Archer
- Jessica De Gouw as Helena Bertinelli / Huntress
- Colin Salmon as Walter Steele
- Annie Ilonzeh as Joanna De La Vega
- Roger Cross as Lucas Hilton
- Byron Mann as Yao Fei
- Janina Gavankar as McKenna Hall
- Manu Bennett as Slade Wilson
- Christie Laing as Carly Diggle (Note: Laing co-starred in two episodes before she was promoted to recurring in the ninth episode.)
- Colton Haynes as Roy Harper
- Alex Kingston as Dinah Lance
- Jeffrey Nordling as Frank Bertinelli
- Sebastian Dunn as Edward Fyers
- Celina Jade as Shado
- Chin Han as Frank Chen
- Adrian Holmes as Frank Pike
- Jarod Joseph as Alan Durand

=== Guest ===
- Kathleen Gati as Raisa
- Michael Rowe as Floyd Lawton / Deadshot (Note: Also credited as a co-star in two episodes.)
- Kyle Schmid as Kyle Reston / Ace
- Tahmoh Penikett as Nick Salvati
- Brian Markinson as Adam Hunt
- Jacqueline MacInnes Wood as Sara Lance
- Emma Bell as Emily Nocenti
- Andrew Dunbar as Garfield Lynns / Firefly
- Ben Browder as Ted Gaynor / Blackhawk
- Seth Gabel as Cecil Adams / The Count
- Chelah Horsdal as Kate Spencer
- Currie Graham as Derek Reston / King
- Sarah-Jane Redmond as Mrs. Reston / Queen
- David Anders as Cyrus Vanch
- John Cassini as Russo
- James Callis as Winnick Norton / Dodger
- Danny Nucci as Raynes
- Ona Grauer as Vivian
- Audrey Marie Anderson as Lyla Michaels
- J. August Richards as Mr. Blank / Onomatopoeia
- Steve Aoki as himself

== Production ==
On January 12, 2012, The CW was preparing a new series centered around the character Green Arrow, developed by Andrew Kreisberg, Greg Berlanti and Marc Guggenheim. A week later, the series, now known as Arrow, was ordered to pilot, which was directed by David Nutter, who also directed the pilot for Smallville, a series following Clark Kent on his journey to become Superman. At the end of the month, Stephen Amell was cast in the titular role of Oliver Queen. When developing the series, producer Marc Guggenheim expressed that the creative team wanted to "chart [their] own course, [their] own destiny", and avoid any direct connections to Smallville, which featured its own Green Arrow/Oliver Queen (Justin Hartley), opting to cast a new actor in the role of Oliver Queen. Unlike with Smallville, the series does not initially feature super-powered heroes and villains. Instead, the creative still took inspiration from Smallville, as one of the main themes of Arrow was to "look at the humanity" of Oliver Queen, as Smallville had done with Clark Kent. The decision not to include superpowers was, in part, based on the executives' desire to take a realistic look at the characters in this universe. The series was given a full season pick up on October 22, 2012.

"I think the idea is to—not all the time, and not with a set regularity—but I think it is critical to explore how he went from the person that he was when he left the island—which is extremely different: he's spoiled, he's entitled, he's a bit of a jerk—and he comes off it something very, very different. So we're going to explore how he gets there."

— Stephen Amell on the use of flashback storytelling.

The series develops relationship triangles: some love triangles, others designed to catch characters in "philosophical debates". Kreisberg provides one such example: "Every week, Oliver will be facing a bad guy, but the truth is, his real nemesis is Detective Lance, who's trying to bring him into justice.[...] His daughter is going to be caught in the middle, because she loves and respects her father, and she's always believed in what he believed, but at the same time, she's going to see this dark urban legend out there that's actually doing a lot of good; the kind of good that she wants to be doing in her role as a legal aid attorney." Learning from previous experiences working in television, the producers worked early on identifying the major story arcs for the series, specifically the first season, including "mapping out" how to accomplish them. Taking inspiration from Christopher Nolan's Batman film series, the creative team decided to "put it all out there" and "not hold back" from episode to episode.

The team strives to include various DC Comics characters and aspects of the DC universe. Guggenheim cited Big Belly Burger, a restaurant franchise introduced in the Superman comics, which appears in Arrow's third episode and onward. Kreisberg said, "There are so many characters in the DC Universe who haven't gotten their due in TV and film. We're so excited to reach into [the DC comics] roster and take some of these lesser-known characters that are beloved by fans, and do our spin on the characters."

=== Casting ===
On January 31, 2012 Stephen Amell became the first actor to be cast, having previously appeared on other CW dramas such as The Vampire Diaries and 90210. Fan reaction to Amell's casting was mixed, with many fans wanting Justin Hartley to reprise his role from Smallville. Amell was one of the first actors to audition for the role of Oliver Queen, and Kreisberg felt that he "hit the target from the outset" and "everyone else just paled in comparison". Arrow's pilot script was the first Amell auditioned for during pilot season, having received multiple scripts at the start of the year. Producer Marc Guggenheim expressed that the creative team wanted to "chart [their] own course, [their] own destiny", and avoid any direct connections to Smallville, which featured its own Green Arrow/Oliver Queen who was portrayed by Hartley. Instead, they opted to cast a new actor in the titular role. Amell, who was already in shape from Rent-a-Goalie, did physical fitness training at Tempest Freerunning Academy out of Reseda, California. He received archery training as well, which included watching a video on how archery has been displayed inaccurately or poorly in television and film before learning the basics of shooting a bow. For Amell, the appeal of portraying Queen was that he saw multiple roles tied to the same character: "There's Queen the casual playboy; Queen the wounded hero; Queen the brooding Hamlet; Queen the lover; Queen the man of action, and so on."

Developing chemistry

Amy Brenneman made a point of really befriending me before we started shooting [Private Practice] [...] I was really taken with how she connected with me, person to person, before we tried to connect, actor to actor. So, I made a real point to do that [with the Arrow cast] [...] I think that you can see that [we hit it off] [...] If you have to put your hand on somebody's shoulder, if you've done it before, it makes it easier to do. Sometimes it's imperceptible, but I think it's what takes things from good to great, or from 2D to 3D.

— Amell interview with Collider

A week later, David Ramsey was cast as the original character John Diggle, named after the Green Arrow: Year One writer Andy Diggle. Ramsey enjoyed the fact that he did not have to worry about matching the comic books. It allowed him to "just kind of take [his character], and run with it". On February 14, 2012 Susanna Thompson was cast as Moira Queen. The following day, Katie Cassidy and Willa Holland were announced to play Laurel Lance and Thea Queen, respectively. Laurel Lance is an attorney and Oliver's ex-girlfriend, named after Dinah Laurel Lance, who "may or may not end up being the Black Canary with time". Cassidy said she was drawn to the show by Berlanti, Nutter, Kreisberg, and Guggenheim, whom she called smart, creative, and edgy. Hollands' character is described as "Oliver's celebutante younger sister who's testing the boundaries of acceptable behavior". She is partially based on the character Mia Dearden, sharing her middle name, using Mia as an alias in Season 3 and taking the codename "Speedy" in the season 3 finale. Subsequently. Brian Markinson was cast as guest-star villain Adam Hunt, described as "Hunt is a corrupt businessman who is ripping off some people – behavior that has gotten the attention of Dinah Laurel Lance and her CNRI firm". On February 21, 2012, Colin Donnell was cast as Tommy Merlyn, named after Green Arrow's archenemy Merlyn. He is described as "Oliver's best friend, a playboy "trustafarian" who assumes the good times will roll again now that Oliver has returned, only to learn Oliver is a changed man". On March 2, 2012, Paul Blackthorne and Jamey Sheridan were cast as Quentin Lance and Robert Queen, the fathers of Laurel and Oliver respectively, with Blackthorne being the last regular cast member to be cast. Jacqueline MacInnes Wood was cast as Sara Lance, Laurel's sister, for the pilot. However, when the character returned in the second season, Wood was replaced by Caity Lotz. In August, it was announced that John Barrowman would be joining the series in an unspecified recurring role. In the same month Emily Bett Rickards was cast in the role of Felicity Smoak initially as a one-off guest star, but confirmed as a series regular in January 2013.

=== Design ===
"Arrow, we really wanted him urban, and sexy, and you could almost wear the costume down the street and it would look cool in today's world. That was a big goal with Arrow and the way the story was set up with his character."

— Costume Designer Colleen Atwood

The realistic approach to the series included the costume design for Oliver's vigilante persona, created by Colleen Atwood. According to Amell, it was important for the suit to be functional, and the best way that he knew for that was if he could put the costume on by himself: "If I can put it on by myself, I think that people will buy it. And that was our idea. That's our world. My boots are actually Nike Frees, which is kind of cool. It's leather and it's tight and it's aggressive, but I can move in it. People will like it." David Nutter, the director of the pilot episode, said that "We're creating a real, believable world in which Oliver Queen can do incredible things. Colleen Atwood's great work on the Arrow costume reflects that effort."

=== Filming ===
Production on the pilot began in March 2012 in Vancouver, British Columbia, Canada. The series features two distinct timelines which requires more specific planning in the filming schedule. Filming for the island flashbacks takes place in Vancouver's Whytecliff Park area, near beachfront homes. The production team is tasked with keeping the buildings out of camera frame. Additionally, producer Marc Guggenheim finds the process arduous: "Stephen [Amell] has to wear a wig, and his look has to be changed... there's a lot. It's actually incredibly ambitious to do these flashbacks every week, every single episode. Because like Andrew [Kreisberg] said, it's almost like it's its own show." Hatley Castle, located in Royal Roads University was used for exterior shots for the Queen family mansion. Hatley Castle had previously been used as the Luthor ancestral home in Smallville. Vancouver's Terminal City Ironworks Complex doubles as the exterior for Queen Industrial, Inc, in which Oliver sets up his hideout and later his club Verdant. It has also been used on several other occasions, such as the warehouse in which Oliver and Tommy are kidnapped in the pilot episode, or the base of operations for the Chinese Triad in episode 108 "Vendetta".

Filming for the rest of the season commenced on July 18, 2012, and finalized on April 18, 2013.

=== Music ===
Arrow – Original Television Soundtrack: Season 1

Soundtrack album by Blake Neely
- Released: September 17, 2013
- Length: 77:35
- Label: WaterTower Music

Blake Neely chronology
Arrow – Original Television Soundtrack: Season 1	Arrow – Original Television Soundtrack: Season 2

To compose the score for Arrow, executive producer Greg Berlanti invited Blake Neely, with whom he had first worked with on Everwood, Neely created a score that combined electronic and orchestral cues, varying between action themes and romantic ones. Berlanti told Neely the series would be dark, and the music should be as well. After reading the pilot script, Neely went away to start composing on his own. According to Neely, "Of course, Oliver has his main theme but also sub-themes for the many layers of his character. He and Laurel have a love theme. Mom had a theme for the Undertaking. The bad guys all have themes, which makes it sad for me when one of them dies. So I try not to become attached to bad guy themes. Diggle has a theme. Even the Island itself has a theme." The soundtrack was released on September 17, 2013. It was composed by Blake Neely.

Arrow – Original Television Soundtrack: Season 1 tack listing
No.	Title	Length
1.	"Five Years"	1:54
2.	"Returning Home / Scars"	2:53
3.	"City in Ruin"	1:20
4.	"Setting Up the Lair"	2:27
5.	"Loss and Regrets"	2:38
6.	"On the List"	1:40
7.	"Vigilante Justice"	2:10
8.	"Honor Thy Father"	1:45
9.	"Inhospitable Island / Deathstroke"	2:09
10.	"I Forgot Who I Was"	4:00
11.	"Train and Hunt"	2:38
12.	"Betrayed By Those You Love"	1:51
13.	"Chasing the Hood"	2:27
14.	"Damaged"	1:39
15.	"The Dark Archer / It Is I Who Failed This City"	3:31
16.	"Working Together But Alone"	1:53
17.	"The Count"	2:02
18.	"Friends in Arms"	2:36
19.	"Trust But Verify"	2:37
20.	"Join Us"	1:55
21.	"Trusting a Friend, Saving an Enemy"	1:57
22.	"Sins of the Father"	1:27
23.	"I Can't Lose You Twice"	3:17
24.	"Search for Salvation"	3:29
25.	"Shado Sees an Emerging Hero"	1:57
26.	"Unfinished Business / Saving Walter"	2:29
27.	"A Way Off the Island"	2:15
28.	"Sacrifice"	4:52
29.	"Oliver Queen Suite"	9:47
Total length:		1:17:35

== Release ==
=== Broadcast ===
The season began airing in the United States on The CW on October 10, 2012, and completed its 23-episode run on May 5, 2013.

=== Home media ===
Arrow: Season 1 was released as a 5-disc DVD set and as a 9-disc Blu-ray and DVD combo pack set on September 17, 2013, in the United States and September 23, 2013, in the United Kingdom. The DVD and Blu-ray box sets contain additional features, including making-of featurettes, deleted scenes, gag reel, and highlights from the Paley Fest 2012.

== Reception ==
=== Critical response ===
The first season received favorable reviews, with a Metacritic score of 73 out of 100, based on reviews from 25 critics, making it the highest rated CW show in five years. Review aggregator website Rotten Tomatoes calculated an approval rating of 85%, based on 285 reviews. The site's consensus reads: "The CW nails the target with Arrow, a comic book-inspired series that benefits from cinematic action sequences, strong plotting, and intriguing characters."

Mary McNamara of the Los Angeles Times called the series an interesting setup with a quality look, describing Amell as "a poster boy (no doubt literally) for the Katniss Everdeen set." Brian Lowry at Variety described the series as a "handsome but stiff surrogate for Batman that could benefit from sharper execution." In reviewing the final episode of the first season, Alasdair Wilkins of The A.V. Club gave the season as a whole a rating of B+, noting that the show "hasn't quite figured everything out yet, but it's had some standout episodes."

=== Ratings ===
Arrow's premiere episode drew 4.14 million viewers, making it The CW's most-watched telecast of any show on any night in three years, and The CW's most-watched series premiere since The Vampire Diaries in 2009. In its second episode, Arrow became the only new network drama in the 2012–13 season to hold its ratings in both adults 18–34 and adults 18–49 from its premiere to its second week. The first season finished as the 130th ranked show, with an average viewership of 3.68 million. In Australia, the premiere received 1.32 million viewers, making it the third most-watched broadcast on the network that night. The UK broadcast was the highest-rated telecast of the week on Sky 1, with 1.85 million viewers. In Canada, the first episode got 1.32 million viewers, making it the fourth most-watched airing of the night and the twenty-third of the week.

Viewership and ratings per episode of Arrow season 1
No.	Title	Air date	Rating/share (18–49)	Viewers (millions)	DVR (18–49)	Total (18–49)
1	"Pilot"	October 10, 2012	1.3	4.14	0.4	1.7
2	"Honor Thy Father"	October 17, 2012	1.3	3.55	—N/a	—N/a
3	"Lone Gunmen"	October 24, 2012	1.1	3.51	—N/a	—N/a
4	"An Innocent Man"	October 31, 2012	1.0/3	3.05	0.5	1.5
5	"Damaged"	November 7, 2012	1.3/4	3.75	—N/a	—N/a
6	"Legacies"	November 14, 2012	1.2/3	3.83	—N/a	—N/a
7	"Muse of Fire"	November 28, 2012	1.3/4	3.74	—N/a	—N/a
8	"Vendetta"	December 5, 2012	1.1/3	3.35	—N/a	—N/a
9	"Year's End"	December 12, 2012	1.0/3	3.11	0.5	1.5
10	"Burned"	January 16, 2013	1.1/3	3.06	0.5	1.6
11	"Trust But Verify"	January 23, 2013	1.1/3	3.14	—N/a	—N/a
12	"Vertigo"	January 30, 2013	0.9/3	2.97	0.5	1.4
13	"Betrayal"	February 6, 2013	1.0/3	2.96	0.5	1.5
14	"The Odyssey"	February 13, 2013	1.1/3	3.29	—N/a	—N/a
15	"Dodger"	February 20, 2013	0.9/3	3.15	0.5	1.4
16	"Dead to Rights"	February 27, 2013	1.0/3	3.17	—N/a	—N/a
17	"The Huntress Returns"	March 20, 2013	1.0/3	3.02	—N/a	—N/a
18	"Salvation"	March 27, 2013	0.9/3	2.65	0.5	1.4
19	"Unfinished Business"	April 3, 2013	0.9/3	2.92	0.4	1.3
20	"Home Invasion"	April 24, 2013	1.0/3	3.10	0.5	1.5
21	"The Undertaking"	May 1, 2013	0.9/3	2.89	—N/a	—N/a
22	"Darkness on the Edge of Town"	May 8, 2013	0.9/3	2.62	—N/a	—N/a
23	"Sacrifice"	May 15, 2013	0.9/3	2.77	0.4	1.3

=== Accolades ===
Award nominations for Arrow season 1
Year	Award	Category	Nominee(s)	Result	Ref.
2012	IGN Awards	Best TV Hero	Oliver Queen (Stephen Amell)	Nominated	
2012	Satellite Awards	Satellite Award for Best Television Series – Genre	Arrow	Nominated	
2013	Broadcast Music, Inc.	BMI Television Music Awards	Blake Neely	Won	
2013	Canadian Society of Cinematography Awards	TV Drama Cinematography	Glen Winter ("Pilot")	Won	
2013	Canadian Society of Cinematography Awards	TV series Cinematography	Glen Winter ("Vendetta")	Nominated	
2013	Leo Awards	Best Casting Dramatic Series	Coreen Mayrs, Heike Brandstatter ("An Innocent Man")	Nominated	
2013	Leo Awards	Best Cinematography Dramatic Series	Gordon Verheul ("Lone Gunmen")	Nominated	
2013	Leo Awards	Best Cinematography Dramatic Series	Glen Winter ("Pilot")	Won	
2013	Leo Awards	Best Dramatic Series	Joseph Patrick Finn, Greg Berlanti, Marc Guggenheim, Andrew Kreisberg, Melissa Kellner Berman, Drew Greenberg, Jennifer Lence, Wendy Mericle, Carl Ogawa	Nominated	
2013	Leo Awards	Best Production Design Dramatic Series	Richard Hudolin ("Pilot")	Won	
2013	Leo Awards	Best Stunt Coordination Dramatic Series	J. J. Makaro ("Pilot")	Won	
2013	Leo Awards	Best Stunt Coordination Dramatic Series	J. J. Makaro ("Vertigo")	Nominated	
2013	Leo Awards	Best Visual Effects Dramatic Series	Jean-Luc Dinsdale, Pauline Burns, Andrew Orloff, Dave Gauthier ("Burned")	Won	
2013	NewNowNext Awards	Best New Indulgence	Arrow	Nominated	
2013	NewNowNext Awards	Cause You're Hot	Stephen Amell	Nominated	
2013	People's Choice Awards	Favorite New TV Drama	Arrow	Nominated	
2013	Saturn Awards	Best Youth-Oriented Series on Television	Arrow	Nominated	
2013	Teen Choice Awards	Choice Breakout TV Show	Arrow	Nominated	
2013	Teen Choice Awards	Choice Breakout TV Star	Stephen Amell	Nominated	
2013	Teen Choice Awards	Choice Sci-Fi/Fantasy TV Actor	Stephen Amell	Nominated	
2013	Teen Choice Awards	Choice Sci-Fi/Fantasy TV Actress	Katie Cassidy	Nominated	
2013	Teen Choice Awards	Choice Sci-Fi/Fantasy TV Show	Arrow	Nominated	
2013	UBCP/ACTRA Awards	Best Newcomer	Emily Bett Rickards	Nominated	
