= John Diggle (Arrowverse) =

Fictional character in the Arrowverse

- Arrowverse and Superman & Lois character
- David Ramsey as John Diggle in his Spartan suit as seen in the sixth season of Arrow
- First appearance: Arrowverse version: "Pilot"; Arrow Season 1×1; October 10, 2012 Superman & Lois version: "Through the Valley of Death"; Superman & Lois Season 1×12; July 14, 2021
- Last appearance: "It's My Party and I'll Die If I Want To"; The Flash; April 29, 2023
- Created by: Greg Berlanti; Marc Guggenheim; Andrew Kreisberg
- Portrayed by: David Ramsey

In-universe information
- Full name: John Thomas Diggle
- Aliases: Freelancer; Spartan; Green Arrow (formerly)
- Occupation: Soldier; Bodyguard; Minister; Vigilante; Counter-terrorism operative
- Affiliation: U.S. Army (formerly); Team Arrow (formerly); Suicide Squad (formerly); A.R.G.U.S.
- Weapon: Green Monster (crossbow)
- Family: Roy Stewart (stepfather); Andy Diggle (brother)
- Spouse: Lyla Michaels
- Children: Sara Diggle (biological daughter); John Diggle Jr. (biological son); Connor Hawke (adoptive son)

John Thomas Diggle, also known by his code names Freelancer (with the Suicide Squad) and Spartan (with Team Arrow), is a fictional character in The CW's Arrowverse franchise and Superman & Lois, first introduced in the 2012 pilot episode of the television series Arrow. The character was created for the series by Greg Berlanti, Marc Guggenheim, and Andrew Kreisberg. Diggle is portrayed by David Ramsey.

Diggle is introduced as a military veteran and Oliver Queen's new bodyguard. Over time, his relationship with Oliver evolves and he becomes his best friend and confidante in his crusade as the Green Arrow, joining him as Spartan and for a while succeeds him as the Green Arrow. After Oliver returns as the Green Arrow, he leaves the team and joins A.R.G.U.S. In Superman & Lois, an alternate Diggle is depicted as an affiliate of Clark Kent and Lois Lane, and an ally of John Henry Irons.

Ramsey has reprised his role in the subsequent Arrowverse series The Flash, Legends of Tomorrow, Supergirl and Batwoman, as well as the non-Arrowverse series Superman & Lois. The character also appears in Arrow's tie-in novels and digital comics, as well as the Lego Batman 3: Beyond Gotham video game. While Diggle was originally created for the television series, since 2013, a character of the same name has appeared in the Green Arrow series published by DC Comics.

== Creation and casting ==
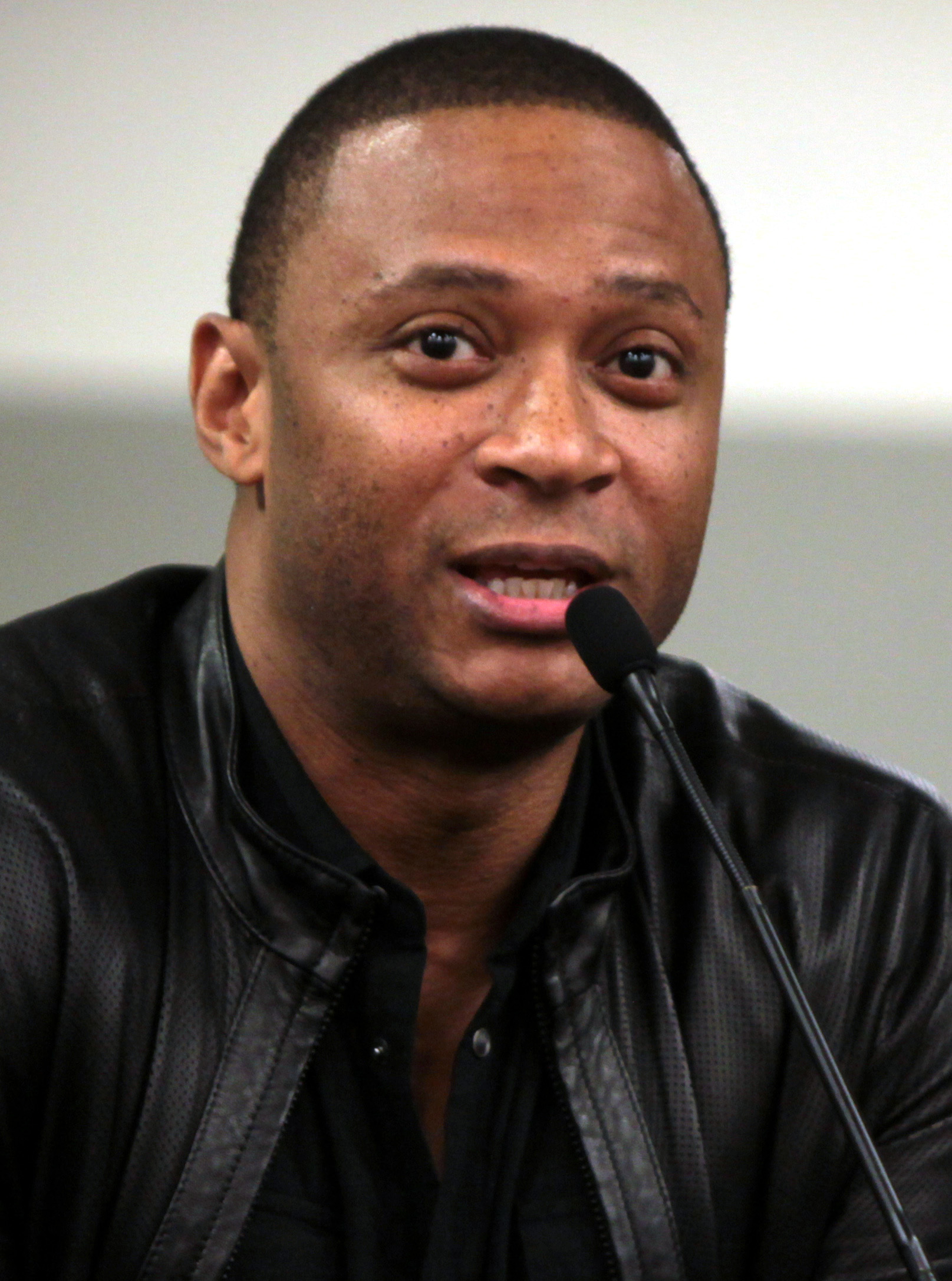
Actor David Ramsey speaking about Arrow at Phoenix Comic con in 2014

In February 2012, David Ramsey was cast in the pilot episode of Arrow as John Diggle, a "former military man now working as a bodyguard for hire who soon finds he is trapped in a battle of wits, loyalty and trust". The character was created by Arrow creators Greg Berlanti, Marc Guggenheim and Andrew Kreisberg. Named after comic book writer Andy Diggle, and created specifically for the series, Guggenheim said Diggle was designed to be Oliver Queen's (Stephen Amell) equal in "many respects" such as their abilities and intelligence. He further explained that Diggle's mutual abilities were a means of setting him up early in the series as a confidant for Oliver's vigilante persona. Ramsey enjoyed the fact that he did not have to worry about matching the comic books, saying, it allowed him to "just kind of take [his character] and run with it".

== Development ==
=== Characterization ===
David Ramsey has compared Diggle to Alfred Pennyworth from the Batman comics, describing the character as Oliver's "moral voice". Ramsey, who has trained in various martial arts such as Wing Chun, Jeet Kune Do, and kickboxing, used his martial arts expertise to make Diggle believable, saying, "I think, honestly, it has to do with...having Diggle able to not just handle himself on screen but be able to really proficiently use the (martial) arts — and look like he is a trained soldier. You don't see the stunt guy. You actually see David Ramsey doing it." He has stated that since Diggle is older than most of Team Arrow and, to an extent, more experienced on the field and reconnaissance fighting, the other members "look to him for some leadership". While describing the other Arrow characters, particularly Team Arrow members like Felicity Smoak (Emily Bett Rickards) as "extraordinary", Ramsey said people would be able to identify with Diggle because "he's just a guy who decided to better himself." He also said Diggle is not "a goody-two-shoes, but he'll stand up in your face and tell you the right way to get something done." Ramsey also compared Diggle to Little John, a character in various Robin Hood stories. A running gag is that Diggle, whenever taken suddenly to places by Barry Allen / Flash at super-speed, vomits as a result of motion sickness, an exception being in the Arrow season 6 episode "The Devil's Greatest Trick". Diggle's military career and heroism led some fans to draw comparisons between him and Green Lantern John Stewart. In 2015, Ramsey confirmed there had been talks of turning Diggle into "John Diggle Stewart". This was referenced in the 2018 "Elseworlds" crossover event, where Barry Allen of Earth-90 indicates that on his Earth, Diggle is the Green Lantern. A 2019 episode of Arrow reveals that Diggle has an estranged stepfather whose surname is Stewart. The series finale of Arrow features a scene where Diggle witnesses a meteor crash, and finds a box emitting a green light, which Ramsey said was a reference to fan theories that Diggle would become the series' version of Green Lantern.

=== Relationships ===
Regarding Diggle's relationship with Oliver in season 1 after realizing he is a vigilante, Ramsey said that "the biggest change is that they start working together", adding that, "He [Diggle] makes it clear to Oliver that this isn't about me being a yes man. This is about me understanding what you do and what it does to you as a person. What it does to your humanity." After Diggle leaves Team Arrow and joins A.R.G.U.S. in season 6 due to his differences with Oliver, Ramsey said, "he obviously loves Oliver, but he sees that there's more than one way to save the city. He's still committed to Oliver, to a certain degree, but even more so than Oliver, to the people of the city."

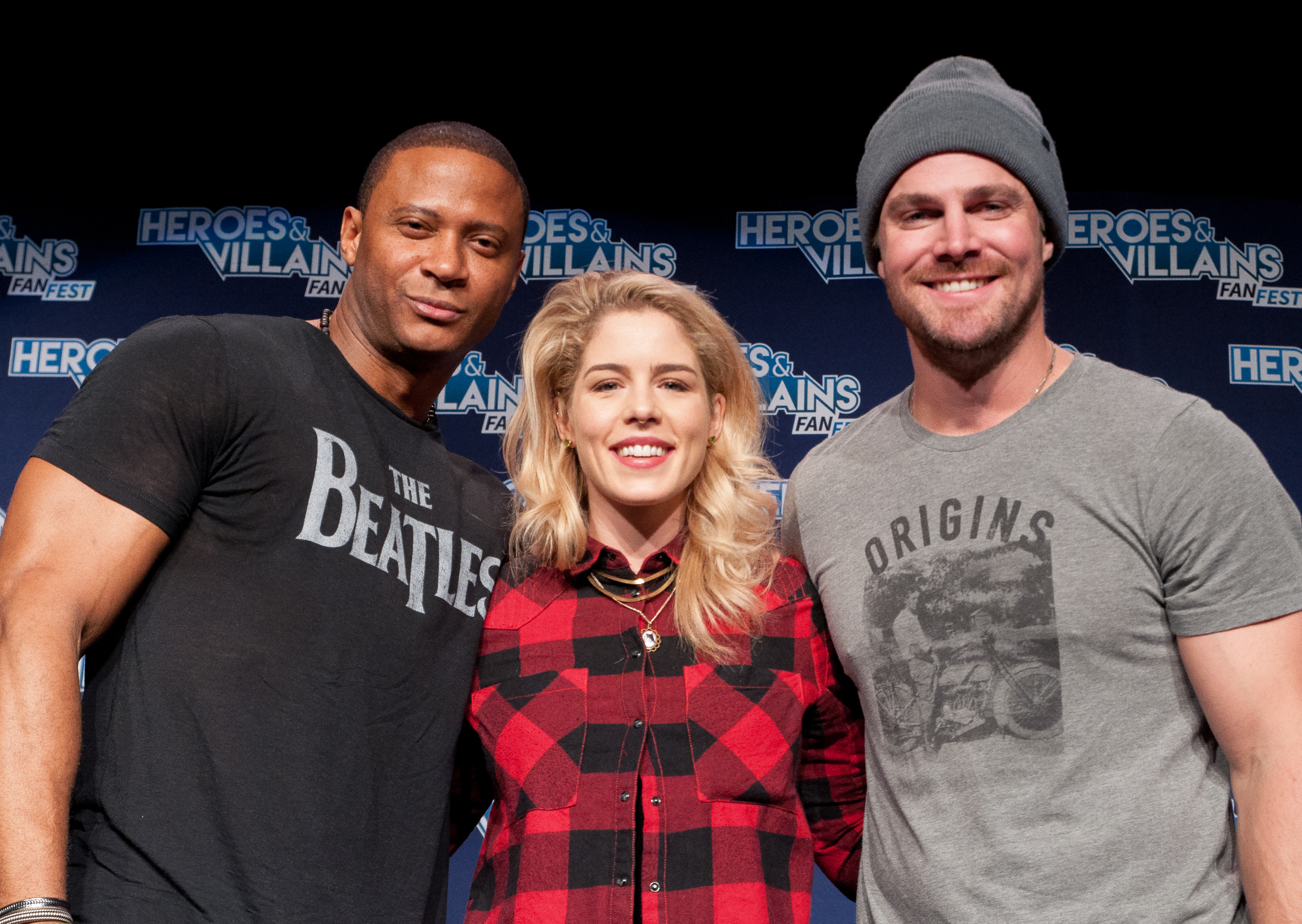
Ramsey, Rickards and Amell at Heroes and Villains Fan Fest San Jose in 2017

Diggle, alongside Felicity, is shown to play an important role in the transitioning of Oliver from a 'lone-wolf' to part of a vigilante team. This working relationship between these three characters has been described both in the media and the show as 'Original Team Arrow', and has received particular praise from critics. Commenting on this "symbiotic relationship", terming it "Arrow's most important", Carrie Raisler of The A.V. Club stated "Amell, Ramsey, and Rickards have the kind of lightning-in-a-bottle chemistry that makes all their scenes together hum", in her review of the first half of season 2. Similarly, Jesse Schedeen of IGN, reviewing the season three premiere, described the three as the "core trio" of the show and Jenny Rafferty of Vulture, writing about season four, described the relationship between the three as "the heartbeat of the show". Looking back at the series during her review of the season seven finale, Della Harrington of Den of Geek commented that "The magic of the show and the magic of his [Oliver's] team within the show alchemised when John Diggle and Felicity Smoak signed on."

Juliana Harkavy, who plays Dinah Drake, described Diggle as Drake's "best friend" and "her family".

=== Combat skills ===
Having served in the military, Diggle is well-versed in live combat, and his primary skill is marksmanship. He is also proficient in stick-fighting and knives. While his primary weapon of choice is a firearm, he is shown to be able to knock out people simply by striking them with his arms. He has also been shown to be on par with Oliver in fighting skills. Early in season 6, when Diggle takes up the Green Arrow mantle at Oliver's request, he wields a crossbow named "Green Monster" that was created by Felicity and Curtis and fires arrows.

=== Costume ===
For the first three seasons of Arrow, Diggle does not have a vigilante costume. By the time season 4 begins, he has gained one, which consists of a helmet and black gear. Via social media, the helmet was criticized by fans for its resemblance to that worn by the Marvel Comics character Magneto. In response to the criticism, Ramsey said, "I know there's a lot of criticism that it looks like the Magneto helmet. But by the time you see Diggle in action – we also get into what the helmet can do – you won't be thinking of the X-Men at all." In season 5, Diggle replaces his helmet with a new one, which Ramsey said can do "extraordinary things", apart from being just about concealment. Concept artist Andy Poon said the new helmet offers Diggle "full protection". He added that, since Diggle's codename is Spartan, he decided to make the helmet resemble "an actual spartan helmet design". Poon, a comic book fan himself, thought the new helmet would fix "the issues regarding some of the fan feedback about [the older helmet] looking similar to other comic book characters". Later in season 6, Diggle gains both a new Spartan costume and helmet, which eschew the gray overtones of previous Spartan costumes, and instead have a black and red scheme. In season 8, Diggle receives another suit, this time with a black and green color scheme as well as a green light emanating from his helmet as a nod to Green Lantern.

== Fictional character biography ==
=== Earth-Prime ===
==== Early life ====
John Thomas Diggle was born in 1977 in Starling City. He had a younger brother, Andy Diggle, but their relationship was always very tense. During his childhood, his father died on a military mission in Vlatava. He blamed his father's death on his step-father, who was in charge of the mission, Roy Stewart. Roy would train intensively both John and Andy on military combat. In 2003, he joined the United States Army, and was sent in Afghanistan, two years later becoming a Sergeant. When he discovered that Andy was a drug dealer, he beat him up, and convinced him to join the army. With both serving in Afghanistan, at some point Lt. Joyner offered them a deal to confiscate some of the opium they recovered and sell it off, a deal John refused, but not Andy. At some point, he met with Lyla Michaels in Afghanistan, and got married. At the end of his second tour, they divorced. John went back to Afghanistan for a third tour, while Lyla joined A.R.G.U.S. In 2008, he retired from the Army, and in 2010 he started working as a security guard, with his first job being protecting Tommy Merlyn. Sometime later, his brother was killed by Deadshot, and as a result he grew closer to his brother's widow, Carly Diggle.

==== Working with the Hood ====
In season 1, John Diggle was introduced as a former United States Army Ranger and United States Army Special Forces soldier, honorably discharged at the rank of Master Sergeant in the pilot episode. He is hired as the bodyguard of billionaire Oliver Queen by his mother, Moira and later becomes his confidant in his mission to save Starling City. Diggle tries to help Oliver balance his normal life and vigilante life, and occasionally helps him in the field. Diggle provides Oliver with medical assistance, limiting his need for hospital treatment. Already a skilled fighter, Diggle receives additional training from Oliver. Diggle has a grudge against Floyd Lawton / Deadshot who allegedly killed his brother, Andy. Diggle dates his brother's widow, Carly, and is a father figure to her son, Andrew "A.J.", during this season.

==== Joining the Suicide Squad ====
In season two Diggle and Felicity Smoak continue to help Oliver with his crusade and Diggle continues to be Oliver's adviser and field partner, along with Sara Lance and Roy Harper. Diggle has a relationship with his ex-wife Lyla Michaels, is an unofficial member of A.R.G.U.S., and a member of the Suicide Squad under the codename "Freelancer". He also develops an uneasy alliance with Amanda Waller who occasionally asks him for field assistance with A.R.G.U.S. missions. In the season finale, it is revealed that Lyla is pregnant with Diggle's child.

==== Fighting the League of Assassins ====
Diggle continues to help Oliver and his team during season three, but has to devote more of his time to his new baby with Lyla, whom he names Sara after Sara Lance is killed. After Lyla is seriously injured in an attack, they decide to remarry. When Oliver is presumed dead at Ra's al Ghul's hands, Diggle leads Felicity, Roy, and Laurel Lance until his friend's return. After Oliver's return, Diggle accompanies him to Nanda Parbat to help him free Malcolm Merlyn, but the two are captured. Diggle and Lyla marry after a near-death experience with the Suicide Squad, when Lawton sacrifices himself for them. Diggle and Lyla decide to quit Team Arrow and A.R.G.U.S. for their daughter's sake. After Oliver leaves the team to join the League of Assassins as part of a deal to revive a near-deceased Thea Queen, Diggle becomes the team leader, though he is not yet ready to forgive Oliver for kidnapping Lyla as part of a deception to gain acceptance by the League. In season one of The Flash, Diggle arrives at Central City with Oliver and Felicity to locate a criminal who uses lethal boomerangs (Digger Harkness), but ends up assisting Team Flash (Barry's team) in defeating Roy Bivolo.

==== Fighting Damien Darhk and Vandal Savage ====
Season four sees Diggle continuing to protect Starling City, now renamed Star City, with Laurel and Thea. Now going by the codename "Spartan", he discovers that the organization that targets the newly named Star City is H.I.V.E., who had hired Lawton to murder Andy. Diggle eventually forgives Oliver after their fight with a H.I.V.E. metahuman operative named Jeremy Tell. With Quentin Lance's help, Diggle learns that Damien Darhk had Andy murdered, and that he was a drug cartel leader and Darhk's territorial rival prior to his death. However, Diggle discovers that Darhk actually faked Andy's death and recruited him as a H.I.V.E. soldier, leading Diggle and his brother to become enemies. Guilt-ridden over his brother's role in causing Laurel's death, Diggle seeks revenge against Andy and Darhk. Diggle kills Andy after the latter threatens to harm Lyla and Sara. He initially lies to Lyla that he killed Andy in self-defense, but Oliver encourages Diggle to admit the truth to his wife. Diggle rejoins the army after confiding to his wife and Darhk's defeat.

In season two of The Flash, Diggle and the rest of Team Arrow aid Team Flash during their fight with Vandal Savage. Later in the season, when the metahuman King Shark escapes from his A.R.G.U.S. prison and arrives at Central City to kill Barry, Diggle and Lyla arrive to warn the latter. After King Shark is defeated by the combined efforts of Team Flash, Diggle and Lyla, he is taken back to A.R.G.U.S.

==== Stopping Adrian Chase and alien invasion ====
In the second episode of season five Diggle is betrayed by his commanding officer, J.G. Walker, following a failed attempt to sell nuclear weapons. Framed for Walker's crimes, Diggle is arrested. Oliver and Lyla break him out of state prison, and Diggle stays at H.I.V.E.'s former base until his innocence can be proven. Diggle remains guilty about killing Andy and continues to serve as Spartan to redeem himself. Due to the events of The Flash episode "Flashpoint", Diggle's family history is altered: his daughter Sara has been erased from existence and replaced by John "J.J." Diggle, Jr., as a result of a timeline change caused by Eobard Thawne, correcting the Flashpoint reality created by Barry Allen. Felicity is later able to prove Diggle's innocence by restoring the digital files that Walker had destroyed. However, Andy's betrayal and death at Diggle's hands has taken a toll on him; he struggles to control his rage and occasionally pulverizes criminals to vent it, fueling Oliver's concern over his erratic behavior. Diggle later befriends Oliver's chosen successor to Laurel's mantle, Dinah Drake, a Central City detective, and encourages her to set down roots in Star City. Diggle, along with the rest of Team Arrow, is later captured by Adrian Chase and taken to the island Lian Yu. Chase later detonates the explosive-rigged Lian Yu by shooting himself dead, with Diggle still on the island.

In season three of The Flash, Diggle joins forces with other superheroes to stop an alien invasion, while he learns of the alteration of his life with Lyla, his daughter's erasure and his son's status as a time aberration, and despite the hurt caused by these circumstances, he chooses to forgive Barry.

==== Working with A.R.G.U.S. ====
The season six premiere reveals that Diggle survived the explosion by taking shelter in a plane like the others. However, he was wounded by bomb shrapnel and suffers a degenerative nerve injury that affects his motor control that requires taking daily medications, resulting him to develop a drug dependency. When Oliver decides to retire from being the Green Arrow, he appoints Diggle as his successor, oblivious to the fact that Diggle is not in condition to remain in action. Oliver returns to vigilantism until Diggle is fully recovered from his injury. Curtis Holt develops an implant for Diggle to help him control his tremors as he progressively recovers. After Oliver decides to remain being the Green Arrow, Diggle accepts the job offer from Lyla as one of the commanding officers in A.R.G.U.S., using his new position to lead his subordinates to maintain order in the city's police's place due to them having been compromised by crime lord Ricardo Diaz. Near the end of the season, Diggle is fully healed and no longer needing Holt's implant. His A.R.G.U.S. team later joins forces with FBI agent Samanda Watson's subordinates, and working with Team Arrow, they ultimately take back the city from Diaz, who goes into hiding. After the Earth-X invasion he marries Oliver and Felicity, and Barry and Iris.

In season four of The Flash, Clifford DeVoe infiltrates the A.R.G.U.S. facility holding the metahuman Neil Borman by impersonating Diggle and kills most of the security; overcharging and killing Borman to be a nuclear battery for his satellites. Afterwards, Barry brings the real Diggle to S.T.A.R. Labs to reveal the location of the facility.

In season seven, Diggle remains working at A.R.G.U.S., and continues leading his manhunt against Diaz. The combined efforts of Diggle, A.R.G.U.S. and the other members of Team Arrow (except Oliver, who is in prison) result in the successful capture of Diaz. After Oliver is released from Slabside Maximum Security Prison in exchange for Diaz, Diggle and Felicity are the first to receive him. Later, Diaz is recruited by Diggle as a member of the "Ghost Initiative", his own version of the Suicide Squad. Diggle plans to use Diaz to locate Dante, the financier behind the legendary Longbow Hunters. Diggle returns to vigilantism along with Curtis and Rene Ramirez to capture the criminal Chimera. Despite succeeding, the trio are arrested for violating the city's anti-vigilante law, but mayor Emily Pollard ultimately offers to drop the charges against them, provided they agree to be deputized and work for the police, as Oliver has. The Ghost Initiative is successful in locating Dante, but when Diaz betrays the team and helps Dante escape, Diggle hands in his resignation to A.R.G.U.S. to save his wife's job, while sending Diaz back to Slabside. Diggle later meets his late father's commanding officer Roy Stewart; Diggle's father died during an operation abroad and he blames Stewart for leaving his father behind. Stewart went on to become Diggle's stepfather and put both Diggle and Andy through rigorous training to turn them into real soldiers, resulting in a strained relationship between Diggle and Stewart. The two make amends when Diggle learns that his father died because of his own negligence and Stewart is the reason anyone survived the operation. After Team Arrow thwarts the Ninth Circle's plan to destroy Star City, Diggle takes Oliver and a pregnant Felicity to an A.R.G.U.S. safe house in the woods where the two can raise their child safe from the Circle. The season also features flashforwards that take place in 2040. These feature Diggle's adoptive son Connor Hawke and reveal that J.J. is the leader of the Deathstroke gang. Connor states that J.J. grew up hating their parents and the expectations they put on them and considers the gang his way to rebel.

==== Stopping the Crisis ====
In season eight, Diggle meets six-year-old Connor for the first time, but does not yet adopt him. After the adult Connor is accidentally teleported from 2040 to 2019 with Oliver's children, Diggle is shocked and devastated to learn that J.J. is psychopathic and becomes Grant Wilson's protégé and successor as Deathstroke and kills Rene's daughter Zoe in the future. Though these revelations strain their friendship, Diggle and Rene are determined to change their respective children's fates. Despite Diggle learning that his future bond with his adoptive son is what possibly would cause J.J. to take the path of evil, Diggle chooses to accept his destiny to Connor while trying to save J.J. After the events of the Crisis, during which Oliver perished, Diggle's daughter Sara is restored to existence, and he and Lyla are happy of having two children. While moving to Metropolis, Diggle is intrigued by a crashed spaceship and discovers a mysterious box that glows green. In season six of The Flash, Diggle arrives in Central City to give Barry the mask he gave Oliver the first time they met. Diggle also helps him come to terms with Oliver's death.

==== Helping other heroes ====
When on an A.R.G.U.S. assignment in Gotham City, Diggle encounters Luke Fox in a bar where he got involved in a poker game with Russell Tavaroff. When Tavaroff attacks Luke outside the bar, Diggle stops him. While comparing to how they both lost their fathers, Diggle advises Luke to take the right path as they notice the Bat-Signal giving off a Morse code. This conversation inspires Luke to become Batwing.

After almost a year, Diggle arrives in Central City to help Barry trap a Godspeed drone with an Entropy Trap. Diggle convinces Barry to go to 2049 to check on his daughter Nora, but he is knocked out of the Speed Force by Godspeed drones. Diggle, Cecile Horton, and Frost find an amnesiac August Heart, but soon make him remember his identity. Following this, Diggle vows to resolve something he has "been putting off": figuring out how to open the box.

Sometime later, James Olsen contacts Diggle to help his sister, Kelly Olsen, after Nyxlygsptlnz imploded the Ormfell Building, causing those caught in the implosion to be exposed to 5th Dimensional energies. When it is discovered that Councilwoman Jean Rankin took an experimental medicine that enabled her to use those energies at the cost of draining the victims of their energy, Diggle gives Kelly some inspirational advice when operating as the new Guardian and even mentions some wise words that he learned from Jefferson Pierce. This episode talks about racial trauma and the importance of not only listening when people ask for help, but also finding a way to support and aid them so they are not alone in their fight for safety and justice. "I know, but do you hear me? Do you see what is happening? People are gonna die. And I feel like I am yelling into a void! We're supposed to fight for everyone, together. And yet, I am looking at people suffer, people that look like me and everyone here is just too busy. Where is the outrage that people are gonna die without help? Without hope? Maybe you could spare a second for them."

After a while, Diggle assists his old friend Jada Jet into finding Joker's joy buzzer that would be used to help treat Marquis. They find it in Renee Montoya's office. Diggle later finds Luke at the grave of Lucius Fox where he asks him to help open a box in his possession.

==== Declining the Box ====
After some time, Diggle visits Eobard Thawne, who is imprisoned in an A.R.G.U.S. supermax prison on Lian Yu. After Barry departed after asking Thawne about a Fast Track Labs worker claiming to be Eobard Thawne, Diggle appears to ask for his help on unlocking the mystery box (confirmed to contain a Green Lantern Power Ring) he had found. Thawne helps him to reopen it, but Diggle declines its powers since he prefers to be with his family.

==== Assisting in fighting Bloodwork ====
While attending Barry Allen's birthday party, John Diggle is among those who got taken over by Bloodwork's blood samples. Khione later used her powers to free Diggle so that he can help Flash and a temporarily resurrected Green Arrow. As Spartan, he helps Green Arrow, Flash, and Kid Flash in defeating Bloodwork before he can infect the Multiverse with his blood.

=== Superman & Lois version ===
A doppelganger of John Diggle appears in the Earth that Superman & Lois takes place on.

==== Delivering A.R.G.U.S. equipment ====
When called for help by General Sam Lane, John Diggle arrives in Smallville with some A.R.G.U.S. equipment. After a talk with Lois, Diggle scolds Sam for plotting to use the A.R.G.U.S. technology to take out Superman due to Tal-Rho planning to subject him to the Eradicator. When he finds out that John Henry Irons is from another Earth, Diggle states to Sam that they will have a talk about this later. Later on, Diggle mentions to Sam that he left the life of dealing with the deaths of people he knew and encountering people from other Earths, and implores him to try and stop Superman without killing him, reasoning that their Earth's version of Oliver Queen would have done the same.

==== Working with John Henry Irons ====
A few months later, Diggle visits John Henry Irons at a diner after the defeat of Ally Allston, wanting to know why Bruno Mannheim killed this Earth's Irons.

== In other media ==
=== Print media ===
John Diggle, in his DC Comics publications' canon debut on Green Arrow #24 (Dec. 2013 DC Comics). Art by Andrea Sorrentino.

The character appeared in Arrow 2.5, a bi-weekly digital comic series that bridged the gap between the end of season two and the start of season three. He also features in the tie-in novels published for the series, Arrow: Vengeance, written by Oscar Balderrama and Lauren Certo, The Flash: The Haunting of Barry Allen written by Susan and Clay Griffith, and its sequel Arrow: A Generation of Vipers from the same authors, as well as Arrow Fatal Legacies, co-authored by Marc Guggenheim and James R. Tuck, published in January 2018. This novel bridged the gap between the season five finale and the season six premiere of Arrow.

While Diggle was originally created for Arrow, a character of the same name was introduced into the Green Arrow comics during The New 52 run, in 2013, but having little resemblance to Ramsey's likeness. Looking at any elements of the show which would transfer to the comic-run, writer Jeff Lemire described the character of Diggle as "the breakout of that show", and wanted to incorporate elements of that into his story. When DC rebooted its continuity with DC Rebirth in 2016, Diggle continued to feature in the Green Arrow comics with more or less the same backstory as the show with minor alterations such as him being from Seattle.

=== Video games ===
The character appears in the Lego Batman 3: Beyond Gotham video game as part of the Arrow DLC pack. As well as featuring in the add-on pack's level, Diggle can also be used in any other level as a freeplay character.

== Reception ==
Writing for the DC Comics website, Ashley V. Robinson named Diggle as one of her "all-time favorite characters". Jesse Schedeen of IGN praised Ramsey's performance in the episode "Brothers in Arms", calling it "easily Ramsey's strongest episode in a long time".
