= Pilot (Arrow) =

- Arrow episode
- Promotional poster
- Episode no.: Season 1 Episode 1
- Directed by: David Nutter
- Story by: Greg Berlanti; Marc Guggenheim
- Teleplay by: Andrew Kreisberg; Marc Guggenheim
- Cinematography by: Glen Winter
- Editing by: Paul Karasick
- Production code: 296818
- Original air date: October 10, 2012
- Running time: 43 minutes

Guest appearances
- Colin Salmon as Walter Steele; Jamey Sheridan as Robert Queen; Jacqueline MacInnes Wood as Sara Lance; Annie Ilonzeh as Joanna De La Vega; Kathleen Gati as Raisa; Roger Cross as Lucas Hilton; Brian Markinson as Adam Hunt; Ben Cotton as Dave Hackett

Episode chronology
← Previous —	Next → "Honor Thy Father"
- Arrow season 1

"Pilot" is the first episode of the television series Arrow, which premiered on The CW on October 10, 2012. It was written by series developers Greg Berlanti, Marc Guggenheim and Andrew Kreisberg, and directed by executive producer David Nutter. The episode introduces Oliver Queen (Stephen Amell), a billionaire playboy, his mother Moira Queen (Susanna Thompson), sister Thea (Willa Holland), new bodyguard John Diggle (David Ramsey), best friend Tommy Merlyn (Colin Donnell), ex-girlfriend Laurel Lance (Katie Cassidy), and her father Detective Quentin Lance (Paul Blackthorne). It follows Oliver as he returns to Starling City, after having been shipwrecked for five years, and becomes a bow-wielding, hooded vigilante who sets out to right the wrongs of his father, who died during the shipwreck, and save the city.

Filmed in Vancouver, Canada, the pilot features two timelines on display: Oliver in the present, fighting crime as a vigilante, and Oliver when he is shipwrecked five years earlier. The developers wanted to bring a realistic vision to the character, which translated into a functional costume and no superpowers being featured. The pilot became the highest rated show on The CW in three years. It received generally favorable reviews from critics, who generally cited Amell's performance as a highlight. The episode was nominated for various awards, winning three.

== Plot ==
Billionaire playboy Oliver Queen is rescued from a remote Mandarin Pacific island of Lian Yu after being shipwrecked for five years. Oliver is welcomed home to Starling City by his mother Moira, new stepfather Walter Steele, younger sister Thea, and best friend Tommy Merlyn, though he refuses to talk about his time on the island or the scars riddling his body.

Oliver and Tommy visit Laurel Lance, now a lawyer suing corrupt businessman Adam Hunt. Oliver tries to apologize, but Laurel rebuffs him as she blames him for her sister's death. As they leave, Tommy and Oliver are kidnapped and questioned about Oliver's dad Robert. Oliver breaks free and kills the kidnappers; he later tells Detective Quentin Lance that they were saved by a man in a green hood. Moira hires John Diggle as Oliver's bodyguard.

Shaking off Diggle, Oliver begins building his base of operations at an abandoned Queen Industrial warehouse. He reviews a list of names on which Hunt is present. Disguised in a green hood and armed with a bow and arrows, Oliver threatens Hunt for $40 million to pay back the residents of the Glades, who had lost their homes and savings as a result of his company.

At Oliver's homecoming party, Laurel tries to make amends with Oliver, but he claims he hasn't changed and will only hurt her. As the vigilante, he confronts Hunt again and transfers the money himself. Moira secretly meets with a man who assures her that the police will not discover her connection to the kidnapping.

In flashbacks, Oliver is cheating on Laurel with Sara on the Queen's Gambit when the storm hits. On a lifeboat, Robert apologizes to Oliver and asks him to correct his mistakes and save the city, before shooting a surviving crew member and himself to ensure Oliver's survival.

== Production ==
=== Conception ===
On January 12, 2012, The CW began preparing a new series centered around the character Green Arrow, developed by Andrew Kreisberg, Greg Berlanti and Marc Guggenheim. A week later, the network ordered a pilot, now titled Arrow, and brought in David Nutter to direct. When developing the series, producer Marc Guggenheim expressed that the creative team wanted to "chart [their] own course, [their] own destiny", and avoid any direct connections to Smallville, which featured its own Green Arrow/Oliver Queen (Justin Hartley). They opted to cast a new actor in the role of Oliver Queen. Unlike with Smallville, the pilot does not initially feature super-powered heroes and villains. Instead, the creative still took inspiration from Smallville, as one of the main themes was to "look at the humanity" of Oliver Queen, as Smallville had done with Clark Kent. The decision not to include superpowers was, in part, based on the executives' desire to take a realistic look at the characters in this universe.

=== Casting ===
Amy Brenneman made a point of really befriending me before we started shooting [Private Practice] [...] I was really taken with how she connected with me, person to person, before we tried to connect, actor to actor. So, I made a real point to do that [with the Arrow cast] [...] I think that you can see that [we hit it off] [...] If you have to put your hand on somebody's shoulder, if you've done it before, it makes it easier to do. Sometimes it's imperceptible, but I think it's what takes things from good to great, or from 2D to 3D.

— Amell interview with Collider

Stephen Amell was one of the first actors to audition for the role of Oliver Queen, and Kreisberg felt that he "hit the target from the outset" and "everyone else just paled in comparison". Arrow's pilot script was the first Amell auditioned for during pilot season, having received multiple scripts at the start of the year. Producer Marc Guggenheim expressed that the creative team wanted to "chart [their] own course, [their] own destiny", and avoid any direct connections to Smallville, which featured its own Green Arrow/Oliver Queen who was portrayed by Justin Hartley. Instead, they opted to cast a new actor in the titular role. Amell, who was already in shape from Rent-a-Goalie, did physical fitness training at Tempest Freerunning Academy out of Reseda, California. He received archery training as well, which included watching a video on how archery has been displayed inaccurately or poorly in television and film before learning the basics of shooting a bow. For Amell, the appeal of portraying Queen was that he saw multiple roles tied to the same character: "There's Queen the casual playboy; Queen the wounded hero; Queen the brooding Hamlet; Queen the lover; Queen the man of action, and so on."

Katie Cassidy was cast as Dinah Laurel Lance on February 15, 2012; Laurel is also the vigilante Black Canary in the comic books. Cassidy said she was drawn to the show by Berlanti, Nutter, Kreisberg, and Guggenheim, whom she called smart, creative, and edgy. It was announced in February 2012 that Colin Donnell was cast as Tommy Merlyn—a character whose surname is based on Green Arrow's nemesis in the comics—and David Ramsey would portray John Diggle, Oliver's bodyguard and a character not previously established through the comic books. Ramsey enjoyed the fact that he did not have to worry about matching the comic books. It allowed him to "just kind of take [his character], and run with it". Jacqueline MacInnes Wood was cast as Sara Lance, Laurel's sister, for the pilot. However, when the character returned in the second season, Wood was replaced by Caity Lotz.

=== Filming ===
Production on the pilot began in March 2012 in Vancouver, Canada. The series features two distinct timelines, which requires more specific planning in the filming schedule. Filming for the island flashbacks takes place in Vancouver's Whytecliff Park area, near beachfront homes. The production team is tasked with keeping the buildings out of camera frame. Additionally, producer Marc Guggenheim finds the process arduous: "Stephen [Amell] has to wear a wig, and his look has to be changed... there's a lot. It's actually incredibly ambitious to do these flashbacks every week, every single episode. Because like Andrew [Kreisberg] said, it's almost like it's its own show." Hatley Castle, located in Royal Roads University was used for exterior shots for the Queen family mansion. Hatley Castle had previously been used as the Luthor ancestral home in Smallville. Vancouver's Terminal City Ironworks Complex doubles as the exterior for Queen Consolidated, Inc.

=== Design ===
When it came time to design the look of the costume for Oliver Queen's vigilante persona, the studio brought in Colleen Atwood to develop a realistic approach to the suit. According to Amell, it was important for the suit to be functional, and the best way that he knew for that was if he could put the costume on by himself: "If I can put it on by myself, I think that people will buy it. And that was our idea. That's our world." The opening scene on Lian Yu features an easter egg of a Deathstroke mask with an arrow through it. David Nutter wanted a foreground element and Geoff Johns, who was visiting the set, suggested using the mask. This easter egg eventually led to the introduction of Billy Wintergreen in episode five and Slade Wilson in episode thirteen.

== Reception ==
=== Ratings ===
Arrow's premiere episode drew 4.14 million viewers, making it The CW's most-watched telecast of any show on any night in three years, and The CW's most-watched series premiere since The Vampire Diaries in 2009. In Australia, the premiere received 1.32 million viewers, making it the third most-watched broadcast on the network that night. The UK broadcast was the fourth highest-rated telecast of the week, with 1.85 million viewers. In Canada, the first episode got 1.32 million viewers, making it the fourth most-watched airing of the night and the twenty-third of the week.

=== Critical response ===
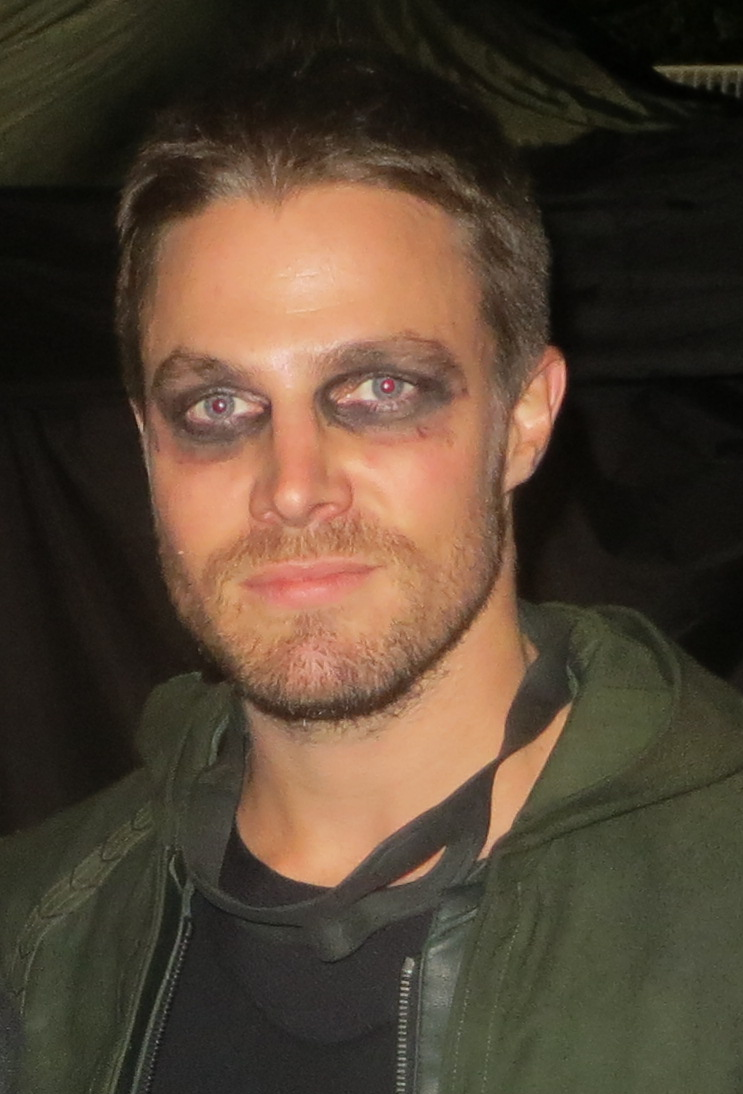
Amell (on set) was praised by multiple critics for his ability to portray the various sides of Oliver Queen convincingly.

The pilot episode received generally favorable reviews upon release. Newsday's Verne Gay commended the series' start, specifically the casting of Susanna Thompson as Moira Queen and the pilot's ability to weave in the action with "a pleasing romantic triangle, interfamily intrigue, a flawed hero and [...] a mystery." David Hiltbrand, of The Philadelphia Inquirer, characterizes the pilot as a "dark, gleaming gem", but acknowledges that the show's success will be built around how well it maintains the quality of the action sequences and the mystery behind Oliver's motives. NY Daily News' David Hinckley praised the start of the series as being "lively" and "better than hard-core 'Green Arrow' fans expected"; Hinckley also pointed out that Amell does a good job of finding the proper balance for Oliver as he moves between his "old world" and "new world". San Francisco Chronicle's David Wiegand favorably compared the pilot to Smallville, stating that the series is fun and action-packed, and worth the same level of longevity that Smallville received. Weigand praised Amell's performance and his ability to convincingly portray both the spoiled billionaire and his vigilante alter-ego, and gives credit to director David Nutter and the editors for putting together an episode that built suspense and kept the action fast and believable.

Robert Bianco, of USA Today, characterized the pilot as a Dark Knight version of the Green Arrow character. Bianco praised the action sequences, the emotional development with the characters, and the mystery of the plot. He contends that the biggest hurdle to Arrow's success will be the network in which it airs. Variety's Brian Lowry also said the pilot felt more like a lite version of Christopher Nolan's Dark Knight saga, but believed the action could not hide the two-dimensional characters that were introduced. Lowry further commented that the series would have an "uphill climb" when it comes to mainstream appeal because of the "second-tier" nature of its primary comic book character. The Hollywood Reporter's Tim Goodman stated, if you can get past the implausibility, Arrow is entertaining and matches the type of brand The CW is creating. Sarah Rodman, of The Boston Globe, also said the pilot was cartoonish, specifically commenting on Amell's "stilted narration" and the storyline feeling "silly". She further stated that pilot would please fans of the genre, and drama fans who can suspend their disbelief that an alcoholic billionaire "driven mad on a remote island for five years would now know how to hack computers".

=== Accolades ===
The pilot won multiple Leo Awards, including Best Cinematography in a Dramatic Series (Glen Winter), Best Production Design in a Dramatic Series (Richard Hudolin), and Best Stunt Coordination in a Dramatic Series (J.J. Makaro). Glen Winter was also nominated for an award based on his work in the pilot episode by the Canadian Society of Cinematographers.
