= Laurel Lance (Arrowverse) =

Fictional character in the Arrowverse franchise

- Arrowverse character
- Katie Cassidy as Earth-1 Laurel Lance / Black Canary in Arrow season 3
- First appearance: "Pilot", "Invincible"; Arrow / The Flash; October 10, 2012 (Earth-1 version) May 17, 2016 (Earth-2 version)
- Last appearance: "Crisis on Infinite Earths", "Fadeout"; Arrow; January 14, 2020 (Earth-1 version) January 28, 2020 (Earth-2 version)
- Based on: Black Canary by: Robert Kanigher; Carmine Infantino
- Adapted by: Greg Berlanti; Andrew Kreisberg; Marc Guggenheim; Gabrielle Stanton; Aaron Helbing; Todd Helbing
- Portrayed by: Katie Cassidy

In-universe information
- Full name: Dinah Laurel Lance
- Aliases: Black Canary; Black Siren (Earth-2 version; formerly); Siu Jerk Jai (Earth-2 version, occasionally)
- Family: Quentin Lance (father); Dinah Lance (mother); Sara Lance (younger sister)

Dinah Laurel Lance is a fictional character in The CW's Arrowverse franchise based on the DC Comics character of the same name, created by writer-artist team of Robert Kanigher and Carmine Infantino, and adapted by Greg Berlanti, Marc Guggenheim and Andrew Kreisberg for Arrow in 2012. Katie Cassidy portrays the several multiverse versions of the character within the Arrowverse, all of whom are mostly referred to by their middle name, "Laurel", unlike the comics.

The first version of Laurel is introduced in the pilot episode of Arrow as a legal aid attorney and Oliver Queen's ex-girlfriend, who later becomes a vigilante and takes up the mantle of Black Canary in subsequent seasons of Arrow until her death in season four. The character also appears in spin-off shows The Flash and Legends of Tomorrow as well web series Vixen, which are all set in the same shared fictional universe.

In 2016, the penultimate episode of The Flash season two introduces an antagonist doppelgänger of Laurel Lance from the parallel universe Earth-2, who is known as Black Siren. The character subsequently recurs in Arrow season five and becomes one of the main characters from season six onward. This version of Laurel is gradually redeemed in the following seasons of Arrow and eventually assumes the heroic 'Black Canary' moniker, like her late Earth-1 counterpart.

Following the events of the sixth annual Arrowverse crossover "Crisis on Infinite Earths", Earth-2 Laurel is revived in the rebooted universe called Earth-Prime. The penultimate episode of Arrow's final season served as a pilot for a potential spin-off series Green Arrow and the Canaries set in 2040 in the new timeline, co-starring Cassidy as the character. However, the series was not picked up.

== Storylines ==
=== Laurel Lance (Earth-1) ===
Dinah Laurel Lance is first introduced in the pilot episode of Arrow as a legal-aid attorney working for a legal assistance group called CNRI (City Necessary Resources Initiative) in Starling City. Her father Quentin Lance is a detective and her younger sister Sara Lance and ex-boyfriend Oliver Queen are both presumed dead, while having a secret fling during the sinking of Queen's Gambit five years ago. Over season one's course, Laurel pursues a relationship with Tommy Merlyn, and often works with "The Hood", unaware that the vigilante is actually Oliver who has returned. Laurel initially blames Oliver for Sara's death but after her breakup with Tommy, she briefly resumes her relationship with Oliver. Tommy's death during the events of 'The Undertaking' eventually causes Oliver and Laurel to part ways.

In season two of Arrow, Laurel becomes an Assistant District Attorney, but also struggles with Tommy's death, leading her to fight her own battles with alcoholism and use of prescription drugs. She learns that her sister Sara is alive. She also learns that Oliver is the vigilante known as "The Arrow", and her sister is also a vigilante, whom she eventually names "The Canary". In the next season, Laurel witnesses Sara's murder and resolves to become a vigilante to find her sister's killer and to help people as Sara did. This leads her to begin combat training with Ted Grant, and later Nyssa al Ghul. Initially impersonating "The Canary", Laurel eventually assumes her own mantle as the "Black Canary" and joins Oliver's crusade. As Black Canary, she uses a side-handle baton as her trademark weapon, and later uses an updated version of her sister's sonic "Canary Cry" device designed by Cisco Ramon.

In season four of Arrow, Laurel is shown to be actively operating as the Black Canary, alongside John Diggle and Thea Queen, as a member of "Team Arrow". Laurel and Thea convince Oliver, who had retired with Felicity Smoak in the previous season, to return to the city (now renamed Star City) and join the team again, which leads to Oliver adopting the moniker "Green Arrow". Soon Laurel learns about the Lazarus Pit's power and attempts Sara's resurrection, which succeeds with John Constantine's help. Laurel soon convinces Sara to join Rip Hunter's team later known as the Legends; Sara does so, adopting the moniker "White Canary". Laurel subsequently works with Team Arrow as Black Canary for several missions. During one of their missions, she is mortally wounded by H.I.V.E. leader Damien Darhk and later dies in the hospital surrounded by the team and confessing to Oliver that she still loves him. At her funeral, Oliver reveals Black Canary's real identity to the public to stop Evelyn Sharp's impersonation from inadvertently labeling the Black Canary as a criminal. Laurel's death is avenged when Oliver kills Darhk.

In later seasons of Arrow, the Black Canary mantle is passed on to Dinah Drake by Oliver, while Laurel's Earth-2 doppelgänger, who is initially evil and goes by the moniker "Black Siren", eventually assumes Laurel's civilian identity on Earth-1 and gradually redeems herself to take on the "Black Canary" mantle too. In season six, Earth-1 Laurel is seen in Oliver's hallucination when he is drugged with Vertigo, accusing him of her death. In season seven, archive footage of Laurel as Black Canary is seen in Emerald Archer, a documentary about Oliver's vigilante activities. In season eight, Earth-1 Laurel appears as a speed force illusion in Arrow's episode of Crisis on Infinite Earths, where she mourns Sara's death alongside Diggle. After the events of Crisis, in the new Earth-Prime, Laurel is said to have married Tommy Merlyn, who survived the events of the first season in this new universe, although Laurel herself still later died.

=== Laurel Lance (Earth-2) ===
Cassidy as Earth-2 Laurel Lance, during her first appearance as Black Siren on The Flash.

Black Siren is introduced in The Flash season two's twenty-second episode "Invincible" as a criminal and member of Zoom's metahuman army. Her scream is a metahuman power that she uses to take down buildings on Zoom's order, but is stopped by Barry Allen / The Flash's team and imprisoned at S.T.A.R. Labs. Black Siren later re-appears in season five of Arrow. Initially posing as Earth-1 Laurel, she is revealed to be working for Prometheus. But her true identity is soon discovered by Felicity, and she, along with Team Arrow, imprison E2 Laurel at A.R.G.U.S. She later assists Prometheus again in kidnapping and taking the Team on Lian Yu. In the next season of Arrow, Black Siren works with criminals Cayden James and Ricardo Diaz, and becomes a recurring menace for Team Arrow. On James's order, she kills Dinah Drake's (the 3rd Black Canary's) partner and ex-lover Vincent Sobel, leaving Dinah angry and vengeful. Morally conflicted Earth-2 Laurel is persuaded and supported by her late Earth-1 counterpart's father Quentin Lance who remains optimistic about her redemption. She eventually goes public with a cover story of being abducted for "two years" making people believe that she is Earth-1 Laurel. In the season finale, Laurel is devastated when Quentin is shot and killed by Diaz while trying to save her.

In season seven of Arrow, Laurel takes on her Earth-1 counterpart's position as District Attorney and becomes an ally of Team Arrow. She gains Felicity's trust and the duo start a crusade to kill Diaz, but both eventually overcome their vengeance. Laurel later learns from Ben Turner that Diaz was murdered in prison by Oliver's half-sister Emiko Queen, who tries to discredit Laurel by exposing her criminal past. She briefly relapses into her Black Siren persona but Felicity, Dinah and Sara manage to stop and convince her. Laurel then goes back to Earth-2 in pursuit of full redemption and takes Earth-1 Laurel's Black Canary costume with her, given to her by Felicity. She later returns briefly to help the team battle Emiko and the Ninth Circle, now operating as the "Black Canary" of Earth-2. A brief flashforward set in 2040 shows a much-older Laurel working with a female vigilante group known as the "Canary Network", while helping a resistance movement against Galaxy One.

In the final season of Arrow, Laurel encounters Oliver on Earth-2, where she is shown to be actively working as Black Canary alongside Earth-2 Adrian Chase / The Hood. She is also reunited with John Diggle and the group works together to stop "The Undertaking", orchestrated by Tommy Merlyn / Dark Archer of this Earth. As Earth-2 is destroyed by antimatter, Laurel escapes with Oliver and Diggle to Earth-1 where she learns that Oliver is working for a cosmic being called The Monitor, to save the multiverse from a forthcoming crisis. Laurel assists Oliver and Team Arrow for subsequent missions, leading them to places like Hong Kong, Russia and Lian Yu, where they encountering several past and future enemies in time-altering settings designed by Novu, leading to "Crisis on Infinite Earths".

==== Rebooted universe, future timeline ====
Following the events of "Crisis on Infinite Earths", Laurel learns about Oliver's death and his role in rebooting the universe as the Spectre, resulting in a new universe in which several people including Quentin and Tommy, never died. She attends Oliver's funeral and learns from Tommy that her original Earth-1 counterpart had married him in this new universe but died later. At some point after the funeral, Laurel travels to the year 2040 in this new timeline to warn Oliver's daughter Mia Queen of an impending danger, and is reunited with Dinah Drake who is revealed to have been time-displaced since Oliver's funeral.

== Other versions ==
- In the Legends of Tomorrow season one episode "Star City 2046", the Legends accidentally travel to Star City in a dystopian future timeline, where Sara learns that Laurel had either abandoned Star City or died. However, this future timeline is not connected to the flash-forwards shown in Arrow season seven and eight. It is later revealed in the "Crisis on Infinite Earths" crossover that this future was on another earth in the multiverse, designated as Earth-16.
- A dream-state version of Laurel is seen in a simulated reality created by the Dominators in "Invasion!" (the 2016 crossover and also the 100th episode of Arrow). In this reality, Oliver and Laurel are engaged and the pair never became the Green Arrow or the Black Canary. Oliver and Sara bid farewell to Laurel before they escape from the reality.
- In an alternate re-written reality shown in the Legends of Tomorrow episode "Doomworld", the Black Canary (implied to be Earth-1 Laurel) was killed by Legion of Doom, along with many other heroes.
- The Earth-X doppelgänger of Laurel Lance, known as "Siren-X", appears in The Flash season four episode "Fury Rogue". Siren-X is a metahuman assassin with echolocation powers and an ultrasonic scream (similar to Earth-2 Laurel). She is the last surviving member of the New Reichsmen army, who were defeated and killed during the events of the "Crisis on Earth-X" crossover. To avenge their deaths, Siren-X attacks Leo Snart and follows him to Earth-1 but with Barry's help, she is defeated and taken back to Earth-X to be imprisoned. Her fate is unknown since "Crisis on Infinite Earths", where Earth-X is destroyed by the antimatter wave.

== Development ==
=== Creation and casting ===
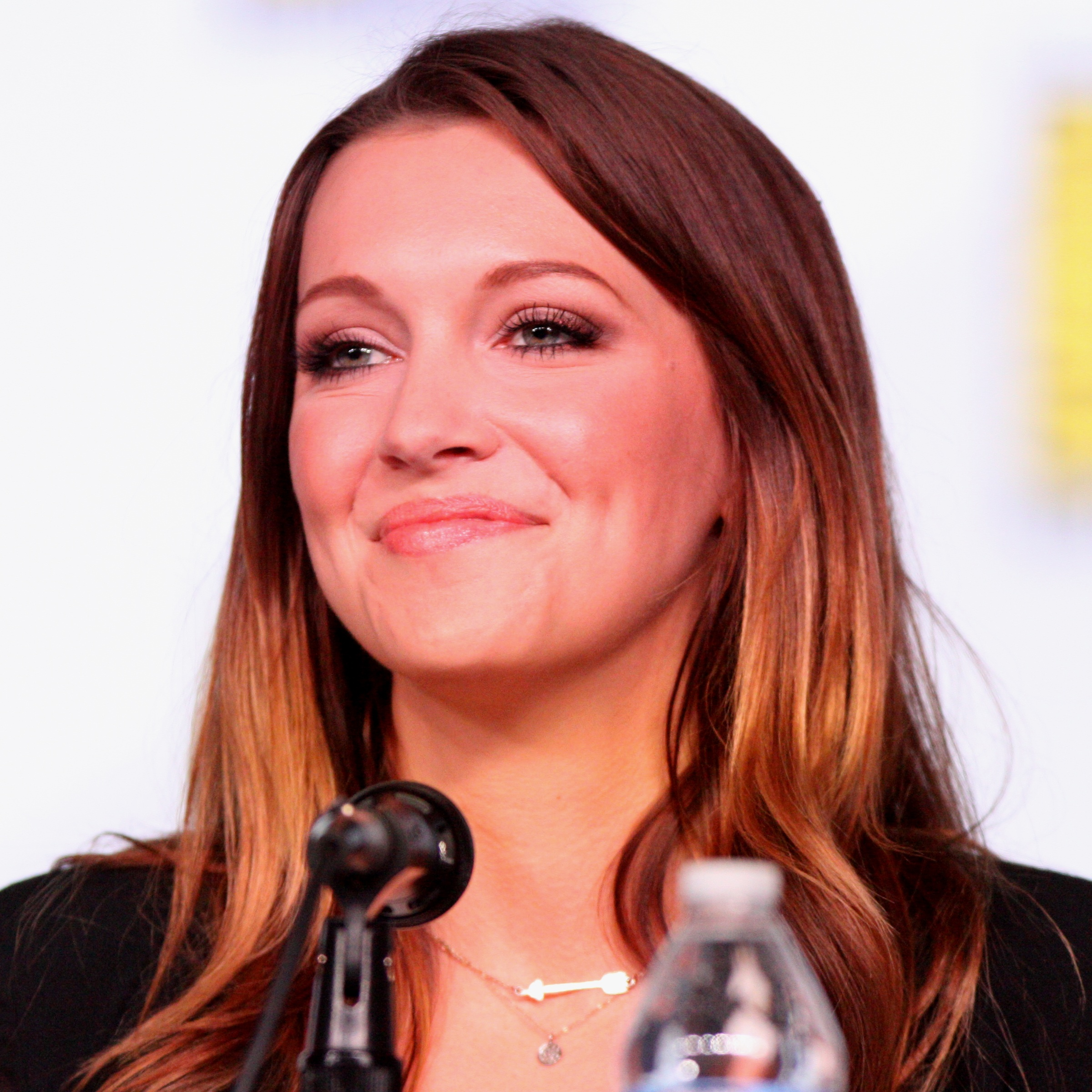
Katie Cassidy at the Arrow panel, at San Diego Comic Con in 2012.

In January 2012, after The CW ordered a television pilot for a potential Green Arrow series, its executive producers Andrew Kreisberg, Greg Berlanti and Marc Guggenheim developed the character of Dinah "Laurel" Lance, based on the Black Canary from DC Comics. The official character breakdown pitched Laurel as "a 28 years old, smart sexy, legal aid attorney determined to use her life as a one-woman war". In February 2012, actress Katie Cassidy, who previously worked in shows like Melrose Place and Gossip Girl for The CW, was cast for the role.

Regarding the differences between the characters on the show and in the comics, Warner Bros. Television president Peter Roth stated in an interview with TVLine, "We are working very closely with DC. We are making sure that each of the original characters are honored, are respected, and any changes that we make are being made with the sanction and endorsement of DC." In an interview given in October 2012, Cassidy stated that she loved the script when she read it. She went on to say that, "It was everything that I wanted to get involved with, so I was beyond thrilled."

"Laurel, in the corporate world and as a lawyer, is so good at what she does. She makes stuff happen, in the business world. At some point, if and when the Black Canary happens, it's just awesome for a woman to get to kick some ass and fight, and just be as tough and bad-ass as Green Arrow, or whoever. I think it's cool, and I think it's fun. I cannot wait to do some fight training. It's going to be awesome!

— Cassidy in 2012, on the possibility of Black Canary.

=== Characterization ===
In DC Comics, Dinah Laurel Lance is one version of Black Canary, a superhero in her own right, and a love interest and eventual wife of the Green Arrow. However, the series takes a different route and introduces the character as a legal attorney and childhood friend of Oliver Queen, with whom she shares a romantic past. The character is known by her middle name, Laurel. Oliver and Laurel's relationship is one of the key plots in season 1, as she initially blames him for cheating on her and causing her sister's death, but later forgives him and attempts to rekindle their relationship.

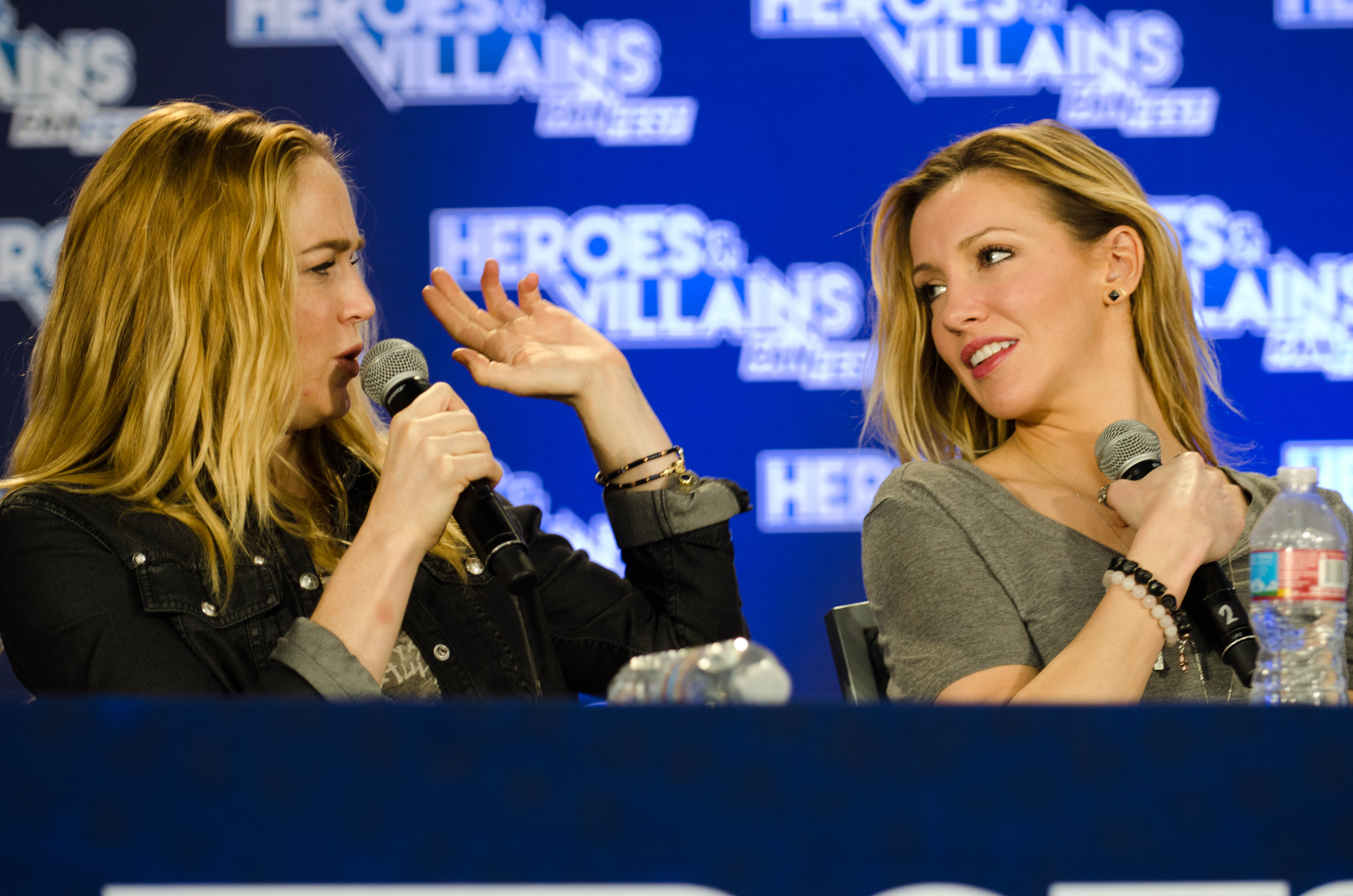
Caity Lotz and Katie Cassidy discussing their characters, at the Heroes and Villians Fan Fest in 2015.

Laurel's sister Sara Lance, an original character developed for the series, is re-introduced in season 2 as a female vigilante known as the 'Canary' (portrayed by Caity Lotz, who replaces Jacqueline MacInnes Wood from season 1). In an interview with TV Guide, then-executive producer Andrew Kreisberg revealed that Lotz's character was the beginning of the Black Canary's story. He further stated that, "Everyone knows that Laurel Lance is the Black Canary. But how we get from A to B is the story of our show – People will see how Caity Lotz fits into Laurel's journey along the way". Sara's 'Canary' arc serves as a backstory for Laurel's eventual path to becoming the 'Black Canary', which is also a legacy moniker in the comics, and usually shown to be passed on from mother to daughter in most iterations of the character. Before assuming the mantle, Laurel's character goes through various personal tragedies in the first two seasons, such as losing her boyfriend Tommy, being kidnapped multiple times, dealing with her father's alcohol-addiction, and then her own addiction and finally witnessing her sister's murder in the season 3 premiere. In an interview dated January 2015, Katie Cassidy stated that, "You can't just overnight all of a sudden be a superhero. You have to go through things and hit your rock bottom and then be able to come out on top and build character and be strong."

=== Character death, "Multiverse" and return ===
In April 2016, during Arrow's fourth season, the character was killed off in the episode "Eleven-Fifty-Nine". The-then showrunners and executive producers Marc Guggenheim and Wendy Mericle cited the decision to kill off Laurel as a "creative choice", at a press screening. They also stated that, "Death does not mean goodbye on any of these shows" hinting at a possible return for the character/actress. Cassidy mentioned in an interview that she learned about Laurel's fate only two episodes before shooting began on "Eleven-Fifty-Nine". However, she explained that, "I've had such an incredible arc, so it made sense to me, creatively, that we've told Laurel's story".

In May 2016, Cassidy appeared as Laurel Lance's Earth-2 doppelgänger known as Black Siren on The Flash, which had already introduced the concept of "Multiverse" in its then-ongoing second season. The alias "Black Siren" serves as a callback to the Justice Guild of America member from the Justice League animated series who herself was based on the Golden Age Black Canary. In July 2016, Cassidy was promoted to a series regular across all Arrowverse shows, as part of a special contract that allowed actors to recur on multiple shows simultaneously, previously signed by fellow actors Wentworth Miller and John Barrowman. In March 2017, it was announced that the actress would return to Arrow full-time for its sixth season and portray the Earth-2 Laurel. Towards the end of Arrow season seven, Earth-2 Laurel eventually finds redemption and takes up the mantle of Black Canary. Regarding the character's new costume in season eight, Cassidy stated in an interview, "It really truly feels like the Black Canary. It feels like Laurel Lance. It feels almost truer to the comic book than we've seen, and I think that's really cool. I wish I had it sooner".

=== Spin-off ===
In August 2019, Newsarama reported that Katie Cassidy had pitched a Birds of Prey spin-off to the network. When asked about her previous interest in the team, Cassidy said, "I've pitched it. I think they should. It's time for women". In September 2019, The Hollywood Reporter confirmed that The CW were developing a female-led spin-off series, with Katherine McNamara, Cassidy and Juliana Harkavy as the leads, reprising their roles from Arrow, titled Green Arrow and the Canaries. However, the series was ultimately not picked up by The CW.

== Reception ==
=== Critical reception ===
The character received mixed response from the critics during initial seasons of Arrow. David Hinckley of New York Daily News wrote, "Cassidy starts off well and is likely to get better as Laurel starts to figure things out", in his review of the pilot episode. Other critics wrote Laurel as "a scrappy legal aid attorney" or "plainly a good girl". Laurel's character was often compared to Rachel Dawes from Christopher Nolan's The Dark Knight Trilogy, with some critics calling Laurel as Arrow's version of Dawes. Jesse Schedeen of IGN included the character among "hit and miss" characters in his Arrow season one review. Shunal Doke of the same website criticized Cassidy's portrayal for making the character "unlikable" but appreciated the motivations behind the character and wrote her as "eventually proving worthy of becoming a costumed heroine."

The critical response towards the character improved in subsequent seasons. In IGN's review of season three finale, Schedeen praised Laurel's team-up with Nyssa and wrote, "It seems Laurel has finally graduated to the big leagues, and she didn't even need to rely on her Canary Cry." Writing for Entertainment Weekly, Chancellor Agard observed in his review of season three, that "Laurel, who was once the show's biggest problem, came into her own this season". In his review of season four episode "Eleven-Fifty-Nine", Schedeen called Laurel's death a "huge emotional moment" and her final conversation with Oliver as Cassidy's finest moments on the series. Writing for TV Overmind, Andy Behbakht criticized the decision to kill off Laurel, feeling the character was underutilized and "The Black Canary was in many ways one of Arrow's big hearts and seeing the show losing that character, makes the series lose a lot of its remaining magic". Eric Francisco of Inverse called the decision "a bold move that would have been a good one for the show... if it had been handled with delicate care. But Arrow is not delicate." Laurel's death also drew criticism from many fans, prompting an online backlash.

The Earth-2 version of the character – Black Siren received positive reviews. Angelica Jade Bastién of Vulture wrote in her review that, "The Flash better serves Laurel than Arrow did in several seasons – Black Siren has swagger". Schedeen also praised the character and wrote, "It was refreshing to see Cassidy cut loose and play a twisted version of her character". The Arrow season seven episode "Lost Canary" focuses primarily on Earth-2 Laurel's eventual redemption, which mainly garnered positive reviews. Scheeden wrote in his review, "We see Laurel at her best and truly embodying the redemption being Black Canary offers." Season 8 episode "Welcome to Hong Kong" sees Laurel deal with the fallout of her home world's destruction. In his review, Schedeen wrote, "...this version of the character has never been more sympathetic or identifiable than when confronting the death of a world where she finally found happiness. Her ultimate decision to bounce back and continue saving the living in order to honor the dead feels like the culmination of a major arc for this character." Chancellor Agard of Entertainment Weekly said, "Overall, I loved Laurel in this episode more than anything else. The exploration of Laurel's grief over the loss of Earth-2 is some of the best material Cassidy has ever had on the show and yields one of her best performances."

=== Accolades ===
Year	Award	Category	Nominee	Result	Ref.
2013	Teen Choice Awards	Choice TV Actress: Fantasy/Sci-Fi	Katie Cassidy	Nominated	
2015	PRISM Awards	Performance in a Drama Multi-Episode Storyline	Katie Cassidy	Won	

== In other media ==
=== Print media ===
- The Earth-1 version of the character appears in the season one digital tie-in comic series Arrow, and also in Arrow: Season 2.5, a bi-weekly digital comic series that bridged the gap between seasons two and three.
- Both the Earth-1 and Earth-2 versions of Laurel are mentioned in the tie-in novel Arrow: Fatal Legacies, co-authored by Marc Guggenheim and James R. Tuck, which bridged the gap between the seasons five and six of Arrow.

=== Web media ===
==== Vixen ====
Cassidy provided the voice for the Earth-1 version of her character in the second season of the CW Seed Arrowverse animated web series Vixen. In the story, Laurel (Black Canary) provides assistance to Mari McCabe (Vixen), along with Ray Palmer (Atom), in capturing Mari's sister Kuasa in Star City. They later help Mari in combating former warlord Benatu Eshu in Detroit.

The Blu-ray and DVD re-release of the first two seasons was combined into a single story as Vixen: The Movie. It added fifteen minutes of never-before-seen content, including a few scenes of Earth-1 Laurel that were not included in the CW Seed release. The third season of Legends of Tomorrow ultimately changes the continuity of Vixen, resulting in an altered timeline where Mari McCabe now shares the 'Vixen' mantle with Kuasa. It is unclear to what capacity the events of Vixen season 2 get affected.

==== The Chronicles of Cisco ====
The Earth-1 version was mentioned in The Chronicles of Cisco Post 9 "Chapter Seven: Hannibal Bates", and a video footage of the Earth-2 Laurel is seen in Post 40. The Earth-X version was mentioned in Post 79 "#BestListenerEver".

== See also ==
- Black Canary in other media
- List of Arrow characters
- List of Arrowverse cast members
