= Sara Lance =

Fictional character from the Arrowverse

- Arrowverse character
- Caity Lotz as Sara Lance / White Canary in Legends of Tomorrow
- First appearance: "Pilot"; Arrow; October 10, 2012
- Last appearance: "Knocked Down, Knocked Up"; Legends of Tomorrow; March 2, 2022
- Created by: Greg Berlanti; Marc Guggenheim; Andrew Kreisberg
- Portrayed by: Caity Lotz (2013–2022); Jacqueline MacInnes Wood (Arrow pilot only)

In-universe information
- Aliases: The Canary; Ta'ir as-Safir (طائر الصافر); Black Canary; White Canary
- Affiliation: Legends; Team Arrow; Paragons; League of Assassins (previously); Justice League
- Family: Ava Sharpe (wife); Quentin Lance (father); Dinah Lance (mother); Laurel Lance (older sister; deceased)
- Significant others: Oliver Queen (deceased); Leonard Snart (deceased); Nyssa al Ghul

Sara Lance, also known by her alter ego White Canary, is a fictional character in The CW's Arrowverse franchise, first introduced in the 2012 pilot episode of the television series Arrow, and later starring in Legends of Tomorrow. The character is an original character to the television series, created by Greg Berlanti, Marc Guggenheim and Andrew Kreisberg, but incorporates character and plot elements of the DC Comics character Black Canary. Sara was portrayed by Jacqueline MacInnes Wood in the pilot episode, with Caity Lotz replacing Wood in subsequent appearances.

Sara initially goes by the moniker of The Canary, a translation of her Arabic League of Assassins name الطائر الصافر (Ta-er al-Sahfer). She later adopts the code name of White Canary before joining the Legends of Tomorrow, and eventually becoming the captain of the team.

Lotz has appeared as Sara Lance and her superhero persona in crossovers on The Flash, Supergirl and Batwoman, all set within the Arrowverse. The character has also appeared in a digital comic book series.

== Fictional character biography ==
=== Arrow ===
==== Pre-season 1 ====
Sara Lance first appears in the pilot episode of Arrow as the younger sister of Laurel Lance. Five years prior to the beginning of the series, she was having a secret affair with her sister's boyfriend Oliver Queen and was with him on his family yacht when it shipwrecked. Everyone on board was presumed dead but flashbacks in season two reveal that, like Oliver, Sara actually survived the experience. She was rescued by a research boat, the Amazo, and when Oliver was captured by the ship's crew, Sara helped him escape. Together, along with Oliver's friend Slade Wilson, they attacked the ship. Due to Slade's love for Shado, an ally who was killed indirectly because of Oliver who was being forced to choose who to live between Sara and Shado, Slade betrayed Oliver and took the ship and Oliver as his prisoner. Oliver and Sara confronted him on the freighter and Sara was swept away in the current, causing Oliver to believe that she died once again. However, Sara was found by Nyssa al Ghul, who took her to Nanda Parbat. She and Nyssa became lovers, and Sara became a deadly fighter with the League of Assassins under the name Ta-er al-Sahfer, roughly translated to "Yellow Bird" or "Canary" from Arabic.

==== Season 2 ====
In season two, Sara returns to Starling City after a six-year absence as "The Canary" to protect her family. In keeping with a promise, she also befriends wayward teenager Sin and watches over her. Oliver manages to capture and unmask the Canary, revealing Sara to be alive. She eventually informs her father, SCPD Detective Quentin Lance, and looks after him and Laurel (who also later discovers she's alive and is a vigilante). Sara joins Team Arrow and revisits a brief relationship with Oliver. She aids him and his colleagues Felicity Smoak, John Diggle, and Roy Harper in taking down a drug-enhanced Slade Wilson, with help from the League of Assassins, which requires Sara to return to Nanda Parbat.

==== Season 3 ====
In season three, Sara is killed on a rooftop with three arrows to the chest. Some time later, it is revealed that Thea Queen killed Sara after being drugged by her father Malcolm Merlyn as part of a plot to pit Oliver against Ra's al Ghul. Meanwhile, Laurel takes up Sara's mantle to fight crime as the Black Canary.

==== Season 4 ====
In season four, Laurel resurrects Sara using the League's mystical Lazarus Pit. The process is successful, but Sara loses her soul, making her feral and dangerous. Oliver calls his old friend John Constantine to assist them in restoring Sara's soul. Days later, Sara aids in rescuing Ray Palmer/The Atom from the hands of Damien Darhk, before leaving town to find herself, eventually joining the Legends along with Ray. During her time away with the Legends, Laurel is killed by Darhk and Sara is later made aware of it by Quentin when she briefly returns to present-day Star City at the end of season one of Legends of Tomorrow, where she and Quentin mourn Laurel together.

==== Season 6 ====
Sara briefly returns in season six when she receives a call from her sister's doppelgänger, the recently reformed criminal from Earth-2 Laurel Lance / Black Siren, who informs her that Quentin had been seriously injured in the battle against Ricardo Diaz and is in the hospital. Sara arrives and meets her deceased sister's doppelgänger, who had developed a genuine father-daughter relationship with Quentin; they refer to each other as such. Sara thanks Earth-2 Laurel for calling her; Laurel thanks her for coming. Laurel tells her that the doctors are optimistic that Quentin will make it and asks Sara if it is weird seeing her. Sara replies that it is, a little. Sara asks if she is like her Laurel, and Laurel replies that she hardly is at all, clearly disappointed with herself. The two witness Oliver being arrested for being the Green Arrow per the condition of his agreement with the FBI, in exchange for their help in the fight against Diaz and his allies. The doctor comes and informs everyone present that Quentin has died from lack of oxygen to his brain during surgery, leaving Sara, Laurel, Oliver, and the rest of Team Arrow devastated. Later, as Oliver (under the direction of the FBI) announces to the world on live TV that he is the Green Arrow, before being taken to prison, Sara and Laurel mourn together over Quentin's body.

==== Season 7 ====
In season seven, Sara returns when Felicity summons her to convince Black Siren to stop her crime spree after her crimes and being framed for murder. After they and Dinah stop Shadow Thief. Sara helps Black Siren come to terms with Quentin's death.

=== Legends of Tomorrow ===
==== Season 1 ====
In the spin-off series, Legends of Tomorrow, Sara is recruited by Rip Hunter to a time travelling team of rejects aimed at defeating the immortal villain Vandal Savage. Before she departs, Laurel gives Sara the White Canary name and outfit to signify her new start. Over the course of the first season, Sara continues her battle with bloodlust and sets in motion the events that will lead to her own rescue by Nyssa. While she romances or flirts with numerous people throughout history, among them a younger Martin Stein and a closeted lesbian 1950s nurse, she develops a budding relationship with teammate Leonard Snart, who bonds with her due to their common history as killers and desire to redeem themselves. Though Sara is slow to return his feelings, Snart eventually hints at his love for her and expresses a desire to have a future with her near the end of the season after they destroy the Occulus. Snart ends up sacrificing himself to destroy the Occulus in Ray Palmer's place, and Sara kisses him for the first and final time before leaving with the rest of the team before the Vanishing Point explodes. Sara subsequently mourns Snart's death and admits that he died a hero. The Legends return to 2016 a few months after they left, where Sara learns from her father that Laurel was killed by Damien Dhark. Sara confronts Rip about deliberately returning her to after Laurel's death to stop her from trying to save her, but Rip tells her that Laurel's death is a fixed point in time, and attempting to change it will only get herself and her father killed.

==== Season 2 ====
In season two, Sara becomes captain of the timeship Waverider and leader of the Legends following Rip's disappearance. She mercilessly hunts Darhk throughout history before accepting that she cannot bring Laurel back due to the delicacy of time. In the "Invasion!" crossover event, Sara and the Legends return to 2016 to aid Team Arrow, Team Flash, and Earth-38's Supergirl in repelling the Dominators' alien invasion. She subsequently learns of the subtle changes in the timeline due to Barry Allen travelling back in time to save his mother from Eobard Thawne out of grief for his father's death at the hands of Zoom, subsequently creating and undoing the Flashpoint timeline which has alerted the Dominators, and scolds Barry for his carelessness, while still using her own experience losing Laurel to sympathize with Barry. In the second-season finale, Sara is forced to use the Spear of Destiny to save reality from the Legion of Doom. While tempted to rewrite her own tragic history, the Spear briefly reunites Sara with a projection of Laurel, who encourages Sara to do what is right and make peace with her death. Sara then chooses to render the Spear itself inert, foiling the plans of Thawne himself (whose death as a result of Eddie Thawne's suicide had also been undone due to Barry creating and reverting Flashpoint) and allowing him to be killed by the Black Flash, who has been hunting him all season.

==== Season 3 ====
In season three of Legends, Sara continues to lead the Waverider crew as they track down and repair anachronisms throughout time, working in an antagonistic partnership with Rip Hunter's new bureaucratic organization, the Time Bureau. In the four-part crossover "Crisis on Earth-X", Sara travels to 2017 to attend the wedding of Barry Allen and Iris West, where she has a one-night stand with Supergirl's adoptive sister Alex Danvers. The assembled heroes work together to repel an invading Nazi army from the alternate world of Earth-X. While confronting the demonic entity Mallus alongside John Constantine, Sara and Constantine hook up, despite her ongoing romantic tension with Time Bureau agent Ava Sharpe. Ava and Sara begin dating in subsequent episodes, but break up after Sara is temporarily possessed by Mallus through the death totem and reasons that, given her history with death and destruction, she poses a danger to Ava. Despite this setback, they soon get back together, with the two shown to be in a stable relationship by the time of the Legends removing Paul Revere from the height of Beatlemania.

==== Season 4 ====
In season four of Legends focuses on Sara leading the team to track down magical "fugitives" of mythology from around the timestream, with the support of Ava and the Time Bureau.

==== Season 5 ====
In season five, after the Time Bureau is no more, Ava is co-captain of the Waverider and helps the team track down the "encores", evil criminals returned from hell to different points on the timeline.

==== Season 6 ====
In season six, Sara is abducted by aliens, later revealed to be employed by Bishop, a scientist from the 22nd century and Ava's creator, who wants Sara to work with him in an attempt to restart the human race with alien-human hybrids. After being fatally poisoned by an alien, Bishop clones Sara and transfers her dying mind into her new body that is spliced with alien DNA granting Sara regenerative abilities. Although horrified by what Bishop has done to her and no longer sure of who she is, Mick convinces her that she is still herself. After escaping the alien world with Mick and Gary, Sara returns to Earth and proposes to Ava who gladly accepts. The two eventually wed in 1925, during an alien invasion caused by Bishop which the Legends eventually manage to stop. However, before the Legends able to leave 1925, an unknown second Waverider destroyed the original Waverider.

==== Season 7 ====
During season seven, Sara is stranded in 1925 with the rest of the Legends. While trying to get back to 2021, they learn that the second Waverider was commanded by Bishop along with an evil version of Gideon, who later deploys robot versions of themselves to eliminate the Legends. Sara and the Legends try to get to Gwyn Davies in New York, the person who invented time travel, in order to help them get back home. At the end of season seven, it is revealed that Sara is pregnant with Ava's baby. When she returned to the Waverider, she was arrested by the Time Police alongside her team for breaking the timeline.

== Development ==
=== Development ===
According to Arrow executive producer Andrew Kreisberg, Sara was originally meant to be Ravager but they decided to give that role to Summer Glau's character Isabel Rochev instead. After the switch was made, Sara was made into the Canary.

After the character's death during Arrow's third season, it was announced in February 2015 that Caity Lotz would become a cast member on Legends of Tomorrow, though it was not until May that they revealed she would continue to play Sara instead of a new character.

Originally known for her martial arts prowess, in July 2019 it was announced that Sara would develop a superpower during the fifth season of Legends of Tomorrow, later revealed to be precognition.

=== Casting ===
Jacqueline MacInnes Wood was cast as Sara Lance in March 2012 and appeared in the pilot episode of Arrow. However, due to scheduling conflicts the role was recast. Caity Lotz was announced to be playing Arrow's version of Black Canary during July 2013. During the same month it was revealed that her character is Sara, who had survived the Queen's Gambit shipwreck.

== Reception ==
The revelation in the season two episode, "Heir to the Demon", that Sara is bisexual and has been in a relationship with Nyssa al Ghul was positively received by critics as it made her the first character from either Marvel or DC to be explicitly shown as bisexual in either the movies or TV shows. IGN's Jesse Schedeen praised the relationship between Sara and Wentworth Miller's character Leonard Snart (dubbed by fans as "Captain Canary"), as well as the chemistry between Lotz and Miller, describing the "faint romantic tension that existed between [them] since the first episode" as containing more weight than many of the other relationships on the show.

== In other media ==
- Sara Lance also features in the tie-in novel Arrow: Fatal Legacies which was released in January 2018. The novel focuses on events between the fifth-season finale and sixth-season premiere of Arrow and is co-authored by Arrow executive producer Marc Guggenheim and author James R. Tuck.
- White Canary appears as a playable character in the mobile-exclusive edition of Injustice 2, with her Legends of Tomorrow design appearing as an alternate skin for Black Canary.
