= Star City 2040 =

- Arrow episode
- Episode no.: Season 7 Episode 16
- Directed by: James Bamford
- Written by: Beth Schwartz; Oscar Balderrama
- Cinematography by: Neil Cervin
- Editing by: Thomas Wallerstein
- Original air date: March 18, 2019

Guest appearances
- Katherine McNamara as Mia Smoak; Ben Lewis as William Clayton; Joseph David-Jones as Connor Hawke; Andrea Sixtos as Zoe Ramirez; Katrina Law as Nyssa al Ghul; Raj Paul as Keven Dale

Episode chronology
← Previous "Training Day"	Next → "Inheritance"
- Arrow season 7

"Star City 2040" is the sixteenth episode of the seventh season of the American television series Arrow, based on the DC Comics character Green Arrow, revolving around billionaire playboy Oliver Queen as he returns to Starling City (later renamed Star City), after having been shipwrecked for five years, and becomes a bow-wielding, hooded vigilante who sets out to fight crime and corruption. It is set in the Arrowverse, sharing continuity with the other television series of the universe. The episode was written by showrunner Beth Schwartz and producer Oscar Balderrama and directed by supervising producer James Bamford.

Stephen Amell stars as Oliver, and is joined by principal cast members Emily Bett Rickards, Rick Gonzalez, Juliana Harkavy and Colton Haynes. The episode, set primarily in the future, sees Oliver's children Mia Smoak and William Clayton venture into the Glades on a dangerous mission. Katherine McNamara and Ben Lewis guest star as Mia and William.

"Star City 2040" first aired in the United States on The CW on March 18, 2019, and was watched by 1.60 million viewers with a 0.3/1 share among adults aged 18 to 49. The episode received generally positive reviews from critics.

== Plot ==
In 2019, Felicity Smoak gives birth to Oliver Queen's daughter Mia Smoak. During her growth in secrecy away from Star City in Bloomfield, Mia is trained by Nyssa al Ghul throughout her childhood and into adulthood, until the time the latter is defeated by Mia. After that, Mia is living alone with Felicity, and discovers a hidden room in their house, in which her mother is still secretly operating as a vigilante. Enraged that Felicity did not tell her this, Mia argues with her (recapping that she never left the house, never had a normal education because she never went to school, never went to live in a city), and then escapes to Star City, leaving a written note for Felicity. Once there, Mia becomes a cage fighter under the alias "Blackstar". Because she hates Felicity for still being a vigilante, she hates vigilantes, thinking that they ruined Star City instead of saving it.

In 2040, Oliver's son William Clayton and Mia follow Felicity's coordinates to Galaxy One headquarters, climbing the wall surrounding the Glades. They attempt to infiltrate the building and are almost caught, but are saved by Connor Hawke, who reveals himself as an agent of Knightwatch. He tells them that the only place where bombs might be hidden is in sublevels of the building accessed by an undisclosed elevator but, to get to the sublevels, they will need to get Galaxy One head Keven Dale's DNA, which they manage to do. Meanwhile, Dinah Drake, Roy Harper and Zoe Ramirez discover that the terrorist organization Eden Corps, thought to be extinct, uses Galaxy One as a front, and paid the Star City Police Department to fake Felicity's death. Rene Ramirez confronts the three, and reveals that Galaxy One plans to blow up Star City to rebuild it like the Glades, claiming that the city will be evacuated beforehand.

Mia, William and Connor enter the headquarters' sublevels, where they find an imprisoned Felicity, who claims that the building houses the bombs to be used in Star City, and that she would be the scapegoat of the bombings. The others reunite with the group, and Felicity reveals that she became the Calculator to infiltrate Galaxy One/Eden Corps and find out their plans, before they meet Rene, who has learned that the bombs are already on-site and that there are no plans to evacuate. The group infiltrates a masquerade party, where Mia manages to destroy an electronic device held by Dale, and thus, disables the bombs. During the party, Rene had pretended to hate vigilantes to isolate the masked Dale and, after the party, he continues the charade, announcing in a press conference that he is paying rewards for the persons who help capture the three "terrorists" Arsenal (Roy), Black Canary (Dinah), and Calculator (Felicity). Dale unveils a helmet to Rene that would enable Galaxy One to take the Archer program global. Felicity makes amends with Mia, stating that her grudge with Galaxy One is personal. In a flashback set in 2019, Felicity activates Archer.

== Production ==
=== Development ===
The seventh season of Arrow began employing a new storytelling technique, depicting the future Star City in sporadic flashforwards, in contrast to previous seasons which used flashbacks. In January 2019, showrunner Beth Schwartz announced that the sixteenth episode of the season would take place entirely in the future. The episode, titled "Star City 2040", was written by Beth Schwartz & Oscar Balderrama, and directed by James Bamford.

=== Casting ===
Principal cast members Stephen Amell, Emily Bett Rickards, Rick Gonzalez, Juliana Harkavy and Colton Haynes reprise their roles as Oliver Queen, Felicity Smoak, Rene Ramirez, Dinah Drake and Roy Harper. The guest cast for the season includes Katherine McNamara as Mia Smoak, Katrina Law as Nyssa al Ghul, Ben Lewis as William Clayton, Andrea Sixtos as Zoe Ramirez, Joseph David-Jones as Connor Hawke, and Raj Paul as Keven Dale. Additionally, Bamford's daughter Jade portrays Mia as a child, while Carly Akin portrays her as a teenager.

=== Filming ===
Filming for the episode began on January 22, 2019, and ended on February 1, 2019. A memorial dedication to Arrow crew member Jack Wright, who died on February 2, was shown following the conclusion of the episode: "In Loving Memory of Jack Wright 1936 – 2019".

== Reception ==
=== Broadcast ===
"Star City 2040" was first aired in the United States on The CW on March 18, 2019. It was watched by 1.60 million viewers with a 0.3/1 share among adults aged 18 to 49.

=== Critical response ===
On review aggregator website Rotten Tomatoes, the episode holds an approval rating of 100% based on 10 reviews, with an average rating of 7.26/10. The critics consensus reads, " "Star City 2040" takes Arrow back to the future and stays there in a twisty adventure that avoids feeling like a wheel-spinning tangent and instead succeeds as a nifty summation of the season's themes."

Allison Shoemaker of The A.V. Club gave the episode a B rating, saying it "doesn't pull it all off. The fact that it manages to successfully accomplish any of those things in such a stuffed hour is impressive." Jesse Schedeen of IGN rated the episode 6.3 out of 10, saying, "This is a story burdened by too many superfluous characters and an antagonist that recycles the usual tropes. But when the focus narrows to the Queen/Smoak family and their collective emotional trauma, this storyline shows its true potential." Delia Harrington of Den of Geek rated the episode three out of five, saying, "We haven't spent enough time in the future, so we weren't emotionally invested enough for this episode to hit as powerfully as it could. Still, it was a fun one, and I hope it's a hint of things to come." Chancellor Agard of Entertainment Weekly said, "Overall, this was a perfectly fine episode of the show. I'm still not sure what the point of the flash-forwards is, but throwing Felicity into the mix definitely helped elevate them."
