= Emerald Archer (disambiguation) =

Emerald Archer may refer to:

- Green Arrow, also known as the Emerald Archer
- Oliver Queen (Arrowverse), also known as the Emerald Archer
- "Emerald Archer" (Arrow episode)
