= Arrow season 7 =

Arrow
- Season 7
- Home media cover
- Showrunner: Beth Schwartz
- Starring: Stephen Amell; David Ramsey; Emily Bett Rickards; Echo Kellum; Rick Gonzalez; Juliana Harkavy; Colton Haynes; Kirk Acevedo; Sea Shimooka; Katie Cassidy
- No. of episodes: 22

Release
- Original network: The CW
- Original release: October 15, 2018 – May 13, 2019

Season chronology
- ← Previous; Season 6 Next → Season 8

The seventh season of the American television series Arrow premiered on The CW on October 15, 2018, and concluded on May 13, 2019, after 22 total episodes. The series is based on the DC Comics character Green Arrow, a costumed crime-fighter created by Mort Weisinger and George Papp, and is set in the Arrowverse, sharing continuity with other Arrowverse television series. The showrunner for this season was Beth Schwartz. Stephen Amell stars as Oliver Queen and the following principal cast members have returned from previous seasons: David Ramsey as John Diggle, Emily Bett Rickards as Felicity Smoak, Echo Kellum as Curtis Holt, Rick Gonzalez as Rene Ramirez, Juliana Harkavy as Dinah Drake, and Katie Cassidy Rodgers as Laurel Lance. Colton Haynes, a principal cast member for seasons two and three and a special guest actor for seasons four and six, was reinstated as a series regular for the seventh season as Roy Harper. They are joined by Kirk Acevedo as Ricardo Diaz, who was promoted to a series regular from his recurring status in the previous season, and new cast member Sea Shimooka.

The series follows billionaire playboy Oliver Queen (Stephen Amell), who claimed to have spent five years shipwrecked on Lian Yu, a mysterious island in the North China Sea, before returning home to Starling City (later renamed "Star City") to fight crime and corruption as a secret vigilante whose weapon of choice is a bow and arrow. In the seventh season taking place five months after Oliver's imprisonment, Diaz has recruited the Longbow Hunters, consisting of Kodiak (Michael Jonsson), Silencer (Miranda Edwards), and Red Dart (Holly Elissa Dignard) for a new criminal agenda, including seeking revenge on Oliver's loved ones and allies. After Oliver is released from prison while taking down Diaz in the process, he and the former members of Team Arrow are deputized and begin working alongside the police. Another hooded archer, later revealed to be Oliver's second half-sister Emiko Queen (Sea Shimooka) emerges as the new Green Arrow, seemingly to fight crime on Oliver's behalf. However, Emiko is revealed to be the leader of the Ninth Circle, a terrorist group that begins launching several attacks upon Star City, and is seeking to destroy Oliver's legacy as the Green Arrow ever since she was raised by them. Green Arrow defeats the Ninth Circle at the cost of a repentant Emiko's life. The season features flash-forwards twenty years into the future to Oliver's now adult son William (Ben Lewis) who seeks out Roy Harper on Lian Yu where they discover instructions left by Felicity leading them back to Star City. There they discover more secrets, including Oliver and Felicity's hidden daughter Mia (Katherine McNamara) while they work to save the city from another attack by Galaxy One and the security program Archer.

The series was renewed for its seventh season on April 2, 2018, and filming began in Vancouver, British Columbia, Canada on July 6, 2018, and ended on April 11, 2019. This season features the directorial debut of cast member David Ramsey, and includes the fifth annual Arrowverse crossover with the series The Flash and Supergirl. The season was released on DVD and Blu-ray on August 20, 2019. The series was renewed for an eighth and final season on January 31, 2019.

== Episodes ==
Arrow, season 7 episodes
No. overall	No. in season	Title	Directed by	Written by	Original release date	Prod. code	U.S. viewers (millions)
139	1	"Inmate 4587"	James Bamford	Beth Schwartz & Oscar Balderrama	October 15, 2018	T27.13651	1.43
Five months after being exposed as Green Arrow and into his life sentence, Oliver Queen tries to maintain a low profile in Slabside Maximum Security Prison in hopes of getting a reduced sentence, an effort which is complicated when Danny "Brick" Brickwell tries to coerce Oliver into helping him and by him being stalked by Ricardo Diaz's associates. Meanwhile, Felicity Smoak and William Clayton try to cope with witness protection while John Diggle and A.R.G.U.S. continue hunting the fugitive Diaz. Back in Star City, a new vigilante archer appears on the scene, targeting criminals on their list while also helping the city's poor. After being saved from a group of criminals, Rene Ramirez decides to trust the vigilante, despite not knowing who is under the hood. The rest of Team Arrow do not trust the archer and Dinah Drake is determined to make an arrest. Because the archer's tactics, skills, and appearance parallel Oliver's suited persona, the media dubs the vigilante as the new Green Arrow. After being discovered by Diaz, Felicity leaves witness protection to help capture him. In a flashforward, set twenty years in the future, an adult William seeks out Roy Harper on Lian Yu.
140	2	"The Longbow Hunters"	Laura Belsey	Jill Blankenship & Rebecca Bellotto	October 22, 2018	T27.13652	1.18
The Longbow Hunters arrive in Star City and the team works together with A.R.G.U.S. to try and stop them from stealing a weapon with incredible destructive capabilities. Felicity and Diggle clash over their priorities in dealing with Diaz, leading Felicity to strike a deal with Agent Watson. Meanwhile, Laurel Lance and Dinah are forced to put their feud aside and work together, while Oliver tries to get rid of a prison guard in exchange for info on Diaz from Brick. In flashforwards, William reveals he was led to Lian Yu by GPS coordinates provided by Felicity. He and Roy dig up Oliver's hidden stash and find a clue in his bow which leads them back to Star City.
141	3	"Crossing Lines"	Gordon Verheul	Story by : Elizabeth Kim; Teleplay by : Onalee Hunter Hughes & Sarah Tarkoff	October 29, 2018	T27.13653	1.15
Oliver demands Brick honor their deal and Brick says an inmate known as "The Demon" is Diaz's direct connection to Slabside. Brick claims to have arranged a meet with the Demon, but Oliver is instead ambushed. After defeating Brick's hired men, Brick reveals the Demon is incarcerated on Level Two, prompting Oliver to attack a guard to get transferred there. Meanwhile, Felicity plans a trap for Diaz and the Longbow Hunters at the CDC along with Rene and Dinah. The plan fails and Agent Watson is transferred, but it is revealed that Rene and Felicity captured Silencer, one of the Longbow Hunters. Elsewhere, Diggle, Lyla, and Curtis track Diaz's finances to a bank in Zürich. Lyla reveals she is working behind the backs of A.R.G.U.S.' top brass, suspecting a mole.
142	4	"Level Two"	Ben Bray	Emilio Ortega Aldrich & Tonya Kong	November 5, 2018	T27.13654	1.08
In prison, Oliver is tortured both psychologically and by means of drugs and electrical devices, in order to "reprogram" his brain. In Star City, Dinah arrests Rene when she learns that he is providing support to the new Green Arrow but, when the vigilante saves Zoe Ramirez's life, she has a change of heart. Working together, Dinah, Rene, and the vigilante are able to capture a group of arsonists plaguing Star City. Elsewhere, Felicity enlists the help of Laurel to torture the Silencer for information on Diaz, but to no avail. Felicity allows her to escape in the hope that she will lead them to Diaz, having planted a bug in her belt. In flashforwards, William and Roy are in Star City, but the coordinates change, leading them to what remains of Smoak Technologies. William solves a puzzle and obtains a Rubik's Cube. He and Roy are attacked by the police, but rescued by Dinah, who leads them to safety and an adult Zoe. The two are part of a vigilante resistance group known as the Canary Network. After William solves the second puzzle, Dinah claims that Felicity is dead.
143	5	"The Demon"	Mark Bunting	Benjamin Raab & Deric A. Hughes	November 12, 2018	T27.13655	1.26
After having seemingly been broken, Oliver is introduced to Level Two, a secret facility below Slabside, where inmates are kept in inhumane conditions and forcibly become experimental test subjects overseen by Dr. Jarrett Parker. He discovers that Talia al Ghul is the Demon. He reluctantly teams up with Talia to plan an escape, but decides not to escape himself to avoid having to spend the rest of his life as a fugitive. After collecting evidence of what happened in Level Two, he asks Talia to deliver it to Felicity, causing the facility to be shut down and Oliver to get transferred back to Level One. Though Talia gets her revenge on a now-fired Dr. Parker by ambushing him while he was loading his car. Elsewhere, Curtis gets back in the field with Diggle and helps capture an international terrorist following a lead from the Zürich bank. Curtis discovers that A.R.G.U.S. is trying to get rid of the terrorist's possessions and recovers a painting of Dante Alighieri. Laurel plans to use the evidence that Oliver collected to plead for his release.
144	6	"Due Process"	Kristin Windell	Sarah Tarkoff & Tonya Kong	November 19, 2018	T27.13656	1.03
Diaz slaughters the Bratva and tortures Anatoly Knyazev in order to get in contact with one of his former KGB associates. Team Arrow rescues Anatoly and discovers that Diaz plans to level Star City with aerial explosives obtained from the associate. Team Arrow foils the plan and finally captures Diaz with help from the new Green Arrow. Meanwhile, in Slabside, Stanley Dover is accused of murdering a guard, but proclaims his innocence. Oliver finds the knife used in the attack, which belonged to Brick's associate Ben Turner. Released from solitary confinement, Stanley thanks Oliver, but inadvertently reveals knowing that the knife belonged to Turner, information he could not have gotten in solitary. At Star City Police Department (SCPD), Laurel orchestrates a deal which will see Oliver walk out of prison in exchange for helping the FBI with their case against Diaz. In flashforwards, Roy reveals that the clue they found on Lian Yu was the "Mark of Four," which Dinah recognizes. William and Roy learn that, before her apparent death, Felicity became a criminal, taking on her father's mantle as the Calculator. They, along with Dinah and Zoe, find Felicity's plans for the destruction of Star City.
145	7	"The Slabside Redemption"	James Bamford	Jill Blankenship & Rebecca Bellotto	November 26, 2018	T27.13657	1.31
Oliver is told that he is set to be released from prison. Oliver confronts Stanley about his framing Turner for the guard's murder and then visits Turner, promising to help him once he is out of prison. Diaz arrives at Slabside via prisoner transport, but bribes a guard to release him and then visits Oliver, threatening to kill him and his family. After guards refuse to take his warnings about Diaz seriously, Oliver breaks out of his cell and escapes Level One in order to contact Team Arrow. Diaz cuts communications from the prison, preventing Oliver from getting outside help, and releases all prisoners, starting a riot. Turner turns on both Brick and Derek Sampson and helps Oliver get to a final showdown with Diaz, killing Sampson in the process. During their fight, Oliver stabs Diaz in his cell and locks him in it. Elsewhere, Stanley kills Brick and escapes. Oliver is finally set free from prison and reunites with Felicity and John.
146	8	"Unmasked"	Alexandra La Roche	Oscar Balderrama & Beth Schwartz	December 3, 2018	T27.13658	1.35
Now free from prison, Oliver tries to readjust to outside life. When a murder occurs at a party honoring Oliver, the new Green Arrow is suspected and Oliver, Dinah, and Rene set out to prove the vigilante's innocence. Meanwhile, Oliver and Felicity struggle to adjust to the changes Oliver's incarceration inflicted upon their lives and relationship. After she helps Oliver arrest Max Fuller for orchestrating Frank Cassady's murders of Sam Hutchinson and Clayton Ford, Dinah authorizes Oliver to work with the SCPD as a special deputy in order to avoid the anti-vigilante law, much to the annoyance of Mayor Emily Pollard. Diggle and Lyla connect the Dante painting and the Zürich finances to an individual who has a transaction history with multiple terrorist cells, including both the Longbow Hunters and Diaz. Unbeknownst to Team Arrow, they pay Diaz a visit in prison to request his assistance. Meanwhile, the new Green Arrow is revealed as Robert Queen's daughter. In flashforwards, Dinah, William, and Zoe track down a woman known as Blackstar, who had ties to Felicity's plans. Dinah reveals the meaning of the Mark of Four; it was a signal Oliver made up to bring the team back together if needed.
147	9	"Elseworlds, Part 2"	James Bamford	Story by : Caroline Dries; Teleplay by : Marc Guggenheim	December 10, 2018	T27.13659	2.06
Oliver, Barry Allen, and Kara Danvers head to Gotham City to find John Deegan, but are quickly arrested. However, they are bailed out by Kate Kane, who tells them Deegan can be found at Arkham Asylum. With some assistance from Oliver and Barry's teams, they break in to confront Deegan and retrieve the book he used to rewrite reality, only for the doctor to escape by causing a mass breakout. While trying to contain it, Batwoman shows up to help them before telling them to leave Gotham. Returning to A.R.G.U.S., the heroes attempt to unlock the book when the Flash of Earth-90 breaches through to them and warns them of the Monitor. Oliver, Barry, Kara, and Earth-90's Flash go to confront the Monitor, but the omnipotent being escapes and returns the book to Deegan, who changes reality once more. This time, Oliver and Barry wake up as wanted criminals and are forced to contend with both the police and a black-suited Superman. Note : This episode continues a crossover event that begins on The Flash season 5 episode 9 and concludes on Supergirl season 4 episode 9.
148	10	"My Name Is Emiko Queen"	Andi Armaganian	Benjamin Raab & Deric A. Hughes	January 21, 2019	T27.13660	1.22
Oliver discovers blood belonging to the new Green Arrow and Felicity determines that it belongs to a woman named Emiko Queen, Oliver's father's illegitimate daughter and thus his paternal half-sister. Oliver goes through his father's belongings and discovers that his mother knew about Emiko and her mother Kazumi Adachi. After being injured, Emiko goes to Rene for help and reveals that she seeks to avenge her mother's murder in the Glades. Emiko visits her father's grave, where she is confronted by Oliver. Meanwhile, in order to be able to work without A.R.G.U.S. oversight, Diggle and Lyla restore the Suicide Squad as the Ghost Initiative, recruiting Diaz as its first member and implanting an explosive into his neck to ensure his compliance in tracking down terrorist financier Dante. In the flashforwards, Dinah confronts Rene, who is now the mayor of the Glades (which is thriving thanks to a security program called Archer), and forces him to help her. Later, Rene meets with someone who is linked to the bomb plans, explicitly stating that their plans to build up the Glades will sacrifice the rest of the city.
149	11	"Past Sins"	David Ramsey	Onalee Hunter Hughes & Tonya Kong	January 28, 2019	T27.13661	1.18
Felicity and Laurel work together to track down a person Laurel believes may have followed her from Earth-2. The person is eventually revealed as the Earth-1 version of the drunk, Brett Collins, who accidentally killed Laurel's father. The Earth-2 version of Brett is revealed to have died five years earlier. Diaz attempts a mass breakout from A.R.G.U.S., killing Curtis in the process, before it is revealed he was in a controlled virtual reality simulation conceived by Curtis to extract information regarding Dante. The SCPD is held hostage by a suicide bomber using electricity who reveals himself to be Sam Hackett, the son of Dave Hackett from the Queen's Gambit whom Robert killed so Oliver could survive. Sam wants Oliver dead, forcing the officers to either kill him or die. Oliver reasons with Sam long enough for Dinah to cut the power, removing his powers and allowing Oliver to apprehend him. Emiko starts to see the good in Oliver and thinks about starting to talk. Dinah reads a note from an unknown source stating that someone will kill the vigilantes one by one.
150	12	"Emerald Archer"	Glen Winter	Marc Guggenheim & Emilio Ortega Aldrich	February 4, 2019	T27.13662	1.07
Oliver allows a camera crew to follow himself and others associated with Team Arrow around and film a documentary titled The Hood and the Rise of Vigilantes. A new vigilante, named Chimera by Curtis, begins attacking vigilantes in Star City, including Ragman, Huntress, and the new Green Arrow. William returns from witness protection and tells Felicity he was expelled from school, while Oliver debates Mayor Pollard about vigilantism but is interrupted by Chimera. During the attack, Dinah saves Pollard using her Canary Cry, revealing her identity as the Black Canary. When Team Arrow arrives and helps Oliver capture Chimera, Pollard arrests them, prompting Oliver and Dinah to turn themselves in and resulting in Pollard deputizing Team Arrow as part of the SCPD. In flashforwards, it is shown that Blackstar is watching the documentary on Oliver. With intel gained from the documentary, Blackstar and Connor Hawke find the destroyed Team Arrow bunker.
151	13	"Star City Slayer"	Gregory Smith	Beth Schwartz & Jill Blankenship	February 11, 2019	T27.13663	1.09
Members of Team Arrow receive threatening notes and discover a similar note at the murder scene of a councilman who previously worked with Ricardo Diaz. Tracking a drug used to immobilize the victim, they discover the hiding place of the "Star City Slayer," who is revealed as Stanley. He slits Dinah's throat, but Curtis cauterizes the wound, saving her life. Stanley confronts Oliver, Felicity, and William at their apartment, claiming to be the only one who truly understands Oliver. While Felicity distracts Stanley, Oliver subdues him and he is sent back to Slabside. William, wanting a normal life, chooses to live with his grandparents. Curtis accepts a job in Washington, D.C. and leaves Star City, signing sole ownership of their Helix company over to Felicity. Meanwhile, a medical checkup discovers something important about Felicity. In flashforwards, Dinah, Roy, William, and Zoe find the Arrow bunker and get into a fight with Blackstar and Connor Hawke. Blackstar claims that Felicity is alive before revealing that she is Mia Smoak, the daughter of Oliver and Felicity, and William's half-sister.
152	14	"Brothers & Sisters"	Marcus Stokes	Rebecca Bellotto & Jeane Wong	March 4, 2019	T27.13664	0.89
Felicity and Laurel continue growing closer, with Felicity revealing to her that she is pregnant with Oliver's child. John and Lyla successfully locate Dante with the Ghost Initiative, identifying A.R.G.U.S. Director Bell as the mole. During the operation to catch Dante, Diaz betrays the team to warn him and he escapes, killing Bell and potential client Quraci Princess Noor in the process. Diaz is taken back to Slabside, where an unseen assailant lights him on fire in his cell, killing him. The Ghost Initiative having been exposed, John takes the fall for his wife and hands in his resignation. Oliver and Rene work together with Emiko to find out who killed her mother. In her hideout, Emiko meets Dante, revealing they are working together. In the flashforwards, Mia and William start working together to locate Felicity.
153	15	"Training Day"	Ruba Nadda	Emilio Ortega Aldrich & Rebecca Rosenberg	March 11, 2019	T27.13665	1.02
Team Arrow works with the SCPD to take down an operation that is manufacturing poison bullets. When the initial attempt as part of the SCPD fails, Team Arrow goes rogue and successfully takes down the operation as vigilantes, resulting in Mayor Pollard creating a special vigilante task force that is sanctioned by the SCPD and made up of Team Arrow. Dinah, who can no longer fully perform the Canary Cry following her injury, decides to return to the field as part of the task force. Laurel visits Slabside, where Ben Turner tells her that he witnessed the new Green Arrow kill Diaz. Laurel confronts Emiko, who states that no one would believe Black Siren, a former criminal. In the flashforwards, Mia and William obtain a recorder and play a tape from Felicity, where she gives coordinates to the other members of the team. The two ignore Felicity's orders to leave Star City and instead follow the coordinates to the Glades.
154	16	"Star City 2040"	James Bamford	Beth Schwartz & Oscar Balderrama	March 18, 2019	T27.13666	1.00
In the flashforwards, Mia and William follow Felicity's coordinates to Galaxy One headquarters. They are almost caught, but are saved by Connor, who reveals himself as an agent of Knightwatch, a "good version of A.R.G.U.S." Meanwhile, Rene confronts Dinah, Roy, and Zoe, revealing that Galaxy One plans to blow up Star City to rebuild it like the Glades, but the city will be evacuated beforehand. The three discover that a terrorist organization named Eden Corps, that uses Galaxy One as a front, paid the SCPD to fake Felicity's death. Mia, William, and Connor enter the headquarters' sublevels, where they find an imprisoned Felicity who claims that the building houses the bombs to be used on Star City. The others reunite with the group before they meet Rene, who has learned that the bombs are already on-site and that there are no plans to evacuate. The group infiltrates a party where Mia destroys an electronic device held by Galaxy One head Keven Dale, disabling the bombs. Dale unveils a helmet that would enable Galaxy One to take the Archer program global. Felicity makes amends with Mia, stating that her grudge with Galaxy One is personal. In the present, Felicity activates Archer.
155	17	"Inheritance"	Patia Prouty	Sarah Tarkoff & Elizabeth Kim	March 25, 2019	T27.13667	1.01
Laurel tells Oliver about Emiko killing Diaz. Oliver finds Emiko and Dante stealing drones and confronts Emiko, who states that she owes Dante and the Ninth Circle for helping her when she was abandoned by her father. Using Archer, Team Arrow locates Dante and, when he seemingly believes Emiko has betrayed him, Oliver saves her and takes her back to the Arrow bunker. However, she escapes after being caught planting a jammer, which takes down Archer and allows the Ninth Circle to steal Sarin gas. Team Arrow tracks the Sarin drones to an airfield, where Oliver disables all but one of them, which gets away thanks to Emiko and releases the gas over an abandoned building. Emiko is revealed as the leader of the Ninth Circle and tells Dante about Archer. She also frames Laurel for killing an SCPD witness while releasing photos of her with Diaz to the press. Meanwhile, Felicity founds Smoak Technologies and hires Alena Whitlock as her CTO. Flashbacks show Emiko being abandoned by her father and meeting Dante. As an adult, she goes to her father for business help, but gets turned down, which leads to her staying silent about the explosives on board the Queen's Gambit.
156	18	"Lost Canary"	Kristin Windell	Jill Blankenship & Elisa Delson	April 15, 2019	T27.13668	0.71
Laurel goes on the run and partners up with a former associate named Shadow Thief. Felicity discovers that Emiko framed Laurel, but Dinah informs her that Laurel has gone back to committing crime as Black Siren. After failing to convince Laurel to come back, Felicity recruits Sara Lance to come to her and Dinah's aid. The three confront Laurel about what she wants to be, which leads to her turning on Shadow Thief. Dinah clears Laurel's reputation by claiming she went undercover. Laurel decides to return to Earth-2 to right her wrongs as Black Canary. Meanwhile, Oliver and Diggle track the rifle used to kill Emiko's mother and discover it belongs to Kodiak of the Longbow Hunters. Through interrogation, they find out he was hired by Dante. In the flashforwards, Galaxy One unleashes Zeta, a new force hunting down the Canary Network with a tech helmet powered by the Archer program. While the others want to hide, Mia wants to fight back and ambushes one of the Zetas. Mia is overpowered, but is saved by Laurel, who tells her to give the Zeta's helmet to Felicity.
157	19	"Spartan"	Avi Youabian	Benjamin Raab & Deric A. Hughes	April 22, 2019	T27.13669	0.71
With the Ninth Circle after a Department of Defense vault drive, Diggle contacts his stepfather, General Roy Stewart, but Stewart refuses to give up classified intel. After they steal Archer from Smoak Tech, Stewart reveals the drive contains an asset list the Ninth Circle can now track. While securing the assets, Diggle and Stewart are captured by Dante. Stewart surrenders codes for a biological weapon called Cygnus X-1 when Dante starts torturing Diggle. The two call in Team Arrow with the Spartan helmet and escape. Team Arrow tracks Archer and the Ninth Circle to Cygnus X-1. While the rest destroy Archer, Oliver confronts Emiko, telling her Dante had her mother killed. Dante exfiltrates Emiko and they escape with Cygnus X-1, after which Emiko kills Dante. Diggle makes amends with Stewart after learning he is blameless in his father's death. Alena copied Archer's root code and suggests a partnership with Magnus Labs to expand it, but Felicity refuses to rebuild it. In the flashforwards, Mia and Connor obtain a power module for the tech helmet from the Deathstroke gang, led by Connor's adoptive brother John "J.J." Diggle Jr., but are afterwards attacked by them. Felicity powers up the helmet and learns Galaxy One has expanded Archer.
158	20	"Confessions"	Tara Miele	Onalee Hunter Hughes & Emilio Ortega Aldrich	April 29, 2019	T27.13670	0.64
Dinah and Sergeant Bingsley interrogate Team Arrow, who are in SCPD custody accused of killing two subway station security guards. They reveal they recruited Roy Harper to help with an operation where they successfully prevented the Ninth Circle from releasing their biological weapon. After Oliver names Emiko as the killer, the team is released since their stories line up. It is revealed that they all lied and that Dinah was part of the operation, in which Roy killed the guards in a fit of rage. The team decides to protect Roy in order to save the team and be able to continue hunting the Ninth Circle. Oliver recognizes the bloodlust he witnessed and meets a remorseful Roy, who reveals that he died battling the Thanatos Guild and was then revived by Thea Queen and Nyssa al Ghul via a Lazarus Pit. Felicity locates the Ninth Circle's headquarters, where Oliver confronts Emiko, who reveals she has sent the subway station security footage to Bingsley. Emiko comes clean about her role in Robert Queen's death and states that her goal is to destroy Oliver's legacy while he dies a villain like their father. Emiko blows up the building, burying Oliver.
159	21	"Living Proof"	Gordon Verheul	Oscar Balderrama & Sarah Tarkoff	May 6, 2019	T27.13671	0.63
Oliver is trapped one floor below his team. The physical and psychological trauma causes him to hallucinate Tommy Merlyn talking to him about how to deal with Emiko. Oliver refuses to listen to Tommy about using the best parts of himself to save her until he envisions a scenario where his vendetta against Emiko leads to the deaths of his teammates. Team Arrow locates Oliver and saves him. Meanwhile, the SCPD raids Smoak Tech, accusing Team Arrow of both the cover-up and the biological weapon, which was traced to Archer. Felicity and Alena escape to the bunker, where they are confronted by Emiko, who leaves after Felicity reveals she is pregnant. Emiko is revealed to have stolen Oliver's arrows and attacks the SCPD as the Green Arrow, stealing the weapon back. Oliver tries to reason with Emiko and refuses to take the opportunity to kill her, allowing her to escape. In the flashforwards, the group sets out to destroy Archer as Felicity contacts Alena, who stole the program and sold it to Galaxy One. William returns to Galaxy One headquarters to steal Archer's root code, but he and Rene are caught. Galaxy One enters the hideout to arrest the others.
160	22	"You Have Saved This City"	James Bamford	Beth Schwartz & Rebecca Bellotto	May 13, 2019	T27.13672	0.95
Emiko spreads the virus throughout the city and holds the detonator in the former Queen Consolidated building. Team Arrow, with Curtis, Laurel, and Ben Turner, evacuates it and disables the relay to the other bombs, while Oliver confronts Emiko, pleading for her to abandon the dark path. Beatrice informs Emiko that her failure to destroy Star City, while publicly exposing the Ninth Circle, has led to the council turning on her. Oliver and Emiko fight the Ninth Circle together, but Emiko is mortally wounded by Beatrice and tells Oliver to hide Felicity and their baby, before he escapes the exploding building. Oliver and Felicity invent the Mark of Four before leaving Star City for Bloomfield. Following Mia's birth, the Monitor appears, demanding Oliver hold up his part of their deal. (Note: As depicted in the final episode of the "Elseworlds" crossover.) Oliver leaves with him to assist in the oncoming crisis, despite learning he will die in it. In the flashforwards, Connor and Zoe save the others. Felicity creates a computer virus that Mia and William upload to destroy Archer. The older generation leaves the younger in charge of protecting the city. After a moment with her children at Oliver's grave, Felicity leaves with the Monitor to reunite with Oliver at a place of no return.

== Cast and characters ==
=== Main ===
- Stephen Amell as Oliver Queen / Green Arrow / Flash
- David Ramsey as John Diggle / Spartan
- Emily Bett Rickards as Felicity Smoak / Overwatch
- Echo Kellum as Curtis Holt / Mr. Terrific (Note: Kellum is credited in the main cast for the first thirteen episodes of the season and as a special guest star in the finale.)
- Rick Gonzalez as Rene Ramirez / Wild Dog
- Juliana Harkavy as Dinah Drake / Black Canary
- Colton Haynes as Roy Harper / Arsenal
- Kirk Acevedo as Ricardo Diaz / Dragon (Note: Acevedo is only credited for the first fourteen episodes of the season.)
- Sea Shimooka as Emiko Queen / Green Arrow (Note: Shimooka is credited beginning with the eighth episode of the season.)
- Katie Cassidy Rodgers (Note: Cassidy Rodgers is credited as "Katie Cassidy" for the first nine episodes of the season.) as Laurel Lance / Black Siren / Black Canary (Earth-2) (Note: Earth-1 Laurel Lance / Black Canary is seen in archival footage in "Emerald Archer".)

=== Recurring ===
- Michael Jai White as Ben Turner / Bronze Tiger
- Vinnie Jones as Danny Brickwell
- Cody Runnels as Derek Sampson
- Jack Moore as William Clayton
  - Ben Lewis as adult William Clayton
- Brendan Fletcher as Stanley Dover / Star City Slayer
- Eliza Faria as Zoe Ramirez
  - Andrea Sixtos as adult Zoe Ramirez
- Holly Elissa as Red Dart
- Miranda Edwards as Honor / Silencer
- Michael Jonsson as Bear / Kodiak
- Audrey Marie Anderson as Lyla Michaels
- Laara Sadiq as Emily Pollard
- Katherine McNamara as Mia Smoak / Blackstar
- Raj Paul as Keven Dale
- Joseph David-Jones as adult Connor Hawke
- Adrian Paul as Dante
- Kacey Rohl as Alena Whitlock

=== Guest ===
- Sydelle Noel as Samanda Watson
- Jason E. Kelley as Dr. Jarrett Parker
- Lexa Doig as Talia al Ghul
- David Nykl as Anatoly Knyazev
- Aleks Paunovic as Felton
- Marcus Rosner as Max Fuller
- John Wesley Shipp as Barry Allen / Flash of Earth-90
- LaMonica Garrett as Mar Novu / Monitor
- Grant Gustin as Barry Allen / Green Arrow
- Danielle Panabaker as Caitlin Snow and Killer Frost
- Carlos Valdes as Cisco Ramon
- Tyler Hoechlin as John Deegan / Superman
- Melissa Benoist as Kara Zor-El / Kara Danvers / Supergirl
- Jeremy Davies as John Deegan
- Ruby Rose as Kate Kane / Batwoman
- Bob Frazer as Roger Hayden / Psycho-Pirate
- Cassandra Jean Amell as Nora Fries
- Liam Hall as Joe Wilson / Kane Wolfman
- John Barrowman as Malcolm Merlyn / Dark Archer
- Tom Cavanagh as Eobard Thawne / Reverse-Flash
- Edward Foy as William Glenmorgan
- Kelly Hu as Chien Na Wei / China White
- Amy Gumenick as Carrie Cutter
- Luke Camilleri as Sam Hackett
- Nelson Wong as Rich Kannon
- Paul Blackthorne as Quentin Lance
- Willa Holland as Thea Queen
- Caity Lotz as Sara Lance / White Canary
- Joe Dinicol as Rory Regan
- Bex Taylor-Klaus as Cindy "Sin" Simone
- Venus Terzo as Elisa Schwartz
- Kelsey Grammer as Narrator (uncredited)
- Patrick Sabongui as David Singh
- Christopher Gerard as Virgil
- Andrew Kavadas as James Midas
- Danny Wattley as Sergeant Bingsley
- Katrina Law as Nyssa al Ghul
- Jamey Sheridan as Robert Queen
- Miya Cech as young Emiko Queen
- Jeanie Cloutier as Kazumi Adachi
- Carmel Amit as Aviva Metula / Shadow Thief
- Ernie Hudson as General Roy Stewart
- Colin Donnell as Tommy Merlyn
- Samantha Jo as Beatrice

== Production ==
=== Development ===
At the Television Critics Association winter press tour in January 2018, The CW president Mark Pedowitz said he was "optimistic" and "confident" about Arrow and the other Arrowverse shows returning next season, but added that it was too soon to announce anything just yet. On April 2, The CW renewed the series for its seventh season. Marc Guggenheim and Wendy Mericle stepped down as showrunners at the end of the sixth season, replaced by veteran writer Beth Schwartz as sole showrunner for the seventh season. Guggenheim, the series' co-developer, remains involved as an executive consultant.

=== Writing ===
In May 2018, outgoing showrunner Marc Guggenheim revealed that the Longbow Hunters, a villainous organization in DC Comics, would be teased in the sixth-season finale before being introduced in the seventh season. Following the conclusion of the sixth season, which marked the first time in the series' history where the season's main antagonist was still at large, Guggenheim's successor Beth Schwartz confirmed that Ricardo Diaz / Dragon would return and, like his comic book counterpart, establish the Longbow Hunters, "a legendary group of assassins Diaz recruits to get back at Team Arrow for toppling his nascent criminal empire at the end of season 6."

Schwartz revealed that "redemption" would be the theme of the seventh season, "since last season when Oliver outed his identity, the city is a little bit mixed about how they feel about the Green Arrow." Stephen Amell commented that there is "nothing about [Oliver] that's heroic" in the season premiere. While Schwartz confirmed that other characters would be influenced by the season's theme, she stated that after Black Siren committed several murders during her partnership with Diaz, she still has "a large way to go to redeem herself from last season." The previous season also left off with Team Arrow fractured and divided. This season sees its members redefining their roles and what it means to be heroes to an anti-vigilante Star City, while honoring "the sacrifice Oliver made for them." The showrunner named Felicity's storyline as one of her favorites for the season's first half. "We played her pretty parallel to Oliver, where she's hiding and not being herself. She's in protective custody, but when someone attacks her family, she can't ignore that, so she has to fight back." Schwartz also said that the season would be "grounded" and have a "dark" tone, similar to that of the first season.

The seventh season is the first time the series will employ a female-dominated writing staff, thanks to new writers being introduced this season. Schwartz said the seventh season would not be based on David S. Goyer's scrapped film Green Arrow: Escape From Super Max, which would have featured Oliver Queen being arrested, exposed as the Green Arrow, and attempting a prison escape. Amell reported that the season would employ a new storytelling technique. This was later revealed to be sporadic flashforwards, as opposed to the weekly flashbacks of seasons past. Schwartz named Westworld and This Is Us as inspirations for the time structure, and Prison Break as an inspiration for the prison arc. Amell also revealed that he requested that the seventh season be written as if it were the series' last.

=== Casting ===
Main cast members Stephen Amell, David Ramsey, Emily Bett Rickards, Echo Kellum, Rick Gonzalez, Juliana Harkavy, and Katie Cassidy Rodgers return from previous seasons as Oliver Queen / Green Arrow, John Diggle / Spartan, Felicity Smoak / Overwatch, Curtis Holt / Mr. Terrific, Rene Ramirez / Wild Dog, Dinah Drake / Black Canary, and Laurel Lance / Black Siren, respectively. The seventh season is the first not to feature original cast members Willa Holland and Paul Blackthorne, who play Thea Queen / Speedy and Quentin Lance, respectively, as series regulars following both actors' departures during the previous season. They did, however, reprise their roles for the series' 150th episode. On April 9, 2018, it was announced that Colton Haynes would return as a series regular for the seventh season after previously starring in the second and third seasons and making guest appearances in the fourth and sixth seasons as Roy Harper / Arsenal. On October 11, Kirk Acevedo was promoted to series regular status after previously recurring in the sixth season as main antagonist, Ricardo Diaz / Dragon. Sea Shimooka was introduced as a series regular during the season, playing Oliver's half-sister Emiko Queen. Kellum exited the series during the season, making his final appearance as a series regular in the episode "Star City Slayer". Acevedo also exited the series during the season, making his final appearance as a regular in the episode "Brothers & Sisters". On March 30, 2019, Rickards posted on Instagram that she would be leaving the series, making the seventh season her last as a member of the main cast. Series co-creator Greg Berlanti and Schwartz confirmed her departure later that day.

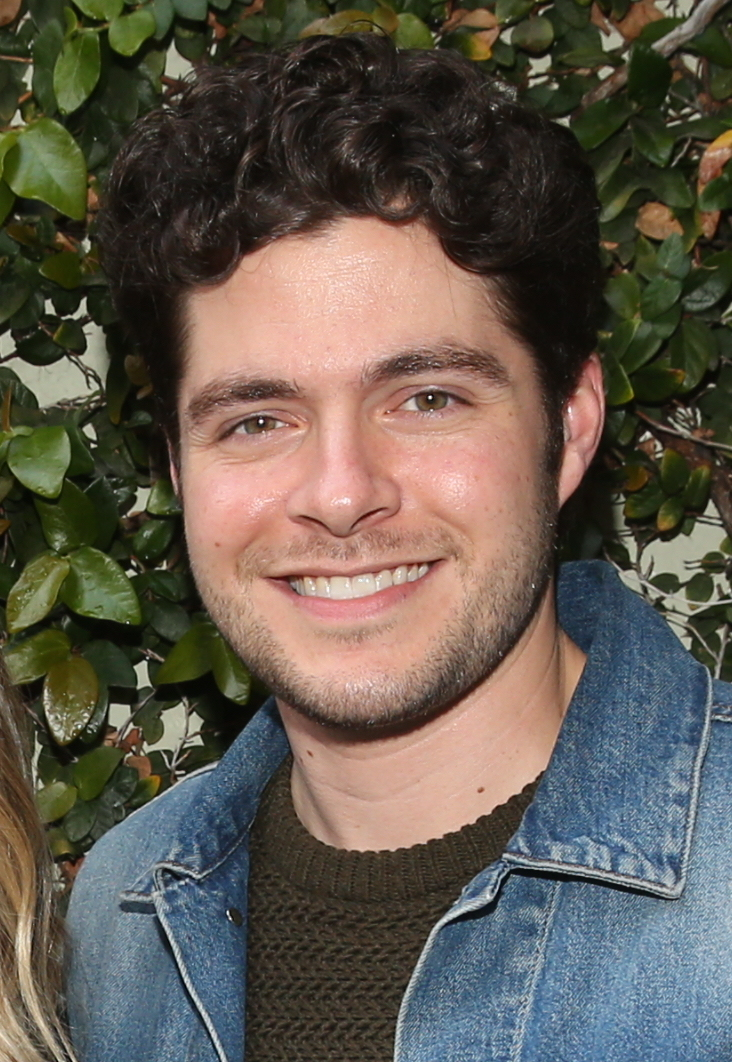
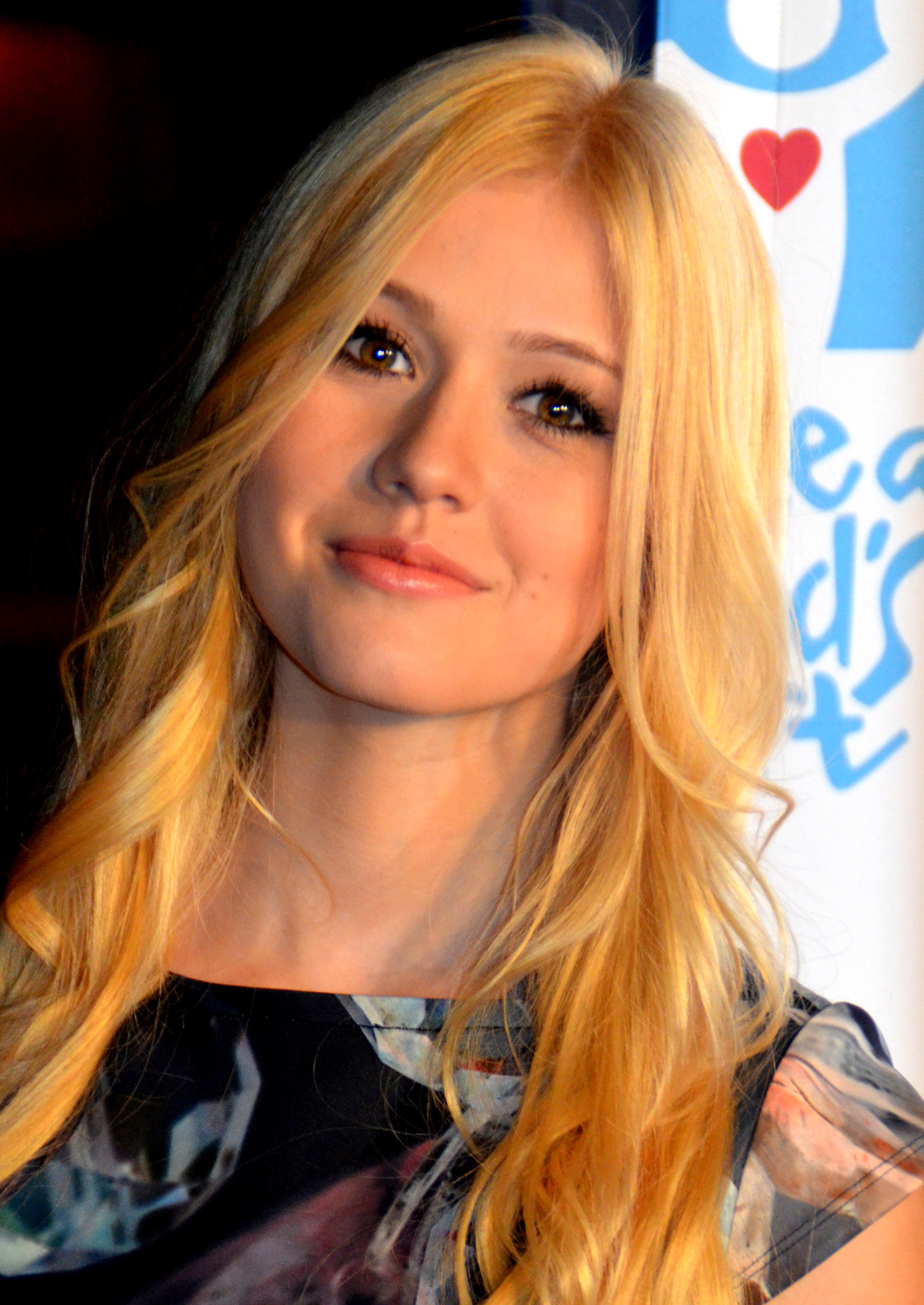
Ben Lewis and Katherine McNamara who debut in season seven as the adult versions of siblings William Clayton and Mia Smoak.

On July 21 at the series' San Diego Comic-Con 2018 panel, it was announced that the Longbow Hunters had been cast with Holly Elissa as Red Dart, Miranda Edwards as Silencer, and Michael Jonsson as Kodiak. It was also revealed that Michael Jai White, Vinnie Jones, and Cody Runnels would additionally recur as Ben Turner, Danny Brickwell, and Derek Sampson from previous seasons. On September 21, Katherine McNamara was cast in a recurring role as Maya, though her character was later revealed to be Oliver and Felicity's future daughter, Mia Smoak / Blackstar. Jack Moore returned in the role of Oliver's son William Clayton and Ben Lewis portrayed the character in flashforwards. Joseph David-Jones also recurs as Connor Hawke, John's adoptive son, in flashforwards. David-Jones previously played an alternate future version of John's biological son John Diggle, Jr., who went by Connor Hawke / Green Arrow, in the Legends of Tomorrow's first season episode "Star City 2046". Aiden Stoxx portrays the character as a child in the present. In March 2019, Adrian Paul joined the series in a recurring role as Dante.

=== Filming ===
Production for the season began on July 6, 2018, in Vancouver, British Columbia, Canada. In May 2018, Stephen Amell revealed that co-star David Ramsey would direct the eleventh episode of the season, marking Ramsey's directorial debut. Amell also grew a beard during the filming hiatus to accurately resemble the Green Arrow of the comics. Production wrapped on April 11, 2019.

=== Arrowverse tie-ins ===
In May 2018, Stephen Amell announced at The CW upfronts that the next Arrowverse crossover would feature Batwoman and Gotham City. The crossover "Elseworlds" is slated to launch a 2019 solo series for the character. The episode "Emerald Archer" featured appearances from Grant Gustin and Caity Lotz as Barry Allen and Sara Lance, respectively, for the series' 150th episode. Joseph David-Jones reprises his role as Connor Hawke from the Legends of Tomorrow episode "Star City 2046" where the character becomes the new Green Arrow in an alternate timeline.

== Marketing ==
The main cast of the season as well as executive producer Beth Schwartz attended San Diego Comic-Con on July 21, 2018, to promote the season.

== Release ==
=== Broadcast ===
In May 2018, it was announced that Arrow would move to Mondays for its seventh season, a first for the series, due to The CW's programming expansion to Sunday nights. On June 20, the network released its fall schedule, revealing that the series would additionally move from the 9:00 pm time-slot to the 8:00 pm time-slot. The season began airing in the United States on The CW on October 15, 2018, and completed its 22-episode run on May 13, 2019.

=== Home media ===
The season was released on DVD and Blu-ray on August 20, 2019, its special features including the fifth annual Arrowverse crossover event titled "Elseworlds".

== Reception ==
=== Critical response ===
The review aggregation website Rotten Tomatoes reports an 87% approval rating for the seventh season and an average rating of 7.36/10 based on 213 reviews. The site's critics consensus reads, "Arrow recovers from a creative rut by throwing Oliver Queen in the slammer and letting the series' reliable ensemble blossom into the forefront."

Reviewing for Den of Geek, Delia Harrington gave the premiere a rating of 3/5. She opined that Roy's inclusion in the season made his "moving sendoff" with Thea from last season feel "cheap" and that she remained "cautious" about the flashforward structure, but said that the episode was "solid" nonetheless. She concluded, "The Arrow Season 7 premiere manages to both wipe the slate clean and nod in the direction of the show's early glory." IGN's Jesse Schedeen wrote, "Arrow's Season 7 premiere kicks off the most significant status quo change in the series' history. Some of these sweeping changes are already working in the show's favor." He gave the episode a rating of 7.1/10, adding, "Arrow's seventh season has a promising start, though the premiere drags whenever Oliver Queen isn't the focus." Both Chancellor Agard of Entertainment Weekly and Allison Shoemaker of The A.V. Club gave the premiere a "B" grade and noted a comparison to ABC's Lost. Agard also praised Amell and Rickards' performances. Shoemaker explained that the episode "revisits a lot of familiar territory, but it breaks new ground for Arrow while having its priorities in precisely the right place. It's the beginning of a new era for Arrow, and whether you credit this episode's success to either focus or flash-forwards, it's a promising start."

=== Ratings ===
Viewership and ratings per episode of Arrow season 7
No.	Title	Air date	Rating/share (18–49)	Viewers (millions)	DVR (18–49)	DVR viewers (millions)	Total (18–49)	Total viewers (millions)
1	"Inmate 4587"	October 15, 2018	0.4/2	1.43	0.4	0.92	0.8	2.35
2	"The Longbow Hunters"	October 22, 2018	0.4/2	1.18	0.4	0.85	0.8	2.03
3	"Crossing Lines"	October 29, 2018	0.4/2	1.15	0.3	0.89	0.7	2.04
4	"Level Two"	November 5, 2018	0.3/1	1.08	0.4	0.90	0.7	1.98
5	"The Demon"	November 12, 2018	0.4/2	1.26	0.3	0.68	0.7	1.94
6	"Due Process"	November 19, 2018	0.3/1	1.03	0.3	0.78	0.6	1.81
7	"The Slabside Redemption"	November 26, 2018	0.4/2	1.31	0.3	0.81	0.7	2.12
8	"Unmasked"	December 3, 2018	0.5/2	1.35	0.3	0.89	0.8	2.24
9	"Elseworlds, Part 2"	December 10, 2018	0.8/3	2.06	0.5	1.40	1.3	3.46
10	"My Name Is Emiko Queen"	January 21, 2019	0.4/2	1.22	0.3	0.86	0.7	2.08
11	"Past Sins"	January 28, 2019	0.4/2	1.18	0.2	0.75	0.6	1.93
12	"Emerald Archer"	February 4, 2019	0.4/2	1.04	0.2	0.65	0.6	1.69
13	"Star City Slayer"	February 11, 2019	0.4/1	1.09	0.2	0.66	0.6	1.75
14	"Brothers & Sisters"	March 4, 2019	0.2/1	0.89	0.3	0.79	0.5	1.68
15	"Training Day"	March 11, 2019	0.3/1	1.02	0.3	0.63	0.6	1.65
16	"Star City 2040"	March 18, 2019	0.3/1	1.00	0.2	0.60	0.5	1.60
17	"Inheritance"	March 25, 2019	0.3/1	1.01	0.3	0.68	0.6	1.69
18	"Lost Canary"	April 15, 2019	0.2/1	0.71	0.3	0.65	0.5	1.36
19	"Spartan"	April 22, 2019	0.2/1	0.71	0.3	0.63	0.5	1.34
20	"Confessions"	April 29, 2019	0.2/1	0.64	0.2	0.62	0.4	1.26
21	"Living Proof"	May 6, 2019	0.2/1	0.63	0.2	0.53	0.4	1.16
22	"You Have Saved This City"	May 13, 2019	0.2/1	0.95	0.3	0.56	0.5	1.51

=== Accolades ===
Arrow, season 7 award nominations
Year	Award	Category	Nominee(s)	Result	Ref.
2019	Leo Awards	Best Stunt Coordination Dramatic Series	Jeff Robinson, Eli Zagoudakis ("The Slabside Redemption")	Won	
2019	Teen Choice Awards	Choice Action TV Actor	Stephen Amell	Won	
2019	Teen Choice Awards	Choice Action TV Actress	Emily Bett Rickards	Nominated	
2019	Teen Choice Awards	Choice Action TV Show	Arrow	Nominated	
2019	Saturn Awards	Best Superhero Television Series	Arrow	Nominated	
