= Emerald Archer (Arrow episode) =

- Arrow episode
- Oliver fighting Chimera
- Episode no.: Season 7 Episode 12
- Directed by: Glen Winter
- Written by: Marc Guggenheim; Emilio Aldrich
- Cinematography by: Neil Cervin
- Editing by: Patrick Brian
- Production code: T27.13662
- Original air date: April 2, 2019

Guest appearances
- Kelsey Grammer as narrator; Paul Blackthorne as Quentin Lance; Willa Holland as Thea Queen; Caity Lotz as Sara Lance; Bex Taylor-Klaus as Sin; Laara Sadiq as Mayor Pollard; Jack Moore as William Clayton (child); Ben Lewis as William Clayton (adult); Katherine McNamara as Blackstar; Joseph David-Jones as Conner Hawke; Jessica De Gouw as Helena Bertinelli; Venus Terzo as Dr. Schwartz; Jessica Heafey as Director; Ryan Handley as Chimera

Episode chronology
← Previous "Past Sins"	Next → "Star City Slayer"
- Arrow season 7

"Emerald Archer" is the twelfth episode of the seventh season and 150th overall of the American television series Arrow, based on the DC Comics character Green Arrow, revolving around billionaire playboy Oliver Queen as he returns to Star City, after having been shipwrecked for five years, and becomes a bow-wielding, hooded vigilante who sets out to fight crime and corruption. It is set in the Arrowverse, sharing continuity with the other television series of the universe. The episode was written by series developer Marc Guggenheim and executive story editor Emilio Aldrich and directed by Glen Winter.

"Emerald Archer" stars Stephen Amell as Oliver Queen. The episode uses the framing device of a documentary. It aired on The CW on April 2, 2019, to a live audience of 1.04 million viewers. The episode was met with mixed reactions from critics. The episode guest stars several former cast members including Willia Holland and Paul Blackthorne.

== Plot ==
In an effort to be more transparent with the public, Oliver Queen allows a camera crew to follow himself and others associated with Team Arrow around and film a documentary titled Emerald Archer: The Hood and the Rise of Vigilantes. A vigilante named Chimera begins to attack various vigilantes in Star City, including Ragman, the Huntress, and the new Green Arrow.

Oliver's son William Clayton returns home from the witness protection program. William reveals to Felicity Smoak that he was expelled from school. Meanwhile, Oliver debates Mayor Pollard about vigilantism but is interrupted by Chimera. During the attack, Dinah saves Pollard using her Canary Cry, accidentally revealing her identity as the Black Canary. When Team Arrow arrives and helps Oliver capture Chimera, Pollard arrests them, prompting Oliver and Dinah to turn themselves in and resulting in Pollard deputizing Team Arrow as part of the SCPD.

In 2040, it is shown that Blackstar is watching the documentary on Oliver. With intel gained from the documentary, Blackstar and Connor Hawke find discover the location of the now abandoned Team Arrow bunker.

== Production ==
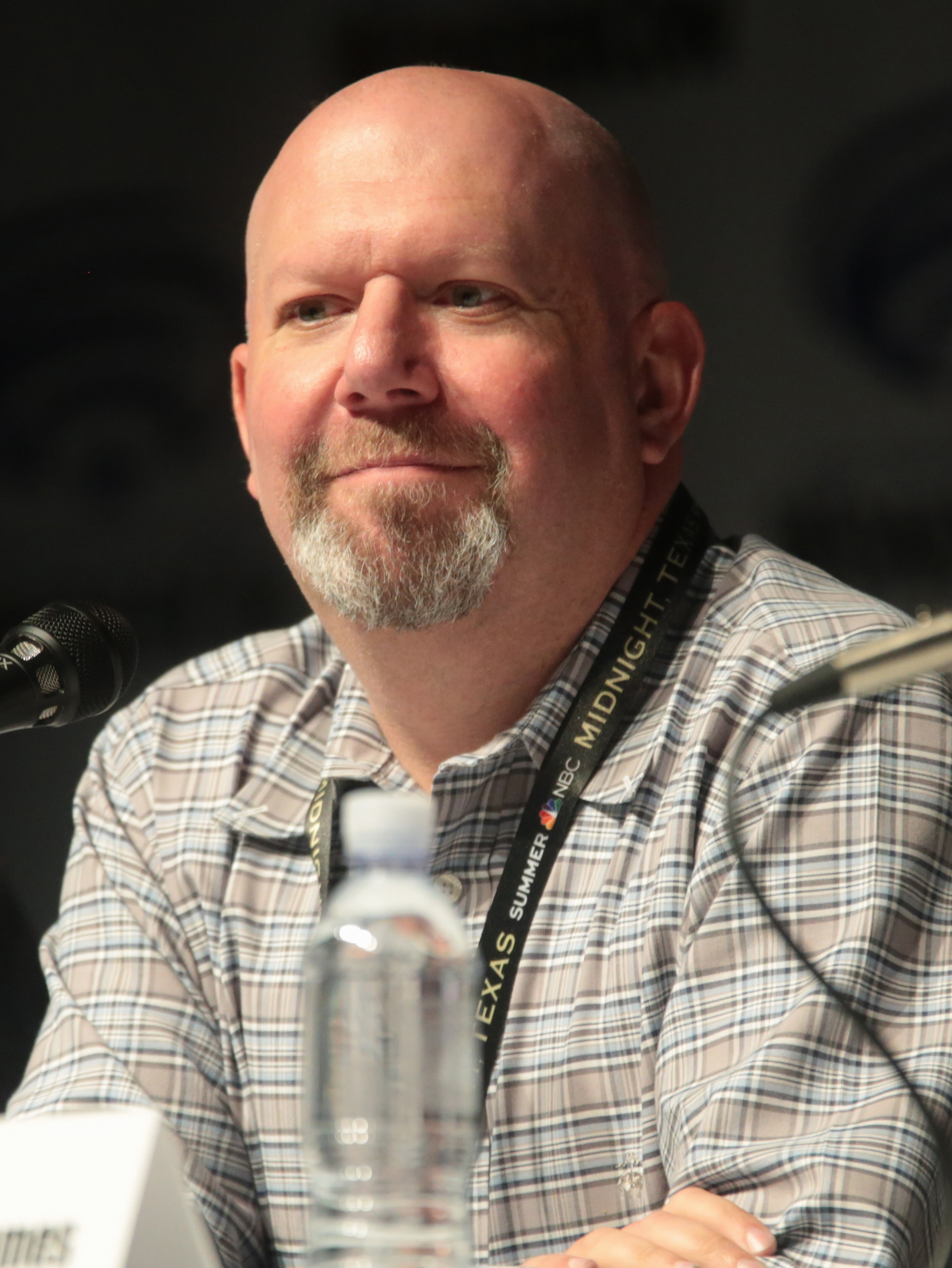
Series creator and executive producer Marc Guggenheim co-wrote the episode.

"Emerald Archer" was written by Emilio Aldrich and executive producer Marc Guggenheim and directed by Glen Winter. The episode is presented as a mockumentary. The episode features several nods to various people involved with both the Green Arrow comics and series including Beth Schwartz, Kevin Smith, and David Nutter. It is the 150th episode of Arrow, making it a milestone episode.

The episode is critical of the police system, while also questioning the in-universe vigilantes.

=== Casting ===
"Emerald Archer" stars Stephen Amell as Oliver Queen alongside David Ramsey, Emily Bett Rickards, Colton Haynes, Kirk Acevedo, Echo Kellum, Juliana Harkavy, Sea Shimooka, and Katie Cassidy Rodgers as John Diggle, Felicity Smoak, Roy Harper, Ricardo Diaz, Curtis Holt, Rene Ramirez, Dinah Drake, Emiko Adachi, and Laurel Lance respectively. To celebrate reaching 150 episodes, "Emerald Archer" features several returning characters from the series including former series regulars Paul Blackthorne and Willa Holland as Quentin Lance and Thea Queen respectively. Caity Lotz and Bex Taylor-Klaus who recurred in the second season appear as Sara Lance and Sin respectively. Jessica De Gouw returns as Helena Bertinelli via archive footage.

Jessica Heafey guests as the director of the documentary. Kelsey Grammer guest stars as the narrator of the documentary. Jack Moore appears as a child version of William Clayton, while Ben Lewis appears as the adult version in the flash forewords. Katherine McNamara guest stars as Blackstar. Joseph David-Jones guest stars as Conner Hawke. David-Jones previously appeared as the character in the Legends of Tomorrow episodes "Star City 2046" and "Marooned". Venus Terzo appears as Dr. Schwartz.

== Release ==
"Emerald Archer" was released on The CW on April 2, 2019, to a live audience of 1.07 million live viewers. The episode had a decrease of ninety thousand viewers from the 1.18 the previous episode, "Past Sins". The following episode, "Star City Slayer", gained twenty thousand viewers. When accounting for seven day DVR viewership the episode gains an additional 620 thousand viewers for a total of 1.69 million.

=== Critical reception ===
"Emerald Archer" was met with generally positive reactions from critics. Though, the mockumentary format held more mixed opinions. IGN's Jesse Scheeden described the episode as "fun" and "memorable" rating it a 9.1/10. Scheenden felt that the episode "hit all the right emotional notes." He praised the episode taking on a different format and praised the directing. Writing for Den of Geek, Delia Harrington rated the episode a 4/5. She praised the episodes format calling it genius. Harrington felt that while the episode did not go overboard with the amount of fan service that it included, it still had a fun amount.

The A.V. Club's Allision Shoemaker was far more negative rating the episode a C−. She felt that the episode was disappointing and unfunny, though she did praised the appearance of Paul Blackthrone as Quentin Lance. In a review for the Legends of Tomorrow episode "Meet the Legends", Shoemaker cited "Emerald Archer" as an example of a poorly done mockumentary.
