= Sea Shimooka =

American actress

- Born: February 27, 1995 (age 31); San Francisco, California
- Occupation: Actress
- Years active: 2015–present

Sea Shimooka is an American actress. She is best known for playing Emiko Queen in The CW superhero series Arrow and Sophon in the Netflix drama series 3 Body Problem.

== Early life ==
Shimooka was born in San Francisco, California on February 27, 1995. She played volleyball in high school. She graduated from the New York University Tisch School of the Arts in 2016 with a degree in Drama. She is of Japanese, Native Hawaiian, French, and English descent.

== Career ==
Her first big role came playing the Emiko Queen in The CW superhero series Arrow. She played Jenn Lamonde in the drama series Rescue: HI-Surf. She had a recurring role on the sci-fi series 3 Body Problem portraying Sophon, an AI created by the Santi. She made her directorial debut shooting the short film Berlin in Germany.

== Filmography ==
=== Film ===
| Year | Title | Role | Notes |
|---|---|---|---|
| 2020 | Pink Skies Ahead | Jen | |
| 2023 | BITTERS: Suicide Butterflies | Makeup Artist | Short |
| 2023 | BERLIN | Sara | Short |

=== Television ===
| Year | Title | Role | Notes |
|---|---|---|---|
| 2017 | Bull | Golfer | Episode; Make Me |
| 2018-2020 | Arrow | Emiko Queen | 18 episodes |
| 2020 | MacGyver | Kai | Episode; Code + Artemis + Nuclear + N3mesis |
| 2024-2026 | 3 Body Problem | Sophon | 8 episodes |
| 2024-2025 | Rescue: HI-Surf | Jenn Lamonde | 8 episodes |
