= Arrow (TV series) =

2012 American action-adventure television series

- Title card for the first season
- Genre: Action; Crime; Drama; Mystery; Superhero
- Based on: Characters by DC Comics
- Developed by: Greg Berlanti; Marc Guggenheim; Andrew Kreisberg
- Showrunners: Greg Berlanti; Marc Guggenheim; Andrew Kreisberg; Wendy Mericle; Beth Schwartz
- Starring: Stephen Amell; Katie Cassidy; Colin Donnell; David Ramsey; Willa Holland; Susanna Thompson; Paul Blackthorne; Emily Bett Rickards; Colton Haynes; Manu Bennett; John Barrowman; Echo Kellum; Josh Segarra; Rick Gonzalez; Juliana Harkavy; Kirk Acevedo; Sea Shimooka; Katherine McNamara; Ben Lewis; Joseph David-Jones; LaMonica Garrett
- Composer: Blake Neely
- Country of origin: United States
- Original language: English
- No. of seasons: 8
- No. of episodes: 170 (list of episodes)

Production
- Executive producers: David Nutter; Sarah Schechter; Wendy Mericle; Andrew Kreisberg; Marc Guggenheim; Greg Berlanti; Beth Schwartz; Jill Blankenship
- Producers: J. P. Finn; Wendy Mericle; Todd Pittson; Ben Sokolowski; Keto Shimizu; Glen Winter; James Bamford; Jon Wallace; Jennifer Lence; Oscar Balderrama; Carl Ogawa
- Production locations: Vancouver, British Columbia, Canada
- Cinematography: Glen Winter; Gordon Verheul; Gregory Middleton; C. Kim Miles; Corey Robson; Bruce Worrall; Chris Banting; Neil Cervin
- Editors: Kristin Windell; Andi Armaganian; Patrick Brian; Paul Karasik; Jessie Murray; Thomas Wallerstein; Carol Slutz; David Holland
- Camera setup: Single-camera
- Running time: 40–43 minutes
- Production companies: Berlanti Productions; DC Entertainment; Bonanza Productions; Warner Bros. Television

Original release
- Network: The CW
- Release: October 10, 2012 – January 28, 2020

Related
- Arrowverse

Arrow is an American superhero television series developed by Greg Berlanti, Marc Guggenheim, and Andrew Kreisberg based on the DC Comics character Green Arrow. It is the first series of the Arrowverse, sharing continuity with other related television series. The series premiered in the United States on The CW on October 10, 2012, and ran for eight seasons until January 28, 2020. Arrow was primarily filmed in Vancouver, British Columbia, Canada.

Arrow follows billionaire playboy Oliver Queen (Stephen Amell), Robert and Moira Queen's oldest son, who claimed to have spent five years shipwrecked on Lian Yu, a mysterious island in the North China Sea, before returning home to Starling City (later renamed "Star City") to fight crime and corruption as a secret vigilante whose weapon of choice is a bow and arrow. Throughout the series, Oliver is joined by others, among them former soldier John Diggle (David Ramsey), IT expert and skilled hacker Felicity Smoak (Emily Bett Rickards), former assassin Sara Lance (Caity Lotz), aspiring vigilante Roy Harper (Colton Haynes), Oliver's sister Thea (Willa Holland), and attorney-turned-vigilante Laurel Lance (Katie Cassidy). During the first five seasons of the show, characters from Oliver's past appear in a separate story arc based on Oliver's flashbacks. Starting with season seven, a series of flash-forwards focus on Oliver's children William (Ben Lewis) and Mia (Katherine McNamara), exploring how present events would affect their future and Green Arrow's legacy.

The series takes a new look at the Green Arrow character, as well as other characters from the DC Comics universe. Although Oliver Queen / Green Arrow had been featured in the television series Smallville from 2006 to 2011, also on The CW, the producers decided to start clean and find a new actor to portray the character. Arrow has received generally positive reviews from critics, and has earned multiple awards and nominations. In October 2014, a spin-off TV series titled The Flash premiered, which was later followed by other spin-off series and media, forming a shared universe.

== Series overview ==
The series follows billionaire playboy Oliver Queen, who spent five years shipwrecked on the mysterious island Lian Yu, before returning home to Starling City.

In season one, Oliver returns to Starling City and is reunited with his family and friends, including Tommy Merlyn and Laurel Lance. By night, he acts as a vigilante, known as "The Hood", hunting down those listed in his father's notebook, with assistance from John Diggle and Felicity Smoak. A conspiracy known as "The Undertaking", led by Malcolm Merlyn, threatens the city. The season also features flashbacks to Oliver's first year on the island, and his struggle to survive, alongside both new allies, including Slade Wilson, and foes.

In season two, following the death of Tommy Merlyn, Oliver vows to no longer kill. Operating under a new alias, "The Arrow", he is tested when the city comes under attack from Slade. He also struggles to balance his vigilante activities alongside his role as CEO of Queen Consolidated. The season sees the return of Sara Lance, now also known as "The Canary", as well as the introduction of government agency A.R.G.U.S and its leader Amanda Waller. The flashbacks see Oliver face a new threat on Lian Yu, as well as revealing the origins of his feud with Slade.

In season three, following Sara's murder and the loss of his family's company to Ray Palmer, Oliver refuses to believe he can lead a normal life whilst continuing as The Arrow. He becomes embroiled in a conflict with Ra's al Ghul to protect his sister Thea. Felicity becomes vice-president of the now renamed Palmer Technologies and Laurel sets out to follow in Sara's footsteps, assuming the mantle of Black Canary. The season's flashbacks see Oliver escape Lian Yu, only to be forced to work with Waller in Hong Kong, attempting to stop the release of a lethal pathogen.

In season four, Oliver and Felicity are living in Ivy Town, but return to the renamed Star City, to fight terrorist group H.I.V.E., led by Damien Darhk. Oliver adopts the moniker "Green Arrow" whilst also running for mayor. The discovery of the existence of his son William, and his decision to conceal the truth, leads to the breakup of his relationship with Felicity. Laurel is killed by Darhk, and Oliver discovers his plan to detonate nuclear weapons. The season's flashbacks see Oliver returned to Lian Yu by Waller, where he attempts to infiltrate the criminal group Shadowspire.

In season five, Oliver and Felicity recruit a new team of vigilantes to aid their mission, including former police detective Dinah Drake, as the new Black Canary. Oliver struggles to adjust to his break-up with Felicity, alongside trying to balance his new role as mayor with the threat posed by the serial killer Prometheus. The season also sees the introduction of an antagonistic version of Laurel Lance, known as Black Siren, a doppelganger from Earth-2, who made her debut during the second season of The Flash. In the season's flashbacks, Oliver travels to Russia where he joins the Bratva, and is trained by Talia al Ghul, before returning to Lian Yu.

In season six, Oliver attempts to balance his vigilantism alongside his role as mayor, whilst also being a father to William, following the death of the boy's mother. He rekindles his relationship with Felicity, with the pair marrying in the season's Arrowverse crossover. A new threat in the form of terrorist hacker Cayden James and his criminal gang emerges. When Ricardo Diaz kills James, and with team Arrow facing a bitter split, Oliver is forced to enlist the aid of the FBI, striking a deal that leads to his incarceration in federal prison and his outing as Green Arrow to the public.

In season seven, Felicity seeks new allies to help catch Diaz and release Oliver from prison. Following his defeat of Diaz and his prison release, Oliver and his team are deputized by the SCPD. His half-sister, Emiko Queen, emerges as the new Green Arrow; however, it is later revealed she is the leader of the terrorist group the Ninth Circle. The season features flash-forwards to twenty years into the future, with the now-adult William receiving a mysterious message. Joining Oliver's former allies, he discovers his half-sister, Oliver and Felicity's daughter Mia, and works to save the city from a cyber attack.

In the eighth and final season, the Monitor recruits Oliver to aid him in his mission to prevent the coming Crisis. William, Connor Hawke, and Mia mysteriously time travel from 2040 to present-day Star City. During the Crisis, Oliver sacrifices himself and becomes the Spectre to stop the Anti-Monitor. Following their final battle, a new multiverse is born at the cost of Oliver's life. He is then reunited with Felicity in a "paradise dimension", in the final scene of the series.

== Episodes ==
Arrow series overview
Season	Episodes	Originally released		Rank	Average viewers (in millions)
Season	Episodes	First released	Last released	Rank	Average viewers (in millions)
1	23	October 10, 2012	May 15, 2013	147	3.68
2	23	October 9, 2013	May 14, 2014	181	3.28
3	23	October 8, 2014	May 13, 2015	120	3.52
4	23	October 7, 2015	May 25, 2016	145	2.90
5	23	October 5, 2016	May 24, 2017	128	2.21
6	23	October 12, 2017	May 17, 2018	119	1.76
7	22	October 15, 2018	May 13, 2019	125	1.58
8	10	October 15, 2019	January 28, 2020	172	1.52

== Cast and characters ==
- Stephen Amell as Oliver Queen / Arrow / Green Arrow, a billionaire playboy turned hooded vigilante-hero who is initially known as the "Hood", "Vigilante", and simply "Arrow". He is based on the DC Comics character Green Arrow. He survives on an isolated island for five years after the sinking of his father's yacht. Oliver returns to his home city with a mission—to right the wrongs of his father and save the city from the crime that has grown in his absence. Amell was one of the first actors to audition for the role, and Kreisberg felt that he "hit the target from the outset" and "everyone else just paled in comparison". In season six's finale, Oliver confesses he's the Green Arrow and is sent to prison where he's known as "Inmate 4587". The actor, who was already in shape from Rent-a-Goalie, did physical fitness training at Tempest Freerunning Academy in Reseda, California. Amell received archery training as well, which included watching a video on how archery has been displayed inaccurately or poorly in television and film before learning the basics of shooting a bow. For Amell, the appeal of portraying Queen was that he saw multiple roles tied to the same character: "There's Queen the casual playboy; Queen the wounded hero; Queen the brooding Hamlet; Queen the lover; Queen the man of action, and so on". Amell also portrays Dark Arrow (Oliver's Earth-X doppelganger) in the sixth season's crossover "Crisis on Earth-X".
- Katie Cassidy as Laurel Lance / Black Canary (seasons 1–4; guest: season 5–8) and Laurel Lance / Black Siren / Black Canary (seasons 6–8; (Note: Although Cassidy is billed as a "special appearance" in season 8, she is still considered a series regular for the season.) recurring: season 5), based on the DC Comics character of the same name, an attorney turned vigilante and former girlfriend of Oliver Queen. Cassidy said she was drawn to the show by Berlanti, Nutter, Kreisberg, and Guggenheim, whom she called smart, creative, and edgy. She was the first primary character to be cast. Cassidy sees her character as a "caregiver" to her family, which led her to become an attorney. She said, "I think that she's very, very driven, and she has a huge heart ... she's sensitive. She has really strong morals and values, and she expects everybody to live up to them the way that she does". The Earth-1 version of the character dies near the end of season four, but Cassidy returned as a series regular from season six onward as the Earth-2 version of the character who first appeared in the spin-off show The Flash.
- Colin Donnell as Tommy Merlyn (season 1; recurring: seasons 7–8; guest: seasons 2–3 and 6), Oliver's best friend, the son of Malcolm Merlyn and boyfriend to Laurel Lance. His character dies in season one's finale but Donnell reprises his role as hallucinations and flashbacks in subsequent seasons and also portrays his Earth-X doppelganger Prometheus and a posthumous impersonation by Human Target in season six. Donnell returns in the eighth and final season as Merlyn's Earth-2 doppelgänger and is brought back to life by Oliver when he restored the multiverse in the "Crisis on Infinite Earths" crossover event.
- David Ramsey as John Diggle / Spartan, Oliver's partner, confidant, and bodyguard, who becomes part of their vigilante team. Named after comic book writer Andy Diggle, and created specifically for the show, Diggle was designed to be Oliver's "equal in many respects". Guggenheim further explained that Diggle's mutual abilities are a means of setting him up early in the series as a confidant for Oliver's vigilante persona.
- Willa Holland as Thea Queen / Speedy (seasons 1–6; recurring: season 8; guest: season 7), Oliver's younger half-sister; based on a DC Comics character with similar traits. The character is later revealed to be the daughter of Malcolm Merlyn. Holland exited the series in season six. Guggenheim stated that the door is always open for Holland to reprise her role as Thea. After departing the series in the sixth season, Holland returned in a special guest star role during season seven. Melissa Benoist had auditioned to portray Thea but was ultimately cast as Supergirl instead.
- Susanna Thompson as Moira Queen (seasons 1–2; guest: seasons 5 & 8), Oliver and Thea's mother. She is murdered at the end of season two, but was brought back by Oliver after he restored the multiverse.
- Paul Blackthorne as Quentin Lance (seasons 1–6; recurring: season 8; guest: season 7), Laurel and Sara Lance's father and Starling City police detective. The character is partly based on the DC Comics character Larry Lance. The character dies in the sixth-season finale, but his death is averted after Oliver restored the multiverse.
- Emily Bett Rickards as Felicity Smoak / Overwatch (seasons 2–7; recurring: season 1; guest: season 8), an IT technician at Queen Consolidated who later becomes part of Oliver's vigilante team, adopting the codename 'Overwatch'. She is loosely based on the character of the same name from the comic series Firestorm. The character goes on to develop a romantic relationship with Oliver, with the pair marrying during the "Crisis on Earth-X" crossover event. She becomes stepmother to Oliver's son, William, and mother to their daughter Mia. During season four she worked as CEO of Palmer Tech, and in season seven founded her own company, Smoak Technologies. Rickards was initially cast as a one-off guest star but was promoted to a series regular for season two, after becoming a recurring character throughout season one. Describing the character's personality, Rickards stated "Felicity is really focused, and I think that focus can be overpowering. The whole bubbly/awkward thing is a product of the focus. I don't think they're parts on their own." In March 2019, Rickards announced she would be leaving the series ahead of its final season. She returned as a special guest star for the series finale.
- Colton Haynes as Roy Harper / Arsenal (seasons 2–3 and 7; recurring: seasons 1 & 8; guest: seasons 4 & 6), a character based on the DC Comics character of the same name. He is also Thea Queen's romantic partner. Haynes was moved to series regular status at the beginning of season two, following his recurring appearance in season one. Haynes left the series after season three when his contract ended, and later appears as a guest star in the fourth, sixth, and eighth seasons (attributing his departure from to his mental and physical health at that time), but returned as a regular for season seven.
- Manu Bennett as Slade Wilson / Deathstroke (season 2; recurring: season 1; guest: seasons 3 & 5–6), Oliver's former mentor on Lian Yu who becomes a masked mercenary. He is based on the DC Comics character of the same name. Bennett was initially cast as a recurring character for season one, before receiving series regular status during season two.
- John Barrowman as Malcolm Merlyn / Dark Archer (seasons 3–4; recurring: seasons 1–2; guest: seasons 5–8), a wealthy businessman, the father of Tommy and Thea, and Oliver's nemesis. He is based on the DC Comics character Merlyn. After being a recurring guest star for the first two seasons, Barrowman became a series regular in season three. Barrowman reprised the role in season five during the crossover event "Invasion!" and later with his character's apparent death occurring off-screen, and again in season seven's crossover "Elseworlds" as a hallucination.
- Echo Kellum as Curtis Holt / Mister Terrific (seasons 5–7; recurring: season 4; guest: season 8), based on the DC Comics character of the same name. Holt is a technological savant, inventor and medal-winning Olympic decathlete, who works with Felicity at Palmer Technologies. Kellum was upgraded to series regular in the fifth season. Kellum exited the series during season seven, but returned for the finale and later appears as a guest star in season eight.
- Josh Segarra as Adrian Chase / Prometheus (season 5; guest: seasons 6 & 8), Star City's new district attorney, who is later revealed to be season five's antagonist and a serial killer bent on seeking revenge against Oliver. He is based on the DC Comics characters Adrian Chase and Prometheus.
- Rick Gonzalez as Rene Ramirez / Wild Dog (seasons 6–8; recurring: season 5), a dishonorably discharged Marine with an estranged daughter who joins Oliver's vigilante team. He is based on the DC Comics character of the same name. Gonzalez was promoted to series regular from season six.
- Juliana Harkavy as Dinah Drake / Black Canary (seasons 6–8; recurring: season 5), an undercover detective in Central City who later joins Oliver's team, taking on the Black Canary mantle. Harkavy was promoted to series regular from season six.
- Kirk Acevedo as Ricardo Diaz (season 7; recurring: season 6), a drug lord recently released from incarceration who terrorizes Star City, and targets Oliver. Acevedo was promoted to series regular for season seven.
- Sea Shimooka as Emiko Queen / Green Arrow (season 7; guest: season 8), Oliver's paternal half-sister and a vigilante who takes over the Green Arrow mantle after Oliver's imprisonment.
- Katherine McNamara as Mia Smoak / Blackstar / Mia Queen / Green Arrow (season 8; recurring: season 7), Oliver and Felicity's daughter in the flash-forwards set in the 2040s. McNamara was promoted to series regular for season eight.
- Ben Lewis as an adult William Clayton (season 8; recurring: season 7), Oliver and Samantha Clayton's son in the flash-forwards set in the 2040s. Lewis was promoted to series regular for season eight.
- Joseph David-Jones as an adult Connor Hawke (season 8; recurring: season 7), Ben Turner's biological son, Diggle's adopted son and an agent of Knightwatch in the flash-forwards set in the 2040s. David-Jones was promoted to series regular for season eight. Jones previously appeared in Legends of Tomorrow as John Diggle Jr. / Connor Hawke.
- LaMonica Garrett as Mar Novu / The Monitor (season 8; guest: season 7), a multiversal being testing different Earths in the multiverse in preparation for an impending "crisis". He made his first appearance in the Arrowverse crossover "Elseworlds".
  - Garrett also portrays Mobius / Anti-Monitor, the Monitor's polar opposite, an evil being dedicated to ending the multiverse.

== Production ==
=== Development ===
The idea for a Green Arrow TV series was first discussed during the sixth season of Smallville, with talk of spinning off Justin Hartley's portrayal of the character into his own series. Hartley however refused to entertain the idea, feeling it was his duty to respect what Smallville had accomplished in five seasons, and not "steal the spotlight" because there was "talk" of a spin-off after his two appearances. According to Hartley, "talking" was as far as the spin-off idea ever got. A spin-off series in which Oliver led the Justice League made it into early development. The series was to have been helmed by Stephen S. DeKnight, who would later go on to be the showrunner for the first season of Marvel's Daredevil.

In January 2012, following Smallville's conclusion, The CW prepared a new series centered around the character Green Arrow. Andrew Kreisberg, Greg Berlanti and Marc Guggenheim were announced to be developing the series. A week later, the series was ordered to pilot with David Nutter signed to direct. Nutter also directed the pilot for Smallville, the aforementioned series following Clark Kent on his journey to become Superman. When developing the series, producer Marc Guggenheim expressed that the creative team wanted to "chart [their] own course, [their] own destiny", and avoid any direct connections to Smallville. Thus rather than continuing on with Hartley's incarnation of the character, they opted to cast a new actor in the role and establish the series as its own separate continuity. At the end of the same month, Stephen Amell was cast in the titular role of Oliver Queen.

The series does not initially feature super-powered heroes and villains. This decision was, in part, based on the executives' desire to take a realistic look at the characters in this universe. Production on the pilot began in March 2012 in Vancouver, which would continue to act as the primary filming location for the series. The series' skyline shots use a combination of footage from Frankfurt, Germany, Center City, Philadelphia, Baltimore, Maryland, Back Bay, Boston, and Tokyo, Japan. The series was given a full season pick up on October 22, 2012.

I think the idea is to—not all the time, and not with a set regularity—but I think it is critical to explore how he went from the person that he was when he left the island—which is extremely different: he's spoiled, he's entitled, he's a bit of a jerk—and he comes off it something very, very different. So we're going to explore how he gets there.

— Stephen Amell on the use of flashback storytelling.

For the first five seasons Arrow features two storylines: one in the present, and the other, shown in flashback, during Oliver's time on the island five years before his rescue. These flashbacks are used to illustrate how Oliver transformed into the man that returns to Starling City. Filming for the island flashbacks takes place in Vancouver's Whytecliff Park area, near beachfront homes. Much planning is required to keep the buildings out of camera frame. Guggenheim said, "Stephen [Amell] has to wear a wig, and his look has to be changed ... there's a lot. It's actually incredibly ambitious to do these flashbacks every week, every single episode. Because like Andrew [Kreisberg] said, it's almost like it's its own show." Regarding the flashbacks after the fifth season, Guggenheim and Mericle stated that the series would explore flashbacks from other character's perspectives, such as Curtis Holt, along with the possibility of flashforwards. Guggenheim said, "We still want to make [flashbacks] part of our storytelling, because we do like them. We like it when those non-island flashbacks sort of illuminate what's going on in the present day. That'll always be a part of the show and a part of the show's storytelling structure. It just won't be telling a serialized story."

The series develops relationship triangles: some love triangles, others designed to catch characters in "philosophical debates". Kreisberg provides one such example: "Every week, Oliver will be facing a bad guy, but the truth is, his real nemesis is Detective Lance, who's trying to bring him into justice... His daughter is going to be caught in the middle, because she loves and respects her father, and she's always believed in what he believed, but at the same time, she's going to see this dark urban legend out there that's actually doing a lot of good; the kind of good that she wants to be doing in her role as a legal aid attorney." Learning from previous experiences working in television, the producers worked early on identifying the major story arcs for the series, specifically the first season, including "mapping out" how to accomplish them. Taking inspiration from Christopher Nolan's Batman film series, the creative team decided to "put it all out there" and "not hold back" from episode to episode.

The team strives to include various DC Comics characters and aspects of the DC universe. Guggenheim cited Big Belly Burger, a restaurant franchise introduced in the Superman comics, which appears in Arrow's third episode and onward. Kreisberg said, "There are so many characters in the DC Universe who haven't gotten their due in TV and film. We're so excited to reach into [the DC comics] roster and take some of these lesser-known characters that are beloved by fans, and do our spin on the characters."

Ahead of the 100th episode, Guggenheim talked about the commitment to quality the series strives for, stating, "We never skimped on the writing, the production or in the post-process going, 'This is going to be one of those stinkers, we might as well cut our losses and move on.' We worked as hard as we possibly can on the scripts. If episodes have come in bad, we reshoot ... Even in season 5, we have no problems with doing reshoots, or pickups, or anything we need to do to make each episode as successful as it can possibly be." He also noted his biggest regret in the series was "I wish we had allowed the Oliver-Felicity storyline in season 4 to unfold at a more natural pace. We had set these tentpoles at the beginning of the season, and we were a bit too rigorous on how we hit them. That was a case where the planning overtook the storytelling. We didn't do things as naturally and as elegantly as we should have."

On January 31, 2019, The CW renewed the series for an eighth season. On March 6, 2019, it was announced that the eighth season would be the final season of the series, with an abbreviated ten-episode run. Stephen Amell had approached Greg Berlanti towards the end of the sixth season about "mov[ing] on" following the expiration of his contract at the end of the seventh season. Amell had hoped that the show could go on without him, but Berlanti, Mark Guggenheim and Beth Schwartz decided to conclude the series with a shortened eighth season, which Amell agreed to. The season premiered on October 15, 2019, and concluded on January 28, 2020.

=== Costume Design ===
The Arrow costume, worn by Stephen Amell, during the first season

The realistic approach to the series included the costume design for Oliver's vigilante persona, created by Colleen Atwood. According to Amell, it was important for the suit to be functional, and the best way that he knew for that was if he could put the costume on by himself: "If I can put it on by myself, I think that people will buy it. And that was our idea. That's our world."

In the second half of season two, Oliver dons a domino mask, similar to one worn by the character in the comics. Kreisberg said of the mask, "It's actually a big plot point in an episode, and there really is a story behind, not only the need for the mask but also who provides him with it." On adding the mask now, Kreisberg stated that, "Conceptually, it was something we wanted to do because Oliver himself is [...] stepping out of the dark and being more of a symbol, so he has to take steps to conceal his identity more." He added that it will "allow the Arrow to interact with people who don't know his identity in a much more organic way than having him constantly keep his head down."

Costume designer Maya Mani put together roughly 50 mask options for the producers. Kreisberg said, "What's so wonderful about the design that Maya came up with is that it really is very simple, and it feels as if it's been part of his costume since the beginning ... once we finally had this mask and put it on Stephen [Amell], even Stephen was like, 'This is the right one.'" In the episode "Three Ghosts", Oliver receives the mask from Barry Allen, who is able to create a mask that will help conceal his identity, while still being functional and allowing Oliver to see clearly.

=== Music ===
To compose the score for Arrow, executive producer Greg Berlanti invited Blake Neely, with whom he had first worked on Everwood. Neely created a score that combined electronic and orchestral cues, varying between action themes and romantic ones. Berlanti told Neely the series would be dark, and the music should be as well. After reading the pilot script, Neely went away to start composing on his own. According to Neely, "Of course, Oliver has his main theme but also sub-themes for the many layers of his character. He and Laurel have a love theme. Mom had a theme for the Undertaking. The bad guys all have themes, which makes it sad for me when one of them dies. So I try not to become attached to bad-guy themes. Diggle has a theme. Even the Island itself has a theme." A soundtrack for season one was released on September 17, 2013, by WaterTower Music. Two versions of a soundtrack for season two were released on September 16, 2014, by WaterTower Music and La-La Land Records; the compact disc release includes two exclusive tracks not available on the digital release. On December 18, 2014, WaterTower Music and La La Records released a selection of music from The Flash / Arrow crossover episodes, as well as two bonus tracks from their respective 2014 midseason finales. The Season 3 soundtrack was released in December 2015, consisting of 2 discs for the first time (previous albums consisted of one CD).

== Release ==
=== Broadcast ===
Arrow premiered on The CW network from October 10, 2012, during the 2012–13 television season. In Canada, the show is broadcast simultaneously on the same day as the United States. The show premiered outside North America throughout the United Kingdom and Ireland, on October 22, 2012. In Australia, the series premiered on May 1, 2013, on the Nine Network, before moving to Foxtel for Season 4.

=== Home media ===
Each season release contains additional features, which include: making-of featurettes, episode commentaries, deleted scenes, gag reels, Comic-Con panels, and highlights from the Paley Fest. Starting with season four and continuing through each subsequent season, the boxsets included the crossover episodes from other connected series, as well as commentary on those episodes.

== Reception ==
=== Critical response ===
Critical response of Arrow
Season	Rotten Tomatoes	Metacritic
1	85% (285 reviews)	73 (25 reviews)
2	95% (266 reviews)	—N/a
3	89% (365 reviews)	—N/a
4	85% (369 reviews)	—N/a
5	88% (193 reviews)	—N/a
6	64% (186 reviews)	—N/a
7	88% (213 reviews)	—N/a
8	95% (125 reviews)	—N/a

The first season received favorable reviews, with a Metacritic score of 73 out of 100, based on reviews from 25 critics, making it the highest rated CW show in five years. Review aggregation website Rotten Tomatoes calculated an approval rating of 85%, based on 36 reviews, with an average rating of 7.47/10. The site's consensus reads, "The CW nails the target with Arrow, a comic book-inspired series that benefits from cinematic action sequences, strong plotting, and intriguing characters." Mary McNamara of the Los Angeles Times called the series an interesting setup with a quality look, describing Amell as "a poster boy (no doubt literally) for the Katniss Everdeen set." Brian Lowry at Variety described the series as a "handsome but stiff surrogate for Batman that could benefit from sharper execution." In reviewing the final episode of season one, Alasdair Wilkins of The A.V. Club gave the season as a whole a rating of B+, noting that the show "hasn't quite figured everything out yet, but it's had some standout episodes."

The second season received acclaim from critics for the action sequences, storytelling, performances of the cast, drama, and the portrayal of Slade Wilson. Rotten Tomatoes reported a 95% approval rating based on 12 reviews, with an average rating of 8.15/10. The site's consensus reads, "The second season of Arrow boasts more fantastic action, as well as a widening cast of intriguing, richly written characters." Jeff Jensen of Entertainment Weekly gave the first half of season two a rating of B+, saying, "Arrow possesses an intelligence that shines through its TV-budget production values, which aren't too shabby. The writing is adult and witty, the action is exciting, and Amell holds the center with well-cultivated ease." The A.V. Club's Carrie Raisler gave the first half of season two a rating of A−. She said, "Arrow [has] officially established itself as one of the most satisfying shows on television. The most satisfying thing of all is that it did so by respecting its characters ... [Arrow respects] the character's comic-book roots in its overarching plotlines, all while using the network-appropriate soap-opera stories to do the heavy character lifting."

Despite receiving positive responses for the season three premiere, the second half of the season was met with criticism. The flashback sequences were characterized as sporadic and "superfluous", with Ra's al Ghul described as a "shallow" and "underutilized" villain "absent of clear antagonism", although Matt Nable was generally praised for his portrayal of the character. Furthermore, while parallels to Batman had always existed in the show, the use of such a major character from Batman's rogues gallery and the essential application of the "Daughter of the Demon" and several other Batman and Ra's al Ghul storylines applied to Queen came under particular fire from viewers, who accused the show of "ripping off" Batman. The season finale was described as "dull", "lacking scope", and "underwhelming" by IGN's Jesse Schedeen in light of the "high standard" the show had previously established for its finales. He cemented the mixed reception of season three as being "haphazardly paced" and "struggling to develop a clear sense of direction". The third season holds a score of 89% on Rotten Tomatoes based on 9 reviews, with an average rating of 8.37/10. The site's consensus reads, "Arrow stays on target with new characters and a steady supply of exciting action."

The fourth season received mixed reviews. The season earned praise for the action scenes and Neal McDonough's performance as Damien Darhk. However, it also received increasingly negative reviews for its mundane flashbacks, lack of narrative focus, and formulaic season finale. Ryan Fleming of Deadbeatspanel.com noted that Arrow was "honoring the comics, but it isn't beholden to them. Characters ... have been introduced, but they aren't exact replicas of their comic counterparts. Instead, the characters tend to be loosely connected." Lesley Goldberg of The Hollywood Reporter noted the presence of the character Thea "Speedy" Queen as one of the larger departures from the comics in the series, as well as the character's early willingness to kill. Comic Book Resources' Kevin Melrose has also noted the series tendency to have loose connections to the source material. Rotten Tomatoes gave the season an 85% approval rating based on 10 reviews, with an average rating of 7.55/10. The critical consensus reads: "Season four of Arrow flourishes with a refreshing new tone, a thrilling new villain, and a gripping story arc."

The fifth season received mostly positive reviews from critics, with praise directed towards the performances of Amell and Josh Segarra, action sequences, storytelling, and the season finale. IGN gave the season a score of 8.7 out of 10, stating that it "managed to overcome them and recapture a lot of what made the show so memorable in its first two seasons." Rotten Tomatoes reported an approval rating of 88% based on 13 reviews, with an average rating of 7.38/10. The site's consensus reads, "No stranger to dramatic twists and turns, season five of Arrow continues to introduce new villains and surprise viewers despite some inconsistency".

The sixth season received mixed reviews from critics. IGN gave the season a score of 6.7 out of 10, stating that it "captured the show at its best and worst, with a strong finish redeeming months of disappointment." Rotten Tomatoes reported an approval rating of 64% based on 7 reviews, and the average score is 6.86/10. The site's consensus reads, "Arrow's sixth season deals with the literal fallout from the explosion in season five's finale and promises a drastic change in direction for the series".

The seventh season received more favorable reviews than the previous season. IGN gave the season a score of 7.4 out of 10, crediting Beth Schwartz's work with giving new life and energy to the show, while remarking that the season was "full of missed potential". Particular praise was given to Amell and Rickards' performances, as well as new directions for the show via "more willingness to take risks and venture off the beaten path this year, even if it often bit off more than it could chew with its large ensemble cast." Rotten Tomatoes reported an approval rating of 88% based on 211 reviews, with an average score of 7.35/10.

The eighth and final season was met with an approval rating of 95% on Rotten Tomatoes based on 125 reviews, with an average score of 7.5/10. The site's consensus reads, "Oliver Queen's final adventure hits emotional peaks while spearheading the game-changing 'Crisis on Infinite Earths', giving the Emerald Archer a rousing sendoff."

=== Ratings ===
Viewership and ratings per season of Arrow
Season	Timeslot (ET)	Episodes	First aired		Last aired		TV season	Viewership rank	Avg. viewers (millions)	18–49 rank	Avg. 18–49 rating
Season	Timeslot (ET)	Episodes	Date	Viewers (millions)	Date	Viewers (millions)	TV season	Viewership rank	Avg. viewers (millions)	18–49 rank	Avg. 18–49 rating
1	Wednesday 8:00 pm	23	October 10, 2012	4.14	May 15, 2013	2.77	2012–13	119	3.68	118	1.2
2	Wednesday 8:00 pm	23	October 9, 2013	2.74	May 14, 2014	2.37	2013–14	128	3.28	N/A	N/A
3	Wednesday 8:00 pm	23	October 8, 2014	2.83	May 13, 2015	2.83	2014–15	135	3.52	111	1.3
4	Wednesday 8:00 pm	23	October 7, 2015	2.67	May 25, 2016	2.19	2015–16	145	2.90	110	1.1
5	Wednesday 8:00 pm	23	October 5, 2016	1.87	May 24, 2017	1.72	2016–17	147	2.21	133	0.8
6	Thursday 9:00 pm (Note: For episode 8 ("Crisis on Earth-X Part 2"), the show was moved to Monday 9:00 pm to fit the chronology of the crossover.)	23	October 12, 2017	1.52	May 17, 2018	1.35	2017–18	181	1.76	155	0.6
7	Monday 8:00 pm (1–17); Monday 9:00 pm (18–22)	22	October 15, 2018	1.43	May 13, 2019	0.95	2018–19	172	1.58	147	0.5
8	Tuesday 9:00 pm (Note: For episode 8 ("Crisis on Infinite Earths: Part Four"), the show was moved to 8:00 pm on Tuesday, January 14, 2020, to fit the chronology of the crossover.)	10	October 15, 2019	0.84	January 28, 2020	0.73	2019–20	120	1.52	106	0.6

In the United States, Arrow's premiere episode drew 4.14 million viewers, making it The CW's most-watched telecast of any show on any night in three years, and The CW's most-watched series premiere since The Vampire Diaries in 2009. In its second episode, Arrow became the only new network drama in the 2012–13 season to hold its ratings in both adults 18–34 and adults 18–49 from its premiere to its second week. In Australia, the premiere received 1.32 million viewers, making it the third most-watched broadcast on the network that night. The UK broadcast was the highest-rated telecast of the week on Sky 1, with 1.85 million viewers. In Canada, the first episode got 1.32 million viewers, making it the fourth most-watched airing of the night and the twenty-third of the week.

=== Accolades ===
Awards and nominations received by Arrow
Year	Award	Category	Nominee(s)	Result	Ref.
2012	IGN Awards	Best TV Hero	Oliver Queen (Stephen Amell)	Nominated	
2012	Satellite Awards	Satellite Award for Best Television Series – Genre	Arrow	Nominated	
2013	Broadcast Music, Inc.	BMI Television Music Awards	Blake Neely	Won	
2013	Canadian Society of Cinematography Awards	TV Drama Cinematography	Glen Winter (for "Pilot")	Won	
2013	Canadian Society of Cinematography Awards	TV series Cinematography	Glen Winter (for "Vendetta")	Nominated	
2013	Leo Awards	Best Casting Dramatic Series	Coreen Mayrs, Heike Brandstatter (for "An Innocent Man")	Nominated	
2013	Leo Awards	Best Cinematography Dramatic Series	Gordon Verheul (for "Lone Gunmen")	Nominated	
2013	Leo Awards	Best Cinematography Dramatic Series	Glen Winter (for "Pilot")	Won	
2013	Leo Awards	Best Dramatic Series	Joseph Patrick Finn, Greg Berlanti, Marc Guggenheim, Andrew Kreisberg, Melissa Kellner Berman, Drew Greenberg, Jennifer Lence, Wendy Mericle, Carl Ogawa	Nominated	
2013	Leo Awards	Best Production Design Dramatic Series	Richard Hudolin (for "Pilot")	Won	
2013	Leo Awards	Best Stunt Coordination Dramatic Series	J. J. Makaro (for "Pilot")	Won	
2013	Leo Awards	Best Stunt Coordination Dramatic Series	J. J. Makaro (for "Vertigo")	Nominated	
2013	Leo Awards	Best Visual Effects Dramatic Series	Jean-Luc Dinsdale, Pauline Burns, Andrew Orloff, Dave Gauthier (for "Burned")	Won	
2013	NewNowNext Awards	Best New Indulgence	Arrow	Nominated	
2013	NewNowNext Awards	Cause You're Hot	Stephen Amell	Nominated	
2013	People's Choice Awards	Favorite New TV Drama	Arrow	Nominated	
2013	Saturn Awards	Best Youth-Oriented Series on Television	Arrow	Nominated	
2013	Teen Choice Awards	Choice Breakout TV Show	Arrow	Nominated	
2013	Teen Choice Awards	Choice Breakout TV Star	Stephen Amell	Nominated	
2013	Teen Choice Awards	Choice Sci-Fi/Fantasy TV Actor	Stephen Amell	Nominated	
2013	Teen Choice Awards	Choice Sci-Fi/Fantasy TV Actress	Katie Cassidy	Nominated	
2013	Teen Choice Awards	Choice Sci-Fi/Fantasy TV Show	Arrow	Nominated	
2013	UBCP/ACTRA Awards	Best Newcomer	Emily Bett Rickards	Nominated	
2014	Constellation Awards	Best Male Performance in a 2013 Science Fiction Television Episode	Stephen Amell (for "The Odyssey")	Nominated	
2014	Constellation Awards	Best Science Fiction Television Series of 2013	Arrow	Nominated	
2014	IGN Awards	Best TV Action Series	Arrow	Won	
2014	IGN Awards	Best TV Hero	Oliver Queen	People's Choice	
2014	Leo Awards	Best Cinematography Dramatic Series	Gordon Verheul (for "Sacrifice")	Nominated	
2014	Leo Awards	Best Dramatic Series	Greg Berlanti, Joseph P. Finn, Marc Guggenheim, Andrew Kreisberg, Wendy Mericle	Nominated	
2014	Leo Awards	Best Lead Performance by a Male Dramatic Series	Stephen Amell (for "Crucible")	Nominated	
2014	Leo Awards	Best Lead Performance by a Female Dramatic Series	Emily Bett Rickards (for "Three Ghosts")	Nominated	
2014	Leo Awards	Best Make-Up Dramatic Series	Danielle Fowler (for "Keep Your Enemies Closer")	Nominated	
2014	Leo Awards	Best Stunt Coordination Dramatic Series	J. J. Makaro (for "The Scientist")	Nominated	
2014	People's Choice Awards	Favorite Sci-Fi/Fantasy TV Actor	Stephen Amell	Nominated	
2014	Satellite Awards	Satellite Award for Best Television Series – Genre	Arrow	Nominated	
2014	Saturn Awards	Best Youth-Oriented Television Series	Arrow	Nominated	
2014	Teen Choice Awards	Choice Sci-Fi/Fantasy TV Show	Arrow	Nominated	
2014	Teen Choice Awards	Choice TV Female Breakout Star	Emily Bett Rickards	Nominated	
2014	Young Hollywood Awards	Super Superhero	Stephen Amell	Nominated	
2015	Leo Awards	Cinematography	C. Kim Miles (for "Blind Spot")	Nominated	
2015	Leo Awards	Costume Design	Maya Mani (for "Suicide Squad")	Nominated	
2015	Leo Awards	Lead Performance – Female	Emily Bett Rickards (for "Left Behind")	Nominated	
2015	MTV Fandom Awards	Ship of the Year	Stephen Amell & Emily Bett Rickards	Won	
2015	Saturn Awards	Best Superhero Adaptation Television Series	Arrow	Nominated	
2015	PRISM Awards	Performance in a Drama Multi-Episode Storyline	Katie Cassidy	Won	
2015	Teen Choice Awards	Choice TV Show: Sci-Fi/Fantasy	Arrow	Nominated	
2015	Teen Choice Awards	Choice TV Actor: Sci-Fi/Fantasy	Stephen Amell	Nominated	
2015	Teen Choice Awards	Choice TV Actress: Sci-Fi/Fantasy	Emily Bett Rickards	Nominated	
2015	Teen Choice Awards	Choice TV Liplock	Stephen Amell & Emily Bett Rickards	Nominated	
2015	Teen Choice Awards	Choice TV Villain	Matt Nable	Nominated	
2016	GLAAD Media Awards	Outstanding Drama Series	Arrow	Nominated	
2016	MTV Fandom Awards	Ship of the Year	Stephen Amell & Emily Bett Rickards	Won	
2016	People's Choice Awards	Favorite Network TV Sci-Fi/Fantasy	Arrow	Nominated	
2016	Saturn Awards	Best Superhero Adaptation Television Series	Arrow	Nominated	
2016	Teen Choice Awards	Choice TV: Liplock	Stephen Amell & Emily Bett Rickards	Nominated	
2016	Teen Choice Awards	Choice TV Actress: Fantasy/Sci-Fi	Emily Bett Rickards	Nominated	
2016	Teen Choice Awards	Choice TV Show: Fantasy/Sci-Fi	Arrow	Nominated	
2017	Leo Awards	Best Cinematography in a Dramatic Series	Shamus Whiting-Hewlett (for "Sins of the Father")	Nominated	
2017	Leo Awards	Best Lead Performance by a Female in a Dramatic Series	Emily Bett Rickards (for "Who Are You?")	Nominated	
2017	Leo Awards	Best Stunt Coordination in a Dramatic Series	Curtis Braconnier, Eli Zagoudakis (for "What We Leave Behind")	Won	
2017	MTV Movie & TV Awards	Best Hero	Stephen Amell	Nominated	
2017	People's Choice Awards	Favorite Network TV Sci-Fi/Fantasy	Arrow	Nominated	
2017	Saturn Awards	Best Superhero Adaptation Television Series	Arrow	Nominated	
2017	Teen Choice Awards	Choice TV Actor: Action	Stephen Amell	Nominated	
2017	Teen Choice Awards	Choice TV Actress: Action	Emily Bett Rickards	Nominated	
2017	Teen Choice Awards	Choice TV Show: Action	Arrow	Nominated	
2017	Teen Choice Awards	Choice TV Villain	Josh Segarra	Nominated	
2018	People's Choice Awards	The Sci-Fi/Fantasy Show of 2018	Arrow	Nominated	
2018	Saturn Awards	Best Superhero Adaptation Television Series	Arrow	Nominated	
2018	Teen Choice Awards	Choice TV Actor: Action	Stephen Amell	Nominated	
2018	Teen Choice Awards	Choice TV Actress: Action	Emily Bett Rickards	Nominated	
2018	Teen Choice Awards	Choice TV Ship	Stephen Amell & Emily Bett Rickards	Nominated	
2018	Teen Choice Awards	Choice TV Show: Action	Arrow	Nominated	
2019	Leo Awards	Best Stunt Coordination in a Dramatic Series	Jeff Robinson, Eli Zagoudakis (for "The Slabside Redemption")	Won	
2019	Saturn Awards	Best Superhero Television Series	Arrow	Nominated	
2019	Teen Choice Awards	Choice TV Show: Action	Arrow	Nominated	
2019	Teen Choice Awards	Choice TV Actor: Action	Stephen Amell	Won	
2019	Teen Choice Awards	Choice TV Actress: Action	Emily Bett Rickards	Nominated	

== Other media ==
Arrow has generated other media and spin-offs, including digital comic books and Internet-based mini-episodes with characters from the series.

=== Digital comics ===
==== Arrow (2012–13) ====
To promote the series, DC Comics produced a 10-page preview comic for the 2012 San Diego Comic-Con, written by Kreisberg, illustrated by Omar Francia, and featuring a cover by artist Mike Grell. The comic was regarded by the production crew as sharing the same canon as the series, with Kreisberg commenting, "[For] anyone who grabs a copy: Hold onto it and as the series progresses, you'll appreciate it more and more." It was later released free online. On October 10, 2012, DC Comics debuted a weekly digital comic tie-in written by Kreisberg and Guggenheim and drawn by various artists, including Mike Grell, which remained in continuity with the television series. The comics were to be released initially as digital chapters, and then later be collated to produce monthly print issues. The series lasted for 36 chapters, running until June 2013. These were collected, together with the initial preview comic, in two volumes with the first released digitally in October 2013 and the second in both print and digital formats in May 2014. Titan Magazines published the comics in a physical format in the UK. The first issue was published on October 17, 2013, and contained the first four chapters of the series, with the complete series lasting six issues.

==== Arrow: Season 2.5 (2014–15) ====
A follow-up to the original digital title, Arrow: Season 2.5, is written by Guggenheim and Keto Shimizu, one of the show's executive story editors and writers, with art by Joe Bennett and Jack Jadson. Arrow 2.5 is intended to tell one continuous story across two arcs, that fits within the television narrative. Guggenheim stated, "We've tried to put in all the elements that people like about the show ... We're going to see what's happened to Detective Lance after he collapsed in the season [two] finale. A good chunk of the burning questions left over will get answered in the tie-in comic. Particularly towards the latter half of the series, we're going to start introducing characters [in the comic] who you'll see in Season 3 ... before they show up on TV." On the comic's relationship to season three of the show, Guggenheim said, "Season three is designed to stand on its own feet without requiring anyone to do any outside reading. But what the comic book will give is a deeper appreciation for some of the moments [in the show] and a more complete narrative experience. If you want to go deeper into the story, that's what Season 2.5 is for." Shimizu added that the comic also allows the writers to "accomplish things on the page that are nearly impossible to do with our production schedule and our budget", including bigger action sequences, as well as visits to locations that cannot be recreated on the show. The character Caleb Green, who has ties to Robert Queen, was created specifically for the comic. Guggenheim said "The goal is to end Season 2.5 basically five minutes before Season 3 begins." The comic launched digitally biweekly on September 1, 2014, with its first physical release featuring a collection of the digital releases releasing on October 8. The series featured 24 digital issues, which constituted 12 physical issues.

==== Arrow: The Dark Archer (2016) ====
A third series, Arrow: The Dark Archer, is written by Barrowman with his sister Carole, and with an art team led by Daniel Sampere. The comic, initially set between seasons three and four of the show before flashing back, explores a younger Malcolm Merlyn and his past, with Corto Maltese and Nanda Parbat featured. Barrowman, who initially pitched the series to DC Comics as another with the ability to tell Merlyn's backstory, said he "had a backstory in my head for Malcolm from the beginning and a lot of it has made its way into our comic, and onto the screen. I think it's always been my job to help the audience relate to Malcolm in some way despite his questionable morals and evil ways." Executive producers Guggenheim and Kreisberg helped the Barrowmans ensure the story would fit within the continuity of the series. The 12-chapter series was released digitally once every two weeks starting January 13, 2016, before the entire story was collected in a single print edition in September 2016.

=== Blood Rush ===
On November 6, 2013, a six-episode series of shorts, titled Blood Rush, premiered alongside the broadcast of the show, as well as online. The series, which features product placement for products of its sponsor, Bose, was shot on location in Vancouver, similar to the main show. The miniseries features Emily Bett Rickards, Colton Haynes and Paul Blackthorne reprising their roles of Felicity Smoak, Roy Harper and Quentin Lance, respectively.

The episodes set during the course of the second season of the television series, show Roy coming to Queen Consolidated to have a meeting with Oliver. As he is out, Felicity tells Roy to go wait in the lobby. As Roy leaves, Officer Lance calls Felicity, telling her that the blood sample the Starling City police found on the vigilante, which Felicity destroyed, has resurfaced. Felicity then calls Roy, using Oliver's voice encoder, asking him to break into the lab to retrieve the sample. Felicity guides Roy through the lab, where he is able to recover the sample. As Roy is leaving, doctors enter the room, seemingly trapping him. He notifies Felicity, who then hacks into the building's PA system, and issues an evacuation notice, giving Roy a chance to escape. Roy gets out of the room before it enters into lock down, and is able to avoid two guards with the help of Felicity and exit the lab. Roy returns to Queen Consolidated, and Felicity offers to mail the acquired sample for Roy as he goes in to meet with Oliver.

=== Video games ===
A Green Arrow skin based on Oliver Queen's appearance in Arrow appears in the 2013 video game Injustice: Gods Among Us as downloadable content. The playable skin was given as a bonus reward to the first 5,000 voters of Injustice's promotional Battle Arena competition, but was later released as a free download. Stephen Amell lends his voice and likeness to the skin.

Lego Batman 3: Beyond Gotham features an Arrow downloadable content pack that adds multiple playable characters, including Arrow, John Diggle, Felicity Smoak, Huntress, Slade Wilson, Roy Harper, Canary, and Malcolm Merlyn as well as vehicles and an exclusive level set during Oliver's time in Lian Yu. Amell reprised his role in addition to voicing the traditional Green Arrow in the game, while Cynthia Addai-Robinson reprised her role as Amanda Waller.

The video game Lego DC Super-Villains features DLC inspired by Arrow in the "DC Super Heroes: TV Series DLC Character Pack". The DLC pack includes The Atom, Green Arrow, and Mister Terrific as playable characters.

=== Novels ===
On February 23, 2016, Titan Books released Arrow: Vengeance, a tie-in novelization written by Oscar Balderrama and Lauren Certo, which is set before and during the second season, detailing the origins of Slade Wilson, Sebastian Blood, and Isabel Rochev, and how they eventually meet and collaborate with each other to battle Oliver's alter-ego as seen in the television series. On November 29, 2016, Titan Books released The Flash: The Haunting of Barry Allen, a tie-in novelization written by Susan and Clay Griffith, set during the second season of The Flash and the fourth season of Arrow, which features characters from both shows; the story continued in Arrow: A Generation of Vipers, released on March 28, 2017, again written by the Griffiths.

In August 2017, it was confirmed that Arrow executive producer Marc Guggenheim would co-author a fourth novel, alongside James R. Tuck, entitled Arrow: Fatal Legacies, which was released in January 2018. The novel focuses on events between the fifth-season finale and sixth-season premiere.

=== Guidebooks ===
The first guidebook to be released was Arrow: Heroes and Villains by Nick Aires and published by Titan Books, released in February 2015. Described as "a companion" to the series, the book features sections on the various characters of the series, along with descriptions, backgrounds, comic book origins, and "where they stand as of the end of the second season of Arrow".

A follow-up to Heroes and Villains by the same author and publisher, titled Arrow: Oliver Queen's Dossier, was released in October 2016, during the series' fifth season. The book is presented as information collected by the Green Arrow and Felicity Smoak over the course of his four years of activity. Included in the book are "handwritten notes" and "police reports" regarding the Green Arrow and those he targets.

== Arrowverse ==
=== Spin-offs ===
In July 2013, it was announced that Berlanti and Kreisberg, along with Nutter and Geoff Johns, would be creating a television series, The Flash, based on the character of the same name, with an origin story for Barry Allen. The character, portrayed by Grant Gustin, was set to appear in three episodes of season two of Arrow, with the final one acting as a backdoor pilot for the new series. However, it was announced in November 2013 that the backdoor pilot would not be happening, with a traditional pilot being made instead. In January 2015, The CW president Mark Pedowitz announced the intention to do a Flash and Arrow crossover every season, and The CW announced that an animated web-series, Vixen, featuring the DC heroine of the same name and set in the universe of Arrow and The Flash, would be debuting on CW Seed in late 2015. The character later made a live-action appearance on Arrow in the fourth-season episode "Taken". The next month, it was reported that a spin-off series, which is described as a superhero team-up show, was in discussion by The CW for a possible 2015–16 midseason release. Berlanti and Kreisberg would executive produce alongside Guggenheim and Sarah Schechter. The potential series would be headlined by several recurring characters from both Arrow and The Flash, with the potential for other Arrow/Flash characters to cross over to the new series as well. In May 2015, The CW officially picked up the series, titled Legends of Tomorrow. A series titled Justice U that would star Ramsey was announced to be in development on January 13, 2022, however, it was passed on in May 2023.

Several characters from previous seasons returned in "Invasion!", a crossover episode with The Flash and Legends of Tomorrow (and features Kara Danvers / Supergirl from Supergirl) which also doubles as the 100th episode of Arrow, where Thea, Diggle, Sara, Ray and Oliver are abducted by the Dominators and were put in dream stasis to gather intel, while they are shown what their lives would have been had Oliver never gotten on the Queen's Gambit. Further crossovers occurred with "Crisis on Earth-X" in 2017, "Elseworlds" in 2018, and "Crisis on Infinite Earths" in late 2019 and early 2020.

=== Constantine ===
In August 2015, it was confirmed that Matt Ryan would appear in the fourth-season episode "Haunted", reprising his role as John Constantine from the short-lived NBC series Constantine per a "one-time-only-deal" that would involve his character being "brought in to deal with the fallout of the resurrection of Sara Lance (Caity Lotz) via Ra's al Ghul's Lazarus Pit." Due to Arrow and Constantine sharing the same studio, the producers of Arrow were also able to acquire Ryan's original outfits. John Badham, who was a director on Constantine, directed the crossover episode. On filming the episode, Guggenheim stated it felt like the production team was "doing a Constantine/Arrow crossover, and it's so exciting ... we're just really glad we got the chance to extend Matt Ryan's run as Constantine by at least one more hour of television. I think you'll see he fits very neatly into our universe. It never feels forced, it feels right." Ryan would later reprise his role as Constantine in Legends of Tomorrow, beginning with its third season as a recurring cast member before being promoted to series regular status for the fourth season.

=== Green Arrow and the Canaries ===
In August 2019, it was reported that another untitled spin-off was in development. The next month, The CW announced it was developing a female-led spin-off series, with Katherine McNamara, Katie Cassidy, and Juliana Harkavy as the leads, reprising their roles from Arrow. An episode of Arrow's final season would serve as a backdoor pilot for the potential series. Filming for the backdoor pilot began on October 21, 2019, with its title, along with the series, being named Green Arrow and the Canaries.

In May 2020, after the series was revealed not to have been picked up for the early part of The CW's 2020–21 television season, CW president Mark Pedowitz said the series was "very much alive" and remained under consideration. In June, Guggenheim said that, should the series not be picked up, he would potentially resolve the cliffhangers introduced in the backdoor pilot in a comic book. In January 2021, The CW officially passed on the spin-off; Guggenheim said this decision was made at the beginning of the COVID-19 pandemic, with Guggenheim feeling the pandemic was the "deciding factor" in not moving forward with the series. Having the series move to HBO Max was also reportedly "thoroughly explored", which was another contributing factor to the length of time it took to officially announce its cancellation.
