= Starling City (Arrow episode) =

- Arrow episode
- Episode no.: Season 8 Episode 1
- Directed by: James Bamford
- Written by: Marc Guggenheim; Beth Schwartz
- Cinematography by: Gordon Verheul
- Editing by: David Holland
- Original air date: October 15, 2019

Guest appearances
- Susanna Thompson as Moira Queen; John Barrowman as Malcolm Merlyn; Josh Segarra as Adrian Chase / The Hood; Andrea Sixtos as Zoe Ramirez; Charlie Barnett as John Diggle Jr.; Colin Donnell as Tommy Merlyn / Dark Archer

Episode chronology
← Previous "You Have Saved This City"	Next → "Welcome to Hong Kong"
- Arrow season 8

"Starling City" is the first episode of the eighth season of the American television series Arrow, based on the DC Comics character Green Arrow, revolving around billionaire playboy Oliver Queen as he returns to Starling City (later renamed Star City), after having been shipwrecked for five years, and becomes a bow-wielding, hooded vigilante who sets out to fight crime and corruption. It is set in the Arrowverse, sharing continuity with the other television series of the universe. The episode was written by showrunners Marc Guggenheim and Beth Schwartz, and directed by co-executive producer James Bamford.

Stephen Amell stars as Oliver, and is joined by principal cast members David Ramsey, Rick Gonzalez, Juliana Harkavy, Katherine McNamara, Ben Lewis, Joseph David-Jones, LaMonica Garrett and Katie Cassidy. The episode follows two storylines; in one, Oliver is sent to Earth-2 on a mission by Mar Novu / The Monitor. In the other, set in 2040, Mia Smoak and William Clayton's team face a new enemy.

"Starling City" first aired in the United States on The CW on October 15, 2019, and was watched live by 0.8 million viewers, with a 0.3/2 share among adults aged 18 to 49. The episode received generally positive reviews from critics.

== Plot ==
In 2019, Mar Novu / the Monitor sends Oliver Queen to Earth-2 to retrieve a rare element, Dwarf Star particles, which are only native to that Earth. Oliver arrives on Lian Yu and is taken to Starling City. He is greeted by the doppelgängers of his mother Moira, Malcolm Merlyn and Malcolm's son Tommy. Oliver steals Moira's key card to infiltrate Queen-Merlyn Enterprises as the Green Arrow, only to find out the particles were already stolen by the Dark Archer. He is then attacked by The Hood, who on this Earth is the doppelgänger of Adrian Chase, only to be saved by Laurel Lance who takes Oliver to her bunker. Oliver assumes the Dark Archer is Malcolm, whom he confronts, only to be attacked again by the Dark Archer, who is revealed to be Tommy.

The following day, sergeant Dinah Drake interrogates Oliver and his family about the incident, but is interrupted by Malcolm's bodyguard, Rene Ramirez. John Diggle of Earth-1 arrives on Earth-2 to seek out Oliver, who tells him he will die in the coming crisis. That night, Tommy kidnaps Oliver, who realizes he is planning to use the particles to level the Glades as retribution for taking the life of his Thea Queen, Oliver's sister, who died of an overdose. Oliver manages to escape with the help of Diggle and returns to Laurel's bunker, where he teams up with her and Adrian.

Oliver convinces Tommy to not commence his plan, but Tommy initially ignores him. After fighting each other, Tommy is convinced and turns himself in. The team returns to the bunker, where Adrian deduces that Oliver is from a parallel universe. Before Oliver and Diggle return to Earth-1, Earth-2 comes under attack. Laurel escapes with Oliver and Diggle before Starling City and the rest of Earth-2 is mysteriously vaporized. (Note: This begins the lead-up to the "Crisis on Infinite Earths" crossover.)

In 2040, Connor Hawke, Mia Smoak, William Clayton, and Zoe Ramirez encounter the Deathstroke Gang, led by Connor's adoptive brother John Diggle "J.J." Jr., who have grown more powerful since the destruction of the wall between Star City and the Glades.

== Production ==
=== Development ===
On July 11, 2019, it was announced that the season premiere of the eighth season of Arrow would be titled "Starling City". The episode was directed by James Bamford, and written by showrunners Marc Guggenheim and Beth Schwartz.

=== Writing ===
Marc Guggenheim said "Starling City" would be "like a remix of the pilot. It really revisits fun, key moments in the pilot", in addition to one of its scenes being a "throwback" to Oliver Queen's first meeting with Felicity Smoak in the first season. The episode's first few minutes, which show Oliver running on Earth-2's Lian Yu before being discovered by sailors and taken to this Earth's Starling City, emulate a similar scene from the pilot episode. The scene which Guggenheim said would be a "throwback" shows Oliver approaching a woman who he initially mistakes for this Earth's Felicity, at the offices of Queen-Merlyn Enterprises. Though many other scenes, such as Oliver uniting with the Earth-2 versions of his family are near-verbatim homages to the pilot, the denizens of Earth-2 differ from their Earth-1 counterparts in many ways. Among them, Moira Queen is married to Malcolm Merlyn instead of Walter Steele like her Earth-1 counterpart; Tommy Merlyn is the Dark Archer instead of Malcolm; Rene Ramirez and Dinah Drake are corrupt; and Adrian Chase is a vigilante known as the Hood. Chase's quote, "if you eliminate the impossible, whatever remains -- however improbable -- must be the truth" which he attributes to this Earth's Bruce Wayne, was originally created by Arthur Conan Doyle for his Sherlock Holmes stories. The episode ends with Earth-2 being vaporised by a wave of antimatter; the writers consulted with writers of The Flash regarding the destruction of Earth-2 to ensure they could destroy this Earth.

=== Casting ===
Main cast members Stephen Amell, David Ramsey, Rick Gonzalez, Juliana Harkavy, Katherine McNamara, Ben Lewis, Joseph David-Jones, LaMonica Garrett and Katie Cassidy appear as Oliver Queen / Green Arrow, John Diggle, Earth-2's Rene Ramirez and Dinah Drake, Mia Smoak, William Clayton, Connor Hawke, Mar Novu / Monitor and Earth-2's Laurel Lance / Black Canary. Despite the "special appearance" bill, Cassidy is still considered part of the main cast. The guest cast includes Susanna Thompson, John Barrowman and Josh Segarra as the Earth-2 versions of Moira Queen, Malcolm Merlyn and Adrian Chase. Additional guest stars include Andrea Sixtos as Zoe Ramirez, Charlie Barnett as John Diggle Jr., and Colin Donnell as the Earth-2 version of Tommy Merlyn. Tegan Verheul co-stars as the woman Oliver initially mistakes for Earth-2's Felicity Smoak, with her role being credited as "Not Felicity".

=== Filming ===
Preparation for the episode ran from July 2 until July 12, 2019. Filming began on July 11, the day of the title reveal, and ended on July 27.

== Reception ==
=== Ratings ===
"Starling City" was first aired in the United States on The CW on October 15, 2019. It was watched live by 0.8 million viewers with a 0.3/2 share among adults aged 18 to 49.

=== Critical response ===
The review aggregator website Rotten Tomatoes reported a 100% approval rating for the episode, based on 13 reviews, with an average rating of 8.89/10. The website's critical consensus reads, "Arrow kicks off its final season with a cosmic bang, harkening back to its origins and establishing the stakes of its dimensional conflict in emotional, rousing style."

Allison Shoemaker of The A.V. Club rated the episode B+, saying, "The whole thing works because Amell and Ramsey make it work—particularly Amell, who plays his hellos and goodbyes as though Oliver's heart might burst at any moment, were the stakes not so high. It works because the writers allow those winks and easter eggs to carry real emotional weight. And it works because it's a fittingly bittersweet place to start what's likely to be a bittersweet season." Delia Harrington of Den of Geek rated the episode five out of five stars, describing it as "fun-ass television" and "a tremendous step forwards". She complimented all the callbacks to season 1 and Stephen Amell's acting stating that he is "pumping more of his natural charm into the role than usual."

Jesse Schedeen of IGN rated the episode 8.7 out of 10, noting that the action scenes suffer as most of them are in dimly lit rooms and feature two identical archers fighting. Schedeen praised Amell's performance and the strong material he is given to work with. Chancellor Agard of Entertainment Weekly said, "Overall, I liked the premiere. The writers and stars promised it would be an ode to season 1, and it definitely succeeded in that respect. All the nods to the past were really fun and sweet". Laura Hurley of Cinema Blend said, "The end has begun for Arrow thanks to the premiere of the eighth and final season, and "Starling City" will go down as one of the most game-changing in the history of the entire Arrow-verse." Trent Moore of Syfy Wire said that Oliver "gets some much needed closure with his mother [...] That scene provided a true emotional tether to Oliver's mission this season, and it was great to see that character receive a final sendoff."
