= Leap of Faith (Arrow) =

- Arrow episode
- Episode no.: Season 8 Episode 3
- Directed by: Katie Cassidy
- Written by: Emilio Ortega Aldrich; Elizabeth Kim
- Cinematography by: Gordon Verheul
- Editing by: Iris Hershner
- Original air date: October 29, 2019

Guest appearances
- Willa Holland as Thea Queen; Audrey Marie Anderson as Lyla Michaels; Andrea Sixtos as adult Zoe Ramirez; Charlie Barnett as adult John Diggle Jr.; Lexa Doig as Talia al Ghul; Kyra Zagorsky as Athena

Episode chronology
← Previous "Welcome to Hong Kong"	Next → "Present Tense"
- Arrow season 8

"Leap of Faith" is the third episode of the eighth season of the American television series Arrow, based on the DC Comics character Green Arrow, revolving around billionaire playboy Oliver Queen as he returns to Starling City (later renamed Star City), after having been shipwrecked for five years, and becomes a bow-wielding, hooded vigilante who sets out to fight crime and corruption. It is set in the Arrowverse, sharing continuity with the other television series of the universe. The episode was written by Emilio Ortega Aldrich and Elizabeth Kim and directed by Katie Cassidy.

Stephen Amell stars as Oliver, and is joined by principal cast members David Ramsey, Rick Gonzalez, Juliana Harkavy, Katherine McNamara, Ben Lewis and Joseph David-Jones. The episode follows three storylines; in one, Oliver and Thea Queen find themselves searching through a familiar maze of catacombs. In the second, John Diggle and Lyla Michaels partner on a special ops mission. In the third, set in 2040, Connor Hawke, Mia Smoak, William Clayton and Zoe Ramirez take on John Diggle Jr.

"Leap of Faith" first aired in the United States on The CW on October 29, 2019, and was watched live by 0.76 million viewers, with a 0.3/2 share among adults aged 18 to 49. The episode received generally positive reviews from critics.

== Plot ==
At Nanda Parbat, Oliver Queen fights a hooded figure, who is revealed to be his sister Thea. Oliver tells Thea he is going to die and that he is here to investigate Mar Novu. Oliver leads them to Talia al Ghul, who says there could be records of Novu in her father's records. Once they arrive at the catacombs, Talia finds an artifact that could lead them to the records before Athena shows up and they are forced to flee. They figure out that the records are at the top of the mountain. Talia betrays them and starts to climb the mountain herself, with Oliver and Thea tagging close behind. While Oliver incapacitates Athena and her group, Thea and Talia fight for the journal, with Thea winning. Oliver figures out that the impending crisis is being caused by Novu before saying goodbye to his sister and asking if Talia wishes to join a team known as the "League of Heroes."

Meanwhile, in Hong Kong, John Diggle and Lyla Michaels track down criminal Farzad Qadir, the son of Ghloem Qadir, who is holding Ben Turner's wife Sandra Hawke and son Connor hostage in Kasnia. There, the two locate Sandra and Connor and free them, killing Farzad in the process.

In 2040, William Clayton tries to hack the Deathstroke gang with Mia Smoak covering him. When he gets the info, they go and fight. John Diggle "J. J." Jr., the leader of the Deathstroke gang, kills Zoe Ramirez, prompting Connor to beat him down in a rage. Before Connor can kill J. J., he, Mia and William are mysteriously teleported to 2019 when they meet Oliver, Diggle, Dinah Drake and Rene Ramirez in the Team Arrow's bunker.

== Production ==
=== Development ===
On August 4, 2019, it was announced that the third episode of the eighth season of Arrow would be titled "Leap of Faith". The episode, which is the directorial debut of series regular Katie Cassidy, (Note: Although Cassidy is credited with the special appearance bill, she is still considered a series regular.) was written by Emilio Ortega Aldrich and Elizabeth Kim. Its title is a reference to the Bruce Springsteen song of the same name.

=== Casting ===
Main cast members Stephen Amell, David Ramsey, Rick Gonzalez, Juliana Harkavy, Katherine McNamara, Ben Lewis, and Joseph David-Jones appear as Oliver Queen / Green Arrow, John Diggle, Rene Ramirez and Dinah Drake, Mia Smoak, William Clayton and Connor Hawke. Although credited as part of the cast, Katie Cassidy does not appear as her character Laurel Lance. Willa Holland was a special guest star in this episode, playing Thea Queen after departing as a regular in season six and guest starring in the season seven episode "Emerald Archer". Other guest stars were Audrey Marie Anderson as Lyla Michaels, Andrea Sixtos as Zoe Ramirez, Charlie Barnett as John Diggle Jr., Lexa Doig as Talia al Ghul and Kyra Zagorsky as Athena.

== Reception ==
=== Ratings ===
This episode first aired in the United States on The CW on October 29, 2019, and was watched live by 0.76 million viewers, with a 0.3/2 share among adults aged 18 to 49.

=== Critical response ===
The review aggregator website Rotten Tomatoes reported a 100% approval rating for the episode, based on 11 reviews, with an average rating of 7.49/10. The website's critical consensus reads, "Arrow reflects on its past before being confronted by the future in a wistful installment that pays fond farewell to Willa Holland."

Allison Shoemaker of The A.V. Club rated the episode B+, saying, "Thea, wonderful Thea, has always been great, even when the show had no idea what to do with her. She's especially welcome here, because it's fascinating to see the direction that Arrow has taken her and how it has shifted her dynamic with Oliver." Delia Harrington of Den of Geek said "Arrow brought back an old friend to reboot a dynasty and then absolutely blew our mind in a pivotal, Arrowverse-altering episode." She concluded her review by stating, "I'm genuinely surprised by Arrow and anticipating new episodes in a way that I haven't been in years. I can't think of a better way to send off an old friend than to remember what made them so special in the first place."

Jesse Schedeen of IGN rated the episode 6.1 out of 10, saying "Arrow's final season is spending too much time revisiting the show's checkered past rather than moving forward." Chancellor Agard of Entertainment Weekly gave the episode a B and said, "I really like that Arrow isn't ignoring or breezing past the aftermath of the season premiere. It's still hanging over the characters two episodes later, which makes complete sense. This is also a sign of growth on the show's part because it's not the first time Team Arrow has faced an apocalyptic event. A nuclear bomb went off in a populated town in season 4, and yet you never really got the sense that catastrophe truly affected the team even though it should have, especially because they had been trying to prevent that from happening. Here, though, Earth-2's destruction isn't something they can forget."
