= Purgatory (Arrow) =

- Arrow episode
- Episode no.: Season 8 Episode 7
- Directed by: James Bamford
- Written by: Rebecca Bellotto; Rebecca Rosenberg
- Cinematography by: Gordon Verheul
- Editing by: David Holland
- Production code: T27.13957
- Original air date: November 19, 2019

Guest appearances
- Colton Haynes as Roy Harper; Audrey Marie Anderson as Lyla Micheals/Harbinger; Byron Mann as Yao Fei; Sebastian Dunn as Edward Fyers (uncredited); Jeffrey Robinson as Billy Wintergreen; Tom Cavanagh as Nash Wells (uncredited)

Episode chronology
← Previous "Reset"	Next → "Crisis on Infinite Earths: Part Four"
- Arrow season 8

"Purgatory" is the seventh episode of the eighth and final season, and 167th episode overall of the American television series Arrow based on the DC Comics character Green Arrow, revolving around billionaire playboy Oliver Queen as he returns to Starling City (later renamed Star City), after having been shipwrecked for five years, and becomes a bow-wielding, hooded vigilante who sets out to fight crime and corruption. It is set in the Arrowverse, sharing continuity with the other television series of the universe. The episode is written by story editor Rebecca Bellotto and Rebecca Rosenberg, and directed by co-executive producer James Bamford.

== Plot ==
The team learns that Lian Yu, the island Oliver Queen was stranded on, has been giving off an immense amount of strange energy and Lyla Michaels tasks William Clayton with creating a device to harness it, while the plutonium is being transported by Dinah, Rene and Roy Harper. Upon arrival, their plane is shot down by a missile and crash lands on the island. Diggle, Lyla, and Connor rescue Dinah and Rene, while Oliver and Laurel retrieve the plutonium.

However, they are confronted by Edward Fyers, Billy Wintergreen and Yao Fei – deceased figures from Oliver's past who were all revived by the island's supernatural energy. Meanwhile, Diggle's party finds Roy, whose right arm is pinned; forcing Connor to amputate it, after William completes the weapon, Lyla activates it and transforms; absorbing the island's energy and causing its revived inhabitants to disappear before entering a portal. She later returns, now donning a new outfit and calling herself a "harbinger of things to come", and informs Oliver and Mia Queen that the Crisis has begun as the sky turns red.

In Central City, Nash Wells opens a door and discovers the Anti-Monitor.

== Production ==
=== Writing ===
"Purgatory" was written by Rebecca Bellotto and Rebecca Rosenberg. Bellotto and Rosenberg completed the first draft on September 13, 2019, the second version being completed on the 16th. The third and final version was finished on the 18th, the day before filming began. The episode is titled after the island of Lian Yu (Mandarin Chinese for "purgatory"), which was the setting of most of Arrow's flashback scenes before it was looped into the main story in the season five finale, "Lian Yu", in which the island is blown up in the present. Roy losing his arm is a reference to his comic counterpart, who also loses his arm. However, the comic version lost his arm in a fight with Prometheus, while the Arrowverse version had his arm crushed by the plane debris.

"Purgatory" was directed by James Bamford. The episode began preparation on September 10, 2019, and finished on September 18. Shooting on the episode started the next day on September 19 and finished on October 1, 2019. The closing scene of the episode originally appears in the Batwoman episode, "A Mad Tea-Party"; this scene also closes the Supergirl and The Flash episodes that preceded the "Crisis on Infinite Earths" crossover.

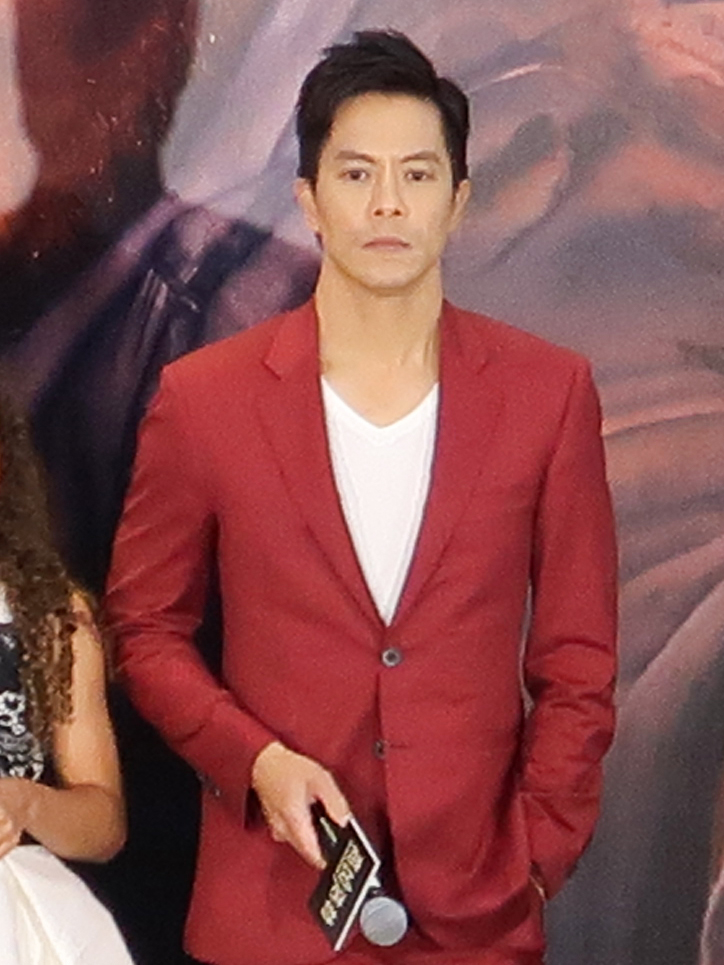
Byron Mann is a Hong Kong-American who previously recurred as Yao Fei in season one

=== Casting ===
"Purgatory" stars Stephen Amell, David Ramsey, Katherine McNamara, Ben Lewis, Katie Cassidy, Rick Gonzalez, Juliana Harkavy, Joseph David-Jones, and LaMonica Garrett as Oliver Queen, John Diggle, Mia Queen, William Clayton, Laurel Lance (Earth-2), Rene Ramirez, Dinah Drake, Connor Hawke, and as both the Monitor and the Anti-Monitor. Several actors who had previously exited the series reprise their roles including Byron Mann as Yao Fei, Colton Haynes as Roy Harper. Sebastian Dunn also guest stars as his character Edward Fyers, but goes uncredited.

The closing scene, featuring Tom Cavanagh as Nash Wells, also ends the Arrowverse episodes "The Last Temptation of Barry Allen, Pt. 2" (The Flash), "A Mad Tea-Party" (Batwoman), and "The Wrath of Rama Khan" (Supergirl). The scene leads directly into the Supergirl episode, "Crisis on Infinite Earths: Part One".

== Reception ==
=== Broadcast ===
"Purgatory" was first aired in the United States on The CW on December 3, 2019. It was watched by 830 thousand viewers with a 0.3/2 share among adults 18–49. When accounting for seven day DVR viewership the episode gains an additional 600 thousand viewers for a total of 1.44 million viewers. The episode held the fourth highest live viewership of the season, as well as the fourth highest when including DVR viewership.

=== Critical reception ===
"Purgatory" received positive reviews from critics, with many calling it a "goodbye" and "conclusion". Andy Behbakht of Screen Rant named the episode the fifth best Arrow episode of 2019. Behbakht felt that having a final return to Lian Yu was a good choice for the final season.

Sarah Little of TVFanatic enjoyed the episode finding it "sad" and "emotional". Little found the goodbye between John and Oliver enjoyable, describing it as a goodbye to the viewer, as opposed to a goodbye between the character.

Delia Harrington of Den of Geek described the episode as " emotional" and "action-packed". She felt that the episode was written as a goodbye. While Harrington praised the episode overall she was somewhat disappointed with the lack of discussion on Roy's arm and the consequences of it.
