= Green Arrow & The Canaries =

- Arrow episode
- Episode no.: Season 8 Episode 9
- Directed by: Tara Miele
- Written by: Beth Schwartz; Marc Guggenheim; Jill Blankenship; Oscar Balderrama
- Cinematography by: Gordon Verheul
- Editing by: David Holland
- Production code: T27.13959
- Original air date: January 21, 2020

Guest appearances
- Charlie Barnett as John Diggle Jr.; Andrea Sixtos as Zoe Ramirez; Raigan Harris as Bianca Bertinelli; Chad Duell as Trevor

Episode chronology
← Previous "Crisis on Infinite Earths: Part Four"	Next → "Fadeout"
- Arrow season 8

"Green Arrow & The Canaries" (also known as "Livin' in the Future") is the ninth episode of the eighth season of the American television series Arrow, based on the DC Comics character Green Arrow, revolving around billionaire playboy Oliver Queen as he returns to Starling City (later renamed Star City), after having been shipwrecked for five years, and becomes a bow-wielding, hooded vigilante who sets out to fight crime and corruption. It is set in the Arrowverse, sharing continuity with the other television series of the universe. The episode was written by showrunners Beth Schwartz and Marc Guggenheim alongside Jill Blankenship and Oscar Balderrama, and directed by Tara Miele.

Principal cast members Juliana Harkavy, Katherine McNamara, Ben Lewis, Joseph David-Jones and Katie Cassidy appear. The episode is the only one not to feature series star Stephen Amell, who plays Oliver Queen / Green Arrow. Set in 2040, it focuses on Oliver's daughter Mia Smoak joining forces with Laurel Lance and Dinah Drake to rescue a kidnapped woman.

"Green Arrow & The Canaries" first aired in the United States on The CW on January 21, 2020, and was watched live by 0.89 million viewers with a 0.3/2 share among adults aged 18 to 49, marking a season high in overnight ratings. The episode received generally positive reviews from critics. Though it was developed as a backdoor pilot for a potential Arrow spin-off series named Green Arrow and the Canaries, that series was ultimately not picked up by The CW.

== Plot ==
Two decades after Oliver Queen sacrificed himself to restore the multiverse, (Note: As depicted in the sixth Arrowverse crossover Crisis on Infinite Earths.) crime in Star City has been quiet. Oliver's daughter Mia, who has just graduated from college, lives in Queen Manor and is in a relationship with John Diggle Jr., who proposes to Mia, which she accepts.

When Helena Bertinelli's adopted daughter and socialite Bianca is abducted, Laurel Lance tells Dinah Drake, who awakened in 2040 after Oliver's funeral for unknown reasons (Note: As depicted in the series finale "Fadeout".) and that the current timeline does not remember who Dinah was, about Bianca's abduction. Laurel shows Dinah footage of a possible future of Star City falling back into crime if Bianca is not rescued and dies. A reluctant Dinah agrees to help Laurel rescue Bianca, but for Oliver rather than herself. Mia celebrates her proposal as a party, which an alive Zoe Ramirez, her brother William, and J.J.'s ex-alcoholic brother Connor Hawke attend. Laurel uses a device on Mia, which restores her pre-Crisis memories, including J.J. being Deathstroke, who had Zoe killed. Laurel reveals the device was created by Cisco Ramon, containing J'onn J'onzz's Martian abilities. Laurel informs Mia of Bianca's situation, which she disbelieves. However, Mia agrees to join upon recovering her Green Arrow training. Laurel plans for Mia to interrogate the Bertinellis to gain information.

Having suspicions about the Bertinelli's having to do with Bianca's abduction, Mia, Laurel, and Dinah infiltrate the Bertinelli's house and place tracking devices around the house. Dinah gets a notification from the tracking device notifying them that Bianca's cousin, Logan, is having precautions and wants to move "it" out of the city, which Laurel believes is Bianca. Laurel, Dinah, and Mia head to Bianca's location. However, they discover Logan is transferring a drug, not Bianca. The group is then attacked by a man wearing a Deathstroke mask and retreats to their headquarters. Laurel argues whether J.J. is behind the Deathstroke mask, prompting Mia to break into J.J.'s office, only to find that he was planning a honeymoon to Fiji and that Bianca is active on social media. Laurel and Dinah still suspect that Bianca was kidnapped and covered up. That night, J.J. breaks up with Mia.

Dinah decrypts a video of Bianca, revealing her captivity at a greenhouse. Laurel eventually convinces Mia to become Green Arrow and help them save Bianca. Dinah shows Mia the decrypted footage, the background design of which Mia deduces to be biophilic, meant to power the building photosynthetically. They track Bianca in a downtown guarded building containing metahuman dampeners. Upon infiltrating the building, they discover that Bianca's ex-boyfriend, Trevor, had kidnapped Bianca because of their breakup and was Deathstroke. The team manages to rescue Bianca and flee to the rooftop, where they confront Trevor. Before burning the building down and committing suicide, Trevor threatens that they cannot stop "her"; the group escapes with Bianca.

In the aftermath, Mia and J.J. reconcile. Laurel decides to move in with Dinah, and the two begin setting up a base of operations to train a new generation of Canaries. While visiting Oliver's memorial statue, Mia recalls the symbol on Trevor's arm is the same as the Queen family hozen, just before the two are ambushed by cloaked figures, who kidnap William. Another cloaked figure breaks into J.J.'s apartment and uses Cisco's memory device on J.J.

== Production ==
=== Development ===
In September 2019, it was announced that The CW was developing a female-led spin-off series of Arrow, with Katherine McNamara, Katie Cassidy, and Juliana Harkavy as the leads, reprising their roles from Arrow. The report also confirmed that an episode of Arrow's eighth and final season would serve as a backdoor pilot for the potential series. In October, Arrow co-creator Marc Guggenheim released an image indicating Green Arrow and the Canaries as the name for the new series. In January 2020, Guggenheim stated that when Arrow was renewed for its final season, series star Stephen Amell was contracted only for nine episodes; The CW later asked Guggenheim for an additional episode to bring the season's count to 10 episodes. Guggenheim realized this episode could become the backdoor pilot for the potential series, so he agreed.

The episode, which is the season's ninth, was originally intended to be titled after the Bruce Springsteen song "Livin' in the Future", continuing the series' tradition of having the penultimate episode of every season titled after a Springsteen song. Because the studio mandated that the backdoor pilot be titled "Green Arrow & The Canaries," after the planned spin-off series, the writers were forced to scrap the original title, though Guggenheim considers it the "real" title. The episode was directed by Tara Miele, and written by season 8 co-showrunner Beth Schwartz, Guggenheim, Jill Blankenship and Oscar Balderrama.

=== Casting ===
"Green Arrow & The Canaries" is the only episode of the series not to feature Amell, due to the death of his character Oliver Queen in the "Crisis on Infinite Earths" crossover event. Main cast members Harkavy, McNamara, Ben Lewis, Joseph David-Jones and Cassidy return as Dinah Drake / Black Canary, Mia Queen, William Clayton, Connor Hawke and Laurel Lance / Black Canary. (Note: Despite the "special appearance" bill, Cassidy is still considered part of the main cast.) The guest cast includes Charlie Barnett as John Diggle Jr., Andrea Sixtos as Zoe Ramirez, Raigan Harris as Bianca Bertinelli and Chad Duell as Trevor.

=== Filming ===
The episode was filmed in October 2019.

== Reception ==
=== Ratings ===
The episode premiered in the United States on The CW on January 21, 2020. It was watched live by 0.89 million viewers with a 0.3/2 share among adults aged 18 to 49, marking a season high in overnight ratings.

=== Critical response ===
The review aggregator website Rotten Tomatoes reported an 86% approval rating for the episode, based on 14 reviews, with an average rating of 7.06/10. The website's critical consensus reads, "Although its placement as a penultimate epilogue to Arrow may give fans mixed feelings, there's no denying that "Green Arrow & the Canaries" is a tantalizing backdoor pilot for a new band of distinctive rogues."

Chancellor Agard of Entertainment Weekly wrote, "As I watched, I couldn't stop thinking about how odd it is that this is Arrow's penultimate episode. When it ended, it didn't feel like we were heading toward the series finale. Nevertheless, I still had a lot of fun watching it." Delia Harrington of Den of Geek wrote that the episode "pulls off something pretty impressive in just an hour, managing to answer many questions about how the Crisis on Infinite Earths affected Arrow's corner of the Arrowverse while the backdoor pilot gave the audience a sense of what the new show's vibe would be and, perhaps most importantly of all, setting up several mysteries to make a spinoff feel like essential viewing." Allison Shoemaker of The A.V. Club wrote, "Does "Green Arrow & The Canaries" work as an argument for the existence of Green Arrow & The Canaries, the future series? Yes. Does it work as one of the final chapters of Arrow? Also yes, though somewhat less successfully."

== Future ==
In June 2020, Guggenheim said that, should the planned series not be picked up, he would potentially resolve the loose ends introduced in the episode in a comic book, while acknowledging that any other Arrowverse series could do the same. In January 2021, The CW officially passed on the spin-off. Guggenheim said this decision was made at the beginning of the COVID-19 pandemic, feeling the pandemic was the "deciding factor" in not moving forward with the series. In 2021, The Flash showrunner Eric Wallace urged viewers to rewatch the episode, as the "Armageddon" event of The Flash's eighth season would provide several answers to the loose ends left behind by the episode.
