= Fadeout (Arrow) =

- Arrow episode
- Episode no.: Season 8 Episode 10
- Directed by: James Bamford
- Written by: Marc Guggenheim; Beth Schwartz
- Cinematography by: Gordon Verheul
- Editing by: Patrick Brian; Jennifer Hoks
- Production code: T27.13960
- Original air date: January 28, 2020
- Running time: 42 minutes

Guest appearances
- Emily Bett Rickards as Felicity Smoak (special guest star); Susanna Thompson as Moira Queen (special guest star); Colton Haynes as Roy Harper / Arsenal (special guest star); Echo Kellum as Curtis Holt (special guest star); Willa Holland as Thea Queen (special guest star); Paul Blackthorne as Quentin Lance (special guest star); Caity Lotz as Sara Lance (special guest star); Audrey Marie Anderson as Lyla Michaels; Melissa Benoist as Kara Danvers (special appearance by); Grant Gustin as Barry Allen (special appearance by); Colin Donnell as Tommy Merlyn (special guest star); Sea Shimooka as Emiko Queen (special guest star); David Nykl as Anatoly Knyazev; Katrina Law as Nyssa al Ghul; Lexa Doig as Talia al Ghul; Joe Dinicol as Rory Regan / Ragman

Episode chronology
← Previous "Green Arrow & The Canaries"	Next → —
- Arrow season 8

"Fadeout" is the series finale of the American TV series Arrow, based on the DC Comics character Green Arrow, revolving around billionaire playboy Oliver Queen as he returns to Starling City (later renamed Star City), after having been shipwrecked for five years, and becomes a bow-wielding, hooded vigilante who sets out to fight crime and corruption. It is set in the Arrowverse, sharing continuity with the other television series of the universe. The tenth episode of the eighth season and the 170th overall of the series, it was written by showrunners Marc Guggenheim & Beth Schwartz, and directed by co-executive producer James Bamford.

Stephen Amell stars as Oliver, and is joined by the season's principal cast members David Ramsey, Rick Gonzalez, Juliana Harkavy, Katherine McNamara and Katie Cassidy. The episode sees the return of Emily Bett Rickards as Felicity Smoak, guest starring following her exit from the series at the end of season seven, alongside appearances from other former cast members including Colton Haynes, Willa Holland and Susanna Thompson. The episode follows two storylines; in one, set in 2012, Oliver and John Diggle deal with a human trafficker. In the second, set in the present, the remnants of Team Arrow team up to rescue Oliver's son William from the same trafficker.

"Fadeout" premiered in the United States on The CW on January 28, 2020, and was watched live by 0.73 million viewers with a 0.2/2 share among adults aged 18 to 49. The episode received generally positive reviews from critics.

== Plot ==
As part of the new timeline that came into existence following the Crisis and Oliver Queen's sacrifice to reboot the multiverse, Moira Queen survives her attempted murder by Slade Wilson in 2014. In the present, Oliver has changed more aspects of the timeline, with John Diggle and Lyla Michaels' pre-Flashpoint daughter Sara being brought back and being J.J.'s sister, Tommy Merlyn, Emiko Queen, and Quentin Lance also being alive and Rory Regan's powers restored. The timeline change has also effectively stopped crime in Star City overnight, making it a safe place for everyone without the need for vigilantes.

Flashbacks to 2012 show Oliver and Diggle hunting down John Byrne, a human trafficker from Oliver's list. When they catch him, Oliver spares him after Diggle tells him to be a better person and not kill those on the list who do not actually deserve to die. In the present, Byrne kidnaps Oliver's son William, prompting the entirety of Team Arrow to look for him. Oliver's daughter Mia Queen, who came from 2040 with Sara Lance for Oliver's funeral, finds William and apprehends Byrne, inspired not to kill him due to her father's example.

During the search for William, Roy Harper proposes to Thea Queen, which she later accepts. Lyla and Diggle tell the team about their plans to move to Metropolis due to the former getting a promotion there while Rene Ramirez reveals his plans to become the next mayor of Star City after Quentin, who endorses him. Dinah Drake talks about her plans to move to Metropolis and fight crime there instead of becoming Chief of Police in Star City.

A public memorial for Oliver as the savior of the world and Star City is held where Quentin gives a speech about Oliver's sacrifice and how he saved the city. The Queen family and Team Arrow later hold a private funeral for Oliver, with Barry Allen, Kara Danvers, Anatoly Knyazev, Talia al Ghul, Nyssa al Ghul, Sara, Tommy, and Quentin also in attendance. At the funeral, Thea wonders why Oliver did not resurrect their father Robert along with everyone else and Moira guesses that it symbolizes how Robert's sacrifice made Oliver a better man and bringing him back would dishonor the only good thing he ever did. Felicity Smoak meets Mia while Diggle says his final vows for Oliver, telling the attendees that while life will continue without him, it will never be the same. Later, as Diggle departs for Metropolis, he witnesses a meteor crash and finds a box emitting a green light. (Note: According to David Ramsey, this scene is a reference to fan theories that Diggle would become the series' version of Green Lantern. Marc Guggenheim said any potential connection with Green Lantern had to be deliberately vague because of a prior agreement the producers of Arrow made with DC Entertainment.) In 2040, the Monitor takes Felicity to reunite with Oliver in the afterlife, where he has finally found peace.

== Production ==
=== Development ===
On October 24, 2019, Arrow co-creator and season eight co-showrunner Marc Guggenheim revealed the title of the series finale to be "Fadeout". The episode, which is the eighth season's tenth and the series' 170th overall, was written by him and co-showrunner Beth Schwartz, and directed by James Bamford.

=== Writing ===
In an August 2019 interview with TVLine, Guggenheim said he "came out of meditation one morning", at which point he had the episode's final scene ready. On October 25, he posted a picture to explain the meaning of the episode's title; in the picture, the "fadeout" is a part of a longbow. According to series star Stephen Amell and fellow actor David Ramsey, they both got the ending they wanted for their respective characters.

=== Casting ===
Main cast members Stephen Amell, David Ramsey, Rick Gonzalez, Juliana Harkavy, Katherine McNamara, and Katie Cassidy appear as Oliver Queen / Green Arrow, John Diggle / Spartan, Rene Ramirez / Wild Dog, Dinah Drake / Black Canary, Mia Smoak, and Laurel Lance / Black Canary respectively. Former series regulars Colin Donnell, Willa Holland, Colton Haynes, Echo Kellum, Paul Blackthorne, Susanna Thompson, Sea Shimooka, and Emily Bett Rickards returned for the series finale as guest stars. McNamara said the return of Rickards's character Felicity Smoak was "so critical" for the storyline, elaborating, "It made even the social aspect of wrapping the show mean so much more because she is so much of what Arrow is". Additional guest stars include Caity Lotz as Sara Lance, Audrey Marie Anderson as Lyla Michaels, Melissa Benoist as Kara Danvers, Grant Gustin as Barry Allen, David Nykl as Anatoly Knyazev, Katrina Law as Nyssa al Ghul, Lexa Doig as Talia al Ghul, and Joe Dinicol as Rory Regan / Ragman.

Johnny Cuthbert co-stars as John Byrne. Main cast member Ben Lewis did not appear as adult William Clayton, with Jack Moore instead co-starring as young William, while archive footage of Lewis from the preceding episode "Green Arrow & The Canaries" was used for one sequence. Additionally, former series regular Manu Bennett appears as Slade Wilson / Deathstroke via unused footage from the second season, and LaMonica Garrett appears as the Monitor via archive footage from the season seven finale "You Have Saved This City". Madison McLaughlin and Jessica De Gouw were offered to reprise their roles as Evelyn Sharp and Helena Bertinelli / Huntress from previous seasons, but could not due to scheduling conflicts.

=== Filming ===
Preparation for the episode began on October 22, and ran until October 30. Filming began on October 31, and ended on November 13. Amell said the episode would feature an action sequence which he described as "the action sequence to end all action sequences". He added that "every stunt guy, more or less who has ever worked on the show, even guys that retired or are coordinating on Supergirl or Flash or Legends, everybody came out. Everybody sold out in terms of what is happening."

== Reception ==
=== Ratings ===
The episode premiered in the United States on The CW on January 28, 2020. It was watched live by 0.73 million viewers with a 0.2/2 share among adults aged 18 to 49.

=== Critical response ===
The review aggregator website Rotten Tomatoes reported a 92% approval rating for the episode, based on 12 reviews, with an average rating of 8/10. The website's critical consensus reads, "Arrow packs up its bow with a heartening emphasis on closure by bringing back a fan favorite, teasing fresh starts for its ensemble, and bidding a sentimental farewell to Oliver Queen."

Brian Lowry of CNN said, "Arrow's series finale felt like an occasion. But the last episode -- coming after the death of its title character -- couldn't help but feel a bit anticlimactic, looking back to its past even as it endeavored to plant seeds for the future." Chancellor Agard of Entertainment Weekly rated the episode B+ and said, "It's an odd hour that has to juggle a lot. While it doesn't always work, it helps that the first seven episodes of the season did such a good job of bringing the show to close to the point that this just felt like a coda more than anything else." Allison Shoemaker of The A.V. Club rated it A− and said, "Why does it feel so right? Because it's both an end and a beginning, and with few exceptions, that will remain true even if it's the end of the road for most of these characters."

== Internet meme ==
A behind-the-scenes image of Gustin throwing up a peace sign over Oliver's grave became a popular Internet meme shortly after the finale aired. In October 2021, Amell expressed his disapproval over an instance of the meme being used during the 2021 Facebook outage.
