= Welcome to Hong Kong =

- Arrow episode
- Episode no.: Season 8 Episode 2
- Directed by: Antonio Negret
- Written by: Jill Blankenship; Sarah Tarkoff
- Cinematography by: Neil Cervin
- Editing by: Patrick Brian
- Original air date: October 22, 2019

Guest appearances
- Audrey Marie Anderson as Lyla Michaels; Andrea Sixtos as adult Zoe Ramirez; Charlie Barnett as adult John Diggle Jr.; Kelly Hu as Chien Na Wei / China White; Rila Fukushima as Tatsu Yamashiro / Katana; Lou Ticzon as David Chin

Episode chronology
← Previous "Starling City"	Next → "Leap of Faith"
- Arrow season 8

"Welcome to Hong Kong" is the second episode of the eighth season of the American television series Arrow, based on the DC Comics character Green Arrow, revolving around billionaire playboy Oliver Queen as he returns to Starling City (later renamed Star City), after having been shipwrecked for five years, and becomes a bow-wielding, hooded vigilante who sets out to fight crime and corruption. It is set in the Arrowverse, sharing continuity with the other television series of the universe. The episode was written by Jill Blankenship and Sarah Tarkoff, and directed by Antonio Negret.

Stephen Amell stars as Oliver, and is joined by principal cast members David Ramsey, Katherine McNamara, Ben Lewis, Joseph David-Jones, LaMonica Garrett and Katie Cassidy. The episode follows three storylines; in one, Oliver is asked by Mar Novu / The Monitor to capture scientist Robert Wong and runs into the Triad. In the second, Earth-2 Laurel Lance asks her old colleague David Chin to get her back to Earth-2. In the third, set in 2040, Connor Hawke has a talk with John Diggle Jr.

"Welcome to Hong Kong" first aired in the United States on The CW on October 22, 2019, and was watched live by 0.77 million viewers, with a 0.3/2 share among adults aged 18 to 49. The episode received generally positive reviews from critics.

== Plot ==
Oliver Queen / Green Arrow wakes up in a room with Mar Novu / The Monitor, who tells him his involvement in Earth-2's events had resulted in its destruction before tasking him with bringing him a biophysicist named Robert Wong. Once Oliver and John Diggle escape alongside Earth-2 Laurel Lance, they realize they are in Hong Kong. Laurel, refusing to believe Earth-2 was destroyed, leaves to find an old colleague that might help her return home.

In a café, Oliver and Diggle are attacked by the Triad and rescued by Tatsu Yamashiro. She reveals she knows who the Monitor is and she knows how to find Wong. Oliver, Diggle, and Tatsu team up to get Wong, but are interrupted by China White, who lets Wong get away. Meanwhile, Lyla Michaels finds Laurel breaking into David Chin's apartment. She asks Chin to find a way back home, but Chin tells her that Earth-2 has been destroyed.

Meanwhile, Oliver breaks into a Triad facility and discovers that Wong has recreated the Alpha/Omega virus that killed Tatsu's son ten years ago. Oliver plans to exchange the virus for Wong, but the deal goes sideways when White brings Wong with an explosive vest controlled by a remote detonator. After Oliver and Diggle get Wong and the virus, Tatsu and White fight for the detonator. Tatsu gets stabbed, but Laurel blasts White off the roof. In the aftermath, after talking with a healing Tatsu, Oliver plans to get more answers about the Monitor at Nanda Parbat. Elsewhere, Lyla is revealed to have been working with the Monitor as she delivers Wong to him.

In 2040, William Clayton works on repairing a device obtained from the Deathstroke Gang while Mia Smoak, Connor Hawke, and Zoe Ramirez head to a black market where John "J.J." Diggle Jr., the leader of the Deathstroke Gang, plans to make a sale. When the Deathstroke Gang arrives, Connor and J.J. enter a parley, though the former's group is forced to let the latter leave when he reveals that he had his men raid the Arrowcave and hold William hostage.

== Production ==
=== Development ===
On July 23, 2019, it was announced that the second episode of the eighth season of Arrow would be titled "Welcome to Hong Kong". The episode was directed by Antonio Negret, and written by Jill Blankenship and Sarah Tarkoff.

=== Writing ===
The title of this episode is a reference to the last line from the season two finale "Unthinkable", spoken by Amanda Waller to Oliver Queen, when he wakes to find himself in Hong Kong. Stephen Amell, who plays Oliver, explained that just as the season premiere was an "ode to season 1", the second episode would be an "ode to season 3", exploring Oliver's time in Hong Kong. Despite it not being in the original script, Amell and Negret worked together to include a scene in the episode showing Oliver putting his wedding ring back on (having impersonated the unmarried Earth-2 Oliver Queen in the previous episode), to demonstrate the way in which his wife, Felicity Smoak, "is ever-present in Oliver's mind".

=== Casting ===
Main cast members Stephen Amell, David Ramsey, Katherine McNamara, Ben Lewis, Joseph David-Jones, LaMonica Garrett and Katie Cassidy appear as Oliver Queen / Green Arrow, John Diggle, Mia Smoak, William Clayton, Connor Hawke, Mar Novu / The Monitor and Laurel Lance / Black Canary. Despite the "special appearance" bill, Cassidy is still considered part of the main cast. The guest cast includes Audrey Marie Anderson, Rila Fukushima, Kelly Hu, Andrea Sixtos, Charlie Barnett and Lou Ticzon as Lyla Michaels, Tastu Yamashiro, China White, Zoe Ramirez, John Diggle Jr., and David Chin respectively. Additionally, Derek Lowe co-stars as Robert Wong. The episode marks Fukushima's return to the series after she was last seen in the season four episode "Unchained". Although uncredited, Emily Bett Rickards appears in the episode as Felicity Smoak, in archive footage.

=== Filming ===
Preparation ran from July 12 until July 22, 2019. Shooting ran from July 23 until August 2, 2019.

== Reception ==
=== Ratings ===
This episode first aired in the United States on The CW on October 22, 2019, and was watched live by 0.77 million viewers, with a 0.3/2 share among adults aged 18 to 49.

=== Critical response ===
The review aggregator website Rotten Tomatoes reported a 100% approval rating for the episode, based on 10 reviews, with an average rating of 7.93/10. The website's critical consensus reads, "'Welcome to Hong Kong' gives Team Arrow time to grieve over global annihilation, resulting in an hour of heartfelt performances and exciting callbacks."

Allison Shoemaker of The A.V. Club rated the episode B, saying, "I must say that the first two episodes of Arrow's eighth season move with a level of confidence and momentum that haven't often been seen in the show's later seasons. There have been glimpses—a few moments here and there in season seven, fewer in season six—but Arrow hasn't had this kind of palpable energy, at least not consistently, since its excellent fifth season." Delia Harrington of Den of Geek rated the episode four out of five stars, saying "plenty of old timey Arrow memories" and "dizzyingly good close combat". She complimented the women's role in the episode stating "it means something, never mind the fact that that's not even all of the women characters in the episode or the show right now."

Jesse Schedeen of IGN rated the episode 7.3 out of 10, noting that Laurel's arc is a big step forward for her character but that the organic flowing of the story doesn't seem very promising. Chancellor Agard of Entertainment Weekly said, "Overall, I loved Laurel in this episode more than anything else. The exploration of Laurel's grief over the loss of Earth-2 is some of the best material Cassidy has ever had on the show and yields one of her best performances."
