= Arrow season 8 =

Arrow
- Season 8
- Promotional poster and home media cover
- Showrunners: Marc Guggenheim; Beth Schwartz
- Starring: Stephen Amell; David Ramsey; Rick Gonzalez; Juliana Harkavy; Katherine McNamara; Ben Lewis; Joseph David-Jones; LaMonica Garrett; Katie Cassidy
- No. of episodes: 10

Release
- Original network: The CW
- Original release: October 15, 2019 – January 28, 2020

Season chronology
- ← Previous; Season 7

The eighth and final season of the American television series Arrow premiered on The CW on October 15, 2019, and concluded on January 28, 2020, with a total of ten episodes. The series is based on the DC Comics character Green Arrow, a costumed vigilante created by Mort Weisinger and George Papp, and is set in the Arrowverse, sharing continuity with other Arrowverse television series and associated media. Executive producers Marc Guggenheim and Beth Schwartz returned as co-showrunners for this season.

Stephen Amell stars as Oliver Queen, with principal cast members David Ramsey as John Diggle, Rick Gonzalez as Rene Ramirez, Juliana Harkavy as Dinah Drake and Katie Cassidy as Laurel Lance also returning from previous seasons. Katherine McNamara, Ben Lewis, and Joseph David-Jones, who previously recurred as the adult versions of Mia Smoak, William Clayton and Connor Hawke, were all promoted to starring status, as was LaMonica Garrett, who stars across multiple Arrowverse shows as the Monitor. Former series regulars Emily Bett Rickards, Colin Donnell, Susanna Thompson, Paul Blackthorne, Colton Haynes, John Barrowman, Willa Holland, Echo Kellum, Sea Shimooka and Josh Segarra all returned as guests.

The series follows Oliver Queen, who claimed to have spent five years shipwrecked on Lian Yu, an island in the North China Sea, before returning home to Starling City (later renamed "Star City") to fight crime and corruption as a secret vigilante whose weapon of choice is a bow and arrow. This season follows Oliver as he fights in a battle that will have the multiverse hanging in the balance.

The series was renewed for an eighth and final season on January 31, 2019, and filming began in Vancouver, British Columbia, in July 2019. The eighth episode features the sixth annual Arrowverse crossover "Crisis on Infinite Earths", with TV series Supergirl, Batwoman, The Flash and Legends of Tomorrow also taking part. The ninth episode was set as a backdoor pilot to the later-scrapped spin-off titled Green Arrow and the Canaries which takes place in the year 2040.

== Episodes ==
Arrow, season 8 episodes
| No. overall | No. in season | Title | Directed by | Written by | Original release date | Prod. code | U.S. viewers (millions) |
|---|---|---|---|---|---|---|---|
| 161 | 1 | "Starling City" | James Bamford | Beth Schwartz & Marc Guggenheim | October 15, 2019 | T27.13951 | 0.84 |
Mar Novu / The Monitor sends Oliver Queen to Earth-2 to retrieve Dwarf Star particles, but they are stolen by this Earth's Tommy Merlyn as the Dark Archer who is looking to use them to level the Glades with his own version of the "Undertaking" in order to avenge Earth-2's Thea. Oliver joins forces with Earth-1 John Diggle as well as Earth-2's Laurel Lance and Adrian Chase to stop Tommy and retrieve the particles. Just as Oliver and Diggle are about to leave, an anti-matter wave suddenly consumes all of Earth-2, barely giving them and Laurel time to escape to Earth-1. In the 2040 flashforwards, Connor Hawke, Mia Smoak, William Clayton, and Zoe Ramirez encounter the Deathstroke Gang, led by Connor's adoptive brother John "J.J." Diggle Jr., who have grown more powerful ever since the destruction of the wall between Star City and the Glades and the defeat of Galaxy One.
| 162 | 2 | "Welcome to Hong Kong" | Antonio Negret | Jill Blankenship & Sarah Tarkoff | October 22, 2019 | T27.13952 | 0.77 |
The Monitor brings Oliver's party to Hong Kong to pick up biophysicist Robert Wong, who was forced to recreate the Alpha/Omega Virus. However, Laurel storms off to get her breach device fixed. While Oliver and Diggle learn more about Wong, Triad members attack them, though Tatsu Yamashiro comes to their aid and reveals she knows of the Monitor. Oliver locates Wong, only for China White to kidnap him. After obtaining a sample of the Alpha/Omega Virus, Oliver arranges a trade with China. While Oliver rescues Wong, Tatsu engages China, who stabs her before Laurel blasts her into the harbor. After talking with Tatsu, Oliver plans to get more answers about the Monitor at Nanda Parbat. Elsewhere, Lyla Michaels is revealed to be working with the Monitor as she delivers Wong to him. In the flashforwards, William works on repairing a device obtained from the Deathstroke Gang while Mia, Connor, and Zoe head to a black market where J.J. plans to make a sale. When the Deathstroke Gang arrives, Connor and J.J. enter a parley, though the former's group is forced to let the latter leave when he reveals that he had his men raid the bunker.
| 163 | 3 | "Leap of Faith" | Katie Cassidy | Emilio Ortega Aldrich & Elizabeth Kim | October 29, 2019 | T27.13953 | 0.76 |
Oliver heads to Nanda Parbat to gain more information on the Monitor from Talia al Ghul, where he reunites with his half-sister Thea and fills her in on his impending death. Oliver, Thea, and Talia plan to retrieve an ancient textbook, but are ambushed by Athena and the League of Assassins. The trio narrowly manage to escape and eventually find the book, learning that the Monitor may actually be causing the oncoming crisis rather than preventing it. Meanwhile, Diggle and Lyla track down Farzad Qadir, who is holding a mother and son captive. As the two free the captives and kill Qadir in the process, Diggle learns that the boy's name is Connor. In the flash-forwards, William managed to escape from the Deathstroke Gang through a trapdoor in the bunker. He discovers their next plan, but it is interrupted by Mia, Connor, and Zoe. J.J. defeats Mia, but when Zoe attacks him, he kills her. Connor beats J.J. down in a rage, but before he can kill him, Connor, William, and Mia are mysteriously teleported to the bunker in the year 2019 where they meet Oliver, Dinah, Rene, and Diggle.
| 164 | 4 | "Present Tense" | Kristin Windell | Oscar Balderrama & Jeane Wong | November 5, 2019 | T27.13954 | 0.62 |
Future and present Team Arrow meet without knowing how the former traveled to the present. Mia and Connor choose to keep details of their time a secret from the others, but William anticipates that they will soon become suspicious. Meanwhile, Grant Wilson leads an army as the new Deathstroke to destroy Star City. After Mia and Connor mistake Grant for a time-displaced J.J., they are confronted by present Team Arrow. William and Connor admit what happens in their time including how J.J. becomes Grant's successor and murders Zoe. Diggle and Rene are left devastated yet determined to change their respective children's fates. The two teams work together to stop Grant and he is arrested. After Oliver is told that Grant has been shipped off to Blackgate Penitentiary, Curtis Holt tells Oliver that the Russian Armed Forces have schematics and components to build an anti-matter weapon. Diggle reconciles with Connor. Laurel and Dinah, intrigued by their future selves' actions, make plans to form the Canaries earlier than expected. Rene begins his campaign in the Glades. Oliver begins to be a father to Mia. Later that night, the Monitor makes a deal with Laurel, promising to restore Earth-2 if she betrays Oliver.
| 165 | 5 | "Prochnost" | Laura Belsey | Benjamin Raab & Deric A. Hughes | November 19, 2019 | T27.13955 | 0.74 |
Oliver learns that their next target is Russian general Alexi Burov, who is working on a pulse wave generator weapon that requires plutonium. Oliver takes William, Mia and Laurel to steal the weapon plans. Laurel discovers that Lyla is working with the Monitor, who she also agrees to work with by stealing the weapon plans before Oliver. Oliver seeks assistance from Anatoly Knyazev to lead him to Burov, who explains he had abandoned the plans, though he has them stored on a hard drive. Burov requests a trade – a cage match for the drive in the Bloodbath, which Oliver accepts. Afterwards, the Bratva led by Oleg intervene and fatally shoot Burov before taking the team captive until Laurel and Anatoly come to free them with William's help. The team then successfully retrieve the drive and celebrate their victory before returning to Star City. Meanwhile, Diggle recruits a reluctant Roy Harper on a heist for plutonium. Following the heist, Roy decides to stay in Star City to help the team against the Monitor. Later that night, Laurel declines Lyla's offer to join her mission as Oliver and Diggle discover Lyla's betrayal, only to get tranquilized.
| 166 | 6 | "Reset" | David Ramsey | Onalee Hunter Hughes & Maya Houston | November 26, 2019 | T27.13956 | 0.79 |
Upon waking, Oliver finds a living Quentin Lance as mayor at a party. When mercenaries take the SCPD hostage demanding to speak to Quentin, he agrees to their terms while Oliver defeats them, only for the leader to set off a bomb. Oliver awakens in his apartment again learning he's re-living the same day. When he discovers Laurel is also experiencing this, they realize the Monitor set this up. Following the third reset, they conclude attempting to stop the bomb results in Quentin's death which causes the reset. On number four, Lyla tells Oliver he is missing the point and shoots Quentin. On number five, Laurel says goodbye to Quentin. On the sixth reset, Lyla informs Oliver Laurel's gone and that he needs to learn to accept the inevitable for everything to end. After a talk with Quentin, Oliver goes through one more reset and allows Quentin to meet his fate. Afterwards, Lyla states that he has passed the Monitor's test by allowing Quentin to have his final moments and reveals the Monitor brought William, Mia, and Connor to the present. Oliver and Laurel wake up on Lian Yu alongside Diggle, William, Mia, and Connor.
| 167 | 7 | "Purgatory" | James Bamford | Rebecca Bellotto & Rebecca Rosenberg | December 3, 2019 | T27.13957 | 0.83 |
The team learns that Lian Yu has been giving off an immense amount of strange energy and Lyla tasks William with creating a device to harness it, while the plutonium to power it is being brought to the island by Dinah, Rene and Roy. Their plane is shot down by a missile and crash-lands on Lian Yu. Diggle, Lyla, and Connor rescue Dinah and Rene, while Oliver and Laurel retrieve the plutonium. However, they are confronted by Edward Fyers, Billy Wintergreen and Yao Fei – deceased figures from Oliver's past who were all revived by the island's supernatural energy. Meanwhile, Diggle's party finds Roy, whose right arm is pinned, forcing Connor to amputate it. After William completes the weapon, Lyla activates it and transforms, absorbing the island's energy and causing its revived inhabitants to disappear before entering a portal. She later returns, now calling herself a "harbinger of things to come", and informs Oliver and Mia that the Crisis has begun as the sky turns red.
| 168 | 8 | "Crisis on Infinite Earths: Part Four" | Glen Winter | Marv Wolfman & Marc Guggenheim | January 14, 2020 | T27.13958 | 1.41 |
In a flashback to the planet Maltus 10,000 years ago, Mar Novu experiments with time travel to see the dawn of time, only to accidentally end up in the anti-matter universe and unleash the Anti-Monitor. Following the multiverse's destruction, the Paragons attempt to find a way out of the Vanishing Point and save the multiverse, including Sara Lance, Barry Allen, Kara Danvers, J'onn J'onzz, Kate Kane, Ryan Choi, and Lex Luthor. With Jim Corrigan's help, Oliver learns how to use the Spectre's powers so he can rescue the Paragons and strengthen Barry's powers. With his increased speed, Barry drops off the Paragons on Maltus to stop Novu, but gets attacked by the Anti-Monitor and loses the others across the Speed Force. Though the team successfully stops Novu and Barry retrieves everyone, upon reaching the dawn of time, they learn the Anti-Monitor was released, regardless. With Oliver's help, the Paragons engage the god-like being and his shadow demons, holding him off long enough for Oliver to combine the Spectre's powers with the Book of Destiny to reboot the multiverse. Oliver succeeds, but he dies a second and final time, with Barry and Sara at his side. Note : This episode continues a crossover event that begins on Supergirl season 5 episode 9, Batwoman season 1 episode 9, and The Flash season 6 episode 9, and concludes on Legends of Tomorrow's special episode.
| 169 | 9 | "Green Arrow & The Canaries" "Livin' in the Future" | Tara Miele | Beth Schwartz & Marc Guggenheim & Jill Blankenship & Oscar Balderrama | January 21, 2020 | T27.13959 | 0.89 |
In 2040, two decades after Oliver's sacrifice saved the multiverse, (Note: As depicted in "Crisis on Infinite Earths".) crime in Star City has been quiet, Mia has led a successful life with her fiancé J.J., and Zoe is alive. When Helena Bertinelli's daughter Bianca goes missing, Laurel requests Dinah's help in finding her. She then recruits a reluctant Mia, restoring her pre-Crisis memories with Martian technology developed by Cisco Ramon, and manages to convince her to take on the mantle of Green Arrow. Mia, Dinah, and Laurel rescue Bianca from the captivity of her ex-boyfriend Trevor, possessing a Deathstroke mask. Just as Mia learns that he is working for someone else, Trevor sets off the gas line and escapes. Afterwards, Dinah decides to establish the Canary Network. At Oliver's memorial, Mia recognizes the hōzen that William was given as a teenager as a tattoo on Trevor's hand before being tranquilized by masked men who make off with William and leave Mia behind. Concurrently, a mysterious figure ambushes J.J. and uses the same Martian technology to restore his pre-Crisis memories, telling J.J that he "needs him". The episode serves as a backdoor pilot for the spin-off series titled Green Arrow and the Canaries, starring Katherine McNamara, Katie Cassidy, and Juliana Harkavy. The series was not commissioned.
| 170 | 10 | "Fadeout" | James Bamford | Marc Guggenheim & Beth Schwartz | January 28, 2020 | T27.13960 | 0.73 |
In flashbacks to 2012, Oliver and Diggle track and imprison human trafficker John Byrne, a man on Oliver's list. A flashback to 2014 depicts Oliver stopping Slade Wilson from killing his mother. In 2040, a time-traveling Sara invites Mia to Oliver's funeral. In the present following Oliver's sacrifice while averting the Crisis, Byrne abducts the younger William. Felicity Smoak and Rory Regan return to assist in the search. Amidst said search, Roy proposes to Thea, who accepts. Mia rescues William, spares Byrne, and has him arrested. Diggle and Lyla agree to move to Metropolis, Dinah declines a promotion, and Rene continues being a mayoral candidate. Oliver's friends and family host a private funeral for him, with a revived Tommy, Moira, Quentin, and Emiko also attending. Emiko meets Thea and Moira for the first time and is welcomed to the family. Tommy reveals to Laurel he was married to her Earth-Prime counterpart in this timeline. Felicity meets the future Mia. Later, Diggle witnesses a meteor crash and finds a box containing an object emitting a green light. In 2040, the Monitor takes Felicity to be with Oliver in a "paradise dimension" where he has finally found peace.

== Cast and characters ==
=== Main ===
- Stephen Amell as Oliver Queen / Green Arrow / Spectre
- David Ramsey as John Diggle / Spartan
- Rick Gonzalez as Rene Ramirez / Wild Dog (Note: Gonzalez also portrays Ramirez's Earth-2 doppelgänger in "Starling City".)
- Juliana Harkavy as Dinah Drake / Black Canary (Note: Harkavy also portrays Drake's Earth-2 doppelgänger in "Starling City".)
- Katherine McNamara as adult Mia Smoak-Queen / Blackstar / Green Arrow
- Ben Lewis as adult William Clayton
- Joseph David-Jones as adult Connor Hawke
- LaMonica Garrett as Mar Novu / Monitor and Mobius / Anti-Monitor (Note: Garrett is only credited for his respective episode appearances.)
- Katie Cassidy as Laurel Lance / Black Canary (Earth-2) (Note: Although Cassidy is credited with the special appearance bill, she is still considered a series regular.) (Note: Earth-1 Laurel Lance is seen through archived footage in "Welcome to Hong Kong", and appears in "Crisis on Infinite Earths: Part Four".)

=== Recurring ===
- Audrey Marie Anderson as Lyla Michaels / Harbinger
- Charlie Barnett as adult John Diggle Jr.
- Andrea Sixtos as adult Zoe Ramirez
- Willa Holland as Thea Queen
- Colton Haynes as Roy Harper / Arsenal
- Paul Blackthorne as Quentin Lance

=== Guest ===
- Colin Donnell as Tommy Merlyn and Tommy Merlyn / Dark Archer (Earth-2)
- Josh Segarra as Adrian Chase / the Hood (Earth-2)
- John Barrowman as Malcolm Merlyn (Earth-2)
- Rila Fukushima as Tatsu Yamashiro
- Kelly Hu as China White
- Lexa Doig as Talia al Ghul
- Kyra Zagorsky as Athena
- Echo Kellum as Curtis Holt
- Jamie Andrew Cutler as Grant Wilson / Deathstroke
- Venus Terzo as Elisa Schwartz
- David Nykl as Anatoly Knyazev
- Barry Levy as Alexi Burov
- Yurij Kis as Oleg
- Sebastian Dunn as Edward Fyers
- Byron Mann as Yao Fei Gulong
- Emily Bett Rickards as Felicity Smoak (Note: Felicity is also seen through archived footage in "Welcome to Hong Kong" and "Green Arrow & The Canaries")
- Susanna Thompson as Moira Queen (Earth-2) and Moira Queen (Note: Thompson also portrays Moira's Earth-2 doppelgänger in "Starling City".)
- Sea Shimooka as Emiko Queen
- Joe Dinicol as Rory Regan / Ragman
- Katrina Law as Nyssa al Ghul
- Manu Bennett as Slade Wilson / Deathstroke (Note: Bennett appears via deleted archive footage from "Seeing Red".)

==== "Crisis on Infinite Earths" ====
- Jon Cryer as Lex Luthor (Earth-38)
- Grant Gustin as Barry Allen / Flash (Note: Also appears in "Fadeout" with the special appearance bill.)
- Caity Lotz as Sara Lance / The Canary / White Canary (Note: Also appears in "Fadeout" as a special guest star.)
- Brandon Routh as Ray Palmer
- Tyler Hoechlin as Kal-El / Clark Kent / Superman (Earth-38) and John Deegan / Superman
- David Harewood as J'onn J'onzz / Martian Manhunter
- Elizabeth Tulloch as Lois Lane (Earth-38)
- Ruby Rose as Kate Kane / Batwoman
- Melissa Benoist as Kara Zor-El / Kara Danvers / Supergirl
- Osric Chau as Ryan Choi
- Stephen Lobo as Jim Corrigan
- Melanie Merkosky as Xneen Novu
- Ezra Miller as Barry Allen (DC Extended Universe) (Note: Billed as a special appearance.)

== Production ==
=== Development ===
On January 31, 2019, The CW renewed Arrow for an eighth season. On March 6, 2019, it was announced that it would be the final season of the series, with an abbreviated ten-episode order. Stephen Amell, who stars as Oliver Queen / Green Arrow, had approached series co-creator Greg Berlanti towards the end of the sixth season about "mov[ing] on" following the expiration of his contract at the end of the seventh season. He had hoped that the series could continue without him, but Berlanti and showrunners Marc Guggenheim and Beth Schwartz decided to conclude the series with a shortened eighth season, which Amell agreed to.

Berlanti, Guggenheim and Schwartz released a press statement saying, "This was a difficult decision to come to, but like every hard decision we've made for the past seven years, it was with the best interests of Arrow in mind [...] We're heartened by the fact that Arrow has birthed an entire universe of shows that will continue on for many years to come. We're excited about crafting a conclusion that honors the show, its characters and its legacy and are grateful to all the writers, producers, actors, and – more importantly – the incredible crew that has sustained us and the show for over seven years."

Speaking at San Diego Comic-Con ahead of the season premiere, Guggenheim commented on the difficulty of approaching the final season without Emily Bett Rickards, who made the decision to step away from her role as Felicity Smoak at the end of the seventh season. He stated that "for the longest time, I've been saying you can't do the show without Emily Rickards. And I think, if the show – if the conversations had been, 'we'll do 22 episodes without Emily,' I would've said, 'you can't do that'", and that the shorter ten-episode run, combined with the crossover, made the prospect feel "a little more realistic".

=== Writing ===
As with the seventh season of Arrow, the eighth season makes extensive use of flashforwards. Stephen Amell revealed that, unlike the serialized approach of previous seasons, this one would follow a more episodic approach due to the limited number of episodes. Katie Cassidy, who plays Laurel Lance, supported Amell's claim, saying each episode would feel like a "miniature movie". The penultimate episode, which serves as a backdoor pilot to Green Arrow and the Canaries was originally intended to be titled after the Bruce Springsteen song "Livin' in the Future", continuing the series' tradition of having the penultimate episode of every season titled after a Springsteen song. Because the studio mandated that the backdoor pilot be titled after the planned spin-off series, the writers were forced to scrap the original title.

=== Casting ===
Main cast members Stephen Amell, David Ramsey, Rick Gonzalez, Juliana Harkavy and Katie Cassidy returned as Oliver Queen / Green Arrow, John Diggle, Rene Ramirez, Dinah Drake and Earth-2's Laurel Lance respectively. Following the announcement that she would be leaving the series at the end of its seventh season, this was the first and only season not to feature Emily Bett Rickards, who portrayed Felicity Smoak, as either a recurring or main cast member, although the producers left open the possibility of her making a guest appearance in the final season. Rickards appears as Felicity through archive footage in the episodes "Welcome to Hong Kong" and "Green Arrow & The Canaries". In November 2019, Amell confirmed that Rickards would return for the series finale.

In June 2019, Joseph David-Jones, who recurred in the seventh season as the adult version of Connor Hawke, was promoted to the main cast, and that July Katherine McNamara and Ben Lewis were also promoted to regular status in their roles as the adult versions of Mia Smoak and William Clayton respectively. It was also announced that former series regulars Colin Donnell, Josh Segarra, John Barrowman and Susanna Thompson would reprise their roles as Tommy Merlyn, Adrian Chase, Malcolm Merlyn and Moira Queen in a guest capacity. In August, it was announced that Colton Haynes, who portrayed Roy Harper as a series regular in the seventh season, would not return with the same status, though Schwartz stated that she hoped to have him back in some capacity. Haynes said he did not exit the season, but that he was "not asked to come back for the final season as a series regular", and added that Roy is "never gone for too long". In September, it was announced that Willa Holland would return as Thea Queen in a recurring role, after departing as a regular in the sixth season and returning as a guest star in the seventh. In the same month, Charlie Barnett was cast in the role of the adult version of John Diggle Jr. In October, it was announced that Haynes would appear in the season in a recurring role. In November, it was announced that Paul Blackthorne would return as Quentin Lance in a recurring role, after departing as a regular in the sixth season and returning as a guest star in the seventh.

=== Design ===
In July 2019, a new Green Arrow costume was unveiled on the Entertainment Weekly magazine cover. A new Spartan costume was revealed by Guggenheim and a new Black Canary costume was revealed in the season's first trailer.

=== Filming ===
Filming began on July 11, 2019, and lasted until November 13. The season's third episode, "Leap of Faith", marks Cassidy's directorial debut. On October 21, filming for the ninth episode, the backdoor pilot for Green Arrow and the Canaries, began.

=== Arrowverse tie-ins ===
In December 2018, during the end of that year's Arrowverse crossover "Elseworlds", a follow-up crossover – titled "Crisis on Infinite Earths" and based on the comic book series of the same name – was announced. The crossover took place over five episodes – three in December 2019, and two (including the Arrow episode) in January 2020.

== Release ==
=== Broadcast ===
The season premiered on October 15, 2019, in the United States on The CW. Additionally, The CW aired a retrospective special titled "Hitting the Bullseye" which preceded the series finale.

=== Home media ===
The season was released on DVD and Blu-ray on April 28, 2020, with special features including the show's 2019 San Diego Comic-Con panel, the special "Hitting the Bullseye" and all five episodes of the sixth annual Arrowverse crossover event, "Crisis on Infinite Earths".

== Reception ==
=== Critical response ===
The review aggregation website Rotten Tomatoes reports a 95% approval rating for the eighth season, with an average rating of 7.5/10 based on 125 reviews. The site's critics consensus reads, "Oliver Queen's final adventure hits emotional peaks while spearheading the game-changing 'Crisis on Infinite Earths', giving the Emerald Archer a rousing sendoff."

Katie Cassidy's portrayal of Earth-2 Laurel Lance was praised by critics, with TVLine calling her development "one of the most enjoyable aspects of Arrow's 10-episode farewell run". Cassidy additionally received an honorable mention on TVLine's Performer of the Week for her performance on "Welcome to Hong Kong".

=== Ratings ===
Viewership and ratings per episode of Arrow season 8
| No. | Title | Air date | Rating/share (18–49) | Viewers (millions) | DVR (18–49) | DVR viewers (millions) | Total (18–49) | Total viewers (millions) |
|---|---|---|---|---|---|---|---|---|
| 1 | "Starling City" | October 15, 2019 | 0.3/2 | 0.84 | 0.3 | 0.82 | 0.6 | 1.66 |
| 2 | "Welcome to Hong Kong" | October 22, 2019 | 0.3/2 | 0.77 | 0.2 | 0.65 | 0.5 | 1.42 |
| 3 | "Leap of Faith" | October 29, 2019 | 0.3/2 | 0.76 | 0.2 | 0.59 | 0.5 | 1.35 |
| 4 | "Present Tense" | November 5, 2019 | 0.2/1 | 0.62 | 0.3 | 0.65 | 0.5 | 1.27 |
| 5 | "Prochnost" | November 19, 2019 | 0.2/1 | 0.74 | 0.3 | 0.60 | 0.5 | 1.33 |
| 6 | "Reset" | November 26, 2019 | 0.3/1 | 0.79 | 0.2 | 0.62 | 0.5 | 1.41 |
| 7 | "Purgatory" | December 3, 2019 | 0.3/2 | 0.83 | 0.3 | 0.61 | 0.6 | 1.44 |
| 8 | "Crisis on Infinite Earths: Part Four" | January 14, 2020 | 0.5/3 | 1.41 | 0.4 | 1.03 | 0.9 | 2.44 |
| 9 | "Green Arrow & The Canaries" | January 21, 2020 | 0.3/2 | 0.89 | 0.2 | 0.57 | 0.5 | 1.46 |
| 10 | "Fadeout" | January 28, 2020 | 0.2/2 | 0.73 | 0.3 | 0.65 | 0.5 | 1.38 |
