= Prochnost =

- Arrow episode
- Episode no.: Season 8 Episode 5
- Directed by: Laura Belsey
- Written by: Benjamin Raab; Deric A. Hughes
- Cinematography by: Gordon Verheul
- Editing by: Patrick Brian
- Production code: T27.13955
- Original air date: November 19, 2019

Guest appearances
- David Nykl as Anatoly Knyazev; Colton Haynes as Roy Harper; Audrey Marie Anderson as Lyla Michaels

Episode chronology
| ← Previous "Present Tense" | Next → "Reset" |
- Arrow season 8

"Prochnost" is the fifth episode of the eighth and final season, and 165th episode overall of the American television series Arrow based on the DC Comics character Green Arrow, revolving around billionaire playboy Oliver Queen as he returns to Starling City (later renamed Star City), after having been shipwrecked for five years, and becomes a bow-wielding, hooded vigilante who sets out to fight crime and corruption. It is set in the Arrowverse, sharing continuity with the other television series of the universe. The episode is written by co-executive producers Benjamin Raab and Deric A. Hughes and directed by Laura Belsey.

Stephen Amell stars as Oliver Queen, and is joined by principal cast members David Ramsey, Katherine McNamara, Ben Lewis, and Katie Cassidy. Former series regular Colton Hayes reprises his role as Roy Harper.

== Plot ==
Oliver and Mia are preparing in the Team Arrow shelter when William informs then that Curtis has discovered a Russian general hoping to assemble a Pulse Wave Generator, something that is required for their Crisis-halting gadget. Oliver decides to take both Mia and William. Once in Russia, Oliver, Laurel, and the children sync up with Anatoly. Anatoly rapidly finds the General they're searching for at a nearby battle club and he consents to hand over the plans under one condition: Oliver fights the boss at the battle club. Oliver makes brisk work of the warrior and as he's going to get the plans from the general, individuals from the Bratva appear and slaughter him. They steal Oliver and Mia as Anatoly, Laurel, and William get away.

The Bratva gets Mia through the chime test. After she defeats the Bratva, the boss permits her and Oliver to live if they surrender the weapon plans. Oliver concurs and the Bratva take the drive to sell. Oliver and Mia get away and connect up with the remainder of the group, where they reveal the Bratva wanting to sell the plans. This prompts a run in the middle of Oliver and Mia as he needs both of his children to get back and avoid inconvenience. Mia leaves and is trailed by Laurel as Oliver and Anatoly remain and visit. As destiny would have it, both Oliver and Mia chill off and offer some kind of reparation, permitting the group to reunite to find the Bratva and the plans. The group reunite to the battle club, driving Oliver and Mia to battle six warriors without a moment's delay in order to successfully distract the Bratva. Laurel and Anatoly get the arrangement and shoot the Bratva pioneer, permitting the entire group to get away.

Elsewhere, Diggle finds Roy and requests that he help take plutonium to control the gadget. As the shipment shows up, Roy begins beating one of the equipped gatekeepers to death yet Diggle's ready to stop him. The two take the plutonium and leave. After the crucial, reveals to Diggle he anticipates remaining around so he can rejoin Team Arrow. At the point when everybody gets back, Laurel uncovers to Lyla she has no aim of helping her and the Monitor. It's uncovered Laurel set Lyla up and brought Diggle and Oliver along. As the two beginning assembling pieces, they're shot with sedatives.

== Production ==
=== Writing ===
"Prochnost" was written by Ben Raab and Deric A. Hughes. Raab and Hughes finished the production draft on August 22, 2019. The blue revisions were completed four days later on August 26. The title of the episode prochnost or Прочность is a Russian word that when translated into English means "strength".

=== Filming ===
"Prochnost" was directed by Laura Baley. The episode began preparation on August 16, 2019, and ended on August 26. Filming began the next day and wrapped September 9, 2019.

=== Casting ===
"Prochnost" stars Stephen Amell, David Ramsey, Katherine McNamara, Ben Lewis, and Katie Cassidy, as Oliver Queen, John Diggle, Mia Queen, William Clayton, Laurel Lance (Earth-2). The episode guest stars former series regular Colton Haynes reprising his role as Roy Harper. David Nykl also reprises his role as Anatoly Knyazev.

== Reception ==
=== Broadcast ===
"Prochnost" was first aired in the United States on The CW on November 19, 2019. It was watched by 740 thousand viewers with a 0.2/1 share among adults 18–49. When accounting for seven day DVR viewership the episode gains an additional 600 thousand viewers for a total of 1.33 million viewers.

=== Critical reception ===
"Prochnost" received positive reviews from critics. Andy Behbakht of Screen Rant, named the episode the sixth best Arrow episode of 2019.

Sarah Little of TVFanatic enjoyed the episode praising its references to season five saying they were "the best blasts from the past", describing the episode as "an ode to season five". Little found the interactions between Oliver and Mia as "satisfying to watch". Additionally she found the returning cast members as a breath of fresh air, particularly Anatoly who for most of his last appearance was against Oliver instead of considering him a brother. Little claimed that she was not expecting the joy present-time Roy's return would give her, stating that Roy "fits right back in with Team Arrow".

Delia Harrington of Den of Geek rated the episode a 4/5 calling it a "nostalgia filled adventure". Harrington felt that Lyla saving herself cheapened the impact of the original Laurels death, but respected the shows decision to distinguish between the two Laurels. She was surprised by Lyla's betray of Oliver and John, and was excitedly anticipating the fall out. Harrington compared Roy's trauma healing via his team to Captain America traveling back in time to heal his trauma alone at the end of Avengers: Endgame.

Micheal Patterson of WhatCulture enjoyed the episode and only had one major problem with it being the fact that the episode has characters accept big things quickly and not ask further questions. Patterson had several things he enjoyed about the episode including how past events in the show influenced the present, the return of Colton Hayes as Roy Harper, Oliver and Anatoly having a final goodbye, and the closing moments of the episode teasing the future.
