= Garden Party (2008 film) =

2008 American film

- Theatrical release poster
- Directed by: Jason Freeland
- Written by: Jason Freeland
- Produced by: Jason Freeland; Tim Youd
- Starring: Vinessa Shaw; Willa Holland
- Cinematography: Robert Benavides
- Edited by: Daniel R. Padgett
- Music by: John Swihart
- Distributed by: Roadside Attractions
- Release date: July 11, 2008
- Running time: 88 minutes
- Country: United States
- Language: English

Garden Party is a 2008 American drama film directed by Jason Freeland, and starring Vinessa Shaw and Willa Holland. A low-budget independent film, it marked Jennifer Lawrence's film debut.

== Cast ==
- Vinessa Shaw as Sally St. Claire
- Willa Holland as April
- Richard Gunn as Todd
- Patrick Fischler as Anthony
- Fiona Dourif as Becky
- Erik Smith as Sammy
- Alexander Cendese as Nathan
- Ross Patterson as Joey Zane
- Jordan Havard as Wayne
- Christopher Allport as Davey Diamond
- Jeffrey R. Newman as Carlos
- Jennifer Lawrence as Tiff
- Carrie Finklea as Lost Girl

== Reception ==
On the review aggregator website Rotten Tomatoes, 16% of 19 critics' reviews are positive. Metacritic, which uses a weighted average, assigned the film a score of 31 out of 100, based on 10 critics, indicating "generally unfavorable" reviews.

Writing for New York Post, Kyle Smith rated it 0,5/4 stars, calling it a "slow ride to nowhere."
