= Willa Holland =

American actress (born 1991)

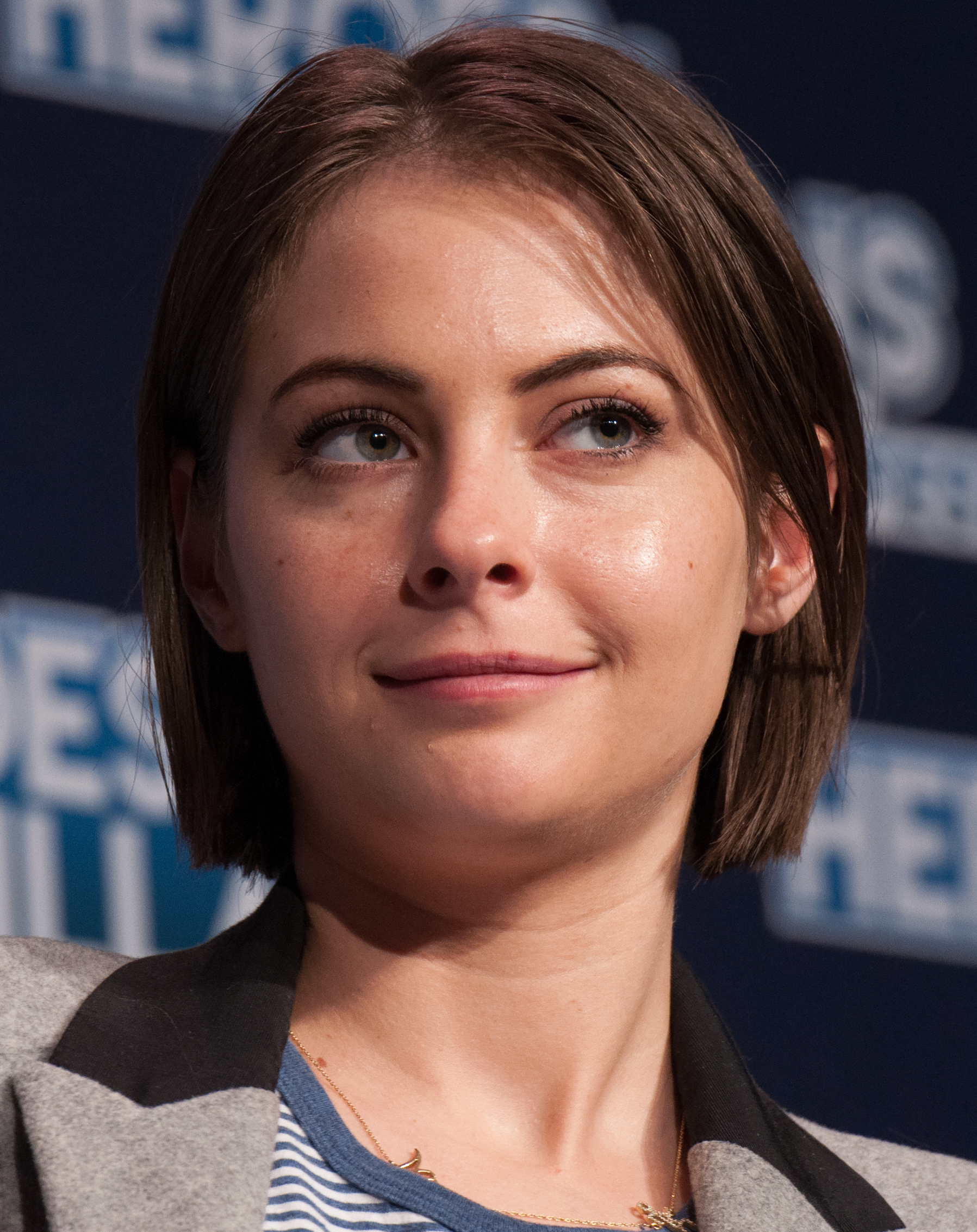
- Holland in 2017
- Born: June 18, 1991 (age 35); Los Angeles, California, U.S.
- Occupations: Actress; model
- Years active: 1995–present
- Relatives: Brian De Palma (stepfather; 1995–1996)

Willa Joanna Chance Holland (born June 18, 1991) is an American actress and model. She is known for her roles as Kaitlin Cooper in the Fox teen drama The O.C., Aqua in Kingdom Hearts, and Thea Queen in the CW series Arrow and its spin-off, The Flash.

== Early life ==
Holland grew up with two sisters: Brianna Holland and Piper De Palma, from her mother Darnell Gregorio's then-marriage to film director Brian De Palma. She briefly attended Palisades Charter High School before leaving to focus on her acting career.

== Career ==
At age seven, while visiting her stepfather's neighbor in The Hamptons, New York, Holland was noticed by film director, Steven Spielberg. He advised Holland's parents "to put her in front of a camera."

Upon returning to Los Angeles that September, Holland signed with Ford Modeling Agency, and immediately booked a shoot for Burberry. She has also modeled for Guess, Gap, Abercrombie & Fitch and Ralph Lauren.

In 1999, De Palma introduced Holland to a theatrical talent agency. She subsequently appeared in several national commercials. In 2001, when Holland was ten, she worked alongside her father in Ordinary Madness. She was initially cast to co-star in the 2005 Fox series The Inside with fellow model Rachel Nichols, but left the show when writer Tim Minear was brought in to overhaul it. She initially played the role of Kaitlin Cooper on The O.C., replacing Shailene Woodley, first as a recurring character in season 3, and then as a regular in season four.

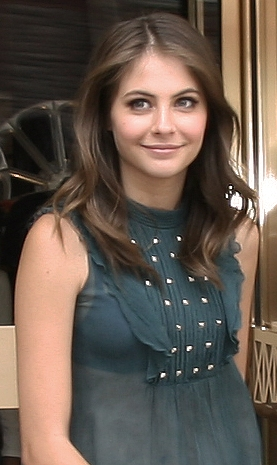
Holland at the 2008 Toronto International Film Festival

In December 2007, Holland was cast in the independent drama film Garden Party, as April, a troubled teenage aspiring model who tries to make it in Los Angeles. In September 2008, The CW announced Holland would appear in three episodes of the second season of the teen-drama television series Gossip Girl, created by The O.C. creator Josh Schwartz. Holland played the role of a rebellious 16-year-old model who befriends and creates havoc for Jenny Humphrey (Taylor Momsen). In March 2010, Holland made a one-off return in the 16th episode of the third season, "The Empire Strikes Jack".

In May 2010, Square Enix announced Holland would voice Aqua in the PlayStation Portable title Kingdom Hearts Birth by Sleep, which was released on September 7, 2010 in North America. That same year, Holland starred in her first major studio film, the apocalyptic thriller film Legion, playing the role of a bratty teenager. She played Janice Heddon in the film Straw Dogs (2011), a remake of the 1971 film of the same name.

In February 2012, Holland was cast in The CW action-adventure series Arrow as Thea Queen / Speedy, the sister of Oliver Queen / Green Arrow. She remained a regular cast member in the series until leaving during the sixth season episode "The Thanatos Guild". Holland returned for a cameo in the season seven episode "Emerald Archer". She returned twice during the eight and final season, first in the episode "Leap of Faith", then in the series finale "Fadeout".

In the 2012 film Tiger Eyes, Holland played Davey Wexler. The film was based on the 1981 novel of the same name written by Judy Blume.

== Filmography ==
Film roles
Year	Title	Role	Notes
2001	Ordinary Madness	Young Faye	
2007	Chasing 3000	Jamie	
2008	Garden Party	April	
2008	Genova	Kelly	
2008	Middle of Nowhere	Taylor Elizabeth Berry	
2010	Legion	Audrey Anderson	
2010	Humanity's Last Line of Defense	Herself	Documentary
2011	Straw Dogs	Janice Heddon	
2012	Tiger Eyes	Davey Wexler	
2016	Blood in the Water	Veronica	
2023	The Dirty South	Sue Parker	
2026	The Mortuary Assistant	Rebecca Owens	

Television roles
Year	Title	Role	Notes
2005	The Comeback	Kalla	Episode: "Valerie Hangs with the Cool Kids"
2006–2007	The O.C.	Kaitlin Cooper	Recurring role (season 3); main role (season 4)
2008–2012	Gossip Girl	Agnes Andrews	Recurring role
2012–2020	Arrow	Thea Queen	Main role (seasons 1–6); special guest star (season 7); recurring role (season 8)
2015–2016	The Flash	Thea Queen	Special guest star; 2 episodes
2024	Based on a True Story	Stepmother	Episode: "Based on a Drew Story"

Video game roles
Year	Title	Voice role	Notes
2006	Scarface: The World Is Yours	Assassin	Uncredited
2010	Kingdom Hearts Birth by Sleep	Aqua	
2012	Kingdom Hearts 3D: Dream Drop Distance	Aqua	
2014	Kingdom Hearts Birth by Sleep Final Mix	Aqua	New footage for Final Mix-exclusive Secret Episode and archived footage
2017	Kingdom Hearts 0.2: Birth by Sleep – A Fragmentary Passage	Aqua	
2019	Kingdom Hearts III	Aqua	Also provided additional footage for the Re:Mind (2020) DLC
2020	Kingdom Hearts: Melody of Memory	Aqua	

Music video roles
Year	Title	Artist
2008	"Keep Me Up All Night"	The Glitterati
2010	"Fearless Love"	Melissa Etheridge
2011	"8050 (Too Fast, Too Slow)"	White Arrows

== Awards and nominations ==
Year	Award	Nominated work	Result	Ref.
2012	Boston International Film Festival Award for Best Actress	Tiger Eyes	Won	
