= Jade (2024 film) =

- Release poster
- Directed by: James Bamford
- Written by: Glenn Ennis; Lynn Colliar
- Produced by: Roy Scott MacFarland; Sam Levine
- Starring: Shaina West; Mickey Rourke; Mark Dacascos; Katherine McNamara
- Production companies: Tetrad Studio; 120db Films; 13 Films
- Distributed by: Well Go USA Entertainment; 101 Films; All Rights Entertainment
- Release date: June 24, 2024
- Running time: 88 minutes
- Country: United States
- Language: English

Jade is a 2024 American action thriller film directed by James Bamford, written by Glenn Ennis and Lynn Colliar, and starring Mickey Rourke, Mark Dacascos, Katherine McNamara and Shaina West.

== Plot ==
Jade, a young English woman gets entangled between a crime boss and a powerful businessman who are looking for the hard drive that can jeopardize the Interpol. She must use her skills and face her nemesis to retrieve the drive and protect the mother of her brother’s unborn child.

== Cast ==
- Shaina West as Jade
- Mickey Rourke as Tork
- Mark Dacascos as Reese
- Katherine McNamara as Layla
- Steven Michael Quezada as Chavez
- Keith Jardine as Kieth
- Chris Bruno as Rodriquez
- Matthew Yanagiya as Logan
- Marcus Auerilo as Bains
- Emily Eruraviel as Emily

== Production ==
In June 2021, it was announced that Rourke and Dacascos were cast in the film. In March 2022, it was announced that McNamara was added to the cast and that filming occurred in Albuquerque, New Mexico.

== Release ==
The film was released digitally on June 24, 2024.

== Reception ==
Leslie Felperin of The Guardian awarded the film three stars out of five.
