= Thea Queen =

Fictional character from the television series Arrow

- Arrowverse character
- Willa Holland as Thea Dearden Queen on Arrow in her Speedy costume
- First appearance: "Pilot"; Arrow Season 1×1; October 10, 2012
- Last appearance: "Fadeout"; Arrow Season 8×10; January 28, 2020
- Created by: Greg Berlanti; Marc Guggenheim; Andrew Kreisberg
- Portrayed by: Willa Holland

In-universe information
- Full name: Thea Dearden Queen
- Aliases: Speedy; Thea Merlyn; Mia
- Occupation: Bar manager; Mayoral chief of staff
- Family: Robert Queen (legal father/stepfather; deceased); Moira Queen (mother); Malcolm Merlyn (biological father; deceased); Oliver Queen (maternal half-brother; deceased); Tommy Merlyn (paternal half-brother); Emiko Adachi (legal paternal half-sister); William Clayton (nephew); Mia Smoak (niece); Felicity Smoak (sister-in-law)
- Significant others: Roy Harper (fiance); Alex Davis (boyfriend; deceased)
- Sidearm: Bow and arrow Sword

Thea Dearden Queen, also known as Speedy, is a fictional character portrayed by Willa Holland on The CW television series Arrow, created by Greg Berlanti, Marc Guggenheim, and Andrew Kreisberg. She is the maternal half-sister of series protagonist Oliver Queen / Green Arrow. Although an original creation to the series, she adopts elements from the DC Comics superhero Mia Dearden / Speedy, created by writer Kevin Smith and artist Phil Hester.

Holland was a main cast member on Arrow from its first season until its sixth, and also crossed over to the spin-off Arrowverse series The Flash. Although Thea Queen is loosely inspired by the existing comics character Mia Dearden, a sidekick of Green Arrow, the idea of Green Arrow working alongside his archer half-sister was later incorporated back into the comics in the form of Emiko Queen.

== Fictional character biography ==
=== Early life ===
Thea Queen was born on January 21, 1995 in Star City to Robert and Moira Queen, (although it is later revealed that Thea is Malcolm Merlyn's biological daughter) and the younger half-sister of Oliver Queen. Though Malcolm was unaware that Thea was his daughter, and Thea was likewise in the dark, Robert was aware but still loved Thea like his own. When her father and brother were both presumed dead, Thea felt alone and disconnected from the world. She fell into a life of drugs and partying to fill the void left by her father and brother.

=== Season 1 ===
Thea is introduced as a senior in high school who is grateful to have her big brother back, but his disappointment in her lifestyle and the secrets he keeps from her about his five years away cause her to slip even further into drug use. On her 18th birthday, she is involved in a car crash while on the narcotic Vertigo and is subsequently arrested and sentenced to community service for 500 hours at CNRI (City Necessary Resources Initiative) under the supervision of Laurel Lance. Her addiction to Vertigo causes an animosity between her returned brother's alter-ego the Arrow and the drug's creator the Count.

Later that year, Thea falls in love with Roy Harper, a lifelong street criminal whom she meets when he steals her purse. Though he initially has no romantic interest in Thea despite an obvious physical attraction to her, mainly out of resentment because of her wealth, Roy later begins to genuinely fall in love with her.

=== Season 2 ===
After the Undertaking and Oliver's disappearance, Thea takes over his club, Verdant, while maintaining her relationship with Roy. That year, after learning of her true paternity from Slade Wilson, losing her club to Isabel Rochev (who had taken Queen Consolidated out from under Oliver), breaking up with Roy (now a member of Oliver's team and under the influence of Mirakuru), and the death of her mother, Thea decides to leave town. While waiting for her train, she is attacked by a Mirakuru-enhanced soldier and rescued by Malcolm, who reveals himself to still be alive. After discovering that Roy worked with the Arrow, Thea, betrayed once again, decides to go with her father and leaves Starling City and her family behind, with no intentions of coming back.

=== Season 3 ===
Thea begins the season in Corto Maltese receiving combat training from Malcolm, though she soon decides to return to Starling with Oliver. She also reopens her nightclub after Malcolm secretly buys the foundry from Queen Consolidated for her. She learns Oliver's secret identity as the Arrow when he shows her his hideout under the nightclub and begins to distrust Malcolm after learning that he already knows about Oliver's secret. She has a one-night stand with her club DJ, but he turns out to be a league of assassin spy. Thea is told that her father used her as a pawn against both Oliver and Ra's al Ghul by drugging and manipulating her into killing Sara Lance; she arranges for him to be captured by the League in retaliation. She reconciles with Roy but is nearly killed by Ra's and is brought back to life in the Lazarus Pit in exchange for Oliver joining the League of Assassins. Thea blames herself for letting her brother join the League. Roy breaks up with her when he leaves Starling City after faking his death, hoping that Thea can make a life of her own without him. He also leaves her his red costume which she wears to become a vigilante herself as his successor.

=== Season 4 ===
Thea works with Oliver and his friends in the fight against the terrorist organization H.I.V.E. By Oliver's request, the team refers to her in the field as "Speedy" (over her insistence to be called "Red Arrow"). Despite the enjoyment of being a vigilante, Thea's behaviour has become increasingly volatile and reckless when in the field, which Oliver realizes is a side effect of being in the Lazarus Pit. In addition, Thea helps Laurel to bring Sara back from the dead in hopes of making amends towards the Lance family. Because of this, Thea is telepathically linked with Sara after her resurrection upon the Lazarus Pit. It is also revealed that Thea's Lazarus Pit side effect is able to counterattack Damien Darhk's life force drain in addition relieving her bloodlust temporarily. Thea is dying as the result of the Pit's restorative effect waning. With Tatsu Yamashiro's help, Nyssa al Ghul gives Oliver the 'Lotus', an elixir used by the Crescent Order that permanently reverses the effects of the Lazarus Pit, saving her life. She helps Oliver to become a new candidate for mayor and meets a new boyfriend Alex Davis. Damien Darhk's wife, Ruvé Adams, eventually brainwashes her boyfriend into kidnapping her to a miniaturized H.I.V.E. facility built from stolen technology belonging to Oliver's ally Ray Palmer.

After she fell under Malcolm's influence again and threatened to kill Darhk's daughter after being released (including the death of her boyfriend at the hands of Lonnie Machin), and following Darhk's defeat, Thea decided to leave the team as she didn't like what she was becoming.

=== Season 5 ===
Having retired from life as a vigilante, Thea continues to help Oliver in a civilian capacity as his chief of staff (Oliver having been appointed mayor after the death of Ruvé Darhk) and has proven herself to be an able politician, often picking up the slack for Oliver, who simultaneously worked as the Green Arrow. She hires Quentin Lance, who had been fired from the SCPD after revealing that he had previously collaborated with Damien Darhk, as the city's deputy mayor, having some daughter-father figure relationship and helping him to beat his alcoholism.

Thea temporarily comes out of retirement as Speedy to save Oliver from Tobias Church's thugs and when the Dominators attack Earth.

After Oliver's near-impeachment, Thea decides to resign as his chief of staff, fearing that she was relying too heavily on dirty politics, including tarnishing reporter Susan Williams' reputation and considering blackmailing a city council member for his vote.

Thea, along with the rest of Team Arrow, is captured by Adrian Chase and taken to Lian Yu. After stepping on a landmine, Thea is pushed off of it by her father, who had joined forces with Oliver to rescue her; he later detonates the landmine to take out Digger Harkness and some of Chase's henchmen, leaving Thea devastated over the loss of a man whom she hates. Chase later destroys the C4-rigged Lian Yu by shooting himself dead, with Thea still on the island.

=== Season 6 ===
Five months after the destruction of Lian Yu, Thea is alive but has been left comatose since the incident. In the episode "Thanksgiving", she awakens, and returns to vigilantism in the episode "Doppelganger". In the episode "The Thanatos Guild", Thea decides to leave Team Arrow to travel the world to destroy Ra's al Ghul's remaining Lazarus Pits alongside Nyssa and Roy.

=== Season 7 ===
When Roy returns to Star City, he claims that he, Thea and Nyssa had discovered and destroyed two new Lazarus Pits. He also reveals to have been killed by the Thanatos Guild and then revived by Thea and Nyssa with one of the Lazarus Pits.

=== Season 8 ===
When Oliver heads to Nanda Parbat to gain more information on the Monitor from Talia al Ghul, he reunites with Thea and fills her in on his impending death. Oliver, Thea, and Talia plan to retrieve an ancient textbook, but are ambushed by Athena and the League of Assassins. The trio narrowly manage to escape and eventually find the book; learning that the Monitor may actually be causing the oncoming crisis rather than preventing it. With Athena and her League allies now dead, Thea, as the new Ra's al Ghul, suggests to Talia that they should rebrand the League to become heroes instead of assassins. She then offers Talia the opportunity to build this new League alongside her. Talia initially refuses Thea's proposal due to her several betrayals but Thea dismisses those as mistakes, making Talia accept her offer. Following the events of the crisis, which saw Oliver sacrifice himself to stop the Anti-Monitor, a new reality is formed in which Thea accepts Roy's marriage proposal and Moira was not killed. When attending Oliver's funeral, Thea and Moira meet Oliver's other half-sister Emiko Adachi where they welcome her into the family.

== Other versions ==
In an alternate reality created by the Legion of Doom with the Spear of Destiny, Thea adores her father instead of hating him.

In the season eight episode "Starling City", it is revealed that Thea's Earth-2 counterpart died upon overdosing on the Vertigo drug. Consumed by Thea's loss, this Earth's Tommy Merlyn becomes Dark Archer and plans revenge on the Glades, where Thea was found dead, by destroying it until Oliver talks him out of it.

== Creation and development ==
In February 2012, it was announced that Willa Holland was joining Arrow as Oliver Queen's "bratty younger sister Thea", beating Melissa Benoist for the part. Although Thea is an original creation for the series, Oliver's nickname for her and later hero persona ("Speedy"), her middle name of Dearden and the alias "Mia" she used during her time at Corto Maltese, are easter egg connections to one of Green Arrow's sidekicks in the comics, Mia Dearden. Thea was significantly absent during the fifth season, and showrunner Marc Guggenheim explained that Holland was only contracted to appear in 14 of the 23 episodes for the season. He later revealed that Holland signed a similar contract for the sixth season, but declined to reveal how many episodes of the season she was contracted to appear in. Holland left the series in 2018 after her contract expired, her final appearance being "The Thanatos Guild". She returned for a guest appearance on the 150th episode "Emerald Archer" in season seven, and as a recurring character for the eighth and final season.

== Reception ==
In 2016, Jason Berman of Screen Rant included Holland in his list of "20 Best Actors in the Arrowverse".
