= Beth Schwartz =

American television writer

- Education: University of Michigan
- Occupation: Television writer
- Years active: 2006–present
- Spouse: Jeff Cassidy

Beth Schwartz is an American television writer. She is known for her work as showrunner on the seventh and eighth season of Arrow, and as a co-showrunner on the Netflix series Sweet Tooth.

== Career ==
She began her career as a production staffer on the J. J. Abrams produced ABC dramedy What About Brian. She later would go on to write an episode ("What About Secret Lovers").

She wrote two episodes of the ABC family drama Brothers & Sisters ("Going Once... Going Twice", "Taking Sides") and one episode of The CW's dramedy/romance Hart of Dixie ("Mistress & Misunderstandings").

=== Arrow ===
In summer 2012, Schwartz joined the writers room for the first year DC Comics CW series Arrow. Schwartz was named executive story editor with the commencement of the series' third season. At the start of the fourth season, she was promoted to co-producer.

In April 2018, it was announced that Schwartz would take over as showrunner for the show's seventh season.

For the eighth and final season, Schwartz served as co-showrunner alongside Marc Guggenheim, making both the senior writers for that series.

=== Legends of Tomorrow ===
Schwartz has also written two episodes for the Arrow spin-off Legends of Tomorrow, as well as serving as a consulting producer on the show.

== Personal life ==
Schwartz is married to director, and former Arrowverse cameraman, Jeff Cassidy.

== Filmography ==
=== Television ===
Year	Title	Credited as			Notes
Year	Title	Writer	Producer	Executive producer	Notes
2007	What About Brian	Yes	No	No	Writer (1 episode)
2008–2009	Brothers & Sisters	Yes	No	No	Writer (2 episodes)
2012	Hart of Dixie	Yes	No	No	Writer (1 episode)
2012–2020	Arrow	Yes	Yes	Yes	Writer (35 episodes), executive story editor (23 episodes), co-producer (23 episodes), co-executive producer (46 episodes), executive producer/showrunner (32 episodes)
2016	Legends of Tomorrow	Yes	Yes	No	Writer (2 episodes), consulting producer (16 episodes)
2021–2024	Sweet Tooth	Yes	No	Yes	Writer (2 episodes), executive producer, co-showrunner
2024	Dead Boy Detectives	Yes	No	Yes	Writer (1 episode), executive producer, co-showrunner
