= James Bamford (stunt coordinator) =

Canadian actor

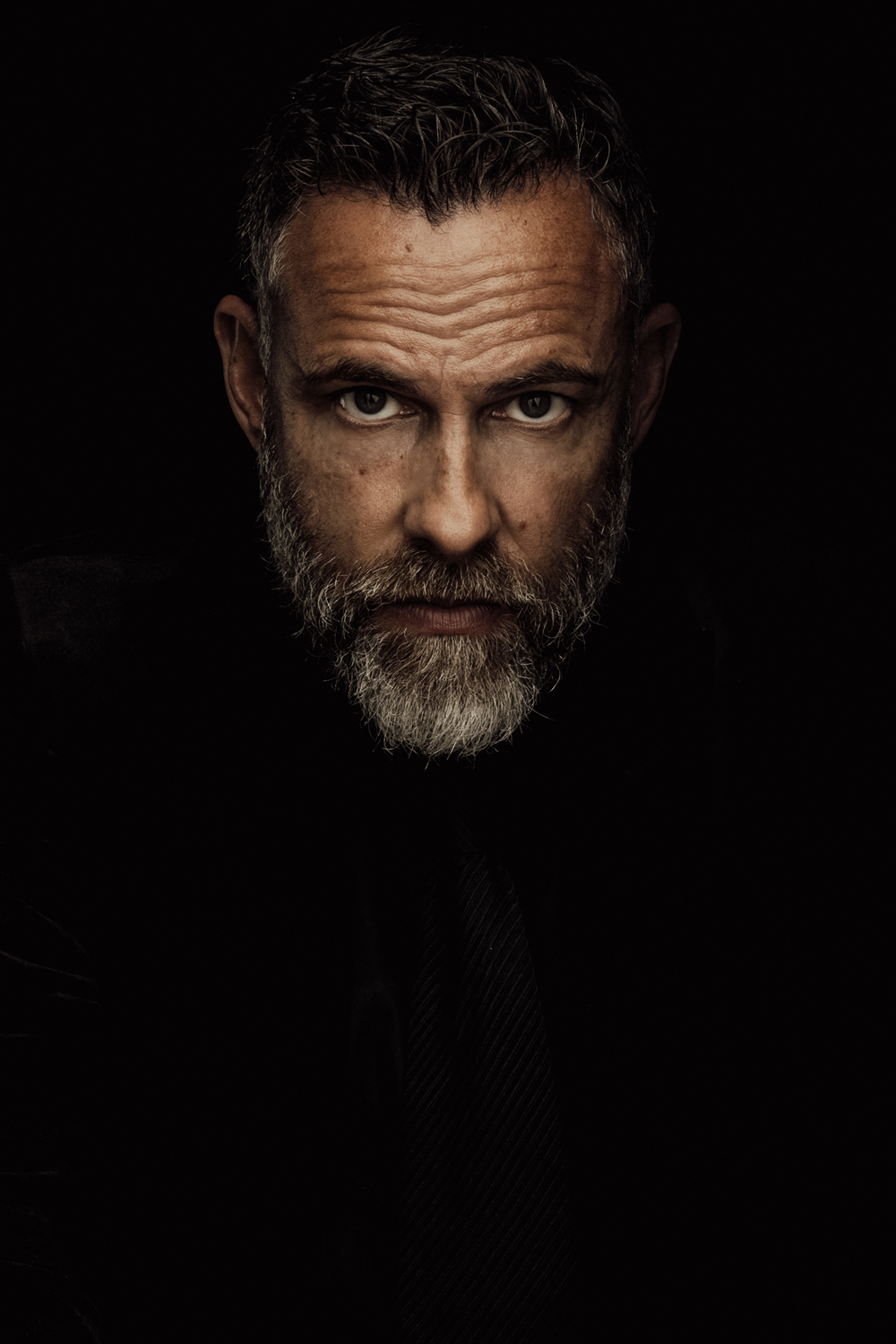
- Promotional photo of James Bamford
- Other names: BamBam, Bam
- Occupations: film director; television director; television producer; stunt coordinator; fight choreographer; stunt performer; stunt double; actor
- Years active: 1990–present

James Bamford, also known by the nickname "BamBam", is a Canadian film & television director, who was the sole "directing producer" of the series Arrow and directed 17 episodes of the series including multiple premieres, season finales, crossovers and the series finale. He started his career in the film and television industry as a stuntman and fight choreographer with his martial arts experience as his entry skill set. He continued on in his career to become a stunt coordinator, 2nd unit director, then director, and directing producer/executive producer.

James Bamford was president and on the executive board of Stunts Canada, an invitation-only organisation for stunt professionals, for three consecutive two-year terms. Stunts Canada is the oldest and largest stunt association in Canada.

== Biography ==
Bamford was born in Victoria, British Columbia, and presently lives and works out of Vancouver, Canada.

== Awards, nominations, medals ==
James Bamford has won two Leo Awards for Stunt Coordination, as well as a nomination in 2010 for Best Stunt Coordination in a Dramatic Series for the Stargate Universe episode "Air". The Leo Awards celebrate excellence in film and television in British Columbia. In 2013, Bamford won the Leo Award for Best Stunt Coordination in a Television Movie for Halo 4: Forward Unto Dawn. In 2016 he, along with colleagues JJ Makaro, Eli Zagoudakis, and Curtis Braconnier, won the Leo Award for Best Stunt Coordination in a Dramatic Series for the Arrow episode, Brotherhood, in which Bamford made his directorial debut. His directing efforts on the Brotherhood episode were also rewarded with a Leo Award nomination for Best Director in a Dramatic Series.

Bamford was a stunt coordinator on the movie Ek Tha Tiger which won Best Action at the Times of India Film Awards in 2013.

While working as a Juvenile Corrections Officer in Victoria, Bamford won a bronze medal for Team Canada for the Karate-Kumite division in the 1991 World Police and Fire Games, in Memphis, USA.

== Career ==
Bamford has been a stunt double for many actors, including Benicio Del Toro, Mickey Rourke and David Duchovny, and worked as a stunt performer and stunt coordinator on TV shows from The X-Files to Arrow, and films including Final Destination, The Chronicles of Riddick and X-Men 2. He is best known for his work on Arrow, and has appeared at many fan conventions in the US, Canada, the UK and Australia including San Diego Comic-Con.

James Bamford appeared as a subject in the 2014 Vancouver Creatives exhibition by Vancouver Biennale (VnB), comprising portraits of 22 creative Vancouverites and sponsored by the magazine Vancouver is Awesome. The photographs were an example of collaborative Calotype photography and James Bamford was selected as a result of a public vote.

== Interviews ==
In 2020, James Bamford was a guest on the Positive Solace podcast with BBC journalist Attika Choudhary

In 2018, Canada's The Globe and Mail profiled James Bamford.

Joseph Mallozzi, producer of Stargate SG-1 and Stargate Atlantis, hosted a Q&A to Bamford on his Wordpress blog in 2008, and called him "the fearless one".

Premiere Scene interviewed Bamford about stunt coordination at the London Film and Comic Con.

Bamford was a presenter at the Leo Awards in 2012.

Next Level Radio interviewed James Bamford, where he says that "a stunt performer has a 100% likelihood of being injured."

DC Entertainment's DC All Access went behind the scenes on the TV show Arrow in April 2014, where James Bamford demonstrates some stunt action.

Bamford was the fight coordinator on the Arrow stunt team, which was hailed by Entertainment Weekly as the Most Likely to Earn Someone an Emmy in their 5th Annual Season Finale Awards, 2014.

== Filmography ==
This is only a small selection of James Bamford's roles, as in June 2014 he had 424 entries at IMDB.

Year	Film	Role
1994	M.A.N.T.I.S.	Stunt performer
1995	Sliders	Stunt performer; Stunt double for Jerry O'Connell
1995	The Outer Limits	Stunt performer
1996	Poltergeist: The Legacy	Stunt coordinator (cover days)
1996	Two	Stunt double for Lochlyn Munro
1997	Dead Man's Gun: My Brother's Keeper	Stunt performer
1997	Nightman	Stunt double Agent Aldrich
1998	Cold Squad	Stunt performer
1998	Welcome to Paradox	Stunt double for Ice-T
1998	Shattered Image	Stunt double for William Baldwin
1998	First Wave	Stunt performer
1999	So Weird	Stunt performer
1999	Behind The Mask	Stunt double for Matthew Fox
1999	Harsh Realm	Stunt double for D. B. Sweeney
1999	The Sentinel	Nick Ray
2000	Final Destination	Stunt performer
2000	Dark Angel	Stunt double for Michael Weatherly; Stunt double for William Gregory Lee
2000	Call of the Wild	Stunt double
2000	Chain of Fools	ER doctor Stunt performer
2001	Smallville	Stunt double
2001	UC: Undercover	Stunt double for William Forsythe
2002	Reign of Fire	Stunt coordinator
2002	John Doe	Stunt performer
2002	The Twilight Zone	Stunt double
2002	Jeremiah	Stunt coordinator (2002–2004 – 34 episodes)
2002	X2	Stunt performer for Hugh Jackman; Remy LeBeau / Gambit (deleted scene)
2003	Scary Movie 3	Stunt performer
2004	Stargate Atlantis	Stunt coordinator (2004–2009 – 99 episodes); Male Wraith orderly Stunt double for Joe Flanigan
2004	The Butterfly Effect	Stunt coordinator Security Guard
2004	Scooby Doo 2: Monsters Unleashed	Martial arts coordinator Stunt actor: Captain Cutler's Ghost
2004	The Chronicles of Riddick	Stunt performer
2004	Blade: Trinity	Stunt performer
2004	Stargate SG-1	Eighth
2004	Scary Movie 4	Stunt actor: soldier
2005	Stargate SG-1	Fight coordinator (2005–2007 – 5 episodes); Stunt performer Stunt double for Ben Browder
2006	X-Men: The Last Stand	Stunt performer
2006	Fallen	Powers Angel
2007	In the Name of the King: A Dungeon Siege Tale	Stunt actor: Legionnaire
2007	Aliens vs. Predator: Requiem	Stunt performer
2007	Fantastic Four: Rise of the Silver Surfer	Stunt performer Stunt driver
2007	Sanctuary	Stunt coordinator (8 episodes)
2007	War	Stunt performer
2007	Things We Lost in the Fire	Stunt performer
2007	A Dog's Breakfast	Stunt coordinator
2008	Flash Gordon	Stunt coordinator Stunt performer
2009	Watchmen	Stunt performer
2009	Rampage	Stunt coordinator
2009	Stargate Universe	Stunt coordinator (2009–2011 – 39 episodes)
2010	Shattered	Stunt performer/double
2011	Mortal Kombat: Legacy	Thug No. 2
2011	Once Upon a Time	The Black Knight
2011	Apollo 18	Stunt coordinator
2012	Ek Tha Tiger	Stunt coordinator
2012	True Justice	Stunt performer Darko Thug No. 8
2012	Halo 4: Forward Unto Dawn	Stunt coordinator
2012	Fringe	Agent Murphy
2012	Alcatraz	White inmate
2012	True Justice	Stunt performer Darko Thug No. 8
2012	Arrow	Fight choreographer (2012 – 7 episodes); Stunt coordinator (2012–2013 – 23 episodes); Fight coordinator (2012–2016 – 38 episodes); Gunman #2 (Pilot episode); Director (2015–2020 – 17 episodes); Supervising stunt coordinator (2016–2017 – 21 episodes); Producer (2017–2020)
2016	Supergirl	Director ("Survivors")
2020	Batwoman	Director ("If You Believe In Me, I Believe In You")
2021	NCIS: Hawaii	Director ("Rescuers")
2024	Air Force One Down	Director
2024	Jade	Director
2024	Utopia	Director
2025	Man with No Past	Director
