= Charlie Barnett (actor) =

American actor (born 1988)

- Born: February 4, 1988 (age 38); Sarasota, Florida, U.S.
- Education: Juilliard School (BFA)
- Occupation: Actor
- Years active: 2006–present

Charlie Barnett (born February 4, 1988) is an American actor. He is known for starring as firefighter/paramedic Peter Mills on the NBC drama Chicago Fire from 2012 to 2015 and Jedi Knight Yord Fandar in the Star Wars television series The Acolyte on Disney+. Among his other starring roles are Alan Zaveri on the Netflix comedy series Russian Doll, Ben Marshall on the Netflix series Tales of the City, and Gabe Miranda in the Netflix thriller series You.

== Early life and education ==
Barnett and his sister were adopted by Bob and Danee Barnett. His adoptive mother is from Utah and is of Swedish descent, while his adoptive father is a boat builder from Minnesota. He was raised on a sailboat near Longboat Key in Florida until he was seven. He discovered theatre when he was six years old and performed in many operas and musicals with the Sarasota Youth Opera. Barnett is a graduate of Booker High School. He participated in the Carnegie Mellon Musical Theater Summer Program. After high school, Barnett attended the Juilliard School, where he graduated from the drama program class of 2010.

== Career ==
For three seasons, from 2012 to 2015, Barnett starred as Peter Mills in the NBC action-drama television series Chicago Fire.

In 2017, he was cast in the role of Ian Porter on The CW series Valor.

In 2018, he was cast in the leading role of Alan Zaveri on the Netflix series Russian Doll. In the same year, Barnett was cast in the main role of Ben Marshall on the Netflix miniseries, Tales of the City.

In 2019, he was cast in the recurring role of Gabe Miranda on the second season of the Netflix thriller You. In July 2019, Barnett joined Arrow for its eighth and final season, portraying John Diggle, Jr. His role was announced at a Comic-Con panel.

== Personal life ==
Barnett realized he was gay at the age of 13. He enjoys sailing, playing Ms. Pac-Man, classic cars, and is a fan of the White Sox and Chicago Bears. He has struggled with alcohol addiction.

While pursuing his career, Barnett has lived in New York City, Salt Lake City, and Chicago. During filming for Chicago Fire, Barnett lived with co-stars Joe Minoso and Yuri Sardarov. He currently resides in Los Angeles.

== Awards ==
- Out Magazine's Out100 Entertainers of the Year list for 2019

== Filmography ==
=== Films ===
Year	Title	Role	Notes
2006	Circus Island	Billy Robarts	
2011	Private Romeo	Ken Lee / Prince Escalus	
2012	Gayby	Daniel	
2012	Men in Black 3	Air Force MP No. 2	
2013	The Happy Sad	Aaron	
2020	The Stand In	Simon	
2022	We Are Gathered Here Today	Max Stone	
2022	Dance Dads	Chris Shuriah	Direct to streaming video release. Also Co-executive Producer.
2024	Dreams in Nightmares	Reece	
2026	Imposters	Paul	

=== Television ===
Year	Title	Role	Notes
2010	Law & Order: Special Victims Unit	Chuck Mills	Episode: "Gray"
2011	Law & Order: Criminal Intent	Dr. Sam Harris	Episode: "Cadaver"
2012–2015	Chicago Fire	Peter Mills	Main role
2013	Apex	Tim	Episode: "Pilot"
2016	Code Black	Brian Godard	Episode: "Life & Limb"
2016	Secrets and Lies	Patrick Warner	Main role
2017	Orange Is the New Black	Wes Driscoll	Episode: "The Reverse Midas Touch"
2017–2018	Valor	Ian Porter	Main role
2019	Tales of the City	Ben Marshall	Main role
2019	Arrow	John Diggle, Jr.	4 episodes
2019	You	Gabe Miranda	Recurring role
2019–2022	Russian Doll	Alan Zaveri	Main role
2021	Special	Harrison	Recurring role
2021	Ordinary Joe	Eric Payne	Main role
2024	The Acolyte	Yord Fandar	Main role
2026	Stuart Fails to Save the Universe	Simpa	2 episodes
2026	Line of Fire	Jack	Main role
