= Joseph David-Jones =

American actor (born 1993)

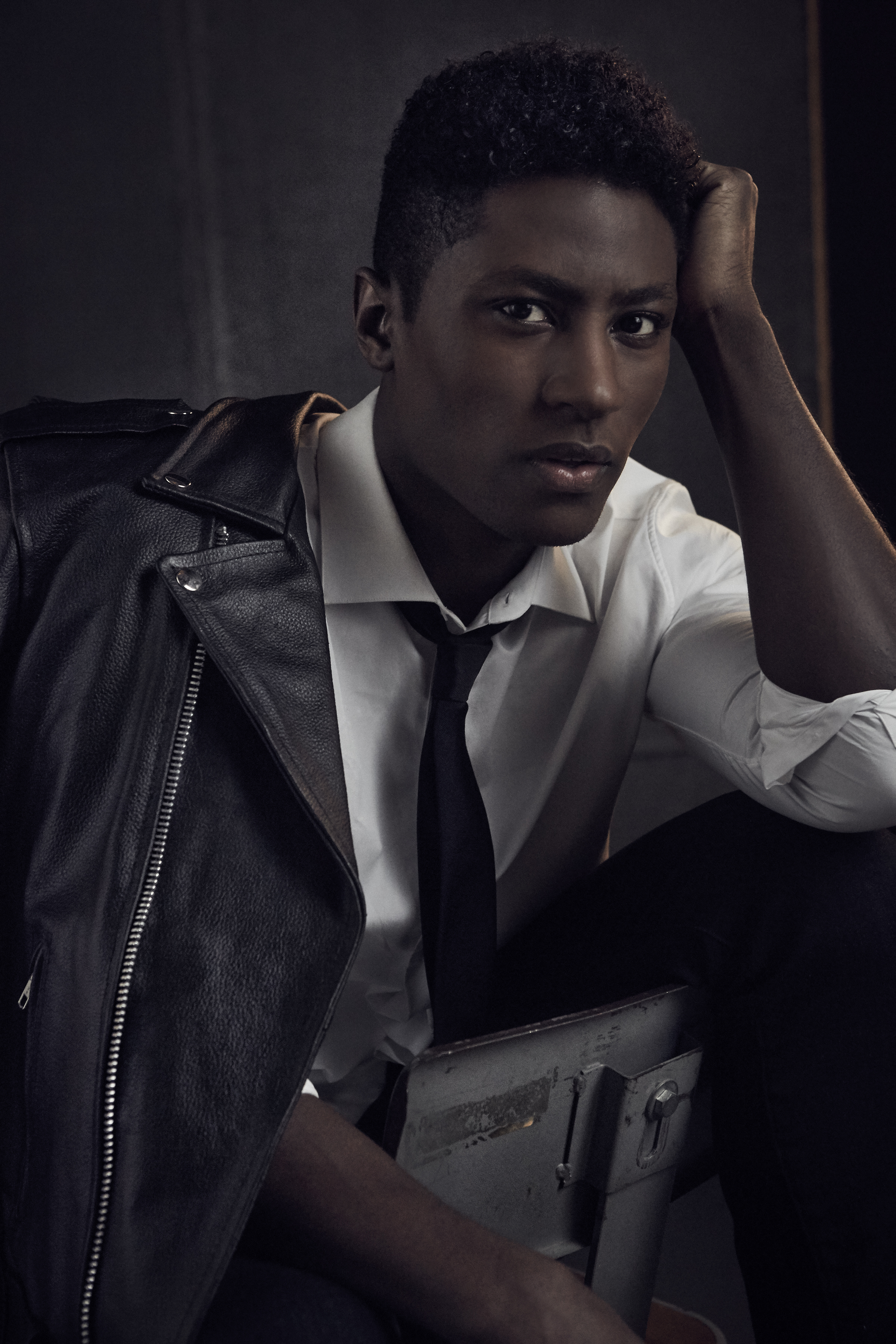
- Born: Joseph David-Jones; December 22, 1993 (age 32); Los Angeles, California, U.S.
- Occupation: Actor
- Years active: 2011–present
- Known for: Arrow

Joseph David-Jones (born December 22, 1993) is an American actor, known for his roles in Nashville and Arrow.

== Early life and career ==
David-Jones was born in 1993, in Los Angeles, and grew up in Florence, Kentucky. He earned a full scholarship to the University of Kentucky where he earned a bachelor's degree in mechanical engineering. While growing up, Jones began modeling with local Kentucky-based brands. During his time in college, he participated in the International Models & Talent competition in New York City. He won the "Actor of the Year" award. Three days later, he returned home and pursued his acting career. In 2016, he played Hollis in The Divergent Series: Allegiant. He also played the role of John Diggle Jr. on The CW series Legends of Tomorrow. Other film roles he was in included films Detroit and Roman J. Israel, Esq.. He reprised the role of Connor Hawke on Arrow. He was upgraded to series regular for the final season.

In 2024, it was announced that David-Jones would portray Jackie Jackson in the 2026 biopic Michael, based on the life and career of Michael Jackson.

== Personal life ==
David-Jones resides in Los Angeles, California. He finds joy filling his downtime with various musical endeavors, playing the guitar and piano. On the charity side, he sponsors and donates to the Save the Children Foundation, which brings support and necessities to children living in underprivileged environments.

== Filmography ==
=== Film ===
Year	Title	Role	Notes
2011	Blackbird	Party Break Dancer	Credited as Jo Jo Jones
2012	Fallback	Mali	Credited as Jo Jo Jones
2013	5th Street	Big Al	Credited as Jo Jo Jones
2014	3 Minutes	C-Dog	
2016	The Divergent Series: Allegiant	Hollis	
2017	Detroit	Morris	
2017	Roman J. Israel, Esq.	Marcus Jones	
2026	Michael	Jackie Jackson	Debut film

=== Television ===
Year	Title	Role	Notes
2011	America's Most Wanted: America Fights Back	Kilo Doss	Episode: "50 Fugitives, 50 States Special Edition"; Credited as Jo Jo Jones
2014	Intelligence	Lance Corporal	Episode: "Red X"
2014	Hysteria	Deante Sanstreet	Episode: "Pilot"
2016	Legends of Tomorrow	John Diggle Jr. / Connor Hawke / Green Arrow (Earth-16)	2 episodes
2017–2018	Nashville	Clayton Carter	14 episodes
2018	Medal of Honor	Jonesy	Episode: "Edward Carter"
2019–2020	Arrow	Connor Hawke	Recurring role (season 7), main role (season 8); 13 episodes
2021–2022	4400	Jharrel Mateo	Main role

== Discography ==
=== Singles ===
List of singles, with selected chart positions, showing year released, certifications and album name
Title	Year	Peak chart positions										Certifications	Album		
Title	Year	"Yippe Ki Yay"	2024	—	—	—	—	—	—	—	—	Certifications	Album	—	Non-album single
"Castles in The Sky"	2025	—	—	—	—	—	—	—	—	—			Non-album single		

=== Music videos ===
Title	Year	Director(s)
"Yippe Ki Yay"	2024	
"Castles in The Sky"	2025	
