= Audrey Marie Anderson =

American actress and model

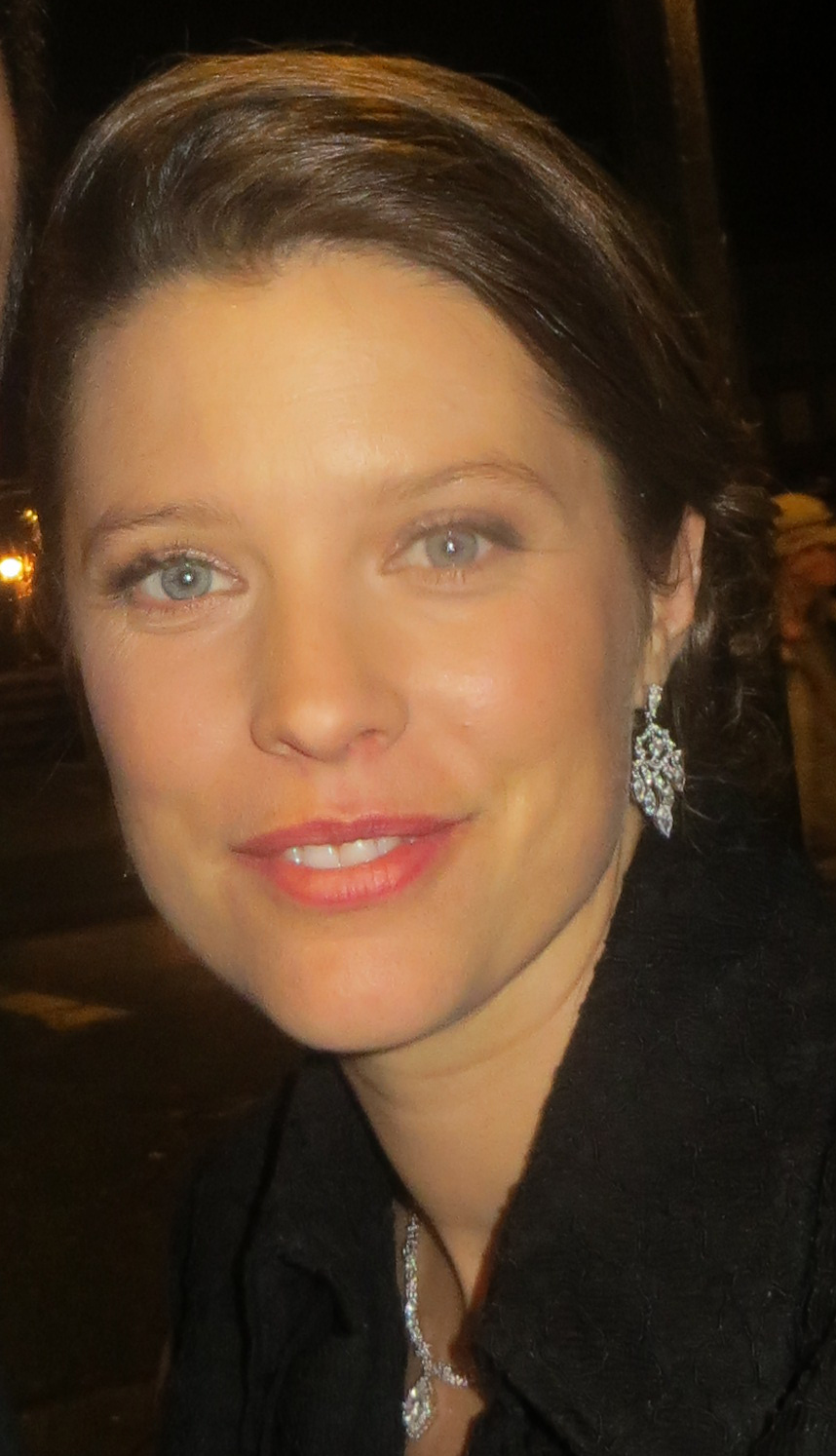
- Audrey Marie Anderson on the set of Arrow, January 2015
- Born: March 7, 1975 (age 51); Fort Worth, Texas, U.S.
- Occupations: Actress, model
- Years active: 1994–present

Audrey Marie Anderson (born March 7, 1975) is an American actress and model. She is best known for her role as Kim Brown in the CBS action-drama series The Unit (2006–2009) and her recurring roles as DC character Lyla Michaels / Harbinger in the Arrowverse, primarily Arrow (2013–2020), and Lilly in The Walking Dead (2013).

== Career ==
After graduating from Barbizon Modeling and Acting School in Fort Worth, Texas, Anderson began a modeling career in the early 1990s, appearing in advertisements for brands such as Armani, Gap, Biotherm, Target, and American Eagle Outfitters, before taking a recurring role in the ABC television drama series Once and Again.

She is best known for portraying Kim Brown on the CBS television series The Unit (2006–2009). She also appeared in the series Still Life and Going to California and guest-starred on Without a Trace, NCIS: Los Angeles, Private Practice, and House. Her film credits include Drop Dead Sexy, Moonlight Mile, and Least Among Saints..

In 2013, she began a recurring role on Arrow as Lyla Michaels, the wife of John Diggle. In the show's final season, the character officially became Harbinger in time for the “Crisis on Infinite Earths” event. Also in 2013, she appeared in the role of Lilly on The Walking Dead.

In 2022, she was a part of The Winchesters episode "Art of Dying" (season 1 episode 6).

== Filmography ==
=== Film ===
Year	Title	Role	Notes
2002	The Badge	Teenage Waitress	
2002	Moonlight Mile	Audrey Anders	
2003	A Painted House	Tally Spruill	Television film
2004	Larceny	Punk Girl	
2005	Drop Dead Sexy	Natalie	
2006	Beerfest	Giddy Girl	
2012	Least Among Saints	Jenny	
2014	Mockingbird	Emmy	

=== Television ===
Year	Title	Role	Notes
1994	Beverly Hills, 90210	Officer	Episode: "Cuffs and Links"
1995	Law & Order	Mrs. Barnett	Episode: "Pride"
2000–2001	Once and Again	Carla Aldrich	10 episodes
2001–2002	Going to California	Claire Connor	3 episodes
2002	Providence	Angela	3 episodes
2003–2004	Still Life	Emily Morgan	5 episodes
2004	Without a Trace	Colleen McGrath	2 episodes
2005	Halley's Comet	Halley Newell	Pilot
2005–2006	Point Pleasant	Isabelle Kramer	4 episodes
2006–2009	The Unit	Kim Brown	69 episodes
2010	NCIS: Los Angeles	Kristin Donnelly	Episode: "Past Lives"
2010	Lie to Me	Dr. Mary Hanson	Episode: "In the Red"
2012	Private Practice	Rose Filmore	Episode: "Are You My Mother?"
2012	House	Emily Koppelman	Episode: "Nobody's Fault"
2013	Touch	Mallory Kane	Episode: "Enemy of My Enemy"
2013	The Walking Dead	Lilly Chambler	3 episodes
2013–2020	Arrow	Lyla Michaels / Harbinger	40 episodes
2014	Olive Kitteridge	Ann	HBO miniseries; episode "Security"
2015	Castle	Aubrey Haskins	Episode 7x13: "I, Witness"
2015	Minority Report	Gabby Stanton	Episode: "Fiddler's Neck"
2016	Mad Dogs	Tabatha	Episode: "Ice Cream"
2016–2018	Ice	Ava Pierce	20 episodes
2016–2019	The Flash	Lyla Michaels / Harbinger	5 episodes
2019	Supergirl	Lyla Michaels / Harbinger	Episode: "Crisis on Infinite Earths, Part 1"
2019	Batwoman	Lyla Michaels / Harbinger	Episode: "Crisis on Infinite Earths, Part 2"
2020	Legends of Tomorrow	Lyla Michaels / Harbinger	Episode: "Crisis on Infinite Earths, Part 5"
2020	Tommy	Woman from Michigan	Episode: "In Dreams Begin Responsibility"
2023	The Rookie	Doctor	Episode: "Death Notice"
2023	The Winchesters	Tracy Gellar	Episode: "Art of Dying"
2023	Perry Mason	Agnes Holcomb	Season 2
