= Juliana Harkavy =

American actress

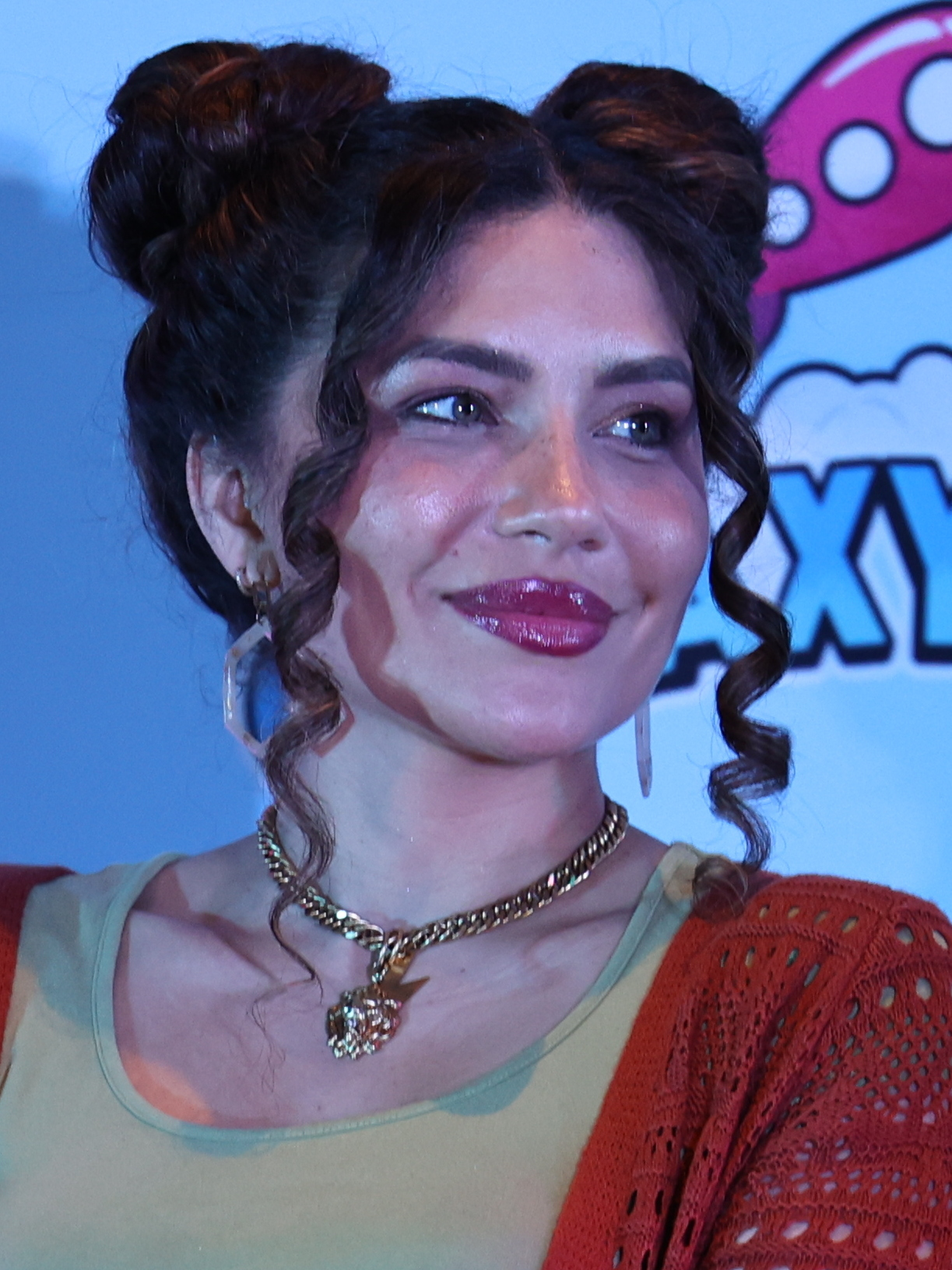
- Juliana Harkavy in 2023
- Born: Juliana Jay Harkavy; January 1, 1985 (age 41); New York City, US
- Occupation: Actress
- Years active: 1996–present
- Notable work: Arrow
- Spouse: Alexander Meimand (m. 2021)
- Children: 1

Juliana Jay Harkavy (born January 1, 1985) is an American actress. She is known for portraying Rebecca in Dolphin Tale, Jessie in To Write Love on Her Arms, and Alisha in the television series The Walking Dead. Her roles include a starring role in the horror film Last Shift, and a reprise of her role as Rebecca in Dolphin Tale 2. She was a series regular on The CW superhero series Arrow, portraying Dinah Drake / Black Canary.

== Early life ==
Harkavy was born in New York City. She is the daughter of Berta Carela, an immigrant from the Dominican Republic and Michael Harkavy, who is the former Senior Vice president of Warner Bros. Entertainment Worldwide Publishing, Kids' WB Music, and Warner Bros. Interactive Entertainment. Her professional acting career began when she was 10 years old. Harkavy has described herself as "a Dominican Jew".

Harkavy trained at the Young Actors Space in Sherman Oaks, California, for nine years. She attended her first year of high school at Le Lycée Français de Los Angeles, where she became fluent in French, and did part of her schooling in the South of France. She earned her high school diploma from the Milken Community High School in Los Angeles, California. After high school, Harkavy attended The Tisch School of the Arts at New York University, where she majored in Theater in the Sanford Meisner studio.

== Career ==
Harkavy's first acting job was at age 10 in a commercial for the Fox Kids series Goosebumps, based on the popular horror-book series. Her first role in a major motion picture was an uncredited role in the 1995 version of A Little Princess, directed by Alfonso Cuarón.

Harkavy starred in the 2011 film If You Only Knew about early-onset Alzheimer's disease. She stars as Jessica Loren in the horror film Last Shift.

Harkavy starred in the 2010 short film Whatever Lola Wants. Nominated for a Best Actress Award at the 2011 University of Miami Canes Film Festival Harkavy is the star in the short film The Lost Doll directed by James Walhberg.

Harkavy plays Alisha, a survivor involved with the Governor on The Walking Dead. She appeared in two episodes: "Dead Weight" and "Too Far Gone".

In 2016 she was cast in the fifth season of the CW show Arrow, in the recurring role of Detective Tina Boland, whose true name is revealed to be Dinah Drake, acting as the new Black Canary. She was promoted to series regular for the show's sixth season, which began airing in the fall of 2017.

== Personal life ==
She has lived in New York, New Mexico, New Jersey, California, Florida, and France. On June 13, 2020, Harkavy announced that she was engaged to professional Setar player Alexander Meimand. They married on October 10, 2021. She gave birth to their son, Cyrus Akiva Meimand, in April 2026.

== Filmography ==
=== Film ===
Year	Title	Role	Notes
1995	A Little Princess	Girl in India	
2005	Flushed	Groupie	Short
2006	Love is Blind	Crystal	
2006	My Super Ex-Girlfriend	Passerby	
2010	Whatever Lola Wants	Lola	Short movie, nominated for Best Actress Award at UM Canes film festival.
2011	Dolphin Tale	Rebecca	
2011	If You Only Knew	Louise	
2012	A Feeling from Within	Stacey	
2013	Finding Joy	Pretty Young Woman	
2013	House of Bodies	Tisha	
2013	Marriage Material	Madeline	
2014	Dolphin Tale 2	Rebecca	
2014	Last Shift	Officer Jessica Loren	
2015	To Write Love on Her Arms	Jessie	Filmed in 2011, released in 2015

=== Television ===
Year	Title	Role	Notes
2010	The Glades	Amy	Episode: "Doppelganger"
2011	Big Mike	Janette Ogilvy	TV movie
2013	Graceland	Alex	Episode: "Heat Run"
2013	The Walking Dead	Alisha	Episodes: "Dead Weight", "Too Far Gone"
2014	Constantine	Sarah	Episode: "Blessed are the Damned"
2016	Below the Surface	Kelly	TV movie
2017–2020	Arrow	Dinah Drake / Black Canary	Recurring role (Season 5); Main role (Season 6–8)
2017	The Flash	Dinah Drake / Black Canary	Episode: "Crisis on Earth-X, Part 3"
2017, 2020	Legends of Tomorrow	Dinah Drake / Black Canary	Episodes: "Crisis on Earth-X, Part 4", "Crisis on Infinite Earths, Part 5"
