= Ben Lewis (Canadian actor) =

Canadian actor (born 1985)

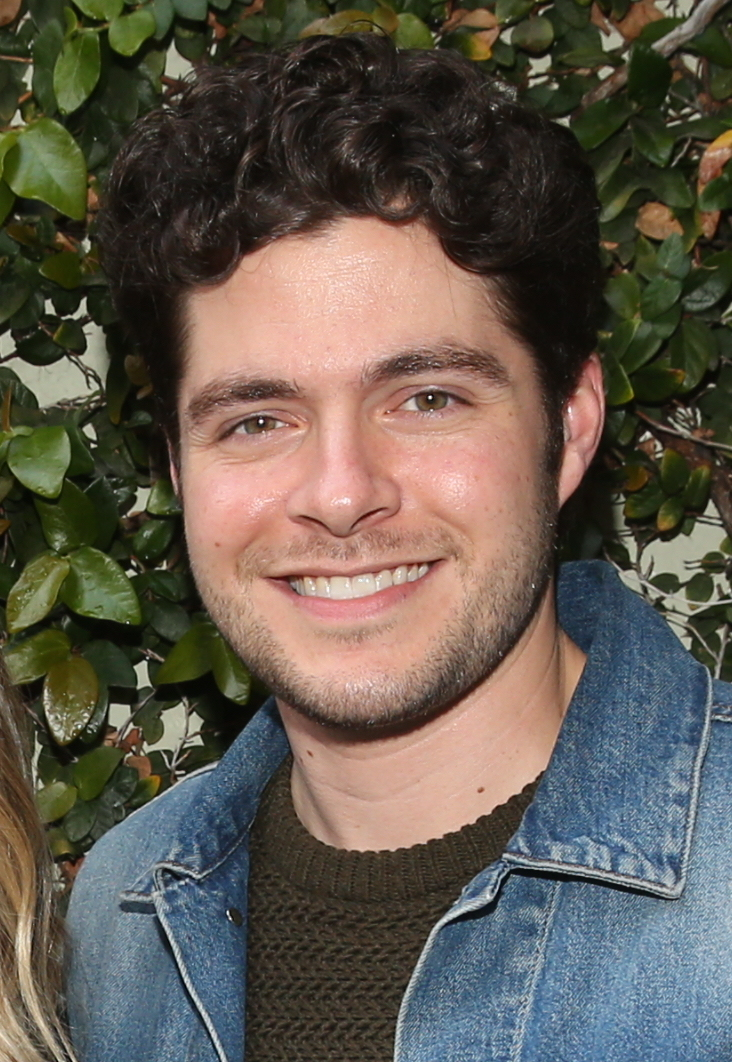
- Lewis in 2018
- Born: September 30, 1985 (age 40); Toronto, Ontario, Canada
- Occupation: Actor
- Spouse: Blake Lee (m. 2016)

Ben Lewis (born September 30, 1985) is a Canadian actor known for his role as the adult version of William Clayton in the last two seasons of Arrow. He also played Other Scott in Scott Pilgrim vs. the World and Bobby Beckonridge in Degrassi: The Next Generation.

== Early life, family and education ==
Lewis is a graduate of the National Theatre School of Canada.

== Career ==
One of his earliest roles was in a guest starring role as Teddy Jones Jr., a ranch hand who kills his father's murderers, on Murdoch Mysteries in 2009,

Lewis played Bobby Beckonridge in the tenth season of Degrassi: The Next Generation, which he acknowledged was one of the biggest roles of his career up to that point. He recounted that he had auditioned for the Canadian rite-of-passage show several times without success, and that he had not been invited to the first round of auditions for Bobby because they had been looking for a younger actor, getting the chance to audition when they didn't find anyone. Bobby is an abusive boyfriend with some personal baggage, and Lewis said that co-star Annie Clark, who played Bobby's girlfriend Fiona, was the key to helping him perform this.

In Scott Pilgrim vs. the World, Lewis played Other Scott, the boyfriend of Scott Pilgrim's roommate Wallace Wells. Jeff Bayer's review of the film in The Scorecard Review gave the cast of the film 10/10, noting that "Scott's bandmates are even better. Alison Pill, who you may remember from Milk and Ben Lewis as the other Scott, steal every moment they are on screen. It's just an amazing cast of characters that support this film". Lewis tweeted that "[Scott Pilgrim] profoundly changed my life. [Edgar Wright] seeing fit to include me in this cast was an honour & the greatest vote of confidence a young actor could've asked for."

Lewis subsequently landed television roles in Designated Survivor, The Handmaid's Tale, Chasing Life and Suits. In 2018 he joined the DC Comics superhero television show Arrow in its seventh season as the recurring character William Clayton, and became a main character for the eighth and final season. Lewis' William is an adult version of the Arrow's son, portrayed as a child by Jack Moore, who appears in a future timeline.

In 2019 he finished filming a role for the movie The High Note. During the COVID-19 pandemic, Lewis joined the website Cameo to raise money for charities. He has also written and directed short films, including Apart from Everything and Zero Recognition, and wrote for the web series This Week Had Me Like.

In 2020 Lewis starred opposite his real-life husband Blake Lee in the romantic comedy television film The Christmas Setup.

== Personal life ==
Lewis is openly gay, and came out to his parents when he was seventeen. He is married to actor Blake Lee, whom he met in the Grauman's Chinese Theatre bathroom at the Scott Pilgrim vs. the World premiere after being told they had mutual friends. Lee had been attending as Aubrey Plaza's friend. Lewis and Lee began a long-distance relationship between Los Angeles and Toronto. They have a dog, Todd.

Lewis has publicly criticized the Marvel Cinematic Universe for not casting LGBT+ actors; in a 2019 interview with Attitude he said, "How many fucking Avengers are there at this point, and not one gay actor in the bunch." Attitude noted that Lewis overlooked Tessa Thompson, a queer actress who plays the bisexual Avenger Valkyrie, in his comments. In the same interview, Lewis praised the Arrow producers for "[giving] more out actors [...] a platform to succeed". His Arrow character was given a coming-out scene after Lewis specifically requested they write it into the show. In relation to Lewis' character coming out, magazine Out also lamented that the DC Extended Universe only had one queer character.

== Filmography ==
=== Film ===
Year	Title	Role	Notes
2008	Toronto Stories	Junkie	
2010	The Shrine	Eric Taylor	
2010	Scott Pilgrim vs. the World	Other Scott	
2014	Don't Get Killed in Alaska	Dan	
2014	Pompeii	Fulvius Fronto	(uncredited)
2020	The High Note	Chad	

=== TV ===
Year	Title	Role	Notes
2006	The House Next Door	Pizza Boy	(TV Movie)
2007	Stir of Echoes: The Homecoming	Max Cogan	(TV Movie)
2008	The Russell Girl	Jon Morrissey	(TV Movie)
2009	Murdoch Mysteries	Teddy Jones Jr.	(TV Series), 1 episode: "Mild Mild West"
2010	Aaron Stone	Conner Sullivan	(TV Series), 1 episode: "Run Aaron, Run"
2010	Lost Girl	Liam	(TV Series), 1 episode: "Fae Day"
2010	Unnatural History	Tramm Van Horn	(TV Series), 1 episode: "Maximum Insecurity"
2010-2011	Degrassi: The Next Generation	Bobby Beckonridge	(TV Series), 6 episodes
2011	InSecurity	Noah Johansson	(TV Series), 1 episode: "Spies of a Certain Age"
2011	Suits	Seth Keller	(TV Series), 3 episodes: "Dirty Little Secrets", "Tricks of the Trade" and "The Shelf Life"
2012	Beauty and the Beast	Peter Hollingsworth	(TV Series), 1 episode: "Out of Control"
2013	Long Story, Short (TV Series)	Greg Power	(TV Series), 2 episodes: "Crutches" and "Reality Sucks"
2014	Reign	Father Benoit	(TV Series), 1 episode: "The Prince of the Blood"
2015	Chasing Life	Josh	(TV Series), 5 episodes
2016	Designated Survivor	Carter	(TV Series), 1 episode: "The Enemy"
2017	The Handmaid's Tale	Peter	(TV Series), 1 episode: "The Other Side"
2018	Insecure	Cody	(TV Series), 1 episode: "Familiar-Like"
2018	Ransom	Brian Smith	(TV Series), 1 episode: "Secrets and Spies"
2018	Wisdom of the Crowd	Joel	(TV Series), 1 episode: "The Tipping Point"
2018-2020	Arrow	Adult William Clayton	(TV Series), 20 episodes
2020	The Christmas Setup	Hugo Spencer	(TV Movie)
TBA	Married with Friends	Bo	Main role
