= Kapiushon =

- Arrow episode
- Episode no.: Season 5 Episode 17
- Directed by: Kevin Tancharoen
- Written by: Brian Ford Sullivan; Emilio Ortega Aldrich
- Cinematography by: Gordon Verheul
- Editing by: Jessie Murray
- Production code: T27.13217
- Original air date: March 22, 2017

Guest appearances
- John Barrowman as Malcolm Merlyn (special appearance by); Madison McLaughlin as Evelyn Sharp; David Meunier as Ishmael Gregor; Mike Dopud as Viktor; David Nykl as Anatoly Knyazev; Dolph Lundgren as Konstantin Kovar

Episode chronology
← Previous "Checkmate"	Next → "Disbanded"
- Arrow season 5

"Kapiushon" is the seventeenth episode of the fifth season of Arrow. The episode features Oliver Queen being tortured by main villain Adrian Chase after being captured in the previous episode. Malcolm Merlyn and Evelyn Sharp return in this episode. The episode received acclaim from critics and has been dubbed the best episode of the season. The episode is notable in the fact it is primarily a flashback episode and primarily only features Oliver Queen and Adrian Chase while having minor roles from Evelyn Sharp, John Diggle, Curtis Holt, and Felicity Smoak.

== Plot ==
In Russia, Oliver Queen helps Anatoly Knyazev defeat Ishmael Gregor and his promotion to captain of the Bratva. When Anatoly meets with Konstantin Kovar he also meets Malcolm Merlyn. Kovar buys sarin gas from Malcolm. Anatoly learns that Kovar is planning a coup against the Russian government. By torturing an operative of Kovar, Oliver learns that Kovar has invited key government officials to his casino, where he plans to assassinate all of them by the gas. Oliver convinces Galina Venediktov, the mother of Taiana and Vlad Venediktov, to give him her key card to the casino. Oliver and the Bratva infiltrate the casino, where Kovar learns about Galina's betrayal and kills her, angering Oliver, who fails to stop the spread of the gas in time, leading to Viktor's death. Anatoly fails to persuade Oliver from killing Kovar. Oliver then receives his Bratva tattoo, while Anatoly proceeds to appoint him as a Bratva captain. Meanwhile, Malcolm helps Kovar's operatives revive him.

Five years later, after being captured by Adrian Chase, Oliver finds himself being tortured over his many kills. Chase tries unleashing the killer in Oliver by putting Evelyn Sharp in the cage with him. Oliver tries to appeal to Evelyn but fails and when Chase returns, he snaps Evelyn's neck. During Chase's torture, Oliver finally admits that he killed because he wanted to and liked it. Evelyn gets up having faked her death, remarking she knew he would break just like Chase said. Chase then burns Oliver's Bratva tattoo and releases him. Oliver returns to the bunker and informs John Diggle, Felicity Smoak and Curtis Holt that he is disbanding Team Arrow.

== Production ==
The episode was originally called "Kapot" as shown in a tweet where Arrow co-creator Marc Guggenheim announced that shooting for the episode began on January 30, 2017. Madison McLaughlin returned after a seven episode hiatus in this episode as her character Evelyn Sharp. Dolph Lundgren also made a return in this episode as the main flashback villain Kovar. Main cast members Willa Holland and Paul Blackthorne (Thea Queen and Quentin Lance respectively) do not appear in this episode. Guggenheim mentioned that Holland was only contracted for 14 of the 23 episodes of the season which would explain her absence in this episode. John Barrowman also made a return as his character, Malcolm Merlyn in this episode since his appearance in "Invasion!".

== Reception ==
=== Ratings ===
In the United States the episode received a 0.5/2 percent share among adults between the ages of 18 and 49, meaning that it was seen by 0.5 percent of all households, and 2 percent of all of those watching television at the time of the broadcast. It was watched by 1.38 million viewers. With Live+7 DVR viewing factored in, the episode had an overall rating of 2.33 million viewers, and a 0.9 in the 18–49 demographic.

=== Critical response ===
Alasdair Wilkins of The A.V. Club wrote "At various points tonight, I was convinced I was watching either the best or the worst episode in Arrow history. If absolutely nothing else, that's proof of audacity, as a show doesn't flirt with such dizzying heights or such self-destructive lows by playing it safe. "Kapiushon" ends up somewhere between those two extremes, though I would place it closer to all-time best than all-time worst. Prometheus' efforts to extract the confession from Oliver take Arrow into the darkest territory we have witnessed, yet even Adrian Chase's (or Simon Morrison's, or whatever we're calling him) most brutal schemes can't compete with what Oliver gets up to in Russia" Wilkins also stated "the basic point is that "Kapiushon" represents a logical endpoint for all the stories Arrow has told up to this point: the season-long battle between the Green Arrow and Prometheus, the concurrent exploration of Oliver's time in Russia, the five-year evolution from the Hood to the Green Arrow, and the gradual transformation of Oliver Queen during his missing years."

Jesse Schedeen of IGN wrote "Maybe the best that can be said for "Kapiushon" is that it felt like it could easily have been the finale to Season 5. We had Ollie captured and at the mercy of Adrian Chase. The season—long dilemma over whether the Green Arrow should kill was brought to a head. And after far too many weeks of heel-dragging, the Russian flashback storyline leapt forward as Dolph Lundgren's Konstantin Kovar finally returned to the fold. A very eventful week, all in all." He also added about Amell and Segarra's performances "Above all, "Kapiushon" succeeded on the strength of Stephen Amell and Josh Segarra's performances. Segarra has been on fire all season long, but especially these past two weeks as the mask has been cast aside and the true face of Adrian Chase has been revealed." Schedeen finished his review by saying "Arrow went very dark in this episode, thriving on two terrific performances from Stephen Amell and Josh Segarra. The Russian flashbacks also received a much-needed jolt of adrenaline here. "Kapiushon" could almost have served as a proper, if very depressing, finale to Season 5. Luckily, there are still several more weeks of darkness and despair to come for Team Arrow."

ScreenCrush wrote about the episode "Stephen Amell certainly had a hell of a time playing those pained realizations, as well as Oliver's broken disdain in the final scene. "Kapiushon" was basically Arrow by way of the Saw bathroom, or a stage play, and there was incredible range on display between Oliver regretfully batting Evelyn away, or screaming in Josh Segarra's face like that." Kayti Burt of Collider wrote "If you had told me at this time last year that the best episode of Arrow Season 5 would be a flashback-heavy one, I would have laughed in your face. "Kapishuon" proved me wrong by giving us a thematically-resonant episode that made Oliver — and the audience — face the stark darkness in his crusade without the rose-tinted glasses." Nora Dominick said "After five years of explosions and harrowing stunts, Arrow delivers a character driven episode that maybe one of the series best hours." Sara Netzely of Entertainment Weekly wrote "Now this was an episode of Arrow. Bravo to Stephen Amell for tonight's fearless, haunting performance of Oliver at his darkest, most shocking low"
