= Arrow season 5 =

Arrow
- Season 5
- Home media cover
- Showrunners: Wendy Mericle; Marc Guggenheim
- Starring: Stephen Amell; David Ramsey; Willa Holland; Emily Bett Rickards; Echo Kellum; Josh Segarra; Paul Blackthorne
- No. of episodes: 23

Release
- Original network: The CW
- Original release: October 5, 2016 – May 24, 2017

Season chronology
- ← Previous; Season 4 Next → Season 6

The fifth season of the American television series Arrow premiered on The CW on October 5, 2016, and concluded on May 24, 2017, with a total of 23 episodes. The series is based on the DC Comics character Green Arrow, a costumed crime-fighter created by Mort Weisinger and George Papp, and is set in the Arrowverse, sharing continuity with other Arrowverse television series. The showrunners for this season were Marc Guggenheim and Wendy Mericle. Stephen Amell stars as Oliver Queen, with principal cast members David Ramsey as John Diggle, Willa Holland as Thea Queen, Emily Bett Rickards as Felicity Smoak, and Paul Blackthorne as Quentin Lance also returning from previous seasons. They are joined by Echo Kellum as Curtis Holt, who was promoted to a series regular from his recurring status in the previous season, and new cast member Josh Segarra.

The series follows billionaire playboy Oliver Queen (Stephen Amell), who claimed to have spent five years shipwrecked on Lian Yu, a mysterious island in the North China Sea, before returning home to Starling City (later renamed "Star City") to fight crime and corruption as a secret vigilante whose weapon of choice is a bow and arrow. In the fifth season, Oliver trains a new group of vigilantes consisting of Rene Ramirez / Wild Dog (Rick Gonzalez), Curtis Holt / Mister Terrific, Evelyn Sharp / Artemis (Madison McLaughlin), and Rory Regan / Ragman (Joe Dinicol) to join his war on crime following Laurel Lance's death and Diggle and Thea's resignation. He also recruits a new Black Canary; former police detective Dinah Drake (Juliana Harkavy). Oliver tries to balance vigilantism with his new role as mayor, yet is threatened by the mysterious and deadly Prometheus (Josh Segarra) who has a connection to Oliver's past. Oliver is also forced to contend with Prometheus' ally Black Siren (Katie Cassidy), an Earth-2 criminal doppelganger of Laurel. The season features flashbacks to Oliver's fifth year since he was presumed dead, where he joins the Bratva in Russia as part of a plot to assassinate Konstantin Kovar (Dolph Lundgren). There, he meets and is trained by Talia al Ghul (Lexa Doig), as a hooded archer, before returning to Lian Yu.

The series was renewed for its fifth season on March 11, 2016, and filming began in Vancouver, British Columbia, Canada on July 5, 2016, and ended in April 2017. The season received positive reviews from critics who viewed it as an improvement over the third and fourth seasons. This season includes the third annual Arrowverse crossover with TV series The Flash and new spin-off Legends of Tomorrow, and also features Kara Danvers / Supergirl from Supergirl. The season was released on DVD and Blu-ray on September 18 and 19, 2017. The series was renewed for a sixth season on January 8, 2017.

== Episodes ==
Arrow season 5 episodes
No. overall	No. in season	Title	Directed by	Written by	Original release date	Prod. code	U.S. viewers (millions)
93	1	"Legacy"	James Bamford	Story by : Greg Berlanti; Teleplay by : Marc Guggenheim & Wendy Mericle	October 5, 2016	T27.13201	1.87
Five months after the death of Damien Darhk, Oliver Queen is distracted from his new duties as mayor due to continuing as Green Arrow alone as his old team members having gone their separate ways. He is encouraged by Felicity Smoak to build a new team by recruiting the amateur vigilantes now working in Star City, like Rene Ramirez. A new criminal crew appears, headed by Tobias Church, and kidnaps Oliver in a bid to draw out and kill the Green Arrow, thereby taking over the city. He is rescued by Thea Queen, but she permanently quits the team after seeing that Oliver is again willing to kill. Church escapes from the Green Arrow and a team of several police officers, then later unites all the organized crime cartels and street gangs under his leadership. Oliver finally agrees to form a new team and includes Curtis Holt at his request. Elsewhere, a mysterious hooded figure in black kills a policeman in cold blood. In a flashback, Oliver encounters his old friend Anatoly Knyazev in Russia. Anatoly agrees to help him kill Konstantin Kovar, the tyrant running Taiana Venediktov's village, by initiating him to the Bratva, the only group that can possibly defeat Kovar.
94	2	"The Recruits"	James Bamford	Speed Weed & Beth Schwartz	October 12, 2016	T27.13202	1.94
Green Arrow recruits Rene, Evelyn Sharp, and Curtis and begins training them using an exercise from his Bratva initiation, revealed through flashbacks. As mayor, Oliver arranges to have AmerTek provide free medical care for Star City's disenfranchised at a special clinic. A new metahuman, "Ragman", appears and starts attacking AmerTek executives. The recruits leave Green Arrow because they do not trust him. Thea discovers that AmerTek CEO Janet Carroll is working with Church, and Felicity learns that it was AmerTek's nuclear missiles that Damien Darhk used to try and destroy the world. Ragman and Green Arrow stop an arms buy between Carroll and Church. Ragman later reveals that he was the only survivor of the Havenrock bombing. Green Arrow convinces him to put aside vengeance and join his team. Later, Oliver reveals his identity to the other recruits as a sign of trust and they agree to rejoin the team. Thea decides to appoint Quentin Lance as Deputy Mayor. Church is attacked by the mysterious archer who calls himself "Prometheus", who wants to personally kill Green Arrow. Meanwhile, John Diggle, back in the Army and on a covert operation, is ambushed by his superior, who plans to sell a nuclear trigger and frame him.
95	3	"A Matter of Trust"	Gregory Smith	Ben Sokolowski & Emilio Ortega Aldrich	October 19, 2016	T27.13203	1.79
Green Arrow investigates a new drug, "Stardust", but still believes his team is not ready for the streets. While he is being informed about Prometheus, Rene and Evelyn secretly raid Stardust dealer Derek Sampson's warehouse. The raid goes wrong and Sampson ends up with superhuman strength and an inability to feel pain. Oliver learns what happened from District Attorney Adrian Chase, convincing him that he still cannot trust his recruits. Felicity advises him to accept the recruits as they are and Green Arrow finally uses his new team to stop Sampson from creating more superhumans. Oliver also publicly endorses Thea's decision to appoint Quentin as Deputy Mayor after negative news stories almost cause her to resign. Felicity admits to Rory Regan (Ragman) that she was the one responsible for Havenrock. Diggle is incarcerated and hallucinates Floyd Lawton as his cellmate due to guilt over killing his brother, Andy. Afterward, he tells Lyla Michaels that he will not fight the charges against him, so she asks Oliver to help her break Diggle out of prison. Flashbacks focus on Anatoly teaching Oliver the need to trust his brothers in the Bratva.
96	4	"Penance"	Dermott Downs	Brian Ford Sullivan & Oscar Balderrama	October 26, 2016	T27.13204	1.87
Oliver's team captures an associate of Church's and delivers him and his loot to the Star City Police Department (SCPD). Afterward, Rory formally leaves the team, saying that he cannot work with Felicity. Oliver leaves Star City to help Lyla break Diggle out of prison over Felicity and the team's objections. Quentin and Chase personally deliver the evidence to the SCPD, which turns out to be a disguised bomb. The explosion allows Church's group to break in and steal weapons from evidence. Oliver infiltrates a federal prison and locates Diggle, who agrees to escape to safeguard Oliver. Oliver takes him and Lyla to a H.I.V.E. safe house. Felicity attempts to reconcile matters with Rory. She and the team determine that Church is planning an assault on the SCPD's anti-crime unit, where Chase is interrogating Church's man. Rory rejoins the team and they help everyone inside escape the attack. However, Curtis is injured and Church captures Rene, intending to torture him to death. Oliver returns and vows to rescue Rene, while Chase decides to trust the vigilantes' motives. In flashbacks, Anatoly tasks Oliver with gaining information from, and then killing, an associate of Kovar. Oliver completes the assignment and Anatoly welcomes him into the Bratva.
97	5	"Human Target"	Laura Belsey	Oscar Balderrama & Sarah Tarkoff	November 2, 2016	T27.13205	1.61
Oliver rescues Rene, who tells him that he gave up Green Arrow's true identity to Church. Church plans to kill Oliver as the Mayor instead of as the vigilante. Diggle rejoins the team and suggests that bodyguard Christopher Chance, the "Human Target", could be able to help them. Christopher impersonates Oliver at City Hall and fakes the Mayor's death when Church's mercenary attacks. The team realizes that Church plans to consolidate the drug traffic of five cities through Star City, needing Green Arrow eliminated for his plan to succeed. Oliver and his team, joined by Diggle and Christopher, raid Church's meeting and capture him along with several other crime lords. Oliver publicly claims that his faked death was part of a sting operation. Prometheus kills Church during transport, despite Church telling him Green Arrow's identity. Television reporter Susan Williams obtains evidence that Oliver was in Russia during the time he was supposedly stranded on Lian Yu. Meanwhile, Oliver finds out that Felicity is dating Billy Malone, a police detective recently assigned to the anti-crime unit. In flashbacks, Oliver is ambushed by other Bratva members. However, the men are killed by Christopher, whom Anatoly had hired to protect Oliver.
98	6	"So It Begins"	John Behring	Wendy Mericle & Brian Ford Sullivan	November 9, 2016	T27.13206	1.95
Oliver, Diggle, and Felicity privately track Prometheus, who starts killing seemingly random civilians with throwing stars. A news report on the killings causes tension in the city and angers the recruits, since they were not informed. Felicity steals one of the stars from Billy to examine it. A pattern between the victims relates to Oliver's list from when he first started out as the Hood. This further angers the recruits, Evelyn most of all, as they did not know about Oliver's "kill list" from when he initially returned. Felicity uses the pattern to predict future victims and the team splits up. Evelyn encounters Prometheus and engages him, managing to cut his arm before being overpowered. Oliver then arrives, but Prometheus escapes. Meanwhile, Thea discovers that Quentin never quit drinking. Evelyn reconciles with Oliver, and Felicity tells Billy that she works with the Green Arrow, which intrigues him. She later tells Oliver that evidence she has discovered suggests that Prometheus could be an SCPD officer; Quentin is shown waking from an alcohol-induced sleep with a slash across his arm and a throwing star in his possession. In flashbacks, during a Bratva operation, Oliver is abducted by Kovar's men and taken to him.
99	7	"Vigilante"	Gordon Verheul	Ben Sokolowski & Emilio Ortega Aldrich	November 16, 2016	T27.13207	1.86
A new vigilante appears in Star City, one who kills criminals in cold blood. Quentin tenders his resignation as Deputy Mayor. He later tells Thea about the throwing star and his drunken blackouts, but believes he is being set up. The team intercepts the Vigilante during a bank robbery, but he gets away, as does Eric Dunn, the head of the robbers. District Attorney Chase forces one of the other robbers to reveal Dunn's location and Green Arrow saves him from the Vigilante. Thea convinces Quentin to go into rehabilitation, while Oliver and Susan start getting closer. The team poses as bank robbers to lure out the Vigilante, who again escapes even after Oliver defeats and nearly unmasks him. Thea tells Oliver about Quentin and the possibility of him being framed; they deduce that Prometheus must know Green Arrow's identity. Evelyn is revealed to be working for Prometheus. In flashbacks, Kovar introduces Oliver to his servant Galina Venediktov, Taiana's mother. He also claims that the Bratva have only been using Oliver for their own ends, including making a deal with him. Kovar then releases Oliver back to the Bratva.
100	8	"Invasion!"	James Bamford	Story by : Greg Berlanti; Teleplay by : Marc Guggenheim & Wendy Mericle	November 30, 2016	T27.13208	3.55
Oliver finds himself back at Queen Manor; both his parents are alive, he is about to be married to Laurel Lance, and Diggle is The Hood. However, it is revealed that he, Diggle, Thea, Sara Lance, and Ray Palmer are all being held unconscious inside pods aboard the Dominator mothership. Meanwhile, Felicity, Curtis, and Cisco Ramon try to hack into the Dominators' mainframe using a piece of their technology. The team recovers a necessary device with the help of the Flash and Supergirl and manages to locate the others. Oliver begins seeing flashes of his former life, as do Sara and Ray. All five captives soon realize that they are inside a shared hallucination of simulated reality. Their escape attempt is blocked by manifestations of Malcolm Merlyn, Deathstroke, Damien Darhk, and their mercenaries. The group defeats all of them, then leaves the dream and awakens inside the ship. Escaping in a shuttle, they are rescued by the Waverider. Ray deduces that the Dominators were gathering information from their minds to help them complete a special "weapon", using the hallucination as a distraction. The team learns that the Dominator mothership is headed toward Earth. Note : This episode continues a crossover event that begins on The Flash season 3 episode 8 and concludes on Legends of Tomorrow season 2 episode 7.
101	9	"What We Leave Behind"	Antonio Negret	Wendy Mericle & Beth Schwartz	December 7, 2016	T27.13209	1.94
Prometheus obtains further intel about the team from Evelyn. He then attacks and hospitalizes Curtis, injecting him with a tuberculosis vaccine developed by Justin Claybourne, a corrupt pharmaceutical manufacturer named on Oliver's former kill list. Flashbacks show that Oliver killed Claybourne after discovering that he financed a tuberculosis epidemic, then raised the price on his drug to boost his company's profits. When the team tracks down Prometheus, Evelyn reveals her true allegiance and escapes with Prometheus. Investigating Prometheus on his own, Billy sends information he discovers to Felicity just before the villain captures him. The information turns out to be about Claybourne's illegitimate son, who may now be seeking retribution. Oliver deduces that Prometheus is at the former office building of the corporation that created the epidemic and goes there alone. He finds that Prometheus has staged it to resemble Oliver's prior attack. Oliver kills Prometheus, only to discover he has actually killed a gagged Billy, whom the real Prometheus set up as himself to trick Oliver. Curtis' husband, Paul, leaves him after discovering Curtis is a vigilante; Felicity mourns Billy's death; Diggle is recaptured; Oliver encounters an apparently alive Laurel Lance inside the lair.
102	10	"Who Are You?"	Gregory Smith	Ben Sokolowski & Brian Ford Sullivan	January 25, 2017	T27.13210	1.68
Oliver welcomes the seemingly-revived Laurel into the team, but it becomes clear that she is Laurel's Earth-2 doppelganger Black Siren, having been broken out of S.T.A.R. Labs by Prometheus. Laurel escapes and calls Oliver for a meeting, which ends in her capture. Learning about Paul, Rene convinces Curtis to focus on his capabilities, not his flaws. Oliver places Laurel in an A.R.G.U.S. facility, hoping to change her one day. Oliver reveals his plans to follow their Laurel's dying wish, to find a new Black Canary. In Hub City, a woman with a sonic scream stops an attempted assault in a bar. Meanwhile, Oliver convinces Chase to represent John whose corrupt superior, General Walker, arrives to transfer him into custody. However, Chase manages to keep John in his jurisdiction. In flashbacks, Gregor, the Bratva traitor, attempts to force Oliver's obedience, but Oliver is rescued by a female archer named Talia.
103	11	"Second Chances"	Mark Bunting	Speed Weed & Sarah Tarkoff	February 1, 2017	T27.13211	1.91
During the S.T.A.R. Labs incident, Central City Police Department (CCPD) undercover officer Tina Boland develops a sonic scream after watching her partner die at the hands of drug dealer Sean Sonus. In the present day, Chase tells Oliver that the NSA had been investigating Walker, but its file has disappeared. While Felicity tries to locate it, Oliver takes Rene and Curtis to Hub City to recruit Tina. She initially refuses to join, but the team intercepts her attacking Sonus, who is also a metahuman with sonic powers. Sonus escapes and Oliver reveals his identity to convince Tina to let him help her. Oliver's team helps her defeat the dealers during a shipment, but Oliver fails to dissuade her from killing Sonus. Meanwhile, Felicity meets with a hacktivist whom she inspired during her college days and receives the file against Walker along with a cache of other secret information. With the file, Chase manages to get John released. Tina meets Oliver and agrees to join the team, revealing that her real name is Dinah Drake. In flashbacks, Talia helps Oliver kill an important associate of Kovar's. She also urges Oliver to become the avenger his father wanted him to be for Starling City.
104	12	"Bratva"	Ben Bray	Oscar Balderrama & Emilio Ortega Aldrich	February 8, 2017	T27.13212	1.61
In flashbacks, Oliver and Talia kill a drug merchant from Robert Queen's list. Talia presses Oliver to return home, but he chooses to help Anatoly kill Gregor. In the present, the team learns that Walker is in Russia for a deal with Markovian terrorists. Oliver takes everyone except Rene, who is helping Quentin prepare for an interview with Susan. Anatoly refuses to help Oliver unless he does something criminal in return, which Oliver refuses. After Felicity blackmails a Russian analyst, the team captures Walker's henchman, whom John tortures to no avail. To prevent John and Felicity from acting against their morals, Oliver and Dinah accept Anatoly's terms and attack a rival. The team and the Bratva intercept Walker's deal. John decides to spare Walker, who is arrested by the US military police, while Rory uses his rags to contain the nuclear blast of Walker's failsafe bomb. Upon returning, Oliver sleeps with Susan, who later deduces his alter-ego after learning about a similar hooded vigilante who was in Russia five years ago. Rory tells Felicity that his rags do not function anymore and that he needs to leave temporarily. Meanwhile, with Rene's help, Quentin's interview is successful and they become friends.
105	13	"Spectre of the Gun"	Kristin Windell	Marc Guggenheim	February 15, 2017	T27.13213	1.66
Sixteen months prior, Rene watched as his wife, an addict, was killed by a dealer in front of their daughter, Zoe, who was subsequently transferred to foster care, barring Rene from seeing her. He was inspired by the Green Arrow killing Darhk and saving Star City and decided to start his vigilantism. In the present, Rene now works for Quentin as his assistant. An armed man attacks city hall, killing seven staff members and wounding several others. Felicity identifies the shooter as James Edlund, a former clerk and a proponent of gun control who lost his family in a shootout months prior. Thea and Quentin encourage Oliver to deal with the situation as the mayor, not the vigilante. Oliver decides to work with the city council towards a gun control act. Rene and Curtis locate Edlund's hideout and find his next target, where Oliver confronts Edlund as the mayor and dissuades him from killing anyone, convincing him to surrender. Oliver reaches an agreement with the council with Rene's help. Curtis promises to help Rene get Zoe back legally. Meanwhile, John convinces Dinah to return to a normal life, and she enlists in the SCPD.
106	14	"The Sin-Eater"	Mary Lambert	Barbara Bloom & Jenny Lynn	February 22, 2017	T27.13214	1.54
Oliver meets Prometheus' alleged mother, but she refuses to help him. During a prison transfer, Chien Na Wei, Carrie Cutter, and Liza Warner kill the guards and escape. Oliver appoints Dinah as an SCPD officer. Frank Pike receives evidence that the Green Arrow killed Malone and orders a manhunt. Oliver and Quentin track down the trio, but they escape due to the intervention of the Anti-Crime Unit (ACU). Oliver surmises that Prometheus is responsible for sending the evidence. Oliver denies being the Green Arrow to Susan. Thea discredits her by having Felicity hack Susan's files and insert proof that she committed plagiarism. Susan gets angry with Oliver, who then confronts Thea. He reveals the circumstances surrounding Malone's death to Pike. The team intercepts the trio stealing money from a stash left by Church, but are ambushed by their mercenaries. The ACU arrives and arrests the trio, allowing the team to leave. Quentin gives Dinah his blessing to assume the Black Canary identity. Word of the cover-up is later leaked to the media and the allegations are serious enough that impeachment is on the table. In flashbacks, Oliver and Anatoly engage Gregor and his men. Gregor prepares to kill Anatoly.
107	15	"Fighting Fire with Fire"	Michael Schultz	Speed Weed & Ben Sokolowski	March 1, 2017	T27.13215	1.60
Oliver's impeachment process begins, with Chase serving as his attorney. The Vigilante starts targeting the former, but is opposed by Prometheus, who is revealed to be Chase. Using Pandora, Felicity and Thea learn about a secret that can be used to blackmail an alderman. Oliver and John dissuade them from using it. Using a piece of the Vigilante's visor, Curtis manages to track him down to where he plans to assassinate Oliver. To give himself a fighting chance to remain mayor, Oliver publicly disavows the Green Arrow as a "cop killer", stating his motive for the cover-up was to protect the people from losing hope. The Vigilante escapes. The council votes against impeachment, but Thea resigns from Oliver's administration in order to work on her morality. Paul decides to divorce Curtis. Susan gets her job back due to Felicity's anonymous testimony. Felicity then secretly joins Helix. Chase aggressively demands that Susan listen to his story. In flashbacks, Anatoly demands "spross dopross", the process by which the Pakhan may be overthrown. Oliver infiltrates Kovar's mansion and acquires evidence that Gregor has been embezzling the Bratva's money. The majority of the captains vote for Anatoly, but Gregor starts a mutiny.
108	16	"Checkmate"	Ken Shane	Beth Schwartz & Sarah Tarkoff	March 15, 2017	T27.13216	1.53
Oliver meets Talia, who reveals herself to be Ra's al Ghul's daughter. She tells Oliver that she hates him for killing her father, so she helped Chase become Prometheus. Oliver confronts Chase, who says that he has kidnapped Williams and she will starve if Oliver kills him. The Green Arrow breaks into Chase's house and tries to reason with Chase's wife, Doris, until the ACU storms in, forcing him to escape. Felicity agrees to hack Department of Homeland Security drones for Helix in exchange for assistance in finding Williams' location. Oliver's team enters the building, finding and rescuing Williams before Oliver confronts Chase. Diggle brings Doris to try and convince Chase to surrender, only for him to mortally stab her. Oliver engages Chase while the others take Williams and Doris away. Talia arrives and helps Chase overpower and abduct Oliver. Chase tells Oliver that he plans to help Oliver learn who he really is. Meanwhile, Chase continues acting normally at City Hall, angering the team. In flashbacks, most of the Bratva captains are killed in the shootout before Gregor escapes. Oliver and Anatoly attack Gregor during a meeting with his loyal followers and subdue him.
109	17	"Kapiushon"	Kevin Tancharoen	Brian Ford Sullivan & Emilio Ortega Aldrich	March 22, 2017	T27.13217	1.38
In flashbacks, Anatoly becomes the new Pakhan. Kovar buys sarin gas from Malcolm. Anatoly learns that Kovar is planning a coup against the Russian government. By torturing an operative of Kovar, Oliver learns that Kovar has invited key government officials to his casino, where he plans to assassinate all of them by the gas. Oliver convinces Galina, the mother of Taiana and Vlad Venediktov, to give him her key card to the casino. Oliver and the Bratva infiltrate the casino, where Kovar learns about Galina's betrayal and kills her, angering Oliver, who fails to stop the spread of the gas in time, leading to Viktor's death. Anatoly fails to persuade Oliver from killing Kovar. The former appoints him as a Bratva captain. Malcolm helps Kovar's operatives revive him. In the present, Chase tortures Oliver to make him confess a "secret". The former brings a seemingly reluctant Evelyn, apparently killing her after Oliver refuses to do it. Oliver reveals that he killed people because he liked it, which Chase wanted to hear. Evelyn is revealed to be alive and still assisting Chase. Chase lets Oliver go, and he returns to the hideout and tells the team about his decision to end his vigilantism.
110	18	"Disbanded"	JJ Makaro	Rebecca Bellotto	March 29, 2017	T27.13218	1.55
With Chase having broken him, Oliver disbands the team and calls in the Bratva to take out Chase. Diggle tries to talk Oliver out of it, reminding him that there are better ways of doing things. Felicity goes to Helix and manages to find pixelated footage of Chase taking off his Prometheus mask. Oliver allows the Bratva to steal diabetes medicine as a down-payment, but they are stopped by the team. Diggle tells Oliver that they can fix him if he is willing to accept help. Oliver rejoins the team, taking out the Bratva and saving hostages that Anatoly had taken as leverage. Felicity and Curtis manage to decode Chase's pixelation device, revealing Prometheus' identity to the police. Oliver claims he's not ready to put the hood back on yet but, with his team, it will be sooner rather than later. When Chase's guards try to arrest him, he kills them and leaves his safe house. In flashbacks, Oliver wants to return to Lian Yu, so Anatoly plans one last heist to help sick children, hoping to convince Oliver to stay, but Oliver still intends to return to Lian Yu in order to stage his dramatic return to Starling City.
111	19	"Dangerous Liaisons"	Joel Novoa	Speed Weed & Elizabeth Kim	April 26, 2017	T27.13219	1.36
With law enforcement agencies unable to locate Chase, Felicity agrees to Alena's plan to free former Helix leader Cayden James, who created a biometric tracker that can find anyone, but is currently in A.R.G.U.S. custody without due process. Lyla plans to use James as bait to destroy Helix, but Alena, having already anticipated that, finds James' true location and leads her team, including Felicity, to the rescue. They are interrupted by the team, but Felicity forces them to allow Helix to escape with James. Helix ends their connection with Felicity, but provides her with James' scanner, which she uses to learn that Chase is already in the team's hideout, starting an assault. Meanwhile, Quentin confronts Rene for not visiting Zoe, though legally possible. Rene believes himself to be an unsuitable father. However, Quentin organizes a visit, making Rene decide to fight to regain custody of Zoe. John confronts Lyla for her moral ambiguity which led to their divorce previously.
112	20	"Underneath"	Wendey Stanzler	Wendy Mericle & Beth Schwartz	May 3, 2017	T27.13220	1.36
Chase triggers an EMP within the team hideout, deactivating all the equipment, stranding Oliver and Felicity, and rendering her paralyzed. Curtis learns about the attack, informing Rene and Dinah. Diggle and Lyla agree to put their problems aside when they hear about Oliver and Felicity. The team soon realizes that, after a period of time, a backup generator will activate, igniting the methane gas currently leaking into the base. Oliver is injured trying to find a way out. Eventually, Diggle is lowered down an access shaft with the others' help and manages to pull up both Oliver and Felicity. The team takes refuge at A.R.G.U.S., where Diggle and Lyla reconcile. Later, Chase is revealed to have tracked down Oliver's son, William. In flashbacks to the period after Damien's death, Oliver, Felicity, and Curtis continue working together. Curtis arranges to have Oliver and Felicity spend time together, leading to their having sex in the lair, but she decides that she is not ready to get back together with Oliver, who accepts it.
113	21	"Honor Thy Fathers"	Laura Belsey	Marc Guggenheim & Sarah Tarkoff	May 10, 2017	T27.13221	1.65
Chase's prosecutions are discredited and most of the convicts, including Sampson, are released on bail. Oliver is sent a body, identified as Henry Goodwin. While Curtis and Dinah track Sampson, the others investigate Goodwin, who is revealed to have been killed by Robert Queen, shocking Thea and Oliver. The team deduces that Chase and Sampson are working together to release Claybourne's weaponized tuberculosis in Star City. With Oliver wearing the Green Arrow costume again, they track the bomb and engage Sampson's party while Oliver duels Chase. Sampson is captured as Curtis defuses the bomb. Oliver reveals that Claybourne planned to disown Chase due to Chase's mental condition. Disillusioned, Chase asks Oliver to kill him, but Oliver arrests him instead. Oliver gives Thea a video of Robert asking her to look after Oliver. Meanwhile, Rene refuses to testify in court so as not to upset Zoe, leading to the judge dismissing his claim. In flashbacks, Oliver and Anatoly return to Lian Yu, where they arrange for Oliver's return to Starling City. Anatoly leaves to bribe the boatmen to sail towards the island, but Oliver gets captured by Kovar, who knows about Oliver's plan.
114	22	"Missing"	Mairzee Almas	Speed Weed & Oscar Balderrama	May 17, 2017	T27.13222	1.44
The team holds a birthday party for Oliver, but Rene, Dinah, and Curtis are later kidnapped by Chase's outside team. Realizing that Chase is picking them off after Thea and Quentin are kidnapped by Black Siren and Evelyn, Oliver accepts Malcolm's aid to help him lean on Chase. However, Chase reveals he has kidnapped William and Oliver is forced to free him. Felicity and Diggle are kidnapped by Talia and her followers, while Oliver recruits Nyssa al Ghul to help him fight Chase's army. Tracking a plane carrying Chase, they realize they are going to Lian Yu. Arriving on the island, Oliver visits Slade and asks for his help. In flashbacks, Kovar injects a drug into Oliver that forces him to suffer visceral hallucinations of painful moments from the last five years. After enduring visions of Yao Fei and Laurel, Oliver eventually finds the strength to escape.
115	23	"Lian Yu"	Jesse Warn	Wendy Mericle & Marc Guggenheim	May 24, 2017	T27.13223	1.72
Oliver recruits a Mirakuru-less and hate-free Slade Wilson. Harkness is also recruited, but he quickly defects to Chase. Oliver's group frees Felicity, Thea, Curtis, and Samantha Clayton and traps Evelyn. Oliver asks Malcolm to take Felicity's group to Chase's plane in order to escape and manages to free John, Rene, Dinah, and Quentin, who knocks Black Siren unconscious while Nyssa defeats Talia. Malcolm kills Harkness, but sacrifices himself by taking Thea's place on a tripped landmine, allowing Felicity's group to escape. They reach the plane, but learn that the whole island is rigged with C-4 explosives, which will detonate if Chase dies. Oliver asks John to lead the others to Felicity's group and escape while Oliver captures Chase on a boat and frees William, who learns that his father is the Green Arrow. The plane is sabotaged, so Oliver tells the others to run to a ship on the opposite side of the island. Chase kills himself in front of Oliver and William, causing the bombs to demolish Lian Yu and leaving them unsure of the others' fates. In flashbacks, Oliver kills Kovar and his men, reaches the boat in time and calls his mother, Moira, on his way home.

== Cast and characters ==
=== Main ===
- Stephen Amell as Oliver Queen / Green Arrow
- David Ramsey as John Diggle / Spartan
- Willa Holland as Thea Queen / Speedy
- Emily Bett Rickards as Felicity Smoak / Overwatch
- Echo Kellum as Curtis Holt / Mister Terrific
- Josh Segarra as Adrian Chase / Prometheus (Note: Credited from "A Matter of Trust" onwards.)
- Paul Blackthorne as Quentin Lance

=== Recurring ===
- Katie Cassidy as Laurel Lance (Earth-1) and Laurel Lance / Black Siren (Earth-2)
- Rick Gonzalez as Rene Ramirez / Wild Dog
- Chad L. Coleman as Tobias Church
- Adrian Holmes as Frank Pike
- Mike Dopud as Viktor
- David Nykl as Anatoly Knyazev
- Tyler Ritter as Billy Malone
- Madison McLaughlin as Evelyn Sharp / Artemis
- Joe Dinicol as Rory Regan / Ragman
- Audrey Marie Anderson as Lyla Michaels
- Carly Pope as Susan Williams
- Dolph Lundgren as Konstantin Kovar
- David Meunier as Ishmael Gregor
- John Barrowman as Malcolm Merlyn / Dark Archer (Note: Also credited in the special appearance bill in two episodes.)
- Juliana Harkavy as Dinah Drake / Black Canary
- Lexa Doig as Talia al Ghul
- Kacey Rohl as Alena Whitlock

=== Guest ===
- Alexander Calvert as Lonnie Machin / Anarky
- Garry Chalk as J.G. Walker
- Suki Kaiser as Janet Carroll
- Cody Runnels as Derek Sampson
- Michael Rowe as Floyd Lawton / Deadshot
- Vincent Gale as Pyotr Friedkin
- Greg Rogers as Kullens
- Wil Traval as Christopher Chance / Human Target
- Toby Levins as Eric Dunn
- Neal McDonough as Damien Darhk
- Grant Gustin as Barry Allen / Flash
- Susanna Thompson as Moira Queen
- Caity Lotz as Sara Lance / White Canary
- Brandon Routh as Ray Palmer / Atom
- Carlos Valdes as Cisco Ramon / Vibe
- Nick Zano as Nate Heywood / Steel
- Melissa Benoist as Kara Danvers / Supergirl
- Jamey Sheridan as Robert Queen
- Erica Luttrell as Laura Washington / Cyberwoman
- Garwin Sanford as Justin Claybourne
- Patrick Sabongui as David Singh
- Steve Bacic as Sean Sonus / Dischord
- Samaire Armstrong as Laura Ramirez
- Cliff Chamberlain as James Edlund
- Laara Sadiq as Emily Pollard
- Kelly Hu as Chien Na Wei / China White
- Amy Gumenick as Carrie Cutter / Cupid
- Corina Akeson as Amanda Westfield
- Rutina Wesley as Liza Warner
- Venus Terzo as Elisa Schwartz
- Katrina Law as Nyssa al Ghul
- Manu Bennett as Slade Wilson
- Nick E. Tarabay as Digger Harkness / Captain Boomerang
- Anna Hopkins as Samantha Clayton

== Production ==
=== Development ===
On March 11, 2016, The CW renewed Arrow for a fifth season. Marc Guggenheim and Wendy Mericle served as the season's showrunners.

=== Writing ===
While Arrow began as a "grounded, gritty" series that focused on realism, following the introduction of The Flash in the same universe, it started embracing fantastical elements. Stephen Amell revealed that, in contrast, the Big Bad of the fifth season would not have any superpowers, and also confirmed that the season would follow the more realistic approach of the first two seasons. Nevertheless, he later confirmed that the events of The Flash season 2 finale, which ended with Barry Allen / Flash traveling back in time to save his mother from murder, would affect the events of the fifth season of Arrow. Guggenheim expanded upon this, saying John Diggle would be the most notable to be affected. The second episode of The Flash season 3 reveals that Diggle's daughter Sara has been erased from existence and replaced with a son named John Diggle Jr. as a result of Barry's time travel.

Guggenheim described "legacy" as the theme of the fifth season: "The idea [is] Oliver honoring Black Canary's [Katie Cassidy] legacy after [Laurel Lance's] death last year [...] What we're doing is we're dramatizing Oliver's desire to grow, move forward, and evolve, but this concept of legacy keeps threatening to pull him back to the early days", and that Oliver would be indirectly responsible for the creation behind Prometheus, the season's Big Bad. Although Guggenheim initially stated this Prometheus was an original creation not based on the comics character of the same name created by Grant Morrison, his civilian identity is later revealed as Adrian Chase. The comics version of the character is Vigilante, but Mericle explained he was made Prometheus for the series "because everybody would be thinking, 'Of course he's going to be Vigilante,' [...] We thought it would be a really fun twist to... take the comic-book mythology and turn it on its head and see what kind of story we can mine from a surprise like that."

Season five's flashbacks focus on Oliver's time in Russia, and explain how he learned Russian and received the Bratva tattoo. It is also the final season to focus on the flashbacks depicting Oliver's five-year period as a castaway. Guggenheim revealed that, unlike previous seasons, the fifth-season finale would not have Star City in danger, and would not even take place there. Instead, the episode, titled "Lian Yu" takes place on the island of the same name.

=== Casting ===
Main cast members Stephen Amell, David Ramsey, Willa Holland, Emily Bett Rickards and Paul Blackthorne return from previous seasons as Oliver Queen / Green Arrow, John Diggle / Spartan, Thea Queen, Felicity Smoak and Quentin Lance, respectively. Echo Kellum, who recurred as Curtis Holt in season four, was promoted to series regular for season five, while Josh Segarra joined the season as Adrian Chase. Michael Dorn voiced the character when disguised as Prometheus. Katie Cassidy, who starred as Laurel Lance in the first four seasons, returned as the character in a guest capacity, and recurred as the character's Earth-2 doppelganger Black Siren, a character introduced in season two of The Flash. John Barrowman, who portrayed Malcolm Merlyn on Arrow as a regular during seasons two and three, signed a contract with Warner Bros. Television that allowed him to continue being a regular on Arrow as well as the other Arrowverse shows, including The Flash and Legends of Tomorrow. Former series regulars Susanna Thompson and Manu Bennett returned to the season in guest roles as Moira Queen and Slade Wilson, respectively. Thea was significantly absent during the season, and Guggenheim explained that Holland was only contracted to appear in 14 of the season's 23 episodes.

Chad L. Coleman recurred in the first few episodes as crime lord Tobias Church. The character is not based on any existing DC Comics character; Coleman called him "Jay-Z, Dr. Dre, and Suge Knight all rolled into one". Rick Gonzalez recurs in the role of Wild Dog, based on the DC Comics character of the same name. However, his civilian name for the series is Rene Ramirez, unlike the comics where it is Jack Wheeler. Gonzalez said he auditioned for the season without knowing what role he would play, until the series' costume designer Maya Mani told him he would be playing Wild Dog; Gonzalez was surprised since he expected he would be cast as a non-vigilante. Madison McLaughlin, who previously appeared in the season four episode "Canary Cry" as Evelyn Sharp, a teenager who briefly assumed the Black Canary mantle, returned for the fifth season in a recurring capacity with the character now assuming the moniker Artemis, named after the comics character Artemis Crock. In November 2016, it was announced that Juliana Harkavy would play Tina Boland in a recurring role; her character was later revealed to be Dinah Drake, named after the first Black Canary in the comics.

=== Design ===
Maya Mani returned to design costumes for the fifth season. Oliver's Green Arrow costume of the season was designed to look almost exactly like the one worn in season four, one notable change being the re-introduction of sleeves from previous costumes, which the fourth season costume eschewed. In the season, Diggle replaces his Spartan helmet, which was introduced in season four, with a new one. Ramsey said this new helmet can do "extraordinary things", apart from being just about conceallment. Concept artist Andy Poon said the new helmet offers Diggle "full protection". He added that, since Diggle's codename is Spartan, he decided to make the helmet resemble "an actual spartan helmet design". The earlier helmet was criticized by fans for its resemblance to that worn by the Marvel Comics character Magneto and Poon, a comic book fan himself, thought the new helmet would fix "the issues regarding some of the fan feedback about [the older helmet] looking similar to other comic book characters". The Wild Dog costume was designed to look exactly as it does in the comics, by consisting of simply a sweatshirt and hockey gear. Gonzalez confirmed it reflects who the character is. Dinah Drake's vigilante costume in the season includes a mask resembling the Black Canary mask in the comics, along with a leather jacket.

=== Filming ===
Filming for the season began on July 5, 2016, in Vancouver, and ended in April 2017.

=== Arrowverse tie-ins ===
During the fifth season, Arrow was a part of the "Invasion!" crossover event with The Flash and Legends of Tomorrow. The event also saw Melissa Benoist reprising her role as Kara Danvers / Supergirl from Supergirl. The Arrow portion of the crossover is also the series' 100th episode.

== Release ==
=== Broadcast ===
The season began airing in the United States on The CW on October 5, 2016, and completed its 23-episode run on May 24, 2017.

=== Home media ===
The season was released on DVD on September 18, 2017, and on Blu-ray the following day. It began streaming on Netflix on June 1, 2017.

== Reception ==
=== Critical response ===
The review aggregator Rotten Tomatoes reported an 88% approval rating based on 193 critics reviews, with an average rating of 7.38 out of 10. The website's critical consensus reads, "No stranger to dramatic twists and turns, season five of Arrow continues to introduce new villains and surprise viewers despite some inconsistency."

Jesse Schedeen of IGN gave the entire season a rating of 8.7 out of 10. He said the season's biggest flaw was "that it tried to juggle more characters and conflicts than was really feasible", but praised the writers for downplaying Oliver-Felicity's romance in favor of focusing on Felicity's induction into Helix. He called Prometheus "the series' best villain since Deathstroke" due to Segarra's performance and the "very personal nature of his feud with Oliver Queen", adding that the "personal nature of that conflict tended to bring out the best in Amell's acting". Schedeen noted that the season's flashbacks suffered from some of the same problems in the flashbacks of season 3 and 4 which did "little more than filling space and drawing pointless parallels between past and present", but still called the season 5 flashbacks "a significant improvement. It helps that the flashbacks were used to fill in a key hole in the Arrow tapestry". He added that while the finales of season 3 and 4 only managed to worsen them, in contrast the season 5 finale "proved to be not just the best episode of Season 5, but of the series as a whole". Schedeen concluded with verdict that the series "bounced back from a prolonged slump in Season 5, proving that the series still has plenty of life left."

Reviewing the season premiere, Caroline Preece of Den of Geek called it "a return to the heights of season one in all the best ways". She praised it for returning to the series' grounded and gritty nature, saying "This is what Arrow should always have been – the slightly grimy street level counterpart to the ever-expanding roster of cheesier, brighter series like Supergirl or Legends of Tomorrow. It should be the Batman to your Superman." Tyler McCarthy of the same website called the season finale "mixed bag to say the least, but it really came together in the end. Season five had a lot riding on it, especially after the shark-jumping events of season four [...] In the end, the show did its job and delivered a complicated crime drama that factored masked heroes in as key cogs in the larger machine – with some aliens thrown in for good measure." Reviewing the same episode, Alasdair Wilkins of The A.V. Club said, "Taken in isolation, "Lian Yu" is a strong but probably not superlative episode. Other episodes have had bigger action beats, better observed character moments, stronger points to make about who Oliver is and what his existence as the Green Arrow means. But this episode climbs into the uppermost echelon of Arrow episodes because it taps directly into everything that has come before it."

=== Ratings ===
Viewership and ratings per episode of Arrow season 5
No.	Title	Air date	Rating/share (18–49)	Viewers (millions)	DVR (18–49)	DVR viewers (millions)	Total (18–49)	Total viewers (millions)
1	"Legacy"	October 5, 2016	0.7/3	1.87	0.6	1.20	1.3	3.07
2	"The Recruits"	October 12, 2016	0.7/3	1.94	0.6	1.23	1.3	3.17
3	"A Matter of Trust"	October 19, 2016	0.6/2	1.79	0.6	1.15	1.2	2.94
4	"Penance"	October 26, 2016	0.7/3	1.87	0.5	1.09	1.2	2.96
5	"Human Target"	November 2, 2016	0.6/2	1.61	0.5	1.03	1.1	2.65
6	"So It Begins"	November 9, 2016	0.7/3	1.95	0.4	1.01	1.1	2.95
7	"Vigilante"	November 16, 2016	0.7/3	1.86	0.5	—N/a	1.2	—N/a
8	"Invasion!"	November 30, 2016	1.3/5	3.55	0.7	1.80	2.0	5.34
9	"What We Leave Behind"	December 7, 2016	0.7/3	1.94	0.5	1.13	1.2	3.07
10	"Who Are You?"	January 25, 2017	0.6/2	1.68	0.5	1.13	1.1	2.82
11	"Second Chances"	February 1, 2017	0.6/2	1.91	0.5	1.08	1.1	2.99
12	"Bratva"	February 8, 2017	0.6/2	1.61	0.5	1.12	1.1	2.73
13	"Spectre of the Gun"	February 15, 2017	0.6/2	1.66	—N/a	0.90	—N/a	2.56
14	"The Sin-Eater"	February 22, 2017	0.5/2	1.54	0.4	0.92	0.9	2.46
15	"Fighting Fire with Fire"	March 1, 2017	0.6/2	1.60	—N/a	—N/a	—N/a	—N/a
16	"Checkmate"	March 15, 2017	0.5/2	1.53	0.4	0.86	0.9	2.39
17	"Kapiushon"	March 22, 2017	0.5/2	1.38	0.4	0.95	0.9	2.33
18	"Disbanded"	March 29, 2017	0.5/2	1.55	0.4	—N/a	0.9	—N/a
19	"Dangerous Liaisons"	April 26, 2017	0.5/2	1.36	—N/a	—N/a	—N/a	—N/a
20	"Underneath"	May 3, 2017	0.5/2	1.36	0.4	0.86	0.9	2.24
21	"Honor Thy Fathers"	May 10, 2017	0.6/2	1.65	0.4	1.00	1.0	2.64
22	"Missing"	May 17, 2017	0.5/2	1.44	0.4	0.94	0.9	2.38
23	"Lian Yu"	May 24, 2017	0.6/3	1.72	0.5	0.96	1.1	2.67

=== Accolades ===
Arrow, season 5 award nominations
Year	Award	Category	Nominee(s)	Result	Ref.
2017	Leo Awards	Best Cinematography Dramatic Series	Shamus Whiting-Hewlett ("Sins of the Father")	Nominated	
2017	Leo Awards	Best Lead Performance by a Female Dramatic Series	Emily Bett Rickards ("Who Are You?")	Nominated	
2017	Leo Awards	Best Stunt Coordination Dramatic Series	Curtis Braconnier, Eli Zagoudakis ("What We Leave Behind")	Won	
2017	MTV Movie & TV Awards	Best Hero	Stephen Amell	Nominated	
2017	People's Choice Awards	Favorite Network TV Sci-Fi/Fantasy	Arrow	Nominated	
2017	Saturn Awards	Best Superhero Adaptation Television Series	Arrow	Nominated	
2017	Teen Choice Awards	Choice Action TV Actor	Stephen Amell	Nominated	
2017	Teen Choice Awards	Choice Action TV Actress	Emily Bett Rickards	Nominated	
2017	Teen Choice Awards	Choice Action TV Show	Arrow	Nominated	
2017	Teen Choice Awards	Choice TV Villain	Josh Segarra	Nominated	
