= The Chicago Way =

- Legends of Tomorrow episode
- Episode no.: Season 2 Episode 8
- Directed by: Ralph Hemecker
- Written by: Sarah Nicole Jones; Ray Utarnachitt
- Production code: T13.20008
- Original air date: December 8, 2016

Guest appearances
- John Barrowman as Malcolm Merlyn; Isaac Keoughan as Al Capone; Neal McDonough as Damien Darhk; Wentworth Miller as Leonard Snart; Cole Vigue as Eliot Ness

Episode chronology
← Previous "Invasion!"	Next → "Raiders of the Lost Art"
- Legends of Tomorrow season 2

"The Chicago Way" is the eight episode and mid-season finale of the second season of the American science fiction television series Legends of Tomorrow, revolving around the eponymous team of superheroes and their time travelling adventures. It is set in the Arrowverse, sharing continuity with the other television series of the universe. The episode was written by Sarah Nicole Jones and Ray Utarnachitt, and directed by Ralph Hemecker.

The episode focuses on the Legends as they work to protect an amulet from Eobard Thawne (Matt Letscher) and the Legion of Doom. The Legion ally with gangster Al Capone in order to draw the Legends out. The episode features the return of former series regular Wentworth Miller as Leonard Snart as well as the first appearance of Arrow cast member John Barrowman on Legends of Tomorrow.

== Plot ==
Eobard Thawne, Damien Darhk and Malcolm Merlyn arrive in 1927 Chicago. They ally with Al Capone and his empire causing damage to the timeline. Learning of the aberration, the Legends arrive and manage to keep Capone from murdering Eliot Ness. Ness is critically injured, so the team decides to obtain vital information on Capone's operation to secure history. Meanwhile, Mick begins having hallucinations of Snart, who belittles him for acting like his teammates. Sara and Martin are abducted by Eobard during their infiltration and raid on Capone's club. Malcolm offers Sara a chance to change her past in return for the amulet she took from Darhk in 1987, but she refuses. The team rescues the captives, but "Martin" turns out to be a disguised Eobard, who searches the Waverider at super-speed for the amulet while Malcolm and Capone's men attack the ship directly. Eobard barely escapes revenge at Amaya's hand, but Sara surrenders the amulet for Martin's safety. The Legends succeed in correcting the timeline. Eobard later shows his partners that the completed amulet projects a holographic map that can locate the Spear of Destiny, which is able to "rewrite reality itself". However, in order to find the spear, they need help from former captain of the Legends Rip Hunter who has been presumed dead. Rip is revealed to be working as a movie director in 1967 Los Angeles.

== Production ==
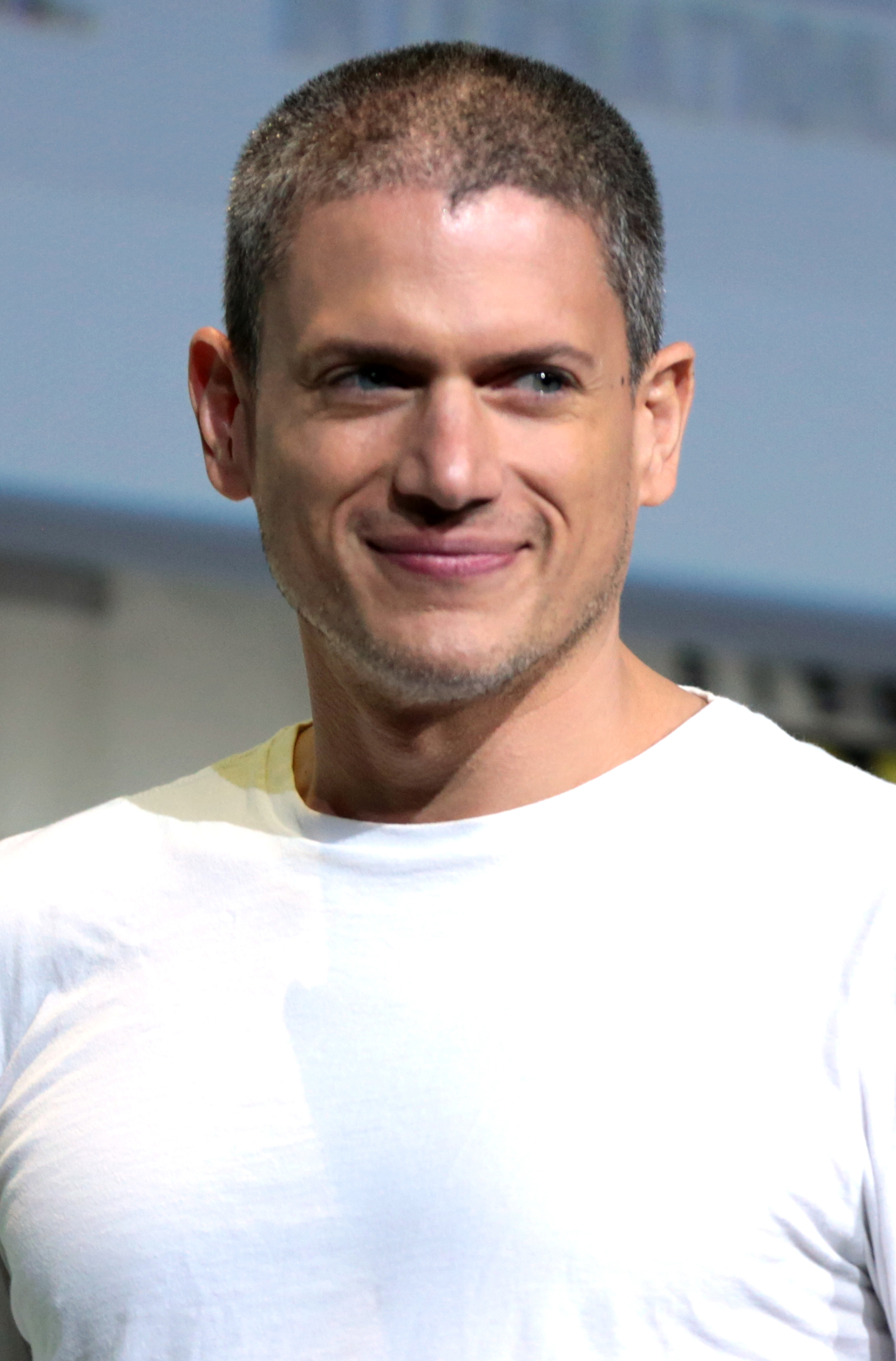
Wentworth Miller speaking at the 2016 San Diego Comic-Con International in San Diego, California.

"The Chicago Way" was written by Sarah Nicole Jones and Ray Utarnachitt; it was directed by Ralph Hemecker. Jones and Utarnachitt began writing the episode on September 29, 2016, and finished the day before the day entered preparation. Preparation on the episode ended on October 12, with a break for Canadian Thanksgiving on October 10. Shooting ran from October 13 through October 24. The title of the episode is a reference to the film The Untouchables, additionally the episode also featured several references to the film.

The episode stars Caity Lotz, Matt Letscher, Brandon Routh, Arthur Darvill, Nick Zano, Franz Drameh, Dominic Purcell, Amy Pemberton, Victor Garber, and Maisie Richardson-Sellers as Sara Lance, Eobard Thawne, Ray Palmer, Rip Hunter, Nate Haywood, Jefferson Jackson, Mick Rory, Gideon (voice), Martin Stein, and Amaya Jiwe. The episode guest stars John Barrowman, Neal McDonough, and Wentworth Miller reprising their respective roles as Malcolm Merlyn, Damien Dahrk, and Leonard Snart. The episode was Millers first appearance in Legends of Tomorrow season two. He had previously appeared in the first season as a series regular. Barrowman had previously appeared as Malcolm in Arrow, the parent series of Legends of Tomorrow. The episode also features fictionalized versions of Al Capone and Eliot Ness portrayed by Isaac Keoughan and Cole Vigue respectively.

== Release ==
=== Broadcast ===
"The Chicago Way" was broadcast on The CW on December 8, 2016, to an audience of 2 million viewers with a 0.7/3 share among adults 18–49. The episode was viewed by 1.38 million less people than the previous episode, "Invasion!", but 260 thousand more than the following episode "Raiders of the Lost Art". When accounting for seven-day DVR viewership the episode was seen by an additional 1.37 million viewers for a total audience size of 3.17 million. "The Chicago Way" was the second highest viewed of the season only behind "Invasion!".

=== Critical reception ===
"The Chicago Way" received mixed but positive reviews from critics. IGN's Jesse Schedeen felt positively on the episode rating it a 9.2/10 and listing it as "Editors Choice". He praised the fight between the Legends and the Legion writing, "Legends of Tomorrow wrapped 2016 with a terrific episode featuring the first clash with the Legion of Doom." Den of Geek's Jim Dandeneau gave the episode a 3.5/5. He noted that the episode felt like there was "some kind of overflow from Arrow's 100th episode: both last week’s episode and this week’s have been particularly emotional for characters from that show." Dandeneau praised the role of Malcolm Merlyn, noting how John Barrowman outshined the return of former series regular Wentworth Miller. He also praised the choreography of fight scenes involving Merlyn. Oliver Sava of The A.V. Club gave the episode a C+.
