= Lian Yu (Arrow) =

- Arrow episode
- Episode no.: Season 5 Episode 23
- Directed by: Jesse Warn
- Written by: Wendy Mericle; Marc Guggenheim
- Cinematography by: Gordon Verheul
- Editing by: Jessie Murray
- Production code: T27.13223
- Original air date: May 24, 2017
- Running time: 42 minutes

Guest appearances
- Katie Cassidy as Laurel Lance / Black Siren (special guest star); John Barrowman as Malcolm Merlyn (special guest star); Manu Bennett as Slade Wilson / Deathstroke (special guest star); Rick Gonzalez as Rene Ramirez / Wild Dog; Juliana Harkavy as Dinah Drake / Black Canary; Katrina Law as Nyssa al Ghul; Madison McLaughlin as Evelyn Sharp; Lexa Doig as Talia al Ghul; Anna Hopkins as Samantha Clayton; Nick E. Tarabay as Digger Harkness / Captain Boomerang; Dolph Lundgren as Konstantin Kovar; Susanna Thompson as Moira Queen (special guest star)

Episode chronology
← Previous "Missing"	Next → "Fallout"
- Arrow season 5

"Lian Yu" (Chinese: 煉獄) is the twenty-third and final episode of the fifth season, and 115th episode overall of The CW series Arrow. The episode was written by showrunners Wendy Mericle and Marc Guggenheim and directed by Jesse Warn. It was first broadcast on May 24, 2017, on The CW.

The finale revolves about Oliver Queen (Stephen Amell), who is now in a desperate search for his son William, who has been kidnapped by Adrian Chase (Josh Segarra). Chase has gathered an army including Laurel Lance / Black Siren (Katie Cassidy) and his mercenaries to give the final confrontation against Oliver and returns to the place where everything began: Lian Yu. In order to achieve it, Chase kidnaps Oliver's friends and holds them hostages. With no options, Oliver teams up with Malcolm Merlyn (John Barrowman), Nyssa al Ghul (Katrina Law) and releases Slade Wilson (Manu Bennett) and Digger Harkness (Nick E. Tarabay) in order to help him fight against Chase. The episode is also the end of the flashbacks storyline which has been happening since the pilot episode.

The episode received universal acclaim from critics, who hailed the finale as the best episode of the series, praising Amell and Segarra's performances, the action scenes, conclusion to the flashbacks, and Bennett's return.

== Plot ==
On Lian Yu, Oliver Queen locates his hidden stash, but is confronted by Konstantin Kovar and his men. Oliver kills the men and finally snaps Kovar's neck. He dons his castaway disguise to appear as if he had been stranded there, before lighting a bonfire to alert the boat sent by Anatoly Knyazev. Oliver calls his mother Moira from the boat, letting her know he is alive and coming back.

Five years later, Oliver releases Slade Wilson and Digger Harkness from their A.R.G.U.S. cells on Lian Yu. With the Mirakuru wiped from his body, Slade claims to no longer hate Oliver, who offers to help him find his son in exchange for his help against Adrian Chase. The three regroup with Malcolm Merlyn and Nyssa al Ghul.

During an encounter with Talia al Ghul and Evelyn Sharp, Harkness turns on Oliver. Slade rejects an offer to join Harkness and helps Oliver's group overcome their adversaries, saving Felicity Smoak, Curtis Holt, Thea Queen, and Samantha Clayton. Oliver, Slade, and Nyssa go to save Dinah Drake, John Diggle, Quentin Lance, and Rene Ramirez, while Malcolm leads the others to safety. However, on the way, Thea steps on a landmine. Malcolm takes her place and then seemingly blows himself and Harkness up, while the others escape. Arriving on the beach, they discover that the island is rigged with C4 explosives.

After saving the others, Oliver's party is ambushed by Chase, Black Siren, and their men, starting a battle. Oliver stops short of killing Chase to prove his point. Demanding William's location, Oliver is told he is dead but sees through the lie. Felicity informs Oliver that the explosives are tied to Chase; if he dies, the C4 will detonate the island. Chase escapes and Oliver chases him while Diggle leads the others to the plane. Discovering that Chase has sabotaged the place, the group goes to locate an A.R.G.U.S. boat on the other side of the island.

Oliver catches Chase on a boat, where he reveals William and explains that if Oliver does not kill him, he will kill William and if Oliver does kill him, the explosives will kill everyone on the island. This being a part of Chase's plan to show Oliver that everyone around him dies. Oliver instead shoots Chase in the leg and rescues William, who now knows Oliver is his father and the Green Arrow. Chase shoots himself, causing Lian Yu to detonate while Oliver and William watch in horror.

== Production ==
In March 2017, Stephen Amell revealed that the 23rd and final episode for the fifth season would be directed by Jesse Warn and written by Wendy Mericle & Marc Guggenheim but no title was revealed. In April 2017, Marc Guggenheim announced the title to be "Lian Yu".

== Reception ==
=== Ratings ===
The episode was watched by 1.72 million viewers with a 0.6/3 share among adults aged 18 to 49. This was a 19% increase in viewership from the previous episode, which was seen by 1.44 million viewers and a 0.5/2 in the 18-49 demographics. This means that 0.6 percent of all households with televisions watched the episode, while 3 percent of all households watching television at that time watched it.

=== Critical response ===
"Lian Yu" received universal acclaim from critics, with many ranking it as the best episode of the show. Jesse Schedeen of IGN gave the episode a "masterpiece" 10 out of 10 and wrote in his verdict, "Arrow truly cemented its comeback with tonight's season finale. 'Lian Yu' is a high point not just for Season 5, but for the series as a whole. It succeeded in bringing Ollie's story full circle, making strong use of some very welcome guest stars and giving the Prometheus conflict the dramatic finish it deserved. The wait for the new season just got much, much more agonizing."

The A.V. Club's Alasdair Wilkins gave the episode an "A" grade and wrote, "Taken in isolation, 'Lian Yu' is a strong but probably not superlative episode. Other episodes have had bigger action beats, better observed character moments, stronger points to make about who Oliver is and what his existence as the Green Arrow means. But this episode climbs into the uppermost echelon of Arrow episodes because it taps directly into everything that has come before it. That sense of culmination makes tonight's episode something special, bringing what is effectively a decade's worth of story to an end... only to blow everything up. What happens from here is uncertain, and this finale sure appears to challenge Arrow's sixth season to carve out something new for the show. But as a final affirmation, even celebration of Arrow's journey up to this point — an imperfect journey that has mostly been fun, and often good or better, at least when Oliver wasn't doing whatever he was up to in Hong Kong for that one year — 'Lian Yu' is just about perfect. This episode is all that Arrow is... or perhaps, from now on, what it was."

Andy Behbakht of TV Overmind gave the episode a perfect 5 star rating out of 5 and wrote "Let's take a moment to applaud the brilliance of both Stephen Amell and Josh Segarra, who brought out the very best acting from each other this season on Arrow. Any scene between Oliver and Adrian Chase this season was absolutely electric, and it had to do with these two performers sharing the screen together. I'll miss Segarra's presence on the show in Season 6, but his performance ensures that Prometheus will go down as one of the all-time best Arrow villains."

Sara Netzley of EW gave the episode an "A" grade and stated: "Well, here endeth season 5, which was a bit of a roller coaster. The Russia flashbacks were a marked improvement over the season 4 flashbacks and Josh Segarra played a great villain, but the new team members were a bit of a mixed bag. Rene struggled to get beyond 'grating,' while Rory showed great promise before vanishing. And while Dinah's a welcome addition, let us never speak of reporter Susan again. Looking ahead, I'm hoping for a big bad who can top Adrian Chase, more Dinah, a swift resolution to Rene's custody battle, the return of Rory, Thea back full time, and a happy, drama-free Olicity in season 6." Lindsay Macdonald of TV Guide wrote positive about the episode, stating "It's true that season finales usually come with a bodycount, but killing off the entire cast besides Oliver and his son? That seems farfetched, even for The CW."
