= Dough Boys (film) =

2009 American drama film

- Directed by: Nicholas Harvell
- Written by: Preston A. Whitmore II
- Produced by: Preston A. Whitmore II
- Starring: Wood Harris; Arlen Escarpeta; Kirk Jones (Sticky Fingaz); Reagan Gomez-Preston
- Cinematography: Dan Schmeltzer
- Edited by: Andre Jones
- Release date: February 5, 2009
- Country: United States
- Language: English

Dough Boys is a 2009 drama film written and produced by Preston A. Whitmore II and directed by Nicholas Harvell.

== Plot ==
Corey, Smooth, Black and Long Cuz form a group of young men calling themselves the "Dough Boys".

== Cast ==
- Amanda Aardsma as Palova
- Wood Harris as Julian
- Arlen Escarpeta as Corey
- Kirk Jones (Sticky Fingaz) as Deuce
- Reagan Gomez-Preston as Beauty
- Cory Hardrict as Smooth
- Maurice McRae as Black
- Lorenzo Eduardo as Long Cuz
- Page Kennedy as Aub
- Ricky Harris as Faze Disco
- Richard Brooks as Detective Nichols
- Cooper Harris as Detective Rice
- Gabriel Casseus as Simuel
- Kel Mitchell as Reggie
- Leonard A. Anderson as Officer White
- Mirtha Michelle as Selecia
- Tina Huang as Zena

== Production ==
The film was produced and written by Preston A. Whitmore II. It is the first feature film from director Nicholas Harvell and the inaugural feature from Whitmore’s “Give Back” program. Bonnie Berry LaMon serves as executive producer.

== Release ==
BET purchased the rights to the film after production. The film was first screened at a Laemmle Theatre in Los Angeles, and Paramount released it on DVD.

== Reception ==
Black film gave it a negative review, saying: "Dough Boys is a testosterone-fueled saga ostensibly designed to match the taste of fans of those musical glorification of misogyny, materialism and black-on-black crime popularized by the network." Another review, on DVD Talk, was also very negative.

== See also ==
- List of hood films
