= Legends of Tomorrow season 2 =

Legends of Tomorrow
- Season 2
- Home media cover
- Starring: Victor Garber; Brandon Routh; Arthur Darvill; Caity Lotz; Franz Drameh; Matt Letscher; Maisie Richardson-Sellers; Amy Pemberton; Nick Zano; Dominic Purcell
- No. of episodes: 17

Release
- Original network: The CW
- Original release: October 13, 2016 – April 4, 2017

Season chronology
- ← Previous; Season 1 Next → Season 3

The second season of the American television series Legends of Tomorrow, which is based on characters from DC Comics, premiered on The CW on October 13, 2016, and ran for 17 episodes until April 4, 2017. The season follows the Legends, a dysfunctional team of time-traveling superheroes and anti-heroes, and their mission to correct aberrations in time resulting from their first mission together. The show is a spin-off of Arrow and The Flash; its setting is the Arrowverse and it shares continuity with other television series that are set there. The show's second season was produced by Berlanti Productions, Warner Bros. Television, and DC Entertainment. Phil Klemmer was the showrunner.

The season was ordered in March 2016, and production began that July and ended in February 2017. The show's principal cast members Victor Garber, Brandon Routh, Arthur Darvill, Caity Lotz, Franz Drameh, Amy Pemberton, and Dominic Purcell return from the previous season, and are joined by new cast members Maisie Richardson-Sellers, Nick Zano, and The Flash alum Matt Letscher.

== Episodes ==
Season two episode
No. overall	No. in season	Title	Directed by	Written by	Original release date	Prod. code	U.S. viewers (millions)
17	1	"Out of Time"	Dermott Downs	Story by : Greg Berlanti & Chris Fedak; Teleplay by : Marc Guggenheim & Phil Klemmer	October 13, 2016	T13.20001	1.82
In 2016, the historian Nate Heywood enlists Mayor Oliver Queen's help in locating the Waverider after it was caught in a nuclear blast in 1942. They find the ship submerged with only Mick in stasis aboard; he is revived and reveals what happened. Rip's team—Mick, Ray, Sara, Jax, and Martin—traveled through time dealing with "aberrations" in history. They encountered Justice Society of America (JSA) member Rex Tyler, who warned them not to travel to 1942 then vanished. After learning a nuclear bomb would be detonated in New York City in 1942, the Legends ignored the warning and discovered Damien Darhk working with the Nazis, was behind the attack. Sara attempted to kill Darhk to avenge Laurel, but Darhk escaped and launched his atomic bomb toward New York from a U-boat. Rip scattered the team, except for the injured Mick, throughout time to save their lives while he intercepted the bomb with the Waverider. In the present, Mick and Nate use the Waverider to travel through time and rescue everyone but fail to locate Rip. After preventing the Nazis from obtaining a nuclear bomb in 1942, the team is confronted by the JSA. Meanwhile, Darhk is shown to be working with Eobard Thawne.
18	2	"The Justice Society of America"	Michael Grossman	Chris Fedak & Sarah Nicole Jones	October 20, 2016	T13.20002	1.80
The JSA captures the team, believing them to be Nazi spies, and Rex has no memory of meeting them. Nate reveals he is the JSA member Commander Steel's grandson. The JSA is assigned to track the Nazi captain Baron Krieger; they release the team and advise them to leave 1942. The JSA learns Krieger intends to trade a mystical amulet; his trade partner is Eobard, who intends to barter with a serum, a sample of which he has given to Krieger. Nate discovers the JSA dies on this mission so the team returns to rescue them. While the teams collect the amulet, Krieger uses the serum on himself and turns into a monstrous superhuman. Krieger captures Ray and Amaya. Ray offers to replicate the serum formula to save Amaya. The teams rescue Ray and Amaya, and defeat Krieger. Nate, a hemophiliac, is injured in the fighting but is saved by a modified version of the serum Ray has created. Before the team departs, Eobard steals the amulet from JSA headquarters and stabs Rex to erase him from the timeline before he can discover Eobard's plan, as he did in a previous encounter. A dying Rex whispers "time traveler" to Amaya.
19	3	"Shogun"	Kevin Tancharoen	Phil Klemmer & Grainne Godfree	October 27, 2016	T13.20003	1.75
Amaya stows away on the Waverider and attacks Mick, believing him to be responsible for Rex's death. Nate uses his newly-developed ability to convert his body to a steel-like form to stop Amaya. Sara convinces Amaya a rogue time traveler is likely to blame for the murder. An accident during Ray's testing of Nate's abilities throws both men into the time vortex and strands them in 17th-century feudal Japan. Nate is found and cared for by Masako Yamashiro, the betrothed of the shogun Tokugawa Iemitsu. Tokugawa's samurai capture Ray. Sara, Amaya, and Mick rescue Ray from Tokugawa, who uses the Atom suit against them. They meet up with a recovered Nate, who does not want to leave Masako to Tokugawa's mercy. They defend Masako's village from the samurai, while Ray and Nate destroy the Atom suit and defeat Tokugawa. Nate and Amaya officially join the team. Meanwhile, Jax and Stein discover a hidden armory inside the ship and a secret message from Barry Allen from 2056 that is intended for Rip and forbidden from the crew.
20	4	"Abominations"	Michael Allowitz	Marc Guggenheim & Ray Utarnachitt	November 3, 2016	T13.20004	1.75
The team learns of a time pirate who is stranded in the American Civil War. Upon arriving, they encounter a Black man, Henry Scott, who is being chased by Confederate soldiers who have been turned into zombies by a virus carried by the pirate. The team defeats the group of zombies but Henry is killed. Before his death, Henry reveals he is a Union spy assigned to steal Confederate battle plans for General Grant and asks Jax to complete his mission. The team discovers Mick is infected with the virus and returns him to the Waverider, where Ray and Martin eventually cure him. Sara and Nate go to warn Grant about the zombies while Jax and Amaya attempt to steal the plans. Jax runs afoul of a plantation owner and is imprisoned. Amaya frees Jax and the other Black prisoners. They find the plans and burn down the mansion during a zombie attack. Meanwhile, Grant's camp is also attacked by zombies. Sara formulates a successful plan to kill the zombies using Nate's powers. Jax, posing as Henry Scott, gives the plans to Grant, which will ensure a Union battle victory. A grateful Mick gives Leonard Snart's cold gun to Ray.
21	5	"Compromised"	David Geddes	Keto Shimizu & Grainne Godfree	November 10, 2016	T13.20005	1.77
In 1987, Eobard Thawne offers Damien Darhk an alliance, which Darhk declines. Aboard the Waverider, Nate discovers an aberration involving the 1987 INF Treaty signing. The team infiltrates the White House and finds Darhk is one of the treaty negotiators. Sara again attempts to kill Darhk, which alerts White House security and forces the team to make a very public escape. They soon learn Darhk is making a secret deal with the KGB. Returning to the White House during a state dinner, they discover Darhk and H.I.V.E. making an exchange with KGB agents for a box with an unknown item. The team defeats the H.I.V.E soldiers and the Russians. Sara confronts Darhk but spares his life. Instead, she reveals his future to torture him: his master plan's failure, his wife's murder, and his own eventual death. Sara steals the box from Darkh and Eobard whisks him away. Sara realizes the team is opposing a time-traveling speedster. Unnerved by Sara's revelation, Darhk insists on teaming up with Eobard and they enter the time stream.
22	6	"Outlaw Country"	Cherie Nowlan	Matthew Maala & Chris Fedak	November 17, 2016	T13.20006	1.85
The team learns of an aberration in Colorado in 1874, where they save Jonah Hex from execution. Jonah reveals he is fighting an outlaw boss named Quentin Turnbull. Nate reveals the aberration is Turnbull leading the Western US in its secession to form "Turnbull Country". The team learns Turnbull is extracting a dwarf star, which Ray used for his A.T.O.M. suit, and that Turnbull is planning to destroy a critical mountain pass connecting the Eastern US to the West, stopping the US Army from supplying the West. While Sara and Jonah engage Turnbull, Mick and Amaya destroy the mine, and Nate uses his powers to stop the train. Instead of killing Turnbull, Jonah decides to deliver him to the authorities. With the dwarf star reappropriated, Ray plans to rebuild his suit. Ray shows Nate the suit he has made for Ray. Amaya decides to teach Mick to control his anger. Martin and Jax deduce due to Martin's interaction with his past self, he may have altered the past. Sara tells the team they need to return to 2016 to help their friends.
23	7	"Invasion!"	Gregory Smith	Story by : Greg Berlanti; Teleplay by : Phil Klemmer & Marc Guggenheim	December 1, 2016	T13.20007	3.39
Nate, Mick, Amaya, Felicity, and Cisco travel back to the first Dominator invasion of Earth in Redmond, Oregon, in 1951. The Legends capture a Dominator for information but are captured by Men in black (MIB) as well as the Dominator. While in custody, they learn from the Dominator the aliens arrived to assess the threat humanity posed now metahumans have appeared. Felicity and Cisco rescue the Legends and help free the Dominator. Meanwhile in Central City in 2016, the team learns the Dominators know about Barry's manipulation of the timeline and that they demand his surrender in exchange for peace. After the Legends return, the team discovers the Dominators' weapon is a bomb that will kill all metahumans on Earth and millions of humans. The team dissuades Barry from surrendering and Cisco reconciles with him. They destroy the bomb and force the Dominators to retreat using pain-inflicting nanotechnology. Cisco gives Supergirl a device to travel between their universes. Martin persuades Jax not to tell the others his daughter Lily is an aberration of the timeline. Note : This episode concludes a crossover event that begins on The Flash season 3 episode 8 and continues on Arrow season 5 episode 8.
24	8	"The Chicago Way"	Ralph Hemecker	Sarah Nicole Jones & Ray Utarnachitt	December 8, 2016	T13.20008	2.00
Eobard, Darhk and Malcolm Merlyn arrive in Chicago in 1927, and ally with Al Capone and his empire. Learning of the aberration, the Legends arrive and keep Capone from murdering Eliot Ness. Ness is critically injured so the team decides to obtain vital information on Capone's operation to secure history. Meanwhile, Mick begins having hallucinations of Snart, who belittles him for acting like his teammates. Eobard abducts Sara and Martin during their infiltration and raid on Capone's club. Malcolm offers Sara a chance to change her past in return for the amulet she took from Darhk in 1987, but she refuses. The team rescues the captives but "Martin" is found to be Eobard in disguise, who searches the Waverider at super-speed for the amulet while Malcolm and Capone's men directly attack the ship. Eobard barely escapes revenge at Amaya's hand. Sara surrenders the amulet for Martin's safety. The Legends succeed in correcting the timeline. Eobard later shows his partners the completed amulet projects a holographic map that can locate the Spear of Destiny, which is able to rewrite reality. They must next locate Rip Hunter, who is revealed to be working as a movie director in 1967 in Los Angeles.
25	9	"Raiders of the Lost Art"	Dermott Downs	Keto Shimizu & Chris Fedak	January 24, 2017	T13.20009	1.74
During the New York attack, Rip recovered the Spear of Destiny from the Waverider and used the time drive to escape. In the present, the team learns about the spear and arrives in 1967 in Los Angeles, where they find Darhk and Malcolm attempting to kidnap Rip, who has no memories of his previous adventures and is filming with George Lucas. Both parties escape and police arrest Rip, believing he started the fight. The team releases him from custody and takes him to the Waverider. Nate and Ray lose their specialities and powers since the aberration caused Lucas to quit filmmaking. While Nate, Amaya, and Ray meet Lucas to dissuade him from dropping out of school, the others learn Lucas had a fragment of the spear. Darhk and Malcolm overpower Amaya's party and force them to search for the fragment in a dumpster. The others arrive and a battle ensues, during which they recover the fragment and the Medallion. Eobard abducts Rip and threatens him with torture. Lucas returns to filmmaking and the team vows to rescue Rip. Meanwhile, Mick tells Stein about his hallucinations but Stein interprets them to be emotional, not neural.
26	10	"The Legion of Doom"	Eric Laneuville	Phil Klemmer & Marc Guggenheim	January 31, 2017	T13.20010	1.78
In Star City in 2016, Eobard and Damien recruit Malcolm just moments after Oliver kills the 2016 Damien. (Note: As depicted in "Schism".) The Legion's attempts to extract information from Rip fail, exacerbating tensions within the group. Eobard disappears after insisting on his superiority, assigning the others to access Rip's bank safe deposit box in Switzerland in 2025. Meanwhile, Martin recruits Lily to help the team decode the amulet. Lily finds out she is an aberration and gets angry with Martin. After a failed robbery, Malcolm and Damien decide to work together against Eobard. The Legends realize the mystery speedster is Eobard and that he needs the spear to undo his removal from existence. Damien and Malcolm break into the bank vault and find a record of Rip's memories. They force Eobard to tell the truth about his disappearances. Eobard reveals Hunter Zolomon, now the undead speedster Black Flash, has been chasing him since Flashpoint. They trap the pursuing speedster in the vault and escape, with Eobard agreeing to treat the duo as his equals. Lily returns home after she and Martin reconcile, while the Legion restores Rip's memories, albeit with adjustments. In New Jersey on December 25, 1776, Rip kills George Washington.
27	11	"Turncoat"	Alice Troughton	Grainne Godfree & Matthew Maala	February 7, 2017	T13.20011	1.77
Rip has been brainwashed into working for the Legion. The Legends, who feel the subsequent timequake, head to December 24, 1776, to protect Washington. As Sara and Mick escort Washington to safety, Rip arrives with British troops who have been armed with modern-day assault rifles. Rip disables the team's technology, shoots Sara in the chest, and takes Mick and Washington prisoner. Rip then heads to the Waverider with British soldiers to retrieve the Legends' piece of the spear. After Mick hears Washington will be executed in the morning, he plans an escape and teaches the General what it means to be an American. Rip uses Sara's life as leverage to obtain the spear fragment from Jax then strangles her. The Waverider's power is restored and Sara is revived in time to stop an enraged Jax from killing Rip. Nate and Amaya save Mick and Washington, who goes on to lead his soldiers to victory in the American Revolution. Amaya tells Nate, with whom she shared a tender moment earlier, they should remain friends. The team celebrates Christmas on the Waverider.
28	12	"Camelot/3000"	Antonio Negret	Anderson Mackenzie	February 21, 2017	T13.20012	1.64
Rip finds former JSA member Dr. Mid-Nite in Detroit in 3000, kills him and takes his spear fragment. Gideon locates the next fragment in England in 507, the age of King Arthur. Amaya recognizes Merlin as Stargirl, her former comrade in the JSA. Stargirl explains Hunter joined the JSA on their final mission to secure the spear and divided it into four pieces for more safety. The Legion abducts Arthur and controls his mind using a device taken from 3000 to enter Camelot, threatening to destroy it unless the spear is brought to them. Sara persuades Guinevere to help them fight back while Amaya persuades Stargirl, who is in love with Arthur, to entrust her with the fragment. Upon learning Ray has joined Guinevere's army, the team devises a plan to reverse the effects of the device, and Arthur subdues Rip. Ray engages Damien and is shot but survives due to his suit's armor. In the changed history, Ray is revealed to have become a knight. Rip is imprisoned in the brig; he contacts Gideon, whose programming maintains loyalty to him.
29	13	"Land of the Lost"	Ralph Hemecker	Keto Shimizu & Ray Utarnachitt	March 7, 2017	T13.20013	1.54
Rip issues an override order to activate the Waverider's self-destruct sequence but the team reboots Gideon and stops it. They crash land in the Cretaceous period and Ray, Amaya, and Nate venture out to recover a lost timeship part. Mick suggests using a Time Master method of mental programming to travel inside Rip's mind and discover the location of Commander Steel and the final piece of the spear. Sara and Jax travel inside Rip's mind, encountering Savage's men, evil versions of themselves, Gideon in human form, and a trapped Rip. Ray, Nate, and Amaya retrieve the missing part. Nate and Amaya start to develop mutual feelings. Ray advises against this, reminding Nate Amaya's granddaughter will eventually inherit her abilities. Sara, Jax, and Gideon free Rip's consciousness before Sara and Jax return to reality. Rip shares a kiss with the human Gideon before returning to reality and resuming his role as Captain, informing the team he knows the location of the last piece of the spear. Meanwhile in 1970, Jack Swigert, Apollo 13's Command Module Pilot, has a meeting with a doctor, who revealed to be Thawne.
30	14	"Moonshot"	Kevin Mock	Grainne Godfree	March 14, 2017	T13.20014	1.34
The Legends head to NASA in 1970, where Henry Heywood works as a consultant. Henry reveals he hid his spear fragment in the flag the Apollo 11 astronauts left on the moon, and that the Apollo 13 mission is going exactly as planned. Thawne, posing as Jack Swigert, incapacitates the other astronauts. Ray boards the Apollo command module, restrains Thawne, and retrieves the spear fragment. The Waverider is damaged when Sara uses the ship to shield the Apollo craft from meteors, stranding Ray on the moon. Ray and Thawne launch themselves off the moon and are caught by the Waverider. The team returns to Earth intact after Henry sacrifices himself by opening one of the Waverider's outer hatches and being sucked outside the ship. Nate, disappointed he was not able to create a potentially better life for his family, passes on a message from Henry to his teenage father. Sara and Rip seem to clash over how to captain the ship but eventually reach an understanding. Amaya asks Gideon to show her the fate of her village and her family, revealing the destruction of her village and existence of her granddaughter Mari, the present-day Vixen.
31	15	"Fellowship of the Spear"	Ben Bray	Keto Shimizu & Matthew Maala	March 21, 2017	T13.20015	1.72
The Legends steal the remaining spear fragment. The spear becomes whole again and its writings reveal it can be destroyed by the blood of Jesus Christ. Rip prevents the Waverider from traveling to the Crucifixion, warning going back to such a significant event is too risky. Nate reveals J. R. R. Tolkien researched Sir Gawain, who supposedly possessed some of Christ's blood. They find Tolkien at the Battle of the Somme. Tolkien takes the Legends to a grave, where they are attacked by Darhk and a past version of Snart, who has been recruited to the Legion. Tolkien acquires a map before escaping with the others. Amaya, tempted by the Spear's power, suggests using it to erase the Legion from reality, but the idea is rejected. Using the map and the spear, the Legends acquire the blood. Darhk and Snart confront the Legends are persuade Mick to join them, bringing the spear with him. The Legion escapes and the Legends return to the Waverider and discuss the possibility they may not know how to use the spear. Malcolm returns to the Legion with the Kalebros Manuscript, which they use to activate the spear.
32	16	"Doomworld"	Mairzee Almas	Ray Utarnachitt & Sarah Hernandez	March 28, 2017	T13.20016	1.59
In the new reality, Thawne is the CEO of S.T.A.R. Labs and has captured the Black Flash, Darhk is the corrupt mayor of Star City, Merlyn gets his hand back and his family is alive, and Snart and Rory control Central City but still answer to Thawne as their superior. Ray, Stein, and Jax work in S.T.A.R. Labs, where Jax abuses Stein. Sara and Amaya work as Darhk's enforcers, and Nate is a conspiracy theorist. Thawne holds Rip prisoner onboard the Waverider; Rip is the only member of the Legends to be unaffected by the changes to the timeline. Mick, unsatisfied with this reality, takes Nate to re-assemble the Legends and uses a gun Ray created to restore the Legends' memories. The Legends attempt to reclaim the Spear before Thawne can destroy it. Darhk, Merlyn, and Snart ally against Thawne to take the Spear for themselves. In the ensuing fight, Snart kills Amaya and Thawne destroys the Spear, cementing the new reality. The Legends decide to stop the Legion by travelling to 1916 and taking the Spear before the Legion does. Rip and the Waverider are shown to be miniaturized on Thawne's desk.
33	17	"Aruba"	Rob Seidenglanz	Phil Klemmer & Marc Guggenheim	April 4, 2017	T13.20017	1.52
Ray de-miniaturizes the Waverider and the team returns to 1916 to steal the Spear. Thawne arrives from the altered reality, destroys the blood of Christ, kills "future Ray", and informs the past Legion members about the future Legends. The Legends interact with their past selves and the resulting time storm prevents the use of the Waverider for escape. Shortly after, Merlyn, Darhk, and Snart ambush the Legends. During the subsequent battle, the future Legends except Sara and Rip are killed, while the past Legends incapacitate the Legion. Thawne arrives with numerous time remnants of himself to fight the team, killing future Rip. Sara takes the Spear and consults a manifestation of Laurel. Eobard steals and attempts to use the Spear but learns Sara depowered it and released the Black Flash. Eobard and future Sara are erased from existence, along with the Spear of Destiny. Nate persuades Amaya to stay, while Rip leaves the team. The Legends leave the Legion in their respective places throughout the timeline and, at Mick's request, set off for Aruba. However, they arrive in Los Angeles, where dinosaurs are in the streets and buildings from other points of history are present.

== Cast and characters ==
=== Main ===
- Victor Garber as Martin Stein / Firestorm
- Brandon Routh as Ray Palmer / Atom
- Arthur Darvill as Rip Hunter (Note: Darvill is only credited in the episodes he appears in.)
- Caity Lotz as Sara Lance / White Canary
- Franz Drameh as Jefferson "Jax" Jackson / Firestorm
- Matt Letscher as Eobard Thawne / Reverse-Flash (Note: Letscher is only credited in the episodes he appears in.)
- Maisie Richardson-Sellers as Amaya Jiwe / Vixen
- Amy Pemberton as Gideon
- Nick Zano as Nate Heywood / Steel
- Dominic Purcell as Mick Rory / Heat Wave

=== Recurring ===
- Neal McDonough as Damien Darhk
- John Barrowman as Malcolm Merlyn / Dark Archer
- Wentworth Miller as Leonard Snart / Captain Cold

=== Guest ===
- Stephen Amell as Oliver Queen / Green Arrow
- John Rubinstein as Albert Einstein
- Matthew MacCaull as Henry Heywood, Sr. / Commander Steel
- Kwesi Ameyaw as Charles / Dr. Mid-Nite
- Sarah Grey as Courtney / Stargirl
- Patrick J. Adams as Rex Tyler / Hourman
- André Eriksen as Baron Krieger
- Dan Payne as Todd Rice / Obsidian
  - Lance Henriksen portrays an older version of the character
- Mei Melançon as Masako Yamashiro
- Christopher Naoki Lee as Head Samurai
- Sab Shimono as Ichiro Yamashiro
- Stephen Oyoung as Tokugawa Iemitsu
- Grant Gustin as Barry Allen / Flash
- John Churchill as Ulysses S. Grant
- Dean S. Jagger as Daniel Collins
- Graeme McComb as young Martin Stein
- Emily Tennant as Clarissa Stein
- Johnathon Schaech as Jonah Hex
- Christina Brucato as Lily Stein
- Jeff Fahey as Quentin Turnbull
- David Ramsey as John Diggle / Spartan
- Emily Bett Rickards as Felicity Smoak / Overwatch
- Danielle Panabaker as Caitlin Snow
- Carlos Valdes as Cisco Ramon
- Melissa Benoist as Kara Danvers / Supergirl
- Donnelly Rhodes as Agent Smith / Glasses
  - Jacob Richtor portrays a younger version of the character
- Lucia Walters as Susan Brayden
- Isaac Keoughan as Al Capone
- Cole Vigue as Eliot Ness
- Matt Angel as George Lucas
- Randall Batinkoff as George Washington
- Elyse Levesque as Guinevere
- Nils Hognestad as King Arthur
- Jack Turner as J. R. R. Tolkien
- Katie Cassidy as Laurel Lance

== Production ==
=== Development ===
On March 11, 2016, Legends of Tomorrow was renewed for a second season. The producers considered adjusting the Legends team for additional seasons with Joseph David-Jones as Connor Hawke and Megalyn Echikunwoke as Mari McCabe / Vixen as potential additions. For the second season, the showrunner Phil Klemmer announced Arrow writer Keto Shimizu and The Flash writer Grainne Godfree would be working on the show to "make our stories work in concert" with Arrow and The Flash. Klemmer also talked about the challenges of creating more crossover elements because Arrow's lead actor Stephen Amell and The Flash's lead actor Grant Gustin work full days for their shows. Klemmer said to work within the Arrowverse, the death of Laurel Lance on Arrow would "resonate into Season 2 ... [because] something that happens on Arrow can create ripples that appear on our show in a huge way. It fundamentally alters the DNA of our series." The second season initially consisted of 13 episodes, and four more were ordered in November 2016 to bring the season total to 17.

Teasing the premise of season two in April 2016, Klemmer stated:

We're coming at it from a completely different angle. We're determined to make every part of season two feel like its own show. [The first episode of season two] will very much be a new pilot with new good guys, new bad guys, new stakes, new dynamics, new goals. The team will basically have to find a new purpose. Once you save the world, what do you do then? ... The fact that the world was in peril sort of forced our team to fall into its own dysfunctional version of lockstep. Season two, they're no longer going to be hunted by Time Masters. They're no longer going to be burdened with having to save the world. It's no longer going to be about saving Miranda and Jonas. The interesting thing about season two is I think it's going to have a much, much different tone because our Legends are going to have a totally different purpose. They're actually going to have a totally different constitution. There will be new faces and new everything.

The season introduced members of the Justice Society of America (JSA), consisting of Hourman, Vixen, Commander Steel, Obsidian, Stargirl, and Dr. Mid-Nite. The season also includes a version of the Legion of Doom that consists of Eobard Thawne / Reverse-Flash, Malcolm Merlyn, Damien Darhk and Leonard Snart / Captain Cold.

=== Casting ===
The series' main cast members Victor Garber, Brandon Routh, Arthur Darvill, Caity Lotz, Franz Drameh, Amy Pemberton, and Dominic Purcell returned for the second season as Martin Stein, Ray Palmer, Rip Hunter, Sara Lance, Jefferson Jackson, Gideon, and Mick Rory, respectively. They were joined by Matt Letscher as Eobard Thawne, Maisie Richardson-Sellers as Amaya Jiwe, and Nick Zano as Nate Heywood, respectively. Letscher reprised his role from The Flash. It was originally intended for Megalyn Echikunwoke, who voices Mari McCabe / Vixen in the animated web series Vixen, to reprise her role in this series but due to scheduling conflicts for Echikunwoke, the producers cast Sellers as Jiwe—McCabe's grandmother and an earlier incarnation of Vixen. This incarnation was an original creation for the series. Darvill is absent from five episodes this season due to his commitment to the ITV series Broadchurch. Pemberton portrayed Gideon on-screen in the episode "Land of the Lost", whereas in earlier episodes she only voiced the character.

Wentworth Miller, who portrayed Leonard Snart / Captain Cold in season one, signed a contract with Warner Bros. TV to continue portraying Snart simultaneously on shows in the Arrowverse, including Legends of Tomorrow. John Barrowman who played Malcolm Merlyn and Katie Cassidy who portrayed Laurel Lance in Arrow, signed a similar contract that allowed them to continue being a series regular on Arrow and other Arrowverse shows, including The Flash and Legends of Tomorrow. Neal McDonough, who played Damien Darhk on Arrow and made a guest appearance in season one of Legends of Tomorrow, returned to the series in a recurring capacity. Ciara Renée and Falk Hentschel, who starred as Kendra Saunders / Hawkgirl and Carter Hall / Hawkman respectively, in the first season, did not return for the second. The Legends of Tomorrow co-creator Marc Guggenheim said the writers could not find a suitable story for their characters after the first season, adding: "The bow was tied so tightly and neatly with their story in the finale, that everything we thought of felt very forced. After 4,000 years, they were no longer under the specter of Vandal [Savage], and we felt they need some time off." He added bringing the duo back at the beginning of the second season felt "premature".

=== Filming ===
Filming for the show's second season began in July 2016 at Vancouver, Canada, and ended in February 2017.

=== Arrowverse tie-ins ===
In November 2016, the cast of Legends of Tomorrow appeared on The Flash and Arrow as part of the three-part crossover event "Invasion!". The crossover episodes also featured appearances by Melissa Benoist, reprising her role as Kara Danvers / Supergirl from the television series Supergirl.

== Release ==
=== Broadcast ===
The season began airing on October 13, 2016, on The CW in the United States, and concluded on April 4, 2017.

=== Home media ===
The season was made available for streaming on Netflix in late April 2017, soon after the season finale aired. It was later released on Blu-ray on August 15, 2017.

== Reception ==
=== Ratings ===
Viewership and ratings per episode of Legends of Tomorrow season 2
No.	Title	Air date	Rating/share (18–49)	Viewers (millions)	DVR (18–49)	DVR viewers (millions)	Total (18–49)	Total viewers (millions)
1	"Out of Time"	October 13, 2016	0.6/2	1.82	0.6	1.19	1.2	3.01
2	"The Justice Society of America"	October 20, 2016	0.7/2	1.80	—N/a	1.03	—N/a	2.83
3	"Shogun"	October 27, 2016	0.6/2	1.75	0.4	0.96	1.0	2.71
4	"Abominations"	November 3, 2016	0.6/2	1.75	0.4	0.99	1.0	2.74
5	"Compromised"	November 10, 2016	0.6/2	1.77	0.4	0.98	1.0	2.75
6	"Outlaw Country"	November 17, 2016	0.6/2	1.85	0.5	—N/a	1.1	—N/a
7	"Invasion!"	December 1, 2016	1.2/4	3.39	0.7	1.84	1.9	5.24
8	"The Chicago Way"	December 8, 2016	0.7/3	2.00	0.5	1.17	1.2	3.17
9	"Raiders of the Lost Art"	January 24, 2017	0.6/2	1.74	—N/a	1.14	—N/a	2.94
10	"The Legion of Doom"	January 31, 2017	0.7/3	1.78	0.5	1.19	1.2	2.96
11	"Turncoat"	February 7, 2017	0.7/3	1.77	—N/a	1.10	—N/a	2.87
12	"Camelot/3000"	February 21, 2017	0.6/2	1.64	0.5	1.06	1.1	2.70
13	"Land of the Lost"	March 7, 2017	0.5/2	1.54	0.5	1.07	1.0	2.61
14	"Moonshot"	March 14, 2017	0.5/2	1.34	0.3	1.01	0.8	2.35
15	"Fellowship of the Spear"	March 21, 2017	0.6/2	1.72	—N/a	0.98	—N/a	2.70
16	"Doomworld"	March 28, 2017	0.5/2	1.59	0.5	1.01	1.0	2.60
17	"Aruba"	April 4, 2017	0.6/2	1.52	—N/a	0.87	—N/a	2.39

=== Critical response ===
The review-aggregating website Rotten Tomatoes gave the season an 88% approval rating, with an average rating of 6.97/10 based on 166 reviews. The website's consensus reads: "Though the narrative remains too ambitious, DC's Legends of Tomorrow enjoys a freer creative arc with the removal of problem characters". Jesse Schedeen of IGN called the show's second season a significant improvement over the first, saying it reduced "most of what didn't work about Season 1 and added several worthy new characters to the mix." He noted while the season is "crammed full of compelling character arcs and plot twists", it thrived simply by "offering a sense of whimsical adventure and comedy that be frustratingly hard to find in other live-action DC projects". Caitlin Kelly of Hypable wrote Season 2 works so well because of its new roster, the evolving dynamics of its main characters, great villains, and the fun, which made it easier to not care about plot holes. Several years later, Matthew Sonnack of CBR called Season 2 the best of Legends of Tomorrow, "with the perfect balance of action, humor, drama, and heart".

=== Accolades ===
Award nominations for Legends of Tomorrow, season 2
Year	Award	Category	Nominee(s)	Result	Ref.
2017	Leo Awards	Best Direction in a Dramatic Series	David Geddes	Nominated	
2017	Leo Awards	Best Visual Effects in a Dramatic Series	Armen V. Kevorkian, Meagan Condito, Rick Ramirez, Andranik Taranyan, James Rorick	Nominated	
2017	Leo Awards	Best Sound in a Dramatic Series	Kristian Bailey	Won	
2017	Teen Choice Awards	Choice TV Actress: Action	Caity Lotz	Nominated	
