= Meteor Apocalypse =

- Directed by: Micho Rutare
- Written by: Micho Rutare; Brian Brinkman
- Produced by: David Michael Latt; David Rimawi; Paul Bales
- Starring: Joe Lando; Claudia Christian; Cooper Harris
- Cinematography: Adam Silver
- Edited by: Danny Maldonado
- Music by: Douglas Edward
- Production company: The Asylum
- Release date: February 23, 2010
- Running time: 90 minutes
- Country: United States
- Language: English

Meteor Apocalypse is a 2010 American direct-to-video science fiction film directed by Micho Rutare.

== Plot ==
A long-period comet is determined to be on a collision course with Earth. All of the world's nuclear states fire intercontinental ballistic missiles at the comet but only succeed in breaking it into fragments. Pieces of the comet soon begin to impact the ground.

Research scientist David Dmatti (Joe Lando) is asleep when his co-worker Mark calls him and requests urgent help. He arrives at his workplace to find Mark suffering from convulsions. David realizes that there are toxins in the water. Mark dies before David narrowly avoids a meteor shower that kills the paramedics and destroys his work site.

David's daughter Alison (Madison McLaughlin) also becomes ill after drinking the water. Afterwards, the United States government discovers that the comet carries a deadly pathogen that has contaminated Lake Mead and orders a quarantine. David is separated from wife Kate (Claudia Christian) and Alison as they are taken away. He escapes from the troops and makes his way to the Las Vegas Valley to find a colleague who is working on an antidote.

On the way to Las Vegas, David finds and revives an unconscious young woman named Lynn (Cooper Harris) at a gas station. He learns that she is also suffering from the illness and brings her with him. When they arrive, they watch as most of the city is destroyed by a meteor shower and learn the quarantined were transferred to Los Angeles. David is able to get an experimental antidote for the mysterious illness and gives some of it to Lynn.

When it is discovered that the largest comet fragment will most likely hit Los Angeles, a panicked evacuation is begun. The United States Secretary of Homeland Security cancels the evacuation to conserve resources, but his team defies his order and continues to assist with the evacuation. A pastor convinces David and Lynn to seek shelter for the night at her church before they leave the next day. David uses the experimental antidote to save a girl, and learns from her mother about a location where his wife and daughter might be. He and Lynn narrowly escape as more meteorites destroy the church.

Lynn dies from her illness after having saved the antidote for Alison. David overcomes his fear of heights and scales a steep cliff to find his wife and daughter. He uses the antidote to treat Alison's illness, and the three watch from a safe distance as the final fragment strikes the city.

== Cast ==
- Gregory Paul Smith as Damien
- Joe Lando as David Dematti
- Claudia Christian as Kate Dematti
- Cooper Harris as Lynn Leigh
- Brendan Andolsek Bradley as Curtis Langley
- Sueann Han as Candace Mills
- Madison McLaughlin as Alison DeMatti
- Peter Husmann as Jack Nielson
- Jennifer Smart as Madeline
- David Dustin Kenyon as Dustin Landau, Marauder

== Production ==
The film is produced and is distributed by The Asylum Films.

== Release ==
The release date for the film in North America was February 23, 2010
