= Cooper Harris =

American entrepreneur and actress

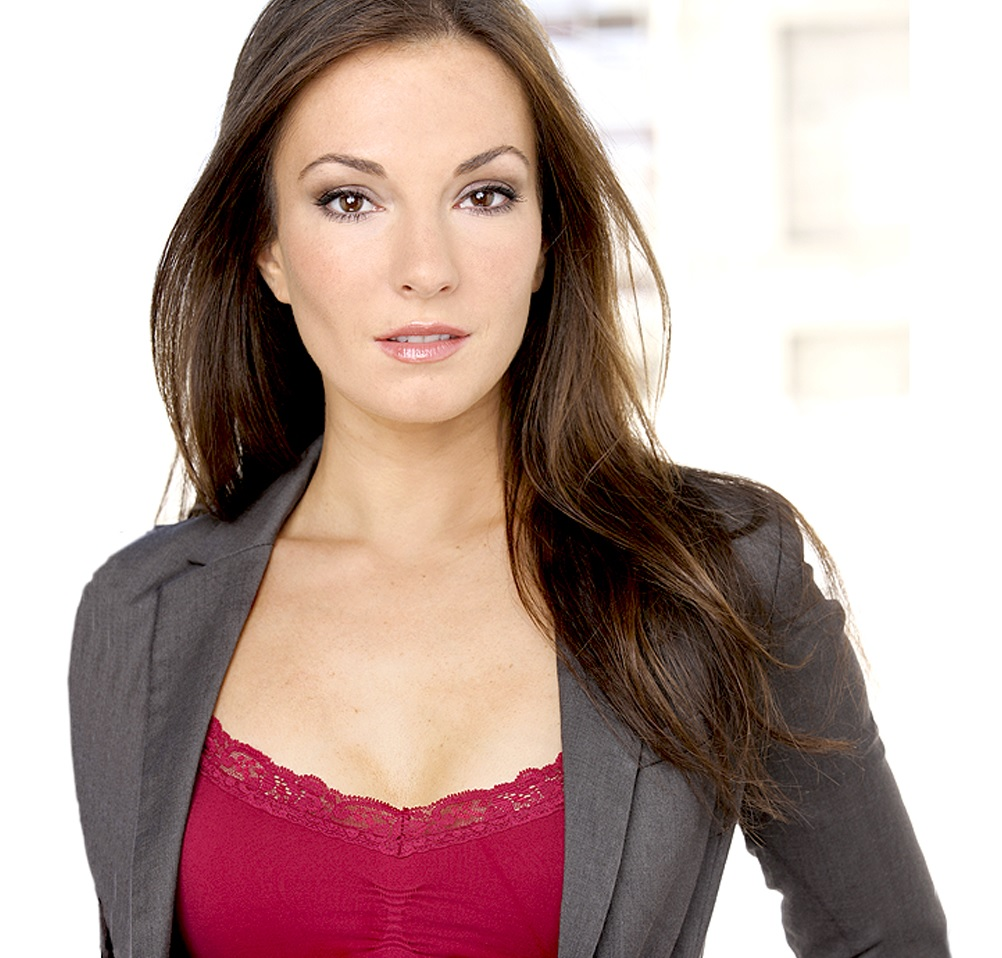
- Education: University of North Carolina School of the Arts
- Occupations: C.E.O., Actress
- Known for: Klickly (Founder), Meteor Apocalypse (Actress)

Cooper Harris is an American entrepreneur and actress. She is currently the CEO & founder of Klickly, a payments platform, based in Venice, California. Harris had a career as an actress on such TV shows like Young and the Restless and As the World Turns, among others.

Cooper was also the Director of Tech for Collective Summit and produced the first-ever Innovation Summit and Social-Impact Hackathon during Sundance. Her team won the Los Angeles AT&T Hackathon.

== Career ==
=== As an actress ===
Upon her move to New York City Harris was cast in the soap opera, As the World Turns. After her role on the TV Harris stepped in to play a leading role in an off-Broadway play at the Cherry Lane Theater. Shortly after the show closed, Harris moved to Los Angeles and into a role in a Paramount film called Dough Boys, which was her entrée into the Hollywood entertainment scene.

=== As a Tech Entrepreneur ===
During her stint on Young and the Restless, Cooper became interested in entrepreneurship and started attending hackathons. Having grown up with a brother who was a computer engineer and a father who was a serial entrepreneur, Harris stated that she was interested in a field that would allow both creativity and the ability to control her own destiny.

Harris won the AT&T Hackathon in Los Angeles, and shortly thereafter build the first Innovation and Tech Summit during the Sundance film festival, called Collective. As part of this initiative, she co-founded Hackdance, a social impact hackathon that brought celebrities together to create apps or platforms that would change the world for the better. Cooper then went on to judge and produce the South by Southwest Hackathon, a hackathon for PBS, and the BritWeek children’s hackathon.

In her first startup, a digital production company, she created and sold her own shows & content to companies such as Post It Notes, Kimberly Clark, DailyMotion & studio production giant, Endemol.

Cooper is a favorite speaker at international summits including the Consumer Electronics Show, Cannes Lions International Festival of Creativity, South by Southwest, ShopTalk, Sundance Film Festival, Los Angeles TechWeek, London Tech Conference, and more, speaking on Marketing Technology / Retail Tech / Financial Technology, fostering women in Science, technology, engineering, and mathematics, and disrupting the status quo using technology and innovation.

== Philanthropy and Charity ==
Previously, as the Executive Director of the Oasis Foundation, Cooper oversaw initiatives to foster innovation & entrepreneurship. She is also a mentor at Network For Teaching Entrepreneurship (NFTE), which teaches kids entrepreneurship in schools. Cooper speaks on being a Woman in Tech and the intersection of Entertainment & Tech at venues such as the CES Conference, USC, SXSW, Silicon Beach Fest, iMedia Summit, General Assembly, Wonder Woman Tech Summit, Sundance, and more, and produced a media-based Hackathon for PBS.

Cooper is on the Board of the non-profit organization Hidden Voices.

== Awards and honours ==
- 2017 Cannes Lions "Top Thought Leader"
- L'Oreal's "Digital Woman of the Year"
- UKTI Innovation Award, alongside Will.I.Am
- Cooper is a member of YEC (Young Entrepreneurs Council) and sits on the board of Hidden Voices, a non-profit organization tell the stories of homeless, imprisoned or immigrant people underrepresented by mainstream media.
