= Madison McLaughlin =

American actress (born 1995)

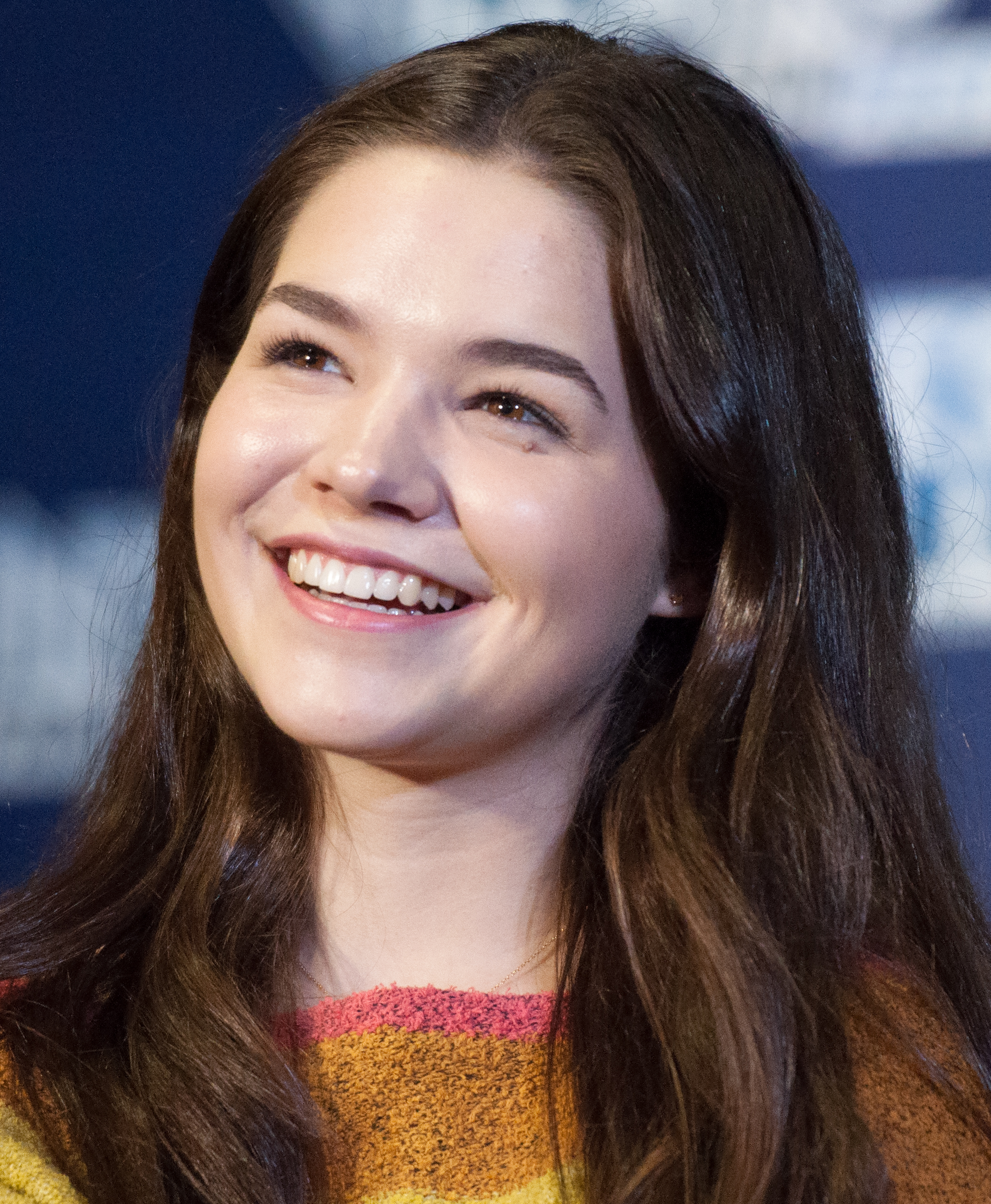
- McLaughlin in 2017
- Born: November 5, 1995 (age 31)
- Occupation: Actress
- Years active: 2009–present

Madison McLaughlin (born November 5, 1995) is an American actress. She is known for playing Evelyn Sharp/Artemis on the CW superhero television series Arrow.

== Early life ==
Madison McLaughlin was born on November 5, 1995, the eldest of four daughters. She lived in Louisiana before relocating to Los Angeles with her family at age 11.

== Career ==
McLaughlin's first notable role was as a guest star on the TV show Supernatural. She has had multiple appearances on the show. In 2013, she also starred in Season 3 of Teen Wolf as Paige Krasikeva.

She's made recurring appearances on the TV show Major Crimes and Chicago P.D.

In 2016, McLaughlin joined the cast of the superhero TV series Arrow, portraying Evelyn Sharp, a troubled teenager introduced in Season 4 Episode 19, “Canary Cry,” where the character briefly assumed the identity of the Black Canary. The role marked a notable milestone in McLaughlin's career. She starred in multiple episodes in Season 5.

In 2020, McLaughlin starred in Lifetime Network's teen thriller Most Likely to Murder and also appeared in a guest role on CW's Roswell, New Mexico.

In 2022, McLaughlin made her directorial debut with the short film "Reaching Athena" for the Easterseals Disability Film Challenge. Her sisters Marissa and Mahrynn starred in the film along with their friend Naomi Rubin, who played the titular role of Athena.

The next year, McLaughlin directed another Easterseals Disability Film Challenge short called "Leap of Love". This film won the Best Awareness Campaign Award.

== Activism ==
McLaughlin serves as the vice president of the MacPac Foundation, a non-profit that raises awareness, funds, and support for research and families affected by hypomyelination with brainstem and spinal cord involvement and leg spasticity (HBSL), a rare genetic leukodystrophy which two of her sisters are afflicted with.

== Filmography ==
Film and Television Roles
| Year | Name | Role | Notes |
|---|---|---|---|
| 2009 | Dangerous Women | Student | |
| 2009 | Don't Touch It | Amy | Short film |
| 2010 | Meteor Apocalypse | Alison DeMatti | Direct-to-video |
| 2010 | Stacy's Mom | Maria | |
| 2010 | Young Again | Jenny | Short film |
| 2010 | Different Worlds | Mean Girl | Short film |
| 2011 | The Revivals | Madison | Short film |
| 2011 | The Mentalist | Annabeth Lisbon | Episode: "Where in the World is Carmine O'Brien?" |
| 2011 | Wasn't Planning on It | Aeryn | Short film |
| 2012 | NCIS | Rosie Martin | Episode: "Gone" |
| 2012 | Isabel | Vivian Dresley | TV movie |
| 2012–2013 | Supernatural | Krissy Chambers | 2 episodes |
| 2013 | Teen Wolf | Paige Krasikeva | Episode: "Visionary" |
| 2013 | Major Crimes | Kris Slater | Recurring role (season 2) |
| 2013 | Modern Family | Sienna | Episode: "A Fair to Remember" |
| 2015 | Mad Men | Sarah | Episode: 'The Forecast' |
| 2015 | Girl Meets World | Jasmine | Episode: "Girl Meets the Tell-Tale-Tot" |
| 2015 | Finding Carter | Olivia | 2 episodes |
| 2015 | Chicago P.D. | Michelle Sovana | Guest episode (season 2), recurring role (season 3) |
| 2016–2017 | Arrow | Evelyn Sharp / Artemis | Guest episode (season 4), recurring role (season 5) |
| 2018 | Code Black | Joy | Episode: "The Business of Saving Lives" |
| 2019 | Most Likely to Murder | Casey | |
| 2019 | Aware I'm Rare | Chloe | Short film; unsold TV pilot |
| 2020 | Roswell, New Mexico | Iris Sanchez | Episode: "Say It Ain't So" |
| 2022 | The Blank's YPF | Louisa | Episode: "Week 1" |
| 2023 | Sun Moon | Liz | |
