= Sins of the Father (Arrow) =

- Arrow episode
- Episode no.: Season 4 Episode 13
- Directed by: Gordon Verheul
- Written by: Ben Sokolowski; Keto Shimizu
- Cinematography by: Shamus Whiting-Hewlett
- Editing by: Thomas Wallerstein
- Production code: 3J5813
- Original air date: February 10, 2016
- Running time: 42 minutes

Guest appearances
- Neal McDonough as Damien Darhk (special appearance by); Katrina Law as Nyssa al Ghul; Jimmy Akingbola as Baron Reiter; Tom Amandes as Noah Kuttler / The Calculator; Natasha Gayle as Mesi Natifah; Elysia Rotaru as Taiana Venediktov; Charlotte Ross as Donna Smoak

Episode chronology
← Previous "Unchained"	Next → "Code of Silence"
- Arrow season 4

"Sins of the Father" is the 13th episode of the fourth season of The CW series Arrow and 82nd overall. The episode was written by Ben Sokolowski and Keto Shimizu and directed by Gordon Verheul. It was first broadcast on February 10, 2016, in The CW.

The episode revolves about Nyssa offering an elixir named Lotus to Oliver that can reverse the effects of the Lazarus Pit and offers him to heal Thea, in exchange for him killing Malcolm. They convince him to meet with Nyssa to give her the command of the League of Assassins but Malcolm will not give it too easy. Meanwhile, Felicity meets with her father, the Calculator, and listens to why he left, questioning if he is a bad man.

The episode received generally positive reviews.

== Plot ==
On Lian Yu, Taiana is furious at Oliver for killing Vlad. When he shows her the rock with symbols, Taiana takes the stone and asks for Reiter to barter her escape, but Reiter takes the stone and keeps them imprisoned. He tells Taiana to kill Oliver, or she will die. They begin conspiring to escape by killing Reiter and his men. Reiter then tells Oliver that they will begin to dig underneath to find what he is looking for.

Five years later, Nyssa tells Oliver she will give him the elixir if he kills Malcolm. Meanwhile, Felicity confronts Noah, her father, over his past, and he gives her a USB proving some of his crimes. The team is considering whether to kill Malcolm. They finally decide to meet with Malcolm to give the League's ring to Nyssa. Laurel meets with Nyssa to negotiate another way: Oliver can convince Malcolm to give his power to her in exchange for the elixir. Nyssa agrees but threatens to kill people if Malcolm refuses.

Oliver asks for a sample of the elixir to prove the value. They put it on Thea and some of the scars heal themselves. Oliver, Diggle, Laurel and Malcolm meet with Nyssa to give her the ring. However, Malcolm snatches the ring and brings assassins to attack them. Nyssa and her fighters escape and Malcolm is stopped by Oliver. The team decides to intercept and neutralize Nyssa and her group. Meanwhile, Felicity takes her father to the labs of Palmer Tech but she is sending him into a "trap". Oliver confronts Malcolm for not following Nyssa's conditions, and Malcolm responds by denying Nyssa his power and also reveals that he knows Oliver has a son.

In order to bring peace, Oliver arranges a sword fight between Nyssa and Malcolm. However, before the fight, Oliver uses ancient rules to switch Nyssa's place for him, as he is still her husband. Oliver swiftly defeats Malcolm and, instead of killing him, cuts his hand with the League's ring, knocks him out and gives it to Nyssa. He is finally given the elixir and Nyssa becomes the new Ra's al Ghul. He gives the elixir to Thea and she is healed.

Noah meets with Felicity. She confronts him for having abandoned her, and he admits that the police are looking for her and Lance. Then the police arrive and arrest him. Seeing the new role and darkness on her, Nyssa brings Malcolm, Oliver and Laurel over, takes her ring and throws him on the fire, disbanding the League of Assassins. Malcolm is furious about Oliver's betrayal and threatens to make him suffer. At night, Malcolm meets with Darhk to tell him the person Oliver loves the most: William, his son.

== Production ==
In January 2016, it was revealed that the 13th episode for the fourth season would be titled "Sins of the Father" and was to be directed by Gordon Verheul and written by Ben Sokolowski & Keto Shimizu.

== Reception ==
=== Viewers ===
The episode was watched by 2.44 million viewers with a 0.9/3 share among adults aged 18 to 49. This was a 2% decrease in viewership from the previous episode, which was seen by 2.48 million viewers and a 0.9/3 in the 18-49 demographics. This means that 0.9 percent of all households with televisions watched the episode, while 3 percent of all households watching television at that time watched it.

=== Critical reviews ===
"Sins of the Father" received generally positive reviews from critics. Jesse Schedeen of IGN gave the episode an "okay" 6.7 out of 10 and wrote in his verdict, "This week's Arrow was disappointingly uneven despite the strong thematic story ties and the idea that multiple characters were grappling with change and redemption. Only one of the several action scenes stood out, and the rooftop duel was disappointingly brief and unsatisfying. Luckily, the resolution of this conflict and the major twist that resulted spell good things for the show in the weeks ahead."

The A.V. Club's Alasdair Wilkins gave the episode a "B" grade and wrote, "'Sins Of The Father' is a solid enough episode, though I'll admit it feels like it's missing something. I suspect some of that goes back to the problem that hung over so much of the third season, as Arrow struggled to make all the business with Ra's al Ghul compelling. Nearly a year later, my best explanation for the relative failure of that season is that the show never really got across why the League story mattered. "

Andy Behbakht of TV Overmind gave the episode a 4 star rating out of 5 and wrote "Overall, despite some mixed feelings about it, 'Sins of the Father' was a solid episode in many ways as the intensity worked better once the whole episode had played out and it did set up more things to look forward to. Malcolm became a bit more relevant again, even though he lost the title, the league as well as a hand (want to bet how many episodes it will take before he get some sort of cybernatic hand?), but at least now he has a bigger role to play again. The one thing that still remains irrelevant is those darn flashbacks."

Jonathon Dornbush of EW stated: "When life offers a choice, do you simply accept the options presented to you, or do you, as Oliver attempts to throughout 'Sins of the Father,' discover an alternative that might actually be the best choice to make? On Arrow this week, nearly every major decision either implicitly or explicitly involved fathers. From Malcolm Merlyn to Felicity's returning father to Nyssa's dead dad to Oliver himself, fatherhood looms large over the characters' choices in this episode (which, if the utterance of that word approximately 72 times within the first 15 minutes didn't tip you off, was most certainly the theme of the week)."

Carissa Pavlica from TV Fanatic, gave a 4.0 star rating out of 5.0, stating: "There were certainly some surprises on Arrow Season 4 Episode 13, but unless we're being fooled, it seems as though we have been given a pretty good indication of where the remainder of the season is heading. We might know who is in the grave and who is responsible for putting them there."

Noel Kirkpatrick of TV.com wrote positive about the episode, stating "I think many of you, dear readers, are in agreement with me that Oliver has generally sucked at this sort of thing (i.e., the back of half of last season), and while he didn't suck too much less here, we at least got to see him grapple with the decision-making and what happened when his plans went awry. As a result, it was not only a nice departure from the usual Arrow routine, but it also didn't get bogged down in that whole 'I plotted this off-screen' nonsense that plagued Season 3's storyline. Essentially, while Oliver was still in charge, at least Diggle and Laurel were piping in with opinions, and Oliver was listening to them and weighing his options with their advice. I like it when the show treats Team Arrow as a team, what can I say."
