= List of Black Canary characters =

This is a list of Black Canary characters.

== Supporting characters ==
Character	First appearance	Description
Anne Green	Green Arrow (vol. 2) #1 (February 1988)	A psychiatrist who counseled Oliver Queen and Dinah Lance.
Batman	Detective Comics #27 (May 1939)	A fellow resident of Gotham City and occasional crime fighting partner.
Barbara Gordon	Detective Comics #359 (January 1967)	Black Canary's Birds of Prey teammate and frequent friend and companion.
Birds of Prey	Black Canary/Oracle: Birds of Prey #1 (November 1995)	Black Canary and Oracle's (Barbara Gordon) team of operatives.
Colin	Green Arrow (vol. 2) #5 (June 1988)	A teenager that worked at Sherwood Florist, he is exposed as a member of the Warhogs street gang who under the orders of sub-boss Kebo attacked and, in some cases, murdered homosexual men.
Craig Windrow	Birds of Prey: Wolves #1 (October 1997)	Dinah Laural Lance's former husband.
Creote	Birds of Prey #56 (August 2003)	The devoted partner and hired muscle of techno-genius and vigilante Savant.
Danny Harris	Action Comics #456 (February 1976)	A comedian kidnapped by Lex Luthor for ransom before being saved by Green Arrow and Black Canary.
Green Arrow	More Fun Comics #73 (November 1941)	Archer superhero and Black Canary's on-again, off-again boyfriend and later husband.
Hal Jordan	Showcase #22 (October 1959)	Green Arrow, Black Canary and Hal Jordan (Green Lantern) once traveled across the country together.
Huntress	The Huntress #1 (April 1989)	Longtime Birds of Prey teammate and close friend.
Johnny Thunder	Flash Comics #1 (January 1940)	The seventh son of a seventh son, born at 7 a.m. on Saturday, July 7, the seventh day of the week, the seventh day of the seventh month in 1917, Johnny was gifted with a genie like being called a Thunderbolt who granted his wishes after saying the phrase "Cei-U". Black Canary originally opposed Johnny as a foil and later teamed up as an ally.
Justice League of America	The Brave and the Bold #28 (February/March 1960)	The foremost heroic group of the modern age of heroes.
Justice Society of America	All-Star Comics #3 (Winter 1940)	The first superhero team, Black Canary joined on the recommendation of Johnny Thunder who was losing his powers and needed someone to take his place on the team. Black Canary would remain a pivotal member of the team for the remainder of its tenure and in most incarnations following.
Lady Shiva	Richard Dragon, Kung Fu Fighter #5 (December 1975)	A martial arts grandmaster and one of the most skilled combatants in the entire DC Universe. She is an assassin-for-hire, who specializes in killing her targets with her bare hands. Shiva considers Black Canary to be one of her few martial-arts equals and have battle and teamed-up on multiple occasions. In a trade Shiva took the name Jade Canary and joined the Birds of Prey while Black Canary went to train with Shiva's master.
Larry Lance	Flash Comics #92 (February 1948)	A detective who was a love interest and later husband to the first Black Canary and father to the second.
Lucas Hilton	Green Arrow and Black Canary #16 (March 2009)	Star City police lieutenant and ally of Black Canary and Green Arrow.
Marianne	Green Arrow (vol. 2) #36 (September 1990)	Dinah Lance's assistant and driver for Sherwood Florist after being saved by and befriending Green Arrow, Marianne would steal a kiss from Queen one New Year's Eve, confessing her love for him and the catalyst for the separation between Queen and Lance when the heroine witnessed the event.
Roy Harper	More Fun Comics #73 (November 1941)	Green Arrow's adopted son and sidekick. Harper began his heroic career as Speedy and later Red Arrow.
Ruth Anderson	World's Finest Comics #248 (December 1977-January 1978)	Dinah Lance's friend in the fashion industry.
Savant	Birds of Prey #56 (August 2003)	A genius, spoiled heir to an enormous fortune, Savant had moved to Gotham to become a self-styled vigilante.
Sin	Birds of Prey #92 (May 2006)	A child being groomed to be the next Lady Shiva, she was freed and adopted by Black Canary.
Starman	Adventure Comics #61 (April 1941)	An astronomer and an expert scientist, having developed a device called the cosmic rod Ted Knight fought crime alongside the Justice Society and later dated the first Black Canary.
Wildcat	Sensation Comics #1 (January 1942)	The first Black Canary's Justice Society teammate and mentor to the second.
Wonder Woman	All-Star Comics #8 (December 1941)	A fellow member of both the Justice Society and Justice League and occasional crime fighting partner.

== Enemies and villains ==
Villain	First appearance	Description
Cheshire	The New Teen Titans Annual #2 (1983)	Considered the second most dangerous martial artist on the world, Cheshire has come into contact with Black Canary multiple times, sometimes portrayed as a foe and others as an unlikely ally. She's also the girlfriend of Roy Harper, with whom the Black Canary shares a strong maternal bond.
Count Vertigo	World's Finest Comics #251 (July 1978)	Suffering an inner ear defect, Count Werner Vertigo was outfitted with an electronic device to live a normal life but discovered that he could alter people's sense of balance after he was implanted. Vertigo is a frequent foe of Black Canary, joining the Injustice Society as her villainous counterpart and taking his vendetta out against her sometimes boyfriend Green Arrow.
Cupid	Green Arrow/Black Canary #15 (February 2009)	Villainess obsessed with Green Arrow and began a vendetta against Black Canary her rival for Green Arrow's affection.
Everyman/Dark Arrow	52 #21 (September 2006)	Part of Lex Luthor's Everyman Project, Hannibal Bates was given the ability to eat living matter and almost perfectly replicate whom it belongs to. He took the place of Oliver Queen on his wedding night to Black Canary but when he tried to kill her due to his impotency, she instead took his life. However, he survived believing himself still Queen and joined with Cupid as Dark Arrow.
Merlyn	Justice League of America #94 (1971)	The bitter archenemy of Green Arrow, Black Canary would encounter Merlyn in battle numerous times. On one occasion Merlyn attempted to frame his nemesis and came up with possibly the most devious plan he ever thought of: by using and manipulating those who were close to Black Canary. After noticing that the League of Assassins were tracking down a little girl known as Sin, who was currently under the care of Black Canary, Merlyn took the opportunity to kidnap the Sin and pin the kidnapping and the death of Sin on Green Arrow. However, there was fault with his plan when Sin mysteriously disappeared and Merlyn was forced into a grueling fight with the pursuing Black Canary. Nearly strangling Black Canary with the cord of his broken bow, Merlyn was defeated by Green Arrow, later realizing that it was Conner Hawke who took Sin from his care and faked her death to throw off the League of Assassins from capturing Sin.
Twelve Brothers in Silk	Birds of Prey #81 (June 2005)	A family of professional killers who have fought Black Canary and the Birds of Prey.
White Canary	Birds of Prey (vol. 2) #1 (July 2010)	The only sister of the Twelve Brothers in Silk, she was spared after lightning appeared on the day of her birth and killed her midwife, making her father believe that something powerful wanted her to live. She would be trained by her brothers in the same techniques, and after their defeat at the hands of Black Canary she hunted them down and killed them for dishonoring their father's name. Calling herself White Canary, she would pursue a vicious vendetta of vengeance against Black Canary.

=== Foes of lesser renown ===
In alphabetical order (with issue and date of first appearance)

Villain	First appearance	Description
Aquarius	Justice League of America #73 (August 1969)	A living star who had been on trial for their crimes by other living stars and sentenced to wandering the multiverse. He despised order and tried to upset the universe, but had lost most of his power in that way, only having about enough to survive by the star's judgement. Aquarius was responsible for the death of Larry Lance and in effect, Black Canary's move from Earth-One to Earth-Two.
Auntie Gravity	World's Finest Comics #261 (February 1980)	An elderly woman who developed anti-gravity powers. Forming a gang with her three nephews, she menaced Star City before being defeated by Black Canary.
Banko Jim	Flash Comics #90 (December 1947)	A bank robber who created an elaborate scheme to frame Black Canary for murder after Johnny Thunder snapped a picture of him committing a crime.
Big Game	Green Arrow and Black Canary #23 (October 2009)	The name of two villains, the first a retroactive early opponent of Green Arrow that hunted the hero and was murdered by Cupid years later. His son Blake took up the torch.
Blazing Infernos	Green Lantern #100 (January 1978)	A Star City street gang, the Infernos set off bombs throughout the city and were secretly funded by insurance investors hoping to justify raised rates. Green Arrow, Black Canary, and Roy Harper caught the Infernos, who turned informant on the investors.
Bonfire	Detective Comics #553 (August 1985)	A pyrokinetic villainess.
Borch	Green Lantern #110 (November 1978)	An extradimensional vagabond whose careless travel into the "Silver Twist" cosmic rift discharged energy that almost detonated a nuclear-powered satellite in Earth's orbit. Green Arrow and Green Lantern entered the twist to find Borch had discovered/created "Coyote Gulch", a reality based on the American Old West, and was leading the Clancy Bunch to take over the Gulch. Green Arrow defeated the Clancy Bunch, while Green Lantern defeated Borch.
Bullet Ben	Flash Comics #93 (March 1948)	A petty crook disguised as a swami and leader of the Order of the Crimson Crystal cult.
Colonel Krisp	Green Lantern #94 (April 1977)	A renegade military officer, Thaddeus Lucius Krisp abducted Black Canary in a failed attempt to extort Green Arrow into assassinating the President of the United States.
Discord	Green Arrow and Black Canary #17 (February 2009)	Sonic-powered criminal Sean Sonus temporarily rendered Star City's inhabitants deaf before being defeated.
Dodger	Green Arrow and Black Canary #7	A high-tech supercriminal working in England.
Doomsters	Justice League of America #78 (February 1970)	By the time the pollutant-ridden planet Monsan finally became uninhabitable, a handful of survivors had altered their body chemistries to enable them to thrive on pollutants, with the unanticipated effect of warping their minds so that they sought to render other planets equally polluted. These survivors, the Doomsters, led by Chokh, came to Earth intent on converting its atmosphere into a gas which they alone could breathe; they defeated Black Canary and other JLA members (plus Vigilante (Greg Sanders)), but Green Arrow rescued the heroes, ultimately allowing the JLA sufficient recovery time to defeat the Doomsters. Green Arrow and Black Canary's romance first developed in the wake of this crisis (at least, in Pre-Crisis continuity), making it of particular relevance in both characters' histories.
Dregz	Green Arrow and Black Canary #15 (February 2009)	Machete-wielding street thug and supervillain wannabe.
Duchess	Flash Comics #94 (April 1948)	A criminal mastermind who disguised herself as a flower girl to assassinate people and used a "photon smasher" flashlight to blast enemies.
el Espectro	Green Lantern #120 (September 1979)	In 1513, Spaniard Jaime Sanchez discovered Florida's Fountain of Youth, but was betrayed and buried alive by his fellow explorers; uprooted almost 500 years later, he fought Green Arrow and Black Canary before being defeated by Green Lantern.
Glorn Hive-Master	World's Finest Comics #253 (October–November 1978)	The leader of the extradimensional Glorn race, who abducted Black Canary to be their queen, pursued by Green Arrow, devolved into harmless state via radio waves.
Harpy	Green Lantern #82 (March 1971)	Harpy is the leader of a race of mythical bird women, usually presented as a supervillain. The character was created by Dennis O'Neil and Neal Adams. A new version of Harpy appeared in The New 52 continuity as a member of a rival band to Black Canary called Bo M. Valerie Estelle Frankel pointed out how "[f]lying alings with spirituality", one trait associated specifically with feminine characters, and listed Harpy - together with Black Canary herself - as one of a larger group of bird-themed characters in superhero comics.
Hellgrammite	The Brave and the Bold #80 (October 1968)	After mutating himself into an insect-like form, Roderick Rose clashed with several super-heroes, including Green Arrow and Black Canary in World's Finest Comics #248-249; he eventually became more commonly associated with Superman.
Huntress	Sensation Comics #68 (August 1947)	A big-game hunter and tiger-themed criminal, Huntress is both the archenemy of the second Black Canary's mentor Wildcat and one-time foe of the first Black Canary and her then-boyfriend Starman.
Huntress of the Highway	Flash Comics #92 (February 1948)	A criminal who sent a funeral wreath to Larry Lance as a threat and set up a truck route that would trap trucks and steal their cargo, before being foiled by Black Canary and Larry.
Jakob Whorrsman	Black Canary (vol. 2) #1 (January 1993)	Corporate mogul who uses his powerful connections and monetary resources for various evil deeds.
Joshua	Green Lantern #78 (July 1970)	Mind-controlling leader of cult preparing for race war, brainwashed Black Canary into almost killing Green Arrow; cult later taken over by Sister Joshua, who battled Black Canary, but not Green Arrow (Flash #218 (October 1972)).
Miss Masters	Flash Comics #95 (May 1948)	A woman who disguised herself as Black Canary to murder her uncle and inherit his fortune.
Mist	Adventure Comics #67 (October 1941)	A criminal mastermind who can transform into living mist. The Mist battled Black Canary during her time dating the Mist's archenemy Starman.
Mrs. Hollinger	World's Finest Comics #282 (August 1982)	Harbored vendetta against Green Arrow for accidentally killing her hoodlum son when the latter's gang attacked the hero (in The Flash #217 (August 1972)); hired Slingshot and gang to abduct Black Canary, then replace Green Arrow's stunt arrows with lethal arrows so he would again inadvertently kill and presumably retire; outsmarted by Green Arrow, declared vengeance against him to be her only reason left to live.
Onomatopoeia	Green Arrow (vol. 3) #12 (March 2002)	Making sport of slaying costumed heroes, the enigmatic Onomatopoeia tried to kill Black Canary and the Arrow family.
Order of the Crimson Crystal	Flash Comics #93 (March 1948)	A cult of women obsessed with obtaining a "mystical" crimson ruby given to Black Canary by a dying woman.
Pete Lomax	Detective Comics #549 (April 1985)	After getting his hands on a bow and arrow, Pete Lomax tracks down Green Arrow and Black Canary and puts the latter in the hospital.
Pistolera	Detective Comics #674 (May 1994)	A sharp-shooting assassin. Part of a group of assassins called the Ravens, charged with taking out Black Canary and the Birds of Prey.
Sniper One	Green Arrow and Black Canary #11 (October 2008)	Formerly employed by the mysterious Echo Initiative group, psychologically unstable assassin Palmer Cokes was hired by Shado to kill Green Arrow, but ultimately failed.
Socks Slade	Flash Comics #88 (August 1947)	A gangster who stole the famous Kooblin Sapphire and was foiled by Black Canary (herself trying to steal it) and Johnny Thunder (mostly through his bumbling incompetence).
Thurston Keane	Action Comics #450 (August 1975)	Member of the Organization, a subversive group equipped with nuclear weapons and intent on "neutralizing" the world's governments; posed as vacation resort manager; his attempt to pin murder charges on vacationing Green Arrow and Black Canary led to the investigation, and presumed destruction, of the Organization.
Dr. Titus Selinger	DC Comics Presents #54 (February 1983)	Scientist whose attempt to harness outer space rays created deadly smog across the U.S., as well as a giant smog-creature; Green Arrow and Black Canary worked with Superman to restore things to normal.
Witch Queen	Green Lantern #82 (February 1971)	Alleged sister of Sinestro, commanded Harpies and Amazon warriors in a war against all men; fought Green Arrow, Black Canary, and Green Lantern.
Wizard	All Star Comics #34 (March 1945)	Member of the Injustice Society, the Wizard fought the first Black Canary on a few occasions both on her own and with the Justice Society. He eventually cursed her daughter with a potent sonic cry.
Yellow Peril	Green Lantern #107 (August 1978)	Quintet of skyjackers who planned to take over Coast City's airport and, anticipating trouble from Green Lantern, dressed themselves in yellow costumes which rendered them immune to Green Lantern's power ring. However, they did not anticipate the presence of Green Arrow and Black Canary, who easily defeated them sans power rings.

=== Enemies created for other media ===
Black Canary villains "created" in other media, with no appearances in previous or subsequent comics. Those sharing the names of comic villains, but bearing no other similarities, are noted:

Villain	Media	Actor/Actress
Music Meister	Batman: The Brave and the Bold	Neil Patrick Harris
Steven Mandragora	Justice League Unlimited	Glenn Shadix

== See also ==
- List of Aquaman enemies
- List of Batman family enemies
- List of Flash enemies
- List of Green Lantern enemies
- List of Superman enemies
- List of Wonder Woman enemies
