= Green Arrow and Black Canary =

Comic book by Cliff Chiang

- Variant cover art for Green Arrow and Black Canary #1, art by Cliff Chiang.

Publication information
- Publisher: DC Comics
- Schedule: Monthly
- Format: Ongoing series
- Genre: Superhero
- Publication date: December 2007 – 2010
- No. of issues: 32
- Main character(s): Green Arrow; Black Canary; Connor Hawke; Speedy; Red Arrow

Creative team
- Created by: Judd Winick; Cliff Chiang
- Written by: J. T. Krul
- Penciller: Federico Dallocchio
- Inker: Ruy Jose
- Letterer: Sal Cipriano
- Colorist: Michael Atiyeh
- Editor: Adam Schlagman

Collected editions
- The Wedding Album: ISBN 978-1-4012-1841-6

Green Arrow and Black Canary is a comic book ongoing series published by DC Comics starring superheroes Green Arrow and Black Canary.

== Publication history ==
The first issue (December 2007) was written by Judd Winick with art by Cliff Chiang. The series spun out of Green Arrow/Black Canary: Wedding Special (November 2007) by Winick and artist Amanda Conner. With issue #7, Mike Norton replaced Chiang. With issue #15, Andrew Kreisberg replaced Winick.

According to the announcements of then-upcoming titles at DCComics.com, the title was reverted to Green Arrow beginning with issue #30. After the events of Justice League: Cry For Justice, wherein Green Arrow killed the villain Prometheus for destroying Star City (which killed Roy Harper's daughter), Black Canary took Green Arrow's not telling her as a sign he wants to be alone and left him, supposedly ending the marriage.

This series ended in 2011 when DC relaunched its entire universe. Green Arrow went to Star City in his own solo series while Black Canary currently stars in Birds of Prey. Following the events of DC Rebirth, the two became romantically involved once more.

== Characters ==
- Black Canary (Dinah Laurel Lance) - The daughter of the original Black Canary, trained against her mother's wishes to become one of the best fighters in the world, along with her trademarked "canary cry" sonic scream. The wife of Green Arrow.
- Green Arrow (Oliver Queen) - Playboy billionaire turned contemporary Robin Hood, trained to be one of the greatest archers in the world. The husband of Black Canary, and the father of Connor Hawke.
- Green Arrow (Connor Hawke) - Oliver Queen's biological son, he replaced his father after his death and they now share the name.
- Speedy (Mia Dearden) - The newest sidekick to use the name, after living on the streets, she was taken in by Oliver and eventually trained.
- Red Arrow (Roy Harper) - Green Arrow's original sidekick and first Speedy, grew up to be Arsenal and now has a new codename.

== Plot synopsis ==
=== Dead Again ===
After Black Canary murders "Green Arrow" on their wedding night, it is discovered that it was actually Everyman posing as him. Black Canary and Speedy, along with Connor Hawke, venture to Themyscira on a hunch that Green Arrow may be a captive of the Amazons.

=== Family Business ===
Green Arrow, Black Canary and Speedy travel to Europe to hunt down who is responsible for wounding Connor Hawke. Along the way they join up with Batman, Plastic Man and Dodger and encounter a new League of Assassins.

=== A League of their Own ===
The missing Connor Hawke is found and it is discovered that this League of Assassins is a fake, tricked by a disguised Shado to fight Green Arrow. Shado's son Robert, who is also Green Arrow's son, was diagnosed with cancer, to cure him she employed Dr. Sivana to abduct and experiment on Connor. In the end Connor is rescued, but possesses nothing of his former self, acting differently, abandoning archery and apparently gaining healing abilities. Speedy leaves to pursue a relationship with Dodger and Connor Hawke leaves to rediscover himself.

=== Tough Love ===
A new villainess named Cupid begins killing Green Arrow's enemies to gain his love and approval. She kills Brick and several other low level villains and attempts to kill Merlyn as well. Oliver and Dinah's marriage is put to the test as Green Arrow becomes increasingly more violent and ignores Black Canary's warnings.

A music teacher is deafened by Black Canary's canary cry and becomes the hypersonic villain known as Discord.

Starting with July's issue, #22, the title gets divided into a Green Arrow and Black Canary double feature.

=== Repackaging as Green Arrow ===
During the events of the "Blackest Night" the series for issue 30 was retitled Black Lantern Green Arrow for a Blackest Night tie-in before switching to simply Green Arrow as part of the "Rise and Fall" storyline which is the aftermath of Justice League: Cry for Justice. The series picked up loose ends of Green Arrow killing the villain Prometheus and the destruction of Star City as well as Black Canary leaving Green Arrow for not telling her of his actions, assuming he wants to be alone. A new Green Arrow series eventually made its debut from J. T. Krul and artist Diogenes Neves.

== Collected editions ==
Also relevant is the lead-up to this series "Road to the Altar", as seen in Green Arrow collected editions:

Title	Collects	Date	ISBN
Vol. 1: The Wedding Album	Wedding Special, #1-5	October 2008	ISBN 978-1-4012-1841-6
Vol. 2: Family Business	#6-10	January 2009	ISBN 978-1-4012-2016-7
Vol. 3: A League of Their Own	#11-14, Green Arrow Secret Files and Origins #1	May 2009	ISBN 978-1-4012-2250-5
Vol. 4: Enemies List	#15-20	December 16, 2009	
Vol. 5: Big Game	#21-26	June 9, 2010	ISBN 978-1-4012-2709-8
Vol. 6: Five Stages	#27-30	November 2010	ISBN 978-1-4012-2898-9
Justice League: Rise and Fall	#31-32, Justice League: Rise and Fall Special, The Rise of Arsenal #1-4	March 2011	ISBN 978-1-4012-3013-5

== Reception ==
IGN gave the first issue a 5.7 out of 10. Issue #15, the first issue of Kreisberg's run, received a 7.5.
