= Eddie Fyers =

DC comics fictional character

- Eddie Fyers as depicted in Green Arrow: Secret Files & Origins #1 (December 2002). Art by Phil Winslade.

Publication information
- Publisher: DC Comics
- First appearance: Green Arrow: Longbow Hunters #3 (October 1987)
- Created by: Mike Grell

In-story information
- Alter ego: Edward Fyers
- Team affiliations: CIA; Ninth Circle
- Abilities: Weapons master

Eddie Fyers is a fictional character, appearing in American comic books published by DC Comics.

Edward Fyers appears in the first and eighth seasons of Arrow, portrayed by Sebastian Dunn.

== Publication history ==
Created by Mike Grell, he first appeared in Green Arrow: The Longbow Hunters #3 in 1987.

== Fictional character biography ==
Edward "Eddie" Fyers is initially employed by the CIA to kill the rogue archer Shado. He appeared frequently in Mike Grell's run on the Green Arrow ongoing series, occasionally in the summer bi-weekly Green Arrow arcs with Shado. Over the course of his appearances, Fyers becomes a reluctant ally of Oliver Queen, aka Green Arrow. After Grell left the Green Arrow series at issue #80, Chuck Dixon and Jim Aparo further developed Fyers's character.

Fyers becomes a father figure to Connor Hawke, Oliver's son and the second to bear the name Green Arrow. Fyers cares for Connor after Oliver is killed in a plane explosion near Metropolis while fighting off eco-terrorists.

Eddie Fyers re-appears in Green Arrow comics following DC Rebirth. This version of the character is a mercenary and member of the Ninth Circle, an international criminal organization and bank.

== In other media ==
Edward Fyers appears in Arrow, portrayed by Sebastian Dunn. This version is the field commander of a mercenary unit based on Lian Yu. Throughout flashbacks depicted in the first season, Amanda Waller secretly hires Fyers to kill China White. In pursuit of this, he attempts to destroy China's economy and kidnaps Shado to frame her father Yao Fei. After killing him, Shado, Oliver Queen, and Slade Wilson foil Fyers' plan before Queen kills him.
