= Cupid (DC Comics) =

- Carrie Cutter as Cupid, as she appeared in Green Arrow and Black Canary #19 (April 2009). Art by Michael Norton (penciller), Joe Rubinstein (inker), and David Baron (colorist)

Publication information
- Publisher: DC Comics
- First appearance: Green Arrow and Black Canary #15 (February 2009)
- Created by: Andrew Kreisberg; Mike Norton

In-story information
- Alter ego: Carrie Cutter
- Species: Metahuman
- Place of origin: New Earth
- Team affiliations: COBALT
- Notable aliases: Carrie Hartnell
- Abilities: Enhanced physical abilities Expert archer

Cupid (Carrie Cutter) is a supervillain appearing in American comic books published by DC Comics. She is an enemy of Black Canary and Green Arrow, the latter of whom she has an unhealthy limerence for.

Cupid appeared as a recurring character in Arrow, portrayed by Amy Gumenick.

== Publication history ==
Created by writer Andrew Kreisberg and artist David Baron, the character made her first appearance in Green Arrow and Black Canary #15 (February 2009).

== Fictional character biography ==
Carrie Cutter is a special ops soldier working for COBALT who believed her husband Ross had abandoned her. She agrees to participate in a program that is intended to eliminate her fear, but gives her enhanced strength and memory loss as a side effect. Years later, Cutter learns that Ross is still alive and tracks him to Star City, intending to kill him with poison. Green Arrow shoots and kills Ross from afar, believing him to be abusing Cutter. These events cause Cutter to become obsessed with Green Arrow.

As Cupid, Cutter murders several minor enemies of Green Arrow in an attempt to gain his affection. This attracts the attention of crime boss Brick, who sends his underlings to investigate. Cupid attacks Brick with a wrecking ball, killing him.

After spending some time in prison, Cupid is broken out by Black Canary, who believes that she is in danger. Cupid encounters Everyman, who believes himself to be Green Arrow and forms an alliance with her. Cupid later betrays and kills Everyman, declaring their relationship as "a rebound thing".

Green Arrow and Black Canary meet with Victor Turlough, a chemical engineer working for COBALT who was responsible for Cutter's transformation into Cupid and aims to reverse it. Green Arrow administers an antidote to Cupid, restoring her mind. Cupid apologizes for her actions as she is taken away by COBALT agents.

== Powers and abilities ==
Cupid is an exceptional hand-to-hand combatant and possesses superhuman physical abilities.

== In other media ==
Cupid (Amy Gumenick) as she appears in the TV series Arrow

- Cupid appears in the "Green Arrow" segment of DC Nation Shorts, voiced by Kari Wahlgren. This version is more childish and wields a crossbow that fires love-inducing bolts.
- Carrie Cutter appears in Arrow, portrayed by Amy Gumenick. This version is a former member of the Star City Police Department's SWAT team who was forced to leave because of an attachment disorder. Oliver Queen / Arrow rescues Cutter during Slade Wilson's attack on Starling City, leading to her developing an obsession with him and seeing herself as his partner. Queen later apprehends Cutter and sends her to A.R.G.U.S. rather than prison due to her condition. Later in the series, Cutter joins Amanda Waller's Suicide Squad and becomes enamored with teammate Floyd Lawton until he is killed in battle.
- The Arrow incarnation of Carrie Cutter appears in The Flash: Season Zero.
