= The Binding (2016 film) =

- Directed by: Gus Krieger
- Written by: Gus Krieger
- Produced by: Michael Glassman; Matthew Herrier; Scott Hyman; Gus Krieger; Jeff Moriarty
- Starring: Amy Gumenick; Josh Heisler; Leon Russom
- Cinematography: Jeff Moriarty
- Edited by: Matthew Herrier
- Music by: James Raymond
- Release date: 2 August 2016
- Running time: 91 minutes
- Country: United States
- Language: English

The Binding is a 2016 American psychological thriller film directed by Gus Krieger, starring Amy Gumenick, Josh Heisler and Leon Russom.

== Cast ==
- Amy Gumenick as Lisa
- Josh Heisler as Bram
- Leon Russom as Uriel
- Max Adler as David
- Stuart Pankin as Plank
- James Rose Collins as Scala
- Kate Fuglei as Martha
- Virginia Welch as Leah
- Rob Cunliffe as Daniel
- Kevin Stidham as Gabe
- Timothy Portnoy as Joseph
- Katie Parker as Sam
- Amelia Gotham as Hannah
- Larry Cedar as Kore

== Release ==
The film was released on DVD and Blu-ray on 2 August 2016.

== Reception ==
Andrew Pollard of Starburst wrote that the film "is certainly worth a watch, is full of impressive performances, is built up and delivered well, and may just surprise you in more ways than one as it marks Gus Krieger out as a talent to keep an eye on."

Sam Decker of Fangoria gave the film a score of 3 skulls out of 4 and wrote that Krieger "ratchets the tension nicely over the course of its runtime, deftly playing with audience expectation via continual shuffling of the narrative deck and more than a few red herrings."

Chris Coffel of Bloody Disgusting wrote, "Aside from the weird acting and lack of chemistry from our two leads, the biggest issue with The Binding is that it’s boring. It’s never scary or interesting. It’s just boring."
