= Amy Gumenick =

Swedish-born American actress (born 1986)

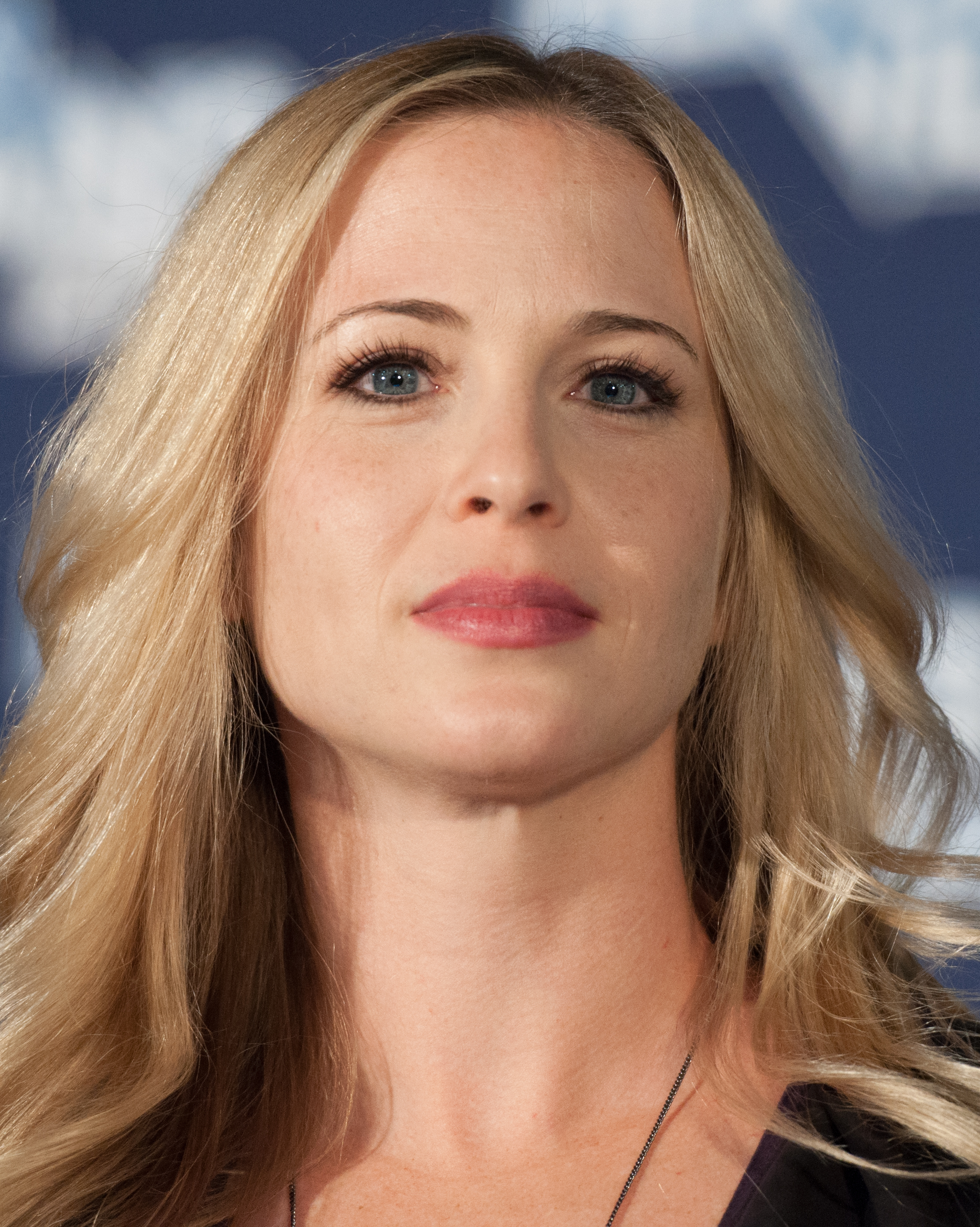
- Gumenick in 2016
- Born: Amy Jaclyn Gumenick; May 17, 1986 (age 40); Hudiksvall, Sweden
- Citizenship: Sweden; United States
- Occupation: Actress
- Years active: 2005–present

Amy Jaclyn Gumenick (/ˈɡʌmənɪk/ GUM-ə-nik; born 17 May 1986) is a Swedish-American actress. She appeared as Natalee Holloway in the television film of the same name (2009) and its sequel, the young Mary Winchester in Supernatural (2008–10), Carrie Cutter / Cupid in Arrow (2014–19) and Philomena Cheer in Turn: Washington's Spies (2014–2017).

== Early life ==
Gumenick was born in Hudiksvall, Sweden, the daughter of a Russian father and Polish mother. She graduated from the University of California, Santa Barbara in 2008, earning a BFA in theater with an emphasis in acting.

== Career ==
Gumenick's first role was in a short film entitled Sayonara Elviko, before she moved on to Army Wives. She then starred in a series of webisodes for the television show My Own Worst Enemy, before being cast as the young Mary Campbell, who became Mary Winchester, on Supernatural.

She then had roles on How I Met Your Mother, Grey's Anatomy, Ghost Whisperer and Bones before being cast as Natalee Holloway in the Lifetime movie Natalee Holloway. She also appeared in the movie's 2011 sequel, Justice for Natalee Holloway.

She subsequently appeared in episodes of Castle, No Ordinary Family, The Glades, The Closer, Grimm, CSI: Miami, CSI: NY and Rules of Engagement.

In 2014, she began playing the recurring character Philomena on the AMC series Turn: Washington's Spies. In August 2014, it was announced that she had been cast as Carrie Cutter / Cupid on The CW series Arrow.

== Filmography ==
=== Film ===
Year	Title	Role	Notes
2005	Sayonara Elviko		Short film
2009	Finding Nothing	Kelsi	Short film
2009	Quitting	Girl	Short film
2009	Just Add Water	Amy	Short film
2013	America 101	Sexy Co-worker	Short film
2014	Hard Crime	Map Girl	
2014	The One	Clair	Short film
2015	The Binding	Sarah	
2018	Bird Box	Samantha	

=== Television ===
Year	Title	Role	Notes
2008	Army Wives	Lee Ann	Episode: "Last Minute Changes"
2008	My Own Worst Enemy: Conspiracy Theory	Emily Kent	Webisodes
2008–09	Greek	Regan	2 episodes
2008, 2010	Supernatural	Young Mary Winchester	2 episodes
2009	How I Met Your Mother	Amanda	Episode: "Three Days of Snow"
2009	Grey's Anatomy	Becca Wells	Episode: "What a Difference a Day Makes"
2009	Ghost Whisperer	Gwen Collier	Episode: "See No Evil"
2009	Bones	Paige Sayles	Episode: "The Beautiful Day in the Neighborhood"
2009	Natalee Holloway	Natalee Holloway	Television film
2010	Castle	Danielle	Episode: "The Mistress Always Spanks Twice"
2010	No Ordinary Family	Olivia Schaeffer	Episode: "No Ordinary Quake
2011	The Glades	Gwendolyn Henley	Episode: "Gibtown"
2011	The Closer	Shannon Hirschbaum	Episode: "To Serve with Love"
2011	Grimm	Gilda Darner	Episode: "Bears Will Be Bears"
2011	Justice for Natalee Holloway	Natalee Holloway	Television film
2012	CSI: Miami	Heidi Taylor	Episode: "Friendly Fire"
2013	CSI: NY	Sandra Chandler	Episode: "Blood Actually"
2013	Rules of Engagement	Charlotte	Episode: "Cats & Dogs"
2014–2019	Arrow	Carrie Cutter / Cupid	Guest (7 episodes)
2014, 2016–17	Turn: Washington's Spies	Philomena Cheer	Recurring role, 11 episodes
2016	NCIS	Katrina Cooper	Episode: "Being Bad"
2018	Falling for Angels	Sharon	Recurring role: 2 episodes
2018	False Profits	Kimberly	Television film

=== Web ===
Year	Title	Role
2012	El Gato Blanco	Girl
