= Green Arrow: The Longbow Hunters =

1987 DC Comics limited series

- Cover of Green Arrow: The Longbow Hunters #1 (August 1987); Art By Mike Grell.

Publication information
- Publisher: DC Comics
- Schedule: Monthly
- Format: Limited series
- Genre: Superhero
- Publication date: August - October 1987
- No. of issues: 3
- Main character(s): Green Arrow; Shado; Black Canary

Creative team
- Written by: Mike Grell
- Artist: Mike Grell
- Letterer: Ken Bruzenak
- Colorist: Julia Lacquement

Collected editions
- Green Arrow: The Longbow Hunters: ISBN 0-930289-38-2

Green Arrow: The Longbow Hunters is an American comic book limited series by the creative team of writer/artist Mike Grell and colorist Julia Lacquement. It was published monthly by DC Comics from August to October 1987. The series is notable for shifting the tone of the character Green Arrow into a more gritty and grounded setting.

Green Arrow: The Longbow Hunters follows Oliver Queen, the superhero known as Green Arrow, dealing with a group of drug runners.

== Plot summary ==
On his forty-third birthday, Oliver Queen relocates from Star City to Seattle, Washington, the home of his girlfriend Dinah Lance. He changes his costume and abandons the use of his trademark trick arrows for more traditional archery equipment. As Green Arrow tries to track down a serial killer, the Seattle Slasher, who has been killing prostitutes in the area, Black Canary attempts to infiltrate a drug racket which may have ties to Kyle Magnor, a wealthy shipping magnate.

Oliver tracks the killer to the abandoned Seattle Underground section of the city, discovering that the killer is a disturbed ex-tunnel rat from the Vietnam War. The Slasher jumps Oliver and gets away to apparently kill again, but a mysterious female archer with an elaborate dragon tattoo on her arm shoots the slasher (as well as a passing motorist) before vanishing.

The archer is revealed to be Shado, the daughter of a Yakuza agent incarcerated during World War II, where American soldiers, including Magnor, forced him to reveal a major cache of Yakuza gold. Dishonored, the agent killed himself in atonement. When Shado comes of age, she is charged with killing those who dishonored her father and the Yakuza. The passing motorist she killed was one of those soldiers, who used the stolen gold to build a financial empire. Ollie tracks down Shado and fares poorly in the confrontation.

At home, Ollie hears on the news that the drug supplier Dinah had been investigating was found dead and mutilated earlier that day. Panicked, Oliver races to the dockside warehouse that Dinah suspected as the source of the drug distribution. There, he finds Dinah tied up, tortured, and on the verge of death. Without hesitation Ollie kills her torturer, one of Shado's intended victims, along with the others in the drug lab. After learning about what happened at the docks, Magnor warns his CIA contact, Osborne, that he wants better protection on their next deal. Osborne assigns weapons master Eddie Fyers to eliminate Shado.

After killing another target, Shado leaves a message for Ollie to meet her on Mount Rainier where she intends to kill Magnor. Although Ollie initially tries to stop her, he notices Fyers aiming a sniper rifle at Shado and moves to subdue him, inadvertently giving Magnor a chance to escape. Ollie also confronts Osborne about the use of an Iranian arms deal to fund Nicaraguan Contras, mirroring the events of the Iran-Contra story which broke months earlier. Ollie confronts Magnor in his office. Ollie intends to frame him for the murder of the drug supplier, but Shado shoots the target through the window and kills him.

== Consequences ==
In later storylines, Oliver reflects that taking a life in this manner marked a change in his life, leaving him unable to find peace anywhere or with anyone. When he is killed by a bomb explosion, he is initially resurrected without any memory of the events of this storyline or what happened afterwards.

== Reception ==
Green Arrow: The Longbow Hunters was nominated for a 1988 Eisner Award for Best Finite Series.

The series proved popular enough that DC Comics commissioned the first-ever Green Arrow ongoing series, also written by Grell (writer from issues #1-80, 1988-1993). The series ran for 11 years. Grell would write a retelling of Green Arrow's origin and first case in Secret Origins (vol. 2) #38 (March 1989). Grell also wrote and illustrated the official Post-Crisis origin of Green Arrow in the Green Arrow: The Wonder Year miniseries in 1993.

== Collected editions ==
Green Arrow: The Longbow Hunters is collected into a trade paperback format with a 5-page intro by editor Mike Gold.
