= Shaman's Tears =

American comic book series

- Cover of the first issue.

Publication information
- Publisher: Image Comics
- Schedule: Monthly
- Format: Limited series
- Publication date: May 1993 – August 1995
- No. of issues: 13 (#0–12)

Creative team
- Written by: Mike Grell
- Artist: Mike Grell

Shaman's Tears was an American comic book series created by Mike Grell and published by Image Comics.

== Premise ==
The comic starred Joshua Brand, the son of a half-Sioux father and an Irish mother, who returns as an adult to the reservation he ran away from as a child. With the help of an old shaman named Grey Hawk, Brand discovers he mystically possesses the powers of all animals and the Earth itself, he becomes the protector of the Earth sworn to stop those who would do it harm through malice or indifference.

== Development ==
Mike Grell says that when he decided to do a superhero series, he had to find a way to make it appealing to himself and decided to build the central concept using his fascination with Amerind lore. Grell took the concept to Image Comics due to Todd McFarlane whom had told Grell of his plans for Image prior to establishing the company, with Grell's positive experience working with upstart indie distributors like Pacific Comics and First Comics a motivating factor in choosing Image. Grell stated he wanted the book often dealt with issues the real world was facing such as pollution, corruption, crime, ecological genocide, and unethical scientific experimentation. Grell stated that he wanted to keep the premise grounded within the realm of what's plausible in the real world rather than embracing the more outlandish and fantastical aspects of traditional superhero works.

== Publication history ==
As a result of internal restructuring within Image Comics to address issues related to release delays and developing synergy among their first six series (Spawn, Youngblood, WildC.A.T.s, Shadowhawk, Cyberforce, and The Savage Dragon). Grell planned to shop Shaman's Tears and its planned spin-offs to other projects after ceasing the image run of the series at issue #4. According to Grell, the series would often experience release delays during its time at Image due to printers prioritizing the series of Image founders while non-founders were relegated to second tier status.

Jon Sable guest starred in issues #5-9 of the series (May 1993 - Aug 1995), his first appearance since the cancellation of the First Comics series Sable in 1990.

== Cancelled spin-off ==
Over the course of Shaman's Tears, Grell intended to introduce genetically engineered creatures created from different combinations of human and animal DNA created for experimental and military purposes and would serve as the first major antagonist for Brand before eventually struggling for their individual rights against their creators. Grell had intended to spin-off a book from Shaman's Tears following an X-Men-like group of these characters under the title The Breed, but after another publisher had already claimed the name for their own purposes Grell retitled the concept to Bar Sinister in reference to illegitimate birth in Heraldic law.

== Media adaptations ==
In 2022, American audio production company Pocket Universe Productions announced plans to produce a full-cast fiction podcast adapting the original series. The series will be produced and directed by PUP founder Lance Roger Axt, adapted by Grell and Choctaw writer Desmond Hassing, in conjunction with Native Voices at the Autry Museum of the American West under the Artistic Direction of actress DeLanna Studi.
