= Mike Grell =

American comic book writer and artist (born 1947)

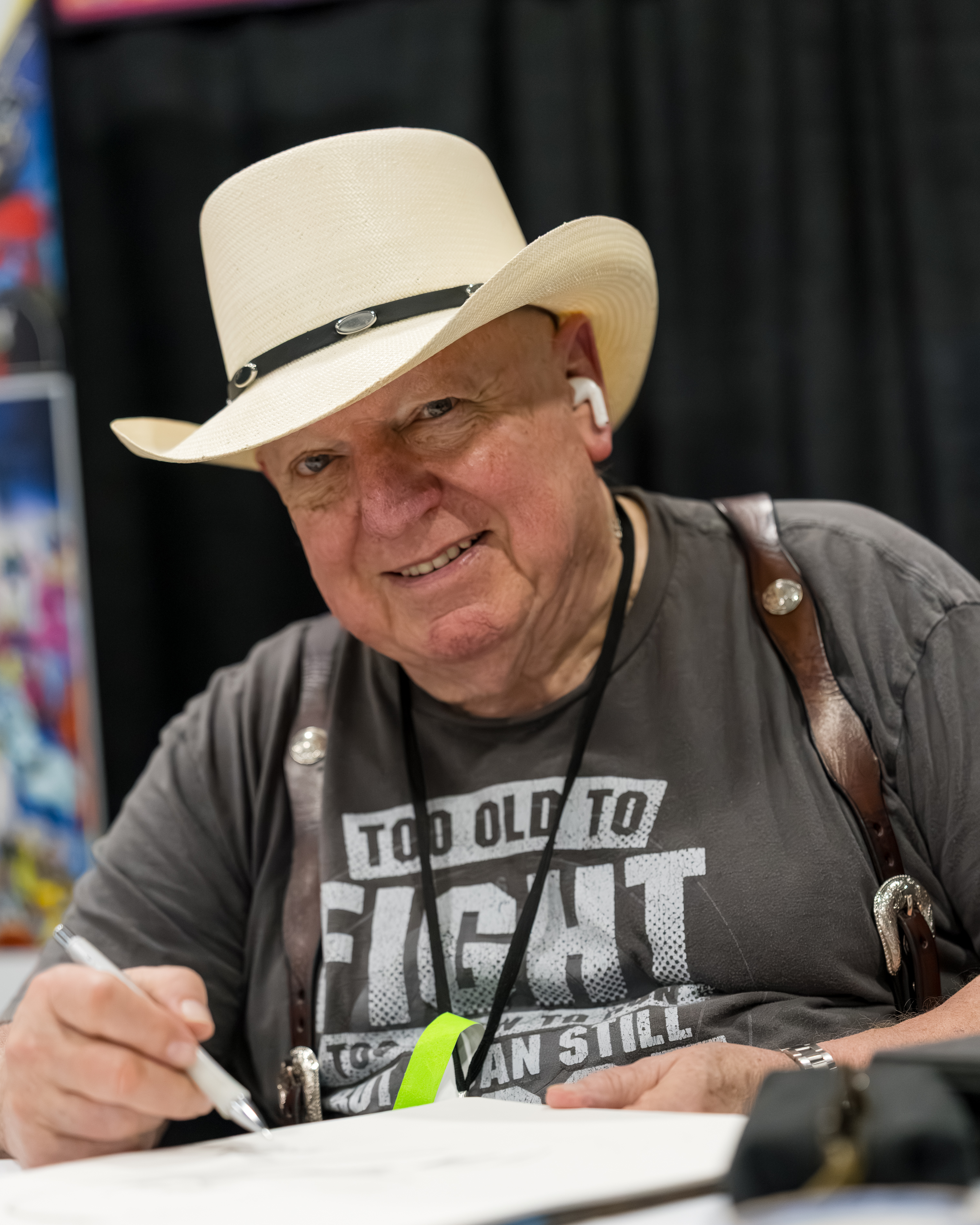
- Grell at GalaxyCon Nashville in 2026
- Born: September 13, 1947 (age 79)
- Areas: Writer, Penciller, Inker, Editor
- Notable works: Green Arrow: The Longbow Hunters; Green Lantern/Green Arrow; Jon Sable Freelance; Superboy and the Legion of Super-Heroes; The Warlord
- Awards: Inkpot Award 1982

Mike Grell (born September 13, 1947) is an American comic book writer and artist, known for his work on books such as Green Lantern/Green Arrow, The Warlord, and Jon Sable Freelance.

== Early life ==
Grell was born in Florence, Wisconsin. He studied commercial art at the University of Wisconsin–Green Bay. To avoid getting drafted into Army service during the Vietnam War when his draft lottery number came up, he enlisted for four years in the U.S. Air Force, including a stint as illustrator in Saigon. During his Air Force stint his work included drawing a weekly feature on survival tips for downed flyers, and he studied cartooning through the Famous Artists School correspondence course. After returning to civilian life, Grell enrolled in the Chicago Academy of Fine Art, and also worked as a freelance graphics artist.

== Career ==
Grell entered the comics industry as an assistant to Dale Messick on the Brenda Starr comic strip in 1972.

=== DC Comics ===
In 1973 Grell moved to New York City, and began his long relationship with DC Comics. At DC, Grell worked on characters such as Aquaman, Batman, Green Arrow, and the Phantom Stranger in arcs or single-issue stories. He and Elliot S. Maggin launched the Batman Family title in 1975 and Grell would work with Dennis O'Neil on the revival of the Green Lantern/Green Arrow series the following year. For a time between 1976 and 1978, Grell was writing and penciling one series, Warlord, and providing pencil art on two others, Green Lantern and Superboy and the Legion of Super-Heroes.

=== Superboy and the Legion of Super-Heroes ===
His regular first assignment at DC was on the bi-monthly Superboy and the Legion of Super-Heroes, a high-profile assignment for an artist with no prior experience illustrating a comic book. Grell says he got that job because he was walking in the editor's door to ask for work, literally, as the previous artist, Dave Cockrum, was walking out the door, having just quit. Grell inked a Cockrum penciled story ("Lost: A Million Miles from Home!") in issue #202 and became the penciler of the book with issue No. 203 (August 1974) which featured the death of Invisible Kid. These stories were written by Cary Bates with later issues by Jim Shooter. Grell drew All-New Collectors' Edition #C-55 (1978), a treasury-sized special written by Paul Levitz in which longtime Legion members Saturn Girl and Lightning Lad were married.

=== The Warlord ===
The cover of The Warlord #67 (March 1983). Art by Mike Grell.

A writer as well as artist, Grell cemented his status as a fan-favorite with his best-known creation, The Warlord. The character first appeared in 1st Issue Special No. 8 (Nov. 1975) and was soon given his own ongoing title (The Warlord #1, Jan/Feb 1976). In this series, Air Force pilot Travis Morgan crash-lands in the prehistoric "hidden world" of Skartaris (a setting highly influenced by Jules Verne's A Journey to the Center of the Earth and Edgar Rice Burroughs' Pellucidar). For years thereafter, Morgan engages in adventures dressed only in a winged helmet, wristbands, boots, and breechclout, and armed with a sword and a .44 Auto Mag. Grell wrote himself and editor Jack C. Harris into the metafictional conclusion of the story in The Warlord #35 (July 1980). After issue #52 other artists took over pencil duties while his then-wife Sharon Grell took over writing the scripts, as revealed in the letter column of a later issue, .

=== Tarzan ===
Grell wrote and drew the Tarzan comic strip from July 19, 1981, to February 27, 1983 (except for one strip, February 13, 1983, by Thomas Yeates). These strips were rerun in newspapers in 2004 – 2005.

=== First Comics: Jon Sable Freelance and Starslayer ===
Cover to Jon Sable Freelance #7 (December 1983). Art by Mike Grell.

In the 1980s Grell developed two creator-owned titles, Jon Sable Freelance and Starslayer. Jon Sable Freelance was published by the now-defunct First Comics, its first issue cover-dated June 1983. Starslayer, a space-born science fiction series, started at Pacific Comics, but shifted to First after Pacific went out of business.

The titular character of Jon Sable Freelance was a former Olympic athlete, later an African big-game hunter, who became a mercenary.

Sable was adapted into a short-lived television series and the character's origin tale, "A Storm Over Eden", from the comic book, was expanded and novelized by Grell under the title Sable, which was published in 2000 by Tor Books.

=== Back at DC: Green Arrow ===
In 1987, Mike Grell returned to a character he had first drawn in a back-up series in Action Comics during the 1970s, writing and drawing the three-issue prestige format limited series Green Arrow: The Longbow Hunters. He redesigned the character's costume and recast Green Arrow as an "urban hunter" going up against non-super-powered, real world villains such as serial killers, terrorists, street gangs, American mobsters and Japanese Yakuza. He did away with Green Arrow's arsenal of "trick arrows" and instead rearmed him with penetrating broadheads with which he actually killed his opponents. The Longbow Hunters showed the first instance in which Green Arrow ever deliberately killed someone.

The popularity of Longbow Hunters led to an assignment writing – and occasionally drawing – an ongoing Green Arrow series for 80 issues from 1988 to 1993. During this run, Grell avoided references to the fantastical elements of the DC Universe (e.g., in a guest appearance by Green Lantern the character is out of costume and does not use his powers). Notably, believing "Green Arrow" was "a stupid name", in no Mike Grell Green Arrow story (with the exception of Longbow Hunters #1) is the character ever referred to as Green Arrow anywhere other than on the cover.

Grell would write a retelling of Green Arrow's origin and first case in Secret Origins vol. 2 #38 (March 1989). He was the co-writer/cover artist for Green Arrow Annual (1991), drew the cover art for Annual #5 (1992), and wrote Annual #6 (1993). Grell wrote and illustrated the official Post-Crisis origin of Green Arrow in Green Arrow: The Wonder Year miniseries in 1993.

In 1988, Grell had a run writing Blackhawk in the short-lived anthology series Action Comics Weekly, writing the Blackhawk serial from issues #601–608.

=== James Bond ===
In 1988, Grell wrote and illustrated the graphic novel adaptation of the Timothy Dalton James Bond film Licence to Kill, and in 1989 wrote and drew an original Bond story, the three-issue mini-series Permission to Die, both co-published by Acme Press and Eclipse Comics.

=== Shaman's Tears and Bar Sinister ===
Shaman's Tears was a more ecologically themed outing for Grell. Main character Joshua Brand, the son of a half-Sioux father and an Irish mother, as an adult returns to the reservation he ran away from as a child. Discovering he mystically possesses the powers of all animals and the Earth itself, he becomes the protector of the planet. Jon Sable guest starred in issues #5–9 of this 12 issue series (May 1993 – Aug 1995). There was a number 0 issue published in November 1995.

Grell wrote and drew the covers, but did none of the interior artwork, for issues #1–4 of the Shaman's Tears spinoff series Bar Sinister (June – September 1995) from Windjammer, the creator-owned imprint of Valiant Comics. This series followed the adventures of a group of escaped government experimental subjects, animals genetically engineered to human intelligence and, basically, human form, as potential bio-weapons.

During this time period, Grell began work writing and penciling the unfinished and unpublished Shaman's Tears/Turok Dinosaur Hunter cross-over limited series for Valiant Comics. He co-wrote the two issue Turok limited series entitled Turok The Hunted, as well as several fill-in issues of the ongoing Turok series.

=== 2000s ===
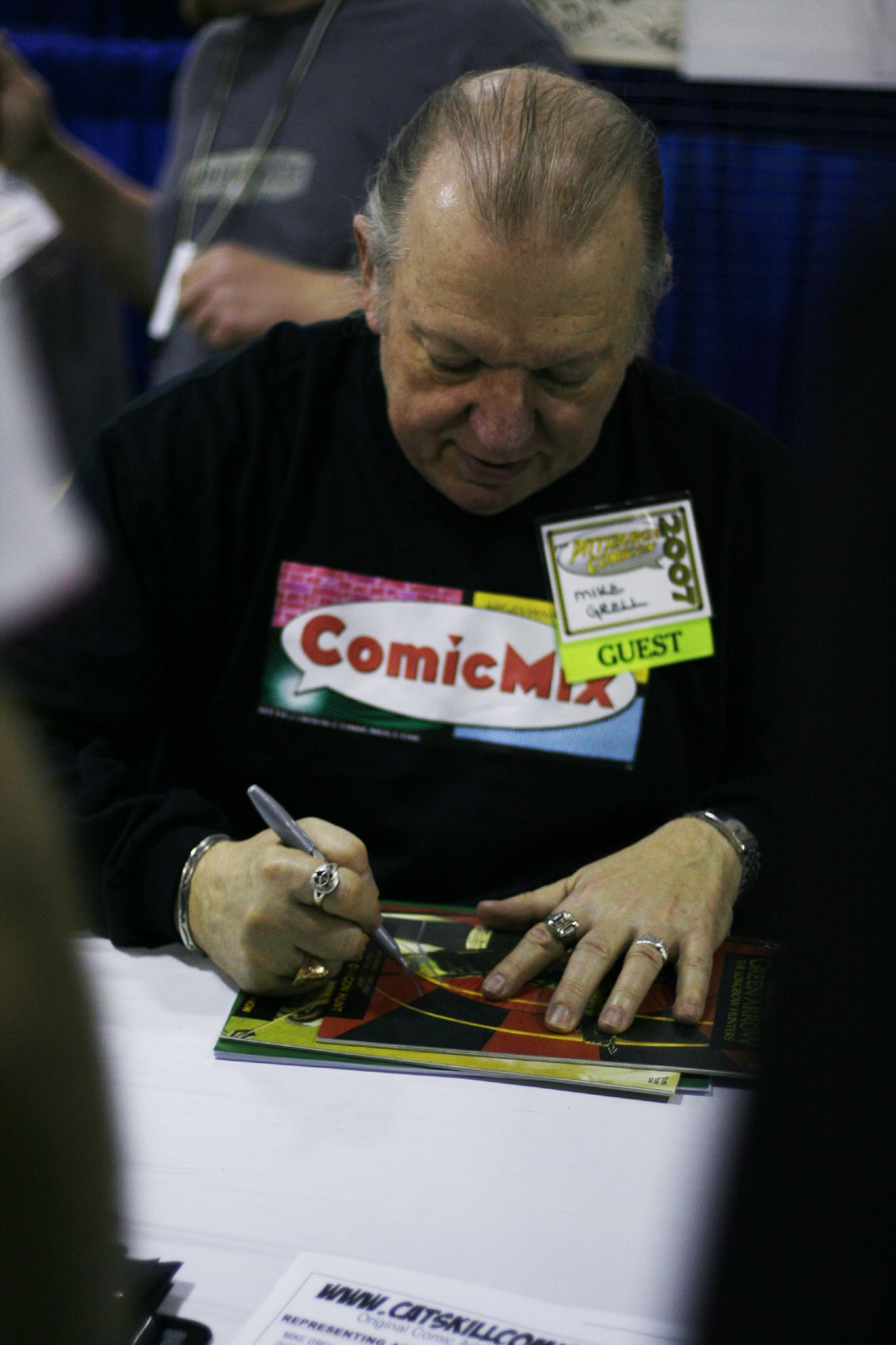
Grell at the 2007 Pittsburgh Comicon

From 2002 to 2003, Grell worked on Iron Man. It was during a Grell-written story from this period that Tony Stark revealed his secret identity to the world, a development met with mixed fan reaction.

After his work on Iron Man, Grell came back to comics in 2008, providing a variant incentive cover for Action Comics #861, part four of the Superman and the Legion of Super-Heroes story. DC sought variant covers for this story from artists who had worked on the Legion in the past, such as Steve Lightle, Keith Giffen, and Grell.

Other work includes a new ongoing series of The Warlord launched to coincide with the 35th anniversary. Grell brought the lead character's story to an end and drew some issues. Grell worked for Marvel drawing some stories of X-Men Forever. His last collaboration with DC to date has been the Green Lantern story for the DC Retroactive series, in 2011, where he provided the art.

As of 2008, Grell was rewriting the Jon Sable screenplay, working on an adaptation of Shaman's Tears, and writing two stories for ComicMix.com, a new Jon Sable story and The Pilgrim with Mark Ryan. In December 2010 he was announced as editor-in-chief of Ardden Entertainment.

In 2012, Grell provided the cover art for the 10-page preview comic produced by DC Comics for the 2012 San Diego Comic-Con to promote the TV series Arrow. Grell did interior art for issues #6 and #11 of the digital comic based on the TV series.

== Personal life ==
In the early 1980s, Grell was married to Sharon Wright. She ghost-wrote two years of The Warlord while Grell concentrated his efforts on Starslayer; Jon Sable, Freelance; and the weekly Tarzan Sunday comic strip.

== Awards ==
Mike Grell received an Inkpot Award in 1982.

== Bibliography ==
=== DC Comics ===
- Action Comics (Atom) #442; (Green Arrow) #440, 441, 444–446, 450–452, 456–458 (1974–76), #601–608 (writer, Blackhawk serial) (1988)
- Adventure Comics (Aquaman) #435–437; (Crimson Avenger) #440 (1974–75)
- Arrow (digital comic based on the TV series) #6, 11, 16 (2012–13)
- All–New Collector's Edition (Legion of Super-Heroes) #C–55 (1978)
- The Amazing World of DC Comics #12 (previously unpublished story) (1976)
- Batman #287–290 (1977)
- The Batman Chronicles #7 (1997)
- Batman Family (Robin and Batgirl) #1 (1975)
- Batman: Masque (1997)
- The Brave and the Bold vol. 2 #1–6 (1991–1992)
- DC Special Blue Ribbon Digest #10 (1981)
- DC Super Stars (Green Arrow) #17 (1977)
- DC Retroactive: Green Lantern – The '70s #1 (one-shot, 2011)
- Detective Comics (Robin) #445; (Batman) #455; (Atom) #463; (Black Canary) #464 (1975–76)
- Fanboy #6 (1999)
- 1st Issue Special (Warlord) #8 (1975)
- The Flash (Green Lantern backup stories) #237–238, 240–243 (1975–76)
- Green Arrow: The Longbow Hunters miniseries #1–3 (1987)
- Green Arrow, vol. 2, #1–80, Annual #4, 6 (1988–94)
- Green Arrow 80th Anniversary 100-Page Super Spectacular (2021)
- Green Arrow: The Wonder Year, miniseries, #1–4 (1993)
- Green Lantern, vol. 2, (Green Lantern/Green Arrow) #90–100, 106, 108–110 (1976–78)
- Green Lantern 80th Anniversary 100-Page Super Spectacular (2020)
- Legion of Super-Heroes, vol. 3, #45 (four pages only) (1988)
- Legion of Super-Heroes vol. 8 #9 (2020)
- Ms. Tree Quarterly (Batman text story) #1 (1990)
- Phantom Stranger, vol. 2, #33 (1974)
- Secret Origins, vol. 2, #38 (writer for Green Arrow story only) (1989)
- Shado: Song of the Dragon, miniseries, #1–4 (1992)
- Superboy starring the Legion of Super-Heroes #204–224, 235 (full art); #203 (inks over Dave Cockrum) (1974–78)
- T.H.U.N.D.E.R. Agents #7–11 (2011)
- Warlord #1–52, 59, Annual #1 (1976–82) (note: #51 is a reprint of #1)
- Warlord, vol. 3, #7–12, 15–16 (2009–10)
- Weird War Tales #67 (1978)
- Young Justice #13 (2020)

=== Image Comics ===
- Maggie the Cat #1–2 (1996)
- Shaman's Tears #1–12, No. 0 (1993–95)
- Spawn: The Impaler miniseries #1–3 (1996)

=== Marvel Comics ===
- Herc #6.1 (2011)
- Heroes for Hope (1985)
- Iron Man vol. 3 #50–69 (2002–03)
- X-Men Forever Giant-Size No. 1 (2010)
- X-Men Forever vol. 2, #9–10 (2010)

=== Other publishers ===
- Jon Sable Freelance #1–43 (First) (1983–86)
- Starslayer #1–6 (Pacific) (1982–83)
- ShadowStar #2 (cover art only) (Savage Graphics) (1985)
- Licence to Kill (Acme Press, Eclipse Comics) (1989)

=== Collected editions ===
- Legion of Super-Heroes Archives
  - Volume 10 includes Superboy # 202; 232 pages, October 2000, ISBN 978-1563896286
  - Volume 11 collects Superboy #203–212; 224 pages, August 2001, ISBN 978-1563897306
  - Volume 12 collects Superboy #212–223; 240 pages, May 2003, ISBN 978-1563899614
  - Volume 13 includes Superboy #224; 240 pages, May 2012, ISBN 978-1401234393

| Preceded by Dave Cockrum | Superboy and the Legion of Super-Heroes artist 1974–1976 | Succeeded by Jim Sherman |
| Preceded by Neal Adams (in 1972) | Green Lantern artist 1976–1978 | Succeeded by Alex Saviuk |
| Preceded by n/a | The Warlord writer 1976–1983 (with Sharon Wright Grell in 1982–1983) | Succeeded by Cary Burkett |
| Preceded by n/a | The Warlord artist 1976–1982 | Succeeded by Jan Duursema |
| Preceded by n/a | Green Arrow vol. 2 writer 1988–1994 | Succeeded by Kevin Dooley |
| Preceded by Frank Tieri | Iron Man writer 2002–2003 (with Robin Laws in 2003) | Succeeded by Robin Laws |
