= Shado (comics) =

Fictional character

- Shado as depicted in Green Arrow (vol. 2) #64 (July 1992). Art by Mike Grell.

Publication information
- Publisher: DC Comics
- First appearance: Green Arrow: The Longbow Hunters #1 (August 1987)
- Created by: Mike Grell (writer & artist); Lurine Haines (artist)

In-story information
- Team affiliations: Yakuza
- Abilities: Expert kyūdōka and marksman.

Shado is a fictional archer published by DC Comics. She first appeared in Green Arrow: The Longbow Hunters #1 (August 1987), and was created by Mike Grell. Shado is notable for being an antagonist and a love interest to Green Arrow in DC comic books, and is distinguished from other recurring characters by being both his rapist and the mother of his child. The character was later revised following DC's 2011 reboot, envisioning her as a former lover of Green Arrow's father, and the mother of his half-sister, Emiko.

A reimagined version of Shado appeared as a recurring character on The CW Arrowverse show Arrow, played by Celina Jade. In this version, she is neither Oliver's rapist nor the mother of his sister, but his lover and second teacher as an archer whose death haunts him in his later career as Green Arrow. The actress also portrayed her twin sister Mei in the third season.

== Publication history ==
After a significant appearance in Green Arrow: The Longbow Hunters in 1987, Shado was later given a mini-series in the year of 1992. Shado: Song of the Dragon is a four-issue miniseries that takes place in Japan, with Shado waging a war against the yakuza, who is seeking an ancient powerful sword that was stolen by a World War II veteran. The miniseries shares some continuity with "The Longbow Hunters" with Green Arrow appearing in several flashbacks, and Shado's concern for their son's safety from the yakuza.

== Fictional character biography ==
=== The Longbow Hunters ===
Shado first appears in Green Arrow: The Longbow Hunters in 1987. Her backstory tells that she is the daughter of a yakuza agent sent to America with a large cache of gold, prior to World War II, in order to establish yakuza operations in America. Being Japanese, Shado's father was placed in an internment camp when the war broke out. A group of American soldiers came to suspect his yakuza ties but were unable to torture him into revealing the location of any money. Years after the war, the retired soldiers decided to try again. This was after Shado had been born, so the retired soldiers were able to threaten her and her mother. Not wishing to see his family harmed, Shado's father turned over the gold. Shado's mother died from wounds the soldiers had given her, and her father committed seppuku to atone for failing the yakuza. His disgrace then fell upon his infant daughter, Shado, who was raised specifically to kill the Americans who had dishonored her yakuza family. To that end she was extensively trained in martial arts and kyūdō, the Japanese art of archery.

When Shado came of age, she left to America and began killing the Americans who had disgraced her. Two of the former soldiers had used the stolen gold to build a shipping business, as well as a drug trafficking operation. The string of murders she committed brought her to the attention of the Green Arrow, Oliver "Ollie" Queen. At first, the two were adversaries. However, Shado aided Ollie in killing the Seattle Slasher (a serial killer he had been tracking) and then assisted Oliver in rescuing his lover and partner Black Canary, who had been kidnapped and was being tortured by one of the Americans Shado was hunting. Seeing Black Canary being tortured, Green Arrow killed the man before Shado could. Shado would again work alongside Green Arrow when the drug-traffickers she was hunting made an alliance with CIA Agent Osborne. Shado would eventually kill all the former soldiers except the one Oliver had killed to save Black Canary.

=== Later stories ===
One year after the events in The Longbow Hunters, Shado found herself back in Japan, facing the wrath of her yakuza Oyabun (a yakuza godfather). By failing to execute one of her targets, the man Green Arrow had killed, she had failed her mission. Her Oyabun decides that, in accordance with yakuza tradition, she sever her thumb in atonement. Her Ku-Do Sensei, however, refused to allow his greatest student to destroy her skills, and drew a bow and arrow on the Oyabun. Once Shado escaped, the sensei allowed himself to be killed by the Oyabun. Shado, hearing the murder, returned and killed the Oyabun in turn, then fled to Hawaii. Green Arrow was then blackmailed by CIA Agent Osborne, who claimed that Shado had a treasure map, into tracking her down. No sooner did he find her, however, than she shot him in the chest with an arrow. Later she would claim to have mistaken him for an attacker. Shado helped nurse Oliver back to health from his injury. It was later revealed that during this time, while he was still delirious from pain and medications, Shado raped Oliver and conceived a son. Shado claimed not to be aware of Oliver's delirium until he called out Dinah's name.

Once Green Arrow recovered from his injuries he aided Shado in defending herself from the yakuza hunting her. The two are unable to prevent the death of her friend, Mr. Alvaro. After a bloody battle against a yakuza death-squad, Green Arrow and Shado discover that the yakuza had been following them using a tracking device in Oliver's quiver. Realizing that he had been used, Oliver arranged to meet Agent Osborne, telling him and two Japanese "agents" accompanying him that Shado had died. It was then revealed that Mr. Alvaro was the true "map"; he was the last survivor of a team of Filipinos that had buried their country's treasury to keep it from the Japanese, only telling Shado the location. It was then revealed that Osborne was working without the CIA's knowledge, with agents of a deposed Filipino dictator, who had recruited yakuza muscle by promising a share of the gold, along with Shado's death. With Shado's help, Green Arrow is able to bring Osborne to justice and lead the FBI to his yakuza allies. Shado and Green Arrow again parted ways. Several years later, Shado returned to Oliver with her child, Robert. She explained to Oliver that the child was his, and how the child had been conceived, but forbade him from taking a role in his son's life.

=== The Dragon's Blood ===
Shado next appears in the series Connor Hawke: The Dragon's Blood, in which a Chinese business man fascinated by ancient mythology holds an archery tournament and invites many skilled marksmen, including Green Arrow's son Connor Hawke and Shado. Later, in Green Arrow/Black Canary, Shado manipulates a false League of Assassins group into shooting Connor with a specially designed bullet, which reduces him to a vegetative state for Doctor Sivana so he can save her son, who is temporarily turned into a mindless drone by the doctor.

=== The New 52 ===
In 2011, DC relaunched and revamped its properties as part of its The New 52 publishing event. Green Arrow was one of several titles to receive a substantial overhaul, jettisoning much of its old continuity and depicting the adventures of a younger and less experienced Oliver Queen. Shado first appears in Green Arrow (vol. 5) #21 (2013), where she is discovered in Vlatlava by Oliver Queen, in the custody of Count Vertigo. She instantly recognizes Oliver by sight as Robert Queen's son. Oliver encounters her on a mission to find Robert Queen's killer, Komodo. She reveals to Oliver that she and his father were lovers and that together they had a daughter, Emiko, the young archer who travels at Komodo's side. In the conclusion of the "Broken" arc, Emiko later rejects Shado and Robert as parents, and chooses to be a pupil of Oliver's instead; she lives with Oliver and trains as his apprentice from thereon. However, in Green Arrow (vol. 6) #1 (2016), following DC Rebirth, Emiko betrays Oliver by riddling him with arrows alongside her mother in an apparent assassination attempt. She later appears to show some guilt and apprehension about her mother's plans.

In Secret Origins #3, a woman matching Shado's description is seen training Kate Kane, though it is not revealed if it is truly her.

=== Rebirth ===
Shado re-appears in Green Arrow comics following DC Rebirth. Shado is a mercenary and member of the "Ninth Circle", an international criminal organization, alongside such assassins like Brick, Eddie Fyers and Cheshire.

== Powers and abilities ==
Shado is an expert martial artist and a master of kyūdo, the Japanese art of archery. She uses a 30 kilogram bow and Japanese bamboo arrows 97.5 centimetres long.

== In other media ==
Shado appears in Arrow, portrayed by Celina Jade. This version is the Chinese daughter of Yao Fei who was held captive on the island of Lian Yu by Edward Fyers and forced to take the blame for his crimes. After helping Oliver and Slade Wilson defeat Fyers, Shado and Oliver develop a romantic relationship. In the second season episode "Three Ghosts", Shado is killed by Anthony Ivo. In subsequent seasons, a villainous, hallucinatory version of Shado appears, urging Slade to avenge her death. The third season introduces Shado's twin sister Mei (also portrayed by Jade) who has been looking for her since she vanished. After surviving an ambush from A.R.G.U.S., Oliver reveals to Mei that her family is dead, and she thanks him for giving her closure.
