= Everyman (DC Comics) =

- Everyman as Lex Luthor, as depicted in 52 #39 (March 2007). Art by Ivan Reis.

Publication information
- Publisher: DC Comics
- First appearance: 52 #21 (September 2006)
- Created by: Grant Morrison (writer); Geoff Johns (writer); Greg Rucka (writer); Mark Waid (writer); Keith Giffen (artist); Joe Bennett (artist)

In-story information
- Full name: Hannibal Bates
- Species: Metahuman
- Team affiliations: Infinity, Inc.; Black Lantern Corps
- Partnerships: Cupid
- Notable aliases: Blue Beetle, Green Arrow, Lex Luthor, Dark Arrow, Skyman, Sarge Steel
- Abilities: Shapeshifting

Everyman (Hannibal Bates) is a supervillain published by DC Comics. He debuted in 52 #17 (August 2006), and was created by Grant Morrison, Geoff Johns, Greg Rucka, Mark Waid, Keith Giffen and Joe Bennett. His name is a combination of fictional serial killers Hannibal Lecter and Norman Bates.

Everyman made his live-action debut on The Flash season one, portrayed by Martin Novotny.

== Fictional character biography ==
Everyman is a shapeshifter who can physically transform into another person after eating part of their body. He is generally unpopular with his teammates, mostly due to his searching for components of his teammates' living matter (e.g. hair and toenail clippings) to eat. It is later revealed that he had killed his teammate Skyman and had been masquerading as him for some time.

In "One Year Later", Everyman poses as a resurrected Ted Kord until a DNA test proves his real identity and he is taken into custody. He is later freed by Circe, who orders him to disguise himself as Sarge Steel and investigate the events leading up to the "Amazons Attack" storyline.

In the aftermath, Everyman is captured and arrested by Nemesis. Shortly before the wedding of Green Arrow and Black Canary, Everyman attempts to kill Black Canary, who kills him with an arrow to the neck.

It is later revealed that Everyman survived Black Canary's attack, but sustained amnesia and believed himself to be Green Arrow. Black Canary identifies Everyman by the stab wound on his neck and attacks him alongside Green Arrow.

Everyman is later seen working with Cupid, a vigilante obsessed with Green Arrow, and calling himself Dark Arrow. The villain Cobalt activates nanites in Dark Arrow's bloodstream, compelling him to strangle Cupid. Dark Arrow overcomes the nanites' control, but Cupid injects him with a "love potion", placing him under her thrall. Cupid later betrays Everyman and fatally poisons him.

In Blackest Night, Everyman is temporarily resurrected as a Black Lantern.

== Powers and abilities ==
Everyman is a metahuman with the ability to duplicate any organic lifeform, provided he eats a small portion of it first. Everyman is unable to accurately duplicate non-organic matter, as evidenced when he replicated Sarge Steel, who possesses a metallic hand. Everyman's facsimile of the hand does not possess the durability of the original, with Nemesis managing to draw blood by stabbing it with a pencil.

== In other media ==
- Hannibal Bates / Everyman appears in the first season of The Flash, portrayed by Martin Novotny in his default form and several others while disguised. This version gained his abilities from exposure to dark matter during the explosion of S.T.A.R. Labs' particle accelerator. He is later killed by Joe West, but is resurrected after the multiverse is recreated in "Crisis on Infinite Earths".
- Everyman appears in Young Justice, voiced by Nolan North. This version is a member of the Light's Infinity, Inc., which is later reworked into the Infinitors.
