= Last Refuge (Legends of Tomorrow) =

- Legends of Tomorrow episode
- Episode no.: Season 1 Episode 12
- Directed by: Rachel Talalay
- Written by: Chris Fedak; Matthew Maala
- Production code: 4X6362
- Original air date: April 21, 2016

Guest appearances
- Faye Kingslee as The Pilgrim; Mitchell Kumman as young Mick Rory; Paul Blackthorne as Quentin Lance; Eli Goree as James Jackson

Episode chronology
← Previous "The Magnificent Eight"	Next → "Leviathan"
- Legends of Tomorrow season 1

"Last Refuge" is the twelfth episode of the first season of the American science fiction series Legends of Tomorrow. The series revolves around the eponymous team of superheroes and their time-traveling adventures. It is set in the Arrowverse, sharing continuity with the other television series of the universe. The episode was written by executive producer Chris Fedak and Matthew Maala, it was directed by Rachel Talalay.

"Last Refuge" features the Legends fight an assassin known as "The Pilgrim" who travels through time trying to kill their younger selves. Faye Kingslee guest stars as the titular character. It first premiered on The CW on April 21, 2016, to a live audience of 1.78 million viewers, the second worst ratings of the first season. The episode was critically panned for its weak plot and non-threatening villain.

== Plot ==
Due to the Legends disruption of the timeline, the Time Masters send an assassin known as the Pilgrim after the Legends. She sets out to kill the team's younger selves to erase them from time.

In 1990 Central City, the Legends protect Mick Rory's younger self managing to barely defeat the Pilgrim. Back on the Waverider, Gideon uses the Pilgrim's temporal distortions to predict her next move. After they rescue Sara Lance's younger self, Gideon loses track of the Pilgrim, allowing her to take out any of the team members without them knowing. Rip Hunter reveals that she only has one chance to kill each Legend before Ray Palmer suddenly starts bleeding internally. Kendra stays with Ray while the rest of the Legends travel to 2014 Starling City. The dying Ray proposes to Kendra and she says yes. The Legends once again barely defeat the Pilgrim.

Afterwards Rip decides to abduct the rest of the team's infant selves to prevent the Pilgrim from killing any of them. They are successful, bringing the infants to Rip's adoptive mother for her to look after until they can stop the Pilgrim. The Pilgrim kidnaps the team members' loved ones, threatening to kill them unless the members give themselves up.

Rip agrees to give up his younger self from before he became a Time Master, thus preventing the team's formation, in exchange for everyone's safety. The Legends, the Pilgrim, and young Rip meet at an abandoned Time Master base to make the trade. The Legends hand over young Rip before attacking the Pilgrim directly. The Pilgrim freezes them all in time but the young Rip stabs her to death.

Running out of time, Rip reveals that the Legends only have one more opportunity to stop Vandal Savage, at the peak of his power in 2166.

== Production ==
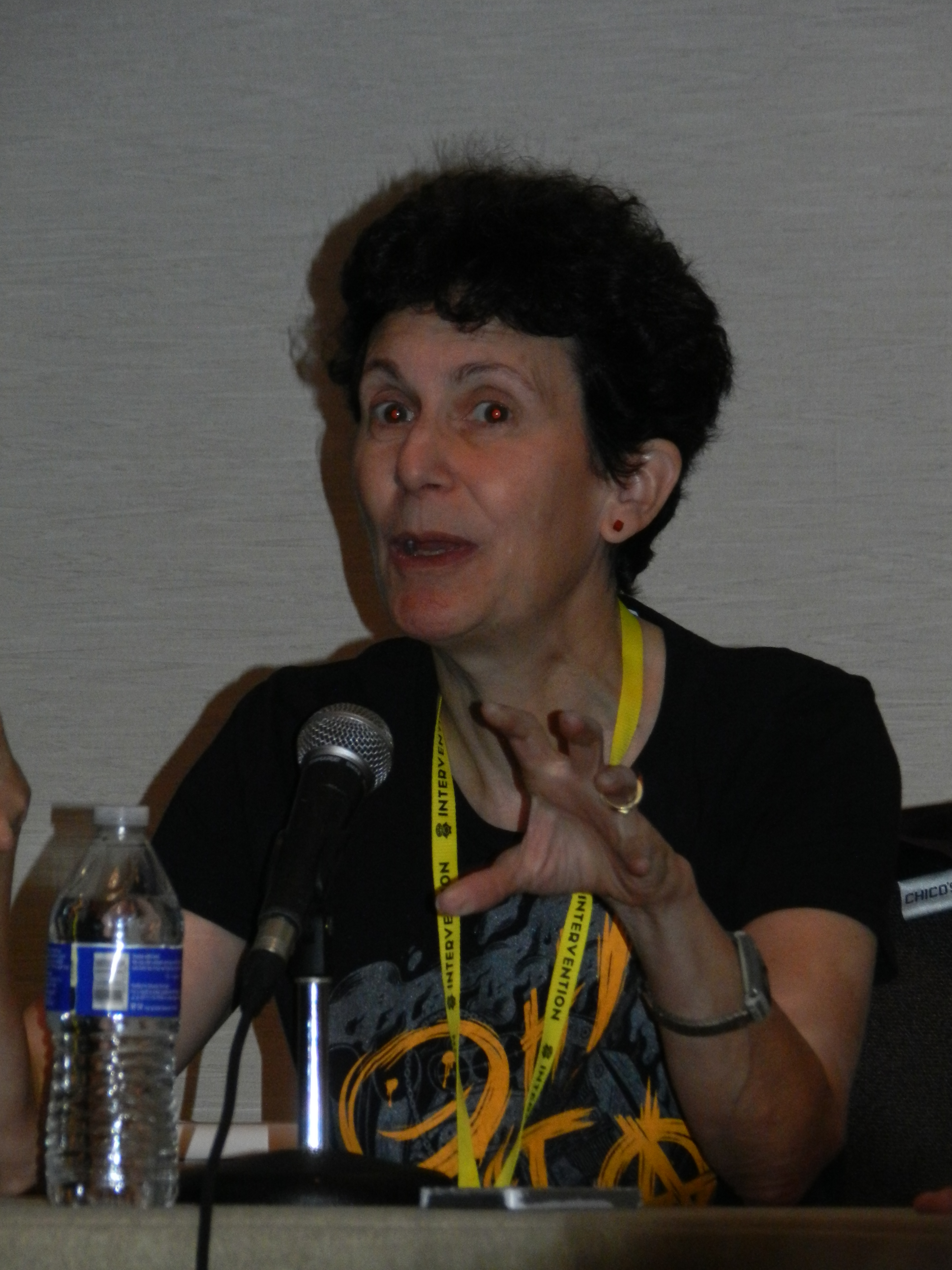
Director Rachel Talalay speaking at a panel on directing at Intervention Seven Con in Rockville, Maryland in 2016

"Last Refuge" was written by executive producer Chris Fedak and Matthew Maala and directed by Rachel Talalay. It was the first episode of television that Maala ever wrote. It was Fedak's second writing credit for the series. The episode's plot takes inspiration from the plot of the 1984 science fiction film The Terminator by James Cameron, the film was directly referenced in the episode. Additionally, it was one of several episodes in the first season of Legends of Tomorrow to feature kidnapping-related storylines.

The episode stars Arthur Darvill, Caity Lotz, Wentworth Miller, Dominic Purcell, Brandon Routh, Victor Garber, Franz Drameh, and Ciara Renée as Rip Hunter, Sara Lance, Leonard Snart, Mick Rory, Ray Palmer, Martin Stein, Jefferson "Jax" Jackson, and Kendra Saunders, respectively. While Mitchell Kumman and Aiden Longworth appeared as younger versions of Mick and Rip, the younger Sara and Ray were also portrayed by Lotz and Routh. Faye Kingslee guest stars as the episode's villain, The Pilgrim. Arrow, Legends of Tomorrow's parent series, star Paul Blackthorne made a guest appearance Quentin Lance. Celia Imrie and Eli Goree appeared as Rip's mother Mary Xavier and Jax's father, James Jackson, respectively.

== Release ==
"Last Refuge" first aired on The CW on April 21, 2016. The episode was viewed by an audience of 1.78 million viewers with a 0.6/2 percent share of adults 18–49. It was the lowest viewed broadcast in its timeslot, behind The Big Bang Theory, Grey's Anatomy, Bones, and Strong. Additionally, it was the second least viewed on both The CW and the night overall, ahead of The 100. "Last Refuge" was down around 200 thousand from the previous episode, "The Magnificent Eight". The episode was viewed around four thousand less than the following episode, "Leviathan". When accounting for seven-day DVR viewership, "Last Refuge" episode was seen by 3 million viewers. It was the second lowest viewed episode of the season overall, ahead of "River of Time".

=== Critical reception ===
The episode was met with negative reviews from critics. On the review aggregator website Rotten Tomatoes, 57% of 14 critics' reviews are positive, with an average rating of 6.92/10. The website's consensus reads: ""Last Refuge" finally presents the Legends with a formidable adversary, only to immediately disarm her and undermine the entire episode." The romantic subplot featuring Kendra and Ray was heavily disliked. However, the various guest stars did receive some praise.

Comic Book Resources's Dan Caffrey felt the main story had a good premise, but the episodes subplots were boring. Caffery noted that the sole exception was Mick's as the audience was familiar with the character allowing the emotional beats to hit properly. Nerdist's Blair Marnell felt that while the Pilgrim was the best villain the series had so far, she was still very generic. Marnell felt the various subplots were poorly executed; singling out Jax's father missing out on his birth as the worst. Den of Geek's Rob Leane rated the episode 2.5/5. He disliked the episode overall but praised the acting, Leane felt it was one of few redeeming factors. Vulture writer Angelica Jade Bastién disliked the episode, noting that the logic of the episode did not work and the Time Master's plan made no sense.

Writing for The A.V. Club, Oliver Sava graded the episode a "D+", the lowest score an episode of Legends of Tomorrow received from the site. He criticized the lack of stakes and the inconsistent internal logic. In his review, Sava wrote that the "design is as lazy as the action staging". This line was later quoted in the season four episode "Wet Hot American Bummer". In a 2022 interview with The A.V. Club, Ray Utarnachitt, one co-writers for "Wet Hot American Bummer", stated Sava's review stuck with Maala and he would frequently quote it.

IGN's Jesse Schedeen offered a positive review rating the episode a 7.8/10. He praised the development for Sara and Mick and enjoyed how it progressed the overall plot of the season. However, he found the romantic elements to be among the worst parts of the season.
