= Legends of Tomorrow season 1 =

Legends of Tomorrow
- Season 1
- Home media cover
- Starring: Victor Garber; Brandon Routh; Arthur Darvill; Caity Lotz; Franz Drameh; Ciara Renée; Falk Hentschel; Amy Pemberton; Dominic Purcell; Wentworth Miller
- No. of episodes: 16

Release
- Original network: The CW
- Original release: January 21 – May 19, 2016

Season chronology
- Next → Season 2

The first season of the American television series Legends of Tomorrow, which is based on characters from DC Comics, premiered on The CW on January 21, 2016, and ran for 16 episodes until May 19, 2016. The season follows a group of heroes and villains who are called to travel through time in order to fight a greater threat. It is set in the Arrowverse, sharing continuity with the other television series of the universe, and is a spin-off of both Arrow and The Flash. The season is produced by Berlanti Productions, Warner Bros. Television, and DC Entertainment, with Phil Klemmer and Chris Fedak serving as showrunners.

Legends of Tomorrow was given a series order in May 2015, and filming began that August. Arthur Darvill headlines the first season as Rip Hunter, with principal cast members Victor Garber, Brandon Routh, Caity Lotz, Franz Drameh, Ciara Renée, Falk Hentschel, Amy Pemberton, Dominic Purcell, and Wentworth Miller also starring. The season was followed by a second season.

== Episodes ==
Season one episodes
No. overall	No. in season	Title	Directed by	Written by	Original release date	Prod. code	U.S. viewers (millions)
1	1	"Pilot"	Glen Winter	Greg Berlanti & Marc Guggenheim & Andrew Kreisberg & Phil Klemmer	January 21, 2016	4X6351	3.21
2	2	"Pilot"	Glen Winter	Greg Berlanti & Marc Guggenheim & Andrew Kreisberg & Phil Klemmer	January 28, 2016	4X6352	2.89
Part 1 : In 2166, the immortal warrior Vandal Savage has conquered the entire planet. In an effort to save humanity, Time Master Rip Hunter travels back to 2016 to assemble a group of superheroes and supervillains to stop Savage's rise to power: Ray Palmer, Sara Lance, Jefferson Jackson and Martin Stein, Mick Rory, Leonard Snart, Carter Hall, and Kendra Saunders. Hunter takes them to 1975 to talk to Aldus Boardman, a leading expert on Savage. While providing information on Savage, Boardman also reveals that he is the son of Kendra and Carter from one of their past reincarnations. Meanwhile, a time-traveling bounty hunter named Chronos attacks Hunter's ship, the Waverider. The team is able to regroup and escape, but not before Boardman is mortally wounded. The attack forces Hunter to reveal that Chronos is after him for stealing the Waverider and going on the mission against the Time Council's wishes and that part of his quest is based on his desire for revenge on Savage for murdering his wife and son in 2166. All members agree to aid Hunter, who warns that time will resist against the mission. In Norway 1975, Savage is shown in possession of weapons of mass destruction. Part 2 : Still in 1975, the team infiltrates a weapons auction, where Savage intends to sell the nuclear warhead. Savage becomes aware of their presence. They all escape, but not before a piece of Ray's suit is left behind. Angry at the recklessness, Hunter points out what happens and how the technology of Ray's suit will be used to create super weapons that lead to the destruction of Central City in 2016. The team splits up, with Stein, Jax, and Sara retrieving the missing piece of Ray's suit by the help of Stein's younger self while Ray, Leonard, and Mick go in search of the dagger that killed Kendra and Carter in their first life. The dagger turns out to be in the home of Savage, who imprisons them and calls the rest of the team. Kendra and Carter go after Savage while the rest take on Savage's men. During the fight, Savage kills Carter with the dagger, revealing that only Kendra can wield it to kill him. She becomes injured, and the team is forced to retreat and plan a new strategy, determined to stop Savage.
3	3	"Blood Ties"	Dermott Downs	Marc Guggenheim & Chris Fedak	February 4, 2016	4X6353	2.32
While still in 1975, Kendra's injury stops the team from traveling through time, and Sara convinces Rip that another way to stop Savage would be to take away his financial resources. Rip locates the bank where Savage keeps his money and he and Sara go there to steal the funds. They learn that Savage is using Carter's blood to give his own men longer lives. Rip and his team engage Savage and reclaim Carter's body, but Rip inadvertently gives Savage the names of his family members before critically wounding him. Meanwhile, Kendra's condition worsens, requiring Ray to shrink down and enter her bloodstream to save her. Snart attempts to change his own family's fate, but his efforts ultimately change nothing. It is revealed that Rip once traveled to ancient Egypt 4000 years ago to kill Savage, but hesitated and has been known as a nemesis called Gareeb. The team buries Carter and Rip charts a course for 1986, so that the team can intercept Savage again.
4	4	"White Knights"	Antonio Negret	Sarah Nicole Jones & Phil Klemmer	February 7, 2016	4X6354	2.39
The team arrives in Washington, D.C., 1986 to stop Savage. They infiltrate the Pentagon and retrieve a file that points them toward scientist Valentina Vostok in the Soviet Union. Rip has Sara and Kendra work together to tame the feral nature that resides in each of them. Chronos tracks the team and Rip is forced to use Russian fighter jets to assist in taking down Chronos. While Ray and Snart go after Vostok, Rip tracks a time anomaly outside of Moscow. He finds his mentor, Zaman Druce, who offers to pardon Rip and return his new team to their time if Rip voluntarily surrenders. The pardon is revealed to be a trick and Druce attempts to kill Rip. With help from the team, Rip survives, but Chronos and Druce escape. Stein infiltrates a research lab and discovers Savage is trying to build an army with the same abilities as Firestorm. The former absorbs the energy in Savage's thermal core, which is returned to Rip by Snart; but Stein, Ray, and Mick are captured by the Soviets, with Vostok planning to use Stein for the project.
5	5	"Fail-Safe"	Dermott Downs	Beth Schwartz & Grainne Godfree	February 18, 2016	4X6355	2.25
The team brokers a deal with the Bratva to get into the gulag where Ray, Mick, and Stein are being held. Rip secretly tasks Sara with killing Stein, should they fail to rescue him. Savage has Ray and Mick tortured in front of Stein, forcing him to cooperate. Obtaining the formula, Valentina discovers that Stein is the other half of Firestorm. The team arrives at the gulag just as Valentina enters a reactor to start absorbing energy from a new thermal core. Snart rescues Mick and Ray, but Valentina merges with Stein to create a Soviet Firestorm. Jax is able to reach Stein's consciousness and force the two to separate. Without Stein or a quantum splicer, Valentina implodes. As the team moves into the time stream, they are attacked by Chronos, who forces them to crash land in a ruined Star City, 2046. They are confronted by a green-hooded archer whom they mistake for Oliver.
6	6	"Star City 2046"	Steve Shill	Marc Guggenheim & Ray Utarnachitt	February 25, 2016	4X6356	2.47
The archer attacks the team and they retreat back to the Waverider to make repairs and leave 2046. Rip, Sara, Snart, and Mick head to Smoak Industries, the new title of Palmer Tech, to find an essential part needed to repair the ship. Sara follows the vigilante, who turns out to be John Diggle, Jr. under the alias of Connor Hawke. It is revealed that 15 years prior, Grant Wilson, Slade's son, arrived in Star City with a Mirakuru army and took over. While searching through Oliver's old hideout, Sara and Rip find a 61-year-old Oliver, who directs them to where they can find the part, but refuses to help in the struggle. In a fight with Grant's men, Connor is taken prisoner. Sara convinces Oliver to resume the Green Arrow mantle. With the rest of Rip's team as backup, Oliver is able to defeat Grant for good. With the ship repaired, the team re-enters the time stream. Meanwhile, Jax and Ray develop feelings for Kendra, but realized that she does not want anyone in her life. Mick tells Snart about his desire to see the world burn instead of saving it.
7	7	"Marooned"	Gregory Smith	Anderson Mackenzie & Phil Klemmer	March 3, 2016	4X6357	2.28
Savage's trail goes cold and Rip is unable to track it without an upgrade to Gideon's software. The team receives a distress call from another time ship, the Acheron, in deep space. Rip decides to steal the ship's A.I. software. The former, Stein, Jax, and Mick board the Acheron, where everyone but Stein is captured by time pirates who want the Waverider, on which the pirates fire, damaging the hull. Sara and Snart attempt to fix the hull, but get locked in the room, from which the air is slowly leaking out. As Stein rescues the others, Ray manages to repair the hull. Mick betrays the team and leads the pirates to the Waverider. Rip and the others retake the Acheron while Sara and Snart stop Mick and the pirates on the Waverider. The Acheron's captain provides Gideon's upgrade and a tip on Savage's location. Ray and Kendra develop a romantic relationship. Snart apparently kills Mick at an unknown place and time. In flashbacks to the alternate timeline, Rip's future wife is revealed to be a Time Master. The Time Council finds out about their relationship, which is forbidden for Time Masters; and she resigns in order to save Rip's career.
8	8	"Night of the Hawk"	Joe Dante	Sarah Nicole Jones & Cortney Norris	March 10, 2016	4X6358	2.01
The team arrives in Oregon, 1958 to investigate a series of murders tied to Savage. Infiltrating a mental institution, Sara discovers that Savage is a psychiatrist there under another name. Ray and Kendra pose as a married couple to investigate in the suburbs, but discover that Savage lives there as well. Elsewhere, Jax is attacked by humanoid bird-like creatures created by Savage from an Nth metal meteorite similar to the one that gave Kendra and Carter their powers. Jax is abducted by the local sheriff and delivered to Savage. The team decides to go after Savage at the institution, where he has already infected Jax with the Nth metal and transformed him into one of the creatures. Kendra fails to kill Savage, who escapes. The rest of the team manages to recapture Jax. Stein and Gideon create a serum that cures Jax and the other victims. Chronos then arrives and storms the ship, forcing the Waverider to quickly leave, stranding Ray, Sara, and Kendra in 1958.
9	9	"Left Behind"	John F. Showalter	Beth Schwartz & Grainne Godfree	March 31, 2016	4X6359	1.97
Chronos disables the Waverider and flees back into the timestream, taking Snart with him. Rip is forced to reset Gideon to undo Chronos' sabotage, leaving the ship temporarily stranded in the timestream. Meanwhile, two years pass for Ray, Sara, and Kendra. Ray and Kendra build a life together while Sara rejoins the League of Assassins. Rip and the rest of the team arrive in 1960 and get Ray and Kendra. They travel to Nanda Parbat to rescue Sara, but she is revealed to have fully committed to Ra's al Ghul's mission and turns the team over to him as trespassers to be executed. Rip invokes the trial-by-combat ritual to save the team, with Kendra and Sara named as the champions to fight. Elsewhere, Chronos reveals himself to Snart as Mick, having been found by the Time Masters and trained to be their bounty hunter. Kendra is able to get through to Sara just as Chronos arrives. Ra's frees the team, who successfully stops Chronos and discovers his real identity. Ra's releases Sara and the others. Imprisoning Mick on the Waverider, the team decides to try to reform him. They head to 2147, their last stand against Savage.
10	10	"Progeny"	David Geddes	Phil Klemmer & Marc Guggenheim	April 7, 2016	4X6360	1.88
The team arrives in Kasnia, 2147. They discover Savage is personally grooming Per Degaton, son of Tor, the ruler. Rip reveals that when Per rises to power, he will unleash a virus that decimates most of the planet and allows Savage to kill Per and conquer the world. The team decides to remove Per from the timeline and prevent Savage's rise to power. The kidnapping does not affect the timeline, so Rip releases Per and implores him not to let Savage influence his decisions. However, Per kills Tor on Savage's advice, accelerating the latter's rise. Meanwhile, Ray finds his suit's technology has been used to create autonomous policing robots that Savage will use to help conquer the world and that the family line of his brother, Sydney, founded the company that created them. After settling his differences with Snart for the moment, Mick reveals that the Time Masters have released a group called the "Hunters," whose sole purpose will be to track down the team and kill each of them, including Mick for his failure.
11	11	"The Magnificent Eight"	Thor Freudenthal	Story by : Greg Berlanti & Marc Guggenheim; Teleplay by : Marc Guggenheim	April 12, 2016 (Note: "The Magnificent Eight" premiered earlier in Canada on CTV before it premiered April 14 on the CW.)	4X6361	1.98
The team travels to Salvation, Dakota Territory in 1871 to hide out from the Hunters. While Rip decides their next move, the rest of the team goes into town, where they meet Rip's old acquaintance Jonah Hex, who knows they are time travelers. Kendra gets flashbacks from one of her previous lives and goes to investigate, while the others head back to town to defend against the Jeb Stillwater gang. Kendra and Sara follow the former's visions to an old woman, who turns out to be the Kendra from that time period. The past Kendra warns her future incarnation not to love a different man, as it will always end in either heartbreak or tragedy. The team goes after the Stillwater gang and captures their leader, Jeb, but Jax is apprehended as they escape. The team sets up a quick draw duel between Rip and Jeb to barter for Jax's life. Rip wins, but the Hunters arrive before the team can leave. They defeat the Hunters, but not before they learn that the Time Masters have sent a bounty hunter with temporal powers known as the "Pilgrim" to kill their younger selves, thus erasing the members from the timeline.
12	12	"Last Refuge"	Rachel Talalay	Chris Fedak & Matthew Maala	April 21, 2016	4X6362	1.78
Gideon uses the Pilgrim's temporal distortions to predict her next move. After they successfully rescue Mick and Sara's younger selves, Gideon loses track of the Pilgrim's movements, allowing her to take out any of the team members without them knowing. The Pilgrim goes after Ray in 2014, but the team arrives just in time to save his former self and prevent Ray's death. Rip decides to abduct the rest of the team's infant selves to prevent the Pilgrim from killing any selves of them. They are successful, bringing the infants to Rip's adoptive mother for her to look after until they can stop the Pilgrim. The Pilgrim kidnaps the team members' loved ones, threatening to kill them unless the members give themselves up. Rip agrees to give up his younger self from before he became a Time Master, thus preventing the team's formation, in exchange for everyone's safety. The Pilgrim agrees, but the team sets a trap for her, managing to kill her. Afterward, Ray and Kendra become engaged. Rip says that the only time to stop Savage is in 2166, at the peak of the latter's power.
13	13	"Leviathan"	Gregory Smith	Sarah Nicole Jones & Ray Utarnachitt	April 28, 2016	4X6363	1.86
The team travels to London, 2166 to try to eliminate Savage just before he finally takes over the world. While investigating Savage, Kendra notices that one of his female officers is wearing a bracelet that she originally wore when she first died in ancient Egypt. The team plans to retrieve the bracelet, knowing that it will help them kill Savage. They also join forces with local rebels. The officer turns out to be Cassandra, Savage's daughter. Snart kidnaps her and manages to convince her to assist them. Rory helps Kendra melt the bracelet down and coat Carter's mace so that it can be used to kill Savage. Savage's giant robot called the Leviathan attacks the Waverider. While the others go after Savage, Ray reverses the polarity of his suit so that he can grow in size and takes out the Leviathan. The mace works, but Kendra refuses to kill Savage when she learns that he has brainwashed that generation's incarnation of Carter to be his soldier. To save Carter's mind, she and Rip imprison Savage on the Waverider.
14	14	"River of Time"	Alice Troughton	Cortney Norris & Anderson Mackenzie	May 5, 2016	4X6364	1.63
Upon the revelation that the Leviathan was technology from the distant future, proving Savage has manipulated time, Rip believes the Time Masters will finally ratify his mission and sets course for the Vanishing Point. Jax fixes the damaged time drive, but is exposed to time radiation which ages him prematurely. Stein is forced to send him back to 2016 in the jump ship to reverse the process. Carter, now named Scythian Torvil, is kept prisoner while Kendra tries to restore his memories, causing a rift between her and Ray which effectively ends their relationship. Savage tries to manipulate some of the team members, allowing him to escape his cell. Just as Savage is about to kill Kendra, Scythian regains his memories as Carter and saves her, but is stabbed by Savage before Kendra knocks the latter unconscious. The team arrives at the Vanishing Point, where the Time Masters reveal that they have been working with Savage, who is to be sent back to 2166 to carry on with his plan while Rip and his team are put under arrest.
15	15	"Destiny"	Olatunde Osunsanmi	Story by : Marc Guggenheim; Teleplay by : Phil Klemmer & Chris Fedak	May 12, 2016	4X6365	1.89
Kendra and Scythian are turned over to Savage as he returns to 2166, when he kills Rip's family again. Sara and Snart, who evaded capture, make plans to rescue the team with the help of Gideon. Druce explains to Rip that the Time Masters helped Savage because an alien race from the planet Thanagar will attack Earth in 2175 and only Savage is able to unite the world and stop them. Druce also reveals the Oculus, which the Time Masters used to manipulate Rip's team among various others to facilitate Savage's rise to power, including orchestrating the murder of Rip's family. Snart and Sara disable the other time ships and rescue the others. The team decides to destroy the Oculus, only to find Druce waiting for them with soldiers. Having recruited Martin's 2016 self to help him, Jax returns in the jump ship and kills the soldiers. But the success of the Oculus' self-destruct costs the life of Snart, who takes Druce out with him. Savage learns of the unpredictability of the timeline due to the destruction of the Oculus and decides to make use of the time traveling technology at his disposal.
16	16	"Legendary"	Dermott Downs	Story by : Greg Berlanti & Chris Fedak; Teleplay by : Phil Klemmer & Marc Guggenheim	May 19, 2016	4X6366	1.85
Kendra leaves a message for the team alerting them to Savage's presence in France, 1944; but they are unable to stop him and only manage to rescue Scythian. Savage reveals that the Thanagarians sent three meteors to ancient Egypt; and he plans to use Kendra's and Scythian's blood to activate the meteors' alien technology and erase time back to 1700 BC, where he can rule. Stein deduces Savage's method, also concluding that radiation from all three meteors will render Savage mortal, so anyone can kill him. The team breaks up into pairs, traveling to 1958, 1975, and 2021. All three groups capture Savage and then kill him. Ray and Firestorm destroy two of the meteors, and Rip uses the Waverider to send the last meteor into the Sun before it can explode and destroy the Earth. Kendra and Scythian stay behind to defend in 2016 while the others decide to help Rip protect the timeline. Before they can leave 2016, however, Rex Tyler arrives in a future version of the Waverider and warns the team of their impending death.

== Cast and characters ==
=== Main ===
- Victor Garber as Martin Stein / Firestorm
- Brandon Routh as Ray Palmer / Atom
- Arthur Darvill as Rip Hunter
- Caity Lotz as Sara Lance / White Canary
- Franz Drameh as Jefferson "Jax" Jackson / Firestorm
- Ciara Renée as Kendra Saunders / Hawkgirl
- Falk Hentschel as Carter Hall / Hawkman (Note: Hentschel is credited in the main cast through "Pilot, Part 2". His subsequent appearances are as a recurring guest star.)
- Amy Pemberton as Gideon
- Dominic Purcell as Mick Rory / Heat Wave
- Wentworth Miller as Leonard Snart / Captain Cold

=== Recurring ===
- Casper Crump as Vandal Savage
- Alex Duncan as Miranda Coburn
- Martin Donovan as Zaman Druce

=== Guest ===
- Stephen Amell as Oliver Queen / Green Arrow and Oliver Queen / Green Arrow (Earth-16)
- Katie Cassidy as Laurel Lance
- Peter Francis James as Aldus Boardman
- Neal McDonough as Damien Darhk
- Graeme McComb as young Martin Stein
- Jason Beaudoin as Lewis Snart
- Cameron Bancroft as Mr. Blake
- Stephanie Corneliussen as Valentina Vostok
- Carlos Valdes as Cisco Ramon
- Joseph David-Jones as John Diggle Jr. / Connor Hawke / Green Arrow (Earth-16)
- Nick Gracer as Yuri the Bear
- Jamie Andrew Cutler as Grant Wilson / Deathstroke (Earth-16)
- Callum Keith Rennie as Jon Valor
- Peter Bryant as Declan
- Stephanie Cleough as Eve Baxter
- Ali Liebert as Lindsay Carlisle
- Melissa Roxburgh as Betty Seaver
- Daryl Shuttleworth as Bud Ellison
- Laura Mennell as Gail Knox
- Matt Nable as Ra's al Ghul
- Jewel Staite as Bryce
- Cory Grüter-Andrew as Per Degaton
- Matthew Harrison as Tor Degaton
- Johnathon Schaech as Jonah Hex
- Anna Deavere Smith as Chay-Ara (19th Century reincarnation)
- Anna Galvin as Sarah Neal
- Brent Stait as Jeb Stillwater
- Paul Blackthorne as Quentin Lance
- Faye Kingslee as The Pilgrim
- Celia Imrie as Mary Xavier
- Eli Goree as James Jackson
- Jessica Sipos as Cassandra Savage
- Emily Bett Rickards as Felicity Smoak
- Isabella Hofmann as Clarissa Stein
- Stacie Greenwell as Jefferson Jackson's mother
- Katrina Law as Nyssa al Ghul
- Patrick J. Adams as Rex Tyler / Hourman

== Production ==
=== Development ===
In January 2015, co-creator Greg Berlanti stated that there were "very early" preliminary talks for an additional spin-off series centered on Ray Palmer / Atom (Brandon Routh), from Arrow and The Flash. In February 2015, it was reported that a spin-off series, described as a superhero team-up show, was in discussion by The CW for a possible 2015–16 midseason release. Berlanti, Andrew Kreisberg, Marc Guggenheim, and Sarah Schechter would serve as executive producers. The potential series would be headlined by several recurring characters from both Arrow and The Flash, including Palmer, Leonard Snart (Wentworth Miller), and Martin Stein (Victor Garber). Caity Lotz was also mentioned to be among the main cast. There would be potential for other Arrow/Flash characters to cross over to the new series, and the series would be casting "three major DC Comics characters who have never appeared in a TV series".

In March 2015, Stephen Amell, who portrays Oliver Queen / Green Arrow on Arrow, confirmed the series would air in the 2015–16 midseason. Additionally, Kreisberg stated more would be revealed about the nature of the series by the end of Arrow's third season, specifically why Lotz is slated to appear, given her previous character, Sara, was killed at the start of Arrow season three. Berlanti also stated there was a particular reason for the other half of Firestorm—Ronnie Raymond (Robbie Amell), as seen on The Flash—not being mentioned in the initial cast announcement. On the purpose of the series, Berlanti said it was designed to be "most similar to our crossover episodes, where you feel that 'event-iness', but all the time. For us, first and foremost, with all of [our shows], it's about 'how is it its own thing?' Because we don't just want to do it to do it." He also revealed the producers were focusing on "making sure that the villain that we have on [the] show is distinct too... another big character who hasn't been used yet." Also in March, Dominic Purcell was revealed to be reprising his role as Heat Wave in the series, and Blake Neely, composer of Arrow and The Flash, would serve as composer. At the end of the month, Arthur Darvill was cast as Rip Hunter, while Ciara Renée was cast as Kendra Saunders / Hawkgirl. In April 2015, in a Variety article on the recent MipTV event, it noted the title for the series would be Legends of Tomorrow, despite it still being unconfirmed by those involved with the series. Also in the month, Franz Drameh was cast as Jefferson Jackson. Keiynan Lonsdale, who would eventually play Wally West / Kid Flash as a regular in the third season, had originally auditioned for this role. Amy Pemberton was chosen to voice Gideon, the artificial intelligence of the Waverider.

In May 2015, Garber said that The CW was impressed with what was shown to them, giving the project a straight-to-series order. The network officially confirmed the order for the series on May 7, 2015, as well as the official title, DC's Legends of Tomorrow. Later in the month, it was confirmed that Lotz would reprise her role as Sara Lance, who would be taking the name White Canary, as well as revealing the antagonist as Vandal Savage. In June 2015, it was announced that Phil Klemmer had been made the series showrunner as well as executive producer; Chris Fedak serves as executive producer and co-showrunner with Klemmer. In August 2015, Casper Crump was cast as Savage, and Falk Hentschel as Carter Hall / Hawkman. Although initially advertised as a regular cast member, Hentschel was credited as a guest star for his appearances in episodes airing after the season's second episode. In January 2016, Martin Donovan was cast as Rip Hunter's mentor Zaman Druce, a Time Master.

=== Filming ===
In May 2015, Garber revealed filming would begin in August 2015, for a January 2016 premiere. The series shot a presentation for the network's upfront showcase, which was filmed over the course of one night, and directed by Arrow and The Flash veteran Dermott Downs. Filming of the series began on September 9, 2015, in Vancouver, British Columbia. Director/producer Glen Winter discussed in a January 2016 interview with Comic Book Resources the process of filming key elements of the series' pilot,

The new facet for Legends was that there's no #1 [actor] on the call sheet. There are seven or eight leads. For me, that was the intimidating part. I wasn't as worried about the action and tone as I was with wrangling all these personalities and finding out how they all work together. Or, how to shoot a scene with eight people in the Waverider, day after day.

He stated of the series style of shooting on location as opposed to predominantly shooting on a soundstage,

As is typical with any pilot, most of the time you are going to shoot more on location. Because you don't necessarily know if you are going to have a show that's been picked up, they don't want to invest a lot of money in the infrastructure, so you end up shooting more on location. The only set that was built was the Waverider. That being said, because we knew there was a pickup for the show, it wasn't a conventional pilot. All the resources of construction went into the Waverider. That's continuing into the series. I don't think they tend to build much. I think they tend to adapt locations because there's so much time travel and so many eras to create.

== Release ==
=== Broadcast ===
The season began airing on January 21, 2016, on The CW in the United States, and concluded on May 19, 2016. The series premiere was prefaced with a special airing on January 19, 2016, titled "DC's Legends of Tomorrow: Their Time Is Now". It featured the origin stories of the heroes and villains of the season, as well as show clips and interviews. The series premiere in Australia was originally announced as January 20, 2016, however it was pushed back until January 22. It started airing in the United Kingdom on March 3, 2016.

=== Home media ===
The season was released on Blu-ray on August 23, 2016.

== Reception ==
=== Ratings ===
Viewership and ratings per episode of Legends of Tomorrow season 1
No.	Title	Air date	Rating/share (18–49)	Viewers (millions)	DVR (18–49)	DVR viewers (millions)	Total (18–49)	Total viewers (millions)
1	"Pilot, Part 1"	January 21, 2016	1.2/4	3.21	0.9	2.03	2.1	5.24
2	"Pilot, Part 2"	January 28, 2016	1.1/3	2.89	0.8	1.64	1.9	4.54
3	"Blood Ties"	February 4, 2016	0.9/3	2.32	0.7	1.63	1.6	3.95
4	"White Knights"	February 11, 2016	0.9/3	2.39	0.6	1.40	1.5	3.80
5	"Fail-Safe"	February 18, 2016	0.8/3	2.25	0.7	1.47	1.5	3.71
6	"Star City 2046"	February 25, 2016	0.9/3	2.47	0.7	1.41	1.6	3.88
7	"Marooned"	March 3, 2016	0.9/3	2.28	—N/a	1.32	—N/a	3.60
8	"Night of the Hawk"	March 10, 2016	0.7/2	2.01	0.6	1.21	1.3	3.23
9	"Left Behind"	March 31, 2016	0.7/2	1.97	0.5	1.17	1.2	3.14
10	"Progeny"	April 7, 2016	0.7/3	1.88	0.6	1.23	1.3	3.23
11	"The Magnificent Eight"	April 14, 2016	0.7/3	1.98	0.5	1.19	1.2	3.19
12	"Last Refuge"	April 21, 2016	0.6/2	1.78	0.6	1.22	1.2	3.00
13	"Leviathan"	April 28, 2016	0.7/2	1.86	0.6	1.33	1.3	3.19
14	"River of Time"	May 5, 2016	0.6/2	1.63	0.5	1.15	1.1	2.78
15	"Destiny"	May 12, 2016	0.7/3	1.89	0.5	1.18	1.2	3.08
16	"Legendary"	May 19, 2016	0.7/3	1.85	0.5	1.28	1.2	3.13

=== Critical response ===
The pilot was well reviewed for its potential. Russ Burlingame from ComicBook.com praised it saying, "The series delivers a sharp, enjoyable pilot that's arguably the most attention-grabbing and entertaining from any of the current crop of superhero shows." Jesse Schedeen of IGN gave the first part of the pilot episode a 7.7/10, praising the show's "epic scope", "fun character dynamics", and Arthur Darvill's performance; and gave the second part of the pilot an 8.4/10, saying it "improved in its sophomore episode thanks to great character dynamics and superhero action".

However the series was met with mixed reviews, review aggregation website Rotten Tomatoes gave the complete season only a 65% approval rating, with an average rating of 6.42/10 based on 267 reviews. The website's consensus reads: "Fancy effects, comic-book nostalgia, and an alluring cast help keep it afloat, but DC's Legends of Tomorrow suffers from an overloaded cast of characters that contribute to a distractingly crowded canvas." Metacritic, which uses a weighted average, assigned a score of 58 out of 100 based on reviews from 22 critics, indicating "mixed or average" reviews.

Reviewing the season as a whole, Jesse Schedeen said, "It's interesting to see where Legends of Tomorrow ended its first season in relation to where it started. Early on, the show's plodding pace caused it to lag behind The Flash and Arrow. But the show eventually found its voice and managed to end on a stronger note than either of its sister series. Even in those weeks where the pointless romantic drama or the conflict with Vandal Savage failed to inspire much excitement, the memorable character dynamics made this show a joy to watch." J. C. Macek III of PopMatters said, "While not without its flaws, Legends of Tomorrow is just too good to ignore. There are big surprises in every episode, but the biggest surprise is that the first season actually is a really good show." Writing for Rolling Stone, Alan Sepinwall described the season as "dull and boring" feeling that the other seasons of the show greatly improve on it. In a retrospective for ComicBook.com, Marco Vito Oddo felt that Kendra and Conner's arcs were poorly handled and that the series wasted their potential.

=== Accolades ===
Award nominations for Legends of Tomorrow, season 1
Year	Award	Category	Nominee(s)	Result	Ref.
2016	Saturn Awards	Best Superhero Adaption Television Series	Legends of Tomorrow	Nominated	
2016	The Joey Awards	Young Actor in a TV Series Featured Role 6–10 Years	Glen Gordon	Won	
2016	The Joey Awards	Young Actor in an Action TV Series Guest Starring/Principal Role	Aiden Longworth	Nominated	
2016	The Joey Awards	Young Actor in an Action TV Series Guest Starring/Principal Role	Cory Gruter-Andrew	Nominated	
2016	The Joey Awards	Young Actor in an Action TV Series Guest Starring/Principal Role	Mitchell Kummen	Won	
2016	The Joey Awards	Young Actor in a TV Series Recurring Role 6–9 Years	Kiefer O'Reilly	Won	
