= Black Canary =

DC comics superheroine

- Cover art of Black Canary: Best of the Best #5 (March 2025), featuring Dinah Laurel Lance (left) and Dinah Drake (right) as the Black Canary. Art by Ryan Sook.

Publication information
- Publisher: DC Comics
- First appearance: Dinah Drake: Flash Comics #86 (August 1947); Dinah Laurel Lance: Justice League of America #75 (November 1969)
- Created by: Robert Kanigher; Carmine Infantino

In-story information
- Species: Human (Dinah Drake); Metahuman (Dinah Lance)
- Team affiliations: Dinah Drake: Justice Society of America; Dinah Laurel Lance: Justice League; Birds of Prey
- Partnerships: Dinah Drake; Larry Lance; Dinah Lance; Green Arrow; Oracle; Huntress; Manhunter
- Abilities: Expert martial artist, hand-to-hand combatant, and stick fighter; Expert strategist, tactician, and field commander; Peak human physical and mental conditioning; Proficient in utilizing various high-tech equipment and weapons; Powerful sonic scream (Dinah Lance)

Black Canary is the name of two superheroines appearing in American comic books published by DC Comics. As one of the earliest female superheroes in the DC Comics universe, the character has made numerous appearances in prominent team-up titles, including the Justice Society of America and Justice League of America. The Black Canary persona has been adopted by two individuals, portrayed as legacy heroes with a mother-daughter relationship between the two. Following DC's New 52 initiative, Black Canary was briefly amalgamated as a single character before the mother-and-daughter dynamic was restored to continuity.

Dinah Drake, the original Black Canary, was created by the writer-artist team of Robert Kanigher and Carmine Infantino, the character debuted in Flash Comics #86 on July 31, 1947 (cover dated August 1947) in the Golden Age of Comic Books. Strong, mysterious, gutsy and romantic, she has been called "the archetype of the new Film Noir era heroine." She is a prominent member of the Justice Society of America and gifted martial artist who engaged in crime-fighting exploits alongside her love interest and eventual husband, Larry Lance, a detective in Gotham City. Their union resulted in the birth of their daughter, Dinah Laurel Lance. In subsequent narratives following the Crisis on Infinite Earths event, her daughter succeeds her mother as the new Black Canary. Dinah Drake is typically depicted as a skilled hand-to-hand combatant without superhuman abilities compared to her daughter and successor.

The second Black Canary, Dinah Laurel Lance, was created by Dennis O'Neil and Dick Dillin, first appearing in Justice League of America #75 (November, 1969). The character is often depicted as the daughter of the original Dinah Drake, possessing metahuman abilities and being highly skilled in martial arts. She is prominently associated with the Justice League, Birds of Prey, and has had a significant relationship with Green Arrow alongside his allies. During Black Canary's brief period as a composite character in the New 52, she was known as Dinah Laurel Lance (née Drake).

Black Canary has been adapted into various media, including direct-to-video animated films, video games, and in live-action and animated television series. Dinah Laurel is portrayed by Rachel Skarsten in the TV series Birds of Prey, as well as in Smallville, portrayed by Alaina Huffman. Several versions appear in the TV show Arrow, with sisters Laurel and Sara Lance being portrayed by Katie Cassidy and Caity Lotz, along with Alex Kingston as their civilian mother Dinah, and Juliana Harkavy as Dinah Drake in later seasons. Dinah Lance made her cinematic debut in the DC Extended Universe film Birds of Prey, portrayed by Jurnee Smollett.

== Creation ==
Robert Kanigher and Carmine Infantino created the character in 1947 to be featured in Flash Comics as a supporting character. Appearing first as a clandestine crime-fighter who infiltrates criminal organizations to break them from the inside, the Black Canary was drawn with fishnet stockings and a black leather jacket to connote images of a sexualized yet strong female character. She appeared as a character in a back-up story featuring Johnny Thunder:

I was drawing Johnny Thunder, which was not much of a character. I suppose he could have been better because his 'Thunderbolt' was interesting, but the situations they were in were pretty juvenile. Bob Kanigher wrote those stories, and he had no respect for the characters. These stories were nowhere near as good as 'The Flash' stories. DC knew it—they knew 'Johnny Thunder' was a loser, so Kanigher and I brought the Black Canary into the series. Immediately she got a good response, and it was, 'Bye, bye, Johnny Thunder.' Nobody missed him.

— Carmine Infantino

According to Amash and Nolen-Weathington (2010), Black Canary is "really" Carmine Infantino's "first character". According to the artist:

When Kanigher gave me the script, I said, 'How do you want me to draw her?' He said, 'What's your fantasy of a good-looking girl? That's what I want.' Isn't that a great line? So that's what I did. I made her strong in character and sexy in form. The funny part is that years later, while in Korea on a National Cartoonists trip, I met a dancer who was the exact image of the Black Canary. And I went out with her for three years.

Bob didn't ask me for a character sketch [for the Black Canary]. He had a lot of respect for me, I must say that. He always trusted my work... Bob loved my Black Canary design.

=== Golden Age bibliography ===
During the Golden Age of Comic Books, Dinah Drake's adventures were featured in:

- Flash Comics #86-88, 90-104 (Aug 1947-Feb 1949)
- All Star Comics #38-57 (Jan 1948-March 1951)
- Comic Cavalcade #25 (Feb 1948)

== Publication history ==
Cover of Flash Comics #92 (February 1948); art by Carmine Infantino

At her Golden Age debut, the Black Canary was the alter ego of Dinah Drake and participated in crime-fighting adventures with her love interest (and eventual husband), Gotham City detective Larry Lance. Initially, the character was a hand-to-hand fighter without superpowers who often posed as a criminal to infiltrate criminal gangs. She first meets the Justice Society of America in All Star Comics #38 (December 1947-January 1948), joining them in All Star Comics #41 (June–July 1948). Black Canary's foes included criminal circus act Carno and His Masked Riders, and the Sacred Order of the Crimson Crystal.

Black Canary was revived with the other Golden Age characters during the 1960s. In these stories, it is retroactively established she lives on the parallel world of Earth-2 (home of DC's Golden Age versions of its characters), in Ireland. Married to Larry Lance since the 1950s, Dinah participates in annual team-ups between the Justice Society and Earth-1's Justice League of America. This period also marks the moment in which the character is given her signature superpower: the "canary cry", a high-powered sonic scream which could shatter objects and incapacitate and even kill powerful foes. When DC Comics adjusted its continuity, the Black Canary was established as two separate entities: mother and daughter, Dinah Drake-Lance and Dinah Laurel Lance. Stories since the Silver Age focused on the younger Black Canary, ascribing her superhuman abilities to a genetic mutation.

Following the universe-altering events of Crisis on Infinite Earths (concluding in March 1986), the Black Canary's history was revised again. The mind-transplant story of 1983 was discarded; in this version of the story, the present-day Black Canary is Dinah Laurel Lance, who inherits the identity from her mother, Dinah Drake-Lance. Although some references (for example, those in James Robinson's Starman series) tried to distinguish between the two Canaries by calling the first "Diana", recent accounts have confirmed Dinah as the mother's given name.

The two Canaries' origin stories were told in full in Secret Origins (vol. 2) #50 (August 1990). In this story, Dinah Drake is trained by her father, detective Richard Drake, intending to follow him on the Gotham City police force. When she is turned down, her disillusioned father dies shortly afterwards. Determined to honor his memory, Dinah fights crime and corruption by any possible means. She becomes a costumed vigilante, using her inheritance to open a flower shop as her day job. Dinah marries her lover, private eye Larry Lance, and several years later their daughter, Dinah Laurel Lance, is born (Birds of Prey #66 (June 2004) would establish that they took the name "Laurel" from a librarian Dinah befriended during a case).

A Black Canary miniseries by writer Greg Weisman and artist Mike Sekowsky was planned in 1984. Although its first issue was pencilled, the project was shelved due to the character's use in writer-artist Mike Grell's high-profile Green Arrow: The Longbow Hunters series. Elements of the project were used in Weisman's short film, DC Showcase: Green Arrow.

=== The New 52 version and beyond ===
During DC's The New 52 era which began in 2011, Black Canary was portrayed as a single character with a metahuman Canary Cry resulting from government experiments on an alien child named Ditto. This version of Black Canary founded the Birds of Prey on her own, and led the super-team Team 7 alongside her husband Kurt Lance, before later becoming lead singer in a rock band called Black Canary. After five years, DC later began to row back on controversial New 52 continuity changes with its DC Rebirth initiative, with the narrator of Geoff Johns' DC Rebirth #1, Wally West, lamenting, from outside the universe, on how Black Canary and Green Arrow hardly know each other anymore, when they should be husband and wife, as a result of sinister alterations to the timeline. The comic shows the pair briefly meeting, by chance, and then separately staying up at night, contemplating what is missing from their lives. They meet again in Green Arrow Rebirth #1, and instantly hit it off. As part of Rebirth, Black Canary also re-establishes the traditional Birds of Prey line up with Batgirl and Huntress, and also joins the Justice League of America.

Following subsequent continuity-restoring events in Doomsday Clock and Dark Nights: Death Metal, the current Black Canary is re-established as being the daughter of her Golden Age predecessor, fully reversing the controversial New 52 changes and bringing an end to the distinctive New 52 version of the character. The largely erased New 52 versions of the DC heroes were established as residing on Earth-52 in the comic book miniseries Doomsday Clock.

During the DC Rebirth era, Black Canary is handpicked by Batman to become a member of the Justice League of America to fight against a group of Extremists along with Vixen, Lobo, Killer Frost, Ray, and Atom.

In the Dawn of DC era, Black Canary leads an all-new team of Birds of Prey. Some of the members are Harley Quinn, Big Barda and Zealot.

In 2024, Black Canary received a solo series, Black Canary: Best of the Best, where she battles Lady Shiva for the title of the world's most skilled martial artist.

== Character overview ==
A recurring theme within the Black Canary characters is the striking similarities they possess, both in terms of their personalities and fighting styles, even though they were trained by different masters or had different upbringings.

=== Reputation ===
Both iterations of Black Canary are recognized as legacy heroes who have achieved renown for their exceptional skills as world-class detectives and martial artists. Despite operating in different time periods, both characters have earned a reputation as being among the best in the world in their respective fields. The martial arts skills of the second Black Canary are consistently portrayed as highly formidable and widely regarded among the best in the world. Within her publication history, she has faced notable opponents within the DC Universe, including Bronze Tiger, Cheshire, Lady Shiva, and Rabbit of the Twelve Brothers in Silk, who are considered to be nearly on par with Shiva. Additionally, Oracle holds the belief that Black Canary has the potential to defeat Batman in combat.

== Fictional character biography ==
=== Dinah Drake ===
Dinah Drake as the original Black Canary in Flash Comics #86 (August 1947). Art by Carmine Infantino

Dinah Drake made her debut in Flash Comics #86 (August 1947) as a supporting character in the "Johnny Thunder" feature, written by Robert Kanigher and drawn by Carmine Infantino. She initially appeared as a villain. Johnny is instantly infatuated with her, and is reproached by his Thunderbolt. Dinah is later revealed to have been infiltrating a criminal gang.

In Flash Comics #92 (February 1948) she has her own anthology feature, "Black Canary", replacing "Johnny Thunder". The new series fleshed out Black Canary's backstory: Dinah Drake was a black-haired florist in love with Larry Lance, a Gotham City Police Department detective. She first meets the Justice Society of America in All Star Comics #38 (December 1947-January 1948), joining them in All Star Comics #41 (June–July 1948). Black Canary's foes include criminal circus act Carno and His Masked Riders, and the Sacred Order of the Crimson Crystal.

Black Canary was revived with the other Golden Age characters during the 1960s. In these stories, it is retroactively established she lives on the parallel world of Earth-2 (home of DC's Golden Age versions of its characters) in Ireland. Married to Larry Lance since the 1950s, Dinah participates in annual team-ups between the Justice Society and Earth-1's Justice League of America.

In a 1969 JLA/JSA team-up against the rogue star-creature Aquarius, who banished Earth-2's inhabitants (except the JSA) to another dimension, Larry Lance is killed saving Dinah's life and Aquarius is defeated. Grief-stricken, Canary moves to Earth-1 and joins the Justice League. She begins a relationship with JLA colleague Green Arrow and discovers that she has developed an ultrasonic scream, the "canary cry."

Black Canary teams with Batman five times in The Brave and the Bold and once with Superman in DC Comics Presents. Appearing frequently as a guest in the "Green Arrow" backup feature of Action Comics, she was a backup feature in World's Finest Comics #244 (April–May 1977) to #256 (April–May 1979) (when the title was in Dollar Comics format). Black Canary's backstory was featured in DC Special Series #10 (April 1978). After the "Black Canary" feature in World's Finest Comics, she appears as a guest in its "Green Arrow" feature and in Detective Comics.

A story in Justice League of America #219-220 (October and November 1983) served to explain the origin of Black Canary's new sonic scream powers, and further, why she continued to appear youthful despite being active since the late 1940s (thereby making her nearly 60 years old). It was established that during the 1950s, she and Larry had a daughter, Dinah Laurel Lance, who was cursed by the Wizard with a devastating sonic scream. Her mother hoped that Johnny Thunder's Thunderbolt could cure her, but the Thunderbolt was only able to keep the younger Dinah in suspended animation in his own dimension. To ease their pain, the Thunderbolt altered the memories of the tragedy, leaving all to believe Dinah's daughter had simply died. Following the battle with Aquarius, Dinah discovered she was dying from radiation exposure, and she asked to see her daughter's grave one last time. Shown the body of her daughter—still in suspended animation, but now grown to adulthood—Dinah wished that she could somehow be her successor. The Superman of Earth-1 and the Thunderbolt conceived a solution and transferred Dinah's memories into her daughter's body so that she could continue fighting as the Black Canary.

A Black Canary miniseries by writer Greg Weisman and artist Mike Sekowsky was planned in 1984. Although its first issue was pencilled, the project was shelved due to the character's use in writer-artist Mike Grell's high-profile Green Arrow: The Longbow Hunters series. Elements of the project were used in Weisman's short film, DC Showcase: Green Arrow.

When DC rebooted its continuity with The New 52, the character was amalgamated with Dinah Laurel Lance, and took the name Dinah Drake. The Golden Age Black Canary was restored to continuity in the lead-up to DC's Infinite Frontier initiative.

==== Origin ====
Dinah was born to Richard Drake, an Irish detective in Gotham City, and an unnamed mother who died the early years of her marriage to Richard. This occurred in the early-to-mid 1900s, a time before corruption was deeply rooted in the city. Richard trained Dinah from a young age, hoping that she would follow in his footsteps and become a policewoman. They both aspired to combat the growing corruption and seek justice for Richard's late wife. In her later years, Dinah developed a connection with Larry Lance, her father's younger partner. She aimed to join the police academy, with the intention of helping her father and Larry in their efforts. However, despite her contributions, her application to the GCPD Police Academy was rejected. Both Dinah and Larry became disillusioned with the department. Richard suspected misogyny and was angered by the proposal of an administrative job for Dinah, feeling that the department did not want another honest member of their family in law enforcement. Richard died due to a heart attack. Inspired by the actions of "mystery men," Dinah decided to adopt the persona of the vigilante known as "Black Canary." Initially, she trusted no one and assumed the guise of a criminal, targeting other criminals. In her civilian life, she pursued a career as a florist, seemingly abandoning her earlier desire to work in law enforcement.

==== Earlier exploits as Black Canary ====
In her early appearances, Black Canary made her initial debut as a supposed villain in the presence of hero Johnny Thunder. Johnny becomes immediately infatuated with her, much to the disapproval of his Thunderbolt companion. However, it is later revealed that Dinah had actually infiltrated a criminal gang, shedding light on her true intentions. In her own anthology feature, the character is portrayed as a black-haired florist who harbors romantic feelings for Larry Lance, a detective with the Gotham City Police Department. Eventually, she would meet the Justice Society of America and joined them among her ranks. As a hero, her foes included the criminal circus act Carno and His Masked Riders, and the Sacred Order of the Crimson Crystal.

Black Canary was revived with the other Golden Age characters during the 1960s. In these stories, it is retroactively established she lives on the parallel world of Earth-2 (home of DC's Golden Age versions of its characters) in Ireland. Married to Larry Lance since the 1950s, Dinah participates in annual team-ups between the Justice Society and Earth-1's Justice League of America. In a 1969 JLA/JSA team-up against the rogue star-creature Aquarius, who banished Earth-2's inhabitants (except the JSA) to another dimension, Larry Lance is killed saving Dinah's life and Aquarius is defeated. Grief-stricken, Canary moves to Earth-1 and joins the Justice League. She begins a relationship with JLA colleague Green Arrow and discovers that she has developed an ultrasonic scream, the "canary cry."

A story in Justice League of America #219-220 (October and November 1983) served to explain the origin of Black Canary's new sonic scream powers, and further, why she continued to appear youthful despite being active since the late 1940s (thereby making her nearly 60 years old). It was established that during the 1950s, she and Larry had a daughter, Dinah Laurel Lance, who was cursed by the Wizard with a devastating sonic scream. Her mother hoped that Johnny Thunder's Thunderbolt could cure her, but the Thunderbolt was only able to keep the younger Dinah in suspended animation in his own dimension. To ease their pain, the Thunderbolt altered the memories of the tragedy, leaving all to believe Dinah's daughter had simply died. Following the battle with Aquarius, Dinah discovered she was dying from radiation exposure, and she asked to see her daughter's grave one last time. Shown the body of her daughter—still in suspended animation, but now grown to adulthood—Dinah wished that her daughter could somehow be her successor. The Superman of Earth-1 and the Thunderbolt conceived a solution and transferred Dinah's memories into her daughter's body so that she could continue fighting as the Black Canary.

==== Revised history and death ====
Following the events of Crisis on Infinite Earths, the character's history underwent significant changes. Eventually, Dinah and Larry Lance married once again and established a private law firm in Gotham City. They welcomed the birth of their daughter, Dinah Laurel Lance, who would later aspire to become a superhero. Dinah herself retired from her own heroic endeavors and focused on raising her daughter. The members of the Justice Society of America became like a second family to them. However, Dinah held a contrasting view when it came to her daughter's desire to become a hero. She vehemently opposed it, which led to arguments between them. It was during one of these arguments that young Dinah first manifested her metahuman ability known as the "Canary Cry." Despite their strained relationship, her daughter went on to become a hero as Black Canary within the Justice League.

Tragedy struck when Larry Lance was killed by an alien entity that targeted the older Dinah. This event caused Dinah to become bitter and she pleaded with her daughter to give up her life as a hero, fearing further loss. She contracted cancer from the same entity that claimed her husband's life, leading to her hospitalization. Before dying, Dinah apologized to her daughter for her actions, recognizing the similarities between them and reflecting on her own father. She acknowledged how alike they were and expressed remorse. In her final moments, she entrusted Green Arrow, her daughter's lover, with looking after her. As she departed from this world, Spectre, a teammate, escorted her into the afterlife, where she eagerly anticipated reuniting with her parents and husband once more.

==== New 52 and onward ====
During a certain period, the character's history was merged with that of her daughter, both assuming the name Dinah Drake. However, in preparation for DC's Infinite Frontier initiative, the original Golden Age Black Canary was reintroduced into continuity. In this new continuity, although similarities from her prior history are present, the identity of Dinah Drake II's father remains undisclosed, as the character Larry Lance was temporarily replaced by Kurt Lance during the amalgamation period before his history is retroactively added to Dinah Drake II's history. Due the alterations after the New 52, it was retconned that the composite Dinah's (now Dinah II) mother is retroactively Dinah Drake I.

In this history, originally depicted as a teenage mother, she found herself unable to adequately care for her daughter and made the difficult decision to abandon her at a young age. However, this truth remained unknown from the younger Dinah until a later point in her life, who instead believed she was abandoned. Further details emerged about the older Dinah's life as the first Black Canary. She was widely recognized as a highly skilled martial artist, and she partnered with her unnamed husband, who worked as a private investigator in Gotham. At one point, she even founded her own martial arts group. To protect her daughter, Dinah made the difficult decision to leave her behind and assumed various disguises, including working as a florist and a dancer. Tragedy struck when her husband was killed during a confrontation with their adversary, Ravanahatha. In response, Dinah unleashed her unique martial arts technique known as the "Five Heavens Palm," which proved instrumental in defeating the formidable demon. In a mysterious manner, she managed to pass down the knowledge of this technique to her daughter, which later became crucial when her daughter faced the same demon in battle.

=== Dinah Laurel Lance ===
Cover of Detective Comics #554 (September 1985); art by Klaus Janson, which homages Carmine Infantino's cover for Flash Comics #92 (February 1948).

Following the universe-altering events of Crisis on Infinite Earths (concluding in March 1986), Black Canary's history was revised again. The mind-transplant story of 1983 was discarded; in this version of the story, the present-day Black Canary is Dinah Laurel Lance, who inherits the identity from her mother, Dinah Drake Lance. Although some references (for example, those in James Robinson's Starman series) tried to distinguish the two Canaries by calling the first "Diana", recent accounts have confirmed Dinah as the mother's given name.

The two Canaries' origin stories were told in full in Secret Origins #50 (August 1990). In this story, Dinah Drake is trained by her Irish father, detective Richard Drake, intending to follow him on the Gotham City police force. When she is turned down, her disillusioned father dies shortly afterwards. Determined to honor his memory, Dinah fights crime and corruption by any possible means. She becomes a costumed vigilante, using her inheritance to open a flower shop as her day job. Dinah marries her lover, private eye Larry Lance, and several years later their daughter, Dinah Laurel Lance, is born (Birds of Prey #66 (June 2004) would establish that they took the name "Laurel" from a librarian Dinah befriended during a case).

The younger Dinah has her own "canary cry"—in this version, the result of a metagene absent from both her parents—which (unlike the Silver Age Black Canary) she can control. Growing up surrounded by her mother's friends in the disbanded JSA (seeing them as uncles and aunts), she wishes to be a costumed hero like her mother, but the elder Dinah discourages her, feeling that the world has become too dangerous for her daughter to succeed. Regardless, Dinah finds fighters (including former JSA member Wildcat) who help her hone her skills, and after years of dedication and training, she assumes the mantle of Black Canary despite her mother's opposition. Like her mother, Dinah operates out of Gotham, with a day job in the family floral business.

In an early Birds of Prey issue, writer Chuck Dixon has Dinah briefly married and divorced at a young age. Although ex-husband Craig Windrow seems to need her help, he actually wants to reconcile after he embezzles from the mob. Dinah's early marriage and ex-husband are not mentioned again until the 2007 Black Canary limited series.

After joining the Justice League, Dinah meets Green Arrow (Oliver Queen). Although she dislikes him at first, they become romantically involved despite their age difference; opposite the earlier depiction, in the Modern Age stories, Oliver is considerably older than Dinah. Dinah is a League member for about six years, including a brief stint with Justice League International (JLI, which she helps found). After her mother's death from radiation poisoning received during her battle with Aquarius, Dinah feels that her time in the JLA is over. She moves to Seattle with Green Arrow and opens a flower shop, Sherwood Florist.

When Dinah belonged to the JLI during the 1980s, she wore a new costume, a blue-and-black full-body jumpsuit with a bird motif and a slightly looser fit instead of her traditional, skin-tight black outfit with fishnet stockings. The change was poorly received and short-lived, and later artists restored her original look.

==== Birds of Prey ====
Dinah Laurel Lance as the modern iteration of Black Canary. Art by Jay Anacleto.

When former Batgirl Barbara Gordon is seriously injured by the Joker, she reestablishes her crime-fighting career as Oracle, information broker to the superhero community. After briefly working with the Suicide Squad, she forms a covert-mission team. Since Barbara thinks that of all the superheroes Dinah has the most potential, Oracle asks Black Canary to become an operative.

Black Canary reinvents herself, trading her blonde wig for bleached blonde hair. Her relationship with Oracle is rocky at first, since her impulsiveness clashes with Oracle's organization. Gradually, they learn to work together and became friends. When Oracle flees from Blockbuster, Dinah rescues her and meets Barbara Gordon, deepening their friendship.

Infinite Crisis gives Earth a new timeline, with Wonder Woman again a founding member of the Justice League. In a Week 51 back-up feature of 52, Black Canary is at the battle which forms the League. Its core is Black Canary, Green Lantern (Hal Jordan), the Martian Manhunter, the Flash (Barry Allen), Aquaman, Superman, Batman and Wonder Woman. In the 2007 Black Canary miniseries, she and Green Arrow join the Justice League after its founding and are tested by founding member Batman early in their membership.

During publication of the Infinite Crisis limited series, most DC Universe comic books advanced one year. After this "One Year Later" jump, Dinah trades life experiences with Lady Shiva to soften the warrior and begins a harsh training regimen in an unidentified Vietnamese shanty town. The regimen replicates Shiva's early life and training, and Shiva assumes Dinah's role in Oracle's group.

During Countdown, several series include tie-ins and run-ups to the wedding of Dinah and Ollie. The Black Canary Wedding Planner details the preparations; in Birds of Prey #109, Dinah and Barbara discuss the wedding (and Ollie). Countdown: Justice League Wedding Special, and Justice League #13 deal with the bachelor and bachelorette parties. A plot thread throughout is a plan by the Injustice League to attack the wedding.

Dinah resigns as JLA chairwoman after the team's confrontation with the Shadow Cabinet. After learning that Ollie began his own Justice League with Hal Jordan, she confronts him when he arrives at the Watchtower to warn her of an attack on the world's superheroes. Prometheus arrives and attacks the team, severing Red Arrow's arm and maneuvering Dinah into the path of an energy bolt fired by Mikaal Tomas. After Prometheus is defeated, he destroys Star City with a teleportation device. In their search for survivors, Dinah and Ollie discover the bloody body of Roy's daughter, Lian. Dinah goes to Roy's hospital bedside with Donna Troy to break the news about his daughter when he emerges from his coma.

In Blackest Night, Dinah travels to Coast City to fight Nekron's army of Black Lanterns. According to Nekron, he can control the heroes (including Ollie) who have died and been resurrected. Dinah fights her husband, now a Black Lantern, with Mia and Connor. Ollie regains control of his body long enough to miss his wife with a shot which severs a hose containing liquid nitrogen. Dinah orders Connor to use the hose on Ollie, freezing him solid, and the three join the rest of the heroes in battle.

When Ollie returns to normal, it is discovered that he secretly murdered Prometheus and left his body to rot at his headquarters. After Barry Allen and Hal Jordan confront Ollie and Dinah with the news, Ollie escapes. Dinah, Hal and Barry search the ruins of Star City for him, finding him looking for one of the men who worked for Prometheus. Ollie overpowers them, leaving Dinah in a restraining fluid. After Green Arrow surrenders for Prometheus' murder, Dinah visits him in jail and realizes that he wants to be left alone. She removes her wedding ring, leaving it with him, and does not attend his trial.

In Brightest Day, Dinah returns to Gotham in a relaunch of Birds of Prey with Gail Simone. In Birds of Prey #1 (July 2010), she is sent to save a child with Lady Blackhawk. After receiving a call from Oracle, the team (including Huntress) is reunited. They are confronted by a new villainess, White Canary, who has a grudge against Dinah and exposes her civilian identity. After capturing White Canary (the vengeful sister of the Twelve Brothers in Silk), Dinah learns that Lady Shiva is behind the attack on the Birds. Dinah and White Canary travel to Bangkok; when the Birds arrive a short time later, Dinah attacks them dressed as White Canary. Later, Dinah reveals that Sin and her foster parents are being held hostage, their lives threatened unless Dinah challenges Lady Shiva to a fight to the death. Huntress offers to take Dinah's place instead, reasoning that she has too many people who love her. However, this gives Dinah the opportunity to rescue Sin with the help of one of White Canary's students, Terry, and race back to halt the duel between Helena and Shiva. While the duel is understood to be a matter of duty and honor, Dinah brings to their attention that there was no time mentioned and for now the fight must end, and to be resumed at a later time. While White Canary is displeased, Shiva sides with Black Canary and the Birds and the fight is over.

==== Bloodspell ====
Although the Black Canary–Zatanna graphic novel Bloodspell, written by Paul Dini and drawn by Joe Quinones, was scheduled for a 2012 release, it was delayed until May 2014. The story centers around the meeting of 16-year-old Dinah and Zatanna.

==== New 52 onward ====
During DC's The New 52 era which began in 2011, Black Canary was portrayed as a single character with a metahuman Canary Cry resulting from government experiments. However, DC later began to row back on controversial New 52 continuity changes with its DC Rebirth initiative, with the narrator of Geoff Johns' DC Rebirth #1, Wally West lamenting, from outside the universe, on how Black Canary and Green Arrow hardly know each other any more, when they should be husband and wife, as a result of sinister alterations to the timeline. The comic shows the pair briefly meeting, by chance, and then separately staying up at night, contemplating what is missing from their lives. They meet again in Green Arrow Rebirth #1, and instantly hit it off. In the ensuing Green Arrow series, Dinah is the first to notice something awry with Oliver's apparent suicide (in fact, an attempted assassination by Shado) and disappearance. She is also a current member of the Birds of Prey, as well as the Justice League of America. In Birds of Prey: Rebirth, it is revealed that Dinah and Barbara (Batgirl) have been good friends for a few years now, while just meeting Helena Bertinelli (Huntress). In Justice League of America, she is seen fighting Caitlin Snow (Killer Frost), and is later recruited by Batman due to the skills she possesses.

Following subsequent continuity-restoring events in Doomsday Clock and Dark Nights: Death Metal, the current Black Canary is re-established as being the daughter of her Golden Age predecessor, fully reversing the controversial New 52 changes.

== Powers and abilities ==
=== Dinah Drake's skill and abilities ===
The original Black Canary character did not possess inherent superhuman powers but demonstrated exceptional martial arts skills and investigative abilities that were in line with those of law enforcement officers. She was proficient in various martial arts disciplines, such as Judo and a unique variation of chinese martial arts. Notably, she developed a technique called the "Five Heavens Palm," which was described as a method that harnessed a form of energy accessible to master martial artists (likely qi). The resulting attack was capable of inflicting damage on supernatural entities.

She wears a choker necklace with a locket that serves multiple purposes. When activated, the locket can release a small knife or a smoke pellet. Additionally, it contains various other items, including an expandable sticky web, sneezing powder, and a converging lens. She can also train black canaries to do tricks.

=== Dinah Laurel Lance's powers and abilities ===
The second Black Canary is proficient in covert operations, military operations, and investigation. She is also a high-level martial artist with knowledge and training in different martial art disciplines: Aikido, Boxing, Capoeira, Defendu, Hapkido, Judo, Jujutsu, Jeet Kune Do, Karate, Kickboxing, Kung Fu, Krav Maga, Muay Thai, Savate, Taekwondo, Shuri-te, Wing Chun, and can utilize the Five Heavens Palm & Pressure Point techniques. These abilities have positioned her as a leader within multiple superhero teams due to her tactical and strategic mind and abilities. She is also a musician and singer.

Unlike her predecessor, the second Black Canary is a metahuman who possesses a unique ability known as the Canary Cry. This power enables her to emit ultrasonic vibrations through a powerful scream, capable of causing destruction to objects in her vicinity. The Canary Cry has been portrayed as possessing tenfold the capabilities of typical sonic weapons, with the ability to break metals and generate enough resonance to impact and shatter the Earth. She can also glide and propel herself across long distances by screaming downwards.

== Other versions ==
- On Earth-3, an evil equivalent of Black Canary called White Cat is a member of the supervillain co-op called the Crime Society of America.
- A version of Black Canary from Earth 3 named Black Siren was introduced in the DC Comics canon in Crime Syndicate #2, as one of the villains controlled by Starro who eventually joined the Crime Syndicate. In Suicide Squad (vol. 7) #7, she became a member of Task Force X under the orders of Amanda Waller. Previously, the name Black Siren had been used for alternate-Earth versions of Black Canary appearing in the Justice Guild of America on Justice League and in the Arrowverse. Black Siren was also based on Scream Queen from Justice League: Crisis on Two Earths.
- In the Absolute Universe, Dinah Lance / Black Canary is an ex-policewoman and MMA fighter turned executive protection specialist, bodyguarding the elite to pay for her father's medical bills. In Absolute Green Arrow, Dinah is forced by Hector Hammond to investigate the Longbow Hunter, a masked killer targeting corrupt billionaires, who's also connected to Dinah ex-boyfriend Oliver Queen, who was recently murdered.

== In other media ==
The Black Canary has appeared in several adaptations of DC properties based on the comic books.

== Reception ==
The Black Canary is ranked the 71st-greatest comic book character of all time by Wizard, and IGN rated her its 81st-greatest all-time comic book hero. She was number 26 on Comics Buyer's Guide's "100 Sexiest Women in Comics" list.

== Music ==
In 2016, DC Comics released a three-track musical album called EP 1 to promote the comic book, in which the Black Canary becomes the lead singer of a band that shares her name. Caveboy lead singer Michelle Bensimon provided Dinah's singing voice. A follow-up three-track album called EP 2 followed in August 2017.

== See also ==
- Woman warrior
- List of Black Canary characters
