= List of Green Arrow supporting characters =

This is a list of Green Arrow supporting characters.

In chronological order with name, first appearance and description.

== Supporting characters ==
| Character | First appearance | Description |
|---|---|---|
| Batman | Detective Comics #27 (May 1939) | A similar crime fighter to Green Arrow where the archer borrowed a number of his applications to the Dark Knight. The pair would serve together in the JLA and the Outsiders. |
| Hawkman | Flash Comics #1 (January 1940) | Serving with Arrow on the JLA, the pair frequently argued over ideology. |
| Roy Harper | More Fun Comics #73 (November 1941) | Green Arrow's adopted son, sidekick, partner, and best friend. Harper began his heroic career as Speedy and later as Arsenal. Also for at time took on the identity as Red Arrow. |
| Seven Soldiers of Victory | Leading Comics #1 (Winter 1941) | Pre-Crisis, Green Arrow and Speedy were founding members. Post-Crisis, the pair would be replaced by Alias the Spider and Wing. |
| Scarlet Bowmen | Adventure Comics #226 (July 1956) | Peter and Albert Regal, heroes of the country of Belgravia, are jailed by a corrupt official and Green Arrow and Speedy must masquerade as them in their absence. |
| Grandpa, Pearly, and Zeb Queen | Adventure Comics #228 (September 1956) | Distant relatives of Oliver Queen living in Tennessee. |
| Green Arrow Fan Club | Adventure Comics #231 (December 1956) | A group of youths that idolize Green Arrow and sometimes become involved in his cases. Notable members include Terry Burns and Jimmy. |
| Queen Arrow | Adventure Comics #241 (October 1957) | Diana Dare, the daughter of millionaire Everet Dare, sleepwalks under the influence of a potion as a heroine modeled after Green Arrow. |
| The International Delegation of Masked Archers | Adventure Comics vol. 1, #250 (July 1958) | A group of archers that fight crime from around the world. |
| Xeen Arrow | Adventure Comics #253 (October 1958) | A resident of Dimension Zero, Xeen Arrow was a scientist that took on a role in his universe similarly to Green Arrow. |
| Green Error | World's Finest Comics #100 (March 1959) | A clown that parodies Green Arrow at a carnival complete with an Errorcar and joke arrows. |
| Arrows of Alaska | Adventure Comics #260 (May 1959) | Green Arrow trains Jerry Halleck, a classmate of Roy Harper, so he can return to his father Ed and the pair can fight crime as duo. |
| Brave Bow | Adventure Comics' #262 (July 1959) | A Sioux chief that would raise Roy Harper, son of a forest ranger that died. Reaching old age, Bow sends Harper to seek Green Arrow out to become his ward. |
| Green Lantern (Hal Jordan) | Showcase #22 (October 1959) | When Arrow called Jordan on losing touch with humanity, the pair went a trip across the US and they became best friends. |
| Justice League of America | The Brave and the Bold #28 (February/March 1960) | The foremost heroic group of the modern age of heroes, Green Arrow would join the group as the first new member after their formation. Connor Hawke would later join the group after taking up his father's mantle. |
| Arrowette | World's Finest Comics #113 (November 1960) | Inspired by Green Arrow, Arrowette tried to act as the hero's partner but instead fumbled in her attempts. She would later date the hero in their civilian identities. King would take on reporter Bernell Jones as her sidekick Bowstring, the two would later marry and produce daughter Cissie. |
| Funny-Arrow | World's Finest Comics #138 (December 1963) | A clown that parodies Green Arrow for a circus. He would later try his hand at being a hero before being impersonated in crimes. |
| The Question | Blue Beetle (vol. 5) #1 (June 1967) | Partnered with Green Arrow at times. Most notably in a team-up with them both, Batman and John Butcher in The Brave and the Bold. Also, opposed Green Arrow in Batman: The Dark Knight Strikes Again. |
| Black Canary | Justice League of America #75 (November 1969) | Serving together on the JLA, Arrow and Canary have a long time on-and-off romantic relationship, at one time being married. In the New 52 continuity, they did not meet until the DC Rebirth event. |
| Appa Ali Apsa | Green Lantern (vol. 2) #76 (April 1970) | Member of the Guardians of the Universe, Apsa was chosen by his peers to accompany Hal Jordan and Green Arrow on their trip across America. |
| Jack Major | Green Lantern (vol. 2) #87 (December 1971-January 1972) | Mayor of Star City that coaxed Green Arrow into running for office that the hero later learns was in league with the crime lord Thaddeus Cable. |
| Great Frog | Action Comics #436 (June 1974) | Roy Harper's band that he played drums for. |
| Danny Harris | Action Comics #456 (February 1976) | A comedian kidnapped by Lex Luthor for ransom before being saved by Green Arrow and Black Canary. |
| Mack Morgan | World's Finest Comics #247 (October–November 1977) | A detective for the Star City police that provides information to Green Arrow. |
| Ruth Anderson | World's Finest Comics #248 (December 1977-January 1978) | Dinah Lance's friend in the fashion industry. |
| Onyx | Detective Comics #546 (January 1985) | Formerly a member of the League of Assassins, Onyx forsook that life and joined the same Ashram Monastery that Green Arrow once belonged to. When the order's master was killed, Onyx sought Arrow to take down his killer. She later came to Star City seeking that same killer again. |
| Champion | Detective Comics #560 (March 1986) | A paid protector that Green Arrow learned would create dangerous situations to drum up business. |
| Thomas Bolt | Detective Comics #560 (March 1986) | Mayor of Star City that was also the crime boss Steelclaw in order to control crime in the city. |
| Lian Harper | New Teen Titans (vol. 2) #21 (June 1986) | The daughter of Roy Harper and Cheshire. Lian was murdered by Prometheus. |
| James Cameron | Green Arrow: The Longbow Hunters #1 (August 1987) | A lieutenant in the Seattle police department, Cameron did not support the phenomenon of costumed heroes becoming involved with police work. |
| Shado | Green Arrow: The Longbow Hunters #1 (August 1987) | An adversary of Arrow that would temporarily become an ally. She raped him while he was wounded and hallucinating and bear him a son named Robert. Queen wouldn't discover this had happened for several years and has had no role in his son's life. |
| Eddie Fyers | Green Arrow: The Longbow Hunters #3 (October 1987) | A former CIA operative that became a mercenary, hired to kill Shado. However, he would abandon the assignment and eventually become an ally to Queen. Fyers would become a father-figure to Connor Hawke after his father's demise, promising Queen earlier to look after Hawke if such a scenario played out. |
| Anne Green | Green Arrow (vol. 2) #1 (February 1988) | A psychiatrist that counseled Oliver Queen and Dinah Lance. |
| Colin | Green Arrow (vol. 2) #5 (June 1988) | A teenager that worked at Sherwood Florist, he is exposed as a member of the Warhogs street gang who under the orders of sub-boss Kebo attacked and, in some cases, murdered homosexual men. |
| Marianne | Green Arrow (vol. 2) #36 (September 1990) | Dinah Lance's assistant and driver for Sherwood Florist after being saved by and befriending Green Arrow, Marianne would steal a kiss from Queen one New Year's Eve, confessing her love for him and becoming the catalyst for the separation between Queen and Lance when the heroine witnessed the event. The heroic pair wouldn't become an item again until after Queen returned to life. |
| Green Lantern (Kyle Rayner) | Green Lantern (vol. 3) #48 (January 1994) | One of Connor Hawke's best friends carrying on the tradition made by Hal Jordan and Oliver Queen. |
| Connor Hawke | Green Arrow (vol. 2) #0 (October 1994) | The son of Oliver Queen and Moonday Hawke, Connor picked up his father's mantle for a time as Green Arrow. |
| Stanley Dover, Sr. | Green Arrow (vol. 3) #1 (April 2001) | A seemingly kindly, wealthy philanthropist that discovered a reborn Oliver Queen and offered him assistance in his mission as Green Arrow. However, Dover was in reality a demon-worshiper known to the public as the Star City Slayer that sought Queen's soulless body as a new vessel for himself. When Queen's soul returned to his body and a demon Dover summoned turned on the elder, killing him, the Emerald Archer inherited his wealth (as Dover believed he would have switched bodies). |
| Speedy | Green Arrow (vol. 3) #2 (May 2001) | An underage prostitute, Arrow saved and made Mia Dearden his ward. She would later become his sidekick, despite his objections. In the New 52 continuity, Mia is only a civilian, who was briefly involved with Team Arrow at one point because her father was hunting her. |
| Manitou Dawn | 'JLA #75 (January 2003) | The wife of Manitou Raven that carried on an affair with Green Arrow while he was part of the Justice League Elite. |
| Joanna Pierce | Green Arrow (vol. 3) #26 (July 2003) | The niece of Jefferson Pierce, Joanna was a lawyer for the Lamb Valley Tenants Association who had an affair with Oliver Queen. She was later killed by Constantine Drakon. |
| Justice League Elite | JLA #100 (August 2004) | A group formed out of the JLA with members of the Elite that would attempt to stop threats before they surfaced in a more proactive stance. Green Arrow was a founding member. |
| Brick | Green Arrow (vol. 3) #40 (September 2004) | A crime boss in Star City and a nemesis for Green Arrow, after Doctor Light and Merlyn destroyed most of Star City, Brick became an anti-hero and sometimes ally to Arrow in the remnants of the city. |
| Frederick Tuckman | Green Arrow (vol. 3) #60 (May 2006) | Oliver Queen's assistant while he was mayor (who also handled his mayoral campaign), Tuckman would take over as mayor of Star City when Queen stepped down. |
| Sin | Birds of Prey #92 (May 2006) | The adopted daughter of Green Arrow and Black Canary. |
| Natas | Green Arrow (vol. 3) #66 (November 2006) | An exceptional assassin that once trained Deathstroke, Natas was hired by Oliver Queen to train him to become more effective. He would employ information from Natas to steal billions from corrupt companies to finance a mayoral campaign. |
| The Outsiders | Batman and the Outsiders (vol. 2) #1 (December 2007) | A group of covert operatives employed by Batman to investigate and oppose threats before they surface. Green Arrow would join shortly after the group's reformation under the Dark Knight. |
| Naomi Singh | Green Arrow (vol. 5) #1 (September 2011) | Part of Green Arrow's crew in the New 52 continuity who works as a computer expert. She has not been seen after Issue 40. |
| "Jax" Jackson | Green Arrow (vol. 5) #1 (September 2011) | First name unknown, part of Green Arrow's crew in the New 52 continuity who designs the weapons that are part of Green Arrow's trick arrows. Later murdered by Komodo in Issue #18 (March 2013) |
| Henry Fyff | Green Arrow (vol. 5) #18 (March 2013) | Formerly a member of Q-Core but was fired due to stalking Naomi whom he had feelings for. Following Komodo's attack, Oliver was forced to go to him for help. Joins Team Arrow, and replaces the late Jax as weapons designer. Left in Issue 35, but returns after issue 40. |
| Emiko "Emi" Queen | Green Arrow (vol. 5) #18 (March 2013) | Originally presented as Komodo's daughter before it was revealed that she is actually the illegitimate daughter of Robert Queen and Shado (which makes her Oliver's half-sister in the New 52 continuity). After learning her origin, joins Team Arrow and turns against her mother. During the fifteenth issue of the Green Arrow series in the DC Rebirth event, officially takes on the code-name of Red Arrow. As Red Arrow, Emiko currently serves as a member for both Team Arrow and the Teen Titans. |
| John Diggle | Green Arrow (vol. 5) #24 (October 2013) | Based on the character of the same name from the Arrow television series. John Diggle is an old friend of Oliver and his original partner who later joins Team Arrow. Disappears after Issue 40. In DC Rebirth, it is revealed he left due to a falling out with Oliver, but later re-joins Team Arrow. |
| Felicity Smoak | Green Arrow (vol. 5) #35 (October 2014) | Felicity Smoak is a pre-existing character who incorporates elements from the character's Arrowverse counterpart, becoming a supporting character of Green Arrow. |

== Central rogues' gallery ==
| Villain | First Appearance | Description |
|---|---|---|
| Brick | Green Arrow (vol. 3) #40 (September 2004) | Brick (Daniel Brickwell) has flesh made of stone and became the crime lord of Star City and Green Arrow's nemesis. |
| China White | Green Arrow: Year One #3 (October 2007) | In the pre-Flashpoint DC Universe continuity, China White was responsible for stranding Oliver Queen on the deserted island which eventually forged him into the vigilante hero known as Green Arrow. |
| Clock King | World's Finest Comics #111 (August 1960) | William Tockman committed crimes with clocks as a theme under the guise of the Clock King, becoming one of Arrow's frequent sparring partners until he began to tangle with the Dark Knight. Was caught by the Green Arrow when robbing a bank in order to secure his sister's financial future, when informed falsely of his impending death; when she died while he was imprisoned, and he discovered the information regarding his demise was false, Tockman sought revenge on Green Arrow. |
| Constantine Drakon | Green Arrow (vol. 3) #27 (2003) | One of the best martial artists of today, Drakon was so fast that fans speculated he may be metahuman. An assassin/mercenary, Drakon seemingly only met defeat at the hands of Green Arrow which has made the hero someone of interest to the villain. |
| Count Vertigo | World's Finest Comics #251 (July 1978) | Suffering an inner ear defect, Count Werner Vertigo was outfitted with an electronic device to live a normal life but discovered that he could alter people's sense of balance after he was implanted. Vertigo became Arrow's nemesis but has seemingly reformed under the direction of Amanda Waller. |
| Cupid | Green Arrow/Black Canary #15 (February 2009) | Villainess obsessed with Green Arrow and began slaying his enemies. |
| Deathstroke | The New Teen Titans #2 (December 1980) | Generally a Teen Titans foe, Deathstroke fought Arrow during the events of Identity Crisis where the hero stabbed him in the eye with an arrow. Since then, Deathstroke has targeted the Emerald Archer. |
| Everyman | 52 #21 (September 2006) | Part of Lex Luthor's Everyman Project, Hannibal Bates was given the ability to eat living matter and almost perfectly replicate whom it belongs to. He took the place of Oliver Queen on his wedding night with Black Canary but when he tried to kill her due to his impotency, she instead took his life. However, he survived believing himself to still be Oliver Queen and joined with Cupid as the next Dark Arrow. |
| Komodo | Green Arrow (vol. 5) #17 (April 2013) | Simon Lacroix, the man who became Komodo, was once the protege of Robert Queen, the father of Oliver Queen. Lacroix was a part of Robert's expedition to find the Arrow totem that was said to bring enlightenment. Simon betrayed Robert and murdered him, seeking enlightenment for himself. In the end he did not find the totem. Lacroix then became the masked archer Komodo, as he strove to destroy Oliver Queen and Green Arrow in order to find the Arrow totem and to reach the enlightenment he so dearly craved. |
| Merlyn | Justice League of America #94 (1971) | A young Oliver Queen idolized the archery skill of Merlyn (Arthur King/Malcolm Merlyn) which helped inspire him to the bow. Years later, Merlyn became a mercenary for the League of Assassins and became the archenemy of Green Arrow. Tommy Merlyn and John King are separate characters based on the original Merlyn. |
| Onomatopoeia | Green Arrow (vol. 3) #12 (March 2002) | Making sport of slaying costumed heroes, the enigmatic Onomatopoeia tried to kill the Arrow family. |
| Prometheus | New Year's Evil: Prometheus #12 (February 1998) | The unnamed version is an enemy of the Justice League, the decimator of Star City, responsible for numerous deaths, including that of Lian Harper. Although he appeared to be killed by Green Arrow, he emerged again to oppose Midnighter. His successor, Chad Graham, was also almost killed by Queen. |
| Ra's al Ghul | Batman #232 (June 1971) | The leader of the League of Assassins, stories often involve him with the Lazarus Pits, which restore life to the dying. The Lazarus Pits have considerably prolonged Ra's' life, making him particularly dangerous as he has honed his combat skills for centuries. Though he comes into conflict with Batman, he and his organization has also come into with Green Arrow. |
| Richard Dragon | Green Arrow (vol. 5) #23 (October 2013) | As a boy, Ricardo Diaz, Jr. saw his father and namesake ruined and beaten by the Green Arrow. Taking the name of his former master, "Richard Dragon" has trained over years to become a master martial artist with one goal: to avenge his father. |

== Alternate realities ==
- Olivia Queen: Biological daughter of Oliver and Dinah Queen introduced in Kingdom Come #2 (June 1996).

== In other media ==
- In the TV series Smallville, Green Arrow would become one of Clark Kent's best friends, forming the Justice League and inspiring Kent towards his future as Superman. Arrow would eventually marry Chloe Sullivan.
- As a member of Justice League Unlimited, Green Arrow became close friends with Supergirl.
- In Batman: The Brave and the Bold, Green Arrow would become Batman's chief rival in the super hero community. He would eventually date Black Canary despite her initial crush with the Dark Knight.
- For Young Justice, Arrow takes on Artemis as his sidekick when Speedy ended their partnership.
- In the CW series Arrow, which debuted in 2012, Green Arrow works with a team of vigilantes. The team originates with Green Arrow, John Diggle and Felcity Smoak, and incorporates at various points over the series run Roy Harper/Arsenal, Sara Lance/White Canary, Thea Queen/Speedy, Laurel Lance/Black Canary, Curtis Holt/Mister Terrific, Rene Ramirez/Wild Dog, Rory Regan/Ragman, Evelyn Sharp/Artemis and Dinah Drake/Black Canary. His son William Clayton is also introduced. Green Arrow goes on to marry Felicity Smoak, and the pair have a daughter, Mia Smoak/Blackstar. The series originated the Arrowverse franchise, which sees Green Arrow working with other heroes including Barry Allen/The Flash and Kara Zor-El/Supergirl.

== See also ==
- List of Green Arrow enemies
- List of Batman supporting characters
- List of Superman supporting characters
- List of Wonder Woman supporting characters
- List of Green Lantern supporting characters
- List of Aquaman supporting characters
