= Natas (character) =

Publication information
- Publisher: DC Comics
- First appearance: Green Arrow (vol. 3) #66 (November 2006)
- Created by: Judd Winick

In-story information
- Species: Human
- Abilities: Master martial artist highly skilled assassin

Natas is a fictional character in the DC Universe. He is a martial arts master who first appeared in Green Arrow comics. In keeping with his ultimate betrayal of Green Arrow, his name is an anadrome of "Satan".

== Fictional character biography ==
After Oliver Queen, the original Green Arrow, was bleeding nearly to death in the ruins of Star City (victim of a sneak attack by Merlyn the Dark Archer), Ollie, Connor Hawke, and Mia Dearden spent months training from some of the greatest fighters in the DC Universe including Natas.

To that end, Natas spends weeks beating him silly, attacking and trying to kill him, and always fighting dirty (Mia compared it to the scenes in the Pink Panther when Inspector Clouseau is attacked by Cato, except less amusing). Natas puts Ollie through a brutal trial of martial combat. Over the course of many nights, Ollie hones his body to perfection and transforms himself into a living weapon.

Later, Frederick Tuckman tells Ollie about all of the things taking place in Star City. He tells him that a quarter of the city has been turned into a ghetto and that city officials have cordoned off trouble areas by erecting a large wall.

Ollie uses Natas' resources to play the stock market, robbing several disreputable corporations of over a billion dollars. He decides that when he returns to Star City, he is going to use the money to place himself into the political sphere of influence.

Natas says goodbye to Oliver, and leaves a note behind for him, the note reading "I have sent an army to kill you". Ollie calls Connor and Mia to attention and tells them to prepare for a fight.

Natas leaves Oliver Queen and his friends with a parting gift – a squadron of some of the world's deadliest assassins – and they have all been assigned to kill him. Ollie brings all of his allied masters together inside of a cave. Before they can realize what he is doing, Ollie sets off a detonator, which seals the cave. He doesn't want to place Connor or Mia into a situation where they might have to question their principles. Ollie runs off into the night to greet his attackers.

For the next two hours, Ollie races about the island playing cat and mouse games with the hired killers. He baits several of them into any number of a series of traps, and uses their own skills and insights against them. He corrals many of them to one side of the island, then sets off another explosive charge, blocking their escape route.

Ollie finally defeats enough of the hired guns that a stalemate is called. Connor and the others manage to free themselves from the cave, and apprehend the remaining killers.

Ollie is now prepared to return to Star City, partially encouraged by a second note Natas left that leaves him a sword to include as part of his arsenal (while also asking him to remove the hat from his costume). Connor however elects to stay behind. He feels that he has more to learn and wants to spend some time with Mia. Ollie and Frederick board a yacht and return to civilization.

Meanwhile, Constantine Drakon and Deathstroke murder two prison guards and escape from Alcatraz Island. Deathstroke radios his old master, Natas, and tells him that he is free. Natas responds by indicating that he is prepared for Deathstroke to teach his last student (Green Arrow) a lesson in failure.

== Other media ==
Natas appears as a bonus support card in Injustice: Gods Among Us.

== See also ==
- Oliver Queen (Green Arrow)
- Deathstroke
