= Connor Hawke (disambiguation) =

Connor Hawke is a DC Comics superhero.

Connor Hawke may also refer to:

- Connor Hawke (Arrowverse Earth-1), the version of the character from Arrow
- Connor Hawke (Arrowverse Earth-16), the version of the character from Legends of Tomorrow
