= Absolute Green Arrow =

Comic book series by DC Comics

- Textless cover of Absolute Green Arrow #1, art by Rafael Albuquerque

Publication information
- Publisher: DC Comics
- Schedule: Monthly
- Genre: Superhero
- Publication date: May 20, 2026 – present
- No. of issues: 12
- Main character(s): Dinah Lance; Green Arrow

Creative team
- Written by: Pornsak Pichetshote
- Artist: Rafael Albuquerque
- Letterer: Jeff Powell
- Colorist: Marcelo Maiolo
- Editor: Chris Conroy

Absolute Green Arrow is a superhero comic book miniseries published by DC Comics, based on Green Arrow. The series is written by Pornsak Pichetshote with art by Rafael Albuquerque, and began publication on May 20, 2026.

Absolute Green Arrow is the seventh series in the Absolute Universe, and the first of the third release wave, alongside Absolute Catwoman.

== Premise ==
Oliver Queen was killed by Hawkman for attempting to go against the Justice League, and soon after, uniquely connected billionaire associates of his are murdered, left with green arrows protruding out of their bodies.

Executive protection specialist Dinah Lance is assigned to uncover the mysterious archer-serial-killer’s identity and hunt him down.

== Publication history ==
Absolute Green Arrow was announced on July 24, 2025, at San Diego Comic-Con. Additional details were announced on February 18, 2026, along with the Absolute Catwoman series, providing more information about the plot and creative teams of both series, as well as their release dates.

On April 21, 2026, Pornsak Pichetshote stated that he was inspired to write Absolute Green Arrow as a serial killer hunting corrupt billionaires, framing it as "I Know What You Did Last Summer for billionaires."

The first issue of the series was published in the United States on May 20, 2026, with variant covers by Gerald Parel, Guillem March, Tula Lotay, Rafael Albuquerque, Ivan Tao, Reiko Murakami, Francesco Tomaselli, Ivan Talavera, Dexter Soy, Dave Wilkins, Ryan Benjamin, Björn Barends, Javier Fernández, John Giang, Rachta Lin, Alan Quah, Sanford Greene, and Tyler Kirkham.

On July 15, 2026, Pichetshote announced that Absolute Green Arrow had been extended from its original six issues to twelve issues.

== Plot ==
=== "The Longbow Killer" (#1-6) ===
Following the assassination of socialite Oliver "Ollie" Queen by Carter Hall on the orders of the Justice League, a secret organization of influential villains that includes billionaire Hector Hammond, (Note: As depicted in the one-shot comic Absolute Evil #1 (2025)) several corrupt billionaires throughout Star City are murdered by a masked archer known as the Green Arrow Killer, who leaves his victims riddled with poisoned green arrows. Among them is Jubal Slade, Ollie's former business partner and co-founder of the financial trading company GreenArrows, who had been accused of sexual assault and suspected of trafficking minors to his private island. Dinah Lance, a former police officer and mixed martial artist turned professional bodyguard who previously dated Ollie, is approached by Malcolm Merlyn, Hammond's head of security. Believing that Hammond and his CEO Reese Tyler are the killer's next targets, Merlyn recruits Dinah to protect them and investigate the murders, citing her law enforcement experience and connections to Ollie and Slade. Dinah initially refuses, but Hammond coerces her into accepting by threatening her ailing father's medical coverage. Suspecting a connection to Ollie, whose company's logo resembles the killer's arrows, Dinah accompanies Hammond, Tyler, and Merlyn to investigate his secret bunker. They are ambushed by the killer, who murders Tyler and several security personnel before severing Hammond's right hand and accusing him of involvement in Ollie's death. Dinah drives the vigilante away and searches the bunker with Merlyn, discovering the mutilated body of a young boy with numerous eyes embedded in his flesh.

As public support for the killer grows, Dinah investigates a list of suspects compiled by Merlyn. Equipped with Hammond's surveillance technology and an upgraded uniform designed to withstand the killer's arrows, she questions Mia Dearden, a former GreenArrows programmer and close friend of Ollie who severed ties with him after he failed to act on allegations against Slade. Mia reveals that Ollie had an estranged son, Connor Hawke, whom Dinah tracks to a seemingly abandoned mansion. During their confrontation, Connor mentions a mysterious substance called Miraclo, which he associates with Ollie's former business associates. They subsequently encounter the Green Arrow Killer murdering the property's new billionaire owner. Connor attempts to shoot the vigilante but is struck by a poisoned arrow and apparently dies in Dinah's arms. Dinah identifies the murdered owner as Edvin Zytle, an Eastern European nobleman, and learns that another suspect, Ollie's close friend and protégé Roy Harper, has been seen attempting to exhume his grave.

Merlyn and his security team lure the killer into an ambush, but he escapes through a prearranged route with the assistance of sympathetic civilians. Dinah identifies the boy discovered in Ollie's bunker as Guillermo Garcia, a runaway, before confronting Roy about his attempt to exhume Ollie's remains. Roy claims that Hammond stole the body and explains that Miraclo is an experimental substance capable of reversing aging and potentially resurrecting the dead, leading him to suspect that Ollie may have been revived. As Roy guides Dinah toward a secret laboratory, she discovers that Zytle was associated with Hammond. Flashbacks reveal that Ollie had been considering a presidential campaign and that Zytle had encouraged him to accept financial backing from his home country. His political ambitions had also brought him into contact with Hammond, whom he had been encouraged to cultivate as a potential ally. Upon entering the facility, Dinah and Roy discover evidence of human experimentation and encounter a monstrous test subject known as Solomon Grundy.

Dinah temporarily incapacitates Grundy but becomes separated from Roy while exploring the laboratory, where she discovers numerous failed experiments conducted by Hammond's scientist, Dr. Iker. Meanwhile, the Green Arrow Killer infiltrates the facility and uses Hammond's severed hand to access confidential files. Dinah finds Hammond and Iker torturing Tom Halloway, Ollie's former bodyguard and another suspect on Merlyn's list. Confronting Hammond at gunpoint, she deduces that Slade's supposed trafficking island was actually a secret laboratory used for Miraclo experiments on unwilling subjects and that Ollie had been investigating these activities before his death. Hammond admits that he obtained Ollie's corpse and attempted to resurrect him using Miraclo, believing him to be an ideal experimental subject. When the procedure failed, Hammond and Iker dissected his body for further research. After showing Dinah Ollie's mutilated remains, Hammond revives Grundy and orders him to attack her. The Green Arrow Killer intervenes, but Grundy overwhelms him and tears off his left hand.

Dinah and the injured vigilante are captured by Hammond. During their captivity, the killer reveals knowledge of Dinah's family, including allegations that her late mother had been involved with a drug cartel while serving as a police officer. Hammond unmasks the vigilante and discovers that he is Merlyn, who reveals that "Malcolm Merlyn" is an alias he adopted to infiltrate Hammond's organization. Merlyn explains that he belongs to a clandestine organization and was assigned to investigate the disappearance of Garcia, the nephew of one of his associates. His investigation uncovered Hammond's human experimentation, and Garcia's body was delivered to Ollie, who preserved the remains in his bunker as evidence against Hammond. Merlyn had sought Ollie's assistance in exposing the conspiracy, but his assassination prevented them from acting, prompting Merlyn to adopt Ollie's planned Green Arrow identity and target the corrupt billionaires involved. Hammond orders Grundy to kill Dinah and Merlyn, but Roy intervenes to rescue them, triggering another confrontation with the creature. Hammond also orders his security personnel to assassinate Dinah's father in retaliation for her interference. During the struggle, Merlyn sustains fatal injuries and dies, while Hammond escapes. Dinah subsequently discovers Roy unconscious beside another figure wearing the Green Arrow Killer's armor, leading her to realize that two individuals have been operating under the same identity.

The second Green Arrow Killer reveals himself to be Connor, who had been raised and trained by Merlyn as his protégé and regarded him as a surrogate father. Connor reveals that he delivered Garcia's body to Ollie and explains that he and Merlyn had intended to work with him to expose Hammond's conspiracy. Following Ollie's death, they assumed his planned Green Arrow identity and began assassinating those implicated in Hammond's operations. By alternating as the masked vigilante, they concealed their involvement, as the killer could appear while either Merlyn or Connor was visibly present. They also manipulated Dinah's investigation by staging Connor's apparent death and secretly monitoring Roy's communications. Meanwhile, Mia, who had been secretly working with Roy, thwarted Hammond's attempt to assassinate Dinah's father by disabling his communications.

Grundy attacks Dinah and Connor, but Dinah defeats him by firing a flaming arrow at a gas tank embedded in his body, causing an explosion. Dinah confronts Connor over his violent methods, but their argument is interrupted by Hammond's security forces. During the ensuing attack, she unexpectedly unleashes a powerful sonic scream that destroys the laboratory, killing Hammond's personnel and Dr. Iker and destroying the remaining experimental subjects, while Connor escapes. Dinah subsequently confronts Hammond at his residence with evidence of his crimes and offers to help secure witness protection if he exposes his fellow conspirators. Hammond refuses and is later found hanged in an apparent suicide, leaving behind a signed confession claiming sole responsibility for the human trafficking and experimentation. Dinah later reunites with Roy and Mia, and the three resolve to investigate the wider conspiracy, including allegations concerning Dinah's mother that Merlyn had alluded to before his death.

Meanwhile, Connor reflects on his and Merlyn's campaign against Hammond and recognizes that assassinating individual billionaires cannot eliminate the larger system of corruption. He resolves to continue operating as Green Arrow with a renewed purpose, seeking to inspire ordinary people to resist injustice rather than merely punish those responsible. The final scene reveals that Merlyn's real name was Arthur King and that he and Connor were affiliated with the Kobra cult, whose members are secretly monitoring Connor's activities.

== Collected editions ==
#	Title	Material collected	Format	Pages	Released	ISBN
1	The Longbow Killer	Absolute Evil #1 and Absolute Green Arrow #1–6	HC	200	February 23, 2027	978-1799517207
1	The Longbow Killer	Absolute Evil #1 and Absolute Green Arrow #1–6	TPB	200	February 23, 2027	978-1799517214

== See also ==
- Green Arrow: The Longbow Hunters, a prior limited series in which Green Arrow kills
