= Quiver (comics) =

Comic book by Kevin Smith

- Cover of Green Arrow, vol. 3, #1 (April 2001), art by Matt Wagner.
- Publisher: DC Comics
- Publication date: February – November 2001
- Genre: Superhero
- Title(s): Green Arrow (vol. 3) #1-10
- Main character(s): Green Arrow; Mia Dearden; Hal Jordan; Black Canary

Creative team
- Writer: Kevin Smith
- Penciller: Phil Hester
- Inker: Ande Parks
- Letterer: Sean Konot
- Colorist: Guy Major
- Green Arrow: Quiver: ISBN 1-56389-965-5

"Quiver" is a ten-issue Green Arrow story arc written by Kevin Smith with art by Phil Hester that ran between April 2001 and January 2002. Published by DC Comics, the arc appeared in Green Arrow (vol. 3) #1-10 and was edited by Bob Schreck.

== Plot summary ==
Hal Jordan, having become the Parallax, resurrects Green Arrow following his death in Green Arrow (vol. 2). However, he only has memories up to the events prior to The Longbow Hunters, with an examination of his body revealing that he is missing several old scars sustained after that point. As the resurrected Oliver Queen tries to figure out his place in the world, he interacts with important people from his past, including Black Canary, the Justice League, Batman, and Roy Harper. He also takes on a ward, Mia Dearden, who becomes the new Speedy. As it turns out, Green Arrow was revived in body but not soul; since Oliver Queen himself preferred to remain in Heaven but recognized his friend's need to bring something back, the body's memories stopping when they do because Queen felt that things went wrong for him after he took a life when he killed a rapist. This results in him being attacked by Etrigan the Demon due to his status as a 'hollow', a soulless being who demons can use to gain access to Earth. Jordan, as the Spectre, transports Oliver out of Etrigan's reach and brings him to Heaven to talk with his soul. However, when the soul prefers to remain in Heaven, Oliver is sent back and captured by Stanley Dover, a practitioner of the black arts who intends to transfer his soul into Oliver's body.

As Connor Hawke fights to save his father, Oliver makes contact with his soul while Dover attempts the ritual to take control of Oliver's body, convincing the soul to leave Heaven and rejoin with his body to save their son. With the two Green Arrows having fought off Dover's demons, they are saved by the Beast With No Name. The Beast devours Dover and leaves Oliver and Connor in Dover's house, revealing that Dover left everything to Oliver and encouraged him to use his resources to fight evil in Star City.

== Reception ==
"Quiver" received mostly positive reviews. Entertainment Weekly's Ken Tucker wrote: "The first issue pins you to the wall with artist Phil Hester's elegantly elongated figures and unpredictably shaped panels, while Smith succeeds in boiling down the Arrow mythos". Along with "Guardian Devil", "Quiver" helped to establish Kevin Smith as one of the most popular writers in comics.

"Quiver" was named as one of 2003's Best Books for Young Adults by the American Library Association's Young Adult Library Service.

== Collected editions ==
Quiver was collected into a hardcover (ISBN 1563898020) and trade paperback editions, Green Arrow: Quiver (ISBN 1563899655).
