= List of Green Arrow comics =

Green Arrow has been featured in many ongoing series, limited series and graphic novels published by DC Comics. These titles have been handled or coordinated through a single editorial section at DC Comics. This section also generally handles titles that have spun off of the core Green Arrow titles to feature related characters. This list presents these titles separated by general type of publication.

== Ongoing series ==
| Title | Issues | Initial cover date | Final cover date | Notes |
|---|---|---|---|---|
| Green Arrow volume 1 | #1 – 4 | May 1983 | August 1983 | |
| Green Arrow volume 2 | #1 – 137 | February 1988 | November 1998 | The run includes a #0 cover dated October 1994 and a #1,000,000 cover dated November 1998, and includes Annuals. |
| Green Arrow volume 3 | #1 – 75 | April 2001 | August 2007 | |
| Green Arrow and Black Canary | #1 – 29 | December 2007 | April 2010 | |
| Green Arrow volume 4 | #1 – 3 | April 2010 | June 2010 | |
| Green Arrow volume 5 | #1 – 15 | August 2010 | August 2011 | |
| Green Arrow volume 6 | #1 – 52 | September 2011 | July 2016 | The run includes a #0 cover dated November 2012, a #23.1 cover dated November 2013, and contains Annuals. |
| Green Arrow volume 7 | #1 – 50 | June 2016 | May 2019 | Published bi-monthly. |

== Annuals ==
| Title | Issues | Initial cover date | Final cover date | Notes |
|---|---|---|---|---|
| Green Arrow Annual | #1 – 7 | May 1988 | September 1995 | From mid-1988 through early 1995 Green Arrow Annual was published annually, with the exception of 1994. An additional annual was published in 2015. |

== Limited series ==
| Title | Issues | Initial cover date | Final cover date | Notes |
|---|---|---|---|---|
| Green Arrow | #1 – 4 | May 1983 | August 1983 | |
| Green Arrow: The Longbow Hunters | #1 – 3 | August 1987 | October 1987 | |
| Green Arrow: The Wonder Year | #1 – 4 | February 1993 | May 1993 | |
| Green Arrow: Year One | #1 – 6 | September 2007 | November 2007 | |
| Flashpoint: Green Arrow Industries | #1 | August 2011 | August 2011 | |

== One-shots and graphic novels ==
| Title | Cover date | Notes |
|---|---|---|
| Batman/Green Arrow: The Poison Tomorrow | 1992 | ISBN 978-0-930289-15-7 |
| Green Arrow Secret Files and Origins | December 2002 | |
| Green Arrow/Black Canary Wedding Special | November 2007 | |

== Collected editions ==
The trade paperback edition of The Archer's Quest (#16–21) was released as Volume 4 in the series after Straight Shooter (#26–31) was released as Volume 3. The hardcover editions of Quiver, The Sounds Of Violence, as well as The Archer's Quest were never numbered.

=== Beginnings and Team-Up with Green Lantern ===
| Title | Material collected | Publication date | ISBN |
|---|---|---|---|
| The Green Arrow by Jack Kirby | Stories from Adventure Comics #250–256, World's Finest Comics #96–99 | 2002 | |
| Showcase Presents: Green Arrow | Stories from Adventure Comics #250–266, #268–269; Brave and the Bold #50, #71, #85; Justice League of America #4, World's Finest Comics #95–140 | 2006 | SC: 978-1-4012-0785-4 |
| Green Lantern/Green Arrow, Vol. 1 | Stories from Green Lantern Vol. 2 #76–82 (per indicia, it actually #76-#81, #83). The 1992 edition is titled "Hard-Traveling Heroes". Strangely #82 wasn't reprinted in this collection but #83 was. Issue #82's cover is shown in the cover gallery. DC didn't correct this release at all. | May 1992 | SC: 1992 1-56389-038-0; SC: 2004 1-4012-0224-1 |
| Green Lantern/Green Arrow, Vol. 2 | Green Lantern Vol. 2 #84–87, #89; The Flash #217–219, #226 (only in the 2004 collections onwards) The 1993 edition is sub-titled "More Hard-Traveling Heroes". | 1993; 2004 | SC: 1993 1-56389-086-0; SC: 2004 978-1-4012-0230-9 |
| The Green Lantern/Green Arrow Collection | Stories from Green Lantern Vol. 2 #76–87, #89, The Flash #217–219 (did not include #226) This release was a slipcased hardcover. | 2001 | HC: 978-1-56389-639-2 |
| Green Arrow/Black Canary: For Better or for Worse | Stories from Justice League of America #75, backups from Action Comics #428 & 434, Joker #4, Green Lantern Vol. 2 #94-95, backup from Detective Comics #549-550, & excerpts from Green Arrow: Longbow Hunters #1, Green Arrow vol. 2 #75 & 101, & Green Arrow Vol. 3 #4-5, 12, & 21 | 2007 | SC: 978-1-4012-1446-3 |
| Green Arrow, Vol. 1: Hunters Moon | Stories from Green Arrow Vol. 2 #1-6 | 2014 | SC: 978-1-4012-4326-5 |
| Green Arrow, Vol. 2: Here There Be Dragons | Stories from Green Arrow Vol. 2 #7-12 | 2014 | SC: 978-1-4012-5133-8 |
| Green Arrow Vol. 3: The Trial of Oliver Queen | Stories from Green Arrow Vol. 2 #13-20 | 2015 | SC: 978-1-4012-5523-7 |
| Green Arrow Vol. 4: Blood of the Dragon | Stories from Green Arrow Vol. 2 #21-28 | 2016 | SC: 978-1-4012-5822-1 |
| Green Arrow Vol. 5: Black Arrow | Stories from Green Arrow Vol. 2 #29-38 | 2016 | SC: 978-1-4012-6079-8 |
| Green Arrow Vol. 6: Last Action Hero | Stories from Green Arrow Vol. 2 #39-50 | 2016 | SC: 978-1-4012-6457-4 |
| Green Arrow Vol. 7: Homecoming | Stories from Green Arrow Vol. 2 #51-62 | 2017 | SC: 978-1-4012-6574-8 |
| Green Arrow Vol. 8: The Hunt for the Red Dragon | Stories from Green Arrow Vol. 2 #63-72 | 2017 | SC: 978-1-4012-6903-6 |
| Green Arrow Vol. 9: Old Tricks | Stories from Green Arrow Vol. 2 #73-80, Green Arrow: The Wonder Year #1-4 | | SC: 978-1-4012-7531-0 |
| Green Lantern: Emerald Allies featuring Green Arrow | Stories from Green Arrow Vol. 2 #104, #110–111, #125–126; Green Lantern Vol. 3 #76–77, #92 | 1999 | SC: 978-1-56389-603-3 |
| Green Lantern: Emerald Knights featuring Green Arrow | Stories from Green Arrow Vol. 2 #136, Green Lantern Vol. 3 #99-106 | 1998 | SC: 978-1-56389-475-6 |

=== Green Arrow Return ===
| Title | Material collected | Publication date | ISBN |
|---|---|---|---|
| Green Arrow: Quiver | Stories from Green Arrow Vol. 3 #1–10 | 2002 | HC: 978-1-56389-802-0; SC: 978-1-56389-965-2 |
| Green Arrow: The Sounds of Violence | Stories from Green Arrow Vol. 3 #11–15 | 2003 | HC: 978-1-56389-976-8; SC: 978-1-4012-0045-9 |
| Green Arrow by Kevin Smith Deluxe Edition | Stories from Green Arrow Vol. 3 #1-15 | 2015 | HC: 978-1-4012-4596-2 |
| Green Arrow: The Archer's Quest | Stories from Green Arrow Vol. 3 #16–21 | 2004 | HC: 978-1-4012-0010-7; SC: 978-1-4012-0044-2 |
| Green Arrow: Straight Shooter | Stories from Green Arrow Vol. 3 #26–31 | 2004 | SC: 978-1-4012-0200-2 |
| Green Arrow: City Walls | Stories from Green Arrow Vol. 3 #32, #34–39 | 2005 | SC: 978-1-4012-0464-8 |
| Green Arrow: Moving Targets | Stories from Green Arrow Vol. 3 #40–50 | 2006 | SC: 978-1-4012-0930-8 |
| Green Arrow: Heading Into the Light | Stories from Green Arrow Vol. 3 #52, #54–59 | 2006 | SC: 978-1-4012-1094-6 |
| Green Arrow: Crawling From the Wreckage | Stories from Green Arrow Vol. 3 #60–65 | 2007 | SC: 978-1-4012-1232-2 |
| Green Arrow: Road to Jericho | Stories from Green Arrow Vol. 3 #66–75 | 2008 | SC: 978-1-4012-1508-8 |

=== Green Arrow/Black Canary ===
| Title | Material collected | Publication date | ISBN |
|---|---|---|---|
| Green Arrow/Black Canary: Road to the Altar | Stories from Birds of Prey #109, Black Canary #1–4: Black Canary Wedding Planner | 2008 | SC: 978-1-4012-1863-8 |
| Green Arrow/Black Canary: The Wedding Album | Stories from Green Arrow/Black Canary #1–5: Green Arrow/Black Canary Wedding Special | 2008 | HC: 978-1-4012-1841-6; SC: 978-1-4012-2219-2 |
| Green Arrow/Black Canary: Family Business | Stories from Green Arrow/Black Canary #6–10 | 2009 | SC: 978-1-4012-2016-7 |
| Green Arrow/Black Canary: A League of Their Own | Stories from Green Arrow/Black Canary #11–14, Green Arrow Secret Files #1 | 2009 | SC: 978-1-4012-2250-5 |
| Green Arrow/Black Canary: Enemies List | Stories from Green Arrow/Black Canary #15–20 | 2010 | SC: 978-1-4012-2498-1 |
| Green Arrow/Black Canary: Big Game | Stories from Green Arrow/Black Canary #21–26 | 2010 | SC: 978-1-4012-2709-8 |
| Green Arrow/Black Canary: Five Stages | Stories from Green Arrow/Black Canary #27–29, Green Arrow #30 | 2011 | SC: 978-1-4012-2898-9 |

=== Brightest Day ===
| Title | Material collected | Publication date | ISBN |
|---|---|---|---|
| Green Arrow: Into the Woods | Stories from Green Arrow Vol. 4 #1–7 | 2011 | HC: 1-4012-3073-3 |
| Green Arrow: Salvation | Stories from Green Arrow Vol. 4 #8–15 | 2012 | HC: 1-4012-3394-5 |

=== The New 52 ===
| Title | Material collected | Publication date | ISBN |
|---|---|---|---|
| Green Arrow, Vol. 1: The Midas Touch | Stories from Green Arrow Vol. 5 #1-6 | 2012 | SC: 978-1-4012-3486-7 |
| Green Arrow, Vol. 2: Triple Threat | Stories from Green Arrow Vol. 5 #7-13 | 2013 | SC: 978-1-4012-3842-1 |
| Green Arrow, Vol. 3: Harrow | Stories from Green Arrow Vol. 5 #0, 14–16, The Savage Hawkman #14, Justice League Vol. 2 #8 | 2013 | SC: 978-1-4012-4405-7 |
| Green Arrow, Vol. 4: The Kill Machine | Stories from Green Arrow Vol. 5 #17-24, 23.1: Count Vertigo | 2014 | SC: 978-1-4012-4690-7 |
| Green Arrow, Vol. 5: The Outsiders War | Stories from Green Arrow Vol. 5 #25-31 | 2014 | SC: 978-1-4012-5044-7 |
| Green Arrow, Vol. 6: Broken | Stories from Green Arrow Vol. 5 #32-34, Green Arrow: Futures End #1, Secret Origins Vol. 3 #4 | 2015 | SC: 978-1-4012-5474-2 |
| Green Arrow By Jeff Lemire & Andrea Sorrentino Deluxe Edition | Green Arrow Vol. 5 #17–34, 23.1: Count Vertigo, Green Arrow: Future's End #1, Secret Origins Vol. 3 #4 | 2016 | HC: ISBN 978-1-4012-5761-3 |
| Green Arrow, Vol. 7: Kingdom | Stories from Green Arrow Vol. 5 #35-40 | 2016 | SC: 978-1-4012-5762-0 |
| Green Arrow, Vol. 8: The Nightbirds | Stories from Green Arrow Vol. 5 #41-47, Green Arrow Annual #2, Convergence: Speed Force #2 | 2016 | SC: 978-1-4012-6255-6 |
| Green Arrow, Vol. 9: Outbreak | Stories from Green Arrow Vol. 5 #48-52, Green Arrow Annual #1 | 2016 | SC: 978-1-4012-7002-5 |

=== Rebirth ===
| Title | Material collected | Publication date | ISBN |
|---|---|---|---|
| Green Arrow Vol. 1: The Death and Life Of Oliver Queen | Stories from Green Arrow Vol. 6 #1-5, Green Arrow: Rebirth #1 | 2017 | SC: 978-1-4012-6781-0 |
| Green Arrow Vol. 2: Island of Scars | Stories from Green Arrow Vol. 6 #6-11 | 2017 | SC: 978-1-4012-7040-7 |
| Green Arrow Vol. 3: Emerald Outlaw | Stories from Green Arrow Vol. 6 #12-17 | 2017 | SC: 978-1-4012-7133-6 |
| Green Arrow Vol. 4: The Rise of Star City | Stories from Green Arrow Vol. 6 #18-25 | 2017 | SC: 978-1-4012-7454-2 |

=== Miscellaneous collections ===
| Title | Material collected | Publication date | ISBN |
|---|---|---|---|
| Green Arrow: Year One | Stories from Green Arrow: Year One #1–6 | 2008 | HC: 978-1-4012-1687-0; SC: 978-1-4012-1743-3 |
| Green Arrow: The Longbow Hunters | Stories from Green Arrow: The Longbow Hunters #1–3 | 1989 | SC: 978-0-930289-38-6 |
| Justice League: Rise and Fall | Stories from Justice League: Rise and Fall Special #1, Green Arrow #31–32, Rise of Arsenal #1–4, Justice League Vol. 2 #43 | | HC: 1-4012-3013-X |
