= Phil Hester (comics) =

Comic artist

- Hester at the GalaxyCon Des Moines in 2026
- Born: 1966 (age 59–60) Iowa, U.S.
- Areas: Artist, writer

Phil Hester (born 1966) is an American comic book artist, penciller and writer.

== Early life ==
Phil Hester is an alumnus of the University of Iowa.

== Career ==
Hester's pencilling credits include Swamp Thing, Brave New World, Flinch, Ultimate Marvel Team-Up, Clerks: The Lost Scene, The Crow: Waking Nightmares, The Wretch (nominated for the 1997 Eisner Award for Best New Series), Aliens: Purge, and Green Arrow.

During his run on Green Arrow, he created the characters Mia Dearden and Onomatopoeia with writer Kevin Smith as well as Constantine Drakon with writer Judd Winick.

Hester co-created Uncle Slam and Firedog with his Green Arrow collaborator, artist Ande Parks. He also created El Diablo, a new character (with a common name in DC Comics) who debuted in an eponymous limited series. His last comic 13 Steps was adapted in a Comedy Horror film.

Hester is currently writing the new adventures of Golden Age hero The Black Terror for Dynamite Entertainment, based on plot ideas by Alex Ross, as part of the Project Superpowers Universe.

He also wrote DC's Wonder Woman, based on the notes and outline by J. Michael Straczynski, after Straczynski left the title.

In December 2020 he was announced as the new artist on Superman, alongside writer Phillip Kennedy Johnson.

Known for his extensive collection of original comic art, he is the originator of the "Hester paradox", wherein a collection is so large that it is prohibitively expensive to insure and yet is too valuable not to insure.

== Bibliography ==
=== As writer ===
==== Aftershock Comics ====
- Stronghold #1-5

==== Boom! Studios ====
- The Anchor #1-8

==== DC Comics ====
- Future Quest Presents #5-7
- Gen 13 #35-39
- Titans: Titans Together #1-2, 4
- Wonder Woman (Vol. 3) #605–614
- Wonder Woman (Vol. 5) #750

==== Dynamite Comics ====
- Gold Key: Alliance #1-5
- The Bionic Man #1–10 (script by Phil Hester on the basis of Smith's unused The Six Million Dollar Man screenplay, art by Jonathan Lau, 2011–2012), #11-15

==== Image Comics ====
- Firebreather #1–4
- Golly! #1-5
- Guardians of the Globe:
  - Guarding the Globe vol. 2 #1–6 (written by Phil Hester, drawn by Todd Nauck, 2012–2013) collected as Guarding the Globe: Hard to Kill (tpb, 160 pages, 2013, ISBN 1-60706-673-4)
  - Invincible Universe (written by Phil Hester, drawn by Todd Nauck, 2013–2014) collected as:
    - On Deadly Ground (collects #1–6, tpb, 144 pages, 2013, ISBN 1-60706-820-6)
    - Above the Law (collects #7–12, tpb, 144 pages, 2014, ISBN 1-60706-986-5)
- Mythic #1-8
- The Atheist #1–4
- The Darkness (comics) (Vol. 3) #1-10, 75-88, 90-100
- The Darkness: Accursed #1-7

==== IDW Publishing ====
- Godzilla: Kingdom of Monsters #1–4
- T.H.U.N.D.E.R. Agents #1-8

==== Oni Press ====
- Deep Sleeper #1–4
- The Coffin #1–4

==== Other publishers ====
- Timecop (comics)
- Uncle Slam and Firedog
- Nails
- Oversight (anthology of many previously published short pieces)
- S.T.A.T (Security Through Acquired Talents)
- Teddy and the yeti

=== As artist ===
==== Aftershock Comics ====
- Artemis & the Assassin #1-5 (cover)
- Shipwreck #1–6 (with Warren Ellis, Aftershock, 2016–2018) collected as Shipwreck (tpb, 144 pages, 2018, ISBN 1-935002-80-5)

==== Dark Horse Comics ====
- Aliens: Purge #1

==== DC Comics ====
- Action Comics #1029
- Argus #1-4, 6
- Ape-ril Special #1, short story "Detour"
- Batman:
  - Batman Beyond (Vol. 7) #14-19
  - Batman Beyond Universe #13-14
  - Detective Comics (Vol. 1) #748-749
- Blue and Gold #7
- DC Holiday Special 2017 #1, short story "You Better Think Twice"
- El Diablo (pencils, with writer Jai Nitz and inks by Ande Parks, 6-issue limited series, September 2008)
- The Flash:
  - The Flash: Season Zero 1-8, 11-19, 21-22, 24
  - The Flash vol. 2 (Annual #6)
- Gotham City: Year One #1-6
- Green Arrow vol. 3 (with Kevin Smith, 2001–2002) collected as:
  - Quiver (collects #1–10, hc, 232 pages, 2002, ISBN 1-56389-802-0; tpb, 2003, ISBN 1-56389-965-5)
  - Sounds of Violence (collects #11–15, hc, 128 pages, 2003, ISBN 1-56389-976-0; tpb, 2004, ISBN 1-84023-759-7)
  - Green Arrow by Kevin Smith (collects #1–15, Absolute Edition, 384 pages, 2015, ISBN 1-4012-5548-5; tpb, 2016, ISBN 1-4012-6526-X)
- Green Arrow (Vol. 3) #16-22, 26-31, 34-45
- Green Arrow (Vol. 8) 5-6, 8, 11-16
- Justice League (Vol. 4) #66-67, 69-71
- Mother Panic #1-12
- Nightwing (Vol. 2) #107-116
- Red Hood & the Outlaws (Vol. 2) #25
- Showcase '95 #1-2
- Supernatural: Origins #1: "Speak No Evil" (with Geoff Johns, co-feature, Wildstorm, 2007) collected in Supernatural: Origins (tpb, 144 pages, 2008, ISBN 1-4012-1701-X)
- Swamp Thing (Vol. 2) #140-152, 154-155, 157-158, 160-171
- The Creeper #9-11
- Twisted Metal 2
- Young Monsters in Love #1

==== Marvel Comics ====
- Ant-Man:
  - Civil War: Choosing Sides: "Conscientous Objector" (with Robert Kirkman, anthology one-shot, 2006) collected in Civil War: Marvel Universe (tpb, 136 pages, 2007, ISBN 0-7851-2470-5)
  - The Irredeemable Ant-Man #1–12 (with Robert Kirkman and Cory Walker (#7–8), 2006–2007) collected as The Irredeemable Ant-Man (tpb, 272 pages, 2009, ISBN 0-7851-4086-7)
- Marvel Team-Up (Vol. 3) #15-25
- Namor, the Sub-Mariner Annual #1, short story "The Potsdam Objective"
- Ultimate Marvel Team-Up #2–3
- X-Man #7
- X-Men: The Early Years #16-17 (Cover Artist)

==== Dynamite Comics ====
- Green Hornet #1-6, 9-33

==== Image Comics ====
- Four Letter Worlds
- Family Tree #1-12
- The Holy Terror #1-2
  - Crossover #7 (with Chip Zdarsky, June 2021), #12 (ten-page segment featuring Negan and Kirkman himself, with Phil Hester, 2022) collected in Crossover: The Ten-Cent Plague (tpb, 176 pages, 2022, ISBN 1-5343-1928-X)

==== Other publishers ====
- Clerks: The Lost Scene (Oni Press)
- Rust vol.3 (Adventure)
- The Crow: Waking Nightmares #1-4 (Kitchen Sink Press)
- The Operation (with Warren Ellis, unproduced limited series intended for publication by Oni Press)
  - A short prelude story titled "Friday I'm in Love" was published in Oni Press Color Special '02 (anthology, 2002)
  - The production on the series was abandoned due to Hester reportedly overcommiting to various other projects.
- Negative Burn (Caliber):
  - "Positively Bridge Street" (with Alan Moore, in No. 11, 1994)
- Captain Ginger #1: "The Electric Sky Bear That Inspired Ben Franklin!" (two-page prose story with writing by Grant Morrison, 2018)
- City of Angels, #2–3, 3-issue mini-series, 1995, TPB, Titan Books, 1996, ISBN 1-85286-757-4

=== As writer and artist ===
- DC Nuclear Winter Special #1, short story "Northern Lights"
- G.I. Joe: A Real American Hero – Beach Head
- The Wretch #1-6
- The Nameless #1-5
- Xino #1, short story "She Took the Air"
