= China White (character) =

Publication information
- Publisher: DC Comics
- First appearance: Green Arrow: Year One #3 (October 2007)
- Created by: Andy Diggle (writer); Jock (artist)

In-story information
- Alter ego: Chien Na Wei
- Species: Human
- Notable aliases: Queen of the Pacific
- Abilities: Formidable martial artist Great assassin

China White (Chien Na Wei) is a supervillain appearing in American comic books published by DC Comics. She first appeared in Green Arrow: Year One (Oct. 2007), and was created by Andy Diggle and Jock. White was primarily an adversary of Green Arrow in his early years.

China White appeared as a recurring character on The CW Arrowverse series Arrow, portrayed by Kelly Hu.

== Fictional character biography ==
China White is the leader of a drug crime group that dominates the South Pacific. She supplies heroin imports for the West Coast United States, Australia, Japan, and the Pacific Rim from her base of operations on a volcanic island in Fiji. Many years ago, Oliver Queen was unknowingly manipulated into financing several of White's operations. When Queen's presence threatened to expose White, she ordered Hackett to kill him. Hackett beat up Queen and tossed him over the side of his boat, the Pacific Queen. Queen survived and discovered White's poppy fields, learning that she had been using local villagers as slave labor to sow the fields. When White discovered that Hackett had failed to kill Queen, she ordered him to finish the job or else he would be punished with slowly being killed by rats.

=== DC Rebirth ===
In the DC Rebirth relaunch, China White appears in New Super-Man #9, where she is established to be the leader of her own triad. She sends Strato the Cloud Man and Snakepit to attack LexCorp's research and development facility in order to claim artifacts which she believes were stolen from the East by Lex Luthor. White and her allies battle Luthor and Kong Kenan, the Super-Man of China, until they are interrupted by Superman.

== In other media ==
Kelly Hu as China White as she appears in Arrow.

- Chien Na Wei / China White appears in Arrow, portrayed by Kelly Hu. This version is an assassin-for-hire and a high-ranking member of a triad in Starling City. She later becomes the triad's leader following the death of her mentor Zhishan.
- Chien Na Wei appears in a self-titled issue of the Arrow tie-in comic. In flashbacks, she suffered childhood abuse from her father before he and Chien's mother were killed by Zhishan. However, a streak of Chien's hair turned white due to her fear of her father, which led to her being mocked by her peers and bleaching the rest of her hair with hydrogen peroxide to turn it completely white. She is later approached by Zhishan, who promised to make her stronger and more like him.
