= Constantine Drakon =

- Constantine Drakon as depicted on the cover of Green Arrow (vol. 3) #31 (December 2003). Art by Phil Hester.

Publication information
- Publisher: DC Comics
- First appearance: Green Arrow (vol. 3) #27 (August 2003)
- Created by: Judd Winick; Phil Hester

In-story information
- Species: Human
- Abilities: Master martial artist Enhanced physical attributes Use of firearms

Constantine Drakon is a fictional character in the DC Comics universe. He is a martial artist created by writer Judd Winick and artist Phil Hester. He is a villain and enemy of Green Arrow, and he first appeared in Green Arrow (vol. 3) #27 (2003).

The character appeared in the first episode of the TV series Arrow in 2012.

== Fictional character biography ==
=== Childhood ===
Constantine Drakon is a Greek assassin who was bullied as a child for his short stature. Once he started killing people at the age of ten, however, he found he was no longer sensitive about his stature. He claims that he had nothing strange or traumatic in his upbringing to turn him to murder, he was simply curious to see what he could do. Discovering that he was a prodigy at killing, Drakon makes a living out of it. He considers what he does not just a job but a vocation, and takes pride in the businesslike manner in which he operates.

=== Coming to Star City ===
Drakon not killing Green Arrow.

When troll-like monsters terrorize the Elevast Corporation's construction sites, the corporation hires Constantine Drakon to eliminate the monsters and cover up the link between them and the Elevast corporation. Oliver Queen's investigations into the monsters put him in direct confrontation with Drakon. In their first encounter, Drakon soundly defeats Green Arrow, killing a friend of Connor Hawke (Oliver Queen's son) and crucifying Green Arrow with his own arrows, choosing not to kill Green Arrow because he was not being paid enough to kill superheroes yet.

Drakon's next victim is attorney Joanna Pierce, niece of Black Lightning, who discovered information proving that the trolls were humans who had been transformed by a vaccine created by the Elevast Corporation. Drakon invades Green Arrow's household looking to take Pierce's evidence, but is thwarted by Connor Hawke.

== In other media ==
Constantine Drakon appears in the pilot episode of Arrow, portrayed by Darren Shahlavi. This version is Adam Hunt's head of security who is ultimately killed by Oliver Queen.
