= Speedy (Mia Dearden) =

DC Comics superheroine

- Mia Dearden as depicted in Justice League: Cry of Justice #7 (March 2010). Art by Ibraim Roberson.

Publication information
- Publisher: DC Comics
- First appearance: as Mia Dearden: Green Arrow (vol. 3) #2 (May 2001) as Speedy: Green Arrow (vol. 3) #45 (February 2005)
- Created by: Kevin Smith; Phil Hester

In-story information
- Alter ego: Mia Dearden
- Species: Human
- Team affiliations: Teen Titans; Team Arrow; Justice League
- Abilities: Expert archer and markswoman; Utilizes various compound bows and trick arrows; Skilled martial artist, acrobat, and swordswoman

Mia Dearden is a superheroine who appears in American comic books published by DC Comics, the second character to take up the mantle of Green Arrow's sidekick Speedy. Created by writer Kevin Smith and artist Phil Hester, she first appeared in Green Arrow (vol. 3) #2 (May 2001). She is one of the few HIV-positive characters in comic books.

Mia Dearden appeared in Smallville, portrayed by Elise Gatien. A loose adaptation, Thea Queen, appeared on the Arrowverse television series Arrow, portrayed by Willa Holland.

== Fictional character biography ==
Mia Dearden is a teenage runaway who was abused by her father. Unable to survive on her own, she fell in love with a man who offered her shelter and food in exchange for exploiting her in his child prostitution ring. Dearden was rescued from one of her clients, a depraved local politician, by the hero Green Arrow. Green Arrow sent her to see Oliver Queen (his real identity) for help, but upon meeting him, Dearden saw through Queen's disguise and recognized him as Green Arrow. She became his new ward; eventually, he came to see her as a daughter. Dearden continued to work with Queen, who began to train her as an archer. In addition, she trained with Oliver Queen's son Connor Hawke in martial arts and forged a close friendship with him. Dearden continually petitioned Green Arrow to allow her to serve as his sidekick, but Queen did not want to put another teenager at risk (having previously been the mentor of the first Speedy, Roy Harper).

As a result of the sexual exploitation she was subjected to prior to her rescue by Queen, Dearden is HIV-positive. After learning this, she redoubled her efforts to convince Green Arrow to let her become the new Speedy. After Green Arrow agreed and Dearden took up the mantle of Speedy, she joined the Teen Titans at the advice of Green Arrow. In order to earn her spot on the team, Cyborg had the new Speedy face off against Robin. Although Robin beat Speedy, Dearden proved herself to be a very skilled fighter and was accepted onto the team. Shortly after her first official mission with the Titans, she revealed to the team that she was HIV-positive. They accepted her without question or fear.

After the events of Infinite Crisis, Dearden recuperated from injuries on an island with Green Arrow and Connor, returning approximately a year later. During her time on the island, Mia trained in new styles of fighting and healing, and developed her teamwork with Green Arrow.

While searching the world alongside Black Canary and Green Arrow for Connor Hawke, who was kidnapped by the League of Assassins after an attack on Green Arrow, Dearden met and became attracted to a young British vigilante known as Dodger. Throughout the mission, Speedy and Dodger worked together, this partnership culminating in Dodger asking Dearden out on a date. After Connor's rescue, Dearden moved to London to pursue a romance with Dodger; however, the two eventually broke up and Dearden returned to the United States. She returned in a black costume, visually differentiating her from Green Arrow and Red Arrow (the new alias of Roy Harper).

During the Blackest Night storyline, Speedy briefly traveled to Coast City with Connor in order to fight off the Black Lantern invasion. She and Connor rescued Black Canary from Green Arrow, who had been transformed into a Black Lantern by Nekron. They returned to Star City following the end of Blackest Night.

During the events of Justice League: Cry for Justice, Dearden is babysitting Roy Harper's daughter Lian, but is called away when the Electrocutioner is sighted planting bombs, created by Prometheus, in Star City, which are intended to move Star City to an alternate universe. The bombs, however, do not teleport the city but instead begin destroying it. To Dearden's horror, the bombs destroy their home and kill Lian. This leads directly to the storyline of Rise and Fall.

In Rise and Fall, Speedy helps out Green Arrow after the Justice League attempts to capture him for killing Prometheus. While Green Arrow distracts the League, Speedy kidnaps the Electrocutioner and brings him to their hideout beneath Star City. Though Speedy begs Green Arrow for the chance to kill Electrocutioner, he convinces her that murder is not the answer, and takes Electrocutioner into custody. Following Electrocutioner's arrest, Dearden attends Lian's funeral alongside a number of prominent heroes, including her former teammates from the Teen Titans. During the service, Mia is attacked by Harper, who angrily blames her for Lian's death. Though Ravager intervenes and eventually causes Harper to leave, Dearden is left visibly shaken by his accusations.

Alongside Damian Wayne and a group of other ex-Titans, Speedy aids the then-current team of Teen Titans during their battle against Superboy-Prime and the Legion of Doom. During the battle, she and Ravager work together to successfully take down Persuader.

=== The New 52 ===
In September 2011, The New 52 rebooted DC's continuity. In this new timeline, the character is first mentioned in the Green Arrow storyline "Kingdom" when a mysterious individual tortures a man for information on the whereabouts of Mia Dearden, whom he somehow considers to be more of a threat to him than the Green Arrow. She is only shown in a picture. She says that her father, John King, is after her.

== Powers and abilities ==
Mia Dearden possesses no superhuman powers and abilities but is an accomplished archer. Unlike Connor Hawke, who relies on simple wooden shafts, Dearden employs trick arrows. In addition to a bow, Dearden is also proficient in the use of a crossbow. Although Mia is a skilled street fighter, Connor Hawke and Black Canary also taught her many forms of martial arts such as Krav Maga, Kenjustu and self-defense prior to her taking up the mantle of "Speedy". One year after Infinite Crisis, she expanded her training and is now an expert in sword combat.

== Other versions ==
In the Absolute Universe, an alternate universe version of Mia Dearden appears in Absolute Green Arrow. This version is a former programmer and close friend of Oliver Queen who later assists Dinah Lance in investigating billionaire Hector Hammond following Queen's assassination and the emergence of the mysterious Green Arrow Killer.

== In other media ==
=== Television ===
Elise Gatien as Mia Dearden as she appears in the Smallville episode "Crossfire"

- Mia Dearden appears in Smallville, portrayed by Elise Gatien. Similarly to the comics, this version is a brunette runaway who turned to prostitution before entering an underground boxing ring. In the episode "Crossfire", Oliver Queen finds Dearden and attempts to take her under his wing, but she betrays him to a criminal she owes money to. With Lois Lane's help, Queen rescues Dearden. In the episode "Disciple", Dearden is kidnapped by Vordigan before she is rescued by Queen and Clark Kent, during which she discovers the former's secret identity and becomes his protégée. She re-appears in Season 11, having adopted the name "Speedy" and joined Jay Garrick's Teen Titans.
- Characters inspired by Mia Dearden appear in Arrow:
  - A loose interpretation named Thea Dearden Queen (portrayed by Willa Holland) appears as the daughter of Malcolm Merlyn and half-sister of Oliver Queen. Throughout the series, she uses "Mia" as an alias and eventually goes on to join Team Arrow as Speedy.
  - A separate character named Mia Smoak (portrayed by Katherine McNamara) appears as Queen's future daughter from 2040 who takes on the mantle of the Green Arrow while helping him avert a "Crisis".

== Sources ==
- Speedy (DC)(Post Crisis)(02 - Mia Dearden) at the Comic Book DB (archived from the original)
- Mia Dearden (DC)(Post Flashpoint) at the Comic Book DB (archived from the original)
