= Merlyn (DC Comics) =

Supervillain appearing in DC Comics

- Malcolm Merlyn in Green Arrow (vol. 7) #6 (January 2024). Art by Sean Izaakse and Romulo Fajardo, Jr.

Publication information
- Publisher: DC Comics
- First appearance: Justice League of America #94 (November 1971)
- Created by: Mike Friedrich; Neal Adams; Dick Dillin

In-story information
- Alter ego: Arthur King (birth name); Malcolm Merlyn (legal name)
- Team affiliations: League of Assassins; Anti-Justice League; Injustice League; The 100; Killer Elite; Secret Society of Super Villains; Suicide Squad
- Notable aliases: Merlyn the Magician; Dark Archer
- Abilities: Master archer and marksman; Expert assassin; Expert martial artist and hand-to-hand combatant; Utilizes various high-tech specialty arrows; Cybernetic enhancements grant superhuman durability and illusion casting

Merlyn, also known as the Dark Archer, is a supervillain appearing in American comic books published by DC Comics. Created by writer Mike Friedrich and artists Neal Adams and Dick Dillin, the character first appeared in Justice League of America #94 (1971). Merlyn is the alias of Arthur King, a bow-wielding contract killer who is commonly affiliated with the League of Assassins. He serves as the archenemy of Green Arrow, although he has also fought other superheroes in the DC Universe, including Batman, Black Canary, and the Justice League.

The CW television series Arrow introduced and popularized Malcolm Merlyn, portrayed by John Barrowman, and his son Tommy Merlyn, portrayed by Colin Donnell, as Oliver Queen's nemesis and best friend, respectively. This concept would later be integrated into the comics, as Arthur King's legal name is retroactively established as Malcolm Merlyn, while Tommy briefly assumes the Dark Archer mantle from his father.

== Publication history ==
Merlyn was created by writer Mike Friedrich and artists Neal Adams and Dick Dillin. He first appeared in Justice League of America #94 in November 1971.

== Fictional character biography ==
Long before becoming the vigilante Green Arrow, Oliver Queen was inspired to take up archery after hearing of the exploits of Arthur King, otherwise known as "Merlyn the Magician", a master archer with acute accuracy. Years later, Merlyn challenged the Green Arrow to a public archery duel and defeated Oliver. With that victory under his belt, Merlyn vanished for years before resurfacing as a member of the League of Assassins. During his time with the League of Assassins, Merlyn took part in the highly abusive training of David Cain's daughter Cassandra Cain, unknowingly being behind the girl's skills as Batgirl. He and Green Arrow faced each other again when Merlyn attempted to assassinate Batman; Green Arrow managed to intercept Merlyn's arrow with one of his own, saving Batman's life. Merlyn admitted that Green Arrow had improved since their last encounter, but escaped before he could be captured.

In Action Comics, Merlyn, now working as a freelance assassin and contract killer who sells his skills to the highest bidder, is hired by Queen Bee (Zazzala) to join a supervillain team and take on the Justice League. He then serves under Tobias Whale as a member of Metropolis' crime syndicate the 100. Merlyn attempts to kill Black Lightning when he accompanies Joey Toledo. Though the League of Assassins crash the battle when they were displeased that Merlyn left them. He is ultimately defeated by Black Lightning while Toledo was killed during the three-way battle. A man from Libya later hires Meryln to kill a Russian scientist visiting Casablanca. Although Merlyn is aided by Syonide, his assassination attempt is foiled by the Flash and Phantom Lady.

During the events of "Underworld Unleashed," Merlyn is among the villains who sell their souls to the demon Neron in exchange for greater power. He then joins the Killer Elite (along with Deadshot, Monocle, Bolt, Chiller, and Deadline) to perform various assassinations with Merlyn wanting to do his dream assassination on Batman, but the group is eventually stopped by the Justice League. The Killer Elite later encounters the Body Doubles, and Merlyn and his team are defeated.

In Young Justice, Merlyn mentors Turk, a wolf-like metahuman and archer. Merlyn and Turk attempt to sabotage an archery contest in their favor, but are stopped by Young Justice.

Merlyn next appears as one of the primary villains in the Injustice Gang in Identity Crisis. He warns and correctly predicts that the death of Sue Dibny would have troublesome and dire consequences in the criminal underworld. Although the Justice League manages to capture Merlyn, Monacle, and Deadshot, the latter is able to use connections with the Suicide Squad and Amanda Waller to arrange for their release, much to the frustration of the newest Manhunter. Merlyn, Deadshot, Monacle, and Phobia later attempt to kill the Shadow Thief during his trial, but are confronted and stopped by Manhunter.

During the "Infinite Crisis" storyline, Merlyn appears as a member of Alexander Luthor Jr.'s Society. Since then, he has resumed his feud with Green Arrow, launching several attacks on the hero's family. Merlyn plays a major role in the attack on Green Arrow and Black Canary's wedding as a member of the new Injustice League.

During Countdown, Merlyn appears under the employ of the League of Assassins, coordinating his attacks with Talia al Ghul and serving as a mentor to Damian Wayne. Merlyn has a minor role in The Resurrection of Ra's al Ghul, in which he is hired by the Sensei to take out a spring where Ra's al Ghul could revitalize himself. He is defeated during the final confrontation between Ra's and Batman. Merlyn then joins the League of Assassins' elite team known as the Seven Men of Death, and is sent to Gotham City to retrieve the Suit of Sorrows from the Order of Purity. During the attack on the Order, Merlyn kills the Order's leader Leland McCauley, and injures Felicidad Gomez before being confronted by Azrael. Merlyn and his team attempt to capture Azrael and move him to their headquarters, but Azrael uses one of Merlyn's own arrows to stab him.

Merlyn is later captured by the vigilante Cupid who plans to kill him in front of Green Arrow, with whom Cupid is besotted. To this end, she slashes Merlyn's throat with an arrow, and although Green Arrow is able to get Merlyn medical attention in time to save his life, the villain's vocal cords are severely damaged.

=== The New 52 ===
In The New 52 reboot's Batman Incorporated, Merlyn appears under the League of Assassins' employ and serves as a member of the Seven Men of Death who are tasked by Talia al Ghul's Leviathan organization to destroy Batman Incorporated. Merlyn defeats members of the group with ease, until Damian Wayne destroys his bow. In Forever Evil, Merlyn is among the villains recruited by the Crime Syndicate of America to join the Secret Society of Super Villains.

=== DC Rebirth ===
In the DC Rebirth relaunch, the Green Arrow series reveals that Merlyn was born Arthur King and legally changed his name (a concept incorporated from the Arrow television series). When he was around 25 years old, Malcolm joined the League of Assassins, an ancient, international order of the world's greatest killers, and was trained by their leader Ra's al Ghul himself. Malcolm's commencement ceremony into the organization involved him digging a grave which he laid in to purge himself of his past life and emerge reborn. Now a deadly assassin known as the Dark Archer, Malcolm is contracted by Cyrus Broderick, a director of the Ninth Circle, to frame Green Arrow for murder after he destroys the Inferno, their base of operations. Using arrows resembling Green Arrow's for multiple high-profile killings, including the murder of famous soccer player Cy Sampson, the Dark Archer succeeds in tarnishing the hero's image and reputation. Green Arrow and the Dark Archer later engage in a fierce duel, with Oliver believing the hooded villain to be Malcolm's son, Tommy. Malcolm then reveals himself to Oliver as "the original Dark Archer", and proceeds to best his foe in combat whilst taunting him. Before Malcolm can kill Oliver, however, the intervention of Black Canary and the police forces the villain to flee. As he escapes, Merlyn fires an arrow at the police chief, whom Green Arrow narrowly manages to save at the cost of his own bow, which is shattered by Merlyn's shot.

In Batman, Merlyn was one of the assassins hired by the Penguin and the Designer to kill Batman. He was captured by the GCPD, but managed to escape. He, along with Cheshire, attempts to attack Catwoman and Harley Quinn before they defeat him.

== Powers and abilities ==
Merlyn is among the greatest and most accurate archers in the DC Universe. His archery and marksmanship skills rival those of Green Arrow, and exceed those of Emiko Queen, Shado, Roy Harper, Connor Hawke, Celestial Archer, and his own son Tommy. Merlyn has been known to use trick arrows to kill his targets, including explosive arrows that detonate upon impact. Having been trained by the League of Assassins, he is proficient with swords, throwing knives, and various other weapons, and is an expert in numerous forms of hand-to-hand combat and martial arts, being able to best the likes of Green Arrow with relative ease.

After the defeat of the Leviathan organization, portions of Merlyn's body are replaced by advanced cybernetics, granting him superhuman durability and illusion casting abilities.

== Other versions ==
In the Absolute Universe, an alternate universe version of Merlyn appears in Absolute Green Arrow. This version is a Kobra assassin named Arthur King who assumes the identity of Malcolm Merlyn to infiltrate Hector Hammond's inner circle and investigate his unethical human experimentation. He operates under the shared identity of Green Arrow alongside his protégé, Connor Hawke, with whom he targets and kills corrupt billionaires connected to Hammond's conspiracy. Merlyn is eventually killed by Solomon Grundy, leaving Connor to continue operating as the sole Green Arrow.

== In other media ==
=== Television ===
- Merlyn makes non-speaking appearances in Justice League Unlimited as a member of Gorilla Grodd's second Secret Society.
- A character based on the Dark Archer named Vordigan appears in Smallville, portrayed by Steve Bacic. This version is a member of the Brotherhood of Sion, later Toyman's Marionette Ventures, and the mentor-turned-adversary of Oliver Queen.

==== Arrowverse ====
John Barrowman as Malcolm Merlyn

Malcolm Merlyn / Dark Archer appears in media set in the Arrowverse, portrayed by John Barrowman.

- Introduced and primarily featured in Arrow, this version is a wealthy businessman, the CEO of Merlyn Global Group, and the father of Tommy Merlyn and Thea Queen. After his wife is murdered by Brick in a crime-infested area of Starling City known as "the Glades", Malcolm abandons Tommy and trains with the League of Assassins as Al Sa-her (Arabic: الساحر; "The Magician"), returning years later to plot an "Undertaking" to level the Glades with an earthquake device. Malcolm sabotages Robert Queen's yacht for attempting to interfere with his plans, indirectly stranding Robert's son Oliver on Lian Yu for five years. Although Malcolm's Undertaking succeeds at the end of the first season, Tommy is among its casualties. In the second season, Malcolm resurfaces after faking his death and convinces Thea to join him. In the third season, Malcolm manipulates Oliver's team into helping him defeat the League of Assassins' leader, allowing Malcolm to replace him as the next Ra's al Ghul. In the fourth season, Malcolm becomes engaged in a civil war with Nyssa al Ghul for control of the League that is ended when Oliver severs Malcolm's left hand. At the end of the fifth season, Malcolm seemingly dies in an explosion off-screen when he sacrifices himself to help Oliver rescue Thea from Prometheus.
  - Malcolm's Earth-2 counterpart appears in the eighth season. This version is married to Moira Queen and has no connection to the Undertaking, as Tommy is the Dark Archer on this earth rather than Malcolm.
- Malcolm appears in the crossover events "Heroes Join Forces" and "Elseworlds".
  - A musical-gangster film-inspired incarnation of Malcolm named "Cutter" Moran appears in a dream world in The Flash episode "Duet".
- Malcolm appears in the second season of Legends of Tomorrow as a member of the Legion of Doom. The Legion locates and uses the fabled Spear of Destiny to rewrite reality to their whims, only to be defeated by the Legends and returned to their original places in the timeline with no memory of these events.

=== Film ===
- Merlyn appears in the unproduced Green Arrow: Escape from Super Max as an inmate of the titular prison.
- Merlyn the Magnificent appears in DC Showcase: Green Arrow, voiced by Malcolm McDowell.

=== Video games ===
- Merlyn appears as a non-player character (NPC) in Green Arrow's S.T.A.R. Labs missions in Injustice: Gods Among Us.
- The Arrowverse incarnation of Malcolm Merlyn appears in Lego Batman 3: Beyond Gotham as part of the Arrow DLC.
- Malcolm Merlyn appears in Lego DC Super-Villains, voiced by John Barrowman. This version is a member of the Legion of Doom.

=== Miscellaneous ===
- The Arrowverse incarnation of Malcolm Merlyn / Dark Archer appears in The CW's Superhero Fight Club promotional video, which was released in April 2015, with John Barrowman reprising the role.
- The Arrowverse incarnation of Malcolm Merlyn features in the Arrow tie-in comic The Dark Archer, written by John Barrowman and his sister Carole, in which the character's birth name is revealed to be Arthur King.
- Merlyn appears in the Young Justice tie-in comic Young Justice: Targets.
