= Connor Hawke =

DC Comics superhero

- Artwork of Connor Hawke's design for the 2023 Green Arrow series. Art by Sean Izaakse.

Publication information
- Publisher: DC Comics
- First appearance: Green Arrow (vol. 2) #0 (October 1994)
- Created by: Kelley Puckett (writer); Jim Aparo (artist)

In-story information
- Alter ego: Connor Hawke
- Species: Human (current); Metahuman (former)
- Team affiliations: Team Arrow; Justice League; League of Assassins
- Partnerships: Oliver Queen / Green Arrow; Green Lantern / Kyle Rayner; Cassandra Cain; Tim Drake
- Supporting character of: Green Arrow
- Notable aliases: Hawke
- Abilities: Peak physical conditioning, master martial artist, and expert in archery and marksmanship.

Connor Hawke is a superhero who operated as the second Green Arrow, created by Kelley Puckett and Jim Aparo. In the post-Zero Hour continuity, Connor is the eldest son of Oliver Queen, the original Green Arrow, and his former college girlfriend Sandra "Moonday" Hawke, making him the heir of Oliver's estates and Green Arrow legacy. Connor Hawke first appeared in Green Arrow (vol. 2) #0 (1994). He appears in American comic books published by DC Comics.

The character's prominence in DC comics has gone up and down at many points following his short-lived tenure as a full-time replacement for Oliver Queen. For a decade, from 2011 to 2021, the character was largely absent after DC attempted to make Oliver Queen a younger man again and to reintroduce his supporting cast gradually as part of its The New 52 relaunch, although versions of the character continued to appear in comics set elsewhere in the DC Comics Multiverse. With the Infinite Frontier initiative in 2021, Connor is restored to prominence, reintroduced as the second Green Arrow and Oliver's illegitimate son. Furthermore, Connor's multi-racial European, African, and Korean background is made more prominent. The DC Pride 2022 anthology confirmed that Connor is asexual.

Outside of comics, multiple versions of Connor appear in The CW's Arrowverse, where Connor Hawke is the pseudonym of the Earth-16 counterpart of John Diggle's son, portrayed by Joseph David-Jones while the other Connor Hawke, portrayed by Aiden Stoxx in the present and David-Jones in the future, is the son of Ben Turner. Separately, another loose adaptation of Connor's comic book origin story involves Oliver discovering he has an illegitimate son named William Clayton, is also depicted on Arrow with the present-day version portrayed by Jack Moore and the future adult version portrayed by Ben Lewis.

== Fictional character biography ==
=== Meeting Oliver Queen ===
Connor Hawke met Oliver Queen after Oliver came to stay at the ashram where Connor had been studying for some years. Oliver who had previously retreated to the ashram decades before, looking for peace after accidentally killing a criminal, returned to the ashram under similar circumstances, haunted by the thought that he had killed his former best friend Hal Jordan, who, at the time, was involuntarily serving as the host of the entity Parallax. Thanks to Connor, who was a big fan of Green Arrow, Oliver was able to regain a semblance of inner peace and venture out into the world again, especially after numerous attempts on his life had been made.

Connor decides to journey with Oliver, and created a costume similar to his. Oliver learns that Connor is his son after being visited by Hal Jordan's ghost. Oliver subsequently agrees to go undercover in an eco-terrorist group called the Eden Corps for the government. The mission turns out to be fatal for Oliver, as his arm is connected to a bomb in a plane that was headed for Metropolis. Refusing to allow his arm to be amputated, he sacrifices himself to let the bomb explode away from the city. With his father dead, Connor takes the Green Arrow name.

=== The new Green Arrow ===
Connor Hawke's debut as Green Arrow in Green Arrow (vol. 2) #0 (1994). Art by Jim Aparo.

Connor continues to travel with Eddie, accompanied at times by Connor's martial arts mentor Master Jansen. Connor tries to find his place not only in the hero world, but also in the legacy of Green Arrow. Akin to the friendship between his father and Hal Jordan, Connor quickly befriends the new Green Lantern (Kyle Rayner), who himself was struggling to live up to a legacy.

Besides making other friends such as Robin (Tim Drake), he also made significant enemies in the fighting world, including the Silver Monkey, an assassin and member of the Monkey Fist martial arts cult. Their first encounter resulted in a decisive loss for Connor, which was also filmed and sold underground. Connor's close win in a rematch resulted in a loss of face for the Monkey Fist cult and set Connor on a path that would bring him face to face with Lady Shiva, said to be the deadliest assassin in the world. During the Brotherhood of the Fist storyline, the Monkey Fist schools attacked various world-class martial artists attempting to prove their worthiness and skill after having been dishonored by the Silver Monkey's loss. Under the alias "Paper Monkey," Shiva arrived in Gotham City where Connor had allied with Batman, Nightwing, and Robin. Shiva's final opponent was Connor, who was the prime target of the Monkey Fist. Though a close and taxing contest, Shiva was the victor, with Connor unconscious and defenseless. Thankfully, Shiva's old pupil, Tim Drake who had saved her life during a previous encounter, asked her not to kill Connor, trading a life for a life. After warning Robin that using the favor now meant she would challenge and kill the boy wonder when he was older, she refrained from killing Connor and departed. Batman warned Connor that he would be perceived as surviving a battle with Shiva through his own skill and would therefore be a possible target for any fighters building their way up to a battle against her.

Connor also applied for membership in the JLA, replacing his father. On the date of his second interview, he singlehandedly saved the League from the hands of the Key, defeating the Key's robots by using his father's old trick arrows after the Key had destroyed his own. In the end, he knocked out the Key using his father's trademark boxing glove arrow, and was accepted as a member of the JLA.

He would later be used by Batman as a "traitor" in the League in a ploy to defeat Lex Luthor's Injustice Gang. Connor left the League afterward, feeling he was better suited for the street-level work and out of his element in the epic adventures of the Justice League, although he did remain on reserve status. During this time, he also developed a friendship with Kyle Rayner, the latest Green Lantern, occasionally contacting Kyle for help if he felt that he was dealing with a problem that went beyond his skillset. One unique mission against the Eden Corps- the organisation responsible for Oliver Queen's death- saw Connor team up with a temporally-displaced Hal Jordan, pulled from early in his career as a hero, with the two musing on how they had each never had a chance to know Oliver (As Hal was from a point before he had developed his close ties to the archer). He and Eddie returned for a time to the ashram where Connor was raised, although they both often returned to the outside world, aiding Robin at one point when his Brentwood Academy roommate had been attacked by a demon, and again when Robin, the Spoiler, and Batgirl were attempting to protect Robin's father from an ancient cult.

=== Return to action ===
When Oliver returned from the dead, Connor left the ashram and tracked him down. After Connor manages to save his father from warlock Stanley Dover, Connor and Oliver move in together in Star City. The two live with Mia Dearden, a runaway that Oliver has taken in and trained as his new sidekick Speedy. Since returning to the superhero life, Connor has been wounded seriously twice, once by the villain Onomatopoeia and once by Constantine Drakon, but he continues in his hero role. He is the voice of reason for Oliver, and the two have since formed a real father-son relationship. During his recovery from Onomatopoeia's attack, Oliver Queen and his former sidekick Roy Harper went on a trip across the country recovering old possessions. One of them was an old photograph which revealed that Oliver had been present at Connor's birth, but later ran from the responsibility of being a father. Oliver kept this fact from his son. However, Connor already learned the truth years ago from his mother, and has already forgiven him without Oliver's knowledge.

=== "One Year Later" ===
During the 2006 "One Year Later" storyline, Connor is revealed to be on an island with Mia Dearden and Oliver Queen as Oliver trains for his return to Star City.

In November 2006, Connor starred in his own six issue miniseries, entitled Connor Hawke: Dragon's Blood. It was written by Chuck Dixon with art by Derec Donovan. Dixon stated, "A big surprise leads to major changes in Connor's life, particularly as it relates to his father."

In Tony Bedard's Black Canary miniseries, Connor is shot by League of Assassins agents and infected with a neurotoxin, leaving him in a vegetative state. However, after Oliver and Dinah return home from getting married, the nurses tending to Connor are found dead, with Connor missing. This quest leads him to Doctor Sivana, who has utilized a neural patch to turn Connor into a mindless drone. Connor is rescued by Oliver and finally awakens from his comatose state.

After his coma, however, Connor starts exhibiting several unusual traits. Physically healthy, he's now amnesiac and oblivious to everything happened to him before waking up (even his life as a superhero) and he feels no pain at all and exhibits a strong healing factor, forcing Dinah to ask for outside help. A brief examination of his physical make-up, made by Batman and Doctor Mid-Nite, reveals that he was enhanced with Plastic Man's DNA, along with several other alterations fully accounting for his new healing factor and high pain threshold. His memories however come back only in a fragmentary, confused way, with none of the emotional attachments previously experienced, and he has lost his archery skills.

=== "Blackest Night" and return ===
In Blackest Night, Connor travels to Coast City and battles Green Arrow after Nekron transforms him into a Black Lantern. He is hesitant to fight his father, but eventually stops him by spraying him with liquid nitrogen. After Oliver's defeat, Connor, Mia, and Dinah join in the fight against the other Black Lanterns.

After this, Connor returns to the ruins of Star City (which had been destroyed just prior to Blackest Night) and tries to help maintain order. Connor is approached by Oliver, now a fugitive after having murdered Prometheus, the villain that destroyed the city in the first place. Oliver tries to talk to his son, but Connor angrily states that his battle with his Black Lantern father somehow jogged his memory, and that he now remembers all the terrible things Oliver had done to him. When Oliver tells Connor that he had thought he had forgiven him, Connor states that he no longer has the strength to forgive him for his transgressions. Though he refuses to turn Oliver over to the Justice League, he also refuses to help him, instead telling him to do the right thing for once in his life.

=== Infinite Frontier ===
Connor Hawke in the interior artwork of Green Arrow 80th Anniversary Spectacular Vol. 1 #1 (June 2021). Art by Howard Porter.

Following The New 52 continuity reboot, Connor appears as a member of the League of Shadows, a splinter faction of the League of Assassins.

The DC Pride 2022 anthology confirms Connor to be asexual, following decades of fan speculation. The debut story, titled "Think of Me", was created by an entirely-asexual team consisting of Ro Stein, Ted Brandt, and Frank Cvetkovic.

Connor Hawke makes his first appearance in the Robin series written by Joshua Williamson where he comes into conflict with Damian Wayne during a tournament for the Lazarus Pits. Connor answers Nightwing's call to participates in Dark Crisis against Pariah, and helps Black Canary, and Roy Harper locate Green Arrow.

== Parentage confusion ==
Throughout the later issues of the first Green Arrow series written by Chuck Dixon, Connor's mother was identified as Sandra "Moonday" Hawke; a flighty ex-hippie, who had reportedly been one of many conquests for a young Oliver Queen. Moonday played a frequent supporting role in the series, often requiring rescue due to the machinations of her husband - an arms dealer named Milo Armitage, who would be a frequent foe of the new Green Arrow.

Shado, an assassin who also mothered a child with Oliver Queen, is often identified as Connor Hawke's mother. One reason for this is because of a Wizard Magazine issue, which identified Connor's first appearance in comics being in Green Arrow (vol. 2) #24. While this was the first appearance of Shado's infant son (who was later revealed to be named Robert), Connor appeared as a man in his early-twenties in Green Arrow (vol. 2) #0. Both Robert and Connor were seen together, many years apart in age, in Chuck Dixon's 2007 Dragon's Blood miniseries. Furthermore, in Birds of Prey #109, in which Barbara Gordon identifies Shado as Connor Hawke's mother when running down a list of women with whom Oliver Queen cheated on long-time girlfriend Dinah Lance. Writer Tony Bedard acknowledged this as an error on his part, with the error being removed in future printings.

== Powers and abilities ==
Typically depicted with no inherent superpowers, Connor is considered a highly skilled martial artist and archer. Connor's prowess in the former depicts him among the best fighters within the DC Universe, making him comparable or surpassing notable formidable fighters such as his father, Nightwing, Lady Shiva, and Damian Wayne although he is not as capable in marksmanship as his father. He is also a proficient swordsman.

Connor may have some degree of enhanced protection or regenerative powers as a result of his bathing in the blood of a dragon (in Dragon's Blood) and having his DNA spliced with Plastic Man's (in Green Arrow and Black Canary). This has been alluded to in the respective series, but rarely mentioned otherwise.

== Other versions ==
- An alternate universe version of Connor Hawke from Earth-16 appears in The Multiversity: The Just.
- An alternate universe version of Connor Hawke from Earth-2 appears in The New 52. This version operates as Red Arrow before being killed by Apokoliptian forces, after which Oliver Queen succeeds him as Red Arrow.
- In the Absolute Universe, an alternate universe version of Connor Hawke appears in Absolute Green Arrow. This version is the estranged son of Oliver Queen who, following his father's assassination, assumes the shared identity of Green Arrow alongside his mentor, Malcolm Merlyn, to kill corrupt billionaires involved in a conspiracy surrounding Hector Hammond. The two stage Connor's death to conceal their identities from Dinah Lance, who is investigating the killings on behalf of Hammond. After Merlyn is fatally wounded while fighting Solomon Grundy and Hammond's crimes are exposed, Connor continues operating as the sole Green Arrow, seeking to inspire resistance against corruption.

== In other media ==
=== Television ===
Joseph David-Jones as Earth-16 John Diggle, Jr./ Green Arrow in Legends of Tomorrow

Numerous characters based on Connor Hawke appear in media set in the Arrowverse.

- An alternate timeline version of Connor Hawke from Earth-16 appears in the first season of Legends of Tomorrow, portrayed by Joseph David-Jones. He is the son of John Diggle and succeeds Oliver Queen as Green Arrow following his presumed death.
- A separate alternate timeline version of Connor appears in the seventh season of Arrow, with David-Jones reprising the role. He is the son of Ben Turner and has an estranged brother named John Diggle Jr. (portrayed by Charlie Barnett) who is the leader of the Deathstroke Gang.
- William Clayton, a character based on Connor Hawke, appears in The Flash, portrayed by Jack Moore as a child and Ben Lewis as an adult.

=== Film ===
Connor Hawke as Speedy appears in Justice League: Crisis on Infinite Earths.

=== Video games ===
A character based on Connor Hawke named Connor Lance-Queen appears in Injustice 2.

=== Miscellaneous ===
- Connor Hawke appears in Adventures in the DC Universe.
- The Injustice: Gods Among Us incarnation of Connor Hawke appears in the prequel comic.
