= 1971 in comics =

Notable events of 1971 in comics.

== Events ==
=== January ===
- January 6: The first episode of Kees Stip and Nico Visscher's newspaper gag-a-day comic In de Wolken is published. It will run until 1979.
- January 10: The castle of Nederhorst den Berg in the Netherlands burns down, also destroying Marten Toonder's comic studio.
- January 12: In Pif Gadget, the Corto Maltese story La Conga des Bananes by Hugo Pratt kicks off. The story belongs to a cycle of Corto Maltese's adventures set in Central America and South America (Beyond the windy isles). This story marks the debut of the dark lady Venexiana Stevenson, a recurring antagonist of the captain.
- January 28: The Comics Code becomes less strict and will soften its rules a few more times during the year. Initially "liberalized" on January 28, 1971, to allow for (among other things) the sometimes "sympathetic depiction of criminal behavior . . . [and] corruption among public officials" ("as long as it is portrayed as exceptional and the culprit is punished") as well as permitting some criminal activities to kill law-enforcement officers and the "suggestion but not portrayal of seduction." Also newly allowed were "vampires, ghouls and werewolves . . . when handled in the classic tradition such as Frankenstein, Dracula, and other high calibre literary works written by Edgar Allan Poe, Saki, Conan Doyle and other respected authors whose works are read in schools around the world." Zombies, lacking the requisite "literary" background, remain taboo.
- January 30: Al Capp and Raeburn Van Buren's Abbie an' Slats comes to a close after nearly 34 years of syndication.
- Blackmark published by Bantam Books. Conceived and drawn by Gil Kane, and scripted by Archie Goodwin from an outline by Kane, it is one of the first American graphic novels.
- "The Sandman Saga" Superman story-arc, written by Denny O'Neil and drawn by Curt Swan, begins in Superman #233 (running almost continuously through the September issue, #242). Among other things, the story arc eliminates all Kryptonite on Earth, makes Clark Kent less wimpy, and essentially reinvents Superman for the Bronze Age.
- Bad Day for Troop A by Carl Barks.
- Empire of a Thousand Planets (album) by Pierre Christin and Jean-Claude Mézières.

=== February ===
- Alan Light publishes the first issue of The Buyer's Guide to Comics Fandom.
- World's Finest Comics #200: "Prisoners of the Immortal World!" by Mike Friedrich, Dick Dillin, and Joe Giella. (DC Comics)
- New Gods #1 (February /March ) (DC Comics) by Jack Kirby

First appearances of Highfather, Kalibak, Lightray, and Orion

- Chamber of Darkness, with issue #9, changes its name to Monsters on the Prowl. (Marvel Comics)

=== Spring ===
- Classics Illustrated, published under that title since March 1947 (and before that as Classic Comics since 1941), canceled by Gilberton after 288 issues.

=== March ===
- March 2: The first episode of Bill Tidy's The Fosdyke Saga appears in print. The series will continue until 1985.
- March 4: The first episode of the Astérix story The Mansions of the Gods, by Goscinny and Uderzo, is prepublished in Pilote.
- March 11: The final episode of Andries Brandt's Horre, Harm en Hella is published.
- March 14: In the story La resa dei conti (The showdown), by Claudio Nizzi and Carlo Boscarato, Larry Yuma gets his definitive name (in the two previous episodes, the character was called Dave).
- March 20: Andries Brandt and Jan Van Haasteren's Aafje Anders makes its debut. After a few stories Robert Hamilton and Richard Klokkers take over the artwork. The series will run until 17 April 1973.
- The Avengers #85 (Marvel Comics)

First appearance of the Squadron Supreme, as well as members Blue Eagle, Doctor Spectrum, Golden Archer, Hyperion, Lady Lark, Nighthawk, Tom Thumb, and Whizzer.

- Nick Fury, Agent of S.H.I.E.L.D., with issue #18, canceled by Marvel.
- Tower of Shadows, with issue #10, changes its name to Creatures on the Loose. (Marvel Comics)
- Ka-Zar, with issue #3, is canceled by Marvel.
- Bill Griffith's Zippy the Pinhead makes it debut.
- Il figlio di Mefisto by Gianluigi Bonelli and Galep. The evil wizard Mefisto, dies, torn apart by rats, but in the same story his son Yama takes his place as Tex Willer’s nemesis.

=== April ===
- April 1: in Pilote, first chapter of Ma Dalton, by Goscinny and Uderzo.
- April: The final issue of the long-running French satirical cartoons and comics magazine Le Rire is published.
- Mister Miracle #1 (DC Comics)

First appearance of Mister Miracle

- Aquaman (1962 series), with issue #56, is canceled by DC Comics.

=== May ===
- May 8: Al Capp is charged with sexual harassment, sodomy, attempted adultery and indecent exposure. The trial on 12 February 1972 will eventually only fine him for attempted adultery in a plea bargain, but damages his public image and the popularity of Li'l Abner beyond repair.
- May 10: The final episode of John M. Burns' The Seekers is published.
- May 11: in Le journal de Tintin, first chapter of Rush by Jean Graton.
- Action Comics #400: "My Son... Is He Man or Beast?", by Leo Dorfman, Curt Swan, and Murphy Anderson.
- The "Green Goblin Reborn!" story-arc begins in The Amazing Spider-Man #96 (continuing through issue #98). Written by Stan Lee, and drawn by Gil Kane and John Romita, Sr., it is recognized as the first mainstream comic publication which portrayed and condemned drug abuse, and was published without the seal of approval of the Comics Code Authority.
- Detective Comics #411 (DC Comics)

First appearance of Talia al Ghul

- Forever People #2 (DC Comics)

First appearance of DeSaad

- Mister Miracle #2 (DC Comics)

First appearance of Granny Goodness

- With the publication of Savage Tales #1, Marvel creates its black-and-white magazine line, which published material that doesn't carry the seal of the Comics Code Authority.

First appearance of Man-Thing

=== June ===
- June 10: In Pilote, the first chapter of the Blueberry story L'Homme qui valait 500 000 $ is published by Jean-Michel Charlier and Jean Giraud.
- June 12: The first issue of the British comics magazine Knockout is published.
- June 12: Norman Mansbridge's Fuss Pot makes its debut in Knockout.
- June 17: In San Diego, California, Peanuts Day is declared.
- June 26: The final episode of Marten Toonder's Koning Hollewijn is published.
- Batman #232 (DC Comics)

First appearance of Ra's al Ghul

- The "Kree-Skrull War" story arc, written by Roy Thomas, begins in The Avengers #89 (running through issue #97, March 1972).
- Captain America and the Falcon #138: "It Happens in Harlem," drawn by John Romita, Sr.
- Tarzan #200: "The Secret Vaults of Opar," by Gaylord DuBois, Paul Norris, and Mike Royer. (Gold Key)
- Hollywood Romances, with issue #59, cancelled by Charlton.
- The first issue of the Italian humor series Abelarda, le avventure di una nonna terribile (The adventures of a terrible grandma), is published by Bianconi.

=== July ===
- 10-16 July: The first episode of Peter de Smet's De Generaal is published. It will run until 1997.
- 20 July: In Charles M. Schulz' Peanuts Marcie makes her debut.
- July 25: in Il Giornalino, debut of the Science-fiction series Gli Astrostoppisti (The star hitchhikers) by Alfredo Castelli and Nevio Zeccara.
- The final episode of Vic Forsythe's long-running newspaper comic Joe Jinks appears in print.
- House of Secrets #92 (DC Comics)

First appearance of Swamp Thing
The woman appearing on the cover of this issue was modeled after future comics writer Louise Simonson.

- The Incredible Hulk #141 (Marvel Comics)

First appearance of Doc Samson

- Timmy the Timid Ghost (vol. 2), with issue #23, canceled by Charlton.

=== August ===
- August 3: in Le journal de Tintin, first chapter of Le Monstre de Noireville, by André-Paul Duchâteau and Tibet.
- August 5: In the obscenity case against the British underground magazine Oz and their issue Schoolkids Oz the publishers are convicted. Particularly a pornographic parody of the children's comic Rupert Bear made by a 16-year old pupil named Vivian Berger drew a lot of controversy. However, within a few months the sentences are overturned.
- August 22: Henry Formhals quits drawing Freckles and His Friends, bringing the newspaper comic to a close after nearly 55 years of syndication.
- DC Comics raises the price of its typical comic book from 15 cents to 25 cents, and the page-count from 36 to 52 by adding reprints and new backup features.
- The "Snowbirds Don't Fly" story-arc, written by Denny O'Neil and drawn by Neal Adams, begins in Green Lantern #85 (August/September cover date) (concluding in issue #86). (DC Comics)

=== September ===
- September 9: In Spirou, the first chapter of the Spirou et Fantasio story L'abbaye truquée by Jean-Claude Fournier appears in print.
- September 18: Vic Neill first publishes The McTickles in The Beano.
- September 23:
  - In Spirou, Jean-Marie Brouyère and Malik's series Archie Cash makes its debut.
  - In Pif Gadget, the Corto Maltese story L'ange à la fenetre d'orient, by Hugo Pratt is first published. Set in Venice, it begins a new arc of Corto Maltese's adventures, with the First World War as background (Celtic Tales).
- September 25: The final issue of the British comics magazine TV Century 21 is published.
- September 30: The first episode of Asterix and the Laurel Wreath, by René Goscinny and Albert Uderzo, is prepublished in Pilote.
- The first episode of Henk Groeneveld's gag comic Opa is published.
- The Amazing Spider-Man #100: "The Spider or the Man?", by Stan Lee, Gil Kane, and Frank Giacoia. "The Six Arms Saga" story-arc begins (running through issue #102).
- With issue #20, Ghost Manor vol. 1 changes its title to Ghostly Haunts.

=== October ===
- October 5: In Tintin, the first chapters of Edgar P. Jacobs Mortimer in Tokyo and of the Bruno Brazil story La Nuit des Chacals (The Jackals’ Night) by Greg and William Vance are prepublished.
- October 22: In Copenhagen the comics store Fantask opens its doors, which will become the oldest Danish comics store in the world.
- October 22: first issue of the Italian magazine Menelik (Tattilo editore) dedicated to quality erotic comics.
- The Brave and the Bold #98 (written by Bob Haney) — Jim Aparo's first issue as artist. Haney and Aparo continue to contribute the majority of issues until the series' finale in July 1983.
- In the Days of the Mob #1 and Spirit World #1, two one-shot black-and-white magazines by Jack Kirby.
- Mister Miracle #4 (DC Comics)

First appearance of Big Barda

- The Amazing Spider-Man #101 (Marvel Comics)

First appearance of Morbius, the Living Vampire

- Girls' Romances (1950 series), with issue #160, is cancelled by DC.
- Under the sign of Capricorn, by Hugo Pratt, album reckoning six Corto Maltese's adventures set in the Caribbean and in Brazil.

=== November ===
- Marvel Comics, following rival DC's lead, raises the price of its typical comic book from 15 cents to 25 cents, and the page-count from 36 to 52.
- The Avengers #93: Neal Adams begins his celebrated stint as Avengers artist, continuing the "Kree-Skrull War" story arc begun in issue #89 of the title.
- DC Special (1968 series), with issue #15 (November /December cover date), is cancelled by DC.

=== December ===
- December 3: The first episode of Jean-Pol's Annie en Peter is published in Zonnestraal. It will run in this magazine until 1980, but the series itself will continue until 1987.
- December 16: in Pilote, first chapter of Welcome to Alflolol by Pierre Christin and Jean-Claude Mezieres.
- December 28 :
  - In Tintin magazine the first chapter of Michel Vaillant story Losing Streak by Jean Graton is prepublished.
  - The Suske en Wiske story De Gekke Gokker kicks off in the newspapers De Standaard and Het Nieuwsblad. It's the first story where creator Willy Vandersteen passes on the pencil to his successor Paul Geerts.
- Marcel Gotlib launches his gag comic Hamster Jovial in the magazine Rock et Folk.
- After a month-long experimentation with 25-cent comics, Marvel reduces the price of a typical comic to 20 cents, and returns the page-count from 52 to 36 pages.
- Bill Spicer, Michael Moore and Fred Walker found the Los Angeles Comic Book Company in Los Angeles.
- The Avengers #94: First appearance of the Mandroid power armor.
- Marvel Feature #1 (Marvel Comics)

First appearance of The Defenders

- Green Lantern #87 (DC Comics)

First appearance of John Stewart

=== Specific date unknown ===
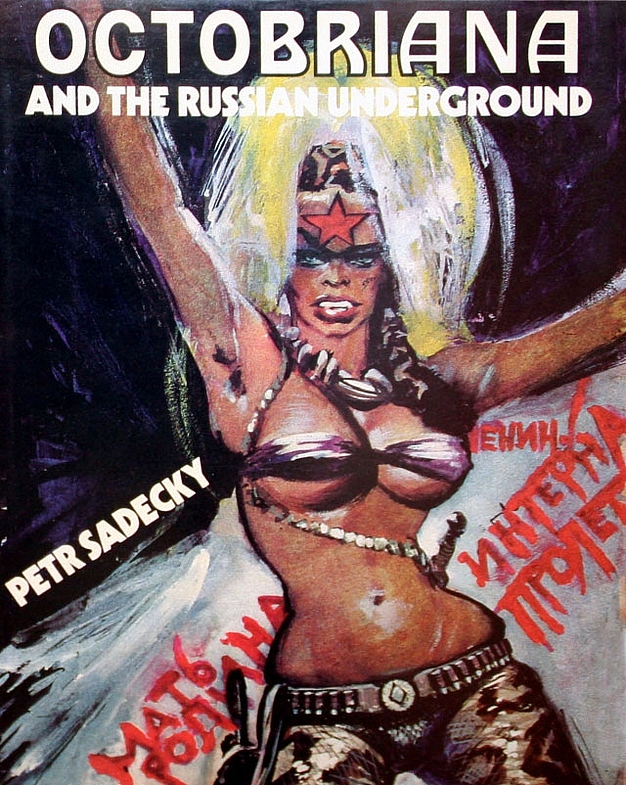
Octobriana

- A Soviet detector, Petr Sadecký, reveals the existence of a supposed underground comix heroine, Octobriana, whose stories are distributed in secret behind the Iron Curtain in Eastern Europe and Russia. His story is later revealed to be a hoax, as the comics are actually a completely normal and legal Czech comic series named Amazona, created by Zdeněk Burian and Bohumil Konečný, who are completely unaware of his scam.
- The first issue of the Flemish comics magazine/fanzine CISO-Magazine is published by Danny De Laet. It will change its name into Stripgids in 1974 and receive a new chief editor, Jan Smet.
- The Finnish Comics Society is established.
- The final episode of Fuku-Chan by Ryuichi Yokoyama is published.
- Ever Meulen becomes cartoonist for the magazine HUMO and develops his gag comics Piet Peuk and Balthazar de Groene Steenvreter.
- Jack Kirby introduces his Fourth World series in a number of new DC titles — The Forever People, New Gods, and Mister Miracle — while continuing his run on Superman's Pal Jimmy Olsen. Kirby writes and draws all four titles during the year.
- Early in the year, DC Comics editorial director Carmine Infantino is promoted to publisher.
- Bill Schanes and Steve Schanes co-found Pacific Comics, starting out as a mail-order company selling to consumers via ads in the Comics Buyer's Guide.
- The Air Pirates collective is formed in San Francisco.
- Italian editor Renzo Barbieri launches two new horror-erotic series: Oltretomba (Underworld) and Lucifera.
- Denis Gifford publishes the books Discovering Comics and Stap Me: History of the British Newspaper Strip (1971).
- Ariel Dorfman and Armand Mattelart publish the book How to Read Donald Duck, a critical essay of Disney comics from a Marxist point of view.
- Dutch comic artist Nico van Welzenes publishes his pornographic comics Peter Pik and Superlul.

== Births ==
=== August ===
- August 12: Michel Koeniguer, French comics artist (The Bridge, Bomb Road, Misty Mission, Berlin sera notre tombeau), (d. 2021).

== Deaths ==
=== January ===
- January 17: Oscar Knudsen, Danish illustrator and comics artist, dies at age 72.
- January 27: E. Simms Campbell, American comics artist (Harlem Girls, Cuties), dies at age 65.

=== February ===
- February 18: Walter Booth, British comics artist (Professor Potash), dies at age 81.
- February 24: Jan Bouman, Dutch comics artist and illustrator (Lijntrekker), dies at age 56.
- February 21: Ercüment Kalmik, Turkish painter and comics artist (Çetin Kaptan, a.k.a. Çetinin), dies at age 61 or 62.

=== March ===
- March 10: Ladislaus Kmoch, aka Ludwig Kmoch, Austrian illustrator, cartoonist and comics artist (Tobias Seicherl), dies at age 73.

=== April ===
- April 23: Marius J.G. Thomassen, aka Mathos, Dutch illustrator and comics artist (De Avonturen van Flits, de herder en Bull, de dog), dies at age 81.
- April: David Law, Scottish comics artist (Dennis the Menace and Gnasher, Beryl the Peril, Corporal Clott), dies at age 63.

=== May ===
- May 10: Ted Mathijsen, aka Roberic, Dutch comics artist (Ted Start), dies at age 44.

=== June ===
- June 5: Otto Waffenschmied, German comics artist (Muck und Puck, Max und Miki), dies at age 69.
- June 9: Russell R. Winterbotham, American novelist and comics writer (scripted Red Ryder and Kevin the Bold), dies at age 66.
- June 27: Catrinus Tas, Dutch cartoonist, dies at age 42.
- June: Henri Dimpre, French illustrator and comics artist, dies at age 64.
- June: Carl Rose, aka Earl Cros, American cartoonist (I say it's spinach), illustrator and comics artist (Our New Age), dies at age 68.

=== July ===
- July 2: Art Helfant, American comics artist (Timid Tim, Boitram the Boiglar and Heathcliff the Hobo), dies at age 72 or 73.
- July 7: Ub Iwerks, American animator and comics artist (Mickey Mouse), dies at age 70.
- July 19: Garry Cleveland Myers Sr., American psychologist and comics writer (Goofus and Gallant) and publisher (Highlights for Children), dies at age 87.
- July 24: Lou Fine, American comics artist (worked for Jumbo Comics, Quality Comics), dies at age 56.

=== August ===
- Specific date unknown: Julius Svendsen, Norwegian-American comics artist and animator (Disney comics), dies at age 51 or 52.

=== October ===
- October 22: Cois Cassiers, Belgian comedian, cameraman and comic artist (comics for 't Kapoentje), dies at age
- October 25: Paul Terry, American animator, film director, film producer and comics artist (Have You Seen Alonzo?, Farmer Alfalfa, Mighty Mouse, Heckle and Jeckle), dies at age 84.

=== November ===
- November: Hy Gage, American comics artist (Miss Information), dies at age 93.
- November 28: Vasil Zahariev, Bulgarian painter and comics artist, dies at age 76.

=== December ===
- December 20: Roy Disney, American film producer (Walt Disney Company) and brother of Walt Disney, dies at age 78 from an intracranial hemorrhage.
- December 22: Godfried Bomans, Dutch novelist, columnist and comics writer (De Avonturen van Pa Pinkelman, Dick Parker), dies at age 58 from a heart attack.
- December 23: Gray Croucher, aka Gray, British-Belgian comics artist and illustrator (Rikske en Fikske), dies at age 51.
- December 28: Burt Gillett, American animator and film director (Walt Disney Company, Walter Lantz Productions), dies at age 80 from a heart attack.
- Specific date unknown: Joe Easley, American comics artist and illustrator (Along the Iron Pike), dies at age 87.

=== Specific date unknown ===
- Georges Bourdin, French illustrator and comics artist (L'Histoire de Cochise), dies at age 83 or 84.
- Reg Bunn, British comics artist (The Spider), dies at age 65 or 66.
- Lev Gleason, American comics publisher (Lev Gleason Publications), dies at age 62 or 63.
- James Jewell, Scottish comics artist (Wee Peem), dies at age 73.
- Noé Solano Vargas, Costa Rican comics artist (Candelario), dies at age 71 or 72.

== Exhibitions ==
- April 18–May 2: New York City — first exhibition of comic books
- September 8–November 7: 75 Years of the Comics, New York Cultural Center, New York — curated by Maurice Horn

== Conventions ==
- January 2: Miamicon '71 (Miami, Florida)
- February 27–28: Comicon '71 (British Comic Art Convention) (Waverley Hotel, London, England) — organized by Bram Stokes and Dez Skinn; guest of honor: Frank Bellamy; other guests include Frank Dickens, Mick Farren, and Edward Barker
- Summer: Name TK (Boston, Massachusetts)
- June 17–20: Houstoncon '71 (Houston, Texas) — official guests include Kirk Alyn at his first fan convention
- July 2–4: Comic Art Convention (Statler Hilton Hotel, New York City) — presentation of the Goethe Awards, emceed by Tony Isabella and Carl Gafford. Convention credited by Will Eisner for his return to comics:

I came back into the field because of [convention organizer Phil Seuling]. I remember [him] calling me in New London, [Connecticut], where I was sitting there as chairman of the board of Croft Publishing Co. My secretary said, 'There's a Mr. Seuling on the phone and he's talking about a comics convention. What is that?' She said, 'I didn't know you were a cartoonist, Mr. Eisner.' 'Oh, yes,' I said, 'secretly; I'm a closet cartoonist.' I came down and was stunned at the existence of the whole world. ... That was a world that I had left, and I found it very exciting, very stimulating".

- July 8–11: D-Con '71 (Sheraton-Dallas Hotel, Dallas, Texas) — 6th annual Southwesterncon; guest of honor: Robert Bloch
- August 6–8: Golden State Comic Con (e.g., the second occurrence of what becomes San Diego Comic-Con) (Muir College, University of California, San Diego Campus, La Jolla, California) — official guests: Kirk Alyn, Leigh Brackett, Ray Bradbury, Edmund Hamilton, Jack Kirby
- August 14–15: Metro Con (Statler Hotel, Springfield, Virginia) — second annual show organized by 16-year-old Gary Groth; attendees include guest of honor Frank Frazetta, Phil Seuling, Bud Plant, Dave Cockrum, Dennis O'Neil, Ted White, Len Wein, Mark Hanerfeld, Marv Wolfman, and Gerry Conway
- August 20-21: Miamicon II (Miami, Florida)
- October 29–November 1: Salone Internazionale dei Comics a.k.a. "Lucca 7" (Lucca, Italy) — festival expands to four days
- November 26–28: Creation Con (New Yorker Hotel, New York City) — first iteration of this trade show, produced by two 14-year-old Queens schoolboys, Adam Malin and Gary Berman; guest: Jim Steranko

== Awards ==
=== Goethe Awards ===
Presented July 3, 1972, (for comics published in 1971) at the Comic Art Convention, New York City in a ceremony emceed by Tony Isabella and Carl Gafford. The Goethe Award ballot was initially published in The Buyer's Guide to Comics Fandom, The Monster Times, and Graphic Story World. Nominations were sent in from 335 readers. Ultimately, there were 7 categories with 4-7 nominees in each category. 700 fans voted for the final nominees. The award results were also published in Comic Art News & Reviews.

- Favorite Artist: TK
- Favorite Writer: TK
- Favorite Editor: TK
- Favorite Comic Book: TK
- Favorite Comic-Book Story: TK
- Favorite Comic-Book Character: TK
- Favorite Fanzine: The Buyer's Guide to Comics Fandom
- Favorite Fan Writer: Tony Isabella

=== Shazam Awards ===
Presented in 1972 for comics published in 1971:

- Best Continuing Feature: Conan the Barbarian (Marvel)
- Best Individual Story: "Snowbirds Don't Fly", by Dennis O'Neil and Neal Adams, Green Lantern/Green Arrow #85 (DC)
- Best Writer (Dramatic Division): Roy Thomas
- Best Penciller (Dramatic Division): Neal Adams
- Best Inker (Dramatic Division): Dick Giordano
- Best Writer (Humor Division): John Albano
- Best Penciller (Humor Division): Dan DeCarlo
- Best Inker (Humor Division): Henry Scarpelli
- Best Letterer: Gaspar Saladino
- Best Colorist: Tatjana Wood
- Best Foreign Artist: Frank Bellamy
- Outstanding New Talent: (tie)
  - Michael Kaluta
  - Richard Corben
- Special Recognition: Gil Kane, "for Blackmark, his paperback comics novel"
- Special Achievement by an Individual: Jack Kirby, "for his Fourth World series in Forever People, New Gods, Mister Miracle, Jimmy Olsen"
- Hall of Fame: Will Eisner

== First issues by title ==
=== Charlton Comics ===
Ghost Manor vol. 2

Release: October Editor: Sal Gentile.

Ghostly Haunts

Release: September Editor: Sal Gentile.

Haunted

Release: September Editor: Sal Gentile.

=== DC Comics ===
Dark Mansion of Forbidden Love

Release: February /March Editor: Dorothy Woolfolk. Artist: Tony DeZuniga.

DC 100 Page Super Spectacular: debuts with issue #4

Release: September /October Editor: Joe Orlando.

Forever People

Release: February /March Writer/Artist: Jack Kirby.

Ghosts

Release: September /October Editor: Murray Boltinoff.

Mister Miracle

Release: April. Writer/Artist: Jack Kirby.

New Gods

Release: February /March Writer/Artist: Jack Kirby.

Weird War Tales

Release: September /October Editor: Joe Kubert.

=== Marvel Comics ===
Kull the Conqueror

Release: June. Writer: Roy Thomas. Artists: Ross Andru and Wally Wood.

Marvel Feature

Release: December. Writer: Roy Thomas. Artists: Ross Andru and Bill Everett.

Marvel Spotlight

Release: November. Writer: Gardner Fox. Artists: Syd Shores and Wally Wood.

Savage Tales

Release: May by Curtis Magazines. Editor: Stan Lee.

=== Independent titles ===
Air Pirates Funnies

Release: July by Last Gasp's imprint "Hell Comics".

Countdown

Release: February 20 by Polystyle Publications.

The Fabulous Furry Freak Brothers

Release: February by Rip Off Press. Writer/Artist: Gilbert Shelton.

Mickey Rat

Release: December by Los Angeles Comic Book Company. Writer/Artist: Robert Armstrong.

Tammy

Release: February 6 by IPC Magazines.

== Initial appearance by character name ==
=== DC Comics ===
- Big Barda in Mister Miracle #4 (October)
- Bruno Mannheim in Superman's Pal, Jimmy Olsen #139 (July)
- Black Racer in New Gods #3 (July)
- Champions of Angor in Justice League of America #87 (February)
  - Blue Jay
  - Silver Sorceress
- DeSaad in Forever People #2 (May)
- Doctor Bedlam in Mister Miracle #2 (May/June)
- Dubbilex in Superman's Pal, Jimmy Olsen #136 (March)
- Forever People in Forever People #1 (March)
- Glorious Godfrey in Forever People #3 (June)
- Gnarrk in Teen Titans #33 (June)
- Granny Goodness in Mister Miracle #2 (May/June)
- Highfather in New Gods #1 (February /March)
- Infinity-Man in Forever People #1 (March)
- John Stewart in Green Lantern #87 (December)
- Kalibak in New Gods #1 (February/March)
- Lightray in New Gods #1 (February/March)
- Mantis in Forever People #2 (June)
- Merlyn in Justice League of America #94 (November)
- Metron in New Gods #1 (February/March)
- Mister Miracle in Mister Miracle #1 (April)
- Oberon in Mister Miracle #1 (April)
- Orion in New Gods #1 (February/March)
- Ra's al Ghul in Batman #232 (June)
- Sonny Sumo in Forever People #4 (September)
- Swamp Thing in House of Secrets #92 (July)
- Talia al Ghul in Detective Comics #411 (May)
- Virman Vundabar in Mister Miracle #5 (December)

=== Marvel Comics ===
- Defenders in Marvel Feature #1 (December)
- Doc Samson in The Incredible Hulk #141 (July)
- Jarella in The Incredible Hulk #140 (June)
- Man-Thing in Savage Tales #1 (May)
- Mockingbird in Astonishing Tales #6 (June)
- Morbius in The Amazing Spider-Man #101 (October)
- Overmind in Fantastic Four #113 (August)
- Serpent Men in Kull the Conqueror #2 (September)
- Spymaster in Iron Man #33
- Squadron Supreme in The Avengers #85 (March)
  - Blue Eagle
  - Doctor Spectrum
  - Golden Archer
  - Hyperion
  - Lady Lark
  - Nighthawk
  - Tom Thumb
  - Whizzer
- Valkyrie (Samantha Parrington) in The Incredible Hulk #142 (August)

=== Independent titles ===
- Dirty Duck in Air Pirates Funnies #1 (July, Last Gasp)
- Yama in Il figlio di Mefisto (March, Bonelli)
- Zippy the Pinhead in Real Pulp Comix #1 (March, Print Mint)
