= Quarmer =

Character from DC Comics

Publication information
- Publisher: DC Comics
- First appearance: Superman #233 (January 1971)
- Created by: Dennis O'Neil; Curt Swan (based upon Superman by Jerry Siegel and Joe Shuster)

In-story information
- Place of origin: Quarrm Dimension
- Notable aliases: Sand Superman
- Abilities: Can drain the powers and abilities of Superman

Quarmer, a.k.a. the Sand Superman, is a character from DC Comics, created by Dennis O'Neil and Curt Swan. It is a living sand doppelgänger of Superman and first appeared in Superman #233 (January 1971) in "The Sandman Saga", the first issue that introduced the Bronze Age Superman.

== Fictional character biography ==
Somewhere in the deserts of the United States there was a reactor in which experiments were conducted on kryptonite. When a powerful nuclear meltdown happens at the reactor, Superman stops the radiation from spreading, but is knocked unconscious by an explosion. A fission wave reaches around the world and transforms all kryptonite into pure iron, leaving Superman with no apparent weaknesses.

The explosion also opens up a portal into another dimension called the Quarrm Dimension, inhabited by non-corporeal spirits. One of the beings of this dimension gains access to the ordinary DC Earth by attaching itself to the psychic and physical imprint of Superman left in the sand. Many hours after the explosion, the spirit manifests as a sand-based clone of Superman.

This being would in the months that followed meet Superman seemingly randomly and drain power from him in an attempt to create an identity for itself. Superman was left near powerless after each such encounter, while the Sand Superman grew more powerful and humanoid. I Ching sends away Superman's soul to regain all the powers he had lost, leaving the Sand Superman powerless and near dead. Attempting to return home to Quarrm in order to survive, the Sand Superman opens up a dimensional portal in a park in Metropolis. Superman had, unfortunately, been given brain damage by a powerful blow to his head during the time that he had no powers. When his powers return, Superman retains brain damage, which makes him act rashly and unreasonably.

Another being from Quarrm enters Earth via Quarmer's portal and fuses with a giant Chinese statue of a monster. Superman accidentally flies over the creature and is completely drained of power. Quarmer and Superman manage to fend off the monster, who retreats to its dimension. Alone again with Superman, Quarmer announces its intent to kill and replace Superman. I Ching arrives and hypnotizes the two, making them see that their fight would end up destroying Earth. The Sand Superman realized that it had no right to claim Superman's body or soul and agrees to return home to Quarrm. It leaves through the portal with half of Superman's powers; Superman refuses to take the other half back after having seen the destruction of Earth during the hypnotism.

== Powers and abilities ==
The Quarmer could drain and make use of Superman's powers, gradually becoming a Superman clone. He also could sense the whereabouts of Superman.
