= The Sandman Saga (Superman) =

Superman comic book story arc

- Cover of Superman vol. #233, Jan. 1971, art by Neal Adams
- Publisher: DC Comics
- Publication date: January – September 1971
- Genre: Superhero
- Title(s): Superman #233–235, 237–238, 240–242
- Main character: Superman

Creative team
- Writer: Dennis O'Neil
- Penciller: Curt Swan
- Inker: Murphy Anderson
- Editor: Julius Schwartz

"The Sandman Saga" is a Superman story arc published in 1971 in Superman #233–235, 237–238 and 240–242. This is the first Superman storyline under editor Julius Schwartz and the first Bronze Age-era Superman story.

== History ==
In 1971, DC attempted to revamp and streamline the Superman universe, significantly reducing Superman's powers so that he was no longer a god-like character who was impossible to beat.

Many of the concepts introduced during this time, such as a powered-down Superman, Intergang, Project Cadmus, the Guardian, and Darkseid, would later be used in the post-Crisis incarnation of Superman that first appeared in John Byrne's The Man of Steel.

Mort Weisinger, the editor on the Superman titles, retired from his 30-year career at DC at the end of 1970. As he had been a prolific editor, DC replaced Weisinger with four people: Mike Sekowsky (Adventure Comics and Supergirl), Murray Boltinoff (Superboy, Action Comics and Superman's Pal Jimmy Olsen), E. Nelson Bridwell (Superman's Girl Friend, Lois Lane) and Julius Schwartz (World's Finest and Superman). The new editors streamlined the Superman mythos: things like kryptonite, imaginary stories, Mister Mxyzptlk, Bizarro, Krypto the Superdog, Jimmy Olsen's Elastic Lad stories, Lana Lang's Insect Queen stories and Titano the Super-Ape would all be removed and forgotten.

After a series of house ads including two-page center-spreads, DC published Superman #233 in January 1971. With the tagline The Amazing New Adventures of above the Superman title, and the displayed "1" which was actually part of the slogan "Number 1 Best-Selling Comics Magazine", it led some to believe that the book was actually called The Amazing New Adventures of Superman #1. Writer Dennis O'Neil, known from his work on Batman and Green Lantern/Green Arrow, and artists Curt Swan and Murphy Anderson began the "Sandman Saga" in this issue. The story opens with a scientist attempting to create an engine powered by kryptonite and inadvertently transforming all kryptonite on Earth into harmless iron. The same incident opens a portal to another dimension, releasing a spirit called Quarmer which transforms itself into a sand-based clone of Superman. Following this development, Clark Kent is reassigned by his new boss, Morgan Edge, as a television reporter of WGBS, and O'Neil dumps the wimpy-Clark Kent persona.

== Aftermath ==
After the conclusion of the storyline, DC pulled the plug on this "new" incarnation and Cary Bates came in to script Superman #243. It is possible that DC was competing with its past and followed the advice of those fans who were more interested in seeing cosmic conflicts. While the "new" Superman still occasionally popped up, O'Neil's vision of Superman disappeared after the final "Sandman Saga" issue. In 1992, Walt Simonson wrote and drew a post-Crisis version of the "Sandman Saga" in Superman Special #1.

== Collection ==
In January 2009, the storyline was collected as Volume 1 of the DC Comics Classics Library and titled Superman: Kryptonite Nevermore (ISBN 978-1401220853). It was later reprinted as a stand-alone trade paperback in 2012 (ISBN 978-1401234782) and a 50th anniversary hardcover edition in 2021 (ISBN 978-1779507525). A volume of DC Finest containing the story was released in 2025 (ISBN 978-1799501657).
