= Green Goblin Reborn! =

Marvel Comics storyline

- The Amazing Spider-Man #96 (May 1971), cover art by Gil Kane.
- Publisher: Marvel Comics
- Publication date: May – July 1971
- Genre: Superhero
- Title(s): The Amazing Spider-Man #96–98
- Main characters: Spider-Man; Green Goblin; Harry Osborn

Creative team
- Writer: Stan Lee
- Artists: Gil Kane; John Romita Sr.; Frank Giacoia

"Green Goblin Reborn!" is a 1971 comic book story arc published by Marvel Comics in The Amazing Spider-Man #96–98. It was written by Stan Lee and illustrated by Gil Kane, John Romita Sr., and Frank Giacoia. The story follows the superhero Spider-Man fighting against his arch enemy, the Green Goblin, while his best friend Harry Osborn begins abusing drugs. Lee wrote "Green Goblin Reborn!" after the Department of Health, Education and Welfare contacted Marvel Comics about doing an anti-drug story. The Comics Code Authority (CCA), the industry's regulatory body, refused to approve the story's sale because of a strict rule against depiction of drug use. Marvel Comics published the story and retailers carried it, ignoring the lack of approval, prompting the CCA to loosen its restrictions for future publications. The story was well-received and brought positive press coverage to Marvel Comics.

== Plot ==
The Amazing Spider-Man #96: "And Now, The Goblin" begins with Peter Parker, the superhero Spider-Man, reminiscing on Norman Osborn, the father of his best friend Harry Osborn. Norman is secretly a supervillain called the Green Goblin and, prior to developing amnesia, was the only person who knew Spider-Man's secret identity. While patrolling the city as Spider-Man, Peter sees a drug-addled boy who believes he can fly. The boy jumps but Spider-Man catches him. The police provide aid while Spider-Man, currently a wanted fugitive, flees. After his patrol, Peter meets with Harry, Norman, and their other friends Mary Jane Watson and Randy Robertson to watch Mary Jane perform in a play. Randy, having seen the drug-addled boy earlier in the day, starts an argument with Norman about how he should use his influence as a wealthy businessman to fight drug abuse. After the show, Norman has a strong impulse to break into a locked room; there, he finds hidden Green Goblin equipment and regains his memories. Peter investigates when his spider sense warns him of danger, and he finds the Green Goblin.

The Amazing Spider-Man #97: "In the Grip of the Goblin!" continues the confrontation between Spider-Man and the Green Goblin. Spider-Man is conflicted about fighting Norman, who then wins the fight and flies away, believing he killed Spider-Man. Unbeknownst to Norman, Spider-Man had caught himself on a ledge during his fall and was uninjured. Peter returns to his and Harry's apartment, where Harry is bitter because he thought Peter was flirting with Mary Jane. To Peter's shock, Harry takes some pills and goes to sleep. The next day, Harry sees Mary Jane spending time with Peter. A drug dealer notices Harry's despair and takes advantage of it to sell him drugs. Peter tries without success to track down Norman; when he returns to his apartment he finds that Harry has overdosed and that the Green Goblin has arrived.

The Amazing Spider-Man #98: "The Goblin's Last Gasp!" begins with the Green Goblin crashing into Peter and Harry's apartment. Peter shows him that Harry is overdosing. The Green Goblin is unable to withstand memories of Norman's life and flees while Peter gets Harry to the hospital. In London, Peter's estranged girlfriend Gwen Stacy regrets leaving him and decides to return home. The drug dealer approaches Peter and asks him where Harry is; enraged, Peter beats up the dealer and his friends. Meanwhile, newspaper editor J. Jonah Jameson is afraid to report on Harry's overdose because Norman is a major advertiser for the paper. His employee Robbie Robertson scolds him for compromising his integrity and convinces him to change his mind. Spider-Man continues his search for the Green Goblin; upon finding him, they engage in another fight, which continues until Spider-Man leads the Goblin to the hospital to show him Harry's current state. The shock causes Norman to faint; Spider-Man takes him home as the amnesia sets back in. Peter then reunites with Gwen as she arrives home.

== Creation and publication ==
The Amazing Spider-Man #97 features an image of Harry Osborn swarmed by pills to depict his drug abuse.

"Green Goblin Reborn!" is a comic book story arc written by Stan Lee featuring the Marvel Comics character Spider-Man. It was published by Marvel Comics in 1971 across issues #96–98 of The Amazing Spider-Man, the most popular Marvel Comics publication at the time. Issue #96 was illustrated by Gil Kane and John Romita Sr., while the following two issues were illustrated by Kane and Frank Giacoia.

In 1970, the Department of Health, Education and Welfare of the Nixon administration asked Marvel Comics to publish a story about the dangers of drug use. Lee and Romita shared the concern about youth drug culture and wanted to help discourage drug use. The Amazing Spider-Man provided an opportunity to reach college students as the series was popular among the demographic, and Spider-Man was seen as a counter-cultural figure. Lee and his publisher Martin Goodman chose to run the anti-drug story in The Amazing Spider-Man, leading Lee to write "Green Goblin Reborn!".

Acknowledging that young readers do not like being lectured to, Lee wrote the story intending to focus on the entertainment value and avoid preaching. Romita later said he had trouble developing the story because he was "a little bit of a square" and had never used drugs. To portray Harry's unpleasant experience with drugs, Kane drew a collage in which Harry was swarmed by pills. The original cover of issue #97 featured a similar image, but it was replaced by a more typical cover featuring Spider-Man and the Green Goblin.

The staff at Marvel Comics worried that the Comics Code Authority (CCA), a regulatory body within the industry, would take issue with the story because it depicted drug use. Lee appealed to the CCA, prompting a rare meeting between the publishers of the Comics Magazine Association of America that oversaw it. After review, the CCA stood by its decision that depicting drug use was "immoral" and refused to approve the story's publication. The final decision to reject the story was made by Archie Comics publisher John L. Goldwater, as CCA administrator Leonard Darvin was unavailable.

Publication without approval from the CCA presented the risk that Marvel Comics could be expelled from the Comics Magazine Association of America, which would pressure sellers to stop carrying any publications by the company. Lee had previously worked with Chip Goodman to urge the CCA to allow the depiction of narcotics, but it voted against the proposal.

Lee recalled in a 1998 interview:

I could understand them; they were like lawyers, people who take things literally and technically. The Code mentioned that you mustn't mention drugs and, according to their rules, they were right. So I didn't even get mad at them then. I said, 'Screw it' and just took the Code seal off for those three issues. Then we went back to the Code again. I never thought about the Code when I was writing a story, because basically I never wanted to do anything that was to my mind too violent or too sexy. I was aware that young people were reading these books, and had there not been a Code, I don't think that I would have done the stories any differently.

Despite the risks, Lee received permission from his publisher Martin Goodman to release the story. By 1971, the CCA had lost some of its influence and retailers were willing to ignore the lack of CCA approval for the story arc. The Amazing Spider-Man #96 was the first issue of a major comic series to be sold without CCA approval since the organization's inception in 1954.

== Themes ==
"Green Goblin Reborn!" conveys an anti-drug message by depicting negative effects of drug use, showing that it can cause psychosis, overdose, and reckless life-threatening behavior. The story depicts Harry as falling into drug use because of pressures in every aspect of his life, while his father, the Green Goblin, uses a drug to gain superhuman powers at the cost of his sanity. The story never names the drug Harry uses.

The first issue of the story challenges the idea that law enforcement is unjust. It depicts police officers saving the life of a drug addict while refusing to pursue Spider-Man, who was considered a fugitive at the time, because they saw him save a life.

The story features a moment when J. Jonah Jameson, typically an adversarial character, makes a principled decision at the expense of his newspaper's profits. Jameson's willingness to publish a story despite the risk of losing advertising income mirrors Lee's own decision to publish "Green Goblin Reborn!" despite the associated risks.

The responsibility to do good when one is able is a recurring theme in Spider-Man stories, a theme associated with the series' motto "with great power comes great responsibility". Using the character to push for social change reflects this philosophy. Within the story, this sentiment is expressed when Peter Parker's friend demands that Norman Osborn use his own wealth and influence to combat drug use.

== Reception and legacy ==
"Green Goblin Reborn!" was highly regarded by readers. Upon its publication, the story (and Lee himself) received positive media attention. Marvel Comics editor-in-chief Joe Quesada was introduced to comic books through "Green Goblin Reborn!" as a child after his father bought the comics to teach him about the dangers of drug use. Quesada was later responsible for ending Marvel Comics' participation in the Comics Code Authority.

The story is recognized for contributing to a shift in how stories are told in superhero comics, especially in their depiction of crime. After outlets stocked The Amazing Spider-Man #96 despite the lack of CCA certification, the CCA held a meeting and decided to loosen its restrictions. Under the new rules, illicit drug use could be depicted so long as it was portrayed as "a vicious habit" and avoided any positive connotations. A few months after "Green Goblin Returns!", DC Comics published the "Snowbirds Don't Fly" story in Green Lantern/Green Arrow, in which Green Arrow's sidekick Speedy is addicted to heroin. The CCA approved the story. Restrictions were also loosened for horror comics, allowing Marvel Comics to publish series like Werewolf by Night and The Tomb of Dracula. Lee reflected positively on the effect of "Green Goblin Reborn!" later in his life, saying that it "finally gave the publishers the gumption to stand up to any critics when their objections were nonsensical".

"Green Goblin Reborn!" was one of three stories republished in the 1979 The Amazing Spider-Man collection. It was later republished in Essential Spider-Man Vol. 5, which collected issues #90–113.
