= De Generaal =

Dutch comic strip

De Generaal (The General) is a Dutch comic strip by Peter de Smet (1944-2003); it was published from 1971 until 1997 in Pep and succeeding magazines, notably Eppo. Each story consists of three or four pages and is based on running gags.

== Background ==
The protagonist is a general obsessed with seizing power by chasing the marshal out of his fortress. He attempts to do so by using strategy or brute force, but his failures put him behind bars at the otherwise disused fortress. The general gets assisted by a professor who makes up a plan or invents a new machine to make the attempt a success, and a soldier who drives the general to the fortress to execute the plan. The soldier is vocal about his reluctance which puts him often at odds with the general. The characters are usually anonymous, only in one story it transpires that the general's forenames are Jozef Maria Ignatius.

The stories are set on an open field in a parallel version of the Netherlands which in reality has generals but no marshals. The drive from the tree, where the general lives with his pet duckling, to the fortress is lightened up by a revolving host of supporting characters; some of them have religious backgrounds, like the pastor who relies on the importance "chewing your sandwiches well" (Dutch slang for sandwiches: bammetjes) or the gospel-spreading samba-percussionist and his fellow convert. The most notorious character is the police scout who has his own ambitions to fulfill; receiving the Honorary Brass Whistle. He thinks that fining the general will help him achieve his goal, but instead he drifts further away from it; his motorbike gets trashed while his boss relegates him to cleaning jobs of even greater disaster.

=== Alternative endings ===
- Sometimes the general escapes prison because the fortress is abandoned (which makes the attempt invalid) or because his disguise is unrecognisable to the extent that he's refused entry.
- In one story, mainly drawn in black-and-white, the general manages to overthrow the marshal by driving a supertank. This turns out to be a movie especially made to keep the general's spirits high.

=== Tribute ===
The 16-2013-issue of Eppo published a Pep-special which included a tribute-story by Mars Gremmen.

== Links ==
De Generaal

De Smet's biography in Comiclopedia
