= Michel Koeniguer =

French comic book artist (1971–2021)

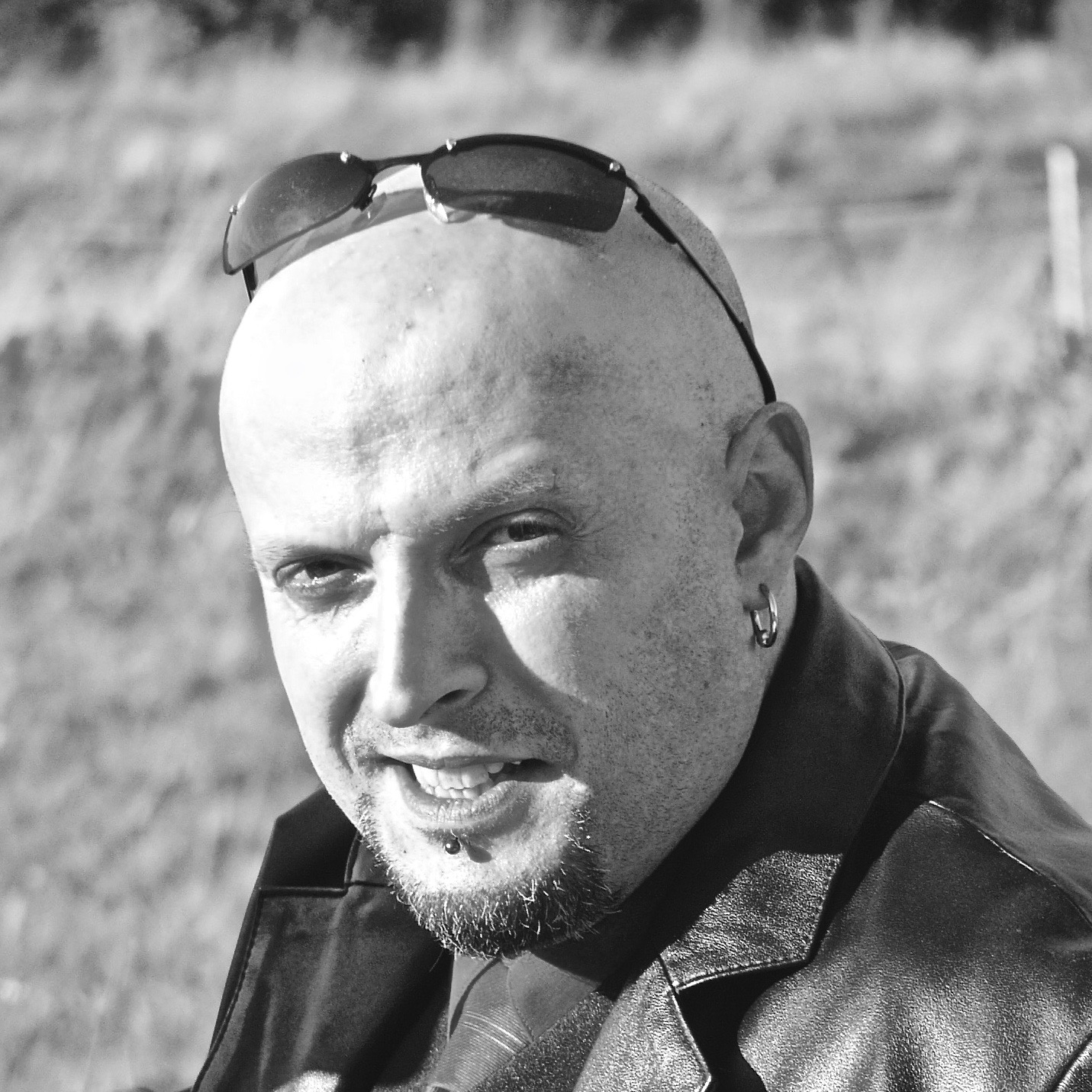
- Michel Koeniguer in September 2004
- Born: 12 August 1971; Schirmeck, Bas-Rhin, France
- Died: 6 April 2021 (aged 49); Colmar
- Occupation: Comic Book Artist
- Known for: historical Comicbook Author

Michel Koeniguer (12 August 1971 – 6 April 2021) was a French comic book artist.

== Biography ==
Koeniguer was born on 12 August 1971 near Strasbourg. In the 1990s, he attended the École supérieure des arts décoratifs de Strasbourg and the University of Strasbourg. He made his comic debut in 2002 with his illustration of Les Derniers Seigneurs, the first book in the Bushido, published in 2002 by Éditions Pointe Noire. With Pointe Noire filing for bankruptcy, the second book in the series, Gaïjin-San, was published by Éditions Paquet in 2003, the beginning of a fruitful collaboration between the artist and the publisher.

Koeniguer worked on the Brooklyn 62nd trilogy from 2005 to 2007 following the conclusion of Bushido. He then covered the Iraq War with the series The Bridge and the Vietnam War with the Bomb road and Misty Mission trilogies.

Michel Koeniguer died after a long illness and several surgeries on 6 April 2021 at the age of 49.

In the last months of his lifetime, Michel Koeniguer left finished the first 20 pages of Les Derniers Païens (third and last volume of Berlin sera notre tombeau), but also the script as well as the complete storyboards. This allowed comic artist Vincenzo Giordano to draw pages 21 to 48. This third and final volume was finally published posthumously in April 2022, one year after Koeniguer's death.

== Published albums ==
- Berlin sera notre tombeau
  - Neukölln (2019)
  - Furia Francese (2020)
  - Les Derniers Païens (2022, pages 21 to 48 drawn by Vincenzo Giordano)
- Bomb Road
  - Da Nang (2010)
  - Chu Laï (2011)
  - Yankee station (2012)
- The Bridge (2008)
- Brooklyn 62nd
  - Latinos Requiem (2005)
  - Gangsta Rhaposdy (2006)
  - Hardcore Cop (2007)
- Bushido
  - Les Derniers Seigneurs (2002)
  - Gaïjin-San (2003)
  - La mort des guerriers (2004)
- Eightball hunter
  - Loser (2010)
  - Winner (2013)
  - Intégrale : Eightball hunter (2018)
- Misty Mission
  - Sur la Terre comme au ciel (2016)
  - En enfer comme au paradis (2017)
  - Des ténèbres au purgatoire (2018)
  - Intégrale : Misty Mission (2019)
