= Peter de Smet =

Dutch comic-strip artist

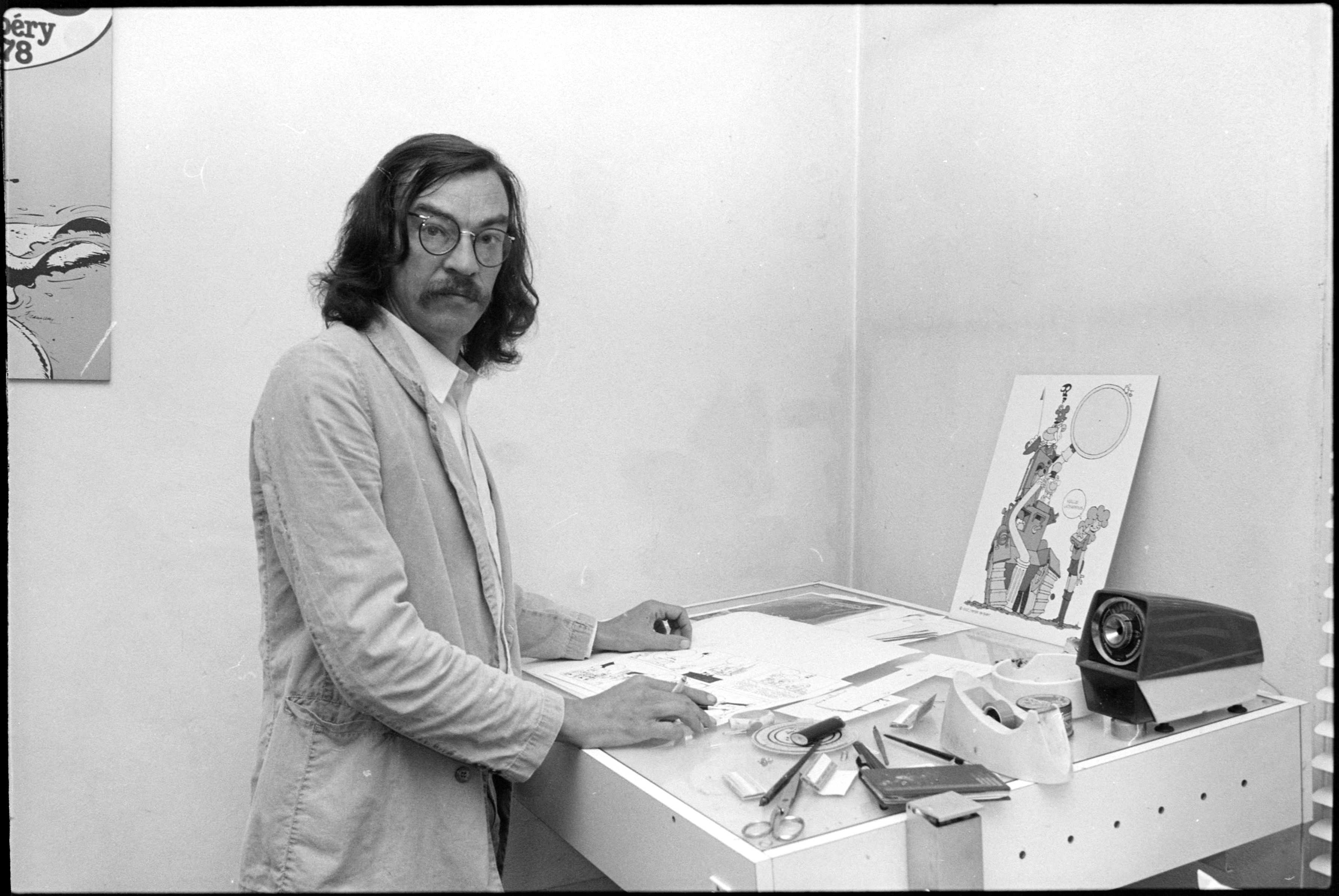
- Born: July 4, 1944; Amsterdam
- Died: January 6, 2003 (aged 58); Amsterdam
- Occupation: Comics artist
- Years active: 1969–1998
- Notable work: De Generaal

Peter de Smet (4 July 1944, Amsterdam – 6 January 2003, Amsterdam) was a Dutch comic-strip artist. He was the author of De Generaal ("The General").

From the 1960s onwards de Smet worked as an artist in advertising and started drawing comics in the same time. An early version of De Generaal was sold to Tintin but was never published. In 1968 de Smet started his series Fulco set in medieval times for the magazine 't Kapoentje but had to give up due to illness. In the following period, de Smet returned to advertising with strips like Pieter Pienter for a bank, which was published in magazines like Tina and Donald Duck.

In 1971 Pep magazine picked up De Generaal, and published it through several incarnations of the magazine, notably Eppo.

== Bibliography ==
Works by Peter de Smet:

- Fulco (1969)
- De Generaal (1971-1997) - 14 albums
- Joris PK (1972-1986)
- Fiedel (1974)
- Het Hopmysterie (1974)
- Kasper Krispijn - Het Goud van de H.M.S. Cornwall (1976-1977)
- Zapapa y la Revolución (1977)
- Le Cuirassé Honneur et Patrie (1977-1979)
- Otto, Olivier en Oscar (1981, 1983)
- Anno 3000... en nog wat (1982)
- De Bevrijders (1984)
- Morgenster en Durandel (1984-1985)
- Lodewijk (1986-1990)
- Rat en Wezel (1988-1989)
- Viva Zapapa! (1989-1992) - 2 albums
- De Meester - Overpeinzingen van een vlakgom (1990-1991, 1994-1998)
