= Snowbirds Don't Fly =

Comic book story arc

"Snowbirds Don't Fly" "They Say It'll Kill Me... But They Won't Say When"
- Cover of Green Lantern/Green Arrow #85 (Aug./Sept. 1971), showing Roy "Speedy" Harper (m.) preparing to shoot heroin in front of a shocked Hal Jordan (l.) and his guardian Green Arrow (r.). Art by Neal Adams and Dick Giordano.
- Publisher: DC Comics
- Publication date: August/September – October/November 1971
- Genre: Superhero
- Title(s): Green Lantern/Green Arrow #85–86
- Main character(s): Hal Jordan; Green Arrow; Speedy; Black Canary

Creative team
- Writer: Dennis O'Neil
- Penciller: Neal Adams
- Inker(s): Neal Adams, Dick Giordano
- Editor: Julius Schwartz

"Snowbirds Don't Fly" is a two-part anti-drug comic book story arc which appeared in Green Lantern/Green Arrow issues 85 and 86, published by DC Comics in 1971. The story was written by Dennis O'Neil and Neal Adams, with the latter also providing the art with Dick Giordano. It tells the story of Green Lantern and Green Arrow, who fight drug dealers, witnessing that Green Arrow's ward Roy Harper is a drug addict and dealing with the fallout of his revelation. Considered a watershed moment in the depiction of mature themes in DC Comics, the theme of this story is set in the tagline on the cover: "DC attacks youth's greatest problem... drugs!"

== Plot ==
In the first part (Green Lantern/Green Arrow #85), Green Arrow (Oliver Queen) runs into muggers who shoot him with a crossbow. Strangely, the weapon is loaded with his arrows. Tracking down the attackers, Green Arrow and his best friend, Green Lantern Hal Jordan, find out that the muggers are addicts who need money, and are surprised to find Queen's ward Speedy (Roy Harper) among them. They think he is working undercover to bust them, but Queen catches him red-handed when he tries to shoot heroin. It becomes evident that the stolen arrows are Queen's, which he shares with Harper when they fight crime together. In the second part (Green Lantern/Green Arrow #86), Green Arrow lashes out at Harper, who withdraws cold turkey out of shame. Queen and Lantern tackle the kingpin of the drug ring, a pharmaceutics CEO who condemns drug abuse, and attend the funeral of a separate addict who died.

== Background ==
During the 1960s, Green Lantern was on the verge of cancellation, which gave writer Denny O'Neil a great deal of creative freedom when he was assigned the series. O'Neil recounted that "my journalism background and laid-back social activism had led me to wonder if I couldn't combine those things with what I did for a living. ... So this was my chance to see if this idea I had would work. It was a situation where nobody had anything to lose. And I think that writing about things that really concerned me pulled out of me a higher level of craft. Also, it gave me real problems to solve in terms of craft which I hadn't faced before." The first of these "socially motivated" Green Lantern/Green Arrow stories was written with Gil Kane slated to be the artist, but Kane dropped out and was replaced by Neal Adams.

The O'Neil/Adams run met with a high level of media attention and critical acclaim including five Shazam Awards at the May 1971 ceremony, but by the time of "Snowbirds Don't Fly", Adams felt that they had run out of steam and were producing stories which lacked true relevance. He responded by pushing for a story dealing with drug addiction, an issue both he and O'Neill had been wanting to tackle, and had encountered firsthand: Adams was chairman of his neighborhood drug rehabilitation center, and O'Neil lived in a neighborhood with a large number of addicts. O'Neil recounted, "I saw people nodding out from heroin every day on the street. I had friends with drug problems, people coming over at 3 a.m. with the shakes." When Adams first drew the cover showing Speedy with heroin paraphernalia, editor Julius Schwartz rejected it, since it would not have been approved by the Comics Code Authority. (The Comics Code prohibited the depiction of drug abuse, even in a totally condemning context.) O'Neil said that Schwartz "was very supportive" during his run on Green Lantern, and that he found the Comics Code to be his biggest restriction when confronting social issues.

Then, Amazing Spider-Man #96–98 (May–July 1971) was published by rival publisher Marvel Comics, which showed major supporting character Harry Osborn struggling with drug addiction. It was the first comic from a major publisher to be published without the Comics Code Authority's seal of approval since 1954, when the Comics Code Authority was founded. Adams said: "We could have done it first and been the ones to make a big move. Popping a pill and walking off a roof isn't the sort of thing that really happens [referring to a scene in Amazing Spider-Man #96], but heroin addiction is; to have it happen to one of our heroes was potentially devastating. Anyway, the publishers at DC, Marvel and the rest called a meeting, and in three weeks, the Comics Code was completely rewritten. And we did our story."

Questioned why Roy Harper (Speedy) was chosen to illustrate drug abuse, O'Neil said that "We chose Roy [Harper] for maximum emotional impact. We thought an established good guy in the throes of addiction would be stronger than we... some character we'd have made up for the occasion. Also, we wanted to show that addiction was not limited to 'bad' or 'misguided' kids."

O'Neil's original ending to the story had Speedy overcoming his drug habit on his own and reconciling with Green Arrow. Adams protested that this ending was too anticlimactic. When O'Neil said he disagreed, Adams scripted two new pages on his own and showed them to Schwartz. Schwartz approved of Adams's revision and had it published instead of O'Neil's ending. In a 1975 article for The Amazing World of DC Comics, O'Neil stated that he still felt Adams's conclusion was not as good as the original ending: "I disapprove of the implied conclusion of that story. What’s implied is that a punch in the mouth solves everything."

== Awards and recognition ==
The "Snowbirds Don't Fly" arc won the 1971 Shazam Award for "Best Individual Story". New York Mayor John Lindsay wrote a letter to DC in response to the matter, commending them, which was printed in issue #86. In 2004, Comic Book Resources author Jonah Weiland called "Snowbirds Don't Fly" the start of an era of socially relevant Green Lantern/Green Arrow comics, a slant which eventually opened up the DC world to other minorities (such as homosexual characters) and climaxed in the character of Mia Dearden, who is not only a victim of child prostitution but also later portrayed as HIV positive. Despite this, she is explicitly portrayed as a positive, pro-active hero by writer Judd Winick.
