= Dennis O'Neil =

American comics writer (1939–2020)

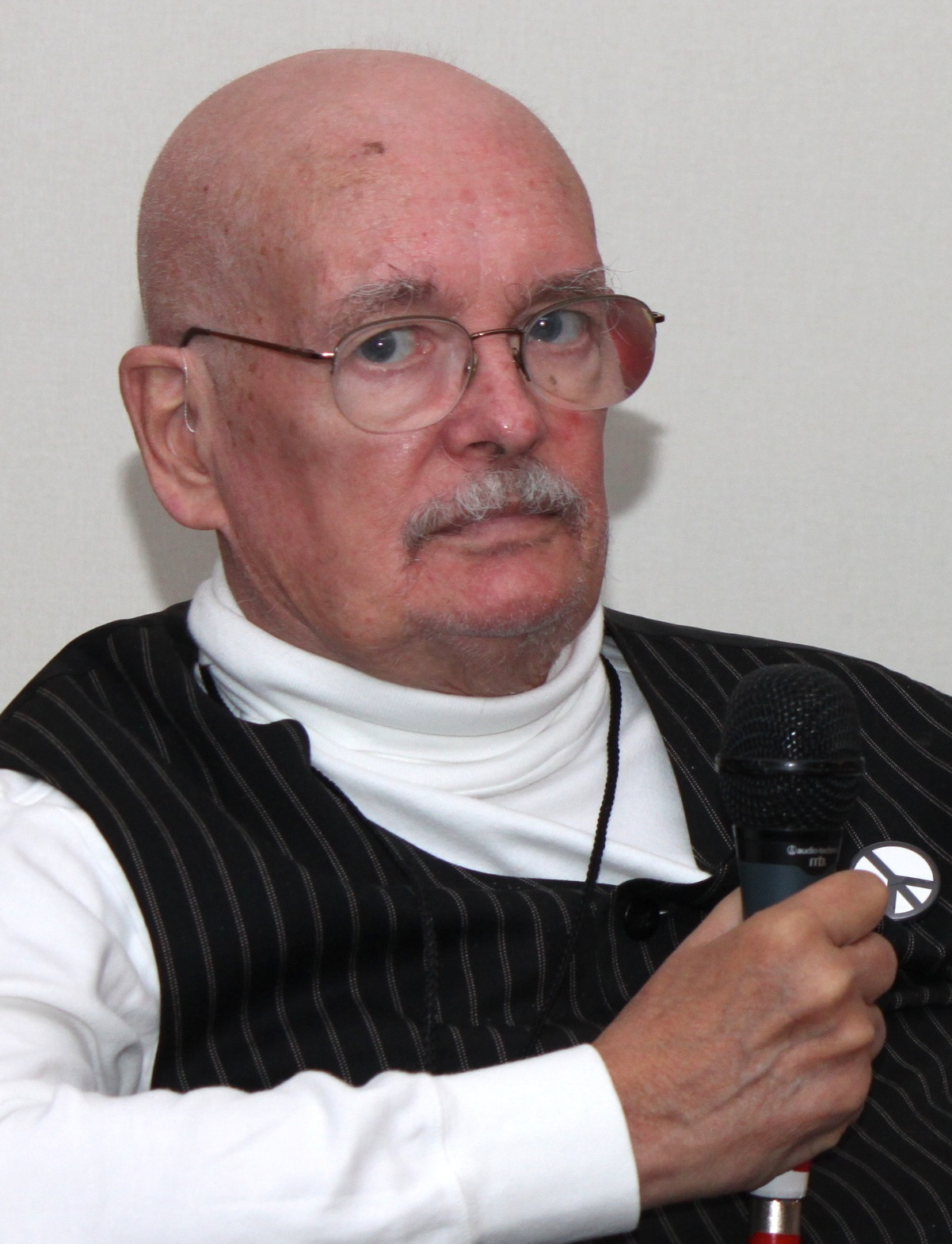
- O'Neil in 2012
- Born: Dennis Joseph O'Neil; May 3, 1939 St. Louis, Missouri, U.S.
- Died: June 11, 2020 (aged 81) Nyack, New York, U.S.
- Areas: Writer, Editor
- Pseudonyms: Sergius O'Shaughnessy; Jim Dennis; Jeff Mundo
- Notable works: Batman, Green Lantern/Green Arrow, The Question, Iron Man, The Amazing Spider-Man, Daredevil
- Awards: Shazam Award (1970, 1971)

Dennis Joseph O'Neil (May 3, 1939 – June 11, 2020) was an American comic book writer and editor, principally for Marvel Comics and DC Comics from the 1960s through the 1990s, and Group Editor for the Batman family of titles until his retirement.

His best-known works include Green Lantern/Green Arrow and Batman with Neal Adams. For Batman, the team is credited with returning the character to his dark pulp fiction roots, in contrast to the campy Batman television series of the 1960s. However, comics historian Les Daniels considers O'Neil's "vengeful obsessive-compulsive" Batman to be an original interpretation that has influenced all subsequent portrayals of the character. It was during this run that O'Neil co-created the Batman villains Ra's al Ghul and Talia al Ghul. During their Green Lantern/Green Arrow run, O'Neil and Adams introduced a mature, realistic tone through stories such as "Snowbirds Don't Fly", in which Green Arrow's ward Roy Harper is revealed to have become addicted to drugs. They also created and introduced the Green Lantern character John Stewart in 1971.

As an editor, he is principally known for editing the various Batman titles beginning in 1986 after returning to DC. In 1989, O'Neil launched the Batman: Legends of the Dark Knight series, and was the writer for the "Shaman" and "Venom" stories. O'Neil led the Batman creative teams for the Batman: Knightfall (1993–1994) story arc. O'Neil co-created the antihero Azrael (Jean-Paul Valley) in 1992, who temporarily became the new Batman during Knightfall. After the storyline's conclusion, O'Neil was the writer for an Azrael monthly series that lasted 100 issues.

His other notable work includes creating Richard Dragon with Jim Berry, and runs on The Shadow with Michael Kaluta and The Question with Denys Cowan. While working for Marvel during the 1980s, O'Neil scripted issues for The Amazing Spider-Man, Iron Man, and Daredevil. In the late 1990s, O'Neil taught a comics writing course at Manhattan's School of Visual Arts. He also sat on the board of directors of the charity The Hero Initiative and served on its Disbursement Committee.

== Early life ==
O'Neil was born into an Irish Catholic household in St. Louis, Missouri on May 3, 1939. His father owned a grocery store. On Sunday afternoons he would accompany his father or his grandfather to the store for some light groceries and an occasional comic book. O'Neil graduated from Saint Louis University around the turn of the 1960s with a degree centered on English literature, creative writing, and philosophy. From there he joined the U.S. Navy just in time to participate in the blockade of Cuba during the Cuban Missile Crisis.

== Career ==
=== Writing ===
After leaving the Navy, O'Neil moved on to a job with a newspaper in Cape Girardeau, Missouri. O'Neil wrote bi-weekly columns for the youth page, and during the slow summer months he filled the space with a series on the revival of the comics industry. This attracted the attention of Roy Thomas, who would eventually himself become one of the great names in the history of the medium.

==== Marvel Comics ====
When Roy Thomas left DC Comics to work for Stan Lee at Marvel Comics, he suggested that O'Neil take the Marvel writer's test, which involved adding dialogue to a wordless four-page excerpt of a Fantastic Four comic. O'Neil's entry resulted in Lee offering O'Neil a job. O'Neil had never considered writing for comics, and later said he'd done the test "kind of as a joke. I had a couple of hours on a Tuesday afternoon, so instead of doing crossword puzzles, I did the writer's test." He had intended to only work in the comics industry for six months to make some extra money, but soon found enjoyment from creating comic book scripts, and abandoned his plans to move back to the Midwestern United States to be a journalist.

O'Neil took the reins for a short-term run of Marvel's Doctor Strange stories in Strange Tales, writing dialogue and captions for six issues that were plotted by artist Steve Ditko. He also wrote for such titles as Rawhide Kid and Millie the Model, and scripted the final 13 pages of Daredevil #18 over a plot by Lee when Lee went on vacation.

Briefly returning to Marvel a few years later, O'Neil and artist Neal Adams revived the Professor X character in X-Men #65 in one of the creative team's earliest collaborations.

==== Charlton Comics ====
The available jobs writing for Marvel petered out fairly quickly, and O'Neil took a job with Charlton Comics under the pseudonym of Sergius O'Shaugnessy. There he received regular work for a year and a half from Charlton's editor Dick Giordano.

"Sergius O'Shaugnessy" is the name of the protagonist of Norman Mailer's 1955 novel The Deer Park. O'Neil has quoted Mailer's writing in at least one of his comic book scripts. He would continue using the pseudonym occasionally throughout his career.

==== DC Comics ====
In 1968, Dick Giordano was offered an editorial position at DC Comics and took a number of Charlton freelancers with him, including O'Neil.

Speedy's habit revealed. Art by Dick Dillin.

O'Neil's first assignments involved two strategies for bolstering DC's sales. One approach centered on the creation of new characters, and O'Neil scripted several issues of Beware the Creeper, a series starring a new hero, the Creeper, created by artist Steve Ditko. From there, DC moved O'Neil to Wonder Woman and Justice League of America. With artist Mike Sekowsky, he took away Wonder Woman's powers, exiled her from the Amazon island of Themiscyra, and set her off, wearing boutique street clothes rather than her superhero uniform, into international intrigues with her blind mentor, I Ching. These changes did not sit well with Wonder Woman's older fans, including feminists such as Gloria Steinem, who successfully lobbied DC to return the character to her roots, and O'Neil later acknowledged that de-powering DC's most well-known superheroine had unintentionally alienated readers. In Justice League, he had more success, scripting socially and politically themed stories that presaged his later work on Green Lantern/Green Arrow. He and artist Dick Dillin made several changes to the membership of the JLA by removing founding members the Martian Manhunter and Wonder Woman.

Following the lead set by Bob Haney and Neal Adams in a Brave and the Bold story that visually redefined Green Arrow into the version that appeared in comics between 1969 and 1986, O'Neil stripped him of his wealth and playboy status, making him an urban hero. This redefinition would culminate in the character that appeared in Green Lantern/Green Arrow (with many stories also drawn by Adams), a socially conscious, left-wing creation that contrasted and debated with the establishment liberal, law and order advocating, Green Lantern. It was during this period that the most famous Green Arrow story appeared, in Green Lantern #85–86 ("Snowbirds Don't Fly"), when it was revealed that Green Arrow's ward Speedy was addicted to heroin. As a result of his work on Green Lantern and Green Arrow, O'Neil recounted, "I went from total obscurity to seeing my name featured in The New York Times and being invited to do talk shows. It's by no means an unmixed blessing. That messed up my head pretty thoroughly for a couple of years. ... Deteriorating marriage, bad habits, deteriorating relationships with human beings – with anything that wasn't a typewriter, in fact. It was a bad few years there." O'Neil and Adams also created Green Lantern John Stewart, who debuted in Green Lantern vol. 2 #87 (December 1971/January 1972).

O'Neil's 1970s run on the Batman titles, under the direction of editor Julius Schwartz, is perhaps his best-known endeavor. Along with fellow writer Frank Robbins, he returned the stories to the character's darker roots after a period dominated by the campiness of the 1960s TV series. Comics historian Les Daniels observed that "O'Neil's interpretation of Batman as a vengeful obsessive-compulsive, which he modestly describes as a return to the roots, was actually an act of creative imagination that has influenced every subsequent version of the Dark Knight." O'Neil and Adams' creation Ra's al Ghul was introduced in the story "Daughter of the Demon" in Batman #232 (June 1971). O'Neil and artist Bob Brown also created Talia al Ghul. During this period, O'Neil frequently teamed up with Adams (with Giordano often assisting on inks) on a number of memorable issues of both Batman and Detective Comics. The creative team would revive Two-Face in "Half an Evil" in Batman #234 (Aug. 1971) and revitalize the Joker in "The Joker's Five-Way Revenge!" in Batman #251 (Sept. 1973), a landmark story bringing the character back to his roots as a homicidal maniac who murders people on a whim and delights in his mayhem. O'Neil and Giordano created the Batman supporting character Leslie Thompkins in the story "There Is No Hope in Crime Alley" in Detective Comics #457 (March 1976). O'Neil and artist Don Newton killed the original version of Batwoman in Detective Comics #485 (Aug.–Sept. 1979). He wrote a short Christmas story, "Wanted: Santa Claus – Dead or Alive", for DC Special Series #21 (Spring 1980) which featured Frank Miller's first art on a Batman story.

When Julius Schwartz became the editor of Superman with issue #233 (Jan. 1971), he had O'Neil and artist Curt Swan streamline the Superman mythos in The Sandman Saga (unrelated to any the DC heroes of the same name) starting with the elimination of kryptonite. In 1973, O'Neil wrote revivals of two characters for which DC had recently acquired the publishing rights. A new series featuring the original Captain Marvel was launched with a February cover date and featured art by the character's original artist C. C. Beck. Later that same year, O'Neil and artist Michael Kaluta produced an "atmospheric interpretation" of the 1930s pulp hero in The Shadow series. In 1975, O'Neil wrote a comic book adaptation of the 1930s hero the Avenger. A revival of the Green Lantern title was launched in 1976 by O'Neil and artist Mike Grell. Reuniting with Adams, O'Neil co-wrote the oversize Superman vs. Muhammad Ali (1978) which Adams has called a personal favorite of their collaborations. In World's Finest #263 (1980), he wrote "Final Secret of the Super-Sons", which wrapped up the Super-Sons stories by exposing them to be just characters inside a computer in Superman's Fortress of Solitude, with Superman then ordering them to commit suicide by jumping into the Fortress' disintegration pit after they escape their computer simulated world.

==== Return to Marvel Comics ====
Upon O'Neil's return to Marvel Comics in 1980, he took on the scripting chores for The Amazing Spider-Man, which he did for a year. O'Neil wrote two issues of The Amazing Spider-Man Annual, both drawn by Frank Miller. The 1980 Annual featured a team-up with Doctor Strange while the 1981 Annual showcased a meeting with the Punisher. He and artist John Romita Jr. introduced Madame Web in The Amazing Spider-Man #210 and Hydro-Man in #212. O'Neil was the regular scripter for Iron Man from 1982 to 1986 and Daredevil from 1983 to 1985. During his run on Iron Man, O'Neil introduced Obadiah Stane, later the Iron Monger, plunged Tony Stark back into alcoholism, turned Jim Rhodes into Iron Man, and created the Silver Centurion armor. O'Neil's run on Daredevil bridged the gap between Frank Miller's two runs on the title, usually with David Mazzucchelli as artist. He introduced Yuriko Oyama during his stint, who would later become the villain Lady Deathstrike. While working for Marvel, he helped write the original character concept for The Transformers, and is credited as the person who named Optimus Prime.

==== Return to DC Comics ====
After returning to DC Comics in 1986, he became the editor of the various Batman titles and served in that capacity until 2000. In February 1987, O'Neil began writing The Question ongoing series which was primarily drawn by Denys Cowan. Between the years of 1988 and 1990, O'Neil would return to Green Arrow by writing the Annuals, while Mike Grell wrote the monthly title. Because he was also in charge of The Question, he would appear in all three Annuals that he wrote. The Batman: Legends of the Dark Knight series began in 1989 with the five-part "Shaman" storyline by O'Neil and artist Ed Hannigan. The series was the first new Batman title in almost fifty years, and the first issue sold almost a million copies. Armageddon 2001 was a 1991 crossover event storyline. It ran through a self-titled two-issue limited series and most of the Annuals DC published that year from May through October. Each participating annual explored potential possible futures for its main characters. The series was written by O'Neil and Archie Goodwin and drawn by Dan Jurgens. He and artist Joe Quesada created the character Azrael, who was introduced in the four-issue miniseries Batman: Sword of Azrael in 1992. That same year, O'Neil wrote the Batman: Birth of the Demon hardcover graphic novel. Another DC one-shot issue that O'Neil wrote in 1992 was Batman/Green Arrow: The Poison Tomorrow.

Azrael temporarily assumed the role of Batman during Knightfall. Art by Joe Quesada.

O'Neil led the Batman creative teams for the Batman: Knightfall (1993–1994) story arc, during which Azrael temporarily became the new Batman. In 1994, O'Neil wrote a novelization of Knightfall. In the opening of the novelization, O'Neil stated that part of the reason "Knightfall" was written was due to the recent popularity of more "ruthless" heroes such as the Terminator and James Bond in films, as editors were starting to wonder if readers would prefer a Batman who was willing to kill his opponents.

After the conclusion of Knightfall, O'Neil wrote the 100-issue Azrael comic series, chronicling Valley's battles against the Order of St. Dumas, between 1995 and 2003. O'Neil modeled the series on Arthurian legends, comparing Azrael's quest to discover the truth about himself to the Holy Grail. The series was originally intended to conclude with Azrael's death. However, after O'Neil suffered a heart attack in September 2002, editor Mike Carlin decided it wouldn't be appropriate to have a character O'Neil created be killed off. O'Neil instead left Azrael's fate vague, preferring to let readers decide what happened to him.

==== Other writing ====
O'Neil wrote several novels, comics, short stories, reviews and teleplays, including the novelizations of the films Batman Begins and The Dark Knight. Under the pseudonym Jim Dennis with writer Jim Berry, O'Neil scripted a series of novels about a kung fu character named Richard Dragon, and later adapted those novels to comic book form for DC. O'Neil also wrote the 1971 novel The Bite of Monsters for Belmont Publishing. That science fiction story chronicles a post-apocalyptic Earth defeated by alien invaders, and a ragtag group of people -- one of whom has super powers -- who attempt to overthrow the aliens.

O'Neil wrote a four-part column series for Marvel's 1978 The Hulk! magazine, under the pseudonym Jeff Mundo. "Jeff Mundo's Dark Corners" ran from issue #21 through issue #24 and covered various pop culture topics.

O'Neil also wrote a column for ComicMix.

=== Editing ===
Joining Marvel's editorial staff in 1980, O'Neil edited Daredevil during Frank Miller's run as writer/artist. He fired writer Roger McKenzie so that Miller could both write and pencil Daredevil, a decision which then-Marvel editor-in-chief Jim Shooter says saved the series from cancellation. O'Neil encouraged Miller to develop a believable fighting style for Daredevil, and according to Miller, this directly led to his incorporating martial arts into Daredevil and later Ronin. In the early to mid-1980s, O'Neil edited such Marvel titles as Alpha Flight, Power Man and Iron Fist, G.I. Joe: A Real American Hero, and Moon Knight.

In 1986, O'Neil moved over to DC as an editor, becoming group editor for the company's Batman titles. Speaking about his role in the death of character Jason Todd, O'Neil remarked:

It changed my mind about what I do for a living. Superman and Batman have been in continuous publication for over half a century, and it's never been true of any fictional construct before. These characters have a lot more weight than the hero of a popular sitcom that lasts maybe four years. They have become postindustrial folklore, and part of this job is to be the custodian of folk figures. Everybody on Earth knows Batman and Robin.

O'Neil said that he saw editing as a support role which should be invisible to the reader, and that if it were his choice his name would not appear in the credits when working as an editor, only when working as a writer.

=== Teaching ===
After graduating college, O'Neil taught English in the St. Louis public school system for one year. O'Neil spent several years in the late 1990s teaching a Writing for the Comics course at Manhattan's School of Visual Arts, sometimes sharing duties with fellow comic book writer John Ostrander.

== Personal life ==
O'Neil was married to Marifran O'Neil, until her death. He was the father of writer/director/producer Lawrence "Larry" O'Neil, best known for the 1997 film Breast Men.

O'Neil died of cardiopulmonary arrest on June 11, 2020, at the age of 81. The animated feature Batman: Soul of the Dragon was dedicated in his memory. The following year, Larry O'Neil wrote a six-page tribute to his father, "Tap Tap Tap," which was illustrated by Jorge Fornés and published in Green Arrow 80th Anniversary 100-Page Super Spectacular #1 (August 2021); the story summarizes O'Neil's life from childhood to death without any written dialogue, instead using logos and other pictograms.

== Awards ==
O'Neil's work won him a great deal of recognition in the comics industry, including the Shazam Awards for Best Continuing Feature Green Lantern/Green Arrow, Best Individual Story for "No Evil Shall Escape My Sight" in Green Lantern/Green Arrow #76 (with Neal Adams), for Best Writer (Dramatic Division) in 1970 for Green Lantern/Green Arrow, Batman, Superman, and other titles, and Best Individual Story for "Snowbirds Don't Fly" in Green Lantern/Green Arrow #85 (with Adams) in 1971.

O'Neil was given a Goethe Award in 1971 for "Favorite Pro Writer" and was a nominee for the same award in 1973. He shared a 1971 Goethe Award with artist Neal Adams for "Favorite Comic-Book Story" for "No Evil Shall Escape My Sight."

O'Neil received an Inkpot Award in 1981 and in 1985, DC Comics named O'Neil as one of the honorees in the company's 50th anniversary publication Fifty Who Made DC Great.

== Appearances in media ==
In The Batman Adventures—the first DC Comics spinoff of Batman: The Animated Series—a caricature of O'Neil appears as The Perfesser, one of a screwball trio of incompetent supervillains that also includes the Mastermind (a caricature of Mike Carlin) and Mr. Nice (a caricature of Archie Goodwin). The Perfesser is depicted as a tall, pipe-smoking genius who often gets lost in his own thoughts; his name is likely derived from Cosmo "Perfessor" Fishhawk of Shoe, which O'Neil was a known reader of.

In 2013, O'Neil was among the comic book writers interviewed in the PBS documentary Superheroes: A Never-Ending Battle.

== Bibliography ==
=== Comic books ===
==== Charlton Comics ====
- Abbott and Costello #1 (1968)
- Thunderbolt #58–60 (1967)
- Space Adventures #2 (1968)

==== DC Comics ====
- 1st Issue Special #13 (1976)
- 9-11: The World's Finest Comic Book Writers & Artists Tell Stories to Remember Volume Two (2002)
- Action Comics #485 (1978)
- Adventure Comics #418–419 (Black Canary), 449–451, 491–492 (1972–1982)
- All New Collectors' Edition #C-56 (Superman vs. Muhammad Ali) (1978)
- All-Star Western #6 (1971)
- Armageddon 2001 #2 (1991)
- Atom and Hawkman #42–45 (1969)
- Azrael #1–100, 1,000,000, Annual #1–3, Azrael Plus Question #1 (1995–2003)
- Azrael/Ash #1 (1997)
- Bat Lash #2–7 (1968–1969)
- Batman #224–225, 227, 232, 234–235, 237, 239–245, 247–248, 251, 253, 256–264, 266, 268, 286, 303, 320, 684 (1970–2009)
- Batman & Robin: The Official Comic Adaptation #1 (1997)
- Batman Black and White #3–4 (1996)
- The Batman Chronicles #6, 16 (1996–1999)
- Batman Family #18–19 (1978)
- Batman Forever: The Official Comic Adaptation #1 (1995)
- Batman Returns: The Official Comic Adaptation #1 (1992)
- Batman/Green Arrow: The Poison Tomorrow #1 (1992)
- Batman/Punisher: Lake of Fire #1 (1994)
- Batman: Birth of the Demon HC (1993)
- Batman: Death of Innocents #1 (1996)
- Batman: Gordon of Gotham #1–4 (1998)
- Batman: Legends of the Dark Knight #1–5, 16–20, 27, 50, 59–61, 63, 100, 127–131, Annual #1-3 (1989–2000)
- Batman: Sword of Azrael #1–4 (1992–1993)
- Batman: The Official Comic Adaptation #1 (1989)
- Beware the Creeper #1–6 (1968–1969)
- The Brave and the Bold #93, 159 (1970–1980)
- Challengers of the Unknown #68–74 (1969–1970)
- DC Comics Presents #16, 19–20, 23 (1979–1980)
- DC Comics Presents: The Flash #1 (2004)
- DC Retroactive: Green Lantern – The '70s #1 (2011)
- DC Retroactive: Wonder Woman – The '70s #1 (2011)
- DC Special Series #1, 15–16, 21 (1977–1980)
- DC Super Stars #17 (1977)
- DC Universe Holiday Bash #1 (1997)
- Detective Comics #395, 397, 399–401, 404–406, 410–411, 414, 418–419, 422, 425, 431, 451, 457, 460–461 (Tim Trench), 462 (Elongated Man), 480–481, 483–491, 851, 866, 1000; Annual #1 (1989) (1969–2020)
- Doc Savage #1–4 (limited series) (1987–1988)
- Doc Savage #1–6 (ongoing series) (1988–1989)
- The Flash #217–221, 223–224, 226–228, 230–231, 233–234, 237–238, 240–243, 245-246 (1972–1977)
- From Beyond the Unknown #7–8 (1970)
- Green Arrow Annual #1–3 (1988–1990)
- Green Lantern #63–64, 68, 72, 76–87, 89–100, 102–106, 108-129 (1968–1972, 1976–1980)
- Green Lantern 80th Anniversary 100-Page Super Spectacular #1
- Isis #1 (1976)
- JLA #91–93 (2004)
- The Joker #1–3, 6 (1975–1976)
- The Joker 80th Anniversary 100-Page Super Spectacular #1 (2020)
- Justice, Inc. #1–4 (1975)
- Justice League of America #66, 68–75, 77–83, 86, 115 (1968–1975)
- Kamandi the Last Boy on Earth! #45–48 (1976–1977)
- Legends of the DC Universe #7–9 (1998)
- Nightwing #1–4 (limited series) (1995)
- Phantom Stranger #8 (1970)
- The Question #1–36, Annual #1–2, Quarterly #1–3, 5 (1987–1992)
- Richard Dragon, Kung Fu Fighter #1–10, 13–18 (1975–1977)
- The Shadow #1–8, 10, 12 (1973–1975)
- Shazam! #1–7, 9, 14–15, 17, 25 (1973–1976)
- "Secret Origins" #50 (1990)
- Showcase #82–84 (1969)
- Showcase 95 #3 (1995)
- Spectre #9 (1969)
- Strange Sports Stories #2, 4 (1973–1974)
- Super Friends #20, 22, 24 (1979)
- Superman #233–238, 240–242, 244, 247, 253, 254, 343, 351 (1971–1980)
- Super-Team Family #2 (1976)
- Sword of Sorcery #1–5 (1973)
- Tarzan #217–218, 255–256 (1973–1976)
- Time Warp #1, 3 (1979–1980)
- Weird Worlds #4–10 (1973–1974)
- Wonder Woman #178–181, 199–201 (1968–1972)
- World's Finest Comics #198–199, 201–202, 204, 211–212, 214, 244, 256–264 (1970–1980)

==== Marvel Comics ====
- The Amazing Spider-Man, #207–219, 221, 223, Annual #14–15 (1980–1981)
- Chamber of Darkness #3–5 (1970)
- Daredevil #18, 194–202, 204–207, 210–218, 220–223, 225–226 (1966, 1983–1986)
- Deadly Hands of Kung Fu #6 (1974)
- Epic Illustrated #15–20 (1983)
- Ghost Rider #7 (1967)
- Heroes for Hope: Starring the X-Men #1 (1985)
- The Hulk! #21–24 (Dominic Fortune back-up stories) (1980–1981)
- Iron Man #158, 160–208 (1982–1986)
- Kid Colt Outlaw #134–136, 138–139 (1967–1969)
- Millie the Model #138–151, 153 (1966–1967)
- Marvel Super Special #20 (Dragonslayer adaptation) (1981)
- Moon Knight #26 (1982)
- Power Man and Iron Fist #85–89 (1982–1983)
- Rawhide Kid #56, 58–59, 60, 62, 66 (1966–1968)
- Savage Tales #1 (1971)
- Savage Tales (vol. 2) #5 (1986)
- Strange Tales #145–149, 167–168 (1966–1968)
- Team America #2 (1982)
- Two-Gun Kid #90, 92 (1967–1968)
- X-Men #65 (1970)

=== Warren ===
- Vampirella #10 (1971)

=== Graphic novels ===
- The Shadow "1941": Hitler's Astrologer – with Michael Kaluta and Russ Heath 1988
- Batman: Birth of the Demon – 1992
- Green Lantern/Green Arrow Vol. 1: Hard-Traveling Heroes – 1992
- Batman: Shaman – 1993
- Batman: Venom – 1993, 2012
- Green Lantern/Green Arrow Vol. 2: More Hard-Traveling Heroes – 1993
- Batman: Sword of Azrael – 1993
- Batman: Bloodstorm – 1995
- Batman: Death of Innocents: the Horror of Landmines – 1996
- Batman in the Seventies – 2000
- The Green Lantern/Green Arrow Collection – 2000
- The Deadman Collection – 2001
- Batman: The Ring, the Arrow, and the Bat – 2003
- Green Lantern/Green Arrow Collection Volume 1 – 2004
- Green Lantern/Green Arrow Collection Volume 2 – 2005
- Green Lantern: Hero's Quest – 2005
- Green Lantern/Green Arrow – 2012

=== Novellas ===
- The Iconoclasts – Fantastic Stories, ed. Ted White, Ultimate Publishing, 1971
- "Report on a Broken Bridge" – Ellery Queen's Mystery Magazine, December 1971
- After They've Seen Paree – Generation, ed. David Gerrold, Dell, 1972
- "The Elseones" – The Magazine of Fantasy & Science Fiction, February 1972
- "Mister Cherubim" – Fantastic, June 1972
- "Noonday Devil" – Saving Worlds, eds. Roger Elwood and Virginia Kidd, Doubleday, 1973
- "Devil Night" – Haunt of Horror, August 1973
- "Annie Mae: A Love Story" – The Far Side of Time, ed. Roger Elwood, Dodd Mead, 1974
- "There Are No Yesterdays!" – Unknown Worlds of Science Fiction March 1975
- "Sister Mary Talks to the Girls Sodality" – Harpoon Magazine, January 1975
- "The Killing of Mother Corn" – The Magazine of Fantasy & Science Fiction, February 1975
- "Father Flotsky" – Apple Pie Magazine, May 1975
- "Alias the Last Resort" – Best Detective Stories of the Year, ed. Hubin, 1975
- "Adam and No Eve" (with Alfred Bester) – Unknown Worlds of Science Fiction, March 1975
- "Wave By" – The Magazine of Fantasy & Science Fiction, September 1980
- "Bicycle Superhero"- Superheroes, ed. John Varley, Ace Fantasy, 1995

=== Novels ===
- The Bite of Monsters – Belmont, 1971
- Dragon's Fists – Richard Dragon, Kung Fu Master with Jim Berry, 1974
- Secret Origins of the Super DC Heroes – Crown Publishing Group, April 1976
- The Super Comics – Scholastic Book Services 1981
- Batman: Knightfall – 1994
- Green Lantern: Hero's Quest – 2005
- Batman Begins – 2005
- DC Universe: Helltown – 2006
- The Dark Knight – 2008

=== Non-fiction ===
- The DC Comics Guide To Writing Comics, Watson-Guptill, May 2001 ISBN 0-823010-27-9
- Batman Unauthorized: Vigilantes, Jokers, and Heroes in Gotham City, SmartPop series, Benbella Books, March 2008 (editor) ISBN 1-933771-30-5

=== Essays, reviews and interviews ===
- The Lurker in the Family Room – The Haunt of Horror, June 1973
- Review of Will Eisner's "A Contract With God" – Comics Journal #46, May 1979
- Interview w/ Samuel R. Delany – Comics Journal #48, Summer 1979
- The Super Comics – 1980
- Article on Garry Trudeau/Doonesbury – Comics Journal #63, Summer 1981
- Forum & Interview w/ Gil Kane – Comics Journal #64 July 1981
- The Man of Steel and Me – Superman at 50, 1987
- Martial Arts – Superman & Batman Magazine #1, with Marifran O'Neil, Summer 1993
- Comics 101/Classes 1 & 2 – Write Now! #3, March 2003
- Comics 101/Classes 3 & 4 – Write Now! #4, May 2003
- Comics 101/Classes 5 & 6 – Write Now! #5, August 2003
- "Introduction" to Superhero: The Secret Origin of a Genre by Peter Coogan (MonkeyBrain Books) (July 25, 2006)

== Television ==
- Logan’s Run (1978)
  - ”Stargate”
- G.I Joe: A Real American Hero (1985)
  - ”The Invaders”
- Superboy (1989)
  - ”Meet Mr. Mxyzptlk”
  - ”Mr. and Mrs. Superboy”
- Batman: The Animated Series (1993)
  - ”The Demon’s Quest Part 1”
  - ”The Demon’s Quest Part 2”

== Animated film ==
- Batman: Gotham Knight – audio commentary, 2008

Positions
Preceded by Gardner Fox	Justice League of America writer 1968–1970	Succeeded by Robert Kanigher
Preceded by Frank Robbins	Detective Comics writer 1970–1972	Succeeded by Frank Robbins
Preceded by Frank Robbins	Batman writer 1970–1975	Succeeded by David V. Reed
Preceded by Mike Friedrich	Green Lantern writer 1970–1972 and 1976–1980	Succeeded by Bob Rozakis
Preceded by Len Wein	Detective Comics writer 1978–1980	Succeeded by Cary Burkett
Preceded by Marv Wolfman	The Amazing Spider-Man writer 1980–1981	Succeeded by Roger Stern
Preceded by David Michelinie	Iron Man writer 1982–1986	Succeeded by Danny Fingeroth
Preceded by Frank Miller	Daredevil writer 1983–1985	Succeeded by Frank Miller
Preceded by Len Wein	Batman Group Editor; 1986–2000	Succeeded by Bob Schreck
