= Roy Harper (character) =

DC Comics character

- Roy Harper joins the Justice League as the Red Arrow in Justice League of America (vol. 2) #7 (May 2007). Art by Ed Benes.

Publication information
- Publisher: DC Comics
- First appearance: As Speedy: More Fun Comics #73 (November 1941); As Arsenal: The New Titans #99 (July 1993); As Red Arrow: Alternative universe: Kingdom Come #2 (June 1996); Main universe: Justice League of America vol. 2 #7 (May 2007)
- Created by: Speedy: Mort Weisinger (writer); George Papp (artist); Arsenal: Marv Wolfman (writer); Tom Grummett (artist); Red Arrow: Mark Waid (writer); Alex Ross (artist)

In-story information
- Alter ego: Roy William Harper Jr.
- Species: Human
- Team affiliations: Teen Titans; Justice League; Seven Soldiers of Victory; Young Justice; Central Bureau of Intelligence; Checkmate; Outsiders; The Outlaws
- Partnerships: Green Arrow; Black Canary; Cheshire
- Notable aliases: Speedy; Arsenal; Red Arrow
- Abilities: Expert archer and marksman; Highly skilled martial artist and hand-to-hand combatant; Highly skilled athlete; Weapons expert; Uses trick arrows; Espionage; Cybernetically enhanced; Expert leader

Roy William Harper Jr. is a superhero appearing in American comic books published by DC Comics. Roy is one of DC's most longstanding characters, originating in 1940s comics as Speedy, the teen sidekick of the superheroes Green Arrow and Black Canary. Like his mentor Green Arrow, Roy is a world-class archer and athlete who uses his exceptional marksmanship to fight crime. Along with other prominent DC Comics superhero sidekicks, he goes on to become a core member of the superhero group the Teen Titans. As an adult, Roy casts off his Speedy identity to establish himself as the superhero Arsenal, and later takes on the name Red Arrow to symbolise his coming-of-age and having become an equal of Green Arrow as he joins the Justice League. In addition to continuing to serve on occasion as one of the Titans, Roy has had leading roles in the superhero groups the Seven Soldiers of Victory, the Outsiders, Checkmate, the Justice League, and the Outlaws.

He was the subject of the award-winning 1971 comic book story "Snowbirds Don't Fly", which was celebrated for its gritty depiction of Roy's battle with drug addiction; the story is considered a key moment in comic book history, as it represented the emergence of mature themes in comics. In 2013, ComicsAlliance ranked Harper as #50 on their list of the "50 Sexiest Male Characters in Comics". The character has been adapted for video games and animation several times, and was portrayed in live action by Colton Haynes on the Arrowverse television series Arrow.

== Publication history ==
The character first appeared as Green Arrow's teenage sidekick Speedy, a name by which he was known for over fifty years, in More Fun Comics #73 (November 1941) and was created by Mort Weisinger and George Papp. The character's modern-day version was an early member of the Teen Titans who later assumed the identity Arsenal in The New Titans #99 (July 1993), and became a member of the Justice League of America under the guise Red Arrow in Kingdom Come #2 (June 1996) or Justice League of America vol. 2 #7 (May 2007).

== Fictional character biography ==
=== 1941–1992: Origin, Teen Titans, addiction and fatherhood ===
As an infant, Roy was raised by his father, Roy Harper Sr., a forest ranger. The fate of his birth mother is unknown, something that Roy has questioned his entire life, not sure whether she left them or died. When his father died in a forest fire when Roy was a baby, he was rescued by a man named Brave Bow, a Navajo medicine chief. Brave Bow took Roy into his tribe and raised him as his own son, telling him about how his birth father saved him, which made Roy grow up seeing him as a hero. Under Brave Bow's tutelage, Roy trained in archery, becoming remarkable at a young age and a champion in several events. Roy began learning about the superhero Green Arrow (Oliver Queen) and started idolizing him, seeing him as a hero alongside his father and Brave Bow.

When Brave Bow learned of an illness that would lead to his death, he contacted Green Arrow, asking him to take Roy in and raise him after his death. After posing as a judge in an archery contest, Green Arrow becomes impressed by Roy's skills as an archer, which prompts him to test Roy's character by rigging his arrows with magnets so they can be deflected. After Brave Bow's death, Roy was adopted by Green Arrow and became his sidekick, Speedy. He was given the name Speedy after stopping a pair of robbers faster than Green Arrow could even put on his costume, and for being quicker than him at shooting arrows and in general.

Roy Harper as Speedy. Art by George Pérez.

Speedy becomes a founding member of the Teen Titans along with Robin, Kid Flash, Aqualad, and Wonder Girl, a group they formed so they as sidekicks could come out of their mentors' shadows. Roy develops a crush on Wonder Girl Donna Troy, and the two begin dating. As Roy spends more time with the Teen Titans, Oliver leaves to travel the country with Green Lantern (Hal Jordan) after losing his fortune. When the Teen Titans break up, Roy finds himself alone. Trying to find some comfort, he starts taking drugs and develops a heroin addiction in the award-winning story "Snowbirds Don't Fly". When Oliver returns and learns of Roy's addiction, he banishes Roy from his house. When Hal finds Roy on the street later, Roy vows to fight and end his drug addiction. Hal takes him to Black Canary, who helps Roy with his drug withdrawal. Roy reconciles with Oliver, but leaves him to go solo.

When the Teen Titans reforms, Roy rejoins the team. In addition, Roy begins working with the US Drug Enforcement Administration, working as a counselor in various anti-drug programs as well as in helping taking down drug operations and drug lords. His work with the DEA leads to him joining the Central Bureau of Intelligence (CBI), where he works as an agent and spy. While on undercover assignment with the CBI in Japan, Roy is assigned to capture the assassin Cheshire, but they end up falling in love. Roy's feelings for Cheshire lead him to let her go.

About a year later, Roy reunites with Cheshire on a mission with the Titans, where he found out he fathered a daughter with her, Lian. However, Cheshire, only allows Roy to see Lian once. Desperate to see Lian again on her first birthday, Roy sought the help of Dick Grayson. The two of them found Lian and fought off Cheshire. It was here that Cheshire realized how much more dangerous her life as an assassin was, and she decided to give Roy full custody of Lian.

Roy moves to Los Angeles, where he took up work as a private detective, balancing that job with being Speedy and raising his daughter. It was during this time that Roy also reunites with Oliver after some time of not being on full speaking terms, where he was finally prepared to forgive him and accept him as a father.

=== 1993–1996: Becoming Arsenal and leading the Titans ===
Roy decides to take up spy work again and joins Checkmate under the command of Sarge Steel. While at Checkmate, Roy expands his skills beyond just using a bow and arrow and becomes a weapons expert, as well as mastering Moo Gi Gong, the martial art of using any household or random item as a weapon. At Checkmate, Roy became friends with a fellow agent, Martin Santos and his wife Erika and their family, who helped him with Lian in her early years.

Being a founding member and current reserve member of the Titans, Roy is sent by Checkmate to talk to Dick about the Titans, who had been under pressure from the government and the media due to the large amount of damage caused in the battle against the Wildebeests in the "Titans Hunt" storyline. Roy is asked to convince Dick into having the Titans cooperate with the government; he had also secretly heard that if the Titans did not cooperate, Congress would work on shutting down all superhero teams, so he tried to levy the situation as much as he could, but he knew it would not work out.

Roy suggests a compromise to Sarge Steel: that he would return to the Titans full-time and make sure everything was going smooth himself. Since he had not been Speedy for some time, Roy decided to take on a new mantle. With some help and technology acquired from Steve Dayton, Roy built new gear and a new costume, now officially calling himself Arsenal.

Some time later, the wedding of Dick and Starfire is interrupted by an attack, causing the death of the minister and damage all around. This caused a major uproar from the government and media against the Titans. Sarge Steel turns on the deal he made with Roy, demanding that he take leadership of the Titans himself, or else the government will shut them down. Roy refuses, not wanting to turn on Dick because Roy had faith in him as a leader, confident that Dick would turn it around, but continues to be pressured by Steel. Dick agrees to temporarily resign leadership until the situation is resolved. In Dick's absence, Roy becomes leader of the Titans.

=== 1996–2003: Titans reunion ===
After the death of Oliver Queen, Roy moves to Metropolis. During a reunion with Dick, Wally, and Garth, Roy faces the villain Haze, who makes Roy face an image of his ideal self, which was him in a red version of the Green Arrow suit. To honor Oliver, Roy takes on the red Green Arrow suit fully and goes back to using a bow as his primary weapon. He joins the new Teen Titans team, acting as an experienced mentor to the younger new heroes along with fellow first generation Titan Lilith Clay.

While in Metropolis, Roy and Lian are sought out by Vandal Savage, who has discovered that Roy and Lian are his descendants and intends to take their organs for his use to prolong his life. Roy saves Lian from Savage and gets a band tattoo on his left bicep to honor his Navajo heritage.

Shortly after, Roy joined the rest of the original five Titans in reforming the Titans team for a new generation. Roy becomes a mentor role to Grant Emerson, the younger hero known as Damage, who Roy recruits in his tenure as leader. It was also during this time that Roy found out he had a living relative: Jim Harper, a clone of his great uncle.

=== 2004–2006: Death of Donna Troy and reforming the Outsiders ===
A mysterious conglomerate known as Optitron offers to sponsor the Titans and Young Justice after summoning them to San Francisco. Before any decisions can be made, a cybernetic girl from the future known as Indigo invades the complex, and immediately engaged both teams in combat. With half the group out of commission, the remaining members try to track down Indigo, but instead encounter a rogue Superman android, which had been activated. The Superman android manages to kill Donna Troy and Lilith Clay before Indigo shuts it down. Shaken by these losses, Nightwing decides to disband the Titans.

Mourning Donna's death, Roy dons a new, more advanced suit and assembles a new team of Outsiders. During a mission, Roy is shot five times in the chest, leaving him out of commission for three months. During a later battle with Deathstroke, Roy is spared after Deathstroke sees the bullet scars on Arsenal's chest, reasoning that he has suffered enough.

After the return of Donna Troy, Roy begins to rethink his position as an Outsider. While leading an effort to take down the Secret Society, Roy realized that working like this was too much for him, and that operating from the shadows was not for him, and that he was not meant to blur the line. When Lian told him that she saw him up at night, looking sad, Roy decides to leave the Outsiders, accepting that he was not made for the life of a cloak-and-dagger type hero. He hands leadership of the team back to Dick and took his leave, seeking to be a hero more in the light, aspiring to be more of a hero that can be an inspiration to people and to Lian.

=== 2005–2011: Becoming Red Arrow and joining the Justice League ===
For the next year, Roy largely works solo. During a team up with Black Canary and Hal Jordan, Roy finds himself fighting Amazo alongside several other heroes. After this, he is invited to join the Justice League, where he officially took on the name Red Arrow. As Red Arrow, Roy found himself to be fully settled for the first time in a while, happy that he was fully embracing his legacy. He buys a house in Star City to give Lian more room as she grew up, and even begins giving her archery lessons, realizing that one day, she would probably want to take on the family legacy herself.

During a fight with Prometheus, Roy's right arm is severed and he is left comatose. Prometheus unleashes an earthquake on Star City that results in Lian being killed. After recovering, Roy receives a cybernetic arm developed by Cyborg. While dealing with his grief, Roy joins Cheshire in Deathstroke's new rogue Titans team in a bid to take out Deathstroke from the inside. Unbeknownst to Roy, Deathstroke is drugging Roy to control him. After recovering from the drug's effects, Roy decides to redeem the Titans name that Slade diminished, deeming it something worth fighting for, as well as making amends with everyone he loved.

During the Convergence storyline, Roy is living in Gotham, where he started a children's home and shelter, Lian's Place. The villain Dreamslayer offers Roy a deal: that he would return Lian if Roy betrayed his friends Donna Troy and Starfire. Roy outsmarts Dreamslayer and manages to get Lian back without harming anyone, revealing that he had weaponized Gotham in case something like this ever happened.

=== 2011–2016: The New 52 ===
In DC's New 52 reboot Roy's backstory becomes more developed: his mother is no longer an unknown, but a forest ranger with his father, who die together in the forest fire. He is adopted into a Spokane tribe in Seattle (instead of a Navajo tribe in Arizona) by Big Bow (previously named Brave Bow) gaining an adoptive brother, Bird. Big Bow was killed in mysterious circumstances, and for several years Roy believed he was the culprit, as during that time he was so heavily intoxicated his memories were unclear or forgotten. Years later, he would discover Big Bow was killed by a corrupt sheriff, who Roy then brought to justice with help from Oliver Queen.

Roy's relationship with Oliver is only slightly changed in the reboot, with the story of their separation remaining similar and the main change appearing in their reunion which takes far longer.

In the New 52, Roy's addiction was retconned into an alcohol addiction, before being retconned back again into a heroin addiction. After he falls out with Oliver and loses his shares in Q-core he seeks out street fights and violence as a part of a downward spiral. He ends up fighting Killer Croc and tries to provoke Croc into killing him. Killer Croc recognizes Roy's suicidal behavior and demands Roy "get[s] on with his life" and that he will not do his 'dirty work' for him. An unlikely friendship develops between the two, with Killer Croc seeing his own past as an addict in Roy and becoming Roy's sponsor, assisting in his recovery. After Roy becomes sober, he joins the Outlaws, where he becomes closer with Jason Todd (Red Hood) and develops a romantic relationship with Starfire.

During the Titans Hunt storyline, Roy, along with several other heroes, found out he was part of the original Teen Titans, with all of their memories being forgotten due to unknown circumstances. When they discovered their memories were erased as a way to defeat the villain Mister Twister, they defeated him once more in the present. This led to the team being reformed, with the team regaining their memories of each other's relationships. Roy's romance with Donna Troy was rekindled during this time, as the two remembered the years they spent together.

=== 2016–2020: DC Rebirth ===
As part of DC Rebirth, Roy appeared as a main character in the Titans book, where he and the rest of the Titans were reunited with their best friend Wally West after he reappeared in the timeline. When Lilith encountered an anomaly in the multiverse, the Titans moved to Manhattan to investigate, where they set up Titans Tower once. The Titans took on various villains such as Abra Kadabra and the Fearsome Five, and Roy led them to take out a drug operation for a new drug known as Bliss. Roy also redeveloped his romantic relationship with Donna Troy here, with the two admitting their shared feelings to one another.

=== 2021–2022: Infinite Frontier ===
During the "Heroes in Crisis" storyline, Roy is among the heroes killed in a Speed Force explosion caused by Savitar. In Dark Nights: Death Metal, Batman resurrects Roy using a Black Lantern ring.

Following his resurrection, Roy is believed dead by the public, but is known to the Department of Extranormal Operations. He is the subject of one of several reports prepared by Cameron Chase for Director Bones. The report establishes that some aspects of Roy's pre-Flashpoint history have been restored to continuity, most notably the birth and apparent death of Lian Harper. Chase speculates about how Roy is handling his restored traumatic memories and whether he can be an asset or hindrance to the DEO.

It is revealed in DC Festival of Heroes: The Asian Superhero Celebration that the vigilante Cheshire Cat is Lian Harper, alive and apparently suffering from amnesia.

After stopping an argument at a diner, the building came under attack by soldiers led by X-Tract (Cameron Chase of Earth-2) seeking to capture Roy only for a beam of dark energy to blast them away. Roy realizes that he now wields a Black Lantern ring. Roy demands the ring to find Lian, but it transforms him into a zombie-like state with an Omega symbol on his chest, revealing itself to be controlled by Darkseid. Roy is saved by Jade and Obsidian helping him to break free from the ring's control.

=== 2023–present: Dawn of DC ===
Reunited with Dinah and Connor Hawke, the three began searching for Green Arrow, who became lost in the timestream during the League's battle with the Dark Army. Along the way, Roy discovered that Lian is operating as the vigilante Cheshire Cat in Gotham City. After arriving in Gotham, Roy and Lian briefly reunite only for her and Connor to be teleported to different timezones. Discovering that Amanda Waller was behind it, Roy and Dinah track down Peacemaker, demanding to know where Waller is, which Peacemaker refused to discuss. With no other option, Roy contacted Jade to help them find Lian, Connor and Oliver. After separating with Dinah, Roy and Jade track down one of Waller's safehouses.

== Powers and abilities ==
Roy Harper possesses no superhuman attributes, but he is extremely adept at the use of the bow and arrow, as well as a wide array of weaponry, with Green Arrow admitting that Roy surpassed him. He also has the ability to take virtually any object and use it in combat as an effective weapon - a martial art he mastered known as Moo Gi Gong, a branch of Hwa Rang Do. Roy's Moo Gi Gong training included the mastery of 108 different classical weapon classes, which makes him a master weapon wielder with any weapon type (including, but not limited to, knives, swords, ropes, sais, blades, and staffs) and able to turn any random object into a deadly weapon. In addition, Roy's natural marksmanship and archery training from growing up gives him an impeccable aim with any long range or projectile weapons. Harper is also a skilled hand-to-hand combatant and he possesses keen analytical and detective skills. He was trained in hand-to-hand fighting by several characters, including Black Canary and Nightwing. He was also taught how to box by Hal Jordan. Roy is a master of espionage because of his spy days at the CBI and Checkmate. Roy can also use acupressure as a means of temporarily disabling an opponent's muscles by hitting them at very specific points in their bodies, something that comes in handy with his precise aim.

Roy speaks Japanese and understands Russian. Before Flashpoint, after the loss of his right arm, Roy Harper received an advanced prosthetic, built by Cyborg, designed to loop around his damaged nerve endings and restore his usual degree of hand-to-eye coordination, albeit with the price of a constant phantom limb pain. The pain was eliminated in the second version of the arm.

=== Weapons and equipment ===
Before Flashpoint, much like Nightwing and other members of the Bat-Family, Roy Harper's suit is capable of emitting an electronic pulse. It is unknown, however, whether or not his suit is capable of emitting only one pulse, like Batman's and Nightwing's, or several. Roy carries various weapons in his many suits, including a bow and several arrows, with many utility and trick arrows. He has been known to carry around a crossbow, throwing knives, a staff, laser heat sidearms, billy clubs, a boomerang, an electrified bolas amongst a wide array of non-lethal weapons.

Roy also embeds Promethium Kevlar to armor his suits, which has saved his life on at least two occasions.

== Other versions ==
- The Earth-Two version of Speedy was a member of the Seven Soldiers of Victory and All-Star Squadron along with Green Arrow before the two were killed during Crisis on Infinite Earths.
- A Bizarro version of Arsenal appears in Supergirl (vol. 5) #57.
- An alternate universe version of Roy Harper appears in Batman: Thrillkiller.
- An alternate universe version of Roy Harper appears in Flashpoint. This version is a mercenary working for Oliver Queen who is later killed by Vixen and a group of anti-Queen activists.
- An alternate timeline version of Roy Harper who became Green Arrow appears in Titans Tomorrow.
- In the Absolute Universe, an alternate universe version of Roy Harper appears in Absolute Green Arrow. This version is a close friend and protégé of Oliver Queen who assists Dinah Lance in investigating billionaire Hector Hammond following Queen's assassination and the emergence of the mysterious Green Arrow Killer.

== In other media ==
=== Television ===
==== Animation ====
William Harper, one of Roy Harper's clones, as Red Arrow as he appears in Young Justice

- Roy Harper / Speedy appears in the "Teen Titans" segment of The Superman/Aquaman Hour of Adventure, voiced by Pat Harrington Jr.
- Roy Harper / Speedy appears in Teen Titans (2003), voiced by Mike Erwin. Following a minor appearance in the episode "Winner Take All", in which he displays a serious, businesslike attitude and becomes an honorary member of the eponymous Teen Titans, he goes on to join their sister group Titans East in their self-titled two-part episode, displaying his traditional "bad boy" personality.
- Roy Harper / Speedy appears in the Justice League Unlimited episode "Patriot Act", voiced again by Mike Erwin. This version is Green Arrow's "ex-partner" and a member of the Justice League.
- Roy Harper / Speedy appears in the Robot Chicken episode "They Took My Thumbs", voiced by Breckin Meyer.
- Roy Harper / Speedy appears in Batman: The Brave and the Bold, voiced primarily by Jason Marsden and by Ryan Ochoa in flashbacks. This version is portrayed as a stereotypical kid sidekick who commonly uses phrases like "Golly!" or "Holy [insert uncommon phrase]".
- Roy Harper appears in Young Justice, voiced by Crispin Freeman. Initially starting as Speedy, this version was captured by the Light, who amputated his right arm to make two clones of him and control them through a combination of programming and hypnosis to serve their needs over the course of eight years. One clone would become Jim Harper / Guardian, who serves as security for Project Cadmus and operates as a superhero under the belief that he is Roy Harper's uncle, while the second was made to believe he was the real Roy Harper and serve as a sleeper agent inside the Justice League. After becoming Red Arrow, eventually succeeding in joining the League, and learning of his true nature, the second Roy married Cheshire and had a daughter, Lian Nguyen-Harper, all while spending the next five years searching for the real Roy, causing his health and friendships to decline. Upon finding and freeing him, the real Roy seeks revenge on Light member Lex Luthor, who gives him a bionic arm. Choosing not to pursue revenge against Luthor, Roy takes the name Arsenal and briefly joins the Team before being ousted for his recklessness and disobedience while the second Roy retires from being a superhero to focus on being a father. In the third season, Young Justice: Outsiders, the second Roy renames himself Will Harper and founds a company called Bowhunter Security to support his family.
- Roy Harper / Speedy appears in Teen Titans Go! (2013), voiced by Scott Menville.

==== Live-action ====
- Roy Harper / Arsenal appears in Arrow, portrayed by Colton Haynes. This version is a vigilante who is inspired by Oliver Queen and in an on-and-off relationship with Thea Queen. In the second season, Harper has begun working alongside Oliver as a vigilante. After being captured by Brother Blood and injected with Deathstroke's Mirakuru drug, Harper gains superhuman strength and healing coupled with increased hostility and violent tendencies. He is eventually cured by Oliver and Sara Lance and becomes a full-fledged member of Team Arrow, though at the cost of his relationship with Thea. In the seventh season, Harper is killed fighting the Thanatos Guild and is revived by Thea and Nyssa al Ghul via a Lazarus Pit, resulting in him occasionally suffering from uncontrollable fits of rage. In the eighth season, Harper rejoins Team Arrow as a means of treating his aggression. He later loses an arm and receives a mechanical prosthetic in the process. In the series finale "Fadeout", Harper becomes engaged to Thea.
- Roy Harper / Speedy appears in a photograph depicted in the Stargirl episode "Brainwave" as a member of the Seven Soldiers of Victory.

=== Film ===
- Roy Harper / Speedy appears in films set in the DC Animated Movie Universe (DCAMU) as a member of the Teen Titans.
  - Harper first appears in Teen Titans: The Judas Contract, voiced again by Crispin Freeman.
  - Harper makes a non-speaking appearance in Justice League Dark: Apokolips War, in which he joins Earth's heroes in confronting Darkseid, only to be killed in battle.
- Two incarnations of Roy Harper make cameo appearances in Teen Titans Go! To the Movies.

=== Video games ===
- Roy Harper / Speedy appears in Teen Titans (2005), voiced again by Mike Erwin.
- Roy Harper as Speedy and Red Arrow appears as a character summon in Scribblenauts Unmasked: A DC Comics Adventure.
- Roy Harper / Red Arrow makes a cameo appearance in Green Arrow's ending in Injustice: Gods Among Us.
- The Arrow incarnation of Roy Harper appears as a playable character in Lego Batman 3: Beyond Gotham via downloadable content.
- Roy Harper / Arsenal appears as a playable character in Lego DC Super-Villains, voiced again by Crispin Freeman.

=== Miscellaneous ===
- The Justice League Unlimited incarnation of Roy Harper / Speedy appears in Justice League Adventures #30.
- The Teen Titans animated series incarnation of Roy Harper / Speedy appears in Teen Titans Go! (2004). Additionally, an evil, alternate reality version of him appears in issue #48 as a member of the Teen Tyrants.
- The Teen Titans Go! (2013) incarnation of Roy Harper / Speedy appears in the Teen Titans Go! To Camp tie-in comic book series.
- The Arrow incarnation of Roy Harper / Arsenal appears in the non-canonical tie-in comic Arrow: Season 2.5.
- Roy Harper appears in Smallville Season 11: Continuity #4 as a member of the Outsiders.
