= Red Dart =

Red Dart is the name of several characters appearing in comic books published by DC Comics.

A female version of Red Dart appears in the seventh season of The CW Arrowverse series Arrow, portrayed by Holly Elissa.

== Fictional character biography ==
=== John Mallory ===
Red Dart

Publication information
- First appearance: World's Finest Comics #95 (July–August 1958)
- Created by: Ed Herron; George Papp

In-story information
- Full name: John Mallory
- Species: Human
- Abilities: Uses trick darts

John "Midas" Mallory is a man who has been going around stopping crimes in Star City. This attracts the attention of Green Arrow and Speedy. Unbeknownst to the two, Red Dart is secretly in allegiance with a group of gold thieves. The next night, Green Arrow deduces the truth about Red Dart and captures him and the gold thieves. Green Arrow proves Red Dart's allegiance to the gold thieves by removing one of his gloves to reveal gold stains, which is a tell-tale sign of testing gold with Aqua-Regia.

Red Dart later plots to assassinate Green Arrow by using a booby trap at the time he was going to speak at an engagement in Dallas. This plan fails because Atom shows up instead. He teams up with Air Wave to defeat Red Dart. When Red Dart tries to beam up to the Justice League's satellite, he is taken away by another teleportation beam.

=== Anthony ===
When the Justice League arrives in Belle Reve to deal with the prison riots, a minor criminal named Anthony who calls himself Red Dart steals Green Lantern's power ring during his fight with the Color Queens prison gang (consisting of Crazy Quilt, Doctor Light, Doctor Spectro, Multi-Man, and Rainbow Raider). He plans to give it to someone on the Green Mile and then return it to Green Lantern. When Superman reclaims the power ring from Red Dart as the prison riot is being quelled, Red Dart privately remarks that this is probably the coolest thing he will ever do, knowing that he will be partly responsible for the death of Superman. When Red Dart is back in his cell with nothing but a picture of Green Lantern's power ring, he wonders what his employers wanted. It is revealed that his employers are Lex Luthor and Prometheus, who are forming a new version of the Injustice Gang. Their temporary theft of the ring allows them to sabotage it so that Green Lantern cannot use it. However, Green Lantern eventually restores the ring to working order through force of will.

=== Unnamed female ===
An unnamed female incarnation of Red Dart is introduced following The New 52 continuity reboot. This version is a member of Ricardo Diaz's Longbow Hunters alongside Brick, Count Vertigo, and Killer Moth.

== Powers and abilities ==
The John Mallory incarnation of Red Dart uses trick darts.

== In other media ==
The female incarnation of Red Dart appears in the seventh season of Arrow, portrayed by Holly Elissa. This version is a member of the Longbow Hunters who prefers quiet subterfuge and subtle tactics.
