= List of DC Comics characters: J =

== M'yrnn J'onzz ==
M'yrnn J'onzz is the father of J'onn J'onzz / Martian Manhunter and Ma'alefa'ak. He was captured by Apokoliptian forces, who separated his soul from his body. When J'onn arrives to free the Martians from Apokolips, he finds his father, but is unable to reunite his body and soul. Instead, J'onn frees M'yrnn's soul from containment, allowing him to attack the Apokoliptians before leaving for the afterlife.

=== M'yrnn J'onzz in other media ===
M'yrnn J'onzz appears in Supergirl, portrayed by Carl Lumbly. This version was captured by the White Martians and coerced into revealing the location of the Staff of Kolar, a psychic weapon believed to be the key to ending a war. After being rescued by Supergirl, Martian Manhunter and Miss Martian, and taken to live in National City on Earth, M'yrnn develops a form of dementia before sacrificing himself to stop Reign from terraforming Earth. Following his death, M'yrnn appears as a spirit and in flashbacks.

== Jefferson Jackson ==
- Further reading: Jefferson Jackson at the Grand Comics Database

Jefferson Jackson is a character appearing in American comic books published by DC Comics. He is a supporting character of Ronnie Raymond (a.k.a. Firestorm) who makes his debut in Firestorm (vol. 2) #1 (June 1982).

Jackson is a former student of Bradley High School in Manhattan, New York. During his time at Bradley High, Jackson joins the school's basketball team, where he meets and befriends Ronnie.

=== Jefferson Jackson in other media ===
- Jefferson "Jax" Jackson appears in media set in the Arrowverse, portrayed by Franz Drameh.
  - Introduced in The Flash episode "The Fury of Firestorm", this version is a former high school football player who was injured when S.T.A.R. Labs' particle accelerator exploded and was forced to become a mechanic instead. Following Ronnie Raymond's death and due to Martin Stein's F.I.R.E.S.T.O.R.M. matrix destabilizing, the Flash and his allies find and recruit Jax to save Stein and become the new Firestorm as all three were similarly affected by the particle accelerator.
  - Jax appears in the second-season premiere of Vixen, voiced by Franz Drameh.
  - Jax appears in Legends of Tomorrow. In the first season, Rip Hunter recruits him and Stein to join his Legends and help defeat Vandal Savage. Despite Jax refusing and Stein bringing him against his will, the former grows to appreciate being part of a team. In the second and third seasons, Stein inadvertently changes the timeline and gives himself a daughter, who goes on to have a son named Ronnie. In light of this, Jax asks his teammate Ray Palmer for help in developing a formula to separate the F.I.R.E.S.T.O.R.M. matrix so the former can use Firestorm's power on his own and allow Stein to be with his family. In "Crisis on Earth-X", Stein is fatally injured while helping the Legends and Earth-1's heroes combat Nazis from Earth-X, but drinks Palmer's formula to save Jax from suffering his fate, sacrificing himself in the process. The distraught Jax leaves the Legends to heal from his grief, though a future version appears in the third-season finale to help them defeat Mallus.

== Jade Tiger ==
- First appearance: Batgirl (2024) #9 (2025)
- Created by: Tate Brombal, Takeshi Miyazawa
- Abilities: Skilled martial artist
- Aliases: Jade Tiger

Jade Tiger, alter-ego Tenji Turner, is a character appearing in American comic books published by DC Comics. He first appears in Batgirl (2024) #9, and was created by writer Tate Brombal and artist Takeshi Miyazawa.

Jade Tiger is the son of Bronze Tiger and Lady Shiva, and thus the half-brother of Cassandra Cain who is of African American, Japanese, and Chinese descent. Sharing the same name as Bronze Tiger's Japanese teacher, O-Sensei, Tenji was trained by both parents and Richard Dragon while his existence was kept secret due to Ben's protective influence.

Shortly before Lady Shiva's apparent death, she alludes for her to find the "Jade Tiger", with the grieving Cassandra first unsure of it until an encounter with Bronze Tiger who then reveals himself as her half-brother. The pair battles both an Unburied assassin and a Blood ninja whom is revealed to be their cousin, the ordeal allowing Ben to give his blessing for Tenji to travel alongside Cassandra and let go his protectiveness.

== Aubrey James ==
Aubrey James is the mayor of Gotham City and a friend of Thomas Wayne. He is later murdered, as mentioned in The Madmen of Gotham.

=== Aubrey James in other media ===
Aubrey James appears in Gotham, portrayed by Richard Kind.

== Java ==
Java is the Neanderthal servant of Simon Stagg. He was first discovered by fortune hunter Rex Mason and revived by the scientific wizardry of Stagg Enterprises. Java is present when Mason discovers the Orb of Ra, which transforms him into Metamorpho. For years, Java has feelings for Simon's daughter Sapphire Stagg, but is unable to win her heart because she is in love with Metamorpho.

During a time when Metamorpho was believed to be dead, Sapphire relents to Java's persistent advances and marries him. Java becomes a father figure to Sapphire and Rex's son, Joey. When Metamorpho returns and retrieves Joey, Java becomes determined to kill him.

=== Java in other media ===
- Java appears in the Justice League episode "Metamorphosis", voiced by Richard Moll.
- Java appears in The Flash episode "Fastest Man Alive", portrayed by Michasha Armstrong. This version is a contemporary African-American human and Stagg Enterprises' head of security who is killed by Multiplex.

== Javelin ==
- First appearance: Green Lantern (vol. 2) #173 (February 1984)
- Created by: Len Wein; Dave Gibbons
- Abilities: Uses gimmicked javelins and other gadgetry
- Aliases: Unknown

Javelin is a former German Olympic athlete who turns to crime, using his athletic skills and a javelin-based weapons arsenal. He later joins the Suicide Squad in exchange for his criminal record being purged.

In Checkmate, Mirror Master recruits Javelin to frame Amanda Waller, during which he attempts to protect Jewelee and is killed after being run over by a runaway jeep.

=== Javelin in other media ===
- The Javelin makes non-speaking cameo appearances in Justice League Unlimited as a member of Gorilla Grodd's Secret Society.
- The Javelin makes a non-speaking cameo appearance in the Batman: The Brave and the Bold episode "Scorn of the Star Sapphire!".
- A character loosely inspired by the Javelin named Malcolm Byrd appears in the Arrow episode "The Demon", portrayed by Yanik Ethier. This version is a French arms dealer and an associate of the Ninth Circle.
- Gunter Braun / Javelin appears in The Suicide Squad, portrayed by Flula Borg. He is recruited into the eponymous group for a mission to Corto Maltese, but is fatally wounded by the local military and bequeaths his namesake to Harley Quinn.

== Jeannette ==
Jeannette is a banshee who was born into a family of impoverished nobility. As a child, she was sent to serve Elizabeth Báthory and forced to watch Báthory's murders with the intent of being her final victim. When Báthory was imprisoned, Jeannette was assigned to care for her. She used the position to slowly murder Báthory by placing ground glass in her food. As an adult, Jeannette became a wealthy married socialite. However, her husband betrayed her to the Revolution and caused Jeannette to become the victim of a botched execution, which led to her mortal death. Jeannette returned to life as a banshee and went on to join the Secret Six.

== Ali Jessop ==
Ali Jessop is an employee of LexCorp.

=== Ali Jessop in other media ===
- Ali Jessop appears in projects set in the DC Universe, portrayed by Bonnie Discepolo. This version is an employee of LuthorCorp.
  - Jessop appears in Superman (2025). Following Ultraman's defeat and Lex Luthor's plot being thwarted, Jessop is arrested.
  - Jessop appears in the second season of Peacemaker, where she is released from prison to work for A.R.G.U.S.

== Jester ==
The Jester is an alias used by several characters appearing in American comic books published by DC Comics.

=== Charles Lane ===
Charles Lane II is the grandson of Chuck Lane (the original Jester). The character was created by Jimmy Palmiotti, Justin Gray and Travis Moore, and first appeared in Freedom Fighters vol. 2 #3 (January 2011).

He was raised and trained in taking on the Jester alias to carry out a complex vendetta against The Arcadians, a group of patriotic radicals who seek to "cleanse" America's "corrupt" governments and murdered his father for rebelling. The Jester and his underlings kidnapped President Martin Suarez's Vice President Marion Allstot as a bargaining chip for several mystical artifacts in order to seize power to be a formidable opponent to the Freedom Fighters, killing Firebrand before Uncle Sam stopped him.

=== Jokester ===
The Jokester (also known as the Jester) is the heroic Earth 3 counterpart of the Joker and father of Duela Dent. The character was created by Paul Dini, Sean McKeever, Keith Giffen and Manuel Garcia, first appeared in Countdown #31 (September 2007).

As the Jokester, he is the nemesis of Owlman and Talon while impeding the Crime Syndicate before he fell in as an extra-dimensional traveler alongside Donna Troy, Jason Todd and Kyle Rayner, who he sacrificed his life for during a conflict between the Monitors and Lord Havok.

==== Jester in other media ====
- The alternate universe version of the Jester appears in Batman: The Brave and the Bold, voiced by Jeff Bennett. This version utilizes the Red Hood identity.
- The alternate universe version of the Jester appears in Justice League: Crisis on Two Earths, voiced by James Patrick Stuart.

== Jezebel Jet ==
Jezebel Jet is a wealthy former supermodel of African descent. She is said to own an African province. Like Bruce, she lost her parents at a young age. Though she resisted Bruce's affections at first, she ultimately began a relationship with him. As a result, she discovered that Bruce was Batman just before Batman R.I.P.. Later, she is revealed to be a member of the Black Glove, a villainous organization aimed at defeating Batman. While on her airplane, Jezebel is apparently killed by the Man-Bat Commandos.

=== Jezebel Jet in other media ===
A character based on Jezebel appears in Batwoman, portrayed by Robin Givens. Jada Jet is the CEO of Jeturian Industries, an associate of the Black Glove Society, and the mother of Marquis Jet and Ryan Wilder.

== Rhea Jones ==
Rhea Jones is a character appearing in American comic books published by DC Comics. After tagging along with her father to a government base in the Arctic, an explosion involving a powerful radioactive electromagnet killed her father and granted her electromagnetic abilities. Rather than stick around and be dissected and experimented on by the army, she ran away and joined the circus. After a few years, Rhea was recruited by Celsius to join her new Doom Patrol as Lodestone.

At the start of Grant Morrison's run on Doom Patrol, Rhea was put into a coma that would last until halfway into the series. While in the hospital, she is kidnapped by Red Jack, who intends to marry her. As Jack battles the Doom Patrol, Rhea awakens from her coma and stabs Jack in the back, then immediately becomes comatose again. Niles Caulder later determines that Rhea's coma is the result of an ongoing metamorphosis, with her body being akin to a chrysalis.

After her metamorphosis is complete, Rhea emerges from her human body as a Lodestone, a being in tune with the Earth's electromagnetic waves. Following her metamorphosis, Rhea's face becomes blank and her eyes are moved to her chest and back.

=== Rhea Jones in other media ===
- Rhea Jones makes a cameo appearance in the Batman: The Brave and the Bold episode "The Last Patrol!" as part of a poster advertising a carnival's freak show.
- Rhea Jones / Lodestone appears in the Doom Patrol episode "Doom Patrol Patrol", portrayed by Lesa Wilson as a young woman and an uncredited actress as an old woman. This version was a member of a 1950s incarnation of the Doom Patrol before they were defeated by Mr. Nobody and disbanded. As most of the team were left mentally ill following the battle, Joshua Clay became their caretaker.

== Tao Jones ==
Tao Jones is among the children who were experimented on by Doctor Love while they were still in their mother's womb, giving her the ability to fly and create force fields. Love raised the six children in isolation until they learned of their origins, upon which they killed Love and struck out on their own as the group Helix. Jones was reintroduced in the series Suicide Squad (2018), where she was killed in action as part of the Suicide Squad.

=== Tao Jones in other media ===
Tao Jones appears in the Stargirl episode "Frenemies – Chapter Eight: Infinity Inc. Part Two", portrayed by Andi Ju. This version is a patient at the Helix Institute for Youth Rehabilitation partnered with Kritter.

== Jongleur ==
Jongleur was a supervillain and member of the Superior Five. He was a sinister counterpart of Merryman of the Inferior Five. Together with his teammates, he was exiled on Cygnus 4019.

== Martin Jordan ==
Martin Jordan was created by Jim Owsley and M. D. Bright and first appeared in Green Lantern: Emerald Dawn #1 (December 1989). The father of Hal Jordan, Martin was a decorated Air Force veteran and worked as a test pilot for Ferris Aircraft until his death in a plane crash. The loss of his father leaves a permanent scar on Hal's psyche, making him fearless and thus a suitable choice for the role of a Green Lantern.

=== Martin Jordan in other media ===
- Martin Jordan appears in Green Lantern, portrayed by Jon Tenney.
- Martin Jordan appears in Lanterns, portrayed by Jake B. Miller. He is depicted as suffering from depression and is implied to have committed suicide when Hal was a child, with his death being covered up as an accident.

== Jumpa ==
Jumpa is a character appearing in American comic books published by DC Comics.

On Earth-Two, Jumpa is a Kanga, a flying kangaroo-like creature and friend of Wonder Woman who serves as her mode of transportation on Themyscira.

In Infinite Frontier, a flashback to Wonder Woman's childhood had her working to train Jumpa while riding through Themyscira. However, she is rejected and thrown into the ocean before Hippolyta rescues her.

=== Jumpa in other media ===
- Jumpa appears in the Teen Titans Go! episode "Justice League's Next Top Talent Idol Star: Justice League Edition".
- Jumpa appears in DC Super Hero Girls.

== Judge ==
The Judge is an alias used by several characters appearing in American comic books published by DC Comics. Each iteration is usually depicted as a cloaked figure who sports a courtroom robe, blindfold and mallet-sized gavel while opposing superheroes, such as Batman, Green Lantern and the Flash.

=== First version ===
==== Judge Clay ====
Judge Clay is a judge in Gotham City with a scar on his hand. The character first appeared in Detective Comics #441 (July 1974), and was created by Archie Goodwin and Howard Chaykin. Clay's corruption accidentally caused his daughter Melissa Clay's accidental blinding so the Judge blamed Batman and kidnapped Robin as bait involving various trap-based weapons in an abandoned summer resort. The Dynamic Duo defeated the Judge before his daughter's accidental death to which he surrendered.

==== Jacob de Witt ====
DC Rebirth revamps the character as Jacob de Witt, a 17th-century blind immortal judge with the ability to see corruption in people's hearts. The character first appeared in Nightwing (vol. 4) #35 (February 2018), and was created by Sam Humphries and Bernard Chang. De Witt operates in the present as the Judge, a serial killer who sports sunglasses in Blüdhaven until he is defeated by Dick Grayson.

=== Sheko ===
The New 52 features Sheko, a member of the Red Lantern Corps from the planet Primeen. The character first appeared in Red Lanterns #30 (June 2014), and was created by Charles Soule, Jim Calafiore and Alessandro Vitti. Sheko served as a judge who gets disillusioned over the decades as Primeen's justice system came to favor the corrupt elite. Passing a guilty judgment on prince Karsik resulted in her bribed bailiff Parthu shooting Sheko who is chosen by a power ring as the Judge, enacting her own form of justice across her planet. Her actions brought the attention of Guy Gardner and Atrocitus to recruit her to opposing Red Lantern factions. The Judge insisted on hearing all sides before her judgment culminates in her suicide attack.

=== Hunter Zolomon ===
Hunter Zolomon is the Judge in Central City. Manipulated by Eobard Thawne in order to antagonize Barry Allen and Wally West, he is a cloaked figure who sends the 25th-century Renegades back in time, and a speedster empowered with the Sage Force, the Strength Force and the Still Force in conjunction with the Forever Force.

=== Judge in other media ===
- An original incarnation of the Judge appears in The Adventures of Batman episode "Enter the Judge", voiced by Ted Knight. This version is an unnamed master criminal who stole a judge's outfit after being denied parole and forms the Cosgrove gang as a jury out of different criminals to punish anyone who opposes crime.
- An original incarnation of the Judge appears in The New Batman Adventures episode "Judgment Day", voiced by Malachi Throne. This version is the third alternate personality of Harvey Dent / Two-Face who operates as a violent court-themed vigilante.
- An original incarnation of the Judge appears as a boss in DC Universe Online. This version resembles the Grim Reaper and utilizes a dagger-axe.

== Judomaster ==
Judomaster is the name of several superheroes appearing in American comic books published by DC Comics. Originally owned by Charlton Comics, the character was acquired by DC Comics in 1983.

=== Rip Jagger ===
Ripley "Rip" Jagger, a sergeant in World War II in the United States Army. He rescued the daughter of a Pacific island chief and, in return, was taught the martial art of judo. He had a kid sidekick named Tiger who later became Nightshade's martial arts instructor as an adult. Jagger was created by writer Joe Gill and artist Frank McLaughlin; McLaughlin created the character at a time when he intended to leave Charlton and work freelance. Charlie Santangelo, the head of Charlton and a friend of McLaughlin, helped him publish Judomaster, who was inspired by McLaughlin and Santangelo's shared interest in judo.

After DC Comics acquired Judomaster, the character was reimagined as a member of the All-Star Squadron. His sidekick Tiger was re-imagined as the villain Avatar in the L.A.W. miniseries published by DC Comics, which starred several Charlton characters.

During the Infinite Crisis storyline, Judomaster is killed by Bane.

=== Andreas Havoc ===
Andreas Havoc, an enemy of Thunderbolt, challenged Thunderbolt to battle, feeling that his rightful position as "Vajra" had been stolen by him. The Blue Beetle, Captain Atom, and Nightshade assisted Thunderbolt in battling Havoc in a psychic battle while a new, never-named Judomaster helped rescue the heroes in the physical world.

=== Thomas Jagger ===
Thomas "Tommy" Jagger is the son of Ripley Jagger, from whom he inherited the name Judomaster. Thomas is a high-ranking field agent within the organization Checkmate, within which he is known as the White Knight. Following his father's death, Thomas confronts his killer Bane, but decides against avenging his father.

=== Sonia Sato ===
Sonia Sato is introduced in the Birds of Prey series as a member of the eponymous group. Sonia is a metahuman with the ability to project an "aversion field" which prevents her from being hit by attacks specifically aimed at her. This does not include attacks that have no aim, such as random projectiles and explosions. With the help of the Justice Society of America, she stops yakuza assassins led by Tiger. Sonia is in a relationship with Damage, kissing him even after his temporarily healed face was reverted to his heavily scarred one. Sonia's romance with Damage is ended when he is killed by the reanimated Jean Loring during Blackest Night. Sonia and Atom Smasher search the city for survivors, only to encounter Damage, who has been resurrected as a Black Lantern.

In Doomsday Clock, Judomaster appears as a member of Big Monster Action.

=== Judomaster in other media ===
- Sonia Sato appears in the Stargirl episode "Summer School: Chapter Ten", portrayed by Kristen Lee. This version is a Blue Valley citizen who runs a coffee stand.
- The Rip Jagger incarnation of Judomaster appears in Peacemaker, portrayed by Nhut Le. This version is a gay Vietnamese-American Buddhist and founding member of Checkmate. Additionally, he wears a green suit instead of red and white to represent Le's cultural background.
- Ripley Jagger appears in Batman: Soul of the Dragon, voiced by Chris Cox. This version is a student of O-Sensei and member of the Kobra cult. He kills Jade to unleash Nāga from his dimension before being killed by his demonic servants.
- The Sonia Sato incarnation of Judomaster appears as a character summon in Scribblenauts Unmasked: A DC Comics Adventure.
- The Rip Jagger incarnation of Judomaster, based on Nhut Le's portrayal, appears as a playable character in DC Worlds Collide.
