= Ravan (comics) =

DC Comics character

- Ravan as depicted in Suicide Squad #45 (September 1990). Art by Geof Isherwood (penciller/inker) and Carl Gafford (colorist).

Publication information
- Publisher: DC Comics
- First appearance: Suicide Squad #1 (May 1987)
- Created by: John Ostrander (writer); Luke McDonnell (artist)

In-story information
- Team affiliations: Suicide Squad; Jihad; Black Lantern Corps
- Abilities: Martial arts proficiency

Ravan is a supervillain appearing in American comic books published by DC Comics. His first appearance was in Suicide Squad #1 (1987), and was created by John Ostrander and Luke McDonnell.

== Publication history ==
Ravan first appears as a member of the villainous mercenary team Jihad (later renamed Onslaught). In an encounter with the Bronze Tiger his back was broken. He re-appears alongside Onslaught in Suicide Squad #17, and is recruited for the Suicide Squad in his second encounter with Bronze Tiger.

== Fictional character biography ==
Ravan is an Indian thuggee who aims to stop the coming of Kali and thereby the Kali Yuga, the Age of Chaos, by killing for Kali. In doing so, he delays the coming of Kali for another thousand years. It is through this practice that he both prevents and worships Kali. His primary enemy is the villain Kobra, who wishes to bring forth the Age of Chaos.

Ravan joins the Suicide Squad to continue his efforts while being sponsored by the American government. He develops a strange friendship with Bronze Tiger, whom he swears to kill for his earlier defeats, but the two also form an effective team. During the Janus Directive, when Waller must make it seem like she is being controlled by Kobra, she sends the squad after the Force of July. During the battle, Ravan kills Mayflower, a respected member of the Force of July.

With her superiors on the verge of disbanding the Suicide Squad, Amanda Waller gathers Ravan, Poison Ivy, and Deadshot in an assassination mission targeting the LOA, which is planning to create a zombie army. The deal for the villains is simple: the three will help Waller in killing the LOA and afterward they are set free.

The mission succeeds, and Waller is imprisoned on charges of murder. Ravan leaves for London, where he sets up a 'cyberchurch' as a front for his assassination organization. A year later, Batman kidnaps Ravan to join the new Suicide Squad, also run by Waller.

With this Squad, Ravan goes to Israel to capture Kobra, but Kobra has already been captured by the Israeli team Hayoth. Ravan easily manipulates one of their agents, thereby giving him access to their highly advanced A.I. computer Dybbuk. Ravan faces Kobra in combat, but Kobra has the upper hand and fatally poisons him.

During the Blackest Night storyline, Ravan is reanimated as a member of the Black Lantern Corps alongside several other dead Suicide Squad members. Ravan is destroyed by the Manhunter's self-destruct mechanism, which unleashes an explosion of Green Lantern energy that eradicates the Black Lanterns.

== Other versions ==
Ravan makes a minor appearance in Injustice: Gods Among Us as a prisoner of the Trench facility.

== In other media ==
- Ravan makes a non-speaking cameo appearance in the Arrow episode "Unthinkable", portrayed by Viv Leacock. This version is a reserve member of the A.R.G.U.S. Squad.
- Ravan appears in the non-canonical Arrow tie-in comic Arrow: Season 2.5. This version is a member of the Suicide Squad and an inmate of Guantánamo Bay.
