= The Longbow Hunters (disambiguation) =

The Longbow Hunters is the name a fictional group featured in DC Comics books.

The Longbow Hunters may also refer to:

- The Longbow Hunters (Arrowverse), a fictional group appearing in the Arrowverse television franchise
- Green Arrow: The Longbow Hunters, is a three-issue comic book miniseries published in 1987 by DC Comics
- "The Longbow Hunters" (Arrow episode), an episode of Arrow
