= List of DC Comics characters: O =

== Chief O'Hara ==
- First appearance: World's Finest Comics #159 (August 1966)
- Created by: Edmond Hamilton and Curt Swan
- Further reading: Chief O'Hara at the Comic Book DB (archived from the original); Chief O'Hara at the Grand Comics Database

Chief Miles Clancy O'Hara is a member of the Gotham City Police Department in the DC Universe based on the character of the same name from the television series Batman, portrayed by Stafford Repp.

The character, as adapted by Edmond Hamilton and Curt Swan, first appeared in the DC Universe in World's Finest Comics #159 (August 1966).

Within the context of the stories, Chief O'Hara is the chief of police during the early days of Batman's career. O'Hara was the first victim of the Hangman serial killer.

=== Alternate versions of Chief O'Hara ===
- Chief O'Hara appears in Tiny Titans.
- Chief O'Hara appears in Batman: The Brave and the Bold #17.

=== Chief O'Hara in other media ===
- Chief O'Hara appears in Batman with Robin the Boy Wonder, voiced by Casey Kasem.
- Chief O'Hara appears in Batman: Return of the Caped Crusaders and Batman vs. Two-Face, voiced by Thomas Lennon.
- Chief O'Hara's daughter, Chief O'Hara II, appears in The Lego Batman Movie, voiced by Lauren White.
- Chief O'Hara II appears in Batman '66.

== O-Sensei ==
O-Sensei is a fictional character in the DC Comics Universe. He first appeared in Dragon's Fists, a novel by Dennis O'Neil and Jim Berry, later being incorporated into the comics beginning with Richard Dragon, Kung Fu Fighter #1 (May 1975).

O-Sensei was originally a Japanese army captain in the 1890s who left after one of his soldiers killed a Chinese prisoner. In memory of him, the captain began training in martial arts and ancient disciplines, coming to train Bronze Tiger and Richard Dragon in the present day. Eventually, O-Sensei seeks the aid of Lady Shiva, Batman, Green Arrow, and the Question in returning to Japan to fulfill a vow to his late wife, only to be killed by a typhoon.

=== O-Sensei in other media ===
O-Sensei appears in Batman: Soul of the Dragon, voiced by James Hong. This version is the caretaker of Nanda Parbat who, prior to the film's events, previously trained Lady Shiva, Batman, Jade, and Rip Jagger in addition to Bronze Tiger and Richard Dragon and sacrificed himself to close the gateway to Nāga's dimension. In the present, Nāga possesses O-Sensei's corpse before Richard banishes him using the Soul Breaker sword.

== Odd Man ==
Odd Man, real name Clay Stoner, is a private detective living in River City. He has blue eyes and blond hair which changes to black hair when he acts as a vigilante wearing mismatched clothing under the name the Odd Man. He uses his wits and an elaborate series of gadgets to disorient and confuse his opponents. These include a weighted extended tie, a spray he developed which melts certain plastics, gloves that emit powder or smoke when he claps his hands together, and a slippery oil spray. He also has the ability to make his enemies black out, presumably through the use of one of his sprays or concoctions.

== Ogre ==
Ogre is a DC Comics character who appeared in Batman #535 (October 1996), created by Doug Moench and Kelley Jones. Ogre is a genetically altered man, whose brother is a genetically experimented ape created by Doctor Winston Belmont. The man, Michael Adams, was increased in strength and the Ape in intelligence. The project created by Belmont was Project Mirakle, a top secret government project at Atsugi, where there were tested spy planes, as well as experiments on humans in the late 1950s. These experiments were made to create the perfect human agent but when funding was excavated so were the subjects. Michael Adams, as 23rd human experiment, managed to escape after 22 previous deaths. The Ogre tracked and murdered the scientists who collaborated with the project, only to be tracked by Batman himself. In the end, the Ape died and the Ogre wandered the city alone in a story analogous to Mary Shelley's Frankenstein.

=== Ogre in other media ===
A character based on Ogre appears in Gotham, portrayed by Milo Ventimiglia. This version is Jason Skolimski, the son of Jacob Skolimski, a butler who worked for the affluent Constance van Groot; and an unnamed mother who left the family, leaving Jason to believe that Van Groot is his mother. After Van Groot rejected him, Jason killed her in anger, stole her money, and underwent plastic surgery with help from a nurse named Julie Kimble, who he later killed. Over the next decade, he adopted the alias of "Jason Lennon" and became a serial killer targeting young and attractive successful women, kidnapping and keeping them for weeks or months and later murdering and dumping them in various places of Gotham, leaving behind a hand-made drawing of a broken heart. Due to their loved ones being threatened, the Gotham City Police Department (GCPD) allow Jason to continue unimpeded, giving him the nicknames the "Ogre" and the "Don Juan Killer". Throughout the episodes "Beasts of Prey", "Under the Knife" and "The Anvil or the Hammer", Jim Gordon and Harvey Bullock attempt to stop Jason, who kidnaps Barbara Kean and forces her to commit a murder. Though Gordon and Bullock kill Jason and save Barbara, she is left psychologically shaken.

== Oggar ==
Oggar, the World's Mightiest Immortal, is a fictional character from the publisher Fawcett Comics, whose publication rights were acquired by DC Comics in the 1970s. He first appeared in Captain Marvel Adventures # 61 (May 1946, Fawcett Comics). His last appearance in DC Comics was in World's Finest Comics # 264 (August 1980). He was a major recurring enemy of the Marvels in stories published before the Crisis on Infinite Earths continuity reboot, and has not appeared since then.

Oggar is a former pupil of the wizard Shazam and a member of the pantheon that empowers him. After rebelling against Shazam, Oggar is banished to Earth and learns that Shazam will eventually die and give his powers to Billy Batson. During his exile, Oggar meets the witch Circe and gives her immortality, but in his enmity to her, deliberately did not include eternal youth as well and she suffered the results of extreme age. After returning in the 20th century, Oggar becomes an enemy of the Marvel Family. He fights Captain Marvel while trying to gather members for his Cult of the Curse, however is only able to get four recruits, who all eventually leave. Oggar finally encounters Circe, who turns him into a boar and he falls off a cliff, apparently to his death. Many years later he recovers and joins the Monster Society of Evil. However, the Marvel Family is by this time aware of his magic's inability to directly harm women and so Mary Marvel is assigned to deal with him. When he joins the Monster Society's assault on the Rock of Eternity, Mary Marvel is able to bind and gag him.

== Janie Olsen ==
Janie Olsen is a fictional character appearing in American comic books published by DC Comics. She first appeared in Superman's Pal, Jimmy Olsen (vol. 2) #5 as part of the "DC Universe" initiative and was created by Matt Fraction and Steve Lieber.

Janie Olsen is a playwright who is the sister of Jimmy Olsen.

=== Janie Olsen in other media ===
A character based on Janie Olsen named Janet Olsen appears in Superman & Lois, portrayed by Yoshi Bancroft. She is depicted as Jimmy Olsen's sister who worked as a reporter at the Daily Planet during her early days before becoming a camera operator for GBS and a senior correspondent for the Daily Planet. Additionally, Bancroft also portrays Janet's Inverse World counterpart.

== Onyx ==
Onyx (Onyx Adams) is a fictional character appearing in American comic books published by DC Comics. She appeared in Detective Comics #546 (January 1985), created by Joey Cavalieri and Jerome K. Moore.

A former member of the League of Assassins, Onyx forsook the group and joined the same monastery that Green Arrow once belonged to. When the order's master was killed, Onyx sought Green Arrow to take down his killer.

During the Batman: War Games story arc, Onyx joins the Hill Gang led by Orpheus. She later assumes leadership of the group after Orpheus is killed by Black Mask.

In The New 52 continuity reboot, Onyx appears as a member of the Outsiders.

=== Onyx in other media ===
- Onyx Adams appears in the Arrow episode "Next of Kin", portrayed by Chastity Dotson. This version is a former member of the League of Assassins from 1743 who used a Lazarus Pit to survive into the present and become a black ops agent in Syria before several members of her team betrayed her. She forms a new team to kill the defectors, but is defeated by John Diggle and his allies and arrested by the police.
- Onyx makes a non-speaking appearance in Batman: Bad Blood. This version is a member of Leviathan who expresses romantic feelings for her superior Heretic despite being frustrated by his lack of emotions. In hopes of fixing this, she and Heretic kidnap Damian Wayne in an attempt to absorb his memories, only for Talia al Ghul to kill Heretic. Onyx subsequently seeks revenge on Talia, attacking her on a hovercraft and causing the vessel to crash and explode.
- A teenage Onyx Adams appears in Young Justice, voiced by Logan Browning. This version was raised by her maternal grandfather Amazing-Man, but ran away from home due to her fear of not being able to live up to his moral standards and was recruited by Sensei to join the League of Shadows. In the present, Onyx comes to regret running away and is manipulated by the League into defecting from them and cause confusion for the Team. After joining forces with Artemis Crock and Cheshire to rescue Orphan, Onyx stays on Infinity Island for rehabilitation.

== Orana ==
Orana is a fictional character who appears in comics produced by DC Comics. Orana is a red-haired Amazon who challenges and defeats Princess Diana for the title of Wonder Woman in WW issue #250 (December 1978). Orana adopts the self-imposed title as the "New Wonder Woman" and departs Paradise Island for New York City. She is killed in action shortly into her reign and allows Diana to reclaim the role as Wonder Woman.

Orana's appearance, mannerisms and storyline served as the inspiration for a future red-haired Wonder Woman, Artemis.

In Wonder Woman #98 (May 1958), which is a retelling of Wonder Woman's origin, a red-haired Amazon named Orana asks Queen Hippolyta if the queen will be fair during the judging of the tournament to determine who will become Wonder Woman. This Orana, however, displays none of the tendencies of the character that appears in Wonder Woman #250–254.

== Pytor Orloff ==
Dr. Pytor Orloff is a fictional character appearing in American comic books published by DC Comics. The character, created by Mike Baron and Jackson Guice, first appeared in The Flash vol. 2 #7 (December 1987). He is a scientist behind the Blue Trinity speedsters, as well as Speed Demon's recovery.

=== Pytor Orloff in other media ===
The character appears in The Flash episode "The Curious Case of Bartholomew Allen", portrayed by Jeff Meadows.

== Elias Orr ==
Elias Orr is a fictional character appearing in American comic books published by DC Comics. He was created by Brian Azzarello and Jim Lee during the arc of Superman: For Tomorrow.

Introduced in Lex Luthor: Man of Steel, Orr under Lex Luthor's employ assigned Toyman to stage an attack on Luthor's Hope, a genetically engineered superhuman. Revealed in For Tomorrow, he is a black-ops specialist working in the field of cybernetics labeled Project M helped to create Equus to battle Superman, as well as transforming Ron Evers, a friend of Vic Stone / Cyborg into a weapon. While confronting the Teen Titans, Orr encountered Cyborg and a villainous futuristic version of him called Cyborg 2.0. They created a "Cyborg Revenge Squad" consisting of Shrapnel, Gizmo, Magenta, Girder, Thinker, and Cyborgirl. Orr and his Cyborg Revenge Squad were defeated and his Project destroyed.

=== Elias Orr in other media ===
Elias Orr appears in Superman & Lois, portrayed by Christian Sloan. This version is a fixer for Intergang who is accidentally killed by Peia Mannheim after she loses control of her powers.

== Otis ==
- First appearance: Superman (1978 film); Comics: Superman Returns: Prequel Comic #3 (August 2006, non-canon); Forever Evil #2 (December 2013, canon)
- Created by: Mario Puzo; David Newman; Leslie Newman; Robert Benton; Tom Mankiewicz

Otis is Lex Luthor's bumbling henchman from the films Superman (1978) and Superman II (1980), portrayed by Ned Beatty. Since his initial appearance, Otis has been utilized in several media adaptations, often taking on different positions and titles.

=== Films ===
In Superman (1978), Otis assists Lex Luthor in his plot to steal two nuclear test missiles from the United States military and use them in a real estate scheme, only to be foiled by Superman and incarcerated in the same penitentiary as Luthor.

In Superman II, Otis attempts to join Luthor in escaping from prison. However, he is abandoned for weighing down Eve Teschmacher's hot air balloon.

=== Otis in comics ===
- Otis appears in Forever Evil #2 (December 2013) as a LexCorp security guard who is killed by Bizarro.
- Otis appears in a flashback in Superman Returns: Prequel Comic #3.
- Otis appears in the Young Justice tie-in comic book.

=== Alternate versions of Otis ===
Otis appears in Superman Family Adventures.

=== Otis in other media ===
- A character based on Otis named Orville Gump appears in The World's Greatest Super Friends episode "Lex Luthor Strikes Back", voiced by William Callaway.
- Otis appears in the Smallville episode "Scare", portrayed by Malcolm Stewart. This version is Otis Ford, a scientist employed by LuthorCorp.
  - Another Otis appears in Smallville Season 11. This version is Otis Berg, Lex Luthor's personal assistant at LexCorp who is killed by the Monitor.
- Otis appears in the Young Justice episode "Satisfaction", voiced by Kevin Michael Richardson. This version is Otis Beatty, the head of Lex Luthor's security force.
- Otis appears in Supergirl, portrayed by Robert Baker. This version is Otis Graves, Mercy Graves's brother and a former agent of Project Cadmus who provided Ben Lockwood with the means to become Agent Liberty. After being seemingly killed by Hellgrammite, Otis is converted by Lex Luthor into a Metallo, but is eventually killed by Lockwood. After the crossover "Crisis on Infinite Earths", Otis is revived as a human and found work with Lillian Luthor.
  - Additionally, an alternate timeline version of Otis appears in the episode "It's a Super Life".
- Otis appears in Superman & Lois, portrayed by Ryan Booth. This version is Otis Grisham, an inmate at Stryker's Prison. Otis later assists Lex Luthor and Cheryl Kimble in experimenting on Bizarro and abducting Sam Lane, respectively. Otis attempts to assassinate Mayor Lana Lang, only to be thwarted by Sarah Cortez and taken into the Department of Defense's custody. Otis is later stated to have been found hanging in his cell before he could meet a prosecutor.
- Otis appears in media set in the DC Universe, portrayed by Terence Rosemore. This version is Otis Berg, Lex Luthor's assistant at LuthorCorp.
  - First appearing in Superman (2025), Otis Berg assists Sydney Happersen in releasing a Kaiju in Metropolis and later helps to control Ultraman in fighting Superman. Following Ultraman's defeat, Otis and other Lex Luthor associates are arrested.
  - Otis appears in the Peacemaker episode "Full Nelson", where he is recruited into A.R.G.U.S.

== Overgirl ==
Overgirl is the name of two supervillains who have appeared in American comic books published by DC Comics as counterparts of Supergirl and Superwoman. Created by Grant Morrison and appearing in the Final Crisis and The Multiversity: Mastermen stories, both characters are inhabitants of Earth-10 where the Nazis achieved world domination.

The first version is a Kryptonian clone of Overman who fights alongside her "cousin" and the Monitors but dies.

The second version is Lena Kant, the wife of Overman who has maintained eternal youth for decades before being killed by the Freedom Fighters.

=== Overgirl in other media ===
Two versions of Overgirl appear in media set in the Arrowverse, portrayed by Melissa Benoist. Each version is a doppelgänger of Kara Zor-El.

- One version (also known as Red Daughter, Snowbird, and Linda Lee) appears in Supergirl. This version was created after Supergirl was exposed to black kryptonite. She ends up in Siberia and secretly trained by the Soviet military in Kaznia before being taken in and manipulated by Lex Luthor. After learning of Luthor's villainy, she sacrifices herself to save Kara and help defeat Luthor.
- Another version is an Earth-X doppelgänger who appears in Freedom Fighters: The Ray and the "Crisis on Earth-X" crossover. She is the wife of the Führer Dark Arrow, and a leading member of the New Reichsmen.
