= Emiko Queen =

Fictional superhero in DC Comics

- Emiko Queen as Red Arrow on the variant cover artwork of Teen Titans #30 (May 2019). Art by Alex Garner.

Publication information
- Publisher: DC Comics
- First appearance: Green Arrow, Vol. 5 #18 (March 2013); As Green Arrow: Green Arrow, Vol. 5 #32 (June 2014); As Red Arrow: Green Arrow, Vol. 6 #15 (January 2017)
- Created by: Jeff Lemire; Andrea Sorrentino

In-story information
- Alter ego: Emiko Queen
- Species: Human
- Team affiliations: Team Arrow; Teen Titans; Justice League; Ninth Circle
- Notable aliases: Green Arrow; Red Arrow; Emiko Lacroix
- Abilities: Expert archer and markswoman; Skilled martial artist, hand-to-hand combatant, and acrobat

Emiko Queen is a superheroine appearing in American comic books published by DC Comics. The character was created by writer Jeff Lemire and artist Andrea Sorrentino and debuted in Green Arrow, Vol. 5 #18 (March 2013). She is the younger paternal half-sister and sidekick of Green Arrow. Emiko has been associated with the mantle of Green Arrow, but is more commonly known as the second Red Arrow.

Emiko Queen appears in Arrow, portrayed by Sea Shimooka.

== Publication history ==
Emiko debuted in The New 52's Green Arrow, Vol. 5 #18 (March 2013), written by Jeff Lemire and designed by artist Andrea Sorrentino. The character was created as a parallel to Thea Queen, an original character to the Arrowverse and the younger maternal half-sister of Oliver Queen from The CW series Arrow.

While Emiko originally addresses herself as the new Green Arrow before joining her brother's crusade, it is not until later during DC Rebirth that, after her apparent betrayal, Emiko would return and take on her own codename as Red Arrow, one previously held by Roy Harper during his membership in the Justice League in the Pre-Flashpoint era.

== Fictional character biography ==
=== The New 52 ===
Emiko is the paternal half-sister of Oliver Queen/Green Arrow who is the illegitimate daughter of his father Robert Queen and the assassin Shado. Kept secret from the Queen family by her mother, as an infant Emiko was kidnapped by Simon Lacroix/Komodo, Robert's former associate. He raised her as an assassin, believing him to be her father. Emiko watches as Komodo kills Green Arrow's associate Jax Jackson, and later reports that their other hostage Naomi Singh had managed to locate where Oliver Queen currently is. After Green Arrow rescues Shado from Count Vertigo, Emiko confirms to him that Emiko is her daughter.

Emiko then appears during the Outsiders War storyline where, upon hearing that Shado is accompanying Green Arrow, she asked Komodo if it was true that her mother is still alive and is upset for having been lied to, but he tricks her into thinking that Green Arrow and Shado are only coming to take her away from him. Later, after Robert Queen was injured during their pursuit of them, Emiko begins to realize the truth that she is actually his daughter, something which Shado confirms, to which an angry Emiko exacts her vengeance by killing Komodo. Upon rejecting his position to become the head of the Outsiders Arrow Clan, Oliver offers that he'll take Emiko away from all of this for a fresh start, which Shado agrees as it is her choice to make.

Emiko decides to follow her brother back to Seattle as she recognizes that, unlike the rest, her brother had never lied to her and when he is attacked by the Longbow Hunters, she introduces herself as Green Arrow.

=== DC Rebirth ===
Oliver and Shado get into a fight in Oliver's apartment, with Oliver getting the upper hand. Oliver orders Emiko to get out of the apartment, but she fires an arrow into his back. Emiko and Shado flee in a boat and discard Oliver's body in the middle of the ocean. After Oliver turns up alive, Emiko conducts a plan for the Ninth Circle to capture Black Canary. When Emiko and Shado are about to kill Black Canary, Emiko rescues her instead, revealing that she had been a double agent. Emiko goes on to join the Teen Titans.

=== The New Golden Age ===
In the series "The New Golden Age", Red Arrow and Stargirl visit the house of Dan Dunbar and find that he has been researching the whereabouts of the Lost Children - thirteen superheroes who mysteriously disappeared. After traveling to the Diablo Triangle where Dunbar was last seen, Red Arrow and Stargirl end up shipwrecked on an island. Red Arrow is abducted by robots called Child Collectors and taken to a prison, where she encounters several of the Lost Children. Red Arrow, Stargirl, and the Lost Children manage to escape after stopping the Childminder, their captor. Hourman takes the Lost Children to the present day, stating that returning them to their original time periods would cause a time paradox.

== Powers and abilities ==
Emiko Queen has no superhuman abilities. Under the tutelage of Simon Lacroix, Emiko became a skilled archer and a disciplined fighter.

== In other media ==
Emiko Queen appears in Arrow, portrayed by Sea Shimooka. This version is the adult daughter of Robert Queen and Kazumi Adachi and the leader of the terrorist organization, the Ninth Circle, who recruited and trained her after Robert abandoned her. Throughout the seventh season, she seeks to destroy Robert's legacy as well as revenge on his son and her half-brother, Oliver Queen. In pursuit of this, she initially operates as the Green Arrow and assists Team Arrow in protecting Star City while Oliver is imprisoned before her true allegiances and goals are exposed. After failing to destroy Star City, the Ninth Circle's council betrays her and she is mortally wounded. Before she dies, she reconciles with Oliver. After Oliver sacrifices himself to save the multiverse and due to changes made to it during the events of the crossover, "Crisis on Infinite Earths", Emiko was resurrected off-screen as of the series finale "Fadeout", during which she attends Oliver's funeral and is welcomed into the Queen family.
