= Onslaught (DC Comics) =

Comic book terrorist organization

- Clockwise from the right Chimera, Ravan, Manticore, Jaculi, Djinn, Rustam; art by Luke McDonnell.

Publication information
- Publisher: DC Comics
- First appearance: Suicide Squad #1 (May 1987)
- Created by: John Ostrander (writer); Luke McDonnell (artist)

In-story information
- Base(s): Qurac
- Member(s): Roster below

The Onslaught are a fictional team of state sponsored super powered Quraci terrorists appearing in American comic books published by DC Comics. They first appeared in Suicide Squad #1, and were created by John Ostrander and Luke McDonnell.

== History ==
The Onslaught is a team of super-powered international terrorists-for-hire operating out of the outlaw nation of Qurac. The team was created and guided by Qurac's president Hurrambi Marlo and had accepted, as its first commission, the assignment of killing the President of the United States. Former Suicide Squad member Jess Bright, now a Soviet operative named Koshchei, helped bio-engineer candidates for the team. At its inception, the Jihad was infiltrated by Nemesis and Nightshade, members of the advance team of the Suicide Squad, and was the target of a preemptive attack by the Squad (as seen in Suicide Squad #1 and #2).

After their first clash with the Suicide Squad, Raza Kattuah now calling himself Rustam formed a second team based in an old World War II fortress called Jotunheim in southern Qurac. The name translates as "Land of the Giants", because the Germans believed only a race of giants could have built those mountains. Rustam used this team to terrorize civilians in New York City. Ravan, Ifrit and Agni were captured. Manticore and Jaculi were killed, but Rustam and Badb were able to escape. Ravan was eventually recruited by the Suicide Squad. Rick Flag carried out an unauthorized solo mission to Qurac which resulted in the destruction of Jotunheim, killing Rustam and countless Jihad members. The man known as Kobra would later kill Ravan in single combat.

Amanda Waller briefs the Suicide Squad, art by Luke McDonnell.

Agni assembled a small three-person team to free President Marlo from United States custody. He brought along Badb, and the Atlantean renegade Piscator, a self-styled Janissary. The Suicide Squad preemptively substituted Nemesis for Marlo. At the same time, Israel's heroes, the Mossad superteam known as the Hayoth were involved in a covert mission on U.S. soil, a failed attempt to abduct Marlo.

As revealed in Suicide Squad #50, Jess Bright had survived the Yeti attack in Tibet, that killed most of the original Suicide Squad. Jess was rescued by the Red Chinese and given a new name Yen Wang (King of the Devils) and was made the head of a secret Chinese project to develop metahumans alongside a Chinese scientist named Deng Zho-Zhi. But due to frostbite his nose, lips, toes and fingers all had to be amputated. Zho-Zhi's laboratory was raided by Chinese government officials, and he revealed to Bright that he was actually a dissident and probably would be taken away for reeducation. Jess is recruited from prison by Major Zastrow of the Red Shadows. The Russians gave him cybernetic hands, and cybernetic feet that allowed him to walk again. Zastrow changes Bright's codename to Koschei the Deathless and put him to work on maintaining and improving the Rocket Reds. The Russians then sent him to Qurac where he was put in charge of the program to develop Qurac's metahuman program. Jaculi, Manticore and the Djinn were all his creations, but he was killed when Rick Flag destroyed Jotunheim with an atomic bomb. The Quracis were able to revive him as a cybernetic zombie using technology he himself had created; his body was dead and his mind was now a digital recording. As part of an elaborate revenge against Rick Flag, Koschei kidnaps his son by Karin Grace, Rick Flag Jr. Unbeknownst to Koschei, Flag had apparently died in the nuclear detonation that destroyed Jotunheim. Nemesis eventually convinced him to set the boy free, and he appeared to have been destroyed by an explosion that he set off.

Agni assembled yet another Onslaught team with the help of Njara Kattuah, Rustam's son. This new team's mission of vengeance against America was short-lived. After disposing of a team of Checkmate Knights who had tracked them as far as Markovia, they were discovered on an airplane bound for Gotham by the Outsiders, who were also on the flight, and a fight broke out onboard the plane. The battle in midair nearly cost some of the Outsiders their lives, but Manticore and Dahak both ended up dying instead, with Djinn presumably killed as well. The fight is ended after it forces the plane to make a hard landing in Gotham, with all the surviving Onslaught members except for Dervish escaping. Dervish later joined the Outsiders in order to find Manticore, who she thought was alive, remaining with them until she discovered what happened to Manticore. In anger she joined the second Strike Force Kobra. After a clash with the Outsiders, she was captured and imprisoned in the Slab, she later escaped when the Joker engineered a jailbreak.

Njara later returned with a new team including Antiphon, Tolteca, Hyve and Digital Djinn. They succeeded in kidnapping Amanda Waller as part of an elaborate revenge, and in killing Squad members Havana (killed by Rustam) and Modem (killed by Digital Djinn). They were no match for the Squad when members of the Justice Society of America were drafted to help. The second Rustam was killed by Deadshot and the other members escaped custody.

== Roster ==
=== Team one (Suicide Squad #1-2) ===
Onslaught team five, artist Paco Medina.

- Chimera - She was actually Suicide Squad member Nightshade.
- Djinn - His body was reduced to a binary code and stored in microchips within a magnetic bottle. Enchantress destroyed his bottle, presumably killing him.
- Jaculi - A young Bedouin with the ability to move at super-speed in three second spurts. He carried an assortment of explosive javelins. Jaculi was killed by Captain Boomerang.
- Manticore - A super-strong cyborg from Greece, he was killed by Deadshot. Manticore is named after the mythical namesake due to the armor resembling it. During the events of Blackest Night, Manticore's corpse is reanimated as a member of the Black Lantern Corps alongside several fallen Suicide Squad members.
- Colonel Mushtaq - He was actually Nemesis in an undercover role.
- Ravan - The last surviving thuggee, his back was broken in single combat with the Bronze Tiger.
- Rustam - Raza Kattuah was the first team leader, named after Rostam, a mythic hero in Persian folklore. Rustam wields a scimitar artifact from Skartaris which could generate fiery plasma that could seemingly cut through anything, and open dimensional portals. The scimitar uses its wielder's life force as a power source.

=== Team two (Suicide Squad #17-19) ===
- Agni - Agni is an Asian Indian pyrokinetic who could create progressively larger fireballs by snapping his fingers. He is named after Agni, the Hindu god of fire.
- Badb - A teenaged Irish telepath who could mentally instill panic and hatred. She is named after Badb, the Celtic goddess of war.
- Ifrit - She was a new artificial intelligence, similar to Djinn, based on the brain patterns of Mindboggler, whose mental engrams were salvaged by Quraci scientists, and twisted to induce extreme aggression and hate; she was healed of this by sentient Israeli computer Dybbuk and fell in love with him. She is named after the Persian spirits known as Ifrits.
- Jaculi - The second Jaculi was a woman of unknown nationality with the speed and weapons of the original. She was killed by Deadshot.
- Koshchei The Deathless - Jess Bright, former member of the original Suicide Squad. He could animate the dead using specialized electronic implants, controlling them via telepresence; this control was accidentally broken by Shade the Changing Man. In Russian folklore, Koshchei the Deathless is a powerful necromancer.
- Manticore - The second Manticore, also of unknown nationality, was tougher than his predecessor; he was killed by Duchess (Lashina).
- Ravan - A master assassin now wearing a cybernetic harness because of his broken back. After being captured by the Bronze Tiger, he joins the Suicide Squad.
- Rustam - Team leader and the same operative.

=== Team three (Suicide Squad #59-62) ===
- Agni - The team leader for this mission.
- Badb - The same operative.
- Piscator - An Atlantean renegade and self-styled Janissary.

=== Team four (Outsiders (vol. 2) #5-6) ===
- Agni - Second-in-command for this mission.
- Dahak - A demon who used the body of an old Quraci woman as its host.
- Dervish - Nema, a female martial artist, she is romantically tied to Manticore. Nema is named after the traditional dervishes. She later joined Strike Force Kobra.
- Djinn - The original Djinn restored by the group's technicians. He is presumably destroyed again after Sebastian Faust traps him in a hand-held TV that he throws into Agni's flames.
- Manticore - The third Manticore was Saied, who was romantically tied to Dervish. He was accidentally killed during a fight with Charlie Wylde of the Outsiders, but turned up alive as a member of the Injustice League Unlimited.
- Rustam - Njara Kattuah, team leader and the son of the original Rustam. Njara has demonstrated pyrokinetic abilities, but is unknown if they were internal, or if he had access to his father's scimitar.

=== Team five (Suicide Squad (vol. 2) #10-12) ===
- Antiphon - A super speedster from Greece. The name is based on the term Antiphon (opposing voice).
- Digital Djinn - A new more powerful creation based on the original Djinn.
- Hyve - A hulking creature able to separate into smaller copies of itself.
- Rustam - Njara Kattuah, team leader. He is killed by Deadshot.
- Tolteca - A powerful warrior woman and cannibal. Her name is derived from the Toltecs of Mexico.

== In other media ==
=== Television ===
Onslaught appears in Young Justice, consisting of Psimon, Devastation, Mammoth, Shimmer, Icicle Jr., the Terror Twins, and Holocaust. This version of the group serves Queen Bee and the Light. Additionally, Jaculi appears as an assassin and member of Baron Bedlam's metahuman trafficking ring who is sent to kill Markovia's king and queen before Jaculi is killed in turn by Bedlam.

=== Miscellaneous ===
- Onslaught appears in the non-canonical Arrow tie-in comic series Arrow: Season 2.5. This version of the group is led by Khem-Adam, who wished to bring Kahndaq back to its traditional roots.
- The Young Justice incarnation of Onslaught appears in the tie-in comic Young Justice: Targets, with the addition of Match.
