= Berry's World =

American comic strip by Jim Berry

Berry's World was the title of a syndicated daily editorial cartoon by Jim Berry which ran from February 18, 1963, through March 1, 2003, with a weekly color installment that appeared in the Sunday comic strip section. Berry received the National Cartoonist Society Newspaper Panel Cartoon Award for 1965, 1966, and 1972 for his work on the strip.
