= Ice Quake (film) =

2010 television film directed by Paul Ziller

- Written by: David Ray
- Directed by: Paul Ziller
- Starring: Brendan Fehr; Holly Dignard; Jodelle Ferland; Ryan Grantham; Rob LaBelle
- Music by: Michael Neilson
- Country of origin: Canada
- Original language: English

Production
- Producers: Josee Bernard; Tom Berry; Lisa M. Hansen; Paul Hertzberg; John Prince
- Cinematography: Anthony C. Metchie
- Editor: Christopher A. Smith
- Running time: 91 minutes
- Production company: Quake Productions

Original release
- Network: Syfy
- Release: December 11, 2010

Ice Quake, also called Ice Quake: Nature Unleashed, is a 2010 television action film written by David Ray and directed by Paul Ziller and shown on the Syfy channel. It stars Brendan Fehr, Holly Dignard, Jodelle Ferland, Ryan Grantham and Rob LaBelle. Set primarily in Alaska, the film follows the members of a family caught amidst a natural disaster. As the permafrost thaws, subterranean rivers of liquid methane and disastrous earthquakes are unleashed, threatening to lead the Earth to a catastrophic end.

== Plot ==
Under the Alaskan permafrost organic materials have been rotting for thousands of years. As it thaws, volatile liquid methane and gases are released causing a succession of destructive earthquakes.

A family is on the hunt for a Christmas tree when their dog runs away. There is a gas explosion under the ice and a fissure opens causing an avalanche. They run until another tremor causes the ground to split open, creating a deep ravine that splits them apart - the parents on one side and two children on the other. The father tells the children to go to the summit and wait for rescue. The children head up then find out there is a storm on the way. The younger brother suggests they keep moving until they can stop at a safe place

The military based around the mountain investigate the tremors, at first believing them to be earthquakes until they find that there have been no tectonic movements, and nothing shows on the Richter scale. They then think it could have been a volcanic eruption, but this also proves false. It is a race against time to stop the liquids and gases before they lead to a catastrophic explosion that threatens the planet.

== Production ==
Ice Quake is the Syfy Cable television company's own holiday TV movie production. The filming of the movie took place in three different locations.

- Maple Ridge, British Columbia, Canada
- Agassiz, British Columbia, Canada
- Hemlock Valley, British Columbia, Canada

In the production and post-production other companies helped with Syfy's work. Movie Central was one of the main companies that helped with this production of this film. Northwest Digital worked with the production teamto create a quality visual experience, along with The Exile Visual Effects Studio who provided the visual effects to create the perfect atmosphere for a holiday disaster. Pinewood Sounds was in charge of the movie's sound effects and recording.

== Cast ==
- Brendan Fehr as Michael Webster, is a geologist studying the effects of the Alaska landscape. He works for the military and is a specialist in his field. He is also married to Emily and the father of Tia and Shane.
- Holly Dignard as Emily Webster, is married to Michael and mother of Tia and Shane.
- Jodelle Ferland as Tia Webster, is the teenage daughter of Michael and Emily and the sister of Shane.
- Ryan Grantham as Shane Webster, is the young son of Michael and Emily, and the brother of Tia.
- Rob LaBelle as Bruce Worthington
- Nicholas Carrella as Ram
- Victor Garber as Colonel Bill Hughes, is Michael's military superior, and works with Michael and his family to prevent a methane explosion from wiping out Earth.
- Marsha Regis as Carolyn
- Sharon Taylor as Jamie
- Lane Edwards as Reed
- Kurt Max Runte as Wallace
- Aaron Pearl as Cochrane
- Dean Redman as Sergeant
- James Pizzinato as Boy
- MacKenzie Porter as Girl

== Music ==
The movie has two songs credited in the soundtrack. As a holiday TV movie both of the songs are traditional Christmas carols: "Joy to the World" and "Here We Come A-wassailing", as performed by the Occidental Glee Club.

== Release ==
Ice Quake was first shown on the Syfy channel on December 11, 2010 in the U.S. and was released on DVD on July 2, 2012. Since then it has been shown on television and released on DVD in numerous countries including the UK, Germany and Italy. It has also been released on Blu-ray.
