= Count Vertigo =

Fictional character

Publication information
- Publisher: DC Comics
- First appearance: World's Finest Comics #251 (July 1978)
- Created by: Gerry Conway (writer); Trevor Von Eeden (penciller); Vince Colletta (inker)

In-story information
- Full name: Count Werner Vertigo (1978–2011); Count Werner Zytle (2011–present)
- Species: Metahuman
- Team affiliations: Secret Society of Super Villains; Checkmate; Suicide Squad; Injustice Society; Longbow Hunters; Injustice League
- Notable aliases: White Queen's Knight
- Abilities: Flight; Skilled hand-to-hand combatant; Magnetic boots; Vertigo effect to alter the balance of others and induce dizziness or nausea

Count Vertigo (Werner Vertigo, later Werner Zytle) is a supervillain appearing in American comic books published by DC Comics. Created by writer Gerry Conway and artists Trevor Von Eeden and Vince Colletta, the character first appeared in World's Finest Comics #251 (1978). In the DC Universe, Count Vertigo is the last descendant of the royal family that ruled the small eastern European country of Vlatava, which was taken over by the Soviet Union and later devastated by the Spectre. The character serves as an enemy of the superheroes Black Canary, Batman and later Green Arrow.

Two incarnations of Count Vertigo, Cecil Adams and Werner Zytle, appear in Arrow, portrayed by Seth Gabel and Peter Stormare, respectively. Additionally, Michael York, Greg Ellis, and Steve Blum have voiced Vertigo in animation.

== Publication history ==
Count Vertigo was created by writer Gerry Conway and artists Trevor Von Eeden and Vince Colletta, and first appeared in World's Finest Comics #251 (1978). Vertigo's costume was designed by Von Eeden, with the patterning of his cape being a tribute to Steve Ditko's distinctively arcane artwork.

== Fictional character biography ==
Count Vertigo first appeared in Star City, where he attempted to steal back the jewels his parents had sold when they escaped to England. Due to having a hereditary inner ear defect that affected his balance, Vertigo had a small electronic device implanted in his right temple to compensate. Tinkering with the device, Vertigo learned he was able to affect other people's balance as well, distorting their perceptions and inducing vertigo. Donning a costume and taking the name "Count Vertigo", he embarked on a life of crime. This would bring him into conflict with the heroes Green Arrow and Black Canary.

Vertigo later joins the Suicide Squad in exchange for a shortened prison sentence, and it is revealed that he has bipolar disorder. After the Suicide Squad disbands, Vertigo is captured by rebels from Vlatava, who intend to use his powers to overthrow the Vlatavan government.

Vertigo is captured by Poison Ivy when the Suicide Squad came in and resolved the conflict and Kaligari (then-ruler of Vlatava) was murdered. Vertigo was Ivy's slave for a long period of time, during which he grew to hate Ivy and frequently threatened to kill her when he was free of her control. Amanda Waller frees Vertigo from Ivy's control, enabling him to stop a group of missiles from hitting Dome of the Rock in Jerusalem at the behest of the villain Kobra.

Vertigo attends rehab and expunges the chemicals that had been pumped into his body by both Ivy and the rebels, unwittingly curing him of the disorder that had plagued him for so long. Vertigo is unable to cope and approaches Deadshot, one of his teammates, hoping that he will be willing to kill him. The running subplot would ultimately culminate in the last pages of the first volume of Suicide Squad, in which Deadshot and Vertigo stood across one another, Deadshot ready to kill him. Vertigo realizes that this was ultimately an indirect suicide, and that would ruin his chances for the afterlife. Deciding for now that he would deal with the disease that now indirectly plagued him, he abandons the duel.

Vertigo later returns to Vlatava to ensure that he would once more become its rightful ruler. While his forces are at war with the government's army, the Spectre appears and is horrified by the slaughter. In a fit of rage, the Spectre deems Vlatava and its inhabitants to be full of sin and decides to cleanse it, sparing only Vertigo and Vlatava's president.

Working for the American government for a while, Count Vertigo eventually sought out his old enemy Green Arrow. Vertigo decided to leave his vendetta behind and focus on more positive prospects, getting his life back on track. He later appears as a member of the new Injustice Society. He also shows up as an operative of the Suicide Squad when they attempt to dissuade the Justice League from investigating the "Salvation Run" project.

Vertigo appears in the revamped Checkmate title as part of its regular cast as the White Queen's Knight under White Queen Amanda Waller. He is later seen capturing the Rogues responsible for the murder of Bart Allen, alongside a new Suicide Squad consisting of Bronze Tiger, Captain Boomerang (Owen Mercer), Plastique, Multiplex, and Deadshot.

=== The New 52 ===
In September 2011, The New 52 rebooted DC's continuity. In this new timeline, Count Vertigo made his debut in Green Arrow (vol. 5) #22. The character is renamed Werner Zytle and depicted as the ruler of Vlatava. Though of noble heritage, his family lost their fortune and had to flee to Canada. While in Canada, Zytle becomes involved with organized crime, using the profits from his activities to return to Vlatava and reclaim his birthright. Vertigo later appears as a member of Richard Dragon's Longbow Hunters.

== Powers and abilities ==
Count Vertigo is trained in classical martial combat and the sports of boxing, fencing, and equestrianism. He has also been trained in judo and karate.

His "Vertigo Effect" has long since been internalized through circumstances that have not yet been revealed. He uses his power to disrupt his enemies' balance. In hand-to-hand and melee combat, Vertigo uses his power to disorient his opponents. He also uses the Vertigo Effect to disrupt the aim of gunmen, snipers and the like. The exact range of the power is unrevealed, seeing as how on one mission, guards watching him in action on camera were also affected by his power. This ability is also capable of disrupting guidance systems on missiles, vehicles, and detection systems. Vertigo also wears magnetic boots with which he can walk walls or ceilings. In later appearances, he gains the ability of flight.

== Other versions ==
An alternate universe version of Count Vertigo appears in the Flashpoint tie-in Deadman and the Flying Graysons. This version lost his family during the Amazon-Atlantean war. He attempts to retrieve Doctor Fate's helmet before being killed in battle and giving the helmet to Dick Grayson.

== In other media ==
=== Television ===
Vertigo as he appears in Batman: The Animated Series.

Count Vertigo as he appears in The Batman.

- Count Vertigo, referred to simply as Vertigo, appears in the Batman: The Animated Series episode "Off Balance", voiced by Michael York. This version is a German leading member of the Society of Shadows whose "Vertigo Effect" is derived from an eyepatch, which Batman theorizes to be radioactive. After being defeated by Batman and Talia al Ghul, Vertigo is presumed dead.
- Count Vertigo appears in The Batman episode "Vertigo", voiced by Greg Ellis. This version is a scientist and ex-employee of Oliver Queen who wields a mechanical eyepiece, which he used to strand Queen on a deserted island for years.
- Count Vertigo appears in Young Justice, voiced by Steve Blum. This version is a member of the Light and leader of the Injustice League.
- Two incarnations of Count Vertigo appear in Arrow, with both being involved in the distribution of the street drug "Vertigo" and displaying great skill in using it as an offensive weapon via syringes.
  - The first, Cecil Adams, appears in the first season episode "Vertigo" and second season episode "State v. Queen", portrayed by Seth Gabel. While he goes unnamed in these episodes, his name is revealed in the fifth season episode "Kapiushon". This version is an eccentric drug dealer who is initially dubbed "The Count" for leaving needle marks resembling vampire bites on his overdosed victims. He escapes prison in the second season, takes the name "Count Vertigo", and poisons Starling City's citizens, such as Thea Queen, with his namesake drug. Upon learning of this, Thea's brother Oliver Queen develops a bitter rivalry with Adams, eventually killing him to protect Felicity Smoak.
  - The second is Adams' successor Werner Zytle, portrayed by Peter Stormare. In the third season episodes "The Calm" and "Canaries", he becomes the new "Vertigo" and takes advantage of Queen capturing his mob rivals to rapidly build a criminal empire. Additionally, Zytle modified his namesake drug so that it causes the user to experience their deepest fears.

=== Film ===
- Count Vertigo was reportedly featured in David S. Goyer's script for Escape from Super Max as an inmate of the eponymous prison.
- Count Vertigo appears in DC Showcase: Green Arrow, voiced by Steve Blum.
- Count Vertigo appears in a flashback depicted in Suicide Squad: Hell to Pay, voiced by Jim Pirri. This version was the leader of a previous iteration of the Suicide Squad who allied with Jewelee in an attempt to betray Amanda Waller, only to be killed by the latter for it.

=== Video games ===
- Count Vertigo appears as a character summon in Scribblenauts Unmasked: A DC Comics Adventure.
- Count Vertigo appears as a playable character in Lego DC Super-Villains, voiced again by Steve Blum.

=== Miscellaneous ===
The Arrow incarnation of Werner Zytle appears in the non-canonical tie-in comic Arrow: Season 2.5.
