= Batman: Soul of the Dragon =

2021 film by Sam Liu

- Blu-ray release cover.
- Directed by: Sam Liu
- Written by: Jeremy Adams
- Based on: The Characters from DC Batman by Bob Kane and Bill Finger
- Produced by: Jim Krieg; Sam Liu; Kimberly S. Moreau
- Starring: David Giuntoli; Mark Dacascos; Kelly Hu; Michael Jai White
- Edited by: Bruce A. King
- Music by: Joachim Horsley
- Production companies: Warner Bros. Animation; DC Entertainment; Studio Mir (animation services)
- Distributed by: Warner Bros. Home Entertainment
- Release date: January 12, 2021
- Running time: 83 minutes
- Country: United States
- Language: English

Batman: Soul of the Dragon is a 2021 American animated superhero film produced by Warner Bros. Animation and DC Entertainment. It is the 43rd film of the DC Universe Animated Original Movies. The film is directed by Sam Liu and executive produced by Bruce Timm featuring an original story not based on any comic, set in the 1970s and inspired by martial arts films of that time. It features the voices of David Giuntoli as Bruce Wayne/Batman, Mark Dacascos as Richard Dragon, Kelly Hu as Lady Shiva, Michael Jai White as Ben Turner/Bronze Tiger and James Hong as O-Sensei. White reprised his role from The CW's TV show Arrow and Hu reprised her role from WB Games Montréal's video game Batman: Arkham Origins.

The film was dedicated to comic book writer Dennis O'Neil who died on June 11, 2020, at the age of 81.

== Plot ==
In Bruce Wayne's younger years, while training himself to become a vigilante crime-fighter, he travels to Nanda Parbat, a secret monastery in the Hindu Kush region, where he meets its caretaker, O-Sensei, and five other students training in the martial arts; Shiva, Richard Dragon, Jade, Ben Turner and Rip Jagger. O-Sensei eventually entrusts Shiva with Soul Breaker, a Muramasa sword in his possession, but otherwise remains secretive about a certain door at the monastery's outer perimeter. One night, Rip penetrates the forbidden door and kills Jade with Soul Breaker, which is the key to a mystical gate O-Sensei was guarding. This gate opens to the home dimension of the serpent god Nāga; four of his servants emerge and devour Rip before turning on O-Sensei and his students. Bruce and the others kill the demons, but to close the gate, O-Sensei sacrifices himself by entering Nāga's realm. The chamber then collapses, leaving only the gate intact.

Years later, Richard discovers that millionaire Jeffrey Burr, leader of the Kobra cult, has gained possession of the gate. Richard travels to Gotham City to ask Bruce for help, but they are attacked by a mercenary gang known as the Axe Gang, hired by Burr's chief killer Schlangenfaust. During this fight, Richard learns that Bruce is Batman and that Schlangenfaust is looking for Soul Breaker. They head for Gotham Chinatown to inform Shiva, now the resident crime lord, but the cultists attack them there and Schlangenfaust uses the distraction to steal the sword. Needing assistance, the three recruit Ben, now a martial arts teacher, and together they track the cult to a fortified island where they are preparing to open the gate by sacrificing several kidnapped children to Soul Breaker. They also learn from Ben that years ago he had tracked Kobra after discovering that Rip was one of their members and that he learned that due to an obscure prophecy, Burr means to become Nāga's earthly avatar.

Arriving by plane, Batman, Richard, Shiva and Ben parachute down and penetrate Kobra's defenses through a set of catacombs. However, they encounter Schlangenfaust, who is revealed as one of Nāga's demonic servants. While Batman and Ben battle Schlangenfaust, Richard and Shiva prevent the sacrifice of the children and engage the cult members. Vanquishing their opponents, they corner Burr at the gate, but Burr turns Soul Breaker against himself, opening the doorway. Nāga emerges, having possessed O-Sensei's body, and swiftly overwhelms the companions. Nāga reveals that Richard is his actual destined host and tries to seduce him with promises of power, but Richard refuses and, with some help from Batman, uses Soul Breaker to banish him by stabbing O-Sensei.

Freed from Nāga's control, O-Sensei bids his students farewell before dying in their arms. To permanently close the gate, Batman enters Nāga's dimension wielding Soul Breaker, with Richard, Shiva, and Ben willingly following him. Once the gate has closed, the four prepare for battle against Nāga and his demon horde.

== Cast ==
- David Giuntoli as Bruce Wayne / Batman
- Mark Dacascos as Richard Dragon
- Kelly Hu as Lady Shiva. Hu previously voiced the character in the video game Batman: Arkham Origins.
- Michael Jai White as Ben Turner / Bronze Tiger. White previously portrayed the character on The CW TV series Arrow.
- James Hong as O-Sensei
- Jamie Chung as Jade Nguyen
- Josh Keaton as Jeffrey Burr
- Chris Cox as Rip Jagger
- Robin Atkin Downes as Schlangenfaust
- Grey Griffin as Lady Eve, Prostitute (uncredited), Sacrificial Boy (uncredited)
- Patrick Seitz as Sir Edmund Dorrance / King Snake
- Eric Bauza as Axe Gang Leader
- Erica Luttrell as Silver St. Cloud

== Production ==
The film was announced on August 13, 2020, along with the film's voice cast. It features an original story set in the 1970s.

== Release ==
The film was released on digital platforms on January 12, 2021, and was also released on Blu-ray and DVD on January 26, 2021.

== Reception ==
The film was well received by critics. On the review aggregator website Rotten Tomatoes, 93% of 15 critics' reviews are positive, with an average rating of 6.6/10. DVD Talk rated the film three out of five stars as "Recommended".
