= Kill Switch (2008 film) =

2008 action film starring Steven Seagal

- Directed by: Jeff F. King
- Written by: Steven Seagal
- Produced by: Lindsay MacAdam; Kirk Shaw; Avi Lerner (executive); Steven Seagal (executive)
- Starring: Steven Seagal; Holly Dignard; Chris Thomas King; Michael Filipowich; Isaac Hayes
- Cinematography: Tom Harting
- Edited by: Jamie Alain
- Music by: John Sereda
- Production companies: Nu Image; Insight Film Studios; CineTel Films; Steamroller Productions; Peace Arch Entertainment
- Distributed by: First Look International (US); Nu Image (non-US); Millennium Films (non-US)
- Release date: October 7, 2008 (United States)
- Running time: 96 minutes
- Countries: Canada; United States
- Languages: English; Russian
- Budget: $10 million

Kill Switch is a 2008 action thriller film starring Steven Seagal and directed by Jeff F. King. Steven Seagal plays Detective Jacob King, a tough cop with a reputation for violent street-justice methods. King investigates murders in Memphis, Tennessee, perpetrated by a serial killer known as Lazerus. The film is also notable for featuring one of the last roles of Isaac Hayes.

== Plot ==
Jacob King is a police officer in Memphis, Tennessee, whose brutal methods have gained him a legendary reputation among his colleagues. Seemingly indifferent to the fact his twin brother was murdered in front of him as a child, King investigates a series of brutal killings, most involving young, attractive women. The murderer, Lazerus, leaves cryptic, astrological clues at the crime scenes. At the same time, another murderer, Billy Joe Hill (Mark Collie), is killing women. King finds him and kicks him out a window (which is shown repeatedly), after which Hill seeks revenge by murdering Celine (Karyn Michelle Baltzer), whom he believes to be King's girlfriend.

King goes on a brutal rampage through the Memphis underworld with the assistance of his partner, Detective Storm Anderson (Chris Thomas King) and the coroner (Isaac Hayes). King meets FBI agent Frankie Miller (Holly Dignard) but dislikes her because she does not approve of his methods. Lazerus attempts to frame King for the murder of a blonde barmaid, and Miller believes the frame and begins to pursue King. Meanwhile, King locates Lazerus and fights him, using a ball-peen hammer to break every bone in his body. He then goes after Billy Joe Hill and kills him after finding Celine dead.

King then chooses to exit the scene, leaving Anderson a note explaining he is quitting because no one likes his style of justice.

The final scene shows King returning to what appears to be his Russian wife and family.

== Cast ==
- Steven Seagal as Detective Jacob King
- Holly Dignard as FBI Agent Frankie Miller
- Karyn Michelle Baltzer as Celine
- Chris Thomas King as Detective Storm Anderson
- Philip Granger as Captain Jensen
- Jerry Rector as CDLU Lawyer
- Isaac Hayes as Coroner
- Michael Filipowich as Lazerus Jones
- Mark Collie as Billy Joe Hill

== Theatrical release ==
The film later received theatrical distribution exclusively in the UAE in 2009.
