= David Ray (director) =

David Gordon Ray (born February 24, 1968) is a Canadian screenplay writer and film director from Montreal, Quebec, Canada.

He is a lecturer in the film department of the University of British Columbia.

== Selected filmography ==
- 2005 - Fetching Cody - film
- 2006 - Need for Speed: Carbon - video game
- 2006 - A Safer Sex Trade - documentary
- 2010 - Earth's Final Hours - television film
- 2010 - Ice Quake - television film
- 2010 - Mandrake - television film
- 2011 - Seattle Superstorm - television film
- 2011 - Mega Cyclone - television film
- 2011 - Earth's Last Hours - television film
- 2011 - The Sex Lives of Pirates
- 2017 - Grand Unified Theory
