= Longbow Hunters =

DC Comics supervillain group

Publication information
- Publisher: DC Comics
- First appearance: Green Arrow Vol. 5 #31 (July 2014)
- Created by: Jeff Lemire

In-story information
- Member(s): Richard Dragon; Brick; Count Vertigo; Killer Moth; Red Dart

The Longbow Hunters is the name of a supervillain group appearing in American comic books published by DC Comics. They are depicted as enemies of Green Arrow. The Longbow Hunters first appeared in Green Arrow Vol. 5 #31 and were created by Jeff Lemire.

The Longbow Hunters appeared in the seventh season of Arrow as assassins hired by Ricardo Diaz. Holly Elissa portrayed Red Dart, Michael Jonsson portrayed Kodiak, and Miranda Edwards played Silencer.

== Fictional team history ==
The Longbow Hunters first appear ambushing John Diggle, assisted by Clock King. Richard Dragon has Brick, Count Vertigo, Killer Moth, and Red Dart surround Diggle and states that he is going to bring Green Arrow to them.

When Green Arrow returns to Seattle after his mission of chasing Komodo and Shado, he learns from Henry Fyff and Naomi Singh that Richard Dragon took over the city. Just then, Green Arrow detects that they were followed and protects them from an explosion caused by Red Dart. As Brick, Killer Moth, and Red Dart beat Green Arrow senseless, he witnesses his half-sister Emiko Queen attack the villains, dressed in a Green Arrow costume.

Emiko has joined the fight against the Longbow Hunters as Green Arrow's "apprentice", to the objection of Green Arrow. As Brick is nearly beaten to death by Green Arrow for harming Emiko, Killer Moth points a weapon at him, which Green Arrow counters with a tornado arrow. Red Dart returns to the battle to take Emiko hostage, only to be thumped in the back of her head by Naomi. Killer Moth then gives up Richard Dragon's location as Green Arrow insists that his friends look after Emiko.

As Clock King is taken down by Emiko, Killer Moth appears to finish the job. While Green Arrow and John Diggle fight Richard Dragon, Count Vertigo is instructed to deter the police. Naomi defeats Killer Moth with charged darts. Tearing a stray arrow from through the palm of his hand, Diggle tosses it to Oliver, who then uses its razor tip to slice through Dragon's femoral artery. After noticing the chaos caused by Vertigo, Green Arrow and Diggle focus on helping the civilians who were injured.

== Members ==
- Richard Dragon - Leader
- Brick
- Clock King - Associate
- Count Vertigo
- Killer Moth
- Red Dart

== In other media ==
The Longbow Hunters appear in the seventh season of Arrow, consisting of Red Dart (portrayed by Holly Elissa), Kodiak (portrayed by Michael Jonsson), and Silencer (portrayed by Miranda Edwards). This version of the group are assassins feared by the League of Assassins who were presumed dead since the 1950s. In the present, they are hired by Ricardo Diaz to serve in his criminal empire and later hired by Diaz's financier Dante to kill Emiko Queen's mother Kazumi Adachi.
