= Bronze Tiger =

- Bronze Tiger as he appeared in Deathstroke (2014-2016) #3. Art by Tony S. Daniel (penciler), Sandu Florea (inker), Tomeu Morey (colorist).

Publication information
- Publisher: DC Comics
- First appearance: Richard Dragon, Kung Fu Fighter #1 (May 1975)
- Created by: Dennis O'Neil (writer); Jim Berry (writer); Leopoldo Durañona (artist)

In-story information
- Alter ego: Benjamin "Ben" Turner
- Species: Human
- Place of origin: Central City; East St. Louis
- Team affiliations: C.B.I; G.O.O.D. The Syndicate; Suicide Squad; League of Assassins; Justice League Task Force
- Partnerships: Vixen; Richard Dragon; Lady Shiva; Cheshire; Rick Flag Jr.
- Supporting character of: Batman; Richard Dragon; Batgirl (Cassandra Cain)
- Abilities: Master martial artist, assassin, spy, and mercenary; master of most known forms with a defensive style for every known martial arts, expertise in various weaponry, and able to manipulate Qi.; Skilled strategist, tactician, and manipulator; With a magical talisman, he can transform into a humanoid tiger

Bronze Tiger is a fictional character appearing in American comic books published by DC Comics. Created by Dennis O'Neil, Jim Berry, and Leopoldo Durañona, he first appeared in Richard Dragon, Kung Fu Fighter #1 (May 1975) during the Bronze Age of Comics. The character is depicted as an African-American martial artist, considered among the most premier fighters in the world, rivaling his long-time friends and peers, Richard Dragon and Lady Shiva.

Originating from a middle-class background, Benjamin "Ben" Turner turned to martial arts in an effort to control his anger that first showcased itself during an armed robbery involving his parents. Later, he mastered various martial arts styles and studied under legendary martial artist O-Sensei alongside his aforementioned friends but his natural aptitude and skill garnered the attention of intelligence agencies and the League of Assassins, the latter whom eventually brainwashed him and christens him the Bronze Tiger. Turner is later enlisted as second-in-command of Amanda Waller's Suicide Squad, being one of the few trusted agents as Waller assists Turner in addressing the long-term effects of the League's brainwashing. After leaving the Squad, the character has served in a variety of roles, including being a superhero, a martial arts mentor, a world-class spy, and a vigilante.

The character has made appearances in various forms of media, including animated features like Suicide Squad: Hell to Pay and Batman: The Brave and the Bold. Notably, Bronze Tiger became a recurring character in the television series Arrow, portrayed by Michael Jai White, who also provided the character's voice in other animated adaptations.

== Publication history ==
Bronze Tiger first appeared in Dragon's Fists, a novel by Dennis O'Neil and Jim Berry which starred Richard Dragon. Bronze Tiger's first DC Comics appearance was in Richard Dragon, Kung Fu Fighter #1 (April/May 1975).

== Characterization ==
Since the character's publication history, Turner is regarded as one of the greatest martial artist on par with Lady Shiva and Richard Dragon, and portrayed as surpassing Batman in combat. At the times, the character is brainwashed and operates within mercenary circles and acts as a assassin and a world-class spy. As a superhero, the character has operated as a vigilante, befriended both superheroes and villains alike, and a martial arts instructor for heroes who owned a dojo. During his time in the Suicide Squad, he has acted as both field second-in-command and team leader, being an operative not coerced and favored by Amanda Waller.

=== Fictional character biography ===
Existing since the Bronze Age of Comics, the characters' history has been subjected to some revisions overtime.

In his history prior to Crisis on Infinite Earths, a young Ben Turner trained under the instruction of O-Sensei in Japan. The pair meet a young orphan and thief of American origin, Richard Drakunovski. While having ill-intentions and racist thoughts about Ben, the pair sensed good within him and O-Sensei takes him as a student and overtime, Ben bonds with Richard (later re-christened Richard Dragon) and formulate a close friendship. As adults, the pair are recruited by spymaster Barney Ling of G.O.O.D, an intelligence agency O-Sensei once worked in, becoming special agents and adventurers who use their martial skills for good. After leaving their master's side, they meet his goddaughter Carolyn Woosan, who is kidnapped by the assassin known as Swiss. While shot, Ben survives the ordeal but Carolyn is killed with Dragon implicated, leading to Lady Shiva (Carolyn's sister, Sandra) seeking revenge but when the truth reveals Dragon's innocence, she joins the trio. After being targeted by the League of Assassins upon inheriting land from his deceased sister, he is eventually captured by Professor Ojo and the league, who brainwashed him into the warrior known as Bronze Tiger.

Under the employ of Sensei, the League of Assassins' elite masters, he becomes involved in the death of Kathy Kane and showcased himself in downing Batman with, impressing Sensei despite the brainwashing making him unable to kill upon Sensei's orders. In a rematch with Batman where he performs better, Batman is struck by a poison dart by an ambitious lackey and betrays Sensei for a perceived lack of honor. Injured and outnumbered, Bronze Tiger manages to escape and leaves behind his tiger mask and cowl. While severing his ties with the League, he is betrayed again by Ling, who used his brainwashing to make him a loyal operative and pits him against Dragon to ensure Tiger's loyalty. When his identity is revealed to Dragon in the fight, Ling is revealed to be responsible for ousting Turner to the League and other hired killers and is accidentally pushed out of the window to his death. Dragon then vows to help him overcome his amnesia and brainwashing and begins making progress after seeing various physicians.

==== Post-Crisis on Infinite Earths ====
Bronze Tiger's background and past history has been subjected to differing depictions following Crisis on Infinite Earths; some events would correlate with prior histories and details.

Earlier accounts stated Ben came from an upper-middle-class black neighborhood in Central City. When he was ten years old, he watched a burglar attack his parents and killed the man with a kitchen knife, revealing a powerful anger and hate. To control his inner rage, he turned to martial arts and was a natural prodigy at it but seeking outlets led to encounters with law enforcement and he left America to train under numerous masters, including Kirigi (a Korean martial artist who also trained Batman) who uses him as a tool. Eventually, he trains under O-Sensei, who helps him control his emotions, and meets Richard Dragon, who becomes his life-long friend. The pair eventually left their master's to become field agents under King Faraday's C.B.I. He would later settle down with wife Myoshi, who is killed by the League of Assassins in retaliation for foiling them in the past. Seeking revenge, he is instead captured and brainwashed under the orders of Senei before he constructed a mask to channel his anger into. The brainwashing ensured he obeyed Sensei while wearing the mask. A second account instead casts him as older than Richard Dragon; similarly a master martial artist, he serves as Detroit native Richard Drakunvonski's martial arts master and is both a parental and brother-like figure in his life and is responsible for giving him the "Dragon" moniker.

Cover to Suicide Squad #65, illustrated by Geof Isherwood, Robert Campanella and Tom McCraw.

During his tenure in the League of Assassins following his brainwashing, he trains Cassandra Cain and develops a fearsome reputation, with his identity a secret for a time and Sensei ensured he did not take off his mask frequently to keep him docile and loyal. As Bronze Tiger, he became one of the most wanted criminals in the world wanted. Faraday eventually deduces him to his former agent and sets et up a rescue squad of Rick Flag and Nightshade. They retrieved the Tiger, and he was deprogrammed by Amanda Waller, director of Task Force X (known famously as the Suicide Squad). While originally positioning him as the teams' leader, interference from government officials due to racial bias instead makes him second-in-command under Rick Flag Jr. During his tenure, he bonds with teammate Vixen and becomes romantically involved with her and is one of the few members not coerced by Waller nor particularly a supervillain, being one of Waller's few trusted confidantes who enforces her rules. His missions also develops rivalries in Indian martial artist Ravan, modern Japanese samurai Neiko, and was once team leader following Flag's departure and seeming death. Turner is eventually confronted by his superiors about his actions, and in the ensuing meeting, Turner mind snaps and believes himself unfit for redemption for his past. Leaving and spending some time as a janissary, he is among Waller's reformed roster of the Suicide Squad even as Vixen leaves him and is taunted repeated by Ravan. In the team's last mission, the Squad struggles to free a small island nation from the tyranny of its seemingly immortal ruler. Subjected to hallucinations, he defeats himself, which "exorcsises his demons", and makes him whole before the tyrant is defeated by Waller herself.

Shortly after leaving the Squad, Turner is part of Bruce Wayne's search for Jack Drake and Shondra Kinsolving, who had been kidnapped. He teams up with Green Arrow and Gypsy, a member of Justice League Task Force. Gypsy becomes romantically involved with Tiger as he mentors in martial arts. Additionally, at a undefined point in time, he would train numerous students and spent time in underground fighting rings, where he met and had an altercation with Lady Shiva. Including many of those he trained was Dick Grayson (now currently Nightwing). Tiger later aids Dragon in getting a rematch with Shiva as they re-locate to Detroit and attract the attention of the Circle of Six, students of Lady Shiva. Dragon is coerced into stopping them by FBI agent, Barney Ling (a younger, revamped version of the pre-Crisis character), when Ben is ambushed and hospitalized but evidence frames Dragon due to Ling's inteference. When Cassanrdra Cain seeks information on her birth mother, who she (correctly) deduces is Lady Shiva, she tracked down Turner, who has opened his own dojo ("Tiger Dojo"). Both reconcile their histories with one another and he expresses his pride in Cassandra choosing to become a hero. He also aids Batman shortly afterwards to stop a group of villains and avenge his master. While tying to retire once more, he is coaxed back into action by Waller during World War III. Later, he rescues Rick Flag from a secret Quraci prison with a new costume and mask (to prove it no longer held power over him) and Waller later reveled herself as the leaker and enlists their aid in a "rogue" Suicide Squad team, which was run by Flag and Turner at Waller's behest. In one instance of arrest Gotham supervillains, he is gassed by an escaping Scarecrow, revealing a fear of insects. In another time frame, he works with Count Vertigo and Rick Flag to bring down a Mexican drug lord. When the Secret Six attempt to break into Belle Reve, Bronze Tiger squares off with Catman to see who is the superior feline-themed martial artist and prevails.

==== New 52 onwards ====
From the New 52 onwards, the character has a differing background and history; like before, alongside some new information, some accounts also references prior histories from both prior continuities.

Similarly to before, his new background has Turner trained by O-Sensei and befriended his life-time best friend, Richard Dragon. While staying in Detroit, the pair would meet martial artists Carolyn and Sandra Wusan. The quartet trained alongside one another and traveled all over the world, using their martial arts skills for good until Carolyn's untimely death by David Cain; a love interest of Ben, Tiger would seek revenge similarly to Sandra (eventually Lady Shiva) but instead found himself brainwashed into the League of Assassins. Having established himself as one of the world's leading martial artist and mercenaries, he gains great power in the League of Assassins, trained Cassandra Cain under Cain's instruction, and is one of Jason Todd's former teachers. At some point in time, he also fathered Tenji Turner with Lady Shiva, raising him in secret in Richard Dragon's ranch in Montana and only allowed Shiva to see him once every year on his birthday.

During Ra's al Ghul's absence, Tiger is among a council that leads in his stead and follows Talia al Ghul's instruction in selecting Red Hood as the successor in leading the League of Assassins as part of a plan in stopping the Untitled, a sect of mystical warrior seeking the Well of Sins in the League's sacred city. When they are defeated, Ra's al Ghul appears and absorbs their mystical power. Tiger secretly aids the Outlaws, allowing Cheshire to free them. When Ra's is depowered by Red Hood, he advises retreat, a decision he follows. Tiger and Shiva fall under the mental thrall of Odysseus, Deathstroke's father who usurped command of the League of Assassins and sought to gain the powers of his grandson Jericho. Upon Odysseus's defeat, both are freed from his control.

Sometime after severing ties with the League of Assassins, Tiger later serves as a member of the Syndicate, a group of spymasters that keep peace between intelligence agencies. They are enlisted by Spyral's leader, Matron, to hunt rogue field operatives Agent 37 and Agent 1 when the former is framed for the murder of Nemesis in a suspected attempt of incurring a war between the intelligence community. The Syndicate would alternative target Matron when Tao's predictive abilities led him to deduce the potential return of Otto Netz, the original Agent Zero and infamous Nazi spymaster, through Matron. Concurrently, Maxwell Lord and Checkmate are also revealed to be involved, hoping to both dismantle Spyral and obtain the Minos files, which contained the identities of all Justice League members. Midnighter arrives to defeat the Syndicate and Netz himself is foiled in the end.

=== Skills and abilities ===
Having an aptitude for martial arts from a young age, Bronze Tiger studied under numerous masters, mastering most forms of martial arts and hand-to-hand combat, including: Karate, Aikido, Kung-Fu, Ninjutsu, Jujutsu, Jeet Kune Do, Silat, Hapkido, Muay Thai, and Taekwondo, the last in which he specializes in. His understanding of martial arts also has allowed him defensive techniques for every style and is a capable with a range of weaponry. He's also a field leader whom uses available resources to his advantage and is a spy and mercenary with influence in circles regarding the latter. Having attained spiritual enlightenment from his training with O-Sensei, this made him resistant to the complete effects of brainwashing. Bronze Tiger is also capable of using and channeling qi, allowing him to accelerate his own healing process.

After the New 52, he gains the power shift an even more deadlier form as a humanoid tiger through a magic talisman although the cost of doing so burns a piece of his soul each time. Additionally, he wears tiger-themed armor, once used the Venom drug to increase his strength to superhuman levels, and favors clawed weaponry such as a tekkō-kagi.

=== Racial identity and themes ===
The character's identity as African American is influenced in his characterization; during Richard Dragon, Kung-Fu Fighter, his contrasting background is noted when compared to Dragon, whom harbored racist tendencies in their first meeting but grew to overcome it later and becoming one of his best friends. Several other adversaries throughout the series often taunted him with racist remarks. In John Ostrander's Suicide Squad, racial bias was implied to be responsible for Turner's role as second-in-command to Rick Flag Jr. despite his leadership abilities and the odd level of scrutiny regarding his past by Sarge Steel and his superiors, the idea suspected by both by Amanda Waller and King Faraday respectively, and influenced the former's willingness to help him rehabilitate.

=== Love interests ===
Throughout his publication, Bronze Tiger has had several love interests; in his original appearances, Jane Lewis was his fiancée whom was killed by an assassin hired by her father to stage an attack, with him being an affiliate of the League of Assassins. Following Crisis on Infinite Earths, his background included Miyoshi, whom was killed by the League of Assassins in retaliation, and Cynthia Reynolds. In "DC All In", his revised backstory included Carolyn Wu-San as an interest until her death. Bronze Tiger's most significant love interest is Vixen, whom he dated during their time in the Suicide Squad until Sarge Steel's manipulations makes him doubt rehabilitation despite her support. Subsequent stories also depict their interactions after amicably. Recent stories and revisions has defined his relationship with Lady Shiva as "complicated" and culminated to the pair having a son.

== Other versions ==
- B'Nchalla / Bronze Panther, a composite character based on Bronze Tiger and Marvel Comics character Black Panther, appears in the Amalgam Comics imprint.
- Jade Tiger, a similarly named martial artist, is Ben's son with Lady Shiva whom he trained alongside Richard Dragon and the former.

== Reception and critical impact ==
Since the character's debut in comic books, Bronze Tiger is considered among stand-out martial arts characters and assassins in DC Comics. Originally a supporting character in Richard Dragon, Kung-Fu Fighter, particularly influenced heavily from "Blaxploitation" film genre, subsequent appearances in the John Ostrander's Suicide Squad run allowed the character to garner more recognition than Dragon and became a recognizable black superhero. During the timeframe where interracial relations was considered a cultural taboo, the character being paired with Gypsy was among notable instances in comics. Within media adaptations, one critic reviewing Suicide Squad: Hell to Pay noted Turner's character, praised for his moral development and role within the animated film.

== In other media ==
=== Television ===
Michael Jai White as Bronze Tiger in the CW's Arrow

- Bronze Tiger appears in Batman: The Brave and the Bold, voiced by Gary Anthony Sturgis. This version was a student of Wong Fei and protector of a small village who displays pride as a martial artist. In his most notable appearance in the episode "Return of the Fearsome Fangs!", he forms a reluctant partnership with Batman to battle the Terrible Trio after the three kill their Sensei. Following the fight, Bronze Tiger reopens Wong Fei's school.
- Ben Turner / Bronze Tiger appears in Arrow, portrayed by Michael Jai White. This version has a son named Connor Hawke. He later joins the Suicide Squad, reforms, and becomes an ally of Green Arrow.

=== Films ===
- An alternate universe incarnation of Bronze Tiger, with elements of the Cheetah, appears in Justice League: Gods and Monsters, voiced by Arif S. Kinchen.
- Bronze Tiger appears in Suicide Squad: Hell to Pay, voiced by Billy Brown. This version was a former CIA agent who became a vigilante after his fiancée was murdered by a former member of the League of Assassins and vowed never to take an innocent life. After being recruited by Amanda Waller's Task Force X program and tasked with retrieving a mystical "Get Out of Hell Free" card, Turner develops animosity towards the group's leader and assassin Deadshot. When the latter abandons the team to see his daughter, Waller appoints Turner as the squad's new leader. However, he is severely injured by an explosive trap set up by Professor Zoom. The squad drops off Turner at the hospital before Deadshot reassumes leadership and leads them in continuing the mission without him. Despite his injuries, Turner returns during the squad's final confrontation with Zoom, sacrificing himself to distract the speedster long enough for Deadshot to kill him. Before dying, Turner makes peace with Deadshot, who gives him the "Get Out of Hell Free" card in return.
- Bronze Tiger appears in Batman: Soul of the Dragon, voiced by Michael Jai White. This version is a student of O-Sensei.

=== Video games ===
- Bronze Tiger appears as a boss in Batman: Arkham Origins Blackgate, voiced again by Gary Anthony Sturgis. This version is the champion of prison fights held in the titular prison. In a post-credits scene, Amanda Waller and Rick Flag recruit Bronze Tiger and Deadshot into the Suicide Squad.
- Bronze Tiger appears as a character summon in Scribblenauts Unmasked: A DC Comics Adventure.
- Bronze Tiger appears as a playable character in Lego Batman 3: Beyond Gotham, voiced by Ike Amadi.
- Bronze Tiger appears as a playable character in Lego DC Super-Villains, voiced by Kane Jungbluth-Murry. This version is a member of the Legion of Doom.
- Ben Turner appears in Batman: Arkham Shadow, voiced by Zeno Robinson.
- Bronze Tiger appears in Lego Batman: Legacy of the Dark Knight via “Mayhem Mode”. This version is a humanoid tiger.

=== Merchandise ===
- Bronze Tiger received a figure in wave 18 of the DC Universe Classics line.

=== Miscellaneous ===
- Bronze Tiger appears in The Batman Adventures as a member of Black Mask's gang.
- Bronze Tiger makes a cameo appearance in a flashback in Batman: Arkham Unhinged.
- The Arrowverse incarnation of Bronze Tiger appears in the non-canonical digital comic Arrow: Season 2.5. He and the Suicide Squad are tasked with eliminating the extremist sect, Onslaught. While fighting the group in Kahndaq, the squad captures one of the extremists and tortures them for information on Onslaught's leader, Khem-Adam. Once they get the information, the squad storm Khem-Adam's stronghold, though Bronze Tiger is killed by the Onslaught leader. Deadshot carries Bronze Tiger's body away to bury him in his home country.
- Bronze Tiger makes a minor appearance in the Injustice: Gods Among Us prequel comic.
- Bronze Tiger appears in Deathstroke: Knights & Dragons, voiced by Delbert Hunt. This version is an amoral mercenary who works for H.I.V.E. under the command of fellow mercenary Jackal.
