= Holly Elissa Dignard =

Canadian actress (born 1979)

Holly Elissa
- Born: Holly Elissa Dignard; 1 October 1979 (age 46); Moncton, New Brunswick, Canada
- Other names: Holly Elissa Lamaro
- Occupation: Actor • Artist • Activist • Filmmaker
- Years active: 2000–present
- Height: 5 ft 6 in (168 cm)

Holly Elissa (born 1 October 1979, as Holly Elissa Dignard), is a Canadian artist, actress, filmmaker, and activist.

== Personal life ==
Elissa is an advocate for women's rights, child welfare, social injustice and discrimination as well as a supporter of animal and environmental welfare.

== Career ==
She made her TV debut on Syfy's hit series Outer Limits in 2000. Her other credits include The Chris Isaak Show, Stargate SG-1, Voyage of the Unicorn, Stargate Atlantis, The L Word, Battlestar Galactica, Kyle X/Y, Eureka, Supernatural, Kill Switch, Ice Quake, Polar Storm, and Arrow. She was one of the stars of the Canadian series Whistler.

== Filmography ==
=== Film ===
| Year | Title | Role | Notes |
|---|---|---|---|
| 2001 | Seeking Winonas | Waitress | |
| 2003 | Spook | Bar Girl | |
| 2006 | Alien Incursion | Honey | |
| 2008 | Kill Switch | FBI Agent Frankie Miller | |
| 2009 | Polar Storm | Cynthia Mayfield | |
| 2011 | Textuality | Kara | |
| 2016 | Bus Driver | Dylan | |

=== Television ===
| Year | Title | Role | Notes |
|---|---|---|---|
| 2000 | Call of the Wild | Ariella Rossmore | Episode: "Betrayal" |
| 2000 | The Outer Limits | Cindy | Episode: "Revival" |
| 2001 | Voyage of the Unicorn | Berty | 2 episodes |
| 2001 | The Chris Isaak Show | Saleswoman #1 | Episode: "T&A" |
| 2004 | Stargate SG-1 | President's Aide | 2 episodes |
| 2004 | Stargate Atlantis | Old Weir | Episode: "Before I Sleep" |
| 2006 | Kyle XY | Female Camper | Episode: "Pilot" |
| 2006 | Battlestar Galactica | Asha Janik | Episode: "Epiphanies" |
| 2006 | The L Word | Chandra | Episode: "Lead, Follow, or Get Out of the Way" |
| 2006–2007 | Whistler | Nicole Miller | 26 episodes |
| 2008 | Flash Gordon | Brini | Episode: "Cold Day in Hell" |
| 2008 | Eureka | Dr. Tracy Fox | Episode: "Best in Faux" |
| 2008, 2016 | Supernatural | Mary Henderson / Lucy | 2 episodes |
| 2009 | Polar Storm | Cynthia Mayfield | Television film |
| 2009 | Psych | Nyna Phillips | Episode: "He Dead" |
| 2009 | Something Evil Comes | Serena | Television film |
| 2010 | Fringe | Danielle Rose | Episode: "Amber 31422" |
| 2010 | Ice Quake | Emily Webster | Television film |
| 2010, 2011 | Hellcats | Kelsey Curtis | 2 episodes |
| 2011 | He Loves Me | Brunette | Television film |
| 2011 | Collision Earth | Michelle | Television film |
| 2012 | The 12 Disasters of Christmas | Mary | Television film |
| 2016 | Signed, Sealed, Delivered: From the Heart | Maddie | Television film |
| 2017 | The Christmas Train | Lelia | Television film |
| 2018 | Colony | Iris | Episode: "The Emerald City" |
| 2018 | Arrow | Red Dart | 3 episodes |
| 2019 | Van Helsing | Jennifer | 3 episodes |
| 2019 | Virgin River | Pauline | Episode: "Everybody Has a Secret" |
| 2020 | Love in Store | Linda | Television film |
| 2021 | Das Kindermädchen | Greta Hunter | Episode: "Mission Kanada" |
