= Brick (character) =

- Brick as depicted in Green Arrow vol. 3 #60 (May 2006). Art by Scott McDaniel (penciller), Andy Owens (inker), Guy Major (colorist), and Pat Brosseau (letterer).

Publication information
- Publisher: DC Comics
- First appearance: Green Arrow (vol. 3) #40 (September 2004)
- Created by: Judd Winick (writer); Phil Hester (artist)

In-story information
- Alter ego: Daniel "Danny" Brickwell
- Species: Metahuman
- Team affiliations: Secret Society of Super Villains; Longbow Hunters
- Abilities: Keen intellect; Superhuman strength and durability

Brick (Daniel "Danny" Brickwell) is a DC Comics supervillain and enemy of Green Arrow. Although his origin has not been revealed, Brick is a metahuman with a reddish, stony skin that granted him immense strength and durability. His success as an underworld kingpin was due to his brilliant criminal mind rather than these superhuman powers.

Daniel Brickwell appeared as a recurring character on The CW Arrowverse series Arrow, played by Vinnie Jones.

== Publication history ==
Brick first appeared in Green Arrow vol. 3 #40 (September 2004), and was created by writer Judd Winick and artist Phil Hester.

== Fictional character biography ==
Daniel Brickwell is originally a low-level criminal operating in Star City. After demons attack Star City, killing many people and leaving a power vacuum, Brickwell begins to expand his gang's criminal activities into areas left vacant by other criminal organizations. He unites several other gangs under his leadership, forming a large syndicate.

Brick hires Deathstroke to destroy Green Arrow's house as a member of Alexander Luthor Jr.'s Secret Society of Super Villains.

In One Year Later, after Doctor Light and Merlyn destroy most of Star City, Brick starts fighting crime in the ruins of the city. It is later revealed that he is only fighting crimes that he does not approve of, particularly the drug killing his customers.

Brick is apparently killed by Cupid, with his corpse being left as a "gift" for Green Arrow. He survives, relocates to San Francisco, and attempts to kidnap a young girl to extort money from her parents. However, Brick is ambushed and knocked out by Miss Martian.

In The New 52 reboot of DC's continuity, Brick is reintroduced as one of Richard Dragon's Longbow Hunters, who aim to kill Green Arrow because of the $30 million bounty Dragon put out on him.

Brick re-appears in Green Arrow comics following DC Rebirth. He is a mercenary and member of the "Ninth Circle", an international criminal organization and bank alongside Eddie Fyers, Shado, and Cheshire.

== Powers and abilities ==
Brick's primary power is his invulnerability. He can easily withstand a surface-to-air missile strike and numerous attacks from Green Arrow's arrows. Brick possesses an unproven level of super strength: he clearly outmatched Green Arrow fist to fist, but did not or could not win with a single hit. He is also a highly effective criminal leader, able to gain control of Star City's entire underworld, as well as having great influence over the legal authorities.

== In other media ==
- Brick appears in Young Justice, voiced by Khary Payton. This version is an inmate of Belle Reve who later joins Task Force X.
- Brick appears in the "Green Arrow" segment of DC Nation Shorts, voiced by Kevin Michael Richardson.
- Danny "Brick" Brickwell appears in Arrow, portrayed by Vinnie Jones. This version is a non-metahuman English gang leader whose nickname is derived from his high pain tolerance. Additionally, he killed Malcolm Merlyn's wife, Rebecca, as part of an initiation into a criminal gang. Throughout the third season, Brickwell and his gang take over Starling City district, the Glades, but are overthrown by Arsenal and Black Canary while Brickwell is defeated and nearly killed by Merlyn. In the fourth season, Brickwell escapes from Iron Heights Penitentiary and joins H.I.V.E., only to be defeated and remanded to Slabside Maximum Security Prison as of the seventh season. While working with Ricardo Diaz after he takes over the prison, Brickwell is killed by Stanley Dover.
- Brick makes a non-speaking appearance in Justice League Dark: Apokolips War.
- Brick appears as a character summon in Scribblenauts Unmasked: A DC Comics Adventure.
