= Kobra (DC Comics) =

Two supervillains published by DC Comics

- Kobra symbols

Publication information
- Publisher: DC Comics
- First appearance: Kobra #1 (February 1976)
- Created by: Jack Kirby; Steve Sherman

In-story information
- Alter ego: Jeffrey Franklin Burr; Jason Burr
- Species: Homo magi (current); Human (originally)
- Team affiliations: Kobra organization Strike Force Kobra; Blackadders; Underground Society
- Notable aliases: Lord Naga
- Abilities: Skilled hand-to-hand combatant Genius-level intelligence Excellent planner and tactician Longevity through the use of Lazarus Pits

Kobra is the name used by two supervillains published by DC Comics. The Jeffrey Burr incarnation of Kobra and his brother Jason first appeared in Kobra #1 (February 1976), and were created by Jack Kirby. Jason Burr debuted as Kobra in Faces of Evil: Kobra #1 (March 2009) by Ivan Brandon and Julian Lopez. The Kobra identity is later established as an international terrorist organization that frequently clashes with superheroes associated with the Justice League.

== Publication history ==
Both Jeffrey and Jason Burr were created by Jack Kirby for a proposed DC Comics series called King Kobra, the first issue of which was both written and drawn by Kirby. This first issue then sat in DC inventory for over a year, during which time Kirby left the publisher to return to Marvel Comics.

Co-creator Steve Sherman commented on the character's creation. He stated that Kobra was originally created for a one-shot comic and was inspired by Dr. Phibes, a character who used different means of killing his opponents. Sherman created Kobra's name and aesthetic by combining Phibes with thuggees - Indian robber gangs. Sherman met with Jack Kirby, who created the idea of the Burr siblings. He was inspired by The Corsican Brothers, a novella about conjoined twins who were separated at birth, but continue to share pain. By the time the meeting was over, Sherman and Kirby had written outlines for several stories beyond the initial one-shot.

The concept was handed over to writer Martin Pasko with orders to make a series out of it. Pasko was unimpressed with King Kobra, feeling it to be a throwaway idea churned out by Kirby as he was preparing to leave DC, and tried to make the best out of the assignment by whiting out all of Kirby's original dialogue, rescripting the issue, and having Pablo Marcos redraw some of the art. Now titled simply Kobra, the first issue of the series appeared in late 1975 (cover-dated February 1976). It was cancelled after seven issues, though the contents of the unpublished Kobra #8 saw print in DC Special Series #1. Pasko later reflected: "I wrote all of Kobra with my tongue firmly planted in my cheek—it was a preposterous exercise dumped in my lap, and it helped pay the rent on a very nice place in the Village".

Kobra is also featured in a January 2009 Faces of Evil one-shot, written by Ivan Brandon.

== Fictional character biography ==
=== Jeffrey Franklin Burr ===
Jeffrey Burr as Kobra as he appeared on the cover of Kobra #5 (December 1976), art by Rich Buckler and Frank McLaughlin.

Kobra is an international terrorist and mad scientist who has crossed paths with the majority of Earth's costumed heroes during his attempts to usher in the Kali Yuga, an age of chaos. His real name is Jeffrey Burr, and he was born part of a set of conjoined twins, but was stolen at birth by the Cult of the Kobra God, since a prophecy claimed he would lead them to rule the world. Under their teaching, he became a dangerous warrior and a sadistic criminal mastermind. He led the cult into using advanced technology to menace the world. Followers of Kobra frequently address their master as "Naja-Naja", the binomial name of the Indian cobra; this later became "Naga-Naga".

Unbeknownst to the cult, Jeffrey possesses a psychic link to his twin brother Jason, causing the two to share pain. At first, Kobra is unable to kill or even hurt his brother; eventually, however, he uses a device that "shut off" their psychic link, allowing him to kill Jason. Kobra is subsequently haunted by visions of his brother. Whether it really was his ghost or just Kobra's imagination was never revealed.

In subsequent years, Kobra would clash with assorted superheroes, including Batman, whom he first met over a Lazarus Pit of his own creation. Kobra had learned to build modified Lazarus Pits, which allowed him to control the minds of those he killed and resurrected. Kobra is the only person in the DC universe ever to decipher the formula for the Lazarus Pits. Kobra had special concerns about Wonder Woman and sought to ensure her death, first by hiring a cartel of international assassins who were led secretly by corrupted UN Crisis Bureau chief Morgan Tracy (also Diana Prince's boss), then by kidnapping and irretrievably damaging environmental activist Deborah Demaine, forcibly transforming her into a new Cheetah, and ultimately, facing Wonder Woman in combat in Egypt, faking his own demise after being defeated by the Amazon Princess. A short while later his various Strike Force Kobra teams would fight two different incarnations of Batman's Outsiders. Kobra also fought the third Flash, the Suicide Squad led by Amanda Waller, the original incarnation of Checkmate, Captain Atom, a Superman whose personality had been swapped with Ambush Bug's by exposure to red Kryptonite, and others.

After the betrayal of his lover Lady Eve during the Strike Force Kobra fiasco, she split Kobra in two and established her own splinter group. In the Power Company: Sapphire #1 the Justice League rushes to San Diego to prevent disaster as two rival factions of Kobra prepared to go to war. One faction was led by Eve; the other was led by Kobra himself.

He kidnaps the former hero Air Wave and uses him to seize control of the world's media and satellite resources, intending to destroy a number of major world cities. However, in a demonstration of his power, he incidentally kills Terri Rothstein, Atom Smasher's mother, ensuring the Justice Society of America's involvement. Atom Smasher later saves Terri via time travel, replacing her with the villain Extant and allowing him to die instead.

When he is placed on trial, Kobra denies claims of terrorism, claiming to be an enlightened soul (a bodhisattva) trying to free souls from karmic debt through random acts of violence. Following this, his followers threatened to kill the media outside the courthouse with bio-engineered suicide bomb implants. Holding everyone hostage with this tactic, he was allowed by the JSA to escape, leading to an outraged Black Adam and Atom Smasher, who both subsequently choose to leave the team. In JSA #51, Atom Smasher, Adam, Northwind, and Brainwave track Kobra to his headquarters in the Himalayas, where Adam kills him.

=== Jason Burr ===
Jason Burr as Kobra, on the cover of Face of Evil: Kobra #1 (January 2009). Art by Andrew Robinson.

Jeffrey's twin brother Jason is resurrected by Kobra, possibly through the use of Kobra's Lazarus Pits. This involves the death of an entire facility of Checkmate agents, including several of Burr's friends. Jason reveals that he is re-structuring the organization and killing all the old members. Before revealing himself as the new Kobra, Jason spends time undercover as a Checkmate agent.

=== King Kobra ===
An unidentified King Kobra is introduced in the "Convergence" storyline and later appears in the DC Rebirth relaunch. After Lady Eve makes off with Helga Jace, King Kobra plans to raze a town in Markovia if his demands are not met. When the Suicide Squad joins the fight and rescues Katana from Lady Eve, they and Katana find King Kobra outside Castle Markov. King Kobra later shows Jace the powers of a comatose girl that she was watching. King Kobra reveals that he caught an Aurakle and tells Jace to weaponize it. During the Suicide Squad's fight with King Kobra's forces, Katana and Enchantress find that King Kobra had Jace fuse Violet Harper with the Aurakle. King Kobra activates an implant in Violet's neck, only for Violet to tear it out as the Aurakle gains control of Violet's body. King Kobra, Katana, and Enchantress fight Violet who is now a vessel for the Aurakle under the name of Halo. After Katana uses the Soultaker on Lady Eve, King Kobra escapes.

== Kobra organization ==
Kobra Blackadders vs Checkmate Knight

The Kobra organization survived Jeffrey Burr's death and begins recruiting new members. Kobra has many specialized sub-sections, including the Blackadders, a group of ninja-like fanatics.

In the past, Kobra operated an aggressive metahuman research and recruitment program. This program gave birth to both known versions of Strike Force Kobra which fought the Outsiders on different occasions.

The new Kobra has several ranks: low-level members are Lanceheads, higher-level members are called Nagas, and the highest level shown are the Bestowed, mystics who specialize in Blood Magic.

== Other versions ==
- Jeffrey Burr appears in Kingdom Come as a member of Lex Luthor's Mankind Liberation Front.
- King Kobra appears in Lil Gotham.

== In other media ==
=== Television ===
- A futuristic incarnation of the Kobra organization appears in series set in the DC Animated Universe (DCAU). This version of the group is a global terrorist organization primarily consisting of scientists with an obsession for reptiles and dinosaurs, envisioning the latter as the only lifeform capable of ruling the world and seeking out ways to splice humanity with dinosaur DNA. To better emulate the species they admire, Kobra's members have conducted tests on kidnapped people, transformed themselves into reptilian creatures, and used cutting-edge technology for robberies, extortion and terrorism.
  - Kobra first appears in Batman Beyond. Introduced in the episode "Plague", Kobra later appears in the two-part episode "Curse of the Kobra", where it is revealed that they genetically engineered and trained the perfect leader for their organization, whom they named Zander, due to lacking cohesive leadership. After coming of age, Zander leads the organization in transforming their operatives into dinosaur hybrids and attempting to raise the Earth's temperature using a thermal bomb so that they can rule in the aftermath. However, they are foiled by Batman, Max Gibson, and Kairi Tanaga and Zander is presumed dead.
  - Kobra appears in the Static Shock episode "Future Shock".
- The Kobra cult appears in the teaser for the Batman: The Brave and the Bold episode "Requiem for a Scarlet Speedster!", with their leader voiced by Robin Atkin Downes.
- The Jeffrey Burr incarnation of Kobra and his cult appear in the Young Justice episode "Drop Zone", voiced by Arnold Vosloo. This version is a martial artist and ally of the Light.
- Jason Burr appears in Beware the Batman, voiced by Matthew Lillard. This version is the inventor of the Ion Cortex, a device that could potentially manage the world's power. Throughout the series, Batman and Katana protect Burr from the League of Assassins after they target him and the Ion Cortex. After being attacked and possessed by League of Assassins member Cypher, Burr secretly contacts the League's leader, Lady Shiva, and finishes the Ion Cortex for her. While Batman and Katana free Burr from Cypher's control so he can disable the Ion Cortex, Shiva uses the Soultaker sword on him before he can finish.
- The Kobra cult appears in Beast Boy: Lone Wolf.

=== Film ===
- The Jeffrey Burr incarnation of Kobra appears in Batman: Soul of the Dragon, voiced by Josh Keaton. This version was kidnapped and brainwashed by the Kobra cult as a child to be their savior. In the present, he plans to unlock a gate at Nanda Parbat to unleash the serpent god Nāga by offering children's souls via the Soul Breaker sword. After his forces are defeated by Lady Shiva, Richard Dragon, Ben Turner, and Batman, they plead with a desperate Burr to reject Kobra. Ultimately, Burr stabs himself with Soul Breaker, killing him and unleashing Nāga.
- The Kobra cult appears in Batman: Knightfall. Several members were gathering for a meeting in the Gotham City docks where they were attacked by Azrael.

=== Miscellaneous ===
- The Jeffrey Burr incarnation of Kobra appears in issues #16 and #17 of the Young Justice tie-in comic book.
- The first King Kobra appears in Batman '66.
- An alternate universe version of Kobra appears in the Justice League: Gods and Monsters Chronicles episode "Big", voiced by Bruce Thomas.
