= Jim Berry (cartoonist) =

American cartoonist (1932–2015)

- Born: James Osmyn Berry; January 16, 1932 Chicago, Illinois, U.S.
- Died: March 20, 2015 (aged 83) Boynton Beach, Florida, U.S.
- Area: Artist
- Notable works: Berry's World

Signature
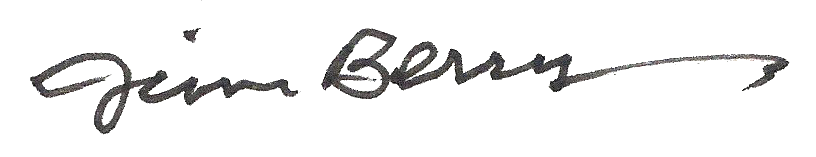

James Osmyn Berry (January 16, 1932 – March 20, 2015) was an American comic strip artist.

Berry was born in Chicago in 1932 and attended Dartmouth College and Ohio Wesleyan University.

In 1961, Berry began working for the Newspaper Enterprise Association.

His most notable work may well be the syndicated editorial cartoon Berry's World, distributed six days a week for more than 40 years beginning in 1963. There was also a Sunday comic strip version of the strip, about which he stated "I enjoy working in color on the Sunday pages and having all that space in which to draw".

The National Headliner Award was presented to Berry in 1967. Berry won the National Cartoonists Society award for Best Special Feature in 1970 and 1972. He also produced the comic strip Benjy in 1974 and 1975.

He wrote with Denny O'Neil the novel Dragon's Fist. O'Neil adapt later this story in Richard Dragon, Kung Fu Fighter

He retired on January 1, 2003 and died on March 20, 2015.
