= Richard Dragon =

- Richard Dragon on the cover of Batgirl (vol. 6) #8 (2024). Art by Reiko Murakami.

Publication information
- Publisher: DC Comics
- First appearance: Dragon's Fists novel (1974); Comics: Richard Dragon, Kung-Fu Fighter #1 (April–May 1975)
- Created by: Dennis O'Neil (writer); Jim Berry (writer); Leopoldo Durañona (artist)

In-story information
- Alter ego: Richard Drakunovski
- Species: Human
- Team affiliations: G.O.O.D. League of Assassins; FBI
- Partnerships: Bronze Tiger; Lady Shiva
- Supporting character of: The Question; Huntress
- Notable aliases: Richard Dragon; Master of Kung-Fu; The Dragon
- Abilities: Master martial artist, skilled thief, accomplished philosopher, and proficiency in qi manipulation

Richard Dragon (or simply Dragon) is a superhero appearing in American comic books published by DC Comics. The character was created by Dennis O'Neil and James R. Berry in the novel Kung Fu Master, Richard Dragon: Dragon's Fists (1974) under the shared pseudonym "Jim Dennis". O'Neil later adapted the character for DC Comics. Since his creation, he is credited as one of the most accomplished martial artists in the DC Universe.

Having varied backgrounds, Richard Drakunovski was originally a teenage thief in Kyoto raised and trained in martial arts by instructor O-Sensei and alongside long-time friend Bronze Tiger. As adults, the pair used their skills as vigilantes and special agents alongside Lady Shiva to fight for justice. An alternate background depicts him as poor youth from Detroit taken in as a student of Ben Turner, becoming a master in his own right and a trainer to various heroes. Recent stories take aspects of these different histories, making him a hero, instructor, and having been affiliated with the League of Assassins as a benevolent figure until he is killed by one of his former students, who succeeds him and takes his name.

Richard Dragon has been adapted in media, making his first animated appearance in Batman: Soul of the Dragon, voiced by Mark Dacascos with a revised design inspired by Bruce Lee. His successor, Richard Diaz Jr., appears in Arrow, portrayed by Kirk Acevedo.

== Publication history ==
Richard Dragon was originally created by Dennis O'Neil and James R. Berry in the novel Kung Fu Master, Richard Dragon: Dragon's Fists (1974). His first comic-book appearance was in Richard Dragon, Kung-Fu Fighter #1 (April–May 1975).

== Characterization ==
A martial artist in the DC Universe, Dragon was once presented as among the best on Earth, on par with both Bronze Tiger and Lady Shiva. He is officially described as a peaceful man who uses his abilities as a last resort. As a supporting character, he also often acts as a martial arts instructor and trainer for numerous non-superpowered vigilantes.

=== Fictional character biography ===
==== Pre-Crisis on Infinite Earths ====
As a teenage sneak thief in Japan, young Richard Dragon broke into a dojo outside of Kyoto to steal a priceless jade Buddha. Before he could get away, Dragon was caught and beaten by the dojo's teenage student, Ben Turner. O-Sensei, the dojo's master, saw something worth nurturing in Richard, and for the next seven years taught Ben and Richard, side by side, mastery of the martial arts. Richard came to find an inner peace, only using his skill when absolutely necessary. Once he felt there was nothing more he could teach them, O-Sensei left the two. Turner and Dragon were recruited by Barney Ling, head of the law-keeping espionage agency known as G.O.O.D. (Global Organization of Organized Defense), to join the organization. Together, Ben and Richard would defeat the corrupt businessman Guano Cravat, foiling his plans to instigate a war for his own benefit. The pair established a dojo of their own in Manhattan, and Richard would go on to battle international threats such as Telegram Sam, the Preying Mantis, the League of Assassins, and eventually his former superior, Barney Ling.

Thirsty for revenge, Cravat would arrange for the murder of Carolyn Wu-San, one of O-Sensei's god-daughters. Aided by Barney Ling, Cravat tricked Carolyn's sister, Sandra Wu-San, into believing Dragon was the murderer. Blinded by anger, Sandra transformed herself into a living weapon and trained to exceed Dragon's abilities. When the two masters finally met in battle, however, Dragon was able to show Sandra that Cravat had deceived her. This plunged Sandra into existential despair, as she now had nothing to live for. Dragon chose to help her, using the spirituality he had learned from O-Sensei to help overcome her fear. Sandra ceased using her birth name and assumed the identity of "Lady Shiva". She fought crime with Dragon and Ben Turner until the three parted ways. Turner, brainwashed by the villainous Sensei of the League of Assassins, became the renegade Bronze Tiger. Dragon decided to retire, devoting himself to teaching others. Lady Shiva became one of the world's greatest assassins.

==== Post-Crisis on Infinite Earths ====
Richard as he appeared in The Question

After the character's title was canceled, Dragon became a supporting character in the 1980s series, The Question. The title character of that book, Vic Sage, was a masked crime-fighter based in Hub City, who came into conflict with Lady Shiva. After all but killing The Question, Shiva sent him to see Richard Dragon for training. Sage's stubborn streak made him near impossible for most people to teach. However, when he met Dragon he found himself reluctant to challenge his new sensei because Dragon was in a wheelchair. Richard trained The Question both in martial arts and eastern philosophy, forcing him to question his world view and let go of much of his anger. Of note, he loosely quoted Zhuangzi's story "The Butterfly Dream". Richard would start referring to his student as "Butterfly" because of this. Richard said that Shiva had saved Sage because she saw a passion for combat in him while Richard, on the other hand, thought that Sage's passion was for curiosity. Regardless, Richard realized that for Sage to have a spiritual awakening he had to first let go of the self-destructive behaviors that Hub City brought out in him. Thus, Richard sent Sage back home. As he left, Sage met Shiva again, and the two briefly sparred. She explained that this fight had been for her to test her own perceptions. She thought she had seen a "warrior's passion" in him that was lacking skills and felt that she had been proved correct since he faced her a second time knowing she had destroyed him the first. Shiva concluded that she had been right about him and Richard wrong, but Sage proposed that maybe he had just been curious what would happen if they fought again, which would make Richard right. Sage adopted the identity of The Question again, futilely trying to save the city.

Just as Sage's doomed efforts to save Hub City threatened to destroy him, Dragon arrived to advise his student. Dragon finally convinced Sage that his crusade to save Hub City was no longer doing anything but destroying him. When Sage collapsed from exhaustion and his injuries, Richard revealed that he was capable of using his legs perfectly, and put Sage in the wheelchair. Dragon had realized he would need the chair to make Sage let down his defenses - Sage was so "full of macho" that he would never have listened to him otherwise.

The chair had not been just a charade, however. Richard revealed that he had allowed himself to be handicapped as part of his own learning process, going on to state "I was a teacher then. I am about to become something else. So I discard that option". The city had truly degenerated by this point with all pretense of law and order long lost. Richard, who had thought his studies had put him beyond such things, found himself shocked and horrified by the actions of people in Hub City. For example, a man was using a dead baby to try and beg for 'milk money'. When Richard and the others uncovered this, he tossed the body into a nearby trash can.

Dragon wordlessly met Lady Shiva, who had arrived on the outskirts of Hub City in the helicopter that was to take Sage and Dragon away - she wished to go toward and enjoy the chaos that Sage and Richard were rejecting. Shiva uses force and threats to ensure the pilot would do what she wishes.

Dragon as sensei to Barbara Gordon

Richard next appeared as sensei to Oracle. With his past experiences as a guide, he convinced her that being in a wheelchair did not mean losing the strength she had once wielded as Batgirl. Dragon spends months training her in escrima, the Philippine art of stick fighting, and Barbara was able to take up the mantle of Oracle with the confidence that she was no longer helpless to protect herself.

Dragon as Sensei to Helena Bertinelli

Not long after that, the masked heroine Huntress became the main suspect in a series of murders. Realizing that her headstrong nature would likely mean her death this time, The Question saved her from her many pursuers (including the police and Batman), and took her to Richard Dragon. Seeing many similarities between her and The Question, Dragon helped teach the adventuress to control her anger and "slow down". When Huntress later joined the Birds of Prey, Dragon aided her in fighting the Twelve Brothers in Silk, an Asian martial arts squad that protected a major heroin distributor.

In 2004, the title was revived and the character revamped by Chuck Dixon and Scott McDaniel, only to be canceled after twelve issues. In this short series, Richard Dragon is a bullied school kid who enrolls in a karate dojo to better himself. His sensei, a "mail order" black belt, is beaten and humiliated by Bronze Tiger. Seeing much greater potential in Dragon, Bronze Tiger passes on what he knows to the young man, which includes the knowledge of how to kill. He eventually meets and falls in love with Lady Shiva. Although he wins the martial arts tournament she is watching, she chides him for not being able to live up to the powerful name of "Dragon". Shiva becomes Dragon's lover and instructor, and the series touches on their now strained relationship.

The series begins with the Tiger locating Dragon, who has become suicidal and now fights only in "death matches". He agrees to help Dragon resolve his problems with Shiva if he agrees to stop killing. In tracking Shiva, they are confronted by Nightwing and Connor Hawke. Nightwing alludes to Dragon "training" him through Bruce Wayne, who had been one of Dragon's former students and then trained Nightwing in the same manner.

At the end of the series, Dragon and Shiva are pitted in combat. Dragon gains the upper hand in the fight, and as he begins to deliver his death blow, Shiva's devout followers rush to save her, knocking Dragon away. Unhappy at this disturbance, Shiva attacks and possibly kills her followers before returning to kill Dragon with her signature move, the Leopard Claw. Dragon is resurrected by the demonic Neron, who wants Dragon to kill Shiva. Dragon refuses and walks away from Neron, saying that both had held up their parts of the agreement.

Richard Dragon appears in the series 52, where he begins training former Gotham detective Renee Montoya in the city of Nanda Parbat. His appearance matches that of the Richard Dragon seen before the Dixon reboot (albeit with a full head of long hair, as when training Question and Oracle, rather than balding when training Huntress). In this story, Dragon makes references to a conversation he had with the Question in the Question series, contradicting at least some of Chuck Dixon's Richard Dragon series. The 52 series is also where Richard's former student, Vic Sage, dies from cancer.

==== New 52 onwards ====
In 2011, The New 52 rebooted the DC universe. Richard Dragon was visited by Ricardo Diaz Jr. and trained him in martial arts. When Richard Dragon tried to teach him about peace, patience, and compassion, Ricardo killed him without hesitation, as he felt that a martial artist of Dragon's caliber did not deserve to live if he spoke of "peace". Ricardo then adopted "Richard Dragon" as an alias to symbolize that he had "taken" his fallen master's power.

=== Powers and abilities ===
Dragon is described as a virtual master of all unarmed martial arts styles (and martial arts-related weaponry), including: Kung-Fu, Karate, Akido, Jujutsu, Karate, Ninjutsu, and Dim Mak. He is also able to manipulate his own qi and is a skilled thief. While possessing no inherent powers, Dragon's martial prowess creates the illusion of having metahuman abilities. He is also aided by a totem known as the Dragon's Claw, a claw carved out of jade believed to possess mystical properties although it has been speculated to alternatively as a focal point for his concentration and has no abilities on its own. During moments of intense adversity, the Dragon's Claw enables Dragon to mystically collect and direct his own qi.

== Supporting cast ==
In Richard Dragon, Kung-Fu Fighter, the character has an established supporting cast, most prominently Ben Turner and Lady Shiva, fellow martial artists and peers. Turner is Dragon’s best friend, while Shiva is introduced later in the series, initially seeking to avenge her sister before eventually aiding Dragon and Turner on espionage missions around the world. They are assisted by Barry Ling, the spymaster of G.O.O.D. who assigns them missions across the globe, and O-Sensei, a elderly martial arts grandmaster who trained both Ben and Dragon and is the godfather of Lady Shiva and her deceased sister. The series also has short-lived Carolyn Wu-San, Lady Shiva's older sister, as a love interest for Dragon. However, the 2000 Richard Dragon series by Chuck Dixion alters various dynamics, alternatively making Bronze Tiger his most prominent supporting character as his best friend, former martial arts instructor, and mentor-figure.

=== Enemies ===
The most significant of enemies for Richard Dragon is the League of Assassins and one of their associates, Professor Ojo. Barry Ling has also been a antagonist in different eras; his original pre-Crisis story revealed him to be morally corrupt whereas his post-Crisis version made Ling a morally corrupt FBI agent who blackmails him into aiding him. In Dixon's Richard Dragon, Lady Shiva appears as both an antagonist and love interest. The Circle of Six, a group of martial artist of differing backgrounds serving Shiva, also appear as major antagonists. They consist of Hwa Rang Ree (South Korean), Iron Aron Abromowitz (Israeli), Joey N'Bobo (Angolan), the mysterious Sidney Shiang (aka Tengu) whose origin indicates Southeast Asian, Wam Wam (Dutch), and Kitty Kumbata, an Asian-American raised in Texas that once trained under Dragon in Muy Thai.

== Other versions ==
Ricardo Diaz Jr. in Green Arrow (vol. 5) #23 (October 2013 DC Comics), art by Andrea Sorrentino

- Richard Dragon (Ricardo Diaz Jr.), the successor of Richard Drakunovski, first appears in Green Arrow (vol. 5) #23 (2013). The son of a drug kingpin killed John Diggle (posing as Green Arrow) who desires revenge for his father's death, he is trained in martial arts by the Richard Dragon, an associate of the League of Assassins. Despite his attempt at teaching him compassion and patience, he instead kills him and takes his moniker. Diaz later places a 30-million-dollar bounty on Green Arrow, which three members of the Longbow Hunters (Brick, Killer Moth, and Red Dart) intend to split. Green Arrow is able to defeat all of them with the help of his young half-sister, Emiko. Green Arrow is then reunited with his old partner, John Diggle, after Dragon attempts to kill Diggle by defenestration. In a fight against both Arrow and Diggle, Dragon is able to significantly injure both of them, but is ultimately defeated. A superb martial artist with a strategic mind and tactical abilities, Diaz is capable of assessing an individual's attributes (height, weight, and other characteristics), allowing him to predict others and has reflexes capable of catching arrows.
- Richard Dragon Jr. debuted in Robin (vol. 3) #1 (2021). Created by Joshua Williamson and Gleb Melnikov, the character is implied to be the son of the original Richard Dragon. He participates in the League of Lazarus before Talia al Ghul offers him membership in the League of Shadows.

== Reception ==
In literary analysis, the character and stories involving Richard Dragon have been criticized for cultural appropriation, containing elements of Orientalism, and reinforcing the “white savior” trope in a manner similar to Iron Fist (Danny Rand). S.W. Sondheimer from Book Riot was critical of Dragon's characterization throughout his history in the DC Universe, particularly of Carolyn Wu-San's characterization being reminiscent of a damsel-in-distress in his original series and Lady Shiva's dynamic with him in both his original and Dixon reboot series.

Matthew Pustz argues in Unstable Masks: Whiteness and American Superhero Comics that while featuring a diverse cast of prominent martial artists, most notably Lady Shiva and Ben Turner, and Asian teachers and traditions provide knowledge, the narrative presents such knowledge as something which Dragon (a white hero) can appropriate and perfect. Consequently, Asian culture and tradition are a source of his exceptional abilities while excluding the cultural roots of those who developed them, and both Shiva and Turner are subordinate to the white protagonist. In this context, he exemplifies a form of whiteness that absorbs and appropriates them while retaining his role as the narrative’s central figure.

== In other media ==
- Richard Dragon appears in Batman: Soul of the Dragon, voiced by Mark Dacascos. This version is visually inspired by Bruce Lee's character, Lee, from Enter the Dragon.
- Ricardo "Dragon" Diaz appears in media set in the Arrowverse, portrayed by Kirk Acevedo as an adult and Max Archibald as a young man. This version is based upon the New 52 version of the character, Ricardo Diaz, Jr.
  - Primarily appearing in Arrow, this version is an arsonist, crime lord, and drug dealer with dragon tattoos on his neck and left shoulder. In the sixth season, he manipulates Cayden James into helping him take control of Star City before Oliver Queen exposes and captures everyone on Diaz's payroll, forcing him to go into hiding. In the seventh season, Diaz seeks revenge by targeting Queen and his family, hiring the Longbow Hunters to assist him and taking a drug that grants super-strength, but is captured by Emiko Queen and Team Arrow. Incarcerated at Slabside Maximum Security Prison, Diaz is recruited into A.R.G.U.S.'s Ghost Initiative to help them locate Ninth Circle financier Dante, through whom Diaz hired the Longbow Hunters, though Diaz betrays them to help Dante escape. He is subsequently returned to Slabside, where Emiko kills him to prevent him from revealing information on the Ninth Circle.
  - An alternate version of Diaz who became a police officer after John Deegan rewrote reality makes a cameo appearance in the crossover "Elseworlds".
- Richard Dragon appears as a character summon in Scribblenauts Unmasked: A DC Comics Adventure.
