= List of Batwoman episodes =

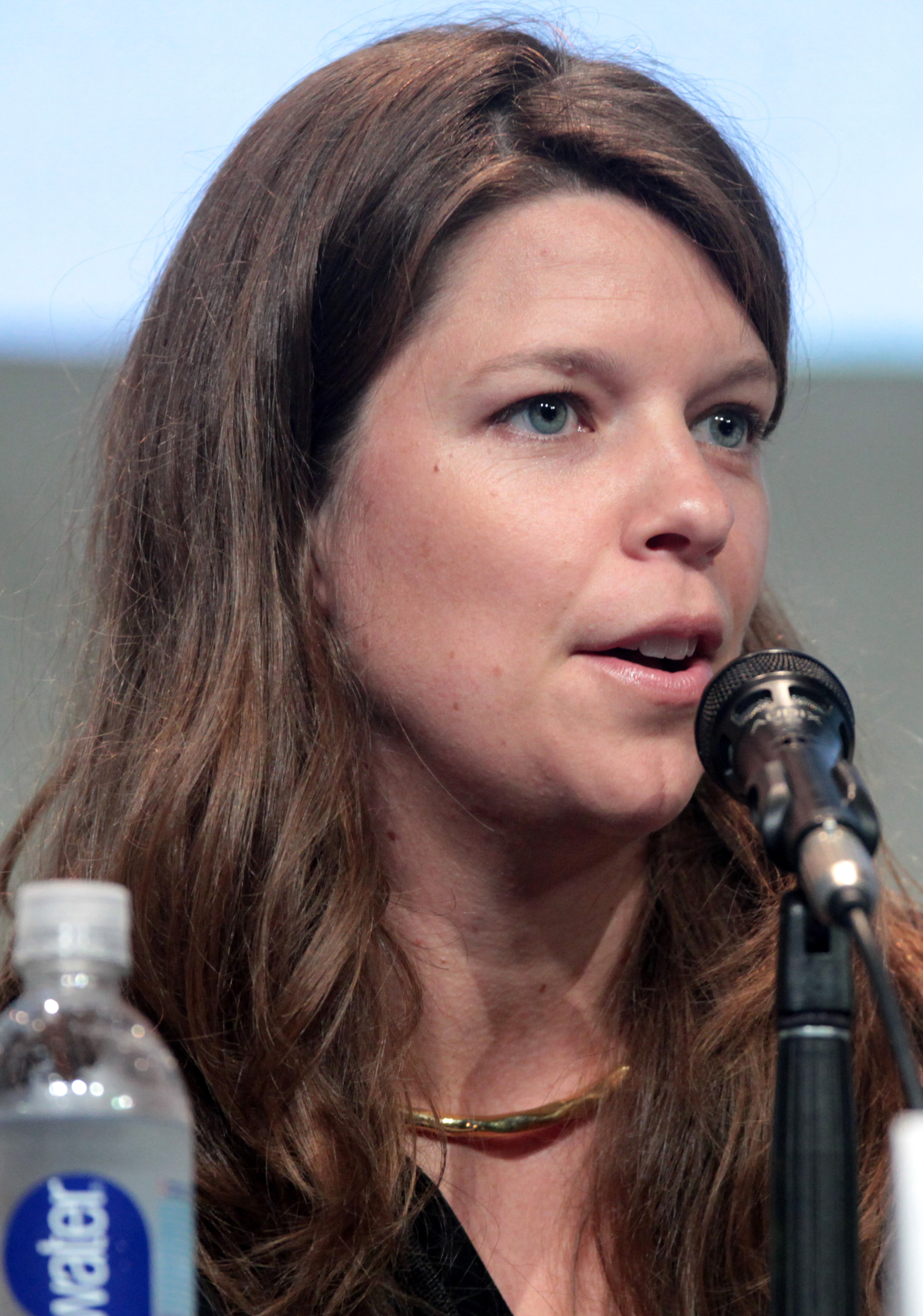
Showrunner Caroline Dries at the 2015 San Diego Comic-Con in San Diego, California

Batwoman is an American superhero television series created by Caroline Dries, which ran for three seasons on The CW from 2019 through 2022. It is set in the Arrowverse, sharing continuity with other related television series. Based on the eponymous character from DC Comics, the first season follows Kate Kane (Ruby Rose), the cousin of vigilante Bruce Wayne / Batman, who becomes Batwoman in his absence. The final two seasons focus on Ryan Wilder (Javicia Leslie) as she protects Gotham City in the role of Batwoman.

Alongside Rose, the first season of Batwoman stars Elizabeth Anweis, Camrus Johnson, Nicole Kang, Dougray Scott, Rachel Skarsten, and Meagan Tandy. Anweis's character was killed off in the first season's midseason finale, "A Mad Tea-Party". In May 2020, Rose announced her departure from the series. The following month, Leslie was cast as Ryan Wilder, an original character, to replace her. Scott departed in the 16th episode of season two, "Rebirth". In the third season, Victoria Cartagena, Nick Creegan, and Robin Givens joined the main cast, with Cartagena reprising her role as Renee Montoya from the unrelated Fox series Gotham.

During the course of the series, 51 episodes of Batwoman aired over three seasons. The first season premiered on October 6, 2019, and concluded May 17, 2020. It was renewed for a second season in January. Season two aired from January 17, 2021, through June 27. A third season was ordered in February, which ran from October 13 through March 2, 2022. A fourth season was in development, but was canceled following Nexstar Media Group's acquisition of The CW.

== Series overview ==
Season	Episodes	Originally released		Rank	Average viewers (in millions)
Season	Episodes	First released	Last released	Rank	Average viewers (in millions)
1	20	October 6, 2019	May 17, 2020	117	1.00
2	18	January 17, 2021	June 27, 2021	147	0.50
3	13	October 13, 2021	March 2, 2022	129	0.46

== Episodes ==
=== Season 1 (2019–20) ===
Season one episodes
No. overall	No. in season	Title	Directed by	Written by	Original release date	Prod. code	U.S. viewers (millions)
1	1	"Pilot"	Marcos Siega	Caroline Dries	October 6, 2019	T15.10154	1.86
2	2	"The Rabbit Hole"	Marcos Siega	Caroline Dries	October 13, 2019	T13.21952	1.45
3	3	"Down, Down, Down"	Dermott Daniel Downs	Holly Henderson & Don Whitehead	October 20, 2019	T13.21953	1.22
4	4	"Who Are You?"	Holly Dale	Nancy Kiu & Denise Harkavy	October 27, 2019	T13.21954	1.29
5	5	"Mine Is a Long and a Sad Tale"	Carl Seaton	Jerry Shandy & Ebony Gilbert	November 3, 2019	T13.21955	1.16
6	6	"I'll Be Judge, I'll Be Jury"	Scott Peters	James Stoteraux & Chad Fiveash	November 10, 2019	T13.21956	1.09
7	7	"Tell Me the Truth"	Michael A. Allowitz	Caroline Dries & Natalie Abrams	November 17, 2019	T13.21957	1.01
8	8	"A Mad Tea-Party"	Holly Dale	Nancy Kiu	December 1, 2019	T13.21959	1.01
9	9	"Crisis on Infinite Earths: Part Two"	Laura Belsey	Don Whitehead & Holly Henderson	December 9, 2019	T13.21958	1.71
10	10	"How Queer Everything Is Today!"	Jeffrey Hunt	Caroline Dries	January 19, 2020	T13.21960	0.79
11	11	"An Un-Birthday Present"	Mairzee Almas	Chad Fiveash & James Stoteraux	January 26, 2020	T13.21961	0.67
12	12	"Take Your Choice"	Tara Miele	Ebony Gilbert	February 16, 2020	T13.21962	0.85
13	13	"Drink Me"	Dermott Daniel Downs	Jerry Shandy	February 23, 2020	T13.21963	0.82
14	14	"Grinning from Ear to Ear"	Michael Blundell	Denise Harkavy	March 8, 2020	T13.21964	0.75
15	15	"Off with Her Head"	Holly Dale	Natalie Abrams	March 15, 2020	T13.21965	0.75
16	16	"Through the Looking-Glass"	Sudz Sutherland	Nancy Kiu	March 22, 2020	T13.21966	0.77
17	17	"A Narrow Escape"	Paul Wesley	Daphne Miles	April 26, 2020	T13.21967	0.63
18	18	"If You Believe in Me, I'll Believe in You"	James Bamford	James Stoteraux & Chad Fiveash	May 3, 2020	T13.21968	0.64
19	19	"A Secret Kept from All the Rest"	Greg Beeman	Jerry Shandy & Kelly Larson	May 10, 2020	T13.21969	0.70
20	20	"O, Mouse!"	Amanda Tapping	Holly Henderson & Don Whitehead	May 17, 2020	T13.21970	0.74

=== Season 2 (2021) ===
Season two episodes
No. overall	No. in season	Title	Directed by	Written by	Original release date	Prod. code	U.S. viewers (millions)
21	1	"Whatever Happened to Kate Kane?"	Holly Dale	Caroline Dries	January 17, 2021	T13.22751	0.66
22	2	"Prior Criminal History"	Carl Seaton	James Stoteraux & Chad Fiveash	January 24, 2021	T13.22752	0.62
23	3	"Bat Girl Magic!"	Holly Dale	Nancy Kiu	January 31, 2021	T13.22753	0.71
24	4	"Fair Skin, Blue Eyes"	Menhaj Huda	Ebony Gilbert	February 14, 2021	T13.22754	0.51
25	5	"Gore on Canvas"	Norma Bailey	Daniel Thomsen	February 21, 2021	T13.22755	0.49
26	6	"Do Not Resuscitate"	Holly Dale	Caroline Dries & Daphne Miles	February 28, 2021	T13.22756	0.46
27	7	"It's Best You Stop Digging"	Avi Youabian	Jerry Shandy	March 14, 2021	T13.22757	0.55
28	8	"Survived Much Worse"	Holly Dale	Natalie Abrams	March 21, 2021	T13.22758	0.54
29	9	"Rule #1"	Michael Blundell	Nancy Kiu & Maya Houston	March 28, 2021	T13.22759	0.44
30	10	"Time Off for Good Behavior"	Eric Dean Seaton	Chad Fiveash & James Stoteraux	April 11, 2021	T13.22760	0.48
31	11	"Arrive Alive"	Mairzee Almas	Daniel Thomsen & Daphne Miles	April 18, 2021	T13.22761	0.56
32	12	"Initiate Self-Destruct"	Glen Winter	Teleplay by : Jerry Shandy; Story by : Zack Siddiqui	May 2, 2021	T13.22762	0.43
33	13	"I'll Give You a Clue"	Marshall Virtue	Caroline Dries & Natalie Abrams	May 9, 2021	T13.22763	0.40
34	14	"And Justice For All"	Robert Duncan	Ebony Gilbert & Maya Houston	May 16, 2021	T13.22764	0.35
35	15	"Armed and Dangerous"	Holly Dale	Nancy Kiu	June 6, 2021	T13.22765	0.43
36	16	"Rebirth"	Michael A. Allowitz	Daniel Thomsen	June 13, 2021	T13.22766	0.43
37	17	"Kane, Kate"	Carl Seaton	James Stoteraux & Chad Fiveash	June 20, 2021	T13.22767	0.45
38	18	"Power"	Holly Dale	Caroline Dries	June 27, 2021	T13.22768	0.41

=== Season 3 (2021–22) ===
Season three episodes
No. overall	No. in season	Title	Directed by	Written by	Original release date	Prod. code	U.S. viewers (millions)
39	1	"Mad as a Hatter"	Holly Dale	Caroline Dries	October 13, 2021	T13.23151	0.47
40	2	"Loose Tooth"	Jeffrey Hunt	Chad Fiveash & James Stoteraux	October 20, 2021	T13.23152	0.49
41	3	"Freeze"	Greg Beeman	Nancy Kiu	October 27, 2021	T13.23153	0.42
42	4	"Antifreeze"	Holly Dale	Daniel Thomsen	November 3, 2021	T13.23154	0.52
43	5	"A Lesson from Professor Pyg"	David Ramsey	Caroline Dries & Ebony Gilbert	November 10, 2021	T13.23155	0.37
44	6	"How Does Your Garden Grow?"	Robert Duncan	Jerry Shandy & Natalie Abrams	November 17, 2021	T13.23156	0.41
45	7	"Pick Your Poison"	Holly Dale	Kelly Ota & Emily Alonso	November 24, 2021	T13.23157	0.46
46	8	"Trust Destiny"	Marshall Virtue	Ebony Gilbert & Daphne Miles	January 12, 2022	T13.23158	0.52
47	9	"Meet Your Maker"	Michael Blundell	Caroline Dries & Maya Houston	January 19, 2022	T13.23159	0.44
48	10	"Toxic"	Glen Winter	Caroline Dries & Jerry Shandy	January 26, 2022	T13.23160	0.48
49	11	"Broken Toys"	Camrus Johnson	Chad Fiveash & James Stoteraux & Natalie Abrams	February 2, 2022	T13.23161	0.54
50	12	"We're All Mad Here"	Eric Dean Seaton	Maya Houston & Daphne Miles	February 23, 2022	T13.23162	0.41
51	13	"We Having Fun Yet?"	Holly Dale	Nancy Kiu & Caroline Dries	March 2, 2022	T13.23163	0.42

== Ratings ==
Batwomen : U.S. viewers per episode (millions)

Season	Episode number																			
Season	1	2	3	4	5	6	7	8	9	10	11	12	13	14	15	16	17	18	19	20
1	1.86	1.45	1.22	1.29	1.16	1.09	1.01	1.01	1.71	0.79	0.67	0.85	0.82	0.75	0.75	0.77	0.63	0.64	0.70	0.74
2	0.66	0.62	0.71	0.51	0.49	0.46	0.55	0.54	0.44	0.48	0.56	0.43	0.40	0.35	0.43	0.43	0.45	0.41	–	
3	0.47	0.49	0.42	0.52	0.37	0.41	0.46	0.52	0.44	0.48	0.54	0.41	0.42	–						

Audience measurement performed by Nielsen Media Research
