= Batwoman season 2 =

Batwoman
- Season 2
- Promotional poster
- Starring: Javicia Leslie; Rachel Skarsten; Meagan Tandy; Nicole Kang; Camrus Johnson; Dougray Scott
- No. of episodes: 18

Release
- Original network: The CW
- Original release: January 17 – June 27, 2021

Season chronology
- ← Previous; Season 1 Next → Season 3

The second season of The CW series Batwoman premiered on January 17, 2021. The series is based on the DC Comics character of the same name and set in the Arrowverse continuity. Caroline Dries, who developed the series, returned as showrunner for the season. It is the first season to star Javicia Leslie as Ryan Wilder, a vigilante who succeeds Kate Kane in the role of Batwoman. The main cast also features Rachel Skarsten, Meagan Tandy, Nicole Kang, Camrus Johnson, and Dougray Scott returning from the previous season.

The season was ordered in January 2020 and production began in September. Before the beginning of production, season one star Ruby Rose announced that she would not return to the role of Kate. The character Ryan was created by the series to become the new Batwoman, with Leslie being cast in July. The role of Kate was later recast to Wallis Day, justified in-narrative as Kate being caught in a plane crash and being given plastic surgery to resemble Circe Sionis, the deceased daughter of Black Mask, while also being hypnotized into being her.

== Episodes ==
Season two episodes
No. overall	No. in season	Title	Directed by	Written by	Original release date	Prod. code	U.S. viewers (millions)
21	1	"Whatever Happened to Kate Kane?"	Holly Dale	Caroline Dries	January 17, 2021	T13.22751	0.66
Homeless ex-convict Ryan Wilder is surprised when the crash of Kate Kane's plane from National City yields her a functioning Batsuit, which she uses to try to locate Alice and avenge her foster mother's death. Tommy Elliot, wearing Bruce Wayne's face, moves into Wayne Manor and obtains Luke's remaining Kryptonite fragment. Julia quickly identifies him as an impostor since he is unfamiliar with where her father is living. Elliot steals the Batmobile, goes after Ryan with a gun containing the Kryptonite bullet, and shoots her. The Batsuit protects Ryan enough to recover and beat Elliot unconscious, leaving him to be returned to Arkham. Ryan returns the Batsuit to Luke and Mary but then notices some effects from the Kryptonite wound. With Kate's body still missing, Jacob and Mary vow never to give up the search. Alice reveals to Jacob that Kate was the first Batwoman. After Elliot's arrest, Alice finds a message from Safiyah written on a newspaper article depicting Kate's disappearance, telling her to "consider us even." As Jacob futilely shines the Bat-Signal, Alice tells Mouse's corpse that a war with Safiyah is coming with Batwoman not there to stop it.
22	2	"Prior Criminal History"	Carl Seaton	James Stoteraux & Chad Fiveash	January 24, 2021	T13.22752	0.62
Alice attracts a swarm of bats to Mouse's corpse. A flashback reveals Kate once saved Ryan from a mugging. Ryan finds her prior criminal history prevents her from getting security jobs. She stops a robbery and is questioned by the Crows. Based on a conversation with Sophie, she deduces that Alice is Beth Kane. Alice ambushes Julia and proposes an alliance against Safiyah, then stabs her non-fatally when she refuses. Luke and Mary suspect a crowd demanding Batwoman's return will be Alice's next target. They agree to have Ryan in the Batsuit try to disperse them. Alice confronts Ryan on the roof. They fight, but Alice leaves as the toxic bats attack the crowd. Ryan ends the attack, but many people are infected with the same poison that killed Mouse and Catherine Hamilton-Kane. For unknown reasons, Alice gives Mary a sample of Mary's own blood, which she gives to Hamilton Dynamics to make an antidote from the Desert Rose chemical in it. Luke and Mary agree to allow Ryan to continue to be Batwoman in Kate's absence, as long as she agrees not to kill anyone. Sophie finds Alice and confronts her, but Safiyah's agent Tatiana captures both.
23	3	"Bat Girl Magic!"	Holly Dale	Nancy Kiu	January 31, 2021	T13.22753	0.71
A hit man named Victor Zsasz kills two people and cuts himself for each one. Sophie and Alice wake up on the island of Coryana ruled by Safiyah, who rescued and trained Alice some five years ago. Safiyah tells Alice that she did not kill Kate, shows her Kate's necklace, and claims she is still alive. She demands a service from Alice and returns both to Gotham. Ryan takes a job at the club to satisfy her parole officer Susan Stevens and alters the Batsuit to include a black wig. One of Mary's patients who was treated for a bat bite has a spontaneous remission of her cancer. Safiyah hires Zsasz to steal the list of those treated with the Desert Rose – Batwoman foils his first attempt and then has to defend Mary from his attack on her clinic. She captures Zsasz and is hailed in the press. Mary thinks that Kate is dead, but Alice (and hence Sophie) think she is alive. The Crows investigate a new drug being marketed by the False Face Society. Jacob's tech guys find an image on Kate's salvaged cell phone – a painting by Jack Napier with Safiyah's name scrawled across it.
24	4	"Fair Skin, Blue Eyes"	Menhaj Huda	Ebony Gilbert	February 14, 2021	T13.22754	0.51
Batwoman's pursuit of the False Face Society is interrupted by a young boy who asks her to find his brother Kevin, missing two months. Ryan, who was abducted by "the Candy Lady" at age 12 before being rescued by her friend Angelique, deduces that Kevin has also been taken to be brainwashed and sold to a gang. Alice asks Sophie for her help in finding someone named Ocean for Safiyah in return for which Safiyah has promised to release Kate. Alice reveals that she is to kill Ocean and that she plans to kill Kate. With Luke's help, Sophie finds a lab linked to Ocean, and Alice follows her. They are interrupted by a burglar, but Alice still finds a clue to Ocean's location. Jacob announces a reward for information on Kate. Following a lead, he is captured by the False Face Society whose newest member Kevin is to kill him as an initiation. Batwoman, independently pursuing Kevin, rescues Jacob and convinces Kevin not to kill him. The Candy Lady is arrested and exposed. Ryan agrees to move in with Mary to Kate's old place above her bar. She reconciles with Angelique, now her ex-lover, who is also the burglar.
25	5	"Gore on Canvas"	Norma Bailey	Daniel Thomsen	February 21, 2021	T13.22755	0.49
Safiyah's servant Pike kills a man meeting with Jacob and is then captured by Batwoman. Reluctantly working with Jack and Sophie, she learns before Pike takes cyanide that the Napier painting is a map to Coryana. After sleeping with Ryan, Angelique apologizes for when Ryan was caught with her drugs by two Crows agents and sent to prison. Napier's painting is to be auctioned by a "collective" of art thieves organized by Evan Blake, an old school friend of Kate's. Ryan attends the event with Crow backup and meets Angelique. Before she can change into the Batsuit, a very agile thief named Wolf Spider steals the painting. Hampered by her Kryptonite wound, Batwoman fails to stop him. The Crows pursue him and unintentionally hit him with their vehicle. Batwoman finds him, sees that he is Evan, and takes him to Mary. The painting the Crows recovered is a forgery. Ryan's Kryptonite wound is getting worse. Meanwhile, Alice finds Ocean but refrains from killing him because she feels she knows him. They learn that they were on Coryana at the same time, conclude that Safiyah has erased their memories, kill some of Safiyah's assassins, and escape with the real Napier painting.
26	6	"Do Not Resuscitate"	Holly Dale	Caroline Dries & Daphne Miles	February 28, 2021	T13.22756	0.46
A Hamilton Dynamics lab fails to reproduce the curative power of the Desert Rose. Its leader Dr. Ethan Rogers sends a mentally unstable patient named Aaron Helzinger after the secret. Ryan learns her Kryptonite injury is fatally poisoning her and she apparently needs the Desert Rose to live. Helzinger rams the car carrying Mary and Jacob and takes them both hostage in Mary's clinic. Under duress, Mary tells him about Coryana and then has to confess her illegal clinic to Jacob, who plans to shut it down. Meanwhile, Sophie forces Ryan to betray Angelique by tapping her phone in order to locate Ocean. She finds him with Alice, who has concluded that the two were lovers in Coryana and plotted together to leave with the Desert Rose. After Ocean burns the blood off the map, Sophie takes it at gunpoint and brings it to the clinic, where Batwoman arrives and subdues Helzinger. A masked Rogers then arrives and takes the map by threatening to kill Sophie. Sophie overhears Angelique discovering Ryan's treachery and leaving her. Alice kills a decoy of Ocean and summons Tatiana to retrieve her and the body, while actually still working with the real Ocean.
27	7	"It's Best You Stop Digging"	Avi Youabian	Jerry Shandy	March 14, 2021	T13.22757	0.55
Despite the Kryptonite entering her brain and causing hallucinations, Ryan continues her pursuit of Alice over the objections of Mary and Luke. She takes the Batmobile to visit Angelique as Batwoman in order to find a lead on Ocean. Alice captures Tatiana, who tells her how Safiyah punished Ocean and Alice by having her hypnotist Enigma remove not only their memories of one another but Alice's emerging conscience, leaving the psychopathic side of her personality. The Crows assault the Hamilton lab, but find that Safiyah's forces have killed Dr. Rogers and all his people and apparently destroyed the map, leaving the message "It's Best You Stop Digging". Batwoman follows Angelique's lead to the grow room of Ocean, who is leaving both Gotham and Alice. Batwoman finds Alice there and reveals herself as Ryan, but Alice refuses blame for the death of her foster mother Cora. They fight – Batwoman eventually gets the upper hand but declines to kill Alice when she is chastised by a hallucination of Cora. She later reveals to Luke and Mary that she planted a tracker on Alice so they can follow as Tatiana takes her to Coryana.
28	8	"Survived Much Worse"	Holly Dale	Natalie Abrams	March 21, 2021	T13.22758	0.54
Since Luke appears unable to go, he tells Jacob and Sophie to go to Coryana, but Safiyah's people abduct Jacob and Sophie and take them to Coryana anyway. Ryan as Batwoman takes a potentially deadly adrenaline cocktail injection and stows away on a plane before parachuting into Coryana. She is soon captured, but tells Safiyah about the fake Ocean, for which Safiyah promises a dose of Desert Rose. Safiyah captures the real Ocean and tells Alice she will give her Kate if she stabs Ocean, which she does. However, Safiyah never had Kate at all. Ocean recovers since the dagger's blade had been forged with Desert Rose serum. Safiyah is annoyed at Tatiana and stabs her with the same dagger. Alice gets revenge on Safiyah for deceiving her by burning her reserve of the Desert Rose. Julia reappears and saves Luke and Mary from the assassin Dire-Flail and delivers evidence that Kate died in the plane crash. Luke discovers that Ryan's plant is a Desert Rose sample after Dire-Flail bled on it and begs Sophie to keep her alive long enough to return to Gotham. A disfigured person wearing Kate's necklace is seen somewhere in a sewer.
29	9	"Rule #1"	Michael Blundell	Nancy Kiu & Maya Houston	March 28, 2021	T13.22759	0.44
Jacob and the others hold a funeral for Kate, but Black Mask has Kate captive. One month later, the GCPD is cooperating with Batwoman against the False Face Society. A woman confronts Commissioner Forbes, and later that night she sees him assassinated while she is tagging the police station. She is Sophie's younger sister Jordan and asks for help but will not cooperate with the Crows. Sophie and Batwoman save her from an attack. Angelique claims she will leave the False Faces and wants Ryan back. But Jordan saw a bracelet wore by Angelique, making her the getaway car driver. Batwoman apparently convinces Angelique to cooperate, but Black Mask captures both her and Batwoman. As Black Mask reveals, he started the False Face when his daughter was killed by the last Batwoman. Sophie arrives and rescues Batwoman, who then rescues Angelique, but she confesses to Forbes's sole murder, since Black Mask threatened to kill Ryan. Alice imagines talking to young Kate and seeing her dead cat alive. Julia notices strange memory gaps. Black Mask reveals to a woman that Kate lost her face in the crash. The woman – Enigma – vows that she will forget being Kate Kane.
30	10	"Time Off for Good Behavior"	Eric Dean Seaton	Chad Fiveash & James Stoteraux	April 11, 2021	T13.22760	0.48
Batwoman disrupts the production of Snakebite and only Ocean and Angelique can make more. Jacob is forcibly given Snakebite and he experiences rescuing Beth. Jacob consults with Dr. Rhyme and Sionis leaves more, which he injects again. Alice invites Julia to help her find Enigma, and she learns why she lost her memory. Julia confronts Enigma, but with a syringe in her cane, Enigma brainwashes her and suddenly Julia announces a transfer to Berlin. Jordan opens a youth center, but a new villain "Kilovolt" destroys it with an electrical gun. Batwoman tells a reporter named Horten Spence about a conspiracy to attack youth centers. Kilovolt zaps Spence, but Batwoman rescues him and takes the gun. Luke finds a print on the gun to an incarcerated Michael Kastrinos. Ryan recognizes him and they determine that prison CEO Ellis O'Brien is the mastermind. Batwoman confronts him, whose men have three zappers, but Luke saves her. O'Brien is imprisoned and the youth center is rebuilt. After Ryan convinces Angelique to name names, Black Mask has those who killed Forbes, but still Angelique is released. The False Faces intercept the witness protection transport, kill the Crows agents, and abduct Angelique.
31	11	"Arrive Alive"	Mairzee Almas	Daniel Thomsen & Daphne Miles	April 18, 2021	T13.22761	0.56
Now that Black Mask has Angelique to make Snakebite, he recruits new drivers to move ingredients to his lab. Batwoman stops one of the drivers, only to discover Sophie, disrupting her infiltration. Jacob, still acting erratically, replaces Sophie with Crows Agent Russell Tavaroff on the task force. Ryan convinces Sophie to replace the driver in Mary's car. She completes the fear toxin delivery with help from Luke and his Batmobile AI, and places a tracker in the canisters. Sophie follows the tracker to Black Mask. She is rescued by Batwoman, and they capture Black Mask, but he forces his release by threatening Angelique. Agent Tavaroff finds Batwoman's blood where she and Black Mask fought. Elsewhere, Alice holds Enigma hostage, trying to get her memories of Kate removed. Alice attempts to stop her hallucinations of young Kate, but fails and hallucinates Ocean. The real Ocean breaks into the office and confronts Alice for choosing to kill him. They fight, and Enigma escapes, releasing their memories of one another. Angelique tells Black Mask her Snakebite recipe is unreliable and she must find Ocean. Sophie later examines Mary's car and finds the AI, learning that Ryan is Batwoman.
32	12	"Initiate Self-Destruct"	Glen Winter	Teleplay by : Jerry Shandy; Story by : Zack Siddiqui	May 2, 2021	T13.22762	0.43
Black Mask finally reveals his plan to Enigma and the heavily bandaged Kate Kane. He places a mask – a replica made of the face of his late daughter Circe Sionis – onto Kate, and Enigma triggers her into forgetting all of her memories and to having the memories of Circe. The False Faces interrupt their tryst by tasing Alice and abducting Ocean. When Batwoman tracks Angelique, she finds that Alice killed everyone there and suggests an alliance to rescue both Angelique and Ocean. They work together to free both and destroy the Snakebite they prepared, but Ocean is shot, and "Circe" captures Alice – Batwoman declines to save her. Sophie along with the Bat Team cannot erase the DNA sample from Batwoman, but deletes the Crow database from Ryan, foiling a match. While doing so, Sophie learns Commander Kane is on Snakebite. Now free from the False Face Society, Angelique heads into the Witness Protection Program. Ryan decides to stay in Gotham. Mary re-opens her clinic as Sophie gives her the Snakebite that she found in Jacob's office. Black Mask is about to kill Alice but instead tells "Circe" to take Alice to the basement.
33	13	"I'll Give You a Clue"	Marshall Virtue	Caroline Dries & Natalie Abrams	May 9, 2021	T13.22763	0.40
Five years ago, game show host Arthur Brown threatened to blow up his studio but was caught when his riddle was solved, apparently by Sophie, who won a promotion. Now Brown has escaped from prison and plans to torment Sophie. When Brown gives the clue she is with Mary and Ryan, who work together to rescue her first victim – Brown's daughter, Stephanie. They learn that Stephanie is a puzzle expert, who really solved Sophie's riddle and has a cryptogram written on her. As she and Luke work on the message, the other three search the studio but Ryan and Mary are trapped under a bomb. Ryan has to send Sophie to get help from the Batcave, outing herself. Meanwhile, Stephanie knocks out Luke to confront Brown, who plans to kill her, but Luke recovers to save her. Meanwhile, during Jacob's Snakebite dream with Beth and Kate, Alice calls for help but he thinks he's hallucinating. Later brought to Mary's clinic, Jacob codes. Black Mask and Circe torture Alice but she won't tell them Batwoman's identity, though she reveals that she knows who those two really are. Alice stalls by offering to give Circe a new face – putting it on, she realizes that it's Kate.
34	14	"And Justice For All"	Robert Duncan	Ebony Gilbert & Maya Houston	May 16, 2021	T13.22764	0.35
Black Mask, pleased with Circe's new face, releases Alice. She abducts Enigma and demands that she restore Kate. As Alice goes to find an item, Ocean finds her. Together they return to Enigma, but just as Enigma is just about to tell Alice the trigger word for Kate's hypnosis, Ocean kills Enigma, telling Alice she is better off not getting Kate back. Meanwhile, as two GCPD officers harass a benefit at the club, Ryan confronts them, who arrest both her and Luke (who tried to defuse things). When Sophie confronts the same racist white cops, they also arrest her. The three of them meet a prisoner named Eli. Imani gets a lawyer to get them out. In the meantime, the new Snakebite has transformed many addicts into flesh-eating monsters. One victim finds Mary's clinic where Jacob has recovered, helps Mary with the victims and admits his addiction to her. She isolates a cure, but Batwoman must inject each victim to save them. She tries this, but Agent Tavaroff, against Sophie's orders, leads his Crows to massacre the remaining victims at the church. Sophie ends up quitting the Crows. As Luke leaves a garage and tries to stop Eli from being arrested and going to jail, Tavaroff arrives and shoots Luke in the chest.
35	15	"Armed and Dangerous"	Holly Dale	Nancy Kiu	June 6, 2021	T13.22765	0.43
As Luke is rushed to the hospital in critical condition from the shooting, Tavaroff deliberately lies by claiming to have seen Luke holding a gun while he was stealing the car and later produces doctored video showing this. While Mary prepares a dose of Desert Rose to save him, the comatose Luke hallucinates seeing his father Lucius Fox and Bruce telling him he must decide whether to continue living or join him in the afterlife. Batwoman first interrogates Eli, then Tavaroff, but Tavaroff's equally racist confederate Crows rescues him by hitting her with a car. Mary cannot get past two Crows guards to deliver the cure to Luke, but is able to distract them while Wolf Spider enters the hospital room and does so. Luke eventually wakes up, as just then in his hallucination he decides to die. At Sophie's urging, Jacob confronts and suspends the racist and corrupt Tavaroff, whereupon he assaults him. He and the Crows involved plan to kill him with Snakebite until Batwoman saves him. She challenges Jacob to disband the Crows, which he then does while telling the public the truth about what really happened. As Jacob leaves, Alice tells him about Kate and proposes that they work together to save her. While Ocean gets rid of Enigma's body, Alice suggests that her cane is like that of someone they've seen before.
36	16	"Rebirth"	Michael A. Allowitz	Daniel Thomsen	June 13, 2021	T13.22766	0.43
Tatiana kills the man (in witness protection) blinded by the original Circe. Batwoman has only Mary's help to react, as Luke is off confronting Tavaroff (now free on bail) at a law-enforcement club where he meets John Diggle. Luke out-cheats Tavaroff at poker, but Tavaroff later attacks him outside. Diggle helps him and they talk about their fathers, which inspires Luke to respond to a summons from the Bat-signal. Alice and Jacob bring Circe to the deserted Crow building and try to restore her memory. She somewhat recognizes coming out to Alice, and recognizes Sophie but not Mary. But the Circe personality asserts itself just as the False Face Society capture Jacob and Safiyah captures Alice. Batwoman offers Safiyah her Desert Rose plant for Alice's life. She is impressed and accepts, but vows to destroy what Alice loves most. As Alice rushes to Ocean's lair, she kills Tatiana (using the non-magic dagger) but finds him dead. The GCPD on Black Mask's side arrest Jacob for abetting Alice, revealing her identity on the news. Jacob asks the public to understand Beth as he is sent to a prison in Metropolis. As Circe returns to Black Mask and demands the truth, Safiyah arrives and tells him she deserves it or else she'll tell her the truth.
37	17	"Kane, Kate"	Carl Seaton	James Stoteraux & Chad Fiveash	June 20, 2021	T13.22767	0.45
The Bat-team are pleased with Circe's progress on her memory, showing her Kate's journals and giving her the keys to her bike. She however goes straight to Black Mask and Safiyah, turning over the Batcave's secrets. Black Mask hires most of the remaining Crows, making Tavaroff his lieutenant. Ryan moves back into her van from Kate's old place. She takes a laptop from a low-level employee to learn about the connection between Black Mask and the GCPD, but they track her and arrest her. Susan is skeptical, but finally challenges the cops, who draw a gun on her. Batwoman defeats them and escapes. The unsuspecting Bat-team ask Circe to suit up to help Ryan, but she drugs them, imprisons them, and takes Batman's trove of villainous devices like Joker's acid-spraying flower, Bane's Venom, Clayface's mud, Killer Croc's tooth, Mad Hatter's hat, Penguin's umbrella, and some plants from Poison Ivy to help Safiyah restore Coryana's Desert Rose. Meanwhile, Safiyah visits Alice alone as she scatters Ocean's ashes. She asks Alice to return with her to Coryana, and Alice plays along, but then stabs Safiyah with the magic dagger, temporarily killing her.
38	18	"Power"	Holly Dale	Caroline Dries	June 27, 2021	T13.22768	0.41
Black Mask causes a citywide blackout, and on TV urges the populace to anarchy. Luke searches his father's things and finds there a working Batsuit, built secretly by Lucius. Black Mask injects Bane's Venom and Snakebite into Tavaroff, who flatlines but later revives and attacks Mary. Black Mask covers Circe's escape from Ryan and Alice with most of the Bat-villain items, but Alice subdues him with Joker's acid-spraying flower. Mary thinks that Tavaroff's Snakebite aerosol may work on Kate. As Mary falls, Luke saves her and then defeats Tavaroff. Vesper reads Batwoman's letter to Gotham which inspires them to put Bat-symbols in their windows, which inspires Ryan to continue without the suit. She stops Circe with the Batmobile and helps Alice to spray Circe with Snakebite as both fall into the river. Hallucinating, Alice says goodbye to Ocean and Kate finally rescues Beth – Ryan and Alice revive Kate, who recognizes Beth, just as Alice is arrested. Kate blesses Ryan as Batwoman and plans to leave Gotham, visiting Jacob and Kara before looking for Bruce. At Arkham, Alice tells Ryan that her biological mother is still alive. In the river, various Bat-villain items float away, including Poison Ivy's now rampant plants.

== Cast and characters ==
=== Main ===
- Javicia Leslie as Ryan Wilder / Batwoman
- Rachel Skarsten as Beth Kane / Alice
- Meagan Tandy as Sophie Moore
- Nicole Kang as Mary Hamilton
- Camrus Johnson as Luke Fox / Batwing
- Dougray Scott (Note: Only credited for his respective episode appearances.) as Jacob Kane

=== Recurring ===
- Rachel Maddow as the voice of Vesper Fairchild
- Allison Riley as Dana DeWitt
- Rebecca Davis as Susan Stevens
- Christina Wolfe as Julia Pennyworth
- Leah Gibson as Tatiana / The Whisper
- Shivani Ghai as Safiyah Sohail
- Bevin Bru as Angelique Martin
- Nathan Owens as Ocean
- Peter Outerbridge as Roman Sionis / Black Mask
- Wallis Day as Kate Kane / "Circe Sionis"
- Laura Mennell as Dr. Evelyn Rhyme / Enigma
- Jesse Hutch as Russell Tavaroff

=== Guest ===
- Shakura S'Aida as Cora Lewis
- Sam Littlefield as Jonathan Cartwright / Mouse (Note: Despite the character being dead since the season one finale, Sam Littlefield was still credited for his corpse portrayal of the character in the first two episodes of this season.)
- Warren Christie as Tommy Elliot / Hush and Bruce Wayne
- Alex Morf as Victor Zsasz
- Linda Kash as Candice "Candy Lady" Long
- Aason Nadjiwon as Rudy
- Eli Tsepsio Lamour as Kevin Johnson
- Donny Lucas as Garrett Hang
- Scott Pocha as Pike
- Lincoln Clauss as Evan Blake / Wolf Spider
- R. J. Fetherstonhaugh as Aaron Helzinger / Amygdala
- Milo Shandel as Dr. Ethan Rogers
- Gracyn Shinyei as young Kate Kane
- Ava Sleeth as young Beth Kane
- Jaime M. Callica as Horten Spence
- Samantha Liana Cole as Imani
- Rick Miller as Arthur Brown / Cluemaster
- Morgan Kohan as Stephanie Brown
- Kaiden Berge as Eli
- Domonique Adam as Lucius Fox
- David Ramsey as John Diggle

== Production ==
=== Development ===
In January 2020, The CW renewed the series for a second season. Caroline Dries returned as showrunner.

=== Writing ===
In May 2020, ahead of the season one finale, Caroline Dries announced that Safiyah Sohail would be the Big Bad of season two. Though the character was referenced multiple times in season one, Dries said they "didn't want to waste her or blow out her character in Season 1 when there are all these other hijinks happening", so it was decided to preserve her debut in season two. As the last two planned episodes of the first season could not be filmed due to the COVID-19 pandemic causing production to be shut down, they were changed to be part of season two. Dries said the scripts of those episodes may undergo tinkering. Dries later announced that the season would have another Big Bad in the form of Black Mask.

=== Casting ===
Main cast members Rachel Skarsten, Meagan Tandy, Nicole Kang, Camrus Johnson and Dougray Scott reprised their roles as Beth Kane / Alice, Sophie Moore, Luke Fox and Jacob Kane. In May 2020, Ruby Rose, who portrayed the title role of Kate Kane / Batwoman in the first season, announced she would be leaving the series ahead of its second season; no reason was initially given for her departure. It was mutually decided between Rose, the studio, and the network for her to leave. In August, Rose called being the lead of a series "taxing" and stated her back surgery following an on-set accident in 2019 was a contributing factor in deciding to leave, saying it was "time for me to take a break to fully heal and then return" to acting. Spending time in isolation because of the pandemic also allowed Rose "to just think about a lot of different things and what you want to achieve in life and what you want to do," which allowed her "a great opportunity to have a dialogue about a lot of things" with the producers.

In June, Dries said it was discussed to replace Rose as Kate Kane, as "it would be seamless" for some of the episodes already written. However, with guidance from Greg Berlanti, it was decided to move forward with an entirely new character invented for the series as Batwoman, which would "also respect everything that Ruby put into the Kate Kane character." Dries also felt by using a new character, "it helps the audience" so the writers would not have to "address the elephant in the room". She also revealed Kate would not be killed and her disappearance would be a key storyline during season two. Immediately after Rose's departure, the producers reaffirmed their commitment to the series and finding a new actress of the LGBTQ community to lead future seasons. In July, Javicia Leslie was cast as Ryan Wilder, the new Batwoman.

In September 2020, Shivani Ghai was cast as Safiyah Sohail, Leah Gibson was cast as Tatiana / The Whisper, and Nathan Owens was cast as Ocean, all in recurring roles. In December 2020, David Ramsey was revealed to be reprising his Arrow role of John Diggle in the season. On March 21, 2021, Wallis Day was announced to replace Ruby Rose as Kate Kane with a new face.

=== Filming ===
Filming for the second season began on September 3, 2020. By September 29, filming was shut down because of delays in receiving COVID-19 test results for the cast and crew, but they were given clearance to resume filming a week later. Filming concluded on May 10, 2021.

== Broadcast ==
The second season premiered on January 17, 2021, on The CW in the United States. Episodes continued to be released weekly on Sundays until June 27, 2021.

== Reception ==
=== Ratings ===
No DVR ratings are available before the ninth episode.

Viewership and ratings per episode of Batwoman season 2
No.	Title	Air date	Rating (18–49)	Viewers (millions)	DVR (18–49)	DVR viewers (millions)	Total (18–49)	Total viewers (millions)
9	"Rule #1"	March 28, 2021	0.1	0.44	0.1	0.31	0.2	0.75
10	"Time Off for Good Behavior"	April 11, 2021	0.1	0.48	0.1	0.41	0.2	0.89
11	"Arrive Alive"	April 18, 2021	0.2	0.56	0.1	0.37	0.3	0.93
12	"Initiate Self-Destruct"	May 2, 2021	0.1	0.43	0.1	0.36	0.2	0.79
13	"I'll Give You a Clue"	May 9, 2021	0.1	0.40	0.1	0.35	0.2	0.74
14	"And Justice For All"	May 16, 2021	0.1	0.35	0.1	0.31	0.2	0.66
15	"Armed and Dangerous"	June 6, 2021	0.1	0.43	0.1	0.33	0.2	0.76
16	"Rebirth"	June 13, 2021	0.1	0.43	0.1	0.30	0.2	0.73
17	"Kane, Kate"	June 20, 2021	0.1	0.45	0.1	0.34	0.2	0.80
18	"Power"	June 27, 2021	0.1	0.41	0.1	0.32	0.2	0.73

=== Critical response ===
On review aggregator Rotten Tomatoes, the season holds an approval rating of 86% based on 21 reviews, with an average rating of 7.25/10. The website's critical consensus reads, "Batwoman's second season survives a soft reboot, maintaining the show's excellence while giving Javicia Leslie plenty of room to spread her wings."
