= Elizabeth Anweis =

American actress

- Born: October 3, 1977 (age 48); Ann Arbor, Michigan
- Occupation: Actress
- Years active: 2001–present

Elizabeth Anweis is an American actress. She is best known for playing Catherine Hamilton Kane in the superhero series Batwoman.

== Early life ==
Anweis was born in Ann Arbor, Michigan in 1977.

== Career ==
Some of her early career appearances were in the shows Law & Order: Los Angeles, Grey’s Anatomy, Parks and Recreation, Pretty Little Liars, The Fosters, Twin Peaks, The Affair, 9-1-1 and NCIS: Los Angeles. Her first big role came playing Catherine Hamilton Kane in the superhero series Batwoman. Producers were initially worried that Anweis looked too young to play the mother of actress Nicole Kang but she was ultimately cast in the end. She was cast as Natalie Foster in the thriller series Echo 3.

== Personal life ==
Outside of acting she is also a successful model. She is signed to JLA Talent, Authentic Talent and Literary Management, and Morris Yorn.

== Filmography ==
=== Film ===
Year	Title	Role	Notes
2001	Rush Hour 2	Masseuse	
2002	Bruised	Girl	
2005	Cup of Joe	Kristi	Short
2005	Shackles	Sasha	
2006	Life is Short	Shorty	Short
2007	Hers	Gina 2	
2008	Trail of Crumbs	Chloe	
2008	Last Exit	Lolita	
2010	The Absence	Records Room Worker	Short
2010	Justify	Faith Somersby	
2012	Love at First Heist	Woman	Short
2014	Hers	Gina 2	
2014	Lessons in Love	Anna	
2015	The Shattering	Trinity	
2016	Emotional State	Tash Henotay	Short
2018	The Assassin's Code	Jia Connolly	
2020	Zero F**ks	Kate	
2020	Ghosted	The Ghost	Short
2023	The Caine Mutiny Court-Martial	Lundeen	

=== Television ===
Year	Title	Role	Notes
2011	Law & Order: Los Angeles	Kim Ho Hee	Episode: "Carthay Circle"
2011	Hung	Livonia Yeller	Episode: "Don't Give Up on Detroit or Hung Like a Horse"
2012	Southland	Jongchit	Episode: "Identity"
2012	Rizzoli & Isles	Mrs Johnson	Episode: "Melt My Heart to Stone"
2013	Grey's Anatomy	Brie	Episode: "Walking on a Dream"
2013	Parks and Recreation	Mary-Marie	Episode: "Recall Vote"
2014	Pretty Little Liars	Nurse	Episode: "Thrown from the Ride"
2016	The Fosters	Real Estate Agent	Episode:" Justify"
2017	Twin Peaks	Abbie	Episode: "Part 12"
2018	The Affair	Tria	Episode: "#4.4"
2018	9-1-1	Dr Hina Komatsu	Episode: "Haunted"
2018	NCIS: Los Angeles	Casey Aguilar	Episode: "One of Us"
2019-2020	Batwoman	Catherine Hamilton-Kane	9 episodes
2024	Westworld	The Mortician	Episode: "The Mother of Exiles"
2022	Animal Kingdom	Chastity	Episode: "Hit and Run"
2022	From Scratch	Chloe Lim	2 episodes
2022	Echo 3	Natalie Foster	5 episodes
2023	The Lincoln Lawyer	Hannah Gates	2 episodes
2024	Sugar	Wendy Siegel	4 episodes
2024	Agatha All Along	Lorna Wu	Episode: "Through Many Miles / Of Tricks and Trials"
