= Kate Kane (Arrowverse) =

Fictional character in the Arrowverse

- Arrowverse character
- Promotional image of Ruby Rose as Kate Kane / Batwoman for the Arrowverse's 2018 "Elseworlds" crossover event.
- First appearance: "Elseworlds, Part 1"; The Flash; December 9, 2018
- Last appearance: "Power"; Batwoman; June 27, 2021
- Based on: Kate Kane by; Geoff Johns; Grant Morrison; Greg Rucka; Mark Waid; Keith Giffen; Circe (season 2) by; Robert Kanigher; Harry G. Peter
- Adapted by: Caroline Dries
- Portrayed by: Ruby Rose (season 1) (Note: Also in Elseworlds and Crisis on Infinite Earths.); Wallis Day (season 2); Gracyn Shinyei (young)

In-universe information
- Full name: Katherine Kane
- Alias: Circe Sionis
- Species: Human
- Title: Batwoman
- Occupation: Superhero (in secret); Acting owner of Wayne Enterprises; Leader of the Bat Team; Vigilante (in secret)
- Affiliation: Wayne Enterprises; Paragons; Justice League; False Face Society
- Family: Jacob Kane (father); Gabi Kane (mother, deceased); Beth Kane (sister); Catherine Hamilton-Kane (step-mother, deceased); Mary Hamilton (step-sister); Thomas Wayne (uncle, deceased); Martha Wayne (aunt, deceased); Bruce Wayne (cousin)
- Significant others: Sophie Moore (ex-girlfriend); Julia Pennyworth (ex-girlfriend); Reagan (ex-girlfriend)

Katherine "Kate" Kane, also known by her superhero alias Batwoman and supervillain alias Circe Sionis, is a fictional character in The CW's Arrowverse franchise of TV series, first mentioned in the 2018 episode "Nora" of the television series The Flash, based on the character of the same name, created by Geoff Johns, Grant Morrison, Greg Rucka, Mark Waid and Keith Giffen in 2006, and adapted for television by Caroline Dries. In this version, she is the cousin of famous superhero Bruce Wayne, living in Gotham City, and becomes a superhero in his absence. The character has been portrayed by two different actresses, Ruby Rose and Wallis Day. In the first season of the Batwoman television series, Rose portrayed Kate; when Rose was fired after the end of the season for "multiple complaints" about her behavior, Day was cast as Kate in a recurring role for the second season, while the position of series' lead was taken over by Javicia Leslie as Ryan Wilder, Kate's successor as Batwoman.

This version of Batwoman has also appeared in other series such as The Flash, Arrow, Supergirl and Legends of Tomorrow, for the Elseworlds and Crisis on Infinite Earths crossover events. Kate is a wealthy individual and aspiring businesswoman, having become the acting owner of Wayne Enterprises after Bruce Wayne disappeared. When she learned that he was Batman, she took up his mantle, operating as the vigilante superhero known as Batwoman. After losing her memory following a plane crash, Kate is then taken in by Roman Sionis, becoming the supervillain Circe.

== Concept and creation ==
Kate Kane's version of Batwoman is a relatively recently created DC Comics character, first appearing in 52 #11 in 2006. She has only appeared in live-action in the Arrowverse series and has also made cameo appearances in numerous animated projects. With the announcement that, during the Elseworlds crossover event, Batwoman would make her debut, Ruby Rose was cast as Kate Kane and would later return to the role in her own series titled Batwoman. She also appeared in the crossover event Crisis on Infinite Earths. As of 2022, she has appeared in five out of the seven Arrowverse shows: The Flash, Arrow, Supergirl, Batwoman and Legends of Tomorrow.

=== Characterization ===
Rose said that she took the role too serious, and had a diet, while training everyday, something easy to her after she starred in xXx: Return of Xander Cage and John Wick: Chapter 2. Rose admitted to being a fan of the character before she was cast, and got emotional when she did. She also added that the sexuality of the character, which is lesbian, was an important part of the show, and something that got her on board. When asked if she is a female version of Batman, she said that she is nothing like him, and she is a "game-changing" character. She also said that her character would be a strong woman, and inspiration for all women and young women of the world. Rose left the show in 2020, initially claiming abuse by the studio; however, in October 2021, Warner Bros. and Luke Fox actor Camrus Johnson confirmed that Rose had actually been fired from the series following "multiple complaints about [her] workplace behavior that were extensively reviewed and handled privately out of respect for all concerned" over the course of an investigation that took place over several months.

Taking Rose's place is actress Wallis Day, who would be playing the same character as her; making little changes to her portrayal. When asked what she likes more about the character, she said "Batwoman is awesome, [...], Kate Kane is obviously such a huge character in the superhero world, so playing her is surreal but an honour.", while also saying that she will try to be comic accurate, something the fans want from adaptations of superheroes.

== Fictional character biography ==
=== Early life ===
Kate Kane was born on January 26, 1990, to Jacob Kane and Gabi Goldstein, along with her twin sister, Beth in Gotham City. From an early age, she was very close to her cousin, Bruce Wayne, who was like an older brother to her. On January 26, 2003, Kate and Beth had a bat mitzvah party, and while their mother was driving them home, the Joker hit the car with a school bus, almost throwing it off a bridge. Then, Batman appeared, and stopped the car from falling, and left to arrest Joker. Kate climbed out of the car, but her sister and mother didn't, with the car falling over the bridge. After the incident, Kate's hatred for Batman grew, while his father grew distant from her, during his grief. At some point, the police found her mother's body, but not her sister's. That made Kate obsessed with finding her. On May 25, 2004, her father married Catherine Hamilton, and met her step-sister, Mary Hamilton. Kate accepted Catherine as a mother figure, but not Mary as her new sister. At some point, Kate came out as a lesbian.

Wanting to join her father's security agency, Crows Security, she studied at the military academy, Point Rock. There, she met Sophie Moore, whom she fell in love with. She rose to the top of her class, but was expelled when she and Sophie were caught kissing. Following Kate's expulsion, Jacob suggested that she leave Gotham to travel around the world, training under combat and survival specialists. Sometime in 2013, she travelled to London, and developed a relationship with Julia Pennyworth, daughter of Alfred Pennyworth. Julia revealed to her that she was sent by Bruce to look after her, resulting into the two breaking up.

=== Becoming Batwoman ===
In 2018, she learnt by Mary, that Sophie was kidnapped by a group called Wonderland Gang. She went to Wayne Enterprises to use the company's security system to locate Sophie, and met with Luke Fox, the head of Wayne Security. She tracked the gang in the Burnside Orphanage, saving Sophie, and there she came face to face with their leader, Alice. Kate arrested her, and met with her father, who was furious that she went alone against the gang. She went back to the Wayne Enterprises to talk to Luke, and discovered the Batcave, realizing her cousin's secret identity is Batman. Luke revealed to her that he was devastated by his mistake in the car crush that killed her mother, and felt he had to take care of his cousin. As Kate was observing the Batsuit, she asked Luke to modify it so it would fit her. After that, she found and arrested members of the gang. Later, she went back to the Batcave and examined a knife Alice threw to her, and realized she was in fact her lost sister. Kate started searching for Alice, and revealed to her family her believe that she is Beth, only for Jacob to lecture her, and saying to move on. Kate went to the Batcave, and found other gadgets Batman used and after a discussion with Luke, she decided to become a hero. A suspicious Sophie confronts Kate and asks her if she is dressing up as Batman, with her denying it, saying that if she would be a superhero, she would be Wonder Woman. As Kate asks Sophie to run a DNA test on Alice's knife to see if she is in fact Beth, gang members attacked them, stealing the knife while fleeing defeated. After the attack, she goes to the hospital were a member of the gang is, and releases him, telling him to say to Alice the word "waffles", a word Beth would understand its meaning. Then, Kate went to the Waffle Factory, where Alice was waiting for her, giving her some blood of hers, to DNA test it. Then, Crows Security arrived, and sent her to the Arkham Asylum. Kate, wearing her Batsuit, broke out Alice, letting her go. After the operation, Kate goes to her father, but have a heated argument, leaving to talk to Sophie, in which she expresses her feelings, when she abandoned her in the military academy. The next day, see met with Luke, citing a theory that someone else stole the knife. As she was about to leave Wayne Enterprises, she found a box containing a bat and a letter, revealing that Alice is Beth, and knows that Kate is the superhero dressing up a Batman. Ten days later, in her journal, she wrote that the reason for wearing the Batsuit, was to scare Alice and her gang, but now she can't anymore, while doubting her ability to being a hero. Later, Kate is called into action when someone flashes the bat signal onto Wayne Tower. It turns out it was Alice who called Kate, telling her that Beth is dead. She returns to the Wayne Tower, where is found Tommy Elliot inside Bruce's office, who is there to invite him to a celebration party, only to find out he is missing. Luke then calls Kate to tell her that the only gun that can penetrate the Batsuit has been stolen from one of Wayne Tower's secret weapons facilities. As Kate suspected Elliot to be behind this, she attends his party, and talks to him, learning that he knew Bruce is Batman, and that's why he stole the gun, so that he could kill him. Elliot threatens to kill citizens of Gothan, if Batman doesn't show up. Kate then went to the Batcave and asked Luke to paint a bat logo on her suit, becoming Batwoman. She wore it and went to meet Elliot on the top of his privet building, and fought defeating him. Elliot cuts the robes of elevators in the building, in which Catherine and Jacob are, but Kate managed to save them. As the police take him away to the Arkham Asylum, Kate arrives and he tells her to tell Bruce, that he won't stop until Bruce shows his face. When a thief called Magpie appeared, she had to prove to the people of Gothan that they need her. At some point, Magpie stole Martha Wayne's necklace from Luke. When Kate visited Crows' Headquarters, Sophie expressed her interest on why Kate was investigating when Batwoman was on the case, saying that she doesn't trust vigilantes. She eventually located the thief, and defeats, realizing she is Margot, the photographer taking pictures of the necklace. Afterwards, she goes to the hospital that the gang member is and tells her to look for someone named Mouse, who is above Alice. Kate decided to take over Wayne Enterprises, and run them.

=== Helping other heroes ===
After an altered reality Oliver Queen / The Flash and Barry Allen / Green Arrow, with Kara Danvers / Supergirl from Earth-38, were arrested in Gotham City, Kate bails them out from jail. She took them to Wayne Enterprises, and gave them equipment to use to find whom they were seeking. Kara met with Kate, and discussed the situation, asking if she knew who John Deegan, who altered reality using the Book of Destiny, saying her that he used to work at Arkham Asylum. The trio left for Arkham, where a riot occurred, and Kate went to help them. After reality was restored back to normal, she contacted Oliver to ask him if Deegan was still a threat.

=== Battling Alice ===
Two weeks after the event, Luke tells Kate about "The Skin Pirate", who is being reported as a citizen of Gotham that had hit three morgues in one night, and taken skin from the corpses. After investigating, she finds out it was Alice. Kate dons her Batwoman suit and ambushes Alice and the rest of her Wonderland Gang. She interrogates Alice, and learns that Catherine Hamilton faked her death, and that a man saved her after the car crush, whom she never learnt his name, and kept by force. This man had a son, Jonathan Cartwright / Mouse, and they were friends, who also helped her escape. During their conversation, Kate was drugged by her and Mouse, and taken in a basement. She eventually escaped, and found Mouse, who threaten to kill, if she didn't let go of her father, who was captured when trying to save Kate. The two agreed to leave the scene with the people they wanted, and Jacob finally had no doubts that Alice is Beth. Sometime later in the Crows headquarters, Jacob tells Kate about the man who kept Alice, August Cartwright, a madman with a medical license. Then, the news announced the existence of a new vigilante, going by Executioner. Kate left and arrived to the Batcave, were a happy looking, because of the use of the Batwoman signal, Luke informed her about the Executioner. Kate goes to Sophie, where an assassin was waiting for her and wounded Sophie. She called her "Kate", while wearing her Batsuit, meaning she knew her identity. Kate rushes her to the hospital, where her step-sister works. Luke tracked the warehouse that the Executioner was hiding. Kate goes to investigate, but the Executioner appeared, knocking her out, and taking a hydrogen cyanide gas with him. Luke was able to identify the track he used, belonging to a man named Bertrand Eldon. Kate then broke into Bertrand's home and finds no one there. She locates the hydrogen cyanide capsules, and inside it finds a flash drive. In it, Eldon / The Executioner admits to being guilty of killing innocent people. Kate gave the drive to the police. Then, she finds him and defeat him. Afterwards, Kate meets with her father, and he promises to her to find and help Alice. Sophie, later threatens her that she will expose to her father that she is Batwoman.

When Kate was chasing an assassin called Rifle, she meets Julia Pennyworth and asked her to wear the Batsuit, and pretend to be Batwoman, to distract Sophie. That same night, she met with Sophie, while Julia was after Rifle, who shot her, and the Crows came and arrested her. Kate left and saved Julia, taking her to the Batcave. Luke revealed that Alice hired the assassin to kill Batwoman. As Julia was leaving Gotham, she said to Kate to not allow people to get close to her, a big mistake Bruce Wayne / Batman made. The next day, Kate invited her step-sister to help her open a gay-bar, right across the street of a man who had shown homophobic actions. Sometime later, Kate stole the phone of a gang member, and gave it to Luke to track Alice. Luke tracks her, and Kate went to confront her, only to flee after a lot of gang members arrived. Kate then goes to her father and talks to him, without knowing he is the Mouse. After finding out, she goes to Alice, and she reveals her that the actual Jacob is on the Mouse's cabin. Kate arrived there, but he had already escaped. Later, she went and stopped gang members from kidnapping Catherine and Mary. She then re-confronted Alice, who tells her she poisoned Catherine and as Kate was about to kill her, she was knocked unconscious by the Mouse. Sometime later she went to see her father, who told her that he wants to kill Alice, with Kate responding by saying that she wouldn't stop him.

=== Stopping the Crisis ===
On December 10, 2019, Kate was fighting members of the Wonderland Gang, when Lyla Michaels / Harbinger appeared and teleported her to Earth-38, in the headquarters of the Department of Extranormal Operations. There she joined other heroes, like Oliver Queen / Green Arrow, Mia Queen, Barry Allen / The Flash and Ray Palmer / Atom from Earth-1, and with Clark Kent / Superman, Kara Danvers / Supergirl and J'onn J'onzz / Martian Manhunter fought the Anti-Monitor's forces, not being able to stop them, with The Monitor teleporting the heroes away, while billions of refugees of Earth-38, left for Earth-1. In the Waverider, she observed Oliver's death. She later joined Kara and Sara Lance / White Canary to remember him. In the Waverider, The Monitor informed the team that they have to find the seven Paragons, that can defeat the Anti-Monitor. Kate and Kara travel to another universe to find the "Bat of the Future", who is in Earth-99. There they found Bruce Wayne / Batman, who revealed to them that he killed his universe's Superman and many more people. After Bruce tried to kill Kara with kryptonite, Kate killed him, by kicking him into an electrical system. When they returned to the ship, Ray, who had activated the Paragon detector, revealing that she was the Paragon of Courage. During this, Kate questioned herself as a paragon but Kara was able to give her a pep talk. Kate is then revealed to have taken Bruce's kryptonite he had, but Kara said she can keep it. After that, she and Kara went to question Lex Luthor on how the Book of Destiny works, to stop the Crisis. When a brainwashed Lyla, by the Anti-Monitor, attacked the heroes, Nash Wells / Pariah sent the Paragons to the Vanishing Point, a place out of the timestream. After one month of being in there, Oliver as a superbeing named Spectre, appeared and sent them to the Speed Force, where Kate talked to Ray and Oliver of 2015. Then, Barry took her to the Dawn of Time, where with the other six Paragons, battled the Anti-Monitor's army, and Oliver sacrificed himself to restart the Multiverse.

After the creation of Earth-Prime, she joined Barry, Kara, Ray and Mick Rory to fight a giant Beebo controlled by Sargon the Sorcerer, who was defeated. When J'onn found out that the Anti-Monitor was still alive, Kate, Barry, Kara, Sara, J'onn, Clark, Rene Ramirez, Nia Nal and Alex Danvers assembled to fight him and finally defeated him. Afterwards, she joined Barry, Cara, Sara, J'onn, Clark and Jefferson Pierce / Black Lightning to create the Justice League in the Hall of Justice.

=== Fighting Gotham's crime ===
After the Crisis, a version of Alice, named Beth Kane, appeared on the Wayne Tower on Kate's birthday, and mistaken for Alice. Kate asked her about her life, revealing that in her universe she was saved from the car crush, never being tortured by August Cartwright. Beth was later introduced to Luke and Mary and became friends. When the Mouse kidnapped both the son's Mayor and the son of the Commissioner of the GCPD, Kate went to save them, only to get kidnapped herself. Then, Beth went, pretending to be Alice, to Mouse to trick him, but she failed. Kate managed to save them and go back to the Batcave. Afterwards, Beth started getting sick, a result of the existence of two Beths in the same universe. She had two choose over which one to save, and chose Beth over Alice, but then August appeared seeking revenge, and killed Beth, mistaking her for Alice. Kate was devastated from the event and mourned her death.

Kate learnt about a serial killer, going by "Nocturna", who was draining the blood from her victims. Kate went after her, but was captured. The killer proposed to work together, which Kate declined. As the killer was about to drain her blood too, but the Crows and Sophie arrived forcing the killer to leave. Kate planned to lure the killer in her club she opened, by having a party. During the party, Alice arrived asking where the Mouse is, confusing Kate. She eventually tracked the identity of the killer, Natalia Knight, who had a blood disease. Kate went to find her, and she found Alice who had been tied up by Nocturna and had sent her off to Mary as her blood might cure Nocturna from her disease. She went to the Gotham Cathedral Church, where she found her step-sister, and the killer and her with Alice, fought her defeating her. The same night, Kate meth with Sophie and the two reunited as a couple. Sophie revealed to her that she was fired from the Crows, because she was helping Batwoman.

At some point, a new serial killer, going by "Serial Slasher" appeared, who was attacking digital influencers and tearing their faces apart. Kate decided to investigate, she discovered that the criminal was actually Duela Dent. Kate located and fought her, but she escaped, as she was about to kill her mother, Evelyn. Duela kidnapped an old friend of hers, and as she was about to kill her too, Kate intervened with the assistance of Sophie, and arrested her.

Sometime later, the Bat-Signal went on, and went to the roof, where August was waiting for her. Kate took him in and interrogated him with the help of her father, Jacob. She found that he killed the alternate Beth, and forced Alice, in her childhood, to kill his wife. These two events made Kate kill August. After murdering him, she was reluctant to suit up, causing a copy-cat effect in the city, along with a rise of its criminal element. After a conversation with Mary, she found inspiration to become a hero again. After some time, they learned that Tommy Elliot was in possession of Lucius Fox's book which contained a way to kill the wearer of Batman's suit as it had been a fail-safe in case the suit ended up in the wrong hands. Kate, with Julia, went to find the book, but Kate was captured by the mob. She was able to defeat the mobsters after a lengthy fight, retrieving the book. The same night, it was stolen by an assassin, angering Kate. She located and asked where is it, only to find out that she gave it to Magpie. She later found out that Hush was involved too. Kate manages to find the book, taking it from Elliot. During the next days, she fought a criminal going by "Titan", and started investigating Jack Napier / Joker.

=== Disappearing ===
One day she flew to National City, to meet with Kara Danvers / Supergirl, on whether to destroy the piece of kryptonite she had in her possession. To the flight back to Gotham City, her plane malfunctioned leading to a crash-landing. Kate left the scene of the accident. During her absence, a young woman named Ryan Wilder took up the mantle of Batwoman. Kate was in Blüdhaven, being tortured by Roman Sionis / Black Mask, who blamed her for his daughter's death. She fought his men while they were pulling her from the plane and her face was disfigured.

=== Circe ===
After months of torture Roman later hired Evelyn Rhyme to alter her memory. Eventually, she was transformed into Roman's daughter, Circe, having her personality, and Roman treating her as his own. Roman then sent her to kill Batwoman, but instead brought Alice to Roman. He putted Alice to make a new face for Kate. With the help of advanced technology, her new face became part of her body, being able to bleed and heal. At some point, Alice and Jacob kidnapped her, and ran a DNA test on her, revealing she is in fact Kate. Ryan took her to the Wayne Enterprises, where they are welcomed by a happy Mary. However, Kate doesn't recognize Mary and asks who she is. Then, they realize that the Kate and Circe personalities are fighting for control. Circe took control and went to confront Roman, but Ryan arrived and cured her, with Kate being the sole personality. After that, Kate decides not to take back the mantle of Batwoman, as her successor, Ryan has earned that right. She met with Sophie, telling her that she was leaving Gotham to find Bruce.

== Reception ==
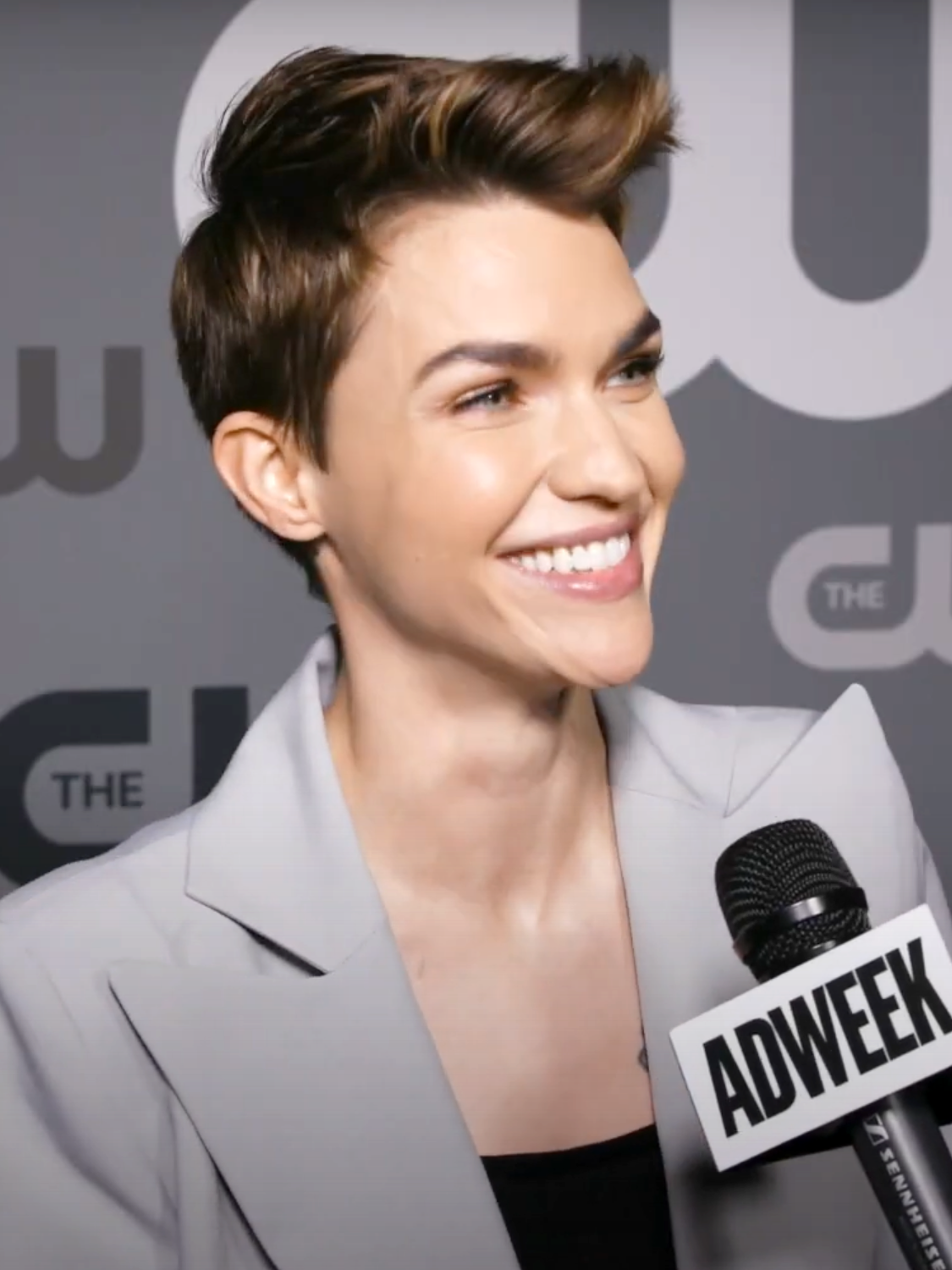
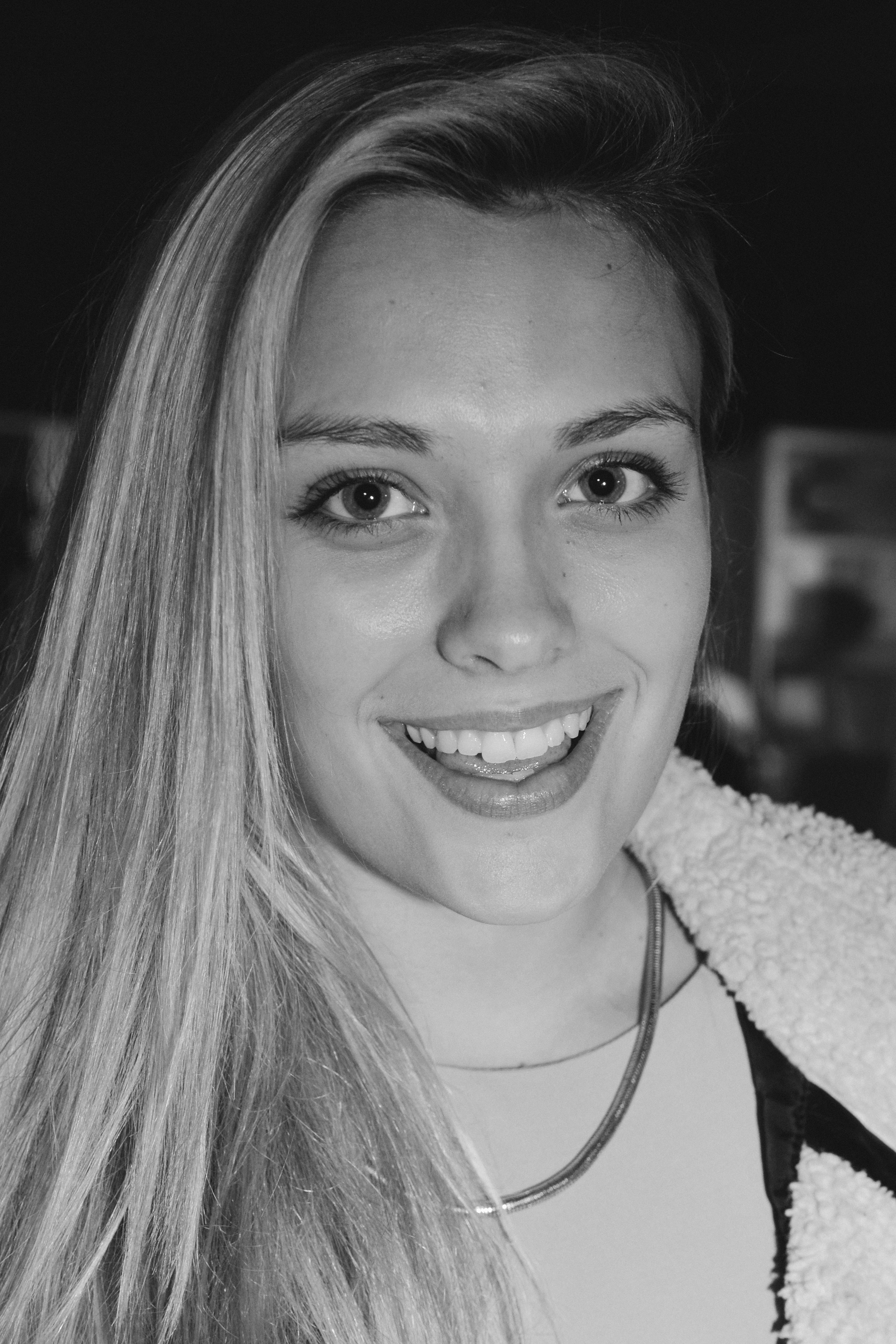
Ruby Rose (left) portrayed Batwoman for Batwoman season 1 while Wallis Day (right) portrayed the character for season 2.

Rose was cast as Batwoman on the CW show The Flash, for the Elseworlds crossover event of 2018. Producers cited the actress' sexuality as part of the reason she was cast, to bring more diversity to the Arrowverse. After her casting, Rose had to delete her Twitter account, citing the backlash from the fans she received, and some online reactions attacked Rose for not being Jewish, while the main focus of the criticism was the assertion that the fact she identifies as gender fluid made her "not gay enough" although some media came to her defence, describing her casting as "perfect", with Stephen Amell, the protagonist of the show Arrow that kickstarted the shared universe, said on Twitter that her "character will carry the universe [Arrowverse] into the future." The critics went to criticize the character, noting that she hasn't received any character development to take up the mantle of her cousin, Bruce Wayne / Batman, and by doing that she became hateable among fans, although some said that she did her best, when everything else was falling apart. After the ending of season 1, Rose was fired by Warner Bros., a move the company justified on the low ratings of the show, but also the fan backlash to her too. In 2021, Rose said that she would be up on returning as Kate Kane, if the studio wanted. In 2021, Wallis Day took the role, leaving the fans surprised, with no clear reactions, with some fans expressing the idea of killing-off the character instead of recasting it.

=== Accolades ===
Awards and nominations received by Batwoman
| Year | Award | Category | Nominee(s) | Result | Ref. |
|---|---|---|---|---|---|
| 2020 | GLAAD Media Awards | TV Performance | Ruby Rose | Won | |
| 2019 | Autostraddle Gay Emmys | Outstanding Performance by an LGBTQ+ Actor in a Sci-Fi/Fantasy Show | Ruby Rose | Won | |

== See also ==
- List of Batman supporting characters
- Batwoman
- List of Arrowverse cast members
