= Wallis Day =

English actress (born 1994)

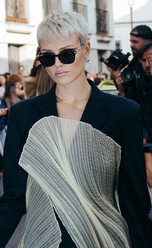
- Day in 2023
- Born: 20 September 1994 (age 32); London, England
- Occupations: Actress; model
- Years active: 2012–present
- Modeling information
- Height: 175 cm (5 ft 9 in)
- Hair color: Blonde
- Eye color: Blue

Wallis Day (born 20 September 1994) is a British actress and model. She is best known for playing Kate Kane in the TV series Batwoman, Nyssa-Vex in the TV series Krypton, and Agent Shin in the film Infinite.

== Early life ==
Wallis Day was born on 20 September 1994 in London. When she was five years old, she became passionate about acting after being taken to see ballets by her father, and joined Stagecoach Theatre Arts at the same age. Day attended the Sylvia Young Theatre School, and later the Arts Educational Schools (ArtsEd).

== Career ==
Day signed on to the modelling agency Models 1 at the age of 13, and was the youngest in the agency for three years. She has stated that she started modelling "to save up to go to drama school". During her tenure as a model, Day modelled for Garnier, Superdry and Nike among others. At 16, she paused modelling to pursue a career in acting. One of her earliest screen appearances was in a commercial for Nintendo 3DS, where she is seen playing Super Mario 3D Land. When she was 17, she landed her first film role as Lucy in Between Two Worlds. Day's first television role was Holly Cunningham in the British soap opera Hollyoaks from 2012 to 2013.

In 2014, Day appeared in a YouTube prank video where she masquerades as the girlfriend of Caspar Lee, and flirts with his roommate Joe Sugg. The video gained over 23 million views. In the same year, she appeared in the music videos for Lea Michele's "On My Way", Arctic Monkeys' "Arabella" and 5 Seconds of Summer's "She Looks So Perfect", and in the seventh episode of the fourth series of Sky One's Trollied. In 2015, Day appeared as Angelica in the television film Casanova, and played Olalla Jekyll/Hyde in the ITV series Jekyll and Hyde. After Jekyll and Hyde, she took a hiatus to study at ArtsEd.

In 2016, Day appeared in the Instagram original series Shield 5 as Amy Williams, and joined The Royals in the recurring role of Angie which she played till 2018. In 2017, she appeared as Cressida Deveraux in the TNT series Will. From 2018 to 2019, Day portrayed the series regular role of Nyssa-Vex, Superman's grandmother, in the Syfy series Krypton. She appeared as Agent Shin in the science fiction film Infinite, released in 2021.

In March 2021, Day was cast to recur in the second season of the CW series Batwoman to take over the role of Kate Kane from Ruby Rose. She debuted in the episode "Initiate Self-Destruct", where the character's facial change is explained. Day also portrayed Circe Sionis. In February 2022, she joined the second season of Netflix's Sex/Life in a recurring role as Gigi, and in August, joined the film Red Sonja in the role of the antagonist Annisia.

== Personal life ==
During her early childhood, Day and her family frequently moved house; in 12 years, she attended in 11 different schools. Day dislikes playing stock characters such as "the girlfriend of the main character or the girl next door"; she has cited her preference for roles requiring more action, including femmes fatales. In the mid 2010s, Day wrote a psychological thriller novel and had hoped to convert it into a screenplay. Day is trained in Mixed martial arts, boxing and Muay Thai. Day declared herself vegan in 2017. She has chosen not to comment on her sexuality, stating in 2017, "Being straight, bisexual or gay is NOT a choice. All I'll say on that matter." She has previously been romantically linked to the American actress Lili Reinhart.

== Filmography ==
=== Television ===
Year	Title	Role	Notes
2012–2013	Hollyoaks	Holly Cunningham	Main role
2014	Trollied	Lily	Guest role
2015	Casanova	Angelica	Television film
2015	Jekyll and Hyde	Olalla Jekyll/Hyde	Recurring role
2016	Shield 5	Amy Williams	Main role
2016–2018	The Royals	Angie	Recurring role
2017	Will	Cressida Deveraux	Recurring role
2018–2019	Krypton	Nyssa-Vex	Main role; 20 episodes
2021	Batwoman	Kate Kane / Circe Sionis	7 episodes
2023	Sex/Life	Gigi	Recurring role (season 2)

=== Film ===
Year	Title	Role	Note
2016	Between Two Worlds	Lucy	
2021	Infinite	Agent Shin	
2023	Sheroes	Ryder	
2025	Red Sonja	Annisia	

=== Music videos ===
Year	Title	Artist
2014	"On My Way"	Lea Michele
2014	"Arabella"	Arctic Monkeys
2014	"She Looks So Perfect"	5 Seconds of Summer
