= Daniel T. Thomsen =

American television writer and producer

- Born: Syracuse, NY
- Other names: Daniel Thomsen, Dan Thomsen
- Occupations: Writer, producer
- Years active: 2002-present

Daniel T. Thomsen is an American television writer and producer.

He is known for his work on the FOX science-fiction series Terminator: The Sarah Connor Chronicles, the HBO series Westworld, and is currently the co-showrunner of the ABC drama series Will Trent.

== Career ==
Thomsen's first writing credit for a television series was on the CBS crime-drama Close to Home. Thomsen was a staff writer on the Fox science-fiction series Terminator: The Sarah Connor Chronicles. He contributed three scripts during the shows two-season run. Following its cancellation, he joined The CW drama reboot Melrose Place and wrote 3 episodes of its only season. Thomsen then worked on the first three seasons of the ABC fantasy/mystery Once Upon a Time. In total, Thomsen had "writing credits on six episodes and producer credits for two seasons" of Once Upon a Time. He wrote the third episode of the HBO science fiction show Westworld with Lisa Joy. The show was nominated for best "Drama Series" screenwriting in the 69th Writers Guild of America Awards. After Westworld, Thomsen wrote for the ABC period drama/science fiction television show Time After Time, the Fox sci-fi series The Passage, and the CW comic book series Batwoman. Thomsen was also a story consultant on the Amazon Prime Video fantasy animated series The Legend of Vox Machina, which is based on the web series Critical Role.
