= Nicole Kang =

American actress (born 1993)

- Born: June 30, 1993 (age 32); Los Angeles, California
- Occupation: Actress
- Years active: 2017–present

Nicole Kang (born June 30, 1993) is an American actress. She is best known for playing Mary Hamilton in the superhero series Batwoman and Lynn Lieser in the thriller series You.

== Early life ==
Kang attended business school in Ohio, where she took theatre as an elective. During her studies, a teacher told her that she was "allowed to want to do this", with regard to pursuing an acting career. As a result, she stole her parents' credit card for an application to New York University where she then auditioned, leaving her father's contact information. Whilst on holiday in Korea, her father received her acceptance letter.

== Career ==
Kang made her on-screen debut in the thriller series You playing the recurring role of Lynn Lieser. She has also made appearances in the comedy drama series Orange is the New Black and the drama series The Code. Her first role came playing Mary Hamilton and Poison Ivy in the superhero series Batwoman. She also played Bev in Swallow which was her first major film role.

== Personal life ==
Kang, along with actress Midori Francis, set up the Asian We Stand collective, providing talks and speeches for professors nationwide, to spread awareness and understanding of the increase in hate crime towards Asian Americans, in the US.

== Filmography ==
=== Film ===
Year	Title	Role	Notes
2017	ABC-Disney Discovers: New York Talent Showcase	Girl	Short
2019	The Social Ones	Jane Zap	
2019	Swallow	Bev	
2020	Ten Minutes To Midnight	Sienna	
2021	Cheyenne	Cheyenne	Short
2025	In Media Res	Kat	
2025	Lo Sguardo	Trinity	Short
2026	The Dark Wyoming	Josie	Short
2026	Just Wait	Alyssa	Short
2026	Jack and Jane	Jane	Short

=== Television ===
Year	Title	Role	Notes
2018	You	Lynn Leiser	10 episodes
2019	The Code	Seo-Yun	Episode; 1st Civ Div
2019	The Feels	Cline	2 episodes
2019	Orange Is the New Black	Kiki	2 episodes
2019	Two Sentence Horror Stories	Hana	Episode; Gentleman
2019	Instinct	Stephanie	Episode; Go Figure
2020	Acting for a Cause	Maria	Episode; Twelfth Night
2021	For Entertainment Purposes Only	Lula	Episode; The Fool
2019-2022	Batwoman	Mary Hamilton	50 episodes
2025	Barbie Mysteries	MC D-DUB	3 episodes
