= Camrus Johnson =

American actor

- Johnson at GalaxyCon San Jose in 2026
- Born: December 22, 1994 (age 31); Kingsland, Georgia, U.S.
- Occupation: Actor
- Years active: 2013–present

Camrus Johnson (born December 22, 1994) is an American actor. He is best known for Batwoman and One Piece.

== Early life ==
Johnson was born in Kingsland, Georgia. He was planning to join the military to follow in the footsteps of his father and brother. After spending two years with the Reserve Officers' Training Corps, he realized it wasn't for him, with his mother encouraging him to try acting.

== Career ==
After several short film appearances, Johnson's first big role came playing Omar Hassabala in the 2019 teen romance movie The Sun Is Also a Star. His biggest role in his career has been playing Luke Fox in the superhero series Batwoman. In January 2022, he made his Batwoman directing debut. In 2026, Johnson will play the recurring role of Mr. 5 in the second season of the fantasy adventure series One Piece.

== Personal life ==
When Johnson was 18 and living in New York trying to get some success as an actor, he became a full time caregiver for his great aunt. He said it taught him how to be patient and more understanding.

== Filmography ==
=== Film ===
Year	Title	Role	Notes
2013	Product of My Environment [sic?]	Kendu's Friend	
2014	Profilez	Beetle	Short
2014	Dilemma	Jerryd	Short
2014	Remission Accomplished	Dave	Short
2014	The Right Wing	Wilson	Short
2015	The Life of Death	Crash Pedestrians	Short
2016	Act Zero	Mohammed	Short
2017	Smoke Screen	Tim Barnes	
2018	Paterno	Campus Interviewee	
2018	Free Bird	Todd	Short
2018	The Duck	Raymond	Short
2018	#Fashionvictim	Randy	
2019	Killing Time	Lou	Short
2019	Walk of Fame	Zeth	Short
2019	After Class	Eugene Wilkes	
2019	The Sun Is Also a Star	Omar Hassabala	
2019	The Cat and the Moon	Kyle	
2019	Grab My Hand: A Letter to My Dad	Narrator, Jay	Short
2021	Blue Bison	Ax	Short
2021	Volley	Man	Short
2023	Quiz Lady	Trav	
2025	The Witcher: Sirens of the Deep	Agloval	Voice role
2025	The Electric State	Corporal Carson	

=== Television ===
Year	Title	Role	Notes
2015	Unproductive	Theo	11 episodes
2016	The Cobblestone Corridor	Dex Murphy	5 episodes
2016	The OA	Cory	Episode: "Invisible Self"
2016–2018	Luke Cage	Torre	2 episodes
2017	Billions	Bike Messenger	Episode: "Risk Management"
2017	The Breaks	Suspect #2	Episode: "Runaway"
2017	Star	Director	Episode: "Insecure"
2017	There's... Johnny!	Rasheed	4 episodes
2018	Chicago P.D.	Devin Williams	Episode: "True or False"
2019	Cake	Jeff	Episode: "Self Care"
2019	Oh Jerome, No	Jeff	2 episodes
2019–2022	Batwoman	Luke Fox / Batwing	Main role; 51 episodes
2026	One Piece	Mr. 5	Recurring role; 4 episodes

=== Video Games ===
Year	Title	Role	Notes
2024	Suicide Squad: Kill the Justice League	Flynn Russell	Voice
