= Batwoman (TV series) =

2019 American superhero television series

- Title card for the first season
- Genre: Crime; Drama; Mystery; Superhero
- Based on: Batwoman by: Geoff Johns; Grant Morrison; Greg Rucka; Mark Waid; Keith Giffen
- Developed by: Caroline Dries
- Showrunner: Caroline Dries
- Starring: Ruby Rose; Rachel Skarsten; Meagan Tandy; Nicole Kang; Camrus Johnson; Elizabeth Anweis; Dougray Scott; Javicia Leslie; Victoria Cartagena; Robin Givens; Nick Creegan
- Composers: Blake Neely; Sherri Chung
- Country of origin: United States
- Original language: English
- No. of seasons: 3
- No. of episodes: 51 (list of episodes)

Production
- Executive producers: Caroline Dries; Greg Berlanti; Sarah Schechter; Geoff Johns; David Nutter; Marcos Siega; James Stoteraux; Chad Fiveash
- Production locations: Vancouver, British Columbia; Chicago, Illinois
- Camera setup: Single-camera
- Running time: 42–43 minutes
- Production companies: Berlanti Productions; DC Entertainment; Warner Bros. Television

Original release
- Network: The CW
- Release: October 6, 2019 – March 2, 2022

Related
- Arrowverse

Batwoman is an American superhero television series developed by Caroline Dries for The CW. Based on the DC Comics character of the same name, it is part of the Arrowverse television franchise. The series premiered on October 6, 2019, and ran for three seasons until March 2, 2022, before its cancellation on April 29. The first season follows Kate Kane, the cousin of vigilante Bruce Wayne, who becomes Batwoman after his disappearance. The second and third seasons focus on former convict Ryan Wilder as she protects Gotham City in the role of Batwoman.

Development on a Batwoman series began in 2018 after it was announced that Kate would appear in the Arrowverse crossover "Elseworlds". Ruby Rose was cast as Kate the same year, with Batwoman receiving a series order in 2019. Shortly after the conclusion of the first season, Rose exited the series and Javicia Leslie was cast as Ryan, an original character created to succeed Kate. Following the series' cancellation, Leslie reprised her role in the ninth and final season of The Flash.

== Series overview ==
Season	Episodes	Originally released		Rank	Average viewers (in millions)
Season	Episodes	First released	Last released	Rank	Average viewers (in millions)
1	20	October 6, 2019	May 17, 2020	117	1.00
2	18	January 17, 2021	June 27, 2021	147	0.50
3	13	October 13, 2021	March 2, 2022	129	0.46

The series follows Kate Kane and Ryan Wilder overcoming their demons by becoming vigilantes and fighting crime in Gotham City.

In the first season, following the disappearance of Gotham City-based vigilante Batman, (Note: As mentioned in Elseworlds.) Kate discovers that her cousin Bruce Wayne was Batman and decides to follow in his footsteps by becoming her own vigilante using her prior military skills, coined "Batwoman" by the media, with the help of tech-expert and former Wayne Enterprises employee Luke Fox, and her stepsister Mary Hamilton, who eventually discovers Kate is Batwoman. Meanwhile, Kate's father Jacob had formed a security firm known as the Crows during Batman's absence and has come into conflict with the Wonderland Gang, led by the psychotic serial killer Alice all while Batwoman attempts to convince the Crows she is on their side of the war as they won't accept help from masked vigilantes. Kate deduces that Alice is her fraternal twin sister Beth, who was presumed dead following a car accident.

In the second season, following Kate Kane's supposed death from a plane crash, homeless ex-con Ryan Wilder finds the bat-suit from the plane wreckage and takes up the mantle of Batwoman to avenge her mother's death. Meanwhile, Alice explores more of her past which she has mysterious connections with a man named Ocean and a mysterious enemy known as Safiyah Sohail – the woman who had Enigma erase those memories for unknown reasons; In addition, the Crows face up against a new drug dealing organization known as the False Face Society led by Black Mask. Unbeknownst to everyone, Black Mask has Kate hostage after the False Face Society raided her airplane and had Enigma brainwash her to be his daughter Circe Sionis who perished the day when Alice caused a mass breakout at Arkham Asylum. In addition, Black Mask later has Jacob arrested by the police officers on his side for withholding the information that Alice is Beth Kane where Jacob cuts a deal that gets him placed in a prison in Metropolis while "Circe" gains Jacob and Mary's trust in order to steal some items belonging to Batman's enemies. When Alice defeats Black Mask and helps Ryan cure Kate of the Circe persona, she is arrested by the police and remanded to Arkham Asylum with Black Mask. With Kate back to normal, she leaves Gotham to go visit her father and Supergirl before going to look for Bruce. While visiting Alice, Ryan learns that her biological mother is still alive. As for the stolen items that ended up in the river during the conflict, they wash up on shore as a container of one of Poison Ivy's plants breaks open.

In the third and final season, Ryan and Luke begin the hunt for the missing Batman villain trophies like one of Poison Ivy's plants, Mad Hatter's hat, Killer Croc's tooth, and Mr. Freeze's liquid nitrogen where it falls into the hands of different people. Due to some intimidation from former Gotham City Police Department member Renee Montoya, Ryan has no choice but to have Alice as a consultant when looking for the missing trophies. In addition, Ryan finds out that her biological mother is Jeturian Industries' CEO Jada Jet as she also meets her half-brother Marquis, who has a dark past that revolved around a bus that was hijacked by Joker when he was young. Mary gets possessed by Poison Ivy's plant and acts as her proxy. Renee finds Poison Ivy's body and gets her back to her mobile state as she finally meets with Mary's possessed form to get back to full power. After Poison Ivy is defeated and relocated to Coryana with Renee, Batwoman is left to deal with Marquis. Batwoman uses the Joker's joy buzzer to restore Marquis back to normal, while the Joker acid he was going to distribute over Gotham City exploded over a desolate part of the area.

== Cast and characters ==
- Ruby Rose (season 1) and Wallis Day (recurring: season 2) as Katherine "Kate" Kane / Batwoman / Circe Sionis: Bruce Wayne's maternal first cousin who, armed with a passion for social justice and a flair for speaking her mind, dedicates herself to defending Gotham in Batman's absence. Gracyn Shinyei portrays a younger Kate. After going missing in the beginning of the second season when the False Face Society crashes her plane, she is rescued by the Society's leader, who has her surgically altered to resemble his late daughter.
  - Day also portrays the original Circe Sionis in photographs.
- Rachel Skarsten as Elizabeth "Beth" Kane / Alice: Kate's presumed-dead fraternal twin sister and the leader of the Wonderland Gang with an ever-changing personality who sets out to erode Gotham's sense of security. Ava Sleeth portrays a younger Beth.
  - Skarsten also portrayed an alternate version of Beth who was displaced from her native Earth during "Crisis on Infinite Earths" and appeared on Earth-Prime. This version did not get lost during the car accident. She was later killed by August Cartwright, who mistook her for Alice.
- Meagan Tandy as Sophie Moore: A military academy graduate, former high-level Crows agent, and Kate's estranged ex-girlfriend who serves as one of Gotham's protectors. She eventually finds out Kate is the original Batwoman and Wilder is the new one, and becomes an ally.
- Nicole Kang as Mary Hamilton: Kate and Beth's stepsister and a medical student/influencer-in-the-making who makes it her mission to provide aid to those living in Gotham's under-served communities. She eventually discovers Kate is Batwoman and joins her.
- Camrus Johnson as Lucas "Luke" Fox / Batwing: The son of the late Lucius Fox and a staunch Batman loyalist who keeps Wayne Tower secure in Batman's absence. After Kate becomes Batwoman, he comes to understand that Gotham needs a new hero and becomes an ally to her.
  - Johnson also portrays his Earth-99 counterpart, who serves as the retired Batman's personal aide.
- Elizabeth Anweis as Catherine Hamilton-Kane (season 1): Kate's stepmother and one of Gotham's most powerful citizens who made her fortune as a defense contractor and the CEO of Hamilton Dynamics. After Alice poisoned her and Mary, Catherine chose to give Mary the antidote.
- Dougray Scott as Jacob Kane (seasons 1–2): Kate and Beth's father and a former military colonel with a chip on his shoulder who commanded a private security agency, the Crows, in an attempt to protect Gotham more effectively than Batman could. He eventually disbands the Crows in season 2.
- Javicia Leslie as Ryan Wilder / Batwoman (seasons 2–3): A highly skilled yet undisciplined fighter living out of her van with her plant who becomes the new Batwoman after finding the Batsuit in the wreck of the airplane bringing Kate back from National City.
- Victoria Cartagena as Renee Montoya (season 3): A former police officer in the Gotham City Police Department who left when she could no longer stomach its corruption. (Note: Cartagena previously portrayed the character on the Fox series Gotham, but the two shows are not connected since they are in their own continuity.)
- Robin Givens as Jada Jet (season 3): The CEO of Jeturian Industries who is Ryan's biological mother.
- Nick Creegan as Marquis Jet (season 3): The playboy son of Jada Jet, executive vice-president of Jeturian Industries, and half-brother of Ryan.

LaMonica Garrett also stars on "Crisis on Infinite Earths: Part Two" as Mar Novu / Monitor, a multiversal being who tests different Earths in the multiverse in preparation for an impending "crisis" orchestrated by his polar opposite, Mobius / Anti-Monitor.

== Production ==
=== Development ===
In May 2018, The CW president Mark Pedowitz and Arrow lead Stephen Amell announced at The CW's upfront presentation that Batwoman would be introduced in the Arrowverse series' 2018 crossover, "Elseworlds", which aired in December 2018, fighting alongside the other Arrowverse heroes, with Gotham City also appearing. In July 2018, it was reported that The CW was planning to develop a series around the character, to air in 2019 if picked up. The series, said to only be a "script-development deal", was written by Caroline Dries, who would also serve as an executive producer with Greg Berlanti, Sarah Schecter, and the character's co-creator Geoff Johns. The series would be produced by Berlanti Productions and Mad Ghost Productions in association with Warner Bros. Television. The following month, Pedowitz noted the pilot would be completed "for mid-season".

In December 2018, Dries submitted a "strong" script for a potential pilot episode, according to Nellie Andreeva of Deadline Hollywood. That led to the series receiving a pilot order from The CW the next month, to be considered for a series order in the 2019–20 television season. As of April 2019, the series was considered "a lock" at The CW, and reportedly had a writing staff in place. On May 7, 2019, The CW ordered the show to series. On October 25, 2019, the series was picked up for a full season of 22 episodes. On January 7, 2020, the series was renewed for a second season, which premiered on January 17, 2021.

On February 3, 2021, The CW renewed the series for a third season which premiered on October 13, 2021, and the finale aired on March 2, 2022. On April 29, 2022, The CW canceled the series after three seasons.

=== Casting ===
Casting for Kate Kane was expected to begin after the announcement of the intended series in May 2018, with the intention of casting an openly gay actress. In August, Ruby Rose was cast as Kate Kane / Batwoman. In late January 2019, Meagan Tandy, Camrus Johnson and Nicole Kang were cast in the series regular roles as Sophie Moore, Luke Fox and Mary Hamilton, respectively. This was followed shortly by the casting of Rachel Skarsten as Alice, Dougray Scott as Jacob Kane, and Elizabeth Anweis as Catherine Hamilton-Kane.

The casting of Rose as Batwoman was met by backlash on social media and received intense criticism. DC Comics, which owns the rights to the long-time comic book superheroine Batwoman, reintroduced the character in 2006 as a gay Jewish woman. Some online reactions attacked Rose for not being Jewish, while the main focus of the criticism was the assertion that the fact that she considers herself gender-fluid made her "not gay enough." Rose left Twitter and deactivated public commenting on her Instagram account following the backlash.

In July 2021, Robin Givens, Victoria Cartagena and Nick Creegan were cast as new series regulars for the third season. In August 2021, Bridget Regan was cast in the recurring role of Poison Ivy for the third season.

==== Rose's departure and recasting of Batwoman ====
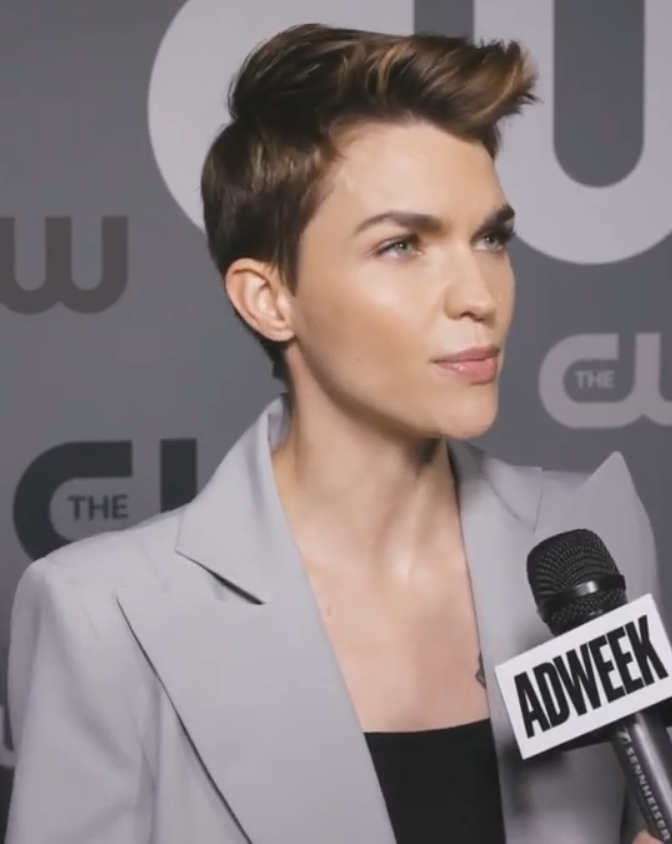
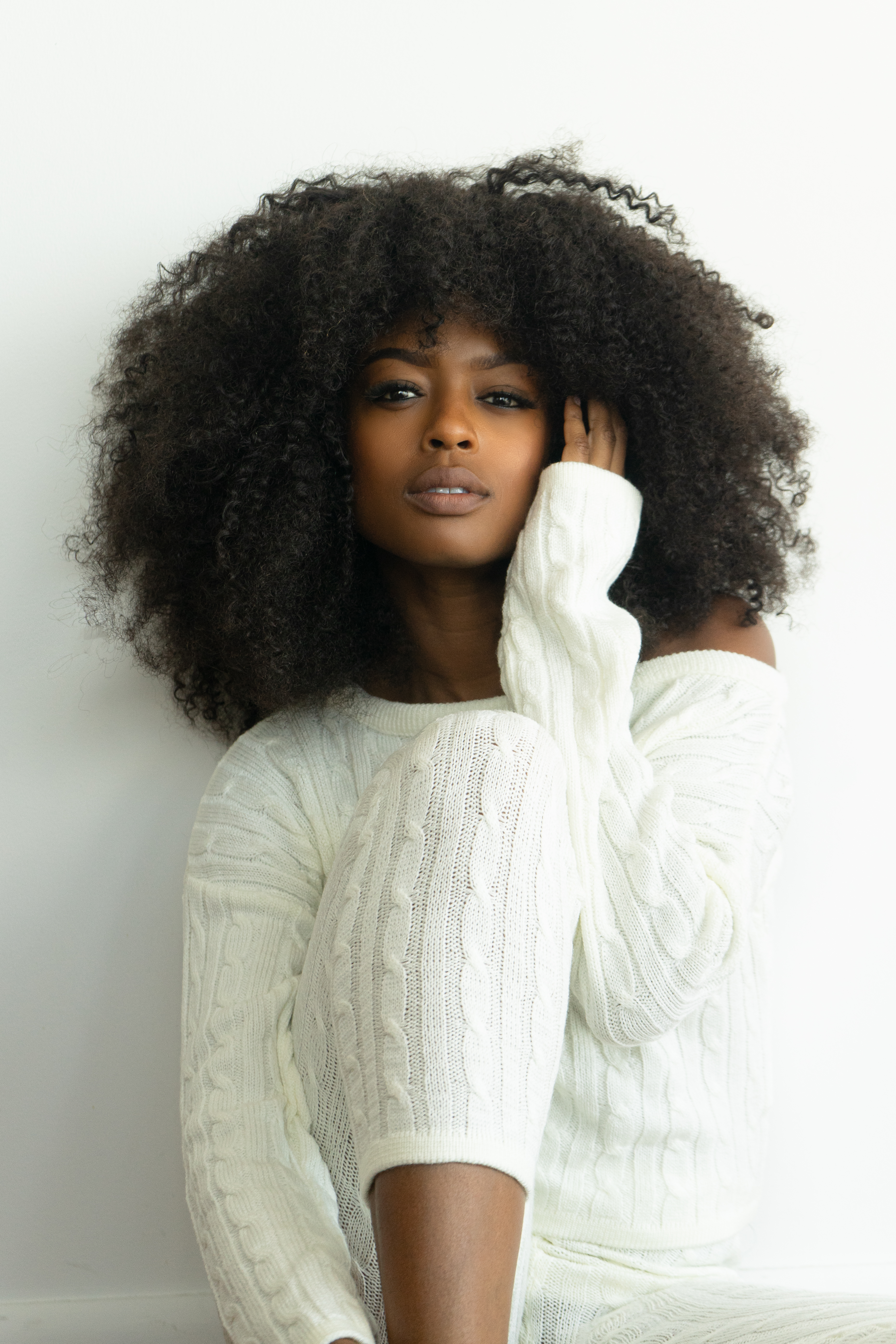
Following the departure of series lead Ruby Rose (left), Javicia Leslie (right) was cast as a new Batwoman for the second season.

In May 2020, Rose announced she would be leaving the series ahead of its second season; while it was initially announced that it was mutually decided between Rose, the studio, and the network for her to leave, Rose's Batwoman co-star Camrus Johnson confirmed in October 2021 that Rose had in fact been fired after "multiple complaints" about her on-set behavior. The producers reaffirmed their commitment to the series and finding a new actress who is gay to lead future seasons. Rose later called being the lead of a series "taxing" and stated her back surgery following an on-set accident in 2019 was a contributing factor in deciding to leave, saying it was "time for me to take a break to fully heal and then return" to acting. Spending time in isolation because of the COVID-19 pandemic also allowed Rose "to just think about a lot of different things and what you want to achieve in life and what you want to do," which allowed her "a great opportunity to have a dialogue about a lot of things" with the producers.

The following month, a casting notice for a new character named Ryan Wilder was revealed, indicating the series was looking to replace Kane as Batwoman. Dries defended the decision to introduce a new character as Batwoman, asserting that the series would continue to "respect everything that Ruby put into the Kate Kane character." She also revealed Kane would not be killed, and her disappearance would be a key story-line during season two.

Matt Webb Mitovitch at TVLine and Jill Pantozzi of io9 both felt replacing Kane as Batwoman would be a detriment to the series. Mitovitch felt it would "create more problems than it solves", saying it would take away from the established character dynamics (namely the "central" one between Kate and Alice) and the various plot threads waiting to be resolved from the end of the first season. He added: "a simple if momentarily awkward recast would have kept all established storylines and dynamics intact; Season 2 could then pick up where the solid Season 1 left off. Instead, loyal viewers will be asked to re-invest in something that is significantly new, while also possibly giving up some of the things they liked most about the show." Pantozzi felt the series could have approached the casting of a new lead actress more creatively, given the series exists in "a universe of time travel, doppelgängers, and literal face-swapping". She concluded, "if they are truly doing away with the Kate character it feels like a bizarre move. Fans could much easier come to terms with a simple replacement actress, than having to go through a convoluted story of why a random lesbian has taken up the cowl so soon after Kate did. ... It seems like a lot of explaining to do when there's a much easier option." Conversely, Collider's Liz Shannon Miller felt a new character was "the right call" and "a big swing" for the series. Miller pointed to the "long-established precedent" in the comics of new characters taking over mantles from others. Like Mitovitch, Miller questioned what the new character would mean for the series' supporting cast, since their connections to Kate were "their primary reason for being a part of the show's storyline". She also hoped "Ryan Wilder" was a place-holder name, "because the trend of naming strong female characters with traditionally male names has just gotten tired at this point".

In early July 2020, Javicia Leslie was cast as Ryan Wilder, the new Batwoman. Rose was supportive of Leslie's casting. Wallis Day was later cast as Kate Kane where it was claimed that she surgically altered her appearance. Rose, commenting on an Instagram tribute to her time in the role, stated that she was "stoked" about Day's casting.

In an interview with ComicBookMovie.com when asked if she would reprise Kate at some point, Rose said, "I would totally do it. I don't think it would serve the story because I think building the new Batwoman is more important than going back too far into Kate Kane, but of course I would." Then she added on "I've watched a couple of episodes, and I think how they're handling it is beautiful. I think it's [Ryan Wilder's] time to shine." However, in later in October 2021, after Rose spoke out about alleged abuse and neglect on set, she walked back on the statement, saying she would not return for "any amount of money nor if there were a gun to my head".

=== Filming ===
Production on the pilot episode began on March 4 and concluded on March 25, 2019, in Vancouver, British Columbia. Additional filming took place in Chicago, Illinois. Filming for the rest of the season began on July 4 and was set to conclude in mid-2020. On March 12, 2020, Warner Bros. Television shut down production on the series due to the COVID-19 pandemic. Filming for the second season began on September 3, 2020, and concluded on May 10, 2021. Filming for the third season began on July 19, 2021, and concluded on December 22.

=== Controversy ===
In 2019, Rose suffered an injury during stunt work on the series. She spoke about the experience being close to "severing my spinal chord (sic). I was in chronic pain and yet couldn't feel my arms". She required emergency surgery. In 2020, Amanda Smith, a production assistant working on the show, was paralyzed following a bucket lift being lowered onto her head. Warner Bros. Television stated they cooperated with an investigation into onset safety.

In October 2021, Rose spoke out on the working conditions of her time on Batwoman. She alleged that after her spine injury, she was forced back to work with the implications from studio executives being that the entire crew would lose their jobs if she did not. She also stated that production was rushed and corners cut during the COVID-19 pandemic and that there were many stuntpersons' injuries on-set as well as her own, including one which she said cast and crew should have received therapy for afterward. Rose spoke out against co-stars Dougray Scott and Camrus Johnson's behavior on-set, calling the former abusive and the latter an "egomaniac kid who worked one day a week". Scott responded that these allegations are "entirely made-up", while Johnson stated Rose was fired and he felt "we have a lot of great souls working on this show".

In a statement, Warner Bros. Television dismissed the allegations by Rose and said that her contract was not picked up for season two because of multiple complaints about her workplace behavior. This was expanded on when a production assistant, Alexander J. Baxter, came forward to confirm Rose had been fired from the show for alleged "dictator"-like behaviour. However, Rose disputed these claims and produced emails, texts and other evidence on her concerns with the working conditions and ethics on set.

== Release ==
=== Broadcast ===
The series debuted on The CW October 6, 2019. In New Zealand, the series is streamed on TVNZ's free streaming service TVNZ OnDemand. In the United Kingdom, the series is shown on E4. In Canada, it is aired on Showcase.

=== Home media ===
Season 1 was released on DVD and Blu-ray on August 18, 2020. Special features included deleted scenes, a gag reel, highlights from DCTV's 2019 San Diego Comic-Con panels, and a behind-the-scenes featurette entitled "On the Set". The release also included a bonus disc with all five episodes of the "Crisis on Infinite Earths" crossover event.

Season 2 was released on DVD and Blu-ray on September 21, 2021. Special features included deleted scenes, a gag reel, and two featurettes entitled "Villains Analyzed" and "Never Alone: Heroes and Allies".

Season 3 was released on Blu-ray & DVD on July 12, 2022. Special features included deleted scenes and a gag reel.

== Reception ==
=== Ratings ===
Viewership and ratings per season of Batwoman
Season	Timeslot (ET)	Episodes	First aired		Last aired		TV season	Viewership rank	Avg. viewers (millions)	18–49 rank	Avg. 18–49 rating
Season	Timeslot (ET)	Episodes	Date	Viewers (millions)	Date	Viewers (millions)	TV season	Viewership rank	Avg. viewers (millions)	18–49 rank	Avg. 18–49 rating
1	Sunday 8:00 pm	20	October 6, 2019	1.86	May 17, 2020	0.74	2019–20	117	1.0	113	0.5
2	Sunday 8:00 pm (1–11); Sunday 9:00 pm (12–18)	18	January 17, 2021	0.66	June 27, 2021	0.41	2020–21	147	0.50	141	0.2
3	Wednesday 9:00 pm	13	October 13, 2021	0.47	March 2, 2022	0.42	2021–22	129	0.47	117	0.2

=== Critical response ===
On Rotten Tomatoes, the series' first season holds an approval rating of 80% based on 236 reviews from critics, with an average rating of 6.85/10. The site's critical consensus reads, "Though it needs more time to develop its own identity to truly soar, Batwoman's fun and stylish first season is a step in the right direction for representation and superhero shows alike." On Metacritic, the first season has a weighted average score of 59 out of 100 based on reviews from 16 critics, indicating "mixed or average reviews".

On Rotten Tomatoes, the second season has an approval rating of 86% based on 21 reviews, with an average rating of 6.80/10. The critical consensus for the season reads, "Batwoman's second season survives a soft reboot, maintaining the show's excellence while giving Javicia Leslie plenty of room to spread her wings."

=== Accolades ===
Year	Award	Category	Nominee(s)	Result	Ref.
2020	GLAAD Media Awards	Outstanding Drama Series	Batwoman	Nominated	
2020	Queerty Awards	TV Series	Batwoman	Nominated	
2020	Queerty Awards	TV Performance	Ruby Rose	Nominated	
2020	Leo Awards	Best Cinematography in a Dramatic Series		Nominated	
2020	Leo Awards	Best Costume Design in a Dramatic Series		Nominated	
2020	CAFTCAD Awards	Best Costume Design in TV Sci-Fi/ Fantasy		Nominated	
2020	UBCP/ACTRA Awards	Best Stunt Performance		Nominated	
2020	Autostraddle Gay Emmys	Outstanding Sci-Fi/Fantasy Series	Batwoman	Runner-up	
2020	Autostraddle Gay Emmys	Outstanding Supporting Actor Playing an LGBTQ+ Character in a Sci-Fi/Fantasy Series	Meagan Tandy	Nominated	
2020	Autostraddle Gay Emmys	Outstanding Guest Actor Playing an LGBTQ+ Character in a Sci-Fi/Fantasy Series	Christina Wolfe	Runner-up	
2020	Autostraddle Gay Emmys	Outstanding Guest Actor Playing an LGBTQ+ Character in a Sci-Fi/Fantasy Series	Brianne Howey	Nominated	
2020	Autostraddle Gay Emmys	Outstanding Performance by an LGBTQ+ Actor in a Sci-Fi/Fantasy Show	Ruby Rose	Nominated	
2020	Autostraddle Gay Emmys	Most Groundbreaking Representation (Show)	Batwoman	Runner-up	
2021	TVLine Performer of the Week		Javicia Leslie	Won	
2021	Saturn Awards	Best Superhero Adaptation Television Series	Batwoman	Nominated	
2021	Autostraddle Gay Emmys	Outstanding Sci-Fi/Fantasy Series	Batwoman	Won	
2021	Autostraddle Gay Emmys	Outstanding Lead Actor Playing an LGBTQ+ Character in a Sci-Fi Series	Javicia Leslie	Won	
2021	Autostraddle Gay Emmys	Outstanding Supporting or Guest Actor Playing an LGBTQ+ Character in a Sci-Fi Series	Meagan Tandy	Won	
2021	Autostraddle Gay Emmys	Outstanding LGBTQ+ Actor in a Sci-Fi/Fantasy Show	Javicia Leslie	Won	
2021	Autostraddle Gay Emmys	Outstanding Hairstyling for an LGBTQ+ Character	Sophie Moore	Runner-up	
2021	Autostraddle Gay Emmys	Outstanding Costume Design for a Show With LGBTQ+ Characters	Batwoman	Nominated	
2022	GLAAD Media Awards	Outstanding Drama Series	Batwoman	Nominated	
2022	Critics' Choice Super Awards	Best Actress in a Superhero Series	Javicia Leslie	Nominated	
