= Meagan Tandy =

American actress and model (born 1985)

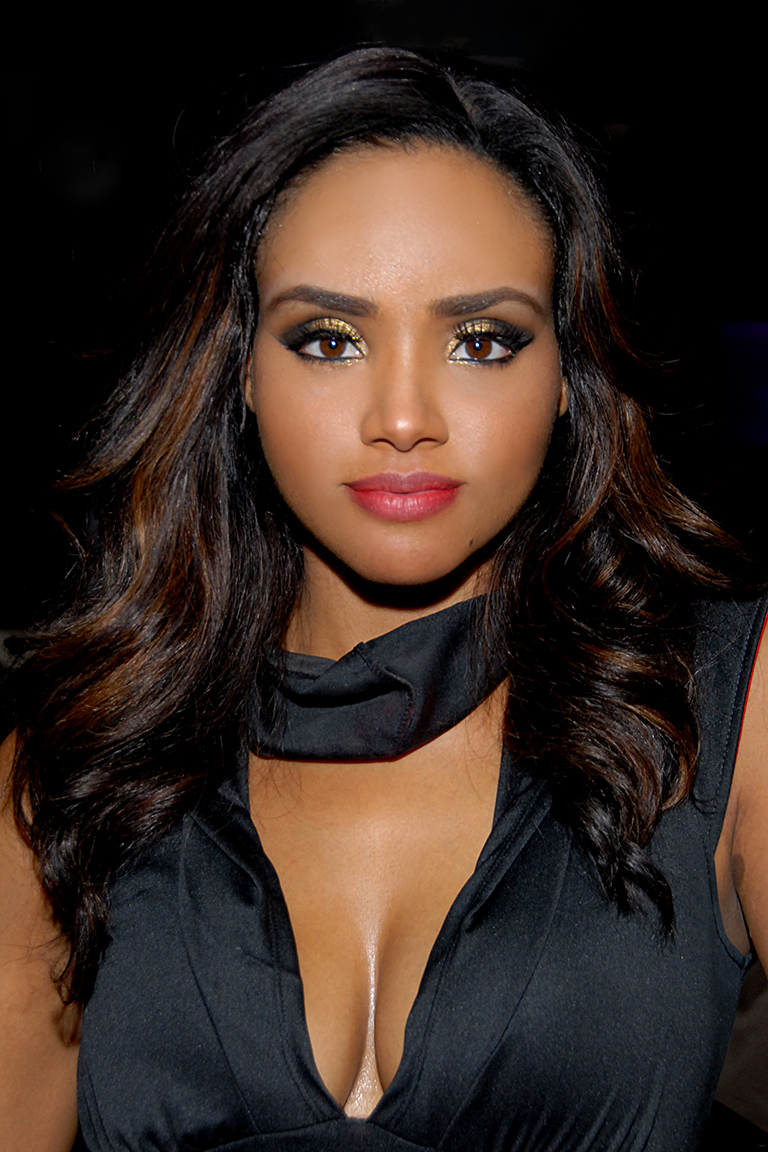
- Meagan Tandy, Beverly Hills, California on October 30, 2015
- Born: Meagan Yvonne Tandy; May 3, 1985 (age 41); Fremont, California, U.S.
- Occupations: Actress; model; beauty pageant titleholder
- Height: 5 ft 8 in (1.73 m)
- Spouse: Branden Wellington (m. 2024)
- Children: 1
- Beauty pageant titleholder
- Title: Miss California USA 2007
- Years active: 2007−present
- Hair color: Brown
- Eye color: Brown
- Major competitions: Miss California USA 2007 (Winner); Miss USA 2007 (3rd Runner-Up)

Meagan Yvonne Tandy (born May 3, 1985) is an American actress and model. She is a former Miss California USA who placed as third runner-up at Miss USA 2007. As an actress, she had long running roles in Jane by Design, Teen Wolf, Survivor's Remorse, and recently starred as Sophie Moore on The CW's Batwoman.

== Early life and pageant career ==
Tandy, born in Fremont, California and raised in Fontana, graduated from Etiwanda High School in Rancho Cucamonga. She was a student at Chaffey College, and she is the first student from this school to win the Miss California USA title.

Tandy studied business and film production at Chaffey College for two years where she had to produce, create and edit several commercials and short film projects for the class. While there, Tandy landed a job as a stand-in for December 2003 wedding of "Trista and Ryan", from Season 1 of The Bachelorette. Although a fan of the show, Tandy said being a stand-in for the Live wedding was a "terrible" experience, and she has never worked as a stand-in since. After receiving associate degrees at Chaffey, Tandy attended Cal Poly Pomona where she worked on a degree in business management and marketing.

Tandy won the Miss California USA title in a state pageant held in San Rafael, California on October 15, 2006. It was her second attempt at the title, as she had placed fourth runner-up to Tamiko Nash the previous year. Tandy also won the Best Swimsuit Award in the 2007 Miss California USA pageant.

Tandy competed in the Miss USA 2007 pageant, placing 3rd runner-up. Her evening wear gown was created by Nick Verreos, a participant on Season 2 of Project Runway. She was only the fourth African-American Miss California USA and the first African-American to succeed another African-American titleholder.

== Entertainment career ==
Tandy is a member of the Screen Actors Guild. She filmed several television commercials for national campaigns, including Wendy's, Boost Mobile and a Super Bowl commercial for Pepsi Max. Tandy appeared in a movie promotion for the 2007 film Shrek the Third. Tandy's break through film role came in the 2010 movie Unstoppable, briefly appearing as a curvaceous Hooters waitress and daughter of Denzel Washington's lead character.

She temporarily hosted as an online correspondent for E! News.

In May 2012, Tandy founded her own program for teens called "GIRL TALK" where she collaborated with the Women On The Move Network of Rancho Cucamonga. The 1st Annual "GIRL TALK" seminar was held in July 2013.

Tandy currently resides in Los Angeles where she continues her acting career. She played Lulu Pope on the ABC Family show Jane By Design. Tandy appeared in Piranha 3DD, where she played Ashley Sorby, who meets a gruesome demise. Tandy also appeared in Trey Songz music video single called Simply Amazing from his new album Chapter V.

In June 2013, she made her debut onto the MTV supernatural drama series Teen Wolf where she played the recurring and fan-favorite role of Braeden for 3 seasons.

In 2014, she played Sabrina on the teen medical dramedy series Red Band Society, cancelled after 10 episodes. In 2015, she joined the cast of the sitcom Survivor's Remorse, playing the recurring role of Allison Pierce, for the second through fourth seasons. In 2016, Tandy played Chantal for the second season of the dramedy television series UnREAL. From 2019 to 2022, she was a regular on The CW's Batwoman as Sophie Moore.

== Personal life ==
Tandy met actor Branden Wellington from television show Sistas and they started dating in 2018. On January 11, 2024, Tandy announced that she got engaged to Wellington. On September 5, they married. On December 11, 2025, Tandy announced they were expecting a son. On February 28, 2026, the couple announced that their son was born in January.

== Filmography ==
=== Film ===
Year	Title	Role	Notes
2010	Unstoppable	Maya Barnes	
2012	Piranha 3DD	Ashley Sorby	
2013	Beverly Hills Cop	Renee	
2019	The Trap	Sasha	
2019	Always a Bridesmaid	Marissa	
2022	Stalked Within	Sarah	
2025	Tyler Perry’s Duplicity	Fela	

=== Television ===
Year	Title	Role	Notes
2009	CSI: NY	Model #1	Episode: "Yahrzeit"
2009	90210	Savanna	Episode: "One Party Can Ruin Your Whole Summer"
2009	Secret Girlfriend	-	Episode: "You Learn to Appreciate Life"
2010	10 Things I Hate About You	Erin	Episode: "Changes"
2010	Dark Blue	Rita	Episode: "Urban Garden" & "Liar's Poker"
2011	CSI: Miami	Cynthia	Episode: "Last Stand"
2011	Zeke and Luther	Tasha	Episode: "Skater Girl Island"
2011	Single Ladies	Tonya	Episode: "Take Me to the Next Phase"
2012	Jane by Design	Lulu Pope	Main cast
2013	Baby Daddy	Vanessa	Episode: "All's Flair in Love and War"
2013	Necessary Roughness	Hannah Stokes	Episode: "The Game's Afoot"
2013–16	Teen Wolf	Braeden	Recurring cast: season 3–5
2014	Stalker	Annie	Episode: "The Haunting"
2014	NCIS: Los Angeles	Sierra Fisher	Episode: "Leipei"
2014	Red Band Society	Sabrina	Episode: "Know Thyself"
2015–17	Survivor's Remorse	Allison Pierce	Recurring cast: season 2-4
2016	UnREAL	Chantal	Main cast: season 2
2017	The Mayor	Danielle	Episode: "Will You Accept this Rose?"
2017	9JKL	Toni	Episode: "The Family Plot"
2018	Charmed	Summer	Episode: "Other Women" & "Kappa Spirit"
2019–22	Batwoman	Sophie Moore	Main cast

=== Music videos ===
Year	Title	Role	Artist
2012	"Simply Amazing"	Lead Girl	Trey Songz

Preceded by Tamiko Nash	Miss California USA; 2007	Succeeded by Raquel Beezley
