= Rachel Skarsten =

Canadian actress

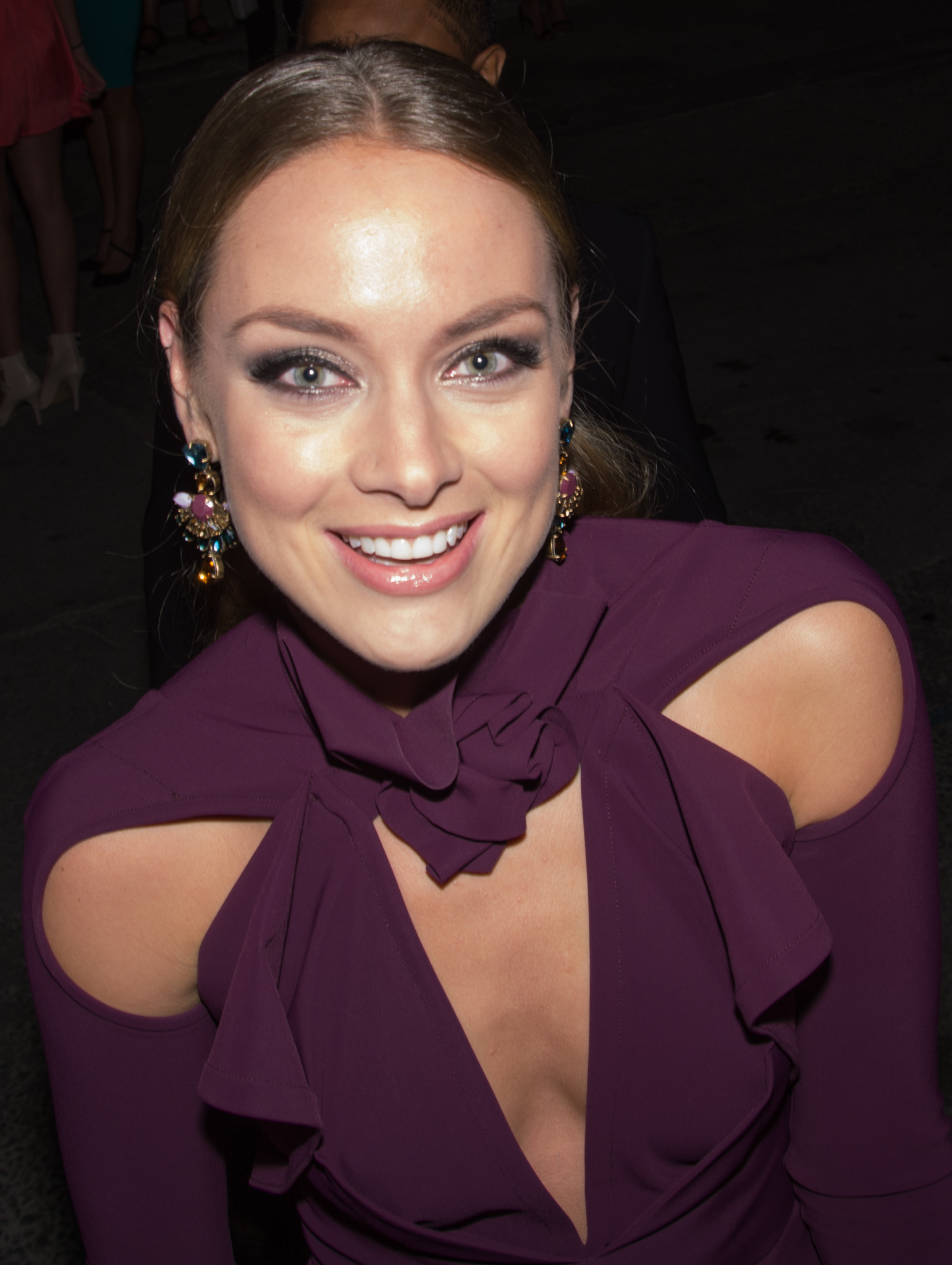
- Skarsten in 2014
- Born: April 23, 1985 (age 41); Toronto, Ontario, Canada
- Education: Queen's University
- Occupation: Actress
- Years active: 1998–present
- Spouse: Alexandre Robicquet (m. 2020)
- Children: 1
- Website: www.rachelskarsten.com

Rachel Skarsten (born 23 April 1985) is a Canadian actress. Her television roles include Dinah Lance in Birds of Prey (2002–2003), Tamsin in Lost Girl (2013–2015), Queen Elizabeth I in Reign (2014–2017) and Beth Kane / Alice in Batwoman (2019–2022). Her film credits include Fifty Shades of Grey, Molly's Game, and Acquainted.

== Early life ==
Skarsten was born in Toronto, Ontario. Her father Dr. Stan Skarsten was from Bergen, Norway, while her mother, Mary Aileen Self Skarsten, grew up in India. Skarsten grew up in northern Toronto, and spent time in Norway during her youth.

Skarsten trained with the Royal Academy of Dance for 12 years,before an ankle injury led her to stop pursuing dance. She later played hockey as a goaltender. In 2002 she played goalie for the Toronto Leaside Wildcats.

She attended Claude Watson School for the Arts from grades 4 to 8, majoring in visual arts and the cello. She continued in the Claude Watson Arts Program at Earl Haig Secondary School from grades 9–12, majoring in visual arts. She was discovered by an agent at a memorial for her father.

== Acting career ==
Skarsten began acting as a child and appeared as a series regular in the television series 'Little Men'. She later played Dinah Lance in the WB television series 'Birds of Prey'. After the series ended, she returned to Canada and attended Queen's University, graduating in 2007 with a degree in English.

After returning to acting, Skarsten appeared in television series including 'Flashpoint', 'The L.A. Complex', 'The Listener', and 'Beauty and the Beast', and in films including 'The Vow' and 'Fifty Shades of Grey'.

In 2013, Skarsten joined the Canadian supernatural drama series 'Lost Girl' as Tamsin. She later joined 'Reign' as Queen Elizabeth I, appearing as a series regular during the show's third season.

In 2019, Skarsten was cast as Alice, also known as Elizabeth Kane, in the CW superhero series Batwoman.

== Personal life ==
Skarsten married a founder and Al researcher named Alexandre Robicquet in May 12, 2020. In September 6, 2023, Skarsten announced that she was pregnant with their first child. Their son was born in late 2023.

== Filmography ==
=== Film ===
Year	Title	Role	Notes
2002	Virginia's Run	Caroline Lofton	
2003	Fear of the Dark	Heather Fontaine	
2007	Jack Brooks: Monster Slayer	Eve	
2007	American Pie Presents Beta House	Sharon	Direct-to-video film
2011	Servitude	Alex	
2012	Two Hands to Mouth	Leah Whitefield	
2012	The Vow	Rose	
2015	Fifty Shades of Grey	Andrea	
2017	Molly's Game	Leah	
2018	Acquainted	Claire	
2023	Going In	—N/a	Associate producer

The following list includes selected film and television credits.

=== Television ===
Year	Title	Role	Notes
1998	The Famous Jett Jackson	Mickey Twitty	Episode: "Vootle-Muck-a-Heey"
1998–1999	Little Men	Elizabeth "Bess" Lawrence	Main role
1999	Justice	Actress	Television film
2000	Angels in the Infield	Brigitte	Television film
2000	Twice in a Lifetime	Julie Adams	Episode: "Curveball"
2001	Jewel	Raylene Hilburn (age 14)	Television film
2001	Screech Owls	Suki Sutherland	Episode: "A Star Is Gone"
2002	POV Sports on CBC	Herself	Host: Science of Sports
2002	Tracker	Jamie Swenson / Lontoria	Episode: "The Miracle"
2002–2003	Birds of Prey	Dinah Lance	Main role
2003	Missing	Brittney Moore	Episode: "Basic Training"
2005	Category 7: The End of the World	Lyra Duffy	Miniseries
2010	Made... The Movie	Andi	Television film
2011	Awakening	Leila	Television film
2011	Flashpoint	Natalie Braddock	4 episodes
2011–2012	The Listener	Elyse	3 episodes
2012	The L.A. Complex	Roxanne	3 episodes
2012	Transporter: The Series	Delia	Episode: "The General's Daughter"
2012	Beauty & the Beast	Brooke	Episodes: "Worth" and "Bridesmaid Up!"
2013–2015	Lost Girl	Tamsin	Recurring role
2013	Lost Girl: An Evening at the Clubhouse	Herself	Television film
2014	In My Dreams	Jessa	Television film (Hallmark)
2015–2017	Reign	Elizabeth I	Guest role (season 2); main role (seasons 3–4)
2015	The Red Dress	Patricia	Television film
2017	Wynonna Earp	Eliza Shapiro	Episode: "Steel Bars and Stone Walls"
2017	Marry Me at Christmas	Madeline Krug	Television film (Hallmark)
2018	Imposters	Poppy Langmore	Recurring role (season 2)
2019	Timeless Love	Megan	Television film (Hallmark)
2019–2022	Batwoman	Beth Kane / Alice	Main role
2020	Nurses	Lily Dawson	Episode: "Lady Business"
2022	The Royal Nanny	Claire Champion	Television film (Hallmark)
2023	Christmas Island	Captain Kate Gabriel	Television film (Hallmark)
2024	Jazz Ramsey: A K-9 Mystery	Jazz Ramsey	Television film (Hallmark)
2024	The Christmas Charade	Whitney	Television film (Hallmark)
