= Caroline Dries =

American television producer and writer

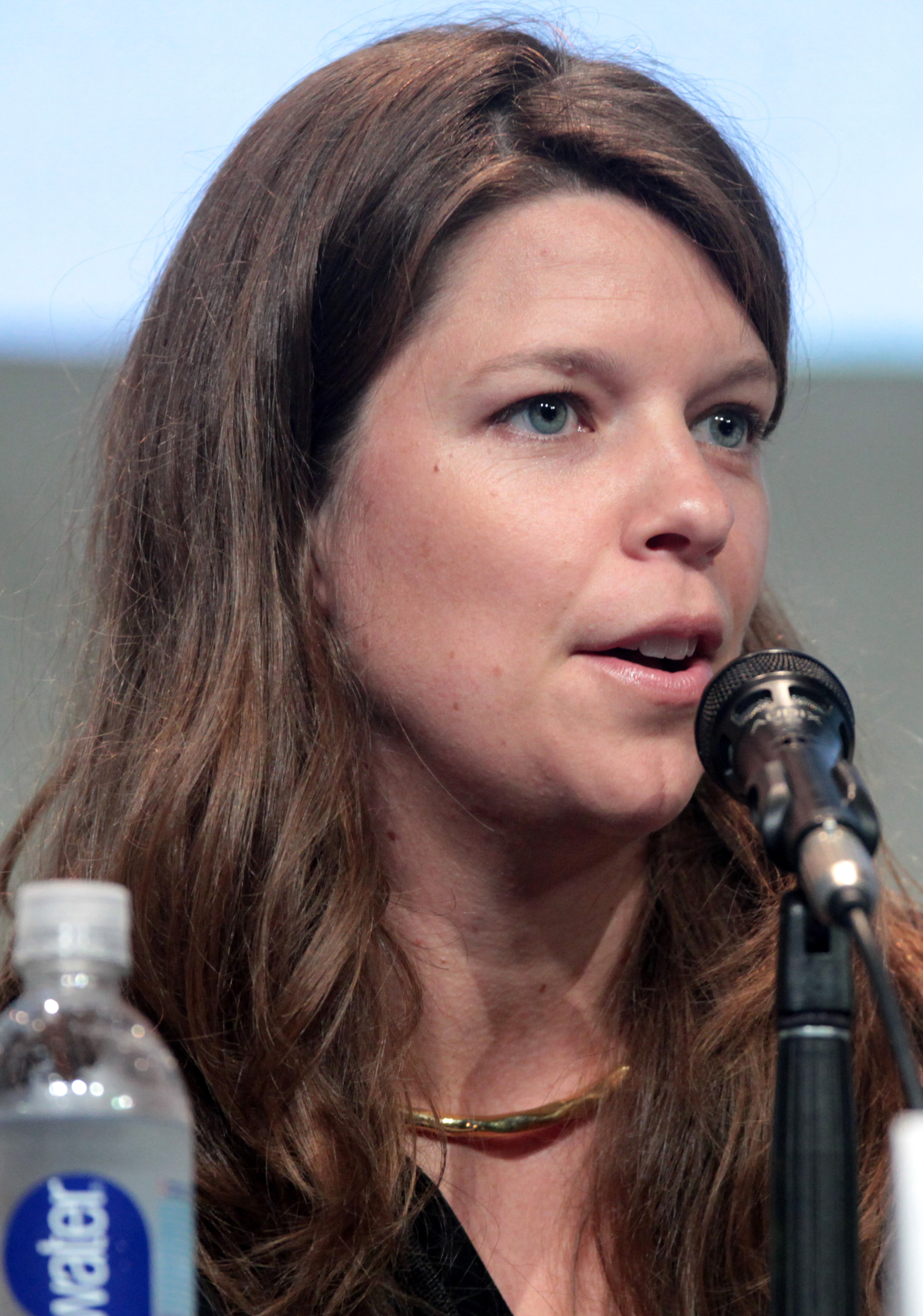
- Dries in 2015
- Born: Milwaukee, Wisconsin, U.S.
- Occupations: Television writer; producer
- Years active: 2006–present
- Spouse: Danielle Maynard

Caroline Dries is an American television writer and a producer who has worked as a writer on three series for The CW; Smallville, Melrose Place and served as an executive producer on The Vampire Diaries. She wrote and developed the TV series Batwoman. She is also known for the footage she captured of the 9/11 terrorist attacks on the World Trade Center from her New York City apartment while a student at NYU.

== Television work ==
=== Smallville ===
- "Cyborg" (5.15)
- "Oracle" (5.21)
- "Subterranean" (6.09)
- "Nemesis" (6.19)
- "Action" (7.05)
- "Gemini" (7.09)
- "Fracture" (7.12)
- "Sleeper" (7.17)
- "Toxic" (8.03)
- "Bloodline" (8.08)
- "Infamous" (8.15)
- "Stiletto" (8.19)

=== Melrose Place ===
- "Grand" (1.03)
- "Cahuenga" (1.10)
- "Stoner Canyon" (1.14) (with Caprice Crane)
- "Sepulveda" (1.17)

=== The Vampire Diaries ===
- "Miss Mystic Falls" (1.19) (with Bryan Oh)
- "Isobel" (1.21) (with Brian Young)
- "Memory Lane" (2.04)
- "The Sacrifice" (2.10)
- "The House Guest" (2.16)
- "The Sun Also Rises" (2.21) (with Mike Daniels)
- "The End of the Affair" (3.03)
- "Smells Like Teen Spirit" (3.06) (with Julie Plec)
- "Ordinary People" (3.08) (with Julie Plec)
- "Dangerous Liaisons" (3.14)
- "The Murder Of One" (3.18)
- "Before Sunset" (3.21)
- "Growing Pains" (4.01)
- "My Brother's Keeper" (4.07) (with Elisabeth R. Finch)
- "Into the Wild" (4.13)
- "Pictures of You" (4.19) (with Neil Reynolds)
- "The Walking Dead" (4.22) (with Brian Young)
- "Graduation" (4.23) (with Julie Plec)
- "I Know What You Did Last Summer" (5.01)
- "Handle with Care" (5.06) (with Holly Brix)
- "Fifty Shades of Grayson" (5.10)
- "500 Years of Solitude" (5.11) (with Julie Plec)
- "While You Were Sleeping" (5.16)
- "Resident Evil" (5.18) (with Brian Young)
- "Home" (5.22) (with Brian Young)
- "I'll Remember" (6.01)
- "Christmas Through Your Eyes" (6.10)
- "Stay" (6.14) (with Brian Young)
- "The Downward Spiral" (6.16) (with Brian Young)
- "I'm Thinking of You All the While" (6.22) (with Julie Plec)
- "Day One of Twenty-Two Thousand, Give or Take" (7.01)
- "Best Served Cold" (7.06)

=== Arrow ===
- "Elseworlds, Part 2" (7.09) (story only)

=== Batwoman ===
- "Pilot" (1.01)
- "The Rabbit Hole" (1.02)
- "Tell Me the Truth" (1.07) (with Natalie Abrams)
- "How Queer is Everything Today!" (1.10)
- "Whatever Happened to Kate Kane?" (2.01)
- "Do Not Resucitate" (2.06) (with Daphne Miles)
- "I'll Give You a Clue" (2.13) (with Natalie Abrams)
- "Power" (2.18)
- "Mad as a Hatter" (3.01)
- "A Lesson from Professor Pyg" (3.05)
- "Meet Your Maker" (3.09)
- "We Having Fun Yet" (3.13)

=== Gotham Knights ===
- "Daddy Issues" (1.11) (with Natalie Abrams)

=== Elle ===
- "You Picked The Wrong Girl" (1.07)

== September 11, 2001 experience ==
At 08:46 on 9/11, Dries and her roommate Megan were sleeping in at their New York University dormitory. They were awakened when American Airlines Flight 11 hit the North Tower. Dries began videotaping the crash scene with a camcorder she got about a week prior, while other dorm members came into the room. About fifteen minutes later, while zooming in on people jumping out of the building (which she thought was debris, specifically mentioning chairs in the tape), the South Tower was hit; Megan began screaming while Dries said "Oh my God!" repeatedly and questioning what to do when they realized it was a deliberate attack. Due to the camera initially being on the North Tower, she did not capture the actual collision. Horrified, Megan began packing a few belongings in an attempt to flee the scene, with Dries following. When they got out of the building, they noticed that everyone else was equally confused. With no leads and not feeling safe, they went back to their dorm and watched the scene with their friends. As they were about to drink apple juice mixed with vodka, Megan (while the camera was on her) looked back at the tower and screamed again; Dries turned the camera back to show the South Tower collapsing. Everyone continued to remain in the room until after the North Tower collapsed.

Dries' footage was used in the 2008 History Channel documentary 102 Minutes That Changed America.
