= Joseph Bennett =

Joseph Bennett may refer to:

- Joseph Bennett (actor) (1894–1931), American actor
- Joseph Bennett (billiards player) (1842–1905), English champion player of English billiards
- Joseph Bennett (British politician) (1829–1908), English merchant and Liberal Party politician
- Joseph Bennett (cricketer, born 1835) (1835–1879), New Zealand cricketer
- Joseph Bennett (cricketer, born 1881) (1881–1947), New Zealand cricketer
- Joseph Bennett (critic) (1831–1911), English music critic and librettist
- Joseph Bennett (footballer), English footballer
- Joseph Bennett (Victoria cricketer), Australian cricketer
- Joseph A. Bennett (1968–2015), English actor
- Joseph B. Bennett (1859–1923), U.S. congressman
- Joseph Bray Bennett (1833–1913), English American politician in Wisconsin
- Joseph L. Bennett (died 1848), Texas legislator, Lt. Colonel (Battle of San Jacinto)

== See also ==
- Joe Bennett (disambiguation)
- Joseph Bennet (1629–1707), English minister and theologian
- Josephine Bennett (1880–1961), American suffragist and activist
