= Batwoman: Elegy =

Comic book storyline

"Elegy"
- Cover art for the hardcover collection of Batwoman: Elegy. Art by J.H. Williams III.
- Publisher: DC Comics
- Publication date: August 2009 – February 2010
- Genre: Superhero
- Title(s): Detective Comics #854-863
- Main character(s): Kate Kane/Batwoman; Colonel Jacob Kane; Alice; Kyle Abbot

Creative team
- Writer: Greg Rucka
- Penciller: J.H. Williams III
- Letterer: Todd Klein
- Colorist: Dave Stewart
- Editor: Michael Siglain

Elegy is a 2009-2010 comic book story arc that ran in the main feature of DC Comics' flagship title, Detective Comics, from issues #854-860. It is written by Greg Rucka with artwork by J.H. Williams III, with colors by Dave Stewart and lettering by Todd Klein.

The story is notable for featuring the modern incarnation of Batwoman, replacing Detective's regular feature character Batman in the wake of his apparent death in the DC event series Final Crisis. Although a title had been in the planning stages since before the character's first appearance in 52, various production setbacks and DC events delayed the title until Bruce Wayne's removal from the present day DC Universe. Deemed the appropriate time, the story was placed as the main feature in Detective.

== Publication history ==
According to series writer Greg Rucka, DC Comics had intended to do either a Batwoman ongoing or mini-series prior to the release of the year-long 52. On May 28, 2006, weeks after the debut of 52, The New York Times published an article "Straight (and Not) Out of the Comics," which examined DC Comic's latest effort "to introduce heroes who are not cut from the usual straight white male supercloth." A key part of that effort, reported journalist George Gene Gustines, was "Batwoman, a lesbian socialite by night and a crime fighter by later in the night."

By 52's conclusion, DC made it clear to the talent involved that the character should appear in her own book at some point. Rucka ended up landing the writing assignment, having written most of the Batwoman material in 52. Around the time of the One Year Later event, the then-editor on the Batman titles, Peter Tomasi, first said that artist J.H. Williams III and Rucka would be the best team to take on the title. After Tomasi left his position as editor, Williams and Rucka began seriously discussing where to take the story. Rucka said that he "had been doing a whole lot of pre-work on it, writing up a concept bible and things like that. Jim sat down and looked at the designs that had already been done in her prior appearances, brought up some of his design and aesthetic concerns, and then went on to do redesigns. At which point I was writing scripts."

The title was announced in February 2008, although production conflicts continued to loom. Rucka described the title as, "the worst kept secret in comics for about two years." DCU Executive Editor Dan DiDio remained adamant about the title being published. Rucka said of DiDio's involvement, "He has positively backed this thing from the start, and the number of hits he's taken on this, we've lost count." When the Battle for the Cowl story was published, DC editorial reasoned that the climate of stories without Bruce Wayne was the most logical place to release it. As Rucka described it, "[w]ith Bruce gone, this was the time, and the suggestion was to put it in Detective. And there was precedent for it, so we figured that's great – we'll do that."

== Premise ==
Batwoman battles a madwoman known only as Alice, inspired by Alice in Wonderland, who sees her life as a fairy tale and everyone around her as expendable. Batwoman must stop Alice from unleashing a toxic death cloud over all of Gotham City — but Alice has more up her sleeve than just poison, and Batwoman's life will never be the same.

== Reception ==
The series, most notably the artwork by Williams III, received high critical acclaim. Dan Phillips of IGN Comics noted in a review of the first issue, "Any discussion of Detective Comics #854 should start with Williams' art. Williams' work is absolutely stunning, and the issue is filled with the type of eye-popping double-page sequences that tempt you to carefully disassemble the book and hang the pages on your wall. Williams is a true visionary when it comes to designing a page, and this book includes arguably his most impressive design work yet."

John Bierly of popular Batman website Batman-On-Film.com praised Rucka's story, saying, "Rucka rocks, and he's bringing his "A" game here. I've never read a single comic book featuring Batwoman, and though I'll do research AFTER I write this review, I wanted to come into this as cold as possible and present the viewpoint of someone who's new to the character. I like her. A lot."

The acclaim for Williams' artwork on this series was reflected with the artist's nomination for an Eisner Award for best Penciller/Inker and Best Cover Artist.

== Collected editions ==
Title	Material collected	Published date	ISBN	Notes
Batwoman: Elegy Deluxe Edition	Detective Comics #854-860	30 June 2010	978-1401226923	Hardcover; introduction by MSNBC political commentator Rachel Maddow
Batwoman: Elegy. Issue 854-860	Detective Comics #854-860	10 September 2019	978-1779503336	eBook
Batwoman Omnibus	Detective Comics #854-863, Batwoman (New 52) #0, Batwoman #0-24, Batwoman Annual #1	12 October 2021	978-1401297107	Hardcover
Batwoman: Elegy (New Edition)	Detective Comics #854-860	5 November 2024	978-1779527929	Trade paperback and eBook
Batwoman: Elegy	Detective Comics #854-863	June 17 2025	978-1799501824	DC Compact Comics Edition

A new edition was released in September 2019 with a new cover featuring Ruby Rose as Batwoman.

== In other media ==
Elements of Elegy are incorporated into the first season of the Batwoman series on The CW.

== See also ==
- List of feminist comic books
- Portrayal of women in comics
