= Kate Kane =

Comic book superheroine

- Textless variant cover of Detective Comics #860 (December 2009). Art by Alex Ross.

Publication information
- Publisher: DC Comics
- First appearance: As Kate Kane: 52 #7 (August 2006); As Batwoman: 52 #11 (September 2006)
- Created by: Geoff Johns; Grant Morrison; Greg Rucka; Mark Waid; Alex Ross

In-story information
- Full name: Katherine Rebecca Kane
- Team affiliations: Batman Incorporated; D.E.O.; Justice League; Birds of Prey; Batman Family
- Partnerships: The Question; Maggie Sawyer; Bette Kane
- Supporting character of: Batman
- Notable aliases: Brightbat; Dr. Lisa Frow
- Abilities: Peak human physical condition; Enhanced senses; Trained computer hacker; Expert martial artist and hand-to-hand combatant; High intellect; Expert detective; Master strategist, tactician, and field commander; Utilizes high-tech equipment and weapons

Katherine Rebecca Kane, better known as Batwoman, is a superheroine appearing in American comic books published by DC Comics. Created by writers Greg Rucka, Geoff Johns, Grant Morrison, Mark Waid, and artist Alex Ross, Kane is a wealthy heiress who becomes inspired by the superhero Batman and chooses, like him, to put her wealth and resources toward a campaign to fight crime as a masked vigilante in her home of Gotham City as Batwoman.

This current version of Batwoman, who shares the same name as her counterpart from the Silver Age of comics, debuted in 2006 in the seventh week of the publisher's year-long 52 weekly comic book. Introduced as Kate Kane, the modern Batwoman began operating in Gotham City in Batman's absence following the events of the company-wide crossover Infinite Crisis (2005). The modern Batwoman is written as being of Jewish descent and as a lesbian. During the New 52, it is established that Kate Kane is a cousin of Batman's alter-ego Bruce Wayne, being a niece of his mother Martha Wayne. Described as the highest-profile gay superhero to appear in stories published by DC, Batwoman's sexual orientation drew wide media attention following her reintroduction, as well as both praise and criticism from the general public.

The modern character is depicted in comics works relatively independently of Batman but has gained a considerable profile in recent years, both within the DC Comics publishing schedule and the publisher's fictional universe. She since had several runs in her own eponymous Batwoman monthly comic book and has had stints in the lead role in Detective Comics, the flagship Batman comic book for which DC Comics is named.

Kane appeared in media set in the Arrowverse, initially portrayed by Ruby Rose and later by Wallis Day.

== Publication history ==
Kate Kane's debut in 52 #7 (June 2006). Kane converses with Renee Montoya. Layout by Keith Giffen. Art by Ken Lashley and Draxhall Jump Studios.

Kane's debut as Batwoman in 52 #11 (July 2006). Art by J.G. Jones.

The limited series Infinite Crisis (2005), written as a sequel to the 1985 maxi-series Crisis on Infinite Earths, altered DC Comics continuity. Subsequently, all comic book titles published by DC Comics skip forward one year and a new maxi-series entitled 52 retroactively chronicles the 52 weeks which directly followed Infinite Crisis. When DC editors called for a redesign of Batwoman, comic book artist Alex Ross drew inspiration from the modified Batgirl costume he designed for Barbara Gordon, seven years before Kate Kane's debut in the limited comic book series 52. Ross and comic book author Paul Dini initially planned to revive the former Batgirl Barbara Gordon using an updated version of the character's original costume, with red accents in place of the traditional yellow. However, since Gordon served as one of a very small number of disabled superheroes of DC Comics as Oracle, DC's editorial staff was against revitalizing her at the time. In an interview with Newsarama, Ross states, "They had me change the mask and hair to make it a bit more Batwoman, rather than Batgirl...I pointed out to them that the mask makes her look like the Huntress a little overall—but there weren't many options."

Unlike the Silver Age Kathy Kane, who was romantically attracted to Batman, the new version of Kane is a lesbian, as well as Bruce Wayne's maternal cousin. Her sexual orientation was announced at the same time the character was revealed in the spring of 2006. Stories appeared on television news outlets such as CNN, general news magazines such as USA Today, and gay culture magazines such as Out. The modern Katherine "Kate" Kane made her first comic book appearance in issue #7 of the maxi-series 52, where Kane is revealed to have been romantically involved with Renee Montoya, a former Gotham City Police detective (who later takes up the mantle of the Question after the original hero dies). When questioned about the editorial decision to make Batwoman a gay character in an interview with Wizard Entertainment, DC Comics Senior Vice President and Executive Editor Dan DiDio stated "It was from conversations we've had for expanding the DC Universe, for looking at levels of diversity. We wanted to have a cast that is much more reflective of today's society and even today's fanbase. One of the reasons we made her gay is that, again when you have the Batman Family—a series of characters that aren't super-powered and inhabit the same circle and the same city—you really want to have a point of difference. It was really important to me to make sure every character felt unique."

Batwoman's sexual orientation initially gathered mixed reviews, ranging from praise to outrage. A reviewer at Out asserts "Batwoman will be the highest profile gay superhero to ever grace the pages of DC Comics." Although several LGBT organizations such as GLAAD have praised DC Comics for attempting to diversify their characters, some have observed that Batwoman is not the first gay or lesbian character to appear in comic books, nor is she the only lesbian to be associated with the Batman series.

In the character's civilian identity as a socialite, Katherine Kane is acquainted with Bruce Wayne and is friends with a doctor named Mallory. She is presented with porcelain white skin, several tattoos, and a clothing style defined as punk-psychobilly-goth in her civilian persona. Her father is an Army colonel, and in Detective Comics #854, it is stated she is the cousin of Bette "Flamebird" Kane. The younger Kate also has a stepmother named Catherine Kane, making Catherine the aunt of Bette. At the 2008 New York Comic Con, it was announced that Batwoman would be among the characters appearing in a new Justice League comic book written by James Robinson. That year, Batwoman briefly took over as the lead character in Detective Comics, starting with #854. with DC saying at the 2009 New York Comic Con that she would be DC Comics' highest-profile gay superhero.

Batwoman
- Promotional art for Batwoman #1 (September 2011). Art by J. H. Williams III.

Publication information
- Publisher: DC Comics
- Schedule: Monthly.
- Format: Ongoing series
- Genre: Superhero
- Publication date: September 2011 – April 2015
- No. of issues: 40, plus two Annuals and two #0 issues

Creative team
- Written by: Greg Rucka; J. H. Williams III; W. Haden Blackman; Marc Andreyko
- Artist(s): J. H. Williams III; Jock; Amy Reeder; Jeremy Haun

In 2010, DC announced that Batwoman would star in a series with art by J. H. Williams III, who would also co-write the series with writer W. Haden Blackman. Artist Amy Reeder Hadley would also contribute art, alternating story arcs with Williams. The series' introductory "zero issue" was released on November 24, 2010. The launch of Batwoman #1 was originally scheduled for February 2011, then delayed until spring; in early March it was announced that Batwoman #1 would be released sometime in Fall 2011, as part of the New 52 rebooted DC Universe.

In September 2013, co-authors J.H. Williams and W. Haden Blackman announced that they would leave Batwoman after the December issue because of conflicts with DC over storylines. They remarked that they were not allowed to expand Killer Croc's back story, keep their original ending to their current story arc, or show Kate and Maggie getting married. This announcement followed a February 2013 announcement that Batwoman #17 would feature the proposal between Kate and Maggie. DC Comics announced that Batwoman could not get married because "heroes shouldn't have happy personal lives".

In December 2014, it was announced that the series would be canceled in March at issue forty, along with twelve other New 52 series.

In 2016, it was announced that Batwoman would be one of the lead characters in the DC Comics Rebirth revamp of Detective Comics, which returned to its original numbering with issue #934.

In July 2023, DC announced that Batwoman, along with Batwing, would lead a new Outsiders series after the conclusion of the "Gotham War" crossover event.

In March 2026, a new volume of the Batwoman ongoing series debuted, under the DC Next Level branding.

== Character biography ==
=== Origins and early career ===
Kate Kane battles Whisper A'Daire's bestial followers as Batwoman. Art breakdown by Keith Giffen, pencilled by Joe Bennett (artist).

In 52 #7, Kate Kane is introduced (although she is referred to as Kathy on several occasions). No Origins titles have been presented for Kate Kane; her fictional backstory is presented in Detective Comics through the use of exposition and flashbacks. In their early childhood, Katherine Rebecca "Kate" Kane and her sister Elizabeth "Beth" Kane were identical twins who shared a very close bond. Their parents were career soldiers in the United States Army, and the twins were raised at least partially in Fort Bragg, North Carolina. (Note: Jacob Kane was a member of the 3rd Special Forces Group, and Gabrielle Kane was part of the 525th Battlefield Surveillance Brigade, both based out of Fort Bragg.) Their father, Jacob "Jake" Kane, was promoted to colonel sometime before their twelfth birthday and reassigned to a NATO position in Brussels, Belgium, and the family moved there.

On the twins' twelfth birthday, Jacob could not come home to celebrate with them due to a security crisis, so Kate and Beth were taken by their mother, Gabrielle Kane, to the Grand-Place for chocolate and waffles, their favorite dish. On the way to the restaurant, a group of gunmen attacked the family and took them hostage, killing their bodyguard in the process. After learning of his family's kidnapping, Jacob Kane led a rescue mission to save his captured family, which ended with Kate's mother being executed and Beth apparently killed after being caught in the crossfire between the kidnappers and soldiers. Jacob and Kate move back to the States and settle in the Washington metropolitan area, where Jacob receives significant promotions and Kate completes middle school and high school, seemingly at private institutions.

Kate attends the United States Military Academy, where she receives excellent grades, performs well in physical fitness and sports, earns prestigious awards, and achieves the rank of Brigade Executive Officer in her senior year; she also maintains a secret romantic relationship with her roommate, Sophie Moore. Shortly after her class's Ring Weekend ceremony, Kate is anonymously accused of homosexual conduct. The academy's Brigade Tactical Officer asks her to disavow the allegation on account of her outstanding record, mentioning that if she does, she will be demoted but still be able to graduate. Telling the BTO that she refuses to lie and violate the Honor Code of the academy, Kate admits to being lesbian and is forced to leave the school. When she confronts her father with the news, he supports her and affirms that she upheld her honor and integrity. Sometime later, Jacob marries Catherine Hamilton Kane.

Kate then moves back to Gotham City where she attends college and descends into a wild social lifestyle, consisting of parties, heavy drinking, and one-night stands. During this time she also gets three tattoos: a black version of the 1st Special Forces Command (Airborne) arrowhead insignia on her right bicep, (Note: This is a copy of a tattoo Gabi Kane had.) a bluebird on her left shoulder, and a large red-and-black nautical star on her upper back. Kate is eventually pulled over for speeding by a young Renee Montoya, who was just a traffic cop at this point. The two date for several months but break up following a fight where Renee expresses concern about Kate's lack of direction in her life and Kate berates Renee for keeping her sexuality hidden from her colleagues and family. While attempting to call Renee and apologize for her behavior, Kate is attacked by a mugger who wants her wallet and cell phone. Using her military training, Kate easily defeats the criminal just as Batman arrives and helps her off the ground. She is then shown fixated by the Bat-Signal as Batman departs the scene.

Inspired by her encounter with the caped crusader, Kate sobers up and begins fighting crime using military body armor and weaponry stolen from her father's military base and purchased off the black market; she operates for close to a year before her father finds out. After being confronted by Jacob, Kate accepts his offer of assistance and begins an intense two years of training across the globe with some of her father's friends from the special operations community. Upon returning to Gotham, Kate discovers that her father has created a Batsuit for her, along with an arsenal of experimental weaponry based on Batman's known gadgetry and a bunker hidden in the panic room in Kate's apartment.

The first reference to the modern Batwoman is made by the Penguin in Detective Comics #824 who suggests Batman bring a date to the opening of his club, asking, "Why don't you bring that new Batwoman? I hear she's kind of hot." In 52 #7 (2006) the new Batwoman is introduced. Kane is revealed to have been intimately involved with former Gotham City police detective Renee Montoya and is heiress to one of the wealthiest families in Gotham, owning that which the Wayne family does not. In her third appearance in issue #11 of 52 entitled "Batwoman Begins", Kane assists Montoya and her partner the Question in a mystery revolving around a warehouse owned by Kane's family. When Montoya and the Question are attacked sometime later by Whisper A'Daire's shapeshifting minions, Kane intervenes as Batwoman and rescues them.

In 52 #28 (2006), after Montoya learns that the "Book of Crime", a sacred text of Intergang, contains a prophecy foretelling the brutal murder of the "twice named daughter of Kane", she and the Question return to Gotham, joining forces with Batwoman in issue #30 in order to avert Intergang's plans. Batwoman later appears in a story written by Greg Rucka for the DC Infinite Holiday Special (2006). As Batwoman continues the case, she is joined by Nightwing, who has recently returned to Gotham and becomes infatuated with her. On Christmas Eve, he gives her an 'official' Batarang. She also celebrates Hanukkah with Renee, and the two kiss shortly before Christmas. This story introduced some of Kane's background, including the fact that she is Jewish. In issue #48 of 52 (2007), when Intergang realizes that the image of Batwoman in the Crime Bible and the cited "twice-named daughter of Cain" were one and the same, they ransack Kane's apartment, kidnapping her with the intention to sacrifice her. Montoya arrives too late to stop the ritual, finding Kate bound and gagged to an altar as Bruno Mannheim plunges a knife through her heart. In the ensuing confrontation, the freed Batwoman pulls the knife out of her own chest to stab Mannheim, and then collapses in Renee's arms. She survives her wounds after Renee stops the bleeding in time. As she recuperates in her penthouse, Renee, disguised in her new alter ego as the Question, shines the Bat-Signal into her apartment and asks, "Are you ready?"

=== 2007–2009: Countdown, Final Crisis ===
Batwoman subsequently appears in the fifty-two-issue weekly series Countdown, intended to act as a prelude to DC's summer crossover event the following year. Batwoman appears in Countdown #39 (2007), after the Question confronts Trickster and Pied Piper, having trailed them from the Penguin's Iceberg Lounge nightclub. Batwoman also makes an appearance in the miniseries Crime Bible: The Five Lessons of Blood (2007) alongside the Question. Batwoman is seen again on the final page of Grant Morrison's Final Crisis #3 (2008), one month after the Anti-Life Equation was released, as a new Female Fury along with Wonder Woman, Catwoman, and Giganta. She is also seen in Final Crisis: Revelations #3 attacking the Question after having just been infected with the Anti-Life Equation.

=== 2009–2011: Detective Comics lead feature ===
Following the events of Final Crisis and Battle for the Cowl, in which Bruce Wayne has supposedly died and is replaced by Dick Grayson, Kate becomes the lead of Detective Comics from issues 854 to 863. In the first story, entitled "Elegy", Batwoman is seen investigating the arrival of a new leader of the Religion of Crime in Gotham. She briefly meets Batman (it is intentionally left ambiguous whether or not it is Dick Grayson or Bruce Wayne) to discuss her findings. Kate demonstrates greater knowledge of the Religion of Crime, and even corrects Batman by saying there are 13 and not 12 covens of the religion in Gotham. Batman concedes the case to her, and comments on the length of her hair (though panels on the same page reveal the long red wig hides her actual hair, styled short).

Aspects of her personal life are also revealed, including her relationship with her colonel father. The strain of her late-night vigilante activity has also taken a toll on her romantic relationships. Her lateness and nighttime absences are interpreted by her girlfriend as an on-the-side liaison with another woman. She breaks the relationship off as she believes Kate is not ready to commit to an exclusive relationship. Kate alludes to a past traumatic incident which she claims still haunts her. As she vaguely describes the experience, her face is shown superimposed on the page over a restrained girl with a bag over her head. She later tracks down the new leader of the Religion of Crime: an elaborately costumed woman named Alice. Throughout the conflict that ensues, Batwoman observes that Alice only speaks in quotations from Lewis Carroll, believing herself to be Alice Liddell. Alice denies a connection to the Mad Hatter.

While attending a fundraising gala for the Gotham City Police Department, Kate meets and flirts with detective Maggie Sawyer, and runs into her cousin Bette Kane (better known as the Teen Titans member Flamebird). Kate is unaware of her cousin's vigilante activities. While dancing with Maggie, Kate is approached by Kyle Abbot, a former employee of Bruno Mannheim who split from the Religion of Crime after the events of 52. Through a conversation with Abbot, Kate discovers that Alice has kidnapped her father and plans to destroy Gotham by spreading a deadly airborne chemical from a hijacked airplane, thus succeeding where Mannheim failed. Batwoman boards the plane and defeats Alice's subordinates, eventually stopping the plot and rescuing her father in the process. However, Alice is accidentally thrown from the plane, only to be caught by Batwoman. Alice then shocks her by saying that Batwoman has "our father's eyes", apparently revealing that she is Kate's sister Beth (who was believed to have been killed years ago). With Batwoman stunned by the revelation, Alice stabs her in the wrist with a knife. Batwoman is forced to release her grip, sending Alice to her apparent demise in the river below.

In the aftermath of this discovery, Kate locks herself in her crime lab and tries to come to terms with what just happened, while the police struggle in vain to find any sign of Alice's corpse. These scenes are depicted among numerous flashback sequences that comprise most of the issue. Throughout them, a back story is provided from her childhood that depicts Kate, her twin sister Beth, and their mother being kidnapped. While Kate's father can rescue her, it appears as though both her sister and mother have been killed by the time he arrives.

Batwoman appears in the miniseries Justice League: Cry for Justice, a set-up for a new ongoing Justice League title. When the Justice League of America splits up following Bruce Wayne's death and a disastrous confrontation with the Shadow Cabinet, Green Lantern Hal Jordan leads a group of superheroes to Gotham to track down Prometheus. Kate is shown stalking the heroes from the rooftops after they encounter Clayface. Batwoman later contacts both Leagues at the JLA Watchtower, informing them she encountered and engaged supervillain Delores Winters, who mysteriously collapsed and died right as she was about to be taken into custody. The heroes request that Kate bring the body up to them, but she declines, telling them that she is much too busy due to a rash of criminal uprisings going on in Gotham. Firestorm is then sent to retrieve the corpse from Kate and bring it to the team, who discover that Dolores was forced into fighting using a mind-control device. In a text piece included in Justice League: Cry for Justice #6, writer James Robinson revealed that Batwoman was initially intended to be part of his new Justice League line-up, but this plan fell apart after Cry for Justice was shortened into a miniseries rather than an ongoing title. This explains why Batwoman is present on the cover of the first issue, and why she was initially said to be a member of the team when the book was first announced.

Later, Kate appears as part of Batman and Robin: Blackest Knight. Batwoman is kidnapped by cultists and taken to London for her to once again be sacrificed. She is sealed within a coffin and taken underground to the last remaining Lazarus Pit for the ritual to begin. She is saved by the timely intervention of Dick Grayson and British superheroes Knight and Squire. After learning that Grayson plans on placing Bruce Wayne's corpse into the Pit to revive him, Kate strongly protests, but he simply ignores her. True to Kate's warnings, Bruce (in reality an insane clone created by Darkseid) emerges from the Pit and attacks the heroes. As the battle takes place, the cultists who kidnapped Kate detonate explosives surrounding the Pit, causing a massive cave-in. Grayson discovers Kate, buried alive and paralyzed from the waist down. Using morphine from Grayson's utility belt, Kate deliberately commits suicide by overdose to be resurrected and healed by the nearby Pit. This plan is successful, and Kate returns to Gotham with the others. Furthermore, since Kate did technically die, the cultists consider their goal completed. Before leaving to return to her home, Grayson flirts with Kate by telling her that he has a thing for red-haired crime-fighters (a reference to his previous love interests, Barbara Gordon and Starfire), apparently unaware of Kate's sexuality.

Batwoman also begins hunting down a crazed serial killer known as the Cutter, who has been abducting young women and cutting off parts of their faces to create the perfect woman. He eventually kidnaps Bette, but Kate tracks the killer to his lair and attacks him. During the fight, Batwoman reveals her identity to Bette when she mentions her tennis career, and in the aftermath Bette is seen in her Flamebird outfit, saying that she wants to be Kate's new partner.

In Batman Inc. Batwoman hunts a gangster named Johnny Valentine, who is wanted for his connection to the murders of three U.S. Marines. She tracks him to a local circus, the same one once owned by her predecessor, Kathy Kane. While chasing Valentine through a haunted house, Batwoman is attacked by what appears to be Kathy Kane's ghost. Batwoman struggles with and eventually defeats the "ghost", who is revealed to be nothing more than a blonde-haired female assassin clad in a wig and a replica of Kathy's costume. Kate realizes that she recognizes the assassin, and asks her father to run a facial-recognition scan. While Kate restrains her attacker, her father reveals that Valentine is connected to a supervillain operating out of South America, and tells Kate that she needs to get down there to find out what is going on.

Batwoman appears as a member of an all-female team of heroes created by Wonder Woman to repel a faux-alien invasion of Washington DC masterminded by Professor Ivo. After the battle is over, Kate asks Wonder Woman if she wants to accompany Kate and the other heroines to a bar to celebrate, but Wonder Woman politely turns them down to attend the college graduation ceremony of her old friend, Vanessa Kapatelis.

=== 2011–2015: New 52 self-titled series ===
In 2010, the character began appearing in the self-titled series Batwoman. After an introductory "zero" issue in 2010, the series launched fully in 2011 with Batwoman #1 along with DC's company-wide renumbering of its titles that year. Writers J.H. Williams III and W. Haden Blackman chose to expand Kate's supporting cast both in terms of her family (the Kanes, including Elizabeth, Bette and other relatives), and the "Batman Family" she is more loosely connected to. Issue seventeen was also a milestone as it featured Kate proposing to her girlfriend, Maggie Sawyer.

=== 2016–present: DC Rebirth/Infinite Frontier/All-In Next Level ===
In the Detective Comics title, Batman recruits Batwoman to help run a "boot camp" for young heroes, consisting of Red Robin, Orphan, Spoiler, and Clayface. Batwoman is essentially Batman's co-lead in the first arc (#934-#940), which depicts the team fighting the Colony, a top-secret military organization that mimics Batman's methods. The next two issues are part of the crossover event Night of the Monster Men. Issues 943-947 cover a group of "collateral damage" individuals called the Victim Syndicate, attempting to put an end to Batman's vigilantism. Issues 948 and 949 are collectively called Batwoman Begins. These two issues are a prologue for Batwoman getting her own title again.

Batwoman plays a minor role in the first arc of the Young Animal series Mother Panic, where she tracks down and briefly interacts with the title character, who is a new vigilante in Gotham. The comic implies that Kate Kane has a romantic past with Violet Paige, the protagonist, which Kate is "still mad" about.

February 2017's Batwoman: Rebirth #1 lead into March 2017's Batwoman vol. 2 #1. The new series follows Batwoman as she, accompanied by Julia Pennyworth, works to dismantle a global terrorist group known as The Many Arms of Death while dealing with resurfacing issues from her past. In the final issue of this series, Kate rekindles her relationship with Renee Montoya.

In the "Fall of the Batmen" arc of Detective Comics and its aftermath, Clayface is tortured by the Victim Syndicate into becoming aggressive and violent. During his rampage, he absorbs excess clay matter from the training simulation room used by the team, which makes him grow to a giant size. When all nonlethal attempts to stop his attack fail, Batwoman fatally shoots him with a special rifle that destabilizes his matter. This action causes a schism in the team, leading Batwoman (along with Batwing and Azrael) to join the Colony. The Colony is disbanded in the final issue of the initial Rebirth run, along with Kate and Bruce making amends.

Kate is displaced from her Gotham residence during the storylines "The Fall and the Fallen" and "City of Bane" in the main Batman series, being out of the city on a mission when Bane takes it over. She takes up temporary residence in an apartment in Atlanta. In Black Mask: Year of the Villain #1, she assists Renee Montoya in tracking down Black Mask, who coincidentally fled to Atlanta to begin a new criminal enterprise after escaping a deadly police shootout just before Bane's takeover. They manage to track him down, but he escapes after shooting Renee in the shoulder, which thus distracts Kate while she attempts to render first aid.

In the Batman/Superman story "Planet Braniac," Batwoman and Steel team up to save Batman and Superman, who were captured on the dark side of the Moon while investigating a Brainiac signal.

During "The Joker War" crossover storyline, Batwoman assisted Batman in recapturing Wayne Tower, which had been taken over by the Joker's henchmen, who were using the building's fabrication facilities for manufacturing weapons and vehicles to aid their side of the conflict. Additionally, she helped rescue Lucius Fox, who had been dosed with Joker Toxin and forced to help this production process.

Batwoman meets with Renee in the Batman: Urban Legends story "Survivor's Guilt," during which the two discuss Renee's decision to accept the GCPD Commissionership. Despite her initial willingness to accept the offer, Renee becomes conflicted about the decision due to a run-in earlier in the evening with a man she had arrested years prior, which reminded her of the abuses of police power she witnessed as an officer and a detective (and which, to a lesser degree, she had even participated in at times). After talking things over with Kate, Renee eventually concludes that she has the opportunity to help atone for past wrongs using the power of the office.

In the story "Disinformation Campaign," part of the "Fear State" crossover storyline, Batwoman seeks out information regarding Seer, an "Anti-Oracle" who is flooding Gotham City with misinformation during the larger crisis orchestrated by Scarecrow and contributing to the city's panic. Her sister Beth, still dealing with her lingering Alice persona, helps her on this mission, disguising herself as Alice to infiltrate a gathering of the Religion of Crime and convince them to find Seer. Despite failing to recruit the RoC members, the twins still discover Seer's whereabouts and relay the information to Nightwing and Oracle. The story also reveals that Kate and Renee had broken up sometime before the events of "Fear State". Later the same night, working solo, Kate frees City Hall from the Red Crown terrorist group, who had taken it over after posing as the mayor's security detail.

In the "Shadows of the Bat" storyline, Kate infiltrates Arkham Tower, a new replacement for Arkham Asylum, by using the alias Dr. Lisa Frow and getting hired as a psychiatrist to investigate both the building and Dr. Tobias Wear, the head of the facility.

In The Aquamen miniseries, Kate assists Jackson Hyde in taking down Atlantean sleeper agents activated by Peter Mortimer in Gotham, as well as locating Mortimer himself. Dialogue between Kate and Jackson indicates they're on a first-name basis, and implies Kate is on a first-name basis with Arthur Curry as well.

In the "Verdict" arc of Harley Quinn, Kate breaks Harley out of Blackgate Prison after suspecting she has been framed for a series of murders. The two work together to find Verdict, the real killer, and clear Harley's name, culminating in Kate defusing multiple bombs inside City Hall as Harley fights Verdict.

A new Batwoman ongoing series began in March 2026, written once again by Greg Rucka. It shows Kate recovering in a Greek psychiatric facility following her belief that she was responsible for Beth's death. Her twin sister resurfaces alive and dressed as Batwoman herself, but Kate calms her and has her committed.

== Characterization ==
Similar to her cousin Bruce, Kate uses her status as a rich socialite to disguise her vigilante activities; however, unlike Bruce, whose playboy persona is usually depicted as a facade, Kate enjoys her public lifestyle, a trait which Bruce himself admires. Naturally confident and flirtatious, Kate adapted such characteristics for intel-gathering purposes as a vigilante.

Kate lives in a penthouse atop the R.H. Kane building that also contains her crimefighting headquarters, and holds an office job of some sort. She is an occasional gig musician at various bars around Gotham, performing as a guitarist.

Though never outright stated, the Kanes are implied to be of the Reform Judaism denomination, as Kate and Beth were not preparing for a bat mitzvah on their 12th birthday. Kate displays a menorah (Note: The depiction of this menorah in the comics is a nine-branched hanukkiah of the type used in the celebration of Hanukkah, though a seven-branched menorah is a kind typically displayed in homes.) and Shabbat candles in her penthouse and celebrates Jewish holidays, but does not follow kosher dietary restrictions.

Greg Rucka mentions Kate as being shaped by her parents, who demonstrated "the best of what [military] culture can offer", including personal responsibility, integrity, service, and dimunitization of personal gratification. In particular, Kate takes after her father Jacob, as she specifically emulated his levelheaded demeanor in the wake their family tragedy to counteract her grief and inherent hotheadedness. This personality shift is something she maintained into adulthood. In James Tynion IV's short story "The Wrong Side of the Looking Glass", this emulation of Jacob is expanded upon as including feelings of gender variance that Kate experienced as a child even before the kidnappings; though Kate is cisgender, from a young age she was more interested in masculine pastimes like her father was, something she found confusing and troubling at the time in light of her much more feminine sister.

Rucka notes that Kate considers her vigilantism no different than military service and likens her adoption of the Batsymbol to fighting under a flag; following an ideal instead of an individual. Sara Century of Syfy Wire describes Kate as a "loyal but not unquestioning" ally to Batman despite their disagreements.

Unlike most members of the Batfamily, Kate has no ethical qualms about using lethal force if necessary, but also dislikes euthanasia. Her opinion may have subsequently changed, since in her 2026 series she states that "Batwoman doesn't kill! She does not kill."

== Abilities ==
=== Skills and training ===
In high school, Kate Kane was a Senior Elite-level gymnast, and later graduated at the top of her class. Along with her required military training at West Point (which included instruction in Modern Army Combatives), she completed Air Assault School and the US Army Airborne School, and earned the Recondo Badge, all while maintaining a 95th percentile or better class rank and an above-average Cadet Performance Score. As a cadet, she also competed in boxing (having been taught by her father as a teenager), and is implied to have won an academy boxing championship against Sophie Moore sometime before their senior year. Larry Hama's short story "Honor Code" establishes that Kate, early in her senior year as a cadet, was skilled enough in both psychological warfare and the Pashto language to be sent on a mission to Afghanistan to capture a terrorist leader. (Note: Though the story does not directly indicate it, Kate serving in Afghanistan and engaging in combat as she does in the story would have qualified her for the Afghanistan Campaign Medal.) Additionally, the story mentions Kate is an expert-level marksman on the M4 Carbine and M92 pistol and "maxed her PT requirements", indicating she earned the maximum score on the Army Physical Fitness Test and the Indoor Obstacle Course Test.

While traveling the world during her post-West Point debauchery, Kate fractured her skull in a diving mishap off the coast of Coryana, a so-called "pirate nation" located in the Mediterranean Sea. After washing up on the island, her head wound was crudely stitched together with gold thread, which left Kate with a limited ability to detect electromagnetic fields, similar to the notion of dental fillings picking up radio waves.

During her Batwoman training, Kate was taught by members of various special operations units, such as the Green Berets, Navy SEALs, SAS, and others. There is a strong implication that one of her non-military trainers was Green Arrow antagonist Shado. Kate learned a much wider variety of martial arts during this time, including karate, Krav Maga, Muay Thai, taekwondo, and Wing Chun; she has mentioned knowing a total of at least 14 styles. Additionally, she received training in military strategy, weaponry, parkour, wingsuiting, survival skills, and specialized skills such as bomb disposal; this included instruction at the FBI Academy. She also underwent resistance training for torture and incapacitating agents like tear gas.

=== Technology and weapons ===
Personal Armor

Batwoman's suit was designed and built by Jacob Kane in a red-and-black color scheme and incorporates features similar to Batman's own batsuit. (Note: Upon seeing the suit for the first time, Kate (recalling an earlier conversation with Jacob where he stated her vigilantism would be like going to war) notes that the red of the suit reminds her of Gevurah and that it is "the color of war.") The main bodysuit uses dilatant-based armor and contains encrypted radio, GPS, and biotelemetry transmitters. The cape is made from a composite nanotube material and has weighted, sharpened edges that allow it to be used as a weapon in addition to its gliding function. The suit's gloves are heat-resistant to at least 1,000 °C (1,830 °F).

During her time with the DEO, Batwoman's suit received permanent upgrades, such as tasers built into her gauntlets and gloves. Her cowl was also improved during this time, giving it thermal imaging, anti-flashbang, and anti-hypnosis capabilities.

In the DC Rebirth era, each of Batwoman's gauntlets gained hard light projectors on the forearm, as well as a capacitive outer shell.

Kate also has a "space armor" variant of her suit that is suitable for use on the Moon.

Red Knight One

Batwoman's primary mode of transportation is a customized motorcycle called Red Knight One. It is usually depicted as a black Ducati 1098 with a large red stylized bat-shaped fairing on the front fork. Red Knight One is voice-activated and contains a simple AI and radar system.

Weaponry

Batwoman uses folding, S-shaped throwing weapons that are stored along the outer forearm of her gauntlets in a fin-like orientation; while stored, they can be used as fixed blades, removed and thrown by hand, or remotely launched.

Though never depicted being used in the field, Kate owns a collection of firearms and knives that she keeps stored in her headquarters. Among these are an L85A1 rifle, a pair of M16s, and two karambits.

== Other versions ==
- An alternate timeline variant of Kate Kane appears in Flashpoint. This version is a member of Team 7 who is later killed during a botched attack on a terrorist training camp.
- An alternate universe variant of Kate Kane appears in Nightwing: The New Order. This version lost faith in vigilantism and joined the Department of Defense, supporting Dick Grayson and the suppression of metahumans until he is chosen to lead an anti-superpower task force over her, for which she grows to resent him. By 2040, she works to have Dick and his metahuman son Jake arrested until the pair restore the metahuman population's powers, after which Kane retires.
- A vampiric possible future variant of Kate Kane appears in Batwoman: Future's End #1.
- An alternate timeline variant of Kate Kane appears in DC Comics Bombshells. This version operated as an adventurer in the 1930s who worked to keep her father's company afloat during the Great Depression and fought in the Spanish Civil War with her then-girlfriend, Renee Montoya. Upon returning to Gotham City in 1938, Kane becomes inspired to don a black baseball uniform, wield a bat, become the Batwoman, and fight crime. During this time, she was pursued by and fell in love with GCPD officer Maggie Sawyer, who agreed to maintain Kane's secret identity. Amidst World War II, Kane joins a team of Batgirls in protecting the United States from criminals and is recruited by Amanda Waller to enlist as a member of the Bombshells.
- A possible future variant of Kate Kane appears in Future State as a member of Nightwing's resistance.

== Collected editions ==
| # | Title | Material collected | Pages | Date Published | ISBN |
|---|---|---|---|---|---|
| Batwoman: Elegy | | Detective Comics #854–860 | 192 | June 14, 2011 | 978-1401231460 |
| Batwoman by Greg Rucka and JH Williams III | | Detective Comics #854–863 | 256 | June 20, 2017 | 978-1401274139 |
| Batwoman Omnibus | | Detective Comics #854–863, Batwoman #0−24, and Batwoman Annual #1. | 888 | October 12, 2021 | 978-1401297107 |
The New 52
| 1 | Hydrology | Batwoman #1–5, #0 | 144 | June 2012 | 978-1781163610 |
| 2 | To Drown the World | Batwoman #6–11 | 144 | January 2013 | 978-1401237905 |
| 3 | World's Finest | Batwoman #0 (vol. 2), #12–17 | 168 | September 2013 | 978-1401242466 |
| 4 | This Blood is Thick | Batwoman #18–24 | 144 | April 2014 | 978-1401246211 |
| 5 | Webs | Batwoman #25–34, Annual #1 | 272 | November 2014 | 978-1401250829 |
| 6 | The Unknowns | Secret Origins #3, Batwoman #35–40, Annual #2, Batwoman Futures End #1 | 208 | June 2015 | 978-1401254681 |
DC Rebirth
| 1 | The Many Arms of Death | Batwoman: Rebirth, #1−6 | 168 | November 21, 2017 | 978-1401274306 |
| 2 | Wonderland | Batwoman #7−11 | 128 | June 5, 2018 | 978-1401278717 |
| 3 | The Fall of the House of Kane | Batwoman #12−18 | 168 | January 22, 2019 | 978-1401285777 |

== In other media ==
=== Television ===
Promotional image of Ruby Rose as Kate Kane / Batwoman for the Arrowverse's 2018 "Elseworlds" crossover event.

- Kate Kane / Batwoman appears in media set in the Arrowverse, initially portrayed by Ruby Rose and subsequently by Wallis Day.
  - First appearing the crossover "Elseworlds", she assists the Green Arrow, the Flash, Supergirl, and their allies in reaching Arkham Asylum and Dr. John Deegan.
  - Kane appears in Batwoman. In the first season, after spending time away from Gotham, she returns to join her father Jacob Kane at his security firm, The Crows, before learning of her missing cousin Bruce Wayne's secret identity as Batman and becomes Batwoman to uphold his legacy with help from Luke Fox. In May 2020 and following the first season, Rose departed Batwoman, leading to Javicia Leslie being cast as Kane's successor Ryan Wilder. In the second season, Kate is presumed dead in a plane crash. Wilder discovers the wreckage, finds Kate's batsuit, deduces her identity, and becomes the new Batwoman. Wilder later discovers Kate had survived the crash, but suffered a traumatic accident, had to undergo facial reconstruction surgery, and was captured by Black Mask. After rescuing her, Kate gives Wilder her blessing to continue on as Batwoman while she leaves Gotham to find Wayne.
  - Kate appears in the crossover "Crisis on Infinite Earths". Additionally, her Earth-99 counterpart makes a non-speaking cameo appearance via a photograph.
- Batwoman makes non-speaking cameo appearances in Young Justice as a member of the Justice League and Batman Inc.

=== Film ===
- Batwoman makes a cameo appearance in the DC Animated Movie Universe (DCAMU) film Batman vs. Robin.
- Batwoman appears in the DCAMU film Batman: Bad Blood, voiced by Yvonne Strahovski. This version works with Batman, who disapproves of her use of live guns and ammunition in combat, and has known Dick Grayson since childhood.
- Kate Kane makes a non-speaking cameo appearance in the DCAMU film The Death of Superman as an attendee of Superman's funeral.
- Batwoman appears in Lego DC Batman: Family Matters, voiced by Tara Strong.
- Batwoman makes a non-speaking cameo appearance in the DCAMU film Justice League Dark: Apokolips War, where she is killed by Paradooms.
- Batwoman appears in Catwoman: Hunted, voiced by Stephanie Beatriz.

=== Video games ===
- Batwoman appears in DC Universe Online, voiced by Christina Moore.
- Batwoman appears as a playable DLC character in Lego Batman 3: Beyond Gotham.
- Kate Kane makes a cameo appearance in Batman: Arkham Knight via Bruce Wayne's voicemail, voiced by Tasia Valenza. This version is engaged to marry Maggie Sawyer.
- Batwoman appears as an unlockable playable character in Lego DC Super-Villains.
- The Arrowverse incarnation of Batwoman appears as a playable character in the mobile version of Injustice 2.

=== Miscellaneous ===
Batwoman appears in the Injustice: Gods Among Us prequel comic as a member of Batman's Insurgency and wife of Renee Montoya. After losing her teammate Huntress to Wonder Woman, Batwoman develops a grudge against the latter and eventually attempts to seek revenge, but ultimately spares her to prove herself as the better person between them. Sometime later, Batwoman sacrifices herself to distract Superman and buy time for an alternate universe Justice League to return to their world.
