= Gustines =

Gustines is a surname. Notable people with the surname include:

- George Gustines (born 1971), American dramatist
- Heliodoro Gustines (born 1940), Panamanian jockey
