= Beth Kane =

- Beth Kane as Red Alice, on the cover of Batwoman (vol. 2) #39 (February 2015). Art by Rafael Albuquerque

Publication information
- Publisher: DC Comics
- First appearance: As Alice: Detective Comics #854 (August 2009); As Beth Kane: Detective Comics #857 (November 2009); As Red Alice: Batwoman (vol. 2) #35 (December 2014); As the Mother of War: Batwoman (vol. 3) #13 (May 2018)
- Created by: Alice and Beth Kane: Greg Rucka; J. H. Williams III; Red Alice: Mark Andreyko; George Jeanty; The Mother of War: Marguerite Bennett; Fernando Blanco

In-story information
- Full name: Elizabeth Kane
- Species: Human
- Team affiliations: Religion of Crime; Department of Extranormal Operations; Many Arms of Death; The Unknowns
- Partnerships: Batwoman
- Notable aliases: Alice; Mother of War; Red Alice
- Abilities: Criminal mastermind; Expert use of chemicals, explosives, hallucinogens, and poisons; Immunity to chemical weapons and poisons

Elizabeth Kane is a fictional character appearing in American comic books published by DC Comics. Beginning as a supervillain and eventually evolving into a superhero, she was created by Greg Rucka and J. H. Williams III and first appeared in August 2009 in Detective Comics.

Her relationship with her twin sister Kate Kane defines much of Batwoman's emotional life. During The New 52, it is established that Kate and Beth are cousins of Bruce Wayne, the alter-ego of the superhero Batman, through his mother Martha Wayne (née Kane).

Her origin story involves getting kidnapped by terrorists alongside her mother, Gabi Kane, and Kate, and because she wasn't rescued by their father Jacob she was presumed dead. However, she was in fact alive, and eventually became the leader of the Religion of Crime, before becoming an antagonist to her sister, who had begun her career as Batwoman.

After being once again presumed dead following her fall from a plane, she was resurrected by the Department of Extranormal Operations (D.E.O.) and decided to redeem herself after getting psychological help, becoming an ally to her sister from that point on. She has used villainous identities such as Alice and the Mother of War and the heroic alias Red Alice through her history.

Alice appears in the Arrowverse TV series Batwoman as part of the main cast, portrayed by Rachel Skarsten.

== Publication history ==
Alice was created by Greg Rucka and J. H. Williams III, making her first appearance in Detective Comics #854 (August 2009), having an antagonistic role in Batwoman: Elegy as a whole.

After the DC Universe was reset during The New 52, Beth make cameo roles in story arcs such as Batwoman: Hydrology and Batwoman: Webs, before having a main role in Batwoman: The Unknowns, this time under the heroic identity of Red Alice, appearing in nearly all issues. Much later, she had a villainous role in the story arc Batwoman: Fall of the House of Kane.

== Fictional character biography ==
=== Origin story ===
Alice's origin is told in flashback. Elizabeth "Beth" Kane is the identical twin sister of Katherine "Kate" Kane, and was older than Kate by two minutes. She is the daughter of Jacob Kane and his wife Gabrielle Kane, both career soldiers in the U.S. Army. The Kanes are Jewish, and Jacob Kane inherited vast wealth along with his other siblings. (Note: The Kanes are one of the most influential families in Gotham City, along with the Waynes, Elliotts, and Cobblepots. Their fortune dates to the early 1800s, with the Kane manor house built in 1823. The Kanes owned most of Kane County (land adjacent to Gotham City).) Bette Kane (the superheroine known as Flamebird, and later Hawkfire) is a cousin, and Bruce Wayne's mother Martha Kane Wayne was Jacob's sister.

Jacob Kane is promoted to colonel and assigned to NATO headquarters in Brussels, Belgium. When the twins turned 12 years old, their mother took them to a restaurant for a birthday dessert. A terrorist group (later revealed to be the organization known as the "Many Arms of Death") kidnapped the family, and Col. Kane led a rescue mission to save them. During the battle, Gabrielle was murdered by the terrorists. (Note: Col. Kane marries Catherine Hamilton some years later, who becomes a stepmother to Kate.) The terrorists kidnapped another young girl and murdered her too. Kate, seeing the body of a young girl under a blanket, is left with the impression her sister died. Col. Kane, however, knew that the terrorists had Beth. Despite looking for years, Col. Kane never found Beth. He never told Kate that Beth might still be alive. (Note: What the goal of the terrorists was, why they targeted the Kanes, who the dead child was, what exactly happened to Beth during her captivity, and more have not yet been explained in publications by DC Comics.) The Many Arms of Death needed twins to rule their organization, but since Kate Kane was rescued this meant Beth was not useful to them. Beth's fragile psyche led the Many Arms of Death to send her to the United States, where she was raised by the Religion of Crime.

15 Years later, Kate Kane becomes Batwoman.

=== First appearance ===
Alice in her first appearance in Detective Comics #854 (August 2009).

Alice makes her first appearance in 2009 in Detective Comics #854 (August 2009). With the death of Bruno Mannheim, the supervillain group known as the Religion of Crime is leaderless. The thirteen covens that make up the Religion of Crime elect Alice to lead the group, giving her the title "High Madame". Beth is shown to be insane, as she dresses in clothes and makeup to resemble the character Alice from Lewis Carroll's novels and only speaks in quotations from the Alice novels. (Note: Whether the source of the Alice persona is due to trauma, a personality overlay implanted by the terrorist group, or an outgrowth of Beth's own innate psychological problems is never explained.) She kills a number of members of her own group when they fail her or question her abilities.

Alice kidnaps Col. Kane, who immediately recognizes his now-grown daughter, and uses him to gain access to a military base near Gotham City. She seizes chemical weapons from the base and intends to kill everyone in the city by dispersing them from an aircraft. During her final battle with Alice, Batwoman pushes her from the aircraft and Alice falls into Gotham Bay. Batwoman believes Alice to be dead.

The Gotham Police, however, never recover a body. Alice's final words implied that Col. Kane was her father. Taking Alice's blood spatters on her Batwoman costume, Kate Kane utilizes DNA testing to discover that Alice is her sister, Beth. The knowledge that her father hid Beth's possible survival from her led to a long rift in Kate and Jacob's relationship.

=== Reappearance ===
Alice reappears alive inside a sarcophagus in Batwoman (vol. 2) #17. According to Department of Extranormal Operations (DEO) Agent Cameron Chase, the Religion of Crime (ROC) was in the process of founding a cult based on Batwoman. The cult retrieved Beth's body from Gotham Harbor and placed it inside the sarcophagus. (Note: Who created the sarcophagus and how the ROC cult obtained it are not explained in the story. Mister Bones later tells Batwoman that the sarcophagus could be a living thing, or it could be technology; it might be sentient; and it might consist of billions of nanobots. All tests are inconclusive.) The sarcophagus brought Beth back to life, and kept her in suspended animation. Agent Chase, tasked by the DEO to discover the secret identity of Batwoman, uncovered the cult. All the cult members died defending the sarcophagus, which was brought back to DEO headquarters by Agent Chase. Scanning by DEO technicians revealed Beth was inside, and although she was apparently conscious the DEO did not open the sarcophagus for several months.

Now in the custody of the DEO, Beth appears traumatized by her months spent in the sarcophagus. Sometimes she's lucid, and other times reverts to her "Alice" personality. Mister Bones, director of the DEO, believes himself to be Jacob Kane's illegitimate son, (Note: Jacob Kane, too, is under this impression. Asaf later says that Bones is mentally unbalanced, and is not Jacob Kane's son. Bones, he says, came across Kane's name in a file about his real (unnamed) father, and made an unwarranted assumption.) and wants to use Beth for his own purposes. Batwoman agrees to uncover Batman's secret identity if the DEO will turn Beth over to her, destroy all its files on the Kane family, stop targeting Bette Kane, stop putting pressure on Maggie Sawyer, and agree to no longer see Batwoman as one of their agents.

Thanks to Bette Kane's electronic listening devices, Batwoman's entire family and Maggie Sawyer realize what Batwoman is up against and how high the stakes are. Col. Kane sets up the "Murder of Crows", the elite group of ex-military and intelligence operatives who trained Kate, to provide backup support for Batwoman. The Crows and Hawkfire kidnap Agent Asaf, Mister Bones' top subordinate at the DEO, and induce him to reveal the location of Beth Kane in exchange for Batwoman's help in discrediting Bones (which will allow Asaf to take over the directorship of the DEO). Hawkfire and the Crows break into the DEO safe house and finds Beth, but are captured. Batwoman and Batman agree to work together to stop Bones and free Beth. Bones, whose body generates cyanide, threatens to kill Beth rather than hand her over. Asaf shoots Bones in the head (Note: Bones is brain-damaged but survives.) and Beth is freed.

Col. Kane takes Beth to the Kane family's private island for psychiatric treatment.

=== Red Alice ===
In Batwoman (vol. 2) #36, Beth is depicted flying back to Gotham City, where she takes up residence in the mothballed family manor house on the Kane estate. She has returned to renew her relationship with Kate, having had a major breakthrough in her psychiatric treatment some weeks earlier (although she still speaks in quotations from Carroll at times). (Note: She is not completely sane, however. Kate calls her "still daffy as hell".) Clearly aware of Kate's superhero identity, she breaks into Kate's city apartment and reunites with Batwoman.

Calling herself Red Alice, Beth is introduced to Natalia Mitternacht (the vampire also known as Nocturna). Kate has abandoned her long-term relationship with Maggie Sawyer and formed one with Natalia. Beth instinctively realizes that Natalia is evil and has Kate under some sort of mental control. Beth says she wants to atone for the evil she did, and she shows familiarity with the steam-powered gun grappling hook Batwoman uses as well as incredible strength as she swings on filament lines above Gotham's city streets. When the witch Morgaine le Fey attacks an amnesiac Jason Blood in order to stop Etrigan the Demon from manifesting from Jason's body, Red Alice saves Jason from falling to his death. Red Alice later confronts Nocturna and accuses her of hypnotizing Kate. Nocturna has Batwoman attack Red Alice. Realizing she cannot defeat her sister physically, Beth offers her throat. The shock of almost being driven to kill the one person she loves more than anyone else allows Kate to break the hold Nocturna has on her. When Nocturna brags about the murders she's committed in Batwoman's name, Beth reveals that she's captured the admission on her mobile phone and live-streamed the admission to the Gotham Police Department. Afterward, Beth helps Kate deal with Natalia's emotional and sexual betrayal and successfully encourages her to reconcile with Maggie Sawyer.

Red Alice also participates in Batwoman's battle with Morgaine le Fey. Morgaine manages to recover a magical tool known as the "sorcerer's stone", which will enhance her powers dramatically. She intends to transform the world into a version of Avalon, which herself as empress. To do so, she and her demon horde ascend to a space station in outer space (the highest point above the planet). Red Alice accompanies Batwoman, Etrigan the Demon, Clayface, and Ragman aboard a Space Shuttle into orbit to stop Morgaine. The helmet of Alice's spacesuit cracks in battle, and Ragman saves her life by absorbing her soul into his costume. (Note: Ragman's costume can absorb the souls of evil-doers. Batwoman points out that although Red Alice may appear to be a hero, she has done many evil things in the past. This is why Ragman can save Beth from death.) Batwoman's team is defeated by Morgaine, and they crash back to Earth. (Note: This story was apparently published out of order in December 2014, even though the set-up story was not published until May 2015 and the conclusion until June 2015.) On a transformed Earth, Ragman restores Beth's soul to her body. The other evil souls trapped in Ragman's costume try to hold Beth back, but she resists them and screams that she wants to atone for all the wrong she has done. Red Alice then assists Batwoman's team in defeating le Fey and undoing the spell.

=== Reemergence of Alice ===
In a flashback in Batwoman (vol. 3) #7, Beth is depicted receiving further psychiatric treatment at the Weiße Kaninchen Sanatorium near Geneva, Switzerland.

The Alice persona reemerges in the "Many Arms of Death"/"Fall of the House of Kane" storyline. As depicted previously and during this story, Kate Kane comes out as a lesbian while obtaining her military education at the United States Military Academy. Depressed at the loss of her lover (who chose to keep her lesbianism a secret and remain in the Army) and her military career, Kate begins drinking heavily and taking drugs while traveling around the world and spending large sums of money. While sailing near the island of Coryana, she falls overboard and receives a severe head injury after striking a coral reef. The island's ruler, Safiyah Sohail, saves Kate's life by sewing Kate's skull shut with gold thread. The two become lovers, to the distress of Tahani, Safiyah's former partner. Coryana is a "pirate nation", providing tax havens, untraceable bank accounts, freedom of movement for arms dealers, and more, none of which worries Kate. Unwittingly, Kate becomes an asymptomatic carrier for a deadly bacterium found on the reefs on which she was injured; this bacterium causes a disease which ravages Coryana's fox population. To protect Kate, Safiyah scapegoats a troublesome man on the island, accusing him of releasing the plague, and has him killed. Kate is horrified and, after a brief fight with Safiyah and Tahani (now known by the codename "Knife"), leaves Coryana.

Years later, Batman asks Batwoman to help break the "Many Arms of Death", a terrorist organization. Batwoman learns that Beth is missing from the Weiße Kaninchen Sanatorium, and assumes Safiyah has her. (Note: In Batwoman (vol. 3) #15, readers learn that Kate realized after the fact that Elder, a high-ranking member of The Many Arms of Death, was at Beth's psychiatric hospital during one of Kate's visits six months prior; however, when Beth was kidnapped from the hospital, Kate initially chose to believe it was Safiyah and not Knife who was responsible.) Following a clue left by Safiyah, Batwoman travels to the long-abandoned Kane house in Brussels. Safiyah is there, but denies kidnapping Beth. She reveals that getting Batwoman to Belgium was a ruse to get her away from prying eyes and eavesdropping equipment. Safiyah reveals that Knife has betrayed them both, kidnapping Beth and using drugs to force her Alice personality to reemerge. Alice has subsequently taken over the Many Arms of Death, and plans to destroy Gotham City by unleashing thousands of deadly disease-carrying bats. Batwoman destroys the bats by trapping them in her airship and then initiating its self-destruction. Batwoman manages to further mitigate the damage of the attack with the help of her mission partner Julia Pennyworth, who synthesizes an aerosolized vaccine and disperses it over Gotham from the duo's secondary airship. As Batman (summoned by Julia) attempts to subdue Alice, Batwoman fights him off while arguing that Alice belongs with her and not in Arkham Asylum. She convinces him that family (Alice is Bruce Wayne's cousin, too) is more important. He allows her to keep control of Alice, although Batwoman's relationship with Batman becomes strained.

Three months after being rescued from Knife, Beth (sane once more now that the drugs are out of her system) is living with Kate in Kate's Gotham apartment. Somewhat psychologically and physically incapacitated by the drugs, she is cared for by Kate and Julia Pennyworth. The "Alice" persona is now theorized to be something magical implanted in Beth by the Religion of Crime, not induced by trauma. She receives outpatient therapy from a woman with a top hat (the comic implies this is the magical superheroine Zatanna).

In the story "Disinformation Campaign", part of the "Fear State" crossover storyline, Beth is still dealing with controlling her Alice persona. (Note: Possibly due to an error, the story refers to Beth's villainous persona as Red Alice instead of Alice.) In order to discover information about Seer, an "Anti-Oracle" figure spreading misinformation throughout Gotham during the larger crisis, Beth works alongside her sister, disguising herself as Alice to infiltrate a gathering of the Religion of Crime in an attempt to recruit those followers to find Seer. Though this recruitment fails, the twins still identify the location of Seer; Kate relays this information to Nightwing and Oracle. During the mission, Beth has an interior conversation with her Alice persona, and comes to terms with keeping her under control and accepts that, for better or worse, Alice is now a part of her for good.

Under her Alice persona once again, Beth was believed dead following a fall from mountains northwest of Gotham City during a confrontation with Kate. She resurfaced and assumed the role of Batwoman herself, but following her murder of several members of the Religion of Crime, she was committed to a Greek psychiatric facility by Kate.

== Other versions ==
Red Alice also appears in the comic book Batwoman: Future's End. Set five years into a potential future, Batwoman has become a vampire. Red Alice joins with Clayface, Jason Blood/Etrigan the Demon, and Ragman to try to stop her. During the battle, Batwoman kills Jason and Clayface. Red Alice fends off Batwoman's attacks using technology given to her by Bruce Wayne, and then reluctantly and tearfully kills her sister by driving a wooden stake through her heart.

== Other appearances ==
Beth Kane appears several times in Batwoman stories in cameos and other minor roles.

- Batwoman dreams of the child Beth and the adult Alice after she injects herself with Scarecrow's fear-toxin.
- When Batwoman is poisoned by the villain Wolf Spider, she hallucinates about Beth as a child and as Alice.
- Batwoman envisions a dead, skeletal Beth as she motivates herself to work harder at building her strength and fighting skills.
- Beth has a cameo in Batwoman's memories about her childhood at Kane Estate.
- While under the influence of Scarecrow's improved fear toxin, Batwoman has a hallucination in which the child Beth is killed by a warped version of the adult Alice. Beth appears in a flashback as Batwoman thinks about her family in an attempt to break the toxin's hold on her.
- A young Beth appears in one of Batwoman's memories about a time when Kate changed her Halloween costume to a mummy so Beth, despite having a broken wrist, would feel comfortable trick-or-treating.
- A young Beth appears in one of Batwoman's visions.

== Characterization ==
Alice is 24 years of age when she makes her first appearance. She suffers from a psychosis in which she presents a personality based on the fictional Lewis Carroll character, Alice, and speaks in quotations from Alice novels and stories. She is depicted as having chalk-white skin, short and wavy blonde hair, red nails and lips, and using heavy black mascara and eye-liner. She dresses in white, pseudo-Victorian fashion with a low décolletage and dress cut away in front to expose her thigh-high stockings and garter. The Alice personality's speech balloons are black with white borders. The text is also white, as well as serif transitional, partly italicized, and in upper and lower case. This indicates her psychosis. The Beth personality's speech balloons are white with black, sans-serif, all-caps text. This is the same style used by all other characters in the comic, which represents her lucidity. Alice is usually armed with one or more handguns, sometimes carries sharp-edged weapons such as razor blades and knives, and has an acquired immunity to many poisons and chemical weapons. She has extensive knowledge of a wide range of chemicals, drugs, hallucinogens, and poisons.

Red Alice has a similar appearance to Alice, although the right side of her head is shaved. She dressed in roughly the same pseudo-Victorian costume (although without the long dress in the rear), but her clothing is now colored burgundy. Her makeup is also different. She now sports a spray-painted purplish-red domino mask around her eyes. Red Alice exhibits familiarity with a number of gadgets and weapons used by Batwoman, as well as the physical strength and dexterity needed to use them.

Under the influence of Tahani's drugs, Alice appears similar to the way she looked in her first appearance. She wears a simplified, tailored short dress with bodice and lace-up thigh boots. Her hair is no longer shaved on one side of her head, but she continues to paint her lips and nails red. To depict her insanity, her speech balloons are either black or deep red and outlined in white. She also no longer speaks in Lewis Carroll quotations.

== In other media ==
=== Television ===
Rachel Skarsten as Beth Kane/Alice in Batwoman.

- Alice appears in Batwoman, portrayed by Rachel Skarsten while her younger self is portrayed by Ava Sleeth. This version was presumed dead after a car accident, subsequently being rescued and held captive by August Cartwright, who wants her to be a companion for his disfigured son Jonathan "Mouse" Cartwright. In addition, Jacob Kane's wife Catherine Hamilton-Kane used DNA analysts and the skull fragments of a deer to make Jacob think that Beth is dead. Additionally, Alice was abused by August's mother Mabel, whom she referred to as the Queen of Hearts. After successfully escaping from August, Beth hid in one of the ships and was briefly taken in by Safiyah Sohail. Growing up, she becomes Alice, forms the Wonderland Gang, and seeks revenge against her father for abandoning her. In the pilot episode, Alice meets her twin sister, Kate who quickly realizes that Alice is her twin sister during an event when crows operative Sophie Moore was abducted. Kate became Batwoman where she rescued Sophie and prevented the detonation of a bomb at a viewing event, but Alice got away. After giving a cryptic call to Jacob from his apartment at the time he was at a gala hosted by Tommy Elliot, she saves Batwoman by knocking out Tommy as she wanted her alive for now. Catherine later finds playing cards left by Alice in her bedroom and begs Jacob to deal with her despite his concerns that she might be Beth. Later, Alice crashed the gala, poisoning and killing Catherine. After briefly visiting Mouse in ICU disguised as a Crows agent, Alice learns about another Beth on Earth-Prime. While Kate was able to give Mary's blood to the alternate Beth and lingers by a trapped Alice, the alternate Beth is sniped enabling Alice to feel better and knock out Kate. After catching August, Alice leaves him for Kate who confesses to Kate and Jacob about what he did. Subsequently, Alice and Mouse are incarcerated at Arkham Asylum, forming an alliance with Tommy Elliot.
  - Skarsten also plays the Earth-99 counterpart of Beth in the crossover event "Crisis on Infinite Earths".
  - Kate later encounters a similar Beth (also portrayed by Skarsten) on Earth-Prime, displaced from her now non-existent reality, where she is shocked to learn of her doppelganger's villainy and even briefly assumes Alice's identity in an attempt to save Kate. After Mouse ends up in Crows custody under heavy guard in their ICU, Alice and the alternate Beth start to develop severe headaches. This Beth reveals she was not separated from her family and later went on to get a master's degree in astrophysics. This Beth was later sniped and killed by August Cartwright who mistook her for Alice.

=== Film ===
Beth Kane makes a non-speaking cameo appearance in a flashback in Batman: Bad Blood.
