= List of Infinity Inc. members =

Infinity, Inc. is a team of superheroes that appear in comic books published by DC Comics.

The team has existed in three distinct iterations. These roster lists are of the members during each of those incarnations.

The codenames listed under "Character" are those used during the time frame of the particular iteration. Characters with more than one codename for that period have them listed chronologically and separated by a slash (/). Bolded names in the most recent iteration published are the current team members.

"First appearance" is the place where the character first appeared as a member of a particular iteration. It is not necessarily the first appearance of the character in print, nor the story depicting how the character joined the team.

All information is listed in publication order first, then alphabetical.

== Original roster ==
This roster covers the iteration of the team that appeared during the 1980s created by Roy Thomas and Dann Thomas.

Character	Real name	First appearance	Notes
Fury	Lyta Trevor-Hall	Wonder Woman #300 (February 1983)	Founding member.; Apparent death in JSA #80 (February 2006).
Brainwave Jr. / Brainwave	Henry King Jr.	All-Star Squadron #24 (August 1983)	Founding member.; Son of Brain Wave; Later leader of the Legion of Doom.
Jade	Jennifer-Lynn Hayden	All-Star Squadron #25 (September 1983)	Daughter of Alan Scott.; Later member of: Blood Pack; Outsiders; Justice League of America; Killed in Rann/Thanagar War: Infinite Crisis Special #1 (April 2006).; Resurrected at the end of the Blackest Night series (2010).
Northwind	Norda Cantrell	All-Star Squadron #25 (September 1983)	Founding member.
Nuklon	Albert Rothstein	All-Star Squadron #25 (September 1983)	Founding member.; Godson of Al Pratt and grandson of Cyclotron.; Later member of; Justice League of America; Justice Society of America; Suicide Squad
Obsidian	Todd Rice	All-Star Squadron #25 (September 1983)	Son of Alan Scott.; Later member of; Justice League of America; Justice Society of America
Silver Scarab	Hector Hall	All-Star Squadron #25 (September 1983)	Founding member.; Son of Carter Hall and Shiera Sanders Hall.; Later member of the Justice Society of America (as Doctor Fate).; Apparent death in JSA #80 (February 2006).
Power Girl	Karen Starr	All Star Comics #58 (January/February 1976)	Founding member.; Former and later member of the Justice Society of America.; Former member of the "Super Squad".; Later member of: Justice League Europe; Suicide Squad; Sovereign Seven; Birds of Prey
Huntress	Helena Wayne	All Star Comics #69 (December 1977)	Founding member.; Daughter of Batman and Catwoman.; Former member of the Justice Society of America.; Crisis on Infinite Earths #12 (March 1986) retconed her out of continuity.
Star-Spangled Kid / Skyman	Sylvester Pemberton	Action Comics #40 (September 1941)	Founding member and leader.; Former member of: Seven Soldiers of Victory; All-Star Squadron; Justice Society of America; "Super Squad"; Apparent death in Infinity Inc. #51 (June 1988).
Mister Bones	Unknown	Infinity Inc. #14 (July 1985)	Former leader of Helix.; Later director of the D.E.O.
Doctor Midnight	Beth Chapel	Infinity Inc. #21 (December 1985)	Apparent death in Eclipso #13 (November 1993).
Hourman	Rick Tyler	Infinity Inc. #21 (December 1985)	Son of Rex Tyler.; Later member of the Justice Society of America.
Wildcat	Yolanda Montez	Crisis on Infinite Earths #7 (September 1985)	Goddaughter of Ted Grant.; Apparent death in Eclipso #13 (November 1993).

== Second roster ==
This roster covers the iteration of the team that appears during the series 52.

Character	Real name	First appearance	Notes
Everyman	Hannibal Bates	52 #17 (August 30, 2006)	Founding member.; Apparently killed by Black Canary in Green Arrow/Black Canary Wedding Special #1 (November 2007).
Fury	Erik Storn	52 #17 (August 30, 2006)	Founding member.
Nuklon/Double Trouble	Gerome McKenna	52 #17 (August 30, 2006)	Founding member.; Killed by his evil double in Infinity Inc. vol. 2, #12 (October 2008).
Skyman	Jacob Colby	52 #17 (August 30, 2006)	Founding member.; Replaced by teammate Everyman for an unknown amount of time, revealed deceased in 52 #38 (January 24, 2007).
Starlight/Vaporlock	Natasha Irons	52 #17 (August 30, 2006)	Niece of John Henry Irons.; Founding member.
Trajectory	Eliza Harmon	52 #17 (August 30, 2006)	Founding member.; Killed by Blockbuster in 52 #21 (September 27, 2006).
Matrix	Sierra (last name unknown)	52 #25 (October 25, 2006)	
Jade	Nicki Jones	52 #29 (November 22, 2006)	

== Third roster ==
This roster was featured in Infinity Inc. Vol. 2.

Character	Real name	First appearance	Notes
Steel	John Henry Irons	Adventures of Superman #500 (June 1993)	Founding member
Starlight/Vaporlock	Natasha Irons	Infinity Inc. vol. 2, #1 (November 2007)	Niece of John Henry Irons.; Founding member.
Amazing Woman	Erik Storn/Erika Storn	Infinity Inc. vol. 2, #3 (November 2007)	Founding member.; Killed by Codename: Assassin in Superman's Pal, Jimmy Olsen Special #2 (October 2009).
Mercy/Vanilla	Mercedes "Mercy" Graves	Detective Comics #735 (August 1999)	
Empathy	Lucia	Infinity Inc. vol. 2, #5 (March 2008)	
