= DC Next Level =

2025 American comic book line

Publication information
- Publisher: DC Comics
- Genre: Superhero
- Publication date: March 2026 – present

DC Next Level is an ongoing American comic book line published by DC Comics, as part of the DC All In relaunch.

== Publication history ==
DC Next Level was announced by publisher DC Comics in 2025 at New York Comic Con, as the next publishing initiative. It would launch in March 2026 with several new series putting a focus on lesser-known superheroes. It is described as the "second act" to the All In saga; the "first act" ending with the finale of the DC K.O. event.

== List of comics ==
=== Ongoing series ===
| Title | Issues | Creative team | | | Debut date | Conclusion date |
| Title | Issues | Writer(s) | Artist(s) | Colorist | Debut date | Conclusion date |
|---|---|---|---|---|---|---|
| Batwoman (vol. 4) | #1– | Greg Rucka | DaNi | Matt Hollingsworth | March 18, 2026 | TBA |
| Lobo (vol. 4) | #1– | Skottie Young | Jorge Corona | Jean-François Beaulieu | March 18, 2026 | TBA |
| Deathstroke: The Terminator | #1– | Tony Fleecs | Carmine Di Giandomenico | Ivan Plascencia | March 18, 2026 | TBA |
| Zatanna (vol. 4) | #1– | Jamal Campbell | | | April 29, 2026 | TBA |
| Barbara Gordon: Breakout | #1– | Mariko Tamaki | Amancay Nahuelpan | Tamra Bonvillain | May 13, 2026 | TBA |
| The Doom Patrol | #1– | Darcy Van Poelgeest | Niko Henrichon | | September 2, 2026 | TBA |
| Legion of Super-Heroes (vol. 9) | #1– | Joshua Williamson | Hayden Sherman | Tamra Bonvillain | September 2, 2026 | TBA |
| Teen Titans (vol. 7) | #1– | Kyle Higgins | Daniele Di Nicuolo | Marcelo Costa | September 2, 2026 | TBA |
| The Demon (vol. 4) | #1– | James Harren | | Dave Stewart | October 7, 2026 | TBA |
| Batman: Shadow of the Bat (vol. 2) | #1– | Deniz Camp | Javier Rodríguez | | February 24, 2027 | TBA |
| Static (vol. 2) | #1– | Cody Ziglar | Diego Olortegui | TBA | February 24, 2027 | TBA |

=== Limited series ===
| Title | Issues | Creative team | | | Debut date | Conclusion date |
| Title | Issues | Writer | Artist | Colorist | Debut date | Conclusion date |
|---|---|---|---|---|---|---|
| The Fury of Firestorm | #1–15 | Jeff Lemire | Rafael De Latorre | Marcelo Maiolo | April 8, 2026 | TBA |
| The Deadman | #1–12 | W. Maxwell Prince | Martín Morazzo | Chris O'Halloran | June 3, 2026 | TBA |
| Jonah Hex and the Shadow of Death | #1–6 | Michael Walsh | | | October 7, 2026 | TBA |
| The Swamp Thing: Hallowed Ground | #1–6 | Steve Foxe | Riccardo Federici | TBA | February 24, 2027 | TBA |

=== One-shots ===
| Title | Creative team | | | Release date |
| Title | Writer(s) | Artist | Colorist | Release date |
|---|---|---|---|---|
| Next Level: One Shot | Gerry Duggan | Fernando Blanco | Jordie Bellaire | August 26, 2026 |
