= Gianandrea Fabbro =

Italian motorbike designer

Gianandrea Fabbro is an Italian motorcycle designer and a senior designer for Ducati motorcycles in Bologna Italy. He gained notoriety when he was given the responsibility to design the next generation of Ducati's Superbike line, the 1098, after Pierre Terblanche's 999 failed to gain the popularity and success of the iconic 916 designed by Massimo Tamburini.

== Ducati 1098 Design ==
In 2006 Ducati decided to go back to the 1994 roots, and the design of the 916, while still keeping the 1098 modern for many years. Fabbro was given the task of designing the 1098 while he was still Terblanche's junior.

In an interview about the development of the 1098 Fabbro downplayed his role in the success of the 1098 design when he said “I have my dreams and take care of the creative. Other people work on different parts of the bike. My creative department are closely connected to the technical department. Part of the success of a bike is its technical specs. It is always like this.”

== Ducati 1199 Design ==
After the launch of 1098, Ducati started working on its successor Ducati 1199 Panigale. The project was code-named 0801. The company started an internal contest for the job of designing the new Ducati sport bike. Three Ducati designers were chosen to compete, and two of the designs were developed into full-size mock-ups. Fabbro's design won the contest.

In an interview, Fabbro admits that he made the first drawings of what would become Ducati 1199 at the end of 2006, without knowing about the new project. “The first design was for fun! I knew there was no new bike happening but my dream was to make something very modern, compact and technical in design. The first sketch took me one afternoon. It was a pencil drawing so it was easy to erase it as I went along." He was awarded the 2014 Compasso d'Oro for the design.
