= Joseph Bennett (Victoria cricketer) =

Australian cricketer

Personal information
- Full name: Joseph Bennett

Domestic team information
- Years: Team
- 1867: Victoria
- Source: Cricinfo, 3 May 2015

Joseph Bennett was an Australian cricketer. He played one first-class cricket match for Victoria in 1867.

== See also ==
- List of Victoria first-class cricketers
