= Joseph Bennet =

- Born: 1629; Warbleton (baptism), Sussex, England
- Died: November 1707; Hastings (burial), Sussex, England
- Occupation: Nonconformist Minister
- Spouse: Elizabeth Cooke
- Children: 4s, 1d
- Parent(s): Joseph Bennet (?1600-1635), Anne Lord/Bennet

Joseph Bennet (1629–1707) was a nonconformist minister in the southern English country of Sussex. He acquired a reputation as a powerful preacher.

Bennet gained admiration for staying with his parishioners for more than twenty years after being formally sacked from his ministerial post over doctrinal differences, even after his officially appointed successor to the living in Sussex abandoned the community when it was struck by plague in 1665.

== Life ==
=== Early years ===
Joseph Bennet was baptised in 1629. His father, also called Joseph Bennet, was the rector or curate at Warbleton in the heart of east Sussex and his wife, born Anne Lord, whose father was also rector of Warbleton.

However, the elder Joseph Bennet died in 1635 and the boy grew up under the supervision of his uncle at nearby Brightling. He attended Tonbridge Grammar School approximately 20 miles (35 km) to the north. In the year of his sixteenth birthday, on 30 June 1645 Bennet became a member of St John's College, Cambridge. His status at Cambridge as a sizar indicates that he received financial support in the form of a bursary or scholarship, probably in return for domestic duties of some sort. Disruptive context for his student career was provided by the English Civil War, an exceptionally bloody conflict which climaxed on a cold January afternoon in 1649 with the execution of the king. Bennet emerged from Cambridge in 1649/50 with a BA degree. His first job on graduating was as a family chaplain to Sir John Wollaston of Highgate.

His uncle's ambition for Bennet was that he should become the incumbent minister for the parish of Brightling, a post that was thought to be within the uncle's gift. However, a temporary minister appointed before Bennet was able to take over refused to quit. Bennet moved in as minister for the parish at Brightling only in 1658. By that time he had gained a reputation as a preacher, notably at Hooe and Burwash nearby.

=== Restoration years ===
Regime change came to England in May 1660 with the restoration of a king. The authorities quickly launched a sustained programme intended to try and discredit and reverse the failed republican experiment and to minimize the risk of a resurgence in puritan extremism. Politicians in England had increasingly, since 1536, treated the church as a branch of the state, and they now legislated accordingly. The 1662 Act of Uniformity imposed a standard approved set of structures for church services and other rituals. Joseph Bennet, in defiance of the urgings of kinsfolk and fellow clergy in adjacent parishes, became one of more than 2,000 clerics who refused to accept the requirements of The Act, and on 23 February 1662 (new calendar) he was ejected from his clerical living.

Instead of relocating, Joseph nevertheless remained in Brightling where it seems he had a good network of friends and relations. He opened a school, probably across the road from the church itself, which flourished until 1665. Meanwhile, he was replaced as rector of Brightling by his uncle, John Lord.

1665 was significant for Joseph Bennet for several reasons. A particularly savage outbreak of plague came to England. Brightling was badly hit and Joseph Lord, his successor as rector, fled to escape the infection. Bennet took a more fatalistic view, remaining in the little town and ministering to the townsfolk who "died in great numbers". Meanwhile, church ministers such as Joseph Bennet who had refused to accept the 1662 Act of Uniformity were being officially stigmatised as nonconformists.

Bennet was faced, in 1665, with another statute, the Five Mile Act / Nonconformists Act, forbidding "nonconforming" clergy from living within five miles of the parish from which they had been expelled. Well supported by friends and well respected locally because of his selfless conduct during the plague year, Bennet's presence generally went unreported. He appears to have remained active in the town despite the new act, reopening his school to pupils at his home after the plague outbreak subsided, and remaining in Brightling for more than twenty years. Early in 1672 the king issued a Declaration of Indulgence in order to try and apply a more tolerant approach to religious observance, but the king was obliged by a recalcitrant parliament to reverse his position in 1673. Bennet was licensed to work as a presbyterian teacher at his house in 1672, but the license was later revoked and sources are understandably vague on the extent of his teaching work at Brightling during the subsequent period. On several occasions he found himself before the archdeaconry court at Lewes, but was always "rescued" by "friends".

Sources imply mild incredulity as to how Bennet managed to support his growing family. Some of his scholars boarded and there may have been additional rent from other lodgers. The historian Edmund Calamy, who knew Bennet's son, writes that "his motto, was, God's good providence be mine inheritance, which was answered to him; for when his family was increased he was surprisingly provided for, so that though he never abounded, he never was in any distressing want."

=== New reign ===
A new reign brought heightened political tensions. In 1685 he faced accusations of high treason after preaching at a service held (prematurely) to celebrate the success of the Duke of Monmouth's Rebellion against the king. It later became clear that the rebellion had been crushed before the rebels had left Somerset, and Bennet avoided prosecution only through the intercession of "influential friends". With the passage of the Toleration Act two years later Joseph Bennet moved to the village of Burwash. He still kept a school, and also preached regularly to a congregation in Hellingly some 12 miles (20 km) to the south-west along the road towards Eastbourne.

=== 1688 and beyond ===
Further regime change arrived with the Dutch invasion in 1688. The new king's preference for religious toleration (though not in respect of Roman Catholics) began to catch on with many members of the political class: nonconformist preachers no longer operated subject to official suspicion. From 1690 Joseph Bennet received an annual cash grant from a Common Fund set up by London (religious) "dissenters" to "assist impecunious ministers". He moved again in 1696, this time to Hastings, still in the county of Sussex, but now on its south coast. Here he continued to look after a presbyterian congregation. However, towards the end of his life, memory loss and blindness forced him to retire.

== Family ==
Joseph Bennet married Elizabeth Cooke on 3 April 1665. Her father was the vicar of Mountfield. The marriage produced five recorded children: four sons and one daughter.

At the time he wrote his will Joseph Bennet identified three surviving sons and one daughter. Joseph Bennet's eldest son was also called Joseph Bennet. This younger Joseph Bennet (1665-1726) for many years, starting in 1708, ministered to the Presbyterian congregation of Old Jewry in central London.

Joseph Bennet, the subject of this entry, died in 1707 leaving a widow.
