= Joseph L. Bennett =

American politician

Joseph L. Bennett (fl. 1830s, died October 20, 1848) was an early settler of Montgomery County, Texas, who served as lieutenant colonel in the Battle of San Jacinto and the Somervell Expedition. He later served in the Texas House of Representatives from 1838 to 1840.

Arriving in Texas in 1834, Joseph L. Bennett served as Justice of the Peace in the precinct known as Viesca as early as 1837. This precinct was absorbed into the larger Montgomery County on July 8, 1837.

== Military service ==
Bennett joined the Texas Army sometime in 1836, and he mustered troops from Montgomery County and was headed for San Antonio to assist in the defense of the Alamo when he learned of its defeat. At Beason's crossing, Bennett and his troops joined those of Sam Houston and was commissioned captain on March 12.

Later with the reorganization of the Army in April 1837, Bennett was elected lieutenant colonel of Col. Sidney Sherman's Second Regiment of Texas Volunteers which comprised the left flank at the Battle of San Jacinto.

On May 27, 1837, Bennett received Houston's commission as colonel and appointment as commander of a regiment of "mounted gunmen" for the protection of the frontier.

== Texas House of Representatives ==
Bennett served in the House of Representatives of the Third and Fourth congresses of the Republic of Texas, November 5, 1838, through February 3, 1840. He represented Montgomery County as a stout supporter of the policies of Sam Houston.

== Family life ==
Bennett and his wife Elizabeth Seaborn were parents of five children.

1. Seaborn J Bennett (abt 1822–1860) married Mary Ann Epps
2. Julia Ann Bennett (1825–1855) married Joseph C. Clark
3. Frances Ann Elizabeth Bennett (1827–1899) married Benjamin Franklin Dyer
4. Seline Lilian Bennett married Henry Epps
5. Adaline Bennett married Thomas Tinnin Curry

== Death and burial desecration ==
Bennett's home as late as May 31, 1848 was in the town of Montgomery, Montgomery County but he moved later in the year and settled on his headright in Navarro and Freestone counties. He signed his will September 28, 1848 and it was opened for probate in Navarro County, October 30. Surviving him were his widow, Mrs. Elizabeth Bennett, and their children Seaborn J., Julia Ann Clark, wife of Joseph Clark, Frances F. Dyer, wife of B. F. Dwyer, Lilian and Adaline. Lilian afterward married Kenneth Curry and Adaline married Henry Epps. The Bennett home in Freestone County was situated about three miles from the present town of Streetman.

Bennett died in Freestone County on October 20, 1848. He was buried on his Headright land in the family cemetery.

In approximately 1971, the cemetery was bulldozed by the landowner at the time. Descendants of Bennett, concerned about the destruction contacted authorities. Freestone County Sheriff J.R. "Sonny" Sessions and Constable Lee Cherry visited the site shortly after the incident.

In a report written by then Sheriff of Freestone County J.R. "Sonny" Sessions, he observed the following:

"The land owners were contacted but denied any knowledge of the act. Constable Cherry returned to the scene some months later and found nothing remained, he believed the brush piles and markers had been buried as nothing found. We did not see Col. Bennett's marker which was said to be large and impressive" - J.R. "Sonny" Sessions, Sheriff

== Historical marker ==
The J.L. Bennett Homesite in Montgomery County is no longer in existence but a Texas Historical Marker has been placed near the location. Located on Texas State Highway 105, 1.5 miles east of Montgomery (just east of Walden Road).

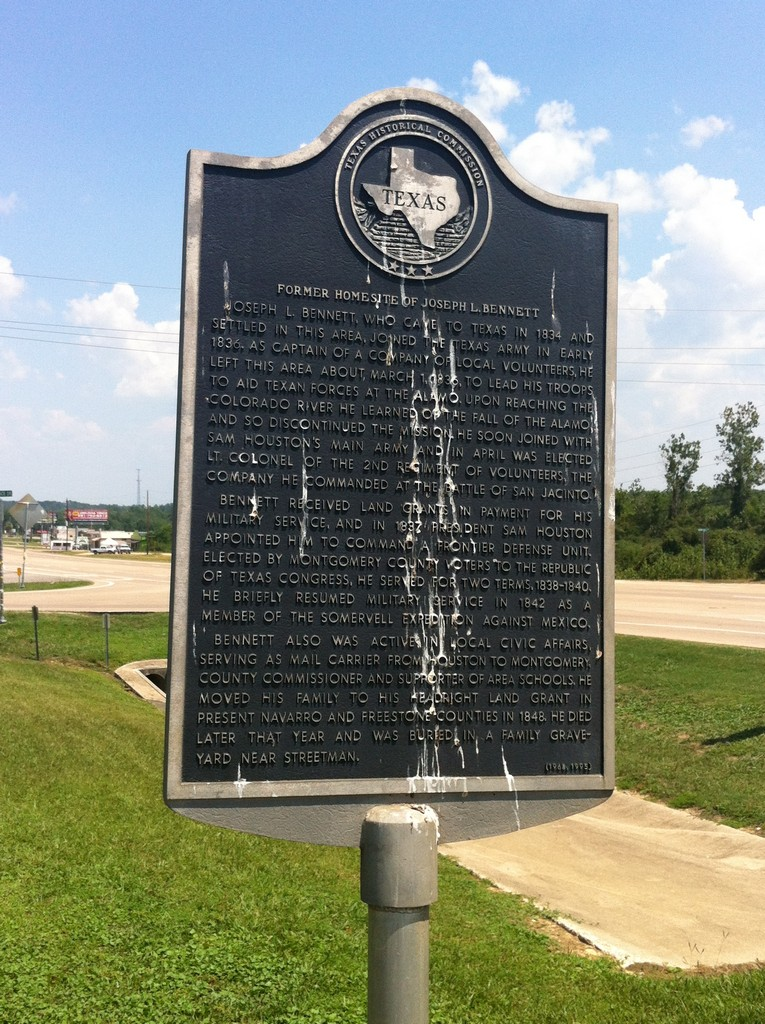

Joseph L. Bennett, who came to Texas in 1834 and settled in this area, joined the Texas army in early 1836. As captain of a company of local volunteers, he left this area about March 1, 1836, to lead his troops to aid Texan forces at the Alamo. Upon reaching the Colorado River he learned of the fall of the Alamo, and so discontinued the mission. He soon joined with Sam Houston's main army and was elected Lt. Colonel of the 2nd Regiment of Volunteers, the company he commanded at the Battle of San Jacinto. Bennett received land grants in payment for his military service, and in 1837 President Sam Houston appointed him to command a frontier defense unit. Elected by Montgomery County voters to the Republic of Texas Congress, he served for two terms, 1838-1840. He briefly resumed military service in 1842 as a member of the Somervell Expedition against Mexico. Bennett also was active in local civic affairs, serving as mail carrier from Houston to Montgomery county commissioner and supporter of area schools. He moved his family to his headright land grant in present Navarro and Freestone counties in 1848. He died later that year and was buried in a family graveyard near Streetman.
