= 52 (comics) =

1-year DC comic book series

- Cover of 52 Week 1 (May 10, 2006). Art by J. G. Jones

Publication information
- Publisher: DC Comics
- Schedule: Weekly
- Format: Limited series
- Genre: Superhero
- Publication date: May 2006 – May 2007
- No. of issues: 52
- Main character(s): Adam Strange; Animal Man; Batwoman; Black Adam; Booster Gold; Ralph Dibny; Lex Luthor; Will Magnus; Bruno Mannheim; Renee Montoya; Question; Starfire; Steel; Science Squad; Infinity, Inc.

Creative team
- Written by: Geoff Johns; Grant Morrison; Greg Rucka; Mark Waid; Keith Giffen
- Artist(s): Joe Bennett; Chris Batista; Eddy Barrows; Todd Nauck; Keith Giffen; Ruy Jose; Jack Jadson; Darick Robertson; Ken Lashley; Phil Jimenez; Dan Jurgens; Justiniano; Mike McKone; Jamal Igle; Dale Eaglesham; Covers: J. G. Jones; Alex Sinclair (colors)

Collected editions
- Volume 1: ISBN 1-4012-1353-7
- Volume 2: ISBN 1401213642
- Volume 3: ISBN 1401214436
- Volume 4: ISBN 140121486X

52 is a weekly American comic book limited series published by DC Comics that debuted on May 10, 2006, one week after the conclusion of the Infinite Crisis miniseries. The series was written by Geoff Johns, Grant Morrison, Greg Rucka, and Mark Waid, with layouts by Keith Giffen. 52 also led into a few limited series spin-offs.

52 consists of 52 issues, published weekly for one year, each issue detailing an actual week chronicling the events that took place during the missing year after the end of Infinite Crisis. The series covers much of the DC Universe, and several characters whose disparate stories interconnect. The story is directly followed by the weekly limited series Countdown to Final Crisis. It was the first weekly series published by DC Comics since the short-lived anthology Action Comics Weekly from 1988 to 1989.

== Publication history ==
The use of a weekly publication format is unusual in the North American comics industry, traditionally based upon a monthly publication. 52 and Batman Eternal (2014/2015) both hold the top position, of being the longest-published serialised weekly comic, published by a major North American publisher. The record was previously held by Action Comics Weekly. The story was originally conceived as being a chronicle of what happened in the "missing year" between the end of Infinite Crisis and the beginning of One Year Later. It would especially focus on how the world dealt with the disappearance of the "big three" heroes in the DCU, Superman, Batman, and Wonder Woman. As the series went on, it became more of a platform for which to set the stage for upcoming storylines in the DC Universe.

According to Mark Waid, some plotlines were exclusively penned by a particular writer, while other characters and stories would be "shared" between writers:

Some plot threads were passed like a baton more than others; I think all of us wrote John Henry Irons at one time, whereas the Montoya stuff was all Greg's because it was important it maintained a very specific voice, and the space stuff was all Grant's because none of us could figure out what the hell he was doing even though we enjoyed it greatly. Me, I get credit for Wicker Sue. Geoff and I shared Booster and probably collaborated more as a pair on different plot elements because we were the only two who lived in the same town.

== Back-up stories ==
=== History of the DC Universe ===
A backup story titled History of the DC Universe appears in Weeks 2 through 11, with the creative team of Dan Jurgens and Art Thibert. Reminiscent of DC's earlier History of the DC Universe limited series, in this story, Donna Troy explores the history of the DC Universe with the help of Harbinger's recording device. In the final chapter, Donna learns that she was supposed to have died instead of Jade.

=== Secret Origins ===
Weeks 12 through 51 feature Secret Origins, written by Mark Waid with a rotating team of artists.

== Plot ==
Booster Gold, who originates from the 25th century, discovers numerous events that contradict his records of history and searches for answers in Rip Hunter's bunker, which is littered with notes and photos of Gold and Skeets. Skeets gains access to Hunter's lab and realizes the photos and arrows are pointing at himself. He goes after Hunter and eventually finds him with Booster Gold. Hunter and Booster attempt to trap Skeets in the Phantom Zone, but Skeets consumes the Phantom Zone and pursues the two through time.

Ralph Dibny seeks out the helmet of Doctor Fate, which promises to revive his deceased wife Sue Dibny if he makes certain sacrifices. While preparing a spell for Nabu, Ralph learns that Felix Faust had been posing as Nabu to give Ralph's soul to the demon Neron. Neron kills Ralph, but he and Faust are trapped in the Tower of Fate by a spell that Ralph cast before he died. Ralph and Sue are reunited in death and become ghost detectives.

Lex Luthor announces the Everyman Project, a program designed to give ordinary people superpowers. Natasha Irons enrolls in the Everyman Project and joins Luthor's superhero team Infinity, Inc. Luthor deactivates the powers of most of the Everyman subjects, resulting in many of them falling to their deaths. Natasha's uncle John and the Teen Titans attack LexCorp and bring Luthor to justice with Natasha's help. Natasha is offered membership in the Teen Titans, but declines in favor of forming a new team with John.

Animal Man, Starfire, and Adam Strange are marooned on an alien planet after the events of Infinite Crisis. They are pursued by agents of Lady Styx, who are conquering planets and traveling toward Earth. The three defeat Styx with help from Lobo. Animal Man is killed in the battle, but resurrected by the aliens who gave him his powers.

Black Adam, the leader of Kahndaq, allies with several other countries against the United States. He stops when Adrianna Tomaz convinces him to use his abilities peacefully to help Kahndaq. Adam convinces Captain Marvel to give Tomaz the power of Isis. Meanwhile, the Question and Renee Montoya investigate Intergang and learn that the group is inducting children into their ranks. Adam finds Isis' crippled brother Amon among the children and shares his power with him, transforming him into Osiris.

Will Magnus is abducted and taken to Oolong Island, where Intergang and Chang Tzu force kidnapped scientists to develop weapons. The scientists activate the Four Horsemen, who kill Osiris and Isis. A grief-stricken Adam devastates Bialya, killing its entire population, before embarking on a week-long rampage across Earth. Captain Marvel convinces the Egyptian pantheon to revert Adam to Teth-Adam and changes Adam's magic word from "Shazam" to a new phrase. Adam disappears and wanders Earth while attempting to regain his powers.

The Question and Montoya train with Richard Dragon in Nanda Parbat, where Montoya learns that the Question is dying from lung cancer and wants her to replace him. After discovering a prophecy in the Crime Bible about Batwoman's death, the two join her fight against Intergang in Gotham City. When the Question's condition worsens, Montoya returns to Nanda Parbat in a failed attempt to save him. Intergang discovers Batwoman's identity and attempts to sacrifice her to fulfill the prophecy. Bruno Mannheim stabs Batwoman, but she survives and fatally wounds Mannheim.

Skeets is revealed to be Mister Mind, who has been using Skeets' body as a cocoon to metamorphose into the "Hyperfly", gaining the ability to consume time itself. Hunter and Booster escape to the end of Infinite Crisis and witness the creation of the multiverse. The Phantom Zone is restored and Mind alters events in the 52 universes, creating new histories for each. The heroes trap Mind inside Skeets and send him back in time to the beginning of the year, where he is captured by Doctor Sivana. Magnus rebuilds Skeets using a copy of his memories.

=== World War III ===
Week 50 of 52 and the four-issue World War III limited series, which was released the same week, depict the superhumans' battle with Black Adam. World War III also depicts Aquaman's transformation into the Dweller of the Depths, Martian Manhunter's change in outlook, Donna Troy's assumption of the Wonder Woman mantle, Supergirl's return to the 21st century, Jason Todd pretending to be Nightwing, and Cassandra Cain being drugged to turn evil and join Deathstroke.

== Collected editions ==
The lead stories of the series are collected, with commentary from the creators and other extras, into four trade paperbacks:

- Volume 1 (collects #1–13, 304 pages, May 2007, ISBN 1-4012-1353-7)
- Volume 2 (collects #14–26, 304 pages, July 2007, ISBN 1-4012-1364-2)
- Volume 3 (collects #27–39, 304 pages, September 2007, ISBN 1-4012-1443-6)
- Volume 4 (collects #40–52, 304 pages, November 2007, ISBN 1-4012-1486-X)

All 52 issues were also available in the 52 Omnibus hardcover (1,216 pages, November 2012, ISBN 978-1401235567).

The collection has also been made available in a two-volume edition that includes bonus material after each chapter:

- Volume 1 (collects #1–26, 584 pages, June 2015, ISBN 978-1401263256)
- Volume 2 (collects #27–52, 616 pages, January 2017, ISBN 978-1401265649)

Other connected collections include:

- 52: The Companion (224 pages, October 2007, ISBN 1-4012-1557-2)
- DC: World War III (collects 52 Week 50 and the entire four-issue World War III limited series, 128 pages, December 2007, ISBN 1-4012-1504-1)
- 52 Aftermath: The Four Horsemen (Collects #1–6, 144 pages, May 2008 ISBN 978-1401217815)
- The Question: The Five Books of Blood (collects "Crime Bible – Five Lessons of Blood" #1–5, 128 pages, June 2009, ISBN 978-1401223359)
- Wizard #184

== Spin-offs ==
Taking advantage of the popularity of the series, DC issued several series of comics based on the individual threads of 52 that began several months after 52 ended. Booster Gold (vol. 2) is an ongoing series that sees the eponymous hero and Rip Hunter travel through time to fix history as "the greatest superhero never known". The six-issue 52 Aftermath: The Four Horsemen miniseries covers the Four Horsemen's battle with Superman, Batman, and Wonder Woman. Black Adam: The Dark Age, another six-issue miniseries, follows Teth-Adam's quest to restore his powers and bring Isis back to life; it takes place between the end of 52 and Mary Marvel's corruption in Countdown to Final Crisis.

Two strands of the 52 story were taken and put together with back-ups from the new Countdown to Final Crisis story. Countdown to Adventure looks at the fate of space-travelers Adam Strange, Animal Man, and Starfire in their new roles after their journey over the course of eight issues, with a back-up story following Forerunner. Countdown to Mystery is another eight-issue series looking at the new Doctor Fate and a back-up story focusing on Eclipso.

These include:

- Booster Gold vol. 2 #1–47 – The further adventures of Booster Gold, Supernova, and Rip Hunter as they try to preserve the fractured timeline.
- Black Adam: The Dark Age #1–6 – In the aftermath of World War III, Black Adam tries to recoup his losses, for both his powers and his personal life.
- Infinity Inc. #1–12 – Steel and the remaining members of the Everyman Project team together to form a new Infinity Inc.
- 52 Aftermath: Crime Bible – Five Lessons of Blood #1–5 – The Question and Batwoman investigate crimes, leading them deeper into the Crime Bible.
- 52 Aftermath: The Four Horsemen #1–6 – Follows Superman, Batman, and Wonder Woman against the Four Horsemen.
- Metal Men #1–8 – Follows Will Magnus and the new version of the Metal Men as they battle Will's brother, David, who wants to destroy them.
- Detective Comics – Follows Batwoman and the Question.
- The Great Ten #1–9 – Follows the eponymous Chinese superteam.

== In other media ==
=== Action figures ===
In September 2006, DC Direct premiered a line of action figures based on 52. The first wave, featuring figures based on Batwoman, Isis, Booster Gold, Animal Man, and Supernova, was released in May 2007.

=== Novelization ===
Ace Books, under the imprint of the Berkley Publishing Group and published by the Penguin Group, released a novelization written by Greg Cox, with cover art by J. G. Jones and Alex Sinclair, and its design by George Brewer.

The novel primarily adapts the weekly limited series and the World War III tie-in miniseries. The novel deals with the plotlines of Montoya, the Question, Black Adam, Booster Gold, Skeets, and the 52 Earths, dropping the Luthor/Steel/Everyman Project, Ralph Dibny, and space plotlines completely and including only part of the "Science Squad" storyline, keeping in the evil geniuses and their work for Intergang but leaving out Will Magnus' ongoing plot; in his introduction, Cox explains that it was not possible to adapt all the plotlines of 52 within a novel of reasonable length. Outside of the loss of these various storylines from the book, events play out in an essentially identical manner, with most of the dialogue itself even lifted from the comics verbatim. There are some minor cosmetic changes along the way (for instance, on Week 3, Black Adam kills Intergang thug Rough House as opposed to Terra-Man), but in the final chapter, the specifics of Mister Mind's cross-time battle with Rip Hunter, Booster Gold, and Supernova are altered. The villain reveals himself in front of a gathered group of heroes in Metropolis, rather than to just Booster and Rip in the Fortress of Solitude; the rebirth of the multiverse is credited to Mister Mind's transformation, rather than the Crisis; and the weapon stolen from Steel by Booster during World War III is actually put to use against Mind, which it was not in the comic, and is the cause of his unexplained-in-the-comic shrinking.

=== Audiobook ===
In December 2007, GraphicAudio released the first half of a full cast audiobook adaptation based on the novel by Greg Cox. Like GraphicAudio's audiobook of Infinite Crisis, this spans two volumes (each 6 hours long) with 6 CDs and features a full cast, music, and sound effects. Volume 2 was released in February 2008.

Voice cast credits as follows:

- Ken Jackson : Black Adam, Skeets, Mr. Mind
- Barbara Pinolini : Renee Montoya
- Bruce Rauscher : The Question, Phantom Stranger, Dr. Cyclops, Leonard Akteon
- Colleen Delany : Isis, Wonder Woman, Superwoman
- David Coyne : Booster Gold, Bruno Mannheim, Captain Boomerang, Beefeater
- James Konicek : Clark Kent, Count Vertigo, First Beast-man
- Nanette Savard : Lois Lane, Whisper A'Daire, Zalika
- M.B. Van Dorn : Katherine Kane / Batwoman
- Michael Glenn : Osiris, Richard Dragon, Hourman, Beast Boy
- Terence Aselford : Captain Marvel, Jay Garrick, Captain Marvel Jr., Mind-Grabber Kid
- Susan Lynskey : Mary Marvel, Plastique, Madame Xanadu
- James Lewis : Nightwing, Kyle Abbot, Baron Bug, Agent Rogers, Jimmy Olsen
- Karen Carbone : Power Girl, Claudia Lanpher
- Ted Stoddard : Aristotle Rodor
- Eric Messner : Atom Smasher, Doctor Death
- Erika Rose : Amanda Waller, Natasha Irons
- Michael John Casey : Persuader, Dr. Kim, Zorrm
- Elisabeth Demery : Zatanna, Stargirl, Mallory, Veronica Cale
- Jeff Baker : Alan Scott
- Elliot Dash : Mr. Terrific, Steel
- Dylan Lynch : Waverider, Rumaan Harjavti, Electrocutioner
- Thomas Penny : Martian Manhunter, Rigoro Mortis, News Anchor, Black Lightning, Bike Boy
- Tim Carlin : Perry White, Jim Corrigan, Benny the Mover
- Cate Torre : Lady Sivana, Mildred Heiny, Yellow Peri, Carjack Lady
- Jim Lawson : Metamorpho, Louie the Mover, Fred Farrell, Panic Dad
- Arianne Parker : Firehawk, Firefighter, Kahndaqi Woman
- Christopher Graybill : T. O. Morrow, Roggra, Noose, Mirage
- Michael Replogle : Doctor Tyme, Manthrax
- Christopher Walker : Strauss, Kahndaqi Dissident, Aged Servant
- Jacinda Bronaugh : Vicki Vale, Bobbi Bobbins
- Richard Rohan : Dr. Sivana, Rip Hunter, Sabbac, Azraeuz, The Blimp
- Mort Shelby : Sobek, Wildcat, Mammoth, Tawky Tawny, Rough House

=== The Flash ===
In the CW series The Flash, the term '52' is often used as an Easter egg. For example, in the episode "Things You Can't Outrun", the Flash team opt to incarcerate criminal metahumans in "Area 52" at S.T.A.R. Labs. In the second season, inter-dimensional breaches are made between Earth-One and Earth-Two, and 52 separate portals are located.

== See also ==
- Countdown to Final Crisis
- List of DC Comics publications
- The New 52
