= Ducati 1098 =

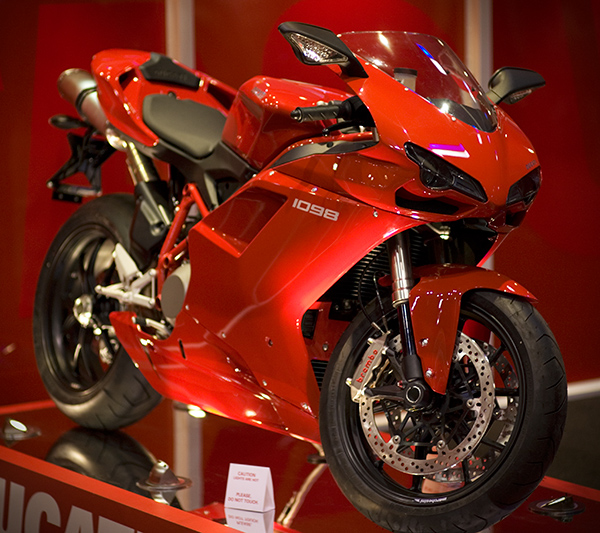
- Manufacturer: Ducati
- Also called: "Ten-nine-eight"
- Production: 2007–2009
- Predecessor: 999
- Successor: 1198
- Class: Sport bike
- Engine: 1,099–1,198 cc (67.1–73.1 cu in) 90° L-twin cylinder, 4 valve per cylinder Desmodromic, liquid cooled
- Bore / stroke: 104.0 mm × 64.7 mm (4.09 in × 2.55 in); 106.0 mm × 67.9 mm (4.17 in × 2.67 in) (1098R)
- Top speed: 173.3 mph (278.9 km/h)
- Power: 160–180 hp
- Torque: 90–99 ft·lbf
- Related: Ducati 848

The Ducati 1098 is a sport bike made by Ducati from 2007 to 2009, in three versions, the 1098, 1098S, and 1098R. The 1098 was succeeded by the 1198 in 2009, though the 1098R remained in production that year.

The 1098 shares more design elements with the older 998 than with its predecessor the 999, such as horizontally placed headlights and a non-integrated exhaust system. Another carryover from its 916/998 heritage is the single-sided swingarm. The 1098 was designed by Ducati designer, Giandrea Fabbro.

== Performance ==
The 1098/1098 S makes a manufacturer claimed 160 hp (119 kW),138 hp (103 kW) rear wheel, 90.4 lb⋅ft (123 N⋅m) torque, 77.9 lb⋅ft (106 N⋅m) rear wheel, and weighs 173 kg (381 lb). The 0-60 mph time is less than 3.0 seconds and 1/4 mile at 10.015 seconds at 143.94 mph (231.65 km/h) and top speed of 173.3 mph (279 km/h). The 1098 R, with its larger displacement 1198 cc engine, makes a manufacturer claimed 180 hp (134 kW), 99.1 lb⋅ft (134 N⋅m) torque. At the time of its release, these figures gave the 1098 the highest torque-to-weight ratio of any production sport bike ever made.

== Racing ==
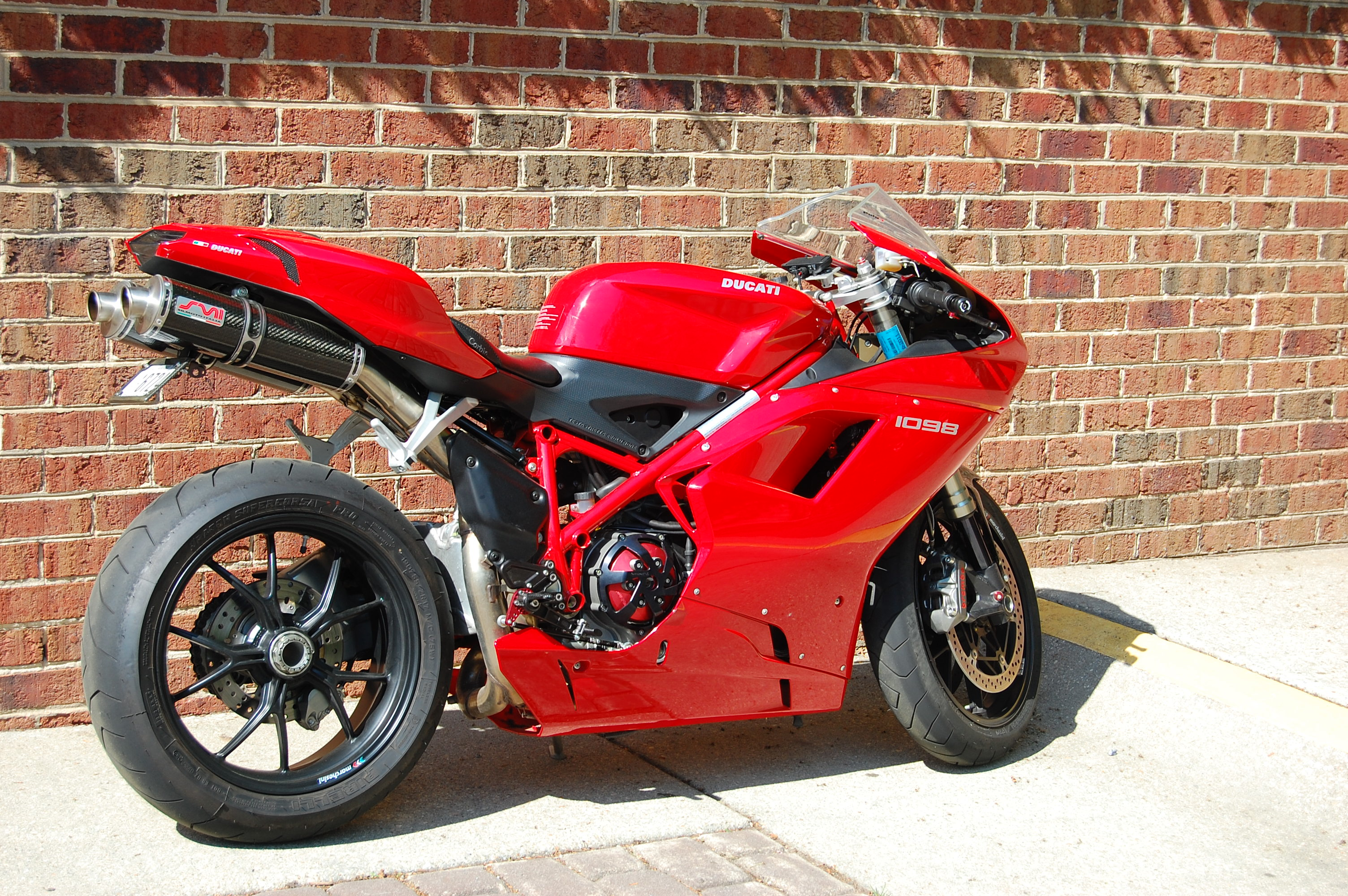
Ducati 1098

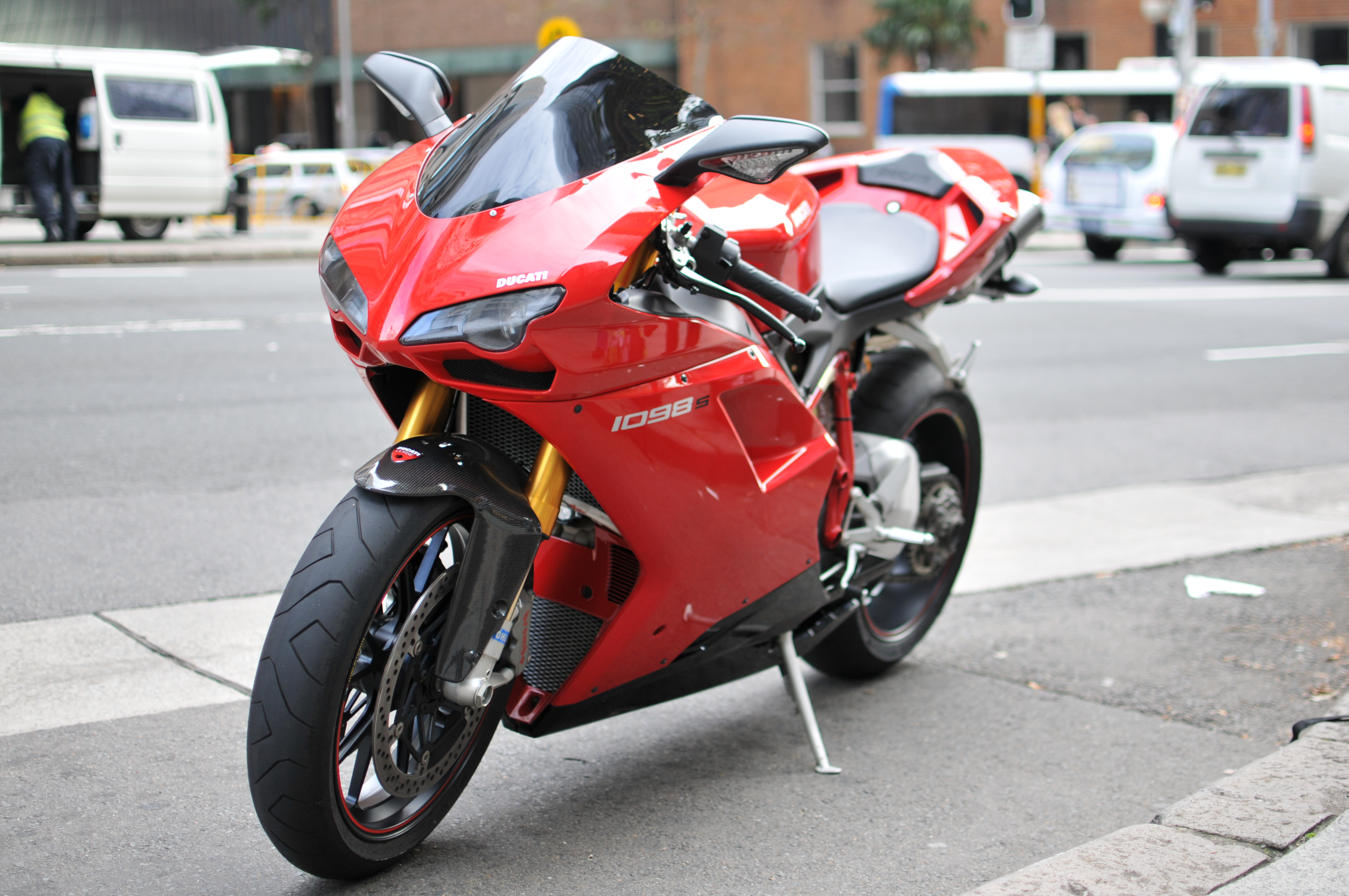
Ducati 1098 S

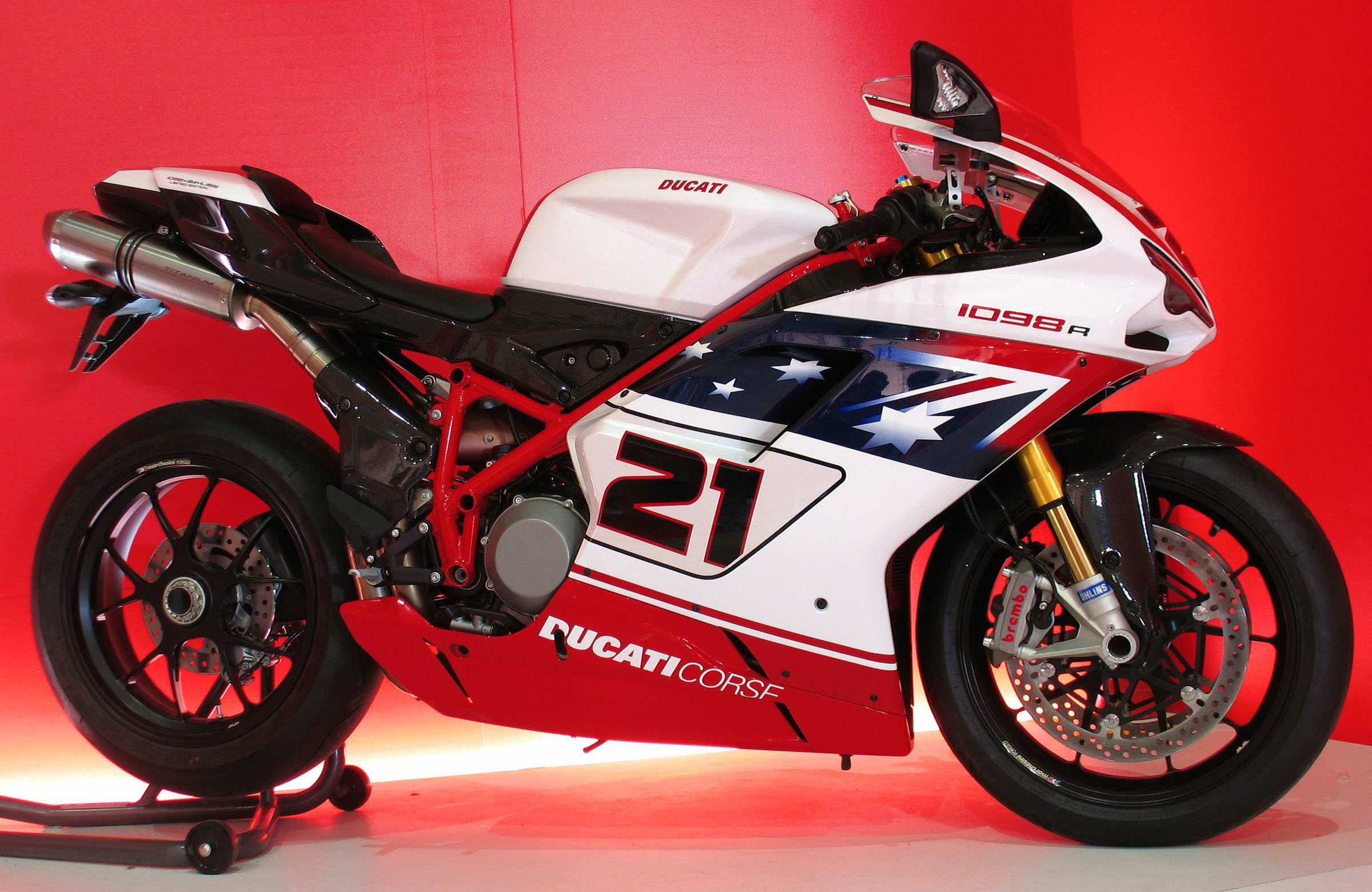
Ducati 1098 R Bayliss Limited

With the release of the 1098, Ducati created a stir not only with road riders, but also in the racing world, specifically the Superbike World Championship. In an attempt to level the playing field, WSBK regulations provide for concessions to motorcycles depending on the number of cylinders in their engine design. The fewer the cylinders, the more concessions, and with its two-cylinder V-twin design Ducati was able to capitalize on many of these concessions.

Ducati argued that the current engine was at the end of its design life (which surrendered as much as 20 hp to the competition in 2007, its last year in WSBK) and that it would be too expensive to keep the 999 competitive. The 2007 WSBK rules limited V-twin engines to 1000 cc, so Ducati effectively did not have a guarantee that the 1098 was eligible for entry in the premier class. Before releasing the 1098, Ducati lobbied the FIM to update the WSBK rules to accommodate its new bike, threatening to withdraw from WSBK competition if the rules weren't changed. Other manufacturers were not happy about racing a bike with a larger engine, especially when that bike belonged to Ducati, which has historically dominated WSBK competition, and Suzuki even threatened to withdraw if the rules were changed. Ducati prevailed when, in June 2007, the FIM announced that the engine capacity limit would increase to 1200 cc for 2008. However, this increase in displacement was not afforded without concessions on the part of Ducati. With the new 1200 cc maximum displacement for two-cylinders granted, the extra engine modifications allowed two-cylinder machines were surrendered. Engine modification rules for two-cylinder and four-cylinder machines are now parallel. Rules for three-cylinder machines remain as before.

Ducati won the 2008 and 2011 Superbike World Championship with its 1098RS, a derivative of the 1098R (Bayliss on a 1098RS and Checa on a 1198RS). The 1098RS and the 1198RS were purpose built racing versions of the 1098R. In addition to the two World Superbike Championships it also won the 2008 British Superbike Championship. The RS Version was not intended nor legal for road use and was never made available for sale to the general public. It featured a number of high performance items; more aggressive camshafts, high compression pistons, a larger capacity fuel tank that extended under the seat, steering damper remounted ahead of the larger fuel tank, a large capacity and pressurized radiator, a servo motor in the injection system, a longer and more stiff swingarm, a flat rocker arm for the rear suspension that allowed for utilization of the full range of travel, adjustable triple clamps for variations in rake and trail, a massively upgraded electronics package for throttle response, power delivery, traction and wheelie control, weather settings and other high performance upgrades. Ducati have won 17 World Championships since the Superbike World Championship was established in 1988. Xavier Siméon won the 2009 FIM Superstock 1000 Cup season. Michael Rutter won the Macau Grand Prix in 2011.

== Remodelled for 2009 ==
For 2009, Ducati took the past success of the 1098 and modified it to honour a racing legend and to improve the performance of the Superbike.

Key changes include an upgrade into a 180 hp 90° L-twin "Testastretta Evoluzione" engine, and the inclusion of the Ducati Traction Control for better handling. The more common version of the bike is called "1098-09 R", which comes with the traditional Ducati red fairing, black chassis, and white sub-frame. The wheel rims are gold colored.

The main reason for Ducati to re-model this bike was to celebrate Troy Bayliss' victory in the 2008 Superbike World Championship season riding for Ducati, after which he retired. Ducati built the remodelled 1098 to salute the career of Bayliss and his three World Championships. It also allowed for Ducati to sell a few models of the 1098 in a colour scheme very similar to the one that Bayliss' bike used during his successful races in the 2008 Grand Prix, as well as his number "21" on the side. This model is suitably named "Ducati 1098 R Bayliss Limited Edition". According to Ducati, only 500 units of this new bike were manufactured. Other additions to the 1098 R Bayliss LE include carbon fibre heat shield on the exhaust and 5-spoke wheels (similar to Bayliss' original).It then went on to win a second world title with Carlos Checa in 2011.

== Reviews and awards ==
- The SWA (Supertest World Association) awarded the 1098 the "Best Bike of the Year" award for 2008
- "International Bike of the Year 2007 and 2008" by the choices of the world's moto-journal communities as well as journalists
- "Best of Show" reward in Italy and abroad
- "Best Design" and "Best Sportbike" awarded by the Motorcycle Design Association
- "Bike of the Year" 2007 award given by magazines Moto, Australian Motorcycle News and Motorrad
- "Sportbike of the Year" 2008, Cycle World

== Specifications ==
All specifications are manufacturer claimed unless noted otherwise:

	1098	1098 S	1098 R
Chassis
Frame	Tubular steel Trellis frame in ALS 450		
Wheelbase	1,430 mm (56.3 in)		
Rake	24°30' / 24,5°		
Front suspension	Showa 43 mm (1.7 in) with TiO fully adjustable upside-down fork	Öhlins 43 mm (1.7 in) fully adjustable upside-down fork with TiN	
Front wheel travel	127 mm (5.0 in)		120 mm (4.7 in)
Front brake	2 x 330 mm (13.0 in) semi-floating discs, radially mounted Brembo Monobloc calipers 4-piston, 2-pad.		
Front wheel	5-spoke in light alloy 3.5 in × 17 in (88.9 mm × 431.8 mm)	5-spoke in forged light alloy 3.5 in × 17 in (88.9 mm × 431.8 mm)	
Front tire	120/70 ZR17 (Pirelli Dragon Supercorsa Pro tire)		
Rear suspension	Progressive linkage with fully adjustable Showa monoshock. Aluminum single-sided swingarm	Progressive linkage with fully adjustable Öhlins monoshock with top-out spring. Aluminum single-sided swingarm	Progressive linkage with fully adjustable Öhlins TTXR monoshock with top-out spring. Aluminum single-sided swingarm
Rear wheel travel	127 mm (5.0 in)		
Rear brake	245 mm (9.6 in) disc, 2-piston caliper		
Rear wheel	10-spoke light alloy 6 in × 17 in (152.4 mm × 431.8 mm)	10-spoke forged light alloy 6 in × 17 in (152.4 mm × 431.8 mm)	
Rear tire	190/55 ZR17 (Pirelli Dragon Supercorsa Pro tire)		
Fuel tank capacity	15.5 L (4.1 US gal) (of which 4 L (1.1 US gal) reserve)		
Dry weight	173 kg (381 lb)	171 kg (377 lb)	165 kg (364 lb)
wet weight		199 kg (439 lb)	
Seat height	820 mm (32.3 in)		
Instruments	Digital MotoGP derived unit displaying: Speedometer, rev counter, clock, scheduled maintenance warning, warning light for low oil pressure, fuel level, oil temperature, fuel reserve, trip fuel, neutral, turn signals, average speed, average fuel consumption, remaining fuel meter, immobilizer. Ducati Data Analyser (DDA) system enabled.		
Warranty	2 years unlimited mileage		
Body colors (frame/wheels)	(Red - Red - Black) (Yellow - Racing grey - Black)	(Red - Red - Black) (Midnight Black - Red - Black)	(Red - Red - Racing Gold) (Troy Bayliss LE Paint Scheme - Red - Black)
Versions	Dual seat	Dual seat	Single seat
Engine
Type	90° L-twin cylinder, 4 valve per cylinder Desmodromic, liquid cooled		
Displacement	1,099 cc (67.1 cu in)		1,198.4 cc (73.1 cu in)
Bore x Stroke	104 mm × 64.7 mm (4.1 in × 2.5 in)		106 mm × 67.9 mm (4.2 in × 2.7 in)
Compression Ratio	12.5:1		12.8:1
Power	160 bhp (119 kW) @ 9750 rpm 138 bhp (103 kW) rear wheel		180 bhp (134 kW) @ 9750 rpm
Torque	90.4 ft⋅lbf (123 N⋅m) @ 8000 rpm 77.9 ft⋅lbf (106 N⋅m) rear wheel		99.1 ft⋅lbf (134 N⋅m) @ 7750 rpm
Fuel injection	Marelli electronic fuel injection, elliptical throttle bodies.		
Exhaust	Lightweight 2-1-2 system with catalytic converter and lambda probe. Twin stainless steel mufflers		Lightweight 2-1-2 system with catalytic converter and 2 lambda probes. Twin stainless steel and titanium mufflers
Emissions	Euro 3		
Transmission
Gearbox	6-speed constant-mesh, manual		
Ratios	1st 37/15; 2nd 30/17; 3rd 28/20; 4th 26/22; 5th 24/23; 6th 23/24		1st 37/15; 2nd 30/17; 3rd 27/20; 4th 24/22; 5th 24/23; 6th 22/25
Primary drive	Straight cut gears, Ratio 1.84:1		
Final drive	Chain; Front sprocket 15; Rear sprocket 38		
Clutch	Dry multiplate with hydraulic control		Dry multiplate with hydraulic control slipper clutch
Other

== Successor ==
The 1098 and 1098S were replaced in the Ducati lineup by the Ducati 1198 in 2009. The 1198 has more power and torque, redesigned wheels, fairing, speedometer, headlights, the addition of traction control and a few other minor changes. The 1098R no longer remains in production.

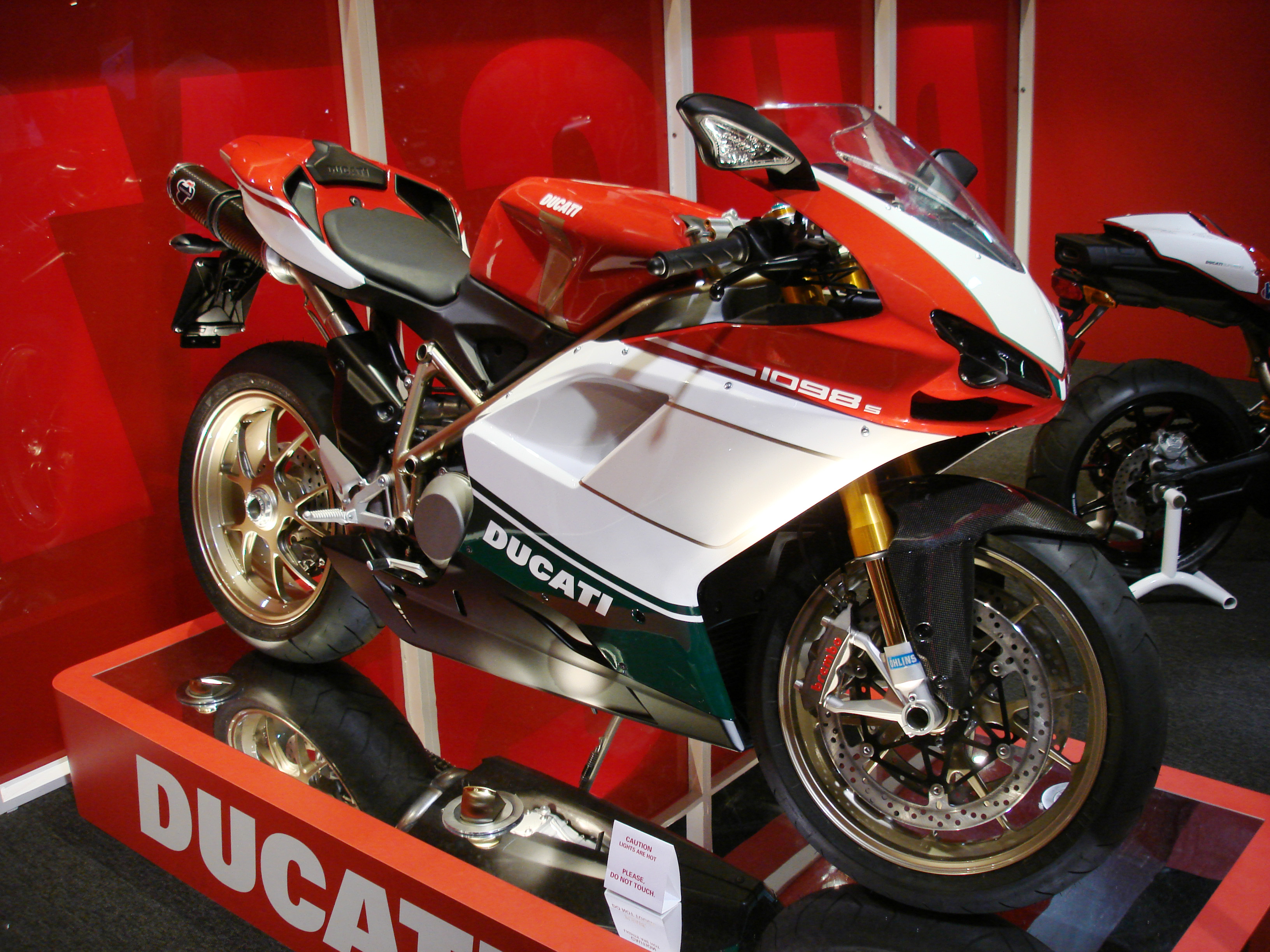
Ducati 1098 S Tricolore at International Motorcycle Show

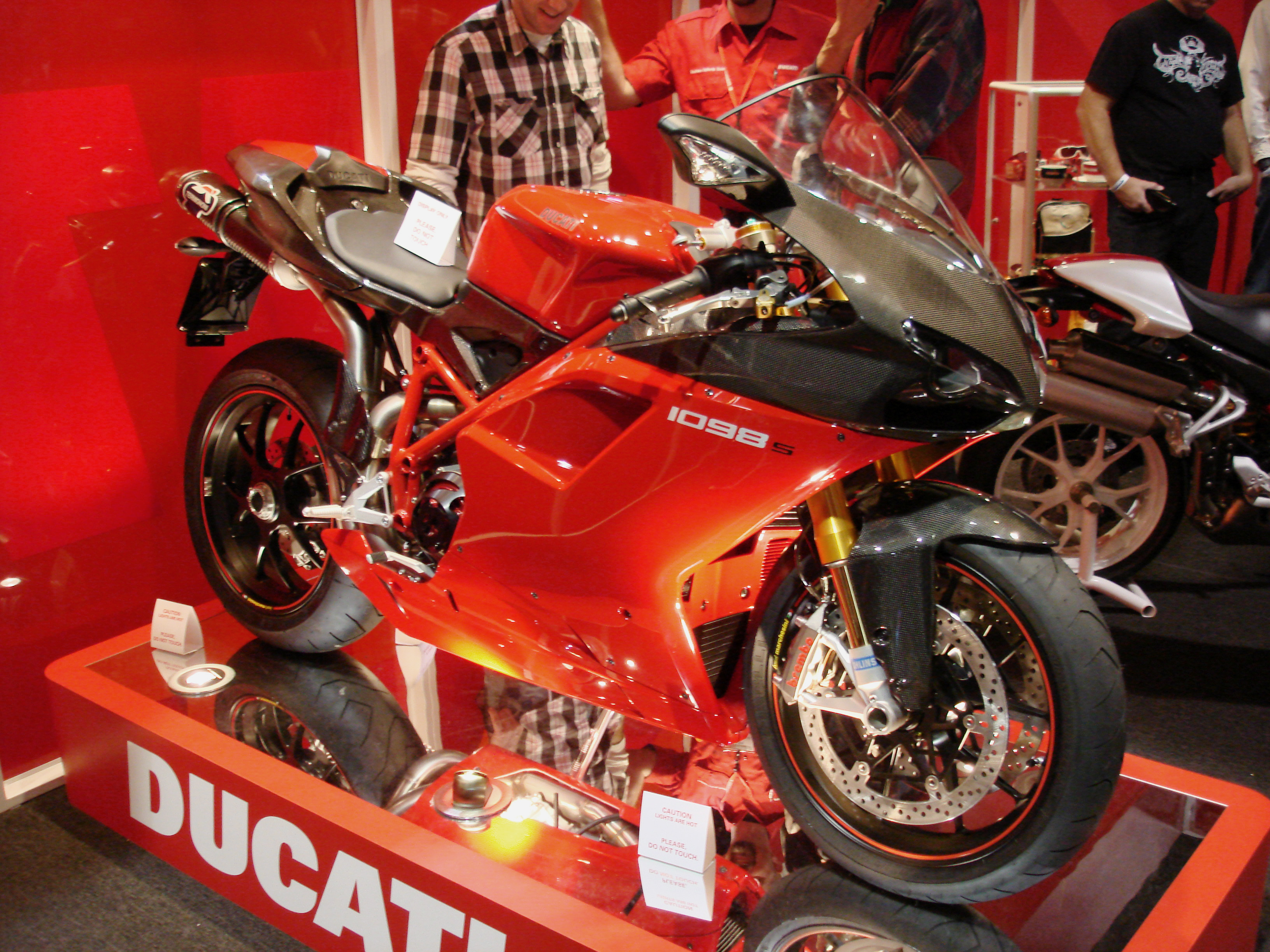
Ducati 1098 S

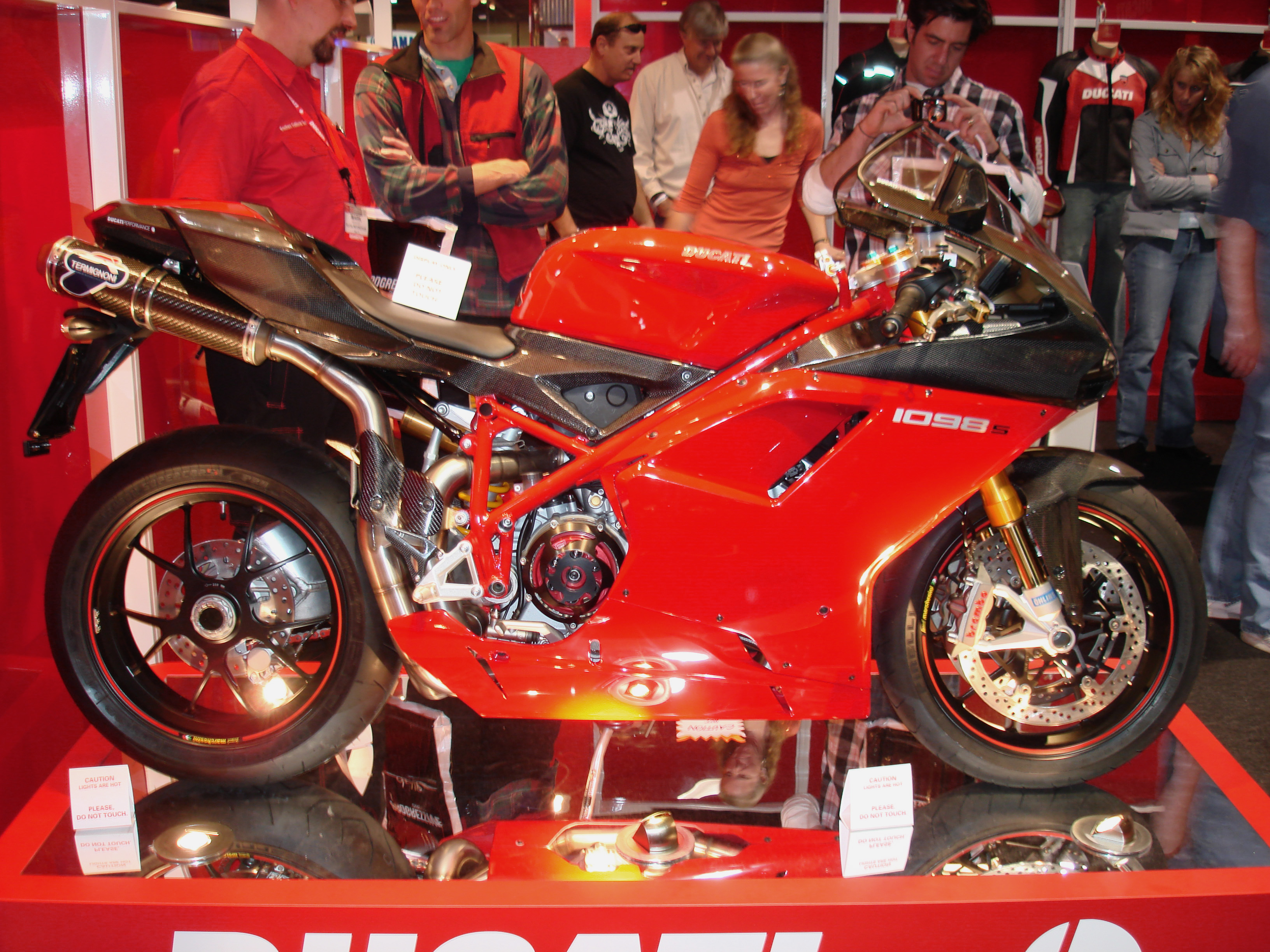
Ducati 1098 S

== See also ==
- List of fastest production motorcycles by acceleration
