= Joe Bennett =

Joe Bennett may refer to:

- Joe Bennett (dancer) (1889–1967), American eccentric dancer
- Joe Bennett (baseball) (1900–1987), American Major League player
- Joe Bennett (American football) (1901–1975), American football and basketball player
- Joe Bennett (1940–2015), American rock and roll singer, songwriter, and guitarist, leader of Joe Bennett & the Sparkletones
- Joe Bennett (artist) (born 1968), Brazilian comic book penciller
- Joe Bennett (musician) (born 1969), British musician
- Joe Bennett (writer) (born 1957), New Zealand writer
- Joe Bennett (footballer) (born 1990), English footballer for Cardiff City

== See also ==
- Joe Bennet Aldert (1889–1967), vaudeville dancer
- Joseph Bennett (disambiguation)
