= Crime Bible =

Fictional book

- The first page from Crime Bible: Five Lessons of Blood #1 depicting a page from the Crime Bible, with art by Steve Lieber and Eric Trautmann.

Publication information
- Publisher: DC Comics
- First appearance: 52

In story information
- Type: Book
- Element of stories featuring: Darkseid

The Crime Bible is a fictional religious book that has appeared in various comic book series published by DC Comics. The book and the religious groups that have formed around it exist within DC's main shared universe, known as the DC Universe.

The book deals with the exploits of Cain and his works of evil in the world, in association with Lilith. The copy of the Bible seen most often in the DCU allegedly has a cover of stone, made from the rock Cain used to kill Abel.

== Publication history ==
The Crime Bible first appeared in the 2006 series 52, in the sections dealing with the characters Renee Montoya and Batwoman. In 2007, the story was continued in Crime Bible: Five Lessons of Blood, a five-issue limited series featuring Montoya as the Question. The Crime Bible reappears in Detective Comics, in which a rift develops between the followers of the Crime Bible based on differing interpretations of its teachings. The focus of the rift is that the book supposedly predicts the death of Batwoman; when she survives being stabbed through the heart, many of the cultists come to believe the book is deeply flawed.

Bruno Mannheim uses the Crime Bible to help in running Intergang.

=== Final Crisis ===
In Final Crisis, Libra uses the Crime Bible to organize supervillains along religious lines. The Religion of Crime uses the Crime Bible as their central text.

== Collections ==
The limited series was collected into one volume:

- The Question: Five Books of Blood (128 pages, hardcover, June 2008, ISBN 1-4012-1799-0)

== In other media ==
The Crime Bible appears in DC Universe Online. In both the hero and villain campaigns, the player is tasked with stealing it from Bruno Mannheim.
