= George Gustines =

American dramatist (born 1971)

- Born: George Gene Gustines; 1971 (age 54–55); New York City, US
- Occupations: Magazine editor, journalist, playwright
- Notable credit: The New York Times
- Spouse: Steven Schack

George Gene Gustines (born 1971) is an American journalist who is the managing editor of T, a magazine of The New York Times.

As a journalist, he has written for the "New Jersey", Circuits (technology), "Escapes", "The City", "Television" and "Arts and Leisure" weekly sections, and the daily National, "Culture" and "Business" sections of the Times.

Gustines joined the staff of The New York Times in 1991.

== Personal life ==
Gustines is the son of Aida and Jorge Gustines. A longtime resident of New York City, Gustines lives with his partner, Steven Schack.

== Partial bibliography ==
=== Reviews ===
- "Books of the Times: A Bittersweet Tale of Father and Daughter." (Review of Alison Bechdel's Fun Home: A Family Tragicomic) The New York Times, 26 June 2006.

=== Off-Off-Broadway plays ===
1997

- With Steve Schack. Papered Over. Producers Club, 1997 [self-produced].

=== Graphic novels edited ===
- Bernatovech, Rich and Vecchio, Luciano. Sentinels, Book 1: Footsteps. Drumfish Productions, 2003. ISBN 0-9745885-0-4
- Bernatovech, Rich and Vecchio, Luciano. Sentinels, Book 2: Masks. Drumfish Productions.
