= Osric Chau =

Canadian actor and martial artist

- 周逸之
- Chau in 2026
- Occupation: Actor
- Years active: 2002–present
- Website: www.osricchau.com

Osric Chau (Chinese: 周逸之; Jyutping: zau1 yat6 zi1) is a Canadian actor, best known for his role as Kevin Tran in the CW series Supernatural, Vogel in the BBC America series Dirk Gently's Holistic Detective Agency, and Ryan Choi in the TV shows set in the Arrowverse.

== Life and career ==
Chau's father is from Hong Kong, and his mother is from Malaysia. In 2000, he took up Wing Chun and continued to study the martial art for eight years. He also studied tai chi and traditional forms of wushu under Zhang Zhi Bing, a master from Harbin, China. After four years, upon Zhang's return to China, Chau enrolled in West Coast Chinese Martial Arts in Vancouver under head instructor Bruce Fontaine and studied modern wushu, a more performance-orientated martial art. In 2007, Chau trained for seven months with the BSU Wushu Team at Beijing Sport University in preparation for the Canadian National Team Trials. Upon his return, he became a member of the Canadian National Wushu Team.

Chau originally wanted to be a stuntman rather than an actor, and worked on stunts for EA Games before appearing in his first major role opposite David Carradine and Daryl Hannah in the two-part television film Kung Fu Killer. He went on to make his feature film debut in a supporting role in the 2009 film 2012 and later became more well known through his recurring role as Kevin Tran in the CW fantasy series Supernatural.

Chau has collaborated with the YouTube channel The Hillywood Show in video parodies of The Walking Dead, Supernatural, and Sherlock. He has also been involved with campaigns against stereotyping in media.

In 2018, Chau starred in the Manila-set independent film Empty by Design alongside Filipina actress Rhian Ramos and Crazy Rich Asians actor Chris Pang. Empty by Design marks Chau's first feature film producing endeavor. In September 2019, Chau was cast as Ryan Choi in the Arrowverse, and was featured during three of the "Crisis on Infinite Earths" episodes. In November 2019, he was cast as the lead to the Indonesian horror film, The Villa.

In 2021, he returned to The Flash as Ryan Choi for the third and fourth parts of its "Armageddon" event which opened the eighth season. This was an alternate timeline version who had no family, but as part of Team Flash had taken up the mantle of Atom like in the comics.

== Filmography ==
=== Television ===
Year	Title	Role	Notes
2002	Cold Squad	Vic Dnang	
2007	Dragon Boys	Teen	Television film
2008	Kung Fu Killer	Lang Han	Television film
2009	The Troop	Hector	Episode: "Forest Grump"
2011	Best Player	Ash's buddy	Television film
2012	Mister French Taste	Leon	7 episodes, writer for 1 other
2012	Halo 4: Forward Unto Dawn	J.J.	
2012–2019	Supernatural	Kevin Tran	Recurring role, 20 episodes
2014	The 100	Red Eyed Boy	Episode: "I Am Become Death"
2015	Beyond Redemption	Rickson	
2015	Blood and Water	Charlie Xie	
2016	Criminal Minds: Beyond Borders	Gul	
2016–2017	Dirk Gently's Holistic Detective Agency	Vogel (member of the Rowdy 3)	Recurring role
2019–2021	Carmen Sandiego	The Troll	Voice
2019, 2021	The Flash	Ryan Choi / Atom	Episodes: "Crisis on Infinite Earths, Part 3", "Armageddon" parts 3 and 4
2020	Arrow	Ryan Choi / Atom	Episode: "Crisis on Infinite Earths, Part 4"
2020	Legends of Tomorrow	Ryan Choi / Atom	Episode: "Crisis on Infinite Earths, Part 5"
2021	Morning Show Mysteries	Wally	Episode 6: "Murder Ever After"
2021, 2023	Nancy Drew	Edwin George Chen	3 episodes
2022	Star Trek: Discovery	Oros	Episode: "The Galactic Barrier"
2022	Tekken: Bloodline	Bully 1	Voice, 1 episode
2022	Christmas at the Golden Dragon	Rick Chen	Television film
2023	My Adventures with Superman	Lewis Lane	Voice, episode: "Kiss Kiss Fall in Portal"
2024	Avatar: The Last Airbender	Tan	Episode: "Omashu"
2024	Fire Country	Kenji	Episode: "What the Bride Said"
2024	Holidazed	Ted Lin	
2026-present	Avatar: Seven Havens	Molin, Various voices	Voice

=== Film ===
Year	Title	Role	Notes
2009	2012	Nima	
2010	What Women Want	Chen Er Dong	
2012	Fun Size	Peng	
2012	The Man With The Iron Fists	Blacksmith's Assistant	
2014	The Akira Project	Kaneda Shotaro	
2016	The Matchbreaker	Sam	Independent film
2017	Boone: The Bounty Hunter	Denny	
2018	Status Update	Donald Fu	
2019	Empty by Design	Eric	Independent film; also producer
2021	Superhost	Teddy	Also executive producer
2023	Zoe.mp4	Matt	
2025	Worth the Wait	Nathan	

=== Other ===
Year	Title	Role	Notes
2009	The Tea Master	Stunts	Short film
2012	Must Come Down	Fight choreographer and executive producer	Short film
2014	The Walking Dead Parody	Glenn Rhee	Parody by the Hillywood Show
2015	Supernatural Parody	Sam Winchester	Parody by the Hillywood Show
2016	Sherlock Parody	Jim Moriarty	Parody by the Hillywood Show
2018	Supernatural Parody 2	Sam Winchester	Parody by the Hillywood Show
2019	Umbrella Academy Parody	Ben Hargreeves	Parody by the Hillywood Show
