= Crisis on Infinite Earths (Arrowverse) =

Arrowverse crossover event

- Arrowverse crossover event
- Promotional poster for the first three episodes

Part 1: Supergirl
- Episode title: "Crisis on Infinite Earths: Part One"
- Episode no.: Season 5 Episode 9
- Directed by: Jesse Warn
- Story by: Robert Rovner; Marc Guggenheim
- Teleplay by: Derek Simon; Jay Faerber
- Production code: T13.21809
- Original air date: December 8, 2019

Episode chronology
← Previous "The Wrath of Rama Khan"	Next → "The Bottle Episode"
- Supergirl season 5

Part 2: Batwoman
- Episode title: "Crisis on Infinite Earths: Part Two"
- Episode no.: Season 1 Episode 9
- Directed by: Laura Belsey
- Written by: Don Whitehead; Holly Henderson
- Production code: T13.21958
- Original air date: December 9, 2019

Episode chronology
← Previous "A Mad Tea-Party"	Next → "How Queer Everything Is Today!"
- Batwoman season 1

Part 3: The Flash
- Episode title: "Crisis on Infinite Earths: Part Three"
- Episode no.: Season 6 Episode 9
- Directed by: David McWhirter
- Story by: Eric Wallace
- Teleplay by: Lauren Certo; Sterling Gates
- Production code: T27.14009
- Original air date: December 10, 2019

Episode chronology
← Previous "The Last Temptation of Barry Allen, Pt. 2"	Next → "Marathon"
- The Flash season 6

Part 4: Arrow
- Episode title: "Crisis on Infinite Earths: Part Four"
- Episode no.: Season 8 Episode 8
- Directed by: Glen Winter
- Written by: Marv Wolfman; Marc Guggenheim
- Production code: T27.13958
- Original air date: January 14, 2020

Episode chronology
← Previous "Purgatory"	Next → "Green Arrow & The Canaries"
- Arrow season 8

Part 5: Legends of Tomorrow
- Episode title: "Crisis on Infinite Earths: Part Five"
- Episode no.: Season 5 Special episode
- Directed by: Gregory Smith
- Written by: Keto Shimizu; Ubah Mohamed
- Production code: T13.21908
- Original air date: January 14, 2020

Episode chronology
← Previous "Hey, World!"	Next → "Meet the Legends"
- Legends of Tomorrow season 5

Crossover chronology
- Preceded by: Elseworlds
- Followed by: Armageddon

"Crisis on Infinite Earths" is the sixth Arrowverse crossover event, featuring episodes of Supergirl, Batwoman, The Flash, Arrow, and Legends of Tomorrow on The CW. The Supergirl, Batwoman, and The Flash episodes aired in December 2019 while the Arrow and Legends of Tomorrow episodes aired in January 2020. The events of the Black Lightning episode "The Book of Resistance: Chapter Four: Earth Crisis" (which aired between Batwoman and The Flash) and a two-issue comic book with characters and concepts unused in the live-action episodes also tied into the event.

"Crisis on Infinite Earths", inspired by the comic of the same name, continues plotlines established in the previous crossover, "Elseworlds". The preceding episodes of Arrow season eight and much of The Flash season six serve as a prelude to the crossover. In "Crisis", the Monitor gathers Green Arrow, the Flash, Supergirl, Batwoman, Sara Lance, Ray Palmer, and several others from throughout the multiverse to stop the Anti-Monitor from destroying reality. The crossover's events result in some aspects of the Arrowverse being rebooted, affecting all of the series.

Initial references to the crossover began in 2014 with The Flash's pilot episode. The adaptation began in earnest during the development of "Elseworlds", and the crossover's title was revealed at the end of "Elseworlds" in December 2018. Casting was announced in mid-2019 and included actors who previously portrayed DC characters in other media, such as Burt Ward and Kevin Conroy. Cress Williams from Black Lightning crossed over with the Arrowverse for the first time, and other actors reprised their roles from various DC films and television series. The event was filmed from the end of September to the beginning of November 2019.

"Crisis on Infinite Earths" was met with positive reviews from critics, with praise for its scope, ambition, and cameos, though the fate of Oliver Queen had a mixed reception. The crossover proved popular, as each episode gave season-high ratings to its corresponding series. A two-episode aftershow, Crisis Aftermath hosted by Kevin Smith, aired after parts one and three to explore the crossover's events. "Crisis on Infinite Earths" was intended to be followed by a crossover between Batwoman and Superman & Lois in 2021, but this did not occur because of the COVID-19 pandemic, being replaced informally by David Ramsey appearing as John Diggle on multiple Arrowverse series. The next crossover, "Armageddon", occurs over the first five episodes of the eighth season of The Flash in November and December 2021.

== Synopsis ==
=== Prelude ===
To prepare for the coming crisis, the Monitor recruits Oliver Queen and Martian Manhunter and sends the former on missions to collect a variety of items, while he retrieves the body of Lex Luthor and revives him. Meanwhile, Barry Allen and Iris West-Allen learn that the crisis date has moved up to December 2019 and that the Flash must die to save billions of lives. Barry travels to Earth-3 to see Jay Garrick and Joan Williams, who have been tracking antimatter signatures across the multiverse, to learn more about what happens to him. They send Barry's mind forward in time, making him see billions of timelines where the multiverse is destroyed and one where he dies saving it.

While on a mission, Oliver witnesses the destruction of Earth-2 from an antimatter wave. In Star City, William Clayton, Connor Hawke, and Mia Smoak time-travel from 2040 to the present, while Oliver and John Diggle learn that Lyla Michaels has been working with the Monitor. Moments before the crisis begins, Nash Wells is pulled into a chamber under Central City after he is promised a new life. As the crisis starts, the sky over Central City and Lian Yu turns red. Lyla, now a "harbinger of things to come", collects Oliver and Mia on Lian Yu.

On an unspecified Earth, the sky also turns red over Freeland and adversely reacts to Jennifer Pierce's powers, tearing her between her Earth and those of two of her doppelgängers. As the Pierce family and Peter Gambi try to bring her back, the antimatter wave overtakes them while Jefferson Pierce is transported away.

=== Plot ===
Having already destroyed countless parallel universes, (Note: Those named on-screen include Earth-89, Earth-9, Earth-X, and Earth-66.) the antimatter wave makes its way to Earth-38. Brainiac 5 detects the wave approaching Argo City, prompting Kara Danvers to warn her mother Alura Zor-El, her cousin Clark Kent, and his wife Lois Lane. Clark and Lois send their son, Jonathan, off in an escape pod just before the wave hits. Harbinger brings Oliver, Mia, Barry, Kate Kane, Sara Lance, and Ray Palmer to Earth-38 and rescues the Kents from Argo. As Harbinger briefs the heroes on the situation, the Monitor raises a tower to impede the wave while the DEO and Lena Luthor evacuate Earth-38's inhabitants. Brainy finds Jonathan's pod on Earth-16, so he, Lois, and Sara leave to retrieve him while the others fight the Anti-Monitor's forces. Preparing to die, Oliver passes the Green Arrow mantle to Mia. When he learns that Barry is fated to die, however, he argues with the Monitor about their deal. (Note: As depicted in the 2018 crossover, "Elseworlds".) The heroes fight an army of Shadow Demons until the Monitor breaches them off-world. Refusing to leave, Oliver nullifies the Monitor and stays behind to protect the exodus. Lois' team returns to Earth-1 with Jonathan just as the Monitor brings a dying Oliver to say goodbye. Nash, now a "Pariah" for releasing the Anti-Monitor, announces that events have changed and all is lost.

Harbinger recruits Earth-74's Mick Rory so the heroes can use his Waverider as their headquarters. Following Oliver's death, the Monitor consults the Book of Destiny and learns about four of seven Paragons: Hope (Kara); Destiny (Sara); Truth (a Superman who has suffered "more than any mortal man"); and Courage (the "Bat of the Future"). Clark, Lois, and Iris locate the second Superman on Earth-96, where Lex uses the Book of Destiny to brainwash that Earth's Clark until Lois knocks Lex out. Kara and Kate travel to Earth-99, but fail to recruit its Batman after discovering he murdered his world's Superman while Sara, Barry, Mia, and John Constantine take Oliver to a Lazarus Pit on Earth-18 in an attempt to resurrect him, only to learn his soul is missing. On the Waverider, the Monitor has Ray build a "Paragon Detector", which identifies Kate as the Paragon of Courage. Elsewhere, Harbinger is secretly contacted by the Anti-Monitor.

The Paragon detector identifies Barry as the Paragon of Love, J'onn J'onzz as the Paragon of Honor, and Ivy Town scientist Ryan Choi as the Paragon of Humanity; Iris, Ray, and Ralph Dibny leave to recruit Choi. After the Monitor restores Cisco Ramon's powers, he, Barry, and Caitlin Snow meet Pariah in the Anti-Monitor's chamber and find an anti-matter cannon powered by Earth-90's Flash. When Cisco frees Barry-90, the cannon goes critical, so Pariah recruits Jefferson from his recently destroyed Earth to contain its energy. Barry-1 volunteers to destroy it, but Barry-90 stops him, saying that the Monitor did not specify which Flash would die, and sacrifices himself in his place. Meanwhile, Constantine, Mia, and Diggle visit Lucifer on Earth-666 for help entering purgatory and retrieving Oliver's soul. Before they can leave, a Spectre named Jim Corrigan appears and beckons Oliver to come with him, forcing Constantine's team to return to the Waverider without him. Suddenly, the Anti-Monitor sends a brainwashed Harbinger to kill the Monitor so he can absorb his power and finish destroying the multiverse. Before he is killed, Pariah sends the Paragons to the Vanishing Point, where they witness Lex replace Superman-96 with himself using a Book of Destiny page.

On the planet Maltus 10,000 years earlier, Mar Novu attempts to see the birth of the universe, only to end up in the antimatter universe and reveal the multiverse's existence to the Anti-Monitor. Back in the present, following the multiverse's destruction, the Paragons struggle to survive at the Vanishing Point. Once Corrigan teaches him to how use the Spectre's power, Oliver goes to the Vanishing Point to rescue the Paragons and strengthen Barry. Barry drops off Kara, Choi, and Lex on Maltus, but temporarily loses everyone else in the Speed Force after an encounter with the Anti-Monitor. Kara and Choi convince Novu not to implement his plans before Barry takes them and the other Paragons to the dawn of time. There, they learn that the Anti-Monitor will always learn about the multiverse's existence because they only stopped one version of Novu. The Paragons battle the Anti-Monitor and his Shadow Demons until Oliver uses the Spectre's power to restore the multiverse while the Paragons provide help via Lex's page. Despite succeeding, Oliver dies once more, with Barry and Sara at his side.

In the recreated universe, the Paragons discover only they remember the crisis and that Earth-1, Earth-38, and Jefferson's Earth were merged into Earth-Prime, and the multiverse is reborn. J'onn uses his psionic powers to restore their allies' memories while Sara tries to find Oliver. When the Paragons are attacked by Shadow Demons, a restored Nash discovers that the Anti-Monitor is still alive and plans to resume destroying the multiverse. The heroes find the Anti-Monitor and engage him in battle, buying time for Nash, Ray, Barry, and Choi to develop a bomb that shrinks the Anti-Monitor, banishing him to the microverse. Barry, Kara, Sara, Kate, Clark, J'onn, and Jefferson hold a memorial service for Oliver and agree to protect their new world in his memory.

== Cast and characters ==
=== Main and recurring ===
Main and recurring characters appearing in "Crisis on Infinite Earths"
Actor	Character	Episode				
Actor	Character	Supergirl	Batwoman	The Flash	Arrow	Legends of Tomorrow
Melissa Benoist	Kara Danvers / Kara Zor-El / Supergirl	Main	Guest	Guest	Guest	Guest
Chyler Leigh	Alex Danvers	Main				Guest
Katie McGrath	Lena Luthor	Main				
Jesse Rath	Querl "Brainy" Dox / Brainiac 5	Main				
Nicole Maines	Nia Nal / Dreamer	Main				Guest
Azie Tesfai	Kelly Olsen	Main				
LaMonica Garrett	Mar Novu / Monitor	Main	Main	Main	Main	
LaMonica Garrett	Mobius / Anti-Monitor		Main	Main (Note: Garrett voices the character in the episode while the Anti-Monitor is possessing Harbinger.)	Main	Main
David Harewood	J'onn J'onzz / Martian Manhunter	Main		Guest	Guest	Guest
Stephen Amell	Oliver Queen / Green Arrow / Spectre (Earth-1)	Guest	Guest	Guest	Main	Voice
Stephen Amell	Oliver Queen / Green Arrow (Earth-16)	Guest				
Caity Lotz	Sara Lance / White Canary	Guest	Guest	Guest	Guest	Main
Brandon Routh	Ray Palmer / Atom	Guest	Guest	Guest	Guest	Main
Brandon Routh	Clark Kent / Superman (Earth-96)		Guest	Guest		Main
Tom Cavanagh	Nash Wells / Pariah	Guest		Main		Guest
Katherine McNamara	Mia Smoak / Green Arrow	Guest	Guest	Guest	Main (Note: These actors do not appear in the episode despite being credited.)	
Tyler Hoechlin	Clark Kent / Superman (Earth-38)	Guest	Guest	Guest	Guest	Guest
Elizabeth Tulloch	Lois Lane (Earth-38)	Guest	Guest	Guest	Guest	Guest
Elizabeth Tulloch	Lois Lane (Earth-75)		Guest			
Ruby Rose	Kate Kane / Batwoman	Guest	Main	Guest	Guest	Guest
Grant Gustin	Barry Allen / Flash	Guest	Guest	Main	Guest	Guest
Audrey Marie Anderson	Lyla Michaels / Harbinger	Guest	Guest	Guest		Guest
Camrus Johnson	Luke Fox (Earth-99)		Main			
Candice Patton	Iris West-Allen		Guest	Main		
Dominic Purcell	Mick Rory / Heat Wave (Earth-Prime)					Main
Dominic Purcell	Mick Rory / Heat Wave (Earth-74)		Guest			
Jon Cryer	Lex Luthor		Guest	Guest	Guest	Guest
Matt Ryan	John Constantine		Guest	Guest		Main
Danielle Panabaker	Caitlin Snow / Frost			Main		Guest
Carlos Valdes	Cisco Ramon / Vibe			Main		
Hartley Sawyer	Ralph Dibny / Elongated Man			Main		
David Ramsey	John Diggle / Spartan			Guest	Main	Guest
Osric Chau	Ryan Choi			Guest	Guest	Guest
Rick Gonzalez	Rene Ramirez / Wild Dog			Archive footage (Note: Gonzalez and Harkavy appear via archive footage from the Arrow episode "Starling City".)	Main	Guest
Juliana Harkavy	Dinah Drake			Archive footage	Main	Guest
Katie Cassidy	Laurel Lance (Earth-1)				Main	
Jes Macallan	Ava Sharpe					Main
Nick Zano	Nate Heywood					Main

Despite being credited, Andrea Brooks, Julie Gonzalo, and Staz Nair do not appear in the Supergirl episode; Danielle Nicolet and Jesse L. Martin do not appear in The Flash episode; Ben Lewis and Joseph David-Jones do not appear in the Arrow episode; and Tala Ashe, Maisie Richardson-Sellers, Courtney Ford, Olivia Swann, and Amy Louise Pemberton do not appear in the Legends of Tomorrow episode.

=== Guests ===
==== Supergirl ====
- Erica Durance as Alura Zor-El (Earth-38)
- Burt Ward as Dick Grayson (Earth-66)
- Robert Wuhl as Alexander Knox (Earth-89)
- Griffin Newman as a trivia night host
- Wil Wheaton as a doomsday protester
- Alan Ritchson as Hank Hall / Hawk (Earth-9) (Note: The actor was uncredited in their appearance.) (Note: Via archive footage from the Titans episode "Trigon".)
- Curran Walters as Jason Todd / Robin (Earth-9)
- Russell Tovey as Ray Terrill / The Ray

==== Batwoman ====
- Tom Welling as Clark Kent (Earth-167)
- Kevin Conroy as Bruce Wayne (Earth-99)
- Johnathon Schaech as Jonah Hex (Earth-18)
- Erica Durance as Lois Lane (Earth-167)
- Wentworth Miller as the voice of the Leonard A.I. (Earth-74)

==== The Flash ====
- Cress Williams as Jefferson Pierce / Black Lightning
- Ashley Scott as Helena Kyle / Huntress (Earth-203)
- Stephen Lobo as Jim Corrigan
- John Wesley Shipp as Barry Allen / Flash (Earth-90)
- Tom Ellis as Lucifer Morningstar (Earth-666)
- Wentworth Miller as the voice of the Leonard A.I. (Earth-74)
- Dina Meyer as the voice of Barbara Gordon / Oracle (Earth-203)
- Amanda Pays as Tina McGee (Earth-90) (Note: Via archive footage from the 1990 TV series The Flash.)

==== Arrow ====
- Stephen Lobo as Jim Corrigan
- Melanie Merkosky as Xneen Novu
- Ezra Miller as Barry Allen (DC Extended Universe)

==== Legends of Tomorrow ====
- Cress Williams as Jefferson Pierce / Black Lightning
- Reina Hardesty as Joss Jackam / Weather Witch
- Eileen Pedde as the President of the United States
- Marv Wolfman as himself
- Raúl Herrera as Sargon the Sorcerer
- Benjamin Diskin as the voice of Beebo
- Brec Bassinger as Courtney Whitmore / Stargirl (Earth-2) (Note: Via footage from the Stargirl episode "The Justice Society".)
- Yvette Monreal as Yolanda Montez / Wildcat (Earth-2)
- Anjelika Washington as Beth Chapel / Doctor Mid-Nite (Earth-2)
- Cameron Gellman as Rick Tyler / Hourman (Earth-2)
- Derek Mears as Swamp Thing (Earth-19) (Note: Via archive footage from the Swamp Thing episode "Loose Ends".)
- Teagan Croft as Rachel Roth (Earth-9) (Note: Via archive footage from the first season of Titans.)
- Curran Walters as Jason Todd / Robin (Earth-9)
- Alan Ritchson as Hank Hall / Hawk (Earth-9)
- Minka Kelly as Dawn Granger / Dove (Earth-9)
- Anna Diop as Koriand'r / Kory Anders / Starfire (Earth-9)
- April Bowlby as Rita Farr (Earth-21) (Note: Via archive footage from a deleted scene from the first season of Doom Patrol.)
- Diane Guerrero as Jane (Earth-21)
- Joivan Wade as Victor "Vic" Stone / Cyborg (Earth-21)
- Riley Shanahan as Cliff Steele (Earth-21)
- Matthew Zuk as Larry Trainor (Earth-21)

== Production ==
=== Development ===
"Crisis on Infinite Earths" was first hinted at in the Arrowverse in the pilot episode of The Flash. In September 2018, three months before the release of "Elseworlds" (the Arrowverse crossover in the 2018–19 television season), Legends of Tomorrow executive producer Phil Klemmer said that the next crossover had "a loose shape". In early December 2018, a week before the airing of "Elseworlds", Arrow showrunner Beth Schwartz said that the producers of all the series "already know a lot about what's going on in next year's crossover"; according to Marc Guggenheim, "Elseworlds" would "lay the groundwork" for it. The end of "Elseworlds" revealed the crossover title and premise as "Crisis on Infinite Earths", adapting the story from the 1985 comic of the same name by Marv Wolfman and George Pérez. "Elseworlds" introduced the characters Mar Novu / Monitor and Psycho-Pirate, and alluded to an impending "crisis".

In January 2019, The Flash showrunner Todd Helbing said that the remainder of the fifth season would contain elements of the upcoming crossover. The CW president Mark Pedowitz called the crossover "the biggest, the most complicated one" to date, and was hopeful that Legends of Tomorrow (which did not participate in "Elseworlds" because of production complications) would be part of "Crisis". In May 2019, Pedowitz announced at The CW's upfront presentation that the crossover would include The Flash, Arrow, Supergirl, Legends of Tomorrow, and Batwoman in a five-episode event spanning late 2019 and early 2020. The crossover occurred in the ninth episodes of Supergirl's fifth season, Batwoman's first season, and The Flash's sixth season, in the eighth episode of Arrow's eighth season, and as a special episode of Legends of Tomorrow's fifth season which had not yet begun airing; this episode is not considered the series' season premiere. Guggenheim said that when they first presented the crossover to the studio and network, the creators stressed that they did not want the event to be "Crisis on CW Earths" but "to touch as many strands of the DC tapestry as possible". About the crossover's comparison to the Marvel Cinematic Universe (MCU) film Avengers: Endgame (2019), Guggenheim said "for Barry and Oliver, there is an emotional denouement that is reminiscent of Endgame ... Endgame is an exclamation point. 'Crisis' is a semicolon".

=== Lead-up ===
The May 2019 season finales of The Flash, Arrow, Supergirl, and Legends of Tomorrow contained hints of the upcoming crossover, with the Monitor appearing in all series except The Flash. The Flash season six showrunner Eric Wallace said that when all the series' showrunners discussed plans for their series before the crossover, "all of this synergy started to happen" with "a lot of cross collaboration" in service to the crossover's events. Wallace felt the themes of grief, death, and the end of all worlds in "Crisis" worked with the story they were trying to tell in the first half of season six of The Flash, particularly that of Ramsey Rosso / Bloodwork, "who is facing the end of his own world". This allowed the season's start to help set up the crossover.

Most of Arrow's eighth season is a prelude to the crossover. The Arrow writers consulted with their counterparts on The Flash about the destruction of Earth-2 in "Starling City" to ensure that they could destroy this Earth. On Supergirl, co-showrunner Robert Rovner said that the season would tease the crossover "in our way, which is a little bit different from the way Arrow and The Flash are doing it". Rovner cited the return of Malefic (J'onn J'onzz's brother) as a major plot thread leading to the crossover, calling it "a gauntlet for J'onn". LaMonica Garrett, who portrays the Monitor and the Anti-Monitor, said before the crossover that the Anti-Monitor's "presence [would] be felt before you physically see him ... You see just enough of him to know this guy means business, but it's not in your face in every scene leading up to" the crossover. The preceding episodes of Batwoman, Supergirl, The Flash, and Arrow contained a tag scene of Nash Wells accessing a chamber under Central City.

=== Tie-ins ===
The Black Lightning episode "The Book of Resistance: Chapter Four: Earth Crisis" tied in to "Crisis on Infinite Earths" before Jefferson Pierce first appeared in the crossover's Flash episode. In the Black Lightning episode, a red sky covers Freeland before anti-matter strikes Jennifer Pierce and sends her to a void where she finds her Earth-1 and 2 counterparts. An anti-matter wave wipes them and her Earth out, except for Jefferson, who is transported to an unknown location.

The crossover story was expanded in a two-issue comics series Crisis on Infinite Earths Giant, written by Marv Wolfman (who wrote the original 1985 series) and Guggenheim, and illustrated by Tom Derenick, Trevor Scott, John Kalisz, Andy Owens, Hi-Fi, Tom Grummett, Danny Miki, and Chris Sotomayor. The series reprinted material from the original Crisis on Infinite Earths comic, and its second issue included material from DC Universe: Legacies #6 (2010). About the series, Guggenheim said that its concept "came pretty early on in the process" when it was realized that the story's scope would exceed the five episodes. By creating the comics, it allowed the producers to utilize "all of the characters that we don't have in the crossover proper for logistical reasons, or financial reasons, or creative reasons ... [The comic series] allows us to tell a major piece of the story that we're designing, with characters and concepts that we couldn't achieve in live -action". Its four main characters are Felicity Smoak, the Ray, Nyssa al Ghul, and Wally West, in addition to appearances by Atom, Sara Lance, Batwoman, the Flash, the Monitor, Lex Luthor, and others. Serious consideration was given to the Huntress, but Guggenheim opted for Nyssa al Ghul because "we had done a comic-book tie-in that bridged seasons two and three of Arrow and [Huntress] had featured prominently in that, so Nyssa had not yet had her chance to be immortalized that way". Wolfman added that the comics were "created to tie in perfectly with The CW shows" so it felt like a main part of the story and not ancillary: "This is integral to the entire storyline". The first comic debuted at Walmart on December 15, 2019, with the second releasing on January 19, 2020; both were released in comic stores the following month. The series is set during the first part of the crossover's Batwoman episode. Its stories and behind-the-scenes extra content was published in a deluxe hardcover edition on July 7, 2020.

=== Writing ===
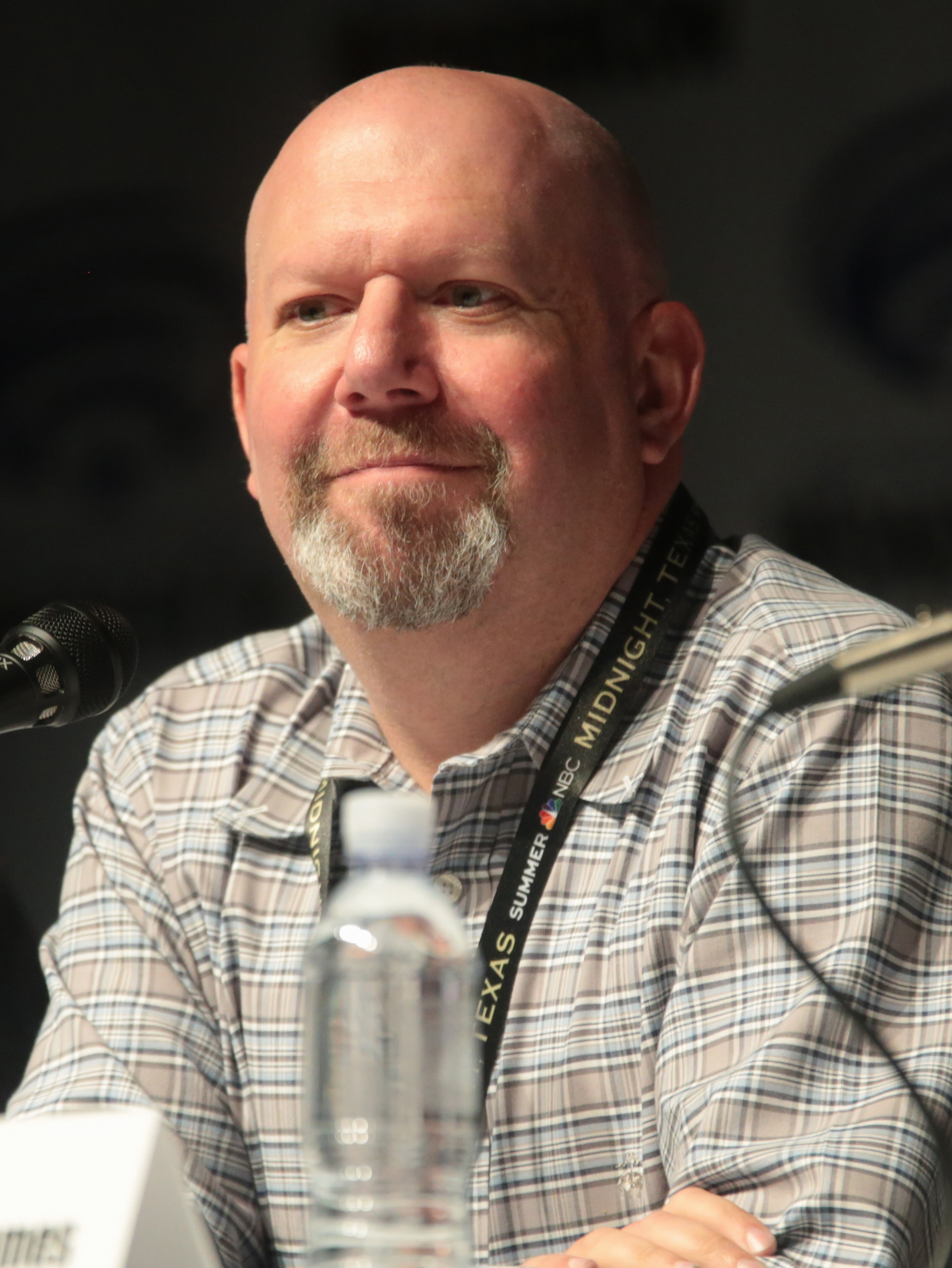
Marc Guggenheim was the overall creator of the "Crisis on Infinite Earths" crossover event

The Supergirl episode was written by Derek Simon and Jay Faerber, with Robert Rovner and Guggenheim contributing to the story; Don Whitehead and Holly Henderson wrote the Batwoman episode; and Lauren Certo and Sterling Gates wrote The Flash episode, based on a story by Eric Wallace. The Arrow episode was co-written by Wolfman and Guggenheim, and the Legends of Tomorrow episode was written by Keto Shimizu and Ubah Mohamed. Guggenheim was initially nervous about collaborating with Wolfman due to him being one of his idols and writing with a "heavy hand", but thankfully, their collaboration had no problems, with Guggenheim appreciating Wolfman's work for Luthor in the crossover.

The writers gathered for a two-week session to work on the crossover. Guggenheim, as the overall creative for "Crisis on Infinite Earths", began by creating "a series of big tentpole beats that could happen in each of the five hours". These moments were designed to be modular and could be moved throughout the episodes depending on each series' creative needs, actor availability, and other factors, while also determining episode order. Guggenheim's initial template had Arrow as the fourth hour and Legends of Tomorrow the fifth, "because in crossovers past, Legends has always been the finale of the crossover". The CW requested that The Flash be the third hour and after working "out those tentpoles, for a variety of different plot reasons, it made a lot of sense for the first hour to be Supergirl". Batwoman was the second hour. Certain characters were considered "integral" while others would make cameo appearances, depending on actor availability.

With the large moments determined, the writers separated to write each episode. The group reconvened to review the whole, making adjustments as necessary. Each series' writers would work on its title character's scenes, to ensure consistency. For scenes set in Gotham City, Batwoman showrunner Caroline Dries retained the series' grounded tone because it was "not normal for [the characters of Batwoman] to interact with aliens and travel to different universes". Although the crossover is considered "a five-hour epic", the title character of each series and characters appropriate in those worlds (such as Barry Allen of Earth-90 appearing on The Flash) are highlighted. The episode scripts were completed by early September 2019.

The original comic was created to help with DC Comics' continuity problems that could intimidate new readers; since the Arrowverse does not have those, however, the crossover allowed its creators to focus on the characters and their interactions. Supergirl and Batwoman's relationship was developed, after it was seen at the end of "Elseworlds" that "those two characters [are] supporting each other much in the same way that Barry and Oliver have been supporting each other in previous crossovers". This version of the Anti-Monitor was inspired by the character's appearance in the New 52 "Darkseid Wars" storyline. Sara Lance is the focus of the Legends of Tomorrow characters, with the crossover "kick[ing] off Sara's emotional journey for season 5 of Legends" and giving Sara "a different perspective on things".

Guggenheim said that the crossover would try to incorporate "seminal moments" from the comic book, opening with a similar destruction of parallel universes. Regarding the deaths of Supergirl and the Flash in the comic storyline, Wallace conceded that the writers "can't just kill all of our number ones on our shows", but a proper balance was found in killing some. Although it was revealed in "Elseworlds" that Oliver would die in the crossover (which, Guggenheim felt, "spoiled our own story"), his death in the first hour was an attempt to "surprise the audience" who may have expected him to die in the fifth; it also "establish[ed] the stakes going into the next four hours". The third-hour death of Barry Allen from Earth-90 was "a way to honor what was said [by] the Monitor ... saying the Flash must die", without killing Grant Gustin's character. According to Wallace, this gave "it a nice story twist, [to] get in some emotion" while "complet[ing] a 30-year arc" for John Wesley Shipp's character, who felt thankful in turn as his show didn't get a proper series finale. The flashback scene from the 1990 Flash television series, featuring Shipp's Barry Allen with Amanda Pays' Dr. Tina McGee, was added while editing the episode "to give a little bit of his life flashing before his eyes". Oliver dies a second time at the end of the Arrow episode. Guggenheim said that it was also done to "[surprise] the audience with the unexpected" ... "I think [Stephen Amell] enjoyed A) the opportunity to play two death scenes and B) the creative sleight of hand in terms of surprising the audience".

The inclusion of Clark Kent and Lois Lane from Smallville in the crossover explored the characters after Smallville ended. Smallville Season Eleven, a 2012–2015 comic book series, had previously explored Clark's adventures after the show's tenth and final season, and Guggenheim confirmed that while not directly referenced, the events from the comic series were considered canonical for the crossover. Erica Durance, who portrayed that series' Lois Lane, said: "It's a little bit of a look into their future and the different choices they've made to be together. It's a full-circle moment that's really nice". The Batwoman episode in which the characters appear was written by former Smallville writers, allowing Guggenheim to "[step] aside and let them speak to where things were headed. As a fan of the show, it answered a lot of questions that I had. It provided a lot of closure, I think, in a really nice way". The removal of this Clark's powers was a reference to Superman II (1980), where Christopher Reeve's Superman temporarily surrenders his powers. Although the details of how Smallville Clark lost his powers are not explored, "the idea that Clark would give up his powers in order to have this kind of life, that really resonated with all of" the writers and Tom Welling. Daily Planet articles written by Lois were shown "to make it very clear" to the audience "that he did become Superman, that he did have all these adventures, but they are left to your imagination". Smallville co-creator Alfred Gough was informed about the Smallville scenes before filming began. The three actors who portrayed Clark Kent / Superman in the crossover did not have a scene written containing all three. The writers wanted a clear distinction between Welling's character at the Kent Farm and Brandon Routh's character at the Daily Planet. Guggenheim said, "The desire to have multiple Supermen [together] is what inspired the backup story" in the comic tie-in. Appearing as Bruce Wayne in live-action for the first time allowed Kevin Conroy to "explore a lot of [the] dark corners" of the character in a different way than when he voiced an older version of the character in the DC Animated Universe (DCAU) series Batman Beyond.

Lucifer Morningstar's appearance was considered to be five years before the events of Lucifer, according to actor Tom Ellis: "This is him in his proper playboy, don't-give-a-damn-about-anything stage in his life. He is very irreverent with our characters when they turn up in the scene and obviously, with Constantine, there is some history there". His scene, written by Certo (a Lucifer fan), was sent to that series' creative team for their feedback. Lucifer co-showrunner Joe Henderson suggested Lucifer's flirting joke, and Ellis contributed his pronunciation of Constantine as "Constantyne". Henderson called Lucifer's appearance "the coolest thing" since he had wanted to participate in the crossover when he learned that it was adapting Crisis on Infinite Earths. Black Lightning's inclusion was decided "very late in the game", according to Guggenheim. He worked closely with Black Lightning showrunner Salim Akil to incorporate the character not as a cameo but "in a way that feels significant". Once the logistics and creative elements were solved, Black Lightning "elevated the crossover to another level". Actor Cress Williams said that the character enters "in a very surprising way. He's not prepared for it. So, he doesn't know these people". Because of this, there is "some conflict early on when he's trying to figure out, who are you people and why am I here?".

Barry's journey through the Speed Force in the Arrow hour was an opportunity for the writers to "revisit a series 'greatest hits' for Oliver, key moments in terms of his relationships ... it's a little bit of a 'Before you die, your life flashes before your eyes' kind of feel"; they wanted to "look backwards before Oliver's death". Oliver and John Diggle's fight in the Arrow season six episode "Brothers in Arms" was originally planned for Kate's scene in the Speed Force in which she helps break up the fight. Since the writers considered season six "relatively recent", they chose "Suicidal Tendencies" from season three. This episode (one of Guggenheim's favorites) and the argument between Oliver and Ray helped show "how much all of the shows have evolved and relationships between the characters have evolved". The other moments in the Speed Force were based on "showing how far the characters have come". In the Speed Force, Barry encounters Ezra Miller's Barry Allen from the DC Extended Universe (DCEU). Guggenheim worked with DC Comics chief creative officer Jim Lee and DC Entertainment film vice president Adam Schlagman on the scene to ensure that it would not conflict with their planned The Flash film (2023), which also deals with the multiverse. Much of the dialogue between Gustin and Miller was improvised. Miller's Allen, who had not yet gone by the moniker "The Flash", is given the name by Grant's Allen in the scene.

The glimpse of Stargirl and the Justice Society of America on Earth-2 from Stargirl was not originally intended. Stargirl creator Geoff Johns said that production of that series had completed, and Pedowitz advocated its inclusion after seeing footage of the series. Johns continued, "I was incredibly excited about the opportunity for that because it just meant more people would see it. And [tonally], Stargirl and the show has always been for everybody. Anyone can watch it. So it fits in nicely to that world". The end of the crossover sees Barry converting the old S.T.A.R. Labs hangar from the "Invasion!" crossover into a spot where the heroes could gather, along with hinting at a possible introduction of Gleek and the Wonder Twins. These hints were a "fun bit" for the writers to end the crossover, since an early version of the script had the Wonder Twins making an appearance.

Although early allusions to "Crisis" on The Flash mentioned the Reverse-Flash and Tom Cavanagh was said to be reprising his role in the crossover, the character did not appear. Guggenheim did not want to be beholden to this, pointing out that the newspaper headline mentioning him had been created by executives no longer involved with the series or this crossover, such as Andrew Kreisberg. The character had also already featured prominently in previous crossovers; Cavanagh nevertheless appeared in the crossover just not as Thawne. Psycho-Pirate, included in "Elseworlds", also appeared in early versions of the crossover. Guggenheim said that he was not included because "given the story we were telling, the only reason we were having him in there was because he was in the original comic". Guggenheim had tried to have Swamp Thing appear to interact with Constantine, given their history and relationship in the comics. Although Guggenheim considered it "a really important inclusion", "for a variety of different reasons" it did not happen.

=== Casting ===
LaMonica Garrett was upgraded to series regular on all the series (receiving credit in the episodes he appeared in before the crossover) to ensure that he would be available for "Crisis" and its lead-up. Casting was announced at the July 2019 San Diego Comic-Con. They included: Tyler Hoechlin, reprising his role as Superman, while Brandon Routh, who portrays Ray Palmer / Atom in the Arrowverse, would reprise his role as Superman from Superman Returns (2006) in "an older, more world-weary" version inspired by the comics' Kingdom Come Superman; Tom Cavanagh also portraying Pariah in addition to Nash Wells; Burt Ward, who portrayed Dick Grayson / Robin in the 1966 Batman television series, was cast in an undisclosed role; Amell would portray several versions of Oliver Queen; Jon Cryer would reprise his role as Lex Luthor; and Garrett would portray the Anti-Monitor and the Monitor. Luthor was not originally intended to appear, but Cryer talked to Warner Bros. Television president Peter Roth about the character's prominence in the original comic to lobby for his inclusion. Shortly afterwards, Elizabeth Tulloch was confirmed to be reprising her role as Lois Lane.

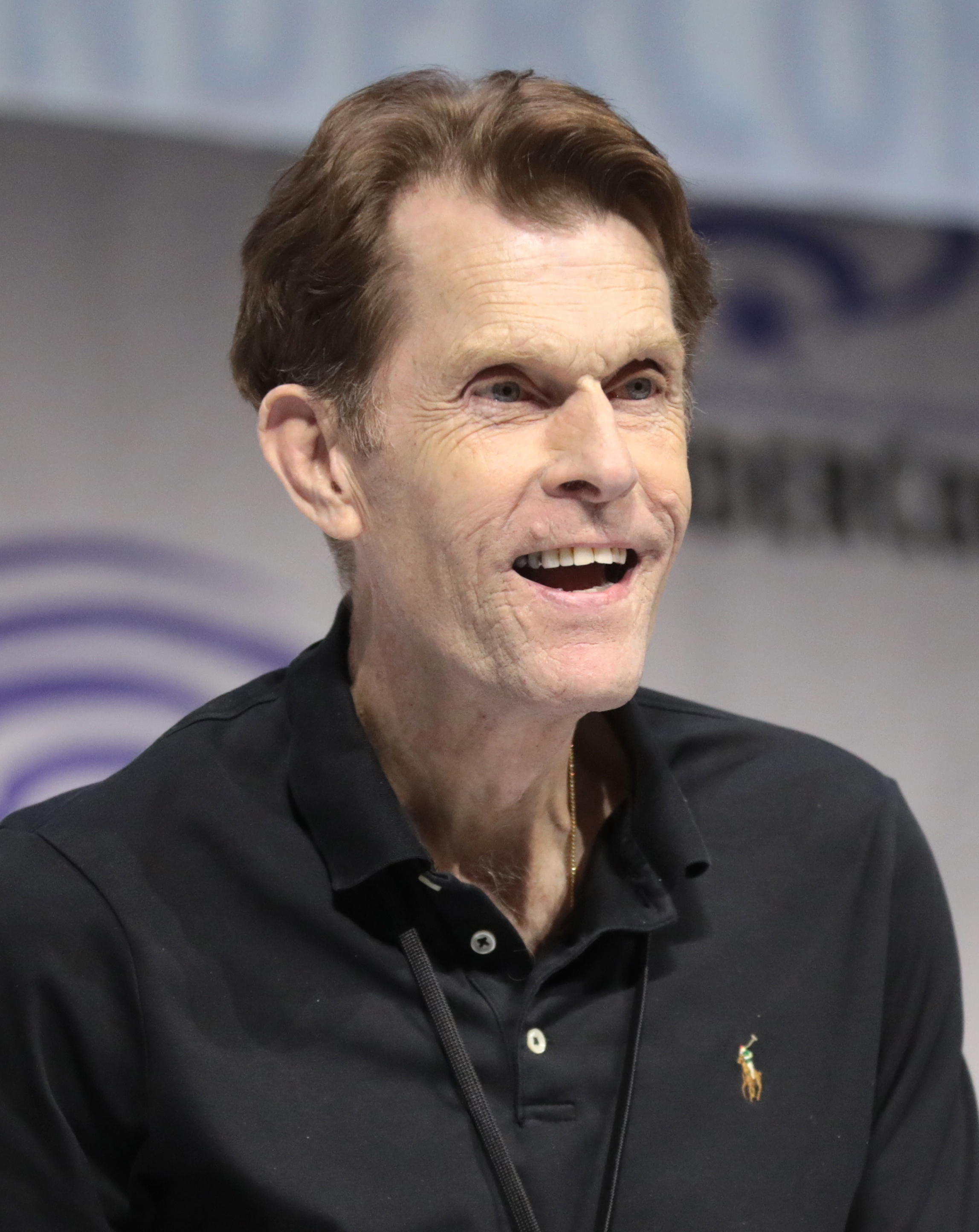
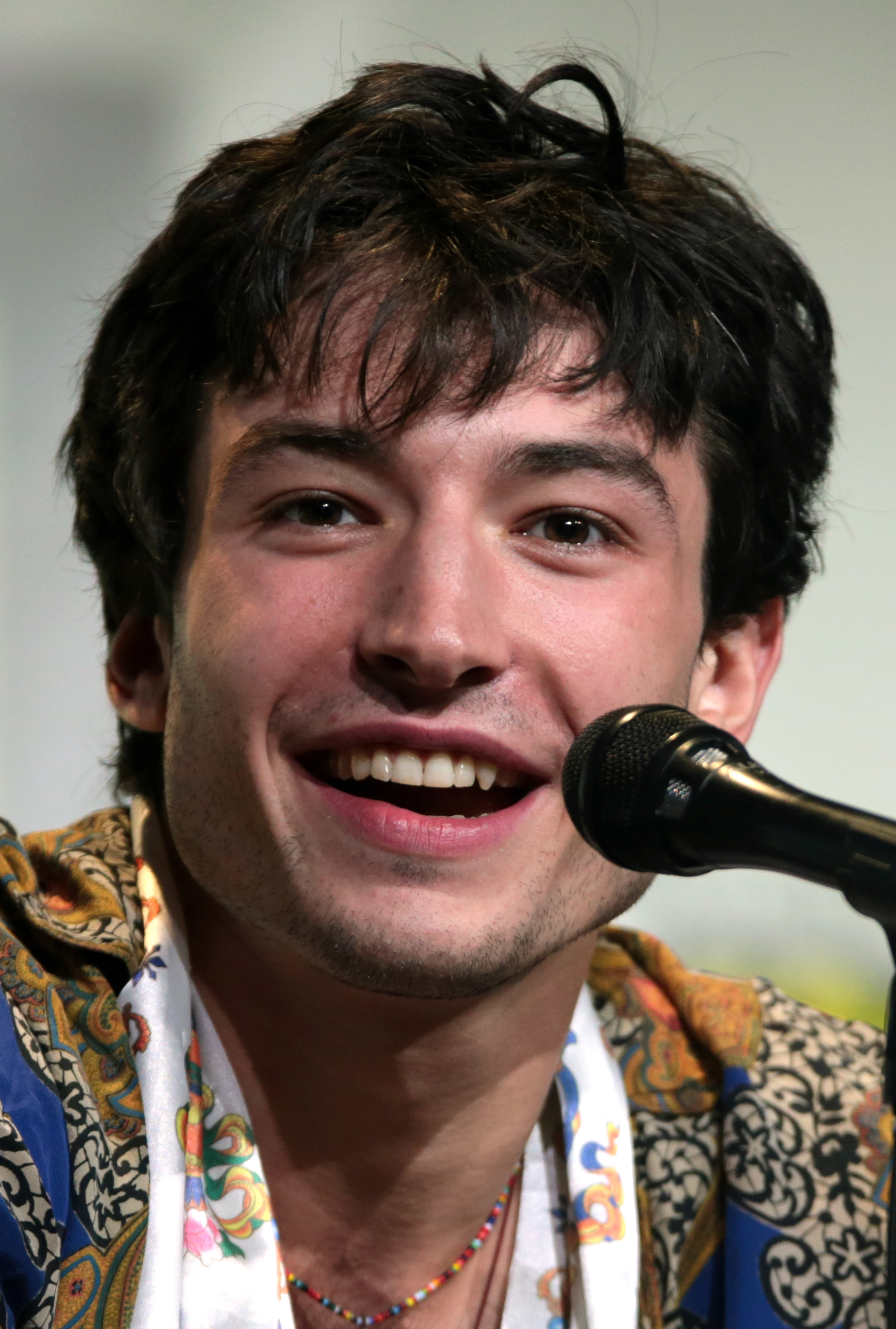
Kevin Conroy (L) and Ezra Miller (R) were some of the guest stars in the crossover, with Conroy portraying Bruce Wayne for the first time in live-action, and Miller reprising their role of Barry Allen from the DC Extended Universe.

Pedowitz announced at the Television Critics Association press tour the following month that cast members from Black Lightning would appear (previously hinted at by Cress Williams), and Kevin Conroy would portray an elderly Bruce Wayne after voicing the character in multiple animated media. Conroy "jumped at" the opportunity to portray Wayne in live-action for the first time, saying that it would satisfy the "loyal" fanbase of Batman: The Animated Series. Concept art by Andy Poon displayed in Crisis on Infinite Earths: Paragons Rising seemingly depicted Michael Keaton filling the role of Earth-99's Bruce Wayne by reprising his role as Bruce Wayne / Batman from the 1989-1997 Batman film series. Though Guggenheim confirmed that Keaton was never approached, a newspaper with his likeness was spotted in a leak from the Earth-89 scene. Guggenheim said that although the producers discussed with DC and Warner Bros. the possibility of Lynda Carter reprising her role as Wonder Woman from the 1975 television series, they felt that it was unlikely. Guggenheim was initially hesitant in asking Ward if he was interested in returning after the idea of bringing Ward back was brought up in the crossover's writers' room, but The Flash line producer Joseph Patrick Finn convinced him under the logical pretext that if he didn't ask, he wouldn't get Ward in case he was interested; Ward gladly accepted to return, though the crew made sure his character wasn't identified onscreen but just hint at his identity.

Johnathon Schaech was confirmed as reprising his role as Jonah Hex in September 2019, and John Wesley Shipp was cast in an undisclosed role shortly afterwards. Around this time, Tom Ellis was approached to appear as Lucifer Morningstar from the series Lucifer. Ellis had "talked over the years about Lucifer being a DC character and 'Is there any chance of this happening?'", saying that "Crisis" was a good chance to explore that connection. In mid-September, it was announced that Tom Welling and Erica Durance would reprise their roles as Clark Kent and Lois Lane, respectively, from Smallville; Durance would also reprise her Arrowverse role as Alura Zor-El. Welling had been previously approached to reprise his role as Kent in past Arrowverse crossovers, but he felt "protective" over the fact his character didn't exist in the main reality of those shows until he was convinced to return by reading the crossover's script. Once on the set, Welling took a walk to get into "John Schneider's spirit" due to loving the idea Clark grew up to become like his father and requested some gloves, which a grip lent to him. Michael Rosenbaum, who portrayed Lex Luthor on Smallville, said that he declined Warner Bros. and the producers' offer to reprise the role in "Crisis", as they demanded him a quick response while visiting one of his relatives with no specifics on what his reprisal would consist. The Smallville scenes had already been shot when the producers approached Rosenbaum thanks to Amell's efforts, with Guggenheim planning to have his version of Luthor interact with Cryer's. Alan Ritchson, who portrayed Arthur Curry / Aquaman on Smallville, also declined an offer to reprise his role in the crossover due to scheduling conflicts with Titans; however, he appeared in archive footage as Hank Hall / Hawk alongside Curran Walters as Jason Todd / Robin / Red Hood from Titans. Titans star Brenton Thwaites also declined to reprise his role as Dick Grayson / Robin / Nightwing, feeling Titans was too tonally different to the CW series and an appearance in the crossover would not have served the storylines on Titans. Osric Chau was cast as Ryan Choi later in the month, and Ashley Scott was confirmed as reprising her role as Helena Kyle / Huntress from The WB series Birds of Prey.

At the beginning of October, Audrey Marie Anderson was announced as reprising her role as Lyla Michaels, while also taking on the Harbinger persona from the comics; Lyla previously used "Harbinger" as her A.R.G.U.S. codename. That month, Stephen Lobo was cast as Jim Corrigan. By that time, the producers approached Nicolas Cage, who had been attached to portray Superman in Tim Burton's planned Superman Lives film. Guggenheim later regretted mentioning Cage and tried to refrain from hinting at other actors' involvement because he did not want fans "blowing up" their Twitter feeds with questions about why they did not appear. At the end of November, it was reported that Brec Bassinger would appear in the crossover as Courtney Whitmore / Stargirl before the release of her DC Universe series later in 2020. Robert Wuhl reprised his role as the Gotham Globe reporter Alexander Knox from Batman (1989) in a quick cameo appearance set in Earth-89. Wuhl, who had longed to reprise his role as Knox since his conspicuous absence in Batman Returns (1992), readily accepted the offer to return for just a single take of the crossover upon being approached by the executives.

Ezra Miller appeared in the Arrow episode reprising their DCEU role as Barry Allen. During development discussions for The Flash film, it was suggested that Miller appear in the crossover, and Miller immediately agreed since they "[understand] the importance of the Flash and [the character's] role in the multiverse". Roth then spoke to Guggenheim about including Miller and Guggenheim approached Gustin to see if he would be "on-board" with Miller appearing, and Gustin "was incredibly enthusiastic" about the idea; Guggenheim called Jim Lee "instrumental in making [the cameo] happen".

A number of other actors were considered and approached for cameos. There were "a whole host of reasons why" certain cameos did not occur, according to Guggenheim, as some actors were busy with other projects, some were uninterested in the crossover and others requested more money than the budget permitted, while the showrunners also had to think on those characters' screentime, their requirements in the story and the shooting schedule. Cameron Cuffe, who starred as Seg-El on the Syfy series Krypton, was approached to appear as a holographic Kryptonian elder when Argo City was evacuated. Although Cuffe said that he "wanted to make [the cameo] happen", he had committed to another project. Bringing back Teri Hatcher as Lois Lane from Lois & Clark: The New Adventures of Superman was similarly discussed by Guggenheim and the crew as an idea, but possibly scrapped due to Hatcher being unaffordable.

=== Filming ===
Production of "Crisis on Infinite Earths" began on September 24, 2019. Filming at the farmhouse for the Kent family farm was done at the end of the month; the farmhouse had previously appeared in the "Elseworlds" crossover and on Smallville. Production of the Legends of Tomorrow episode began on October 4. Williams took a break from filming Black Lightning in Atlanta to spend a week filming his parts of the crossover in Vancouver. His scenes were reviewed by the crew of Black Lightning to ensure that his characterization was consistent with the series. While on Vancouver, Wuhl arrived during one afternoon to shoot his cameo seven or eight hours later. Primary filming was completed by November 8, with re-shoots and minor filming finished by December 19. When Miller's cameo was finalized, a small crew from The Flash filmed it since the Arrow crew had already wrapped on the series and was no longer around.

Directors of the crossover included Jesse Warn (Supergirl), Laura Belsey (Batwoman), David McWhirter (The Flash), Glen Winter (Arrow), and Gregory Smith (Legends of Tomorrow). They were hired specifically for the crossover, because of their previous experience working in the Arrowverse, allowing them (and their directors of photography) to create a unified look. Batwoman, which is normally filmed with a different aspect ratio from the other series, used the same ratio as the other series for consistency. A number of stunt scenes, particularly in the Supergirl and Arrow episodes, were filmed with drones.

=== Music ===
Blake Neely and collaborators Nathaniel Blume, Sherri Chung, and Daniel Chan, began work on the crossover on November 20, 2019, and the score was recorded by an orchestra on December 2. Tony Kanal and Stephen Perkins were featured performers on the score. Neely incorporated a number of musical Easter eggs into the score, some of which were "cues the production has attempted to obtain the rights to for years"; cues included the 1960s Batman television-series theme, the 1989 Batman film theme, "hints" of the Batman: The Animated Series theme, the march theme and "Can You Read My Mind?" from the 1978 Superman film, the 1990s Flash television series theme, and the Super Friends theme.

=== Effect on the Arrowverse ===
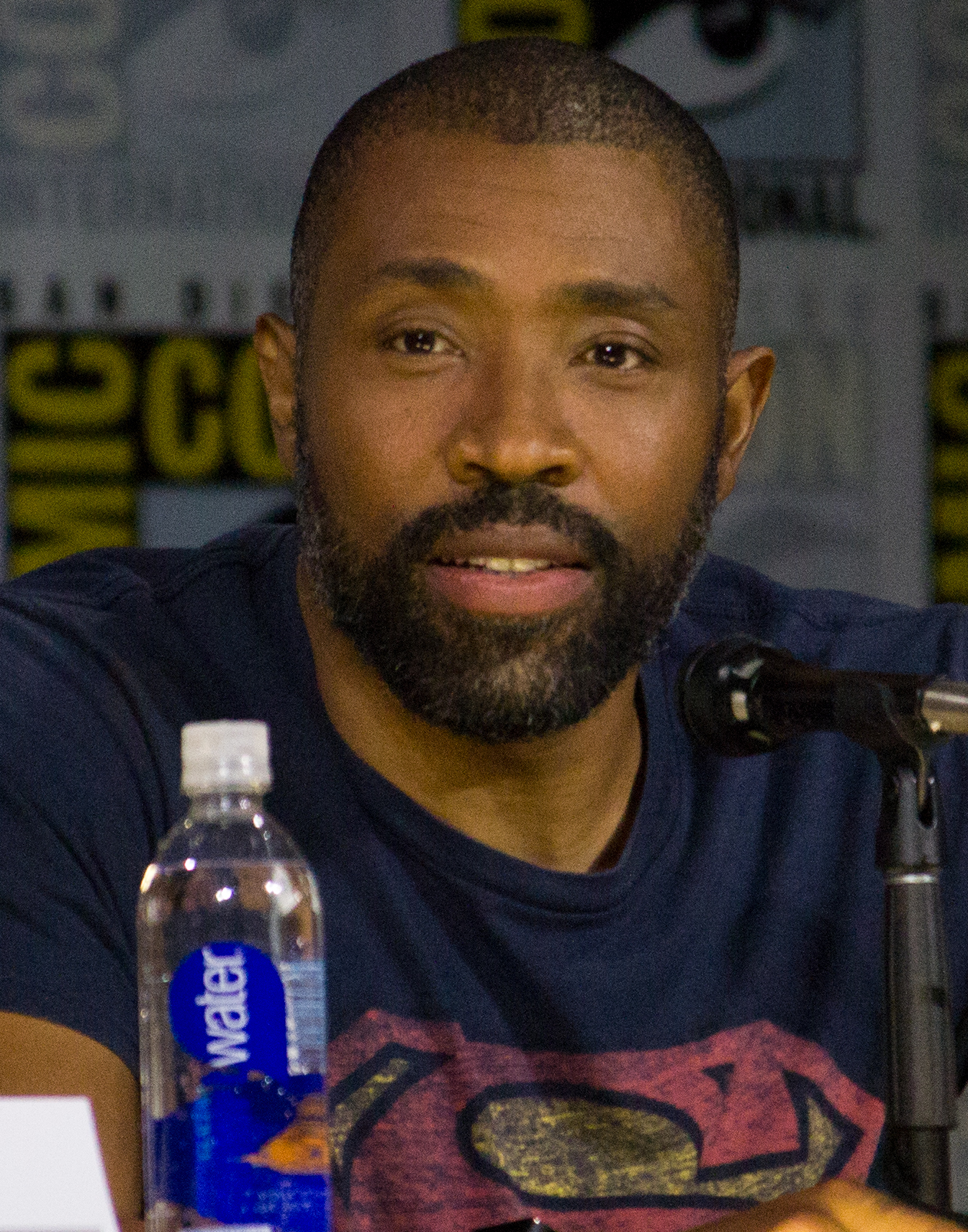
As a result of the crossover, Cress Williams' character and series was merged with the other Arrowverse series to form the new Earth-Prime.

Aiming to live up to the original comic book's promise that "worlds will live, worlds will die and things will never be the same" while simultaneously killing characters and introducing new ones, Guggenheim expected the Arrowverse's adaptation lived up to that. Before the crossover, Guggenheim told each of the series' showrunners that "there's an opportunity here to introduce some major status quo shift[s]" if they desired; this was embraced by each. He described it as not "so much a burden of fixing something, it was the freedom of being able to change whatever we wanted to change". Guggenheim added that each series would be affected except for Legends of Tomorrow, since "the crossover launches much of that season" and there would be "one rather big ramification". After the crossover, Dries wanted to "make Kate's life a little bit more integrated with all of this madness of sci-fi and aliens, and the dense mythology between" the other series, but still keep the grounding established earlier in Batwoman's season. However, this was "a little tricky because our characters aren't yet exposed to this notion of multiple universes, superheroes, powers, and stuff". An action by Barry would have ramifications for the rest of The Flash's season. The goal of the crossover for Wallace was to "tap into that feeling that the readers in 1985 would have had, when reading that story, with the tectonic shifts in the comic world, underneath". He called the Arrowverse ending a "game-changer" which "opens up to a whole new world".

By the end of the crossover, the universe was rebooted, with all of The CW series airing at the time – Arrow, The Flash, Supergirl, Legends of Tomorrow, Batwoman and Black Lightning – existing on the new Earth-Prime; this was decided going into the crossover. A new multiverse was also created, with six of its Earths revealed. Although Guggenheim had wanted a single Earth-Prime, the crossover would not have been able to visit the worlds of other DC properties had that been done. A compromise was reached in which these properties were returned to different Earths in the multiverse, and the Arrowverse series were combined in a single Earth. The Arrowverse characters are oblivious to the newly formed multiverse.

Guggenheim said that "there is an opportunity going forward after "Crisis" to slowly reveal all of the weird changes," with each series "get[ting] the chance to tell a piece of that story". Changes include John Diggle and Lyla Michaels' daughter, Sara, returning to the timeline after her change in Flashpoint, and Lex Luthor having more heroic qualities. Returning baby Sara was "very important" to Guggenheim and Schwartz to accomplish in "Crisis" after they almost did so in "Elseworlds"; it was held off until this crossover because they "thought it had more punch if it was a part of the universal reboot". Supergirl showrunners Robert Rovner and Jessica Queller came to Guggenheim with the idea to alter Lex Luthor, something they "were all really excited about". In Batwoman, Kate's sister Beth returns as a separate person from the season's antagonist Alice; Dries called this a "shocking resonance" for the series.

The inclusion of Miller's Barry Allen from the DCEU opened up more possibilities for crossovers between the DC films and Arrowverse. DC Films president Walter Hamada revealed prior to "Crisis", DC had been structured in a way that the television division had to clear the use of characters with the film division. Now, the company could "really lean into this idea of [the multiverse] and acknowledge the fact there can be a Flash on TV and one in the movies, and you don't have to pick one or the other, and they both exist in this multiverse". Berlanti agreed, feeling that "moving forward, there's more opportunity to do more things like this".

== Marketing ==
External images
- "Crisis" logo without Oliver Queen
- "Crisis" logo with Oliver Queen

Boost Mobile was a promotional partner for the event. The first teaser for the crossover was released on November 10, 2019. On November 15, The CW released a series of show-specific teasers. A week later, the event's poster was released. A full trailer was released on November 24, followed by additional trailers on December 3 and 6.

When the initial trailers were released in November, a logo with the lead character of each series (except Oliver Queen) was also released. Guggenheim said that at that time, legal and financial considerations prevented the inclusion of Amell's character in the logo. With the release of the full trailer the following month, Oliver was included in the logo. According to Guggenheim, this was due to "the creativity of a lot of very smart people" and "a loophole". He had been told that "only actors appearing in all five hours could be in the main title card", and Amell does not appear in the fifth episode, though he lends his voice for the episode's ending.

Promotional poster for the final two episodes, which was described as a "mirror" of the first poster.

A week before the last two episodes aired, a second poster for the crossover was released. Russ Burlingame of Comicbook.com said that the poster was "a mirror to the first "Crisis" poster, but centering on darkness rather than light", with different taglines used, and "the Anti-Monitor standing with his hands raised up and pointed down, whereas The Monitor had stood with his palms up and arms at his sides". Blair Marnell from SuperHero Hype noted the "prominent" placement of Supergirl and Batwoman in the poster, but pointed out both the Supermen of Earths-38 and 96 were "noticeably absent". /Film's Amelia Emberwing felt there was "a lot going on" with the new poster, saying "some of it's mundane, but other parts of it tell a story". She also noted the prominent placement of Supergirl and Batwoman, but for the other Paragons "there's not a whole lot to be told from their inclusion". Other parts Emberwing focused on was Nash Wells no longer in his Pariah costume, and John Diggle in an outfit with "a whole lot of green", hoping that meant there would be a Green Lantern nod as had been teased in the past for the character. Andy Behbakht at Screen Rant was drawn to the reveal of Oliver as the Spectre, saying the look was "heavily influenced by Oliver's latest Green Arrow costume while including the iconic cape that the Spectre wears in the comics". Writing for Inverse, Eric Francisco called out Ryan Choi's placement next to Ray Palmer, "which heavily suggests Choi will take over as the new Atom after Ray Palmer" and Black Lightning being one of the larger focuses of the poster implied his "appearance in "Part 3" was not a one-off deal".

On January 10, 2020, Amell released a trailer for the event's last two episodes. A behind-the-scenes panel moderated by Guggenheim and featuring The Flash first assistant director Phil Chipera, Batwoman costume designer Maya Mani, Legends of Tomorrow property master Lynda Chapple, and Arrowverse senior visual effects supervisor Armen Kevorkian, was part of DC FanDome in September 2020. The panel was originally supposed to feature a deleted scene from the crossover, which was ultimately not shown.

== Release ==
=== Broadcast ===
"Crisis on Infinite Earths" began with Supergirl on December 8, 2019, continuing with Batwoman and The Flash on December 9 and 10, respectively. The crossover concluded with Arrow and Legends of Tomorrow on January 14, 2020. The December 9, 2019 episode of Black Lightning tied into the event. The crossover had two largely complete scenes cut from the final broadcast. The first in the first episode had Pariah witnessing the destruction of Argo City, while the second saw Oliver Queen becoming the Spectre in an end tag of the third episode. Guggenheim called the second "a critical and important scene" but its quality came out "really ... poorly" so it was decided to be excluded from the broadcast.

"Crisis Management", a behind-the-scenes feature, was released on January 16, 2020, with the purchase of a digital season pass to any of the series. In the United Kingdom, Sky One aired the first part and third through fifth episodes daily between March 30 and April 2, 2020. E4, who acquired the rights to Batwoman in January 2020, aired the second part on August 9, 2020, as the final episode of the Batwoman season for the UK broadcast. The network chose to move the crossover episode to the end of the season instead of airing it as the original ninth episode of the season, in order to not interrupt the season story arc and confuse viewers who might not have been up to date on the other Arrowverse series.

=== Home media ===
All five episodes of "Crisis on Infinite Earths" were included on the Blu-ray release of Arrow's eighth season. Additionally, a DVD of the crossover was released in Region 2 on May 25, 2020.

=== Cancelled theatrical release ===
A theatrical release of the crossover had been planned in coordination with Warner Bros. and Fathom Events for April 2020 in the United States, which would have involved cast appearances, giveaways, and the inclusion of additional material between the episodes such as deleted scenes with completed post-production. The event did not occur because of the COVID-19 pandemic.

== Reception ==
=== Ratings ===
Viewership and ratings per episode of Crisis on Infinite Earths
No.	Series	Air date	Rating (18–49)	Viewers (millions)	DVR (18–49)	DVR viewers (millions)	Total (18–49)	Total viewers (millions)
1	Supergirl	December 8, 2019	0.7	1.67	0.4	1.00	1.0	2.67
2	Batwoman	December 9, 2019	0.6	1.71	0.4	0.98	1.0	2.68
3	The Flash	December 10, 2019	0.6	1.73	0.4	0.98	1.1	2.71
4	Arrow	January 14, 2020	0.5	1.41	0.4	1.03	0.9	2.44
5	Legends of Tomorrow	January 14, 2020	0.5	1.35	0.4	1.02	0.9	2.38

Supergirl's ratings were a season high for the series, with the rating and share on par with the first episode of "Elseworlds". Batwoman had its highest viewership since its premiere, and a season-high rating and share. The Flash also had season-high viewership, its highest since February 11, 2019, while also matching its season high rating and share. Arrow had season-high viewership and rating and share (the series' best since "Elseworlds"), and the Legends of Tomorrow episode was well above its season-four averages of 0.95 million viewers and 0.3 rating/share.

=== Critical response ===
==== Supergirl ====
The review aggregator website Rotten Tomatoes reported a 100% approval rating, based on 14 reviews, with an average rating of 8.97/10. The website's critical consensus reads: "TV's biggest crossover manages to tie these different universes together, offering plenty of cameos, dramatic moments, and surprising twists that will shake the Arrowverse forever".

Jesse Schedeen of IGN rated the first hour a 9 out of 10. Schedeen called the episode "accessible" to viewers, and said that it did not "lose sight of the personal and emotional stakes of this conflict". He felt that the Supergirl supporting cast was "utilized well" and called the episode "very critical" for fans of Arrow, given Oliver's death, although he regretted Barry's small role. Grading the episode an "A−", Entertainment Weekly's Sara Netzley said that "no amount of watching, reading, and speculating [could] truly [prepare] us for the heroism, the tears, the sacrifice, and the cameos". The A.V. Club's Caroline Siede called the episode's opening "some of the most exhilarating superhero TV I've ever seen". According to Siede, "Crisis" was the first Arrowverse crossover "to deliver an episode that feels like a meaningful part of the crossover and a meaningful part of Supergirl as well". Noting that the scene between Kara and Clark discussing Argo City's destruction felt "like Thor: Ragnarok and its 'Asgard is not a place, it's a people' ethos", she gave the episode a "B+". Giving the episode 4.5 out of 5 stars, Kayti Burt of Den of Geek called Oliver's death "a massively gutsy storytelling move"; the episode "set the stakes for the crossover journey to come". About the cast, Burt said: "By keeping the ensemble in this part of the story relatively small, we were able to spend more time with all of them, not to mention check in with the characters who are Supergirl-specific"; "one of the best scenes" was between Alex and Lena.

==== Batwoman ====
Rotten Tomatoes reported a 93% approval rating, based on 14 reviews, with an average rating of 7.69/10. The website's critical consensus reads: "Part two of DC's ambitious crossover is just as relentless as the first installment, if even smoother around the edges, masterfully juggling many characters, emotions, and Easter eggs to a satisfying result".

Schedeen called the episode "a superhero nerd's dream come true", since it "doubles down on the emotional character drama and manages to deliver some of the best live-action Superman moments in a very long time". Although he considered the Smallville moments the "epilogue fans deserve", he said that some fans would not enjoy them. Schedeen called Routh "a solid Superman and a downright terrific Clark Kent". He wrote that the second hour was less plot-driven and the crossover could be "moving too slowly for its own good", but preferred "prioritizing the character moments over the plot and spectacle". Schedeen called the Lazarus Pit subplot "an unnecessary addition to an already crowded crossover", and rated the episode an 8.8 out of 10. Chancellor Agard of Entertainment Weekly gave the episode a "B+": "Batwoman's Part 2 of the crossover succeeds where Part 1 stumbled a bit. Yes, tonight's episode was just as busy (and cameo-filled), but it flowed smoothly and all of the important beats landed". Agard credited the simple task of the heroes searching for the Paragons with why the episode worked so well, and Conroy's appearance was "truly something". Although Agard found the Smallville moments a "letdown", they eventually made sense because "Smallville was always about Clark Kent [and] his desire to live a normal life despite his powers". Alani Vargas of The A.V. Club said that "the writers did a great job of weaving in some of the most famous versions of Superman" into the episode, noting that other characters and elements from Batwoman got "the short end of the stick" in the crossover; Vargas graded the episode a "B". Den of Geek's Delia Harrington gave the episode 4 out of 5 stars.

==== The Flash ====
Rotten Tomatoes reported a 100% approval rating, based on 11 reviews, with an average rating of 9.14/10. The website's critical consensus reads:"An emotional episode that packs a surprising punch, 'Crisis on Infinite Earths' sets the stage for a heartbreaking winter premiere".

Schedeen wrote that "the cracks are definitely starting to show" with The Flash episode, highlighting the number of new characters introduced and its wide-ranging plot. He said that Ryan Choi could have been introduced before the crossover to "get some of the backstory out of the way", and the purgatory storyline "deserved far more attention" than the time allowed. According to Schedeen, it was obvious that in some scenes all the actors were not filmed together. However, "this episode never loses sight of the core appeal of Crisis": giving characters "their big moments and celebrating the connections these characters have forged". Schedeen praised the Earth-90 Flash's sacrifice, Black Lightning's introduction to the Arrowverse, Blake Neely's score, and Lucifer's cameo, rating the episode an 8 out of 10. Agard said that the Earth-90 Flash's death was a "clever way to save Grant Gustin from that fate while also wrapping up that thread in a way that was satisfying and didn't feel like a complete cheat". He liked J'onn J'onnz and Iris West having more substantial roles in this crossover than previous ones, in which they were sidelined or underutilized. To Agard, the introduction of Black Lightning was "the definition of delayed gratification. Seeing Cress interact with everyone in this scene was something to behold because we've been waiting for it to happen and, more importantly, the script does a good job of synthesizing who this guy is to non-Black Lightning viewers". Grading the episode an "A−", he concluded: "Overall, I kind of loved this episode. Sure, it definitely moved a bit too quickly and I lost track of the story at times. But it had an immense heart to it. Not only that, but it also improved on what Part 2 did".

The A.V. Club's Scott Von Doviak also awarded the episode an "A−", calling the crossover "a hot mess, there's no question about it. To call it overstuffed would be an understatement ... There are five-minute subplots here that could have been entire episodes of the various series making up the Arrowverse, and the whole thing feels like it could fly apart like the Flash on the cosmic treadmill at any moment. But that's what makes it so much fun". Von Doviak called the purgatory subplot rushed, and the killing of Earth-90 Flash made "all the angst of the first half of the [Flash] season feel a little cheap". He called the episode's ending "kind of a ripoff of Avengers: Infinity War ... but as far as cliffhangers to hold us until after the holidays go, it'll do". Giving the episode 5 out of 5 stars, Mike Cecchini of Den of Geek wrote that the crossover and this episode succeeded in "deliver[ing] 100+ episodes worth of emotional and narrative payoff" as "the climax of the single most ambitious crossover in television history".

==== Arrow and Legends of Tomorrow ====
For the Arrow episode, Rotten Tomatoes reported a 79% approval rating, based on 14 reviews, with an average rating of 7.4/10. The website's critical consensus reads: ""Crisis on Infinite Earths"'s fourth installment reshuffles the universe in rousing fashion thanks to Arrow himself and a delightful cameo from Ezra Miller, even if repeating the same sacrifice twice dilutes the impact of this farewell to Oliver Queen". It reported a 100% approval rating for the Legends of Tomorrow episode, based on 8 reviews, with an average rating of 9.84/10.

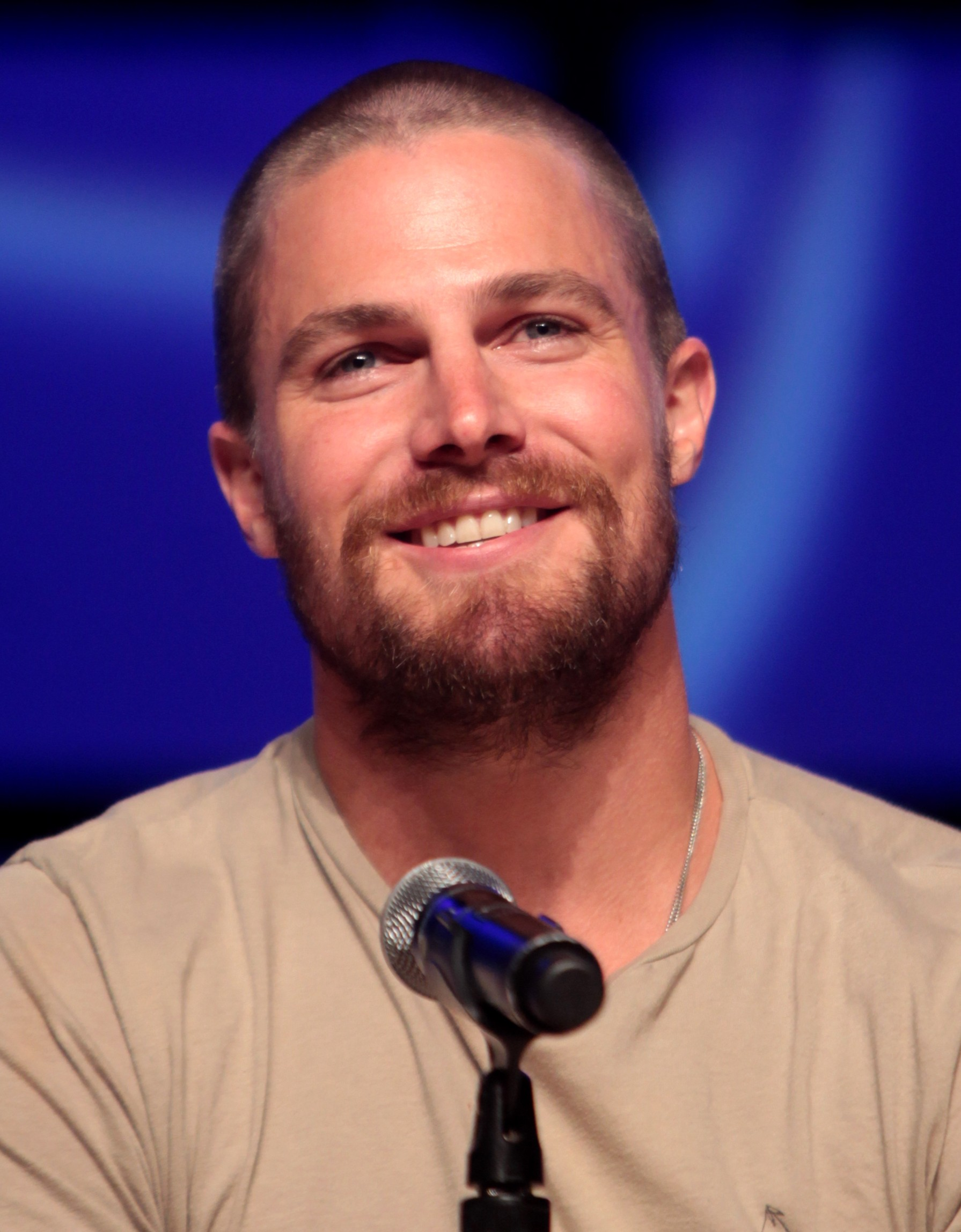
Stephen Amell's performance in the Arrow episode was mostly praised.

Schedeen rated the final two installments a 9 out of 10: "The final two chapters of "Crisis on Infinite Earths" cement this crossover as the most entertaining and most ambitious Arrowverse adventure yet". Concerned that the crossover would buckle under its own weight in part three, Schedeen was glad in the Arrow episode that its "consolidating [of] the cast down to a handful of heroes and a few cosmic entities really help[ed] refocus and remind viewers of what's at stake". Although he enjoyed seeing the human side of the Monitor, he could not say the same for the Anti-Monitor, who was just "a faceless threat and an obligatory, all-powerful punching bag in these final two episodes". Schedeen called Oliver's sacrifice "a fitting end" to the character, justifying the decision to resurrect him after his sacrifice in the first part. It did "even more to bring the character full circle and complete his arc. Ollie's story has always been about the sacrifices he makes for the greater good and what better way to end that story than by having the Arrowverse's first hero give his life so that its best heroes can continue the fight?" About the Legends episode, he wrote that the "finale manages to deftly balance the whimsical, self-aware tone of Legends with the gravitas needed as our heroes confront the Anti-Monitor one last time". Schedeen wrote that part five "manages to juggle its many moving parts elegantly", and he enjoyed the ending scene and the creation of the Arrowverse's version of the Justice League.

About part four, Agard wrote that the Speed Force flashbacks were "very cheesy and reminiscent of things Arrow has done in the past. On the other hand, I found it very effective in putting us in the mindset for the final battle and, more importantly, the end of Arrow ... [T]his episode honors his connection to the other shows and how this one show's existence has created so much". Oliver's death in this episode "packed way more of an emotional punch [over the one in part one] because of the three actors' performances". About the Legends episode, Agard was "surprised by how strong" it was: "The last episode of a crossover is usually the weakest because the big battle ends up taking precedence over character moments, but that's not the case here at all". He graded both episodes an "A−". Delia Harrington of Den of Geek called the final two episodes "very different, but equally compelling". Harrington praised Amell and Benoist's performances, and enjoyed the final episodes' cameos and Easter eggs. Like Agard, she found that Oliver's death in these episodes "was much more in line with what his character deserved". About part five, Harrington said: "The governing principle of this episode was the banana pants aesthetic of Legends, and that's exactly what it needed," noting the appearance of the giant Beebo. Giving the episodes 4 out of 5 stars, she concluded: "For those of us who were touting Arrow as the best superhero property on any screen, big or small, back in Season 1, this is truly the television equivalent to Endgame-level storytelling. Some of the old heroes are gone. New heroes rise in their place. The fandom mourns, but we also get to celebrate all the new stories there are to tell".

Kate Kulzick of The A.V. Club was more negative on the Arrow episode, giving it a "C−". She said, "Arrow's contribution to the crossover not only fails to live up to the dramatic stakes of that cliffhanger, it sours the goodwill generated by the first three episodes, retreading old ground and sending the crossover limping into its finale". Kulzick was disappointed that the Monitor and Anti-Monitor's godlike powers were poorly explained, and called the Speed Force moments "arbitrary" in what could have been "a wonderful opportunity to relive and re-imagine high points from each of the Arrowverse shows' histories". In the approach to the final battle between the Paragons and Anti-Monitor, she felt that the episode "really starts to flounder". Unlike Agard and Harrington, Kulzick called Oliver's death "a pale shadow of the raw and emotional end of part one", and "one hell of a disappointing way to send [him] out". The A.V. Club's Allison Shoemaker called some of the concepts in the Legends episode "flimsy": "The plot is fine. The characters and their reactions to what's happened, to that loss and the new status quo, is what really hits home". Highlighting Barry and Sara's conversation, followed by Sara and Diggle's, Shoemaker graded the episode a "B+".

== Crisis Aftermath ==
Crisis Aftermath is an aftershow which aired after the December 8 Supergirl episode and the December 10 Flash episode. The show, which went "in-depth to explore" the crossover, was hosted by Kevin Smith. Entertainment Weekly helped develop the aftershow, which included discussions with executive producers Guggenheim, Dries, Rovner, Shimizu, and Wallace; the stars Cryer, Garrett, McNamara, and Conroy; and panel guest Dani Fernandez, among others. Entertainment Weekly writer Chancellor Agard appeared in a segment "helping to break down the multiversal destruction" seen in the crossover.

Episodes of Crisis Aftermath
No.	Guests	Original release date	U.S. viewers (millions)
1	Marc Guggenheim, Dani Fernandez, Katherine McNamara, LaMonica Garrett, Chancellor Agard, Robert Rovner, Caroline Dries, Marc Bernardin	December 8, 2019	0.67
2	Marc Guggenheim, Dani Fernandez, Jon Cryer, Eric Wallace, Chancellor Agard, Kevin Conroy, Robert Wuhl, Geoff Johns, Keto Shimizu	December 10, 2019	0.72
