= Meet the Legends =

- Legends of Tomorrow episode
- Episode no.: Season 5 Episode 1
- Directed by: Kevin Mock
- Written by: Grainne Godfree; James Eagan
- Production code: T13.21901
- Original air date: January 21, 2020

Guest appearances
- Adam Tsekhman as Gary Green; Shayan Sobhian as Behrad Tarazi; Ramona Young as Mona Wu; Michael Eklund as Grigori Rasputin

Episode chronology
← Previous "Crisis on Infinite Earths: Part Five"	Next → "Miss Me, Kiss Me, Love Me"
- Legends of Tomorrow (season 5)

"Meet the Legends" is the first episode of the fifth season of the American science fiction television series Legends of Tomorrow, revolving around the eponymous team of superheroes and their time travelling adventures. It is set in the Arrowverse, sharing continuity with the other television series of the universe. The episode was written by Grainne Godfree and James Eagan, and directed by Kevin Mock. It was the 69th episode overall.

Caity Lotz stars as Sara Lance / White Canary as she tries to prevent a serial killer from murdering people at a high school reunion. It uses a mockumentary format. The episode was met with praise by critics.

== Plot ==
Following the battle at Hey World and Neron's defeat, the Legends have become public heroes. With the Time Bureau dismantled, Ava Sharpe joins the Legends and allows a documentary crew to film them so they can prove to the government that the Legends are not a threat. Sara, Ray, and Mick Rory return from the Crisis, but Sara has yet to come to terms with Oliver Queen's death. (Note: As depicted in "Crisis on Infinite Earths, Part 5") Suddenly, a timequake takes place, leading the Legends to 1917 Russia, where Grigori Rasputin has returned from the dead. The Legends fail to convince Rasputin to kill his killer, so they return to the Waverider, but leave a film crew member behind. As a result, the Legends form a plan to stop Rasputin and rescue the crew member before returning to 2020. They then release the documentary to the world, before claiming the film was faked. Meanwhile, in 2020, John Constantine and Gary Green investigate a demon named Masher, who possessed a child in Star City. Constantine performs an exorcism, freeing the child and sending Masher back to Hell. Constantine also returns to Hell, Mick quits writing and passes on his career to Mona Wu, and Nate sees an old message from Zari Tomaz, asking him to find her in the new timeline.

== Production ==
The episode was the first of the season to be produced; however, it was the second to air following "Crisis on Infinite Earths: Part Five". Filming began on July 15, 2019 and concluded on July 30. The episode was written by Grainne Godfree and James Eagan. The episode in mockumentary format.

=== Casting ===
The episode stars Caity Lotz, Tala Ashe, Jes Macallan, Nick Zano, Matt Ryan, Brandon Routh, Dominic Purcell, Maisie Richardson-Sellers, Olivia Swann, and Amy Louise Pemberton (voice), as Sara Lance, Zari Tomaz, Nate Haywood, John Constantine, Ray Palmer, Mick Rory, Charlie, Astra Louge, and Gideon. Principal cast member Courtney Ford does not appear in the episodoe.

This is the first episode in which Ramona Young does not appear as a series regular since she join the cast in the fourth season as Mona Wu. Young instead appears as a guest star as she does in the season finale. Adam Tsekhman and Michael Eklund also guest star as Gary Green and Gigori Rasputin respectively.

Shayan Sobhian makes his second appearance as Behrad Tarazi after the characters debut in the season four finale, "Hey World!".

== Release ==
=== Broadcast ===
"Meet the Legends" was first aired in the United States on The CW on January 21, 2020. It was watched by 720 thousand viewers with a 0.3 share among adults aged 18 to 49.

=== Critical reception ===
"Meet the Legends" was met with positive reception from critics. In a Den of Geek review by Jim Dandeneau, he stated that the episode was possibly one of the best episode of Legends of Tomorrow. IGN's Jesse Schedeen gave the episode a 7 out of 10 saying that it was a good episode the humor was overdone. Writing for TVFanatic, Sarah Little praised Caity Lotz in her portrayal of Sara grief after losing Oliver.

Allison Shoemaker of The A.V. Club praised the episode for the way it handled reintroducing the Legends post-crisis, the review was paired with a B+. She compared the episode to the Arrow episode "Emerald Archer" feeling that it pulled off the mockumentary format much better.
