= Batwoman season 1 =

Batwoman
- Season 1
- Home media cover
- Starring: Ruby Rose; Rachel Skarsten; Meagan Tandy; Nicole Kang; Camrus Johnson; Elizabeth Anweis; Dougray Scott
- No. of episodes: 20

Release
- Original network: The CW
- Original release: October 6, 2019 – May 17, 2020

Season chronology
- Next → Season 2

The first season of the American television series Batwoman premiered on The CW on October 6, 2019, and consisted of 20 episodes. The series is based on the DC Comics character Kate Kane / Batwoman, a costumed vigilante created by Geoff Johns, Grant Morrison, Greg Rucka, Mark Waid, and Keith Giffen. It is set in the Arrowverse, sharing continuity with other Arrowverse television series. The showrunner for this season is Caroline Dries.

Ruby Rose stars as Kate, and is joined by main cast members Rachel Skarsten, Meagan Tandy, Nicole Kang, Camrus Johnson, Elizabeth Anweis and Dougray Scott. Rose previously appeared as a guest actor in the fifth annual Arrowverse crossover. Batwoman was picked up for a full season by The CW in October 2019, and filming took place primarily in Vancouver, British Columbia. Production was shut down in March 2020 due to the COVID-19 pandemic, leaving the season with only 20 of the planned 22 episodes.

The series premiere was watched by 1.86 million viewers and had a 0.5 18–49 demographic rating. It is the only season to feature Rose, who left the series ahead of the second season.

== Episodes ==
Season one episodes
No. overall	No. in season	Title	Directed by	Written by	Original release date	Prod. code	U.S. viewers (millions)
1	1	"Pilot"	Marcos Siega	Caroline Dries	October 6, 2019	T15.10154	1.86
Three years after the disappearance of Gotham City-based vigilante Batman, Jacob Kane and his private security firm the Crows preside over a gala led by Mayor Michael Akins to turn off the Bat-Signal. At the height of the festivities, Alice and the Wonderland Gang crash the event and abduct Crows operative Sophie Moore, prompting Jacob's stepdaughter Mary to call his biological daughter, Kate. Returning from overseas, Kate learns Alice is targeting her father and sets out to locate her cousin, billionaire Bruce Wayne. She discovers, however, that Bruce is Batman, who she blamed for failing to save her sister and mother after they died in a car crash. Realizing there's more to the story, she dons her cousin's Batsuit, altered by Wayne Enterprises employee Luke Fox, before rescuing Sophie and foiling Alice's plan to detonate a bomb in a crowded park. The next day, as the news reports on what they believe is Batman's return, Kate begins to suspect Alice is her fraternal twin sister, Beth, who she believed was dead.
2	2	"The Rabbit Hole"	Marcos Siega	Caroline Dries	October 13, 2019	T13.21952	1.45
Kate's growing suspicions about Alice's identity drive a wedge between her and Jacob, who firmly believes Beth is dead based on the evidence. While trying to get Alice's favorite knife tested for DNA, she comes under attack from a group of thugs that manage to steal it back. Deducing one of Alice's injured men used Mary's secret clinic, Kate frees him to give Alice a message. Kate then asks Sophie to buy her time while she meets with Alice, who refuses to directly admit she is Beth, but agrees to provide a DNA sample. Sophie tells Jacob where to find them, resulting in Alice being transported to Arkham Asylum. Alice tells Kate she tasked her boyfriend, ex-Crows agent Dodgson, with killing Mary; prompting Kate to save her before rescuing Alice from a bomb intended to kill her before both Kate and Alice escape from the police. Meanwhile, Kate's stepmother, Catherine, orders the thugs she tasked with stealing Alice's knife to destroy it. After interrogating Dodgson, Kate finds a parcel containing a live bat and a note from Alice that implies she knows her identity.
3	3	"Down, Down, Down"	Dermott Daniel Downs	Holly Henderson & Don Whitehead	October 20, 2019	T13.21953	1.22
Bruce's former childhood friend, Thomas Elliot, leaves Kate an invitation to a gala celebrating the purchase of the building overlooking Wayne Tower. Around the same time, a railgun designed to penetrate the Batsuit is stolen from a Wayne Enterprises facility. Kate correctly infers that Elliot is the thief, having learned Bruce's true identity and intends to kill Batman for saving his mother years earlier, delaying his inheritance. When he takes hostages to force Batman out, Kate confronts him in a modified suit, adopting the persona of Batwoman as she rescues the hostages and disables the railgun. Alice subdues Elliot to save a cornered Batwoman, but they part on less than amicable terms while the Crows take Elliot to Arkham Asylum. Elsewhere, Sophie finds herself pondering her relationship with Kate, but dismisses them after entering a relationship with a bartender, Reagan. Catherine finds playing cards left by Alice in her bedroom, demanding Jacob deal with her despite his concerns that she might be Beth. Gotham publicly learns about Batwoman.
4	4	"Who Are You?"	Holly Dale	Nancy Kiu & Denise Harkavy	October 27, 2019	T13.21954	1.29
Kate's relationship with Reagan complicates her efforts to catch jewel thief Magpie, who has stolen Martha Wayne's necklace, and puts her newfound status as Gotham's protector in question. When Dodgson develops an infection during his captivity, Batwoman drops him off with Mary for treatment. While he is drugged with morphine, Mary impersonates Alice and gets him to reveal part of her plan: a mysterious figure named Mouse. After getting the necklace back, Batwoman foils Magpie's latest heist at a museum gala; allowing the Crows to arrest her and take her to Blackgate Penitentiary. Recognizing that she cannot be in an honest relationship, Kate breaks up with Reagan. To provide a cover for her vigilantism, Kate sets up a company to buy dilapidated buildings and turn them into low-cost housing with Luke as her assistant. Meanwhile, Alice meets with Catherine at Beth's grave and demands she turn over an experimental weapon; threatening to tell Jacob the truth about Beth. Catherine confesses to Jacob that she used a deer skull in place of Beth's, causing him to storm out.
5	5	"Mine Is a Long and a Sad Tale"	Carl Seaton	Jerry Shandy & Ebony Gilbert	November 3, 2019	T13.21955	1.16
Alice is linked to a series of skin thefts in Gotham, so Kate captures her and gives her the chance to explain herself, while also leaving Jacob and Sophie a trail to follow. The sisters travel to the rural area where Beth was last seen. A series of flashbacks show Beth being rescued from drowning and subsequently being held captive by a man who wants her to be a companion for his disfigured son, Jonathan Cartwright, who will later become Mouse. Catherine tells Mary the truth about her deception and she storms into Wayne Enterprises in a drunken stupor. Luke calms her by letting her assist with his skin theft investigation, learning that they are connected to several escaped Arkham prisoners. Alice drugs Kate and locks her in Mouse's home. When Jacob and Sophie show up after subduing Dodgson and the Wonderland Gang members with him, Alice stabs her father. Kate escapes, takes Mouse captive with Sophie's help, and forces him and Alice to leave. Jacob recovers, but now fully accepts that Alice is Beth. Alice promises Mouse, who she calls her "brother", that she will help him become whoever he wants to be.
6	6	"I'll Be Judge, I'll Be Jury"	Scott Peters	James Stoteraux & Chad Fiveash	November 10, 2019	T13.21956	1.09
A vigilante calling himself the "Executioner" begins targeting law enforcement and judicial officials he deems to be corrupt. Alice has Mouse impersonate Catherine's researcher Dean Devereaux to steal the weapon she refused to turn over. However, Alice convinces him not to as she still needs him for an upcoming tea party. When he discovers that the Coil Accelerator was intended to kill Batwoman, Mouse feels betrayed and confronts Alice; believing she wants to protect her sister while killing Deveraux. Sophie deduces Batwoman's identity, but is injured by the Executioner during his latest attack; forcing Kate to take her to Mary. A flash drive is located, which proves the Executioner's claims to be true. This upsets Luke, as he fears it would allow his father, Lucius', killer to request a re-trial. Sophie escapes, but not before Mary urges her not to reveal Batwoman's identity. Jacob manages to kill the Executioner, only to be caught in one of his traps. After Batwoman saves him, he tells her he was wrong to blame Batman for what happened to Beth and his wife.
7	7	"Tell Me the Truth"	Michael A. Allowitz	Caroline Dries & Natalie Abrams	November 17, 2019	T13.21957	1.01
Kate runs into her old friend, Julia Pennyworth, while on the trail of a professional assassin called "The Rifle". Sophie threatens to tell Jacob Kate's identity unless she ceases her vigilantism. The Rifle meets with Alice and hands over a mysterious vial as he mentions his boss Safiyah. Kate invites Sophie to a local restaurant, where their show of affection upsets the homophobic owner. When they leave, Sophie confesses that Jacob was the one who convinced her to end their relationship, putting her on the path to where she is now. Catherine goes to see Jacob, who reluctantly agrees to hold off filing for divorce. Julia poses as Batwoman so Kate can trick Sophie, but winds up captured by the Crows when the Rifle ambushes her with the Coil Accelerator. Kate breaks her out and Sophie concludes that she was wrong. Nevertheless, Kate tells her it's best they stop seeing each other. After purchasing a space, Kate and Mary open a gay bar. Jacob meets with Alice, revealing himself as Mouse, while the Rifle leaves for the Mediterranean with Julia in pursuit as the real Jacob returns from upstate. Alice puts the next stage of her plan in action.
8	8	"A Mad Tea-Party"	Holly Dale	Nancy Kiu	December 1, 2019	T13.21959	1.01
Alice has Jacob abducted while Mouse sequesters Sophie and Tyler as her plan unfolds. On Alice's orders, disguised Wonderland Gang members replace the security detail assigned to protect Gotham's Humanitarian Ball, where Catherine is to be awarded. Alice rewrites her speech, making her confess to numerous crimes before collapsing. Alice tells a captured Catherine and Mary they have been poisoned by a toxin developed by the former's company and there is only enough antidote for one. Catherine compels Mary to take it, expressing how proud of her she is before she dies. As Batwoman neutralizes the Wonderland Gang, she nearly strangles Alice in anger upon learning of her actions. However Mouse, disguised as Jacob, stuns Batwoman to exfil Alice. Jacob awakes to find himself framed for Catherine's death and arrested by Commissioner Forbes. Furious that Kate chose to believe in Alice, Mary is left devastated by her mother's death. Tired of doubting, Tyler asks Sophie to decide whether she loves him or Kate. As Kate visits Jacob, both agree Alice is beyond saving and must be stopped. Meanwhile in Central City, Nash Wells uncovers a wall of symbols before a blinding light pulls him inside.
9	9	"Crisis on Infinite Earths: Part Two"	Laura Belsey	Don Whitehead & Holly Henderson	December 9, 2019	T13.21958	1.71
To aid the heroes, Harbinger recruits Earth-74's Mick Rory and his Waverider. After Oliver Queen's death, the Monitor consults the Book of Destiny and learns of seven Paragons. Two are Sara Lance, Paragon of Destiny and Kara Danvers, Paragon of Hope but, to find two more, Clark Kent, Lois Lane, and Iris West-Allen must locate a Superman who has suffered "more than any mortal man" while Kate and Kara search for the "Bat of the Future", complicated by Lex Luthor stealing the Book in order to kill Supermen across the multiverse. When he finds Earth-96's Superman at the same time as Clark's team, he forces the Kryptonians to fight each other until Lois stops him. Meanwhile, Kate and Kara locate Earth-99's Bruce Wayne, an aged killer, but fail to convince him to join them. A heated confrontation erupts wherein Bruce is accidentally electrocuted. Elsewhere, Sara, Barry Allen, Mia Smoak, and John Constantine take Oliver's body to a Lazarus Pit to resurrect him, but it fails. Back on the Waverider, Ray Palmer builds a "Paragon detector", which identifies Kate as the "Bat of the Future". Unbeknownst to everyone, Harbinger is approached by the Anti-Monitor. Note : This episode continues a crossover event that begins on Supergirl season 5 episode 9, continues on The Flash season 6 episode 9 and Arrow season 8 episode 8, and concludes on Legends of Tomorrow's special episode.
10	10	"How Queer Everything Is Today!"	Jeffrey Hunt	Caroline Dries	January 19, 2020	T13.21960	0.79
Following Catherine's death and Jacob's arrest, Mary tries to find an expert to testify in Jacob's defense and continues to distance herself from Kate while Sophie takes command of the Crows. After Batwoman saves a hacked train from crashing, the perpetrator demands a large sum of money as ransom or they will release all of Gotham's secrets online. Luke tracks the culprit to Gotham Prep, where Batwoman learns it was a lesbian student named Parker Torres, who was outed to her heteronormative parents by an ex-girlfriend and hoped to leave Gotham with the blackmail money. Alice breaks into the school, abducts Parker, and forces Batwoman to unmask herself to Parker or else she will murder her. She also threatens the school with a bomb and attempts to force Parker to out Batwoman's identity, but Parker contacts the Crows and GCPD instead, who evacuate the building and arrest Alice. Afterwards, Kate offers Parker emotional support and reconciles with Mary. Batwoman later comes out as a lesbian superhero in an interview with Kara. Jacob has encounters with a tough inmate named Reggie Harris. When she returns to Wayne Tower, Kate meets a doppelgänger of Beth, who happily greets her.
11	11	"An Un-Birthday Present"	Mairzee Almas	Chad Fiveash & James Stoteraux	January 26, 2020	T13.21961	0.67
In flashbacks, Beth was shown to have an improving friendship with Mouse, but his father August Cartwright did not approve and got her involved in his latest project. In the present, Kate tries to clear things up with the second Beth; who got displaced from her Earth following the Crisis. To free Alice, Mouse kidnaps Commissioner Forbes' and Mayor Akins' sons before he and the Wonderland Gang intercept Kate before she can become Batwoman. Using a code Kate and Sophie learned, Sophie refuses to yield to Mouse's demands. In an attempt to fool Alice, Luke and Mary disguise the second Beth as Alice to buy Kate time to break free. When "Alice" does not use the proper code, Mouse captures her. Kate breaks free, subdues the Wonderland Gang, and injures Mouse before rescuing the hostages. Alice gets out before she can be taken to Arkham, telling Sophie she has her own demons to deal with. With Mouse under heavy guard in the ICU, protestors appear outside GCPD, demanding they light the Bat-Signal as Batwoman arrives. Later, Kate celebrates her birthday with Luke, Mary, and Beth. Suddenly, both Beth and Alice simultaneously suffer from migraines.
12	12	"Take Your Choice"	Tara Miele	Ebony Gilbert	February 16, 2020	T13.21962	0.85
Sophie and Jacob petition Dr. Campbell for his testimony, who agrees if he can examine Mouse. Alice visits Mouse and learns of her doppelgänger as she continues to suffer from migraines. When she meets her in Wayne Tower, Beth theorizes that only one of them can be saved. Remembering that Mary's blood has the "cure-all" antidote, Alice attacks her at her clinic to save herself, but Mary leaves Alice handcuffed to a clinic bed and escapes to give her blood to Kate so she can save Beth. Meanwhile, Jacob is attacked by Dodgson, then saved by Reggie, who expects him to repay him before the other prisoners find out. Campbell visits Mouse in the ICU, revealing himself as August. Exfiltrating Mouse posed as a guard, August leaves him bound in an unknown location so he can target Alice. After giving Beth the blood sample, Kate attends to a weakened Alice while Luke gets Beth away from the Crows. Though Sophie follows, ready to kill Beth, she chooses to call for an arrest. August snipes Beth instead, mistaking her for Alice, allowing Alice herself to quickly recover and knock out Kate.
13	13	"Drink Me"	Dermott Daniel Downs	Jerry Shandy	February 23, 2020	T13.21963	0.82
With the truth of Catherine's murder disclosed, Jacob is cleared of all charges and regains control of the Crows. At night, people are targeted by a vampire named Nocturna. When Batwoman finds her latest victim, Nocturna stuns her with ketamine before taking a sample of her blood. Sophie helps Batwoman before the Crows find her; advising her to keep her distance. Mary treats Kate before the latter works with Jacob to draw out Nocturna. After speaking with Kate, Alice replaces the missing Mouse with a mannequin before she is attacked by Nocturna. Using facial recognition, Luke recognizes Nocturna as Natalia Knight, who suffers from porphyria. Kate finds Alice just as Nocturna attacks Mary. Alice donates her blood to save Mary before Kate confronts Nocturna and defeats her with a forensic UV light. Jacob confronts Sophie after viewing footage of her helping Batwoman and implores her to pick a side before suspending her until further notice. Mary remembers finding ketamine in Kate's system, and realizes she is Batwoman while Alice realizes Campbell is actually August. Kate visits Sophie by the Bat-Signal and they share a kiss.
14	14	"Grinning from Ear to Ear"	Michael Blundell	Denise Harkavy	March 8, 2020	T13.21964	0.75
In flashbacks, Duela Dent struggles with making her face look "normal", so she smashes a mirror and uses its shards to cut her face. In the present, Duela targets social media influencers. Still suspended, Sophie's mother visits her. Upon learning of her current relationship issues however, she leaves disappointed. August hooks up Mouse to a fear toxin canister and tells him he killed Alice. While investigating Duela, Batwoman determines her next target, Myrtle, and narrowly saves the girl's mother after Duela attacks her. Following this, Luke discovers Myrtle changed her name to Veronica May and Duela's victims were all connected to Dr. Campbell. Batwoman and Sophie later find Duela just as she is to drop Veronica in acid. While Batwoman rescues the latter, Sophie subdues the former and leaves her for the police. However, Alice gets to Duela first and steals her face so she can kidnap Dr. Campbell and reveal she knows his true identity. Meanwhile, as Luke feared, Reggie's lawyer, Bobby Reeves, visits him to establish his client's re-trial date in light of new evidence. Amidst this, Jacob finds himself questioning the circumstances behind Lucius' death.
15	15	"Off with Her Head"	Holly Dale	Natalie Abrams	March 15, 2020	T13.21965	0.75
In flashbacks, Gabi Kane gave her daughters necklaces that matched her earrings. During her time with August, Beth endured torments from his mother Mabel, her "Queen of Hearts". Taking notice of Mabel's earrings, she traced them to a locked refrigerator containing Gabi's head. In retaliation, Beth turned Mabel's oxygen tank into a makeshift flamethrower. In the present, Batwoman finds a bound August near the Bat-Signal and alerts Jacob, who is unwilling to alert the police after what Forbes did to him. When he asks about the second Beth, Kate claims she was a "skin thief" to hide her true nature while Luke and Mary track down her killer. Meanwhile, Alice finds Mouse and frees him, but he hooks her up to the canister and flees, believing she's his greatest fear. Under the effects of the fear toxin, Alice hallucinates a zombified Mabel tormenting her before she breaks free. Jacob arrives soon after while looking for Mouse and uses adrenaline to save her before arresting her. Enraged by what August did to Beth and her mother, Kate accidentally strangles him to death, much to Jacob's dismay as he returns with Alice.
16	16	"Through the Looking-Glass"	Sudz Sutherland	Nancy Kiu	March 22, 2020	T13.21966	0.77
As Jacob buries August's body, Alice escapes with his gun. She returns to the Wonderland Gang hideout hoping to find Mouse, only to find her gang murdered and a threatening note from Safiyah. She convinces Kate to help her find Mouse, promising to leave Gotham afterwards. They visit a nurse who treated Mouse, only to find the Crows taking him to Arkham. Following a disagreement and fight, Kate agrees to help Alice break him out. They retrieve Mouse's cell key from Dr. Butler, but when Alice goes to free him, Kate locks her in; revealing she was part of a sting operation with Jacob to capture her. Meanwhile, Jacob instructs Sophie to investigate Lucius' death after hearing of Reggie's re-trial. A sniper nearly kills her, but Julia saves her. Luke and Mary attend Reggie's court hearing, where he is granted his re-trial and released. Luke confronts him, but Reggie claims he was set up before he gets shot. Sophie later informs Jacob that two people connected to Lucius' case have turned up dead before the hitman nearly kills him. He defeats him, but the hitman dies from his injuries before he can be interrogated.
17	17	"A Narrow Escape"	Paul Wesley	Daphne Miles	April 26, 2020	T13.21967	0.63
Struggling with having killed August, Kate does not suit up for a week. Meanwhile, a past criminal called the Detonator resurfaces; placing people in bomb vests. Kate confronts George Adler, who confirms his deceased father was the original Detonator. Reeves falls victim next, so he contacts the Crows, who work with the GCPD to evacuate Mary's clinic. After Kate rescues Mary, she reveals she knows Batwoman's identity. When Jacob becomes the Detonator's latest target, Kate realizes that Crows agent Robles is responsible. Batwoman intercepts him and learns he is typing up loose ends concerning Lucius' murder and that the latest bomb is in Wayne Enterprises' underground parking garage. There, Batwoman discovers that Robles was paid by Elliot to get Lucius' journals, leading to his accidental death and Reggie being framed. Luke overhears and Kate stops him from taking vengeance, admitting that she killed August. Luke places the building on lockdown, limiting the blast radius. Jacob reinstates Sophie while Julia is transferred to the Crows. Meanwhile, Alice and Mouse, disguised as Butler, decide to take over Arkham to keep themselves safe from Safiyah.
18	18	"If You Believe in Me, I'll Believe in You"	James Bamford	James Stoteraux & Chad Fiveash	May 3, 2020	T13.21968	0.64
Batwoman plans to go after Lucius' journal, which is currently being held by Elliot's associate, Johnny Sabatino. With Luke's assistance in the Batcave, Kate and Julia infiltrate Sabatino's club, only to get captured. In response, Luke is forced to ask Mary for help in rescuing them. Meanwhile, Alice agrees to give Elliot a new face in exchange for the journal and to keep the Crows from putting him on trial. As Sabatino refuses to give up the journal however, Alice sends Magpie to retrieve it while she and Mouse work on Elliot's new face. The Crows later visit Arkham and find what appears to be Elliot hanged in his cell. As Julia is being tortured, Sabatino auctions off the chance to kill Batwoman. However, Mary frees Batwoman while Julia frees herself before they defeat the criminals and retrieve Lucius' journal before Magpie. After meeting Reagan at the club, Kate has a one-night stand with her, only to find the journal missing the next morning. Elsewhere, Reagan gives it to Magpie, who in turn gives it to Alice. While pouring over the journal however, she and Mouse discover it has been written in code.
19	19	"A Secret Kept from All the Rest"	Greg Beeman	Jerry Shandy & Kelly Larson	May 10, 2020	T13.21969	0.70
Kate storms Reagan's apartment and learns who she gave the journal to. Taking up the identity of Hush, Elliot abducts members of Gotham's Intelligentsia to decipher the journal on Alice's behalf and kills them when they fail to. He nearly abducts Parker, but Batwoman interferes; forcing him to escape. In response, Alice sends Hush after Luke and Julia. With help from Mary and Parker, Batwoman confronts Alice and offers Lucius' glasses in exchange for their safety. Once she gets what she needs from the journal, Alice releases Arkham's inmates and destroys Mouse's disguise before escaping into the tunnels. Following the incident, Jacob warns Batwoman that a war will start between her and the Crows should she ever resurface. Julia tells Kate that she was after the book for the Rifle's boss, Safiyah Sohail, but called off the deal after learning what it does. In the sewers, Alice continues reading through the journal and orders her associates to procure Kryptonite.
20	20	"O, Mouse!"	Amanda Tapping	Holly Henderson & Don Whitehead	May 17, 2020	T13.21970	0.74
Jacob and Batwoman confront Arkham escapee Tim "The Titan" Teslow, only to be defeated. Mouse shows Alice a mobile app developed for people to send alerts to the Crows. After learning that Kryptonite can pierce the Batsuit, Luke shows Kate a shard of Kryptonite that Bruce had; intent on destroying it before it falls into the wrong hands. Batwoman meets with Tim's brother, Apollo, to warn him, but Tim attacks and kills him. Mary lights the Bat-Signal to get Jacob's attention and convince him to call a truce with Batwoman to stop Tim. Alice kills Mouse when he begins to affect her plans. Batwoman and the Crows lure Tim to Gotham Stadium, but just as she reasons with him, the Crows kill Tim and Jacob reneges on the truce; forcing Batwoman to flee. At the Crows' headquarters, Jacob reaffirms his desire to take down Batwoman while Sophie learns about Safiyah from Julia. Kate shows Luke and Mary the Kryptonite in her possession, entrusted to her by Supergirl. (Note: As depicted in Crisis on Infinite Earths.) Alice finishes Elliot's new face, making him resemble Bruce Wayne.

== Cast and characters ==
=== Main ===
- Ruby Rose as Kate Kane / Batwoman
- Rachel Skarsten as Beth Kane / Alice
  - Skarsten also portrayed an alternate version of Beth who was displaced from her native Earth during "Crisis on Infinite Earths" and appeared on Earth-Prime.
- Meagan Tandy as Sophie Moore
- Nicole Kang as Mary Hamilton
- Camrus Johnson as Luke Fox
  - Johnson also portrays his Earth-99 counterpart.
- Elizabeth Anweis as Catherine Hamilton-Kane
- Dougray Scott as Jacob Kane

LaMonica Garrett also stars in "Crisis on Infinite Earths: Part Two" as Mar Novu / Monitor, a multiversal being who tests different Earths in the multiverse in preparation for an impending "crisis" orchestrated by his polar opposite, Mobius / Anti-Monitor.

=== Recurring ===
- Greyston Holt as Tyler
- Brendon Zub as Chuck Dodgson
- Rachel Maddow as the voice of Vesper Fairchild
- Gabriel Mann as Tommy Elliot / Hush
- Brianne Howey as Reagan
- Christina Wolfe as Julia Pennyworth
- Sam Littlefield as Jonathan Cartwright / Mouse
- Rachel Matthews as Margaret "Margot"/ Magpie
- John Emmet Tracy as August Cartwright
- Sebastian Roché as Ethan Campbell
- Michelle Morgan as Gabrielle Kane
- Cameron McDonald as Jack Forbes
- Malia Pyles as Parker Torres

=== Guest ===
- Gray Horse Rider as Kate's trainer
- Chris Shields as Michael Akins
- Giles Panton as Shane McKillen
- Jim Pirri as Bertrand Eldon / Executioner
- Mark Gibbon as Angus Stanton
- Matthew Graham as Dean Deveraux
- Kheon Clarke as Chris "The Fist" Medlock
- Phillip Mitchell as Stu Donnelly
- Brent Fidler as Judge Raymond Calverick
- Garfield Wilson as The Rifle
- Kurt Szarka as Slam Bradley
- Nathan Witte as Miguel Robles
- Seth Whittaker as Reggie Harris
- Ryan Rosery as Bryan Akins
- Gage Marsh as Steven Forbes
- Kayla Ewell as Natalia Knight / Nocturna
- Alessandra Torresani as Duela Dent
- Jeryl Prescott as Diane Moore
- Debra Mooney as Mabel Cartwright
- Alex Zahara as M. Butler
- Carmine Giovinazzo as Johnny Sabatino
- Warren Christie as Bruce Wayne

==== "Crisis on Infinite Earths" ====
- Stephen Amell as Oliver Queen / Green Arrow
- Caity Lotz as Sara Lance
- Brandon Routh as Ray Palmer and Clark Kent / Superman (Earth-96)
- Katherine McNamara as Mia Smoak
- Candice Patton as Iris West-Allen
- Dominic Purcell as Mick Rory (Earth-74)
- Tyler Hoechlin as Clark Kent / Superman (Earth-38) and Clark Kent / Superman (Earth-75)
- Elizabeth Tulloch as Lois Lane (Earth-38) and Lois Lane (Earth-75)
- Melissa Benoist as Kara Danvers / Supergirl
- Grant Gustin as Barry Allen
- Jon Cryer as Lex Luthor (Earth-38)
- Matt Ryan as John Constantine
- Tom Welling as Clark Kent (Earth-167)
- Audrey Marie Anderson as Lyla Michaels / Harbinger
- Kevin Conroy as Bruce Wayne (Earth-99)
- Johnathon Schaech as Jonah Hex (Earth-18)
- Erica Durance as Lois Lane (Earth 167)
- Wentworth Miller as the voice of Leonard A.I.

== Production ==
=== Development ===
In May 2018, The CW president Mark Pedowitz and Arrow lead Stephen Amell announced at The CW's upfront presentation that Batwoman would be introduced in the Arrowverse series' 2018 crossover, "Elseworlds", which aired in December 2018, fighting alongside the other Arrowverse heroes, with Gotham City also appearing. In July 2018, it was reported that the CW was planning to develop a series around the character, to air in 2019 if picked up. The series, said to only be a "script-development deal", was written by Caroline Dries, who would also serve as an executive producer with Greg Berlanti, Sarah Schecter, and the character's co-creator Geoff Johns. The series would be produced by Berlanti Productions and Mad Ghost Productions in association with Warner Bros. Television. The following month, Pedowitz noted the pilot would be completed "for mid-season".

In December 2018, Dries submitted a "strong" script for a potential pilot episode, according to Nellie Andreeva of Deadline Hollywood. That led to the series receiving a pilot order from the CW the next month, to be considered for a series order in the 2019–20 television season. As of April 2019, the series was considered "a lock" at The CW, and reportedly had a writing staff in place. On May 7, 2019, The CW ordered the show to series. On October 25, 2019, the series was picked up for a full season of 22 episodes.

=== Writing ===
The Batwoman origin story presented in the series is adapted from the Elegy comic book story arc. The events up to the fourth episode predate Batwoman's appearance in "Elseworlds", after which the events surpass the crossover.

=== Casting ===
Casting for Kate Kane was expected to begin after the announcement of the intended series in May 2018, with the intention of casting an out lesbian actress. In August, Ruby Rose was cast as Kate Kane / Batwoman. In late January 2019, Meagan Tandy, Camrus Johnson, and Nicole Kang were cast in the series regular roles as Sophie Moore, Luke Fox, and Mary Hamilton, respectively. This was followed shortly by the casting of Rachel Skarsten as Alice, Dougray Scott as Jacob Kane, and Elizabeth Anweis as Catherine Hamilton-Kane. According to Kang, Mary and Catherine were not specifically written as being non-white, but Dries and Greg Berlanti decided to "reveal or explore more types of people who live" in Gotham City, so both characters were written as Asian Americans, keeping with the fact that both Kang and Anweis are Korean Americans.

The casting of Rose as Batwoman was met by backlash on social media and received intense criticism. DC Comics, which owns the rights to the longtime comic book superheroine Batwoman, reintroduced the character in 2006 as a lesbian of Jewish descent. Some online reactions attacked Rose for not being Jewish, while the main focus of the criticism was the assertion that the fact she is gender fluid made her "not gay enough." Rose left Twitter and deactivated public commenting on her Instagram account following the backlash.

On August 21, 2019, Sam Littlefield was cast in a recurring role. In July, Burt Ward was cast for the Batwoman part in the 2019 Arrowverse crossover "Crisis on Infinite Earths". On October 4, 2019, Rachel Maddow and Sebastian Roché were cast in recurring capacities.

=== Filming ===
Production on the pilot episode began on March 4 and concluded on March 25, 2019, in Vancouver, British Columbia. Additional filming took place in Chicago, Illinois. David Nutter had been chosen to serve as director and executive producer on the pilot in January 2019, but by mid-February, left the project for personal reasons. Nutter remained an executive producer on the episode, with Marcos Siega replacing him as director and also serving as an executive producer. Filming for the rest of the season began on July 4 and was set to conclude in mid-2020. On March 12, 2020, Warner Bros. Television shut down production on the series due to the COVID-19 pandemic. The season had one additional day of shooting on episode 20, which could not happen because of the shut down. Dries said they were "lucky" despite this, because the last day of filming concluded the "important" Alice/Mouse storyline, resulting in "a really solid episode" with what had been filmed.

== Release ==
=== Broadcast ===
The season debuted on October 6, 2019, on The CW in the United States. It was originally set to run for 22 episodes, but as the 21st and 22nd episodes could not be filmed due to the COVID-19 pandemic, the 20th episode was announced as the finale.

=== Marketing ===
On May 16, 2019, The CW released the first official trailer for the series. The trailer received a negative reaction on YouTube, with viewers accusing it of an overemphasis on feminism. The trailer received 86,000 "likes" compared to 428,000 "dislikes" by August 22, 2019. Comic Book compared the backlash against a perceived agenda to that suffered by 2019's Captain Marvel and its actress Brie Larson. Alex Dalbey of The Daily Dot noted how the trailer received a range of angry reactions, but nonetheless felt that criticism of the trailer's focus on the protagonist being a woman was valid, which she found to be "forced" and "hamfisted" via the dialogue and choice of song. Dalbey also wrote: "It's 2019; we have Wonder Woman, Black Widow, Supergirl, Jessica Jones, Spider-Gwen, Captain Marvel and more. Batwoman isn't even the first lesbian superhero on the CW, there's also Thunder in Black Lightning." However, Jean Bentley of The Hollywood Reporter noted, "The character of Batwoman, aka Batman's cousin, Kate Kane, is the first lesbian superhero to headline her own series."

== Reception ==
=== Ratings ===
Viewership and ratings per episode of Batwoman season 1
No.	Title	Air date	Rating/share (18–49)	Viewers (millions)	DVR (18–49)	DVR viewers (millions)	Total (18–49)	Total viewers (millions)
1	"Pilot"	October 6, 2019	0.5/2	1.86	0.3	0.99	0.8	2.85
2	"The Rabbit Hole"	October 13, 2019	0.3/1	1.45	0.4	1.00	0.7	2.45
3	"Down Down Down"	October 20, 2019	0.3/1	1.22	0.3	0.90	0.6	2.12
4	"Who Are You?"	October 27, 2019	0.3/1	1.29	0.3	0.85	0.6	2.14
5	"Mine Is a Long and a Sad Tale"	November 3, 2019	0.3/1	1.16	0.2	0.71	0.5	1.87
6	"I'll Be Judge, I'll Be Jury"	November 10, 2019	0.3/1	1.09	0.2	0.78	0.5	1.87
7	"Tell Me the Truth"	November 17, 2019	0.3/1	1.01	0.2	0.62	0.5	1.63
8	"A Mad Tea-Party"	December 1, 2019	0.3/1	1.01	0.2	0.69	0.5	1.70
9	"Crisis on Infinite Earths: Part Two"	December 9, 2019	0.6/3	1.71	0.4	0.98	1.0	2.68
10	"How Queer Everything Is Today!"	January 19, 2020	0.2/1	0.79	0.2	0.65	0.4	1.44
11	"An Un-Birthday Present"	January 26, 2020	0.1/1	0.67	0.2	0.60	0.3	1.27
12	"Take Your Choice"	February 16, 2020	0.2	0.85	0.2	0.51	0.4	1.36
13	"Drink Me"	February 23, 2020	0.2	0.82	0.2	0.55	0.4	1.37
14	"Grinning From Ear to Ear"	March 8, 2020	0.2	0.75	0.2	0.47	0.4	1.22
15	"Off With Her Head"	March 15, 2020	0.2	0.75	0.2	0.49	0.4	1.24
16	"Through the Looking-Glass"	March 22, 2020	0.2	0.77	0.2	0.49	0.4	1.26
17	"A Narrow Escape"	April 26, 2020	0.2	0.63	0.2	0.56	0.4	1.19
18	"If You Believe in Me, I'll Believe in You"	May 3, 2020	0.2	0.64	0.2	0.48	0.4	1.12
19	"A Secret Kept From All the Rest"	May 10, 2020	0.2	0.70	0.2	0.53	0.4	1.23
20	"O, Mouse!"	May 17, 2020	0.2	0.74	0.1	0.43	0.3	1.17

=== Critical response ===
On review aggregator Rotten Tomatoes, the season holds an approval rating of 80% based on 235 reviews, with an average rating of 6.87/10. The site's critical consensus reads, "Though it needs more time to develop its own identity to truly soar, Batwoman's fun and stylish first season is a step in the right direction for representation and superhero shows alike." On Metacritic, the season has a weighted average score of 59 out of 100 based on reviews from 16 critics, indicating "mixed or average" reviews.
