= Atom (Ryan Choi) =

Fictional superhero in DC Comics

The Atom
- Ryan Choi as Atom as depicted in The All New Atom #4 (December 2006). Art by Eddy Barrows.

Publication information
- Publisher: DC Comics
- First appearance: DCU: Brave New World #1 (August 2006)
- Created by: Gail Simone; Grant Morrison

In-story information
- Alter ego: Ryan Choi
- Species: Human
- Team affiliations: Justice League; Teen Titans; Justice Foundation
- Notable aliases: Lun Lun
- Abilities: Size and mass alteration via belt; Genius-level intellect; Combat experience

Ryan Choi is a superhero appearing in American comic books published by DC Comics. Created by Gail Simone and Grant Morrison, the character first appeared in DCU: Brave New World #1 (August 2006) as the fourth superhero character to use the Atom name in the DC Universe. He emigrated to the United States following the death of his mother, to take up his idol Ray Palmer's former position at Ivy University, and went on to become a member of the Justice League.

In the DC Extended Universe film Justice League (2017), Ryan Choi was portrayed by Zheng Kai, but his scenes were cut from the theatrical version. His appearance was restored for the 2021 director's cut of the film, Zack Snyder's Justice League. Osric Chau portrayed Ryan Choi in the Arrowverse crossover "Crisis on Infinite Earths" and The Flash's eighth season.

== Publication history ==
Ryan Choi first appeared in DCU: Brave New World and was created by Gail Simone. Choi, as described by DC solicitations, is "a young hotshot professor who's filling the extra spot on Ivy University's teaching staff... and who inadvertently ends up filling the old Atom's super-heroic shoes".

In a Facebook post from 2017, Simone claimed that Ryan Choi was entirely her creation: "Grant Morrison did NOT create Ryan Choi. I envisioned him, developed him and named him. I was given some rough story ideas by Grant, I am sure they were brilliant, but I didn’t read them. My entire Atom pitch was lifted from a pitch I wrote for Impulse that did not get used".

Choi makes his first appearance in the new Rebirth continuity in the Justice League of America: The Atom one-shot, by Steve Orlando and Andrew MacDonald. His suit is redesigned to resemble Ray Palmer's appearance in the Arrowverse.

== Fictional character biography ==
Born in Hong Kong, Ryan Choi was a longtime protégé of Ray Palmer who had been corresponding with him through letters. After Palmer's disappearance, Ryan moved to Ivy Town in America to assume his mentor's place on the staff of Ivy University. Following clues left by Palmer, Ryan discovered a "bio-belt", allegedly the size and density-manipulating device used by his predecessor, and became the new Atom with Palmer's apparent blessing. Though taken with the superhero lifestyle, Ryan is a scientist first and foremost and approaches many of his adventures from the perspective of scientific discovery and investigation.

Since taking his mentor's place, Ryan has found himself at the center of a conflict between the forces of science and magic. It has been claimed that the impossible feats performed by Ray Palmer during his career caused the fabric of reality to warp in Ivy Town's vicinity, making it a nexus of paranormal activity. As the Atom, Ryan has faced numerous challenges, including the shrinking serial killer Dwarfstar, his strict and disapproving father, and being seduced, kidnapped, and swallowed alive by the size-changing villainess, Giganta.

Ryan is involved in the search for the missing Ray Palmer, traveling into the restored Multiverse along with Donna Troy, Jason Todd and a Monitor nicknamed "Bob". Literally plucked back to New Earth, he leaves his role of dimension-hopper to Kyle Rayner, returning to defend Ivy Town from a monster invasion. Later he is led to a mistaken belief that Ray Palmer has become an egocentric madman, and Ryan himself may be only a pawn of his mad fantasies. This is later revealed to be a ploy by Ray's old nemesis, Chronos. The All New Atom series ended with issue #25, when Ryan, with some help from the returned Ray Palmer, is able to discern between the truth and the lies fed by Chronos and his new assistant, Lady Chronos, a former sweetheart of Ryan turned to crime. Ryan eventually discovers that Ray Palmer never knew of Choi: instead the bio-belt was a tainted gift from Jia, and the Ray Palmer letters a clever forging by Chronos, meant to force Ryan into accepting the Atom mantle, and taking the blame for the staging menaces sent against the city. However, due to Ryan's ability into sorting out the mess, besting the Chronos couple and restoring Ivy to normalcy, Ray finally gives him his blessing.

Ryan expresses his desire to find a new identity for himself, since Ray, despite giving him his blessing earlier, had resumed using regularly his Atom identity. In Justice League: Cry for Justice #1, Ray and Ryan are seen fighting Killer Moth together, and at the end of the battle both of them show respect towards each other, with Ray asking Ryan to continue using the Atom name.

=== Brightest Day ===
During the Brightest Day event, Ryan is murdered by Deathstroke and his new team of Titans during their first mission. His corpse is then delivered in a matchbox to Dwarfstar, who is revealed to be the person who hired the Titans. His death caused some minor controversy, given both its timing and the supposed "lighter" new direction of DC Comics. A short time after Ryan's death, Deathstroke is briefly shown dismantling his bio-belt for an unknown purpose. In an interview done during Comic-Con International 2010, Titans writer Eric Wallace stated that Ryan's death would have major repercussions for the team, and would bring the Titans into conflict with the wider DCU.

Ray Palmer eventually finds Dwarfstar in a hospital, where he confesses to hiring Deathstroke to kill Ryan. Armed with this knowledge, Palmer leaves to inform the Justice League, but not before telling Dwarfstar that Deathstroke will likely kill him for his betrayal. Ray seriously injures Deathstroke for killing his friend, but the Titans ultimately escape due to the intervention of Isis and Osiris. It is revealed that Deathstroke dismantled Ryan's bio-belt, intending to use its technology to heal his son Jericho.

=== Convergence ===
In the Convergence crossover, when the alternate Brainiac miniaturized the universe of the New Earth, Ryan appears to be alive and confronts Ray Palmer, who was battling the Angor universe's Barracuda. Ryan reveals that after his death, his consciousness had survived in the universe where the Atoms' masses are shifted to whenever they change size. He later returns to the realm of the living after appropriating the flesh from Ray's severed hand to create a new body for himself. After Barracuda is defeated, the two Atoms work together to defeat Deathstroke, avenging Ryan's murder.

=== DC Rebirth ===
Ryan makes his official debut in the new DC Rebirth continuity as a teenage genius Ivy League college student tutored by Ray Palmer. Palmer reveals his identity as the Atom and enlists Ryan's help in fighting crime, talking to Ray from his lab in a tech support role. One day, after many adventures together, Ray goes missing. A week later, Ryan finds a message from Palmer along with one of his size-changing belts, asking the youth to come find him in the Microverse because he got stuck there when exploring a change in time and space. After receiving another scolding from Dean Plumm, Ryan heads back to the lab, using the bio-belt that Ray gave him to travel there through the Wi-Fi. When he arrives, he is met by Batman and Lobo who are there to recruit Ray Palmer into the new Justice League of America. Discovering that Ray is missing, Batman decides to leave until Lobo asks Ryan if he wrote down various equations to update the bio-belt on a blackboard. Impressed, Lobo decides that Batman should recruit Ryan, despite Batman not wanting to put him in danger. Lobo says it is Ryan's choice, and Ryan joins the JLA and sometime later, heads to Vanity, Oregon, to recruit the Ray into the team.

In the 2025 series Justice League: The Atom Project, Ray and Ryan work to reverse the aftermath of Absolute Power, in which many heroes had their powers stolen by the Amazo army. When the Amazos were destroyed, most of the heroes regained their powers, but some were unable to regain their powers, which were transferred to other heroes or civilians.

== Powers and abilities ==
Ryan Choi's abilities stand identical to that of his mentor and friend Ray Palmer, the original Atom. Having the capability to change size, mass, and weight at will through a dwarf star powered device known as the Quantum Bio-Belt, he can shrink down beyond the particle scale. This enables Ryan, in his own words, to miniaturize himself while retaining full physique at this level. Initially, he could only do so due to the belt his predecessor's enemy, Lady Chronos had made for him. Ryan also gains small microorganisms inside his body that give him innate size-changing abilities, albeit later in his development.

== Collected editions ==
Title	Material collected	Pages	ISBN
My Life in Miniature	The All-New Atom #1-6	160	ISBN 1-4012-1325-1
Future/Past	The All-New Atom #7-11	128	ISBN 1-4012-1568-8
The Hunt for Ray Palmer	The All-New Atom #12-16	128	ISBN 978-1-4012-1782-2
Small Wonder	The All-New Atom #17-18 and 20-25	192	ISBN 978-1-4012-1996-3

== In other media ==
=== Television ===
- Ryan Choi / Atom appears in Batman: The Brave and the Bold, voiced by James Sie.
- Ryan Choi appears in media set in the Arrowverse, portrayed by Osric Chau.
  - Choi first appears in the crossover event "Crisis on Infinite Earths", where he is recruited to combat the Anti-Monitor due to his status as the Paragon of Humanity.
  - An alternate timeline version of Choi appears as the Atom in the eighth season of The Flash.

=== Film ===
- An alternate universe version of Ryan Choi appears in Justice League: Gods and Monsters, voiced by Eric Bauza.
- Ryan Choi was intended to appear in Justice League, portrayed by Zheng Kai, before his scenes were cut. He is included in the director's cut, Zack Snyder's Justice League.
- Ryan Choi / Atom appears in Injustice, voiced by Yuri Lowenthal.
- Ryan Choi / Atom appears in Lego DC Comics Super Heroes: The Flash, voiced again by Eric Bauza.

=== Video games ===
- Ryan Choi / Atom appears in Scribblenauts Unmasked: A DC Comics Adventure.
- Ryan Choi / Atom appears as a downloadable playable character in Injustice 2, voiced by Matthew Yang King. He appears as part of the "Fighter Pack 3" DLC.
- Ryan Choi / Atom appears as a playable character in Lego DC Super-Villains, voiced by Jason Marsden.
