= List of Batwoman characters =

Batwoman is an American superhero television series developed by Caroline Dries based on the DC Comics character Batwoman, a costumed crime-fighter created by Geoff Johns, Grant Morrison, Greg Rucka, Mark Waid, and Keith Giffen. It is set in the Arrowverse, sharing continuity with the other television series of the universe.

The following is a list of characters who have appeared in the television series. Many are named after (or based on) DC Comics characters.

== Overview ==
Legend
= Main cast (credited)
= Recurring cast (4+)
= Guest cast (1-3)

Cast and characters in Batwoman
Character	Portrayed by	Seasons		
Character	Portrayed by	1	2	3
Lead characters
Kate Kane / Batwoman	Ruby Rose (Note: Gracyn Shinyei portrays a young Kate in the first season.)	Main		
Kate Kane / Batwoman	Wallis Day (Note: Day also portrays the original Circe Sionis in photographs.)		Recurring	
Ryan Wilder / Batwoman	Javicia Leslie		Main	Main
Main characters
Beth Kane / Alice	Rachel Skarsten (Note: Ava Sleeth portrays a young Beth in the second season.)	Main (Note: In season one, Skarsten also portrayed an alternate version of Beth who was displaced from her native Earth during "Crisis on Infinite Earths" and appeared on Earth-Prime.)	Main	Main
Sophie Moore	Meagan Tandy	Main	Main	Main
Mary Hamilton / Poison Mary	Nicole Kang	Main	Main	Main
Luke Fox / Batwing	Camrus Johnson	Main (Note: In season one, Johnson also portrays his Earth-99 counterpart during "Crisis on Infinite Earths".)	Main	Main
Catherine Hamilton-Kane	Elizabeth Anweis	Main (Note: Elizabeth Anweis is only credited in the episodes she appears.)		
Jacob Kane	Dougray Scott	Main (Note: Dougray Scott is credited as starring through "Rebirth".)	Main	
Mar Novu / Monitor	LaMonica Garrett	Main (Note: LaMonica Garrett only appears in "Crisis on Infinite Earths: Part Two".)		
Renee Montoya	Victoria Cartagena (Note: Cartagena reprises her role from the first season of Gotham.)			Main
Jada Jet	Robin Givens			Main
Marquis Jet	Nick Creegan			Main
Recurring characters
Tyler	Greyston Holt	Recurring		
Chuck Dodgson	Brendon Zub	Recurring		
Vesper Fairchild	Rachel Maddow	Recurring	Recurring	Guest
Tommy Elliot / Hush	Gabriel Mann	Recurring		
Tommy Elliot / Hush	Warren Christie	Guest	Guest	
Bruce Wayne / Batman	Warren Christie	Guest (Note: In season one, Kevin Conroy portrays an alternate version of Bruce from Earth-99 during "Crisis on Infinite Earths", while Warren Christie portrays the present-day Bruce in photographs, and uncredited body doubles portray Batman in flashbacks.)	Guest	
Reagan	Brianne Howey	Recurring		
Dana Dewitt	Allison Riley	Recurring	Recurring	Recurring
Julia Pennyworth	Christina Wolfe	Recurring	Recurring	
Jonathan Cartwright / Mouse	Sam Littlefield	Recurring	Guest	Guest
August Cartwright	John Emmet Tracy	Recurring	Guest	
Whelan	Sean Kuling	Recurring	Recurring	
Ethan Campbell	Sebastian Roché	Recurring		
Miguel Robles	Nathan Witte	Recurring		
Dr. M. Butler	Alex Zahara	Recurring		
Russell Tavaroff	Jesse Hutch	Guest	Recurring	
Susan Stevens	Rebecca Davis		Recurring	
Tatiana / The Whisper	Leah Gibson		Recurring	
Safiyah Sohail	Shivani Ghai		Recurring	
Angelique Martin	Bevin Bru		Recurring	
Ocean	Nathan Owens		Recurring	Guest
Roman Sionis / Black Mask	Peter Outerbridge		Recurring	
Evelyn Rhyme / Enigma	Laura Mennell		Recurring	
Lucius Fox A.I.	Donny Lucas (voice)		Guest	Recurring

== Lead characters ==
=== Kate Kane / Batwoman ===
Kate Kane (portrayed by Ruby Rose; main: season 1 and Wallis Day; recurring: season 2), Gracyn Shinyei as a child) is an out lesbian and the cousin of Bruce Wayne who, armed with a fierce passion for social justice and a flair for speaking her mind, dedicates herself to defending Gotham City in Batman's absence as Batwoman.

In season two, the airplane that Kate is coming in from National City crashes and she is presumed dead. It is then discovered that Kate is still alive. The False Face Society ambushed her on her plane, burning her face while trying to abduct her. Enigma makes Kate think she is Roman Sionis' daughter Circe while giving her a mask. Circe confronts Batwoman and Alice at a boat following Ocean and Angelique's escape and overpowers them, though Batwoman leaves Alice for Circe. She brings Alice to Black Mask who decides not to kill her. He then orders Circe to take Alice downstairs to be tortured. Alice manages to save herself only by offering to craft a new face for Circe.

After learning that she is Circe, Jacob and Alice use some items to cause Kate to remember some events prior to Tatiana and the False Face Society attacking her. Ryan Wilder finds her and brings her to Wayne Tower. Mary had to sedate her when Kate experiences a mental battle between her younger self and Circe. Upon pulling off a trick with Sophie, Kate as Circe confronts Black Mask, wanting to know why she has Kate's memories. Circe fools Luke, Sophie, and Mary by having them think that Kate is in control so that she can access the other parts of the Batcave. After a fight with Ryan, Circe makes off with the villain items and gives them to Black Mask before ripping apart the Batwoman suit. During a showdown at a bridge, Ryan and Alice use the vapors of the Snakebite on Circe, purging the Circe persona from her. After giving Ryan her blessing to continue as Batwoman, Kate leaves Gotham City.

=== Ryan Wilder / Batwoman ===
Ryan Wilder (portrayed by Javicia Leslie; seasons 2–3; Ava Augustin as a child) is Kate Kane's successor as Batwoman, who was nicknamed "Batwoman 2.0" by Vesper Fairchild. She is a highly skilled yet undisciplined fighter who spent 18 months in prison after two Crows operatives caught her with the drugs that Angelique Martin had in her possession. While her parole officer Susan Stevens expects her to maintain the conditions of her parole, Ryan was living out of her van with her plant and becomes the new Batwoman after finding the Batsuit in the wreckage of an airplane that Kate was coming in from National City. Ryan later had a final duel with Circe with Alice's help which led to Ryan using the vapors from the Snakebite to purge the Circe persona from Kate and even resuscitating her after Alice pulled Kate from the river. Thanks to Susan, Ryan is released from parole and receives Kate's blessing to continue as Batwoman.

In the third season, Ryan is blackmailed by former GCPD detective Renee Montoya to find the missing Batman villain items that fell into the river, while also learning that her birth mother is successful businesswoman Jada Jet, who initially rejects her in favor of her son, Marquis, though Marquis shows an interest in working with Ryan to bring the family closer. As Ryan recovers Batman's trophies, she later discovers that Marquis is suffering from psychopathic tendencies due to brain damage inflicted on him by the Joker as a child with his joy buzzer. Jada later confides to Ryan that Marquis killed his own father as a joke, which she covered up, and actually had Ryan given away to protect her from Marquis, only learning later that the midwife she had paid to cover it up actually abandoned Ryan beside a shop and kept the two million dollars meant to fund her education for himself. Ryan later finds out that the joy buzzer is the only thing that can restore Marquis's sanity, and that Montoya is actually holding it in her possession in exchange for Ryan freeing Poison Ivy from underneath Gotham, where Batman had previously buried her to stop her from exterminating Gotham's population. As Marquis takes over Wayne Enterprises, Ryan reluctantly helps free Ivy and acquires the joy buzzer, attracting the attention of Alice, who wants to use it to restore her own sanity as well. Ryan manages to defeat Ivy and strip her of her powers with help from Mary and Montoya when she decides to continue her plans to destroy Gotham, and the mayor orders both Montoya and Ivy to leave Gotham. As Marquis loses more of his sanity, he plans to unleash bombs of Joker's toxic gas all over Gotham, but he is foiled when Ryan defeats him and uses the joy buzzer on him with help from Alice, who decides to leave Gotham to seek rehabilitation elsewhere. Ryan later starts a relationship with Sophie Moore and mends her relationships with both Jada and Marquis, unaware that the chemicals released from the Joker gas canisters during the blimp crash have created a radioactive creature.

== Main characters ==
=== Beth Kane / Alice ===
Elizabeth "Beth" Kane / Alice (portrayed by Rachel Skarsten; seasons 1–3; Ava Sleeth as a child) is Kate's presumed-dead twin sister and the leader of the Wonderland Gang whose personality goes from maniacal to charming and back again as she sets out to erode Gotham's sense of security.

Beth Kane was presumed dead after a car accident, but her body was never recovered. In reality, she was rescued from drowning and held captive by August Cartwright who wants her to be a companion for his disfigured son Jonathan. After discovering her mother's decapacitated head in August's freezer Beth would later kill Mabel for taking her mother's earrings, snapping over the years of abuse, imprisonment, and mental torture, starting a house fire leading to her escape and August's disappearance shortly afterwards. At some point after escaping from August, Beth hid on a boat and was found by Safiyah Sohail, who trained her. Due to Beth falling for Ocean who wanted to make more use of the Desert Rose, Safiyah had their memories of each other suppressed by Enigma.

In season two, Alice and Ocean reunite and both experience suppressed memories of their time on Coryana. When Ocean gets abducted by the False Face Society, Alice works with Batwoman to rescue him and Angelique after torturing one of the members. Alice and Batwoman are attacked by a brainwashed Kate Kane, who believes she is Circe Sionis. Both of them are overpowered as Batwoman leaves Alice for her. Circe brings Alice to Black Mask who notes her history of leading the now-defunct Wonderland Gang and decides not to kill. In the series finale, Beth leaves Gotham to rediscover herself as Beth after gaining an sisterly relationship with Mary during Season 3.

- Skarsten also portrays an alternate version of Beth who was displaced from her native Earth during the events of "Crisis on Infinite Earths" and appeared on Earth-Prime. This version was saved by Kate and did not get lost during the car accident. She is later sniped by August Cartwright, mistaking her for Alice.

=== Sophie Moore ===
Sophie Moore (portrayed by Meagan Tandy; seasons 1–3) is a military academy graduate turned high-level Crows agent and Kate's estranged ex-girlfriend. When they were both threatened expulsion, Sophie decided to sign an agreement denying her sexuality, fearing rejection from everyone including her mother and led to her and Kate's break-up, since Kate wasn't afraid of judgment of being herself. In her earlier life with the Crows, Sophie was the one who apprehended Cluemaster thanks to an anonymous tip from Stephanie Brown. Throughout the first season, Sophie starts to be honest with herself, those closest to her and her sexuality and eventually figures out that Kate is Batwoman.

In season two, Sophie starts to work with the second Batwoman when it came to the False Face Society. She figures out that Ryan was Batwoman and notes this during the mission to find Cluemaster. After resigning due to Russell Tavaroff's insubordination, Sophie informs Jacob to review the evidence of him shooting Luke. After Jacob Kane shuts down Crows Security, Sophie commends him on this action. When Black Mask instigates a riot, Sophie stayed by a wounded Mayor Michael Akins until the paramedics arrived. Following the defeat of Black Mask and the removal of Circe from Kate's body, Sophie has one final moment with Kate before she leaves Gotham to visit her father, visit Supergirl, and search for Bruce.

=== Mary Hamilton / Poison Mary ===
Mary Hamilton (portrayed by Nicole Kang; seasons 1–3) is Kate's stepsister and a medical student/influencer-in-the-making loosely based on Bette Kane. She makes it her mission to provide aid to those living in Gotham's under-served communities.

In season two, Mary's clinic was shut down by Jacob following the incident with Amygdala. though Mary will not allow this to happen and finds a way to keep it open. Jacob allows the clinic to remain open after she treated his Snakebite drug and he helps to tend to those who have been given zombie personalities by the latest Snakebite drug. Upon the revelation that Black Mask had Enigma brainwash Kate into being Circe Sionis, Mary did use a sedative on her as she notes that Kate and Circe are fighting for control of Kate's body. Following Jacob's arrest, Mary gets a call from him stating that he is being transferred to a prison in Metropolis and to avoid getting targeted by the False Face Society. Her clinic comes in handy during the riots instigated by Black Mask and she figured out that the Snakebite found on Russell Tavaroff's body can be converted into a vapor to free Kate from the Circe persona.

In the third season, Mary gets ensnared by Poison Ivy's vine. She starts to place plants in her clinic with one of them helping in the thawing of Jordan Moore. It is then revealed that Mary was infected by the plant that caused her to be corrupted and become a new version of Poison Ivy referred to as Poison Mary when exposed to sunlight. Under this control, Mary was able to steal the Batwing component that contained the Lucius Fox A.I. to make use of it during the confrontation at the botanical gardens. After getting away, Mary drives off with Alice to another location, the pair becoming lovers. When Poison Mary infiltrated Marquis Jet's party, she revealed some secrets about Batwoman which led to him taking a disguised Luke captive. During a confrontation on the roof, Poison Mary escapes when Marquis was hit by the desiccation formula that was supposed to be used on Poison Mary. After mind-controlling Alice to sleep, Poison Mary makes her way to where Poison Ivy is. They then end up in an embrace that brings Poison Ivy back to full power. When at Gotham Dam, Poison Ivy drains Poison Mary completely when trying to destroy the dam, returning her to normal.

=== Luke Fox / Batwing ===
Lucas "Luke" Fox (portrayed by Camrus Johnson; seasons 1–3) is a staunch Dark Knight loyalist and the son of Lucius Fox who keeps Wayne Tower secure in Batman's absence but understands that Gotham needs a new hero.

In season two, Luke helps out Ryan Wilder when she becomes the current Batwoman following Kate's disappearance. When Luke was shot by Russell Tavaroff and Wolf Spider secretly administers the Desert Rose serum, Luke ends up in a purgatory state where he sees his father looking out the window as a subconscious form of Bruce Wayne advises him to either live or die. Regardless, Luke awakens from his coma. When Tavaroff made bail, Luke encountered him at a bar where he partook in a poker game that John Diggle was involved him. Afterwards, Tavaroff tried to attack him outside the bar only for Diggle to fight him off. Then Luke and Diggle compared how they lost their fathers as Diggle advises him to take the right path as the Bat-Signal gives off a Morse code. Luke later takes on the Batwing mantle where he saves Mary from a powered Russell Tavaroff.

In the third season, Luke works to improve the Batwing costume where he meets the A.I. version of his father within it. When Mary becomes Poison Mary, she steals the Lucius Fox A.I. from the Batwing suit and gives it to Marquis. Luke managed to reclaim the A.I. when he and Sophie infiltrate Wayne Enterprises. When it comes to stopping a Batblimp that is going to detonate enough to dump Joker acid on Gotham City, Batwing manages to divert it to a desolate part of Gotham City at the sacrifice of the Lucius Fox A.I.

- Camrus Johnson also portrays his Earth-99 counterpart during "Crisis on Infinite Earths".

=== Jacob Kane ===
Jacob Kane (portrayed by Dougray Scott; seasons 1–2) is Kate and Beth's father, Bruce Wayne's uncle, and a former military colonel with a chip on his shoulder who commands a private security agency, the Crows, in an attempt to protect Gotham better than Batman could.

Jacob is later arrested by those police officers for withholding information about Alice being Beth Kane. While being taken into GCPD HQ, Jacob stated that Beth became Alice due to the bad people twisting her childhood and for all parents to think about their children. Jacob informs Mary that he is being transferred to a prison in Metropolis and advises her to stay off the False Face Society's radar. After Black Mask is defeated, Kate plans to visit her father before going to visit Supergirl and search for Bruce.

=== Catherine Hamilton-Kane ===
Catherine Hamilton-Kane (portrayed by Elizabeth Anweis; season 1) is Mary's mother, a defense contractor, and the CEO of Hamilton Dynamics. After marrying Jacob Kane, Catherine faked Beth's death by bribing DNA analysts in an attempt to help him and Kate move on, leading to everyone giving up the search and leaving Beth at the mercy of August. After realizing that Beth may be Alice, Catherine desperately tried to hide the truth by making several attempts on Alice's life. As revenge for the pain Catherine caused her, Alice manipulated events that caused her to reveal to her deception of Beth's death to Jacob. Catherine and Mary are both poisoned, with Catherine sacrificing herself to allow Mary to live.

=== Mar Novu / Monitor ===
Mar Novu / Monitor (portrayed by LaMonica Garrett; season 1) is a multiversal being who tests different Earths in the multiverse in preparation for an impending "crisis" orchestrated by Mobius / Anti-Monitor, his polar opposite who is dedicated to ending the multiverse. Garrett is credited only for "Crisis on Infinite Earths: Part Two".

=== Renee Montoya ===
Renee Montoya (portrayed by Victoria Cartagena; season 3) is a former member of the Gotham City Police Department who left due to the corruption in some of its members. Cartagena reprises her role from the first season of Gotham.

=== Jada Jet ===
Jada Jet (portrayed by Robin Givens; season 3) is the CEO of Jeturian Industries which specializes in microtechnology, Marquis Jet's mother, and Ryan Wilder's birth mother. She took over control over the death of her husband a decade ago because of one of Marquis' sociopathic behavior and doubled the company's wealth over time.

=== Marquis Jet ===
Marquis Jet (portrayed by Nick Creegan as an adult; season 3; Kendrick Jackson as a 7-year-old, Christian Darrel Scott as a 13-year-old and 16-year-old) is the playboy son of Jada Jet and Franklin, the half-brother of Ryan, and the executive vice-president of Jeturian Industries. As a child, he was attacked by the original Joker who hijacked his school bus and zapped his head with his joy buzzer, causing serious brain damage. Ever since then, Marquis has exhibited anger issues and sociopathic behavior. Marquis has his mind restored after being exposed to the joy buzzer a second time.

== Recurring characters ==
This is a list of recurring actors and the characters they portrayed in multiple episodes, which were significant roles. The characters are listed by the order in which they first appeared.

=== Introduced in season one ===
==== Tyler ====
Tyler (portrayed by Greyston Holt) is a Crows agent and Sophie's ex-husband.

==== Dodgson ====
Dodgson (portrayed by Brendon Zub) is a former Crows agent who serves as Alice's second-in-command of the Wonderland Gang and lover.

==== Vesper Fairchild ====
Vesper Fairchild (voiced by Rachel Maddow) is a snarky gossip maven and media personality.

==== Tommy Elliot / Hush / "Bruce Wayne" ====
Thomas "Tommy" Elliot (portrayed by Gabriel Mann as Tommy and Hush, Warren Christie when posing as Bruce Wayne) is a real estate mogul and former childhood friend of Bruce Wayne, who later becomes the villain Hush.

==== Reagan ====
Reagan (portrayed by Brianne Howey) is a bartender and one of Kate's love interests, as well as Magpie's sister and former accomplice.

==== Dana Dewitt ====
Dana Dewitt (portrayed by Allison Riley) is an anchorwoman for Gotham City News.

==== Julia Pennyworth ====
Julia Pennyworth (portrayed by Christina Wolfe) is a British spy, daughter of Alfred Pennyworth, and Kate's ex-lover. She pursued the Rifle and discovered that he works for Safiyah Sohail.

==== Jonathan Cartwright / Mouse ====
Jonathan Cartwright / Mouse (portrayed by Sam Littlefield as an adult, Nicholas Holmes as a child) is the disfigured son of August Cartwright and Alice's right hand member of the Wonderland Gang with a talent for voice mimicry and impersonation who considers himself Alice's brother figure and best friend. He lets his father keep Beth captive so he could have a friend who won't shun him for his deformity, letting Alice get abused resulting in her becoming Alice. When Mouse starts to see that Alice is becoming too obsessed with wanting to kill Batwoman following the translation of Lucius Fox's coded journal, Alice kills Mouse by poisoning his tea.

==== August Cartwright ====
August Cartwright (portrayed by John Emmet Tracy) is Mouse's father who fished Beth out of the river following the accident and imprisoned her to be Jonathan's "friend" and for his own nefarious purposes. In the present, August has been posing as Doctor Ethan Campbell (portrayed by Sebastian Roché) who is a well-known plastic surgeon and philanthropist. Using the face of Duela Dent, Alice captures August and leaves him for Kate and Jacob to be their prisoner. Kate kills August in anger for what he did to Beth and their mother's corpse.

==== Whelan ====
Whelan (portrayed by Sean Kuling) is a former agent of Crows Security.

==== Miguel Robles ====
Miguel Robles (portrayed by Nathan Witte) is a Crows agent working for Tommy Elliot who was tasked with getting Lucius Fox's journals, only to accidentally get him killed and frame someone else for it. Years later, he took up the Detonator identity to cover his tracks, only to be thwarted by Batwoman and Luke.

==== M. Butler ====
M. Butler (portrayed by Alex Zahara) is a therapist at Arkham Asylum. Mouse later killed and impersonated him.

=== Introduced in season two ===
==== Susan Stevens ====
Susan Stevens (portrayed by Rebecca Davis) is a parole officer assigned to Ryan Wilder. After Black Mask enlisted the police officers on his side to set up Ryan for possession of Snakebite, Susan confronts Ryan who claims that she is Batwoman and Black Mask wants her dead. Susan gets her proof when the police officers on Black Mask's side try to do away with her and Ryan defeats them. Susan then gives Ryan her visitor badge so that she can sneak out of the courthouse. Following Black Mask's defeat, Susan is present when the parole board releases Ryan from her parole.

==== Tatiana / The Whisper ====
Tatiana / The Whisper (portrayed by Leah Gibson) is a skilled assassin and henchwoman working for Safiyah Sohail whom she has a crush on and is loosely based on Tahani. Alice later fought Tatiana outside her hideout and managed to kill her prior to finding Ocean dead.

==== Safiyah Sohail ====
Safiyah Sohail (portrayed by Shivani Ghai) is the ruler of a small community on the island of Coryana who is the Rifle's boss and the boss of the Many Arms of Death. She also has a history with Alice and they both share a mutual hatred of Catherine Hamilton-Kane as well as a connection with Black Mask. Alice stabs and kills Safiyah, then crushes her body to prevent her from being revived.

==== Angelique Martin ====
Angelique Martin (portrayed by Bevin Bru as an adult, Kerensa Cooper as a child) is a former foster acquaintance of Ryan Wilder. Growing up, they fell in love until it got strained with Angelique taking up a life of crime. At one point, she ran into Sophie and Alice at the time when they were looking for Ocean. Following the arrest of Candice Long, Ryan called Angelique to notify her and call a truce. After Angelique finds out that Sophie Moore had manipulated Ryan into bugging her phone, their relationship is strained again. As Batwoman, Ryan gets the information from Angelique on where Ocean can be found. Angelique wore a baby doll mask when two False Face Society members killed Commissioner Forbes. Ryan found out through Jordan Moore's description and had to persuade Angelique to leave that life. Though Black Mask would not take this departure lightly and had her tied up on a sawmill. Ryan rescues Angelique with Sophie's help. She takes the blame for Commissioner Forbes' murder to protect Ryan from attacks by the False-Face Society. It was also revealed that Angelique helped Ocean to make the Snakebite drug. While in Edgewater Correctional, Ryan persuades her to leak the names of the culprits that shot Forbes. While having Sophie arrange for Angelique to be placed in witness protection, Ryan gets a call for her which is interrupted when the transport gets intercepted by members of the False Face Society who kill the Crows Agents present and make off with Angelique. With Angelique in his possession, Black Mask orders his men to gather ingredients for Snakebite while also using a corrosive agent to threaten Angelique. Following Black Mask's fight with Batwoman and Sophie Moore, Angelique states to Black Mask that she can help find Ocean to complete the Snakebite recipe. Batwoman and Alice succeed in rescuing Angelique and Ocean. Afterwards, Angelique successfully enters the witness protection program.

==== Ocean ====
Ocean (portrayed by Nathan Owens) is a zen gardener and thinker who is a brother-figure to Safiyah Sohail. He once intended to make use of the Desert Rose and Beth Kane fell for him. Safiyah found out through Tatiana and had them punished by having Enigma suppress their memories of each other. When Alice and Ocean reunite, suppressed memories start to surface of their time on Coryana. After recovering from a shooting, Ocean was present when Alice talked to Enigma about undoing the brainwashing she did to Kate. When Enigma stated that it required a password to fully undo the brainwashing alongside an item that belonged to Kate, Ocean snapped Enigma's neck much to the dismay of Alice as he stated that Kate will only put her back in Arkham Asylum if it worked. He later disposes of Enigma's body. After helping to procure items for Alice and Jacob Kane to restore Kate's memories, Alice later found Ocean dead in her hideout after killing Tatiana.

==== Roman Sionis / Black Mask ====
Roman Sionis (portrayed by Peter Outerbridge) is the CEO of Janus Cosmetics who wears a wooden black-colored mask when operating as the crime lord Black Mask. In this alias, he leads the False Face Society.

==== Evelyn Rhyme / Enigma ====
Enigma (portrayed by Laura Mennell) is a hypnotist who is a mutual ally of Safiyah Sohail and Black Mask and poses as a therapist named Dr. Evelyn Rhyme. Ocean later kills Enigma, disposes of her body, and suggests to Alice that Enigma was the daughter of the Riddler; due to her having a cane that is similar to his.

==== Russell Tavaroff ====
Russell Tavaroff (portrayed by Jesse Hutch) is a Crows agent who Jacob Kane assigned to take over Sophie Moore's case.

=== Introduced in season three ===
==== Lucius Fox A.I. ====
The Lucius Fox A.I. (voiced by Donny Lucas) is an artificial intelligence based on Lucius Fox that Luke finds in the Batwing helmet.

== Guest stars ==
The following is a supplementary list of guest stars, some recurring, who appear in lesser roles. The characters are listed in the order in which they first appeared.

=== Introduced in season one ===
- Kate's trainer (portrayed by Gray Horse Rider) - An unnamed Indian man who trained Kate in the arctic.
- Michael Akins (portrayed by Chris Shields) - The mayor of Gotham City.
- Gabrielle "Gabi" Kane (portrayed by Michelle Morgan) - The wife of Jacob Kane and mother of Kate and Beth who perished in a car accident that Batman tried to prevent.
- Margot / Magpie (portrayed by Rachel Matthews) - Reagan's sister who operates as a jewel thief named Magpie.
- Shane McKillen (portrayed by Giles Panton) - A man who works for Catherine. After losing a pinkie to Alice after a failed mission with his fellow men, he carries Alice's message to Catherine and leaves her stating that she is on her own.
- Bertrand Eldon / Executioner (portrayed by Jim Pirri) - A former executioner at Blackgate Penitentiary who starts going after the same group of people he blames for sending innocents to death row. He is killed by Jacob which set off a gas-based fail-safe that nearly killed Batwoman and Jacob.
- Angus Stanton (portrayed by Mark Gibbon) - The assistant district attorney who is one of the Executioner's victims.
- Dean Deveraux (portrayed by Matthew Graham) - A worker at Hamilton Dynamics that Mouse impersonates. He is later killed by Mouse when he gets frustrated at Alice for keeping Batwoman's identity secret.
- Chris "The Fist" Medlock (portrayed by Kheon Clarke) - A boxer and ex-con previously prosecuted by Stanton who was suspected of being Executioner.
- Stu Donnelly (portrayed by Phillip Mitchell) - A GCPD detective who is one of the Executioner's victims.
- Judge Raymond Calverick (portrayed by Brent Fidler) - A corrupt hanging judge who worked with Angus and Stu to send innocent men to Blackgate Penitentiary's death row.
- Dean Devereaux (portrayed by Matthew Graham) - The head of Hamilton Dynamic's project that involved building the Coil Accelerator. Alice had him kidnapped so that Mouse can impersonate him. After finding out about the Coil Accelerator, Mouse confronted Alice about it while shooting Dean.
- The Rifle (portrayed by Garfield Wilson) - A professional assassin who works for Safiyah Sohail.
- Jack Forbes (portrayed by Cameron McDonald) - The police commissioner of the GCPD. In season two, Forbes speaks out about the distribution of the Snakebite drug and is assassinated by the False Face Society. This was witnessed by Jordan Moore.
- Oliver Queen / Green Arrow (portrayed by Stephen Amell) - An archery-based superhero who protects Star City.
- Nash Wells / Pariah (portrayed by Tom Cavanagh) - An alternate version of Harrison Wells who was tricked into freeing the Anti-Monitor.
- Bruce Wayne of Earth-99 (portrayed by Kevin Conroy) - An older parallel universe counterpart of Bruce Wayne from the future of Earth-99, who's confined to an exo-skeleton after killing his world's Superman. He lost all hope sometime during his career and started killing his enemies, which was made worse when his Kate died trying to show him the error of his ways. Bruce was accidentally electrocuted during a scuffle with Kate of Earth-1 and Kara.
- Clark Kent of Earth-167 (portrayed by Tom Welling) - A version of Clark Kent from Earth-167 who gave up his powers to spend time with Lois and his family. When Lex Luthor of Earth-38 came to kill him, the former chose not to once he learned what happened; feeling it wasn't worth it.
- Lois Lane of Earth 167 (portrayed by Erica Durance) - The wife of Earth-167's Clark Kent.
- Clark Kent / Superman (portrayed by Tyler Hoechlin) - A Kryptonian superhero who defends Metropolis on Earth-38.
- Lois Lane (portrayed by Elizabeth Tulloch) - The wife of Earth-38 Clark Kent.
- Iris West-Allen (portrayed by Candice Patton) - The wife of the Flash.
- Clark Kent / Superman of Earth-96 (portrayed by Brandon Routh) - A version of Clark Kent from Earth-96 who became the editor-in-chief of the Daily Planet after losing his Lois and fellow staff members in a gas attack caused by an unsatisfied Gotham City inhabitant.
- Ray Palmer / Atom (portrayed by Brandon Routh) - A Legends member, scientist, and inventor capable of shrinking and growing to immense sizes whilst wearing a special suit.
- Kara Danvers / Supergirl (portrayed by Melissa Benoist) - A Kryptonian operating on Earth-38 and the cousin of Superman.
- Barry Allen / Flash (portrayed by Grant Gustin) - A speedster who protects Central City.
- Lex Luthor (portrayed by Jon Cryer) - The archenemy of his Earth's Superman and Supergirl.
- Sara Lance / White Canary (portrayed by Caity Lotz) - The leader of the Legends.
- Mick Rory / Heat Wave of Earth-74 (portrayed by Dominic Purcell) - An alternate version of Legends member Heat Wave from Earth-74 who lent his Waverider to the assembled heroes.
- "Leonard" (voiced by Wentworth Miller) - The A.I. of Earth-74's Waverider who is modeled after Captain Cold.
- Mia Smoak (portrayed by Katherine McNamara) - The daughter of Green Arrow who was brought from the year 2040 by the Monitor.
- Lyla Michaels / Harbinger (portrayed by Audrey Marie Anderson) - An A.R.G.U.S. agent who was granted multiversal powers by the Monitor so she could help avert Crisis.
- John Constantine (portrayed by Matt Ryan) - An enigmatic and irreverent former con man turned reluctant supernatural detective and Legends member.
- Jonah Hex of Earth-18 (portrayed by Johnathon Schaech) - A version of Jonah Hex who hoarded a Lazarus Pit.
- Parker Torres (portrayed by Malia Pyles) - A lesbian student at Gotham Prep and adept hacker. After an ex-girlfriend of hers outed her, she staged a train brake failure while she was a passenger to garner sympathy from her homophobic parents. Later, she anonymously extorted all of Gotham under the threat of doxxing in order to gain money to leave the city and start a new life. After her life was threatened by Alice, Parker secretly sent a text to everyone that Alice and a bomb were at Gotham Prep under the cover that she'd leak Batwoman's identity. With the lives saved and Alice in Crows custody, Kate made Parker a deal to do community service and return any extortion money instead of going to juvenile detention, while supporting her out lifestyle. After being saved from an attempted abduction from Hush, Parker helps Batwoman in finding Luke and Julia when they get captured by Hush.
- Slam Bradley (portrayed by Kurt Szarka) - A member of the Gotham City Police Department. After he saved Batwoman from being hit by a loose grappling hook, the media and many Gotham citizens began "shipping" them, to Kate's chagrin.
- Reggie Harris (portrayed by Seth Whittaker) - An inmate at Blackgate Penitentiary that Jacob encounters. He was incarcerated when he was framed for the murder of Lucius Fox by Miguel Robles. After being released for a re-trial, Reggie is confronted by Luke where Reggis is sniped by Michael Fisher on Miguel's orders.
- Bryan Akins (portrayed by Ryan Rosery) - The son of Mayor Michael Akins.
- Steven Forbes (portrayed by Gage Marsh) - The son of Commissioner Jack Forbes.
- Natalia Knight / Nocturna (portrayed by Kayla Ewell) - A woman with porphyria who adopts a vampire persona and targets people for their blood while using ketamine in fanged dental implants to stun them.
- Duela Dent (portrayed by Alessandra Torresani) - The niece of Harvey Dent who slashed her own face when she was young and proceeded to target social media influencers. After she is apprehended, Alice steals her face so she can use it to get revenge on August.
- Sophie's mother: (portrayed by Jeryl Prescott) - She likes Batman and dislikes Batwoman.
- Mabel Cartwright (portrayed by Debra Mooney) - The mother of August and the grandmother of Mouse who Alice referred to as the Queen of Hearts. She was the first person Alice ever killed.
- Michael Fisher (portrayed by Sean Kohnke) - An assassin working for Miguel Robles who was responsible for killing Alia Nazari and Reggie Harris. He tried to take out Jacob Kane and was killed by him.
- Johnny Sabatino (portrayed by Carmine Giovinazzo) - A gangster with connections to Tommy Elliot.
- Professor John Carr (portrayed by Linden Banks) - A numerical analyst with a pacemaker in his heart who was among the linguists that were abducted by Hush as part of Alice's plot to get Lucius Fox's coded journal translated. Alice subjects him to lethal shock therapy when he fails to translate it in time.
- Tony Kim (portrayed by Tom Lim) - A NSA analyst who was among the linguists that were abducted by Hush as part of Alice's plot to get Lucius Fox's coded journal translated. Alice subjects him to lethal shock therapy when he failes to translate it in time.
- Tim "Titan" Teslow (portrayed by Terrence Terrell) - A former football player who went rogue upon taking steroids and was remanded to Arkham Asylum after killing a referee who called out Tim's penalty. Thanks to Alice's prison break, Tim was among the Arkham Asylum inmates that escaped. Upon his escape, he wielded two machetes and started to tie up some loose ends by beheading the lead medical examiner who covered up his medical condition and stabbed his brother Apollo for testifying against him despite Batwoman's attempt to intervene. Mary had to talk Jacob into holding a truce with Batwoman to defeat Tim. When it came to Tim's latest target Coach Kurt Donahue, Batwoman fought and managed to get through to him. Though Jacob went back on the truce and had his Crows agents gun him down.
- Bruce Wayne / Batman (portrayed by Warren Christie) - The cousin of Kate who went missing three years ago. Thanks to Alice, Tommy Elliot started to impersonate him. In season two, Luke was shot by Russell Tavaroff and encounters a subconscious version of Bruce who gives him the choice of either living or dying.

=== Introduced in season two ===
- Cora Lewis (portrayed by Shakura S'Aida) - The adoptive mother of Ryan Wilder who alongside her landlord was killed by squatters that were associated with Alice. This incident earned Alice the ire of Ryan. Cora later appears in Ryan's hallucinations during her fight with Alice advising her not to avenge her.
- False Face Society - A gang of masked people who work for Black Mask. They are instructed to distribute the Snakebite drug, dispose of anyone that is a threat to them, and dispose of any witnesses in the act.
  - Clown (portrayed by Jason Day) - A clown mask-wearing member of the False Face Society.
  - Ski Mask (portrayed by Marcus Aurelio) - A ski mask-wearing member of the False Face Society.
  - Devil (portrayed by Alex Stines) - A devil mask-wearing member of the False Face Society.
  - Rudy / Panda (portrayed by Aason Nadjiwon) - A member of the False Face Society who wears a panda-themed mask.
  - Hockey Mask (portrayed by Tommy Europe) - A hockey mask-wearing member of the False Face Society.
  - Gas Mask (portrayed by Matt Reimer) - A gas mask-wearing member of the False Face Society.
  - Plague Doctor (portrayed by Chad Bellamy) - A plague doctor mask-wearing member of the False Face Society. Black Mask kills him and has his body hung in front of a bound Angelique Martin to serve as a warning to anyone who plans to desert the False Face Society.
  - Guy Fawkes (portrayed by Nathaniel Shuker) - A Guy Fawkes mask-wearing member of the False Face Society. When Batwoman got captured trying to rescue Angelique at the sawmill, Black Mask had this operative executed with a circular saw for failing him.
  - Chrome Mask (portrayed by Rochelle Okoye) - A chrome mask-wearing member of the False Face Society.
  - X'ed-Out Eyes (portrayed by Sonya Proehl) - A member of the False Face Society who wears a mask that has the eyes x'ed out.
  - Porcelain Mask (portrayed by Sean Owen Roberts) - A porcelain mask-wearing member of the False Face Society.
  - Patchwork (portrayed by Christian Sloan) - A patchwork mask-wearing member of the False Face Society.
  - Teardrop (portrayed by Cooper Bibaud) - A member of the False Face Society.
  - Ogre Mask (portrayed by Tyson Arner) - A member of the False Face Society who wears an ogre mask.
- Victor Zsasz (portrayed by Alex Morf) - A hitman with high, unpredictable energy who proudly carves tally marks onto his skin for every victim he kills.
- Candice "Candy Lady" Long (portrayed by Linda Kash) - A woman who lures children to her van and takes them captive where she holds them in her attic. Using a jar that she slowly removes jelly beans from, she counts down the days for someone to look for the child. Anyone that doesn't show up has Candice performing a child trafficking activity where she gives them to the False Face Society. This nearly happened to a younger Ryan until Angelique rescued her. Years later, Candice is still up to her activities. Running into Ryan again when she was looking for Kevin Johnson, Ryan learned her connection with the False Face Society and beat her to submission. Vesper Fairchild later mentioned that Candice was arrested and revealed her connections to the False Face Society.
- Kevin Johnson (portrayed by Eli Tsepsio Lamour) - A young boy in foster care who gets abducted by Candice and sold to the False Face Society. His initiation was to shoot a captive Jacob Kane. With Batwoman's help after she took down the False Face Society members present, Jacob was able to talk Kevin down.
- Garrett Hang (portrayed by Donny Lucas) - A man that Jacob Kane was meeting about the sale of the portrait that Jack Napier made. During the discussion, he was killed by Pike.
- Many Arms of Death - An assassin organization operating in Coryana that is loyal to Safiyah Sohail.
  - Pike (portrayed by Scott Pocha) - A pike-wielding assassin and member of the Many Arms of Death. After killing Garrett Hang during his meeting with Jacob Kane, Pike was taken prisoner by Batwoman. Due to a deal, Batwoman allowed Jacob Kane and Sophie Moore to see Pike. Before committing suicide by cyanide capsure, Pike revealed that the portrait contained the map to Coryana.
  - Rapier (portrayed by Alex Stines) - A rapier-wielding member of the Many Arms of Death who accompanied some unnamed members in attacking Ocean at the motel he was at. He was killed by Alice.
  - Dire-Flail (portrayed by Janene Carleton) - A flail-wielding member of the Many Arms of Death who was dispatched by Safiyah to target Luke and Mary. Both of them held their own against Dire-Flail before she was killed by Julia Pennyworth.
- Evan Blake / Wolf Spider (portrayed by Lincoln Clauss) - An old friend of Kate Kane who operates as an art thief.
- Dr. Ethan Rogers (portrayed by Milo Shandel) - A doctor at Hamilton Dynamic's branch Garnick Industries who is seeking to replicate the Desert Rose cure. He does that by releasing Aaron Helzinger to get to the source of it. After Batwoman defeats Helzinger, a masked Dr. Rogers shows up with his men and coerces Batwoman into giving her the map by threatening to shoot Sophie Moore. Batwoman had no choice but to comply. When the Crows trace Dr. Rogers to Garnick Industries, Jacob and Sophie find Dr. Rogers and those with him dead as they were massacred by the Many Arms of Death.
- Aaron Helzinger / Amygdala (portrayed by R. J. Fetherstonhaugh) - A mentally-unstable patient of Hamilton Dynamics.
- Jordan Moore (portrayed by Keeya King) - An activist against bad law enforcement and the younger sister of Sophie who was a witness to Commissioner Forbes' murder. In the third season, Jordan was captured by Black Glove and used in their cryogenic experiments. Her life was saved by Batwoman and Mary.
- Horten Spence (portrayed by Jaime M. Callica) - A reporter from the Gotham Gazette who lost his job and attended the opening of a community center that Ryan was going to help out in. He found information on the related community center attacks when visited by Batwoman and was attacked by Kilovolt. Mary was able to heal him. After the Kilovolt plots were thwarted, Horten regained his job with the article that exposed it. Vesper Fairchild called him Batwoman's version of Lois Lane.
- Imani (portrayed by Samantha Liana Cole) - The Director of Tutoring at Sheldon Park Community Center.
- Ellis O'Brien (portrayed by Derek Morrison) - The CEO of Edgewater Correctional who was behind the Kilovolt plots on community centers as he believed those places would prevent the rise in criminals. Using special electrical guns, Ellis had different prisoners briefly released to attack locations. Batwoman confronted Ellis and was attacked by him and his minions. They were all defeated by Luke who used the electrical gun he got off of one of Ellis' pawns. Vesper Fairchild reported that Ellis and those involved are now part of the prison population.
- Michael Kastrinos (portrayed by Sean Kohnke) - An inmate at Edgewater Correctional who was used by Ellis O'Brien in his Kilovolt plot. In his masked appearance, he wielded an electrical gun when attacking a community center that Ryan was going to help out in. Then he tried to do away with Horten Spence. Luke was able to learn of Michael's identity and later found that security footage of him in his prison cell was looped to cover up his use in Ellis' illegal activities.
- Arthur Brown / Cluemaster (portrayed by Rick Miller) - A villain, fired game show host, and father of Stephanie Brown who leaves clues at his crimes. In her earlier days, Sophie Moore apprehended Cluemaster thanks to an anonymous tip from Stephanie which led to him getting incarcerated at Blackgate Penitentiary.
- Stephanie Brown (portrayed by Morgan Kohan) - The daughter of Cluemaster who disapproves of her father's activities.
- Eli (portrayed by Kaiden Berge) - A petty criminal that Ryan, Luke, and Sophie encounter in their cell. When trying to commit a carjacking, Luke tried to stop him only for Eli to lie to Russell Tavaroff that he was committing the crime where Luke was shot when he was trying to prove it on his phone. Batwoman later confronted him after he stole a car and he stated that Tavaroff shot Luke. Batwoman left Eli for the police.
- Lucius Fox (portrayed by Domonique Adam) - The father of Luke Fox who wrote the journals in codes about how to defeat the Batsuit. He was killed by Miguel Robles who sought the journals. When Luke was shot by Russell Tavaroff and ended up in a purgatory state, Lucius was partially seen by the window in a pondering state as a subconscious manifestation of Bruce Wayne gave Luke the choice of living or dying. Later, among Lucius' things, Luke finds the Batwing suit that his father designed for him as well as an A.I. copy of him.
- John Diggle (portrayed by David Ramsay) - An A.R.G.U.S. agent from Star City who is on assignment in Gotham City. Luke Fox encountered him in a bar where he got involved in a poker game with Russell Tavaroff. When Russell attacked Luke outside the bar, Diggle fended him off. While comparing to how they both lost their fathers, Diggle advised Luke to take the right path as they notice the Bat-Signal giving off a morse code. In the third season, Diggle assists his old friend Jada Jet into finding Joker's joy buzzer that would be used to help treat Marquis.

=== Introduced in season three ===
- Liam Crandle / Mad Hatter (portrayed by Amitai Marmorstein) - An obsessed fan of Alice who becomes the second Mad Hatter after purchasing the hat from two boys who found it on the shores of the river. Mad Hatter hijacks Mary Hamilton's medical school graduation to protest Alice's fate and the inequity of Gotham's healthcare system. When Alice finally meets him, Mad Hatter was persuaded to release everyone from the hat's mind-control before being non-fatally stabbed by her.
- Mayor Hartley (portrayed by Sharon Taylor) - The mayor of Gotham City who succeeds Michael Akins.
- Steven / Killer Croc 2.0 (performed by Heidi Ben) - A teenager who was mutated into a crocodilian form after inadvertently cutting himself with Killer Croc's tooth.
- Mason (portrayed by Alistair Abell) - The father of Steven who is looking for him ever since his mutation into the second Killer Croc. As he didn't want Batwoman or Alice to harm and lock up his son, Mason attacked them before being dragged off by Steven. He was later found dead by Batwoman.
- Whitney Hutchison (portrayed by Nevis Unipan) - A young girl who was abducted by Killer Croc 2.0 by the river. When she had a broken leg in the sewer due to Killer Croc 2.0's attack, Whitney was nearly eaten by Killer Croc 2.0 before being saved by Batwoman. While being loaded into the ambulance, Whitney was reunited with her mother.
- Nora Fries (portrayed by Jennifer Higgin) - The wife of Mr. Freeze who was released from cryogenic stasis after a cure for her disease was found and ended up in Arkham Asylum due to her disoriented mental state. After escaping three years later, Nora's age started to catch up to her and is now an old woman. She no longer wants her loved ones to sacrifice their lives to save hers and is content with living out her final years in peace with her sister.
- Dee Smitty (portrayed by June B. Wilde) - A processing desk worker at the GCPD who is Nora's sister. When Nora was released from stasis and given a cure for her disease, and started to have her age catch up to her after escaping Arkham, Dora worked to take care of Nora. She studied Mr. Freeze's notes and stole her brother-in-law's serum from the GCPD in an attempt to prolong her sister's life again, which led them to be targeted by mercenaries until Batwoman saved them.
- Charlie Clark (portrayed by Tom Lenk) - The head of Wayne Enterprise's public relations department since Lucius Fox was still alive.
- Black Glove - A crime syndicate operating in Gotham City that was founded by Marla Elliot and consisting of elite families with goals to "fix" their troubled children and dispose of any witnesses to their activities. Jada Jet is associated with this group.
  - Virgil Getty (portrayed by Josh Blacker) - An operative of Black Glove who has been conducting experiments with the freeze serum so that Jada Jet can preserve Marquis until a cure for his mental condition can be found. A Poison Ivy-controlled Mary later found Virgil and buried him up to his neck in soil by the time Batwoman and Alice find him. While chained up in the sewer near Wayne Enterprise, Virgil is visited by Sophie upon being told by Alice. Using a blowtorch for torture, Sophie learns from him that Tommy Elliot's mother was involved with Black Glove. While Sophie argues with Batwoman, Virgil strangles himself to death on the chains suspending on him.
  - Barbara Kean (portrayed by Sara J. Southey) - The ex-wife of Jim Gordon, owner of an art gallery, and member of the Black Glove.
  - Burton Crowne (portrayed by Eric Ruggieri) - Member of the Black Glove. He and the other Black Glove members were abducted by Marquis where he bludgeoned Crowne to death with a baseball bat.
  - Jeremiah Arkham (portrayed by Glen Ferguson) - Member of the Black Glove. He and the other members were abducted by Marquis where he killed Arkham offscreen.
  - Mario Falcone (portrayed by Marcio Barauna) - Member of the Black Glove. He and the other members were abducted by Marquis where he killed Falcone offscreen.
- Lazlo Valentin / Professor Pyg (portrayed by Rob Nagle) - A former criminal who later became Jada Jet's chef in her office's dining hall. After being fired and losing his family, Valentine became Professor Pyg again and planned revenge on Jada. He fought Ryan and Sophie before being killed by Marquis.
- Franklin Jet (portrayed by Kevin Mundy) - The former CEO of Jeturian Industries, husband of Jada and father of Marquis. He dies when Marquis sets off his peanut butter allergy by putting peanut butter on his hamburger during a family camping trip, with Franklin not having his epipen on him.
- Zoey (portrayed by Victoria Dunsmore) - The girlfriend of Marquis. During dinner with Jada and Marquis, Zoey is killed by Professor Pyg.
- Damien (portrayed by Guy Fauchon) - The butler of the Jet family.
- Chris Hayner (portrayed by Josh Collins) - A man who a Poison Ivy-controlled Mary entombed in a honeycomb with honeybees on it. While in Mary's clinic, he recognized her as the culprit when the bandages were removed from his eyes.
- Pamela Isley / Poison Ivy (portrayed by Bridget Regan) - A former botany student of Gotham University, who was a passionate, brilliant scientist with a mind for changing the world for the better. Pamela's plans shifted when she was experimented on by a colleague named Mark LeGrand who injected her with various plant toxins, turning her into Poison Ivy.
- Kiki Roulette (portrayed by Judy Reyes) - A toymaker and former minion of Joker who made the joy buzzer that Joker wielded. At one point, she helped Joker kill Robin with a crowbar. While Mary and Alice track down Kiki who was under the alias of Kathleen Rogers in order to get the joy buzzer fixed, it is revealed that she is in cahoots with Marquis Jet and her former therapist was Harley Quinn. While Batwoman rescues Mary and Alice from Marquis' minions, Kiki escapes and meets up with Marquis while also revealing that the joy buzzer only has one shock in it due to being corroded inside. Alice later tries to force Kiki to make another buzzer for the former, but Marquis shoots Kiki dead.
- Jack Napier / Joker (portrayed by Nathan Dashwood) - The self-proclaimed "Clown Prince of Crime" and enemy of Batman. He was responsible for the bus hijacking where he used a joybuzzer on Marquis Jet's head and ran Gabi Kane's car off the road as well as a vandalized portrait that contained the location of Coryana. Joker was said to have died in battle against Batman where the public believed that he was still incarcerated at Arkham Asylum.

== See also ==
- List of Arrowverse actors
