= Ernest Waddell =

American actor

- Born: July 22, 1982 (age 43); New York City, New York, U.S.
- Education: New York University BFA Tisch School of the Arts, Bishop McNamara High School
- Occupations: Actor; painter; photographer
- Years active: 2003–present
- Website: http://www.ernestwaddell.com

Ernest Waddell (born July 22, 1982) is a New York City-based actor. He is perhaps best known for his recurring roles on two television series: Fin Tutuola's son Ken Randall on Law & Order: Special Victims Unit, and Omar Little's boyfriend Dante on The Wire. His credits also include the television series As the World Turns and One Tree Hill, and the film The Poker Game. He is also an abstract painter and photographer.

== Biography ==
Ernest Waddell grew up in Bowie, Maryland. He developed an interest in acting and attended a summer program at the Oxford School of Drama before enrolling at New York University. When accepting his first recurring role, Waddell was apprehensive because he thought that appearances in The Wire would lead to him being typecast. Having appeared multiple times on Law & Order: Special Victims Unit, Waddell has stated that a big difference compared to The Wire is that SVU films under heavier time constraints.

Two of Waddell's favorite shows are Cosmos: A Personal Voyage and The Blue Planet. Ernest has also directed numerous short films. Connected to this is his work on www.imontvbitch.com, a self-help actor website, turned experimental video hub, which he co-founded with actor Brandon Scott. Referring to Waddell, Victoria Cartagena has stated that the two of them were cast in The Bedford Diaries because he helped her practice lines while waiting for an audition.

== Filmography ==
Film or Television Title	Character	Episodes	Year(s)
Seasons of Youth	Flint Williams	--	2003
Third Watch	Tony	1 episode	2004
The Wire	Dante	9 episodes	2003–2004
As the World Turns	Curtis Harris	9 episodes	2005
Rock the Paint	Student Protester	--	2005
Kiss Me Again	Student 3	--	2006
The Bedford Diaries	Lee Hemingway	8 episodes	2006
Stutter	Shep	--	2007
One Tree Hill	Derek Sommers	6 episodes	2006–2008
CSI: Miami	MDPD Officer	1 episode	2009
Buppies	Shaka	4 episodes	2009
Mother Country	Clark	--	2011
Absence of Love	James	--	2012
About Cherry	Vaughn	--	2012
Law & Order: Special Victims Unit	Ken Randall	12 episodes	2003–2021
Happy Baby	Police Officer	--	2014
What We Talk About When We Talk About Zombies	Steve	--	2015
