= Pick Your Poison =

Pick Your Poison may refer to:

- "Pick Your Poison" (Good Girls)
- "Pick Your Poison" (Batwoman)
- Pick Your Poison (album)
- "Pick Your Poison", an episode of Canada's Drag Race season 6
