= Mad Hatter (DC Comics) =

Fictional DC Comics character

- Mad Hatter taken from the cover of Gotham Central #20 (August 2004); Art by Michael Lark.

Publication information
- Publisher: DC Comics
- First appearance: Batman #49 (October 1948)
- Created by: Bill Finger (writer); Lew Sayre Schwartz (artist); Bob Kane (concept)

In-story information
- Alter ego: Jervis Tetch
- Species: Human
- Team affiliations: Secret Six; Secret Society of Super Villains; Wonderland Gang
- Abilities: Genius-level intellect; Mind control techniques

The Mad Hatter (Jervis Tetch) is a supervillain appearing in American comic books published by DC Comics, commonly as an adversary of the superhero Batman. He is modeled after the Hatter from Lewis Carroll's novel Alice's Adventures in Wonderland, a character often called the "Mad Hatter" in adaptations of Carroll. A scientist who invents and uses technological mind control devices to influence and manipulate the minds of his victims, the Mad Hatter is one of Batman's most enduring enemies and belongs to the collective of adversaries that make up Batman's rogues gallery.

The Mad Hatter has been substantially adapted from the comics into various forms of media, including feature films, television series, and video games. He has been voiced by Roddy McDowall in the DC animated universe and Peter MacNicol in the Batman: Arkham video game series, among others. He has also been portrayed in live-action by David Wayne in the 1960s Batman series, and Benedict Samuel in the Fox series Gotham. A variation of the character named Liam Crandle appeared in the third season premiere of the Arrowverse series Batwoman, portrayed by Amitai Marmorstein.

== Publication history and characterization ==
Created by Bill Finger and Lew Sayre Schwartz, the Mad Hatter made his first appearance in Batman #49 (October 1948). Jervis Tetch is fascinated with hats of all shapes and sizes, as well as the Lewis Carroll's children's book Alice's Adventures in Wonderland and its sequel Through the Looking-Glass, particularly favoring the chapter "A Mad Tea Party". According to Dr. Blakloch of Arkham Asylum:

Jervis is obsessive-compulsive, and highly delusional. He's got an immature self-image, so he identifies more with children than adults. Oh and he's a genius, too. (BPD)

Blakloch also notes that when agitated, Tetch begins rhyming as a defence mechanism. Tetch often quotes and makes reference to Carroll's Wonderland novels, and sometimes even fails to discern between these stories and reality. In addition to his obsession with Lewis Carroll, Tetch has also shown an additional obsession with hats. In Secret Six, he will not eat a piece of food that does not have a hat on it, and states that he is not interested in the sight of his naked teammate Knockout because she is not wearing a hat. In the graphic novel Arkham Asylum: A Serious House on Serious Earth, it is strongly implied that he is a pedophile. His storylines in Streets of Gotham #4 and Jeph Loeb and Tim Sale's Batman: Haunted Knight also imply an unhealthy fixation on children, such as when he kidnaps a young Barbara Gordon and forces her into a tea party dressed as Alice, as well as kidnapping other runaway children and dressing them up like characters from Alice's Adventures in Wonderland.

== Fictional character biography ==
=== Backstory ===
Growing up, Tetch was a lonely, awkward child, shunned by other children and living in his own fantasy world. As an adult, he becomes a neuroscientist, and at some point moves into a boarding house owned by Ella Littleton. There he befriends Ella's daughter, Connie, and her friends in her junior high school computer club, sometimes helping them with their projects. A few years later, when Connie is in high school, she gets pregnant. Fearing the reaction of her extremely strict mother, Connie lies to her and claims she had been raped by someone on her high school's baseball team, the Gotham Hawks. Ella, in turn, approaches Tetch for help and convinces him that the Gotham Hawks are "bad kids". Tetch agrees to use his mind control technology on a member of the team, making him use a pipe bomb to kill the other players. Although this is Tetch's first known criminal act, his involvement in the locker room bombing would not be discovered until years later.

=== Criminal career ===
==== Golden Age ====
Jervis Tetch / The Mad Hatter in his first appearance in Batman #49 (October 1948).

In his first appearance as the Mad Hatter, Tetch attempts to steal a trophy from the Gotham Yacht Club, and begins a crime spree that ends when he is foiled by Batman while he is trying to rob spectators from a high society horseshow. Tetch is subsequently sent to Arkham Asylum (although his fate is not revealed until Detective Comics #510). The Mad Hatter is not seen again in the Golden Age of Comic Books.

==== Silver Age ====
Beginning with Detective Comics #230 and then throughout the Silver Age of Comic Books, an impostor Mad Hatter appears and clashes with Batman many times. He is revealed as an impostor when the Mad Hatter finally reappears, claiming to have "disposed of the impostor" (although the impostor would return one last time in Detective Comics #573 in 1987). Accompanied by several henchmen and a pet chimpanzee (named "Carroll Lewis", although the Mad Hatter claims that the chimp refuses to tell him how it came to have that moniker), the Mad Hatter kidnaps Lucius Fox, the C.E.O. of Wayne Tech. Although he holds Fox for ransom, the Mad Hatter also unveils a device allowing him to copy the knowledge in Fox's brain, which he intends to use to make an additional fortune. However, Fox is rescued by Batman, who also captures the Mad Hatter and his henchmen.

The Mad Hatter's next appearance marks the first time he is portrayed in comics with the mind-controlling devices for which he would eventually become best known. Allying himself with other villains in an attempt to kill Batman, Hatter uses a mind-controlling hat on Scarecrow, forcing the villain (who had been paralyzed with fear) to fight. When Batman overcomes his attackers, Tetch flees and appears to die on a bridge under the wheels of a train. In actuality he had escaped by jumping onto a truck that had been passing underneath the bridge. Subsequent encounters with Batman resulted in Tetch being sent to Arkham.

During another early encounter with Batman, the Mad Hatter escapes from Arkham in time for Halloween, and makes his home in an old mansion that had been abandoned after a gruesome murder years before. Retreating deeply into his delusions about Wonderland, Tetch offers sanctuary to runaway children, asking them in return to dress up as characters from Alice in Wonderland and attend his tea parties, where he serves them drugged tea to keep them sedated. Around this time, the teenage Barbara Gordon comes to Gotham City, having been adopted by her uncle, Commissioner Jim Gordon, following the death of her parents. Barbara sneaks out against her uncle's orders, and goes to Gotham Park, where she soon finds herself being chased by a group of masked men with knives. The group surround her, and begin implying that they will molest or rape her, provoking her to scream for help. The Mad Hatter appears and scares the men away with his gun. Tetch takes her to his "Wonderland", where she is expected to play the role of Alice. When she refuses to drink tea and asks to leave, Tetch angrily smashes a teapot, scaring another of the runaways into sneaking away while Tetch's attention is on Barbara. The boy leads the police and Batman to Tetch's hideout, and Tetch is defeated by Batman while Commissioner Gordon rescues Barbara.

When Black Orchid visits Arkham Asylum, attempting to find out more about her past from Poison Ivy, she is assisted by Tetch. After Ivy refuses to help Orchid, Tetch tries to cheer her up. He also reveals he has been helping other inmates at Arkham, such as bringing Ivy things to make her plant-animal hybrids with. "I believe in helping people," he explains. "We were all put here for a purpose, I say. But it's still nice to get a thank-you." Tetch is delighted to receive a small flower as thanks for his help. Tetch is also aware of Animal Man's identity as Buddy Baker. He is seen laughing hysterically in Arkham with the final page of "The Return with the Man of the Animal Powers", the second Animal Man story, after which he is dragged back to his cell.

In the Knightfall saga, the Mad Hatter is the first to strike, following the breakout from Arkham. He invites all criminals to a tea party to which Batman and Robin would come. One of the criminals was Film Freak, on whom Tetch uses a mind control device, sending him to find the person that broke them out of Arkham. Batman and Robin come and defeat the Mad Hatter as Film Freak is defeated by Bane. In Robin: Year One, millionaire third-world dictator Generalissimo Lee hires the Mad Hatter to kidnap a number of young girls using his mind control devices. The Mad Hatter does so by implanting the devices in Walkmen, which he gives out to girls at Dick Grayson's school. The young Robin manages to defeat the Mad Hatter, however.

Another plan consisted of implanting his devices in "free coffee and donuts" tickets he handed out in front of the police stations in Gotham. That plan had him controlling most of the cops in the city, inciting them to steal for him, and ultimately to riot. He even had Gotham police detectives Crispus Allen and Renee Montoya break into a bank for him. Sasha Bordeaux helped Batman stop him this time around. The Mad Hatter shows up in Gotham City after it is rocked by a devastating earthquake. He adds to his body count, callously murdering a policeman. His goal is to unearth a trove of valuables, which in the end turn out to be classic hats. Tetch's role in the deaths of the Gotham Hawks High School Baseball team is eventually discovered by detectives in the Gotham City Police Department. Tetch, imprisoned at Arkham at the time, is interviewed to try to find his motive. After sending the police away, telling them that the team had been "bad kids" and that they "deserved it", Tetch contacts Ella Littleton and warns her that the police might uncover her role in the bombing. Tetch had given her one of his mind-controlling hats years before, which she used to try to take control of a guard and try to help Tetch escape from Arkham. The Hatter is caught as he tries to escape, and the mind-controlled guard fires on police before dying in return fire. Tetch himself is shot multiple times and left in critical condition. Distraught at the news, Elle Littleton inadvertently tells her daughter Connie that Tetch had killed the team for her, to "avenge her honor". Connie informs the police of everything that had happened, and Ella Littleton is arrested. While working with Black Mask, the Mad Hatter implants a mind control chip directly into Killer Croc's brain, which causes him to mutate again due to the virus he had been injected with by Hush and the Riddler. Killer Croc embarks on a quest to get payback on those responsible for his mutation, and starts with the Mad Hatter. Batman arrives in time to save him, but Killer Croc escapes. During Infinite Crisis, the Mad Hatter is first seen being roundly beaten by Argus, and then later fighting with the Secret Society of Super Villains during the Battle of Metropolis.

=== "One Year Later"/Secret Six ===
During One Year Later, Tetch is revealed to have been involved in the plot by the Great White Shark to frame Harvey Dent for murdering various Gotham criminals in the Detective Comics storyline Face The Face. The capacity in which he is involved is left vague, however. Tetch's base of operations in Gotham City is destroyed following a search for an atomic weapon, by the former Robin, Tim Drake, and the current Captain Boomerang, Owen Mercer. A recording of Tetch appears on a monitor screen and tells them that the roof will be the final hat they will ever wear as it falls down on them. Robin and Boomerang narrowly escape the building. He is later approached by Catman, and he joins the members of the Secret Six to oppose the Secret Society of Super Villains; they have recruited him in hopes of a defense against Doctor Psycho's mind control abilities. When Rag Doll attacks the Secret Six under Psycho's control, Tetch puts on what he calls his "thinking cap" and goes into a seizure. After the Six crash-land, they are attacked by the Doom Patrol, who come close to apprehending the Six until Mad Hatter steps in and uses his mind control abilities to subdue the Doom Patrol singlehandedly, going so far as to almost make Elasti-Girl eat Beast Boy before Scandal Savage stops him.

In a later issue of Secret Six, Tetch reveals that he has designed a hat to make him happy beyond the measures of what illegal drugs can. He also states that he has planted miniature listening devices around the House of Secrets to keep tabs on his fellow members. After revealing the true motives of Scandal Savage to leave the team, the Secret Six go after her, finding themselves at Vandal Savage's temple in the mountains, where Doctor Psycho starts attacking the team. Tetch easily gets the upper hand on Psycho until Cheshire appears and stabs him in the back with a poisoned dagger. Scandal tends to Hatter's wound, and Catman gives him an antidote. While the Six face off against Cheshire and Vandal Savage, Hatter takes on Psycho one on one, and emerges victorious despite his injuries, gravely injuring Psycho with Cheshire's dagger. At the end of the miniseries, Hatter saves Scandal from falling to her death, and the Six befriend him. As Hatter stands atop Savage's destroyed base with Rag Doll, he promises to be a very good friend in return. Rag Doll then pushes Hatter off the roof, seemingly to his death, saying there was "only room for one dandy freak on the team". However, it is revealed on the final page that Tetch survived the fall. Heartbroken, he vows revenge on the rest of the Six. Prior to the events of Gotham Underground, Tetch falls victim to his own mind control devices at the hands of Tweedledum and Tweedledee. The two force him to "lead" a gang of Wonderland-related criminals called the Wonderland Gang through various gimmicky heists before Batman deduces the Tweeds to be the true masterminds. Once the three are returned to Arkham, the Hatter quickly exacts revenge on the two, manipulating them into a bloody brawl with his mind control chips.

=== Gotham Underground and Salvation Run ===
More recently, Mad Hatter appears in Gotham Underground #1 (August 2007), alongside Scarecrow, Hugo Strange, the Penguin, and Two-Face, who have gathered together to assist him in escaping Gotham in light of the disappearance of other villains due to the Suicide Squad and Amanda Waller kidnapping and deporting villains offworld in Countdown to Final Crisis. During their meeting, however, the Suicide Squad break into the building and arrests them. He is later seen on the Hell World in Salvation Run #2 (January 2008), confirming that he has been deported off-world. He appears briefly during the final issue as the Parademons attack, and escapes the Hell Planet alive via Lex Luthor's teleportation device.

=== DC Infinite Halloween Special ===
In the first issue of DC Infinite Halloween Special, Hatter recounts a first-person perspective story of a small boy whose parents are murdered before his eyes by a blood-sucking humanoid bat. The story follows closely the actual origin story of Batman and is a close approximation of the Red Rain 'universe' (noted in the Countdown Presents: The Search for Ray Palmer series as Earth-43), wherein Batman is, in fact, a vampire.

=== "Final Crisis" ===
In the 2008 DC storyline "Final Crisis", Dan Turpin has been approached by the Question with regards to a recent string of child disappearances related to a mysterious group called the Dark Side Club. Turpin subsequently discovers that the club is led by Darkseid, who has taken on a human form after the events of "Death of the New Gods". He is gathering a group of children together and infusing them with the Anti-Life Equation as part of his broader plan to enslave and devastate the human race. In Final Crisis #2 (2008), Turpin discovers that Tetch played an instrumental role in assisting Darkseid in gathering the children together through the use of his mind-control hats. Turpin, overcome with a violent rage that he himself does not understand, viciously beats Tetch. Upon threats of brain damage, Tetch confesses that the children have been taken to Blüdhaven. Confused and unsure of himself, Turpin then leaves and boards a bus to Blüdhaven. Final Crisis Secret Files and Origins #1 also reveals that Darkseid's Justifiers helmets are a combination of Apokoliptic technology and the Hatter's mind control circuitry.

=== Secret Six redux ===
Secret Six #6 (February 2009) reveals that Mad Hatter has hired the Six to break Tarantula out of Alcatraz, to deliver her as well as a "Get Out of Hell Free" card created by Neron to Gotham City. Doing so has put the Six directly in the line of retribution from Junior, Ragdoll's psychotic sister. Junior believes that the Neron card is key to saving her soul from eternal damnation, and will stop at nothing to reclaim it from Tarantula and the Six. It seems that Junior's wrath is not the motivation behind Tetch's hiring the Six to perform this mission. He has made it clear his intention is to ensure the Six safely reach Gotham. The story is ongoing, and Tetch's full plan has yet to be revealed, although it is made clear in the same issue that Tetch intends to murder each member of the Six as part of his revenge. Tetch observes as the Six battle Junior and his goons on Gotham Bridge and when the battle ceases he confronts them, telling them how they betrayed him. Rag Doll throws Tetch's hat over the edge and Tetch jumps off after it.

=== "Batman: Life After Death" ===
Tetch next shows up, seemingly uninjured from his battle with the Secret Six, working with the Penguin, who is planning on killing the new Black Mask. He assists the Penguin in attaching a mind control device to a gas mask, which is placed on Batman's head to turn him into a puppet to assassinate Black Mask. The plot fails, and Batman recovers before killing Black Mask. Following this, Tetch is shown once again incarcerated in Arkham. He hires Deathstroke and the Titans to free him, and escapes just prior to a massive prison riot.

=== The New 52 ===
In September 2011, The New 52 rebooted DC's continuity. In this new timeline, Jervis Tetch is portrayed as suffering from hypogonadism, which prevents him from physically maturing. He begins taking testosterone-enhancing drugs that permanently impair his mental stability. His parents commit him to Arkham Asylum after he has a drug-induced psychotic breakdown, during which he begins referring to himself as "the Mad Hatter". He is eventually freed by the White Rabbit. He uses his mind control technology to make a passenger train full of people commit suicide, assisted by his henchmen, the Tweed Brothers. He then uses his technology to drive several Gothamites insane. Batman eventually foils his plan and throws him through a glass rooftop.

Mad Hatter and the Tweed Brothers next appear after Black Mask escapes Arkham Asylum. When Black Mask attempts to regain control over his False Face Society, he comes into conflict with the Mad Hatter, who sees Black Mask as a rival due to Black Mask's similar mind control abilities. Both the Mad Hatter and Black Mask engage in battle, only for Batman to intervene and subdue them both.

The Mad Hatter resurfaces, selling his mind control hats all over Gotham and holding casting calls at his missile launch facility base, all to recreate a “perfect day” he had years before at a theme park with his childhood sweetheart, Alice. He creates a replica of the theme park in his base and brainwashes the wearers of his hats to attend as "guests". Tetch then goes to Alice's house, only to find that she is now a drug addict and alcoholic; in anger, he beats her to death. He attempts to cast a new Alice with “mind controlled girls”, but ultimately kills them for falling short of his ideal. In frustration, he makes his mind control subjects walk into the sewer and drown themselves.

The Mad Hatter becomes obsessed with Bruce Wayne's new girlfriend, Natalya Trusevich, and has the Tweed Brothers kidnap her. She spurns the Mad Hatter's advances, but he realizes she knows Batman's secret identity and torture her for the information. In the end, she refuses to give the information, and he throws her out of a helicopter to her death. An enraged Batman hunts him down and nearly drowns him, only to revive him at the last minute when his conscience gets the better of him.

== Characterization ==
=== Skills and abilities ===
While the Mad Hatter has no inherent superpowers, he is a 'neurotechnician' with considerable knowledge on how to dominate and control the human mind, either through hypnosis or direct technological means. Usually, the Hatter places his mind control devices in the brims of hats, but has been known to utilize other devices as well. More recently, he has been able to directly influence the minds of others at a distance without any apparent equipment. However, this is most likely not a newly emerging superhuman ability; more likely, his skill at miniaturizing and concealing technology, and advances upon his original technology, have probably allowed him to develop technology that permits him to use a device hidden upon his person (such as in his hat) to project mind controlling powers in the manner of a meta-human ability such as telepathic powers.

The Mad Hatter is not above using his own inventions on himself, such as creating a hat that can cause him both extreme bliss, as well as return him to lucidity when he deems it necessary. Despite his small stature, the Mad Hatter has been known to exhibit surprising strength and agility from time to time. In the graphic novel Madness, the Mad Hatter is shown as impressively holding his own in a fistfight with Batman atop a moving train.

=== Appearance ===
The Mad Hatter has gone through many changes in his physical appearance over the years, but the basic look remains the same. In his debut, he was a very short brown (or auburn) haired man. When he reappeared in the early 1980s, he was depicted as of average height, with blonde hair. In later years, he was short again but with white hair. Today, Tetch has red hair much like his impostor did, but his size and height still seem to vary. Constants throughout his depictions are a slightly overlarge head and (more recently) very large teeth. In Secret Six #6 (December 2006), Tetch claims to suffer from macrocephaly.

== Other characters named Mad Hatter ==
The impostor Mad Hatter

After the real Jervis Tetch/Mad Hatter had been sent to Arkham Asylum following his debut, a very different Mad Hatter appeared, who claimed to be Jervis Tetch. This Mad Hatter first appeared in Detective Comics #230 (April 1956) by Bill Finger, and Sheldon Moldoff, and, unlike the original, was tall, red-headed, stocky and sported a gaudy mustache. He was primarily a thief who was obsessed with completing his private collection of hats from all nations, cultures, and historical periods. He often constructed various weaponry concealed inside his hats like flamethrowers and buzzsaws.

The headgear he wanted most was, of course, Batman's cowl. In numerous attempts, he tried to de-cowl Batman. After many tries, he was successful by spraying the cowl with a radioactive substance. Batman then went to nuclear lab and as he was preparing to leave, he set off the radiation detectors. He then had to remove it and handed it to one of Mad Hatter's henchmen who was disguised as one of the lab workers. No sooner did the Mad Hatter put it in his collection than Batman and Robin arrived. They had traced the cowl with their "super sensitive Geiger counter" in the Batplane.

Later on, in Batman #297 (March 1978), the impostor Mad Hatter claimed to have gone straight, but that turned out to be a lie. In 1981, it was revealed that he was an impostor when the real Jervis Tetch returned. The real Hatter claimed to have killed his impostor, but the impostor Mad Hatter reappeared alive in 1987 in Detective Comics #573, where he ended up being beaten by Batman. He was treated to a cameo appearance in Secret Origins (vol. 2) #44 (1989) where he is seen in his cell at Arkham making paper hats in the story "His Name is Clayface III". Upon seeing him, one Arkham guard tells another: "He could murder ya a thousand different ways if we let 'im have any real hat--! But that doesn't stop him from tryin'!" The impostor Mad Hatter appeared in Batman #700 (2010) under the moniker the "Hatman", as well as in a flashback to his time as the Mad Hatter.

== Alternative versions ==
- The Jervis Tetch incarnation of the Mad Hatter appears in Batman (1943). This version is a computer programmer. After discovering his products were depleting the ozone layer, he is betrayed, injected with hallucinogens from his industry, and sent to Arkham Asylum by his business partners to prevent him from reporting them to the EPA. There, he realized what had happened despite being driven insane, became obsessed with hats, and sought to use them to seek revenge. To do so, he gives Arkham's warden a rigged hat to secretly take control of the asylum before sending hats to his business partners to make them commit suicide. He would continue to experiment with his hats and fellow prisoners and use them to rob banks until Tetch is stopped by Batman and Harvey Dent.
- An alternate universe version of the Mad Hatter makes a cameo appearance in Batman: Crimson Mist, in which he is killed by a vampiric Batman.
- The Jervis Tetch incarnation of the Mad Hatter appears in Batman/Teenage Mutant Ninja Turtles. While incarcerated in Arkham Asylum, he is mutated into an anthropomorphic rabbit by the Shredder before he is eventually cured and transferred to A.R.G.U.S.'s custody.
- An alternate timeline version of Jervis Tetch appears in Batman: White Knight.
- The Mad Hatter makes a cameo appearance in Mother Panic: Gotham A.D., in which he is killed by the Joker.

== In other media ==
=== Television ===
==== Live-action ====
- The Jervis Tetch incarnation of the Mad Hatter appears in Batman (1966), portrayed by David Wayne. This version resembles the imposter Mad Hatter as the series was produced before he was revealed as such. Additionally, he wears a trick top hat containing mechanical eyes capable of firing hypnotic beams that render victims unconscious and is obsessed with stealing hats, particularly Batman's cowl.
- Jervis Tetch appears in Gotham, portrayed by Benedict Samuel. Introduced in the third season, this version is a professional hypnotist who can control people's minds via his voice and a "ticking" device. He is also known for dressing himself, his henchmen, and his victims as characters from Lewis Carroll's Alice's Adventures in Wonderland as well as creating a virus from his sister Alice's blood that turns people into homicidal maniacs. In the fourth season, Tetch joins Jerome Valeska's "Legion of Horribles" to assist them in spreading chaos throughout Gotham and acquires his "Mad Hatter" moniker from Oswald Cobblepot. In the fifth season, Tetch is put in charge of Ace Chemicals and brainwashes Jim Gordon and Leslie Thompkins in an effort to make Bruce Wayne relive his parents' death.
- An original incarnation of the Mad Hatter inspired by the imposter named Liam Crandle appears in the Batwoman episode "Mad as a Hatter", portrayed by Amitai Marmorstein. He is a mentally ill teenager and a fan of Alice, seeing her as a victim of society. After buying Jervis Tetch's hat online, he uses it to take Mary Hamilton's graduation ceremony hostage, only to be foiled by Batwoman, Batwing, and Alice. Crandle is later incarcerated while Tetch's hat is confiscated.

==== Animation ====
- The Jervis Tetch incarnation of the Mad Hatter appears in The Batman/Superman Hour episode "A Mad, Mad Tea Party", voiced by Ted Knight. This version has trained white rabbits, a hat-shaped car, and henchmen dressed as Wonderland characters.
- The Batman (1966) incarnation of the Jervis Tetch / Mad Hatter appears in Batman: The Brave and the Bold.
- The Jervis Tetch incarnation of the Mad Hatter appears in the Young Justice: Outsiders episode "Triptych", voiced by Dwight Schultz. This version is a member of Simon Stagg's metahuman trafficking operation.
- The Jervis Tetch incarnation of the Mad Hatter appears in the Harley Quinn episode "Another Sharkley Adventure", voiced by Griffin Newman. This version comes off as a creep and pervert to others due to his abnormal behavior, though he repeatedly denies these claims. Tetch kidnaps Harley Quinn and Batgirl and attempts to use them as test subjects for his mind-controlling hats, with which he plans to enslave Gotham's citizens, though the former manages to talk him into releasing her by claiming they are both villains. However, Harley quickly regrets abandoning Batgirl and returns to rescue her. After Batgirl comments that Harley is not as villainous as she believes herself to be, the latter kills Tetch to prove her otherwise.
- The Jervis Tetch incarnation of the Mad Hatter appears in Bat-Fam, voiced by Aristotle Athari. This version has a daughter, college graduate Stella Tetch / Sad Hatter, and a son named Stanley Tetch / Glad Hatter.
- A female character loosely based on the Mad Hatter named Hattie Tetch appears in Batman: Caped Crusader, voiced by Laraine Newman. Inspired by Hedda Hopper, Hattie is the witty, fast-talking host of the Hattie's Tea Party talk show. She is later killed by Joker with his deadly toxin.

===== DC Animated Universe =====
Jervis Tetch/The Mad Hatter as depicted in Batman: The Animated Series.

The Mad Hatter as he was later depicted in The New Batman Adventures.

The Jervis Tetch incarnation of the Mad Hatter appears in series set in the DC Animated Universe (DCAU), voiced by Roddy McDowall. This version is a blond British man with a large overbite that gives him a Cheshire Cat-like smile.

- Introduced in the Batman: The Animated Series episode "Mad as a Hatter", Tetch is a technical and electronics genius who experiments with animals using mind-controlling microchips stored within hats to stimulate brain waves. He lusts for his secretary, Alice Pleasance, who does not reciprocate his feelings. Donning the guise of the Mad Hatter and using Alice in Wonderland as inspiration, he attempts to win Alice's affection by taking her out on the town after her boyfriend breaks up with her. However, she misinterprets the gesture as a way to cheer her up and unwittingly spurns his affections. Driven over the edge, Tetch uses his microchips to turn Alice into his robotic puppet until Batman defeats him. Episode writer Paul Dini once claimed that the episode was inspired by a true story involving a technical designer who had unrequited feelings for someone at work and committed a workplace shooting. In the episode "Perchance to Dream", Tetch uses an electronic helmet to trap Batman in a virtual reality realm that gives him his greatest desires in an attempt to remove the Dark Knight from his life. Once he gets free however, Batman defeats Tetch and leaves him for the police. In the episode "The Worry Men", Tetch creates the eponymous dolls using his chips to hypnotize Gotham's elite into giving him large sums of money so he can acquire an island where he can live in peace. However, Batman stops him and gives Tetch his own "Worry Man" to stop him from committing more crimes. Tetch also makes minor appearances in the episodes "Trial" and "Make 'Em Laugh".
- Tetch returns in The New Batman Adventures. For this series, he was redesigned to resemble a short, thin, rodent-like man with a paler complexion and dark green outfit.
- Tetch appears in the Superman: The Animated Series episode "Knight Time". After discovering Bruce Wayne was hypnotized by nanites, Superman and Robin join forces to find Tetch, who they believe is the culprit. Upon capturing him however, Tetch speculates that the nanites are of extraterrestrial origin. The heroes later discover the nanites were created by Brainiac.

=== Film ===
- The Mad Hatter was considered by Mark Protosevich to appear in Batman Unchained, with Rowan Atkinson and Robin Williams being considered for the role, but was dropped in favor of the Scarecrow and Harley Quinn.
- The Jervis Tetch incarnation of the Mad Hatter appears in Batman: Bad Blood, voiced by Robin Atkin Downes. This version works for the League of Assassins as one of Talia al Ghul's henchmen and helped turn Heretic into the perfect soldier for the League. After Heretic captures Batman, Tetch reprograms his mind to follow Talia's orders and reveal his and his allies' secrets. Batman helps the League infiltrate the World Tech Summit and take over Wayne Enterprises' technology while Tetch brainwashes the attending politicians and dignitaries into obeying Talia. However, he is killed by a system overload caused in the ensuing battle between Batman's allies and Talia's henchmen.
- The Mad Hatter makes a cameo appearance in Batman Unlimited: Mechs vs. Mutants, voiced by an uncredited Alastair Duncan.
- The Batman (1966) incarnation of the Jervis Tetch / Mad Hatter makes a cameo appearance in Batman: Return of the Caped Crusaders.
- The Batman (1966) incarnation of the Jervis Tetch / Mad Hatter makes a cameo appearance in Scooby-Doo! & Batman: The Brave and the Bold.
- The Jervis Tetch incarnation of the Mad Hatter makes a non-speaking cameo appearance in Injustice.
- The Jervis Tetch incarnation of the Mad Hatter appears in Batman: The Long Halloween, voiced by John DiMaggio.
- The Jervis Tetch incarnation of the Mad Hatter appears in Batman: Knightfall, voiced by Jason Flemyng.

=== Video games ===
- The Mad Hatter appears as a boss in The Adventures of Batman & Robin. This version's appearance is based on that of the Batman: The Animated Series version coupled with elongated eyelashes on his left eye similarly to Alex DeLarge's. Additionally, he commands an army of robots based on characters from Alice in Wonderland.
- The Mad Hatter appears in DC Universe Online, voiced by Aaron Mace.
- The Mad Hatter appears in Scribblenauts Unmasked: A DC Comics Adventure.

==== Lego Batman ====
- The Jervis Tetch incarnation of the Mad Hatter appears as a boss and unlockable character in Lego Batman: The Videogame, with vocal effects provided by Chris Edgerly. This version is one of the Joker's lieutenants and is armed with a small handgun.
- The Mad Hatter appears as an optional side boss and unlockable playable character in Lego Batman 2: DC Super Heroes, voiced by Townsend Coleman.
- The Mad Hatter appears as a playable character in Lego Batman 3: Beyond Gotham, voiced by Nolan North.
- The Batman: The Animated Series incarnation of Jervis Tetch / Mad Hatter appears as a playable character in Lego DC Super-Villains via the "Batman: The Animated Series Level Pack" DLC.

==== Batman: Arkham ====
The Jervis Tetch incarnation of the Mad Hatter appears in the Batman: Arkham series, voiced by Peter MacNicol.

- According to Batman: Arkham Asylum writer Paul Dini, the Mad Hatter was originally planned to appear in the game via a level where Batman discovers him in a child's hedge maze within the titular asylum's Botanical Gardens. However, the idea did not fit the game's tone and the Mad Hatter's appearance was dropped.
- In Tetch's first physical appearance in Batman: Arkham City, it is revealed that Hugo Strange manipulated him into conducting inhumane behavior control experiments on Arkham Asylum patients in exchange for a consistent supply of tea and multiple "Alices" for Tetch to do with as he pleases. He is additionally an inmate of Strange's city-prison, Arkham City, where he has formed a small gang of mind-controlled henchmen.
- In the prequel Batman: Arkham Origins, a younger Tetch has yet to call himself the Mad Hatter, struggles to perfect his mind control technology, and has his first encounter with Batman after challenging him to rescue his latest "Alice".
- As of the Batman: Arkham Knight DLC side mission "Wonderland", Tetch has taken to speaking in cryptic rhymes. He turns himself into the GCPD and demands to speak with Batman, challenging him to find and rescue three police officers he has taken hostage. Once Batman finds two of them, Tetch hypnotizes him into seeing a storybook-esque world in an attempt to make Batman kill the third officer and become his latest "Alice". However, Batman once again resists Tetch's mind control, escapes the hallucination, and incarcerates him.

=== Miscellaneous ===
- The DC Animated Universe (DCAU) incarnation of Jervis Tetch / Mad Hatter appears in a series of tie-in comic books:
  - In Batman & Robin Adventures #17, he tries to force Alice Pleasance to marry him with a mind-control chip, but Robin forces the Dream Inducer onto Tetch's head, which inadvertently causes him to suffer a permanent mental break with reality. He is returned to Arkham Asylum while living a happy life with Alice in his mind.
  - In Justice League Unlimited #8, it was revealed that years of using his mind-controlling technology had rotted Tetch's mind and driven him mad.
  - An aged Tetch appears in Batman Beyond (vol. 2). After his mind was "burnt out" years prior during his final battle with Batman, Tetch was incarcerated in the mental institution wing of a Neo-Gotham hospital since Arkham Asylum had closed down.
  - As of the Justice League Beyond story arc "Flashdrive", Tetch had died, with his body being kept in a vault underneath Wayne Manor along with the rest of Batman's deceased rogues.
- The Jervis Tetch incarnation of Mad Hatter appears in Injustice: Gods Among Us.
- The Batman (1966) of Jervis Tetch / Mad Hatter appears in Batman '66 #4, in which he joins forces with his brother Morris Tetch / Clock King.

== See also ==
- List of Batman family enemies
