= R.J. Decker =

2026 American crime drama television series

- Genre: Crime drama
- Created by: Robert Doherty
- Inspired by: Double Whammy by Carl Hiaasen
- Starring: Scott Speedman; Jaina Lee Ortiz; Kevin Rankin; Adelaide Clemens; Bevin Bru
- Theme music composer: Sean Callery
- Composers: Sean Callery; Sara Barone
- Country of origin: United States
- Original language: English
- No. of seasons: 2
- No. of episodes: 16

Production
- Executive producers: Carl Hiaasen; Paul McGuigan; Carl Beverly; Sarah Timberman; Robert Doherty; Jason Tracey; Scott Speedman; Liz Friedman; Christine Moore
- Producers: Barbara D'Alessandro; John Radulovic
- Cinematography: Oliver Bokelberg; Ron Fortunato; Nelson Cragg; Bart Tau
- Editors: Joshua Charson; Gerald Valdez; Susan Vaill; Mark Manos; Anna Terebelo; Sondra Watanabe; Michael Benni Pierce
- Running time: 42–45 minutes
- Production companies: Hill of Beans Productions, Inc.; Timberman/Beverly Productions; 20th Television

Original release
- Network: ABC
- Release: March 3, 2026 – present

R.J. Decker is an American crime drama television series created by Robert Doherty and inspired by the 1987 novel Double Whammy by Carl Hiaasen. The series stars Scott Speedman in the titular role and premiered on ABC on March 3, 2026. In May 2026, the series was renewed for a second season which premiered on September 15, 2026.

== Premise ==
The series follows R.J. Decker, discredited newspaper photographer and ex-con, convicted after false testimony, as he "starts over as a private investigator in the colorful-if-crime-filled world of South Florida, tackling cases that range from slightly odd to outright bizarre with the help of his journalist ex, her police detective wife, and a shadowy new benefactor, a woman from his past who could be his greatest ally... or his one-way ticket back to prison."

== Cast ==
=== Main ===
- Scott Speedman as R.J. Decker, a former photojournalist who was jailed for eighteen months for assault and now makes a living as a private investigator
- Jaina Lee Ortiz as Emilia "Emi" Ochoa, a woman who sent R.J. to prison on the order of her corrupt father who was a state senator
- Kevin Rankin as Aloysius "Wish" Aiken, R.J.'s former cellmate and a current bar owner
- Adelaide Clemens as Catherine Delacroix, R.J.'s bisexual ex-wife and a journalist
- Bevin Bru as Melody "Mel" Abreu, Catherine's current wife and a detective at Fort Lauderdale Police Department

=== Recurring ===
- Mélodie Rose Romano as Sofia, Mel's daughter and Catherine's stepdaughter
- Shantel VanSanten as Trudy Harris (season 2), a CSI who gets involved with R.J.

=== Guest ===
- David Zayas as Victor Ochoa (season 1), Emi's father and a corrupt Florida state senator
- Stephen Bishop as Bruce Vinkour
- Beau Bridges as Reggie Decker (season 2), R.J.'s estranged father
- Jason Sanchez as Gabriel Romero (season 2), R.J’s client whose murder conviction is investigated

== Episodes ==
=== Series overview ===
Season	Episodes	Originally released	
Season	Episodes	First released	Last released
1	9	March 3, 2026	April 28, 2026
2	7	September 15, 2026	October 27, 2026

=== Season 1 (2026) ===
No. overall	No. in season	Title	Directed by	Written by	Original release date	Prod. code	U.S. viewers (millions)
1	1	"Pilot"	Paul McGuigan	Robert Doherty	March 3, 2026	1XHK01	3.69
2	2	"Twenty Pounds of Clem in a Ten-Pound Bag"	Paul McGuigan	Robert Doherty	March 10, 2026	1XHK02	3.25
3	3	"The Needle and the Damage Done"	Tara Nicole Weyr	Liz Friedman	March 17, 2026	1XHK04	3.10
4	4	"In Vanity Veritas"	Holly Dale	Ken Biller	March 24, 2026	1XHK05	3.11
5	5	"Burn Notice"	Christine Moore	Jason Tracey	March 31, 2026	1XHK03	2.99
6	6	"Brenner's Back"	Michael Lehmann	Jamie Savarese	April 7, 2026	1XHK06	3.00
7	7	"You've Got Bale"	Seith Mann	Juan Carlos Fernandez	April 14, 2026	1XHK07	3.10
8	8	"Burn the Boats"	Ken Biller	Jason Tracey	April 21, 2026	1XHK08	3.27
9	9	"Even Walls Fall Down"	Christine Moore	Robert Doherty	April 28, 2026	1XHK09	N/A

=== Season 2 (2026) ===
No. overall	No. in season	Title	Directed by	Written by	Original release date	Prod. code	U.S. viewers (millions)
10	1	"The Point of Us Breaking"	Paul McGuigan	Robert Doherty	September 15, 2026	2XHK01	N/A
11	2	"Manos: Hands of Fate"	Christine Moore	Jason Tracey	September 22, 2026	2XHK02	N/A
12	3	"Arms and Armadillos"	Michael Lehmann	Bob Goodman	September 29, 2026	2XHK03	N/A
13	4	"The Angler"	Ken Biller	Liz Friedman	October 6, 2026	2XHK04	N/A
14	5	"Better Luck Tomorrow"	Gwyneth Horder-Payton	Jamie Savarese	October 13, 2026	2XHK05	N/A
15	6	"Blame It on the Rain"	Nelson Cragg	Jacquie Walters	October 20, 2026	2XHK06	N/A
16	7	"Before You Accuse Me"	Michael Lehmann	Juan Carlos Fernandez	October 27, 2026	2XHK07	TBD

== Production ==
=== Development ===
The pilot was ordered by ABC in May 2025. In September 2025, R.J. Decker was ordered to series. The series was created by Robert Doherty who was expected to executive produce alongside Carl Hiaasen, Carl Beverly, Sarah Timberman, and Paul McGuigan. McGuigan directed the pilot.

On May 8, 2026, ABC renewed the series for a second season.

=== Casting ===
In June 2025, Scott Speedman was cast to star. In July 2025, Weruche Opia, Kevin Rankin, Adelaide Clemens, and Bevin Bru joined the main cast. In November 2025, Jaina Lee Ortiz joined the cast in recasting, replacing Opia. In April 2026, David Zayas and Stephen Bishop were cast in recurring roles. In September 2026, Beau Bridges joined the cast in a recurring capacity for the second season.

=== Filming ===
The pilot was filmed in the summer of 2025, in Wilmington, North Carolina and Fort Lauderdale, Florida. Filming for the remainder of the first season commenced in November 2025, in Wilmington, and continued through April 2026. Filming also took place in Fort Fisher and Carolina Beach, North Carolina.

== Release ==
R.J. Decker premiered on ABC on March 3, 2026. Episodes were subsequently made available on Hulu the day following their broadcast. The second season premiered on September 15, 2026.

== Reception ==
=== Critical response ===
The series holds an 80% approval rating on review aggregator Rotten Tomatoes, based on 10 critic reviews, with an average of rated reviews of 6.5/10. Metacritic, which uses a weighted average, assigned a score of 67 out of 100 based on 7 critics, indicating "generally favorable".

=== Ratings ===
The premiere of R.J. Decker drew 3.69 million Live+Same Day viewers and aired behind Will Trent at 8:00 p.m. and High Potential at 9:00 p.m. The broadcast represented ABC's most-watched 10:00 p.m. drama debut in more than five years, since the premiere of Big Sky on November 17, 2020. The premiere's Live+Same Day audience was higher than those of High Potential and Will Trent, which also debuted in the 10:00 p.m. time slot. As a lead-out to High Potential, the series recorded a lead-in retention rate of 73%, exceeding that of The Rookie in the same slot. Within six days of its release, the premiere accumulated 11.64 million multi-platform viewers across ABC, Hulu, Hulu on Disney+, digital platforms, and linear encores. Over this period, it also ranked No. 1 on daily streaming charts on Hulu and Disney+.
