= Head Count (2018 film) =

- Directed by: Elle Callahan
- Written by: Elle Callahan; Michael Nader
- Release date: 2018
- Running time: 90 minutes
- Country: United States
- Language: English

Head Count is a 2018 American independent horror film written and directed by Elle Callahan in her directorial debut.

== Plot ==
Evan, a college student, travels to Joshua Tree, California to visit his older brother Peyton, and the two go on a bonding trip in the nearby desert. They encounter a group of nine vacationers, photographer Zoe and her friends Camille, Tori, Vanessa, Haley, Nico, Max, Sam and Bryan. Evan and Zoe spend the day bonding.

That evening, Peyton tells Evan to go with the group to their rental house, which he does. The group spends the night drinking and telling each other scary stories. When Evan is called upon to tell a scary story, he looks up a website that tells the story of a monster known as a Hisji, whose name must not be said five times; the rest of the group is unimpressed. He and Zoe hear a strange noise and see an unidentified figure while spending time together in a hot tub. The two later sleep together.

The next day, Evan notices an unidentified blonde girl in the house. He sees a nearby ruined house and finds a five-pointed star within a circle carved into one of its interior walls, before being startled by Zoe. The group decides to travel to a nearby hill overlooking the park. Camille comes across what appears to be Bryan in the kitchen, but he is later seen outside with the rest of the group. The blonde girl is also nowhere to be found.

The group travels to the hill and spend some time there talking; Zoe jumps off a nearby cliff while in an apparent trance. Zoe has no recollection of jumping off the cliff and has broken her ankle. They decide to head back to the rental; Zoe describes feeling as if she had no control over her own body. The group is later startled by Peyton, who has returned to pick up Evan. Evan declines his offer to go with Peyton, who leaves. While playing a game of Never have I ever, another Sam appears from the next room in response to being called upon, and the lights go out. The group becomes increasingly paranoid due to the strange events occurring and decide to search the house for anyone else, but find nothing.

Evan recalls the story of the Hisji he previously read out. He looks it up on the Internet and learns that it hides in plain sight, attacks groups of five and has been linked to a missing person case in 2007; he spots the drawing he found earlier in one of the police photos. He later finds Zoe sitting outside; she kisses him and says she is going with Max to the nearby mines. Evan leaves the house with Camille, Max, Vanessa and Nico, but learns that Zoe was in bed and unable to travel due to her ankle. He realizes that only five people are at the house and rushes back with Camille.

The five of them return to find Tori, Sam, Haley and Bryan missing, the house in a mess and Zoe outside, who is talking in an unnerving manner. Zoe, who is actually the Hisji in disguise, compels Vanessa to cut her own arms. The group enters the house in a panic as the Hisji assumes its true monstrous form. It unsuccessfully attempts to enter the house by mimicking the forms of its victims, before compelling Camille, Max, Vanessa and Nico to commit suicide. A frightened Evan sends Peyton a voicemail. The Hisji appears in front of him in Zoe's form.

The next day, Peyton returns to the house and finds the house in the same state it was prior to the group's arrival. Just as he is about to listen to Evan's voicemail an apparently unharmed Evan appears and apologizes to Peyton for his previous behavior. As they leave the desert, Peyton promises to introduce Evan to his friends.

== Cast ==
- Isaac Jay as Evan
- Ashleigh Morghan as Zoe
- Bevin Bru as Camille
- Billy Meade as Max
- Hunter Peterson as Nico
- Chelcie May as Vanessa
- Tory Freeth as Tori
- Michael Herman as Sam
- Amaka Obiechie as Haley
- Sam Marra as Bryan
- Cooper Rowe as Peyton
- Riley Scott as Cass

== Release ==
The film was screened at the 2018 LA Film Festival and the Saskatoon Fantastic Film Festival. Its North American distribution rights were acquired by Samuel Goldwyn Films, which released the film on June 14, 2019.

== Reception ==
On the review aggregator website Rotten Tomatoes, 74% of 19 critics' reviews are positive, with an average rating of 6.1/10. The website's consensus reads: "Head Count doesn't rack up enough punchy scares to be an unqualified success as a horror outing, but an engaging cast and textured characters make it a refreshing genre exercise with something on its mind." Metacritic, which uses a weighted average, assigned the film a score of 48 out of 100, based on 5 critics, indicating "mixed or average" reviews.

The Hollywood Reporter's Justin Lowe gave the film a positive review, writing, "Favoring psychological chills over blood-soaked mayhem, Callahan's impressively crafted debut nods to recent horror classics while displaying an eminently distinctive vision of its own." Dennis Harvey of Variety wrote, "Though not at all comedic like the Happy Death Day films, Head Count similarly plays with narrative perception in clever ways. It's an admirably disciplined film with committed performances by actors playing characters more complicated than the usual horror casualty list." The Los Angeles Times's Noel Murray wrote, "Once the Hisje begins working its way through these kids — needing to take five souls before it can be satisfied — Head Count becomes a solidly made, often quite scary horror picture. But getting to that point requires spending almost 45 minutes at a party with some not-that-engaging strangers."
