= The Bedford Diaries =

- Genre: Drama
- Created by: Tom Fontana; Julie Martin
- Starring: Penn Badgley; Victoria Cartagena; Tiffany Dupont; Corri English; Matthew Modine; Milo Ventimiglia; Ernest Waddell
- Opening theme: "Weight in Gold" by Jeremy Kay
- Country of origin: United States
- Original language: English
- No. of seasons: 1
- No. of episodes: 8

Production
- Executive producers: Tom Fontana; Julie Martin; Barry Levinson
- Running time: 42 minutes
- Production companies: HBO Independent Productions; The Levinson/Fontana Company; Warner Bros. Television; Mother Trucker Television Productions Ltd.

Original release
- Network: The WB
- Release: March 29 – May 10, 2006

The Bedford Diaries is an American drama television series that premiered on March 29, 2006, on The WB and concluded its first season on May 10, 2006. The series was created by Tom Fontana and Julie Martin. This series was canceled on May 18, 2006, after one season due to The WB's merger with UPN, forming The CW on September 18, 2006.

A week prior to its premiere, The WB attempted to build buzz with scenes from the series' pilot posted on their website with more adult material not meant for broadcast, with those scenes edited out for the actual broadcast episode.

== Plot ==
The Bedford Diaries explores the excitement and intensity of New York City college life through the eyes of six students with different backgrounds, experiences and ages, who are brought together in a provocative sexuality seminar. The seminar, which examines the human condition through sexuality, is taught by maverick Professor Jake Macklin, who will challenge and inspire his students as they question their assumptions about their own sexuality, life and identity. The themes include sexual responsibility, manipulation, and the differences between love and sex, passion and abstinence.

The students’ innermost thoughts and desires are told through video diaries they make to fulfill their weekly class assignments.

Among the students are Sarah Gregory, the Student Government President, poised and assured but vulnerable in love, and her younger brother, Owen Gregory, a freshman pre-med major, who plans to take advantage of all the fun college life has to offer. Natalie Dykstra, a lovely, outgoing and emotional woman, has returned to campus after a suicide attempt. She now struggles with being stereotyped as “the jumper.” Natalie's ex-boyfriend, Richard Thorne, a former Park Avenue bad boy who turned his life around after Natalie's jump, is also a member of the class. He's now clean, sober and works as the college newspaper's editor, but he's still tormented by old demons. Lee Hemingway is a scholarship student from Queens with ambitions to become an art historian. Lee has a serious girlfriend, Rachel, but he's attracted to another scholarship student, Zoe Lopez. Zoe talks a fast and flirty game, but despite her brash veneer, she is still a virgin and struggles with her growing feelings for Lee.

The series also stars Tony Award-winner Audra McDonald as Professor Carla Bonatelle, a Political Science professor and head of the Ethics Committee, who regularly clashes with Professor Macklin, as well as with Harold Harper (Peter Gerety), the fatherly, compassionate and often beleaguered dean of students.

== Production ==
The series was produced by HBO Independent Productions, Warner Bros. Television Production Inc. and The Levinson/Fontana Co., with executive producers Tom Fontana, Julie Martin, and Barry Levinson.

Outdoor scenes were filmed at Barnard College in New York City.

== Cast ==
- Matthew Modine as Professor Jake Macklin
- Penn Badgley as Owen Gregory
- Victoria Cartagena as Zoe Lopez
- Tiffany Dupont as Sarah Gregory
- Corri English as Natalie Dykstra
- Audra McDonald as Professor Carla Bonatelle
- Darien Sills-Evans as Aaron Evans
- Milo Ventimiglia as Richard Thorne
- Ernest Waddell as Lee Hemmingway
- Aaron Yoo as James Fong
- Scott Porter as Jason Miller
- Jason Jurman as Peter Wortman
- Emma Bell as Rachel Fein

== Episodes ==
No.	Title	Directed by	Written by	Original release date	Prod. code	US viewers (millions)
1	"I'm Gonna Love College"	Adam Bernstein	Tom Fontana & Julie Martin	March 29, 2006	2T7250	2.000
At Bedford University, Professor Macklin presides over a “sex and the human condition” seminar. It is soon revealed however that Sarah had an affair with a professor, which is about to be made public by Richard, the school newspaper's editor, who happens to be a recovering alcoholic. Meanwhile, Sarah is upset over the fact that her younger brother, Owen, is also a part of the sex seminar, which means he will hear the sordid details of her sex life.
2	"The Truth About Sex"	Adam Bernstein	Story by : Julie Martin & Tom Fontana; Teleplay by : Julie Martin	April 5, 2006	2T7251	1.690
The ethics committee meets about Professor Dixon's sleeping with two of his students and whether he should be censured. His wife asks Sarah if she is sleeping with him and she denies it. After inviting Natalie to a dorm party, Owen is shocked when she shows up with another man on her arm. Rachel shocks Lee with her news.
3	"Tell Me No Secrets"	Ed Bianchi	Story by : Julie Martin & Tom Fontana; Teleplay by : Bradford Winters	April 12, 2006	2T7252	1.790
Professor Macklin decides to make the theme of the class confidentiality after Lee's personal life ends up in the school paper. However, Richard claims free speech as his reasoning for publishing the information. Meanwhile, Sarah starts dating a hot athlete but she is unaware that he is just using her to help fund his team.
4	"Zen and the Art of Manipulation"	David Anspaugh	Story by : Tom Fontana & Julie Martin; Teleplay by : Chris Dingess	April 19, 2006	2T7253	1.580
Richard has no idea that the older woman in his new relationship is none other than Professor Macklin's ex wife, Katrina. Owen and Natalie volunteer at a psychiatric center and Natalie begins to think differently of him. Meanwhile, all the students are learning about sexual manipulation, both in and out of the seminar.
5	"Love and the Tenth Planet"	Whitney Ransick	Story by : Julie Martin & Tom Fontana; Teleplay by : Jessica Brickman	April 26, 2006	2T7254	1.600
Owen tries to impress Natalie on a date. Lee begins playing online poker and faces the consequences. Sarah decides to dump her new guy after she realizes that sex is not enough. Meanwhile, Richard, Professor Macklin and his wife Katrina all end up at the same concert.
6	"The Passion of the Beaver"	Adam Bernstein	Story by : Julie Martin & Tom Fontana; Teleplay by : Jason Yoshimura	May 3, 2006	2T7255	1.370
After Professor Macklin selects passion as the topic for the week, Zoe complains to him that she has nothing to be passionate about. Richard decides to use his family name to get his lover, Katrina, access to city officials. Natalie and Owen decide to try to help save the school's health clinic, although Owen is only in it to try to get Natalie. However, soon Owen's sister, Sarah, decides to oppose the heath clinic, placing Owen in an awkward situation.
7	"Risky Business"	Ron Lagomarsino	Story by : Julie Martin & Tom Fontana; Teleplay by : Brant Englestein	May 10, 2006	2T7256	1.060
Richard is still depressed over the loss of Katrina after she decides to go back to Professor Macklin. He soon ends up in the arms of ex-girlfriend, Natalie, which makes Owen extremely jealous. Meanwhile, Lee continues his gambling addiction and has to buy a term paper for his most important class. Zoe begins to contemplate losing her virginity just so she can make Lee jealous.
8	"Abstinence Makes the Heart Grow Fonder"	Ted Bogosian	Story by : Julie Martin & Tom Fontana; Teleplay by : Lyle Weldon	May 10, 2006	2T7257	0.940
Professor Macklin decides that abstinence will be the topic of the week. Owen and Natalie begin to rethink their relationship after she will not allow him to stay with her for a few days. This makes Natalie think about giving Richard a second chance. Lee, however, is having problems abstaining from gambling and sex and must take a loan from Richard to pay his gambling debt. Richard decides to hire Zoe to be the school newspaper’s new sex columnist, and Sarah almost gives her former professor/lover another chance, until she discovers that she's not the only student he has eyes for.
