= Bevin Bru =

American film and television actress

- Born: Miami, Florida, U.S.
- Education: American Musical and Dramatic Academy
- Occupations: Film and television actress

Bevin Bru is an American film and television actress. She is best known for playing Melody Abreu in the American crime drama television series R.J. Decker.

== Life and career ==
Bru was born in Miami, Florida. At the age of eighteen, she attended the American Musical and Dramatic Academy in New York, and at the age of nineteen, she began wrestling training, wanting to become a professional wrestler. She began her screen career in 2012, appearing in the film Brooklyn Gangster. In 2016, she moved to Los Angeles, California.

Bru guest-starred in television programs including Will Trent, The Rookie: Feds, 9-1-1: Lone Star, Landman and Rescue: HI-Surf, and played the recurring role of Angelique Martin in the second season of The CW superhero television series Batwoman. She starred as Camille in the 2018 horror film Head Count, starring along with Isaac Jay, and she also appeared in films such as 57 Seconds and This Tempting Madness.

In 2026, Bru starred as Melody Abreu in the ABC crime drama television series R.J. Decker, starring along with Scott Speedman, Jaina Lee Ortiz, Kevin Rankin, and Adelaide Clemens.

== Personal life ==
Bru is bisexual, and an advocate of the LGBTQ community. In March 2026, it was revealed that Bru is dating actor James Riseborough.
