= Batwoman season 3 =

Batwoman
- Season 3
- Starring: Javicia Leslie; Rachel Skarsten; Meagan Tandy; Nicole Kang; Camrus Johnson; Victoria Cartagena; Robin Givens; Nick Creegan
- No. of episodes: 13

Release
- Original network: The CW
- Original release: October 13, 2021 – March 2, 2022

Season chronology
- ← Previous; Season 2

The third and final season of the American superhero television series Batwoman was announced in February 2021 and premiered on The CW on October 13, 2021. It stars Javicia Leslie, Rachel Skarsten, Meagan Tandy, Nicole Kang, Camrus Johnson, Robin Givens, Victoria Cartagena, and Nick Creegan.

== Episodes ==
Season three episodes
No. overall	No. in season	Title	Directed by	Written by	Original release date	Prod. code	U.S. viewers (millions)
39	1	"Mad as a Hatter"	Holly Dale	Caroline Dries	October 13, 2021	T13.23151	0.47
Approximately two weeks have passed since the events of the season 2 finale. Alice fan Liam Crandle buys Mad Hatter's lost hat, learns its secret, and decides to become the second Mad Hatter. Alice apparently receives postcards from Jacob in Arkham Asylum as she is visited by Mary. Ryan Wilder recovers the poison ivy sprig as Luke Fox has issues with the glitches of his suit. Renee Montoya urges Mayor Hartley to let her act before Gotham City becomes "Jim Gordon's version" again. During Mary's graduation, Mad Hatter mind-controls her into removing the university chairman's organs, causing Ryan to reluctantly spring Alice from Arkham. Alice realizes she hallucinated Jacob's postcards and convinces Mad Hatter to undo the mind-control before betraying him. Afterwards, Alice is returned to Arkham by Luke. Ryan comes up with the "Batwing" codename for Luke and turns down Sophie's information about her birth mom. Jeturian Industries CEO Jada Jet is informed about a security breach about her, Mary gets a gift from Kate, and Luke finds an A.I. version of his dad Lucius Fox in his helmet. Having learned Batwoman's identity from Alice, Renee blackmails her into working with Alice to find and neutralize all the Batvillain trophies.
40	2	"Loose Tooth"	Jeffrey Hunt	Chad Fiveash & James Stoteraux	October 20, 2021	T13.23152	0.49
Montoya explains that any violation will land Alice in solitary confinement in Arkham forever. Their first assignment is to deal with a Killer Croc-like situation involving the tooth of Killer Croc. As Jada Jet complains about industrial espionage to Ryan, Wayne's acting CEO, Sophie tells Ryan that Jada is her birth mother. Mary meets the Lucius Fox A.I. as Luke speculates that the health status was behind the glitch. Alice determines Killer Croc's hunting grounds, and Batwoman and Alice head there at night where young Whitney has been abducted. In a sewer they meet Mason, whose son Steven was infected by the tooth and has become the monster. To protect Steven, Mason subdues Batwoman with a cattle prod, also frying Alice's ankle monitor before Steven drags him away. Batwoman finds Mason dead, rescues Whitney, and subdues Steven, while Batwing catches Alice escaping and injects tracking nanobots into her. Montoya opens Poison Ivy's sample and finds it a fake. Ryan visits Jada and announces her parentage to her.
41	3	"Freeze"	Greg Beeman	Nancy Kiu	October 27, 2021	T13.23153	0.42
Jada is impressed with Ryan but wants nothing to do with her. Her charming son Marquis, on the other hand, wants to work with Ryan behind Jada's back. He reveals Jada had Ryan from an extramarital affair and left home to keep her pregnancy a secret. The sudden freezing of a city bus points to the late Victor Fries, whose widow Nora survived being unfrozen but is now infirm, though cured of her original illness. Batwoman raids the GCPD evidence locker for Fries' machine. Before she gets there, Nora's sister Dee steals it before both of them are abducted by mercenaries working for an unknown client. With Batwing's help, Batwoman recovers the machine and rescues Nora and Dee, but the lead mercenary escapes. Alice complains that she is sick, hallucinating the nanobots crawling inside her skin, and fails to escape when Nora is indifferent to being taken hostage. After Mary visits Nora and Dee in a park and offers further medical help, she is suddenly seized by a vine and dragged away.
42	4	"Antifreeze"	Holly Dale	Daniel Thomsen	November 3, 2021	T13.23154	0.52
No one is interested in Mary's strange overnight stay in the park, as Ryan is feted as one of Gotham's young business leaders. As she meets Marquis there, Sophie's sister Jordan disappears, and when Marquis helps them find her, she has been frozen somehow at room temperature. Alice persuades Montoya to let her out again after Mary speculates that her hallucinations may come from drugs given to her at Arkham. Alice determines that the Black Glove has been illegally experimenting with safely freezing people; Jordan was targeted because she was investigating them. Mary is able to save Jordan with her newfound botany by thawing her from the inside. Jada leaks to Vesper that Wayne funds have been diverted into a black budget (in fact the Batcave's). As the stock tanks, Luke and Wayne PR employee Charlie are able to sell the diversion as a classified defense project for A.R.G.U.S. with help from John Diggle, but the board of directors ask for Ryan to resign as acting CEO, since Wayne risks a hostile takeover should she not. A Black Glove operative delivers Jada a reliable freezing and unfreezing technique, which she plans to use on Marquis while claiming that he will be going on a "leave of absence".
43	5	"A Lesson from Professor Pyg"	David Ramsey	Caroline Dries & Ebony Gilbert	November 10, 2021	T13.23155	0.37
Batwoman picks up Alice from Sophie's apartment to look at a man strangled with a bullwhip. Renee thinks it might be Catwoman's – it isn't, but Alice reviews old files with Renee. She identifies the killer as minor villain Flamingo but also learns about Renee's history with Poison Ivy. Ivy's powers and habits can be transmitted by infection, and Alice suspects this has happened to Mary. Mary suggests Alice's hallucinations are manifestations of her guilty conscience. Meanwhile, Ryan has been invited to dinner by Jada and brings Sophie as a guest so she might bug Jada's office. The chef serves wine dosed with a paralytic and reveals himself as Professor Pyg, whose life was ruined when Jada fired him. Ryan, Sophie, and the Jets flee into Jada's panic room after Ryan stabs Pyg. As Ryan leaves to find an epipen for Marquis, Jada denies to Sophie that she knew about the Black Gloves' human experiments. Jada surrenders to Pyg to protect Ryan, allowing her to use an epipen on Marquis, who recovers and stabs Pyg to death. Jada tells Ryan that she plans to freeze Marquis because he has been a sociopath since Joker shocked him with his joy-buzzer. The final scene has Marquis spreading blood across his lips in the Joker's style.
44	6	"How Does Your Garden Grow?"	Robert Duncan	Jerry Shandy & Natalie Abrams	November 17, 2021	T13.23156	0.41
A man is found entombed in a honeycomb with honeybees, alerting the police and Montoya. Sophie asks Renee about the Black Glove who froze the currently-recuperating Jordan. Renee gives her the available files, but advises Sophie to stay away from them. Mary revives the man, who claims she did this to him. Alice reveals Mary was infected by Ivy's plants so she traps herself in the Batcave. Batwoman and Alice later find Black Glove operative Virgil Getty, who froze Jordan and her friends, buried up to his neck in soil, apparently by Mary. Ryan keeps Getty from Renee, but Alice leaks his location to Sophie, who tortures Getty about Black Glove before Batwoman stops her. Getty kills himself to protect Black Glove's secrets, enraging Sophie. Alice uses sunlight to transform Mary, who knocks out Luke and is freed by Alice. The new Poison Mary lures Batwoman and Batwing to the botanical gardens, where she traps and subdues them with plants, making off with the Batwing component with the A.I. for Lucius Fox, and tells off Ryan and Luke for ignoring her. Renee frees them while scolding them for not telling her about Mary's infection. As Sophie and Renee make out following a drink together, Ryan calls in a favor from Jada. Alice steals a car and leaves with Poison Mary.
45	7	"Pick Your Poison"	Holly Dale	Kelly Ota & Emily Alonso	November 24, 2021	T13.23157	0.46
Ryan helps Jada capture Marquis in exchange for a cure for Mary's condition. As Jada prepares to place Marquis in suspended animation, he escapes and steals the cure. Alice and Mary flee Gotham, planning to give Alice a full blood transfusion to rid her of the tracker nanomachines. Marquis forces his way into Wayne Tower and beats Luke unconscious. Ryan confronts Marquis, who compels her to sign over control of Wayne Enterprises to him in exchange for Mary's cure. Mary's burgeoning mind control powers allow her to quickly find sufficient blood donors for Alice, and they bond while completing the transfusion. Ryan manages to track down Mary, but then the latter hypnotizes her to reveal she would keep Mary confined if the latter didn't take the cure. Mary calls up vines to trap Ryan and destroys the cure, saying the Poison Ivy persona is her true-self, before absconding with Alice. With Luke sealing the Batcave to keep Marquis from finding it, Ryan, Luke, and Sophie watch as Marquis makes his public debut as the new CEO of Wayne Enterprises, promising to put a smile on the faces of Gotham's populace. As Alice also watches this event, Mary makes a similar debut in the costume of Poison Ivy as she embraces her new villainess identity.
46	8	"Trust Destiny"	Marshall Virtue	Ebony Gilbert & Daphne Miles	January 12, 2022	T13.23158	0.52
In flashbacks, Renee betrayed her lover Poison Ivy and injected her with Batman's desiccation formula to stop her ecoterrorism. In the present, Poison Mary and Alice must use her mind-control abilities at a Metropolis hotel after Luke hacks Mary's credit cards. In Gotham City, Ryan, Sophie, and Renee crash Marquis' party at Wayne, subdue the guards, and reach the Batcave. There, Ryan becomes Batwoman and isolates a faint heartbeat where Poison Ivy was hidden by Batman deep in the Batcave. Poison Mary infiltrates the party and meets with Marquis where she tells him Batwoman's secret identity. After getting the desiccation formula from Poison Ivy's body, Batwoman goes to the roof to confront Poison Mary but finds Marquis, holding Luke hostage. During the struggle, Marquis is hit with the desiccation formula while Poison Mary escapes. After tracking Alice down, Sophie searches Renee's office. As Marquis is taken to Mary's clinic, Batwoman calls up Jada to work on another attempt to heal Marquis. Sophie tells Batwoman that she found Joker's joy buzzer, concluding that Renee's Batvillain trophy mission was intended to let her find and rescue Poison Ivy. In the Batcave, Ivy and Renee are gone.
47	9	"Meet Your Maker"	Michael Blundell	Caroline Dries & Maya Houston	January 19, 2022	T13.23159	0.44
Ryan, Sophie, and Luke search for Poison Ivy in a national park, where she is hiding with Renee and not back to full power. Jada reunites with her old friend, John Diggle, and they look for Joker's joy buzzer to help treat Marquis. Alice finds herself dragged to a location by Poison Mary, who is being called by Poison Ivy. The Bat Team is attacked by Poison Ivy's plants, causing them to take refuge in a cabin. Upon her arrival, Poison Mary puts Alice to sleep so she won't interfere. Poison Ivy paralyzes Renee when she tries to convince her to let go of her plans but Renee has rendered herself immune to the pheromones. Jada and John find the joy buzzer in Renee's office, as well as a list mentioning the obtained Batman villain trophies. Poison Mary unknowingly kills a hunter who finds her before Renee tranquilizes her. Luke comes up with a plan to counter Poison Ivy's plants, and Sophie kisses Ryan. The next day, Luke visits his father's grave and meets John, who needs help opening a mysterious box. Poison Ivy and Poison Mary finally meet and embrace, returning Poison Ivy to full power.
48	10	"Toxic"	Glen Winter	Caroline Dries & Jerry Shandy	January 26, 2022	T13.23160	0.48
Poison Ivy is able to restore her powers from Poison Mary, but the latter's misgivings grow when Ivy murders a healthcare executive and plans to break Gotham Dam and flood the city. With help from Alice, Ryan and Luke try to get information from Renee about Poison Ivy. Jada gives the joy buzzer to Batwoman but demands Marquis' return by midnight. Mary decides to help Batwoman after Alice reveals her accidental murder of a hunter, and she and the others make a plan to use Mary as a Trojan horse for Ivy, having her be a carrier for a pheromone blocker. Ivy tries to siphon more power from Mary when she returns, but this weakens her and Batwoman is able to defeat her. Luke overcomes his self-doubt and, as Batwing, prevents the dam collapse. Ivy awakens on an airplane, where Renee tells her she has arranged with Sophie to have herself and Ivy relocated to Coryana. As Mary is now back to her old self, Jada turns the public against Batwoman, claiming she released all of the Batman villain trophies and is responsible for the damage to the dam. Some of the leakage at Mary's clinic lands on the dehydrated Marquis, reviving him.
49	11	"Broken Toys"	Camrus Johnson	Chad Fiveash & James Stoteraux & Natalie Abrams	February 2, 2022	T13.23161	0.54
Marquis' first move is to take over Arkham. Ryan visits Jada to learn her leverage against Marquis, but they are taken hostage by Victor Zsasz, the first member of Marquis' "work release program". While Batwing and Sophie break into Wayne Enterprises to recover the Lucius A.I., Mary and Alice locate Joker's toymaker Kiki Roulette to repair the joy buzzer. Kiki claims to have repented and takes them to her former workshop. Zsasz plans to kill Jada, but gives Batwoman an hour to rescue her. Ryan learns Jada wanted to send her to another family but was deceived by her doctor, causing Ryan to be abandoned. Jada realizes that Ryan is Batwoman after she defeats Zsasz. Kiki repairs the buzzer, which will work only one more time, and reveals that she is working with Marquis. Batwing and Sophie fight their way past Marquis' minions while Batwoman saves Mary and Alice but Kiki escapes with the joy buzzer and meets up with Marquis. Jada improves her relationship with Ryan. Alice asks Mary to get the joy buzzer for herself so she can become Beth again. Luke tells "Lucius" that he now understands his prior caution, and they agree he is ready to become Batwing. Ryan and Sophie become a couple.
50	12	"We're All Mad Here"	Eric Dean Seaton	Maya Houston & Daphne Miles	February 23, 2022	T13.23162	0.41
Alice's mental state worsens, causing her to hallucinate Mouse and Ocean. Mary feels betrayed that Alice didn't stop her Poison Mary transformation so Alice tracks down Kiki and demands she make another joy buzzer. However, Marquis shoots Kiki. Mary visits the family of the hunter she accidentally killed, only to learn that Alice took the blame for his death. Marquis abducts Jada and the other known Black Glove Society members Barbara Kean, Burton Crowne, Mario Falcone, and Jeremiah Arkham. He kills Crowne, Falcone, and Arkham before revealing to Alice the day Joker hijacked his school bus was the same day her mom's car was run off the bridge. Out of desperation, Alice makes a deal with Marquis in exchange for the joy buzzer. Before Marquis can kill Jada, Batwoman arrives and fights off Marquis while freeing Jada and Barbara. Alice is subdued by Sophie while Batwing claims the joy buzzer. Back in Arkham Asylum, Alice meets Mary, now her personal physician, and admits that she told Marquis about the Batcave.
51	13	"We Having Fun Yet?"	Holly Dale	Nancy Kiu & Caroline Dries	March 2, 2022	T13.23163	0.42
Marquis broadcasts to Gotham City from Joker's old hideout at Amusement Mile that he will expose Batwoman's identity in 5 hours. The Bat Team works with Jada to track down Marquis and counter his plot. After Mary's visit to a destabilizing Alice at Arkham, Ryan visits her and convinces Alice to let the joy buzzer be used on Marquis. Alice reveals what she learned from the inmates about Marquis' true plan, leading to Luke and Mary realizing that he is going to dispense Joker's acid over the city using the Batblimp. As Batwoman goes to confront Marquis, Luke and Sophie sneak into the Batcave where they use Penguin's hypnotic umbrella to make everyone take shelter indoors. Batwoman fights Marquis on the Batblimp and they fall out but land safely. With help from Alice, Batwoman zaps Marquis with the joy buzzer. Luke redirects the Batblimp to a desolate part of Gotham City with the Lucius Fox A.I., sacrificing it to do so. Marquis' sanity is restored. Alice leaves Gotham City for a sanitarium overseas with Mary's approval. The Bat Team reclaims Wayne Enterprises, resuming their mission. A hazmat suit-wearing Dana DeWitt reports at the sight of the explosion when she and her news crew are attacked by a mangled skeletal figure.

== Cast and characters ==
=== Main ===
- Javicia Leslie as Ryan Wilder / Batwoman
- Rachel Skarsten as Beth Kane / Alice
- Meagan Tandy as Sophie Moore
- Nicole Kang as Mary Hamilton / Poison Mary
- Camrus Johnson as Luke Fox / Batwing
- Victoria Cartagena as Renee Montoya
- Robin Givens as Jada Jet
- Nick Creegan as Marquis Jet

=== Recurring ===
- Rachel Maddow as the voice of Vesper Fairchild
- Allison Riley as Dana DeWitt
- Donny Lucas as the voice of Lucius Fox A.I.

=== Guest ===
- Amitai Marmorstein as Liam Crandle / Mad Hatter II
- Sharon Taylor as Mayor Hartley
- Heidi Ben as Steven / Killer Croc 2.0
- Alistair Abell as Mason
- Nevis Unipan as Whitney Hutchison
- Jennifer Cheon Garcia as Head Mercenary
- June B. Wilde as Dee Smithy
- Jennifer Higgin as Nora Fries
- Bridget Regan as Pamela Isley / Poison Ivy
- Keeya King as Jordan Moore
- Tom Lenk as Charlie Clark
- Josh Blacker as Virgil Getty
- Rob Nagle as Lazlo Valentin / Professor Pyg
- David Ramsey as John Diggle
- Alex Morf as Victor Zsasz
- Judy Reyes as Kiki Roulette
- Sam Littlefield as Jonathan Cartwright / Mouse
- Nathan Owens as Ocean
- Nathan Dashwood as Jack Napier / Joker
- Sara J. Southey as Barbara Kean
- Eric Ruggieri as Burton Crowne
- Glen Ferguson as Jeremiah Arkham
- Marcio Barauna as Mario Falcone

== Production ==
=== Development ===
On February 3, 2021, it was announced that The CW had renewed 12 original series for additional seasons through the 2021–2022 television seasons. One of those series was revealed to be Batwoman, along with other Arrowverse series The Flash and Legends of Tomorrow.

=== Casting ===
Javicia Leslie reprises her role as Ryan Wilder / Batwoman, having replaced Ruby Rose in the second season after Rose's contract was not renewed. Rachel Skarsten, Meagan Tandy, Nicole Kang and Camrus Johnson also return as Beth Kane / Alice, Sophie Moore, Mary Hamilton and Luke Fox / Batwing respectively; however, Dougray Scott did not return as Jacob Kane. In July 2021, Robin Givens, Victoria Cartagena, and Nick Creegan were cast as new series regulars for the third season, as Jada Jet, Renee Montoya, and Marquis Jet, respectively; Cartagena had previously played Montoya on Fox's Gotham. In August 2021, Bridget Regan was cast in the recurring role of Pamela Isley / Poison Ivy.

=== Filming ===
Filming began production on July 19, 2021, and concluded on December 22.

== Broadcast ==
The season premiered on October 13, 2021, on The CW in the United States. The season finale aired on March 2, 2022.

== Reception ==
Viewership and ratings per episode of Batwoman season 3
No.	Title	Air date	Rating (18–49)	Viewers (millions)	DVR (18–49)	DVR viewers (millions)	Total (18–49)	Total viewers (millions)
1	"Mad As a Hatter"	October 13, 2021	0.1	0.47	0.1	0.26	0.1	0.73
2	"Loose Tooth"	October 20, 2021	0.1	0.49	0.1	0.26	0.2	0.75
3	"Freeze"	October 27, 2021	0.1	0.42	TBD	TBD	TBD	TBD
4	"Antifreeze"	November 3, 2021	0.1	0.52	TBD	TBD	TBD	TBD
5	"A Lesson from Professor Pyg"	November 10, 2021	0.1	0.37	TBD	TBD	TBD	TBD
6	"How Does Your Garden Grow?"	November 17, 2021	0.1	0.41	0.1	0.36	0.2	0.77
7	"Pick Your Poison"	November 24, 2021	0.1	0.46	0.1	0.31	0.2	0.78
8	"Trust Destiny"	January 12, 2022	0.1	0.52	TBD	TBD	TBD	TBD
9	"Meet Your Maker"	January 19, 2022	0.1	0.44	TBD	TBD	TBD	TBD
10	"Toxic"	January 26, 2022	0.1	0.48	TBD	TBD	TBD	TBD
11	"Broken Toys"	February 2, 2022	0.1	0.54	TBD	TBD	TBD	TBD
12	"We're All Mad Here"	February 23, 2022	0.1	0.41	TBD	TBD	TBD	TBD
13	"Are We Having Fun Yet?"	March 2, 2022	0.1	0.42	TBD	TBD	TBD	TBD
