= Victoria Cartagena =

American actress

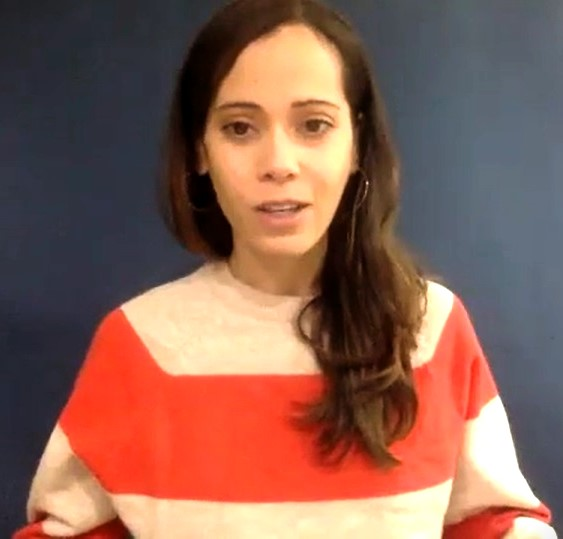
- Cartagena interviewed about her 2023 film Come Find Me
- Born: Philadelphia, Pennsylvania, U.S.
- Education: Penn State University
- Occupations: Stage, film, and television actress
- Years active: 2004–present
- Known for: Zoe Lopez (The Bedford Diaries); Renee Montoya (Gotham and Batwoman)

Victoria Cartagena is an American theater, film, and television actress. Cartagena is known for her role as Zoe Lopez in The Bedford Diaries, and for portraying Renee Montoya as series regular in the first season of Gotham and the third season of Batwoman. She is additionally known for her recurring role as Lourdes in the NBC-turned-Netflix drama Manifest.

== Early life ==
Cartagena was born in Philadelphia, Pennsylvania, the daughter of Victor and Lucy Cartagena. She attended Penn State University. Cartagena has starred in numerous theater productions and participated in various plays and workshops for New York's Lark Theater.

== Career ==
I keep saying the word 'fascinating', because I can't really find another word. I think Renee is absolutely just the most fascinating character I've ever had the privilege to play. She has so much to admire and yet she's really flawed. She's quite reserved in many ways, which is a big challenge, acting-wise. It's always great, as an actor, to try to tackle a challenge, because it keeps you on your toes. The characterization of her, in the comics, it informs pretty much all of the characters in Gotham, so I'm able to draw from there; it's an additional source to help me with my choices. It's like I'm doing homework, which I love. And just the opportunity to be on a show like Gotham is like catnip for any actor. Just the caliber of the production, and the writing and the talent on the show, so I would say that it was the whole package that attracted me to the role.

— Cartagena, on Gotham. (2015)

Cartagena appeared on the WB television series The Bedford Diaries, NBC's Kidnapped, and the 2008 season finale of Law & Order: Special Victims Unit. She has appeared on several different TV shows throughout her career.

Cartagena appeared as Renee Montoya in the FOX TV series Gotham. In the first episode she was credited as recurring. Cartagena would have a contract role starting in the second episode. She said in an interview with Lucia I. Suarez, “I've seen them all,” the actress told Fox News Latino, adding that she loved that there was a character Vicki Vale in the comics. “Everyone knows Batman.” In an interview with Graeme McMillan, "I feel lucky to be playing someone who's so important," the actress said. “She's pretty amazing,” she told The Hollywood Reporter. “I'm playing such an iconic character, and I feel lucky to be playing someone who's so important to the [LGBTQ] community.”

She states to The Wall Street Journal in an interview, "I never read a comic before the show! But now, because I'm on the show, I really want to know everything about her. So I find myself reading comic books more and really enjoying them." Cartagena states about her gay character on Gotham, "I guess both. It's definitely a straight-up fact of who she is as a person — she's a woman, she's a cop, she's Latina, she's gay. But that said, her perspective on things adds a voice to the conversation by virtue of her background that wouldn't necessarily be there, or expected to be there." She also says, "I believe that Renee really did break it off because of her sobriety. And I believe that she really, really loves Barbara. But I think that Renee is at a point in her life where she is more self-aware than she ever was — and I don't know if that's because she's gone through recovery — and she's just willing to step away from the person that she loves in order to save herself. Because she's been there with Barbara before, and it ended badly. So at least, at this point, she has the benefit of hindsight."

In August 2015, it was reported that Cartagena would not be returning as a member of the main cast for season two.

Cartagena made two guest appearances in Jessica Jones and had a recurring role in Manifest.

Cartagena later reprised Renee Montoya in season three of Batwoman. This depiction of Montoya is a former Gotham City Police Department member who left due to the corruption in some of its members.

== Filmography ==
=== Film ===
Year	Title	Role	Notes
2004	Baby Fat	Feisty Latina	
2006	Sorry Ain't Enough	Lillian	
2010	Salt	Portico Checkpoint Agent	
2016	The Pastor	Mercia Alvarez	
2016	Blowtorch	Rita	
2019	21 Bridges	Yolanda Bell	
2021	Come Find Me	Christina	

=== Television ===
Year	Title	Role	Notes
2006	The Bedford Diaries	Zoe Lopez	Main role
2006	Kidnapped	Diane Weaver	"Special Delivery"
2007	Protect and Serve	Anita Esparza	TV film
2008	Law & Order: Special Victims Unit	Cecelia Cruz	"Cold"
2009	Army Wives	Carmen Richards	"Fire in the Hole"
2009	The Good Wife	Teresa Reyes	"Crash"
2011	Unforgettable	Maria Ortiz	"Check Out Time"
2011	A Gifted Man	Maria	"In Case of Memory Loss"
2013	Blue Bloods	Letitia Williams	"Warriors"
2013	Elementary	Hope	"Déjà Vu All Over Again"
2014–2015	Gotham	Renee Montoya	Main role (season 1); 22 episodes
2016	The Path	Evelyn Hernandez	3 episodes
2018	Jessica Jones	Sonia Arocho	2 episodes
2018	Deception	Anne Rojas	"Loading Up"
2018	You	Claudia	Recurring role
2018	Manifest	Lourdes	Recurring role
2019–2020	Almost Family	Amanda	Main role
2019–2023	Servant	Stephanie Reyes	2 episodes
2021–2022	Batwoman	Renee Montoya	Main role (Season 3); 7 episodes
2024	Chicago P.D.	Detective Emily Martel	2 episodes
2024–2026	Law & Order	Defense Attorney Yolanda Matos	3 episodes
